= 2025–26 West Coast Conference men's basketball season =

- League: NCAA Division I
- Sport: Men's basketball
- Teams: 12
- TV partner(s): CBSSN, ESPN, ESPN+

Regular season
- Season champions: Gonzaga and Saint Mary's
- Season MVP: Graham Ike, Gonzaga

Tournament
- Venue: Orleans Arena, Paradise, Nevada
- Champions: Gonzaga
- Runners-up: Santa Clara
- Finals MVP: Graham Ike, Gonzaga

Basketball seasons
- ← 2024–25 2026–27 →

2025–26 West Coast Conference men's basketball standings
	Conf.				Overall
Team	W		L	PCT	W		L	PCT
No. 18 Gonzaga †	16	–	2	.889	31	–	4	.886
Saint Mary's	16	–	2	.889	27	–	6	.818
Santa Clara	15	–	3	.833	26	–	9	.743
Oregon State	9	–	9	.500	17	–	16	.515
San Francisco	8	–	10	.444	17	–	16	.515
Pacific	8	–	10	.444	18	–	15	.545
Seattle	8	–	10	.444	21	–	14	.600
Washington State	7	–	11	.389	12	–	20	.375
Portland	6	–	12	.333	15	–	19	.441
Loyola Marymount	6	–	12	.333	15	–	17	.469
San Diego	5	–	13	.278	12	–	21	.364
Pepperdine	4	–	14	.222	9	–	23	.281
† 2026 WCC tournament winner Rankings from AP poll

The 2025–26 West Coast Conference men's basketball season began with practices in September 2025 and will end with the 2026 West Coast Conference men's basketball tournament in March 2026. This is the 75th season for WCC men's basketball, and the 37th under its current name of "West Coast Conference". The conference was founded in 1952 as the California Basketball Association, became the West Coast Athletic Conference in 1956, and dropped the word "Athletic" in 1989. Saint Mary's was the defending regular season champion while Gonzaga was the defending tournament champion.

This season marked the return of Seattle, who rejoined after departing following the 1979–80 season, along with the final season for Gonzaga, Oregon State and Washington State, who leave for the resumption of the Pac-12 in the 2026–27 season.

== Head coaches ==
No coaching changes were made in the offseason.

=== Coaches ===
Team	Head coach	Previous job	Years at school	Overall record	WCC record	WCC Tournament record	NCAA Tournaments	Sweet Sixteens
Gonzaga	Mark Few	Gonzaga (asst.)	27	750–153 (.831)	358–40 (.899)	54–6 (.900)	25	13
Loyola Marymount	Stan Johnson	Marquette (asst.)	6	72–73 (.497)	32–45 (.416)	3–5 (.375)	0	0
Oregon State	Wayne Tinkle	Grand Canyon (asst.)	12	160–190 (.457)	10–8 (.556)	0–1 (.000)	2	1
Pacific	Dave Smart	Texas Tech (asst.)	2	9–24 (.273)	4–14 (.222)	0–1 (.000)	0	0
Pepperdine	Ed Schilling	Grand Canyon (asst.)	2	13–22 (.371)	4–14 (.222)	3–1 (.750)	0	0
Portland	Shantay Legans	Eastern Washington	5	57–75 (.432)	24–40 (.370)	3–4 (.429)	1	0
Saint Mary's	Randy Bennett	Saint Louis (asst.)	24	562–222 (.717)	288–97 (.738)	30–20 (.600)	11	1
San Diego	Steve Lavin	St. John's	4	35–62 (.361)	13–37 (.260)	2–3 (.400)	8	4
San Francisco	Chris Gerlufsen	San Francisco (asst.)	4	68–35 (.660)	32–19 (.627)	4–3 (.571)	0	0
Santa Clara	Herb Sendek	Arizona State	9	160–120 (.571)	77–62 (.554)	6–9 (.400)	8	1
Seattle	Chris Victor	Seattle (asst.)	5	80–53 (.602)	0–0 (–)	0–0 (–)	0	0
Washington State	David Riley	Eastern Washington	2	19–15 (.559)	8–10 (.444)	1–1 (.500)	0	0

Notes:

- Year at school includes 2025–26 season.
- Overall and WCC records are from time at current school and are through the beginning of the 2025–26 season.

== Preseason ==
=== Preseason poll ===
2025-26 WCC Preseason Men's Basketball Coaches Poll
Rank	Team (First Place Votes)	Points
1.	Gonzaga (9)	119
2.	Saint Mary's (2)	109
3.	San Francisco (1)	98
4.	Santa Clara	92
5.	Oregon State	76
6.	Washington State	69
7.	Loyola Marymount	61
8.	Seattle	53
9.	San Diego	36
10.	Pacific	32
11.	Pepperdine	24
12.	Portland	23

=== All-WCC Preseason Men's Basketball team ===
Honor	Recipient
Preseason All-WCC Team	Ryan Beasley, San Francisco
Preseason All-WCC Team	Thierry Darlan, Santa Clara
Preseason All-WCC Team	Braden Huff, Gonzaga
Preseason All-WCC Team	Graham Ike, Gonzaga
Preseason All-WCC Team	Mikey Lewis, Saint Mary's
Preseason All-WCC Team	Elijah Mahi, Santa Clara
Preseason All-WCC Team	Paulius Murauskas, Saint Mary's
Preseason All-WCC Team	Elias Ralph, Pacific
Preseason All-WCC Team	Tyrone Riley IV, San Francisco
Preseason All-WCC Team	Harry Wessels, Saint Mary's

== Regular season ==
=== Rankings ===
Legend
	Improvement in ranking
	Drop in ranking
	Not ranked previous week
RV	Received votes but were not ranked in Top 25 of poll
(Italics)	Number of first place votes

		Pre/ Wk 1	Wk 2	Wk 3	Wk 4	Wk 5	Wk 6	Wk 7	Wk 8	Wk 9	Wk 10	Wk 11	Wk 12	Wk 13	Wk 14	Wk 15	Wk 16	Wk 17	Wk 18	Wk 19	Wk 20	Final
Gonzaga	AP	21	19	13	12	11	8	7	7	7*	8	9	8	6	6	12	11	9	12	12	12	18
Gonzaga	C	20	19	12	10	11	7	7	7	7	8	9	8	6	5	11	8	9	12	12	10	18
Loyola Marymount	AP									*												
Loyola Marymount	C																					
Oregon State	AP									*												
Oregon State	C																					
Pacific	AP									*												
Pacific	C																					
Pepperdine	AP									*												
Pepperdine	C																					
Portland	AP									*												
Portland	C																					
Saint Mary's	AP	RV		RV	RV	RV	RV	RV		*	RV	RV	RV	RV		RV	RV	RV	21	21	22	RV
Saint Mary's	C	RV	RV	RV	RV	RV	RV	RV	RV	RV	RV	RV	RV	RV	RV		RV	RV	21	21	22	RV
San Diego	AP									*												
San Diego	C																					
San Francisco	AP									*												
San Francisco	C																					
Santa Clara	AP				RV					*					RV	RV			RV		RV	
Santa Clara	C															RV					RV	
Seattle	AP									*												
Seattle	C																					
Washington State	AP									*												
Washington State	C																					

*AP did not release a week 9 poll.

=== Early season tournaments ===
The following table summarizes the multiple-team events (MTE) or early season tournaments in which teams from the West Coast Conference will participate.

Team	Tournament	Dates	Result
Gonzaga	Players Era Festival	November 24–26	2nd
Loyola Marymount	Sunshine Slam	November 24–25	3rd
Oregon State	Paradise Jam	November 21–24	8th
Pacific	Sunshine Slam	November 24–25	1st
Pepperdine	Acrisure Series	November 26	―
Portland	Portland Invitational	November 21–23	2nd
Saint Mary's	Battle 4 Atlantis	November 26–28	2nd
San Diego	Acrisure Series	November 25	―
San Francisco	Acrisure Holiday Classic	November 27–28	4th
Santa Clara	Acrisure Invitational	November 27–28	3rd
Seattle	Resorts World Classic	November 27–28	2nd
Washington State	Maui Invitational	November 24–26	4th

=== WCC Player/Freshman of the Week ===
Throughout the year, the West Coast Conference names a player of the week and a freshman of the week as follows:

Week	Date	Player of the Week	School	Freshman of the Week	School
1	November 10, 2025	Josiah Lake II	Oregon State	Joel Foxwell	Portland
2	November 17, 2025	Graham Ike	Gonzaga	Liam Campbell	Saint Mary's
3	November 24, 2025	Myron Amey Jr.	LMU	Joel Foxwell (2)	Portland
4	December 1, 2025	Paulius Murauskas	Saint Mary's	Ace Glass	Washington State
5	December 8, 2025	Braden Huff	Gonzaga	Allen Graves	Santa Clara
6	December 15, 2025	Graham Ike (2)	Gonzaga	Joel Foxwell (3)	Portland
7	December 22, 2025	Braden Huff (2)	Gonzaga	Ace Glass (2)	Washington State
8	December 29, 2025	Elijah Mahi	Santa Clara	Dillan Shaw	Saint Mary's
9	January 5, 2026	Paulius Murauskas (2)	Saint Mary's	Joel Foxwell (4)	Portland
10	January 12, 2026	Graham Ike (3)	Gonzaga	Joel Foxwell (5)	Portland
10	January 12, 2026	Graham Ike (3)	Gonzaga	Sash Gavalyugov	Santa Clara
11	January 19, 2026	Christian Hammond	Santa Clara	Allen Graves (2)	Santa Clara
12	January 26, 2026	Paulius Murauskas (3)	Saint Mary's	Ace Glass (3)	Washington State
13	February 2, 2026	Graham Ike (3)	Gonzaga	Allen Graves (3)	Santa Clara
14	February 9, 2026	Joel Foxwell	Portland	Allen Graves (4)	Santa Clara
14	February 9, 2026	Joel Foxwell	Portland	Joel Foxwell (6)	Portland
15	February 16, 2026	Graham Ike (4)	Gonzaga	Allen Graves (5)	Santa Clara
16	February 23, 2026	Elijah Mahi (2)	Santa Clara	Joel Foxwell (7)	Portland
17	March 2, 2026	Mikey Lewis	Saint Mary's	Allen Graves (6)	Santa Clara

== Honors and awards ==
=== All-WCC Major Awards ===
On March 3, 2026, the West Coast Conference announced the following awards:

2026 All-West Coast Conference Men’s Basketball Major Awards
Award	Recipient(s)
Player of the Year	Graham Ike, Gonzaga
Coach of the Year	Herb Sendek, Santa Clara
Defensive Player of the Year	Will Heimbrodt, Seattle
Newcomer of the Year	David Fuchs, San Francisco
Sixth Man of the Year	Allen Graves, Santa Clara
Freshman of the Year	Allen Graves, Santa Clara

=== All-WCC teams ===
2026 Big East Men's Basketball All-Conference Teams
First Team	Second Team	Freshman Team	Honorable Mention
Joshua Dent, Saint Mary's; Joel Foxwell, Portland; Allen Graves, Santa Clara; Christian Hammond, Santa Clara; Graham Ike, Gonzaga; Josiah Lake II, Oregon State; Mikey Lewis, Saint Mary's; Elijah Mahi, Santa Clara; Paulius Murauskas, Saint Mary's; Elias Ralph, Pacific	Ryan Beasley, San Francisco; David Fuchs, San Francisco; Ace Glass, Washington State; Brayden Maldonado, Seattle; Tyrone Riley IV, San Francisco	Davis Fogle, Gonzaga; Joel Foxwell, Portland; Ace Glass, Washington State; Allen Graves, Santa Clara; Mario Saint-Supéry, Gonzaga; Dillan Shaw, Saint Mary's	Myron Amey Jr., Loyola Marymount; Rodney Brown Jr., Loyola Marymount; Aaron Clark, Pepperdine; ND Okafor, Washington State; Jalen Shelly, Loyola Marymount; Isaiah Sy, Oregon State; TJ Wainwright, Pacific; Junseok Yeo, Seattle

== Postseason ==
=== WCC Tournament ===
First round Thursday, March 5
9	Portland	77
12	Pepperdine	68
10	Loyola Marymount	62
11	San Diego	66

Second round Friday, March 6
8	Washington State	68
9	Portland	74
7	Seattle	58
11	San Diego	56

Third round Saturday, March 7
5	San Francisco	82
9	Portland	65
6	Pacific	61
7	Seattle	58

Quarterfinals; Sunday, March 8
4	Oregon State	78
5	San Francisco	77
3	Santa Clara	76
6	Pacific	68

Semifinals; Monday, March 9
1	12 Gonzaga	65
4	Oregon State	56
2	21 Saint Mary's	71
3	Santa Clara	76

Championship; Tuesday, March 10
1	12 Gonzaga	79
3	Santa Clara	68

=== NCAA tournament ===
Seed	Region	School	First round	Second round	Sweet 16	Elite Eight	Final Four	Championship
3	West	Gonzaga	W 73–64 vs. (14) Kennesaw State	L 68–74 vs. (11) Texas	DNP			
7	South	Saint Mary's	L 50–63 vs. (10) Texas A&M	DNP				
10	Midwest	Santa Clara	L 84–89 ^{(OT)} vs. (7) Kentucky	DNP				
		W–L (%):	1–2 (.333)	0–1 (.000)	0–0 (–)	0–0 (–)	0–0 (–)	0–0 (–)
Total: 1–3 (.250)

=== NIT ===
Seed	Region	School	First round	Second round	Quarterfinals	Semifinals	Final
4	Auburn	Seattle	W 67–52 vs. St. Thomas	L 85–91 vs. (1) Auburn	DNP		
		W–L (%):	1–0 (1.000)	0–1 (.000)	0–0 (–)	0–0 (–)	0–0 (–)
Total: 1–1 (.500)

== NBA draft ==
PG	Point guard	SG	Shooting guard	SF	Small forward	PF	Power forward	C	Center

Player	Team	Round	Pick #	Position	School
(United States) Allen Graves	Toronto Raptors	1	19	PF	Santa Clara
