= 2025–26 Gonzaga Bulldogs men's basketball team =

American college basketball team season

2025–26 Gonzaga Bulldogs men's basketball

WCC regular season co-champions WCC tournament champions

NCAA tournament, Second round
- Conference: West Coast Conference

Ranking
- Coaches: No. 18
- AP: No. 18
- Record: 31–4 (16–2 WCC)
- Head coach: Mark Few (27th season)
- Assistant coaches: Brian Michaelson (13th season); Stephen Gentry (5th season); R-Jay Barsh (3rd season); Zach Norvell Jr. (3rd season)
- Home arena: McCarthey Athletic Center

2025–26 West Coast Conference men's basketball standings
	Conf.				Overall
Team	W		L	PCT	W		L	PCT
No. 18 Gonzaga †	16	–	2	.889	31	–	4	.886
Saint Mary's	16	–	2	.889	27	–	6	.818
Santa Clara	15	–	3	.833	26	–	9	.743
Oregon State	9	–	9	.500	17	–	16	.515
San Francisco	8	–	10	.444	17	–	16	.515
Pacific	8	–	10	.444	18	–	15	.545
Seattle	8	–	10	.444	21	–	14	.600
Washington State	7	–	11	.389	12	–	20	.375
Portland	6	–	12	.333	15	–	19	.441
Loyola Marymount	6	–	12	.333	15	–	17	.469
San Diego	5	–	13	.278	12	–	21	.364
Pepperdine	4	–	14	.222	9	–	23	.281
† 2026 WCC tournament winner Rankings from AP poll

The 2025–26 Gonzaga Bulldogs men's basketball team represented Gonzaga University in the 2025–26 NCAA Division I men's basketball season. The team, also unofficially nicknamed the "Zags", is led by head coach Mark Few in his 27th season as head coach, and played their home games at the McCarthey Athletic Center, located in Spokane, Washington, as members of the West Coast Conference (WCC).

This season marked the team's last season as members of the West Coast Conference as they will join the Pac-12 Conference on July 1, 2026.

== Previous season ==
The Bulldogs finished the 2024–25 season 26–9, 14–4 in WCC play to finish in second place. As the No. 2 seed in the WCC Tournament, they defeated San Francisco and Saint Mary's to win the WCC Tournament. They received an automaic bid to the NCAA Tournament where as the No. 8 seed in the Midwest region, they defeated Georgia in the first round before losing to Houston in the second round. This was the first time since 2014 that the Bulldogs failed to reach the sweet sixteen (not counting the COVID-disrupted 2019–20 season in which the NCAA tournament was not held).

== Offseason ==
=== Departures ===
Gonzaga Bulldogs Departures
Name	Number	Pos.	Height	Weight	Year	Hometown	Reason for departure
Khalif Battle	99	G	6'5"	185	Graduate	Hillside, NJ	Graduated
Ben Gregg	33	F	6'10"	230	Senior	Clackamas, OR	Graduated/undrafted in 2025 NBA draft; signed with SIG Strasbourg
Nolan Hickman	11	G	6'2"	190	Senior	Seattle, WA	Graduated/undrafted in 2025 NBA draft; signed with the Capital City Go-Go
Joe Few	15	G	6'0"	170	Senior	Spokane, WA	Walk-on; graduated
Ryan Nembhard	0	G	6'0"	180	Senior	Aurora, ON	Graduated/undrafted in 2025 NBA draft; signed with the Dallas Mavericks
Michael Ajayi	1	G	6'7"	228	Senior	Kent, WA	Transferred to Butler
Jun Seok Yeo	22	F	6'8"	218	Junior	Seoul, South Korea	Transferred to Seattle
Dusty Stromer	4	G	6'6"	200	Sophomore	Sherman Oaks, CA	Transferred to Grand Canyon
Graydon Lemke	14	F	6'10"	190	Freshman	Las Vegas, NV	Walk-on; transferred to Belmont

=== Incoming transfers ===
Gonzaga incoming transfers
Name	Number	Pos.	Height	Weight	Year	Hometown	Previous School
Tyon Grant-Foster	7	G	6'7"	220	Graduate	Kansas City, KS	Grand Canyon
Adam Miller	44	G	6'3"	190	Graduate	Peoria, IL	Arizona State
Jalen Warley	8	G	6'7"	205	Senior	Philadelphia, PA	Virginia

=== Recruiting classes ===
==== 2025 recruiting class ====
College recruiting
Name	Hometown	School	Height	Weight	Commit date
Davis Fogle #9 SF	Anacortes, WA	AZ Compass Prep	6 ft 7 in (2.01 m)	185 lb (84 kg)	Jul 4, 2024
Davis Fogle #9 SF	Recruit ratings: Rivals: 247Sports: ESPN: (87)				
Parker Jefferson #44 C	Waxahachie, TX	Inglewood	6 ft 9 in (2.06 m)	230 lb (100 kg)	May 2, 2025
Parker Jefferson #44 C	Recruit ratings: Rivals: 247Sports: ESPN: (82)				
Mario Saint-Supéry; PG	Málaga, Spain	Baloncesto Málaga	6 ft 3 in (1.91 m)	199 lb (90 kg)	Jun 30, 2025
Mario Saint-Supéry; PG	Recruit ratings: No ratings found				
Overall recruit ranking:
Note: In many cases, Scout, Rivals, 247Sports, On3, and ESPN may conflict in their listings of height and weight.; In these cases, the average was taken. ESPN grades are on a 100-point scale.; Sources: "Gonzaga 2025 Basketball Commitments". Rivals.; "2025 Gonzaga Bulldogs Recruiting Class". ESPN.; "2025 Team Ranking". Rivals.

==== 2026 recruiting class ====
College recruiting (2026)
Name	Hometown	School	Height	Weight	Commit date
Jack Kayil; PG	Berlin, Germany	Alba Berlin	6 ft 5 in (1.96 m)	195 lb (88 kg)	Oct 1, 2025
Jack Kayil; PG	Recruit ratings: Rivals: 247Sports: ESPN: (NR)				
Sam Funches #10 C	Madison, MS	Germantown	7 ft 0 in (2.13 m)	205 lb (93 kg)	Oct 17, 2025
Sam Funches #10 C	Recruit ratings: Rivals: 247Sports: ESPN: (81)				
Luca Foster #18 SF	Downingtown, PA	Link Academy	6 ft 5 in (1.96 m)	185 lb (84 kg)	Oct 25, 2025
Luca Foster #18 SF	Recruit ratings: Rivals: 247Sports: ESPN: (87)				
Overall recruit ranking:
Note: In many cases, Scout, Rivals, 247Sports, On3, and ESPN may conflict in their listings of height and weight.; In these cases, the average was taken. ESPN grades are on a 100-point scale.; Sources: "Gonzaga 2026 Basketball Commitments". Rivals.; "2026 Gonzaga Bulldogs Recruiting Class". ESPN.; "2026 Team Ranking". Rivals.

==== 2027 recruiting class ====
College recruiting (2027)
Name	Hometown	School	Height	Weight	Commit date
Dooney Johnson #7 PG	Milwaukee, WI	Milwaukee Juneau	6 ft 6 in (1.98 m)	170 lb (77 kg)	Oct 29, 2025
Dooney Johnson #7 PG	Recruit ratings: Rivals: 247Sports: ESPN: (89)				
Overall recruit ranking:
Note: In many cases, Scout, Rivals, 247Sports, On3, and ESPN may conflict in their listings of height and weight.; In these cases, the average was taken. ESPN grades are on a 100-point scale.; Sources: "Gonzaga 2026 Basketball Commitments". Rivals.; "2026 Gonzaga Bulldogs Recruiting Class". ESPN.; "2027 Team Ranking". Rivals.

== Roster ==
Note: Players' year is based on remaining eligibility. The NCAA did not count the 2020–21 season towards eligibility.

2025–26 Gonzaga Bulldogs men's basketball team
Players
Coaches

Pos.	#	Name	Height	Weight	Year	Previous school	Hometown
G	7	Tyon Grant-Foster	6 ft 7 in (2.01 m)	215 lb (98 kg)	GS	Grand Canyon	Kansas City, KS
G	2	Steele Venters	6 ft 7 in (2.01 m)	200 lb (91 kg)	GS	Eastern Washington	Ellensburg, WA
F	15	Graham Ike	6 ft 9 in (2.06 m)	250 lb (113 kg)	GS	Wyoming	Aurora, CO
G	23	Adam Miller	6 ft 3 in (1.91 m)	200 lb (91 kg)	GS	Arizona State	Peoria, IL
F	35	Noah Haaland (W)	6 ft 9 in (2.06 m)	245 lb (111 kg)	RS Sr	Allan Hancock	Rathdrum, ID
G	8	Jalen Warley	6 ft 7 in (2.01 m)	205 lb (93 kg)	Sr	Virginia	Philadelphia, PA
F	34	Braden Huff (injured)	6 ft 10 in (2.08 m)	250 lb (113 kg)	RS Jr	Glenbard West	Glen Ellyn, IL
G	3	Braeden Smith	6 ft 0 in (1.83 m)	170 lb (77 kg)	RS Jr	Colgate	Seattle, WA
F	5	Emmanuel Innocenti	6 ft 5 in (1.96 m)	198 lb (90 kg)	Jr	Tarleton State	Petit Badien, Ivory Coast
G	10	Joaquim ArauzMoore (W)	6 ft 1 in (1.85 m)	175 lb (79 kg)	RS So	Branson	Ross, CA
C	24	Ismaila Diagne	7 ft 0 in (2.13 m)	237 lb (108 kg)	So	Real Madrid	Nguékhokh, Senegal
G	0	Cade Orness (W)	6 ft 5 in (1.96 m)	185 lb (84 kg)	RS Fr	North Kitsap	Poulsbo, WA
G	4	Davis Fogle	6 ft 7 in (2.01 m)	200 lb (91 kg)	Fr	AZ Compass Prep	Anacortes, WA
F	32	Parker Jefferson (redshirt)	6 ft 9 in (2.06 m)	240 lb (109 kg)	Fr	Inglewood	Waxahachie, TX
G	14	Alonzo Metz (W) (redshirt)	5 ft 11 in (1.8 m)	165 lb (75 kg)	Fr	Riviera Prep	Portland, OR
G	17	Mario Saint-Supéry	6 ft 3 in (1.91 m)	199 lb (90 kg)	Fr	Baloncesto Málaga	Málaga, Spain

Head coach

- Mark Few (Oregon)

Assistant coach(es)

- Brian Michaelson (Gonzaga)
- Stephen Gentry (Gonzaga)
- R-Jay Barsh (Puget Sound)
- Zach Norvell Jr. (Gonzaga)

Legend

- (C) Team captain
- (S) Suspended
- (I) Ineligible
- (W) Walk-on
- Injured
- Current redshirt

Roster
Last update: October 27, 2025

- Roster is subject to change as/if players transfer or leave the program for other reasons.

== Schedule and results ==
Date time, TV	Rank^{#}	Opponent^{#}	Result	Record	High points	High rebounds	High assists	Site (attendance) city, state
Exhibition
October 19, 2025*; 2:00 p.m., KHQ	No. 21	Northwest	W 111–62		18 – Fogle	13 – Warley	4 – Tied	McCarthey Athletic Center (6,000); Spokane, WA
October 27, 2025*; 6:00 p.m., KHQ	No. 21	Western Oregon	W 111–53		21 – Huff	10 – Diagne	4 – Tied	McCarthey Athletic Center (6,000); Spokane, WA
Non-conference regular season
November 3, 2025*; 6:00 p.m., KHQ/ESPN+	No. 21	Texas Southern	W 98–43	1–0	15 – Grant-Foster	11 – Ike	4 – Tied	McCarthey Athletic Center (6,000); Spokane, WA
November 8, 2025*; 7:30 p.m., ESPN2	No. 21	vs. Oklahoma; Bad Boy Mower Series Spokane	W 83–68	2–0	19 – Ike	11 – Ike	6 – Saint-Supéry	Numerica Veterans Arena (11,081); Spokane, WA
November 11, 2025*; 7:00 p.m., ESPN	No. 19	No. 23 Creighton	W 90–63	3–0	20 – Ike	10 – Ike	5 – Smith	McCarthey Athletic Center (6,000); Spokane, WA
November 14, 2025*; 8:00 p.m., ESPN2	No. 19	at Arizona State	W 77–65	4–0	20 – Ike	12 – Grant-Foster	9 – Smith	Desert Financial Arena (10,016); Tempe, AZ
November 17, 2025*; 6:00 p.m., KHQ/ESPN+	No. 13	Southern Utah	W 122–50	5–0	22 – Huff	6 – Huff	7 – Saint-Supéry	McCarthey Athletic Center (6,000); Spokane, WA
November 24, 2025*; 6:30 p.m., TNT	No. 12	vs. No. 8 Alabama; Players Era Festival Game 1	W 95–85	6–0	21 – Ike	11 – Ike	6 – Saint-Supéry	MGM Grand Garden Arena; Paradise, NV
November 25, 2025*; 6:30 p.m., TruTV	No. 12	vs. Maryland; Players Era Festival Game 2	W 100–61	7–0	20 – Huff	6 – Ike	9 – Saint-Supéry	MGM Grand Garden Arena (2,799); Paradise, NV
November 26, 2025*; 6:30 p.m., TNT	No. 12	vs. No. 7 Michigan; Players Era Festival Championship	L 61–101	7–1	14 – Tied	8 – Grant-Foster	7 – Smith	MGM Grand Garden Arena (3,947); Paradise, NV
December 5, 2025*; 4:00 p.m., ESPN2	No. 11	vs. No. 18 Kentucky	W 94–59	8–1	28 – Ike	10 – Ike	6 – Tied	Bridgestone Arena (18,507); Nashville, TN
December 7, 2025*; 6:00 p.m., KAYU/ESPN+	No. 11	North Florida	W 109–58	9–1	24 – Huff	8 – Diagne	7 – Saint-Supéry	McCarthey Athletic Center (6,000); Spokane, WA
December 13, 2025*; 8:30 p.m., ESPN	No. 8	vs. No. 25 UCLA; Seattle Hoops Showdown	W 82–72	10–1	25 – Ike	7 – Warley	5 – Ike	Climate Pledge Arena (13,148); Seattle, WA
December 17, 2025*; 6:00 p.m., KHQ/ESPN+	No. 7	Campbell	W 98–70	11–1	37 – Huff	11 – Ike	5 – Tied	McCarthey Athletic Center (6,000); Spokane, WA
December 21, 2025*; 6:00 p.m., Peacock/NBCSN	No. 7	vs. Oregon; Northwest Elite Showdown	W 91–82	12–1	21 – Smith	11 – Ike	7 – Smith	Moda Center (10,055); Portland, OR
WCC regular season
December 28, 2025; 5:00 p.m., ESPN+	No. 7	at Pepperdine	W 96–56	13–1 (1–0)	18 – Grant-Foster	10 – Ike	8 – Smith	Firestone Fieldhouse (1,912); Malibu, CA
December 30, 2025; 6:30 p.m., KHQ/ESPN+	No. 7	at San Diego	W 99–93	14–1 (2–0)	22 – Warley	14 – Warley	6 – Smith	Jenny Craig Pavilion (3,521); San Diego, CA
January 2, 2026; 6:00 p.m., KHQ/ESPN+	No. 7	Seattle	W 80–72 ^{OT}	15–1 (3–0)	28 – Huff	10 – Ike	6 – Smith	McCarthey Athletic Center (6,000); Spokane, WA
January 4, 2026; 6:00 p.m., KHQ/ESPN+	No. 7	Loyola Marymount	W 82–47	16–1 (4–0)	16 – Ike	9 – Huff	5 – Saint-Supéry	McCarthey Athletic Center (6,000); Spokane, WA
January 8, 2026; 8:30 p.m., ESPN2	No. 8	Santa Clara	W 89–77	17–1 (5–0)	34 – Ike	11 – Ike	4 – Tied	McCarthey Athletic Center (6,000); Spokane, WA
January 15, 2026; 7:00 p.m., CBSSN	No. 9	at Washington State; Rivalry	W 86–65	18–1 (6–0)	23 – Ike	11 – Ike	5 – Ike	Beasley Coliseum (6,439); Pullman, WA
January 17, 2026; 7:00 p.m., ESPN+	No. 9	at Seattle	W 71–50	19–1 (7–0)	20 – Saint-Supéry	9 – Grant-Foster	4 – Tied	Climate Pledge Arena (7,830); Seattle, WA
January 21, 2026; 6:00 p.m., KHQ/ESPN+	No. 8	Pepperdine	W 84–60	20–1 (8–0)	17 – Fogle	10 – Diagne	4 – Fogle	McCarthey Athletic Center (6,000); Spokane, WA
January 24, 2026; 5:00 p.m., CBSSN	No. 8	San Francisco	W 68–66	21–1 (9–0)	19 – Warley	9 – Fogle	4 – Smith	McCarthey Athletic Center (6,000); Spokane, WA
January 31, 2026; 7:30 p.m., ESPN	No. 6	Saint Mary's; Rivalry	W 73–65	22–1 (10–0)	30 – Ike	7 – Tied	5 – Saint-Supéry	McCarthey Athletic Center (6,000); Spokane, WA
February 4, 2026; 7:00 p.m., ESPN+	No. 6	at Portland	L 80–87	22–2 (10–1)	24 – Ike	10 – Ike	3 – Tied	Chiles Center (3,345); Portland, OR
February 7, 2026; 3:00 p.m., ESPN+	No. 6	at Oregon State	W 81–61	23–2 (11–1)	35 – Ike	7 – Tied	6 – Smith	Gill Coliseum (7,865); Corvallis, OR
February 10, 2026; 8:00 p.m., ESPN2	No. 12	Washington State; Rivalry	W 83–53	24–2 (12–1)	20 – Ike	7 – Ike	4 – Smith	McCarthey Athletic Center (6,000); Spokane, WA
February 14, 2026; 7:30 p.m., ESPN	No. 12	at Santa Clara	W 94–86	25–2 (13–1)	21 – Tied	15 – Ike	5 – Saint-Supéry	Leavey Center (4,200); Santa Clara, CA
February 18, 2026; 8:00 p.m., ESPN2	No. 11	at San Francisco	W 80–59	26–2 (14–1)	22 – Ike	8 – Innocenti	6 – Saint-Supéry	Chase Center (3,848); San Francisco, CA
February 21, 2026; 6:00 p.m., KHQ/ESPN+	No. 11	Pacific	W 71–62	27–2 (15–1)	20 – Ike	6 – Saint-Supéry	3 – Smith	McCarthey Athletic Center (6,000); Spokane, WA
February 25, 2026; 6:00 p.m., KHQ/ESPN+	No. 9	Portland	W 89–48	28–2 (16–1)	19 – Ike	8 – Ike	6 – Fogle	McCarthey Athletic Center (6,000); Spokane, WA
February 28, 2026; 7:30 p.m., ESPN	No. 9	at Saint Mary's; Rivalry	L 59–70	28–3 (16–2)	17 – Ike	9 – Ike	4 – Ike	University Credit Union Pavilion (3,500); Moraga, CA
WCC Tournament
March 9, 2026; 6:00 p.m., ESPN	(1) No. 12	vs. (4) Oregon State; Semifinal	W 65–56	29–3	24 – Ike	11 – Ike	4 – Miller	Orleans Arena (6,087); Paradise, NV
March 10, 2026; 6:00 p.m., ESPN	(1) No. 12	vs. (3) Santa Clara; Championship	W 79–68	30–3	21 – Saint-Supéry	8 – Fogle	6 – Fogle	Orleans Arena (6,517); Paradise, NV
NCAA tournament
March 19, 2026*; 7:00 p.m., TBS	(3 W) No. 12	vs. (14 W) Kennesaw State; First round	W 73–64	31–3	19 – Ike	12 – Warley	8 – Saint-Supéry	Moda Center (14,070); Portland, OR
March 21, 2026*; 4:10 p.m., truTV/TBS	(3 W) No. 12	vs. (11 W) Texas; Second round	L 68–74	31–4	25 – Ike	8 – Warley	5 – Tied	Moda Center (14,385); Portland, OR
*Non-conference game. ^{#}Rankings from AP Poll. (#) Tournament seedings in parentheses. W=West. All times are in Pacific Time.

== Rankings ==
Ranking movements Legend: ██ Increase in ranking ██ Decrease in ranking
	Week																				
Poll	Pre	1	2	3	4	5	6	7	8	9	10	11	12	13	14	15	16	17	18	19	Final
AP	21	19	13	12	11	8	7	7	7	8	9	8	6	6	12	11	9	12	12	12	18
Coaches	20	19	12	10	11	7	7	7	7	8	9	8	6	5	11	8	9	12	12	10	18

== See also ==
- 2025–26 Gonzaga Bulldogs women's basketball team
