= 2025–26 Pacific Tigers men's basketball team =

American college basketball season

2025–26 Pacific Tigers men's basketball

Sunshine Slam Ocean Bracket champions
- Conference: West Coast Conference
- Record: 18–15 (8–10 WCC)
- Head coach: Dave Smart (2nd season)
- Assistant coaches: Craig Beaucamp; Garrett Bridges; Brandon Cole; Charles Hantoumakos; Zach Angelini
- Home arena: Alex G. Spanos Center

2025–26 West Coast Conference men's basketball standings
	Conf.				Overall
Team	W		L	PCT	W		L	PCT
No. 18 Gonzaga †	16	–	2	.889	31	–	4	.886
Saint Mary's	16	–	2	.889	27	–	6	.818
Santa Clara	15	–	3	.833	26	–	9	.743
Oregon State	9	–	9	.500	17	–	16	.515
San Francisco	8	–	10	.444	17	–	16	.515
Pacific	8	–	10	.444	18	–	15	.545
Seattle	8	–	10	.444	21	–	14	.600
Washington State	7	–	11	.389	12	–	20	.375
Portland	6	–	12	.333	15	–	19	.441
Loyola Marymount	6	–	12	.333	15	–	17	.469
San Diego	5	–	13	.278	12	–	21	.364
Pepperdine	4	–	14	.222	9	–	23	.281
† 2026 WCC tournament winner Rankings from AP poll

The 2025–26 Pacific Tigers men's basketball team represented the University of the Pacific during the 2025–26 NCAA Division I men's basketball season. The Tigers, led by second-year head coach Dave Smart, played their home games at the Alex G. Spanos Center as members of the West Coast Conference.

== Previous season ==
The Tigers finished the 2024–25 season 9–24, 4–14 in WCC play to finish in a tie for ninth place. They lost in the first round to San Diego in the WCC tournament.

== Roster ==
2025–26 Pacific Tigers men's basketball team
Players
Coaches

Pos.	#	Name	Height	Weight	Year	Previous school	Hometown
G	0	Alexis Marmolejos	6 ft 2 in (1.88 m)	180 lb (82 kg)	Sr	Army and Navy Academy; Lamar	Santiago, Dominican Republic
G	1	Justin Rochelin	6 ft 5 in (1.96 m)	200 lb (91 kg)	RS Sr	Heritage Christian School (CA); UC San Diego	Encino, CA
F	2	Elias Ralph	6 ft 7 in (2.01 m)	212 lb (96 kg)	RS Sr	Holy Trinity Academy; Victoria	Okotoks, AB
G	3	Carlsheon Young	6 ft 4 in (1.93 m)	195 lb (88 kg)	Fr	Midwest City HS	Oklahoma City, OK
G	4	Dominic Capriotti	6 ft 4 in (1.93 m)	195 lb (88 kg)	RS Jr	PHH Prep; Binghamton	Tempe, AZ
G	6	Jaden Clayton	6 ft 1 in (1.85 m)	185 lb (84 kg)	Sr	Fort Erie International Academy; Maine	Whitby, ON
F	7	Augustas Brazdeikis	6 ft 8 in (2.03 m)	220 lb (100 kg)	Jr	New Horizon Prep; Carleton	Oakville, ON
G	9	Kajus Kublickas	6 ft 2 in (1.88 m)	180 lb (82 kg)	Jr	Florida	Kaunas, Lithuania
G	10	TJ Wainwright	6 ft 3 in (1.91 m)	195 lb (88 kg)	Sr	Montverde Academy; Long Beach State	Los Angeles, CA
G	11	Emmanuel Manyuon	6 ft 2 in (1.88 m)	180 lb (82 kg)	Jr	Austin HS; Garden City CC	Austin, MN
G	12	Noah Budu	6 ft 1 in (1.85 m)	209 lb (95 kg)	So	American Canyon HS	American Canyon, CA
F	13	Kellen Hampton	6 ft 7 in (2.01 m)	205 lb (93 kg)	Fr	Moreau Catholic HS	Hayward, CA
F	14	Isaac Jack	6 ft 11 in (2.11 m)	250 lb (113 kg)	Sr	Fort Erie International Academy; Dayton	Port Alberni, BC
F	14	Jaion Pitt	6 ft 7 in (2.01 m)	230 lb (104 kg)	Fr	Bella Vista Prep	Norwood, ON
G	17	Eyal Harel	6 ft 7 in (2.01 m)	195 lb (88 kg)	Fr	Hapoel Tel Aviv	Hod Hasharon, Israel
F/C	21	Clayton Mpiana	6 ft 9 in (2.06 m)	220 lb (100 kg)	Fr	Arrowhead Christian Academy	Redlands, CA
F	22	Kris Keinys	6 ft 8 in (2.03 m)	214 lb (97 kg)	Jr	Vytautas The Great Gymnasium; Minnesota	Klaipėda, Lithuania
C	24	KC Ibekwe	6 ft 11 in (2.11 m)	285 lb (129 kg)	Sr	Centennial Secondary School; Washington	Coquitlam, BC

Head coach

- Dave Smart (Queens (ON))

Assistant coach(es)

- Craig Beaucamp (Saskatchewan)
- Garrett Bridges (St. Augustine's)
- Brandon Cole (Ashford)
- Charles Hantoumakos (Brock)
- Zach Angelini (Waterloo)

Legend

- (C) Team captain
- (S) Suspended
- (I) Ineligible
- (W) Walk-on
- Injured
- Current redshirt

Roster
Last update: December 5, 2025

== Schedule and results ==
Date time, TV	Rank^{#}	Opponent^{#}	Result	Record	High points	High rebounds	High assists	Site (attendance) city, state
Non-conference regular season
November 5, 2025*; 7:00 p.m., ESPN+		Life Pacific	W 83–56	1–0	20 – Ralph	7 – Ralph	8 – Clayton	Alex G. Spanos Center (1,447); Stockton, CA
November 8, 2025*; 7:00 p.m., MW Network		at Nevada	L 77–78	1–1	21 – Ralph	8 – Ralph	11 – Clayton	Lawlor Events Center (7,307); Reno, NV
November 12, 2025*; 7:00 p.m., ESPN+		Long Beach State	W 69–66	2–1	15 – Tied	9 – Ralph	6 – Clayton	Alex G. Spanos Center (1,232); Stockton, CA
November 15, 2025*; 2:00 p.m., ESPN+		at Cal State Fullerton	W 85–73	3–1	20 – Wainwright	9 – Ibekwe	3 – Tied	Titan Gym (459); Fullerton, CA
November 20, 2025*; 4:00 pm, ESPN+		at Florida Atlantic; Sunshine Slam campus game	L 59–82	3–2	16 – Ralph	7 – Rochelin	3 – Clayton	Eleanor R. Baldwin Arena (3,161); Boca Raton, FL
November 24, 2025*; 8:30 a.m., BallerTV		vs. Stony Brook; Sunshine Slam Ocean Bracket semifinal	W 86–58	4–2	17 – Ralph	8 – Wainwright	3 – Ralph	Ocean Center; Daytona Beach, FL
November 25, 2025*; 10:00 a.m., BallerTV		vs. Jacksonville; Sunshine Slam Ocean Bracket consolation	W 68–53	5–2	15 – Wainwright	10 – Ralph	5 – Clayton	Ocean Center; Daytona Beach, FL
November 29, 2025*; 7:00 p.m., ESPN+		Sacramento State	W 68–54	6–2	22 – Ralph	12 – Jack	9 – Clayton	Alex G. Spanos Center (2,311); Stockton, CA
December 3, 2025*; 6:00 p.m., MW Network		at Air Force	W 80–65	7–2	31 – Ralph	6 – Tied	7 – Kublickas	Clune Arena (885); Air Force Academy, CO
December 6, 2025*; 2:00 p.m., ACCNX		at California	L 61–67	7–3	15 – Jack	16 – Jack	7 – Clayton	Haas Pavilion (2,688); Berkeley, CA
December 13, 2025*; 4:00 p.m., ESPN+		Simpson	W 104–50	8–3	22 – Wainwright	10 – Tied	13 – Kublickas	Alex G. Spanos Center (1,017); Stockton, CA
December 16, 2025*; 6:00 p.m., ESPN+		at No. 10 BYU	L 57–93	8–4	14 – Kublickas	7 – Ralph	6 – Clayton	Marriott Center (17,936); Provo, UT
December 21, 2025*; 4:00 pm, ESPN+		Nicholls	W 95–82	9–4	25 – Ralph	7 – Wainwright	6 – Kublickas	Alex G. Spanos Center (1,055); Stockton, CA
WCC regular season
December 28, 2025; 3:00 p.m., ESPN+		at San Diego	L 54–66	9–5 (0–1)	15 – Wainwright	11 – Ralph	8 – Clayton	Jenny Craig Pavilion (1,279); San Diego, CA
December 30, 2025; 7:00 p.m., ESPN+		at Loyola Marymount	L 71–80	9–6 (0–2)	19 – Ralph	10 – Ralph	8 – Clayton	Gersten Pavilion (791); Los Angeles, CA
January 2, 2026; 7:00 p.m., ESPN+		Oregon State	W 84–53	10–6 (1–2)	24 – Ralph	8 – Rochelin	7 – Clayton	Alex G. Spanos Center (1,104); Stockton, CA
January 4, 2026; 4:00 p.m., ESPN+		Pepperdine	W 74–69	11–6 (2–2)	22 – Ralph	10 – Ralph	5 – Kublickas	Alex G. Spanos Center (1,032); Stockton, CA
January 8, 2026; 7:00 p.m., ESPN+		at Portland	L 89–90 ^{OT}	11–7 (2–3)	20 – Rochelin	8 – Rochelin	12 – Clayton	Chiles Center (1,091); Portland, OR
January 10, 2026; 4:00 p.m., ESPN+		San Diego	W 77–70	12–7 (3–3)	25 – Wainwright	13 – Rochelin	7 – Clayton	Alex G. Spanos Center (1,058); Stockton, CA
January 14, 2026; 7:00 p.m., ESPN+		at Santa Clara	L 71–80	12–8 (3–4)	17 – Ralph	6 – Jack	7 – Clayton	Leavey Center (1,558); Santa Clara, CA
January 17, 2026; 3:00 p.m., ESPN+		at Oregon State	W 81–64	13–8 (4–4)	20 – Ralph	11 – Ralph	8 – Clayton	Gill Coliseum (2,624); Corvallis, OR
January 24, 2026; 4:00 p.m., ESPN+		Seattle	W 56–54	14–8 (5–4)	15 – Wainwright	9 – Ralph	7 – Clayton	Alex G. Spanos Center (1,589); Stockton, CA
January 28, 2026; 7:00 p.m., ESPN+		at Portland	W 74–51	15–8 (6–4)	17 – Rochelin	11 – Rochelin	8 – Kublickas	Alex G. Spanos Center (1,613); Stockton, CA
January 31, 2026; 7:00 p.m., ESPN+		at San Francisco	L 82–87	15–9 (6–5)	23 – Ralph	7 – Jack	7 – Kublickas	Sobrato Center (2,102); San Francisco, CA
February 4, 2026; 7:00 p.m., ESPN+		Santa Clara	L 56–71	15–10 (6–6)	13 – Wainwright	11 – Rochelin	5 – Clayton	Alex G. Spanos Center (2,102); Stockton, CA
February 7, 2026; 5:00 p.m., ESPN+		at Pepperdine	W 92–59	16–10 (7–6)	27 – Wainwright	13 – Ralph	8 – Clayton	Firestone Fieldhouse (584); Malibiu, CA
February 11, 2026; 7:00 p.m., ESPN+		Loyola Marymount	W 65–59	17–10 (8–6)	22 – Ralph	7 – Tied	8 – Clayton	Alex G. Spanos Center (1,169); Stockton, CA
February 14, 2026; 7:30 p.m., ESPN2		Saint Mary's	L 61–72	17–11 (8–7)	17 – Ralph	12 – Ralph	7 – Clayton	Alex G. Spanos Center (2,090); Stockton, CA
February 18, 2026; 7:00 p.m., ESPN+		at Washington State	L 70–87	17–12 (8–8)	16 – Ralph	6 – Pitt	4 – Tied	Beasley Coliseum (2,494); Pullman, WA
February 21, 2026; 6:00 p.m., ESPN+		at No. 11 Gonzaga	L 62–71	17–13 (8–9)	12 – Tied	14 – Rochelin	8 – Clayton	McCarthey Athletic Center (6,000); Spokane, WA
February 28, 2026; 3:00 p.m., CBSSN		San Francisco	L 61–72	17–14 (8–10)	19 – Ralph	10 – Ralph	10 – Clayton	Alex G. Spanos Center (2,597); Stockton, CA
WCC tournament
March 7, 2026; 8:30 p.m., ESPN+	(6)	vs. (7) Seattle; Third Round	W 61–58	18–14	15 – Ralph	10 – Rochelin	6 – Clayton	Orleans Arena (2,757); Paradise, NV
March 8, 2026; 8:00 p.m., ESPN+	(6)	vs. (3) Santa Clara; Quarterfinal	L 68–76	18–15	25 – Ralph	8 – Rochelin	9 – Clayton	Orleans Arena (3,664); Paradise, NV
*Non-conference game. ^{#}Rankings from AP Poll. (#) Tournament seedings in parentheses. All times are in Pacific Time.
