= Davis Fogle =

American basketball player (born 2006)

No. 4 – Gonzaga Bulldogs
- Position: Shooting guard
- Conference: Pac-12 Conference

Personal information
- Born: June 6, 2006 (age 20)
- Listed height: 6 ft 7 in (2.01 m)
- Listed weight: 200 lb (91 kg)

Career information
- High school: Anacortes (Anacortes, Washington); AZ Compass Prep (Chandler, Arizona)
- College: Gonzaga (2025–present)

Davis Fogle (born June 6, 2006) is an American college basketball player for the Gonzaga Bulldogs of the Pac-12 Conference.

== Early life ==
Fogle grew up in Kodiak, Alaska, and moved to Anacortes, Washington in the 4th grade. He initially attended Anacortes High School. As a sophomore, Fogle earned conference MVP and first-team all-state honors. He averaged 31.4 points per game as a junior. Fogle transferred to AZ Compass Prep in Chandler, Arizona, for his senior year, averaging 15.7 points and six rebounds per game. Coming out of high school, Fogle was rated as a four-star recruit by 247Sports, receiving offers from schools such as Kansas, Gonzaga, Nebraska, Creighton, LSU, Washington, Clemson, Louisville, Boise State, Seattle, and Saint Mary’s. He committed to play college basketball for the Gonzaga Bulldogs.

== College career ==
On November 17, 2025, Fogle recorded 19 points in a win over Southern Utah in the 2026 West Coast Conference final. He notched 13 points, eight rebounds, six assists, and two steals in a victory against Santa Clara. In the first round of the 2026 NCAA Division I men's basketball tournament, Fogle put up 17 points in a win over Kennesaw State. He finished his freshman season averaging 8.6 points and 3.1 rebounds per game.
