= 2026 West Coast Conference men's basketball tournament =

American college basketball postseason tournament

- Classification: Division I
- Season: 2025–26
- Teams: 12
- Site: Orleans Arena; Paradise, Nevada
- Champions: Gonzaga (23rd title)
- Winning coach: Mark Few (21st title)
- MVP: Graham Ike (Gonzaga)
- Television: ESPN+, ESPN2, ESPN

2025–26 West Coast Conference men's basketball standings
	Conf.				Overall
Team	W		L	PCT	W		L	PCT
No. 18 Gonzaga †	16	–	2	.889	31	–	4	.886
Saint Mary's	16	–	2	.889	27	–	6	.818
Santa Clara	15	–	3	.833	26	–	9	.743
Oregon State	9	–	9	.500	17	–	16	.515
San Francisco	8	–	10	.444	17	–	16	.515
Pacific	8	–	10	.444	18	–	15	.545
Seattle	8	–	10	.444	21	–	14	.600
Washington State	7	–	11	.389	12	–	20	.375
Portland	6	–	12	.333	15	–	19	.441
Loyola Marymount	6	–	12	.333	15	–	17	.469
San Diego	5	–	13	.278	12	–	21	.364
Pepperdine	4	–	14	.222	9	–	23	.281
† 2026 WCC tournament winner Rankings from AP poll

The 2026 West Coast Conference men's basketball Tournament was the postseason men's basketball tournament for the West Coast Conference for the 2025–26 season. All tournament games were played at Orleans Arena in the Las Vegas-area community of Paradise, Nevada, from March 5–10, 2026. The winner, Gonzaga, received the conference's automatic bid to the 2026 NCAA tournament.

== Seeds ==
All 12 conference teams are scheduled to participate in the tournament. Teams will be seeded by record within the conference, with a tiebreaker system to seed teams with identical conference records. The tiebreakers are to operate in the following order:

1. Head-to-head record
2. Record against the top-seeded team not involved in the tie, going down through the standings until the tie is broken
3. NET rating after the final regular-season conference games on February 28

Seed	School	Conf. record	Tiebreaker(s)
1	Gonzaga	16–2	2–0 vs. Santa Clara
2	Saint Mary's	16–2	1–1 vs. Santa Clara
3	Santa Clara	15–3	
4	Oregon State	9–9	
5	San Francisco	8–10	3–0 vs. Pacific/Seattle
6	Pacific	8–10	1–2 vs. San Francisco/Seattle
7	Seattle	8–10	0–2 vs. San Francisco/Pacific
8	Washington State	7–11	
9	Portland	6–12	1–0 vs. Loyola Marymount
10	Loyola Marymount	6–12	0–1 vs. Portland
11	San Diego	5–13	
12	Pepperdine	4–14	

== Schedule and results ==
Game	Time	Matchup	Score	Television
First Round - Thursday, March 5
1	6:00 p.m.	No. 9 Portland vs. No. 12 Pepperdine	77–68	ESPN+
2	8:30 p.m.	No. 10 Loyola Marymount vs. No. 11 San Diego	62–66	ESPN+
Second Round - Friday, March 6
3	6:00 p.m.	No. 8 Washington State vs. No. 9 Portland	68–74	ESPN+
4	8:30 p.m.	No. 7 Seattle vs. No. 11 San Diego	58–56	ESPN+
Third Round – Saturday, March 7
5	6:00 p.m.	No. 5 San Francisco vs. No. 9 Portland	82–65	ESPN+
6	8:30 p.m.	No. 6 Pacific vs. No. 7 Seattle	61–58	ESPN+
Quarterfinals - Sunday, March 8
7	5:30 p.m.	No. 4 Oregon State vs. No. 5 San Francisco	78–77	ESPN2
8	8:00 p.m.	No. 3 Santa Clara vs. No. 6 Pacific	76–68	ESPN2
Semifinals - Monday, March 9
9	6:00 p.m.	No. 1 Gonzaga vs. No. 4 Oregon State	65–56	ESPN
10	8:30 p.m.	No. 2 Saint Mary's vs. No. 3 Santa Clara	71–76	ESPN2
Final – Tuesday, March 10
11	6:00 p.m.	No. 1 Gonzaga vs. No. 3 Santa Clara	79–68	ESPN
*Game times in PST. Rankings denote tournament seed.

== Bracket ==
First round Thursday, March 5
9	Portland	77
12	Pepperdine	68
10	Loyola Marymount	62
11	San Diego	66

Second round Friday, March 6
8	Washington State	68
9	Portland	74
7	Seattle	58
11	San Diego	56

Third round Saturday, March 7
5	San Francisco	82
9	Portland	65
6	Pacific	61
7	Seattle	58

Quarterfinals; Sunday, March 8
4	Oregon State	78
5	San Francisco	77
3	Santa Clara	76
6	Pacific	68

Semifinals; Monday, March 9
1	12 Gonzaga	65
4	Oregon State	56
2	21 Saint Mary's	71
3	Santa Clara	76

Championship; Tuesday, March 10
1	12 Gonzaga	79
3	Santa Clara	68

== All Tournament Team ==
The following players were recognized following the tournament:

Most Outstanding Player

- Graham Ike, F, Gonzaga

All-Tournament Team

- Allen Graves, F, Santa Clara
- Mario Saint-Supéry, G, Gonzaga
- Sash Gavalyugov, G, Santa Clara
- Tyon Grant-Foster, G, Gonzaga
- Graham Ike, F, Gonzaga

== See also ==
- 2026 West Coast Conference women's basketball tournament
