= 2025–26 Pepperdine Waves men's basketball team =

American college basketball season

2025–26 Pepperdine Waves men's basketball
- Conference: West Coast Conference
- Record: 9–23 (4–14 WCC)
- Head coach: Ed Schilling (2nd season)
- Assistant coaches: Scott Rigot; Tyus Edney; Josh Calbert; Mike Doig; Jeremy Grubbs
- Home arena: Firestone Fieldhouse

2025–26 West Coast Conference men's basketball standings
	Conf.				Overall
Team	W		L	PCT	W		L	PCT
No. 12 Gonzaga	16	–	2	.889	28	–	3	.903
No. 21 Saint Mary's	16	–	2	.889	27	–	4	.871
Santa Clara	15	–	3	.833	25	–	7	.781
Oregon State	9	–	9	.500	17	–	15	.531
San Francisco	8	–	10	.444	17	–	16	.515
Pacific	8	–	10	.444	18	–	15	.545
Seattle	8	–	10	.444	20	–	13	.606
Washington State	7	–	11	.389	12	–	20	.375
Portland	6	–	12	.333	15	–	19	.441
Loyola Marymount	6	–	12	.333	15	–	17	.469
San Diego	5	–	13	.278	12	–	21	.364
Pepperdine	4	–	14	.222	9	–	23	.281
† 2026 WCC tournament winner As of March 8, 2026; Rankings from AP poll

The 2025–26 Pepperdine Waves men's basketball team represented Pepperdine University during the 2025–26 NCAA Division I men's basketball season. The Waves, led by second–year head coach Ed Schilling, played their home games at the Firestone Fieldhouse in Malibu, California as members of the West Coast Conference. They finished the season 9–23, 4–14 in WCC play to finish in last place. They lost to Portland in the first round of the WCC tournament.

== Previous season ==
The Waves finished 2024–25 with a record of 13–22, 4–14 in WCC play to finish in a tie for ninth place. As the No. 9 seed in the WCC tournament, Pepperdine defeated Portland, Oregon State, and Santa Clara to the advance to a tournament semifinal game. There they lost to No. 19 Saint Mary's.

== Offseason ==
Guard Aaron Clark made his way onto the Pepperdine roster after using up his redshirt year in 2024–25 after transferring from Wake Forest. 6-foot, 9-inch forward Pavle Stošic transferred to Pepperdine after playing for Gonzaga in 2023–24 and utilizing his redshirt year at Utah State. The Waves also picked up forward Styles Phipps via the transfer portal; Phipps had spent his freshman season in 2024–25 with Grand Canyon.

The Waves also brought back head coach Ed Schilling and returned all five assistant coaches from 2024–25.

== Preseason ==
The annual West Coast Conference preseason media poll saw the Waves finishing eleventh out of twelve teams in the conference (Gonzaga was selected to finish first).

== Roster ==
2025–26 Pepperdine Waves men's basketball team
Players
Coaches

Pos.	#	Name	Height	Weight	Year	Previous school	Hometown
G	0	Styles Phipps	6 ft 2 in (1.88 m)	185 lb (84 kg)	So	Saint Mary's; Grand Canyon	Phoenix, AZ
G	1	David Mager	6 ft 4 in (1.93 m)	195 lb (88 kg)	RS Jr	Dwight-Englewood School	Englewood, NJ
G	3	Aaron Clark	6 ft 4 in (1.93 m)	190 lb (86 kg)	RS So	Brewster Academy; Wake Forest	Easton, PA
F	4	Pavle Stošic	6 ft 9 in (2.06 m)	215 lb (98 kg)	RS So	Gonzaga; Utah State	Niš, Serbia
F	7	Vladimir Sudar	6 ft 5 in (1.96 m)	190 lb (86 kg)	Fr	Studentski centar	Podgorica, Montenegro
F	9	Pasha Shemirani	6 ft 5 in (1.96 m)	200 lb (91 kg)	Fr	Sunrise Christian (KS); Fresno State	Los Angeles, CA
G	11	Ty Virgil	6 ft 5 in (1.96 m)	170 lb (77 kg)	Fr	Hillcrest Prep	Sacramento, CA
C	14	Stefan Čičić	7 ft 0 in (2.13 m)	260 lb (118 kg)	RS Fr	Tulane	Riverside, IL
F	18	Yonatan Levy	6 ft 10 in (2.08 m)	250 lb (113 kg)	So	Green Bay	Hod HaSharon, Israel
G/F	23	Javon Cooley	6 ft 5 in (1.96 m)	205 lb (93 kg)	GS	St. Rita; Marist	Chicago, IL
F	24	Preston Phillips	6 ft 8 in (2.03 m)	225 lb (102 kg)	GS	Jimtown (IN); Evansville; Bethel Univ. (IN)	Elkhart, IN
G	25	Anto Balian	6 ft 1 in (1.85 m)	200 lb (91 kg)	Fr	Pilibos	Glendale, CA
F	33	Nikola Radovanović	6 ft 9 in (2.06 m)	215 lb (98 kg)	Fr	Sloboda Užice	Nevesinje, Bosnia and Herzegovina
F/C	35	Danilo Dožic	6 ft 10 in (2.08 m)	225 lb (102 kg)	So	JL Bourg U21	Belgrade, Serbia
G	77	Luka Vudragović	6 ft 6 in (1.98 m)	210 lb (95 kg)	Fr	Metalac Valjevo	Stari Banovci, Serbia

Head coach

- Ed Schilling (Miami (OH))

Assistant coach(es)

- Scott Rigot (Buffalo)
- Tyus Edney (UCLA)
- Josh Calbert
- Mike Doig (Clearwater Christian)
- Jeremy Grubbs (Pittsburgh)

Legend

- (C) Team captain
- (S) Suspended
- (I) Ineligible
- (W) Walk-on
- Injured
- Current redshirt

Roster
Last update: December 3, 2025

== Schedule and results ==
Date time, TV	Rank^{#}	Opponent^{#}	Result	Record	High points	High rebounds	High assists	Site city, state
Non-conference regular season
November 3, 2025*; 6:00 p.m., ESPN+		Life Pacific	W 88–80	1–0	14 – Clark	7 – Phipps, Stošic	5 – Phipps	Firestone Fieldhouse (10); Malibu, CA
November 7, 2025*; 7:30 p.m., BTN		No. 12 UCLA	L 63–74	1–1	18 – Clark	9 – Cooley	6 – Phipps	Pauley Pavilion (9,103); Los Angeles, CA
November 11, 2025*; 6:00 p.m., ESPN+		Lincoln	W 113–76	2–1	23 – Dožic	11 – Levy	9 – Phipps	Firestone Fieldhouse (452); Malibu, CA
November 15, 2025*; 6:00 p.m., ESPN+		Northern Colorado	L 81–88 ^{OT}	2–2	22 – Phipps	10 – Phipps	3 – Tied	Firestone Fieldhouse (608); Malibu, CA
November 18, 2025*; 6:00 p.m., ESPN+		New Orleans; Acrisure Series on-campus game	W 90–79	3–2	23 – Cooley	7 – Cooley	11 – Phipps	Firestone Fieldhouse (489); Malibu, CA
November 21, 2025*; 6:00 p.m., ESPN+		Stephen F. Austin; Acrisure Series on-campus game	L 60–63	3–3	30 – Clark	8 – Cooley	3 – Phipps	Firestone Fieldhouse (481); Malibu, CA
November 26, 2025*; 4:00 p.m., CBSN		vs. Fresno State; Acrisure Series	L 53–76	3–4	15 – Cooley	8 – Phipps	5 – Phipps	Acrisure Arena; Thousand Palms, CA
November 29, 2025*; 2:00 p.m., ESPN+		at Cal State Fullerton	L 69–83	3–5	13 – Tied	7 – Clark	5 – Clark	Titan Gym (536); Fullerton, CA
December 2, 2025*; 6:00 p.m., ESPN+		Abilene Christian	L 63–71	3–6	19 – Phipps	5 – Clark	5 – Clark	Firestone Fieldhouse (511); Malibu, CA
December 6, 2025*; 2:00 p.m., ESPN+		Vermont	L 56–65	3–7	15 – Cooley	11 – Phipps	4 – Phipps	Firestone Fieldhouse (566); Malibu, CA
December 13, 2025*; 6:30 p.m., ESPN+		at Cal State Bakersfield	W 70–62	4–7	25 – Clark	8 – Levy	4 – Phipps	Icardo Center (402); Bakersfield, CA
December 18, 2025*; 7:00 p.m., ESPN+		at Long Beach State	L 78–81	4–8	25 – Phipps	8 – Phipps	7 – Phipps	Walter Pyramid (1,006); Long Beach, California
December 20, 2025*; 6:00 p.m., ESPN+		Rice	W 84–62	5–8	25 – Clark	7 – Levy	6 – Phipps	Firestone Fieldhouse (566); Malibu, CA
WCC regular season
December 28, 2025; 5:00 p.m., ESPN+		No. 7 Gonzaga	L 56–96	5–9 (0–1)	15 – Levy	7 – Phipps	3 – Tied	Firestone Fieldhouse (1,912); Malibu, CA
December 30, 2025; 6:00 p.m., ESPN+		Saint Mary's	L 45–72	5–10 (0–2)	8 – Tied	5 – Tied	5 – Levy	Firestone Fieldhouse (816); Malibu, CA
January 2, 2026; 5:00 p.m., ESPN+		at Santa Clara	L 63–82	5–11 (0–3)	12 – Tied	5 – Tied	5 – Phipps	Leavey Center (1,158); Santa Clara, CA
January 4, 2026; 4:00 p.m., ESPN+		at Pacific	L 69–74	5–12 (0–4)	18 – Cooley	7 – Cooley	4 – Phipps	Alex G. Spanos Center (1,032); Stockton, CA
January 8, 2026; 6:30 p.m., ESPN+		at San Diego	L 63–83	5–13 (0–5)	18 – Phipps	7 – Phipps	6 – Phipps	Jenny Craig Pavilion (809); San Diego, CA
January 10, 2026; 5:00 p.m., ESPN+		San Francisco	L 60–80	5–14 (0–6)	18 – Phipps	9 – Phipps	3 – Tied	Firestone Fieldhouse (645); Malibu, CA
January 14, 2026; 6:00 p.m., ESPN+		Portland	W 67–63	6–14 (1–6)	18 – Clark	8 – Clark	4 – Clark	Firestone Fieldhouse (809); Malibu, CA
January 21, 2026; 6:00 p.m., ESPN+		at No. 8 Gonzaga	L 60–84	6–15 (1–7)	13 – Phipps	5 – Tied	4 – Clark	McCarthey Athletic Center (6,000); Spokane, WA
January 24, 2026; 3:00 p.m., ESPN+		at Washington State	L 79–95	6–16 (1–8)	25 – Phipps	5 – Stošic	5 – Phipps	Beasley Coliseum (2,773); Pullman, WA
January 28, 2026; 6:00 p.m., ESPN+		San Diego	L 88–92 ^{OT}	6–17 (1–9)	31 – Clark	8 – Dožic	9 – Phipps	Firestone Fieldhouse (643); Malibu, CA
February 4, 2026; 7:00 p.m., ESPN+		at Seattle	L 81–83	6–18 (1–10)	22 – Clark	7 – Phipps	4 – Tied	Redhawk Center (999); Seattle, WA
February 7, 2026; 5:00 p.m., ESPN+		Pacific	L 59–92	6–19 (1–11)	17 – Clark	6 – Tied	3 – Phipps	Firestone Fieldhouse (584); Malibu, CA
February 11, 2026; 7:00 p.m., ESPN+		at Saint Mary's	L 61–72	6–20 (1–12)	17 – Ralph	12 – Ralph	7 – Clayton	University Credit Union Pavilion (2,090); Moraga, CA
February 14, 2026; 2:00 p.m., ESPN+		Loyola Marymount	W 90–89	7–20 (2–12)	25 – Amey Jr.	11 – Jocius	5 – Vide	Firestone Fieldhouse (699); Malibu, CA
February 18, 2026; 7:00 p.m., ESPN+		at Portland	W 95–87	8–20 (3–12)	29 – Clark	7 – Cicic	12 – Phipps	Chiles Center (1,493); Portland
February 21, 2026; 3:00 p.m., ESPN+		at Oregon State	L 73–83	8–21 (3–13)	32 – Clark	6 – Tied	3 – Tied	Gill Coliseum (3,146); Corvallis, OR
February 25, 2026; 6:00 p.m., ESPN+		Seattle	L 80–87	8–22 (3–14)	19 – Phipps	8 – Tied	7 – Phipps	Firestone Fieldhouse (571); Malibu, CA
February 28, 2026; 5:00 p.m., ESPN+		Washington State	W 88–79	9–22 (4–14)	23 – Čičić	10 – Čičić	9 – Phipps	Firestone Fieldhouse (792); Malibu, CA
WCC tournament
March 5, 2026; 6:00 p.m., ESPN+	(12)	vs. (9) Portland; First Round	L 68–77	9–23	15 – Cooley	10 – Cooley	7 – Phipps	Orleans Arena (1,242); Paradise, NV
*Non-conference game. ^{#}Rankings from AP Poll. (#) Tournament seedings in parentheses. All times are in Pacific Time.
