= 2025–26 Loyola Marymount Lions men's basketball team =

American college basketball season

2025–26 Loyola Marymount Lions men's basketball
- Conference: West Coast Conference
- Record: 15–17 (6–12 WCC)
- Head coach: Stan Johnson (6th season)
- Assistant coaches: Lorenzo Romar; Ricky Muench; Louis Wilson; Mark Phelps
- Home arena: Gersten Pavilion

2025–26 West Coast Conference men's basketball standings
	Conf.				Overall
Team	W		L	PCT	W		L	PCT
No. 18 Gonzaga †	16	–	2	.889	31	–	4	.886
Saint Mary's	16	–	2	.889	27	–	6	.818
Santa Clara	15	–	3	.833	26	–	9	.743
Oregon State	9	–	9	.500	17	–	16	.515
San Francisco	8	–	10	.444	17	–	16	.515
Pacific	8	–	10	.444	18	–	15	.545
Seattle	8	–	10	.444	21	–	14	.600
Washington State	7	–	11	.389	12	–	20	.375
Portland	6	–	12	.333	15	–	19	.441
Loyola Marymount	6	–	12	.333	15	–	17	.469
San Diego	5	–	13	.278	12	–	21	.364
Pepperdine	4	–	14	.222	9	–	23	.281
† 2026 WCC tournament winner Rankings from AP poll

The 2025–26 Loyola Marymount Lions men's basketball team represented Loyola Marymount University during the 2025-26 NCAA Division I men's basketball season. The Lions, led by sixth-year head coach Stan Johnson, played their home games at Gersten Pavilion in Los Angeles, California as a member of the West Coast Conference.

== Previous season ==
The Lions finished the 2024–25 season: 17–15, 8–10 in conference play; good for joint-7th place in the conference. They were the 7th seed in the WCC Tournament, would beat 11th seed San Diego in the Second Round, but would lose to 6th seed Washington State in the Third Round.

== Offseason ==
=== Departures ===
Name	Number	Pos.	Height	Weight	Year	Hometown	Reason for departure
Will Johnston	4	G	6'3"	185	Senior	Sydney, Australia	Transferred to Richmond
Jovan Ristic	8	F	6'5"	205	Sophomore	Belgrade, Serbia	Transferred to Saint Anselm
Lamaj Lewis	10	G	6'6"	210	Senior	Paramount, CA	Graduated
Jevon Porter	14	F	6'11"	225	Junior	Columbia, MO	Transferred to Missouri
Matar Diop	21	F	6'10"	213	Sophomore	Dakar, Senegal	Transferred to Stetson
Alex Merkviladze	23	F	6'8"	225	Graduate Student	Kutaisi, Georgia	Graduated
Caleb Stone-Carrawell	25	F	6'7"	210	Graduate Student	Concord, NC	Graduated

=== Incoming transfers ===
Name	Number	Pos.	Height	Weight	Year	Hometown	Previous school
Nakyel Shelton	0	G	6'3"	180	Graduate Student	Chicago, IL	Eastern Illinois
Jalen Shelley	1	F	6'8"	190	Sophomore	Little Elm, TX	USC
Rodney Brown Jr.	2	G	6'6"	180	Junior	Perris, CA	Virginia Tech
Tanner Thomas	13	F	6'6"	215	(redshirt) Senior	Stamford, CT	Sacred Heart
Rokas Jocius	35	F	6'10"	240	Senior	Kaunas, Lithuania	UCF

=== Recruiting classes ===
==== 2025 recruiting class ====
College recruiting
Name	Hometown	School	Height	Weight	Commit date
AJ Thomas; PG	Gilbert, AZ	Eduprize High School	6 ft 3 in (1.91 m)	195 lb (88 kg)	Nov 13, 2024
AJ Thomas; PG	Recruit ratings: 247Sports:				
Josh Dalton; PF	Napa, CA	Golden State Prep	6 ft 10 in (2.08 m)	N/A	May 5, 2025
Josh Dalton; PF	Recruit ratings: No ratings found				
Overall recruit ranking: Scout: nr Rivals: nr ESPN: nr
Note: In many cases, Scout, Rivals, 247Sports, On3, and ESPN may conflict in their listings of height and weight.; In these cases, the average was taken. ESPN grades are on a 100-point scale.; Sources: "Loyola Marymount Lions 2025 Basketball Commitments". Rivals.; "2025 Loyola Marymount Lions Basketball Commits". Scout.; "ESPN 2025 Loyola Marymount Lions Basketball recruits". ESPN.; "Scout.com Team Recruiting Rankings". Scout.; "2025 Team Ranking". Rivals.

==== 2026 recruiting class ====
College recruiting (2026)
Name	Hometown	School	Height	Weight	Commit date
J.J. Harris; SF	Los Angeles, CA	Windward High School	6 ft 6 in (1.98 m)	N/A	May 9, 2025
J.J. Harris; SF	Recruit ratings: 247Sports:				
Overall recruit ranking: Scout: nr Rivals: nr ESPN: nr
Note: In many cases, Scout, Rivals, 247Sports, On3, and ESPN may conflict in their listings of height and weight.; In these cases, the average was taken. ESPN grades are on a 100-point scale.; Sources: "Loyola Marymount Lions 2026 Basketball Commitments". Rivals.; "2026 Loyola Marymount Lions Basketball Commits". Scout.; "ESPN 2026 Loyola Marymount Lions Basketball recruits". ESPN.; "Scout.com Team Recruiting Rankings". Scout.; "2026 Team Ranking". Rivals.

== Roster ==
2025–26 Loyola Marymount Lions men's basketball team
Players
Coaches

Pos.	#	Name	Height	Weight	Year	Previous school	Hometown
G	0	Nakyel Shelton	6 ft 3 in (1.91 m)	185 lb (84 kg)	GS	Carl Schurz HS; Eastern Illinois	Chicago, IL
F	1	Jalen Shelley	6 ft 8 in (2.03 m)	210 lb (95 kg)	So	Link Academy; USC	Little Elm, TX
G	2	Rodney Brown Jr.	6 ft 6 in (1.98 m)	185 lb (84 kg)	Jr	Rancho Christian School; Virginia Tech	Perris, CA
G	3	Marley Zeller	6 ft 5 in (1.96 m)	190 lb (86 kg)	RS Fr	Central Catholic HS	Portland, OR
G	4	AJ Thomas	6 ft 4 in (1.93 m)	180 lb (82 kg)	Fr	Eduprize HS	Lancaster, CA
G	5	M. J. Amey Jr.	6 ft 2 in (1.88 m)	205 lb (93 kg)	RS Sr	Scotland Prep (Pa.); San Jose State	Vacaville, CA
F	6	Josh Dalton	6 ft 10 in (2.08 m)	220 lb (100 kg)	Fr	Golden State Prep	Concord, NC
G	7	Jan Vide	6 ft 6 in (1.98 m)	210 lb (95 kg)	Jr	SEK El Castillo; UCLA	Domžale, Slovenia
F	13	Tanner Thomas	6 ft 6 in (1.98 m)	205 lb (93 kg)	RS Sr	Williston Northampton School; Missouri	Stamford, CT
F	16	Aaron McBride	6 ft 6 in (1.98 m)	230 lb (104 kg)	Jr	Centennial HS	Corona, CA
C	22	Rick Issanza	7 ft 1 in (2.16 m)	245 lb (111 kg)	GS	Bella Vista Prep; Oklahoma	Kinshasa, Congo
G	24	Jael Martin	6 ft 8 in (2.03 m)	205 lb (93 kg)	RS Fr	Carlsbad HS	Carlsbad, CA
F	35	Rokas Jocius	6 ft 10 in (2.08 m)	245 lb (111 kg)	Sr	Vilniaus Perlas Energija; UCF	Kaunas, Lithuania
G	40	Cooper Smith (W)	6 ft 2 in (1.88 m)	180 lb (82 kg)	Fr	Greendale HS	Milwaukee, WC
G	41	Kevin Carney (W)	5 ft 11 in (1.8 m)	160 lb (73 kg)	Sr	Sacred Heart Prep	Menlo Park, CA
F	42	George Tupy (W)	6 ft 6 in (1.98 m)	220 lb (100 kg)	Jr	St. Francis HS	Sierra Madre, CA

Head coach

- Stan Johnson (Bemidji State)

Assistant coach(es)

- Lorenzo Romar (Washington)
- Ricky Muench (Marquette)
- Louis Wilson (William Jewell)
- Mark Phelps (Old Dominion)

Legend

- (C) Team captain
- (S) Suspended
- (I) Ineligible
- (W) Walk-on
- Injured
- Current redshirt

Roster

== Schedule and results ==
Date time, TV	Rank^{#}	Opponent^{#}	Result	Record	High points	High rebounds	High assists	Site (attendance) city, state
Exhibition
October 18, 2025*; 6:30 p.m., ESPN+		USC	L 51–60		16 – Brown Jr.	8 – Issanza	2 – Tied	Gersten Pavilion (2,431); Los Angeles, CA
Non-conference regular season
November 3, 2025*; 7:00 p.m., ESPN+		Lincoln (CA)	W 137–54	1–0	20 – McBride	11 – Dalton	6 – Shelley	Gersten Pavilion (761); Los Angeles, CA
November 5, 2025*; 7:30 p.m., ESPN+		Eastern Washington	W 70–62	2–0	22 – Amey Jr.	12 – Shelley	7 – Vide	Gersten Pavilion (892); Los Angeles, CA
November 8, 2025*; 6:30 p.m., ESPN+		Arkansas–Pine Bluff	W 94–72	3–0	28 – Brown Jr.	7 – Issanza	11 – Vide	Gersten Pavilion (877); Los Angeles, CA
November 11, 2025*; 6:00 p.m., ESPN+		at UTEP	W 71–58	4–0	18 – Amey Jr.	9 – Shelley	7 – Shelley	Don Haskins Center (3,534); El Paso, TX
November 14, 2025*; 7:00 p.m., ESPN+		Troy	W 74–63	5–0	24 – Vide	7 – McBride	5 – Vide	Gersten Pavilion (833); Los Angeles, CA
November 17, 2025*; 6:00 p.m., ESPN+		at UC Santa Barbara	W 78–74 ^{OT}	6–0	29 – Amey	14 – McBride	6 – Brown	The Thunderdome (2,402); Santa Barbara, CA
November 24, 2025*; 5:30 p.m., CBSSN		vs. Florida Atlantic; Sunshine Slam Beach Bracket semifinals	L 65–76	6–1	15 – Shelley	6 – Brown	3 – Brown	Ocean Center (1,236); Daytona Beach, FL
November 25, 2025*; 2:00 p.m., CBSSN		vs. Ohio; Sunshine Slam Beach Bracket 3rd place game	W 70–58	7–1	15 – AJ Thomas	13 – Shelley	3 – Amey Jr.	Ocean Center; Daytona Beach, FL
November 28, 2025*; 7:00 p.m., ESPN+		Stony Brook; Sunshine Slam campus site game	L 68–71	7–2	22 – Jocius	8 – Jocius	2 – Tied	Gersten Pavilion (784); Los Angeles, CA
December 2, 2025*; 7:00 p.m., ESPN+		Saint Louis	L 71–90	7–3	19 – AJ Thomas	5 – AJ Thomas	4 – Amey Jr.	Gersten Pavilion (908); Los Angeles, CA
December 16, 2025*; 8:30 p.m., ESPN+		UC San Diego	L 57–67	7–4	19 – Brown	6 – Shelley	5 – Vide	Gersten Pavilion (747); Los Angeles, CA
December 19, 2025*; 7:00 p.m., ESPN+		North Alabama	W 91–57	8–4	28 – Amey	10 – Shelley	6 – Vide	Gersten Pavilion; Los Angeles, CA
December 23, 2025*; 7:00 p.m., ESPN+		Morgan State	W 83–56	9–4	23 – Brown Jr.	6 – Tied	5 – AJ Thomas	Gersten Pavilion (927); Los Angeles, CA
WCC regular season
December 28, 2025; 4:00 p.m., ESPN+		Saint Mary's	L 73–78	9–5 (0–1)	22 – Brown	7 – Amey Jr.	3 – Shelley	Gersten Pavilion (1,546); Los Angeles, CA
December 30, 2025; 7:00 p.m., ESPN+		Pacific	W 80–71	10–5 (1–1)	20 – Amey Jr.	6 – Tied	5 – Vide	Gersten Pavilion (791); Los Angeles, CA
January 2, 2026; 6:30 p.m., ESPN+		at Washington State	L 76–78	10–6 (1–2)	28 – Vide	9 – Shelley	4 – Shelley	Beasley Coliseum (2,580); Pullman, WA
January 4, 2026; 6:00 p.m., ESPN+		at No. 7 Gonzaga	L 42–87	10–7 (1–3)	11 – Brown Jr.	7 – Jocius	3 – AJ Thomas	McCarthey Athletic Center (6,000); Spokane, WA
January 8, 2026; 8:00 p.m., CBSSN		San Francisco	W 84–82 ^{2OT}	11–7 (2–3)	23 – Vide	10 – Shelley	7 – Vide	Gersten Pavilion (889); Los Angeles, CA
January 10, 2026; 7:00 p.m., ESPN+		at Santa Clara	L 72–103	11–8 (2–4)	18 – Shelley	6 – Tied	3 – Tied	Leavey Center (2,000); Santa Clara, CA
January 14, 2026; 7:00 p.m., ESPN+		at Oregon State	L 70–76	11–9 (2–5)	18 – Amey Jr.	7 – Brown Jr.	5 – Vide	Gill Coliseum (2,669); Corvallis, OR
January 17, 2026; 6:00 p.m., ESPN+		Portland	L 58–71	11–10 (2–6)	19 – Shelley	10 – Shelley	3 – McBride	Gersten Pavilion (1,041); Los Angeles, CA
January 21, 2026; 7:00 p.m., ESPN+		at Seattle	L 59–69	11–11 (2–7)	18 – Amey Jr.	9 – Shelley	4 – Thomas	Redhawk Center (819); Seattle, WA
January 28, 2026; 7:00 p.m., ESPN+		Oregon State	L 69–72	11–12 (2–8)	10 – Vide	6 – Tied	7 – Shelley	Gersten Pavilion (1,016); Los Angeles, CA
January 31, 2026; 6:00 p.m., ESPN+		Santa Clara	L 73–104	11–13 (2–9)	18 – Amey Jr.	7 – Tied	4 – Thomas	Gersten Pavilion (1,178); Los Angeles, CA
February 4, 2026; 7:00 p.m., ESPN+		San Francisco	W 84–75	12–13 (3–9)	27 – Shelley	8 – Vide	6 – Shelley	Sobrato Center (1,878); San Francisco, CA
February 7, 2026; 6:00 p.m., ESPN+		San Diego	W 83–63	13–13 (4–9)	24 – Shelley	10 – McBride	2 – Tied	Gersten Pavilion (965); Los Angeles, CA
February 11, 2026; 7:00 p.m., ESPN+		at Pacific	L 59–65	13–14 (4–10)	19 – Vide	6 – Vide	3 – Vide	Alex G. Spanos Center (1,169); Stockton, CA
February 14, 2026; 2:00 p.m., ESPN+		at Pepperdine	L 89–90	13–15 (4–11)	25 – Amey Jr.	11 – Jocius	5 – Vide	Firestone Fieldhouse (699); Malibu, CA
February 21, 2026; 3:00 p.m., ESPN+		at San Diego	W 77–65	14–15 (5–11)	23 – Vide	4 – Tied	3 – Tied	Jenny Craig Pavilion (1,671); San Diego, CA
February 25, 2026; 8:00 p.m., ESPNU		Washington State	W 67–66	15–15 (6–11)	31 – Amey Jr.	8 – McBride	7 – Vide	Gersten Pavilion (994); Los Angeles, CA
February 28, 2026; 6:00 p.m., ESPN+		Seattle	L 66–71	15–16 (6–12)	21 – McBride	10 – Issanza	5 – Vide	Gersten Pavilion (1,192); Los Angeles, CA
WCC tournament
March 5, 2026; 8:30 p.m., ESPN+	(10)	vs. (11) San Diego; First Round	L 62–66	15–17	21 – McBride	8 – McBride	5 – Vide	Orleans Arena (1,242); Paradise, NV
*Non-conference game. ^{#}Rankings from AP Poll. (#) Tournament seedings in parentheses.
