= 2025–26 Oregon State Beavers men's basketball team =

American college basketball season

2025–26 Oregon State Beavers men's basketball
- Conference: West Coast Conference
- Record: 17–16 (9–9 WCC)
- Head coach: Wayne Tinkle (12th season)
- Assistant coaches: Marlon Stewart (7th season); Stephen Thompson (11th season); Chris Haslam (2nd season); Roberto Nelson (3rd season)
- Home arena: Gill Coliseum (Capacity: 9,301)

2025–26 West Coast Conference men's basketball standings
	Conf.				Overall
Team	W		L	PCT	W		L	PCT
No. 18 Gonzaga †	16	–	2	.889	31	–	4	.886
Saint Mary's	16	–	2	.889	27	–	6	.818
Santa Clara	15	–	3	.833	26	–	9	.743
Oregon State	9	–	9	.500	17	–	16	.515
San Francisco	8	–	10	.444	17	–	16	.515
Pacific	8	–	10	.444	18	–	15	.545
Seattle	8	–	10	.444	21	–	14	.600
Washington State	7	–	11	.389	12	–	20	.375
Portland	6	–	12	.333	15	–	19	.441
Loyola Marymount	6	–	12	.333	15	–	17	.469
San Diego	5	–	13	.278	12	–	21	.364
Pepperdine	4	–	14	.222	9	–	23	.281
† 2026 WCC tournament winner Rankings from AP poll

The 2025–26 Oregon State Beavers men's basketball team represented Oregon State University during the 2025–26 NCAA Division I men's basketball season. The Beavers, led by twelfth- and final-year head coach Wayne Tinkle, played their home games at Gill Coliseum in Corvallis, Oregon as a member of the West Coast Conference. This marked the second and final year of Oregon State's affiliate membership with the West Coast Conference before transitioning back to the reformed Pac-12 Conference on July 1, 2026.

On February 26, the school announced that Tinkle would not be retained for the 2026–27 season. He was given the option to coach the rest of the season, and chose to do so.

== Previous season ==
The Beavers finished the 2025-26 season 20–13, 10–8 in WCC play to finish fifth in the conference. As the 5-seed in the WCC Tournament, they were defeated by 9-seed Pepperdine 73–77 in the third round. The Beavers were invited to participate in the inaugural College Basketball Crown, where they were defeated in the first round by UCF 75–76 to end their season.

== Offseason ==
=== Departures ===
Name	Number	Pos.	Height	Weight	Year	Hometown	Reason for departure
Damarco Minor	0	G	6'0"	190	Senior	Chicago, IL	Transferred to Pittsburgh
DaJohn Craig	3	G	6'1"	160	Sophomore	Indianapolis, IN	Transferred to Coastal Carolina
Nate Kingz	4	F	6'5"	190	(redshirt) Junior	Salem, OR	Transferred to Syracuse
Grey Garrison	10	G	6'7"	200	Sophomore	Bellingham, WA	Transferred to Henderson State
Parsa Fallah	11	F	6'9"	260	(redshirt) Junior	Amol, Iran	Transferred to Oklahoma State
Michael Rataj	12	F	6'9"	220	Junior	Augsburg, Germany	Transferred to Baylor
Thomas Ndong	22	F	6'10"	245	Sophomore	Montreal, QC, Canada	Out of eligibility
Liutauras Lelevicius	37	G	6'7"	217	(redshirt) Sophomore	Kaunas, Lithuania	Transferred to TCU
Maxim Logue	77	F	6'9"	215	Freshman	Lyon, France	Transferred to Florida Atlantic

=== Incoming transfers ===
Name	Number	Pos.	Height	Weight	Year	Hometown	Previous college
Dez White	0	G	6'2"	180	Junior	Jefferson City, MO	Missouri State
Malcolm Cristie	3	G	6'5"	200	Senior	Fredericton, NB, Canada	Oakland
Yaak Yaak	4	C	6'11"	230	Junior	Adelaide, Australia	Colorado Mesa
Keziah Ekissi	7	G	6'3"	210	Freshman	Saintes-Maries-de-la-Mer, France	Howard College
Stephen Olowoniyi	12	F	6'8"	210	Junior	Melbourne, Australia	Southern Indiana
Jorge Diaz Graham	30	F	6'11"	205	Senior	Canary Islands, Spain	Pittsburgh
Noah Amenhauser	40	C	7'2"	270	Junior	Goodyear, AZ	Coastal Carolina

=== 2025 recruiting class ===
College recruiting
Name	Hometown	School	Height	Weight	Commit date
Matija Samar; SG	Jesenice, Slovenia	CB Ciudad de Ponferrada	6 ft 6 in (1.98 m)	190 lb (86 kg)	Jun 20, 2025
Matija Samar; SG	Recruit ratings: No ratings found				
Olavi Suutela; PF	Helsinki, Finland	HBA-Märsky	6 ft 10 in (2.08 m)	N/A	Nov 19, 2024
Olavi Suutela; PF	Recruit ratings: No ratings found				
Overall recruit ranking: Scout: – Rivals: –
Note: In many cases, Scout, Rivals, 247Sports, On3, and ESPN may conflict in their listings of height and weight.; In these cases, the average was taken. ESPN grades are on a 100-point scale.; Sources: "2025 Oregon State Basketball Recruiting Commits". Scout.; "Scout.com Team Recruiting Rankings". Scout.; "2025 Team Ranking". Rivals.

== Roster ==
2025–26 Oregon State Beavers men's basketball team
Players
Coaches

Pos.	#	Name	Height	Weight	Year	Previous school	Hometown
G	0	Dez White	6 ft 2 in (1.88 m)	180 lb (82 kg)	Jr	Missouri State	Jefferson City, Missouri
G	1	Ja'Quavis Williford	6 ft 7 in (2.01 m)	190 lb (86 kg)	So	Red Rock Academy	Tampa, Florida
G	2	Josiah Lake II	6 ft 2 in (1.88 m)	190 lb (86 kg)	Jr	Tualatin HS	Tualatin, Oregon
G	3	Malcolm Christie	6 ft 5 in (1.96 m)	200 lb (91 kg)	Sr	Oakland	Fredericton, New Brunswick, Canada
C	4	Yaak Yaak	6 ft 11 in (2.11 m)	230 lb (104 kg)	Jr	Colorado Mesa	Adelaide, Australia
F	6	Kaan Yarkut	6 ft 6 in (1.98 m)	210 lb (95 kg)	So	Türk Telekom B.K.	Ankara, Turkey
G	7	Keziah Ekissi	6 ft 3 in (1.91 m)	210 lb (95 kg)	Fr	Howard College	Saintes-Maries-de-la-Mer, France
F	8	Gavin Marrs	7 ft 0 in (2.13 m)	215 lb (98 kg)	Jr	Ellensburg HS	Ellensburg, Washington
F	12	Stephen Olowoniyi	6 ft 8 in (2.03 m)	210 lb (95 kg)	Jr	Southern Indiana	Melbourne, Australia
F	13	Isaiah Sy	6 ft 7 in (2.01 m)	200 lb (91 kg)	Jr	Cloud County CC	Marseille, France
F	24	Johan Munch	6 ft 11 in (2.11 m)	222 lb (101 kg)	So	Orangeville Academy	Copenhagen, Denmark
G	26	Matija Samar	6 ft 6 in (1.98 m)	190 lb (86 kg)	Fr	CB Ciudad de Ponferrada	Jesenice, Slovenia
F	30	Jorge Diaz Graham	6 ft 11 in (2.11 m)	205 lb (93 kg)	Sr	Pittsburgh	Canary Islands, Spain
F	37	Olavi Suutela	6 ft 10 in (2.08 m)	220 lb (100 kg)	Fr	HBA-Märsky	Helsinki, Finland
C	40	Noah Amenhauser	7 ft 2 in (2.18 m)	270 lb (122 kg)	Jr	Coastal Carolina	Goodyear, Arizona

Head coach

- Wayne Tinkle (Montana)

Assistant coach(es)

- Marlon Stewart (North Dakota)
- Stephen Thompson (Syracuse)
- Chris Haslam (Wyoming)
- Roberto Nelson (Oregon State)

Legend

- (C) Team captain
- (S) Suspended
- (I) Ineligible
- (W) Walk-on
- Injured
- Current redshirt

Roster
Last update: 2025-10-27

== Schedule and results ==
Date time, TV	Rank^{#}	Opponent^{#}	Result	Record	High points	High rebounds	High assists	Site (attendance) city, state
Exhibition
October 25, 2025*; 2:00 p.m.		Western Oregon	W 73–44		13 – Munch	8 – Yaak	5 – Lake II	Gill Coliseum (-); Corvallis, OR
Non-conference regular season
November 3, 2025*; 5:30 p.m., ESPN+		North Dakota State	W 67–65	1–0	12 – Sy	8 – Lake II	5 – Lake II	Gill Coliseum (2,829); Corvallis, OR
November 7, 2025*; 7:00 p.m., ESPN+		UIC	W 76–73	2–0	22 – Lake II	10 – Munch	6 – Samar	Gill Coliseum (3,476); Corvallis, OR
November 12, 2025*; 6:30 p.m., ESPN+		North Texas	W 66–64	3–0	10 – Tied	6 – Munch	3 – Lake II	Gill Coliseum (2,561); Corvallis, OR
November 17, 2025*; 7:00 p.m., FS1		at Oregon; Rivalry	L 75–87	3–1	14 – Sy	4 – Tied	3 – Lake II	Matthew Knight Arena (7,616); Eugene, OR
November 21, 2025*; 5:00 p.m., ESPN+		vs. Evansville; Paradise Jam quarterfinals	L 69–73	3–2	17 – Amenhauser	5 – Amenhauser	5 – Sy	Sports and Fitness Center (1,012); Charlotte Amalie West, VI
November 22, 2025*; 2:30 p.m., ESPN+		vs. Iona; Paradise Jam consolation semifinals	L 84–91 ^{2OT}	3–3	20 – Amenhauser	10 – Amenhauser	5 – Munch	Sports and Fitness Center (1,824); Charlotte Amalie West, VI
November 24, 2025*; 9:30 a.m., ESPN+		vs. UMass; Paradise Jam 7th place game	L 65–73	3–4	17 – Christie	7 – Suutela	3 – Sy	Sports and Fitness Center; Charlotte Amalie West, VI
November 29, 2025*; 7:00 p.m., ESPN+		California Baptist	L 69–75	3–5	14 – White	8 – Tied	4 – Lake II	Gill Coliseum (2,130); Corvallis, OR
December 3, 2025*; 6:30 p.m., ESPN+		Vermont	W 80–58	4–5	18 – Lake II	6 – Suutela	5 – Suutela	Gill Coliseum (2,361); Corvallis, OR
December 6, 2025*; 2:00 p.m., ESPN+		Southern Utah	W 81–70	5–5	20 – White	8 – Lake II	5 – Diaz Graham	Gill Coliseum (2,364); Corvallis, OR
December 13, 2025*; 2:00 p.m., ESPN+		Montana State	W 67–57	6–5	16 – Lake II	8 – Tied	6 – Lake II	Gill Coliseum (2,292); Corvallis, OR
December 17, 2025*; 6:30 p.m., ESPN+		Sam Houston	L 75–85	6–6	19 – Lake II	5 – Tied	4 – Lake II	Gill Coliseum (2,011); Corvallis, OR
December 21, 2025*; 12:00 p.m., ESPN+		at Arizona State	W 78–75	7–6	23 – Lake II	9 – Diaz Graham	9 – Lake II	Desert Financial Arena (7,896); Tempe, AZ
WCC regular season
December 28, 2025; 3:00 p.m., ESPN+		Santa Clara	L 64–102	7–7 (0–1)	19 – Lake II	4 – Tied	5 – Lake II	Gill Coliseum (3,050); Corvallis, OR
December 30, 2025; 7:00 p.m., ESPN+		San Francisco	W 70–62	8–7 (1–1)	18 – Sy	8 – White	6 – White	Gill Coliseum (2,506); Corvallis, OR
January 2, 2026; 7:00 p.m., ESPN+		at Pacific	L 53–84	8–8 (1–2)	12 – Tied	6 – Sy	3 – White	Alex G. Spanos Center (1,104); Stockton, CA
January 4, 2026; 4:30 p.m., ESPN+		at Washington State	L 67–81	8–9 (1–3)	16 – White	5 – Suutela	5 – Lake II	Numerica Veterans Arena (3,369); Spokane, WA
January 8, 2026; 7:00 p.m., ESPN+		Seattle	W 68–55	9–9 (2–3)	13 – Tied	6 – Yaak	7 – Lake II	Gill Coliseum (3,273); Corvallis, OR
January 10, 2026; 5:00 p.m., ESPN+		at Portland	L 76–82	9–10 (2–4)	19 – Suutela	7 – Sy	6 – Lake II	Chiles Center (1,894); Portland, OR
January 14, 2026; 7:00 p.m., ESPN+		LMU	W 76–70	10–10 (3–4)	25 – Sy	11 – Sy	3 – Tied	Gill Coliseum (2,669); Corvallis, OR
January 17, 2026; 3:00 p.m., ESPN+		Pacific	L 64–81	10–11 (3–5)	13 – Yaak	5 – Yaak	2 – Tied	Gill Coliseum (2,624); Corvallis, OR
January 21, 2026; 8:00 p.m., CBSSN		at Saint Mary's	L 51–81	10–12 (3–6)	17 – Lake II	6 – Munch	2 – Tied	University Credit Union Pavilion (3,390); Moraga, CA
January 28, 2026; 7:00 p.m., ESPN+		at LMU	W 72–69	11–12 (4–6)	13 – Lake II	10 – Munch	3 – Lake II	Gersten Pavilion (1,016); Los Angeles, CA
January 31, 2026; 3:00 p.m., ESPN+		at San Diego	W 78–76	12–12 (5–6)	15 – Munch	9 – Munch	8 – Lake II	Jenny Craig Pavilion (1,433); San Diego, CA
February 4, 2026; 8:00 p.m., CBSSN		Washington State	W 74–64	13–12 (6–6)	22 – Lake II	15 – Munch	4 – Ekissi	Gill Coliseum (3,626); Corvallis, OR
February 7, 2026; 3:00 p.m., ESPN+		No. 6 Gonzaga	L 61–81	13–13 (6–7)	13 – Sy	4 – Lake II	6 – White	Gill Coliseum (7,865); Corvallis, OR
February 12, 2026; 6:00 p.m., ESPN		at San Francisco	W 90–63	14–13 (7–7)	18 – Diaz Graham	16 – Sy	7 – Lake II	Sobrato Center (2,249); San Francisco, CA
February 15, 2026; 5:00 p.m., ESPN+		at Seattle	L 50–60	14–14 (7–8)	14 – Samar	6 – Tied	2 – Tied	Redhawk Center (999); Seattle, WA
February 21, 2026; 3:00 p.m., ESPN+		Pepperdine	W 83–73	15–14 (8–8)	18 – Lake II	12 – Munch	8 – Lake II	Gill Coliseum (3,146); Corvallis, OR
February 25, 2026; 7:00 p.m., ESPN+		San Diego	W 92–82 ^{OT}	16–14 (9–8)	19 – Munch	12 – Sy	9 – Lake II	Gill Coliseum (2,626); Corvallis, OR
February 28, 2026; 5:00 p.m., CBSSN		at Santa Clara	L 72–93	16–15 (9–9)	19 – Munch	7 – Diaz Graham	6 – Ekissi	Leavey Center (2,388); Santa Clara, CA
WCC tournament
March 8, 2026; 5:30 p.m., ESPN2	(4)	vs. (5) San Francisco; Quarterfinal	W 78–77	17–15	18 – Tied	6 – Sy	7 – Lake II	Orleans Arena (3,021); Paradise, NV
March 9, 2026; 6:00 p.m., ESPN	(4)	vs. (1) No. 12 Gonzaga; Semifinal	L 56–65	17–16	15 – Diaz Graham	9 – Diaz Graham	4 – Lake II	Orleans Arena (6,087); Paradise, NV
*Non-conference game. ^{#}Rankings from AP Poll. (#) Tournament seedings in parentheses. All times are in Pacific Time.
