= 2025–26 Portland Pilots men's basketball team =

American college basketball season

2025–26 Portland Pilots men's basketball
- Conference: West Coast Conference
- Record: 15–19 (6–12 WCC)
- Head coach: Shantay Legans (5th season)
- Assistant coaches: Arturo Ormond; Mark Berokoff; Anthony Separovich; Decclan Mclean; Matthew Meyer
- Home arena: Chiles Center

2025–26 West Coast Conference men's basketball standings
	Conf.				Overall
Team	W		L	PCT	W		L	PCT
No. 18 Gonzaga †	16	–	2	.889	31	–	4	.886
Saint Mary's	16	–	2	.889	27	–	6	.818
Santa Clara	15	–	3	.833	26	–	9	.743
Oregon State	9	–	9	.500	17	–	16	.515
San Francisco	8	–	10	.444	17	–	16	.515
Pacific	8	–	10	.444	18	–	15	.545
Seattle	8	–	10	.444	21	–	14	.600
Washington State	7	–	11	.389	12	–	20	.375
Portland	6	–	12	.333	15	–	19	.441
Loyola Marymount	6	–	12	.333	15	–	17	.469
San Diego	5	–	13	.278	12	–	21	.364
Pepperdine	4	–	14	.222	9	–	23	.281
† 2026 WCC tournament winner Rankings from AP poll

The 2025–26 Portland Pilots men's basketball team represented the University of Portland during the 2025–26 NCAA Division I men's basketball season. The Pilots, led by fifth-year head coach Shantay Legans, played their home games at the Chiles Center as members of the West Coast Conference.

== Previous season ==
The Pilots finished the 2024–25 season 12–20, 7–11 in WCC play to finish in eighth place. They lost in second round to Pepperdine in the WCC Tournament.

== Offseason ==
=== Departures ===
Name	Number	Pos.	Height	Weight	Year	Hometown	Reason for departure
Mezziah Oakman	1	C	7'0"	230	(redshirt) Junior	New York, NY	Transferred to Cal State Monterey Bay
Max Mackinnon	3	G	6'6"	200	Junior	Brisbane, Australia	Transferred to LSU
Jinup Dobuol	4	G	6'8"	180	Freshman	Saint Paul, MN	Transferred to Monmouth
Chris Austin	5	G	6'4"	210	Graduate Student	Pasadena, CA	Graduated
Vukasin Masic	7	G	6'5"	210	(redshirt) Senior	Belgrade, Serbia	Transferred to San Francisco
Coleman Lemke	10	F	6'8"	190	(redshirt) Junior	Las Vegas, NV	Walk-on; transferred
Vincent Delano	11	G	6'2"	175	(redshirt) Freshman	Phoenix, AZ	Transferred to Northern Colorado
Jude Harris	13	G	6'5"	205	(redshirt) Freshman	Manhattan Beach, CA	Walk-on; transferred to Point Loma Nazarene
Wyatt Miller	20	G	5'10"	165	Freshman	Santa Barbara, CA	Walk-on; transferred
Austin Rapp	22	F	6'10"	230	Freshman	Melbourne, Australia	Transferred to Wisconsin
Todd Jones	23	F	6'9"	205	Freshman	New Orleans, LA	Transferred to Louisiana
Bol Dengdit	24	F	6'11"	210	(redshirt) Sophomore	Melbourne, Australia	Transferred to UC San Diego

=== Incoming transfers ===
Name	Number	Pos.	Height	Weight	Year	Hometown	Previous School
Matúš Hronský	7	F	6'8"	205	Senior	Poruba, Slovakia	Duquesne
Garrett Nuckolls	10	G	6'6"	193	Junior	Bullard, TX	Trinity Valley CC
Riley Parker	11	G	6'2"	195	Senior	Mandurah, Australia	Saint Francis (PA)
James O'Donnell	14	F	6' 10"	230	Sophomore	Sydney, Australia	San Francisco

== Roster ==
2025–26 Portland Pilots men's basketball team
Players
Coaches

Pos.	#	Name	Height	Weight	Year	Previous school	Hometown
C	1	Jermaine Ballisager Webb	7 ft 1 in (2.16 m)	250 lb (113 kg)	Sr	Montverde; American	Stjær, Denmark
G	2	Sam Noland (W)	6 ft 1 in (1.85 m)	185 lb (84 kg)	GS	Tualatin HS; Pacific Lutheran	Tualatin, OR
F	3	Timo George	6 ft 8 in (2.03 m)	245 lb (111 kg)	Fr	IMG Academy	Amsterdam, Netherlands
G	5	Dante Censori-Hercules	6 ft 7 in (2.01 m)	190 lb (86 kg)	Fr	Holdan Prep	Bolton, ON
F	7	Matúš Hronský	6 ft 8 in (2.03 m)	205 lb (93 kg)	Sr	Wasatch Academy (UT); Duquesne	Poruba, Slovakia
G	8	Preston Lee (W)	5 ft 11 in (1.8 m)	185 lb (84 kg)	So	Orange Lutheran HS	Laguna Hills, CA
G	9	Carlin Briggs (W)	6 ft 7 in (2.01 m)	190 lb (86 kg)	RS Fr	Centre of Excellence	Melbourne, Australia
G	10	Garrett Nuckolls	6 ft 6 in (1.98 m)	195 lb (88 kg)	Jr	Bullard HS; Trinity Valley CC	Bullard, TX
G	11	Riley Parker	6 ft 2 in (1.88 m)	195 lb (88 kg)	Jr	Mandurah Catholic College; Saint Francis (PA)	Mandurah, Australia
G	12	Kelson Gebbers (W)	6 ft 7 in (2.01 m)	200 lb (91 kg)	RS So	Brewster HS	Brewster, WA
G	13	Marchelo Moreira (W)	6 ft 3 in (1.91 m)	190 lb (86 kg)	So	IMG Academy; Allegheny College	Abu Dhabi, United Arab Emirates
F	14	James O'Donnell	6 ft 10 in (2.08 m)	230 lb (104 kg)	So	Centre of Excellence; San Francisco	Sydney, Australia
G	21	NaVaughn Long (W)	6 ft 6 in (1.98 m)	180 lb (82 kg)	RS Fr	Granada HS	Livermore, CA
G	23	Joel Foxwell	6 ft 1 in (1.85 m)	180 lb (82 kg)	Fr	Melbourne United	Melbourne, Australia
F	35	Cameron Williams	6 ft 8 in (2.03 m)	220 lb (100 kg)	Jr	Cape Central HS; Moberly CC; Trinity Valley CC	Cape Girardeau, MO
G	44	Mikah Ballew	6 ft 5 in (1.96 m)	200 lb (91 kg)	So	SoCal Academy	Palmdale, CA

Head coach

- Shantay Legans (Fresno State)

Assistant coach(es)

- Arturo Ormond (UTPA)
- Mark Berokoff (Regis)
- Anthony Separovich (Bloomfield)
- Decclan Mclean (Swinburne Tech)
- Matthew Mayer (Illinois)

Legend

- (C) Team captain
- (S) Suspended
- (I) Ineligible
- (W) Walk-on
- Injured
- Current redshirt

Roster

== Schedule and results ==
Date time, TV	Rank^{#}	Opponent^{#}	Result	Record	High points	High rebounds	High assists	Site (attendance) city, state
Non-conference regular season
November 3, 2025*; 7:00 p.m., ESPN+		Willamette	W 120–83	1–0	25 – Williams	10 – Nuckolls	5 – Tied	Chiles Center (1,008); Portland, OR
November 6, 2025*; 7:30 p.m., ESPN+		Arkansas–Pine Bluff	W 83–74	2–0	15 – Ballew	10 – O'Donnell	10 – Foxwell	Chiles Center (792); Portland, OR
November 9, 2025*; 7:30 p.m., ESPN+		UC Davis	W 67–63	3–0	23 – Foxwell	6 – George	3 – Foxwell	Chiles Center (948); Portland, OR
November 15, 2025*; 6:00 p.m., MW Network		at Wyoming	L 56–93	3–1	12 – George	7 – George	2 – Tied	Arena-Auditorium (3,428); Laramie, WY
November 21, 2025*; 7:00 pm, ESPN+		Cal State Fullerton; Portland Invitational	W 103–85	4–1	24 – Foxwell	8 – O'Donnell	6 – Ballisager Webb	Chiles Center (1,118); Portland, OR
November 22, 2025*; 5:00 pm, ESPN+		Northern Colorado; Portland Invitational	L 80–86 ^{OT}	4–2	15 – Williams	8 – Foxwell	10 – Foxwell	Chiles Center (1,116); Portland, OR
November 23, 2025*; 1:00 pm, ESPN+		St. Thomas; Portland Invitational	L 66–76	4–3	17 – George	9 – Williams	8 – Foxwell	Chiles Center (983); Portland, OR
November 26, 2025*; 7:00 p.m., ESPN+		Long Beach State	W 93–73	5–3	19 – Tied	6 – George	7 – Foxwell	Chiles Center (829); Portland, OR
December 1, 2025*; 7:00 p.m., ACCNX/ESPN+		at Stanford	L 72–94	5–4	22 – Williams	9 – O'Donnell	3 – Tied	Maples Pavilion (2,284); Stanford, CA
December 5, 2025*; 7:00 p.m., ESPN+		Lewis & Clark	W 104–87	6–4	32 – O'Donnell	10 – O'Donnell	10 – Foxwell	Chiles Center (470); Portland, OR
December 14, 2025*; 2:00 p.m., ESPN+		Kent State	W 88–78	7–4	20 – Williams	8 – Nuckolls	15 – Foxwell	Chiles Center (1,033); Portland, OR
December 17, 2025*; 8:00 p.m., BTN		at Oregon	L 69–94	7–5	21 – Foxwell	11 – Williams	8 – Foxwell	Matthew Knight Arena (4,479); Eugene, OR
December 22, 2025*; 2:00 pm, ESPN+		at UC Santa Barbara	L 61–79	7–6	15 – O'Donnell	7 – Williams	7 – Foxwell	The Thunderdome (3,022); Santa Barbara, CA
WCC regular season
December 28, 2025; 2:00 p.m., ESPN+		Washington State	L 62–67	7–7 (0–1)	15 – Tied	8 – Ballisager Webb	6 – Foxwell	Chiles Center (1,448); Portland, OR
December 30, 2025; 7:00 p.m., ESPN+		Santa Clara	L 85–92	7–8 (0–2)	20 – Foxwell	5 – Tied	15 – Foxwell	Chiles Center (1,521); Portland, OR
January 2, 2026; 7:00 p.m., ESPN+		at Saint Mary's	L 57–78	7–9 (0–3)	13 – Ballisager Webb	12 – Censori-Hercules	6 – Foxwell	University Credit Union Pavilion (3,372); Moraga, CA
January 4, 2026; 4:00 p.m., ESPN+		at San Francisco	L 68–73	7–10 (0–4)	21 – Williams	6 – Williams	6 – Foxwell	Sobrato Center (1,088); San Francisco, CA
January 8, 2026; 7:00 p.m., ESPN+		Pacific	W 90–89 ^{OT}	8–10 (1–4)	27 – Tied	10 – Williams	7 – Foxwell	Chiles Center (1,091); Portland, OR
January 10, 2026; 5:00 p.m., ESPN+		Oregon State	W 82–76	9–10 (2–4)	23 – Williams	7 – Williams	5 – Foxwell	Chiles Center (1,894); Portland, OR
January 14, 2026; 6:00 p.m., ESPN+		at Pepperdine	L 63–67	9–11 (2–5)	14 – Williams	12 – Williams	10 – Foxwell	Firestone Fieldhouse (671); Malibu, CA
January 17, 2026; 6:00 p.m., ESPN+		at Loyola Marymount	W 71–58	10–11 (3–5)	18 – Foxwell	9 – O'Donnell	5 – Foxwell	Gersten Pavilion (1,041); Los Angeles, CA
January 24, 2026; 5:00 p.m., ESPN+		Saint Mary's	L 69–75	10–12 (3–6)	27 – Foxwell	6 – Ballisager Webb	5 – Foxwell	Chiles Center (1,679); Portland, OR
January 28, 2026; 7:00 p.m., ESPN+		at Pacific	L 51–74	10–13 (3–7)	13 – Foxwell	7 – Ballisager Webb	3 – Foxwell	Alex G. Spanos Center (1,613); Stockton, CA
January 31, 2026; 3:00 p.m., ESPN+		at Washington State	L 74–104	10–14 (3–8)	21 – Foxwell	9 – Censori-Hercules	2 – Tied	Beasley Coliseum (2,857); Pullman, WA
February 4, 2026; 7:00 p.m., ESPN+		No. 6 Gonzaga	W 87–80	11–14 (4–8)	27 – Foxwell	9 – Ballisager Webb	8 – Foxwell	Chiles Center (3,345); Portland, OR
February 7, 2026; 5:00 p.m., ESPN+		Seattle	W 54–53	12–14 (5–8)	13 – O'Donnell	8 – Foxwell	9 – Foxwell	Chiles Center (2,059); Portland, OR
February 11, 2026; 6:30 p.m., ESPN+		at San Diego	L 58–71	12–15 (5–9)	12 – Tied	8 – Censori-Hercules	6 – Foxwell	Jenny Craig Pavilion (1,345); San Diego, CA
February 18, 2026; 7:00 p.m., ESPN+		Pepperdine	L 87–95	12–16 (5–10)	35 – Foxwell	5 – Ballisager Webb	8 – Foxwell	Chiles Center (1,493); Portland, OR
February 21, 2026; 7:00 p.m., ESPN+		at Seattle	L 59–71	12–17 (5–11)	20 – Foxwell	7 – Ballisager Webb	3 – Foxwell	Redhawk Center (999); Seattle, WA
February 25, 2026; 6:00 p.m., ESPN+		at No. 9 Gonzaga	L 48–89	12–18 (5–12)	12 – Foxwell	6 – Ballisager Webb	4 – Censori-Hercules	McCarthey Athletic Center (6,000); Spokane, WA
February 28, 2026; 1:00 p.m., ESPN+		San Diego	W 87–74	13–18 (6–12)	20 – Nuckolls	7 – Foxwell	6 – Foxwell	Chiles Center (1,239); Portland, OR
WCC tournament
March 5, 2026; 6:00 p.m., ESPN+	(9)	vs. (12) Pepperdine; First Round	W 77–68	14–18	22 – Ballisager Webb	9 – Censori-Hercules	8 – Foxwell	Orleans Arena (1,242); Paradise, NV
March 6, 2026; 6:00 p.m., ESPN+	(9)	vs. (8) Washington State; Second Round	W 74–68	15–18	23 – Nuckolls	12 – Ballisager Webb	5 – Foxwell	Orleans Arena (1,890); Paradise, NV
March 7, 2026; 6:00 p.m., ESPN+	(9)	vs. (5) San Francisco; Third Round	L 65–82	15–19	16 – Foxwell	6 – O'Donnell	6 – Foxwell	Orleans Arena (2,505); Paradise, NV
*Non-conference game. ^{#}Rankings from AP Poll. (#) Tournament seedings in parentheses. All times are in Pacific Time.
