= 2025–26 Saint Mary's Gaels men's basketball team =

American college basketball season

2025–26 Saint Mary's Gaels men's basketball

WCC regular season co-champions

NCAA tournament, First round
- Conference: West Coast Conference
- Record: 27–6 (16–2 WCC)
- Head coach: Randy Bennett (25th season)
- Associate head coach: Mickey McConnell; Joe Rahon
- Assistant coaches: E. J. Rowland; Dan Sheets; Trey Touchet
- Home arena: University Credit Union Pavilion (Capacity: 3,500)

2025–26 West Coast Conference men's basketball standings
	Conf.				Overall
Team	W		L	PCT	W		L	PCT
No. 18 Gonzaga †	16	–	2	.889	31	–	4	.886
Saint Mary's	16	–	2	.889	27	–	6	.818
Santa Clara	15	–	3	.833	26	–	9	.743
Oregon State	9	–	9	.500	17	–	16	.515
San Francisco	8	–	10	.444	17	–	16	.515
Pacific	8	–	10	.444	18	–	15	.545
Seattle	8	–	10	.444	21	–	14	.600
Washington State	7	–	11	.389	12	–	20	.375
Portland	6	–	12	.333	15	–	19	.441
Loyola Marymount	6	–	12	.333	15	–	17	.469
San Diego	5	–	13	.278	12	–	21	.364
Pepperdine	4	–	14	.222	9	–	23	.281
† 2026 WCC tournament winner Rankings from AP poll

The 2025–26 Saint Mary's Gaels men's basketball team represented Saint Mary's College of California during the 2025–26 NCAA Division I men's basketball season. The team was led by head coach Randy Bennett in his 25th and final season at Saint Mary's. The Gaels played their home games at the University Credit Union Pavilion (Note: Formerly known as McKeon Pavilion) in Moraga, California, as members of the West Coast Conference (WCC).

== Previous season ==
The Gaels finished the 2024–25 season 29–6, 17–1 in WCC play to win the regular season championship. As the No. 1 seed in the WCC tournament, they defeated Pepperdine in the semifinals and before losing to Gonzaga in the championship. They received an at-large bid to the NCAA tournament as the No. 5 seed in the East region, they defeated Vanderbilt in the first round before losing to Alabama in the second round.

== Offseason ==
=== Departures ===
Name	Number	Pos.	Height	Weight	Year	Hometown	Reason for departure
Jordan Ross	2	G	6'3"	190	Sophomore	Layton, UT	Transferred to Georgia
Augustas Marčiulionis	3	G	6'4"	200	Senior	Vilnius, Lithuania	Graduated/undrafted in 2025 NBA draft; signed with the Los Angeles Lakers
Ashton Hardaway	9	F	6'8"	210	Sophomore	Carson, CA	Transferred to Memphis
Mitchell Saxen	11	C	6'11"	250	Graduate Student	Seattle, WA	Graduated
Luke Barrett	33	G/F	6'6"	215	(redshirt) Senior	Piedmont, CA	Graduated

=== Incoming transfers ===
Name	Number	Pos.	Height	Weight	Year	Hometown	Previous School
Tony Duckett	2	G	6'5"	185	Sophomore	Carlsbad, CA	San Diego
Jazz Gardner	32	C	7'0"	230	Junior	Pasadena, CA	Pacific

=== 2025 recruiting class ===
College recruiting information
Name	Hometown	School	Height	Weight	Commit date
Dillan Shaw #19 SF	Northridge, CA	Heritage Christian School	6 ft 6 in (1.98 m)	180 lb (82 kg)	Nov 15, 2024
Dillan Shaw #19 SF	Recruit ratings: Rivals: 247Sports: ESPN: (82)				
Trent MacLean #54 C	Westwood Village, CA	Southern California Academy	6 ft 10 in (2.08 m)	200 lb (91 kg)	Apr 23, 2025
Trent MacLean #54 C	Recruit ratings: Rivals: 247Sports: ESPN: (77)				
Mantas Juzėnas; SF	Kaunas, Lithuania	Žalgiris Kaunas	6 ft 6 in (1.98 m)	215 lb (98 kg)	Dec 24, 2024
Mantas Juzėnas; SF	Recruit ratings: Rivals: 247Sports: ESPN: (NR)				
Overall recruit ranking: Scout: nr Rivals: nr ESPN: nr
Note: In many cases, Scout, Rivals, 247Sports, On3, and ESPN may conflict in their listings of height and weight.; In these cases, the average was taken. ESPN grades are on a 100-point scale.; Sources: "ESPN". ESPN.; "2025 Team Ranking". Rivals.

=== 2026 recruiting class ===
College recruiting information (2026)
Name	Hometown	School	Height	Weight	Commit date
JRob Croy; SF	Riverside, CA	Polytechnic High School	6 ft 5 in (1.96 m)	190 lb (86 kg)	Sep 2, 2025
JRob Croy; SF	Recruit ratings: Rivals: 247Sports: ESPN: (NR)				
Overall recruit ranking: Scout: nr Rivals: nr ESPN: nr
Note: In many cases, Scout, Rivals, 247Sports, On3, and ESPN may conflict in their listings of height and weight.; In these cases, the average was taken. ESPN grades are on a 100-point scale.; Sources: "ESPN". ESPN.; "2026 Team Ranking". Rivals.

== Roster ==
2025–26 Saint Mary's Gaels men's basketball team
Players
Coaches

Pos.	#	Name	Height	Weight	Year	Previous school	Hometown
G	0	Mikey Lewis	6 ft 3 in (1.91 m)	185 lb (84 kg)	So	Prolific Prep	Oakland, CA
C	1	Harry Wessels	7 ft 1 in (2.16 m)	280 lb (127 kg)	Sr	AIS Centre of Excellence	Boddington, Australia
G	2	Tony Duckett	6 ft 5 in (1.96 m)	185 lb (84 kg)	So	Carlsbad HS; San Diego	Carlsbad, CA
G/F	6	Mantas Juzėnas	6 ft 6 in (1.98 m)	215 lb (98 kg)	Fr	BC Zalgiris Kaunas	Kaunas, Lithuania
G	7	Joshua Dent	6 ft 3 in (1.91 m)	190 lb (86 kg)	So	AIS Centre of Excellence	Wollongong, Australia
G	8	Rory Hawke	6 ft 5 in (1.96 m)	200 lb (91 kg)	RS Fr	AIS Centre of Excellence	Townsville, Australia
G/F	11	Dillan Shaw	6 ft 7 in (2.01 m)	205 lb (93 kg)	Fr	Heritage Christian Academy	Northridge, CA
F	14	Oilver Faubert	6 ft 8 in (2.03 m)	220 lb (100 kg)	RS Fr	Fort Erie International Academy	Fort Erie, ON
G	22	Cade Bennett (W)	6 ft 0 in (1.83 m)	175 lb (79 kg)	RS Jr	Campolindo HS	Moraga, CA
F	23	Paulius Murauskas	6 ft 8 in (2.03 m)	235 lb (107 kg)	Jr	BC Lietkabelis; Arizona	Kaunas, Lithuania
F	24	Kevin Gad (W)	6 ft 6 in (1.98 m)	205 lb (93 kg)	RS Jr	Granada HS	Livermore, CA
F/C	32	Jazz Gardner	7 ft 0 in (2.13 m)	250 lb (113 kg)	Jr	West Ranch HS; Pacific	Pasadena, CA
G	33	Liam Campbell	6 ft 4 in (1.93 m)	205 lb (93 kg)	RS Fr	Owyhee HS	Meridian, ID
F	42	Trent MacLean	6 ft 8 in (2.03 m)	205 lb (93 kg)	Fr	SoCal Academy	Thousand Oaks, CA
C	45	Andrew McKeever	7 ft 1 in (2.16 m)	275 lb (125 kg)	So	Granada HS	Livermore, CA

Head coach

- Randy Bennett (UC San Diego)

Assistant coach(es)

- Mickey McConnell (Saint Mary's)
- Joe Rahon (Saint Mary's)
- E. J. Rowland (Saint Mary's)
- Dan Sheets (Saint Mary's)
- Trey Touchet (McNeese State)

Legend

- (C) Team captain
- (S) Suspended
- (I) Ineligible
- (W) Walk-on
- Injured
- Current redshirt

Roster

== Schedule and results ==
Date time, TV	Rank^{#}	Opponent^{#}	Result	Record	High points	High rebounds	High assists	Site (attendance) city, state
Exhibition
October 18, 2025*; 2:00 p.m., ESPN+		at No. 13 Arizona	L 68–81		14 – Dent	10 – McKeever	3 – Lewis	McKale Center (13,328); Tucson, AZ
October 26, 2025*; 9:30 a.m.		at Ole Miss	W 68–53		8 – Gad	9 – McKeever	8 – Dent	SJB Pavilion; Oxford, MS
Non-conference regular season
November 3, 2025*; 7:00 p.m., ESPN+		St. Thomas (MN)	W 84–58	1–0	23 – Lewis	10 – McKeever	6 – Dent	University Credit Union Pavilion (3,327); Moraga, CA
November 7, 2025*; 7:30 p.m., ESPN+		Chattanooga	W 87–66	2–0	28 – Lewis	8 – Tied	6 – Dent	University Credit Union Pavilion (3,381); Moraga, CA
November 11, 2025*; 7:00 p.m., ESPN+		Ohio	W 90–60	3–0	20 – Campbell	10 – McKeever	5 – Tied	University Credit Union Pavilion (3,012); Moraga, CA
November 14, 2025*; 7:00 p.m., ESPN+		North Texas	W 80–49	4–0	23 – Lewis	11 – Murauskas	7 – Dent	University Credit Union Pavilion (3,392); Moraga, CA
November 19, 2025*; 7:00 p.m., ESPN+		Arkansas State	W 85–72	5–0	24 – Murauskas	17 – McKeever	7 – Dent	University Credit Union Pavilion (3,087); Moraga, CA
November 22, 2025*; 7:00 p.m., ESPN+		UC Merced	W 96–42	6–0	24 – Dent	10 – McKeever	6 – Lewis	University Credit Union Pavilion (3,002); Moraga, CA
November 26, 2025*; 4:30 p.m., ESPN2		vs. Wichita State; Battle 4 Atlantis quarterfinal	W 70–65	7–0	20 – Marauskas	15 – McKeever	3 – Lewis	Imperial Arena (640); Nassau, Bahamas
November 27, 2025*; 11:30 a.m., ESPN		vs. Virginia Tech; Battle 4 Atlantis semifinal	W 77–66	8–0	19 – Murauskas	8 – McKeever	6 – Dent	Imperial Arena (258); Nassau, Bahamas
November 28, 2025*; 10:00 a.m., ESPN2		vs. No. 24 Vanderbilt; Battle 4 Atlantis championship	L 71–96	8–1	24 – Murauskas	7 – McKeever	3 – Tied	Imperial Arena (890); Nassau, Bahamas
December 7, 2025*; 11:00 a.m., ESPN+		at Davidson	W 70–61	9–1	21 – Dent	13 – McKeever	5 – Dent	John M. Belk Arena (2,692); Davidson, NC
December 14, 2025*; 3:00 p.m.		vs. Boise State	L 67–68	9–2	21 – Murauskas	11 – Murauskas	6 – Dent	Mountain America Center; Idaho Falls, ID
December 19, 2025*; 7:00 p.m., ESPN+		Florida Atlantic	W 88–75	10–2	24 – Dent	11 – McKeever	6 – Dent	University Credit Union Pavilion (3,129); Moraga, CA
December 22, 2025*; 7:00 p.m., ESPN+		Northern Iowa	W 63–58	11–2	20 – Murauskas	9 – Shaw	3 – Tied	University Credit Union Pavilion (3,500); Moraga, CA
WCC regular season
December 28, 2025; 4:00 p.m., ESPN+		at LMU	W 78–73	12–2 (1–0)	18 – Shaw	9 – Murauskas	5 – Dent	Gersten Pavilion (1,546); Los Angeles, CA
December 30, 2025; 6:00 p.m., ESPN+		at Pepperdine	W 72–45	13–2 (2–0)	19 – Murauskas	10 – McKeever	3 – Tied	Firestone Fieldhouse (816); Moraga, CA
January 2, 2026; 7:00 p.m., ESPN+		Portland	W 78–57	14–2 (3–0)	24 – Murauskas	7 – Murauskas	7 – Dent	University Credit Union Pavilion (3,372); Moraga, CA
January 4, 2026; 5:00 p.m., ESPN+		Seattle	W 93–76	15–2 (4–0)	30 – Murauskas	15 – Murauskas	9 – Dent	University Credit Union Pavilion (3,410); Moraga, CA
January 10, 2026; 2:00 p.m., CBSSN		Washington State	W 88–82	16–2 (5–0)	26 – Dent	11 – McKeever	6 – Tied	University Credit Union Pavilion (3,500); Moraga, CA
January 13, 2026; 8:00 p.m., ESPN2		at San Francisco	W 82–68	17–2 (6–0)	21 – Murauskas	17 – McKeever	7 – Dent	Sobrato Center (2,784); San Francisco, CA
January 17, 2026; 4:00 p.m., ESPN+		at Santa Clara	L 54–62	17–3 (6–1)	12 – Murauskas	10 – Murauskas	3 – Dent	Leavey Center (2,700); Santa Clara, CA
January 21, 2026; 8:00 p.m., CBSSN		Oregon State	W 81–51	18–3 (7–1)	16 – Dent	8 – Tied	11 – Dent	University Credit Union Pavilion (3,390); Moraga, CA
January 24, 2026; 5:00 p.m., ESPN+		at Portland	W 75–69	19–3 (8–1)	24 – Murauskas	10 – Wessels	7 – Dent	Chiles Center (1,679); Portland, OR
January 31, 2026; 7:30 p.m., ESPN		at No. 6 Gonzaga; Rivalry	L 65–73	19–4 (8–2)	16 – Dent	8 – McKeever	3 – Dent	McCarthey Athletic Center (6,000); Spokane, WA
February 4, 2026; 7:00 p.m., ESPN+		at San Diego	W 87–60	20–4 (9–2)	14 – Shaw	10 – Shaw	6 – Dent	Jenny Craig Pavilion (3,387); San Diego, CA
February 7, 2026; 8:30 p.m., ESPN2		San Francisco	W 79–54	21–4 (10–2)	20 – Muraskas	14 – McKeever	11 – Dent	University Credit Union Pavilion (3,500); Moraga, CA
February 11, 2026; 7:00 p.m., ESPN+		Pepperdine	W 88–60	22–4 (11–2)	18 – Murauskas	11 – Wessels	11 – Dent	University Credit Union Pavilion (3,405); Moraga, CA
February 14, 2026; 7:30 p.m., ESPN2		at Pacific	W 72–61	23–4 (12–2)	32 – Murauskas	15 – Murauskas	8 – Dent	Alex G. Spanos Center (2,090); Stockton, CA
February 18, 2026; 6:00 p.m., CBSSN		at Seattle	W 72–70	24–4 (13–2)	22 – Lewis	9 – Murauskas	5 – Dent	Climate Pledge Arena (2,507); Seattle, WA
February 21, 2026; 7:00 p.m., ESPN2		at Washington State	W 83–67	25–4 (14–2)	22 – Dent	12 – Murauskas	4 – Murauskas	Beasley Coliseum (4,230); Pullman, WA
February 25, 2026; 8:00 p.m., CBSSN		Santa Clara	W 86–67	26–4 (15–2)	21 – Lewis	14 – Shaw	8 – Dent	University Credit Union Pavilion (3,500); Moraga, CA
February 28, 2026; 7:30 p.m., ESPN		No. 9 Gonzaga; Rivalry	W 70–59	27–4 (16–2)	31 – Lewis	10 – Shaw	4 – Tied	University Credit Union Pavilion (3,500); Moraga, CA
WCC tournament
March 9, 2026; 8:30 p.m., ESPN2	(2) No. 21	vs. (3) Santa Clara; Semifinal	L 71–76	27–5	26 – Murauskas	11 – McKeever	7 – Dent	Orleans Arena (6,343); Paradise, NV
NCAA tournament
March 19, 2026*; 4:35 p.m., truTV	(7 S) No. 22	vs. (10 S) Texas A&M; First round	L 50–63	27–6	18 – Dent	8 – McKeever	4 – Tied	Paycom Center (13,815); Oklahoma City, OK
*Non-conference game. ^{#}Rankings from AP poll. (#) Tournament seedings in parentheses. S=South. All times are in Pacific Time.

== Rankings ==
Ranking movements Legend: ██ Increase in ranking ██ Decrease in ranking — = Not ranked RV = Received votes
	Week																				
Poll	Pre	1	2	3	4	5	6	7	8	9	10	11	12	13	14	15	16	17	18	19	Final
AP	RV	—	RV	RV	RV	RV	RV	—	—*	RV	RV	RV	RV	—	RV	RV	RV	21	21	22	RV
Coaches	RV	RV	RV	RV	RV	RV	RV	RV	RV	RV	RV	RV	RV	RV	RV	RV	RV	21	21	22	RV

*AP did not release a week 8 poll.
