= Adam Miller (basketball) =

American basketball player (born 2002)

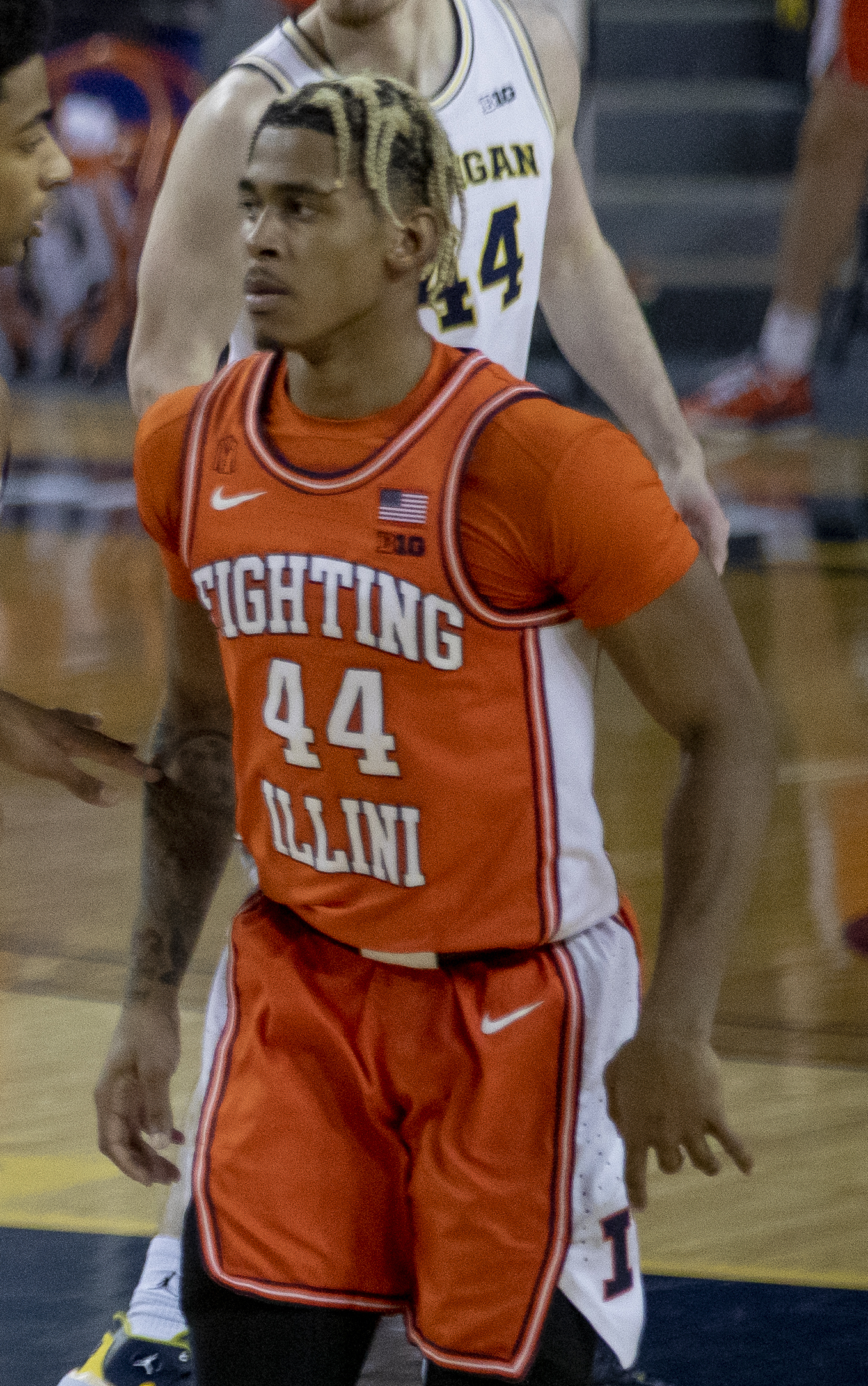
- Miller with Illinois in 2021

No. 44 – Oostende
- Position: Point guard / shooting guard
- League: BNXT League

Personal information
- Born: January 23, 2002 (age 24) Peoria, Illinois, U.S.
- Listed height: 6 ft 3 in (1.91 m)
- Listed weight: 200 lb (91 kg)

Career information
- High school: Manual (Peoria, Illinois); Morgan Park (Chicago, Illinois)
- College: Illinois (2020–2021); LSU (2022–2023); Arizona State (2023–2025); Gonzaga (2025–2026)
- NBA draft: 2026: undrafted

Career history
- 2026–present: BC Oostende

Career highlights
- Illinois Mr. Basketball (2020); Nike Hoop Summit (2020)
Medals
Men's basketball
Representing the United States
FIBA U19 World Cup
Gold medal – first place	2021 Latvia	Team

Adam Miller Jr. (born January 23, 2002) is an American professional basketball player for Coretec Oostende of the BNXT League. He played college basketball for the Illinois Fighting Illini, LSU Tigers, Arizona State Sun Devils and Gonzaga Bulldogs.

== High school career ==
In his freshman season, Miller played basketball for Manual High School in Peoria, Illinois. For his final three years of high school, he transferred to Morgan Park High School in Chicago due to his mother getting a new teaching job in the area. As a sophomore, Miller averaged 15 points per game, helping his team win the Class 3A state title. In his junior season, he averaged 29 points, 7.3 rebounds and 5.4 assists per game and was named Illinois Gatorade Player of the Year. As a senior, Miller averaged 27.4 points, 6.3 rebounds, 5.6 assists and 2.3 steals per game, leading Morgan Park to the Class 3A sectional final. He was named Illinois Mr. Basketball and repeated as Illinois Gatorade Player of the Year.

=== Recruiting ===
On November 21, 2019, Miller announced his commitment to play college basketball for Illinois over offers from Arizona and Louisville, among others.

College recruiting
Name	Hometown	School	Height	Weight	Commit date
Adam Miller; SG	Peoria, IL	Morgan Park (IL)	6 ft 3 in (1.91 m)	170 lb (77 kg)	Nov 21, 2019
Adam Miller; SG	Recruit ratings: Rivals: 247Sports: ESPN: (89)				
Overall recruit ranking: Rivals: 34 247Sports: 35 ESPN: 30
Note: In many cases, Scout, Rivals, 247Sports, On3, and ESPN may conflict in their listings of height and weight.; In these cases, the average was taken. ESPN grades are on a 100-point scale.; Sources: "Illinois 2020 Basketball Commitments". Rivals.; "2020 Illinois Fighting Illini Recruiting Class". ESPN.; "2020 Team Ranking". Rivals.

== College career ==
In his freshman debut on November 25, 2020, Miller scored a season-high 28 points, shooting 10-of-12 from the field and 6-of-8 from three-point range, in a 122–60 win over North Carolina A&T. He set the program record for points by a freshman in their debut. As a freshman, Miller averaged 8.3 points and 2.8 rebounds per game.

After the season, he transferred to LSU over offers from Kentucky and Michigan, among others. On October 20, 2021, it was announced that Miller had torn his ACL and would miss the season. Miller returned from injury and started for LSU the following season.

After the 22-23 season ended, Miller transferred again, this time to Arizona State University. Due to transferring a second time without a degree, Miller required a waiver from the NCAA to play the 23-24 season. The NCAA denied Miller's waiver and thus deemed him ineligible to play. Because of this, Miller appeared due to miss the season, however the transfer eligibility rule was put on hold for the rest of the season, allowing Miller to participate.

Following two seasons at Arizona State, Miller transferred to Gonzaga.

== Professional career ==
On August 20, 2026, he signed with Coretec Oostende of the BNXT League.

== National team career ==
Miller represented the United States at the 2021 FIBA Under-19 World Cup in Latvia. He averaged 7.4 points and 3.6 assists per game, helping his team win the gold medal.

== Career statistics ==
Legend
GP	Games played	GS	Games started	MPG	Minutes per game
FG%	Field goal percentage	3P%	3-point field goal percentage	FT%	Free throw percentage
RPG	Rebounds per game	APG	Assists per game	SPG	Steals per game
BPG	Blocks per game	PPG	Points per game	**Bold**	Career high

=== College ===
Year	Team	GP	GS	MPG	FG%	3P%	FT%	RPG	APG	SPG	BPG	PPG
2020–21	Illinois	31	31	25.5	.391	.340	.684	2.8	.8	.6	.0	8.3
2021–22	LSU	Redshirt										
2022–23	LSU	33	**33**	**33.0**	.336	.316	**.829**	2.3	1.7	.8	**.2**	11.5
2023–24	Arizona State	23	21	31.4	.393	.303	.818	**3.2**	1.6	.8	.1	**12.0**
2024–25	Arizona State	30	30	29.7	**.449**	**.429**	.756	2.3	**1.9**	**1.0**	.0	9.8
2025–26	Gonzaga	**35**	25	19.4	.425	.302	.750	1.6	1.0	.7	.0	7.3
Career		152	140	27.5	.392	.336	.784	2.3	1.4	.8	.1	9.6
