= Paulius Murauskas =

Lithuanian college basketball player (born 2004)

No. 23 – Arizona State Sun Devils
- Position: Power forward
- Conference: Big 12 Conference

Personal information
- Born: 14 February 2004 (age 22) Kaunas, Lithuania
- Listed height: 6 ft 8 in (2.03 m)
- Listed weight: 235 lb (107 kg)

Career information
- College: Arizona (2023–2024); Saint Mary's (2024–2026); Arizona State (2026–present)
- Playing career: 2019–2023

Career history
- 2019–2021: BC Žalgiris-2
- 2020–2021: BC Žalgiris
- 2021–2022: BC Nevėžis
- 2022–2023: BC Lietkabelis

Career highlights
- 2× First-team All-WCC (2025, 2026); WCC Newcomer of the Year (2025)

Paulius Murauskas (born 14 February 2004) is a Lithuanian college basketball player for the Arizona State Sun Devils of the Big 12 Conference. He previously played for the Arizona Wildcats and Saint Mary's Gaels.

== Early life ==
Born in Kaunas, Lithuania, Murauskas began his basketball career with BC Žalgiris-2 in 2019, making his Lithuanian Basketball League first-division debut at 16 years old with BC Žalgiris. He played on loan with BC Nevėžis during the 2021–22 season and BC Lietkabelis during the 2022–23 season, averaging 7.2 points per game with Lietkabelis. During the summer of 2023, Murauskas signed to play college basketball in the United States at the University of Arizona.

== College career ==
As a freshman with Arizona, Murauskas appeared in 23 games, averaging 2.7 points and 1.2 rebounds per game, before entering the transfer portal at the conclusion of the season. In April 2024, he transferred to Saint Mary's College of California to play for the Saint Mary's Gaels. Murauskas made an instant impact in his first season for the Gaels, becoming one of the team's leading scorers and rebounders. He finished the season averaging 12.1 points and 7.7 rebounds per game, being named the WCC Newcomer of the Year.

Murauskas averaged 18.4 points, 7.6 rebounds and 2.1 assists, as a junior. He transferred to Arizona State after the season, reuniting with his former coach Randy Bennett.

== Career statistics ==
Legend
GP	Games played	GS	Games started	MPG	Minutes per game
FG%	Field goal percentage	3P%	3-point field goal percentage	FT%	Free throw percentage
RPG	Rebounds per game	APG	Assists per game	SPG	Steals per game
BPG	Blocks per game	PPG	Points per game	**Bold**	Career high

=== College ===
Year	Team	GP	GS	MPG	FG%	3P%	FT%	RPG	APG	SPG	BPG	PPG
2023–24	Arizona	23	0	5.1	.438	.519	.700	1.2	.1	.1	.0	2.7
2024–25	Saint Mary's	35	35	27.0	.447	.292	.743	7.7	1.3	.6	.4	12.1
2025–26	Saint Mary's	33	32	32.2	.482	.333	.840	7.6	2.1	.6	.5	18.4
