= Sunshine Slam =

College basketball competition

- Sport: College basketball
- Founded: 2019
- Founder: Gazelle Group
- No. of teams: 8 (2019–25); 4 (2026)
- Country: United States
- Venues: Ocean Center; Daytona Beach, FL
- Most recent champions: George Mason (Beach); Pacific (Ocean)
- Broadcasters: FloHoops; CBS Sports Network
- Website: Sunshine Slam

The Sunshine Slam is a two-day college basketball tournament featuring eight teams in two separate four-team brackets founded in 2019. The inaugural tournament in 2019 was a round-robin tournament held at Silver Spurs Arena in Kissimmee, FL. The Northeast Conference is the host of the tournament. The tournament relocated to the Ocean Center in Daytona Beach, Florida and has been played there since 2021.

== Brackets ==
^{OT} – Denotes overtime period

=== 2026 ===
November 22
Wyoming
Duquesne

November 24
High Point
Duquesne

November 24
Wyoming
Kent State

=== 2025 ===
==== Campus games ====
November 18
Jacksonville	57
George Mason	79

November 19
Bethune–Cookman	76
Ohio	73

November 20
Pacific	59
Florida Atlantic	82

November 28
Stony Brook	71
Loyola Marymount	68

==== Beach Bracket ====
Semifinals; November 24
George Mason	92
Ohio	69
Florida Atlantic	76
Loyola Marymount	65

Championship; November 25
George Mason	74
Florida Atlantic	65
Consolation Game; November 25
Ohio	58
Loyola Marymount	70

==== Ocean Bracket ====
Semifinals; November 24
Stony Brook	58
Pacific	86
Jacksonville	69
Bethune–Cookman	64

Championship; November 25
Pacific	68
Jacksonville	53
Consolation Game; November 25
Stony Brook	61
Bethune–Cookman	54

=== 2024 ===
The format for the Sunshine Slam will consist of a pair of semifinal round games in each bracket on November 25 and a championship and consolation game in each bracket on November 26. Champions will be crowned for both the Beach and Ocean brackets as well as all-tournament teams. In addition to the neutral site games at the Ocean Center, the Sunshine Slam will feature four on-campus games. Each team from the Beach Bracket will host an Ocean Bracket team prior to the event.

==== Campus games ====
November 16
Chicago State	37
San Francisco	82

November 20
Purdue Fort Wayne	89
Penn State	102

November 21
Radford	51
Clemson	79

November 22
Drexel	73
Fordham	71

==== Beach Bracket ====
Semifinals; November 25
Penn State	85
Fordham	66
Clemson	70
San Francisco	55

Championship; November 26
Penn State	67
Clemson	75
Consolation Game; November 26
Fordham	64
San Francisco	85

==== Ocean Bracket ====
Semifinals; November 25
Radford	63
Chicago State	48
Drexel	81
Purdue Fort Wayne	87

Championship; November 26
Radford	69
Purdue Fort Wayne	56
Consolation Game; November 26
Chicago State	71
Drexel	83

=== 2023 ===
==== Campus games ====
November 11
Siena	48
Richmond	90

November 11
Stetson	55
UNLV	71

November 13
Central Michigan	67
Florida State	94

November 14
Milwaukee	79
No. 25 Colorado	106

==== Beach Bracket ====
Semifinals; November 20
Florida State	83
UNLV	75
No. 18 Colorado	64
Richmond	56

Championship; November 21
Florida State	77^{OT}
No. 18 Colorado	71
Consolation Game; November 21
UNLV	65
Richmond	82

==== Ocean Bracket ====
Semifinals; November 20
Siena	56
Central Michigan	70
Milwaukee	67
Stetson	85

Championship; November 21
Central Michigan	61
Stetson	71
Consolation Game; November 21
Siena	59
Milwaukee	61

=== 2022 ===
==== Campus games ====
November 16
Presbyterian	61
UAB	92

November 17
Austin Peay	62
South Florida	60

November 17
Albany	79
Saint Joseph's	99

November 18
Bucknell	61
Georgia	65

==== Beach Bracket ====
Semifinals; November 21
Georgia	66
Saint Joseph's	53
UAB	80
South Florida	65

Championship; November 22
Georgia	73
UAB	87
Consolation Game; November 22
South Florida	75
Saint Joseph's	62

==== Ocean Bracket ====
Semifinals; November 21
Bucknell	66
Presbyterian	65
Austin Peay	74
Albany	59

Championship; November 22
Austin Peay	65
Bucknell	79
Consolation Game; November 22
Albany	68
Presbyterian	65

=== 2021 ===
Utah, Tulsa, URI, and Boston College were in one pod, while the other pod consisted of Bryant, Holy Cross, Air Force, and Bethune-Cookman. 2021 Format: Eight teams in two separate four-team bracketed tournaments.

==== Campus games ====
November 12
Boston College	85
Holy Cross	55

November 12
Rhode Island	83
Bryant	64

November 13
Tulsa	58
Air Force	59

November 15
Utah	86
Bethune-Cookman	55

==== Beach Bracket ====
Semifinals; November 20
Utah	68
Boston College	61
Rhode Island	71
Tulsa	77

Championship; November 21
Utah	72
Tulsa	58
Consolation Game; November 21
Boston College	65
Rhode Island	71

==== Ocean Bracket ====
Semifinals; November 20
Air Force	72
Holy Cross	53
Bryant	72
Bethune-Cookman	81

Championship; November 21
Air Force	73
Bethune-Cookman	65
Consolation Game; November 21
Holy Cross	62
Bryant	78

=== 2019 ===
November 8
Delaware	56
Oakland	53

November 8
Southern Illinois	72
UTSA	60

November 9
Delaware	65
Southern Illinois	62

November 9
Oakland	75
UTSA	62

November 10
Delaware	91
UTSA	70
