= Mario Saint-Supéry =

Spanish basketball player (born 2006)

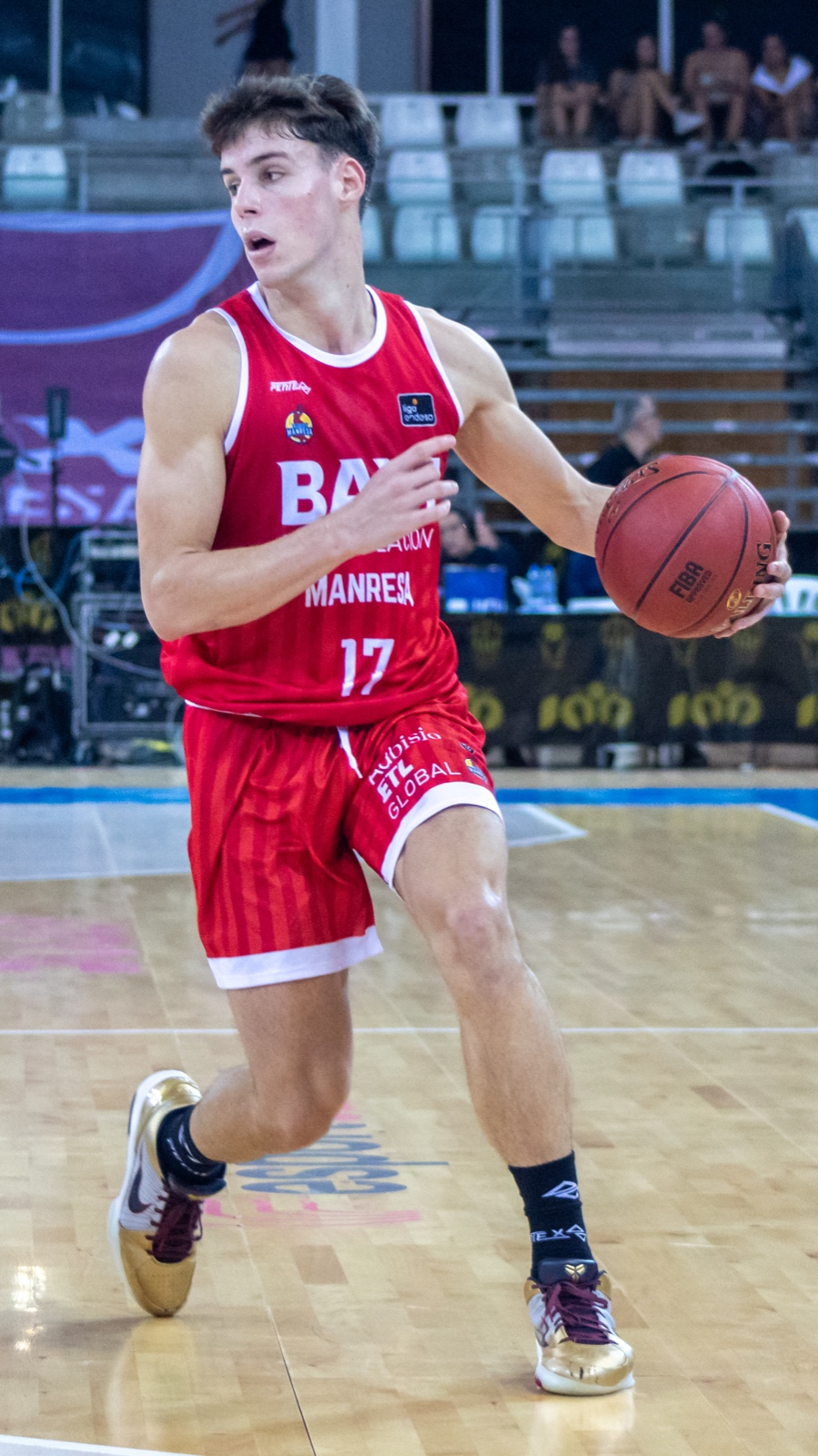
- Saint-Supéry with Manresa in 2024

No. 5 – Valencia Basket
- Position: Point guard
- League: Liga ACB; EuroLeague

Personal information
- Born: 14 April 2006 (age 20) Málaga, Spain
- Listed height: 6 ft 3 in (1.91 m)
- Listed weight: 199 lb (90 kg)

Career information
- College: Gonzaga (2025–2026)
- Playing career: 2022–present

Career history
- 2022–2025: Unicaja Málaga
- 2024: →Tizona
- 2024–2025: →Manresa
- 2026–present: Valencia

Career highlights
- All-Liga ACB Young Players Team (2025); Spanish Cup winner (2023); WCC All-Freshman Team (2026); FIBA U16 EuroBasket MVP (2022)
Medals
Men's basketball
Representing Spain
FIBA U18 EuroBasket
Silver medal – second place	2023 Serbia	Team
FIBA U16 EuroBasket
Silver medal – second place	2022 North Macedonia	Team

Mario Saint-Supéry Fernández (born 14 April 2006) is a Spanish professional basketball player for Valencia Basket of the Liga ACB and the EuroLeague. He played college basketball for the Gonzaga Bulldogs, and represents the Spain national team internationally.

== Life and career ==
Mario Saint-Supéry Fernández was born on 14 April 2006 in Málaga.

He made his debut with the senior team of Unicaja Málaga on 16 March 2022, in a Basketball Champions League fixture against BC Oostende. He was loaned out to CB Tizona in the middle of the 2023–24 season. He subsequently joined Bàsquet Manresa in August 2024, again on loan from Unicaja.

He made his debut with the Spanish senior national team in a EuroBasket 2025 qualification fixture against Slovakia. On 30 June 2025, Saint-Supéry was reported to be joining the Gonzaga Bulldogs for their 2025–26 season. Saint-Supéry made the list for the EuroBasket 2025, covering the vacant slot left by Lorenzo Brown.

In July 2026, Valencia Basket announced the signing of Saint-Supéry in a four-year deal.

== Career statistics ==
Legend
GP	Games played	GS	Games started	MPG	Minutes per game
FG%	Field goal percentage	3P%	3-point field goal percentage	FT%	Free throw percentage
RPG	Rebounds per game	APG	Assists per game	SPG	Steals per game
BPG	Blocks per game	PPG	Points per game	**Bold**	Career high

=== College ===
Year	Team	GP	GS	MPG	FG%	3P%	FT%	RPG	APG	SPG	BPG	PPG
2025–26	Gonzaga	35	17	23.1	.410	.403	.878	2.8	3.8	1.3	.1	8.6
