= 2023–24 Santa Clara Broncos men's basketball team =

American college basketball season

2023–24 Santa Clara Broncos men's basketball
- Conference: West Coast Conference
- Record: 20–13 (10–6 WCC)
- Head coach: Herb Sendek (8th season)
- Assistant coaches: Jason Ludwig; Scott Garson; Ryan Madry
- Home arena: Leavey Center

2023–24 West Coast Conference men's basketball standings
	Conf.				Overall
Team	W		L	PCT	W		L	PCT
No. 21 Saint Mary's †	15	–	1	.938	26	–	8	.765
No. 15 Gonzaga	14	–	2	.875	27	–	8	.771
San Francisco	11	–	5	.688	23	–	11	.676
Santa Clara	10	–	6	.625	20	–	13	.606
San Diego	7	–	9	.438	18	–	15	.545
Portland	5	–	11	.313	12	–	21	.364
Loyola Marymount	5	–	11	.313	12	–	19	.387
Pepperdine	5	–	11	.313	13	–	20	.394
Pacific	0	–	16	.000	6	–	26	.188
† 2024 WCC tournament winner Rankings from AP Poll

The 2023–24 Santa Clara Broncos men's basketball team represented Santa Clara University during the 2023–24 NCAA Division I men's basketball season. The Broncos, led by eighth-year head coach Herb Sendek, played their home games at the Leavey Center as members of the West Coast Conference. They finished the season 20–13, 10–6 in WCC play to finish in fourth place. As the No. 4 seed in the WCC Tournament, they defeated San Diego in the quarterfinals, before losing to Saint Mary's in the semifinals.

== Previous season ==
The Broncos finished the 2022–23 season 23–10, 11–5 in WCC play to finish in third place. They lost in the quarterfinals of the WCC tournament to San Francisco. They received an invitation to the National Invitation Tournament, where they lost in the first round to Sam Houston.

== Offseason ==
=== Departures ===
Name	Number	Pos.	Height	Weight	Year	Hometown	Reason for departure
Carlos Stewart	1	G	6'1"	185	Sophomore	Baton Rouge, LA	Transferred to LSU
Giordan Williams	4	G	6'3"	191	Senior	Long Beach, CA	Graduate transferred to Montana
Jaden Bediako	12	C	6'10"	245	Senior	Brampton, ON	Graduate transferred to Seton Hall
Keshawn Justice	14	F	6'7"	225	RS Senior	Madison, WI	Graduated
Jacob Holt	15	F	6'9"	235	Sophomore	Ladner, BC	Transferred to Sacramento State
Brandin Podziemski	22	G	6'5"	205	Sophomore	Muskego, WI	Declare for 2023 NBA draft; selected 19th overall by Golden State Warriors
Parker Braun	23	F	6'10"	215	RS Senior	Overland Park, KS	Graduate transferred to Kansas

=== Incoming transfers ===
Name	Number	Pos.	Height	Weight	Year	Hometown	Previous School
Tyeree Bryan	1	G	6'6"	202	Junior	Orlando, FL	Charleston Southern
Adama Bal	4	G	6'7"	190	Junior	Le Mans, France	Arizona
Francisco Cáffaro	10	C	7'1"	254	GS Senior	Santa Fe, Argentina	Virginia
Johnny O'Neil	14	F	6'9"	200	Junior	Miami Shores, FL	American
Jalen Benjamin	15	G	5'10"	160	GS Senior	Raleigh, NC	Mount St. Mary's

=== Recruiting ===
College recruiting
Name	Hometown	School	Height	Weight	Commit date
Luke McEldon; C	Ashburn, VA	Cushing Academy	6 ft 10 in (2.08 m)	260 lb (120 kg)	Sep 19, 2022
Luke McEldon; C	Recruit ratings: Scout: Rivals: 247Sports: (0)				
Bukky Oboye; C	Sugar Land, TX	Clements High School	7 ft 0 in (2.13 m)	210 lb (95 kg)	Jun 1, 2022
Bukky Oboye; C	Recruit ratings: Scout: Rivals: 247Sports: (0)				
Christian Hammond; PG	Glendale, AZ	Dream City Christian	6 ft 3 in (1.91 m)	180 lb (82 kg)	Oct 1, 2022
Christian Hammond; PG	Recruit ratings: Scout: Rivals: 247Sports: (0)				
Overall recruit ranking: Scout: nr Rivals: nr ESPN: nr
Note: In many cases, Scout, Rivals, 247Sports, On3, and ESPN may conflict in their listings of height and weight.; In these cases, the average was taken. ESPN grades are on a 100-point scale.; Sources: "Santa Clara 2023 Basketball Commitments". Rivals.; "2023 Santa Clara Basketball Commits". Scout.; "ESPN". ESPN.; "Scout.com Team Recruiting Rankings". Scout.; "2023 Team Ranking". Rivals.

=== Recruiting class of 2024 ===
College recruiting (2024)
Name	Hometown	School	Height	Weight	Commit date
Allen Graves; PF	Ponchatoula, LA	Ponchatoula High School	6 ft 8 in (2.03 m)	N/A	Jun 27, 2023
Allen Graves; PF	Recruit ratings: Scout: Rivals: 247Sports: (0)				
Overall recruit ranking: Scout: nr Rivals: nr ESPN: nr
Note: In many cases, Scout, Rivals, 247Sports, On3, and ESPN may conflict in their listings of height and weight.; In these cases, the average was taken. ESPN grades are on a 100-point scale.; Sources: "Santa Clara 2024 Basketball Commitments". Rivals.; "2024 Santa Clara Basketball Commits". Scout.; "ESPN". ESPN.; "Scout.com Team Recruiting Rankings". Scout.; "2024 Team Ranking". Rivals.

== Roster ==
2023–24 Santa Clara Broncos men's basketball team
Players
Coaches

Pos.	#	Name	Height	Weight	Year	Previous school	Hometown
G	0	Brenton Knapper	6 ft 0 in (1.83 m)	170 lb (77 kg)	RS So	Colony HS	Ontario, CA
G	1	Tyeree Bryan	6 ft 6 in (1.98 m)	202 lb (92 kg)	Jr	Olympia HS; Charleston Southern	Orlando, FL
G	2	Christian Hammond	6 ft 3 in (1.91 m)	180 lb (82 kg)	Fr	Dream City Christian (AZ)	Denver, CO
G	3	Kosy Akametu	6 ft 5 in (1.96 m)	210 lb (95 kg)	RS Fr	King Drew HS	Carson, CA
G	4	Adama Bal	6 ft 7 in (2.01 m)	190 lb (86 kg)	Jr	INSEP Paris; Arizona	Le Mans, France
C	10	Francisco Cáffaro	7 ft 1 in (2.16 m)	242 lb (110 kg)	GS	NBA Global Academy; Virginia	Santa Fe, Argentina
C	12	Bukky Oboye	7 ft 0 in (2.13 m)	200 lb (91 kg)	Fr	Clements HS	Sugarland, TX
C	13	Christoph Tilly	7 ft 0 in (2.13 m)	225 lb (102 kg)	So	Alba Berlin	Berlin, Germany
F	14	Johnny O'Neil	6 ft 10 in (2.08 m)	200 lb (91 kg)	Jr	Chaminade-Madonna Prep; American	Miami Shores, FL
G	15	Jalen Benjamin	5 ft 10 in (1.78 m)	160 lb (73 kg)	Sr	Meadowcreek HS; Mount St. Mary's	Raleigh, NC
F	20	Luke McEldon	6 ft 9 in (2.06 m)	225 lb (102 kg)	Fr	Cushing Academy	London, England
F	21	Camaron Tongue	6 ft 7 in (2.01 m)	220 lb (100 kg)	Jr	Rivers School	Medfield, MA
G	22	Carlos Marshall Jr. (W)	6 ft 6 in (1.98 m)	205 lb (93 kg)	RS Sr	Southwind HS; Tennessee State	Memphis, TN
G	31	Malachi Douyon (W)	6 ft 3 in (1.91 m)	180 lb (82 kg)	So	Pacific Collegiate Charter School	Santa Cruz, CA
G	44	Jacob Ensminger	6 ft 9 in (2.06 m)	205 lb (93 kg)	RS Fr	Ratiopharm Ulm	Ulm, Germany
G	50	Bradan Yarusso (W)	6 ft 1 in (1.85 m)	160 lb (73 kg)	So	St. Francis HS	Lombard, IL

Head coach

- Herb Sendek (Carnegie Mellon)

Assistant coach(es)

- Jason Ludwig (UCLA)
- Scott Garson (UC Santa Barbara)
- Ryan Madry (West Georgia)

Legend

- (C) Team captain
- (S) Suspended
- (I) Ineligible
- (W) Walk-on
- Injured
- Current redshirt

Roster

== Schedule and results ==
Date time, TV	Rank^{#}	Opponent^{#}	Result	Record	High points	High rebounds	High assists	Site (attendance) city, state
Non-conference regular season
November 8, 2023*; 7:00 p.m., ESPN+		Utah Tech	W 77–69	1–0	22 – Marshall Jr.	9 – O'Neil	3 – Tied	Leavey Center (1,628); Santa Clara, CA
November 11, 2023*; 4:00 p.m., ESPN+		Saint Francis (PA)	W 82–59	2–0	25 – Marshall Jr.	8 – Tongue	4 – Bal	Leavey Center (1,245); Santa Clara, CA
November 15, 2023*; 6:00 p.m., P12N		at Stanford	W 89–79	3–0	23 – Bal	8 – O’Neil	4 – Caffaro	Maples Pavilion (2,649); Stanford, CA
November 18, 2023*; 5:00 p.m., ESPN+		Southeastern Louisiana; Emerald Coast Classic campus site game	W 65–63	4–0	20 – Tilly	10 – Marshall Jr.	5 – Tilly	Leavey Center (1,198); Santa Clara, CA
November 20, 2023*; 7:00 p.m., ESPN+		Mississippi Valley State	W 81–39	5–0	14 – Marshall Jr.	12 – Marshall Jr.	4 – Tied	Leavey Center (1,037); Santa Clara, CA
November 24, 2023*; 6:30 p.m., CBSSN		vs. Oregon; Emerald Coast Classic semifinals	W 88–82	6–0	25 – Bal	7 – Tied	4 – Tied	The Arena at NFSC (2,196); Niceville, FL
November 25, 2023*; 4:00 p.m., CBSSN		vs. Ohio State; Emerald Coast Classic championship	L 56–86	6–1	13 – Bal	8 – Marshall Jr.	2 – Tied	The Arena at NFSC (2,196); Niceville, FL
November 29, 2023*; 7:00 p.m., ESPN+		Menlo	W 106–69	7–1	16 – Benjamin	7 – Tied	4 – Tied	Leavey Center (1,131); Santa Clara, CA
December 2, 2023*; 4:00 p.m., P12N		at California	L 69–84	7–2	22 – Bal	8 – Tied	4 – Tied	Haas Pavilion (3,356); Berkeley, CA
December 9, 2023*; 3:00 p.m., −		vs. New Mexico; Jack Jones Classic	L 76–93	7–3	16 – Tongue	5 – Akametu	5 – Bal	Dollar Loan Center (−); Henderson, NV
December 13, 2023*; 7:00 p.m., ESPN+		Utah State	L 82–84	7–4	18 – Bal	7 – O'Neil	5 – Caffaro	Leavey Center (1,107); Santa Clara, CA
December 16, 2023*; 11:00 a.m., P12N		vs. Washington State; Jerry Colangelo Classic	W 69–61	8–4	23 – Bal	10 – O'Neil	2 – Tied	Footprint Center (−); Phoenix, AZ
December 20, 2023*; 7:00 p.m., NBCSBA		at San Jose State	L 78–81	8–5	29 – Marshall Jr.	5 – Tied	6 – Marshall Jr.	Provident Credit Union Event Center (2,135); San Jose, CA
December 23, 2023*; 2:00 p.m., FloSports		vs. Duquesne	W 81–73	9–5	19 – Tied	6 – Marshall Jr.	2 – Tied	Orleans Arena (−); Paradise, NV
December 30, 2023*; 4:00 p.m., ESPN+		Yale	L 58–66	9–6	17 – Bryan	9 – Bryan	5 – Bal	Leavey Center (1,751); Santa Clara, CA
WCC regular season
January 4, 2024; 8:00 p.m., ESPN+		at Loyola Marymount	W 68–57	10–6 (1–0)	21 – Bal	7 – Tied	3 – Tied	Gersten Pavilion (958); Los Angeles, CA
January 6, 2024; 7:00 p.m., ESPN+		at Pepperdine	W 78–72	11–6 (2–0)	28 – Bal	9 – Knapper	2 – Tilly	Firestone Fieldhouse (1,653); Malibu, CA
January 11, 2024; 6:30 p.m., ESPN		No. 23 Gonzaga	W 77–76	12–6 (3–0)	17 – Bal	8 – Bryan	6 – Bal	Leavey Center (4,200); Santa Clara, CA
January 13, 2024; 4:00 p.m., ESPN+		Saint Mary's	L 49–73	12–7 (3–1)	11 – Tilly	5 – Caffaro	3 – McEldon	Leavey Center (4,200); Santa Clara, CA
January 18, 2024; 7:00 p.m., ESPN+		at Pacific	W 88–69	13–7 (4–1)	23 – O'Neil	7 – Tied	4 – Tied	Alex G. Spanos Center (1,881); Stockton, CA
January 20, 2024; 4:00 p.m., ESPN+		Portland	W 101–86	14–7 (5–1)	22 – Tilly	8 – Tilly	9 – Bal	Leavey Center (2,036); Santa Clara, CA
January 25, 2024; 7:00 p.m., ESPN+		Pepperdine	W 94–71	15–7 (6–1)	23 – Bal	7 – Tied	6 – Tilly	Leavey Center (1,686); Santa Clara, CA
January 31, 2024; 8:00 p.m., ESPNU		at Saint Mary's	L 77–82	15–8 (6–2)	23 – Marshall Jr.	9 – O'Neil	3 – Ensminger	University Credit Union Pavilion (3,411); Moraga, CA
February 3, 2024; 4:00 p.m., ESPN+		San Diego	L 59–70	15–9 (6–3)	21 – O'Neil	12 – O'Neil	6 – Ensminger	Leavey Center (2,351); Santa Clara, CA
February 10, 2024; 7:00 p.m., ESPN+		at San Francisco	L 70–71	15–10 (6–4)	12 – O'Neil	11 – Ensminger	4 – Ensminger	War Memorial Gymnasium (3,208); San Francisco, CA
February 15, 2024; 7:00 p.m., ESPN+		Pacific	W 79–53	16–10 (7–4)	17 – Ensminger	10 – Tied	6 – Ensminger	Leavey Center (1,330); Santa Clara, CA
February 17, 2024; 7:00 p.m., ESPN+		at San Diego	W 82–69	17–10 (8–4)	23 – Benjamin	10 – Tied	6 – Benjamin	Jenny Craig Pavilion (2,371); San Diego, CA
February 22, 2024; 8:00 p.m., CBSSN		Loyola Marymount	W 65–55	18–10 (9–4)	15 – Tied	9 – O'Neil	4 – Tied	Leavey Center (2,385); Santa Clara, CA
February 24, 2024; 7:00 p.m., ESPN2		at Gonzaga	L 81–94	18–11 (9–5)	18 – Tilly	8 – Tilly	4 – Knapper	McCarthey Athletic Center (6,000); Spokane, WA
February 29, 2024; 6:00 p.m., ESPN+		at Portland	L 75–80 ^{OT}	18–12 (9–6)	22 – Bal	8 – Bryan	3 – Tied	Chiles Center (1,089); Portland, OR
March 2, 2024; 4:00 p.m., ESPN+		San Francisco	W 69–62	19–12 (10–6)	16 – Tied	8 – Marshall Jr.	2 – Tied	Leavey Center (3,000); Santa Clara, CA
WCC tournament
March 9, 2024; 7:00 p.m., ESPN2	(4)	vs. (5) San Diego; Quarterfinals	W 104–79	20–12	24 – Bal	9 – Bryan	6 – Benjamin	Orleans Arena (2,637); Paradise, NV
March 11, 2024; 6:00 p.m., ESPN	(4)	vs. (1) No. 21 Saint Mary's; Semifinals	L 65–79	20–13	26 – Marshall Jr.	5 – Marshall Jr.	3 – Tied	Orleans Arena (4,885); Paradise, NV
*Non-conference game. ^{#}Rankings from AP Poll. (#) Tournament seedings in parentheses. All times are in Pacific Time.
