= 2023–24 San Diego Toreros men's basketball team =

Men's basketball team

2023–24 San Diego Toreros men's basketball
- Conference: West Coast Conference
- Record: 18–15 (7–9 WCC)
- Head coach: Steve Lavin (2nd season)
- Assistant coaches: John Moore (2nd season); Tyus Edney (2nd season); Patrick Sandle (2nd season)
- Home arena: Jenny Craig Pavilion

2023–24 West Coast Conference men's basketball standings
	Conf.				Overall
Team	W		L	PCT	W		L	PCT
No. 21 Saint Mary's †	15	–	1	.938	26	–	8	.765
No. 15 Gonzaga	14	–	2	.875	27	–	8	.771
San Francisco	11	–	5	.688	23	–	11	.676
Santa Clara	10	–	6	.625	20	–	13	.606
San Diego	7	–	9	.438	18	–	15	.545
Portland	5	–	11	.313	12	–	21	.364
Loyola Marymount	5	–	11	.313	12	–	19	.387
Pepperdine	5	–	11	.313	13	–	20	.394
Pacific	0	–	16	.000	6	–	26	.188
† 2024 WCC tournament winner Rankings from AP Poll

The 2023–24 San Diego Toreros men's basketball team represented the University of San Diego during the 2023–24 NCAA Division I men's basketball season. The Toreros were led by second-year head coach Steve Lavin. They played their home games at the Jenny Craig Pavilion in San Diego, California, as members of the West Coast Conference (WCC). They finished the season 18–15, 7–9 in WCC play, to finish in fifth place. As the No. 5 seed in the WCC Tournament, they defeated Pepperdine in the second round, before losing to Santa Clara in the quarterfinals.

== Previous season ==
The Toreros finished the 2022–23 season 11–20, 4–12 in WCC play, to finish in ninth place. They lost in the first round of the WCC tournament to Portland.

== Offseason ==
=== Departures ===
Name	Number	Pos.	Height	Weight	Year	Hometown	Reason for departure
Jaiden Delaire	0	F	6'9"	215	GS Senior	North Granby, CT	Graduated
Jase Townsend	1	G	6'3"	195	RS Senior	Dallas, TX	Graduated
Elliyas Delaire	2	G	6'2"	175	Sophomore	North Granby, CT	Walk-on; not on team roster
Marcellus Earlington	10	F	6'7"	230	RS Senior	Stony Point, NY	Graduated
Yavuz Gultekin	11	F	6'7"	200	Senior	Karşıyaka, Turkey	Graduated
Seikou Sisoho Jawara	12	G	6'3"	210	Junior	Mataró, Spain	Play professional overseas
Jeremiah Nyarko	20	F	6'9"	205	Freshman	Accra, Ghana	Transferred to Western Texas College
Nic Lynch	44	C	6'11"	260	GS Senior	Seattle, WA	Graduated
Eric Williams Jr.	50	G	6'7"	195	RS Senior	Port Huron, MI	Graduated

=== Incoming transfers ===
Name	Num	Pos.	Height	Weight	Year	Hometown	Previous school
PJ Hayes	21	F	6'6"	215	Senior	Waconia, MN	Black Hills State

=== 2023 recruiting class ===
College recruiting information
Name	Hometown	School	Height	Weight	Commit date
Jimmy Oladokun; PF	Rancho Cucamonga, CA	Sierra Canyon School	6 ft 9 in (2.06 m)	200 lb (91 kg)	Nov 16, 2022
Jimmy Oladokun; PF	Recruit ratings: Scout: Rivals: 247Sports: (0)				
Kevin Patton Jr. PF	Temecula, CA	Rancho Christian School	6 ft 6 in (1.98 m)	190 lb (86 kg)	Feb 5, 2023
Kevin Patton Jr. PF	Recruit ratings: Scout: Rivals: 247Sports: (0)				
Dragos Lungu; PG	Romania	NBA Global Academy	6 ft 5 in (1.96 m)	N/A	Feb 9, 2023
Dragos Lungu; PG	Recruit ratings: Scout: Rivals: 247Sports: (0)				
Keyon Kensie; SF	Woodland Hills, CA	Taft High School	6 ft 7 in (2.01 m)	180 lb (82 kg)	Feb 26, 2023
Keyon Kensie; SF	Recruit ratings: Scout: Rivals: 247Sports: (0)				
Santiago Trouet; PF	Argentina	N/A	6 ft 10 in (2.08 m)	N/A	Feb 14, 2023
Santiago Trouet; PF	Recruit ratings: Scout: Rivals: 247Sports: (0)				
David Jordan; C	Windsor, ON	Royal Crown Academic School	6 ft 11 in (2.11 m)	195 lb (88 kg)	Apr 28, 2023
David Jordan; C	Recruit ratings: Scout: Rivals: 247Sports: (0)				
Overall recruit ranking: Scout: nr Rivals: nr ESPN: nr
Note: In many cases, Scout, Rivals, 247Sports, On3, and ESPN may conflict in their listings of height and weight.; In these cases, the average was taken. ESPN grades are on a 100-point scale.; Sources: "San Diego Toreros 2023 Basketball Commitments". Rivals.; "2023 San Diego Toreros Basketball Commits". Scout.; "ESPN 2023 San Diego Toreros Basketball recruits". ESPN.; "Scout.com Team Recruiting Rankings". Scout.; "2023 Team Ranking". Rivals.

=== 2024 recruiting class ===
College recruiting information (2024)
Name	Hometown	School	Height	Weight	Commit date
Chas Lewless; PG	Detroit, MI	Martin Luther King High School	6 ft 3 in (1.91 m)	170 lb (77 kg)	
Chas Lewless; PG	Recruit ratings: Scout: Rivals: 247Sports: (0)				
Gavin Ripp; PF	San Jose, CA	Archbishop Mitty High School	6 ft 7 in (2.01 m)	N/A	Jul 1, 2023
Gavin Ripp; PF	Recruit ratings: Scout: Rivals: 247Sports: (0)				
Overall recruit ranking: Scout: nr Rivals: nr ESPN: nr
Note: In many cases, Scout, Rivals, 247Sports, On3, and ESPN may conflict in their listings of height and weight.; In these cases, the average was taken. ESPN grades are on a 100-point scale.; Sources: "San Diego Toreros 2024 Basketball Commitments". Rivals.; "2024 San Diego Toreros Basketball Commits". Scout.; "ESPN 2024 San Diego Toreros Basketball recruits". ESPN.; "Scout.com Team Recruiting Rankings". Scout.; "2024 Team Ranking". Rivals.

== Roster ==
2023–24 San Diego Toreros men's basketball team
Players
Coaches

Pos.	#	Name	Height	Weight	Year	Previous school	Hometown
G	0	Kevin Patton Jr.	6 ft 8 in (2.03 m)	197 lb (89 kg)	Fr	Rancho Christian School	Temecula, CA
F	1	Santiago Trouet	6 ft 10 in (2.08 m)	218 lb (99 kg)	Fr		Buenos Aires, Argentina
G	3	Wayne McKinney III	6 ft 0 in (1.83 m)	190 lb (86 kg)	Jr	Coronado HS	Coronado, CA
G	4	Deuce Turner	6 ft 2 in (1.88 m)	185 lb (84 kg)	Jr	Malvern Prep; South Plains College	Coatesville, PA
F	5	Bendji Pierre	6 ft 8 in (2.03 m)	230 lb (104 kg)	Jr	The Patrick School; Indian River State College	Irvington, NJ
G	7	Dragos Lungu	6 ft 6 in (1.98 m)	189 lb (86 kg)	Fr	NBA Global Academy	Cluj-Napoca, Romania
G	8	Kollen Murphy (W)	6 ft 2 in (1.88 m)	175 lb (79 kg)	Fr	Rancho Christian School	Pomona, CA
G	10	Neel Beniwal (W)	6 ft 5 in (1.96 m)	180 lb (82 kg)	So	The Phelps School	Garnet Valley, PA
G	11	Deven Dahlke (W)	6 ft 2 in (1.88 m)	190 lb (86 kg)	Sr	St. Mary's; Drake	Phoenix, AZ
F	14	David Simon	6 ft 11 in (2.11 m)	190 lb (86 kg)	Fr	Royal Crown School	Windsor, ON
G	15	Josh Hecht (W)	6 ft 2 in (1.88 m)	184 lb (83 kg)	Fr	Santa Monica HS	Santa Monica, CA
G	20	Joey Chammaa (W)	5 ft 11 in (1.8 m)	180 lb (82 kg)	Fr	Southern California Academy	Los Angeles, CA
F	21	PJ Hayes	6 ft 6 in (1.98 m)	215 lb (98 kg)	Sr	Waconia HS; Black Hills State	Waconia, MN
G	22	Emmanuel Callas (W)	6 ft 5 in (1.96 m)	215 lb (98 kg)	So	Campolindo HS	Oakland, CA
F	23	Jimmy Oladokun Jr.	6 ft 9 in (2.06 m)	220 lb (100 kg)	Fr	Sierra Canyon	Los Angeles, CA
C	24	Steven Jamerson II (W)	6 ft 10 in (2.08 m)	210 lb (95 kg)	Jr	Crespi Carmlite HS	Los Angeles, CA
G	33	Dominic Muncey	6 ft 0 in (1.83 m)	175 lb (79 kg)	Jr	Cathedral Catholic HS	San Diego, CA
G	35	Keyon Kensie	6 ft 7 in (2.01 m)	187 lb (85 kg)	Fr	Taft HS	Los Angeles, CA

Head coach

- Steve Lavin (Chapman University)

Assistant coach(es)

- John Moore (Cypress College)
- Tyus Edney (UCLA)
- Patrick Sandle (San Francisco State)

Legend

- (C) Team captain
- (S) Suspended
- (I) Ineligible
- (W) Walk-on
- Injured
- Current redshirt

Roster
Last update: April 6, 2024

== Schedule and results ==
Date time, TV	Rank^{#}	Opponent^{#}	Result	Record	High points	High rebounds	High assists	Site (attendance) city, state
Non-conference regular season
November 6, 2023*; 8:00 p.m., ESPN+		Sonoma State	W 68–64	1–0	16 – McKinney III	8 – Patton Jr.	4 – Lungu	Jenny Craig Pavilion (894); San Diego, CA
November 8, 2023*; 7:00 p.m., ESPN+		Jackson State	W 87–61	2–0	20 – Lungu	10 – tied	5 – McKinney III	Jenny Craig Pavilion (422); San Diego, CA
November 11, 2023*; 7:00 p.m., ESPN+		at UC San Diego	L 63–69	2–1	21 – McKinney III	5 – tied	3 – McKinney III	LionTree Arena (2,038); San Diego, CA
November 17, 2023*; 7:00 p.m., ESPN+		Le Moyne	W 80–71	3–1	19 – Turner	9 – Patton Jr.	5 – Lungu	Jenny Craig Pavilion (437); San Diego, CA
November 20, 2023*; 7:00 p.m., ESPN+		Navy	W 67–59	4–1	16 – McKinney III	7 – Lungu	4 – tied	Jenny Craig Pavilion (622); San Diego, CA
November 24, 2023*; 7:30 p.m., −		vs. Arkansas State; Acrisure Invitational semifinals	W 71–57	5–1	18 – Turner	9 – Trouet	4 – McKinney III	Acrisure Arena (1,682); Thousand Palms, CA
November 25, 2023*; 7:30 p.m., −		vs. Hawaii; Acrisure Invitational championship	L 66–77	5–2	18 – Turner	7 – Kensie	1 – tied	Acrisure Arena (1,293); Thousand Palms, CA
November 29, 2023*; 7:00 p.m., ESPN+		Northern Colorado	W 74–72	6–2	17 – Patton Jr.	4 – Lungu	6 – Lungu	Jenny Craig Pavilion (603); San Diego, CA
December 3, 2023*; 4:00 p.m., P12N		at Stanford	L 64–88	6–3	12 – Turner	5 – tied	3 – tied	Maples Pavilion (2,455); Stanford, CA
December 6, 2023*; 6:00 p.m., MW Network		at Utah State	L 81–108	6–4	17 – Turner	5 – Jamerson II	4 – Patton Jr.	Smith Spectrum (7,078); Logan, UT
December 9, 2023*; 7:30 p.m., CBSSN		Arizona State	W 89–84	7–4	23 – tied	9 – Jamerson II	5 – Turner	Jenny Craig Pavilion (1,102); San Diego, CA
December 15, 2023*; 7:00 p.m., ESPN+		Portland State	W 69–65	8–4	21 – McKinney III	10 – Jamerson II	5 – McKinney III	Jenny Craig Pavilion (857); San Diego, CA
December 21, 2023*; 7:00 p.m., ESPN+		South Dakota	W 69–66	9–4	20 – McKinney III	10 – Jamerson II	4 – tied	Jenny Craig Pavilion (525); San Diego, CA
December 29, 2023*; 7:00 p.m., ESPN+		Fresno State	L 67–71	9–5	25 – Turner	10 – Jamerson II	2 – tied	Jenny Craig Pavilion (1,197); San Diego, CA
December 31, 2023*; 1:00 p.m., ESPN+		Westcliff	W 78–65	10–5	21 – Hayes	10 – Jamerson II	5 – McKinney III	Jenny Craig Pavilion (453); San Diego, CA
WCC regular season
January 4, 2024; 8:00 p.m., CBSSN		Saint Mary's	L 70–81	10–6 (0–1)	34 – Turner	8 – Jamerson II	2 – tied	Jenny Craig Pavilion (1,159); San Diego, CA
January 6, 2024; 6:00 p.m., ESPN+		at No. 24 Gonzaga	L 74–101	10–7 (0–2)	24 – Turner	9 – Jamerson II	6 – Lungu	McCarthey Athletic Center (6,000); Spokane, WA
January 11, 2024; 7:00 p.m., ESPN+		San Francisco	L 63–83	10–8 (0–3)	19 – McKinney III	7 – Hayes	3 – tied	Jenny Craig Pavilion (753); San Diego, CA
January 13, 2024; 7:00 p.m., ESPN+		Pepperdine	L 77–83	10–9 (0–4)	16 – Patton Jr.	7 – tied	5 – Patton Jr.	Jenny Craig Pavilion (631); San Diego, CA
January 20, 2024; 7:00 p.m., ESPN+		Gonzaga	L 63–105	10–10 (0–5)	17 – McKinney III	5 – tied	5 – Patton Jr.	Jenny Craig Pavilion (3,007); San Diego, CA
January 23, 2024; 6:00 p.m., ESPN+		at Portland; Rescheduled from Jan. 18	W 85–81	11–10 (1–5)	33 – Hayes	7 – Jamerson II	4 – tied	Chiles Center (1,009); Portland, OR
January 27, 2024; 5:00 p.m., ESPN+		at Pepperdine	W 69–67	12–10 (2–5)	20 – Jamerson II	12 – Jamerson II	4 – Patton Jr.	Firestone Fieldhouse (821); Malibu, CA
February 1, 2024; 8:00 p.m., CBSSN		at San Francisco	L 79–95	12–11 (2–6)	18 – Jamerson II	10 – Jamerson II	4 – tied	War Memorial Gymnasium (2,248); San Francisco, CA
February 3, 2024; 4:00 p.m., ESPN+		at Santa Clara	W 70–59	13–11 (3–6)	23 – Turner	10 – Jamerson II	3 – Jamerson II	Leavey Center (2,351); Santa Clara, CA
February 7, 2024; 7:00 p.m., ESPN+		Loyola Marymount	W 79–77	14–11 (4–6)	24 – McKinney III	11 – Jamerson II	6 – McKinney III	Jenny Craig Pavilion (1,003); San Diego, CA
February 10, 2024; 7:00 p.m., ESPN+		at Pacific	W 89–84	15–11 (5–6)	31 – McKinney III	14 – Jamerson II	4 – Jamerson II	Alex G. Spanos Center (1,015); Stockton, CA
February 15, 2024; 7:00 p.m., ESPN+		Portland	W 71–66	16–11 (6–6)	17 – Turner	7 – Jamerson II	5 – McKinney III	Jenny Craig Pavilion (976); San Diego, CA
February 17, 2024; 7:00 p.m., ESPN+		Santa Clara	L 69–82	16–12 (6–7)	28 – Turner	7 – Jamerson II	3 – McKinney III	Jenny Craig Pavilion (2,371); San Diego, CA
February 24, 2024; 7:00 p.m., ESPNU		at No. 18 Saint Mary's	L 62–88	16–13 (6–8)	20 – Turner	8 – Jamerson II	4 – Turner	University Credit Union Pavilion (3,500); Moraga, CA
February 29, 2024; 7:00 p.m., ESPN+		at Loyola Marymount	L 62–96	16–14 (6–9)	20 – Oladokun Jr.	6 – Jamerson II	4 – Lungu	Gersten Pavilion (1,113); Los Angeles, CA
March 2, 2024; 7:00 p.m., ESPN+		Pacific	W 81–69	17–14 (7–9)	30 – Turner	13 – Jamerson II	4 – McKinney III	Jenny Craig Pavilion (1,308); San Diego, CA
WCC tournament
March 8, 2024; 6:00 p.m., ESPN+	(5)	vs. (8) Pepperdine; Second round	W 57–52	18–14	15 – Hayes	13 – Jamerson II	4 – McKinney III	Orleans Arena (2,181); Paradise, NV
March 9, 2024; 7:00 p.m., ESPN2	(5)	vs. (4) Santa Clara; Quarterfinals	L 79–104	18–15	19 – Patton Jr.	6 – Kensie	4 – Patton Jr.	Orleans Arena (2,637); Paradise, NV
*Non-conference game. ^{#}Rankings from AP poll. (#) Tournament seedings in parentheses. All times are in Pacific Time.
