= 2023–24 Saint Mary's Gaels men's basketball team =

American college basketball season

2023–24 Saint Mary's Gaels men's basketball

WCC regular season & tournament champions

NCAA tournament, First round
- Conference: West Coast Conference

Ranking
- Coaches: No. 22
- AP: No. 21
- Record: 26–8 (15–1 WCC)
- Head coach: Randy Bennett (23rd season)
- Assistant coaches: Joe Rahon; Justin Joyner; Mickey McConnell
- Home arena: University Credit Union Pavilion (Capacity: 3,500)

2023–24 West Coast Conference men's basketball standings
	Conf.				Overall
Team	W		L	PCT	W		L	PCT
No. 21 Saint Mary's †	15	–	1	.938	26	–	8	.765
No. 15 Gonzaga	14	–	2	.875	27	–	8	.771
San Francisco	11	–	5	.688	23	–	11	.676
Santa Clara	10	–	6	.625	20	–	13	.606
San Diego	7	–	9	.438	18	–	15	.545
Portland	5	–	11	.313	12	–	21	.364
Loyola Marymount	5	–	11	.313	12	–	19	.387
Pepperdine	5	–	11	.313	13	–	20	.394
Pacific	0	–	16	.000	6	–	26	.188
† 2024 WCC tournament winner Rankings from AP Poll

The 2023–24 Saint Mary's Gaels men's basketball team represented Saint Mary's College of California during the 2023–24 NCAA Division I men's basketball season. The team was led by head coach Randy Bennett in his 23rd season at Saint Mary's. The Gaels played their home games at the University Credit Union Pavilion (Note: Formerly known as McKeon Pavilion) in Moraga, California, as members of the West Coast Conference (WCC). They finished the season 26–8, 15–1 in WCC play to win the regular season championship. As the No. 1 seed in the WCC tournament, they defeated Santa Clara in the semifinals and beat Gonzaga in the championship to win the WCC tournament. Therefore, they received an automatic bid to the NCAA tournament, where, as the No. 5 seed in the West region, they were upset in the first round by Grand Canyon.

== Previous season ==
The Gaels finished the 2022–23 season 27–8, 14–2 in WCC play, to win the WCC regular season championship with Gonzaga. In the WCC tournament, they defeated BYU in the semifinals before losing to Gonzaga in the championship. They received an at-large bid to the NCAA tournament as the No. 5 seed in the West region. There they defeated VCU in the first round before losing to national champion UConn in the second round.

== Offseason ==
=== Departures ===
Name	Number	Pos.	Height	Weight	Year	Hometown	Reason for departure
Logan Johnson	0	G	6'2"	177	GS senior	Mountain View, CA	Graduated
Kyle Bowen	14	F	6'8"	222	Senior	Perth, Australia	Graduated
Matt Van Komen	22	C	7'4"	250	RS junior	Pleasant Grove, UT	Transferred to Hawaii Pacific
Leemet Böckler	23	G	6'7"	215	Junior	Tallinn, Estonia	Signed to play professionally

=== 2023 recruiting class ===
College recruiting
Name	Hometown	School	Height	Weight	Commit date
Jordan Ross #21 PG	Pleasant Grove, UT	AZ Compass Prep	6 ft 3 in (1.91 m)	175 lb (79 kg)	Sep 18, 2022
Jordan Ross #21 PG	Recruit ratings: Rivals: 247Sports: ESPN: (80)				
Andrew McKeever; C	Livermore, CA	Granada High School	7 ft 0 in (2.13 m)	250 lb (110 kg)	Mar 11, 2023
Andrew McKeever; C	Recruit ratings: Scout: Rivals: ESPN: (0)				
Jensen Bradtke; PF	Sandringham, Australia	NBA Global Academy	6 ft 10 in (2.08 m)	N/A	Nov 9, 2022
Jensen Bradtke; PF	Recruit ratings: Scout: Rivals: ESPN: (0)				
Overall recruit ranking: Scout: nr Rivals: nr ESPN: nr
Note: In many cases, Scout, Rivals, 247Sports, On3, and ESPN may conflict in their listings of height and weight.; In these cases, the average was taken. ESPN grades are on a 100-point scale.; Sources: "ESPN". ESPN.; "2023 Team Ranking". Rivals.

=== 2024 recruiting class ===
College recruiting (2024)
Name	Hometown	School	Height	Weight	Commit date
Zion Sensley #8 PF	San Francisco, CA	Archbishop Riordan High School	6 ft 8 in (2.03 m)	195 lb (88 kg)	Aug 24, 2023
Zion Sensley #8 PF	Recruit ratings: Rivals: 247Sports: ESPN: (87)				
Overall recruit ranking: Scout: nr Rivals: nr ESPN: nr
Note: In many cases, Scout, Rivals, 247Sports, On3, and ESPN may conflict in their listings of height and weight.; In these cases, the average was taken. ESPN grades are on a 100-point scale.; Sources: "ESPN". ESPN.; "2024 Team Ranking". Rivals.

== Roster ==
2023–24 Saint Mary's Gaels men's basketball team
Players
Coaches

Pos.	#	Name	Height	Weight	Year	Previous school	Hometown
C	1	Harry Wessels	7 ft 1 in (2.16 m)	255 lb (116 kg)	So	AIS Centre of Excellence	Boddington, Australia
G	2	Jordan Ross	6 ft 3 in (1.91 m)	175 lb (79 kg)	Fr	Link Academy	Layton, UT
G	3	Augustas Marčiulionis	6 ft 4 in (1.93 m)	195 lb (88 kg)	Jr	Rytas Vilnius	Vilnius, Lithuania
F	5	Joshua Jefferson	6 ft 8 in (2.03 m)	220 lb (100 kg)	So	Liberty HS	Las Vegas, NV
C	11	Mitchell Saxen	6 ft 10 in (2.08 m)	242 lb (110 kg)	Sr	Ingraham HS	Seattle, WA
G	14	Rory Hawke	6 ft 5 in (1.96 m)	190 lb (86 kg)	RS Fr	AIS Centre of Excellence	Townsville, Australia
G	15	Chris Howell	6 ft 6 in (1.98 m)	195 lb (88 kg)	RS So	Torrey Pines HS	San Diego, CA
G	20	Aidan Mahaney	6 ft 3 in (1.91 m)	180 lb (82 kg)	So	Campolindo HS	Lafayette, CA
G	22	Cade Bennett (W)	6 ft 0 in (1.83 m)	170 lb (77 kg)	RS Fr	Campolindo HS	Moraga, CA
F	24	Kevin Gad (W)	6 ft 6 in (1.98 m)	195 lb (88 kg)	RS Fr	Granada HS	Livermore, CA
F	25	Mason Forbes	6 ft 9 in (2.06 m)	230 lb (104 kg)	RS Sr	Folsom HS; Harvard	Folsom, CA
G/F	33	Luke Barrett	6 ft 6 in (1.98 m)	200 lb (91 kg)	RS Jr	Piedmont HS	Piedmont, CA
G/F	44	Alex Ducas	6 ft 7 in (2.01 m)	220 lb (100 kg)	GS	AIS Centre of Excellence	Geraldton, Australia
C	45	Andrew McKeever	7 ft 1 in (2.16 m)	255 lb (116 kg)	Fr	Granada HS	Livermore, CA
F	50	Jensen Bradtke	6 ft 10 in (2.08 m)	220 lb (100 kg)	Fr	NBA Global Academy	Sandringham, Australia

Head coach

- Randy Bennett (UC San Diego)

Assistant coach(es)

- Justin Joyner (UC Santa Barbara)
- Mickey McConnell (Saint Mary's)
- Joe Rahon (Saint Mary's)

Legend

- (C) Team captain
- (S) Suspended
- (I) Ineligible
- (W) Walk-on
- Injured
- Current redshirt

Roster
Last update: 2024-05-16

== Schedule and results ==
Date time, TV	Rank^{#}	Opponent^{#}	Result	Record	High points	High rebounds	High assists	Site (attendance) city, state
Exhibition
October 20, 2023*; 10:00 p.m., −	No. 23	at Hawaii; Charity Exhibition for Maui Wildfire Relief	W 92–58	−	25 – Mahaney	8 – Barrett	6 – Marčiulionis	Stan Sheriff Center (4,902); Honolulu, HI
Non-conference regular season
November 6, 2023*; 7:00 p.m., ESPN+	No. 23	Stanislaus State	W 107–28	1–0	19 – Forbes	8 – tied	5 – Mahaney	University Credit Union Pavilion (3,318); Moraga, CA
November 9, 2023*; 7:00 p.m., ESPN+	No. 23	New Mexico	W 72–58	2–0	25 – Mahaney	7 – Saxen	5 – Marčiulionis	University Credit Union Pavilion (3,500); Moraga, CA
November 12, 2023*; 5:00 p.m., ESPN+	No. 23	Weber State	L 57–61	2–1	11 – tied	8 – Jefferson	3 – tied	University Credit Union Pavilion (3,389); Moraga, CA
November 17, 2023*; 6:30 p.m., ESPN+		vs. San Diego State; Continental Tire Main Event semifinals	L 54–79	2–2	16 – Saxen	8 – Saxen	4 – Jefferson	T-Mobile Arena (−); Paradise, NV
November 19, 2023*; 4:30 p.m., ESPN+		vs. Xavier; Continental Tire Main Event consolation	L 49–66	2–3	14 – Marčiulionis	14 – Saxen	3 – Marčiulionis	T-Mobile Arena (−); Paradise, NV
November 24, 2023*; 1:00 p.m., ESPN+		Davidson	W 89–55	3–3	23 – Ducas	11 – Saxen	5 – tied	University Credit Union Pavilion (3,411); Moraga, CA
November 27, 2023; 8:00 p.m., ESPNU		Utah	L 71–78	3–4	22 – Mahaney	10 – Saxen	5 – Mahaney	University Credit Union Pavilion (3,500); Moraga, CA
December 1, 2023*; 7:30 p.m., FS1		vs. Boise State	L 60–63	3–5	19 – Mahaney	8 – Saxen	4 – Marčiulionis	Mountain America Center (4,985); Idaho Falls, ID
December 5, 2023*; 7:00 p.m., ESPN+		Cleveland State	W 70–57	4–5	20 – Saxen	8 – tied	5 – Marčiulionis	University Credit Union Pavilion (2,964); Moraga, CA
December 9, 2023*; 3:30 p.m., CBSSN		at No. 13 Colorado State	W 64–61	5–5	18 – Marčiulionis	13 – Jefferson	3 – tied	Moby Arena (8,083); Fort Collins, CO
December 16, 2023*; 4:00 p.m., ESPN+		vs. UNLV; Jerry Colangelo Classic	W 69–67 ^{2OT}	6–5	23 – Saxen	16 – Saxen	3 – tied	Footprint Center (−); Phoenix, AZ
December 19, 2023*; 7:00 p.m., ESPN+		Middle Tennessee	W 71–34	7–5	20 – Wessels	7 – Jefferson	3 – Marčiulionis	University Credit Union Pavilion (2,931); Moraga, CA
December 21, 2023*; 7:00 p.m., ESPN+		Northern Kentucky	W 92–56	8–5	18 – Marčiulionis	13 – Saxen	8 – Marčiulionis	University Credit Union Pavilion (2,877); Moraga, CA
December 23, 2023*; 5:00 p.m., ESPN+		Missouri State	L 64–69	8–6	17 – Marčiulionis	10 – Saxen	5 – Marčiulionis	University Credit Union Pavilion (3,412); Moraga, CA
December 29, 2023*; 5:00 p.m., ESPN+		Kent State	W 66–46	9–6	19 – Barrett	12 – Ducas	7 – Marčiulionis	University Credit Union Pavilion (3,380); Moraga, CA
WCC regular season
January 4, 2024; 8:00 p.m., CBSSN		at San Diego	W 81–70	10–6 (1–0)	25 – Mahaney	7 – Barrett	10 – Marčiulionis	Jenny Craig Pavilion (1,159); San Diego, CA
January 6, 2024; 6:00 p.m., ESPN+		at Loyola Marymount	W 68–64	11–6 (2–0)	22 – Marčiulionis	9 – Jefferson	4 – Ducas	Gersten Pavilion (1,566); Los Angeles, CA
January 11, 2024; 8:00 p.m., ESPNU		Portland	W 95–52	12–6 (3–0)	25 – Mahaney	9 – Ducas	8 – Jefferson	University Credit Union Pavilion (3,373); Moraga, CA
January 13, 2024; 4:00 p.m., ESPN+		at Santa Clara	W 73–49	13–6 (4–0)	18 – Mahaney	8 – Wessels	10 – Marčiulionis	Leavey Center (4,200); Santa Clara, CA
January 20, 2024; 7:00 p.m., CBSSN		at San Francisco	W 77–60	14–6 (5–0)	22 – Mahaney	10 – Jefferson	7 – Marčiulionis	War Memorial Gymnasium (3,432); San Francisco, CA
January 25, 2024; 8:00 p.m., CBSSN		Pacific	W 76–28	15–6 (6–0)	11 – tied	9 – Saxen	4 – Ducas	University Credit Union Pavilion (3,286); Moraga, CA
January 27, 2024; 7:00 p.m., ESPNU		Loyola Marymount	W 70–65	16–6 (7–0)	25 – Marčiulionis	6 – tied	7 – Marčiulionis	University Credit Union Pavilion (3,500); Moraga, CA
January 31, 2024; 8:00 p.m., ESPNU		Santa Clara	W 82–77	17–6 (8–0)	20 – Marčiulionis	6 – tied	6 – Marčiulionis	University Credit Union Pavilion (3,411); Moraga, CA
February 3, 2024; 7:30 p.m., ESPN		at Gonzaga; Rivalry	W 64–62	18–6 (9–0)	20 – Mahaney	11 – Jefferson	4 – tied	McCarthey Athletic Center (6,000); Spokane, WA
February 6, 2024; 8:00 p.m., ESPN2		at Pacific	W 84–43	19–6 (10–0)	18 – Ducas	6 – tied	5 – Marčiulionis	Alex G. Spanos Center (1,911); Stockton, CA
February 10, 2024; 5:30 p.m., ESPN+		at Portland	W 76–51	20–6 (11–0)	19 – Mahaney	7 – Mahaney	8 – Marčiulionis	Chiles Center (2,158); Portland, OR
February 15, 2024; 8:00 p.m., CBSSN	No. 18	Pepperdine	W 103–59	21–6 (12–0)	28 – Marčiulionis	7 – tied	6 – Marčiulionis	University Credit Union Pavilion (3,500); Moraga, CA
February 20, 2024; 8:00 p.m., ESPN2	No. 18	San Francisco	W 70–66	22–6 (13–0)	20 – Saxen	13 – Saxen	4 – Marčiulionis	University Credit Union Pavilion (3,500); Moraga, CA
February 24, 2024; 7:00 p.m., ESPNU	No. 18	San Diego	W 88–62	23–6 (14–0)	20 – Saxen	12 – Ducas	10 – Marčiulionis	University Credit Union Pavilion (3,500); Moraga, CA
February 29, 2024; 8:00 p.m., CBSSN	No. 17	at Pepperdine	W 83–57	24–6 (15–0)	17 – Marčiulionis	10 – Ducas	11 – Marčiulionis	Firestone Fieldhouse (1,057); Malibu, CA
March 2, 2024; 7:00 p.m., ESPN	No. 17	No. 23 Gonzaga; Rivalry	L 57–70	24–7 (15–1)	16 – Mahaney	7 – Ducas	5 – Marčiulionis	University Credit Union Pavilion (3,500); Moraga, CA
WCC tournament
March 11, 2024; 6:00 p.m., ESPN	(1) No. 21	vs. (4) Santa Clara; Semifinals	W 79–65	25–7	21 – Ducas	8 – tied	6 – Marčiulionis	Orleans Arena (4,885); Paradise, NV
March 12, 2024; 6:00 p.m., ESPN	(1) No. 21	vs. (2) No. 17 Gonzaga; Championship	W 69–60	26–7	23 – Mahaney	15 – Saxen	8 – Marčiulionis	Orleans Arena (5,794); Paradise, NV
NCAA tournament
March 22, 2024; 7:05 p.m., TruTV	(5 W) No. 15	vs. (12 W) Grand Canyon; First round	L 66–75	26–8	14 – Saxen	11 – Saxen	8 – Marčiulionis	Spokane Arena (11,616); Spokane, WA
*Non-conference game. ^{#}Rankings from AP poll. (#) Tournament seedings in parentheses. All times are in Pacific Time.

== Rankings ==
Ranking movements Legend: ██ Increase in ranking ██ Decrease in ranking — = Not ranked RV = Received votes
	Week																				
Poll	Pre	1	2	3	4	5	6	7	8	9	10	11	12	13	14	15	16	17	18	19	Final
AP	23	RV	—	—	—	—	—	—	—	—	—	RV	RV	RV	18	18	17	23	21	15	21
Coaches	23	24	—	—	—	—	—	—	—	—	—	RV	RV	RV	19	18	17	21	20	15	22
