= Josh Newman (basketball) =

American basketball coach

Current position
- Title: Assistant coach
- Team: Western Kentucky
- Conference: C-USA

Biographical details
- Education: Arizona State

Coaching career (HC unless noted)
- 1997–1998: Arkansas–Fort Smith (assistant)
- 1998–2000: McLennan CC (assistant)
- 2000–2002: South Plains (assistant)
- 2002–2005: Nevada (assistant)
- 2005–2018: Arkansas–Fort Smith
- 2018–2021: UT Permian Basin
- 2021–2024: Pacific (assistant)
- 2024: Pacific (interim HC)
- 2024–present: Western Kentucky (assistant)

Head coaching record
- Overall: 277–169 (.621)
- Tournaments: 0–4 (0–4 NCAA Division II)

Accomplishments and honors

Championships
- 4x Heartland Conference tournament (2014, 2016–2018)

Josh Newman is an American basketball coach who is currently an assistant coach for the Western Kentucky University men's basketball team. Newman served as the interim head coach of the Pacific Tigers men's basketball team during the 2024 West Coast Conference men's basketball tournament.

== Coaching career ==
After various stints as an assistant coach, Newman served as the head coach for the University of Arkansas–Fort Smith for twelve years, accumulating a record of 238–121 and leading the Lions to four NCAA Division II Tournament appearances. Newman then served as the head coach at the University of Texas Permian Basin for three seasons, finishing with a 39–42 overall record before resigning.

On March 4, 2024, Newman was named the interim head coach for the Tigers, following the firing of Leonard Perry.

On May 6, 2024, Newman was hired as an assistant coach at Western Kentucky University under Hank Plona.

== Head coaching record ==
=== NCAA DI ===
Record table
Season	Team	Overall	Conference	Standing	Postseason
Pacific (West Coast Conference) (2024)
2023–24	Pacific	0–1	0–0		
Pacific:		0–1 (.000)	0–0 (–)		
Total:		0–1 (.000)			
National champion Postseason invitational champion Conference regular season champion Conference regular season and conference tournament champion Division regular season champion Division regular season and conference tournament champion Conference tournament champion
