= 2023–24 San Francisco Dons men's basketball team =

American college basketball season

2023–24 San Francisco Dons men's basketball
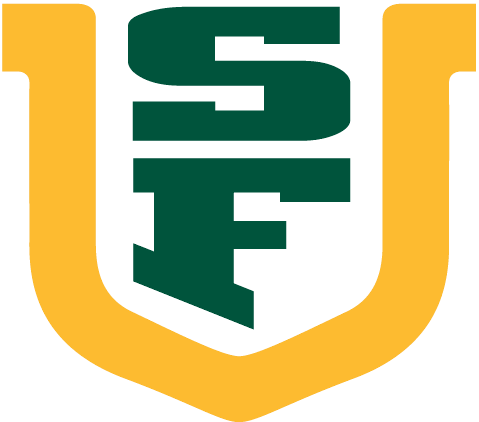

NIT, first round
- Conference: West Coast Conference
- Record: 23–11 (11–5 WCC)
- Head coach: Chris Gerlufsen (2nd season)
- Assistant coaches: Michael Plank; Jay Duncan; Kyle Bankhead
- Home arena: War Memorial Gymnasium (Capacity: 3,005)

2023–24 West Coast Conference men's basketball standings
	Conf.				Overall
Team	W		L	PCT	W		L	PCT
No. 21 Saint Mary's †	15	–	1	.938	26	–	8	.765
No. 15 Gonzaga	14	–	2	.875	27	–	8	.771
San Francisco	11	–	5	.688	23	–	11	.676
Santa Clara	10	–	6	.625	20	–	13	.606
San Diego	7	–	9	.438	18	–	15	.545
Portland	5	–	11	.313	12	–	21	.364
Loyola Marymount	5	–	11	.313	12	–	19	.387
Pepperdine	5	–	11	.313	13	–	20	.394
Pacific	0	–	16	.000	6	–	26	.188
† 2024 WCC tournament winner Rankings from AP Poll

The 2023–24 San Francisco Dons men's basketball team represented the University of San Francisco during the 2023–24 NCAA Division I men's basketball season. The Dons were led by second-year head coach Chris Gerlufsen and played their home games at the War Memorial Gymnasium at the Sobrato Center as members of the West Coast Conference (WCC). They finished the season 23–11, 11–5 in WCC play, to finish in third place. As the No. 3 seed in the WCC tournament, they defeated Portland in the quarterfinals, before losing to Gonzaga in the semifinals. They received an at-large bid to the National Invitation Tournament where they lost in the first round to Cincinnati.

== Previous season ==
The Dons finished the 2022–23 season 20–14, 7–9 in WCC play, to finish in a three-way tie for fifth place. In the WCC tournament as the 6 seed, they defeated Pacific in the second round and Santa Clara in the quarterfinals before losing to Gonzaga in the semifinals. Despite having 20 wins, they were not invited to a postseason tournament.

== Offseason ==
=== Departures ===
Name	Number	Pos.	Height	Weight	Year	Hometown	Reason for departure
Khalil Shabazz	0	G	6'1"	170	RS Senior	Seattle, WA	Graduated
Jamaree Bouyea	1	G	6'2"	180	GS Senior	Seaside, CA	Graduated/undrafted in 2023 NBA draft; signed with the Miami Heat
Julian Rishwain	2	G	6'5"	190	Sophomore	Los Angeles, CA	Transferred to Florida
Toni Rocak	10	F	6'9"	220	RS Senior	Geneva, Switzerland	Graduated
Zane Meeks	15	F	6'9"	215	Junior	Prairie Village, KS	Transferred to Arizona State
Bryce Whitaker	30	G	6'0"	170	Junior	Los Angeles, CA	Walk-on; transferred
Jonas Visser	31	C	6'10"	240	Junior	Amsterdam, Netherlands	Transferred

=== Incoming transfers ===
Name	Number	Pos.	Height	Weight	Year	Hometown	Previous school
Malik Thomas	1	G	6'5"	205	Junior	Fontana, CA	USC
Mike Sharavjamts	5	G/F	6'8"	180	Sophomore	Ulaanbaatar, Mongolia	Dayton
Stefan Todorović	7	F	6'8"	190	Junior	Belgrade, Serbia	SMU
Jonathan Mogbo	10	F	6'8"	225	Senior	West Palm Beach, FL	Missouri State
Robby Beasley III	13	G	6'3"	190	Junior	San Ramon, CA	UC Davis

=== 2023 recruiting class ===
College recruiting information
Name	Hometown	School	Height	Weight	Commit date
Ryan Beasley; PG	San Ramon, CA	Dougherty Valley	5 ft 11 in (1.80 m)	170 lb (77 kg)	Oct 2, 2022
Ryan Beasley; PG	Recruit ratings: Scout: Rivals: 247Sports: (NR)				
Junjie Wang; PF	China	NBA Global Academy	6 ft 9 in (2.06 m)	N/A	Apr 14, 2023
Junjie Wang; PF	Recruit ratings: Scout: Rivals: (NR)				
Overall recruit ranking: Scout: NR Rivals: NR ESPN: NR
Note: In many cases, Scout, Rivals, 247Sports, On3, and ESPN may conflict in their listings of height and weight.; In these cases, the average was taken. ESPN grades are on a 100-point scale.; Sources: "San Francisco Dons 2023 Basketball Commitments". Rivals.; "2023 San Francisco Dons Basketball Commits". Scout.; "ESPN". ESPN.; "Scout.com Team Recruiting Rankings". Scout.; "2023 Team Ranking". Rivals.

== Roster ==
2023–24 San Francisco Dons men's basketball team
Players
Coaches

Pos.	#	Name	Height	Weight	Year	Previous school	Hometown
G	0	Ryan Beasley	5 ft 11 in (1.8 m)	170 lb (77 kg)	Fr	Dougherty Valley HS	San Ramon, CA
G	1	Malik Thomas	6 ft 5 in (1.96 m)	205 lb (93 kg)	Jr	USC	Fontana, CA
C	2	Saba Gigiberia	7 ft 1 in (2.16 m)	248 lb (112 kg)	Jr	Georgia Tech	Tbilisi, Georgia
F	3	Isaiah Hawthorne	6 ft 8 in (2.03 m)	205 lb (93 kg)	RS Jr	Tracy HS	Tracy, CA
G/F	5	Mike Sharavjamts	6 ft 8 in (2.03 m)	180 lb (82 kg)	So	Dayton	Ulaanbaatar, Mongolia
F	7	Stefan Todorović	6 ft 8 in (2.03 m)	190 lb (86 kg)	Jr	SMU	Belgrade, Serbia
F	10	Jonathan Mogbo	6 ft 8 in (2.03 m)	225 lb (102 kg)	Jr	Missouri	West Palm Beach, FL
F	11	Josh Kunen	6 ft 8 in (2.03 m)	210 lb (95 kg)	Sr	Centre of Excellence	Melbourne, Australia
G	12	Justin Bieker (W)	6 ft 5 in (1.96 m)	180 lb (82 kg)	RS Jr	Jesuit HS	Portland, OR
G	13	Robby III Beasley	6 ft 3 in (1.91 m)	190 lb (86 kg)	Jr	UC Davis	San Ramon, CA
F	21	Ndewedo Newbury	6 ft 7 in (2.01 m)	238 lb (108 kg)	Jr	Loomis Chaffee School	London, England
C	33	Volodymyr Markovetskyy	7 ft 2 in (2.18 m)	270 lb (122 kg)	Sr	Washington State	Truskavets, Ukraine
F	35	Junjie Wang	6 ft 9 in (2.06 m)	—	Fr	NBA Global Academy	China
G	45	Jake Cioe (W)	6 ft 0 in (1.83 m)	175 lb (79 kg)	Jr	Salpointe Catholic HS	Tucson, AZ
G	55	Marcus Williams	6 ft 2 in (1.88 m)	197 lb (89 kg)	Jr	Texas A&M	Dickinson, TX

Head coach

- Chris Gerlufsen (Randolph–Macon)

Assistant coach(es)

- Michael Plank (Willamette)
- Jay Duncan (Northwood)
- Kyle Bankhead (Gonzaga)

Legend

- (C) Team captain
- (S) Suspended
- (I) Ineligible
- (W) Walk-on
- Injured
- Current redshirt

Roster
Last update: September 16, 2024

== Schedule and results ==
Date time, TV	Rank^{#}	Opponent^{#}	Result	Record	High points	High rebounds	High assists	Site (attendance) city, state
Non-conference regular season
November 6, 2023*; 7:00 p.m., ESPN+		Bethesda	W 128–59	1–0	17 – tied	6 – Wang	7 – Sharavjamts	War Memorial Gymnasium (2,008); San Francisco, CA
November 9, 2023*; 7:00 p.m., ESPN+		Saint Francis (PA)	W 84–52	2–0	16 – Mogbo	8 – Mogbo	5 – tied	War Memorial Gymnasium (−); San Francisco, CA
November 12, 2023*; 1:00 pm, MW Network		at Boise State	L 58–63	2–1	13 – Sharavjamts	9 – Mogbo	3 – Sharavjamts	ExtraMile Arena (10,520); Boise, ID
November 17, 2023*; 6:00 p.m., CBSSN		vs. Grand Canyon; Arizona Tip-Off - semifinals	L 72–76	2–2	20 – Williams	6 – Newbury	3 – tied	Desert Diamond Arena (3,214); Glendale, AZ
November 19, 2023*; 1:30 p.m., CBSSN		vs. DePaul; Arizona Tip-Off 3rd-place game	W 70–54	3–2	14 – Mogbo	6 – tied	6 – Sharavjamts	Desert Diamond Arena (2589); Glendale, AZ
November 22, 2023*; 6:00 p.m., ESPN+		Purdue Fort Wayne; Arizona Tip-Off campus-site game	W 76–60	4–2	20 – Beasley	18 – Mogbo	5 – Mogbo	War Memorial Gymnasium (−); San Francisco, CA
November 26, 2023*; 5:30 p.m., CBSSN		vs. Minnesota	W 76–58	5–2	21 – Mogbo	10 – Mogbo	3 – tied	Chase Center (3,682); San Francisco, CA
December 3, 2023*; 12:00 p.m., P12N		at Arizona State	L 61–72	5–3	23 – Mogbo	16 – Mogbo	4 – Kunen	Desert Financial Arena (6,563); Tempe, AZ
December 6, 2023*; 5:00 p.m., SECN+/ESPN+		at Vanderbilt	W 73–60	6–3	18 – Williams	14 – Mogbo	9 – Mogbo	Memorial Gymnasium (5,210); Nashville, TN
December 11, 2023*; 7:00 p.m., ESPN+		New Orleans	W 85–72	7–3	28 – Williams	12 – Mogbo	6 – Mogbo	War Memorial Gymnasium (−); San Francisco, CA
December 13, 2023*; 7:00 p.m., ESPN+		Seattle	W 62–59	8–3	18 – tied	7 – Thomas	2 – Williams	War Memorial Gymnasium (2112); San Francisco, CA
December 16, 2023*; 1:00 p.m., MW Network		vs. Utah State	L 53–54	8–4	14 – Mogbo	9 – Mogbo	8 – Williams	Delta Center (4,352); Salt Lake City, UT
December 20, 2023*; 7:00 p.m., ESPN+		Northern Arizona	W 91–51	9–4	19 – Thomas	9 – Mogbo	6 – Williams	War Memorial Gymnasium (1,582); San Francisco, CA
December 22, 2023*; 5:00 p.m., ESPN+		Fresno State	W 77–57	10–4	22 – Thomas	12 – Mogbo	4 – tied	War Memorial Gymnasium (1,488); San Francisco, CA
December 30, 2023*; 3:00 p.m., ESPN+		Mississippi Valley State	W 92–42	11–4	16 – Mogbo	10 – Mogbo	7 – Williams	War Memorial Gymnasium (1,773); San Francisco, CA
WCC regular season
January 4, 2024; 7:00 p.m., ESPN+		at Pacific	W 92–88 ^{OT}	12–4 (1–0)	30 – Mogbo	18 – Mogbo	7 – Williams	Alex G. Spanos Center (1,429); Stockton, CA
January 11, 2024; 7:00 p.m., ESPN+		at San Diego	W 83–63	13–4 (2–0)	19 – Mogbo	11 – Mogbo	7 – Mogbo	Jenny Craig Pavilion (753); San Diego, CA
January 13, 2024; 7:00 p.m., ESPN+		Portland	W 96–69	14–4 (3–0)	26 – Thomas	14 – Mogbo	5 – Ry. Beasley	War Memorial Gymnasium (2,013); San Francisco, CA
January 18, 2024; 8:00 p.m., CBSSN		Loyola Marymount	W 90–74	15–4 (4–0)	23 – Mogbo	11 – Mogbo	7 – Sharavjamts	War Memorial Gymnasium (1,849); San Francisco, CA
January 20, 2024; 7:00 p.m., CBSSN		Saint Mary's	L 60–77	15–5 (4–1)	17 – Ry. Beasley	6 – Mogbo	3 – Williams	War Memorial Gymnasium (3,432); San Francisco, CA
January 25, 2024; 6:00 p.m., ESPN2		at Gonzaga	L 72–77	15–6 (4–2)	19 – Williams	11 – Mogbo	4 – Mogbo	McCarthey Athletic Center (6,000); Spokane, WA
January 27, 2024; 5:00 p.m., ESPN+		at Portland	W 76–64	16–6 (5–2)	22 – Newbury	12 – Mogbo	8 – Mogbo	Chiles Center (1,394); Portland, OR
February 1, 2024; 8:00 p.m., CBSSN		San Diego	W 95–79	17–6 (6–2)	21 – Mogbo	10 – Mogbo	10 – Williams	War Memorial Gymnasium (2,248); San Francisco, CA
February 3, 2024; 7:00 p.m., ESPN+		Pacific	W 79–73	18–6 (7–2)	20 – Williams	14 – Mogbo	6 – Beasley	War Memorial Gymnasium (3,011); San Francisco, CA
February 8, 2024; 8:00 p.m., ESPNU		at Pepperdine	W 80–74	19–6 (8–2)	19 – Mogbo	8 – Mogbo	3 – Sharavjamts	Firestone Fieldhouse (913); Malibu, CA
February 10, 2024; 7:00 p.m., ESPN+		Santa Clara	W 71–70	20–6 (9–2)	17 – Thomas	7 – Mogbo	2 – Mogbo	War Memorial Gymnasium (3,208); San Francisco, CA
February 17, 2024; 6:00 p.m., ESPN+		at Loyola Marymount	W 82–59	21–6 (10–2)	16 – Newbury	11 – Mogbo	5 – Mogbo	Gersten Pavilion (2,057); Los Angeles, CA
February 20, 2024; 8:00 p.m., ESPN2		at No. 18 Saint Mary's	L 66–70	21–7 (10–3)	26 – Williams	6 – tied	5 – Mogbo	University Credit Union Pavilion (3,500); Moraga, CA
February 24, 2024; 7:00 p.m., ESPN+		Pepperdine	W 92–68	22–7 (11–3)	19 – Newbury	5 – Newbury	8 – Williams	War Memorial Gymnasium (3,284); San Francisco, CA
February 29, 2024; 8:00 p.m., ESPN2		No. 23 Gonzaga	L 68–86	22–8 (11–4)	23 – Thomas	11 – Mogbo	6 – Williams	Chase Center (6,480); San Francisco, CA
March 2, 2024; 4:00 p.m., ESPN+		at Santa Clara	L 62–69	22–9 (11–5)	18 – Ry. Beasley	14 – Mogbo	5 – Mogbo	Leavey Center (3,000); Santa Clara, CA
WCC tournament
March 9, 2024; 9:30 p.m., ESPN2	(3)	vs. (6) Portland; Quarterfinals	W 72–51	23–9	16 – Williams	8 – Mogbo	4 – tied	Orleans Arena; Paradise, NV
March 11, 2024; 8:30 p.m., ESPN2	(3)	vs. (2) No. 17 Gonzaga; Semifinals	L 77–89	23–10	22 – Thomas	9 – Thomas	6 – Williams	Orleans Arena (5,685); Paradise, NV
NIT
March 20, 2024; 6:00 p.m., ESPN+		at (2) Cincinnati; First round - Indiana State Bracket	L 72–73 ^{OT}	23–11	31 – Thomas	10 – Mogbo	7 – tied	Fifth Third Arena (3,899); Cincinnati, OH
*Non-conference game. ^{#}Rankings from AP poll. (#) Tournament seedings in parentheses. All times are in Pacific.
