= 2023–24 Portland Pilots men's basketball team =

American college basketball season

2023–24 Portland Pilots men's basketball
- Conference: West Coast Conference
- Record: 12–21 (5–11 WCC)
- Head coach: Shantay Legans (3rd season)
- Associate head coach: Bobby Suarez
- Assistant coaches: T.J. Lipold; Arturo Ormond
- Home arena: Chiles Center

2023–24 West Coast Conference men's basketball standings
	Conf.				Overall
Team	W		L	PCT	W		L	PCT
No. 21 Saint Mary's †	15	–	1	.938	26	–	8	.765
No. 15 Gonzaga	14	–	2	.875	27	–	8	.771
San Francisco	11	–	5	.688	23	–	11	.676
Santa Clara	10	–	6	.625	20	–	13	.606
San Diego	7	–	9	.438	18	–	15	.545
Portland	5	–	11	.313	12	–	21	.364
Loyola Marymount	5	–	11	.313	12	–	19	.387
Pepperdine	5	–	11	.313	13	–	20	.394
Pacific	0	–	16	.000	6	–	26	.188
† 2024 WCC tournament winner Rankings from AP Poll

The 2023–24 Portland Pilots men's basketball team represented the University of Portland during the 2023–24 NCAA Division I men's basketball season. The Pilots, led by third-year head coach Shantay Legans, played their home games at the Chiles Center as members of the West Coast Conference. They finished the season 12–21, 5–11 in WCC play to finish in a three-way tie for sixth place. As the No. 6 seed in the WCC Tournament, they defeated Loyola Marymount in the second round, before losing to San Francisco in the quarterfinals.

== Previous season ==
The Pilots finished the 2022–23 season 14–19, 5–11 in WCC play to finish in eighth place. They defeated San Diego in the first round of the WCC tournament before losing to Santa Clara in the second round.

== Offseason ==
=== Departures ===
Name	Number	Pos.	Height	Weight	Year	Hometown	Reason for departure
Moses Wood	1	F	6'8"	210	RS Senior	Reno, NV	Graduate transferred to Washington
Alden Applewhite	3	F	6'7"	205	Sophomore	Memphis, TN	Transferred to Murray State
Jack Perry	11	G	6'2"	190	RS Senior	Melbourne, Australia	Graduated
Kristian Sjolund	12	F	6'8"	210	RS Junior	Kongsberg, Norway	Signed to play professionally in Germany with Medi Bayreuth
Chika Nduka	15	G/F	6'6"	225	Sophomore	Seattle, WA	Walk-on; transferred to Montana State
Michael Meadows	25	G	6'2"	175	RS Junior	Hollywood, CA	Transferred to Saint Louis
Joey St. Pierre	44	C	6'10"	255	RS Senior	Spring Grove, IL	Graduated

=== Incoming transfers ===
Name	Number	Pos.	Height	Weight	Year	Hometown	Previous School
Thomas Oosterbroek	1	F	6'7"	235	Junior	Amsterdam, Netherlands	Miami (FL)
Yuto Yamanochi-Williams	3	C	6'10"		Sophomore	Aizuwakamatsu, Japan	Lamar
Alimamy Koroma	14	F/C	6'8"	220	Senior	Freetown, Sierra Leone	Cal Poly
Noah Jordan	21	F	6'7"	215	Senior	Indianapolis, IN	West Virginia State

=== 2023 recruiting class ===
College recruiting information
Name	Hometown	School	Height	Weight	Commit date
Vincent Delano; SG	Chandler, AZ	Compass Prep	6 ft 1 in (1.85 m)	N/A	Sep 15, 2022
Vincent Delano; SG	Recruit ratings: Scout: Rivals: (0)				
Tyler Harris; PF	Richmond, VA	Salesian High School	6 ft 7 in (2.01 m)	180 lb (82 kg)	Jun 15, 2023
Tyler Harris; PF	Recruit ratings: Scout: Rivals: 247Sports: (0)				
Cyprian Hyde; C	Vista, CA	Vista High School	6 ft 11 in (2.11 m)	225 lb (102 kg)	
Cyprian Hyde; C	Recruit ratings: Scout: Rivals: (0)				
Overall recruit ranking: Scout: nr Rivals: nr ESPN: nr
Note: In many cases, Scout, Rivals, 247Sports, On3, and ESPN may conflict in their listings of height and weight.; In these cases, the average was taken. ESPN grades are on a 100-point scale.; Sources: "Portland Pilots 2023 Basketball Commitments". Rivals.; "2023 Portland Pilots Basketball Commits". Scout.; "ESPN 2023 Portland Pilots Basketball recruits". ESPN.; "Scout.com Team Recruiting Rankings". Scout.; "2023 Team Ranking". Rivals.

=== 2024 recruiting class ===
College recruiting information (2024)
Name	Hometown	School	Height	Weight	Commit date
Mikah Ballew; SG	Palmdale, CA	Southern California Academy	6 ft 6 in (1.98 m)	N/A	Sep 15, 2022
Mikah Ballew; SG	Recruit ratings: Scout: Rivals: (0)				
Overall recruit ranking: Scout: nr Rivals: nr ESPN: nr
Note: In many cases, Scout, Rivals, 247Sports, On3, and ESPN may conflict in their listings of height and weight.; In these cases, the average was taken. ESPN grades are on a 100-point scale.; Sources: "Portland Pilots 2024 Basketball Commitments". Rivals.; "2024 Portland Pilots Basketball Commits". Scout.; "ESPN 2024 Portland Pilots Basketball recruits". ESPN.; "Scout.com Team Recruiting Rankings". Scout.; "2024 Team Ranking". Rivals.

== Roster ==
2023–24 Portland Pilots men's basketball team
Players
Coaches

Pos.	#	Name	Height	Weight	Year	Previous school	Hometown
G	0	Vukasin Masic	6 ft 5 in (1.96 m)	205 lb (93 kg)	RS Jr	Hoosac School; Maine	Belgrade, Serbia
F	1	Thomas Oosterbroek	6 ft 7 in (2.01 m)	235 lb (107 kg)	Jr	Brentwood School (CA); Miami (FL)	Amsterdam, Netherlands
G/F	2	Tyler Robertson	6 ft 6 in (1.98 m)	225 lb (102 kg)	GS	Box Hill Sr. Secondary; Eastern Washington	Melbourne, Australia
C	3	Yuto Yamanouchi-Williams	6 ft 10 in (2.08 m)	225 lb (102 kg)	So	Ribét Academy; Lamar	Aizuwakamatsu, Japan
G	4	Juan Sebastian Gorosito	6 ft 1 in (1.85 m)	150 lb (68 kg)	So	Denver Prep Academy	Ceres, Santa Fe, Argentina
G	5	Chris Austin	6 ft 4 in (1.93 m)	210 lb (95 kg)	RS Sr	Maranatha HS; Fordham	Pasadena, CA
F	10	Coleman Lemke (W)	6 ft 8 in (2.03 m)	190 lb (86 kg)	RS So	Faith Lutheran HS	Las Vegas, NV
G	11	Vincent Delano	6 ft 2 in (1.88 m)	170 lb (77 kg)	Fr	Arizona Compass Prep	Phoenix, AZ
G	12	Kelson Gebbers (W)	6 ft 6 in (1.98 m)	220 lb (100 kg)	Fr	Brewster HS	Brewster, WA
G	13	Jude Harris (W)	6 ft 5 in (1.96 m)	190 lb (86 kg)	Fr	Salesian HS	Manhattan Beach, CA
F	14	Alimamy Koroma	6 ft 8 in (2.03 m)	220 lb (100 kg)	GS	Prolific Prep Academy; Cal Poly	Freetown, Sierra Leone
G	15	Tyler Harris	6 ft 8 in (2.03 m)	185 lb (84 kg)	Fr	Granada HS	Hayward, CA
G	20	Drew Stack (W)	6 ft 3 in (1.91 m)	175 lb (79 kg)	RS Fr	Madison HS	Madison, NJ
F	21	Noah Jordan	6 ft 7 in (2.01 m)	215 lb (98 kg)	GS	Indianapolis Metropolitan HS; West Virginia State	Indianapolis, IN
F	22	Cyprian Hyde	6 ft 11 in (2.11 m)	230 lb (104 kg)	Fr	Vista HS	Oceanside, CA
F	23	Vasilije Vučinić	6 ft 11 in (2.11 m)	225 lb (102 kg)	Jr	BKK Radnički	Bijelo Polje, Montenegro
F	24	Bol Dengdit	6 ft 11 in (2.11 m)	200 lb (91 kg)	RS Fr	NBA Global Academy	Melbourne, Australia
G	33	Andrew Younan (W)	6 ft 4 in (1.93 m)	175 lb (79 kg)	RS Fr	Viewpoint School	Westlake Village, CA

Head coach

- Shantay Legans (Fresno State)

Assistant coach(es)

- Bobby Suarez (Florida Gulf Coast)
- T.J. Lipold (Westmont College)
- Arturo Ormond (UTPA)

Legend

- (C) Team captain
- (S) Suspended
- (I) Ineligible
- (W) Walk-on
- Injured
- Current redshirt

Roster

== Schedule and results ==
Date time, TV	Rank^{#}	Opponent^{#}	Result	Record	High points	High rebounds	High assists	Site (attendance) city, state
Non-conference regular season
November 6, 2023*; 7:30 p.m., ESPN+		Long Beach State	W 78–73	1–0	25 – Masic	12 – Harris	4 – Tied	Chiles Center (1,073); Portland, OR
November 8, 2023*; 6:00 p.m., ESPN+		Lewis & Clark	W 89–72	2–0	20 – Harris	12 – Jordan	10 – Robertson	Chiles Center (1,007); Portland, OR
November 12, 2023*; 2:00 p.m., KRCW/ESPN+		UC Riverside	W 76–65	3–0	22 – Harris	12 – Harris	4 – Masic	Chiles Center (1,187); Portland, OR
November 15, 2023*; 6:00 p.m., ESPN+		Tennessee State	L 65–75	3–1	24 – Robertson	7 – Robertson	5 – Robertson	Chiles Center (923); Portland, OR
November 18, 2023*; 7:00 p.m., KRCW		at Nevada	L 83–108	3–2	19 – Harris	7 – Harris	7 – Robertson	Lawlor Events Center (7,254); Reno, NV
November 25, 2023*; 5:00 p.m., ESPN+		Willamette	W 107–84	4–2	23 – Koroma	7 – Harris	6 – Robertson	Chiles Center (821); Portland, OR
November 28, 2023*; 7:00 p.m., ESPN+		at Portland State	L 74–75	4–3	28 – Robertson	12 – Koroma	4 – Robertson	Viking Pavilion (1,483); Portland, OR
December 1, 2023*; 6:00 p.m., ESPN+		Wyoming	W 81–70	5–3	17 – Austin	10 – Harris	5 – Robertson	Chiles Center (1,076); Portland, OR
December 3, 2023*; 1:00 p.m., KRCW/ESPN+		Air Force	L 58–80	5–4	15 – Austin	9 – Harris	5 – Robertson	Chiles Center (1,043); Portland, OR
December 7, 2023*; 5:00 p.m., SLN		at North Dakota State	L 67–78	5–5	15 – Robertson	6 – Masic	5 – Masic	Scheels Center (1,234); Fargo, ND
December 9, 2023*; 11:00 a.m., SLN		at North Dakota	W 83–72	6–5	32 – Masic	7 – Koroma	4 – Masic	Betty Engelstad Sioux Center (1,501); Grand Forks, ND
December 16, 2023*; 6:30 p.m., KPDX/ESPN+		vs. Grand Canyon; Jerry Colangelo Classic	L 63–91	6–6	17 – Robertson	9 – Harris	4 – Austin	Footprint Center (4,509); Phoenix, AZ
December 21, 2023*; 8:30 p.m., ESPN2		at Hawai'i; Diamond Head Classic Quarterfinals	L 56–69	6–7	18 – Masic	7 – Robertson	2 – Dengdit	Stan Sheriff Center (5,290); Honolulu, HI
December 22, 2023*; 10:00 p.m., ESPN2		vs. UMass; Diamond Head Classic Consolation Round	L 78–100	6–8	20 – Harris	5 – Tied	4 – Gorosito	Stan Sheriff Center (4,919); Honolulu, HI
December 24, 2023*; 10:30 a.m., ESPN2		vs. Temple; Diamond Head Classic 7th Place Game	L 54–55	6–9	16 – Tied	8 – Vucinic	6 – Gorosito	Stan Sheriff Center; Honolulu, HI
WCC regular season
January 6, 2024; 5:00 p.m., KRCW/ESPN+		Pacific	W 78–64	7–9 (1–0)	19 – Robertson	10 – Yamanouchi-Williams	8 – Robertson	Chiles Center (1,237); Portland, OR
January 11, 2024; 8:00 p.m., ESPNU		at Saint Mary's	L 52–95	7–10 (1–1)	14 – Yamanouchi-Williams	6 – Harris	6 – Masic	University Credit Union Pavilion (3,373); Moraga, CA
January 13, 2024; 7:00 p.m., ESPN+		at San Francisco	L 69–96	7–11 (1–2)	21 – Masic	8 – Yamanouchi-Williams	3 – Dengdit	War Memorial Gymnasium (2,013); San Francisco, CA
January 20, 2024; 4:00 p.m., ESPN+		at Santa Clara	L 86–101	7–12 (1–3)	34 – Robertson	6 – Yamanouchi-Williams	7 – Gorosito	Leavey Center (2,036); Santa Clara, CA
January 23, 2024; 6:00 p.m., ESPN+		San Diego; Rescheduled from January 18	L 81–85	7–13 (1–4)	17 – Robertson	5 – Dengdit	4 – Tied	Chiles Center (1,009); Portland, OR
January 25, 2024; 7:00 p.m., ESPN+		at Loyola Marymount	L 65–92	7–14 (1–5)	20 – Masic	6 – Yamanouchi-Williams	5 – Masic	Gersten Pavilion (991); Los Angeles, CA
January 27, 2024; 5:00 p.m., ESPN+		San Francisco	L 64–76	7–15 (1–6)	22 – Masic	13 – Dengdit	5 – Robertson	Chiles Center (1,394); Portland, OR
February 1, 2024; 7:00 p.m., ESPN+		at Pacific	W 65–60	8–15 (2–6)	23 – Masic	11 – Dengdit	7 – Gorosito	Alex G. Spanos Center (1,178); Stockton, CA
February 3, 2024; 5:00 p.m., ESPN+		Pepperdine	W 93–89	9–15 (3–6)	24 – Robertson	7 – Tied	6 – Masic	Chiles Center (1,516); Portland, OR
February 7, 2024; 5:00 p.m., CBSSN		at Gonzaga	L 64–96	9–16 (3–7)	13 – Morosito	8 – Dengdit	5 – Masic	McCarthey Athletic Center (6,000); Spokane, WA
February 10, 2024; 5:30 p.m., ESPN+		Saint Mary's	L 51–76	9–17 (3–8)	14 – Tied	7 – Dengdit	2 – Tied	Chiles Center (2,158); Portland, OR
February 15, 2024; 7:00 p.m., ESPN+		at San Diego	L 66–71	9–18 (3–9)	19 – Harris	10 – Tied	5 – Masic	Jenny Craig Pavilion (976); San Diego, CA
February 17, 2024; 7:00 p.m., ESPN+		at Pepperdine	L 70–91	9–19 (3–10)	23 – Robertson	7 – Robertson	3 – Masic	Firestone Fieldhouse (823); Malibu, CA
February 22, 2024; 6:00 p.m., RTNW+/ESPN+		Gonzaga	L 65–86	9–20 (3–11)	18 – Robertson	8 – Robertson	4 – Masic	Chiles Center (3,803); Portland, OR
February 29, 2024; 6:00 p.m., KRCW/ESPN+		Santa Clara	W 80–75 ^{OT}	10–20 (4–11)	32 – Robertson	13 – Dengdit	4 – Gorosito	Chiles Center (1,089); Portland, OR
March 2, 2024; 5:00 p.m., ESPN+		Loyola Marymount	W 70–60	11–20 (5–11)	26 – Gorosito	12 – Dengdit	11 – Robertson	Chiles Center (1,165); Portland, OR
WCC tournament
March 8, 2024; 8:30 p.m., ESPN+	(6)	vs. (7) Loyola Marymount; Second round	W 78–70	12–20	22 – Robertson	8 – Tied	7 – Robertson	Orleans Arena (2,181); Paradise, NV
March 9, 2024; 9:30 p.m., ESPN2	(6)	vs. (3) San Francisco; Quarterfinals	L 51–72	12–21	16 – Robertson	8 – Masic	4 – Masic	Orleans Arena; Paradise, NV
*Non-conference game. ^{#}Rankings from AP Poll. (#) Tournament seedings in parentheses. All times are in Pacific Time.
