= 2023–24 Pacific Tigers men's basketball team =

American college basketball season

2023–24 Pacific Tigers men's basketball
- Conference: West Coast Conference
- Record: 6–26 (0–16 WCC)
- Head coach: Leonard Perry (3rd season)
- Assistant coaches: Josh Newman (3rd season); Justin Brown (3rd season); Jason Levy (1st season)
- Home arena: Alex G. Spanos Center

2023–24 West Coast Conference men's basketball standings
	Conf.				Overall
Team	W		L	PCT	W		L	PCT
No. 21 Saint Mary's †	15	–	1	.938	26	–	8	.765
No. 15 Gonzaga	14	–	2	.875	27	–	8	.771
San Francisco	11	–	5	.688	23	–	11	.676
Santa Clara	10	–	6	.625	20	–	13	.606
San Diego	7	–	9	.438	18	–	15	.545
Portland	5	–	11	.313	12	–	21	.364
Loyola Marymount	5	–	11	.313	12	–	19	.387
Pepperdine	5	–	11	.313	13	–	20	.394
Pacific	0	–	16	.000	6	–	26	.188
† 2024 WCC tournament winner Rankings from AP Poll

The 2023–24 Pacific Tigers men's basketball team represented the University of the Pacific during the 2023–24 NCAA Division I men's basketball season. The Tigers were led by third-year head coach Leonard Perry and played their home games at the Alex G. Spanos Center in Stockton, California as members of the West Coast Conference. They finished the season 6–26, 0–16 in WCC play to finish in ninth place. As the No. 9 seed in the WCC Tournament, they were defeated by Pepperdine in the first round.

== Previous season ==
The Tigers finished the 2022–23 season 15–18, 7–9 in WCC play to finish in seventh place. They defeated Pepperdine in the first round of the WCC tournament before losing to San Francisco in the second round.

== Offseason ==
=== Departures ===
Name	Number	Pos.	Height	Weight	Year	Hometown	Reason for departure
Jordan Ivy-Curry	12	G	6'2"	180	Junior	La Marque, TX	Transferred to UTSA
Sam Freeman	15	C	6'10"	240	RS Junior	Dallas, TX	Transferred to Cal State San Bernardino
Keylan Boone	20	G/F	6'8"	200	Senior	Tulsa, OK	Graduate transferred to UNLV
Luke Avdalovic	21	G	6'5"	190	RS Senior	Folsom, CA	Graduated

=== Incoming transfers ===
Name	Number	Pos.	Height	Weight	Year	Hometown	Previous School
Burke Smith	11	F	6'11"	230	RS Junior	Glen Allen, VA	Boise State

=== 2023 recruiting class ===
There were no incoming recruits for the class of 2023.

== Roster ==
2023–24 Pacific Tigers men's basketball team
Players
Coaches

Pos.	#	Name	Height	Weight	Year	Previous school	Hometown
G/F	0	Greg Outlaw	6 ft 4 in (1.93 m)	175 lb (79 kg)	RS Sr	Rezin Orr Academy HS; Central Connecticut State	Chicago, IL
G	1	Donovan Williams	6 ft 5 in (1.96 m)	200 lb (91 kg)	Sr	North Star HS; Oklahoma State	Rockford, IL
G	2	Jalen Brown	6 ft 3 in (1.91 m)	170 lb (77 kg)	Sr	Jefferson HS; Eastern Arizona CC	Portland, OR
G	3	Tyler Beard	6 ft 2 in (1.88 m)	180 lb (82 kg)	Jr	Hargrave Military Academy; Georgetown	Chicago, IL
G	4	Moe Odum	6 ft 1 in (1.85 m)	160 lb (73 kg)	So	West Oaks Academy	New York, NY
F/C	11	Burke Smith	6 ft 11 in (2.11 m)	232 lb (105 kg)	RS Jr	Trinity Episcopal School	Glen Allen, VA
G/F	13	Cam Denson	6 ft 7 in (2.01 m)	210 lb (95 kg)	Jr	Compton HS; Triton College	Compton, CA
G	14	Greydon Edwards (W)	6 ft 0 in (1.83 m)	170 lb (77 kg)	Jr	Pea Ridge HS	Bentonville, AR
G	25	Nick Blake	6 ft 6 in (1.98 m)	200 lb (91 kg)	Sr	IMG Academy; UNLV	Las Vegas, NV
G/F	33	Judson Martindale	6 ft 7 in (2.01 m)	210 lb (95 kg)	RS Jr	Worcester Academy; Holy Cross	Sudbury, MA
F	34	Makai Richards	6 ft 10 in (2.08 m)	225 lb (102 kg)	RS So	Oak Park HS; Eastern Washington	Oak Park, CA

Head coach

- Leonard Perry (Idaho)

Assistant coach(es)

- Josh Newman (Arizona State)
- Justin Brown (Southwest Baptist)
- Jason Levy (Cal State Northridge)

Legend

- (C) Team captain
- (S) Suspended
- (I) Ineligible
- (W) Walk-on
- Injured
- Current redshirt

Roster

== Schedule and results ==
Date time, TV	Rank^{#}	Opponent^{#}	Result	Record	High points	High rebounds	High assists	Site (attendance) city, state
Non-conference regular season
November 6, 2023*; 7:00 p.m., ESPN+		Sam Houston	L 57–64	0–1	14 – Tied	8 – Richards	7 – Odum	Alex G. Spanos Center (1,266); Stockton, CA
November 10, 2023*; 8:00 p.m., P12N		at California	W 87–79	1–1	23 – Williams	6 – Tied	3 – Tied	Haas Pavilion (3,195); Berkeley, CA
November 15, 2023*; 7:00 p.m., MW Network		at Nevada	L 41–88	1–2	10 – Yildizoglu	4 – Martindale	2 – Odum	Lawlor Events Center (7,131); Reno, NV
November 18, 2023*; 2:00 p.m., ESPN+		Lamar	W 77–76	2–2	15 – Martindale	6 – Denson	8 – Odum	Alex G. Spanos Center (912); Stockton, CA
November 20, 2023*; 8:00 p.m., ESPN+		North Dakota	L 71–73	2–3	19 – Williams	9 – Williams	7 – Odum	Alex G. Spanos Center (799); Stockton, CA
November 24, 2023*; 7:00 p.m., ESPN+		Le Moyne; Pacific Multi-Team Event	W 73–71	3–3	21 – Hallums Jr.	11 – Williams	4 – Odum	Alex G. Spanos Center (696); Stockton, CA
November 26, 2023*; 2:00 p.m., ESPN+		Mississippi Valley State; Pacific Multi-Team Event	W 68–65 ^{OT}	4–3	15 – Hallums Jr.	9 – Denson	10 – Odum	Alex G. Spanos Center (684); Stockton, CA
November 29, 2023*; 7:00 p.m., ESPN+		Cal State Northridge; Pacific Multi-Team Event	L 69–80	4–4	17 – Smith	6 – Tied	4 – Tied	Alex G. Spanos Center (850); Stockton, CA
December 2, 2023*; 2:00 p.m., ESPN+		at Northern Arizona	L 58–78	4–5	21 – Martindale	5 – Beard	2 – Tied	Rolle Activity Center (805); Flagstaff, AZ
December 5, 2023*; 6:00 p.m., ESPN+		at Idaho	L 53–83	4–6	15 – Denson	9 – Denson	3 – Hallums Jr.	ICCU Arena (1,490); Moscow, ID
December 9, 2023*; 4:00 p.m., MW Network		at Fresno State	L 56–89	4–7	14 – Denson	6 – Martindale	3 – Yildizoglu	Save Mart Center (1,109); Fresno, CA
December 16, 2023*; 2:00 p.m., ESPN+		UC Davis	L 61–82	4–8	15 – Odum	4 – Beard	8 – Odum	Alex G. Spanos Center (932); Stockton, CA
December 18, 2023*; 7:00 p.m., ESPN+		Stanislaus State	W 68–46	5–8	14 – Tied	6 – Blake	3 – Odum	Alex G. Spanos Center (736); Stockton, CA
December 20, 2023*; 7:00 p.m., ESPN+		at Cal State Fullerton	L 56–67	5–9	16 – Odum	10 – Denson	4 – Odum	Titan Gym (518); Fullerton, CA
December 30, 2023*; 2:00 p.m., ESPN+		Cal State Maritime	W 80–66	6–9	15 – Hallums Jr.	7 – Hallums Jr.	5 – Odum	Alex G. Spanos Center (819); Stockton, CA
WCC regular season
January 4, 2024; 7:00 p.m., ESPN+		San Francisco	L 88–92 ^{OT}	6–10 (0–1)	25 – Hallums Jr.	9 – Denson	10 – Odum	Alex G. Spanos Center (1,429); Stockton, CA
January 6, 2024; 5:00 p.m., ESPN+		at Portland	L 64–78	6–11 (0–2)	16 – Denson	9 – Williams	3 – Odum	Chiles Center (1,237); Portland, OR
January 11, 2024; 7:00 p.m., ESPN+		at Pepperdine	L 78–93	6–12 (0–3)	13 – Tied	5 – Odum	8 – Odum	Firestone Fieldhouse (602); Malibu, CA
January 13, 2024; 6:00 p.m., ESPN+		at Loyola Marymount	L 64–81	6–13 (0–4)	15 – Denson	5 – Odum	4 – Odum	Gersten Pavilion (1,122); Los Angeles, CA
January 18, 2024; 7:00 p.m., ESPN+		Santa Clara	L 69–88	6–14 (0–5)	21 – Odum	9 – Williams	4 – Odum	Alex G. Spanos Center (1,881); Stockton, CA
January 25, 2024; 8:00 p.m., CBSSN		at Saint Mary's	L 28–76	6–15 (0–6)	7 – Williams	4 – Tied	3 – Yildizoglu	University Credit Union Pavilion (3,286); Moraga, CA
January 27, 2024; 7:00 p.m., ESPN+		Gonzaga	L 73–82	6–16 (0–7)	14 – Williams	5 – Tied	6 – Odum	Alex G. Spanos Center (3,165); Stockton, CA
February 1, 2024; 7:00 p.m., ESPN+		Portland	L 60–65	6–17 (0–8)	19 – Martindale	8 – Richards	6 – Odum	Alex G. Spanos Center (1,178); Stockton, CA
February 3, 2024; 7:00 p.m., ESPN+		at San Francisco	L 73–79	6–18 (0–9)	22 – Denson	5 – Richards	5 – Odum	War Memorial Gymnasium (3,011); San Francisco, CA
February 6, 2024; 8:00 p.m., ESPN2		Saint Mary's	L 43–84	6–19 (0–10)	11 – Tied	4 – Denson	4 – Odum	Alex G. Spanos Center (1,911); Stockton, CA
February 10, 2024; 7:00 p.m., ESPN+		San Diego	L 84–89	6–20 (0–11)	17 – Odum	9 – Denson	7 – Odum	Alex G. Spanos Center (1,015); Stockton, CA
February 15, 2024; 6:00 p.m., ESPN+		at Santa Clara	L 53–79	6–21 (0–12)	16 – Williams	5 – Denson	3 – Odum	Leavey Center (1,330); Santa Clara, CA
February 17, 2024; 6:00 p.m., ESPN+		at Gonzaga	L 76–102	6–22 (0–13)	20 – Blake	4 – Denson	5 – Odum	McCarthey Athletic Center (6,000); Spokane, WA
February 21, 2024; 7:00 p.m., ESPN+		Pepperdine	L 70–89	6–23 (0–14)	23 – Denson	10 – Denson	3 – Tied	Alex G. Spanos Center (1,076); Stockton, CA
February 24, 2024; 7:00 p.m., ESPN+		Loyola Marymount	L 63–86	6–24 (0–15)	15 – Outlaw	7 – Williams	4 – Beard	Alex G. Spanos Center (1,959); Stockton, CA
March 2, 2024; 7:00 p.m., ESPN+		at San Diego	L 69–81	6–25 (0–16)	15 – Williams	10 – Yidizoglu	5 – Tied	Jenny Craig Pavilion (1,308); San Diego, CA
WCC tournament
March 7, 2024; 2:30 p.m., ESPN+	(9)	vs. (8) Pepperdine; First round	L 43–102	6–26	12 – Martindale	5 – Smith	5 – Blake	Orleans Arena (647); Paradise, NV
*Non-conference game. ^{#}Rankings from AP Poll. (#) Tournament seedings in parentheses. All times are in Pacific Time.
