= 2023–24 West Coast Conference men's basketball season =

- League: NCAA Division I
- Sport: Men's basketball
- Teams: 9

Regular season
- Season champions: Saint Mary’s
- Season MVP: Augustas Marčiulionis, Saint Mary's

Tournament

Basketball seasons
- ← 2022–23 2024–25 →

2023–24 West Coast Conference men's basketball standings
	Conf.				Overall
Team	W		L	PCT	W		L	PCT
No. 21 Saint Mary's †	15	–	1	.938	26	–	8	.765
No. 15 Gonzaga	14	–	2	.875	27	–	8	.771
San Francisco	11	–	5	.688	23	–	11	.676
Santa Clara	10	–	6	.625	20	–	13	.606
San Diego	7	–	9	.438	18	–	15	.545
Portland	5	–	11	.313	12	–	21	.364
Loyola Marymount	5	–	11	.313	12	–	19	.387
Pepperdine	5	–	11	.313	13	–	20	.394
Pacific	0	–	16	.000	6	–	26	.188
† 2024 WCC tournament winner Rankings from AP Poll

The 2023–24 West Coast Conference men's basketball season began with practices in September 2023 and will end with the 2024 West Coast Conference men's basketball tournament in March 2024. This will be the 73rd season for WCC men's basketball, and the 35th under its current name of "West Coast Conference". The conference was founded in 1952 as the California Basketball Association, became the West Coast Athletic Conference in 1956, and dropped the word "Athletic" in 1989.

== Head coaches ==
=== Coaches ===
Team	Head coach	Previous job	Years at school	Overall record	WCC record	WCC Tournament record	NCAA Tournaments	Sweet Sixteens
Gonzaga	Mark Few	Gonzaga (asst.)	25	689–135 (.836)	332–34 (.907)	49–5 (.907)	23	12
Loyola Marymount	Stan Johnson	Marquette (asst.)	4	43–39 (.524)	19–24 (.442)	2–3 (.400)	0	0
Pacific	Leonard Perry	Pacific (asst.)	3	22–39 (.361)	10–20 (.333)	1–2 (.333)	0	0
Pepperdine	Lorenzo Romar	Arizona (asst.)	6	105–136 (.436)	24-53 (.312)	5–5 (.500)	7	3
Portland	Shantay Legans	Eastern Washington	3	32–33 (.492)	12–18 (.400)	2–2 (.500)	1	0
Saint Mary's	Randy Bennett	Saint Louis (asst.)	23	507–208 (.709)	256–95 (.729)	27–19 (.587)	9	1
San Diego	Steve Lavin	St. John's	2	11–20 (.355)	4–12 (.250)	0–1 (.000)	8	4
San Francisco	Chris Gerlufsen	San Francisco (asst.)	2	20–14 (.588)	7–9 (.438)	2–1 (.667)	0	0
Santa Clara	Herb Sendek	Arizona State	7	120–94 (.561)	57–50 (.533)	5–7 (.417)	8	1

Notes:

- Year at school includes 2023–24 season.
- Overall and WCC records are from time at current school and are through the beginning of the 2023–24 season.

== Preseason ==
=== Conference realignment ===
On September 10, 2021, BYU was one of four schools (the others being Cincinnati, Houston, and UCF) that accepted invitations to join the Big 12 Conference beginning with the 2023-24 athletic season. Therefore, the WCC dropped to 9 teams for the current season.

=== Preseason poll ===
2023-24 WCC Preseason Men's Basketball Coaches Poll
Rank	Team (First Place Votes)	Points
1.	Saint Mary's (5)	61
2.	Gonzaga (4)	60
3.	San Francisco	45
4.	Loyola Marymount	42
5.	Santa Clara	41
6.	Portland	27
7.	Pepperdine	22
8.	Pacific	16
9.	San Diego	10

=== All-WCC Preseason Men's Basketball team ===
Honor	Recipient
Preseason All-WCC Team	Alex Ducas, Saint Mary's
Preseason All-WCC Team	Graham Ike, Gonzaga
Preseason All-WCC Team	Keli Leaupepe, LMU
Preseason All-WCC Team	Aidan Mahaney, Saint Mary's
Preseason All-WCC Team	Houston Mallette, Pepperdine
Preseason All-WCC Team	Ryan Nembhard, Gonzaga
Preseason All-WCC Team	Jevon Porter, Pepperdine
Preseason All-WCC Team	Tyler Robertson, Portland
Preseason All-WCC Team	Mitchell Saxen, Saint Mary's
Preseason All-WCC Team	Anton Watson, Gonzaga

== Rankings ==
*AP does not release post-NCAA tournament rankings

	Improvement in ranking
	Drop in ranking
RV	Received votes but were not ranked in Top 25
NV	No votes received

		Pre/ Wk 1	Wk 2	Wk 3	Wk 4	Wk 5	Wk 6	Wk 7	Wk 8	Wk 9	Wk 10	Wk 11	Wk 12	Wk 13	Wk 14	Wk 15	Wk 16	Wk 17	Wk 18	Final
Gonzaga	AP	11	11	11	11	7	10	15	13	24	23	RV	RV	RV	RV	RV	RV	23	19	
Gonzaga	C	12	12	10	10	8	13	16	16	25	21	RV	RV	RV	RV	RV	RV	22	18	
Loyola Marymount	AP	NV	NV	NV	NV	NV	NV	NV	NV	NV	NV	NV	NV	NV	NV	NV	NV	NV	NV	
Loyola Marymount	C	NV	NV	NV	NV	NV	NV	NV	NV	NV	NV	NV	NV	NV	NV	NV	NV	NV	NV	
Pacific	AP	NV	NV	NV	NV	NV	NV	NV	NV	NV	NV	NV	NV	NV	NV	NV	NV	NV	NV	
Pacific	C	NV	NV	NV	NV	NV	NV	NV	NV	NV	NV	NV	NV	NV	NV	NV	NV	NV	NV	
Pepperdine	AP	NV	NV	NV	NV	NV	NV	NV	NV	NV	NV	NV	NV	NV	NV	NV	NV	NV	NV	
Pepperdine	C	NV	NV	NV	NV	NV	NV	NV	NV	NV	NV	NV	NV	NV	NV	NV	NV	NV	NV	
Portland	AP	NV	NV	NV	NV	NV	NV	NV	NV	NV	NV	NV	NV	NV	NV	NV	NV	NV	NV	
Portland	C	NV	NV	NV	NV	NV	NV	NV	NV	NV	NV	NV	NV	NV	NV	NV	NV	NV	NV	
Saint Mary's	AP	23	RV	NV	NV	NV	NV	NV	NV	NV	NV	NV	RV	RV	RV	18	18	17	23	
Saint Mary's	C	23	24	NV	NV	NV	NV	NV	NV	NV	NV	NV	NV	RV	RV	19	18	17	21	
San Diego	AP	NV	NV	NV	NV	NV	NV	NV	NV	NV	NV	NV	NV	NV	NV	NV	NV	NV	NV	
San Diego	C	NV	NV	NV	NV	NV	NV	NV	NV	NV	NV	NV	NV	NV	NV	NV	NV	NV	NV	
San Francisco	AP	NV	NV	NV	NV	NV	NV	NV	NV	NV	NV	NV	RV	NV	NV	NV	NV	NV	NV	
San Francisco	C	NV	NV	NV	NV	NV	NV	NV	NV	NV	NV	NV	NV	NV	NV	NV	NV	NV	NV	
Santa Clara	AP	NV	NV	NV	NV	NV	NV	NV	NV	NV	NV	NV	NV	NV	NV	NV	NV	NV	NV	
Santa Clara	C	NV	NV	NV	NV	NV	NV	NV	NV	NV	NV	NV	NV	NV	NV	NV	NV	NV	NV	

== Regular season ==
=== Conference matrix ===
	Gonzaga	Loyola Marymount	Pacific	Pepperdine	Portland	Saint Mary's	San Diego	San Francisco	Santa Clara
vs. Gonzaga	–	0–2	0–2	0–2	0–2	1–1	0–2	0–2	1–1
vs. Loyola Marymount	2–0	–	0-2	1–1	1–1	2–0	1–1	2–0	2–0
vs. Pacific	2–0	2–0	–	2–0	2–0	2–0	2–0	2–0	2–0
vs. Pepperdine	2–0	1–1	0–2	–	1–1	2–0	1–1	2–0	2–0
vs. Portland	2–0	1–1	0–2	1–1	–	2-0	2–0	2–0	1–1
vs. Saint Mary's	1–1	0–2	0–2	0–2	0–2	–	0-2	0–2	0–2
vs. San Diego	2–0	1–1	0–2	1–1	0–2	2–0	–	2–0	1–1
vs. San Francisco	2–0	0–2	0–2	0–2	0–2	2–0	0–2	–	1-1
vs. Santa Clara	1–1	0–2	0–2	0–2	1–1	2–0	1–1	1–1	–
Total	14–2	5–11	0–16	5–11	5–11	15–1	7–9	11–5	10–6

=== Early season tournaments ===
The following table summarizes the multiple-team events (MTE) or early season tournaments in which teams from the West Coast Conference will participate.

Team	Tournament	Dates	Result
Gonzaga	Maui Invitational	November 20–22	5th
Loyola Marymount	Cayman Islands Classic	November 19–21	7th
Pacific	Pacific MTE	November 24–29	–
Pepperdine	Ball Dawgs Classic	November 21–24	–
Portland	Diamond Head Classic	December 21–24	8th
Saint Mary's	Continental Tire Main Event	November 17–19	4th
San Diego	Acrisure Invitational	November 24–25	2nd
San Francisco	Arizona Tip-Off	November 17–19	3rd
Santa Clara	Emerald Coast Classic	November 18–25	2nd

=== WCC Player/Freshman of the Week ===
Throughout the year, the West Coast Conference names a player of the week and a freshman of the week as follows:

Week	Date	Player of the Week	Freshman of the Week
1	November 13, 2023	Carlos Marshall Jr., Santa Clara	Tyler Harris, Portland
2	November 20, 2023	Justice Hill, LMU	Tyler Harris (2), Portland
3	November 27, 2023	Anton Watson, Gonzaga	Ryan Beasley, San Francisco
4	December 4, 2023	Ryan Nembhard, Gonzaga	Braden Huff, Gonzaga
5	December 11, 2023	Dominick Harris, LMU	Nils Cooper, Pepperdine
6	December 18, 2023	Mitchell Saxen, Saint Mary's	Kevin Patton Jr., San Diego
7	December 26, 2023	Malik Thomas, San Francisco	Braden Huff (2), Gonzaga
8	January 2, 2024	Luke Barrett, Saint Mary's	Dragos Lungu, San Diego
9	January 8, 2024	Jonathan Mogbo, San Francisco	Tyler Harris (3), Portland
10	January 15, 2024	Jonathan Mogbo (2), San Francisco	Kevin Patton Jr. (2), San Diego
11	January 24, 2024	Joshua Jefferson, Saint Mary's	Braden Huff (3), Gonzaga
12	January 29, 2024	Graham Ike, Gonzaga	Kevin Patton Jr. (3), San Diego
13	February 5, 2024	Jonathan Mogbo (3), San Francisco	Bol Dengdit, Portland
14	February 12, 2024	Wayne McKinney III, San Diego	Braden Huff (4), Gonzaga
15	February 19, 2024	Ryan Nembhard (2), Gonzaga	Kevin Patton Jr. (4), San Diego
16	February 26, 2024	Michael Ajayi, Pepperdine	Ryan Beasley (2), San Francisco
17	March 4, 2024	Graham Ike (2), Gonzaga	Ryan Beasley (3), San Francisco

== Postseason ==
=== WCC Tournament ===
First round Thursday, March 7
8	Pepperdine	102
9	Pacific	43

Second round Friday, March 8
6	Portland	78
7	Loyola Marymount	70
5	San Diego	57
8	Pepperdine	52

Third round Saturday, March 9
3	San Francisco	72
6	Portland	51
4	Santa Clara	104
5	San Diego	79

Semifinals; Monday, March 11
2	Gonzaga	89
3	San Francisco	77
1	Saint Mary’s	79
4	Santa Clara	65

Championship; Tuesday, March 12
2	Gonzaga	60
1	Saint Mary’s	69

=== NCAA Tournament ===
Seed	Region	School	First round	Second round	Sweet 16	Elite Eight	Final Four	Championship
5	Midwest	Gonzaga	Defeated (12) McNeese, 86–65	Defeated (4) Kansas, 89–68	Lost to (1) Purdue, 68–80	DNP		
5	West	Saint Mary's	Lost to (12) Grand Canyon, 66–75	DNP				
	Bids	W-L (%):	1–1 (.500)	1–0 (1.000)	0–1 (.000)	0–0 (–)	0–0 (–)	TOTAL: 2–2 (.500)

=== NIT ===
Seed	School	First round	Second round	Quarterfinals	Semifinals	Final
–	San Francisco	Lost to (2) Cincinnati, 72–73 (OT)	DNP			
	W-L (%):	0–1 (.000)	0–0 (–)	0–0 (–)	0–0 (–)	TOTAL: 0–1 (.000)

== All-WCC Awards and Teams ==
On March 5, 2024, the West Coast Conference announced the following awards:

Honor	Recipient	School
Player of the Year	Augustas Marčiulionis	Saint Mary’s
Coach of the Year	Randy Bennett	Saint Mary’s
Defensive Player of the Year	Mitchell Saxen	Saint Mary’s
Newcomer of the Year	Jonathan Mogbo	San Francisco
Sixth Player of the Year	Deuce Turner	San Diego
Freshman of the Year	Ryan Beasley	San Francisco
All-WCC First Team	Michael Ajayi	Pepperdine
All-WCC First Team	Adama-Alpha Bal	Santa Clara
All-WCC First Team	Graham Ike	Gonzaga
All-WCC First Team	Aidan Mahaney	Saint Mary’s
All-WCC First Team	Augustas Marčiulionis	Saint Mary’s
All-WCC First Team	Jonathan Mogbo	San Francisco
All-WCC First Team	Ryan Nembhard	Gonzaga
All-WCC First Team	Mitchell Saxen	Saint Mary’s
All-WCC First Team	Anton Watson	Gonzaga
All-WCC First Team	Marcus Williams	San Francisco
All-WCC Second Team	Alex Ducas	Saint Mary’s
All-WCC Second Team	Nolan Hickman	Gonzaga
All-WCC Second Team	Wayne McKinney III	San Diego
All-WCC Second Team	Tyler Robertson	Portland
All-WCC Second Team	Deuce Turner	San Diego
All-WCC Freshman Team	Ryan Beasley	San Francisco
All-WCC Freshman Team	Jake Ensminger	Santa Clara
All-WCC Freshman Team	Tyler Harris	Portland
All-WCC Freshman Team	Braden Huff	Gonzaga
All-WCC Freshman Team	Kevin Patton Jr.	San Diego
WCC Honorable Mention	Joshua Jefferson	Saint Mary’s
WCC Honorable Mention	Houston Mallette	Pepperdine
WCC Honorable Mention	Carlos Marshall Jr.	Santa Clara
WCC Honorable Mention	Alex Merkviladze	LMU
WCC Honorable Mention	Jevon Porter	Pepperdine
WCC Honorable Mention	Ndewedo Newbury	San Francisco
WCC Honorable Mention	Malik Thomas	San Francisco
WCC Honorable Mention	Christoph Tilly	Santa Clara
