= 2023–24 Pepperdine Waves men's basketball team =

American college basketball season

2023–24 Pepperdine Waves men's basketball
- Conference: West Coast Conference
- Record: 13–20 (5–11 WCC)
- Head coach: Lorenzo Romar (6th, 9th overall season)
- Associate head coach: Ken Bone
- Assistant coaches: Curtis Allen; Gerald Brown
- Home arena: Firestone Fieldhouse

2023–24 West Coast Conference men's basketball standings
	Conf.				Overall
Team	W		L	PCT	W		L	PCT
No. 21 Saint Mary's †	15	–	1	.938	26	–	8	.765
No. 15 Gonzaga	14	–	2	.875	27	–	8	.771
San Francisco	11	–	5	.688	23	–	11	.676
Santa Clara	10	–	6	.625	20	–	13	.606
San Diego	7	–	9	.438	18	–	15	.545
Portland	5	–	11	.313	12	–	21	.364
Loyola Marymount	5	–	11	.313	12	–	19	.387
Pepperdine	5	–	11	.313	13	–	20	.394
Pacific	0	–	16	.000	6	–	26	.188
† 2024 WCC tournament winner Rankings from AP Poll

The 2023–24 Pepperdine Waves men's basketball team represented Pepperdine University during the 2023–24 NCAA Division I men's basketball season. The Waves were led by head coach Lorenzo Romar, in the sixth season of his second stint after coaching the Waves from 1996 to 1999. They played their home games at the Firestone Fieldhouse in Malibu, California as members of the West Coast Conference. They finished the season 13–20, 5–11 in WCC play to finish in a three-way tie for sixth place. As the No. 8 seed in the WCC Tournament, they defeated Pacific in the first round, before losing to San Diego in the second round.

== Previous season ==
The Waves finished the 2022–23 season 9–22, 2–14 in WCC play to finish in last place. They lost in the first round to Pacific of the WCC tournament.

== Offseason ==
=== Departures ===
Name	Number	Pos.	Height	Weight	Year	Hometown	Reason for departure
Mike Mitchell Jr.	1	G	6'2"	185	Sophomore	San Jose, CA	Transferred to Minnesota
Jay Yoon	5	G	6'4"	195	RS senior	Arcadia, CA	Walk-on; graduated
Carson Basham	11	C	6'10"	210	Sophomore	Phoenix, AZ	Transferred to Northern Arizona
Majok Deng	22	G	6'4"	190	RS junior	Tucson, AZ	Transferred to Colorado School of Mines
Maxwell Lewis	24	F	6'7"	195	Sophomore	Las Vegas, NV	Declare for 2023 NBA draft; selected 40th overall by Denver Nuggets
Jan Zidek	31	F	6'9"	240	Senior	Prague, Czech Republic	Graduate transferred to Chattanooga

=== Incoming transfers ===
Name	Number	Pos.	Height	Weight	Year	Hometown	Previous school
Michael Ajayi	1	G	6'7"		Junior	Kent, WA	Pierce College
Ethan Anderson	20	G	6'1"	208	GS senior	Los Angeles, CA	Wyoming

=== Recruiting classes ===
==== 2023 recruiting class ====
College recruiting
Name	Hometown	School	Height	Weight	Commit date
Nils Cooper #36 SG	Santa Monica, CA	Crossroads School	6 ft 4 in (1.93 m)	185 lb (84 kg)	Jul 8, 2021
Nils Cooper #36 SG	Recruit ratings: Scout: Rivals: 247Sports: ESPN: (79)				
Martin Gumwel; C	Sudan	Rancho Christian School	6 ft 11 in (2.11 m)	200 lb (91 kg)	Aug 19, 2022
Martin Gumwel; C	Recruit ratings: Scout: Rivals: 247Sports: ESPN: (NR)				
Curtis Williams; SF	Beaumont, CA	Etiwanda High School	6 ft 6 in (1.98 m)	175 lb (79 kg)	Nov 7, 2021
Curtis Williams; SF	Recruit ratings: Scout: Rivals: 247Sports: ESPN: (NR)				
John Squire; PF	Sausalito, CA	St. Ignatius College Prep	6 ft 8 in (2.03 m)	N/A	Nov 9, 2022
John Squire; PF	Recruit ratings: Scout: Rivals: 247Sports: ESPN: (NR)				
Overall recruit ranking: Scout: nr Rivals: nr ESPN: nr
Note: In many cases, Scout, Rivals, 247Sports, On3, and ESPN may conflict in their listings of height and weight.; In these cases, the average was taken. ESPN grades are on a 100-point scale.; Sources: "Pepperdine Waves 2023 Basketball Commitments". Rivals.; "2023 Pepperdine Waves Basketball Commits". Scout.; "ESPN 2023 Pepperdine Waves Basketball recruits". ESPN.; "Scout.com Team Recruiting Rankings". Scout.; "2023 Team Ranking". Rivals.

==== 2024 recruiting class ====
College recruiting (2024)
Name	Hometown	School	Height	Weight	Commit date
Marley Zeller; SG	Portland, OR	Central Catholic High School	6 ft 5 in (1.96 m)	175 lb (79 kg)	Jun 25, 2023
Marley Zeller; SG	Recruit ratings: Scout: Rivals: 247Sports: ESPN: (NR)				
Overall recruit ranking: Scout: nr Rivals: nr ESPN: nr
Note: In many cases, Scout, Rivals, 247Sports, On3, and ESPN may conflict in their listings of height and weight.; In these cases, the average was taken. ESPN grades are on a 100-point scale.; Sources: "Pepperdine Waves 2024 Basketball Commitments". Rivals.; "2024 Pepperdine Waves Basketball Commits". Scout.; "ESPN 2024 Pepperdine Waves Basketball recruits". ESPN.; "Scout.com Team Recruiting Rankings". Scout.; "2024 Team Ranking". Rivals.

== Roster ==
2023–24 Pepperdine Waves men's basketball team
Players
Coaches

Pos.	#	Name	Height	Weight	Year	Previous school	Hometown
G	0	Houston Mallette	6 ft 5 in (1.96 m)	185 lb (84 kg)	Jr	Pacifica Christian HS	Alameda, CA
G/F	1	Michael Ajayi	6 ft 7 in (2.01 m)	220 lb (100 kg)	Jr	Kentwood HS; Pierce College	Kent, WA
F	2	Jalen Pitre	6 ft 8 in (2.03 m)	220 lb (100 kg)	So	Woodstock Academy	Long Beach, CA
G	3	Malik Moore	6 ft 5 in (1.96 m)	190 lb (86 kg)	So	Heritage Christian School	Ventura, CA
F	10	Paul Jordan (W)	6 ft 6 in (1.98 m)	200 lb (91 kg)	RS So	Long Island Lutheran HS	Glen Cove, NY
F	12	Boubacar Coulibaly	6 ft 10 in (2.08 m)	225 lb (102 kg)	RS Jr	San Gabriel Academy; USC	Bamako, Mali
G	13	Cord Stansberry	6 ft 3 in (1.91 m)	180 lb (82 kg)	RS Fr	Woodstock Academy	Long Beach, CA
F	14	Jevon Porter	6 ft 11 in (2.11 m)	225 lb (102 kg)	So	Tolton HS	Columbia, MO
G	20	Ethan Anderson	6 ft 0 in (1.83 m)	215 lb (98 kg)	GS	Fairfax HS; Wyoming	Los Angeles, CA
G	21	Nils Cooper	6 ft 5 in (1.96 m)	180 lb (82 kg)	Fr	Crossroads School	Los Angeles, CA
G/F	23	Curtis Williams	6 ft 6 in (1.98 m)	180 lb (82 kg)	Fr	Etiwanda HS	Beaumont, CA
F	24	John Squire	6 ft 8 in (2.03 m)	220 lb (100 kg)	Fr	St. Ignatius College Prep	Sausalito, CA
G	33	David Mager (W)	6 ft 3 in (1.91 m)	180 lb (82 kg)	RS Fr	Dwight-Englewood School	Englewood, NJ
G	34	Martin Gumwel	6 ft 11 in (2.11 m)	230 lb (104 kg)	Fr	Rancho Christian School	Temecula, CA
F/C	35	Aladji Gassama	6 ft 9 in (2.06 m)	215 lb (98 kg)	RS So	De Smet Jesuit HS	Bamako, Mali

Head coach

- Lorenzo Romar (Washington)

Assistant coach(es)

- Ken Bone (Seattle Pacific)
- Curtis Allen (Washington)
- Gerald Brown (Pepperdine)

Legend

- (C) Team captain
- (S) Suspended
- (I) Ineligible
- (W) Walk-on
- Injured
- Current redshirt

Roster

== Schedule and results ==
Date time, TV	Rank^{#}	Opponent^{#}	Result	Record	High points	High rebounds	High assists	Site city, state
Non conference regular season
November 6, 2023*; 7:00 p.m., ESPN+		Concordia Irvine	W 76–64	1–0	26 – Mallette	7 – Ajayi	3 – Anderson	Firestone Fieldhouse (1,067); Malibu, CA
November 9, 2023*; 2:30 p.m., ESPN+		at UC Davis	L 78–79	1–1	18 – Ajayi	14 – Ajayi	3 – Moore	University Credit Union Center; Davis, CA
November 12, 2023*; 1:00 p.m., ESPN+		Lafayette	W 76–53	2–1	27 – Ajayi	11 – Ajayi	4 – Moore	Firestone Fieldhouse; Malibu, CA
November 13, 2023*; 7:00 p.m., ESPN+		LIU	W 88–53	3–1	24 – Mallette	12 – Ajayi	4 – Anderson	Firestone Fieldhouse; Malibu, CA
November 17, 2023*; 7:00 p.m., ESPN+		UNLV	L 68–82	3–2	31 – Ajayi	12 – Ajayi	6 – Anderson	Firestone Fieldhouse; Malibu, CA
November 21, 2023*; 5:45 p.m., FloHoops		vs. UC Irvine; Ball Dawgs Classic	L 60–76	3–3	16 – Ajayi	11 – Ajayi	3 – Ajayi	Dollar Loan Center; Henderson, NV
November 22, 2023*; 4:00 p.m., FloHoops		vs. Indiana State; Ball Dawgs Classic	L 82–90	3–4	31 – Mallette	8 – Ajayi	5 – Tied	Dollar Loan Center; Henderson, NV
November 24, 2023*; 3:45 p.m., FloHoops		vs. New Mexico; Ball Dawgs Classic	L 71–90	3–5	18 – Moore	13 – Ajayi	5 – Anderson	Dollar Loan Center; Henderson, NV
November 28, 2023*; 7:00 p.m., ESPN+		Idaho State	W 77–62	4–5	25 – Ajayi	10 – Ajayi	6 – Anderson	Firestone Fieldhouse (484); Malibu, CA
December 3, 2023*; 2:00 p.m., P12N		at Colorado	L 66–91	4–6	15 – Mallette	6 – Tied	3 – Mallette	CU Events Center (7,231); Boulder, CO
December 6, 2023*; 7:00 p.m., ESPN+		Cal State Fullerton	L 55–60	4–7	20 – Jones	6 – Square	3 – Jones	Firestone Fieldhouse (N/A); Malibu, CA
December 9, 2023*; 7:00 p.m., ESPN+		UC San Diego	W 68–62	5–7	19 – Mallette	10 – Ajayi	4 – Tied	Firestone Fieldhouse (407); Malibu, CA
December 17, 2023*; 11:00 a.m., ACCN		at Louisville	L 63–85	5–8	17 – Ajayi	7 – Ajayi	3 – Tied	KFC Yum! Center (10,475); Louisville, KY
December 21, 2023*; 4:00 p.m., ESPN+		William & Mary	W 71–59	6–8	16 – Ajayi	13 – Coulibaly	3 – Anderson	Firestone Fieldhouse (207); Malibu, CA
December 29, 2023*; 4:00 p.m., ESPN+		Westcliff	W 83–47	7–8	18 – Porter	15 – Coulibaly	5 – Mallette	Firestone Fieldhouse (312); Malibu, CA
WCC regular season
January 4, 2024; 6:00 p.m., ESPN+		at No. 24 Gonzaga; CCF Classic	L 60–86	7–9 (0–1)	15 – Mallette	14 – Ajayi	4 – Anderson	Spokane Arena (12,015); Spokane, WA
January 6, 2024; 7:00 p.m., ESPN+		Santa Clara	L 72–78	7–10 (0–2)	27 – Ajayi	10 – Ajayi	8 – Anderson	Firestone Fieldhouse (1,653); Malibu, CA
January 11, 2024; 7:00 p.m., ESPN+		Pacific	W 93–78	8–10 (1–2)	26 – Porter	7 – Ajayi	8 – Anderson	Firestone Fieldhouse (602); Malibu, CA
January 13, 2024; 7:00 p.m., ESPN+		at San Diego	W 83–77	9–10 (2–2)	24 – Ajayi	12 – Ajayi	5 – Mallette	Jenny Craig Pavilion (631); San Diego, CA
January 18, 2024; 7:00 p.m., ESPN+		Gonzaga	L 61–86	9–11 (2–3)	16 – Porter	4 – Tied	5 – Anderson	Firestone Fieldhouse (3,128); Malibu, CA
January 20, 2024; 7:00 p.m., ESPN+		Loyola Marymount	L 61–68	9–12 (2–4)	24 – Porter	12 – Porter	2 – Tied	Firestone Fieldhouse (927); Malibu, CA
January 25, 2024; 7:00 p.m., ESPN+		at Santa Clara	L 71–94	9–13 (2–5)	22 – Ajayi	8 – Ajayi	4 – Porter	Leavey Center (1,686); Santa Clara, CA
January 27, 2024; 5:00 p.m., ESPN+		San Diego	L 67–69	9–14 (2–6)	19 – Ajayi	8 – Porter	3 – Mallette	Firestone Fieldhouse (821); Malibu, CA
February 3, 2024; 5:00 p.m., ESPN+		at Portland	L 89–93	9–15 (2–7)	28 – Mallette	14 – Ajayi	3 – Tied	Chiles Center (1,516); Portland, OR
February 8, 2024; 8:00 p.m., ESPNU		San Francisco	L 74–80	9–16 (2–8)	21 – Porter	9 – Porter	4 – Ajayi	Firestone Fieldhouse (913); Malibu, CA
February 10, 2024; 6:00 p.m., ESPN+		at Loyola Marymount	W 72–63	10–16 (3–8)	17 – Ajayi	13 – Ajayi	4 – Moore	Gersten Pavilion (1,607); Los Angeles, CA
February 15, 2024; 8:00 p.m., CBSSN		at No. 18 Saint Mary's	L 59–103	10–17 (3–9)	13 – Porter	4 – Ajayi	3 – Ajayi	University Credit Union Pavilion (3,500); Moraga, CA
February 17, 2024; 7:00 p.m., ESPN+		Portland	W 91–70	11–17 (4–9)	26 – Ajayi	8 – Ajayi	4 – Tied	Firestone Fieldhouse (823); Malibu, CA
February 21, 2024; 7:00 p.m., ESPN+		at Pacific	W 89–70	12–17 (5–9)	30 – Ajayi	17 – Ajayi	4 – Porter	Alex G. Spanos Center (1,076); Stockton, CA
February 24, 2024; 7:00 p.m., ESPN+		at San Francisco	L 68–92	12–18 (5–10)	23 – Porter	10 – Ajayi	4 – Mallette	War Memorial Gymnasium (3,284); San Francisco, CA
February 29, 2024; 8:00 p.m., CBSSN		No. 17 Saint Mary's	L 57–83	12–19 (5–11)	22 – Porter	8 – Ajayi	3 – Porter	Firestone Fieldhouse (1,057); Malibu, CA
WCC tournament
March 7, 2024; 2:30 p.m., ESPN+	(8)	vs. (9) Pacific; First round	W 102–43	13–19	28 – Porter	17 – Ajayi	6 – Anderson	Orleans Arena (647); Paradise, NV
March 8, 2024; 6:00 p.m., ESPN+	(8)	vs. (5) San Diego; Second round	L 52–57	13–20	16 – Moore	15 – Ajayi	8 – Anderson	Orleans Arena (2,181); Paradise, NV
*Non-conference game. ^{#}Rankings from AP Poll. (#) Tournament seedings in parentheses. All times are in Pacific Time.
