= 2023–24 Loyola Marymount Lions men's basketball team =

American college basketball season

2023–24 Loyola Marymount Lions men's basketball
- Conference: West Coast Conference
- Record: 12–19 (5–11 WCC)
- Head coach: Stan Johnson (4th season)
- Assistant coaches: David Carter; Greg Youncofski; David Marek
- Home arena: Gersten Pavilion

2023–24 West Coast Conference men's basketball standings
	Conf.				Overall
Team	W		L	PCT	W		L	PCT
No. 21 Saint Mary's †	15	–	1	.938	26	–	8	.765
No. 15 Gonzaga	14	–	2	.875	27	–	8	.771
San Francisco	11	–	5	.688	23	–	11	.676
Santa Clara	10	–	6	.625	20	–	13	.606
San Diego	7	–	9	.438	18	–	15	.545
Portland	5	–	11	.313	12	–	21	.364
Loyola Marymount	5	–	11	.313	12	–	19	.387
Pepperdine	5	–	11	.313	13	–	20	.394
Pacific	0	–	16	.000	6	–	26	.188
† 2024 WCC tournament winner Rankings from AP Poll

The 2023–24 Loyola Marymount Lions men's basketball team represented Loyola Marymount University during the 2023–24 NCAA Division I men's basketball season. The Lions, led by fourth-year head coach Stan Johnson, played their home games at Gersten Pavilion in Los Angeles, California as members of the West Coast Conference. They finished the season 12–19, 5–11 in WCC play to finish in a three-way tie for sixth place. As the No. 7 seed in the WCC Tournament, they lost to Portland in the second round.

== Previous season ==
The Lions finished the 2022–23 season 19–12, 9–7 in WCC play to finish in fourth place. They lost in the quarterfinals of the WCC tournament to BYU.

== Offseason ==
=== Departures ===
Name	Number	Pos.	Height	Weight	Year	Hometown	Reason for departure
Jalin Anderson	0	G	6'3"	175	Junior	Jackson, TN	Transferred to Ball State
Dameane Douglas	1	G/F	6'7"	205	RS senior	Hanford, CA	Left the team due to personal reasons
Justin Ahrens	2	G	6'6"	195	GS senior	Versailles, OH	Graduated
Chase Stephens	3	G	6'3"	170	freshman	Riverside, CA	Transferred to Maryland
Kwane Marble	11	G	6'5"	206	Senior	Denver, CO	Graduate transferred to Niagara
James Nobles	14	G	6'4"	160	RS Freshman	North Hollywood, CA	Transferred
Cameron Shelton	20	G	6'2"	185	RS senior	Chino, CA	Graduated
Kian Nader	40	G	6'1"	170	Junior	Tarzana, CA	Walk-on; transferred

=== Incoming transfers ===
Name	Number	Pos.	Height	Weight	Year	Hometown	Previous school
Justice Hill	3	G	6'0"	175	Senior	Little Rock, AR	LSU
Will Johnston	4	G	6'3"	180	Junior	Sydney, Australia	UTRGV
Justin Wright	5	G	6'2"	195	Senior	Greenville, NC	North Carolina Central
Lars Thiemann	15	C	7'1"	260	GS senior	Krefeld, Germany	California
Dominick Harris	55	G	6'3"	185	RS junior	Murrieta, CA	Gonzaga

=== Recruiting classes ===
==== 2023 recruiting class ====
College recruiting
Name	Hometown	School	Height	Weight	Commit date
Aaron McBride; PF	Corona, CA	Centennial HS	6 ft 7 in (2.01 m)	200 lb (91 kg)	Jul 1, 2022
Aaron McBride; PF	Recruit ratings: Scout: Rivals: 247Sports: ESPN: (80)				
Jovan Ristic; SF	Belgrade Serbia	Calusa Preparatory School	6 ft 5 in (1.96 m)	205 lb (93 kg)	Jul 6, 2023
Jovan Ristic; SF	Recruit ratings: Scout: Rivals: 247Sports: ESPN: (80)				
Overall recruit ranking: Scout: nr Rivals: nr ESPN: nr
Note: In many cases, Scout, Rivals, 247Sports, On3, and ESPN may conflict in their listings of height and weight.; In these cases, the average was taken. ESPN grades are on a 100-point scale.; Sources: "Loyola Marymount Lions 2023 Basketball Commitments". Rivals.; "2023 Loyola Marymount Lions Basketball Commits". Scout.; "ESPN 2023 Loyola Marymount Lions Basketball recruits". ESPN.; "Scout.com Team Recruiting Rankings". Scout.; "2023 Team Ranking". Rivals.

== Roster ==
2023–24 Loyola Marymount Lions men's basketball team
Players
Coaches

Pos.	#	Name	Height	Weight	Year	Previous school	Hometown
G	3	Justice Hill	6 ft 0 in (1.83 m)	175 lb (79 kg)	Sr	Little Rock Christian Academy; LSU	Little Rock, AR
G	4	Will Johnston	6 ft 3 in (1.91 m)	180 lb (82 kg)	Jr	The King's School; UTRGV	Sydney, Australia
G	5	Justin Wright	6 ft 2 in (1.88 m)	195 lb (88 kg)	Sr	Farmville Central HS; North Carolina Central	Greenville, NC
F	8	Jovan Ristic	6 ft 5 in (1.96 m)	205 lb (93 kg)	Fr	Calusa Preparatory School	Belgrade, Serbia
G	10	Noah Taitz	6 ft 3 in (1.91 m)	190 lb (86 kg)	RS Jr	Bishop Gorman HS; Stanford	Las Vegas, NV
G	13	Lamaj Lewis	6 ft 6 in (1.98 m)	210 lb (95 kg)	Jr	St. John Charter HS	Paramount, CA
F/C	15	Lars Thiemann	7 ft 1 in (2.16 m)	260 lb (118 kg)	GS	Bayer Giants U19; California	Krefeld, Germany
F	16	Aaron McBride	6 ft 6 in (1.98 m)	210 lb (95 kg)	Fr	Centennial HS	Corona, CA
F	21	Michael Graham	6 ft 8 in (2.03 m)	235 lb (107 kg)	Sr	Canterbury School; Elon	Brooklyn, NY
C	22	Rick Issanza	7 ft 1 in (2.16 m)	245 lb (111 kg)	RS Sr	Bella Vista Prep; Oklahoma	Kinshasa, Congo
F	23	Alex Merkviladze	6 ft 8 in (2.03 m)	245 lb (111 kg)	Sr	Modesto Christian School; Cal State Northridge	Kutaisi, Georgia
F	34	Keli Leaupepe	6 ft 6 in (1.98 m)	240 lb (109 kg)	GS	Box Hill Senior	Melbourne, Australia
G	41	Kevin Carney (W)	5 ft 11 in (1.8 m)	160 lb (73 kg)	So	Sacred Heart Prep	Menlo Park, CA
F	42	George Tupy (W)	6 ft 6 in (1.98 m)	225 lb (102 kg)	Fr	St. Francis HS	Sierra Madre, CA
G	55	Dominick Harris	6 ft 3 in (1.91 m)	190 lb (86 kg)	RS Jr	Rancho Christian HS; Gonzaga	Murrieta, CA

Head coach

- Stan Johnson (Bemidji State)

Assistant coach(es)

- David Carter (Saint Mary's)
- Greg Youncofski (Kansas)
- David Marek (Southern Utah)

Legend

- (C) Team captain
- (S) Suspended
- (I) Ineligible
- (W) Walk-on
- Injured
- Current redshirt

Roster

== Schedule and results ==
Date time, TV	Rank^{#}	Opponent^{#}	Result	Record	High points	High rebounds	High assists	Site (attendance) city, state
Non-conference regular season
November 7, 2023*; 7:00 p.m., ESPN+		Westcliff	W 109–68	1–0	18 – Merkviladze	8 – Johnston	5 – Hill	Gersten Pavilion (1,430); Los Angeles, CA
November 12, 2023*; 3:00 p.m., ESPN+		Yale	L 80–83	1–1	21 – Harris	5 – Tied	4 – Johnston	Gersten Pavilion (1,571); Los Angeles, CA
November 14, 2023*; 7:00 p.m., ESPN+		Jackson State	W 88–66	2–1	23 – Hill	12 – Leaupepe	8 – Hill	Gersten Pavilion (1,015); Los Angeles, CA
November 19, 2023*; 10:30 a.m., FloSports		vs. Stephen F. Austin; Cayman Islands Classic quarterfinals	L 76–86	2–2	24 – Hill	8 – Leaupepe	4 – Leaupepe	John Gray Gymnasium; George Town, Cayman Islands
November 20, 2023*; 11:00 a.m., FloSports		vs. Oakland; Cayman Islands Classic Semifinals	L 69–74	2–3	22 – Johnston	7 – Thiemann	4 – Harris	John Gray Gymnasium; George Town, Cayman Islands
November 21, 2023*; 8:00 a.m., FloSports		vs. FIU; Cayman Islands Classic 7th place game	W 61–60	3–3	15 – Wright	8 – Wright	2 – Tied	John Gray Gymnasium; George Town, Cayman Islands
November 25, 2023*; 4:00 p.m., ESPN+		UTEP	W 67–47	4–3	20 – Wright	9 – Merkviladze	4 – Hill	Gersten Pavilion (750); Los Angeles, CA
November 29, 2023*; 7:00 p.m., ESPN+		Central Arkansas	W 90–63	5–3	31 – Harris	7 – Wright	7 – Hill	Gersten Pavilion (752); Los Angeles, CA
December 2, 2023*; 7:00 p.m.		at Nevada	L 59–73	5–4	15 – Johnston	6 – Merkviladze	4 – Johnston	Lawlor Events Center (7,851); Reno, NV
December 9, 2023*; 7:00 p.m.		vs. UNLV; Jack Jones Classic	W 78–75	6–4	28 – Harris	9 – Merkviladze	7 – Hill	Dollar Loan Center; Henderson, NV
December 16, 2023*; 1:30 p.m., ESPN+		vs. UC Santa Barbara; Jerry Colangelo Classic	L 59–68	6–5	18 – Merkviladze	9 – Merkviladze	5 – Hill	Footprint Center; Phoenix, AZ
December 18, 2023*; 7:00 p.m., ESPN+		Detroit Mercy	W 76–56	7–5	19 – Wright	11 – Graham	6 – Wright	Gersten Pavilion (926); Los Angeles, CA
December 22, 2023*; 7:00 p.m., ESPN+		No. 16 Colorado State	L 67–76	7–6	27 – Johnston	5 – Issanza	3 – Tied	Gersten Pavilion (1,365); Los Angeles, CA
December 29, 2023*; 7:00 p.m., ESPN+		Tarleton State	L 66–79	7–7	18 – Wright	5 – Tied	4 – Johnston	Gersten Pavilion (818); Los Angeles, CA
WCC regular season
January 4, 2024; 8:00 p.m., ESPN+		Santa Clara	L 57–68	7–8 (0–1)	14 – Leaupepe	9 – Merkviladze	3 – Harris	Gersten Pavilion (958); Los Angeles, CA
January 6, 2024; 6:00 p.m., ESPN+		Saint Mary's	L 64–68	7–9 (0–2)	19 – Johnston	7 – Leaupepe	6 – Johnston	Gersten Pavilion (1,566); Los Angeles, CA
January 13, 2024; 6:00 p.m., ESPN+		Pacific	W 81–64	8–9 (1–2)	22 – Wright	11 – Merkviladze	2 – Tied	Gersten Pavilion (1,122); Los Angeles, CA
January 18, 2024; 8:00 p.m., CBSSN		at San Francisco	L 74–90	8–10 (1–3)	22 – Harris	9 – Merkviladze	4 – Leaupepe	War Memorial Gymnasium (1,849); San Francisco, CA
January 20, 2024; 7:00 p.m., ESPN+		at Pepperdine	W 68–61	9–10 (2–3)	16 – Harris	8 – Leaupepe	5 – Johnston	Firestone Fieldhouse (927); Malibu, CA
January 25, 2024; 7:00 p.m., ESPN+		Portland	W 92–65	10–10 (3–3)	25 – Merkviladze	10 – Merkviladze	8 – Wright	Gersten Pavilion (991); Los Angeles, CA
January 27, 2024; 7:00 p.m., ESPNU		at Saint Mary's	L 65–70	10–11 (3–4)	15 – Tied	6 – Leaupepe	5 – Hill	University Credit Union Pavilion (3,500); Moraga, CA
January 30, 2024; 8:00 p.m., ESPN		at Gonzaga	L 58–92	10–12 (3–5)	14 – Hill	7 – Wright	3 – Wright	McCarthey Athletic Center (6,000); Spokane, WA
February 7, 2024; 7:00 p.m., ESPN+		at San Diego	L 77–79	10–13 (3–6)	19 – Hill	8 – Tied	5 – Hill	Jenny Craig Pavilion (1,003); San Diego, CA
February 10, 2024; 6:00 p.m., ESPN+		Pepperdine	L 63–72	10–14 (3–7)	17 – Merkviladze	9 – Merkviladze	5 – Hill	Gersten Pavilion (1,607); Los Angeles, CA
February 15, 2024; 6:00 p.m., CBSSN		Gonzaga	L 74–91	10–15 (3–8)	33 – Johnston	7 – Thiemann	7 – Hill	Gersten Pavilion (2,827); Los Angeles, CA
February 17, 2024; 6:00 p.m., ESPN+		San Francisco	L 59–82	10–16 (3–9)	24 – Merkviladze	12 – Merkviladze	4 – Hill	Gersten Pavilion (2,057); Los Angeles, CA
February 22, 2024; 8:00 p.m., CBSSN		at Santa Clara	L 55–65	10–17 (3–10)	19 – Wright	13 – Merkviladze	2 – Wright	Leavey Center (2,385); Santa Clara, CA
February 24, 2024; 7:00 p.m., ESPN+		at Pacific	W 86–63	11–17 (4–10)	24 – Hill	12 – Merkviladze	7 – Hill	Alex G. Spanos Center (1,959); Stockton, CA
February 29, 2024; 7:00 p.m., ESPN+		San Diego	W 96–62	12–17 (5–10)	26 – Johnston	13 – Graham	6 – Hill	Gersten Pavilion (1,113); Los Angeles, CA
March 2, 2024; 5:00 p.m., ESPN+		at Portland	L 60–70	12–18 (5–11)	16 – Hill	7 – Tied	7 – Merkviladze	Chiles Center (1,165); Portland, OR
WCC tournament
March 8, 2024; 8:30 p.m., ESPN+	(7)	vs. (6) Portland; Second round	L 70–78	12–19	20 – Hill	8 – Tied	6 – Hill	Orleans Arena (2,181); Paradise, NV
*Non-conference game. ^{#}Rankings from AP Poll. (#) Tournament seedings in parentheses.
