= 2024 West Coast Conference men's basketball tournament =

American college basketball postseason tournament

- Classification: Division I
- Season: 2023–24
- Teams: 9
- Site: Orleans Arena; Paradise, Nevada
- Champions: Saint Mary’s (5th title)
- Winning coach: Randy Bennett (4th title)
- Attendance: 17,088 (total); 5,794 (championship)
- Television: ESPN+, ESPN, ESPN2

2023–24 West Coast Conference men's basketball standings
	Conf.				Overall
Team	W		L	PCT	W		L	PCT
No. 21 Saint Mary's †	15	–	1	.938	26	–	8	.765
No. 15 Gonzaga	14	–	2	.875	27	–	8	.771
San Francisco	11	–	5	.688	23	–	11	.676
Santa Clara	10	–	6	.625	20	–	13	.606
San Diego	7	–	9	.438	18	–	15	.545
Portland	5	–	11	.313	12	–	21	.364
Loyola Marymount	5	–	11	.313	12	–	19	.387
Pepperdine	5	–	11	.313	13	–	20	.394
Pacific	0	–	16	.000	6	–	26	.188
† 2024 WCC tournament winner Rankings from AP Poll

The 2024 West Coast Conference men's basketball Tournament was a postseason men's basketball tournament for the West Coast Conference for the 2023–24 season. All tournament games were played at Orleans Arena in the Las Vegas-area community of Paradise, Nevada, from March 7–12, 2024. TritonPoint Wealth and Sterling Global were the presenting sponsors of the 2024 tournament.

== Seeds ==
All 9 conference teams are scheduled to participate in the tournament. Teams will be seeded by record within the conference, with a tiebreaker system to seed teams with identical conference records. The tiebreakers are to operate in the following order:

1. Head-to-head record
2. Record against the top-seeded team not involved in the tie, going down through the standings until the tie is broken
3. NET rating after the final regular-season conference games on March 2

Seed	School	Conf. record	Tiebreaker(s)
1	Saint Mary's	15–1	
2	Gonzaga	14–2	
3	San Francisco	11–5	
4	Santa Clara	10–6	
5	San Diego	7–9	
6	Portland	5–11	1–1 vs. Santa Clara
7	Loyola Marymount	5–11	NET: 187
8	Pepperdine	5–11	NET: 245
9	Pacific	0–16	

== Schedule and results ==
Game	Time	Matchup	Score	Television	Attendance
First Round - Thursday, March 7
1	2:30 pm	No. 8 Pepperdine vs. No. 9 Pacific	102–43	ESPN+	647
Second Round - Friday, March 8
2	6:00 pm	No. 5 San Diego vs. No. 8 Pepperdine	57–52	ESPN+	2,181
3	8:30 pm	No. 6 Portland vs. No. 7 Loyola Marymount	78–70	ESPN+	2,181
Quarterfinals – Saturday, March 9
4	7:00 pm	No. 4 Santa Clara vs. No. 5 San Diego	104–79	ESPN2	2,781
5	9:30 pm	No. 3 San Francisco vs. No. 6 Portland	72–51	ESPN2	2,781
Semifinals - Monday, March 11
6	6:00 pm	No. 1 Saint Mary’s vs. No. 4 Santa Clara	79–65	ESPN	5,685
7	8:30 pm	No. 2 Gonzaga vs. No. 3 San Francisco	89–77	ESPN2	5,685
Final – Tuesday, March 12
8	6:00 pm	No. 1 Saint Mary’s vs. No. 2 Gonzaga	69–60	ESPN	5,794
Game times in Pacific Time; Rankings denote tournament seed

== Bracket ==
First round Thursday, March 7
8	Pepperdine	102
9	Pacific	43

Second round Friday, March 8
6	Portland	78
7	Loyola Marymount	70
5	San Diego	57
8	Pepperdine	52

Third round Saturday, March 9
3	San Francisco	72
6	Portland	51
4	Santa Clara	104
5	San Diego	79

Semifinals; Monday, March 11
2	Gonzaga	89
3	San Francisco	77
1	Saint Mary’s	79
4	Santa Clara	65

Championship; Tuesday, March 12
2	Gonzaga	60
1	Saint Mary's	69

== See also ==
- 2024 West Coast Conference women's basketball tournament
