= NBA Academy =

Basketball development program

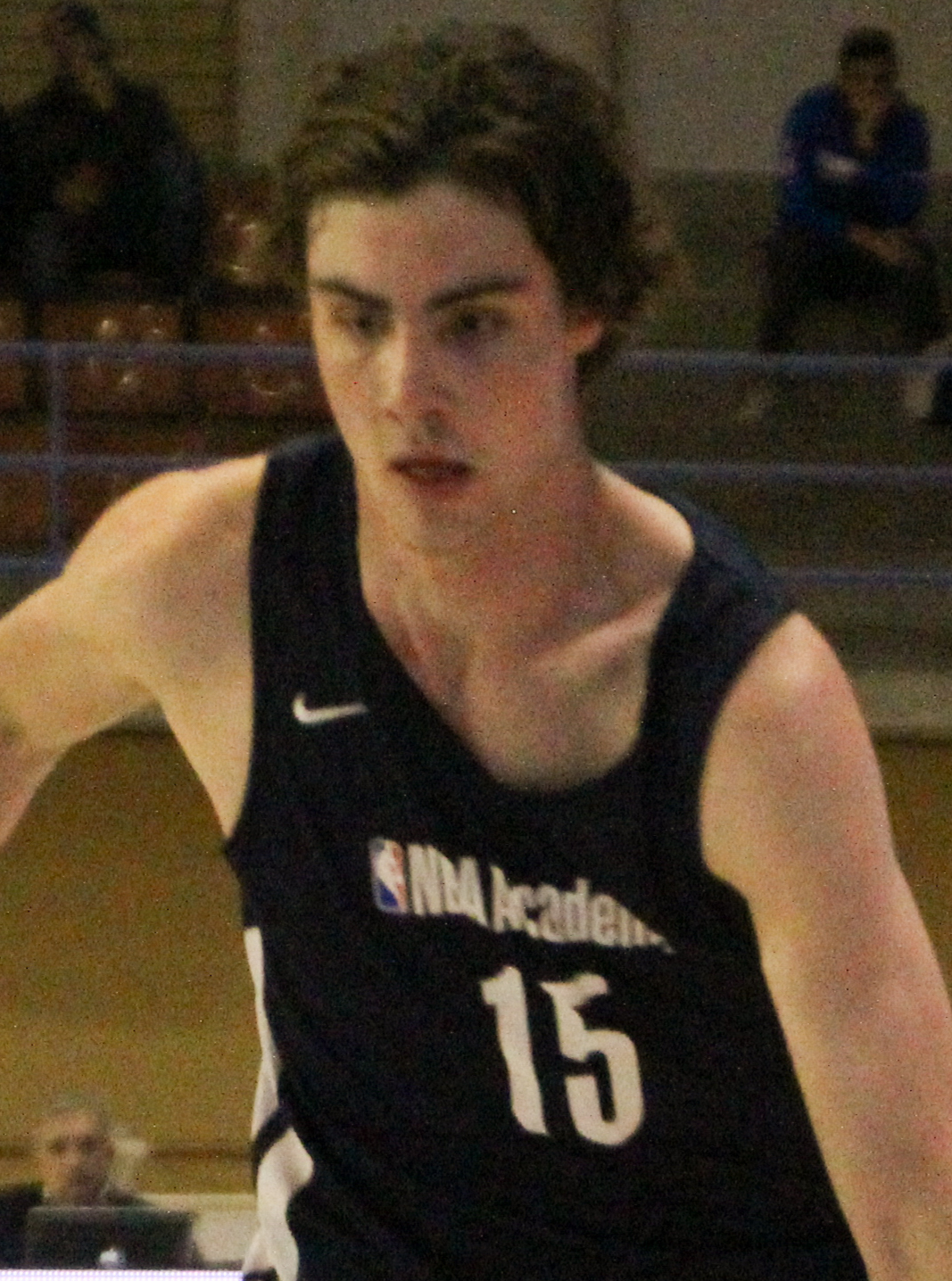
Josh Giddey, the first NBA Academy player selected in the NBA draft, playing against the Joventut de Badalona.

The NBA Academy is a basketball development initiative created by the National Basketball Association (NBA) that develops top international high school-age prospects. The program includes academies across India, Australia (known as the Global Academy via the BA Centre of Excellence), Mexico (known as the NBA Academy Latin America), and Senegal (known as the NBA Academy Africa) for top prospects from their respective countries and continents.

The program provides player development in addition to education, housing, and mentorship.

== History ==
The NBA Academy was launched in 2016 to provide a comprehensive development pathway for young elite athletes in their home regions. NBA academies recruit talent through their Jr. NBA programs, which are located in over 75 countries.

The NBA began by partnering with three government-operated camps in China that same year to help develop young Chinese players for professional basketball. In 2017, the league launched academies in India, Australia, and Africa. In 2018, the NBA opened an academy in Mexico City.

The NBA formerly had a location in Xinjiang, China, but it was closed in June 2019 due to multiple controversies.

As of May 2020, more than 25 NBA Academy graduates committed to NCAA Division I schools. Josh Giddey became the first NBA Academy Graduate selected in the NBA draft in 2021. He was selected with the sixth overall pick by the Oklahoma City Thunder.

== Notable players ==
=== Global Academy (Australia) ===
- Josh Giddey
- Dyson Daniels
- Hyunjung Lee
- Jonathan Tchamwa Tchatchoua
- Francisco Caffaro
- Anyang Garang
- Derrick Michael Xzavierro
- Alex Condon

=== India ===
- Prashant Singh Rawat
- Princepal Singh

=== Latin America ===
- Bennedict Mathurin
- Oumar Ballo
- Santiago Véscovi (Note: Véscovi also spent time in the Global Academy.)
- Olivier-Maxence Prosper
- Jermaine Miranda Perez
- Malik Wade

=== Africa ===
- Ibou Badji
- Abdoul Halil Barre
- Timothy Ighoefe
- Nelly Junior Joseph

== Controversy ==
In July 2020, the NBA faced complaints from its employees over human rights concerns within the NBA Academy located in China. According to the findings of an ESPN investigation, American coaches at three NBA training academies in China told league officials their Chinese partners were physically abusing young players and failing to provide schooling, even though NBA Commissioner Adam Silver had said that education would be central to the program.

Following the opening of an NBA Academy in Xinjiang, American coaches were frequently harassed and surveilled. One American coach was detained three times without cause; he and others were unable to obtain housing because of their status as foreigners, with one employee describing it as adjacent to "World War II Germany".

== See also ==
- Basketball Australia Centre of Excellence
- Basketball Without Borders
