= 2024–25 Pepperdine Waves men's basketball team =

American college basketball season

2024–25 Pepperdine Waves men's basketball
- Conference: West Coast Conference
- Record: 13–22 (4–14 WCC)
- Head coach: Ed Schilling (1st season)
- Assistant coaches: Scott Rigot; Tyus Edney; Josh Calbert; Mike Doig; Jeremy Grubbs
- Home arena: Firestone Fieldhouse

2024–25 West Coast Conference men's basketball standings
	Conf.				Overall
Team	W		L	PCT	W		L	PCT
No. 24 Saint Mary's	17	–	1	.944	29	–	6	.829
No. 23 Gonzaga †	14	–	4	.778	26	–	9	.743
San Francisco	13	–	5	.722	25	–	10	.714
Santa Clara	12	–	6	.667	21	–	13	.618
Oregon State	10	–	8	.556	20	–	13	.606
Washington State	8	–	10	.444	19	–	15	.559
Loyola Marymount	8	–	10	.444	17	–	15	.531
Portland	7	–	11	.389	12	–	20	.375
Pepperdine	4	–	14	.222	13	–	22	.371
Pacific	4	–	14	.222	9	–	24	.273
San Diego	2	–	16	.111	6	–	27	.182
† 2025 WCC tournament winner Rankings from AP poll

The 2024–25 Pepperdine Waves men's basketball team represented Pepperdine University during the 2024–25 NCAA Division I men's basketball season. The Waves, led by first-year head coach Ed Schilling, played their home games at the Firestone Fieldhouse in Malibu, California as members of the West Coast Conference.

== Previous season ==
The Waves finished the 2023–24 season 13–20, 5–11 in WCC play to finish in a three-way tie for sixth place. As the No. 8 seed in the WCC Tournament, they defeated Pacific in the first round, before losing to San Diego in the second round.

== Offseason ==
=== Departures ===
Name	Number	Pos.	Height	Weight	Year	Hometown	Reason for departure
Houston Mallette	0	G	6'5"	185	Junior	Alameda, CA	Transferred to Alabama
Michael Ajayi	1	G/F	6'7"	220	Junior	Kent, WA	Transferred to Gonzaga
Jalen Pitre	2	F	6'8"	220	Sophomore	Long Beach, CA	Transferred to Sacramento State
Malik Moore	3	G	6'5"	190	Sophomore	Ventura, CA	Transferred to Montana
Paul Jordan	10	F	6'6"	200	(redshirt) Sophomore	Glen Cove, NY	Walk-on; not return
Cord Stansberry	13	G	6'3"	180	(redshirt) Freshman	Long Beach, CA	Transferred to Western Carolina
Jevon Porter	14	F	6'11"	225	Sophomore	Columbia, MO	Transferred to Loyola Marymount
Ethan Anderson	20	G	6'0"	215	GS senior	Los Angeles, CA	Graduated
Nils Cooper	21	G	6'5"	180	Freshman	Los Angeles, CA	Transferred to UC Davis
Curtis Williams	23	G/F	6'6"	180	Freshman	Beaumont, CA	Transferred to Northwest Florida State College
John Squire	24	F	6'8"	220	Freshman	Sausalito, CA	Not on team roster
Martin Gumwel	34	C	6'11"	230	Freshman	Temecula, CA	Not on team roster
Aladji Gassama	35	F/C	6'9"	215	(redshirt) Sophomore	Bamako, Mali	Transferred to Drury

=== Incoming transfers ===
Name	Number	Pos.	Height	Weight	Year	Hometown	Previous school
Aaron Clark	3	G	6'6"	195	Sophomore	Easton, PA	Wake Forest
Alonso Faure	4	F	6'10"	230	GS senior	Busot, Spain	Loyola (MD)
Moe Odum	5	G	6'1"	160	Junior	New York, NY	Pacific
Stefan Todorović	7	F	6'8"	190	Senior	Belgrade, Serbia	San Francisco
Zion Bethea	8	G	6'4"	205	(redshirt) Senior	South Orange, NJ	Delaware
Javon Cooley	23	G	6'5'	205	GS senior	Chicago, IL	Marist
Alex Leiba	24	C	6'10"	245	GS senior	Old Bridge, NJ	Penn State Harrisburg

=== Recruiting classes ===
==== 2024 recruiting class ====
College recruiting
Name	Hometown	School	Height	Weight	Commit date
Taj Au-Duke; PG	Portland, OR	Cali Prep Academy	6 ft 3 in (1.91 m)	N/A	May 22, 2024
Taj Au-Duke; PG	Recruit ratings: Scout: Rivals: 247Sports: ESPN: (NR)				
Overall recruit ranking: Scout: nr Rivals: nr ESPN: nr
Note: In many cases, Scout, Rivals, 247Sports, On3, and ESPN may conflict in their listings of height and weight.; In these cases, the average was taken. ESPN grades are on a 100-point scale.; Sources: "Pepperdine Waves 2024 Basketball Commitments". Rivals.; "2024 Pepperdine Waves Basketball Commits". Scout.; "ESPN 2024 Pepperdine Waves Basketball recruits". ESPN.; "Scout.com Team Recruiting Rankings". Scout.; "2024 Team Ranking". Rivals.

== Roster ==
2024–25 Pepperdine Waves men's basketball team
Players
Coaches

Pos.	#	Name	Height	Weight	Year	Previous school	Hometown
G	1	David Mager (W)	6 ft 3 in (1.91 m)	180 lb (82 kg)	RS So	Dwight-Englewood School	Englewood, NJ
G	2	Stevie Prudholme (W)	6 ft 2 in (1.88 m)	—	Fr	Oaks Christian School	Malibu, CA
G	3	Aaron Clark	6 ft 6 in (1.98 m)	195 lb (88 kg)	So	Brewster Academy; Wake Forest	Easton, PA
F	4	Alonso Faure	6 ft 10 in (2.08 m)	230 lb (104 kg)	GS	IES Fuente San Luis; Loyola (MD)	Busot, Spain
G	5	Moe Odum	6 ft 1 in (1.85 m)	160 lb (73 kg)	Jr	West Oaks Academy (FL); Pacific	New York, NY
F	7	Stefan Todorović	6 ft 8 in (2.03 m)	210 lb (95 kg)	Sr	Prolific Prep; San Francisco	Belgrade, Serbia
G	8	Zion Bethea	6 ft 4 in (1.93 m)	205 lb (93 kg)	RS Sr	Immaculate Conception HS; Delaware	South Orange, NJ
G	9	Taj Au-Duke	6 ft 3 in (1.91 m)	180 lb (82 kg)	Fr	Cali Prep Academy	Scarborough, ON
G	10	Jaxon Olvera (W)	6 ft 5 in (1.96 m)	190 lb (86 kg)	Fr	Golden State Prep	Houston, TX
F	12	Boubacar Coulibaly	6 ft 10 in (2.08 m)	225 lb (102 kg)	RS Sr	San Gabriel Academy; USC	Bamako, Mali
G/F	13	Dovydas Butka	6 ft 9 in (2.06 m)	215 lb (98 kg)	So	BC Žalgiris	Panevėžys, Lithuania
G/F	23	Javon Cooley	6 ft 5 in (1.96 m)	205 lb (93 kg)	GS	St. Rita HS; Marist	Chicago, IL
C	24	Alex Leiba	6 ft 10 in (2.08 m)	240 lb (109 kg)	GS	St. John Vianney HS; Penn State Harrisburg	Old Bridge, NJ
F	35	Danilo Dožić (W)	6 ft 10 in (2.08 m)	215 lb (98 kg)	Fr	Ivanka Gajic JL Bourg U21	Belgrade, Serbia
G	40	Isaac Pratt (W)	6 ft 4 in (1.93 m)	—	Fr	North Central HS	Pasadena, CA
G	42	Isaiah Dean (W)	6 ft 2 in (1.88 m)	—	Fr	Woodside Priory School	San Francisco, CA

Head coach

- Ed Schilling (Miami (OH))

Assistant coach(es)

- Mark Cline (Wake Forest)
- Tyus Edney (UCLA)
- Josh Calbert
- Mike Doig (Clearwater Christian College)
- Jeremy Grubbs (Robert Morris)

Legend

- (C) Team captain
- (S) Suspended
- (I) Ineligible
- (W) Walk-on
- Injured
- Current redshirt

Roster

== Schedule and results ==
Date time, TV	Rank^{#}	Opponent^{#}	Result	Record	High points	High rebounds	High assists	Site city, state
Exhibition
November 2, 2024*; 6:00 p.m., ESPN+		Lincoln (CA)	W 128-67		–	–	–	Firestone Fieldhouse; Malibu, CA
Non conference regular season
November 6, 2024*; 6:00 p.m., ESPN+		Western Illinois	W 77–64	1–0	25 – Todorović	10 – Butka	8 – Odum	Firestone Fieldhouse (801); Malibu, CA
November 9, 2024*; 7:00 p.m., ESPN+		at UC San Diego	L 76–94	1–1	33 – Todorović	7 – Tied	7 – Odum	LionTree Arena (3,688); San Diego, CA
November 16, 2024*; 7:00 p.m., ESPN+		at UC Irvine	L 62–80	1–2	17 – Todorović	6 – Tied	8 – Odum	Bren Events Center (2,123); Irvine, CA
November 20, 2024*; 7:00 p.m., MW Network		at UNLV	L 59–80	1–3	19 – Todorović	8 – Butka	5 – Odum	Thomas & Mack Center (4,544); Paradise, NV
November 22, 2024*; 5:00 p.m., B1G+		at Northwestern; Arizona Tip-Off campus site game	L 50–68	1–4	11 – Olvera	7 – Tied	5 – Odum	Welsh–Ryan Arena (5,853); Evanston, IL
November 26, 2024*; 6:00 p.m., ESPN+		Cal State Fullerton	L 63–72	1–5	16 – Todorović	9 – Todorović	5 – Odum	Firestone Fieldhouse (462); Malibu, CA
November 29, 2024*; 12:30 p.m.		vs. New Mexico State; Arizona Tip-Off Desert Division semifinals	W 82–70	2–5	22 – Todorović	9 – Coulibaly	9 – Odum	Mullett Arena (814); Tempe, AZ
November 30, 2024*; 1:30 p.m.		vs. Weber State; Arizona Tip-Off Desert Division championships	L 53–68	2–6	17 – Coulibaly	11 – Coulibaly	7 – Odum	Mullett Arena (924); Tempe, AZ
December 4, 2024*; 6:00 p.m., ESPN+		Life Pacific	W 119–57	3–6	16 – Tied	10 – Faure	9 – Odum	Firestone Fieldhouse (456); Malibu, CA
December 7, 2024*; 2:00 p.m., ESPN+		Grambling State	W 85–57	4–6	22 – Todorović	13 – Butka	9 – Odum	Firestone Fieldhouse (366); Malibu, CA
December 14, 2024*; 6:00 p.m., ESPN+		Northern Arizona	W 86–76	5–6	22 – Coulibaly	6 – Todorović	8 – Odum	Firestone Fieldhouse (575); Malibu, CA
December 19, 2024*; 6:00 p.m., ESPN+		Long Beach State	L 76–79	5–7	32 – Todorović	11 – Tied	11 – Odum	Firestone Fieldhouse (389); Malibu, CA
December 21, 2024*; 12:00 p.m., ESPN+		UC Davis	W 85–46	6–7	18 – Butka	10 – Butka	5 – Odum	Firestone Fieldhouse (503); Malibu, CA
WCC regular season
December 28, 2024; 4:00 p.m., ESPN+		at Santa Clara	L 80–91	6–8 (0–1)	25 – Todorović	10 – Coulibaly	9 – Odum	Leavey Center (1,133); Santa Clara, CA
December 30, 2024; 7:00 p.m., ESPN+		No. 19 Gonzaga	L 82–89	6–9 (0–2)	27 – Olvera	8 – Tied	8 – Odum	Firestone Fieldhouse (1,506); Malibu, CA
January 2, 2025; 7:00 p.m., ESPN+		at Saint Mary's	L 41–71	6–10 (0–3)	14 – Odum	6 – Tied	4 – Coulibaly	University Credit Union Pavilion (3,391); Moraga, CA
January 4, 2025; 4:00 p.m., ESPN+		at Pacific	W 87–70	7–10 (1–3)	29 – Todorović	8 – Coulibaly	11 – Odum	Alex G. Spanos Center (1,158); Stockton, CA
January 16, 2025; 7:00 p.m., ESPN+		San Francisco	L 63–80	7–11 (1–4)	17 – Coulibaly	7 – Todorović	4 – Odum	Firestone Fieldhouse (248); Malibu, CA
January 18, 2025; 7:00 p.m., ESPN+		Saint Mary's	L 50–74	7–12 (1–5)	16 – Todorović	6 – Todorović	4 – Tied	Firestone Fieldhouse (632); Malibu, CA
January 23, 2025; 6:30 p.m., ESPN+		at Oregon State	L 63–83	7–13 (1–6)	19 – Todorović	9 – Coulibaly	11 – Odum	Gill Coliseum (3,530); Corvallis, OR
January 25, 2025; 7:00 p.m., ESPN+		Pacific	W 60–44	8–13 (2–6)	14 – Todorović	10 – Todorović	5 – Odum	Firestone Fieldhouse (430); Malibu, CA
January 30, 2025; 7:00 p.m., ESPN+		at San Diego	W 98–90	9–13 (3–6)	26 – Bethea	8 – Todorović	9 – Odum	Jenny Craig Pavilion (821); San Diego, CA
February 1, 2025; 7:00 p.m., ESPN+		Portland	L 64–84	9–14 (3–7)	16 – Butka	12 – Butka	3 – Olvera	Firestone Fieldhouse (385); Malibu, CA
February 8, 2025; 3:00 p.m., ESPN+		at Washington State	L 86–87	9–15 (3–8)	30 – Todorović	8 – Coulibaly	11 – Odum	Beasley Coliseum (3,957); Pullman, WA
February 11, 2025; 6:00 p.m., ESPN+		Loyola Marymount; Game rescheduled due to Los Angeles wildfires.	L 60–69	9–16 (3–9)	17 – Todorović	10 – Coulibaly	8 – Odum	Firestone Fieldhouse (320); Malibu, CA
February 13, 2025; 7:00 p.m., ESPN+		San Diego	W 88–81	10–16 (4–9)	24 – Todorović	10 – Coulibaly	8 – Odum	Firestone Fieldhouse (710); Malibu, CA
February 15, 2025; 6:00 p.m., ESPN+		at Gonzaga	L 55–107	10–17 (4–10)	12 – Dožić	8 – Faure	7 – Odum	McCarthey Athletic Center (6,000); Spokane, WA
February 20, 2025; 7:00 p.m., ESPN+		Oregon State	L 78–84	10–18 (4–11)	20 – Coulibaly	11 – Coulibaly	7 – Odum	Firestone Fieldhouse (565); Malibu, CA
February 22, 2025; 6:00 p.m., ESPN+		at Loyola Marymount	L 82–93	10–19 (4–12)	26 – Odum	11 – Butka	6 – Odum	Gersten Pavilion (1,173); Los Angeles, CA
February 27, 2025; 7:00 p.m., ESPN+		at Portland	L 67–87	10–20 (4–13)	18 – Butka	7 – Todorović	8 – Odum	Chiles Center (1,006); Portland, OR
March 1, 2025; 7:00 p.m., ESPN+		Washington State	L 83–90	10–21 (4–14)	22 – Bethea	9 – Butka	11 – Odum	Firestone Fieldhouse (808); Malibu, CA
WCC tournament
March 7, 2025; 6:00 p.m., ESPN+	(9)	vs. (8) Portland; Second round	W 86–73	11–21	31 – Odum	11 – Coulibaly	11 – Odum	Orleans Arena (1,200); Paradise, NV
March 8, 2025; 6:00 p.m., ESPN+	(9)	vs. (5) Oregon State; Third round	W 77–73	12–21	34 – Todorović	6 – Bethea	10 – Odum	Orleans Arena (2,722); Paradise, NV
March 9, 2025; 5:30 p.m., ESPN2	(9)	vs. (4) Santa Clara; Quarterfinal	W 78–76	13–21	19 – Odum	6 – Tied	13 – Odum	Orleans Arena (2,523); Paradise, NV
March 10, 2025; 6:00 p.m., ESPN	(9)	vs. (1) No. 19 Saint Mary's; Semifinal	L 59–74	13–22	19 – Odum	6 – Coulibaly	3 – Odum	Orleans Arena (4,650); Paradise, NV
*Non-conference game. ^{#}Rankings from AP Poll. (#) Tournament seedings in parentheses. All times are in Pacific Time.
