= 2024–25 West Coast Conference men's basketball season =

- League: NCAA Division I
- Sport: Men's basketball
- Teams: 11
- TV partner(s): CBSSN, ESPN, ESPN+

Regular season
- Season champions: Saint Mary’s
- Season MVP: Augustas Marčiulionis, Saint Mary's

Tournament
- Venue: Orleans Arena, Paradise, Nevada
- Champions: Gonzaga
- Runners-up: Saint Mary's
- Finals MVP: Graham Ike, Gonzaga

Basketball seasons
- ← 2023–24 2025–26 →

2024–25 West Coast Conference men's basketball standings
	Conf.				Overall
Team	W		L	PCT	W		L	PCT
No. 24 Saint Mary's	17	–	1	.944	29	–	6	.829
No. 23 Gonzaga †	14	–	4	.778	26	–	9	.743
San Francisco	13	–	5	.722	25	–	10	.714
Santa Clara	12	–	6	.667	21	–	13	.618
Oregon State	10	–	8	.556	20	–	13	.606
Washington State	8	–	10	.444	19	–	15	.559
Loyola Marymount	8	–	10	.444	17	–	15	.531
Portland	7	–	11	.389	12	–	20	.375
Pepperdine	4	–	14	.222	13	–	22	.371
Pacific	4	–	14	.222	9	–	24	.273
San Diego	2	–	16	.111	6	–	27	.182
† 2025 WCC tournament winner Rankings from AP poll

The 2024–25 West Coast Conference men's basketball season began with practices in September 2024 and will end with the 2025 West Coast Conference men's basketball tournament in March 2025. This will be the 74th season for WCC men's basketball, and the 36th under its current name of "West Coast Conference". The conference was founded in 1952 as the California Basketball Association, became the West Coast Athletic Conference in 1956, and dropped the word "Athletic" in 1989.

This season marks the first season of a two-year term for Oregon State and Washington State, who join as temporary affiliate members due to the temporary hiatus of the Pac-12. They, alongside Gonzaga will leave for the Pac-12 in the 2026–27 season.

== Head coaches ==
=== Coaching Changes ===
Three new head coaches will lead their team in the WCC during the 2024–25 season.

==== Pacific ====
On March 4, 2024, head coach Leonard Perry was relieved of his duties after three seasons. On March 27, the school named Dave Smart the team's new head coach. He was notably the Head Coach of Carleton for 19 seasons, winning 13 U Sports basketball titles.

==== Pepperdine ====
On March 4, 2024, head coach Lorenzo Romar was fired after six seasons. On April 2, Ed Schilling was named by the school as the team's next head coach. He was previously an assistant for four seasons at Grand Canyon.

==== Washington State ====
Following the season, head coach Kyle Smith was named the head coach at Stanford. On April 2, 2024, David Riley was named as the team's next head coach. He was previously the head coach at Eastern Washington.

=== Coaches ===
Team	Head coach	Previous job	Years at school	Overall record	WCC record	WCC Tournament record	NCAA Tournaments	Sweet Sixteens
Gonzaga	Mark Few	Gonzaga (asst.)	26	716–143 (.834)	347–36 (.906)	45–5 (.900)	24	13
Loyola Marymount	Stan Johnson	Marquette (asst.)	5	55–58 (.487)	24–35 (.407)	2–4 (.333)	0	0
Oregon State	Wayne Tinkle	Grand Canyon (asst.)	11	140–177 (.442)	0-0 (–)	0–0 (–)	2	1
Pacific	Dave Smart	Texas Tech (asst.)	1	0–0 (–)	0–0 (–)	0–0 (–)	0	0
Pepperdine	Ed Schilling	Grand Canyon (asst.)	1	0–0 (–)	0-0 (–)	0–0 (–)	0	0
Portland	Shantay Legans	Eastern Washington	4	45–55 (.450)	17–29 (.370)	3–3 (.500)	1	0
Saint Mary's	Randy Bennett	Saint Louis (asst.)	24	533–216 (.712)	271–96 (.738)	29–19 (.604)	10	1
San Diego	Steve Lavin	St. John's	3	29–35 (.453)	11–21 (.250)	1–2 (.333)	8	4
San Francisco	Chris Gerlufsen	San Francisco (asst.)	3	43–25 (.632)	18–14 (.563)	3–2 (.600)	0	0
Santa Clara	Herb Sendek	Arizona State	8	140–107 (.567)	67–57 (.540)	6–8 (.429)	8	1
Washington State	David Riley	Eastern Washington	1	0–0 (–)	0-0 (–)	0–0 (–)	0	0

Notes:

- Year at school includes 2024–25 season.
- Overall and WCC records are from time at current school and are through the beginning of the 2024–25 season.

== Preseason ==
=== Preseason poll ===
2024-25 WCC Preseason Men's Basketball Coaches Poll
Rank	Team (First Place Votes)	Points
1.	Gonzaga (9)	99
2.	Saint Mary's (1)	86
3.	Santa Clara	81
4.	San Francisco (1)	77
5.	Washington State	62
6.	Loyola Marymount	60
7.	Oregon State	44
T-8.	Portland	28
T-8.	San Diego	28
10.	Pacific	23
11.	Pepperdine	17

=== All-WCC Preseason Men's Basketball team ===
Honor	Recipient
Preseason All-WCC Team	Michael Ajayi, Gonzaga
Preseason All-WCC Team	Adama-Alpha Bal, Santa Clara
Preseason All-WCC Team	Cedric Coward, Washington State
Preseason All-WCC Team	Nolan Hickman, Gonzaga
Preseason All-WCC Team	Graham Ike, Gonzaga
Preseason All-WCC Team	Augustas Marciulionis, Saint Mary's
Preseason All-WCC Team	Ryan Nembhard, Gonzaga
Preseason All-WCC Team	Jevon Porter, LMU
Preseason All-WCC Team	Mitchell Saxen, Saint Mary's
Preseason All-WCC Team	Carlos Stewart Jr., Santa Clara
Preseason All-WCC Team	Marcus Williams, San Francisco

== Rankings ==
*AP does not release post-NCAA tournament rankings

	Improvement in ranking
	Drop in ranking
RV	Received votes but were not ranked in Top 25
NV	No votes received

		Pre	Wk 1	Wk 2	Wk 3	Wk 4	Wk 5	Wk 6	Wk 7	Wk 8	Wk 9	Wk 10	Wk 11	Wk 12	Wk 13	Wk 14	Wk 15	Wk 16	Wk 17	Wk 18	Wk 19	Final
Gonzaga	AP	6 (1)	4 (3)	3 (2)	3 (2)	7	8	13	14	19	18	16	RV	RV	RV	RV	RV	RV	RV	RV	24	23
Gonzaga	C	7	5 (1)	4 (1)	4 (1)	8	9	14	15	19	18	16	RV	RV	RV	RV	RV	RV	RV	RV	23	20
Loyola Marymount	AP																					
Loyola Marymount	C																					
Oregon State	AP																					
Oregon State	C																					
Pacific	AP																					
Pacific	C																					
Pepperdine	AP																					
Pepperdine	C																					
Portland	AP																					
Portland	C																					
Saint Mary's	AP	RV			RV	RV	RV					RV	RV	RV	RV	RV	RV	23	21	19	20	24
Saint Mary's	C	RV	RV	RV	RV	RV	RV					RV	RV	RV	23	RV	24	20	17	15	19	22
San Diego	AP																					
San Diego	C																					
San Francisco	AP																					
San Francisco	C			RV																		
Santa Clara	AP																					
Santa Clara	C																					
Washington State	AP																					
Washington State	C																					

== Regular season ==
=== Early season tournaments ===
The following table summarizes the multiple-team events (MTE) or early season tournaments in which teams from the West Coast Conference will participate.

Team	Tournament	Dates	Result
Gonzaga	Battle 4 Atlantis	November 27–29	5th
Loyola Marymount	Cancún Challenge	November 26–27	1st
Oregon State	Diamond Head Classic	December 22–25	2nd
Pacific	Missouri MTE	November 22–27	–
Pepperdine	Arizona Tip-Off	November 29–30	2nd
Portland	Myrtle Beach Invitational	November 21–24	8th
Saint Mary's	Acrisure Classic	November 28–29	2nd
San Diego	San Diego MTE	November 22–24	–
San Francisco	Sunshine Slam	November 25–26	3rd
Santa Clara	Acrisure Invitational	November 28–29	2nd
Washington State	Acrisure Holiday Invitational	November 28–29	2nd

== Postseason ==
=== WCC Tournament ===
First round Thursday, March 6
10	Pacific	77
11	San Diego	81

Second round Friday, March 7
8	Portland	73
9	Pepperdine	86
7	Loyola Marymount	100
11	San Diego	74

Third round Saturday, March 8
5	Oregon State	73
9	Pepperdine	77
6	Washington State	94
7	Loyola Marymount	77

Quarterfinals; Sunday, March 9
4	Santa Clara	76
9	Pepperdine	78
3	San Francisco	86
6	Washington State	75

Semifinals; Monday, March 10
1	Saint Mary’s	74
9	Pepperdine	59
2	Gonzaga	85
3	San Francisco	76

Championship; Tuesday, March 11
1	Saint Mary’s	51
2	Gonzaga	58

=== NCAA Tournament ===
Seed	Region	School	First round	Second round	Sweet 16	Elite Eight	Final Four	Championship
8	Midwest	Gonzaga	Defeated (9) Georgia, 89–68	Lost to (1) Houston, 76–81	DNP			
7	East	Saint Mary's	Defeated (10) Vanderbilt, 59–56	Lost to (2) Alabama, 66–80	DNP			
	Bids	W-L (%):	2–0 (1.000)	0–2 (.000)	0–0 (–)	0–0 (–)	0–0 (–)	TOTAL: 2–2 (.500)

=== NIT ===
Seed	School	First round	Second round	Quarterfinals	Semifinals	Final
1	San Francisco	Defeated Utah Valley, 79–70	Lost to Loyola Chicago, 76–77	DNP		
2	Santa Clara	Defeated UC Riverside, 101–62	Lost to UAB, 84–88	DNP		
	W-L (%):	0–1 (1.000)	0–0 (.000)	0–0 (–)	0–0 (–)	TOTAL: 2–2 (.500)

=== CBC ===
School	First round	Second round	Semifinals	Finals
Washington State	Lost to Georgetown, 82–85	DNP		
Oregon State	Lost to UCF, 75–76	DNP		
W–L (%):	0–2 (.000)	0–0 (–)	0–0 (–)	0–0 (–)
Total: 0–2 (.000)

== All-WCC Awards and Teams ==
On March 4, 2025, the West Coast Conference announced the following awards:

Honor	Recipient	School
Player of the Year	Augustas Marčiulionis	Saint Mary's
Coach of the Year	Randy Bennett	Saint Mary's
Defensive Player of the Year	Mitchell Saxen	Saint Mary's
Newcomer of the Year	Paulius Murauskas	Saint Mary's
Sixth Man of the Year	Mikey Lewis	Saint Mary's
Freshman of the Year	Austin Rapp	Portland
All-WCC First Team	Adama-Alpha Bal	Santa Clara
All-WCC First Team	Nolan Hickman	Gonzaga
All-WCC First Team	Graham Ike	Gonzaga
All-WCC First Team	Augustas Marčiulionis	Saint Mary's
All-WCC First Team	Paulius Murauskas	Saint Mary's
All-WCC First Team	Ryan Nembhard	Gonzaga
All-WCC First Team	Michael Rataj	Oregon State
All-WCC First Team	Mitchell Saxen	Saint Mary's
All-WCC First Team	Malik Thomas	San Francisco
All-WCC First Team	Marcus Williams	San Francisco
All-WCC Second Team	Parsa Fallah	Oregon State
All-WCC Second Team	Max Mackinnon	Portland
All-WCC Second Team	Carlos Stewart Jr.	Santa Clara
All-WCC Second Team	Christoph Tilly	Santa Clara
All-WCC Second Team	Lamar Washington	Pacific
All-WCC Freshman Team	Tony Duckett	San Diego
All-WCC Freshman Team	Mikey Lewis	Saint Mary's
All-WCC Freshman Team	Austin Rapp	Portland
All-WCC Freshman Team	Tyrone Riley IV	San Francisco
All-WCC Freshman Team	Tómas Valur Þrastarson	Washington State
WCC Honorable Mention	Luke Barrett	Saint Mary's
WCC Honorable Mention	Nate Calmese	Washington State
WCC Honorable Mention	Nate Kingz	Oregon State
WCC Honorable Mention	Jevon Porter	LMU
WCC Honorable Mention	Caleb Stone-Carrawell	LMU
WCC Honorable Mention	Stefan Todorovic	Pepperdine
WCC Honorable Mention	Lejuan Watts	Washington State
