= 2024–25 Gonzaga Bulldogs men's basketball team =

American college basketball season

2024–25 Gonzaga Bulldogs men's basketball

WCC tournament champions

NCAA tournament, Second Round
- Conference: West Coast Conference

Ranking
- Coaches: No. 20
- AP: No. 23
- Record: 26–9 (14–4 WCC)
- Head coach: Mark Few (26th season)
- Assistant coaches: Brian Michaelson (12th season); Stephen Gentry (4th season); R-Jay Barsh (2nd season); Zach Norvell Jr. (2nd season)
- Home arena: McCarthey Athletic Center

2024–25 West Coast Conference men's basketball standings
	Conf.				Overall
Team	W		L	PCT	W		L	PCT
No. 24 Saint Mary's	17	–	1	.944	29	–	6	.829
No. 23 Gonzaga †	14	–	4	.778	26	–	9	.743
San Francisco	13	–	5	.722	25	–	10	.714
Santa Clara	12	–	6	.667	21	–	13	.618
Oregon State	10	–	8	.556	20	–	13	.606
Washington State	8	–	10	.444	19	–	15	.559
Loyola Marymount	8	–	10	.444	17	–	15	.531
Portland	7	–	11	.389	12	–	20	.375
Pepperdine	4	–	14	.222	13	–	22	.371
Pacific	4	–	14	.222	9	–	24	.273
San Diego	2	–	16	.111	6	–	27	.182
† 2025 WCC tournament winner Rankings from AP poll

The 2024–25 Gonzaga Bulldogs men's basketball team represented Gonzaga University, located in Spokane, Washington, in the 2024–25 NCAA Division I men's basketball season. The team, also unofficially nicknamed the "Zags", was led by head coach Mark Few, in his 26th season as head coach, and played home games at the on-campus McCarthey Athletic Center as members of the West Coast Conference (WCC).

== Previous season ==
The Bulldogs finished the 2023–24 season 27–8, 14–2 in WCC play to finish in second place, failing to win at least a share of the regular season title for the first time since 2012. As the No. 2 seed in the WCC Tournament, they defeated San Francisco in the semifinals, before losing to Saint Mary's in the championship. They received an at-large bid to the NCAA Tournament where as the No. 5 seed in the Midwest region, they defeated McNeese in the First Round and Kansas in the Second Round to reach their ninth consecutive Sweet Sixteen, where they lost to Purdue.

== Offseason ==
=== Departures ===
Gonzaga Bulldogs Departures
Name	Number	Pos.	Height	Weight	Year	Hometown	Reason for departure
Anton Watson	22	F	6'8"	228	Graduate	Spokane, WA	Graduated; declared for 2024 NBA draft; selected 54th overall by the Boston Celtics
Colby Brooks	25	F	6'7"	215	(redshirt) Junior	Los Angeles, CA	Walk-on; transferred to San Diego
Luka Krajnović	3	G	6'5"	185	Freshman	Zagreb, Croatia	Signed with KK Cedevita Junior of the Premijer liga
Pavle Stošić	14	F	6'9"	196	Freshman	Niš, Serbia	Transferred to Utah State

=== Incoming transfers ===
Gonzaga incoming transfers
Name	Number	Pos.	Height	Weight	Year	Hometown	Previous School
Michael Ajayi	1	G	6'7"	220	Senior	Kent, WA	Pepperdine
Khalif Battle	99	G	6'5"	185	Graduate	Hillside, NJ	Arkansas
Emmanuel Innocenti	5	F	6'5"	198	Sophomore	Ranzanico, Italy	Tarleton State
Braeden Smith	3	G	6'0"	180	Junior	Seattle, WA	Colgate

=== Recruiting classes ===
==== 2024 recruiting class ====
College recruiting
Name	Hometown	School	Height	Weight	Commit date
Ismaila Diagne; C	Nguékhokh, Senegal	Real Madrid	7 ft 0 in (2.13 m)	237 lb (108 kg)	Jun 4, 2024
Ismaila Diagne; C	Recruit ratings: Rivals: 247Sports: ESPN: (NR)				
Overall recruit ranking:
Note: In many cases, Scout, Rivals, 247Sports, On3, and ESPN may conflict in their listings of height and weight.; In these cases, the average was taken. ESPN grades are on a 100-point scale.; Sources: "Gonzaga 2024 Basketball Commitments". Rivals.; "2024 Gonzaga Bulldogs Recruiting Class". ESPN.; "2024 Team Ranking". Rivals.

==== 2025 recruiting class ====
College recruiting (2025)
Name	Hometown	School	Height	Weight	Commit date
Davis Fogle #7 SF	Anacortes, WA	Compass Prep	6 ft 7 in (2.01 m)	185 lb (84 kg)	Jul 4, 2024
Davis Fogle #7 SF	Recruit ratings: Rivals: 247Sports: ESPN: (87)				
Parker Jefferson #40 C	Inglewood, CA	Inglewood	6 ft 9 in (2.06 m)	230 lb (100 kg)	May 2, 2025
Parker Jefferson #40 C	Recruit ratings: Rivals: 247Sports: ESPN: (82)				
Overall recruit ranking:
Note: In many cases, Scout, Rivals, 247Sports, On3, and ESPN may conflict in their listings of height and weight.; In these cases, the average was taken. ESPN grades are on a 100-point scale.; Sources: "Gonzaga 2025 Basketball Commitments". Rivals.; "2025 Gonzaga Bulldogs Recruiting Class". ESPN.; "2025 Team Ranking". Rivals.

== Roster ==
Note: Players' year is based on remaining eligibility. The NCAA did not count the 2020–21 season towards eligibility.

2024–25 Gonzaga Bulldogs men's basketball team
Players
Coaches

Pos.	#	Name	Height	Weight	Year	Previous school	Hometown
G	99	Khalif Battle	6 ft 5 in (1.96 m)	185 lb (84 kg)	GS	Arkansas	Hillside, NJ
F	13	Graham Ike	6 ft 9 in (2.06 m)	250 lb (113 kg)	RS Sr	Wyoming	Aurora, CO
F	33	Ben Gregg	6 ft 10 in (2.08 m)	230 lb (104 kg)	Sr	Clackamas	Clackamas, OR
G	11	Nolan Hickman	6 ft 2 in (1.88 m)	190 lb (86 kg)	Sr	Wasatch Academy	Seattle, WA
G	15	Joe Few (W)	6 ft 0 in (1.83 m)	170 lb (77 kg)	Sr	Gonzaga Prep	Spokane, WA
G	0	Ryan Nembhard	6 ft 0 in (1.83 m)	180 lb (82 kg)	Sr	Creighton	Aurora, ON
G	1	Michael Ajayi	6 ft 7 in (2.01 m)	228 lb (103 kg)	Sr	Pepperdine	Kent, WA
G	2	Steele Venters (injured)	6 ft 7 in (2.01 m)	200 lb (91 kg)	RS Jr	Eastern Washington	Ellensburg, WA
F	35	Noah Haaland (W)	6 ft 9 in (2.06 m)	245 lb (111 kg)	RS Jr	Allan Hancock	Rathdrum, ID
F	22	Jun Seok Yeo	6 ft 8 in (2.03 m)	218 lb (99 kg)	Jr	Korea University	Seoul, South Korea
G	3	Braeden Smith (redshirt)	6 ft 0 in (1.83 m)	170 lb (77 kg)	Jr	Colgate	Seattle, WA
F	34	Braden Huff	6 ft 10 in (2.08 m)	250 lb (113 kg)	RS So	Glenbard West	Glen Ellyn, IL
G	4	Dusty Stromer	6 ft 6 in (1.98 m)	200 lb (91 kg)	So	Notre Dame HS	Sherman Oaks, CA
F	5	Emmanuel Innocenti	6 ft 5 in (1.96 m)	198 lb (90 kg)	So	Tarleton State	Ranzanico, Italy
G	10	Joaquim ArauzMoore (W)	6 ft 1 in (1.85 m)	175 lb (79 kg)	RS Fr	Branson	Ross, CA
G	7	Cade Orness (W) (redshirt)	6 ft 3 in (1.91 m)	185 lb (84 kg)	Fr	North Kitsap	Poulsbo, WA
C	24	Ismaila Diagne	7 ft 0 in (2.13 m)	237 lb (108 kg)	Fr	Real Madrid	Nguékhokh, Senegal
F	14	Graydon Lemke (W) (redshirt)	6 ft 10 in (2.08 m)	190 lb (86 kg)	Fr	Faith Lutheran	Las Vegas, NV

Head coach

- Mark Few (Oregon)

Assistant coach(es)

- Brian Michaelson (Gonzaga)
- Stephen Gentry (Gonzaga)
- R-Jay Barsh (Puget Sound)
- Zach Norvell Jr. (Gonzaga)

Legend

- (C) Team captain
- (S) Suspended
- (I) Ineligible
- (W) Walk-on
- Injured
- Current redshirt

Roster
Last update: August 27, 2024

- Roster is subject to change as/if players transfer or leave the program for other reasons.

=== Depth chart ===
Pos.	Starting 5	Bench 1	Bench 2	Bench 3
C	Graham Ike	Ben Gregg	Ismaila Diagne	Graydon Lemke
PF	Braden Huff	Michael Ajayi		Noah Haaland
SF	Khalif Battle	Emmanuel Innocenti	Jun Seok Yeo
SG	Nolan Hickman	Dusty Stromer	Joe Few
PG	Ryan Nembhard			Joaquim ArauzMoore

== Schedule and results ==
Date time, TV	Rank^{#}	Opponent^{#}	Result	Record	High points	High rebounds	High assists	Site (attendance) city, state
Exhibition
October 26, 2024*; 5:00 p.m., B1G+	No. 6	vs. USC; Charity Game to support Eisenhower Health	L 93–96		20 – Battle	9 – Huff	8 – Nembhard	Acrisure Arena (2,190); Palm Desert, CA
October 30, 2024*; 6:00 p.m., KHQ	No. 6	Warner Pacific	W 109–52		–	–	–	McCarthey Athletic Center; Spokane, WA
Non-conference regular season
November 4, 2024*; 8:30 p.m., ESPN2	No. 6	vs. No. 8 Baylor; Findlay Auto Tip-Off	W 101−63	1−0	17 – Hickman	8 – Tied	11 – Nembhard	Spokane Arena (12,000); Spokane, WA
November 10, 2024*; 2:00 p.m., ESPN	No. 6	Arizona State	W 88−80	2−0	21 – Huff	12 – Ajayi	11 – Nembhard	McCarthey Athletic Center (6,000); Spokane, WA
November 15, 2024*; 6:00 p.m., KHQ/ESPN+	No. 4	UMass Lowell	W 113–54	3–0	21 – Battle	10 – Gregg	8 – Nembhard	McCarthey Athletic Center (6,000); Spokane, WA
November 18, 2024*; 7:00 p.m., CBSSN	No. 3	at San Diego State	W 80–67	4–0	23 – Ike	9 – Ike	10 – Nembhard	Viejas Arena (12,414); San Diego, CA
November 20, 2024*; 6:00 pm, KHQ/ESPN+	No. 3	Long Beach State	W 84–41	5–0	15 – Tied	7 – Gregg	7 – Nembhard	McCarthey Athletic Center (6,000); Spokane, WA
November 27, 2024*; 11:30 a.m., ESPN	No. 3	vs. West Virginia; Battle 4 Atlantis quarterfinals	L 78–86 ^{OT}	5–1	19 – Huff	6 – Gregg	12 – Nembhard	Imperial Arena (959); Paradise Island, Bahamas
November 28, 2024*; 11:30 a.m., ESPN2	No. 3	vs. No. 14 Indiana; Battle 4 Atlantis consolation 2nd round	W 89–73	6–1	16 – Battle	9 – Ajayi	13 – Nembhard	Imperial Arena (2,885); Paradise Island, Bahamas
November 29, 2024*; 5:30 p.m., ESPN2	No. 3	vs. Davidson; Battle 4 Atlantis 5th place game	W 90–65	7–1	24 – Gregg	10 – Ike	14 – Nembhard	Imperial Arena (993); Paradise Island, Bahamas
December 7, 2024*; 7:00 p.m., ESPN2	No. 7	vs. No. 4 Kentucky; Battle in Seattle	L 89–90 ^{OT}	7–2	28 – Ike	11 – Ike	10 – Nembhard	Climate Pledge Arena (17,846); Seattle, WA
December 14, 2024*; 5:00 p.m., FOX	No. 8	vs. No. 18 UConn; Hall of Fame Series New York City	L 71–77	7–3	21 – Battle	6 – Tied	7 – Nembhard	Madison Square Garden (18,933); New York City, NY
December 18, 2024*; 6:00 p.m., KHQ/ESPN+	No. 13	Nicholls	W 102–72	8–3	25 – Huff	10 – Gregg	10 – Nembhard	McCarthey Athletic Center (6,000); Spokane, WA
December 21, 2024*; 6:00 p.m., KHQ/ESPN+	No. 13	Bucknell	W 86–65	9–3	25 – Ike	10 – Ike	9 – Nembhard	McCarthey Athletic Center (6,000); Spokane, WA
December 28, 2024*; 1:00 p.m., FOX	No. 14	vs. No. 22 UCLA; West Coast Hoops Showdown	L 62–65	9–4	24 – Ike	8 – Ike	8 – Nembhard	Intuit Dome (12,272); Inglewood, CA
WCC regular season
December 30, 2024; 7:00 p.m., KHQ/ESPN+	No. 19	at Pepperdine	W 89–82	10–4 (1–0)	21 – Battle	9 – Ike	5 – Hickman	Firestone Fieldhouse (1,506); Malibu, CA
January 2, 2025; 6:00 p.m., KHQ/ESPN+	No. 19	vs. Portland; Community Cancer Fund Classic	W 81–50	11–4 (2–0)	13 – Hickman	15 – Ajayi	9 – Nembhard	Spokane Arena (9,022); Spokane, WA
January 4, 2025; 6:00 p.m., KHQ/ESPN+	No. 19	at Loyola Marymount	W 96–68	12–4 (3–0)	27 – Ike	9 – Ike	11 – Nembhard	Gersten Pavilion (2,369); Los Angeles, CA
January 8, 2025; 6:00 p.m., KHQ/ESPN+	No. 18	San Diego	W 93–80	13–4 (4–0)	23 – Gregg	19 – Ike	11 – Nembhard	McCarthey Athletic Center (6,000); Spokane, WA
January 11, 2025; 6:00 p.m., KHQ/ESPN+	No. 18	Washington State; Rivalry	W 88–75	14–4 (5–0)	21 – Ike	9 – Gregg	5 – Tied	McCarthey Athletic Center (6,000); Spokane, WA
January 16, 2025; 8:00 p.m., CBSSN	No. 16	at Oregon State	L 89–97 ^{OT}	14–5 (5–1)	26 – Ike	13 – Gregg	10 – Nembhard	Gill Coliseum (9,301); Corvallis, OR
January 18, 2025; 6:00 p.m., KHQ/ESPN+	No. 16	Santa Clara	L 99–103	14–6 (5–2)	24 – Hickman	8 – Gregg	15 – Nembhard	McCarthey Athletic Center (6,000); Spokane, WA
January 25, 2025; 5:00 p.m., KHQ/ESPN+		at Portland	W 105–62	15–6 (6–2)	24 – Gregg	8 – Ajayi	13 – Nembhard	Chiles Center (4,117); Portland, OR
January 28, 2025; 8:00 p.m., ESPN2		Oregon State	W 98–60	16–6 (7–2)	23 – Battle	10 – Ajayi	9 – Nembhard	McCarthey Athletic Center (6,000); Spokane, WA
February 1, 2025; 8:00 p.m., ESPN		at Saint Mary's; Rivalry	L 58–62	16–7 (7–3)	24 – Ike	8 – Ike	12 – Nembhard	University Credit Union Pavilion (3,500); Moraga, CA
February 6, 2025; 6:00 p.m., KHQ/ESPN+		Loyola Marymount	W 73–53	17–7 (8–3)	24 – Battle	10 – Ike	9 – Nembhard	McCarthey Athletic Center (6,000); Spokane, WA
February 8, 2025; 4:00 p.m., KHQ/ESPN+		at Pacific	W 78–61	18–7 (9–3)	17 – Huff	9 – Ajayi	8 – Nembhard	Alex G. Spanos Center (3,176); Stockton, CA
February 13, 2025; 8:00 p.m., ESPN		San Francisco	W 88–77	19–7 (10–3)	18 – Tied	13 – Ike	12 – Nembhard	McCarthey Athletic Center (6.000); Spokane, WA
February 15, 2025; 6:00 p.m., KHQ/ESPN+		Pepperdine	W 107–55	20–7 (11–3)	24 – Battle	9 – Ike	11 – Nembhard	McCarthey Athletic Center (6,000); Spokane, WA
February 19, 2025; 6:00 p.m., ESPN2		at Washington State; Rivalry	W 84–63	21–7 (12–3)	23 – Hickman	13 – Ike	5 – Hickman	Beasley Coliseum (10,219); Pullman, WA
February 22, 2025; 5:00 p.m., ESPN2		Saint Mary's; Rivalry	L 67–74	21–8 (12–4)	19 – Ike	5 – Ike	8 – Nembhard	McCarthey Athletic Center (6,000); Spokane, WA
February 25, 2025; 8:00 p.m., CBSSN		at Santa Clara	W 95–76	22–8 (13–4)	24 – Ike	8 – Ajayi	15 – Nembhard	Leavey Center (4,200); Santa Clara, CA
March 1, 2025; 8:00 p.m., ESPN		at San Francisco	W 95–75	23–8 (14–4)	23 – Gregg	8 – Gregg	15 – Nembhard	Chase Center (6,374); San Francisco, CA
WCC Tournament
March 10, 2025; 8:30 p.m., ESPN2	(2)	vs. (3) San Francisco; Semifinals	W 85–76	24–8	27 – Ike	10 – Ike	8 – Nembhard	Orleans Arena (6,217); Paradise, NV
March 11, 2025; 6:00 p.m., ESPN	(2)	vs. (1) No. 19 Saint Mary's; Championship	W 58–51	25–8	18 – Huff	7 – Ike	6 – Nembhard	Orleans Arena (6,237); Paradise, NV
NCAA tournament
March 20, 2025*; 1:35 p.m., TBS	(8 MW) No. 24	vs. (9 MW) Georgia; First Round	W 89–68	26–8	24 – Battle	8 – Tied	8 – Nembhard	Intrust Bank Arena (14,355); Wichita, KS
March 22, 2025*; 5:40 p.m., TNT	(8 MW) No. 24	vs. (1 MW) No. 2 Houston; Second Round	L 76–81	26–9	27 – Ike	6 – Battle	11 – Nembhard	Intrust Bank Arena (14,168); Wichita, KS
*Non-conference game. ^{#}Rankings from AP Poll. (#) Tournament seedings in parentheses. MW=Midwest. All times are in Pacific Time.

== Rankings ==
Ranking movements Legend: ██ Increase in ranking ██ Decrease in ranking RV = Received votes ( ) = First-place votes
	Week																				
Poll	Pre	1	2	3	4	5	6	7	8	9	10	11	12	13	14	15	16	17	18	19	Final
AP	6 (1)	4 (3)	3 (2)	3 (2)	7	8	13	14	19	18	16	RV	RV	RV	RV	RV	RV	RV	RV	24	23
Coaches	7	5 (1)	4 (1)	4 (1)	8	9	14	15	19	18	16	RV	RV	RV	RV	RV	RV	RV	RV	23	20

== See also ==
- 2024–25 Gonzaga Bulldogs women's basketball team
