= Marlon Stewart =

Marlon Stewart may refer to:

- Marlon Stewart (basketball player) (born 1997), American basketball player
- Marlon Stewart (basketball coach) (born 1985), American basketball coach
