= 2024–25 Oregon State Beavers men's basketball team =

American college basketball season

2024–25 Oregon State Beavers men's basketball

College Basketball Crown, First Round
- Conference: West Coast Conference
- Record: 20–13 (10–8 WCC)
- Head coach: Wayne Tinkle (11th season)
- Assistant coaches: Marlon Stewart (6th season); Stephen Thompson (10th season); Chris Haslam (1st season)
- Home arena: Gill Coliseum

2024–25 West Coast Conference men's basketball standings
	Conf.				Overall
Team	W		L	PCT	W		L	PCT
No. 24 Saint Mary's	17	–	1	.944	29	–	6	.829
No. 23 Gonzaga †	14	–	4	.778	26	–	9	.743
San Francisco	13	–	5	.722	25	–	10	.714
Santa Clara	12	–	6	.667	21	–	13	.618
Oregon State	10	–	8	.556	20	–	13	.606
Washington State	8	–	10	.444	19	–	15	.559
Loyola Marymount	8	–	10	.444	17	–	15	.531
Portland	7	–	11	.389	12	–	20	.375
Pepperdine	4	–	14	.222	13	–	22	.371
Pacific	4	–	14	.222	9	–	24	.273
San Diego	2	–	16	.111	6	–	27	.182
† 2025 WCC tournament winner Rankings from AP poll

The 2024–25 Oregon State Beavers men's basketball team represented Oregon State University in the 2024–25 NCAA Division I men's basketball season. The Beavers, led by eleventh-year head coach Wayne Tinkle, played their home games at Gill Coliseum in Corvallis, Oregon, as first year associate members of the West Coast Conference.

== Previous season ==
The Beavers finished the 2023–24 season 13–19, 5–15 in Pac-12 play to finish in last place. They lost to UCLA in the first round of the Pac-12 tournament.

== Off-season ==
=== Departures ===
Name	Num	Pos.	Height	Weight	Year	Hometown	Reason for departure
Jordan Pope	0	G	6'2"	165	Sophomore	Oakley, CA	Transferred to Texas
Christian Wright	1	G	6'3"	185	Junior	Alpharetta, GA	Transferred to Louisiana
Dexter Akanno	4	G/F	6'5"	210	(redshirt) Senior	Valencia, CA	Graduate transferred to Utah State
Justin Rochelin	5	G	6'5"	205	(redshirt) Sophomore	Encino, CA	Transferred to UC San Diego
Jayden Stevens	14	F	6'7"	190	Sophomore	Spokane, WA	Transferred to Idaho
Chol Marial	15	C	7'2"	235	(redshirt) Senior	Rumbek, South Sudan	Graduate transferred to San Jose State
Felipe Palazzo	23	F	6'4"	200	Sophomore	San Miguel de Tucumán, Argentina	Walk-on; left the team
KC Ibekwe	24	C	6'10"	287	Sophomore	Coquitlam, BC	Transferred to Washington
Tyler Bilodeau	34	F	6'9"	220	Sophomore	Kennewick, WA	Transferred to UCLA

=== Incoming transfers ===
Name	Num	Pos.	Height	Weight	Year	Hometown	Previous school
Demarco Minor	0	G	6'0"	180	Senior	Chicago, IL	SIU Edwardsville
Parsa Fallah	11	F	6'9"	250	(redshirt) Junior	Amol, Iran	Southern Utah
Isaiah Sy	13	G	6'7"	185	Sophomore	Marseille, France	Cloud County
Matthew Marsh	15	C	7'1"	240	Senior	Cornwall, England	Wake Forest

=== 2024 recruiting class ===
College recruiting
Name	Hometown	School	Height	Weight	Commit date
Ja'Quavis Williford; SF	Los Angeles, CA	Middlebrooks Academy	6 ft 6 in (1.98 m)	180 lb (82 kg)	Apr 26, 2024
Ja'Quavis Williford; SF	Recruit ratings: Rivals: 247Sports: ESPN: (NR)				
Johan Munch; PF	Denmark	N/A	6 ft 11 in (2.11 m)	200 lb (91 kg)	Jun 23, 2024
Johan Munch; PF	Recruit ratings: Rivals: 247Sports: ESPN: (NR)				
Liutauras Lelevicius; SF	Lithuania	N/A	6 ft 7 in (2.01 m)	200 lb (91 kg)	Jul 26, 2024
Liutauras Lelevicius; SF	Recruit ratings: Rivals: 247Sports: ESPN: (NR)				
Maxim Logue; PF	France	N/A	6 ft 9 in (2.06 m)	215 lb (98 kg)	Sep 6, 2024
Maxim Logue; PF	Recruit ratings: Rivals: 247Sports: ESPN: (NR)				
Overall recruit ranking:
Note: In many cases, Scout, Rivals, 247Sports, On3, and ESPN may conflict in their listings of height and weight.; In these cases, the average was taken. ESPN grades are on a 100-point scale.; Sources: "2024 Basketball Player Commits". ESPN.; "2024 Team Ranking". Rivals.

== Roster ==
2024–25 Oregon State Beavers men's basketball team
Players
Coaches

Pos.	#	Name	Height	Weight	Year	Previous school	Hometown
G	0	Damarco Minor	6 ft 0 in (1.83 m)	190 lb (86 kg)	Sr	SIU Edwardsville	Chicago, Iliinois
G	1	Ja'Quavis Williford	6 ft 7 in (2.01 m)	180 lb (82 kg)	Fr	Red Rock Academy	Tampa Bay, Florida
G	2	Josiah Lake II (W)	6 ft 2 in (1.88 m)	175 lb (79 kg)	So	Tualatin HS	Tualatin, Oregon
G	3	DaJohn Craig	6 ft 1 in (1.85 m)	160 lb (73 kg)	So	Lawrence Central HS	Indianapolis, Indiana
F	6	Kaan Yarkut (W)	6 ft 6 in (1.98 m)	202 lb (92 kg)	Fr	Bilkent Laboratory International School	Ankara, Turkey
G	7	Nate Kingz	6 ft 5 in (1.96 m)	190 lb (86 kg)	RS Jr	College of Southern Idaho	Salem, Oregon
F	8	Gavin Marrs	7 ft 0 in (2.13 m)	200 lb (91 kg)	So	Ellensburg HS	Ellensburg, Washington
F	10	Grey Garrison (W)	6 ft 7 in (2.01 m)	200 lb (91 kg)	So	Sehome HS	Bellingham, Washington
F	11	Parsa Fallah	6 ft 9 in (2.06 m)	260 lb (118 kg)	RS Jr	Southern Utah	Amol, Iran
F	12	Michael Rataj	6 ft 9 in (2.06 m)	220 lb (100 kg)	Jr	Ratiopharm Ulm	Augsburg, Germany
F	13	Isaiah Sy	6 ft 7 in (2.01 m)	190 lb (86 kg)	So	Cloud County	Marseille, France
C	15	Matthew Marsh	7 ft 1 in (2.16 m)	250 lb (113 kg)	Sr	Wake Forest	Cornwall, England
F	22	Thomas Ndong	6 ft 10 in (2.08 m)	245 lb (111 kg)	So	NBA Academy Latin America	Montreal, Quebec
F	24	Johan Munch	6 ft 11 in (2.11 m)	200 lb (91 kg)	Fr		Copenhagen, Denmark
G	37	Liutauras Lelevicius	6 ft 7 in (2.01 m)	217 lb (98 kg)	RS So	BC Lietkabelis	Kaunas, Lithuania
F	77	Maxim Logue	6 ft 9 in (2.06 m)	215 lb (98 kg)	Fr		Lyon, France

Head coach

- Wayne Tinkle (Montana)

Assistant coach(es)

- Marlon Stewart (North Dakota)
- Stephen Thompson (Syracuse)
- Chris Haslam (Wyoming)

Legend

- (C) Team captain
- (S) Suspended
- (I) Ineligible
- (W) Walk-on
- Injured
- Current redshirt

Roster

== Schedule and results ==
Date time, TV	Rank^{#}	Opponent^{#}	Result	Record	High points	High rebounds	High assists	Site (attendance) city, state
Exhibition
October 26, 2024*; 7:00 p.m.		Montana State Billings	W 83–63		18 – Rataj	8 – Rataj	2 – 5 tied	Gill Coliseum; Corvallis, OR
Non-conference regular season
November 4, 2024*; 7:00 p.m., ESPN+		Utah Tech	W 80–57	1–0	23 – Minor	7 – Tied	4 – Tied	Gill Coliseum (2,501); Corvallis, OR
November 8, 2024*; 7:00 p.m., ESPN+		Weber State	W 76–48	2–0	16 – Tied	13 – Rataj	8 – Minor	Gill Coliseum (3,041); Corvallis, OR
November 12, 2024*; 8:00 p.m., ESPN+		Western Oregon	W 94–58	3–0	18 – Kingz	8 – Rataj	5 – Minor	Gill Coliseum (2,610); Corvallis, OR
November 15, 2024*; 7:00 p.m., ESPN+		Cal State Fullerton	W 70–51	4–0	22 – Kingz	10 – Rataj	5 – Minor	Gill Coliseum (2,737); Corvallis, OR
November 21, 2024*; 7:00 p.m., ESPN+		Oregon; Rivalry	L 75–78	4–1	20 – Rataj	10 – Rataj	4 – Fallah	Gill Coliseum (6,617); Corvallis, OR
November 25, 2024*; 5:00 p.m., ESPN+		at North Texas	L 55–58	4–2	15 – Rataj	7 – Rataj	6 – Minor	The Super Pit (3,292); Denton, TX
November 30, 2024*; 7:00 p.m., ESPN+		UC Davis	W 90–57	5–2	25 – Fallah	11 – Rataj	10 – Minor	Gill Coliseum (2,517); Corvallis, OR
December 7, 2024*; 2:00 p.m., ESPN+		Idaho	W 78–62	6–2	25 – Fallah	8 – Rataj	9 – Minor	Gill Coliseum (3,042); Corvallis, OR
December 14, 2024*; 2:00 p.m., ESPN+		UC Irvine	W 67–55	7–2	19 – Minor	9 – Minor	5 – Minor	Gill Coliseum (2,740); Corvallis, OR
December 17, 2024*; 7:00 p.m., ESPN+		Sacramento State	W 82–45	8–2	23 – Rataj	12 – Rataj	6 – Minor	Gill Coliseum (2,314); Corvallis, OR
December 22, 2024*; 12:00 p.m., ESPN2		vs. Charleston; Diamond Head Classic Quarterfinals	W 74–65	9–2	16 – Tied	12 – Rataj	4 – Fallah	Stan Sheriff Center; Honolulu, HI
December 23, 2024*; 5:00 p.m., ESPN2		vs. Oakland; Diamond Head Classic Semifinals	W 80–74 ^{OT}	10–2	17 – Lelevicius	9 – Lelevicius	4 – Minor	Stan Sheriff Center (4,319); Honolulu, HI
December 25, 2024*; 6:45 p.m., ESPN2		vs. Nebraska; Diamond Head Classic Championship	L 66–78	10–3	19 – Kingz	5 – Minor	4 – Minor	Stan Sheriff Center (5,086); Honolulu, HI
WCC regular season
December 30, 2024; 6:30 p.m., ESPN+		Portland	W 89–79	11–3 (1–0)	28 – Rataj	5 – Rataj	6 – Minor	Gill Coliseum (2,981); Corvallis, OR
January 2, 2025; 7:00 p.m., ESPN+		at Loyola Marymount	L 61–82	11–4 (1–1)	19 – Rataj	6 – Rataj	5 – Rataj	Gersten Pavilion (1,019); Los Angeles, CA
January 4, 2025; 2:00 p.m., ESPN+		San Diego	W 81–54	12–4 (2–1)	18 – Rataj	10 – Rataj	4 – Rataj	Gill Coliseum (3,120); Corvallis, OR
January 9, 2025; 7:00 p.m., ESPN+		at Santa Clara	L 81–82 ^{OT}	12–5 (2–2)	24 – Fallah	10 – Rataj	7 – Minor	Leavey Center (1,675); Santa Clara, CA
January 11, 2025; 7:00 p.m., ESPN+		at Pacific	W 91–55	13–5 (3–2)	25 – Fallah	9 – Rataj	7 – Minor	Alex G. Spanos Center (1,188); Stockton, CA
January 16, 2025; 8:00 p.m., CBSSN		No. 16 Gonzaga	W 97–89 ^{OT}	14–5 (4–2)	29 – Rataj	7 – Rataj	4 – Minor	Gill Coliseum (9,301); Corvallis, OR
January 18, 2025; 7:00 p.m., ESPN+		at San Francisco	L 70–81	14–6 (4–3)	18 – Rataj	6 – Tied	2 – Tied	Sobrato Center (2,754); San Francisco, CA
January 23, 2025; 6:30 p.m., ESPN+		Pepperdine	W 83–63	15–6 (5–3)	22 – Rataj	6 – Lake II	9 – Minor	Gill Coliseum (3,530); Corvallis, OR
January 25, 2025; 2:00 p.m., ESPN+		Santa Clara	W 83–69	16–6 (6–3)	30 – Rataj	8 – Minor	6 – Minor	Gill Coliseum (4,725); Corvallis, OR
January 28, 2025; 8:00 p.m., ESPN2		at Gonzaga	L 60–98	16–7 (6–4)	15 – Rataj	5 – Tied	3 – Kingz	McCarthey Athletic Center (6,000); Spokane, WA
February 6, 2025; 8:00 p.m., ESPN2		Washington State	W 82–74	17–7 (7–4)	21 – Rataj	8 – Rataj	5 – Kingz	Gill Coliseum (4,909); Corvallis, OR
February 8, 2025; 7:00 p.m., ESPN2		Saint Mary's	L 49–63	17–8 (7–5)	10 – Sy	5 – Fallah	3 – Lake II	Gill Coliseum (5,256); Corvallis, OR
February 13, 2025; 7:00 p.m., ESPN+		at Portland	L 72–84	17–9 (7–6)	22 – Rataj	7 – Fallah	5 – Minor	Chiles Center; Portland, OR
February 15, 2025; 2:00 p.m., ESPN+		Pacific	W 79–65	18–9 (8–6)	16 – Lake II	7 – Fallah	10 – Minor	Gill Coliseum (4,162); Corvallis, OR
February 20, 2025; 7:00 p.m., ESPN+		at Pepperdine	W 84–78	19–9 (9–6)	25 – Rataj	12 – Rataj	7 – Minor	Firestone Fieldhouse (565); Malibu, California
February 22, 2025; 2:00 p.m., ESPN+		at San Diego	W 83–73	20–9 (10–6)	29 – Rataj	10 – Rataj	3 – Tied	Jenny Craig Pavilion (2,036); San Diego, CA
February 26, 2025; 8:00 p.m., CBSSN		San Francisco	L 72–76	20–10 (10–7)	24 – Fallah	7 – Rataj	8 – Minor	Gill Coliseum (3,878); Corvallis, OR
March 1, 2025; 7:00 p.m., CBSSN		at No. 23 Saint Mary's	L 64–74	20–11 (10–8)	14 – Fallah	8 – Lelevicius	5 – Lake II	University Credit Union Pavilion (3,500); Moraga, CA
WCC Tournament
March 8, 2025; 6:00 p.m., ESPN+	(5)	vs. (9) Pepperdine; Third round	L 73–77	20–12	22 – Minor	8 – Minor	4 – Tied	Orleans Arena (2,722); Paradise, NV
College Basketball Crown
April 1, 2025*; 2:30 p.m., FS1		vs. UCF; First round	L 75–76	20–13	20 – Lelevicius	10 – Logue	6 – Lake II	MGM Grand Garden Arena (1,495); Paradise, NV
*Non-conference game. ^{#}Rankings from AP Poll. (#) Tournament seedings in parentheses. All times are in Pacific Time.
