= 2024–25 San Francisco Dons men's basketball team =

American college basketball season

2024–25 San Francisco Dons men's basketball
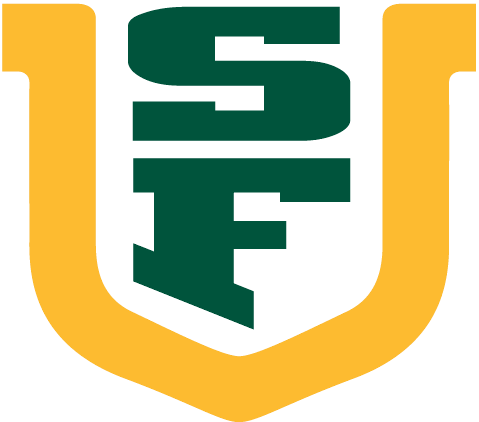

NIT, Second Round
- Conference: West Coast Conference
- Record: 25–10 (13–5 WCC)
- Head coach: Chris Gerlufsen (3rd season)
- Assistant coaches: Michael Plank; Jay Duncan; Kyle Bankhead
- Home arena: Sobrato Center (Capacity: 3,005); Chase Center (Capacity: 18,064)

2024–25 West Coast Conference men's basketball standings
	Conf.				Overall
Team	W		L	PCT	W		L	PCT
No. 24 Saint Mary's	17	–	1	.944	29	–	6	.829
No. 23 Gonzaga †	14	–	4	.778	26	–	9	.743
San Francisco	13	–	5	.722	25	–	10	.714
Santa Clara	12	–	6	.667	21	–	13	.618
Oregon State	10	–	8	.556	20	–	13	.606
Washington State	8	–	10	.444	19	–	15	.559
Loyola Marymount	8	–	10	.444	17	–	15	.531
Portland	7	–	11	.389	12	–	20	.375
Pepperdine	4	–	14	.222	13	–	22	.371
Pacific	4	–	14	.222	9	–	24	.273
San Diego	2	–	16	.111	6	–	27	.182
† 2025 WCC tournament winner Rankings from AP poll

The 2024–25 San Francisco Dons men's basketball team represented the University of San Francisco during the 2024–25 NCAA Division I men's basketball season. The Dons, led by third-year head coach Chris Gerlufsen, played their home games at the Sobrato Center and occasional games at the Chase Center, both in San Francisco, California, as members of the West Coast Conference (WCC).

== Previous season ==
The Dons finished the 2023–24 season 23–11, 11–5 in WCC play, to finish in third place. As the No. 3 seed in the WCC tournament, they defeated Portland in the quarterfinals, before losing to Gonzaga in the semifinals. They received an at-large bid to the National Invitation Tournament where they lost in the first round to Cincinnati.

== Offseason ==
=== Departures ===
Name	Number	Pos.	Height	Weight	Year	Hometown	Reason for departure
Isaiah Hawthorne	3	F	6' 8"	205	(redshirt) Junior	Tracy, CA	Transferred to Northern Colorado
Mike Sharavjamts	5	G/F	6' 8"	180	Sophomore	Ulaanbaatar, Mongolia	Transferred to Utah
Stefan Todorović	7	F	6' 8"	190	Junior	Belgrade, Serbia	Transferred to Pepperdine
Jonathan Mogbo	10	F	6' 8"	225	Junior	West Palm Beach, FL	Declared for 2024 NBA draft; selected 31st overall by Toronto Raptors
Josh Kunen	11	F	6' 8"	210	Senior	Melbourne, Australia	Graduated
Justin Bieker	12	G	6' 5"	180	(redshirt) Junior	Portland, OR	Walk-on; transferred to Utah Tech
Volodymyr Markovetskyy	33	C	7' 2"	270	Senior	Truskavets, Ukraine	Graduated
Jake Cioe	45	G	6' 0"	175	Junior	Tucson, AZ	Walk-on; transferred

=== Incoming transfers ===
Name	Number	Pos.	Height	Weight	Year	Hometown	Previous school
Carlton Linguard Jr.	2	F	7' 0"	225	GS Senior	San Antonio, TX	UTSA
Isa Silva	12	G	6' 4"	190	Senior	Sacramento, CA	Long Beach State
Jason Rivera-Torres	23	G/F	6' 7"	190	Sophomore	The Bronx, NY	Vanderbilt
Drew Ardouin	45	G	6' 1"	181	Junior	Atascadero, CA	Cuesta College

=== 2024 recruiting class ===
College recruiting information
Name	Hometown	School	Height	Weight	Commit date
Tyrone Riley #29 SG	Downey, CA	St. Pius X - St. Matthias Academy	6 ft 4 in (1.93 m)	190 lb (86 kg)	Nov 15, 2023
Tyrone Riley #29 SG	Recruit ratings: Rivals: 247Sports: ESPN: (81)				
Veniamin Abosi; SG	Heraklion, Greece	Olympiacos B.C.	6 ft 6 in (1.98 m)	N/A	Jun 26, 2024
Veniamin Abosi; SG	Recruit ratings: Rivals: 247Sports: ESPN: (NR)				
James O'Donnell; C	Sydney, Australia	Centre of Excellence	6 ft 9 in (2.06 m)	N/A	Oct 5, 2023
James O'Donnell; C	Recruit ratings: Rivals: 247Sports: ESPN: (NR)				
Overall recruit ranking: Scout: NR Rivals: NR ESPN: NR
Note: In many cases, Scout, Rivals, 247Sports, On3, and ESPN may conflict in their listings of height and weight.; In these cases, the average was taken. ESPN grades are on a 100-point scale.; Sources: "San Francisco Dons 2023 Basketball Commitments". Rivals.; "2024 San Francisco Dons Basketball Commits". Scout.; "ESPN". ESPN.; "Scout.com Team Recruiting Rankings". Scout.; "2024 Team Ranking". Rivals.

== Roster ==
2024–25 San Francisco Dons men's basketball team
Players
Coaches

Pos.	#	Name	Height	Weight	Year	Previous school	Hometown
G	0	Ryan Beasley	5 ft 11 in (1.8 m)	172 lb (78 kg)	So	Dougherty Valley HS	San Ramon, CA
G	1	Malik Thomas	6 ft 5 in (1.96 m)	205 lb (93 kg)	Sr	USC	Fontana, CA
C	2	Carlton Linguard Jr	7 ft 0 in (2.13 m)	225 lb (102 kg)	GS	UTSA	San Antonio, TX
G	5	Tyrone Riley IV	6 ft 6 in (1.98 m)	180 lb (82 kg)	Fr	St. Pius X-St. Matthias	Downey, CA
C	10	Saba Gigiberia	7 ft 2 in (2.18 m)	250 lb (113 kg)	Sr	Georgia Tech	Tbilisi, Georgia
F	11	James O'Donnell	6 ft 9 in (2.06 m)	230 lb (104 kg)	Fr	Centre of Excellence	Sydney, Australia
G	12	Isa Silva	6 ft 4 in (1.93 m)	190 lb (86 kg)	Sr	Long Beach State	Sacramento, CA
G	13	Robby Beasley	6 ft 3 in (1.91 m)	188 lb (85 kg)	Sr	UC Davis	San Ramon, CA
G/F	14	Veniamin Abosi	6 ft 6 in (1.98 m)	225 lb (102 kg)	Fr	Olympiacos B.C.	Heraklion, Greece
F	21	Ndewedo Newbury	6 ft 7 in (2.01 m)	235 lb (107 kg)	Sr	The Loomis Chaffee School	London, England
G/F	23	Jason Rivera-Torres	6 ft 7 in (2.01 m)	190 lb (86 kg)	Fr	Vanderbilt	The Bronx, NY
F	34	Karl Markus Poom (W)	6 ft 8 in (2.03 m)	210 lb (95 kg)	Fr		Tartu, Estonia
F	35	Junjie Wang	6 ft 9 in (2.06 m)	240 lb (109 kg)	So	NBA Global Academy	Xuzhou, China
G	45	Drew Ardouin	6 ft 4 in (1.93 m)	181 lb (82 kg)	Jr	Cuesta College	Atascadero, CA
G	55	Marcus Williams	6 ft 2 in (1.88 m)	200 lb (91 kg)	Sr	Texas A&M	Dickinson, TX

Head coach

- Chris Gerlufsen (Randolph–Macon)

Assistant coach(es)

- Michael Plank (Willamette)
- Jay Duncan (Northwood)
- Kyle Bankhead (Gonzaga)

Legend

- (C) Team captain
- (S) Suspended
- (I) Ineligible
- (W) Walk-on
- Injured
- Current redshirt

Roster
Last update: February 16, 2025

== Schedule and results ==
Date time, TV	Rank^{#}	Opponent^{#}	Result	Record	High points	High rebounds	High assists	Site (attendance) city, state
Non-conference regular season
November 5, 2024*; 7:00 p.m., ESPN+		Cal Poly	W 86–78	1–0	26 – Riley IV	8 – Rivera-Torres	5 – Williams	Sobrato Center (2,073); San Francisco, CA
November 9, 2024*; 7:30 p.m., ESPN+		Boise State	W 84–73	2–0	22 – Thomas	10 – Newbury	6 – Williams	Sobrato Center (2,963); San Francisco, CA
November 13, 2024*; 7:00 p.m., ESPN+		Long Beach State	W 84–54	3–0	15 – Thomas	7 – Linguard Jr.	4 – 2 tied	Sobrato Center (1,928); San Francisco, CA
November 16, 2024*; 7:00 p.m., ESPN+		Chicago State; Sunshine Slam campus-site game	W 82–37	4–0	28 – Riley IV	8 – Williams	5 – 2 tied	Sobrato Center (1,864); San Francisco, CA
November 21, 2024*; 7:00 p.m., ESPNU		vs. Memphis; USF Legacy Showcase	L 64–68	4–1	25 – Thomas	13 – Riley	3 – Williams	Chase Center; San Francisco, CA
November 25, 2024*; 3:30 p.m., CBSSN		vs. Clemson; Sunshine Slam Beach Division semifinals	L 55–70	4–2	14 – Thomas	5 – 2 tied	4 – Newbury	Ocean Center (1,690); Daytona Beach, FL
November 26, 2024*; 10:30 a.m., CBSSN		vs. Fordham; Sunshine Slam Beach Division consolation game	W 85–64	5–2	21 – Newbury	8 – Riley IV	5 – 2 tied	Ocean Center; Daytona Beach, FL
December 1, 2024*; 4:00 p.m., ESPN+		Mercyhurst	W 87–59	6–2	29 – Thomas	8 – Newbury	4 – 2 tied	Sobrato Center (1,234); San Francisco, CA
December 5, 2024*; 7:00 p.m., ESPN+		Saint Louis	W 78–61	7–2	22 – Thomas	8 – Riley IV	5 – Williams	Sobrato Center; San Francisco, CA
December 11, 2024*; 7:00 p.m., ESPN+		Stanislaus State	W 68–52	8–2	17 – Newbury	7 – 3 tied	3 – 3 tied	Sobrato Center (1,238); San Francisco, CA
December 15, 2024*; 3:00 p.m., ESPN+		vs. Loyola Chicago; Milwaukee Tip-Off	W 76–66	9–2	35 – Thomas	7 – Wang	6 – Williams	Fiserv Forum (3,278); Milwaukee, WI
December 18, 2024*; 5:00 p.m., ESPN+		at Bradley	L 64–66	9–3	18 – Williams	7 – 2 tied	3 – Ry. Beasley	Carver Arena (4,918); Peoria, IL
December 21, 2024*; 3:00 p.m., ESPN+		Montana	W 71–67	10–3	25 – Williams	7 – Riley IV	3 – Williams	Sobrato Center (2,238); San Francisco, CA
WCC regular season
December 28, 2024; 7:00 p.m., ESPN+		Loyola Marymount	W 70–55	11–3 (1–0)	19 – Thomas	9 – Linguard Jr.	3 – 3 tied	Sobrato Center (2,438); San Francisco, CA
December 30, 2024; 7:00 p.m., ESPN+		Santa Clara	W 97–94 ^{OT}	12–3 (2–0)	34 – Thomas	8 – 2 tied	8 – Williams	Sobrato Center (2,958); San Francisco, CA
January 2, 2025; 7:00 p.m., ESPN+		at Pacific	W 89–81	13–3 (3–0)	24 – Thomas	6 – Linguard Jr.	7 – Williams	Alex G. Spanos Center (1,227); Stockton, CA
January 4, 2025; 4:00 p.m., ESPN+		at Washington State	L 82–91	13–4 (3–1)	34 – Thomas	7 – Linguard Jr.	3 – 2 tied	Beasley Coliseum (3,823); Pullman, WA
January 9, 2025; 7:00 p.m., ESPN+		Portland	W 81–72	14–4 (4–1)	19 – Thomas	7 – O'Donnell	4 – 2 tied	Sobrato Center (1,824); San Francisco, CA
January 11, 2025; 4:00 p.m., ESPN+		at Santa Clara	L 54–77	14–5 (4–2)	19 – Thomas	4 – 3 tied	6 – Williams	Leavey Center (2,500); Santa Clara, CA
January 16, 2025; 7:00 p.m., ESPN+		at Pepperdine	W 80–63	15–5 (5–2)	20 – Thomas	6 – Abosi	4 – Williams	Firestone Fieldhouse (248); Malibu, CA
January 18, 2025; 7:00 p.m., ESPN+		Oregon State	W 81–70	16–5 (6–2)	24 – Thomas	5 – Abosi	6 – Ry. Beasley	Sobrato Center (2,754); San Francisco, CA
January 23, 2025; 6:00 p.m., CBSSN		at Saint Mary's	L 51–71	16–6 (6–3)	14 – 2 tied	5 – 2 tied	3 – Williams	University Credit Union Pavilion (3,500); Moraga, CA
January 25, 2025; 7:00 p.m., ESPN+		San Diego	W 81–69	17–6 (7–3)	17 – Thomas	8 – Linguard Jr.	4 – 2 tied	Sobrato Center (2,985); San Francisco, CA
February 1, 2025; 7:00 p.m., ESPN+		Washington State	W 75–51	18–6 (8–3)	17 – Williams	9 – Rivera-Torres	7 – Williams	Sobrato Center (3,200); San Francisco, CA
February 6, 2025; 6:00 p.m., ESPN2		Saint Mary's	W 65–64	19–6 (9–3)	16 – Williams	9 – Riley IV	2 – 2 tied	Sobrato Center (3,200); San Francisco, CA
February 8, 2025; 6:00 p.m., ESPN+		at Loyola Marymount	W 72–66	20–6 (10–3)	19 – Williams	8 – Riley IV	3 – 2 tied	Gersten Pavilion (1,687); Los Angeles, CA
February 13, 2025; 8:00 p.m., ESPN		at Gonzaga	L 77–88	20–7 (10–4)	25 – Thomas	6 – 2 tied	8 – Williams	McCarthey Athletic Center (6,000); Spokane, WA
February 15, 2025; 7:00 p.m., ESPN+		at San Diego	W 84–61	21–7 (11–4)	23 – Williams	7 – 2 tied	2 – 5 tied	Jenny Craig Pavilion (1,472); San Diego, CA
February 20, 2025; 7:00 p.m., ESPN+		Pacific	W 71–58	22–7 (12–4)	23 – Thomas	10 – Riley IV	4 – Williams	Sobrato Center (2,939); San Francisco, CA
February 26, 2025; 8:00 p.m., CBSSN		at Oregon State	W 74–72	23–7 (13–4)	21 – Williams	7 – Gigiberia	4 – Tied	Gill Coliseum (3,878); Corvallis, OR
March 1, 2025; 8:00 p.m., ESPN		Gonzaga	L 75–95	23–8 (13–5)	28 – Williams	11 – Riley IV	5 – Williams	Chase Center (6,374); San Francisco, CA
WCC tournament
March 9, 2025; 8:00 p.m., ESPN2	(3)	vs. (6) Washington State; Quarterfinals	W 86–75	24–8	26 – Ry. Beasley	10 – Wang	3 – 3 tied	Orleans Arena (2,523); Paradise, NV
March 10, 2025; 8:30 p.m., ESPN2	(3)	vs. (2) Gonzaga; Semifinals	L 76–85	24–9	27 – Thomas	8 – Thomas	5 – Ry. Beasley	Orleans Arena (6,217); Paradise, NV
NIT
March 19, 2025*; 8:00 p.m., ESPNU	(1)	Utah Valley; First Round – San Francisco Region	W 79–70	25–9	21 – Thomas	10 – Thomas	6 – Ry. Beasley	Sobrato Center (1,309); San Francisco, CA
March 23, 2025*; 4:00 p.m., ESPN2	(1)	Loyola Chicago; Second Round – San Francisco Region	L 76–77	25–10	36 – Thomas	8 – Linguard Jr.	5 – Thomas	Sobrato Center (1,624); San Francisco, CA
*Non-conference game. ^{#}Rankings from AP poll. (#) Tournament seedings in parentheses. All times are in Pacific.
