= 2024–25 Loyola Marymount Lions men's basketball team =

American college basketball season

2024–25 Loyola Marymount Lions men's basketball

Cancún Challenge Riviera Division champions
- Conference: West Coast Conference
- Record: 17–15 (8–10 WCC)
- Head coach: Stan Johnson (5th season)
- Assistant coaches: Lorenzo Romar; Ricky Muench; Louis Wilson
- Home arena: Gersten Pavilion

2024–25 West Coast Conference men's basketball standings
	Conf.				Overall
Team	W		L	PCT	W		L	PCT
No. 24 Saint Mary's	17	–	1	.944	29	–	6	.829
No. 23 Gonzaga †	14	–	4	.778	26	–	9	.743
San Francisco	13	–	5	.722	25	–	10	.714
Santa Clara	12	–	6	.667	21	–	13	.618
Oregon State	10	–	8	.556	20	–	13	.606
Washington State	8	–	10	.444	19	–	15	.559
Loyola Marymount	8	–	10	.444	17	–	15	.531
Portland	7	–	11	.389	12	–	20	.375
Pepperdine	4	–	14	.222	13	–	22	.371
Pacific	4	–	14	.222	9	–	24	.273
San Diego	2	–	16	.111	6	–	27	.182
† 2025 WCC tournament winner Rankings from AP poll

The 2024–25 Loyola Marymount Lions men's basketball team represented Loyola Marymount University during the 2024–25 NCAA Division I men's basketball season. The Lions, led by fifth-year head coach Stan Johnson, played their home games at Gersten Pavilion in Los Angeles, California as a member of the West Coast Conference.

== Previous season ==
The Lions finished the 2023–24 season 12–19, 5–11 in conference play, for 7th place in the conference. They lost in the second round of the WCC Tournament to Portland.

== Offseason ==
=== Departures ===
Name	Number	Pos.	Height	Weight	Year	Hometown	Reason for departure
Justice Hill	3	G	6'0"	175	Senior	Little Rock, AR	Transferred to Murray State to play football
Justin Wright	5	G	6'2"	195	Senior	Greenville, NC	Transferred to UNC Asheville
Noah Taitz	10	G	6'3"	190	(redshirt) Junior	Las Vegas, NV	Transferred to Utah Valley
Lars Thiemann	15	F/C	7'1"	260	GS senior	Krefeld, Germany	Graduated; signed to play with Telekom Baskets Bonn
Michael Graham	21	F	6'8"	235	Senior	Brooklyn, NY	Transferred to Hofstra
Keli Leaupepe	34	F	6'6"	240	GS senior	Melbourne, Australia	Graduated; signed to play with Sydney Kings
Dominick Harris	55	G	6'3"	190	RS junior	Murrieta, CA	Transferred to UCLA

=== Incoming transfers ===
Name	Number	Pos.	Height	Weight	Year	Hometown	Previous school
Myron "MJ" Amey Jr.	5	G	6'2"	185	(redshirt) Junior	Vacaville, CA	San Jose State
Jan Vide	7	G	6'6"	200	Sophomore	Domžale, Slovenia	UCLA
Jevon Porter	14	F	6'11"	225	Junior	Columbia, MO	Pepperdine
Matar Diop	21	F	6'10"	213	Sophomore	Dakar, Senegal	Nebraska
Caleb Stone-Carrawell	25	F	6'7"	210	Sixth year	Charlotte, NC	Utah Valley

=== Recruiting classes ===
==== 2024 recruiting class ====
College recruiting
Name	Hometown	School	Height	Weight	Commit date
Marley Zeller; G	Portland, OR	Central Catholic HS	6 ft 5 in (1.96 m)	190 lb (86 kg)	
Marley Zeller; G	Recruit ratings: No ratings found				
Jael Martin; F	Carlsbad, CA	Carlsbad, CA	6 ft 8 in (2.03 m)	190 lb (86 kg)	
Jael Martin; F	Recruit ratings: No ratings found				
Overall recruit ranking: Scout: nr Rivals: nr ESPN: nr
Note: In many cases, Scout, Rivals, 247Sports, On3, and ESPN may conflict in their listings of height and weight.; In these cases, the average was taken. ESPN grades are on a 100-point scale.; Sources: "Loyola Marymount Lions 2024 Basketball Commitments". Rivals.; "2024 Loyola Marymount Lions Basketball Commits". Scout.; "ESPN 2024 Loyola Marymount Lions Basketball recruits". ESPN.; "Scout.com Team Recruiting Rankings". Scout.; "2024 Team Ranking". Rivals.

== Roster ==
2024–25 Loyola Marymount Lions men's basketball team
Players
Coaches

Pos.	#	Name	Height	Weight	Year	Previous school	Hometown
G	3	Marley Zeller	6 ft 5 in (1.96 m)	190 lb (86 kg)	Fr	Central Catholic HS	Portland, OR
G	4	Will Johnston	6 ft 3 in (1.91 m)	185 lb (84 kg)	Sr	The King's School; UTRGV	Sydney, Australia
G	5	M. J. Amey Jr.	6 ft 2 in (1.88 m)	185 lb (84 kg)	RS Jr	Scotland Prep (Pa.); San Jose State	Vacaville, CA
G	7	Jan Vide	6 ft 6 in (1.98 m)	200 lb (91 kg)	So	SEK El Castillo; UCLA	Domžale, Slovenia
F	8	Jovan Ristic	6 ft 5 in (1.96 m)	205 lb (93 kg)	So	Calusa Preparatory School	Belgrade, Serbia
G	10	Lamaj Lewis	6 ft 6 in (1.98 m)	210 lb (95 kg)	Sr	St. John Charter HS	Paramount, CA
F	14	Jevon Porter	6 ft 11 in (2.11 m)	225 lb (102 kg)	Jr	Tolton HS; Pepperdine	Columbia, MO
F	16	Aaron McBride	6 ft 6 in (1.98 m)	210 lb (95 kg)	So	Centennial HS	Corona, CA
F	21	Matar Diop	6 ft 10 in (2.08 m)	213 lb (97 kg)	So	Keystone Athletic Academy; Nebraska	Dakar, Senegal
C	22	Rick Issanza	7 ft 1 in (2.16 m)	245 lb (111 kg)	GS	Bella Vista Prep; Oklahoma	Kinshasa, Congo
F	23	Alex Merkviladze	6 ft 8 in (2.03 m)	225 lb (102 kg)	GS	Modesto Christian School; Cal State Northridge	Kutaisi, Georgia
G	24	Jael Martin	6 ft 8 in (2.03 m)	190 lb (86 kg)	Fr	Carlsbad HS	Carlsbad, CA
F	25	Caleb Stone-Carrawell	6 ft 7 in (2.01 m)	210 lb (95 kg)	GS	Cox Mill HS; Austin Peay; Utah Valley	Concord, NC
G	41	Kevin Carney (W)	5 ft 11 in (1.8 m)	160 lb (73 kg)	Jr	Sacred Heart Prep	Menlo Park, CA
F	42	George Tupy (W)	6 ft 6 in (1.98 m)	225 lb (102 kg)	So	St. Francis HS	Sierra Madre, CA

Head coach

- Stan Johnson (Bemidji State)

Assistant coach(es)

- Lorenzo Romar (Washington)
- Ricky Muench (Marquette)
- Louis Wilson (William Jewell)

Legend

- (C) Team captain
- (S) Suspended
- (I) Ineligible
- (W) Walk-on
- Injured
- Current redshirt

Roster

== Schedule and results ==
Date time, TV	Rank^{#}	Opponent^{#}	Result	Record	High points	High rebounds	High assists	Site (attendance) city, state
Non-conference regular season
November 4, 2024*; 7:00 p.m., ESPN+		Life Pacific	W 99–56	1–0	22 – Merkviladze	9 – Merkviladze	8 – Johnston	Gersten Pavilion (1,288); Los Angeles, CA
November 8, 2024*; 7:00 p.m., ESPN+		UC Irvine	L 51–66	1–1	19 – Porter	12 – Porter	3 – Johnston	Gersten Pavilion (1,144); Los Angeles, CA
November 16, 2024*; 5:00 p.m., ESPN+		at Saint Louis	L 71–77	1–2	27 – Johnston	12 – Merkviladze	2 – Tied	Chaifetz Arena (5,210); St. Louis, MO
November 22, 2024*; 7:00 p.m., ESPN+		North Dakota; Cancún Challenge campus site game	L 73–77	1–3	17 – Stone-Carrawell	9 – Porter	4 – Johnston	Gersten Pavilion (1,121); Los Angeles, CA
November 26, 2024*; 5:30 p.m., CBSSN		vs. Belmont; Cancún Challenge Riviera Division semifinals	W 77–63	2–3	22 – Johnston	12 – Porter	4 – Porter	Hard Rock Hotel Riviera Maya (417); Cancún, Mexico
November 27, 2024*; 5:30 p.m., CBSSN		vs. Wyoming; Cancún Challenge Riviera Division championships	W 73–70	3–3	29 – Porter	7 – Tied	5 – Johnston	Hard Rock Hotel Riviera Maya (853); Cancún, Mexico
December 4, 2024*; 3:00 p.m., MW Network		at Colorado State	L 54–83	3–4	12 – Johnston	7 – Merkviladze	2 – Tied	Moby Arena (4,247); Fort Collins, CO
December 7, 2024*; 6:00 p.m., ESPN+		Nevada	W 68–64	4–4	19 – Merkviladze	8 – Porter	4 – Vide	Gersten Pavilion (1,370); Los Angeles, CA
December 14, 2024*; 6:00 p.m., ESPN+		Prairie View A&M	W 76–75	5–4	23 – Johnston	12 – Porter	9 – Porter	Gersten Pavilion (769); Los Angeles, CA
December 18, 2024*; 7:00 p.m., ESPN+		UC Santa Barbara	W 60–58	6–4	15 – Stone-Carrawell	7 – Merkviladze	5 – Johnston	Gersten Pavilion (962); Los Angeles, CA
December 20, 2024*; 7:00 p.m., ESPN+		Southern	W 89–73	7–4	24 – Merkviladze	8 – Porter	5 – Johnston	Gersten Pavilion (789); Los Angeles, CA
December 22, 2024*; 4:00 p.m., ESPN+		North Alabama	W 85–69	8–4	28 – Stone-Carrawell	12 – Merkviladze	8 – Porter	Gersten Pavilion (818); Los Angeles, CA
WCC regular season
December 28, 2024; 7:00 p.m., ESPN+		at San Francisco	L 55–70	8–5 (0–1)	22 – Porter	6 – Tied	3 – Johnston	Sobrato Center (2,438); San Francisco, CA
December 30, 2024; 6:30 p.m., ESPN+		at Washington State	L 59–73	8–6 (0–2)	20 – Stone-Carrawell	8 – Merkviladze	3 – Porter	Spokane Arena (3,449); Spokane, WA
January 2, 2025; 7:00 p.m., ESPN+		Oregon State	W 82–61	9–6 (1–2)	22 – Porter	13 – Porter	7 – Johnston	Gersten Pavilion (1,019); Los Angeles, CA
January 4, 2025; 6:00 p.m., ESPN+		No. 19 Gonzaga	L 68–96	9–7 (1–3)	18 – Johnston	8 – Porter	3 – Vide	Gersten Pavilion (2,369); Los Angeles, CA
January 7, 2025; 8:00 p.m., ESPN2		at Saint Mary's	L 56–81	9–8 (1–4)	16 – Stone-Carrawell	5 – Vide	2 – 3 players	University Credit Union Pavilion (3,344); Moraga, CA
January 16, 2025; 7:00 p.m., ESPN+		Santa Clara	W 57–54	10–8 (2–4)	17 – Stone-Carrawell	7 – Merkviladze	4 – Johnston	Gersten Pavilion (1,499); Los Angeles, CA
January 18, 2025; 6:00 p.m., ESPN+		San Diego	W 77–70	11–8 (3–4)	18 – Merkviladze	12 – Porter	4 – Porter	Gersten Pavilion (1,152); Los Angeles, CA
January 23, 2025; 7:00 p.m., ESPN+		at Pacific	W 73–68	12–8 (4–4)	24 – Amey Jr.	8 – Porter	5 – Johnston	Alex G. Spanos Center (1,064); Stockton, CA
January 30, 2025; 7:00 p.m., ESPN+		Portland	W 88–63	13–8 (5–4)	16 – Merkviladze	10 – Porter	4 – Johnston	Gersten Pavilion (1,049); Los Angeles, CA
February 1, 2025; 2:00 p.m., ESPN+		at San Diego	W 78–62	14–8 (6–4)	16 – Amey	12 – Porter	4 – Tied	Jenny Craig Pavilion (987); San Diego, CA
February 6, 2025; 6:00 p.m., ESPN+		at Gonzaga	L 53–73	14–9 (6–5)	20 – Stone-Carrawell	7 – Tied	2 – Vide	McCarthey Athletic Center (6,000); Spokane, WA
February 8, 2025; 6:00 p.m., ESPN+		San Francisco	L 66–72	14–10 (6–6)	14 – Tied	11 – Merkviladze	2 – Tied	Gersten Pavilion (1,678); Los Angeles, CA
February 11, 2025; 6:00 p.m., ESPN+		at Pepperdine; Game rescheduled due to Los Angeles wildfires.	W 69–60	15–10 (7–6)	20 – Johnston	9 – Merkviladze	4 – Johnston	Firestone Fieldhouse (320); Malibu, CA
February 13, 2025; 7:00 p.m., ESPN+		Pacific	L 58–83	15–11 (7–7)	19 – Stone-Carrawell	5 – Merkviladze	3 – Johnston	Gersten Pavilion (861); Los Angeles, CA
February 15, 2025; 7:00 p.m., ESPN+		at Portland	L 78–89	15–12 (7–8)	18 – Stone-Carrawell	9 – Merkviladze	3 – Johnston	Chiles Center (1,751); Portland, OR
February 20, 2025; 8:00 p.m., ESPN2		at Santa Clara	L 61–76	15–13 (7–9)	18 – Johnston	7 – Issanza	3 – Tied	Leavey Center (2,129); Santa Clara, CA
February 22, 2025; 6:00 p.m., ESPN+		Pepperdine	W 93–82	16–13 (8–9)	21 – Merkviladze	6 – Vide	6 – Vide	Gersten Pavilion (1,173); Los Angeles, CA
February 27, 2025; 8:00 p.m., CBSSN		No. 23 Saint Mary's	L 55–58	16–14 (8–10)	17 – Stone-Carrawell	6 – Merkviladze	2 – Tied	Gersten Pavilion (1,609); Los Angeles, CA
WCC tournament
March 7, 2025; 8:30 PM	(7)	vs. (11) San Diego; Second round	W 100–74	17–14	27 – Johnston	8 – Merkviladze	8 – Johnston	Orleans Arena (1,826); Paradise, NV
March 8, 2025; 8:30 PM	(7)	vs. (6) Washington State; Third round	L 77–94	17–15	16 – Amey	8 – Tied	5 – Merkviladze	Orleans Arena (3,048); Paradise, NV
*Non-conference game. ^{#}Rankings from AP Poll. (#) Tournament seedings in parentheses.
