= 2024–25 Pacific Tigers men's basketball team =

American college basketball season

2024–25 Pacific Tigers men's basketball
- Conference: West Coast Conference
- Record: 9–24 (4–14 WCC)
- Head coach: Dave Smart (1st season)
- Assistant coaches: Clay Wilson (1st season); Craig Beaucamp (1st season); Garrett Bridges (1st season); Senque Carey (1st season)
- Home arena: Alex G. Spanos Center

2024–25 West Coast Conference men's basketball standings
	Conf.				Overall
Team	W		L	PCT	W		L	PCT
No. 24 Saint Mary's	17	–	1	.944	29	–	6	.829
No. 23 Gonzaga †	14	–	4	.778	26	–	9	.743
San Francisco	13	–	5	.722	25	–	10	.714
Santa Clara	12	–	6	.667	21	–	13	.618
Oregon State	10	–	8	.556	20	–	13	.606
Washington State	8	–	10	.444	19	–	15	.559
Loyola Marymount	8	–	10	.444	17	–	15	.531
Portland	7	–	11	.389	12	–	20	.375
Pepperdine	4	–	14	.222	13	–	22	.371
Pacific	4	–	14	.222	9	–	24	.273
San Diego	2	–	16	.111	6	–	27	.182
† 2025 WCC tournament winner Rankings from AP poll

The 2024–25 Pacific Tigers men's basketball team represented the University of the Pacific during the 2024–25 NCAA Division I men's basketball season. The Tigers were led by first-year head coach Dave Smart and played their home games at the Alex G. Spanos Center in Stockton, California as members of the West Coast Conference (WCC).

== Previous season ==
The Tigers finished the 2023–24 season 6–26, 0–16 in WCC play, to finish in ninth place. As the No. 9 seed in the WCC tournament, they were defeated by Pepperdine in the first round.

== Offseason ==
=== Departures ===
Name	Number	Pos.	Height	Weight	Year	Hometown	Reason for departure
Greg Outlaw	0	G/F	6' 4"	175	(redshirt) Senior	Chicago, IL	Graduated
Donovan Williams	1	G	6' 5"	200	Senior	Rockford, IL	Graduate transferred to Western Michigan
Jalen Brown	2	G	6' 3"	170	Senior	Portland, OR	Graduated
Tyler Beard	3	G	6' 2"	180	Junior	Chicago, IL	Transferred to Cal State Northridge
Moe Odum	4	G	6' 1"	160	Sophomore	New York, NY	Transferred to Pepperdine
Cam Denson	13	G/F	6' 7"	210	Junior	Compton, CA	Transferred to Long Beach State
Greydon Edwards	14	G	6' 0"	170	Junior	Bentonville, AR	Walk-on; left the team due to personal reasons
Nick Blake	25	G	6' 6"	200	Senior	Las Vegas, NV	Graduate transferred
Judson Martindale	33	G/F	6' 7"	210	(redshirt) Junior	Sudbury, MA	Transferred to Cal State Northridge
Makai Richards	34	F	6' 10"	225	(redshirt) Sophomore	Oak Park, CA	Transferred to Chattanooga

=== Incoming transfers ===
Name	Number	Pos.	Height	Weight	Year	Hometown	Previous school
Jefferson Koulibaly	0	G	6' 3"	185	(redshirt) Junior	Montreal, QC	SMU
Lamar Washington	1	G	6' 4"	205	Junior	Chandler, AZ	Texas Tech
Elias Ralph	2		6' 7"		Senior	Okotoks, AB	Victoria
Donyae May	4	G	6' 1"	161	Junior	Russellville, AR	Connors State College
Seth Jones	7	G	6' 1"		Junior	Dickinson, TX	Tallahassee CC
Kris Keinys	8	F	6' 8"	215	Sophomore	Klaipėda, Lithuania	Minnesota
Elijah Fisher	22	G	6' 6"	190	Junior	Oshawa, ON	Minnesota
Jazz Gardner	32	C	7'0"	225	Sophomore	Pasadena, CA	Nevada

=== 2024 recruiting class ===
College recruiting information
Name	Hometown	School	Height	Weight	Commit date
Eddie Jallow Hedqvist; PG	Basketgymnasiet RIG MARK	Stockholm, Sweden	6 ft 5 in (1.96 m)	185 lb (84 kg)	May 19, 2024
Eddie Jallow Hedqvist; PG	Recruit ratings: Scout: Rivals: (0)				
Solomon Ominu; C	Our Saviour Lutheran School	Kaduna, Nigeria	6 ft 8 in (2.03 m)	211 lb (96 kg)	May 26, 2024
Solomon Ominu; C	Recruit ratings: Scout: Rivals: (0)				
Overall recruit ranking: Scout: 98 Rivals: nr ESPN: nr
Note: In many cases, Scout, Rivals, 247Sports, On3, and ESPN may conflict in their listings of height and weight.; In these cases, the average was taken. ESPN grades are on a 100-point scale.; Sources: "Pacific 2024 Basketball Commitments". Rivals.; "2024 Pacific Basketball Commits". Scout.; "ESPN". ESPN.; "Scout.com Team Recruiting Rankings". Scout.; "2024 Team Ranking". Rivals.

== Roster ==
2024–25 Pacific Tigers men's basketball team
Players
Coaches

Pos.	#	Name	Height	Weight	Year	Previous school	Hometown
G	0	Jefferson Koulibaly	6 ft 3 in (1.91 m)	190 lb (86 kg)	RS Jr	Lincoln Prep; SMU	Montreal, QC
G	1	Lamar Washington	6 ft 4 in (1.93 m)	200 lb (91 kg)	Jr	Compass Prep (AZ); Texas Tech	Portland, OR
F	2	Elias Ralph	6 ft 7 in (2.01 m)	212 lb (96 kg)	Sr	Holy Trinity Academy; Victoria	Okotoks, AB
G	4	Donyae May	6 ft 0 in (1.83 m)	170 lb (77 kg)	Jr	Russellville HS; Connors State College	Russellville, AR
G	6	Eddie Jallow Hedqvist	6 ft 5 in (1.96 m)	185 lb (84 kg)	Fr	Marks Gymnasium	Stockholm, Sweden
G	7	Seth Jones	6 ft 2 in (1.88 m)	178 lb (81 kg)	Jr	Dickinson HS; Tallahassee CC	Dickinson, TX
F	8	Kris Keinys	6 ft 8 in (2.03 m)	214 lb (97 kg)	So	Klaipedos Vytauto Didžiojo; Minnesota	Klaipėda, Lithuania
F	9	Solomon Ominu	6 ft 8 in (2.03 m)	211 lb (96 kg)	Fr	Our Savior Lutheran	Kaduna, Nigeria
F/C	11	Burke Smith	6 ft 11 in (2.11 m)	232 lb (105 kg)	RS Sr	Trinity Episcopal School	Glen Allen, VA
G	22	Elijah Fisher	6 ft 6 in (1.98 m)	220 lb (100 kg)	Jr	Crestwood Prep; DePaul	Oshawa, ON
G	23	Petar Krivokapic	6 ft 4 in (1.93 m)	210 lb (95 kg)	Sr	Miami Prep School; FIU	Budva, Montenegro
C	32	Jazz Gardner	7 ft 0 in (2.13 m)	230 lb (104 kg)	So	West Ranch HS; Nevada	Pasadena, CA

Head coach

- Dave Smart (Queens (ON))

Assistant coach(es)

- Clay Wilson (Princeton)
- Craig Beaucamp (Saskatchewan)
- Garrett Bridges (St. Augustine's)
- Senque Carey (New Mexico)

Legend

- (C) Team captain
- (S) Suspended
- (I) Ineligible
- (W) Walk-on
- Injured
- Current redshirt

Roster
Last update: January 3, 2025

== Schedule and results ==
Date time, TV	Rank^{#}	Opponent^{#}	Result	Record	High points	High rebounds	High assists	Site (attendance) city, state
Non-conference regular season
November 4, 2024*; 7:00 p.m., ESPN+		Jessup	W 92–65	1–0	30 – Ralph	9 – Gardner	15 – Washington	Alex G. Spanos Center (3,772); Stockton, CA
November 8, 2024*; 7:30 p.m., ESPN+		vs. San Jose State; Outrigger Rainbow Classic	W 80–67	2–0	14 – tied	10 – Ralph	10 – Washington	Stan Sheriff Center (4,221); Honolulu, HI
November 10, 2024*; 5:30 p.m., ESPN+		vs. Life Pacific; Outrigger Rainbow Classic	W 94–41	3–0	21 – Fisher	10 – Jones	8 – Washington	Stan Sheriff Center (4,580); Honolulu, HI
November 11, 2024*; 10:00 p.m., ESPN+		at Hawaii; Outrigger Rainbow Classic	L 66–76	3–1	21 – Fisher	8 – Ralph	4 – Washington	Stan Sheriff Center (4,313); Honolulu, HI
November 14, 2024*; 7:00 p.m., ESPN+		Northern Arizona	L 57–60	3–2	23 – Ralph	11 – Ralph	5 – Ralph	Alex G. Spanos Center (1,045); Stockton, CA
November 18, 2024*; 5:00 p.m., SECN+		at No. 20 Arkansas	L 72–91	3–3	23 – Fisher	10 – Ralph	5 – Washington	Bud Walton Arena (19,200); Fayetteville, AR
November 22, 2024*; 4:30 p.m., SECN+		at Missouri; Missouri Multi-Team Event	L 56–91	3–4	19 – Ralph	7 – Gardner	4 – Ralph	Mizzou Arena (9,564); Columbia, MO
November 27, 2024*; 7:00 p.m., ESPN+		Arkansas–Pine Bluff; Missouri Multi-Team Event	W 83–71	4–4	28 – Fisher	13 – Ralph	7 – tied	Alex G. Spanos Center (1,020); Stockton, CA
November 30, 2024*; 4:00 p.m., ESPN+		Cal State Fullerton	W 64–55	5–4	17 – tied	12 – Krivokapic	7 – Washington	Alex G. Spanos Center (979); Stockton, CA
December 2, 2024*; 6:00 p.m., ESPN+		at Colorado	L 66–75	5–5	24 – Ralph	9 – Gardner	7 – Washington	CU Events Center (5,235); Boulder, CO
December 7, 2024*; 4:00 p.m., ESPN+		at Illinois State	L 61–72	5–6	15 – Gardner	10 – Ralph	2 – tied	CEFCU Arena (3,595); Normal, IL
December 14, 2024*; 7:30 p.m., MW Network		vs. UNLV; Jack Jones Classic	L 65–72	5–7	19 – Ralph	11 – Ralph	9 – Washington	Lee's Family Forum; Henderson, NV
December 18, 2024*; 7:00 p.m., ESPN+		Portland State	L 75–81	5–8	15 – tied	7 – tied	6 – Washington	Alex G. Spanos Center (1,074); Stockton, CA
December 20, 2024*; 1:00 p.m., ESPN+		Idaho	L 72–95	5–9	18 – Ralph	8 – Fisher	6 – Washington	Alex G. Spanos Center (1,222); Stockton, CA
WCC regular season
December 28, 2024; 5:00 p.m., ESPN+		at Saint Mary's	L 60–70	5–10 (0–1)	20 – Ralph	8 – tied	7 – Washington	University Credit Union Pavilion (3,500); Moraga, CA
December 30, 2024; 7:00 p.m., ESPN+		at San Diego	L 65–75	5–11 (0–2)	20 – Fisher	10 – Fisher	4 – Washington	Jenny Craig Pavilion (627); San Diego, CA
January 2, 2025; 7:00 p.m., ESPN+		San Francisco	L 81–89	5–12 (0–3)	25 – Fisher	7 – Gardner	2 – tied	Alex G. Spanos Center (1,227); Stockton, CA
January 4, 2025; 4:00 p.m., ESPN+		Pepperdine	L 70–87	5–13 (0–4)	18 – Fisher	6 – Ralph	7 – Washington	Alex G. Spanos Center (1,158); Stockton, CA
January 9, 2025; 6:30 p.m., ESPN+		at Washington State	W 95–94 ^{OT}	6–13 (1–4)	40 – Washington	5 – Smith	6 – Washington	Beasley Coliseum (3,715); Pullman, WA
January 11, 2025; 7:00 p.m., ESPN+		Oregon State	L 55–91	6–14 (1–5)	13 – Washington	4 – Fisher	3 – tied	Alex G. Spanos Center (1,188); Stockton, CA
January 16, 2025; 7:00 p.m., ESPN+		at Portland	L 81–84 ^{OT}	6–15 (1–6)	26 – Ralph	11 – Ralph	12 – Washington	Chiles Center (1,132); Portland, OR
January 23, 2025; 7:00 p.m., ESPN+		Loyola Marymount	L 68–73	6–16 (1–7)	21 – Fisher	17 – Ralph	6 – Washington	Alex G. Spanos Center (1,064); Stockton, CA
January 25, 2025; 7:00 p.m., ESPN+		at Pepperdine	L 44–60	6–17 (1–8)	19 – Fisher	8 – Washington	3 – Ralph	Firestone Fieldhouse (430); Malibu, CA
January 30, 2025; 7:00 p.m., ESPN+		Washington State	W 70–68	7–17 (2–8)	18 – Ralph	8 – Ralph	8 – Washington	Alex G. Spanos Center (1,437); Stockton, CA
February 1, 2025; 4:00 p.m., ESPN+		at Santa Clara	L 49–83	7–18 (2–9)	14 – Fisher	4 – tied	4 – Washington	Leavey Center (1,889); Santa Clara, CA
February 6, 2025; 7:00 p.m., ESPN+		San Diego	W 71–69	8–18 (3–9)	19 – Washington	7 – Ralph	4 – Washington	Alex G. Spanos Center (1,284); Stockton, CA
February 8, 2025; 4:00 p.m., ESPN+		Gonzaga	L 61–78	8–19 (3–10)	22 – Washington	8 – Washington	3 – Washington	Alex G. Spanos Center (3,178); Stockton, CA
February 13, 2025; 7:00 p.m., ESPN+		at Loyola Marymount	W 83–58	9–19 (4–10)	31 – Washington	10 – Washington	6 – Washington	Gersten Pavilion (861); Los Angeles, CA
February 15, 2025; 2:00 p.m., ESPN+		at Oregon State	L 65–79	9–20 (4–11)	16 – Washington	6 – Washington	5 – Washington	Gill Coliseum (4,162); Corvallis, OR
February 20, 2025; 7:00 p.m., ESPN+		at San Francisco	L 58–71	9–21 (4–12)	23 – Fisher	9 – Keinys	5 – Washington	Sobrato Center (2,939); San Francisco, CA
February 22, 2025; 4:00 p.m., ESPN+		Portland	L 73–81	9–22 (4–13)	23 – Fisher	11 – Ralph	4 – Ralph	Alex G. Spanos Center (1,612); Stockton, CA
March 1, 2025; 4:00 p.m., ESPN+		Santa Clara	L 66–97	9–23 (4–14)	19 – Washington	8 – tied	6 – Washington	Alex G. Spanos Center (1,554); Stockton, CA
WCC tournament
March 6, 2025; 2:30 p.m., ESPN+	(10)	vs. (11) San Diego; First round	L 77–81	9–24	23 – Ralph	11 – Ralph	8 – Washington	Orleans Arena (1,011); Paradise, NV
*Non-conference game. ^{#}Rankings from AP poll. (#) Tournament seedings in parentheses. All times are in Pacific.
