= Ben Gregg =

American basketball player (born 2002)

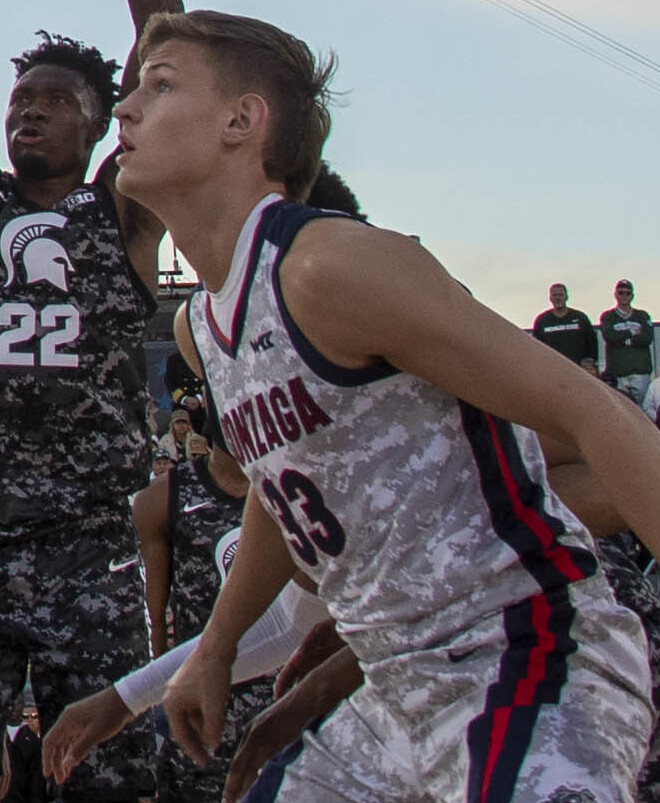
- Gregg in 2022

No. 12 – SIG Strasbourg
- Position: Power forward
- League: LNB Élite; Champions League

Personal information
- Born: October 14, 2002 (age 24) Spokane, Washington, U.S.
- Listed height: 6 ft 10 in (2.08 m)
- Listed weight: 225 lb (102 kg)

Career information
- High school: Columbia Christian (Portland, Oregon); Clackamas (Clackamas, Oregon)
- College: Gonzaga (2020–2025)
- NBA draft: 2025: undrafted
- Playing career: 2025–present

Career history
- 2025–present: SIG Strasbourg

Benjamin Isaiah Gregg (born October 14, 2002) is an American professional basketball player for SIG Strasbourg of the French LNB Pro A and the Champions League. He played college basketball for the Gonzaga Bulldogs.

== College career ==
=== Gonzaga ===
Gregg played five seasons at Gonzaga from 2020 to 2025, averaging 6.2 points, 3.8 rebounds, and 0.9 assists over 141 collegiate appearances and 39 starts.

As a member of the Bulldogs, Gregg was part of several highly successful teams, including the 2021 team that went to the 2021 national championship game at the 2021 NCAA tournament, the 2022 Sweet 16 team, the 2023 Elite 8 team, 2024 Sweet 16 team, and the 2025 squad that made the NCAA Round of 32.

== Professional career ==
Gregg joined the Boston Celtics summer league team for the 2025 NBA Summer League.

On July 7, 2025, it was reported that Gregg had signed with SIG Strasbourg in France.

== Career statistics ==
Legend
GP	Games played	GS	Games started	MPG	Minutes per game
FG%	Field goal percentage	3P%	3-point field goal percentage	FT%	Free throw percentage
RPG	Rebounds per game	APG	Assists per game	SPG	Steals per game
BPG	Blocks per game	PPG	Points per game	**Bold**	Career high

=== College ===
Year	Team	GP	GS	MPG	FG%	3P%	FT%	RPG	APG	SPG	BPG	PPG
2020–21	Gonzaga	18	0	3.1	.412	.250	.333	1.0	.1	.0	.2	.9
2021–22	Gonzaga	17	0	6.3	.370	.308	.286	2.0	.6	.2	.5	2.4
2022–23	Gonzaga	**36**	0	11.9	.504	**.377**	.762	3.0	.7	.5	**.7**	5.1
2023–24	Gonzaga	35	19	**23.6**	.541	**.377**	.729	**5.7**	1.2	**1.2**	**.7**	9.0
2024–25	Gonzaga	35	**20**	19.9	**.571**	.271	**.791**	4.9	**1.3**	.7	.4	**9.1**
Career		141	39	15.0	.526	.341	.740	3.8	.9	.6	.5	6.2
