= Braden Huff =

American basketball player (born 2003)

No. 34 – Gonzaga Bulldogs
- Position: Power forward
- Conference: Pac-12 Conference

Personal information
- Born: August 28, 2003 (age 23)
- Listed height: 6 ft 10 in (2.08 m)
- Listed weight: 250 lb (113 kg)

Career information
- High school: Glenbard West (Glen Ellyn, Illinois)
- College: Gonzaga (2023–present)

Career highlights
- WCC All-Freshman Team (2024); Illinois Mr. Basketball (2022)

Braden Huff (born August 28, 2003) is an American college basketball player for the Gonzaga Bulldogs of the Pac-12 Conference.

== Early life ==
Huff attended Glenbard West High School, where he averaged 17.5 points, 6.5 rebounds, and 2.8 assists per game as a senior. He led Glenbard West to a state title and was named Illinois Mr. Basketball. Coming out of high school, Huff was rated as a four-star recruit, the 33rd overall forward, and the 4th ranked prospect in the state of Illinois for the 2022 recruiting class. Huff committed to play college basketball for the Gonzaga Bulldogs over offers from schools such as Michigan State, Minnesota, Northwestern, Iowa, Illinois, Creighton, Vanderbilt, Virginia Tech, and Wisconsin.

== College career ==
=== 2022–23 season ===
As a freshman in 2022–23, Huff took a redshirt and did not appear in any games.

=== 2023–24 season ===
In his collegiate debut in Gonzaga's season opener, Huff came off the bench to score 19 points and grab nine rebounds in a double-digit comeback win over Yale. On January 20, 2024, he scored a career-high 26 points in a win over San Diego. Against Portland, Huff recorded 25 points, seven rebounds and three assists. In the next game, a road win versus Kentucky, he scored 12 points. Huff was named to the WCC all-freshman team. In the second round of the 2024 NCAA tournament, Huff scored 11 points in a win over Kansas.

== Career statistics ==
Legend
| GP | Games played | GS | Games started | MPG | Minutes per game |
| FG% | Field goal percentage | 3P% | 3-point field goal percentage | FT% | Free throw percentage |
| RPG | Rebounds per game | APG | Assists per game | SPG | Steals per game |
| BPG | Blocks per game | PPG | Points per game | **Bold** | Career high |

=== College ===
| Year | Team | GP | GS | MPG | FG% | 3P% | FT% | RPG | APG | SPG | BPG | PPG |
|---|---|---|---|---|---|---|---|---|---|---|---|---|
| 2022–23 | Gonzaga | Redshirt | | | | | | | | | | |
| 2023–24 | Gonzaga | **35** | 0 | 13.5 | .598 | **.338** | .554 | 3.4 | .5 | .3 | **.7** | 9.3 |
| 2024–25 | Gonzaga | **35** | 4 | 16.7 | .577 | .281 | **.702** | 3.4 | 1.1 | .3 | .6 | 11.0 |
| 2025–26 | Gonzaga | 18 | **18** | **25.4** | **.662** | .333 | .575 | **5.6** | **1.5** | **.4** | .5 | **17.8** |
| Career | | 88 | 22 | 17.2 | .609 | .322 | .608 | 3.8 | .9 | .3 | .6 | 11.7 |
