= 2025 West Coast Conference men's basketball tournament =

American college basketball postseason tournament

- Classification: Division I
- Season: 2024–25
- Teams: 11
- Site: Orleans Arena; Paradise, Nevada
- Champions: Gonzaga (22nd title)
- Winning coach: Mark Few (20th title)
- MVP: Graham Ike (Gonzaga)
- Television: ESPN+, ESPN2, ESPN

2024–25 West Coast Conference men's basketball standings
	Conf.				Overall
Team	W		L	PCT	W		L	PCT
No. 24 Saint Mary's	17	–	1	.944	29	–	6	.829
No. 23 Gonzaga †	14	–	4	.778	26	–	9	.743
San Francisco	13	–	5	.722	25	–	10	.714
Santa Clara	12	–	6	.667	21	–	13	.618
Oregon State	10	–	8	.556	20	–	13	.606
Washington State	8	–	10	.444	19	–	15	.559
Loyola Marymount	8	–	10	.444	17	–	15	.531
Portland	7	–	11	.389	12	–	20	.375
Pepperdine	4	–	14	.222	13	–	22	.371
Pacific	4	–	14	.222	9	–	24	.273
San Diego	2	–	16	.111	6	–	27	.182
† 2025 WCC tournament winner Rankings from AP poll

The 2025 West Coast Conference men's basketball Tournament was the postseason men's basketball tournament for the West Coast Conference for the 2024–25 season. All tournament games were played at Orleans Arena in the Las Vegas-area community of Paradise, Nevada, from March 6–11, 2025. The winner, Gonzaga, received the conference's automatic bid to the 2025 NCAA tournament.

== Seeds ==
All 11 conference teams participated in the tournament. Teams were seeded by record within the conference, with ties being broken by head-to-head results. The conference adopted a stepladder format for the tournament, with the top two seeds receiving byes to the semifinals, the third and fourth seeds to the quarterfinals, and so on.

Seed	School	Conf. record	Tiebreaker(s)
1	Saint Mary’s	17–1	
2	Gonzaga	14–4	
3	San Francisco	13–5	
4	Santa Clara	12–6	
5	Oregon State	10–8	
6	Washington State	8–10	1–0 vs. Loyola Marymount
7	Loyola Marymount	8–10	0–1 vs. Washington State
8	Portland	7–11	
9	Pepperdine	4–14	2–0 vs. Pacific
10	Pacific	4–14	0–2 vs. Pepperdine
11	San Diego	2–16	

== Schedule and results ==
Game	Time	Matchup	Score	Television
First Round - Thursday, March 6
1	2:30 pm	No. 10 Pacific vs. No. 11 San Diego	77–81	ESPN+
Second Round - Friday, March 7
2	6:00 pm	No. 8 Portland vs. No. 9 Pepperdine	73–86	ESPN+
3	8:30 pm	No. 7 Loyola Marymount vs. No. 11 San Diego	100–74	ESPN+
Third Round – Saturday, March 8
4	6:00 pm	No. 5 Oregon State vs. No. 9 Pepperdine	73–77	ESPN+
5	8:30 pm	No. 6 Washington State vs. No. 7 Loyola Marymount	94–77	ESPN+
Quarterfinals - Sunday, March 9
6	5:30 pm	No. 4 Santa Clara vs. No. 9 Pepperdine	76–78	ESPN2
7	8:00 pm	No. 3 San Francisco vs. No. 6 Washington State	86–75	ESPN2
Semifinals - Monday, March 10
8	6:00 pm	No. 1 Saint Mary’s vs. No. 9 Pepperdine	74–59	ESPN
9	8:30 pm	No. 2 Gonzaga vs. No. 3 San Francisco	85–76	ESPN2
Final – Tuesday, March 11
10	6:00 pm	No. 1 Saint Mary’s vs. No. 2 Gonzaga	51–58	ESPN
*Game times in PST through the third round and PDT from the quarterfinals onward. Rankings denote tournament seed. Reference:

== Bracket ==
First round Thursday, March 6
10	Pacific	77
11	San Diego	81

Second round Friday, March 7
8	Portland	73
9	Pepperdine	86
7	Loyola Marymount	100
11	San Diego	74

Third round Saturday, March 8
5	Oregon State	73
9	Pepperdine	77
6	Washington State	94
7	Loyola Marymount	77

Quarterfinals; Sunday, March 9
4	Santa Clara	76
9	Pepperdine	78
3	San Francisco	86
6	Washington State	75

Semifinals; Monday, March 10
1	Saint Mary’s	74
9	Pepperdine	59
2	Gonzaga	85
3	San Francisco	76

Championship; Tuesday, March 11
1	Saint Mary’s	51
2	Gonzaga	58

== See also ==
- 2025 West Coast Conference women's basketball tournament
