= 2024 Diamond Head Classic =

College basketball competition

- Season: 2024–25
- Teams: 8
- Finals site: Stan Sheriff Center, Honolulu, Hawaii
- Champions: Nebraska (1st title)
- Runner-up: Oregon State (1st title game)
- Semifinalists: Hawai'i (7th semifinal); Oakland (1st semifinal)
- Winning coach: Fred Hoiberg (2nd title)
- MVP: Brice Williams (Nebraska)

The 2024 Diamond Head Classic was a mid-season eight-team college basketball tournament that was played on December 22, 23, and 25 at the Stan Sheriff Center in Honolulu, Hawaii. It was the fifteenth annual Diamond Head Classic tournament, and was part of the 2024–25 NCAA Division I men's basketball season. The 2024 field was announced in July, and featured Charleston, Charlotte, Hawaii, Loyola Chicago, Murray State, Nebraska, Oakland and Oregon State.

== Bracket ==
* – Denotes overtime period

5th place game December 25
Charleston | 84
Charlotte | 81
7th place game
Loyola Chicago | 68
Murray State | 71

Consolation 2nd Round; December 23
Charleston | 77
Loyola Chicago | 68
Murray State | 90
Charlotte | 94**

First Round; December 22
Oregon State | 74
Charleston | 65
Loyola Chicago | 71
Oakland | 72
Nebraska | 66
Murray State | 49
Charlotte | 61
Hawaiʻi | 78

Semifinals; December 23
Oregon State | 80*
Oakland | 74
Nebraska | 69
Hawaiʻi | 55

Championship; December 25
Oregon State | 66
Nebraska | 78
3rd place game
Oakland | 70
Hawaiʻi | 73*

Notes: All games played at the Stan Sheriff Center in Honolulu, Hawaiʻi.
