= 2024–25 Portland Pilots men's basketball team =

American college basketball season

2024–25 Portland Pilots men's basketball
- Conference: West Coast Conference
- Record: 12–20 (7–11 WCC)
- Head coach: Shantay Legans (4th season)
- Associate head coach: Bobby Suarez
- Assistant coaches: T.J. Lipold; Arturo Ormond
- Home arena: Chiles Center

2024–25 West Coast Conference men's basketball standings
	Conf.				Overall
Team	W		L	PCT	W		L	PCT
No. 24 Saint Mary's	17	–	1	.944	29	–	6	.829
No. 23 Gonzaga †	14	–	4	.778	26	–	9	.743
San Francisco	13	–	5	.722	25	–	10	.714
Santa Clara	12	–	6	.667	21	–	13	.618
Oregon State	10	–	8	.556	20	–	13	.606
Washington State	8	–	10	.444	19	–	15	.559
Loyola Marymount	8	–	10	.444	17	–	15	.531
Portland	7	–	11	.389	12	–	20	.375
Pepperdine	4	–	14	.222	13	–	22	.371
Pacific	4	–	14	.222	9	–	24	.273
San Diego	2	–	16	.111	6	–	27	.182
† 2025 WCC tournament winner Rankings from AP poll

The 2024–25 Portland Pilots men's basketball team represented the University of Portland during the 2024–25 NCAA Division I men's basketball season. The Pilots, led by fourth-year head coach Shantay Legans, played their home games at the Chiles Center as members of the West Coast Conference.

== Previous season ==
The Pilots finished the 2023–24 season 12–21, 5–11 in WCC play to finish in a three-way tie for sixth place. As the No. 6 seed in the WCC Tournament, they defeated Loyola Marymount in the second round, before losing to San Francisco in the quarterfinals.

== Offseason ==
=== Departures ===
Name	Number	Pos.	Height	Weight	Year	Hometown	Reason for departure
Thomas Oosterbroek	1	F	6'7"	235	Junior	Amsterdam, Netherlands	Transferred to Dominican (CA)
Tyler Robertson	2	G/F	6'6"	225	GS senior	Melbourne, Australia	Graduated
Yuto Yamanouchi-Williams	3	C	6'10"	225	Sophomore	Aizuwakamatsu, Japan	Transferred to Nevada
Juan Sebasitan Gorosito	4	G	6'1"	150	Sophomore	Ceres, Santa Fe, Argentina	Transferred to Ball State
Alimamy Koroma	14	F	6'8"	220	GS senior	Freetown, Sierra Leona	Graduated
Tyler Harris	15	G	6'8"	185	Freshman	Hayward, CA	Transferred to Washington
Drew Stack	20	G	6'3"	175	(redshirt) Freshman	Madison, NJ	Walk-on; transferred to Hartford
Noah Jordan	21	F	6'7"	215	GS senior	Indianapolis, IN	Graduated
Cyprian Hyde	22	F	6'11"	230	Freshman	Oceanside, CA	Transferred to VMI
Vasilije Vučinić	23	F	6'11"	225	Junior	Bijelo Polje, Montenegro	Transferred to Weber State
Andrew Younan	33	G	6'4"	175	(redshirt) Freshman	Westlake Village, CA	Walk-on; transferred

=== Incoming transfers ===
Name	Number	Pos.	Height	Weight	Year	Hometown	Previous school
Jermaine Ballisager Webb	0	C	7'0"	250	Junior	Stjær, Denmark	American
Mezziah Oakman	1	C	7'0"	230	(redshirt) Junior	New York, NY	UC Santa Barbara
Max Mackinnon	3	G	6'5"	205	Junior	Brisbane, Australia	Elon

=== 2024 recruiting class ===
College recruiting
Name	Hometown	School	Height	Weight	Commit date
Todd Jones #81 PF	New Orleans, LA	Isidore Newman School	6 ft 7 in (2.01 m)	195 lb (88 kg)	Feb 1, 2024
Todd Jones #81 PF	Recruit ratings: Scout: Rivals: 247Sports: ESPN: (81)				
Jinup Dobuol; SF	St. Paul, MN	PHHoenix Prep	6 ft 8 in (2.03 m)	180 lb (82 kg)	Feb 26, 2024
Jinup Dobuol; SF	Recruit ratings: Scout: Rivals: 247Sports: (0)				
Mikah Ballew; SG	Palmdale, CA	Southern California Academy	6 ft 5 in (1.96 m)	200 lb (91 kg)	Mar 27, 2023
Mikah Ballew; SG	Recruit ratings: Scout: Rivals: (0)				
Austin Rapp; SF	Melbourne, Australia	N/A	6 ft 10 in (2.08 m)	N/A	Apr 20, 2024
Austin Rapp; SF	Recruit ratings: Scout: Rivals: 247Sports: (0)				
Overall recruit ranking: Scout: nr Rivals: nr ESPN: nr
Note: In many cases, Scout, Rivals, 247Sports, On3, and ESPN may conflict in their listings of height and weight.; In these cases, the average was taken. ESPN grades are on a 100-point scale.; Sources: "Portland Pilots 2024 Basketball Commitments". Rivals.; "2024 Portland Pilots Basketball Commits". Scout.; "ESPN 2024 Portland Pilots Basketball recruits". ESPN.; "Scout.com Team Recruiting Rankings". Scout.; "2024 Team Ranking". Rivals.

== Roster ==
2024–25 Portland Pilots men's basketball team
Players
Coaches

Pos.	#	Name	Height	Weight	Year	Previous school	Hometown
C	0	Jermaine Ballisager Webb	7 ft 1 in (2.16 m)	250 lb (113 kg)	Jr	Montverde; American	Stjær, Denmark
C	1	Mezziah Oakman	7 ft 0 in (2.13 m)	230 lb (104 kg)	RS Jr	Mount Diablo HS; UC Santa Barbara	New York, NY
G	3	Max Mackinnon	6 ft 6 in (1.98 m)	200 lb (91 kg)	Jr	Lake Ginninderra College; Elon	Brisbane, Australia
G	4	Jinup Dobuol	6 ft 8 in (2.03 m)	180 lb (82 kg)	Fr	Phoenix Prep (AZ)	Saint Paul, MN
G	5	Chris Austin	6 ft 4 in (1.93 m)	210 lb (95 kg)	GS	Maranatha HS; Fordham	Pasadena, CA
G	7	Vukasin Masic	6 ft 5 in (1.96 m)	210 lb (95 kg)	RS Sr	Hoosac School; Maine	Belgrade, Serbia
G	8	Preston Lee (W)	5 ft 11 in (1.8 m)	185 lb (84 kg)	Fr	Orange Lutheran HS	Laguna Hills, CA
G	9	Carlin Briggs (W)	6 ft 7 in (2.01 m)	190 lb (86 kg)	Fr	Australia Centre of Excellence	Melbourne, Australia
F	10	Coleman Lemke (W)	6 ft 8 in (2.03 m)	190 lb (86 kg)	RS Jr	Faith Lutheran HS	Las Vegas, NV
G	11	Vincent Delano	6 ft 2 in (1.88 m)	175 lb (79 kg)	RS Fr	Arizona Compass Prep	Phoenix, AZ
G	12	Kelson Gebbers (W)	6 ft 6 in (1.98 m)	200 lb (91 kg)	RS Fr	Brewster HS	Brewster, WA
G	13	Jude Harris (W)	6 ft 5 in (1.96 m)	205 lb (93 kg)	RS Fr	Salesian HS	Manhattan Beach, CA
G	20	Wyatt Miller (W)	5 ft 10 in (1.78 m)	165 lb (75 kg)	Fr	Utah Prep Academy	Santa Barbara, CA
G	21	NaVaughn Long (W)	6 ft 6 in (1.98 m)	180 lb (82 kg)	Fr	Granada HS	Livermore, CA
F	22	Austin Rapp	6 ft 10 in (2.08 m)	230 lb (104 kg)	Fr		Melbourne, Australia
F	23	Todd Jones	6 ft 9 in (2.06 m)	205 lb (93 kg)	Fr	Isidore Newman HS	New Orleans, LA
F	24	Bol Dengdit	6 ft 11 in (2.11 m)	210 lb (95 kg)	RS So	NBA Global Academy	Melbourne, Australia
G	44	Mikah Ballew	6 ft 5 in (1.96 m)	200 lb (91 kg)	Fr	SoCal Academy	Palmdale, CA

Head coach

- Shantay Legans (Fresno State)

Assistant coach(es)

- Bobby Suarez (Florida Gulf Coast)
- T.J. Lipold (Westmont College)
- Arturo Ormond (UTPA)

Legend

- (C) Team captain
- (S) Suspended
- (I) Ineligible
- (W) Walk-on
- Injured
- Current redshirt

Roster

== Schedule and results ==
Date time, TV	Rank^{#}	Opponent^{#}	Result	Record	High points	High rebounds	High assists	Site (attendance) city, state
Non-conference regular season
November 6, 2024*; 7:00 p.m., ESPN+		Lewis & Clark	W 83–70	1–0	20 – Mackinnon	10 – Jones	5 – Tied	Chiles Center (1,006); Portland, OR
November 9, 2024*; 3:00 p.m., ESPN+		UC Santa Barbara	L 53–94	1–1	24 – Masic	7 – Rapp	5 – Masic	Chiles Center (1,304); Portland, OR
November 12, 2024*; 8:00 p.m., BTN		at Oregon	L 70–80 ^{OT}	1–2	12 – Tied	10 – Jones	5 – Rapp	Matthew Knight Arena (5,260); Eugene, OR
November 16, 2024*; 2:00 p.m., ESPN+		at Long Beach State	W 63–61	2–2	16 – Rapp	7 – Masic	6 – Masic	Walter Pyramid (1,945); Long Beach, CA
November 21, 2024*; 11:30 a.m., ESPN2		vs. South Florida; Myrtle Beach Invitational Quarterfinals	L 68–74	2–3	17 – Mackinnon	8 – Tied	5 – Mackinnon	HTC Center (1,454); Conway, SC
November 22, 2024*; 8:30 a.m., ESPNU		vs. Ohio; Myrtle Beach Invitational Consolation Round	L 73–85	2–4	17 – Masic	7 – Tied	2 – Tied	HTC Center (708); Conway, SC
November 24, 2024*; 7:30 a.m., ESPNU		vs. Princeton; Myrtle Beach Invitational 7th place game	L 67–94	2–5	12 – Tied	5 – Mackinnon	4 – Masic	HTC Center (627); Conway, SC
December 1, 2024*; 2:00 p.m., KRCW/ESPN+		Denver	W 101–90 ^{2OT}	3–5	27 – Masic	7 – Austin	5 – Tied	Chiles Center (1,049); Portland, OR
December 6, 2024*; 4:00 p.m., ESPN+		at Kent State	L 57–76	3–6	12 – Dengdit	6 – Mackinnon	4 – Masic	MAC Center (1,374); Kent, OH
December 10, 2024*; 7:00 p.m., ESPN+		Kansas City	L 64–69	3–7	18 – Rapp	10 – Rapp	4 – Austin	Chiles Center (781); Portland, OR
December 16, 2024*; 7:00 p.m., ESPN+		Willamette	W 100–69	4–7	19 – Tied	8 – Tied	6 – Mackinnon	Chiles Center (705); Portland, OR
December 18, 2024*; 7:00 p.m., ESPN+		Cal State Bakersfield	L 64–81	4–8	21 – Rapp	6 – Mackinnon	5 – Delano	Chiles Center (732); Portland, OR
December 21, 2024*; 1:00 p.m., ESPN+		Lafayette	W 74–64	5–8	20 – Austin	8 – Rapp	3 – Tied	Chiles Center (883); Portland, OR
WCC regular season
December 28, 2024; 5:00 p.m., KRCW/ESPN+		Washington State	L 73–89	5–9 (0–1)	22 – Mackinnon	6 – Rapp	4 – Rapp	Chiles Center (2,228); Portland, OR
December 30, 2024; 6:30 p.m., ESPN+		at Oregon State	L 79–89	5–10 (0–2)	22 – Rapp	6 – Rapp	6 – Masic	Gill Coliseum (2,981); Corvallis, OR
January 2, 2025; 6:00 p.m., ESPN+		at No. 19 Gonzaga; Community Cancer Fund Classic	L 50–81	5–11 (0–3)	12 – Delano	8 – Dengdit	3 – Mackinnon	Spokane Arena (9,022); Spokane, WA
January 4, 2025; 7:00 p.m., ESPN+		Saint Mary's	L 58–81	5–12 (0–4)	12 – Mackinnon	8 – Rapp	5 – Rapp	Chiles Center (1,678); Portland, OR
January 9, 2025; 7:00 p.m., ESPN+		at San Francisco	L 72–81	5–13 (0–5)	28 – Mackinnon	8 – Rapp	3 – Tied	Sobrato Center (1,824); San Francisco, CA
January 16, 2025; 7:00 p.m., KRCW/ESPN+		Pacific	W 84–81 ^{OT}	6–13 (1–5)	21 – Dengdit	13 – Dengdit	4 – Mackinnon	Chiles Center (1,132); Portland, OR
January 18, 2025; 3:00 p.m., ESPN+		at Washington State	L 70–92	6–14 (1–6)	23 – Austin	10 – Rapp	4 – Delano	Beasley Coliseum (3,594); Pullman, WA
January 23, 2025; 7:00 p.m., ESPN+		San Diego	W 92–82	7–14 (2–6)	43 – Mackinnon	8 – Rapp	5 – Austin	Chiles Center (1,014); Portland, OR
January 25, 2025; 5:00 p.m., KRCW/ESPN+		Gonzaga	L 62–105	7–15 (2–7)	18 – Mackinnon	5 – Delano	5 – Delano	Chiles Center (4,117); Portland, OR
January 30, 2025; 7:00 p.m., ESPN+		at Loyola Marymount	L 63–88	7–16 (2–8)	14 – Rapp	6 – Ballew	6 – Masic	Gersten Pavilion (1,049); Los Angeles, CA
February 1, 2025; 7:00 p.m., ESPN+		at Pepperdine	W 84–64	8–16 (3–8)	24 – Mackinnon	8 – Dengdit	7 – Mackinnon	Firestone Fieldhouse (385); Malibu, CA
February 6, 2025; 7:00 p.m., ESPN+		Santa Clara	L 50–97	8–17 (3–9)	12 – Austin	10 – Rapp	3 – Dengdit	Chiles Center (1,044); Portland, OR
February 13, 2025; 7:00 p.m., KRCW/ESPN+		Oregon State	W 84–72	9–17 (4–9)	24 – Rapp	6 – Austin	6 – Tied	Chiles Center; Portland, OR
February 15, 2025; 7:00 p.m., ESPN+		Loyola Marymount	W 89–78	10–17 (5–9)	29 – Mackinnon	9 – Masic	6 – Rapp	Chiles Center (1,751); Portland, OR
February 19, 2025; 7:00 p.m., ESPN+		at Saint Mary's	L 66–79	10–18 (5–10)	15 – Masic	8 – Masic	8 – Mackinnon	University Credit Union Pavilion (3,392); Moraga, CA
February 22, 2025; 4:00 p.m., ESPN+		at Pacific	W 81–73	11–18 (6–10)	24 – Austin	7 – Austin	4 – Tied	Alex G. Spanos Center (1,612); Stockton, CA
February 27, 2025; 7:00 p.m., ESPN+		Pepperdine	W 87–67	12–18 (7–10)	27 – Mackinnon	10 – Rapp	6 – Masic	Chiles Center (1,006); Portland, OR
March 1, 2025; 2:00 p.m., ESPN+		at San Diego	L 80–82	12–19 (7–11)	18 – Tied	10 – Rapp	5 – Rapp	Jenny Craig Pavilion (987); San Diego, CA
WCC tournament
March 7, 2025; 6:00 p.m., ESPN+	(8)	vs. (9) Pepperdine; Second round	L 73–86	12–20	26 – Masic	7 – Rapp	5 – Mackinnon	Orleans Arena (1,200); Paradise, NV
*Non-conference game. ^{#}Rankings from AP Poll. (#) Tournament seedings in parentheses. All times are in Pacific Time.
