= Stefan Todorović (basketball) =

Serbian basketball player (born 2002)

Ilirija
- Position: Small forward / shooting guard
- League: Slovenian League; ABA League

Personal information
- Born: December 4, 2002 (age 23) Belgrade, Serbia, FR Yugoslavia
- Listed height: 6 ft 8 in (2.03 m)
- Listed weight: 209 lb (95 kg)

Career information
- High school: Prolific Prep (Napa, California)
- College: SMU (2021–2023); San Francisco (2023–2024); Pepperdine (2024–2025)
- NBA draft: 2025: undrafted
- Playing career: 2025–present

Career history
- 2025–2026: Maine Celtics
- 2026: Texas Legends
- 2026–present: Ilirija

Stefan Todorović (Serbian Cyrillic: Стефан Тодоровић; born 4 December 2002) is a Serbian professional basketball player for Ilirija of the Slovenian League and the ABA League. He played college basketball for the SMU Mustangs, San Francisco Dons, and Pepperdine Waves.

== Early life ==
Todorovic started playing basketball when he was seven years old. By the time he was 17, he was playing professional for Partizan during the 2019-2020 season. He moved to California to play for Prolific Prep in 2020-2021.

== Professional career ==
=== Maine Celtics (2025–2026) ===
On October 25, 2025, Todorović was selected with the seventh overall pick by the Motor City Cruise in the 2025 NBA G League draft. However, he was traded to the Maine Celtics later that same day in exchange for a 2027 NBA G League first-round pick.

In November 2025, Todorovic was officially named to the Maine Celtics opening night roster.

=== Ilirija (2026–present) ===
On August 11, 2026, Todorović signed with Ilirija of the Slovenian League and the ABA League.

== National team career ==
He represented the Serbia U19 national team at the 2021 FIBA Under-19 Basketball World Cup. Over five tournament games, Todorović averaged 3.8 points and 2.2 rebounds per game.

== Career statistics ==
Legend
GP	Games played	GS	Games started	MPG	Minutes per game
FG%	Field goal percentage	3P%	3-point field goal percentage	FT%	Free throw percentage
RPG	Rebounds per game	APG	Assists per game	SPG	Steals per game
BPG	Blocks per game	PPG	Points per game	**Bold**	Career high

=== College ===
Year	Team	GP	GS	MPG	FG%	3P%	FT%	RPG	APG	SPG	BPG	PPG
2021–22	SMU	24	0	8.0	.423	**.435**	.556	1.2	.3	—	—	2.9
2022–23	SMU	31	7	16.6	.352	.316	.822	2.4	.4	.5	**.2**	5.5
2023–24	San Francisco	22	4	9.7	.400	.289	**.882**	1.5	.4	.3	—	3.8
2024–25	Pepperdine	**35**	**35**	**34.3**	**.432**	.366	.857	**5.5**	**2.1**	**1.0**	.1	**18.3**
Career		112	46	18.9	.413	.352	.842	2.9	.9	.5	.1	8.6
