= Michael Ajayi =

American basketball player (June 23 born 2003)

No. 10 – Charlotte Hornets
- Position: Shooting guard
- League: NBA

Personal information
- Born: May 23, 2003 (age 23) Kent, Washington, U.S.
- Listed height: 6 ft 7 in (2.01 m)
- Listed weight: 245 lb (111 kg)

Career information
- High school: Kentwood (Covington, Washington)
- College: Pierce (2021–2023); Pepperdine (2023–2024); Gonzaga (2024–2025); Butler (2025–2026)
- NBA draft: 2026: undrafted
- Playing career: 2026–present

Career history
- 2026–present: Charlotte Hornets
- 2026–present: →Greensboro Swarm

Career highlights
- First-team All-WCC (2024); First-team All-Big East (2026)
- Stats at NBA.com
- Stats at Basketball Reference

Michael Ajayi (born May 23, 2003) is an American basketball player for the Charlotte Hornets of the National Basketball Association (NBA), on a two-way contract with the Greensboro Swarm of the NBA G League. He played college basketball for the Pierce Raiders, Pepperdine Waves, Gonzaga Bulldogs and Butler Bulldogs.

== Early life and high school ==
Ajayi attended Kentwood High School in Covington, Washington, and committed to play college basketball at Pierce College.

== College career ==
=== Pierce College ===
In two seasons at Pierce College from 2021 to 2023, Ajayi made 27 starts, averaging 22.7 points in 34.2 minutes per game. After the 2022–23 season, he entered the NCAA transfer portal.

=== Pepperdine ===
Ajayi transferred to play for the Pepperdine Waves. He finished the 2023–24 season averaging 17.2 points and 9.9 rebounds per game, earning first-team all-WCC conference honors. After the season, Ajayi entered the NCAA transfer portal.

=== Gonzaga ===
Ajayi transferred to play for the Gonzaga Bulldogs. On November 10, 2024, he brought down 12 rebounds in a victory against Arizona State. On January 2, 2025, Ajayi recorded five points and 15 rebounds in a win over Portland. He finished the 2024–25 season averaging 6.5 points and 5.4 rebounds per game. After the season, Ajayi once again entered the NCAA transfer portal.

=== Butler ===
Ajayi transferred to play for the Butler Bulldogs. On November 5, 2025, he tallied 24 points and 12 rebounds in a victory versus Southern Indiana. On November 21, Ajayi recorded 15 points and 14 rebounds in a victory over South Carolina. On November 23, he notched 17 points, 14 rebounds, and three blocks in a win against Virginia. On December 20, Ajayi recorded 19 points and 20 rebounds in a win against Northwestern.

== Professional career ==
After going undrafted in the 2026 NBA draft, Ajayi signed a two-way contract with the Charlotte Hornets.
