= Graham Ike =

American basketball player (born 2002)

No. 45 – Golden State Warriors
- Position: Power forward / center
- League: NBA

Personal information
- Born: August 3, 2002 (age 24) Aurora, Colorado, U.S.
- Listed height: 6 ft 10 in (2.08 m)
- Listed weight: 245 lb (111 kg)

Career information
- High school: Overland (Aurora, Colorado)
- College: Wyoming (2020–2022); Gonzaga (2023–2026)
- NBA draft: 2026: undrafted
- Playing career: 2026–present

Career history
- 2026–present: Golden State Warriors
- 2026–present: →Santa Cruz Warriors

Career highlights
- Third-team All-American – AP, NABC (2026); WCC Player of the Year (2026); 3× First-team All-WCC (2024–2026); First-team All-Mountain West (2022); 2× WCC tournament MOP (2025, 2026)
- Stats at NBA.com
- Stats at Basketball Reference

Graham Ike (/iːkeɪ/ EE-kay; born August 3, 2002) is an American professional basketball player for the Golden State Warriors of the National Basketball Association (NBA), on a two-way contract with the Santa Cruz Warriors of the NBA G League. He played college basketball for the Wyoming Cowboys and the Gonzaga Bulldogs.

== Early life and high school career ==
Ike grew up in Aurora, Colorado and attended Overland High School. He was named second-team All-Colorado after averaging 17.6 points per game and 12 rebounds per game. Ike suffered a serious knee injury during his senior season at Overland. His recruitment from college basketball programs dropped off following his injury and he eventually committed to playing for Wyoming.

== College career ==
Ike missed the first half of his freshman season due to his knee injury. He played in 12 games with seven starts on the season and averaged 11.2 points and 5.4 rebounds per game. As a sophomore, Ike was named first-team All-Mountain West Conference after averaging 19.5 points and 9.6 rebounds per game. He was named the Lute Olson National Player of the Week by CollegeInsider.com on February 14, 2022, after scoring 28 points and grabbing 12 rebounds against Utah State and 25 points and with 18 rebounds against San Jose State.

Ike was named the conference preseason player of the year entering his junior season. He suffered a leg injury during preseason practice that initially caused him to miss the beginning of the 2022–23 season. Midway through the year, Ike opted to sit out the season and use a medical redshirt. He entered the NCAA transfer portal at the end of the season.

Ike ultimately transferred to Gonzaga.

== Professional career ==
On June 25, 2026, after going undrafted in the 2026 NBA draft, Ike signed with the Golden State Warriors. He then joined them for the 2026 NBA Summer League. Ike won the Summer League Championship with the Warriors, beating the Memphis Grizzlies 94–90 in the final.

On September 21, 2026, Ike signed a two-way contract with the Warriors.

== Career statistics ==
Legend
GP	Games played	GS	Games started	MPG	Minutes per game
FG%	Field goal percentage	3P%	3-point field goal percentage	FT%	Free throw percentage
RPG	Rebounds per game	APG	Assists per game	SPG	Steals per game
BPG	Blocks per game	PPG	Points per game	**Bold**	Career high

=== College ===
Year	Team	GP	GS	MPG	FG%	3P%	FT%	RPG	APG	SPG	BPG	PPG
2020–21	Wyoming	12	7	21.3	.602	.000	.683	5.4	.8	.5	.3	11.2
2021–22	Wyoming	33	33	**31.6**	.510	.273	.716	**9.6**	1.3	**.7**	.3	19.5
2022–23	Wyoming	Redshirt										
2023–24	Gonzaga	**35**	**35**	24.1	**.609**	.368	.784	7.4	.9	.6	.7	16.5
2024–25	Gonzaga	**35**	33	22.9	.598	**.394**	**.805**	7.3	1.4	.6	.6	17.3
2025–26	Gonzaga	31	30	31.2	.563	.338	.797	8.0	**2.4**	**.7**	**.8**	**19.9**
Career		146	138	26.8	.568	.348	.765	7.8	1.4	.6	.6	17.6

== See also ==
- List of NCAA Division I men's basketball players with 2,000 points and 1,000 rebounds
