= Jevon Porter =

American basketball player (born 2003)

No. 14 – Loyola Marymount Lions
- Position: Power forward
- Conference: West Coast Conference

Personal information
- Born: June 27, 2003 (age 23) Fishers, Indiana, U.S.
- Listed height: 6 ft 11 in (2.11 m)
- Listed weight: 230 lb (104 kg)

Career information
- High school: Tolton (Columbia, Missouri)
- College: Pepperdine (2022–2024); Loyola Marymount (2024–2025); Missouri (2025–2026); Loyola Marymount (2026–present)
- NBA draft: 2026: undrafted

Jevon Porter (born June 27, 2003) is an American college basketball player for the Loyola Marymount Lions of the West Coast Conference (WCC). He previously played for the Pepperdine Waves and Missouri Tigers.

== Early life ==
Porter attended Tolton High School. He was rated as a three-star recruit and committed to play college basketball for the Pepperdine Waves.

== College career ==
=== Pepperdine ===
On February 9, 2023, Porter notched a 30-point double-double in a win over BYU. He finished his freshman season with averages of 12.1 points and 7.2 rebounds per game, earning West Coast Conference all-freshman honors. In 2023–24, Porter averaged a career-high 16.2 points and 5.9 rebounds per game. After the season, he entered his name into the NCAA transfer portal.

=== Loyola Marymount ===
Porter transferred to play for the Loyola Marymount Lions. On November 27, 2024, he notched 29 points, seven rebounds, and four blocks in a win over Wyoming. During the 2024–25 season, Porter averaged 12.5 points, 7.2 rebounds and 1.9 assists per game. After the season, he entered his name into the NCAA transfer portal.

=== Missouri ===
Porter transferred to play for the Missouri Tigers.

== Personal life ==
Porter is the brother of former Missouri and NBA Champion Michael Porter Jr. and former NBA player Jontay Porter. Two of his sisters, Bri, and Cierra also played for the Missouri women's team. His other brother, Coban played at Denver before being sentenced to six years in prison for a drunk-driving crash that killed a woman in Colorado.

On May 1, 2024, he was arrested for suspicion of DWI in Missouri.
