= Marlon Stewart (basketball coach) =

German basketball head coach

Oregon State Beavers
- Position: Assistant coach
- League: West Coast Conference

Personal information
- Born: March 16, 1985 (age 41) Seattle, Washington, U.S.
- Coaching career: 2008–present

Career history

Coaching
- 2008–2012: California (assistant)
- 2014–2017: Montana (assistant)
- 2017–2018: Hawaii (assistant)
- 2019–present: Oregon State (assistant)

Career highlights
- As assistant coach: Pac-12 tournament winner (2021); Big Sky regular season co-champion (2015)

Marlon Stewart (born March 16, 1985) is an American basketball coach who is currently an assistant coach of Oregon State Beavers under current head coach, Wayne Tinkle.

== Career ==
In 2008, Stewart started his professional coaching duties with California Golden Bears. He also became the video coordinator for head coach Mike Montgomery.

In July 2017, it was announced that Stewart would be part of the coaching staff of the Hawaii Rainbow Warriors.

In 2018, Stewart has been named as the director of basketball operations of Oregon State Beavers. The following year, it has been announced that he would become a part of the coaching staff of Wayne Tinkle, wherein he would become an assistant.

In 2021, he was awarded as a recipient of the "Rising Coach Lifetime Award" by Rising Coaches.
