= 2025–26 Washington State Cougars men's basketball team =

2025–26 Washington State Cougars men's basketball
- Conference: West Coast Conference
- Record: 12–20 (7–11 WCC)
- Head coach: David Riley (2nd season)
- Assistant coaches: Orlando Johnson; Donald Brady; Jerry Brown; Pedro Garcia Rosado; George Galanopoulos
- Home arena: Beasley Coliseum

2025–26 West Coast Conference men's basketball standings
	Conf.				Overall
Team	W		L	PCT	W		L	PCT
No. 18 Gonzaga †	16	–	2	.889	31	–	4	.886
Saint Mary's	16	–	2	.889	27	–	6	.818
Santa Clara	15	–	3	.833	26	–	9	.743
Oregon State	9	–	9	.500	17	–	16	.515
San Francisco	8	–	10	.444	17	–	16	.515
Pacific	8	–	10	.444	18	–	15	.545
Seattle	8	–	10	.444	21	–	14	.600
Washington State	7	–	11	.389	12	–	20	.375
Portland	6	–	12	.333	15	–	19	.441
Loyola Marymount	6	–	12	.333	15	–	17	.469
San Diego	5	–	13	.278	12	–	21	.364
Pepperdine	4	–	14	.222	9	–	23	.281
† 2026 WCC tournament winner Rankings from AP poll

The 2025–26 Washington State Cougars men's basketball team represented Washington State University during the 2025–26 NCAA Division I men's basketball season. The team, led by second-year head coach David Riley, played their home games at the Beasley Coliseum in Pullman, Washington as second-year associate members in the West Coast Conference.

This season was Washington State's last as a West Coast Conference associate member, with the Cougars' primary home of the Pac-12 Conference resuming full operation on July 1, 2026 with seven new members.

== Previous season ==
The Cougars finished the 2024–25 season 19–15, 8–10 in WCC play to finish in a tie for sixth place. As No. 6 seed in the WCC Tournament, they defeated Loyola Marymount in the third round before losing to San Francisco in the quarterfinals. They received an invitation to the CBC. They lost in the first round to Georgetown.

== Offseason ==
=== Departures ===
Name	Number	Pos.	Height	Weight	Year	Hometown	Reason for departure
Cedric Coward	0	F	6'6"	206	Senior	Fresno, CA	Graduated/2025 NBA draft; selected 11th overall by Portland Trail Blazers, traded to Memphis Grizzlies
Marcus Wilson	2	G	6'3"	180	Freshman	Albuquerque, NM	Transferred to UC Davis
Ethan Price	3	F	6'10"	230	Senior	Bury St Edmunds, England	Graduated; signed with the London Lions
LeJuan Watts	4	F	6'6"	233	(redshirt) Sophomore	Fresno, CA	Transferred to Texas Tech
Nate Calmese	8	G	6'2"	164	Junior	Gilbert, AZ	Transferred to Wake Forest
Isaiah Watts	12	G	6'3"	170	Sophomore	West Seattle, WA	Transferred to Maryland
Dane Erikstrup	32	F	6'11"	226	Senior	Beaverton, OR	Graduated; signed with Donar Groningen
Dimitrije Vukicevic	33	C	7'0"		Freshman	Serbia	Transferred to UC San Diego

=== Incoming transfers ===
Name	Num	Pos.	Height	Weight	Year	Hometown	Previous school
Emmanuel Ugbo	0	F	6'8"	235	Junior	Barendrecht, Netherlands	Boise State
Eemeli Yalaho	2	F	6'8"	240	Junior	Jyväskylä, Finland	Texas Tech
Simon Hildebrandt	3	F	6'9"	238	Senior	Winnipeg, MB	High Point
Jerone Morton	11	G	6'4"	200	Junior	Winchester, KY	Morehead State

=== 2025 recruiting class ===
College recruiting
Name	Hometown	School	Height	Weight	Commit date
Aaron Glass; SG	Rancho Cucamonga, CA	Rancho Cucamonga High School	6 ft 0 in (1.83 m)	170 lb (77 kg)	May 15, 2025
Aaron Glass; SG	Recruit ratings: Rivals: 247Sports: ESPN: (79)				
Brunel Madzou; CG	Finland	Drive Academy	6 ft 0 in (1.83 m)	175 lb (79 kg)	Jun 1, 2025
Brunel Madzou; CG	Recruit ratings: Rivals: 247Sports: ESPN: (0)				
Dominik Robinson; SG	Portland, OR	Rosemary Anderson Prep	6 ft 10 in (2.08 m)	225 lb (102 kg)	May 26, 2025
Dominik Robinson; SG	Recruit ratings: Rivals: 247Sports: ESPN: (0)				
Adria Rodriguez; SG	Spain	N/A	6 ft 4 in (1.93 m)	185 lb (84 kg)	Jul 3, 2025
Adria Rodriguez; SG	Recruit ratings: Rivals: 247Sports: ESPN: (0)				
Overall recruit ranking:
Note: In many cases, Scout, Rivals, 247Sports, On3, and ESPN may conflict in their listings of height and weight.; In these cases, the average was taken. ESPN grades are on a 100-point scale.; Sources: "2025 Washington State Commits". Rivals.; "Men's Basketball Recruiting". Scout.; "ESPN- Washington State Cougars Men's Basketball Recruiting". ESPN.; "Scout.com Team Recruiting Rankings". Scout.; "2025 Team Ranking". Rivals.

=== 2026 recruiting class ===
College recruiting (2026)
Name	Hometown	School	Height	Weight	Commit date
Brayden Kyman; PF	Santa Margarita, CA	Santa Margarita Catholic High School	6 ft 7 in (2.01 m)	195 lb (88 kg)	Sep 24, 2024
Brayden Kyman; PF	Recruit ratings: Rivals: 247Sports: ESPN: (78)				
Overall recruit ranking:
Note: In many cases, Scout, Rivals, 247Sports, On3, and ESPN may conflict in their listings of height and weight.; In these cases, the average was taken. ESPN grades are on a 100-point scale.; Sources: "2024 Washington State Commits". Rivals.; "Men's Basketball Recruiting". Scout.; "ESPN- Washington State Cougars Men's Basketball Recruiting". ESPN.; "Scout.com Team Recruiting Rankings". Scout.; "2024 Team Ranking". Rivals.

== Roster ==
2025–26 Washington State Cougars men's basketball team
Players
Coaches

Pos.	#	Name	Height	Weight	Year	Previous school	Hometown
F	0	Emmanuel Ugbo	6 ft 8 in (2.03 m)	245 lb (111 kg)	Jr	Boise State	Barendrecht, Netherlands
F	2	Eemeli Yalaho	6 ft 8 in (2.03 m)	235 lb (107 kg)	Jr	Texas Tech	Jyväskylä, Finland
F	3	Simon Hildebrandt	6 ft 9 in (2.06 m)	240 lb (109 kg)	Sr	High Point	Winnipeg, MB
G	4	Brunel Madzou	6 ft 0 in (1.83 m)	—	Fr	Finland Drive Academy	Tampere, Finland
G	5	Tómas Valur Þrastarson	6 ft 7 in (2.01 m)	215 lb (98 kg)	So	Þór Þorlákshöfn (ISL)	Þorlákshöfn, Iceland
G	7	Dio Blakely	6 ft 0 in (1.83 m)	160 lb (73 kg)	Fr	SoCal Academy	Los Angeles, CA
G	10	Parker Gerrits	6 ft 2 in (1.88 m)	190 lb (86 kg)	RS So	Olympia HS	Olympia, WA
G	11	Jerone Morton	6 ft 4 in (1.93 m)	180 lb (82 kg)	Jr	Morehead State	Winchester, KY
G	13	Adrià Rodriguez	6 ft 0 in (1.83 m)	—	Sr	HLA Alicante (FEB)	Sant Just, Catalonia, Spain
F	15	Rihards Vavers	6 ft 7 in (2.01 m)	210 lb (95 kg)	Jr	Quinnpiac	Ādaži, Latvia
G	21	Ace Glass	6 ft 3 in (1.91 m)	185 lb (84 kg)	Fr	Rancho Cucamonga HS	Rialto, CA
F	22	ND Okafor	6 ft 10 in (2.08 m)	250 lb (113 kg)	RS Jr	California	Dundalk, Ireland
F	24	Dominik Robinson	6 ft 10 in (2.08 m)	225 lb (102 kg)	Fr	Rainier Beach HS	Graham, WA
G	51	Kase Wynott	6 ft 6 in (1.98 m)	215 lb (98 kg)	So	Lapwai HS	Winchester, ID

Head coach

- David Riley (Whitworth)

Assistant coach(es)

- Orlando Johnson (Loyola Marymount)
- Donald Brady (Redlands)
- Jerry Brown (Fresno State)
- Pedro Garcia Rosado (Open)
- George Galanopoulos (basketball coach) (Indiana)

Legend

- (C) Team captain
- (S) Suspended
- (I) Ineligible
- (W) Walk-on
- Injured
- Current redshirt

Roster

== Schedule and results ==
Date time, TV	Rank^{#}	Opponent^{#}	Result	Record	High points	High rebounds	High assists	Site (attendance) city, state
Exhibition
October 25, 2025*; 6:00 p.m.		New Mexico	W 74–66		16 – Ugbo	14 – Okafor	5 – Rodriguez	Beasley Coliseum (670); Pullman, WA
Non-conference regular season
November 3, 2025*; 6:30 p.m., ESPN+		Idaho; Battle of the Palouse	L 81–83	0–1	17 – Tied	8 – Ugbo	3 – Rodriguez	Beasley Coliseum (3,588); Pullman, WA
November 7, 2025*; 4:00 p.m., ESPN+		at Davidson	L 69–85	0–2	16 – Ugbo	5 – Tied	2 – Rodriguez	John M. Belk Arena (2,646); Davidson, NC
November 10, 2025*; 6:30 p.m., ESPN+		St. Thomas (MN)	W 81–71	1–2	19 – Thrastarson	7 – Thrastarson	4 – Tied	Beasley Coliseum (2,845); Pullman, WA
November 14, 2025*; 8:00 p.m., ESPN+		Washington; Rivalry	L 69–81	1–3	15 – Yalaho	7 – Ugbo	5 – Rodriguez	Beasley Coliseum (5,320); Pullman, WA
November 19, 2025*; 8:00 p.m., ESPN+		Southern Utah	W 98–74	2–3	27 – Okafor	11 – Yalaho	5 – Tied	Beasley Coliseum (2,532); Pullman, WA
November 24, 2025*; 6:00 p.m., ESPNU		at Chaminade; Southwest Maui Invitational Quarterfinals	W 90–85	3–3	26 – Glass	9 – Yalaho	6 – Rodriguez	Lahaina Civic Center (2,400); Lahaina, HI
November 25, 2025*; 5:00 p.m., ESPN		vs. Arizona State; Southwest Maui Invitational Semifinals	L 94–100	3–4	40 – Glass	6 – Okafor	2 – Tied	Lahaina Civic Center (2,400); Lahaina, HI
November 26, 2025*; 2:30 p.m., ESPN2		vs. Seton Hall; Southwest Maui Invitational Third Place Game	L 61–75	3–5	17 – Vavers	6 – Vavers	3 – Tied	Lahaina Civic Center (2,400); Lahaina, HI
December 2, 2025*; 5:00 p.m., ESPN+		at Bradley	L 60–64	3–6	15 – Glass	11 – Yalaho	2 – Tied	Carver Arena (4,919); Peoria, IL
December 7, 2025*; 2:00 p.m., ESPN+		Nevada	L 64–78	3–7	20 – Thrastarson	8 – Okafor	3 – Morton	Beasley Coliseum (2,548); Pullman, WA
December 14, 2025*; 4:30 p.m., FS1		at USC	L 61–68	3–8	13 – Vavers	6 – Tied	3 – Thrastarson	Galen Center (5,394); Los Angeles, CA
December 17, 2025*; 7:00 p.m., SWX		vs. Eastern Washington; 509 Classic	W 78–63	4–8	20 – Ugbo	7 – Yalaho	6 – Morton	Numerica Veterans Arena (3,749); Spokane, WA
December 20, 2025*; 2:00 p.m., ESPN+		Mercer	W 84–78	5–8	24 – Glass	9 – Yalaho	4 – Morton	Beasley Coliseum (2,374); Pullman, WA
WCC regular season
December 28, 2025; 2:00 p.m., ESPN+		at Portland	W 67–62	6–8 (1–0)	13 – Vavers	9 – Yalaho	4 – Yalaho	Chiles Center (1,448); Portland, OR
December 30, 2025; 7:00 p.m., ESPN+		at Seattle	L 55–69	6–9 (1–1)	13 – Glass	12 – Okafor	2 – Ugbo	Climate Pledge Arena (4,386); Seattle, WA
January 2, 2026; 6:30 p.m., ESPN+		LMU	W 78–76	7–9 (2–1)	17 – Vavers	9 – Okafor	5 – Glass	Beasley Coliseum (2,580); Pullman, WA
January 4, 2026; 4:30 p.m., ESPN+		Oregon State	W 81–67	8–9 (3–1)	16 – Glass	7 – Rodriguez	3 – Tied	Numerica Veterans Arena (3,369); Spokane, WA
January 10, 2026; 2:00 p.m., CBSSN		at Saint Mary's	L 82–88	8–10 (3–2)	24 – Glass	7 – Okafor	9 – Morton	University Credit Union Pavilion (3,500); Moraga, CA
January 15, 2026; 7:00 p.m., CBSSN		No. 9 Gonzaga; Rivalry	L 65–86	8–11 (3–3)	16 – Tied	8 – Rodriguez	3 – Yalaho	Beasley Coliseum (6,439); Pullman, WA
January 18, 2026; 4:00 p.m., ESPN+		at San Francisco	L 80–85	8–12 (3–4)	21 – Yalaho	5 – Tied	6 – Rodriguez	Sobrato Center (2,182); San Francisco, CA
January 21, 2026; 6:30 p.m., ESPN+		at San Diego	L 92–96	8–13 (3–5)	29 – Glass	7 – Tied	5 – Rodriguez	Jenny Craig Pavilion (855); San Diego, CA
January 24, 2026; 3:00 p.m., ESPN+		Pepperdine	W 95–79	9–13 (4–5)	19 – Hildebrandt	8 – Ugbo	5 – Glass	Beasley Coliseum (2,773); Pullman, WA
January 28, 2026; 6:30 p.m., ESPN+		Seattle	W 70–58	10–13 (5–5)	24 – Vavers	9 – Yalaho	5 – Rodriguez	Beasley Coliseum (3,061); Pullman, WA
January 31, 2026; 3:00 p.m., ESPN+		Portland	W 104–74	11–13 (6–5)	26 – Yalaho	9 – Yalaho	9 – Rodriguez	Beasley Coliseum (2,857); Pullman, WA
February 4, 2026; 8:00 p.m., CBSSN		at Oregon State	L 64–74	11–14 (6–6)	17 – Glass	6 – Tied	4 – Rodriguez	Gill Coliseum (3,626); Corvallis, OR
February 7, 2026; 3:00 p.m., ESPN+		Santa Clara	L 92–96	11–15 (6–7)	21 – Yalaho	8 – Okafor	4 – Tied	Beasley Coliseum (2,965); Pullman, WA
February 10, 2026; 8:00 p.m., ESPN2		at No. 12 Gonzaga; Rivalry	L 53–83	11–16 (6–8)	15 – Morton	6 – Vavers	4 – Morton	McCarthey Athletic Center (6,000); Spokane, WA
February 18, 2026; 6:30 p.m., ESPN+		Pacific	W 87–70	12–16 (7–8)	21 – Vavers	8 – Yalaho	5 – Rodriguez	Beasley Coliseum (2,494); Pullman, WA
February 21, 2026; 7:00 p.m., ESPN2		Saint Mary's	L 67–83	12–17 (7–9)	15 – Tied	6 – Vavers	6 – Rodriguez	Beasley Coliseum (4,230); Pullman, WA
February 25, 2026; 8:00 p.m., ESPNU		at LMU	L 66–67	12–18 (7–10)	20 – Glass	9 – Yalaho	6 – Rodriguez	Gersten Pavilion (994); Los Angeles, CA
February 28, 2026; 5:00 p.m., ESPN+		at Pepperdine	L 79–88	12–19 (7–11)	22 – Glass	10 – Okafor	4 – Tied	Firestone Fieldhouse (792); Malibu, CA
WCC Tournament
March 6, 2026; 6:00 p.m., ESPN+	(8)	vs. (9) Portland; Second Round	L 68–74	12–20	19 – Glass	6 – Tied	5 – Tied	Orleans Arena (1,890); Las Vegas, NV
*Non-conference game. ^{#}Rankings from AP Poll. (#) Tournament seedings in parentheses. All times are in Pacific Time.

== Game summaries ==
=== Exhibition: New Mexico ===
Series History: New Mexico leads 3-2
Starting Lineups:

- New Mexico: #1 Deyton Albury, #5 Antonio Chol, #8 Chris Howell, #10 Tomislav Buljan, #23 Jake Hall
- Washington State: #2 Eemeli Yalaho, #5 Tomas Thrastarson, #11 Jerone Morton, #13 Adria Rodriguez, #22 ND Okafor

Oct. 25
6 p.m. PDT

Recap

New Mexico Lobos 66, Washington State Cougars 74
Scoring by half: 38-37, 28-37
Pts: Antonio Chol, Uriah Tenette 11; Rebs: Tomislav Buljan 9 Asts: Chris Howell 4	Pts: Emmanuel Ugbo 16; Rebs: ND Okafor 14; Asts: Adria Rodriguez 5

Beasley Coliseum
Pullman, WA
Attendance: 670
Referees: Toby Doolittle, Justin Shamion, Tony Padilla

=== Idaho ===
Broadcasters: Trevor Williams and Matt Muehlebach

Series history: Washington State leads 169-110
Starting lineups:

- Idaho: #0 Brody Rowbury, #3 Biko Johnson, #7 Jack Payne, #12 Jackson Rasmussen, #14 Kolton Mitchell
- Washington State: #2 Eemeli Yalaho, #5 Tomas Thrastarson, #11 Jerone Morton, #13 Adria Rodriguez, #22 ND Okafor

ESPN+

Nov. 3
6:30 p.m. PST

Recap

Idaho Vandals 83, Washington State Cougars 81
Scoring by half: 43-34, 40-47
Pts: Kristian Gonzalez 18; Rebs: Jack Payne 7 Asts: Kolton Mitchell 4	Pts: Tomas Thrastarson, Emmanuel Ugbo, Ace Glass 17; Rebs: Emmanuel Ugbo 8 Asts: Adria Rodriguez 3

Beasley Coliseum
Pullman, WA
Attendance: 3,588
Referees: Mark Cook, Toby Doolittle, DG Nelson

=== at Davidson ===
Broadcasters: Nick Klos, Greg Herenda and Katelyn McCarthy

Series history: First meeting
Starting lineups:

- Washington State: #0 Emmanuel Ugbo, #5 Tomas Thrastarson, #11 Jerone Morton, #13 Adria Rodriguez, #22 ND Okafor
- Davidson: #0 Manie Joses, #4 Josh Scovens, #5 Parker Friedrichsen, #11 Sam Brown, #15 Sean Logan

ESPN+

Nov. 7
4 p.m. PST

Recap

Washington State Cougars 69, Davidson Wildcats 85
Scoring by half: 24-40, 45-45
Pts: Emmanuel Ugbo 16; Rebs: Emmanuel Ugbo, ND Okafor 5 Asts: Adria Rodriguez 2	Pts: Hunter Adam 14; Rebs: Parker Friedrichsen 5 Asts: Sam Brown, Devin Brown 4

John M. Belk Arena
Davidson, NC
Attendance: 2,646
Referees: Darron George, Leslie Jones, Eric Curry

=== St. Thomas (MN) ===
Broadcasters: Trevor Williams and Stephen Madison

Series history: First meeting
Starting lineups:

- St. Thomas (MN): #4 Nolan Minessale, #12 Ryan Dufault, #23 Nick Janowski, #32 Carter Bjerke, #34 Ben Oosterbaan
- Washington State: #0 Emmanuel Ugbo, #5 Tomas Thrastarson, #11 Jerone Morton, #13 Adria Rodriguez, #22 ND Okafor

ESPN+

Nov. 10
6:30 p.m. PST

Recap

St. Thomas (Minnesota) Tommies 71, Washington State Cougars 83
Scoring by half: 30-50, 41-31
Pts: Nick Janowski 22; Rebs: Isaiah Johnson-Arigu 4 Asts: Nolan Minessale 6	Pts: Tomas Thrastarson 19; Rebs: Tomas Thrastarson 7 Asts: Jerone Morton 4

Beasley Coliseum
Pullman, WA
Attendance: 2,845
Referees: Chance Moore, Eric Curry, Deron White

=== Washington ===
Broadcasters: Ted Robinson and Don MacLean

Series history: Washington leads 186-111
Starting lineups:

- Washington: #5 Zoom Diallo, #6 Hannes Steinbach, #9 Wesley Yates III, #11 Franck Kepnang, #23 JJ Mandaquit
- Washington State: #0 Emmanuel Ugbo, #5 Tomas Thrastarson, #11 Jerone Morton, #13 Adria Rodriguez, #22 ND Okafor

ESPN+

Nov. 14
8 p.m. PST

Recap

Washington Huskies 81, Washington State Cougars 69
Scoring by half: 44-30, 37-39
Pts: Wesley Yates III 26; Rebs: Hannes Steinbach 13; Asts: Zoom Diallo 4	Pts: Eemeli Yalaho 15; Rebs: Emmanuel Ugbo 7 Asts: Adria Rodriguez 5

Beasley Coliseum
Pullman, WA
Attendance: 5,320
Referees: Robert Felder, Michael Reed, Tony Padilla

=== Southern Utah ===
Broadcasters: Ann Schatz and Mary Murphy

Series history: Washington State leads 2-1
Starting lineups:

- Southern Utah: #0 Isaiah Cottrell, #1 Elijah Duval, #3 Tanner Hayhurst, #24 Cale Barclay, #35 Jaiden Feroah
- Washington State: #0 Emmanuel Ugbo, #5 Simon Hildebrandt, #11 Jerone Morton, #13 Adria Rodriguez, #22 ND Okafor

ESPN+

Nov. 19
8 p.m. PST

Recap

Southern Utah Thunderbirds 74, Washington State Cougars 98
Scoring by half: 40-54, 34-44
Pts: Dylan Jones 24; Rebs: Jaiden Feroah, Isaiah Cottrell, Dylan Jones, Kai Burdick 4 Asts: Tanner Hayhurst, Elijah Duval 3	Pts: ND Okafor 27; Rebs: Eemeli Yalaho 11; Asts: Jerone Morton, Adria Rodriguez 5

Beasley Coliseum
Pullman, WA
Attendance: 2,532
Referees: Ray Ames, Keith Patterson, Gregory Nixon

=== at Chaminade ===
Broadcasters: Kanoa Leahey and Sean Farnham

Series history: First meeting
Starting lineups:

- Washington State: #3 Simon Hildebrandt, #5 Tomas Thrastarson, #11 Jerone Morton, #13 Adria Rodriguez, #22 ND Okafor
- Chaminade: #1 Nathan Medina, #3 Kent King, #10 Roland Banks II, #12 Kris King, #25 Fletcher MacDonald

ESPNU

Nov. 24
6 p.m. PST

Recap

Washington State Cougars 90, Chaminade Silverswords 85
Scoring by half: 41-52, 49-33
Pts: Ace Glass 26; Rebs: Eemeli Yalaho 9 Asts: Adria Rodriguez 6	Pts: Kent King 20; Rebs: Kent King 10; Asts: Kent King 5

Lahaina Civic Center
Lahaina, HI
Attendance: 2,400
Referees: Rob Rorke, Mike Palau, Lamar Simpson

=== vs. Arizona State ===
Broadcasters: Kanoa Leahey and Sean Farnham

Series history: Arizona State leads 48-42
Starting lineups:

- Washington State: #2 Eemeli Yalaho, #5 Tomas Thrastarson, #11 Jerone Morton, #21 Ace Glass, #22 ND Okafor
- Arizona State: #1 Santiago Trouet, #4 Bryce Ford, #5 Maurice Odum, #14 Andrija Grbović, #35 Massamba Diop

ESPN

Nov. 25
5 p.m. PST

Recap

Washington State Cougars 94, Arizona State Sun Devils 100
Scoring by half: 48-42, 46-58
Pts: Ace Glass 40; Rebs: ND Okafor 6 Asts: Ace Glass, Jerone Morton, Simon Hildebrandt 2	Pts: Maurice Odum 26; Rebs: Massamba Diop 5 Asts: Maurice Odum 5

Lahaina Civic Center
Lahaina, HI
Attendance: 2,400
Referees: Chris Pacsi, Bill Covington, Jeff Anderson

=== vs. Seton Hall ===
Broadcasters: Dan Shulman and Jay Bilas

Series history: Washington State leads 1-0
Starting lineups:

- Seton Hall: #0 Adam Clark, #6 Stephon Payne III, #14 A.J. Staton-McCray, #22 Elijah Fisher, #23 Mike Williams III
- Washington State: #2 Eemeli Yalaho, #5 Tomas Thrastarson, #11 Jerone Morton, #21 Ace Glass, #22 ND Okafor

ESPN2

Nov. 26
2:30 p.m. PST

Recap

Seton Hall Pirates 75, Washington State Cougars 61
Scoring by half: 37-27, 38-34
Pts: A.J. Staton-McCray 20; Rebs: Stephon Payne III 7 Asts: Adam Clark 7	Pts: Rihards Vavers 17; Rebs: Rihards Vavers 6 Asts: Ace Glass, Adria Rodriguez 3

Lahaina Civic Center
Lahaina, HI
Attendance: 2,400
Referees: Mike Palau, Bill Covington, Michael Greenstein

=== at Bradley ===
Broadcasters: Brian Bedo and Kristof Kendrick

Series history: Washington State leads 3-1
Starting lineups:

- Washington State: #2 Eemeli Yalaho, #5 Tomas Thrastarson, #11 Jerone Morton, #21 Ace Glass, #22 ND Okafor
- Bradley: #0 Demarion Burch, #3 Alex Huibregtse, #14 Ahmet Jonovic, #21 AJ Smith, #22 Jaquan Johnson

ESPN+

Dec. 2
5 p.m. PST

Recap

Washington State Cougars 60, Bradley Braves 64
Scoring by half: 29-28, 31-36
Pts: Ace Glass 15; Rebs: Eemeli Yalaho 11; Asts: Ace Glass, Tomas Thrastarson, Jerone Morton, Emmanuel Ugbo 2	Pts: Demarion Burch 23; Rebs: AJ Smith, Ahmet Jonovic 6 Asts: Jaquan Johnson, Montana Wheeler 3

Carver Arena
Peoria, IL
Attendance: 4,919
Referees: Randy Heimerman, Tyler Kumpf, Chance Moore

=== Nevada ===
Broadcasters: Trevor Williams and Dan Dickau

Series history: Washington State leads 4-1
Starting lineups:

- Nevada: #0 Chuck Bailey III, #1 Elijah Price, #6 Kaleb Lowery, #7 Vaughn Weems, #12 Tayshawn Comer
- Washington State: #2 Eemeli Yalaho, #11 Jerone Morton, #15 Rihards Vavers, #21 Ace Glass, #22 ND Okafor

ESPN+

Dec. 7
2 p.m. PST

Recap

Nevada Wolf Pack 78, Washington State Cougars 64
Scoring by half: 31-32, 47-32
Pts: Tayshawn Comer 24; Rebs: Elijah Price 8 Asts: Tayshawn Comer, Myles Walker 2	Pts: Tomas Thrastarson 20; Rebs: ND Okafor 8 Asts: Jerone Morton 3

Beasley Coliseum
Pullman, WA
Attendance: 2,548
Referees: Michael Mojica, Randy McCall, Tony Padilla

=== at USC ===
Broadcasters: Dan Hellie and Miles Simon

Series history: USC leads 82-51
Starting lineups:

- Washington State: #2 Eemeli Yalaho, #5 Tomas Thrastarson, #11 Jerone Morton, #15 Rihards Vavers, #22 ND Okafor
- USC: #2 Ezra Ausar, #4 Chad Baker-Mazara, #6 Jacob Cofie, #8 Jerry Easter II, #9 Ryan Cornish

FS1

Dec. 14
4:30 p.m. PST

Recap

Washington State Cougars 61, USC Trojans 68
Scoring by half: 26-33, 35-35
Pts: Rihards Vavers 13; Rebs: Eemeli Yalaho, Emmanuel Ugbo 6 Asts: Tomas Thrastarson 3	Pts: Jacob Cofie 21; Rebs: Jacob Cofie 10; Asts: Chad Baker-Mazara, Jordan Marsh 5

Galen Center
Los Angeles, CA
Attendance: 5,394
Referees: Mike Littlewood, Paul Szelc, Keith Kimble

=== vs. Eastern Washington ===
Broadcasters: Austin Getz and Stephen Madison

Series history: Washington State leads 59-13
Starting lineups:

- Washington State: #2 Eemeli Yalaho, #5 Tomas Thrastarson, #11 Jerone Morton, #15 Rihards Vavers, #22 ND Okafor
- Eastern Washington: #2 Isaiah Moses, #12 Straton Rogers, #15 Kiree Huie, #22 Jojo Anderson, #33 Emmett Marquardt

SWX

Dec. 17
7 p.m. PST

Recap

Washington State Cougars 78, Eastern Washington Eagles 63
Scoring by half: 45-31, 33-32
Pts: Emmanuel Ugbo 20; Rebs: Eemeli Yalaho 7 Asts: Jerone Morton 6	Pts: Alton Hamilton IV 16; Rebs: Alton Hamilton IV 5 Asts: Isaiah Moses 5

Numerica Veterans Arena
Spokane, WA
Attendance: 3,749
Referees: Kirk Smith, Deron White, Eric Curry

=== Mercer ===
Broadcasters: Barry Tompkins and Dan Belluomini

Series history: First meeting
Starting lineups:

- Mercer: #1 Zaire Williams, #2 Connor Serven, #6 Baraka Okojie, #11 Brady Shoulders, #26 Armani Mighty
- Washington State: #2 Eemeli Yalaho, #5 Tomas Thrastarson, #13 Adria Rodriguez, #21 Ace Glass, #22 ND Okafor

ESPN+

Dec. 20
2 p.m. PST

Recap

Mercer Bears 78, Washington State Cougars 84
Scoring by half: 39-41, 39-43
Pts: Baraka Okojie 24; Rebs: Armani Mighty 11; Asts: Brady Shoulders 5	Pts: Ace Glass 24; Rebs: Eemeli Yalaho 10; Asts: Jerone Morton 4

Beasley Coliseum
Pullman, WA
Attendance: 2,374
Referees: Ryan Holmes, Michael Greenstein, Greg Nixon

=== at Portland ===
Broadcasters: Bryan Sleik and Jennifer Mountain

Series history: Washington State leads 14-2
Starting lineups:

- Washington State: #2 Eemeli Yalaho, #5 Tomas Thrastarson, #13 Adria Rodriguez, #21 Ace Glass, #22 ND Okafor
- Portland: #7 Matus Hronsky, #14 James O'Donnell, #23 Joel Foxwell, #35 Cameron Williams, #44 Mikah Ballew

ESPN+

Dec. 28
2 p.m. PST

Recap

Washington State Cougars 67, Portland Pilots 62
Scoring by half: 32-23, 35-39
Pts: Rihards Vavers 13; Rebs: Eemeli Yalaho 9 Asts: Eemeli Yalaho 4	Pts: Joel Foxwell, Mikah Ballew 15; Rebs: Jermaine Ballisager Webb 8 Asts: Joel Foxwell 6

Chiles Center
Portland, OR
Attendance: 1,448
Referees: DG Nelson, Tyler Kumpf, Bret Smith

=== at Seattle ===
Broadcasters: Adam Race and John Impelman

Series history: Tied 9-9
Starting lineups:

- Washington State: #2 Eemeli Yalaho, #5 Tomas Thrastarson, #13 Adria Rodriguez, #21 Ace Glass, #22 ND Okafor
- Seattle: #0 Brayden Maldonado, #1 Maleek Arington, #15 Will Heimbrodt, #21 Jun Seok Yeo, #34 Austin Maurer

ESPN+

Dec. 30
7 p.m. PST

Recap

Washington State Cougars 55, Seattle Redhawks 69
Scoring by half: 22-36, 33-33
Pts: Ace Glass 13; Rebs: ND Okafor 12; Asts: Emmanuel Ugbo 2	Pts: Brayden Maldonado 15; Rebs: Austin Maurer 6 Asts: Will Heimbrodt, Maleek Arington, Austin Maurer 3

Climate Pledge Arena
Seattle, WA
Attendance: 4,386
Referees: Shawn Lehigh, Michael Greenstein, Randy McCall

=== LMU ===
Broadcasters: Trevor Williams and Stephen Madison

Series history: Washington State leads 4-2
Starting lineups:

- LMU: #1 Jalen Shelley, #2 Rodney Brown Jr., #5 Myron Amey Jr., #7 Jan Vide, #35 Rokas Jocius
- Washington State: #0 Emmanuel Ugbo, #2 Eemeli Yalaho, #11 Jerone Morton, #21 Ace Glass, #22 ND Okafor

ESPN+

Jan. 2
6:30 p.m. PST

Recap

LMU Lions 76, Washington State Cougars 78
Scoring by half: 32-34, 44-44
Pts: Jan Vide 28; Rebs: Jalen Shelley 9 Asts: Jalen Shelley 4	Pts: Rihards Vavers 17; Rebs: ND Okafor 9 Asts: Ace Glass 5

Beasley Coliseum
Pullman, WA
Attendance: 2,580
Referees: Toby Doolittle, Alexander Thompson, Mark Fulton

=== vs. Oregon State ===
Broadcasters: Trevor Williams and Matt Muehlebach

Series history: Oregon State leads 175-132
Starting lineups:

- Oregon State: #0 Dez White, #2 Josiah Lake II, #7 Keziah Ekissi, #13 Isaiah Sy, #24 Johan Munch
- Washington State: #2 Eemeli Yalaho, #11 Jerone Morton, #15 Rihards Vavers, #21 Ace Glass, #22 ND Okafor

ESPN+

Jan. 4
4:30 p.m. PST

Recap

Oregon State Beavers 67, Washington State Cougars 81
Scoring by half: 33-47, 34-34
Pts: Dez White 16; Rebs: Olavi Suutela 5 Asts: Josiah Lake II 5	Pts: Ace Glass 16; Rebs: Adria Rodriguez 7 Asts: Ace Glass, Jerone Morton, Eemeli Yalaho 3

Numerica Veterans Arena
Spokane, WA
Attendance: 3,369
Referees: Jimmy Casas, Layne Barney, Justin Shamion

=== at Saint Mary's ===
Broadcasters: Rich Waltz and Dan Dickau

Series history: Saint Mary's leads 3-1
Starting lineups:

- Washington State: #2 Eemeli Yalaho, #11 Jerone Morton, #15 Rihards Vavers, #21 Ace Glass, #22 ND Okafor
- Saint Mary's: #0 Mikey Lewis, #1 Harry Wessels, #7 Joshua Dent, #11 Dillan Shaw, #23 Paulius Murauskas

CBSSN

Jan. 10
2 p.m. PST

Recap

Washington State Cougars 82, Saint Mary's Gaels 88
Scoring by half: 38-50, 44-38
Pts: Ace Glass 24; Rebs: ND Okafor 7 Asts: Jerone Morton 9	Pts: Joshua Dent 26; Rebs: Andrew McKeever 11; Asts: Paulius Murauskas, Dillan Shaw 6

University Credit Union Pavilion
Moraga, CA
Attendance: 3,500
Referees: Frank Harvey III, Jason Garretson, DG Nelson

=== No. 9 Gonzaga ===
Broadcasters: Rich Waltz, Dan Dickau and Hailey Sutton

Series history: Washington State leads 98-54
Starting lineups:

- Gonzaga: #3 Braeden Smith, #5 Emmanuel Innocenti, #8 Jalen Warley, #15 Graham Ike, #23 Adam Miller
- Washington State: #0 Emmanuel Ugbo, #2 Eemeli Yalaho, #11 Jerone Morton, #21 Ace Glass, #22 ND Okafor

CBSSN

Jan. 15
7 p.m. PST

Recap

Gonzaga Bulldogs 86, Washington State Cougars 65
Scoring by half: 43-33, 43-32
Pts: Graham Ike 23; Rebs: Graham Ike 11; Asts: Graham Ike 5	Pts: Ace Glass, Jerone Morton, Simon Hildebrandt 16; Rebs: Adria Rodriguez 8 Asts: Eemeli Yalaho 3

Beasley Coliseum
Pullman, WA
Attendance: 6,439
Referees: Michael Reed, Marques Pettigrew, Randy McCall

=== at San Francisco ===
Broadcasters: Barry Tompkins and Dan Belluomini

Series history: Washington State leads 3-2
Starting lineups:

- Washington State: #2 Eemeli Yalaho, #11 Jerone Morton, #13 Adria Rodriguez, #21 Ace Glass, #22 ND Okafor
- San Francisco: #0 Ryan Beasley, #5 Tyrone Riley IV, #8 David Fuchs, #13 Legend Smiley, #35 Barry Wang

ESPN+

Jan. 18
4 p.m. PST

Recap

Washington State Cougars 80, San Francisco Dons 85
Scoring by half: 44-48, 36-37
Pts: Eemeli Yalaho 21; Rebs: Eemeli Yalaho, ND Okafor 5 Asts: Adria Rodriguez 6	Pts: Barry Wang 15; Rebs: Tyrone Riley IV 6 Asts: Ryan Beasley, Vukasin Masic 6

War Memorial Gymnasium
San Francisco, CA
Attendance: 2,182
Referees: Michael Mojica, Jeffrey Anderson, Tony Padilla

=== at San Diego ===
Broadcasters: Jack Cronin and Braden Surprenant

Series history: Washington State leads 4-2
Starting lineups:

- Washington State: #2 Eemeli Yalaho, #11 Jerone Morton, #13 Adria Rodriguez, #21 Ace Glass, #22 ND Okafor
- San Diego: #2 Adrian McIntyre, #5 Ty-Laur Johnson, #7 Assane Diop, #14 Dominique Ford, #30 Tim Moore Jr.

ESPN+

Jan. 21
6:30 p.m. PST

Recap

Washington State Cougars 92, San Diego Toreros 96
Scoring by half: 32-42, 60-54
Pts: Ace Glass 29; Rebs: Ace Glass, Rihards Vavers 7 Asts: Adria Rodriguez 5	Pts: Ty-Laur Johnson 28; Rebs: Assane Diop 7 Asts: Ty-Laur Johnson 7

Jenny Craig Pavilion
San Diego, CA
Attendance: 855
Referees: Layne Barney, Gary Maxwell, John Hampton

=== Pepperdine ===
Broadcasters: Trevor Williams and Stephen Madison

Series history: Washington State leads 6-3
Starting lineups:

- Pepperdine: #0 Styles Phipps, #3 Aaron Clark, #18 Yonatan Levy, #23 Javon Cooley, #35 Danilo Dozic
- Washington State: #2 Eemeli Yalaho, #11 Jerone Morton, #15 Rihards Vavers, #21 Ace Glass, #22 ND Okafor

ESPN+

Jan. 24
3 p.m. PST

Recap

Pepperdine Waves 79, Washington State Cougars 95
Scoring by half: 47-37, 42-48
Pts: Styles Phipps 25; Rebs: Pavle Stosic 5 Asts: Styles Phipps 5	Pts: Simon Hildebrandt 19; Rebs: Emmanuel Ugbo 8 Asts: Ace Glass 5

Beasley Coliseum
Pullman, WA
Attendance: 2,773
Referees: Shawn Lehigh, DG Nelson, Toby Doolittle

=== Seattle ===
Broadcasters: Trevor Williams and P. J. Carlesimo

Series history: Seattle leads 10-9
Starting lineups:

- Seattle: #0 Brayden Maldonado, #1 Maleek Arington, #15 Will Heimbrodt, #21 Jun Seok Yeo, #34 Austin Maurer
- Washington State: #2 Eemeli Yalaho, #11 Jerone Morton, #15 Rihards Vavers, #21 Ace Glass, #22 ND Okafor

ESPN+

Jan. 28
6:30 p.m. PST

Recap

Seattle Redhawks 58, Washington State Cougars 70
Scoring by half: 30-36, 28-34
Pts: Brayden Maldonado 12; Rebs: Will Heimbrodt 7 Asts: Brayden Maldonado 3	Pts: Rihards Vavers 24; Rebs: Eemeli Yalaho 9 Asts: Adria Rodriguez 5

Beasley Coliseum
Pullman, WA
Attendance: 3,061
Referees: Gregory Nixon, Darron George, Jason Garretson

=== Portland ===
Broadcasters: Trevor Williams and Ernie Kent

Series history: Washington State leads 15-2
Starting lineups:

- Portland: #1 Jermaine Ballisager Webb, #5 Dante Censori-Hercules, #23 Joel Foxwell, #35 Cameron Williams, #44 Mikah Ballew
- Washington State: #2 Eemeli Yalaho, #11 Jerone Morton, #15 Rihards Vavers, #21 Ace Glass, #22 ND Okafor

ESPN+

Jan. 31
3 p.m. PST

Recap

Portland Pilots 74, Washington State Cougars 104
Scoring by half: 31-53, 43-51
Pts: Joel Foxwell 21; Rebs: Dante Censori-Hercules 9 Asts: Cameron Williams, Joel Foxwell 2	Pts: Eemeli Yalaho 26; Rebs: Eemeli Yalaho 9 Asts: Adria Rodriguez 9

Beasley Coliseum
Pullman, WA
Attendance: 2,857
Referees: Matthew Rukasin, Ray Ames, Alexander Thompson

=== at Oregon State ===
Broadcasters: Jack Gordon and Noah Buono

Series history: Oregon State leads 175-133
Starting lineups:

- Washington State: #2 Eemeli Yalaho, #11 Jerone Morton, #15 Rihards Vavers, #21 Ace Glass, #22 ND Okafor
- Oregon State: #0 Dez White, #2 Josiah Lake II, #13 Isaiah Sy, #24 Johan Munch, #37 Olavi Suutela

CBSSN

Feb. 4
8 p.m. PST

Recap

Washington State Cougars 64, Oregon State Beavers 74
Scoring by half: 34-23, 30-51
Pts: Ace Glass 17; Rebs: ND Okafor, Eemeli Yalaho 6 Asts: Adria Rodriguez 4	Pts: Josiah Lake II 22; Rebs: Johan Munch 15; Asts: Keziah Ekissi 4

Gill Coliseum
Corvallis, OR
Attendance: 3,626
Referees: Eric Curry, Christopher Merlo, Jimmy Casas

=== Santa Clara ===
Broadcasters: Trevor Williams and Stephanie Freeman

Series history: Tied 6-6
Starting lineups:

- Santa Clara: Brenton Knapper, Christian Hammond, Elijah Mahi, Bukky Oboye, Jake Ensminger
- Washington State: Eemeli Yalaho, Jerone Morton, Rihards Vavers, Ace Glass, ND Okafor

ESPN+

Feb. 7
3 p.m. PST

Recap

Santa Clara Broncos 96, Washington State Cougars 92
Scoring by half: 49-49, 47-43
Pts: Allen Graves 30; Rebs: Allen Graves 13; Asts: Allen Graves 4	Pts: Eemeli Yalaho 21; Rebs: ND Okafor 8 Asts: Eemeli Yalaho, Jerone Morton, Adria Rodriguez 4

Beasley Coliseum
Pullman, WA
Attendance: 2,965
Referees: Keith Patterson, Toby Doolittle, Matt Rafferty

=== at Gonzaga ===
Broadcasters: Roxy Bernstein and Corey Williams

Series history: Washington State leads 98-55
Starting lineups:

- Washington State: Eemeli Yalaho, Jerone Morton, Rihards Vavers, Ace Glass, ND Okafor
- Gonzaga: Braeden Smith, Emmanuel Innocenti, Jalen Warley, Graham Ike, Adam Miller

ESPN2

Feb. 10
8 p.m. PST

Recap

Washington State Cougars 53, Gonzaga Bulldogs 83
Scoring by half: 21-48, 32-35
Pts: Jerone Morton 15; Rebs: Rihards Vavers 6 Asts: Jerone Morton 4	Pts: Graham Ike 20; Rebs: Graham Ike 7 Asts: Braeden Smith 4

McCarthey Athletic Center
Spokane, WA
Attendance: 6,000
Referees: Deldre Carr, Chance Moore, Marques Pettigrew

=== Pacific ===
Broadcasters: Trevor Williams and P. J. Carlesimo

Series history: Pacific leads 2-0
Starting lineups:

- Pacific: Justin Rochelin, Elias Ralph, Jaden Clayton, TJ Wainwright, Isaac Jack
- Washington State: Eemeli Yalaho, Jerone Morton, Rihards Vavers, Ace Glass, ND Okafor

ESPN+

Feb. 18
6:30 p.m. PST

Recap

Pacific Tigers 70, Washington State Cougars 87
Scoring by half: 40-51, 30-36
Pts: Elias Ralph 16; Rebs: Jaion Pitt 6 Asts: Jaden Clayton, TJ Wainwright 4	Pts: Rihards Vavers 21; Rebs: Eemeli Yalaho 8 Asts: Adria Rodriguez 5

Beasley Coliseum
Pullman, WA
Attendance: 2,494
Referees: Randy McCall, Keith Patterson, Jimmy Casas

=== Saint Mary's ===
Broadcasters: Dave Feldman and Corey Williams

Series history: Saint Mary's leads 4-1
Starting lineups:

- Saint Mary's: Mikey Lewis, Harry Wessels, Joshua Dent, Dillan Shaw, Paulius Murauskas
- Washington State: Eemeli Yalaho, Jerone Morton, Rihards Vavers, Ace Glass, ND Okafor

ESPN2

Feb. 21
7 p.m. PST

Recap

Saint Mary's Gaels 83, Washington State Cougars 67
Scoring by half: 40-39, 43-28
Pts: Joshua Dent 22; Rebs: Paulius Murauskas 12; Asts: Paulius Murauskas 4	Pts: Ace Glass, ND Okafor 15; Rebs: Rihards Vavers 6 Asts: Adria Rodriguez 6

Beasley Coliseum
Pullman, WA
Attendance: 4,230
Referees: Lewis Garrison, Matt Rafferty, Christopher Merlo

=== at LMU ===
Broadcasters: Chris Sylvester and Jerod Haase

Series history: Washington State leads 5-2
Starting lineups:

- Washington State: Eemeli Yalaho, Jerone Morton, Rihards Vavers, Ace Glass, ND Okafor
- LMU: Rodney Brown Jr., Myron Amey Jr., Jan Vide, Aaron McBride, Rokas Jocius

ESPNU

Feb. 25
8 p.m. PST

Recap

Washington State Cougars 66, LMU Lions 67
Scoring by half: 39-24, 27-43
Pts: Ace Glass 20; Rebs: Eemeli Yalaho 9 Asts: Adria Rodriguez 6	Pts: Myron Amey Jr. 31; Rebs: Aaron McBride 8 Asts: Jan Vide 7

Gersten Pavilion
Los Angeles, CA
Attendance: 994
Referees: Glen Mayberry, Tyler Kumpf, Darron George

=== at Pepperdine ===
Broadcasters: Al Epstein and Joey Vergilis

Series history: Washington State leads 7-3
Starting lineups:

- Washington State: Eemeli Yalaho, Jerone Morton, Rihards Vavers, Ace Glass, ND Okafor
- Pepperdine: Styles Phipps, Aaron Clark, Stefan Cicic, Yonatan Levy, Javon Cooley

ESPN+

Feb. 28
5 p.m. PST

Recap

Washington State Cougars 79, Pepperdine Waves 88
Scoring by half: 28-36, 51-52
Pts: Ace Glass 22; Rebs: ND Okafor 10; Asts: Eemeli Yalaho, Adria Rodriguez 4	Pts: Stefan Cicic 23; Rebs: Stefan Cicic 10; Asts: Styles Phipps 9

Firestone Fieldhouse
Malibu, CA
Attendance: 792
Referees: Frank Harvey, Mark Fulton, Wacey Lym

=== vs. Portland (WCC Tournament - Second Round) ===
Broadcasters: Roxy Bernstein, Dan Dickau and Mariluz Cook

Series history: Washington State leads 16-2
Starting lineups:

- Portland: Jermaine Ballisager Webb, Dante Censori-Hercules, Garrett Nuckolls, James O'Donnell, Joel Foxwell
- Washington State: Eemeli Yalaho, Jerone Morton, Rihards Vavers, Ace Glass, ND Okafor

ESPN+

Mar. 6
6 p.m. PST

Recap

Portland Pilots 74, Washington State Cougars 68
Scoring by half: 25-29, 49-39
Pts: Garrett Nuckolls 23; Rebs: Jermaine Ballisager Webb 12; Asts: Joel Foxwell 5	Pts: Ace Glass 19; Rebs: Eemeli Yalaho, ND Okafor 6 Asts: Jerone Morton, Ace Glass 5

Orleans Arena
Las Vegas, NV
Attendance: 1,890
Referees: Deldre Carr, Kelly Pfeiffer, Tommy Johnson
