= 2025–26 Idaho State Bengals men's basketball team =

American college basketball season

2025–26 Idaho State Bengals men's basketball
- Conference: Big Sky Conference
- Record: 13–20 (5–13 Big Sky)
- Head coach: Ryan Looney (7th season)
- Associate head coach: Joe White
- Assistant coaches: Devin Kastrup; CJ Edwards; Navid Hussain
- Home arena: Reed Gym

2025–26 Big Sky men's basketball standings
	Conf.				Overall
Team	W		L	PCT	W		L	PCT
Portland State	13	–	5	.722	20	–	11	.645
Montana State	12	–	6	.667	18	–	14	.563
Eastern Washington	11	–	7	.611	14	–	19	.424
Montana	10	–	8	.556	18	–	16	.529
Northern Colorado	10	–	8	.556	20	–	12	.625
Weber State	10	–	8	.556	16	–	16	.500
Idaho †	9	–	9	.500	21	–	15	.583
Sacramento State	6	–	12	.333	10	–	21	.323
Idaho State	5	–	13	.278	13	–	20	.394
Northern Arizona	4	–	14	.222	10	–	22	.313
† 2026 Big Sky tournament winner

The 2025–26 Idaho State Bengals men's basketball team represented Idaho State University during the 2025–26 NCAA Division I men's basketball season. The Bengals, led by seventh-year head coach Ryan Looney, played their home games at Reed Gym in Pocatello, Idaho as members of the Big Sky Conference.

== Previous season ==
The Bengals finished the 2024–25 season 15–15, 10–8 in Big Sky play, to finish in fourth place. They were subsequently defeated by Montana State in the first round of the Big Sky conference tournament.

== Offseason ==
=== Departures ===
Departures
Name	Number	Pos.	Height	Weight	Year	Hometown	Notes
Joey Madimba	0	G	6' 5"	205	Junior	Mansfield, TX	Transferred to Prairie View A&M
Dylan Darling	1	G	6' 1"	175	RS Sophomore	Spokane, WA	Transferred to St. John's
Nick Ghetie	2	G	5' 11"	175	Freshman	Lake Oswego, OR	Transferred to Saint Leo
Quentin Meza	3	G	6' 0"	180	Sophomore	West Valley City, UT	Transferred to Hawai'i Pacific
Jake O'Neil	8	G	6' 4"	210	GS	Fruitland, ID	Exhausted eligibility
Isaiah Griffin	12	F	6' 6"	210	Senior	Raleigh, NC	Transferred to Western Illinois
AJ Burgin	13	G	6' 3"	205	Senior	San Diego, CA	Graduated
Covy Kelly	14	G	6' 2"	182	Senior	Garden Valley, ID	Graduated
Jackson Greene	21	F	6' 7"	215	Junior	Atlanta, GA	Transferred to Oklahoma Baptist
Justin Graham	24	F	6' 7"	200	Senior	Colorado Springs, CO	Graduated

=== Incoming transfers ===
Incoming transfers
Name	Number	Pos.	Height	Weight	Year	Hometown	Previous school
Lachlan Brewer	12	G/F	6'6"	210	Sophomore	Launceston, Tasmania	Sacramento State
Jamison Guerra	2	G	6' 0"	200	Graduate Student	Sherwood, OR	Oregon Tech
Quin Patterson	21	G/F	6' 7"	205	RS Junior	Snoqualmie, WA	UC San Diego
Caleb Van De Griend	24	F	6' 8"	255	Senior	Bridgetown, Western Australia	Minot State

=== Recruiting class ===
College recruiting
Name	Hometown	School	Height	Weight	Commit date
Louis Bond; SF	Los Angeles, CA	Windward School	6 ft 5 in (1.96 m)	185 lb (84 kg)	-
Louis Bond; SF	Recruit ratings: Scout: Rivals: 247Sports: (NR)				
Landen Birley; G	Yakima, WA	West Valley High School	6 ft 4 in (1.93 m)	180 lb (82 kg)	-
Landen Birley; G	Recruit ratings: Scout: Rivals: 247Sports: (NR)				
Overall recruit ranking:
Note: In many cases, Scout, Rivals, 247Sports, On3, and ESPN may conflict in their listings of height and weight.; In these cases, the average was taken. ESPN grades are on a 100-point scale.; Sources: "2025 Team Ranking". Rivals.

== Roster ==
2025–26 Idaho State Bengals men's basketball team
Players
Coaches

Pos.	#	Name	Height	Weight	Year	Previous school	Hometown
G	0	Gus Etchison	5 ft 11 in (1.8 m)	150 lb (68 kg)	RS Sr	Marian University	Arcadia, IN
G	2	Jamison Guerra	6 ft 0 in (1.83 m)	200 lb (91 kg)	GS	Oregon Tech	Sherwood, OR
G	3	Landen Birley	6 ft 4 in (1.93 m)	180 lb (82 kg)	Fr	West Valley High School	Yakima, WA
G	4	Jaedyn Brown	6 ft 5 in (1.96 m)	185 lb (84 kg)	RS So	Pullman High School	Pullman, WA
G	5	Cheikh Sow	6 ft 7 in (2.01 m)	195 lb (88 kg)	RS Jr	Cloud County CC	Thiès, Senegal
G/F	8	Trey Arland (W)	6 ft 7 in (2.01 m)	190 lb (86 kg)	Jr	Walla Walla CC	Kennewick, WA
F	10	Connor Hollenbeck	6 ft 7 in (2.01 m)	225 lb (102 kg)	GS	Minot State	Rapid City, SD
G	11	Martin Kheil	6 ft 5 in (1.96 m)	205 lb (93 kg)	So	Get Better Academy	Jindřichův Hradec, CZ
G/F	12	Lachlan Brewer	6 ft 6 in (1.98 m)	210 lb (95 kg)	So	Sacramento State	Launceston, Tasmania
G	13	Louis Bond	6 ft 5 in (1.96 m)	185 lb (84 kg)	Fr	Windward School	Los Angeles, CA
G	14	Kasen Carpenter	6 ft 5 in (1.96 m)	190 lb (86 kg)	Sr	Lewis-Clark State College	Rupert, ID
G/F	21	Quin Patterson	6 ft 7 in (2.01 m)	205 lb (93 kg)	RS Jr	UC San Diego	Snoqualmie, WA
F	24	Caleb Van De Griend	6 ft 8 in (2.03 m)	255 lb (116 kg)	Sr	Minot State	Bridgetown, Australia
F	30	Evan Otten	6 ft 11 in (2.11 m)	240 lb (109 kg)	RS So	Redmond High School	Redmond, OR
F	32	Blake Daberkow	6 ft 10 in (2.08 m)	235 lb (107 kg)	Sr	Central CC	Lincoln, NE

Head coach

- Ryan Looney (Eastern Oregon)

Assistant coach(es)

- Joe White (Southern Oregon)
- Devin Kastrup (Western Colorado)
- CJ Edwards (LeTourneau University)
- Navid Hussain (McMaster University)

Legend

- (C) Team captain
- (S) Suspended
- (I) Ineligible
- (W) Walk-on
- Injured
- Current redshirt

Roster
Last update: November 5, 2025

== Schedule and results ==
Date time, TV	Rank^{#}	Opponent^{#}	Result	Record	High points	High rebounds	High assists	Site (attendance) city, state
Exhibition
October 24, 2025*; 7:00 p.m., ESPN+		Northwest University	W 98–54	–	19 – Daberkow	6 – Sow	4 – Guerra	Reed Gym; Pocatello, ID
Non-conference regular season
November 4, 2025*; 7:00 p.m., ESPN+		Park University Gilbert	W 81–71	1–0	18 – Hollenbeck	10 – Hollenbeck	6 – Guerra	Reed Gym (1,101); Pocatello
November 7, 2025*; 8:00 p.m., ESPN+		at San Diego	W 71–68	2–0	18 – Hollenbeck	7 – Hollenbeck	3 – Tied	Jenny Craig Pavilion (781); San Diego, CA
November 9, 2025*; 3:00 p.m., MW Network		at San Diego State	L 57–73	2–1	17 – Hollenbeck	5 – Tied	6 – Guerra	Viejas Arena (11,526); San Diego, CA
November 15, 2025*; 8:00 p.m., ESPN+		at Seattle	L 74–83	2–2	25 – Van De Griend	10 – Van De Griend	5 – Hollenbeck	Redhawk Center (875); Seattle, WA
November 18, 2025*; 8:00 p.m., ESPN+		at Santa Clara	L 55–64	2–3	15 – Kheil	8 – Otten	4 – Tied	Leavey Center (1,071); Santa Clara, CA
November 21, 2025*; 1:00 p.m., ESPN+		Justice	W 89–51	3–3	29 – Van De Griend	10 – Van De Griend	6 – Guerra	Reed Gym; Pocatello, ID
November 26, 2025*; 4:30 p.m., ESPN+		vs. Sam Houston State; Holiday Hoops Classic	L 81–84	3–4	18 – Kheil	7 – Van De Griend	6 – Guerra	Idaho Central Arena; Boise, ID
November 28, 2025*; 4:30 p.m., ESPN+		vs. Cal State Northridge; Holiday Hoops Classic	W 82–50	4–4	14 – Etchison	8 – Otten	4 – Tied	Idaho Central Arena; Boise, ID
December 3, 2025*; 6:00 p.m., SL Network		at Kansas City; Big Sky–Summit League Challenge	W 68–59	5–4	14 – Van De Griend	10 – Van De Griend	5 – Guerra	Swinney Recreation Center (667); Kansas City, MO
December 6, 2025*; 4:00 p.m., ESPN+		Denver; Big Sky-Summit League Challenge	W 93–79	6–4	19 – Kheil	7 – Brewer	5 – Guerra	Reed Gym (1,215); Pocatello, ID
December 10, 2025*; 6:00 p.m., ESPN+		at Utah Valley	L 69–73	6–5	17 – Hollenbeck	5 – Guerra	6 – Guerra	UCCU Center (1,423); Orem, UT
December 18, 2025*; 7:00 p.m., ESPN+		Montana Western	W 80–64	7–5	18 – Hollenbeck	8 – Otten	4 – Guerra	Reed Gym (1,133); Pocatello, ID
December 21, 2025*; 4:00 p.m., ESPN+		UC Davis	L 83–93	7–6	19 – Bond	8 – Hollenbeck	3 – Guerra	Reed Gym (1,066); Pocatello, ID
Big Sky regular season
January 1, 2026; 7:00 p.m., ESPN+		Sacramento State	W 97–84	8–6 (1–0)	24 – Guerra	10 – Van De Griend	6 – Guerra	Reed Gym; Pocatello, ID
January 3, 2026; 4:00 p.m., ESPN+		Portland State	L 87–93 ^{OT}	8–7 (1–1)	20 – Kheil	10 – Van De Griend	10 – Guerra	Reed Gym (1,292); Pocatello, ID
January 8, 2026; 6:00 p.m., ESPN+		at Northern Colorado	L 72–85	8–8 (1–2)	26 – Guerra	12 – Sow	1 – Tied	Bank of Colorado Arena (1,110); Greeley, CO
January 10, 2026; 6:00 p.m., ESPN+		at Northern Arizoma	W 81–79	9–8 (2–2)	22 – Guerra	8 – Hollenbeck	6 – Guerra	Walkup Skydome (642); Flagstaff, AZ
January 15, 2026; 7:00 p.m., ESPN+		Idaho; Battle of the Domes	W 76–68	10–8 (3–2)	21 – Guerra	11 – Sow	6 – Guerra	Reed Gym (1,896); Pocatello, ID
January 17, 2026; 4:00 p.m., ESPN+		Eastern Washington	L 66–84	10–9 (3–3)	15 – Hollenbeck	7 – Otten	6 – Guerra	Reed Gym; Pocatello, ID
January 22, 2026; 7:00 p.m., ESPN+		at Montana State	L 62–74	10–10 (3–4)	20 – Etchison	10 – Van De Griend	5 – Etchison	Brick Breeden Fieldhouse (2,885); Bozeman, MT
January 24, 2026; 4:00 p.m., ESPN+		Montana	L 60–69	10–11 (3–5)	18 – Hollenbeck	7 – Hollenbeck	3 – Etchison	Dahlberg Arena (4,103); Missoula, MT
January 31, 2026; 1:00 p.m., ESPN+		Weber State	L 79–81	10–12 (3–6)	27 – Hollenbeck	7 – Tied	6 – Guerra	Dee Events Center (3,015); Ogden, UT
February 2, 2026; 8:00 p.m., ESPN+		at Portland State	L 65–88	10–13 (3–7)	13 – Van De Griend	4 – Tied	5 – Guerra	Viking Pavilion (1,023); Portland, OR
February 5, 2026; 7:00 p.m., ESPN+		Northern Arizona	L 73–79	10–14 (3–8)	23 – Hollenbeck	6 – Tied	5 – Guerra	Reed Gym (1,331); Pocatello, ID
February 7, 2026; 4:00 p.m., ESPN+		Northern Colorado	L 61–69	10–15 (3–9)	13 – Van De Griend	12 – Van De Griend	4 – Guerra	Reed Gym (1,215); Pocatello, ID
February 12, 2026; 7:00 p.m., ESPN+		at Eastern Washington	L 75–88	10–16 (3–10)	16 – Hollenbeck	8 – Hollenbeck	3 – Guerra	Reese Court (1,282); Cheney, WA
February 14, 2026; 3:00 p.m., ESPN+		at Idaho; Battle of the Domes	L 69–99	10–17 (3–11)	13 – Van De Griend	5 – Van De Griend	4 – Etchison	ICCU Arena (2,326); Moscow, ID
February 19, 2026; 7:00 p.m., ESPN+		Montana	W 73–69	11–17 (4–11)	29 – Etchison	6 – Tied	2 – Tied	Reed Gym (1,217); Pocatello, ID
February 21, 2026; 4:00 p.m., ESPN+		Montana State	W 91–76	12–17 (5–11)	36 – Etchison	9 – Van De Griend	8 – Etchison	Reed Gym (1,686); Pocatello, ID
February 28, 2026; 4:00 p.m., ESPN+		Weber State	L 73–83	12–18 (5–12)	15 – Tied	8 – Van De Griend	7 – Etchison	Reed Gym (1,811); Pocatello, ID
March 2, 2026; 8:00 p.m., ESPN+		at Sacramento State	L 65–83	12–19 (5–13)	15 – Bond	6 – Daberkow	6 – Guerra	Hornets Nest (3,016); Sacramento, CA
Big Sky tournament
March 7, 2026; 5:30 p.m., ESPN+	(9)	vs. (10) Northern Arizona; First round	W 73–65	13–19	17 – Hollenbeck	13 – Hollenbeck	4 – Hollenbeck	Idaho Central Arena; Boise, ID
March 8, 2026; 5:30 p.m., ESPN+	(9)	vs. (1) Portland State; Quarterfinal	L 78–85	13–20	20 – Etchison	10 – Bond	4 – Tied	Idaho Central Arena; Boise, ID
*Non-conference game. ^{#}Rankings from AP poll. (#) Tournament seedings in parentheses. All times are in Mountain.
