= 2025–26 New Mexico Lobos men's basketball team =

American college basketball season

2025–26 New Mexico Lobos men's basketball

NIT, Semifinal
- Conference: Mountain West Conference
- Record: 26–11 (13–7 MW)
- Head coach: Eric Olen (1st season)
- Assistant coaches: Mikey Howell (1st season); Mike Roberts (1st season); Sam Stapleton (1st season); Tom Tankelewicz (1st season); Michael Wilder (1st season)
- Home arena: The Pit (Capacity: 15,411)

2025–26 Mountain West Conference men's basketball standings
	Conf.				Overall
Team	W		L	PCT	W		L	PCT
Utah State †	15	–	5	.750	29	–	7	.806
San Diego State	14	–	6	.700	22	–	11	.667
New Mexico	13	–	7	.650	26	–	11	.703
Grand Canyon	13	–	7	.650	20	–	12	.625
Nevada	12	–	8	.600	24	–	13	.649
Boise State	12	–	8	.600	20	–	12	.625
Colorado State	11	–	9	.550	21	–	13	.618
UNLV	11	–	9	.550	18	–	17	.514
Wyoming	9	–	11	.450	18	–	15	.545
Fresno State	7	–	13	.350	13	–	19	.406
San Jose State	3	–	17	.150	9	–	24	.273
Air Force	0	–	20	.000	3	–	29	.094
† 2026 Mountain West tournament winner

The 2025–26 New Mexico Lobos men's basketball team represented the University of New Mexico during the 2025–26 NCAA Division I men's basketball season. The Lobos, led by first-year head coach Eric Olen, played their home games at The Pit in Albuquerque, New Mexico as a member of the Mountain West Conference.

== Previous season ==
The Lobos finished the 2024-25 season 27–8, 17–3 in Mountain West play to finish in first place in the conference standings for the first time since 2013. As the 1-seed in the Mountain West Tournament they would defeat 8-seed San Jose State in the Quarterfinals before falling in the Semifinals to 5-seed Boise State. They still however received an at-large bit to the NCAA Tournament and were placed as the 10-seed in the South region. The Lobos defeated 7-seed Marquette in the First Round, but fell in the Second Round to 2-seed #8 Michigan State to end their season. Following the season on March 25, head coach Richard Pitino was hired to replace Sean Miller as the head coach at Xavier.

== Offseason ==
=== Departures ===
Name	Number	Pos.	Height	Weight	Year	Hometown	Reason for departure
CJ Noland	0	G	6'4"	220	Graduate	Waxahachie, TX	Out of eligibility
Braden Applehans	1	G	6'7"	195	(redshirt) Sophomore	Blue Springs, MO	Transferred to Drake
Donovan Dent	2	G	6'2"	185	Junior	Riverside, CA	Transferred to UCLA
Tru Washington	3	G	6'4"	195	Sophomore	Phoenix, AZ	Transferred to Miami (FL)
Kayde Dotson	4	F	6'2"	180	Freshman	Beaumont, TX	Transferred to Loyola Chicago
Atiki Ally Atiki	6	F	6'10"	210	Senior	Mwanza, Tanzania	Out of eligibility
Ibrahima Sacko	7	F	6'6"	240	Sophomore	Conakry, Guinea	Transferred to New Mexico State
Filip Borovićanin	8	F	6'9"	220	Junior	Belgrade, Serbia	Transferred to Xavier
Quinton Webb	11	G	6'6"	200	(redshirt) Sophomore	San Bernardino, CA	Transferred to Cal State Northridge
Daniel Thomas	13	F	6'8"	215	Freshman	Dallas, TX	Transferred to UNC Asheville
Deraje Agbaosi	21	F	6'7"	215	(redshirt) Junior	Union Township, NJ	Transferred to Cal State LA
Mustapha Amzil	22	F	6'9"	215	(redshirt) Senior	Helsinki, Finland	Signed with KB Trepça
Nelly Junior Joseph	23	C	6'10"	245	(redshirt) Senior	Benin City, Nigeria	Signed with SIG Strasbourg
Jovan Milicevic	24	F	6'10"	260	Freshman	Toronto, ON, Canada	Transferred to Xavier
Shane Douma-Sanchez	32	G	6'1"	175	(redshirt) Freshman	Laguna, NM	Transferred to Lower Columbia
Dylan Chavez	35	G	6'5"	185	Freshman	Albuquerque, NM	Entered transfer portal

=== Incoming transfers ===
Name	Number	Pos.	Height	Weight	Year	Hometown	Previous college
Kevin Patton Jr.	0	G	6'8"	200	Junior	Murrieta, CA	USC
Deyton Albury	1	G	6'3"	190	Senior	Nassau, Bahamas	Utah State
Tajavis Miller	2	F	6'4"	200	Senior	Lubbock, TX	North Dakota State
Luke Haupt	3	G	6'7"	215	(redshirt) Senior	San Diego, CA	Point Loma
Antonio Chol	5	F	6'9"	215	(redshirt) Junior	Buffalo, NY	Garden City CC
Chris Howell	8	G	6'6"	215	(redshirt) Senior	San Diego, CA	UC San Diego
Kallai Patton	11	C	6'4"	180	(redshirt) Freshman	Murrieta, CA	USC
Milos Vicentic	31	F	6'7"	210	Graduate	Belgrade, Serbia	UC San Diego
JT Rock	35	C	7'1"	255	(redshirt) Sophomore	Sioux Falls, SD	Iowa State

== Roster ==
2025–26 New Mexico Lobos men's basketball team
Players
Coaches

Pos.	#	Name	Height	Weight	Year	Previous school	Hometown
G	0	Kevin Patton Jr.	6 ft 8 in (2.03 m)	200 lb (91 kg)	Jr	USC	Murrieta, California
G	1	Deyton Albury	6 ft 3 in (1.91 m)	190 lb (86 kg)	Sr	Utah State	Nassau, Bahamas
G	2	Tajavis Miller	6 ft 4 in (1.93 m)	200 lb (91 kg)	Sr	North Dakota State	Lubbock, Texas
G	3	Luke Haupt	6 ft 7 in (2.01 m)	215 lb (98 kg)	RS Sr	Point Loma	San Diego, California
G	4	Uriah Tenette	5 ft 11 in (1.8 m)	165 lb (75 kg)	Fr	Prescott HS	North Highlands, California
G	5	Antonio Chol	6 ft 9 in (2.06 m)	215 lb (98 kg)	RS Jr	Garden City CC	Buffalo, New York
G	7	Sir Marius Jones	6 ft 4 in (1.93 m)	195 lb (88 kg)	Fr	Sacramento HS	Oroville, California
G	8	Chris Howell	6 ft 6 in (1.98 m)	215 lb (98 kg)	RS Sr	UC San Diego	San Diego, California
F	10	Tomislav Buljan	6 ft 9 in (2.06 m)	250 lb (113 kg)	Fr	KK Cedevita Junior	Split, Croatia
G	11	Kallai Patton (W)	6 ft 4 in (1.93 m)	180 lb (82 kg)	RS Fr	USC	Murrieta, California
G	23	Jake Hall	6 ft 4 in (1.93 m)	200 lb (91 kg)	Fr	Carlsbad HS	Carlsbad, California
G	29	Timéo Pons	6 ft 9 in (2.06 m)	195 lb (88 kg)	Fr	Nanterre 92	Nanterre, France
F	31	Milos Vicentic	6 ft 7 in (2.01 m)	210 lb (95 kg)	GS	UC San Diego	Belgrade, Serbia
C	35	JT Rock	7 ft 1 in (2.16 m)	255 lb (116 kg)	RS So	Iowa State	Sioux Falls, South Dakota

Head coach

- Eric Olen (Spring Hill)

Assistant coach(es)

- Mikey Howell (UC San Diego)
- Mike Roberts (Indiana)
- Sam Stapleton (Occidental)
- Tom Tankelewicz (Western Carolina)
- Michael Wilder (UC Irvine)

Legend

- (C) Team captain
- (S) Suspended
- (I) Ineligible
- (W) Walk-on
- Injured
- Current redshirt

Roster
Last update: October 20, 2025

== Schedule and results ==
Date time, TV	Rank^{#}	Opponent^{#}	Result	Record	High points	High rebounds	High assists	Site (attendance) city, state
Exhibition
October 25, 2025*; 7:00 p.m.		at Washington State	L 66–74		11 – Tied	9 – Buljan	4 – Howell	Beasley Coliseum (670); Pullman, WA
October 30, 2025*; 7:00 p.m.		Northern Arizona	W 64–54		20 – Chol	7 – Buljan	5 – Howell	The Pit (9,728); Albuquerque, NM
Non-conference regular season
November 5, 2025*; 7:00 p.m., MW Network		East Texas A&M	W 76–54	1–0	14 – Tied	15 – Buljan	5 – Tenette	The Pit (10,276); Albuquerque, NM
November 8, 2025*; 2:00 p.m., MW Network		UT Arlington	W 74–56	2–0	17 – Buljan	6 – Haupt	5 – Howell	The Pit (11,513); Albuquerque, NM
November 11, 2025*; 7:00 p.m., MW Network		UC Riverside	W 82–68	3–0	15 – Howell	11 – Buljan	5 – Howell	The Pit (11,689); Albuquerque, NM
November 15, 2025*; 7:00 p.m., ESPN+		at New Mexico State; Rio Grande Rivalry	L 68–76	3–1	18 – Albury	13 – Buljan	3 – Howell	Pan American Center (8,106); Las Cruces, NM
November 20, 2025*; 5:00 p.m., Peacock/NBCSN		vs. Nebraska; Hall of Fame Classic semifinals	L 72–84	3–2	20 – Hall	7 – Tied	6 – Howell	T-Mobile Center (5,278); Kansas City, MO
November 21, 2025*; 5:00 p.m., Peacock/NBCSN		vs. Mississippi State; Hall of Fame Classic 3rd place game	W 80–78	4–2	19 – Buljan	21 – Buljan	3 – Tied	T-Mobile Center; Kansas City, MO
November 26, 2025*; 7:00 p.m., MW Network		Alabama State	W 93–87	5–2	24 – Hall	7 – Buljan	5 – Tied	The Pit (12,027); Albuquerque, NM
December 1, 2025*; 7:00 p.m., MW Network		New Mexico Highlands	W 97–47	6–2	21 – Hall	9 – Rock	6 – Tied	The Pit (10,164); Albuquerque, NM
December 6, 2025*; 7:00 p.m., MW Network		Santa Clara	W 98–71	7–2	22 – Albury	10 – Buljan	6 – Albury	The Pit (13,614); Albuquerque, NM
December 10, 2025*; 5:00 p.m., ESPN+		at VCU	W 81–78	8–2	24 – Hall	7 – Haupt	2 – Tied	Siegel Center (7,637); Richmond, VA
December 14, 2025*; 2:00 p.m., MW Network		Florida Gulf Coast	W 75–59	9–2	14 – Chol	7 – Tied	6 – Haupt	The Pit (12,204); Albuquerque, NM
Mountain West regular season
December 20, 2025; 7:00 p.m., MW Network		San Jose State	W 88–65	10–2 (1–0)	19 – Vicentic	5 – Tied	7 – Albury	The Pit (12,785); Albuquerque, NM
December 30, 2025; 9:00 p.m., FS1		at Boise State	L 53–62	10–3 (1–1)	16 – Buljan	10 – Buljan	2 – Albury	ExtraMile Arena (9,980); Boise, ID
January 3, 2026; 6:00 p.m., CBSSN		Wyoming	W 78–58	11–3 (2–1)	25 – Buljan	10 – Buljan	7 – Albury	The Pit (13,763); Albuquerque, NM
January 6, 2026; 7:00 p.m., MW Network		at Colorado State	W 80–70	12–3 (3–1)	18 – Hall	11 – Buljan	4 – Tied	Moby Arena (3,640); Fort Collins, CO
January 10, 2026; 1:00 p.m., MW Network		at Air Force	W 91–49	13–3 (4–1)	24 – Hall	14 – Buljan	5 – Haupt	Clune Arena (2,017); Colorado Springs, CO
January 13, 2026; 7:00 p.m., MW Network		Grand Canyon	W 87–64	14–3 (5–1)	22 – Hall	7 – Haupt	4 – Albury	The Pit (12,512); Albuquerque, NM
January 17, 2026; 6:00 p.m., CBSSN		at San Diego State	L 78–82	14–4 (5–2)	20 – Buljan	14 – Buljan	5 – Hall	Viejas Arena (12,414); San Diego, CA
January 21, 2026; 7:00 p.m., CBSSN		Fresno State	W 83–74	15–4 (6–2)	16 – Hall	10 – Buljan	6 – Haupt	The Pit (11,924); Albuquerque, NM
January 24, 2026; 6:00 p.m., FS1		Nevada	W 80–73	16–4 (7–2)	19 – Hall	19 – Buljian	5 – Tenette	The Pit (14,639); Albuquerque, NM
January 27, 2026; 9:00 p.m., CBSSN		at UNLV	W 89–61	17–4 (8–2)	18 – Buljan	11 – Buljan	6 – Haupt	Thomas & Mack Center (5,642); Paradise, NV
January 31, 2026; 8:00 p.m., CBSSN		at San Jose State	W 90–80	18–4 (9–2)	27 – Hall	10 – Buljan	5 – Albury	Provident Credit Union Event Center (4,189); San Jose, CA
February 4, 2026; 9:00 p.m., FS1		Utah State	L 68–88	18–5 (9–3)	17 – Buljan	7 – Tied	3 – Tenette	The Pit (14,419); Albuquerque, NM
February 7, 2026; 8:00 p.m., CBSSN		Boise State	L 90–91	18–6 (9–4)	30 – Haupt	9 – Buljan	5 – Tenette	The Pit (14,379); Albuquerque, NM
February 11, 2026; 8:00 p.m., FS1		at Grand Canyon	W 70–64	19–6 (10–4)	23 – Hall	9 – Buljan	3 – Haupt	Global Credit Union Arena (6,988); Phoenix, AZ
February 17, 2026; 7:00 p.m., MW Network		Air Force	W 98–61	20–6 (11–4)	20 – Chol	10 – Buljan	6 – Albury	The Pit (12,291); Albuquerque, NM
February 21, 2026; 6:00 p.m., CBSSN		at Fresno State	W 80–78	21–6 (12–4)	21 – Albury	8 – Albury	2 – Buljan	Save Mart Center (5,402); Fresno, CA
February 24, 2026; 9:00 p.m., CBSSN		at Nevada	L 60−67	21−7 (12−5)	17 – Hall	12 – Buljan	3 – Tied	Lawlor Events Center (8,020); Reno, NV
February 28, 2026; 12:00 p.m., CBS		San Diego State	W 81–76	22–7 (13–5)	24 – Buljan	18 – Buljan	5 – Tenette	The Pit (15,411); Albuquerque, NM
March 4, 2026; 8:00 p.m., CBSSN		Colorado State	L 74–82	22–8 (13–6)	22 – Albury	12 – Buljan	3 – Tied	The Pit (14,051); Albuquerque, NM
March 7, 2026; 2:00 p.m., MW Network		at Utah State	L 90–94	22–9 (13–7)	32 – Hall	13 – Buljan	7 – Tenette	Smith Spectrum (10,270); Logan, UT
Mountain West tournament
March 12, 2026; 9:30 p.m., CBSSN	(3)	vs. (11) San Jose State; Quarterfinal	W 93–77	23–9	25 – Buljan	14 – Buljan	9 – Tenette	Thomas & Mack Center (6,236); Paradise, NV
March 13, 2026; 10:00 p.m., CBSSN	(3)	vs. (2) San Diego State; Semifinal	L 62–64	23–10	20 – Albury	10 – Buljan	4 – Tied	Thomas & Mack Center (9,048); Paradise, NV
NIT
March 18, 2026; 7:00 p.m., ESPN+	(1 AL)	Sam Houston; First round	W 107–83	24–10	22 – Buljan	10 – Buljan	6 – Tied	The Pit (7,286); Albuquerque, NM
March 22, 2026; 6:00 p.m., ESPN+	(1 AL)	George Washington; Second round	W 86–61	25–10	19 – Hall	9 – Buljan	6 – Tied	The Pit (9,207); Albuquerque, NM
March 24, 2026; 7:00 p.m., ESPN2	(1 AL)	Saint Joseph's; Quarterfinal	W 84–69	26–10	27 – Buljan	11 – Buljan	5 – Haupt	The Pit (8,054); Albuquerque, NM
April 2, 2026; 5:00 p.m., ESPN	(1 AL)	vs. (1 T) Tulsa; Semifinal	L 69–74	26–11	18 – Hall	7 – Tied	4 – Tenette	Hinkle Fieldhouse (4,625); Indianapolis, IN
*Non-conference game. ^{#}Rankings from AP Poll. (#) Tournament seedings in parentheses. AL=Albuquerque. T=Tulsa. All times are in Mountain Time.
