= 2025–26 San Diego Toreros men's basketball team =

American college basketball season

2025–26 San Diego Toreros men's basketball
- Conference: West Coast Conference
- Record: 12–21 (5–13 WCC)
- Head coach: Steve Lavin (4th season)
- Assistant coaches: John Moore (4th season); Patrick Sandle (4th season); Ryan Devlin (1st season); Billy McKnight (1st season); Alan Major (1st season)
- Home arena: Jenny Craig Pavilion

2025–26 West Coast Conference men's basketball standings
	Conf.				Overall
Team	W		L	PCT	W		L	PCT
No. 12 Gonzaga	16	–	2	.889	28	–	3	.903
No. 21 Saint Mary's	16	–	2	.889	27	–	4	.871
Santa Clara	15	–	3	.833	24	–	7	.774
Oregon State	9	–	9	.500	16	–	15	.516
San Francisco	8	–	10	.444	16	–	15	.516
Pacific	8	–	10	.444	17	–	14	.548
Seattle	8	–	10	.444	20	–	12	.625
Washington State	7	–	11	.389	12	–	20	.375
Portland	6	–	12	.333	15	–	18	.455
Loyola Marymount	6	–	12	.333	15	–	17	.469
San Diego	5	–	13	.278	12	–	21	.364
Pepperdine	4	–	14	.222	9	–	23	.281
† 2026 WCC tournament winner As of March 6, 2026; Rankings from AP poll

The 2025–26 San Diego Toreros men's basketball team represented the University of San Diego during the 2025–26 NCAA Division I men's basketball season. The Toreros, led by fourth-year head coach Steve Lavin, played their home games at the Jenny Craig Pavilion in San Diego, California, as members of the West Coast Conference.

On February 18, 2026, the University announced that Lavin would not return as head coach following the season.

== Previous season ==
The Toreros finished the 2024–25 season 6–27, 2–16 in WCC play, to finish in eleventh (last) place. They defeated Pacific, before falling to Loyola Marymount in the second round of the WCC tournament.

== Preseason ==
On October 23, 2025, the West Coast Conference released their preseason poll. San Diego was picked to finish ninth in the conference.

=== Preseason rankings ===
WCC Preseason Poll
Place	Team	Votes
1	Gonzaga	119 (9)
2	Saint Mary's	109 (2)
3	San Francisco	98 (1)
4	Santa Clara	92
5	Oregon State	76
6	Washington State	69
7	Loyola Marymount	61
8	Seattle	53
9	San Diego	36
10	Pacific	32
11	Pepperdine	24
12	Portland	23
(#) first-place votes

=== Preseason All-WCC Team ===
No players were named to the Preseason All-WCC Team.

== Roster ==
2025–26 San Diego Toreros men's basketball team
Players
Coaches

Pos.	#	Name	Height	Weight	Year	Previous school	Hometown
G	0	Kjay Bradley Jr.	6 ft 1 in (1.85 m)	185 lb (84 kg)	Sr	San Diego City College	Inglewood, California
G	1	Toneari Lane	6 ft 5 in (1.96 m)	205 lb (93 kg)	GS	Georgia State	Atlanta, Georgia
G	2	Adrian McIntyre	6 ft 3 in (1.91 m)	195 lb (88 kg)	GS	Westmont College	Sylmar, California
F	3	D'Arrae Goodwin	6 ft 6 in (1.98 m)	205 lb (93 kg)	Fr	Linsly School	Wheeling, West Virginia
G	4	Juanse Gorosito	6 ft 0 in (1.83 m)	185 lb (84 kg)	Sr	Ball State	Ceres Santa Fe, Argentina
G	5	Ty-Laur Johnson	6 ft 0 in (1.83 m)	155 lb (70 kg)	Jr	Wake Forest	Brooklyn, New York
G	6	Boden Grant	6 ft 4 in (1.93 m)	185 lb (84 kg)	Fr	St. Edward High School	Cleveland, Ohio
F/C	7	Assane Diop	6 ft 9 in (2.06 m)	210 lb (95 kg)	Jr	Colorado	Rufisque, Senegal
G	9	Josh Hecht	6 ft 2 in (1.88 m)	185 lb (84 kg)	RS So	Santa Monica High School	Santa Monica, California
G	10	Neel Beniwal (W)	6 ft 5 in (1.96 m)	185 lb (84 kg)	RS Jr	The Phelps School	Garnet Valley, Pennsylvania
F	12	Gavin Ripp	6 ft 7 in (2.01 m)	230 lb (104 kg)	RS Fr	Archbishop Mitty High School	Los Gatos, California
G	14	Dominique Ford	6 ft 5 in (1.96 m)	200 lb (91 kg)	GS	Southern Utah	Las Vegas, Nevada
G	15	Caleb Versher	6 ft 3 in (1.91 m)	190 lb (86 kg)	Fr	St. Bernard High School	Los Angeles, California
F	21	Alejandro Aviles	6 ft 10 in (2.08 m)	230 lb (104 kg)	Fr	Dream City Christian School	San Juan, Puerto Rico
G	22	Emmanuel Callas (W)	6 ft 5 in (1.96 m)	220 lb (100 kg)	RS Jr	Campolindo High School	Oakland, California
C	23	Piotr Winkowski	6 ft 10 in (2.08 m)	240 lb (109 kg)	Jr	Astoria Bydgoszcz	Żyrardów, Poland
G	24	Brandon Benjamin	6 ft 6 in (1.98 m)	210 lb (95 kg)	Fr	Canyon High School	Anaheim, California
F	30	Tim Moore Jr.	6 ft 6 in (1.98 m)	213 lb (97 kg)	GS	NJIT	Houston, Texas
F	34	Vuk Boskovic	6 ft 7 in (2.01 m)	265 lb (120 kg)	Jr	SKK Borac 1947	Bileća, Bosnia and Herzegovina
G	53	Nick Del Bosque (W)	6 ft 0 in (1.83 m)	180 lb (82 kg)	RS So	Salpointe Catholic High School	Tucson, Arizona

Head coach

- Steve Lavin (Chapman)

Assistant coach(es)

- John Moore (Cypress)
- Patrick Sandle (San Francisco State)
- Ryan Devlin (Pittsburgh)
- Billy McKnight (Oregon)
- Alan Major (Purdue)

Legend

- (C) Team captain
- (S) Suspended
- (I) Ineligible
- (W) Walk-on
- Injured
- Current redshirt

Roster
Last update: December 8, 2025

== Schedule and results ==
Date time, TV	Rank^{#}	Opponent^{#}	Result	Record	High points	High rebounds	High assists	Site (attendance) city, state
Exhibition
October 18, 2025*; 2:00 pm, ESPN+		Cal State Dominguez Hills	Canceled due to "unforeseen transportation issues"					Jenny Craig Pavilion; San Diego, CA
October 29, 2025*; 7:00 pm		at San Diego State	L 54–87	–	12 – Johnson	3 – Tied	5 – Tied	Viejas Arena (11,545); San Diego, CA
Regular season
November 4, 2025*; 6:00 pm, ESPN+		Occidental	W 88–59	1–0	15 – Lane	8 – Diop	8 – Johnson	Jenny Craig Pavilion (417); San Diego, CA
November 7, 2025*; 6:00 pm, ESPN+		Idaho State	L 68–71	1–1	15 – Gorosito	5 – Tied	5 – Gorosito	Jenny Craig Pavilion (781); San Diego, CA
November 12, 2025*; 6:00 pm, ESPN+		Idaho	W 78–74	2–1	22 – Gorosito	6 – Boskovic	6 – Boskovic	Jenny Craig Pavilion (456); San Diego, CA
November 18, 2025*; 6:00 pm, ESPN+		Grambling State; Acrisure Series campus game	W 78−68	3−1	15 – Tied	6 – Johnson	6 – Johnson	Jenny Craig Pavilion (371); San Diego, CA
November 21, 2025*; 6:00 pm, ESPN+		UC Riverside; Acrisure Series campus game	L 71−85	3−2	15 – McIntyre	7 – Diop	5 – Boskovic	Jenny Craig Pavilion (1,589); San Diego, CA
November 25, 2025*; 3:30 pm, CBSSN		vs. California Baptist; Acrisure Series	L 61–76	3–3	21 – Johnson	5 – Gorosito	6 – Tied	Acrisure Arena; Thousand Palms, CA
November 30, 2025*; 2:00 pm, ESPN+		at Long Beach State	L 72–76	3–4	16 – Benjamin	5 – Tied	3 – Tied	Walter Pyramid (1,062); Long Beach, CA
December 5, 2025*; 7:00 pm, MWN		at San Jose State	L 69–86	3–5	17 – Moore Jr.	4 – McIntyre	6 – Johnson	Provident Credit Union Event Center (1,964); San Jose, CA
December 9, 2025*; 6:00 pm, ESPN2		USC	L 81–94	3–6	22 – Ford	6 – Aviles	4 – Gorosito	Jenny Craig Pavilion (2,317); San Diego, CA
December 13, 2025*; 3:00 pm, ESPN+		Northern Arizona	W 78–69	4–6	23 – Johnson	5 – Boskovic	4 – Tied	Jenny Craig Pavilion (1,119); San Diego, CA
December 19, 2025*; 7:00 pm, ESPN+		at UC San Diego	W 82–80	5–6	23 – Johnson	8 – Aviles	7 – Johnson	LionTree Arena (2,711); La Jolla, CA
December 22, 2025*; 7:00 pm, BTN		at Washington	L 56–86	5–7	15 – Tied	5 – Boskovic	3 – McIntyre	Alaska Airlines Arena (7,953); Seattle, WA
December 28, 2025; 3:00 pm, ESPN+		Pacific	W 66–54	6–7 (1–0)	22 – Johnson	10 – Boskovic	3 – Tied	Jenny Craig Pavilion (1,279); San Diego, CA
December 30, 2025; 6:30 pm, ESPN+		No. 7 Gonzaga	L 93–99	6–8 (1–1)	21 – Johnson	7 – McIntyre	7 – McIntyre	Jenny Craig Pavilion (3,521); San Diego, CA
January 2, 2026; 7:00 pm, ESPN+		at San Francisco	L 64–74	6–9 (1–2)	16 – McIntyre	10 – McIntyre	4 – Boskovic	Sobrato Center (1,048); San Francisco, CA
January 4, 2026; 4:00 pm, ESPN+		at Santa Clara	L 70–98	6–10 (1–3)	21 – Johnson	5 – Diop	7 – Johnson	Leavey Center (1,378); Santa Clara, CA
January 8, 2026; 6:30 pm, ESPN+		Pepperdine	W 83–63	7–10 (2–3)	16 – McIntyre	5 – Johnson	10 – Johnson	Jenny Craig Pavilion (809); San Diego, CA
January 10, 2026; 4:00 pm, ESPN+		at Pacific	L 70–77	7–11 (2–4)	19 – Johnson	7 – Tied	7 – Johnson	Alex G. Spanos Center (1,058); Stockton, CA
January 15, 2026; 7:00 pm, ESPN+		at Seattle	L 64–75	7–12 (2–5)	18 – Johnson	6 – Tied	9 – Johnson	Redhawk Center (978); Seattle, WA
January 17, 2026*; 3:00 pm, ESPN+		Bethesda	W 113–67	8–12	32 – Moore Jr.	15 – Diop	10 – Diop	Jenny Craig Pavilion (796); San Diego, CA
January 21, 2026; 6:30 pm, ESPN+		Washington State	L 92–96	9–12 (3–5)	28 – Johnson	7 – Diop	7 – Johnson	Jenny Craig Pavilion (855); San Diego, CA
January 24, 2026; 6:30 pm, ESPN+		Santa Clara	L 73–85	9–13 (3–6)	20 – McIntyre	6 – McIntyre	3 – Ripp	Jenny Craig Pavilion (1,619); San Diego, CA
January 28, 2026; 6:00 pm, ESPN+		at Pepperdine	W 92–88 ^{OT}	10–13 (4–6)	21 – Tied	17 – Diop	6 – Johnson	Firestone Fieldhouse (643); Malibu, CA
January 31, 2026; 3:00 pm, ESPN+		Oregon State	L 76–78 ^{OT}	10–14 (4–7)	21 – McIntyre	8 – Diop	7 – Johnson	Jenny Craig Pavilion (1,433); San Diego, CA
February 4, 2026; 7:00 pm, ESPN+		at Saint Mary's	L 60–87	10–15 (4–8)	16 – Lane	5 – Callas	4 – McIntyre	University Credit Union Pavilion (3,387); Moraga, CA
February 7, 2026; 6:00 pm, ESPN+		at LMU	L 63–83	10–16 (4–9)	14 – Ford	6 – Ford	3 – McIntyre	Gersten Pavilion (965); Los Angeles, CA
February 11, 2026; 6:30 pm, ESPN+		Portland	W 71–58	11–16 (5–9)	19 – Gorosito	7 – Diop	5 – Tied	Jenny Craig Pavilion (1,345); San Diego, CA
February 15, 2026; 3:00 pm, ESPN+		San Francisco	L 79–92	11–17 (5–10)	22 – Masic	13 – Fuchs	9 – Beasley	Jenny Craig Pavilion (1,396); San Diego, CA
February 21, 2026; 3:00 pm, ESPN+		LMU	L 65–77	11–18 (5–11)	19 – Lane	7 – Ripp	4 – McIntyre	Jenny Craig Pavilion (1,671); San Diego, CA
February 25, 2026; 7:00 pm, ESPN+		at Oregon State	L 82–92 ^{OT}	11–19 (5–12)	24 – Lane	7 – Diop	5 – Tied	Gill Coliseum (2,626); Corvallis, OR
February 28, 2026; 2:00 pm, ESPN+		at Portland	L 74–87	11–20 (5–13)	16 – Diop	5 – Diop	7 – Boskovic	Chiles Center (1,239); Portland, OR
WCC tournament
March 5, 2026; 8:30 p.m., ESPN+	(11)	vs. (10) Loyola Marymount; First Round	W 66–62	12–20	17 – McIntyre	9 – Diop	5 – McIntyre	Orleans Arena (1,242); Paradise, NV
March 6, 2026; 8:30 p.m., ESPN+	(11)	vs. (7) Seattle; Second Round	L 56–58	12–21	14 – Boskovic	11 – Diop	5 – Ripp	Orleans Arena (2,222); Paradise, NV
*Non-conference game. ^{#}Rankings from AP Poll. (#) Tournament seedings in parentheses. All times are in Pacific.
