= 2025–26 San Francisco Dons men's basketball team =

American college basketball season

2025–26 San Francisco Dons men's basketball
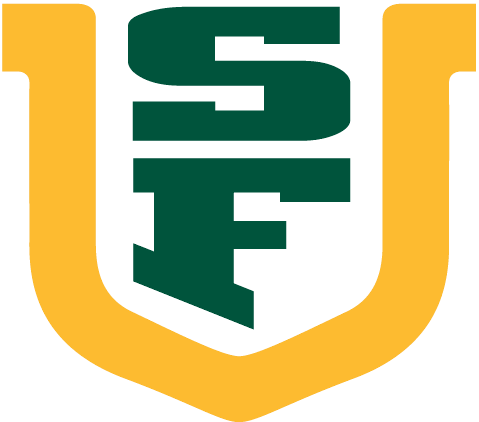
- Conference: West Coast Conference
- Record: 17–16 (8–10 WCC)
- Head coach: Chris Gerlufsen (4th season)
- Assistant coaches: Michael Plank; Jay Duncan; Kyle Bankhead; Vinnie McGhee; Frankie Ferrari
- Home arena: Sobrato Center (Capacity: 3,005); Chase Center (Capacity: 18,064)

2025–26 West Coast Conference men's basketball standings
	Conf.				Overall
Team	W		L	PCT	W		L	PCT
No. 18 Gonzaga †	16	–	2	.889	31	–	4	.886
Saint Mary's	16	–	2	.889	27	–	6	.818
Santa Clara	15	–	3	.833	26	–	9	.743
Oregon State	9	–	9	.500	17	–	16	.515
San Francisco	8	–	10	.444	17	–	16	.515
Pacific	8	–	10	.444	18	–	15	.545
Seattle	8	–	10	.444	21	–	14	.600
Washington State	7	–	11	.389	12	–	20	.375
Portland	6	–	12	.333	15	–	19	.441
Loyola Marymount	6	–	12	.333	15	–	17	.469
San Diego	5	–	13	.278	12	–	21	.364
Pepperdine	4	–	14	.222	9	–	23	.281
† 2026 WCC tournament winner Rankings from AP poll

The 2025–26 San Francisco Dons men's basketball team represented the University of San Francisco during the 2025–26 NCAA Division I men's basketball season. The Dons, led by fourth-year head coach Chris Gerlufsen, played their home games at the Sobrato Center and occasional games at the Chase Center, both in San Francisco, California, as members of the West Coast Conference (WCC).

== Previous season ==
The Dons finished the 2024–25 season 25–10, 13–5 in WCC play, to finish in third place. As the No. 3 seed in the WCC tournament, they defeated Washington State in the quarterfinals, before losing to Gonzaga in the semifinals for a fourth consecutive season. They received an at-large bid to the National Invitation Tournament as a No. 1 seed. They defeated Utah Valley 79–70 to record their first NIT win in 20 years before narrowly falling to Loyola Chicago 77–76 in the second round.

== Offseason ==
=== Departures ===
Name	Number	Pos.	Height	Weight	Year	Hometown	Reason for departure
Malik Thomas	1	G	6' 5"	205	Senior	Fontana, CA	Graduated/Transferred to Virginia
Carlton Lingard Jr.	2	C	7' 0"	235	Graduate Student	San Antonio, TX	Graduated
James O'Donnell	11	F	6' 9"	230	Freshman	Sydney, Australia	Transferred to Portland
Robby Beasley	13	G	6' 3"	188	Senior	San Ramon, CA	Graduated
Jason Rivera-Torres	23	G/F	6' 7"	190	Sophomore	The Bronx, NY	Transferred to Monmouth
Karl Markus Poom	34	F	6' 8"	210	Freshman	Tartu, Estonia	Walk-on; Transferred to Northern Arizona
Drew Ardouin	45	G	6' 4"	181	Junior	Atascadero, CA	Transferred to Cal Poly Humboldt
Marcus Williams	55	G	6' 2"	200	Senior	Dickinson, TX	Graduated

=== Incoming transfers ===
Name	Number	Pos.	Height	Weight	Year	Hometown	Previous school
Mookie Cook	1	F	6' 6"	215	Junior	Portland, OR	Oregon
Aidan Braccia	2	G	6' 1"	170	Junior	Hillsborough, CA	Belmont
Vukasin Masic	7	G	6' 5"	220	Graduate Student	Belgrade, Serbia	Portland
David Fuchs	8	F	6' 9"	245	Junior	Vienna, Austria	Rhode Island
Guillermo Diaz Graham	25	F	7' 0"	220	Senior	Canary Islands, Spain	Pittsburgh

=== Recruiting classes ===
==== 2025 recruiting class ====
College recruiting
Name	Hometown	School	Height	Weight	Commit date
Legend Smiley; SG	Seattle, WA	Link Academy (MO)	6 ft 5 in (1.96 m)	190 lb (86 kg)	May 25, 2025
Legend Smiley; SG	Recruit ratings: Rivals: 247Sports: ESPN: (82)				
Weilun Zhao; G	Varese, Italy	Overtime Elite/Pallacanestro Varese	6 ft 0 in (1.83 m)	175 lb (79 kg)	May 16, 2025
Weilun Zhao; G	Recruit ratings: No ratings found				
Overall recruit ranking: Scout: NR Rivals: NR ESPN: NR
Note: In many cases, Scout, Rivals, 247Sports, On3, and ESPN may conflict in their listings of height and weight.; In these cases, the average was taken. ESPN grades are on a 100-point scale.; Sources: "2025 San Francisco Dons Basketball Commits". Rivals.; "2025 San Francisco Dons Basketball Commits". Scout.; "ESPN". ESPN.; "Scout.com Team Recruiting Rankings". Scout.; "2025 Team Ranking". Rivals.

==== 2026 recruiting class ====
College recruiting (2026)
Name	Hometown	School	Height	Weight	Commit date
Andrew Hillman; SG	San Francisco, CA	Archbishop Riordan High School	6 ft 3 in (1.91 m)	180 lb (82 kg)	Sep 16, 2025
Andrew Hillman; SG	Recruit ratings: Rivals: 247Sports: ESPN: (82)				
Mason Magee; PG	Chandler, AZ	Basha High School	6 ft 0 in (1.83 m)	165 lb (75 kg)	Oct 10, 2025
Mason Magee; PG	Recruit ratings: Rivals: 247Sports: ESPN: (82)				
Overall recruit ranking: Rivals: 38 247Sports: 81 ESPN: NR
Note: In many cases, Scout, Rivals, 247Sports, On3, and ESPN may conflict in their listings of height and weight.; In these cases, the average was taken. ESPN grades are on a 100-point scale.; Sources: "2026 San Francisco Dons Basketball Commits". Rivals.; "2026 San Francisco Dons Basketball Commits". Scout.; "ESPN". ESPN.; "Scout.com Team Recruiting Rankings". Scout.; "2026 Team Ranking". Rivals.

== Roster ==
2025–26 San Francisco Dons men's basketball team
Players
Coaches

Pos.	#	Name	Height	Weight	Year	Previous school	Hometown
G	0	Ryan Beasley	5 ft 11 in (1.8 m)	180 lb (82 kg)	Jr	Dougherty Valley HS	San Ramon, CA
F	1	Mookie Cook	6 ft 6 in (1.98 m)	215 lb (98 kg)	Jr	Oregon	Portland, OR
G	2	Aidan Braccia (W)	6 ft 1 in (1.85 m)	170 lb (77 kg)	RS Jr	Belmont	Hillsborough, CA
F	3	Ndewedo Newbury (injured) (redshirt)	6 ft 7 in (2.01 m)	235 lb (107 kg)	GS	The Loomis Chaffee School	London, England
G	5	Tyrone Riley IV	6 ft 6 in (1.98 m)	200 lb (91 kg)	So	St. Pius X-St. Matthias	Downey, CA
G	7	Vukasin Masic	6 ft 5 in (1.96 m)	220 lb (100 kg)	GS	Portland	Belgrade, Serbia
F	8	David Fuchs	6 ft 9 in (2.06 m)	245 lb (111 kg)	Jr	Rhode Island	Vienna, Austria
C	10	Saba Gigiberia	7 ft 2 in (2.18 m)	255 lb (116 kg)	GS	Georgia Tech	Tbilisi, Georgia
G	12	Isa Silva	6 ft 4 in (1.93 m)	190 lb (86 kg)	RS Sr	Long Beach State	Sacramento, CA
G	13	Legend Smiley	6 ft 5 in (1.96 m)	190 lb (86 kg)	Fr	Link Academy (MO)	Seattle, WA
G/F	14	Veniamin Abosi	6 ft 6 in (1.98 m)	225 lb (102 kg)	So	Olympiacos B.C.	Heraklion, Greece
G/F	21	Sean Blakely Drummond (W)	6 ft 4 in (1.93 m)	190 lb (86 kg)	Fr	SoCal Academy	Palo Alto, CA
G	23	Weilun Zhao	6 ft 0 in (1.83 m)	175 lb (79 kg)	Fr	Overtime Elite/Pallacanestro Varese	Varese, Italy
F	25	Guillermo Díaz Graham	7 ft 0 in (2.13 m)	220 lb (100 kg)	Sr	Pittsburgh	Canary Islands, Spain
F	35	Junjie Wang	6 ft 9 in (2.06 m)	250 lb (113 kg)	Jr	NBA Global Academy	Xuzhou, China

Head coach

- Chris Gerlufsen (Randolph–Macon)

Assistant coach(es)

- Michael Plank (Willamette)
- Jay Duncan (Northwood)
- Kyle Bankhead (Gonzaga)
- Vinnie McGhee (Cal State Northridge)
- Frankie Ferrari (San Francisco)

Legend

- (C) Team captain
- (S) Suspended
- (I) Ineligible
- (W) Walk-on
- Injured
- Current redshirt

Roster
Last update: October 12, 2025

== Schedule and results ==
Date time, TV	Rank^{#}	Opponent^{#}	Result	Record	High points	High rebounds	High assists	Site (attendance) city, state
Exhibition
October 25, 2025*; 7:00 p.m.		Utah State	L 74–79	–	25 – Beasley	7 – Fuchs	6 – Fuchs	Sobrato Center (2,575); San Francisco, CA
Non-conference regular season
November 3, 2025*; 7:00 p.m., ESPN+		UC Santa Cruz	W 98–53	1–0	18 – Smiley	9 – Cook	9 – Masic	Sobrato Center (848); San Francisco, CA
November 8, 2025*; 12:00 p.m., ESPN+		at Memphis	L 70–76	1–1	18 – Cook	7 – Cook	4 – Masic	FedExForum (10,398); Memphis, TN
November 12, 2025*; 7:00 p.m., ESPN+		Portland State	W 80–70	2–1	23 – Beasley	6 – Tied	4 – Beasley	Sobrato Center (1,123); San Francisco, CA
November 15, 2025*; 7:00 p.m., ESPN+		Bradley	W 75–64	3–1	23 – Beasley	12 – Fuchs	5 – Beasley	Sobrato Center (2,182); San Francisco, CA
November 18, 2025*; 7:00 p.m., ESPN+		Northwestern State; Acrisure Series on-campus game	W 84–64	4–1	15 – Cook	5 – Tied	4 – Tied	Sobrato Center (1,280); San Francisco, CA
November 22, 2025*; 2:30 p.m., Peacock		vs. Minnesota	W 77–65	5–1	24 – Beasley	6 – Tied	4 – Tied	Sanford Pentagon (2,467); Sioux Falls, SD
November 27, 2025*; 11:00 AM, CBSSN		vs. Colorado; Acrisure Holiday Classic semifinal	L 69–79	5–2	13 – Tied	5 – Tied	4 – Fuchs	Acrisure Arena; Thousand Palms, CA
November 28, 2025*; 11:00 a.m., TruTV		vs. Nevada; Acrisure Holiday Classic third-place game	L 65–81	5–3	16 – Fuchs	9 – Fuchs	4 – Beasley	Acrisure Arena; Thousand Palms, CA
December 3, 2025*; 7:00 p.m., ESPN+		North Alabama	L 53–55	5–4	12 – Cook	8 – Gigiberia	4 – Riley IV	Sobrato Center (1,864); San Francisco, CA
December 7, 2025*; 1:00 p.m., SECN		vs. Mississippi State; T Town Tipoff	W 65–62	6–4	16 – Riley IV	11 – Cook	5 – Cook	Cadence Bank Arena; Tupelo, MS
December 13, 2025*; 5:00 p.m., ESPN+		at Saint Louis	L 75–85	6–5	21 – Beasley	7 – Cook	4 – Cook	Chaifetz Arena (5,814); St. Louis, MO
December 17, 2025*; 7:00 p.m., ESPN+		Loyola Chicago	W 85–71	7–5	22 – Riley IV	9 – Riley IV	5 – Tied	Chase Center (2,784); San Francisco, CA
December 21, 2025*; 3:00 p.m., ESPN+		Morgan State	W 94–64	8–5	23 – Fuchs	10 – Riley IV	3 – Tied	Sobrato Center (1,684); San Francisco, CA
WCC regular season
December 28, 2025; 5:00 p.m., ESPN+		at Seattle	W 67–59	9–5 (1–0)	15 – Masic	9 – Diaz Graham	4 – Beasley	Redhawk Center (999); Seattle, WA
December 30, 2025; 6:30 p.m., ESPN+		at Oregon State	L 62–70	9–6 (1–1)	19 – Fuchs	13 – Fuchs	2 – Tied	Gill Coliseum (2,506); Corvallis, OR
January 2, 2026; 7:00 p.m., ESPN+		San Diego	W 74–64	10–6 (2–1)	22 – Riley IV	12 – Wang	6 – Beasley	Sobrato Center (1,048); San Francisco, CA
January 4, 2026; 4:00 p.m., ESPN+		Portland	W 73–68	11–6 (3–1)	16 – Abosi	10 – Fuchs	4 – Beasley	Sobrato Center (1,088); San Francisco, CA
January 8, 2026; 8:00 p.m., CBSSN		at Loyola Marymount	L 82–84 ^{2OT}	11–7 (3–2)	32 – Beasley	9 – Diaz Graham	4 – Fuchs	Gersten Pavilion (889); Los Angeles, CA
January 10, 2026; 5:00 p.m., ESPN+		at Pepperdine	W 80–60	12–7 (4–2)	27 – Wang	12 – Fuchs	6 – Masic	Firestone Fieldhouse (645); Malibu, CA
January 13, 2026; 8:00 p.m., ESPN2		Saint Mary's	L 68–82	12–8 (4–3)	16 – Riley IV	11 – Fuchs	7 – Beasley	Sobrato Center (2,784); San Francisco, CA
January 18, 2026; 4:00 p.m., ESPN+		Washington State	W 85–80	13–8 (5–3)	15 – Wang	6 – Riley IV	6 – Tied	Sobrato Center (2,182); San Francisco, CA
January 24, 2026; 5:00 p.m., CBSSN		at No. 8 Gonzaga	L 66–68	13–9 (5–4)	18 – Smiley	10 – Riley IV	6 – Beasley	McCarthey Athletic Center (6,000); Spokane, WA
January 28, 2026; 8:00 p.m., CBSSN		at Santa Clara	L 73–88	13–10 (5–5)	15 – Diaz Graham	8 – Riley IV	5 – Diaz Graham	Leavey Center (2,000); Santa Clara, CA
January 31, 2026; 7:00 p.m., ESPN+		Pacific	W 87–82	14–10 (6–5)	30 – Fuchs	9 – Fuchs	11 – Beasley	Sobrato Center (2,102); San Francisco, CA
February 4, 2026; 7:00 p.m., ESPN+		Loyola Marymount	L 75–84	14–11 (6–6)	30 – Beasley	7 – Beasley	2 – Tied	Sobrato Center (1,878); San Francisco, CA
February 7, 2026; 8:30 p.m., ESPN2		at Saint Mary's	L 54–79	14–12 (6–7)	11 – Wang	10 – Fuchs	5 – Beasley	University Credit Union Pavilion (3,500); Moraga, CA
February 12, 2026; 6:00 p.m., ESPN2		Oregon State	L 63–90	14–13 (6–8)	17 – Beasley	11 – Fuchs	2 – Zhao	Sobrato Center (2,249); San Francisco, CA
February 15, 2026; 3:00 p.m., ESPN+		at San Diego	W 92–79	15–13 (7–8)	32 – Masic	13 – Fuchs	9 – Beasley	Jenny Craig Pavilion (1,396); San Diego, CA
February 18, 2026; 8.00 p.m., ESPN2		No. 11 Gonzaga	L 59–80	15–14 (7–9)	16 – Riley IV	6 – Fuchs	6 – Beasley	Chase Center (3,848); San Francisco, CA
February 21, 2026; 7:00 p.m., CBSSN		Santa Clara	L 73–94	15–15 (7–10)	22 – Beasley	6 – Cook	5 – Beasley	Sobrato Center (2,898); San Francisco, CA
February 28, 2026; 3:00 p.m., CBSSN		at Pacific	W 72–61	16–15 (8–10)	29 – Fuchs	7 – Fuchs	3 – Tied	Alex G. Spanos Center (2,597); Stockton, CA
WCC tournament
March 7, 2026; 6:00 p.m., ESPN+	(5)	vs. (9) Portland; Third round	W 82–65	17–15	23 – Fuchs	16 – Fuchs	4 – Beasley	Orleans Arena (2,505); Paradise, NV
March 8, 2026; 6:00 p.m., ESPN2	(5)	vs. (4) Oregon State; Quarterfinal	L 77–78	17–16	23 – Riley IV	12 – Fuchs	7 – Beasley	Orleans Arena (3,021); Paradise, NV
*Non-conference game. ^{#}Rankings from AP poll. (#) Tournament seedings in parentheses. All times are in Pacific.
