= 2025–26 Santa Clara Broncos men's basketball team =

American college basketball season

2025–26 Santa Clara Broncos men's basketball

NCAA tournament, First round
- Conference: West Coast Conference
- Record: 26–9 (15–3 WCC)
- Head coach: Herb Sendek (10th season)
- Assistant coaches: Jason Ludwig; Ryan Madry; Will Burkett; Jackson Gion; Mitch Smith
- Home arena: Leavey Center

2025–26 West Coast Conference men's basketball standings
	Conf.				Overall
Team	W		L	PCT	W		L	PCT
No. 18 Gonzaga †	16	–	2	.889	31	–	4	.886
Saint Mary's	16	–	2	.889	27	–	6	.818
Santa Clara	15	–	3	.833	26	–	9	.743
Oregon State	9	–	9	.500	17	–	16	.515
San Francisco	8	–	10	.444	17	–	16	.515
Pacific	8	–	10	.444	18	–	15	.545
Seattle	8	–	10	.444	21	–	14	.600
Washington State	7	–	11	.389	12	–	20	.375
Portland	6	–	12	.333	15	–	19	.441
Loyola Marymount	6	–	12	.333	15	–	17	.469
San Diego	5	–	13	.278	12	–	21	.364
Pepperdine	4	–	14	.222	9	–	23	.281
† 2026 WCC tournament winner Rankings from AP poll

The 2025–26 Santa Clara Broncos men's basketball team represented Santa Clara University during the 2025–26 NCAA Division I men's basketball season. The Broncos, led by tenth-year head coach Herb Sendek, played their home games at the Leavey Center as members of the West Coast Conference.

On July 21, 2025, the Broncos and Sendek agreed to an extension that last until the end of the 2029–30 season.

== Previous season ==
The Broncos finished the 2024–25 season 21–13, 12–6 in WCC play to finish in fourth place. In the WCC tournament, they were upset in the first round by Perpperdine in the quarterfinals. They received an at-large bid to the National Invitation Tournament as the No. 2 seed in the Irvine Region. They defeated UC Riverside 101–62 to record their first NIT win in 41 years before falling to UAB 88–84 in the second round.

== Offseason ==
=== Departures ===
Name	Number	Pos.	Height	Weight	Year	Hometown	Reason for departure
Tyeree Bryan	1	G	6'6"	205	Senior	Orlando, FL	Transferred to Texas Tech
Kosy Akametu	3	G	6'5"	210	(redshirt) Sophomore	Carson, CA	Transferred to Iona
Adama Bal	4	G	6'7"	190	Senior	Le Mans, France	Graduated, signed with the Westchester Knicks
Carlos Stewart	10	G	6'1"	185	Senior	Baton Rouge, LA	Graduated
Christoph Tilly	13	C	7'0"	240	Junior	Berlin, Germany	Transferred to Ohio State
Johnny O'Neil	14	F	6'10"	205	Senior	Miami Shores, FL	Graduated
Luke McEldon	20	F	6'10"	240	Sophomore	London, England	Transferred to Mount St. Mary's
Camaron Tongue	21	F	6'7"	220	Senior	Medfield, MA	Graduated

=== Incoming transfers ===
Name	Number	Pos.	Height	Weight	Year	Hometown	Previous School
Sash Gavalyugov	2	G	6'3"	175	(redshirt) Freshman	Botevgrad, Bulgaria	Villanova
Gehrig Normand	9	G	6'6"	190	(redshirt) Sophomore	North Richland Hills, TX	Michigan State
Chris Tadjo	14	F	6'7"	250	Sophomore	Montreal, Quebec	Iowa

=== 2025 recruiting class ===
On September 23, 2025, former G League Ignite and Delaware Blue Coats player Thierry Darlan signed with the Broncos after the NCAA granted him two years of eligibility, marking the first time a professional athlete who previously played in the NBA G League to play college basketball. The decision has been widely criticized by other coaches.

College recruiting
Name	Hometown	School	Height	Weight	Commit date
KJ Cochran; SG	West Chester, PA	Perkiomen School	6 ft 3 in (1.91 m)	165 lb (75 kg)	Sep 27, 2024
KJ Cochran; SG	Recruit ratings: Rivals: 247Sports: ESPN: (79)				
Francis Chukwudebelu; C	McKinney, TX	Argyle High School	6 ft 10 in (2.08 m)	217 lb (98 kg)	Oct 8, 2024
Francis Chukwudebelu; C	Recruit ratings: Rivals: 247Sports: ESPN: (79)				
Bradley Longcor III; PG	Quincy, IL	Quincy High School	6 ft 3 in (1.91 m)	170 lb (77 kg)	Jun 20, 2024
Bradley Longcor III; PG	Recruit ratings: 247Sports:				
Overall recruit ranking: Rivals: 56 247Sports: 60 ESPN: NR
Note: In many cases, Scout, Rivals, 247Sports, On3, and ESPN may conflict in their listings of height and weight.; In these cases, the average was taken. ESPN grades are on a 100-point scale.; Sources: "Santa Clara 2025 Basketball Commitments". Rivals.; "2025 Santa Clara Basketball Commits". Scout.; "ESPN". ESPN.; "Scout.com Team Recruiting Rankings". Scout.; "2025 Team Ranking". Rivals.

== Roster ==
2025–26 Santa Clara Broncos men's basketball team
Players
Coaches

Pos.	#	Name	Height	Weight	Year	Previous school	Hometown
G	0	Brenton Knapper	6 ft 0 in (1.83 m)	175 lb (79 kg)	RS Sr	Colony HS	Ontario, CA
G	1	Christian Hammond	6 ft 4 in (1.93 m)	195 lb (88 kg)	RS So	Dream City Christian (AZ)	Denver, CO
G	2	Sash Gavalyugov	6 ft 3 in (1.91 m)	175 lb (79 kg)	RS Fr	NBA Global Academy; Villanova	Botevgrad, Bulgaria
C	3	Francis Chukwudebelu	6 ft 10 in (2.08 m)	220 lb (100 kg)	Fr	Argyle High School	McKinney, TX
G	4	Bradley Longcor III	6 ft 4 in (1.93 m)	180 lb (82 kg)	Fr	Quincy High School	Quincy, IL
G	7	KJ Cochran	6 ft 5 in (1.96 m)	195 lb (88 kg)	Fr	Perkiomen School	West Chester, PA
F	8	Elijah Mahi	6 ft 7 in (2.01 m)	220 lb (100 kg)	Sr	Potter's House Christian (FL); West Valley College	Toronto, ON
F	9	Gehrig Normand	6 ft 6 in (1.98 m)	190 lb (86 kg)	RS So	Birdville High School; Michigan State	North Richland Hills, TX
F	10	Nolan Badibanga	6 ft 8 in (2.03 m)	185 lb (84 kg)	Fr	Élan Sportif Chalon	Toulouse, France
C	12	Bukky Oboye	7 ft 1 in (2.16 m)	220 lb (100 kg)	RS So	Clements HS	Sugar Land, TX
F	14	Chris Tadjo	6 ft 7 in (2.01 m)	250 lb (113 kg)	So	NBA Academy Latin America; Iowa	Montreal, Quebec
G	15	Thierry Darlan	6 ft 8 in (2.03 m)	210 lb (95 kg)	Jr	NBA Academy Africa; NBA G League Ignite; Delaware Blue Coats	Bangui, Central African Republic
F	22	Allen Graves	6 ft 9 in (2.06 m)	225 lb (102 kg)	RS Fr	Ponchatoula HS	Ponchatoula, LA
G	44	Jake Ensminger	6 ft 9 in (2.06 m)	215 lb (98 kg)	RS Jr	Ratiopharm Ulm	Ulm, Germany
G	50	Brendan Yarusso (W)	6 ft 1 in (1.85 m)	185 lb (84 kg)	Sr	St. Francis HS	Lombard, IL
G	51	Juan Reyna III (W)	6 ft 3 in (1.91 m)	190 lb (86 kg)	GS	Duncanville High School; UTSA; Jackson State	San Antonio, TX
G	54	Malachi Douyon (W)	6 ft 3 in (1.91 m)	185 lb (84 kg)	Sr	Pacific Collegiate Charter School	Santa Cruz, CA

Head coach

- Herb Sendek (Carnegie Mellon)

Assistant coach(es)

- Jason Ludwig (UCLA)
- Ryan Madry (West Georgia)
- Will Burkett (Santa Clara)
- Jackson Gion (Sonoma State)
- Mitch Smith (California)

Legend

- (C) Team captain
- (S) Suspended
- (I) Ineligible
- (W) Walk-on
- Injured
- Current redshirt

Roster

== Schedule and results ==
Date time, TV	Rank^{#}	Opponent^{#}	Result	Record	High points	High rebounds	High assists	Site (attendance) city, state
Non-conference regular season
November 4, 2025*; 7:00 p.m., ESPN+		Cal Poly Humboldt	W 83–53	1–0	14 – Mahi	13 – Darlan	4 – Tied	Leavey Center (1,116); Santa Clara, CA
November 7, 2025*; 7:00 p.m., ESPN+		McNeese	W 79–67	2–0	19 – Tied	13 – Graves	6 – Ensminger	Leavey Center (1,205); Santa Clara, CA
November 10, 2025*; 5:30 p.m., FS1		at Xavier	W 87−68	3−0	18 – Mahi	11 – Graves	3 – Tied	Cintas Center (9,830); Cincinnati, OH
November 15, 2025*; 4:00 p.m., ESPN+		Nevada	W 98–83	4–0	27 – Hammond	10 – Ensminger	6 – Toed	Leavey Center (1,741); Santa Clara, CA
November 18, 2025*; 7:00 p.m., ESPN+		Idaho State	W 64–55	5–0	16 – Hammond	9 – Tied	5 – Ensminger	Leavey Center (1,071); Santa Clara, CA
November 21, 2025*; 7:00 p.m., ESPN+		Louisiana; Acrisure Series campus-site game	W 80–43	6–0	19 – Hammond	11 – Ensminger	5 – Gavalyugov	Leavey Center (1,331); Santa Clara, CA
November 27, 2025*; 4:00 p.m., CBSSN		vs. Saint Louis; Acrisure Invitational semifinal	L 70–71	6–1	18 – Mahi	7 – Mahi	3 – Tied	Acrisure Arena; Thousand Palms, CA
November 28, 2025*; 6:30 p.m., TruTV		vs. Minnesota; Acrisure Invitational third-place game	W 86–75	7–1	20 – Hammond	6 – Darlan	6 – Graves	Acrisure Arena; Thousand Palms, CA
December 3, 2025*; 7:00 p.m., ESPN+		Utah Tech	W 90–80	8–1	14 – Tied	8 – Tied	8 – Knapper	Leavey Center (1,969); Santa Clara, CA
December 6, 2025*; 6:00 p.m., MW Network		at New Mexico	L 71–98	8–2	22 – Hammond	8 – Mahi	5 – Knapper	The Pit (13,614); Albuquerque, NM
December 13, 2025*; 3:30 p.m., TNT/TruTV		vs. Arizona State; Jack Jones Classic	L 79–82	8–3	22 – Hammond	6 – Mahi	5 – Ensminger	Lee's Family Forum; Henderson, NV
December 17, 2025*; 6:00 p.m., BallerTV		vs. North Texas	W 63−60	9–3	17 – Mahi	8 – Graves	5 – Gavalyugov	Kaiser Permanente Arena (120); Santa Cruz, CA
December 20, 2025*; 2:00 p.m., BallerTV		vs. Loyola Chicago	L 78–80	9–4	25 – Hammond	10 – Graves	5 – Ensminger	Kaiser Permanente Arena; Santa Cruz, CA
WCC regular season
December 28, 2025; 3:00 p.m., ESPN+		at Oregon State	W 102–64	10–4 (1–0)	23 – Mahi	8 – Ensminger	5 – Knapper	Gill Coliseum (3,050); Corvallis, OR
December 30, 2025; 7:00 p.m., ESPN+		at Portland	W 92–85	11–4 (2–0)	22 – Mahi	10 – Graves	5 – Hammond	Chiles Center (1,521); Portland, OR
January 2, 2026; 7:00 p.m., ESPN+		Pepperdine	W 82–63	12–4 (3–0)	20 – Hammond	7 – Oboye	3 – Tied	Leavey Center (1,158); Santa Clara, CA
January 4, 2026; 4:00 p.m., ESPN+		San Diego	W 98–70	13–4 (4–0)	21 – Hammond	9 – Graves	9 – Mahi	Leavey Center (1,378); Santa Clara, CA
January 8, 2026; 8:30 p.m., ESPN2		at No. 8 Gonzaga	L 77–89	13–5 (4–1)	18 – Graves	9 – Graves	3 – Tied	McCarthey Athletic Center (6,000); Spokane, WA
January 10, 2026; 7:00 p.m., ESPN+		Loyola Marymount	W 103–72	14–5 (5–1)	37 – Gavalyugov	11 – Ensminger	4 – Ensminger	Leavey Center (2,000); Santa Clara, CA
January 14, 2026; 7:00 p.m., ESPN+		Pacific	W 85–69	15–5 (6–1)	18 – Hammond	8 – Graves	4 – Gavalyugov	Leavey Center (1,558); Santa Clara, CA
January 17, 2026; 4:00 p.m., ESPN+		Saint Mary's	W 62–54	16–5 (7–1)	25 – Hammond	8 – Graves	2 – Tied	Leavey Center (2,700); Santa Clara, CA
January 24, 2026; 6:30 p.m., ESPN+		at San Diego	W 85–73	17–5 (8–1)	16 – Tied	8 – Oboye	5 – Ensminger	Jenny Craig Pavilion (1,619); San Diego, CA
January 28, 2026; 8:00 p.m., CBSSN		San Francisco	W 88–73	18–5 (9–1)	21 – Hammond	8 – Oboye	6 – Knapper	Leavey Center (2,000); Santa Clara, CA
January 31, 2026; 6:00 p.m., ESPN+		at Loyola Marymount	W 104–73	19–5 (10–1)	22 – Knapper	10 – Graves	6 – Gavalyugov	Gersten Pavilion (1,178); Los Angeles, CA
February 4, 2026; 7:00 p.m., ESPN+		at Pacific	W 71–56	20–5 (11–1)	13 – Ensminger	8 – Graves	3 – Tied	Alex G. Spanos Center (1,139); Stockton, CA
February 7, 2026; 3:00 p.m., ESPN+		at Washington State	W 96–92	21–5 (12–1)	30 – Graves	13 – Graves	4 – Graves	Beasley Coliseum (2,965); Pullman, WA
February 11, 2026; 7:00 p.m., ESPN+		Seattle	W 84–72	22–5 (13–1)	21 – Gavalyugov	6 – Hammond	7 – Mahi	Leavey Center (1,847); Santa Clara, CA
February 14, 2026; 7:30 p.m., ESPN		No. 12 Gonzaga	L 86–94	22–6 (13–2)	16 – Hammond	8 – Oboye	4 – Gavalyugov	Leavey Center (4,200); Santa Clara, CA
February 21, 2026; 7:00 p.m., CBSSN		at San Francisco	W 94–73	23–6 (14–2)	30 – Mahi	10 – Ensminger	3 – Tied	Sobrato Center (2,898); San Francisco, CA
February 25, 2026; 8:00 p.m., CBSSN		at Saint Mary's	L 67–86	23–7 (14–3)	20 – Graves	6 – Graves	3 – Gavalyugov	University Credit Union Pavilion (3,500); Moraga, CA
February 28, 2026; 5:00 p.m., CBSSN		Oregon State	W 93–72	24–7 (15–3)	19 – Knapper	10 – Ensminger	7 – Ensminger	Leavey Center (2,388); Santa Clara, CA
WCC tournament
March 8, 2026; 8:00 p.m., ESPN2	(3)	vs. (6) Pacific; Quarterfinal	W 76–68	25–7	19 – Graves	11 – Mahi	6 – Tied	Orleans Arena (3,664); Paradise, NV
March 9, 2026; 8:30 p.m., ESPN2	(3)	vs. (2) No. 21 Saint Mary's; Semifinal	W 76–71	26–7	23 – Gavalyugov	7 – Tied	6 – Gavalyugov	Orleans Arena (6,343); Paradise, NV
March 10, 2026; 6:00 p.m., ESPN	(3)	vs. (1) No. 12 Gonzaga; Championship	L 68–79	26–8	24 – Hammond	9 – Graves	5 – Gavalyugov	Orleans Arena (6,517); Paradise, NV
NCAA tournament
March 20, 2026*; 9:15 a.m., CBS	(10 MW)	vs. (7 MW) Kentucky; First round	L 84–89 ^{OT}	26–9	20 – Mahi	8 – Ensminger	5 – Gavalyugov	Enterprise Center (17,192); St. Louis, MO
*Non-conference game. ^{#}Rankings from AP Poll. (#) Tournament seedings in parentheses. MW=MW. All times are in Pacific Time.

== Rankings ==
Ranking movements Legend: ██ Increase in ranking ██ Decrease in ranking — = Not ranked RV = Received votes
	Week																				
Poll	Pre	1	2	3	4	5	6	7	8	9	10	11	12	13	14	15	16	17	18	19	Final
AP	—	—	—	RV	—	—	—	—	—	—	—	—	—	RV	RV	—	—	RV	—	RV	—
Coaches	—	—	—	—	—	—	—	—	—	—	—	—	—	—	RV	—	—	—	—	RV	—
