= 2025–26 Seattle Redhawks men's basketball team =

American college basketball season

2025–26 Seattle Redhawks men's basketball

NIT, Second Round
- Conference: West Coast Conference
- Record: 21–14 (8–10 WCC)
- Head coach: Chris Victor (5th season)
- Associate head coach: Grant Leep
- Assistant coaches: D'Marques Tyson; Steven Shpreyrengin; Colin Rardin; Bryce Douglas
- Home arena: Redhawk Center; Climate Pledge Arena

2025–26 West Coast Conference men's basketball standings
	Conf.				Overall
Team	W		L	PCT	W		L	PCT
No. 18 Gonzaga †	16	–	2	.889	31	–	4	.886
Saint Mary's	16	–	2	.889	27	–	6	.818
Santa Clara	15	–	3	.833	26	–	9	.743
Oregon State	9	–	9	.500	17	–	16	.515
San Francisco	8	–	10	.444	17	–	16	.515
Pacific	8	–	10	.444	18	–	15	.545
Seattle	8	–	10	.444	21	–	14	.600
Washington State	7	–	11	.389	12	–	20	.375
Portland	6	–	12	.333	15	–	19	.441
Loyola Marymount	6	–	12	.333	15	–	17	.469
San Diego	5	–	13	.278	12	–	21	.364
Pepperdine	4	–	14	.222	9	–	23	.281
† 2026 WCC tournament winner Rankings from AP poll

The 2025–26 Seattle Redhawks men's basketball team represented Seattle University in the 2025–26 NCAA Division I men's basketball season. The Redhawks, led by fifth-year head coach Chris Victor, played their games on-campus at the Redhawk Center and off-campus at Climate Pledge Arena.

In 2025, Seattle rejoined the West Coast Conference, after its initial membership from 1971 to 1980. They were previously a member of the Western Athletic Conference from 2012 to 2025.

Seattle's 12–3 record to start the 2025–26 season marked the Redhawks' best start since their 1963–64 season. In 2026, Seattle's Will Heimbrodt was named WCC Defensive Player of the Year, after ranking No. 6 nationally in blocked shots (2.53 per game) and ranking No. 1 in conference games in blocked shots (2.4 per game).

== Previous season ==
The Redhawks finished the 2024–25 14–18, 8–8 in WAC play to finish in a tie fourth place. As a No. 5 seed in the WAC tournament, they defeated Abilene Christian in the quarterfinals before losing to Utah Valley in the semifinals. This was the Redhawks' last season as a member of the Western Athletic Conference, as they joined the WCC effective July 1, 2025.

== Offseason ==
=== Departures ===
Name	Number	Pos.	Height	Weight	Year	Hometown	Reason for departure
Paris Dawson	2	G	6'2"	170	Senior	Carson, CA	Graduated
DaSean Stevens	5	G	6'3"	180	Junior	Redlands, CA	Transferred to Cal State Dominguez Hills
Vasja Pandža	7	G	6'8"	218	Senior	Leeds, England	Transferred
Malik Gomma	8	F	6'8"	245	Sophomore	Seattle, WA	Transferred to Weber State
Matthew-Alexander Moncrieffe	12	F	6'8"	214	Graduate Student	Toronto, ON	Graduated
Eric Zheng	19	G	5'10'	167	Freshman	Beijing, China	Walk-on; TBD
Viktor Rajković	21	F	6'6"	225	Senior	Mill Valley, CA	Graduated
Niko Fotopoulos	30	G	6'3"	175	(redshirt) Sophomore	Seattle, WA	Transferred
Kobe Williamson	96	F	6'8"	245	Senior	Melbourne, Australia	Graduated

=== Incoming transfers ===
Name	Number	Pos.	Height	Weight	Year	Hometown	Previous School
Miles Amos	2	G	6'2"	200	Junior	San Francisco, CA	City College of San Francisco
Jojo Murphy	5	G	6'2"	180	Senior	Piedmont, CA	Chico State
Junseok Yeo	21	F	6'8"	218	Senior	Seoul, South Korea	Gonzaga
Brock Felder	33	F	6'8"	256	Junior	Parowan, UT	Southern Utah
Austin Maurer	34	C	7'0"	225	Sophomore	Medford, OR	Grand Canyon

== Recruiting ==
=== 2025 recruiting class ===
College recruiting
Name	Hometown	School	Height	Weight	Commit date
Jamarion Batemon; PG	SeaTac, WA	Anne Wright Schools	6 ft 1 in (1.85 m)	168 lb (76 kg)	Jun 29, 2025
Jamarion Batemon; PG	Recruit ratings: Rivals: 247Sports: ESPN: (NR)				
Stratos Papastavrou; PF	Alimos, Greece	Ypatia Papaxaralampous	6 ft 7 in (2.01 m)	197 lb (89 kg)	Aug 6, 2025
Stratos Papastavrou; PF	Recruit ratings: Rivals: 247Sports: ESPN: (NR)				
Overall recruit ranking:
Note: In many cases, Scout, Rivals, 247Sports, On3, and ESPN may conflict in their listings of height and weight.; In these cases, the average was taken. ESPN grades are on a 100-point scale.; Sources: "2025 Seattle Basketball Commitments". Rivals.; "2025 Team Ranking". Rivals.

=== 2026 recruiting class ===
College recruiting (2026)
Name	Hometown	School	Height	Weight	Commit date
Jaden Bailes; PG	San Diego, CA	JSerra Catholic High School	6 ft 2 in (1.88 m)	N/A	Sep 30, 2025
Jaden Bailes; PG	Recruit ratings: Rivals: 247Sports: ESPN: (NR)				
Overall recruit ranking:
Note: In many cases, Scout, Rivals, 247Sports, On3, and ESPN may conflict in their listings of height and weight.; In these cases, the average was taken. ESPN grades are on a 100-point scale.; Sources: "2025 Seattle Basketball Commitments". Rivals.; "2025 Team Ranking". Rivals.

== Roster ==
2025–26 Seattle Redhawks men's basketball team
Players
Coaches

Pos.	#	Name	Height	Weight	Year	Previous school	Hometown
G	0	Brayden Maldonado	6 ft 0 in (1.83 m)	171 lb (78 kg)	Sr	Smoky Hill HS; MSU Denver	Anchorage, AK
G	1	Maleek Arington	6 ft 3 in (1.91 m)	207 lb (94 kg)	Sr	Auburn HS; Idaho State	Auburn, WA
G	2	Miles Amos	6 ft 2 in (1.88 m)	200 lb (91 kg)	Jr	Stuart Hall HS; CCSF	South San Francisco, CA
G	5	Jojo Murphy	6 ft 2 in (1.88 m)	180 lb (82 kg)	Sr	Piedmont HS; Chico State	Piedmont, CA
C	6	Houran Dan	6 ft 10 in (2.08 m)	230 lb (104 kg)	So	Canyon International Academy (AZ)	Neimenggu, China
G	7	Jeremiah Harshman	6 ft 1 in (1.85 m)	170 lb (77 kg)	Fr	Annie Wright HS	SeaTac, WA
F	9	Stratos Papastavrou	6 ft 7 in (2.01 m)	197 lb (89 kg)	Fr	Ypatia Papaxaralampous	Alimos, Greece
F	10	Ray Adams	6 ft 8 in (2.03 m)	202 lb (92 kg)	RS Fr	North Thurston HS	Olympia, WA
G	11	John Cristofilis	6 ft 3 in (1.91 m)	205 lb (93 kg)	RS Sr	O'Dea HS; Creighton	Seattle, WA
G	14	JT White (W)	6 ft 4 in (1.93 m)	190 lb (86 kg)	Sr	Issaquah HS	Issaquah, WA
F	15	Will Heimbrodt	6 ft 7 in (2.01 m)	220 lb (100 kg)	RS So	Southern California Academy	San Anselmo, CA
F	21	Junseok Yeo	6 ft 8 in (2.03 m)	218 lb (99 kg)	Sr	Korea University; Gonzaga	Seoul, South Korea
F	25	Yuto Kawashima	6 ft 9 in (2.06 m)	215 lb (98 kg)	Fr	Centre of Excellence (Australia)	Gunma, Japan
F	33	Brock Felder	6 ft 8 in (2.03 m)	256 lb (116 kg)	Jr	Parowan HS; Southern Utah	Parowan, UT
C	34	Austin Maurer	7 ft 0 in (2.13 m)	230 lb (104 kg)	So	Cascade Christian HS; Grand Canyon	Medford, OR

Head coach

- Chris Victor (Concordia–Irvine)

Assistant coach(es)

- Grant Leep (Washington)
- D'Marques Tyson (Portland)
- Steven Shpreyregin (Washington State)
- Colin Rardin (Pacific)
- Bryce Douglas (Puget Sound)

Legend

- (C) Team captain
- (S) Suspended
- (I) Ineligible
- (W) Walk-on
- Injured
- Current redshirt

Roster

== Schedule and results ==
Date time, TV	Rank^{#}	Opponent^{#}	Result	Record	High points	High rebounds	High assists	Site (attendance) city, state
Exhibition
October 18, 2025*; 12:00 p.m.		at Utah State	L 76–88		23 – Heimbrodt	6 – Tied	7 – Arington	Smith Spectrum; Logan, UT
Non-conference regular season
November 3, 2025*; 7:00 p.m., ESPN+		Denver	W 84–73	1–0	28 – Maldonado	8 – Tied	4 – Arington	Redhawk Center (957); Seattle, WA
November 8, 2025*; 7:00 p.m., ESPN+		Cal Poly	L 71–73	1–1	20 – Heimbrodt	5 – Tied	4 – Tied	Redhawk Center (999); Seattle, WA
November 12, 2025*; 7:00 p.m., ESPN+		Eastern Washington	W 94−67	2−1	26 – Maldonado	5 – Tied	6 – Arington	Redhawk Center (870); Seattle, WA
November 15, 2025*; 7:00 p.m., ESPN+		Idaho State	W 83–74	3–1	22 – Maldonado	5 – Yeo	9 – Arington	Redhawk Center (875); Seattle, WA
November 21, 2025*; 7:00 p.m., ACCNX/ESPN+		at Stanford	W 77–69	4–1	15 – Yeo	7 – Arington	6 – Arington	Maples Pavilion (2,884); Stanford, CA
November 28, 2025*; 11:00 a.m., FloHoops		vs. Texas State; Resorts World Classic semifinals	W 66–52	5–1	17 – Heimbrodt	7 – Maurer	4 – Tied	Resorts World Arena; Paradise, NV
November 29, 2025*; 1:30 p.m., FloHoops		vs. UC Santa Barbara; Resorts World Classic championship	L 71–74	5–2	20 – Heimbrodt	6 – Yeo	5 – Arington	Resorts World Arena; Paradise, NV
December 3, 2025*; 7:00 p.m., ESPN+		Puget Sound	W 97–43	6–2	18 – Murphy	10 – Adams	3 – Tied	Redhawk Center (664); Seattle, WA
December 7, 2025*; 5:00 p.m., ESPN+		UTEP	W 75–68	7–2	28 – Maldonado	8 – Maurer	5 – Arington	Climate Pledge Arena (1,253); Seattle, WA
December 13, 2025*; 5:00 p.m., ESPN+		Warner Pacific	W 115–60	8–2	20 – Christofilis	10 – Felder	8 – Murphy	Redhawk Center (704); Seattle, WA
December 17, 2025*; 6:00 p.m., ESPN+		at UC Davis	W 79–78	9–2	20 – Heimbrodt	9 – Tied	6 – Arrington	University Credit Union Center (961); Davis, CA
December 19, 2025*; 8:30 p.m., ESPN2		Washington; Rivalry	W 70–66	10–2	19 – Maurer	6 – Tied	5 – Arington	Climate Pledge Arena (4,299); Seattle, WA
December 22, 2025*; 12:00 p.m., ESPN+		at UTSA	W 71–68	11–2	15 – Maldonado	7 – Tied	6 – Arington	Convocation Center (933); San Antonio, TX
WCC regular season
December 28, 2025; 5:00 p.m., ESPN+		San Francisco	L 59–67	11–3 (0–1)	14 – Tied	10 – Heimbrodt	3 – Maldonado	Redhawk Center (999); Seattle, WA
December 30, 2025; 7:00 p.m., ESPN+		Washington State	W 69–55	12–3 (1–1)	15 – Maldonado	6 – Maurer	3 – Tied	Climate Pledge Arena (4,386); Seattle, WA
January 2, 2026; 6:00 p.m., ESPN+		at No. 7 Gonzaga	L 72–80 ^{OT}	12–4 (1–2)	17 – Maldonado	12 – Heimbrodt	5 – Maldonado	McCarthey Athletic Center (6,000); Spokane, WA
January 4, 2026; 5:00 p.m., ESPN+		at Saint Mary's	L 76–93	12–5 (1–3)	24 – Yeo	6 – Arington	6 – Maldonado	University Credit Union Pavilion (3,410); Moraga, CA
January 8, 2026; 7:00 p.m., ESPN+		at Oregon State	L 55–68	12–6 (1–4)	13 – Maldonado	7 – Maurer	5 – Arington	Gill Coliseum (3,273); Corvallis, OR
January 15, 2026; 7:00 p.m., ESPN+		San Diego	W 75–64	13–6 (2–4)	18 – Yeo	7 – Maurer	5 – Arrington	Redhawk Center (978); Seattle, WA
January 17, 2026; 7:00 p.m., ESPN+		No. 9 Gonzaga	L 50–71	13–7 (2–5)	12 – Maldonado	6 – Heimbrodt	3 – Maldonado	Climate Pledge Arena (7,830); Seattle, WA
January 21, 2026; 7:00 p.m., ESPN+		Loyola Marymount	W 69–59	14–7 (3–5)	14 – Maldonado	7 – Heimbrodt	3 – Yeo	Redhawk Center (819); Seattle, WA
January 24, 2026; 4:00 p.m., ESPN+		at Pacific	L 54–56	14–8 (3–6)	20 – Maldonado	6 – Maurer	6 – Arington	Alex G. Spanos Center (1,589); Stockton, CA
January 28, 2026; 6:30 p.m., ESPN+		at Washington State	L 58–70	14–9 (3–7)	12 – Maldonado	7 – Heimbrodt	3 – Maldonado	Beasley Coliseum (3,061); Pullman, WA
February 4, 2026; 7:00 p.m., ESPN+		Pepperdine	W 83–81	15–9 (4–7)	18 – Yeo	6 – Maurer	8 – Arington	Redhawk Center (999); Seattle, WA
February 7, 2026; 5:00 p.m., ESPN+		at Portland	L 53–54	15–10 (4–8)	14 – Yeo	5 – Maldonado	4 – Maldonado	Chiles Center (2,059); Portland, OR
February 11, 2026; 7:00 p.m., ESPN+		at Santa Clara	L 72–84	15–11 (4–9)	17 – Tied	12 – Yeo	5 – Tied	Leavey Center (1,847); Santa Clara, CA
February 15, 2026; 5:00 p.m., ESPN+		Oregon State	W 60–50	16–11 (5–9)	16 – Christofilis	9 – Heimbrodt	3 – Tied	Redhawk Center (999); Seattle, WA
February 18, 2026; 6:00 p.m., CBSSN		Saint Mary's	L 70–72	16–12 (5–10)	20 – Yeo	5 – Tied	2 – Tied	Climate Pledge Arena (2,507); Seattle, WA
February 21, 2026; 7:00 p.m., ESPN+		Portland	W 71–59	17–12 (6–10)	14 – Tied	8 – Heimbrodt	6 – Arington	Redhawk Center (999); Seattle, WA
February 25, 2026; 6:00 p.m., ESPN+		at Pepperdine	W 87–80	19–12 (7–10)	24 – Heimbrodt	7 – Maurer	6 – Murphy	Firestone Fieldhouse (571); Malibu, CA
February 28, 2026; 6:00 p.m., ESPN+		at Loyola Marymount	W 71–66	19–12 (8–10)	31 – Maldonado	4 – Tied	4 – Maldonado	Gersten Pavilion (1,192); Los Angeles, CA
WCC Tournament
March 6, 2026; 8:30 p.m., ESPN+	(7)	vs. (11) San Diego; Second Round	W 58–56	20–12	16 – Heimbrodt	9 – Heimbrodt	5 – Murphy	Orleans Arena (2,222); Paradise, NV
March 7, 2026; 8:30 p.m., ESPN+	(7)	vs. (6) Pacific; Third Round	L 58–61	20–13	16 – Yeo	8 – Maurer	4 – Tied	Orleans Arena (2,757); Paradise, NV
National Invitational Tournament
March 17, 2026*; 7:00 pm, ESPN+	(4 AU)	St. Thomas (MN); First round	W 67–52	21–13	15 – Maldonado	9 – Arington	5 – Maldonado	Redhawk Center (686); Seattle, WA
March 22, 2026*; 3:30 pm, ESPN2	(4 AU)	at (1 AU) Auburn; Second Round	L 85–91	21–14	25 – Maldonado	6 – Yeo	5 – Maldonado	Neville Arena (3,672); Auburn, AL
*Non-conference game. ^{#}Rankings from AP poll. (#) Tournament seedings in parentheses. AU=Auburn. All times are in Pacific Standard Time.
