= Yeo Jun-seok =

South Korean basketball player (born 2002)

Yeo Jun-seok 여준석
No. 21 – Seattle Redhawks
- Position: Small forward
- Conference: West Coast Conference

Personal information
- Born: March 19, 2002 (age 24) Seoul, South Korea
- Listed height: 6 ft 8 in (2.03 m)
- Listed weight: 218 lb (99 kg)

Career information
- High school: Yongsan (Seoul, South Korea)
- College: Korea (2022–2023); Gonzaga (2023–2025); Seattle (2025–present)

Career highlights
- 25-26 All-WCC Honorable Mention

Yeo Jun-seok (Korean: 여준석; born March 19, 2002) is a South Korean college basketball player for the Seattle Redhawks of the West Coast Conference (WCC). He previously played for the Korea Tigers and Gonzaga Bulldogs. Yeo also plays for the South Korea men's national basketball team, where he helped the team qualify for the FIBA Asia Cup in 2021.

== Early life ==
Originally from Seoul, South Korea, Yeo started playing basketball when he was 11 years old. Yeo has an older brother; his father, standing at six feet and five inches, played basketball when he was younger. His mother stands at five feet 11 inches. He started playing due to his older brother. He also ran track and played soccer. When Yeo turned 13 years old, he began to take basketball seriously. Yeo's favorite basketball player is Kawhi Leonard, according to Yeo, he said, “I like the way he plays. He's really good at defense.”

== High school career ==
For high school, Yeo attended Yongsan High School, where he led his team to a national title. Then, in his senior year of high school, Yeo was selected to participate in the NBA Global Academy in Australia.

== College career ==
=== Gonzaga Bulldogs (2023–2025) ===
In 2022, Yeo joined Korea University, where he would play basketball with them until the spring of 2023, when he would then transfer to Gonzaga for the rest of the season. He later became the third Men’s Division 1 basketball player ever from South Korea, after Choi Jin-Soo and Lee Hyun-jung (basketball) After transferring, Yeo wouldn't play for the remainder of the 2022-23 season. Entering the 2023-24 season, Yeo made his debut after practicing with the team for the second half of the 2022–23 season. On December 5, 2023, Yeo made his first career start with the Bulldogs, where he would log in ten points and four rebounds in an 111–71 victory against the Pine-Bluff Golden Lions. Throughout the regular season, he appeared in 25 games during his first active season, averaging 2.3 points.

Entering the 2024-25 season, Yeo was showing exceptional flashes early on. He played in all 13 non-conference games, he appeared in 10 of Gonzaga's 16 league games, and averaged 6.0 minutes in those outings, but his minutes on the court began to stagger after he didn't play in either of the team's two WCC Tournament games. According to Dan Dickau, he stated how "Yeo wasn't taking advantage of his minutes", despite having the tools. Following his dwindle in minutes, Yeo only appeared in 14 games for the Bulldogs, averaging only 1.6 points per game in 4.1 minutes of game action.

Following the 2024–25 season with the Bulldogs, Yeo entered the NCAA transfer portal.

=== Seattle Redhawks (2025–present) ===
For the 2025-26 season, Yeo decided to join the Seattle Redhawks for the season, where he would hope to find an increase in minutes. On January 4, 2026, Yeo scored a career high 24 points on a 6-8 shooting from three with two assists, two steals, and a block in a 76–93 loss against the Saint Mary Gaels.

== National team career ==
Yeo represents the South Korea men's national basketball team. He also represented South Korea in the 2021 FIBA Under-19 Basketball World Cup in Latvia. Yeo averaged a tournament-high double-double of 25.6 points per game while grabbing 10.6 rebounds per game. He also represented South Korea in the 2018 FIBA U18 Asian Championship and averaged 16.2 points, 6.2 rebounds, 1.2 steals, and 1.8 blocks despite being two years younger than the rest of the competition. At the 2026 Asian Games, Yeo represented South Korea and won a gold medal with the team despite not playing due to a foot injury.
