= Emmanuel Ugbo =

Nigerian-Dutch basketball player (born 2003)

No. 1 – Paderborn Baskets
- Position: Power forward
- League: ProA

Personal information
- Born: 14 April 2003 (age 23) Barendrecht, Netherlands
- Listed height: 6 ft 8 in (2.03 m)
- Listed weight: 245 lb (111 kg)

Career information
- College: Boise State (2023–2025); Washington State (2025–2026)
- Playing career: 2017–2023

Career history
- 2017–2018: CBV Binnenland
- 2018–2020: BC Triple Threat
- 2020–2021: Orange Lions Academy
- 2021–2023: Riesen Ludwigsburg
- 2026–present: Paderborn Baskets

Emmanuel Ikechukwu Ugbo (born 14 April 2003) is a Nigerian-Dutch professional basketball player for Paderborn Baskets of the German ProA. He previously played for the Boise State Broncos.

== Early life and career ==
Born in Italy to Nigerian parents, Ugbo started playing basketball at age 14 with local club CBV Binnenland, after previously playing soccer. After a year, he switched to play for BC Triple Threat in Haarlem. After two seasons, Ugbo moved to Amsterdam to play for the Orange Lions Academy, a program affiliated with Basketball Nederland.

After a try-out with Riesen Ludwigsburg he moved to Germany to play for the club's Under-19 team. After his first season in Ludwigsburg, in September 2021 he won the Most Improved Player of the year award from Porsche (The sponsor of the youth program named Porsche BBA) after this season where he played on the Under-19 team, second men's team in the Regionalliga and getting multiple opportunities to play with Riesen Ludwigsburg in their respective competitions, in July 2022 Ugbo also played in the NBA Academy Games Atlanta on an invitational team.

== Professional career ==
On 5 October 2021, Ugbo made his debut for Riesen Ludwigsburg in the Basketball Championsleague, playing one minute against Dinamo Basket Sassari

On 16 October 2021, Ugbo made his debut for Riesen Ludwigsburg in the Basketball Bundesliga, playing one minute against Göttingen.

On August 6, 2026, he signed with Paderborn Baskets of the German ProA.

== National team career ==
In 2022, Ugbo was selected to represent the Netherlands at the youth level for the 2022 FIBA U20 European Championship Division B. The following year, Ugbo was also a member of the U20 national team at the 2023 tournament.
