= 2024–25 Kansas City Roos men's basketball team =

American college basketball season

2024–25 Kansas City Roos men's basketball
- Conference: Summit League
- Record: 13–20 (4–12 Summit)
- Head coach: Marvin Menzies (3rd season)
- Associate head coach: Joe Esposito (3rd season)
- Assistant coaches: Michael Bowden (3rd season); Zeb Kujolic (2nd season); Anthony Richardson (2nd season); Jake Kates (1st season)
- Home arena: Swinney Recreation Center

2024–25 Summit League men's basketball standings
	Conf.				Overall
Team	W		L	PCT	W		L	PCT
Omaha †	13	–	3	.813	22	–	13	.629
St. Thomas *	12	–	4	.750	24	–	10	.706
South Dakota State	11	–	5	.688	20	–	12	.625
North Dakota State	10	–	6	.625	21	–	11	.656
South Dakota	9	–	7	.563	19	–	14	.576
North Dakota	5	–	11	.313	12	–	21	.364
Denver	5	–	11	.313	11	–	21	.344
Kansas City	4	–	12	.250	13	–	20	.394
Oral Roberts	3	–	13	.188	7	–	23	.233
† 2025 Summit League tournament winner * Ineligible for the 2025 NCAA tournament due to transition from Division III

The 2024–25 Kansas City Roos men's basketball team represented the University of Missouri–Kansas City during the 2024–25 NCAA Division I men's basketball season. The Roos, led by third-year head coach Marvin Menzies, played their home games on-campus at Swinney Recreation Center in Kansas City, Missouri as a member of the Summit League.

The Roos finished the season 13–20 overall, 4–12 in the Summit League to finish in eight place. As the eighth seed, they were victorious over Oral Roberts University in the first round but defeated by the University of Nebraska Omaha in the quarterfinal round of the Summit League tournament.

== Previous season ==
The Roos finished the 2023–24 season with a record of 16–16 overall, 10–6 in the Summit League to finish in a tie for second place. As the second seed, they were defeated by Denver in the quarterfinal round of the Summit League tournament.

== Roster ==
2024–25 Kansas City Roos men's basketball team
Players
Coaches

Pos.	#	Name	Height	Weight	Year	Previous school	Hometown
G	2	Babacar Diallo	6 ft 6 in (1.98 m)	197 lb (89 kg)	GS	Navarro/ Saint Peter's; The Patrick	Dakar, Senegal
G	11	Anderson Kopp	6 ft 6 in (1.98 m)	190 lb (86 kg)	GS	Lamar; St. Thomas HS	Houston, TX
G/F	5	Jamar Brown	6 ft 5 in (1.96 m)	205 lb (93 kg)	Sr	Phoenix; Hamilton HS	Chandler, AZ
F/C	20	Melvyn Ebonkoli	6 ft 8 in (2.03 m)	235 lb (107 kg)	Sr	Independence CC/ Missouri State; Putnam Science Academy/ Polyvalent Le Mans Sud	Trappes, France
G/F	30	Cameron Faas	6 ft 7 in (2.01 m)	217 lb (98 kg)	Sr	Scottsdale CC; Arcadia HS	Scottsdale, AZ
G	0	Gob Gob	6 ft 3 in (1.91 m)	189 lb (86 kg)	Jr	Hill College; Minnesota Prep/ Manchester HS West	Manchester, NH
G	7	Kasheem Grady II	6 ft 5 in (1.96 m)	185 lb (84 kg)	Jr	Howard/ Florida State–Manatee–Sarasota; Mount Pisgah Christian	Atlanta, GA
G	3	Davontae Hall	6 ft 0 in (1.83 m)	168 lb (76 kg)	Jr	Indian Hills CC; Hyde Park HS	Chicago, IL
F	21	Josh Ijeh	6 ft 9 in (2.06 m)	205 lb (93 kg)	Jr	Casper/ Florida State–Manatee–Sarasota/ James Watt; The Milton Keynes	Milton Keynes, England
G	40	Zack Markus	6 ft 0 in (1.83 m)	185 lb (84 kg)	Jr	Arizona State/ Tusculum; Wilson Central HS	Mount Juliet, TN
G	1	Jayson Petty	6 ft 4 in (1.93 m)	190 lb (86 kg)	So	Phoenix College Preparatory	Phoenix, AZ
F	8	David Oyona Ibandzo	6 ft 9 in (2.06 m)	238 lb (108 kg)	RS Fr	UTRGV; Keystone Athletic/ Mercyhurst Preparatory/ Sunrise Christian	Pointe–Noire, Congo
F	44	Blake Ammons	6 ft 10 in (2.08 m)	210 lb (95 kg)	Fr	Phhoenix Prep/ Harmony Grove HS	Bryant, AR
F	35	Teysean Eaglestaff	6 ft 7 in (2.01 m)	188 lb (85 kg)	Fr	Bismarck HS	Eagle Butte, SD
F	12	Ring Nyeri	6 ft 8 in (2.03 m)	165 lb (75 kg)	Fr	Liberty HS	Peoria, AZ

Head coach

- Marvin Menzies (UCLA)

Assistant coach(es)

- Joe Esposito (Marist)
- Michael Bowden (Florida)
- Zev Kujolic (Hamline (Minnesota))
- Anthony Richardson (Florida State)
- Jake Kates (Pensacola Christian)

Legend

- (C) Team captain
- (S) Suspended
- (I) Ineligible
- (W) Walk-on
- (5Y) Fifth-year Senior
- Injured
- Current redshirt

Roster
Last update: November 3, 2025

== Schedule & Results ==
Date time, TV	Rank^{#}	Opponent^{#}	Result	Record	High points	High rebounds	High assists	Site (attendance) city, state
Non–conference regular season
November 4, 2024*; 6:00 PM, SLN		Hannibal–LaGrange	W 91–68	1–0	26 – Brown	9 – Brown	8 – Hall	Swinney Recreation Center (650); Kansas City, MO
November 8, 2024*; 7:00 PM, SLN		Kansas Christian	W 124–36	2–0	22 – Kopp	13 – Ebonkoli	9 – Hall	Swinney Recreation Center (791); Kansas City, MO
November 11, 2024*; 7:00 PM, ESPN+		at No. 7 Iowa State	L 56–82	2–1	20 – Brown	8 – Petty	4 – Hall	Hilton Coliseum (13,464); Ames, IA
November 16, 2024*; 6:00 PM, FS2		at No. 14 Creighton	L 56–79	2–2	12 – Tied	16 – Brown	4 – Kopp	CHI Health Center Omaha (16,951); Omaha, NE
November 18, 2024*; 7:00 PM, SLN		Calvary	W 119–19	3–2	22 – Brown	9 – Ebonkoli	9 – Grady II	Swinney Recreation Center (620); Kansas City, MO
November 22, 2024*; 3:30 PM		vs. American; Puerto Rico Clasico [Round–Robin]	L 60–64	3–3	14 – Grady II	5 – Tied	3 – Kopp	Coliseo Rubén Rodríguez (50); San Juan, Puerto Rico
November 23, 2024*; 12:00 PM		vs. Albany; Puerto Rico Clasico [Round–Robin]	L 65–67	3–4	20 – Kopp	8 – Ebonkoli	4 – Tied	Coliseo Rubén Rodríguez (100); San Juan, Puerto Rico
November 24, 2024*; 2:30 PM		at Puerto Rico–Rio Piedras; Puerto Rico Clasico [Round–Robin]	W 88–55	4–4	18 – Tied	6 – Diallo	5 – Tied	Coliseo Rubén Rodríguez (100); San Juan, Puerto Rico
November 30, 2024*; 7:00 PM, ESPN+		at Southeast Missouri State	L 59–80	4–5	27 – Kopp	7 – Nyeri	3 – Hall	Show Me Center (890); Cape Girardeau, MO
December 4, 2024*; 7:00 PM, SLN		Idaho; Big Sky–Summit Challenge	L 77–82	4–6	22 – Kopp	8 – Petty	4 – Hall	Swinney Recreation Center (792); Kansas City, MO
December 7, 2024*; 7:00 PM, ESPN+		at Montana State; Big Sky–Summit Challenge	L 62–74	4–7	18 – Hall	6 – Petty	5 – Diallo	Brick Breeden Fieldhouse (2,599); Bozeman, MT
December 10, 2024*; 9:00 PM, ESPN+		at Portland	W 69–64	5–7	20 – Brown	5 – Grady II	8 – Diallo	Earle A. & Virginia H. Chiles Center (781); Portland, OR
December 14, 2024*; 7:00 PM, SLN		Bowling Green	W 85–77	6–7	18 – Brown	6 – Tied	6 – Diallo	Swinney Recreation Center (725); Kansas City, MO
December 17, 2024*; 7:00 PM, ESPN+		at Wichita State	W 74–64	7–7	18 – Diallo	9 – Petty	6 – Brown	Charles Koch Arena (5,722); Wichita, KS
December 21, 2024*; 1:00 PM, SLN		East Tennessee State	W 73–66	8–7	22 – Brown	8 – Brown	5 – Diallo	Swinney Recreation Center (699); Kansas City, MO
Summit League regular season
January 2, 2025; 7:00 PM, Midco Sports Two/SLN		South Dakota	W 68–54	9–7 (1–0)	19 – Brown	11 – Brown	4 – Diallo	Swinney Recreation Center (872); Kansas City, MO
January 4, 2025; 5:00 PM, KMCI–TV/SLN		Oral Roberts	W 90–67	10–7 (2–0)	16 – Brown	11 – Brown	4 – Diallo	Swinney Recreation Center (614); Kansas City, MO
January 8, 2025; 8:00 PM, CBSSN		at Omaha	L 58–77	10–8 (2–1)	15 – Diallo	5 – Brown	3 – Diallo	Baxter Arena (2,437); Omaha, NE
January 16, 2025; 7:00 PM, SLN		at North Dakota State	L 64–71	10–9 (2–2)	19 – Petty	8 – Petty	7 – Hall	Scheels Center (1,544); Fargo, ND
January 18, 2025; 7:00 PM, Midco Sports/SLN		at North Dakota	L 72–76	10–10 (2–3)	20 – Faas	11 – Brown	2 – Tied	Betty Engelstad Sioux Center (1,994); Grand Forks, ND
January 23, 2025; 7:00 PM, KMCI–TV/SLN		South Dakota State	L 64–65	10–11 (2–4)	19 – Kopp	9 – Brown	2 – Tied	Swinney Recreation Center (1,116); Kansas City, MO
January 25, 2025; 7:00 PM, KMCI–TV/SLN		St. Thomas	L 65–68	10–12 (2–5)	21 – Diallo	7 – Ebonkoli	3 – Diallo	Swinney Recreation Center (1,534); Kansas City, MO
January 30, 2025; 8:00 PM, SLN		at Denver	L 68–69	10–13 (2–6)	15 – Brown	5 – Tied	3 – Tied	Hamilton Gymnasium (1,014); Denver, CO
February 1, 2025; 7:00 PM, SLN		at Oral Roberts	L 67–73	10–14 (2–7)	17 – Brown	9 – Brown	8 – Diallo	Mabee Center (4,035); Tulsa, OK
February 6, 2025; 7:00 PM, KMCI–TV/SLN		North Dakota State	L 72–78	10–15 (2–8)	26 – Brown	12 – Brown	3 – Brown	Swinney Recreation Center (986); Kansas City, MO
February 8, 2025; 7:00 PM, KMCI–TV/SLN		North Dakota	W 80–69	11–15 (3–8)	29 – Brown	5 – Tied	7 – Diallo	Swinney Recreation Center (1,058); Kansas City, MO
February 13, 2025; 7:00 PM, Midco Sports Two/SLN		at South Dakota	L 72–79	11–16 (3–9)	21 – Petty	13 – Brown	3 – Faas	Sanford Coyote Sports Center (1,829); Vermillion, SD
February 19, 2025; 7:00 PM, SLN		Omaha	L 66–78	11–17 (3–10)	17 – Brown	6 – Faas	3 – Diallo	Swinney Recreation Center (1,010); Kansas City, MO
February 23, 2025; 1:00 PM, CBSSN		at South Dakota State	L 65–70	11–18 (3–11)	21 – Brown	9 – Brown	7 – Diallo	First Bank & Trust Arena (3,425); Brookings, SD
February 27, 2025; 7:00 PM, KMCI–TV/SLN		Denver	W 64–56	12–18 (4–11)	25 – Brown	11 – Brown	4 – Diallo	Swinney Recreation Center (1,034); Kansas City, MO
March 1, 2025; 7:00 PM, SLN		at St. Thomas	L 59–65	12–19 (4–12)	17 – Brown	15 – Ebonkoli	4 – Diallo	Schoenecker Arena (1,783); St. Paul, MN
Summit League tournament
March 5, 2025*; 7:00 PM, Midco Sports/SLN	(8)	vs. (9) Oral Roberts; First Round	W 73–56	13–19	24 – Brown	8 – Ebonkoli	9 – Diallo	Denny Sanford Premier Center (3,917); Sioux Falls, SD
March 6, 2025*; 6:00 PM, Midco Sports/SLN	(8)	vs. (1) Omaha; Quarterfinal	L 61–70	13–20	27 – Brown	8 – Faas	8 – Diallo	Denny Sanford Premier Center (5,814); Sioux Falls, SD
*Non-conference game. ^{#}Rankings from AP Poll. (#) Tournament seedings in parentheses. All times are in Central Standard Time (CST).
