= 2023–24 Summit League men's basketball season =

College men's basketball season

- League: NCAA Division I
- Sport: Basketball
- Teams: 9

Regular season
- Regular season champion: South Dakota State
- Season MVP: Zeke Mayo, South Dakota State

Summit League tournament
- Champions: South Dakota State
- Runners-up: Denver
- Finals MVP: William Kyle III, South Dakota State

Seasons
- ← 2022–23 2024–25 →

2023–24 Summit League men's basketball standings
	Conf.				Overall
Team	W		L	PCT	W		L	PCT
South Dakota State †	12	–	4	.750	22	–	13	.629
Kansas City	10	–	6	.625	16	–	16	.500
North Dakota	10	–	6	.625	18	–	14	.563
St. Thomas *	9	–	7	.563	20	–	13	.606
North Dakota State	8	–	8	.500	15	–	17	.469
Omaha	7	–	9	.438	15	–	18	.455
Denver	6	–	10	.375	17	–	17	.500
Oral Roberts	5	–	11	.313	12	–	19	.387
South Dakota	5	–	11	.313	12	–	20	.375
† 2024 Summit League tournament winner * Ineligible for the 2024 NCAA tournament due to transition from Division III

The 2023–24 Summit League men's basketball season started non-conference play on November 6, 2023, and began conference play on December 29, 2023. The regular season ended on March 2, 2024, and set up the 2024 Summit League men's basketball tournament from March 8 to March 12, 2024.
South Dakota State finished league play with a 12–4 record as the regular season champion. In the postseason, after winning the Summit League tournament, South Dakota State was slotted as a 15 seed in the 2024 NCAA Division I men's basketball tournament. They lost to Iowa State in the first round.

== Conference Changes ==
Following the end of the 2023 Spring sports regular season, Western Illinois announced they would be leaving the Summit League effective July 1, 2023 for the Ohio Valley Conference in all sports except men's soccer.

== Head coaches ==
=== Coaching changes ===
==== Oral Roberts ====
On March 23, 2023, sixth-year coach Paul Mills left Oral Roberts for the head coaching job at Wichita State. Then, on March 24, 2023, Russell Springmann was announced as the next head coach for the Golden Eagles. Springmann was previously an assistant at Oral Roberts under Mills.

=== Coaches ===
Team	Head Coach	Previous Job	Years At School	Record at School	Summit League Record	Summit League Titles	NCAA tournaments	NCAA Sweet 16's
Denver	Jeff Wulbrun	Stanford (Assistant)	3	26–38	13–23	0	0	0
Kansas City	Marvin Menzies	Grand Canyon (Associate HC)	2	11–21	7–1	0	5	0
North Dakota	Paul Sather	Northern State	5	43–80	23–45	0	0	0
North Dakota State	David Richman	North Dakota State (Assistant)	10	172–114	89–54	3	2	0
Omaha	Chris Crutchfield	Oregon (Assistant)	2	8–22	4–14	0	0	0
Oral Roberts	Russell Springmann	Oral Roberts (Assistant)	1	0–0	0–0	0	0	0
St. Thomas	John Tauer	St. Thomas (Assistant)	12	246–87^	13–23	0	0^^	0^^^
South Dakota	Eric Peterson	Utah (Assistant)	2	12–18	7–11	0	0	0
South Dakota State	Eric Henderson	South Dakota State (Assistant)	5	87–35	53–11	1	1	0

Notes:

- Year at school includes 2023–24 season.
- Overall and Summit League records are from the time at their current school and are through the end of the 2022–23.
- NCAA tournament appearances are from the time at current school only.

^218 wins and 50 losses at the Division III level

^^8 NCAA Division III Tournaments

^^^4 NCAA Division III Sweet 16s, 2 NCAA Division III Final Fours, and 1 NCAA Division III National Championship

== Preseason awards ==
The preseason Summit League men's basketball polls were released on October 10, 2023.

=== Preseason poll ===
First place votes in parentheses

1. South Dakota State (27) – 600
2. Oral Roberts (7) – 510
3. North Dakota State (2) – 482
4. St. Thomas – 386
5. North Dakota – 374
6. South Dakota – 274
7. Omaha – 252
8. Kansas City – 201
9. Denver – 161

=== Preseason honors ===
Honor	Recipient
Preseason Player of the Year	Zeke Mayo, South Dakota State
Preseason All-Summit League First Team	Luke Appel, South Dakota State
Preseason All-Summit League First Team	Parker Bjorklund, St. Thomas
Preseason All-Summit League First Team	Frankie Fidler, Omaha
Preseason All-Summit League First Team	Zeke Mayo, South Dakota State
Preseason All-Summit League First Team	Isaac McBride, Oral Roberts
Preseason All-Summit League First Team	Boden Skunberg, North Dakota State
Preseason All-Summit League Second Team	Tommy Bruner, Denver
Preseason All-Summit League Second Team	William Kyle III, South Dakota State
Preseason All-Summit League Second Team	Andrew Morgan, North Dakota State
Preseason All-Summit League Second Team	B.J. Omot, North Dakota
Preseason All-Summit League Second Team	Kareem Thompson, Oral Roberts

== Regular season ==
=== Conference standings ===
Current as of March 30, 2024

		Conference		Overall		
Rank	Team	Record	Percent	Record	Percent	Tiebreaker
1	South Dakota State	12–4	.750	22–13	.629	
2	Kansas City	10–6	.625	16–16	.500	1–1 vs. South Dakota State
3	North Dakota	10–6	.625	18–14	.562	0–2 vs. South Dakota State
4	St. Thomas	9–7	.563	20–13	.606	
5	North Dakota State	8–8	.500	15–17	.469	
6	Omaha	7–9	.438	15–18	.455	
7	Denver	6–10	.375	17–17	.500	
8	Oral Roberts	5–11	.313	12–19	.387	1–1 vs. South Dakota State
9	South Dakota	5–11	.313	12–20	.375	0–2 vs. South Dakota State

=== Conference Matrix ===
	Denver	Kansas City	North Dakota	North Dakota State	Omaha	Oral Roberts	St. Thomas	South Dakota	South Dakota State
vs. Denver	–	2–0	2–0	0–2	1–1	2–0	1–1	1–1	1–1
vs. Kansas City	0–2	–	1–1	2–0	0–2	0–2	2–0	0–2	1–1
vs. North Dakota	0–2	1–1	–	1–1	1–1	0–2	1–1	0–2	2–0
vs. North Dakota State	2–0	0–2	1–1	–	1–1	0–2	1–1	2–0	1–1
vs. Omaha	1–1	2–0	1–1	1–1	–	1–1	1–1	0–2	2–0
vs. Oral Roberts	0–2	2–0	2–0	2–0	1–1	–	2–0	1–1	1–1
vs. St. Thomas	1–1	0–2	1–1	1–1	1–1	0–2	–	1–1	2–0
vs. South Dakota	1–1	2–0	2–0	0–2	2–0	1–1	1–1	–	2–0
vs. South Dakota State	1–1	1–1	0–2	1–1	0–2	1–1	0–2	0–2	–
Total	6–10	10–6	10–6	8–8	7–9	5–11	9–7	5–11	12–4

Through March 3, 2024

=== Players of the Week ===
Week	Player(s) of the Week	School
Nov. 13	Tommy Bruner	Denver
Nov. 20	Isaac McBride	Oral Roberts
Nov. 27	Treysen Eaglestaff	North Dakota
Dec. 4	Isaac McBride (2)	Oral Roberts (2)
Dec. 11	Tommy Bruner (2)	Denver (2)
Dec. 18	Treysen Eaglestaff (2)	North Dakota (2)
Dec. 27	B.J. Omot	North Dakota (3)
Jan. 2	Tommy Bruner (3)	Denver (3)
Jan. 2	Frankie Fidler	Omaha
Jan. 8	Tommy Bruner (4)	Denver (4)
Jan. 15	Frankie Fidler (2)	Omaha (2)
Jan. 22	Zeke Mayo	South Dakota State
Jan. 29	Tommy Bruner (5)	Denver (5)
Jan. 29	Isaac McBride (3)	Oral Roberts (3)
Feb. 5	Amar Kuljuhovic	North Dakota (4)
Feb. 12	Andrew Morgan	North Dakota State
Feb. 19	Treysen Eaglestaff (3)	North Dakota (5)
Feb. 26	Jamar Brown	Kansas City
Mar. 4	Zeke Mayo (2)	South Dakota State (2)

=== Records against other conferences ===
As of January 6, 2024:

Major 7 Conferences	Record	Major 7 Conferences	Record
ACC	None	American	2–2
Big East	0–3	Big Ten	0–2
Big 12	0–9	Pac-12	0–1
SEC	0–1	Major 7 Total	2–19
Other Division I Conferences	Record	Other Division I Conferences	Record
Atlantic 10	0–1	ASUN	1–0
America East	None	Big Sky	11–12
Big South	None	Big West	2–7
CAA	3–0	Conference USA	0–1
Horizon League	1–2	Ivy League	0–1
Independents	1–0	MAAC	None
MAC	4–2	MEAC	0–1
MVC	0–3	MWC	1–6
NEC	None	OVC	3–2
Patriot League	None	SoCon	1–2
Southland	3–1	SWAC	1–0
Sun Belt	1–1	WAC	2–3
WCC	2–2		
Other Division I Total			37–47
NCAA Division I Total			39–66
NCAA Division II Total			4–0
NCAA Division III Total			6–0
NAIA Total			15–0
NCCAA Total			4–0
Total Non-Conference Record			68–66

=== Record against ranked non-conference opponents ===
Summit League record against ranked teams (rankings from AP Poll): Summit League teams in Bold

Date	Visitor	Home	Site	Score	Conference record	Reference
November 11	North Dakota State	No. 8 Creighton	CHI Health Center Omaha; Omaha, NE	**L 60**–89	0–1	
November 14	Kansas City	No. 15 Baylor	Ferrell Center; Waco, TX	**L 61**–99	0–2	
November 17	Oral Roberts	No. 13 Texas A&M	Reed Arena; College Station, TX	**L 66**–74	0–3	
December 5	Kansas City	No. 2 Kansas	Allen Fieldhouse; Lawrence, KS	**L 69**–88	0–4	
December 6	Denver	No. 13 Colorado State	Moby Arena; Fort Collins, CO	**L 80**–90	0–4	
December 13	Denver	No. 18 BYU	Marriott Center; Provo, UT	**L 74**–90	0–5	
December 14	St. Thomas	No. 7 Marquette	Fiserv Forum; Milwaukee, WI	**L 79**–84	0–6	

=== Points Scored ===
Team	For	Against	Difference
Denver	2755	2737	+18
Kansas City	2300	2217	+83
North Dakota	2408	2300	+108
North Dakota State	2388	2366	+22
Omaha	2441	2404	+37
Oral Roberts	2275	2334	–59
St. Thomas	2402	2140	+262
South Dakota	2434	2535	–101
South Dakota State	2675	2490	+185

Through March 30, 2024

=== Home attendance ===
Team	Arena	Capacity	Total Games	Average Attendance	Attendance High	Total Attendance	% of Capacity
Denver	Hamilton Gymnasium	2,500	14	894	1,278; Jan 25 vs. South Dakota	12,521	35.8%
Kansas City	Swinney Recreation Center	1,500	13	1,130	**1,507**; Feb 15 vs. South Dakota St	14,690	75.3%
North Dakota	Betty Engelstad Sioux Center	3,300	14	1,704	3,065; Feb 3 vs. North Dakota St	23,860	51.6%
North Dakota State	Scheels Center	5,460	14	1,935	5,058; Feb 24 vs. North Dakota	27,103	35.5%
Omaha	Baxter Arena	7,898	14	2,079	5,094; Nov 30 vs. Bellevue	29,111	26.3%
Oral Roberts	Mabee Center	10,154	13	5,221	6,949; Dec 2 vs. Tulsa	67,882	51.4%
St. Thomas	Schoenecker Arena	1,800	14	1,306	1,614; Jan 25 vs. North Dakota St	18,294	72.6%
South Dakota	Sanford Coyote Sports Center	6,000	14	1,845	3,892; Jan 20 vs. South Dakota St	25,838	30.8%
South Dakota State	Frost Arena	6,500	14	2,587	3,781; Feb 4 vs. South Dakota	36,225	39.8%

Bold - Exceed capacity
As of March 2, 2024
Does not include exhibition games

=== National Television Games ===
Before the 2023–24 season began, the Summit League announced a new media deal with CBS Sports Network that would show up to 12 regular season games (6 guaranteed men's games) on the network, as well as moving the league's tournament final games to CBSSN. On October 18, 2023, the Summit League and CBS Sports Network announced the league's 2023-24 slate of games to appear on the network throughout the conference season. Those games and any others that league members played are listed here.

Summit League members in bold

Date Time (CT)	Road Team	Home team	Final Score	Network
November 11, 2023; 1 PM	**North Dakota State**	No. 8 Creighton	**60**–89	FS2
November 14, 2023; 8 PM	**South Dakota**	DePaul	**60**–72	FS2
December 14, 2023; 7 PM	**St. Thomas**	No. 7 Marquette	**79**–84	FS1
December 29, 2023; 7 PM	**St. Thomas**	**North Dakota**	**UST** 70–45	CBSSN
December 31, 2023; 2 PM	**Omaha**	**South Dakota**	**OMAHA** 67–51	CBSSN
January 6, 2024; 7 PM	Weber State	**Oral Roberts**	83–**78**	CBSSN
January 25, 2024; 6 PM	**Kansas City**	**South Dakota State**	**SDSU** 75–66	CBSSN
February 4, 2024; 4 PM	**South Dakota**	**South Dakota State**	**SDSU** 70–67	CBSSN
February 10, 2024; 3 PM	**Oral Roberts**	**South Dakota State**	**SDSU** 83–72	CBSSN
February 24, 2024; 1 PM	**North Dakota**	**North Dakota State**	**NDSU** 73–68	CBSSN

=== All-League Honors ===
Honor	Recipient
Player of the Year	Zeke Mayo, South Dakota State
Defensive Player of the Year	William Kyle III, South Dakota State
Sixth Man of the Year	Khristion Courseault, Kansas City
Freshman of the Year	Jayson Petty, Kansas City
Newcomer of the Year	Jamar Brown, Kansas City
Coach of the Year	Marvin Menzies, Kansas City
All-Summit League First Team	Zeke Mayo, South Dakota State
All-Summit League First Team	Jamar Brown, Kansas City
All-Summit League First Team	Tommy Bruner, Denver
All-Summit League First Team	Frankie Fidler, Omaha
All-Summit League First Team	William Kyle III, South Dakota State
All-Summit League First Team	B.J. Omot, North Dakota
All-Summit League Second Team	Raheem Anthony, St. Thomas
All-Summit League Second Team	Parker Bjorklund, St. Thomas
All-Summit League Second Team	Tyree Ihenacho, North Dakota
All-Summit League Second Team	Issac McBride, Oral Roberts
All-Summit League Second Team	Andrew Morgan, North Dakota State
All-Summit League Honorable Mention	Charlie Easley, South Dakota State
All-Summit League Honorable Mention	Boden Skunberg, North Dakota State
All-Summit League Honorable Mention	Kaleb Stewart, South Dakota
All-Summit League Honorable Mention	Touko Tainamo, Denver
All-Summit League Honorable Mention	Lahat Thioune, South Dakota
All-Defensive Team	Babacar Diallo, Kansas City
All-Defensive Team	Charlie Easley, South Dakota State
All-Defensive Team	Eli King, North Dakota
All-Defensive Team	William Kyle III, South Dakota State
All-Defensive Team	Jacari White, North Dakota State
All-Newcomer Team	Raheem Anthony, St. Thomas
All-Newcomer Team	Jamar Brown, Kansas City
All-Newcomer Team	Amar Kuljuhovic, North Dakota
All-Newcomer Team	Kaleb Stewart, South Dakota
All-Newcomer Team	Lahat Thioune, South Dakota

== Postseason ==
=== Conference Tournament ===
All 9 teams qualify for the Summit League tournament. The tournament is held at the Denny Sanford Premier Center in Sioux Falls, South Dakota. It was held from March 8 to March 12, 2024.

First Round; March 8 Summit League Network
8	Oral Roberts	77
9	South Dakota	61

Quarterfinals; March 9 & 10; Summit League Network
1	South Dakota State	79
8	Oral Roberts	63
4	St. Thomas	68
5	North Dakota State	58
2	Kansas City	60
7	Denver	61
3	North Dakota	72
6	Omaha	73

Semifinals; March 11; Summit League Network
1	South Dakota State	59
4	St. Thomas	49
7	Denver	66
6	Omaha	63

Championship; March 12; CBS Sports Network
1	South Dakota State	76
7	Denver	68

=== NCAA tournament ===
Seed	Region	School	First Round	Second Round	Sweet Sixteen	Elite Eight	Final Four	Championship
No. 15	Omaha Regional	South Dakota State	lost to No. 2 Iowa State 82–65	—	—	—	—	
	1 Bid	W-L (%):	0–1 (.000)	0–0 (–)	0–0 (–)	0–0 (–)	0–0 (–)	TOTAL: 0–1 (.000)
