= 2023–24 South Dakota State Jackrabbits men's basketball team =

American college basketball season

2023–24 South Dakota State Jackrabbits men's basketball

Summit League regular-season and tournament champions

NCAA tournament, first round
- Conference: Summit League
- Record: 22–13 (12–4 The Summit)
- Head coach: Eric Henderson (5th season)
- Associate head coach: Rob Klinkefus
- Assistant coaches: Bryan Petersen; Khyle Marshall
- Home arena: Frost Arena

2023–24 Summit League men's basketball standings
	Conf.				Overall
Team	W		L	PCT	W		L	PCT
South Dakota State †	12	–	4	.750	22	–	13	.629
Kansas City	10	–	6	.625	16	–	16	.500
North Dakota	10	–	6	.625	18	–	14	.563
St. Thomas *	9	–	7	.563	20	–	13	.606
North Dakota State	8	–	8	.500	15	–	17	.469
Omaha	7	–	9	.438	15	–	18	.455
Denver	6	–	10	.375	17	–	17	.500
Oral Roberts	5	–	11	.313	12	–	19	.387
South Dakota	5	–	11	.313	12	–	20	.375
† 2024 Summit League tournament winner * Ineligible for the 2024 NCAA tournament due to transition from Division III

The 2023–24 South Dakota State Jackrabbits men's basketball team represented South Dakota State University in the 2023–24 NCAA Division I men's basketball season. The Jackrabbits, led by fifth-year head coach Eric Henderson, played their home games at Frost Arena in Brookings, South Dakota, as members of the Summit League. They finished the season 22–13, 12–4 in Summit League play, to finish in first place.

== Previous season ==
The Jackrabbits finished the 2022–23 season 19–13, 13–5 in Summit League play, to finish in second place. They defeated Omaha in the quarterfinals of the Summit League tournament, before losing to North Dakota State in the semifinals.

== Roster ==
2023–24 South Dakota State Jackrabbits men's basketball team
Players
Coaches

Pos.	#	Name	Height	Weight	Year	Previous school	Hometown
F	0	William Whorton	6 ft 8 in (2.03 m)	205 lb (93 kg)	Fr	Rufus King High School	Milwaukee, WI
G	1	Matt Mims	6 ft 0 in (1.83 m)	175 lb (79 kg)	Sr	Xavier High School	Cedar Rapids, IA
G	2	Zeke Mayo	6 ft 4 in (1.93 m)	185 lb (84 kg)	Jr	Lawrence High School	Lawrence, KS
G	3	Joe Sayler	6 ft 3 in (1.91 m)	200 lb (91 kg)	Fr	White River High School	White River, SD
F	5	Nate Barnhart	7 ft 0 in (2.13 m)	200 lb (91 kg)	So	Wyoming	Lenexa, KS
G	10	Kalen Garry	6 ft 3 in (1.91 m)	200 lb (91 kg)	RS Fr	De Smet High School	De Smet, SD
F	11	Matthew Mors	6 ft 7 in (2.01 m)	225 lb (102 kg)	So	Wisconsin	Yankton, SD
G	12	Bubz Alvarez	6 ft 5 in (1.96 m)	185 lb (84 kg)	Fr	Houston Heights High School	Houston, TX
F	13	Luke Appel	6 ft 8 in (2.03 m)	240 lb (109 kg)	RS Sr	Kirkwood Community College	Marshalltown, IA
G	15	Tanner Te Slaa	6 ft 5 in (1.96 m)	195 lb (88 kg)	So	Boyden–Hull High School	Hull, IA
G	23	Jack Hastreiter	6 ft 7 in (2.01 m)	220 lb (100 kg)	RS Fr	Pius X High School	Lincoln, NE
F	24	Conner Kraft	6 ft 8 in (2.03 m)	205 lb (93 kg)	Fr	Shanley High School	Fargo, ND
G	30	Charlie Easley	6 ft 2 in (1.88 m)	190 lb (86 kg)	Sr	Nebraska	Lincoln, NE
F	34	Damon Wilkinson	6 ft 10 in (2.08 m)	260 lb (118 kg)	Fr	De Smet High School	De Smet, SD
F	42	William III Kyle	6 ft 9 in (2.06 m)	230 lb (104 kg)	So	Bellevue West High School	Bellevue, NE

Head coach

- Eric Henderson (Wayne State (NE))

Assistant coach(es)

- Rob Klinkefus (Buena Vista)
- Bryan Petersen (Iowa State)
- Khyle Marshall (Butler)

Legend

- (C) Team captain
- (S) Suspended
- (I) Ineligible
- (W) Walk-on
- Injured
- Current redshirt

Roster
Last update: December 7, 2023

== Schedule and results ==
Date time, TV	Rank^{#}	Opponent^{#}	Result	Record	Site (attendance) city, state
Exhibition
November 1, 2023*; 8:30 p.m.		Mary	W 91–51	–	Frost Arena; Brookings, SD
Regular season
November 6, 2023*; 8:15 p.m., SLN		Akron	L 75–81	0–1	Frost Arena (2,617); Brookings, SD
November 8, 2023*; 7:00 p.m., SLN		Dakota Wesleyan	W 83–55	1–1	Frost Arena (2,101); Brookings, SD
November 13, 2023*; 7:00 p.m., ESPN+		at Kansas State	L 68–91	1–2	Bramlage Coliseum (9,421); Manhattan, KS
November 19, 2023*; 7:00 p.m.		vs. UCF; Jacksonville Classic Coast semifinals	L 80–83	1–3	Flagler Gymnasium (609); St. Augustine, FL
November 20, 2023*; 5:00 p.m.		vs. George Mason; Jacksonville Classic Coast consolation	L 71–73	1–4	Flagler Gymnasium (425); St. Augustine, FL
November 22, 2023*; 7:00 p.m., ESPN+		at Southern Miss; Jacksonville Classic campus-site game	W 65–54	2–4	Reed Green Coliseum (3,945); Hattiesburg, MS
November 27, 2023*; 7:00 p.m., SLN		Mount Marty	W 92–70	3–4	Frost Arena (1,326); Brookings, SD
December 1, 2023*; 7:00 p.m., MidcoSN2		vs. Towson	W 61–48	4–4	Sanford Pentagon (2,326); Sioux Falls, SD
December 5, 2023*; 8:15 p.m., SLN/MidcoSN		Kent State	L 73–82	4–5	Frost Arena (2,453); Brookings, SD
December 9, 2023*; 6:00 p.m.		vs. Wichita State	W 79–69	5–5	Intrust Bank Arena (4,076); Wichita, KS
December 14, 2023*; 7:00 p.m., SLN		Mayville State	W 94–62	6–5	Frost Arena (1,279); Brookings, SD
December 20, 2023*; 6:00 p.m.		vs. Wyoming; Sun Bowl Invitational semifinals	L 65–78	6–6	Don Haskins Center; El Paso, TX
December 21, 2023*; 6:00 p.m.		vs. Norfolk State; Sun Bowl Invitational consolation game	L 65–84	6–7	Don Haskins Center; El Paso, TX
December 31, 2023; 2:00 p.m., SLN/MidcoSN		North Dakota	W 80–61	7–7 (1–0)	Frost Arena (3,029); Brookings, SD
January 3, 2024*; 8:00 p.m., ESPN+		at Weber State; Summit League–Big Sky Challenge	L 73–75	7–8	Dee Events Center (5,107); Ogden, UT
January 6, 2024*; 4:15 p.m., SLN		Montana State; Big Sky–Summit League Challenge	W 89–61	8–8	Frost Arena (2,167); Brookings, SD
January 11, 2024; 7:00 p.m., SLN		at St. Thomas	W 81–80	9–8 (2–0)	Schoenecker Arena (1,515); St. Paul, MN
January 13, 2024; 2:00 p.m., SLN		at Denver	L 80–99	9–9 (3–1)	Hamilton Gymnasium (198); Denver, CO
January 18, 2024; 7:00 p.m., SLN		Omaha	W 90–87	10–9 (3–1)	Frost Arena (2,831); Brookings, SD
January 20, 2024; 1:00 p.m., SLN/MidcoSN		at South Dakota	W 73–55	11–9 (4–1)	Sanford Coyote Sports Center (3,892); Vermillion, SD
January 25, 2024; 6:00 p.m., CBSSN		Kansas City	W 75–66	12–9 (5–1)	Frost Arena (2,012); Brookings, SD
January 27, 2024; 7:00 p.m., SLN		at Oral Roberts	L 82–87	12–10 (5–2)	Mabee Center (6,914); Tulsa, OK
February 1, 2024; 7:00 p.m., SLN/MidcoSN		North Dakota State	L 73–74	12–11 (5–3)	Frost Arena (3,418); Brookings, SD
February 4, 2024; 4:00 p.m., CBSSN		South Dakota	W 70–67	13–11 (6–3)	Frost Arena (3,781); Brookings, SD
February 10, 2024; 3:00 p.m., CBSSN		Oral Roberts	W 83–72	14–11 (7–3)	Frost Arena (3,422); Brookings, SD
February 15, 2024; 7:00 p.m., SLN		at Kansas City	L 67–72	14–12 (7–4)	Swinney Recreation Center (1,507); Kansas City, MO
February 17, 2024; 7:00 p.m., SLN		at Omaha	W 85–77 ^{OT}	15–12 (8–4)	Baxter Arena (3,778); Omaha, NE
February 22, 2024; 7:00 p.m., SLN/MidcoSN2		Denver	W 97–70	16–12 (9–4)	Frost Arena (2,653); Brookings, SD
February 24, 2024; 2:00 p.m., SLN		St. Thomas	W 77–72	17–12 (10–4)	Frost Arena (3,136); Brookings, SD
February 29, 2024; 7:00 p.m., SLN/MidcoSN		at North Dakota	W 72–62	18–12 (11–4)	Betty Engelstad Sioux Center (2,075); Grand Forks, ND
March 2, 2024; 1:00 p.m., SLN		at North Dakota State	W 78–61	19–12 (12–4)	Scheels Center (2,917); Fargo, ND
Summit League tournament
March 9, 2024; 6:00 p.m., MidcoSN/SLN	(1)	vs. (8) Oral Roberts; Quarterfinals	W 79–63	20–12	Denny Sanford Premier Center; Sioux Falls, SD
March 11, 2024; 6:00 p.m., MidcoSN/SLN	(1)	vs. (4) St. Thomas; Semifinals	W 59–49	21–12	Denny Sanford Premier Center; Sioux Falls, SD
March 12, 2024; 8:30 p.m., CBSSN	(1)	vs. (7) Denver; Championship	W 76–68	22–12	Denny Sanford Premier Center (8,268); Sioux Falls, SD
NCAA tournament
March 21, 2024; 6:35 p.m., TruTV	(15 E)	vs. (2 E) No. 4 Iowa State; First round	L 65–82	22–13	CHI Health Center; Omaha, NE
*Non-conference game. ^{#}Rankings from AP poll. (#) Tournament seedings in parentheses. All times are in Central.
