= 2023–24 Oral Roberts Golden Eagles men's basketball team =

American college basketball season

2023–24 Oral Roberts Golden Eagles men's basketball
- Conference: Summit League
- Record: 12–19 (5–11 Summit)
- Head coach: Russell Springmann (1st season)
- Assistant coaches: Sam Patterson; Antonio Bostic; Bill Lewis; Steve Upshaw; Dave Nedbalek
- Home arena: Mabee Center

2023–24 Summit League men's basketball standings
	Conf.				Overall
Team	W		L	PCT	W		L	PCT
South Dakota State †	12	–	4	.750	22	–	13	.629
Kansas City	10	–	6	.625	16	–	16	.500
North Dakota	10	–	6	.625	18	–	14	.563
St. Thomas *	9	–	7	.563	20	–	13	.606
North Dakota State	8	–	8	.500	15	–	17	.469
Omaha	7	–	9	.438	15	–	18	.455
Denver	6	–	10	.375	17	–	17	.500
Oral Roberts	5	–	11	.313	12	–	19	.387
South Dakota	5	–	11	.313	12	–	20	.375
† 2024 Summit League tournament winner * Ineligible for the 2024 NCAA tournament due to transition from Division III

The 2023–24 Oral Roberts Golden Eagles men's basketball team represented Oral Roberts University during the 2023–24 NCAA Division I men's basketball season. The Golden Eagles, led by first-year head coach Russell Springmann, played their home games at the Mabee Center in Tulsa, Oklahoma, as members of the Summit League.

On March 22, 2023, head coach Paul Mills left the school to take the head coaching position at Wichita State. Shortly thereafter, the school named assistant coach Russell Springmann the team's new head coach.

== Previous season ==
The Golden Eagles finished the 2022–23 season 30–5, 18–0 in Summit League play, to win the regular-season championship. They defeated North Dakota, St. Thomas and North Dakota State to win the Summit League tournament championship. As a result, the received the conference's automatic bid to the NCAA tournament as the No. 12 seed in the East region. There they lost to Duke in the first round.

== Roster ==
2023–24 Oral Roberts Golden Eagles men's basketball team
Players
Coaches

Pos.	#	Name	Height	Weight	Year	Hometown
G	0	Demari Williams	6 ft 6 in (1.98 m)	219 lb (99 kg)	RS So	Houston, TX
F	1	Braeden Moore	6 ft 8 in (2.03 m)	226 lb (103 kg)	RS Fr	Nashville, TN
G	2	Kareem Thompson	6 ft 5 in (1.96 m)	210 lb (95 kg)	GS	Florence, AL
G	4	Jake Shannon	6 ft 4 in (1.93 m)	220 lb (100 kg)	Jr	Ada, OK
G	5	Cam Amboree	6 ft 2 in (1.88 m)	173 lb (78 kg)	So	Pearland, TX
G	10	Isaac McBride	6 ft 1 in (1.85 m)	173 lb (78 kg)	Sr	Little Rock, AR
G	11	Pablo Navarro	6 ft 6 in (1.98 m)	205 lb (93 kg)	Fr	Valencia, Spain
G	12	Jalen Miller	6 ft 2 in (1.88 m)	202 lb (92 kg)	Jr	Frederick, MD
G	13	Jonathan Alexandre	6 ft 6 in (1.98 m)	192 lb (87 kg)	Sr	Pétion-Ville, Haiti
F	14	DeShang Weaver	6 ft 7 in (2.01 m)	206 lb (93 kg)	GS	Houston, TX
G	20	Trey Phipps	6 ft 2 in (1.88 m)	181 lb (82 kg)	Sr	Tulsa, OK
C	22	Josh Jones	6 ft 10 in (2.08 m)	240 lb (109 kg)	Fr	Austin, TX
F	23	Sir Issac Herron	6 ft 9 in (2.06 m)	230 lb (104 kg)	RS So	Houston, TX
G	25	Elijah Lawrence	5 ft 11 in (1.8 m)	165 lb (75 kg)	RS So	Bellaire, TX
F	32	Ashton Smith	6 ft 9 in (2.06 m)	260 lb (118 kg)	So	Spring, TX
G	33	Seth Kruse	6 ft 3 in (1.91 m)	176 lb (80 kg)	Fr	Tulsa, OK
G/F	35	Jailen Bedford	6 ft 4 in (1.93 m)	181 lb (82 kg)	Jr	Austin, TX

Head coach

- Russell Springmann (Salisbury)

Assistant coach(es)

- Sam Patterson (Baylor)
- Antonio Bostic
- Bill Lewit (Salisbury)

Legend

- (C) Team captain
- (S) Suspended
- (I) Ineligible
- (W) Walk-on
- Injured
- Current redshirt

Roster
Last update: October 30, 2023

== Schedule and results ==
Date time, TV	Rank^{#}	Opponent^{#}	Result	Record	Site (attendance) city, state
Regular season
November 6, 2023*; 7:00 p.m., ESPN+		at UT Arlington	L 71–75	0–1	UT Arlington College Park Center (2,185); Arlington, TX
November 10, 2023*; 7:00 p.m., KGEB		Mid-American Christian	W 74–69	1–1	Mabee Center (6,002); Tulsa, OK
November 13, 2023*; 7:00 p.m., ESPN+		at Missouri State	L 69–84	1–2	Great Southern Bank Arena (3,248); Springfield, MO
November 17, 2023*; 7:00 p.m., ESPN+		at No. 13 Texas A&M	L 66–74	1–3	Reed Arena (10,689); College Station, TX
November 21, 2023*; 7:00 p.m., SLN		Texas Southern	W 65–63	2–3	Mabee Center (5,893); Tulsa, OK
November 28, 2023*; 7:00 p.m., ESPN+		at Kansas State	L 78–88 ^{OT}	2–4	Bramlage Coliseum (9,887); Manhattan, KS
December 2, 2023*; 7:00 p.m., KGEB		Tulsa	W 79–70	3–4	Mabee Center (6,949); Tulsa, OK
December 9, 2023*; 7:00 p.m., KGEB		Ozark Christian	W 110–51	4–4	Mabee Center (3,392); Tulsa, OK
December 12, 2023*; 8:00 p.m., ESPN+		at Texas Tech	L 76–82	4–5	United Supermarkets Arena (10,280); Lubbock, TX
December 17, 2023*; 4:00 p.m., ESPN+		at Oklahoma State	L 60–81	4–6	Gallagher-Iba Arena (6,170); Stillwater, OK
December 19, 2023*; 7:00 p.m., SLN		John Brown	W 71–59	5–6	Mabee Center (5,417); Tulsa, OK
December 29, 2023; 7:00 p.m., SLN		at Kansas City	L 60–77	5–7 (0–1)	Swinney Recreation Center (1,337); Kansas City, MO
December 31, 2023; 4:00 p.m., SLN		at Denver	W 89–86 ^{OT}	6–7 (1–1)	Hamilton Gymnasium (752); Denver, CO
January 3, 2024*; 7:00 p.m.		at Montana State; Big Sky–Summit Challenge	W 82–76	7–7	Brick Breeden Fieldhouse (2,316); Bozeman, MT
January 6, 2024*; 7:00 p.m., CBSSN		Weber State; Big Sky–Summit Challenge	L 78–83	7–8	Mabee Center (5,557); Tulsa, OK
January 11, 2024; 7:00 p.m., SLN		South Dakota	W 84–66	8–8 (2–1)	Mabee Center (3,517); Tulsa, OK
January 13, 2024; 7:00 p.m., SLN		St. Thomas	L 76–87	8–9 (2–2)	Mabee Center (4,652); Tulsa, OK
January 18, 2024; 7:00 p.m., SLN		at North Dakota	L 77–87	8–10 (2–3)	Betty Engelstad Sioux Center (1,659); Grand Forks, ND
January 20, 2024; 1:00 p.m., SLN		at North Dakota State	L 67–72	8–11 (2–4)	Scheels Center (2,017); Fargo, ND
January 25, 2024; 7:00 p.m., SLN		Omaha	W 74–67	9–11 (3–4)	Mabee Center (4,963); Tulsa, OK
January 27, 2024; 7:00 p.m., SLN		South Dakota State	W 87–82	10–11 (4–4)	Mabee Center (6,914); Tulsa, OK
February 3, 2024; 7:00 p.m., SLN		Denver	W 82–76	11–11 (5–4)	Mabee Center (6,528); Tulsa, OK
February 8, 2024; 7:00 p.m., SLN		at St. Thomas	L 63–85	11–12 (5–5)	Shoenecker Arena (1,148); St. Paul, MN
February 10, 2024; 2:00 p.m., CBSSN		at South Dakota State	L 72–83	11–13 (5–6)	Frost Arena (3,422); Brookings, SD
February 15, 2024; 7:00 p.m., SLN		North Dakota State	L 60–73	11–14 (5–7)	Mabee Center (3,975); Tulsa, OK
February 17, 2024; 7:00 p.m., SLN		North Dakota	L 65–78	11–15 (5–8)	Mabee Center (6,074); Tulsa, OK
February 22, 2024; 7:00 p.m., SLN		at Omaha	L 70–71	11–16 (5–9)	Baxter Arena (2,106); Omaha, NE
February 24, 2024; 1:00 p.m., SLN		at South Dakota	L 76–77	11–17 (5–10)	Sanford Coyote Sports Center (1,887); Vermillion, SD
March 3, 2024; 7:00 p.m., SLN		Kansas City	L 54–71	11–18 (5–11)	Mabee Center (5,971); Tulsa, OK
Summit League tournament
March 8, 2024; 7:00 p.m., CBSSN/SLN	(8)	vs. (9) South Dakota; First round	W 77–62	12–18	Denny Sanford Premier Center (7,611); Sioux Falls, SD
March 9, 2024; 6:00 p.m., MidcoSN/SLN	(8)	vs. (1) South Dakota State; Quarterfinals	L 63–79	12–19	Denny Sanford Premier Center; Sioux Falls, SD
*Non-conference game. ^{#}Rankings from AP poll. (#) Tournament seedings in parentheses. All times are in Central.
