= 2023–24 North Dakota State Bison men's basketball team =

College men's basketball team season

2023–24 North Dakota State Bison men's basketball
- Conference: Summit League
- Record: 15–17 (8–8 Summit)
- Head coach: David Richman (10th season)
- Associate head coach: Joshua Jones
- Assistant coaches: Josh Sash; Spencer Wilker
- Home arena: Scheels Center

2023–24 Summit League men's basketball standings
	Conf.				Overall
Team	W		L	PCT	W		L	PCT
South Dakota State †	12	–	4	.750	22	–	13	.629
Kansas City	10	–	6	.625	16	–	16	.500
North Dakota	10	–	6	.625	18	–	14	.563
St. Thomas *	9	–	7	.563	20	–	13	.606
North Dakota State	8	–	8	.500	15	–	17	.469
Omaha	7	–	9	.438	15	–	18	.455
Denver	6	–	10	.375	17	–	17	.500
Oral Roberts	5	–	11	.313	12	–	19	.387
South Dakota	5	–	11	.313	12	–	20	.375
† 2024 Summit League tournament winner * Ineligible for the 2024 NCAA tournament due to transition from Division III

The 2023–24 North Dakota State Bison men's basketball team represented North Dakota State University during the 2023–24 NCAA Division I men's basketball season. The Bison, led by tenth-year head coach David Richman, played their home games at the Scheels Center in Fargo, North Dakota as members of the Summit League.

The Bison finished the season with a 15–17 record, 8–8 in Summit League play, to finish in fifth place. They made for the Summit League tournament, but lost to fourth-seeded St. Thomas in the quarterfinals to be eliminated from postseason contention.

== Previous season ==
The Bison finished the 2022–23 season 16–17, 11–7 in Summit League play, to finish in third place. In the Summit League tournament, they defeated South Dakota in the quarterfinals and South Dakota State in the semifinals before losing to Oral Roberts in the finals.

== Offseason ==
=== Departures ===
Name	Number	Pos.	Height	Weight	Year	Hometown	Reason for departure
Dezmond McKinney	0	G	6' 0"	180	Junior	Raytown, MO	Transferred to Bellarmine
Grant Nelson	4	F	6' 11"	235	Junior	Devils Lake, ND	Transferred to Alabama
Luke Yoder	5	G	6' 0"	180	Junior	Normal, IL	Transferred to Illinois Wesleyan University

=== Incoming transfers ===
Name	Number	Pos.	Height	Weight	Year	Hometown	Previous school
Jeremiah Burke	5	F	6' 7"	210	Junior	Milwaukee, WI	Iowa Lakes Community College (NJCAA)

=== 2023 recruiting class ===
College recruiting information
Name	Hometown	School	Height	Weight	Commit date
Eli Bradley; G	Las Vegas, NV	Bishop Gorman High School	6 ft 3 in (1.91 m)	170 lb (77 kg)	Nov 9, 2022
Eli Bradley; G	Recruit ratings: Scout: Rivals: 247Sports: ESPN: (0)				
Darik Dissette; G	Minot, ND	Minot High School	6 ft 4 in (1.93 m)	185 lb (84 kg)	Jun 17, 2022
Darik Dissette; G	Recruit ratings: Scout: Rivals: 247Sports: ESPN: (0)				
Mark Nikolich-Wilson; F	Arlington Heights, IL	Rolling Meadows High School	6 ft 8 in (2.03 m)	280 lb (130 kg)	
Mark Nikolich-Wilson; F	Recruit ratings: Scout: Rivals: 247Sports: ESPN: (0)				
Overall recruit ranking:
Note: In many cases, Scout, Rivals, 247Sports, On3, and ESPN may conflict in their listings of height and weight.; In these cases, the average was taken. ESPN grades are on a 100-point scale.; Sources: "2023 Team Ranking". Rivals.

== Roster ==
2023–24 North Dakota State Bison men's basketball team
Players
Coaches

Pos.	#	Name	Height	Weight	Year	Previous school	Hometown
G	0	Eli Bradley	6 ft 3 in (1.91 m)	170 lb (77 kg)	Fr	Bishop Gorman High School	Las Vegas, NV
G	2	Tajavis Miller	6 ft 4 in (1.93 m)	200 lb (91 kg)	So	Frenship High School	Lubbock, TX
F	5	Jeremiah Burke	6 ft 7 in (2.01 m)	210 lb (95 kg)	Jr	Iowa Lakes Community College	Milwaukee, WI
G	10	Damari Wheeler-Thomas	6 ft 0 in (1.83 m)	185 lb (84 kg)	So	Larkin High School	Elgin, IL
G	11	Jacari White	6 ft 3 in (1.91 m)	175 lb (79 kg)	Jr	State College of Florida	Orlando, FL
G	12	Lance Waddles	6 ft 3 in (1.91 m)	190 lb (86 kg)	So	Evangel Christian Academy	Shreveport, LA
G	13	Darik Dissette	6 ft 4 in (1.93 m)	185 lb (84 kg)	Fr	Minot High School	Minot, ND
G	14	Boden Skunberg	6 ft 5 in (1.96 m)	210 lb (95 kg)	Sr	Jamestown High School	Jamestown, ND
F	22	Joshua Streit	6 ft 10 in (2.08 m)	245 lb (111 kg)	Jr	Eden Valley-Watkins High School	Watkins, MN
F	23	Andrew Morgan	6 ft 10 in (2.08 m)	245 lb (111 kg)	Jr	Waseca High School	Waseca, MN
G	24	Ryan Sletten	6 ft 4 in (1.93 m)	190 lb (86 kg)	So	Larimore High School	Larimore, ND
F	33	Sam Hastreiter	6 ft 7 in (2.01 m)	220 lb (100 kg)	So	Pius X Catholic High School	Lincoln, NE
F	34	Noah Feddersen	6 ft 10 in (2.08 m)	245 lb (111 kg)	RS Fr	Menomonie High School	Menomonie, WI
F	40	Mark Nikolich-Wilson	6 ft 8 in (2.03 m)	280 lb (127 kg)	Fr	Rolling Meadows High School	Arlington Heights, IL

Head coach

- David Richman (North Dakota State)

Assistant coach(es)

- Joshua Jones (Eastern Kentucky)
- Luke Strege (UW–La Crosse)
- Spencer Wilker (North Dakota State)

Legend

- (C) Team captain
- (S) Suspended
- (I) Ineligible
- (W) Walk-on
- Injured
- Current redshirt

Roster

== Schedule and results ==
Date time, TV	Rank^{#}	Opponent^{#}	Result	Record	High points	High rebounds	High assists	Site (attendance) city, state
Exhibition
October 27, 2023*; 7:00 p.m.		St. Olaf	W 93–50	–	19 – Miller	8 – Feddersen	3 – Waddles	Scheels Center (1,007); Fargo, ND
Regular season
November 6, 2023*; 6:00 p.m., ESPN+		at Western Michigan	W 80–76 ^{OT}	1–0	25 – Skunberg	13 – Morgan	6 – Wheeler-Thomas	University Arena (1,364); Kalamazoo, MI
November 8, 2023*; 7:00 p.m., WDAY Xtra/Summit League Network		Mount Marty	W 93–66	2–0	17 – Skunberg	10 – Miller	4 – White	Scheels Center (1,032); Fargo, ND
November 11, 2023*; 1:00 p.m., FS2		at No. 8 Creighton	L 60–89	2–1	15 – Wheeler-Thomas	6 – Skunberg	3 – Wheeler-Thomas	CHI Health Center Omaha (16,911); Omaha, NE
November 14, 2023*; 3:00 p.m., ESPN+		vs. UC Davis; Basketball Travelers Mike Montgomery Classic	L 53–68	2–2	12 – Skunberg	8 – Skunberg	3 – 2 tied	Dahlberg Arena (71); Missoula, MT
November 16, 2023*; 9:00 p.m., ESPN+		at Montana; Basketball Travelers Mike Montgomery Classic	W 78–69	3–2	22 – Wheeler-Thomas	7 – Miller	4 – Skunberg	Dahlberg Arena (2,653); Missoula, MT
November 20, 2023*; 7:00 p.m., WDAY Xtra/SLN		Wisconsin–Stout	W 101–72	4–2	26 – Waddles	10 – Miller	5 – Wheeler-Thomas	Scheels Center (1,018); Fargo, ND
November 25, 2023*; 7:00 p.m., ESPN+		at Grand Canyon	L 71–86	4–3	25 – Skunberg	8 – Skunberg	3 – Wheeler-Thomas	GCU Arena (7,208); Phoenix, AZ
November 27, 2023*; 10:00 p.m.		at San Jose State	L 65–78	4–4	18 – Wheeler-Thomas	6 – Morgan	3 – Wheeler-Thomas	Provident Credit Union Event Center (1,322); San Jose, CA
December 4, 2023*; 7:00 p.m., WDAY Xtra/SLN		San Jose State	W 83–78 ^{OT}	5–4	17 – Fedderson	9 – Miller	5 – Miller	Scheels Center (1,946); Fargo, ND
December 7, 2023*; 7:00 p.m., WDAY Xtra/SLN		Portland	W 78–67	6–4	16 – Morgan	6 – Morgan	6 – Skunberg	Scheels Center (1,234); Fargo, ND
December 10, 2023*; 1:00 p.m., WDAY Xtra/SLN		Oak Hills Christian	W 108–14	7–4	19 – Waddles	8 – 3 tied	5 – Waddles	Scheels Center (1,016); Fargo, ND
December 17, 2023*; 3:00 p.m., ESPN+		at Illinois State	L 65–75	7–5	18 – Miller	7 – 2 tied	3 – Wheeler-Thomas	CEFCU Arena (2,953); Normal, IL
December 19, 2023*; 7:00 p.m., ESPN+		at Southern Illinois	L 63–76	7–6	19 – Skunberg	5 – Wheeler-Thomas	3 – Wheeler-Thomas	Banterra Center (3,932); Carbondale, IL
December 29, 2023; 7:00 p.m., WDAY Xtra/SLN		South Dakota	L 66–75	7–7 (0–1)	19 – Morgan	7 – Skunberg	4 – Wheeler-Thomas	Scheels Center (2,674); Fargo, ND
January 3, 2024*; 7:00 p.m., WDAY Xtra/SLN		Montana; Big Sky–Summit Challenge	L 86–96	7–8	19 – Miller	8 – Feddersen	4 – White	Scheels Center (1,592); Fargo, ND
January 6, 2024*; 4:00 p.m., ESPN+		at Eastern Washington; Big Sky–Summit Challenge	L 83–91	7–9	23 – 2 tied	6 – Morgan	2 – 3 tied	Reese Court (1,192); Cheney, WA
January 11, 2024; 7:00 p.m., SLN		at Kansas City	W 92–91 ^{2OT}	8–9 (1–1)	23 – Skunberg	6 – Skunberg	5 – 2 tied	Swinney Recreation Center (818); Kansas City, MO
January 13, 2024; 7:00 p.m., SLN		at Omaha	L 92–96 ^{OT}	8–10 (1–2)	30 – Wheeler-Thomas	7 – Morgan	6 – White	Baxter Arena (1,047); Omaha, NE
January 18, 2024; 7:00 p.m., WDAY Xtra/SLN		Denver	L 70–78	8–11 (1–3)	15 – Skunberg	6 – Skunberg	4 – Wheeler-Thomas	Scheels Center (1,527); Fargo, ND
January 20, 2024; 1:00 p.m., WDAY Xtra/SLN		Oral Roberts	W 72–67	9–11 (2–3)	20 – Skunberg	13 – Morgan	4 – Morgan	Scheels Center (2,017); Fargo, ND
January 25, 2024; 7:00 p.m., SLN		at St. Thomas	L 66–79	9–12 (2–4)	20 – Feddersen	7 – Skunberg	4 – Feddersen	Shoenecker Arena (1,614); St. Paul, MN
February 1, 2024; 7:00 p.m., MidcoSN/SLN		at South Dakota State	W 74–73 ^{OT}	10–12 (3–4)	14 – Skunberg	10 – Skunberg	3 – Morgan	Frost Arena (3,418); Brookings, SD
February 3, 2024; 3:30 p.m., MidcoSN/SLN		at North Dakota	L 58–60	10–13 (3–5)	14 – Morgan	10 – Miller	2 – 3 tied	Betty Engelstad Sioux Center (3,065); Grand Forks, ND
February 8, 2024; 7:00 p.m., WDAY Xtra/SLN		Kansas City	W 82–78 ^{OT}	11–13 (4–5)	31 – Morgan	7 – Skunberg	4 – Skunberg	Scheels Center (1,289); Fargo, ND
February 10, 2024; 1:00 p.m., WDAY Xtra/SLN		Omaha	W 81–79	12–13 (5–5)	18 – Morgan	8 – Feddersen	5 – Feddersen	Scheels Center (2,204); Fargo, ND
February 15, 2024; 7:00 p.m., SLN		at Oral Roberts	W 73–60	13–13 (6–5)	18 – 2 tied	10 – Feddersen	3 – Waddles	Mabee Center (3,975); Tulsa, OK
February 17, 2024; 3:00 p.m., SLN		at Denver	L 71–77	13–14 (6–6)	21 – Miller	8 – White	5 – White	Hamilton Gymnasium (1,038); Denver, CO
February 22, 2024; 7:00 p.m., WDAY/SLN		St. Thomas	W 64–50	14–14 (7–6)	17 – Morgan	10 – White	2 – 3 tied	Scheels Center (1,579); Fargo, ND
February 24, 2024; 1:00 p.m., CBSSN		North Dakota	W 73–68	15–14 (8–6)	27 – Morgan	8 – Feddersen	3 – White	Scheels Center (5,058); Fargo, ND
February 29, 2024; 7:00 pm, SLN		at South Dakota	L 68–88	15–15 (8–7)	16 – 2 tied	6 – 2 tied	2 – 3 tied	Sanford Coyote Sports Center (1,717); Vermillion, SD
March 2, 2024; 1:00 p.m., WDAY Xtra/SLN		South Dakota State	L 61–78	15–16 (8–8)	16 – White	6 – Morgan	3 – Morgan	Scheels Center (2,917); Fargo, ND
Summit League tournament
March 10, 2024; 6:00 p.m., SLN	(5)	vs. (4) St. Thomas; Quarterfinals	L 58–68	15–17	16 – White	8 – Skunberg	4 – Skunberg	Denny Sanford Premier Center; Sioux Falls, SD
*Non-conference game. ^{#}Rankings from AP poll. (#) Tournament seedings in parentheses. All times are in Central.

== Awards and accolades ==
=== Summit League Player of the Week ===
Week	Player(s) of the Week	School
Feb. 12	Andrew Morgan	North Dakota State
