= 2023–24 Kansas City Roos men's basketball team =

American college basketball season

2023–24 Kansas City Roos men's basketball
- Conference: Summit League
- Record: 16–16 (10–6 Summit)
- Head coach: Marvin Menzies (2nd season)
- Associate head coach: Joe Esposito (2nd season)
- Assistant coaches: Michael Bowden (2nd season); Aerick Sanders (2nd season); Zeb Kujolic (1st season); Anthony Richardson (1st season)
- Home arena: Swinney Recreation Center

2023–24 Summit League men's basketball standings
	Conf.				Overall
Team	W		L	PCT	W		L	PCT
South Dakota State †	12	–	4	.750	22	–	13	.629
Kansas City	10	–	6	.625	16	–	16	.500
North Dakota	10	–	6	.625	18	–	14	.563
St. Thomas *	9	–	7	.563	20	–	13	.606
North Dakota State	8	–	8	.500	15	–	17	.469
Omaha	7	–	9	.438	15	–	18	.455
Denver	6	–	10	.375	17	–	17	.500
Oral Roberts	5	–	11	.313	12	–	19	.387
South Dakota	5	–	11	.313	12	–	20	.375
† 2024 Summit League tournament winner * Ineligible for the 2024 NCAA tournament due to transition from Division III

The 2023–24 Kansas City Roos men's basketball team represented the University of Missouri–Kansas City during the 2023–24 NCAA Division I men's basketball season. The Roos, led by second-year head coach Marvin Menzies, played their home games on-campus at Swinney Recreation Center in Kansas City, Missouri as a member of the Summit League.

The Roos finished the season 16–16 overall, 10–6 in The Summit to finish in a tie for second place. As the second seed, they were defeated by Denver in the Summit League tournament quarterfinal round.

== Previous season ==
The Roos finished the 2022–23 season with a record of 11–21 overall, 7–11 in the Summit League to finish in a tie for sixth place.

== Roster ==
2023–24 Kansas City Roos men's basketball team
Players
Coaches

Pos.	#	Name	Height	Weight	Year	Previous school	Hometown
G	13	Khristion Courseault	6 ft 2 in (1.88 m)	180 lb (82 kg)	GS	Chattanooga/ HCU/ Nevada/ Pasadena City; Loyola HS	Los Angeles, CA
G	11	Anderson Kopp	6 ft 6 in (1.98 m)	190 lb (86 kg)	GS	Lamar; St. Thomas HS	Houston, TX
G	0	Artese Stapleton	6 ft 3 in (1.91 m)	170 lb (77 kg)	GS	Lincoln (MO)/ Radford/ Lewis; Kenwood	Chicago, IL
G	2	Babacar Diallo	6 ft 6 in (1.98 m)	197 lb (89 kg)	Sr	Navarro/ Saint Peter's; The Patrick	Dakar, Senegal
G/F	5	Jamar Brown	6 ft 5 in (1.96 m)	200 lb (91 kg)	Jr	Phoenix; Hamilton HS	Chandler, AZ
F/C	20	Melvyn Ebonkoli	6 ft 8 in (2.03 m)	229 lb (104 kg)	Jr	Independence CC/ Missouri State; Putnam Science Academy/ Polyvalent Le Mans Sud	Trappes, France
G/F	30	Cameron Faas	6 ft 6 in (1.98 m)	215 lb (98 kg)	Jr	Scottsdale CC; Arcadia HS	Scottsdale, AZ
F	23	Allen David Mukeba, Jr.	6 ft 7 in (2.01 m)	235 lb (107 kg)	Jr	Colby CC; Golden State Prep/ Napa Christian HS	Charleroi, Belgium
G	25	Tyler Andrews	6 ft 6 in (1.98 m)	190 lb (86 kg)	So	Kimball Union	Cedar Rapids, IA
G	14	Cole Glasgow	6 ft 2 in (1.88 m)	175 lb (79 kg)	So	Dallas Center–Grimes Community HS	Grimes, IA
F	10	Precious C. Idiaru	6 ft 9 in (2.06 m)	—	So	Los Angeles Premier Prep	Speyer, Germany
F	12	Promise C. Idiaru	6 ft 9 in (2.06 m)	—	So	Los Angeles Premier Prep	Speyer, Germany
F	32	Jeff Ngandu	6 ft 9 in (2.06 m)	225 lb (102 kg)	So	Seton Hall; Orangeville Prep Basketball/ Burley HS	Lubumbashi, Congo
G	33	Jevin Sullivan	6 ft 5 in (1.96 m)	—	So	North Polk HS	Elkhart, IA
G	3	Malik Olafioye	6 ft 2 in (1.88 m)	190 lb (86 kg)	Fr	Ecorse Community HS	Ecorse, MI
G	1	Jayson Petty	6 ft 4 in (1.93 m)	190 lb (86 kg)	Fr	Phoenix College Preparatory	Phoenix, AZ
F	35	Yulian Ramirez-Montero	6 ft 9 in (2.06 m)	—	Fr	Florida Coastal Prep	Haarlem, Netherlands

Head coach

- Marvin Menzies (UCLA)

Assistant coach(es)

- Joe Esposito (Marist)
- Michael Bowden (Florida)
- Aerick Sanders (San Diego State)
- Zev Kujolic (Hamline (Minnesota))
- Anthony Richardson (Florida State)

Legend

- (C) Team captain
- (S) Suspended
- (I) Ineligible
- (W) Walk-on
- (5Y) Fifth-year senior
- Injured
- Current redshirt

Roster
Last update: November 3, 2024

== Schedule & results ==
Date time, TV	Rank^{#}	Opponent^{#}	Result	Record	High points	High rebounds	High assists	Site (attendance) city, state
Regular season
November 6, 2023*; 7:00 PM, SLN		Avila	W 79–48	1–0	16 – Brown	6 – Tied	4 – Brown	Swinney Recreation Center (1,322); Kansas City, MO
November 11, 2023*; 7:00 PM, SLN		Saint Mary (Kansas)	W 95–42	2–0	18 – Brown	5 – Tied	4 – Kopp	Swinney Recreation Center (1,106); Kansas City, MO
November 14, 2023*; 9:00 PM, ESPN+		at No. 15 Baylor	L 61–99	2–1	15 – Kopp	4 – Tied	4 – Stapleton	Paul J. Meyer Arena (7,903); Waco, TX
November 17, 2023*; 8:00 PM, MWN		at Colorado State	L 61–84	2–2	14 – Kopp	9 – Kopp	6 – Kopp	Auditorium–Gymnasium (3,380); Fort Collins, CO
November 24, 2023*; 10:00 AM, FloHoops		vs. UNC Greensboro; Baha Mar Hoops; Nassau Championship [Quarterfinal]	L 64–76	2–3	18 – Faas	10 – Brown	5 – Kopp	Baha Mar Convention Center (239); Nassau, Bahamas
November 25, 2023*; 10:00 AM, FloHoops		vs. Brown; Baha Mar Hoops; Nassau Championship [Consolation Semifinal]	L 83–93 ^{OT}	2–4	19 – Kopp	6 – Ebonkoli	3 – Tied	Baha Mar Convention Center (211); Nassau, Bahamas
November 26, 2023*; 10:00 AM, FloHoops		vs. Middle Tennessee; Baha Mar Hoops; Nassau Championship [Seventh Place]	L 59–63	2–5	14 – Stapleton	5 – Tied	4 – Stapleton	Baha Mar Convention Center (234); Nassau, Bahamas
November 30, 2023*; 7:00 PM, SLN		Southeast Missouri State	W 74–44	3–5	19 – Brown	9 – Faas	3 – Faas	Swinney Recreation Center (1,297); Kansas City, MO
December 5, 2023*; 7:00 PM, ESPN+		at No. 2 Kansas	L 69–88	3–6	18 – Tied	8 – Mukeba, Jr.	4 – Courseault	Allen Fieldhouse (16,300); Lawrence, KS
December 9, 2023*; 3:00 PM, ESPN+		at Lindenwood	W 72–67	4–6	18 – Tied	8 – Kopp	7 – Courseault	Robert F. Hyland Performance Arena (678); St. Charles, MO
December 12, 2023*; 7:00 PM, SLN		Tabor	W 80–57	5–6	29 – Brown	8 – Ebonkoli	6 – Courseault	Swinney Recreation Center (703); Kansas City, MO
December 16, 2023*; 1:00 PM, ESPN+		at Bowling Green	L 69–79	5–7	18 – Courseault	11 – Mukeba, Jr.	6 – Courseault	Stroh Center (1,561); Bowling Green, OH
December 20, 2023*; 6:30 PM, ESPN+		at East Tennessee State	L 57–70	5–8	12 – Tied	8 – Faas	2 – Tied	Freedom Hall Civic Center (3,281); Johnson City, TN
December 29, 2023; 7:00 PM, SLN		Oral Roberts	W 77–60	6–8 (1–0)	22 – Brown	10 – Brown	12 – Courseault	Swinney Recreation Center (1,377); Kansas City, MO
December 31, 2023; 2:00 PM, SLN		at St. Thomas	L 56–77	6–9 (1–1)	10 – Diallo	9 – Ebonkoli	5 – Courseault	Schoenecker Arena (1,165); St. Paul, MN
January 3, 2024*; 8:00 PM, ESPN+		at Sacramento State; Big Sky–Summit Challenge	L 64–67	6–10	17 – Brown	11 – Brown	5 – Courseault	The Hornets Nest (438); Sacramento, CA
January 6, 2024*; 7:00 PM, SLN		Portland State; Big Sky–Summit Challenge	W 83–67	7–10	18 – Mukeba, Jr.	10 – Brown	7 – Diallo	Swinney Recreation Center (1,030); Kansas City, MO
January 11, 2024; 7:00 PM, SLN		North Dakota State	L 91–92 ^{2OT}	7–11 (1–2)	18 – Brown	8 – Tied	5 – Courseault	Swinney Recreation Center (818); Kansas City, MO
January 13, 2024; 2:00 PM, SLN		North Dakota	L 69–82	7–12 (1–3)	14 – Diallo	7 – Tied	7 – Diallo	Swinney Recreation Center (575); Kansas City, MO
January 20, 2024; 12:00 PM, SLN		at Omaha	W 74–72	8–12 (2–3)	15 – Faas	7 – Mukeba, Jr.	7 – Courseault	Baxter Arena (1,517); Omaha, NE
January 25, 2024; 6:00 PM, CBSSN		at South Dakota State	L 66–75	8–13 (2–4)	17 – Brown	6 – Ngandu	6 – Diallo	Frost Arena (2,012); Brookings, SD
January 27, 2024; 7:00 PM, SLN		South Dakota	W 81–57	9–13 (3–4)	21 – Petty	7 – Faas	5 – Diallo	Swinney Recreation Center (1,291); Kansas City, MO
February 1, 2024; 7:00 PM, SLN		Denver	W 85–71	10–13 (4–4)	25 – Andrews	8 – Ebonkoli	6 – Courseault	Swinney Recreation Center (1,042); Kansas City, MO
February 3, 2024; 7:00 PM, SLN		St. Thomas	L 56–71	10–14 (4–5)	15 – Brown	7 – Brown	3 – Diallo	Swinney Recreation Center (1,226); Kansas City, MO
February 8, 2024; 7:00 PM, SLN		at North Dakota State	L 78–82 ^{OT}	10–15 (4–6)	21 – Brown	6 – Brown	4 – Ebonkoli	Scheels Center (1,289); Fargo, ND
February 10, 2024; 1:00 PM, SLN		at North Dakota	W 65–47	11–15 (5–6)	17 – Petty	7 – Petty	5 – Courseault	Betty Engelstad Sioux Center (1,968); Grand Forks, ND
February 15, 2024; 7:00 PM, SLN		South Dakota State	W 72–67	12–15 (6–6)	17 – Courseault	10 – Brown	5 – Courseault	Swinney Recreation Center (1,507); Kansas City, MO
February 22, 2024; 7:00 PM, SLN		at South Dakota	W 82–78	13–15 (7–6)	27 – Brown	5 – Tied	10 – Courseault	Sanford Coyote Sports Center (1,560); Vermillion, SD
February 24, 2024; 7:00 PM, SLN		Omaha	W 63–58	14–15 (8–6)	22 – Brown	8 – Petty	5 – Diallo	Swinney Recreation Center (1,436); Kansas City, MO
February 29, 2024; 8:00 PM, SLN		at Denver	W 84–69	15–15 (9–6)	19 – Brown	11 – Brown	3 – Tied	Hamilton Gymnasium (1,060); Denver, CO
March 3, 2024; 2:00 PM, SLN		at Oral Roberts	W 71–54	16–15 (10–6)	14 – Tied	9 – Petty	6 – Courseault	Mabee Center (5,971); Tulsa, OK
Summit League tournament
March 9, 2024*; 8:30 PM, SLN	(2)	vs. (7) Denver; Quarterfinal	L 60–61	16–16	14 – Faas	7 – Courseault	2 – Tied	Denny Sanford Premier Center (9,121); Sioux Falls, SD
*Non-conference game. ^{#}Rankings from AP Poll. (#) Tournament seedings in parentheses. All times are in Central Standard Time (CST).
