= 2023–24 Omaha Mavericks men's basketball team =

American college basketball season

2023–24 Omaha Mavericks men's basketball
- Conference: Summit League
- Record: 15–18 (7–9 Summit)
- Head coach: Chris Crutchfield (2nd season)
- Assistant coaches: Kyan Brown; Kenya Crandell; Warren Niles
- Home arena: Baxter Arena

2023–24 Summit League men's basketball standings
	Conf.				Overall
Team	W		L	PCT	W		L	PCT
South Dakota State †	12	–	4	.750	22	–	13	.629
Kansas City	10	–	6	.625	16	–	16	.500
North Dakota	10	–	6	.625	18	–	14	.563
St. Thomas *	9	–	7	.563	20	–	13	.606
North Dakota State	8	–	8	.500	15	–	17	.469
Omaha	7	–	9	.438	15	–	18	.455
Denver	6	–	10	.375	17	–	17	.500
Oral Roberts	5	–	11	.313	12	–	19	.387
South Dakota	5	–	11	.313	12	–	20	.375
† 2024 Summit League tournament winner * Ineligible for the 2024 NCAA tournament due to transition from Division III

The 2023–24 Omaha Mavericks men's basketball team represented the University of Nebraska Omaha in the 2023–24 NCAA Division I men's basketball season. The Mavericks, led by second year head coach Chris Crutchfield, played their home games at Baxter Arena in Omaha, Nebraska as members of the Summit League. They finished the season 15–18, 7–9 in Summit League play to finish in sixth place. They upset North Dakota in the quarterfinals of the Summit League tournament before losing to Denver in the semifinals.

== Previous season ==
The Mavericks finished the 2022–23 season 9–23, 4–14 in Summit League play to finish in 10th place. They defeated Kansas City in the first round of the Summit League tournament before losing to South Dakota State in the quarterfinals.

== Roster ==
2023–24 Omaha Mavericks men's basketball team
Players
Coaches

Pos.	#	Name	Height	Weight	Year	Previous school	Hometown
F	0	Luke Jungers	6 ft 9 in (2.06 m)	220 lb (100 kg)	So	Creighton Preparatory School	Omaha, NE
G	1	JJ White	6 ft 2 in (1.88 m)	180 lb (82 kg)	Jr	Colby CC	Lawrencville, GA
G	2	Jaeden Marshall	6 ft 4 in (1.93 m)	205 lb (93 kg)	Jr	Bossier Parish CC	Hinesville, GA
G	3	Grant Stubblefield	6 ft 1 in (1.85 m)	180 lb (82 kg)	Fr	Blue Valley Northwest High School	Overland, KS
G	4	Sebastian Perry	6 ft 1 in (1.85 m)	170 lb (77 kg)	Fr	Heritage Hall School	Oklahoma City, OK
G	5	Ja'Sean Glover	6 ft 4 in (1.93 m)	205 lb (93 kg)	So	Madelia High School	Madelia, MN
F	10	Marquel Sutton	6 ft 8 in (2.03 m)	218 lb (99 kg)	Jr	Connors State	Tulsa, OK
G	11	Tucker Mills	6 ft 6 in (1.98 m)	185 lb (84 kg)	Fr	Lyons High School	Lyons, CO
G	12	Landon Braun	6 ft 6 in (1.98 m)	215 lb (98 kg)	Fr	Blue Valley Northwest High School	Overland, KS
F	14	Marcel Bryant	6 ft 7 in (2.01 m)	235 lb (107 kg)	Fr	Cedar Ridge High School	Round Rock, TX
F	21	Nick Davis	6 ft 9 in (2.06 m)	220 lb (100 kg)	Sr	Southern Nazarene	Arlington, TX
F	23	Frankie Fidler	6 ft 7 in (2.01 m)	205 lb (93 kg)	Jr	Bellevue West High School	Bellevue, NE
F	24	Jamal Ambrose	6 ft 10 in (2.08 m)	250 lb (113 kg)	RS Fr	Eastview High School	Apple Valley, MN
G	32	Tony Osburn	6 ft 1 in (1.85 m)	185 lb (84 kg)	So	Mound City High School	Fairfax, MO
C	33	Madelo Deng	7 ft 1 in (2.16 m)	220 lb (100 kg)	Fr	Omaha Central High School	Turalei, SOSU
G	45	Biko Johnson	6 ft 2 in (1.88 m)	180 lb (82 kg)	Jr	Western Nebraska CC	Carson, CA
C	55	Lincoln Palbicki	6 ft 9 in (2.06 m)	235 lb (107 kg)	Jr	Maple Grove High School	Maple Grove, MN

Head coach

- Chris Crutchfield (Omaha)

Assistant coach(es)

- Kyan Brown (Oral Roberts)
- Kenya Crandell (Nebraska–Kearney)
- Warren Niles (Oral Roberts)

Legend

- (C) Team captain
- (S) Suspended
- (I) Ineligible
- (W) Walk-on
- Injured
- Current redshirt

Roster
Last update: October 26, 2023

== Schedule and results ==
Date time, TV	Rank^{#}	Opponent^{#}	Result	Record	Site (attendance) city, state
Regular season
November 6, 2023*; 7:30 pm, SLN		Doane	W 85–53	1–0	Baxter Arena (1,609); Omaha, NE
November 9, 2023*; 7:00 pm, ESPN+		at TCU	L 60–82	1–1	Schollmaier Arena (5,885); Fort Worth, TX
November 11, 2023*; 7:00 pm, ESPN+		at North Texas	L 64–75	1–2	UNT Coliseum (3,533); Denton, TX
November 16, 2023*; 7:00 pm		vs. William & Mary; Air Force Multi-Team Event	W 89–83	2–2	Clune Arena (127); Colorado Springs, CO
November 17, 2023*; 2:00 pm		vs. Lindenwood; Air Force Multi-Team Event	L 70–72	2–3	Clune Arena (321); Colorado Springs, CO
November 19, 2023*; 2:00 pm		at Air Force	L 56–58	2–4	Clune Arena (1,466); Colorado Springs, CO
November 22, 2023*; 3:00 pm, SLN		Mid-America Christian	W 76–59	3–4	Baxter Arena (1,266); Omaha, NE
November 27, 2023*; 7:30 pm, SLN		York	W 104–68	4–4	Baxter Arena (819); Omaha, NE
November 30, 2023*; 12:05 pm, SLN		Bellevue	W 78–59	5–4	Baxter Arena (5,094); Omaha, NE
December 6, 2023*; 7:00 pm, ESPN+		at Texas Tech	L 58–87	5–5	United Supermarkets Arena (10,640); Lubbock, TX
December 9, 2023*; 3:30 pm, ESPN+		at Texas A&M–Corpus Christi	L 58–62	5–6	American Bank Center (1,161); Corpus Christi, TX
December 17, 2023*; 1:00 pm, SLN		Stetson	W 88–80	6–6	Baxter Arena (1,839); Omaha, NE
December 21, 2023*; 7:00 pm, ESPN+		at Cal Poly	L 53–66	6–7	Robert A. Mott Athletics Center (1,381); San Luis Obispo, CA
December 29, 2023; 7:00 pm, SLN		Denver	L 80–95	6–8 (0–1)	Baxter Arena (3,707); Omaha, NE
December 31, 2023; 1:00 pm, CBSSN		at South Dakota	W 67–51	7–8 (1–1)	Sanford Coyote Sports Center (1,710); Vermillion, SD
January 3, 2024*; 7:00 pm, SLN		Northern Arizona; Big Sky–Summit Challenge	W 81–55	8–8	Baxter Arena (1,240); Omaha, NE
January 6, 2024*; 6:00 pm		at Idaho State; Big Sky–Summit Challenge	L 62–63	8–9	Reed Gym (2,103); Pocatello, ID
January 11, 2024; 7:00 pm, SLN		North Dakota	W 79–61	9–9 (2–1)	Baxter Arena (870); Omaha, NE
January 13, 2023; 7:00 pm, SLN		North Dakota State	W 96–92 ^{OT}	10–9 (3–1)	Baxter Arena (1,047); Omaha, NE
January 18, 2024; 7:00 pm, SLN		at South Dakota State	L 87–90	10–10 (3–2)	Frost Arena (2,831); Brookings, SD
January 20, 2024; 12:05 pm, SLN		Kansas City	L 72–74	10–11 (3–3)	Baxter Arena (1,517); Omaha, NE
January 25, 2024; 7:00 pm, SLN		at Oral Roberts	L 67–74	10–12 (3–4)	Mabee Center (4,963); Tulsa, OK
January 27, 2024; 7:00 pm, SLN		at Denver	W 91–72	11–12 (4–4)	Hamilton Gymnasium (1,183); Denver, CO
February 1, 2024; 7:00 pm, SLN		St. Thomas	W 69–65	12–12 (5–4)	Baxter Arena (1,747); Omaha, NE
February 8, 2024; 7:00 pm, SLN		at North Dakota	L 78–99	12–13 (5–5)	Betty Engelstad Sioux Center (1,678); Grand Forks, ND
February 10, 2024; 1:00 pm, SLN		at North Dakota State	L 79–81	12–14 (5–6)	Scheels Center (2,204); Fargo, ND
February 15, 2024; 7:00 pm, SLN		South Dakota	W 91–84	13–14 (6–6)	Baxter Arena (2,472); Omaha, NE
February 17, 2024; 7:00 pm, SLN		South Dakota State	L 77–85 ^{OT}	13–15 (6–7)	Baxter Arena (3,778); Omaha, NE
February 22, 2024; 7:00 pm, SLN		Oral Roberts	W 71–70	14–15 (7–7)	Baxter Arena (2,106); Omaha, NE
February 24, 2024; 7:00 pm, SLN		at Kansas City	L 58–63	14–16 (7–8)	Swinney Recreation Center (1,436); Kansas City, MO
February 29, 2024; 7:00 pm, SLN		at St. Thomas	L 61–88	14–17 (7–9)	Schoenecker Arena (156); St. Paul, MN
Summit League tournament
March 10, 2024; 8:30 pm, SLN	(6)	vs. (3) North Dakota; Quarterfinals	W 73–72	15–17	Denny Sanford Premier Center (7,491); Sioux Falls, SD
March 11, 2024; 8:30 pm, SLN	(6)	vs. (7) Denver; Semifinals	L 63–66	15–18	Denny Sanford Premier Center (8,097); Sioux Falls, SD
*Non-conference game. ^{#}Rankings from AP Poll. (#) Tournament seedings in parentheses. All times are in Central.
