= 2023–24 St. Thomas Tommies (Minnesota) men's basketball team =

American college basketball season

2023–24 St. Thomas (Minnesota) Tommies men's basketball
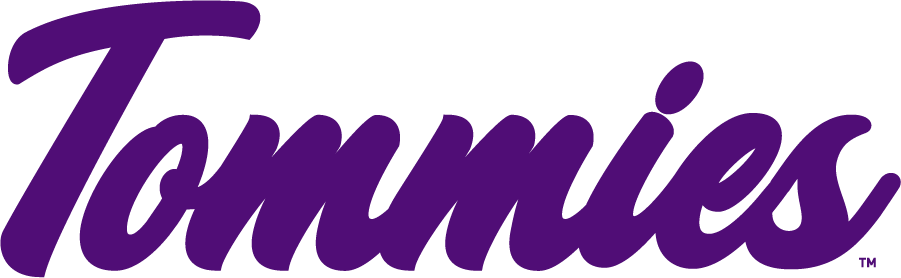
- Conference: Summit League
- Record: 20–13 (9–7 Summit)
- Head coach: John Tauer (13th season)
- Associate head coach: Mike Maker
- Assistant coaches: Cameron Rundles; Kenneth Lowe
- Home arena: Schoenecker Arena

2023–24 Summit League men's basketball standings
	Conf.				Overall
Team	W		L	PCT	W		L	PCT
South Dakota State †	12	–	4	.750	22	–	13	.629
Kansas City	10	–	6	.625	16	–	16	.500
North Dakota	10	–	6	.625	18	–	14	.563
St. Thomas *	9	–	7	.563	20	–	13	.606
North Dakota State	8	–	8	.500	15	–	17	.469
Omaha	7	–	9	.438	15	–	18	.455
Denver	6	–	10	.375	17	–	17	.500
Oral Roberts	5	–	11	.313	12	–	19	.387
South Dakota	5	–	11	.313	12	–	20	.375
† 2024 Summit League tournament winner * Ineligible for the 2024 NCAA tournament due to transition from Division III

The 2023–24 St. Thomas Tommies men's basketball team represented the University of St. Thomas in the 2023–24 NCAA Division I men's basketball season. The Tommies, led by 13th-year head coach John Tauer, played their home games at Schoenecker Arena in Saint Paul, Minnesota as members of the Summit League. They finished the season 20–13, 9–7 in Summit League play, to finish in fourth place.

This season marked St. Thomas's third year of a five-year transition period from Division III to Division I, an incredibly rare and historic jump that bypassed Division II altogether. As a result of this transition, the Tommies were not eligible for NCAA postseason play until 2026–27. The Tommies participated in their second-ever Summit League men's basketball tournament, defeating North Dakota State in the quarterfinals before falling to top-seeded South Dakota State in the semifinals.

== Previous season ==
The Tommies finished the 2022–23 season 19–14, 9–9 in Summit League play, to finish in a tie for fourth place. Since the Summit League expanded the Summit League men's basketball tournament to include all league teams, St. Thomas played in their first Division I postseason tournament. They defeated Western Illinois in the quarterfinals, and lost to Oral Roberts in the semifinals.

== Roster ==
2023–24 St. Thomas (Minnesota) Tommies men's basketball team
Players
Coaches

Pos.	#	Name	Height	Weight	Year	Previous school	Hometown
G	1	Kendall Blue	6 ft 6 in (1.98 m)	190 lb (86 kg)	So	East Ridge High School	Woodbury, MN
G	2	Ben Nau	6 ft 2 in (1.88 m)	190 lb (86 kg)	Jr	Brookfield Central High School	Brookfield, WI
G	3	Hayden Tibbits	5 ft 11 in (1.8 m)	165 lb (75 kg)	Fr	Wayzata High School	Medina, MN
F	4	Brooks Allen	6 ft 7 in (2.01 m)	210 lb (95 kg)	GS	Shakopee High School	Shakopee, MN
F	5	Parker Bjorklund	6 ft 7 in (2.01 m)	200 lb (91 kg)	GS	Chaska High School	Chaska, MN
G	11	Drake Dobbs	6 ft 2 in (1.88 m)	175 lb (79 kg)	Sr	Eden Prairie High School	Eden Prairie, MN
G	12	Ryan Dufault	6 ft 0 in (1.83 m)	185 lb (84 kg)	Jr	Waseca High School	Waseca, MN
F	13	Ahjany Lee	6 ft 9 in (2.06 m)	215 lb (98 kg)	So	Totino-Grace High School	Byron, MN
G	14	Adam Tauer	6 ft 3 in (1.91 m)	175 lb (79 kg)	Fr	Cretin-Derham Hall High School	St. Paul, MN
F	20	Courtney Jr. Brown	6 ft 7 in (2.01 m)	215 lb (98 kg)	Sr	East Ridge High School	Cottage Grove, MN
G	21	Ben Oosterbaan	6 ft 6 in (1.98 m)	195 lb (88 kg)	Fr	Hinsdale Central High School	Hinsdale, IL
G	24	Raheem Anthony	6 ft 4 in (1.93 m)	220 lb (100 kg)	GS	DePaul College Prep	Chicago, IL
G	32	Dom Martinelli	6 ft 4 in (1.93 m)	195 lb (88 kg)	Sr	Glenbrook South High School	Glenview, IL
F	33	Bennett Kwiecinski	6 ft 9 in (2.06 m)	205 lb (93 kg)	Sr	Loyola Academy	Chicago, IL
F	35	Carter Bjerke	6 ft 9 in (2.06 m)	250 lb (113 kg)	RS Fr	Wayzata High School	Plymouth, MN

Head coach

- John Tauer (St. Thomas (MN))

Assistant coach(es)

- Mike Maker (Cal Baptist)
- Cameron Rundles (Wofford)
- Kenneth Lowe (Purdue)

Legend

- (C) Team captain
- (S) Suspended
- (I) Ineligible
- (W) Walk-on
- Injured
- Current redshirt

Roster
Last update: October 30, 2023

== Schedule and results ==
Date time, TV	Rank^{#}	Opponent^{#}	Result	Record	High points	High rebounds	High assists	Site (attendance) city, state
Regular season
November 6, 2023*; 8:00 p.m., P12N		at California	L 66–71	0–1	17 – Allen	5 – Blue	3 – 2 tied	Haas Pavilion (3,066); Berkeley, CA
November 10, 2023*; 7:30 p.m., Fox 9+/SLN		Idaho State	W 54–53	1–1	21 – Bjorklund	12 – Bjorklund	3 – Anthony	Schoenecker Arena (1,610); St. Paul, MN
November 12, 2023*; 4:00 p.m., SLN		North Central (MN)	W 100–54	2–1	14 – Bjerke	6 – 2 tied	4 – Dufault	Schoenecker Arena (757); St. Paul, MN
November 17, 2023*; 6:30 p.m.		vs. Cal Poly; The Lancer Joust	L 60–61	2–2	22 – Bjorklund	4 – Blue	2 – Blue	Fowler Events Center (141); Riverside, CA
November 18, 2023*; 7:00 p.m., ESPN+		at California Baptist; The Lancer Joust	L 62–66	2–3	17 – Bjorklund	6 – 2 tied	3 – 2 tied	Fowler Events Center (2,034); Riverside, CA
November 19, 2023*; 4:30 p.m.		vs. Portland State; The Lancer Joust	W 76–70	3–3	22 – Blue	8 – Bjorklund	4 – Bjorklund	Fowler Events Center (123); Riverside, CA
November 25, 2023*; 2:00 p.m., ESPN+		at Green Bay	L 51–64	3–4	18 – Anthony	4 – 2 tied	4 – Anthony	Resch Center (1,618); Green Bay, WI
December 1, 2023*; 4:00 p.m.		at Western Michigan	W 66–51	4–4	22 – Bjorklund	7 – Anthony	5 – Dobbs	University Arena (1,411); Kalamazoo, MI
December 6, 2023*; 7:00 p.m., SLN		Milwaukee	W 75–71	5–4	23 – Anthony	6 – Anthony	– 3 tied	Schoenecker Arena (1,316); St. Paul, MN
December 10, 2023*; 2:00 p.m.		at Chicago State	W 66–50	6–4	17 – 2 tied	5 – Anthony	8 – Anthony	Jones Convocation Center (127); Chicago, IL
December 14, 2023*; 7:00 p.m., FS1		at No. 7 Marquette	L 79–84	6–5	14 – Dobbs	6 – Nau	4 – Dobbs	Fiserv Forum (14,950); Milwaukee, WI
December 17, 2023*; 2:00 p.m., SLN		Crown College	W 85–66	7–5	25 – Bjorklund	9 – Blue	4 – 2 tied	Schoenecker Arena (744); St. Paul, MN
December 21, 2023*; 7:00 p.m., SLN		Wisconsin–River Falls	W 104–51	8–5	14 – Lee	7 – Bjorklund	7 – Dufault	Shoenecker Arena (937); St. Paul, MN
December 29, 2023; 7:00 p.m., CBSSN		at North Dakota	W 70–45	9–5 (1–0)	21 – Bjorklund	9 – Anthony	5 – Blue	Betty Engelstad Sioux Center (1,637); Grand Forks, ND
December 31, 2023; 2:00 p.m., SLN		Kansas City	W 77–56	10–5 (2–0)	17 – Anthony	8 – Allen	4 – 2 tied	Schoenecker Arena (1,165); St. Paul, MN
January 3, 2024*; 7:00 p.m., ESPN+		at Idaho; Big Sky–Summit Challenge	W 75–67	11–5	16 – Dobbs	6 – Anthony	6 – Dobbs	ICCU Arena (1,286); Moscow, ID
January 6, 2024*; 7:00 p.m., Fox 9+/SLN		Sacramento State; Big Sky–Summit Challenge	W 63–50	12–5	13 – Bjorklund	4 – 3 tied	3 – Dufault	Schoenecker Arena (1,306); St. Paul, MN
January 11, 2024; 7:00 p.m., SLN		South Dakota State	L 80–81	12–6 (2–1)	21 – Anthony	5 – Allen	4 – Allen	Schoenecker Arena (1,515); St. Paul, MN
January 13, 2024; 7:00 p.m., SLN		at Oral Roberts	W 87–76	13–6 (3–1)	17 – Dobbs	7 – 2 tied	3 – 2 tied	Mabee Center (4,652); Tulsa, OK
January 18, 2024; 7:00 p.m., SLN		at South Dakota	L 73–74 ^{OT}	13–7 (3–2)	17 – Bjorklund	7 – Bjorklund	5 – Anthony	Sanford Coyote Sports Center (1,737); Vermillion, SD
January 25, 2024; 7:00 p.m., SLN		North Dakota State	W 79–66	14–7 (4–2)	32 – Bjorklund	9 – Bjorklund	2 – 4 tied	Schoenecker Arena (1,614); St. Paul, MN
January 27, 2024; 7:00 p.m., SLN		North Dakota	L 64–74	14–8 (4–3)	32 – Anthony	8 – Anthony	2 – 3 tied	Schoenecker Arena (1,540); St. Paul, MN
February 1, 2024; 7:00 p.m., SLN		at Omaha	L 65–69	14–9 (4–4)	20 – Bjorklund	6 – Anthony	4 – 2 tied	Baxter Arena (1,747); Omaha, NE
February 3, 2024; 7:00 p.m., SLN		at Kansas City	W 71–56	15–9 (5–4)	16 – 2 tied	6 – Blue	4 – Dobbs	Swinney Recreation Center (1,226); Kansas City, MO
February 8, 2024; 7:00 p.m., SLN		Oral Roberts	W 85–63	16–9 (6–4)	19 – Bjorklund	7 – Bjorklund	6 – Anthony	Schoenecker Arena (1,148); St. Paul, MN
February 10, 2024; 3:00 p.m., SLN		at Denver	L 77–94	16–10 (6–5)	18 – Allen	7 – Lee	2 – 2 tied	Hamilton Gymnasium (1,028); Denver, CO
February 17, 2024; 7:00 p.m., Fox 9+/SLN		South Dakota	W 83–80	17–10 (7–5)	20 – Anthony	11 – Bjorklund	8 – Anthony	Schoenecker Arena (1,509); St. Paul, MN
February 22, 2024; 7:00 p.m., SLN		at North Dakota State	L 50–64	17–11 (7–6)	11 – Bjorklund	5 – Anthony	3 – Anthony	Scheels Center (1,579); Fargo, ND
February 24, 2024; 2:00 p.m., SLN		at South Dakota State	L 72–77	17–12 (7–7)	16 – 2 tied	6 – Anthony	4 – Anthony	Frost Arena (3,136); Brookings, SD
February 29, 2024; 7:00 p.m., SLN		Omaha	W 88–61	18–12 (8–7)	15 – Anthony	11 – Blue	6 – Anthony	Schoenecker Arena (1,526); St. Paul, MN
March 2, 2024; 7:00 p.m., SLN		Denver	W 83–58	19–12 (9–7)	17 – Bjorklund	7 – 2 tied	6 – Anthony	Schoenecker Arena (1,607); St. Paul, MN
Summit League tournament
March 10, 2024; 6:00 p.m., SLN	(4)	vs. (5) North Dakota State; Quarterfinals	W 68–58	20–12	15 – Blue	7 – Anthony	3 – Dobbs	Denny Sanford Premier Center; Sioux Falls, SD
March 11, 2024; 6:00 p.m., SLN	(4)	vs. (1) South Dakota State; Semifinals	L 49–59	20–13	13 – Blue	9 – Anthony	4 – Anthony	Denny Sanford Premier Center; Sioux Falls, SD
*Non-conference game. ^{#}Rankings from AP poll. (#) Tournament seedings in parentheses. All times are in Central.
