= 2023–24 North Dakota Fighting Hawks men's basketball team =

American college basketball season

2023–24 North Dakota Fighting Hawks men's basketball
- Conference: Summit League
- Record: 18–14 (10–6 The Summit)
- Head coach: Paul Sather (5th season)
- Assistant coaches: Jamie Stevens; Randall Herbst; Steven Aldridge
- Home arena: Betty Engelstad Sioux Center

2023–24 Summit League men's basketball standings
	Conf.				Overall
Team	W		L	PCT	W		L	PCT
South Dakota State †	12	–	4	.750	22	–	13	.629
Kansas City	10	–	6	.625	16	–	16	.500
North Dakota	10	–	6	.625	18	–	14	.563
St. Thomas *	9	–	7	.563	20	–	13	.606
North Dakota State	8	–	8	.500	15	–	17	.469
Omaha	7	–	9	.438	15	–	18	.455
Denver	6	–	10	.375	17	–	17	.500
Oral Roberts	5	–	11	.313	12	–	19	.387
South Dakota	5	–	11	.313	12	–	20	.375
† 2024 Summit League tournament winner * Ineligible for the 2024 NCAA tournament due to transition from Division III

The 2023–24 North Dakota Fighting Hawks men's basketball team represented the University of North Dakota in the 2023–24 NCAA Division I men's basketball season. They were led by fifth-year head coach Paul Sather and played their home games at the Betty Engelstad Sioux Center in Grand Forks, North Dakota as members of the Summit League.

The Fighting Hawks finished the season 18–14, 10–6 in Summit League play, to finish in a tie for second place. In the Summit League tournament, they lost to Omaha in the quarterfinals.

== Previous season ==
The Fighting Hawks finished the 2022–23 season 13–20, 6–12 in Summit League play to finish in a tie for seventh place. In the Summit League tournament, the Fighting Hawks defeated Denver in the first round and lost to Oral Roberts in the quarterfinals.

== Roster ==
2023–24 North Dakota Fighting Hawks men's basketball team
Players
Coaches

Pos.	#	Name	Height	Weight	Year	Hometown
G	0	Zach Kraft	6 ft 2 in (1.88 m)	180 lb (82 kg)	Fr	Grand Forks, ND
G	1	Elijah Brooks	6 ft 4 in (1.93 m)	195 lb (88 kg)	So	Topeka, KS
G	2	Eli King	6 ft 4 in (1.93 m)	190 lb (86 kg)	So	Caledonia, MN
F/C	3	Amar Kuljuhovic	6 ft 8 in (2.03 m)	225 lb (102 kg)	Jr	Waterloo, IA
G	4	Tyree Ihenacho	6 ft 4 in (1.93 m)	190 lb (86 kg)	Jr	Prior Lake, MN
F	5	Deng Mayar	6 ft 8 in (2.03 m)	180 lb (82 kg)	Jr	Salt Lake City, UT
F	10	Tsotne Tsartsidze	6 ft 9 in (2.06 m)	235 lb (107 kg)	GS	Tbilisi, Georgia
G	11	Daniel Hong	6 ft 2 in (1.88 m)	175 lb (79 kg)	RS Fr	South Barrington, IL
F	12	Brian Mathews	6 ft 10 in (2.08 m)	240 lb (109 kg)	Jr	Chicago, IL
F/C	14	Ryan Erikson	6 ft 10 in (2.08 m)	250 lb (113 kg)	Fr	Bismarck, ND
F	15	Brady Danielson	6 ft 4 in (1.93 m)	205 lb (93 kg)	GS	York, NE
F	20	B.J. Omot	6 ft 8 in (2.03 m)	185 lb (84 kg)	So	Mankato, MN
F	21	Mambourou Mara	6 ft 6 in (1.98 m)	190 lb (86 kg)	Fr	Conakry, Guinea
F	22	Matthew Bothun	6 ft 9 in (2.06 m)	200 lb (91 kg)	Fr	St. Francis, MN
G	33	Anthony Doppler	6 ft 4 in (1.93 m)	185 lb (84 kg)	Fr	Bismarck, ND
G	52	Treysen Eaglestaff	6 ft 6 in (1.98 m)	190 lb (86 kg)	So	Bismarck, ND

Head coach

- Paul Sather

Assistant coach(es)

- Jamie Stevens
- Randall Herbst
- Estevan Sandoval

Legend

- (C) Team captain
- (S) Suspended
- (I) Ineligible
- (W) Walk-on
- Injured
- Current redshirt

Roster
Last update: October 26, 2023

== Schedule and results ==
Date time, TV	Rank^{#}	Opponent^{#}	Result	Record	Site (attendance) city, state
Exhibition
November 1, 2023*; 7:00 p.m., SLN		Northland	W 107–48	–	Betty Engelstad Sioux Center (613); Grand Forks, ND
Non-conference regular season
November 7, 2023*; 7:00 p.m., B1G+		at Iowa	L 68–110	0–1	Carver-Hawkeye Arena (7,653); Iowa City, IA
November 12, 2023*; 1:00 p.m., SLN		Elon	W 85–68	1–1	Betty Engelstad Sioux Center (1,291); Grand Forks, ND
November 16, 2023*; 7:00 p.m., SLN		Valley City State	W 93–63	2–1	Betty Engelstad Sioux Center (1,396); Grand Forks, ND
November 20, 2023*; 10:00 p.m., ESPN+		at Pacific	W 73–71	3–1	Alex G. Spanos Center (799); Stockton, CA
November 25, 2023*; 2:00 p.m.		vs. New Orleans; Central Arkansas Classic	W 71–69 ^{OT}	4–1	Farris Center (105); Conway, AR
November 26, 2023*; 12:00 p.m.		vs. Eastern Michigan; Central Arkansas Classic	W 72–70	5–1	Farris Center (98); Conway, AR
November 28, 2023*; 7:00 p.m., SLN		Concordia–Moorhead	W 87–56	6–1	Betty Engelstad Sioux Center (1,693); Grand Forks, ND
December 1, 2023*; 8:00 p.m., ESPN+		at Cal State Fullerton	L 54–64	6–2	Titan Gym (908); Fullerton, CA
December 3, 2023*; 6:00 p.m., ESPN+		at UC Riverside	L 62–68	6–3	Student Recreation Center Arena (261); Riverside, CA
December 9, 2023*; 1:00 p.m., SLN		Portland	L 72–83	6–4	Betty Engelstad Sioux Center (1,501); Grand Forks, ND
December 12, 2023*; 7:00 p.m., SLN		Waldorf	W 87–36	7–4	Betty Engelstad Sioux Center (1,273); Grand Forks, ND
December 16, 2023*; 8:00 p.m., ESPN+		at Utah Tech	W 79–62	8–4	Burns Arena (1,176); St. George, UT
December 20, 2023*; 6:30 p.m., B1G+		at Nebraska	L 75–83	8–5	Pinnacle Bank Arena (13,387); Lincoln, NE
Summit League regular season
December 29, 2023; 7:00 p.m., CBSSN		St. Thomas (MN)	L 45–70	8–6 (0–1)	Betty Engelstad Sioux Center (1,637); Grand Forks, ND
December 31, 2023; 2:00 p.m., SLN		at South Dakota State	L 61–80	8–7 (0–2)	Frost Arena (3,029); Brookings, SD
Non-conference regular season
January 3, 2024*; 7:00 p.m., SLN		Northern Colorado	L 87–97	8–8	Betty Engelstad Sioux Center (1,365); Grand Forks, ND
January 6, 2024*; 2:00 p.m.		at Northern Arizona	L 73–74	8–9	Walkup Skydome; Flagstaff, AZ
Summit League regular season
January 11, 2024; 7:00 p.m., SLN		at Omaha	L 61–79	8–10 (0–3)	Baxter Arena (870); Omaha, NE
January 13, 2024; 7:00 p.m., SLN		at Kansas City	W 82–69	9–10 (1–3)	Swinney Recreation Center (575); Kansas City, MO
January 18, 2024; 7:00 p.m., SLN		Oral Roberts	W 87–77	10–10 (2–3)	Betty Engelstad Sioux Center (1,659); Grand Forks, ND
January 20, 2024; 12:00 p.m., SLN		Denver	W 92–78	11–10 (3–3)	Betty Engelstad Sioux Center (1,500); Grand Forks, ND
January 27, 2024; 7:00 p.m., SLN		at St. Thomas	W 74–64	12–10 (4–3)	Schoenecker Arena (1,540); St. Paul, MN
February 1, 2024; 7:00 p.m., SLN		at South Dakota	W 95–81	13–10 (5–3)	Sanford Coyote Sports Center (1,775); Vermillion, SD
February 3, 2024; 3:30 p.m., SLN		North Dakota State	W 60–58	14–10 (6–3)	Betty Engelstad Sioux Center (3,065); Grand Forks, ND
February 8, 2024; 7:00 p.m., SLN		Omaha	W 99–78	15–10 (7–3)	Betty Engelstad Sioux Center (1,678); Grand Forks, ND
February 10, 2024; 1:00 p.m., SLN		Kansas City	L 47–65	15–11 (7–4)	Betty Engelstad Sioux Center (1,968); Grand Forks, ND
February 15, 2024; 8:00 p.m., SLN		at Denver	W 92–78	16–11 (8–4)	Hamilton Gymnasium (852); Denver, CO
February 17, 2024; 7:00 p.m., SLN		at Oral Roberts	W 78–65	17–11 (9–4)	Mabee Center (6,074); Tulsa, OK
February 24, 2024; 1:00 p.m., CBSSN		at North Dakota State	L 68–73	17–12 (9–5)	Scheels Center (5,058); Fargo, ND
February 29, 2024; 7:00 p.m., SLN		South Dakota State	L 62–72	17–13 (9–6)	Betty Engelstad Sioux Center (2,075); Grand Forks, ND
March 2, 2024; 1:00 p.m., SLN		South Dakota	W 95–66	18–13 (10–6)	Betty Engelstad Sioux Center (1,759); Grand Forks, ND
Summit League tournament
March 10, 2024; 8:30 p.m., CBSSN/SLN	(3)	vs. (6) Omaha; Quarterfinals	L 72–73	18–14	Denny Sanford Premier Center (7,491); Sioux Falls, SD
*Non-conference game. ^{#}Rankings from AP poll. (#) Tournament seedings in parentheses. All times are in Central.
