= 2023–24 South Dakota Coyotes men's basketball team =

American college basketball season

2023–24 South Dakota Coyotes men's basketball
- Conference: Summit League
- Record: 12–20 (5–11 Summit)
- Head coach: Eric Peterson (2nd season)
- Assistant coaches: Patrick Eberhart; Casey Kasperbauer; Brandon Ubel
- Home arena: Sanford Coyote Sports Center

2023–24 Summit League men's basketball standings
	Conf.				Overall
Team	W		L	PCT	W		L	PCT
South Dakota State †	12	–	4	.750	22	–	13	.629
Kansas City	10	–	6	.625	16	–	16	.500
North Dakota	10	–	6	.625	18	–	14	.563
St. Thomas *	9	–	7	.563	20	–	13	.606
North Dakota State	8	–	8	.500	15	–	17	.469
Omaha	7	–	9	.438	15	–	18	.455
Denver	6	–	10	.375	17	–	17	.500
Oral Roberts	5	–	11	.313	12	–	19	.387
South Dakota	5	–	11	.313	12	–	20	.375
† 2024 Summit League tournament winner * Ineligible for the 2024 NCAA tournament due to transition from Division III

The 2023–24 South Dakota Coyotes men's basketball team represented the University of South Dakota in the 2023–24 NCAA Division I men's basketball season. The Coyotes were led by second-year head coach Eric Peterson, and played their home games at the Sanford Coyote Sports Center in Vermillion, South Dakota as members of the Summit League.

== Previous season ==
The Coyotes finished the 2022–23 season 12–19, 7–11 in Summit League play to finish in sixth place. The Coyotes would lose to North Dakota State in the quarterfinals of the Summit League tournament.

== Roster ==
2023–24 South Dakota Coyotes men's basketball team
Players
Coaches

Pos.	#	Name	Height	Weight	Year	Hometown
F	0	Mayuom Buom	6 ft 10 in (2.08 m)	—	Jr	Lincoln, NE
G	1	Kaleb Stewart	6 ft 3 in (1.91 m)	—	Jr	Houston, TX
G	2	Shey Eberwein	6 ft 5 in (1.96 m)	—	Fr	The Woodlands, TX
G	3	Max Burchill	6 ft 4 in (1.93 m)	—	Jr	Sioux Falls, SD
G	5	Bostyn Holt	6 ft 7 in (2.01 m)	—	Sr	Portland, OR
G	12	Isaac Bruns	6 ft 4 in (1.93 m)	—	Fr	North Sioux City, SD
F	15	Jevon Hill	6 ft 9 in (2.06 m)	—	RS Fr	Wichita, KS
F	21	Jake Brack	6 ft 9 in (2.06 m)	—	Fr	Omaha, NE
G	22	Jamil Safieddine	6 ft 6 in (1.98 m)	—	Jr	Denver, CO
G	23	Paul Bruns	6 ft 4 in (1.93 m)	—	Jr	North Sioux City, SD
G	24	Steven Kramer	6 ft 6 in (1.98 m)	—	RS Fr	Johnston, IA
G	25	Jalen Hayes	6 ft 2 in (1.88 m)	—	Fr	Richfield, MN
F	33	Felix Broström	6 ft 8 in (2.03 m)	—	So	Gothenburg, SWE
F	34	Lahat Thioune	6 ft 10 in (2.08 m)	—	Sr	Dakar, SEN
F	45	Miles Branch	6 ft 9 in (2.06 m)	—	So	Lawrence, KS
G	55	Jeremiah Coleman	6 ft 0 in (1.83 m)	—	So	Parker, CO

Head coach

- Eric Peterson (UW–La Crosse)

Assistant coach(es)

- Patrick Eberhart (Adams State)
- Casey Kasperbauer (South Dakota)
- Brandon Ubel (Nebraska)

Legend

- (C) Team captain
- (S) Suspended
- (I) Ineligible
- (W) Walk-on
- Injured
- Current redshirt

Roster
Last update: October 31, 2023

== Schedule and results ==
Date time, TV	Rank^{#}	Opponent^{#}	Result	Record	Site (attendance) city, state
Regular season
November 6, 2023*; 8:00 pm, SLN		Mount Marty	W 85–53	1–0	Sanford Coyote Sports Center (2302); Vermillion, SD
November 10, 2023*; 7:00 pm, SLN		vs. UTRGV	W 100–79	2–0	Sanford Pentagon (1884); Sioux Falls, SD
November 14, 2023*; 8:00 pm, FS2		at DePaul	L 60–72	2–1	Wintrust Arena (2,434); Chicago, IL
November 17, 2023*; 1:00 pm		vs. VMI; Arizona Tip-Off (Desert Division) First Round	W 85–81	3–1	Desert Diamond Arena; Glendale, AZ
November 18, 2023*; 3:30 p.m.		vs. Purdue Fort Wayne; Arizona Tip-Off (Desert Division) Championship	L 81–93	3–2	Desert Diamond Arena (1,211); Glendale, AZ
November 22, 2023*; 1:00 pm, SLN		Northland College	W 100–48	4–2	Sanford Coyote Sports Center (1,274); Vermillion, SD
November 26, 2023*; 12:30 pm, MidcoSN/SLN		Air Force	L 57–58	4–3	Sanford Coyote Sports Center (1,633); Vermillion, SD
November 28, 2023*; 7:00 pm, SLN		Waldorf	W 93–71	5–3	Sanford Coyote Sports Center (1,384); Vermillion, SD
December 3, 2023*; 1:00 pm, ESPN+		at Western Illinois	W 70–68	6–3	Western Hall (693); Macomb, IL
December 9, 2023*; 1:00 pm, SLN		CSU Bakersfield	W 78–73	7–3	Sanford Coyote Sports Center (1,652); Vermillion, SD
December 16, 2023*; 9:00 pm, ESPN+		at UC Irvine	L 78–121	7–4	Bren Events Center (1,923); Irvine, CA
December 19, 2023*; 9:00 pm, ESPN+		at CSU Bakersfield	L 76–96	7–5	Icardo Center (876); Bakersfield, CA
December 21, 2023*; 9:00 pm, ESPN+		at San Diego	L 66–69	7–6	Jenny Craig Pavilion (525); San Diego, CA
December 29, 2023; 7:00 pm, SLN		at North Dakota State	W 75–66	8–6 (1–0)	Scheels Center (2,674); Fargo, ND
December 31, 2023; 2:00 pm, CBSSN		Omaha	L 51–67	8–7 (1–1)	Sanford Coyote Sports Center (1,710); Vermillion, SD
January 3, 2024*; 7:00 pm, MidcoSN2/SLN		Eastern Washington; Big Sky–Summit Challenge	L 79–93	8–8	Sanford Coyote Sports Center (1,424); Vermillion, SD
January 6, 2024*; 8:00 pm, ESPN+		at Montana; Big Sky–Summit Challenge	L 63–82	8–9	Dahlberg Arena (2,864); Missoula, MT
January 11, 2024; 7:00 pm, SLN		at Oral Roberts	L 66–84	8–10 (1–2)	Mabee Center (3,517); Tulsa, OK
January 18, 2024; 7:00 pm, MidcoSN2/SLN		St. Thomas	W 74–73 ^{OT}	9–10 (2–2)	Sanford Coyote Sports Center (1,737); Vermillion, SD
January 20, 2024; 1:00 pm, MidcoSN/SLN		South Dakota State	L 55–73	9–11 (2–3)	Sanford Coyote Sports Center (3,892); Vermillion, SD
January 25, 2024; 8:00 pm, SLN		at Denver	L 110–111 ^{2OT}	9–12 (2–4)	Hamilton Gymnasium (1,278); Denver, CO
January 27, 2024; 7:00 pm, SLN		at Kansas City	L 57–81	9–13 (2–5)	Swinney Recreation Center (1,291); Kansas City, MO
February 1, 2024; 7:00 pm, MidcoSN/SLN		North Dakota	L 81–95	9–14 (2–6)	Sanford Coyote Sports Center (1,775); Vermillion, SD
February 4, 2024; 4:00 pm, CBSSN		at South Dakota State	L 67–70	9–15 (2–7)	Frost Arena (3,781); Brookings, SD
February 8, 2024; 7:00 pm, MidcoSN2/SLN		Denver	W 92–86 ^{OT}	10–15 (3–7)	Sanford Coyote Sports Center (1,640); Vermillion, SD
February 15, 2024; 7:00 pm, SLN		at Omaha	L 84–91	10–16 (3–8)	Baxter Arena (2,472); Omaha, NE
February 17, 2024; 7:00 pm, SLN		at St. Thomas	L 80–83	10–17 (3–9)	Schoenecker Arena (1,509); St. Paul, MN
February 22, 2024; 7:00 pm, MidcoSN/SLN		Kansas City	L 78–82	10–18 (3–10)	Sanford Coyote Sports Center (1,560); Vermillion, SD
February 24, 2024; 1:00 pm, SLN		Oral Roberts	W 77–76	11–18 (4–10)	Sanford Coyote Sports Center (1,887); Vermillion, SD
February 29, 2024; 7:00 pm, SLN		North Dakota State	W 88–68	12–18 (5–10)	Sanford Coyote Sports Center (1,717); Vermillion, SD
March 2, 2024; 1:00 pm, MidcoSN2/SLN		at North Dakota	L 66–95	12–19 (5–11)	Betty Engelstad Sioux Center (1,759); Grand Forks, ND
Summit League tournament
March 8, 2024; 7:00 pm, SLN	(9)	vs. (8) Oral Roberts; First round	L 62–77	12–20	Denny Sanford Premier Center (7,611); Sioux Falls, SD
*Non-conference game. ^{#}Rankings from AP Poll. (#) Tournament seedings in parentheses. All times are in Central.
