= Edward F. Swinney =

Edward Fletcher Swinney (August 1, 1857 – October 24, 1946) was an American prominent businessman and banker. Swinney served as president of the American Bankers Association and later as president of the First National Bank of Kansas City (now a part of the Bank of America). Swinney served on the Kansas City School Board from 1894 until 1918.

Swinney was also a philanthropist who created, in 1944, the Edward F. Swinney Trust whose mission is "to be used for the furtherance and development of such public charitable and public educational purposes in the State of Missouri". The Swinney Recreation Center bears his name.

== Early life ==
Swinney was born in Marysville, Virginia on August 1, 1857. He attended Virginia Agricultural and Mechanical College from 1872–1875.

== Career ==
Swinney moved to Fayette, Missouri shortly after graduating university to pursue a career in banking. In Fayette, Swinney was hired as a grocery delivery boy, which consisted of long hours and pay of $20 a week. Despite these strenuous working conditions, he kept a positive attitude and developed a work ethic that would attribute to his future successes. After working for the grocery store for about five years, he got a job working for a dry goods store, which gave him a $5 pay raise.

On August 15, 1878, Swinney was given the opportunity to work at a bank in Fayette, which launched his career as a successful banker. Swinney worked at the Fayette Bank for four years before he accepted a higher position in Rich Hill, Missouri. Eventually, he was offered the position to become a cashier at their new location in Colorado City, Texas.

Swinney returned to Missouri on March 1, 1887, where he became a cashier at the First National Bank in Kansas City, Missouri. He was elected president of the First National Bank in 1890. Swnney quickly built a reputable and respected name for himself within the financial community.

== Philanthropy ==
Swinney was a philanthropist and was involved in many local organizations. He was particularly interested in public education, and he sat on the Kansas City Board of Education from 1894 until 1918. He also funded the Edward F. Swinney Trust, which helps develop public charitable and educational projects in Missouri.

== Personal life ==
Swinney married his wife, Ida Lee, in Howard County, Missouri on November 14, 1882. The couple had two children, Edna S and Lee Thomson, who were both adopted. Swinney died in his apartment at 8:45am following weeks of health complications.
