= 2023–24 Denver Pioneers men's basketball team =

American college basketball season

2023–24 Denver Pioneers men's basketball
- Conference: Summit League
- Record: 17–17 (6–10 The Summit)
- Head coach: Jeff Wulbrun (3rd season)
- Assistant coaches: Rob Zewe; Rob Williams; Jerry Brown
- Home arena: Hamilton Gymnasium

2023–24 Summit League men's basketball standings
	Conf.				Overall
Team	W		L	PCT	W		L	PCT
South Dakota State †	12	–	4	.750	22	–	13	.629
Kansas City	10	–	6	.625	16	–	16	.500
North Dakota	10	–	6	.625	18	–	14	.563
St. Thomas *	9	–	7	.563	20	–	13	.606
North Dakota State	8	–	8	.500	15	–	17	.469
Omaha	7	–	9	.438	15	–	18	.455
Denver	6	–	10	.375	17	–	17	.500
Oral Roberts	5	–	11	.313	12	–	19	.387
South Dakota	5	–	11	.313	12	–	20	.375
† 2024 Summit League tournament winner * Ineligible for the 2024 NCAA tournament due to transition from Division III

The 2023–24 Denver Pioneers men's basketball team represented the University of Denver in the 2023-24 NCAA Division I men's basketball season. The Pioneers, led by third-year head coach Jeff Wulbrun, played their home games at Hamilton Gymnasium in Denver, Colorado as members of the Summit League.

== Previous season ==
The Pioneers finished the 2022–23 season 15–17, 6–12 in Summit League play to finish in a tie for eighth place. They were defeated by North Dakota in the first round of the Summit League tournament.

== Roster ==
2023–24 Denver Pioneers men's basketball team
Players
Coaches

Pos.	#	Name	Height	Weight	Year	Hometown
G	0	Tommy Bruner	6 ft 1 in (1.85 m)	180 lb (82 kg)	Sr	Columbia, SC
G	1	Dan Mukuna	6 ft 8 in (2.03 m)	195 lb (88 kg)	So	Dortmund, GER
G	2	Devin Carney	6 ft 1 in (1.85 m)	180 lb (82 kg)	RS Fr	Butler, PA
G	4	DeAndre Craig	6 ft 0 in (1.83 m)	170 lb (77 kg)	Fr	Chicago, IL
G	10	Keean Lloyd	6 ft 4 in (1.93 m)	190 lb (86 kg)	Fr	Aurora, CO
G	11	Carlos Fuentes	6 ft 6 in (1.98 m)	195 lb (88 kg)	RS Jr	Alicante, ESP
G	13	Josh Lee	6 ft 3 in (1.91 m)	185 lb (84 kg)	So	Canton, MS
G	14	Drake Muller	6 ft 4 in (1.93 m)	205 lb (93 kg)	RS Jr	Cedar Hill, Texas
F	15	Pedro Lopez-Sanvicente	6 ft 8 in (2.03 m)	220 lb (100 kg)	Jr	Canary Islands, ESP
G	21	Tyson Garff	6 ft 6 in (1.98 m)	205 lb (93 kg)	Jr	Kaysville, UT
G	23	Jaxon Brenchley	6 ft 5 in (1.96 m)	200 lb (91 kg)	GS	Providence, UT
F	24	Isaiah Carr	7 ft 0 in (2.13 m)	240 lb (109 kg)	So	Las Cruces, NM
F	25	Touko Tainamo	6 ft 9 in (2.06 m)	220 lb (100 kg)	Jr	Helsinki, FIN
G	32	Isaiah Addo-Ankrah	6 ft 7 in (2.01 m)	200 lb (91 kg)	Sr	Houston, TX
G	40	Ben Bowen	6 ft 5 in (1.96 m)	170 lb (77 kg)	RS So	Highlands Ranch, CO

Head coach

- Jeff Wulbrun (Cal State Fullerton)

Assistant coach(es)

- Rob Zewe (Pittsburgh)
- Alex Mumphard (Greenville)
- B.J. Porter (Azusa Pacific)

Legend

- (C) Team captain
- (S) Suspended
- (I) Ineligible
- (W) Walk-on
- Injured
- Current redshirt

Roster
Last update: October 23, 2023

== Schedule and results ==
Date time, TV	Rank^{#}	Opponent^{#}	Result	Record	Site (attendance) city, state
Regular season
November 6, 2023*; 8:30 pm, ESPN+		at UC San Diego	L 87–95	0–1	RIMAC Arena (1437); La Jolla, CA
November 9, 2023*; 7:00 pm, Altitude 2/SLN		Cal Poly	W 97–76	1–1	Hamilton Gymnasium (818); Denver, CO
November 15, 2023*; 5:00 p.m.		vs. Nicholls; Jaguar Classic	W 91–85	2–1	Mitchell Center (1,109); Mobile, AL
November 16, 2023*; 4:00 p.m.		vs. SIUE; Jaguar Classic	L 74–77	2–2	Mitchell Center (1,110); Mobile, AL
November 17, 2023*; 2:00 pm, ESPN+		at South Alabama	L 75–82	2–3	Mitchell Center (1,357); Mobile, AL
November 22, 2023*; 7:00 pm, SLN		Colorado Christian	W 100–68	3–3	Hamilton Gymnasium (522); Denver, CO
November 26, 2023*; 12:00 pm, ESPN+		at Texas A&M–Commerce	W 71–61	4–3	Texas A&M–Commerce Field House (216); Commerce, TX
November 29, 2023*; 7:00 pm, ESPN+		at Idaho	W 67–65	5–3	Idaho Central Credit Union Arena (1,337); Moscow, ID
December 2, 2023*; 1:00 pm, SLN		Colorado College	W 90–66	6–3	Hamilton Gymnasium (897); Denver, CO
December 6, 2023*; 7:00 pm, MWN		at No. 13 Colorado State	L 80–90	6–4	Moby Arena (7,135); Fort Collins, CO
December 13, 2023*; 7:00 pm, ESPN+		at No. 18 BYU	L 74–90	6–5	Marriott Center (13,349); Provo, UT
December 18, 2023*; 7:00 pm, SLN		Adams State	W 89–83	7–5	Hamilton Gymnasium (1,089); Denver, CO
December 20, 2023*; 7:00 pm, SLN		Northern New Mexico	W 90–57	8–5	Hamilton Gymnasium (479); Denver, CO
December 29, 2023; 6:00 pm, SLN		at Omaha	W 95–80	9–5 (1–0)	Baxter Arena (3,707); Omaha, NE
December 31, 2023; 3:00 pm, SLN		Oral Roberts	L 86–89 ^{OT}	9–6 (1–1)	Hamilton Gymnasium (752); Denver, CO
January 3, 2024*; 7:30 pm, SLN		Idaho State; Big Sky–Summit Challenge	W 95–82 ^{OT}	10–6	Hamilton Gymnasium (634); Denver, CO
January 6, 2024*; 6:00 pm, ESPN+		at Northern Colorado; Big Sky–Summit Challenge	L 82–86	10–7	Bank of Colorado Arena (1,403); Greeley, CO
January 13, 2024; 1:00 pm, SLN		South Dakota State	W 99–80	11–7 (2–1)	Hamilton Gymnasium (198); Denver, CO
January 18, 2024; 6:00 pm, SLN		at North Dakota State	W 78–70	12–7 (3–1)	Scheels Center (1,527); Fargo, ND
January 20, 2023; 11:00 am, SLN		at North Dakota	L 78–92	12–8 (3–2)	Betty Engelstad Sioux Center (1,500); Grand Forks, ND
January 25, 2024; 7:00 pm, SLN		South Dakota	W 111–110 ^{2OT}	13–8 (4–2)	Hamilton Gymnasium (1,278); Denver, CO
January 27, 2024; 2:00 pm, SLN		Omaha	L 72–91	13–9 (4–3)	Hamilton Gymnasium (1,183); Denver, CO
February 1, 2024; 6:00 pm, SLN		at Kansas City	L 71–85	13–10 (4–4)	Swinney Recreation Center (1,042); Kansas City, MO
February 3, 2024; 6:00 pm, SLN		at Oral Roberts	L 76–82	13–11 (4–5)	Mabee Center (6,528); Tulsa, OK
February 8, 2024; 6:00 pm, SLN		at South Dakota	L 86–92 ^{OT}	13–12 (4–6)	Sanford Coyote Sports Center (1,640); Vermillion, SD
February 10, 2024; 2:00 pm, SLN		St. Thomas	W 94–77	14–12 (5–6)	Hamilton Gymnasium (1,028); Denver, CO
February 15, 2024; 7:00 pm, SLN		North Dakota	L 78–92	14–13 (5–7)	Hamilton Gymnasium (852); Denver, CO
February 17, 2024; 2:00 pm, SLN		North Dakota State	W 77–71	15–13 (6–7)	Hamilton Gymnasium (1,038); Denver, CO
February 22, 2024; 6:00 pm, SLN		at South Dakota State	L 70–97	15–14 (6–8)	Frost Arena (2,653); Brookings, SD
February 29, 2024; 7:00 pm, SLN		Kansas City	L 69–84	15–15 (6–9)	Hamilton Gymnasium (1,060); Denver, CO
March 2, 2024; 6:00 pm, SLN		at St. Thomas	L 58–83	15–16 (6–10)	Shoenecker Arena (1,607); St. Paul, MN
Summit League tournament
March 9, 2024; 8:30 pm, SLN	(7)	vs. (2) Kansas City; Quarterfinals	W 61–60	16–16	Denny Sanford Premier Center (9,121); Sioux Falls, SD
March 11, 2024; 8:30 pm, SLN	(7)	vs. (6) Omaha; Semifinals	W 66–63	17–16	Denny Sanford Premier Center (8,097); Sioux Falls, SD
March 12, 2024; 8:30 pm, CBSSN	(7)	vs. (1) South Dakota State; Championship	L 68–76	17–17	Denny Sanford Premier Center (8,268); Sioux Falls, SD
*Non-conference game. ^{#}Rankings from AP Poll. (#) Tournament seedings in parentheses. All times are in Mountain.
