= 2024 Summit League men's basketball tournament =

American college basketball postseason tournament

- Classification: Division I
- Season: 2023–24
- Teams: 9
- Site: Denny Sanford Premier Center; Sioux Falls, South Dakota
- Champions: South Dakota State (7th title)
- Winning coach: Eric Henderson (2nd title)
- MVP: William Kyle III (South Dakota State)
- Attendance: 40,588 (total); 8,268 (championship)
- Television: Summit League Network, CBSSN

2023–24 Summit League men's basketball standings
	Conf.				Overall
Team	W		L	PCT	W		L	PCT
South Dakota State †	12	–	4	.750	22	–	13	.629
Kansas City	10	–	6	.625	16	–	16	.500
North Dakota	10	–	6	.625	18	–	14	.563
St. Thomas *	9	–	7	.563	20	–	13	.606
North Dakota State	8	–	8	.500	15	–	17	.469
Omaha	7	–	9	.438	15	–	18	.455
Denver	6	–	10	.375	17	–	17	.500
Oral Roberts	5	–	11	.313	12	–	19	.387
South Dakota	5	–	11	.313	12	–	20	.375
* Ineligible for the 2024 NCAA tournament due to transition from Division III
† 2024 Summit League tournament winner

The 2024 Summit League men's basketball tournament was the postseason men's basketball tournament for the Summit League for the 2023–24 season. All tournament games were played at the Denny Sanford Premier Center in Sioux Falls, South Dakota, from March 8–12, 2024.

== Seeds ==
All nine conference teams participated in the tournament. Teams were seeded by record within the conference, with a tiebreaker system to seed teams with identical conference records. The tiebreakers operated in the following order:

1. Head-to-head record
2. Record against the top-seeded team not involved in the tie, going down through the standings until the tie is broken

If St. Thomas had won the Summit League Tournament, the conference's automatic bid would have gone to the highest seeded postseason eligible team, South Dakota State.

Seed	School	Conf. record	Tiebreaker(s)
1	South Dakota State	12–4	
2	Kansas City	10–6	1–1 vs. South Dakota State
3	North Dakota	10–6	0–2 vs. South Dakota State
4	St. Thomas	9–7	
5	North Dakota State	8–8	
6	Omaha	7–9	
7	Denver	6–10	
8	Oral Roberts	5–11	1–1 vs. South Dakota State
9	South Dakota	5–11	0–2 vs. South Dakota State

== Schedule and results ==
Game	Time	Matchup	Score	Television	Attendance
First Round - Friday, March 8
1	7:00 pm	No. 8 Oral Roberts vs. No. 9 South Dakota	77–62	MidcoSN/Summit League Network	7,611
Quarterfinals – Saturday, March 9
2	6:00 pm	No. 1 South Dakota State vs. No. 8 Oral Roberts	79–63	MidcoSN/Summit League Network	9,121
3	8:30 pm	No. 2 Kansas City vs. No. 7 Denver	61–60	MidcoSN/Summit League Network	9,121
Quarterfinals – Sunday, March 10
4	6:00 pm	No. 4 St. Thomas vs. No. 5 North Dakota State	68–58	MidcoSN/Summit League Network	7,491
5	8:30 pm	No. 3 North Dakota vs. No. 6 Omaha	73–72	MidcoSN/Summit League Network	7,491
Semifinals - Monday, March 11
6	6:00 pm	No. 1 South Dakota State vs. No. 4 St. Thomas	59–49	MidcoSN/Summit League Network	8,097
7	8:30 pm	No. 7 Denver vs. No. 6 Omaha	66–63	MidcoSN/Summit League Network	8,097
Final – Tuesday, March 12
8	8:30 pm	No. 1 South Dakota State vs. No. 7 Denver	76–68	CBSSN	8,268
*Game times in CST. Rankings denote tournament seed. Reference:

== Bracket ==
Opening Round; March 8 Summit League Network
8	Oral Roberts	77
9	South Dakota	62

Quarterfinals; March 9 & 10; Summit League Network
1	South Dakota State	79
8	Oral Roberts	63
4	St. Thomas	68
5	North Dakota State	58
2	Kansas City	60
7	Denver	61
3	North Dakota	72
6	Omaha	73

Semifinals; March 11; Summit League Network
1	South Dakota State	59
4	St. Thomas	49
7	Denver	66
6	Omaha	63

Final; March 12; CBSSN
1	South Dakota State	76
7	Denver	68

== All-Tournament Team ==
The following players were named to the All-Tournament team:

Player	School
William Kyle III (MVP)	South Dakota State
Luke Appel	South Dakota State
Zeke Mayo	South Dakota State
Tommy Bruner	Denver
Frankie Fidler	Omaha
