= Russell Springmann =

American basketball coach (born 1969)

Current position
- Title: Assistant coach
- Team: Miami
- Conference: ACC

Biographical details
- Born: September 24, 1969 (age 56); Silver Spring, Maryland, U.S.

Playing career
- 1986–1990: Salisbury State

Coaching career (HC unless noted)
- 1990–1992: Salisbury State (assistant)
- 1992–1996: Mardela HS
- 1996–1998: Florida (graduate assistant)
- 2001–2015: Texas (assistant)
- 2015–2017: San Diego (assistant)
- 2018–2023: Oral Roberts (assistant)
- 2023–2025: Oral Roberts
- 2025–present: Miami (assistant)

Administrative career (AD unless noted)
- 1998–2001: Texas (administrative assistant)
- 2017–2018: Oklahoma City Thunder (Scout)

Head coaching record
- Overall: 19–42 (.311)

Russell Springmann (born September 24, 1969) is an American college basketball coach who is currently an assistant coach at the University of Miami.

== Playing career ==
Springmann played college basketball at Salisbury State where he was a two-time team captain.

== Coaching career ==
After graduation, Springmann assisted his alma mater for two seasons before becoming the head boys' basketball coach at Mardela High School from 1992 to 1996. He joined the college ranks in an administrative role under Billy Donovan at Florida before joining Rick Barnes's staff at Texas in an administrative capacity in 1998. In 2001, he was elevated to assistant coach, a role he'd serve in until 2015. From 2015 to 2017, Springmann was an assistant at San Diego, and served one year as a scout for the NBA's Oklahoma City Thunder.

In 2018, he joined Paul Mills's staff at Oral Roberts and was on staff for the Golden Eagles' 2021 Sweet 16 run. When Mills accepted the head coaching position at Wichita State, Springmann was elevated to head coach on March 22, 2023.

Springmann joined Jai Lucas's inaugural coaching staff at Miami in May 2025.

== Head coaching record ==
Record table
Season	Team	Overall	Conference	Standing	Postseason
Oral Roberts Golden Eagles (Summit League) (2023–2025)
2023–24	Oral Roberts	12–19	5–11	T–8th	
2024–25	Oral Roberts	7–23	3–13	9th	
Oral Roberts:		19–42 (.311)	8–24 (.250)		
Total:		19–42 (.311)			
National champion Postseason invitational champion Conference regular season champion Conference regular season and conference tournament champion Division regular season champion Division regular season and conference tournament champion Conference tournament champion
