= Touko Tainamo =

Finnish basketball player (born 2001)

No. 25 – ZZ Leiden
- Position: Power forward
- League: BNXT League

Personal information
- Born: January 6, 2001 (age 25) Helsinki, Finland
- Listed height: 2.06 m (6 ft 9 in)
- Listed weight: 100 kg (220 lb)

Career information
- High school: Helsinki Basketball Academy (Helsinki, Finland)
- College: Denver (2021–2024); Wyoming (2024–2025)
- NBA draft: 2025: undrafted
- Playing career: 2017–present

Career history
- 2017–2018: Munkkiniemen Kisapojat
- 2018–2020: HBA-Märsky
- 2025–2026: USK Praha
- 2026–present: ZZ Leiden

Touko Tainamo (born 6 January 2001) is a Finnish professional basketball player for ZZ Leiden in BNXT League.

== College career ==
In December 2023 while playing with Denver Pioneers, Tainamo grabbed a Denver's record-tying 20 rebounds in a game.

== Professional career ==
On 28 August 2025, Tainamo returned to Europe and turned professional after signing with USK Praha of the Czech National Basketball League.

== National team career ==
Tainamo has played for Finland U18 at the 2018 FIBA U18 European Championship and at the 2019 FIBA U18 European Championship. He also represented Finland at the postponed 2021 Summer Universiade competitions in Chengdu in the summer 2023, where Finland finished 5th, the best position in the nation's history.

He has played one game with the Finland national basketball team against Estonia in 2020.

== Career statistics ==
Legend
GP	Games played	GS	Games started	MPG	Minutes per game
FG%	Field goal percentage	3P%	3-point field goal percentage	FT%	Free throw percentage
RPG	Rebounds per game	APG	Assists per game	SPG	Steals per game
BPG	Blocks per game	PPG	Points per game	**Bold**	Career high

=== College ===
Year	Team	GP	GS	MPG	FG%	3P%	FT%	RPG	APG	SPG	BPG	PPG
2021–22	Denver	32	23	22.7	**.578**	.353	.581	5.1	.5	.4	**.6**	7.4
2022–23	Denver	32	25	27.8	.524	**.417**	.692	6.4	**.9**	**.5**	.4	10.6
2023–24	Denver	**34**	**34**	**29.5**	.467	.343	**.728**	**7.7**	.6	.4	**.6**	**15.6**
2024–25	Wyoming	28	5	15.5	.396	.200	.660	2.9	.7	.4	.3	5.6
Career		126	87	24.2	4.91	.330	.691	5.7	.7	.5	.5	9.9
