= White River High School =

High school in South Dakota, United States

Coordinates: 43°34′05″N 100°44′40″W

Location
- 501 East 3rd Street; White River, (Mellette County), South Dakota 57579; United States

Information
- Type: Public high school
- Principal: Peri Strain
- Staff: 12.26 (FTE)
- Enrollment: 118 (2023-24)
- Student to teacher ratio: 9.62
- Colors: Purple and gold
- Fight song: "On Wisconsin"
- Nickname: Tigers

White River High School is a high school in White River, South Dakota, USA. The athletics teams are known as the Tigers.
