= Tommy Bruner =

American basketball player (born 2001)

Free agent
- Position: Point guard

Personal information
- Born: April 22, 2001 (age 25) Columbia, South Carolina, U.S.
- Listed height: 6 ft 1 in (1.85 m)
- Listed weight: 180 lb (82 kg)

Career information
- High school: Gray Collegiate Academy (Columbia, South Carolina)
- College: USC Upstate (2019–2021); Jacksonville (2021–2022); Denver (2022–2024)
- NBA draft: 2024: undrafted
- Playing career: 2024–present

Career history
- 2024: Santa Cruz Warriors
- 2024–2025: Texas Legends
- 2025: Oklahoma City Blue
- 2026: Memphis Hustle

Career highlights
- First-team All-Summit League (2024); Summit League All-Newcomer Team (2023); Big South All-Freshman Team (2020)

Tommy Bruner (born April 22, 2001) is an American professional basketball player who last played for the Memphis Hustle of the NBA G League. He played college basketball for the USC Upstate Spartans, the Jacksonville Dolphins and the Denver Pioneers.

== High school career ==
Bruner attended Gray Collegiate Academy in Columbia, South Carolina. He led Gray to back-to-back South Carolina Class AA state championships. As a senior, he averaged 16.2 points per game and was named the Class AA Player of the Year.

== College career ==
=== USC Upstate (2019–2021) ===
Bruner committed to play college basketball at the University of South Carolina Upstate (USC Upstate). As a freshman in 2019–20 he averaged 14 points per game, good for second-best on the team, and was named a freshman All-American. He was the Big South Conference's player of the week twice and later selected to the Big South All-Freshman Team. In 2020–21, Bruner's sophomore season, he led USC Upstate in points per game (13.6) and total assists (85). At the end of the season he was named as an honorable mention to the All-Big South Team.

=== Jacksonville (2021–2022) ===
Bruner transferred to Jacksonville prior to the start of his redshirt sophomore season. He appeared in just 13 games before suffering a season-ending foot injury. He averaged 8.8 points per game.

=== Denver (2022–2024) ===
After spending just one season at Jacksonville, Bruner looked to transfer. He felt an instant connection with Denver; he said "It was such a family vibe. That’s when I really knew I was in the right place." During his redshirt junior year of 2022–23, Bruner averaged then-career highs of 15.9 points, 4.2 assists, and 2.8 rebounds per game. He helped the Pioneers start the season with an 8–1 record, which is a program record through the first nine games. While the team success was not sustained over the course of the season, Bruner's personal production was, and he was voted to the Summit League's All-Newcomer team. He received an honorable mention nod on the All-Summit League Team. Bruner also surpassed the career 1,000-point milestone on December 7, 2022 against Sacramento State.

In 2023–24, Bruner was named to the All-Summit League First Team on March 7, 2024.

== Professional career ==
=== Santa Cruz Warriors (2024) ===
After going undrafted in the 2024 NBA draft, Bruner joined the Rip City Remix on October 28, 2024, but was waived on November 5. Six days later, he signed with the Santa Cruz Warriors and was later waived on November 25.

=== Texas Legends (2024–2025) ===
On December 28, 2024, Bruner joined the Texas Legends. However, he was waived on January 6.

On January 31, 2025, joined the Long Island Nets, but was waived on February 3, without playing for the Nets.

== Career statistics ==
Legend
GP	Games played	GS	Games started	MPG	Minutes per game
FG%	Field goal percentage	3P%	3-point field goal percentage	FT%	Free throw percentage
RPG	Rebounds per game	APG	Assists per game	SPG	Steals per game
BPG	Blocks per game	PPG	Points per game	**Bold**	Career high

=== College ===
Year	Team	GP	GS	MPG	FG%	3P%	FT%	RPG	APG	SPG	BPG	PPG
2019–20	USC Upstate	33	32	29.7	.413	.337	.802	2.1	2.3	.9	.0	14.0
2020–21	USC Upstate	21	17	32.5	.405	.327	.810	**2.8**	4.0	1.0	.0	13.6
2021–22	Jacksonville	13	1	20.1	.426	.340	**.867**	1.8	1.8	1.2	**.1**	8.8
2022–23	Denver	32	32	**34.6**	.402	.333	.844	**2.8**	**4.2**	1.1	.0	15.9
2023–24	Denver	**34**	**34**	33.8	**.435**	**.353**	.808	**2.8**	**4.2**	**1.3**	**.1**	**24.0**
Career		133	116	31.4	.418	.341	.818	2.5	3.5	1.1	.1	16.4

== Personal life ==
Bruner's sister Ashley played basketball at South Carolina and is retired from playing professionally overseas. His older brother Jordan plays professional basketball.

Bruner is also the founder and CEO of a nonprofit organization he named "Be Different." The name is an homage to a slogan he once used on t-shirts in high school to encourage kids to stand out. Bruner said that his long-term plan for Be Different will focus on funding preschools to establish an encouraging base for kids.
