= Phoenix College Preparatory Academy =

Coordinates: 33.4865°N 112.0864°W

Location
- 11th Avenue and Osborn Road (bldg. OSE-105); Phoenix, Arizona

Information
- School type: Public charter high school
- Grades: 9–12

Phoenix College Preparatory Academy is a high school in Phoenix, Arizona, operated by the Maricopa Community College District. It was formerly known as Teacher Preparation High School. High school students attend college classes on the campus of Phoenix College. Students also have access to the college's facilities. It is a member of the Canyon Athletic Association.
