= Swinney Recreation Center =

Sports facility at the University of Missouri–Kansas City

- Old Swinney
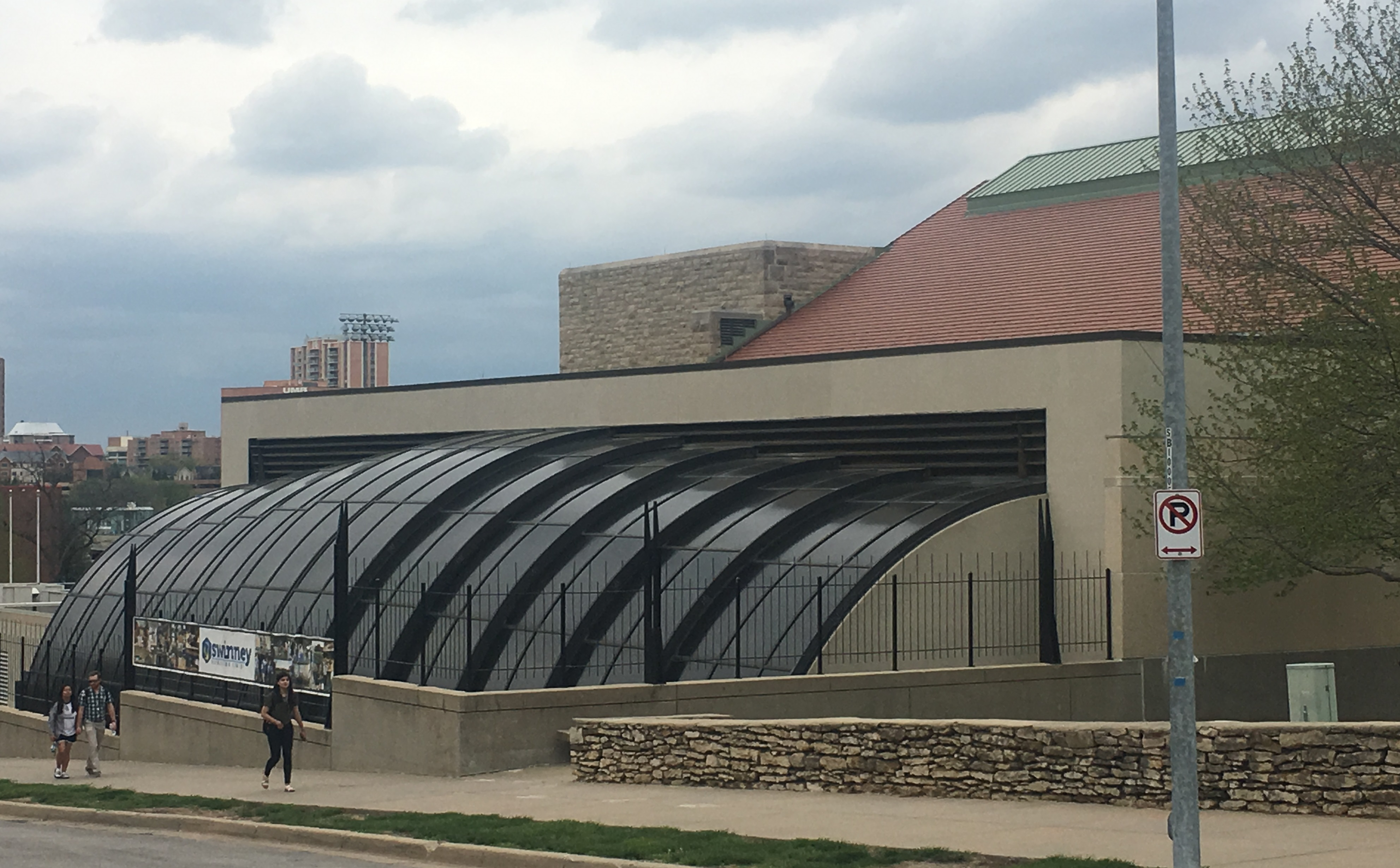
- Interactive map of Swinney Recreation Center
- Former names: Swinney Gymnasium
- Location: 5030 Holmes Street; Kansas City, MO 64110
- Coordinates: 39°02′08″N 94°34′44″W
- Owner: University of Missouri–Kansas City
- Operator: University of Missouri–Kansas City
- Capacity: 1,500

Construction
- Built: 1941
- Renovated: 1988

Tenants
- Kansas City Roos men's basketball (1969–1986, 201–2012, 2019–present); Kansas City Roos women's basketball (1980–present); Kansas City Roos volleyball

Swinney Recreation Center is home to student recreation center at University of Missouri–Kansas City (UMKC) in Kansas City, Missouri. The recreation center includes a fitness center, five multipurpose basketball courts, several group fitness studios, three racquetball courts, a squash court, an indoor track, a recreational field, an outdoor track and a large aquatics center. The recreation center offers memberships for UMKC students, faculty and staff as well as community members. The recreation center also holds a 1,500-seat arena It is the home of the UMKC men's and women's basketball teams, as well as the volleyball team known since the 2019–20 season as the Kansas City Roos. Under the school's previous athletic identity as the UMKC Kangaroos, the men's basketball team played there from 1969 to 1986, and again from 2010 to 2012. The men returned at the beginning of 2019. The Kansas City women's basketball team also currently plays their home games at Swinney Recreation Center.

Swinney Recreation Center was originally built in 1941 as Swinney Gymnasium by what was then the University of Kansas City. It was named in honor of Edward F. Swinney, chairman of First National Bank of Kansas City (now part of Bank of America), who had donated $250,000 toward the project. Long known as "Old Swinney," it was renamed Swinney Recreation Center after a $14.5 million addition in 1988. The facility now has five basketball/volleyball courts, four racquetball courts, a 25-yard indoor/outdoor pool, and exercise rooms.

The men's team played at Swinney during its days as an NAIA member, and moved to Municipal Auditorium when it joined the NCAA. However, in 2010, UMKC announced that the men's basketball team would make Swinney its primary home court. They moved back to Municipal just two years later. They returned to the Swinney Recreation Center at the beginning of 2019.

== See also ==
- List of NCAA Division I basketball arenas
