= 2024–25 Tarleton State Texans men's basketball team =

American college basketball season

2024–25 Tarleton State Texans men's basketball
- Conference: Western Athletic Conference
- Record: 12–20 (7–9 WAC)
- Head coach: Billy Gillispie (5th season)
- Assistant coaches: Zach Settembre; Glynn Cyprien; Luke Adams; Brandon Espinosa
- Home arena: Wisdom Gym

2024–25 WAC men's basketball standings
	Conf.				Overall
Team	W		L	PCT	W		L	PCT
Utah Valley	15	–	1	.938	25	–	9	.735
Grand Canyon †	13	–	3	.813	26	–	8	.765
California Baptist	9	–	7	.563	17	–	15	.531
Abilene Christian	8	–	8	.500	16	–	16	.500
Seattle	8	–	8	.500	14	–	18	.438
Tarleton State	7	–	9	.438	12	–	20	.375
UT Arlington	6	–	10	.375	13	–	18	.419
Southern Utah	4	–	12	.250	12	–	19	.387
Utah Tech	2	–	14	.125	7	–	26	.212
† 2025 WAC tournament winner

The 2024–25 Tarleton State Texans men's basketball team represented Tarleton State University in the 2024–25 NCAA Division I men's basketball season. They were led by fifth-year head coach Billy Gillispie and played their home games at the Wisdom Gym in Stephenville, Texas as members of the Western Athletic Conference (WAC).

This was the final season for the Texans at Wisdom Gym. Both men's and women's basketball moved to the new on-campus EECU Center in 2025–26.

The Texans finished the season 12–20, 7–9 in WAC play, to finish in sixth place. They were defeated by California Baptist in the quarterfinals of the WAC tournament.

== Previous season ==
The Texans finished the 2023–24 season 23–8, 16–4 in WAC play, to finish in second place. As the No. 2 seed in the WAC tournament, they lost to UT Arlington in the semifinals. They received an invitation to the CIT, where they defeated Texas Southern in the first round and fellow WAC member Abilene Christian in the quarterfinals, before losing to Purdue Fort Wayne in the semifinals.

== Roster ==
2024–25 Tarleton State Texans men's basketball team
Players
Coaches

Pos.	#	Name	Height	Weight	Year	Previous school	Hometown
G	0	Izzy Miles	6 ft 2 in (1.88 m)	185 lb (84 kg)	So	Grissom HS	Huntsville, AL
G	1	Matt Krass	6 ft 2 in (1.88 m)	190 lb (86 kg)	Fr	St. Patrick Catholic HS	Gulfport, MS
G/F	2	Freddy Hicks	6 ft 5 in (1.96 m)	215 lb (98 kg)	Sr	Arkansas State	Searcy, AR
F	3	Ronnie Jr. Harrison	6 ft 6 in (1.98 m)	210 lb (95 kg)	So	Navarro College	Forney, TX
G	4	Jordan Mizell	6 ft 2 in (1.88 m)	165 lb (75 kg)	Fr	Plano East SHS	Plano, TX
G	5	Malek Archie	6 ft 2 in (1.88 m)	185 lb (84 kg)	Fr	McKinney HS	Chicago, IL
G	6	Marty Silvera	6 ft 1 in (1.85 m)	190 lb (86 kg)	Sr	Southern Connecticut	Worcester, MA
G	7	Karim Elgizawy	6 ft 3 in (1.91 m)	200 lb (91 kg)	Fr	Ramsis College	Cairo, Egypt
G	8	Joseph Martinez	6 ft 3 in (1.91 m)	175 lb (79 kg)	RS Fr	Canutillo HS	El Paso, TX
G	9	Collin Course	6 ft 1 in (1.85 m)	190 lb (86 kg)	Sr	Texas Wesleyan	Mansfield, TX
F	10	Keitenn Bristow	6 ft 8 in (2.03 m)	190 lb (86 kg)	Fr	Holliday HS	Wichita Falls, TX
G	11	Bubu Benjamin	6 ft 7 in (2.01 m)	205 lb (93 kg)	So	Edge School	Medicine Hat, AB
G	12	Dantwan Grimes	6 ft 1 in (1.85 m)	180 lb (82 kg)	Jr	Baylor	Ocala, FL
G	15	Caleb Evans	6 ft 4 in (1.93 m)	180 lb (82 kg)	Fr	Klein HS	Houston, TX
G	21	Nick Krass	6 ft 3 in (1.91 m)	195 lb (88 kg)	So	MGCCC	Gulfport, MS
F	23	Chris Mpaka	6 ft 6 in (1.98 m)	225 lb (102 kg)	Jr	Indian Hills CC	Kinshasa, DR Congo
G	24	Roy Marom	5 ft 8 in (1.73 m)	140 lb (64 kg)	Fr	Centennial HS	Frisco, TX
F	97	Andy Sigiscar	6 ft 9 in (2.06 m)	220 lb (100 kg)	Fr	Jaques Prevert HS	Orléans, France

Head coach

- Billy Gillispie (Texas State)

Assistant coach(es)

- Zach Settembre (Syracuse)
- Glynn Cyprien (SUNO)
- Luke Adams (Texas Tech)
- Brandon Espinosa (Dallas Christian)

Legend

- (C) Team captain
- (S) Suspended
- (I) Ineligible
- (W) Walk-on
- Injured
- Current redshirt

Roster
Last update: December 1, 2024

== Schedule and results ==
Date time, TV	Rank^{#}	Opponent^{#}	Result	Record	High points	High rebounds	High assists	Site (attendance) city, state
Exhibition
October 28, 2024*; 7:00 p.m.		UT Tyler	W 65–56		–	–	–	Wisdom Gym; Stephenville, TX
Regular season
November 4, 2024*; 7:30 p.m., ACCN/ESPN+		at SMU	L 62–96	0–1	21 – Benjamin	6 – 2 tied	3 – Benjamin	Moody Coliseum (5,454); Dallas, TX
November 9, 2024*; 7:00 p.m., ESPN+		Sam Houston; C-USA/WAC Alliance	L 62–91	0–2	17 – Benjamin	10 – Benjamin	6 – Mizell	Wisdom Gym (1,487); Stephenville, TX
November 12, 2024*; 7:00 p.m., ACCN/ESPN+		at Florida State	L 52–72	0–3	15 – Mpaka	11 – Mpaka	3 – Miles	Donald L. Tucker Center (3,068); Tallahassee, FL
November 14, 2024*; 7:00 p.m., ESPN+		Tabor (KS)	W 88–57	1–3	17 – 2 tied	7 – 2 tied	4 – 2 tied	Wisdom Gym (1,176); Stephenville, TX
November 17, 2024*; 7:00 p.m., ESPN+		at No. 12 Baylor	L 41–104	1–4	11 – Martinez	4 – N. Krass	4 – N. Krass	Foster Pavilion (7,500); Waco, TX
November 21, 2024*; 8:30 p.m., BTN		at Michigan	L 49–72	1–5	15 – Benjamin	5 – Mizell	2 – Miles	Crisler Center (9,831); Ann Arbor, MI
November 29, 2024*; 2:00 p.m., FloHoops		vs. Iona; Nassau Championship	L 51–62	1–6	22 – Benjamin	7 – Benjamin	3 – Mizell	Baha Mar Convention Center (237); Nassau, Bahamas
November 30, 2024*; 4:30 p.m., FloHoops		vs. Hofstra; Nassau Championship	W 61–59	2–6	27 – Harrison Jr.	9 – Miles	4 – Martinez	Baha Mar Convention Center (362); Nassau, Bahamas
December 1, 2024*; 7:00 p.m., FloHoops		vs. Indiana State; Nassau Championship	L 71–87	2–7	22 – Harrison Jr.	6 – 2 tied	3 – Martinez	Baha Mar Convention Center (212); Nassau, Bahamas
December 3, 2024*; 7:00 p.m., ESPN+		Dallas Christian	W 90–50	3–7	29 – Benjamin	7 – 2 tied	6 – Benjamin	Wisdom Gym (1,379); Stephenville, TX
December 8, 2024*; 12:00 p.m., ESPN+		at UCF	L 51–66	3–8	13 – Benjamin	9 – Mpaka	4 – Bristow	Addition Financial Arena; Orlando, FL
December 16, 2024*; 8:00 p.m., ESPN+		at UTEP	L 62–67	3–9	18 – Benjamin	9 – Mpaka	3 – Mizell	Don Haskins Center (4,442); El Paso, TX
December 18, 2024*; 7:00 p.m., ESPN+		at Oklahoma State	L 61–66	3–10	17 – Bristow	8 – Miles	6 – Silvera	Gallagher-Iba Arena (5,188); Stillwater, OK
December 21, 2024*; 4:00 p.m., ESPN+		Howard Payne	W 100–83	4–10	27 – Benjamin	12 – Mpaka	6 – Grimes	Wisdom Gym (856); Stephenville, TX
December 29, 2024*; 4:00 p.m., ESPN+		Florida A&M	W 70–60	5–10	23 – Bristow	11 – Benjamin	5 – Grimes	Wisdom Gym (715); Stephenville, TX
WAC regular season
January 4, 2025; 7:00 p.m., ESPN+		UT Arlington	W 77–74	6–10 (1–0)	21 – Benjamin	5 – 2 tied	4 – Benjamin	Wisdom Gym (898); Stephenville, TX
January 9, 2025; 7:30 p.m., ESPN+		at Southern Utah	W 74–66	7–10 (2–0)	24 – Bristow	8 – 2 tied	3 – 2 tied	America First Event Center (1,453); Cedar City, UT
January 11, 2025; 8:00 p.m., ESPN+		at Utah Tech	L 54–58	7–11 (2–1)	15 – Bristow	7 – 2 tied	5 – Silvera	Burns Arena (1,736); St. George, UT
January 16, 2025; 7:00 p.m., ESPN+		California Baptist	W 67–57	8–11 (3–1)	15 – Hicks	6 – 2 tied	3 – 2 tied	Wisdom Gym (1,376); Stephenville, TX
January 18, 2025; 7:00 p.m., ESPN+		at Grand Canyon	L 64–88	8–12 (3–2)	13 – Grimes	5 – Grimes	3 – Benjamin	GCU Arena (7,105); Phoenix, AZ
January 23, 2025; 7:00 p.m., ESPN+		at Abilene Christian	L 56–67	8–13 (3–3)	14 – Grimes	4 – Benjamin	2 – Mizell	Moody Coliseum (1,854); Abilene, TX
January 30, 2025; 7:00 p.m., ESPN+		Utah Tech	W 61–54	9–13 (4–3)	14 – Benjamin	10 – Mpaka	3 – Mizell	Wisdom Gym (1,801); Stephenville, TX
February 1, 2025; 7:00 p.m., ESPN+		Southern Utah	W 75–58	10–13 (5–3)	18 – Benjamin	6 – Benjamin	6 – Mizell	Wisdom Gym (1,312); Stephenville, TX
February 6, 2025; 9:00 p.m., ESPN+		at Seattle	L 54–91	10–14 (5–4)	22 – Bristow	6 – Benjamin	2 – 3 tied	Redhawk Center (707); Seattle, WA
February 8, 2025; 3:00 p.m., ESPN+		at Utah Valley	L 56–81	10–15 (5–5)	18 – Benjamin	8 – Mpaka	2 – 3 tied	UCCU Center (1,676); Orem, UT
February 13, 2025; 7:00 p.m., ESPN+		Grand Canyon	L 60–64	10–16 (5–6)	16 – Grimes	6 – 2 tied	6 – Grimes	Wisdom Gym (1,786); Stephenville, TX
February 15, 2025; 7:00 p.m., ESPN+		Seattle	W 67–64	11–16 (6–6)	20 – Mpaka	9 – Mpaka	3 – Grimes	Wisdom Gym (2,123); Stephenville, TX
February 22, 2025; 2:00 p.m., ESPNU		at UT Arlington	L 57–67	11–17 (6–7)	14 – Hicks	6 – 2 tied	4 – Mizell	College Park Center (5,183); Arlington, TX
February 27, 2025; 7:00 p.m., ESPN+		Abilene Christian	W 67–52	12–17 (7–7)	16 – Benjamin	8 – Hicks	6 – Mizell	Wisdom Gym (3,000); Stephenville, TX
March 6, 2025; 9:00 p.m., ESPN+		at California Baptist	L 48–68	12–18 (7–8)	11 – Grimes	12 – Mpaka	3 – Mizell	Fowler Events Center (3,161); Riverside, CA
March 8, 2025; 7:00 p.m., ESPN+		Utah Valley	L 66–71	12–19 (7–9)	20 – Hicks	8 – Hicks	3 – Hicks	Wisdom Gym (3,000); Stephenville, TX
WAC tournament
March 13, 2025; 10:30 p.m., ESPNU	(6)	vs. (3) California Baptist; Quarterfinals	L 51–55	12–20	16 – Grimes	7 – Grimes	3 – Grimes	Orleans Arena; Paradise, NV
*Non-conference game. ^{#}Rankings from AP poll. (#) Tournament seedings in parentheses. All times are in Central.
