= 2025 WAC men's basketball tournament =

Postseason men's basketball tournament

- Classification: Division I
- Season: 2024–25
- Teams: 9
- Site: Orleans Arena; Paradise, Nevada
- Champions: Grand Canyon
- Winning coach: Bryce Drew (4th title)
- MVP: JaKobe Coles (Grand Canyon)
- Attendance: 3,780 (Championship game)
- Television: ESPN+, ESPN2

2024–25 WAC men's basketball standings
	Conf.				Overall
Team	W		L	PCT	W		L	PCT
Utah Valley	15	–	1	.938	25	–	9	.735
Grand Canyon †	13	–	3	.813	26	–	8	.765
California Baptist	9	–	7	.563	17	–	15	.531
Abilene Christian	8	–	8	.500	16	–	16	.500
Seattle	8	–	8	.500	14	–	18	.438
Tarleton State	7	–	9	.438	12	–	20	.375
UT Arlington	6	–	10	.375	13	–	18	.419
Southern Utah	4	–	12	.250	12	–	19	.387
Utah Tech	2	–	14	.125	7	–	26	.212
† 2025 WAC tournament winner

The 2025 WAC men's basketball tournament was the postseason men's basketball tournament of the Western Athletic Conference (WAC) for the 2024–25 NCAA Division I men's basketball season. The tournament was played from March 11–15, 2025 with the opening round at Burns Arena in St. George, Utah and the remaining rounds at the Orleans Arena in Paradise, Nevada near Las Vegas. Burns Arena was the home court for WAC member Utah Tech. The last time that a WAC tournament game was held at a conference member's campus site was in 2010. This was the 15th year that the tournament was held at the Orleans Arena. Grand Canyon, who won the conference tournament, received the conference's automatic bid to the NCAA tournament for a third straight season.

== Seeds ==
All nine members were invited to the tournament. The field for the WAC tournament has varied from six to twelve qualifiers. All teams were eligible for the NCAA tournament including Tarleton and Utah Tech which completed their transition to Division I in 2024. For the prior two seasons, the WAC tournament was seeded using the WAC Résumé Seeding System. For the 2025 WAC tournament, seeding was determined by conference record with ties broken first by head-to-head competition, then by the WAC Résumé Seeding System points.

Seed	School	Conference record	Tiebreak 1	Tiebreak 2 / WAC Seeding points
1	Utah Valley	15–1		
2	Grand Canyon	13–3		
3	California Baptist	9–7		
4	Abilene Christian	8–8	1–1 vs. Seattle	WACpts -2.839 (Note: Estimated based on information in the March 7, 2025 WAC Résumé Seeding System update. The WAC did not release the final regular-season point totals.)
5	Seattle	8–8	1–1 vs. Abilene Christian	WACpts -4.057
6	Tarleton	7–9		
7	UT Arlington	6–10		
8	Southern Utah	4–12		
9	Utah Tech	2–14		

== Schedule ==
Session	Game	Time*	Matchup^{#}	Score	Television	Attendance
First round – Tuesday, March 11, 2025 – Burns Arena, St. George, Utah†
1	1	2:30 p.m.	No. 8 Southern Utah at No. 9 Utah Tech	65–72	ESPN+	1,022
Quarterfinals – Wednesday, March 12, 2025 – Orleans Arena, Paradise, Nevada
2	2	6:00 p.m.	No. 1 Utah Valley vs. No. 9 Utah Tech	74–57	ESPN+	1,645
2	3	8:30 p.m.	No. 2 Grand Canyon vs. No. 7 UT Arlington	98–75	ESPN+	1,645
Quarterfinals – Thursday, March 13, 2025 – Orleans Arena, Paradise, Nevada
3	4	6:00 p.m.	No. 4 Abilene Christian vs. No. 5 Seattle	63–69	ESPN+	927
3	5	8:30 p.m.	No. 3 California Baptist vs. No. 6 Tarleton	55–51	ESPN+	927
Semifinals – Friday, March 14, 2025 – Orleans Arena, Paradise, Nevada
4	6	6:00 p.m.	No. 1 Utah Valley vs. No. 5 Seattle	68–55	ESPN+	3,867
4	7	8:30 p.m.	No. 2 Grand Canyon vs. No. 3 California Baptist	75–66	ESPN+	3,867
Championship – Saturday, March 15, 2025 – Orleans Arena, Paradise, Nevada
5	8	8:40 p.m.	No. 1 Utah Valley vs. No. 2 Grand Canyon	82–89	ESPN2	3,780
* Game times in MDT for the first round and PDT from the quarterfinals onward. Rankings denote tournament seeding. † St. George, Utah is located in the Mountain Time Zone. Utah Tech's home court was selected as the predetermined site for the first-round game, which resulted in the Trailblazers playing a tournament game at home.

== Bracket ==
First round Tuesday, March 11; Burns Arena, St. George, Utah; ESPN+
8	Southern Utah	65
9	Utah Tech	72

Quarterfinals; Wednesday and Thursday, March 12–13; Orleans Arena, Paradise, Nevada; ESPN+
1	Utah Valley	74
9	Utah Tech	57
4	Abilene Christian	63
5	Seattle	69
2	Grand Canyon	98
7	UT Arlington	75
3	California Baptist	55
6	Tarleton	51

Semifinals; Friday, March 14; Orleans Arena, Paradise, Nevada; ESPN+
1	Utah Valley	68
5	Seattle	55
2	Grand Canyon	75
3	California Baptist	66

Championship; Saturday, March 15; Orleans Arena, Paradise, Nevada; ESPN2
1	Utah Valley	82
2	Grand Canyon	89

== Awards ==
Award	Player	Team
Most Outstanding Player	JaKobe Coles	Grand Canyon
All-Tournament Team	Tanner Toolson	Utah Valley
	Carter Welling	Utah Valley
	Tyon Grant-Foster	Grand Canyon
	Ray Harrison	Grand Canyon

== See also ==
- 2025 WAC women's basketball tournament
