= 2024–25 UT Arlington Mavericks men's basketball team =

American college basketball season

2024–25 UT Arlington Mavericks men's basketball
- Conference: Western Athletic Conference
- Record: 13–18 (6–10 WAC)
- Head coach: K. T. Turner (2nd season)
- Associate head coach: Sean Stout
- Assistant coaches: Jeremy Pope; Keith Pickens; Cody San Miguel; Derrick Obasohan
- Home arena: College Park Center

2024–25 WAC men's basketball standings
	Conf.				Overall
Team	W		L	PCT	W		L	PCT
Utah Valley	15	–	1	.938	25	–	9	.735
Grand Canyon †	13	–	3	.813	26	–	8	.765
California Baptist	9	–	7	.563	17	–	15	.531
Abilene Christian	8	–	8	.500	16	–	16	.500
Seattle	8	–	8	.500	14	–	18	.438
Tarleton State	7	–	9	.438	12	–	20	.375
UT Arlington	6	–	10	.375	13	–	18	.419
Southern Utah	4	–	12	.250	12	–	19	.387
Utah Tech	2	–	14	.125	7	–	26	.212
† 2025 WAC tournament winner

The 2024–25 UT Arlington Mavericks men's basketball team represented the University of Texas at Arlington in the 2024–25 NCAA Division I men's basketball season. They were led by second-year head coach K. T. Turner and played their games at College Park Center in Arlington, Texas as members of the Western Athletic Conference (WAC).

== Previous season ==
The Mavericks finished the 2023–24 season 18–13, 13–7 in WAC play, to finish in third place. As the No. 3 seed in the WAC tournament, they defeated Stephen F. Austin in the quarterfinals and Tarleton in the semifinals, before losing to Grand Canyon in the championship game.

== Roster ==
2024–25 UT Arlington Mavericks men's basketball team
Players
Coaches

Pos.	#	Name	Height	Weight	Year	Hometown
G	1	Jaden Wells	6 ft 2 in (1.88 m)	172 lb (78 kg)	GS	Hurst, TX
F	2	Raysean Seamster	6 ft 8 in (2.03 m)	200 lb (91 kg)	Jr	Portland, OR
G	3	Kade Douglas	6 ft 2 in (1.88 m)	175 lb (79 kg)	So	Lancaster, TX
F	5	Diante Smith	6 ft 7 in (2.01 m)	195 lb (88 kg)	GS	Fort Walton Beach, FL
F	6	Lance Ware	6 ft 10 in (2.08 m)	220 lb (100 kg)	GS	Burlington, NJ
G	7	Brandyn Talbot	6 ft 4 in (1.93 m)	181 lb (82 kg)	Sr	Toronto, ON
F	8	Troy Hupstead	6 ft 7 in (2.01 m)	230 lb (104 kg)	Sr	Mount Vernon, NY
G	9	Zachariah Mianab	6 ft 0 in (1.83 m)	175 lb (79 kg)	Fr	Frisco, TX
F/C	11	Tuscan Onuoha	6 ft 11 in (2.11 m)	250 lb (113 kg)	Jr	Sydney, Australia
G	12	Darius Burford	6 ft 3 in (1.91 m)	165 lb (75 kg)	GS	Bolingbrook, IL
G	13	Jarren Cook	6 ft 3 in (1.91 m)	218 lb (99 kg)	RS Jr	Dallas, TX
F	22	Jaxon Ellingsworth	6 ft 9 in (2.06 m)	220 lb (100 kg)	Jr	Morehead City, NC
G	23	Ja'Monti Wright	5 ft 11 in (1.8 m)	190 lb (86 kg)	So	Louisville, KY
F/C	34	Cameron Jackson	6 ft 8 in (2.03 m)	231 lb (105 kg)	Fr	Pflugerville, TX
G	55	Brody Robinson	5 ft 11 in (1.8 m)	160 lb (73 kg)	Jr	Houston, TX

Head coach

- K. T. Turner (Oklahoma City)

Assistant coach(es)

- Sean Stout (North Carolina)
- Jeremy Pope (Biola)
- Keith Pickens (Missouri State)
- Cody San Miguel (Texas State)
- Derrick Obasohan (UT Arlington)

Legend

- (C) Team captain
- (S) Suspended
- (I) Ineligible
- (W) Walk-on
- Injured
- Current redshirt

Roster
Last update: November 29, 2024

== Schedule and results ==
Date time, TV	Rank^{#}	Opponent^{#}	Result	Record	High points	High rebounds	High assists	Site (attendance) city, state
Regular season
November 4, 2024*; 11:00 a.m., ESPN+		UNT Dallas	W 90–55	1–0	22 – Wells	11 – Hupstead	5 – Seamster	College Park Center (1,001); Arlington, TX
November 9, 2024*; 5:00 p.m., ESPN+		Louisiana Tech; C-USA/WAC Alliance	L 77–92	1–1	20 – Hupstead	7 – Tied	5 – Robinson	College Park Center (3,195); Arlington, TX
November 13, 2024*; 8:00 p.m., BTN		at USC	L 95–98	1–2	27 – Wells	7 – Burford	8 – Douglas	Galen Center (2,519); Los Angeles, CA
November 15, 2024*; 7:00 p.m., ESPN+		Texas College	W 95–69	2–2	16 – Wells	7 – Burford	8 – Robinson	College Park Center (1,169); Arlington, TX
November 19, 2024*; 7:00 p.m., ESPN+		at Missouri State	L 68–78	2–3	19 – Ellingsworth	9 – Burford	4 – Robinson	Great Southern Bank Arena (2,178); Springfield, MO
November 26, 2024*; 5:00 p.m.		vs. Murray State; Jacksonville Classic	L 66–79	2–4	26 – Ware	9 – Tied	3 – Tied	FSCJ South Gym (121); Jacksonville, FL
November 27, 2024*; 5:00 p.m.		vs. Austin Peay; Jacksonville Classic	W 68–58	3–4	16 – Robinson	7 – Tied	2 – Tied	FSCJ South Gym (276); Jacksonville, FL
November 28, 2024*; 2:00 p.m.		vs. Rhode Island; Jacksonville Classic	L 78–83	3–5	18 – Wells	9 – Wells	5 – Burford	FSCJ South Gym (136); Jacksonville, FL
December 2, 2024*; 6:30 p.m., ESPN+		at Louisiana–Monroe	W 84–70	4–5	17 – Ware	9 – Tied	5 – Burford	Fant–Ewing Coliseum (947); Monroe, LA
December 12, 2024*; 7:00 p.m., ESPN+		at Arkansas State	L 79–83	4–6	19 – Wells	7 – Tied	6 – Burford	First National Bank Arena (4,914); Jonesboro, AR
December 14, 2024*; 2:00 p.m., ESPN+		Louisiana–Monroe	W 77–68	5–6	17 – Ware	7 – Wells	5 – Robinson	College Park Center (1,369); Arlington, TX
December 18, 2024*; 7:00 p.m., ESPN+		Evansville	W 80–54	6–6	18 – Smith	13 – Ware	4 – Robinson	College Park Center (1,256); Arlington, TX
December 21, 2024*; 1:00 p.m., ESPN+		at Liberty; C-USA/WAC Alliance	L 56–79	6–7	15 – Ware	11 – Ware	1 – Tied	Liberty Arena (2,649); Lynchburg, VA
December 29, 2024*; 4:00 p.m., ESPN+		at Texas State	W 80–72	7–7	24 – Smith	12 – Ware	4 – Robinson	Strahan Arena (1,023); San Marcos, TX
WAC regular season
January 4, 2025; 7:00 p.m., ESPN+		at Tarleton State	L 74–77	7–8 (0–1)	21 – Robinson	6 – Seamster	4 – Burford	Wisdom Gym (898); Stephenville, TX
January 9, 2025; 8:00 p.m., ESPN+		at Utah Tech	L 62–74	7–9 (0–2)	14 – Wells	9 – Ware	3 – Robinson	Burns Arena (1,652); St. George, UT
January 11, 2025; 7:30 p.m., ESPN+		at Southern Utah	L 68–73	7–10 (0–3)	20 – Ware	8 – Tied	6 – Robinson	America First Event Center (1,061); Cedar City, UT
January 16, 2025; 7:00 p.m., ESPN+		Utah Valley	L 83–85 ^{OT}	7–11 (0–4)	25 – Wells	11 – Ware	4 – Burford	College Park Center (1,824); Arlington, TX
January 23, 2025; 7:00 p.m., ESPN+		Seattle	W 65–56	8–11 (1–4)	14 – Wells	10 – Tied	9 – Robinson	College Park Center (1,529); Arlington, TX
January 25, 2025; 2:00 p.m., ESPN+		at Abilene Christian	W 79–76 ^{OT}	9–11 (2–4)	18 – Ware	14 – Ware	10 – Robinson	Moody Coliseum (1,232); Abilene, TX
January 30, 2025; 7:00 p.m., ESPN+		Southern Utah	W 70–68	10–11 (3–4)	26 – Ware	6 – Ware	10 – Robinson	College Park Center (1,450); Arlington, TX
February 1, 2025; 2:00 p.m., ESPN+		Utah Tech	W 73–71	11–11 (4–4)	15 – Wells	12 – Ware	7 – Robinson	College Park Center (1,430); Arlington, TX
February 6, 2025; 7:00 p.m., ESPN+		at Utah Valley	L 73–94	11–12 (4–5)	20 – Douglas	14 – Ware	3 – Tied	UCCU Center (2,681); Orem, UT
February 8, 2025; 7:00 p.m., ESPN+		at Seattle	L 65–67	11–13 (4–6)	15 – Douglas	8 – Seamster	7 – Robinson	Redhawk Center (999); Seattle, WA
February 13, 2025; 4:00 p.m., ESPN+		California Baptist	W 82–79 ^{OT}	12–13 (5–6)	29 – Seamster	8 – Tied	6 – Burford	College Park Center (1,754); Arlington, TX
February 15, 2025; 2:00 p.m., ESPN+		Grand Canyon	L 75–82	12–14 (5–7)	14 – Burford	16 – Ware	6 – Robinson	College Park Center (1,574); Arlington, TX
February 22, 2025; 7:00 p.m., ESPNU/+		Tarleton State	W 67–57	13–14 (6–7)	13 – Burford	8 – Burford	7 – Robinson	College Park Center (5,183); Arlington, TX
February 27, 2025; 8:00 p.m., ESPN+		at Grand Canyon	L 71–85	13–15 (6–8)	19 – Wells	17 – Ware	7 – Robinson	GCU Arena (7,186); Phoenix, AZ
March 1, 2025; 2:00 p.m., ESPN+		Abilene Christian	L 59–70	13–16 (6–9)	24 – Ware	11 – Ware	3 – Robinson	College Park Center (1,750); Arlington, TX
March 8, 2025; 7:00 p.m., ESPN+		at California Baptist	L 68–70	13–17 (6–10)	21 – Seamster	12 – Ware	2 – Robinson	Fowler Events Center (3,062); Riverside, CA
WAC tournament
March 12, 2025; 10:30 p.m., ESPN+	(7)	vs. (2) Grand Canyon; Quarterfinals	L 75–98	13–18	15 – Tied	6 – Ware	3 – Tied	Orleans Arena; Paradise, NV
*Non-conference game. ^{#}Rankings from AP poll. (#) Tournament seedings in parentheses. All times are in Central.
