= 2024–25 California Baptist Lancers men's basketball team =

American college basketball season

2024–25 California Baptist Lancers men's basketball
- Conference: Western Athletic Conference
- Record: 17–15 (9–7 WAC)
- Head coach: Rick Croy (12th season)
- Associate head coach: Hardy Asprilla
- Assistant coaches: Doc Wellman; Reginald Howard; Dominic Lippi; Scott Clark
- Home arena: Fowler Events Center

2024–25 WAC men's basketball standings
	Conf.				Overall
Team	W		L	PCT	W		L	PCT
Utah Valley	15	–	1	.938	25	–	9	.735
Grand Canyon †	13	–	3	.813	26	–	8	.765
California Baptist	9	–	7	.563	17	–	15	.531
Abilene Christian	8	–	8	.500	16	–	16	.500
Seattle	8	–	8	.500	14	–	18	.438
Tarleton State	7	–	9	.438	12	–	20	.375
UT Arlington	6	–	10	.375	13	–	18	.419
Southern Utah	4	–	12	.250	12	–	19	.387
Utah Tech	2	–	14	.125	7	–	26	.212
† 2025 WAC tournament winner

The 2024–25 California Baptist Lancers men's basketball team represented California Baptist University in the 2024–25 NCAA Division I men's basketball season. The Lancers, led by twelfth-year head coach Rick Croy, played their games at Fowler Events Center in Riverside, California, as members of the Western Athletic Conference (WAC).

== Previous season ==
The Lancers finished the 2023–24 season 15–16, 8–12 in WAC play, to finish in eighth place. As the No. 8 seed in the WAC tournament, they defeated Utah Valley in the first round, before losing to Seattle in the quarterfinals.

== Roster ==
2024–25 California Baptist Lancers men's basketball team
Players
Coaches

Pos.	#	Name	Height	Weight	Year	Hometown
F	0	Kendal Coleman	6 ft 8 in (2.03 m)	—	Sr	Shreveport, LA
G	1	Dominique Daniels Jr.	5 ft 10 in (1.78 m)	—	Sr	Compton, CA
G	2	Jalen Dollar	5 ft 10 in (1.78 m)	—	Fr	Seattle, WA
G	4	Brantly Stevenson	6 ft 4 in (1.93 m)	—	Sr	Rancho Cucamonga, CA
F	8	Jonathan Griman	6 ft 11 in (2.11 m)	—	So	Caracas, Venezuela
G	10	Adam Moussa	6 ft 3 in (1.91 m)	—	GS	Cairo, Egypt
G	11	Tyren Riley	6 ft 3 in (1.91 m)	—	So	Las Vegas, NV
F	12	Devon Malcolm	6 ft 5 in (1.96 m)	—	Jr	Medford, OR
G	13	Javonte Johnson	6 ft 6 in (1.98 m)	—	GS	Colorado Springs, CO
F	14	AJ Braun	6 ft 9 in (2.06 m)	—	Sr	Dayton, OH
F	15	Mouhamadou Dioum	6 ft 5 in (1.96 m)	—	Fr	Dakar, Senegal
G	20	Sam Silverstein	6 ft 6 in (1.98 m)	—	Jr	Glencoe, IL
G	25	Nico Rafalovich	6 ft 6 in (1.98 m)	—	Fr	Forest Grove, OR
G	33	Martel Williams	6 ft 3 in (1.91 m)	—	Jr	Las Vegas, NV
F	42	Bradley Henige	7 ft 0 in (2.13 m)	—	Fr	Glendale, AZ

Head coach

- Rick Croy (Azusa Pacific)

Assistant coach(es)

- Hardy Asprilla (Cal State Fullerton)
- Doc Wellman (Azusa Pacific)
- Reginald Howard (UC Riverside)
- Dominic Lippi (Whitman)
- Scott Clark (Cal Poly Humboldt)

Legend

- (C) Team captain
- (S) Suspended
- (I) Ineligible
- (W) Walk-on
- Injured
- Current redshirt

Roster
Last update: December 2, 2024

== Schedule and results ==
Date time, TV	Rank^{#}	Opponent^{#}	Result	Record	High points	High rebounds	High assists	Site (attendance) city, state
Non-conference regular season
November 4, 2024*; 7:00 p.m., ESPN+		Incarnate Word	W 83–78	1–0	17 – Tied	6 – Coleman	6 – Daniels Jr.	Fowler Events Center (3,294); Riverside, CA
November 9, 2024*; 5:00 p.m., ESPN+		Kennesaw State; C-USA/WAC Alliance	W 88–84	2–0	21 – Coleman	10 – Coleman	2 – Tied	Fowler Events Center (2,557); Riverside, CA
November 12, 2024*; 7:00 p.m., ESPN+		UC Riverside	L 69–70	2–1	20 – Daniels Jr.	10 – Tied	4 – Silverstein	Fowler Events Center (3,607); Riverside, CA
November 15, 2024*; 7:00 p.m., ESPN+		LIU	W 90–77	3–1	27 – Daniels Jr.	8 – Tied	6 – Riley	Fowler Events Center (4,233); Riverside, CA
November 20, 2024*; 7:30 p.m., ESPN+		Northern Colorado; Acrisure Holiday Invitational campus game	L 68–79	3–2	21 – Daniels Jr.	7 – Silverstein	2 – Tied	Fowler Events Center (2,737); Riverside, CA
November 23, 2024*; 5:00 p.m.		Eastern Washington	W 79–68	4–2	15 – Tied	7 – Silverstein	5 – Moussa	Fowler Events Center (2,064); Riverside, CA
November 26, 2024; 6:30 p.m., TruTV		vs. SMU; Acrisure Holiday Invitational semifinals	L 77–79	4–3	32 – Coleman	6 – Coleman	8 – Moussa	Acrisure Arena (536); Thousand Palms, CA
November 27, 2024; 9:00 p.m., TruTV		vs. Fresno State; Acrisure Holiday Invitational 3rd place game	W 86–81 ^{2OT}	5–3	29 – Daniels Jr.	15 – Coleman	5 – Moussa	Acrisure Arena (200); Thousand Palms, CA
December 1, 2024*; 1:00 p.m., ESPN+		at UCF	L 59–74	5–4	33 – Daniels Jr.	13 – Coleman	3 – Daniels Jr.	Addition Financial Arena (5,817); Orlando, FL
December 11, 2024*; 7:00 p.m., YurView		at No. 23 San Diego State	L 75–81	5–5	22 – Daniels Jr.	4 – Tied	6 – Daniels Jr.	Viejas Arena (12,414); San Diego, CA
December 16, 2024*; 4:30 p.m., ESPN+		at Middle Tennessee; C-USA/WAC Alliance	L 64–75	5–6	20 – Daniels Jr.	14 – Coleman	3 – Moussa	Murphy Center (1,724); Murfreesboro, TN
December 21, 2024*; 2:00 p.m., MW Network		at Fresno State	W 86–69	6–6	29 – Daniels Jr.	7 – Silverstein	9 – Moussa	Save Mart Center (5,263); Fresno, CA
December 28, 2024*; 5:00 p.m., ESPN+		Jackson State	W 79–73	7–6	25 – Daniels Jr.	12 – Coleman	5 – Daniels Jr.	Fowler Events Center (2,603); Riverside, CA
December 30, 2024*; 7:00 p.m., ESPN+		UC Irvine	L 63–71	7–7	19 – Tied	12 – Coleman	5 – Williams	Fowler Events Center (2,720); Riverside, CA
WAC regular season
January 4, 2025; 5:00 p.m., ESPN+		Seattle	W 61–59	8–7 (1–0)	16 – Braun	12 – Braun	6 – Moussa	Fowler Events Center (2,611); Riverside, CA
January 11, 2025; 1:00 p.m., ESPN+		at Utah Valley	L 69–75	8–8 (1–1)	16 – Braun	7 – Coleman	7 – Moussa	UCCU Center (1,863); Orem, UT
January 16, 2025; 5:00 p.m., ESPN+		at Tarleton State	L 57–67	8–9 (1–2)	19 – Daniels Jr.	9 – Coleman	6 – Moussa	Wisdom Gym (1,376); Stephenville, TX
January 18, 2025; 4:00 p.m., ESPN+		at Abilene Christian	W 60–54	9–9 (2–2)	17 – Daniels Jr.	10 – Coleman	4 – Moussa	Moody Coliseum (1,123); Abilene, TX
January 23, 2025; 8:00 p.m., ESPN+		Utah Valley	L 69–74	9–10 (2–3)	22 – Daniels Jr.	13 – Coleman	3 – Tied	Fowler Events Center (3,867); Riverside, CA
January 25, 2025; 5:30 p.m., ESPN+		at Southern Utah	W 76–60	10–10 (3–3)	16 – Tied	10 – Braun	9 – Moussa	America First Event Center (1,253); Cedar City, UT
January 30, 2025; 7:00 p.m., ESPN+		Abilene Christian	W 83–60	11–10 (4–3)	21 – Daniels Jr.	7 – Coleman	8 – Moussa	Fowler Events Center (2,567); Riverside, CA
February 6, 2025; 5:00 p.m., ESPN+		Southern Utah	L 57–60	11–11 (4–4)	18 – Daniels Jr.	8 – Braun	4 – Moussa	Fowler Events Center (2,865); Riverside, CA
February 8, 2025; 5:00 p.m., ESPN+		Grand Canyon	W 85–71	12–11 (5–4)	25 – Riley	7 – Johnson	2 – Tied	Fowler Events Center (4,174); Riverside, CA
February 13, 2025; 2:00 p.m., ESPN+		at UT Arlington	L 79–82 ^{OT}	12–12 (5–5)	15 – Johnson	13 – Coleman	6 – Riley	College Park Center (1,754); Arlington, TX
February 15, 2025; 6:00 p.m., ESPN+		Utah Tech	W 86–83	13–12 (6–5)	36 – Daniels Jr.	8 – Riley	5 – Tied	Fowler Events Center (3,952); Riverside, CA
February 22, 2025; 5:00 p.m., ESPN+		at Grand Canyon	L 64–66	13–13 (6–6)	24 – Coleman	7 – Coleman	6 – Riley	GCU Arena (7,286); Phoenix, AZ
February 27, 2025; 7:00 p.m., ESPN+		at Seattle	L 48–72	13–14 (6–7)	14 – Riley	7 – Johnson	2 – Tied	Redhawk Center (864); Seattle, WA
March 1, 2025; 6:00 p.m., ESPN+		at Utah Tech	W 61–57	14–14 (7–7)	24 – Riley	18 – Coleman	3 – Riley	Burns Arena (1,663); St. George, UT
March 6, 2025; 7:00 p.m., ESPN+		Tarleton State	W 68–48	15–14 (8–7)	19 – Johnson	8 – Riley	5 – Tied	Fowler Events Center (3,161); Riverside, CA
March 8, 2025; 5:00 p.m., ESPN+		UT Arlington	W 70–68	16–14 (9–7)	24 – Daniels Jr.	9 – Johnson	3 – Daniels Jr.	Fowler Events Center (3,062); Riverside, CA
WAC tournament
March 13, 2025; 8:30 p.m., ESPNU	(3)	vs. (6) Tarleton State; Quarterfinals	W 55–51	17–14	13 – Daniels Jr.	12 – Silverstein	6 – Riley	Orleans Arena; Paradise, NV
March 14, 2025; 8:30 p.m., ESPNU	(3)	vs. (2) Grand Canyon; Semifinals	L 66–75	17–15	18 – Daniels Jr.	11 – Coleman	3 – Moussa	Orleans Arena (3,867); Paradise, NV
*Non-conference game. ^{#}Rankings from AP poll. (#) Tournament seedings in parentheses. All times are in Pacific.
