= 2024–25 Seattle Redhawks men's basketball team =

American college basketball season

2024–25 Seattle Redhawks men's basketball
- Conference: Western Athletic Conference
- Record: 14–18 (8–8 WAC)
- Head coach: Chris Victor (4th season)
- Assistant coaches: Grant Leep; D'Marques Tyson; Steven Shpreyrengin; Colin Rardin; Bryce Douglas
- Home arena: Redhawk Center; Climate Pledge Arena

2024–25 WAC men's basketball standings
	Conf.				Overall
Team	W		L	PCT	W		L	PCT
Utah Valley	15	–	1	.938	25	–	9	.735
Grand Canyon †	13	–	3	.813	26	–	8	.765
California Baptist	9	–	7	.563	17	–	15	.531
Abilene Christian	8	–	8	.500	16	–	16	.500
Seattle	8	–	8	.500	14	–	18	.438
Tarleton State	7	–	9	.438	12	–	20	.375
UT Arlington	6	–	10	.375	13	–	18	.419
Southern Utah	4	–	12	.250	12	–	19	.387
Utah Tech	2	–	14	.125	7	–	26	.212
† 2025 WAC tournament winner

The 2024–25 Seattle Redhawks men's basketball team represented Seattle University in the 2024–25 NCAA Division I men's basketball season. They were led by fourth-year head coach Chris Victor and played their games on campus at the Redhawk Center and off campus at Climate Pledge Arena. They competed as members of the Western Athletic Conference. This was the Redhawks’ last season as a member of the Western Athletic Conference, as they will join the West Coast Conference effective July 1, 2025.

== Previous season ==
The Redhawks finished the season 23–14, 11–9 in conference play to finish in fourth place. In the WAC tournament, the team won their quarterfinals game against California Baptist before losing to Grand Canyon in the semifinals. The Redhawks were invited to the CBI tournament, where they defeated Delaware State, Evansville, Fairfield, and High Point to win the CBI championship, the program's first postseason tournament championship.

== Roster ==
2024–25 Seattle Redhawks men's basketball team
Players
Coaches

Pos.	#	Name	Height	Weight	Year	Hometown
G	0	Brayden Maldonado	6 ft 0 in (1.83 m)	171 lb (78 kg)	Jr	Anchorage, Alaska
G	1	Maleek Arington	6 ft 3 in (1.91 m)	207 lb (94 kg)	Jr	Auburn, Washington
G	2	Paris Dawson	6 ft 2 in (1.88 m)	170 lb (77 kg)	Sr	Carson, California
G	5	DaSean Stevens	6 ft 3 in (1.91 m)	180 lb (82 kg)	Jr	Redlands, California
C	6	Houran Dan	6 ft 10 in (2.08 m)	228 lb (103 kg)	Fr	Neimenggu, China
G	7	Vasja Pandža	6 ft 8 in (2.03 m)	218 lb (99 kg)	Sr	Leeds, England
F	8	Malik Gomma	6 ft 8 in (2.03 m)	245 lb (111 kg)	So	Seattle, Washington
F	10	Ray Adams	6 ft 8 in (2.03 m)	193 lb (88 kg)	Fr	Olympia, Washington
G	11	John Cristofilis	6 ft 3 in (1.91 m)	204 lb (93 kg)	RS Jr	Seattle, Washington
F	12	Matthew-Alexander Moncrieffe	6 ft 8 in (2.03 m)	214 lb (97 kg)	GS	Toronto, Canada
F	15	Will Heimbrodt	6 ft 7 in (2.01 m)	220 lb (100 kg)	RS Fr	San Anselmo, California
G	19	Eric Zheng	5 ft 10 in (1.78 m)	167 lb (76 kg)	Fr	Beijing, China
F	21	Viktor Rajković	6 ft 6 in (1.98 m)	225 lb (102 kg)	Sr	Mill Valley, California
F	25	Yuko Kawashima	6 ft 9 in (2.06 m)	215 lb (98 kg)	Fr	Gunma, Japan
G	30	Niko Fotopoulos	6 ft 3 in (1.91 m)	175 lb (79 kg)	RS So	Seattle, Washington
F	96	Kobe Williamson	6 ft 8 in (2.03 m)	245 lb (111 kg)	Sr	Melbourne, Australia

Head coach

- Chris Victor (Concordia–Irvine)

Assistant coach(es)

- Grant Leep (Washington)
- D'Marques Tyson (Portland)
- Steven Shpreyrengin (Washington State)
- Colin Rardin (Pacific)
- Bryce Douglas (Puget Sound)

Legend

- (C) Team captain
- (S) Suspended
- (I) Ineligible
- (W) Walk-on
- Injured
- Current redshirt

Roster
Last update: November 28, 2024

== Schedule and results ==
Date time, TV	Rank^{#}	Opponent^{#}	Result	Record	Site (attendance) city, state
Non-conference regular season
November 6, 2024*; 6:00 p.m., ESPN+		at Eastern Washington	L 86–93	0–1	Reese Court (1,492); Cheney, WA
November 9, 2024*; 5:00 p.m., ESPN+		Liberty	L 64–66	0–2	Redhawk Center (999); Seattle, WA
November 14, 2024*; 7:00 p.m., ESPN+		at Cal Poly	L 71–75	0–3	Robert A. Mott Athletics Center (1,623); San Luis Obispo, CA
November 16, 2024*; 7:00 p.m., ESPN+		at UC San Diego	W 84–71	1–3	LionTree Arena (1,026); La Jolla, CA
November 22, 2024*; 7:00 p.m., ESPN+		Northwest U	W 80–52	2–3	Redhawk Center (999); Seattle, WA
November 26, 2024*; 8:30 p.m., ESPNU		vs. Furman; Vegas Showdown	L 56–61	2–4	T-Mobile Arena (14,757); Las Vegas, NV
November 29, 2024*; 4:00 p.m., ACCN		at No. 11 Duke; Vegas Showdown campus game	L 48–70	2–5	Cameron Indoor Stadium (9,314); Durham, NC
December 4, 2024*; 7:00 p.m., ESPN+		Portland State	W 91–74	3–5	Climate Pledge Arena (1,194); Seattle, WA
December 7, 2024*; 1:00 p.m., ESPNU		at UTEP	L 72–88	3–6	Don Haskins Center (4,522); El Paso, TX
December 14, 2024*; 5:00 p.m., ESPN+		Pacific (OR)	W 111–44	4–6	Redhawk Center (688); Seattle, WA
December 17, 2024*; 5:00 p.m., ESPNU		at Western Kentucky	L 73–86	4–7	E. A. Diddle Arena (2,702); Bowling Green, KY
December 20, 2024*; 2:00 p.m., ESPN+		UIC	L 68–79	4–8	Redhawk Center (852); Seattle, WA
December 23, 2024*; 7:00 p.m., BTN		at Washington; Rivalry	W 79–70	5–8	Alaska Airlines Arena (7,228); Seattle, WA
December 30, 2024*; 7:00 p.m., ESPN+		Nicholls	L 69–71	5–9	Redhawk Center (840); Seattle, WA
WAC regular season
January 4, 2025; 5:00 p.m., ESPN+		at California Baptist	L 59–61	5–10 (0–1)	Fowler Events Center (2,611); Riverside, CA
January 11, 2025; 7:00 p.m., ESPN+		Abilene Christian	W 66–64	6–10 (1–1)	Climate Pledge Arena (1,461); Seattle, WA
January 16, 2025; 7:00 p.m., ESPN+		Utah Tech	W 82–62	7–10 (2–1)	Redhawk Center (949); Seattle, WA
January 18, 2025; 5:00 p.m., ESPN+		Southern Utah	W 75–52	8–10 (3–1)	Redhawk Center (772); Seattle, WA
January 23, 2025; 5:00 p.m., ESPN+		at UT Arlington	L 56–65	8–11 (3–2)	College Park Center; Arlington, TX
January 25, 2025; 7:00 p.m., ESPN+		Utah Valley	L 66–70	8–12 (3–3)	Redhawk Center; Seattle, WA
January 30, 2025; 8:00 p.m., ESPNU		at Grand Canyon	L 74–83	8–13 (3–4)	Global Credit Union Arena; Phoenix, AZ
February 6, 2025; 7:00 p.m., ESPN+		Tarleton State	W 91–54	9–13 (4–4)	Redhawk Center (707); Seattle, WA
February 8, 2025; 5:00 p.m., ESPN+		UT Arlington	W 67–65	10–13 (5–4)	Redhawk Center (999); Seattle, WA
February 13, 2025; 5:00 p.m., ESPN+		at Abilene Christian	L 59–75	10–14 (5–5)	Moody Coliseum (1,346); Abilene, TX
February 15, 2025; 5:00 p.m., ESPN+		at Tarleton State	L 64–67	10–15 (5–6)	Wisdom Gymnasium (2,123); Stephenville, TX
February 22, 2025; 1:00 p.m., ESPN+		at Utah Valley	L 55–61	10–16 (5–7)	UCCU Center (2,813); Orem, UT
February 27, 2025; 7:00 p.m., ESPN+		California Baptist	W 72–48	11–16 (6–7)	Redhawk Center (864); Seattle, WA
March 1, 2025; 7:00 p.m., ESPN+		Grand Canyon	L 60–63	11–17 (6–8)	Redhawk Center (999); Seattle, WA
March 6, 2025; 5:30 p.m., ESPN+		at Southern Utah	W 62–39	12–17 (7–8)	America First Event Center (1,074); Cedar City, UT
March 8, 2025; 6:00 p.m., ESPN+		at Utah Tech	W 70–65	13–17 (8–8)	Burns Arena (1,556); St. George, UT
WAC tournament
March 13, 2025; 6:00 p.m., ESPN+	(5)	at (4) Abilene Christian; Quarterfinal	W 69–63	14–17 (8–8)	Orleans Arena; Las Vegas, NV
March 14, 2025; 6:00 p.m., ESPN+	(5)	at (1) Utah Valley; Semifinal	L 55–68	14–18 (8–8)	Orleans Arena (3,867); Las Vegas, NV
*Non-conference game. ^{#}Rankings from AP poll. (#) Tournament seedings in parentheses. All times are in Pacific Standard Time.
