= 2024–25 Southern Utah Thunderbirds men's basketball team =

American college basketball season

2024–25 Southern Utah Thunderbirds men's basketball
- Conference: Western Athletic Conference
- Record: 12–19 (4–12 WAC)
- Head coach: Rob Jeter (2nd season)
- Associate head coach: Donald Williams
- Assistant coaches: Allan Hanson; Shaun Gutting; Tennessee Owens
- Home arena: America First Event Center

2024–25 WAC men's basketball standings
| | Conf. | | | | Overall |
| Team | W | | L | PCT | W | | L | PCT |
|---|---|---|---|---|---|---|---|---|
| Utah Valley | 15 | – | 1 | .938 | 25 | – | 9 | .735 |
| Grand Canyon † | 13 | – | 3 | .813 | 26 | – | 8 | .765 |
| California Baptist | 9 | – | 7 | .563 | 17 | – | 15 | .531 |
| Abilene Christian | 8 | – | 8 | .500 | 16 | – | 16 | .500 |
| Seattle | 8 | – | 8 | .500 | 14 | – | 18 | .438 |
| Tarleton State | 7 | – | 9 | .438 | 12 | – | 20 | .375 |
| UT Arlington | 6 | – | 10 | .375 | 13 | – | 18 | .419 |
| Southern Utah | 4 | – | 12 | .250 | 12 | – | 19 | .387 |
| Utah Tech | 2 | – | 14 | .125 | 7 | – | 26 | .212 |
† 2025 WAC tournament winner

The 2024–25 Southern Utah Thunderbirds men's basketball team represented Southern Utah University in the 2024–25 NCAA Division I men's basketball season. The Thunderbirds, led by second-year head coach Rob Jeter, played their games at America First Event Center in Cedar City, Utah as members of the Western Athletic Conference (WAC).

The Thunderbirds finished the season 12–19, 4–12 in WAC play, to finish in eighth place. Their season ended in a first-round loss to Utah Tech in the WAC tournament.

== Previous season ==
The Thunderbirds finished the 2023–24 season 10–21, 5–15 in WAC play, to finish in tenth place. They failed to qualify for the WAC tournament, as only the top eight teams are eligible to compete.

== Roster ==
2024–25 Southern Utah Thunderbirds men's basketball team
Players
Coaches

| Pos. | # | Name | Height | Weight | Year | Previous school | Hometown |
|---|---|---|---|---|---|---|---|
| G | 0 | Xavier Sykes | 5 ft 10 in (1.78 m) | — | Jr | Moberly Area CC | Columbia, MO |
| SG | 1 | Dominique Ford | 6 ft 5 in (1.96 m) | — | Sr | Idaho | Las Vegas, NV |
| G | 2 | Tavi Jackson | 6 ft 2 in (1.88 m) | — | Jr | Colorado State | Las Vegas, NV |
| G/F | 3 | Jamir Simpson | 6 ft 5 in (1.96 m) | — | Sr | Wisconsin–Parkside | Lima, OH |
| G | 4 | Lorenzo Abellar | 5 ft 10 in (1.78 m) | — | Jr | College of Southern Nevada | Las Vegas, NV |
| F | 5 | Javion Langston | 6 ft 8 in (2.03 m) | — | So | East Los Angeles College | Fort Wayne, IN |
| F | 6 | Josh Jackman | 6 ft 10 in (2.08 m) | — | Fr | Ridgeline High School | Providence, UT |
| F | 7 | Jeffrey (JT) Jr. Langston | 6 ft 8 in (2.03 m) | — | Sr | Rider | Fort Wayne, IN |
| G | 8 | Shawn Mitchell | 6 ft 0 in (1.83 m) | — | Fr | Good Vision Academy | Katy, TX |
| G | 10 | Peter Jr. Dadson | 6 ft 4 in (1.93 m) | — | Jr | Hillcrest Prep | Sydney, Australia |
| G | 11 | Langston Binns | 6 ft 2 in (1.88 m) | — | Jr | Central Lakes College | St. Paul, MN |
| F | 12 | Mason Johnson | 6 ft 6 in (1.98 m) | — | RS Sr | MATC | Milwaukee, WI |
| PG | 13 | Tainui Taiaroa | 6 ft 7 in (2.01 m) | — | So | ABC Prep | Las Cruces, NM |
| F | 14 | Jamari Sibley | 6 ft 8 in (2.03 m) | — | Sr | UTEP | Milwaukee, WI |
| G | 15 | Hercy Miller | 6 ft 3 in (1.91 m) | — | Sr | Louisville | Los Angeles, CA |
| PG | 21 | Robert Jeter | 6 ft 0 in (1.83 m) | — | Sr | Western Illinois | Madison, WI |
| SG | 23 | Duncan Reid | 6 ft 4 in (1.93 m) | — | RS Fr | Skyridge High School | Highland, UT |
| C | 25 | Kai Burdick | 7 ft 0 in (2.13 m) | — | Jr | MiraCosta College | Carlsbad, CA |
| C | 32 | Malik Lamin | 6 ft 11 in (2.11 m) | — | Sr | Grambling State | Champlin, MN |
| PF | 33 | Brock Felder | 6 ft 8 in (2.03 m) | — | So | Parowan High School | Parowan, UT |
| G | 55 | Cade Brazier | 6 ft 0 in (1.83 m) | — | Sr | Salt Lake CC | Huntington, UT |

Head coach

- Rob Jeter (UW–Platteville)

Assistant coach(es)

- Donald Williams (Cal State Hayward)
- Allan Hanson (Milwaukee)
- Shaun Gutting (Colorado State)
- Tennessee Owens (New Mexico State)

Legend

- (C) Team captain
- (S) Suspended
- (I) Ineligible
- (W) Walk-on
- Injured
- Current redshirt

Roster
Last update: November 30, 2024

== Schedule and results ==
| Date time, TV | Rank^{#} | Opponent^{#} | Result | Record | High points | High rebounds | High assists | Site (attendance) city, state |
Exhibition
| October 28, 2024*; 6:30 p.m. | | Westminster | W 66–49 | – | 19 – Jackson | 9 – 2 tied | 3 – Jackson | America First Event Center (665); Cedar City, UT |
Non-conference regular season
| November 4, 2024*; 6:30 p.m., ESPN+ | | Western New Mexico | W 96–68 | 1–0 | 18 – Sibley | 10 – Sibley | 4 – Ford | America First Event Center (1,486); Cedar City, UT |
| November 9, 2024*; 6:30 p.m., ESPN+ | | FIU | W 80–75 | 2–0 | 18 – Miller | 9 – Jackson | 4 – Jackson | America First Event Center (2,856); Cedar City, UT |
| November 12, 2024*; 6:30 p.m., ESPN+ | | Bethesda (CA) | W 107–54 | 3–0 | 12 – Sykes | 7 – 2 tied | 7 – Abellar | America First Event Center (965); Cedar City, UT |
| November 16, 2024*; 6:30 p.m., ESPN+ | | Omaha | W 79–73 | 4–0 | 25 – Simpson | 10 – Sibley | 5 – Jackson | America First Event Center (1,006); Cedar City, UT |
| November 19, 2024*; 7:30 p.m., ESPN+ | | at Loyola Chicago | L 72–76 | 4–1 | 28 – Simpson | 10 – Sibley | 4 – Sibley | Joseph J. Gentile Arena (2,318); Chicago, IL |
| November 22, 2024*; 7:00 p.m., ESPN+ | | at San Diego; San Diego MTE | W 72–67 | 5–1 | 20 – Simpson | 13 – Felder | 7 – Jackson | Jenny Craig Pavilion (380); San Diego, CA |
| November 23, 2024*; 2:00 p.m., ESPN+ | | vs. Idaho; San Diego MTE | W 82–67 | 6–1 | 21 – Simpson | 4 – 4 tied | 5 – Jackson | Jenny Craig Pavilion (148); San Diego, CA |
| November 26, 2024*; 7:00 p.m., BTN | | at UCLA | L 43–88 | 6–2 | 10 – Sykes | 4 – Lamin | 3 – Abellar | Pauley Pavilion (4,311); Los Angeles, CA |
| November 30, 2024*; 6:30 p.m., ESPN+ | | Cal State Bakersfield | W 74–64 | 7–2 | 21 – Simpson | 9 – Langston Jr. | 3 – Abellar | America First Event Center (995); Cedar City, UT |
| December 3, 2024*; 6:30 p.m., ESPN+ | | Park (Gilbert) | W 90–55 | 8–2 | 14 – Langston Jr. | 7 – 3 tied | 3 – Abellar | America First Event Center (900); Cedar City, UT |
| December 7, 2024*; 12:00 p.m., ESPN+ | | at Arizona | L 66–102 | 8–3 | 21 – Simpson | 7 – Simpson | 4 – Simpson | McKale Center (13,747); Tucson, AZ |
| December 16, 2024*; 7:00 p.m., ESPN+ | | at New Mexico State | L 69–72 | 8–4 | 19 – Ford | 7 – Felder | 4 – Simpson | Pan American Center (3,998); Las Cruces, NM |
| December 18, 2024*; 5:30 p.m., ESPN+ | | at UT Rio Grande Valley | L 73–78 | 8–5 | 20 – Simpson | 6 – 3 tied | 5 – Abellar | UTRGV Fieldhouse (1,637); Edinburg, TX |
| December 21, 2024*; 2:00 p.m., ESPN+ | | Northern Arizona | L 75–83 | 8–6 | 20 – Simpson | 9 – Simpson | 3 – 4 tied | America First Event Center (741); Cedar City, UT |
WAC regular season
| January 4, 2025; 6:00 p.m., ESPN+ | | at Grand Canyon | L 71–82 | 8–7 (0–1) | 22 – Ford | 6 – Ford | 9 – Jackson | GCU Arena (7,398); Phoenix, AZ |
| January 9, 2025; 6:30 p.m., ESPN+ | | Tarleton State | L 66–74 | 8–8 (0–2) | 21 – Ford | 7 – Felder | 2 – 4 tied | America First Event Center (1,453); Cedar City, UT |
| January 11, 2025; 6:30 p.m., ESPN+ | | UT Arlington | W 73–68 | 9–8 (1–2) | 26 – Ford | 5 – 2 tied | 5 – Jackson | America First Event Center (1,061); Cedar City, UT |
| January 18, 2025; 6:00 p.m., ESPN+ | | at Seattle | L 52–75 | 9–9 (1–3) | 15 – Simpson | 8 – Jackson | 2 – 2 tied | Redhawk Center (772); Seattle, WA |
| January 23, 2025; 6:30 p.m., ESPN+ | | Grand Canyon | L 59–74 | 9–10 (1–4) | 21 – Simpson | 6 – 2 tied | 3 – Simpson | America First Event Center; Cedar City, UT |
| January 25, 2025; 6:30 p.m., ESPN+ | | California Baptist | L 60–76 | 9–11 (1–5) | 17 – Simpson | 9 – Miller | 2 – 2 tied | America First Event Center (1,253); Cedar City, UT |
| January 30, 2025; 6:00 p.m., ESPN+ | | at UT Arlington | L 68–70 | 9–12 (1–6) | 20 – Simpson | 13 – Felder | 3 – 2 tied | College Park Center (1,450); Arlington, TX |
| February 1, 2025; 6:00 p.m., ESPN+ | | at Tarleton State | L 58–75 | 9–13 (1–7) | 24 – Simpson | 5 – Felder | 2 – Simpson | Wisdom Gym (1,312); Stephenville, TX |
| February 6, 2025; 8:00 p.m., ESPN+ | | at California Baptist | W 60–57 | 10–13 (2–7) | 22 – Simpson | 7 – 2 tied | 2 – Felder | Fowler Events Center (2,865); Riverside, CA |
| February 8, 2025; 6:30 p.m., ESPN+ | | Abilene Christian | L 70–84 | 10–14 (2–8) | 14 – Simpson | 10 – Felder | 5 – Abellar | America First Event Center (989); Cedar City, UT |
| February 13, 2025; 6:30 p.m., ESPN+ | | Utah Tech | W 76–74 | 11–14 (3–8) | 17 – Simpson | 7 – Felder | 3 – 2 tied | America First Event Center (2,414); Cedar City, UT |
| February 15, 2025; 6:30 p.m., ESPN+ | | Utah Valley | L 68–70 | 11–15 (3–9) | 28 – Ford | 7 – Simpson | 5 – Simpson | America First Event Center (1,555); Cedar City, UT |
| February 20, 2025; 6:00 p.m., ESPN+ | | at Abilene Christian | L 59–75 | 11–16 (3–10) | 15 – Simpson | 7 – Burdick | 3 – Abellar | Moody Coliseum (1,484); Abilene, TX |
| February 27, 2025; 7:00 p.m., ESPN+ | | at Utah Tech | W 82–75 | 12–16 (4–10) | 29 – Ford | 7 – Felder | 7 – Abellar | Burns Arena (3,185); St. George, UT |
| March 1, 2025; 2:00 p.m., ESPN+ | | Utah Valley | L 59–100 | 12–17 (4–11) | 11 – Felder | 7 – Felder | 4 – Simpson | UCCU Center (3,449); Orem, UT |
| March 6, 2025; 6:30 p.m., ESPN+ | | Seattle | L 39–62 | 12–18 (4–12) | 9 – 2 tied | 7 – Burdick | 3 – Abellar | America First Event Center (1,074); Cedar City, UT |
WAC tournament
| March 11, 2025; 2:30 p.m., ESPN+ | (8) | at (9) Utah Tech; First round | L 65–72 | 12–19 | 16 – Ford | 9 – Felder | 3 – Ford | Burns Arena (1,022); St. George, UT |
*Non-conference game. ^{#}Rankings from AP poll. (#) Tournament seedings in parentheses. All times are in Mountain.
