= 2024–25 Utah Valley Wolverines men's basketball team =

Intercollegiate basketball season

2024–25 Utah Valley Wolverines men's basketball

WAC regular season champions

NIT, First round
- Conference: Western Athletic Conference
- Record: 25–9 (15–1 WAC)
- Head coach: Todd Phillips (2nd season)
- Associate head coach: Todd Okeson (6th season)
- Assistant coaches: Rosbie Mutcherson (2nd season); Adam Jacobsen (1st season)
- Home arena: UCCU Center (Capacity: 8,500)

2024–25 WAC men's basketball standings
	Conf.				Overall
Team	W		L	PCT	W		L	PCT
Utah Valley	15	–	1	.938	25	–	9	.735
Grand Canyon †	13	–	3	.813	26	–	8	.765
California Baptist	9	–	7	.563	17	–	15	.531
Abilene Christian	8	–	8	.500	16	–	16	.500
Seattle	8	–	8	.500	14	–	18	.438
Tarleton State	7	–	9	.438	12	–	20	.375
UT Arlington	6	–	10	.375	13	–	18	.419
Southern Utah	4	–	12	.250	12	–	19	.387
Utah Tech	2	–	14	.125	7	–	26	.212
† 2025 WAC tournament winner

The 2024–25 Utah Valley Wolverines men's basketball team represented Utah Valley University in the 2024–25 NCAA Division I men's basketball season. The Wolverines, led by second-year head coach Todd Phillips, played their home games at the UCCU Center in Orem, Utah, and competed as members of the Western Athletic Conference (WAC).

== Previous season ==
The Wolverines finished the 2023–24 season 16–16, 11–9 in WAC play, to finish in a tie for fourth place. As the No. 5 seed in the WAC tournament, they lost to California Baptist in the first round.

== Offseason ==
=== Departures ===
Name	Position	Height	Year	Reason for departure
Trevin Dorius	C	7' 1"	Senior	Graduated
Cache Fields	G	6' 6"	Senior	Graduated
Jaden McClanahan	G	5' 10"	Senior	Graduated
McCaden Adams	G	6' 3"	Freshman	Transferred to Snow College
Simon Akena	G	6' 6"	Junior	Transferred to Westminster University
Drake Allen	G	6' 4"	Junior	Transferred to Utah State
Peter Amakasu	G	6' 4"	Freshman	Initially committed to Snow College; ultimately transferred to Westminster University
K'Mani Doughty	G	6' 5"	Junior	Transferred to Indiana State
Caleb Stone-Carrawell	F	6' 7"	Senior	Transferred to Loyola Marymount
Nate Tshimanga	F	6' 10"	Junior	Transferred to New Mexico State

=== Incoming transfers ===
Name	Position	Height	Year	Previous school
Kylin Green	G	6' 0"	Junior	Daytona State
Andre Johnson Jr.	G	6' 4"	Junior	UConn
Dominick Nelson	G	6' 5"	Junior	Polk State College
Noah Taitz	G	6' 4"	Senior	Loyola Marymount
Carter Welling	F	6' 10"	Sophomore	UC Irvine
Hayden Welling	F	6' 9"	Sophomore	UC Irvine
Cory Wells	F	6' 7"	Senior	Xavier University of Louisiana
Majer Sullivan	C	6' 8"	Junior	Yuba College

== Roster ==
2024–25 Utah Valley Wolverines men's basketball team
Players
Coaches

Pos.	#	Name	Height	Weight	Year	Previous school	Hometown
G	0	Dominick Nelson	6 ft 5 in (1.96 m)	180 lb (82 kg)	Jr	Liberty Heights Athletic Institute; Polk State	Miami, FL
G	1	Andre Johnson Jr.	6 ft 4 in (1.93 m)	182 lb (83 kg)	Jr	South Kent HS; UConn	Bristol, CT
G	2	Jackson Holcombe	6 ft 6 in (1.98 m)	200 lb (91 kg)	So	Timpanogos HS	Orem, UT
G	3	Kylin Green	6 ft 0 in (1.83 m)	175 lb (79 kg)	Jr	Lewisville HS; Daytona State	Dallas, TX
F	4	Tyler Medaris (W)	6 ft 7 in (2.01 m)	205 lb (93 kg)	Fr	Middleton, HS	Middleton, ID
G	5	Tanner Toolson	6 ft 5 in (1.96 m)	195 lb (88 kg)	RS So	Union HS; BYU	Vancouver, WA
G	6	Jake Nadauld (W)	6 ft 2 in (1.88 m)	175 lb (79 kg)	Fr	Springville HS	Springville, UT
G	7	Noah Taitz	6 ft 4 in (1.93 m)	190 lb (86 kg)	RS Sr	Bishop Gorman HS; Loyola Marymount	Las Vegas, NV
F	8	Hayden Welling	6 ft 9 in (2.06 m)	210 lb (95 kg)	Jr	Corner Canyon HS; UC Irvine	Draper, UT
G	10	Trevan Leonhardt	6 ft 4 in (1.93 m)	175 lb (79 kg)	RS So	Davis HS	Kaysville, UT
F	11	Tyler Weaver (W)	6 ft 7 in (2.01 m)	175 lb (79 kg)	Fr	Aliso Niguel HS	Aliso Viejo, CA
F	12	Osiris Grady	6 ft 8 in (2.03 m)	215 lb (98 kg)	So	Wasatch Academy	Las Vegas, NV
F	13	Cory Wells	6 ft 7 in (2.01 m)	200 lb (91 kg)	Sr	Wylie HS; Xavier University of Louisiana	Murphy, TX
F	22	Carter Welling	6 ft 10 in (2.08 m)	225 lb (102 kg)	So	Corner Canyon HS; UC Irvine	Draper, UT
G	23	Dylan Metoyer (W)	6 ft 1 in (1.85 m)	180 lb (82 kg)	Fr	Sierra Canyon HS	Chatsworth, CA
C	32	Majer Sullivan	6 ft 8 in (2.03 m)	245 lb (111 kg)	Jr	Antelope HS; Yuba College	Sacramento, CA
F	35	Ethan Potter	6 ft 8 in (2.03 m)	205 lb (93 kg)	Jr	Layton HS	Layton, UT

Head coach

- Todd Phillips (Lewis–Clark State)

Assistant coach(es)

- Todd Okeson (Nevada)
- Rosbie Mutcherson (Covenant)
- Adam Jacobsen (Pacific)

Strength and conditioning coach(es)

- Kaleb John-Lewis

Athletic trainer(s)

- Troyce Solley

Legend

- (C) Team captain
- (S) Suspended
- (I) Ineligible
- (W) Walk-on
- Injured
- Current redshirt

Roster
Last update: December 12, 2024

== Schedule and results ==
Date time, TV	Rank^{#}	Opponent^{#}	Result	Record	Site (attendance) city, state
Non-conference regular season
November 4, 2024*; 6:00 p.m., ESPN+		Western Colorado	W 92–57	1–0	UCCU Center (2,075); Orem, UT
November 9, 2024*; 2:00 p.m., ESPN+		UTEP; WAC/C-USA Alliance	W 89–60	2–0	UCCU Center (1,653); Orem, UT
November 14, 2024*; 11:00 a.m., Midco		at North Dakota	L 71–77	2–1	Betty Engelstad Sioux Center (2,131); Grand Forks, ND
November 22, 2024*; 6:00 p.m., ESPN+		at Murray State	W 77–75	3–1	CFSB Center (5,037); Murray, KY
November 26, 2024*; 2:00 p.m.		vs. West Georgia; Samford MTE	W 77–74	4–1	Pete Hanna Center (177); Homewood, AL
November 27, 2024*; 5:30 p.m., ESPN+		at Samford; Samford MTE	L 76–84	4–2	Pete Hanna Center (913); Homewood, AL
November 28, 2024*; 1:00 p.m., ESPN+		vs. North Dakota State; Samford MTE	L 63–83	4–3	Pete Hanna Center (121); Homewood, AL
December 3, 2024*; 8:00 p.m., ACCN		at Stanford	L 63–77	4–4	Maples Pavilion (2,033); Stanford, CA
December 7, 2024*; 2:00 p.m., ESPN+		at James Madison	L 61–78	4–5	Atlantic Union Bank Center (3,726); Harrisonburg, VA
December 11, 2024*; 6:00 p.m., ESPN+		North Dakota	W 80–57	5–5	UCCU Center (2,135); Orem, UT
December 14, 2024*; 3:00 p.m., ESPN+		at Jacksonville State; WAC/C-USA Alliance	L 66–70	5–6	Pete Mathews Coliseum (1,033); Jacksonville, AL
December 18, 2024*; 7:00 p.m., ESPN+		at Idaho State	W 70–56	6–6	Reed Gym (1,127); Pocatello, ID
December 21, 2024*; 7:00 p.m., ESPN+		at Weber State	W 64–62	7–6	Dee Events Center (3,609); Ogden, UT
December 28, 2024*; 2:00 p.m., ESPN+		Bethesda (CA)	W 119–59	8–6	UCCU Center (1,463); Orem, UT
WAC regular season
January 4, 2025; 2:00 p.m., ESPN+		Abilene Christian	W 64–53	9–6 (1–0)	UCCU Center (1,601); Orem, UT
January 9, 2025; 6:00 p.m., ESPN+		Grand Canyon	W 72–64	10–6 (2–0)	UCCU Center (2,351); Orem, UT
January 11, 2025; 2:00 p.m., ESPN+		California Baptist	W 75–69	11–6 (3–0)	UCCU Center (1,863); Orem, UT
January 16, 2025; 6:00 p.m., ESPN+		at UT Arlington	W 85–83 ^{OT}	12–6 (4–0)	College Park Center (1,824); Arlington, TX
January 18, 2025; 2:00 p.m., ESPN+		Utah Tech; Old Hammer Rivalry	W 96–80	13–6 (5–0)	UCCU Center (2,334); Orem, UT
January 23, 2025; 8:00 p.m., ESPNU		at California Baptist	W 74–69	14–6 (6–0)	Fowler Events Center (3,867); Riverside, CA
January 25, 2025; 6:00 p.m., ESPN+		at Seattle	W 70–66	15–6 (7–0)	Redhawk Center (999); Seattle, WA
February 1, 2025; 6:00 p.m., ESPN+		at Grand Canyon	L 57–75	15–7 (7–1)	GCU Arena (7,219); Phoenix, AZ
February 6, 2025; 6:00 p.m., ESPN+		UT Arlington	W 94–73	16–7 (8–1)	UCCU Center (2,681); Orem, UT
February 8, 2025; 2:00 p.m., ESPN+		Tarleton	W 81–56	17–7 (9–1)	UCCU Center (1,676); Orem, UT
February 15, 2025; 6:30 p.m., ESPN+		at Southern Utah	W 70–68	18–7 (10–1)	America First Event Center (1,555); Cedar City, UT
February 20, 2025; 7:00 p.m., ESPN+		at Utah Tech; Old Hammer Rivalry	W 79–77 ^{OT}	19–7 (11–1)	Burns Arena (1,984); St. George, UT
February 22, 2025; 2:00 p.m., ESPN+		Seattle	W 61–55	20–7 (12–1)	UCCU Center (2,813); Orem, UT
March 1, 2025; 2:00 p.m., ESPN+		Southern Utah	W 100–59	21–7 (13–1)	UCCU Center (3,449); Orem, UT
March 6, 2025; 6:00 p.m., ESPN+		at Abilene Christian	W 73–60	22–7 (14–1)	Moody Coliseum (1,523); Abilene, TX
March 8, 2025; 6:00 p.m., ESPN+		at Tarleton	W 71–66	23–7 (15–1)	Wisdom Gym (3,000); Stephenville, TX
WAC tournament
March 12, 2025; 7:00 p.m., ESPN+	(1)	vs. (9) Utah Tech; Quarterfinals/Old Hammer Rivalry	W 74–57	24–7	Orleans Arena (1,645); Paradise, NV
March 14, 2025; 7:00 p.m., ESPN+	(1)	vs. (5) Seattle; Semifinals	W 68–55	25–7	Orleans Arena (3,867); Paradise, NV
March 15, 2025; 9:40 p.m., ESPN2	(1)	vs. (2) Grand Canyon; Championship	L 82–89	25–8	Orleans Arena (3,780); Paradise, NV
NIT
March 19, 2025; 9:00 p.m., ESPNU		at (1) San Francisco; First round – San Francisco Region	L 70–79	25–9	Sobrato Center (1,309); San Francisco, CA
*Non-conference game. ^{#}Rankings from AP poll. (#) Tournament seedings in parentheses. All times are in Mountain.

== See also ==
- 2024–25 Utah Valley Wolverines women's basketball team
