= 2024–25 Abilene Christian Wildcats men's basketball team =

Basketball team season

2024–25 Abilene Christian Wildcats men's basketball
- Conference: Western Athletic Conference
- Record: 16–16 (8–8 WAC)
- Head coach: Brette Tanner (4th season)
- Assistant coaches: Cinco Boone; Ted Crass; Cameron Henderson; Doug Karleskint; Jon Trilli
- Home arena: Moody Coliseum

2024–25 WAC men's basketball standings
	Conf.				Overall
Team	W		L	PCT	W		L	PCT
Utah Valley	15	–	1	.938	25	–	9	.735
Grand Canyon †	13	–	3	.813	26	–	8	.765
California Baptist	9	–	7	.563	17	–	15	.531
Abilene Christian	8	–	8	.500	16	–	16	.500
Seattle	8	–	8	.500	14	–	18	.438
Tarleton State	7	–	9	.438	12	–	20	.375
UT Arlington	6	–	10	.375	13	–	18	.419
Southern Utah	4	–	12	.250	12	–	19	.387
Utah Tech	2	–	14	.125	7	–	26	.212
† 2025 WAC tournament winner

The 2024–25 Abilene Christian Wildcats men's basketball team represented Abilene Christian University during the 2024–25 NCAA Division I men's basketball season. The Wildcats, led by fourth-year head coach Brette Tanner, played their home games at Moody Coliseum in Abilene, Texas as members of the Western Athletic Conference (WAC). The Wildcats finished the season 16–16, 8–8 in WAC play, to finish in a tie for fourth place. They were defeated by Seattle in the quarterfinals of the WAC tournament.

== Previous season ==
The Wildcats finished the 2023–24 season 15–16, 10–10 in WAC play, to finish in a tie for sixth place. As the No. 7 seed in the WAC tournament, they lost to Stephen F. Austin in the first round. They received an invitation to the CIT, where they defeated Texas A&M–Corpus Christi in the first round before losing to fellow WAC member Tarleton in the quarterfinals.

== Roster ==
2024–25 Abilene Christian Wildcats men's basketball team
Players
Coaches

Pos.	#	Name	Height	Weight	Year	Previous school	Hometown
G	0	Nasir DeGruy	6 ft 4 in (1.93 m)	180 lb (82 kg)	Jr	LSU Eunice	New Orleans, LA
G	1	Colby Tanner	5 ft 10 in (1.78 m)	160 lb (73 kg)	Jr	Wylie HS	Abilene, TX
G	2	Yaniel Rivera	6 ft 4 in (1.93 m)	175 lb (79 kg)	So	Dade Christian School	Bayamón, Puerto Rico
F	3	Leonardo Bettiol	6 ft 8 in (2.03 m)	214 lb (97 kg)	Jr	Liceo Duca degli Abruzzi	Roncade, Italy
G	4	Rich Smith	6 ft 4 in (1.93 m)	175 lb (79 kg)	Jr	St. Thomas Aquinas	The Bronx, NY
G	5	Quion Williams	6 ft 5 in (1.96 m)	220 lb (100 kg)	Jr	Oklahoma State	Jonesboro, AR
G	6	Dontrez Williams	6 ft 5 in (1.96 m)	180 lb (82 kg)	Fr	Sikeston HS	Sikeston, MO
G	7	Christian Alston	6 ft 5 in (1.96 m)	165 lb (75 kg)	Fr	Bartlett HS	Memphis, TN
F	10	Jack Sawyer	6 ft 8 in (2.03 m)	195 lb (88 kg)	Fr	Aledo HS	Aledo, TX
F	11	Ma'Shy Hill	6 ft 9 in (2.06 m)	240 lb (109 kg)	So	Spire Institute Academy	Austin, TX
F	12	Cade Hornecker	7 ft 0 in (2.13 m)	240 lb (109 kg)	RS So	Southern Illinois	Amarillo, TX
F	15	Bradyn Hubbard	6 ft 7 in (2.01 m)	225 lb (102 kg)	Jr	Connors State	Tulsa, OK
G	21	Hunter Jack Madden	6 ft 2 in (1.88 m)	190 lb (86 kg)	Sr	Otero College	Sydney, Australia
G	23	Joseph Venzant	6 ft 3 in (1.91 m)	170 lb (77 kg)	Sr	Liberty	Midland, TX

Head coach

- Brette Tanner (Emporia State)

Assistant coach(es)

- Cinco Boone (Eastern New Mexico)
- Ted Crass (Little Rock)
- Cameron Henderson (Montana State)
- Doug Karleskint (MidAmerica Nazarene)
- Jon Trilli (Midwestern State)

Legend

- (C) Team captain
- (S) Suspended
- (I) Ineligible
- (W) Walk-on
- Injured
- Current redshirt

Roster
Last update: December 2, 2024

== Schedule and results ==
Date time, TV	Rank^{#}	Opponent^{#}	Result	Record	Site (attendance) city, state
Exhibition
October 26, 2024*; 2:00 p.m.		Texas A&M–Corpus Christi	L 86–100		Moody Coliseum (315); Abilene, TX
Non-conference regular season
November 4, 2024*; 7:30 p.m., ESPN+		Howard Payne	W 107–74	1–0	Moody Coliseum (1,832); Abilene, TX
November 9, 2024*; 6:00 p.m., ESPN+		Middle Tennessee; C–USA/WAC Alliance	L 56–79	1–1	Moody Coliseum (1,434); Abilene, TX
November 12, 2024*; 7:00 p.m., ESPN+		McMurry	W 101–55	2–1	Moody Coliseum (1,026); Abilene, TX
November 16, 2024*; 2:30 p.m., ESPN+		Texas State	W 72–60	3–1	Moody Coliseum (1,024); Abilene, TX
November 20, 2024*; 6:00 p.m., ESPN+		at Kennesaw State; C-USA/WAC Alliance	L 78–84	3–2	Convocation Center (1,381); Kennesaw, GA
November 25, 2024*; 8:00 p.m.		vs. Southern Miss; Basketball Travelers Invitational	W 82–74	4–2	Worthington Arena (157); Bozeman, MT
November 26, 2024*; 8:00 p.m., ESPN+		at Montana State; Basketball Travelers Invitational	L 59–85	4–3	Worthington Arena (2,393); Bozeman, MT
November 30, 2024*; 7:00 p.m., SLN		at Omaha	W 71–55	5–3	Baxter Arena (2,243); Omaha, NE
December 4, 2024*; 8:00 p.m., ESPN+		at New Mexico State; C-USA/WAC Alliance	W 78–70	6–3	Pan American Center (4,296); Las Cruces, NM
December 9, 2024*; 7:00 p.m., CBSSN		at Baylor	L 57–88	6–4	Foster Pavilion (7,500); Waco, TX
December 14, 2024*; 6:00 p.m., ESPN+		Hardin–Simmons	W 93–62	7–4	Moody Coliseum (1,065); Abilene, TX
December 18, 2024*; 11:00 a.m., ESPN+		at East Texas A&M	L 67–68	7–5	The Field House (1,611); Commerce, TX
December 21, 2024*; 3:00 p.m., ESPN+		Texas Southern	W 69–65	8–5	Moody Coliseum (1,191); Abilene, TX
December 28, 2024*; 3:00 p.m., SECN		at No. 13 Texas A&M	L 54–92	8–6	Reed Arena (11,086); College Station, TX
December 31, 2024*; 3:00 p.m., ESPN+		Stephen F. Austin	L 57–62	8–7	Moody Coliseum (1,064); Abilene, TX
WAC regular season
January 4, 2025; 3:00 p.m., ESPN+		at Utah Valley	L 53–64	8–8 (0–1)	UCCU Center (1,601); Orem, UT
January 11, 2025; 9:00 p.m., ESPN+		at Seattle	L 64–66	8–9 (0–2)	Climate Pledge Arena (1,461); Seattle, WA
January 16, 2025; 8:00 p.m., ESPN+		at Grand Canyon	L 58–88	8–10 (0–3)	GCU Arena (7,129); Phoenix, AZ
January 18, 2025; 6:00 p.m., ESPN+		California Baptist	L 54–60	8–11 (0–4)	Moody Coliseum (1,123); Abilene, TX
January 23, 2025; 7:00 p.m., ESPN+		Tarleton State	W 67–56	9–11 (1–4)	Moody Coliseum (1,854); Abilene, TX
January 25, 2025; 3:00 p.m., ESPN+		UT Arlington	L 76–79 ^{OT}	9–12 (1–5)	Moody Coliseum (1,232); Abilene, TX
January 30, 2025; 9:00 p.m., ESPN+		at California Baptist	L 60–83	9–13 (1–6)	Fowler Events Center (2567); Riverside, CA
February 6, 2025; 8:00 p.m., ESPN+		at Utah Tech	W 86–72	10–13 (2–6)	Burns Arena (1,671); St. George, UT
February 8, 2025; 7:30 p.m., ESPN+		at Southern Utah	W 84–70	11–13 (3–6)	America First Event Center (989); Cedar City, UT
February 13, 2025; 7:00 p.m., ESPN+		Seattle	W 73–59	12–13 (4–6)	Moody Coliseum (1,346); Abilene, TX
February 20, 2025; 7:00 p.m., ESPN+		at Southern Utah	W 75–59	13–13 (5–6)	Moody Coliseum (1,484); Abilene, TX
February 22, 2025; 6:00 p.m., ESPN+		Utah Tech	W 80–72	14–13 (6–6)	Moody Coliseum (1,450); Abilene, TX
February 27, 2025; 7:00 p.m., ESPN+		at Tarleton State	L 52–67	14–14 (6–7)	Wisdom Gym (3,000); Stephenville, TX
March 1, 2025; 2:00 p.m., ESPN+		at UT Arlington	W 70–59	15–14 (7–7)	College Park Center (1,750); Arlington, TX
March 6, 2025; 7:00 p.m., ESPN+		Utah Valley	L 60–73	15–15 (7–8)	Moody Coliseum (1,523); Abilene, TX
March 8, 2025; 3:00 p.m., ESPN+		Grand Canyon	W 82–81 ^{OT}	16–15 (8–8)	Moody Coliseum (1,851); Abilene, TX
WAC tournament
March 13, 2025; 8:00 p.m., ESPN+	(4)	vs. (5) Seattle; Quarterfinals	L 63–69	16–16	Orleans Arena; Paradise, NV
*Non-conference game. ^{#}Rankings from AP poll. (#) Tournament seedings in parentheses. All times are in Central.
