= 2024–25 Utah Tech Trailblazers men's basketball team =

Basketball team season

2024–25 Utah Tech Trailblazers men's basketball
- Conference: Western Athletic Conference
- Record: 7–26 (2–14 WAC)
- Head coach: Jon Judkins (20th season)
- Associate head coach: Jake Schroeder (6th season)
- Assistant coaches: Anthony Morris (4th season); Elliot De Wit (1st season); Brock Staheli (1st season)
- Home arena: Burns Arena

2024–25 WAC men's basketball standings
| | Conf. | | | | Overall |
| Team | W | | L | PCT | W | | L | PCT |
|---|---|---|---|---|---|---|---|---|
| Utah Valley | 15 | – | 1 | .938 | 25 | – | 9 | .735 |
| Grand Canyon † | 13 | – | 3 | .813 | 26 | – | 8 | .765 |
| California Baptist | 9 | – | 7 | .563 | 17 | – | 15 | .531 |
| Abilene Christian | 8 | – | 8 | .500 | 16 | – | 16 | .500 |
| Seattle | 8 | – | 8 | .500 | 14 | – | 18 | .438 |
| Tarleton State | 7 | – | 9 | .438 | 12 | – | 20 | .375 |
| UT Arlington | 6 | – | 10 | .375 | 13 | – | 18 | .419 |
| Southern Utah | 4 | – | 12 | .250 | 12 | – | 19 | .387 |
| Utah Tech | 2 | – | 14 | .125 | 7 | – | 26 | .212 |
† 2025 WAC tournament winner

The 2024–25 Utah Tech Trailblazers men's basketball team represented Utah Tech University during the 2024–25 NCAA Division I men's basketball season. The Trailblazers, led by 20th-year head coach Jon Judkins, played their home games at Burns Arena in St. George, Utah as members of the Western Athletic Conference.

== Previous season ==
The Trailblazers finished the 2023–24 season 11–20, 7–13 in WAC play to finish in 9th place. They did not qualify to participate in the WAC tournament, as only the top eight team were eligible to participate.

== Roster ==
2024–25 Utah Tech Trailblazers men's basketball team
Players
Coaches

| Pos. | # | Name | Height | Weight | Year | Previous school | Hometown |
|---|---|---|---|---|---|---|---|
| G | 0 | Beon Riley | 6 ft 6 in (1.98 m) | 225 lb (102 kg) | Sr | Hawaii | Chula Vista, CA |
| G | 1 | Hunter Schenck | 6 ft 2 in (1.88 m) | 165 lb (75 kg) | Fr | Weber HS | Pleasant View, UT |
| G | 3 | Unisa Turay | 5 ft 10 in (1.78 m) | 165 lb (75 kg) | Sr | Scottsdale CC | Phoenix, AZ |
| G | 4 | Madiba Owona | 6 ft 4 in (1.93 m) | 175 lb (79 kg) | Fr | EB Orthez | Bordeaux, France |
| G | 5 | Dallin Grant | 6 ft 8 in (2.03 m) | 220 lb (100 kg) | RS Fr | Utah State | Cedar City, UT |
| G | 6 | Justin Bieker | 6 ft 5 in (1.96 m) | 185 lb (84 kg) | RS Sr | San Francisco | Portland, OR |
| F | 7 | Bryson Bailey | 6 ft 9 in (2.06 m) | 200 lb (91 kg) | Fr | Skyridge HS | Lehi, UT |
| G | 8 | Hakim Byrd | 5 ft 10 in (1.78 m) | 155 lb (70 kg) | RS Sr | Marist | Philadelphia, PA |
| G/F | 10 | Tennessee Rainwater | 6 ft 6 in (1.98 m) | 210 lb (95 kg) | Fr | Davenport HS | Davenport, WA |
| G | 11 | Noa Gonsalves | 6 ft 1 in (1.85 m) | 175 lb (79 kg) | Sr | Lehi HS | Lehi, UT |
| G | 13 | Britton Berrett | 6 ft 5 in (1.96 m) | 185 lb (84 kg) | Jr | Southern Idaho | Rigby, ID |
| G/F | 14 | Preston Vandermyde | 6 ft 5 in (1.96 m) | 190 lb (86 kg) | Fr | Desert Hills HS | St. George, UT |
| F | 19 | Samuel Ariyibi | 6 ft 8 in (2.03 m) | 190 lb (86 kg) | RS Jr | Washington | Lagos, Nigeria |
| G/F | 23 | Stone Hutchings | 6 ft 5 in (1.96 m) | 195 lb (88 kg) | RS So | Copper Hills HS | West Jordan, UT |
| C | 33 | Sammy Howlin | 6 ft 11 in (2.11 m) | 210 lb (95 kg) | Sr | Fullerton College | La Habra, CA |
| C | 54 | Pavle Misic | 6 ft 10 in (2.08 m) | 215 lb (98 kg) | Fr | Dunav SB | Niš, Serbia |

Head coach

- Jon Judkins (Utah State)

Assistant coach(es)

- Jake Schroeder (Portland State)
- Anthony Morris (Washington)
- Elliott De Wit (Texas Tech)
- Brock Staheli (Utah Tech)

Legend

- (C) Team captain
- (S) Suspended
- (I) Ineligible
- (W) Walk-on
- Injured
- Current redshirt

Roster
Last update: December 1, 2024

== Schedule and results ==
| Date time, TV | Rank^{#} | Opponent^{#} | Result | Record | Site (attendance) city, state |
Non-conference regular season
| November 4, 2024*; 7:00 pm, ESPN+ | | at Oregon State | L 57–80 | 0–1 | Gill Coliseum (2,501); Corvallis, OR |
| November 9, 2024*; 7:00 pm, ESPN+ | | New Mexico State; WAC/C-USA Alliance | L 63–75 | 0–2 | Burns Arena (1,392); St. George, UT |
| November 13, 2024*; 7:00 pm, ESPN+ | | Bethesda (CA) | W 90–59 | 1–2 | Burns Arena (1,126); St. George, UT |
| November 16, 2024*; 7:00 pm, MW Network | | at Wyoming | L 69–86 | 1–3 | Arena-Auditorium (3,596); Laramie, WY |
| November 22, 2024*; 3:30 pm, ESPN+ | | at Utah | L 53–84 | 1–4 | Jon M. Huntsman Center (6,969); Salt Lake City, UT |
| November 24, 2024*; 2:00 pm, ESPN+ | | vs. Cal State Northridge; Stew Morrill Classic | L 79–89 | 1–5 | Dahlberg Arena (138); Missoula, MT |
| November 25, 2024*; 7:00 pm, ESPN+ | | at Montana; Stew Morrill Classic | L 66–69 | 1–6 | Dahlberg Arena (2,267); Missoula, MT |
| November 26, 2024*; 2:00 pm, ESPN+ | | vs. Denver; Stew Morrill Classic | W 68–54 | 2–6 | Dahlberg Arena (102); Missoula, MT |
| November 30, 2024*; 5:00 pm, ESPN+ | | at Portland State | L 68–71 | 2–7 | Viking Pavilion (570); Portland, OR |
| December 3, 2024*; 7:00 pm, MW Network | | at Boise State | L 64–87 | 2–8 | ExtraMile Arena (10,282); Boise, ID |
| December 7, 2024*; 7:00 pm, MW Network | | at Utah State | L 62–92 | 2–9 | Smith Spectrum (8,270); Logan, UT |
| December 13, 2024*; 7:00 pm, ESPN+ | | Weber State | L 71–73 | 2–10 | Burns Arena (1,559); St. George, UT |
| December 16, 2024*; 7:00 pm, ESPN+ | | Whittier | W 100–66 | 3–10 | Burns Arena (1,046); St. George, UT |
| December 19, 2024*; 7:00 pm, ESPN+ | | South Dakota | W 92–87 | 4–10 | Burns Arena (1,016); St. George, UT |
| December 30, 2024*; 10:00 am, ESPN+ | | at FIU; WAC/C-USA Alliance | L 66–80 | 4–11 | Ocean Bank Convocation Center (613); Miami, FL |
WAC regular season
| January 9, 2025; 7:00 pm, ESPN+ | | UT Arlington | W 74–62 | 5–11 (1–0) | Burns Arena (1,652); St. George, UT |
| January 11, 2025; 7:00 pm, ESPN+ | | Tarleton State | W 58–54 | 6–11 (2–0) | Burns Arena (1,736); St. George, UT |
| January 16, 2025; 8:00 pm, ESPN+ | | at Seattle | L 62–82 | 6–12 (2–1) | Redhawk Center (949); Seattle, WA |
| January 18, 2025; 2:00 pm, ESPN+ | | at Utah Valley; Old Hammer Rivalry | L 80–96 | 6–13 (2–2) | UCCU Center (2,334); Orem, UT |
| January 25, 2025; 7:00 pm, ESPN+ | | Grand Canyon | L 66–79 | 6–14 (2–3) | Burns Arena (2,993); St. George, UT |
| January 30, 2025; 6:00 pm, ESPN+ | | at Tarleton State | L 54–61 | 6–15 (2–4) | Wisdom Gym (1,801); Stephenville, TX |
| February 1, 2025; 1:00 pm, ESPN+ | | at UT Arlington | L 71–73 | 6–16 (2–5) | College Park Center (1,430); Arlington, TX |
| February 6, 2025; 7:00 pm, ESPN+ | | Abilene Christian | L 72–86 | 6–17 (2–6) | Burns Arena (1,671); St. George, UT |
| February 13, 2025; 6:30 pm, ESPN+ | | at Southern Utah | L 74–76 | 6–18 (2–7) | America First Event Center (2,414); Cedar City, UT |
| February 15, 2025; 7:00 pm, ESPN+ | | at California Baptist | L 83–86 | 6–19 (2–8) | Fowler Events Center (3,952); Riverside, CA |
| February 20, 2025; 7:00 pm, ESPN+ | | Utah Valley; Old Hammer Rivalry | L 77–79 ^{OT} | 6–20 (2–9) | Burns Arena (1,984); St. George, UT |
| February 22, 2025; 5:00 pm, ESPN+ | | at Abilene Christian | L 72–80 | 6–21 (2–10) | Moody Coliseum (1,450); Abilene, TX |
| February 27, 2025; 7:00 pm, ESPN+ | | Southern Utah | L 75–82 | 6–22 (2–11) | Burns Arena (3,185); St. George, UT |
| March 1, 2025; 7:00 pm, ESPN+ | | California Baptist | L 57–61 | 6–23 (2–12) | Burns Arena (1,663); St. George, UT |
| March 6, 2025; 7:00 pm, ESPN+ | | at Grand Canyon | L 68–90 | 6–24 (2–13) | GCU Arena; Phoenix, AZ |
| March 8, 2025; 7:00 pm, ESPN+ | | Seattle | L 65–70 | 6–25 (2–14) | Burns Arena (1,556); St. George, UT |
WAC tournament
| March 11, 2025; 2:30 pm, ESPN+ | (9) | (8) Southern Utah; First round | W 72–65 | 7–25 | Burns Arena (1,022); St. George, UT |
| March 12, 2025; 7:00 pm, ESPN+ | (9) | vs. (1) Utah Valley; Quarterfinals/Old Hammer Rivalry | L 57–74 | 7–26 | Orleans Arena; Paradise, NV |
*Non-conference game. ^{#}Rankings from AP poll. (#) Tournament seedings in parentheses. All times are in Mountain Time.
