= 2024–25 Western Athletic Conference men's basketball season =

2024–25 WAC men's basketball season
- League: NCAA Division I
- Sport: Basketball
- Teams: 9
- TV partner(s): ESPN, ESPN+

Regular season

WAC tournament

WAC men's basketball seasons
- ← 2023–24 2025–26 →

2024–25 WAC men's basketball standings
	Conf.				Overall
Team	W		L	PCT	W		L	PCT
Utah Valley	15	–	1	.938	25	–	9	.735
Grand Canyon †	13	–	3	.813	26	–	8	.765
California Baptist	9	–	7	.563	17	–	15	.531
Abilene Christian	8	–	8	.500	16	–	16	.500
Seattle	8	–	8	.500	14	–	18	.438
Tarleton State	7	–	9	.438	12	–	20	.375
UT Arlington	6	–	10	.375	13	–	18	.419
Southern Utah	4	–	12	.250	12	–	19	.387
Utah Tech	2	–	14	.125	7	–	26	.212
† 2025 WAC tournament winner

The 2024–25 WAC men's basketball season began with practices in October followed by the start of the 2024–25 NCAA Division I men's basketball season in early November 2024. The conference began play in January 2025. This is the WAC's 63rd season of basketball. The WAC competed with nine teams due to two teams having left the conference since the prior season. UTRGV and Stephen F. Austin both joined the Southland Conference since the prior year. The WAC tournament will be held in March 2025 with all nine teams competing for the automatic bid to the 2025 NCAA Division I men's basketball tournament. The opening round will be held at Burns Arena in St. George, Utah with the remaining rounds at the Orleans Arena in the Las Vegas-area community of Paradise, Nevada.

This was intended to be last WAC season for both Grand Canyon and Seattle, which announced that they would join the West Coast Conference (WCC) the following year. While Seattle will go through with its conference change, Grand Canyon reneged on its WCC move in favor of joining the Mountain West Conference no later than 2026.

== Pre-season ==
=== WAC Media days ===
The WAC's 2024 men's basketball media day was held on October 15.

Men's Basketball Coaches Preseason Poll
Place	Team	Points	First place votes
1.	Grand Canyon	64	8
2.	UT Arlington	49	--
3	Seattle U	46	1
4.	California Baptist	45	--
5.	Utah Valley	38	--
6.	Tarleton	30	--
7.	Abilene Christian	29	--
8.	Utah Tech	12	--
9.	Southern Utah	11	--

=== WAC Preseason All-Conference ===
First Team

Name	School	Yr.	Pos.
Tyon Grant-Foster†	Grand Canyon	Senior	G
Dominique Daniels Jr.	California Baptist	Senior	G
Ray Harrison	Grand Canyon	Senior	G
John Christofilis	Seattle U	Junior	G
Freddy Hicks	Tarleton State	Senior	G/F

† Denotes Preseason Player of the Year

== Regular season ==
=== Early season tournaments ===
Team	Tournament	Finish
Abilene Christian	Montana State MTE	2nd
California Baptist	Acrisure Holiday Invitational	3rd
Grand Canyon	Acrisure Holiday Invitational	1st
Seattle U	Vegas Showdown	4th
Southern Utah	San Diego MTE	1st
Tarleton	Baha Mar Hoops Nassau Championship	4th
UT Arlington	Jacksonville Classic	4th
Utah Tech	Montana MTE	3rd
Utah Valley	Samford MTE	3rd

=== Conference USA-Western Athletic Conference Challenge ===
Date	Conference USA team	WAC team	Score	Location	Leader
November 9	New Mexico State	Utah Tech	75–63	Burns Arena • St. George, UT	CUSA (1–0)
November 9	UTEP	Utah Valley	89–60	UCCU Center • Orem, UT	Tied (1–1)
November 9	Sam Houston	Tarleton	91–62	Wisdom Gym • Stephenville, TX	CUSA (2–1)
November 9	Western Kentucky	Grand Canyon	74–72	Global Credit Union Arena • Phoenix, AZ	Tied (2–2)
November 9	Louisiana Tech	UT Arlington	92–77	College Park Center • Arlington, TX	CUSA (3–2)
November 9	Liberty	Seattle	66–64	Redhawk Center • Seattle, WA	CUSA (4–2)
November 9	Middle Tennessee	Abilene Christian	79–56	Moody Coliseum • Abilene, TX	CUSA (5–2)
November 9	Kennesaw State	California Baptist	88–84	Fowler Events Center • Riverside, CA	CUSA (5–3)
November 9	Florida International	Southern Utah	80–75	America First Event Center • Cedar City, UT	CUSA (5–4)
November 20	Kennesaw State	Abilene Christian	84–78	Convocation Center • Kennesaw, GA	CUSA (6–4)
December 14	Jacksonville State	Utah Valley	70–66	Pete Mathews Coliseum • Jacksonville, FL	CUSA (7–4)
December 16	UTEP	Tarleton	67–62	Don Haskins Center • El Paso, TX	CUSA (8–4)
December 16	Louisiana Tech	Grand Canyon	74–66	Thomas Assembly Center • Ruston, LA	(CUSA 9–4)
December 16	Middle Tennessee	California Baptist	75–64	Murphy Center • Murfreesboro, TN	CUSA (10–4)
December 16	New Mexico State	Southern Utah	72–66	Pan American Center • Las Cruces, NM	CUSA (11–4)
December 17	Western Kentucky	Seattle	86–73	E. A. Diddle Arena • Bowling Green, KY	CUSA (12–4)
December 21	Liberty	UT Arlington	79–56	Liberty Arena • Lynchburg, VA	CUSA (13–4)
December 30	Florida International	Utah Tech	80–66	Ocean Bank Convocation Center • Miami, FL	CUSA (14–4)
WINNERS ARE IN BOLD. HOME TEAM IN ITALICS. Rankings from AP Poll released prior to the game. Did not participate: none

=== Records against other conferences ===
2024–25 records against non-conference foes:

Regular season

Power Conferences & Gonzaga	Record
ACC	1–5
Big East	0–0
Big Ten	1–3
Big 12	0–8
Pac-12	0–0
SEC	0–2
Gonzaga	0–0
Power Conference Total	2–18
Other NCAA Division I Conferences	Record
America East	1–0
American	0–0
A-10	1–2
ASUN	2–0
Big Sky	5–7
Big South	0–0
Big West	4–5
CAA	1–0
C-USA	5–15
Horizon	0–0
Ivy League	0–0
MAAC	0–1
MAC	0–0
MEAC	1–0
MVC	2–4
Mountain West	2–4
NEC	2–0
OVC	0–0
Patriot League	0–0
SoCon	0–2
Southland	1–4
SWAC	3–0
Summit	5–2
Sun Belt	5–2
WCC (except Gonzaga)	2–1
Other Division I Total	42–49
Non-Division I Total	18–0
NCAA Division I Total	44–67

=== Record against ranked non-conference opponents ===
This is a list of games against ranked opponents only (rankings from the AP poll/Coaches poll):

Date	Visitor	Home	Score
November 17	Tarleton	#14/12 Baylor	L, 41–104
November 29	Seattle	#10/11 Duke	L, 48–70
December 9	Abilene Christian	#RV/25 Baylor	L, 57–88
December 11	California Baptist	#23/24 San Diego State	L, 75–81
December 28	Abilene Christian	#13 Texas A&M	L, 54–92

Team rankings are reflective of AP poll/Coaches poll when the game was played, not current or final ranking.

=== Rankings ===
	Improvement in ranking
	Drop in ranking
RV	Received votes but were not ranked in Top 25
NV	No votes received

		Pre	Wk 2	Wk 3	Wk 4	Wk 5	Wk 6	Wk 7	Wk 8	Wk 9	Wk 10	Wk 11	Wk 12	Wk 13	Wk 14	Wk 15	Wk 16	Wk 17	Wk 18	Wk 19	Wk 20	Final
Abilene Christian	AP	NV	NV	NV	NV	NV	NV	NV	NV	NV	NV	NV	NV	NV	NV	NV	NV	NV	NV	NV	NV	NV
Abilene Christian	C	NV	NV	NV	NV	NV	NV	NV	NV	NV	NV	NV	NV	NV	NV	NV	NV	NV	NV	NV	NV	NV
California Baptist	AP	NV	NV	NV	NV	NV	NV	NV	NV	NV	NV	NV	NV	NV	NV	NV	NV	NV	NV	NV	NV	NV
California Baptist	C	NV	NV	NV	NV	NV	NV	NV	NV	NV	NV	NV	NV	NV	NV	NV	NV	NV	NV	NV	NV	NV
Grand Canyon	AP	RV	RV	NV	NV	NV	NV	NV	NV	NV	NV	NV	NV	NV	NV	NV	NV	NV	NV	NV	NV	NV
Grand Canyon	C	RV	RV	NV	NV	NV	NV	NV	NV	NV	NV	NV	NV	NV	NV	NV	NV	NV	NV	NV	NV	NV
Seattle U	AP	NV	NV	NV	NV	NV	NV	NV	NV	NV	NV	NV	NV	NV	NV	NV	NV	NV	NV	NV	NV	NV
Seattle U	C	NV	NV	NV	NV	NV	NV	NV	NV	NV	NV	NV	NV	NV	NV	NV	NV	NV	NV	NV	NV	NV
Southern Utah	AP	NV	NV	NV	NV	NV	NV	NV	NV	NV	NV	NV	NV	NV	NV	NV	NV	NV	NV	NV	NV	NV
Southern Utah	C	NV	NV	NV	NV	NV	NV	NV	NV	NV	NV	NV	NV	NV	NV	NV	NV	NV	NV	NV	NV	NV
Tarleton	AP	NV	NV	NV	NV	NV	NV	NV	NV	NV	NV	NV	NV	NV	NV	NV	NV	NV	NV	NV	NV	NV
Tarleton	C	NV	NV	NV	NV	NV	NV	NV	NV	NV	NV	NV	NV	NV	NV	NV	NV	NV	NV	NV	NV	NV
UT Arlington	AP	NV	NV	NV	NV	NV	NV	NV	NV	NV	NV	NV	NV	NV	NV	NV	NV	NV	NV	NV	NV	NV
UT Arlington	C	NV	NV	NV	NV	NV	NV	NV	NV	NV	NV	NV	NV	NV	NV	NV	NV	NV	NV	NV	NV	NV
Utah Tech	AP	NV	NV	NV	NV	NV	NV	NV	NV	NV	NV	NV	NV	NV	NV	NV	NV	NV	NV	NV	NV	NV
Utah Tech	C	NV	NV	NV	NV	NV	NV	NV	NV	NV	NV	NV	NV	NV	NV	NV	NV	NV	NV	NV	NV	NV
Utah Valley	AP	NV	NV	NV	NV	NV	NV	NV	NV	NV	NV	NV	NV	NV	NV	NV	NV	NV	NV	NV	NV	NV
Utah Valley	C	NV	NV	NV	NV	NV	NV	NV	NV	NV	NV	NV	NV	NV	NV	NV	NV	NV	NV	NV	NV	NV

== Head coaches ==
=== Coaching changes ===
No coaching changes were made during the offseason.

=== Coaches ===
Note: Stats shown are before the beginning of the season. Overall and WAC records are from time at current school.

Team	Head coach	Previous job	Seasons at school	Overall record	WAC record	WAC titles	NCAA tournaments	NCAA Final Fours	NCAA Championships
Abilene Christian	Brette Tanner	(Associate HC)	4th	54–46 (.540)	28–28(.500)	0	0	0	0
California Baptist	Rick Croy	St. Mary's (assistant)	12th	101-84 (.546)	47-55 (.461)	0	0	0	0
Grand Canyon	Bryce Drew	Vanderbilt	5th	94-32 (.746)	50-18 (.735)	2	3	0	0
Seattle U	Chris Victor	(Assistant/interim HC)	4th	66-35 (.653)	36-20 (.643)	1	0	0	0
Southern Utah	Rob Jeter	Western Illinois	2nd	10-21 (.323)	5-15 (.250)	0	0	0	0
Tarleton	Billy Gillispie	Ranger College	5th	59-51 (.536)	34-28 (.548)	0	0	0	0
UT Arlington	K. T. Turner	Kentucky (assistant)	2nd	20-14 (.588)	13-7 (.650)	0	0	0	0
Utah Tech	Jon Judkins	Snow College	20th	319-168 (.655)	22-48 (.314)	0	0	0	0
Utah Valley	Todd Phillips	(Associate HC)	2nd	16-16 (.500)	11-9 (.550)	0	0	0	0

Notes:

- Overall and WAC records, conference titles, etc. are from time at current school and are through the end of the 2023–24 season.
- Records and season totals only include time spent at Division I as head coach.
- NCAA tournament appearances are from time at current school only.
- NCAA Final Fours and Championship include time at other schools.

== Postseason ==
=== WAC tournament ===
The WAC tournament was held in March 2025 with all nine teams competing for the automatic bid to the 2025 NCAA Division I men's basketball tournament. The opening round was held at Burns Arena in St. George, Utah with the remaining rounds at the Orleans Arena in the Las Vegas-area community of Paradise, Nevada.

=== NCAA tournament ===
Teams from the conference that were selected to participate: 1

Seed	Region	School	First Four	First round	Second round	Sweet Sixteen	Elite Eight	Final Four	Championship
13	West	Grand Canyon	N/A	lost to Maryland 81–49		–	–	–	–
	Bids	W-L (%):	0–0 (–)	0–1 (.000)	0–0 (–)	0–0 (–)	0–0 (–)	0–0 (–)	TOTAL: 0–1 (.000)

=== National Invitation Tournament ===
Number from the conference that were selected to participate: 1

Seed	School	First round	Second round	Quarterfinals	Semifinals	Finals
N/A	Utah Valley	lost to San Francisco 70–79	–	–	–	–
	W-L (%):	0–1 (.000)	0–0 (–)	0–0 (–)	0–0 (–)	TOTAL: 0–1 (.000)

=== College Basketball Invitational ===
Number from the conference that were selected to participate: 0

Seed	School	First round	Quarterfinals	Semifinals	Finals
–	–	–	–	–	–
	W-L (%):	0–0 (–)	0–0 (–)	0–0 (–)	TOTAL: 0–0 (–)

=== College Basketball Crown Postseason Tournament ===
Number from the conference that were selected to participate: 0

Seed	School	First round	Quarterfinals	Semifinals	Finals
N/A	–	–	–	–	–
	W-L (%):	0–0 (–)	0–0 (–)	0–0 (–)	TOTAL: 0–0 (–)

Index to colors and formatting
WAC member won
WAC member lost

*Denotes overtime period

== Awards and honors ==
=== Players of the week ===
Throughout the conference regular season, the WAC offices name a player of the week and a newcomer of the week each Monday.

Week	Player of the Week	School	Newcomer of the Week	School
November 11	JaKobe Coles	Grand Canyon	JaKobe Coles	Grand Canyon
November 18	Jaden Wells	UT Arlington	Jaden Wells	UT Arlington
November 25	Jamir Simpson	Southern Utah	Jamir Simpson	Southern Utah
December 2	Dominique Daniels Jr.	Cal Baptist	Carter Welling	Utah Valley
December 9	Hunter Jack Madden	Abilene Christian	Matthew-Alexander Moncrieffe	Seattle U
December 16	Dominique Daniels Jr. (2)	Cal Baptist	Lance Ware	UT Arlington
December 23	Carter Welling	Utah Valley	Carter Welling (2)	Utah Valley
December 31	Lance Ware	UT Arlington	Lance Ware (2)	UT Arlington
January 6	Tyon Grant-Foster	Grand Canyon	AJ Braun	California Baptist
January 13	Matthew-Alexander Moncrieffe	Seattle U	Matthew-Alexander Moncrieffe (2)	Seattle U
January 20	Tanner Toolson	Utah Valley	Dominick Nelson	Utah Valley
January 27	Dominick Nelson	Utah Valley	Dominick Nelson (2)	Utah Valley
February 3	Tyon Grant-Foster (2)	Grand Canyon	Lance Ware (3)	UT Arlington
February 10	Brayden Maldonado	Seattle U	Brayden Maldonado	Seattle U
February 17	Dominique Daniels Jr. (3)	Cal Baptist	Carter Welling (3)	Utah Valley
February 24	Kendal Coleman	Cal Baptist	JaKobe Coles (2)	Grand Canyon
March 3	Dominick Nelson (2)	Utah Valley	Dominick Nelson (3)	Utah Valley
March 9	Dominick Nelson (3)	Utah Valley	Dominick Nelson (4)	Utah Valley

==== Totals per school - Players of the week ====
School	Player of the week	Newcomer of the week	Total
Abilene Christian University	1		1
California Baptist University	4	1	5
Grand Canyon University	3	2	5
Seattle University	2	3	5
Southern Utah University	1	1	2
Tarleton State University			
University of Texas at Arlington	2	4	6
Utah Tech University			
Utah Valley University	5	7	10
Total	18	18	36

=== All-WAC ===
First team

Name	School
Dominick Nelson‡	Utah Valley
Jakobe Coles	Grand Canyon
Tyon Grant-Foster	Grand Canyon
Matthew-Alexander Moncrieffe	Seattle
Dominique Daniels, Jr.	California Baptist

- ‡ WAC Player of the Year

Second team

Name	School
Duke Brennan	Grand Canyon
Jamir Simpson	Southern Utah
Lance Ware	UT Arlington
Tanner Toolson	Utah Valley
Carter Welling	Utah Valley

==== All-Freshman team ====
Name	School
Dontrez Williams	Abilene Christian
Bradey Henige	California Baptist
Keitenn Bristow†	Tarleton
Madiba Owona	Utah Tech
Jackson Holcombe	Utah Valley

† Freshman of the Year

==== All-Defensive team ====
Name	School
Collin Moore	Grand Canyon
Duke Brennan	Grand Canyon
Carter Welling‡	Utah Valley
Maleek Arington	Seattle
Lance Ware	UT Arlington

- ‡WAC Defensive Player of the Year

==== Other awards ====
Sixth Man of the Year: Lok Wur, Grand Canyon

Coach of the Year: Todd Phillips, Utah Valley

== Home game attendance ==
Team	Stadium	Capacity	Game 1	Game 2	Game 3	Game 4	Game 5	Game 6	Game 7	Game 8	Game 9	Game 10	Game 11	Game 12	Game 13	Game 14	Game 15	Game 16	Game 17	Total	Average	% of Capacity
Abilene Christian	Moody Coliseum	3,600	1,832	1,434	1,026	1,024	1,065	1,191	1,064	1,123	1,854†	1,232	1,346	1,484	1,450	1,523	1,851			20,499	1,367	38%
California Baptist	CBU Events Center	5,050	3,294	2,557	3,607	4,233†	2,737	2,064	2,603	2,720	2,611	3,867	2,567	2,865	4,174	3,952	3,161	3,062		50,074	3,130	62%
Grand Canyon	GCU Arena	7,000	**7,053**	**7,332**	**7,002**	**7,022**	**7,004**	**7,038**	**7,024**	**7,112**	**7,214**	**7,398†**	**7,129**	**7,105**	**7,191**	**7,219**	**7,286**	**7,186**	N/A	114,315	**7,145**	102%
Seattle U	Redhawk Center/Climate Pledge Arena	999/18,100	**999**	966	1,194‡	688	852	840	1,461†‡	949	772	**999**	707	**999**	864	**999**				13,289	949	95%
Southern Utah	America First Event Center	5,300	1,486	2,856†	965	1,006	995	900	741	1,453	1,061	N/A	1,253	989	2,414	1,555	1,074			18,748	1,339	25%
Tarleton State	Wisdom Gymnasium	3,000	1,487	1,176	1,379	856	715	898	1,376	1,801	1,312	1,786	2,123	**3,000†**	**3,000†**					20,909	1,608	54%
UT Arlington	College Park Center	7,000	1,001	3,195	1,169	1,369	1,256	1,824	1,529	1,450	1,430	1,754	1,574	5,183†	1,750					24,484	1,883	27%
Utah Tech	Burns Arena	4,779	1,392	1,126	1,559	1,046	1,016	1,652	1,736	2,993	1,671	1,984	3,185†	1,663	1,556					22,579	1,737	36%
Utah Valley	UCCU Center	8,500	2,075	1,653	2,135	1,463	1,601	2,351	1,863	2,334	2,681	1,676	2,813	3,449†						26,094	2,175	26%
Total		62.329																		310,991	21,332	52%

Bold – At or exceed capacity; capacity ratios for Seattle U computed based on smaller home arena; attendance is for regular season only

- †Season high
- ‡Climate Pledge Arena

== See also ==
- 2024–25 Western Athletic Conference women's basketball season
- Western Athletic Conference Men's Basketball Player of the Year
