= 2024–25 Grand Canyon Antelopes men's basketball team =

American college basketball season

2024–25 Grand Canyon Antelopes men's basketball

WAC tournament champions

NCAA tournament, first round
- Conference: Western Athletic Conference
- Record: 26–8 (13–3 WAC)
- Head coach: Bryce Drew (5th season)
- Assistant coaches: Jermaine Kimbrough; Casey Shaw; Marc Rodgers; Jake Lindsey; Peyton Prudhomme
- Home arena: GCU Arena

2024–25 WAC men's basketball standings
| | Conf. | | | | Overall |
| Team | W | | L | PCT | W | | L | PCT |
|---|---|---|---|---|---|---|---|---|
| Utah Valley | 15 | – | 1 | .938 | 25 | – | 9 | .735 |
| Grand Canyon † | 13 | – | 3 | .813 | 26 | – | 8 | .765 |
| California Baptist | 9 | – | 7 | .563 | 17 | – | 15 | .531 |
| Abilene Christian | 8 | – | 8 | .500 | 16 | – | 16 | .500 |
| Seattle | 8 | – | 8 | .500 | 14 | – | 18 | .438 |
| Tarleton State | 7 | – | 9 | .438 | 12 | – | 20 | .375 |
| UT Arlington | 6 | – | 10 | .375 | 13 | – | 18 | .419 |
| Southern Utah | 4 | – | 12 | .250 | 12 | – | 19 | .387 |
| Utah Tech | 2 | – | 14 | .125 | 7 | – | 26 | .212 |
† 2025 WAC tournament winner

The 2024–25 Grand Canyon Antelopes men's basketball team represented Grand Canyon University in the 2024–25 NCAA Division I men's basketball season. They were led by fifth-year head coach Bryce Drew and played their games at GCU Arena as members of the Western Athletic Conference (WAC).

The Antelopes finished the season with a 26–8 record, 13–3 in WAC play, to finish in second place. They lost in the first round of the NCAA tournament to fourth seed Maryland.

== Previous season ==
The Antelopes finished the 2023–24 season 30–5, 17–3 in conference play, to finish in first place. They were both the WAC regular-season and conference tournament champions. As the automatic qualifier for the WAC, they earned the No. 12 seed in the NCAA tournament. They upset the No. 5 seed Saint Mary's in the first round before losing to Alabama in the second round.

== Roster ==
2024–25 Grand Canyon Antelopes men's basketball team
Players
Coaches

| Pos. | # | Name | Height | Weight | Year | Hometown |
|---|---|---|---|---|---|---|
| G | 0 | Ray Harrison | 6 ft 4 in (1.93 m) | 190 lb (86 kg) | Sr | Greenville, SC |
| G | 1 | Styles Phipps | 6 ft 2 in (1.88 m) | 190 lb (86 kg) | Fr | Avondale, AZ |
| G | 2 | Makaih Williams | 6 ft 2 in (1.88 m) | 185 lb (84 kg) | So | Long Beach, CA |
| G/F | 3 | Braylon Johnson | 6 ft 7 in (2.01 m) | 210 lb (95 kg) | Fr | Moon Township, PA |
| F | 5 | Lök Wur | 6 ft 9 in (2.06 m) | 215 lb (98 kg) | GS | North Omaha, NE |
| G | 6 | Malcolm Flaggs | 6 ft 6 in (1.98 m) | 200 lb (91 kg) | RS So | Tuba City, AZ |
| G | 7 | Tyon Grant-Foster | 6 ft 7 in (2.01 m) | 220 lb (100 kg) | GS | Kansas City, KS |
| G | 8 | Collin Moore | 6 ft 4 in (1.93 m) | 210 lb (95 kg) | Sr | North Little Rock, AR |
| F | 9 | Traivar Jackson | 6 ft 6 in (1.98 m) | 210 lb (95 kg) | Sr | Anchorage, AK |
| G | 11 | Caleb Shaw | 6 ft 6 in (1.98 m) | 215 lb (98 kg) | RS So | Phoenix, AZ |
| G | 12 | Jason Amador | 6 ft 0 in (1.83 m) | 195 lb (88 kg) | GS | Parker, AZ |
| C | 14 | Dennis Evans | 7 ft 1 in (2.16 m) | 215 lb (98 kg) | RS Fr | Riverside, CA |
| F | 21 | JaKobe Coles | 6 ft 8 in (2.03 m) | 230 lb (104 kg) | Sr | Denton, TX |
| F | 23 | Sammie Yeanay | 6 ft 8 in (2.03 m) | 240 lb (109 kg) | Fr | Gainesville, FL |
| F | 24 | Duke Brennan | 6 ft 10 in (2.08 m) | 250 lb (113 kg) | Jr | Chandler, AZ |
| C | 34 | Austin Maurer | 7 ft 0 in (2.13 m) | 225 lb (102 kg) | Fr | Medford, OR |

Head coach

- Bryce Drew (Valparaiso)

Assistant coach(es)

- Jermaine Kimbrough (Virginia Tech)
- Casey Shaw (Toledo)
- Marc Rodgers (Central Washington)
- Jake Lindsey (Baylor)
- Peyton Prudhomme (Texas Wesleyan)

Legend

- (C) Team captain
- (S) Suspended
- (I) Ineligible
- (W) Walk-on
- Injured
- Current redshirt

Roster
Last update: October 28, 2024

== Schedule and results ==
| Date time, TV | Rank^{#} | Opponent^{#} | Result | Record | High points | High rebounds | High assists | Site (attendance) city, state |
Exhibition
| October 29, 2024*; 7:00 p.m., Fox 10 Xtra/ESPN+ | | Eastern New Mexico | W 87–57 | – | 19 – Coles | 9 – Coles | 4 – Harrison | GCU Arena (7,244); Phoenix, AZ |
Non-conference regular season
| November 4, 2024*; 7:00 p.m., Fox 10 Xtra/ESPN+ | | Cal State Fullerton; Beach Night | W 89–79 | 1–0 | 26 – Coles | 13 – Coles | 4 – Harrison | GCU Arena (7,053); Phoenix, AZ |
| November 9, 2024*; 6:00 p.m., Fox 10 Xtra/ESPN+ | | Western Kentucky; WAC–CUSA Initiative/Purple Out | W 74–72 | 2–0 | 23 – Moore | 11 – Coles | 3 – 2 tied | GCU Arena (7,332); Phoenix, AZ |
| November 14, 2024*; 7:00 p.m., ESPN2 | | vs. Arizona State; Hall of Fame Series | L 76–87 | 2–1 | 19 – Grant-Foster | 7 – Grant-Foster | 6 – Harrison | Footprint Center (13,705); Phoenix, AZ |
| November 20, 2024*; 7:00 p.m., Fox 10 Xtra/ESPN+ | | UC Davis; Acrisure Series Showcase on-campus game Country Night | L 68–75 | 2–2 | 18 – 2 tied | 9 – 2 tied | 3 – 2 tied | GCU Arena (7,002); Phoenix, AZ |
| November 22, 2024*; 7:00 p.m., Fox 10 Xtra/ESPN+ | | Norfolk State; Acrisure Series Showcase on-campus game Arizona Educator Appreciation Night | W 91–73 | 3–2 | 20 – 2 tied | 7 – Brennan | 8 – Harrison | GCU Arena (7,022); Phoenix, AZ |
| November 26, 2024*; 5:00 p.m., truTV | | vs. Stanford; Acrisure Series Showcase | W 78–71 | 4–2 | 15 – Moore | 8 – 2 tied | 5 – Grant-Foster | Acrisure Arena (753); Palm Desert, CA |
| December 3, 2024*; 7:00 p.m., Fox 10 Xtra/ESPN+ | | Hawaii; Litmas Christmas Game | W 78–72 | 5–2 | 23 – Grant-Foster | 7 – Harrison | 2 – 4 tied | GCU Arena (7,004); Phoenix, AZ |
| December 7, 2024*; 6:00 p.m., Fox 10 Xtra/ESPN+ | | Life Pacific; Lopes Ski Lodge | W 100–52 | 6–2 | 22 – Shaw | 15 – Brennan | 6 – Phipps | GCU Arena (7,038); Phoenix, AZ |
| December 14, 2024*; 4:00 p.m., SECN | | vs. Georgia; Holiday Hoopsgiving | L 68–73 | 6–3 | 16 – Harrison | 9 – Wur | 4 – Harrison | State Farm Arena; Atlanta, GA |
| December 16, 2024*; 5:30 p.m., ESPN+ | | at Louisiana Tech; WAC–CUSA Initiative | L 66–74 | 6–4 | 19 – Coles | 7 – Brennan | 4 – Harrison | Thomas Assembly Center (2,173); Ruston, LA |
| December 19, 2024*; 7:00 p.m., Fox 10 Xtra/ESPN+ | | Chicago State; Hometown Heroes | W 74–51 | 7–4 | 20 – Wur | 4 – Williams | 4 – Moore | GCU Arena (7,024); Phoenix, AZ |
| December 22, 2024*; 2:00 p.m., Fox 10 Xtra/ESPN+ | | Saint Louis; Canyon Christmas Fest | W 73–72 | 8–4 | 20 – Moore | 9 – Brennan | 4 – Coles | GCU Arena (7,112); Phoenix, AZ |
| December 28, 2024*; 4:30 p.m. | | vs. San Diego; West Coast Hoops Showcase | W 68–55 | 9–4 | 18 – Coles | 10 – Coles | 2 – 2 tied | Intuit Dome (12,272); Inglewood, CA |
| December 30, 2024*; 6:00 p.m., Fox 10 Xtra/ESPN+ | | Bryant; Employee Holiday Party | W 112–66 | 10–4 | 31 – Williams | 15 – Brennan | 3 – 3 tied | GCU Arena (7,214); Phoenix, AZ |
WAC regular season
| January 4, 2025; 6:00 p.m., Fox 10 Xtra/ESPN+ | | Southern Utah | W 82–71 | 11–4 (1–0) | 23 – Grant-Foster | 15 – Brennan | 5 – Harrison | GCU Arena (7,398); Phoenix, AZ |
| January 9, 2025; 6:00 p.m., ESPN+ | | at Utah Valley | L 64–72 | 11–5 (1–1) | 22 – Grant-Foster | 8 – Grant-Foster | 3 – 2 tied | UCCU Center (2,351); Orem, UT |
| January 16, 2025; 7:00 p.m., Fox 10 Xtra/ESPN+ | | Abilene Christian; Black Out | W 88–58 | 12–5 (2–1) | 16 – Brennan | 10 – Brennan | 5 – Williams | GCU Arena (7,129); Phoenix, AZ |
| January 18, 2025; 6:00 p.m., Fox 10 Xtra/ESPN+ | | Tarleton State; God Bless America Night | W 88–64 | 13–5 (3–1) | 17 – Grant-Foster | 6 – Moore | 7 – Williams | GCU Arena (7,105); Phoenix, AZ |
| January 23, 2025; 6:30 p.m., ESPN+ | | at Southern Utah | W 74–59 | 14–5 (4–1) | 20 – Coles | 13 – Brennan | 4 – 2 tied | America First Event Center; Cedar City, UT |
| January 25, 2025; 7:00 p.m., ESPN+ | | at Utah Tech | W 79–66 | 15–5 (5–1) | 18 – Coles | 12 – Brennan | 4 – Williams | Burns Arena (2,993); St. George, UT |
| January 30, 2025; 7:00 p.m., Fox 10 Xtra/ESPNU/ESPN+ | | Seattle; White Out | W 83–74 | 16–5 (6–1) | 24 – Grant-Foster | 8 – Brennan | 6 – Coles | GCU Arena (7,191); Phoenix, AZ |
| February 1, 2025; 6:00 p.m., Fox 10 Xtra/ESPN+ | | Utah Valley; Camo Night | W 75–57 | 17–5 (7–1) | 16 – 2 tied | 12 – Brennan | 3 – Coles | GCU Arena (7,219); Phoenix, AZ |
| February 8, 2025; 6:00 p.m., ESPN+ | | at California Baptist | L 71–85 | 17–6 (7–2) | 15 – Grant-Foster | 9 – Brennan | 4 – Williams | Fowler Events Center (4,174); Riverside, CA |
| February 13, 2025; 6:00 p.m., ESPN+ | | Tarleton State | W 64–60 | 18–6 (8–2) | 19 – Grant-Foster | 14 – Brennan | 5 – Harrison | Wisdom Gym (1,786); Stephenville, TX |
| February 15, 2025; 1:00 p.m., ESPN+ | | at UT Arlington | W 82–75 | 19–6 (9–2) | 19 – Harrison | 8 – Coles | 5 – 2 tied | College Park Center (1,574); Arlington, TX |
| February 22, 2025; 6:00 p.m., Fox 10 Xtra/ESPN+ | | California Baptist; Homecoming/Purple Out | W 66–64 | 20–6 (10–2) | 18 – Coles | 12 – Brennan | 2 – 2 tied | GCU Arena (7,286); Phoenix, AZ |
| February 27, 2025; 7:00 p.m., Fox 10 Xtra/ESPN+ | | UT Arlington; ElectroLope | W 85–71 | 21–6 (11–2) | 19 – Harrison | 8 – Coles | 7 – Moore | GCU Arena (7,186); Phoenix, AZ |
| March 1, 2025; 8:00 p.m., ESPN+ | | at Seattle | W 63–60 | 22–6 (12–2) | 18 – Brennan | 12 – 2 tied | 4 – Coles | Redhawk Center (999); Seattle, WA |
| March 6, 2025; 7:00 p.m., Fox 10 Xtra/ESPN+ | | Utah Tech; Senior Night | W 90–68 | 23–6 (13–2) | 19 – Coles | 10 – Brennan | 5 – Moore | GCU Arena; Phoenix, AZ |
| March 8, 2025; 2:00 p.m., ESPN+ | | at Abilene Christian | L 81–82 ^{OT} | 23–7 (13–3) | 17 – Coles | 9 – Brennan | 4 – Phipps | Moody Coliseum (1,851); Abilene, TX |
WAC tournament
| March 12, 2025; 9:30 p.m., ESPN+ | (2) | (7) UT Arlington; Quarterfinals | W 98–75 | 24–7 | 24 – Coles | 7 – Coles | 6 – Moore | Orleans Arena (1,645); Paradise, NV |
| March 14, 2025; 9:30 p.m., ESPN+ | (2) | (3) California Baptist; Semifinals | W 75–66 | 25–7 | 22 – Coles | 6 – Brennan | 2 – 2 tied | Orleans Arena (3,867); Paradise, NV |
| March 15, 2025; 9:40 p.m., ESPN2 | (2) | (1) Utah Valley; Championship | W 89–82 | 26–7 | 18 – Harrison | 10 – Brennan | 4 – Harrison | Orleans Arena (3,780); Paradise, NV |
NCAA tournament
| March 21, 2025*; 1:35 pm, TBS | (13 W) | vs. (4 W) No. 11 Maryland; First Round | L 49–81 | 26–8 | 23 – Grant-Foster | 8 – Brennan | 3 – Grant-Foster | Climate Pledge Arena (17,024); Seattle, WA |
*Non-conference game. ^{#}Rankings from AP poll. (#) Tournament seedings in parentheses. W=West. All times are in Mountain.
