= 2024–25 San Diego Toreros men's basketball team =

American college basketball season

2024–25 San Diego Toreros men's basketball
- Conference: West Coast Conference
- Record: 6–27 (2–16 WCC)
- Head coach: Steve Lavin (3rd season)
- Assistant coaches: Justin Hutson (1st season); Earl Watson (1st season); John Moore (3rd season); Patrick Sandle (3rd season)
- Home arena: Jenny Craig Pavilion

2024–25 West Coast Conference men's basketball standings
	Conf.				Overall
Team	W		L	PCT	W		L	PCT
No. 24 Saint Mary's	17	–	1	.944	29	–	6	.829
No. 23 Gonzaga †	14	–	4	.778	26	–	9	.743
San Francisco	13	–	5	.722	25	–	10	.714
Santa Clara	12	–	6	.667	21	–	13	.618
Oregon State	10	–	8	.556	20	–	13	.606
Washington State	8	–	10	.444	19	–	15	.559
Loyola Marymount	8	–	10	.444	17	–	15	.531
Portland	7	–	11	.389	12	–	20	.375
Pepperdine	4	–	14	.222	13	–	22	.371
Pacific	4	–	14	.222	9	–	24	.273
San Diego	2	–	16	.111	6	–	27	.182
† 2025 WCC tournament winner Rankings from AP poll

The 2024–25 San Diego Toreros men's basketball team represented the University of San Diego during the 2024–25 NCAA Division I men's basketball season. The Toreros, led by third-year head coach Steve Lavin, played their home games at the Jenny Craig Pavilion in San Diego, California, as members of the West Coast Conference (WCC). They finished the season 6–27, 2–16 in WCC play to finish in last place. They defeated Pacific in the first round of the WCC tournament before losing to Loyola Marymount.

== Previous season ==
The Toreros finished the 2023–24 season 18–15, 7–9 in WCC play, to finish in fifth place. As the No. 5 seed in the WCC tournament, they defeated Pepperdine in the second round, before losing to Santa Clara in the quarterfinals.

== Offseason ==
=== Departures ===
Name	Number	Pos.	Height	Weight	Year	Hometown	Reason for departure
Kevin Patton Jr.	0	G	6' 8"	197	Freshman	Temecula, CA	Transferred to USC
Wayne McKinney III	3	G	6' 0"	190	Junior	Coronado, CA	Transferred to San Diego State
Deuce Turner	4	G	6' 2"	185	Junior	Coatesville, PA	Transferred to UCSB
Kollen Murphy	8	G	6' 2"	175	Freshman	Pomona, CA	Walk-on; left the team
PJ Hayes	21	F	6' 6"	215	Senior	Waconia, MN	Graduate transferred to Rutgers
Jimmy Oladokun Jr.	23	F	6' 9"	220	Freshman	Los Angeles, CA	Transferred to Rice

=== Incoming transfers ===
Name	Num	Pos.	Height	Weight	Year	Hometown	Previous school
KJay Bradley	0	G	6' 1"	175	Junior	Los Angeles, CA	San Diego City College
Colby Brooks	14	F	6' 7"	215	(redshirt) Senior	Los Angeles, CA	Walk-on; Gonzaga
Kody Clouet	21	G	6' 5"	210	Senior	San Marcos, CA	Southeastern Oklahoma State

=== Recruiting classes ===
==== 2024 recruiting class ====
College recruiting information
Name	Hometown	School	Height	Weight	Commit date
Chas Lewless; PG	Detroit, MI	Martin Luther King High School	6 ft 3 in (1.91 m)	170 lb (77 kg)	
Chas Lewless; PG	Recruit ratings: Scout: Rivals: 247Sports: (0)				
Gavin Ripp; PF	San Jose, CA	Archbishop Mitty High School	6 ft 7 in (2.01 m)	N/A	Jul 1, 2023
Gavin Ripp; PF	Recruit ratings: Scout: Rivals: 247Sports: (0)				
Jackson Gaffney; SG	Radnor, PA	Rocktop Academy	6 ft 8 in (2.03 m)	N/A	Jun 20, 2024
Jackson Gaffney; SG	Recruit ratings: Scout: Rivals: 247Sports: (0)				
Kean Webb; C	Draper, UT	Golden State Prep of Napa Christian	6 ft 11 in (2.11 m)	N/A	May 7, 2024
Kean Webb; C	Recruit ratings: Scout: Rivals: 247Sports: (0)				
Overall recruit ranking: Scout: nr Rivals: nr ESPN: nr
Note: In many cases, Scout, Rivals, 247Sports, On3, and ESPN may conflict in their listings of height and weight.; In these cases, the average was taken. ESPN grades are on a 100-point scale.; Sources: "San Diego Toreros 2024 Basketball Commitments". Rivals.; "2024 San Diego Toreros Basketball Commits". Scout.; "ESPN 2024 San Diego Toreros Basketball recruits". ESPN.; "Scout.com Team Recruiting Rankings". Scout.; "2024 Team Ranking". Rivals.

==== 2025 recruiting class ====
College recruiting information (2025)
Name	Hometown	School	Height	Weight	Commit date
D'Arrae Goodwin; PF	Wheeling, WV	Linsley School	6 ft 6 in (1.98 m)	185 lb (84 kg)	Aug 7, 2024
D'Arrae Goodwin; PF	Recruit ratings: Scout: Rivals: 247Sports: (0)				
Overall recruit ranking: Scout: nr Rivals: nr ESPN: nr
Note: In many cases, Scout, Rivals, 247Sports, On3, and ESPN may conflict in their listings of height and weight.; In these cases, the average was taken. ESPN grades are on a 100-point scale.; Sources: "San Diego Toreros 2025 Basketball Commitments". Rivals.; "2025 San Diego Toreros Basketball Commits". Scout.; "ESPN 2025 San Diego Toreros Basketball recruits". ESPN.; "Scout.com Team Recruiting Rankings". Scout.; "2025 Team Ranking". Rivals.

== Roster ==
2024–25 San Diego Toreros men's basketball team
Players
Coaches

Pos.	#	Name	Height	Weight	Year	Previous school	Hometown
G	0	Kjay Bradley	6 ft 1 in (1.85 m)	180 lb (82 kg)	Jr	Crenshaw HS; San Diego City College	Los Angeles, CA
F	1	Santiago Trouet	6 ft 10 in (2.08 m)	218 lb (99 kg)	So		Buenos Aires, Argentina
G	2	Chas Lewless	6 ft 2 in (1.88 m)	175 lb (79 kg)	Fr	Martin Luther King HS	Detroit, MI
G	3	Keyon Kensie	6 ft 7 in (2.01 m)	200 lb (91 kg)	So	Taft HS	Los Angeles, CA
F	4	David Simon	6 ft 11 in (2.11 m)	190 lb (86 kg)	So	Royal Crown School	Windsor, ON
F	5	Bendji Pierre	6 ft 8 in (2.03 m)	230 lb (104 kg)	Sr	The Patrick School; Indian River State College	Irvington, NJ
G	6	Tony Duckett (W)	6 ft 5 in (1.96 m)	185 lb (84 kg)	Fr	Carlsbad HS	Carlsbad, CA
G	7	Dragos Lungu	6 ft 6 in (1.98 m)	189 lb (86 kg)	So	NBA Global Academy	Cluj-Napoca, Romania
G	10	Neel Beniwal (W)	6 ft 5 in (1.96 m)	180 lb (82 kg)	Jr	The Phelps School	Garnet Valley, PA
G	11	Deven Dahlke (W)	6 ft 2 in (1.88 m)	190 lb (86 kg)	GS	St. Mary's HS; Drake	Phoenix, AZ
G/F	12	Gavin Ripp	6 ft 7 in (2.01 m)	225 lb (102 kg)	Fr	Archbishop Mitty HS	Los Gatos, CA
F	14	Colby Brooks (W)	6 ft 7 in (2.01 m)	215 lb (98 kg)	RS Jr	Loyola HS; Gonzaga	Los Angeles, CA
G	15	Josh Hecht (W)	6 ft 2 in (1.88 m)	184 lb (83 kg)	So	Santa Monica HS	Santa Monica, CA
G	20	Joey Chammaa (W)	5 ft 11 in (1.8 m)	180 lb (82 kg)	So	Southern California Academy	Los Angeles, CA
G	21	Kody Clouet	6 ft 5 in (1.96 m)	210 lb (95 kg)	Sr	San Marcos HS; Saint Kathrine	San Marcos, CA
G	22	Emmanuel Callas (W)	6 ft 5 in (1.96 m)	215 lb (98 kg)	Jr	Campolindo HS	Oakland, CA
F	23	Kean Webb	6 ft 11 in (2.11 m)	230 lb (104 kg)	Fr	American Fork HS	St. George, UT
C	24	Steven II Jamerson (W)	6 ft 10 in (2.08 m)	210 lb (95 kg)	Sr	Crespi Carmlite HS	Los Angeles, CA
G	25	Jackson Gaffney	6 ft 8 in (2.03 m)	—	Fr	Rocktop Academy	Villanova, PA
G	33	Dominic Muncey	6 ft 0 in (1.83 m)	175 lb (79 kg)	Sr	Cathedral Catholic HS	San Diego, CA
G	53	Nick Del Bosque (W)	6 ft 0 in (1.83 m)	175 lb (79 kg)	Fr	Salpointe Catholic HS	Tucson, AZ

Head coach

- Steve Lavin (Chapman University)

Assistant coach(es)

- Justin Hutson (Cal State Bakersfield)
- Earl Watson (UCLA)
- John Moore (Cypress College)
- Patrick Sandle (San Francisco State)

Legend

- (C) Team captain
- (S) Suspended
- (I) Ineligible
- (W) Walk-on
- Injured
- Current redshirt

Roster
Last update: December 19, 2024

== Schedule and results ==
Date time, TV	Rank^{#}	Opponent^{#}	Result	Record	High points	High rebounds	High assists	Site (attendance) city, state
Exhibition
November 1, 2024*; 7:00 p.m., ESPN+		Sonoma State	W 73–61		17 – Kensie	10 – Trouet	4 – Bradley Jr.	Jenny Craig Pavilion (2); San Diego, CA
Non-conference regular season
November 6, 2024*; 8:00 p.m., ESPN+		Rider	L 67–68	0–1	24 – Bradley Jr.	13 – Trouet	3 – Tied	Jenny Craig Pavilion; San Diego, CA
November 8, 2024*; 7:00 p.m., ESPN+		Boston University	W 74–60	1–1	28 – Bradley Jr.	10 – Trouet	7 – Bradley Jr.	Jenny Craig Pavilion (731); San Diego, CA
November 12, 2024*; 7:00 p.m., ESPN+		Portland State	L 76–85	1–2	20 – Kensie	9 – Jamerson II	3 – Kensie	Jenny Craig Pavilion (507); San Diego, CA
November 16, 2024*; 12:00 p.m., ESPN+		Idaho State	L 66–78	1–3	15 – Clouet	8 – Jamerson II	4 – Bradley Jr.	Jenny Craig Pavilion (297); San Diego, CA
November 22, 2024*; 7:00 p.m., ESPN+		Southern Utah; San Diego Multi-Team Event	L 67–72	1–4	27 – Bradley Jr.	9 – Jamerson II	3 – Jamerson II	Jenny Craig Pavilion (380); San Diego, CA
November 24, 2024*; 2:00 p.m., ESPN+		Idaho; San Diego Multi-Team Event	W 68–61	2–4	18 – Trouet	10 – Trouet	4 – Bradley Jr.	Jenny Craig Pavilion (507); San Diego, CA
November 27, 2024*; 7:00 p.m., ESPN+		Marian (WI)	W 69–64	3–4	16 – Duckett	13 – Trouet	5 – Bradley Jr.	Jenny Craig Pavilion (323); San Diego, CA
December 3, 2024*; 6:00 p.m., ESPN+		at Arizona State	L 53–90	3–5	15 – Bradley Jr.	6 – Tied	4 – Dahlke	Desert Financial Arena (6,633); Tempe, AZ
December 7, 2024*; 7:00 p.m., YurView		at No. 24 San Diego State; City Championship	L 57–74	3–6	17 – Pierre	9 – Trouet	4 – Bradley Jr.	Viejas Arena (12,414); San Diego, CA
December 10, 2024*; 7:00 p.m., ESPN+		Long Beach State	L 70–76	3–7	19 – Bradley Jr.	10 – Jamerson II	6 – Bradley Jr.	Jenny Craig Pavilion (531); San Diego, CA
December 14, 2024*; 4:00 p.m., MW Network		at Fresno State	L 65–73	3–8	17 – Bradley Jr.	13 – Jamerson II	5 – Bradley Jr.	Save Mart Center (4,325); Fresno, CA
December 21, 2024*; 7:00 p.m., ESPN+		UC San Diego	L 71–77	3–9	14 – Chammaa	20 – Trouet	3 – Tied	Jenny Craig Pavilion (1,350); San Diego, CA
December 28, 2024*; 3:30 p.m.		vs. Grand Canyon; West Coast Hoops Showdown	L 55–68	3–10	20 – Bradley Jr.	14 – Trouet	2 – Tied	Intuit Dome (12,272); Inglewood, CA
WCC regular season
December 30, 2024; 7:00 p.m., ESPN+		Pacific	W 75–65	4–10 (1–0)	21 – Jamerson II	11 – Jamerson II	7 – Bradley Jr.	Jenny Craig Pavilion (627); San Diego, CA
January 2, 2025; 7:00 p.m., ESPN+		Santa Clara	L 80–81	4–11 (1–1)	23 – Bradley Jr.	11 – Trouet	6 – Bradley Jr.	Jenny Craig Pavilion (782); San Diego, CA
January 4, 2025; 2:00 p.m., ESPN+		at Oregon State	L 54–81	4–12 (1–2)	12 – Duckett	8 – Jameson II	3 – Chammaa	Gill Coliseum (3,120); Corvallis, OR
January 8, 2025; 6:00 p.m., ESPN+		at No. 18 Gonzaga	L 80–93	4–13 (1–3)	21 – Bradley Jr.	7 – Trouet	4 – Bradley Jr.	McCarthey Athletic Center (6,000); Spokane, WA
January 11, 2025; 7:00 p.m., ESPN+		Saint Mary's	L 56–103	4–14 (1–4)	14 – Chammaa	3 – Tied	2 – Tied	Jenny Craig Pavilion (1,349); San Diego, CA
January 16, 2025; 7:00 p.m., ESPN+		Washington State	L 61–65	4–15 (1–5)	17 – Trouet	9 – Tied	2 – Tied	Jenny Craig Pavilion (1,337); San Diego, CA
January 18, 2025; 6:00 p.m., ESPN+		at Loyola Marymount	L 70–77	4–16 (1–6)	31 – Duckett	8 – Trouet	5 – Chammaa	Gersten Pavilion (1,152); Los Angeles, CA
January 23, 2025; 7:00 p.m., ESPN+		at Portland	L 82–92	4–17 (1–7)	19 – Clouet	10 – Jamerson II	5 – Chammaa	Chiles Center (1,014); Portland, OR
January 25, 2025; 7:00 p.m., ESPN+		at San Francisco	L 69–81	4–18 (1–8)	17 – Duckett	9 – Jamerson II	2 – Tied	Sobrato Center (2,985); San Francisco, CA
January 30, 2025; 7:00 p.m., ESPN+		Pepperdine	L 90–98	4–19 (1–9)	24 – Chammaa	9 – Trouet	9 – Chammaa	Jenny Craig Pavilion (821); San Diego, CA
February 1, 2025; 2:00 p.m., ESPN+		Loyola Marymount	L 62–78	4–20 (1–10)	13 – Chammaa	15 – Jamerson II	2 – Tied	Jenny Craig Pavilion (987); San Diego, CA
February 6, 2025; 7:00 p.m., ESPN+		at Pacific	L 69–71	4–21 (1–11)	18 – Trouet	7 – Trouet	4 – Webb	Alex G. Spanos Center (1,284); Stockton, CA
February 8, 2025; 4:00 p.m., ESPN+		at Santa Clara	L 70–93	4–22 (1–12)	21 – Jamerson II	9 – Jamerson II	5 – Duckett	Leavey Center (2,227); Santa Clara, CA
February 13, 2025; 7:00 p.m., ESPN+		at Pepperdine	L 81–88	4–23 (1–13)	24 – Jamerson II	9 – Jamerson II	5 – Dahlke	Firestone Fieldhouse (710); Malibu, CA
February 15, 2025; 7:00 p.m., ESPN+		San Francisco	L 61–84	4–24 (1–14)	15 – Clouet	10 – Jamerson II	3 – Dahlke	Jenny Craig Pavilion (1,472); San Diego, CA
February 22, 2025; 2:00 p.m., ESPN+		Oregon State	L 73–83	4–25 (1–15)	19 – Clouet	10 – Jamerson II	5 – Duckett	Jenny Craig Pavilion (2,036); San Diego, CA
February 27, 2025; 6:30 p.m., ESPN+		at Washington State	L 86–93	4–26 (1–16)	21 – Tied	11 – Jamerson II	5 – Chammaa	Beasley Coliseum (3,233); Pullman, WA
March 1, 2025; 2:00 p.m., ESPN+		Portland	W 82–80	5–26 (2–16)	35 – Clouet	7 – Jamerson II	7 – Duckett	Jenny Craig Pavilion (987); San Diego, CA
WCC tournament
March 6, 2025; 2:30 p.m., ESPN+	(11)	vs. (10) Pacific; First round	W 81–77	6–26	21 – Duckett	8 – Jamerson II	3 – Clouet	Orleans Arena (1,011); Paradise, NV
March 7, 2025; 8:30 p.m., ESPN+	(11)	vs. (7) Loyola Marymount; Second round	L 74–100	6–27	17 – Duckett	7 – Jamerson II	6 – Chammaa	Orleans Arena (1,826); Paradise, NV
*Non-conference game. ^{#}Rankings from AP poll. (#) Tournament seedings in parentheses. All times are in Pacific.
