= Burns Arena =

Indoor arena at Utah Tech University

- Location in Utah Location in the United States
- Location: 400 South 700 East; St. George, Utah, U.S.
- Coordinates: 37.101°N 113.566°W
- Owner: Utah Tech University
- Operator: Utah Tech University
- Capacity: 4,779
- Record attendance: 4,257 (January 11, 2019; men's basketball vs. MSU Denver)

Construction
- Opened: 1986

Tenants
- Utah Tech Trailblazers (NCAA) (1986–present)

Burns Arena is a multi-purpose arena in St. George, Utah, United States. It is the home of the Utah Tech Trailblazers basketball and volleyball teams. Its capacity is 5,000 people. It is located near Bruce Hurst Field and Greater Zion Stadium. There are 4,779 permanent seats at Burns Arena in 14 sections. It was built in 1987 as the Dixie Center. By the time the current incarnation of Dixie Center opened in 1998, the arena took its present name. It is named after M. Anthony Burns.

During the 2020–2021 pandemic year, the University of New Mexico's men's basketball team temporarily relocated to the Burns Arena in January 2021 due to pandemic restrictions in New Mexico. The Lobos played three games in Burns Arena, beating Dixie State 72–63, and then splitting a pair of games with San Jose State.

In 2006, UNLV played a home game against Northern Arizona in the Burns Arena. The Rebels won 93–53.

On October 13, 1988, the Utah Jazz defeated the Indiana Pacers, 104–95, in a pre-season game played at the Burns Arena. Karl Malone scored 27 points and John Stockton added 18 points and 11 assists to lead the Jazz. Chuck Person had 22 points for the Pacers.

When Dixie State competed in junior college basketball, the arena was the cite of numerous Scenic West Athletic Conference tournaments and the annual rivalry between Dixie and the College of Southern Idaho, SWAC rivals and national JUCO powerhouses. The Burns Arena served as the home arena for the 2002 Dixie State team that won the national junior college men's basketball championship.

After Dixie State moved up to Division II, the Burns Arena served as the team's home as they competed first in the Pacific West Conference and then the Rocky Mountain Athletic Conference. The Red Storm, as the team was known at the time, clinched its first Pac-West regular season title with a win at the Burns Arena in 2010. That team, led by Tom Whitehead, eventually made the Sweet 16. After Dixie State advanced to Division I, the arena has been one of the arenas of the Western Athletic Conference.

The arena is located on 400 South and 700 East in St. George.

It is also the site of the Buck-A-Thon and the World Senior Games. Many concerts, high school tournaments, and boxing matches also take place in this facility.
