= 2024–25 Big Sky Conference men's basketball season =

College basketball season

2024–25 Big Sky men's basketball season
- League: NCAA Division I
- Sport: Men's basketball
- Teams: 10

Regular season
- Season champions: Montana, Northern Colorado
- Season MVP: Dylan Darling, Idaho State

Tournament
- Champions: Montana

Basketball seasons
- ← 2023–24 2025–26 →

2024–25 Big Sky men's basketball standings
	Conf.				Overall
Team	W		L	PCT	W		L	PCT
Northern Colorado	15	–	3	.833	25	–	10	.714
Montana †	15	–	3	.833	25	–	10	.714
Portland State	11	–	7	.611	19	–	13	.594
Idaho State	10	–	8	.556	15	–	15	.500
Montana State	9	–	9	.500	15	–	18	.455
Idaho	8	–	10	.444	14	–	19	.424
Northern Arizona	8	–	10	.444	18	–	16	.529
Eastern Washington	6	–	12	.333	10	–	22	.313
Weber State	5	–	13	.278	12	–	22	.353
Sacramento State	3	–	15	.167	7	–	25	.219
† 2025 Big Sky tournament winner

The 2024–25 Big Sky Conference men's basketball season began with practices in September 2024 and will end with the 2025 Big Sky Conference men's basketball tournament in March 2025.

== Head coaches ==
=== Coaching Changes ===
Dan Monson was named head coach at Eastern Washington on April 12, 2024.

David Patrick resigned as Sacramento State's head coach on May 22, 2024, to become associate head coach at LSU. Michael Czepil, an assistant with Sacramento State, was then named interim head coach for the 2024–2025 season.

=== Coaches ===
Team	Head coach	Previous job	Season	Overall record	Big Sky record	NCAA Tournaments
Eastern Washington	Dan Monson	Marquette (asst.)	1st	10–21 (.323)	6–12 (.333)	0
Idaho	Alex Pribble	Seattle (asst.)	2nd	24–39 (.381)	13–23 (.361)	0
Idaho State	Ryan Looney	Point Loma	6th	68–111 (.380)	42–66 (.389)	0
Montana	Travis DeCuire	California (asst.)	11th	233–133 (.637)	140–61 (.697)	3
Montana State	Matt Logie	Point Loma	2nd	31–35 (.470)	18–18 (.500)	1
Northern Arizona	Shane Burcar	Northern Arizona (asst.)	6th	74–109 (.404)	39–70 (.358)	0
Northern Colorado	Steve Smiley	Northern Colorado (asst.)	5th	87–69 (.558)	51–36 (.586)	0
Portland State	Jase Coburn	Portland State (asst.)	4th	62–63 (.496)	34–38 (.472)	0
Sacramento State	Michael Czepil (interim)	Sacramento State (asst.)	1st	7–24 (.226)	3–15 (.167)	0
Weber State	Eric Duft	Weber State (asst.)	3rd	49–48 (.505)	28–26 (.519)	0

Notes:

- Season/record numbers and NCAA Tournament appearances include the 2024–25 season.

== Preseason ==
=== Preseason coaches poll ===
2024–25 Big Sky Preseason Coaches Poll
Rank	Team (First place votes)	Points
1	Montana (7)	78
2	Montana State (2)	72
3	Northern Colorado	62
4	Weber State (1)	61
5	Northern Arizona	51
6	Portland State	38
7	Idaho	26
8	Idaho State	21
9	Eastern Washington	19
10	Sacramento State	19

=== Preseason All-Conference Team ===
First team
Trent McLaughlin, Northern Arizona
Brian Goracke, Montana State
Brandon Whitney, Montana
Miguel Tomley, Weber State
Brandon Walker, Montana State
Julius Mims, Idaho
Preseason MVP: Trent McLaughlin, Northern Arizona

== Regular season ==
=== Player of the Week awards ===
Week	Player of the Week
1	Andrew Cook, Eastern Washington
2	Money Williams, Montana
3	Langston Reynolds, Northern Colorado
4	Joe Pridgen, Montana
5	Carson Towt, Northern Arizona
6	Langston Reynolds, (2) Northern Colorado Miguel Tomley, Weber State
7	Kolten Mitchell, Idaho Carson Towt (2), Northern Arizona
8	Jacob Holt, Sacramento State
9	Langston Reynolds, (3) Northern Colorado Money Williams, (2) Montana
10	Dyson Koehler, Weber State
11	Collen Hollenbeck, Idaho State
12	Isaiah Hawthorne, Northern Colorado
13	Dylan Darling, Idaho State
14	Dylan Darling, (2) Idaho State
15	Jaylin Henderson, Portland State
16	Dylan Darling, (3) Idaho State
17	Jaron Rillie, Northern Colorado

School	POTW
Eastern Washington	1
Idaho	1
Idaho State	4
Montana	3
Montana State	0
Northern Arizona	2
Northern Colorado	5
Portland State	1
Sacramento State	1
Weber State	2

== Postseason ==
=== Big Sky tournament ===
The conference tournament will be played from March 8 to March 12, 2025, at the Idaho Central Arena in Boise, Idaho. The top six teams receive a first round bye.

=== NCAA Tournament ===
As the conference champion, Montana received an automatic bid to the 2025 NCAA Division I men's basketball tournament.

Seed	Region	School	First Four	First round	Second round	Sweet Sixteen	Elite Eight	Final Four	Championship
14	East	Montana	—N/a	L 66-85 vs. (3) Wisconsin	―	―	―	―	―

== Conference awards ==
2025 Big Sky Men's Basketball Individual Awards
Award	Recipient(s)
Player of the Year	Dylan Darling, Idaho State
Coach of the Year	Travis DeCuire, Montana
Defensive Player of the Year	Tre-Vaughn Minott, Portland State
Top Reserve	Money Williams, Montana
Freshman of the Year	Evan Otten, Idaho State
Newcomer of the Year	Dylan Darling, Idaho State

2025 Big Sky Men's Basketball All-Conference Teams
First Team	Second Team	Honorable Mention	Defensive Team
Dylan Darling, Idaho State; Langston Reynolds, Northern Colorado; Trent McLaughlin, Northern Arizona; Blaise Threatt, Weber State; Joe Pridgen, Montana; Isaiah Hawthorne, Northern Colorado; Jaron Rillie, Northern Colorado	Malik Moore, Montana; Carson Towt, Northern Arizona; Terri Miller Jr., Portland State; Jacob Holt, Sacramento State; Money Williams, Montana; Brandon Whitney, Montana	Jaylin Henderson, Portland State; Qiant Myers, Portland State; Jake O'Neil, Idaho State; Brandon Walker, Montana State; Jack Payne, Idaho	Tre-Vaughn Minott, Portland State; Carson Towt, Northern Arizona; Brandon Whitney, Montana; Jake O'Neil, Idaho State; Zach Bloch, Northern Colorado
