= 2024–25 Montana State Bobcats men's basketball team =

American college basketball season

2024–25 Montana State Bobcats men's basketball
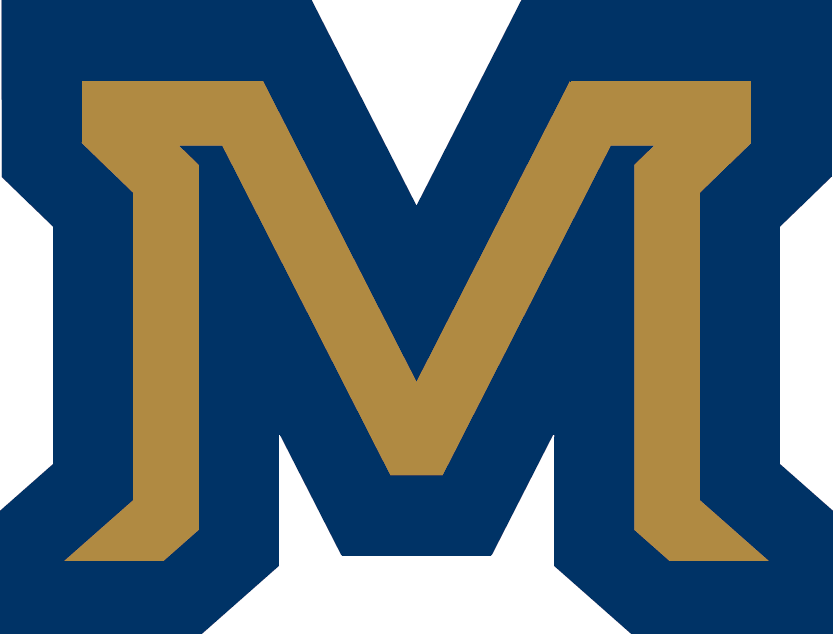
- Conference: Big Sky Conference
- Record: 15–18 (9–9 Big Sky)
- Head coach: Matt Logie (2nd season)
- Assistant coaches: Zach Payne; Sam Scholl; Xavier Bishop
- Home arena: Worthington Arena

2024–25 Big Sky men's basketball standings
	Conf.				Overall
Team	W		L	PCT	W		L	PCT
Northern Colorado	15	–	3	.833	25	–	10	.714
Montana †	15	–	3	.833	25	–	10	.714
Portland State	11	–	7	.611	19	–	13	.594
Idaho State	10	–	8	.556	15	–	15	.500
Montana State	9	–	9	.500	15	–	18	.455
Idaho	8	–	10	.444	14	–	19	.424
Northern Arizona	8	–	10	.444	18	–	16	.529
Eastern Washington	6	–	12	.333	10	–	22	.313
Weber State	5	–	13	.278	12	–	22	.353
Sacramento State	3	–	15	.167	7	–	25	.219
† 2025 Big Sky tournament winner

The 2024–25 Montana State Bobcats men's basketball team represented Montana State University during the 2024–25 NCAA Division I men's basketball season. The Bobcats, led by second-year head coach Matt Logie, played their home games at Worthington Arena inside Brick Breeden Fieldhouse in Bozeman, Montana as members of the Big Sky Conference. This was the first time since 2021 that Montana State failed to qualify for the NCAA Tournament.

== Previous season ==
The Bobcats finished the 2023–24 season 17–18, 9–9 in Big Sky play, to finish in fifth place. They defeated Weber State, Sacramento State and Montana to win their third consecutive Big Sky tournament title, and earn the conference's automatic bid to the NCAA tournament. They received the #16 seed in the Midwest Region, where they would fall to fellow #16 seed Grambling State in the First Four.

== Offseason ==
=== Departures ===
Departures
Name	Number	Pos.	Height	Weight	Year	Hometown	Notes
Aiden Gair	0	G	6' 5"	198	Junior	Williamsport, PA	Transferred to Millersville
Eddie Turner III	3	G	6' 2"	183	Graduate student	Seattle, WA	
Jaqari Miles	4	G	6' 4"	180	Freshman	Los Angeles, CA	Transferred to Fullerton College
Jaden Geron	5	F	6' 8"	190	Junior	Fresno, CA	Transferred to Fresno Pacific
Carter Ash	14	G	6' 0"	165	Junior	Bozeman, MT	Graduated
John Olmsted	15	F	6' 10"	235	Graduate student	Morenci, AZ	Graduated
Robert Ford III	20	G	6' 0"	180	(redshirt) Senior	Portland, OR	Graduated
Royce Robinson	50	G	6' 5"	200	Freshman	Lewistown, MT	Transferred to Rocky Mountain College

=== Incoming transfers ===
Incoming transfers
Name	Number	Pos.	Height	Weight	Year	Hometown	Previous school
Jeremiah Davis	0	G	6' 4"	185	Junior	Fountain Valley, CA	Fullerton College
Jabe Mullins	3	G	6' 6"	200	Graduate student	Snoqualmie, WA	Washington State
Bryce Zephir	5	G	6' 4"	200	Junior	Carson, CA	Salt Lake CC
Max Agbonkpolo	7	F	6' 9"	200	Graduate student	Laguna Niguel, CA	Utah State
BJ Kolly	8	F	6' 10"	235	Junior	Everett, WA	Western Washington

=== Recruiting class ===
College recruiting information
Name	Hometown	School	Height	Weight	Commit date
Trap Johnson; G	Belton, TX	Belton High School	6 ft 6 in (1.98 m)	200 lb (91 kg)	Sep 30, 2023
Trap Johnson; G	Recruit ratings: Scout: Rivals: 247Sports: (NR)				
Myles Moskowitz; G	Boulder, CO	Fairview High School	5 ft 11 in (1.80 m)	145 lb (66 kg)	
Myles Moskowitz; G	Recruit ratings: Scout: Rivals: 247Sports: (NR)				
Grayson Gaddis; F	Salt Lake City, UT	Highland High School	6 ft 7 in (2.01 m)	215 lb (98 kg)	
Grayson Gaddis; F	Recruit ratings: Scout: Rivals: 247Sports: (NR)				
Overall recruit ranking: 247Sports: 192
Note: In many cases, Scout, Rivals, 247Sports, On3, and ESPN may conflict in their listings of height and weight.; In these cases, the average was taken. ESPN grades are on a 100-point scale.; Sources: "2024 Team Ranking". Rivals.

== Roster ==
2024–25 Montana State Bobcats men's basketball team
Players
Coaches

Pos.	#	Name	Height	Weight	Year	Previous school	Hometown
G	0	Jeremiah Davis	6 ft 4 in (1.93 m)	180 lb (82 kg)	Jr	Fullerton College	Fountain Valley, CA
G	1	Patrick McMahon	6 ft 7 in (2.01 m)	190 lb (86 kg)	Sr	Colony High School	Palmer, AK
F	2	Brandon Walker	6 ft 7 in (2.01 m)	250 lb (113 kg)	Jr	UT Arlington	Oak Cliff, TX
G	3	Jabe Mullins	6 ft 6 in (1.98 m)	200 lb (91 kg)	GS	Washington State	Snoqualmie, WA
G	5	Bryce Zephir	6 ft 4 in (1.93 m)	195 lb (88 kg)	Jr	Salt Lake Community College	Carson, CA
F	7	Max Agbonkpolo	6 ft 9 in (2.06 m)	194 lb (88 kg)	GS	Utah State	Laguna Niguel, CA
F	8	BJ Kolly	6 ft 10 in (2.08 m)	225 lb (102 kg)	Jr	Western Washington	Everett, WA
G	10	Trap Johnson	6 ft 6 in (1.98 m)	195 lb (88 kg)	Fr	Belton High School	Belton, TX
G	11	Tyler Patterson	6 ft 8 in (2.03 m)	190 lb (86 kg)	GS	Mount Si High School	Snoqualmie, WA
G	14	Myles Moskowitz	5 ft 11 in (1.8 m)	145 lb (66 kg)	Fr	Fairview High School	Boulder, CO
F	15	Grayson Gaddis	6 ft 7 in (2.01 m)	215 lb (98 kg)	Fr	Highland High School	Salt Lake City, UT
F	21	Brian Goracke	6 ft 6 in (1.98 m)	210 lb (95 kg)	Sr	Point Loma	Monroe, OR
F	22	Calum Rutherfurd	6 ft 11 in (2.11 m)	225 lb (102 kg)	So	Analy High School	Sebastopol, CA
F	23	Chika Nduka	6 ft 5 in (1.96 m)	225 lb (102 kg)	Sr	Portland	Seattle, WA
G	24	Jed Miller	6 ft 2 in (1.88 m)	175 lb (79 kg)	Jr	Southern California Academy	Agoura Hills, CA
F	25	Sam Lecholat	6 ft 7 in (2.01 m)	215 lb (98 kg)	Sr	Sheridan High School	Sheridan, WY

Head coach

- Matt Logie (Lehigh)

Assistant coach(es)

- Zach Payne (Whitworth)
- Sam Scholl (San Diego)
- Xavier Bishop (Montana State)

Legend

- (C) Team captain
- (S) Suspended
- (I) Ineligible
- (W) Walk-on
- Injured
- Current redshirt

Roster
Last update: October 14, 2024

== Schedule and results ==
Date time, TV	Rank^{#}	Opponent^{#}	Result	Record	High points	High rebounds	High assists	Site (attendance) city, state
Non-conference regular season
November 7, 2024*; 6:00 p.m., BTN+		at Wisconsin	L 67–79	0–1	14 – Goracke	7 – Mullins	4 – Mullins	Kohl Center (13,554); Madison, WI
November 9, 2024*; 5:00 p.m., ESPN+		at Wichita State	L 69–89	0–2	13 – Walker	5 – Agbonkpolo	3 – tied	Charles Koch Arena (6,179); Wichita, KS
November 11, 2024*; 7:00 p.m., ESPN+		Northwest Indian	W 93–35	1–2	13 – Walker	8 – Agbonkpolo	5 – Mullins	Worthington Arena (2,520); Bozeman, MT
November 17, 2024*; 2:00 p.m., SLN		at Denver	L 78–79	1–3	19 – Walker	10 – Walker	3 – Kolly	Hamilton Gymnasium (851); Denver, CO
November 19, 2024*; 7:00 p.m., BTN		at Northwestern	L 69–72	1–4	17 – Mullins	10 – Agbonkpolo	6 – Mullins	Welsh–Ryan Arena (5,034); Evanston, IL
November 24, 2024*; 6:00 p.m., ESPN+		Southern Miss; Basketball Travelers Invitational	W 79–59	2–4	19 – Walker	6 – Walker	5 – Miller	Worthington Arena (2,450); Bozeman, MT
November 26, 2024*; 7:00 p.m., ESPN+		Abilene Christian; Basketball Travelers Invitational	W 85–59	3–4	14 – tied	9 – Walker	7 – Mullins	Worthington Arena (2,393); Bozeman, MT
November 30, 2024*; 2:00 p.m., ESPN+		Cal State Northridge	L 69–72 ^{OT}	3–5	21 – Agbonkpolo	9 – Mullins	5 – Walker	Worthington Arena (2,467); Bozeman, MT
December 4, 2024*; 6:00 p.m.		at Omaha; Big Sky-Summit Challenge	W 76–65	4–5	17 – Walker	7 – Agbonkpolo	4 – Walker	Baxter Arena (1,424); Omaha, NE
December 7, 2024*; 6:00 p.m., ESPN+		Kansas City; Big Sky–Summit Challenge	W 74–62	5–5	17 – Agbonkpolo	9 – Agbonkpolo	4 – Zephir	Worthington Arena (2,599); Bozeman, MT
December 15, 2024*; 6:00 p.m., BTN+		at USC	L 63–89	5–6	14 – Walker	5 – McMahon	4 – Zephir	Galen Center (2,381); Los Angeles, CA
December 18, 2024*; 8:00 p.m., ESPN+		at UC Riverside	L 80–83	5–7	31 – Walker	6 – Agbonkpolo	7 – Mullins	SRC Arena (257); Riverside, CA
December 22, 2024*; 12:00 p.m., ESPN+		at TCU	L 48–82	5–8	18 – Agbonkpolo	5 – Walker	2 – tied	Schollmaier Arena (5,135); Fort Worth, TX
Big Sky regular season
January 2, 2025; 7:00 p.m., ESPN+		at Idaho	L 64–69	5–9 (0–1)	15 – McMahon	9 – Agbonkpolo	3 – Mullins	ICCU Arena (1,666); Moscow, ID
January 4, 2025; 3:00 p.m., ESPN+		at Eastern Washington	L 63–68	5–10 (0–2)	16 – Patterson	7 – McMahon	4 – McMahon	Reese Court (1,624); Cheney, WA
January 9, 2025; 7:00 p.m., ESPN+		Northern Colorado	L 82–83	5–11 (0–3)	20 – Walker	7 – Miller	5 – Mullins	Worthington Arena (2,367); Bozeman, MT
January 11, 2025; 6:00 p.m., ESPN+		Northern Arizona	W 58–53	6–11 (1–3)	17 – Walker	7 – tied	3 – Lecholat	Worthington Arena (2,772); Bozeman, MT
January 16, 2025; 6:00 p.m., ESPN+		at Idaho State	L 67–70	6–12 (1–4)	18 – tied	7 – Lecholat	2 – tied	Reed Gym (1,321); Pocatello, ID
January 18, 2025; 7:00 p.m., ESPN+		at Weber State	W 80–71	7–12 (2–4)	20 – Miller	7 – Walker	3 – tied	Dee Events Center (3,895); Ogden, UT
January 20, 2025; 7:00 p.m., ESPN+		Eastern Washington	W 74–64	8–12 (3–4)	20 – Walker	6 – Walker	4 – McMahon	Worthington Arena (3,111); Bozeman, MT
January 25, 2025; 7:00 p.m., ESPN+		at Montana	L 70–77	8–13 (3–5)	18 – McMahon	5 – tied	3 – Miller	Dahlberg Arena (5,766); Missoula, MT
January 30, 2025; 7:00 p.m., ESPN+		Sacramento State	W 70–58	9–13 (4–5)	20 – McMahon	5 – tied	4 – Miller	Worthington Arena (3,209); Bozeman, MT
February 1, 2025; 6:00 p.m., ESPN+		Portland State	W 74–73	10–13 (5–5)	21 – McMahon	9 – McMahon	4 – Miller	Worthington Arena (3,846); Bozeman, MT
February 6, 2025; 6:00 p.m., ESPN+		at Northern Arizona	L 64–69	10–14 (5–6)	16 – Mullins	8 – Mullins	5 – Miller	Findlay Toyota Court (789); Flagstaff, AZ
February 8, 2025; 6:00 p.m., ESPN+		at Northern Colorado	L 66–73	10–15 (5–7)	24 – Mullins	7 – Walker	3 – Zephir	Bank of Colorado Arena (1,672); Greeley, CO
February 13, 2025; 7:00 p.m., ESPN+		Weber State	W 74–66	11–15 (6–7)	17 – Mullins	7 – Lecholat	2 – tied	Worthington Arena (2,707); Bozeman, MT
February 15, 2025; 6:00 p.m., ESPN+		Idaho State	W 74–69	12–15 (7–7)	17 – Mullins	7 – Agbonkpolo	4 – tied	Worthington Arena (3,222); Bozeman, MT
February 22, 2025; 7:00 p.m., ESPN+		Montana	L 85–89	12–16 (7–8)	22 – McMahon	6 – tied	3 – Zephir	Worthington Arena (5,580); Bozeman, MT
February 27, 2025; 8:00 p.m., ESPN+		at Portland State	L 52–69	12–17 (7–9)	15 – Walker	7 – Walker	4 – Zephir	Viking Pavilion (986); Portland, OR
March 1, 2025; 2:00 p.m., ESPN+		at Sacramento State	W 87–60	13–17 (8–9)	26 – Patterson	5 – tied	8 – Miller	Hornets Nest (949); Sacramento, CA
March 3, 2025; 7:00 p.m., ESPN+		Idaho	W 75–60	14–17 (9–9)	23 – McMahon	7 – Miller	3 – Lecholat	Worthington Arena (3,060); Bozeman, MT
Big Sky tournament
March 10, 2025; 5:30 p.m., ESPN+	(5)	vs. (4) Idaho State; Quarterfinals	W 80–60	15–17	14 – tied	6 – tied	5 – Mullins	Idaho Central Arena; Boise, ID
March 11, 2025; 7:00 p.m., ESPNU	(5)	vs. (1) Northern Colorado; Semifinals	L 45–72	15–18	11 – Zephir	5 – tied	2 – Agbonkpolo	Idaho Central Arena; Boise, ID
*Non-conference game. ^{#}Rankings from AP poll. (#) Tournament seedings in parentheses. All times are in Mountain.
