= 2025 Big Sky Conference men's basketball tournament =

American collegiate postseason tournament

- Classification: Division I
- Season: 2024–25
- Teams: 10
- Site: Idaho Central Arena; Boise, Idaho
- Champions: Montana (12th title)
- Winning coach: Travis DeCuire (3rd title)
- Television: ESPN+, ESPNU, ESPN2

2024–25 Big Sky men's basketball standings
	Conf.				Overall
Team	W		L	PCT	W		L	PCT
Northern Colorado	15	–	3	.833	25	–	10	.714
Montana †	15	–	3	.833	25	–	10	.714
Portland State	11	–	7	.611	19	–	13	.594
Idaho State	10	–	8	.556	15	–	15	.500
Montana State	9	–	9	.500	15	–	18	.455
Idaho	8	–	10	.444	14	–	19	.424
Northern Arizona	8	–	10	.444	18	–	16	.529
Eastern Washington	6	–	12	.333	10	–	22	.313
Weber State	5	–	13	.278	12	–	22	.353
Sacramento State	3	–	15	.167	7	–	25	.219
† Conference tournament winner

The 2025 Big Sky Conference men's basketball tournament, popularly referred to as "Starch Madness", was the postseason tournament for the Big Sky Conference, held March 8–12 at Idaho Central Arena in Boise, Idaho. It was the 50th edition of the tournament, which debuted in 1976. Second seed Montana won the title and received the Big Sky's automatic bid to the NCAA tournament.

== Seeds ==
The ten teams were seeded by conference record, with a tiebreaker system for identical conference records. The top six teams received a first-round bye.

Seed	School	Record	Tiebreaker
1	Northern Colorado	15–3	2–0 vs. Idaho State
2	Montana	15–3	1–1 vs. Idaho State
3	Portland State	11–7	
4	Idaho State	10–8	
5	Montana State	9–9	
6	Idaho	8–10	1–1 vs. Northern Colorado
7	Northern Arizona	8–10	0–2 vs. Northern Colorado
8	Eastern Washington	6–12	
9	Weber State	5–13	
10	Sacramento State	3–15	

== Schedule ==
Session	Game	Time	Matchup	Score	Television
First round – Saturday, March 8
1	1	5:30 pm	No. 9 Weber State vs. No. 10 Sacramento State	83–70	ESPN+
1	2	8:00 pm	No. 7 Northern Arizona vs. No. 8 Eastern Washington	66–53	ESPN+
Quarterfinals – Sunday, March 9
2	3	5:30 pm	No. 1 Northern Colorado vs. No. 9 Weber State	76–52	ESPN+
2	4	8:00 pm	No. 2 Montana vs. No. 7 Northern Arizona	74–65	ESPN+
Quarterfinals – Monday, March 10
3	5	5:30 pm	No. 4 Idaho State vs. No. 5 Montana State	60–80	ESPN+
3	6	8:00 pm	No. 3 Portland State vs. No. 6 Idaho	70–80	ESPN+
Semifinals – Tuesday, March 11
4	7	7:00 pm	No. 1 Northern Colorado vs. No. 5 Montana State	72–45	ESPNU
4	8	9:30 pm	No. 2 Montana vs. No. 6 Idaho	78–55	ESPN2
Championship game – Wednesday, March 12
5	9	9:30 pm	No. 1 Northern Colorado vs. No. 2 Montana	83–91	ESPN2
Game times in MST for the first round and MDT from the quarterfinals onward. Rankings denote tournament seeding.

== Bracket ==
First round March 8 ESPN+
9	Weber State	83
10	Sacramento State	70
7	Northern Arizona	66
8	Eastern Washington	53

Quarterfinals; March 9 & 10; ESPN+
1	Northern Colorado	76
9	Weber State	52
4	Idaho State	60
5	Montana State	80
2	Montana	74
7	Northern Arizona	65
3	Portland State	70
6	Idaho	80

Semifinals; Tuesday, March 11; ESPNU / ESPN2
1	Northern Colorado	72
5	Montana State	45
2	Montana	78
6	Idaho	55

Championship; Wednesday, March 12; ESPN2
1	Northern Colorado	83
2	Montana	91
