= 2024–25 Eastern Washington Eagles men's basketball team =

American college basketball season

2024–25 Eastern Washington Eagles men's basketball
- Conference: Big Sky Conference
- Record: 10–22 (6–12 Big Sky)
- Head coach: Dan Monson (1st season)
- Associate head coach: Ryan Lundgren
- Assistant coaches: Ben Beauchamp; Larry Anderson; Will Turgeon; MicGuire Monson
- Home arena: Reese Court

2024–25 Big Sky men's basketball standings
	Conf.				Overall
Team	W		L	PCT	W		L	PCT
Northern Colorado	15	–	3	.833	25	–	10	.714
Montana †	15	–	3	.833	25	–	10	.714
Portland State	11	–	7	.611	19	–	13	.594
Idaho State	10	–	8	.556	15	–	15	.500
Montana State	9	–	9	.500	15	–	18	.455
Idaho	8	–	10	.444	14	–	19	.424
Northern Arizona	8	–	10	.444	18	–	16	.529
Eastern Washington	6	–	12	.333	10	–	22	.313
Weber State	5	–	13	.278	12	–	22	.353
Sacramento State	3	–	15	.167	7	–	25	.219
† 2025 Big Sky tournament winner

The 2024–25 Eastern Washington Eagles men's basketball team represented Eastern Washington University during the 2024–25 NCAA Division I men's basketball season. The Eagles, led by first-year head coach Dan Monson, played their home games at Reese Court in Cheney, Washington as members of the Big Sky Conference.

== Previous season ==
The Eagles finished the 2023–24 season 21–11, 15–3 in Big Sky play to win the regular season championship. They were upset by No. 10-seeded Sacramento State in the quarterfinals of the Big Sky tournament.

On April 4, 2024, it was announced that head coach David Riley was leaving the school to take the head coaching position at Washington State. On April 12, the school announced that they had hired former Long Beach State head coach Dan Monson to the same position.

== Offseason ==
=== Departures ===
Departures
Name	Number	Pos.	Height	Weight	Year	Hometown	Notes
Cedric Coward	0	G/F	6'6"	206	Junior	Fresno, California	Transferred to Washington State
LeJuan Watts	4	F	6'6"	233	(redshirt) Freshman	Fresno, California	Transferred to Washington State
Andre Mulibea	5	G	6'5"	220	Junior	West Valley City, Utah	Transferred to Coastal Carolina
Ethan Price	10	F	6'10"	230	Junior	Bury St. Edmunds, England	Transferred to Washington State
Jake Kyman	13	G	6'7"	213	Senior	Aliso Viejo, California	Graduated
Casey Jones	31	G/F	6'6"	220	Junior	Sammamish, Washington	Transferred to Washington State
Dane Erikstrup	32	F	6'11"	226	Junior	Beaverton, Oregon	Transferred to Washington State
Ellis Magnuson	55	G	6'1"	195	Senior	Boise, Idaho	Graduated

=== Incoming transfers ===
Incoming transfers
Name	Number	Pos.	Height	Weight	Year	Hometown	Previous School
Angelo Winkel	0	G	6'8"	220	Junior	Algona, Iowa	Des Moines Area CC
Tyler Powell	1	G	6'5"	190	Junior	Los Angeles, California	Nevada
Elijah Thomas	5	G	6'6"	190	Junior	Surprise, Arizona	Des Moines Area CC
Andrew Cook	9	G	6'4"	205	Senior	Huntington Beach, California	Carroll College
Maddox Monson	10	G	6'2"	180	Junior	Los Alamitos, California	Long Beach State
Pavlo Dziuba	14	F	6'8"	240	Graduate Student	Kyiv, Ukraine	High Point
Sam Stockton	20	G	6'2"	175	(redshirt) Senior	Spokane, Washington	Lewis–Clark State
Shaumba Ngoyi	35	F	6'9"	225	(redshirt) Freshman	Kinshasa, DR Congo	Long Beach State

=== Recruiting class ===
College recruiting information
Name	Hometown	School	Height	Weight	Commit date
Jordy McKenzie; G	Hercules, California	Archbishop Riordan High School	6 ft 3 in (1.91 m)	170 lb (77 kg)	Oct 16, 2023
Jordy McKenzie; G	Recruit ratings: Scout: Rivals: 247Sports: (NR)				
Overall recruit ranking:
Note: In many cases, Scout, Rivals, 247Sports, On3, and ESPN may conflict in their listings of height and weight.; In these cases, the average was taken. ESPN grades are on a 100-point scale.; Sources: "2024 Team Ranking". Rivals.

== Roster ==
2024–25 Eastern Washington Eagles men's basketball team
Players
Coaches

Pos.	#	Name	Height	Weight	Year	Previous school	Hometown
F	0	Angelo Winkel	6 ft 8 in (2.03 m)	220 lb (100 kg)	Jr	Des Moines Area Community College	Algona, Iowa
G	1	Tyler Powell	6 ft 5 in (1.96 m)	210 lb (95 kg)	RS Jr	Nevada	Los Angeles, California
G	2	Mason Williams	6 ft 5 in (1.96 m)	180 lb (82 kg)	So	O'Dea High School	Seattle, Washington
G	4	Jordy McKenzie	6 ft 3 in (1.91 m)	170 lb (77 kg)	Fr	Archbishop Riordan High School	Hercules, California
G	5	Elijah Thomas	6 ft 6 in (1.98 m)	190 lb (86 kg)	Jr	Des Moines Area Community College	Surprise, Arizona
F	8	Vice Zanki	6 ft 8 in (2.03 m)	215 lb (98 kg)	So	KK Cedevita Junior	Zagreb, Croatia
G	9	Andrew Cook	6 ft 4 in (1.93 m)	205 lb (93 kg)	Sr	Carroll College	Huntington Beach, California
G	10	Maddox Monson	6 ft 2 in (1.88 m)	180 lb (82 kg)	Jr	Long Beach State	Los Alamitos, California
G	11	Nic McClain	6 ft 3 in (1.91 m)	200 lb (91 kg)	RS Jr	Daytona State	Jennings, Florida
G	12	Sam Stockton	6 ft 2 in (1.88 m)	175 lb (79 kg)	RS Sr	Lewis–Clark State	Spokane, Washington
F	14	Pavlo Dziuba	6 ft 8 in (2.03 m)	240 lb (109 kg)	GS	High Point	Kyiv, Ukraine
G	21	Sebastian Hartmann	6 ft 6 in (1.98 m)	210 lb (95 kg)	So	MHP Riesen	Munich, Germany
F	22	Jackson Seale	6 ft 10 in (2.08 m)	220 lb (100 kg)	RS Fr	McKinney High School	McKinney, Texas
F	33	Emmett Marquardt	6 ft 9 in (2.06 m)	215 lb (98 kg)	RS Fr	Garfield High School	Seattle, Washington
F	35	Shaumba Ngoyi	6 ft 9 in (2.06 m)	225 lb (102 kg)	RS Fr	Long Beach State	Kinshasa, DR Congo

Head coach

- Dan Monson (Idaho)

Assistant coach(es)

- Ryan Lundgren (Boise State)
- Ben Beauchamp (Western Colorado)
- Larry Anderson (Long Beach State)
- Will Turgeon (Catholic)
- MicGuire Monson (Boise State)

Legend

- (C) Team captain
- (S) Suspended
- (I) Ineligible
- (W) Walk-on
- Injured
- Current redshirt

Roster
Last update: October 10, 2024

== Schedule and results ==
Date time, TV	Rank^{#}	Opponent^{#}	Result	Record	High points	High rebounds	High assists	Site (attendance) city, state
Non-conference regular season
November 4, 2024*; 6:00 pm, ESPN+		at Colorado	L 56–76	0–1	16 – McClain	5 – Tied	4 – Tied	CU Events Center (5,679); Boulder, CO
November 6, 2024*; 6:00 pm, ESPN+		Seattle	W 93–86	1–1	25 – Cook	5 – Marquardt	6 – Hartmann	Reese Court (1,492); Cheney, WA
November 11, 2024*; 4:00 pm, SECN+/ESPN+		at Missouri	L 77–84	1–2	24 – Cook	6 – Tied	5 – Williams	Mizzou Arena (8,912); Columbia, MO
November 17, 2024*; 4:00 pm, ESPN+		Cal Poly	L 78–82	1–3	28 – McClain	8 – Hartmann	5 – McClain	Reese Court (1,630); Cheney, WA
November 21, 2024*; 6:30 pm		vs. Washington State	L 81–96	1–4	24 – McClain	7 – McClain	3 – McClain	Spokane Arena (3,854); Spokane, WA
November 23, 2024*; 5:00 pm, ESPN+		at California Baptist	L 68–79	1–5	24 – McClain	7 – Tied	6 – McClain	Fowler Events Center (2,064); Riverside, CA
November 26, 2024*; 7:00 pm, ESPN+		at UC Santa Barbara	L 51–67	1–6	14 – Tied	10 – Marquardt	4 – McClain	The Thunderdome (1,541); Santa Barbara, CA
November 30, 2024*; 2:00 pm, ESPN+		at Utah	L 80–88	1–7	23 – Cook	7 – Marquardt	5 – McClain	Jon M. Huntsman Center (7,064); Salt Lake City, UT
December 4, 2024*; 6:00 pm, ESPN+		North Dakota; Big Sky-Summit League Challenge	W 87–81	2–7	20 – Cook	8 – Zanki	5 – McClain	Reese Court (1,400); Cheney, WA
December 7, 2024*; 4:00 pm		at South Dakota State; Big Sky-Summit League Challenge	L 53–74	2–8	13 – Cook	6 – Cook	3 – Cook	First Bank and Trust Arena (2,768); Brookings, SD
December 10, 2024*; 8:00 pm, BTN		at Washington	L 69–87	2–9	18 – Cook	9 – Marquardt	5 – McClain	Alaska Airlines Arena (5,655); Seattle, WA
December 21, 2024*; 2:00 pm, ESPN+		Lincoln	W 107–63	3–9	20 – Hartmann	9 – Marquardt	5 – Tied	Reese Court (1,277); Cheney, WA
December 30, 2024*; 6:00 pm, ESPN+		Eastern Oregon	W 89–63	4–9	17 – Marquardt	7 – Marquardt	5 – Cook	Reese Court (1,405); Cheney, WA
Big Sky regular season
January 2, 2025; 6:00 pm, ESPN+		Montana	L 81–92	4–10 (0–1)	28 – Williams	7 – Tied	6 – McClain	Reese Court (1,630); Cheney, WA
January 4, 2025; 2:00 pm, ESPN+		Montana State	W 68–63	5–10 (1–1)	16 – McClain	6 – Marquardt	4 – McClain	Reese Court (1,624); Cheney, WA
January 9, 2025; 7:00 pm, ESPN+		at Portland State	L 59–64	5–11 (1–2)	12 – Tied	7 – Zanki	3 – Tied	Viking Pavilion (970); Portland, OR
January 11, 2025; 1:00 pm, ESPN+		at Sacramento State	W 65–54	6–11 (2–2)	16 – Marquardt	6 – McClain	5 – Hartmann	Hornets Nest (478); Sacramento, CA
January 18, 2025; 4:00 pm, ESPN+		at Idaho	L 76–83	6–12 (2–3)	21 – Williams	7 – Tied	5 – McClain	ICCU Arena (2,485); Moscow, ID
January 20, 2025; 6:00 pm, ESPN+		at Montana State	L 64–74	6–13 (2–4)	21 – Cook	6 – Tied	3 – Tied	Worthington Arena (3,111); Bozeman, MT
January 23, 2025; 6:00 pm, ESPN+		Northern Arizona	L 61–70	6–14 (2–5)	18 – Williams	5 – Tied	5 – McClain	Reese Court (1,249); Cheney, WA
January 25, 2025; 2:00 pm, ESPN+		Northern Colorado	L 62–67	6–15 (2–6)	16 – McClain	8 – Williams	5 – Stockton	Reese Court (1,600); Cheney, WA
January 30, 2025; 6:00 pm, ESPN+		at Idaho State	L 70–78	6–16 (2–7)	35 – Williams	6 – Hartmann	2 – Tied	Reed Gym (1,242); Pocatello, ID
February 1, 2025; 12:30 pm, ESPN+		at Weber State	W 72–49	7–16 (3–7)	27 – Cook	10 – Marquardt	3 – Williams	Dee Events Center (2,428); Ogden, UT
February 6, 2025; 6:00 pm, ESPN+		Sacramento State	W 83–80	8–16 (4–7)	29 – Williams	4 – Tied	6 – Williams	Reese Court (1,197); Cheney, WA
February 8, 2025; 2:00 pm, ESPN+		Portland State	W 72–67	9–16 (5–7)	17 – Tied	6 – Williams	3 – Hartmann	Reese Court (1,351); Cheney, WA
February 15, 2025; 4:00 pm, ESPN+		Idaho	W 75–73	10–16 (6–7)	28 – Cook	4 – Tied	8 – Williams	Reese Court (1,989); Cheney, WA
February 20, 2025; 5:00 pm, ESPN+		at Northern Colorado	L 76–95	10–17 (6–8)	21 – Cook	3 – Tied	3 – Stockton	Bank of Colorado Arena (1,356); Greeley, CO
February 22, 2025; 1:00 pm, ESPN+		at Northern Arizona	L 67–87	10–18 (6–9)	14 – Cook	4 – Williams	5 – McClain	Findlay Toyota Court (804); Flagstaff, AZ
February 27, 2025; 6:00 pm, ESPN+		Weber State	L 64–66	10–19 (6–10)	16 – Hartmann	8 – Hartmann	6 – McClain	Reese Court (1,354); Cheney, WA
March 1, 2025; 2:00 pm, ESPN+		Idaho State	L 54–78	10–20 (6–11)	24 – Cook	4 – Tied	8 – McClain	Reese Court (1,965); Cheney, WA
March 3, 2025; 8:00 pm, ESPN2		at Montana	L 72–83	10–21 (6–12)	20 – Williams	4 – Tied	5 – McClain	Dahlberg Arena (3,955); Missoula, MT
Big Sky tournament
March 8, 2025; 7:00 pm, ESPN+	(8)	vs. (7) Northern Arizona; First round	L 53–66	10–22	20 – Williams	6 – Tied	4 – Cook	Idaho Central Arena; Boise, ID
*Non-conference game. ^{#}Rankings from AP Poll. (#) Tournament seedings in parentheses. All times are in Pacific.
