= 2024–25 Montana Grizzlies basketball team =

American college basketball season

2024–25 Montana Grizzlies basketball

Big Sky regular season co-champions Big Sky tournament champions

NCAA tournament, First Round
- Conference: Big Sky Conference
- Record: 25–10 (15–3 Big Sky)
- Head coach: Travis DeCuire (11th season)
- Associate head coach: Chris Cobb
- Assistant coaches: Jay Flores; Anderson Clarke; DJ Broome; Reuben Williams
- Home arena: Dahlberg Arena

2024–25 Big Sky men's basketball standings
	Conf.				Overall
Team	W		L	PCT	W		L	PCT
Northern Colorado	15	–	3	.833	25	–	10	.714
Montana †	15	–	3	.833	25	–	10	.714
Portland State	11	–	7	.611	19	–	13	.594
Idaho State	10	–	8	.556	15	–	15	.500
Montana State	9	–	9	.500	15	–	18	.455
Idaho	8	–	10	.444	14	–	19	.424
Northern Arizona	8	–	10	.444	18	–	16	.529
Eastern Washington	6	–	12	.333	10	–	22	.313
Weber State	5	–	13	.278	12	–	22	.353
Sacramento State	3	–	15	.167	7	–	25	.219
† 2025 Big Sky tournament winner

The 2024–25 Montana Grizzlies basketball team represented the University of Montana during the 2024–25 NCAA Division I men's basketball season. The Grizzlies, led by 11th-year head coach Travis DeCuire, played their home games at Dahlberg Arena in Missoula, Montana as members of the Big Sky Conference.

== Previous season ==
The Grizzlies finished the 2023–24 season 24–12, 12–6 in Big Sky play to finish in a tie for second place. They defeated Portland State and Idaho State, before falling to Montana State in the Big Sky tournament championship game. They received an invitation to the CBI, receiving the #5 seed, where they defeat Presbyterian in the first round, before falling to Arkansas State in the quarterfinals.

== Offseason ==
=== Departures ===
Departures
Name	Number	Pos.	Height	Weight	Year	Hometown	Notes
Josh Vazquez	3	G	6'3"	180	Graduate Student	Torrance, California	Graduated
Giordan Williams	4	G	6'5"	183	(redshirt) Senior	Carson, California	Transferred to Cal State San Bernardino
Jaxon Nap	5	F	6'7"	208	Sophomore	Renton, Washington	Transferred to Seattle Pacific
Aanen Moody	11	G	6'3"	186	Graduate Student	Dickinson, North Dakota	Graduated
Rhett Reynolds	13	F	6'9"	210	(redshirt) Freshman	Shelby, Montana	Transferred to Montana Tech
Laolu Oke	21	F	6'8"	215	(redshirt) Senior	Aurora, Colorado	Graduated
Dischon Thomas	24	F	6'9"	230	(redshirt) Senior	Durham, North Carolina	Graduated
Caden Bateman	30	F	6'7"	204	(redshirt) Freshman	Missoula, Montana	Transferred to Whitworth
Blake Jones	34	F	6'10"	225	Junior	Canberra, Australia	Transferred to Cal State Monterey Bay

=== Incoming transfers ===
Incoming transfers
Name	Number	Pos.	Height	Weight	Year	Hometown	Previous School
Kai Johnson	1	G	6'4"	190	Senior	Olympia, Washington	Western Washington
Malik Moore	3	G	6'5"	190	Junior	Ventura, California	Pepperdine
Amari Jedkins	5	F	6'7"	195	(redshirt) Sophomore	Racine, Wisconsin	Green Bay
Jeremiah Dargan	8	G	6'4"	190	Junior	Concord, California	West Valley College
Joe Pridgen	11	G	6'5"	210	Graduate Student	Winchendon, Massachusetts	Northeastern
Jalen Foy	15	F	6'7"	215	Junior	Las Vegas, Nevada	Northeastern Junior College
Austin Patterson	20	G	6'3"	185	Senior	Sonora, California	Sacramento State
Jensen Bradtke	50	F	6'10"	220	(redshirt) Freshman	Sandringham, Australia	Saint Mary's

=== Recruiting class ===
College recruiting information
Name	Hometown	School	Height	Weight	Commit date
Tyler Thompson; G	Fairfield, California	Vanden High School	6 ft 6 in (1.98 m)	190 lb (86 kg)	Sep 4, 2023
Tyler Thompson; G	Recruit ratings: Scout: Rivals: 247Sports: (NR)				
Overall recruit ranking:
Note: In many cases, Scout, Rivals, 247Sports, On3, and ESPN may conflict in their listings of height and weight.; In these cases, the average was taken. ESPN grades are on a 100-point scale.; Sources: "2024 Team Ranking". Rivals.

== Roster ==
2024–25 Montana Grizzlies men's basketball team
Players
Coaches

Pos.	#	Name	Height	Weight	Year	Previous school	Hometown
G	0	Money Williams	6 ft 4 in (1.93 m)	200 lb (91 kg)	So	Oakland High School	Oakland, California
G	1	Kai Johnson	6 ft 4 in (1.93 m)	190 lb (86 kg)	Sr	Western Washington	Olympia, Washington
G	2	Chase Henderson	6 ft 0 in (1.83 m)	165 lb (75 kg)	So	Hoover High School	Des Moines, Iowa
G	3	Malik Moore	6 ft 5 in (1.96 m)	190 lb (86 kg)	Jr	Pepperdine	Ventura, California
G	4	Tyler Thompson	6 ft 6 in (1.98 m)	190 lb (86 kg)	Fr	Vanden High School	Fairfield, California
F	5	Amari Jedkins	6 ft 7 in (2.01 m)	195 lb (88 kg)	RS So	Green Bay	Racine, Wisconsin
G	11	Joe Pridgen	6 ft 5 in (1.96 m)	210 lb (95 kg)	GS	Northeastern	Winchendon, Massachusetts
G	12	Brandon Whitney	6 ft 1 in (1.85 m)	183 lb (83 kg)	GS	Bishop Alemany High School	Mission Hills, California
F	14	Zack Davidson	6 ft 8 in (2.03 m)	224 lb (102 kg)	RS Fr	Mater Dei High School	Santa Ana, California
F	15	Jalen Foy	6 ft 7 in (2.01 m)	215 lb (98 kg)	Jr	Northeastern Junior College	Las Vegas, Nevada
G	20	Austin Patterson	6 ft 3 in (1.91 m)	185 lb (84 kg)	Sr	Sacramento State	Sonora, California
G	22	Adam Shoff	6 ft 1 in (1.85 m)	167 lb (76 kg)	GS	Shasta College	Redding, California
G	23	Connor Dick	6 ft 3 in (1.91 m)	194 lb (88 kg)	So	Hellgate High School	Missoula, Montana
G	24	Jeremiah Dargan	6 ft 4 in (1.93 m)	190 lb (86 kg)	Jr	West Valley College	Concord, California
F	32	Te'Jon Sawyer	6 ft 8 in (2.03 m)	252 lb (114 kg)	Sr	City College of San Francisco	San Francisco, California
F	50	Jensen Bradtke	6 ft 10 in (2.08 m)	220 lb (100 kg)	RS Fr	Saint Mary's	Sandringham, Victoria

Head coach

- Travis DeCuire (Montana)

Assistant coach(es)

- Chris Cobb (Menlo)
- Jay Flores (Chico State)
- Anderson Clarke (Concordia–Irvine)
- DJ Broome (Humboldt State)
- Reuben Williams (Willamette)

Legend

- (C) Team captain
- (S) Suspended
- (I) Ineligible
- (W) Walk-on
- Injured
- Current redshirt

Roster
Last update: October 14, 2024

== Schedule and results ==
Date time, TV	Rank^{#}	Opponent^{#}	Result	Record	High points	High rebounds	High assists	Site (attendance) city, state
Exhibition
October 22, 2024*; 6:00 pm		Saint Martin's	W 82–54		–	–	–	Dahlberg Arena; Missoula, MT
Non-conference regular season
November 4, 2024*; 7:00 pm, ESPN+		Hawaii–Hilo	W 92–61	1–0	27 – Johnson	8 – Pridgen	5 – Williams	Dahlberg Arena (2,142); Missoula, MT
November 8, 2024*; 8:00 pm, BTN		at Oregon	L 48–79	1–1	14 – Pridgen	9 – Pridgen	2 – Johnson	Matthew Knight Arena (6,577); Eugene, OR
November 10, 2024*; 8:00 pm, ESPN+		Northwest Indian	W 94–44	2–1	22 – Johnson	10 – Davidson	7 – Williams	Dahlberg Arena (2,117); Missoula, MT
November 13, 2024*; 5:00 pm, SECN+/ESPN+		at No. 11 Tennessee	L 57–92	2–2	30 – Williams	5 – Pridgen	2 – Tied	Thompson–Boling Arena (16,916); Knoxville, TN
November 18, 2024*; 7:00 pm, MW Network		at Utah State	L 83–95	2–3	25 – Williams	8 – Pridgen	5 – Whitney	Smith Spectrum (8,054); Logan, UT
November 24, 2024*; 5:00 pm, ESPN+		Denver; Stew Morrill Classic	W 83–73	3–3	23 – Pridgen	7 – Pridgen	3 – Tied	Dahlberg Arena (2,456); Missoula, MT
November 25, 2024*; 5:45 pm, ESPN+		Utah Tech; Stew Morrill Classic	W 69–66	4–3	16 – Tied	6 – Pridgen	2 – Tied	Dahlberg Arena (2,267); Missoula, MT
November 27, 2024*; 7:00 pm, ESPN+		Cal State Northridge; Stew Morrill Classic	W 83–75	5–3	22 – Moore	13 – Pridgen	4 – Moore	Dahlberg Arena (2,284); Missoula, MT
December 4, 2024*; 7:00 pm, ESPN+		South Dakota State; Big Sky-Summit Challenge	W 71–67	6–3	16 – Moore	8 – Pridgen	4 – Williams	Dahlberg Arena (2,534); Missoula, MT
December 7, 2024*; 1:00 pm		at St. Thomas; Big Sky-Summit Challenge	L 81–88	6–4	30 – Moore	6 – Williams	8 – Whitney	Schoenecker Arena (1,213); St. Paul, MN
December 10, 2024*; 7:00 pm, ESPN+		Montana Tech	W 89–60	7–4	21 – Pridgen	13 – Pridgen	7 – Moore	Dahlberg Arena (2,709); Missoula, MT
December 16, 2024*; 6:00 pm, ESPN+		at Northern Iowa	L 76–104	7–5	18 – Johnson	4 – Foy	4 – Whitney	McLeod Center (3,045); Cedar Falls, IA
December 21, 2024*; 4:00 pm, ESPN+		at San Francisco	L 67–71	7–6	21 – Pridgen	10 – Pridgen	4 – Moore	Sobrato Center (2,238); San Francisco, CA
Big Sky regular season
January 2, 2025; 7:00 pm, ESPN+		at Eastern Washington	W 92–81	8–6 (1–0)	26 – Williams	5 – Johnson	8 – Whitney	Reese Court (1,630); Cheney, WA
January 4, 2025; 3:00 pm, ESPN+		at Idaho	W 73–71	9–6 (2–0)	18 – Tied	10 – Pridgen	4 – Moore	ICCU Arena (1,816); Moscow, ID
January 9, 2025; 7:00 pm, ESPN+		Northern Arizona	W 81–76	10–6 (3–0)	20 – Moore	8 – Sawyer	5 – Moore	Dahlberg Arena (2,572); Missoula, MT
January 11, 2025; 4:00 pm, ESPN+		Northern Colorado	L 57–81	10–7 (3–1)	15 – Williams	6 – Sawyer	4 – Whitney	Dahlberg Arena (3,184); Missoula, MT
January 16, 2025; 7:00 pm, ESPN+		at Weber State	W 63–59	11–7 (4–1)	18 – Moore	10 – Pridgen	3 – Williams	Dee Events Center (3,336); Ogden, UT
January 18, 2025; 7:00 pm, ESPN+		at Idaho State	L 61–86	11–8 (4–2)	12 – Moore	9 – Pridgen	5 – Williams	Reed Gym (1,530); Pocatello, ID
January 20, 2025; 7:00 pm, ESPN+		Idaho	W 72–67	12–8 (5–2)	18 – Whitney	10 – Pridgen	9 – Williams	Dahlberg Arena (2,438); Missoula, MT
January 25, 2025; 7:00 pm, ESPN+		Montana State	W 77–70	13–8 (6–2)	25 – Johnson	6 – Pridgen	3 – Tied	Dahlberg Arena (5,766); Missoula, MT
January 30, 2025; 7:00 pm, ESPN+		Portland State	W 92–78	14–8 (7–2)	19 – Whitney	8 – Williams	6 – Williams	Dahlberg Arena (2,754); Missoula, MT
February 1, 2025; 4:00 pm, ESPN+		Sacramento State	W 87–59	15–8 (8–2)	15 – Johnson	6 – Moore	6 – Moore	Dahlberg Arena (3,344); Missoula, MT
February 6, 2025; 6:00 pm, ESPN+		at Northern Colorado	W 86–78	16–8 (9–2)	19 – Williams	8 – Williams	3 – Tied	Bank of Colorado Arena (2,001); Greeley, CO
February 8, 2025; 6:00 pm, ESPN+		at Northern Arizona	W 83–80	17–8 (10–2)	22 – Johnson	5 – Johnson	7 – Johnson	Findlay Toyota Court (1,212); Flagstaff, AZ
February 13, 2025; 7:00 pm, ESPN+		Idaho State	W 81–68	18–8 (11–2)	17 – Williams	6 – Tied	3 – Tied	Dahlberg Arena (2,804); Missoula, MT
February 15, 2025; 7:00 pm, ESPN+		Weber State	W 65–58	19–8 (12–2)	22 – Moore	5 – Pridgen	4 – Tied	Dahlberg Arena (3,318); Missoula, MT
February 22, 2025; 7:00 pm, ESPN+		at Montana State	W 89–85	20–8 (13–2)	23 – Johnson	5 – Tied	3 – Sawyer	Worthington Arena (5,580); Bozeman, MT
February 27, 2025; 8:00 pm, ESPN+		at Sacramento State	W 60–54	21–8 (14–2)	18 – Whitney	9 – Williams	4 – Whitney	Hornets Nest (1,023); Sacramento, CA
March 1, 2025; 3:00 pm, ESPN+		at Portland State	L 76–79 ^{OT}	21–9 (14–3)	36 – Williams	8 – Pridgen	3 – Tied	Viking Pavilion (1,427); Portland, OR
March 3, 2025; 9:00 pm, ESPN2		Eastern Washington	W 83–72	22–9 (15–3)	23 – Williams	11 – Pridgen	3 – Whitney	Dahlberg Arena (3,955); Missoula, MT
Big Sky tournament
March 9, 2025; 8:00 pm, ESPN+	(2)	vs. (7) Northern Arizona; Quarterfinals	W 74–65	23–9	24 – Whitney	8 – Sawyer	3 – Williams	Idaho Central Arena; Boise, ID
March 11, 2025; 9:30 pm, ESPN2	(2)	vs. (6) Idaho; Semifinals	W 78–55	24–9	20 – Patterson	7 – Pridgen	5 – Williams	Idaho Central Arena; Boise, ID
March 12, 2025; 9:30 pm, ESPN2	(2)	vs. (1) Northern Colorado; Championship	W 91–83	25–9	23 – Johnson	6 – Patterson	3 – Whitney	Idaho Central Arena; Boise, ID
NCAA tournament
March 20, 2025*; 11:30 a.m., TNT	(14 E)	vs. (3 E) No. 13 Wisconsin; First Round	L 66–85	25–10	15 – Tied	8 – Sawyer	4 – Williams	Ball Arena; Denver, CO
*Non-conference game. ^{#}Rankings from AP Poll. (#) Tournament seedings in parentheses. E=East. All times are in Mountain.
