= 2024–25 Portland State Vikings men's basketball team =

American college basketball season

2024–25 Portland State Vikings men's basketball
- Conference: Big Sky Conference
- Record: 19–13 (11–7 Big Sky)
- Head coach: Jase Coburn (4th season)
- Associate head coach: Matt Dunn
- Assistant coaches: Nate Laing; Mike Harmon; Alberto De La Torre
- Home arena: Viking Pavilion

2024–25 Big Sky men's basketball standings
	Conf.				Overall
Team	W		L	PCT	W		L	PCT
Northern Colorado	15	–	3	.833	25	–	10	.714
Montana †	15	–	3	.833	25	–	10	.714
Portland State	11	–	7	.611	19	–	13	.594
Idaho State	10	–	8	.556	15	–	15	.500
Montana State	9	–	9	.500	15	–	18	.455
Idaho	8	–	10	.444	14	–	19	.424
Northern Arizona	8	–	10	.444	18	–	16	.529
Eastern Washington	6	–	12	.333	10	–	22	.313
Weber State	5	–	13	.278	12	–	22	.353
Sacramento State	3	–	15	.167	7	–	25	.219
† 2025 Big Sky tournament winner

The 2024–25 Portland State Vikings men's basketball team represented Portland State University during the 2024–25 NCAA Division I men's basketball season. The Vikings, led by fourth-year head coach Jase Coburn, played their home games at the Viking Pavilion in Portland, Oregon as members of the Big Sky Conference.

== Previous season ==
The Vikings finished the 2023–24 season 17–15, 8–10 in Big Sky play to finish in sixth place. They were defeated by Montana in the quarterfinals of the Big Sky tournament.

== Offseason ==
=== Departures ===
Departures
Name	Number	Pos.	Height	Weight	Year	Hometown	Notes
Bobby Harvey	2	G	6'4"	205	Senior	Chicago, Illinois	Graduated
KJ Allen	3	F	6'6"	255	Junior	Los Angeles, California	Graduated
Isiah Kirby	5	G	6'4"	205	Senior	Fort Lauderdale, Florida	Graduated
Jorell Saterfield	23	G	6'5"	190	Senior	Chicago, Illinois	Graduated
Hunter Woods	25	F	6'6"	200	Senior	Pasadena, California	Graduated
Kendall Munson	44	F	6'8"	235	Junior	Seattle, Washington	Transferred to Jacksonville
Keshaun Saunders	55	F	6'5"	195	Senior	Brampton, Ontario	Graduated

=== Incoming transfers ===
Incoming transfers
Name	Number	Pos.	Height	Weight	Year	Hometown	Previous School
Qiant Myers	2	G	6'5"	170	Senior	Fresno, California	Western Oregon
Shane Nowell	3	G	6'6"	225	Senior	Seattle, Washington	UNLV
Jaylin Henderson	5	G	6'3"	175	Senior	Wichita, Kansas	Louisiana Tech
Sebastian Tidor	6	G	6'5"	195	Junior	Dallas, Georgia	Roane State CC
Isaac Brice	9	F	6'6"	210	Junior	Picayune, Mississippi	Iona
Terri Miller Jr.	34	F	6'8"	250	Senior	Fresno, California	Louisiana Tech

=== Recruiting class ===
College recruiting information
Name	Hometown	School	Height	Weight	Commit date
Tait Spencer; G	Battle Ground, Washington	Great Futures Prep	6 ft 3 in (1.91 m)	195 lb (88 kg)	Jun 16, 2024
Tait Spencer; G	Recruit ratings: Scout: Rivals: 247Sports: (NR)				
Alex Dupre; G	Los Angeles, California	Birmingham High School	6 ft 5 in (1.96 m)	180 lb (82 kg)	Sep 27, 2024
Alex Dupre; G	Recruit ratings: Scout: Rivals: 247Sports: (NR)				
Overall recruit ranking:
Note: In many cases, Scout, Rivals, 247Sports, On3, and ESPN may conflict in their listings of height and weight.; In these cases, the average was taken. ESPN grades are on a 100-point scale.; Sources: "2024 Team Ranking". Rivals.

== Roster ==
2024–25 Portland State Vikings men's basketball team
Players
Coaches

Pos.	#	Name	Height	Weight	Year	Previous school	Hometown
G	0	Cole Farrell	6 ft 5 in (1.96 m)	205 lb (93 kg)	So	TLAP Sports Academy	St. Louis, Missouri
G	1	Kelcy Phipps	6 ft 2 in (1.88 m)	175 lb (79 kg)	RS Fr	Bishop Montgomery High School	Carson, California
G	2	Qiant Myers	6 ft 5 in (1.96 m)	170 lb (77 kg)	Sr	Western Oregon	Fresno, California
G	3	Shane Nowell	6 ft 6 in (1.98 m)	220 lb (100 kg)	Sr	UNLV	Seattle, Washington
C	4	Tre-Vaughn Minott	6 ft 9 in (2.06 m)	260 lb (118 kg)	Sr	South Carolina	Montreal, Quebec
G	5	Jaylin Henderson	6 ft 3 in (1.91 m)	175 lb (79 kg)	Sr	Louisiana Tech	Wichita, Kansas
G	6	Sebastian Tidor	6 ft 5 in (1.96 m)	185 lb (84 kg)	Jr	Roane State Community College	Dallas, Georgia
F	9	Isaac Brice	6 ft 6 in (1.98 m)	205 lb (93 kg)	Jr	Iona	Picayune, Mississippi
C	10	Hayden Curtiss	6 ft 11 in (2.11 m)	220 lb (100 kg)	Sr	Portland	North Bend, Washington
G	12	Tait Spencer	6 ft 3 in (1.91 m)	195 lb (88 kg)	Fr	Great Futures Prep	Battle Ground, Washington
G	15	Alex Dupre	6 ft 5 in (1.96 m)	180 lb (82 kg)	Fr	Birmingham High School	Los Angeles, California
F	22	Isaiah Johnson	6 ft 6 in (1.98 m)	225 lb (102 kg)	Sr	Oregon State	Torrance, California
G	24	Ismail Habib	6 ft 0 in (1.83 m)	175 lb (79 kg)	Jr	South Plains College	Chicago, Illinois
F	34	Terri Miller Jr.	6 ft 8 in (2.03 m)	250 lb (113 kg)	Sr	Louisiana Tech	Fresno, California

Head coach

- Jase Coburn (Arizona State)

Assistant coach(es)

- Matt Dunn (Fort Hays State)
- Nate Laing (Jacksonville State)
- Mike Harmon (Northeastern State)
- Alberto De La Torre (Portland State)

Legend

- (C) Team captain
- (S) Suspended
- (I) Ineligible
- (W) Walk-on
- Injured
- Current redshirt

Roster
Last update: October 16, 2024

== Schedule and results ==
Date time, TV	Rank^{#}	Opponent^{#}	Result	Record	High points	High rebounds	High assists	Site (attendance) city, state
Non-conference regular season
November 4, 2024*; 8:00 pm, ESPN+		at Washington State	L 92–100	0–1	20 – Miller Jr.	7 – Johnson	10 – Myers	Beasley Coliseum (3,120); Pullman, WA
November 7, 2024*; 7:00 pm, ESPN+		Evergreen State	W 131–84	1–1	29 – Habib	6 – Tied	14 – Myers	Viking Pavilion (429); Portland, OR
November 12, 2024*; 7:00 pm, ESPN+		at San Diego	W 85–76	2–1	23 – Henderson	7 – Johnson	5 – Myers	Jenny Craig Pavilion (507); San Diego, CA
November 22, 2024*; 5:00 pm, ESPN+		at Milwaukee; Cream City Challenge	L 74–91	2–2	14 – Nowell	5 – Tied	3 – Myers	UWM Panther Arena (1,638); Milwaukee, WI
November 23, 2024*; 10:00 am		vs. St. Thomas; Cream City Challenge	L 65–91	2–3	12 – Farrell	7 – Tied	2 – Tied	UWM Panther Arena; Milwaukee, WI
November 24, 2024*; 9:00 am		vs. Wofford; Cream City Challenge	W 79–74	3–3	21 – Johnson	9 – Johnson	6 – Myers	UWM Panther Arena (1,011); Milwaukee, WI
November 30, 2024*; 5:00 pm, ESPN+		Utah Tech	W 71–68	4–3	22 – Henderson	11 – Minott	5 – Myers	Viking Pavilion (570); Portland, OR
December 4, 2024*; 7:00 pm, ESPN+		at Seattle	L 74–91	4–4	15 – Myers	6 – Johnson	6 – Myers	Climate Pledge Arena (1,194); Seattle, WA
December 7, 2024*; 2:00 pm, ESPN+		Denver; Big Sky-Summit Challenge	L 67–68	4–5	16 – Henderson	8 – Minott	10 – Myers	Viking Pavilion (652); Portland, OR
December 14, 2024*; 2:00 pm, ESPN+		Northwest Indian	W 110–48	5–5	17 – Nowell	10 – Tied	10 – Miller Jr.	Viking Pavilion (363); Portland, OR
December 18, 2024*; 7:00 pm, ESPN+		at Pacific	W 81–75	6–5	18 – Farrell	11 – Johnson	11 – Myers	Alex G. Spanos Center (1,074); Stockton, CA
December 21, 2024*; 6:30 pm, ESPN+		at Cal State Bakersfield	W 59–58	7–5	14 – Johnson	6 – Johnson	2 – Tied	Icardo Center (732); Bakersfield, CA
December 31, 2024*; 2:00 pm, ESPN+		Walla Walla	W 96–39	8–5	24 – Henderson	9 – Curtiss	7 – Myers	Viking Pavilion; Portland, OR
Big Sky regular season
January 4, 2025; 1:00 pm, ESPN+		at Sacramento State	L 53–56	8–6 (0–1)	13 – Johnson	5 – Tied	7 – Myers	Hornets Nest (397); Sacramento, CA
January 9, 2025; 7:00 pm, ESPN+		Eastern Washington	W 64–59	9–6 (1–1)	16 – Miller Jr.	10 – Minott	4 – Myers	Viking Pavilion (970); Portland, OR
January 11, 2025; 2:00 pm, ESPN+		Idaho	W 75–63	10–6 (2–1)	17 – Miller Jr.	8 – Tied	7 – Myers	Viking Pavilion (835); Portland, OR
January 16, 2025; 5:00 pm, ESPN+		at Northern Colorado	L 69–72	10–7 (2–2)	19 – Myers	11 – Minott	7 – Myers	Bank of Colorado Arena (1,208); Greeley, CO
January 18, 2025; 5:00 pm, ESPN+		at Northern Arizona	W 80–69	11–7 (3–2)	14 – Myers	6 – Johnson	11 – Myers	Findlay Toyota Court (1,172); Flagstaff, AZ
January 23, 2025; 7:00 pm, ESPN+		Weber State	W 74–56	12–7 (4–2)	14 – Tied	11 – Minott	5 – Tied	Viking Pavilion (1,025); Portland, OR
January 25, 2025; 2:00 pm, ESPN+		Idaho State	W 76–59	13–7 (5–2)	31 – Henderson	11 – Miller Jr.	8 – Myers	Viking Pavilion (696); Portland, OR
January 30, 2025; 6:00 pm, ESPN+		at Montana	L 78–92	13–8 (5–3)	28 – Myers	7 – Minott	4 – Myers	Dahlberg Arena (2,754); Missoula, MT
February 1, 2025; 5:00 pm, ESPN+		at Montana State	L 73–74	13–9 (5–4)	25 – Miller Jr.	11 – Minott	4 – Myers	Worthington Arena (3,846); Bozeman, MT
February 6, 2025; 6:00 pm, ESPN+		at Idaho	W 76–69	14–9 (6–4)	22 – Johnson	9 – Minott	6 – Myers	ICCU Arena (1,676); Moscow, ID
February 8, 2025; 2:00 pm, ESPN+		at Eastern Washington	L 67–72	14–10 (6–5)	19 – Henderson	13 – Minott	2 – Tied	Reese Court (1,351); Cheney, WA
February 13, 2025; 7:00 pm, ESPN+		Northern Arizona	W 58–46	15–10 (7–5)	15 – Miller Jr.	15 – Minott	5 – Myers	Viking Pavilion (200); Portland, OR
February 15, 2025; 2:00 pm, ESPN+		Northern Colorado	W 82–71	16–10 (8–5)	21 – Henderson	10 – Minott	7 – Henderson	Viking Pavilion (777); Portland, OR
February 20, 2025; 6:00 pm, ESPN+		at Idaho State	L 74–82	16–11 (8–6)	28 – Miller Jr.	8 – Minott	3 – Tied	Reed Gym (1,282); Pocatello, ID
February 22, 2025; 1:00 pm, ESPN+		at Weber State	L 58–60	16–12 (8–7)	14 – Tied	11 – Miller Jr.	5 – Myers	Dee Events Center (2,144); Ogden, UT
February 27, 2025; 7:00 pm, ESPN+		Montana State	W 69–52	17–12 (9–7)	16 – Johnson	17 – Minott	6 – Myers	Viking Pavilion (986); Portland, OR
March 1, 2025; 2:00 pm, ESPN+		Montana	W 79–76 ^{OT}	18–12 (10–7)	21 – Miller Jr.	11 – Miller Jr.	5 – Myers	Viking Pavilion (1,427); Portland, OR
March 3, 2025; 7:00 pm, ESPN+		Sacramento State	W 59–56	19–12 (11–7)	21 – Johnson	9 – Johnson	7 – Myers	Viking Pavilion (1,167); Portland, OR
Big Sky tournament
March 10, 2025; 7:00 pm, ESPN+	(3)	vs. (6) Idaho; Quarterfinals	L 70–80	19–13	17 – Miller Jr.	13 – Miller Jr.	6 – Myers	Idaho Central Arena (1,775); Boise, ID
*Non-conference game. ^{#}Rankings from AP Poll. (#) Tournament seedings in parentheses. All times are in Pacific.
