= 2024–25 Northern Arizona Lumberjacks men's basketball team =

American college basketball season

2024–2025 Northern Arizona Lumberjacks men's basketball

CBI, First Round
- Conference: Big Sky Conference
- Record: 18–16 (8–10 Big Sky)
- Head coach: Shane Burcar (6th season)
- Associate head coach: Gary Bell Jr.
- Assistant coaches: Tim Russo; Jack Mitchell
- Home arena: Rolle Activity Center; Findlay Toyota Court

2024–25 Big Sky men's basketball standings
	Conf.				Overall
Team	W		L	PCT	W		L	PCT
Northern Colorado	15	–	3	.833	25	–	10	.714
Montana †	15	–	3	.833	25	–	10	.714
Portland State	11	–	7	.611	19	–	13	.594
Idaho State	10	–	8	.556	15	–	15	.500
Montana State	9	–	9	.500	15	–	18	.455
Idaho	8	–	10	.444	14	–	19	.424
Northern Arizona	8	–	10	.444	18	–	16	.529
Eastern Washington	6	–	12	.333	10	–	22	.313
Weber State	5	–	13	.278	12	–	22	.353
Sacramento State	3	–	15	.167	7	–	25	.219
† Conference tournament winner

The 2024–25 Northern Arizona Lumberjacks men's basketball team represented Northern Arizona University during the 2024–25 NCAA Division I men's basketball season. The Lumberjacks, led by sixth-year head coach Shane Burcar, played their home games at the Rolle Activity Center and Findlay Toyota Court, both located in Flagstaff, Arizona as members of the Big Sky Conference.

== Previous season ==
The Lumberjacks finished the 2023–24 season 14–19, 7–11 in Big Sky play to finish in a tie for seventh place. They were defeated by Idaho State in the first round of the Big Sky tournament.

== Offseason ==
=== Departures ===
Departures
Name	Number	Pos.	Height	Weight	Year	Hometown	Notes
Tichyque Musaka	6	F	6'11"	200	Freshman	Durham, North Carolina	Transferred to Gulf Coast State College
Carson Basham	7	F	6'10"	240	Junior	Phoenix, Arizona	Ruled Academically Ineligible; Not on Roster
Rockwell Reynolds	13	F	6'9"	---	Freshman	Dana Point, California	
Liam Lloyd	21	G	6'5"	190	Junior	Spokane, Washington	Transferred to Arizona
Isaiah Kai	23	G	6'2"	---	Freshman	Gilbert, Arizona	

=== Incoming transfers ===
Incoming transfers
Name	Number	Pos.	Height	Weight	Year	Hometown	Previous School
Monty Bowser	2	G/F	6'7"	205	Senior	Oakland, California	California
Dillan Baker	21	G	6'6"	215	Junior	Tucson, Arizona	Pima CC
Ali Ragab	22	C	7'0"	275	Senior	Cairo, Egypt	West Virginia
Leigh Rickwood-Pitt	34	F	6'10"	200	Junior	Busselton, Australia	Eastern Arizona College

=== Recruiting class ===
College recruiting
Name	Hometown	School	Height	Weight	Commit date
Tyler Hutton; G	Santa Cruz, California	Cactus High School	6 ft 4 in (1.93 m)	200 lb (91 kg)	Jun 13, 2024
Tyler Hutton; G	Recruit ratings: Scout: Rivals: 247Sports: (NR)				
Overall recruit ranking:
Note: In many cases, Scout, Rivals, 247Sports, On3, and ESPN may conflict in their listings of height and weight.; In these cases, the average was taken. ESPN grades are on a 100-point scale.; Sources: "2024 Team Ranking". Rivals.

== Roster ==
2024–25 Northern Arizona Lumberjacks men's basketball team
Players
Coaches

Pos.	#	Name	Height	Weight	Year	Previous school	Hometown
G	0	C.J. Ford	6 ft 0 in (1.83 m)	185 lb (84 kg)	Jr	Duncanville High School	Crowley, Texas
F	1	Arman Madi	6 ft 6 in (1.98 m)	220 lb (100 kg)	So	Brophy College Prep	Paradise Valley, Arizona
G/F	2	Monty Bowser	6 ft 7 in (2.01 m)	205 lb (93 kg)	Sr	California	Oakland, California
G	3	Jayden Jackson	6 ft 4 in (1.93 m)	205 lb (93 kg)	RS Jr	Whitefish Bay High School	Milwaukee, Wisconsin
G	4	Oakland Fort	5 ft 10 in (1.78 m)	170 lb (77 kg)	Jr	Sunnyslope High School	Phoenix, Arizona
G	6	Tyler Hutton	6 ft 4 in (1.93 m)	200 lb (91 kg)	Fr	Cactus High School	Santa Cruz, California
F	10	Jack Wistrcill	6 ft 8 in (2.03 m)	225 lb (102 kg)	So	Olympus High School	Salt Lake City, Utah
G	11	Ryan Abelman	6 ft 3 in (1.91 m)	185 lb (84 kg)	Jr	Bishop Gorman High School	Las Vegas, Nevada
F	12	Diego Campisano	6 ft 5 in (1.96 m)	210 lb (95 kg)	RS Jr	Torrey Pines High School	San Diego, California
G	21	Dillan Baker	6 ft 6 in (1.98 m)	215 lb (98 kg)	Jr	Pima Community College	Tucson, Arizona
C	22	Ali Ragab	7 ft 0 in (2.13 m)	275 lb (125 kg)	Sr	West Virginia	Cairo, Egypt
G	24	Trent McLaughlin	6 ft 6 in (1.98 m)	200 lb (91 kg)	Sr	Central Connecticut	Chandler, Arizona
F	33	Carson Towt	6 ft 8 in (2.03 m)	235 lb (107 kg)	RS Jr	Gilbert High School	Gilbert, Arizona
F	34	Leigh Rickwood-Pitt	6 ft 10 in (2.08 m)	200 lb (91 kg)	Jr	Eastern Arizona College	Busselton, Australia

Head coach

- Shane Burcar (Ottawa)

Assistant coach(es)

- Gary Bell Jr. (Gonzaga)
- Tim Russo (Tampa)
- Jack Mitchell (UCLA)

Legend

- (C) Team captain
- (S) Suspended
- (I) Ineligible
- (W) Walk-on
- Injured
- Current redshirt

Roster
Last update: October 26, 2024

== Schedule and results ==
Date time, TV	Rank^{#}	Opponent^{#}	Result	Record	High points	High rebounds	High assists	Site (attendance) city, state
Non-conference regular season
November 4, 2024*; 6:00 pm, ESPN+		Park–Gilbert	W 100–49	1–0	27 – McLaughlin	11 – Towt	6 – Fort	Rolle Activity Center (770); Flagstaff, AZ
November 8, 2024*; 6:00 pm, ESPN+		Nelson	W 115–67	2–0	30 – McLaughlin	14 – Towt	7 – Towt	Rolle Activity Center (504); Flagstaff, AZ
November 12, 2024*; 8:00 pm, ACCNX/ESPN+		at Stanford	L 64–90	2–1	20 – McLaughlin	3 – Tied	5 – Towt	Maples Pavilion (2,055); Stanford, CA
November 14, 2024*; 8:00 pm, ESPN+		at Pacific	W 60–57	3–1	22 – McLaughlin	10 – Towt	4 – McLaughlin	Alex G. Spanos Center (1,045); Stockton, CA
November 19, 2024*; 12:00 pm, ESPN+		Embry–Riddle (AZ)	W 82–47	4–1	21 – McLaughlin	9 – Towt	5 – McLaughlin	Rolle Activity Center (798); Flagstaff, AZ
November 22, 2024*; 6:00 pm, ESPN+		Incarnate Word	W 75–74	5–1	23 – Jackson	11 – Towt	6 – McLaughlin	Rolle Activity Center (583); Flagstaff, AZ
November 26, 2024*; 2:30 pm		vs. Eastern Michigan; Houston Christian MTE	L 68–72	5–2	25 – McLaughlin	13 – Towt	3 – Tied	Sharp Gymnasium (344); Houston, TX
November 27, 2024*; 6:00 pm, ESPN+		at Houston Christian; Houston Christian MTE	W 74–71	6–2	20 – McLaughlin	8 – Towt	4 – Jackson	Sharp Gymnasium (498); Houston, TX
December 4, 2024*; 6:00 pm		at Oral Roberts; Big Sky-Summit Challenge	L 76–83	6–3	24 – McLaughlin	16 – Towt	4 – Towt	Mabee Center (2,934); Tulsa, OK
December 7, 2024*; 12:00 pm, ESPN+		South Dakota; Big Sky-Summit Challenge	W 95–82	7–3	23 – McLaughlin	18 – Towt	7 – Jackson	Rolle Activity Center (444); Flagstaff, AZ
December 14, 2024*; 2:00 pm, ESPN+		at Pepperdine	L 76–86	7–4	26 – McLaughlin	16 – Towt	7 – Jackson	Firestone Fieldhouse (575); Malibu, CA
December 21, 2024*; 2:00 pm, ESPN+		at Southern Utah	W 83–75	8–4	26 – McLaughlin	17 – Towt	7 – McLaughlin	America First Event Center (741); Cedar City, UT
December 30, 2024*; 6:00 pm, ESPN+		Benedictine Mesa	W 110–74	9–4	22 – Tied	12 – Towt	6 – Fort	Findlay Toyota Court (867); Flagstaff, AZ
Big Sky regular season
January 2, 2025; 6:00 pm, ESPN+		Idaho State	L 67–72	9–5 (0–1)	16 – Towt	12 – Towt	5 – McLaughlin	Findlay Toyota Court (685); Flagstaff, AZ
January 4, 2025; 2:00 pm, ESPN+		Weber State	W 80–77	10–5 (1–1)	30 – McLaughlin	7 – McLaughlin	4 – Fort	Findlay Toyota Court (561); Flagstaff, AZ
January 9, 2025; 7:00 pm, ESPN+		at Montana	L 76–81	10–6 (1–2)	22 – Jackson	10 – Towt	7 – Jackson	Dahlberg Arena (2,572); Missoula, MT
January 11, 2025; 6:00 pm, ESPN+		at Montana State	L 53–58	10–7 (1–3)	24 – McLaughlin	17 – Towt	3 – Towt	Worthington Arena (2,772); Bozeman, MT
January 16, 2025; 6:00 pm, ESPN+		Sacramento State	W 77–53	11–7 (2–3)	21 – McLaughlin	14 – Towt	6 – Towt	Findlay Toyota Court (889); Flagstaff, AZ
January 18, 2025; 6:00 pm, ESPN+		Portland State	L 69–80	11–8 (2–4)	18 – Campisano	19 – Towt	5 – Towt	Findlay Toyota Court (1,172); Flagstaff, AZ
January 23, 2025; 7:00 pm, ESPN+		at Eastern Washington	W 70–61	12–8 (3–4)	20 – McLaughlin	10 – Towt	7 – Jackson	Reese Court (1,249); Cheney, WA
January 25, 2025; 2:00 pm, ESPN+		at Idaho	W 80–72	13–8 (4–4)	19 – Campisano	18 – Towt	7 – Jackson	ICCU Arena (1,979); Moscow, ID
February 1, 2025; 2:00 pm, ESPN+		at Northern Colorado	L 69–87	13–9 (4–5)	16 – Tied	19 – Towt	2 – Towt	Bank of Colorado Arena (1,653); Greeley, CO
February 3, 2025; 6:00 pm, ESPN+		at Weber State	L 73–77	13–10 (4–6)	35 – McLaughlin	16 – Towt	5 – Jackson	Dee Events Center (2,537); Ogden, UT
February 6, 2025; 6:00 pm, ESPN+		Montana State	W 69–64	14–10 (5–6)	20 – McLaughlin	17 – Towt	6 – McLaughlin	Findlay Toyota Court (789); Flagstaff, AZ
February 8, 2025; 6:00 pm, ESPN+		Montana	L 80–83	14–11 (5–7)	19 – McLaughlin	13 – Towt	8 – Towt	Findlay Toyota Court (1,212); Flagstaff, AZ
February 13, 2025; 8:00 pm, ESPN+		at Portland State	L 46–58	14–12 (5–8)	14 – Campisano	10 – Towt	3 – Jackson	Viking Pavilion (200); Portland, OR
February 15, 2025; 2:00 pm, ESPN+		at Sacramento State	W 65–61	15–12 (6–8)	20 – McLaughlin	10 – Towt	6 – Towt	Hornets Nest (810); Sacramento, CA
February 20, 2025; 6:00 pm, ESPN+		Idaho	L 78–83	15–13 (6–9)	35 – McLaughlin	8 – Towt	3 – Tied	Findlay Toyota Court (702); Flagstaff, AZ
February 22, 2025; 2:00 pm, ESPN+		Eastern Washington	W 87–67	16–13 (7–9)	23 – McLaughlin	7 – Towt	6 – Tied	Findlay Toyota Court (804); Flagstaff, AZ
March 1, 2025; 7:00 pm, ESPN+		Northern Colorado	L 73–83	16–14 (7–10)	35 – McLaughlin	14 – Towt	3 – Tied	Findlay Toyota Court (1,389); Flagstaff, AZ
March 3, 2025; 7:00 pm, ESPN+		at Idaho State	W 82–79	17–14 (8–10)	24 – Towt	12 – Towt	5 – McLaughlin	Reed Gym (1,836); Pocatello, ID
Big Sky tournament
March 8, 2025; 8:00 pm, ESPN+	(7)	vs. (8) Eastern Washington; First round	W 66–53	18–14	17 – McLaughlin	12 – Towt	3 – Tied	Idaho Central Arena; Boise, ID
March 9, 2025; 8:00 pm, ESPN+	(7)	vs. (2) Montana; Quarterfinals	L 65–74	18–15	34 – McLaughlin	13 – Towt	3 – Jackson	Idaho Central Arena; Boise, ID
CBI
March 23, 2025; 4:30 pm, FloSports		vs. Queens (NC); First round	L 78–85	18–16	23 – Jackson	13 – Towt	4 – Tied	Ocean Center; Daytona Beach, FL
*Non-conference game. ^{#}Rankings from AP Poll. (#) Tournament seedings in parentheses. All times are in Mountain.
