= 2024–25 Weber State Wildcats men's basketball team =

American college basketball season

2024–25 Weber State Wildcats men's basketball

Arizona Tip-Off Desert Division champions
- Conference: Big Sky Conference
- Record: 12–22 (5–13 Big Sky)
- Head coach: Eric Duft (3rd season)
- Associate head coach: Dan Russell
- Assistant coaches: Jorge Ruiz; Leonard Perry
- Home arena: Dee Events Center

2024–25 Big Sky men's basketball standings
	Conf.				Overall
Team	W		L	PCT	W		L	PCT
Northern Colorado	15	–	3	.833	25	–	10	.714
Montana †	15	–	3	.833	25	–	10	.714
Portland State	11	–	7	.611	19	–	13	.594
Idaho State	10	–	8	.556	15	–	15	.500
Montana State	9	–	9	.500	15	–	18	.455
Idaho	8	–	10	.444	14	–	19	.424
Northern Arizona	8	–	10	.444	18	–	16	.529
Eastern Washington	6	–	12	.333	10	–	22	.313
Weber State	5	–	13	.278	12	–	22	.353
Sacramento State	3	–	15	.167	7	–	25	.219
† 2025 Big Sky tournament winner

The 2024–25 Weber State Wildcats men's basketball team represented Weber State University during the 2024–25 NCAA Division I men's basketball season. The Wildcats, led by third-year head coach Eric Duft, played their home games at the Dee Events Center located in Ogden, Utah as members of the Big Sky Conference.

== Previous season ==
The Wildcats finished the 2023–24 season 20–12, 11–7 in Big Sky play to finish in fourth place. They were defeated by eventual tournament champions Montana State in the quarterfinals of the Big Sky tournament.

== Offseason ==
=== Departures ===
Departures
Name	Number	Pos.	Height	Weight	Year	Hometown	Notes
Dillon Jones	2	F	6'6"	235	Junior	Columbia, South Carolina	Declared for NBA draft
KJ Cunningham	3	G	6'2"	190	Senior	Bryan, Texas	Graduated
Cole Lake	5	G	5'11"	175	Junior	Eagle, Idaho	Transferred to Lethbridge Polytechnic
Steven Verplancken	11	G	6'4"	205	Senior	San Pedro de Macorís, Dominican Republic	Graduated
Chris Dockery	12	G/F	6'6"	185	(redshirt) Freshman	Las Vegas, Nevada	Transferred to Independence CC
Carter Gittens	13	G	6'5"	215	Freshman	Peoria, Arizona	
Isaiah Somers	15	G	6'5"	200	Junior	Chandler, Arizona	
Louie Jordan	30	F	6'9"	215	Sophomore	Leicester, England	Transferred to UMBC
Arnaud Revaz	31	F	6'10"	230	Junior	Sion, Switzerland	Transferred to UT Tyler
Handje Tamba	32	C	6'11"	230	Sophomore	Kinshasa, DR Congo	Transferred to Milligan

=== Incoming transfers ===
Incoming transfers
Name	Number	Pos.	Height	Weight	Year	Hometown	Previous School
Miguel Tomley	3	G	6'3"	200	Senior	Surrey, British Columbia	Idaho State
Nigel Burris	5	F	6'7"	225	Junior	San Francisco, California	Utah State
Andrew Younan	7	G	6'5"	205	Sophomore	Westlake Village, California	Portland
Vasilije Vucinic	13	C	6'11"	250	Senior	Bijelo Polje, Montenegro	Portland

=== Recruiting class ===
College recruiting information
Name	Hometown	School	Height	Weight	Commit date
David Hansen; F	Magrath, Alberta	Magrath High School	6 ft 9 in (2.06 m)	200 lb (91 kg)	Sep 13, 2023
David Hansen; F	Recruit ratings: Scout: Rivals: 247Sports: (NR)				
Trevor Hennig; G	North Bend, Washington	Mount Si High School	6 ft 4 in (1.93 m)	185 lb (84 kg)	Oct 11, 2023
Trevor Hennig; G	Recruit ratings: Scout: Rivals: 247Sports: (NR)				
Saadiq Moore; G	Pasadena, California	Middlebrooks Academy	6 ft 5 in (1.96 m)	185 lb (84 kg)	Mar 7, 2024
Saadiq Moore; G	Recruit ratings: Scout: Rivals: 247Sports: (NR)				
Declan Cutler; F	Vancouver, British Columbia	Royal Crown School	6 ft 9 in (2.06 m)	230 lb (100 kg)	Mar 29, 2024
Declan Cutler; F	Recruit ratings: Scout: Rivals: 247Sports: (NR)				
Logan Kilbert; G	Clovis, California	Sierra High School	6 ft 3 in (1.91 m)	195 lb (88 kg)	Apr 25, 2024
Logan Kilbert; G	Recruit ratings: Scout: Rivals: 247Sports: (NR)				
Niyol Hauet; G	Yokohama, Japan	Ogden High School	6 ft 4 in (1.93 m)	175 lb (79 kg)	May 22, 2024
Niyol Hauet; G	Recruit ratings: Scout: Rivals: 247Sports: (NR)				
Overall recruit ranking:
Note: In many cases, Scout, Rivals, 247Sports, On3, and ESPN may conflict in their listings of height and weight.; In these cases, the average was taken. ESPN grades are on a 100-point scale.; Sources: "2024 Team Ranking". Rivals.

== Roster ==
2024–25 Weber State Wildcats men's basketball team
Players
Coaches

Pos.	#	Name	Height	Weight	Year	Previous school	Hometown
G	0	Blaise Threatt	6 ft 3 in (1.91 m)	210 lb (95 kg)	Sr	Colorado Mesa	Scottsdale, Arizona
G	3	Miguel Tomley	6 ft 3 in (1.91 m)	200 lb (91 kg)	Sr	Idaho State	Surrey, British Columbia
F	4	Dyson Koehler	6 ft 7 in (2.01 m)	220 lb (100 kg)	Sr	Jordan High School	Draper, Utah
F	5	Nigel Burris	6 ft 7 in (2.01 m)	225 lb (102 kg)	Jr	Utah State	San Francisco, California
G	6	Trevor Hennig	6 ft 4 in (1.93 m)	185 lb (84 kg)	Fr	Mount Si High School	North Bend, Washington
G	7	Andrew Younan	6 ft 5 in (1.96 m)	205 lb (93 kg)	So	Portland	Westlake Village, California
G/F	8	Viljami Vartiainen	6 ft 6 in (1.98 m)	195 lb (88 kg)	So	Helsinki Basketball Academy	Helsinki, Finland
F	10	Marko Sarenac	6 ft 10 in (2.08 m)	220 lb (100 kg)	So	KK Spartak Subotica	Zrenjanin, Serbia
G	11	Saadiq Moore	6 ft 5 in (1.96 m)	185 lb (84 kg)	Fr	Middlebrooks Academy	Pasadena, California
C	13	Vasilije Vucinic	6 ft 11 in (2.11 m)	250 lb (113 kg)	Sr	Portland	Bijelo Polje, Montenegro
F	15	Declan Cutler	6 ft 9 in (2.06 m)	230 lb (104 kg)	Fr	Royal Crown School	Vancouver, British Columbia
C	20	Alex Tew	6 ft 11 in (2.11 m)	250 lb (113 kg)	Sr	Cooper International Academy	Cheshire, England
G	21	Niyol Hauet	6 ft 4 in (1.93 m)	175 lb (79 kg)	Fr	Ogden High School	Yokohama, Japan
G	23	Nemanja Sarenac	6 ft 5 in (1.96 m)	210 lb (95 kg)	RS Fr	Hoosac School	Belgrade, Serbia
F	33	David Hansen	6 ft 9 in (2.06 m)	200 lb (91 kg)	Fr	Magrath High School	Magrath, Alberta
G	34	Logan Kilbert	6 ft 3 in (1.91 m)	195 lb (88 kg)	Fr	Sierra High School	Clovis, California

Head coach

- Eric Duft (Sterling (KS))

Assistant coach(es)

- Dan Russell (Wyoming)
- Jorge Ruiz (Grand Canyon)
- Leonard Perry (Idaho)

Legend

- (C) Team captain
- (S) Suspended
- (I) Ineligible
- (W) Walk-on
- Injured
- Current redshirt

Roster
Last update: October 16, 2024

== Schedule and results ==
Date time, TV	Rank^{#}	Opponent^{#}	Result	Record	High points	High rebounds	High assists	Site (attendance) city, state
Exhibition
October 18, 2024*; 7:00 pm, MW Network		at Utah State; Charity Exhibition	L 66–85	–	16 – Vartiainen	6 – Tied	4 – Moore	Smith Spectrum (4,157); Logan, UT
October 28, 2024*; 7:00 pm		Adams State	W 83–63	–	15 – Tied	8 – Threatt	9 – Threatt	Dee Events Center; Ogden, UT
Non-conference regular season
November 4, 2024*; 7:00 pm, ESPN+		Northwest Indian	W 118–35	1–0	22 – Koehler	10 – Cutler	7 – Threatt	Dee Events Center (1,368); Ogden, UT
November 8, 2024*; 8:00 pm, ESPN+		at Oregon State	L 48–76	1–1	14 – Threatt	6 – Threatt	4 – Threatt	Gill Coliseum (3,041); Corvallis, OR
November 13, 2024*; 7:00 pm, ESPN+		at Nevada	L 55–88	1–2	13 – Threatt	12 – Vucinic	4 – Threatt	Lawlor Events Center; Reno, NV
November 17, 2024*; 8:00 pm, ESPN+		at Hawaii	L 68–73 ^{OT}	1–3	27 – Threatt	9 – Tied	3 – Threatt	Stan Sheriff Center (4,433); Honolulu, HI
November 22, 2024*; 7:00 pm, ESPN+		UC Irvine	L 87–93	1–4	22 – Threatt	5 – Tied	6 – Threatt	Dee Events Center (3,559); Ogden, UT
November 25, 2024*; 7:00 pm, ESPN+		Justice	W 93–45	2–4	16 – Threatt	7 – Tied	5 – Moore	Dee Events Center (1,589); Ogden, UT
November 29, 2024*; 11:00 am		vs. Bowling Green; Arizona Tip-Off Desert Division semifinals	W 73–70	3–4	19 – Threatt	7 – Tied	4 – Threatt	Mullett Arena; Tempe, AZ
November 30, 2024*; 2:30 pm		vs. Pepperdine; Arizona Tip-Off Desert Division championships	W 68–53	4–4	28 – Tomley	9 – Koehler	4 – Threatt	Mullett Arena (924); Tempe, AZ
December 4, 2024*; 7:00 pm, ESPN+		North Dakota State; Big Sky-Summit Challenge	L 73–77	4–5	18 – Vartiainen	6 – Burris	6 – Threatt	Dee Events Center (3,291); Ogden, UT
December 7, 2024*; 6:00 pm		at North Dakota; Big Sky-Summit Challenge	L 75–80	4–6	23 – Threatt	7 – Burris	2 – Tied	Betty Engelstad Sioux Center (1,696); Grand Forks, ND
December 13, 2024*; 7:00 pm, ESPN+		at Utah Tech	W 73–71	5–6	21 – Tomley	13 – Vucinic	4 – Tomley	Burns Arena (1,559); St. George, UT
December 18, 2024*; 7:00 pm, ESPN+		Lincoln	W 128–58	6–6	18 – Threatt	10 – Threatt	5 – Moore	Dee Events Center (1,422); Ogden, UT
December 21, 2024*; 7:00 pm, ESPN+		Utah Valley	L 62–64	6–7	17 – Burris	10 – Burris	3 – Threatt	Dee Events Center (3,609); Ogden, UT
December 29, 2024*; 3:00 pm, BTN+		at No. 9 Oregon	L 49–89	6–8	15 – Threatt	4 – Tied	3 – Tew	Matthew Knight Arena (7,320); Eugene, OR
Big Sky regular season
January 2, 2025; 6:00 pm, ESPN+		at Northern Colorado	L 72–89	6–9 (9–1)	17 – Hennig	5 – Tied	3 – Tied	Bank of Colorado Arena (1,006); Greeley, CO
January 4, 2025; 2:00 pm, ESPN+		at Northern Arizona	L 77–80	6–10 (0–2)	19 – Vucinic	8 – Vucinic	6 – Threatt	Findlay Toyota Court (561); Flagstaff, AZ
January 11, 2025; 6:00 pm, ESPN+		at Idaho State	W 77–69	7–10 (1–2)	21 – Koehler	7 – Threatt	3 – Burris	Reed Gym (2,323); Pocatello, ID
January 16, 2025; 7:00 pm, ESPN+		Montana	L 59–63	7–11 (1–3)	16 – Tomley	9 – Vucinic	4 – Tied	Dee Events Center (3,336); Ogden, UT
January 18, 2025; 7:00 pm, ESPN+		Montana State	L 71–80	7–12 (1–4)	13 – Tied	9 – Burris	4 – Hennig	Dee Events Center (3,895); Ogden, UT
January 23, 2025; 8:00 pm, ESPN+		at Portland State	L 56–74	7–13 (1–5)	22 – Threatt	7 – Threatt	4 – Threatt	Viking Pavilion (1,025); Portland, OR
January 25, 2025; 2:00 pm, ESPN+		at Sacramento State	W 87–81	8–13 (2–5)	26 – Threatt	9 – Threatt	7 – Threatt	Hornets Nest (752); Sacramento, CA
January 30, 2025; 7:00 pm, ESPN+		Idaho	L 74–82	8–14 (2–6)	19 – Threatt	6 – Threatt	8 – Threatt	Dee Events Center (3,449); Ogden, UT
February 1, 2025; 1:00 pm, ESPN+		Eastern Washington	L 49–72	8–15 (2–7)	17 – Threatt	7 – Threatt	3 – Threatt	Dee Events Center (2,428); Ogden, UT
February 3, 2025; 7:00 pm, ESPN+		Northern Arizona	W 77–73	9–15 (3–7)	34 – Threatt	10 – Threatt	3 – Moore	Dee Events Center (2,537); Ogden, UT
February 8, 2025; 7:00 pm, ESPN+		Idaho State	L 67–72	9–16 (3–8)	21 – Hennig	6 – Hennig	5 – Threatt	Dee Events Center (3,046); Ogden, UT
February 13, 2025; 7:00 pm, ESPN+		at Montana State	L 66–74	9–17 (3–9)	32 – Threatt	9 – Burris	6 – Threatt	Worthington Arena (2,707); Bozeman, MT
February 15, 2025; 7:00 pm, ESPN+		at Montana	L 58–65	9–18 (3–10)	24 – Threatt	5 – Tied	4 – Threatt	Dahlberg Arena (3,318); Missoula, MT
February 20, 2025; 7:00 pm, ESPN+		Sacramento State	L 77–80	9–19 (3–11)	24 – Vartiainen	6 – Threatt	8 – Threatt	Dee Events Center (2,196); Ogden, UT
February 22, 2025; 2:00 pm, ESPN+		Portland State	W 60–58	10–19 (4–11)	27 – Threatt	10 – Burris	3 – Hennig	Dee Events Center (2,144); Ogden, UT
February 27, 2025; 7:00 pm, ESPN+		at Eastern Washington	W 66–64	11–19 (5–11)	16 – Tew	5 – Threatt	7 – Threatt	Reese Court (1,354); Cheney, WA
March 1, 2025; 3:00 pm, ESPN+		at Idaho	L 79–81 ^{OT}	11–20 (5–12)	32 – Threatt	9 – Burris	9 – Threatt	ICCU Arena (2,262); Moscow, ID
March 3, 2025; 7:00 pm, ESPN+		Northern Colorado	L 63–68	11–21 (5–13)	29 – Threatt	8 – Threatt	4 – Threatt	Dee Events Center (2,633); Ogden, UT
Big Sky tournament
March 8, 2025; 5:30 pm, ESPN+	(9)	vs. (10) Sacramento State; First round	W 83–70	12–21	30 – Vartiainen	6 – Threatt	7 – Threatt	Idaho Central Arena; Boise, ID
March 9, 2025; 5:30 pm, ESPN+	(9)	vs. (1) Northern Colorado; Quarterfinals	L 52–76	12–22	12 – Threatt	8 – Threatt	1 – Tied	Idaho Central Arena; Boise, ID
*Non-conference game. ^{#}Rankings from AP Poll. (#) Tournament seedings in parentheses. All times are in Mountain.
