= 2024–25 Sacramento State Hornets men's basketball team =

American college basketball season

2024–25 Sacramento State Hornets men's basketball
- Conference: Big Sky Conference
- Record: 7–25 (3–15 Big Sky)
- Head coach: Michael Czepil (interim)
- Assistant coaches: Hays Myers; Van Green; Elijah Roth; Zach Chappell
- Home arena: Hornets Nest

2024–25 Big Sky men's basketball standings
	Conf.				Overall
Team	W		L	PCT	W		L	PCT
Northern Colorado	15	–	3	.833	25	–	10	.714
Montana †	15	–	3	.833	25	–	10	.714
Portland State	11	–	7	.611	19	–	13	.594
Idaho State	10	–	8	.556	15	–	15	.500
Montana State	9	–	9	.500	15	–	18	.455
Idaho	8	–	10	.444	14	–	19	.424
Northern Arizona	8	–	10	.444	18	–	16	.529
Eastern Washington	6	–	12	.333	10	–	22	.313
Weber State	5	–	13	.278	12	–	22	.353
Sacramento State	3	–	15	.167	7	–	25	.219
† 2025 Big Sky tournament winner

The 2024–25 Sacramento State Hornets men's basketball team represented California State University, Sacramento during the 2024–25 NCAA Division I men's basketball season. The Hornets, led by interim head coach Michael Czepil, played their home games at the Hornets Nest in Sacramento, California as members of the Big Sky Conference.

== Previous season ==
The Hornets finished the 2023–24 season 10–24, 4–14 in Big Sky play, to finish in tenth (last) place. They defeated Idaho in the first round and upset top-seeded Eastern Washington in the quarterfinals, before falling to eventual tournament champions Montana State in the semifinals of the Big Sky tournament.

On May 22, 2024, head coach David Patrick announced that he would be stepping down in order to take the associate head coaching position at LSU, with associate head coach Michael Czepil being named interim head coach for the upcoming season.

== Offseason ==
=== Departures ===
Departures
Name	Number	Pos.	Height	Weight	Year	Hometown	Notes
Brandon Betson	1	G	6' 1"	190	Senior	Hercules, CA	Graduated
Akol Mawein	3	F	6' 9"	220	Senior	Sydney, Australia	Graduated
Quadry Adams	11	G	6' 4"	190	Junior	Piscataway, NJ	Transferred to Chaminade
Austin Patterson	20	G	6' 3"	185	Junior	Sonora, CA	Transferred to Montana
Zee Hamoda	24	G	6' 7"	180	Junior	Riffa, Bahrain	
Duncan Powell	31	F	6' 8"	240	Sophomore	Dallas, TX	Transferred to Georgia Tech

=== Incoming transfers ===
Incoming transfers
Name	Number	Pos.	Height	Weight	Year	Hometown	Previous school
Jalen Pitre	1	F	6' 8"	220	Junior	Long Beach, CA	Pepperdine
EJ Neal	3	G	6' 5"	200	Senior	San Francisco, CA	Idaho
Deonte Williams	6	G	6' 6"	210	Junior	Sydney, Australia	South Georgia Tech

=== Recruiting class ===
College recruiting information
Name	Hometown	School	Height	Weight	Commit date
Lachlan Brewer; G	Tasmania, Australia	Launceston College	6 ft 6 in (1.98 m)	190 lb (86 kg)	Oct 10, 2023
Lachlan Brewer; G	Recruit ratings: Scout: Rivals: 247Sports: (NR)				
Leo Ricketts; G	Pleasant Hill, CA	De La Salle High School	6 ft 0 in (1.83 m)	160 lb (73 kg)	May 24, 2024
Leo Ricketts; G	Recruit ratings: Scout: Rivals: 247Sports: (NR)				
Overall recruit ranking:
Note: In many cases, Scout, Rivals, 247Sports, On3, and ESPN may conflict in their listings of height and weight.; In these cases, the average was taken. ESPN grades are on a 100-point scale.; Sources: "2024 Team Ranking". Rivals.

== Roster ==
2024–25 Sacramento State Hornets men's basketball team
Players
Coaches

Pos.	#	Name	Height	Weight	Year	Previous school	Hometown
F	1	Jalen Pitre	6 ft 8 in (2.03 m)	220 lb (100 kg)	Jr	Pepperdine	Long Beach, CA
G	2	Bailey Nunn	6 ft 0 in (1.83 m)	160 lb (73 kg)	So	Knox Raiders	Melbourne, Australia
G	3	EJ Neal	6 ft 5 in (1.96 m)	200 lb (91 kg)	Sr	Idaho	San Francisco, CA
G	4	Alex Kovatchev	6 ft 5 in (1.96 m)	190 lb (86 kg)	So	Australian Centre of Excellence	Perth, Australia
G	5	Michael Wilson	6 ft 2 in (1.88 m)	195 lb (88 kg)	So	Sacramento High School	Sacramento, CA
G	6	Deonte Williams	6 ft 6 in (1.98 m)	210 lb (95 kg)	Jr	South Georgia Tech	Sydney, Australia
G	7	Lachlan Brewer	6 ft 6 in (1.98 m)	190 lb (86 kg)	Fr	Launceston College	Launceston, Australia
G	10	Emil Skytta	6 ft 4 in (1.93 m)	195 lb (88 kg)	So	Central Michigan	Helsinki, Finland
G	11	Leo Ricketts	6 ft 0 in (1.83 m)	160 lb (73 kg)	Fr	De La Salle High School	Pleasant Hill, CA
F	14	Kiir Kiir Chol Deng	6 ft 9 in (2.06 m)	215 lb (98 kg)	So	NBA Global Academy	Juba, South Sudan
F	15	Jacob Holt	6 ft 10 in (2.08 m)	250 lb (113 kg)	Sr	Santa Clara	Delta, BC
G	24	Julian Vaughns	6 ft 3 in (1.91 m)	175 lb (79 kg)	Jr	Alberta	Oakland, CA
F	25	Bowyn Beatty	7 ft 0 in (2.13 m)	225 lb (102 kg)	So	NBA Global Academy	Canberra, Australia
F	34	Chudi Dioramma	6 ft 10 in (2.08 m)	245 lb (111 kg)	Fr	Haringey Sixth Form College	London, England

Head coach

- Michael Czepil (Nicholls State)

Assistant coach(es)

- Hays Myers (LSU)
- Van Green (Rice)
- Elijah Roth (Arizona)
- Zach Chappell (Sacramento State)

Legend

- (C) Team captain
- (S) Suspended
- (I) Ineligible
- (W) Walk-on
- Injured
- Current redshirt

Roster
Last update: October 16, 2024

== Schedule and results ==
Date time, TV	Rank^{#}	Opponent^{#}	Result	Record	High points	High rebounds	High assists	Site (attendance) city, state
Non-conference regular season
November 5, 2024*; 7:00 p.m., ESPN+		Cal Maritime	W 106–44	1–0	16 – tied	8 – tied	8 – Williams	Hornets Nest (529); Sacramento, CA
November 8, 2024*; 7:00 p.m., MWN		at Fresno State	L 57–64	1–1	17 – Vaughns	7 – Kovatchev	4 – tied	Save Mart Center (5,657); Fresno, CA
November 12, 2024*; 7:00 p.m., ESPN+		at UC San Diego	L 54–64	1–2	14 – Kovatchev	7 – tied	3 – tied	LionTree Arena (1,031); La Jolla, CA
November 16, 2024*; 5:00 p.m., ESPN+		Cal State Northridge	L 69–79	1–3	20 – Holt	6 – Kovatchev	4 – tied	Hornets Nest (578); Sacramento, CA
November 24, 2024*; 1:00 p.m., ACCNX		at California; Cal Classic	L 77–83	1–4	25 – Holt	8 – Holt	5 – Skytta	Haas Pavilion (3,662); Berkeley, CA
November 27, 2024*; 1:00 p.m., MWN		at Air Force; Cal Classic	W 63–61	2–4	12 – tied	8 – Holt	7 – Nunn	Clune Arena (1,529); Colorado Springs, CO
November 30, 2024*; 7:00 p.m., ESPN+		Mercyhurst; Cal Classic	L 60–66	2–5	15 – Holt	6 – Holt	4 – Skytta	Hornets Nest (415); Sacramento, CA
December 4, 2024*; 6:00 p.m., SLN		at Denver; Big Sky–Summit Challenge	L 59–80	2–6	24 – Holt	9 – Holt	2 – tied	Hamilton Gymnasium (422); Denver, CO
December 7, 2024*; 1:00 p.m., ESPN+		Omaha; Big Sky–Summit Challenge	L 60–70	2–7	15 – Holt	10 – Dioramma	6 – Nunn	Hornets Nest (502); Sacramento, CA
December 14, 2024*; 7:00 p.m., ESPN+		UC Davis; Causeway Cup	L 62–69	2–8	17 – Holt	7 – Holt	4 – tied	Hornets Nest (902); Sacramento, CA
December 17, 2024*; 7:00 p.m., ESPN+		at Oregon State	L 45–82	2–9	9 – Holt	5 – tied	2 – Nunn	Gill Coliseum (2,314); Corvallis, OR
December 22, 2024*; 1:00 p.m., ESPN+		Stanislaus State	W 98–47	3–9	23 – Holt	10 – Dioramma	4 – tied	Hornets Nest (510); Sacramento, CA
December 30, 2024*; 1:00 p.m., ESPN+		Bethesda	W 78–38	4–9	21 – Holt	10 – Holt	7 – Skytta	Hornets Nest (416); Sacramento, CA
Big Sky regular season
January 4, 2025; 1:00 p.m., ESPN+		Portland State	W 56–53	5–9 (1–0)	12 – Neal	10 – Holt	6 – Nunn	Hornets Nest (397); Sacramento, CA
January 9, 2025; 7:00 p.m., ESPN+		Idaho	L 67–80	5–10 (1–1)	35 – Holt	10 – Holt	7 – Nunn	Hornets Nest (587); Sacramento, CA
January 11, 2025; 1:00 p.m., ESPN+		Eastern Washington	L 54–65	5–11 (1–2)	11 – Vaughns	7 – Beatty	3 – Neal	Hornets Nest (478); Sacramento, CA
January 16, 2025; 5:00 p.m., ESPN+		at Northern Arizona	L 53–77	5–12 (1–3)	18 – tied	11 – Holt	4 – Vaughns	Findlay Toyota Court (889); Flagstaff, AZ
January 18, 2025; 5:00 p.m., ESPN+		at Northern Colorado	L 64–68	5–13 (1–4)	25 – Holt	9 – Holt	4 – Nunn	Bank of Colorado Arena (1,521); Greeley, CO
January 23, 2025; 7:00 p.m., ESPN+		Idaho State	W 75–71	6–13 (2–4)	21 – Vaughns	7 – Vaughns	5 – Nunn	Hornets Nest (1,007); Sacramento, CA
January 25, 2025; 1:00 p.m., ESPN+		Weber State	L 81–87	6–14 (2–5)	18 – Holt	7 – Vaughns	4 – Ricketts	Hornets Nest (752); Sacramento, CA
January 30, 2025; 6:00 p.m., ESPN+		at Montana State	L 58–70	6–15 (2–6)	19 – Vaughns	10 – Holt	2 – tied	Worthington Arena (3,209); Bozeman, MT
February 1, 2025; 3:00 p.m., ESPN+		at Montana	L 59–87	6–16 (2–7)	13 – tied	6 – Holt	2 – Vaughns	Dahlberg Arena (3,344); Missoula, MT
February 6, 2025; 6:00 p.m., ESPN+		at Eastern Washington	L 80–83	6–17 (2–8)	32 – Holt	7 – Holt	4 – Nunn	Reese Court (1,197); Cheney, WA
February 8, 2025; 2:00 p.m., ESPN+		at Idaho	L 76–78	6–18 (2–9)	19 – tied	7 – Brewer	3 – Nunn	ICCU Arena (1,972); Moscow, ID
February 13, 2025; 7:00 p.m., ESPN+		Northern Colorado	L 61–77	6–19 (2–10)	11 – Ricketts	9 – Holt	4 – tied	Hornets Nest (532); Sacramento, CA
February 15, 2025; 1:00 p.m., ESPN+		Northern Arizona	L 61–65	6–20 (2–11)	17 – Holt	13 – Holt	6 – Neal	Hornets Nest (810); Sacramento, CA
February 20, 2025; 6:00 p.m., ESPN+		at Weber State	W 80–77	7–20 (3–11)	27 – Holt	13 – Holt	7 – Nunn	Dee Events Center (2,196); Ogden, UT
February 22, 2025; 5:00 p.m., ESPN+		at Idaho State	L 66–83	7–21 (3–12)	17 – Holt	7 – Dioramma	5 – Nunn	Reed Gym (1,721); Pocatello, ID
February 27, 2025; 7:00 p.m., ESPN+		Montana	L 54–60	7–22 (3–13)	16 – Holt	9 – Holt	3 – tied	Hornets Nest (1,023); Sacramento, CA
March 1, 2025; 1:00 p.m., ESPN+		Montana State	L 60–87	7–23 (3–14)	24 – Holt	6 – tied	7 – Nunn	Hornets Nest (949); Sacramento, CA
March 3, 2025; 7:00 p.m., ESPN+		at Portland State	L 56–59	7–24 (3–15)	12 – Skytta	8 – Skytta	2 – tied	Viking Pavilion (1,167); Portland, OR
Big Sky tournament
March 8, 2025; 4:30 p.m., ESPN+	(10)	vs. (9) Weber State; First round	L 70–83	7–25	20 – Holt	4 – Holt	5 – Nunn	Idaho Central Arena; Boise, ID
*Non-conference game. ^{#}Rankings from AP poll. (#) Tournament seedings in parentheses. All times are in Pacific.
