= 2024–25 Northern Colorado Bears men's basketball team =

American college basketball season

2024–25 Northern Colorado Bears men's basketball
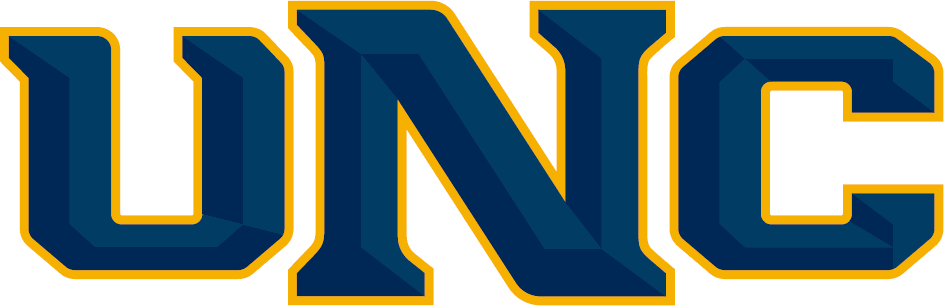

Big Sky regular season co-champions

NIT, First round
- Conference: Big Sky Conference
- Record: 25–10 (15–3 Big Sky)
- Head coach: Steve Smiley (5th season)
- Assistant coaches: Dorian Green; Houston Reed; Brett Cloepfil; Colin Gause; Dondrale Campbell
- Home arena: Bank of Colorado Arena

2024–25 Big Sky men's basketball standings
| | Conf. | | | | Overall |
| Team | W | | L | PCT | W | | L | PCT |
|---|---|---|---|---|---|---|---|---|
| Northern Colorado | 15 | – | 3 | .833 | 25 | – | 10 | .714 |
| Montana † | 15 | – | 3 | .833 | 25 | – | 10 | .714 |
| Portland State | 11 | – | 7 | .611 | 19 | – | 13 | .594 |
| Idaho State | 10 | – | 8 | .556 | 15 | – | 15 | .500 |
| Montana State | 9 | – | 9 | .500 | 15 | – | 18 | .455 |
| Idaho | 8 | – | 10 | .444 | 14 | – | 19 | .424 |
| Northern Arizona | 8 | – | 10 | .444 | 18 | – | 16 | .529 |
| Eastern Washington | 6 | – | 12 | .333 | 10 | – | 22 | .313 |
| Weber State | 5 | – | 13 | .278 | 12 | – | 22 | .353 |
| Sacramento State | 3 | – | 15 | .167 | 7 | – | 25 | .219 |
† 2025 Big Sky tournament winner

The 2024–25 Northern Colorado Bears men's basketball team represented the University of Northern Colorado during the 2024–25 NCAA Division I men's basketball season. The Bears, led by fifth-year head coach Steve Smiley, played their home games at the Bank of Colorado Arena in Greeley, Colorado as members of the Big Sky Conference.

== Previous season ==
The Bears finished the 2023–24 season 19–14, 12–6 in Big Sky play to finish in a tie for second place. They were upset by #8 seed Idaho State in the quarterfinals of the Big Sky tournament. They received an invitation to the CBI, receiving the #8 seed, where they would be defeated by Cleveland State in the first round.

== Offseason ==
=== Departures ===
Departures
| Name | Number | Pos. | Height | Weight | Year | Hometown | Notes |
|---|---|---|---|---|---|---|---|
| Saint Thomas | 0 | F | 6'7" | 200 | Junior | Omaha, Nebraska | Transferred to USC |
| Mekhi Cameron | 1 | G | 6'4" | 195 | Junior | Atlanta, Georgia | Transferred to Tennessee Tech |
| Dejour Reaves | 2 | G | 6'0" | 170 | Freshman | Syracuse, New York | Transferred to Iona |
| Connor Creech | 12 | G | 6'6" | 200 | (redshirt) Junior | Hastings, Nebraska | Graduated |
| Juju Ramirez | 15 | F | 6'9" | 220 | Sophomore | Lawrence, Kansas | Transferred to Saint Anselm |
| Riley Abercrombie | 22 | F | 6'9" | 220 | Graduate Student | Wollongong, Australia | Graduated |
| Jalen Page | 25 | G | 6'5" | 215 | (redshirt) Junior | Boulder, Colorado | Transferred to Regis |
| Theo Hughes | 32 | C | 7'0" | 260 | Senior | Brentwood, England | Graduated |

=== Incoming transfers ===
Incoming transfers
| Name | Number | Pos. | Height | Weight | Year | Hometown | Previous School |
|---|---|---|---|---|---|---|---|
| Taeshaud Jackson | 2 | G | 6'6" | 215 | Junior | Denver, Colorado | Virginia Military |
| Quinn Denker | 5 | G | 6'3" | 190 | Senior | San Jose, California | Idaho |
| William Humer | 21 | F | 6'10" | 235 | Junior | Sollentuna, Sweden | San Jose State |
| Isaiah Hawthorne | 23 | F | 6'8" | --- | Graduate Student | Tracy, California | San Francisco |
| Luca Colceag | 32 | F | 6'9" | 200 | Junior | Bucharest, Romania | Eastern Florida State College |

=== Recruiting class ===
College recruiting information
| Name | Hometown | School | Height | Weight | Commit date |
|---|---|---|---|---|---|
| Hunter Caldwell; C | Parker, Colorado | Lutheran High School | 6 ft 10 in (2.08 m) | 230 lb (100 kg) | Mar 29, 2024 |
| Hunter Caldwell; C | Recruit ratings: Scout: Rivals: 247Sports: (NR) | | | | |
| Viktor Lukic-Gavric; G | Stockholm, Sweden | Get Better Academy | 6 ft 2 in (1.88 m) | N/A | Apr 18, 2024 |
| Viktor Lukic-Gavric; G | Recruit ratings: Scout: Rivals: 247Sports: (NR) | | | | |
| Walker Asp; F | Colorado Springs, Colorado | Palmer High School | 6 ft 8 in (2.03 m) | 160 lb (73 kg) | May 5, 2024 |
| Walker Asp; F | Recruit ratings: Scout: Rivals: 247Sports: (NR) | | | | |
| Ariik Mawien; G | Sioux Falls, South Dakota | Link Academy | 6 ft 4 in (1.93 m) | 175 lb (79 kg) | May 17, 2024 |
| Ariik Mawien; G | Recruit ratings: Scout: Rivals: 247Sports: (NR) | | | | |
Overall recruit ranking:
Note: In many cases, Scout, Rivals, 247Sports, On3, and ESPN may conflict in their listings of height and weight.; In these cases, the average was taken. ESPN grades are on a 100-point scale.; Sources: "2024 Team Ranking". Rivals.

== Roster ==
2024–25 Northern Colorado Bears men's basketball team
Players
Coaches

| Pos. | # | Name | Height | Weight | Year | Previous school | Hometown |
|---|---|---|---|---|---|---|---|
| F | 0 | Walker Asp | 6 ft 8 in (2.03 m) | 160 lb (73 kg) | Fr | Palmer High School | Colorado Springs, Colorado |
| G | 2 | Taeshaud Jackson | 6 ft 6 in (1.98 m) | 215 lb (98 kg) | Jr | VMI | Denver, Colorado |
| G | 3 | Ariik Mawien | 6 ft 4 in (1.93 m) | 175 lb (79 kg) | Fr | Link Year Prep | Sioux Falls, South Dakota |
| C | 4 | Hunter Caldwell | 6 ft 10 in (2.08 m) | 230 lb (104 kg) | Fr | Lutheran High School | Parker, Colorado |
| G | 5 | Quinn Denker | 6 ft 3 in (1.91 m) | 190 lb (86 kg) | Sr | Idaho | San Jose, California |
| G | 6 | Langston Reynolds | 6 ft 4 in (1.93 m) | 205 lb (93 kg) | Jr | Colorado Prep | Denver, Colorado |
| G | 8 | Viktor Lukic-Gavric | 6 ft 2 in (1.88 m) | — | Fr | Get Better Academy | Stockholm, Sweden |
| G | 9 | Jaron Rillie | 6 ft 3 in (1.91 m) | 185 lb (84 kg) | GS | Samford | Sydney, Australia |
| G | 10 | Radek Homer | 6 ft 2 in (1.88 m) | 185 lb (84 kg) | Fr | Mountain Vista High School | Highlands Ranch, Colorado |
| G | 11 | Zach Bloch | 6 ft 2 in (1.88 m) | 185 lb (84 kg) | Sr | Colorado Prep | Lawrence, Kansas |
| F | 14 | Brock Wisne | 6 ft 9 in (2.06 m) | 245 lb (111 kg) | Jr | Colorado Prep | Thornton, Colorado |
| F | 21 | William Humer | 6 ft 10 in (2.08 m) | 235 lb (107 kg) | Jr | San Jose State | Sollentuna, Sweden |
| F | 23 | Isaiah Hawthorne | 6 ft 8 in (2.03 m) | 205 lb (93 kg) | GS | San Francisco | Tracy, California |
| F | 32 | Luca Colceag | 6 ft 9 in (2.06 m) | 200 lb (91 kg) | Jr | Eastern Florida State College | Bucharest, Romania |
| C | 33 | Egan Shields | 6 ft 10 in (2.08 m) | 250 lb (113 kg) | Fr | Colorado Prep | Ashland, Oregon |
| G | 42 | Marcell McCreary | 6 ft 4 in (1.93 m) | 223 lb (101 kg) | Jr | Air Force | Fort Worth, Texas |

Head coach

- Steve Smiley (Northern State)

Assistant coach(es)

- Dorian Green (Colorado State)
- Houston Reed (Northern State)
- Brett Cloepfil (CSU Pueblo)
- Colin Gause (Northern Colorado)
- Dondrale Campbell (Greenville)

Legend

- (C) Team captain
- (S) Suspended
- (I) Ineligible
- (W) Walk-on
- Injured
- Current redshirt

Roster
Last update: October 15, 2024

== Schedule and results ==
| Date time, TV | Rank^{#} | Opponent^{#} | Result | Record | High points | High rebounds | High assists | Site (attendance) city, state |
Non-conference regular season
| November 4, 2024*; 8:00 pm, ESPN+ | | Colorado College | W 75–55 | 1–0 | 21 – Reynolds | 10 – Rillie | 5 – Rillie | Bank of Colorado Arena (1,120); Greeley, CO |
| November 8, 2024*; 7:00 pm, ESPN+ | | at Colorado | L 88–90 ^{2OT} | 1–1 | 19 – Hawthorne | 8 – Rillie | 7 – Rillie | CU Events Center (6,152); Boulder, CO |
| November 12, 2024*; 6:00 pm, ESPN+ | | Colorado Christian | W 113–56 | 2–1 | 24 – Hawthorne | 7 – McCreary | 6 – Reynolds | Bank of Colorado Arena (995); Greeley, CO |
| November 14, 2024*; 8:00 pm, SLN | | vs. South Dakota State | W 78–69 | 3–1 | 21 – Hawthorne | 8 – Rillie | 5 – Rillie | Summit Arena (4,887); Rapid City, SD |
| November 18, 2024*; 7:30 pm, ESPN+ | | at Washington State; Acrisure Holiday Invitational campus game | L 69–83 | 3–2 | 16 – Reynolds | 10 – Hawthorne | 4 – Rillie | Beasley Coliseum (3,066); Pullman, WA |
| November 20, 2024*; 7:30 pm, ESPN+ | | at California Baptist; Acrisure Holiday Invitational campus game | W 79–68 | 4–2 | 18 – Reynolds | 12 – Hawthorne | 8 – Rillie | Fowler Events Center (2,737); Riverside, CA |
| November 23, 2024*; 6:00 pm, ESPN+ | | Prairie View A&M; Acrisure Holiday Invitational campus game | W 114–98 | 5–2 | 31 – Reynolds | 7 – Rillie | 7 – Tied | Bank of Colorado Arena (1,102); Greeley, CO |
| November 26, 2024*; 6:00 pm, ESPN+ | | Northern New Mexico | W 92–50 | 6–2 | 27 – Hawthorne | 5 – Wisne | 5 – Reynolds | Bank of Colorado Arena (901); Greeley, CO |
| November 29, 2024*; 7:00 pm, ESPN+ | | at Texas Tech | L 64–89 | 6–3 | 16 – Denker | 4 – Tied | 4 – Reynolds | United Supermarkets Arena (13,274); Lubbock, TX |
| December 4, 2024*; 6:00 pm, ESPN+ | | St. Thomas; Big Sky-Summit Challenge | L 75–87 | 6–4 | 20 – Hawthorne | 8 – Reynolds | 4 – Rillie | Bank of Colorado Arena (1,020); Greeley, CO |
| December 7, 2024*; 6:00 pm | | at North Dakota State; Big Sky-Summit Challenge | L 70–82 | 6–5 | 19 – Hawthorne | 10 – Hawthorne | 3 – Denker | Scheels Center (1,242); Fargo, ND |
| December 16, 2024*; 6:00 pm, ESPN+ | | Air Force | W 81–76 | 7–5 | 23 – Reynolds | 11 – Reynolds | 7 – Rillie | Bank of Colorado Arena (1,183); Greeley, CO |
| December 21, 2024*; 1:00 pm, Altitude/MidcoS | | at Denver | W 82–75 | 8–5 | 22 – Wisne | 5 – Tied | 5 – Tied | Hamilton Gymnasium (1,148); Denver, CO |
Big Sky regular season
| January 2, 2025; 6:00 pm, ESPN+ | | Weber State | W 89–72 | 9–5 (1–0) | 17 – Hawthorne | 7 – Reynolds | 5 – Tied | Bank of Colorado Arena (1,006); Greeley, CO |
| January 4, 2025; 2:00 pm, ESPN+ | | Idaho State | W 93–92 ^{OT} | 10–5 (2–0) | 27 – Reynolds | 7 – Rillie | 8 – Tied | Bank of Colorado Arena (1,055); Greeley, CO |
| January 9, 2025; 7:00 pm, ESPN+ | | at Montana State | W 83–82 | 11–5 (3–0) | 21 – McCreary | 9 – Hawthorne | 7 – Rillie | Worthington Arena (2,367); Bozeman, MT |
| January 11, 2025; 4:00 pm, ESPN+ | | at Montana | W 81–57 | 12–5 (4–0) | 19 – Wisne | 15 – Reynolds | 7 – Rillie | Dahlberg Arena (3,184); Missoula, MT |
| January 16, 2025; 6:00 pm, ESPN+ | | Portland State | W 72–69 | 13–5 (5–0) | 23 – Hawthorne | 7 – Hawthorne | 4 – Tied | Bank of Colorado Arena (1,208); Greeley, CO |
| January 18, 2025; 6:00 pm, ESPN+ | | Sacramento State | W 68–64 | 14–5 (6–0) | 17 – Hawthorne | 7 – Reynolds | 3 – Tied | Bank of Colorado Arena (1,521); Greeley, CO |
| January 23, 2025; 7:00 pm, ESPN+ | | at Idaho | L 76–77 | 14–6 (6–1) | 22 – Reynolds | 7 – Wisne | 3 – Tied | ICCU Arena (1,716); Moscow, ID |
| January 25, 2025; 3:00 pm, ESPN+ | | at Eastern Washington | W 67–62 | 15–6 (7–1) | 32 – Hawthorne | 7 – Hawthorne | 4 – Reynolds | Reese Court (1,600); Cheney, WA |
| February 1, 2025; 2:00 pm, ESPN+ | | Northern Arizona | W 87–69 | 16–6 (8–1) | 23 – Reynolds | 9 – Reynolds | 6 – Rillie | Bank of Colorado Arena (1,653); Greeley, CO |
| February 3, 2025; 7:00 pm, ESPN+ | | at Idaho State | W 86–72 | 17–6 (9–1) | 19 – Tied | 12 – Reynolds | 8 – Rillie | Reed Gym (1,481); Pocatello, ID |
| February 6, 2025; 6:00 pm, ESPN+ | | Montana | L 78–86 | 17–7 (9–2) | 21 – Denker | 7 – Hawthorne | 6 – Reynolds | Bank of Colorado Arena (2,001); Greeley, CO |
| February 8, 2025; 6:00 pm, ESPN+ | | Montana State | W 73–66 | 18–7 (10–2) | 17 – Denker | 11 – Wisne | 8 – Rillie | Bank of Colorado Arena (1,672); Greeley, CO |
| February 13, 2025; 7:00 pm, ESPN+ | | at Sacramento State | W 77–61 | 19–7 (11–2) | 24 – Hawthorne | 8 – Hawthorne | 4 – Reynolds | Hornets Nest (532); Sacramento, CA |
| February 15, 2025; 2:00 pm, ESPN+ | | at Portland State | L 71–82 | 19–8 (11–3) | 19 – Tied | 8 – Hawthorne | 4 – Rillie | Viking Pavilion (777); Portland, OR |
| February 20, 2025; 6:00 pm, ESPN+ | | Eastern Washington | W 95–76 | 20–8 (12–3) | 23 – Rillie | 10 – Rillie | 5 – Rillie | Bank of Colorado Arena (1,356); Greeley, CO |
| February 22, 2025; 6:00 pm, ESPN+ | | Idaho | W 92–74 | 21–8 (13–3) | 25 – Hawthorne | 6 – Wisne | 5 – Reynolds | Bank of Colorado Arena (2,004); Greeley, CO |
| March 1, 2025; 2:00 pm, ESPN+ | | at Northern Arizona | W 83–73 | 22–8 (14–3) | 20 – Tied | 7 – Rillie | 4 – McCreary | Findlay Toyota Court (1,389); Flagstaff, AZ |
| March 3, 2025; 7:00 pm, ESPN+ | | at Weber State | W 68–63 | 23–8 (15–3) | 24 – Rillie | 8 – Rillie | 3 – Tied | Dee Events Center (2,633); Ogden, UT |
Big Sky tournament
| March 9, 2025; 5:30 pm, ESPN+ | (1) | vs. (9) Weber State; Quarterfinals | W 76–52 | 24–8 | 29 – Hawthorne | 9 – Rillie | 6 – Rillie | Idaho Central Arena; Boise, ID |
| March 11, 2025; 7:00 pm, ESPNU | (1) | vs. (5) Montana State; Semifinals | W 72–45 | 25–8 | 13 – Rillie | 9 – McCreary | 4 – Denker | Idaho Central Arena; Boise, ID |
| March 12, 2025; 9:30 pm, ESPN2 | (1) | vs. (2) Montana; Championship | L 83–91 | 25–9 | 24 – Rillie | 4 – Rillie | 6 – Rillie | Idaho Central Arena; Boise, ID |
NIT
| March 19, 2025; 8:00 p.m., ESPN+ | | at (1) UC Irvine; First round – Irvine Region | L 72–82 | 25–10 | 16 – Wisne | 12 – Hawthorne | 5 – Reynolds | Bren Events Center (1,241); Irvine, CA |
*Non-conference game. ^{#}Rankings from AP Poll. (#) Tournament seedings in parentheses. All times are in Mountain.
