= 2024–25 Idaho Vandals men's basketball team =

American college basketball season

2024–25 Idaho Vandals men's basketball
- Conference: Big Sky Conference
- Record: 14–19 (8–10 Big Sky)
- Head coach: Alex Pribble (2nd season)
- Associate head coach: Brandon Laird
- Assistant coaches: Matt Jones; Markhuri Sanders-Frison; Adam Ellis
- Home arena: ICCU Arena

2024–25 Big Sky men's basketball standings
	Conf.				Overall
Team	W		L	PCT	W		L	PCT
Northern Colorado	15	–	3	.833	25	–	10	.714
Montana †	15	–	3	.833	25	–	10	.714
Portland State	11	–	7	.611	19	–	13	.594
Idaho State	10	–	8	.556	15	–	15	.500
Montana State	9	–	9	.500	15	–	18	.455
Idaho	8	–	10	.444	14	–	19	.424
Northern Arizona	8	–	10	.444	18	–	16	.529
Eastern Washington	6	–	12	.333	10	–	22	.313
Weber State	5	–	13	.278	12	–	22	.353
Sacramento State	3	–	15	.167	7	–	25	.219
† 2025 Big Sky tournament winner

The 2024–25 Idaho Vandals men's basketball team represented the University of Idaho during the 2024–25 NCAA Division I men's basketball season. The Vandals, led by second-year head coach Alex Pribble, played their home games at Idaho Central Credit Union Arena in Moscow, Idaho as members of the Big Sky Conference.

== Previous season ==
The Vandals finished the 2023–24 season 11–21, 5–13 in Big Sky play, to finish in ninth place. They were defeated by Sacramento State in the first round of the Big Sky tournament.

== Offseason ==
=== Departures ===
Departures
Name	Number	Pos.	Height	Weight	Year	Hometown	Notes
Quinn Denker	3	G	6' 3"	195	Junior	San Jose, CA	Transferred to Northern Colorado
EJ Neal	4	G	6' 5"	200	Junior	San Francisco, CA	Transferred to Sacramento State
D'Angelo Minnis	5	G	5' 10"	170	Senior	Kent, WA	Graduated
Terren Frank	15	F	6' 8"	230	(redshirt) Junior	Los Angeles, CA	Transferred to Campbell
Cooper Church	32	F	6' 9"	215	Sophomore	Maple Valley, WA	

=== Incoming transfers ===
Incoming transfers
Name	Number	Pos.	Height	Weight	Year	Hometown	Previous school
Jojo Anderson	3	G	6' 0"	180	(redshirt) Junior	Spokane, WA	Whitworth
Jayden Stevens	4	F	6' 7"	190	Junior	Spokane, WA	Oregon State
Isaiah Brickner	5	G	6' 4"	190	Junior	San Diego, CA	Marist
Jack Payne	7	G	6' 6"	195	(redshirt) Sophomore	Boise, ID	Colorado State
Kolton Mitchell	14	G	6' 1"	--	(redshirt) Freshman	Coeur d'Alene, ID	Idaho State

=== Recruiting class ===
College recruiting information
Name	Hometown	School	Height	Weight	Commit date
Ewan Steele; F	Alton, ON	Polaris Prep	6 ft 9 in (2.06 m)	N/A	May 27, 2024
Ewan Steele; F	Recruit ratings: Scout: Rivals: 247Sports: (NR)				
Overall recruit ranking:
Note: In many cases, Scout, Rivals, 247Sports, On3, and ESPN may conflict in their listings of height and weight.; In these cases, the average was taken. ESPN grades are on a 100-point scale.; Sources: "2024 Team Ranking". Rivals.

== Roster ==
2024–25 Idaho Vandals men's basketball team
Players
Coaches

Pos.	#	Name	Height	Weight	Year	Previous school	Hometown
F	0	Julius Mims	6 ft 9 in (2.06 m)	190 lb (86 kg)	Sr	North Idaho College	Billings, MT
G	1	Trevon Blassingame	6 ft 4 in (1.93 m)	180 lb (82 kg)	Jr	Fairleigh Dickinson	Auburn, WA
F	2	Tyler Mrus	6 ft 7 in (2.01 m)	205 lb (93 kg)	RS So	Alaska	Bothell, WA
G	3	Jojo Anderson	6 ft 0 in (1.83 m)	180 lb (82 kg)	RS Jr	Whitworth	Spokane, WA
F	4	Jayden Stevens	6 ft 7 in (2.01 m)	190 lb (86 kg)	Jr	Oregon State	Spokane, WA
G	5	Isaiah Brickner	6 ft 4 in (1.93 m)	190 lb (86 kg)	Jr	Marist	San Diego, CA
G	7	Jack Payne	6 ft 6 in (1.98 m)	195 lb (88 kg)	RS So	Colorado State	Boise, ID
G	10	Kristian Gonzalez	6 ft 3 in (1.91 m)	180 lb (82 kg)	So	Mater Dei Catholic High School	Chula Vista, CA
G	11	Titus Yearout	6 ft 2 in (1.88 m)	180 lb (82 kg)	RS So	Lapwai High School	Lapwai, ID
G	14	Kolton Mitchell	6 ft 1 in (1.85 m)	175 lb (79 kg)	RS Fr	Idaho State	Coeur d'Alene, ID
F	15	Ewan Steele	6 ft 9 in (2.06 m)	—	Fr	Polaris Prep	Alton, ON
F	22	Tyler Linhardt	6 ft 7 in (2.01 m)	220 lb (100 kg)	Jr	Washington	Seattle, WA
F	23	Takai Hardy	6 ft 7 in (2.01 m)	220 lb (100 kg)	So	Sunrise Christian Academy	Fairfield, CA
G	24	Miles Klapper	6 ft 3 in (1.91 m)	185 lb (84 kg)	RS Fr	Bridgton Academy	Hillsborough, CA
G	33	Jack Hatten	6 ft 6 in (1.98 m)	200 lb (91 kg)	RS Jr	Garces Memorial High School	Bakersfield, CA
F	34	Kyson Rose	6 ft 9 in (2.06 m)	245 lb (111 kg)	Sr	Walla Walla Community College	Kennewick, WA

Head coach

- Alex Pribble (California)

Assistant coach(es)

- Brandon Laird (UC Davis)
- Matt Jones (Trinity (TX))
- Markhuri Sanders-Frison (California)
- Adam Ellis (Eastern Washington)

Legend

- (C) Team captain
- (S) Suspended
- (I) Ineligible
- (W) Walk-on
- Injured
- Current redshirt

Roster
Last update: October 13, 2024

== Schedule and results ==
Date time, TV	Rank^{#}	Opponent^{#}	Result	Record	High points	High rebounds	High assists	Site (attendance) city, state
Non-conference regular season
November 4, 2024*; 6:00 p.m., ESPN+		Northwest	W 94–60	1–0	20 – Brickner	8 – tied	3 – tied	ICCU Arena (1,584); Moscow, ID
November 7, 2024*; 7:30 p.m., ESPN+		UC Davis	L 75–79	1–1	17 – Mrus	8 – Gonzalez	3 – tied	ICCU Arena (1,736); Moscow, ID
November 11, 2024*; 6:30 p.m., ESPN+		at Washington State; Battle of the Palouse	L 67–90	1–2	13 – Brickner	11 – Mims	3 – Mitchell	Beasley Coliseum (3,838); Pullman, WA
November 16, 2024*; 1:00 p.m., ESPN+		at BYU	L 71–95	1–3	17 – Mrus	6 – Mims	4 – Anderson	Marriott Center (16,456); Provo, UT
November 19, 2024*; 6:00 p.m., ESPN+		Evergreen State	W 101–58	2–3	21 – tied	10 – Payne	8 – Anderson	ICCU Arena (1,583); Moscow, ID
November 23, 2024*; 2:00 p.m.		vs. Southern Utah; San Diego MTE	L 67–82	2–4	14 – Rose	5 – Mims	3 – tied	Jenny Craig Pavilion (148); San Diego, CA
November 24, 2024*; 2:00 p.m., ESPN+		at San Diego; San Diego MTE	L 61–68	2–5	13 – Mitchell	6 – tied	3 – Mitchell	Jenny Craig Pavilion (507); San Diego, CA
November 30, 2024*; 2:00 p.m., ESPN+		UC Riverside	W 80–68	3–5	25 – Gonzalez	7 – Rose	5 – tied	ICCU Arena (1,567); Moscow, ID
December 4, 2024*; 5:00 p.m.		at Kansas City; Big Sky–Summit Challenge	W 82–77	4–5	17 – Payne	8 – Payne	4 – tied	Swinney Recreation Center (792); Kansas City, MO
December 7, 2024*; 2:00 p.m., ESPN+		at Oregon State	L 62–78	4–6	15 – Mrus	7 – Steele	3 – Anderson	Gill Coliseum (3,042); Corvallis, OR
December 15, 2024*; 4:00 p.m., ESPN+		UC San Diego	L 56–80	4–7	20 – Mrus	8 – Steele	3 – Mitchell	ICCU Arena (1.410); Moscow, ID
December 18, 2024*; 6:00 p.m., ESPN+		at UC Davis	L 66–74	4–8	26 – Mitchell	10 – Hardy	2 – tied	University Credit Union Center (875); Davis, CA
December 21, 2024*; 1:00 p.m., ESPN+		at Pacific	W 95–72	5–8	32 – Mitchell	11 – Payne	8 – Payne	Alex G. Spanos Center (1,222); Stockton, CA
Big Sky regular season
January 2, 2025; 6:00 p.m., ESPN+		Montana State	W 69–64	6–8 (1–0)	14 – tied	9 – Mims	6 – Mitchell	ICCU Arena (1,666); Moscow, ID
January 4, 2025; 2:00 p.m., ESPN+		Montana	L 71–73	6–9 (1–1)	19 – Gonzalez	8 – Mims	3 – Payne	ICCU Arena (1,816); Moscow, ID
January 9, 2025; 7:00 p.m., ESPN+		at Sacramento State	W 80–67	7–9 (2–1)	23 – Payne	5 – tied	5 – Mitchell	Hornets Nest (587); Sacramento, CA
January 11, 2025; 2:00 p.m., ESPN+		at Portland State	L 63–75	7–10 (2–2)	15 – Payne	7 – Payne	7 – Mitchell	Viking Pavilion (835); Portland, OR
January 18, 2025; 4:00 p.m., ESPN+		Eastern Washington	W 83–76	8–10 (3–2)	20 – Gonzalez	6 – tied	5 – Payne	ICCU Arena (2,485); Moscow, ID
January 20, 2025; 6:00 p.m., ESPN+		at Montana	L 67–72	8–11 (3–3)	12 – Mrus	6 – Mims	7 – Anderson	Dahlberg Arena (2,438); Missoula, MT
January 23, 2025; 6:00 p.m., ESPN+		Northern Colorado	W 77–76	9–11 (4–3)	25 – Mitchell	5 – Mims	2 – Gonzalez	ICCU Arena (1,716); Moscow, ID
January 25, 2025; 12:00 p.m., ESPN+		Northern Arizona	L 72–80	9–12 (4–4)	20 – Payne	8 – Mitchell	7 – Mitchell	ICCU Arena (1,979); Moscow, ID
January 30, 2025; 6:00 p.m., ESPN+		at Weber State	W 82–74	10–12 (5–4)	21 – Mrus	7 – Mims	4 – Payne	Dee Events Center (3,449); Ogden, UT
February 1, 2025; 1:00 p.m., ESPN+		at Idaho State; Battle of the Domes	L 71–87	10–13 (5–5)	17 – Mitchell	3 – tied	2 – tied	Reed Gym (1,729); Pocatello, ID
February 6, 2025; 6:00 p.m., ESPN+		Portland State	L 69–76	10–14 (5–6)	14 – Yearout	7 – Mrus	4 – Mitchell	ICCU Arena (1,676); Moscow, ID
February 8, 2025; 2:00 p.m., ESPN+		Sacramento State	W 78–76	11–14 (6–6)	21 – Payne	6 – tied	5 – Mitchell	ICCU Arena (1,972); Moscow, ID
February 15, 2025; 4:00 p.m., ESPN+		at Eastern Washington	L 73–75	11–15 (6–7)	17 – Brickner	8 – Mims	7 – Mitchell	Reese Court (1,989); Cheney, WA
February 20, 2025; 6:00 p.m., ESPN+		at Northern Arizona	W 83–78	12–15 (7–7)	25 – Linhardt	9 – Payne	4 – Payne	Findlay Toyota Court (702); Flagstaff, AZ
February 22, 2025; 6:00 p.m., ESPN+		at Northern Colorado	L 74–92	12–16 (7–8)	23 – Linhardt	5 – Mims	3 – Payne	Bank of Colorado Arena (2,004); Greeley, CO
February 27, 2025; 6:00 p.m., ESPN+		Idaho State; Battle of the Domes	L 65–69	12–17 (7–9)	18 – Payne	13 – Mims	5 – Mitchell	ICCU Arena (2,315); Moscow, ID
March 1, 2025; 2:00 p.m., ESPN+		Weber State	W 81–79 ^{OT}	13–17 (8–9)	22 – Mrus	13 – Mims	5 – Mitchell	ICCU Arena (2,262); Moscow, ID
March 3, 2025; 6:00 p.m., ESPN+		at Montana State	L 60–75	13–18 (8–10)	15 – Yearout	7 – Mims	2 – tied	Worthington Arena (3,060); Bozeman, MT
Big Sky tournament
March 10, 2025; 8:00 pm, ESPN+	(6)	vs. (3) Portland State; Quarterfinals	W 80–70	14–18	24 – Gonzalez	9 – Mims	7 – Mitchell	Idaho Central Arena; Boise, ID
March 11, 2025; 8:30 pm, ESPN2	(6)	vs. (2) Montana; Semifinals	L 55–78	14–19	18 – Payne	7 – Mims	2 – Brickner	Idaho Central Arena; Boise, ID
*Non-conference game. ^{#}Rankings from AP poll. (#) Tournament seedings in parentheses. All times are in Pacific time.
