= Travis DeCuire =

American basketball player and coach (born 1970)

Current position
- Title: Head coach
- Team: Montana
- Conference: Big Sky
- Record: 243–152 (.615)

Biographical details
- Born: November 21, 1970 (age 55); Seattle, Washington, U.S.

Playing career
- 1991–1994: Montana

Coaching career (HC unless noted)
- 1998–2001: Sammamish HS (WA)
- 2001–2003: Green River CC
- 2003–2008: Old Dominion (assistant)
- 2008–2014: California (assistant)
- 2014–present: Montana

Head coaching record
- Overall: 277–175 (.613) (college)
- Tournaments: 0–3 (NCAA DI); 0–1 (NIT); 1–2 (CBI)

Accomplishments and honors

Championships
- NWAC regular season (2003); 4 Big Sky regular season (2015, 2018, 2019, 2025); 3 Big Sky tournament (2018, 2019, 2025)

Awards
- 2× Big Sky Coach of the Year (2018, 2025)

Travis Lamont DeCuire (born November 21, 1970) is the men's basketball head coach for the University of Montana.

== Biography ==
DeCuire went to Mercer Island High School, where he led the school to two conference titles. He began his collegiate career at Chaminade, where he was a starter his freshman year. DeCuire played college basketball for Montana from 1991 to 1994. He set school career and single-season assists records with 435 and 199 assists, respectively, for the Grizzles. DeCuire was named to All-Big Sky teams in his junior and senior seasons. He graduated from Montana in 1994 with a degree in marketing.

After graduation, DeCuire founded the Fastbreak Basketball Association to help Seattle area youth learn life lessons through basketball. He has counseled students at the Echo Glen Children's Center in Snoqualmie, Washington, from 1996 to 1998 and with the Ryther Children's Center in Seattle from 1995 to 1997. DeCuire served as head coach of Green River Community College for two seasons from 2001 to 2003. He earned league Coach of the Year honors in 2003. DeCuire left to join Blaine Taylor's staff at Old Dominion University, where he served until 2008. He helped lead the Monarchs to two NCAA Tournament berths. DeCuire was an assistant coach at the University of California for six seasons, from 2008 to 2014.

On May 31, 2014, DeCuire was hired as head coach of his alma mater, Montana. He replaced Wayne Tinkle, who left to take the job at Oregon State University. "I am excited to have Travis return to the University of Montana and lead the Griz men's basketball program," said athletic director Kent Haslam. "I identified Travis as a very strong candidate early in the search process. The more time I spent with him understanding his vision not only for our program, but for the student-athletes he will mentor, the more impressed I became with him as a person and a coach."

DeCuire was named Big Sky Coach of the Year in 2018 after leading the team to a 23–7 regular season record and Big Sky Championship title.

== Head coaching record ==
Record table
Season	Team	Overall	Conference	Standing	Postseason
Green River Gators (Northwest Athletic Conference) (2001–2003)
2001–02	Green River CC	14–13	6–10	7th	
2002–03	Green River CC	20–10	14–2	1st	
Green River CC:		34–23 (.596)	20–12 (.625)		
Montana Grizzlies (Big Sky Conference) (2014–present)
2014–15	Montana	20–13	14–4	T–1st	NIT first round
2015–16	Montana	21–12	14–4	2nd	CBI first round
2016–17	Montana	16–16	11–7	T–5th	
2017–18	Montana	26–8	16–2	1st	NCAA Division I Round of 64
2018–19	Montana	26–9	16–4	1st	NCAA Division I Round of 64
2019–20	Montana	18–13	14–6	3rd	
2020–21	Montana	15–13	7–9	6th	
2021–22	Montana	18–14	11–9	T–5th	
2022–23	Montana	17–14	10–7	4th	
2023–24	Montana	24–12	12–6	T–2nd	CBI Quarterfinals
2024–25	Montana	25–10	15–3	T–1st	NCAA Division I Round of 64
2025–26	Montana	18–16	10–8	T–4th	
2026–27	Montana	2–3	0–0		
Montana:		243–152 (.615)	150–69 (.685)		
Total:		277–175 (.613)			
National champion Postseason invitational champion Conference regular season champion Conference regular season and conference tournament champion Division regular season champion Division regular season and conference tournament champion Conference tournament champion
