= Eric Duft =

American basketball coach

Current position
- Title: President of Basketball Operations and Development
- Team: Weber State
- Conference: Big Sky

Biographical details
- Born: December 26, 1972 (age 53); Sterling, Kansas, U.S.

Playing career
- 1991–1995: Sterling (KS)

Coaching career (HC unless noted)
- 1995–1997: Central CC (KS) (assistant)
- 1997–1998: Central CC (KS)
- 1998–1999: Cowley CC (assistant)
- 1999–2006: Hutchinson CC (assistant)
- 2006–2022: Weber State (assistant)
- 2022–2026: Weber State

Head coaching record
- Overall: 66–65 (.504)

Eric Preston Duft (born December 26, 1972) is an American basketball coach who recently served as head coach of the Weber State Wildcats men's basketball team.

== Playing career ==
After playing at Sterling High School in Kansas, Duft would continue his college playing career at local Sterling College, where he played four seasons of basketball.

== Coaching career ==
Duft's first coaching position came at Central Community College in Kansas as an assistant coach for two seasons, before spending a lone season as the team's head coach. He'd then move on to an assistant coaching position at Cowley Community College, before spending the next seven seasons as an assistant coach at Hutchinson Community College, where he worked under former Utah State head coach Tim Duryea.

In 2006, he was hired as an assistant coach under Randy Rahe at Weber State, and remained on staff through Rahe's entire coaching tenure, which included three NCAA tournament appearances and five Big Sky Conference regular season titles. After Rahe announced his retirement on May 17, 2022, Duft was promoted to head coach two days later, making him the 10th head coach in Weber State basketball history. On March 12, 2026, Weber State reassigned Duft to a new role as President of Basketball Operations and Development for the program.

== Head coaching record ==
=== NCAA ===
Record table
Season	Team	Overall	Conference	Standing	Postseason
Weber State Wildcats (Big Sky Conference) (2022–2026)
2022–23	Weber State	18–15	12–6	3rd	
2023–24	Weber State	20–12	11–7	4th	
2024–25	Weber State	12–22	5–13	9th	
2025–26	Weber State	16–16	10–8	T–4th	
Weber State:		66–65 (.504)	38–34 (.528)		
Total:		66–65 (.504)			
National champion Postseason invitational champion Conference regular season champion Conference regular season and conference tournament champion Division regular season champion Division regular season and conference tournament champion Conference tournament champion
