= 2025 Summit League men's basketball tournament =

American college basketball postseason tournament

- Classification: Division I
- Season: 2024–25
- Teams: 9
- Site: Denny Sanford Premier Center; Sioux Falls, South Dakota
- Champions: Omaha (1st title)
- Winning coach: Chris Crutchfield (1st title)
- MVP: Marquel Sutton (Omaha)
- Attendance: 34,875 (total); 7,597 (championship)
- Television: CBSSN, MidcoSN, SLN

2024–25 Summit League men's basketball standings
| | Conf. | | | | Overall |
| Team | W | | L | PCT | W | | L | PCT |
|---|---|---|---|---|---|---|---|---|
| Omaha † | 13 | – | 3 | .813 | 22 | – | 13 | .629 |
| St. Thomas * | 12 | – | 4 | .750 | 24 | – | 10 | .706 |
| South Dakota State | 11 | – | 5 | .688 | 20 | – | 12 | .625 |
| North Dakota State | 10 | – | 6 | .625 | 21 | – | 11 | .656 |
| South Dakota | 9 | – | 7 | .563 | 19 | – | 14 | .576 |
| North Dakota | 5 | – | 11 | .313 | 12 | – | 21 | .364 |
| Denver | 5 | – | 11 | .313 | 11 | – | 21 | .344 |
| Kansas City | 4 | – | 12 | .250 | 13 | – | 20 | .394 |
| Oral Roberts | 3 | – | 13 | .188 | 7 | – | 23 | .233 |
† 2025 Summit League tournament winner * Ineligible for the 2025 NCAA tournament due to transition from Division III

The 2025 Summit League men's basketball tournament was the postseason men's basketball tournament for the Summit League for the 2024–25 season. All tournament games were played at the Denny Sanford Premier Center in Sioux Falls, South Dakota, from March 5–9, 2025.

Omaha clinched the Summit League's automatic bid to the NCAA tournament, after both the Mavericks and St. Thomas both won their tournament semifinal games, since St. Thomas was ineligible for NCAA postseason play as a team transitioning from Division III. The matchup between Omaha and St. Thomas in the Summit League championship marked the first ever appearance in a Division I conference tournament championship game for both teams. Omaha defeated St. Thomas in that matchup to secure their first ever Summit League championship.

== Seeds ==
All nine conference teams participated in the tournament. Teams were seeded by record within the conference, with a tiebreaker system to seed teams with identical conference records. The tiebreakers operated in the following order:

1. Head-to-head record
2. Record against the top-seeded team not involved in the tie, going down through the standings until the tie is broken

Since St. Thomas was ineligible for the NCAA tournament, if they had won the Summit League tournament, the conference's automatic bid would have been awarded to Omaha as the highest seeded postseason-eligible team.

| Seed | School | League Record | Tiebreaker(s) |
|---|---|---|---|
| 1 | Omaha | 13–3 | |
| 2 | St. Thomas | 12–4 | |
| 3 | South Dakota State | 11–5 | |
| 4 | North Dakota State | 10–6 | |
| 5 | South Dakota | 9–7 | |
| 6 | North Dakota | 5–11 | 1–1 vs. North Dakota State |
| 7 | Denver | 5–11 | 0–2 vs. North Dakota State |
| 8 | Kansas City | 4–12 | |
| 9 | Oral Roberts | 3–13 | |

== Schedule and results ==
| Game | Time | Matchup | Score | Television | Attendance |
First Round – Wednesday, March 5
| 1 | 7:00 pm | No. 8 Kansas City vs. No. 9 Oral Roberts | 73–56 | MidcoSN/ SLN | 3,917 |
Quarterfinals – Thursday, March 6
| 2 | 6:00 pm | No. 1 Omaha vs. No. 8 Kansas City | 70–61 | MidcoSN/ SLN | 5,814 |
| 3 | 8:30 pm | No. 2 St. Thomas vs. No. 7 Denver | 80–62 | MidcoSN/ SLN | 5,814 |
Quarterfinals – Friday, March 7
| 4 | 6:00 pm | No. 4 North Dakota State vs. No. 5 South Dakota | 84–85 | MidcoSN/ SLN | 9,202 |
| 5 | 8:30 pm | No. 3 South Dakota State vs. No. 6 North Dakota | 69–85 | MidcoSN/ SLN | 9,202 |
Semifinals - Saturday, March 8
| 6 | 7:00 pm | No. 1 Omaha vs. No. 5 South Dakota | 100–75 | CBSSN | 8,345 |
| 7 | 9:47 pm | No. 2 St. Thomas vs. No. 6 North Dakota | 85–69 | CBSSN | 8,345 |
Championship – Sunday, March 9
| 8 | 8:00 pm | No. 1 Omaha vs. No. 2 St. Thomas | 85–75 | CBSSN | 7,597 |
*Game times in CST through the semifinals and CDT for the final. Rankings denote tournament seed. Reference:

== Bracket ==
First Round; March 5 MidcoSN/SLN
8 | Kansas City | 73
9 | Oral Roberts | 56

Quarterfinals; March 6 & 7 MidcoSN/SLN
1 | Omaha | 70
8 | Kansas City | 61
4 | North Dakota State | 84
5 | South Dakota | 85
2 | St. Thomas | 80
7 | Denver | 62
3 | South Dakota State | 69
6 | North Dakota | 85

Semifinals; March 8 CBSSN
1 | Omaha | 100
5 | South Dakota | 75
2 | St. Thomas | 85
6 | North Dakota | 69

Final; March 9 CBSSN
1 | Omaha | 85
2 | St. Thomas | 75

== All-Tournament Team ==
The following players were named to the All-Tournament Team:

| Player | School |
|---|---|
| Marquel Sutton (MVP) | Omaha |
| JJ White | Omaha |
| Miles Barnstable | St. Thomas |
| Kendall Blue | St. Thomas |
| Treysen Eaglestaff | North Dakota |

== See also ==
- 2025 Summit League women's basketball tournament
