= 2024–25 Omaha Mavericks men's basketball team =

American college basketball season

2024–25 Omaha Mavericks men's basketball

Summit League regular season & tournament champions

NCAA tournament, First Round
- Conference: Summit League
- Record: 22–13 (13–3 Summit)
- Head coach: Chris Crutchfield (3rd season)
- Assistant coaches: Kyan Brown; Keenan Holdman; Warren Niles
- Home arena: Baxter Arena

2024–25 Summit League men's basketball standings
	Conf.				Overall
Team	W		L	PCT	W		L	PCT
Omaha †	13	–	3	.813	22	–	13	.629
St. Thomas *	12	–	4	.750	24	–	10	.706
South Dakota State	11	–	5	.688	20	–	12	.625
North Dakota State	10	–	6	.625	21	–	11	.656
South Dakota	9	–	7	.563	19	–	14	.576
North Dakota	5	–	11	.313	12	–	21	.364
Denver	5	–	11	.313	11	–	21	.344
Kansas City	4	–	12	.250	13	–	20	.394
Oral Roberts	3	–	13	.188	7	–	23	.233
† 2025 Summit League tournament winner * Ineligible for the 2025 NCAA tournament due to transition from Division III

The 2024–25 Omaha Mavericks men's basketball team represented the University of Nebraska Omaha in the 2024–25 NCAA Division I men's basketball season. The Mavericks, led by third-year head coach Chris Crutchfield, played their home games at Baxter Arena in Omaha, Nebraska as members of the Summit League.

Omaha posted an overall record of 22–12 and a record of 13–3 in Summit League play, earning them the No. 1 seed in the conference tournament. The Mavericks defeated Kansas City, South Dakota, and St. Thomas to win the tournament championship. As a result, they received the conference's automatic bid to the NCAA tournament, the school's first-ever trip to the tournament.

== Previous season ==
The Mavericks finished the 2023–24 season 15–18, 7–9 in Summit League play, to finish in sixth place. They defeated North Dakota in the quarterfinals of the Summit League tournament, before losing to Denver in the semifinals.

== Roster ==
2024–25 Omaha Mavericks men's basketball team
Players
Coaches

Pos.	#	Name	Height	Weight	Year	Previous school	Hometown
G	1	JJ White	6 ft 2 in (1.88 m)	180 lb (82 kg)	Sr	Colby CC	Lawrenceville, GA
G	3	Grant Stubblefield	6 ft 1 in (1.85 m)	180 lb (82 kg)	So	Blue Valley Northwest High School	Overland Park, KS
G	4	Sebastian Perry	6 ft 1 in (1.85 m)	170 lb (77 kg)	RS Fr	Heritage Hall School	Oklahoma City, OK
G	5	Ja'Sean Glover	6 ft 4 in (1.93 m)	205 lb (93 kg)	Jr	Madelia High School	Madelia, MN
G	7	Lance Waddles	6 ft 4 in (1.93 m)	195 lb (88 kg)	Jr	North Dakota State	Shreveport, LA
F	10	Marquel Sutton	6 ft 8 in (2.03 m)	217 lb (98 kg)	Sr	Connors State	Tulsa, OK
G	11	Tucker Mills	6 ft 6 in (1.98 m)	185 lb (84 kg)	RS Fr	Mead High School	Lyons, CO
G	12	Aidan Skradis	6 ft 2 in (1.88 m)	185 lb (84 kg)	Fr	Elkhorn South High School	Elkhorn, NE
F	21	Valentino Simon	6 ft 6 in (1.98 m)	195 lb (88 kg)	Jr	Hutchinson CC	Nassau, Bahamas
F	22	Kamryn Thomas	6 ft 8 in (2.03 m)	200 lb (91 kg)	Jr	Hutchinson CC	Chicago, IL
F	23	Joshua Streit	6 ft 9 in (2.06 m)	245 lb (111 kg)	Sr	North Dakota State	Watkins, MN
C	24	Isaac Ondekane	6 ft 8 in (2.03 m)	275 lb (125 kg)	Sr	Lindenwood	Kinshasa, Congo
G	25	Khamani Cooper	6 ft 4 in (1.93 m)	189 lb (86 kg)	So	Connors CC	Pine Bluff, AR
C	27	Pablo Soumare	6 ft 9 in (2.06 m)	250 lb (113 kg)	Fr	Veritas Academy	Dakar, Senegal
G	32	Tony Osburn	6 ft 2 in (1.88 m)	185 lb (84 kg)	Jr	Mound City High School	Fairfax, MO
C	55	Lincoln Palbicki	6 ft 9 in (2.06 m)	235 lb (107 kg)	RS Fr	Maple Grove High School	Maple Grove, MN

Head coach

- Chris Crutchfield (Omaha)

Assistant coach(es)

- Kyan Brown (Oral Roberts)
- Warren Niles (Oral Roberts)
- Keenan Holdman (Hardin–Simmons)

Legend

- (C) Team captain
- (S) Suspended
- (I) Ineligible
- (W) Walk-on
- Injured
- Current redshirt

Roster
Last update: October 8, 2024

== Schedule and results ==
Date time, TV	Rank^{#}	Opponent^{#}	Result	Record	Site (attendance) city, state
Exhibition
October 29, 2024*; 7:05 p.m.		York (NE)	W 101–62	–	Baxter Arena (885); Omaha, NE
Non-conference regular season
November 4, 2024*; 7:05 p.m., SLN		Mid–America Christian	W 85–69	1–0	Baxter Arena (910); Omaha, NE
November 7, 2024*; 7:00 p.m., ESPN+		at Stetson	W 79–76	2–0	Edmunds Center (561); DeLand, FL
November 9, 2024*; 2:30 p.m., Peacock		at Minnesota	L 64–68	2–1	Williams Arena (8,019); Minneapolis, MN
November 14, 2024*; 9:00 p.m., MW Network		at UNLV	L 69–80	2–2	Thomas & Mack Center (4,817); Paradise, NV
November 16, 2024*; 7:30 p.m., ESPN+		at Southern Utah	L 73–79	2–3	America First Event Center (1,006); Cedar City, UT
November 22, 2024*; 7:30 p.m.		vs. Alabama State; Akron Basketball Classic	L 67–85	2–4	James A. Rhodes Arena; Akron, OH
November 23, 2024*; 3:00 p.m.		at Akron; Akron Basketball Classic	L 84–92	2–5	James A. Rhodes Arena (1,723); Akron, OH
November 24, 2024*; 11:00 a.m.		vs. Lamar; Akron Basketball Classic	W 65–59	3–5	James A. Rhodes Arena (46); Akron, OH
November 30, 2024*; 7:05 p.m., SLN		Abilene Christian	L 55–71	3–6	Baxter Arena (2,243); Omaha, NE
December 4, 2024*; 7:05 p.m., SLN		Montana State; Big Sky–Summit Challenge	L 65–76	3–7	Baxter Arena (1,424); Omaha, NE
December 7, 2024*; 3:00 p.m., ESPN+		at Sacramento State; Big Sky–Summit Challenge	W 70–60	4–7	Hornets Nest (502); Sacramento, CA
December 13, 2024*; 7:00 p.m., ESPN+		at Northern Iowa	L 58–78	4–8	McLeod Center (3,284); Cedar Falls, IA
December 15, 2024*; 12:00 p.m., CBSSN		at No. 3 Iowa State	L 51–83	4–9	Hilton Coliseum (14,267); Ames, IA
December 21, 2024*; 7:05 p.m., SLN		Cal Poly	W 86–82	5–9	Baxter Arena (2,348); Omaha, NE
December 28, 2024*; 7:05 p.m., SLN		Mount Marty	W 81–51	6–9	Baxter Arena (1,804); Omaha, NE
Summit League regular season
January 2, 2025; 7:00 p.m., SLN		at North Dakota	W 95–85	7–9 (1–0)	Betty Engelstad Sioux Center (1,592); Grand Forks, ND
January 4, 2025; 1:00 p.m., SLN		at North Dakota State	W 85–80	8–9 (2–0)	Scheels Center (1,629); Fargo, ND
January 8, 2025; 8:00 p.m., CBSSN		Kansas City	W 77–58	9–9 (3–0)	Baxter Arena (2,437); Omaha, NE
January 11, 2025; 1:05 p.m., SLN		South Dakota State	W 87–80	10–9 (4–0)	Baxter Arena (2,849); Omaha, NE
January 15, 2025; 6:00 p.m., SLN		at Denver	W 80–62	11–9 (5–0)	Hamilton Gymnasium (527); Denver, CO
January 23, 2025; 7:05 p.m., SLN		St. Thomas	W 89–78	12–9 (6–0)	Baxter Arena (3,234); Omaha, NE
January 25, 2025; 7:00 p.m., SLN		at Oral Roberts	W 84–76	13–9 (7–0)	Mabee Center (4,008); Tulsa, OK
January 29, 2025; 7:00 p.m., SLN		at South Dakota	L 87–91	13–10 (7–1)	Sanford Coyote Sports Center (1,676); Vermillion, SD
February 1, 2025; 7:05 p.m., SLN		Denver	W 78–69	14–10 (8–1)	Baxter Arena (3,356); Omaha, NE
February 6, 2025; 7:05 p.m., SLN		North Dakota	W 80–77	15–10 (9–1)	Baxter Arena (2,508); Omaha, NE
February 8, 2025; 1:05 p.m., SLN		North Dakota State	W 85–74	16–10 (10–1)	Baxter Arena (2,288); Omaha, NE
February 13, 2025; 1:00 p.m., SLN		at South Dakota State	L 85–98	16–11 (10–2)	First Bank & Trust Arena (3,842); Brookings, SD
February 15, 2025; 7:00 p.m., SLN		at St. Thomas	L 84–95	16–12 (10–3)	Shoenecker Arena (2,008); St. Paul, MN
February 19, 2025; 7:00 p.m., SLN		at Kansas City	W 78–66	17–12 (11–3)	Swinney Recreation Center (1,010); Kansas City, MO
February 22, 2025; 7:05 p.m., SLN		South Dakota	W 93–85	18–12 (12–3)	Baxter Arena (4,283); Omaha, NE
March 1, 2025; 1:05 p.m., SLN		Oral Roberts	W 80–57	19–12 (13–3)	Baxter Arena (4,127); Omaha, NE
Summit League tournament
March 6, 2025*; 6:00 p.m., SLN	(1)	vs. (8) Kansas City; Quarterfinals	W 70–61	20–12	Denny Sanford Premier Center (5,814); Sioux Falls, SD
March 8, 2025*; 7:00 p.m., CBSSN	(1)	vs. (5) South Dakota; Semifinals	W 100–75	21–12	Denny Sanford Premier Center (8,345); Sioux Falls, SD
March 9, 2025*; 8:00 p.m., CBSSN	(1)	vs. (2) St. Thomas; Championship	W 85–75	22–12	Denny Sanford Premier Center (7,597); Sioux Falls, SD
NCAA tournament
March 20, 2025*; 8:45 p.m., CBS	(15 W)	vs. (2 W) No. 5 St. John's; First Round	L 53–83	22–13	Amica Mutual Pavilion (11,434); Providence, RI
*Non-conference game. ^{#}Rankings from AP poll. (#) Tournament seedings in parentheses. W=West. All times are in Central.
