= 2024–25 Summit League men's basketball season =

College men's basketball season

- League: NCAA Division I
- Sport: Basketball
- Teams: 9
- TV partner(s): Summit League Network, CBS Sports Network

Regular season
- Regular season champion: Omaha
- Season MVP: Marquel Sutton, Omaha

Summit League tournament
- Champions: Omaha
- Runners-up: St. Thomas
- Tournament MVP: Marquel Sutton

Seasons
- ← 2023–24 2025–26 →

2024–25 Summit League men's basketball standings
| | Conf. | | | | Overall |
| Team | W | | L | PCT | W | | L | PCT |
|---|---|---|---|---|---|---|---|---|
| Omaha † | 13 | – | 3 | .813 | 22 | – | 13 | .629 |
| St. Thomas * | 12 | – | 4 | .750 | 24 | – | 10 | .706 |
| South Dakota State | 11 | – | 5 | .688 | 20 | – | 12 | .625 |
| North Dakota State | 10 | – | 6 | .625 | 21 | – | 11 | .656 |
| South Dakota | 9 | – | 7 | .563 | 19 | – | 14 | .576 |
| North Dakota | 5 | – | 11 | .313 | 12 | – | 21 | .364 |
| Denver | 5 | – | 11 | .313 | 11 | – | 21 | .344 |
| Kansas City | 4 | – | 12 | .250 | 13 | – | 20 | .394 |
| Oral Roberts | 3 | – | 13 | .188 | 7 | – | 23 | .233 |
† 2025 Summit League tournament winner * Ineligible for the 2025 NCAA tournament due to transition from Division III

The 2024–25 Summit League men's basketball season started non-conference play on November 4, 2024, and began conference play on January 2, 2025. The regular season ended on March 1, 2025, and set up the 2025 Summit League men's basketball tournament which took place from March 5 to 9, 2025.
Omaha finished league play with a 13–3 record as the regular season champion. The Mavericks would go on to win the Summit League tournament, defeating St. Thomas. In the program's first NCAA tournament, Omaha was seeded 15th in the West region and played 2nd seeded St. John's. The Mavericks would fall to the Red Storm, 53–83.

== Head coaches ==
| Team | Head Coach | Previous Job | Years At School | Record at School | Summit League Record | Summit League Titles | NCAA tournaments | NCAA Sweet 16's |
|---|---|---|---|---|---|---|---|---|
| Denver | Jeff Wulbrun | Stanford (Assistant) | 4 | 43–55 | 19–33 | 0 | 0 | 0 |
| Kansas City | Marvin Menzies | Grand Canyon (Associate HC) | 3 | 27–37 | 17–17 | 0 | 5 | 0 |
| North Dakota | Paul Sather | Northern State | 6 | 61–94 | 33–51 | 0 | 0 | 0 |
| North Dakota State | David Richman | North Dakota State (Assistant) | 11 | 187–131 | 97–62 | 3 | 2 | 0 |
| Omaha | Chris Crutchfield | Oregon (Assistant) | 3 | 23–40 | 11–23 | 0 | 0 | 0 |
| Oral Roberts | Russell Springmann | Oral Roberts (Assistant) | 2 | 12–19 | 5–11 | 0 | 0 | 0 |
| St. Thomas | John Tauer | St. Thomas (Assistant) | 13 | 266–100^ | 22–30 | 0 | 0^^ | 0^^^ |
| South Dakota | Eric Peterson | Utah (Assistant) | 3 | 24–38 | 12–22 | 0 | 0 | 0 |
| South Dakota State | Eric Henderson | South Dakota State (Assistant) | 6 | 109–48 | 65–15 | 2 | 2 | 0 |

Notes:

- Year at school includes 2024–25 season.
- Overall and Summit League records are from the time at their current school and are through the end of the 2023–24 season.
- NCAA tournament appearances are from the time at current school only.

^218 wins and 50 losses at the Division III level

^^8 NCAA Division III Tournaments

^^^4 NCAA Division III Sweet 16s, 2 NCAA Division III Final Fours, and 1 NCAA Division III National Championship

== Preseason awards ==
The preseason Summit League men's basketball polls were released on October 8, 2024.

=== Preseason poll ===
First place votes in parentheses

1. Kansas City (17) – 514
2. South Dakota State (12) – 474
3. North Dakota State (3) – 384
4. St. Thomas – 308
5. Oral Roberts (2) – 305
6. North Dakota (1) – 283
7. South Dakota (1) – 250
8. Omaha – 159
9. Denver – 158

=== Preseason honors ===
| Honor | Recipient |
|---|---|
| Preseason Player of the Year | Issac McBride, Oral Roberts |
| Preseason All-Summit League First Team | Kendall Blue, St. Thomas |
| Preseason All-Summit League First Team | Jamar Brown, Kansas City |
| Preseason All-Summit League First Team | Treysen Eaglestaff, North Dakota |
| Preseason All-Summit League First Team | Amar Kuljuhovic, North Dakota |
| Preseason All-Summit League First Team | Issac McBride, Oral Roberts |
| Preseason All-Summit League First Team | Kaleb Stewart, South Dakota |
| Preseason All-Summit League Second Team | Oscar Cluff, South Dakota State |
| Preseason All-Summit League Second Team | DeAndre Craig, Denver |
| Preseason All-Summit League Second Team | Kalen Garry, South Dakota State |
| Preseason All-Summit League Second Team | Marquel Sutton, Omaha |
| Preseason All-Summit League Second Team | Jacari White, North Dakota State |

== Regular season ==
=== Conference standings ===
Current as of March 20, 2025

| | | Conference | | Overall | | |
| Rank | Team | Record | Percent | Record | Percent | Tiebreaker |
|---|---|---|---|---|---|---|
| 1 | Omaha | 13–3 | .813 | 22–13 | .629 | |
| 2 | St. Thomas | 12–4 | .750 | 24–10 | .706 | |
| 3 | South Dakota State | 11–5 | .688 | 20–12 | .625 | |
| 4 | North Dakota State | 10–6 | .625 | 21–11 | .656 | |
| 5 | South Dakota | 9–7 | .563 | 19–14 | .576 | |
| 6 | North Dakota | 5–11 | .313 | 12–21 | .364 | |
| 7 | Denver | 5–11 | .313 | 11–21 | .344 | |
| 8 | Kansas City | 4–12 | .250 | 13–20 | .394 | |
| 9 | Oral Roberts | 3–13 | .188 | 7–23 | .233 | |

=== Conference matrix ===
| | Denver | Kansas City | North Dakota | North Dakota State | Omaha | Oral Roberts | St. Thomas | South Dakota | South Dakota State |
|---|---|---|---|---|---|---|---|---|---|
| vs. Denver | – | 1–1 | 1–1 | 2–0 | 2–0 | 0–2 | 2–0 | 2–0 | 1–1 |
| vs. Kansas City | 1–1 | – | 1–1 | 2–0 | 2–0 | 1–1 | 2–0 | 1–1 | 2–0 |
| vs. North Dakota | 1–1 | 1–1 | – | 1–1 | 2–0 | 1–1 | 2–0 | 2–0 | 1–1 |
| vs. North Dakota State | 0–2 | 0–2 | 1–1 | – | 2–0 | 0–2 | 2–0 | 0–2 | 1–1 |
| vs. Omaha | 0–2 | 0–2 | 0–2 | 0–2 | – | 0–2 | 1–1 | 1–1 | 1–1 |
| vs. Oral Roberts | 2–0 | 1–1 | 1–1 | 2–0 | 2–0 | – | 1–1 | 2–0 | 2–0 |
| vs. St. Thomas | 0–2 | 0–2 | 0–2 | 0–2 | 1–1 | 1–1 | – | 1–1 | 1–1 |
| vs. South Dakota | 0–2 | 1–1 | 0–2 | 2–0 | 1–1 | 0–2 | 1–1 | – | 2–0 |
| vs. South Dakota State | 1–1 | 0–2 | 1–1 | 1–1 | 1–1 | 0–2 | 1–1 | 0–2 | – |
| Total | 5–11 | 4–12 | 5–11 | 10–6 | 13–3 | 3–13 | 12–4 | 9–7 | 11–5 |

Through March 1, 2025

=== Players of the Week ===
| Week | Player(s) of the Week | School |
|---|---|---|
| Nov. 11 | Oscar Cluff | South Dakota State |
| Nov. 18 | Treysen Eaglestaff | North Dakota |
| Nov. 25 | Marquel Sutton | Omaha |
| Dec. 2 | Oscar Cluff (2) | South Dakota State (2) |
| Dec. 9 | Jackson Moni | North Dakota State |
| Dec. 16 | Chase Forte | South Dakota |
| Dec. 16 | Jackson Moni (2) | North Dakota State (2) |
| Dec. 23 | Treysen Eaglestaff (2) | North Dakota (2) |
| Dec. 30 | Jackson Moni (3) | North Dakota State (3) |
| Jan. 6 | Miles Barnstable | St. Thomas |
| Jan. 6 | Oscar Cluff (3) | South Dakota State (3) |
| Jan. 13 | Issac McBride | Oral Roberts |
| Jan. 20 | Oscar Cluff (4) | South Dakota State (4) |
| Jan. 27 | JJ White | Omaha (2) |
| Feb. 3 | Dre Bullock | South Dakota (2) |
| Feb. 10 | Jamar Brown | Kansas City |
| Feb. 17 | Oscar Cluff (5) | South Dakota State (5) |
| Feb. 24 | Marquel Sutton (2) | Omaha (3) |
| Mar. 3 | Chase Forte (2) | South Dakota (3) |

=== Records against other conferences ===
As of December 30, 2024:

| Major 6 Conferences | Record | Major 6 Conferences | Record |
|---|---|---|---|
| ACC | 0–2 | American | 1–3 |
| Big East | 1–1 | Big Ten | 0–4 |
| Big 12 | 0–6 | SEC | 0–3 |
| Major 6 Total | | | 2–19 |
| Other Division I Conferences | Record | Other Division I Conferences | Record |
| Atlantic 10 | 1–0 | ASUN | 2–0 |
| America East | 0–1 | Big Sky | 13–10 |
| Big South | None | Big West | 3–5 |
| CAA | None | Conference USA | None |
| Horizon League | 1–1 | Ivy League | None |
| Independents | None | MAAC | None |
| MAC | 5–1 | MEAC | None |
| MVC | 1–5 | MWC | 0–6 |
| NEC | None | OVC | 1–2 |
| Patriot League | 0–1 | SoCon | 1–2 |
| Southland | 3–1 | SWAC | 1–2 |
| Sun Belt | 1–0 | WAC | 3–4 |
| WCC | 3–2 | | |
| Other Division I Total | | | 32–41 |
| NCAA Division I Total | | | 39–63 |
| NCAA Division II Total | | | 6–1 |
| NCAA Division III Total | | | 4–0 |
| NAIA Total | | | 11–0 |
| NCCAA Total | | | 5–0 |
| Total Non-Conference Record | | | 65–64 |

=== Record against ranked non-conference opponents ===
Summit League records against ranked teams (rankings from AP Poll, Summit teams in Bold):

| Date | Visitor | Home | Site | Score | Conference record | Reference |
|---|---|---|---|---|---|---|
| November 11 | **Kansas City** | No. 7 Iowa State | Hilton Coliseum; Ames, IA | **L 56**–82 | **0–1** | |
| November 16 | **Kansas City** | No. 14 Creighton | CHI Health Center Omaha; Omaha, NE | **L 56**–79 | **0–2** | |
| December 15 | **Omaha** | No. 3 Iowa State | Hilton Coliseum; Ames, IA | **L 51**–83 | **0–3** | |
| December 18 | No. 7 Alabama | **North Dakota** | Betty Engelstad Sioux Center; Grand Forks, ND | **L 90**–97 | **0–4** | |
| December 29 | **South Dakota State** | No. 5 Alabama | Coleman Coliseum; Tuscaloosa, AL | **L 82**–105 | **0–5** | |

=== Points scored ===
| Team | For | Against | Difference |
|---|---|---|---|
| Denver | 2316 | 2483 | –167 |
| Kansas City | 2386 | 2218 | +168 |
| North Dakota | 2550 | 2624 | –74 |
| North Dakota State | 2595 | 2386 | +209 |
| Omaha | 2654 | 2551 | +103 |
| Oral Roberts | 2200 | 2356 | –156 |
| St. Thomas | 2827 | 2544 | +283 |
| South Dakota | 2812 | 2763 | +49 |
| South Dakota State | 2546 | 2352 | +194 |

Through March 17, 2025

=== Home attendance ===
| Team | Arena | Capacity | Total Games | Average Attendance | Attendance High | Total Attendance | % of Capacity |
|---|---|---|---|---|---|---|---|
| Denver | Hamilton Gymnasium | 2,500 | 14 | 782 | 1,165; Mar 1 vs. South Dakota St | 10,948 | 31.3% |
| Kansas City | Swinney Recreation Center | 1,500 | 13 | 883 | **1,534**; Jan 25 vs. St. Thomas | 11,491 | 58.9% |
| North Dakota | Betty Engelstad Sioux Center | 3,300 | 13 | 1,928 | 3,085; Dec 18 vs. 6 Alabama | 25,074 | 58.4% |
| North Dakota State | Scheels Center | 5,460 | 14 | 1,755 | 5,198; Jan 25 vs. North Dakota | 24,578 | 32.2% |
| Omaha | Baxter Arena | 7,898 | 13 | 2,645 | 4,283; Feb 22 vs. South Dakota | 34,395 | 33.5% |
| Oral Roberts | Mabee Center | 10,154 | 13 | 3,283 | 4,811; Nov 16 vs. Haskell | 42,685 | 32.3% |
| St. Thomas | Schoenecker Arena | 1,800 | 12 | 1,418 | **2,068**; Feb 2 vs. North Dakota St | 17,016 | 78.8% |
| South Dakota | Sanford Coyote Sports Center | 6,000 | 16 | 1,908 | 3,942; Feb 16 vs. South Dakota St | 30,538 | 31.8% |
| South Dakota State | First Bank and Trust Arena | 6,500 | 14 | 2,990 | 4,764; Jan 25 vs. South Dakota | 41,872 | 46.0% |

Bold - Exceed capacity
As of March 1, 2025
Does not include exhibition games

=== National Television Games ===
Any games that league members will play on National Television, including the Summit League's media contract with CBS Sports Network, are listed here.

Summit League members in bold

| Date Time (CT) | Road Team | Home team | Final Score | Network |
|---|---|---|---|---|
| November 16, 2024; 6 PM | **Kansas City** | No. 14 Creighton | **L 56**–79 | FS2 |
| December 10, 2024; 7 PM | **North Dakota State** | Butler | **W 71**–68 | FS1 |
| December 15, 2024; 12 PM | **Omaha** | No. 3 Iowa State | **L 51**–83 | CBSSN |
| December 18, 2024; 8 PM | No. 7 Alabama | **North Dakota** | **L 90**–97 | CBSSN |
| January 2, 2025; 8 PM | **Denver** | **South Dakota State** | 70–91 | CBSSN |
| January 8, 2025; 7 PM | **Kansas City** | **Omaha** | 58–77 | CBSSN |
| February 2, 2025; 3 PM | **North Dakota State** | **St. Thomas** | 62–79 | CBSSN |
| February 13, 2025; 8 PM | **Oral Roberts** | **North Dakota State** | 88–94^{OT} | CBSSN |
| February 16, 2025; 1 PM | **South Dakota State** | **South Dakota** | 94–91 | CBSSN |
| February 23, 2025; 1 PM | **Kansas City** | **South Dakota State** | 65–70 | CBSSN |

=== All–League Honors ===
| Honor | Recipient |
|---|---|
| Player of the Year | Marquel Sutton, Omaha |
| Defensive Player of the Year | Chase Forte, South Dakota |
| Sixth Man of the Year | Tajavis Miller, North Dakota State |
| Freshman of the Year | Sebastian Akins, Denver |
| Newcomer of the Year | Oscar Cluff, South Dakota State |
| Coach of the Year | Chris Crutchfield, Omaha |
| All-Summit League First Team | Marquel Sutton, Omaha |
| All-Summit League First Team | Miles Barnstable, St. Thomas |
| All-Summit League First Team | Oscar Cluff, South Dakota State |
| All-Summit League First Team | Chase Forte, South Dakota |
| All-Summit League First Team | Jacksen Moni, North Dakota State |
| All-Summit League First Team | JJ White, Omaha |
| All-Summit League Second Team | Jamar Brown, Kansas City |
| All-Summit League Second Team | Drake Dobbs, St. Thomas |
| All-Summit League Second Team | Treysen Eaglestaff, North Dakota |
| All-Summit League Second Team | Issac McBride, Oral Roberts |
| All-Summit League Second Team | Jacari White, North Dakota State |
| All-Summit League Honorable Mention | Issac Bruns, South Dakota |
| All-Summit League Honorable Mention | Dre Bullock, South Dakota |
| All-Summit League Honorable Mention | Kalen Garry, South Dakota State |
| All-Summit League Honorable Mention | Masen Miller, North Dakota State |
| All-Summit League Honorable Mention | Mier Panoam, North Dakota |
| All-Defensive Team | Oscar Cluff, South Dakota State |
| All-Defensive Team | Drake Dobbs, St. Thomas |
| All-Defensive Team | Chase Forte, South Dakota |
| All-Defensive Team | Eli King, North Dakota |
| All-Defensive Team | Ja'Sean Glover, Omaha |
| All-Newcomer Team | Sebastian Akins, Denver |
| All-Newcomer Team | Miles Barnstable, St. Thomas |
| All-Newcomer Team | Oscar Cluff, South Dakota State |
| All-Newcomer Team | Chase Forte, South Dakota |
| All-Newcomer Team | Jacksen Moni, North Dakota State |

== Postseason ==
=== Conference tournament ===
All 9 teams qualified for the Summit League tournament. The tournament was held at the Denny Sanford Premier Center in Sioux Falls, South Dakota from March 5 to 9, 2024.

First Round; March 5 MidcoSN/SLN
8 | Kansas City | 73
9 | Oral Roberts | 56

Quarterfinals; March 6 & 7 MidcoSN/SLN
1 | Omaha | 70
8 | Kansas City | 61
4 | North Dakota State | 84
5 | South Dakota | 85
2 | St. Thomas | 80
7 | Denver | 62
3 | South Dakota State | 69
6 | North Dakota | 85

Semifinals; March 8 CBSSN
1 | Omaha | 100
5 | South Dakota | 75
2 | St. Thomas | 85
6 | North Dakota | 69

Final; March 9 CBSSN
1 | Omaha | 85
2 | St. Thomas | 75

=== NCAA tournament ===
| Seed | Region | School | First Round | Second Round | Sweet Sixteen | Elite Eight | Final Four | Championship |
|---|---|---|---|---|---|---|---|---|
| No. 15 | West | Omaha | lost to No. 2 St. John's | — | — | — | — | |
| | 1 Bid | W-L (%): | 0–1 (.000) | 0–0 (–) | 0–0 (–) | 0–0 (–) | 0–0 (–) | TOTAL: 0–1 (.000) |
