= 2024–25 Idaho State Bengals men's basketball team =

American college basketball season

2024–25 Idaho State Bengals men's basketball
- Conference: Big Sky Conference
- Record: 15–15 (10–8 Big Sky)
- Head coach: Ryan Looney (6th season)
- Associate head coach: Joe White
- Assistant coaches: Stu Engen; Devin Kastrup; Akil Reese
- Home arena: Reed Gym

2024–25 Big Sky men's basketball standings
	Conf.				Overall
Team	W		L	PCT	W		L	PCT
Northern Colorado	15	–	3	.833	25	–	10	.714
Montana †	15	–	3	.833	25	–	10	.714
Portland State	11	–	7	.611	19	–	13	.594
Idaho State	10	–	8	.556	15	–	15	.500
Montana State	9	–	9	.500	15	–	18	.455
Idaho	8	–	10	.444	14	–	19	.424
Northern Arizona	8	–	10	.444	18	–	16	.529
Eastern Washington	6	–	12	.333	10	–	22	.313
Weber State	5	–	13	.278	12	–	22	.353
Sacramento State	3	–	15	.167	7	–	25	.219
† 2025 Big Sky tournament winner

The 2024–25 Idaho State Bengals men's basketball team represented Idaho State University during the 2024–25 NCAA Division I men's basketball season. The Bengals, led by sixth-year head coach Ryan Looney, played their home games at Reed Gym in Pocatello, Idaho as members of the Big Sky Conference. The Bengals finished the season 15–15, 10–8 in Big Sky play, to finish in fourth place. They were defeated by Montana State in the first round of the Big Sky conference tournament.

== Previous season ==
The Bengals finished the 2023–24 season 14–20, 7–11 in Big Sky play, to finish in a tie for seventh place. They defeated Northern Arizona and upset #2 seed Northern Colorado, before falling to eventual tournament runner-up Montana in the semifinals of the Big Sky tournament.

== Offseason ==
=== Departures ===
Departures
Name	Number	Pos.	Height	Weight	Year	Hometown	Notes
Kolton Mitchell	0	G	6' 1"	175	Freshman	Coeur d'Alene, ID	Transferred to Idaho
Maleek Arington	3	G	6' 3"	200	Sophomore	Auburn, WA	Transferred to Seattle
Laolu Kalejaiye	5	G	6' 0"	160	Freshman	Los Angeles, CA	
Miguel Tomley	10	G	6' 3"	200	Junior	Surrey, BC	Transferred to Weber State
Turner Livingston	12	F	6' 4"	195	(redshirt) Freshman	Spokane, WA	Transferred to Bushnell
Jordan Hansen	14	G	6' 6"	215	Sophomore	Seattle, WA	Transferred to Azusa Pacific
Kiree Huie	15	F	6' 9"	220	Junior	Grayson, CA	Transferred to Miami (FL)
Briggs Ranstrom	20	F	6' 6"	205	(redshirt) Freshman	Eagle, ID	Transferred to Northwest Nazarene
James Bodily	22	G	6' 3"	200	Freshman	Bancroft, ID	Transferred to Eastern Oregon
Brayden Parker	25	C	6' 8"	250	Graduate student	Preston, ID	Graduated
Trent Johnson	31	F	6' 7"	205	Junior	Cambridge, ON	Transferred to Houston Christian
Gavin Gilstrap	32	C	6' 11"	270	Junior	Spokane, WA	Transferred to Saint Martin's
Louis Stormark	44	C	6' 9"	250	(redshirt) Sophomore	Alleroed, Denmark	

=== Incoming transfers ===
Incoming transfers
Name	Number	Pos.	Height	Weight	Year	Hometown	Previous school
Joey Madimba	0	G	6' 5"	205	Junior	Mansfield, TX	Howard
Dylan Darling	1	G	6' 1"	180	(redshirt) Sophomore	Spokane, WA	Washington State
Quentin Meza	3	G	6' 0"	180	Sophomore	West Valley City, UT	Wofford
Cheikh Sow	5	G	6' 7"	195	Junior	Thiès, Senegal	Cloud County CC
Jake O'Neil	8	G	6' 4"	210	Graduate student	Fruitland, ID	College of Idaho
Connor Hollenbeck	10	F	6' 7"	225	Graduate student	Rapid City, SD	Minot State
Cam Slaymaker	11	G	6' 4"	195	Junior	Coquitlam, BC	Southern Nazarene
Covy Kelly	14	G	6' 2"	182	Junior	Garden Valley, ID	Walla Walla CC
Jackson Greene	21	F	6' 7"	182	Junior	Atlanta, GA	Eastern Oklahoma State
Justin Graham	24	F	6' 7"	200	Senior	Colorado Springs, CO	Montevallo
Blake Daberkow	32	F	6' 10"	235	Junior	Lincoln, NE	Central CC

=== Recruiting class ===
College recruiting information
Name	Hometown	School	Height	Weight	Commit date
Nick Ghetie; G	Lake Oswego, OR	Lakeridge High School	5 ft 11 in (1.80 m)	175 lb (79 kg)	Aug 9, 2024
Nick Ghetie; G	Recruit ratings: Scout: Rivals: 247Sports: (NR)				
Overall recruit ranking:
Note: In many cases, Scout, Rivals, 247Sports, On3, and ESPN may conflict in their listings of height and weight.; In these cases, the average was taken. ESPN grades are on a 100-point scale.; Sources: "2024 Team Ranking". Rivals.

== Roster ==
2024–25 Idaho State Bengals men's basketball team
Players
Coaches

Pos.	#	Name	Height	Weight	Year	Previous school	Hometown
G	0	Joey Madimba	6 ft 5 in (1.96 m)	205 lb (93 kg)	Jr	Howard College	Mansfield, TX
PG	1	Dylan Darling	6 ft 1 in (1.85 m)	180 lb (82 kg)	RS So	Washington State	Spokane, WA
G	2	Nick Ghetie	5 ft 11 in (1.8 m)	175 lb (79 kg)	Fr	Lakeridge High School	Lake Oswego, OR
PG	3	Quentin Meza	6 ft 0 in (1.83 m)	180 lb (82 kg)	So	Wofford	West Valley City, UT
G	4	Jaedyn Brown	6 ft 4 in (1.93 m)	185 lb (84 kg)	RS Fr	Pullman High School	Pullman, WA
G	5	Cheikh Sow	6 ft 7 in (2.01 m)	195 lb (88 kg)	Jr	Cloud County Community College	Thiès, Senegal
G	8	Jake O'Neil	6 ft 4 in (1.93 m)	210 lb (95 kg)	GS	College of Idaho	Fruitland, ID
F	10	Connor Hollenbeck	6 ft 7 in (2.01 m)	225 lb (102 kg)	GS	Minot State	Rapid City, SD
G	11	Cam Slaymaker	6 ft 4 in (1.93 m)	195 lb (88 kg)	Jr	Southern Nazarene	Coquitlam, BC
F	12	Isaiah Griffin	6 ft 6 in (1.98 m)	210 lb (95 kg)	Sr	Southeastern Community College	Raleigh, NC
G	13	AJ Burgin	6 ft 3 in (1.91 m)	205 lb (93 kg)	Sr	San Diego High School	San Diego, CA
G	14	Covy Kelly	6 ft 2 in (1.88 m)	182 lb (83 kg)	Jr	Walla Walla Community College	Garden Valley, ID
F	21	Jackson Greene	6 ft 7 in (2.01 m)	215 lb (98 kg)	Jr	Eastern Oklahoma State	Atlanta, GA
F	24	Justin Graham	6 ft 7 in (2.01 m)	200 lb (91 kg)	Sr	Montevallo	Colorado Springs, CO
F	30	Evan Otten	6 ft 11 in (2.11 m)	235 lb (107 kg)	RS Fr	Redmond High School	Redmond, OR
F	32	Blake Daberkow	6 ft 10 in (2.08 m)	235 lb (107 kg)	Jr	Central Community College	Lincoln, NE

Head coach

- Ryan Looney (Eastern Oregon)

Assistant coach(es)

- Joe White (Southern Oregon)
- Stu Engen (Augsburg)
- Devin Kastrup (Western Colorado)
- Akil Reese (Cal State Monterey Bay)

Legend

- (C) Team captain
- (S) Suspended
- (I) Ineligible
- (W) Walk-on
- Injured
- Current redshirt

Roster
Last update: October 13, 2024

== Schedule and results ==
Date time, TV	Rank^{#}	Opponent^{#}	Result	Record	High points	High rebounds	High assists	Site (attendance) city, state
Exhibition
October 29, 2024*; 7:00 p.m.		Montana Western	Canceled due to scheduling conflicts in the program					Reed Gym; Pocatello, ID
Non-conference regular season
November 5, 2024*; 7:00 p.m., ESPN+		at Arizona State	L 48–55	0–1	12 – Griffin	11 – O'Neil	3 – Darling	Desert Financial Arena (6,966); Tempe, AZ
November 7, 2024*; 8:00 p.m., BTN+		at USC	L 69–75	0–2	22 – Darling	12 – Otten	7 – Darling	Galen Center (3,731); Los Angeles, CA
November 11, 2024*; 7:00 p.m., ESPN+		Southern Oregon	W 87–63	1–2	17 – O'Neil	8 – O'Neil	6 – Meza	Reed Gym (1,179); Pocatello, ID
November 16, 2024*; 1:00 p.m., ESPN+		at San Diego	W 78–66	2–2	15 – Griffin	9 – Otten	8 – Darling	Jenny Craig Pavilion (297); San Diego, CA
November 18, 2024*; 8:00 p.m., ESPN+		at Cal State Fullerton	L 61–62	2–3	17 – 2 tied	12 – O'Neil	3 – Darling	Titan Gym (867); Fullerton, CA
November 20, 2024*; 9:00 p.m., BTN		at UCLA	L 70–84	2–4	16 – Griffin	5 – O'Neil	3 – Darling	Pauley Pavilion (4,059); Los Angeles, CA
November 25, 2024*; 7:00 p.m., ESPN+		Embry–Riddle (AZ)	W 97–46	3–4	18 – Hollenbeck	10 – O'Neil	10 – Darling	Reed Gym (976); Pocatello, ID
December 4, 2024*; 6:00 p.m.		at South Dakota; Big Sky–Summit Challenge	L 80–94	3–5	25 – Burgin	9 – O'Neil	4 – Meza	Sanford Coyote Sports Center (1,589); Vermillion, SD
December 7, 2024*; 6:00 p.m., ESPN+		Oral Roberts; Big Sky–Summit Challenge	W 71–55	4–5	14 – 2 tied	19 – O'Neil	9 – Darling	Reed Gym (1,072); Pocatello, ID
December 14, 2024*; 6:00 p.m., ESPN+		Walla Walla	W 97–42	5–5	20 – Brown	10 – 3 tied	10 – Burgin	Reed Gym (1,029); Pocatello, ID
December 18, 2024*; 7:00 p.m., ESPN+		Utah Valley	L 56–70	5–6	21 – O'Neil	14 – O'Neil	4 – Burgin	Reed Gym (1,127); Pocatello, ID
Big Sky regular season
January 2, 2025; 6:00 p.m., ESPN+		at Northern Arizona	W 72–67	6–6 (1–0)	20 – Darling	15 – O'Neil	7 – Darling	Findlay Toyota Court (685); Flagstaff, AZ
January 4, 2025; 2:00 p.m., ESPN+		at Northern Colorado	L 92–93 ^{OT}	6–7 (1–1)	22 – Darling	8 – O'Neil	7 – Darling	Bank of Colorado Arena (1,055); Greeley, CO
January 11, 2025; 6:00 p.m., ESPN+		Weber State	L 69–77	6–8 (1–2)	28 – Darling	14 – O'Neil	3 – Darling	Reed Gym (2,323); Pocatello, ID
January 16, 2025; 7:00 p.m., ESPN+		Montana State	W 70–67	7–8 (2–2)	22 – Hollenbeck	11 – O'Neil	5 – 2 tied	Reed Gym (1,321); Pocatello, ID
January 18, 2025; 6:00 p.m., ESPN+		Montana	W 86–61	8–8 (3–2)	23 – Griffin	12 – O'Neil	8 – Darling	Reed Gym (1,530); Pocatello, ID
January 23, 2025; 8:00 p.m., ESPN+		at Sacramento State	L 71–75	8–9 (3–3)	25 – Darling	12 – O'Neil	7 – Darling	Hornets Nest (1,007); Sacramento, CA
January 25, 2025; 3:00 p.m., ESPN+		at Portland State	L 59–76	8–10 (3–4)	11 – Darling	8 – Griffin	4 – Darling	Viking Pavilion (696); Portland, OR
January 30, 2025; 7:00 p.m., ESPN+		Eastern Washington	W 78–70	9–10 (4–4)	29 – Darling	9 – Darling	6 – Darling	Reed Gym (1,242); Pocatello, ID
February 1, 2025; 2:00 p.m., ESPN+		Idaho; Battle of the Domes	W 87–71	10–10 (5–4)	28 – Darling	10 – O'Neil	9 – Darling	Reed Gym (1,729); Pocatello, ID
February 3, 2025; 7:00 p.m., ESPN+		Northern Colorado	L 72–86	10–11 (5–5)	21 – O'Neil	10 – O'Neil	4 – Darling	Reed Gym (1,481); Pocatello, ID
February 8, 2025; 7:00 p.m., ESPN+		at Weber State	W 72–67	11–11 (6–5)	30 – Darling	7 – 2 tied	3 – 2 tied	Dee Events Center (3,046); Ogden, UT
February 13, 2025; 7:00 p.m., ESPN+		at Montana	L 68–81	11–12 (6–6)	33 – Darling	6 – Greene	4 – Darling	Dahlberg Arena (2,804); Missoula, MT
February 15, 2025; 6:00 p.m., ESPN+		at Montana State	L 69–74	11–13 (6–7)	27 – Darling	7 – O'Neil	4 – Darling	Worthington Arena (3,222); Bozeman, MT
February 20, 2025; 7:00 p.m., ESPN+		Portland State	W 82–74	12–13 (7–7)	16 – 2 tied	7 – 2 tied	13 – Darling	Reed Gym (1,282); Pocatello, ID
February 22, 2025; 6:00 p.m., ESPN+		Sacramento State	W 83–66	13–13 (8–7)	20 – Darling	10 – O'Neil	6 – Darling	Reed Gym (1,721); Pocatello, ID
February 27, 2025; 7:00 p.m., ESPN+		at Idaho; Battle of the Domes	W 69–65	14–13 (9–7)	19 – Darling	7 – O'Neil	5 – Darling	ICCU Arena (2,315); Moscow, ID
March 1, 2025; 3:00 p.m., ESPN+		at Eastern Washington	W 78–54	15–13 (10–7)	24 – Darling	12 – Hollenbeck	6 – Darling	Reese Court (1,965); Cheney, WA
March 3, 2025; 7:00 p.m., ESPN+		Northern Arizona	L 79–82	15–14 (10–8)	34 – Darling	7 – O'Neil	6 – Darling	Reed Gym (1,836); Pocatello, ID
Big Sky tournament
March 10, 2025; 5:30 pm, ESPN+	(4)	vs. (5) Montana State; Quarterfinals	L 60–80	15–15	16 – 2 tied	7 – 2 tied	2 – 2 tied	Idaho Central Arena; Boise, ID
*Non-conference game. ^{#}Rankings from AP poll. (#) Tournament seedings in parentheses. All times are in Mountain.
