= 2024–25 North Dakota Fighting Hawks men's basketball team =

American college basketball season

2024–25 North Dakota Fighting Hawks men's basketball
- Conference: Summit League
- Record: 12–21 (5–11 The Summit)
- Head coach: Paul Sather (6th season)
- Assistant coaches: Jamie Stevens; Randall Herbst; Estevan Sandoval
- Home arena: Betty Engelstad Sioux Center

2024–25 Summit League men's basketball standings
	Conf.				Overall
Team	W		L	PCT	W		L	PCT
Omaha †	13	–	3	.813	22	–	13	.629
St. Thomas *	12	–	4	.750	24	–	10	.706
South Dakota State	11	–	5	.688	20	–	12	.625
North Dakota State	10	–	6	.625	21	–	11	.656
South Dakota	9	–	7	.563	19	–	14	.576
North Dakota	5	–	11	.313	12	–	21	.364
Denver	5	–	11	.313	11	–	21	.344
Kansas City	4	–	12	.250	13	–	20	.394
Oral Roberts	3	–	13	.188	7	–	23	.233
† 2025 Summit League tournament winner * Ineligible for the 2025 NCAA tournament due to transition from Division III

The 2024–25 North Dakota Fighting Hawks men's basketball team represented the University of North Dakota during the 2024–25 NCAA Division I men's basketball season. The Fighting Hawks were led by sixth-year head coach Paul Sather and played their home games at the Betty Engelstad Sioux Center in Grand Forks, North Dakota as members of the Summit League.

The Fighting Hawks finished the season 12–21, 5–11 in Summit League play, to finish in a tie for sixth place. In the Summit League tournament, they defeated No. 3 seed South Dakota State in the quarterfinals, but were eliminated by No. 2 seed St. Thomas in the semifinals.

== Previous season ==
The Fighting Hawks finished the 2023–24 season 18–14, 10–6 in Summit League play, to finish in a tie for second place. In the Summit League tournament, they lost to Omaha in the quarterfinals.

== Preseason ==
Summit League preseason poll

	Summit League preseason	
1.	Kansas City	514 (17)
2.	South Dakota State	474 (12)
3.	North Dakota State	384 (3)
4.	St. Thomas	308
5.	Oral Roberts	305 (2)
6.	North Dakota	283 (1)
7.	South Dakota	250 (1)
8.	Omaha	159
9.	Denver	158

== Roster ==
2024–25 North Dakota Fighting Hawks men's basketball team
Players
Coaches

Pos.	#	Name	Height	Weight	Year	Hometown
G	1	Zach Kraft	6 ft 2 in (1.88 m)	180 lb (82 kg)	So	Grand Forks, ND
G	2	Eli King	6 ft 4 in (1.93 m)	190 lb (86 kg)	Jr	Caledonia, MN
G	3	Mier Panoam	6 ft 2 in (1.88 m)	200 lb (91 kg)	So	Anchorage, AK
F	4	Dariyus Woodson	6 ft 7 in (2.01 m)	220 lb (100 kg)	Jr	Baytown, TX
F	5	Deng Mayar	6 ft 8 in (2.03 m)	180 lb (82 kg)	Sr	Salt Lake City, UT
F/C	9	Amar Kuljuhovic	6 ft 8 in (2.03 m)	225 lb (102 kg)	Sr	Waterloo, IA
G	11	Reggie Thomas	6 ft 1 in (1.85 m)	190 lb (86 kg)	Jr	Omaha, NE
F	13	George Natsvishvili	6 ft 10 in (2.08 m)	227 lb (103 kg)	Fr	Georgia
F/C	15	Ryan Erikson	6 ft 10 in (2.08 m)	250 lb (113 kg)	So	Bismarck, ND
F	21	Mambourou Mara	6 ft 6 in (1.98 m)	190 lb (86 kg)	So	Conakry, Guinea
F	22	Matthew Bothun	6 ft 9 in (2.06 m)	200 lb (91 kg)	So	St. Francis, MN
G	30	Greyson Uelmen	6 ft 2 in (1.88 m)	175 lb (79 kg)	Fr	Excelsior, MN
G	33	Anthony Doppler	6 ft 4 in (1.93 m)	185 lb (84 kg)	So	Bismarck, ND
F	34	Brian Mathews	6 ft 10 in (2.08 m)	240 lb (109 kg)	Sr	Chicago, IL
G	52	Treysen Eaglestaff	6 ft 6 in (1.98 m)	190 lb (86 kg)	Jr	Bismarck, ND

Head coach

- Paul Sather (Northern State)

Assistant coach(es)

- Jamie Stevens (MSU Billings)
- Randall Herbst (Winona State)
- Estevan Sandoval (New Mexico)

Legend

- (C) Team captain
- (S) Suspended
- (I) Ineligible
- (W) Walk-on
- Injured
- Current redshirt

Roster
Last update: November 26, 2024

== Schedule and results ==
Date time, TV	Rank^{#}	Opponent^{#}	Result	Record	High points	High rebounds	High assists	Site (attendance) city, state
Exhibition
October 30, 2024; 7:00 p.m.		Concordia–Moorhead	W 89–56		26 – Eaglestaff	7 – Kuljuhovic	3 – Panoam	Betty Engelstad Sioux Center (1,666); Grand Forks, ND
Non-conference regular season
November 4, 2024*; 8:30 p.m., MWN		at Colorado State	L 56–82	0–1	12 – Eaglestaff	5 – Panoam	2 – Panoam	Moby Arena (4,060); Fort Collins, CO
November 12, 2024*; 5:00 p.m., Summit League Network		vs. Dickinson State; Capital City Classic	W 85–54	1–1	17 – Eaglestaff	7 – Panoam	4 – Thomas	Bismarck Event Center (1,200); Bismarck, ND
November 14, 2024*; 12:00 p.m., SLN		Utah Valley	W 77–71	2–1	31 – Eaglestaff	8 – King	4 – Kuljuhovic	Betty Engelstad Sioux Center (2,131); Grand Forks, ND
November 19, 2024*; 6:00 p.m., ACCNX		at Notre Dame	L 58–75	2–2	13 – Eaglestaff	9 – King	3 – Eaglestaff	Joyce Center (3,912); South Bend, IN
November 22, 2024*; 9:00 p.m., FloSports		at Loyola Marymount; Cancún Challenge campus game	W 77–73	3–2	23 – Eaglestaff	8 – Kuljuhovic	4 – Kuljuhovic	Gersten Pavilion (1,121); Los Angeles, CA
November 26, 2024*; 2:00 p.m., FloSports		vs. Bethune–Cookman; Cancún Challenge Mayan Division semifinals	L 67–79	3–3	20 – Eaglestaff	8 – Kuljuhovic	4 – Woodson	Hard Rock Hotel Riviera Maya (123); Riviera Maya, Mexico
November 27, 2024*; 11:30 a.m., FloSports		vs. Southeastern Louisiana; Cancún Challenge Mayan Division consolation game	L 60–76	3–4	14 – Kuljuhovic	7 – Kuljuhovic	4 – Kuljuhovic	Hard Rock Hotel Riviera Maya (123); Riviera Maya, Mexico
December 4, 2024*; 7:00 p.m., ESPN+		at Eastern Washington; Big Sky–Summit Challenge	L 81–87	3–5	24 – Eaglestaff	12 – Kuljuhovic	2 – King	Reese Court (1,400); Cheney, WA
December 7, 2024*; 7:00 p.m., SLN		Weber State; Big Sky–Summit Challenge	W 80–75	4–5	22 – Panoam	10 – Natsvishvili	4 – Panoam	Betty Engelstad Sioux Center (1,696); Grand Forks, ND
December 11, 2024*; 7:00 p.m., ESPN+		at Utah Valley	L 57–80	4–6	20 – Eaglestaff	6 – Mathews	2 – King	UCCU Center (2,135); Orem, UT
December 13, 2024*; 2:00 p.m., SLN		at UTSA; Rescheduled from November 9	L 76–80	4–7	21 – Woodson	11 – Mayar	7 – Panoam	Convocation Center (783); San Antonio, TX
December 15, 2024*; 2:00 p.m., SLN		UTSA	L 85–95	4–8	24 – Eaglestaff	10 – Mayar	6 – King	Betty Engelstad Sioux Center (1,613); Grand Forks, ND
December 18, 2024*; 8:00 p.m., CBSSN		No. 6 Alabama	L 90–97	4–9	40 – Eaglestaff	8 – Kuljuhovic	3 – Panoam	Betty Engelstad Sioux Center (3,085); Grand Forks, ND
December 20, 2024*; 7:00 p.m., SLN		South Dakota Mines	W 80–48	5–9	19 – Eaglestaff	7 – Kuljuhovic	3 – Thomas	Betty Engelstad Sioux Center (1,482); Grand Forks, ND
December 29, 2024*; 2:00 p.m., SLN		Waldorf (IA)	W 97–57	6–9	19 – Eaglestaff	11 – Mathews	5 – King	Betty Engelstad Sioux Center (1,570); Grand Forks, ND
Summit League regular season
January 2, 2025; 7:00 p.m., SLN		Omaha	L 85–95	6–10 (0–1)	24 – Panoam	8 – Kuljuhovic	5 – Panoam	Betty Engelstad Sioux Center (1,592); Grand Forks, ND
January 4, 2024; 1:00 p.m., SLN		St. Thomas	L 80–88	6–11 (0–2)	20 – Panoam	12 – Panoam	6 – Panoam	Betty Engelstad Sioux Center (1,648); Grand Forks, ND
January 9, 2025; 8:00 p.m., SLN		at Denver	W 95–70	7–11 (1–2)	28 – Panoam	8 – Kuljuhovic	4 – King	Hamilton Gymnasium (698); Denver, CO
January 11, 2025; 7:00 p.m., SLN		at Oral Roberts	L 79–83	7–12 (1–3)	17 – Kuljuhovic	6 – 2 tied	5 – Eaglestaff	Mabee Center (3,423); Tulsa, OK
January 16, 2025; 7:00 p.m., SLN		at South Dakota State	L 73–109	7–13 (1–4)	14 – Kuljuhovic	6 – Panoam	4 – Eaglestaff	First Bank & Trust Arena (3,261); Brookings, SD
January 18, 2025; 1:00 p.m., SLN		Kansas City	W 76–72	8–13 (2–4)	21 – Panoam	10 – Panoam	4 – King	Betty Engelstad Sioux Center (1,994); Grand Forks, ND
January 23, 2025; 7:00 p.m., SLN		South Dakota	L 93–102	8–14 (2–5)	25 – Panoam	11 – Kuljuhovic	7 – Panoam	Betty Engelstad Sioux Center (1,907); Grand Forks, ND
January 25, 2025; 4:00 p.m., SLN		at North Dakota State	L 82–87	8–15 (2–6)	22 – Eaglestaff	13 – King	3 – 2 tied	Scheels Center (5,198); Fargo, ND
February 1, 2025; 1:00 p.m., SLN		South Dakota State	W 80–75	9–15 (3–6)	24 – King	6 – Kuljuhovic	3 – Mathews	Betty Engelstad Sioux Center (2,025); Grand Forks, ND
February 6, 2025; 7:00 p.m., SLN		at Omaha	L 77–80	9–16 (3–7)	17 – 2 tied	7 – Kuljuhovic	5 – Kuljuhovic	Baxter Arena (2,508); Omaha, NE
February 8, 2025; 7:00 p.m., SLN		at Kansas City	L 69–80	9–17 (3–8)	24 – Eaglestaff	12 – Panoam	5 – Kuljuhovic	Swinney Recreation Center (1,058); Kansas City, MO
February 13, 2025; 7:00 p.m., SLN		Denver	L 64–68	9–18 (3–9)	29 – Eaglestaff	10 – Panoam	3 – 2 tied	Betty Engelstad Sioux Center (1,814); Grand Forks, ND
February 15, 2025; 1:00 p.m., SLN		Oral Roberts	W 88–77	10–18 (4–9)	24 – King	9 – 2 tied	3 – Kuljuhovic	Betty Engelstad Sioux Center (1,817); Grand Forks, ND
February 22, 2025; 1:00 p.m., SLN		North Dakota State	W 79–77	11–18 (5–9)	27 – Eaglestaff	8 – King	5 – King	Betty Engelstad Sioux Center (2,517); Grand Forks, ND
February 27, 2025; 7:00 p.m., SLN		at St. Thomas	L 71–86	11–19 (5–10)	18 – Mara	7 – 2 tied	6 – Panoam	Shoenecker Arena (1,752); St. Paul, MN
March 1, 2025; 4:00 p.m., SLN		at South Dakota	L 79–92	11–20 (5–11)	16 – Panoam	7 – 2 tied	5 – Eaglestaff	Sanford Coyote Sports Center (2,659); Vermillion, SD
Summit League tournament
March 7, 2025; 8:30 p.m., MidcoSN/SLN	(6)	vs. (3) South Dakota State; Quarterfinal	W 85–69	12–20	51 – Eaglestaff	9 – Kuljuhovic	4 – Eaglestaff	Denny Sanford Premier Center (9,202); Sioux Falls, SD
March 8, 2025; 9:45 p.m., CBSSN	(6)	vs. (2) St. Thomas; Semifinal	L 69–85	12–21	15 – King	8 – Panoam	5 – Eaglestaff	Denny Sanford Premier Center (8,345); Sioux Falls, SD
*Non-conference game. ^{#}Rankings from AP poll. (#) Tournament seedings in parentheses. All times are in Central.
