= 2024–25 Oral Roberts Golden Eagles men's basketball team =

American college basketball season

2024–25 Oral Roberts Golden Eagles men's basketball
- Conference: Summit League
- Record: 7–23 (3–13 Summit)
- Head coach: Russell Springmann (2nd season)
- Assistant coaches: Sam Patterson; Antonio Bostic; Bill Lewis
- Home arena: Mabee Center

2024–25 Summit League men's basketball standings
	Conf.				Overall
Team	W		L	PCT	W		L	PCT
Omaha †	13	–	3	.813	22	–	13	.629
St. Thomas *	12	–	4	.750	24	–	10	.706
South Dakota State	11	–	5	.688	20	–	12	.625
North Dakota State	10	–	6	.625	21	–	11	.656
South Dakota	9	–	7	.563	19	–	14	.576
North Dakota	5	–	11	.313	12	–	21	.364
Denver	5	–	11	.313	11	–	21	.344
Kansas City	4	–	12	.250	13	–	20	.394
Oral Roberts	3	–	13	.188	7	–	23	.233
† 2025 Summit League tournament winner * Ineligible for the 2025 NCAA tournament due to transition from Division III

The 2024–25 Oral Roberts Golden Eagles men's basketball team represented Oral Roberts University during the 2024–25 NCAA Division I men's basketball season. The Golden Eagles, led by second-year head coach Russell Springmann, played their home games at the Mabee Center in Tulsa, Oklahoma, as members of the Summit League.

After a dismal 7–22 regular season record, coupled with an opening round loss to Kansas City in the Summit League tournament, the Golden Eagles fired head coach Russell Springmann on March 7, 2025, after two seasons.

== Previous season ==
The Golden Eagles finished the 2023–24 season 12–19, 5–11 in Summit League play to finish in eighth place. In the Summit League tournament, Oral Roberts defeated South Dakota in the first round before losing to South Dakota State in the quarterfinals.

== Roster ==
2024–25 Oral Roberts Golden Eagles men's basketball team
Players
Coaches

Pos.	#	Name	Height	Weight	Year	Hometown
G	0	JoJo Moore	6 ft 5 in (1.96 m)	195 lb (88 kg)	Fr	Leander, TX
F	1	Braeden Moore	6 ft 8 in (2.03 m)	226 lb (103 kg)	RS So	Nashville, TN
G	2	Chase Martin	6 ft 5 in (1.96 m)	205 lb (93 kg)	Jr	Jenks, OK
F	4	Jackson Skipper	6 ft 7 in (2.01 m)	170 lb (77 kg)	So	Tulsa, OK
G	5	Darius Robinson Jr.	6 ft 1 in (1.85 m)	160 lb (73 kg)	Jr	Chicago, IL
G	7	Pablo Navarro	6 ft 6 in (1.98 m)	205 lb (93 kg)	So	Valencia, ESP
G	10	Issac McBride	6 ft 1 in (1.85 m)	173 lb (78 kg)	GS	Little Rock, AR
C	11	Mathok Majok	7 ft 3 in (2.21 m)	210 lb (95 kg)	So	South Sudan
G	12	Jalen Miller	6 ft 2 in (1.88 m)	202 lb (92 kg)	Sr	Frederick, MD
F	13	Carlos Rosario	6 ft 7 in (2.01 m)	180 lb (82 kg)	RS Jr	Santo Domingo, SD
C	22	Josh Jones	6 ft 10 in (2.08 m)	240 lb (109 kg)	So	Austin, TX
F	23	Sir Issac Herron	6 ft 9 in (2.06 m)	230 lb (104 kg)	RS Jr	Houston, TX
F	25	Luke Gray	6 ft 7 in (2.01 m)	—	Fr	Edmond, OK
G	33	Seth Kruse	6 ft 3 in (1.91 m)	176 lb (80 kg)	So	Tulsa, OK
G	34	Naim Ibroci	6 ft 2 in (1.88 m)	165 lb (75 kg)	Fr	Staten Island, NY
G	35	Nevin Ibroci	6 ft 2 in (1.88 m)	165 lb (75 kg)	Fr	Staten Island, NY
F	64	Sam Alajiki	6 ft 7 in (2.01 m)	—	Sr	Dundalk, IRE

Head coach

- Russell Springmann (Salisbury)

Assistant coach(es)

- Sam Patterson (Baylor)
- Antonio Bostic (Stephen F. Austin)
- Bill Lewit (Salisbury)

Legend

- (C) Team captain
- (S) Suspended
- (I) Ineligible
- (W) Walk-on
- Injured
- Current redshirt

Roster
Last update: October 14, 2024

== Schedule and results ==
Date time, TV	Rank^{#}	Opponent^{#}	Result	Record	Site (attendance) city, state
Non–league regular season
November 6, 2024*; 7:00 pm, B1G+		at Minnesota	L 57–80	0–1	Williams Arena (6,975); Minneapolis, MN
November 8, 2024*; 7:00 pm, KGEB/Summit League Network		Ozark Christian	W 105–49	1–1	Mabee Center; Tulsa, OK
November 13, 2024*; 7:00 pm, ESPN+		at Tulsa; Mayor's Cup	L 76–85	1–2	Reynolds Center (3,906); Tulsa, OK
November 16, 2024*; 7:00 pm, SLN		Haskell Indian Nations	W 87–52	2–2	Mabee Center (4,811); Tulsa, OK
November 19, 2024*; 6:30 pm, ESPN+		at Belmont	L 80–90	2–3	Curb Event Center; Nashville, TN
November 21, 2024*; 7:00 pm, SECN+		at Ole Miss	L 68–100	2–4	SJB Pavilion (6,873); Oxford, MS
November 25, 2024*; 7:30 pm, SLN		Rogers State	L 68–69	2–5	Mabee Center; Tulsa, OK
December 1, 2024*; 3:00 pm, KGEB/SLN		Missouri State	L 67–72	2–6	Mabee Center (3,368); Tulsa, OK
December 4, 2024*; 7:00 pm, KGEB/SLN		Northern Arizona; Big Sky–Summit Challenge	W 83–76	3–6	Mabee Center (2,934); Tulsa, OK
December 7, 2024*; 7:00 pm, ESPN+		at Idaho State; Big Sky–Summit Challenge	L 55–71	3–7	Reed Gym (1,072); Pocatello, ID
December 16, 2024*; 7:00 pm, ESPN+		at Texas Tech	L 50–86	3–8	United Supermarkets Arena (9,967); Lubbock, TX
December 22, 2024*; 2:00 pm, ESPN+		at Oklahoma State	L 74–86	3–9	Gallagher-Iba Arena (6,349); Stillwater, OK
December 30, 2024*; 7:00 pm, SLN		Texas A&M–Texarkana	W 92–54	4–9	Mabee Center (4,011); Tulsa, OK
League regular season
January 4, 2025; 5:00 pm, SLN		at Kansas City	L 67–90	4–10 (0–1)	Swinney Recreation Center (614); Kansas City, MO
January 9, 2025; 7:00 pm, SLN		North Dakota State	L 96–110	4–11 (0–2)	Mabee Center (2,197); Tulsa, OK
January 11, 2025; 7:00 pm, KGEB/SLN		North Dakota	W 83–79	5–11 (1–2)	Mabee Center (3,423); Tulsa, OK
January 16, 2025; 7:00 pm, SLN		at South Dakota	L 82–92	5–12 (1–3)	Sanford Coyote Sports Center (2,119); Vermillion, SD
January 18, 2025; 4:15 pm, SLN		at South Dakota State	L 70–84	5–13 (1–4)	First Bank & Trust Arena (3,681); Brookings, SD
January 23, 2025; 7:00 pm, SLN		Denver	L 68–70	5–14 (1–5)	Mabee Center (2,264); Tulsa, OK
January 25, 2025; 7:00 pm, GEB Network/SLN		Omaha	L 76–84	5–15 (1–6)	Mabee Center (4,008); Tulsa, OK
January 29, 2025; 7:00 pm, SLN		at St. Thomas	L 71–86	5–16 (1–7)	Shoenecker Arena (1,042); St. Paul, MN
February 1, 2025; 7:00 pm, KGEB/SLN		Kansas City	W 73–67	6–16 (2–7)	Mabee Center (4,035); Tulsa, OK
February 8, 2025; 7:00 pm, KGEB/SLN		South Dakota	L 74–75	6–17 (2–8)	Mabee Center (3,009); Tulsa, OK
February 13, 2025; 8:00 pm, CBS Sports Network		at North Dakota State	L 88–90 ^{OT}	6–18 (2–9)	Scheels Center (1,103); Fargo, ND
February 15, 2025; 1:00 pm, SLN		at North Dakota	L 77–88	6–19 (2–10)	Betty Engelstad Sioux Center (1,817); Grand Forks, ND
February 19, 2025; 8:00 pm, SLN		at Denver	L 60–71	6–20 (2–11)	Hamilton Gymnasium (605); Denver, CO
February 22, 2025; 7:00 pm, SLN		St. Thomas	W 71–66	7–20 (3–11)	Mabee Center (4,527); Tulsa, OK
February 27, 2025; 7:00 pm, KGEB/SLN		South Dakota State	L 69–77	7–21 (3–12)	Mabee Center (3,281); Tulsa, OK
March 1, 2025; 1:00 pm, SLN		at Omaha	L 57–80	7–22 (3–13)	Baxter Arena (4,127); Omaha, NE
Summit League tournament
March 5, 2025; 7:00 pm, SLN	(9)	vs. (8) Kansas City; First round	L 56–73	7–23	Denny Sanford Premier Center (3,917); Sioux Falls, SD
*Non-conference game. ^{#}Rankings from AP poll. (#) Tournament seedings in parentheses. All times are in Central.
