= 2024–25 St. Thomas Tommies (Minnesota) men's basketball team =

American college basketball season

2024–25 St. Thomas (Minnesota) Tommies men's basketball
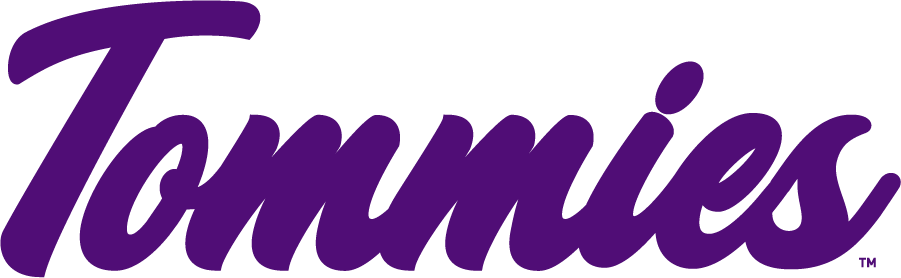
- Conference: Summit League
- Record: 24–10 (12–4 Summit)
- Head coach: John Tauer (14th season)
- Associate head coach: Mike Maker
- Assistant coaches: Cameron Rundles; Kenneth Lowe
- Home arena: Schoenecker Arena

2024–25 Summit League men's basketball standings
	Conf.				Overall
Team	W		L	PCT	W		L	PCT
Omaha †	13	–	3	.813	22	–	13	.629
St. Thomas *	12	–	4	.750	24	–	10	.706
South Dakota State	11	–	5	.688	20	–	12	.625
North Dakota State	10	–	6	.625	21	–	11	.656
South Dakota	9	–	7	.563	19	–	14	.576
North Dakota	5	–	11	.313	12	–	21	.364
Denver	5	–	11	.313	11	–	21	.344
Kansas City	4	–	12	.250	13	–	20	.394
Oral Roberts	3	–	13	.188	7	–	23	.233
† 2025 Summit League tournament winner * Ineligible for the 2025 NCAA tournament due to transition from Division III

The 2024–25 St. Thomas Tommies men's basketball team represented the University of St. Thomas in the 2024–25 NCAA Division I men's basketball season. The Tommies, led by 14th-year head coach John Tauer, played their home games at Schoenecker Arena in Saint Paul, Minnesota as members of the Summit League.

This season originally marked St. Thomas's fourth year of a five-year transition period from Division III to Division I, an incredibly rare and historic jump that bypasses Division II altogether. However on January 15, 2025 the NCAA voted to amend the reclassification timeline for transitioning Division I institutions, reducing the Division III to Division I transition period from five years to four. With the transition period timeline amended, St. Thomas would be eligible for NCAA postseason play in the 2025–26 season as long as the university is able to meet the new standards set (such as academic requirements).

The Tommies participated in the Summit League men's basketball tournament for the third time since moving to Division I in 2021, doing so as the 2nd seed in the conference (their highest placement since their move to Division I). They defeated 7th-seeded Denver in the quarterfinals and 6th-seeded North Dakota in the semifinals before they were defeated by 1st-seeded Omaha in their first appearance in the Summit League Championship.

Additionally, this season marked the final year the Tommies played their home games in Schoenecker Arena (finishing the year with a perfect 14–0 record at home) as a new on-campus arena, the Lee and Penny Anderson Arena is set to open in time for the start of the 2025–26 season.

== Previous season ==
The Tommies finished the 2023–24 season 20–13, 9–7 in Summit League play, to finish in fourth place. They played in their second-ever Division I postseason tournament, the Summit League tournament where they defeated North Dakota State in the quarterfinals before losing to South Dakota State in the semifinals.

== Roster ==
2024–25 St. Thomas (Minnesota) Tommies men's basketball team
Players
Coaches

Pos.	#	Name	Height	Weight	Year	Previous school	Hometown
G	0	Ryan Lafferty	6 ft 5 in (1.96 m)	195 lb (88 kg)	Fr	Mt. Spokane High School	Spokane, WA
G	1	Kendall Blue	6 ft 6 in (1.98 m)	190 lb (86 kg)	Jr	East Ridge High School	Woodbury, MN
G	2	Ben Nau	6 ft 2 in (1.88 m)	190 lb (86 kg)	Sr	Brookfield Central High School	Brookfield, WI
G	3	Hayden Tibbits	5 ft 11 in (1.8 m)	165 lb (75 kg)	RS Fr	Wayzata High School	Medina, MN
G	4	Nolan Minessale	6 ft 5 in (1.96 m)	180 lb (82 kg)	Fr	Marquette University High School	Brookfield, WI
G	5	Tim Franks	6 ft 5 in (1.96 m)	190 lb (86 kg)	Fr	Homestead High School	Mequon, WI
G	10	Jermaine Coleman	6 ft 7 in (2.01 m)	205 lb (93 kg)	RS Fr	Park Tudor School	Indianapolis, IN
G	11	Drake Dobbs	6 ft 2 in (1.88 m)	175 lb (79 kg)	GS	Eden Prairie High School	Eden Prairie, MN
G	12	Ryan Dufault	6 ft 0 in (1.83 m)	185 lb (84 kg)	Sr	Waseca High School	Waseca, MN
G	14	Miles Barnstable	6 ft 2 in (1.88 m)	180 lb (82 kg)	Jr	Howards Grove High School	Sheboygan, WI
G	15	Adam Tauer	6 ft 3 in (1.91 m)	175 lb (79 kg)	RS Fr	Cretin-Derham Hall High School	St. Paul, MN
F	22	Ramogi Nyagudi	6 ft 8 in (2.03 m)	185 lb (84 kg)	Fr	DME Academy at St. John's Northwestern	Winnipeg, MB
F	24	Kyle Counts	6 ft 7 in (2.01 m)	195 lb (88 kg)	Fr	Wilsonville High School	Wilsonville, OR
F	32	Carter Bjerke	6 ft 9 in (2.06 m)	250 lb (113 kg)	RS So	Wayzata High School	Plymouth, MN
F	33	Rich Byhre	6 ft 8 in (2.03 m)	230 lb (104 kg)	GS	Catholic Memorial High School	Delafield, WI
G	34	Ben Oosterbaan	6 ft 6 in (1.98 m)	195 lb (88 kg)	RS Fr	Hinsdale Central High School	Hinsdale, IL

Head coach

- John Tauer (St. Thomas (MN))

Assistant coach(es)

- Mike Maker (Cal Baptist)
- Cameron Rundles (Wofford)
- Kenneth Lowe (Purdue)

Legend

- (C) Team captain
- (S) Suspended
- (I) Ineligible
- (W) Walk-on
- Injured
- Current redshirt

Roster
Last update: October 15, 2024

== Schedule and results ==
Date time, TV	Rank^{#}	Opponent^{#}	Result	Record	High points	High rebounds	High assists	Site (attendance) city, state
Non-conference regular season
November 4, 2024*; 8:00 p.m., Summit League Network		North Central (MN)	W 96–71	1–0	16 – Barnstable	10 – Oosterbaan	5 – Dobbs	Schoenecker Arena (1,353); St. Paul, MN
November 8, 2024*; 6:00 p.m., ESPN+		at Green Bay	W 90–76	2–0	23 – Barnstable	6 – Byhre	4 – 2 tied	Kress Events Center (2,060); Green Bay, WI
November 10, 2024*; 2:00 p.m., ESPN+		at Oklahoma State	L 71–80	2–1	18 – Blue	11 – Blue	3 – 2 tied	Gallagher-Iba Arena (5,447); Stillwater, OK
November 15, 2024*; 7:00 p.m., SLN		St. Norbert	W 102–54	3–1	19 – Oosterbaan	6 – Byhre	6 – Lafferty	Schoenecker Arena (1,004); St. Paul, MN
November 17, 2024*; 7:00 p.m., ESPN+		at Arizona State	L 66–81	3–2	12 – Barnstable	5 – Minessale	4 – 2 tied	Desert Financial Arena (6,057); Tempe, AZ
November 22, 2024*; 4:00 p.m., YouTube		vs. Wofford; Cream City Challenge	L 73–81	3–3	20 – Bjerke	5 – Byhre	4 – 2 tied	UW–Milwaukee Panther Arena (1,342); Milwaukee, WI
November 23, 2024*; 12:00 p.m., YouTube		vs. Portland State; Cream City Challenge	W 91–65	4–3	18 – Nau	5 – 2 tied	6 – Dufault	UW–Milwaukee Panther Arena (1,638); Milwaukee, WI
November 24, 2024*; 1:30 p.m., ESPN+		at Milwaukee; Cream City Challenge	L 65–69	4–4	16 – Dobbs	5 – 2 tied	5 – Dobbs	UW–Milwaukee Panther Arena (1,669); Milwaukee, WI
December 2, 2024*; 7:00 p.m., SLN		Chicago State	W 98–76	5–4	13 – 2 tied	7 – Minessale	4 – 2 tied	Schoenecker Arena (879); St. Paul, MN
December 4, 2024*; 7:00 p.m., ESPN+		at Northern Colorado; Big Sky–Summit Challenge	W 87–75	6–4	20 – Barnstable	6 – Bjerke	3 – Barnstable	Bank of Colorado Arena (1,020); Greeley, CO
December 7, 2024*; 2:00 p.m., FOX 9+/SLN		Montana; Big Sky–Summit Challenge	W 88–81	7–4	22 – 2 tied	5 – Barnstable	6 – Dobbs	Schoenecker Arena (1,213); St. Paul, MN
December 13, 2024*; 7:00 p.m., SLN		Western Michigan	W 77–71	8–4	22 – Nau	6 – Blue	4 – 2 tied	Schoenecker Arena (1,092); St. Paul, MN
December 15, 2024*; 2:00 p.m., SLN		Crown (MN)	W 100–61	9–4	15 – Byhre	13 – Lafferty	6 – Lafferty	Schoenecker Arena (793); St. Paul, MN
December 21, 2024*; 1:00 p.m., ESPN+		at Bowling Green	W 93–68	10–4	23 – Barnstable	7 – 2 tied	5 – Dobbs	Stroh Center (1,998); Bowling Green, OH
December 29, 2024*; 4:00 p.m., ESPN+		at UC Riverside	L 79–81 ^{OT}	10–5	27 – Minessale	4 – 4 tied	3 – Dobbs	UC Riverside Student Recreation Center (563); Riverside, CA
Summit League regular season
January 2, 2025; 7:00 p.m., SLN		at North Dakota State	W 89–85	11–5 (1–0)	20 – Barnstable	4 – 2 tied	5 – Minessale	Scheels Center (1,492); Fargo, ND
January 4, 2025; 1:00 p.m., SLN		at North Dakota	W 88–80	12–5 (2–0)	30 – Barnstable	8 – Minnesale	5 – Dobbs	Betty Engelstad Sioux Center (1,648); Grand Forks, ND
January 8, 2025; 8:00 p.m., FOX 9+/SLN		South Dakota State	W 73–72	13–5 (3–0)	17 – Minessale	4 – 2 tied	5 – Dobbs	Schoenecker Arena (1,852); St. Paul, MN
January 11, 2025; 7:00 p.m., SLN		South Dakota	W 119–104	14–5 (4–0)	28 – Barnstable	5 – Bjerke	9 – Dobbs	Schoenecker Arena (1,583); St. Paul, MN
January 18, 2025; 7:00 p.m., SLN		Denver	W 74–62	15–5 (5–0)	17 – Minessale	8 – Blue	3 – 2 tied	Schoenecker Arena (1,694); St. Paul, MN
January 23, 2025; 7:00 p.m., SLN		at Omaha	L 78–89	15–6 (5–1)	18 – Blue	9 – Blue	2 – 4 tied	Baxter Arena (3,234); Omaha, NE
January 25, 2025; 7:00 p.m., SLN		at Kansas City	W 68–65	16–6 (6–1)	16 – Barnstable	8 – 2 tied	4 – Dobbs	Swinney Recreation Center (1,534); Kansas City, MO
January 29, 2025; 7:00 p.m., SLN		Oral Roberts	W 86–71	17–6 (7–1)	23 – Barnstable	7 – 2 tied	5 – Blue	Schoenecker Arena (1,042); St. Paul, MN
February 2, 2025; 3:00 p.m., CBS Sports Network		North Dakota State	W 79–62	18–6 (8–1)	23 – Minessale	9 – Barnstable	4 – Dobbs	Schoenecker Arena (2,068); St. Paul, MN
February 6, 2025; 7:00 p.m., SLN		at South Dakota State	L 86–102	18–7 (8–2)	23 – Dobbs	4 – 3 tied	4 – Blue	First Bank & Trust Arena (3,144); Brookings, SD
February 8, 2025; 3:00 p.m., SLN		at Denver	W 79–76	19–7 (9–2)	21 – Dobbs	4 – 2 tied	4 – Dobbs	Hamilton Gymnasium (977); Denver, CO
February 15, 2025; 7:00 p.m., FOX 9+/SLN		Omaha	W 95–84	20–7 (10–2)	23 – Dobbs	4 – 2 tied	5 – Minessale	Schoenecker Arena (2,008); St. Paul, MN
February 19, 2025; 7:00 p.m., SLN		at South Dakota	L 80–85	20–8 (10–3)	16 – Barnstable	5 – Bjerke	5 – Minessale	Sanford Coyote Sports Center (1,814); Vermillion, SD
February 22, 2025; 7:00 p.m., SLN		at Oral Roberts	L 66–71	20–9 (10–4)	17 – Minessale	7 – Bjerke	4 – Minessale	Mabee Center (4,527); Tulsa, OK
February 27, 2025; 7:00 p.m., SLN		North Dakota	W 86–71	21–9 (11–4)	25 – Barnstable	10 – Blue	5 – Blue	Schoenecker Arena (1,752); St. Paul, MN
March 1, 2025; 7:00 p.m., SLN		Kansas City	W 65–59	22–9 (12–4)	22 – Blue	6 – 2 tied	3 – Dobbs	Schoenecker Arena (1,783); St. Paul, MN
Summit League tournament
March 6, 2025; 8:30 p.m., SLN	(2)	vs. (7) Denver; Quarterfinals	W 80–62	23–9	17 – Barnstable	7 – Byhre	8 – Dobbs	Denny Sanford Premier Center (5,814); Sioux Falls, SD
March 8, 2025; 9:45 p.m., CBSSN	(2)	vs. (6) North Dakota; Semifinals	W 85–69	24–9	21 – Blue	5 – Barnstable	5 – Dobbs	Denny Sanford Premier Center (8,345); Sioux Falls, SD
March 9, 2025; 8:00 p.m., CBSSN	(2)	vs. (1) Omaha; Championship	L 75–85	24–10	20 – Minessale	8 – Blue	3 – 2 tied	Denny Sanford Premier Center (7,597); Sioux Falls, SD
*Non-conference game. ^{#}Rankings from AP poll. (#) Tournament seedings in parentheses. All times are in Central.
