= 2024–25 North Dakota State Bison men's basketball team =

American college basketball season

2024–25 North Dakota State Bison men's basketball
- Conference: Summit League
- Record: 21–11 (10–6 Summit)
- Head coach: David Richman (11th season)
- Associate head coach: Luke Strege
- Assistant coaches: Joshua Jones; Spencer Wilker; Camron Greer
- Home arena: Scheels Center

2024–25 Summit League men's basketball standings
	Conf.				Overall
Team	W		L	PCT	W		L	PCT
Omaha †	13	–	3	.813	22	–	13	.629
St. Thomas *	12	–	4	.750	24	–	10	.706
South Dakota State	11	–	5	.688	20	–	12	.625
North Dakota State	10	–	6	.625	21	–	11	.656
South Dakota	9	–	7	.563	19	–	14	.576
North Dakota	5	–	11	.313	12	–	21	.364
Denver	5	–	11	.313	11	–	21	.344
Kansas City	4	–	12	.250	13	–	20	.394
Oral Roberts	3	–	13	.188	7	–	23	.233
† 2025 Summit League tournament winner * Ineligible for the 2025 NCAA tournament due to transition from Division III

The 2024–25 North Dakota State Bison men's basketball team represented North Dakota State University during the 2024–25 NCAA Division I men's basketball season. The Bison, led by 11th-year head coach David Richman, played their home games at the Scheels Center, as members of the Summit League.

NDSU made the Summit League tournament as the 4 seed. They lost to 5th seeded South Dakota in the quarterfinals to be eliminated from postseason contention.

== Previous season ==
The Bison finished the 2023–24 season 15–17, 8–8 in Summit League play to finish in fifth place. In the Summit League tournament, they lost to St. Thomas in the quarterfinals.

== Offseason ==
=== Departures ===
Name	Number	Pos.	Height	Weight	Year	Hometown	Reason for departure
Lance Waddles	12	G	6'3"	190	Sophomore	Shreveport, LA	Transferred to Omaha
Boden Skunberg	14	G	6'5"	210	Senior	Jamestown, ND	Transferred to Illinois State
Joshua Streit	22	F	6'9"	245	Junior	Watkins, MN	Transferred to Omaha
Andrew Morgan	23	F	6'10"	245	Junior	Waseca, MN	Transferred to Nebraska
Ryan Sletten	24	G	6'4"	190	Sophomore	Larimore, ND	Graduated
Sam Hastreiter	33	F	6'7"	220	Sophomore	Lincoln, NE	Transferred to Minnesota State–Moorhead

=== Incoming transfers ===
Name	Number	Pos.	Height	Weight	Year	Hometown	Previous School
Luke Kasubke	0	G	6'5"	190	Senior	St. Louis, MO	Illinois State
Brennan Watkins	3	G	5'11"	180	Junior	Kearney, MO	VMI
Jacksen Moni	4	F	6'10"	235	Senior	Fargo, ND	Northern State (Div. II)
Masen Miller	12	G	6'2"	195	Senior	Iowa City, IA	Indiana State
Patrick Bath	24	F	6'9"	235	RS Freshman	Fargo, ND	Drake

=== 2024 recruiting class ===
College recruiting
Name	Hometown	School	Height	Weight	Commit date
Andy Stefonowicz; G	Minnetonka, Minnesota	Minnetonka High School	6 ft 1 in (1.85 m)	165 lb (75 kg)	Jun 15, 2023
Andy Stefonowicz; G	Recruit ratings: Scout: Rivals: 247Sports: ESPN: (0)				
Carson Smith; G	Bountiful, Utah	Bountiful High School	6 ft 7 in (2.01 m)	205 lb (93 kg)	Apr 1, 2024
Carson Smith; G	Recruit ratings: Scout: Rivals: 247Sports: ESPN: (0)				
Treyson Anderson; F	Lincoln, Nebraska	Pius X High School	6 ft 10 in (2.08 m)	240 lb (110 kg)	Jun 12, 2023
Treyson Anderson; F	Recruit ratings: Scout: Rivals: 247Sports: ESPN: (0)				
Overall recruit ranking:
Note: In many cases, Scout, Rivals, 247Sports, On3, and ESPN may conflict in their listings of height and weight.; In these cases, the average was taken. ESPN grades are on a 100-point scale.; Sources: "2024 Team Ranking". Rivals.

== Roster ==
2024–25 North Dakota State Bison men's basketball team
Players
Coaches

Pos.	#	Name	Height	Weight	Year	Previous school	Hometown
G	0	Luke Kasubke	6 ft 5 in (1.96 m)	190 lb (86 kg)	Sr	Illinois State	St. Louis, MO
F	2	Jeremiah Burke	6 ft 7 in (2.01 m)	215 lb (98 kg)	Sr	Iowa Lakes Community College	Milwaukee, WI
G	3	Brennan Watkins	5 ft 11 in (1.8 m)	180 lb (82 kg)	Jr	VMI	Kearney, MO
F	4	Jacksen Moni	6 ft 10 in (2.08 m)	235 lb (107 kg)	Sr	Northern State	Fargo, ND
G	5	Andy Stefonowicz	6 ft 1 in (1.85 m)	165 lb (75 kg)	Fr	Minnetonka High School	Minnetonka, MN
G	10	Damari Wheeler–Thomas	6 ft 0 in (1.83 m)	190 lb (86 kg)	Jr	Larkin High School	Elgin, IL
G	11	Jacari White	6 ft 3 in (1.91 m)	175 lb (79 kg)	Sr	State College of Florida	Orlando, FL
G	12	Masen Miller	6 ft 2 in (1.88 m)	195 lb (88 kg)	Sr	Indiana State	Iowa City, IA
G	13	Darik Dissette	6 ft 4 in (1.93 m)	185 lb (84 kg)	So	Minot High School	Minot, ND
G	14	Eli Bradley	6 ft 3 in (1.91 m)	180 lb (82 kg)	RS Fr	Bishop Gorman High School	Las Vegas, NV
G	21	Tajavis Miller	6 ft 4 in (1.93 m)	200 lb (91 kg)	Jr	Frenship High School	Lubbock, TX
G	23	Carson Smith	6 ft 7 in (2.01 m)	205 lb (93 kg)	Fr	Bountiful High School	Bountiful, UT
F	24	Patrick Bath	6 ft 9 in (2.06 m)	235 lb (107 kg)	RS Fr	Drake	Fargo, ND
F	34	Noah Feddersen	6 ft 10 in (2.08 m)	250 lb (113 kg)	So	Menomonie High School	Menomonie, WI
F	44	Treyson Anderson	6 ft 10 in (2.08 m)	240 lb (109 kg)	Fr	Pius X High School	Lincoln, NE

Head coach

- David Richman (North Dakota State)

Assistant coach(es)

- Luke Strege (Wisconsin-La Crosse)
- Joshua Jones (Eastern Kentucky)
- Spencer Wilker (North Dakota State)
- Camron Greer (North Dakota State)

Legend

- (C) Team captain
- (S) Suspended
- (I) Ineligible
- (W) Walk-on
- Injured
- Current redshirt

Roster

== Schedule and results ==
Date time, TV	Rank^{#}	Opponent^{#}	Result	Record	High points	High rebounds	High assists	Site (attendance) city, state
Exhibition
October 23, 2024*; 7:00 pm, WDAY Xtra/Summit League Network		Minnesota State–Moorhead	W 67–63	–	17 – Watkins	9 – Feddersen	2 – Tied	Scheels Center (1,728); Fargo, ND
Non-conference regular season
November 4, 2024; 7:00 pm, WDAY Xtra/SLN		Jamestown	W 96–59	1–0	22 – White	9 – Anderson	6 – Stefonowicz	Scheels Center (1,219); Fargo, ND
November 7, 2024*; 7:30 pm, WDAY Xtra/SLN		Illinois State	L 68–77	1–1	27 – White	5 – Tied	5 – Moni	Scheels Center (1,353); Fargo, ND
November 11, 2024*; 8:30 pm, ESPN+		at Cal State Bakersfield	L 81–86	1–2	22 – White	6 – Feddersen	5 – Moni	Icardo Center (720); Bakersfield, CA
November 13, 2024*; 9:00 pm, ESPN+		at Santa Clara	W 88–80 ^{OT}	2–2	19 – Moni	8 – Feddersen	5 – White	Leavey Center (1,628); Santa Clara, CA
November 18, 2024*; 7:00 pm, ESPN+		at Southern Illinois	L 44–69	2–3	9 – White	9 – Kasubke	4 – White	Banterra Center (4,553); Carbondale, IL
November 21, 2024*; 7:00 pm, ABC ND/SLN		Minnesota–Crookston	W 67–60	3–3	16 – Tied	7 – Tied	4 – M. Miller	Scheels Center (917); Fargo, ND
November 26, 2024*; 6:30 pm, ESPN+		at Samford; Samford Thanksgiving Invitational	L 98–103 ^{OT}	3–4	30 – White	8 – Feddersen	6 – Watkins	Pete Hanna Center (1,213); Homewood, AL
November 27, 2024*; 3:00 pm, ESPN+		vs. West Georgia; Samford Thanksgiving Invitational	W 73–61	4–4	17 – Feddersen	9 – Feddersen	4 – Tied	Pete Hanna Center (123); Homewood, AL
November 28, 2024*; 2:00 pm, ESPN+		vs. Utah Valley; Samford Thanksgiving Invitational	W 83–63	5–4	32 – Moni	6 – Moni	4 – M. Miller	Pete Hanna Center (121); Homewood, AL
December 4, 2024*; 8:00 pm, ESPN+		at Weber State; Big Sky–Summit Challenge	W 77–73	6–4	22 – Moni	9 – White	4 – White	Dee Events Center (3,291); Ogden, UT
December 7, 2024*; 7:00 pm, WDAY Xtra/SLN		Northern Colorado; Big Sky–Summit Challenge	W 82–70	7–4	18 – Moni	11 – Feddersen	4 – Moni	Scheels Center (1,242); Fargo, ND
December 10, 2024*; 5:30 pm, FS1		at Butler	W 71–68	8–4	27 – White	7 – Tied	6 – Watkins	Hinkle Fieldhouse (6,980); Indianapolis, IN
December 13, 2024*; 12:00 pm, WDAY Xtra/SLN		Wisconsin–Stout	W 91–62	9–4	25 – Moni	10 – Feddersen	4 – Watkins	Scheels Center; Fargo, ND
December 15, 2024*; 1:00 pm, WDAY Xtra/SLN		Western Michigan	W 98–62	10–4	19 – White	7 – Feddersen	7 – Moni	Scheels Center (1,009); Fargo, ND
December 23, 2024*; 7:00 pm, WDAY Xtra/SLN		Cal State Bakersfield	W 94–60	11–4	28 – Moni	5 – Tied	5 – Moni	Scheels Center (1,378); Fargo, ND
Summit League regular season
January 2, 2025; 7:00 pm, WDAY Xtra/SLN		St. Thomas	L 85–89	11–5 (0–1)	25 – Moni	8 – Tied	4 – Tied	Scheels Center (1,492); Fargo, ND
January 4, 2025; 1:00 pm, WDAY Xtra/SLN		Omaha	L 80–85	11–6 (0–2)	23 – Moni	10 – T. Miller	3 – Moni	Scheels Center (1,629); Fargo, ND
January 9, 2025; 7:00 pm, SLN		at Oral Roberts	W 110–96	12–6 (1–2)	28 – Moni	4 – Tied	8 – Moni	Mabee Center (2,197); Tulsa, OK
January 11, 2025; 2:00 pm, SLN		at Denver	W 69–50	13–6 (2–2)	15 – Moni	9 – Feddersen	4 – Tied	Hamilton Gymnasium (954); Denver, CO
January 16, 2025; 7:00 pm, WDAY Xtra/SLN		Kansas City	W 71–64	14–6 (3–2)	24 – Moni	8 – Moni	3 – Stefonowicz	Scheels Center (1,544); Fargo, ND
January 18, 2025; 2:00 pm, SLN		at South Dakota	W 103–77	15–6 (4–2)	32 – White	11 – Feddersen	5 – Tied	Sanford Coyote Sports Center (2,001); Vermillion, SD
January 25, 2025; 4:00 pm, WDAY Xtra/SLN		North Dakota	W 87–82	16–6 (5–2)	24 – Moni	10 – Moni	4 – Moni	Scheels Center (5,198); Fargo, ND
January 30, 2025; 7:00 pm, WDAY Xtra/SLN		South Dakota State	L 62–72	16–7 (5–3)	19 – Moni	8 – Moni	2 – Feddersen	Scheels Center (2,791); Fargo, ND
February 2, 2025; 3:00 pm, CBS Sports Network		at St. Thomas	L 62–79	16–8 (5–4)	23 – White	8 – T. Miller	3 – T. Miller	Schoenecker Arena (2,068); St. Paul, MN
February 6, 2025; 7:00 pm, SLN		at Kansas City	W 78–72	17–8 (6–4)	24 – Moni	10 – Feddersen	8 – White	Swinney Recreation Center (986); Kansas City, MO
February 8, 2025; 1:00 pm, SLN		at Omaha	L 74–85	17–9 (6–5)	25 – White	8 – Feddersen	4 – White	Baxter Arena (2,288); Omaha, NE
February 13, 2025; 8:00 pm, CBSSN		Oral Roberts	W 94–88 ^{OT}	18–9 (7–5)	32 – Moni	9 – White	5 – Watkins	Scheels Center (1,103); Fargo, ND
February 15, 2025; 1:00 pm, WDAY Xtra/SLN		Denver	W 89–84 ^{OT}	19–9 (8–5)	27 – Moni	6 – Moni	7 – Moni	Scheels Center (1,993); Fargo, ND
February 19, 2025; 7:00 pm, SLN		at South Dakota State	W 77–68	20–9 (9–5)	28 – Moni	8 – Feddersen	4 – Moni	First Bank & Trust Arena (4,115); Brookings, SD
February 22, 2025; 1:00 pm, SLN		at North Dakota	L 77–79	20–10 (9–6)	26 – White	6 – Moni	4 – Moni	Betty Engelstad Sioux Center (2,517); Grand Forks, ND
February 26, 2025; 7:00 pm, WDAY Xtra/SLN		South Dakota	W 82–78	21–10 (10–6)	20 – White	13 – Dissette	3 – Stefonowicz	Scheels Center (1,710); Fargo, ND
Summit League tournament
March 7, 2025; 6:00 pm, SLN	(4)	vs. (5) South Dakota; Quarterfinals	L 84–85	21–11	26 – T. Miller	8 – T. Miller	6 – Stefonowicz	Denny Sanford Premier Center (9,202); Sioux Falls, SD
*Non-conference game. ^{#}Rankings from AP Poll. (#) Tournament seedings in parentheses. All times are in Central.

== Awards and accolades ==
=== Summit League Player of the Week ===
Week	Player(s) of the Week	School
Dec. 9	Jackson Moni	North Dakota State
Dec. 16	Jackson Moni (2)	North Dakota State (2)
Dec. 30	Jackson Moni (3)	North Dakota State (3)

=== Summit League End of Season Awards ===
- All–Summit League
  - First team
    - Jacksen Moni
  - Second team
    - Jacari White
  - Honorable mention
    - Masen Miller
- All-Newcomer Team
  - Jacksen Moni
- Sixth Man of the Year
  - Tajavis Miller
