= 2024–25 South Dakota Coyotes men's basketball team =

American college basketball season

2024–25 South Dakota Coyotes men's basketball
- Conference: Summit League
- Record: 19–14 (9–7 Summit)
- Head coach: Eric Peterson (3rd season)
- Assistant coaches: Casey Kasperbauer; Brandon Ubel; Dwight Smith; Sean Smith; Michael Russell Smith
- Home arena: Sanford Coyote Sports Center

2024–25 Summit League men's basketball standings
	Conf.				Overall
Team	W		L	PCT	W		L	PCT
Omaha †	13	–	3	.813	22	–	13	.629
St. Thomas *	12	–	4	.750	24	–	10	.706
South Dakota State	11	–	5	.688	20	–	12	.625
North Dakota State	10	–	6	.625	21	–	11	.656
South Dakota	9	–	7	.563	19	–	14	.576
North Dakota	5	–	11	.313	12	–	21	.364
Denver	5	–	11	.313	11	–	21	.344
Kansas City	4	–	12	.250	13	–	20	.394
Oral Roberts	3	–	13	.188	7	–	23	.233
† 2025 Summit League tournament winner * Ineligible for the 2025 NCAA tournament due to transition from Division III

The 2024–25 South Dakota Coyotes men's basketball team represented the University of South Dakota in the 2024–25 NCAA Division I men's basketball season. The Coyotes were led by third-year head coach Eric Peterson and played their home games at the Sanford Coyote Sports Center in Vermillion, South Dakota as members of the Summit League.

The Coyotes finished the season with a 19–14 record, 9–7 in Summit League play, to finish in fifth place. They defeated North Dakota State in the quarterfinals of the Summit League tournament before falling to Omaha in the semifinals.

== Previous season ==
The Coyotes finished the 2023–24 season 12–20, 5–11 in Summit League play, to finish in ninth place. They lost to Oral Roberts in the first round of the Summit League tournament.

== Roster ==
2024–25 South Dakota Coyotes men's basketball team
Players
Coaches

Pos.	#	Name	Height	Weight	Year	Hometown
F	0	Mayuom Buom	6 ft 10 in (2.08 m)	—	Sr	Lincoln, NE
G	1	Kaleb Stewart	6 ft 3 in (1.91 m)	—	Sr	Houston, TX
G	2	Shey Eberwein	6 ft 5 in (1.96 m)	—	RS Fr	The Woodlands, TX
G	3	Max Burchill	6 ft 4 in (1.93 m)	200 lb (91 kg)	Sr	Sioux Falls, SD
G	5	Porter Ihnen	6 ft 6 in (1.98 m)	—	Fr	Lennox, SD
G	9	Chase Forte	6 ft 4 in (1.93 m)	—	Sr	Raleigh, NC
G	10	Evan Anderson	6 ft 4 in (1.93 m)	—	Fr	Onalaska, WI
G	11	Dre Bullock	6 ft 6 in (1.98 m)	—	Sr	Franklinton, NC
G	12	Isaac Bruns	6 ft 4 in (1.93 m)	—	So	North Sioux City, SD
F	15	Jevon Hill	6 ft 9 in (2.06 m)	—	RS So	Wichita, KS
F	21	Jake Brack	6 ft 9 in (2.06 m)	—	So	Omaha, NE
F	22	Oliver Kokal	6 ft 7 in (2.01 m)	—	Fr	Chesterfield, MO
G	23	Paul Bruns	6 ft 4 in (1.93 m)	—	Sr	North Sioux City, SD
G	25	Jalen Hayes	6 ft 2 in (1.88 m)	—	RS Fr	Richfield, MN
F	32	Ashton Smith	6 ft 9 in (2.06 m)	—	Jr	Spring, TX
C	54	Cameron Fens	7 ft 0 in (2.13 m)	—	Jr	Dubuque, IA

Head coach

- Eric Peterson (UW–La Crosse)

Assistant coach(es)

- Casey Kasperbauer (South Dakota)
- Brandon Ubel (Nebraska)
- Dwight Smith (Northern Colorado)
- Sean Smith (Trinity International)
- Michael Russell (Black Hills State)

Legend

- (C) Team captain
- (S) Suspended
- (I) Ineligible
- (W) Walk-on
- Injured
- Current redshirt

Roster
Last update: October 15, 2024

== Schedule and results ==
Date time, TV	Rank^{#}	Opponent^{#}	Result	Record	Site (attendance) city, state
Non-conference regular season
November 4, 2024*; 8:00 p.m., Summit League Network		Southern	W 93–79	1–0	Sanford Coyote Sports Center (2,013); Vermillion, SD
November 6, 2024*; 7:00 p.m., SLN		East Texas A&M	W 91–83	2–0	Sanford Coyote Sports Center (1,493); Vermillion, SD
November 10, 2024*; 2:00 p.m., SLN		Mount Marty	W 77–47	3–0	Sanford Coyote Sports Center (1,607); Vermillion, SD
November 12, 2024*; 8:00 p.m., BTN		at Iowa	L 77–96	3–1	Carver–Hawkeye Arena (7,628); Iowa City, IA
November 14, 2024*; 6:00 p.m., SLN		Dakota Wesleyan	W 92–69	4–1	Sanford Coyote Sports Center (1,610); Vermillion, SD
November 20, 2024*; 6:00 p.m., ESPN+		at Western Michigan	W 80–76	5–1	University Arena (1,203); Kalamazoo, MI
November 22, 2024*; 7:00 p.m., ESPN+		at Southern Indiana	L 83–92	5–2	Screaming Eagles Arena (1,544); Evansville, IN
November 25, 2024*; 7:00 p.m., SLN		Randall (OK)	W 112–50	6–2	Sanford Coyote Sports Center (1,290); Vermillion, SD
November 27, 2024*; 5:30 p.m., BTN		at Nebraska	L 79–96	6–3	Pinnacle Bank Arena; Lincoln, NE
December 4, 2024*; 7:00 p.m., SLN		Idaho State; Big Sky–Summit Challenge	W 94–80	7–3	Sanford Coyote Sports Centeer (1,589); Vermillion, SD
December 7, 2024*; 2:00 p.m., ESPN+		at Northern Arizona; Big Sky–Summit Challenge	L 82–95	7–4	Walkup Skydome (444); Flagstaff, AZ
December 10, 2024*; 7:00 p.m., SLN		Wyoming	W 82–81	8–4	Sanford Coyote Sports Center (1,838); Vermillion, SD
December 14, 2024*; 2:00 p.m., SLN		Western Illinois	W 89–66	9–4	Sanford Coyote Sports Center (1,550); Vermillion, SD
December 19, 2024*; 8:00 p.m., ESPN+		at Utah Tech	L 87–92	9–5	Burns Arena (1,016); St. George, UT
December 21, 2024*; 4:00 p.m., ESPN+		at Santa Clara	L 81–98	9–6	Leavey Center (1,120); Santa Clara, CA
Summit League regular season
January 2, 2025; 7:00 p.m., SLN		at Kansas City	L 54–68	9–7 (0–1)	Swinney Recreation Center (872); Kansas City, MO
January 4, 2025; 7:00 p.m., SLN		Denver	W 91–84	10–7 (1–1)	Sanford Coyote Sports Center (1,508); Vermillion, SD
January 11, 2025; 7:00 p.m., SLN		at St. Thomas	L 104–119	10–8 (1–2)	Shoenecker Arena (1,583); St. Paul, MN
January 16, 2025; 7:00 p.m., SLN		Oral Roberts	W 92–82	11–8 (2–2)	Sanford Coyote Sports Center (2,119); Vermillion, SD
January 18, 2025; 2:00 p.m., SLN		North Dakota State	L 77–103	11–9 (2–3)	Sanford Coyote Sports Center (2,001); Vermillion, SD
January 23, 2025; 7:00 p.m., SLN		at North Dakota	W 102–93	12–9 (3–3)	Betty Engelstad Sioux Center (1,907); Grand Forks, ND
January 25, 2025; 5:00 p.m., SLN		at South Dakota State	L 71–90	12–10 (3–4)	First Bank & Trust Arena (4,764); Brookings, SD
January 29, 2025; 7:00 p.m., SLN		Omaha	W 91–87	13–10 (4–4)	Sanford Coyote Sports Center (1,676); Vermillion, SD
February 6, 2025; 8:00 p.m., SLN		at Denver	W 86–79	14–10 (5–4)	Hamilton Gymnasium (794); Denver, CO
February 8, 2025; 7:00 p.m., SLN		at Oral Roberts	W 75–74	15–10 (6–4)	Mabee Center (3,009); Tulsa, OK
February 13, 2025; 7:00 p.m., SLN		Kansas City	W 79–72	16–10 (7–4)	Sanford Coyote Sports Center (1,829); Vermillion, SD
February 16, 2025; 5:00 p.m., SLN		South Dakota State	L 91–94	16–11 (7–5)	Sanford Coyote Sports Center (3,942); Vermillion, SD
February 19, 2025; 7:00 p.m., SLN		St. Thomas	W 85–80	17–11 (8–5)	Sanford Coyote Sports Center (1,814); Vermillion, SD
February 22, 2025; 7:00 p.m., SLN		at Omaha	L 85–93	17–12 (8–6)	Baxter Arena (4,283); Omaha, NE
February 26, 2025; 7:00 p.m., SLN		at North Dakota State	L 78–82	17–13 (8–7)	Scheels Center (1,710); Fargo, ND
March 1, 2025; 4:00 p.m., SLN		North Dakota	W 92–79	18–13 (9–7)	Sanford Coyote Sports Center (2,659); Vermillion, SD
Summit League tournament
March 7, 2025; 6:00 p.m., SLN	(5)	vs. (4) North Dakota State; Quarterfinal	W 85–84	19–13	Denny Sanford Premier Center (9,202); Sioux Falls, SD
March 8, 2025; 7:00 p.m., CBS Sports Network	(5)	vs. (1) Omaha; Semifinal	L 75–100	19–14	Denny Sanford Premier Center (8,345); Sioux Falls, SD
*Non-conference game. ^{#}Rankings from AP poll. (#) Tournament seedings in parentheses. All times are in Central.
