= 2024–25 Santa Clara Broncos men's basketball team =

American college basketball season

2024–25 Santa Clara Broncos men's basketball

NIT, Second Round
- Conference: West Coast Conference
- Record: 21–13 (12–6 WCC)
- Head coach: Herb Sendek (9th season)
- Assistant coaches: Jason Ludwig; Scott Garson; Ryan Madry
- Home arena: Leavey Center

2024–25 West Coast Conference men's basketball standings
	Conf.				Overall
Team	W		L	PCT	W		L	PCT
No. 24 Saint Mary's	17	–	1	.944	29	–	6	.829
No. 23 Gonzaga †	14	–	4	.778	26	–	9	.743
San Francisco	13	–	5	.722	25	–	10	.714
Santa Clara	12	–	6	.667	21	–	13	.618
Oregon State	10	–	8	.556	20	–	13	.606
Washington State	8	–	10	.444	19	–	15	.559
Loyola Marymount	8	–	10	.444	17	–	15	.531
Portland	7	–	11	.389	12	–	20	.375
Pepperdine	4	–	14	.222	13	–	22	.371
Pacific	4	–	14	.222	9	–	24	.273
San Diego	2	–	16	.111	6	–	27	.182
† 2025 WCC tournament winner Rankings from AP poll

The 2024–25 Santa Clara Broncos men's basketball team represented Santa Clara University during the 2024–25 NCAA Division I men's basketball season. The Broncos, led by ninth-year head coach Herb Sendek, played their home games at the Leavey Center as members of the West Coast Conference. The Broncos finished the season 21–13, 12–6 in WCC play to finish in fourth place. They were upset in the quarterfinals of the WCC tournament by Pepperdine. They received an at-large bid to the National Invitation Tournament as a No. 2 seed. There they defeated UC Riverside before losing to UAB in the second round.

== Previous season ==
The Broncos finished the 2023–24 season 20–13, 10–6 in WCC play to finish in fourth place. In the WCC tournament, they defeated San Diego before losing to Saint Mary's in the quarterfinals.

== Offseason ==
=== Departures ===
Name	Number	Pos.	Height	Weight	Year	Hometown	Reason for departure
Francisco Cáffaro	10	C	7'1"	242	GS Senior	Santa Fe, Argentina	Graduated
Jalen Benjamin	15	G	5'10"	160	Senior	Raleigh, NC	Graduated
Carlos Marshall Jr.	22	G	6'6"	205	(redshirt) Senior	Memphis, TN	Walk-on; graduated

=== Incoming transfers ===
Name	Number	Pos.	Height	Weight	Year	Hometown	Previous School
Elijah Mahi	8	F	6'6"	220	Junior	Toronto, ON	West Valley College
Carlos Stewart	10	G	6'1"	193	Senior	Baton Rouge, LA	LSU

=== Recruiting classes ===
==== 2024 recruiting class ====
College recruiting
Name	Hometown	School	Height	Weight	Commit date
Allen Graves; PF	Ponchatoula, LA	Ponchatoula High School	6 ft 8 in (2.03 m)	N/A	Jun 27, 2023
Allen Graves; PF	Recruit ratings: Scout: Rivals: 247Sports: (0)				
Overall recruit ranking: Scout: nr Rivals: nr ESPN: nr
Note: In many cases, Scout, Rivals, 247Sports, On3, and ESPN may conflict in their listings of height and weight.; In these cases, the average was taken. ESPN grades are on a 100-point scale.; Sources: "Santa Clara 2024 Basketball Commitments". Rivals.; "2024 Santa Clara Basketball Commits". Scout.; "ESPN". ESPN.; "Scout.com Team Recruiting Rankings". Scout.; "2024 Team Ranking". Rivals.

==== 2025 recruiting class ====
College recruiting (2025)
Name	Hometown	School	Height	Weight	Commit date
Bradley Longcor; PG	Quincy, IL	Quincy High School	6 ft 3 in (1.91 m)	170 lb (77 kg)	Jun 20, 2024
Bradley Longcor; PG	Recruit ratings: Scout: Rivals: 247Sports: (0)				
Overall recruit ranking: Scout: nr Rivals: nr ESPN: nr
Note: In many cases, Scout, Rivals, 247Sports, On3, and ESPN may conflict in their listings of height and weight.; In these cases, the average was taken. ESPN grades are on a 100-point scale.; Sources: "Santa Clara 2025 Basketball Commitments". Rivals.; "2025 Santa Clara Basketball Commits". Scout.; "ESPN". ESPN.; "Scout.com Team Recruiting Rankings". Scout.; "2025 Team Ranking". Rivals.

== Roster ==
2024–25 Santa Clara Broncos men's basketball team
Players
Coaches

Pos.	#	Name	Height	Weight	Year	Previous school	Hometown
G	0	Brenton Knapper	6 ft 0 in (1.83 m)	170 lb (77 kg)	RS Jr	Colony HS	Ontario, CA
G	1	Tyeree Bryan	6 ft 6 in (1.98 m)	205 lb (93 kg)	Sr	Olympia HS; Charleston Southern	Orlando, FL
G	2	Christian Hammond	6 ft 4 in (1.93 m)	195 lb (88 kg)	So	Dream City Christian (AZ)	Denver, CO
G	3	Kosy Akametu	6 ft 5 in (1.96 m)	210 lb (95 kg)	RS So	King Drew HS	Carson, CA
G	4	Adama Bal	6 ft 7 in (2.01 m)	190 lb (86 kg)	Sr	INSEP Paris; Arizona	Le Mans, France
F	8	Elijah Mahi	6 ft 7 in (2.01 m)	220 lb (100 kg)	Jr	Potter's House Christian (FL); West Valley College	Toroto, ON
G	10	Carlos Stewart	6 ft 1 in (1.85 m)	185 lb (84 kg)	Sr	The Dunham School; LSU	Baton Rouge, LA
C	12	Bukky Oboye	7 ft 1 in (2.16 m)	200 lb (91 kg)	RS Fr	Clements HS	Sugarland, TX
C	13	Christoph Tilly	7 ft 0 in (2.13 m)	225 lb (102 kg)	Jr	Alba Berlin	Berlin, Germany
F	14	Johnny O'Neil	6 ft 10 in (2.08 m)	205 lb (93 kg)	Sr	Chaminade-Madonna Prep; American	Miami Shores, FL
F	20	Luke McEldon	6 ft 10 in (2.08 m)	240 lb (109 kg)	So	Cushing Academy	London, England
F	21	Camaron Tongue	6 ft 7 in (2.01 m)	220 lb (100 kg)	Sr	Rivers School	Medfield, MA
F	22	Allen Graves (redshirt)	6 ft 9 in (2.06 m)	220 lb (100 kg)	Fr	Ponchatoula HS	Ponchatoula, LA
G	44	Jake Ensminger	6 ft 9 in (2.06 m)	205 lb (93 kg)	RS So	Ratiopharm Ulm	Ulm, Germany
G	50	Bradan Yarusso (W)	6 ft 1 in (1.85 m)	160 lb (73 kg)	Jr	St. Francis HS	Lombard, IL
G	54	Malachi Douyon (W)	6 ft 3 in (1.91 m)	180 lb (82 kg)	Jr	Pacific Collegiate Charter School	Santa Cruz, CA

Head coach

- Herb Sendek (Carnegie Mellon)

Assistant coach(es)

- Jason Ludwig (UCLA)
- Scott Garson (UC Santa Barbara)
- Ryan Madry (West Georgia)

Legend

- (C) Team captain
- (S) Suspended
- (I) Ineligible
- (W) Walk-on
- Injured
- Current redshirt

Roster

== Schedule and results ==
Date time, TV	Rank^{#}	Opponent^{#}	Result	Record	High points	High rebounds	High assists	Site (attendance) city, state
Non-conference regular season
November 4, 2024*; 12:00 p.m., YouTube		vs. Saint Louis; Field of 68 Opening Day Showcase	W 85–78	1−0	24 – Bal	8 – Tilly	5 – Stewart Jr.	Sanford Pentagon (2,300); Sioux Falls, SD
November 8, 2024*; 5:00 p.m., FloSports		vs. Arizona State; Las Vegas Hoopfest	L 74–81	1–1	19 – Mahi	8 – Ensminger	4 – Tied	Lee's Family Forum; Henderson, NV
November 13, 2024*; 7:00 p.m., ESPN+		North Dakota State	L 80–88 ^{OT}	1–2	18 – Bal	14 – O'Neil	3 – Bal	Leavey Center (1,628); Santa Clara, CA
November 16, 2024*; 7:00 p.m., MW Network		at Nevada	L 59–85	1–3	22 – Mahi	6 – O'Neil	2 – Stewart Jr.	Lawlor Events Center (8,772); Reno, NV
November 19, 2024*; 7:00 p.m., ESPN+		UC Riverside; Acrisure Invitational campus site game	W 96–54	2–3	20 – Tilly	7 – O'Neil	5 – Tilly	Leavey Center (1,230); Santa Clara, CA
November 23, 2024*; 7:00 p.m., ESPN+		Stanford	L 69–71	2–4	16 – Tilly	5 – Tied	4 – Knapper	Leavey Center (2,100); Santa Clara, CA
November 28, 2024*; 1:00 p.m., TruTV		vs. TCU; Acrisure Invitational semifinals	W 69–52	3–4	18 – Stewart Jr.	11 – Ensminger	5 – Ensminger	Acrisure Arena (320); Thousand Palms, CA
November 29, 2024*; 1:30 p.m., TruTV		vs. Washington; Acrisure Invitational championship	L 69–76	3–5	20 – Stewart Jr.	7 – Mahi	3 – Mahi	Acrisure Arena (1,532); Thousand Palms, CA
December 3, 2024*; 4:00 p.m., ESPN+		at McNeese	W 74–67	4–5	17 – Bryan	10 – Mahi	4 – Bal	The Legacy Center (3,102); Lake Charles, LA
December 7, 2024*; 4:00 p.m., ESPN+		Fresno State	W 81–66	5–5	18 – Stewart Jr.	11 – Ensminger	5 – Ensminger	Leavey Center (1,513); Santa Clara, CA
December 14, 2024*; 1:30 p.m., Baller TV		vs. Bradley; Jack Jones Classic	W 84–74	6–5	23 – Mahi	9 – Ensminger	5 – Tilly	Lee's Family Forum; Henderson, NV
December 18, 2024*; 7:00 p.m., ESPN+		Kennesaw State	W 94–74	7–5	27 – Bal	10 – Ensminger	4 – Tied	Leavey Center (1,047); Santa Clara, CA
December 21, 2024*; 2:00 p.m., ESPN+		South Dakota	W 98–81	8–5	20 – Bal	10 – Ensminger	6 – O'Neil	Leavey Center (1,120); Santa Clara, CA
WCC regular season
December 28, 2024; 4:00 p.m., ESPN+		Pepperdine	W 91–80	9–5 (1–0)	19 – Bal	5 – Tied	8 – Bal	Leavey Center (1,133); Santa Clara, CA
December 30, 2024; 7:00 p.m., ESPN+		at San Francisco	L 94–97 ^{OT}	9–6 (1–1)	20 – Tied	10 – O'Neil	6 – Stewart	Sobrato Center (2,958); San Francisco, CA
January 2, 2025; 7:00 p.m., ESPN+		at San Diego	W 81–80	10–6 (2–1)	20 – Stewart Jr.	10 – O'Neil	4 – Bal	Jenny Craig Pavilion (782); San Diego, CA
January 9, 2025; 7:00 p.m., ESPN+		Oregon State	W 82–81 ^{OT}	11–6 (3–1)	21 – Mahi	7 – Tied	5 – Mahi	Leavey Center (1,675); Santa Clara, CA
January 11, 2025; 4:00 p.m., ESPN+		San Francisco	W 77–54	12–6 (4–1)	25 – Stewart Jr.	7 – Tilly	4 – Stewart Jr.	Leavey Center (2,500); Santa Clara, CA
January 16, 2025; 7:00 p.m., ESPN+		at Loyola Marymount	L 54–57	12–7 (4–2)	25 – Tilly	10 – Ensminger	5 – Bal	Gersten Pavilion (1,499); Los Angeles, CA
January 18, 2025; 6:00 p.m., ESPN+		at No. 16 Gonzaga	W 103–99	13–7 (5–2)	35 – Bryan	9 – Ensminger	4 – Tied	McCarthey Athletic Center (6,000); Spokane, WA
January 23, 2025; 8:00 p.m., CBSSN		Washington State	W 93–65	14–7 (6–2)	17 – O'Neil	10 – Tilly	4 – Tied	Leavey Center (1,875); Santa Clara, CA
January 25, 2025; 2:00 p.m., ESPN+		at Oregon State	L 69–83	14–8 (6–3)	13 – Bal	6 – O'Neil	7 – Knapper	Gill Coliseum (4,725); Corvallis, OR
January 29, 2025; 6:00 p.m., ESPNU		Saint Mary's	L 54–67	14–9 (6–4)	24 – Stewart Jr.	6 – Ensminger	3 – Stewart Jr.	Leavey Center (3,208); Santa Clara, CA
February 1, 2025; 4:00 p.m., ESPN+		Pacific	W 83–49	15–9 (7–4)	19 – Tilly	6 – Tilly	6 – Mahi	Leavey Center (1,889); Santa Clara, CA
February 6, 2025; 7:00 p.m., ESPN+		at Portland	W 97–50	16–9 (8–4)	19 – Tongue	10 – Tied	5 – Tied	Chiles Center (1,044); Portland, OR
February 8, 2025; 4:00 p.m., ESPN+		San Diego	W 93–70	17–9 (9–4)	28 – Mahi	7 – O'Neil	7 – Mahi	Leavey Center (2,227); Santa Clara, CA
February 11, 2025; 8:00 p.m., ESPN2		at Saint Mary's	L 64–73	17–10 (9–5)	18 – O'Neil	6 – O'Neil	6 – Stewart	University Credit Union Pavilion (3,500); Moraga, CA
February 19, 2025; 8:00 p.m., ESPN2		Loyola Marymount	W 76–61	18–10 (10–5)	16 – Stewart	13 – Ensminger	3 – Mahi	Leavey Center (2,129); Santa Clara, CA
February 22, 2025; 3:00 p.m., CBSSN		at Washington State	W 109–79	19–10 (11–5)	22 – Stewart Jr.	8 – Tongue	5 – Knapper	Beasley Coliseum (4,380); Pullman, WA
February 25, 2025; 8:00 p.m., CBSSN		Gonzaga	L 76–95	19–11 (11–6)	18 – Bryan	7 – O'Neil	4 – Bal	Leavey Center (4,200); Santa Clara, CA
March 1, 2025; 5:00 p.m., ESPN+		at Pacific	W 97–66	20–11 (12–6)	21 – Tilly	12 – Tilly	5 – Mahi	Alex G. Spanos Center (1,554); Stockton, CA
WCC tournament
March 9, 2025; 5:30 p.m., ESPN2	(4)	vs. (9) Pepperdine; Quarterfinals	L 76–78	20–12	18 – Bryan	9 – O'Neil	3 – Tied	Orleans Arena (2,523); Paradise, NV
NIT
March 18, 2025*; 8:00 p.m., ESPNU	(2)	UC Riverside; First Round – Irvine Region	W 101–62	21–12	17 – Bryan	7 – Bryan	5 – Mahi	Leavey Center (672); Santa Clara, CA
March 23, 2025*; 6:00 p.m., ESPNU	(2)	UAB; Second Round – Irvine Region	L 84–88	21–13	19 – Stewart Jr.	12 – Tilly	7 – Mahi	Leavey Center (742); Santa Clara, CA
*Non-conference game. ^{#}Rankings from AP Poll. (#) Tournament seedings in parentheses. All times are in Pacific Time.
