= 2024–25 South Dakota State Jackrabbits men's basketball team =

American college basketball season

2024–25 South Dakota State Jackrabbits men's basketball
- Conference: Summit League
- Record: 20–12 (11–5 Summit)
- Head coach: Eric Henderson (6th season)
- Associate head coach: Rob Klinkefus
- Assistant coaches: Bryan Petersen; Tramel Barnes; Billy Brown
- Home arena: First Bank & Trust Arena

2024–25 Summit League men's basketball standings
	Conf.				Overall
Team	W		L	PCT	W		L	PCT
Omaha †	13	–	3	.813	22	–	13	.629
St. Thomas *	12	–	4	.750	24	–	10	.706
South Dakota State	11	–	5	.688	20	–	12	.625
North Dakota State	10	–	6	.625	21	–	11	.656
South Dakota	9	–	7	.563	19	–	14	.576
North Dakota	5	–	11	.313	12	–	21	.364
Denver	5	–	11	.313	11	–	21	.344
Kansas City	4	–	12	.250	13	–	20	.394
Oral Roberts	3	–	13	.188	7	–	23	.233
† 2025 Summit League tournament winner * Ineligible for the 2025 NCAA tournament due to transition from Division III

The 2024–25 South Dakota State Jackrabbits men's basketball team represented South Dakota State University in the 2024–25 NCAA Division I men's basketball season. The Jackrabbits, led by sixth-year head coach Eric Henderson, played their home games at First Bank & Trust Arena in Brookings, South Dakota, as members of the Summit League. They finished the season 20–12, 11–5 in Summit League play to finish in third place. They lost to North Dakota in the quarterfinals of the Summit League tournament.

On March 28, 2025, head coach Eric Henderson left the team to take the head coaching position at Drake. A day later, the school named assistant coach Bryan Petersen the team's new head coach.

== Previous season ==
The Jackrabbits finished the 2023–24 season 22–13, 12–4 in Summit League play to win their ninth regular season title. SDSU defeated Oral Roberts, St. Thomas, and Denver en route to their seventh Summit League tournament championship. As a result, they received the conference's automatic bid to the NCAA tournament as the No. 15 seed out of the East region. They lost to Iowa State in the first round.

== Roster ==
2024–25 South Dakota State Jackrabbits men's basketball team
Players
Coaches

Pos.	#	Name	Height	Weight	Year	Previous school	Hometown
F	0	William Whorton	6 ft 8 in (2.03 m)	220 lb (100 kg)	RS Fr	Rufus King High School	Milwaukee, WI
G	1	Owen Larson	6 ft 2 in (1.88 m)	195 lb (88 kg)	Fr	Estherville Lincoln Central High School	Estherville, IA
G	2	Isaac Lindsey	6 ft 4 in (1.93 m)	190 lb (86 kg)	Sr	Wisconsin	Mineral Point, WI
G	3	Joe Sayler	6 ft 3 in (1.91 m)	200 lb (91 kg)	RS Fr	White River High School	White River, SD
F	4	Stoney Hadnot	6 ft 6 in (1.98 m)	200 lb (91 kg)	Fr	Cypress Springs High School	Houston, TX
F	5	Nate Barnhart	7 ft 0 in (2.13 m)	205 lb (93 kg)	Jr	Wyoming	Lenexa, KS
G	10	Kalen Garry	6 ft 3 in (1.91 m)	200 lb (91 kg)	So	De Smet High School	De Smet, SD
F	11	Matthew Mors	6 ft 7 in (2.01 m)	215 lb (98 kg)	Jr	Wisconsin	Yankton, SD
G	12	Bubz Alvarez	6 ft 5 in (1.96 m)	200 lb (91 kg)	So	Houston Heights High School	Houston, TX
G	14	Jaden Jackson	6 ft 0 in (1.83 m)	185 lb (84 kg)	Fr	Bellevue West High School	Bellevue, NE
G	23	Andrell Burton Jr.	6 ft 6 in (1.98 m)	195 lb (88 kg)	Fr	Campus High School	Wichita, KS
G	33	Jadyn Cascio Jensen	6 ft 3 in (1.91 m)	180 lb (82 kg)	Fr	Bellevue West High School	Fremont, NE
C	34	Damon Wilkinson	6 ft 10 in (2.08 m)	245 lb (111 kg)	RS Fr	De Smet High School	De Smet, SD
C	35	Alec Squires	6 ft 10 in (2.08 m)	245 lb (111 kg)	Fr	Sioux Valley High School	Volga, SD
C	45	Oscar Cluff	6 ft 11 in (2.11 m)	260 lb (118 kg)	Sr	Washington State	Sunshine Coast, AUS

Head coach

- Eric Henderson (Wayne State (NE))

Assistant coach(es)

- Rob Klinkefus (Buena Vista)
- Bryan Petersen (Iowa State)
- Tramel Barnes (Southwest Minnesota State)
- Billy Brown (South Dakota State)

Legend

- (C) Team captain
- (S) Suspended
- (I) Ineligible
- (W) Walk-on
- Injured
- Current redshirt

Roster
Last update: October 17, 2024

== Schedule and results ==
Date time, TV	Rank^{#}	Opponent^{#}	Result	Record	Site (attendance) city, state
Exhibition
October 30, 2024*; 8:15 pm		Black Hills State	W 90–77	–	First Bank & Trust Arena (2,721); Brookings, SD
Non-conference regular season
November 4, 2024*; 5:00 pm, YouTube		vs. McNeese; Field of 68 Opening Day Showcase	W 80–73	1–0	Sanford Pentagon (2,878); Sioux Falls, SD
November 8, 2024*; 8:15 pm, MidcoSN/Summit League Network		Long Beach State	W 80–79	2–0	First Bank & Trust Arena (3,646); Brookings, SD
November 14, 2024*; 8:00 pm, SLN		vs. Northern Colorado	L 69–78	2–1	The Monument (4,887); Rapid City, SD
November 18, 2024*; 7:00 pm, SLN		Mount Marty	W 89–41	3–1	First Bank & Trust Arena (1,765); Brookings, SD
November 20, 2024*; 7:00 pm, MidcoSN/SLN		Southern Miss	W 101–76	4–1	First Bank & Trust Arena (2,429); Brookings, SD
November 24, 2024*; 12:30 pm, FloSports		vs. Duquesne; Cayman Islands Classic Quarterfinal	W 71–60	5–1	John Gray Gymnasium; George Town, Cayman Islands
November 25, 2024*; 12:30 p.m., FloSports		vs. Boise State; Cayman Islands Classic Semifinal	L 82–83	5–2	John Gray Gymnasium (910); George Town, Cayman Islands
November 26, 2024*; 4:00 p.m., FloSports		vs. Missouri State; Cayman Islands Classic Third Place	W 75–55	6–2	John Gray Gymnasium (920); George Town, Cayman Islands
December 2, 2024*; 7:00 pm, SLN		Dakota Wesleyan	W 78–62	7–2	First Bank & Trust Arena (1,849); Brookings, SD
December 4, 2024*; 8:00 pm, ESPN+		at Montana; Big Sky–Summit Challenge	L 67–71	7–3	Dahlberg Arena (2,534); Missoula, MT
December 7, 2024*; 6:00 pm, SLN		Eastern Washington; Big Sky–Summit Challenge	W 74–53	8–3	First Bank & Trust Arena (2,768); Brookings, SD
December 11, 2024*; 9:00 pm, MW Network		at Nevada	L 63–77	8–4	Lawlor Events Center (7,440); Reno, NV
December 13, 2024*; 8:00 pm, ESPN+		at Colorado	L 70–81	8–5	CU Events Center (5,942); Boulder, CO
December 19, 2024*; 7:00 pm, SLN		Chadron State	W 87–72	9–5	First Bank & Trust Arena (1,258); Brookings, SD
December 29, 2024*; 2:00 pm, SECN+/ESPN+		at No. 5 Alabama	L 82–105	9–6	Coleman Coliseum (13,474); Tuscaloosa, AL
Summit League regular season
January 2, 2025; 8:00 pm, CBS Sports Network		Denver	W 91–70	10–6 (1–0)	First Bank & Trust Arena (1,925); Brookings, SD
January 8, 2025; 8:00 pm, SLN		at St. Thomas	L 72–73	10–7 (1–1)	Shoenecker Arena (1,852); St. Paul, MN
January 11, 2025; 1:00 pm, SLN		at Omaha	L 80–87	10–8 (1–2)	Baxter Arena (2,849); Omaha, NE
January 16, 2025; 7:00 pm, MidcoSN/SLN		North Dakota	W 109–73	11–8 (2–2)	First Bank & Trust Arena (3,261); Brookings, SD
January 18, 2025; 4:15 pm, MidcoSN2/SLN		Oral Roberts	W 84–70	12–8 (3–2)	First Bank & Trust Arena (3,681); Brookings, SD
January 23, 2025; 7:00 pm, SLN		at Kansas City	W 65–64	13–8 (4–2)	Swinney Recreation Center (1,116); Kansas City, MO
January 25, 2025; 5:00 pm, MidcoSN/SLN		South Dakota	W 90–71	14–8 (5–2)	First Bank & Trust Arena (4,764); Brookings, SD
January 30, 2025; 7:00 pm, SLN		at North Dakota State	W 72–62	15–8 (6–2)	Scheels Center (2,791); Fargo, ND
February 1, 2025; 1:00 pm, MidcoSN/SLN		at North Dakota	L 75–80	15–9 (6–3)	Betty Engelstad Sioux Center (2,025); Grand Forks, ND
February 6, 2025; 7:00 pm, MidcoSN/SLN		St. Thomas	W 102–86	16–9 (7–3)	First Bank & Trust Arena (3,144); Brookings, SD
February 13, 2025; 7:00 pm, SLN		Omaha	W 98–85	17–9 (8–3)	First Bank & Trust Arena (3,842); Brookings, SD
February 16, 2025; 1:00 pm, CBSSN		at South Dakota	W 94–91	18–9 (9–3)	Sanford Coyote Sports Center (3,942); Vermillion, SD
February 19, 2025; 7:00 pm, MidcoSN/SLN		North Dakota State	L 68–77	18–10 (9–4)	First Bank & Trust Arena (4,115); Brookings, SD
February 23, 2025; 1:00 pm, CBSSN		Kansas City	W 70–65	19–10 (10–4)	First Bank & Trust Arena (3,425); Brookings, SD
February 27, 2025; 7:00 pm, SLN		at Oral Roberts	W 77–69	20–10 (11–4)	Mabee Center (3,281); Tulsa, OK
March 1, 2025; 2:00 pm, SLN		at Denver	L 62–78	20–11 (11–5)	Hamilton Gymnasium (1,165); Denver, CO
Summit League Tournament
March 7, 2025; 8:15 pm, MidcoSN/SLN	(3)	vs. (6) North Dakota; Quarterfinals	L 69–85	20–12	Denny Sanford Premier Center (9,202); Sioux Falls, SD
*Non-conference game. ^{#}Rankings from AP Poll. (#) Tournament seedings in parentheses. All times are in Central.

== Rankings ==
Ranking movements Legend: ██ Increase in ranking ██ Decrease in ranking — = Not ranked RV = Received votes
	Week																				
Poll	Pre	1	2	3	4	5	6	7	8	9	10	11	12	13	14	15	16	17	18	19	Final
AP	—	RV	—	—	—	—															
Coaches	—	—	—	—	—	—															
