= 2024–25 Denver Pioneers men's basketball team =

American college basketball season

2024–25 Denver Pioneers men's basketball
- Conference: Summit League
- Record: 11–21 (5–11 Summit)
- Head coach: Jeff Wulbrun (4th season)
- Assistant coaches: Bill Peterson; Curran Walsh; Shammond Williams
- Home arena: Hamilton Gymnasium

2024–25 Summit League men's basketball standings
	Conf.				Overall
Team	W		L	PCT	W		L	PCT
Omaha †	13	–	3	.813	22	–	13	.629
St. Thomas *	12	–	4	.750	24	–	10	.706
South Dakota State	11	–	5	.688	20	–	12	.625
North Dakota State	10	–	6	.625	21	–	11	.656
South Dakota	9	–	7	.563	19	–	14	.576
North Dakota	5	–	11	.313	12	–	21	.364
Denver	5	–	11	.313	11	–	21	.344
Kansas City	4	–	12	.250	13	–	20	.394
Oral Roberts	3	–	13	.188	7	–	23	.233
† 2025 Summit League tournament winner * Ineligible for the 2025 NCAA tournament due to transition from Division III

The 2024–25 Denver Pioneers men's basketball team represented the University of Denver in the 2024–25 NCAA Division I men's basketball season. The Pioneers, led by fourth-year head coach Jeff Wulbrun, played home games at Hamilton Gymnasium in Denver, Colorado as members of the Summit League.

== Previous season ==
The Pioneers finished the 2023–24 17–17, 6–10 in Summit League play, to finish in seventh place. In the Summit League tournament, Denver defeated Kansas City in the quarterfinals and Omaha in the semifinals, before losing to South Dakota State in their first-ever Summit League championship game appearance.

== Roster ==
2024–25 Denver Pioneers men's basketball team
Players
Coaches

Pos.	#	Name	Height	Weight	Year	Hometown
G	0	Sebastian Akins	6 ft 2 in (1.88 m)	175 lb (79 kg)	Fr	Concord, NC
G	1	Nicholas Shogbonyo	6 ft 1 in (1.85 m)	180 lb (82 kg)	Jr	Arlington, TX
G	2	Devin Carney	6 ft 1 in (1.85 m)	185 lb (84 kg)	RS So	Butler, PA
G	4	DeAndre Craig	6 ft 0 in (1.83 m)	170 lb (77 kg)	So	Chicago, IL
F	5	Josh Pickett	6 ft 5 in (1.96 m)	215 lb (98 kg)	Fr	Plainfield, IL
C	7	Adbulai Fanta Kabba	7 ft 0 in (2.13 m)	215 lb (98 kg)	Fr	Kenema, SL
F	9	Tymo Sternicki	6 ft 9 in (2.06 m)	215 lb (98 kg)	Fr	Gdynia, Poland
G	10	Keean Lloyd	6 ft 4 in (1.93 m)	190 lb (86 kg)	So	Aurora, CO
G	13	Josh Lee	6 ft 3 in (1.91 m)	195 lb (88 kg)	Jr	Canton, MI
F	15	Pedro Lopaz-Sanvicente	6 ft 8 in (2.03 m)	205 lb (93 kg)	Sr	Canary Islands, Spain
F	20	Loch Cunningham	6 ft 5 in (1.96 m)	195 lb (88 kg)	Fr	Austin, TX
F	22	Tolu Babs-Ajayi	6 ft 6 in (1.98 m)	215 lb (98 kg)	RS So	Cork, Ireland
C	24	Isaiah Carr	7 ft 0 in (2.13 m)	230 lb (104 kg)	Jr	Las Cruces, NM
G	25	Jon Mani	6 ft 7 in (2.01 m)	175 lb (79 kg)	Fr	Los Angeles, CA
G	32	Isaiah Addo-Ankrah	6 ft 7 in (2.01 m)	200 lb (91 kg)	GS	Houston, TX
G	40	Ben Bowen	6 ft 5 in (1.96 m)	175 lb (79 kg)	RS Jr	Highlands Ranch, CO

Head coach

- Jeff Wulbrun (Cal State Fullerton)

Assistant coach(es)

- Bill Peterson (Eckerd)
- Curran Walsh (Lindenwood–Belleville)
- Shammond Williams (North Carolina)

Legend

- (C) Team captain
- (S) Suspended
- (I) Ineligible
- (W) Walk-on
- Injured
- Current redshirt

Roster
Last update: October 8, 2024

== Schedule and results ==
Date time, TV	Rank^{#}	Opponent^{#}	Result	Record	Site (attendance) city, state
Non-conference regular season
November 4, 2024*; 2:00 p.m., ACCNX		at Stanford	L 62−85	0−1	Maples Pavilion (2,286); Palo Alto, CA
November 8, 2024*; 1:00 p.m., Summit League Network		Western Colorado	W 97–80	1–1	Hamilton Gymnasium (702); Denver, CO
November 12, 2024*; 7:00 p.m., MW Network		at Colorado State	L 65–74	1–2	Moby Arena (4,000); Fort Collins, CO
November 14, 2024*; 7:00 p.m., SLN		Colorado Christian	W 86−63	2−2	Hamilton Gymnasium (542); Denver, CO
November 17, 2024*; 2:00 p.m., SLN		Montana State	W 79−78	3−2	Hamilton Gymnasium (851); Denver, CO
November 24, 2024*; 5:00 p.m., ESPN+		at Montana; Montana MTE	L 73−83	3−3	Dahlberg Arena (2,456); Missoula, MT
November 25, 2024*; 2:00 p.m., ESPN+		vs. Cal State Northridge; Montana MTE	L 60–89	3–4	Dahlberg Arena (109); Missoula, MT
November 26, 2024*; 2:00 p.m., ESPN+		vs. Utah Tech; Montana MTE	L 54–68	3–5	Dahlberg Arena (102); Missoula, MT
December 1, 2024*; 3:00 p.m., ESPN+		at Portland	L 90–101 ^{2OT}	3–6	Chiles Center (1,049); Portland, OR
December 4, 2024*; 7:00 p.m., SLN		Sacramento State; Big Sky–Summit Challenge	W 80–59	4–6	Hamilton Gymnasium (422); Denver, CO
December 7, 2024*; 3:00 p.m., ESPN+		at Portland State	W 68–67	5–6	Viking Pavilion (652); Portland, OR
December 10, 2024*; 7:00 p.m., SLN		Colorado–Colorado Springs	W 94–87	6–6	Hamilton Gymnasium (549); Denver, CO
December 15, 2024*; 3:00 p.m., ESPN+		at Cal State Fullerton	L 59–74	6–7	Titan Gym (405); Fullerton, CA
December 17, 2024*; 8:00 p.m., ESPN+		at Cal Poly	L 94–95 ^{OT}	6–8	Robert A. Mott Athletics Center (1,432); San Luis Obispo, CA
December 21, 2024*; 3:00 p.m., SLN		Northern Colorado	L 75–82	6–9	Hamilton Gymnasium (1,148); Denver, CO
Summit League regular season
January 2, 2025; 7:00 p.m., CBSSN		at South Dakota State	L 70–91	6–10 (0–1)	First Bank & Trust Arena (1,925); Brookings, SD
January 4, 2025; 6:00 p.m., SLN		at South Dakota	L 84–91	6–11 (0–2)	Sanford Coyote Sports Center (1,508); Vermillion, SD
January 9, 2025; 7:00 p.m., SLN		North Dakota	L 70–95	6–12 (0–3)	Hamilton Gymnasium (698); Denver, CO
January 11, 2025; 1:00 p.m., SLN		North Dakota State	L 50–69	6–13 (0–4)	Hamilton Gymnasium (954); Denver, CO
January 15, 2025; 7:00 p.m., SLN		Omaha	L 62–80	6–14 (0–5)	Hamilton Gymnasium (527); Denver, CO
January 18, 2025; 6:00 p.m., SLN		at St. Thomas	L 62–74	6–15 (0–6)	Schoenecker Arena (1,694); St. Paul, MN
January 23, 2025; 6:00 p.m., SLN		at Oral Roberts	W 70–68	7–15 (1–6)	Mabee Center (2,264); Tulsa, OK
January 30, 2025; 7:00 p.m., SLN		Kansas City	W 69–68	8–15 (2–6)	Hamilton Gymnasium (1,014); Denver, CO
February 1, 2025; 6:00 p.m., SLN		at Omaha	L 69–78	8–16 (2–7)	Baxter Arena (3,356); Omaha, NE
February 6, 2025; 7:00 p.m., SLN		South Dakota	L 79–86	8–17 (2–8)	Hamilton Gymnasium (794); Denver, CO
February 8, 2025; 2:00 p.m., SLN		St. Thomas	L 76–79	8–18 (2–9)	Hamilton Gymnasium (977); Denver, CO
February 13, 2025; 6:00 p.m., SLN		at North Dakota	W 68–64	9–18 (3–9)	Betty Engelstad Sioux Center (1,814); Grand Forks, ND
February 15, 2025; 12:00 p.m., SLN		at North Dakota State	L 84–89 ^{OT}	9–19 (3–10)	Scheels Center (1,993); Fargo, ND
February 19, 2025; 7:00 p.m., SLN		Oral Roberts	W 71–60	10–19 (4–10)	Hamilton Gymnasium (605); Denver, CO
February 27, 2025; 6:00 p.m., SLN		at Kansas City	L 56–64	10–20 (4–11)	Swinney Recreation Center (1,034); Kansas City, MO
March 1, 2025; 1:00 p.m., SLN		South Dakota State	W 78–62	11–20 (5–11)	Hamilton Gymnasium (1,165); Denver, CO
Summit League tournament
March 6, 2025; 7:30 p.m., MidcoSN/SLN	(7)	vs. (2) St. Thomas; Quarterfinals	L 62–80	11–21	Denny Sanford Premier Center (5,814); Sioux Falls, SD
*Non-conference game. ^{#}Rankings from AP poll. (#) Tournament seedings in parentheses. All times are in Mountain.
