= Marquel Sutton =

American basketball player (born 2003)

No. 0 – Windy City Bulls
- Position: Power forward
- League: NBA G League

Personal information
- Born: January 11, 2003 (age 23) Tulsa, Oklahoma, U.S.
- Listed height: 6 ft 9 in (2.06 m)
- Listed weight: 205 lb (93 kg)

Career information
- High school: Will Rogers (Tulsa, Oklahoma)
- College: Connors State (2021–2022); Omaha (2022–2025); LSU (2025–2026)
- NBA draft: 2026: undrafted
- Playing career: 2026–present

Career history
- 2026–present: Windy City Bulls

Career highlights
- Summit League Player of the Year (2025); First-team All-Summit League (2025)
- Stats at NBA.com
- Stats at Basketball Reference

Marquel Sutton (born January 11, 2003) is an American professional basketball player for the Windy City Bulls of the NBA G League. He previously played college basketball for the Connors State Cowboys, Omaha Mavericks and LSU Tigers.

== High school career ==
Sutton played at Will Rogers High School. He helped the team reach its first state tournament in 25 years. Sutton committed to play college basketball at Connors State.

== College career ==
As a freshman, Sutton averaged 16.6 points and 9.1 rebounds per game. Following the season he transferred to Omaha. Sutton averaged 10.3 points and 5.0 rebounds per game as a sophomore. As a junior, he averaged 12.3 points and 6.3 rebounds per game. On February 22, 2025, Sutton scored a career-high 36 points and grabbed 12 rebounds in a 93-85 win over South Dakota. As a senior, he was named Summit League Player of the Year, becoming the first Omaha player to receive the honor. Sutton averaged 18.9 points and 7.9 rebounds per game. For his final season of eligibility, he transferred to LSU. Sutton averaged 13.8 points and 7.3 rebounds per game.

== Professional career ==
After not being selected in the 2026 NBA draft, Sutton signed an Exhibit 10 contract with the Sacramento Kings. In Summer League play, he averaged 5.6 points and 3.8 rebounds per game. Sutton signed with the Chicago Bulls for training camp.
