= 2025 NBA Summer League =

- League: National Basketball Association
- Sport: Basketball
- Duration: July 5–8 (Salt Lake City and California Classic) and 10–20 (Vegas)
- Games: 76 total games (Las Vegas) 6 games each (Salt Lake City and California Classic)
- Teams: California Classic-4; Salt Lake City-4; Las Vegas-30
- TV partner(s): NBA TV & ESPN
- Streaming partner: ESPN+

California Classic
- Top scorer: David Jones

Salt Lake City Summer League
- Season champions: Utah Jazz
- Runners-up: Memphis Grizzlies
- Top scorer: Brice Sensabaugh

Las Vegas NBA Summer League
- Season champions: Charlotte Hornets
- Runners-up: Sacramento Kings
- Season MVP: Kyle Filipowski (league); Kon Knueppel (championship game)
- Top scorer: Kyle Filipowski
- Finals venue: Thomas & Mack Center, Paradise, Nevada

NBA Summer League seasons
- ← 2024 2026 →

The 2025 NBA Summer League (branded as NBA 2K26 Summer League for sponsorship reasons) was an off-season competition held by the National Basketball Association (NBA) primarily at the Thomas and Mack Center and Cox Pavilion in Las Vegas, Nevada, on the campus of University of Nevada, Las Vegas from July 10 to 20, 2025. The summer league consisted of the California Classic, Salt Lake City Summer League, and the Las Vegas NBA Summer League.

== California Classic ==
The Golden State Warriors hosted the seventh annual California Classic at the Chase Center. The games took place on July 5, 6, and 8.

=== Teams ===
- Golden State Warriors
- Los Angeles Lakers
- Miami Heat
- San Antonio Spurs

=== Games ===
==== Day 1 ====
NBATV

July 5
1:30 PM PDT

Boxscore

San Antonio Spurs 69, Miami Heat 82
Scoring by quarter: 13–12, 16–20, 22–24, 18–26
Pts: David Jones 18; Rebs: David Jones 7 Asts: Jameer Nelson Jr. 5	Pts: Pelle Larsson 18; Rebs: Keshad Johnson 9 Asts: Kira Lewis Jr. 5

Chase Center, San Francisco, California
Attendance: 0
Referees: Gina Catanzariti, Rachael Rayford, RJ Johnson

ESPN2

July 5
3:30 PM PDT

Boxscore

Los Angeles Lakers 84, Golden State Warriors 89
Scoring by quarter: 19–11, 24–28, 17–30, 24–20
Pts: Cole Swider 24; Rebs: Cole Swider 8 Asts: DJ Steward 6	Pts: Rowe, Mobley 13 each Rebs: Rowe, Bolden 8 each Asts: Taran Armstrong 6

Chase Center, San Francisco, California
Attendance: 8,398
Referees: Ken Jones, Julian McFadden, Lars Murray

==== Day 2 ====
NBATV

July 6
1:30 PM PDT

Boxscore

Los Angeles Lakers 103, Miami Heat 83
Scoring by quarter: 26–20, 25–18, 25–24, 27–21
Pts: Cole Swider 20; Rebs: Darius Bazley 9 Asts: Davis, Rice 4 each	Pts: Bryson Warren 18; Rebs: Javonte Cooke 7 Asts: Marcus Williams 4

Chase Center, San Francisco, California
Attendance: 0
Referees: Ken Jones, Rachael Rayford, Gina Catanzaritu

NBATV

July 6
3:30 PM PDT

Boxscore

San Antonio Spurs 90, Golden State Warriors 88
Scoring by quarter: 21–13, 24–33, 24–22, 21–20
Pts: David Jones 25; Rebs: Harrison Ingram 6 Asts: Omari Moore 4	Pts: LJ Cryer 19; Rebs: Ja'Vier Francis 7 Asts: Jules Bernard 3

Chase Center, San Francisco, California
Attendance: 8,124
Referees: RJ Johnson, Lars Murray, Julian McFadden

==== Day 3 ====
ESPN+/ESPN3

July 8
4:00 PM PDT

Boxscore

Miami Heat 93, Golden State Warriors 79
Scoring by quarter: 23–22, 25–14, 22–21, 23–22
Pts: Kira Lewis Jr. 16; Rebs: Goldin, Larsson 5 each Asts: Larsson, Lewis Jr. 4 each	Pts: Jackson Rowe 14; Rebs: Delaunay, Toohey 6 each Asts: Taran Armstrong 7

Chase Center, San Francisco, California
Attendance: 0
Referees: Rachael Rayford, Julian McFadden, Ken Jones

ESPN

July 8
7:00 PM PDT

Boxscore

Los Angeles Lakers 89, San Antonio Spurs 88
Scoring by quarter: 22–25, 20–22, 15–21, 32–20
Pts: Darius Bazley 27; Rebs: Darius Bazley 13; Asts: Davis, Gordon, Steward 3 each	Pts: David Jones 25; Rebs: Osayi Osifo 7 Asts: David Jones 5

Chase Center, San Francisco, California
Attendance: 0
Referees: Lars Murray, Gina Catanzariti, RJ Johnson

== Salt Lake City Summer League ==
The Utah Jazz hosted a round-robin tournament at the Jon M. Huntsman Center on July 5, 7, and 8.

=== Teams ===
- Utah Jazz
- Oklahoma City Thunder
- Memphis Grizzlies
- Philadelphia 76ers

=== Games ===
==== Day 1 ====
ESPNU

July 5
5:00 PM MDT

Boxscore

Memphis Grizzlies 92, Oklahoma City Thunder 80
Scoring by quarter: 19–18, 26–22, 27–22, 20–18
Pts: Wells, Jackson 20 each Rebs: Bacot, Spencer 5 each Asts: Javon Small 6	Pts: Ajay Mitchell 24; Rebs: Brooks Barnhizer 13; Asts: Ajay Mitchell 6

Jon M. Huntsman Center, Salt Lake City, Utah
Attendance: 0
Referees: Nate Clearly, Quincy Smith, Ryo Hasebe

ESPN

July 5
7:00 PM MDT

Boxscore

Philadelphia 76ers 89, Utah Jazz 93
Scoring by quarter: 23–29, 20–23, 19–14, 27–27
Pts: V. J. Edgecombe 28; Rebs: V. J. Edgecombe 10; Asts: Jalen Hood-Schifino 8	Pts: Kyle Filipowski 22; Rebs: Bailey, Sensabaugh 7 each Asts: Walter Clayton Jr. 6

Jon M. Huntsman Center, Salt Lake City, Utah
Attendance: 9,196
Referees: Italo Araujo, Cameron Garber, Ian McClenny

==== Day 2 ====
ESPN

July 7
5:00 PM MDT

Boxscore

Oklahoma City Thunder 89, Philadelphia 76ers 78
Scoring by quarter: 21–21, 22–17, 18–14, 31–26
Pts: Ajay Mitchell 16; Rebs: Mady Sissoko 9 Asts: Topić, Mitchell 5 each	Pts: Judah Mintz 21; Rebs: Justin Edwards 6 Asts: Justin Edwards 5

Jon M. Huntsman Center, Salt Lake City, Utah
Attendance: 0
Referees: Nate Cearley, Cameron Garber, Quincy Smith

NBATV

July 7
7:00 PM MDT

Boxscore

Memphis Grizzlies 111, Utah Jazz 112
Scoring by quarter: 35–21, 22–30, 26–25, 28–36
Pts: GG Jackson 27; Rebs: Cam Spencer 6 Asts: Pullin, Mashack 9 each	Pts: Brice Sensabaugh 37; Rebs: Kyle Filipowski 13; Asts: Walter Clayton Jr. 6

Jon M. Huntsman Center, Salt Lake City, Utah
Attendance: 8,084
Referees: Ryo Hasebe, Ian McClenny, Italo Araujo

==== Day 3 ====
NBATV

July 8
5:00 PM MDT

Boxscore

Memphis Grizzlies 90, Philadelphia 76ers 91
Scoring by quarter: 31–20, 15–26, 18–29, 26–19
Pts: Tyler Burton 23; Rebs: Tyler Burton 9 Asts: Aaron Estrada 7	Pts: Judah Mintz 26; Rebs: Johni Broome 12; Asts: Jalen Hood-Schifino 7

Jon M. Huntsman Center, Salt Lake City, Utah
Attendance: 0
Referees: Quincy Smith, Italo Araujo, Cameron Garber

NBATV

July 8
7:00 PM MDT

Boxscore

Oklahoma City Thunder 82, Utah Jazz 86
Scoring by quarter: 25–22, 11–17, 21–34, 25–13
Pts: Ajay Mitchell 19; Rebs: Mady Sissoko 7 Asts: Ajay Mitchell 8	Pts: Walter Clayton Jr. 20; Rebs: Kyle Filipowski 15; Asts: Isaiah Collier 6

Jon M. Huntsman Center, Salt Lake City, Utah
Attendance: 7,748
Referees: Ian McClenny, Nate Cearley, Ryo Hasebe

== Las Vegas Summer League ==
The Las Vegas NBA Summer League is an official summer league of the NBA—the nineteenth year it has been held. The league played games across two venues: the Thomas and Mack Center and Cox Pavilion, both located in Paradise, Nevada, which is near Las Vegas.

=== Format ===
- Number of Games: A total of 76 games will be played, each team will play at least five games, and each team will play four games from July 10–17.
- Four-Team Tournament: After each team plays four games, the top four teams will advance to the playoffs and participate in a semifinal game on July 19, and the two semifinal game winners will participate in the championship game on July 20. The top four playoff seeds will be determined by winning percentage with tiebreakers set forth below.
- Consolation Games: The 26 teams that did not advance to the four-team playoff will play a fifth game on either July 18, 19 or 20.

==== Tiebreak criteria ====
1. Two Teams Tied – In the case of a tie in preliminary round records involving only two teams, the following criteria, in order, were utilized:

• Head-to-head matchup: The team that won the game between the two teams in the preliminary round, if applicable, receives the higher seed.

• Point differential: The team with the greater point differential receives the higher seed.

• Total Points: The team with the most total points will receive the higher seed

- Random drawing: If necessary, the higher seed will be determined by a "coin flip".

2. More Than Two Teams Tied – In the case of a tie in preliminary round records involving more than two teams, the following criteria, in order, were utilized:

• Point differential: The team with the greater point differential receives the higher seed.

• Total Points: The team with the most total points will receive the higher seed

• Random drawing: The higher seed shall be determined by a “coin flip.”

=== Teams ===
- Atlanta Hawks
- Boston Celtics
- Brooklyn Nets
- Charlotte Hornets
- Chicago Bulls
- Cleveland Cavaliers
- Dallas Mavericks
- Detroit Pistons
- Denver Nuggets
- Golden State Warriors
- Houston Rockets
- Indiana Pacers
- Los Angeles Clippers
- Los Angeles Lakers
- Memphis Grizzlies
- Miami Heat
- Milwaukee Bucks
- Minnesota Timberwolves
- New Orleans Pelicans
- New York Knicks
- Oklahoma City Thunder
- Orlando Magic
- Philadelphia 76ers
- Phoenix Suns
- Portland Trail Blazers
- Sacramento Kings
- San Antonio Spurs
- Toronto Raptors
- Utah Jazz
- Washington Wizards

=== Games ===
==== Day 1 ====
ESPN2

July 10
12:30 PM PDT

Boxscore

New Orleans Pelicans 91, Minnesota Timberwolves 98
Scoring by quarter: 20–17, 20–31, 28–27, 23–23
Pts: Lester Quiñones 20; Rebs: Yves Missi 14; Asts: Derik Queen 3	Pts: Shannon Jr., Miller 20 each Rebs: Leonard Miller 9 Asts: Terrence Shannon Jr. 9

Thomas & Mack Center, Las Vegas, Nevada
Attendance: 0
Referees: Kenny Gardner, Jason Alabanza, Jiang Sun

NBA TV

July 10
2:00 PM PDT

Boxscore

Cleveland Cavaliers 115, Indiana Pacers 116
Scoring by quarter: 35–25, 28–25, 23–34, 29–32
Pts: Nae'Qwan Tomlin 30; Rebs: Norchad Omier 9 Asts: Jaylon Tyson 12	Pts: RayJ Dennis 26; Rebs: Enrique Freeman 7 Asts: RayJ Dennis 9

Cox Pavilion, Las Vegas, Nevada
Attendance: 0
Referees: CP Painter, Kevin Fahy, Kaitlynn Versoza

ESPN2

July 10
2:30 PM PDT

Boxscore

Oklahoma City Thunder 90, Brooklyn Nets 81
Scoring by quarter: 22–15, 22–22, 23–21, 23–23
Pts: Ajay Mitchell 20; Rebs: Brooks Barnhizer 7 Asts: Nikola Topić 6	Pts: Drew Timme 22; Rebs: Drew Timme 9 Asts: Evbuomwan, Traoré 3 each

Thomas & Mack Center, Las Vegas, Nevada
Attendance: 0
Referees: Intae Hwang, John Conley, Tommy Wu

NBATV

July 10
4:30 PM PDT

Boxscore

Orlando Magic 81, Sacramento Kings 84
Scoring by quarter: 12–21, 21–21, 21–17, 27–25
Pts: Tristan da Silva 19; Rebs: Kylor Kelley 10; Asts: Tristan da Silva 5	Pts: Clifford, Jones 17 each Rebs: Isaac Jones 6 Asts: Mason Jones 5

Cox Pavilion, Las Vegas, Nevada
Attendance: 0
Referees: Simone Jelks, Marat Kogut, Yohan Rosso

ESPN

July 10
5:00 PM PDT

Boxscore

Los Angeles Lakers 85, Dallas Mavericks 87
Scoring by quarter: 17–19, 30–24, 15–25, 23–19
Pts: Cole Swider 22; Rebs: Darius Bazley 11; Asts: DJ Steward 5	Pts: Ryan Nembhard 21; Rebs: Flagg, Sharp 6 each Asts: Ryan Nembhard 5

Thomas & Mack Center, Las Vegas, Nevada
Attendance: 0
Referees: Che Flores, Robert Hussey, Austin Spiker

NBATV

July 10
6:30 PM PDT

Boxscore

Denver Nuggets 89, Milwaukee Bucks 90
Scoring by quarter: 18–19, 19–27, 27–18, 25–26
Pts: DaRon Holmes II 15; Rebs: Tyson, Liddell 11 each Asts: Reece Beekman 6	Pts: Livingston, Ryan 18 each Rebs: Pete Nance 7 Asts: Markquis Nowell 7

Cox Pavilion, Las Vegas, Nevada
Attendance: 0
Referees: Jenna Reneau, Kelsey Reynolds, James Griguol

ESPN

July 10
7:00 PM PDT

Boxscore

San Antonio Spurs 111, Philadelphia 76ers 70
Scoring by quarter: 34–12, 30–23, 23–20, 24–15
Pts: David Jones 24; Rebs: Harrison Ingram 6 Asts: Ingram, Nelson Jr. 4 each	Pts: Keve Aluma 12; Rebs: Barlow, Bona, Broome 5 each Asts: Judah Mintz 3

Thomas & Mack Center, Las Vegas, Nevada
Attendance: 0
Referees: Ken Jones, Matt Rafferty, Mikhel Manniste

==== Day 2 ====
NBATV

July 11
1:00 PM PDT

Boxscore

Memphis Grizzlies 78, Boston Celtics 92
Scoring by quarter: 18–22, 18–27, 25–19, 17–24
Pts: GG Jackson 16; Rebs: Armando Bacot 6 Asts: Zyon Pullin 4	Pts: Jordan Walsh 17; Rebs: Charles Bassey 11; Asts: Hugo González 5

Cox Pavilion, Las Vegas, Nevada
Attendance: 0
Referees: Marat Kogut, Evan Scott, Omar Bermudez

ESPN2

July 11
1:30 PM PDT

Boxscore

Atlanta Hawks 105, Miami Heat 98
Scoring by quarter: 29–25, 23–27, 16–24, 37–22
Pts: Kobe Bufkin 29; Rebs: Jacob Toppin 10; Asts: Bufkin, Murray Jr. 3 each	Pts: Kasparas Jakučionis 24; Rebs: Cooke, Ware 6 each Asts: Kira Lewis Jr. 7

Thomas & Mack Center, Las Vegas, Nevada
Attendance: 0
Referees: Suyash Mehta, JT Orr, Orlando Varela

NBATV

July 11
3:00 PM PDT

Boxscore

New York Knicks 86, Detroit Pistons 104
Scoring by quarter: 15–21, 17–25, 24–28, 30–30
Pts: Pacôme Dadiet 17; Rebs: Mohamed Diawara 7 Asts: Tyler Kolek 8	Pts: Ronald Holland II 28; Rebs: Holland II, Smith 11 each Asts: Bobi Klintman 5

Cox Pavilion, Las Vegas, Nevada
Attendance: 0
Referees: Biniam Manou, Marcy Williams, Ryo Hasebe

ESPN

July 11
4:00 PM PDT

Boxscore

Utah Jazz 105, Charlotte Hornets 111
Scoring by quarter: 25–31, 23–29, 36–27, 21–24
Pts: Kyle Filipowski 32; Rebs: Adama Sanogo 8 Asts: Isaiah Collier 9	Pts: Liam McNeeley 22; Rebs: Liam McNeeley 12; Asts: Liam McNeeley 6

Thomas & Mack Center, Las Vegas, Nevada
Attendance: 0
Referees: Phinizee Ransom, Tyler Ricks, Carlos Peralta-Ortega

NBATV

July 11
5:00 PM PDT

Boxscore

Chicago Bulls 72, Toronto Raptors 116
Scoring by quarter: 24–21, 9–27, 24–32, 15–36
Pts: Javon Freeman-Liberty 21; Rebs: Buzelis, Muoka 5 each Asts: Jahmir Young 3	Pts: A. J. Lawson 22; Rebs: Colin Castleton 8 Asts: Jamal Shead 6

Cox Pavilion, Las Vegas, Nevada
Attendance: 0
Referees: Michael Smith, CJ Washington, Hortencia Sanchez-Carrizalez

ESPN

July 11
6:00 PM PDT

Boxscore

Washington Wizards 84, Phoenix Suns 103
Scoring by quarter: 23–23, 16–24, 21–28, 24–28
Pts: Kyshawn George 24; Rebs: Kyshawn George 7 Asts: Bub Carrington 5	Pts: Koby Brea 19; Rebs: Oso Ighodaro 14; Asts: Yuri Collins 6

Thomas & Mack Center, Las Vegas, Nevada
Attendance: 0
Referees: JD Ralls, Claire Aubry, William McClatchy

NBATV

July 11
7:00 PM PDT

Boxscore

Los Angeles Clippers 95, Houston Rockets 92
Scoring by quarter: 21–16, 27–26, 25–28, 22–22
Pts: Jordan Miller 23; Rebs: Jordan Miller 11; Asts: Zavier Simpson 5	Pts: Reed Sheppard 28; Rebs: Reed Sheppard 8 Asts: Reed Sheppard 4

Cox Pavilion, Las Vegas, Nevada
Attendance: 0
Referees: Kladji Mulla, Josh Reed, M.P. Malo

ESPN2

July 11
8:00 PM PDT

Boxscore

Portland Trail Blazers 106, Golden State Warriors 73
Scoring by quarter: 34–13, 19–27, 27–12, 26–21
Pts: Rayan Rupert 23; Rebs: James Bouknight 9 Asts: Yang Hansen 5	Pts: Richard, Rowe 12 each Rebs: Isaiah Mobley 5 Asts: Taran Armstrong 7

Thomas & Mack Center, Las Vegas, Nevada
Attendance: 0
Referees: Gerda Gatiling, Cameron Gelinas, Paulina Gajdosz

==== Day 3 ====
NBATV

July 12
12:30 PM PDT

Boxscore

Cleveland Cavaliers 93, Milwaukee Bucks 83
Scoring by quarter: 21–23, 24–10, 26–19, 22–31
Pts: Nae'Qwan Tomlin 22; Rebs: Nae'Qwan Tomlin 13; Asts: Proctor, Tomlin 4 each	Pts: Chris Livingston 21; Rebs: Chris Livingston 9 Asts: Chris Livingston 5

Cox Pavilion, Las Vegas, Nevada
Attendance: 0
Referees: Cameron Garber, Sarah Williams, Erica Parker

ESPN

July 12
1:00 PM PDT

Boxscore

Dallas Mavericks 69, San Antonio Spurs 76
Scoring by quarter: 11–21, 21–12, 17–26, 20–17
Pts: Cooper Flagg 31; Rebs: Cissé, McGlothan 5 each Asts: Ryan Nembhard 6	Pts: David Jones 21; Rebs: Harrison Ingram 9 Asts: David Jones 5

Thomas & Mack Center, Las Vegas, Nevada
Attendance: 0
Referees: Ian McClenny, Blanca Burns, James Griguol

NBATV

July 12
2:30 PM PDT

Boxscore

Indiana Pacers 85, Oklahoma City Thunder 104
Scoring by quarter: 16–14, 22–38, 26–31, 21–21
Pts: Robert Baker 16; Rebs: Enrique Freeman 11; Asts: Furphy, Dennis 4 each	Pts: Chris Youngblood 21; Rebs: Malevy Leons 10; Asts: Nikola Topić 10

Cox Pavilion, Las Vegas, Nevada
Attendance: 0
Referees: John Conley, Erik Aelig, Jacob Budnik

ESPN2

July 12
3:30 PM PDT

Boxscore

Charlotte Hornets 96, Philadelphia 76ers 94
Scoring by quarter: 27–14, 22–24, 18–21, 29–35
Pts: KJ Simpson 19; Rebs: KJ Simpson 7 Asts: KJ Simpson 4	Pts: Judah Mintz 24; Rebs: Dominick Barlow 9 Asts: Mintz, Sallis 4 each

Thomas & Mack Center, Las Vegas, Nevada
Attendance: 0
Referees: Sha'Rae Mitchell, Simone Jelks, Yohan Rosso

NBATV

July 12
5:00 PM PDT

Boxscore

Sacramento Kings 109, Chicago Bulls 92
Scoring by quarter: 32–14, 24–38, 25–17, 28–33
Pts: Devin Carter 30; Rebs: Nique Clifford 12; Asts: Mason Jones 6	Pts: Javon Freeman-Liberty 21; Rebs: Noa Essengue 10; Asts: Jahmir Young 7

Cox Pavilion, Las Vegas, Nevada
Attendance: 0
Referees: Brent Haskill, Kelsey Reynolds, Takaki Kato

ESPN2

July 12
5:30 PM PDT

Boxscore

Los Angeles Lakers 94, New Orleans Pelicans 81
Scoring by quarter: 22–19, 18–17, 24–23, 30–22
Pts: Cole Swider 21; Rebs: Bazley, Swider 10 each Asts: R. J. Davis 5	Pts: Antonio Reeves 20; Rebs: Derik Queen 13; Asts: Lester Quiñones 2

Thomas & Mack Center, Las Vegas, Nevada
Attendance: 0
Referees: Jason Alabanza, Ashley Olsen, Mikhel Manniste

NBATV

July 12
7:00 PM PDT

Boxscore

Minnesota Timberwolves 94, Denver Nuggets 83
Scoring by quarter: 25–20, 27–18, 18–23, 24–22
Pts: Terrence Shannon Jr. 24; Rebs: Shannon Jr., Beringer, Miller 7 each Asts: Rob Dillingham 9	Pts: Spencer Jones 19; Rebs: Tyson, Liddell 7 each Asts: Reece Beekman 10

Cox Pavilion, Las Vegas, Nevada
Attendance: 0
Referees: Pat O'Connell, Jafar Kinsey, Leah Lanie

ESPN2

July 12
7:30 PM PDT

Boxscore

Memphis Grizzlies 96, Portland Trail Blazers 86
Scoring by quarter: 24–24, 16–21, 20–17, 36–24
Pts: Jaylen Wells 23; Rebs: Armando Bacot 12; Asts: Phlandrous Fleming Jr. 5	Pts: Sidy Cissoko 20; Rebs: Yang, Tyson 5 each Asts: James Bouknight 4

Thomas & Mack Center, Las Vegas, Nevada
Attendance: 0
Referees: Danielle Scott, JP Primm, Jian Sun

==== Day 4 ====
NBATV

July 13
12:30 PM PDT

Boxscore

Phoenix Suns 80, Atlanta Hawks 98
Scoring by quarter: 17–30, 19–18, 30–24, 13–26
Pts: Oso Ighodaro 18; Rebs: Oso Ighodaro 9 Asts: Collins, Ellis 4 each	Pts: Asa Newell 18; Rebs: Asa Newell 11; Asts: Kobe Bufkin 9

Cox Pavilion, Las Vegas, Nevada
Referees: Evan Scott, JD Ralls, Joe Prince

ESPN2

July 13
1:00 PM PDT

Boxscore

Detroit Pistons 98, Houston Rockets 83
Scoring by quarter: 27–14, 28–24, 20–20, 23–25
Pts: Daniss Jenkins 23; Rebs: Tolu Smith 12; Asts: Daniss Jenkins 6	Pts: Reed Sheppard 18; Rebs: Chris Ledlum 6 Asts: Chandler, Dante, Harris 3 each

Thomas & Mack Center, Las Vegas, Nevada
Referees: Tyler Ricks, Che Flores, Orlando Varela

NBATV

July 13
2:30 PM PDT

Boxscore

New York Knicks 81, Boston Celtics 94
Scoring by quarter: 25–35, 12–15, 23–29, 28–23
Pts: Kevin McCullar Jr. 30; Rebs: Ariel Hukporti 13; Asts: Tyler Kolek 4	Pts: Charles Bassey 22; Rebs: Charles Bassey 13; Asts: Baylor Scheierman 8

Cox Pavilion, Las Vegas, Nevada
Referees: Robert Hussey, Phenizee Ransom, Rachael Rayford

ESPN2

July 13
3:00 PM PDT

Boxscore

Toronto Raptors 89, Orlando Magic 86
Scoring by quarter: 21–25, 23–14, 19–22, 26–25
Pts: A. J. Lawson 21; Rebs: Jonathan Mogbo 8 Asts: Hepburn, Shead 4 each	Pts: Wendell Moore Jr. 22; Rebs: Noah Penda 14; Asts: Jase Richardson 4

Thomas & Mack Center, Las Vegas, Nevada
Referees: Italo Araujo, CP Painter, Omar Bermudez

NBATV

July 13
4:30 PM PDT

Boxscore

Miami Heat 72, Cleveland Cavaliers 92
Scoring by quarter: 20–24, 21–20, 13–30, 18–18
Pts: Kel'el Ware 21; Rebs: Kel'el Ware 9 Asts: Keshad Johnson 4	Pts: Jaylon Tyson 21; Rebs: Saliou Niang 11; Asts: Nae'Qwan Tomlin 6

Cox Pavilion, Las Vegas, Nevada
Referees: Michael Smith, Catherine Chang, Bobby Bissant

ESPN2

July 13
5:00 PM PDT

Boxscore

Brooklyn Nets 96, Washington Wizards 102
Scoring by quarter: 29–22, 21–28, 19–24, 27–28
Pts: Drew Timme 30; Rebs: Danny Wolf 10; Asts: Ben Saraf 6	Pts: Tre Johnson 21; Rebs: Alex Sarr 12; Asts: Kyshawn George 6

Thomas & Mack Center, Las Vegas, Nevada
Referees: Agon Abazi, Kastine Evans, Matt Rafferty

NBATV

July 13
6:30 PM PDT

Boxscore

Milwaukee Bucks 91, Los Angeles Clippers 106
Scoring by quarter: 27–26, 20–25, 27–22, 17–33
Pts: Chris Livingston 21; Rebs: Pete Nance 8 Asts: Markquis Nowell 9	Pts: Patrick Baldwin Jr. 22; Rebs: Patrick Baldwin Jr. 13; Asts: Zavier Simpson 5

Cox Pavilion, Las Vegas, Nevada
Referees: Teresa Stuck, Kaitlynn Versoza, Hortencia Sanchez-Carrizalez

ESPN2

July 13
7:00 PM PDT

Boxscore

Golden State Warriors 103, Utah Jazz 93
Scoring by quarter: 23–14, 27–26, 21–24, 32–29
Pts: Gabe Madsen 22; Rebs: Armstrong, Delaunay, Hawkins 7 each Asts: Coleman Hawkins 4	Pts: Cody Williams 22; Rebs: Cody Williams 8 Asts: Collier, Sanogo, Williams 4 each

Thomas & Mack Center, Las Vegas, Nevada
Referees: Ajay Gonnelli, Lars Murray, Claudio Eiuba

==== Day 5 ====
NBATV

July 14
1:30 PM PDT

Boxscore

Atlanta Hawks 111, Houston Rockets 108 (OT)
Scoring by quarter: 28–28, 27–31, 17–22, 32–23, Overtime: 7–4
Pts: Kobe Bufkin 25; Rebs: Bufkin, Newell 6 each Asts: Nikola Đurišić 7	Pts: Adonis Arms 24; Rebs: Great Osobor 9 Asts: Arms, Chandler 7 each

Thomas & Mack Center, Las Vegas, Nevada
Referees: J.T. Orr, Danielle Scott, Mikhel Manniste

ESPNU

July 14
3:00 PM PDT

Boxscore

Chicago Bulls 114, Indiana Pacers 105
Scoring by quarter: 32–18, 25–35, 28–28, 29–24
Pts: Matas Buzelis 28; Rebs: Lachlan Olbrich 9 Asts: Yuki Kawamura 10	Pts: RayJ Dennis 20; Rebs: Enrique Freeman 10; Asts: Kam Jones 6

Cox Pavilion, Las Vegas, Nevada
Referees: Sha'Rae Mitchell, Gerda Gatling, Yohan Rosso

NBATV

July 14
3:30 PM PDT

Boxscore

Charlotte Hornets 87, Dallas Mavericks 69
Scoring by quarter: 23–17, 16–13, 31–24, 17–15
Pts: KJ Simpson 18; Rebs: Kon Knueppel 10; Asts: KJ Simpson 7	Pts: Ryan Nembhard 11; Rebs: Matt Cross 9 Asts: Ryan Nembhard 8

Thomas & Mack Center, Las Vegas, Nevada
Referees: CJ Washington, Suyash Mehta, Ashley Birch

ESPNU

July 14
5:00 PM PDT

Boxscore

Boston Celtics 96, Miami Heat 100
Scoring by quarter: 21–30, 20–24, 31–18, 24–28
Pts: Baylor Scheierman 19; Rebs: Charles Bassey 9 Asts: Baylor Scheierman 9	Pts: Pelle Larsson 24; Rebs: Kel'el Ware 14; Asts: Pelle Larsson 6

Cox Pavilion, Las Vegas, Nevada
Referees: Paul Tuomey, Sarah Williams, James Griguol

NBATV

July 14
5:30 PM PDT

Boxscore

Utah Jazz 91, San Antonio Spurs 93 (OT)
Scoring by quarter: 21–18, 20–17, 20–28, 25–23, Overtime: 5–7
Pts: Kyle Filipowski 35; Rebs: Kyle Filipowski 11; Asts: Isaiah Collier 12	Pts: Dylan Harper 16; Rebs: Harrison Ingram 14; Asts: Harrison Ingram 6

Thomas & Mack Center, Las Vegas, Nevada
Referees: Gina Catanzariti, Genesis Perrymond, Jessyca Christopher

ESPNU

July 14
7:00 PM PDT

Boxscore

Phoenix Suns 76, Sacramento Kings 94
Scoring by quarter: 17–18, 11–27, 15–31, 33–18
Pts: Ryan Dunn 18; Rebs: Ryan Dunn 6 Asts: Yuri Collins 5	Pts: Nique Clifford 19; Rebs: Isaac Jones 8 Asts: Mason Jones 6

Cox Pavilion, Las Vegas, Nevada
Referees: Jenna Reneau, Teresa Stuck, Quincy Smith

NBATV

July 14
7:30 PM PDT

Boxscore

Los Angeles Clippers 67, Los Angeles Lakers 58
Scoring by quarter: 22–13, 10–18, 16–12, 19–15
Pts: Jordan Miller 19; Rebs: Baldwin Jr., Miller 7 each Asts: Christie, Simpson 6 each	Pts: Bronny James 17; Rebs: Dalton Knecht 7 Asts: James, Steward 5 each

Thomas & Mack Center, Las Vegas, Nevada
Referees: Kevin Fahy, Blanca Burns, Jian Sun

==== Day 6 ====
NBATV

July 15
1:30 PM PDT

Boxscore

Minnesota Timberwolves 89, Detroit Pistons 73
Scoring by quarter: 21–23, 18–8, 21–26, 29–16
Pts: Terrence Shannon Jr. 24; Rebs: Leonard Miller 8 Asts: Bailey, Dillingham 4 each	Pts: Ronald Holland II 22; Rebs: Bobi Klintman 12; Asts: Daniss Jenkins 7

Thomas & Mack Center, Las Vegas, Nevada
Referees: Julian Scott, Ryan Johnson, Orlando Varela

ESPN2

July 15
3:00 PM PDT

Boxscore

Brooklyn Nets 93, New York Knicks 97
Scoring by quarter: 21–24, 18–17, 21–28, 33–28
Pts: Drew Timme 24; Rebs: Drew Timme 10; Asts: Drew Timme 4	Pts: Beauchamp, Kolek 25 each Rebs: Dink Pate 6 Asts: Tyler Kolek 4

Cox Pavilion, Las Vegas, Nevada
Referees: Nate Cearley, Kaz Beverley, Claudio Eiuba

NBATV

July 15
3:30 PM PDT

Boxscore

Oklahoma City Thunder 92, Orlando Magic 75
Scoring by quarter: 17–15, 25–19, 31–27, 19–14
Pts: Ajay Mitchell 27; Rebs: Brown, Carlson, Mitchell 7 each Asts: Nikola Topić 6	Pts: Ethan Thompson 16; Rebs: Wendell Moore Jr. 10; Asts: Alondes Williams 4

Thomas & Mack Center, Las Vegas, Nevada
Referees: Agon Abazi, Josh Reed, Erica Parker

ESPN+/ESPN3

July 15
5:00 PM PDT

Boxscore

Toronto Raptors 101, Denver Nuggets 97
Scoring by quarter: 21–25, 18–19, 34–18, 28–35
Pts: Ja'Kobe Walter 26; Rebs: A. J. Lawson 7 Asts: Jamal Shead 8	Pts: Curtis Jones 20; Rebs: DaRon Holmes II 11; Asts: Bates, Beekman 3 each

Cox Pavilion, Las Vegas, Nevada
Referees: Tyler Mirkovich, M.P. Malo, Omar Bermudez

NBATV

July 15
5:30 PM PDT

Boxscore

Philadelphia 76ers 74, Washington Wizards 58
Scoring by quarter: 7–13, 26–17, 20–17, 21–11
Pts: Justin Edwards 17; Rebs: Johni Broome 10; Asts: Judah Mintz 5	Pts: AJ Johnson 20; Rebs: Johnson, Watkins 5 each Asts: Black, Robbins 3 each

Thomas & Mack Center, Las Vegas, Nevada
Referees: Italo Araujo, Charles Watson, Ashley Olsen

ESPN

July 15
7:00 PM PDT

Boxscore

Portland Trail Blazers 93, New Orleans Pelicans 87
Scoring by quarter: 19–11, 24–23, 15–28, 35–25
Pts: Rayan Rupert 24; Rebs: Caleb Love 12; Asts: Carton, Cissoko, Love 5 each	Pts: Antonio Reeves 18; Rebs: Derik Queen 10; Asts: Queen, Quiñones 3 each

Cox Pavilion, Las Vegas, Nevada
Referees: Jafar Kinsey, Matt Rafferty, Austin Spiker

NBATV

July 15
7:30 PM PDT

Boxscore

Golden State Warriors 96, Memphis Grizzlies 84
Scoring by quarter: 14–23, 29–20, 25–21, 28–20
Pts: Jackson Rowe 14; Rebs: Jackson Rowe 6 Asts: Shackelford, Cryer 4 each	Pts: Cam Spencer 23; Rebs: GG Jackson 8 Asts: GG Jackson 6

Thomas & Mack Center, Las Vegas, Nevada
Referees: Ken Jones, Kenny Gardner, Hortencia Sanchez-Carrizales

==== Day 7 ====
ESPN2

July 16
12:30 PM PDT

Boxscore

Sacramento Kings 94, Cleveland Cavaliers 86
Scoring by quarter: 23–23, 27–17, 18–25, 26–21
Pts: Isaac Jones 17; Rebs: Nique Clifford 7 Asts: Nique Clifford 9	Pts: Tyrese Proctor 35; Rebs: Nae'Qwan Tomlin 12; Asts: Tyrese Proctor 4

Thomas & Mack Center, Las Vegas, Nevada
Referees: Brent Haskill, Ian McClenny, Carlos Peralta-Ortega

NBATV

July 16
2:00 PM PDT

Boxscore

Phoenix Suns 85, Minnesota Timberwolves 89
Scoring by quarter: 32–16, 10–16, 17–25, 26–32
Pts: Boogie Ellis 23; Rebs: Fleming, Maluach 7 each Asts: Yuri Collins 9	Pts: Rob Dillingham 23; Rebs: Leonard Miller 11; Asts: Rob Dillingham 7

Cox Pavilion, Las Vegas, Nevada
Referees: Marcy Williams, Erik Aellig, Evan Singletary

ESPN2

July 16
2:30 PM PDT

Boxscore

Milwaukee Bucks 96, Chicago Bulls 102
Scoring by quarter: 27–22, 28–23, 20–24, 21–33
Pts: Chris Livingston 23; Rebs: Malik Williams 6 Asts: Nowell, Taylor IV 5 each	Pts: Jahmir Young 40; Rebs: Emanuel Miller 10; Asts: Yuki Kawamura 6

Thomas & Mack Center, Las Vegas, Nevada
Referees: Paul Tuomey, Julian McFadden, Jacob Budnik

NBATV

July 16
4:30 PM PDT

Boxscore

Orlando Magic 90, Brooklyn Nets 94
Scoring by quarter: 21–27, 20–22, 10–20, 39–25
Pts: Moore Jr., Penda 17 each Rebs: Zach Freemantle 9 Asts: Johnell Davis 4	Pts: Danny Wolf 18; Rebs: Grant Nelson 7 Asts: Quincy Olivari 6

Cox Pavilion, Las Vegas, Nevada
Referees: Pat O'Connell, Ajay Gonnelli, Genesis Perrymond

ESPN

July 16
5:00 PM PDT

Boxscore

Dallas Mavericks 82, Philadelphia 76ers 90
Scoring by quarter: 15–24, 23–12, 26–30, 18–24
Pts: Maxwell Lewis 23; Rebs: Matt Cross 9 Asts: Jordan Hall 9	Pts: Armstrong, Broome 22 each Rebs: Johni Broome 14; Asts: Judah Mintz 4

Thomas & Mack Center, Las Vegas, Nevada
Referees: Cameron Barber, JP Primm, Tommy Wu

NBATV

July 16
6:30 PM PDT

Boxscore

New Orleans Pelicans 81, Oklahoma City Thunder 95
Scoring by quarter: 20–12, 14–20, 23–34, 24–29
Pts: Trey Alexander 25; Rebs: Christian Shumate 10; Asts: Jeremiah Fears 6	Pts: Brooks Barnhizer 19; Rebs: Brooks Barnhizer 9 Asts: Cameron Brown 5

Cox Pavilion, Las Vegas, Nevada
Referees: Jenna Reneau, Bobby Bissant, William McClatchy

ESPN

July 16
7:00 PM PDT

Boxscore

Washington Wizards 76, Utah Jazz 86
Scoring by quarter: 21–19, 17–23, 12–32, 26–12
Pts: AJ Johnson 25; Rebs: Leaky Black 11; Asts: Black, Richmond 4 each	Pts: Cody Williams 23; Rebs: Gainey, McGriff 10 each Asts: Elijah Harkless 6

Thomas & Mack Center, Las Vegas, Nevada
Referees: Klajdi Mulla, Quincy Smith, Jacob Lear

==== Day 8 ====
NBATV

July 17
1:00 PM PDT

Boxscore

Detroit Pistons 108, Miami Heat 88
Scoring by quarter: 32–15, 20–21, 29–28, 27–24
Pts: Bobi Klintman 20; Rebs: Garrison Brooks 9 Asts: Daniss Jenkins 10	Pts: Myron Gardner 19; Rebs: Oumar Ballo 6 Asts: Kasparas Jakučionis 3

Cox Pavilion, Las Vegas, Nevada
Referees: Cameron Gelinas, Leah Lanie, Joe Prince

ESPN2

July 17
1:30 PM PDT

Boxscore

Indiana Pacers 91, New York Knicks 88
Scoring by quarter: 17–16, 35–22, 16–21, 23–29
Pts: Kam Jones 21; Rebs: Enrique Freeman 10; Asts: Kam Jones 11	Pts: MarJon Beauchamp 28; Rebs: Bayles, Pate, Ware 7 each Asts: Tyler Kolek 5

Thomas & Mack Center, Las Vegas, Nevada
Referees: Julian Scott, Ashley Birch, Kaz Beverley

NBATV

July 17
3:00 PM PDT

Boxscore

Atlanta Hawks 92, Memphis Grizzlies 88
Scoring by quarter: 28–27, 20–19, 27–19, 17–23
Pts: Jack McVeigh 20; Rebs: Asa Newell 8 Asts: Devion Smith 3	Pts: Javon Small 17; Rebs: Hinton, Mashack, Small 5 each Asts: Javon Small 5

Cox Pavilion, Las Vegas, Nevada
Referees: Kenny Gardner, Rachael Rayford, Erica Parker

ESPN

July 17
4:00 PM PDT

Boxscore

San Antonio Spurs 81, Charlotte Hornets 106
Scoring by quarter: 21–22, 13–34, 17–27, 30–23
Pts: Harrison Ingram 17; Rebs: David Jones 9 Asts: David Jones 4	Pts: Knueppel, Simpson 19 each Rebs: PJ Hall 8 Asts: Baugh, Knueppel, Simpson 6 each

Thomas & Mack Center, Las Vegas, Nevada
Referees: Gina Catanzariti, Ashley Gloss, Paulina Gajdosz

NBATV

July 17
5:00 PM PDT

Boxscore

Houston Rockets 83, Portland Trail Blazers 102
Scoring by quarter: 16–21, 24–25, 25–21, 18–35
Pts: Great Osobor 16; Rebs: Kevon Harris 8 Asts: Kennedy Chandler 5	Pts: James Bouknight 25; Rebs: Yang Hansen 8 Asts: Yang Hansen 5

Cox Pavilion, Las Vegas, Nevada
Referees: Nate Cearley, Lars Murray, Ashley Olsen

ESPN

July 17
6:00 PM PDT

Boxscore

Boston Celtics 87, Los Angeles Lakers 78
Scoring by quarter: 21–26, 19–9, 25–20, 22–23
Pts: Jordan Walsh 17; Rebs: Kenneth Lofton Jr. 7 Asts: Baylor Scheierman 6	Pts: Bronny James 18; Rebs: Christian Koloko 6 Asts: James, Steward 5 each

Thomas & Mack Center, Las Vegas, Nevada
Referees: Tyler Mirkovich, Josh Reed, Jessyca Christopher

NBATV

July 17
7:00 PM PDT

Boxscore

Golden State Warriors 69, Toronto Raptors 81
Scoring by quarter: 23–13, 14–23, 16–26, 16—19
Pts: Chris Mañon 14; Rebs: Chris Mañon 9 Asts: Will Richard 4	Pts: Collin Murray-Boyles 20; Rebs: Collin Murray-Boyles 9 Asts: Chucky Hepburn 5

Cox Pavilion, Las Vegas, Nevada
Referees: Biniam Maru, Clare Aubry, Ryo Hasebe

ESPN2

July 17
8:00 PM PDT

Boxscore

Denver Nuggets 81, Los Angeles Clippers 76
Scoring by quarter: 21–11, 25–16, 24—27, 11—22
Pts: DaRon Holmes II 19; Rebs: DaRon Holmes II 17; Asts: DaRon Holmes II 5	Pts: Jordan Miller 23; Rebs: Jordan Miller 14; Asts: Trentyn Flowers 5

Thomas & Mack Center, Las Vegas, Nevada
Referees: Ken Jones, Charles Watson, Jacob Budnik

==== Day 9 ====
NBATV

July 18
1:00 PM PDT

Boxscore

Dallas Mavericks 92, Orlando Magic 69
Scoring by quarter: 20–16, 28–16, 26–18, 18–19
Pts: Maxwell Lewis 18; Rebs: Aliou Diarra 11; Asts: Zhuric Phelps 6	Pts: Wendell Moore Jr. 14; Rebs: Wendell Moore Jr. 8 Asts: Jalen Crutcher 5

Thomas & Mack Center, Las Vegas, Nevada
Referees: Jafar Kinsey, Erik Aellig, Lars Murray

NBATV

July 18
3:00 PM PDT

Boxscore

Philadelphia 76ers 87, Brooklyn Nets 83
Scoring by quarter: 18–28, 25–16, 26–18, 18–21
Pts: Mark Armstrong 23; Rebs: Jalen Slawson 10; Asts: Judah Mintz 4	Pts: Tyrese Samuel 19; Rebs: Tyrese Samuel 12; Asts: Tosan Evbuomwan 4

Thomas & Mack Center, Las Vegas, Nevada
Referees: Catherine Chang, Quincy Smith, Carlos Peralta-Ortega

ESPN+/ESPN3

July 18
4:00 PM PDT

Boxscore

Miami Heat 93, Milwaukee Bucks 92
Scoring by quarter: 29–24, 23–28, 27–21, 14–19
Pts: Vladislav Goldin 18; Rebs: Vladislav Goldin 10; Asts: Javonte Cooke 6	Pts: Tyler Smith 21; Rebs: Malik Williams 10; Asts: Markquis Nowell 5

Cox Pavilion, Las Vegas, Nevada
Referees: Klajdi Mulla, Kaitlynn Versoza, Bobby Bissant

NBATV

July 18
5:00 PM PDT

Boxscore

Utah Jazz 92, Chicago Bulls 105
Scoring by quarter: 12–24, 16–27, 32–25, 32–29
Pts: Cody Williams 26; Rebs: Elijah Harkless 8 Asts: Max Abmas 8	Pts: Javon Freeman-Liberty 22; Rebs: Mãozinha Pereira 11; Asts: Yuki Kawamura 10

Thomas & Mack Center, Las Vegas, Nevada
Referees: Ajay Gonnelli, Ryan Johnson, Jacob Lear

ESPN

July 18
6:00 PM PDT

Boxscore

Indiana Pacers 113, New Orleans Pelicans 104
Scoring by quarter: 27–23, 29–22, 32–22, 25–37
Pts: Robert Baker 26; Rebs: Baker, Freeman 10 each Asts: RayJ Dennis 11	Pts: Jeremiah Fears 22; Rebs: Hunter Dickinson 8 Asts: Trey Alexander 6

Cox Pavilion, Las Vegas, Nevada
Referees: Kastine Evans, J.P. Primm, Austin Spiker

NBATV

July 18
7:00 PM PDT

Boxscore

Denver Nuggets 106, Los Angeles Lakers 84
Scoring by quarter: 25–24, 22–19, 29–26, 30–15
Pts: Curtis Jones 22; Rebs: Ibou Badji 7 Asts: Beekman, Jones 8 each	Pts: Davis, Swider 17 each Rebs: Cole Swider 6 Asts: DJ Steward 4

Thomas & Mack Center, Las Vegas, Nevada
Referees: Julian McFadden, Genesis Perrymond, William McClatchy

==== Day 10 ====
NBATV

July 19
12:30 PM PDT

Boxscore

Washington Wizards 94, New York Knicks 85
Scoring by quarter: 24–22, 16–23, 20–18, 34–22
Pts: Dillon Jones 25; Rebs: Dillon Jones 11; Asts: Keshon Gilbert 5	Pts: Anton Watson 21; Rebs: James Nnaji 11; Asts: Tyler Kolek 4

Cox Pavilion, Las Vegas, Nevada
Referees: Catherine Chang, Julian Scott, Rachael Rayford

ESPN

July 19
1:00 PM PDT

Boxscore

Sacramento Kings 98, Toronto Raptors 88
Scoring by quarter: 28–16, 20–26, 27–18, 23–28
Pts: Isaac Jones 36; Rebs: Maxime Raynaud 7 Asts: Isaiah Stevens 7	Pts: Jamal Shead 24; Rebs: Ulrich Chomche 7 Asts: Jamal Shead 12

Thomas & Mack Center, Las Vegas, Nevada
Referees: Italo Araujo, Gina Catanzariti, Agon Abazi

NBATV

July 19
2:30 PM PDT

Boxscore

Houston Rockets 104, Minnesota Timberwolves 101
Scoring by quarter: 22–31, 26–26, 29–27, 27–17
Pts: Kennedy Chandler 20; Rebs: Mylik Wilson 8 Asts: Chandler, Harris 6 each	Pts: Tristen Newton 24; Rebs: Jesse Edwards 8 Asts: Tristen Newton 10

Cox Pavilion, Las Vegas, Nevada
Referees: Tyler Mirkovich, Leah Lanie, Tommy Wu

ESPN

July 19
3:00 PM PDT

Boxscore

Charlotte Hornets 109, Oklahoma City Thunder 80
Scoring by quarter: 23–16, 29–17, 35–29, 22–18
Pts: Jaylen Sims 25; Rebs: KJ Simpson 10; Asts: Damion Baugh 9	Pts: Erik Reynolds II 16; Rebs: Branden Carlson 7 Asts: Chris Youngblood 3

Thomas & Mack Center, Las Vegas, Nevada
Referees: Biniam Manu, Marcy Williams, Cameron Garber

NBATV

July 19
4:30 PM PDT

Boxscore

Cleveland Cavaliers 71, Golden State Warriors 82
Scoring by quarter: 12–16, 23–23, 9–25, 27–18
Pts: Nae'Qwan Tomlin 17; Rebs: Norchad Omier 10; Asts: Darius Brown 5	Pts: Chris Mañon 17; Rebs: Ja'Vier Francis 7 Asts: Bez Mbeng 3

Cox Pavilion, Las Vegas, Nevada
Referees: Nate Cearley, Ryo Hasebe, Jessyca Christopher

ESPN+/ESPN3

July 19
5:00 PM PDT

Boxscore

Detroit Pistons 84, San Antonio Spurs 96
Scoring by quarter: 19–19, 23–34, 21–21, 21–22
Pts: John Ukomadu 12; Rebs: Keels, Smith, Williams 4 each Asts: Zakai Zeigler 5	Pts: David Jones 23; Rebs: Jones, Osifo 6 each Asts: Carter, Ingram, Jones 3 each

Thomas & Mack Center, Las Vegas, Nevada
Referees: Ian McClenny, Kaz Beverley, Paulina Gajdosz

NBATV

July 19
6:30 PM PDT

Boxscore

Portland Trail Blazers 87, Phoenix Suns 111
Scoring by quarter: 25–19, 14–30, 22–28
Pts: Rayan Rupert 14; Rebs: Rayan Rupert 8 Asts: Cissoko, Rupert, Skapintsev 4 each	Pts: Khalif Battle 21; Rebs: C. J. Huntley 9 Asts: Ellis, Schumacher 6 each

Cox Pavilion, Las Vegas, Nevada
Referees: Ashley Gloss, M.P. Malo, Evan Singletary

==== Day 11 ====
ESPNU

July 20
3:00 PM PDT

Boxscore

Atlanta Hawks 80, Boston Celtics 101
Scoring by quarter: 20–27, 19–21, 11–23, 30–30
Pts: Kobe Johnson 14; Rebs: Nelly Joseph 9 Asts: Dwight Murray Jr. 6	Pts: Isaiah Wong 18; Rebs: Aaron Scott 9 Asts: Isaiah Wong 6

Thomas & Mack Center, Las Vegas, Nevada
Referees: Cameron Gelinas, Ryan Johnson, Ashley Birch

ESPNU

July 20
5:00 PM PDT

Boxscore

Memphis Grizzlies 105, Los Angeles Clippers 82
Scoring by quarter: 22–23, 33–11, 25–19, 25–29
Pts: Tyler Burton 20; Rebs: Will Magnay 8 Asts: Javon Small 9	Pts: Jordan Miller 24; Rebs: John Poulakidas 7 Asts: Trentyn Flowers 3

Thomas & Mack Center, Las Vegas, Nevada
Referees: Julian McFadden, Jason Alabanza, Kastine Evans

ESPN

July 20
7:00 PM PDT

Boxscore

Sacramento Kings 78, Charlotte Hornets 83
Scoring by quarter: 18–34, 21–12, 17–21, 22–16
Pts: Isaac Jones 24; Rebs: Isaac Jones 11; Asts: Devin Carter 7	Pts: Kon Knueppel 21; Rebs: Kalkbrenner, Oduro 9 each Asts: KJ Simpson 5

Thomas & Mack Center, Las Vegas, Nevada
Referees: Pat O'Connell, Brent Haskill, CP Painter
