= DJ Rodman =

American basketball player (born 2001)

No. 10 – Long Island Nets
- Position: Small forward
- League: NBA G League

Personal information
- Born: April 25, 2001 (age 25) Newport Beach, California, U.S.
- Listed height: 6 ft 6 in (1.98 m)
- Listed weight: 215 lb (98 kg)

Career information
- High school: Corona del Mar (Newport Beach, California); JSerra Catholic (San Juan Capistrano, California)
- College: Washington State (2019–2023); USC (2023–2024)
- NBA draft: 2024: undrafted
- Playing career: 2024–present

Career history
- 2024: Capital City Go-Go
- 2025: Maine Celtics
- 2025–2026: Greensboro Swarm
- 2026–present: Long Island Nets

Career highlights
- NBA G League champion (2026)
- Stats at NBA.com
- Stats at Basketball Reference

Dennis Thayne "DJ" Rodman (born April 25, 2001) is an American professional basketball player for the Long Island Nets of the NBA G League. He played college basketball for the Washington State Cougars and the USC Trojans. He is the son of Hall of Fame basketball player Dennis Rodman.

== Early life ==
Dennis Thayne "DJ" Rodman was born on April 25, 2001, in Newport Beach, California. Rodman attended Kaiser Elementary and Page Private School in Costa Mesa, California, and Ensign Intermediate School in Newport Beach. As a high school freshman, Rodman played basketball for Corona del Mar High School in Newport Beach, California. In his sophomore season, he averaged 19.6 points per game and led his team to a 22–8 record. After the season, Rodman transferred to JSerra Catholic High School in San Juan Capistrano, California. As a junior, he averaged 16.1 points and 6.1 rebounds per game. In his senior season, he averaged 24.2 points per game and 8.9 rebounds per game. In May 2019, Rodman committed to playing college basketball for Washington State.

== College career ==
Rodman initially received sparse playing time during his freshman season, but his minutes increased after Tony Miller's ankle injury. On January 16, 2020, Rodman scored a season-high eight points along with five rebounds in a win over Oregon. In his freshman season at Washington State, Rodman averaged 1.7 points and 1.9 rebounds in 11.9 minutes per game through 26 appearances. The season was cut short due to the COVID-19 pandemic. Rodman missed eight games due to an injury during his sophomore season. He averaged 6.1 points and 3.7 rebounds per game. As a junior, Rodman averaged 4.2 points and 4.1 rebounds per game.

Rodman averaged 9.6 points and 5.8 rebounds per game as a senior. On May 10, 2023, Rodman announced his transfer to play for the USC Trojans for his final season of college eligibility. He averaged 8.4 points, 5.0 rebounds, and 1.3 assists per game in his final season.

== Professional career ==
After going undrafted in the 2024 NBA draft, Rodman joined the Los Angeles Clippers for the 2024 NBA Summer League and on October 26, 2024, he joined the Capital City Go-Go of the NBA G League after being selected with the 43rd overall pick in the G League draft. However, he was waived on November 25 only to be re-signed four days later. However, he was waived once again on December 3.

On January 3, 2025, Rodman joined the Maine Celtics. However, Rodman was waived by the team on January 9 and re-signed two days later.

Rodman joined the Charlotte Hornets for the 2025 NBA Summer League but was waived on September 23, 2025.

On September 21, 2026, Rodman signed with the Brooklyn Nets, but was waived by the team the same day.

== Career statistics ==
Legend
GP	Games played	GS	Games started	MPG	Minutes per game
FG%	Field goal percentage	3P%	3-point field goal percentage	FT%	Free throw percentage
RPG	Rebounds per game	APG	Assists per game	SPG	Steals per game
BPG	Blocks per game	PPG	Points per game	**Bold**	Career high

=== College ===
Year	Team	GP	GS	MPG	FG%	3P%	FT%	RPG	APG	SPG	BPG	PPG
2019–20	Washington State	26	0	11.9	.275	.286	.600	1.9	.3	.2	.0	1.7
2020–21	Washington State	19	10	23.4	.402	**.411**	.750	3.7	.9	.4	.1	6.1
2021–22	Washington State	**35**	2	19.4	.420	.279	**.806**	4.1	.9	.4	.2	4.2
2022–23	Washington State	31	**30**	**31.5**	.413	.381	.792	**5.8**	**1.4**	**.7**	.3	**9.6**
2023–24	USC	32	28	27.5	**.440**	.362	.738	5.0	1.3	**.7**	**.5**	8.4
Career		143	70	23.0	.411	.354	.764	4.2	1.0	.5	.2	6.1

== Personal life ==
Rodman is the son of Dennis Rodman and Michelle Moyer. His sister is Olympic gold medalist and professional soccer player Trinity Rodman, who plays for the Washington Spirit and the US women's national team.

Rodman had his first asthma attack in third grade and was able to grow out of it.
