= 2024–25 Utah Jazz season =

- Head coach: Will Hardy
- General manager: Justin Zanik
- Owner: Ryan Smith
- Arena: Delta Center

Results
- Record: 17–65 (.207)
- Place: Division: 5th (Northwest); Conference: 15th (Western)
- Playoff finish: Did not qualify
- Stats at Basketball Reference

Local media
- Television: KJZZ-TV; KUTV; Kiswe (Jazz+); Root Sports Northwest
- Radio: 1280; 97.5 The Zone

The 2024–25 Utah Jazz season was the 51st season for the franchise in the National Basketball Association (NBA), and their 46th season in Salt Lake City, Utah. In June 2024, the Jazz revealed that the 2024–25 season's jersey lineup would feature two new designs alongside two existing uniforms, as part of the new "Mountain Basketball" brand philosophy. The new designs were met with positive reviews, particularly for their emphasis of the purple mountain design from previous eras. By the end of October, the Jazz would be the last team in the NBA to win a game for this season.

On March 10, 2025, the Jazz were eliminated from playoff contention for the 3rd year in a row following their loss to the Boston Celtics. By the end of March, the Jazz officially recorded their 60th loss of the season to the Charlotte Hornets, which not only makes this season currently the worst season in franchise history, but it also ends the Jazz's record of being the only NBA team remaining to not lose 60 or more games in a season. They also failed to improve upon their 31–51 record from the previous year, and finished with the worst record in the conference and the league at 17–65. The Jazz allowed 9,941 total points (121.2 points per game), the tenth most points allowed by an NBA team in a season.

The Utah Jazz drew an average home attendance of 18,174, the 14th-highest of all NBA teams.

== Draft ==
Round	Pick	Player	Position	Nationality	College
1	10	Cody Williams	SG	United States	Colorado
1	29	Isaiah Collier	PG	United States	USC
2	32	Kyle Filipowski	C	United States	Duke

The Jazz had two first-round picks and one second-round pick entering the draft. They kept their original first-round pick which landed 10th following the NBA draft lottery, while the two other picks were acquired through previous trades. The team's original second-round pick was conveyed to the New York Knicks as the more favorable pick after Utah finished with a worse record than the Cleveland Cavaliers in the previous season.

On the first night, the Jazz selected two freshmen in Cody Williams and Isaiah Collier with the 10th and 29th picks respectively. Both were regarded as needing development, with commentators regarding Williams as lacking strength and Collier having turnover issues, and general manager Justin Zanik referring to the upcoming roster as a "young, developmental squad" in a post-draft interview. On the second night, the Jazz drafted Kyle Filipowski. Filipowski was previously invited to the green room on the first night as an expected first round selection, but was not chosen that day. On the morning of the second round, draft analyst Jonathan Givony reported that the draft slide was due to teams concerned about his relationship with his fiancé, claiming that he was "estranged from his family because of this whole situation", and that she was "much older than him". When asked about the rumors, a Jazz front office member stated they had done a background check and were excited to select Filipowski.

== Roster ==
2024–25 Utah Jazz roster
Players

Pos.	No.	Player	Height	Weight	DOB	From
G	00	Jordan Clarkson	6 ft 3 in (1.91 m)	194 lb (88 kg)	1992-06-07	Missouri
G	13	Isaiah Collier	6 ft 3 in (1.91 m)	210 lb (95 kg)	2004-10-08	USC
F	20	John Collins	6 ft 9 in (2.06 m)	226 lb (103 kg)	1997-09-23	Wake Forest
C	22	Kyle Filipowski	6 ft 11 in (2.11 m)	250 lb (113 kg)	2003-10-07	Duke
G	3	Keyonte George	6 ft 4 in (1.93 m)	185 lb (84 kg)	2003-11-08	Baylor
G	16	Elijah Harkless (TW)	6 ft 3 in (1.91 m)	195 lb (88 kg)	2000-02-03	UNLV
F	0	Taylor Hendricks	6 ft 9 in (2.06 m)	215 lb (98 kg)	2003-11-22	Central Florida
G	33	Johnny Juzang	6 ft 5 in (1.96 m)	209 lb (95 kg)	2001-03-17	UCLA
C	24	Walker Kessler	7 ft 0 in (2.13 m)	245 lb (111 kg)	2001-07-26	Auburn
F	23	Lauri Markkanen	7 ft 0 in (2.13 m)	240 lb (109 kg)	1997-05-22	Arizona
F	99	Kenyon Martin Jr.	6 ft 6 in (1.98 m)	215 lb (98 kg)	2001-01-06	IMG Academy (FL)
G/F	19	Sviatoslav Mykhailiuk	6 ft 7 in (2.01 m)	205 lb (93 kg)	1997-06-10	Kansas
C	25	Micah Potter (TW)	6 ft 9 in (2.06 m)	248 lb (112 kg)	1998-04-06	Wisconsin
F	28	Brice Sensabaugh	6 ft 5 in (1.96 m)	235 lb (107 kg)	2003-10-30	Ohio State
G	2	Collin Sexton	6 ft 3 in (1.91 m)	190 lb (86 kg)	1999-01-04	Alabama
G	11	Jaden Springer	6 ft 4 in (1.93 m)	202 lb (92 kg)	2002-09-25	Tennessee
C	34	Oscar Tshiebwe (TW)	6 ft 8 in (2.03 m)	255 lb (116 kg)	1999-11-27	Kentucky
F	5	Cody Williams	6 ft 7 in (2.01 m)	190 lb (86 kg)	2004-11-20	Colorado

Coaches
Head coach
- Will Hardy
Assistant(s)
- Evan Bradds
- Rick Higgins
- Chris Jones
- Scott Morrison
- Sean Sheldon
- Jason Terry
- Mike Williams

Legend
- (DP) Unsigned draft pick
- (FA) Free agent
- (S) Suspended
- (GL) On assignment to G League affiliate
- (TW) Two-way affiliate player
- Injured

Roster
Updated: February 2, 2025

== Standings ==
=== Division ===
Northwest Division	W	L	PCT	GB	Home	Road	Div	GP
z – Oklahoma City Thunder	68	14	.829	–	36‍–‍6	32‍–‍8	12‍–‍4	82
x – Denver Nuggets	50	32	.610	18.0	26‍–‍15	24‍–‍17	8‍–‍8	82
x – Minnesota Timberwolves	49	33	.598	19.0	25‍–‍16	24‍–‍17	11‍–‍5	82
Portland Trail Blazers	36	46	.439	32.0	22‍–‍19	14‍–‍27	6‍–‍10	82
Utah Jazz	17	65	.207	51.0	10‍–‍31	7‍–‍34	3‍–‍13	82

=== Conference ===
Western Conference
#	Team	W	L	PCT	GB	GP
1	z – Oklahoma City Thunder *	68	14	.829	–	82
2	y – Houston Rockets *	52	30	.634	16.0	82
3	y – Los Angeles Lakers *	50	32	.610	18.0	82
4	x – Denver Nuggets	50	32	.610	18.0	82
5	x – Los Angeles Clippers	50	32	.610	18.0	82
6	x – Minnesota Timberwolves	49	33	.598	19.0	82
7	x – Golden State Warriors	48	34	.585	20.0	82
8	x – Memphis Grizzlies	48	34	.585	20.0	82
9	pi – Sacramento Kings	40	42	.488	28.0	82
10	pi – Dallas Mavericks	39	43	.476	29.0	82
11	Phoenix Suns	36	46	.439	32.0	82
12	Portland Trail Blazers	36	46	.439	32.0	82
13	San Antonio Spurs	34	48	.415	34.0	82
14	New Orleans Pelicans	21	61	.256	47.0	82
15	Utah Jazz	17	65	.207	51.0	82

== Game log ==
=== Preseason ===
2024 preseason game log
Total: 4–2 (Home: 3–0; Road: 1–2)
Preseason: 4–2 (home: 3–0; road: 1–2)

Game	Date	Team	Score	High points	High rebounds	High assists	Location Attendance	Record
1	October 4	New Zealand	W 116–87	Johnny Juzang (19)	Walker Kessler (9)	Isaiah Collier (6)	Delta Center; 14,121	1–0
2	October 7	Houston	W 122–113	Lauri Markkanen (17)	Collins, Sensabaugh (7)	Collins, George (4)	Delta Center; 14,288	2–0
3	October 10	@ Dallas	W 107–102	Lauri Markkanen (26)	Walker Kessler (15)	Isaiah Collier (7)	American Airlines Center; 19,210	3–0
4	October 12	@ San Antonio	L 120–126	Collin Sexton (24)	Walker Kessler (9)	Collin Sexton (8)	Frost Bank Center; 17,635	3–1
5	October 15	Sacramento	W 117–114	Keyonte George (24)	Walker Kessler (9)	Collin Sexton (6)	Delta Center; 14,976	4–1
6	October 18	@ Portland	L 86–124	Brice Sensabaugh (13)	Walker Kessler (6)	Kyle Filipowski (4)	Moda Center; 15,806	4–2

2024–25 preseason schedule

=== Regular season ===
2024–25 game log
Total: 17–65 (Home: 10–31; Road: 7–34)
October: 0–5 (home: 0–4; road: 0–1)

Game	Date	Team	Score	High points	High rebounds	High assists	Location Attendance	Record
1	October 23	Memphis	L 124–126	Lauri Markkanen (35)	Walker Kessler (14)	Clarkson, George (7)	Delta Center; 18,175	0–1
2	October 25	Golden State	L 86–127	John Collins (14)	Walker Kessler (9)	John Collins (4)	Delta Center; 18,175	0–2
3	October 28	@ Dallas	L 102–110	Collin Sexton (23)	Walker Kessler (11)	Keyonte George (5)	American Airlines Center; 19,811	0–3
4	October 29	Sacramento	L 96–113	Jordan Clarkson (21)	Filipowski, Kessler (8)	Keyonte George (11)	Delta Center; 18,175	0–4
5	October 31	San Antonio	L 88–106	Collin Sexton (16)	Collins, Kessler (11)	Keyonte George (5)	Delta Center; 18,175	0–5

November: 4–10 (home: 2–4; road: 2–6)

Game	Date	Team	Score	High points	High rebounds	High assists	Location Attendance	Record
6	November 2	@ Denver	L 103–129	Walker Kessler (18)	Walker Kessler (14)	Keyonte George (8)	Ball Arena; 19,702	0–6
7	November 4	@ Chicago	W 135–126	Keyonte George (33)	Walker Kessler (16)	Keyonte George (9)	United Center; 19,621	1–6
8	November 7	@ Milwaukee	L 100–123	Jordan Clarkson (18)	Walker Kessler (8)	Collin Sexton (7)	Fiserv Forum; 17,341	1–7
9	November 9	@ San Antonio	W 111–110	Collin Sexton (23)	John Collins (10)	Kyle Filipowski (6)	Frost Bank Center; 18,354	2–7
10	November 12	Phoenix	L 112–120	John Collins (29)	John Collins (10)	Jordan Clarkson (8)	Delta Center; 18,175	2–8
11	November 14	Dallas	W 115–113	John Collins (28)	John Collins (9)	Keyonte George (6)	Delta Center; 18,175	3–8
12	November 16	@ Sacramento	L 117–121	Lauri Markkanen (25)	John Collins (8)	Jordan Clarkson (5)	Golden 1 Center; 16,568	3–9
13	November 17	@ L.A. Clippers	L 105–116	Jordan Clarkson (21)	Lauri Markkanen (10)	Isaiah Collier (8)	Intuit Dome; 15,500	3–10
14	November 19	@ L.A. Lakers	L 118–124	Lauri Markkanen (25)	Collins, Eubanks, Markkanen (8)	Filipowski, George (6)	Crypto.com Arena; 18,997	3–11
15	November 21	@ San Antonio	L 118–126	Lauri Markkanen (27)	John Collins (14)	Isaiah Collier (6)	Frost Bank Center; 17,087	3–12
16	November 23	New York	W 121–106	Lauri Markkanen (34)	John Collins (13)	Keyonte George (9)	Delta Center; 18,175	4–12
17	November 26	San Antonio	L 115–128	Keyonte George (26)	John Collins (13)	Keyonte George (7)	Delta Center; 18,175	4–13
18	November 27	Denver	L 103–122	Collin Sexton (26)	Micah Potter (16)	Walker Kessler (5)	Delta Center; 18,175	4–14
19	November 30	Dallas	L 94–106	Lauri Markkanen (19)	Walker Kessler (10)	Keyonte George (8)	Delta Center; 18,175	4–15

December: 3–9 (home: 0–4; road: 3–5)

Game	Date	Team	Score	High points	High rebounds	High assists	Location Attendance	Record
20	December 1	L.A. Lakers	L 104–105	Lauri Markkanen (22)	Walker Kessler (11)	Johnny Juzang (5)	Delta Center; 18,175	4–16
21	December 3	@ Oklahoma City	L 106–133	Kessler, Sexton (17)	Walker Kessler (11)	Keyonte George (5)	Paycom Center; 17,711	4–17
22	December 6	@ Portland	W 141–99	Johnny Juzang (22)	Walker Kessler (17)	Collier, Sexton (7)	Moda Center; 16,446	5–17
23	December 8	@ Sacramento	L 97–141	Keyonte George (25)	Walker Kessler (14)	Keyonte George (6)	Golden 1 Center; 15,706	5–18
24	December 13	Phoenix	L 126–134	Jordan Clarkson (23)	Collins, George, Markkanen (6)	Keyonte George (9)	Delta Center; 18,175	5–19
25	December 16	@ L.A. Clippers	L 107–144	Jordan Clarkson (20)	Walker Kessler (7)	Keyonte George (7)	Intuit Dome; 14,651	5–20
26	December 19	@ Detroit	W 126–119	Collin Sexton (30)	Lauri Markkanen (14)	Collin Sexton (7)	Little Caesars Arena; 18,022	6–20
27	December 21	@ Brooklyn	W 105–94	Lauri Markkanen (21)	John Collins (11)	Jordan Clarkson (8)	Barclays Center; 17,926	7–20
28	December 23	@ Cleveland	L 113–124	Jordan Clarkson (27)	Walker Kessler (16)	Clarkson, Sexton (5)	Rocket Mortgage FieldHouse; 19,432	7–21
29	December 26	@ Portland	L 120–122	Lauri Markkanen (25)	Walker Kessler (16)	Collin Sexton (11)	Moda Center; 16,934	7–22
30	December 28	Philadelphia	L 111–114	Lauri Markkanen (23)	Walker Kessler (11)	Collin Sexton (8)	Delta Center; 18,175	7–23
31	December 30	Denver	L 121–132	Jordan Clarkson (24)	Walker Kessler (13)	Keyonte George (6)	Delta Center; 18,175	7–24

January: 3–12 (home: 1–5; road: 2–7)

Game	Date	Team	Score	High points	High rebounds	High assists	Location Attendance	Record
32	January 1	@ New York	L 103–119	Clarkson, Sexton (25)	Lauri Markkanen (10)	Keyonte George (6)	Madison Square Garden; 19,812	7–25
33	January 4	@ Miami	W 136–100	Brice Sensabaugh (34)	Walker Kessler (16)	Collin Sexton (8)	Kaseya Center; 19,934	8–25
34	January 5	@ Orlando	W 105–92	Brice Sensabaugh (27)	Walker Kessler (17)	Isaiah Collier (6)	Kia Center; 19,198	9–25
35	January 7	Atlanta	L 121–124	Lauri Markkanen (35)	Walker Kessler (10)	Isaiah Collier (9)	Delta Center; 18,175	9–26
36	January 9	Miami	L 92–97	Markkanen, Sexton (23)	Walker Kessler (15)	Isaiah Collier (9)	Delta Center; 18,175	9–27
37	January 11	@ Phoenix	L 106–114	Lauri Markkanen (24)	Walker Kessler (13)	Isaiah Collier (8)	Footprint Center; 17,071	9–28
38	January 12	Brooklyn	W 112–111 (OT)	Isaiah Collier (23)	Drew Eubanks (9)	Isaiah Collier (7)	Delta Center; 18,175	10–28
39	January 15	Charlotte	L 112–117	Keyonte George (26)	Eubanks, Kessler (8)	Isaiah Collier (10)	Delta Center; 18,175	10–29
40	January 17	@ New Orleans	L 123–136	Keyonte George (26)	Collier, Eubanks (7)	Isaiah Collier (11)	Smoothie King Center; 18,321	10–30
41	January 20	@ New Orleans	L 119–123 (OT)	Keyonte George (23)	Kyle Filipowski (17)	Isaiah Collier (11)	Smoothie King Center; 14,830	10–31
42	January 22	@ Oklahoma City	L 114–123	John Collins (22)	Walker Kessler (15)	Keyonte George (10)	Paycom Center; 17,509	10–32
43	January 25	@ Memphis	L 103–125	Collin Sexton (20)	Walker Kessler (10)	Isaiah Collier (8)	FedExForum; 17,011	10–33
44	January 27	Milwaukee	L 110–125	Markkanen, Sexton (19)	Drew Eubanks (10)	Isaiah Collier (8)	Delta Center; 18,175	10–34
45	January 28	@ Golden State	L 103–114	Collin Sexton (30)	Micah Potter (7)	Isaiah Collier (9)	Chase Center; 18,064	10–35
46	January 30	Minnesota	L 113–138	Keyonte George (23)	Walker Kessler (8)	Isaiah Collier (7)	Delta Center; 18,175	10–36

February: 5–8 (home: 5–5; road: 0–3)

Game	Date	Team	Score	High points	High rebounds	High assists	Location Attendance	Record
47	February 1	Orlando	W 113–99	Collin Sexton (22)	Walker Kessler (15)	Collin Sexton (8)	Delta Center; 18,175	11–36
48	February 3	Indiana	L 111–112	Clarkson, Collins (21)	Walker Kessler (13)	Keyonte George (11)	Delta Center; 18,175	11–37
49	February 5	Golden State	W 131–128	Jordan Clarkson (31)	Walker Kessler (18)	Isaiah Collier (11)	Delta Center; 18,175	12–37
50	February 7	@ Phoenix	L 127–135 (OT)	John Collins (21)	Walker Kessler (22)	Isaiah Collier (13)	Footprint Center; 17,071	12–38
51	February 8	@ L.A. Clippers	L 110–130	Jordan Clarkson (24)	Kyle Filipowski (8)	Isaiah Collier (9)	Intuit Dome; 15,892	12–39
52	February 10	@ L.A. Lakers	L 113–132	Collins, Markkanen (17)	Walker Kessler (12)	Isaiah Collier (10)	Crypto.com Arena; 18,997	12–40
53	February 12	L.A. Lakers	W 131–119	Lauri Markkanen (32)	Jordan Clarkson (9)	Keyonte George (10)	Delta Center; 18,175	13–40
54	February 13	L.A. Clippers	L 116–120 (OT)	Filipowski, Markkanen (20)	Kyle Filipowski (10)	Keyonte George (9)	Delta Center; 18,175	13–41
All-Star Game
55	February 21	Oklahoma City	L 107–130	John Collins (26)	Walker Kessler (19)	Isaiah Collier (12)	Delta Center; 18,175	13–42
56	February 22	Houston	W 124–115	Keyonte George (30)	Walker Kessler (17)	Isaiah Collier (10)	Delta Center; 18,175	14–42
57	February 24	Portland	L 112–114	George, Sensabaugh (21)	Kyle Filipowski (11)	Filipowski, George, Williams (5)	Delta Center; 18,175	14–43
58	February 26	Sacramento	L 101–118	Walker Kessler (25)	Walker Kessler (14)	Isaiah Collier (7)	Delta Center; 18,175	14–44
59	February 28	Minnesota	W 117–116	John Collins (29)	Filipowski, Kessler (13)	Isaiah Collier (14)	Delta Center; 18,175	15–44

March: 1–15 (home: 1–8; road: 0–7)

Game	Date	Team	Score	High points	High rebounds	High assists	Location Attendance	Record
60	March 2	New Orleans	L 121–128	Keyonte George (28)	Oscar Tshiebwe (13)	Isaiah Collier (8)	Delta Center; 18,175	15–45
61	March 3	Detroit	L 106–134	Kyle Filipowski (25)	Walker Kessler (9)	Sviatoslav Mykhailiuk (4)	Delta Center; 18,175	15–46
62	March 5	@ Washington	L 122–125	Johnny Juzang (27)	Filipowski, Tshiebwe (13)	Collier, Mykhailiuk (6)	Capital One Arena; 14,761	15–47
63	March 7	@ Toronto	L 109–118	George, Kessler (18)	Walker Kessler (25)	Keyonte George (8)	Scotiabank Arena; 18,258	15–48
64	March 9	@ Philadelphia	L 122–126	Filipowski, George (25)	Filipowski, Juzang, Martin (7)	Isaiah Collier (10)	Wells Fargo Center; 19,757	15–49
65	March 10	@ Boston	L 108–114	John Collins (28)	Collins, Kessler (10)	Collin Sexton (13)	TD Garden; 19,156	15–50
66	March 12	@ Memphis	L 115–122	Collins, Sexton (22)	Walker Kessler (14)	Collin Sexton (7)	FedExForum; 16,232	15–51
67	March 14	Toronto	L 118–126	Jordan Clarkson (19)	Kyle Filipowski (11)	Isaiah Collier (8)	Delta Center; 18,175	15–52
68	March 16	@ Minnesota	L 102–128	Collin Sexton (22)	Walker Kessler (19)	Isaiah Collier (6)	Target Center; 18,978	15–53
69	March 17	Chicago	L 97–111	George, Markkanen (16)	Walker Kessler (12)	Isaiah Collier (8)	Delta Center; 18,175	15–54
70	March 19	Washington	W 128–112	Kyle Filipowski (21)	Oscar Tshiebwe (10)	Isaiah Collier (6)	Delta Center; 18,175	16–54
71	March 21	Boston	L 99–121	Collin Sexton (30)	Walker Kessler (11)	Keyonte George (7)	Delta Center; 18,175	16–55
72	March 23	Cleveland	L 91–120	Kyle Filipowski (18)	Filipowski, Kessler (13)	Keyonte George (7)	Delta Center; 18,175	16–56
73	March 25	Memphis	L 103–140	Isaiah Collier (21)	Walker Kessler (9)	Juzang, Sensabaugh, Sexton (5)	Delta Center; 18,175	16–57
74	March 27	Houston	L 110–121	Collin Sexton (21)	Walker Kessler (9)	Keyonte George (8)	Delta Center; 18,175	16–58
75	March 28	@ Denver	L 93–129	Collin Sexton (20)	Kyle Filipowski (13)	Isaiah Collier (7)	Ball Arena; 19,905	16–59
76	March 31	@ Charlotte	L 106–110	Keyonte George (20)	Kyle Filipowski (13)	Isaiah Collier (7)	Spectrum Center; 14,410	16–60

April: 1–5 (home: 1–1; road: 0–4)

Game	Date	Team	Score	High points	High rebounds	High assists	Location Attendance	Record
77	April 2	@ Houston	L 105–143	Isaiah Collier (22)	Walker Kessler (12)	Isaiah Collier (10)	Toyota Center; 18,055	16–61
78	April 4	@ Indiana	L 112–140	Collin Sexton (27)	Brice Sensabaugh (10)	Collier, George (5)	Gainbridge Fieldhouse; 17,274	16–62
79	April 6	@ Atlanta	L 134–147	Keyonte George (35)	Kyle Filipowski (9)	Isaiah Collier (12)	State Farm Arena; 16,331	16–63
80	April 9	Portland	W 133–126 (OT)	Kyle Filipowski (30)	Kyle Filipowski (18)	Keyonte George (6)	Delta Center; 18,175	17–63
81	April 11	Oklahoma City	L 111–145	Sviatoslav Mykhailiuk (27)	Oscar Tshiebwe (14)	Keyonte George (8)	Delta Center; 18,175	17–64
82	April 13	@ Minnesota	L 105–116	Brice Sensabaugh (22)	Oscar Tshiebwe (12)	Keyonte George (7)	Target Center; 18,978	17–65

2024–25 season schedule

=== NBA Cup ===
The groups were revealed during the tournament announcement on July 12, 2024.

==== West Group B ====
Pos	Team	Pld	W	L	PF	PA	PD	Qualification
1	Oklahoma City Thunder	4	3	1	437	392	+45	Advance to knockout stage
2	Phoenix Suns	4	3	1	434	404	+30	
3	Los Angeles Lakers	4	2	2	437	461	−24	
4	San Antonio Spurs	4	2	2	446	443	+3	
5	Utah Jazz	4	0	4	451	505	−54	

Source: NBA
Rules for classification: Tiebreakers

== Player statistics ==
Legend
GP	Games played	GS	Games started	MPG	Minutes per game
FG%	Field-goal percentage	3P%	3-point field-goal percentage	FT%	Free-throw percentage
RPG	Rebounds per game	APG	Assists per game	SPG	Steals per game
BPG	Blocks per game	PPG	Points per game

=== Regular season ===
Utah Jazz statistics
Player	GP	GS	MPG	FG%	3P%	FT%	RPG	APG	SPG	BPG	PPG
Jordan Clarkson	37	9	26.0	.408	.362	.797	3.2	3.7	.8	.2	16.2
Isaiah Collier	71	46	25.9	.422	.249	.682	3.3	6.3	.9	.2	8.7
John Collins	40	31	30.5	.527	.399	.848	8.2	2.0	1.0	1.0	19.0
Drew Eubanks^{†}	37	4	15.4	.607	.600	.632	4.5	1.2	.3	.9	5.8
Kyle Filipowski	72	27	21.1	.502	.350	.650	6.1	1.9	.7	.3	9.6
Keyonte George	67	35	31.5	.391	.343	.818	3.8	5.6	.7	.1	16.8
Elijah Harkless	10	0	13.8	.314	.280	.500	2.1	.8	1.0	.1	3.2
Taylor Hendricks	3	3	25.0	.222	.250	.750	5.0	.7	1.7	1.3	4.7
Johnny Juzang	64	18	19.8	.429	.376	.849	2.9	1.1	.6	.1	8.9
Walker Kessler	58	58	30.0	.663	.176	.520	12.2	1.7	.6	2.4	11.1
Lauri Markkanen	47	47	31.4	.423	.346	.876	5.9	1.5	.7	.4	19.0
KJ Martin^{†}	19	9	22.7	.490	.189	.722	2.8	1.5	.3	.3	6.3
Patty Mills^{†}	17	0	15.3	.342	.298	1.000	1.2	1.2	.7	.2	4.4
Svi Mykhailiuk	38	13	20.0	.391	.345	.800	2.4	2.0	.5	.2	8.8
Micah Potter	38	10	18.6	.422	.316	.850	4.3	.8	.4	.4	4.3
Brice Sensabaugh	71	15	20.2	.459	.422	.890	3.0	1.5	.6	.1	10.9
Collin Sexton	63	61	27.9	.480	.406	.865	2.7	4.2	.7	.1	18.4
Jaden Springer^{†}	17	2	13.2	.411	.207	.706	2.0	1.4	.7	.2	3.8
Oscar Tshiebwe	14	1	18.2	.600		.742	8.7	.6	.9	.1	7.6
Cody Williams	50	21	21.2	.323	.259	.725	2.3	1.2	.5	.3	4.6

- ^{†} Denotes player spent time with another team in the season. Stats reflect time with the Jazz only.

== Transactions ==
=== Trades ===
July 18, 2024	To Utah Jazz Russell Westbrook; 2030 second-round pick swap right Draft rights to Balša Koprivica; Cash considerations	To Los Angeles Clippers Kris Dunn (sign-and-trade)
January 21, 2025	To Utah Jazz 2031 first-round pick	To Phoenix Suns 2025 first-round pick (from Cleveland via Utah); 2027 first-round pick 2029 first-round pick
February 1, 2025	To Los Angeles Clippers Drew Eubanks; Patty Mills	To Utah Jazz Mo Bamba; P. J. Tucker; 2030 L.A. Clippers second-round pick Cash considerations
February 2, 2025	Three-team trade
February 2, 2025	To Utah Jazz Jalen Hood-Schifino (from L.A. Lakers); 2025 second-round pick (from Dallas); 2025 L.A. Clippers second-round pick (from L.A. Lakers)	To Los Angeles Lakers Luka Dončić (from Dallas); Maxi Kleber (from Dallas); Markieff Morris (from Dallas)
February 2, 2025	To Dallas Mavericks Anthony Davis (from L.A. Lakers); Max Christie (from L.A. Lakers); 2029 L.A. Lakers first-round pick
February 6, 2025	Five-team trade
February 6, 2025	To Golden State Warriors Jimmy Butler (from Miami); Two second-round picks (from Miami); Cash considerations (from Miami)	To Detroit Pistons Dennis Schröder (from Utah via Golden State); Lindy Waters III (from Golden State); 2031 second-round pick (from Golden State)
February 6, 2025	To Miami Heat Kyle Anderson (from Golden State); Davion Mitchell (from Toronto); Andrew Wiggins (from Golden State); 2025 protected first-round pick (from Golden State)	To Toronto Raptors P. J. Tucker (from Utah); 2026 second-round pick (from Miami); Cash considerations (from Miami)
February 6, 2025	To Utah Jazz Kenyon Martin Jr. (from Detroit via Philadelphia); Josh Richardson (from Miami); 2028 second-round pick (from Detroit via Philadelphia); 2031 second-round pick (from Miami); Cash considerations (from Miami)

=== Free agency ===
==== Additions ====
Date	Player	Former Team	Ref.
July 5	Taevion Kinsey	Salt Lake City Stars	

==== Subtractions ====
Date	Player	Reason	New Team	Ref.
July 1	Ömer Yurtseven	Waived	(Greece) Panathinaikos AKTOR Athens	
