= Sensabaugh =

Sensabaugh is a surname. Notable people with the surname include:

- Brice Sensabaugh (born 2003), American basketball player
- Coty Sensabaugh (born 1988), American football player
- Gerald Sensabaugh (born 1983), American football player
