= 2023–24 USC Trojans men's basketball team =

American college basketball season

2023–24 USC Trojans men's basketball
- Conference: Pac-12 Conference
- Record: 15–18 (8–12 Pac-12)
- Head coach: Andy Enfield (11th season)
- Assistant coaches: Chris Capko (8th season); Eric Mobley (6th season); Jay Morris (3rd season); Kurt Karis (1st season); Desmon Farmer (1st season)
- Home arena: Galen Center (Capacity: 10,258)

2023–24 Pac-12 Conference men's basketball standings
	Conf.				Overall
Team	W		L	PCT	W		L	PCT
No. 11 Arizona	15	–	5	.750	27	–	9	.750
No. 23 Washington State	14	–	6	.700	25	–	10	.714
Colorado	13	–	7	.650	26	–	11	.703
Oregon †	12	–	8	.600	24	–	12	.667
UCLA	10	–	10	.500	16	–	17	.485
Utah	9	–	11	.450	22	–	15	.595
California	9	–	11	.450	13	–	19	.406
Washington	9	–	11	.450	17	–	15	.531
USC	8	–	12	.400	15	–	18	.455
Stanford	8	–	12	.400	14	–	18	.438
Arizona State	8	–	12	.400	14	–	18	.438
Oregon State	5	–	15	.250	13	–	19	.406
† 2024 Pac-12 tournament winner Rankings from AP Poll

The 2023–24 USC Trojans men's basketball team represented the University of Southern California during the 2023–24 NCAA Division I men's basketball season. The Trojans were led by 11th-year head coach Andy Enfield and played their home games at the Galen Center for the 17th season in Los Angeles, California as members of the Pac-12 Conference. They finished the season 15–18, 8–12 in Pac-12 play to finish in a three-way tie for eighth place. As the No. 8 seed in the Pac-12 tournament, they defeated Washington in the first round before losing to Arizona.

On April 1, 2024, head coach Andy Enfield left the school to become the head coach at SMU. On April 5, the school named Arkansas head coach Eric Musselman the team's new head coach.

The season marked the team's last season as members of the Pac-12 Conference before joining the Big Ten Conference on July 1, 2024.

== Previous season ==
The Trojans finished the 2022–23 season 22–11, 14–6 in Pac-12 Play to finish in a tie for second place. As the No. 3 seed in the Pac-12 tournament, they lost to the Arizona State in the quarterfinals. The Trojans received an at-large bid to the NCAA tournament as the No. 10 seed in the East. They lost in the first round this time to Michigan State.

== Offseason ==
=== Departures ===
Name	Number	Pos.	Height	Weight	Year	Hometown	Reason for departure
Malik Thomas	1	G	6'5"	210	Sophomore	Fontana, CA	Transferred to San Francisco
Reese Dixon-Waters	2	G	6'5"	210	Junior	Long Beach, CA	Transferred to San Diego State
Drew Peterson	13	G	6'9"	205	RS Senior	Libertyville, IL	Graduated
Tre White	22	G	6'7"	210	Freshman	Dallas, TX	Transferred to Louisville
Iaroslav Niagu	55	F	7'0"	215	Freshman	Krasnodar, RUS	Transferred to Charlotte

=== Incoming transfers ===
Name	Number	Pos.	Height	Weight	Year	Hometown	Previous school
DJ Rodman	10	F	6'6"	225	GS	Newport Beach, CA	Washington State

=== 2023 recruiting class ===
College recruiting
Name	Hometown	School	Height	Weight	Commit date
Arrinten Page #8 C	Atlanta, GA	Wheeler High School	6 ft 11 in (2.11 m)	245 lb (111 kg)	Oct 10, 2022
Arrinten Page #8 C	Recruit ratings: Rivals: 247Sports: ESPN: (87)				
Isaiah Collier #1 PG	Atlanta, GA	Wheeler High School	6 ft 5 in (1.96 m)	210 lb (95 kg)	Nov 16, 2022
Isaiah Collier #1 PG	Recruit ratings: Rivals: 247Sports: ESPN: (94)				
Bronny James #6 SG	Los Angeles, CA	Sierra Canyon School	6 ft 4 in (1.93 m)	210 lb (95 kg)	May 6, 2023
Bronny James #6 SG	Recruit ratings: Rivals: 247Sports: ESPN: (89)				
Brandon Gardner #38 PF	Waynesboro, GA	Christ the King School	6 ft 8 in (2.03 m)	215 lb (98 kg)	Jun 27, 2023
Brandon Gardner #38 PF	Recruit ratings: Rivals: 247Sports: ESPN: (83)				
Overall recruit ranking:
Note: In many cases, Scout, Rivals, 247Sports, On3, and ESPN may conflict in their listings of height and weight.; In these cases, the average was taken. ESPN grades are on a 100-point scale.; Sources: "USC 2023 Basketball Commitments". Rivals.; "2023 USC Trojans Recruiting Class". ESPN.; "2023 Team Ranking". Rivals.

== Roster ==
2023–24 USC Trojans men's basketball team
Players
Coaches

Pos.	#	Name	Height	Weight	Year	Previous school	Hometown
G	0	Kobe Johnson (C)	6 ft 6 in (1.98 m)	200 lb (91 kg)	Jr	Nicolet	Milwaukee, WI
G	1	Isaiah Collier	6 ft 5 in (1.96 m)	210 lb (95 kg)	Fr	Wheeler	Atlanta, GA
F	3	Vince Iwuchukwu	7 ft 1 in (2.16 m)	240 lb (109 kg)	So	Southern California Academy	San Antonio, TX
G	4	Oziyah Sellers	6 ft 5 in (1.96 m)	185 lb (84 kg)	So	Southern California Academy	Hayward, CA
G	5	Boogie Ellis (C)	6 ft 3 in (1.91 m)	190 lb (86 kg)	GS	Mission Bay; Memphis	San Diego, CA
G	6	Bronny James	6 ft 4 in (1.93 m)	210 lb (95 kg)	Fr	Sierra Canyon	Los Angeles, CA
F	10	DJ Rodman	6 ft 6 in (1.98 m)	225 lb (102 kg)	GS	JSerra Catholic; Washington State	Newport Beach, CA
G	12	JD Plough (W)	6 ft 3 in (1.91 m)	180 lb (82 kg)	Sr	Peninsula; Los Angeles Harbor College	Palos Verdes Peninsula, CA
F	13	Brandon Gardner	6 ft 8 in (2.03 m)	215 lb (98 kg)	Fr	Christ the King	Waynesboro, GA
G	15	Zach Brooker (W)	6 ft 0 in (1.83 m)	160 lb (73 kg)	Sr	Sierra Canyon	Calabasas, CA
F	22	Arrinten Page	6 ft 11 in (2.11 m)	245 lb (111 kg)	Fr	Wheeler	Atlanta, GA
F	24	Joshua Morgan	6 ft 11 in (2.11 m)	225 lb (102 kg)	RS Sr	Sheldon; Long Beach State	Sacramento, CA
F	30	Harrison Hornery	6 ft 10 in (2.08 m)	230 lb (104 kg)	Jr	Mater Dei	Toowoomba, Australia
F	33	Kijani Wright	6 ft 9 in (2.06 m)	235 lb (107 kg)	So	Sierra Canyon	Los Angeles, CA

Head coach

- Andy Enfield (Johns Hopkins)

Assistant coach(es)

- Chris Capko (South Florida)
- Eric Mobley (Portland)
- Jay Morris (Cal State Dominguez Hills)

Legend

- (C) Team captain
- (S) Suspended
- (I) Ineligible
- (W) Walk-on
- Injured
- Current redshirt

Roster
Last update: November 8, 2023

== Schedule and results ==
On May 19, the Trojans announced they would be doing a 10-day exhibition tour to Greece and Croatia between August 5-August 15. Source:

Date time, TV	Rank^{#}	Opponent^{#}	Result	Record	High points	High rebounds	High assists	Site (attendance) city, state
Exhibition
August 9, 2023; 9:00 a.m. PST, NBA TV		vs. Mega MIS; Foreign Summer Tour	W 76–73	–	25 – B. Ellis	6 – 3 Tied	4 – I. Colliers	(–); Mykonos, Greece
August 11, 2023; 9:00 a.m. PST, NBA TV		vs. Mega MIS; Foreign Summer Tour	W 71–62	–	21 – B. Ellis	8 – K. Johnson	3 – I. Colliers	– (–); Mykonos, Greece
August 13, 2023; 9:00 a.m. PST, NBA TV		vs. KK SC Derby; Foreign Summer Tour	W 96–87	–	21 – B. Ellis	4 – 2 Tied	5 – 2 Tied	– (–); Dubrovnik, Croatia
Non-conference regular season
November 6, 2023*; 7:00 p.m., TNT	No. 21	vs. Kansas State; Hall of Fame Series Las Vegas	W 82–69	1–0	24 – Ellis	8 – Tied	6 – Collier	T-Mobile Arena (7,595); Paradise, NV
November 9, 2023*; 6:00 p.m., P12N	No. 21	Cal State Bakersfield	W 85–59	2–0	19 – Collier	5 – Tied	5 – Collier	Galen Center (6,211); Los Angeles, CA
November 14, 2023*; 8:00 p.m., P12N	No. 16	UC Irvine	L 60–70	2–1	23 – Collier	10 – Morgan	2 – Tied	Galen Center (4,730); Los Angeles, CA
November 19, 2023*; 5:00 p.m., P12N	No. 16	Brown	W 81–70	3–1	28 – Ellis	9 – Tied	4 – Ellis	Galen Center (4,522); Los Angeles, CA
November 23, 2023*; 2:30 p.m., FS1	No. 23	vs. Seton Hall; Rady Children's Invitational Semifinal	W 71–63	4–1	22 – Ellis	6 – Johnson	5 – Collier	LionTree Arena (3,588); San Diego, CA
November 24, 2023*; 12:30 p.m., FOX	No. 23	vs. Oklahoma; Rady Children's Invitational Championship	L 70–72	4–2	16 – Tied	6 – Morgan	4 – Tied	LionTree Arena (3,912); San Diego, CA
November 29, 2023*; 8:00 p.m., P12N		Eastern Washington	W 106–78	5–2	28 – Ellis	6 – Iwuchukwu	7 – Johnson	Galen Center (3,177); Los Angeles, CA
December 2, 2023*; 7:00 p.m., ESPN		vs. No. 11 Gonzaga; Legends of Basketball Invitational	L 76–89	5–3	25 – Ellis	7 – Ellis	6 – Collier	MGM Grand Garden Arena (8,116); Paradise, NV
December 10, 2023*; 1:00 p.m., P12N		Long Beach State	L 79–84 ^{OT}	5–4	15 – Collier	6 – Iwuchukwu	5 – Johnson	Galen Center (9,806); Los Angeles, CA
December 17, 2023*; 10:00 a.m., ESPN		at Auburn	L 75–91	5–5	22 – Ellis	7 – Johnson	3 – Tied	Neville Arena (9,121); Auburn, AL
December 19, 2023*; 4:00 p.m., ESPN+		at Alabama State; Pac-12/SWAC Legacy Series	W 79–59	6–5	12 – Page	10 – Rodman	6 – Collier	Dunn–Oliver Acadome (7,500); Montgomery, AL
Pac-12 regular season
December 28, 2023; 6:00 p.m., ESPN2		at Oregon	L 74–82	6–6 (0–1)	14 – Tied	7 – Morgan	9 – Johnson	Matthew Knight Arena (8,934); Eugene, OR
December 30, 2023; 7:00 p.m., P12N		at Oregon State	L 70–86	6–7 (0–2)	20 – Ellis	3 – Tied	4 – Tied	Gill Coliseum (4,318); Corvallis, OR
January 3, 2024; 7:00 p.m., P12N		California	W 82–74	7–7 (1–2)	15 – Ellis	8 – Ellis	7 – Tied	Galen Center (4,603); Los Angeles, CA
January 6, 2024; 1:00 p.m., P12N		Stanford	W 93–79	8–7 (2–2)	26 – Collier	5 – Tied	5 – Johnson	Galen Center (6,481); Los Angeles, CA
January 10, 2024; 7:30 p.m., FS1		Washington State	L 64–72	8–8 (2–3)	18 – Ellis	8 – Rodman	4 – Johnson	Galen Center (6,218); Los Angeles, CA
January 13, 2024; 7:00 p.m., ESPN2		at Colorado	L 58–68	8–9 (2–4)	10 – Tied	7 – Tied	4 – Johnson	CU Events Center (10,005); Boulder, CO
January 17, 2024; 7:00 p.m., ESPN		at No. 12 Arizona	L 66–82	8–10 (2–5)	16 – Rodman	7 – Tied	6 – James	McKale Center (14,688); Tucson, AZ
January 20, 2024; 11:00 a.m., FOX		at Arizona State	L 67–82	8–11 (2–6)	14 – Iwuchukwu	12 – Iwuchukwu	5 – James	Desert Financial Arena (13,743); Tempe, AZ
January 27, 2024; 5:00 p.m., ESPN2		UCLA; Rivalry	L 50–65	8–12 (2–7)	10 – Sellers	5 – Morgan	3 – Tied	Galen Center (10,300); Los Angeles, CA
February 1, 2024; 7:30 p.m., ESPN		Oregon	L 69–78	8–13 (2–8)	17 – Ellis	7 – Rodman	7 – James	Galen Center (4,862); Los Angeles, CA
February 3, 2024; 4:00 p.m., P12N		Oregon State	W 82–54	9–13 (3–8)	14 – Hornery	14 – Rodman	5 – James	Galen Center (6,541); Los Angeles, CA
February 7, 2024; 8:00 p.m., P12N		at California	L 77–83 ^{OT}	9–14 (3–9)	20 – Collier	5 – James	4 – Morgan	Haas Pavilion (11,801); Berkeley, CA
February 10, 2024; 7:00 p.m., ESPNU		at Stanford	L 68–99	9–15 (3–10)	18 – Collier	4 – Collier	3 – Tied	Maples Pavilion (7,563); Stanford, CA
February 15, 2024; 8:00 p.m., FS1		Utah	W 68–64	10–15 (4–10)	15 – Collier	7 – Rodman	6 – Collier	Galen Center (5,122); Los Angeles, CA
February 17, 2024; 7:00 p.m., ESPN		Colorado	L 89–92 ^{2OT}	10–16 (4–11)	30 – Ellis	4 – Tied	9 – Collier	Galen Center (6,142); Los Angeles, CA
February 24, 2024; 7:00 p.m., ESPN		at UCLA; Rivalry	W 62–56	11–16 (5–11)	24 – Ellis	5 – Tied	4 – Collier	Pauley Pavilion (13,659); Los Angeles, CA
February 29, 2024; 7:30 p.m., P12N		at No. 19 Washington State	L 72–75	11–17 (5–12)	24 – Collier	5 – Tied	4 – Johnson	Beasley Coliseum (8,288); Pullman, WA
March 2, 2024; 1:00 p.m., CBS		at Washington	W 82–75	12–17 (6–12)	31 – Collier	9 – Johnson	5 – Johnson	Alaska Airlines Arena (9,294); Seattle, WA
March 7, 2024; 8:00 p.m., FS1		Arizona State	W 81–73	13–17 (7–12)	28 – Ellis	8 – Morgan	5 – Collier	Galen Center (6,834); Los Angeles, CA
March 9, 2024; 7:00 p.m., ESPN		No. 5 Arizona; Senior Night	W 77–65	14–17 (8–12)	19 – Tied	7 – Rodman	5 – Collier	Galen Center (8,976); Los Angeles, CA
Pac-12 tournament
March 13, 2024; 12:00 p.m., P12N	(9)	vs. (8) Washington; First round	W 80−74	15–17	25 – Ellis	8 – Johnson	7 – Collier	T-Mobile Arena (10,050); Paradise, NV
March 14, 2024; 12:00 p.m., P12N	(9)	vs. (1) No. 6 Arizona; Quarterfinals	L 49−70	15–18	14 – Johnson	8 – Johnson	3 – Collier	T-Mobile Arena (14,076); Paradise, NV
*Non-conference game. ^{#}Rankings from AP Poll. (#) Tournament seedings in parentheses. All times are in Pacific Time.

== Game summaries ==
This section will be filled in as the season progresses.

=== Kansas State Wildcats (Hall of Fame Series Las Vegas) ===
TNT/Max

November 6th, 2023
7:00 p.m. PST

Recap

Kansas State Wildcats 69, No. 21 USC Trojans 82
Scoring by half: 30-40, 39-42
Pts: Tylor Perry - 22; Rebs: David N'Guessan - 10; Asts: Tylor Perry - 2	Pts: Boogie Ellis - 25; Rebs: Boogie Ellis, Kobe Johnson - 8 Asts: Isaiah Collier - 6

T-Mobile Arena • Paradise, Nevada
Attendance: 7,595
Referees: Randy Richardson, Mike Greenstein, Kipp Kissinger

=== vs Cal State Bakersfield Roadrunners ===
Pac-12 Network

November 9th, 2023
6:00 p.m. PST

Recap

Cal State Bakersfield Roadrunners 59, No. 21 USC Trojans 85
Scoring by half: 23-47, 36-38
Pts: Kaleb Higgins - 19; Rebs: Modestas Kancleris - 8 Asts: Kaleb Higgins - 5	Pts: Isaiah Collier - 19; Rebs: Harrison Hornery - 5 Asts: Isaiah Collier - 5

Galen Center • Los Angeles, California
Attendance: 6,211
Referees: Gerry Pollard, Brooks Wells, Kipp Kissinger

=== vs UC Irvine Anteaters ===
Pac-12 Network

November 14th, 2023
8:00 p.m. PST

Recap

UC Irvine Anteaters 70, No. 16 USC Trojans 60
Scoring by half: 29-26, 41-34
Pts: Justin Hohn - 25; Rebs: Devin Tillis - 10; Asts: Pierre Crockrell II - 6	Pts: Isaiah Collier - 23; Rebs: Joshua Morgan- 10; Asts: DJ Rodman, Oziyah Sellers - 2

Galen Center • Los Angeles, California
Attendance: 4,730
Referees: Michael Greenstein, Michael Scyphers, Michael Irving

=== vs Brown Bears ===
Pac-12 Network

November 19th, 2023
5:00 p.m. PST

Recap

Brown Bears 70, No. 16 USC Trojans 81
Scoring by half: 32-35, 38-46
Pts: Kino Lily Jr. - 24; Rebs: Nana Owusu-Anane - 11; Asts: Kino Lily Jr. - 6	Pts: Boogie Ellis - 28; Rebs: Joshua Morgan - 9 Asts: Boogie Ellis - 4

Galen Center • Los Angeles, California
Attendance: 4,522
Referees: Frank Harvey III, Matt Rafferty, Verne Harris

=== Seton Hall Pirates (Rady Children's Invitational semifinal) ===
FS1

November 23rd, 2023
2:30 p.m. PST

Recap

Seton Hall Pirates 63, No. 23 USC Trojans 71
Scoring by half: 22-32, 41-39
Pts: Kadary Richmond- 18; Rebs: Dylan Addae-Wusu - 9 Asts: Dre Davis - 3	Pts: Boogie Ellis - 22; Rebs: Kobe Johnson - 6 Asts: Isaiah Collier - 5

LionTree Arena • San Diego, California
Attendance: 3,588
Referees: Nathan Farrel, Randy McCall, Roger Ayers

=== Oklahoma Sooners (Rady Children's Invitational Championship Game) ===
FOX

November 24th, 2023
12:30 p.m PST

Recap

Oklahoma Sooners 72, USC Trojans 70
Scoring by half: 36-39, 36-31
Pts: Javian McCollum - 18; Rebs: Jalon Moore - 6 Asts: Milos Uzan - 4	Pts: Boogie Ellis, Kobe Johnson - 16; Rebs: Joshua Morgan - 6 Asts: Boogie Ellis, Isaiah Collier - 4

LionTree Arena • San Diego, California
Attendance: 3,912
Referees: DJ Catstenson, Brooks Wells, Roger Ayers

=== vs Eastern Washington Eagles ===
Pac-12 Network

November 29th, 2023
8:00 p.m. PST

Recap

Eastern Washington Eagles 78, USC Trojans 106
Scoring by half: 33-52, 45-54
Pts: Jake Kyman - 25; Rebs: Cedric Coward - 9 Asts: Ellis Magnuson - 6	Pts: Boogie Ellis - 28; Rebs: Vincent Iwuchukwu - 6 Asts: Kobe Johnson - 7

Galen Center • Los Angeles, California
Attendance: 3,177
Referees: Rick Crawford, DeSelle Dean, Jeffery Anderson

=== Gonzaga Bulldogs (Legends of Basketball Invitational) ===
ESPN

December 2nd, 2023
7:00 p.m. PST

Recap

Gonzaga Bulldogs 89, USC Trojans 76
Scoring by half: 44-37, 45-39
Pts: Ryan Nembhard, Dusty Stromer - 15; Rebs: Graham Ike - 10; Asts: Ryan Nembhard - 7	Pts: Boogie Ellis - 28; Rebs: Boogie Ellis - 7 Asts: Isaiah Collier - 6

MGM Grand Garden Arena • Las Vegas, Nevada
Attendance: 8,116
Referees: Chance Moore, Greg Nixon, Randy McCall

=== vs Long Beach State Beach ===
Pac-12 Network

December 10th, 2023
1:00 p.m. PST

Recap

Long Beach State Beach 84, USC Trojans 79 (OT)
Scoring by half: 30−45, 45−29 Overtime: 10-5
Pts: Marcus Tsohonis - 28; Rebs: Jadon Jones, Aboubacar Traore - 8 Asts: Aboubacar Traore - 5	Pts: Isaiah Collier, Vincent Iwuchukwu- 15; Rebs: Kobe Johnson - 8 Asts: Kobe Johnson- 5

Galen Center • Los Angeles, California
Attendance: 9,806
Referees: Brook Wells, Kipp Kissinger, Tony Padilla

=== at Auburn Tigers ===
ESPN

December 17th, 2023
10:00 a.m. PST

USC Trojans 75, Auburn Tigers 91
Scoring by half: 35−49, 40−42
Pts: Boogie Ellis − 22; Rebs: Kobe Johnson − 7 Asts: Boogie Ellis − 3	Pts: Aden Holloway − 15; Rebs: Dylan Cardwell − 5 Asts: Aden Holloway − 6

Neville Arena • Auburn, Alabama
Attendance: 9,121
Referees: Don Daily, Terry Oglesby, K.B. Burdett

=== at Alabama State Hornets ===
Pac-12 Network

December 19th, 2023
TBD p.m. PST

USC Trojans 79, Alabama State Hornets 59
Scoring by half: 39−18, 40−41
Pts: Arrinten Page − 12; Rebs: DJ Rodman − 10; Asts: Isaiah Collier − 6	Pts: TJ Madlock − 17; Rebs: Ubong Okon − 9 Asts: TJ Madlock − 3

Dunn-Oliver Acadome • Montgomery, Alabama
Attendance: 7,500
Referees: Patrick Evans, Mike Nance, Byron Jarrett

=== at Oregon Ducks ===
ESPN2

December 28th, 2023
6:30 p.m. PST

USC Trojans 74, Oregon Ducks 82
Scoring by half: 25−42, 49−40
Pts: tied, − 14; Rebs: Joshua Morgan − 7 Asts: Kobe Johnson − 9	Pts: Kwame Evans Jr. − 22; Rebs: Kwame Evans Jr. − 8 Asts: Jermaine Couisnard − 3

Matthew Knight Arena • Eugene, Oregon
Attendance: 8,934
Referees: Ray Natili, Verne Harris, Tony Padilla

=== at Oregon State Beavers ===
Pac-12 Network

December 30th, 2023
7:00 p.m. PST

USC Trojans 70, Oregon State Beavers 86
Scoring by half: 30−39, 40−47
Pts: Boogie Ellis − 20; Rebs: tied, − 3 Asts: Joshua Morgan − 5	Pts: Tyler Bilodeau − 26; Rebs: tied, − 5 Asts: Jordan Pope − 6

Gill Coliseum • Corvallis, Oregon
Attendance: 4,318
Referees: Doug Shows, Jeb Hartness, Michael Greenstein

=== vs California Golden Bears ===
Pac-12 Network

January 3rd, 2024
7:00 p.m. PST

California Golden Bears 74, USC Trojans 82
Scoring by half: 29−37, 45−45
Pts: Jaylon Tyson − 23; Rebs: Fardaw Aimaq − 8 Asts: Fardaw Aimaq − 8	Pts: Boogie Ellis − 15; Rebs: Boogie Ellis − 8 Asts: tied, − 7

Galen Center • Los Angeles, California
Attendance: 4,603
Referees: Deron White, Michael Irving, Michael Reed

=== vs Stanford Cardinal ===
Pac-12 Network

January 6th, 2024
1:00 p.m. PST

Stanford Cardinal 79, USC Trojans 93
Scoring by half: 35−39, 44−54
Pts: Michael Jones − 23; Rebs: Maxine Raynaud − 10; Asts: Brandon Angel − 6	Pts: Isaiah Collier − 26; Rebs: tied − 5 Asts: Kobe Johnson − 4

Galen Center • Los Angeles, California
Attendance: 6,481
Referees: Matthew Rukasin, Kelly Pfeifer, Kipp Kissinger

=== vs Washington State Cougars ===
FS1

January 10th, 2024
7:30 p.m. PST

Washington State Cougars 72, USC Trojans 64
Scoring by half: 28−28, 42−36
Pts: Isaac Jones − 26; Rebs: Isaac Jones − 11; Asts: Myles Rice − 5	Pts: Boogie Ellis − 2618; Rebs: DJ Rodman − 8 Asts: Kobe Johnson − 4

Galen Center • Los Angeles, California
Attendance: 6,218
Referees: Randy McCall, Jeffrey Anderson, Michael Reed

=== at Colorado Buffaloes ===
ESPN2

January 13th, 2024
7:00 p.m. PST

USC Trojans 58, Colorado Buffaloes 68
Scoring by half: 37−24, 21−44
Pts: Oziyah Sellers − 18; Rebs: tied − 7 Asts: Kobe Johnson − 4	Pts: J'Vonne Hadley − 15; Rebs: J'Vonne Hadley − 9 Asts: KJ Simpson − 4

CU Events Center • Boulder, Colorado
Attendance: 10,005
Referees: Justin Shamion, De Selle Dean, DG Nelson

=== at Arizona Wildcats ===
ESPN

January 17th, 2024
7:00 p.m. PST

Recap

USC Trojans 67, No. 12 Arizona Wildcats 82
Scoring by half: 35−45, 32−37
Pts: DJ Rodman − 16; Rebs: Tied − 7 Asts: Bronny James − 6	Pts: Love − 20; Rebs: Tied − 7 Asts: Love − 5

McKale Center • Tucson, Arizona
Attendance: 14,688
Referees: Randy Richardson, Verne Harris, Michael Reed

=== at Arizona State Sun Devils ===
FOX

January 20th, 2025
11:00 a.m. PST

Recap

USC Trojans 67, Arizona State Sun Devils 82
Pts: Iwuchukwu, 14; Rebs: Iwuchukwu, 12; Asts: James, 5	Pts: Perez, 20; Rebs: Selebangue, 13; Asts: Collins, 7

Desert Financial Arena • Tempe, Arizona
Attendance: 13,743
Referees: Frank Harvey III, Tommy Johnson, Gregory Nixon

=== vs UCLA Bruins (Rivalry) ===
ESPN2

January 27th, 2025
5:00 p.m. PST

Recap

UCLA Bruins 65, USC Trojans 50
Scoring by half: 37−26, 28−24
Pts: Andrews − 20; Rebs: Bona − 10; Asts: Andrews − 4	Pts: Sellers − 10; Rebs: Morgan − 5 Asts: Tied − 3

Galen Center • Los Angeles, California
Attendance: 10,300
Referees: DG Nelson, Michael Irving, Tony Padilla

=== vs Oregon Ducks ===
ESPN

February 1st, 2024
7:30 p.m. PST

Recap

Oregon Ducks 78, USC Trojans 69
Scoring by half: 46−39, 32−30
Pts: Shelstad − 20; Rebs: Couisnard − 7 Asts: Shelstad − 6	Pts: Ellis − 17; Rebs: Rodman − 7 Asts: James − 7

Galen Center • Los Angeles, California
Attendance: 4,862
Referees: Terry Oglesby, Kipp Kissinger, Brooks Wells

=== vs Oregon State Beavers ===
P12N

February 3rd, 2024
4:00 p.m. PST

Recap

Oregon State Beavers 54, USC Trojans 82
Scoring by half: 23−38, 31−44
Pts: Pope − 14; Rebs: Lake II − 4 Asts: Akanno − 4	Pts: Hornery − 14; Rebs: Rodman − 14; Asts: James − 6

Galen Center • Los Angeles, California
Attendance: 6,541
Referees: D.J. Carstensen, Lewis Garrison, Verne Harris

=== at California Golden Bears ===
P12N

February 7th, 2024
8:00 p.m. PST

Recap

USC Trojans 77, California Golden Bears 83 (OT)
Scoring by half: 31−42, 36−25 Overtime: 10−16
Pts: Collier − 20; Rebs: James − 5 Asts: Morgan − 4	Pts: Tyson − 27; Rebs: Aimaq − 20; Asts: Aimaq − 5

Haas Pavilion • Berkeley, California
Attendance: 11,801
Referees: Kelly Pfeifer, Randy Richardson, Gregory Nixon

=== at Stanford Cardinal ===
ESPNU

February 10th, 2024
7:00 p.m. PST

USC Trojans 68, Stanford Cardinal 99
Scoring by half: 26−55, 42−44
Pts: Collier − 18; Rebs: Tied − 4 Asts: Ellis − 4	Pts: Raynaud − 25; Rebs: Raynaud − 9 Asts: Raynaud − 5

Maples Pavilion • Stanford, California
Attendance: 7,563
Referees: Chuck Jones, Michael Greenstein, Michael Reed

=== vs Utah Utes ===
FS1

February 15th, 2024
8:00 p.m. PST

Recap

Utah Utes 64, USC Trojans 68
Scoring by half: 29−34, 35−34
Pts: Deivon Smith − 19; Rebs: Deivon Smith − 9 Asts: Deivon Smith − 7	Pts: Isaiah Collier, 15; Rebs: DJ Rodman, 7 Asts: Isaiah Collier, 6

Galen Center • Los Angeles, California
Attendance: 5,122
Referees: Amy Bonner, Marques Pettigrew, Gerry Pollard

=== vs Colorado Buffaloes ===
ESPN2

February 17th, 2024
7:00 p.m. PST

Recap

Colorado Buffaloes 92, USC Trojans 89 (2OT)
Scoring by half: 33−39, 40−34 Overtime: 10−10, 9−6
Pts: K.J. Simpson − 30; Rebs: J'Vonne Hadley − 10; Asts: K.J. Simpson − 5	Pts: Boogie Ellis − 30; Rebs: Tied − 4 Asts: Isaiah Collier − 9

Galen Center • Los Angeles, California
Attendance: 6,142
Referees: Jason Garretson, Randy Richardson, Mike Littlewood

=== at UCLA Bruins (Rivalry) ===
ESPN

February 24th, 2024
TBD p.m. PST

Recap

USC Trojans 62, UCLA Bruins 56
Scoring by half: 34−34, 28−22
Pts: Boogie Ellis − 24; Rebs: Tied − 5 Asts: Isaiah Collier − 4	Pts: Adem Bona − 14; Rebs: Tied − 6 Asts: Dylan Andrews − 5

Pauley Pavilion • Los Angeles, California
Attendance: 13,659
Referees: Mark Fulton, Michael Scyphers, Michael Reed

=== at Washington State Cougars ===
P12N

February 29th, 2024
7:30 p.m. PST

Recap

USC Trojans 72, No. 19 Washington State Cougars 75
Scoring by half: 39−35, 33−40
Pts: Isaiah Collier − 24; Rebs: Tied − 5 Asts: Kobe Johnson − 4	Pts: Andrej Jakimovski − 18; Rebs: Tied − 5 Asts: Myles Rice − 8

Beasley Coliseum • Pullman, Washington
Attendance: 8,288
Referees: Randy Richardson, Mike Littlewood, Jeffrey Anderson

=== at Washington Huskies ===
CBS

March 2nd, 2024
1:00 p.m. PST

Recap

USC Trojans 82, Washington Huskies 75
Scoring by half: 39−38, 43−37
Pts: Isaiah Collier − 31; Rebs: Kobe Johnson − 9 Asts: Kobe Johnson − 5	Pts: Keion Brooks Jr. − 20; Rebs: Keion Brooks Jr. − 7 Asts: Paul Mulcahy − 7

Alaska Airlines Arena • Seattle, Washington
Attendance: 9,294
Referees: Nate Harris, Michael Greenstein, Tony Padilla

=== vs Arizona State Sun Devils ===
FS1

March 7th, 2024
8:00 p.m. PST

Recap

Arizona State Sun Devils 73, USC Trojans 81
Scoring by half: 32−32, 41−49
Pts: Jose Perez − 25; Rebs: Adam Miller − 4 Asts: Frankie Collins − 6	Pts: Boogie Ellis − 28; Rebs: Joshua Morgan − 8 Asts: Isaiah Collier − 5

Galen Center • Los Angeles, California
Attendance: 6,834
Referees: Kelly Pfeifer, DG Nelson, John Gaffney

=== vs No. 5 Arizona Wildcats ===
ESPN

March 9th, 2024
7:00 p.m. PST

Recap

No. 5 Arizona Wildcats 65, USC Trojans 78
Scoring by half: 30−34, 35−45
Pts: Tied − 17; Rebs: Oumar Ballo − 10; Asts: Keshad Johnson − 5	Pts: Tied − 19; Rebs: DJ Rodman − 7 Asts: Isaiah Collier − 5

Galen Center • Los Angeles, California
Attendance: 8,976
Referees: Layne Barney, Eric Curry, Michael Reed

== Pac-12 Tournament ==
=== vs Washington (Pac-12 First Round) ===
P12N

March 13, 2024
12:00 p.m. PST

Recap

No. 8 Washington Huskies 74, No. 9 USC Trojans 80
Scoring by half: 42−37, 32−43
Pts: Sahvir Wheeler − 20; Rebs: Keion Brooks Jr. − 8 Asts: Sahvir Wheeler − 7	Pts: Boogie Ellis − 25; Rebs: Kobe Johnson − 8 Asts: Isaiah Collier − 7

T-Mobile Arena • Las Vegas, Nevada
Attendance: 10,050
Referees: Justin Shamion, Chance Moore, Tony Padilla

=== vs Arizona (Pac-12 Quarterfinal) ===
P12N

March 14, 2024
12:00 p.m. PST

Recap

No. 1 Arizona Wildcats 70, No. 9 USC Trojans 49
Scoring by half: 28−16, 42−33
Pts: KJ Lewis − 15; Rebs: Oumar Ballo − 13; Asts: Tied − 17	Pts: Kobe Johnson − 14; Rebs: Kobe Johnson − 8 Asts: Isaiah Collier − 2

T-Mobile Arena • Las Vegas, Nevada
Attendance: 14,076
Referees: Mike Littlewood, Deldre Carr, Jason Garretson

== Awards and honors ==
Weekly honors
Recipient (Position)	Award (Pac-12 Conference)	Stats (PPG/RPG/APG)	Week	Date Awarded	Ref.
Isaiah Collier	Pac−12 Freshman of the Week	18.5 ppg/5.5 apg	Week 1	November 13, 2023	
Isaiah Collier	Pac−12 Freshman of the Week	23.5 ppg/3.0 rpg	Week 2	November 20, 2023	
Isaiah Collier	Pac−12 Freshman of the Week	19.5 ppg/5.5 apg	Week 9	January 8, 2024	
Isaiah Collier	Pac−12 Freshman of the Week	27.5 ppg	Week 17	March 4, 2024	
Boogie Ellis	Pac−12 Player of the Week	28.0 ppg/4.5 rpg/2.5 apg/2.0 spg	Week 4	December 4, 2023	

=== Midseason awards watchlists ===
Midseason award honors
Honors	Player	Position	Ref.

=== Final awards watchlists ===
Final award honors
Honors	Player	Position	Ref.

=== Postseason ===
Conference honors
Recipient (Position)	Award (Pac-12 Conference)	Stats (PPG/RPG/APG)	Ref.
Boogie Ellis	All-Pac-12 second team	16.9 ppg/3.5 rpg/3.0 apg/1.4 spg	
Isaiah Collier	All Pac-12 Freshman Team	16.4 ppg/2.9 rpg/4.3 apg/1.5 spg	
Kobe Johnson	All Pac-12 Defensive Team	10.8 ppg/4.5 rpg/3.3 apg/2.3 spg	

==== National awards ====
National award honors
Honors	Player	Position	Ref.

== Rankings ==
Ranking movements Legend: ██ Increase in ranking ██ Decrease in ranking — = Not ranked RV = Received votes
	Week																				
Poll	Pre	1	2	3	4	5	6	7	8	9	10	11	12	13	14	15	16	17	18	19	Final
AP	21	16	23	RV	—	—	—	—	—	—	—	—	—	—	—	—	—	—	—	—	
Coaches	22	20	RV	RV	RV	—	—	—	—	—	—	—	—	—	—	—	—	—	—	—	

*AP does not release post-NCAA Tournament rankings
