= Isaiah Collier =

American basketball player (born 2004)

No. 8 – Utah Jazz
- Position: Point guard
- League: NBA

Personal information
- Born: October 8, 2004 (age 22) Atlanta, Georgia, U.S.
- Listed height: 6 ft 4 in (1.93 m)
- Listed weight: 210 lb (95 kg)

Career information
- High school: Wheeler (Marietta, Georgia)
- College: USC (2023–2024)
- NBA draft: 2024: 1st round, 29th overall pick
- Drafted by: Utah Jazz
- Playing career: 2024–present

Career history
- 2024–present: Utah Jazz
- 2024: →Salt Lake City Stars

Career highlights
- Pac-12 All-Freshman Team (2024); Naismith Prep Player of the Year (2023); Morgan Wootten National Player of the Year (2023); McDonald's All-American Game Co-MVP (2023); Jordan Brand Classic (2023); Nike Hoop Summit (2023); Mr. Georgia Basketball (2023)
- Stats at NBA.com
- Stats at Basketball Reference

Isaiah Jaden Collier (born October 8, 2004) is an American professional basketball player for the Utah Jazz of the National Basketball Association (NBA). He played college basketball for the USC Trojans. He was a consensus five-star recruit and one of the top players in the 2023 class.

== Early life ==
Collier grew up in Marietta, Georgia and attended Wheeler High School. His coach at Wheeler was his uncle, Larry Thompson. Collier averaged 18 points, seven rebounds, seven assists, and two steals per game as a junior. He played in the Nike Elite Youth Basketball League (EYBL) following the season and averaged 17.6 points, 5.1 rebounds, and 6.5 assists per game. Collier suffered a meniscus injury in his knee while participating in workouts with the United States under-18 basketball team in May 2022, which caused him to miss the rest of the EYBL circuit. He participated in the Curry Camp and was named the camp's MVP.

Collier for his senior year averaged 19.6 points, 6.8 assists, 5.5 rebounds, and 2.2 steals while shooting 52 percent from inside the arc, 38 percent from 3-point range, and 77 percent from the free throw line.

Collier was selected to play in the 2023 McDonald's All-American Boys Game during his senior year. He was also selected to play for Team USA in the Nike Hoops Summit. Collier won the 2023 Naismith Prep Player of the Year Award and was named Mr. Georgia Basketball.

Collier was a consensus five-star recruit and one of the top players in the 2023 class, according to major recruiting services. He was rated as the number one overall prospect for the 2023 class by ESPN and Rivals. On November 16, 2022, Collier committed to playing college basketball for USC after considering offers from Cincinnati, Michigan, and UCLA.

College recruiting
Name	Hometown	School	Height	Weight	Commit date
Isaiah Collier; PG	Atlanta, GA	Wheeler (GA)	6 ft 4 in (1.93 m)	205 lb (93 kg)	Nov 16, 2022
Isaiah Collier; PG	Recruit ratings: Rivals: 247Sports: ESPN: (94)				
Overall recruit ranking: Rivals: 1 247Sports: 2 ESPN: 1
Note: In many cases, Scout, Rivals, 247Sports, On3, and ESPN may conflict in their listings of height and weight.; In these cases, the average was taken. ESPN grades are on a 100-point scale.; Sources: "USC 2023 Basketball Commitments". Rivals.; "2023 USC Trojans Recruiting Class". ESPN.; "2023 Team Ranking". Rivals.

== College career ==
Collier enrolled at the University of Southern California in June 2023. He started the Trojans' season opener against Kansas State and scored 18 points with three rebounds and six assists before fouling out of the game.

Collier averaged 16.3 points, 4.3 assists and 1.5 steals per game. On April 10, 2024, Collier declared for the 2024 NBA draft, forgoing his remaining college eligibility.

== Professional career ==
On June 26, 2024, Collier was selected with the 29th overall pick by the Utah Jazz in the 2024 NBA draft and on July 2, he signed with the Jazz. Throughout his rookie season, he has been assigned several times to the Salt Lake City Stars.

On January 26, 2025, Collier was named the starting point guard in place of Keyonte George. On February 8, Collier set a new Jazz rookie record for assists in a half, totaling 10 in the first half against the Phoenix Suns. On February 28, Collier recorded a career-high 14 assists in a 117–116 win over the Minnesota Timberwolves. He was named February's Western Conference Rookie of the Month after averaging 11.5 points, 9.5 assists and 3.9 rebounds per month. On March 31, in a game against the Charlotte Hornets, Collier surpassed John Stockton's previous record of 415 for the most assists recorded in a season by a rookie in Jazz franchise history.

On February 3, 2026, Collier recorded a career-high 22 assists in a 131–122 win over the Indiana Pacers, the most assists in a game by a player in Jazz franchise history since John Stockton in 1992.

== Career statistics ==
Legend
GP	Games played	GS	Games started	MPG	Minutes per game
FG%	Field goal percentage	3P%	3-point field goal percentage	FT%	Free throw percentage
RPG	Rebounds per game	APG	Assists per game	SPG	Steals per game
BPG	Blocks per game	PPG	Points per game	**Bold**	Career high

=== NBA ===
Year	Team	GP	GS	MPG	FG%	3P%	FT%	RPG	APG	SPG	BPG	PPG
2024–25	Utah	**71**	**46**	**25.9**	.422	.249	.682	**3.3**	6.3	.9	.2	8.7
2025–26	Utah	59	19	25.7	**.495**	**.270**	**.722**	2.5	**7.2**	**1.1**	**.3**	**11.7**
Career		130	65	25.8	.457	.257	.705	3.0	6.7	1.0	.3	10.0

=== College ===
Year	Team	GP	GS	MPG	FG%	3P%	FT%	RPG	APG	SPG	BPG	PPG
2023–24	USC	27	26	30.0	.490	.338	.673	2.9	4.3	1.5	.2	16.3

== See also ==
- List of NBA single-game assists leaders
