= Judah Mintz (basketball) =

American basketball player (born 2003)

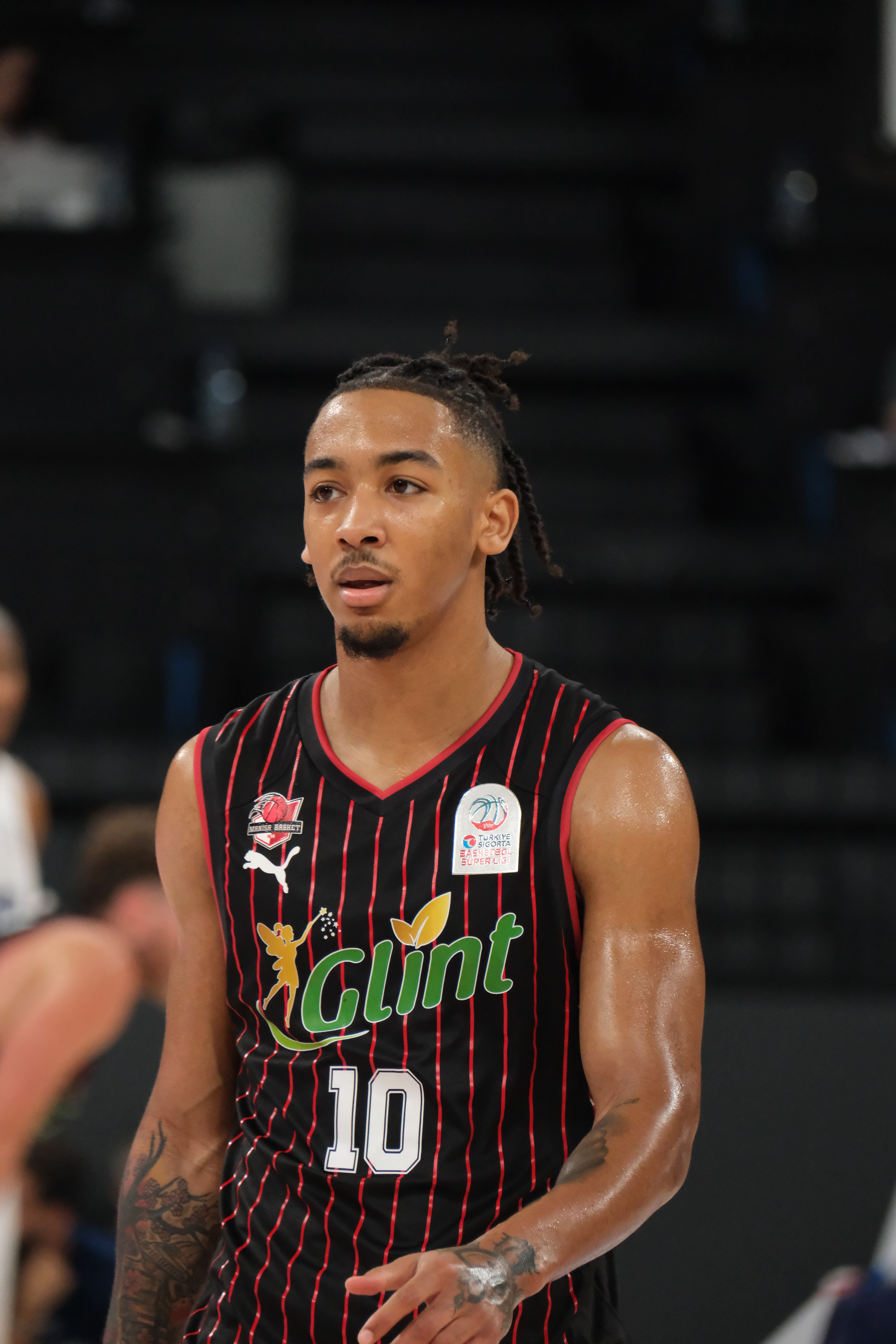
- Mintz with Körfez Basket in 2025

No. 10 – Fraport Skyliners
- Position: Point guard / shooting guard
- League: Basketball Bundesliga; EuroCup

Personal information
- Born: July 10, 2003 (age 23) Fort Washington, Maryland, U.S.
- Listed height: 6 ft 4 in (1.93 m)
- Listed weight: 185 lb (84 kg)

Career information
- High school: Gonzaga College (Washington, D.C.); Oak Hill Academy (Mouth of Wilson, Virginia)
- College: Syracuse (2022–2024)
- NBA draft: 2024: undrafted
- Playing career: 2024–present

Career history
- 2024: Delaware Blue Coats
- 2025–2026: Manisa Basket
- 2026–present: Skyliners Frankfurt

Career highlights
- Second-team All-ACC (2024); ACC All-Freshman team (2023)
- Stats at NBA.com
- Stats at Basketball Reference

Judah Jah Leone Mintz (born July 10, 2003) is an American professional basketball player for Basketball Bundesliga (BBL) and the EuroCup. He played college basketball for the Syracuse Orange.

== Early life and high school ==
Mintz grew up in Fort Washington, Maryland and initially attended Gonzaga College High School. He averaged nine points per game as a sophomore. During his junior season, Mintz averaged 16 points per game. He transferred to Oak Hill Academy in Mouth of Wilson, Virginia before his senior year. Mintz was named to the second team of the All-National Interscholastic Basketball Conference after averaging 16.8 points per game.

Mintz was rated as a four-star recruit. He initially committed to playing college basketball for the Pittsburgh Panthers but later decommitted from the program. Mintz ultimately signed to play for the Syracuse Orange."

== College career ==
Mintz began his freshman season at Syracuse as a starting guard. He earned a spot on the Atlantic Coast Conference (ACC) All-Freshman team by averaging 16.3 points, 4.6 assists, and 1.8 steals per game. Following the season, Mintz declared for the 2023 NBA draft while maintaining his college eligibility. However, he later withdrew from the draft and chose to return to Syracuse for his sophomore year.

On April 11, 2024, Mintz declared for the 2024 NBA draft, forgoing his remaining college eligibility."

== Professional career ==
=== Delaware Blue Coats (2024–2025) ===
After going undrafted in the 2024 NBA draft, Mintz signed an Exhibit 10 contract with the Philadelphia 76ers on September 1, 2024, but was waived on October 17. On October 28, he joined the Delaware Blue Coats.

=== Körfez Basket (2025–2026) ===
On August 4, 2025, he signed with Körfez Basket of the Basketbol Süper Ligi (BSL).

=== Frankfurt Skyliners (2026–present) ===
On August 13, 2026 he signed with the Skyliners Frankfurt of the Basketball-Bundesliga.

== Career statistics ==
Legend
| GP | Games played | GS | Games started | MPG | Minutes per game |
| FG% | Field goal percentage | 3P% | 3-point field goal percentage | FT% | Free throw percentage |
| RPG | Rebounds per game | APG | Assists per game | SPG | Steals per game |
| BPG | Blocks per game | PPG | Points per game | **Bold** | Career high |

=== College ===
| Year | Team | GP | GS | MPG | FG% | 3P% | FT% | RPG | APG | SPG | BPG | PPG |
|---|---|---|---|---|---|---|---|---|---|---|---|---|
| 2022–23 | Syracuse | **32** | **32** | 33.5 | **.443** | **.303** | .751 | 2.3 | **4.6** | 1.8 | .1 | 16.3 |
| 2023–24 | Syracuse | **32** | 31 | **33.9** | .438 | .282 | **.765** | **3.2** | 4.4 | **2.1** | **.1** | **18.8** |
| Career | | 64 | 63 | 33.7 | .440 | .291 | .759 | 2.7 | 4.5 | 2.0 | .1 | 17.5 |
