= Boogie Ellis =

American basketball player (born 2000)

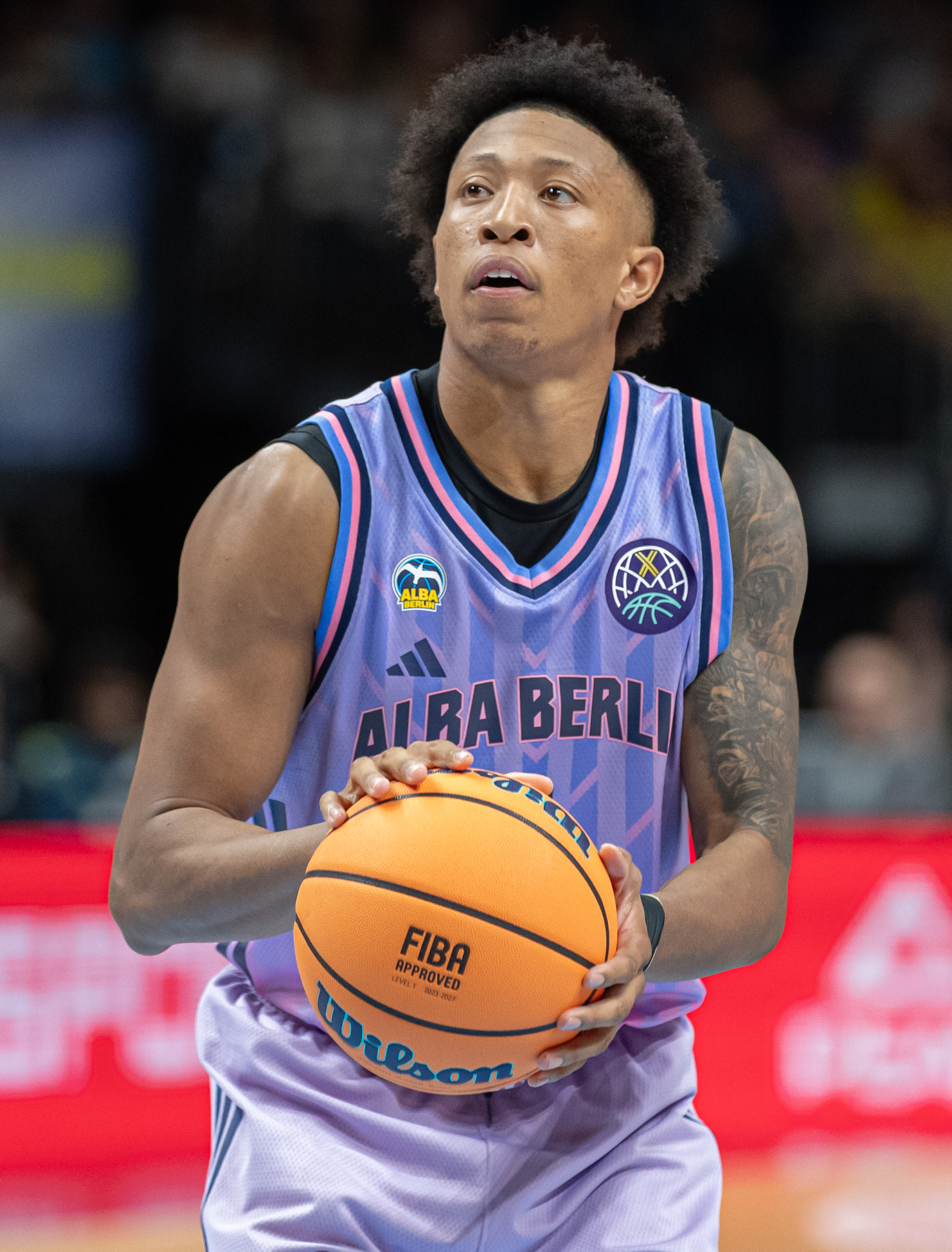
- Ellis in 2025

No. 3 – Joventut Badalona
- Position: Point guard / shooting guard
- League: Liga ACB

Personal information
- Born: December 12, 2000 (age 25) San Diego, California, U.S.
- Listed height: 6 ft 2 in (1.88 m)
- Listed weight: 190 lb (86 kg)

Career information
- High school: Mission Bay (San Diego, California)
- College: Memphis (2019–2021); USC (2021–2024)
- NBA draft: 2024: undrafted
- Playing career: 2024–present

Career history
- 2024–2025: Stockton Kings
- 2025: Indiana Mad Ants
- 2025: Alba Berlin
- 2025–2026: Dubai Basketball
- 2026: →Galatasaray
- 2026–present: Joventut Badalona

Career highlights
- Spanish Supercup winner (2026); First-team All-Pac-12 (2023); Second-team All-Pac-12 (2024); NIT champion (2021); AAC Sixth Man of the Year (2021)
- Stats at NBA.com
- Stats at Basketball Reference

Rejean Amor "Boogie" Ellis (born December 12, 2000) is an American professional basketball player for Joventut Badalona of the Liga ACB. He played college basketball for Memphis and USC. He previously played for the Stockton Kings.

== High school career ==
Ellis is a native of San Diego. Ellis attended Mission Bay High School for his four years in high school.

=== Recruiting ===
Ellis was a consensus four-star recruit and one of the top players in the 2019 class, according to major recruiting services. On November 9, 2018, Ellis committed to playing college basketball for Duke. On May 2, 2019, he requested Duke to release his letter of intent allowing him to choose other schools to attend. He later explained that he wanted to be the starting point guard for the Blue Devils and Tre Jones returning impacted his decision. On May 13, 2019, Ellis committed to play for Memphis.

College recruiting
Name	Hometown	School	Height	Weight	Commit date
Boogie Ellis; PG	San Diego, CA	Mission Bay (CA)	6 ft 2 in (1.88 m)	170 lb (77 kg)	May 13, 2019
Boogie Ellis; PG	Recruit ratings: Rivals: 247Sports: ESPN: (88)				
Overall recruit ranking: Rivals: 37 247Sports: 33 ESPN: 39
Note: In many cases, Scout, Rivals, 247Sports, On3, and ESPN may conflict in their listings of height and weight.; In these cases, the average was taken. ESPN grades are on a 100-point scale.; Sources: "Memphis 2019 Basketball Commitments". Rivals.; "2019 Memphis Tigers Recruiting Class". ESPN.; "2019 Team Ranking". Rivals.

== College career ==
Ellis scored a game-high 21 points on 7-of-11 shooting in a 83–78 win over NC State. He was subsequently named American Athletic Conference freshman of the week on December 2, 2019. He struggled shooting the ball in December and was relegated to a bench role. Ellis averaged eight points and 3.3 rebounds per game as a freshman. On November 25, 2020, Ellis scored a career-high 24 points in a game against Saint Mary's. On March 31, 2021, Ellis entered the transfer portal. On April 12, he announced that he would transfer to USC. Ellis was named Honorable Mention All-Pac-12 as a junior.

== Professional career ==
=== Stockton Kings (2024–2025) ===
After going undrafted in the 2024 NBA draft, Ellis joined the Sacramento Kings for the 2024 NBA Summer League and on September 16, he signed with them. However, he was waived on October 18. On October 27, he joined the Stockton Kings.

=== Noblesville Boom (2025) ===
On March 6, 2025, Ellis was traded to the Noblesville Boom in a three–team trade that sent Kyle Mangas to the Austin Spurs.

=== Alba Berlin (2025) ===
On August 5, 2025, Ellis signed with Alba Berlin of the German Basketball Bundesliga (BBL).

=== Dubai Basketball (2025–2026) ===
On October 22, 2025, Ellis signed with Dubai Basketball of the ABA League.. On November 19th, Ellis received a Hoops Agents Player of the Week award. He had the game-high 28 points, 3 rebounds, and 6 assists. With the team victory, the team was able to maintain a perfect record.

=== Galatasaray (2026) ===
On March 16, 2026, Ellis was loaned to Galatasaray of the Turkish Basketbol Süper Ligi (BSL) until the end of the season.

== Career statistics ==
Legend
GP	Games played	GS	Games started	MPG	Minutes per game
FG%	Field goal percentage	3P%	3-point field goal percentage	FT%	Free throw percentage
RPG	Rebounds per game	APG	Assists per game	SPG	Steals per game
BPG	Blocks per game	PPG	Points per game	**Bold**	Career high

=== College ===
Year	Team	GP	GS	MPG	FG%	3P%	FT%	RPG	APG	SPG	BPG	PPG
2019–20	Memphis	31	27	24.5	.330	.324	.685	3.3	1.5	1.3	.1	8.0
2020–21	Memphis	28	15	23.4	.401	**.386**	.657	2.1	1.5	1.1	**.2**	10.2
2021–22	USC	**33**	**33**	29.8	.417	.376	.798	3.3	2.4	.8	**.2**	12.5
2022–23	USC	**33**	**33**	**33.1**	**.434**	**.386**	**.805**	**3.7**	**3.1**	**1.4**	**.2**	**17.7**
Career		125	108	27.9	.404	.372	.751	3.1	2.2	1.1	.2	12.2
