= Brice Sensabaugh =

American basketball player (born 2003)

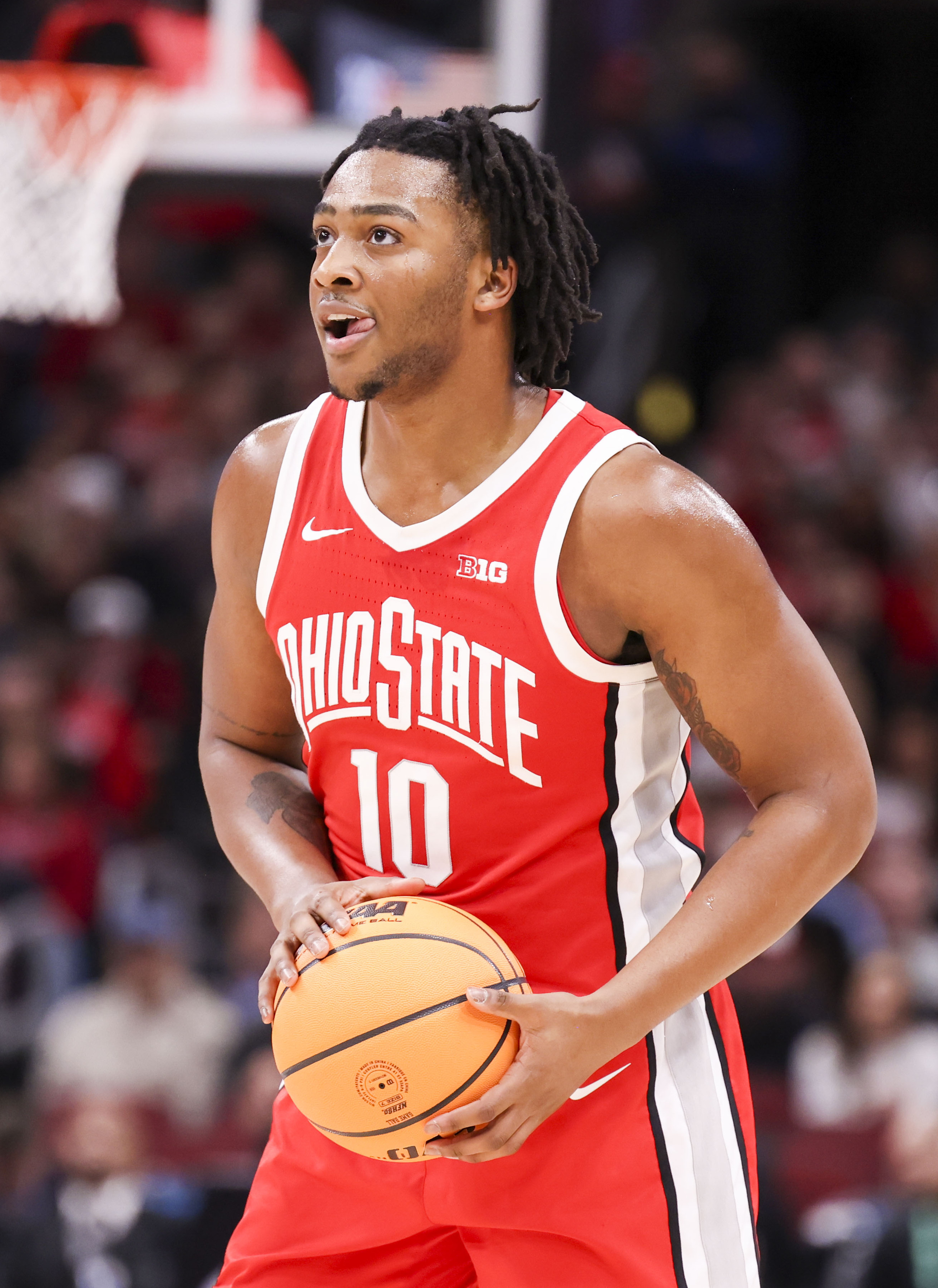
- Sensabaugh with Ohio State in 2023

No. 28 – Utah Jazz
- Position: Small forward
- League: NBA

Personal information
- Born: October 30, 2003 (age 23) Orlando, Florida, U.S.
- Listed height: 6 ft 6 in (1.98 m)
- Listed weight: 235 lb (107 kg)

Career information
- High school: Lake Highland Preparatory (Orlando, Florida)
- College: Ohio State (2022–2023)
- NBA draft: 2023: 1st round, 28th overall pick
- Drafted by: Utah Jazz
- Playing career: 2023–present

Career history
- 2023–present: Utah Jazz
- 2023–2024: →Salt Lake City Stars

Career highlights
- Third-team All-Big Ten (2023); Big Ten All-Freshman Team (2023); Florida Mr. Basketball (2022)
- Stats at NBA.com
- Stats at Basketball Reference

Brice Paul Sensabaugh (/ˈsɛnsəbɔː/ SEN-sə-baw; born October 30, 2003) is an American professional basketball player for the Utah Jazz of the National Basketball Association (NBA). He played college basketball for the Ohio State Buckeyes.

== Early life and high school career ==
Sensabaugh was born in Orlando, Florida where he attended Lake Highland Preparatory School. He was the team's leading scorer as a sophomore but missed his entire junior season due to a meniscus injury. Sensabaugh averaged 25.1 points, 7.2 rebounds and 1.5 assists per game as a senior and was named Florida Mr. Basketball. He was rated a four-star recruit and committed to playing college basketball for Ohio State over offers from Alabama, Georgia Tech and Florida. After graduating from high school, Sensabaugh played in the pro–am Kingdom Summer League in Ohio and scored 51 points in a game.

== College career ==
Sensabaugh entered his freshman season at Ohio State as a key reserve off the bench. Sensabaugh was named the Big Ten Conference Freshman of the Week for three straight weeks. He was named third team All-Big Ten and to the Big Ten All-Freshman team at the end of the regular season. After the season, Sensabaugh declared for the 2023 NBA draft.

== Professional career ==
The Utah Jazz selected Sensabaugh with the 28th overall pick in the 2023 NBA draft.

On January 14, 2026, Sensabaugh scored a career-high 43 points, including five three-pointers made, in a 126–128 loss to the Chicago Bulls. During this game, Sensabaugh also set the record for the most points off the bench in the first quarter, with 21 points.

== Career statistics ==
Legend
GP	Games played	GS	Games started	MPG	Minutes per game
FG%	Field goal percentage	3P%	3-point field goal percentage	FT%	Free throw percentage
RPG	Rebounds per game	APG	Assists per game	SPG	Steals per game
BPG	Blocks per game	PPG	Points per game	**Bold**	Career high

=== NBA ===
Year	Team	GP	GS	MPG	FG%	3P%	FT%	RPG	APG	SPG	BPG	PPG
2023–24	Utah	32	11	18.3	.390	.296	**.902**	**3.2**	1.7	.4	**.2**	7.5
2024–25	Utah	71	15	20.2	.459	**.422**	.890	3.0	1.5	.6	.1	10.9
2025–26	Utah	**75**	**22**	**23.5**	**.460**	.367	.826	3.1	**1.9**	**.7**	**.2**	**14.9**
Career		178	48	21.2	.450	.380	.826	3.1	1.7	.6	.1	12.0

=== College ===
Year	Team	GP	GS	MPG	FG%	3P%	FT%	RPG	APG	SPG	BPG	PPG
2022–23	Ohio State	33	21	24.5	.480	.405	.830	5.4	1.2	.5	.4	16.3
