= 2024 Pac-12 Conference men's basketball tournament =

American collegiate postseason event

- Classification: Division I
- Season: 2023–24
- Teams: 12
- Site: T-Mobile Arena; Paradise, Nevada
- Champions: Oregon (6th title)
- Winning coach: Dana Altman (4th title)
- MVP: N'Faly Dante (Oregon)
- Attendance: 76,101 (total); 12,912 (championship)
- Television: Pac-12 Network; FOX; FS1

2023–24 Pac-12 Conference men's basketball standings
	Conf.				Overall
Team	W		L	PCT	W		L	PCT
No. 11 Arizona	15	–	5	.750	27	–	9	.750
No. 23 Washington State	14	–	6	.700	25	–	10	.714
Colorado	13	–	7	.650	26	–	11	.703
Oregon †	12	–	8	.600	24	–	12	.667
UCLA	10	–	10	.500	16	–	17	.485
Utah	9	–	11	.450	22	–	15	.595
California	9	–	11	.450	13	–	19	.406
Washington	9	–	11	.450	17	–	15	.531
USC	8	–	12	.400	15	–	18	.455
Stanford	8	–	12	.400	14	–	18	.438
Arizona State	8	–	12	.400	14	–	18	.438
Oregon State	5	–	15	.250	13	–	19	.406
† 2024 Pac-12 tournament winner Rankings from AP Poll

The 2024 Pac-12 Conference men's basketball tournament (branded as the 2024 Pac-12 Men's Basketball Tournament presented by Acura for sponsorship reasons) was a postseason men's basketball tournament for the Pac-12 Conference held March 13–16, 2024, at T-Mobile Arena on the Las Vegas Strip in Paradise, Nevada. The winner of the tournament, Oregon, received the conference's automatic bid to the NCAA tournament. Following conference realignments in which the Pac-12 lost most of the teams except for Washington State and Oregon State, there were no men's basketball conference tournaments in 2025 and 2026. The conference planned to play a 2027 tournament.

== Seeds ==
The bracket was set on in March 9, 2024. All 12 schools were scheduled to participate in the tournament. The seedings were determined upon completion of the regular season play. The winning percentage of the teams in conference play determined tournament seedings. There are tiebreakers in place to seed teams with identical records. The top four teams receive a bye to the quarterfinals. Tie-breaking procedures for determining all tournament seeding is:

- For two-team tie:
1. Results of head-to-head competition during the regular season.
2. Each team's record (won-lost percentage) vs. the team occupying the highest position in the final regular standings, and then continuing down through the standings until one team gains an advantage. When arriving at another group of tied teams while comparing records, use each team's record (won-lost percentage) against the collective tied teams as a group (prior to that group's own tie-breaking procedure), rather than the performance against individual tied teams.
3. Won-lost percentage against all Division I opponents.
4. Coin toss conducted by the Commissioner or designee.
- For multiple-team tie:
1. Results (won-lost percentage) of collective head-to-head competition during the regular season among the tied teams.
2. If more than two teams are still tied, each of the tied team's record (won-lost percentage) vs. the team occupying the highest position in the final regular season standings, and then continuing down through the standings, eliminating teams with inferior records, until one team gains an advantage.
  When arriving at another group of tied teams while comparing records, use each team's record (won-lost percentage) against the collective tied teams as a group (prior to that group's own tie-breaking procedure), rather than the performance against individual tied teams. After one team has an advantage and is seeded, all remaining teams in the multiple-team tie-breaker will repeat the multiple-team tie-breaking procedure. If at any point the multiple-team tie is reduced to two teams, the two-team tie-breaking procedure will be applied.
3. Won-lost percentage against all Division I opponents.
4. Coin toss conducted by the Commissioner or designee.

Seed	School	Conference	Overall	Tiebreak 1	Tiebreak 2	Tiebreak 3
1	Arizona†#	15–5	24–7	–	–	–
2	Washington State#	14–6	23–8	–	–	–
3	Colorado#	13–7	22–9	–	–	–
4	Oregon#	12–8	20–11	–	–	–
5	UCLA	10–10	15–16	–	–	–
6	Utah	9–11	18–13	1–0 vs California, 1–1 vs Washington	–	–
7	California	9–11	13–18	0–1 vs Utah, 1–1 vs Washington	1–1 vs Colorado	–
8	Washington	9–11	17–14	1–1 vs California, 1–1 vs Utah	0–2 vs Colorado	–
9	USC	8–12	14–17	1–1 Arizona State, 1–1 vs Stanford	1–1 vs Arizona	3–1 vs California, UCLA & Utah
10	Stanford	8–12	13–17	1–1 vs Arizona State, 1–1 vs USC	1–1 vs Arizona	3–3 vs California, UCLA & Utah
11	Arizona State	8–12	14–17	1–1 vs Stanford, 1–1 vs USC	0–2 vs Arizona	–
12	Oregon State	5–15	13–18	–	–	–
† – Pac-12 Conference regular season champions # – Received a first round bye in the conference tournament. Rankings from AP poll

== Schedule ==
Game	Time	Matchup	Score	Television	Attendance
First round – Wednesday, March 13
1	12:00 p.m.	No. 8 Washington vs. No. 9 USC	74−80	Pac-12 Network	10,050
2	2:30 p.m.	No. 5 UCLA vs. No. 12 Oregon State	67−57	Pac-12 Network	10,050
3	6:00 p.m.	No. 7 California vs. No. 10 Stanford (rivalry)	76−87^{OT}	Pac-12 Network	10,133
4	8:30 p.m.	No. 6 Utah vs. No. 11 Arizona State	90−57	Pac-12 Network	10,133
Quarterfinals – Thursday, March 14
5	12:00 p.m.	No. 1 Arizona vs. No. 9 USC	70−49	Pac-12 Network	14,076
6	2:30 p.m.	No. 4 Oregon vs. No. 5 UCLA	68−66	Pac-12 Network	14,076
7	6:00 p.m.	No. 2 Washington State vs. No. 10 Stanford	79−62	Pac-12 Network	11,428
8	8:30 p.m.	No. 3 Colorado vs. No. 6 Utah	72−58	FS1	11,428
Semifinals – Friday, March 15
9	5:00 p.m.	No. 1 Arizona vs. No. 4 Oregon	59–67	Pac-12 Network	17,502
10	7:30 p.m.	No. 2 Washington State vs. No. 3 Colorado	52–58	FS1	17,502
Championship – Saturday, March 16
11	6:00 p.m.	No. 4 Oregon vs No. 3 Colorado	75–68	FOX	12,912
Game times in PT. Rankings denote tournament seed.

== Bracket ==
First round Wednesday, March 13
8	Washington	74
9	USC	80
5	UCLA	67
12	Oregon State	57
7	California	76
10	Stanford	87*
6	Utah	90
11	Arizona State	57

Quarterfinals; Thursday, March 14
1	Arizona	70
9	USC	49
4	Oregon	68
5	UCLA	66
2	Washington State	79
10	Stanford	62
3	Colorado	72
6	Utah	58

Semifinals; Friday, March 15
1	Arizona	59
4	Oregon	67
2	Washington State	52
3	Colorado	58

Championship; Saturday, March 16
4	Oregon	75
3	Colorado	68

* denotes overtime period

== Game statistics ==
=== First round ===
Pac-12 Network

March 13
12:00 p.m.

Box Score

No. 8 Washington 74, No. 9 USC 80
Scoring by half: 42−37, 29−43
Pts: Sahvir Wheeler, 20; Rebs: Keion Brooks Jr., 8 Asts: Sahvir Wheeler, 7	Pts: Boogie Ellis, 25; Rebs: Kobe Johnson, 8 Asts: Isaiah Collier, 7

T-Mobile Arena
Paradise, NV
Attendance: 10,050
Referees: Tony Padilla, Chance Moore, Justin Shamion

Pac-12 Network

March 13
2:30 p.m.

Box Score

No. 5 UCLA 67, No. 12 Oregon State 57
Scoring by half: 34−22, 35−33
Pts: Dylan Andrews, 31; Rebs: Lazar Stefanovic, 9 Asts: Dylan Andrews, 4	Pts: Jordan Pope, 16; Rebs: Justin Rochelin, 7 Asts: Jordan Pope, 3

T-Mobile Arena
Paradise, NV
Attendance: 10,050
Referees: Michael Irving, Deldre Carr, Matthew Rukasin

Pac-12 Network

March 13
6:00 p.m.

Box Score

No. 7 California 76, No. 10 Stanford 87 (OT)
Scoring by half: 45−34, 24−35 Overtime: 7−18
Pts: Jalen Cone, 19; Rebs: Fardaws Aimaq, 9 Asts: Jaylon Tyson, 8	Pts: Maxime Raynaud, 22; Rebs: Maxime Raynaud, 14; Asts: Benny Gealer, 5

T-Mobile Arena
Paradise, NV
Attendance: 10,133
Referees: Randy McCall, Mike Littlewood, De Selle Dean

Pac-12 Network

March 13
8:30 p.m.

Box Score

No. 6 Utah 90, No. 11 Arizona State 57
Scoring by half: 47−22, 43−35
Pts: Cole Bajema, 22; Rebs: tied, 10; Asts: Deivon Smith, 9	Pts: Frankie Collins, 20; Rebs: Bryant Selebangue, 8 Asts: Jamiya Neal, 2

T-Mobile Arena
Paradise, NV
Attendance: 10,133
Referees: Gregory Nixon, Kevin Brill, Michael Greenstein

=== Quarterfinals ===
Pac-12 Network

March 14
12:00 p.m.

Box Score

No. 1 Arizona 70, No. 9 USC 49
Scoring by half: 28−16, 42−33
Pts: KJ Lewis, 15; Rebs: Oumar Ballo, 10; Asts: Tied, 3	Pts: Kobe Johnson, 14; Rebs: Kobe Johnson, 8 Asts: Isaiah Collier, 3

T-Mobile Arena
Paradise, NV
Attendance: 14,076
Referees: Mike Littlewood, Deldre Carr, Jason Garretson

Pac-12 Network

March 14
2:30 p.m.

Box Score

No. 4 Oregon 68, No. 5 UCLA 66
Scoring by half: 29−34, 39−32
Pts: N'Faly Dante, 22; Rebs: Jermiane Couisnard, 7 Asts: Jermiane Couisnard, 6	Pts: Dylan Andrews, 24; Rebs: Lazar Stefanovic, 6 Asts: Dylan Andrews, 2

T-Mobile Arena
Paradise, NV
Attendance: 14,076
Referees: Tony Padilla, Brooks Wells, Michael Mojica

Pac-12 Network

March 14
6:00 p.m.

Box Score

No. 2 Washington State 79, No. 10 Stanford 62
Scoring by half: 45−29, 34−33
Pts: Isaac Jones, 16; Rebs: Tied, 6 Asts: Jaylen Wells, 5	Pts: Spencer Jones, 22; Rebs: Brandon Angel, 6 Asts: Brandon Angel, 3

T-Mobile Arena
Paradise, NV
Attendance: 11,428
Referees: Verne Harris, Michael Greenstein, De Selle Dean

FS1

March 14
8:30 p.m.

Box Score

No. 3 Colorado 72, No. 6 Utah 58
Scoring by half: 33−30, 39−28
Pts: KJ Simpson, 18; Rebs: Eddie Lampkin Jr., 12; Asts: KJ Simpson, 6	Pts: Tied, 6 Rebs: Tied, 6 Asts: Deivon Smith, 5

T-Mobile Arena
Paradise, NV
Attendance: 11,428
Referees: Michael Reed, Deron White, DG Nelson

=== Semifinals ===
Pac-12 Network

March 15
6:00 p.m.

Box Score

No. 1 Arizona 59, No. 4 Oregon 67
Scoring by half: 33−23, 26−44
Pts: Oumar Ballo, 14; Rebs: Oumar Ballo, 12; Asts: Tied, 3	Pts: Jackson Shelstad, 21; Rebs: N’Faly Dante, 10; Asts: Jermaine Couisnard, 7

T-Mobile Arena
Paradise, NV
Attendance: 17,502
Referees: Tony Padilla, Brooks Wells, Deldre Carr

FS1

March 15
8:30 p.m.

Box Score

No. 2 Washington State 52, No. 3 Colorado 58
Scoring by half: 23−27, 23−31
Pts: KJ Simpson, 16; Rebs: KJ Simpson, 7 Asts: J'Vonne Hadley, 4	Pts: Isaac Jones, 13; Rebs: Jaylen Wells, 7 Asts: Jaylen Wells, 4

T-Mobile Arena
Paradise, NV
Attendance: 17,502
Referees: Gregory Nixon, Verne Harris, Michael Greenstein

=== Championship ===
FOX

March 16
7:30 p.m.

Box Score

No. 4 Oregon 75, No. 3 Colorado 68
Scoring by half: 33−30, 42−38
Pts: N'faly Dante, 25; Rebs: N'faly Dante, 9 Asts: Jermaine Couisnard, 8	Pts: K.J. Simpson, 23; Rebs: J'Vonne Hadley, 7 Asts: Tristan da Silva, 5

T-Mobile Arena
Paradise, NV
Attendance: 12,912
Referees: Tony Padilla, Mike Reed, Marques Pettigrew

== Awards and honors ==
=== Team and tournament leaders ===
Team	Points		Rebounds		Assists		Steals		Blocks		Minutes	
Arizona	Oumar Ballo	24	Oumar Ballo	25	Kylan Boswell	8	Kylan Boswell	5	Oumar Ballo	8	Pelle Larsson	64
Arizona State	Frankie Collins	20	Bryant Selebangue	8	Jamiya Neal	2	Bryant Selebangue	3	None	0	Frankie Collins	35
California	Jalen Cone	19	Fardaws Aimaq	9	Jaylon Tyson	8	Tied	2	Jalen Celestine	1	Tied	39
Colorado	K. J. Simpson	57	K. J. Simpson	23	K. J. Simpson	13	J'Vonne Hadley	4	Tristan da Silva	1	KJ Simpson	117
Oregon	N'Faly Dante	61	N’Faly Dante	25	Jermaine Couisnard	21	N'Faly Dante	8	N'Faly Dante	5	Jackson Shelstad	110
Oregon State	Jordan Pope	16	Justin Rochelin	7	Jordan Pope	3	Jordan Pope	2	KC Ibekwe	2	Dexter Akanno	38
Stanford	Spencer Jones	42	Maxime Raynaud	18	Benny Gealer	7	Spencer Jones	7	Tied	1	Spencer Jones	75
UCLA	Dylan Andrews	68	Lazar Stefanovic	15	Dylan Andrews	6	Dylan Andrews	4	Aday Mara	3	Dylan Andrews	39
USC	Boogie Ellis	38	Kobe Johnson	16	Isaiah Collier	10	Boogie Ellis	5	Joshua Morgan	6	Isaiah Collier	71
Utah	Cole Bajema	32	Deivon Smith	16	Deivon Smith	14	Keba Keita	4	Keba Keita	2	Cole Bajema	61
Washington	Sahvir Wheeler	20	Keion Brooks Jr.	8	Sahvir Wheeler	7	Keion Brooks Jr.	3	None	0	Keion Brooks Jr.	38
Washington State	Isaac Jones	29	Jaylen Wells	13	Myles Rice	10	Myles Rice	5	Kymany Houinsou	3	Andrej Jakimovski	73

=== All-Tournament Team ===
Name	Pos.	Height	Weight	Year	Team
Oumar Ballo	Center	7−0	260	RS-Junior	Arizona
Jermaine Couisnard	Shooting guard	6−4	210	Graduate Senior	Oregon
N'Faly Dante	Center	6−11	265	Senior	Oregon
Tristan da Silva	Power forward	6−9	220	Senior	Colorado
K. J. Simpson	Point guard	6−9	190	Junior	Colorado

=== Most Outstanding Player ===
Name	Pos.	Height	Weight	Year	Team
N'Faly Dante	Center	6−11	265	Senior	Oregon

== See also ==
- 2024 Pac-12 Conference women's basketball tournament
