= 2023–24 Pac-12 Conference men's basketball season =

2023–24 Pac–12 men's basketball season
- League: NCAA Division I
- Sport: Basketball
- Teams: 12
- Total attendance: 1,391,764
- TV partner(s): ESPN, ESPN2, ESPNU, ESPN+, Pac-12 Network, Fox Sports 1, FOX, CBS, CBSSN, TNT, TruTV, FloHoops, SECN, MWSN, Peacock

Regular season
- Season champions: Arizona Wildcats
- Season MVP: Caleb Love, Arizona Wildcats
- Top scorer: KJ Simpson Colorado

Pac-12 tournament
- Champions: Oregon Ducks
- Runners-up: Colorado Buffaloes
- Most Outstanding Player: N'Faly Dante, Oregon Ducks

Pac-12 men's basketball seasons
- ← 2022–23 2026–27 →

2023–24 Pac-12 Conference men's basketball standings
	Conf.				Overall
Team	W		L	PCT	W		L	PCT
No. 11 Arizona	15	–	5	.750	27	–	9	.750
No. 23 Washington State	14	–	6	.700	25	–	10	.714
Colorado	13	–	7	.650	26	–	11	.703
Oregon †	12	–	8	.600	24	–	12	.667
UCLA	10	–	10	.500	16	–	17	.485
Utah	9	–	11	.450	22	–	15	.595
California	9	–	11	.450	13	–	19	.406
Washington	9	–	11	.450	17	–	15	.531
USC	8	–	12	.400	15	–	18	.455
Stanford	8	–	12	.400	14	–	18	.438
Arizona State	8	–	12	.400	14	–	18	.438
Oregon State	5	–	15	.250	13	–	19	.406
† 2024 Pac-12 tournament winner Rankings from AP Poll

The 2023–24 Pac-12 Conference men's basketball season began with practices in October followed by the 2023–24 NCAA Division I men's basketball season, which started November 6, 2023. Conference play will begin on December 27, 2023. This is the twelfth season under the Pac–12 Conference name and the 65th since the current Pac−12 charter was established in 1959. Because the Pac-12 includes the history of the Pacific Coast Conference, which existed from 1915 to 1959, in its own history, this was the 109th season of Pac-12 men's basketball.

It was the final season of Pac-12 competition in the conference's then-current form, with UCLA, USC, Oregon & Washington moving to the Big Ten Conference; Colorado returning to its previous home of the Big 12 Conference, with Utah, Arizona & Arizona State following suit; California and Stanford moving to the Atlantic Coast Conference, and Oregon State and Washington State moving to the West Coast Conference (WCC) after the 2023–24 academic year. With Boise State, Colorado State, Fresno State, Gonzaga, San Diego State, Texas State, and Utah State joining the Pac-12 in 2026, coinciding with the end of Oregon State's and Washington State's WCC affiliation contract, Pac-12 play will resume in 2026–27.

The Pac-12 tournament took place on March 13−16, 2024 at the T-Mobile Arena on the Las Vegas Strip, just outside the city limits of Las Vegas.

== Pre-season ==
=== Recruiting classes ===
Rankings
Team	ESPN	Rivals	On3 Recruits	247 Sports	Signees
Arizona	—	No. 45	No. 69	No. 72	4
Arizona State	―	No. 37	No. 64	No. 49	2
California	―	No. 51	No. 84	No. 58	2
Colorado	―	No. 13	No. 28	No. 25	4
Oregon	No. 6	No. 6	No. 3	No. 11	3
Oregon State	―	―	No. 114	No. 119	3
Stanford	No. 18	No. 19	No. 33	No. 33	3
UCLA	No. 12	No. 16	No. 15	No. 13	7
USC	No. 13	No. 2	No. 4	No. 3	3
Utah	―	No. 57	No. 143	No. 86	3
Washington	―	No. 71	No. 42	No. 67	2
Washington State	―	―	No. 54	No. 55	4

=== Preseason watchlists ===
Below is a table of notable preseason watch lists.

Player	Wooden	Naismith	Cousy	West	Erving	Malone	Abdul-Jabbar
Oumar Ballo	✓	✓					✓
Adem Bona	✓	✓				✓	
Branden Carlson							✓
Isaiah Collier	✓	✓	✓				
N'Faly Dante	✓						✓
Boogie Ellis	✓	✓		✓			
Keshad Johnson						✓	
Caleb Love		✓		✓			
Aday Mara							✓
Tristan da Silva	✓	✓				✓	
Jaylon Tyson					✓		

=== Preseason All-American teams ===
Player	CBS	Fox Sports
Oumar Ballo		3rd
Boogie Ellis	2nd	3rd

=== Preseason polls ===
	247 Sports	AP	Blue Ribbon	CBS Sports	Coaches	ESPN	Fox Sports	KenPom	NCAA Sports	Sports; Illustrated
Arizona	No. 18	No. 12	No. 15	No. 17	No. 11	No. 11	No. 17	No. 6	No. 16	No. 15
Arizona State	–	–	–	–	–	–	–	No. 81	–	–
California	–	–	–	–	–	–	–	No. 146	–	–
Colorado	No. 24	–	No. 23	–	–	–	–	No. 28	No. 34	–
Oregon	–	–	–	–	–	–	–	No. 41	–	–
Oregon State	–	–	–	–	–	–	–	No. 175	–	–
Stanford	–	–	–	–	–	–	–	No. 42	–	–
UCLA	–	–	–	–	No. 25	–	–	No. 26	No. 29	No. 22
USC	No. 23	No. 21	No. 21	No. 12	No. 22	No. 21	No. 24	No. 21	No. 12	No. 13
Utah	–	–	–	–	–	–	–	No. 52	–	–
Washington	–	–	–	–	–	–	–	No. 78	–	–
Washington State	–	–	–	–	–	–	–	No. 84	–	–

=== Pac-12 media days ===
The Pac-12 conducted its 2023 Pac-12 media days in Las Vegas, Nevada on October 11, 2023, on the Pac-12 Network.

The teams and representatives in respective order are as follows:

- Arizona – Tommy Lloyd (HC), Oumar Ballo & Pelle Larsson
- Arizona State – Bobby Hurley (HC), Frankie Collins & Jamiya Neal
- California – Mark Madsen (HC), Keonte Kennedy & Grant Newell
- Colorado – Tad Boyle (HC), Tristan da Silva & KJ Simpson
- Oregon – Dana Altman (HC), Jermaine Couisnard & N'Faly Dante
- Oregon State – Wayne Tinkle (HC), Tyler Bilodeau & Jordan Pope
- Stanford – Jerod Haase (HC), Brandon Angel & Spencer Jones
- UCLA – Mick Cronin (HC), Adem Bona & Lazar Stefanovic
- USC – Andy Enfield (HC), Boogie Ellis & Kobe Johnson
- Utah – Craig Smith (HC), Branden Carlson & Rollie Worster
- Washington – Mike Hopkins (HC), Keion Brooks Jr. & Sahvir Wheeler
- Washington State – Kyle Smith (HC), Andrej Jakimovski & Joseph Yesufu

Men's Basketball Preseason Poll
Place	Team	Points	First place votes
1.	Arizona	303	18
2.	USC	264	4
3.	UCLA	249	4
4.	Oregon	228	—
5.	Colorado	210	—
6.	Arizona State	148	—
7.	Utah	139	—
8.	Stanford	131	—
9.	Washington	108	—
10.	Washington State	94	—
11.	California	67	—
12.	Oregon State	42	—

First-place votes shown in parentheses.

=== Pac-12 Preseason All-Conference ===
First Team

Name	School	Pos.	Yr.	Ht., Wt.	Hometown (Last School)
Oumar Ballo	Arizona	C	(redshirt) Sr.	7′ 0″, 260	Koulikoro, Mali (Gonzaga)
Adem Bona	UCLA	C/F	So.	6′ 10″, 245	Ebonyi, Nigeria (Prolific Prep)
Keion Brooks Jr.	Washington	F	Gr.	6′ 7″, 210	Fort Wayne, IN (La Lumiere School)
Branden Carlson	Utah	C	Gr.	7′ 0″, 225	South Jordan, UT(Bingham HS)
Isaiah Collier	USC	G	Fr.	6′ 5″, 210	Atlanta, GA (Wheeler HS)
N'Faly Dante	Oregon	C	Sr.	6′ 11″, 245	Bamako, Mali (Christian Academy)
Tristan da Silva	Colorado	F	Sr.	6′ 9″, 230	Munich, Germany (Ludwigsgymnasium Munich)
Boogie Ellis	USC	G	Gr.	6′ 3″, 190	San Diego, CA (Mission Bay HS)
Spencer Jones	Stanford	F	Gr.	6′ 7″, 225	Roeland Park, KS (Bishop Miege)
KJ Simpson	Colorado	G	Jr.	6′ 2″, 190	West Hills, CA (Chaminade Prep)

Second Team

Name	School	Pos.	Yr.	Ht., Wt.	Hometown (Last School)
Fardaws Aimaq	California	F	Gr.	6′ 11″, 245	Vancouver, BC (Texas Tech)
Kylan Boswell	Arizona	G	So.	6′ 2″, 195	Champaign, Ill (Compass Prep)
Kobe Johnson	USC	G	Jr.	6′ 6″, 230	Milwaukee, WI (Nicolet HS)
Caleb Love	Arizona	G	Sr.	6′ 4″, 200	St. Louis, MO (North Carolina)
Jordan Pope	Oregon State	G	So.	6′ 2″, 165	Oakley, CA (Prolific Prep)

Honorable Mention:
Arizona: Pelle Larsson Sr.
Colorado: Cody Williams, Fr.
Oregon: Kwame Evans Jr., Fr.
UCLA: Aday Mara, Fr.

=== Midseason watchlists ===
Below is a table of notable midseason watch lists.

Player	Wooden	Naismith	Naismith DPOY	Robertson	West	Erving	Malone	Abdul-Jabbar	Olson
Adem Bona			✓						
Keion Brooks Jr.						✓			
Boogie Ellis					✓				
Keshad Johnson							✓		
Caleb Love	✓	✓			✓				✓
KJ Simpson	✓	✓							
Jaylon Tyson									

=== Final watchlists ===
Below is a table of notable year end watch lists.

Player	Wooden	Naismith	Naismith DPOY	Robertson	West	Erving	Malone	Abdul-Jabbar	Olson
Caleb Love	✓	✓			✓				
Keion Brooks Jr.						✓			

== Regular season ==
The Schedule will be released in late October. Before the season, it was announced that for the seventh consecutive season, all regular season conference games and conference tournament games would be broadcast nationally by ESPN Inc. family of networks including ABC, ESPN, ESPN2 and ESPNU, FOX and FS1, CBS Sports, and the Pac-12 Network.

=== Multi-team tournaments ===
Team	Tournament	Finish
Arizona	−	−
Arizona State	Wooden Legacy	3rd
California	SoCal Challenge	4th
Colorado	Sunshine Slam	2nd
Oregon	Emerald Coast Classic	4th
Oregon State	NIT Season Tip-Off	4th
Stanford	Battle 4 Atlantis	8th
UCLA	Maui Invitational	6th
USC	Rady Children's Invitational	2nd
Utah	Charleston Classic	4th
Washington	Roman Main Event	2nd
Washington State	Hall of Fame Tip-Off	3rd

=== Pac-12/SWAC Legacy Series ===
On September 20, 2021, the Pac-12 and Southwestern Athletic Conference debuted the Pac-12/SWAC Legacy Series, an educational and basketball scheduling partnership between the two collegiate athletics conferences, to tip off the 2023–24 season. The Legacy Series incorporated an array of educational opportunities for competing teams and student-athletes featuring expert speakers and prominent alumni, community engagement, campus traditions, historic site visits, and book/film discussions.

Date	Visitor	Home	Site	Significance	Score	Conference record
Nov. 10	Grambling State	Colorado	Coors Event Center ● Boulder, CO	Pac−12/SWAC Legacy Series	Colorado 95−63	1−0
Nov. 10	Prairie View A&M	Washington State	Beasley Coliseum ● Pullman, WA	Pac−12/SWAC Legacy Series	Washington State 83−65	2−0
Nov. 11	Texas Southern	Arizona State	Desert Financial Arena ● Tempe, AZ	Pac−12/SWAC Legacy Series	Arizona State 63−52	3−0
Nov. 13	Southern	No. 3 Arizona	McKale Center ● Tucson, AZ	Pac−12/SWAC Legacy Series	Arizona 97−59	4−0
Nov. 20	Oregon	Florida A&M	Al Lawson Center ● Tallahassee, FL	Pac−12/SWAC Legacy Series	Oregon 67−54	5−0
Dec. 19	USC	Alabama State	Dunn-Oliver Acadome ● Montgomery, AL	Pac−12/SWAC Legacy Series	USC 79−59	6−0

Team rankings are reflective of AP poll when the game was played, not current or final ranking

== Records vs other conferences ==
The Pac-12 has a record of 87–46 in non-conference play for the 2023–24 season. Records shown for regular season only.

Regular season

Power 6 Conferences
Conference	Record
ACC	3–4
Big East	2–4
Big Ten	3–5
Big 12	2–5
SEC	3–6
Combined	13–24

Other Conferences
Conference	Record
America East	1–0
American	2–2
ASUN	2–0
Atlantic 10	2–0
Big Sky	14–1
Big South	0–0
Big West	11–3
Colonial	1–0
Conference USA	2–1
Horizon	2–0
Independents/Non-Division I	2–0
Ivy League	1–0
Metro Atlantic	1–0
Mid-American	1–0
Mid-Eastern Athletic	1–0
Missouri Valley	1–1
Mountain West	1–7
Northeast	2–0
Ohio Valley	1–0
Patriot	2–0
Southern	0–0
Southland	0–0
Southwestern Athletic	7–0
Summit	1–0
Sun Belt	2–0
West Coast	6–7
Western Athletic	8–0
Combined	74–22

Postseason

Power 6 Conferences
Conference	Record
ACC	0–1
Big East	0–2
Big Ten	1–0
Big 12	0–1
SEC	2–0
Combined	2–4

Other Conferences
Conference	Record
Atlantic 10	2–0
Big West	2–0
Missouri Valley	1–1
Mountain West	1–0
Combined	9–5

=== Record against ranked non-conference opponents ===
This is a list of games against ranked opponents only (rankings from the AP Poll at time of the game):

Date	Visitor	Home	Site	Significance	Score	Conference record
Nov. 10	No. 12 Arizona	No. 2 Duke	Cameron Indoor Stadium ● Durham, NC	−	Arizona 78−73	1−0
Nov. 17	No. 6 Houston	Utah†	TD Arena ● Charleston, SC	Charleston Classic	Houston 76−66	1−1
Nov. 20	No. 4 Marquette	UCLA†	Stan Sheriff Center ● Honolulu, HI	Maui Invitational	Marquette 71−69	1−2
Nov. 22	No. 13 Baylor	Oregon State†	Barclays Center ● Brooklyn, NY	NIT Season Tip-Off	Baylor 88−72	1−3
Nov. 22	No. 20 Arkansas	Stanford†	Imperial Arena ● Nassau, Bahamas	Battle 4 Atlantis	Arkansas 77−74^{2OT}	1−4
Nov. 22	No. 11 Gonzaga	UCLA†	Stan Sheriff Center ● Honolulu, HI	Maui Invitational	Gonzaga 69−65	1−5
Nov. 23	No. 21 Michigan State	No. 3 Arizona†	Acrisure Arena ● Palm Springs, CA	Acrisure Classic	Arizona 74−68	2−5
Nov. 25	No. 21 Alabama	Oregon†	Raider Arena ● Destin, FL	Emerald Coast Classic	Alabama 99−91	2−6
Nov. 29	Colorado	No. 20 Colorado State	Moby Arena ● Fort Collins, CO	Rocky Mountain Showdown	Colorado State 88−83	2−7
Dec. 2	No. 20 Colorado State	Washington†	MGM Grand Garden Arena ● Paradise, NV	Legends of Basketball Las Vegas Invitational	Colorado State 86−81	2−8
Dec. 2	No. 11 Gonzaga	USC†	MGM Grand Garden Arena ● Paradise, NV	Legends of Basketball Las Vegas Invitational	Gonzaga 89−76	2−9
Dec. 9	No. 23 Wisconsin	No. 1 Arizona	McKale Center ● Tucson, AZ	−	Arizona 98−73	3−9
Dec. 9	No. 14 BYU	Utah	Jon M. Huntsman Center ● Salt Lake City, UT	Holy War	Utah 73−69	4−9
Dec. 9	No. 7 Gonzaga	Washington	Alaska Airlines Arena ● Seattle, WA	Rivalry	Washington 78−73	5−9
Dec. 10	No. 15 Miami	Colorado†	Barclays Center ● Brooklyn, NY	NABC Brooklyn Showcase	Colorado 90−63	6−9
Dec. 16	No. 3 Purdue	No. 1 Arizona†	Gainbridge Fieldhouse ● Indianapolis, IN	Indy Classic	Purdue 92−84	6−10
Dec. 23	No. 14 Florida Atlantic	No. 4 Arizona†	T-Mobile Arena ● Paradise, NV	Desert Holiday Classic	Florida Atlantic 95−95^{2 OT}	6−11
Mar. 21	No. 16 South Carolina	Oregon†	PPG Paints Arena ● Pittsburgh, PA	2024 NCAA Tournament	Oregon 87−73	7−11
Mar. 23	No. 4 Iowa State	Washington State†	CHI Health Center Omaha ● Omaha, NE	2024 NCAA Tournament	Iowa State 67−56	7−12
Mar. 23	No. 11 Creighton	Oregon†	PPG Paints Arena ● Pittsburgh, PA	2024 NCAA Tournament	Creighton 86−73	7−13
Mar. 24	No. 11 Marquette	Colorado†	Gainbridge Fieldhouse ● Indianapolis, IN	2024 NCAA Tournament	Marquette 81−77	7−14

† denotes neutral site game

=== Conference schedule ===
This table summarizes the head-to-head results between teams in conference play.

	Arizona	ASU	California	Colorado	Oregon	OSU	Stanford	UCLA	USC	Utah	Washington	WSU
vs. Arizona	–	0–2	0–2	0–2	0–2	1–0	1–1	0–2	1–1	0–2	0–1	2–0
vs. Arizona State	2–0	–	1–1	1–1	1–0	1–1	1–1	2–0	1–1	0–2	2–0	0–1
vs. California	2–0	1–1	–	1–1	1–1	0–1	1–1	1–1	1–1	1–0	1–1	1–1
vs. Colorado	2–0	1–1	1–1	–	0–2	0–2	0–1	1–0	0–2	1–1	0–2	1–1
vs. Oregon	2–0	0–1	1–1	2–0	–	0–2	0–1	1–1	0–2	1–1	0–2	1–1
vs. Oregon State	0–1	1–1	1–0	2–0	2–0	–	1–1	2–0	1–1	1–1	2–0	2–0
vs. Stanford	1–1	1–1	1–1	1–0	1–0	1–1	–	1–1	1–1	1–1	1–1	2–0
vs. UCLA	2–0	0–2	1–1	0–1	1–1	0–2	1–1	–	1–1	2–0	1–1	0–1
vs. USC	1–1	1–1	1–1	2–0	2–0	1–1	1–1	1–1	–	0–1	0–1	2–0
vs. Utah	2–0	2–0	0–1	1–1	1–1	1–1	1–1	0–2	1–0	–	1–1	1–1
vs. Washington	1–0	0–2	1–1	2–0	2–0	0–2	1–1	1–1	1–0	1–1	–	1–1
vs. Washington State	0–2	1–0	1–1	1–1	1–1	0–2	0–2	0–1	0–2	1–1	1–1	–
Total	15–5	8–12	9–11	13–7	12–8	5–15	8–12	10–10	8–12	9–11	9–11	14–6

Through 2024 Season

=== Points scored ===
Team	For	Against	Difference
Arizona	3,137	2,594	543
Arizona State	2,209	2,368	-159
California	2,367	2,465	-98
Colorado	2,935	2,654	281
Oregon	2,721	2,602	119
Oregon State	2,204	2,326	-122
Stanford	2,443	2,447	-4
UCLA	2,177	2,160	17
USC	2,446	2,452	-8
Utah	2,915	2,704	207
Washington	2,579	2,468	111
Washington State	2,574	2,335	239

Through 2024 Season

== Rankings ==
*AP does not release post-NCAA tournament rankings

	Improvement in ranking
	Drop in ranking
RV	Received votes but were not ranked in Top 25
NV	No votes received

Team	Poll	Pre	Wk 2	Wk 3	Wk 4	Wk 5	Wk 6	Wk 7	Wk 8	Wk 9	Wk 10	Wk 11	Wk 12	Wk 13	Wk 14	Wk 15	Wk 16	Wk 17	Wk 18	Wk 19	Wk 20	Final
Arizona	AP	12	3(3)	3(2)	2(1)	1(59)	1(62)	4	4	10	8	12	9	11	8	5	4	6	5	6	9	11
Arizona	C	11	3(3)	3(3)	2	1(26)	1(28)	4	4	10	8	13	9	12	8	6	4	7	5	7	9	12
Arizona State	AP	NV	NV	NV	NV	NV	NV	NV	NV	NV	NV	NV	NV	NV	NV	NV	NV	NV	NV	NV	NV	NV
Arizona State	C	NV	NV	NV	NV	NV	NV	NV	NV	NV	NV	NV	NV	NV	NV	NV	NV	NV	NV	NV	NV	NV
California	AP	NV	NV	NV	NV	NV	NV	NV	NV	NV	NV	NV	NV	NV	NV	NV	NV	NV	NV	NV	NV	NV
California	C	NV	NV	NV	NV	NV	NV	NV	NV	NV	NV	NV	NV	NV	NV	NV	NV	NV	NV	NV	NV	NV
Colorado	AP	RV	25	18	RV	RV	RV	RV	RV	RV	RV	NV	RV	NV	NV	NV	NV	NV	NV	RV	RV	RV
Colorado	C	RV	RV	21	RV	RV	RV	RV	RV	RV	NV	NV	NV	NV	NV	NV	NV	NV	NV	RV	RV	RV
Oregon	AP	NV	NV	NV	NV	NV	NV	NV	NV	NV	RV	RV	NV	NV	NV	NV	NV	NV	NV	NV	RV	RV
Oregon	C	RV	RV	RV	NV	NV	NV	NV	NV	NV	NV	RV	NV	NV	NV	NV	NV	NV	NV	NV	RV	RV
Oregon State	AP	NV	NV	NV	NV	NV	NV	NV	NV	NV	NV	NV	NV	NV	NV	NV	NV	NV	NV	NV	NV	NV
Oregon State	C	NV	NV	NV	NV	NV	NV	NV	NV	NV	NV	NV	NV	NV	NV	NV	NV	NV	NV	NV	NV	NV
Stanford	AP	NV	NV	NV	NV	NV	NV	NV	NV	NV	NV	NV	NV	NV	NV	NV	NV	NV	NV	NV	NV	NV
Stanford	C	NV	NV	NV	NV	NV	NV	NV	NV	NV	NV	NV	NV	NV	NV	NV	NV	NV	NV	NV	NV	NV
UCLA	AP	RV	RV	RV	RV	RV	NV	NV	NV	NV	NV	NV	NV	NV	NV	NV	NV	NV	NV	NV	NV	NV
UCLA	C	25	25т	24	RV	RV	NV	NV	NV	NV	NV	NV	NV	NV	NV	NV	NV	NV	NV	NV	NV	NV
USC	AP	21	16	23	RV	NV	NV	NV	NV	NV	NV	NV	NV	NV	NV	NV	NV	NV	NV	NV	NV	NV
USC	C	22	20	RV	RV	NV	RV	NV	NV	NV	NV	NV	NV	NV	NV	NV	NV	NV	NV	NV	NV	NV
Utah	AP	NV	NV	NV	NV	NV	RV	RV	RV	RV	RV	RV	RV	NV	NV	NV	NV	NV	NV	NV	NV	NV
Utah	C	NV	NV	NV	NV	NV	RV	RV	RV	RV	NV	NV	RV	NV	NV	NV	NV	NV	NV	NV	NV	NV
Washington	AP	NV	NV	NV	NV	NV	NV	RV	NV	NV	NV	NV	NV	NV	NV	NV	NV	NV	NV	NV	NV	NV
Washington	C	NV	NV	NV	NV	NV	NV	NV	NV	NV	NV	NV	NV	NV	NV	NV	NV	NV	NV	NV	NV	NV
Washington State	AP	NV	NV	NV	NV	NV	NV	NV	NV	NV	NV	NV	NV	NV	RV	RV	21	19	18	22	25	23
Washington State	C	NV	NV	NV	NV	NV	NV	NV	NV	NV	NV	NV	NV	NV	NV	RV	22	21	20	25	RV	24

== Head coaches ==
=== Coaching changes ===
Coach	School	Reason	Replacement
Mark Fox	California	Resigned	Mark Madsen

=== Coaches ===
Note: Stats shown are before the beginning of the season. Pac-12 records are from time at current school.

Team	Head coach	Previous job	Seasons at school	Record at school	Pac-12 record	Pac-12 titles	NCAA tournaments	NCAA Final Fours	NCAA Championships
Arizona	Tommy Lloyd	Gonzaga (assistant)	3rd	61–11 (.847)	32–8 (.800)	2	2	0	0
Arizona State	Bobby Hurley	Buffalo	8th	141–113 (.555)	71–76 (.483)	0	3	0	0
California	Mark Madsen	Utah Valley	1st	0–0 (–)	0–0 (–)	0	0	0	0
Colorado	Tad Boyle	Northern Colorado	14th	272–172 (.613)	126–1112 (.529)	0	5	0	0
Oregon	Dana Altman	Creighton	14th	321–140 (.696)	155–83 (.651)	3	7	1	0
Oregon State	Wayne Tinkle	Montana	10th	127–158 (.446)	58–110 (.345)	1	2	0	0
Stanford	Jerod Haase††	UAB	8th	112–109 (.507)	59–72 (.450)	0	0	0	0
UCLA	Mick Cronin	Cincinnati	5th	97–36 (.729)	57–19 (.750)	0	3	1	0
USC	Andy Enfield	Florida Gulf Coast	11th	205–128 (.616)	98–88 (.527)	0	4	0	0
Utah	Craig Smith	Utah State	3rd	28–35 (.444)	14–26 (.350)	0	0	0	0
Washington	Mike Hopkins†	Syracuse (assistant)	7th	101–91 (.526)	51–61 (.455)	0	1	0	0
Washington State	Kyle Smith†††	San Francisco	5th	69–61 (.531)	35–42 (.455)	0	0	0	0

Notes:
† On March 8, 2024, Washington announced Mike Hopkins would coach the remainder of the season and be relieved of his duties after the Pac-12 Tournament.
†† On March 14, 2024, Stanford fired Jerod Haase following their loss to Washington State in the Pac-12 tournament.
††† On March 25, 2024, Washington State head coach was announced as the new head basketball coach for Stanford following his exit from the NCAA Tournament.

- Pac-12 records, conference titles, etc. are from time at current school and are through the end the 2022–23 season.
- NCAA tournament appearances are from time at current school only.
- NCAA Final Fours and Championship include time at other schools.

== Postseason ==
=== Pac-12 tournament ===
The conference tournament was played March 13−16 at the T-Mobile Arena in Paradise, Nevada; the top four teams had a bye on the first day. Teams were seeded by conference record, with ties broken by record between the tied teams followed by record against the regular-season champion, if necessary.

First round Wednesday, March 13
8	Washington	74
9	USC	80
5	UCLA	67
12	Oregon State	57
7	California	76
10	Stanford	87*
6	Utah	90
11	Arizona State	57

Quarterfinals; Thursday, March 14
1	Arizona	70
9	USC	49
4	Oregon	68
5	UCLA	66
2	Washington State	79
10	Stanford	62
3	Colorado	72
6	Utah	58

Semifinals; Friday, March 15
1	Arizona	59
4	Oregon	67
2	Washington State	52
3	Colorado	58

Championship; Saturday, March 16
4	Oregon	75
3	Colorado	68

* denotes overtime period

=== NCAA tournament ===
The following teams from the conference that will be selected to participate:

Seed	Region	School	First Four	1st round	2nd round	Sweet 16	Elite Eight	Final Four	Championship
2	West	Arizona	–	defeated No. 15 Long Beach State 85–65	defeated No. 7 Dayton 78–68	lost to No. 6 Clemson 72–77	–	–	–
7	East	Washington State	–	defeated No. 10 Drake 66–61	lost to No. 2 Iowa State 56–67	–	–	–	–
10	South	Colorado	defeated No. 10 Boise State 60–53	defeated No. 7 Florida 102–100	lost to No. 2 Marquette 77–81	–	–	–	–
11	Midwest	Oregon	–	defeated No. 6 South Carolina 87–73	lost to No. 3 Creighton 73–86 ^{2OT}	–	–	–	–
	Bids	W-L (%):	1–0 (1.000)	4–0 (1.000)	1–3 (.250)	0–1 (.000)	0–0 (–)	0–0 (–)	TOTAL: 6–4 (.600)

=== National Invitation Tournament ===
The following team from the conference that will be selected to participate:

Seed	Bracket	School	First Round	Second Round	Quarterfinals	Semifinals	Finals
2	Villanova	Utah	defeated UC Irvine 84–75	defeated No. 3 Iowa 91–82	defeated VCU 74–54	lost to No. 1 Indiana State 90–100	−
	Bid	W-L (%):	1–0 (1.000)	1–0 (1.000)	1–0 (1.000)	0–1 (.000)	TOTAL: 3–1 (.750)

Index to colors and formatting
Pac-12 member won
Pac-12 member lost

== Awards and honors ==
=== Pac-12 Players of the Week ===
Throughout the regular season, the Pac-12 offices will honor 2 players based on performance by naming them player of the week and freshman of the week.

Week	Player of the week	School	Freshman of the week	School	Ref.
November 13, 2023	Kylan Boswell	Arizona	Isaiah Collier	USC	
November 20, 2023	Branden Carlson	Utah	Isaiah Collier (2)	USC	
November 27, 2023	Fardaws Aimaq	California	Sebastian Mack	UCLA	
December 4, 2023	Boogie Ellis	USC	Myles Rice	Washington State	
December 11, 2023	Tristan da Silva	Colorado	Myles Rice (2)	Washington State	
December 18, 2023	Sahvir Wheeler	Washington	Andrej Stojakovic	Stanford	
December 26, 2023	Oumar Ballo	Arizona	Sebastian Mack (2)	UCLA	
January 2, 2024	Branden Carlson (2)	Utah	Kanaan Carlyle	Stanford	
January 8, 2024	Caleb Love	Arizona	Isaiah Collier (3)	USC	
January 15, 2024	Isaac Jones	Washington State	Myles Rice (3)	Washington State	
January 22, 2024	Deivon Smith	Utah	Cody Williams	Colorado	
January 29, 2024	Jordan Pope	Oregon State	Myles Rice (4)	Washington State	
February 5, 2024	Dylan Andrews	UCLA	Myles Rice (5)	Washington State	
February 12, 2024	Pelle Larsson	Arizona	Myles Rice (6)	Washington State	
February 19, 2024	Isaac Jones (2)	Washington State	Myles Rice (7)	Washington State	
February 25, 2024	KJ Simpson	Colorado	Rueben Chinyelu	Washington State	
March 4, 2024	Deivon Smith (2)	Utah	Isaiah Collier (4)	USC	
March 11, 2024	J'Vonne Hadley	Colorado	Jackson Shelstad	Oregon	

==== Totals per school ====
School	Total
Washington State	10
USC	5
Arizona	4
Colorado	4
Utah	4
UCLA	3
Stanford	2
California	1
Oregon	1
Oregon State	1
Washington	1
Arizona State	0

=== All-Americans ===
To earn "consensus" status, a player must win honors based on a point system computed from the four different all-America teams. The point system consists of three points for first team, two points for second team and one point for third team. No honorable mention or fourth team or lower are used in the computation. The top five totals plus ties are first team and the next five plus ties are second team.

Player	School	Position	Selector	Consensus
Second Team All-Americans
Caleb Love	Arizona	SG	NABC, USBWA	
Third Team All-Americans
Caleb Love	Arizona	SG	AP, SN	

*Associated Press All-America Team
*National Association of Basketball Coaches All-America Team
*Sporting News All-America Team
*USBWA All-America Team

=== All-District ===
The United States Basketball Writers Association (USBWA) named the following from the Pac-12 to their All-District Teams:

District VIII

All-District Team

District IX

Player of the Year

All-District Team

The National Association of Basketball Coaches (NABC) named the following from the Pac-12 to their All-District Teams:

District 19
First Team

- Keion Brooks Jr. – Washington
- Isaac Jones – Washington State
- Caleb Love – Arizona
- KJ Simpson – Colorado
- Jaylon Tyson – California

Second Team

- Oumar Ballo – Arizona
- Adem Bona – UCLA
- Branden Carlson – Utah
- Pelle Larsson – Arizona
- Myles Rice – Washington State

Coach of the Year

- Kyle Smith – Washington State

=== Pac-12 season awards ===
Pac-12 individual awards
Award	Recipient(s)
Player of the Year	Caleb Love, Arizona
Coach of the Year	Kyle Smith, Washington State
Defensive Player of the Year	Adem Bona, UCLA
Freshman of the Year	Myles Rice, Washington State
Most Improved Player of the Year	Maxime Raynaud, Stanford
Sixth Player of the Year	Koren Johnson, Washington
Scholar-Athlete of the Year	Brandon Angel, Stanford

==== All-Pac-12 ====
All-Pac-12 first team
Name	School	Pos.	Yr.	Ht.	Hometown (Last School)
Oumar Ballo††	Arizona	C	R-Sr.	7−0, 260	Koulikoro, Mali (Gonzaga)
Adem Bona	UCLA	C	So.	6−10, 245	Ebonyi, Nigeria (Prolific Prep)
Keion Brooks Jr.	Washington	F	Gr.	6−7, 210	Fort Wayne, Ind. (Kentucky)
Branden Carlson††	Utah	C	Sr.	7−0, 228	South Jordan, Utah (Bingham)
N'Faly Dante††	Oregon	C	Sr.	6−11, 230	Bamako, Mali (Sunrise Christian Academy)
Isaac Jones	Washington State	F	Gr.	6−9, 245	Spanaway, Wash. (Orting)
Caleb Love‡	Arizona	G	Sr.	6−4, 205	St. Louis, Mo. (North Carolina)
Myles Rice	Washington State	G	R-Fr.	6−3, 180	Columbia, S.C. (Sandy Creek)
KJ Simpson	Colorado	G	So.	6−2, 190	West Hills, Cali. (Chaminade College Prep)
Jaylon Tyson	California	G	Jr.	6−7, 215	Plano, Tex. (Texas Tech)

- ‡ Pac-12 Player of the Year
- ††† three-time All-Pac-12 First Team honoree
- †† two-time All-Pac-12 First Team honoree

All-Pac-12 second team
Name	School	Pos.	Yr.	Ht.	Hometown (Last School)
Jermaine Couisnard	Oregon	G	Sr.	6−4, 210	East Chicago, Ind.(South Carolina)
Tristan da Silva	Colorado	F	Sr.	6−9, 220	Munich, Germany
Boogie Ellis	USC	G	Gr.	6−3, 190	San Diego, Calif. (Mission Bay)
Pelle Larsson	Arizona	G	Sr.	6−3, 180	Nacka, Sweden (Utah)
Maxime Raynaud	Stanford	F	Jr.	7−1, 250	Paris, France (Lycee Henri IV)

Honorable Mention

- Isaiah Collier, (USC, G)
- Frankie Collins, (ASU, G)
- Jordan Pope (Oregon State, G)
- Deivon Smith, (Utah, G)
- Jaylen Wells, (Washington State, F)

==== All-Freshman Team ====
Name	School	Pos.	Ht.
Isaiah Collier	USC	G	6−4, 210
Sebastian Mack	UCLA	G	6−3, 200
Myles Rice‡	Washington State	G	6−3, 180
Jackson Shelstad	Oregon	G	6−0, 170
Cody Williams	Colorado	F	6−9, 190

‡ Pac-12 Freshman of the Year

Honorable Mention

- Kanaan Carlyle, (Stan, G)
- KJ Lewis, (Ariz, G)

==== All-Defensive Team ====
Name	School	Pos.	Yr.	Ht.
Oumar Ballo	Arizona	C	R-Sr.	7−0, 260
Adem Bona‡††	UCLA	C	So.	6−10, 245
Frankie Collins	Arizona State	G	Jr.	6−1, 185
N'Faly Dante	Oregon	C	Sr.	6−11, 230
Kobe Johnson††	USC	G	Jr.	6−6, 200

- ‡Pac-12 Defensive Player of the Year
- †† two-time Pac-12 All-Defensive Team honoree

Honorable Mention

- Keshad Johnson, (Ariz, F)
- Spencer Jones, (Stan, F)
- Joshua Morgan, (USC, C)
- KJ Simpson, (Col, G)

==== Scholar Athlete of the year ====
The Pac-12 moved to seasonal Academic Honor Rolls, discontinuing sport-by-sport teams, starting in 2019−20 Source:

Name	School	Year	Pos.	Ht., Wt.	GPA	Major
Brandon Angel	Stanford	Senior	F	6−1, 185	3.99	Economics

=== All-Tournament Team ===
Name	Pos.	Height	Weight	Year	Team
Oumar Ballo	Center	7−0	260	RS-Junior	Arizona
Jermaine Couisnard	Shooting guard	6−4	210	Graduate Senior	Oregon
N'Faly Dante	Center	6−11	265	Senior	Oregon
Tristan da Silva	Power forward	6−9	220	Senior	Colorado
KJ Simpson	Point guard	6−9	190	Junior	Colorado

=== Pac-12 Tournament Most Outstanding Player ===
Name	Pos.	Height	Weight	Year	Team
N'Faly Dante	Center	6−11	265	Senior	Oregon

=== 2023–24 Season statistic leaders ===
Scoring leaders
Rk	Player	PTS	PPG
1	Keion Brooks Jr.	674	21.1
2	KJ Simpson	728	19.6
3	Jaylon Tyson	607	19.6
4	Caleb Love	635	18.1
5	Jordan Pope	562	17.6

Rebound leaders
Rk	Player	REB	RPG
1	Fardaws Aimaq	351	11.0
2	Oumar Ballo	350	10.0
3	Maxime Raynaud	306	9.6
4	Isaac Jones	265	7.5
5	Eddie Lampkin Jr.	260	7.0

Field goal leaders (avg 5 fga/gm)
Rk	Player	FG	FGA	PCT
1	Oumar Ballo	178	271	65.7%
2	Keba Keita	118	192	61.5%
3	Adem Bona	153	260	58.8%
4	Eddie Lampkin Jr.	158	273	5.9%
5	Isaac Jones	199	346	57.5%

Assist leaders
Rk	Player	AST	APG
1	Sahvir Wheeler	188	6.1
2	KJ Simpson	181	4.9
3	Isaiah Collier	115	4.3
4	Myles Rice	134	3.8
5	Dylan Andrews	119	3.7

Block leaders
Rk	Player	BLK	BPG
1	Joshua Morgan	71	2.3
2	Adem Bona	58	1.8
3	Branden Carlson	54	1.5
4	Oumar Ballo	44	1.3
5	Rueben Chinyelu	45	1.3

Free throw leaders
Rk	Player	FT	FTA	PCT
1	Jordan Pope	94	107	87.9%
2	KJ Simpson	163	186	87.6%
3	Lazar Stefanovic	79	91	86.8%
4	J'Vonne Hadley	115	137	83.9%
5	Caleb Love	117	140	83.6%

Steal leaders
Rk	Player	STL	SPG
1	Frankie Collins	84	2.6
2	Kobe Johnson	68	2.2
3	KJ Simpson	60	1.6
4	Jermaine Couisnard	56	1.6
5	Myles Rice	56	1.6

Three point leaders
Rk	Player	3P	3PA	%
1	Brandon Angel	34	76	44.7%
2	Pelle Larsson	45	102	44.1%
3	Jalen Celestine	48	109	44.0%
4	KJ Simpson	79	182	43.4%
5	Boogie Ellis	87	208	41.8%

== 2024 NBA draft ==
PG	Point guard	SG	Shooting guard	SF	Small forward	PF	Power forward	C	Center

Player	Class	Team	Round	Pick #	Position	School	Nationality
Cody Williams	(Fr.)	Utah Jazz	1	10	SG/SF	Colorado	United States
Tristan da Silva	(Sr.)	Orlando Magic	1	18	PF	Colorado	Germany; Brazil
Jaylon Tyson	(Jr.)	Cleveland Cavaliers	1	21	SF	California	United States
Isaiah Collier	(Fr.)	Utah Jazz	1	29	PG	USC	United States
Jaylen Wells	(Jr.)	Memphis Grizzlies	2	39	SF	Washington State	United States
Adem Bona	(So.)	Philadelphia 76ers	2	41	PF/C	UCLA	Nigeria; Turkey
KJ Simpson	(Jr.)	Charlotte Hornets	2	42	PG	Colorado	United States
Pelle Larsson	(Sr.)	Houston Rockets	2	44	SG/SF	Arizona	Sweden
Bronny James	(Fr.)	Los Angeles Lakers	2	55	SG	USC	United States

== TV networks ==
Team	ESPN	ESPN2	ESPNU	Fox	FS1	CBS	CBSSN	Pac-12	TBS	TNT	TruTV	FloHoops	SEC Network	MW Network	Streaming (ESPN+/Peacock)
Arizona	8	2	0	3	3	3	0	15	1	0	0	0	0	0	1
Arizona State	0	9	2	1	6	0	1	12	0	0	0	0	0	0	1
California	1	1	0	1	2	0	2	23	0	0	0	0	1	1	0
Colorado	2	7	2	1	5	1	3	14	0	0	1	0	0	0	0
Oregon	3	4	0	2	5	1	2	15	1	0	1	1	0	0	1
Oregon State	0	3	1	0	1	0	0	26	0	0	0	0	0	0	1
Stanford	1	7	2	0	3	0	1	17	0	0	0	0	0	0	1
UCLA	3	10	0	2	3	2	0	14	0	0	0	0	0	0	0
USC	6	4	1	2	4	1	0	13	0	1	0	0	0	0	1
Utah	3	9	3	0	3	0	0	19	0	0	0	0	0	0	0
Washington	0	6	2	0	4	2	1	16	0	0	1	0	0	0	1
Washington State	0	1	2	0	2	0	0	26	0	1	0	0	0	0	1

== Home game attendance ==
Team	Stadium	Capacity	Game 1	Game 2	Game 3	Game 4	Game 5	Game 6	Game 7	Game 8	Game 9	Game 10	Game 11	Game 12	Game 13	Game 14	Game 15	Game 16	Game 17	Game 18	Total	Average	% of Capacity
Arizona	McKale Center	14,688	13,455	12,868	**14,688**†	13,403	**14,688**†	**14,688**†	14,286	**14,688**†	**14,688**†	**14,688**†	**14,688**†	**14,688**†	**14,688**†	**14,688**†	**14,688**†	**14,688**†			230,268	14,392	97.98%
Arizona State	Desert Financial Arena	14,198	7,263	6,857	6,090	6,563	6,812	6,259	8,128	10,096	13,743	7,234	7,901	6,689	7,401	9,586	14,129†				124,751	8,317	58.58%
California	Haas Pavilion	11,858	3,066	3,195	2,628	2,638	3,356	2,516	5,947	2,429	2,258	2,913	3,201	8,710	11,801†	9,280	3,012	6,105			64,345	4,022	33.91%
Colorado	Coors Events Center	11,064	6,078	6,541	6,181	6,346	7,231	7,177	6,426	7,799	6,952	10,005	8,177	7,944	7,109	10,548†	9,075	6,926	7,518		128,033	7,531	68.07%
Oregon	Matthew Knight Arena	12,364	7,141	5,279	11,241	5,084	4,582	5,056	8,934	7,268	6,748	6,170	**12,364**†	7,584	7,617	8,365	7,794	8,668			119,895	7,493	60.60%
Oregon State	Gill Coliseum	9,604	2,483	2,934	2,766	2,757	2,568	2,867	2,440	2,576	3,087	4,318	3,423	4,239	3,842	3,562	3,675	7,574†	3,362	3,172	61,645	3,425	35.65%
Stanford	Maples Pavilion	7,233	2,133	2,559	2,649	2,038	2,455	4,345	2,801	4,155	3,037	2,855	4,174	3,844	**7,563**†	3,284	3,755	4,967			53,330	3,333	46.08%
UCLA	Pauley Pavilion	13,800	6,783	6,259	4,751	6,609	7,274	7,056	6,224	7,342	6,532	6,095	8,723	7,183	9,537	**13,659**†	8,428	7,424			111,156	6,947	50.34%
USC	Galen Center	10,258	6,211	4,730	4,522	3,177	9,806	4,603	6,481	6,218	**10,300**†	4,862	6,541	5,122	6,142	6,834	8,976				94,525	6,302	61.43%
Utah	Jon M. Huntsman Center	15,000	7,632	7,565	7,161	**15,648**†	8,349	7,310	8,235	7,468	8,934	8,063	7,919	9,294	10,944	8,235	8,833	8,841			140,431	8,777	58.51%
Washington	Alaska Airlines Arena	10,000	5,568	6,026	6,154	5,726	6,042	9,294†	7,453	8,522	7,376	5,641	5,210	7,419	9,294†	6,927	8,916	7,893	9,294†		122,755	7,221	72.21%
Washington State	Beasley Coliseum	11,671	2,323	2,282	2,736	2,208	2,257	2,057	2,158	2,524	2,892	3,564	2,605	3,273	2,744	5,671	8,288	8,096	9,311†		64,989	3,822	32.75%
Total		11,812																			1,315,663	6,747	57.11%

Bold – At or exceed capacity
†Season high

== See also ==
- 2023–24 Pac-12 Conference women's basketball season
