= 2023–24 California Golden Bears men's basketball team =

Men's basketball team

2023–24 California Golden Bears men's basketball
- Conference: Pac-12 Conference
- Record: 13–19 (9–11 Pac–12)
- Head coach: Mark Madsen (1st season)
- Associate head coach: Adam Mazarei
- Assistant coaches: Amorrow Morgan; Matt Scherbenske; Jarred Jackson; Ken Moses
- Home arena: Haas Pavilion (Capacity: 11,877)

2023–24 Pac-12 Conference men's basketball standings
	Conf.				Overall
Team	W		L	PCT	W		L	PCT
No. 11 Arizona	15	–	5	.750	27	–	9	.750
No. 23 Washington State	14	–	6	.700	25	–	10	.714
Colorado	13	–	7	.650	26	–	11	.703
Oregon †	12	–	8	.600	24	–	12	.667
UCLA	10	–	10	.500	16	–	17	.485
Utah	9	–	11	.450	22	–	15	.595
California	9	–	11	.450	13	–	19	.406
Washington	9	–	11	.450	17	–	15	.531
USC	8	–	12	.400	15	–	18	.455
Stanford	8	–	12	.400	14	–	18	.438
Arizona State	8	–	12	.400	14	–	18	.438
Oregon State	5	–	15	.250	13	–	19	.406
† 2024 Pac-12 tournament winner Rankings from AP Poll

The 2023–24 California Golden Bears men's basketball team represented the University of California, Berkeley, in the 2023–24 NCAA Division I men's basketball season. This was Mark Madsen's first year as head coach at California. The Golden Bears played their home games at Haas Pavilion in their last season as members of the Pac-12 Conference, before joining the Atlantic Coast Conference in the 2024–25 season.

== Previous season ==
The Golden Bears started the year losing their first 12 games, the worst for any Power Five team in history. They won three of their next four games, including two in conference play against Colorado and Stanford. The Golden Bears finished the year by losing the last 15 games in conference play and their first-round game in the conference tournament.

At the end of the year, Mark Fox was fired on March 9, 2023, one day after losing their first-round game of the conference tournament.

== Off-season ==
=== Departures ===
Departures
Name	Pos.	Height	Weight	Year	Hometown	Reason for departure
Marsalis Roberson	G	6'6"	200	Sophomore	Oakland, CA	Transferred to UC Davis
Joel Brown	G	6'3"	192	Senior	Brampton, Ontario	Transferred to Iona
Jarred Hyder	G	6'3"	185	Senior	San Bernardino, CA	Transferred to Cal Poly
Kuany Kuany	F	6'9"	200	Senior	Melbourne, Australia	Transferred to VCU
Lars Thiemann	C	7'1"	260	Senior	Krefeld, Germany	Transferred to Loyola Marymount
Obinna Anyanwu	F	6'7"	225	Sophomore	San Diego, CA	Entered the Transfer Portal
Sam Alajiki	F	6'7"	230	Sophomore	Dundalk, Ireland	Transferred to Rice
Dejuan Clayton	G	6'2"	190	Graduate student	Bowie, MD	Transferred to Manhattan

=== Incoming transfers ===
Incoming transfers
Name	Pos.	Height	Weight	Year	Hometown	Previous school
Jaylon Tyson	F	6'7"	210	Junior	Plano, TX	Transferred from Texas Tech
Keonte Kennedy	G	6'5"	180	Graduate student	Austin, TX	Transferred from Memphis
Fardaws Aimaq	F	6'11"	245	Graduate student	Vancouver, British Columbia	Transferred from Texas Tech
Jalen Cone	G	5'11"	175	Graduate student	Walkertown, NC	Transferred from Northern Arizona
Mike Meadows	G	6'2"	175	Graduate student	Hollywood, CA	Transferred from Portland; transferred out to Saint Louis in August, before the start of the season
Gus Larson	F	6'10"	215	(redshirt) Sophomore	New Canaan, Connecticut	Transferred from Penn

=== 2023 recruiting class ===
College recruiting
Name	Hometown	School	Height	Weight	Commit date
Rodney Brown; G	Temecula, CA	Rancho Christian School	6 ft 6 in (1.98 m)	170 lb (77 kg)	Nov 7, 2022
Rodney Brown; G	Recruit ratings: Rivals: 247Sports: ESPN: (82)				
Devin Curtis; C	Northridge, CA	Heritage Christian School	6 ft 11 in (2.11 m)	210 lb (95 kg)	Nov 9, 2022
Devin Curtis; C	Recruit ratings: Rivals: 247Sports: ESPN: (79)				
Overall recruit ranking:
Note: In many cases, Scout, Rivals, 247Sports, On3, and ESPN may conflict in their listings of height and weight.; In these cases, the average was taken. ESPN grades are on a 100-point scale.; Sources: "2023 California Commits". Rivals.; "2023 Team Ranking". Rivals.

== Roster ==
2023–24 California Golden Bears men's basketball team
Players
Coaches

Pos.	#	Name	Height	Weight	Year	Previous school	Hometown
F	00	Fardaws Aimaq	6 ft 11 in (2.11 m)	245 lb (111 kg)	GS	Steveston-London Secondary School; Texas Tech	Vancouver, British Columbia
G	1	Rodney Brown Jr.	6 ft 6 in (1.98 m)	190 lb (86 kg)	Fr	Rancho Christian School	Perris, CA
F	2	Monty Bowser	6 ft 7 in (2.01 m)	195 lb (88 kg)	RS Jr	Bishop O'Dowd High School	Oakland, CA
G	3	Keonte Kennedy	6 ft 5 in (1.96 m)	180 lb (82 kg)	GS	Westlake High School; Memphis; Xavier	Austin, TX
G	10	Jayden Karapetian	6 ft 2 in (1.88 m)	170 lb (77 kg)	Fr	Viewpoint School	Woodland Hills, CA
G	12	Jack McCloskey	6 ft 4 in (1.93 m)	180 lb (82 kg)	So	Mater Dei High School	Santa Ana, CA
F	13	Devin Curtis	6 ft 11 in (2.11 m)	210 lb (95 kg)	Fr	Heritage Christian School	Northridge, CA
F	14	Grant Newell	6 ft 8 in (2.03 m)	220 lb (100 kg)	So	IMG Academy (FL)	Chicago, IL
G	15	Jalen Cone	5 ft 11 in (1.8 m)	175 lb (79 kg)	GS	Walkertown High School; Northern Arizona; Virginia Tech	Walkertown, NC
G	20	Jaylon Tyson	6 ft 7 in (2.01 m)	210 lb (95 kg)	Jr	John Paul II High School; Texas Tech; Texas	Plano, TX
F	22	ND Okafor	6 ft 9 in (2.06 m)	235 lb (107 kg)	So	NBA Academy Latin America	Dundalk, Ireland
G	23	Matt Desler	6 ft 1 in (1.85 m)	180 lb (82 kg)	Jr	Bishop O'Dowd High School	Oakland, CA
G	30	Wrenn Robinson	6 ft 2 in (1.88 m)	185 lb (84 kg)	RS Jr	St. Ignatius College Preparatory; City College of San Francisco	Oakland, CA
F	31	Gus Larson	6 ft 10 in (2.08 m)	215 lb (98 kg)	RS So	Northfield Mount Hermon School; Penn	New Canaan, CT
G	32	Jalen Celestine	6 ft 7 in (2.01 m)	215 lb (98 kg)	Jr	Long Island Lutheran Middle and High School	Ajax, Ontario
G	33	Vladimir Pavlovic	6 ft 3 in (1.91 m)	190 lb (86 kg)	Fr	Hoosac School	Herceg Novi, Montenegro
F	50	Adrian Claiborne Jr. (W)	6 ft 5 in (1.96 m)	195 lb (88 kg)	Sr	John W. North High School	Riverside, CA
G	55	Devin Askew	6 ft 3 in (1.91 m)	198 lb (90 kg)	Jr	Mater Dei High School; Texas	Sacramento, CA

Head coach

- Mark Madsen (Stanford)

Assistant coach(es)

- Adam Mazarei (Redlands)
- Amorrow Morgan (Idaho State)
- Matt Scherbenske (Kentucky)
- Jarred Jackson (Lander)
- Ken Moses (CSU Pueblo)

Legend

- (C) Team captain
- (S) Suspended
- (I) Ineligible
- (W) Walk-on
- Injured
- Current redshirt

Roster

== Schedule and results ==
Date time, TV	Rank^{#}	Opponent^{#}	Result	Record	High points	High rebounds	High assists	Site (attendance) city, state
Non-conference regular season
November 6, 2023*; 6:00 p.m., P12N		St. Thomas (MN)	W 71–66	1–0	21 – Celestine	11 – Aimaq	2 – Askew	Haas Pavilion (3,066); Berkeley, CA
November 10, 2023*; 8:00 p.m., P12N		Pacific	L 79–87	1–1	22 – Cone	11 – Tyson	3 – Tied	Haas Pavilion (3,195); Berkeley, CA
November 13, 2023*; 7:00 p.m., P12N		Cal State Bakersfield; SoCal Challenge campus site game	W 83–63	2–1	23 – Cone	12 – Tyson	7 – Tyson	Haas Pavilion (2,628); Berkeley, CA
November 16, 2023*; 8:00 p.m., P12N		Montana State	L 60–63	2–2	27 – Tyson	12 – Aimaq	2 – Tied	Haas Pavilion (2,638); Berkeley, CA
November 20, 2023*; 10:00 p.m., CBSSN		vs. UTEP; SoCal Challenge Surf Division semifinals	L 72–75	2–3	18 – Aimaq	11 – Aimaq	2 – Tied	The Pavilion at JSerra (529); San Juan Capistrano, CA
November 22, 2023*; 9:30 p.m., CBSSN		vs. Tulane; SoCal Challenge Surf Division 3rd place game	L 81–84	2–4	24 – Tyson	14 – Aimaq	5 – Tyson	The Pavilion at JSerra (312); San Juan Capistrano, CA
November 25, 2023*; 4:00 p.m., MWN		vs. San Diego State; SoCal Showcase	L 67–76 ^{OT}	2–5	23 – Tyson	18 – Aimaq	5 – Cone	The Pavilion at JSerra (2,293); San Juan Capistrano, CA
December 2, 2023*; 4:00 p.m., P12N		Santa Clara	W 84–69	3–5	26 – Cone	11 – Tyson	4 – Kennedy	Haas Pavilion (3,356); Berkeley, CA
December 9, 2023*; 9:00 a.m., FS1		at Butler	L 90–97 ^{2OT}	3–6	24 – Aimaq	16 – Aimaq	7 – Tyson	Hinkle Fieldhouse (8,034); Indianapolis, IN
December 16, 2023*; 4:30 p.m., SECN		vs. Ole Miss; Hall of Fame Series San Antonio	L 78–88	3–7	22 – Tyson	12 – Aimaq	6 – Kennedy	Frost Bank Center (2,279); San Antonio, TX
December 20, 2023*; 2:00 p.m., P12N		UC San Diego	W 71–67	4–7	19 – Aimaq	10 – Aimaq	5 – Tied	Haas Pavilion (2,516); Berkeley, CA
Pac-12 regular season
December 29, 2023; 7:30 p.m., P12N		No. 4 Arizona	L 81–100	4–8 (0–1)	22 – Tyson	10 – Tyson	5 – Askew	Haas Pavilion (5,947); Berkeley, CA
December 31, 2023; 5:00 p.m., P12N		Arizona State	L 69–71	4–9 (0–2)	20 – Tyson	14 – Aimaq	5 – Tyson	Haas Pavilion (2,429); Berkeley, CA
January 3, 2024; 7:00 p.m., P12N		at USC	L 74–82	4–10 (0–3)	23 – Tyson	8 – Aimaq	8 – Aimaq	Galen Center (4,603); Los Angeles, CA
January 6, 2024; 7:00 p.m., P12N		at UCLA	W 66–57	5–10 (1–3)	22 – Tyson	14 – Aimaq	3 – Tied	Pauley Pavilion (7,342); Los Angeles, CA
January 11, 2024; 8:00 p.m., ESPN2		Colorado	W 82–78	6–10 (2–3)	30 – Tyson	10 – Aimaq	3 – Cone	Haas Pavilion (2,258); Berkeley, CA
January 13, 2024; 5:00 p.m., P12N		at Oregon	L 73–80	6–11 (2–4)	20 – Tyson	10 – Tyson	3 – Cone	Matthew Knight Arena (6,748); Eugene, OR
January 18, 2024; 6:00 p.m., P12N		Washington	L 75–77	6–12 (2–5)	18 – Aimaq	10 – Aimaq	5 – Aimaq	Haas Pavilion (2,913); Berkeley, CA
January 20, 2024; 2:00 p.m., P12N		Washington State	W 81–75 ^{OT}	7–12 (3–5)	30 – Tyson	14 – Aimaq	5 – Tyson	Haas Pavilion (3,201); Berkeley, CA
January 26, 2024; 7:00 p.m., FS1		Stanford; Rivalry	W 73–71	8–12 (4–5)	14 – Tyson	12 – Aimaq	4 – Tyson	Haas Pavilion (8,710); Berkeley, CA
February 1, 2024; 5:30 p.m., P12N		at No. 11 Arizona	L 65–91	8–13 (4–6)	13 – Celestine	10 – Tyson	4 – Tyson	McKale Center (14,688); Tucson, AZ
February 3, 2024; 12:00 p.m., P12N		at Arizona State	W 81–66	9–13 (5–6)	20 – Aimaq	14 – Aimaq	5 – Tied	Desert Financial Arena (7,901); Tempe, AZ
February 7, 2024; 8:00 p.m., P12N		USC	W 83–77 ^{OT}	10–13 (6–6)	27 – Tyson	20 – Aimaq	5 – Aimaq	Haas Pavilion (11,801); Berkeley, CA
February 10, 2024; 2:30 p.m., FOX		UCLA	L 60–61	10–14 (6–7)	16 – Tyson	12 – Aimaq	3 – Tyson	Haas Pavilion (9,280); Berkeley, CA
February 15, 2024; 7:00 p.m., P12N		at Washington State	L 65–84	10–15 (6–8)	18 – Tyson	11 – Aimaq	4 – Brown	Beasley Coliseum (2,744); Pullman, WA
February 17, 2024; 5:00 p.m., P12N		at Washington	W 82–80	11–15 (7–8)	28 – Tyson	15 – Aimaq	6 – Tyson	Alaska Airlines Arena (8,916); Seattle, WA
February 22, 2024; 7:00 p.m., P12N		Oregon State	W 81–73	12–15 (8–8)	20 – Aimaq	11 – Aimaq	5 – Tied	Haas Pavilion (3,012); Berkeley, CA
February 24, 2024; 6:00 p.m., P12N		Oregon; Senior Night	W 69–64	13–15 (9–8)	27 – Tyson	14 – Aimaq	3 – Tied	Haas Pavilion (6,105); Berkeley, CA
February 28, 2024; 5:00 p.m., P12N		at Colorado	L 78–88	13–16 (9–9)	25 – Tyson	11 – Aimaq	4 – Tyson	CU Events Center (6,926); Boulder, CO
March 2, 2024; 6:00 p.m., P12N		at Utah	L 59–88	13–17 (9–10)	19 – Cone	5 – Aimaq	3 – Tied	Jon M. Huntsman Center (8,841); Salt Lake City, UT
March 7, 2024; 8:00 p.m., ESPN2		at Stanford; Rivalry	L 58–80	13–18 (9–11)	18 – Aimaq	9 – Aimaq	3 – Tyson	Maples Pavilion (4,967); Stanford, CA
Pac-12 tournament
March 13, 2024; 6:00 p.m., P12N	(7)	vs. (10) Stanford; First round/Rivalry	L 76–87 ^{OT}	13–19	19 – Cone	9 – Aimaq	8 – Tyson	T-Mobile Arena; Paradise, NV
*Non-conference game. ^{#}Rankings from AP Poll. (#) Tournament seedings in parentheses. All times are in Pacific Time.
