= 2023–24 Washington Huskies men's basketball team =

American college basketball season

2023–24 Washington Huskies men's basketball
- Conference: Pac-12 Conference
- Record: 17–15 (9–11 Pac-12)
- Head coach: Mike Hopkins (7th season)
- Associate head coach: Will Conroy (9th season)
- Assistant coaches: Quincy Pondexter (3rd season); Jerry Hobbie (1st season); Ben Lee (1st season)
- Home arena: Alaska Airlines Arena

2023–24 Pac-12 Conference men's basketball standings
	Conf.				Overall
Team	W		L	PCT	W		L	PCT
No. 11 Arizona	15	–	5	.750	27	–	9	.750
No. 23 Washington State	14	–	6	.700	25	–	10	.714
Colorado	13	–	7	.650	26	–	11	.703
Oregon †	12	–	8	.600	24	–	12	.667
UCLA	10	–	10	.500	16	–	17	.485
Utah	9	–	11	.450	22	–	15	.595
California	9	–	11	.450	13	–	19	.406
Washington	9	–	11	.450	17	–	15	.531
USC	8	–	12	.400	15	–	18	.455
Stanford	8	–	12	.400	14	–	18	.438
Arizona State	8	–	12	.400	14	–	18	.438
Oregon State	5	–	15	.250	13	–	19	.406
† 2024 Pac-12 tournament winner Rankings from AP Poll

The 2023–24 Washington Huskies men's basketball team represented the University of Washington in the 2023–24 NCAA Division I men's basketball season. The Huskies, led by seventh-year head coach Mike Hopkins, played their home games at Alaska Airlines Arena at Hec Edmundson Pavilion in Seattle, Washington, in their last season as members of the Pac-12 Conference. They finished the season 17–15, 9–11 in Pac-12 play to finish in a three-way tie for sixth place. As the No. 8 seed in the Pac-12 tournament, they lost to USC in the first round.

On March 8, 2024, the school announced that head coach Mike Hopkins would be fired after the season. On March 25, the school named Utah State head coach Danny Sprinkle the team's new head coach.

The season marked the final year for the school as a member of the Pac-12 conference. In August 2023, the school announced it would join the Big Ten Conference in 2024.

== Previous season ==
The Huskies finished the 2022–23 season 16–15, 8–12 in Pac-12 play to tie for eighth place. They lost in the first round of the Pac-12 tournament to Colorado.

== Offseason ==
=== Departures ===
Washington departures
Name	Number	Pos.	Height	Weight	Year	Hometown	Reason for departure
PJ Fuller	4	G	6'4"	175	Senior	Seattle, WA	Graduate transferred to Detroit Mercy
Jamal Bey	5	G	6'6"	210	GS senior	Las Vegas, NV	Graduated
Tyler Linhardt	10	F	6'7"	210	Freshman	Seattle, WA	Transferred to Idaho
Jackson Grant	12	F	6'10"	205	Sophomore	Olympia, WA	Transferred to Utah State
Langston Wilson	13	F	6'9"	200	Senior	Upper Darby, PA	Graduate transferred to Milwaukee
Kyle Luttinen	14	G	6'7"	185	Junior	Seattle, WA	Walk-on; transferred
Griff Hopkins	15	G	6'4"	185	Junior	Syracuse, NY	Walk-on; left the team for personal reasons
Cole Bajema	22	G	6'7"	190	Senior	Lynden, WA	Graduate transferred to Utah
Keyon Menifield	23	G	6'1"	170	Freshman	Flint, MI	Transferred to Arkansas
Noah Williams	24	G	6'5"	195	Senior	Seattle, WA	Graduate transferred
Anthony Iglesia	30	G	5'7"	150	Senior	Syracuse, NY	Walk-on; left the team for personal reasons

=== Incoming transfers ===
Washington incoming transfers
Name	Number	Pos.	Height	Weight	Year	Hometown	Previous school
Sahvir Wheeler	5	G	5'9"	180	GS senior	Houston, TX	Kentucky
Nate Calmese	8	G	6'2"	164	Sophomore	Gilbert, AZ	Lamar
Paul Mulcahy	9	G	6'6"	213	GS senior	Bayonne, NJ	Rutgers
Moses Wood	13	F	6'8"	210	GS senior	Reno, NV	Portland
Anthony Holland	23	G	6'5"	225	GS senior	Riverside, CA	Fresno State
Wilhelm Breidenbach	32	F	6'10"	231	Junior	Rancho Santa Margarita, CA	Nebraska

=== 2023 recruiting class ===
College recruiting
Name	Hometown	School	Height	Weight	Commit date
Wesley Yates #8 SG	Beaumont, TX	Beaumont United High School	6 ft 4 in (1.93 m)	210 lb (95 kg)	Oct 5, 2022
Wesley Yates #8 SG	Recruit ratings: Rivals: 247Sports: ESPN: (85)				
Christian King; SF	Seattle, WA	Seattle Prep	6 ft 8 in (2.03 m)	190 lb (86 kg)	Oct 23, 2022
Christian King; SF	Recruit ratings: Rivals: 247Sports: ESPN: (NR)				
Overall recruit ranking: Rivals: 38 247Sports: 46
Note: In many cases, Scout, Rivals, 247Sports, On3, and ESPN may conflict in their listings of height and weight.; In these cases, the average was taken. ESPN grades are on a 100-point scale.; Sources: "2023 Washington Commits". Rivals.; "ESPN- Washington Huskies Men's Basketball Recruiting". ESPN.; "2023 Team Ranking". Rivals.

== Roster ==
2023–24 Washington Huskies men's basketball team
Players
Coaches

Pos.	#	Name	Height	Weight	Year	Previous school	Hometown
G	0	Koren Johnson	6 ft 2 in (1.88 m)	175 lb (79 kg)	So	Wasatch Academy	Seattle, WA
F	1	Keion Brooks Jr.	6 ft 7 in (2.01 m)	210 lb (95 kg)	GS	Kentucky	Fort Wayne, IN
G	4	Wesley Yates III	6 ft 4 in (1.93 m)	200 lb (91 kg)	Fr	Beaumont United	Beaumont, TX
G	5	Sahvir Wheeler	5 ft 9 in (1.75 m)	180 lb (82 kg)	GS	Kentucky	Harlem, NY
F	7	Isaiah Sherrard (W)	6 ft 6 in (1.98 m)	175 lb (79 kg)	Fr	Oak Park	West Lake Village, CA
G	8	Nate Calmese	6 ft 2 in (1.88 m)	164 lb (74 kg)	So	Lamar	Gilbert, AZ
G	9	Paul Mulcahy	6 ft 7 in (2.01 m)	213 lb (97 kg)	GS	Rutgers	Bayonne, NJ
F	10	Will Landram (W)	6 ft 6 in (1.98 m)	—	Fr	Gig Harbor	Gig Harbor, WA
C	11	Franck Kepnang	6 ft 11 in (2.11 m)	250 lb (113 kg)	Sr	Oregon	Yaoundé, Cameroon
F	13	Moses Wood	6 ft 8 in (2.03 m)	210 lb (95 kg)	GS	Portland	Reno, NV
G	23	Anthony Holland	6 ft 5 in (1.96 m)	225 lb (102 kg)	GS	Fresno State	Riverside, CA
F	31	Christian King	6 ft 7 in (2.01 m)	200 lb (91 kg)	Fr	Seattle Prep	Seattle, WA
F	32	Wilhelm Breidenbach	6 ft 10 in (2.08 m)	232 lb (105 kg)	Jr	Nebraska	Reno, NV
G	33	Sam Slutske (W)	6 ft 2 in (1.88 m)	180 lb (82 kg)	So	Crossroads	Santa Monica, CA
C	34	Braxton Meah	7 ft 1 in (2.16 m)	250 lb (113 kg)	Sr	Fresno State	Fresno, CA
F	35	Samuel Ariyibi	6 ft 8 in (2.03 m)	190 lb (86 kg)	Jr	NBA Africa Academy	Lagos, Nigeria

Head coach

- Mike Hopkins (Syracuse)

Assistant coach(es)

- Will Conroy (Washington)
- Quincy Pondexter (Washington)
- Jerry Hobbie (Fordham)

Legend

- (C) Team captain
- (S) Suspended
- (I) Ineligible
- (W) Walk-on
- Injured
- Current redshirt

Roster

== Schedule and results ==
Date time, TV	Rank^{#}	Opponent^{#}	Result	Record	High points	High rebounds	High assists	Site (attendance) city, state
Exhibition
October 29, 2023*; 7:00 p.m.		Saint Martin's	W 103–58	–	22 – Brooks	12 – Breidenbach	7 – Wheeler	Alaska Airlines Arena (955); Seattle, WA
Non-conference regular season
November 6, 2023*; 8:30 p.m., P12N		Bellarmine	W 91–57	1–0	25 – Johnson	8 – Tied	3 – Calmese	Alaska Airlines Arena (5,568); Seattle, WA
November 9, 2023*; 8:00 p.m., P12N		Northern Kentucky	W 75–67	2–0	32 – Brooks	10 – Brooks	7 – Wheeler	Alaska Airlines Arena (6,026); Seattle, WA
November 12, 2023*; 7:00 p.m., P12N		Nevada	L 76–83	2–1	19 – Brooks	11 – Brooks	5 – Wheeler	Alaska Airlines Arena (6,154); Seattle, WA
November 17, 2023*; 9:00 p.m., ESPN2		vs. Xavier; Continental Tire Main Event semifinals	W 74–71	3–1	20 – Brooks Jr.	12 – Kepnang	5 – Wheeler	T-Mobile Arena (–); Paradise, NV
November 19, 2023*; 7:00 p.m., ESPN2		vs. San Diego State; Continental Tire Main Event championship game	L 97–100 ^{OT}	3–2	22 – Brooks Jr.	8 – Kepnang	13 – Mulcahy	T-Mobile Arena (2,064); Paradise, NV
November 28, 2023*; 7:00 p.m., P12N		UC San Diego	W 83–56	4–2	18 – Brooks Jr.	12 – Brooks Jr.	8 – Wheeler	Alaska Airlines Arena (5,726); Seattle, WA
December 2, 2023*; 4:00 p.m., CBSSN		vs. No. 20 Colorado State; Legends of Basketball Invitational	L 81–86	4–3	21 – Wood	8 – Wood	12 – Wheeler	MGM Grand Garden Arena (–); Paradise, NV
December 5, 2023*; 8:00 p.m., P12N		Montana State	W 85–61	5–3	16 – Kepnang	11 – Kepnang	7 – Mulcahy	Alaska Airlines Arena (6,042); Seattle, WA
December 9, 2023*; 8:00 p.m., ESPN2		No. 7 Gonzaga; Rivalry	W 78–73	6–3	17 – Brooks Jr.	8 – Brooks Jr.	4 – Tied	Alaska Airlines Arena (9,294); Seattle, WA
December 17, 2023*; 5:00 p.m., ESPN+		at Seattle; Rivalry	W 100–99 ^{2OT}	7–3	22 – Brooks Jr.	9 – Brooks Jr.	14 – Wheeler	Climate Pledge Arena (5,702); Seattle, WA
December 21, 2023*; 6:00 p.m., P12N		Eastern Washington	W 73–66	8–3	20 – Brooks Jr.	7 – Meah	5 – Wheeler	Alaska Airlines Arena (7,453); Seattle, WA
Pac-12 regular season
December 29, 2023; 6:00 p.m., ESPNU		at Colorado	L 69–73	8–4 (0–1)	20 – Brooks Jr.	8 – Brooks Jr.	7 – Wheeler	CU Events Center (7,799); Boulder, CO
December 31, 2023; 3:00 p.m., P12N		at Utah	L 90–95	8–5 (0–2)	25 – Brooks Jr.	8 – Wood	6 – Wheeler	Jon M. Huntsman Center (7,468); Salt Lake City, UT
January 4, 2024; 6:00 p.m., P12N		Oregon	L 74–76	8–6 (0–3)	18 – Wheeler	7 – Tied	4 – Wheeler	Alaska Airlines Arena (8,522); Seattle, WA
January 6, 2024; 3:00 p.m., P12N		Oregon State	W 79–72	9–6 (1–3)	26 – Brooks Jr.	8 – Breidenbach	3 – Wheeler	Alaska Airlines Arena (7,376); Seattle, WA
January 11, 2024; 8:00 p.m., FS1		Arizona State	W 82–67	10–6 (2–3)	24 – Wheeler	14 – Meah	8 – Wheeler	Alaska Airlines Arena (5,641); Seattle, WA
January 14, 2024; 4:00 p.m., P12N		at UCLA	L 61–73	10–7 (2–4)	27 – Wheeler	8 – Meah	2 – Wheeler	Pauley Pavilion (6,532); Los Angeles, CA
January 18, 2024; 6:00 p.m., P12N		at California	W 77–75	11–7 (3–4)	21 – Brooks Jr.	7 – Tied	5 – Johnson	Haas Pavilion (2,913); Berkeley, CA
January 20, 2024; 6:00 p.m., P12N		at Stanford	L 80–90	11–8 (3–5)	20 – Brooks Jr.	11 – Brooks Jr.	3 – Wheeler	Maples Pavilion (4,174); Stanford, CA
January 24, 2024; 8:00 p.m., ESPNU		Colorado	L 81–98	11–9 (3–6)	22 – Brooks Jr.	6 – Meah	6 – Wood	Alaska Airlines Arena (5,210); Seattle, WA
January 27, 2024; 7:00 p.m., ESPN2		Utah	W 98–73	12–9 (4–6)	27 – Brooks Jr.	7 – Wood	10 – Wheeler	Alaska Airlines Arena (7,419); Seattle, WA
February 3, 2024; 6:00 p.m., P12N		Washington State; Rivalry	L 87–90 ^{OT}	12–10 (4–7)	35 – Brooks Jr.	7 – Brooks Jr.	6 – Mulcahy	Alaska Airlines Arena (9,294); Seattle, WA
February 8, 2024; 7:00 p.m., FS1		at Oregon	L 80–85	12–11 (4–8)	17 – Brooks Jr.	12 – Meah	7 – Wheeler	Matthew Knight Arena (7,584); Eugene, OR
February 10, 2024; 4:00 p.m., P12N		at Oregon State	W 67–55	13–11 (5–8)	23 – Brooks Jr.	9 – Brooks Jr.	7 – Wheeler	Gill Coliseum (3,675); Corvallis, OR
February 15, 2024; 6:00 p.m., ESPN2		Stanford	W 85–65	14–11 (6–8)	30 – Johnson	13 – Meah	8 – Wheeler	Alaska Airlines Arena (6,927); Seattle, WA
February 17, 2024; 5:00 p.m., P12N		California	L 80–82	14–12 (6–9)	26 – Brooks Jr.	7 – Tied	5 – Mulcahy	Alaska Airlines Arena (8,916); Seattle, WA
February 22, 2024; 6:00 p.m., ESPN2		at Arizona State	W 84–82 ^{OT}	15–12 (7–9)	21 – Brooks	14 – Meah	7 – Johnson	Desert Financial Arena (7,401); Tempe, AZ
February 24, 2024; 11:00 a.m., CBS		at No. 4 Arizona	L 75–91	15–13 (7–10)	17 – Johnson	6 – Tied	6 – Wheeler	McKale Center (14,688); Tucson, AZ
February 29, 2024; 7:30 p.m., FS1		UCLA	W 94–77	16–13 (8–10)	32 – Brooks Jr.	8 – Meah	11 – Wheeler	Alaska Airlines Arena (7,893); Seattle, WA
March 2, 2024; 1:00 p.m., CBS		USC; Senior Night	L 75–82	16–14 (8–11)	21 – Wheeler	7 – Brooks Jr.	7 – Mulcahy	Alaska Airlines Arena (9,294); Seattle, WA
March 7, 2024; 6:00 p.m., FS1		at No. 18 Washington State; Rivalry	W 74–68	17–14 (9–11)	23 – Johnson	9 – Brooks Jr.	6 – Wheeler	Beasley Coliseum (9,311); Pullman, WA
Pac-12 Tournament
March 13, 2024; 12:00 p.m., P12N	(8)	vs. (9) USC; First round	L 74−80	17–15	20 – Wheeler	8 – Brooks Jr.	7 – Wheeler	T-Mobile Arena (10,050); Paradise, NV
*Non-conference game. ^{#}Rankings from AP Poll. (#) Tournament seedings in parentheses. All times are in Pacific Time.

== Rankings ==
Ranking movements Legend: ██ Increase in ranking ██ Decrease in ranking — = Not ranked RV = Received votes
	Week																			
Poll	Pre	1	2	3	4	5	6	7	8	9	10	11	12	13	14	15	16	17	18	Final
AP	—	—	—	—	—	—	RV	—	—	—	—									
Coaches	—	—	—	—	—	—	—	—	—	—	—									
