= Myles Rice =

American basketball player (born 2002)

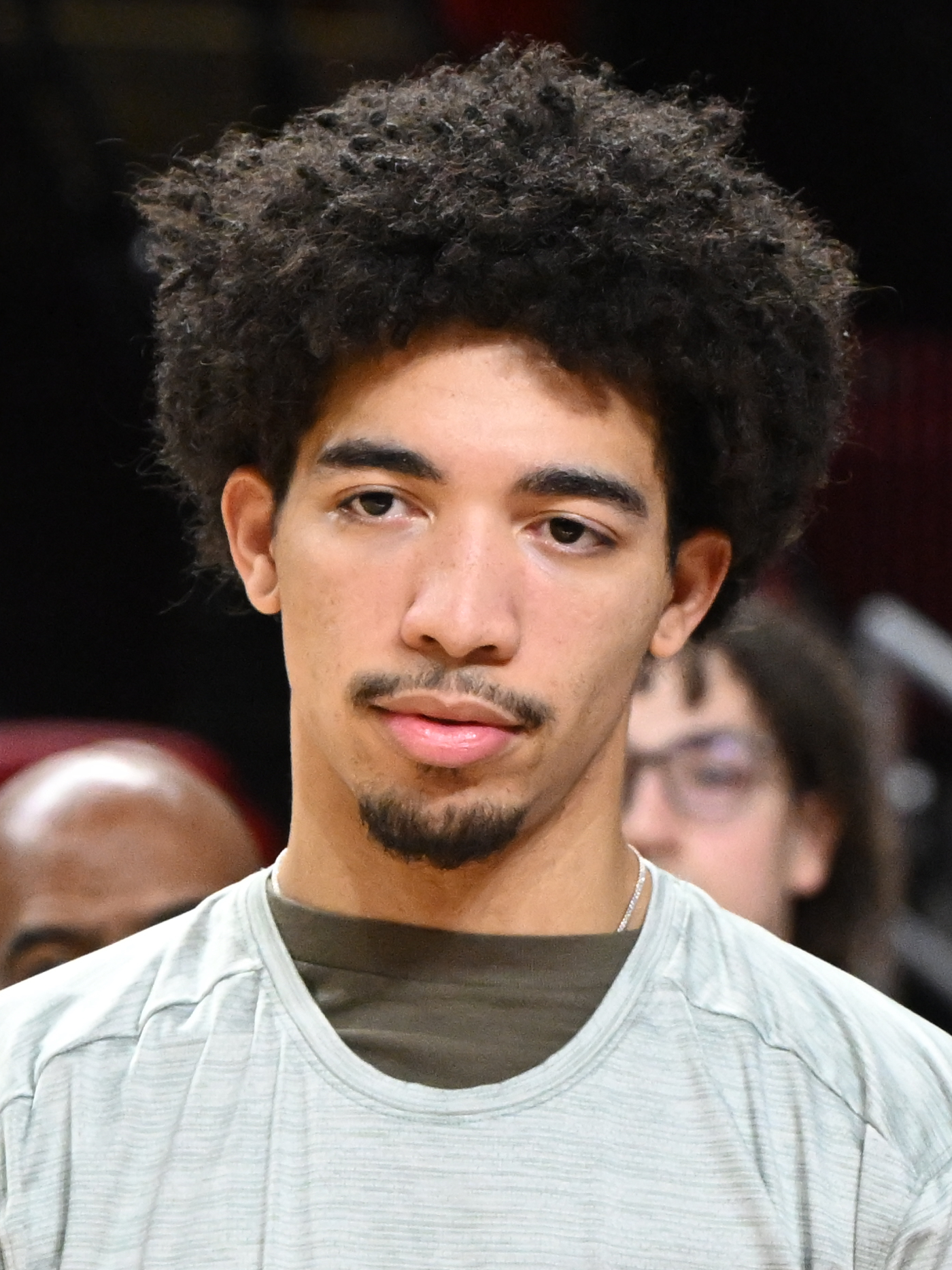
- Rice in 2026

Personal information
- Born: December 27, 2002 (age 23)
- Listed height: 6 ft 3 in (1.91 m)
- Listed weight: 180 lb (82 kg)

Career information
- High school: Sandy Creek (Tyrone, Georgia)
- College: Washington State (2023–2024); Indiana (2024–2025); Maryland (2025–2026)
- Position: Point guard

Career highlights
- First-team All-Pac-12 (2024); Pac-12 Freshman of the Year (2024); Pac-12 All-Freshman Team (2024)

Myles Rice (born December 27, 2002) is an American college basketball player. Rice last played for the Maryland Terrapins. He has also previously played for the Indiana Hoosiers, and the Washington State Cougars.

== Early life and high school ==
Coming out of high school, Rice was rated as a three-star recruit and committed to play college basketball for the Washington State Cougars.

== College career ==
=== Washington State ===
As a freshman in 2021-22, Rice took a redshirt. He missed the entire 2022-23 season after he was diagnosed with Hodgkin lymphoma. On November 6, 2023, Rice made his collegiate debut, putting up 13 points, four rebounds, and three assist in 29 minutes in a win over Idaho. On November 27, he dropped 28 points in a win over Eastern Washington. On January 18, 2024, Rice scored a career-high 35 points in a win over Stanford. On February 10, he tallied 21 points and a career-high nine rebounds in a win over Oregon. Rice finished the 2023-24 season averaging 14.8 points, 3.8 assists and 3.1 rebounds, and 1.6 steals per game, earning Pac-12 Freshman of the Year honors. After the season, he entered his name into the NCAA transfer portal.

=== Indiana ===
Rice transferred to play for the Indiana Hoosiers. On November 16, 2024, he totaled 23 points in a win over South Carolina.

=== Maryland ===
After one season with the Hoosiers, Rice transferred to play for the Maryland Terrapins. During the 2025–26 season, he appeared in 17 games and averaged 5.6 points, 2.1 rebounds, and 1.3 assists per game. These were the lowest season averages of his college career. He did not appear in the final 12 games of the season due to injury. After the season, he entered the transfer portal for the third time in three years.
