= 2023–24 Arizona State Sun Devils men's basketball team =

American college basketball season

2023–24 Arizona State Sun Devils men's basketball
- Conference: Pac-12 Conference
- Record: 14–18 (8–12 Pac–12)
- Head coach: Bobby Hurley (9th season)
- Associate head coach: Jermaine Kimbrough (3rd season)
- Assistant coaches: Greg Lansing (1st season); Nick Irvin (1st season); Yusuf Ali (1st season)
- Home arena: Desert Financial Arena

2023–24 Pac-12 Conference men's basketball standings
| | Conf. | | | | Overall |
| Team | W | | L | PCT | W | | L | PCT |
|---|---|---|---|---|---|---|---|---|
| No. 11 Arizona | 15 | – | 5 | .750 | 27 | – | 9 | .750 |
| No. 23 Washington State | 14 | – | 6 | .700 | 25 | – | 10 | .714 |
| Colorado | 13 | – | 7 | .650 | 26 | – | 11 | .703 |
| Oregon † | 12 | – | 8 | .600 | 24 | – | 12 | .667 |
| UCLA | 10 | – | 10 | .500 | 16 | – | 17 | .485 |
| Utah | 9 | – | 11 | .450 | 22 | – | 15 | .595 |
| California | 9 | – | 11 | .450 | 13 | – | 19 | .406 |
| Washington | 9 | – | 11 | .450 | 17 | – | 15 | .531 |
| USC | 8 | – | 12 | .400 | 15 | – | 18 | .455 |
| Stanford | 8 | – | 12 | .400 | 14 | – | 18 | .438 |
| Arizona State | 8 | – | 12 | .400 | 14 | – | 18 | .438 |
| Oregon State | 5 | – | 15 | .250 | 13 | – | 19 | .406 |
† 2024 Pac-12 tournament winner Rankings from AP Poll

The 2023–24 Arizona State Sun Devils men's basketball team represented Arizona State University during the 2023–24 NCAA Division I men's basketball season. The Sun Devils were led by ninth-year head coach Bobby Hurley, and played their home games at Desert Financial Arena in Tempe, Arizona. This was their last season as members of the Pac-12 Conference after 45 years, joining the Big 12 Conference in the 2024–25 season.

== Previous season ==
In the 2022–23 season, the Sun Devils went 23–12 overall and 11–9 in Pac-12 play to finish tied for 5th place. They lost to 2-seed Arizona in the quarterfinals of the Pac-12 tournament. They qualified for the NCAA Tournament, where they were an 11 seed selected to play in one of the four play-in games. They defeated Nevada, 98–73 in the First Four to get to the Round of 64 versus TCU, who they lost to 72–70.

== Off-season ==
=== Departures ===
| Name | Pos. | Height | Weight | Year | Hometown | Reason for departure | Sources |
|---|---|---|---|---|---|---|---|
| Warren Washington | C | 7'0" | 225 | Sr. | Los Angeles, California | Transferred to Texas Tech | |
| Duke Brennan | C | 6'10" | 235 | Fr. | Gilbert, Arizona | Transferred to Grand Canyon | |
| Malcolm Flaggs | G | 6'6" | 210 | Fr. | Gilbert, Arizona | Transferred to Grand Canyon | |
| Desmond Cambridge Jr. | G | 6'4" | 180 | GS | Nashville, Tennessee | Exhausted eligibility | |
| Devan Cambridge | G/F | 6'6" | 215 | Sr. | Nashville, Tennessee | Transferred to Texas Tech | |
| Marcus Bagley | F | 6'8" | 215 | RS So. | Sacramento, California | Declared for 2023 NBA draft | |
| Austin Nunez | G | 6'2" | 170 | Fr. | Garden Ridge, Texas | Transferred to Ole Miss | |
| Luther Muhammad | G | 6'3" | 195 | GS | Newark, New Jersey | Exhausted eligibility | |
| Enoch Boakye | C | 6'10" | 240 | So. | Brampton, Ontario | Transferred to Fresno State | |
| DJ Horne | G | 6'1" | 175 | Sr. | Raleigh, North Carolina | Transferred to NC State | |
| John Olmsted | F/C | 6'10" | 235 | Sr. | Morenci, Arizona | Transferred to Montana State | |

=== Incoming transfers ===
| Name | Pos. | Height | Weight | Year | Previous school | Notes |
|---|---|---|---|---|---|---|
| Adam Miller | G | 6'3" | 190 | RS Jr. | LSU | Spent first season at Illinois. Needed a waiver for immediate eligibility. Three seasons of eligibility remaining. |
| Zane Meeks | F/C | 6'9" | 220 | GS | San Francisco | Spent first two seasons at Nevada. Immediately eligible as a grad transfer. |
| Shawn Phillips | C | 7'0" | 250 | So. | LSU | Three seasons of eligibility remaining. |
| Bryant Selebangue | F/C | 6'8" | 237 | Sr. | Tulsa | Spent first two seasons at Hutchinson Community College and Florida SouthWestern State College. Two seasons of eligibility remaining. |
| Brycen Long | G | 6'2" | 175 | Sr. | Houston Christian | Two seasons of eligibility remaining. |
| Jose Perez | G | 6'5" | 220 | GS | West Virginia | Spent first two seasons at Gardner-Webb, one season at Marquette and one season at Manhattan. Immediately eligible as a grad transfer. |
| Kamari Lands | G/F | 6'8" | 220 | So. | Louisville | Three seasons of eligibility remaining. |
| Malachi Davis | G | 6'4" | 175 | Sr. | Tallahassee Community College | Spent first two seasons at Lake Land College. Two seasons of eligibility remaining. |

=== 2023 recruiting class ===
College recruiting
| Name | Hometown | School | Height | Weight | Commit date |
|---|---|---|---|---|---|
| Akil Watson; G/F | Middletown, N.Y. | Roselle Catholic | 6 ft 8 in (2.03 m) | 205 lb (93 kg) | Sep 7, 2022 |
| Akil Watson; G/F | Recruit ratings: Scout: Rivals: 247Sports: ESPN: (81) | | | | |
| Braelon Green; G | Ypsilanti, MI | Southern California Academy | 6 ft 3 in (1.91 m) | 175 lb (79 kg) | Sep 24, 2022 |
| Braelon Green; G | Recruit ratings: Scout: Rivals: 247Sports: ESPN: (82) | | | | |
Overall recruit ranking:
Note: In many cases, Scout, Rivals, 247Sports, On3, and ESPN may conflict in their listings of height and weight.; In these cases, the average was taken. ESPN grades are on a 100-point scale.; Sources:

== Roster ==
2023–24 Arizona State Sun Devils men's basketball team
Players
Coaches

| Pos. | # | Name | Height | Weight | Year | Previous school | Hometown |
|---|---|---|---|---|---|---|---|
| G/F | 0 | Kamari Lands | 6 ft 8 in (2.03 m) | 220 lb (100 kg) | So | Louisville | Indianapolis, Indiana |
| G | 1 | Frankie Collins | 6 ft 1 in (1.85 m) | 185 lb (84 kg) | Jr | Michigan | Sacramento, California |
| G | 2 | Braelon Green | 6 ft 3 in (1.91 m) | 185 lb (84 kg) | Fr | Southern California Academy | Southfield, Michigan |
| G | 3 | Brycen Long | 6 ft 2 in (1.88 m) | 180 lb (82 kg) | Sr | Houston Christian | Gilbert, Arizona |
| G/F | 5 | Jamiya Neal | 6 ft 6 in (1.98 m) | 185 lb (84 kg) | Jr | Phoenix Hillcrest Prep | Toledo, Ohio |
| G | 7 | Malachi Davis | 6 ft 4 in (1.93 m) | 175 lb (79 kg) | Sr | Tallahassee Community College | Toronto, Ontario |
| F | 8 | Alonzo Gaffney | 6 ft 9 in (2.06 m) | 200 lb (91 kg) | GS | Northwest Florida State College | Cleveland, Ohio |
| C | 9 | Shawn Phillips | 7 ft 0 in (2.13 m) | 245 lb (111 kg) | So | LSU | Dayton, Ohio |
| G | 11 | Bobby Hurley (W) | 6 ft 0 in (1.83 m) | 160 lb (73 kg) | Jr | Notre Dame Prep | Scottsdale, Arizona |
| G | 12 | Jose Perez | 6 ft 5 in (1.96 m) | 220 lb (100 kg) | GS | West Virginia | Bronx, New York |
| G | 14 | Andrew Mayock (W) | 6 ft 2 in (1.88 m) | 180 lb (82 kg) | Fr | Northfield Mount Hermon School | New Canaan, CT |
| F | 15 | Zane Meeks | 6 ft 9 in (2.06 m) | 220 lb (100 kg) | GS | San Francisco | Prairie Village, Kansas |
| G | 20 | Zack Markus (W) | 6 ft 0 in (1.83 m) | 180 lb (82 kg) | So | Wilson Central High School | Mt. Juliet, Tennessee |
| F | 23 | Akil Watson | 6 ft 9 in (2.06 m) | 205 lb (93 kg) | Fr | Roselle Catholic High School | Middletown, New York |
| F | 24 | Bryant Selebangue | 6 ft 8 in (2.03 m) | 225 lb (102 kg) | Sr | Tulsa | Montreal, Quebec |
| G | 25 | Jordan Williams (W) | 5 ft 10 in (1.78 m) | 195 lb (88 kg) | Jr | AZ Compass Prep | Los Angeles, California |
| G | 44 | Adam Miller | 6 ft 3 in (1.91 m) | 190 lb (86 kg) | RS Jr | LSU | Peoria, Illinois |

Head coach

- Bobby Hurley (Duke)

Assistant coach(es)

- Jermaine Kimbrough (Virginia Tech)
- Greg Lansing (South Dakota)
- Nick Irvin (Shaw)
- Yusuf Ali (Laurentian University)

Legend

- (C) Team captain
- (S) Suspended
- (I) Ineligible
- (W) Walk-on
- Injured
- Current redshirt

Roster

== Schedule and results ==
| Date time, TV | Rank^{#} | Opponent^{#} | Result | Record | High points | High rebounds | High assists | Site (attendance) city, state |
Non-conference regular season
| November 8, 2023*; 7:30 p.m., Barstool.TV | | vs. Mississippi State; Barstool Sports Invitational | L 56–71 | 0–1 | 13 – Lands | 5 – Phillips | 4 – Neal | Wintrust Arena (5,361); Chicago, IL |
| November 11, 2023*; 1:30 p.m., P12N | | Texas Southern | W 63–52 | 1–1 | 13 – Collins | 8 – Collins | 6 – Collins | Desert Financial Arena (7,263); Tempe, AZ |
| November 16, 2023*; 7:00 p.m., P12N | | UMass Lowell | W 71–69 | 2–1 | 20 – Perez | 7 – Gaffney | 4 – Perez | Desert Financial Arena (6,857); Tempe, AZ |
| November 23, 2023*; 10:30 p.m., ESPN2 | | vs. BYU; Vegas Showdown semifinals | L 49–77 | 2–2 | 13 – Neal | 7 – Collins | 2 – Perez | Michelob Ultra Arena (2,223); Paradise, NV |
| November 24, 2023*; 6:00 p.m., ESPN2 | | vs. Vanderbilt; Vegas Showdown 3rd place game | W 82–67 | 3–2 | 19 – Gaffney | 7 – Neal | 4 – Perez | Michelob Ultra Arena (–); Paradise, NV |
| November 29, 2023*; 7:00 p.m., P12N | | Sam Houston | W 78–61 | 4–2 | 24 – Perez | 8 – Tied | 7 – Collins | Desert Financial Arena (6,090); Tempe, AZ |
| December 3, 2023*; 1:00 p.m., P12N | | San Francisco | W 72–61 | 5–2 | 21 – Collins | 11 – Neal | 4 – Neal | Desert Financial Arena (6,563); Tempe, AZ |
| December 6, 2023*; 8:00 p.m., FS1 | | SMU | W 76–74 | 6–2 | 20 – Perez | 8 – Neal | 3 – Perez | Desert Financial Arena (6,812); Tempe, AZ |
| December 9, 2023*; 8:30 p.m., CBSSN | | at San Diego | L 84–89 | 6–3 | 20 – Neal | 9 – Collins | 7 – Perez | Jenny Craig Pavilion (1,102); San Diego, CA |
| December 16, 2023*; 7:00 p.m., ESPNU | | vs. TCU; USLBM Coast-to-Coast Challenge | L 59–79 | 6–4 | 20 – Miller | 6 – Tied | 3 – Tied | Dickies Arena (4,890); Fort Worth, TX |
| December 20, 2023*; 6:30 p.m., ESPN2 | | vs. Northwestern; Jerry Colangelo Hall of Fame Series | L 46–65 | 6–5 | 10 – Collins | 7 – Selebangue | 4 – Collins | Footprint Center (–); Phoenix, AZ |
Pac-12 regular season
| December 29, 2023; 9:00 p.m., ESPN2 | | at Stanford | W 76–73 | 7–5 (1–0) | 13 – Tied | 6 – Neal | 4 – Miller | Maples Pavilion (2,801); Stanford, CA |
| December 31, 2023; 6:00 p.m., P12N | | at California | W 71–69 | 8–5 (2–0) | 25 – Collins | 6 – Neal | 2 – Neal | Haas Pavilion (2,429); Berkeley, CA |
| January 4, 2024; 9:00 p.m., ESPN2 | | Utah | W 82–70 | 9–5 (3–0) | 26 – Perez | 7 – Tied | 6 – Collins | Desert Financial Arena (6,259); Tempe, AZ |
| January 6, 2024; 6:00 pm, ESPNU | | Colorado | W 76–73 | 10–5 (4–0) | 19 – Neal | 7 – Neal | 4 – Tied | Desert Financial Arena (8,128); Tempe, AZ |
| January 11, 2024; 9:00 p.m., FS1 | | at Washington | L 67–82 | 10–6 (4–1) | 14 – Neal | 7 – Collins | 5 – Collins | Alaska Airlines Arena (5,641); Seattle, WA |
| January 17, 2024; 7:00 p.m., P12N | | UCLA | L 66–68 | 10–7 (4–2) | 16 – Tied | 6 – Miller | 3 – Neal | Desert Financial Arena (10,096); Tempe, AZ |
| January 20, 2024; 12:00 p.m., FOX | | USC | W 82–67 | 11–7 (5–2) | 20 – Perez | 13 – Selebangue | 7 – Collins | Desert Financial Arena (13,743); Tempe, AZ |
| January 25, 2024; 7:00 p.m., P12N | | at Oregon | L 61–80 | 11–8 (5–3) | 20 – Perez | 9 – Neal | 4 – Perez | Matthew Knight Arena (6,170); Eugene, OR |
| January 27, 2024; 5:00 p.m., P12N | | at Oregon State | L 71–84 | 11–9 (5–4) | 19 – Perez | 5 – Tied | 3 – Tied | Gill Coliseum (3,842); Corvallis, OR |
| February 1, 2024; 7:00 p.m., ESPN2 | | Stanford | L 62–71 | 11–10 (5–5) | 14 – Perez | 7 – Gaffney | 6 – Perez | Desert Financial Arena (7,234); Tempe, AZ |
| February 3, 2024; 1:00 p.m., P12N | | California | L 66–81 | 11–11 (5–6) | 14 – Tied | 7 – Phillips | 3 – Neal | Desert Financial Arena (7,901); Tempe, AZ |
| February 8, 2024; 6:00 p.m., FS1 | | at Colorado | L 70–82 | 11–12 (5–7) | 18 – Collins | 6 – Gaffney | 4 – Neal | CU Events Center (7,109); Boulder, CO |
| February 10, 2024; 6:00 p.m., ESPN2 | | at Utah | W 85–77 | 12–12 (6–7) | 21 – Perez | 8 – Neal | 5 – Collins | Jon M. Huntsman Center (8,235); Salt Lake City, UT |
| February 14, 2024; 7:00 p.m., P12N | | Oregon State | W 79–61 | 13–12 (7–7) | 21 – Neal | 5 – Gaffney | 5 – Miller | Desert Financial Arena (6,689); Tempe, AZ |
| February 17, 2024; 7:30 p.m., FS1 | | at No. 5 Arizona; Rivalry | L 60–105 | 13–13 (7–8) | 16 – Miller | 6 – Neal | 2 – Tied | McKale Center (14,688); Tucson, AZ |
| February 22, 2024; 7:00 p.m., ESPN2 | | Washington | L 82–84 ^{OT} | 13–14 (7–9) | 21 – Collins | 8 – Tied | 5 – Neal | Desert Financial Arena (7,401); Tempe, AZ |
| February 24, 2024; 6:00 p.m., ESPN2 | | No. 21 Washington State | W 73–61 | 14–14 (8–9) | 16 – Perez | 7 – Selebangue | 4 – Perez | Desert Financial Arena (9,586); Tempe, AZ |
| February 28, 2024; 8:00 p.m., P12N | | No. 6 Arizona; Rivalry/Senior Night | L 67–85 | 14–15 (8–10) | 16 – Miller | 5 – Tied | 3 – Collins | Desert Financial Arena (14,229); Tempe, AZ |
| March 7, 2024; 9:00 p.m., FS1 | | at USC | L 73–81 | 14–16 (8–11) | 24 – Perez | 4 – Miller | 6 – Collins | Galen Center (6,834); Los Angeles, CA |
| March 9, 2024; 9:00 p.m., FS1 | | at UCLA | L 47–59 | 14–17 (8–12) | 13 – Miller | 8 – Neal | 3 – Gaffney | Pauley Pavilion (7,424); Los Angeles, CA |
Pac-12 Tournament
| March 13, 2024; 8:30 p.m., P12N | (11) | vs. (6) Utah; First round | L 57–90 | 14–18 | 20 – Collins | 8 – Selebangue | 2 – Neal | T-Mobile Arena (10,133); Paradise, NV |
*Non-conference game. ^{#}Rankings from AP Poll. (#) Tournament seedings in parentheses. All times are in Mountain Time.
