= 2023–24 Oregon State Beavers men's basketball team =

American college basketball season

2023–24 Oregon State Beavers men's basketball
- Conference: Pac-12 Conference
- Record: 13–19 (5–15 Pac-12)
- Head coach: Wayne Tinkle (10th season)
- Associate head coach: Eric Reveno (2nd season)
- Assistant coaches: Marlon Stewart (5th season); Stephen Thompson (9th season)
- Home arena: Gill Coliseum

2023–24 Pac-12 Conference men's basketball standings
	Conf.				Overall
Team	W		L	PCT	W		L	PCT
No. 11 Arizona	15	–	5	.750	27	–	9	.750
No. 23 Washington State	14	–	6	.700	25	–	10	.714
Colorado	13	–	7	.650	26	–	11	.703
Oregon †	12	–	8	.600	24	–	12	.667
UCLA	10	–	10	.500	16	–	17	.485
Utah	9	–	11	.450	22	–	15	.595
California	9	–	11	.450	13	–	19	.406
Washington	9	–	11	.450	17	–	15	.531
USC	8	–	12	.400	15	–	18	.455
Stanford	8	–	12	.400	14	–	18	.438
Arizona State	8	–	12	.400	14	–	18	.438
Oregon State	5	–	15	.250	13	–	19	.406
† 2024 Pac-12 tournament winner Rankings from AP Poll

The 2023–24 Oregon State Beavers men's basketball team represented Oregon State University in the 2023–24 NCAA Division I men's basketball season. The Beavers were led by tenth-year head coach Wayne Tinkle, and played their home games at Gill Coliseum in Corvallis, Oregon, as members of the Pac-12 Conference; it was their final season in the Pac-12 before they joined the West Coast Conference as an affiliate member for the next two years.

== Previous season ==
The Beavers finished the 2022–23 season 11–21, 5–15 in Pac-12 play to finish in eleventh place. They lost to Arizona State in the first round of the Pac-12 tournament.

== Off-season ==
=== Departures ===
Name	Num	Pos.	Height	Weight	Year	Hometown	Reason for departure
Nick Krass	2	G	6'4"	190	Freshman	Gulfport, MS	Transferred to Mississippi Gulf Coast CC
Dzimtry Ryuny	11	F	6'9"	205	Senior	Minsk, Belrus	Graduated
Rodrigue Andela	34	F	6'8"	250	RS senior	Yaoundé, Cameroon	Graduated
Glenn Taylor Jr.	35	F	6'6"	200	Sophomore	Las Vegas, NV	Transferred to St. John's

=== Incoming transfers ===
Name	Num	Pos.	Height	Weight	Year	Hometown	Previous school
Nate Meithof	13	G	6'5"		Junior	Salem, OR	College of Southern Idaho

=== 2023 recruiting class ===
College recruiting
Name	Hometown	School	Height	Weight	Commit date
Dajohn Craig; PG	Indianapolis, IN	Lawrence Central High School	6 ft 1 in (1.85 m)	N/A	
Dajohn Craig; PG	Recruit ratings: Rivals: ESPN: (NR)				
Gavin Marrs; PF	Ellensburg, WA	Ellensburg High School	6 ft 12 in (2.13 m)	200 lb (91 kg)	Sep 27, 2022
Gavin Marrs; PF	Recruit ratings: Rivals: 247Sports: ESPN: (NR)				
Thomas Ndong; PF	Montreal, QC	NBA Academy Latin America	6 ft 10 in (2.08 m)	N/A	Nov 15, 2022
Thomas Ndong; PF	Recruit ratings: Rivals: 247Sports: ESPN: (NR)				
Overall recruit ranking:
Note: In many cases, Scout, Rivals, 247Sports, On3, and ESPN may conflict in their listings of height and weight.; In these cases, the average was taken. ESPN grades are on a 100-point scale.; Sources: "2023 Basketball Player Commits". ESPN.; "2023 Team Ranking". Rivals.

== Roster ==
2023–24 Oregon State Beavers men's basketball team
Players
Coaches

Pos.	#	Name	Height	Weight	Year	Previous school	Hometown
G	0	Jordan Pope	6 ft 2 in (1.88 m)	165 lb (75 kg)	So	Prolific Prep	Oakley, California
G	1	Christian Wright	6 ft 3 in (1.91 m)	185 lb (84 kg)	Jr	Georgia	Alpharetta, Georgia
G	2	Josiah Lake (W)	6 ft 2 in (1.88 m)	—	Fr	Tualatin HS	Tualatin, Oregon
F	3	Gavin Marrs	7 ft 0 in (2.13 m)	200 lb (91 kg)	Fr	Ellensburg HS	Ellensburg, Washington
G/F	4	Dexter Akanno	6 ft 5 in (1.96 m)	210 lb (95 kg)	RS Sr	Marquette	Valencia, California
G	5	Justin Rochelin	6 ft 5 in (1.96 m)	205 lb (93 kg)	RS So	Arizona State	Encino, California
G	10	Grey Garrison (W)	6 ft 7 in (2.01 m)	—	Fr	Sehome HS	Bellingham, Washington
G	11	DaJohn Craig	6 ft 1 in (1.85 m)	—	Fr	Lawrence Central HS	Indianapolis, Indiana
F	12	Michael Rataj	6 ft 9 in (2.06 m)	220 lb (100 kg)	So	Ratiopharm Ulm	Augsburg, Germany
G	13	Nate Meithof (injured)	6 ft 5 in (1.96 m)	190 lb (86 kg)	Jr	College of Southern Idaho	Salem, Oregon
F	14	Jayden Stevens	6 ft 7 in (2.01 m)	190 lb (86 kg)	So	Gonzaga Prep	Spokane, Washington
C	15	Chol Marial	7 ft 2 in (2.18 m)	235 lb (107 kg)	RS Sr	Maryland	Rumbek, South Sudan
G	22	Thomas Ndong	6 ft 10 in (2.08 m)	—	Fr	NBA Academy Latin America	Montreal, Quebec
F	23	Felipe Palazzo (W)	6 ft 4 in (1.93 m)	200 lb (91 kg)	So	Colegio Nueva Concepción	San Miguel de Tucumán, Argentina
C	24	KC Ibekwe	6 ft 10 in (2.08 m)	287 lb (130 kg)	So	Centennial Academy	Coquitlam, British Columbia
F	34	Tyler Bilodeau	6 ft 9 in (2.06 m)	220 lb (100 kg)	So	Kamiakin HS	Kennewick, Washington

Head coach

- Wayne Tinkle (Montana)

Assistant coach(es)

- Eric Reveno (Stanford)
- Marlon Stewart (North Dakota)
- Stephen Thompson (Syracuse)

Legend

- (C) Team captain
- (S) Suspended
- (I) Ineligible
- (W) Walk-on
- Injured
- Current redshirt

Roster

== Schedule and results ==
Date time, TV	Rank^{#}	Opponent^{#}	Result	Record	High points	High rebounds	High assists	Site (attendance) city, state
Exhibition
October 29, 2023*; 5:00 p.m.		Southern Oregon	W 84–61	–	15 – Bilodeau	6 – Bilodeau	5 – Pope	Gill Coliseum (2,107); Corvallis, OR
Non-conference regular season
November 6, 2023*; 2:30 p.m., P12N		Linfield	W 82–46	1–0	16 – Pope	7 – Bilodeau	7 – Lake	Gill Coliseum (2,483); Corvallis, OR
November 10, 2023*; 4:00 p.m., P12N		Troy	W 81–80 ^{2OT}	2–0	18 – Tied	12 – Bilodeau	3 – Wright	Gill Coliseum (2,934); Corvallis, OR
November 14, 2023*; 7:00 p.m., P12N		Appalachian State	W 81–71 ^{OT}	3–0	25 – Pope	9 – Bilodeau	5 – Pope	Gill Coliseum (2,766); Corvallis, OR
November 18, 2023*; 1:00 p.m., Peacock		vs. Nebraska	L 63–84	3–1	25 – Pope	7 – Bilodeau	3 – Pope	Sanford Pentagon (2,938); Sioux Falls, SD
November 22, 2023*; 4:00 p.m., ESPN2		vs. No. 13 Baylor; NIT Season Tip-Off semifinals	L 72–88	3–2	16 – Akanno	7 – Rataj	3 – Tied	Barclays Center (2,757); Brooklyn, NY
November 24, 2023*; 12:00 p.m., ESPN2		vs. Pittsburgh; NIT Season Tip-Off 3rd place game	L 51–76	3–3	12 – Akanno	6 – Ibekwe	4 – Pope	Barclays Center (–); Brooklyn, NY
November 30, 2023*; 7:00 p.m., P12N		UC Davis	W 71–59	4–3	18 – Marial	10 – Marial	2 – Tied	Gill Coliseum (2,757); Corvallis, OR
December 4, 2023*; 7:00 p.m., P12N		Cal Poly	W 70–63 ^{2OT}	5–3	18 – Rataj	10 – Rataj	3 – Wright	Gill Coliseum (2,568); Corvallis, OR
December 9, 2023*; 2:00 p.m., P12N		Utah Valley	W 74–71	6–3	19 – Bilodeau	11 – Rataj	5 – Lake	Gill Coliseum (2,867); Corvallis, OR
December 17, 2023*; 12:00 p.m., P12N		UTSA	W 66–65	7–3	19 – Pope	8 – Rataj	4 – Tied	Gill Coliseum (2,440); Corvallis, OR
December 21, 2023*; 4:00 p.m., P12N		Idaho State	W 76–57	8–3	25 – Pope	8 – Ibekwe	8 – Pope	Gill Coliseum (2,576); Corvallis, OR
Pac-12 regular season
December 28, 2023; 7:00 p.m., P12N		UCLA	L 62–69	8–4 (0–1)	22 – Akanno	14 – Bilodeau	4 – Pope	Gill Coliseum (3,087); Corvallis, OR
December 30, 2023; 7:00 p.m., P12N		USC	W 86–70	9–4 (1–1)	26 – Bilodeau	5 – Tied	6 – Pope	Gill Coliseum (4,318); Corvallis, OR
January 4, 2024; 8:00 p.m., P12N		at Washington State	L 58–65	9–5 (1–2)	20 – Pope	8 – Ibekwe	2 – Pope	Beasley Coliseum (2,524); Pullman, WA
January 6, 2024; 3:00 p.m., P12N		at Washington	L 72–79	9–6 (1–3)	29 – Pope	7 – Bilodeau	5 – Pope	Alaska Airlines Arena (7,376); Seattle, WA
January 11, 2024; 8:00 p.m., ESPN2		Stanford	L 84–88 ^{OT}	9–7 (1–4)	21 – Pope	9 – Rataj	5 – Pope	Gill Coliseum (3,423); Corvallis, OR
January 18, 2024; 6:00 p.m., ESPNU		at Utah	L 47–74	9–8 (1–5)	12 – Akanno	5 – Rataj	3 – Pope	CU Events Center (8,063); Boulder, CO
January 20, 2024; 4:00 p.m., P12N		at Colorado	L 57–90	9–9 (1–6)	18 – Bilodeau	6 – Rataj	2 – Tied	CU Events Center (7,944); Boulder, CO
January 25, 2024; 8:00 p.m., P12N		No. 9 Arizona	W 83–80	10–9 (2–6)	31 – Pope	7 – Tied	5 – Pope	Gill Coliseum (4,239); Corvallis, OR
January 27, 2024; 4:00 p.m., P12N		Arizona State	W 84–71	11–9 (3–6)	19 – Pope	10 – Rataj	6 – Pope	Gill Coliseum (3,842); Corvallis, OR
February 1, 2024; 7:30 p.m., P12N		at UCLA	L 63–71	11–10 (3–7)	18 – Bilodeau	6 – Tied	2 – Rataj	Pauley Pavilion (6,095); Los Angeles, CA
February 3, 2024; 4:00 p.m., P12N		at USC	L 54–82	11–11 (3–8)	14 – Pope	4 – Lake	4 – Akanno	Galen Center (6,541); Los Angeles, CA
February 8, 2024; 7:00 p.m., P12N		Washington State	L 58–64	11–12 (3–9)	12 – Pope	6 – Ibekwe	3 – Akanno	Gill Coliseum (3,562); Corvallis, OR
February 10, 2024; 4:00 p.m., P12N		Washington	L 55–67	11–13 (3–10)	19 – Pope	8 – Rataj	4 – Pope	Gill Coliseum (3,675); Corvallis, OR
February 14, 2024; 6:00 p.m., P12N		at Arizona State	L 61–79	11–14 (3–11)	21 – Bilodeau	8 – Rataj	4 – Tied	Desert Financial Arena (6,689); Tempe, AZ
February 17, 2024; 7:00 p.m., P12N		Oregon; Rivalry	L 58–60	11–15 (3–11)	17 – Rataj	9 – Rataj	4 – Pope	Gill Coliseum (7,574); Corvallis, OR
February 22, 2024; 7:00 p.m., P12N		at California	L 73–81	11–16 (3–13)	23 – Pope	10 – Bilodeau	4 – Pope	Haas Pavilion (3,012); Berkeley, CA
February 24, 2024; 2:00 p.m., P12N		at Stanford	W 85–73	12–16 (4–13)	30 – Pope	10 – Rataj	2 – Tied	Maples Pavilion (3,755); Stanford, CA
February 28, 2024; 8:00 p.m., FS1		at Oregon; Rivalry	L 71–78	12–17 (4–14)	26 – Bilodeau	8 – Bilodeau	5 – Pope	Matthew Knight Arena (8,365); Eugene, OR
March 7, 2024; 8:00 p.m., ESPNU		Utah	W 92–85	13–17 (5–14)	24 – Pope	7 – Rataj	4 – Pope	Gill Coliseum (3,362); Corvallis, OR
March 9, 2024; 2:00 p.m., P12N		Colorado; Senior Night	L 57–73	13–18 (5–15)	15 – Akanno	7 – Tied	3 – Pope	Gill Coliseum (3,172); Corvallis, OR
Pac-12 tournament
March 13, 2024; 2:30 p.m., P12N	(12)	vs. (5) UCLA; First round	L 57–67	13–19	16 – Pope	7 – Rochelin	3 – Pope	T-Mobile Arena (10,050); Paradise, NV
*Non-conference game. ^{#}Rankings from AP Poll. (#) Tournament seedings in parentheses. All times are in Pacific Time.
