= Dejuan Clayton =

American basketball player (born 1997)

DeJuan Clayton
No. 3 – Waverley Falcons
- Position: Guard
- League: NBL1 South

Personal information
- Born: May 18, 1997 (age 29) Washington, D.C., U.S.
- Listed height: 6 ft 2 in (1.88 m)
- Listed weight: 190 lb (86 kg)

Career information
- High school: St John College School
- College: Coppin State (2016–2021); Hartford (2021–2022); California (2022–2023); Manhattan College (2023–2024)
- NBA draft: 2024: undrafted
- Playing career: 2025–present

Career history
- 2025-present: Waverley Falcons

DeJuan Clayton (born May 18, 1997) is an American professional basketball player. He played college basketball for Coppin State University, University of Hartford, University of California, and Manhattan College.

== Early life and high school ==
Clayton attended St Johns College High School in Washington DC. He averaged 7.9 points per game and was part of the 2016 WCAC Championship team. He earned an honorable mention on the 2016 WCAC All-Conference Boys Team. Clayton played AAU for Team Takeover.

== College career ==
=== Coppin State University (2016-2021) ===
Clayton picked Coppin State University over an offer from Morgan State University and started 23 games as a freshman while averaging 12 points per game. As a sophomore, he suffered a season-ending injury after six games. He then returned to full health and played back to back all-MEAC seasons where he graduated from Coppin State in 2020 with a degree in social science.

On January 23, 2017, Clayton was selected as MEAC Men's Basketball Co-Player of the Week and Co-Rookie of the Week. He had scored a career-high 28 points against Howard University. On March 3, Clayton was named to the 2016-2017 MEAC All-Rookie Team. Clayton was named to the 2018-2019 Preseason third-team All-MEAC team. He had earned Third-Team All-MEAC selection for the second straight season. On January 8, 2019, Clayton was named the MEAC Men's Basketball Player of the Week for the second time. Clayton was named to the MEAC All-Conference Team. He received Second Team honors.

In November 2019, Clayton recorded a game high 21 points with a career high four 3-pointers and became the 23rd player in school history to record 1,000 points.

On January 25, 2021, Clayton was named the BOXTOROW National Player of the Week for the first time.

=== University of Hartford (2021-2022) ===
On April 21, 2021, Clayton transferred to University of Hartford after finishing his redshirt senior year at Coppin State. He averaged just under 15 points and 5 assists per game. He left Coppin ranked 5th in scoring with 1,518 points and third in assists with 418.

After two games, Clayton suffered a shoulder injury and missed the remainder of the season.

=== University of California (2022-2023) ===
On June 1, 2022, Clayton transferred to University of California for the 2022-2023 season, enrolling in their graduate certificate program and using his last year of eligibility.

Clayton missed the season's first 13 games with an injury, then played in nine games before being shut down for the season with an undisclosed illness.

In April 2023, Clayton entered the transfer portal seeking an eighth season of eligibility after playing eight games with the Bears and averaged 9 points and 3 assists per game.

=== Manhattan College (2023-2024) ===
In February 2024, Clayton played in his season debut for Manhattan College against Marist College where he became the first D1 men's basketball player to play in eight different seasons.

== Personal life ==
Clayton is the son of Renita Springs and Derrick Clayton.
