= Keion Brooks Jr. =

American basketball player (born 2000)

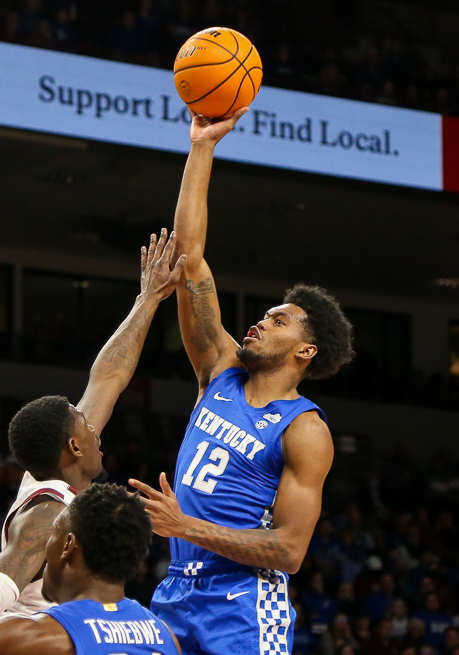
- Brooks with Kentucky in 2022

No. 8 – Noblesville Boom
- Position: Small forward / power forward
- League: NBA G League

Personal information
- Born: August 7, 2000 (age 26) Fort Wayne, Indiana, U.S.
- Listed height: 6 ft 7 in (2.01 m)
- Listed weight: 210 lb (95 kg)

Career information
- High school: North Side (Fort Wayne, Indiana); La Lumiere (La Porte, Indiana)
- College: Kentucky (2019–2022); Washington (2022–2024)
- NBA draft: 2024: undrafted
- Playing career: 2024–present

Career history
- 2024–2025: Birmingham Squadron
- 2025: New Orleans Pelicans
- 2025–2026: Birmingham Squadron
- 2026–present: Noblesville Boom

Career highlights
- First-team All-Pac-12 (2024); Second-team All-Pac-12 (2023)
- Stats at NBA.com
- Stats at Basketball Reference

Keion Lee Brooks Jr. (born August 7, 2000) is an American professional basketball player for the Noblesville Boom of the NBA G League. He played college basketball for Kentucky and Washington.

== High school career ==
Brooks played basketball for North Side High School in Fort Wayne, Indiana. As a sophomore, he averaged 20.5 points and 7.4 rebounds per game, leading his team to the Class 4A state title game. For his senior season, Brooks transferred to La Lumiere School in La Porte, Indiana. He played alongside future NBA player Isaiah Stewart and helped his team to a GEICO Nationals runner-up finish. As a senior, Brooks averaged 20.1 points and 7.5 rebounds per game. He was selected to play in the Jordan Brand Classic.

=== Recruiting ===
Brooks was considered a five-star recruit by Rivals and 247Sports, and a four-star recruit by ESPN. On March 15, 2019, he committed to playing college basketball for Kentucky over offers from Indiana, Michigan State and North Carolina.

College recruiting
Name	Hometown	School	Height	Weight	Commit date
Keion Brooks Jr. SF	Fort Wayne, IN	La Lumiere (IN)	6 ft 7 in (2.01 m)	200 lb (91 kg)	Mar 15, 2019
Keion Brooks Jr. SF	Recruit ratings: Rivals: 247Sports: ESPN: (89)				
Overall recruit ranking: Rivals: 29 247Sports: 14 ESPN: 36
Note: In many cases, Scout, Rivals, 247Sports, On3, and ESPN may conflict in their listings of height and weight.; In these cases, the average was taken. ESPN grades are on a 100-point scale.; Sources: "Kentucky 2019 Basketball Commitments". Rivals.; "2019 Kentucky Wildcats Recruiting Class". ESPN.; "2019 Team Ranking". Rivals.

== College career ==
=== Kentucky ===
As a freshman at Kentucky, Brooks averaged 4.5 points and 3.2 rebounds per game. He missed the first nine games of his sophomore season with a leg injury. On February 6, 2021, Brooks posted a season-high 23 points and 11 rebounds in an 82–71 loss to Tennessee. As a sophomore, he averaged 10.3 points, 6.8 rebounds and 1.6 assists per game. On January 29, 2022, Brooks scored a career-high 27 points in an 80–62 victory against Kansas. As a junior, he averaged 10.8 points and 4.4 rebounds per game. On April 4, 2022, Brooks declared for the 2022 NBA draft while maintaining his college eligibility.

=== Washington ===
Instead of returning to Kentucky, Brooks decided to enter the transfer portal. On June 6, 2022, Brooks committed to the University of Washington. He averaged 17.7 points, 6.7 rebounds and 1.2 blocks per game as a senior. Brooks returned for his fifth season of eligibility. After averaging 21.1 points and 6.8 rebounds, Brooks was named to the First Team All-Pac-12 at the conclusion of the regular season.

== Professional career ==
=== New Orleans Pelicans / Birmingham Squadron (2024–2025) ===
After going undrafted in the 2024 NBA draft, Brooks joined the New Orleans Pelicans for the 2024 NBA Summer League and on September 24, 2024, he signed with the team. However, Brooks was waived on October 16 and on October 28, he joined the Birmingham Squadron.

On January 9, 2025, Brooks signed a two-way contract with the Pelicans. He made his NBA debut on February 5 against the Denver Nuggets, playing 3 minutes. On February 10 against the Oklahoma City Thunder, Brooks played 7 minutes and scored his first 4 career points.

=== Noblesville Boom (2026–present) ===
On September 14, 2026, Brooks signed an Exhibit 10 contract with the Indiana Pacers. However, he was waived by Indiana the following day.

== Career statistics ==
Legend
GP	Games played	GS	Games started	MPG	Minutes per game
FG%	Field goal percentage	3P%	3-point field goal percentage	FT%	Free throw percentage
RPG	Rebounds per game	APG	Assists per game	SPG	Steals per game
BPG	Blocks per game	PPG	Points per game	**Bold**	Career high

=== College ===
Year	Team	GP	GS	MPG	FG%	3P%	FT%	RPG	APG	SPG	BPG	PPG
2019–20	Kentucky	31	6	15.1	.472	.263	.630	3.2	.2	.4	.4	4.5
2020–21	Kentucky	16	3	23.6	.441	.214	**.795**	**6.8**	**1.6**	.6	.8	10.3
2021–22	Kentucky	**33**	**33**	24.5	**.491**	.233	.783	4.4	1.0	**.7**	.6	10.8
2022–23	Washington	30	30	**35.5**	.433	.286	.794	6.7	1.4	**.7**	**1.2**	17.7
2023–24	Washington	32	32	35.0	.487	**.380**	.794	**6.8**	1.4	**.7**	.8	**21.1**
Career		142	104	27.0	.466	.313	.784	5.4	1.1	.6	.8	13.1

=== NBA ===
==== Regular season ====
Year	Team	GP	GS	MPG	FG%	3P%	FT%	RPG	APG	SPG	BPG	PPG
2025–26	New Orleans	14	6	23.7	.486	.326	.733	4.1	.9	.7	.7	10.1

== Personal life ==
Brooks' father, Keion Sr., played college basketball for Wright State. Brooks has served on the National Association of Basketball Coaches Player Development Coalition, as well as the Southeastern Conference Leadership Council and Council on Racial Equity and Social Justice.
