= Kobe Johnson =

American basketball player (born 2003)

No. 0 – College Park Skyhawks
- Position: Shooting guard / point guard
- League: NBA G League

Personal information
- Born: January 15, 2003 (age 23) Milwaukee, Wisconsin, U.S.
- Listed height: 6 ft 6 in (1.98 m)
- Listed weight: 200 lb (91 kg)

Career information
- High school: Sun Prairie (Sun Prairie, Wisconsin); Nicolet (Glendale, Wisconsin)
- College: USC (2021–2024); UCLA (2024–2025)
- NBA draft: 2025: undrafted
- Playing career: 2025–present

Career history
- 2025–present: College Park Skyhawks

Career highlights
- Big Ten All-Defensive Team (2025); 2× Pac-12 All-Defensive Team (2023, 2024)
- Stats at NBA.com
- Stats at Basketball Reference

Kobe Johnson (born January 15, 2003) is an American professional basketball player for the College Park Skyhawks of the NBA G League. He played college basketball for the USC Trojans and the UCLA Bruins.

== Early life and high school ==
Johnson grew up in Sun Prairie, Wisconsin and initially attended Sun Prairie High School. He transferred to Nicolet High School after his freshman year. As a junior, Johnson averaged 19.5 points, 8.7 rebounds, 5.0 assists and 3.1 steals per game. He averaged 26.7 points, 10.4 rebounds, 4.1 assists, and 2.4 steals per game during his senior season. Johnson committed to play college basketball at USC over offers from Colorado State, California, Elon, and Kansas State.

== College career ==
Johnson played in 27 games during his freshman season with the USC Trojans, averaging 1.2 points and one rebound per game. He became a starter as a sophomore and averaged 9.2 points and 5.0 rebounds per game while being named to the Pac-12 Conference All-Defensive team. Johnson repeated as a Pac-12 All-Defensive Team selection as a junior while averaging 10.9 points, 4.6 rebounds, 3.3 assists, and 2.2 steals per game. After the season, he entered the NCAA transfer portal.

Johnson transferred to the UCLA Bruins, the Trojans' crosstown rival. He averaged 7.9 points, 5.9 rebounds, 2.9 assists, and 1.6 steals per game. Johnson was named to the Big Ten All-Defensive Team for the 2024–25 season.

== Professional career ==
After going undrafted in the 2025 NBA draft, Johnson signed an Exhibit 10 deal with the Atlanta Hawks. He was waived on September 26, 2025. Johnson joined the College Park Skyhawks and averaged 14.5 points, 6.6 rebounds, and 2.9 assists per game. He joined the Atlanta Hawks for 2026 NBA Summer League.

== Personal life ==
Johnson's older brother, Jalen Johnson, plays for the Atlanta Hawks.
