= Jermaine Couisnard =

American basketball player (born 1998)

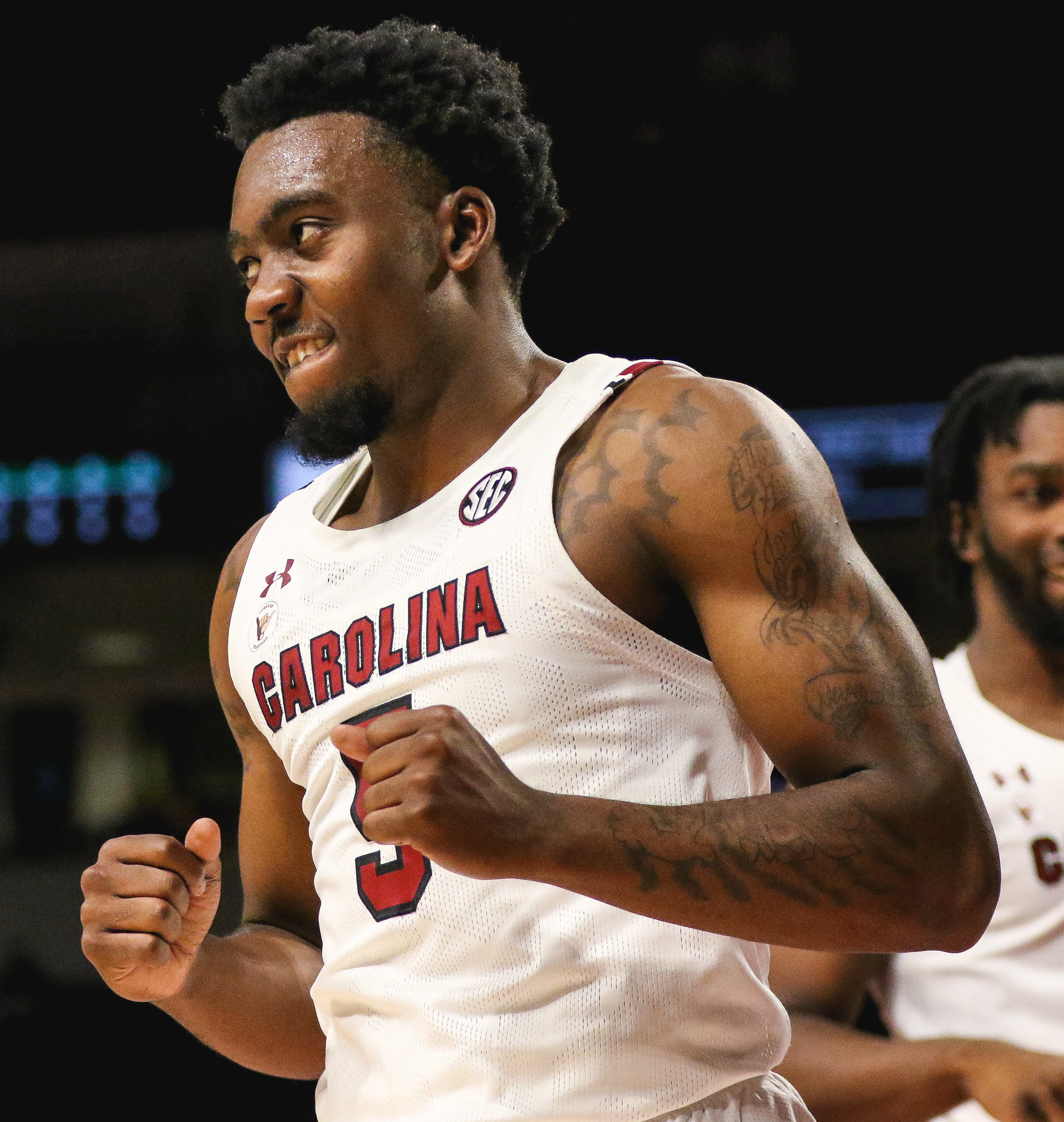
- Couisnard with South Carolina in 2021

Rio Grande Valley Vipers
- Position: Shooting guard
- League: NBA G League

Personal information
- Born: November 25, 1998 (age 27) East Chicago, Indiana, U.S.
- Listed height: 6 ft 4 in (1.93 m)
- Listed weight: 215 lb (98 kg)

Career information
- High school: Central (East Chicago, Indiana); Montverde Academy (Montverde, Florida)
- College: South Carolina (2019–2022); Oregon (2022–2024)
- NBA draft: 2024: undrafted
- Playing career: 2024–present

Career history
- 2024: Lavrio
- 2025–2026: Rip City Remix
- 2026: Memphis Hustle
- 2026: Grand Rapids Gold
- 2026–present: Rio Grande Valley Vipers

Career highlights
- Second-team All-Pac-12 (2024); SEC All-Freshman Team (2020)

Jermaine Armontae Couisnard (born November 25, 1998) is an American professional basketball player for the Rio Grande Valley Vipers of the NBA G League. He played college basketball for the South Carolina Gamecocks and the Oregon Ducks.

== Early life ==
Couisnard grew up in East Chicago, Indiana and began playing basketball at a young age, receiving the nickname "Little J." He joined the ECG Ballhogs travel basketball team in third grade. Couisnard attended Central High School in East Chicago, where he was coached by Pete Trgovich. East Chicago native and NBA player E'Twaun Moore served as a mentor to Couisnard. As a junior, Couisnard averaged 17.2 points, six rebounds, and 2.6 assists per game and was selected to the Indiana Junior All Stars North squad. He scored 45 points against Benjamin Bosse High School and 36 points against Indianapolis North Central High School. Couisnard averaged 29.2 points, 4.3 rebounds and 2.1 assists per game as a senior, but missed the Indiana-Kentucky All-Star Games due to a knee injury. He decided to take a postgraduate year at Montverde Academy to improve his academics and receive more recruiting attention. Couisnard averaged 23 points, six rebounds, and seven assists for Montverde, playing against RJ Barrett in practice. On January 27, 2018, he committed to playing college basketball for South Carolina, choosing the Gamecocks over Illinois and Louisville.

== College career ==
Couisnard redshirted his freshman year due to an academic issue. On February 5, 2020, he scored a career-high 28 points in a 84–70 loss to Ole Miss. As a redshirt freshman, Couisnard averaged 12.1 points, 2.8 rebounds and 3.2 assists per game, earning SEC All-Freshman Team honors. He averaged 10.1 points and 3.2 assists per game as a sophomore. Following the season, Couisnard declared for the 2021 NBA draft but did not hire an agent and ultimately returned to South Carolina. He missed a game against Coastal Carolina on December 1, 2021, due to a groin injury. Couisnard also missed several games in December due to an ankle injury. He averaged 12.0 points, 2.5 rebounds and 3.2 assists per game as a junior. Couisnard transferred to Oregon after the season.

He averaged 12.8 points and 3.1 rebounds per game as a redshirt junior, playing 19 games. Couisnard announced he was returning for his final season. On March 2, 2024, Couisnard got a career high 39 points vs Arizona in a 103–83 loss. On March 19, 2024, Cousinard broke that career high with 40 points in a March Madness win over his former team South Carolina with a final score of 87–73. He averaged 16.6 points, 4.6 rebounds and 3.3 assists per game in his redshirt senior season.

== Professional career ==
After going unselected in the 2024 NBA draft, Couisnard joined the New Orleans Pelicans for the 2024 NBA Summer League.

On August 2, 2024, he signed with Lavrio of the Greek Basket League (GBL). However, the deal was voided early due to Couisnard having to remain in the United States for family reasons.

Couisnard was selected in the second round of the 2025 NBA G League draft. In the 2025–26 season, he played for the Memphis Hustle, Grand Rapids Gold and Rip City Remix. On March 28, 2026, Couisnard signed with the Rio Grande Valley Vipers.

== Career statistics ==
Legend
| GP | Games played | GS | Games started | MPG | Minutes per game |
| FG% | Field goal percentage | 3P% | 3-point field goal percentage | FT% | Free throw percentage |
| RPG | Rebounds per game | APG | Assists per game | SPG | Steals per game |
| BPG | Blocks per game | PPG | Points per game | **Bold** | Career high |

=== College ===
| Year | Team | GP | GS | MPG | FG% | 3P% | FT% | RPG | APG | SPG | BPG | PPG |
|---|---|---|---|---|---|---|---|---|---|---|---|---|
| 2018–19 | South Carolina | Redshirt | | | | | | | | | | |
| 2019–20 | South Carolina | **30** | **16** | 26.0 | **.392** | **.290** | **.669** | 2.8 | **3.2** | .8 | **.1** | **12.1** |
| 2020–21 | South Carolina | 17 | 14 | **27.0** | .302 | .289 | .580 | **3.0** | **3.2** | **1.3** | **.1** | 10.1 |
| Career | | 47 | 30 | 26.4 | .358 | .290 | .643 | 2.9 | 3.2 | 1.0 | .1 | 11.4 |

== Personal life ==
Couisnard is the son of Jermaine Couisnard and Raven Merkerson and has two younger sisters, Kalani and Maya. His father works as a maintenance repair technician. In October 2020, Couisnard's best friend DeAndre Bass was shot and killed. In August 2021, his mother was diagnosed with colorectal cancer, and Couisnard contemplated leaving school but was persuaded to return by her.
