= 2024–25 Colorado Buffaloes men's basketball team =

American college basketball season

2024–25 Colorado Buffaloes men's basketball

College Basketball Crown, First Round
- Conference: Big 12 Conference
- Record: 14–21 (3–17 Big 12)
- Head coach: Tad Boyle (15th season)
- Assistant coaches: Mike Rhon; Bill Grier; Danny Manning
- Home arena: CU Events Center

2024–25 Big 12 men's basketball standings
| | Conf. | | | | Overall |
| Team | W | | L | PCT | W | | L | PCT |
|---|---|---|---|---|---|---|---|---|
| No. 2 Houston † | 19 | – | 1 | .950 | 35 | – | 5 | .875 |
| No. 8 Texas Tech | 15 | – | 5 | .750 | 28 | – | 9 | .757 |
| No. 15 Arizona | 14 | – | 6 | .700 | 24 | – | 13 | .649 |
| No. 13 BYU | 14 | – | 6 | .700 | 26 | – | 10 | .722 |
| No. 17 Iowa State | 13 | – | 7 | .650 | 25 | – | 10 | .714 |
| Kansas | 11 | – | 9 | .550 | 21 | – | 13 | .618 |
| Baylor | 10 | – | 10 | .500 | 20 | – | 15 | .571 |
| West Virginia | 10 | – | 10 | .500 | 19 | – | 13 | .594 |
| TCU | 9 | – | 11 | .450 | 16 | – | 16 | .500 |
| Kansas State | 9 | – | 11 | .450 | 16 | – | 17 | .485 |
| Utah | 8 | – | 12 | .400 | 16 | – | 17 | .485 |
| Oklahoma State | 7 | – | 13 | .350 | 17 | – | 18 | .486 |
| Cincinnati | 7 | – | 13 | .350 | 19 | – | 16 | .543 |
| UCF | 7 | – | 13 | .350 | 20 | – | 17 | .541 |
| Arizona State | 4 | – | 16 | .200 | 13 | – | 20 | .394 |
| Colorado | 3 | – | 17 | .150 | 14 | – | 21 | .400 |
† 2025 Big 12 tournament winner Rankings from AP poll

The 2024–25 Colorado Buffaloes men's basketball team represented the University of Colorado Boulder in the 2024–25 NCAA Division I men's basketball season. They were led by Tad Boyle in his 15th season as head coach. The Buffaloes played their home games at CU Events Center in Boulder, Colorado as members of the Big 12 Conference.

== Previous season ==
The Buffaloes finished the 2023–24 season 26–11, 13–7 in Pac-12 play to finish in third place. They defeated Utah and Washington State to advance to the championship game of the Pac-12 tournament. There they lost to Oregon. They received an at-large bid to the NCAA tournament as a No. 10 seed in the South region. They defeated Boise State in the First Four and Florida in the First Round to advance to the round of 32. There they lost to Marquette.

In July 2023, the school announced it would leave the Pac-12 Conference to rejoin the Big 12 in August 2024. The Buffaloes had previously been members of the Big 12 through 2011.

== Offseason ==
=== Departures ===
| Name | Num | Pos. | Height | Weight | Year | Hometown | Reason |
|---|---|---|---|---|---|---|---|
| Luke O'Brien | 0 | G | 6'8" | 222 | Senior | Littleton, CO | Graduate transferred to Georgia Tech |
| Tristan da Silva | 23 | F | 6'9" | 220 | Senior | Munich, Germany | Graduated; declared for the 2024 NBA draft; selected 18th overall by the Orlando Magic |
| J'Vonne Hadley | 1 | F | 6'6" | 205 | Senior | Saint Paul, MN | Graduate transferred to Louisville |
| Eddie Lampkin Jr. | 44 | F | 6'11" | 265 | Senior | Houston, TX | Graduate transferred to Syracuse |
| K. J. Simpson | 2 | G | 6'0" | 189 | Junior | West Hills, CA | Declared for the 2024 NBA draft; selected 42nd overall by the Charlotte Hornets |
| Cody Williams | 10 | F | 6'8" | 190 | Freshman | Gilbert, AZ | Declared for the 2024 NBA draft; selected 10th overall by the Utah Jazz |
| Joe Hurlburt | 24 | F | 6'11" | 235 | Freshman | Enderlin, ND | Transferred to Davidson |

=== Incoming transfers ===
| Name | Num | Pos. | Height | Weight | Year | Hometown | Previous school |
|---|---|---|---|---|---|---|---|
| Trevor Baskin | 6 | F | 6'9" | 200 | Jr | Arvada, CO | Colorado Mesa |
| Andrej Jakimovski | 23 | F | 6'8" | 220 | Sr | Skopje, North Macedonia | Washington State |
| Elijah Malone | 50 | C | 6'10" | 265 | Sr | Lagrange, IN | Grace College |

=== 2024 recruiting class ===
College recruiting
| Name | Hometown | School | Height | Weight | Commit date |
|---|---|---|---|---|---|
| Andrew Crawford; G | Highlands Ranch, CO | ThunderRidge High School | 6 ft 6 in (1.98 m) | 185 lb (84 kg) | Oct 14, 2023 |
| Andrew Crawford; G | Recruit ratings: Rivals: 247Sports: ESPN: | | | | |
| Sebastian Rancik; F | San Juan Capistrano, CA | JSerra Catholic High School | 6 ft 9 in (2.06 m) | 195 lb (88 kg) | Oct 21, 2023 |
| Sebastian Rancik; F | Recruit ratings: Rivals: 247Sports: ESPN: | | | | |
| Felix Kossaras; SG | Fort Erie, ON | Fort Erie International Academy | 6 ft 5 in (1.96 m) | 180 lb (82 kg) | Oct 31, 2023 |
| Felix Kossaras; SG | Recruit ratings: Rivals: 247Sports: ESPN: | | | | |
Overall recruit ranking:
Note: In many cases, Scout, Rivals, 247Sports, On3, and ESPN may conflict in their listings of height and weight.; In these cases, the average was taken. ESPN grades are on a 100-point scale.; Sources: "2024 Colorado Commits". Rivals.; "2024 Team Ranking". Rivals.

== Preseason ==
Big 12 Preseason Poll

| | Big 12 Coaches | Points |
| 1. | Kansas | 215 (9) |
| 2. | Houston | 211 (5) |
| 3. | Iowa State | 194 (1) |
| 4. | Baylor | 185 |
| 5. | Arizona | 179 (1) |
| 6. | Cincinnati | 140 |
| 7. | Texas Tech | 135 |
| 8. | Kansas State | 133 |
| 9. | BYU | 116 |
| 10. | TCU | 90 |
| 11. | UCF | 83 |
| 12. | Arizona State | 64 |
| 13. | West Virginia | 62 |
| 14. | Oklahoma State | 46 |
| 15. | Colorado | 37 |
| 16. | Utah | 30 |
Reference: (#) first-place votes

Pre-Season All-Big 12 Team

First Team

| Player | School |
|---|---|
| Caleb Love | Arizona |
| LJ Cryer | Houston |
| J’Wan Roberts | Houston |
| Tamin Lipsey | Iowa State |
| Hunter Dickinson† | Kansas |
† denotes unanimous selection Reference:

Second Team

| Player | School |
|---|---|
| Norchad Omier | Baylor |
| Jeremy Roach | Baylor |
| Keshon Gilbert | Iowa State |
| Dajuan Harris Jr | Kansas |
| Coleman Hawkins | Kansas State |
† denotes unanimous selection Reference:

- Player of the Year: Hunter Dickinson, Kansas
- Co-Newcomer of the Year: Jeremy Roach, Baylor & Coleman Hawkins, Kansas State
- Freshman of the Year: V. J. Edgecombe, Baylor

== Roster ==
2024–25 Colorado Buffaloes men's basketball team
Players
Coaches

| Pos. | # | Name | Height | Weight | Year | Previous school | Hometown |
|---|---|---|---|---|---|---|---|
| G | 3 | Julian Hammond III | 6 ft 2 in (1.88 m) | 193 lb (88 kg) | Sr | Cherry Creek HS | Denver, CO |
| G | 5 | RJ Smith | 6 ft 3 in (1.91 m) | 186 lb (84 kg) | RS So | Damien HS | Chino, CA |
| F | 6 | Trevor Baskin | 6 ft 9 in (2.06 m) | 200 lb (91 kg) | GS | Pomona HS; Colorado Mesa | Arvada, CO |
| F | 7 | Sebastian Rancik | 6 ft 9 in (2.06 m) | 210 lb (95 kg) | Fr | JSerra Catholic HS | Bratislava, Slovakia |
| F | 8 | Bangot Dak | 6 ft 11 in (2.11 m) | 180 lb (82 kg) | So | Lincoln Southeast HS | Lincoln, NE |
| G | 11 | Javon Ruffin | 6 ft 5 in (1.96 m) | 201 lb (91 kg) | RS Jr | PHH Prep | New Orleans, LA |
| G | 13 | Courtney Anderson Jr. | 6 ft 5 in (1.96 m) | 182 lb (83 kg) | RS Fr | Dublin HS | Vallejo, CA |
| G | 15 | Felix Kossaras | 6 ft 5 in (1.96 m) | 180 lb (82 kg) | Fr | Fort Erie International Academy | Montreal, Quebec |
| F | 23 | Andrej Jakimovski | 6 ft 8 in (2.03 m) | 220 lb (100 kg) | GS | Reale Mutua Torino; Washington State | Skopje, Macedonia |
| F/C | 30 | Greg Gerhardt (W) | 6 ft 10 in (2.08 m) | 218 lb (99 kg) | RS So | Monarch HS; Sunrise Christian | Superior, CO |
| G/F | 31 | Harrison Carrington (W) | 6 ft 7 in (2.01 m) | 209 lb (95 kg) | RS So | Northfield Mount Hermon | Menlo Park, CA |
| G | 34 | Jack Pease (W) | 6 ft 0 in (1.83 m) | 170 lb (77 kg) | Jr | Highland Park HS | Dallas, TX |
| F | 35 | Assane Diop | 6 ft 8 in (2.03 m) | 210 lb (95 kg) | So | Accelerated Schools of Denver | Dakar, Senegal |
| G | 40 | Grady Whitt (W) | 6 ft 3 in (1.91 m) | 170 lb (77 kg) | RS Fr | Leesville Road HS | Raleigh, NC |
| F | 41 | Nick Randall (W) | 6 ft 8 in (2.03 m) | 190 lb (86 kg) | RS Fr | Fossil Ridge HS | Fort Collins, CO |
| G | 42 | Andrew Crawford | 6 ft 6 in (1.98 m) | 175 lb (79 kg) | Fr | ThunderRidge HS | Littleton, CO |
| C | 50 | Elijah Malone | 6 ft 10 in (2.08 m) | 280 lb (127 kg) | GS | Prairie Heights HS; Grace College | LaGrange, IN |

Head coach

- Tad Boyle (Kansas)

Assistant coach(es)

- Mike Rohn (McPherson)
- Bill Grier (Oregon)
- Danny Manning (Kansas)

Legend

- (C) Team captain
- (S) Suspended
- (I) Ineligible
- (W) Walk-on
- Injured
- Current redshirt

Roster

== Schedule and results ==
| Date time, TV | Rank^{#} | Opponent^{#} | Result | Record | High points | High rebounds | High assists | Site (attendance) city, state |
Exhibition
| October 19, 2024*; 3:00 p.m., ESPN+ | | Pomona–Pitzer | W 95–62 | | 16 – Dak | 6 – Baskin | 5 – Hammond III | CU Events Center (950); Boulder, CO |
Non-conference regular season
| November 4, 2024*; 7:00 p.m., ESPN+ | | Eastern Washington | W 76–56 | 1–0 | 13 – Rancik | 7 – Tied | 4 – Hammond III | CU Events Center (5,679); Boulder, CO |
| November 8, 2024*; 7:00 p.m., ESPN+ | | Northern Colorado | W 90–88 ^{2OT} | 2–0 | 27 – Malone | 10 – Diop | 2 – Tied | CU Events Center (6,152); Boulder, CO |
| November 13, 2024*; 7:00 p.m., ESPN+ | | Cal State Fullerton | W 83–53 | 3–0 | 17 – Jakimovski | 8 – Diop | 5 – Ruffin | CU Events Center (5,358); Boulder, CO |
| November 17, 2024*; 12:00 p.m., ESPN+ | | Harvard | W 88–66 | 4–0 | 20 – Jakimovski | 7 – Malone | 4 – Ruffin | CU Events Center (6,288); Boulder, CO |
| November 25, 2024*; 3:00 p.m., ESPN2 | | vs. Michigan State; Maui Invitational quarterfinals | L 56–72 | 4–1 | 15 – Hammond | 5 – Malone | 5 – Hammond | Lahaina Civic Center (2,400); Lahaina, HI |
| November 26, 2024*; 1:30 p.m., ESPN2 | | vs. No. 2 UConn; Maui Invitational consolation 2nd round | W 73–72 | 5–1 | 16 – Hammond III | 10 – Jakimovski | 3 – Hammond III | Lahaina Civic Center (2,400); Lahaina, HI |
| November 27, 2024*; 12:30 p.m., ESPN2 | | vs. No. 5 Iowa State; Maui Invitational 5th place game | L 71–99 | 5–2 | 20 – Hammond III | 8 – Baskin | 4 – Ruffin | Lahaina Civic Center (2,400); Lahaina, HI |
| December 2, 2024*; 7:00 p.m., ESPN+ | | Pacific | W 75–66 | 6–2 | 17 – Jakimovski | 10 – Baskin | 7 – Baskin | CU Events Center (5,235); Boulder, CO |
| December 7, 2024*; 6:00 p.m., ESPN+ | | Colorado State; Rocky Mountain Showdown | W 72–55 | 7–2 | 16 – Dak | 11 – Baskin | 3 – Tied | CU Events Center (9,143); Boulder, CO |
| December 13, 2024*; 7:00 p.m., ESPN+ | | South Dakota State | W 81–70 | 8–2 | 23 – Hammond III | 9 – Malone | 6 – Hammond III | CU Events Center (5,942); Boulder, CO |
| December 21, 2024*; 1:00 p.m., ESPN+ | | Bellarmine | W 79–55 | 9–2 | 15 – Diop | 5 – Smith | 5 – Hammond III | CU Events Center (7,684); Boulder, CO |
Big 12 regular season
| December 30, 2024; 7:00 p.m., CBSSN | | No. 3 Iowa State | L 69–79 | 9–3 (0–1) | 21 – Hammond | 8 – Dak | 5 – Dak | CU Events Center (9,157); Boulder, CO |
| January 4, 2025; 4:00 p.m., ESPN+ | | at Arizona State | L 61–81 | 9–4 (0–2) | 23 – Baskin | 10 – Baskin | 5 – Smith | Desert Financial Arena (7,998); Tempe, AZ |
| January 8, 2025; 5:00 p.m., ESPN+ | | at UCF | L 74–75 | 9–5 (0–3) | 26 – Hammond III | 8 – Smith | 5 – Diop | Addition Financial Arena (8,204); Orlando, FL |
| January 12, 2025; 1:00 p.m., ESPN+ | | No. 21 West Virginia | L 70–78 | 9–6 (0–4) | 23 – Hammond | 7 – Ruffin | 4 – Ruffin | CU Events Center (6,975); Boulder, CO |
| January 15, 2025; 7:00 p.m., ESPN+ | | Cincinnati | L 62–68 | 9–7 (0–5) | 19 – Dak | 8 – Tied | 2 – Tied | CU Events Center (6,576); Boulder, CO |
| January 18, 2025; 1:00 p.m., ESPN+ | | at Oklahoma State | L 73–83 | 9–8 (0–6) | 15 – Dak | 5 – Dak | 4 – Baskin | Gallagher-Iba Arena (7,247); Stillwater, OK |
| January 21, 2025; 9:00 p.m., ESPNU | | BYU | L 67–83 | 9–9 (0–7) | 17 – Hammond | 6 – Baskin | 2 – Tied | CU Events Center (6,166); Boulder, CO |
| January 25, 2025; 1:00 p.m., ESPN+ | | at Arizona | L 63–76 | 9–10 (0–8) | 19 – Hammond | 6 – Malone | 4 – Hammond | McKale Center (14,688); Tucson, AZ |
| January 28, 2025; 7:00 p.m., ESPN+ | | Arizona State | L 68–70 | 9–11 (0–9) | 19 – Baskin | 6 – Dak | 4 – Hammond | CU Events Center (6,189); Boulder, CO |
| February 2, 2025; 2:00 p.m., ESPN+ | | at TCU | L 57–68 | 9–12 (0–10) | 12 – Jakimovski | 12 – Dak | 7 – Hammond | Schollmaier Arena (5,029); Fort Worth, TX |
| February 5, 2025; 7:00 p.m., ESPN+ | | at Utah; Rumble in the Rockies | L 59–72 | 9–13 (0–11) | 13 – Ruffin | 7 – Baskin | 3 – Ruffin | Jon M. Huntsman Center (7,581); Salt Lake City, UT |
| February 8, 2025; 2:00 p.m., ESPN+ | | No. 5 Houston | L 59–69 | 9–14 (0–12) | 22 – Hammond | 5 – Jakimovski | 3 – Jakimovski | CU Events Center (7,485); Boulder, CO |
| February 11, 2025; 7:00 p.m., ESPN2 | | at No. 17 Kansas | L 59–71 | 9–15 (0–13) | 19 – Rancik | 9 – Rancik | 3 – Hammond | Allen Fieldhouse (15,300); Lawrence, KS |
| February 15, 2025; 1:00 p.m., ESPN+ | | UCF | W 76–63 | 10–15 (1–13) | 15 – Jakimovski | 10 – Diop | 3 – Dak | CU Events Center (7,212); Boulder, CO |
| February 18, 2025; 6:00 p.m., ESPN+ | | at No. 8 Iowa State | L 65–79 | 10–16 (1–14) | 20 – Dak | 5 – Kossaras | 2 – Tied | Hilton Coliseum (14,267); Ames, IA |
| February 22, 2025; 2:00 p.m., ESPN+ | | Baylor | W 76–74 | 11–16 (2–14) | 17 – Jakimovski | 7 – Jakimovski | 5 – Jakimovski | CU Events Center (7,431); Boulder, CO |
| February 24, 2025; 9:00 p.m., ESPN | | Kansas | L 64–71 | 11–17 (2–15) | 16 – Dak | 6 – Tied | 3 – Hammond | CU Events Center (11,042); Boulder, CO |
| March 2, 2025; 2:00 p.m., ESPN+ | | at Kansas State | L 56–65 | 11–18 (2–16) | 11 – Smith | 6 – Malone | 5 – Ruffin | Bramlage Coliseum (8,832); Manhattan, KS |
| March 5, 2025; 6:00 p.m., ESPN+ | | at No. 9 Texas Tech | L 75–91 | 11–19 (2–17) | 12 – Tied | 7 – Jakimovski | 2 – Tied | United Supermarkets Arena (15,098); Lubbock, TX |
| March 8, 2025; 2:00 p.m., ESPN+ | | TCU | W 76–56 | 12–19 (3–17) | 19 – Hammond | 16 – Baskin | 7 – Hammond | CU Events Center (7,057); Boulder, CO |
Big 12 tournament
| March 11, 2025; 1:00 p.m., ESPN+ | (16) | vs. (9) TCU; First round | W 69–67 | 13–19 | 18 – Jakimovski | 7 – Tied | 4 – Ruffin | T-Mobile Center (6,406); Kansas City, MO |
| March 12, 2025; 1:00 p.m, ESPN+ | (16) | vs. (8) West Virginia; Second round | W 67–60 | 14–19 | 14 – Malone | 6 – Jakimovski | 5 – Hammond III | T-Mobile Center (12,922); Kansas City, MO |
| March 13, 2025; 1:00 p.m, ESPN2 | (16) | vs. (1) No. 2 Houston; Quarterfinals | L 68–77 | 14–20 | 25 – Jakimovski | 8 – Jakimovski | 4 – Smith | T-Mobile Center (15,366); Kansas City, MO |
College Basketball Crown
| April 1, 2025*; 6:30 p.m., FS1 | | vs. Villanova; First round | L 64–85 | 14–21 | 17 – Malone | 10 – Malone | 4 – Tied | MGM Grand Garden Arena; Paradise, NV |
*Non-conference game. ^{#}Rankings from AP poll. (#) Tournament seedings in parentheses. All times are in Mountain Time.
