= 2023–24 Colorado Buffaloes men's basketball team =

American college basketball season

2023–24 Colorado Buffaloes men's basketball

NCAA tournament, Second Round
- Conference: Pac-12 Conference
- Record: 26–11 (13–7 Pac-12)
- Head coach: Tad Boyle (14th season)
- Assistant coaches: Mike Rhon; Bill Grier; Rick Ray; Bill Cartun; Zach Ruebesam
- Home arena: CU Events Center

2023–24 Pac-12 Conference men's basketball standings
	Conf.				Overall
Team	W		L	PCT	W		L	PCT
No. 11 Arizona	15	–	5	.750	27	–	9	.750
No. 23 Washington State	14	–	6	.700	25	–	10	.714
Colorado	13	–	7	.650	26	–	11	.703
Oregon †	12	–	8	.600	24	–	12	.667
UCLA	10	–	10	.500	16	–	17	.485
Utah	9	–	11	.450	22	–	15	.595
California	9	–	11	.450	13	–	19	.406
Washington	9	–	11	.450	17	–	15	.531
USC	8	–	12	.400	15	–	18	.455
Stanford	8	–	12	.400	14	–	18	.438
Arizona State	8	–	12	.400	14	–	18	.438
Oregon State	5	–	15	.250	13	–	19	.406
† 2024 Pac-12 tournament winner Rankings from AP Poll

The 2023–24 Colorado Buffaloes men's basketball team represented the University of Colorado Boulder in the 2023–24 NCAA Division I men's basketball season. They were led by head coach Tad Boyle in his fourteenth season at Colorado. The Buffaloes played their home games at CU Events Center in Boulder, Colorado in their last season as members of the Pac-12 Conference before they rejoined the Big 12 Conference in the 2024–25 season.

Following their victory over Oregon State on March 9, 2024, the Buffaloes finished the regular season with 22 wins, the most regular-season wins in program history. They defeated Utah in the quarterfinals and Washington State in the semifinals of the Pac-12 tournament before falling to Oregon in the Pac-12 championship game. Colorado returned to the NCAA tournament for the first time since 2021 where they defeated Boise State, 60–53, in the First Four and Florida, 102–100, in the first round before losing to Marquette, 81–77, in the second round. The Buffaloes' defeat of Boise State and Florida gave Colorado their most victories in program history.

== Previous season ==
The Buffaloes finished the season 18–17, 8–12 in Pac-12 play. They defeated Washington in the first round of the Pac-12 tournament before losing in the quarterfinals to UCLA. They received an at-large bid to the National Invitation Tournament where they defeated Seton Hall in the first round before losing to Utah Valley in the second round.

== Off-season ==
=== Departures ===
Name	Num	Pos.	Height	Weight	Year	Hometown	Reason for departure
Jalen Gabbidon	3	G	6' 5"	195	Graduate student	Harrisburg, PA	Graduated
Quincy Allen	5	G/F	6' 8"	190	Sophomore	Silver Spring, MD	Transferred to James Madison
Ethan Wright	14	G	6' 3"	190	Graduate student	Newton Centre, MA	Graduated
Amondo Miller Jr.	15	G/F	6' 6"	181	RS Freshman	Littleton, CO	Transferred to Fort Lewis College
Nique Clifford	32	G	6' 6"	191	Junior	Colorado Springs, CO	Transferred to Colorado State
Lawson Lovering	34	C	7' 1"	225	Sophomore	Cheyenne, WY	Transferred to Utah
Cody Mains	41	F	6' 8"	215	Senior	Fairfax, VA	Graduated
Ethan Johnson	44	G	6' 0"	150	Freshman	Holyoke, CO	Left the program

=== Incoming transfers ===
Name	Num	Pos.	Height	Weight	Year	Hometown	Previous school
Eddie Lampkin Jr.	44	C	6' 11"	265	Senior	Houston, TX	TCU

=== 2023 Recruiting class ===
College recruiting
Name	Hometown	School	Height	Weight	Commit date
Cody Williams; F	Gilbert, AZ	Perry High School	6 ft 8 in (2.03 m)	180 lb (82 kg)	Nov 9, 2022
Cody Williams; F	Recruit ratings: Rivals: 247Sports: ESPN:				
Assane Diop; F	Westminster, CO	Accelerated Schools	6 ft 10 in (2.08 m)	210 lb (95 kg)	Nov 15, 2022
Assane Diop; F	Recruit ratings: Rivals: 247Sports: ESPN:				
Courtney Anderson Jr. G	Richmond, CA	Dublin High School	6 ft 3 in (1.91 m)	165 lb (75 kg)	Sep 23, 2022
Courtney Anderson Jr. G	Recruit ratings: Rivals: 247Sports: ESPN:				
Bangot Dak; F	Lincoln, NE	Lincoln Southeast	6 ft 10 in (2.08 m)	180 lb (82 kg)	Jun 7, 2023
Bangot Dak; F	Recruit ratings: No ratings found				
Overall recruit ranking:
Note: In many cases, Scout, Rivals, 247Sports, On3, and ESPN may conflict in their listings of height and weight.; In these cases, the average was taken. ESPN grades are on a 100-point scale.; Sources: "2023 Colorado Commits". Rivals.; "2023 Team Ranking". Rivals.

== Roster ==
2023–24 Colorado Buffaloes men's basketball team
Players
Coaches

Pos.	#	Name	Height	Weight	Year	Previous school	Hometown
G	0	Luke O'Brien	6 ft 8 in (2.03 m)	222 lb (101 kg)	Sr	Columbine HS	Littleton, CO
G	1	J'Vonne Hadley	6 ft 6 in (1.98 m)	205 lb (93 kg)	Sr	Cretin-Derham Hall HS; Indian Hills CC	St. Paul, MN
G	2	KJ Simpson	6 ft 2 in (1.88 m)	189 lb (86 kg)	Jr	Chaminade College Prep	West Hills, CA
G	3	Julian III Hammond	6 ft 2 in (1.88 m)	193 lb (88 kg)	Jr	Cherry Creek HS	Denver, CO
G	5	RJ Smith	6 ft 3 in (1.91 m)	186 lb (84 kg)	RS Fr	Damien HS	Chino, CA
F	10	Cody Williams	6 ft 8 in (2.03 m)	190 lb (86 kg)	Fr	Perry HS	Gilbert, AZ
G	11	Javon Ruffin	6 ft 5 in (1.96 m)	201 lb (91 kg)	RS So	PHH Prep	New Orleans, LA
F	12	Bangot Dak	6 ft 11 in (2.11 m)	180 lb (82 kg)	Fr	Lincoln Southeast HS	Lincoln, NE
G	13	Courtney Jr. Anderson	6 ft 5 in (1.96 m)	182 lb (83 kg)	Fr	Dublin HS	Vallejo, CA
G	15	Tristan Jackson (W)	6 ft 7 in (2.01 m)	191 lb (87 kg)	Fr	Salida HS	Salida, CO
F	23	Tristan da Silva	6 ft 9 in (2.06 m)	220 lb (100 kg)	Sr	Ludwigsgymnasium Munich	Munich, Germany
F	24	Joe Hurlburt	6 ft 11 in (2.11 m)	235 lb (107 kg)	RS Fr	Enderlin HS	Enderlin, ND
F/C	30	Greg Gerhardt (W)	6 ft 10 in (2.08 m)	218 lb (99 kg)	RS Fr	Monarch HS; Sunrise Christian	Superior, CO
G/F	31	Harrison Carrington (W)	6 ft 7 in (2.01 m)	209 lb (95 kg)	RS Fr	Northfield Mount Hermon	Menlo Park, CA
G	34	Jack Pease (W)	6 ft 0 in (1.83 m)	170 lb (77 kg)	So	Highland Park HS	Dallas, TX
F	35	Assane Diop	6 ft 8 in (2.03 m)	210 lb (95 kg)	Fr	Accelerated Schools of Denver	Dakar, Senegal
G	40	Grady Whitt (W)	6 ft 3 in (1.91 m)	170 lb (77 kg)	Fr	Leesville Road HS	Raleigh, NC
C	44	Eddie Jr. Lampkin	6 ft 11 in (2.11 m)	265 lb (120 kg)	Sr	Morton Ranch HS; TCU	Houston, TX

Head coach

- Tad Boyle (Kansas)

Assistant coach(es)

- Mike Rohn (McPherson)
- Bill Grier (Oregon)
- Rick Ray (Grand View College)
- Bill Cartun (Bates College)
- Zach Ruebesam (Colorado)

Legend

- (C) Team captain
- (S) Suspended
- (I) Ineligible
- (W) Walk-on
- Injured
- Current redshirt

Roster
Last update: January 8, 2025

== Schedule and results ==
Date time, TV	Rank^{#}	Opponent^{#}	Result	Record	High points	High rebounds	High assists	Site (attendance) city, state
Exhibition
October 28, 2023*; 7:00 p.m.		MSU Denver	W 69–45	0–0	11 – da Silva	7 – O'Brien	4 – Hadley	CU Events Center (902); Boulder, CO
Non-conference regular season
November 6, 2023*; 5:30 p.m., P12N		Towson	W 75–57	1–0	22 – Simpson	9 – Hadley	4 – da Silva	CU Events Center (6,078); Boulder, CO
November 10, 2023*; 6:00 p.m., P12N		Grambling State; Pac-12/SWAC Legacy Series	W 95–63	2–0	21 – da Silva	8 – Hadley	8 – Simpson	CU Events Center (6,541); Boulder, CO
November 14, 2023*; 6:00 p.m., P12N	No. 25	Milwaukee; Sunshine Slam campus-site game	W 106–79	3–0	23 – Simpson	12 – Lampkin Jr.	6 – Simpson	CU Events Center (6,181); Boulder, CO
November 20, 2023*; 6:00 p.m., CBSSN	No. 18	vs. Richmond; Sunshine Slam Beach semifinals	W 64–59	4–0	23 – Simpson	8 – da Silva	3 – Hadley	Ocean Center (2,153); Daytona Beach, FL
November 21, 2023*; 2:00 p.m, CBSSN	No. 18	vs. Florida State; Sunshine Slam Beach championship	L 71–77 ^{OT}	4–1	17 – Williams	11 – Lampkin Jr.	4 – Lampkin Jr.	Ocean Center (1,502); Daytona Beach, FL
November 26, 2023*; 12:00 p.m., P12N	No. 18	Iona	W 85–68	5–1	21 – da Silva	7 – O'Brien	5 – Simpson	CU Events Center (6,346); Boulder, CO
November 29, 2023*; 7:00 p.m., CBSSN		at No. 20 Colorado State; Rocky Mountain Showdown	L 83–88	5–2	30 – Simpson	8 – da Silva	4 – Simpson	Moby Arena (8,083); Fort Collins, CO
December 3, 2023*; 3:00 p.m., P12N		Pepperdine	W 91–66	6–2	22 – da Silva	10 – Lampkin Jr.	4 – O'Brien	CU Events Center (7,231); Boulder, CO
December 10, 2023*; 12:00 p.m., ESPN2		vs. No. 15 Miami (FL); NABC Brooklyn Showcase	W 90–63	7–2	22 – da Silva	10 – da Silva	9 – da Silva	Barclays Center (6,072); Brooklyn, NY
December 15, 2023*; 6:00 p.m., P12N		Northern Colorado	W 90–68	8–2	21 – Simpson	10 – Lampkin Jr.	6 – Hadley	CU Events Center (7,177); Boulder, CO
December 21, 2023*; 5:00 p.m., P12N		Utah Tech	W 98–71	9–2	23 – Simpson	9 – Lampkin Jr.	6 – Simpson	CU Events Center (6,426); Boulder, CO
Pac-12 regular season
December 28, 2023; 7:00 p.m., ESPN2		Washington	W 73–69	10–2 (1–0)	21 – Simpson	12 – Lampkin Jr.	7 – Simpson	CU Events Center (7,799); Boulder, CO
December 31, 2023; 12:00 p.m., P12N		Washington State	W 74–67	11–2 (2–0)	34 – Simpson	6 – Hammond III	3 – Hadley	CU Events Center (6,952); Boulder, CO
January 4, 2024; 7:30 p.m., ESPN		at No. 10 Arizona	L 50–97	11–3 (2–1)	11 – Ruffin	7 – Simpson	3 – tied	McKale Center (14,286); Tucson, AZ
January 6, 2024; 6:00 p.m., ESPNU		at Arizona State	L 73–76	11–4 (2–2)	23 – Simpson	6 – Lampkin Jr.	4 – Simpson	Desert Financial Arena (8,128); Tempe, AZ
January 11, 2024; 9:00 p.m., ESPN2		at California	L 78–82	11–5 (2–3)	22 – Lampkin Jr.	11 – Lampkin Jr.	3 – Lampkin Jr.	Haas Pavilion (2,258); Berkeley, CA
January 13, 2024; 8:00 p.m., ESPN2		USC	W 68–58	12–5 (3–3)	15 – Hadley	9 – Hadley	4 – tied	CU Events Center (10,005); Boulder, CO
January 18, 2024; 8:30 p.m., FS1		Oregon	W 86–70	13–5 (4–3)	23 – Williams	8 – da Silva	5 – Simpson	CU Events Center (8,177); Boulder, CO
January 20, 2024; 5:00 p.m., P12N		Oregon State	W 90–57	14–5 (5–3)	19 – da Silva	8 – Lampkin Jr.	5 – Hammond III	CU Events Center (7,944); Boulder, CO
January 24, 2024; 9:00 p.m., ESPNU		at Washington	W 98–71	15–5 (6–3)	24 – Hadley	10 – Lampkin Jr.	8 – Simpson	Alaska Airlines Arena (5,210); Seattle, WA
January 27, 2024; 3:00 p.m., P12N		at Washington State	L 69–78	15–6 (6–4)	25 – Simpson	8 – Simpson	3 – da Silva	Beasley Coliseum (3,273); Pullman, WA
February 3, 2024; 3:00 p.m., P12N		at Utah; Rumble in the Rockies	L 68–73	15–7 (6–5)	25 – Simpson	10 – Lampkin Jr.	4 – Hammond III	Jon M. Huntsman Center (9,294); Salt Lake City, UT
February 8, 2024; 6:00 p.m., FS1		Arizona State	W 82–70	16–7 (7–5)	19 – Hadley	11 – Hadley	8 – Simpson	CU Events Center (7,109); Boulder, CO
February 10, 2024; 8:00 p.m., ESPN		No. 8 Arizona	L 79–99	16–8 (7–6)	20 – tied	6 – Hadley	9 – Simpson	CU Events Center (10,548); Boulder, CO
February 15, 2024; 7:00 p.m., ESPN		at UCLA	L 60–64	16–9 (7–7)	18 – Williams	7 – Simpson	5 – Simpson	Pauley Pavilion (7,183); Los Angeles, CA
February 17, 2024; 8:00 p.m., ESPN		at USC	W 92–89 ^{2OT}	17–9 (8–7)	30 – Simpson	10 – Hadley	5 – Simpson	Galen Center (6,142); Los Angeles, CA
February 24, 2024; 7:00 p.m., P12N		Utah; Rumble in the Rockies	W 89–65	18–9 (9–7)	28 – Simpson	9 – Hadley	4 – tied	CU Events Center (9,075); Boulder, CO
February 28, 2024; 6:00 p.m., P12N		California	W 88–78	19–9 (10–7)	27 – Simpson	8 – Lampkin Jr.	8 – Simpson	CU Events Center (6,926); Boulder, CO
March 3, 2024; 7:00 p.m., FS1		Stanford; Senior Night	W 81–71	20–9 (11–7)	27 – da Silva	11 – da Silva	7 – Simpson	CU Events Center (7,518); Boulder, CO
March 7, 2024; 7:00 p.m., ESPN2		at Oregon	W 79–75	21–9 (12–7)	22 – da Silva	12 – Hadley	6 – Simpson	Matthew Knight Arena (7,794); Eugene, OR
March 9, 2024; 3:00 p.m., P12N		at Oregon State	W 73–57	22–9 (13–7)	17 – Lampkin Jr.	11 – Lampkin Jr.	7 – Simpson	Gill Coliseum (3,172); Corvallis, OR
Pac-12 tournament
March 14, 2024; 9:30 p.m., FS1	(3)	vs. (6) Utah; Quarterfinals/Rivalry	W 72–58	23–9	18 – Simpson	12 – Lampkin Jr.	6 – Simpson	T-Mobile Arena (11,428); Paradise, NV
March 15, 2024; 8:30 p.m., FS1	(3)	vs. (2) No. 22 Washington State; Semifinals	W 58–52	24–9	16 – Simpson	7 – Simpson	4 – Hadley	T-Mobile Arena (17,502); Paradise, NV
March 16, 2024; 7:00 p.m., FOX	(3)	vs. (4) Oregon; Championship	L 68–75	24–10	23 – Simpson	7 – Simpson	5 – da Silva	T-Mobile Arena (12,912); Paradise, NV
NCAA tournament
March 20, 2024*; 7:10 p.m., TruTV	(10 S)	vs. (10 S) Boise State; First Four	W 60–53	25–10	20 – da Silva	11 – Simpson	4 – Simpson	UD Arena (12,039); Dayton, OH
March 22, 2024*; 2:30 p.m., TBS	(10 S)	vs. (7 S) Florida; First Round	W 102–100	26–10	23 – Simpson	6 – tied	5 – tied	Gainbridge Fieldhouse (16,702); Indianapolis, IN
March 24, 2024*; 10:10 a.m., CBS	(10 S)	vs. (2 S) No. 8 Marquette; Second Round	L 77–81	26–11	20 – Simpson	7 – Lampkin Jr.	7 – Simpson	Gainbridge Fieldhouse (16,770); Indianapolis, IN
*Non-conference game. ^{#}Rankings from AP poll. (#) Tournament seedings in parentheses. S=South Region. All times are in Mountain.

== Game summaries ==
=== MSU Denver (exhibition) ===
October 28, 2023
7:00 p.m. MDT

MSU Denver Roadrunners 45, Colorado Buffaloes 69
Scoring by half: 18–33, 27–36
Pts: Brayden Maldonado, 10; Rebs: Marzouq Ibn Abdur-Razaaq, 8 Asts: Brayden Maldonado, 2	Pts: Tristan da Silva, 11; Rebs: Luke O'Brien, 7 Asts: J'Vonne Hadley, 4

CU Events Center • Boulder, CO
Attendance: 902
Referees: Brooks Wells, Layne Barney, Jason Garretson

=== Towson ===
P12N

November 6, 2023
5:30 p.m. MST

Towson Tigers 57, Colorado Buffaloes 75
Scoring by half: 24–28, 33–47
Pts: Dylan Williamson, 15; Rebs: Christian May, 6 Asts: Dylan Williamson, 3	Pts: KJ Simpson, 22; Rebs: J'Vonne Hadley, 9 Asts: Tristan da Silva, 4

CU Events Center • Boulder, CO
Attendance: 6,078
Referees: Layne Barney, Mark Beasley, Verne Harris

=== Grambling State ===
P12N

November 10, 2023
6:00 p.m. MST

Grambling State Tigers 63, Colorado Buffaloes 95
Scoring by half: 20–50, 43–45
Pts: Tra'Michael Moton, 26; Rebs: Jalen Johnson, 4 Asts: Tra'Michael Moton, 5	Pts: Tristan da Silva, 21; Rebs: J'Vonne Hadley, 8 Asts: KJ Simpson, 8

CU Events Center • Boulder, CO
Attendance: 6,541
Referees: Marques Pettigrew, Eric Curry, Randy Richardson

=== Milwaukee ===
P12N

November 14, 2023
7:00 p.m. MST

Milwaukee Panthers 79, No. 25 Colorado Buffaloes 106
Scoring by half: 33–53, 46–53
Pts: Zach Howell, 15; Rebs: Kentrell Pullian, 6 Asts: BJ Freeman, 5	Pts: KJ Simpson, 23; Rebs: Eddie Lampkin Jr., 12; Asts: KJ Simpson, 6

CU Events Center • Boulder, CO
Attendance: 6,181
Referees: Brooks Wells, Ray Natili, Tony Padilla

=== vs Richmond ===
CBSSN

November 20, 2023
6:00 p.m. MST

Richmond Spiders 59, No. 18 Colorado Buffaloes 64
Scoring by half: 25–28, 34–36
Pts: Jordan King, 20; Rebs: Jordan King, 7 Asts: Mikkel Tyne, 2	Pts: KJ Simpson, 23; Rebs: Tristan da Silva, 8 Asts: J'Vonne Hadley, 3

Ocean Center • Daytona Beach, FL
Attendance: 2,153
Referees: Mark Schnur, Kellen Milliner, Deselle Dean

=== vs Florida State ===
CBSSN

November 21, 2023
2:00 p.m. MST

Florida State Seminoles 77, No. 18 Colorado Buffaloes 71 (OT)
Scoring by half: 27–30, 33–30 Overtime: 17–11
Pts: Jalen Warley, 19; Rebs: Jamir Watkins, 11; Asts: Jamir Watkins, 4	Pts: Cody Williams, 17; Rebs: Eddie Lampkin Jr., 11; Asts: Eddie Lampkin Jr., 4

Ocean Center • Daytona Beach, FL
Attendance: 1,502
Referees: Tom Deenan, David Powell, Les Jones

=== Iona ===
P12N

November 26, 2023
12:00 p.m. MST

Iona Gaels 68, No. 18 Colorado Buffaloes 85
Scoring by half: 37–42, 31–43
Pts: Greg Gordon, 19; Rebs: Idan Tretout, 3 Asts: Idan Tretout, 2	Pts: Tristan da Silva, 21; Rebs: Luke O'Brien, 7 Asts: KJ Simpson, 5

CU Events Center • Boulder, CO
Attendance: 6,346
Referees: Gerry Pollard, Keith Kimble, Ray Natili

=== at No. 20 Colorado State ===
CBSSN

November 29, 2023
7:00 p.m. MST

Colorado Buffaloes 83, No. 20 Colorado State Rams 88
Scoring by half: 26–41, 57–47
Pts: KJ Simpson, 30; Rebs: Tristan da Silva, 8 Asts: KJ Simpson, 4	Pts: Isaiah Stevens, 20; Rebs: Nique Clifford, 6 Asts: Isaiah Stevens, 11

Moby Arena • Fort Collins, CO
Attendance: 8,083
Referees: Brooks Wells, Gregory Nixon, Tony Padilla

=== Pepperdine ===
P12N

December 3, 2023
3:00 p.m. MST

Pepperdine Waves 66, Colorado Buffaloes 91
Scoring by half: 28–52, 38–39
Pts: Houston Mallette, 15; Rebs: Michael Ajayi, 6 Asts: Houston Mallette, 3	Pts: Tristan da Silva, 22; Rebs: Eddie Lampkin Jr., 10; Asts: Luke O'Brien, 4

CU Events Center • Boulder, CO
Attendance: 7,231
Referees: Marques Pettigrew, DG Nelson, Verne Harris

=== vs No. 15 Miami (FL) ===
ESPN2

December 10, 2023
12:00 p.m. MST

No. 15 Miami Hurricanes 63, Colorado Buffaloes 90
Scoring by half: 36–37, 27–53
Pts: Matthew Cleveland, 17; Rebs: Wooga Poplar, 5 Asts: Matthew Cleveland, 2	Pts: Tristan da Silva, 22; Rebs: Tristan da Silva, 10; Asts: Tristan da Silva, 9

Barclays Center • Brooklyn, NY
Attendance: 6,072
Referees: John Gaffney, Mike Palau, Michael Luckie

=== Northern Colorado ===
P12N

December 15, 2023
6:00 p.m. MST

Northern Colorado Bears 68, Colorado Buffaloes 90
Scoring by half: 27–48, 41–42
Pts: Saint Thomas, 27; Rebs: Saint Thomas, 9 Asts: Jaron Rillie, 6	Pts: KJ Simpson, 21; Rebs: Eddie Lampkin Jr., 10; Asts: J'Vonne Hadley, 6

CU Events Center • Boulder, CO
Attendance: 7,177
Referees: Tony Padilla, Keith Kimble, Verne Harris

=== Utah Tech ===
P12N

December 21, 2023
5:00 p.m. MST

Utah Tech Trailblazers 71, Colorado Buffaloes 98
Scoring by half: 25–46, 46–52
Pts: Aric Demings, 14; Rebs: Noa Gonsalves, 4 Asts: Aric Demings, 3	Pts: KJ Simpson, 23; Rebs: Eddie Lampkin Jr., 9 Asts: KJ Simpson, 6

CU Events Center • Boulder, CO
Attendance: 6,426
Referees: Gerry Pollard, Michael Irving, Scott Brown

=== Washington ===
ESPN2

December 21, 2023
7:00 p.m. MST

Washington Huskies 69, Colorado Buffaloes 73
Scoring by half: 26–32, 43–41
Pts: Keion Brooks Jr., 20; Rebs: Keion Brooks Jr., 8 Asts: Sahvir Wheeler, 7	Pts: KJ Simpson, 21; Rebs: Eddie Lampkin Jr., 12; Asts: KJ Simpson, 7

CU Events Center • Boulder, CO
Attendance: 7,799
Referees: Verne Harris, Marques Pettigrew, Kevin Brill

=== Washington State ===
P12N

December 31, 2023
12:00 p.m. MST

Washington State Cougars 67, Colorado Buffaloes 74
Scoring by half: 29–39, 38–35
Pts: Andrej Jakimovski, 19; Rebs: Isaac Jones, 8 Asts: Kymany Houinsou, 4	Pts: KJ Simpson, 34; Rebs: Julian Hammond III, 6 Asts: J'Vonne Hadley, 3

CU Events Center • Boulder, CO
Attendance: 6,952
Referees: Michael Irving, Keith Kimble, Roger Ayers

=== at No. 10 Arizona ===
ESPN

January 4, 2024
7:30 p.m. MST

Colorado Buffaloes 50, No. 10 Arizona Wildcats 97
Scoring by half: 23–50, 27–47
Pts: Javon Ruffin, 11; Rebs: KJ Simpson, 7 Asts: J'Vonne Hadley, 3	Pts: Pelle Larsson, 18; Rebs: Motiejus Krivas, 9 Asts: Kylan Boswell, 4

McKale Center • Tucson, AZ
Attendance: 14,286
Referees: Tony Padilla, Greg Nixon, DJ Carstensen

=== at Arizona State ===
ESPNU

January 6, 2024
6:00 p.m. MST

Colorado Buffaloes 73, Arizona State Sun Devils 76
Scoring by half: 38–44, 35–32
Pts: KJ Simpson, 23; Rebs: Eddie Lampkin Jr., 6 Asts: KJ Simpson, 4	Pts: Jamiya Neal, 19; Rebs: Jamiya Neal, 7 Asts: Frankie Collins, 4

Desert Financial Arena • Tempe, AZ
Attendance: 8,128
Referees: Deron White, DG Nelson, Michael Greenstein

=== at California ===
ESPN2

January 11, 2024
9:00 p.m. MST

Colorado Buffaloes 78, California Golden Bears 82
Scoring by half: 40–26, 38–56
Pts: Eddie Lampkin Jr., 22; Rebs: Eddie Lampkin Jr., 11; Asts: Eddie Lampkin Jr., 3	Pts: Jaylon Tyson, 30; Rebs: Fardaws Aimaq, 10; Asts: Jalen Cone, 3

Haas Pavilion • Berkeley, CA
Attendance: 2,258
Referees: Verne Harris, Gregory Nixon, Deldre Carr

=== USC ===
ESPN2

January 13, 2024
8:00 p.m. MST

USC Trojans 58, Colorado Buffaloes 68
Scoring by half: 37–24, 21–44
Pts: Oziyah Sellers, 18; Rebs: Vincent Iwuchukwu, 7 Asts: Kobe Johnson, 4	Pts: J'Vonne Hadley, 15; Rebs: J'Vonne Hadley, 9 Asts: Tristan da Silva, 4

CU Events Center • Boulder, CO
Attendance: 10,005
Referees: DG Nelson, De Selle Dean, Justin Shamion

=== Oregon ===
FS1

January 18, 2024
8:30 p.m. MST

Oregon Ducks 70, Colorado Buffaloes 86
Scoring by half: 34–43, 36–43
Pts: Jadrian Tracey, 14; Rebs: N'Faly Dante, 5 Asts: Jackson Shelstad, 2	Pts: Cody Williams, 23; Rebs: Tristan da Silva, 8 Asts: KJ Simpson, 5

CU Events Center • Boulder, CO
Attendance: 8,177
Referees: Brooks Wells, Kipp Kissinger, Gerry Pollard

=== Oregon State ===
P12N

January 20, 2024
5:00 p.m. MST

Oregon State Beavers 57, Colorado Buffaloes 90
Scoring by half: 23–45, 34–45
Pts: Tyler Bilodeau, 18; Rebs: Michael Rataj, 6 Asts: Josiah Lake, 2	Pts: Tristan da Silva, 19; Rebs: Eddie Lampkin Jr., 8 Asts: Julian Hammond III, 5

CU Events Center • Boulder, CO
Attendance: 7,944
Referees: Layne Barney, Scott Brown, Tony Padilla

=== at Washington ===
ESPNU

January 24, 2024
9:00 p.m. MST

Colorado Buffaloes 98, Washington Huskies 81
Scoring by half: 50–41, 48–40
Pts: J'Vonne Hadley, 24; Rebs: Eddie Lampkin Jr., 10; Asts: KJ Simpson, 8	Pts: Keion Brooks Jr., 22; Rebs: Moses Wood, 6 Asts: Koren Johnson, 7

Alaska Airlines Arena • Seattle, WA
Attendance: 5,210
Referees: Doug Shows, Eric Curry, Michael Irving

=== at Washington State ===
P12N

January 27, 2024
3:00 p.m. MST

Colorado Buffaloes 69, Washington State Cougars 78
Scoring by half: 30–36, 39–42
Pts: KJ Simpson, 25; Rebs: KJ Simpson, 8 Asts: Tristan da Silva, 3	Pts: Jaylen Wells, 17; Rebs: Isaac Jones, 11; Asts: Andrej Jakimovski, 4

Beasley Coliseum • Pullman, WA
Attendance: 3,273
Referees: Verne Harris, Doug Sturdivan, James Schipper

=== at Utah ===
P12N

February 3, 2024
3:00 p.m. MST

Colorado Buffaloes 68, Utah Utes 73
Scoring by half: 31–31, 37–42
Pts: KJ Simpson, 25; Rebs: Eddie Lampkin Jr., 10; Asts: Julian Hammond III, 4	Pts: Gabe Madsen, 21; Rebs: Deivon Smith, 11; Asts: Deivon Smith, 9

Jon M. Huntsman Center • Salt Lake City, UT
Attendance: 9,294
Referees: De Selle Dean, Michael Greenstein, Kipp Kissinger

=== Arizona State ===
FS1

February 8, 2024
6:00 p.m. MST

Arizona State Sun Devils 70, Colorado Buffaloes 82
Scoring by half: 35–44, 35–38
Pts: Frankie Collins, 18; Rebs: Alonzo Gaffney, 6 Asts: Jamiya Neal, 4	Pts: J'Vonne Hadley, 19; Rebs: J'Vonne Hadley, 11; Asts: KJ Simpson, 8

CU Events Center • Boulder, CO
Attendance: 7,109
Referees: Michael Reed, Earl Walton, Kelly Pfeifer

=== No. 8 Arizona ===
ESPN

February 10, 2024
8:00 p.m. MST

No. 8 Arizona Wildcats 99, Colorado Buffaloes 79
Scoring by half: 47–40, 52–39
Pts: Caleb Love, 19; Rebs: Oumar Ballo, 13; Asts: Kylan Boswell, 4	Pts: tied, 20; Rebs: J'Vonne Hadley, 6 Asts: KJ Simpson, 9

CU Events Center • Boulder, CO
Attendance: 10,548
Referees: Michael Irving, Randy Richardson, Ryan Holmes

=== at UCLA ===
ESPN

February 15, 2024
7:00 p.m. MST

Colorado Buffaloes 60, UCLA Bruins 64
Scoring by half: 29–38, 31–26
Pts: Cody Williams, 18; Rebs: KJ Simpson, 7 Asts: KJ Simpson, 5	Pts: Sebastian Mack, 19; Rebs: Adem Bona, 7 Asts: Will McClendon, 3

Pauley Pavilion • Los Angeles, CA
Attendance: 7,183
Referees: Roger Ayers, D.J. Carstensen, Paul Szelc

=== at USC ===
ESPN

February 17, 2024
8:00 p.m. MST

Colorado Buffaloes 92, USC Trojans 89 (2OT)
Scoring by half: 33–39, 40–34 Overtime: 10–10, 9–6
Pts: KJ Simpson, 30; Rebs: J'Vonne Hadley, 10; Asts: KJ Simpson, 5	Pts: Boogie Ellis, 30; Rebs: Boogie Ellis, 4 Asts: Isaiah Collier, 9

Galen Center • Los Angeles, CA
Attendance: 6,142
Referees: Mike Littlewood, Randy Richardson, Jason Garretson

=== Utah ===
P12N

February 24, 2024
7:00 p.m. MST

Utah Utes 65, Colorado Buffaloes 89
Scoring by half: 34–43, 31–46
Pts: Gabe Madsen, 18; Rebs: tied, 6 Asts: Deivon Smith, 5	Pts: KJ Simpson, 28; Rebs: J'Vonne Hadley, 9 Asts: tied, 4

CU Events Center • Boulder, CO
Attendance: 9,075
Referees: Earl Walton, Kelly Pfeifer, Layne Barney

=== California ===
P12N

February 28, 2024
6:00 p.m. MST

California Golden Bears 78, Colorado Buffaloes 88
Scoring by half: 31–45, 47–43
Pts: Jaylon Tyson, 25; Rebs: Fardaws Aimaq, 11; Asts: Jaylon Tyson, 4	Pts: KJ Simpson, 28; Rebs: Eddie Lampkin Jr., 8 Asts: KJ Simpson, 8

CU Events Center • Boulder, CO
Attendance: 6,926
Referees: Ray Natili, Gregory Nixon, Verne Harris

=== Stanford ===
FS1

March 3, 2024
7:00 p.m. MST

Stanford Cardinal 71, Colorado Buffaloes 81
Scoring by half: 37–44, 34–37
Pts: Maxime Raynaud, 26; Rebs: Maxime Raynaud, 12; Asts: Kanaan Carlyle, 3	Pts: Tristan da Silva, 27; Rebs: Tristan da Silva, 11; Asts: KJ Simpson, 7

CU Events Center • Boulder, CO
Attendance: 7,518
Referees: Tony Padilla, John Gaffney, Michael Reed

=== at Oregon ===
ESPN2

March 7, 2024
7:00 p.m. MST

Colorado Buffaloes 79, Oregon Ducks 75
Scoring by half: 37–37, 42–38
Pts: Tristan da Silva, 22; Rebs: J'Vonne Hadley, 12; Asts: KJ Simpson, 6	Pts: Jackson Shelstad, 23; Rebs: N'Faly Dante, 12; Asts: Jackson Shelstad, 6

Matthew Knight Arena • Eugene, OR
Attendance: 7,794
Referees: Randy Richardson, Earl Walton, Chance Moor

=== at Oregon State ===
P12N

March 9, 2024
3:00 p.m. MST

Colorado Buffaloes 73, Oregon State Beavers 57
Scoring by half: 41–27, 32–30
Pts: Eddie Lampkin Jr., 17; Rebs: Eddie Lampkin Jr., 11; Asts: KJ Simpson, 7	Pts: Dexter Akanno, 15; Rebs: Tyler Bilodeau, 7 Asts: Jordan Pope, 3

Gill Coliseum • Corvallis, OR
Attendance: 3,172
Referees: Michael Irving, Kelly Pfeifer, Justin Shamion

=== vs Utah (Pac-12 quarterfinal) ===
FS1

March 14, 2024
9:30 p.m. MDT

Utah Utes 58, Colorado Buffaloes 72
Scoring by half: 30–33, 28–39
Pts: Ben Carlson, 13; Rebs: Ben Carlson, 6 Asts: Deivon Smith, 5	Pts: KJ Simpson, 18; Rebs: Eddie Lampkin Jr., 12; Asts: KJ Simpson, 6

T-Mobile Arena • Paradise, NV
Attendance: 11,428
Referees: Michael Reed, Deron White, DG Nelson

=== vs No. 22 Washington State (Pac-12 semifinal) ===
FS1

March 15, 2024
8:30 p.m. MDT

No. 22 Washington State Cougars 52, Colorado Buffaloes 58
Scoring by half: 23–27, 29–31
Pts: Isaac Jones, 13; Rebs: Rueben Chinyelu, 8 Asts: Jaylen Wells, 4	Pts: KJ Simpson, 16; Rebs: KJ Simpson, 7 Asts: J'Vonne Hadley, 4

T-Mobile Arena • Paradise, NV
Attendance: 17,502
Referees: Gregory Nixon, Verne Harris, Michael Greenstein

=== vs Oregon (Pac-12 championship) ===
FS1

March 16, 2024
7:00 p.m. MDT

Oregon Ducks 75, Colorado Buffaloes 68
Scoring by half: 33–30, 42–38
Pts: N'Faly Dante, 25; Rebs: N'Faly Dante, 9 Asts: Jermaine Couisnard, 8	Pts: KJ Simpson, 23; Rebs: KJ Simpson, 7 Asts: Tristan da Silva, 5

T-Mobile Arena • Paradise, NV
Attendance: 12,912
Referees: Tony Padilla, Michael Reed, Marques Pettigrew

=== vs Boise State (First Four) ===
TruTV

March 20, 2024
7:10 p.m. MDT

Boise State Broncos 53, Colorado Buffaloes 60
Scoring by half: 24–26, 29–34
Pts: Chibuzo Agbo, 17; Rebs: O'Mar Stanley, 11; Asts: Max Rice, 2	Pts: Tristan da Silva, 20; Rebs: KJ Simpson, 11; Asts: KJ Simpson, 7

UD Arena • Dayton, OH
Attendance: 12,039
Referees: Steve Divine, Rob Riley, Michael Irving

=== vs Florida (first round) ===
TBS

March 22, 2024
2:30 p.m. MDT

Florida Gators 100, Colorado Buffaloes 102
Scoring by half: 45–45, 55–57
Pts: Walter Clayton Jr., 33; Rebs: Denzel Aberdeen, 9 Asts: Alex Condon, 6	Pts: KJ Simpson, 23; Rebs: tied, 6 Asts: tied, 5

Gainbridge Fieldhouse • Indianapolis, IN
Attendance: 16,702
Referees: Owen Shortt, Eric Curry, Bert Smith

=== vs No. 8 Marquette (second round) ===
CBS

March 24, 2024
1:10 p.m. MDT

No. 8 Marquette Golden Eagles 81, Colorado Buffaloes 77
Scoring by half: 45–34, 36–43
Pts: Tyler Kolek, 21; Rebs: Tyler Kolek, 5 Asts: Tyler Kolek, 11	Pts: KJ Simpson, 20; Rebs: Eddie Lampkin Jr., 7 Asts: KJ Simpson, 7

Gainbridge Fieldhouse • Indianapolis, IN
Attendance: 16,770
Referees: A.J. Desai, Doug Shows, Roger Ayers

== Rankings ==
Ranking movements Legend: ██ Increase in ranking ██ Decrease in ranking — = Not ranked RV = Received votes
	Week																				
Poll	Pre	1	2	3	4	5	6	7	8	9	10	11	12	13	14	15	16	17	18	19	Final
AP	RV	25	18	RV	RV	RV	RV	RV	RV	RV	—	RV	—	—	—	—	—	—	RV	RV	RV
Coaches	RV	RV	21	RV	—	RV	RV	RV	RV	—	—	—	—	—	—	—	—	—	RV	RV	RV
