= Tristan da Silva =

German basketball player (born 2001)

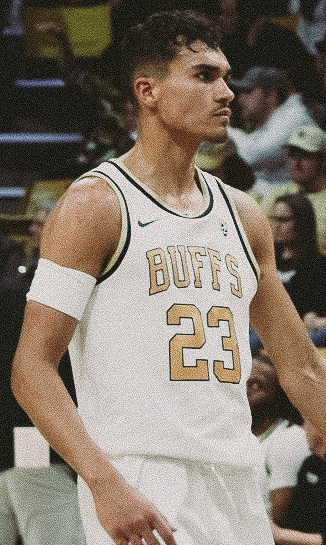
- da Silva with Colorado in 2024

No. 23 – Orlando Magic
- Position: Small forward
- League: NBA

Personal information
- Born: 15 May 2001 (age 25) Munich, Germany
- Listed height: 6 ft 8 in (2.03 m)
- Listed weight: 217 lb (98 kg)

Career information
- High school: Ludwigsgymnasium München (Munich, Germany)
- College: Colorado (2020–2024)
- NBA draft: 2024: 1st round, 18th overall pick
- Drafted by: Orlando Magic
- Playing career: 2024–present

Career history
- 2024–present: Orlando Magic

Career highlights
- First-team All-Pac-12 (2023); Second-team All-Pac-12 (2024)
- Stats at NBA.com
- Stats at Basketball Reference
Medals
Men's basketball
Representing Germany
EuroBasket
Gold medal – first place	2025 Cyprus–Finland–Poland–Latvia

Tristan da Silva (born 15 May 2001) is a Brazilian-German professional basketball player for the Orlando Magic of the National Basketball Association (NBA). He played college basketball for the Colorado Buffaloes.

== Early life ==
Da Silva was born and raised in Munich, Germany to a Brazilian father and a German mother. In 2019, he played simultaneously with Schwabing, in Germany's Regionalliga, and IBA München (International Basketball Academy, Munich), in the NBBL. In 12 games with IBA München, da Silva led the team in scoring at 16.9 points per game while shooting 53.2 percent.

Da Silva committed to playing college basketball in the United States for Colorado in the midst of COVID-19.

== College career ==
Da Silva played in 24 games and averaged 2.7 points and one rebound per game during his freshman season at Colorado. He became a starter going into his sophomore season and averaged 9.4 points and 3.5 rebounds over 31 games played.

Da Silva was named first-team All-Pac-12 as a junior after averaging 15.9 points, 4.8 rebounds, and 1.3 steals per game. In 2023, Da Silva registered his name for the NBA draft, but ended up returning to Colorado for his senior season. In his final season at Colorado, Da Silva averaged 16.0 points, 5.1 rebounds, and 2.4 assists per game, while shooting a career high 39.5% from 3 on 4.8 attempts a game. He was named second-team All-Pac-12.

Despite having remaining college eligibility, Da Silva declared for the NBA draft on April 29, 2024.

== Professional career ==
On 26 June 2024, Da Silva was selected with the 18th overall pick by the Orlando Magic in the 2024 NBA draft. He joined his college teammates Cody Williams and KJ Simpson in being selected, making Colorado one of just three programs to boast at least three draft picks in the 2024 draft. On 6 July, he signed with the Magic.

Da Silva made his NBA debut on October 23, 2024, in a 116–97 win over the Miami Heat.

== Career statistics ==
Legend
GP	Games played	GS	Games started	MPG	Minutes per game
FG%	Field goal percentage	3P%	3-point field goal percentage	FT%	Free throw percentage
RPG	Rebounds per game	APG	Assists per game	SPG	Steals per game
BPG	Blocks per game	PPG	Points per game	**Bold**	Career high

=== NBA ===
==== Regular season ====
Year	Team	GP	GS	MPG	FG%	3P%	FT%	RPG	APG	SPG	BPG	PPG
2024–25	Orlando	74	**38**	22.0	.412	.335	.873	3.3	1.5	.4	.2	7.2
2025–26	Orlando	**77**	34	**24.7**	**.450**	**.374**	**.884**	**3.7**	**1.6**	**.9**	**.3**	**9.9**
Career		151	72	23.4	.433	.357	.880	3.5	1.6	.7	.3	8.6

==== Playoffs ====
Year	Team	GP	GS	MPG	FG%	3P%	FT%	RPG	APG	SPG	BPG	PPG
2025	Orlando	2	0	2.5	.000	.000	—	2.0	**.5**	.0	.0	.0
2026	Orlando	**7**	0	**15.3**	**.379**	**.313**	**.500**	**2.9**	.1	**.1**	.0	**4.1**
Career		9	0	12.4	.367	.294	.500	2.7	.2	.1	.0	3.2

=== College ===
Year	Team	GP	GS	MPG	FG%	3P%	FT%	RPG	APG	SPG	BPG	PPG
2020–21	Colorado	24	0	9.3	**.529**	.267	.583	1.0	.3	.3	.1	2.7
2021–22	Colorado	31	31	28.3	.479	.373	.797	3.5	2.0	.6	.5	9.4
2022–23	Colorado	**35**	33	30.9	.496	.394	.755	4.8	1.3	**1.3**	.4	15.9
2023–24	Colorado	34	**34**	**33.8**	.493	**.395**	**.835**	**5.1**	**2.4**	1.1	**.6**	**16.0**
Career		124	98	26.9	.493	.386	.786	3.8	1.6	.9	.4	11.7

== Personal life ==
Da Silva's older brother, Oscar, played college basketball at Stanford and currently plays professionally for Bayern Munich. Their father was a professional boxer before immigrating to Germany in the 1990s and owns a Brazilian restaurant in Munich. Tristan speaks five languages: German, Portuguese, Spanish, French, and English.

His favorite team as a child was the Los Angeles Lakers. His favorite player is Luka Dončić. He likes music, acting and playing soccer. He even played the trumpet well, like a professional musician.
