= Kwame Evans Jr. =

American basketball player (born 2004)

No. 10 – Villanova Wildcats
- Position: Power forward
- Conference: Big East Conference

Personal information
- Born: August 2, 2004 (age 22) Baltimore, Maryland, U.S.
- Listed height: 6 ft 10 in (2.08 m)
- Listed weight: 220 lb (100 kg)

Career information
- High school: Baltimore Polytechnic Institute (Baltimore, Maryland); Montverde Academy (Montverde, Florida)
- College: Oregon (2023–2026); Villanova (2026–present)

Career highlights
- McDonald's All-American (2023); Jordan Brand Classic (2023)

Kwame Gumo "KJ" Evans Jr. (born August 2, 2004) is an American college basketball player for the Villanova Wildcats of the Big East Conference. He previously played for the Oregon Ducks.

== High school career ==
Evans attended Montverde Academy in Montverde, Florida. He transferred to Montverde from Baltimore Polytechnic Institute after his sophomore year. During his junior year, he helped lead Montverde to its second straight GEICO Nationals title and the school's third consecutive national championship overall, where he averaged 8 points and 6 rebounds over three games in the postseason. On January 24, 2023, Evans was selected as a McDonald's All-American.

=== Recruiting ===
Evans was considered a five-star recruit by ESPN and Rivals, and a four-star recruit by 247Sports. On August 2, 2022, he committed to playing college basketball for Oregon over offers from Arizona, Auburn and Kentucky.

College recruiting
Name	Hometown	School	Height	Weight	Commit date
Kwame Evans Jr. PF	Baltimore, MD	Montverde Academy (FL)	6 ft 9 in (2.06 m)	200 lb (91 kg)	Aug 2, 2022
Kwame Evans Jr. PF	Recruit ratings: Rivals: 247Sports: ESPN: (91)				
Overall recruit ranking: Rivals: 18 247Sports: 18 ESPN: 14
Note: In many cases, Scout, Rivals, 247Sports, On3, and ESPN may conflict in their listings of height and weight.; In these cases, the average was taken. ESPN grades are on a 100-point scale.; Sources: "Oregon 2023 Basketball Commitments". Rivals.; "2023 Oregon Ducks Recruiting Class". ESPN.; "2023 Team Ranking". Rivals.

== College career ==
As a freshman, Evans averaged 7.3 points and 4.9 rebounds per game. He averaged 6.1 points and 4.6 rebounds per game as a sophomore and shot 46.5% from the field. Evans averaged a career-high 13.3 points and 7.4 rebounds per game in his junior season. He opted to transfer to Villanova for his final season of eligibility.

== Career statistics ==
Legend
GP	Games played	GS	Games started	MPG	Minutes per game
FG%	Field goal percentage	3P%	3-point field goal percentage	FT%	Free throw percentage
RPG	Rebounds per game	APG	Assists per game	SPG	Steals per game
BPG	Blocks per game	PPG	Points per game	**Bold**	Career high

=== College ===
Year	Team	GP	GS	MPG	FG%	3P%	FT%	RPG	APG	SPG	BPG	PPG
2023–24	Oregon	36	29	22.5	.446	.267	.795	4.9	1.1	1.2	1.0	7.3

== Personal life ==
Evans' father, Kwame Sr., played college basketball at George Washington. His cousin, Che, currently plays college basketball for USC Upstate after transferring from San Diego State and UTEP.
