= 2023–24 Oregon Ducks men's basketball team =

American college basketball season

2023–24 Oregon Ducks men's basketball

Pac-12 Tournament champions

NCAA tournament, Second Round
- Conference: Pac-12 Conference
- Record: 24–12 (12–8 Pac-12)
- Head coach: Dana Altman (14th season)
- Assistant coaches: Brian Fish; Mike Mennenga; Louis Rowe
- Home arena: Matthew Knight Arena

2023–24 Pac-12 Conference men's basketball standings
	Conf.				Overall
Team	W		L	PCT	W		L	PCT
No. 11 Arizona	15	–	5	.750	27	–	9	.750
No. 23 Washington State	14	–	6	.700	25	–	10	.714
Colorado	13	–	7	.650	26	–	11	.703
Oregon †	12	–	8	.600	24	–	12	.667
UCLA	10	–	10	.500	16	–	17	.485
Utah	9	–	11	.450	22	–	15	.595
California	9	–	11	.450	13	–	19	.406
Washington	9	–	11	.450	17	–	15	.531
USC	8	–	12	.400	15	–	18	.455
Stanford	8	–	12	.400	14	–	18	.438
Arizona State	8	–	12	.400	14	–	18	.438
Oregon State	5	–	15	.250	13	–	19	.406
† 2024 Pac-12 tournament winner Rankings from AP Poll

The 2023–24 Oregon Ducks men's basketball team represented the University of Oregon during the 2023–24 NCAA Division I men's basketball season. The Ducks, led by 14th-year head coach Dana Altman, played their home games at Matthew Knight Arena as members of the Pac–12 Conference. They competed in the 2024 NCAA Tournament, clinching a spot after beating Colorado 75–68 in the Pac-12 Tournament final.

This was the final season that the Ducks were members of the Pac-12 conference, as they joined the Big Ten Conference on July 1, 2024.

== Previous season ==
The Ducks finished the season 21–15, 12–8 in Pac-12 play to finish in 4th place for the regular season. They defeated Washington State in the quarterfinals of the Pac-12 tournament before losing to UCLA in the semifinals. They did not receive an invitation to the NCAA tournament, but did receive a bid to the NIT tournament as a No. 1 seed. They defeated UC Irvine 84–58 in their first round matchup, and defeated UCF 68–54 in their second round matchup. They were defeated by Wisconsin 61–58 in the quarterfinals.

== Off-season ==
=== Departures ===
Oregon departures
Name	Number	Pos.	Height	Weight	Year	Hometown	Reason for departure
Kel'el Ware	10	C	7'0"	210	Freshman	North Little Rock, AR	Transferred to Indiana
Rivaldo Soares	11	G	6'6"	205	Senior	Boston, MA	Transferred to Oklahoma
Quincy Guerrier	0	F	6'8"	220	Senior	Montreal, Quebec	Transferred to Illinois
Tyrone Williams	2	G	6'5"	200	Senior	Philadelphia, PA	Transferred to Old Dominion
Lök Wur	15	F	6'9"	205	Senior	Omaha, Nebraska	Transferred to Grand Canyon
Ethan Butler	14	F	6'6"	205	Sophomore	Toronto, Ontario	Transferred to Northern Illinois

=== Incoming transfers ===
Oregon incoming transfers
Name	Number	Pos.	Height	Weight	Year	Hometown	Previous school
Kario Oquendo	13	G	6'4"	215	Senior	Titusville, FL	Transferred from Georgia
Jadrian Tracey	2	G	6'6"	210	Junior	Fort Myers, FL	Transferred from Florida SouthWestern State College
Jesse Zarzuela	34	G	6'3"	180	Junior	Houston, TX	Transferred from Central Michigan

=== 2023 recruiting class ===
College recruiting
Name	Hometown	School	Height	Weight	Commit date
Jackson Shelstad; PG	West Linn, OR	West Linn High School	6 ft 0 in (1.83 m)	170 lb (77 kg)	Nov 14, 2021
Jackson Shelstad; PG	Recruit ratings: Rivals: 247Sports: ESPN: (87)				
Kwame Evans Jr. PF	Baltimore, MD	Montverde Academy	6 ft 9 in (2.06 m)	200 lb (91 kg)	Aug 2, 2022
Kwame Evans Jr. PF	Recruit ratings: Rivals: 247Sports: ESPN: (91)				
Mookie Cook; SF	Portland, OR	Compass Prep	6 ft 7 in (2.01 m)	200 lb (91 kg)	Aug 12, 2022
Mookie Cook; SF	Recruit ratings: Rivals: 247Sports: ESPN: (89)				
Overall recruit ranking: Rivals: 7 247Sports: 8
Note: In many cases, Scout, Rivals, 247Sports, On3, and ESPN may conflict in their listings of height and weight.; In these cases, the average was taken. ESPN grades are on a 100-point scale.; Sources:

== Roster ==
2023–24 Oregon Ducks men's basketball team
Players
Coaches

Pos.	#	Name	Height	Weight	Year	Previous school	Hometown
G	0	Kario Oquendo	6 ft 4 in (1.93 m)	210 lb (95 kg)	Sr	Georgia	Titusville, Florida
C	1	N'Faly Dante	6 ft 11 in (2.11 m)	230 lb (104 kg)	GS	Sunrise Christian Academy	Bamako, Mali
G	2	Jesse Zarzuela	6 ft 3 in (1.91 m)	170 lb (77 kg)	Sr	Central Michigan	Houston, Texas
G	3	Jackson Shelstad	6 ft 0 in (1.83 m)	170 lb (77 kg)	Fr	West Linn High School	West Linn, Oregon
G/F	4	Brennan Rigsby	6 ft 5 in (1.96 m)	195 lb (88 kg)	Jr	NW Florida State	De Beque, Colorado
G/F	5	Jermaine Couisnard	6 ft 4 in (1.93 m)	210 lb (95 kg)	GS	South Carolina	East Chicago, Indiana
G	9	Keeshawn Barthelemy	6 ft 2 in (1.88 m)	175 lb (79 kg)	RS Sr	Colorado	Montreal, Quebec
F/C	10	Kwame Evans	6 ft 9 in (2.06 m)	220 lb (100 kg)	Fr	Montverde Academy	Baltimore, Maryland
F	11	Mookie Cook	6 ft 7 in (2.01 m)	200 lb (91 kg)	Fr	Compass Prep	Portland, Oregon
F	12	James Cooper (W)	6 ft 7 in (2.01 m)	210 lb (95 kg)	Jr	Mauldin HS	Mauldin, South Carolina
G	13	Jack Farnham (W)	6 ft 1 in (1.85 m)	160 lb (73 kg)	Fr	Notre Dame HS	Los Angeles, California
G/F	22	Jadrian Tracy	6 ft 6 in (1.98 m)	196 lb (89 kg)	RS Jr	Florida SouthWestern State College	Fort Myers, Florida
G	23	Gabe Reichle (W)	6 ft 2 in (1.88 m)	185 lb (84 kg)	Jr	Wilsonville HS	Wilsonville, Oregon
F	24	Mahamdou Diawara	6 ft 10 in (2.08 m)	250 lb (113 kg)	Sr	Stetson	Bamako, Mali
C	32	Nathan Bittle	7 ft 0 in (2.13 m)	215 lb (98 kg)	Jr	Prolific Prep	Central Point, Oregon

Head coach

- Dana Altman (Eastern New Mexico)

Assistant coach(es)

- Mike Mennenga (Morehead State)
- Brian Fish (Marshall)
- Louis Rowe (James Madison)

Legend

- (C) Team captain
- (S) Suspended
- (I) Ineligible
- (W) Walk-on
- Injured
- Current redshirt

Roster

== Schedule and results ==
Date time, TV	Rank^{#}	Opponent^{#}	Result	Record	High points	High rebounds	High assists	Site (attendance) city, state
Non-conference regular season
November 6, 2023*; 1:30 p.m., TruTV		vs. Georgia; 2023 Hall of Fame Series	W 82–71	1–0	16 – Dante	21 – Dante	5 – Couisnard	T-Mobile Arena (–); Paradise, NV
November 10, 2023*; 6:00 p.m., P12N		Montana	W 75–61	2–0	17 – Bittle	10 – Evans Jr.	3 – Tied	Matthew Knight Arena (7,141); Eugene, OR
November 17, 2023*; 6:00 p.m., P12N		Tennessee State; Emerald Coast Classic campus site game	W 92–67	3–0	15 – Tracey	8 – Evans Jr.	6 – Barthelemy	Matthew Knight Arena (5,279); Eugene, OR
November 20, 2023*; 5:00 p.m., ESPN+		at Florida A&M; Pac-12/SWAC Legacy Series	W 67–54	4–0	14 – Zarzuela	6 – Tracey	1 – Tied	Al Lawson Center (2,587); Tallahassee, FL
November 24, 2023*; 7:02 p.m., CBSSN		vs. Santa Clara; Emerald Coast Classic semifinals	L 82–88	4–1	17 – Barthelemy	6 – Tied	4 – Oquendo	The Arena at NFSC (2,196); Niceville, FL
November 25, 2023*; 1:00 p.m., FloHoops		vs. No. 17 Alabama; Emerald Coast Classic 3rd place game	L 91–99	4–2	24 – Couisnard	6 – Diawara	6 – Cousinard	The Arena at NFSC (2,196); Niceville, FL
December 2, 2023*; 12:30 p.m., FS1		Michigan	W 86–83 ^{OT}	5–2	19 – Rigsby	7 – Tracey	6 – Couisnard	Matthew Knight Arena (11,241); Eugene, OR
December 9, 2023*; 6:00 p.m., P12N		UTEP	W 71–49	6–2	18 – Couisnard	9 – Diawara	3 – Tied	Matthew Knight Arena (5,084); Eugene, OR
December 12, 2023*; 7:00 p.m., P12N		California Baptist	W 76–55	7–2	20 – Oquendo	8 – Couisnard	8 – Shelstad	Matthew Knight Arena (4,582); Eugene, OR
December 17, 2023*; 10:00 a.m., CBSSN		vs. Syracuse	L 63–83	7–3	17 – Evans Jr.	8 – Evans Jr.	3 – Tied	Sanford Pentagon (3,138); Sioux Falls, SD
December 21, 2023*; 6:00 p.m., P12N		Kent State	W 84–70	8–3	27 – Couisnard	10 – Couisnard	5 – Shelstad	Matthew Knight Arena (5,056); Eugene, OR
Pac-12 regular season
December 28, 2023; 6:00 p.m., ESPN2		USC	W 82–74	9–3 (1–0)	22 – Evans Jr.	8 – Evans Jr.	3 – Couisnard	Matthew Knight Arena (8,934); Eugene, OR
December 30, 2023; 1:00 p.m., CBS		UCLA	W 64–59	10–3 (2–0)	20 – Shelstad	8 – Evans Jr.	4 – Tracey	Matthew Knight Arena (7,268); Eugene, OR
January 4, 2024; 6:00 p.m., P12N		at Washington	W 76–74	11–3 (3–0)	17 – Shelstad	8 – Tied	5 – Barthelemy	Alaska Airlines Arena (8,522); Seattle, WA
January 6, 2024; 3:00 p.m., P12N		at Washington State	W 89–84	12–3 (4–0)	18 – Rigsby	7 – Couisnard	3 – Tied	Beasley Coliseum (2,892); Pullman, WA
January 13, 2024; 5:00 p.m., P12N		California	W 80–73	13–3 (5–0)	18 – Couisnard	6 – Shelstad	5 – Barthelemy	Matthew Knight Arena (6,748); Eugene, OR
January 18, 2024; 7:30 p.m., FS1		at Colorado	L 70–86	13–4 (5–1)	11 – Couisnard	5 – Dante	2 – Tied	CU Events Center (8,177); Boulder, CO
January 21, 2024; 12:00 p.m., ESPN		at Utah	L 77–80	13–5 (5–2)	26 – Couisnard	9 – Dante	5 – Dante	Jon M. Huntsman Center (7,919); Salt Lake City, UT
January 25, 2024; 6:00 p.m., P12N		Arizona State	W 80–61	14–5 (6–2)	19 – Couisnard	8 – Tracey	4 – Tracey	Matthew Knight Arena (6,170); Eugene, OR
January 27, 2024; 2:30 p.m., FOX		No. 9 Arizona	L 78–87	14–6 (6–3)	20 – Couisnard	5 – Tied	5 – Couisnard	Matthew Knight Arena (12,364); Eugene, OR
February 1, 2024; 7:30 p.m., ESPN		at USC	W 78–69	15–6 (7–3)	20 – Shelstad	7 – Couisnard	5 – Shelstad	Galen Center (4,862); Los Angeles, CA
February 3, 2024; 7:00 p.m., ESPN2		at UCLA	L 63–71	15–7 (7–4)	16 – Dante	8 – Dante	4 – Dante	Pauley Pavilion (8,723); Los Angeles, CA
February 8, 2024; 7:00 p.m., FS1		Washington	W 85–80	16–7 (8–4)	27 – Couisnard	9 – Dante	6 – Shelstad	Matthew Knight Arena (7,617); Eugene, OR
February 10, 2024; 2:00 p.m., P12N		Washington State	L 56–62	16–8 (8–5)	16 – Couisnard	13 – Dante	4 – Shelstad	Matthew Knight Arena (7,617); Eugene, OR
February 17, 2024; 7:00 p.m., P12N		at Oregon State; Rivalry	W 60–58	17–8 (9–5)	22 – Dante	8 – Tied	5 – Tracey	Gill Coliseum (7,574); Corvallis, OR
February 22, 2024; 8:00 p.m., ESPN2		at Stanford	W 78–65	18–8 (10–5)	20 – Tracey	11 – Dante	7 – Shelstad	Maples Pavilion (3,284); Stanford, CA
February 24, 2024; 6:00 p.m., P12N		at California	L 64–69	18–9 (10–6)	19 – Couisnard	9 – Dante	3 – Couisnard	Haas Pavilion (6,105); Berkeley, CA
February 28, 2024; 8:00 p.m., FS1		Oregon State; Rivalry	W 78–71	19–9 (11–6)	22 – Evans	9 – Evans	6 – Cousinard	Matthew Knight Arena (8,365); Eugene, OR
March 2, 2024; 11:00 a.m., ESPN		at No. 6 Arizona	L 83–103	19–10 (11–7)	39 – Couisnard	10 – Dante	5 – Couisnard	McKale Center (14,688); Tucson, AZ
March 7, 2024; 6:00 p.m., ESPN2		Colorado	L 75–79	19–11 (11–8)	23 – Shelstad	12 – Dante	6 – Shelstad	Matthew Knight Arena (7,794); Eugene, OR
March 9, 2024; 4:00 p.m., P12N		Utah	W 66–65	20–11 (12–8)	19 – Dante	12 – Dante	4 – Couisnard	Matthew Knight Arena (8,668); Eugene, OR
Pac-12 Tournament
March 14, 2024; 2:30 p.m., P12N	(4)	vs. (5) UCLA; Quarterfinals	W 68–66	21–11	22 – Dante	7 – Couisnard	6 – Couisnard	T-Mobile Arena (14,076); Paradise, NV
March 15, 2024; 5:00 p.m., P12N	(4)	vs. (1) No. 6 Arizona; Semifinals	W 67–59	22–11	21 – Shelstad	10 – Dante	7 – Cousinard	T-Mobile Arena (17,502); Paradise, NV
March 16, 2024; 6:00 p.m., FOX	(4)	vs. (3) Colorado; Championship	W 75–68	23–11	25 – Dante	9 – Dante	8 – Couisnard	T-Mobile Arena (12,912); Paradise, NV
NCAA tournament
March 21, 2024*; 1:00 p.m., TNT	(11 MW)	vs. (6 MW) No. 16 South Carolina; First Round	W 87–73	24–11	40 – Couisnard	6 – Tied	6 – Couisnard	PPG Paints Arena (17,698); Pittsburgh, PA
March 23, 2024*; 6:40 p.m., TBS	(11 MW)	vs. (3 MW) No. 11 Creighton; Second Round	L 73–86 ^{2OT}	24–12	32 – Couisnard	20 – Dante	5 – Tracey	PPG Paints Arena (18,595); Pittsburgh, PA
*Non-conference game. ^{#}Rankings from AP Poll. (#) Tournament seedings in parentheses. MW=Midwest region. All times are in Pacific Time.

== Ranking movement ==
Ranking movements Legend: ██ Increase in ranking ██ Decrease in ranking — = Not ranked RV = Received votes
	Week																				
Poll	Pre	1	2	3	4	5	6	7	8	9	10	11	12	13	14	15	16	17	18	19	Final
AP	—	—	—	—	—	—	—	—	—	—	RV	RV	—	—	—	—	—	—	—	—	RV
Coaches	RV	—	RV	RV	—	—	—	—	—	—	—	RV	—	—	—	—	—	—	—	—	RV
