= 2023–24 Utah Utes men's basketball team =

American college basketball season

2023–24 Utah Utes men's basketball

NIT, Semifinals
- Conference: Pac-12 Conference
- Record: 22–15 (9–11 Pac-12)
- Head coach: Craig Smith (3rd season)
- Assistant coaches: Tramel Barnes; Chris Burgess; DeMarlo Slocum
- Home arena: Jon M. Huntsman Center (Capacity: 15,000)

2023–24 Pac-12 Conference men's basketball standings
	Conf.				Overall
Team	W		L	PCT	W		L	PCT
No. 11 Arizona	15	–	5	.750	27	–	9	.750
No. 23 Washington State	14	–	6	.700	25	–	10	.714
Colorado	13	–	7	.650	26	–	11	.703
Oregon †	12	–	8	.600	24	–	12	.667
UCLA	10	–	10	.500	16	–	17	.485
Utah	9	–	11	.450	22	–	15	.595
California	9	–	11	.450	13	–	19	.406
Washington	9	–	11	.450	17	–	15	.531
USC	8	–	12	.400	15	–	18	.455
Stanford	8	–	12	.400	14	–	18	.438
Arizona State	8	–	12	.400	14	–	18	.438
Oregon State	5	–	15	.250	13	–	19	.406
† 2024 Pac-12 tournament winner Rankings from AP Poll

The 2023–24 Utah Runnin' Utes men's basketball team represented the University of Utah during the 2023–24 NCAA Division I men's basketball season. The team was led by third-year head coach Craig Smith. They played their home games at the Jon M. Huntsman Center in Salt Lake City, Utah.

Utah started the season with strong non-conference play, winning landmark games on the road against Saint Mary's and at home against then #14th-ranked BYU. Prior to their final out-of-conference game against Bellarmine, Utah received the 29th-most votes in that week's AP poll and were projected to be a 9th-seed in that year's NCAA Division I men's basketball tournament. Despite being dominant at home, even giving UCLA their second-worst loss in program history, the Runnin' Utes failed to win all but one conference road game, scoring a last-second basket to beat the same team in Pauley Pavilion. After home losses to Arizona and Arizona State, Utah was considered to be on the bubble for an NCAA tournament bid. After a road loss to Oregon State in which Branden Carlson scored a career-high 40 points, it was reported that "Utah’s NCAA tournament hopes were all but extinguished".

This season, Branden Carlson broke the all-time Runnin' Utes blocks record, finishing the season with 241 blocks. Incoming transfer Deivon Smith was unable to play until December due to double-transfer eligibility rules, but was able to debut in Utah's game against Utah Valley University after judge John P. Bailey extended a temporary restraining order in a lawsuit against the NCAA to the end of the season. After becoming eligible, Smith would go on to score five triple-doubles in the rest of the season, breaking the all-time Pac-12 record that was previously held by Jason Kidd.

In the 2024 Pac-12 men's tournament, Utah won their first round game against Arizona State before falling to Colorado in the quarterfinals. The team played in the 2024 National Invitation Tournament, being the only Pac-12 team to accept one of two automatic bids for teams in the conference. This marked the program's first appearance in a postseason tournament since the 2018 NIT six years prior. Utah advanced to the semi-finals before being eliminated by the Indiana State Sycamores.

This was their final season as members of the Pac-12 Conference after 12 years before they will join the Big 12 Conference in the 2024–25 season.

== Previous season ==
The Utes finished the 2022–23 season 17–14, 10–10 in Pac-12 play, to finish in 7th place. They lost in the first round of the Pac-12 tournament to Stanford.

== Offseason ==
=== Departures ===
Name	Num	Pos.	Height	Weight	Year	Hometown	Reason for departure
Gavin Baxter	0	F	6'9"	224	Senior	Provo, UT	Retired from basketball due to injuries
Mike Saunders Jr.	2	G	6'0"	184	Junior	Indianapolis, IN	Transferred to McNeese State
Bostyn Holt	3	F	6'6"	193	Senior	Portland, OR	Graduate transferred to South Dakota
Jaxon Brenchley	5	G	6'5"	195	Senior	Providence, UT	Graduate transferred to Denver
Marco Anthony	10	G	6'5"	223	RS Senior	San Antonio, TX	Graduated
Lazar Stefanović	20	G	6'7"	185	Sophomore	Belgrade, Serbia	Transferred to UCLA
Eli Ballstaedt	32	G	6'5"	198	Senior	Midway, UT	Walk-on; graduated

=== Incoming transfers ===
Name	Num	Pos.	Height	Weight	Year	Hometown	Previous school
Hunter Erickson	0	G	6'3"	195	Junior	Provo, UT	Salt Lake CC
Cole Bajema	2	G	6'7"	190	GS Senior	Lynden, WA	Washington
Deivon Smith	5	G	6'1"	172	Senior	Loganville, GA	Georgia Tech
Lawson Lovering	34	C	7'1"	225	Junior	Cheyenne, WY	Colorado

=== Recruiting classes ===
==== 2023 recruiting class ====
College recruiting information
Name	Hometown	School	Height	Weight	Commit date
Jake Wahlin #42 PF	Provo, UT	Timpview High School	6 ft 7 in (2.01 m)	180 lb (82 kg)	May 22, 2023
Jake Wahlin #42 PF	Recruit ratings: Rivals: 247Sports: ESPN: (75)				
Overall recruit ranking:
Note: In many cases, Scout, Rivals, 247Sports, On3, and ESPN may conflict in their listings of height and weight.; In these cases, the average was taken. ESPN grades are on a 100-point scale.; Sources: "2023 Utah Basketball Commitment List". Rivals.; "Utah Utes 2023 Player Commits". ESPN.; "2023 Team Ranking". Rivals.

==== 2024 recruiting class ====
College recruiting information (2024)
Name	Hometown	School	Height	Weight	Commit date
David Katoa #43 SG	Salt Lake City, UT	Real Salt Lake Academy	6 ft 4 in (1.93 m)	185 lb (84 kg)	Sep 26, 2023
David Katoa #43 SG	Recruit ratings: Rivals: 247Sports: ESPN: (75)				
Overall recruit ranking:
Note: In many cases, Scout, Rivals, 247Sports, On3, and ESPN may conflict in their listings of height and weight.; In these cases, the average was taken. ESPN grades are on a 100-point scale.; Sources: "2024 Utah Basketball Commitment List". Rivals.; "Utah Utes 2024 Player Commits". ESPN.; "2024 Team Ranking". Rivals.

== Roster ==
2023–24 Utah Utes men's basketball team
Players
Coaches

Pos.	#	Name	Height	Weight	Year	Previous school	Hometown
G	0	Hunter Erickson	6 ft 3 in (1.91 m)	194 lb (88 kg)	Jr	Salt Lake CC	Provo, UT
F	1	Ben Carlson	6 ft 9 in (2.06 m)	228 lb (103 kg)	Sr	Wisconsin	Woodbury, MN
G	2	Cole Bajema	6 ft 7 in (2.01 m)	194 lb (88 kg)	GS	Washington	Lynden, WA
G	3	Jayden Teat (W)	6 ft 1 in (1.85 m)	178 lb (81 kg)	Fr	Capital Christian School	Sacramento, CA
G	5	Deivon Smith	6 ft 1 in (1.85 m)	172 lb (78 kg)	Sr	Georgia Tech	Loganville, GA
F	10	Jake Wahlin	6 ft 10 in (2.08 m)	206 lb (93 kg)	Fr	Timpview	Provo, UT
G	11	Wilguens Exacte Jr.	6 ft 6 in (1.98 m)	233 lb (106 kg)	So	NBA Academy Latin America	Montreal, QC
C	13	Keba Keita	6 ft 8 in (2.03 m)	235 lb (107 kg)	So	Wasatch Academy	Bamako, Mali
G	14	Brandon Haddock (W)	6 ft 1 in (1.85 m)	178 lb (81 kg)	Jr	Carroll HS	Southlake, TX
G	21	Luka Tarlac	6 ft 7 in (2.01 m)	224 lb (102 kg)	So	International School of Belgrade	Belgrade, Serbia
G	25	Rollie Worster	6 ft 4 in (1.93 m)	204 lb (93 kg)	Sr	Utah State	Missoula, MT
F	32	Ayomide Bamisile (W)	6 ft 7 in (2.01 m)	198 lb (90 kg)	Fr	Montverde Academy	Lagos, Nigeria
C	34	Lawson Lovering	7 ft 1 in (2.16 m)	244 lb (111 kg)	Jr	Colorado	Cheyenne, WY
C	35	Branden Carlson	7 ft 0 in (2.13 m)	223 lb (101 kg)	GS	Bingham HS	South Jordan, UT
G	45	Jerry Huang (W)	6 ft 2 in (1.88 m)	187 lb (85 kg)	Fr	Wasatch Academy	Taipei, Taiwan
G	55	Gabe Madsen	6 ft 6 in (1.98 m)	203 lb (92 kg)	Sr	Cincinnati	Rochester, MN

Head coach

- Craig Smith (North Dakota)

Assistant coach(es)

- Tramel Barnes (Southwest Minnesota State)
- Chris Burgess (Utah)
- DeMarlo Slocum (Georgia Southern)

Legend

- (C) Team captain
- (S) Suspended
- (I) Ineligible
- (W) Walk-on
- Injured
- Current redshirt

Roster
Last update: April 8, 2024

== Schedule and results ==
Date time, TV	Rank^{#}	Opponent^{#}	Result	Record	High points	High rebounds	High assists	Site (attendance) city, state
Exhibition
November 1, 2023*; 6:00 p.m.		Westminster	W 84–61	–	18 – Bajema	9 – Be. Carlson	4 – Bajema	Jon M. Huntsman Center (–); Salt Lake City, UT
Non-conference regular season
November 6, 2023*; 7:30 p.m., P12N		Eastern Washington	W 101–66	1–0	20 – Madsen	11 – Keita	8 – Worster	Jon M. Huntsman Center (7,632); Salt Lake City, UT
November 10, 2023*; 8:00 p.m., P12N		UC Riverside	W 82–53	2–0	18 – Lovering	7 – tied	7 – Worster	Jon M. Huntsman Center (7,565); Salt Lake City, UT
November 16, 2023*; 7:00 p.m., ESPNU		vs. Wake Forest; Charleston Classic quarterfinals	W 77–70	3–0	31 – Br. Carlson	7 – Be. Carlson	9 – Worster	TD Arena (2,745); Charleston, SC
November 17, 2023*; 2:30 p.m., ESPN2		vs. No. 6 Houston; Charleston Classic semifinals	L 66–76	3–1	29 – Madsen	8 – tied	6 – Worster	TD Arena (3,029); Charleston, SC
November 19, 2023*; 3:30 p.m., ESPN		vs. St. John's; Charleston Classic third-place game	L 82–91	3–2	22 – Br. Carlson	8 – Br. Carlson	3 – tied	TD Arena (3,841); Charleston, SC
November 27, 2023*; 9:00 p.m., ESPNU		at Saint Mary's	W 78–71	4–2	17 – tied	8 – Worster	3 – Br. Carlson	University Credit Union Pavilion (3,500); Moraga, CA
November 30, 2023*; 7:00 p.m., P12N		vs. Hawai'i	W 79–66	5–2	17 – Br. Carlson	9 – Worster	3 – Worster	Delta Center (4,686); Salt Lake City, UT
December 5, 2023*; 7:00 p.m., P12N		Southern Utah	W 88–86	6–2	23 – Keita	10 – Be. Carlson	10 – Worster	Jon M. Huntsman Center (7,161); Salt Lake City, UT
December 9, 2023*; 5:00 p.m., P12N		No. 14 BYU; Rivalry	W 73–69	7–2	17 – Madsen	8 – Br. Carlson	8 – Worster	Jon M. Huntsman Center (15,648); Salt Lake City, UT
December 16, 2023*; 2:00 p.m., P12N		Utah Valley	W 76–62	8–2	26 – Br. Carlson	11 – Lovering	9 – Worster	Jon M. Huntsman Center (8,349); Salt Lake City, UT
December 20, 2023*; 7:00 p.m., P12N		Bellarmine	W 85–43	9–2	17 – Lovering	9 – Be. Carlson	4 – Worster	Jon M. Huntsman Center (7,310); Salt Lake City, UT
Pac-12 regular season
December 29, 2023; 6:30 p.m., P12N		Washington State	W 80–58	10–2 (1–0)	20 – Madsen	11 – Keita	7 – Worster	Jon M. Huntsman Center (8,235); Salt Lake City, UT
December 31, 2023; 4:00 p.m., P12N		Washington	W 95–90	11–2 (2–0)	34 – Br. Carlson	11 – Madsen	7 – Br. Carlson	Jon M. Huntsman Center (7,468); Salt Lake City, UT
January 4, 2024; 9:00 p.m., ESPN2		at Arizona State	L 70–82	11–3 (2–1)	19 – Br. Carlson	8 – Br. Carlson	5 – Madsen	Desert Financial Arena (6,259); Tempe, AZ
January 6, 2024; 6:00 p.m., P12N		at No. 10 Arizona	L 73–92	11–4 (2–2)	18 – Madsen	6 – Be. Carlson	5 – Worster	McKale Center (14,688); Tucson, AZ
January 11, 2024; 7:00 p.m., ESPN2		UCLA	W 90–44	12–4 (3–2)	14 – tied	14 – Br. Carlson	8 – Smith	Jon M. Huntsman Center (8,934); Salt Lake City, UT
January 14, 2024; 3:00 p.m., P12N		at Stanford	L 73–79	12–5 (3–3)	16 – tied	10 – Smith	11 – Smith	Maples Pavilion (3,037); Stanford, CA
January 18, 2024; 7:00 p.m., ESPNU		Oregon State	W 74–47	13–5 (4–3)	18 – Keita	15 – Keita	8 – D. Smith	Jon M. Huntsman Center (8,063); Salt Lake City, UT
January 21, 2024; 1:00 p.m., ESPN		Oregon	W 80–77	14–5 (5–3)	24 – Smith	9 – Smith	8 – Smith	Jon M. Huntsman Center (7,919); Salt Lake City, UT
January 24, 2024; 8:00 p.m., P12N		at Washington State	L 57–79	14–6 (5–4)	20 – Br. Carlson	9 – Keita	3 – tied	Beasley Coliseum (2,605); Pullman, WA
January 27, 2024; 8:00 p.m., ESPN2		at Washington	L 73–98	14–7 (5–5)	20 – Smith	7 – Keita	3 – tied	Alaska Airlines Arena (7,419); Seattle, WA
February 3, 2024; 3:00 p.m., P12N		Colorado; Rivalry	W 73–68	15–7 (6–5)	21 – Madsen	11 – Smith	9 – Smith	Jon M. Huntsman Center (9,294); Salt Lake City, UT
February 8, 2024; 6:00 p.m., P12N		No. 8 Arizona	L 99–105 ^{3OT}	15–8 (6–6)	27 – Br. Carlson	15 – Br. Carlson	10 – D. Smith	Jon M. Huntsman Center (10,944); Salt Lake City, UT
February 10, 2024; 6:00 p.m., ESPN2		Arizona State	L 77–85	15–9 (6–7)	25 – Br. Carlson	11 – Br. Carlson	9 – Smith	Jon M. Huntsman Center (8,235); Salt Lake City, UT
February 15, 2024; 9:00 p.m., FS1		at USC	L 64–68	15–10 (6–8)	19 – Smith	9 – Smith	7 – Smith	Galen Center (5,122); Los Angeles, CA
February 18, 2024; 5:00 p.m., FS1		at UCLA	W 70–69	16–10 (7–8)	17 – tied	7 – Br. Carlson	10 – Smith	Pauley Pavilion (9,537); Los Angeles, CA
February 24, 2024; 7:00 p.m., P12N		at Colorado; Rivalry	L 65–89	16–11 (7–9)	18 – Madsen	6 – tied	5 – Smith	CU Events Center (9,075); Boulder, CO
February 29, 2024; 6:30 p.m., P12N		Stanford	W 90–68	17–11 (8–9)	21 – Bajema	10 – Smith	10 – Smith	Jon M. Huntsman Center (8,833); Salt Lake City, UT
March 2, 2024; 7:00 p.m., P12N		California; Senior Night	W 88–59	18–11 (9–9)	30 – Br. Carlson	10 – tied	10 – Smith	Jon M. Huntsman Center (8,841); Salt Lake City, UT
March 7, 2024; 9:00 p.m., ESPNU		at Oregon State	L 85–92	18–12 (9–10)	40 – Br. Carlson	7 – Br. Carlson	10 – Smith	Gill Coliseum (3,362); Corvallis, OR
March 9, 2024; 5:00 p.m., P12N		at Oregon	L 65–66	18–13 (9–11)	19 – Br. Carlson	6 – Smith	4 – Lovering	Matthew Knight Arena (8,668); Eugene, OR
Pac-12 tournament
March 13, 2024; 9:30 p.m., P12N	(6)	vs. (11) Arizona State; First Round	W 90–57	19–13	22 – Baejma	10 – tied	9 – Smith	T-Mobile Arena (10,133); Paradise, NV
March 14, 2024; 9:30 p.m., FS1	(6)	vs. (3) Colorado; Quarterfinal/rivalry	L 58–72	19–14	13 – tied	6 – tied	5 – Smith	T-Mobile Arena (11,428); Paradise, NV
NIT
March 19, 2024*; 9:00 p.m., ESPN2	(2)	UC Irvine; First Round – Villanova bracket	W 84–75	20–14	21 – Br. Carlson	11 – Br. Carlson	10 – Smith	Jon M. Huntsman Center (3,137); Salt Lake City, UT
March 24, 2024*; 7:00 p.m., ESPN2	(2)	(3) Iowa; Second Round – Villanova bracket	W 91–82	21–14	31 – Madsen	10 – tied	10 – Smith	Jon M. Huntsman Center (3,804); Salt Lake City, UT
March 27, 2024*; 7:00 p.m., ESPN2	(2)	VCU; Quarterfinals – Villanova bracket	W 74–54	22–14	18 – Madsen	11 – Smith	12 – Smith	Jon M. Huntsman Center (6,008); Salt Lake City, UT
April 2, 2024*; 5:00 p.m., ESPN	(2)	vs. (1) Indiana State; Semifinals	L 90–100	22–15	28 – Smith	7 – Smith	6 – Smith	Hinkle Fieldhouse; Indianapolis, IN
*Non-conference game. ^{#}Rankings from AP poll. (#) Tournament seedings in parentheses. All times are in Mountain Time.

== Rankings ==
Ranking movements Legend: ██ Increase in ranking ██ Decrease in ranking — = Not ranked RV = Received votes
	Week																			
Poll	Pre	1	2	3	4	5	6	7	8	9	10	11	12	13	14	15	16	17	18	Final
AP	—	—	—	—	—	RV	RV	RV	RV	RV	RV	RV	RV	—						
Coaches	—	—	—	—	—	RV	RV	RV	RV	—	—	—	RV	—						

*AP does not release post-NCAA tournament rankings.
