= 2023–24 Washington State Cougars men's basketball team =

American college basketball season

2023–24 Washington State Cougars men's basketball

NCAA tournament, Second Round
- Conference: Pac-12 Conference

Ranking
- Coaches: No. 24
- AP: No. 23
- Record: 25–10 (14–6 Pac-12)
- Head coach: Kyle Smith (5th season)
- Associate head coach: Jim Shaw
- Assistant coaches: Jeremy Harden; Wayne Hunter; Derrick Wrobel
- Home arena: Beasley Coliseum

2023–24 Pac-12 Conference men's basketball standings
| | Conf. | | | | Overall |
| Team | W | | L | PCT | W | | L | PCT |
|---|---|---|---|---|---|---|---|---|
| No. 11 Arizona | 15 | – | 5 | .750 | 27 | – | 9 | .750 |
| No. 23 Washington State | 14 | – | 6 | .700 | 25 | – | 10 | .714 |
| Colorado | 13 | – | 7 | .650 | 26 | – | 11 | .703 |
| Oregon † | 12 | – | 8 | .600 | 24 | – | 12 | .667 |
| UCLA | 10 | – | 10 | .500 | 16 | – | 17 | .485 |
| Utah | 9 | – | 11 | .450 | 22 | – | 15 | .595 |
| California | 9 | – | 11 | .450 | 13 | – | 19 | .406 |
| Washington | 9 | – | 11 | .450 | 17 | – | 15 | .531 |
| USC | 8 | – | 12 | .400 | 15 | – | 18 | .455 |
| Stanford | 8 | – | 12 | .400 | 14 | – | 18 | .438 |
| Arizona State | 8 | – | 12 | .400 | 14 | – | 18 | .438 |
| Oregon State | 5 | – | 15 | .250 | 13 | – | 19 | .406 |
† 2024 Pac-12 tournament winner Rankings from AP Poll

The 2023–24 Washington State Cougars men's basketball team represented Washington State University during the 2023–24 NCAA Division I men's basketball season. The team were led by head coach Kyle Smith in his fifth and final season for the Cougars. The Cougars played their home games at the Beasley Coliseum in Pullman, Washington, as members of the Pac-12 Conference. They finished the season 25–10, 14–6 in Pac-12 play to finish in second place. They defeated Stanford in the quarterfinals of the Pac-12 tournament before losing to Colorado in the semifinals. They received an at-large bid to the NCAA tournament as the No. 7 seed in the East region. There, they beat Drake in the first round before losing to Iowa State in the second round.

This was the final season before conference realignment took effect in the Pac-12, as the conference nearly dissolved after the majority of Pac-12 schools left the conference to join other conferences. The team would play in the West Coast Conference as an affiliate member for the next two years before returning to a reconstituted Pac-12.

On February 19, 2024, the Cougars returned to the AP Poll for the first time since the 2007–08 season.

== Previous season ==
The Cougars finished the 2022–23 season 16–15, 11–9 in Pac-12 play to finish in a tie for fifth place. They defeated California in the first round of the Pac-12 tournament before losing to Oregon in the second round. They received an invitation to participate in the NIT, where they were defeated by Eastern Washington in the first round.

== Offseason ==
=== Departures ===
| Name | Number | Pos. | Height | Weight | Year | Hometown | Reason for departure |
|---|---|---|---|---|---|---|---|
| TJ Bamba | 5 | G | 6'5" | 215 | Junior | Bronx, NY | Transferred to Villanova |
| Dishon Jackson | 10 | C | 6'10" | 250 | Junior | Oakland, CA | Transferred to Charlotte |
| DJ Rodman | 11 | F | 6'6" | 215 | Senior | Newport Beach, CA | Graduate transferred to USC |
| Mael Hamon-Crespin | 12 | F | 6'9" | 235 | Freshman | Paris, France | Signed to play professionally in France with Paris Basketball |
| Carlos Rosario | 13 | F | 6'7" | 180 | Junior | Santo Domingo, DR | Transferred to Drake |
| Adrame Diongue | 15 | C | 7'0" | 190 | Freshman | Dakar, Senegal | Transferred to San Jose State |
| Justin Powell | 24 | G | 6'6" | 197 | Junior | Prospect, KY | Declared for 2023 NBA draft/undrafted; signed with Miami Heat |
| Mouhamed Gueye | 35 | F | 6'11" | 210 | Sophomore | Dakar, Senegal | Declared for 2023 NBA draft; selected 39th overall by Atlanta Hawks |

=== Incoming transfers ===
| Name | Num | Pos. | Height | Weight | Year | Hometown | Previous school |
|---|---|---|---|---|---|---|---|
| Jaylen Wells | 0 | F | 6'7" | 200 | Junior | Sacramento, CA | Sonoma State |
| Joseph Yesufu | 11 | G | 6'0" | 180 | GS senior | Bolingbrook, IL | Kansas |
| Isaac Jones | 13 | F/C | 6'9" | 242 | GS senior | Spanaway, WA | Idaho |
| Oscar Cluff | 45 | C | 6'11" | | Sophomore | Sunshine Coast, Australia | Cochise College |

=== 2023 recruiting class ===
College recruiting
| Name | Hometown | School | Height | Weight | Commit date |
|---|---|---|---|---|---|
| Spencer Mahoney #38 SF | Brooklyn, NY | Xaverian High School | 6 ft 8 in (2.03 m) | 185 lb (84 kg) | Jul 12, 2023 |
| Spencer Mahoney #38 SF | Recruit ratings: Rivals: 247Sports: ESPN: (80) | | | | |
| Rueben Chinyelu; C | Senegal, EUR | NBA Academy | 6 ft 11 in (2.11 m) | 245 lb (111 kg) | Nov 14, 2022 |
| Rueben Chinyelu; C | Recruit ratings: No ratings found | | | | |
| Parker Gerrits; SG | Olympia, WA | Olympia High School | 6 ft 2 in (1.88 m) | 180 lb (82 kg) | Sep 4, 2022 |
| Parker Gerrits; SG | Recruit ratings: No ratings found | | | | |
| Isaiah Watts; SG | South Kent, CT | South Kent School | 6 ft 2 in (1.88 m) | 180 lb (82 kg) | May 12, 2022 |
| Isaiah Watts; SG | Recruit ratings: No ratings found | | | | |
Overall recruit ranking:
Note: In many cases, Scout, Rivals, 247Sports, On3, and ESPN may conflict in their listings of height and weight.; In these cases, the average was taken. ESPN grades are on a 100-point scale.; Sources: "2023 Washington State Commits". Rivals.; "Men's Basketball Recruiting". Scout.; "ESPN- Washington State Cougars Men's Basketball Recruiting". ESPN.; "Scout.com Team Recruiting Rankings". Scout.; "2023 Team Ranking". Rivals.

=== 2024 recruiting class ===
College recruiting (2024)
| Name | Hometown | School | Height | Weight | Commit date |
|---|---|---|---|---|---|
| Adam Njie #55 PG | Bronx, NY | Cardinal Hayes High School | 6 ft 1 in (1.85 m) | 175 lb (79 kg) | May 6, 2023 |
| Adam Njie #55 PG | Recruit ratings: Rivals: 247Sports: ESPN: (79) | | | | |
| Marcus Wilson; SG | Scottsdale, AZ | Bella Vista Prep | 6 ft 2 in (1.88 m) | 170 lb (77 kg) | May 16, 2023 |
| Marcus Wilson; SG | Recruit ratings: No ratings found | | | | |
Overall recruit ranking:
Note: In many cases, Scout, Rivals, 247Sports, On3, and ESPN may conflict in their listings of height and weight.; In these cases, the average was taken. ESPN grades are on a 100-point scale.; Sources: "2024 Washington State Commits". Rivals.; "Men's Basketball Recruiting". Scout.; "ESPN- Washington State Cougars Men's Basketball Recruiting". ESPN.; "Scout.com Team Recruiting Rankings". Scout.; "2024 Team Ranking". Rivals.

== Roster ==
2023–24 Washington State Cougars men's basketball team
Players
Coaches

| Pos. | # | Name | Height | Weight | Year | Previous school | Hometown |
|---|---|---|---|---|---|---|---|
| F | 0 | Jaylen Wells | 6 ft 8 in (2.03 m) | 205 lb (93 kg) | Jr | Sonoma State | Sacramento, CA |
| G | 2 | Myles Rice | 6 ft 3 in (1.91 m) | 180 lb (82 kg) | RS Fr | Sandy Creek HS | Columbia, SC |
| G | 3 | Jabe Mullins | 6 ft 6 in (1.98 m) | 200 lb (91 kg) | Sr | Saint Mary's | Snoqualmie, WA |
| G | 4 | Shae Korpela (W) | 6 ft 7 in (2.01 m) | 195 lb (88 kg) | RS Fr | Aspen HS | Aspen, CO |
| G | 5 | Ben Olesen (W) | 6 ft 0 in (1.83 m) | 160 lb (73 kg) | RS Sr | Jackson HS | Mill Creek, WA |
| G | 10 | Parker Gerrits | 6 ft 1 in (1.85 m) | 190 lb (86 kg) | Fr | Olympia HS | Olympia, WA |
| G | 11 | Joseph Yesufu (injured) | 6 ft 0 in (1.83 m) | 185 lb (84 kg) | Sr | Kansas | Bolingbrook, IL |
| G | 12 | Isaiah Watts | 6 ft 3 in (1.91 m) | 170 lb (77 kg) | Fr | South Kent (CT) | West Seattle, WA |
| C | 13 | Isaac Jones | 6 ft 9 in (2.06 m) | 245 lb (111 kg) | RS Sr | Idaho | Spanaway, WA |
| G | 14 | Braden Korpela (W) | 6 ft 7 in (2.01 m) | 170 lb (77 kg) | RS Fr | Aspen HS | Aspen, CO |
| F | 15 | AJ Rohosy (W) | 6 ft 9 in (2.06 m) | 215 lb (98 kg) | RS So | Martin Catholic HS | San Anselmo, CA |
| C | 20 | Rueben Chinyelu | 6 ft 11 in (2.11 m) | 245 lb (111 kg) | Fr | NBA Academy Africa | Enugu Agidi, Nigeria |
| G | 22 | Dylan Darling | 6 ft 2 in (1.88 m) | 180 lb (82 kg) | So | Central Valley HS | Spokane, WA |
| F | 23 | Andrej Jakimovski | 6 ft 8 in (2.03 m) | 220 lb (100 kg) | Sr | Reale Mutua Torino | Skopje, Macedonia |
| G | 31 | Kymany Houinsou | 6 ft 6 in (1.98 m) | 205 lb (93 kg) | So | Asvel | Mulhouse, France |
| F | 34 | AJ LaBeau (W) | 6 ft 10 in (2.08 m) | 230 lb (104 kg) | Fr | Timberline HS | Boise, ID |
| F | 45 | Oscar Cluff | 6 ft 11 in (2.11 m) | 255 lb (116 kg) | Jr | Cochise College | Sunshine Coast, Australia |

Head coach

- Kyle Smith (Hamilton)

Assistant coach(es)

- Jim Shaw (Western Oregon)
- John Andrejek (Columbia)
- Wayne Hunter (Saint Mary's)

Legend

- (C) Team captain
- (S) Suspended
- (I) Ineligible
- (W) Walk-on
- Injured
- Current redshirt

Roster

== Schedule and results ==
| Date time, TV | Rank^{#} | Opponent^{#} | Result | Record | High points | High rebounds | High assists | Site (attendance) city, state |
Non-conference regular season
| November 6, 2023*; 8:00 p.m., P12N | | Idaho; Battle of the Palouse | W 84–59 | 1–0 | 21 – Jakimovski | 9 – Jones | 4 – Jones | Beasley Coliseum (2,323); Pullman, WA |
| November 10, 2023*; 7:00 p.m., P12N | | Prairie View A&M; Pac-12/SWAC Legacy Series | W 83–65 | 2–0 | 18 – Jones | 11 – Jones | 5 – Rice | Beasley Coliseum (2,282); Pullman, WA |
| November 18, 2023*; 9:00 a.m., ESPN+ | | vs. Mississippi State; Hall of Fame Tip-Off semifinals | L 64–76 | 2–1 | 21 – Rice | 7 – Jakimovski | 5 – Yesufu | Mohegan Sun Arena (–); Uncasville, CT |
| November 19, 2023*; 12:30 p.m., ESPNU | | vs. Rhode Island; Hall of Fame Tip-Off 3rd place game | W 78–57 | 3–1 | 21 – Jones | 7 – Wells | 5 – Jones | Mohegan Sun Arena (3,024); Uncasville, CT |
| November 24, 2023*; 1:00 p.m., P12N | | Utah Tech | W 93–53 | 4–1 | 20 – Jakimovski | 10 – Chinyelu | 5 – Houinsou | Beasley Coliseum (2,736); Pullman, WA |
| November 27, 2023*; 7:00 p.m., P12N | | Eastern Washington | W 82–72 | 5–1 | 28 – Rice | 7 – Tied | 2 – Tied | Beasley Coliseum (2,208); Pullman, WA |
| December 2, 2023*; 2:00 p.m., P12N | | Portland State | W 71–61 | 6–1 | 27 – Jones | 11 – Jones | 2 – Rice | Beasley Coliseum (2,257); Pullman, WA |
| December 6, 2023*; 7:00 p.m., P12N | | UC Riverside | W 86–49 | 7–1 | 18 – Wells | 10 – Wells | 5 – Houinsou | Beasley Coliseum (2,057); Pullman, WA |
| December 10, 2023*; 5:00 p.m., P12N | | Grambling State | W 83–65 | 8–1 | 17 – Wells | 7 – Jones | 7 – Rice | Beasley Coliseum (2,158); Pullman, WA |
| December 16, 2023*; 11:00 a.m., P12N | | vs. Santa Clara; Jerry Colangelo Classic | L 61–69 | 8–2 | 16 – Jones | 13 – Chinyelu | 2 – Houinsou | Footprint Center (–); Phoenix, AZ |
| December 21, 2023*; 8:00 p.m., P12N | | vs. Boise State; Numerica Holiday Hoops | W 66–61 | 9–2 | 21 – Jones | 13 – Jakimovski | 3 – Rice | Spokane Arena (5,146); Spokane, WA |
Pac-12 regular season
| December 29, 2023; 5:30 p.m., P12N | | at Utah | L 58–80 | 9–3 (0–1) | 12 – Jones | 10 – Tied | 5 – Houinsou | Jon M. Huntsman Center (8,235); Salt Lake City, UT |
| December 31, 2023; 11:00 a.m., P12N | | at Colorado | L 67–74 | 9–4 (0–2) | 19 – Jakimovski | 8 – Jones | 4 – Houinsou | CU Events Center (6,952); Boulder, CO |
| January 4, 2024; 8:00 p.m., P12N | | Oregon State | W 65–58 | 10–4 (1–2) | 20 – Cluff | 8 – Cluff | 4 – Tied | Beasley Coliseum (2,524); Pullman, WA |
| January 6, 2024; 7:00 p.m., ESPNU | | Oregon | L 84–89 | 10–5 (1–3) | 22 – Rice | 6 – Wells | 7 – Rice | Beasley Coliseum (2,892); Pullman, WA |
| January 10, 2024; 7:30 p.m., FS1 | | at USC | W 72–64 | 11–5 (2–3) | 26 – Jones | 11 – Jones | 5 – Rice | Galen Center (6,218); Los Angeles, CA |
| January 13, 2024; 3:00 p.m., P12N | | No. 8 Arizona | W 73–70 | 12–5 (3–3) | 24 – Jones | 13 – Jones | 5 – Rice | Beasley Coliseum (3,564); Pullman, WA |
| January 18, 2024; 8:00 p.m., P12N | | at Stanford | W 89–75 | 13–5 (4–3) | 35 – Rice | 14 – Cluff | 8 – Rice | Maples Pavilion (2,855); Stanford, CA |
| January 20, 2024; 2:00 p.m., P12N | | at California | L 75–81 ^{OT} | 13–6 (4–4) | 20 – Jakimovski | 8 – Chinyelu | 3 – Tied | Haas Pavilion (3,201); Berkeley, CA |
| January 24, 2024; 7:00 p.m., P12N | | Utah | W 79–57 | 14–6 (5–4) | 17 – Jones | 10 – Jones | 6 – Rice | Beasley Coliseum (2,605); Pullman, WA |
| January 27, 2024; 2:00 p.m., P12N | | Colorado | W 78–69 | 15–6 (6–4) | 17 – Tied | 11 – Jones | 4 – Jakimovski | Beasley Coliseum (3,273); Pullman, WA |
| February 3, 2024; 6:00 p.m., P12N | | at Washington; Rivalry | W 90–87 ^{OT} | 16–6 (7–4) | 22 – Jones | 7 – Jones | 5 – Rice | Alaska Airlines Arena (9,294); Seattle, WA |
| February 8, 2024; 7:00 p.m., P12N | | at Oregon State | W 64–58 | 17–6 (8–4) | 24 – Wells | 7 – Tied | 6 – Rice | Gill Coliseum (3,562); Corvallis, OR |
| February 10, 2024; 2:00 p.m., P12N | | at Oregon | W 62–56 | 18–6 (9–4) | 21 – Rice | 9 – Rice | 3 – Rice | Matthew Knight Arena (7,617); Eugene, OR |
| February 15, 2024; 7:00 p.m., P12N | | California | W 84–65 | 19–6 (10–4) | 25 – Rice | 9 – Jones | 4 – Houinsou | Beasley Coliseum (2,744); Pullman, WA |
| February 17, 2024; 3:00 p.m., P12N | | Stanford | W 72–59 | 20–6 (11–4) | 14 – Tied | 12 – Cluff | 5 – Rice | Beasley Coliseum (5,671); Pullman, WA |
| February 22, 2024; 8:00 p.m., FS1 | No. 21 | at No. 4 Arizona | W 77–74 | 21–6 (12–4) | 27 – Wells | 11 – Chinyelu | 4 – Jakimovski | McKale Center (14,688); Tucson, AZ |
| February 24, 2024; 5:00 p.m., ESPN2 | No. 21 | at Arizona State | L 61–73 | 21–7 (12–5) | 16 – Jones | 11 – Jones | 3 – Tied | Desert Financial Arena (9,586); Tempe, AZ |
| February 29, 2024; 7:30 p.m., P12N | No. 19 | USC | W 75–72 | 22–7 (13–5) | 11 – Watts | 5 – Tied | 8 – Rice | Beasley Coliseum (8,288); Pullman, WA |
| March 2, 2024; 4:00 p.m., P12N | No. 19 | UCLA | W 77–65 | 23–7 (14–5) | 27 – Wells | 10 – Jakimovski | 4 – Rice | Beasley Coliseum (8,096); Pullman, WA |
| March 7, 2024; 6:00 p.m., FS1 | No. 18 | Washington; Rivalry/Senior Night | L 68–74 | 23–8 (14–6) | 20 – Jones | 10 – Jones | 6 – Rice | Beasley Coliseum (9,311); Pullman, WA |
Pac-12 Tournament
| March 14, 2024; 6:00 p.m., P12N | (2) No. 22 | vs. (10) Stanford; Quarterfinals | W 79–62 | 24–8 | 16 – Jones | 6 – Tied | 6 – Rice | T-Mobile Arena (11,428); Paradise, NV |
| March 15, 2024; 7:30 p.m., FS1 | (2) No. 22 | vs. (3) Colorado; Semifinals | L 52–58 | 24–9 | 13 – Jones | 7 – Wells | 4 – Wells | T-Mobile Arena (17,502); Paradise, NV |
NCAA tournament
| March 21, 2024*; 7:05 p.m., TruTV | (7 E) No. 25 | vs. (10 E) Drake; First Round | W 66–61 | 25–9 | 20 – Jones | 11 – Jones | 3 – Tied | CHI Health Center (17,391); Omaha, NE |
| March 23, 2024*; 3:10 p.m., TNT | (7 E) No. 25 | vs. (2 E) No. 4 Iowa State; Second Round | L 56–67 | 25–10 | 20 – Wells | 9 – Jones | 2 – Tied | CHI Health Center; Omaha, NE |
*Non-conference game. ^{#}Rankings from AP Poll. (#) Tournament seedings in parentheses. E=East. All times are in Pacific Time.

== Rankings ==
Ranking movements Legend: ██ Increase in ranking ██ Decrease in ranking — = Not ranked RV = Received votes
| | Week | | | | | | | | | | | | | | | | | | | | |
| Poll | Pre | 1 | 2 | 3 | 4 | 5 | 6 | 7 | 8 | 9 | 10 | 11 | 12 | 13 | 14 | 15 | 16 | 17 | 18 | 19 | Final |
|---|---|---|---|---|---|---|---|---|---|---|---|---|---|---|---|---|---|---|---|---|---|
| AP | — | — | — | — | — | — | — | — | — | — | — | — | — | RV | RV | 21 | 19 | 18 | 22 | 25 | 23 |
| Coaches | — | — | — | — | — | — | — | — | — | — | — | — | — | — | RV | 22 | 21 | 20 | 25 | RV | 24 |
