= Cody Williams =

American basketball player (born 2004)

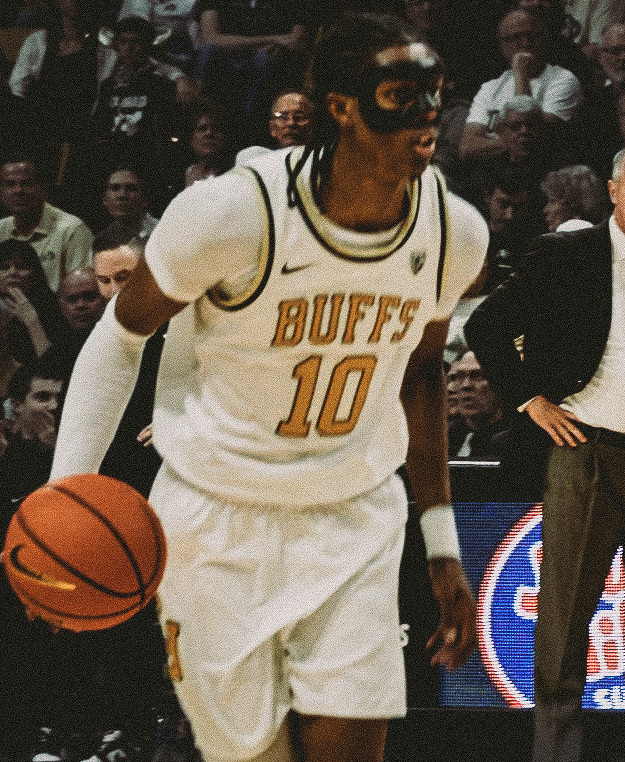
- Williams with Colorado in 2024

No. 9 – Minnesota Timberwolves
- Position: Small forward
- League: NBA

Personal information
- Born: November 20, 2004 (age 21) San Luis Obispo, California, U.S.
- Listed height: 6 ft 7 in (2.01 m)
- Listed weight: 190 lb (86 kg)

Career information
- High school: Perry (Gilbert, Arizona)
- College: Colorado (2023–2024)
- NBA draft: 2024: 1st round, 10th overall pick
- Drafted by: Utah Jazz
- Playing career: 2024–present

Career history
- 2024–2026: Utah Jazz
- 2024–2025: →Salt Lake City Stars
- 2026–present: Minnesota Timberwolves

Career highlights
- Pac-12 All-Freshman Team (2024); McDonald's All-American (2023); Jordan Brand Classic (2023); Nike Hoop Summit (2023)
- Stats at NBA.com
- Stats at Basketball Reference

Cody Leron Williams (born November 20, 2004) is an American professional basketball player for the Minnesota Timberwolves of the National Basketball Association (NBA). He played college basketball for the Colorado Buffaloes. He was a consensus five-star recruit and one of the top players in the 2023 class. He is the younger brother of Oklahoma City Thunder player Jalen Williams.

== Early life ==
Williams was born in San Luis Obispo, California but grew up in Gilbert, Arizona after his family moved there when he was young. He attended Perry High School. As a junior, Williams was named the Premier Region Player of the Year after averaging 13 points, 4 rebounds, 3 assists, and 2 steals per game as Perry won the Class 6A state championship. Williams averaged 18.4 points, 6.7 rebounds, and 4 assists per game as a senior while leading the Pumas to a 30–1 record and a second consecutive state championship. Williams was selected to play in the 2023 McDonald's All-American Boys Game during his senior year. He was also selected to play for Team USA in the Nike Hoops Summit.

Williams was a consensus five-star recruit and one of the top players in the 2023 class, according to major recruiting services. On November 9, 2022, Williams committed to playing college basketball for Colorado after considering offers from LSU, Arizona, UCLA, and USC. He became the highest-ranked committed recruit in program history and the first five-star recruit to join Colorado.

College recruiting
Name	Hometown	School	Height	Weight	Commit date
Cody Williams; SF	Gilbert, AZ	Perry (AZ)	6 ft 8 in (2.03 m)	180 lb (82 kg)	Nov 9, 2022
Cody Williams; SF	Recruit ratings: Rivals: 247Sports: ESPN: (93)				
Overall recruit ranking: Rivals: 7 247Sports: 4 ESPN: 7
Note: In many cases, Scout, Rivals, 247Sports, On3, and ESPN may conflict in their listings of height and weight.; In these cases, the average was taken. ESPN grades are on a 100-point scale.; Sources: "Colorado 2023 Basketball Commitments". Rivals.; "2023 Colorado Buffaloes Recruiting Class". ESPN.; "2023 Team Ranking". Rivals.

== College career ==
As a freshman, Williams averaged 11.9 points and 3.0 rebounds per game, helping the Buffaloes earn a berth in the NCAA Tournament. He was named to the Pac-12 All-Freshman Team. Following the season Williams declared for the 2024 NBA draft.

== Professional career ==
On June 26, 2024, Williams was selected with the tenth overall pick by the Utah Jazz in the 2024 NBA Draft and on July 2, he signed with them. Throughout his rookie season, he was assigned several times to the Salt Lake City Stars. In his rookie season, Williams averaged 4.6 points, 2.3 rebounds, and 1.2 assists.

Entering the 2025−26 season, Williams began to see an increase in minutes, and in his increased role, he began to see some signs of improvement. In the 2025−26 season, Williams also saw his first-ever start, where in the games against the Dallas Mavericks, he scored eight points, tallied four rebounds, and dished out two steals in 22 minutes of gameplay. On Saturday, January 10, 2026, in a demoralizing blow against the Charlotte Hornets, Williams finished the game with a −60, making it the worst +/− record in NBA history, beating both Scoot Henderson's and Jeremiah Robinson-Earl's record of −58. On March 15, Williams recorded a career-high 34 points with seven rebounds in a 111–113 loss to the Sacramento Kings.

On August 29, 2026, Williams and John Konchar were traded to the Minnesota Timberwolves in exchange for Josh Green, and cash considerations.

== National team career ==
Williams was named to the United States under-19 basketball team, which was coached by Colorado head coach Tad Boyle, to play in the 2023 FIBA Under-19 Basketball World Cup.

== Career statistics ==
Legend
GP	Games played	GS	Games started	MPG	Minutes per game
FG%	Field goal percentage	3P%	3-point field goal percentage	FT%	Free throw percentage
RPG	Rebounds per game	APG	Assists per game	SPG	Steals per game
BPG	Blocks per game	PPG	Points per game	**Bold**	Career high

=== NBA ===
Year	Team	GP	GS	MPG	FG%	3P%	FT%	RPG	APG	SPG	BPG	PPG
2024–25	Utah	50	21	21.2	.323	**.259**	**.725**	2.3	1.2	.5	.3	4.6
2025–26	Utah	**67**	**41**	**24.3**	**.468**	.214	.706	**3.0**	**2.0**	**.8**	**.4**	**8.8**
Career		117	62	23.0	.419	.237	.711	2.7	1.7	.6	.4	7.0

=== College ===
Year	Team	GP	GS	MPG	FG%	3P%	FT%	RPG	APG	SPG	BPG	PPG
2023–24	Colorado	24	18	28.4	.552	.415	.714	3.0	1.6	.6	.7	11.9

== Personal life ==
Williams is the son of Ron and Nicole Williams. He has two older siblings, Jasmine and Jalen. Williams' older brother, Jalen Williams, currently plays for the Oklahoma City Thunder in the National Basketball Association.
