= Andrej Jakimovski =

Macedonian basketball player

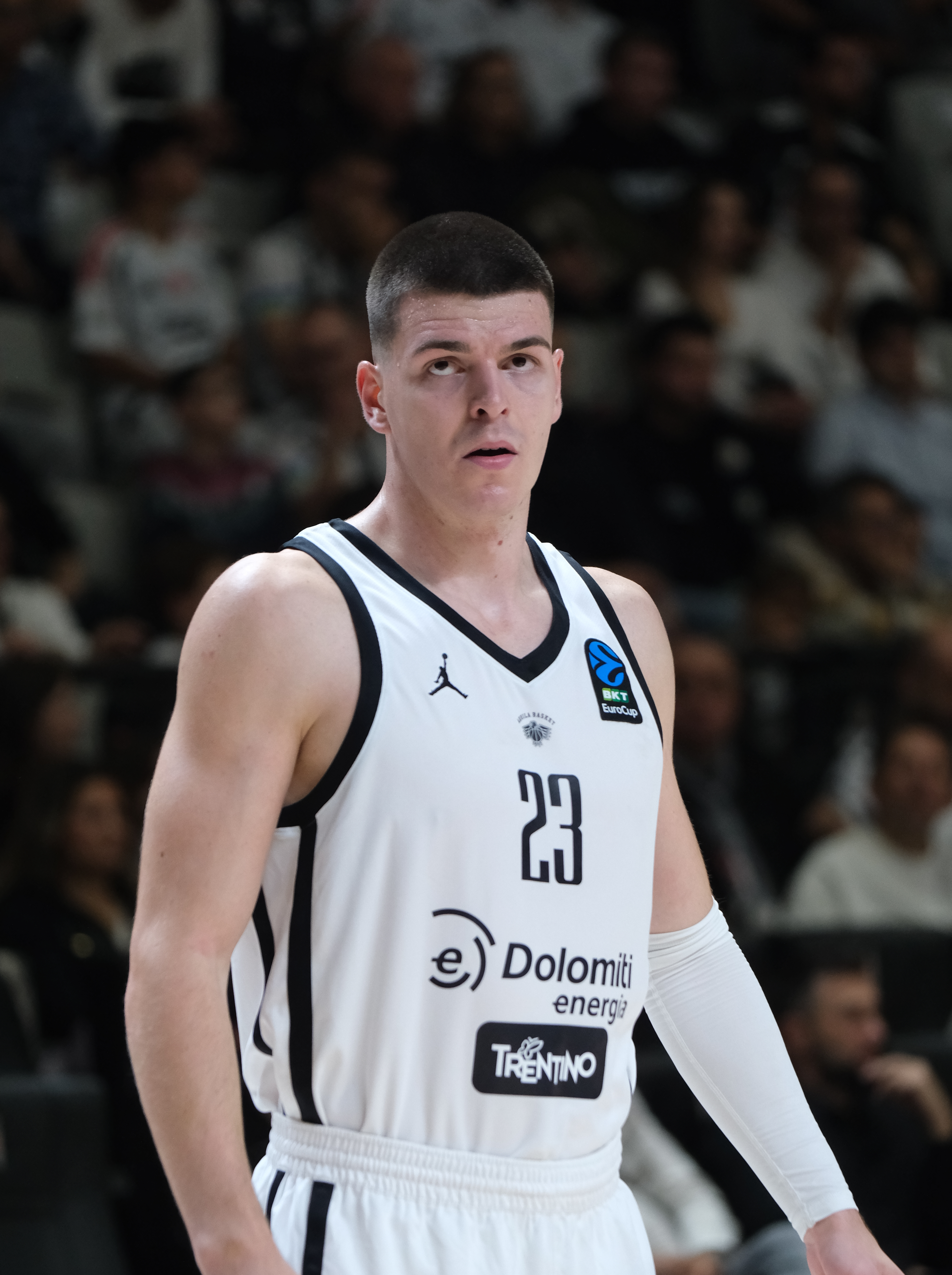
- Jakimovski with Aquila Trento in 2025

No. 23 – Napoli Basket
- Position: Small forward
- League: LBA; EuroCup

Personal information
- Born: 18 March 2001 (age 25) Kriva Palanka, Macedonia
- Listed height: 2.02 m (6 ft 8 in)
- Listed weight: 97.5 kg (215 lb)

Career information
- College: Washington State (2020–2024); Colorado (2024–2025)
- NBA draft: 2025: undrafted
- Playing career: 2019–present

Career history
- 2019–2020: Torino
- 2025–2026: Aquila Trento
- 2026–present: Napoli Basket

Andrej Jakimovski (Macedonian: Андреј Јакимовски; born 18 March 2001) is a Macedonian professional basketball player for Napoli Basket of the Italian Lega Basket Serie A (LBA) and the EuroCup. He previously played for the Washington State Cougars and the Colorado Buffaloes. Listed at 6 feet 8 inches (2.0 m) and 215 pounds (98 kg), he plays the small forward position.

== Early career ==
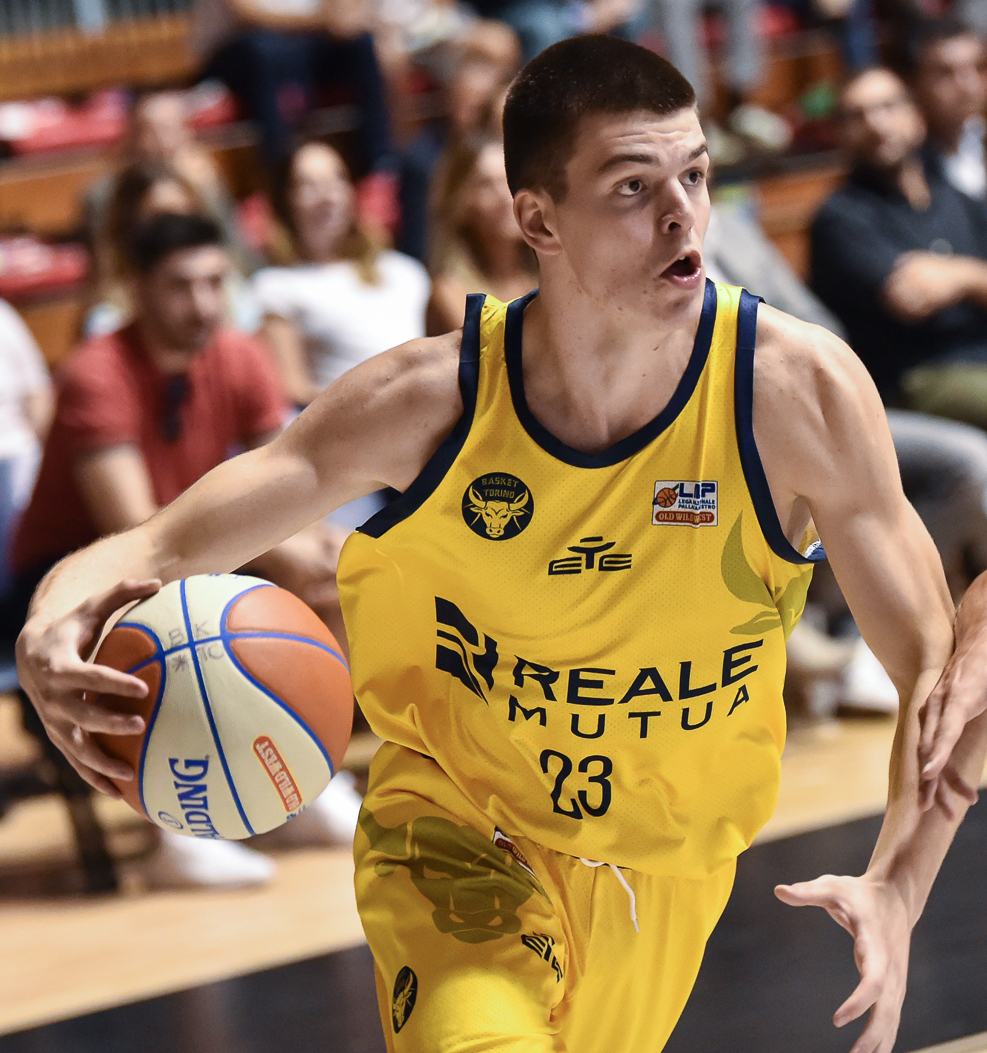
Jakimovski with Torino in 2019

Jakimovski played for Basket Torino of the Italian Serie A2 Basket during the 2019–20 season. He saw little playing time for Torino. In the Italian NextGen Under-19 competition, he averaged 28 points, 14 rebounds, 4.3 assists and 3 steals per game.

On 21 June 2020, Jakimovski committed to playing college basketball for the Washington State Cougars. He had several offers from European professional teams but decided to come to America to play collegiately. According to Washington State coach Kyle Smith, the Cougars had been recruiting him for over a year. Jakimovski was also recruited by Utah, Georgia Tech, Boston College, Minnesota, Utah State and Davidson. He was regarded as a four-star prospect by 247Sports and is Washington State's fourth-highest rated recruit after Klay Thompson, Mouhamed Gueye, and Michael Harthun.

== College career ==
As a freshman, Jakimovski averaged 5.5 points, 4.1 rebounds, and 1.8 assists per game. After the season, he announced he was entering the transfer portal. Jakimovski initially committed to Loyola (Maryland), but ultimately opted to return to Washington State. As a sophomore, he averaged 5.4 points, 3.9 rebounds and 0.8 assists per game. Jakimovski averaged 7.7 points and 4.6 rebounds per game as a junior.

Jakimovski averaged 9.7 points and 5.6 rebounds per game as a senior, helping Washington State reach its first NCAA tournament in 16 years. He entered the transfer portal at the end of the 2023–23 season, and committed to Colorado on 21 April 2024. In 34 games, Jakimovski recorded 10.2 points, 5.1 rebounds, 1.3 assists and 1.0 steal per game.

== Professional career ==
=== Aquila Trento (2025–2026) ===
On July 4, 2025, he signed a 2 year contract with Dolomiti Energia Trento of the Italian Lega Basket Serie A (LBA).

=== Napoli Basket (2026–present) ===
On June 25, 2026, Jakimovski signed a two-year contract with Napoli Basket of the Lega Basket Serie A (LBA).

== National team career ==
Jakimovski made three appearances for the Macedonian junior national teams at the FIBA U16 and U18 European Championships. He led the FIBA U18 European Championship B in scoring with 18.4 points per game to go with 9.4 rebounds per game, leading the team to a fourth-place finish. In February 2020, Jakimovski made his debut for the senior national team during the FIBA European qualifying tournament.

== Career statistics ==
Legend
GP	Games played	GS	Games started	MPG	Minutes per game
FG%	Field goal percentage	3P%	3-point field goal percentage	FT%	Free throw percentage
RPG	Rebounds per game	APG	Assists per game	SPG	Steals per game
BPG	Blocks per game	PPG	Points per game	**Bold**	Career high

=== College ===
Year	Team	GP	GS	MPG	FG%	3P%	FT%	RPG	APG	SPG	BPG	PPG
2020–21	Washington State	25	19	25.2	.313	.320	.600	4.1	1.8	.3	.2	5.5
2021–22	Washington State	37	5	18.9	.386	.383	.719	3.9	0.8	.5	.1	5.4
2022–23	Washington State	23	21	26.7	.361	.345	.615	4.6	1.1	.7	.3	7.7
2023–24	Washington State	35	35	33.6	.361	.332	.600	5.6	1.3	.6	.4	9.7
