= KJ Simpson =

American basketball player (born 2002)

- Simpson with Galatasaray in 2026

No. 25 – Galatasaray
- Position: Point guard
- League: BSL; BCL

Personal information
- Born: August 8, 2002 (age 24) Los Angeles, California, U.S.
- Listed height: 6 ft 2 in (1.88 m)
- Listed weight: 189 lb (86 kg)

Career information
- High school: Chaminade College Prep (Los Angeles, California)
- College: Colorado (2021–2024)
- NBA draft: 2024: 2nd round, 42nd overall pick
- Drafted by: Charlotte Hornets
- Playing career: 2024–present

Career history
- 2024–2026: Charlotte Hornets
- 2024–2026: →Greensboro Swarm
- 2026: Denver Nuggets
- 2026: →Grand Rapids Gold
- 2026–present: Galatasaray

Career highlights
- First-team All-Pac-12 (2024); Second-team All-Pac-12 (2023); Pac-12 All-Freshman Team (2022)
- Stats at NBA.com
- Stats at Basketball Reference

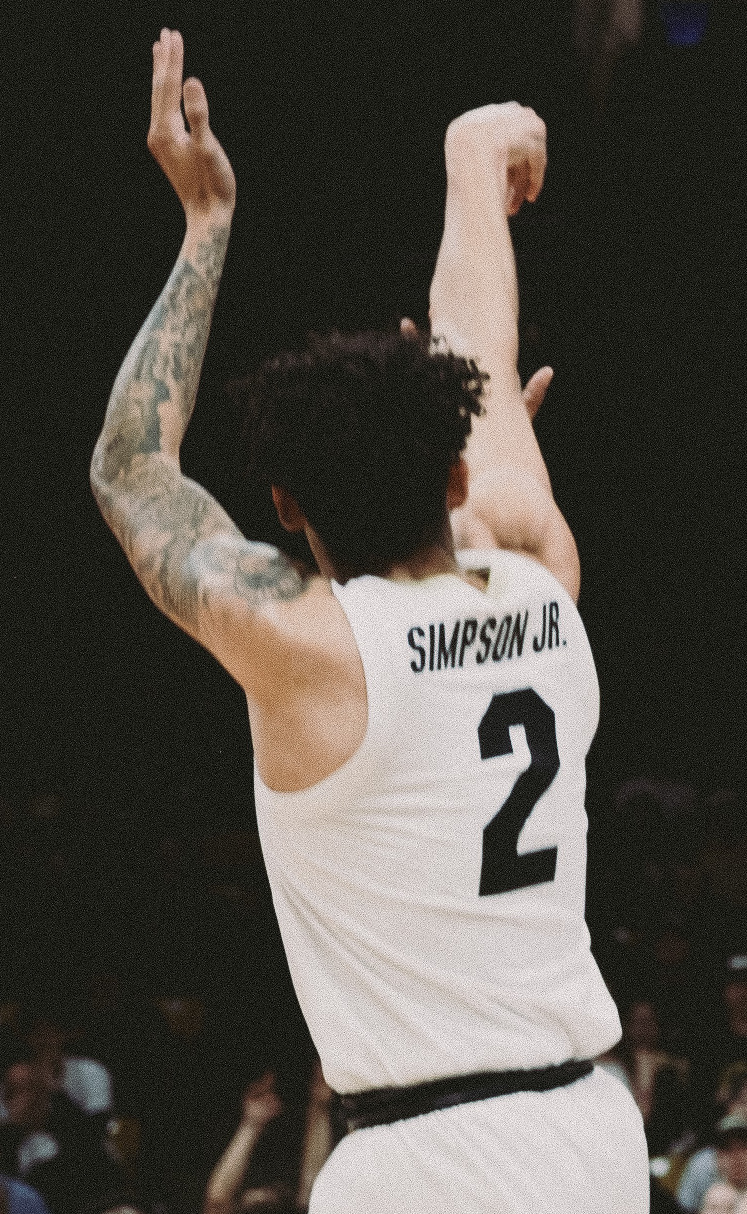
Simpson with Colorado in 2024

Kenneth Dwayne "KJ" Simpson Jr. (born August 8, 2002) is an American professional basketball player for Galatasaray of the Basketbol Süper Ligi (BSL) and the Basketball Champions League (BCL). He played college basketball for the Colorado Buffaloes.

== Early life and high school career ==
Simpson grew up in Panorama City, Los Angeles and attended Chaminade College Preparatory School. He was rated a four-star recruit and initially committed to playing college basketball for Arizona. After Arizona head coach Sean Miller was fired, Simpson requested and was granted a release from his National Letter of Intent and reopened his recruitment. He ultimately signed to play at Colorado.

== College career ==
Simpson was named to the Pac-12 Conference All-Freshman team during his first season playing for the Colorado Buffaloes after averaging 7.4 points per game and also leading the team in total assists and steals. He was named second-team All-Pac-12 after averaging 15.9 points, 4.3 rebounds, 3.8 assists and 1.5 steals per game as a sophomore.

As a junior, Simpson was named to the first-team All-Pac-12, averaging a team-high 19.7 points per game and shooting 43% from three-point range this season. In the first round of the 2024 NCAA tournament against No. 7 Florida, Simpson hit a game-winning jumper with less than two seconds left to secure a 102–100 victory.

== Professional career ==
=== Charlotte Hornets (2024–2026) ===
On June 27, 2024, Simpson was selected with the 42nd overall pick by the Charlotte Hornets in the 2024 NBA draft. On July 7, Simpson signed a two-way contract with the Hornets. He made 36 appearances (including 15 starts) for Charlotte during his rookie campaign, recording averages of 7.8 points, 3.0 rebounds, and 3.1 assists.

Simpson made 14 appearances (including two starts) for the Hornets during the 2025–26 NBA season, averaging 6.0 points, 2.1 rebounds, and 2.5 assists. On February 6, 2026, he was waived by the Hornets.

=== Denver Nuggets (2026) ===
On February 19, 2026, Simpson signed a two-way contract with the Denver Nuggets. On September 30, 2026, Simpson was waived by the Nuggets to make room for Ryan Nembhard.

=== Galatasaray (2026–present) ===
On October 14, 2026, Simpson signed with Galatasaray of the Turkish Basketbol Süper Ligi (BSL) and the Basketball Champions League (BCL). On October 23rd, he was named the BCL Player of the Week. He had 17 points, 8 rebounds, and 3 assists in 26 minutes of action.

== Career statistics ==
Legend
GP	Games played	GS	Games started	MPG	Minutes per game
FG%	Field goal percentage	3P%	3-point field goal percentage	FT%	Free throw percentage
RPG	Rebounds per game	APG	Assists per game	SPG	Steals per game
BPG	Blocks per game	PPG	Points per game	**Bold**	Career high

=== NBA ===
Year	Team	GP	GS	MPG	FG%	3P%	FT%	RPG	APG	SPG	BPG	PPG
2024–25	Charlotte	**36**	**15**	**23.4**	.346	.254	**.820**	**3.0**	**3.1**	.9	**.2**	**7.8**
2025–26	Charlotte	14	2	15.9	**.348**	**.308**	.625	2.1	2.5	**1.1**	.0	6.0
2025–26	Denver	6	0	5.7	.300	.000	.500	1.3	1.3	.2	.0	1.2
Career		56	17	19.6	.345	.265	.820	2.6	2.8	.9	.1	6.7

=== College ===
Year	Team	GP	GS	MPG	FG%	3P%	FT%	RPG	APG	SPG	BPG	PPG
2021–22	Colorado	32	1	21.3	.377	.254	.770	2.5	2.7	.8	.1	7.4
2022–23	Colorado	29	28	31.8	.396	.276	.817	4.3	3.8	1.5	**.2**	15.9
2023–24	Colorado	**37**	**37**	**35.1**	**.475**	**.434**	**.876**	**5.8**	**4.9**	**1.6**	.1	**19.7**
Career		98	66	29.6	.429	.347	.834	4.3	3.9	1.3	.1	14.6
