= J'Vonne Hadley =

American basketball player (born 2002)

No. 14 – Sioux Falls Skyforce
- Position: Small forward
- League: NBA G League

Personal information
- Born: April 3, 2002 (age 24)
- Listed height: 6 ft 6 in (1.98 m)
- Listed weight: 210 lb (95 kg)

Career information
- High school: Cretin-Derham Hall (Saint Paul, Minnesota)
- College: Northeastern (2020–2021); Indian Hills CC (2021–2022); Colorado (2022–2024); Louisville (2024–2026)
- NBA draft: 2026: undrafted
- Playing career: 2026–present

Career history
- 2026–present: Sioux Falls Skyforce
- Stats at NBA.com
- Stats at Basketball Reference

J'Vonne Le'Roy Hadley (born April 3, 2002) is an American professional basketball player for the Sioux Falls Skyforce of the NBA G League. He played college basketball for the Louisville Cardinals, Colorado Buffaloes, Indian Hills Warriors and Northeastern Huskies.

== High school career ==
Hadley grew up in Saint Paul, Minnesota and was raised by his mother Kim Campbell after his father abandoned the family. He attended Cretin-Derham Hall High School. As a senior, he averaged 19.1 points per game before the season was cancelled due to the COVID-19 pandemic. Hadley committed to play college basketball at Northeastern.

== College career ==
After playing sparingly as a freshman at Northeastern, Hadley transferred to Indian Hills Community College. He was named NJCAA First-Team All-American, averaging 10.9 points and a team-best 6.2 rebounds per game and transferred to Colorado after the season. In his first season for the Buffaloes, Hadley averaged 8.0 points and 5.9 rebounds per game. As a senior, he posted 11.6 points, 6.0 rebounds, 2.4 assists and 1.2 steals per game. Hadley transferred again to Louisville. He averaged 12.2 points, 7.3 rebounds, and 1.8 rebounds per game in his first season for Louisville. In his final season, Hadley averaged 11.5 points, 5.1 rebounds and 1.8 assists per game.

== Professional career ==
On August 27, 2026, the Miami Heat signed Hadley to an Exhibit 10 deal. He was named to the opening night roster of the Sioux Falls Skyforce.
