= Gabilan =

Gabilan may refer to:

- Gabilan, an eagle ray found in the Gulf of California
- Gabilan, California, a former settlement in Monterey County, California
- Gabilan Range, mountains in California
- Gabilan Mountains slender salamander (Batrachoseps gavilanensis), a species of salamander
- USS Gabilan (SS-252), a United States Navy Gato-class submarine

== See also ==
- Gabilan Acres, California, an unincorporated community in Monterey County, California
