= Alisal =

Alisal is a Spanish word for "alder grove". It may refer to:

== People ==
- Carlos Casado del Alisal (1833–1899), Spanish Argentine businessman
- José Casado del Alisal (1830/32–1886), Spanish portrait and history painter

== Places ==
- Alisal, Salinas, California, a former unincorporated community, now part of Salinas
- Alisal, Pleasanton, California former Californio settlement, now part of Pleasanton, California

== Other uses ==
- Alisal High School, Salinas, California
- Rancho El Alisal, a Mexican land grant in present-day Monterey County, California
- El Alisal, alternate name of the Lummis House in Los Angeles
- Alisal Creek, a tributary of the Santa Ynez River in Santa Barbara County, California
