= 2023–24 Stanford Cardinal men's basketball team =

College basketball team season

2023–24 Stanford Cardinal men's basketball
- Conference: Pac-12 Conference
- Record: 14–18 (8–12 Pac-12)
- Head coach: Jerod Haase (8th season)
- Assistant coaches: Jesse Pruitt; Robert Ehsan; Brandon Dunson
- Home arena: Maples Pavilion

2023–24 Pac-12 Conference men's basketball standings
	Conf.				Overall
Team	W		L	PCT	W		L	PCT
No. 11 Arizona	15	–	5	.750	27	–	9	.750
No. 23 Washington State	14	–	6	.700	25	–	10	.714
Colorado	13	–	7	.650	26	–	11	.703
Oregon †	12	–	8	.600	24	–	12	.667
UCLA	10	–	10	.500	16	–	17	.485
Utah	9	–	11	.450	22	–	15	.595
California	9	–	11	.450	13	–	19	.406
Washington	9	–	11	.450	17	–	15	.531
USC	8	–	12	.400	15	–	18	.455
Stanford	8	–	12	.400	14	–	18	.438
Arizona State	8	–	12	.400	14	–	18	.438
Oregon State	5	–	15	.250	13	–	19	.406
† 2024 Pac-12 tournament winner Rankings from AP Poll

The 2023–24 Stanford Cardinal men's basketball team represented Stanford University during the 2023–24 NCAA Division I men's basketball season. The Cardinal were competing in their last season as a member of the Pac-12 Conference after 45 years as they joined the Atlantic Coast Conference in the 2024–25 season. They played home games at Maples Pavilion. They were led by eighth-year head coach Jerod Haase, who was fired minutes after the team lost its last game of the season.

== Previous season ==
The Cardinal went 14–19 overall and 7–13 in the Pac-12 conference. They finished 10th in the conference and would play 7th seed Utah in the first round and won 73–62. In the quarterfinals they faced 2nd seed and 8th ranked Arizona but lost 95–84. Finishing with a losing record the Cardinal were not invited to any postseason tournaments.

== Offseason ==
=== Departures ===
Stanford Departures
Name	Number	Pos.	Height	Weight	Year	Hometown	Reason for Departure
Neal Begovich	21	F	6'9"	230	RS-Junior	San Francisco, CA	Transferred to Duke
Harrison Ingram	55	F	6'7"	230	Sophomore	Dallas, TX	Transferred to North Carolina
Isa Silva	1	G	6'4"	185	Sophomore	Napa, CA	Transferred to Long Beach State
Jarvis Moss	3	G	6'4"	200	Sophomore	Concord, NC	Transferred to Davidson
Michael O'Connell	5	G	6'2"	195	Junior	Mineola, NY	Transferred to NC State

=== 2023 recruiting class ===
College recruiting information
Name	Hometown	School	Height	Weight	Commit date
Kanaan Carlyle; G	Alpharetta, GA	Milton High School	6 ft 3 in (1.91 m)	185 lb (84 kg)	Jan 6, 2022
Kanaan Carlyle; G	Recruit ratings: Rivals: 247Sports: ESPN: (87)				
Andrej Stojaković; SF	Carmichael, CA	Jesuit High School	6 ft 7 in (2.01 m)	185 lb (84 kg)	Nov 7, 2022
Andrej Stojaković; SF	Recruit ratings: Rivals: 247Sports: ESPN: (89)				
Aidan Commann; PF	Wolfeboro, NH	Brewster Academy	6 ft 10 in (2.08 m)	215 lb (98 kg)	May 14, 2023
Aidan Commann; PF	Recruit ratings: Rivals:				
Cameron Grant; F	Lakewood, OH	St. Edward High School	6 ft 7 in (2.01 m)	N/A	May 9, 2023
Cameron Grant; F	Recruit ratings: No ratings found				
Overall recruit ranking: Rivals: 7
Note: In many cases, Scout, Rivals, 247Sports, On3, and ESPN may conflict in their listings of height and weight.; In these cases, the average was taken. ESPN grades are on a 100-point scale.; Sources: "Stanford 2023 Basketball Commitments". Rivals.; "2023 Team Ranking". Rivals.

=== Incoming transfers ===
Stanford Additions
Name	Number	Pos.	Height	Weight	Year	Hometown	Notes
Jared Bynum	1	G	5'10"	172	Graduate Student	Largo, MD	Transfer from Providence

== Roster ==
2023–24 Stanford Cardinal men's basketball team
Players
Coaches

Pos.	#	Name	Height	Weight	Year	Previous school	Hometown
G	1	Jared Bynum	5 ft 10 in (1.78 m)	185 lb (84 kg)	GS	Georgetown Preparatory School; Saint Joseph's; Providence	Rockville, MD
G	2	Andrej Stojaković	6 ft 7 in (2.01 m)	190 lb (86 kg)	Fr	Jesuit High School	Carmichael, CA
G	3	Kanaan Carlyle	6 ft 3 in (1.91 m)	185 lb (84 kg)	Fr	Milton High School	Alpharetta, GA
G	4	Roy Yuan (W)	6 ft 1 in (1.85 m)	170 lb (77 kg)	GS	Saint Francis High School	San Jose, CA
F	10	Max Murrell	6 ft 9 in (2.06 m)	225 lb (102 kg)	Sr	Millard North High School	Omaha, NE
G	11	Ryan Agarwal	6 ft 6 in (1.98 m)	190 lb (86 kg)	So	Coppell High School	Coppell, TX
G	13	Michael Jones	6 ft 5 in (1.96 m)	205 lb (93 kg)	Sr	Milton High School	Woodbury, MN
F	14	Spencer Jones	6 ft 7 in (2.01 m)	225 lb (102 kg)	GS	Bishop Miege High School	Roeland Park, KS
G	15	Benny Gealer	6 ft 1 in (1.85 m)	160 lb (73 kg)	So	Rolling Hills Preparatory	Palos Verdes Estates, CA
F	20	Cameron Grant (W)	6 ft 7 in (2.01 m)	185 lb (84 kg)	Fr	St. Edward High School	Lakewood, OH
F	22	James Keefe	6 ft 9 in (2.06 m)	240 lb (109 kg)	GS	Loyola	Los Angeles, CA
F	23	Brandon Angel	6 ft 8 in (2.03 m)	235 lb (107 kg)	Sr	Torrey Pines High School	San Diego, CA
F	24	Jaylen Thompson	6 ft 8 in (2.03 m)	195 lb (88 kg)	RS Fr	Southern California Academy	Alameda, CA
G	25	Josue Gil–Silva	6 ft 1 in (1.85 m)	185 lb (84 kg)	GS	Alisal High School	Salinas, CA
F	42	Maxime Raynaud	7 ft 1 in (2.16 m)	250 lb (113 kg)	Jr	Lycée Henri-IV	Paris, France
F	52	Aidan Cammann	6 ft 10 in (2.08 m)	220 lb (100 kg)	Fr	Brewster Academy	Wolfeboro, NH

Head coach

- Jerod Haase (Kansas)

Assistant coach(es)

- Jesse Pruitt (UC Davis)
- Robert Ehsan (UC Davis)
- Brandon Dunson (Arizona State)

Legend

- (C) Team captain
- (S) Suspended
- (I) Ineligible
- (W) Walk-on
- Injured
- Current redshirt

Roster

== Schedule and results ==
Date time, TV	Rank^{#}	Opponent^{#}	Result	Record	High points	High rebounds	High assists	Site (attendance) city, state
Non-conference regular season
November 6, 2023; 8:00 p.m., P12N		Cal State Northridge	W 88–79	1–0	23 – Raynaud	15 – Raynaud	7 – Bynum	Maples Pavilion (2,133); Stanford, CA
November 10, 2023; 6:00 p.m., P12N		Sacramento State	W 91–73	2–0	18 – Angel	7 – Raynaud	10 – Bynum	Maples Pavilion (2,559); Stanford, CA
November 14, 2023; 6:00 p.m., P12N		Santa Clara	L 77–89	2–1	26 – Raynaud	7 – Raynaud	7 – Bynum	Maples Pavilion (2,649); Stanford, CA
November 17, 2023; 6:00 p.m., P12N		Eastern Washington	W 95–70	3–1	18 – Stojaković	12 – Keefe	10 – Bynum	Maples Pavilion (2,038); Stanford, CA
November 22, 2023*; 4:30 p.m., ESPNU		vs. No. 20 Arkansas; Battle 4 Atlantis Quarterfinals	L 74–77 ^{2OT}	3–2	27 – S. Jones	10 – Reynaud	8 – Bynum	Imperial Arena (820); Nassau, Bahamas
November 23, 2023*; 5:45 p.m., ESPN2		vs. Michigan; Battle 4 Atlantis consolation 2nd round	L 78–83	3–3	22 – Bynum	8 – Raynaud	6 – Bynum	Imperial Arena (680); Nassau, Bahamas
November 24, 2023*; 5:30 p.m., ESPN+		vs. Northern Iowa; Battle 4 Atlantis 7th place game	L 51–73	3–4	12 – Raynaud	8 – Raynaud	5 – Bynum	Imperial Arena (611); Nassau, Bahamas
December 3, 2023; 4:00 p.m., P12N		San Diego	W 88–66	4–4	25 – Angel	9 – Raynaud	5 – Tied	Maples Pavilion (2,455); Stanford, CA
December 17, 2023; 2:00 p.m., P12N		Idaho	W 82–64	5–4	17 – Stojaković	13 – Raynaud	6 – Bynum	Maples Pavilion (4,345); Stanford, CA
December 21, 2023*; 6:00 p.m., CBSSN		at San Diego State	L 60–74	5–5	15 – Raynaud	7 – Raynaud	3 – Tied	Viejas Arena (12,414); San Diego, CA
Pac-12 regular season
December 29, 2023; 8:00 p.m., ESPN2		Arizona State	L 73–76	5–6 (0–1)	15 – Tied	15 – Raynaud	6 – Bynum	Maples Pavilion (2,801); Stanford, CA
December 31, 2023; 1:00 p.m., P12N		No. 4 Arizona	W 100–82	6–6 (1–1)	28 – Carlyle	8 – Carlyle	11 – Bynum	Maples Pavilion (4,155); Stanford, CA
January 3, 2024; 6:00 p.m., ESPN2		at UCLA	W 59–53	7–6 (2–1)	17 – Carlyle	9 – Raynaud	4 – Carlyle	Pauley Pavilion (6,224); Los Angeles, CA
January 6, 2024; 1:00 p.m., P12N		at USC	L 79–93	7–7 (2–2)	23 – M. Jones	10 – Raynaud	6 – Angel	Galen Center (6,481); Los Angeles, CA
January 11, 2024; 8:00 p.m., ESPN2		at Oregon State	W 88–84 ^{OT}	8–7 (3–2)	22 – Carlyle	13 – Raynaud	6 – Carlyle	Gill Coliseum (3,423); Corvallis, OR
January 14, 2024; 2:00 p.m., P12N		Utah	W 79–73	9–7 (4–2)	20 – Raynaud	11 – Raynaud	5 – Gealer	Maples Pavilion (3,037); Stanford, CA
January 18, 2024; 8:00 p.m., P12N		Washington State	L 75–89	9–8 (4–3)	31 – Carlyle	10 – Raynaud	4 – Gealer	Maples Pavilion (2,855); Stanford, CA
January 20, 2024; 6:00 p.m., P12N		Washington	W 90–80	10–8 (5–3)	30 – S. Jones	9 – Raynaud	5 – Caryle	Maples Pavilion (4,174); Stanford, CA
January 26, 2024; 7:00 p.m., FS1		at California; Rivalry	L 71–73	10–9 (5–4)	13 – S. Jones	13 – Raynaud	2 – Tied	Haas Pavilion (8,710); Berkeley, CA
February 1, 2024; 6:00 p.m., ESPN2		at Arizona State	W 71–62	11–9 (6–4)	19 – Angel	17 – Raynaud	4 – Gealer	Desert Financial Arena (7,234); Tempe, AZ
February 4, 2024; 5:00 p.m., FS1		at No. 11 Arizona	L 71–82	11–10 (6–5)	29 – Raynaud	7 – Angel	9 – Gealer	McKale Center (14,688); Tucson, AZ
February 7, 2024; 6:00 p.m., P12N		UCLA	L 74–82	11–11 (6–6)	20 – Raynaud	10 – Raynaud	6 – Jones	Maples Pavilion (3,844); Stanford, CA
February 10, 2024; 7:00 p.m., ESPNU		USC	W 99–68	12–11 (7–6)	25 – Raynaud	9 – Raynaud	5 – Raynaud	Maples Pavilion (7,563); Stanford, CA
February 15, 2024; 6:00 p.m., ESPN2		at Washington	L 65–85	12–12 (7–7)	19 – Tied	16 – Raynaud	2 – Tied	Alaska Airlines Arena (6,927); Seattle, WA
February 17, 2024; 3:00 p.m., P12N		at Washington State	L 59–79	12–13 (7–8)	15 – Angel	5 – Raynaud	5 – Carlyle	Beasley Coliseum (5,671); Pullman, WA
February 22, 2024; 8:00 p.m., ESPN2		Oregon	L 65–78	12–14 (7–9)	21 – Angel	7 – Raynaud	4 – Carlyle	Maples Pavilion (3,284); Stanford, CA
February 24, 2024; 2:00 p.m., P12N		Oregon State	L 73–85	12–15 (7–10)	29 – Raynaud	8 – Raynaud	4 – Carlyle	Maples Pavilion (3,755); Stanford, CA
February 29, 2024; 5:30 p.m., P12N		at Utah	L 68–90	12–16 (7–11)	20 – M. Jones	6 – Tied	3 – Gealer	Jon M. Huntsman Center (8,833); Salt Lake City, UT
March 3, 2024; 6:00 p.m., FS1		at Colorado	L 71–81	12–17 (7–12)	26 – Raynaud	12 – Raynaud	3 – Carlyle	CU Events Center (7,518); Boulder, CO
March 7, 2024; 8:00 p.m., ESPN2		California; Rivalry/Senior Night	W 80–58	13–17 (8–12)	18 – Raynaud	8 – Raynaud	4 – Raynaud	Maples Pavilion (4,967); Stanford, CA
Pac-12 Tournament
March 13, 2024; 6:00 p.m., P12N	(10)	vs. (7) California; First round/Rivalry	W 87–76 ^{OT}	14–17	21 – Raynaud	13 – Raynaud	5 – Gealer	T-Mobile Arena (10,133); Paradise, NV
March 14, 2024; 6:00 p.m., P12N	(10)	vs. (2) No. 22 Washington State; Quarterfinal	L 62–79	14–18	22 – Jones	6 – Angel	3 – Angel	T-Mobile Arena (11,428); Paradise, NV
*Non-conference game. ^{#}Rankings from AP Poll. (#) Tournament seedings in parentheses. All times are in Pacific Time.
