= 2023–24 Weber State Wildcats men's basketball team =

American college basketball season

2023–24 Weber State Wildcats men's basketball
- Conference: Big Sky Conference
- Record: 20–12 (11–7 Big Sky)
- Head coach: Eric Duft (2nd season)
- Assistant coaches: Eric Daniels; Dan Russell; Jorge Ruiz
- Home arena: Dee Events Center

2023–24 Big Sky men's basketball standings
	Conf.				Overall
Team	W		L	PCT	W		L	PCT
Eastern Washington	15	–	3	.833	21	–	11	.656
Northern Colorado	12	–	6	.667	19	–	14	.576
Montana	12	–	6	.667	24	–	12	.667
Weber State	11	–	7	.611	20	–	12	.625
Montana State †	9	–	9	.500	17	–	18	.486
Portland State	8	–	10	.444	17	–	15	.531
Northern Arizona	7	–	11	.389	14	–	19	.424
Idaho State	7	–	11	.389	14	–	20	.412
Idaho	5	–	13	.278	11	–	21	.344
Sacramento State	4	–	14	.222	10	–	24	.294
† 2024 Big Sky tournament winner

The 2023–24 Weber State Wildcats men's basketball team represented Weber State University in the 2023–24 NCAA Division I men's basketball season. They were led by second-year head coach Eric Duft and played their home games at the Dee Events Center as members of the Big Sky Conference.

== Previous season ==
The Wildcats finished the season 18–15, 12–6 in conference play to finish in third place. In the Big Sky tournament, the Wildcats defeated the Sacramento State in their quarterfinals game, before losing against Montana State in double overtime to end their season.

== Roster ==
2023–24 Weber State Wildcats men's basketball team
Players
Coaches

Pos.	#	Name	Height	Weight	Year	Hometown
G	0	Blaise Threatt	6 ft 3 in (1.91 m)	210 lb (95 kg)	Jr	Scottsdale, Arizona
F	2	Dillon Jones	6 ft 6 in (1.98 m)	235 lb (107 kg)	Jr	Columbia, South Carolina
G	3	KJ Cunningham	6 ft 2 in (1.88 m)	190 lb (86 kg)	Sr	Bryan, Texas
F	4	Dyson Koehler	6 ft 7 in (2.01 m)	220 lb (100 kg)	Jr	Draper, Utah
G	5	Cole Lake	5 ft 11 in (1.8 m)	175 lb (79 kg)	Jr	Eagle, Idaho
G/F	8	Viljami Vartiainen	6 ft 6 in (1.98 m)	195 lb (88 kg)	Fr	Helsinki, Finland
F	10	Marko Sarenac	6 ft 10 in (2.08 m)	220 lb (100 kg)	Fr	Zrenjanin, Serbia
G	11	Steven Verplancken	6 ft 4 in (1.93 m)	205 lb (93 kg)	Sr	San Pedro, Dominican Republic
G/F	12	Chris Dockery	6 ft 6 in (1.98 m)	185 lb (84 kg)	RS Fr	Las Vegas, Nevada
G	13	Carter Gittens	6 ft 5 in (1.96 m)	215 lb (98 kg)	Fr	Peoria, Arizona
G	15	Isaiah Somers	6 ft 5 in (1.96 m)	200 lb (91 kg)	Jr	Chandler, Arizona
C	20	Alex Tew	6 ft 11 in (2.11 m)	250 lb (113 kg)	Jr	Cheshire, England
G	23	Nemanja Sarenac	6 ft 6 in (1.98 m)	200 lb (91 kg)	Fr	Belgrade, Serbia
F	30	Louie Jordan	6 ft 9 in (2.06 m)	215 lb (98 kg)	So	Leicester, England
F	31	Arnaud Revaz	6 ft 10 in (2.08 m)	230 lb (104 kg)	Jr	Sion, Switzerland
C	32	Handje Tamba	6 ft 11 in (2.11 m)	230 lb (104 kg)	So	Kinshasa, Democratic Republic of Congo

Head coach

- Eric Duft (Sterling (KS))

Assistant coach(es)

- Eric Daniels (Johnson & Wales)
- Dan Russell (Wyoming)
- Jorge Ruiz (Grand Canyon)

Legend

- (C) Team captain
- (S) Suspended
- (I) Ineligible
- (W) Walk-on
- Injured
- Current redshirt

Roster
Last update: November 8, 2023

== Schedule and results ==
Date time, TV	Rank^{#}	Opponent^{#}	Result	Record	High points	High rebounds	High assists	Site (attendance) city, state
Exhibition
November 2, 2023*; 7:00 p.m.		Adams State	W 90–51		13 – Tied	10 – Jones	4 – Tied	Dee Events Center (–); Ogden, UT
Regular season
November 7, 2023*; 7:00 p.m.		Benedictine Mesa	W 96–62	1–0	26 – Jones	14 – Jones	3 – Tied	Dee Events Center (3,046); Ogden, UT
November 12, 2023*; 6:00 p.m., ESPN+		at No. 23 Saint Mary's	W 61–57	2–0	29 – Jones	10 – Jones	3 – Threatt	University Credit Union Pavilion (3,398); Moraga, CA
November 17, 2023*; 2:00 p.m., ESPN+		vs. Gardner–Webb; Atlantic Slam	L 61–62	2–1	24 – Jones	9 – Jones	3 – Tied	Avenir Centre (100); Moncton, NB
November 18, 2023*; 4:00 p.m., ESPN+		vs. Yale; Atlantic Slam	W 75–65 ^{OT}	3–1	17 – Jones	15 – Jones	4 – Threatt	Avenir Centre (-); Moncton, NB
November 19, 2023*; 11:00 a.m., ESPN+		vs. Colgate; Atlantic Slam	L 55–57	3–2	14 – Jones	7 – Jones	5 – Jones	Avenir Centre (-); Moncton, NB
November 27, 2023*; 7:00 p.m., ESPN+		Navajo Tech	W 107–45	4–2	19 – Verplancken	11 – Threatt	7 – Threatt	Dee Events Center (2,776); Ogden, UT
December 5, 2023*; 6:00 p.m., ESPN+		at Utah Valley	L 54–70	4–3	13 – Jones	8 – Tew	3 – Tied	UCCU Center (1,651); Orem, UT
December 9, 2023*; 7:00 p.m., ESPN+		Cal Poly	W 78–50	5–3	18 – Koehler	10 – Jones	9 – Jones	Dee Events Center (3,636); Ogden, UT
December 13, 2023*; 8:00 p.m., MW Network		at Nevada	L 55–72	5–4	18 – Threatt	12 – Jones	4 – Threatt	Lawlor Events Center (7,062); Reno, NV
December 16, 2023*; 7:00 p.m., MW Network		at Wyoming	W 84–71	6–4	19 – Koehler	11 – Jones	7 – Jones	Arena-Auditorium (3,447); Laramie, WY
December 21, 2023*; 2:00 p.m., ESPN+		Park-Gilbert	W 90–39	7–4	14 – Vartiainen	11 – Jones	7 – Tied	Dee Events Center (2,046); Ogden, UT
December 28, 2023; 7:00 p.m., ESPN+		Montana	W 93–63	8–4 (1–0)	18 – Threatt	7 – Koehler	5 – Jones	Dee Events Center (5,095); Ogden, UT
December 30, 2023; 2:00 p.m., ESPN+		Montana State	W 86–64	9–4 (2–0)	29 – Jones	13 – Jones	6 – Jones	Dee Events Center (4,886); Ogden, UT
January 3, 2024*; 7:00 p.m., ESPN+		South Dakota State; Big Sky-Summit League Challenge	W 75–73	10–4	23 – Jones	10 – Tew	9 – Jones	Dee Events Center (5,107); Ogden, UT
January 6, 2024*; 6:00 p.m.		at Oral Roberts; Big Sky-Summit League Challenge	W 83–78	11–4	26 – Jones	10 – Jones	6 – Jones	Mabee Center (5,557); Tulsa, OK
January 11, 2024; 7:00 p.m., ESPN+		at Sacramento State	L 69–71	11–5 (2–1)	30 – Verplancken	7 – Jones	5 – Jones	Hornets Nest (531); Sacramento, CA
January 13, 2024; 5:00 p.m., ESPN+		at Portland State	L 66–69	11–6 (2–2)	21 – Koehler	7 – Jones	5 – Jones	Viking Pavilion (161); Portland, OR
January 18, 2024; 7:00 p.m., ESPN+		Eastern Washington	L 78–80	11–7 (2–3)	16 – Verplancken	12 – Jones	6 – Koehler	Dee Events Center (-); Ogden, UT
January 20, 2024; 7:00 p.m., ESPN+		Idaho	W 88–65	12–7 (3–3)	24 – Threatt	11 – Jones	8 – Jones	Dee Events Center (6,519); Ogden, UT
January 22, 2024; 7:00 p.m., ESPN+		at Montana	L 62–77	12–8 (3–4)	30 – Jones	7 – Jones	3 – Jones	Dahlberg Arena (3,163); Missoula, MT
January 27, 2024; 7:00 p.m., ESPN+		Idaho State	L 64–74	12–9 (3–5)	19 – Jones	10 – Jones	5 – Jones	Dee Events Center (5,445); Ogden, UT
February 1, 2024; 6:00 p.m., ESPN+		at Northern Arizona	W 72–70	13–9 (4–5)	26 – Jones	8 – Jones	4 – Jones	Findlay Toyota Court (803); Flagstaff, AZ
February 3, 2024; 6:00 p.m., ESPN+		Northern Colorado	W 82–63	14–9 (5–5)	21 – Jones	9 – Jones	5 – Jones	Bank of Colorado Arena (1,507); Greeley, CO
February 8, 2024; 7:00 p.m., ESPN+		Portland State	W 84–72	15–9 (6–5)	20 – Jones	15 – Jones	7 – Jones	Dee Events Center (5,875); Ogden, UT
February 10, 2024; 7:00 p.m., ESPN+		Sacramento State	W 58–53	16–9 (7–5)	21 – Jones	8 – Tew	5 – Jones	Dee Events Center (7,460); Ogden, UT
February 15, 2024; 7:00 p.m., ESPN+		at Idaho	W 70–69	17–9 (8–5)	29 – Jones	6 – Tied	9 – Jones	ICCU Arena (1,340); Moscow, ID
February 17, 2024; 3:00 p.m., ESPN+		at Eastern Washington	W 90–84	18–9 (9–5)	30 – Jones	8 – Jones	8 – Jones	Reese Court (1,786); Cheney, WA
February 24, 2024; 6:00 p.m., ESPN+		at Idaho State	L 62–80	18–10 (9–6)	17 – Jones	10 – Jones	2 – Tied	Reed Gym (2,100); Pocatello, ID
February 29, 2024; 7:00 p.m., ESPN+		at Northern Colorado	W 85–81 ^{OT}	19–10 (10–6)	30 – Jones	23 – Jones	9 – Jones	Dee Events Center (6,018); Ogden, UT
March 2, 2024; 2:00 p.m., ESPN+		Northern Arizona	W 85–58	20–10 (11–6)	21 – Jones	14 – Jones	7 – Jones	Dee Events Center (5,681); Ogden, UT
March 4, 2024; 7:00 p.m., ESPN2		at Montana State	L 64–76	20–11 (11–7)	24 – Jones	9 – Jones	3 – Jones	Worthington Arena (3,137); Bozeman, MT
Big Sky tournament
March 11, 2024; 5:30 pm, ESPN+	(4)	vs. (5) Montana State; Quarterfinals	L 82-91	20-12	20 – Threatt	11 – Threatt	5 – Jones	Idaho Central Arena; Boise, ID
*Non-conference game. ^{#}Rankings from AP Poll. (#) Tournament seedings in parentheses. All times are in Mountain Time.
