= 2024 Big Sky Conference men's basketball tournament =

American collegiate postseason tournament

- Classification: Division I
- Season: 2023–24
- Teams: 10
- Site: Idaho Central Arena; Boise, Idaho
- Champions: Montana State (5th title)
- Winning coach: Matt Logie (1st title)
- MVP: Robert Ford III (Montana State)
- Television: ESPN+, ESPNU, ESPN2

2023–24 Big Sky men's basketball standings
	Conf.				Overall
Team	W		L	PCT	W		L	PCT
Eastern Washington	15	–	3	.833	21	–	11	.656
Northern Colorado	12	–	6	.667	19	–	14	.576
Montana	12	–	6	.667	24	–	12	.667
Weber State	11	–	7	.611	20	–	12	.625
Montana State †	9	–	9	.500	17	–	18	.486
Portland State	8	–	10	.444	17	–	15	.531
Northern Arizona	7	–	11	.389	14	–	19	.424
Idaho State	7	–	11	.389	14	–	20	.412
Idaho	5	–	13	.278	11	–	21	.344
Sacramento State	4	–	14	.222	10	–	24	.294
† 2024 Big Sky tournament winner

The 2024 Big Sky Conference men's basketball tournament was the postseason tournament for the 2023-24 season in the Big Sky Conference, The tournament was held from March 9–13 at Idaho Central Arena in Boise, Idaho. It was the 49th edition of the tournament, which debuted in 1976. Fifth-seeded Montana State won the title and received an automatic bid to the NCAA tournament.

== Seeds ==
The ten teams were seeded by conference record, with a tiebreaker system for identical conference records. The top six teams received a first-round bye.

Seed	School	Record	Tiebreaker
1	Eastern Washington	15–3	
2	Northern Colorado	12–6	2–0 against Montana
3	Montana	12–6	0–2 against Northern Colorado
4	Weber State	11–7	
5	Montana State	9–9	
6	Portland State	8–10	
7	Northern Arizona	7–11	1–1 against Eastern Washington
8	Idaho State	7–11	0–2 against Eastern Washington
9	Idaho	5–13	
10	Sacramento State	4–14	

== Schedule ==
Session	Game	Time	Matchup	Score	Television
First round – Saturday, March 9
1	1	5:30 pm	No. 9 Idaho vs. No. 10 Sacramento State	64–72	ESPN+
1	2	8:00 pm	No. 7 Northern Arizona vs. No. 8 Idaho State	60–68	ESPN+
Quarterfinals – Sunday, March 10
2	3	5:30 pm	No. 1 Eastern Washington vs. No. 10 Sacramento State	69–74	ESPN+
2	4	8:00 pm	No. 2 Northern Colorado vs. No. 8 Idaho State	76–83	ESPN+
Quarterfinals – Monday, March 11
3	5	5:30 pm	No. 4 Weber State vs. No. 5 Montana State	82–91	ESPN+
3	6	8:00 pm	No. 3 Montana vs. No. 6 Portland State	87–81	ESPN+
Semifinals – Tuesday, March 12
4	7	6:30 pm	No. 10 Sacramento State vs. No. 5 Montana State	71–74	ESPNU/ESPN+
4	8	9:00 pm	No. 8 Idaho State vs. No. 3 Montana	58–72	ESPN2/ESPN+
Championship game – Wednesday, March 13
5	9	9:30 pm	No. 5 Montana State vs. No. 3 Montana	85–70	ESPN2/ESPN+
Game times in MT. Rankings denote tournament seeding.

== Bracket ==
First round March 9 ESPN+
9	Idaho	64
10	Sacramento State	72
7	Northern Arizona	60
8	Idaho State	68

Quarterfinals; March 10 & 11; ESPN+
1	Eastern Washington	69
10	Sacramento State	74
4	Weber State	82
5	Montana State	91
2	Northern Colorado	76
8	Idaho State	83
3	Montana	87
6	Portland State	81

Semifinals; Tuesday, March 12; ESPN2/ESPNU/ESPN+
10	Sacramento State	71
5	Montana State	74
8	Idaho State	58
3	Montana	72

Championship; Wednesday, March 13; ESPN2/ESPN+
5	Montana State	85
3	Montana	70
