= Matt Logie =

American basketball coach

Current position
- Title: Head coach
- Team: Montana State
- Conference: Big Sky
- Record: 52–54 (.491)

Biographical details
- Born: September 10, 1980 (age 46); Mercer Island, Washington, U.S.
- Education: Lehigh University (2003)

Coaching career (HC unless noted)
- 2004–2006: Lehigh (assistant)
- 2007–2009: Lehigh (assistant)
- 2009–2011: Lehigh (associate head coach)
- 2011–2019: Whitworth
- 2019–2023: Point Loma
- 2023–present: Montana State

Administrative career (AD unless noted)
- 2003–2004: Lehigh (director of basketball operations)
- 2006–2007: Kent State (director of basketball operations)

Head coaching record
- Overall: 328–112 (.745)
- Tournaments: 0–1 (NCAA D1); 2–3 (NCAA D2); 6–7 (NCAA D3)

Accomplishments and honors

Championships
- Big Sky tournament (2024)

Matt Logie (born September 10, 1980) is an American college basketball coach who is the current head coach of the Montana State Bobcats men's basketball team.

== Playing career ==
Logie played four years at Lehigh where he started in 114 games. In his career, he averaged 13.4 points per game, 2.6 rebounds per game, and 1.4 assists per game.

== Coaching career ==
Logie began his coaching career as the director of basketball operations at his alma mater Lehigh before being elevated to an assistant coach. He then serve as the director of basketball operations for Kent State for a single season before returning to Lehigh as an assistant, where he'd rise to associate head coach.

In 2011, Logie accepted his first head coaching position at Whitworth where he compiled a 194–34 record with five Northwest Conference regular season titles along with six NWC conference tournament titles, while making the NCAA tournament in seven of eight seasons. He'd move on to the head coaching position at Point Loma Nazarene where in three seasons he'd post an 82–23 record, guiding the Sea Lions to two Pacific West Conference tournament titles, along with a perfect 20–0 conference record during the 2022–23 season.

On April 17, 2023, Logie was hired by Montana State as their next head coach replacing Danny Sprinkle who departed for the head coaching job at Utah State.

== Head coaching record ==
=== NCAA DI ===
Record table
Season	Team	Overall	Conference	Standing	Postseason
Montana State Bobcats (Big Sky) (2023–present)
2023–24	Montana State	17–18	9–9	5th	NCAA Division I First Four
2024–25	Montana State	15–18	9–9	T–5th	
2025–26	Montana State	18–14	12–6	2nd	
2026–27	Montana State	2–4	0–0		
Montana State:		52–54 (.491)	30–24 (.556)		
Total:		52–54 (.491)			
National champion Postseason invitational champion Conference regular season champion Conference regular season and conference tournament champion Division regular season champion Division regular season and conference tournament champion Conference tournament champion

=== NCAA DIII ===
Record table
Season	Team	Overall	Conference	Standing	Postseason
Whitworth Pirates (NWC) (2011–2019)
2011–12	Whitworth	26–4	15–1	1st	NCAA Division III Sweet 16
2012–13	Whitworth	26–4	14–2	1st	NCAA Division III Sweet 16
2013–14	Whitworth	23–6	14–2	1st	NCAA Division III Second Round
2014–15	Whitworth	25–4	15–1	1st	NCAA Division III Second Round
2015–16	Whitworth	26–2	15–1	1st	NCAA Division III Second Round
2016–17	Whitworth	23–5	13–3	2nd	NCAA Division III First Round
2017–18	Whitworth	24–4	14–2	2nd	NCAA Division III First Round
2018–19	Whitworth	21–6	12–4	2nd	
Whitworth:		194–35 (.847)	112–16 (.875)		
Total:		194–35 (.847)			
National champion Postseason invitational champion Conference regular season champion Conference regular season and conference tournament champion Division regular season champion Division regular season and conference tournament champion Conference tournament champion

=== NCAA DII ===
Record table
Season	Team	Overall	Conference	Standing	Postseason
Point Loma Sea Lions (PacWest) (2019–2023)
2019–20	Point Loma	24–6	18–4	2nd	NCAA Division II Canceled
2020–21	Point Loma	8–3	7–2	2nd	NCAA Division II First Round
2021–22	Point Loma	21–10	16–4	1st	NCAA Division II First Round
2022–23	Point Loma	29–4	20–0	1st	NCAA Division II Sweet 16
Point Loma:		82–23 (.781)	61–10 (.859)		
Total:		82–23 (.781)			
National champion Postseason invitational champion Conference regular season champion Conference regular season and conference tournament champion Division regular season champion Division regular season and conference tournament champion Conference tournament champion
