= 2023–24 Idaho Vandals men's basketball team =

American college basketball season

2023–24 Idaho Vandals men's basketball
- Conference: Big Sky Conference
- Record: 11–21 (5–13 Big Sky)
- Head coach: Alex Pribble (1st season)
- Associate head coach: Brandon Laird (1st season)
- Assistant coaches: David Dunham; Matt Jones
- Home arena: ICCU Arena

2023–24 Big Sky men's basketball standings
	Conf.				Overall
Team	W		L	PCT	W		L	PCT
Eastern Washington	15	–	3	.833	21	–	11	.656
Northern Colorado	12	–	6	.667	19	–	14	.576
Montana	12	–	6	.667	24	–	12	.667
Weber State	11	–	7	.611	20	–	12	.625
Montana State †	9	–	9	.500	17	–	18	.486
Portland State	8	–	10	.444	17	–	15	.531
Northern Arizona	7	–	11	.389	14	–	19	.424
Idaho State	7	–	11	.389	14	–	20	.412
Idaho	5	–	13	.278	11	–	21	.344
Sacramento State	4	–	14	.222	10	–	24	.294
† 2024 Big Sky tournament winner

The 2023–24 Idaho Vandals men's basketball team represented the University of Idaho in the 2023–24 NCAA Division I men's basketball season. They were led by first-year head coach Alex Pribble and played their games at Idaho Central Credit Union Arena as members of the Big Sky Conference.

== Previous season ==
The Vandals finished the 2022–23 season 10–22, 4–14 in conference play, to finish in last place. In the Big Sky tournament, the team lost their first-round game against Northern Arizona to end their season. Following the season, the university fired fourth-year head coach Zac Claus. In late March, Seattle assistant coach Alex Pribble was hired as the program's new head coach.

== Roster ==
2023–24 Idaho Vandals men's basketball team
Players
Coaches

Pos.	#	Name	Height	Weight	Year	Hometown
F	0	Julius Mims	6 ft 9 in (2.06 m)	190 lb (86 kg)	Jr	Billings, MT
G	1	Trevon Blassingame	6 ft 4 in (1.93 m)	180 lb (82 kg)	So	Auburn, WA
F	2	Tyler Mrus	6 ft 7 in (2.01 m)	205 lb (93 kg)	So	Bothell, WA
G	3	Quinn Denker	6 ft 3 in (1.91 m)	195 lb (88 kg)	Jr	San Jose, CA
G	4	EJ Neal	6 ft 5 in (1.96 m)	200 lb (91 kg)	Jr	San Francisco, CA
G	5	D'Angelo Minnis	5 ft 10 in (1.78 m)	170 lb (77 kg)	Sr	Kent, WA
G	10	Kristian Gonzalez	6 ft 3 in (1.91 m)	180 lb (82 kg)	Fr	Chula Vista, CA
G	11	Titus Yearout	6 ft 2 in (1.88 m)	180 lb (82 kg)	RS Fr	Lapwai, ID
F	15	Terren Frank	6 ft 8 in (2.03 m)	230 lb (104 kg)	RS Jr	Los Angeles, CA
F	22	Tyler Linhardt	6 ft 7 in (2.01 m)	220 lb (100 kg)	RS Fr	Seattle, WA
F	23	Takai Hardy	6 ft 7 in (2.01 m)	220 lb (100 kg)	Fr	Fairfield, CA
G	24	Miles Klapper	6 ft 3 in (1.91 m)	185 lb (84 kg)	Fr	Hillsborough, CA
F	32	Cooper Church	6 ft 9 in (2.06 m)	215 lb (98 kg)	So	Maple Valley, WA
G	33	Jack Hatten	6 ft 6 in (1.98 m)	200 lb (91 kg)	RS So	Bakersfield, CA
F	34	Kyson Rose	6 ft 9 in (2.06 m)	245 lb (111 kg)	Jr	Kennewick, WA

Head coach

- Alex Pribble (California)

Assistant coach(es)

- Brandon Laird (UC Davis)
- David Dunham (Lewis-Clark)
- Matt Jones (Trinity (Texas))

Legend

- (C) Team captain
- (S) Suspended
- (I) Ineligible
- (W) Walk-on
- Injured
- Current redshirt

Roster
Last update: July 17, 2024

== Schedule and results ==
Date time, TV	Rank^{#}	Opponent^{#}	Result	Record	High points	High rebounds	High assists	Site (attendance) city, state
Regular season
November 6, 2023*; 8:00 p.m., Pac-12 WA		at Washington State; Battle of the Palouse	L 59–84	0–1	12 – Denker	7 – Mims	3 – Rose	Beasley Coliseum (2,323); Pullman, WA
November 9, 2023*; 6:00 p.m., ESPN+		Cal State Northridge	L 73–76	0–2	18 – Frank	6 – Frank	6 – Denker	ICCU Arena (978); Moscow, ID
November 14, 2023*; 6:00 p.m., ESPN+		Evergreen State	W 88–42	1–2	15 – Neal	8 – Frank	4 – tied	ICCU Arena (1,489); Moscow, ID
November 17, 2023*; 6:00 p.m., ESPN+		Pacific Lutheran	W 96–52	2–2	16 – tied	9 – Mims	5 – Mims	ICCU Arena (1,339); Moscow, ID
November 22, 2023*; 5:00 p.m.		at Seattle	L 55–92	2–3	12 – Rose	5 – tied	3 – Denker	Redhawk Center (999); Seattle, WA
November 24, 2023*; 3:00 p.m.		vs. UC San Diego	W 73–70 ^{OT}	3–3	17 – Mims	12 – Mims	3 – tied	Redhawk Center (592); Seattle, WA
November 29, 2023*; 6:00 p.m., ESPN+		Denver	L 65–67	3–4	15 – Minnis	10 – Mims	7 – Minnis	ICCU Arena (1,337); Moscow, ID
December 2, 2023*; 2:00 p.m., ESPN+		Cal Poly	W 85–70	4–4	18 – Minnis	7 – tied	3 – tied	ICCU Arena (1,898); Moscow, ID
December 5, 2023*; 6:00 p.m., ESPN+		Pacific	W 83–53	5–4	22 – Denker	7 – Frank	3 – Denker	ICCU Arena (1,490); Moscow, ID
December 9, 2023*; 6:00 p.m.		at Utah Tech	W 63–62	6–4	18 – Denker	7 – Mims	8 – Rose	Burns Arena (1,501); St. George, UT
December 17, 2023*; 2:00 p.m.		at Stanford	L 64–82	6–5	16 – Linhardt	5 – tied	3 – tied	Maples Pavilion (4,345); Palo Alto, CA
December 21, 2023*; 5:00 p.m.		at UC Riverside	L 67–82	6–6	23 – Mims	11 – Mims	9 – Minnis	SRC Arena (347); Riverside, CA
December 28, 2023; 6:00 p.m., ESPN+		Sacramento State	W 61–58	7–6 (1–0)	21 – Denker	9 – Mims	3 – Linhardt	ICCU Arena (1,385); Moscow, ID
December 30, 2023; 2:00 p.m., ESPN+		Portland State	L 72–77	7–7 (1–1)	18 – Linhardt	6 – tied	5 – Denker	ICCU Arena (1,616); Moscow, ID
January 3, 2024*; 6:00 p.m., ESPN+		St. Thomas; Big Sky–Summit League Challenge	L 67–75	7–8	19 – Mims	14 – Mims	8 – Denker	ICCU Arena (1,286); Moscow, ID
January 13, 2024; 4:00 p.m., ESPN+		Eastern Washington	L 58–79	7–9 (1–2)	16 – Denker	6 – Frank	3 – tied	ICCU Arena (2,256); Moscow, ID
January 18, 2024; 6:00 p.m., ESPN+		at Idaho State; Battle of the Domes	L 59–64	7–10 (1–3)	14 – Denker	6 – tied	5 – Denker	Reed Gym (–); Pocatello, ID
January 20, 2024; 6:00 p.m., ESPN+		at Weber State	L 65–88	7–11 (1–4)	21 – Mims	6 – Mims	6 – Minnis	Dee Events Center (6,519); Ogden, UT
January 25, 2024; 6:00 p.m., ESPN+		Northern Arizona	L 60–75	7–12 (1–5)	15 – Mims	5 – Linhardt	4 – Denker	ICCU Arena (1,647); Moscow, ID
January 27, 2024; 2:00 p.m., ESPN+		Northern Colorado	L 68–89	7–13 (1–6)	14 – Denker	3 – tied	6 – Denker	ICCU Arena (1,754); Moscow, ID
February 1, 2024; 6:00 p.m., ESPN+		at Montana	L 70–73	7–14 (1–7)	20 – Denker	7 – Mims	5 – tied	Dahlberg Arena (2,963); Missoula, MT
February 3, 2024; 5:00 p.m., ESPN+		Montana State	W 81–75	8–14 (2–7)	15 – Mims	14 – Mims	3 – tied	Brick Breeden Fieldhouse (3,761); Bozeman, MT
February 5, 2024; 6:00 p.m., ESPN+		at Sacramento State	W 61–45	9–14 (3–7)	15 – Neal	8 – Mims	4 – tied	The Nest (707); Sacramento, CA
February 10, 2024; 4:30 p.m., ESPN+		at Eastern Washington	L 79–87	9–15 (3–8)	20 – Neal	8 – Mims	6 – Denker	Reese Court (2,174); Cheney, WA
February 15, 2024; 6:00 p.m., ESPN+		Weber State	L 69–70	9–16 (3–9)	17 – Mims	8 – Mims	7 – Denker	ICCU Arena (1,340); Moscow, ID
February 17, 2024; 2:00 p.m., ESPN+		Idaho State; Battle of the Domes	W 55–53	10–16 (4–9)	11 – tied	14 – Mims	3 – tied	ICCU Arena (1,793); Moscow, ID
February 22, 2024; 5:00 p.m., ESPN+		at Northern Colorado	L 62–76	10–17 (4–10)	23 – Denker	7 – Denker	4 – Denker	Bank of Colorado Arena (1,253); Greeley, CO
February 24, 2024; 1:00 p.m., ESPN+		at Northern Arizona	W 86–76	11–17 (5–10)	20 – Denker	8 – Frank	7 – Denker	Findlay Toyota Court; Flagstaff, AZ
February 29, 2024; 6:00 p.m., ESPN+		Montana State	L 48–62	11–18 (5–11)	8 – tied	8 – Frank	3 – Denker	ICCU Arena (1,537); Moscow, ID
March 2, 2024; 2:00 p.m., ESPN+		Montana	L 57–80	11–19 (5–12)	15 – Neal	7 – Mims	3 – Blassingame	ICCU Arena (2,470); Moscow, ID
March 4, 2024; 7:00 p.m., ESPN+		at Portland State	L 57–72	11–20 (5–13)	16 – Minnis	6 – Blassingame	5 – Denker	Viking Pavilion (1,007); Portland, OR
Big Sky tournament
March 9, 2024; 4:30 p.m., ESPN+	(9)	vs. (10) Sacramento State; First round	L 64–72	11–21	20 – Mims	7 – Mims	5 – Minnis	Idaho Central Arena; Boise, ID
*Non-conference game. ^{#}Rankings from AP poll. (#) Tournament seedings in parentheses. All times are in Pacific.
