= 2023–24 Northern Arizona Lumberjacks men's basketball team =

American college basketball season

2023–24 Northern Arizona Lumberjacks men's basketball
- Conference: Big Sky Conference
- Record: 14–19 (7–11 Big Sky)
- Head coach: Shane Burcar (5th season)
- Assistant coaches: Ben Johnson; Gary Bell Jr.; Tim Russo
- Home arena: Rolle Activity Center; Findlay Toyota Court

2023–24 Big Sky men's basketball standings
	Conf.				Overall
Team	W		L	PCT	W		L	PCT
Eastern Washington	15	–	3	.833	21	–	11	.656
Northern Colorado	12	–	6	.667	19	–	14	.576
Montana	12	–	6	.667	24	–	12	.667
Weber State	11	–	7	.611	20	–	12	.625
Montana State †	9	–	9	.500	17	–	18	.486
Portland State	8	–	10	.444	17	–	15	.531
Northern Arizona	7	–	11	.389	14	–	19	.424
Idaho State	7	–	11	.389	14	–	20	.412
Idaho	5	–	13	.278	11	–	21	.344
Sacramento State	4	–	14	.222	10	–	24	.294
† 2024 Big Sky tournament winner

The 2023–24 Northern Arizona Lumberjacks men's basketball team represented Northern Arizona University in the 2023–24 NCAA Division I men's basketball season. They were led by fifth-year head coach Shane Burcar and split their home games between Rolle Activity Center and Findlay Toyota Court. The Lumberjacks competed as members of the Big Sky Conference.

== Previous season ==
The Lumberjacks finished the season 12–23, 5–13 in conference play to finish in ninth place. In the Big Sky tournament, the team defeated Idaho, top-seeded Eastern Washington, and Montana to advance to the championship game. The Lumberjacks were the first 9-seed to ever advance to the championship of the Big Sky Tournament. Their run came to an end one victory short of an NCAA Tournament appearance with a loss to Montana State to end their season. Had they clinched the auto-bid, the Lumberjacks would have had the lowest winning-percentage of any team in NCAA Tournament history.

== Roster ==
2023–24 Northern Arizona Lumberjacks men's basketball team
Players
Coaches

Pos.	#	Name	Height	Weight	Year	Hometown
G	0	C.J. Ford	6 ft 0 in (1.83 m)	185 lb (84 kg)	So	Crowley, Texas
G	1	Arman Madi	6 ft 6 in (1.98 m)	220 lb (100 kg)	Fr	Paradise Valley, Arizona
G	3	Jayden Jackson	6 ft 4 in (1.93 m)	205 lb (93 kg)	Jr	Milwaukee, Wisconsin
G	4	Oakland Fort	5 ft 10 in (1.78 m)	170 lb (77 kg)	So	Phoenix, Arizona
F	6	Tichyque Musaka	6 ft 11 in (2.11 m)	200 lb (91 kg)	Fr	Durham, North Carolina
F	7	Carson Basham	6 ft 10 in (2.08 m)	240 lb (109 kg)	Jr	Phoenix, Arizona
F	10	Jack Wistrcill	6 ft 8 in (2.03 m)	225 lb (102 kg)	So	Salt Lake City, Utah
G	11	Ryan Abelman	6 ft 3 in (1.91 m)	185 lb (84 kg)	So	Las Vegas, Nevada
F	12	Diego Campisano	6 ft 5 in (1.96 m)	210 lb (95 kg)	RS So	San Diego, California
F	13	Rockwell Reynolds	6 ft 9 in (2.06 m)	—	Fr	Dana Point, California
G	21	Liam Lloyd	6 ft 5 in (1.96 m)	190 lb (86 kg)	Jr	Spokane, Washington
G	23	Isaiah Kai	6 ft 2 in (1.88 m)	—	Fr	Gilbert, Arizona
G	24	Trent McLaughlin	6 ft 6 in (1.98 m)	200 lb (91 kg)	Jr	Chandler, Arizona
F	33	Carson Towt	6 ft 8 in (2.03 m)	235 lb (107 kg)	RS Jr	Gilbert, Arizona

Head coach

- Shane Burcar (Ottawa)

Assistant coach(es)

- Ben Johnson (Green Bay)
- Gary Bell Jr. (Gonzaga)
- Tim Russo (Tampa)

Legend

- (C) Team captain
- (S) Suspended
- (I) Ineligible
- (W) Walk-on
- Injured
- Current redshirt

Roster
Last update: November 6, 2023

== Schedule and results ==
Date time, TV	Rank^{#}	Opponent^{#}	Result	Record	High points	High rebounds	High assists	Site (attendance) city, state
Exhibition
November 2, 2023*; 6:00 p.m.		SAGU American Indian	W 76–72	-	– -	– -	– -	Rolle Activity Center (-); Flagstaff, AZ
Regular season
November 6, 2023*; 4:30 p.m., FS1		at No. 6 UConn	L 52–95	0–1	15 – Lloyd	6 – Lloyd	5 – Lloyd	Harry A. Gampel Pavilion (10,299); Storrs, CT
November 12, 2023*; 3:30 p.m., ESPN+		at Grand Canyon	L 55–89	0–2	16 – Lloyd	7 – Lloyd	4 – Lloyd	GCU Arena (7,118); Phoenix, AZ
November 15, 2023*; 8:00 p.m., ESPN+		at Seattle	W 62–60	1–2	19 – McLaughlin	7 – Tied	12 – Lloyd	Climate Pledge Arena (1,410); Seattle, WA
November 17, 2023*; 2:30 p.m., ESPN+		vs. Purdue Fort Wayne; Arizona Tip-Off	L 67–77	1–3	14 – Fort	7 – Lloyd	5 – Fort	Desert Diamond Arena (1,028); Glendale, AZ
November 18, 2023*; 12:00 p.m.		vs. VMI; Arizona Tip-Off	W 78–69	2–3	21 – McLaughlin	10 – Basham	5 – Fort	Desert Diamond Arena (1,211); Glendale, AZ
November 21, 2023*; 11:30 p.m.		at Hawai'i	L 61–70	2–4	14 – McLaughlin	5 – Tied	3 – Fort	Stan Sheriff Center (3,853); Honolulu, HI
November 29, 2023*; 8:00 p.m., ESPN+		at UC Santa Barbara	L 59–70	2–5	17 – Jackson	6 – Tied	3 – Basham	The Thunderdome (1,603); Santa Barbara, CA
December 2, 2023*; 2:00 p.m.		Pacific	W 78–58	3–5	28 – McLaughlin	9 – Basham	4 – Tied	Rolle Activity Center (805); Flagstaff, AZ
December 6, 2023*; 6:00 p.m.		at Abilene Christian	W 78–76	4–5	22 – McLaughlin	11 – Jackson	3 – Tied	Moody Coliseum (1,153); Abilene, TX
December 9, 2023*; 2:00 p.m.		at Incarnate Word	W 76–75	5–5	20 – McLaughlin	7 – Campisano	5 – Lloyd	McDermott Convocation Center (58); San Antonio, TX
December 16, 2023*; 2:00 p.m.		Southern Utah	W 76–74	6–5	19 – McLaughlin	7 – Tied	5 – Tied	Rolle Activity Center; Flagstaff, AZ
December 20, 2023*; 8:00 p.m.		at San Francisco	L 51–91	6–6	9 – Lloyd	3 – Tied	2 – Tied	War Memorial Gymnasium (1,582); San Francisco, CA
December 30, 2023; 2:00 p.m., ESPN+		Northern Colorado	L 77–92	6–7 (0–1)	20 – McLaughlin	6 – Jackson	2 – Tied	Bank of Colorado Arena (1,090); Greeley, CO
January 3, 2024*; 6:00 p.m.		at Omaha; Big Sky-Summit League Challenge	L 55–81	6–8	11 – Fort	7 – Jackson	5 – McLaughlin	Baxter Arena (1,240); Omaha, NE
January 6, 2024*; 1:00 p.m.		North Dakota; Big Sky-Summit League Challenge	W 74–73	7–8	18 – Campisano	13 – Basham	4 – Fort	Findlay Toyota Court (-); Flagstaff, AZ
January 11, 2024; 7:00 p.m., ESPN+		at Montana State	L 50–79	7–9 (0–2)	13 – McLaughlin	6 – Basham	2 – Tied	Worthington Arena (1,608); Bozeman, MT
January 13, 2024; 7:00 p.m., ESPN+		at Montana	L 47–90	7–10 (0–3)	14 – Basham	6 – Basham	2 – Tied	Dahlberg Arena (2,968); Missoula, MT
January 18, 2024; 6:00 p.m., ESPN+		Portland State	W 84–65	8–10 (1–3)	23 – Basham	10 – Basham	5 – Fort	Findlay Toyota Court (825); Flagstaff, AZ
January 20, 2024; 2:00 p.m., ESPN+		Sacramento State	W 70–61	9–10 (2–3)	31 – McLaughlin	12 – Basham	5 – Fort	Findlay Toyota Court (967); Flagstaff, AZ
January 25, 2024; 6:00 p.m., ESPN+		at Idaho	W 75–60	10–10 (3–3)	25 – McLaughlin	10 – Fort	4 – Tied	ICCU Arena (1,647); Moscow, ID
January 27, 2024; 2:00 p.m., ESPN+		at Eastern Washington	L 70–85	10–11 (3–4)	22 – Basham	9 – Basham	6 – Jackson	Reese Court (1,675); Cheney, WA
February 1, 2024; 6:00 p.m., ESPN+		Weber State	L 70–72	10–12 (3–5)	29 – McLaughlin	8 – Jackson	4 – Tied	Findlay Toyota Court (803); Flagstaff, AZ
February 3, 2024; 2:00 p.m., ESPN+		Idaho State	L 79–81	10–13 (3–6)	20 – Fort	7 – Jackson	5 – Jackson	Findlay Toyota Court (773); Flagstaff, AZ
February 8, 2024; 6:00 p.m., ESPN+		Montana	L 66–94	10–14 (3–7)	15 – Basham	4 – Tied	6 – Lloyd	Findlay Toyota Court (308); Flagstaff, AZ
February 10, 2024; 2:00 p.m., ESPN+		Montana State	W 76–71	11–14 (4–7)	24 – McLaughlin	11 – Basham	6 – Fort	Findlay Toyota Court (709); Flagstaff, AZ
February 15, 2024; 2:00 p.m., ESPN+		at Sacramento State	W 73–58	12–14 (5–7)	24 – McLaughlin	8 – Jackson	6 – Fort	The Nest (692); Sacramento, CA
February 17, 2024; 5:00 p.m., ESPN+		at Portland State	L 68–83	12–15 (5–8)	14 – Tied	5 – Tied	7 – Lloyd	Viking Pavilion (1,025); Portland, OR
February 22, 2024; 6:00 p.m., ESPN+		Eastern Washington	W 78–71	13–15 (6–8)	21 – Basham	14 – Basham	4 – McLaughlin	Findlay Toyota Court (1,002); Flagstaff, AZ
February 24, 2024; 2:00 p.m., ESPN+		Idaho	L 76–86	13–16 (6–9)	25 – Fort	6 – Lloyd	4 – Lloyd	Findlay Toyota Court; Flagstaff, AZ
February 29, 2024; 2:00 p.m., ESPN+		at Idaho State	W 92–88 ^{2OT}	14–16 (7–9)	33 – Basham	13 – Basham	2 – Tied	Reed Gym (1,546); Pocatello, ID
March 2, 2024; 2:00 p.m., ESPN+		at Weber State	L 58–85	14–17 (7–10)	13 – McLaughlin	7 – Jackson	2 – Tied	Dee Events Center (5,681); Ogden, UT
March 4, 2024; 6:00 p.m., ESPN+		Northern Colorado	L 74–82	14–18 (7–11)	19 – McLaughlin	7 – Basham	7 – Fort	Findlay Toyota Court (1,066); Flagstaff, AZ
Big Sky tournament
March 9, 2024; 8:00 p.m., ESPN+	(7)	vs. (8) Idaho State; First Round	L 60–68	14–19	16 – Jackson	12 – Basham	2 – Tied	Idaho Central Arena; Boise, ID
*Non-conference game. ^{#}Rankings from AP Poll. (#) Tournament seedings in parentheses. All times are in Mountain Time.
