= 2023–24 Sacramento State Hornets men's basketball team =

American college basketball season

2023–24 Sacramento State Hornets men's basketball
- Conference: Big Sky Conference
- Record: 10–24 (4–14 Big Sky)
- Head coach: David Patrick (2nd season)
- Associate head coach: Michael Czepil
- Assistant coaches: Hays Myers; Loren Leath; Tyson Batiste
- Home arena: Hornets Nest (Capacity: 1,012)

2023–24 Big Sky men's basketball standings
	Conf.				Overall
Team	W		L	PCT	W		L	PCT
Eastern Washington	15	–	3	.833	21	–	11	.656
Northern Colorado	12	–	6	.667	19	–	14	.576
Montana	12	–	6	.667	24	–	12	.667
Weber State	11	–	7	.611	20	–	12	.625
Montana State †	9	–	9	.500	17	–	18	.486
Portland State	8	–	10	.444	17	–	15	.531
Northern Arizona	7	–	11	.389	14	–	19	.424
Idaho State	7	–	11	.389	14	–	20	.412
Idaho	5	–	13	.278	11	–	21	.344
Sacramento State	4	–	14	.222	10	–	24	.294
† 2024 Big Sky tournament winner

The 2023–24 Sacramento State Hornets men's basketball team represented California State University, Sacramento in the 2023–24 NCAA Division I men's basketball season. They were led by second-year head coach David Patrick and played their home games at the Hornets Nest as members of the Big Sky Conference.

== Previous season ==
The Hornets finished the season 14–18, 7–11 in conference play to finish in sixth place. In the Big Sky tournament, the Hornets lost their quarterfinals game against Weber State to end their season.

== Roster ==
2023–24 Sacramento State Hornets men's basketball team
Players
Coaches

Pos.	#	Name	Height	Weight	Year	Hometown
G	1	Brandon Betson	6 ft 1 in (1.85 m)	190 lb (86 kg)	Sr	Hercules, California
G	2	Bailey Nunn	6 ft 0 in (1.83 m)	160 lb (73 kg)	Fr	Melbourne, Australia
F	3	Akol Mawein	6 ft 9 in (2.06 m)	220 lb (100 kg)	Sr	Sydney, Australia
G	4	Alex Kovatchev	6 ft 5 in (1.96 m)	185 lb (84 kg)	Fr	Perth, Australia
G	5	Michael Wilson	6 ft 2 in (1.88 m)	190 lb (86 kg)	Fr	Sacramento, California
G	10	Emil Skytta	6 ft 4 in (1.93 m)	205 lb (93 kg)	Fr	Helsinki, Finland
G	11	Quadry Adams	6 ft 4 in (1.93 m)	190 lb (86 kg)	Jr	Piscataway, New Jersey
G	13	Julian Vaughns	6 ft 3 in (1.91 m)	180 lb (82 kg)	Jr	Oakland, California
F	14	Kiir Kiir Chol Deng	6 ft 9 in (2.06 m)	225 lb (102 kg)	So	Juba, South Sudan
F	15	Jacob Holt	6 ft 10 in (2.08 m)	250 lb (113 kg)	Jr	Ladner, British Columbia
G	20	Austin Patterson	6 ft 3 in (1.91 m)	185 lb (84 kg)	Jr	Sonora, California
G	24	Zee Hamoda	6 ft 7 in (2.01 m)	180 lb (82 kg)	Jr	Riffa, Bahrain
C	25	Bowyn Beatty	7 ft 0 in (2.13 m)	220 lb (100 kg)	Fr	Canberra, Australia
F	31	Duncan Powell	6 ft 8 in (2.03 m)	240 lb (109 kg)	So	Dallas, Texas
F	34	Chudi Dioramma	6 ft 10 in (2.08 m)	245 lb (111 kg)	Fr	London, England

Head coach

- David Patrick (Louisiana)

Assistant coach(es)

- Michael Czepil (Nicholls State)
- Hays Myers (LSU)
- Loren Leath (Sacramento State)

Legend

- (C) Team captain
- (S) Suspended
- (I) Ineligible
- (W) Walk-on
- Injured
- Current redshirt

Roster
Last update: November 7, 2023

== Schedule and results ==
Date time, TV	Rank^{#}	Opponent^{#}	Result	Record	High points	High rebounds	High assists	Site (attendance) city, state
Regular season
November 7, 2023*; 7:00 p.m.		at Nevada	L 63–77	0–1	15 – Powell	8 – Powell	4 – Betson	Lawlor Events Center (6,875); Reno, NV
November 10, 2023*; 6:00 p.m., Pac-12 Bay Area		at Stanford	L 73–91	0–2	21 – Hamoda	13 – Powell	5 – Patterson	Maples Pavilion (2,559); Palo Alto, CA
November 14, 2023*; 6:30 p.m., ESPN+		Pacific Union	W 128–66	1–2	20 – Powell	13 – Powell	11 – Nunn	Hornets Nest (810); Sacramento, CA
November 17, 2023*; 4:00 p.m., ESPN+		at Tulane; SoCal Challenge Campus Game	L 57–92	1–3	17 – Powell	13 – Powell	3 – Powell	Devlin Fieldhouse (1,231); New Orleans, LA
November 20, 2023*; 12:00 p.m., FloHoops		vs. Cal State Bakersfield; SoCal Challenge Sand Division Semi-final	L 71–75	1–4	16 – Betson	11 – Powell	3 – Tied	The Pavilion at JSerra (148); San Juan Capistrano, CA
November 22, 2023*; 12:00 p.m., FloHoops		vs. Austin Peay; SoCal Challenge Sand Division 3rd place Game	L 71–74	1–5	19 – Hamoda	7 – Hamoda	4 – Powell	The Pavilion at JSerra (224); San Juan Capistrano, CA
November 26, 2023*; 5:00 p.m., ESPN+		at UC Davis; Causeway Cup	W 69–63	2–5	19 – Powell	7 – Kovatchev	4 – Powell	University Credit Union Center (1,485); Davis, CA
December 2, 2023*; 4:00 p.m., ESPN+		at Long Beach State	L 73–83	2–6	17 – Betson	6 – Tied	4 – Powell	Walter Pyramid (1,815); Long Beach, CA
December 9, 2023*; 2:00 p.m., ESPN+		at Cal State Fullerton	L 60–62	2–7	13 – Powell	9 – Powell	2 – Tied	Titan Gym (765); Fullerton, CA
December 18, 2023*; 6:00 p.m., ESPN+		UC San Diego	L 52–83	2–8	10 – Powell	7 – Powell	4 – Skytta	Hornets Nest (574); Sacramento, CA
December 21, 2023*; 2:00 p.m., ESPN+		Bethesda	W 100–45	3–8	14 – Hamoda	15 – Powell	10 – Powell	Hornets Nest (351); Sacramento, CA
December 28, 2023; 6:00 p.m., ESPN+		at Idaho	L 58–61	3–9 (0–1)	20 – Powell	9 – Mawein	4 – Skytta	ICCU Arena (1,385); Moscow, ID
December 30, 2023; 2:00 p.m., ESPN+		at Eastern Washington	L 61–87	3–10 (0–2)	16 – Hamoda	6 – Tied	2 – Tied	Reese Court (1,431); Cheney, WA
January 3, 2024*; 6:00 p.m., ESPN+		Kansas City; Big Sky-Summit League Challenge	W 67–64	4–10	14 – Patterson	7 – Holt	4 – Tied	Hornets Nest (438); Sacramento, CA
January 6, 2024*; 5:00 p.m.		at St. Thomas; Big Sky-Summit League Challenge	L 50–63	4–11	16 – Powell	6 – Powell	4 – Skytta	Schoenecker Arena (1,306); St. Paul, MN
January 11, 2024; 6:00 p.m., ESPN+		Weber State	W 71–69	5–11 (1–2)	19 – Powell	8 – Powell	5 – Skytta	Hornets Nest (531); Sacramento, CA
January 13, 2024; 6:00 p.m., ESPN+		Idaho State	W 66–64	6–11 (2–2)	17 – Hamoda	8 – Powell	3 – Skytta	Hornets Nest (739); Sacramento, CA
January 18, 2024; 5:00 p.m., ESPN+		at Northern Colorado	L 75–77	6–12 (2–3)	19 – Hamoda	6 – Tied	3 – Hamoda	Bank of Colorado Arena (1,004); Greeley, CO
January 20, 2024; 1:00 p.m., ESPN+		at Northern Arizona	L 61–70	6–13 (2–4)	16 – Patterson	7 – Tied	3 – Skytta	Findlay Toyota Court (967); Flagstaff, AZ
January 25, 2024; 6:00 p.m., ESPN+		Montana State	L 62–70	6–14 (2–5)	17 – Hamoda	10 – Beatty	3 – Nunn	Hornets Nest (1,253); Sacramento, CA
January 27, 2024; 6:00 p.m., ESPN+		Montana	L 67–70	6–15 (2–6)	17 – Hamoda	7 – Powell	4 – Patterson	Hornets Nest (815); Sacramento, CA
February 3, 2024; 4:00 p.m., ESPN+		at Portland State	L 51–58	6–16 (2–7)	11 – Tied	7 – Hamoda	5 – Nunn	Viking Pavilion (827); Portland, OR
February 5, 2024; 6:00 p.m., ESPN+		Idaho	L 45–61	6–17 (2–8)	8 – Tied	6 – Tied	3 – Skytta	Hornets Nest (707); Sacramento, CA
February 8, 2024; 6:00 p.m., ESPN+		at Idaho State	L 40–68	6–18 (2–9)	7 – Beatty	6 – Beatty	2 – Tied	Reed Gym (1,225); Pocatello, ID
February 10, 2024; 6:00 p.m., ESPN+		at Weber State	L 53–58	6–19 (2–10)	17 – Powell	7 – Holt	2 – Powell	Dee Events Center (7,460); Ogden, UT
February 15, 2024; 6:00 p.m., ESPN+		Northern Arizona	L 58–73	6–20 (2–11)	20 – Powell	10 – Powell	4 – Skytta	Hornets Nest (692); Sacramento, CA
February 17, 2024; 2:00 p.m., ESPN+		Northern Colorado	L 75–80	6–21 (2–12)	29 – Patterson	8 – Powell	6 – Wilson	Hornets Nest (651); Sacramento, CA
February 22, 2024; 6:00 p.m., ESPN+		at Montana	L 61–68	6–22 (2–13)	13 – Tied	5 – Tied	2 – Nunn	Dahlberg Arena (2,695); Missoula, MT
February 24, 2024; 6:00 p.m., ESPN+		at Montana State	W 66–63	7–22 (3–13)	20 – Patterson	9 – Kovatchev	3 – Skytta	Worthington Arena (4,002); Bozeman, MT
March 2, 2024; 2:00 p.m., ESPN+		Portland State	W 73–61	8–22 (4–13)	15 – Tied	8 – Holt	8 – Nunn	Hornets Nest (894); Sacramento, CA
March 4, 2024; 6:00 p.m., ESPN+		Eastern Washington	L 88–91	8–23 (4–14)	18 – Hamoda	6 – Mawein	4 – Tied	Hornets Nest (771); Sacramento, CA
Big Sky tournament
March 9, 2024; 4:30 p.m., ESPN+	(10)	vs. (9) Idaho; First round	W 72–64	9–23	25 – Mawein	8 – Beatty	3 – Tied	Idaho Central Arena; Boise, ID
March 10, 2024; 4:30 p.m., ESPN+	(10)	vs. (1) Eastern Washington; Quarter-finals	W 74–69	10–23	19 – Hamoda	9 – Patterson	3 – Patterson	Idaho Central Arena; Boise, ID
March 12, 2024; 5:30 p.m., ESPNU/ESPN+	(10)	vs. (5) Montana State; Semi-finals	L 71–74	10–24	16 – Patterson	7 – Beatty	4 – Patterson	Idaho Central Arena; Boise, ID
*Non-conference game. ^{#}Rankings from AP Poll. (#) Tournament seedings in parentheses. All times are in Pacific Time.
