= 2023–24 Portland State Vikings men's basketball team =

American college basketball season

2023–24 Portland State Vikings men's basketball
- Conference: Big Sky Conference
- Record: 17–15 (8–10 Big Sky)
- Head coach: Jase Coburn (3rd season)
- Assistant coaches: Matt Dunn; Quinton Upshur; Nate Laing
- Home arena: Viking Pavilion

2023–24 Big Sky men's basketball standings
	Conf.				Overall
Team	W		L	PCT	W		L	PCT
Eastern Washington	15	–	3	.833	21	–	11	.656
Northern Colorado	12	–	6	.667	19	–	14	.576
Montana	12	–	6	.667	24	–	12	.667
Weber State	11	–	7	.611	20	–	12	.625
Montana State †	9	–	9	.500	17	–	18	.486
Portland State	8	–	10	.444	17	–	15	.531
Northern Arizona	7	–	11	.389	14	–	19	.424
Idaho State	7	–	11	.389	14	–	20	.412
Idaho	5	–	13	.278	11	–	21	.344
Sacramento State	4	–	14	.222	10	–	24	.294
† 2024 Big Sky tournament winner

The 2023–24 Portland State Vikings men's basketball team represented Portland State University in the 2023–24 NCAA Division I men's basketball season. They were led by third-year head coach Jase Coburn and played their home games at the Viking Pavilion as members of the Big Sky Conference.

== Previous season ==
The Vikings finished the season 12–18, 6–11 in conference play to finish in seventh place. In the Big Sky tournament, the Vikings were defeated by the Northern Colorado in their first-round game to end their season.

== Roster ==
2023–24 Portland State Vikings men's basketball team
Players
Coaches

Pos.	#	Name	Height	Weight	Year	Hometown
G	0	Cole Farrell	6 ft 5 in (1.96 m)	205 lb (93 kg)	Fr	St. Louis, Missouri
G	1	Kelcy Phipps	6 ft 2 in (1.88 m)	175 lb (79 kg)	Fr	Carson, California
G	2	Bobby Harvey	6 ft 4 in (1.93 m)	205 lb (93 kg)	Sr	Chicago, Illinois
F	3	KJ Allen	6 ft 6 in (1.98 m)	255 lb (116 kg)	Sr	Los Angeles, California
C	4	Tre-Vaughn Minott	6 ft 9 in (2.06 m)	260 lb (118 kg)	Jr	Montreal, Quebec
G	5	Isiah Kirby	6 ft 4 in (1.93 m)	205 lb (93 kg)	Sr	Fort Lauderdale, Florida
C	10	Hayden Curtiss	6 ft 11 in (2.11 m)	220 lb (100 kg)	Jr	North Bend, Washington
F	22	Isaiah Johnson	6 ft 6 in (1.98 m)	225 lb (102 kg)	Jr	Torrance, California
G	23	Jorell Saterfield	6 ft 5 in (1.96 m)	190 lb (86 kg)	Sr	Chicago, Illinois
G	24	Ismail Habib	6 ft 0 in (1.83 m)	175 lb (79 kg)	So	Chicago, Illinois
F	25	Hunter Woods	6 ft 6 in (1.98 m)	200 lb (91 kg)	Sr	Pasadena, California
F	44	Kendall Munson	6 ft 8 in (2.03 m)	235 lb (107 kg)	Jr	Seattle, Washington
G	55	Keshaun Saunders	6 ft 5 in (1.96 m)	195 lb (88 kg)	Sr	Brampton, Ontario

Head coach

- Jase Coburn (Arizona State)

Assistant coach(es)

- Matt Dunn (Fort Hays State)
- Quinton Upshur (Northern Arizona)
- Nate Laing (Central Florida)

Legend

- (C) Team captain
- (S) Suspended
- (I) Ineligible
- (W) Walk-on
- Injured
- Current redshirt

Roster
Last update: November 8, 2023

== Schedule and results ==
Date time, TV	Rank^{#}	Opponent^{#}	Result	Record	High points	High rebounds	High assists	Site (attendance) city, state
Regular season
November 6, 2023*; 6:30 p.m., ESPN+		at Air Force	W 62–55	1–0	10 – Saterfield	13 – Johnson	2 – Kirby	Clune Arena (1,417); Colorado Springs, CO
November 9, 2023*; 7:00 p.m., Altitude 2/ESPN+		at UC Santa Barbara	W 82–76	2–0	14 – Saterfield	8 – Johnson	3 – Kirby	The Thunderdome (3,840); Santa Barbara, CA
November 12, 2023*; 2:00 p.m., ESPN+		Linfield	W 70–53	3–0	18 – Allen	7 – Tied	6 – Saterfield	Viking Pavilion (617); Portland, OR
November 17, 2023*; 7:00 p.m., ESPN+		at California Baptist; The Joust	W 66–63	4–0	16 – Johnson	9 – Allen	3 – Habib	Fowler Events Center (2,540); Riverside, CA
November 18, 2023*; 2:30 p.m.		vs. Cal Poly; The Joust	W 73–57	5–0	15 – Allen	10 – Allen	4 – Saterfield	Fowler Events Center (197); Riverside, CA
November 19, 2023*; 2:30 p.m.		vs. St. Thomas (MN); The Joust	L 70–76	5–1	16 – Saterfield	7 – Munson	4 – Habib	Fowler Events Center (123); Riverside, CA
November 28, 2023*; 7:00 p.m., ESPN+		Portland	W 75–74	6–1	18 – Tied	10 – Johnson	4 – Habib	Viking Pavilion (1,483); Portland, OR
December 2, 2023*; 2:00 p.m., P12N		at Washington State	L 61–71	6–2	11 – Tied	7 – Tied	2 – Tied	Beasley Coliseum (2,257); Pullman, WA
December 6, 2023*; 7:00 p.m., ESPN+		Lewis & Clark	W 104–60	7–2	19 – Curtiss	9 – Saterfield	6 – Kirby	Viking Pavilion (573); Portland, OR
December 9, 2023*; 2:00 p.m., ESPN+		George Fox	W 83–77	8–2	25 – Saterfield	11 – Woods	8 – Saterfield	Viking Pavilion (541); Portland, OR
December 15, 2023*; 7:00 p.m., ESPN+		at San Diego	L 65–69	8–3	16 – Johnson	6 – Tied	4 – Tied	Jenny Craig Pavilion (857); San Diego, CA
December 18, 2023*; 7:00 p.m., MWN		Fresno State	W 75–72 ^{OT}	9–3	15 – Allen	8 – Allen	8 – Habib	Save Mart Center (3,003); Fresno, CA
December 28, 2023; 6:00 p.m., ESPN+		at Eastern Washington	L 57–91	9–4 (0–1)	10 – Johnson	4 – Johnson	2 – Farrell	Reese Court (1,306); Cheney, WA
December 30, 2023; 2:00 p.m., ESPN+		at Idaho	W 77–72	10–4 (1–1)	16 – Allen	11 – Allen	4 – Habib	ICCU Arena (1,616); Moscow, ID
January 6, 2024*; 5:00 p.m.		at Kansas City; Big Sky-Summit League Challenge	L 67–83	10–5	16 – Allen	10 – Allen	3 – Allen	Swinney Recreation Center (1,030); Kansas City, MO
January 11, 2024; 7:00 p.m., ESPN+		Idaho State	L 63–69	10–6 (1–2)	16 – Saterfield	6 – Munson	5 – Allen	Viking Pavilion (749); Portland, OR
January 13, 2024; 4:00 p.m., ESPN+		Weber State	W 69–66	11–6 (2–2)	14 – Kirby	14 – Allen	3 – Tied	Viking Pavilion (161); Portland, OR
January 18, 2024; 5:00 p.m., ESPN+		at Northern Arizona	L 65–84	11–7 (2–3)	14 – Habib	7 – Curtiss	2 – Habib	Findlay Toyota Court (825); Flagstaff, AZ
January 20, 2024; 5:00 p.m., ESPN+		at Northern Colorado	L 61–90	11–8 (2–4)	16 – Munson	6 – Munson	2 – Habib	Bank of Colorado Arena (1,254); Greeley, CO
January 25, 2024; 7:00 p.m., ESPN+		Montana	W 72–46	12–8 (3–4)	19 – Habib	8 – Munson	6 – Habib	Viking Pavilion (1,083); Portland, OR
January 27, 2024; 4:00 p.m., ESPN+		Montana State	W 94–91	13–8 (4–4)	26 – Allen	10 – Johnson	7 – Habib	Viking Pavilion (1,197); Portland, OR
February 3, 2024; 4:00 p.m., ESPN+		Sacramento State	W 58–51	14–8 (5–4)	15 – Tied	6 – Tied	7 – Kirby	Viking Pavilion (827); Portland, OR
February 5, 2024; 6:00 p.m., ESPN+		Eastern Washington	L 77–90	14–9 (5–5)	18 – Kirby	7 – Kirby	4 – Kirby	Viking Pavilion (977); Portland, OR
February 8, 2024; 6:00 p.m., ESPN+		at Weber State	L 72–84	14–10 (5–6)	20 – Johnson	7 – Johnson	2 – Saunders	Dee Events Center (5,875); Ogden, UT
February 10, 2024; 5:00 p.m., ESPN+		at Idaho State	L 65–68	14–11 (5–7)	17 – Harvey	10 – Allen	4 – Kirby	Reed Gym (1,435); Pocatello, ID
February 15, 2024; 7:00 p.m., ESPN+		Northern Colorado	W 82–72 ^{OT}	15–11 (6–7)	26 – Harvey	8 – Tied	5 – Habib	Viking Pavilion (643); Portland, OR
February 17, 2024; 4:00 p.m., ESPN+		Northern Arizona	W 83–68	16–11 (7–7)	27 – Allen	9 – Allen	5 – Tied	Viking Pavilion (1,025); Portland, OR
February 22, 2024; 6:00 p.m., ESPN+		at Montana State	L 67–72	16–12 (7–8)	16 – Kirby	7 – Tied	3 – Habib	Worthington Arena (3,571); Bozeman, MT
February 24, 2024; 6:00 p.m., ESPN+		at Montana	L 73–82	16–13 (7–9)	24 – Allen	13 – Allen	3 – Habib	Dahlberg Arena (3,899); Missoula, MT
March 2, 2024; 2:00 p.m., ESPN+		at Sacramento State	L 61–73	16–14 (7–10)	10 – Allen	7 – Saterfield	3 – Farrell	Hornets Nest (894); Sacramento, CA
March 4, 2024; 7:00 p.m., ESPN+		Idaho	W 72–57	17–14 (8–10)	27 – Allen	10 – Tied	3 – Tied	Viking Pavilion (1,007); Portland, OR
Big Sky tournament
March 11, 2024; 7:00 p.m., ESPN+	(6)	vs. (3) Montana; Quarterfinals	L 81-87	17-15	28 – Allen	15 – Allen	2 – Tied	Idaho Central Arena; Boise, ID
*Non-conference game. ^{#}Rankings from AP Poll. (#) Tournament seedings in parentheses. All times are in Pacific Time.
