= 2023–24 Eastern Washington Eagles men's basketball team =

American college basketball season

2023–24 Eastern Washington Eagles men's basketball

Big Sky regular season champions
- Conference: Big Sky Conference
- Record: 21–11 (15–3 Big Sky)
- Head coach: David Riley (3rd season)
- Assistant coaches: Jerry Brown; Pedro Garcia Rosado; Donald Brady; Blake Fernandez; Ben Beauchamp
- Home arena: Reese Court (Capacity: 6,000)

2023–24 Big Sky men's basketball standings
	Conf.				Overall
Team	W		L	PCT	W		L	PCT
Eastern Washington	15	–	3	.833	21	–	11	.656
Northern Colorado	12	–	6	.667	19	–	14	.576
Montana	12	–	6	.667	24	–	12	.667
Weber State	11	–	7	.611	20	–	12	.625
Montana State †	9	–	9	.500	17	–	18	.486
Portland State	8	–	10	.444	17	–	15	.531
Northern Arizona	7	–	11	.389	14	–	19	.424
Idaho State	7	–	11	.389	14	–	20	.412
Idaho	5	–	13	.278	11	–	21	.344
Sacramento State	4	–	14	.222	10	–	24	.294
† 2024 Big Sky tournament winner

The 2023–24 Eastern Washington Eagles men's basketball team represented Eastern Washington University during the 2023–24 NCAA Division I men's basketball season. The Eagles, led by third-year head coach David Riley, played their home games at Reese Court in Cheney, Washington as members of the Big Sky Conference.

== Previous season ==
The Eagles finished the 2022–23 season 23–11, 16–2 in Big Sky play, to finish as Big Sky regular season champions. After clinching the regular season title at 16–0 in conference play with two games remaining, they dropped three straight games, including their matchup against ninth seed Northern Arizona in the quarterfinals of the Big Sky tournament. As a regular season champion who failed to win their conference tournament, the Eagles received an automatic bid to the NIT. They defeated Washington State in the first round, before falling to Oklahoma State in the second round.

== Roster ==
2023–24 Eastern Washington Eagles men's basketball team
Players
Coaches

Pos.	#	Name	Height	Weight	Year	Previous school	Hometown
F	0	Cedric Coward	6 ft 6 in (1.98 m)	206 lb (93 kg)	Jr	Willamette	Fresno, CA
F	1	Vice Zanki	6 ft 8 in (2.03 m)	210 lb (95 kg)	Fr	KK Cedevita Junior	Zagreb, Croatia
G	2	Mason Williams	6 ft 5 in (1.96 m)	170 lb (77 kg)	Fr	O'Dea HS	Seattle, WA
F	4	LeJuan Watts	6 ft 6 in (1.98 m)	233 lb (106 kg)	RS Fr	Bullard HS	Fresno, CA
G	5	Andre Mulibea	6 ft 5 in (1.96 m)	220 lb (100 kg)	Jr	Salt Lake CC	West Valley City, UT
F	10	Ethan Price	6 ft 10 in (2.08 m)	230 lb (104 kg)	Jr	Copleston HS	Bury St Edmunds, England
G	11	Nic McClain	6 ft 3 in (1.91 m)	185 lb (84 kg)	Jr	Daytona State College	Jennings, FL
G	13	Jake Kyman	6 ft 7 in (2.01 m)	213 lb (97 kg)	RS Sr	Wyoming	Aliso Viejo, CA
G	21	Sebastian Hartmann	6 ft 5 in (1.96 m)	215 lb (98 kg)	Fr	Riesen Ludwigsburg	Munich, Germany
F	22	Jackson Seale	6 ft 9 in (2.06 m)	235 lb (107 kg)	Fr	McKinney HS	McKinney, TX
F	31	Casey Jones	6 ft 6 in (1.98 m)	220 lb (100 kg)	Jr	Wasatch Academy	Sammamish, WA
F	32	Dane Erikstrup	6 ft 11 in (2.11 m)	226 lb (103 kg)	Jr	Cal Poly Pomona	Beaverton, OR
F	33	Emmett Marquardt	6 ft 9 in (2.06 m)	220 lb (100 kg)	Fr	Garfield HS	Seattle, WA
G	55	Ellis Magnuson	6 ft 1 in (1.85 m)	195 lb (88 kg)	RS Sr	Borah HS	Boise, ID

Head coach

- David Riley (Whitworth)

Assistant coach(es)

- Jerry Brown (Fresno State)
- Pedro Garcia Rosado (Open)
- Donald Brady (Redlands)
- Blake Fernandez (Western Washington)
- Ben Beauchamp (Western Colorado)

Legend

- (C) Team captain
- (S) Suspended
- (I) Ineligible
- (W) Walk-on
- Injured
- Current redshirt

Roster
Last update: November 9, 2023

== Schedule and results ==
Date time, TV	Rank^{#}	Opponent^{#}	Result	Record	Site (attendance) city, state
Regular season
November 6, 2023*; 6:30 pm, P12N		at Utah	L 66–101	0–1	Jon M. Huntsman Center (7,632); Salt Lake City, UT
November 10, 2023*; 5:00 pm, ESPN+/SECN+		at Ole Miss	L 64–75	0–2	SJB Pavilion (6,665); Oxford, MS
November 12, 2023*; 9:00 am, ESPN+		at Cincinnati	L 73–85	0–3	Fifth Third Arena (3,063); Cincinnati, OH
November 17, 2023*; 6:00 pm, P12N		at Stanford	L 70–95	0–4	Maples Pavilion (2,038); Stanford, CA
November 22, 2023*; 6:00 pm, ESPN+		Walla Walla	W 97–46	1–4	Reese Court (943); Cheney, WA
November 27, 2023*; 7:00 pm, P12N		at Washington State	L 72–82	1–5	Beasley Coliseum (2,208); Pullman, WA
November 29, 2023*; 8:00 pm, P12N		at USC	L 78–106	1–6	Galen Center (3,177); Los Angeles, CA
December 9, 2023*; 3:00 pm		at Air Force	W 73–68	2–6	Clune Arena (2,377); Colorado Springs, CO
December 13, 2023*; 6:00 pm, ESPN+		Portland Bible	W 103–34	3–6	Reese Court (589); Cheney, WA
December 18, 2023*; 7:00 pm, ESPN+		at Cal Poly	W 62–53	4–6	Mott Athletics Center (1,387); San Luis Obispo, CA
December 21, 2023*; 6:00 pm, P12N		at Washington	L 66–73	4–7	Alaska Airlines Arena (7,453); Seattle, WA
December 28, 2023; 6:00 pm, ESPN+		Portland State	W 91–57	5–7 (1–0)	Reese Court (1,306); Cheney, WA
December 30, 2023; 2:00 pm, ESPN+		Sacramento State	W 87–61	6–7 (2–0)	Reese Court (1,431); Cheney, WA
January 3, 2024*; 4:00 pm, ESPN+		at South Dakota; Big Sky–Summit Challenge	W 93–79	7–7	Sanford Coyote Sports Center (1,424); Vermillion, SD
January 6, 2024*; 2:00 pm, ESPN+		North Dakota State; Big Sky–Summit Challenge	W 91–83	8–7	Reese Court (1,192); Cheney, WA
January 13, 2024; 4:00 pm, ESPN+		at Idaho	W 79–58	9–7 (3–0)	ICCU Arena (2,256); Moscow, ID
January 18, 2024; 6:00 pm, ESPN+		at Weber State	W 80–78	10–7 (4–0)	Dee Events Center; Ogden, UT
January 20, 2024; 5:00 pm, ESPN+		at Idaho State	W 79–67	11–7 (5–0)	Reed Gym (1,547); Pocatello, ID
January 25, 2024; 6:00 pm, ESPN+		Northern Colorado	W 77–74	12–7 (6–0)	Reese Court (1,519); Cheney, WA
January 27, 2024; 1:00 pm, ESPN+		Northern Arizona	W 85–70	13–7 (7–0)	Reese Court (1,675); Cheney, WA
February 1, 2024; 6:00 pm, ESPN+		at Montana State	L 60–70	13–8 (7–1)	Worthington Arena (3,012); Bozeman, MT
February 3, 2024; 6:00 pm, ESPN+		at Montana	W 78–65	14–8 (8–1)	Dahlberg Arena (3,842); Missoula, MT
February 5, 2024; 7:00 pm, ESPN+		at Portland State	W 90–77	15–8 (9–1)	Viking Pavilion (977); Portland, OR
February 10, 2024; 4:30 pm, ESPN+		Idaho	W 87–79	16–8 (10–1)	Reese Court (2,174); Cheney, WA
February 15, 2024; 6:00 pm, ESPN+		Idaho State	W 88–82	17–8 (11–1)	Reese Court (1,307); Cheney, WA
February 17, 2024; 2:00 pm, ESPN+		Weber State	L 84–90	17–9 (11–2)	Reese Court (1,786); Cheney, WA
February 22, 2024; 5:00 pm, ESPN+		at Northern Arizona	L 71–78	17–10 (11–3)	Findlay Toyota Court (1,002); Flagstaff, AZ
February 24, 2024; 5:00 pm, ESPN+		at Northern Colorado	W 85–76	18–10 (12–3)	Bank of Colorado Arena (1,893); Greeley, CO
February 29, 2024; 6:00 pm, ESPN+		Montana	W 89–79	19–10 (13–3)	Reese Court (2,179); Cheney, WA
March 2, 2024; 2:00 pm, ESPN+		Montana State	W 108–104 ^{OT}	20–10 (14–3)	Reese Court (2,451); Cheney, WA
March 4, 2024; 6:00 pm, ESPN+		at Sacramento State	W 91–88	21–10 (15–3)	Hornets Nest (771); Sacramento, CA
Big Sky tournament
March 10, 2024; 4:30 pm, ESPN+	(1)	vs. (10) Sacramento State; Quarterfinals	L 69–74	21–11	Idaho Central Arena; Boise, ID
*Non-conference game. ^{#}Rankings from AP poll. (#) Tournament seedings in parentheses. All times are in Pacific.
