= 2023–24 Northern Colorado Bears men's basketball team =

American college basketball season

2023–24 Northern Colorado Bears men's basketball
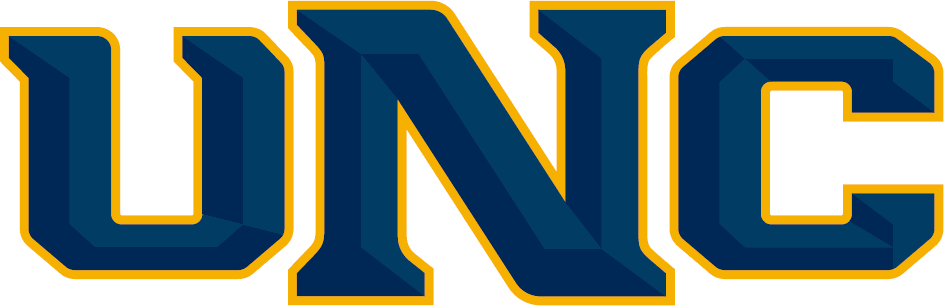

CBI, First Round
- Conference: Big Sky Conference
- Record: 19–14 (12–6 Big Sky)
- Head coach: Steve Smiley (4th season)
- Assistant coaches: Dorian Green; Houston Reed; Brett Cloepfil
- Home arena: Bank of Colorado Arena

2023–24 Big Sky men's basketball standings
	Conf.				Overall
Team	W		L	PCT	W		L	PCT
Eastern Washington	15	–	3	.833	21	–	11	.656
Northern Colorado	12	–	6	.667	19	–	14	.576
Montana	12	–	6	.667	24	–	12	.667
Weber State	11	–	7	.611	20	–	12	.625
Montana State †	9	–	9	.500	17	–	18	.486
Portland State	8	–	10	.444	17	–	15	.531
Northern Arizona	7	–	11	.389	14	–	19	.424
Idaho State	7	–	11	.389	14	–	20	.412
Idaho	5	–	13	.278	11	–	21	.344
Sacramento State	4	–	14	.222	10	–	24	.294
† 2024 Big Sky tournament winner

The 2023–24 Northern Colorado Bears men's basketball team represented University of Northern Colorado in the 2023–24 NCAA Division I men's basketball season. They were led by fourth-year head coach Steve Smiley and played their home games at the Bank of Colorado Arena as members of the Big Sky Conference.

== Previous season ==
The Bears finished the season 12–20, 6–12 in conference play to finish in eighth place. In the Big Sky tournament, the Bears defeated the Portland State in their first-round game, before losing against Montana State in the quarterfinals to end their season.

== Roster ==
2023–24 Northern Colorado Bears men's basketball team
Players
Coaches

Pos.	#	Name	Height	Weight	Year	Hometown
F	0	Saint Thomas	6 ft 7 in (2.01 m)	200 lb (91 kg)	Jr	Omaha, Nebraska
G	1	Mekhi Cameron	6 ft 4 in (1.93 m)	195 lb (88 kg)	Jr	Atlanta, Georgia
G	2	Dejour Reaves	6 ft 0 in (1.83 m)	170 lb (77 kg)	Jr	Syracuse, New York
G	3	Langston Reynolds	6 ft 4 in (1.93 m)	195 lb (88 kg)	So	Denver, Colorado
G	9	Jaron Rillie	6 ft 3 in (1.91 m)	195 lb (88 kg)	Sr	Sydney, Australia
G	10	Radek Homer	6 ft 2 in (1.88 m)	170 lb (77 kg)	Fr	Highlands Ranch, Colorado
G	11	Zach Bloch	6 ft 2 in (1.88 m)	180 lb (82 kg)	Jr	Lawrence, Kansas
G	12	Connor Creech	6 ft 6 in (1.98 m)	200 lb (91 kg)	RS Jr	Hastings, Nebraska
F	14	Brock Wisne	6 ft 9 in (2.06 m)	230 lb (104 kg)	So	Thornton, Colorado
F	15	Juju Ramirez	6 ft 9 in (2.06 m)	220 lb (100 kg)	So	Lawrence, Kansas
F	20	Marcell McCreary	6 ft 4 in (1.93 m)	219 lb (99 kg)	So	Fort Worth, Texas
F	22	Riley Abercrombie	6 ft 9 in (2.06 m)	220 lb (100 kg)	GS	Wollongong, Australia
F	25	Jalen Page	6 ft 5 in (1.96 m)	215 lb (98 kg)	RS Jr	Boulder, Colorado
F	32	Theo Hughes	7 ft 0 in (2.13 m)	260 lb (118 kg)	Sr	Brentwood, England
F	33	Egan Shields	6 ft 10 in (2.08 m)	215 lb (98 kg)	Fr	Ashland, Oregon

Head coach

- Steve Smiley (Northern State)

Assistant coach(es)

- Dorian Green (Colorado State)
- Houston Reed (Northern State)
- Brett Cloepfil (CSU Pueblo)

Legend

- (C) Team captain
- (S) Suspended
- (I) Ineligible
- (W) Walk-on
- Injured
- Current redshirt

Roster
Last update: November 8, 2023

== Schedule and results ==
Date time, TV	Rank^{#}	Opponent^{#}	Result	Record	High points	High rebounds	High assists	Site (attendance) city, state
Exhibition
October 27, 2023*; 6:00 p.m., ESPN+		Midland	W 99–65		18 – Reaves	10 – Thomas	6 – Thomas	Bank of Colorado Arena (–); Greeley, CO
Regular season
November 6, 2023*; 7:30 p.m., ESPN+		Colorado College	W 87–58	1–0	13 – Wisne	8 – Abercrombie	2 – Tied	Bank of Colorado Arena (986); Greeley, CO
November 8, 2023*; 6:00 p.m., ESPN+		Northern New Mexico	W 81–60	2–0	20 – Thomas	12 – Thomas	6 – Thomas	Bank of Colorado Arena (917); Greeley, CO
November 14, 2023*; 6:00 p.m., ESPN+		Colorado State	L 64–83	2–1	20 – Reaves	15 – Thomas	3 – Thomas	Bank of Colorado Arena (2,181); Greeley, CO
November 18, 2023*; 7:00 p.m., ESPN+		at New Mexico State; Cancún Challenge campus game	L 71–76	2–2	16 – Reaves	13 – Thomas	3 – Thomas	Pan American Center (5,656); Las Cruces, NM
November 21, 2023*; 1:00 p.m., FloSports		vs. Chicago State; Cancún Challenge Mayan Division semi-final	W 78–77 ^{OT}	3–2	24 – Reaves	10 – Thomas	4 – Reaves	Hard Rock Hotel (200); Riviera Maya, Mexico
November 22, 2023*; 1:15 p.m., FloSports		vs. Radford; Cancún Challenge Mayan Division championship	L 68–79	3–3	19 – Thomas	7 – Wisne	5 – Rillie	Hard Rock Hotel (–); Riviera Maya, Mexico
November 29, 2023*; 8:00 p.m., ESPN+		at San Diego	L 72–74	3–4	17 – Abercrombie	8 – Tied	6 – Thomas	Jenny Craig Pavilion (603); San Diego, California
December 2, 2023*; 2:00 p.m., ESPN+		Cal State Northridge	W 75–71	4–4	31 – Thomas	9 – Wisne	4 – Thomas	Bank of Colorado Arena (899); Greeley, CO
December 11, 2023*; 10:00 a.m., ESPN+		at Texas A&M-Commerce	L 99–101 ^{2OT}	4–5	30 – Reaves	17 – Thomas	8 – Rillie	The Field House (1,873); Commerce, TX
December 15, 2023*; 6:00 p.m., P12N		at Colorado	L 68–90	4–6	27 – Thomas	9 – Thomas	6 – Rillie	CU Events Center (7,177); Boulder, CO
December 21, 2023*; 2:00 p.m., Mountain West Network		at Air Force	W 83–79	5–6	24 – Thomas	10 – Thomas	6 – Rillie	Clune Arena (1,827); Colorado Springs, CO
December 30, 2023; 2:00 p.m., ESPN+		Northern Arizona	W 92–77	6–6 (1–0)	18 – Rillie	5 – Tied	5 – Reynolds	Bank of Colorado Arena (1,090); Greeley, CO
January 3, 2024*; 6:00 p.m., ESPN+		at North Dakota; Big Sky-Summit League Challenge	W 97–87	7–6	30 – Rillie	12 – Thomas	4 – Rillie	Betty Engelstad Sioux Center (1,365); Grand Forks, ND
January 6, 2024*; 6:00 p.m., ESPN+		Denver; Big Sky-Summit League Challenge	W 86–82	8–6	23 – Thomas	8 – Rillie	10 – Rillie	Bank of Colorado Arena (1,403); Greeley, CO
January 11, 2024; 7:00 p.m., ESPN+		at Montana	W 98–92 ^{OT}	9–6 (2–0)	37 – Thomas	14 – Thomas	5 – Rillie	Dahlberg Arena (2,362); Missoula, MT
January 13, 2024; 6:00 p.m., ESPN+		at Montana State	L 81–90	9–7 (2–1)	27 – Thomas	8 – Thomas	8 – Rillie	Worthington Arena (2,093); Bozeman, MT
January 18, 2024; 6:00 p.m., ESPN+		Sacramento State	W 77–75	10–7 (3–1)	20 – Thomas	9 – Thomas	6 – Rillie	Bank of Colorado Arena (1,004); Greeley, CO
January 20, 2024; 6:00 p.m., ESPN+		Portland State	W 90–61	11–7 (4–1)	20 – Thomas	13 – Thomas	5 – Thomas	Bank of Colorado Arena (1,254); Greeley, CO
January 25, 2024; 7:00 p.m., ESPN+		at Eastern Washington	L 74–77	11–8 (4–2)	26 – Rillie	10 – Thomas	4 – Rillie	Reese Court (1,519); Cheney, WA
January 27, 2024; 3:00 p.m., ESPN+		at Idaho	W 89–68	12–8 (5–2)	20 – Thomas	13 – Thomas	8 – Thomas	ICCU Arena (1,754); Moscow, ID
February 1, 2024; 6:00 p.m., ESPN+		Idaho State	W 91–86 ^{2OT}	13–8 (6–2)	18 – Thomas	10 – Thomas	6 – Rillie	Bank of Colorado Arena (1,209); Greeley, CO
February 3, 2024; 6:00 p.m., ESPN+		Weber State	L 63–82	13–9 (6–3)	29 – Thomas	10 – Thomas	3 – Tied	Bank of Colorado Arena (1,507); Greeley, CO
February 8, 2024; 6:00 p.m., ESPN+		Montana State	W 73–70	14–9 (7–3)	21 – Reaves	8 – Hughes	5 – Thomas	Bank of Colorado Arena (1,055); Greeley, CO
February 10, 2024; 2:00 p.m., ESPN+		Montana	W 87–71	15–9 (8–3)	25 – Reaves	12 – Thomas	7 – Rillie	Bank of Colorado Arena (1,119); Greeley, CO
February 15, 2024; 8:00 p.m., ESPN+		at Portland State	L 72–82 ^{OT}	15–10 (8–4)	27 – Reaves	14 – Thomas	7 – Rillie	Viking Pavilion (643); Portland, OR
February 17, 2024; 3:00 p.m., ESPN+		at Sacramento State	W 80–75	16–10 (9–4)	24 – Reaves	9 – Thomas	5 – Thomas	Hornets Nest (651); Sacramento, CA
February 22, 2024; 6:00 p.m., ESPN+		Idaho	W 76–62	17–10 (10–4)	20 – Thomas	7 – Rillie	8 – Thomas	Bank of Colorado Arena (1,253); Greeley, CO
February 24, 2024; 6:00 p.m., ESPN+		Eastern Washington	L 76–85	17–11 (10–5)	21 – Reaves	9 – Thomas	4 – Rillie	Bank of Colorado Arena (1,893); Greeley, CO
February 29, 2024; 7:00 p.m., ESPN+		at Weber State	L 81–85 ^{OT}	17–12 (10–6)	23 – Rillie	12 – Thomas	7 – Thomas	Dee Events Center (6,018); Ogden, UT
March 2, 2024; 6:00 p.m., ESPN+		at Idaho State	W 81–79	18–12 (11–6)	28 – Thomas	12 – Thomas	8 – Thomas	Reed Gym (1,522); Pocatello, ID
March 4, 2024; 6:00 p.m., ESPN+		at Northern Arizona	W 82–74	19–12 (12–6)	20 – Thomas	10 – Thomas	6 – Tied	Findlay Toyota Court (1,066); Flagstaff, AZ
Big Sky tournament
March 10, 2024; 8:00 pm, ESPN+	(2)	vs. (8) Idaho State; Quarter-finals	L 76–83	19–13	19 – Reaves	8 – Wisne	9 – Thomas	Idaho Central Arena; Boise, ID
CBI
March 24, 2024; 9:00 am, FloHoops	(8)	vs. (9) Cleveland State; First round	L 49–51	19–14	14 – Reynolds	8 – Reynolds	3 – Reynolds	Ocean Center; Daytona Beach, FL
*Non-conference game. ^{#}Rankings from AP Poll. (#) Tournament seedings in parentheses. All times are in Mountain Time.
