= 2023–24 Idaho State Bengals men's basketball team =

Intercollegiate basketball team season

2023–24 Idaho State Bengals men's basketball
- Conference: Big Sky Conference
- Record: 14–20 (7–11 Big Sky)
- Head coach: Ryan Looney (5th season)
- Associate head coach: Joe White
- Assistant coaches: Evan Eustachy; Cam Clark
- Home arena: Reed Gym

2023–24 Big Sky men's basketball standings
	Conf.				Overall
Team	W		L	PCT	W		L	PCT
Eastern Washington	15	–	3	.833	21	–	11	.656
Northern Colorado	12	–	6	.667	19	–	14	.576
Montana	12	–	6	.667	24	–	12	.667
Weber State	11	–	7	.611	20	–	12	.625
Montana State †	9	–	9	.500	17	–	18	.486
Portland State	8	–	10	.444	17	–	15	.531
Northern Arizona	7	–	11	.389	14	–	19	.424
Idaho State	7	–	11	.389	14	–	20	.412
Idaho	5	–	13	.278	11	–	21	.344
Sacramento State	4	–	14	.222	10	–	24	.294
† 2024 Big Sky tournament winner

The 2023–24 Idaho State Bengals men's basketball team represented Idaho State University during the 2023–24 NCAA Division I men's basketball season. The Bengals, led by fifth-year head coach Ryan Looney, played their home games at Reed Gym in Pocatello, Idaho as members of the Big Sky Conference.

The Bengals finished the season 14–20, 7–11 in Big Sky play, to finish in a tie for seventh place. They defeated Northern Arizona and upset #2 seed Northern Colorado, before falling to eventual tournament runner-up Montana in the semifinals of the Big Sky tournament.

== Previous season ==
The Bengals finished the 2022–23 season 11–21, 8–10 in Big Sky play, to finish in fifth place. In the Big Sky tournament, they lost to Montana in the first round.

== Roster ==
2023–24 Idaho State Bengals men's basketball team
Players
Coaches

Pos.	#	Name	Height	Weight	Year	Previous school	Hometown
G	0	Kolton Mitchell	6 ft 1 in (1.85 m)	175 lb (79 kg)	Fr	Lake City High School	Coeur d'Alene, ID
G	3	Maleek Arington	6 ft 3 in (1.91 m)	200 lb (91 kg)	So	Auburn High School	Auburn, WA
G	4	Jaedyn Brown	6 ft 4 in (1.93 m)	175 lb (79 kg)	Fr	Pullman High School	Pullman, WA
G	5	Laolu Kalejaiye	6 ft 0 in (1.83 m)	160 lb (73 kg)	Fr	Middle Brooks Academy	Los Angeles, CA
G	10	Miguel Tomley	6 ft 3 in (1.91 m)	200 lb (91 kg)	Jr	Santa Clara	Surrey, BC
F	12	Turner Livingston	6 ft 4 in (1.93 m)	195 lb (88 kg)	RS Fr	West Valley High School	Spokane, WA
G	13	AJ Burgin	6 ft 3 in (1.91 m)	205 lb (93 kg)	Jr	San Diego High School	San Diego, CA
G	14	Jordan Hansen	6 ft 6 in (1.98 m)	215 lb (98 kg)	So	King's High School	Seattle, WA
F	15	Kiree Huie	6 ft 9 in (2.06 m)	220 lb (100 kg)	Jr	Odessa College	Grayson, GA
F	20	Briggs Ranstrom	6 ft 6 in (1.98 m)	205 lb (93 kg)	RS Fr	Rocky Mountain High School	Eagle, ID
F	21	Isaiah Griffin	6 ft 6 in (1.98 m)	210 lb (95 kg)	Jr	Southeastern Community College	Knightdale, NC
G	22	James Bodily	6 ft 3 in (1.91 m)	200 lb (91 kg)	Fr	North Gem High School	Bancroft, ID
C	25	Brayden Parker	6 ft 8 in (2.03 m)	250 lb (113 kg)	GS	College of Southern Idaho	Preston, ID
F	30	Evan Otten	6 ft 11 in (2.11 m)	220 lb (100 kg)	Fr	Redmond High School	Redmond, OR
F	31	Trent Johnson	6 ft 7 in (2.01 m)	205 lb (93 kg)	Jr	Midland College	Cambridge, ON
C	32	Gavin Gilstrap	6 ft 11 in (2.11 m)	270 lb (122 kg)	Jr	Olney Central College	Spokane, WA
C	44	Louis Stormark	6 ft 9 in (2.06 m)	250 lb (113 kg)	RS So	Get Better Academy	Allerød, Denmark

Head coach

- Ryan Looney (Eastern Oregon)

Assistant coach(es)

- Joe White (Southern Oregon)
- Evan Eustachy (Colorado State)
- Cam Clark (Southwestern (KS))

Legend

- (C) Team captain
- (S) Suspended
- (I) Ineligible
- (W) Walk-on
- Injured
- Current redshirt

Roster
Last update: October 23, 2023

== Schedule and results ==
Date time, TV	Rank^{#}	Opponent^{#}	Result	Record	Site (attendance) city, state
Exhibition
October 28, 2023*; 6:00 p.m.		Simon Fraser	W 80–55		Reed Gym; Pocatello, ID
November 1, 2023*; 7:00 p.m.		Dickinson State	W 88–61		Reed Gym; Pocatello, ID
Regular season
November 6, 2023*; 6:00 p.m., ESPN+		Warner Pacific	W 92–36	1–0	Reed Gym (292); Pocatello, ID
November 10, 2023*; 6:30 p.m.		at St. Thomas	L 53–54	1–1	Schoenecker Arena (1,610); St. Paul, MN
November 12, 2023*; 11:00 a.m., ESPN+		at Iowa State	L 55–86	1–2	Hilton Coliseum (13,529); Ames, IA
November 16, 2023*; 7:00 p.m., ESPN+		Northwest	W 85–51	2–2	Reed Gym (1,013); Pocatello, ID
November 20, 2023*; 2:00 p.m., FloHoops		vs. The Citadel; Campbell Classic	L 61–62	2–3	Gore Arena (51); Buies Creek, NC
November 21, 2023*; 5:00 p.m., FloHoops		at Campbell; Campbell Classic	W 69–55	3–3	Gore Arena (886); Buies Creek, NC
November 28, 2023*; 8:00 p.m., ESPN+		at Pepperdine	L 62–77	3–4	Firestone Fieldhouse (484); Malibu, CA
December 2, 2023*; 6:00 p.m., ESPN+		Lindenwood	W 76–70	4–4	Reed Gym (1,244); Pocatello, ID
December 5, 2023*; 8:00 p.m.		at Fresno State	L 67–79	4–5	Save Mart Center (2,638); Fresno, CA
December 9, 2023*; 6:30 p.m., ESPN+		at Southern Utah	L 74–82	4–6	America First Event Center (1,326); Cedar City, UT
December 21, 2023*; 5:00 p.m., P12N		at Oregon State	L 57–76	4–7	Gill Coliseum (2,576); Corvallis, OR
December 28, 2023; 7:00 p.m., ESPN+		Montana State	L 66–74	4–8 (0–1)	Reed Gym (1,211); Pocatello, ID
December 30, 2023; 6:00 p.m., ESPN+		Montana	L 68–76	4–9 (0–2)	Reed Gym; Pocatello, ID
January 3, 2024*; 7:30 p.m.		at Denver; Big Sky–Summit Challenge	L 82–95 ^{OT}	4–10	Hamilton Gymnasium (634); Denver, CO
January 6, 2024*; 6:00 p.m., ESPN+		Omaha; Big Sky–Summit Challenge	W 63–62	5–10	Reed Gym (2,103); Pocatello, ID
January 11, 2024; 8:00 p.m., ESPN+		at Portland State	W 69–63	6–10 (1–2)	Viking Pavilion (749); Portland, OR
January 13, 2024; 7:00 p.m., ESPN+		at Sacramento State	L 64–66	6–11 (1–3)	Hornets Nest (739); Sacramento, CA
January 18, 2024; 7:00 p.m., ESPN+		Idaho; Battle of the Domes	W 64–59	7–11 (2–3)	Reed Gym; Pocatello, ID
January 20, 2024; 6:00 p.m., ESPN+		Eastern Washington	L 67–79	7–12 (2–4)	Reed Gym (1,547); Pocatello, ID
January 22, 2024; 7:00 p.m., ESPN+		at Montana State	L 70–77	7–13 (2–5)	Worthington Arena (2,449); Bozeman, MT
January 27, 2024; 7:00 p.m., ESPN+		at Weber State	W 74–64	8–13 (3–5)	Dee Events Center (5,445); Ogden, UT
February 1, 2024; 6:00 p.m., ESPN+		at Northern Colorado	L 86–91 ^{2OT}	8–14 (3–6)	Bank of Colorado Arena (1,209); Greeley, CO
February 3, 2024; 2:00 p.m., ESPN+		at Northern Arizona	W 81–79	9–14 (4–6)	Findlay Toyota Court (773); Flagstaff, AZ
February 8, 2024; 7:00 p.m., ESPN+		Sacramento State	W 68–40	10–14 (5–6)	Reed Gym (1,225); Pocatello, ID
February 10, 2024; 6:00 p.m., ESPN+		Portland State	W 68–65	11–14 (6–6)	Reed Gym (1,435); Pocatello, ID
February 15, 2024; 7:00 p.m., ESPN+		at Eastern Washington	L 82–88	11–15 (6–7)	Reese Court (1,307); Cheney, WA
February 17, 2024; 3:00 p.m., ESPN+		at Idaho; Battle of the Domes	L 53–55	11–16 (6–8)	ICCU Arena (1,793); Moscow, ID
February 24, 2024; 6:00 p.m., ESPN+		Weber State	W 80–62	12–16 (7–8)	Reed Gym (2,100); Pocatello, ID
February 29, 2024; 7:00 p.m., ESPN+		Northern Arizona	L 88–92 ^{2OT}	12–17 (7–9)	Reed Gym (1,546); Pocatello, ID
March 2, 2024; 6:00 p.m., ESPN+		Northern Colorado	L 79–81	12–18 (7–10)	Reed Gym (1,522); Pocatello, ID
March 4, 2024; 7:00 p.m., ESPN+		at Montana	L 65–79	12–19 (7–11)	Dahlberg Arena (3,085); Missoula, MT
Big Sky tournament
March 9, 2024; 8:00 p.m., ESPN+	(8)	vs. (7) Northern Arizona; First round	W 68–60	13–19	Idaho Central Arena; Boise, ID
March 10, 2024; 8:00 p.m., ESPN+	(8)	vs. (2) Northern Colorado; Quarterfinals	W 83–76	14–19	Idaho Central Arena; Boise, ID
March 12, 2024; 9:00 p.m., ESPN+	(8)	vs. (3) Montana; Semifinals	L 58–72	14–20	Idaho Central Arena; Boise, ID
*Non-conference game. ^{#}Rankings from AP poll. (#) Tournament seedings in parentheses. All times are in Mountain.
