= 2023–24 Montana State Bobcats men's basketball team =

American college basketball season

2023–24 Montana State Bobcats men's basketball
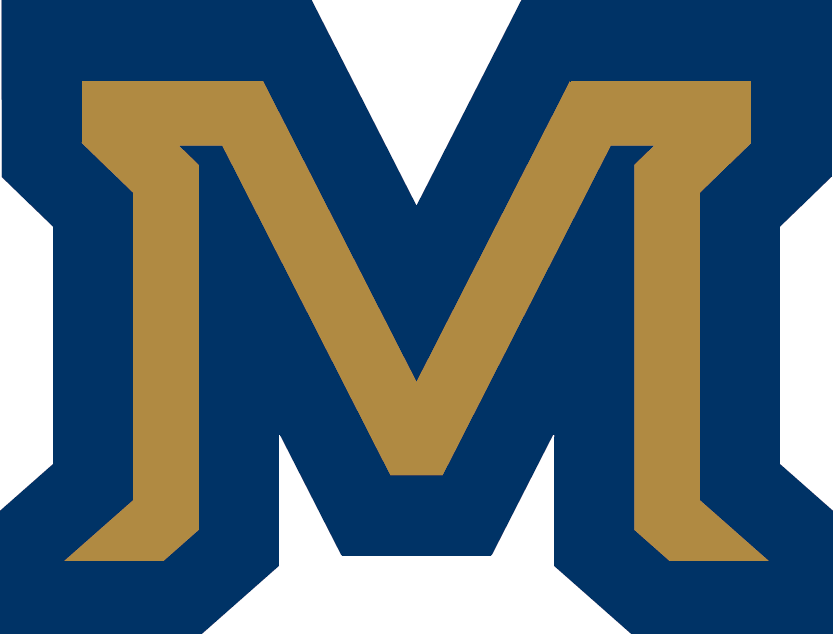

Big Sky tournament champions

NCAA Tournament, First Four
- Conference: Big Sky Conference
- Record: 17–18 (9–9 Big Sky)
- Head coach: Matt Logie (1st season)
- Assistant coaches: Zach Payne; Sam Scholl; Julius Smith
- Home arena: Brick Breeden Fieldhouse

2023–24 Big Sky men's basketball standings
	Conf.				Overall
Team	W		L	PCT	W		L	PCT
Eastern Washington	15	–	3	.833	21	–	11	.656
Northern Colorado	12	–	6	.667	19	–	14	.576
Montana	12	–	6	.667	24	–	12	.667
Weber State	11	–	7	.611	20	–	12	.625
Montana State †	9	–	9	.500	17	–	18	.486
Portland State	8	–	10	.444	17	–	15	.531
Northern Arizona	7	–	11	.389	14	–	19	.424
Idaho State	7	–	11	.389	14	–	20	.412
Idaho	5	–	13	.278	11	–	21	.344
Sacramento State	4	–	14	.222	10	–	24	.294
† 2024 Big Sky tournament winner

The 2023–24 Montana State Bobcats men's basketball team represented Montana State University in the Big Sky Conference during the 2023–24 NCAA Division I men's basketball season. Led by first-year head coach Matt Logie, the Bobcats played their home games on campus at Brick Breeden Fieldhouse in Bozeman, Montana. They finished the season 17–18, 9–9 in Big Sky play, to finish in fifth place. As the No. 5 seed in the Big Sky tournament, they defeated Weber State, Sacramento State and Montana to win the Big Sky tournament championship. As a result, they received the conference's automatic bid to the NCAA tournament for the third consecutive season. As a No. 16 seed in the Midwest region, they lost to Grambling State in the First Four.

== Previous season ==
Montana State finished the 2022–23 regular season at 25–10, 15–3 in Big Sky play, to finish in second place. In the Big Sky tournament, MSU defeated Northern Colorado, Weber State and Northern Arizona to win the tournament championship. As a result, they received the conference's automatic bid to the NCAA tournament as the No. 14 seed in the East region. They lost in the first round to Kansas State.

On April 7, 2023, Bobcats head coach Danny Sprinkle resigned to take the head coaching job at Utah State. Matt Logie, head coach at D-II Point Loma Nazarene, was hired by the Bobcats on April 17.

== Offseason ==
=== Departures ===
Name	Number	Pos.	Height	Weight	Year	Hometown	Reason for departure
Caleb Fuller	0	G	6'5"	200	Senior	Ipswich, England	Graduated
Nick Gazelas	2	G	6'4"	180	Junior	Humble, TX	Transferred to Prairie View A&M
Great Osobor	3	F	6'8"	245	Sophomore	Bradford, England	Transferred to Utah State
Alex Germer	4	F	6'8"	190	RS Freshman	Missoula, MT	Transferred to College of Idaho
Darius Brown II	10	G	6'2"	195	RS Junior	Pasadena, CA	Transferred to Utah State
Jubrile Belo	13	F	6'9"	240	Senior	London, England	Graduated
RaeQuan Battle	21	G	6'5"	190	Junior	Tulalip, WA	Transferred to West Virginia
Luca Colceag	22	F	6'8"	215	Freshman	Bilbao, Spain	Transferred to Eastern Florida State College

=== Incoming transfers ===
Name	Number	Pos.	Height	Weight	Year	Hometown	Previous school
Aiden Gair	0	G	6'6"	198	Junior	Williamsport, PA	Missouri State–West Plains
Jaden Geron	5	G	6'8"	175	Junior	Fresno, CA	Rice
Brian Goracke	21	G	6'5"	210	Junior	Monroe, OR	Point Loma Nazarene
Chika Nduka	23	G/F	6'6"	225	Junior	Seattle, WA	Portland
John Olmsted	15	F/C	6'10"	235	GS Senior	Morenci, AZ	Arizona State
Eddie Turner III	3	G	6'2"	160	Freshman	Seattle, WA	Columbia
Brandon Walker	2	F	6'7"	260	Sophomore	Oak Cliff, TX	UT Arlington

=== 2023 incoming recruits ===
College recruiting information
Name	Hometown	School	Height	Weight	Commit date
Jaqari Miles #23 CG	Stevenson Ranch, CA	West Ranch High School	6 ft 4 in (1.93 m)	180 lb (82 kg)	May 19, 2023
Jaqari Miles #23 CG	Recruit ratings: No ratings found				
Overall recruit ranking:
Note: In many cases, Scout, Rivals, 247Sports, On3, and ESPN may conflict in their listings of height and weight.; In these cases, the average was taken. ESPN grades are on a 100-point scale.; Sources: "2023 Team Ranking". Rivals.

== Roster ==
2023–24 Montana State Bobcats men's basketball team
Players
Coaches

Pos.	#	Name	Height	Weight	Year	Previous school	Hometown
F	0	Aiden Gair	6 ft 5 in (1.96 m)	198 lb (90 kg)	Jr	Williamsport Area HS; Missouri State-West Plains JC	Williamsport, PA
G	1	Patrick McMahon	6 ft 7 in (2.01 m)	190 lb (86 kg)	Jr	Colony HS	Palmer, AK
F	2	Brandon Walker	6 ft 7 in (2.01 m)	250 lb (113 kg)	So	Oak Cliff Faith Family Academy; UT Arlington	Oak Cliff, TX
G	3	Eddie III Turner	6 ft 2 in (1.88 m)	183 lb (83 kg)	GS	Garfield HS; Columbia	Seattle, WA
G	4	Jaqari Miles	6 ft 4 in (1.93 m)	180 lb (82 kg)	Fr	West Ranch HS	Los Angeles, CA
F	5	Jaden Geron	6 ft 8 in (2.03 m)	190 lb (86 kg)	Jr	San Joaquin Memorial HS; Rice	Fresno, CA
G	11	Tyler Patterson	6 ft 8 in (2.03 m)	190 lb (86 kg)	Jr	Mount Si HS; Cal State Northridge	Snoqualmie, WA
G	14	Carter Ash (W)	6 ft 0 in (1.83 m)	165 lb (75 kg)	Jr	Bozeman HS	Bozeman, MT
F	15	John Olmsted	6 ft 10 in (2.08 m)	235 lb (107 kg)	GS	Morenci HS; Arizona State	Morenci, AZ
G	20	Robert III Ford	6 ft 0 in (1.83 m)	180 lb (82 kg)	RS Sr	Jefferson HS; Idaho State	Portland, OR
F	21	Brian Goracke	6 ft 6 in (1.98 m)	210 lb (95 kg)	Jr	Churchill HS; Point Loma	Monroe, OR
F	22	Calum Rutherfurd	6 ft 11 in (2.11 m)	225 lb (102 kg)	Fr	Analy HS	Sebastopol, CA
F	23	Chika Nduka	6 ft 5 in (1.96 m)	225 lb (102 kg)	Jr	Eastside Catholic; Portland	Seattle, WA
G	24	Jed Miller	6 ft 2 in (1.88 m)	175 lb (79 kg)	So	Southern California Academy	Agoura Hills, CA
F	25	Sam Lecholat	6 ft 7 in (2.01 m)	215 lb (98 kg)	Jr	Sheridan HS	Sheridan, WY
F	50	Royce Robinson (W)	6 ft 5 in (1.96 m)	200 lb (91 kg)	GS	Fergus HS	Lewistown, MT

Head coach

- Matt Logie (Lehigh)

Assistant coach(es)

- Zach Payne (Whitworth)
- Sam Scholl (San Diego)
- Julius Smith (William Jessup)

Legend

- (C) Team captain
- (S) Suspended
- (I) Ineligible
- (W) Walk-on
- Injured
- Current redshirt

Roster
Last update: September 21, 2024

== Schedule and results ==
Date time, TV	Rank^{#}	Opponent^{#}	Result	Record	High points	High rebounds	High assists	Site (attendance) city, state
Regular season
November 6, 2023*; 7:00 p.m., ESPN+		Northwest Indian	W 103–63	1–0	15 – Ford III	9 – Lecholat	6 – Turner III	Brick Breeden Fieldhouse (2,274); Bozeman, MT
November 11, 2023*; 2:00 p.m., ESPN+		at Seattle	L 68–71	1–1	18 – Goracke	6 – tied	3 – Lecholat	Redhawk Center (999); Seattle, WA
November 16, 2023*; 9:00 p.m., P12N		at California	W 63–60	2–1	26 – Walker	9 – Ford III	4 – Walker	Haas Pavilion (2,638); Berkeley, CA
November 20, 2023*; 7:00 p.m., ESPN+/SWX		Green Bay; Montana State Multi-Team Event	L 53–54 ^{OT}	2–2	26 – Ford III	13 – Ford III	3 – Lecholat	Brick Breeden Fieldhouse (2,251); Bozeman, MT
November 22, 2023*; 7:00 p.m., ESPN+		UC Riverside; Montana State Multi-Team Event	W 69–68	3–2	20 – Patterson	9 – Ford III	5 – Ford III	Brick Breeden Fieldhouse (2,484); Bozeman, MT
November 26, 2023*; 2:00 p.m., ESPN+		Long Beach State	L 69–75	3–3	20 – Patterson	8 – Ford III	6 – Ford III	Brick Breeden Fieldhouse (2,501); Bozeman, MT
November 30, 2023*; 7:00 p.m., ESPN+		Rocky Mountain	L 62–70	3–4	14 – Goracke	9 – Ford III	6 – Turner III	Brick Breeden Fieldhouse (2,571); Bozeman, MT
December 5, 2023*; 8:00 p.m., P12N		at Washington	L 61–85	3–5	13 – Ford III	6 – Olmsted	3 – Lecholat	Alaska Airlines Arena (6,042); Seattle, WA
December 16, 2023*; 7:00 p.m., ESPN+		SAGU American Indian	W 106–81	4–5	29 – Goracke	9 – Ford III	9 – Turner III	Brick Breeden Fieldhouse (1,586); Bozeman, MT
December 19, 2023*; 7:00 p.m., ESPN+		Southern Utah	W 89–88 ^{OT}	5–5	23 – Goracke	10 – Ford III	4 – Nduka	Brick Breeden Fieldhouse (2,229); Bozeman, MT
December 22, 2023*; 2:00 p.m., ESPN+		Cal State Northridge	L 70–82	5–6	23 – Ford III	9 – Ford III	2 – tied	Brick Breeden Fieldhouse (418); Bozeman, MT
December 28, 2023; 7:00 p.m., ESPN+		at Idaho State	W 74–66	6–6 (1–0)	29 – Goracke	8 – Goracke	3 – Ford III	Reed Gym (1,211); Pocatello, ID
December 30, 2023; 2:00 p.m., ESPN+		at Weber State	L 64–86	6–7 (1–1)	18 – Turner III	5 – Goracke	4 – tied	Dee Events Center (4,886); Ogden, UT
January 3, 2024*; 7:30 p.m., ESPN+		Oral Roberts; Big Sky–Summit League Challenge	L 76–82	6–8	20 – Walker	10 – Ford III	6 – Turner III	Brick Breeden Fieldhouse (2,316); Bozeman, MT
January 6, 2024*; 3:15 p.m., Summit League Network		at South Dakota State; Big Sky–Summit League Challenge	L 61–89	6–9	13 – Goracke	4 – tied	3 – Turner III	Frost Arena (2,167); Vermillion, SD
January 11, 2024; 7:00 p.m., ESPN+		Northern Arizona	W 79–50	7–9 (2–1)	17 – Walker	12 – Ford III	4 – tied	Brick Breeden Fieldhouse (1,608); Bozeman, MT
January 13, 2024; 6:00 p.m., ESPN+		Northern Colorado	W 90–81	8–9 (3–1)	25 – Goracke	12 – Ford III	5 – Walker	Brick Breeden Fieldhouse (2,093); Bozeman, MT
January 20, 2024; 7:00 p.m., ESPN+		Montana	L 77–87	8–10 (3–2)	30 – Ford III	7 – Ford III	3 – tied	Brick Breeden Fieldhouse (6,648); Bozeman, MT
January 22, 2024; 7:00 p.m., ESPN+		Idaho State	W 77–70	9–10 (4–2)	19 – Walker	13 – Ford III	4 – Lecholat	Brick Breeden Fieldhouse (2,449); Bozeman, MT
January 25, 2024; 7:00 p.m., ESPN+		at Sacramento State	W 70–62	10–10 (5–2)	20 – Goracke	7 – Goracke	5 – Ford III	Hornets Nest (1,253); Sacramento, CA
January 27, 2024; 5:00 p.m., ESPN+		at Portland State	L 91–94	10–11 (5–3)	26 – Ford III	8 – Ford III	7 – Turner III	Viking Pavilion (1,197); Portland, OR
February 1, 2024; 7:00 p.m., ESPN+		Eastern Washington	W 70–60	11–11 (6–3)	21 – Ford III	10 – Lecholat	5 – Ford III	Brick Breeden Fieldhouse (3,012); Bozeman, MT
February 3, 2024; 6:00 p.m., ESPN+		Idaho	L 75–81	11–12 (6–4)	15 – Ford III	7 – Ford III	5 – tied	Brick Breeden Fieldhouse (3,761); Bozeman, MT
February 8, 2024; 6:00 p.m., ESPN+		at Northern Colorado	L 70–73	11–13 (6–5)	24 – Ford III	6 – tied	4 – Turner III	Bank of Colorado Arena (1,055); Greeley, CO
February 10, 2024; 3:00 p.m., ESPN+		at Northern Arizona	L 71–76	11–14 (6–6)	22 – Walker	11 – tied	4 – Turner III	Walkup Skydome (709); Flagstaff, AZ
February 17, 2024; 7:00 p.m., ESPN+		at Montana	L 69–88	11–15 (6–7)	18 – Turner III	8 – Ford III	3 – Turner III	Dahlberg Arena (5,704); Missoula, MT
February 22, 2024; 7:00 p.m., ESPN+		Portland State	W 72–67	12–15 (7–7)	27 – Turner III	9 – Walker	5 – Ford III	Brick Breeden Fieldhouse (3,571); Bozeman, MT
February 24, 2024; 6:00 p.m., ESPN+		Sacramento State	L 63–66	12–16 (7–8)	19 – Walker	6 – tied	4 – Turner III	Brick Breeden Fieldhouse (4,002); Bozeman, MT
February 29, 2024; 7:00 p.m., ESPN+		at Idaho	W 62–48	13–16 (8–8)	14 – Ford III	7 – Walker	2 – Ford III	ICCU Arena (1,537); Moscow, ID
March 2, 2024; 3:00 p.m., ESPN+		at Eastern Washington	L 104–108 ^{OT}	13–17 (8–9)	24 – Turner III	8 – tied	9 – Turner III	Reese Court (2,451); Cheney, WA
March 4, 2024; 7:00 p.m., ESPN2		Weber State	W 76–64	14–17 (9–9)	15 – Olmsted	9 – Ford III	6 – Turner III	Brick Breeden Fieldhouse (3,137); Bozeman, MT
Big Sky tournament
March 11, 2024; 5:30 p.m., ESPN+	(5)	vs. (4) Weber State; Quarterfinals	W 91–82	15–17	27 – Ford III	6 – tied	4 – tied	Idaho Central Arena; Boise, ID
March 12, 2024; 6:30 p.m., ESPNU/ESPN+	(5)	vs. (10) Sacramento State; Semifinals	W 74–71	16–17	19 – Ford III	11 – Lecholat	4 – Turner III	Idaho Central Arena; Boise, ID
March 13, 2024; 9:30 p.m., ESPN2/ESPN+	(5)	vs. (3) Montana; Championship	W 85–70	17–17	22 – Ford III	9 – Ford III	4 – Ford III	Idaho Central Arena; Boise, ID
NCAA tournament
March 20, 2024; 4:40 p.m., TruTV	(16 MW)	vs. (16 MW) Grambling State; First Four	L 81–88 ^{OT}	17–18	26 – Ford III	6 – tied	5 – Turner III	UD Arena; Dayton, OH
*Non-conference game. ^{#}Rankings from AP poll. (#) Tournament seedings in parentheses. MW=Midwest region. All times are in Mountain.
