= 2023–24 Montana Grizzlies basketball team =

American college basketball season

2023–24 Montana Grizzlies basketball

CBI, Quarterfinals
- Conference: Big Sky Conference
- Record: 24–12 (12–6 Big Sky)
- Head coach: Travis DeCuire (10th season)
- Associate head coach: Chris Cobb
- Assistant coaches: Jay Flores; Anderson Clarke; DJ Broome; Reuben Williams
- Home arena: Dahlberg Arena

2023–24 Big Sky men's basketball standings
	Conf.				Overall
Team	W		L	PCT	W		L	PCT
Eastern Washington	15	–	3	.833	21	–	11	.656
Northern Colorado	12	–	6	.667	19	–	14	.576
Montana	12	–	6	.667	24	–	12	.667
Weber State	11	–	7	.611	20	–	12	.625
Montana State †	9	–	9	.500	17	–	18	.486
Portland State	8	–	10	.444	17	–	15	.531
Northern Arizona	7	–	11	.389	14	–	19	.424
Idaho State	7	–	11	.389	14	–	20	.412
Idaho	5	–	13	.278	11	–	21	.344
Sacramento State	4	–	14	.222	10	–	24	.294
† 2024 Big Sky tournament winner

The 2023–24 Montana Grizzlies basketball team represented the University of Montana in the 2023–24 NCAA Division I men's basketball season. The Grizzlies, led by tenth-year head coach Travis DeCuire, played their home games at Dahlberg Arena in Missoula, Montana as members of the Big Sky Conference.

== Previous season ==
The Grizzlies finished the 2022–23 season 17–14, 10–7 in Big Sky play to finish in fourth place. They defeated Idaho State in the quarterfinals of the Big Sky tournament, before being upset by #9 seed Northern Arizona in the semifinals.

== Roster ==
2023–24 Montana Grizzlies men's basketball team
Players
Coaches

Pos.	#	Name	Height	Weight	Year	Previous school	Hometown
G	0	Money Williams	6 ft 4 in (1.93 m)	200 lb (91 kg)	Fr	Oakland High School	Oakland, CA
G	2	Chase Henderson	6 ft 0 in (1.83 m)	165 lb (75 kg)	Fr	Hoover High School	Des Moines, IA
G	3	Josh Vazquez	6 ft 3 in (1.91 m)	180 lb (82 kg)	GS	Bishop Montgomery High School	Torrance, CA
G	4	Giordan Williams	6 ft 5 in (1.96 m)	195 lb (88 kg)	RS Sr	Santa Clara	Long Beach, CA
F	5	Jaxon Nap	6 ft 7 in (2.01 m)	208 lb (94 kg)	So	Hazen High School	Renton, WA
G	11	Aanen Moody	6 ft 3 in (1.91 m)	186 lb (84 kg)	GS	Southern Utah	Dickinson, ND
G	12	Brandon Whitney	6 ft 1 in (1.85 m)	183 lb (83 kg)	Sr	Bishop Alemany High School	Mission Hills, CA
F	13	Rhett Reynolds	6 ft 9 in (2.06 m)	210 lb (95 kg)	RS Fr	Shelby High School	Shelby, MT
F	14	Zack Davidson	6 ft 8 in (2.03 m)	224 lb (102 kg)	Fr	Mater Dei High School	Santa Ana, CA
F	21	Laolu Oke	6 ft 8 in (2.03 m)	215 lb (98 kg)	RS Sr	MSU Denver	Aurora, CO
G	22	Adam Shoff	6 ft 1 in (1.85 m)	167 lb (76 kg)	Sr	Shasta College	Redding, CA
G	23	Connor Dick	6 ft 3 in (1.91 m)	194 lb (88 kg)	Fr	Hellgate High School	Missoula, MT
F	24	Dischon Thomas	6 ft 9 in (2.06 m)	230 lb (104 kg)	RS Sr	Colorado State	Durham, NC
F	30	Caden Bateman	6 ft 7 in (2.01 m)	204 lb (93 kg)	RS Fr	Big Sky High School	Missoula, MT
F	32	Te'Jon Sawyer	6 ft 8 in (2.03 m)	252 lb (114 kg)	Jr	City College of San Francisco	San Francisco, CA
F	34	Blake Jones	6 ft 10 in (2.08 m)	225 lb (102 kg)	Jr	George Mason	Canberra, Australia

Head coach

- Travis DeCuire (Montana)

Assistant coach(es)

- Chris Cobb (Menlo)
- Jay Flores (Chico State)
- Anderson Clarke (Concordia–Irvine)
- DJ Broome (Humboldt State)
- Reuben Williams (Willamette)

Legend

- (C) Team captain
- (S) Suspended
- (I) Ineligible
- (W) Walk-on
- Injured
- Current redshirt

Roster
Last update: November 4, 2023

== Schedule and results ==
Date time, TV	Rank^{#}	Opponent^{#}	Result	Record	Site (attendance) city, state
Exhibition
October 21, 2023*; 7:00 pm		Western Washington; Wyatt Grove Fundraiser Game	W 99–68	–	Dahlberg Arena; Missoula, MT
Regular season
November 7, 2023*; 7:00 pm, ESPN+		Northwest Indian	W 107–59	1–0	Dahlberg Arena (2,539); Missoula, MT
November 10, 2023*; 7:00 pm, P12N		at Oregon	L 61–75	1–1	Matthew Knight Arena (7,141); Eugene, OR
November 12, 2023*; 7:00 pm, ESPN+		UC Davis; Basketball Travelers Mike Montgomery Classic	W 78–65	2–1	Dahlberg Arena (2,507); Missoula, MT
November 16, 2023*; 8:00 pm, ESPN+		North Dakota State; Basketball Travelers Mike Montgomery Classic	L 69–78	2–2	Dahlberg Arena (2,653); Missoula, MT
November 24, 2023*; 2:00 pm, ESPN+		at No. 6 Houston	L 44–79	2–3	Fertitta Center (7,451); Houston, TX
November 29, 2023*; 7:00 pm		at Nevada	L 66–77	2–4	Lawlor Events Center (6,918); Reno, NV
December 2, 2023*; 2:00 pm, ESPN+		San Jose State	W 75–58	3–4	Dahlberg Arena (2,524); Missoula, MT
December 5, 2023*; 7:00 pm, ESPN+		MSU–Northern	W 91–67	4–4	Dahlberg Arena (2,335); Missoula, MT
December 8, 2023*; 7:00 pm, ESPN+		Montana Tech	W 88–67	5–4	Dahlberg Arena (3,044); Missoula, MT
December 17, 2023*; 8:00 pm		at San Jose State	W 86–75	6–4	Provident Credit Union Event Center (1,701); San Jose, CA
December 19, 2023*; 7:00 pm, ESPN+		at UC Davis	W 73–61	7–4	University Credit Union Center (941); Davis, CA
December 28, 2023; 7:00 pm, ESPN+		at Weber State	L 63–93	7–5 (0–1)	Dee Events Center (5,095); Ogden, UT
December 30, 2023; 4:00 pm, ESPN+		at Idaho State	W 76–68	8–5 (1–1)	Reed Gym; Pocatello, ID
January 3, 2024*; 6:00 pm, ESPN+		at North Dakota State; Big Sky-Summit Challenge	W 96–86	9–5	Scheels Center (1,592); Fargo, ND
January 6, 2024*; 7:00 pm, ESPN+		South Dakota; Big Sky-Summit Challenge	W 82–63	10–5	Dahlberg Arena (2,864); Missoula, MT
January 11, 2024; 7:00 pm, ESPN+		Northern Colorado	L 92–98 ^{OT}	10–6 (1–2)	Dahlberg Arena (2,362); Missoula, MT
January 13, 2024; 7:00 pm, ESPN+		Northern Arizona	W 90–47	11–6 (2–2)	Dahlberg Arena (2,968); Missoula, MT
January 20, 2024; 6:00 pm, ESPN+		at Montana State	W 87–77	12–6 (3–2)	Worthington Arena (6,648); Bozeman, MT
January 22, 2024; 7:00 pm, ESPN+		Weber State	W 77–62	13–6 (4–2)	Dahlberg Arena (3,163); Missoula, MT
January 25, 2024; 8:00 pm, ESPN+		at Portland State	L 46–72	13–7 (4–3)	Viking Pavilion (1,083); Portland, OR
January 27, 2024; 7:00 pm, ESPN+		at Sacramento State	W 70–67	14–7 (5–3)	Hornets Nest; Sacramento, CA
February 1, 2024; 7:00 pm, ESPN+		Idaho	W 73–70	15–7 (6–3)	Dahlberg Arena; Missoula, MT
February 3, 2024; 7:00 pm, ESPN+		Eastern Washington	L 65–78	15–8 (6–4)	Dahlberg Arena (3,842); Missoula, MT
February 8, 2024; 6:00 pm, ESPN+		at Northern Arizona	W 94–66	16–8 (7–4)	Findlay Toyota Court (308); Flagstaff, AZ
February 10, 2024; 2:00 pm, ESPN+		at Northern Colorado	L 71–87	16–9 (7–5)	Bank of Colorado Arena (1,119); Greeley, CO
February 17, 2024; 7:00 pm, ESPN+		Montana State	W 88–69	17–9 (8–5)	Dahlberg Arena (5,704); Missoula, MT
February 22, 2024; 7:00 pm, ESPN+		Sacramento State	W 68–61	18–9 (9–5)	Dahlberg Arena (2,695); Missoula, MT
February 24, 2024; 7:00 pm, ESPN+		Portland State	W 82–73	19–9 (10–5)	Dahlberg Arena (3,899); Missoula, MT
February 29, 2024; 7:00 pm, ESPN+		at Eastern Washington	L 79–89	19–10 (10–6)	Reese Court (2,179); Cheney, WA
March 2, 2024; 2:00 pm, ESPN+		at Idaho	W 80–57	20–10 (11–6)	ICCU Arena (2,470); Moscow, ID
March 4, 2024; 7:00 pm, ESPN+		Idaho State	W 79–65	21–10 (12–6)	Dahlberg Arena (3,085); Missoula, MT
Big Sky tournament
March 11, 2024; 8:00 pm, ESPN+	(3)	vs. (6) Portland State; Quarterfinals	W 87–81	22–10	Idaho Central Arena; Boise, ID
March 12, 2024; 9:00 pm, ESPN+	(3)	vs. (8) Idaho State; Semifinals	W 72–58	23–10	Idaho Central Arena; Boise, ID
March 13, 2024; 9:30 pm, ESPN2/ESPN+	(3)	vs. (5) Montana State; Championship Game	L 70–85	23–11	Idaho Central Arena; Boise, ID
CBI
March 24, 2024; 11:00 am, FloHoops	(5)	vs. (12) Presbyterian; First round	W 82–79 ^{OT}	24–11	Ocean Center; Daytona Beach, FL
March 25, 2024; 12:00 pm, FloHoops	(5)	vs. (4) Arkansas State; Quarterfinals	L 61–74	24–12	Ocean Center; Daytona Beach, FL
*Non-conference game. ^{#}Rankings from AP Poll. (#) Tournament seedings in parentheses. All times are in Mountain.
