= Gabilan Acres, California =

Unincorporated community in California, United States

Gabilan Acres
- Unincorporated community
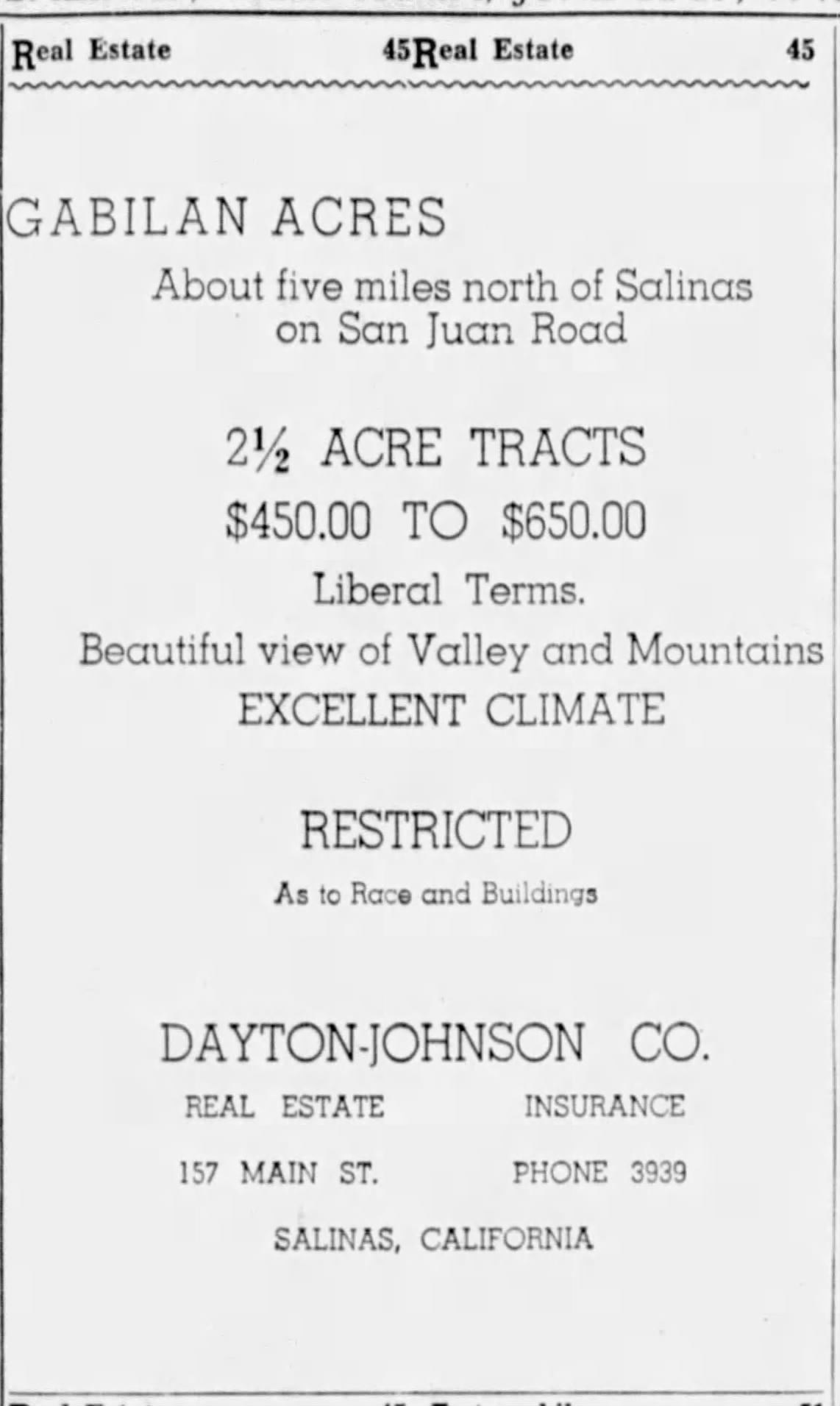
- Gabilan Acres - Dayton-Johnson Co. - 1940 - "Restricted as to race and buildings"

- Location in California Gabilan Acres (the United States)
- Coordinates: 36°45′19″N 121°37′10″W
- Country: United States
- State: California
- County: Monterey
- Elevation: 203 ft (62 m)

Gabilan Acres (Gabilán, Spanish for "Sparrow hawk") is an unincorporated community in Monterey County, California, United States. It is located on San Juan Grade Road, northeast of Salinas and Bolsa Knolls and 6.5 miles (10 km) west of Fremont Peak, at an elevation of 203 feet (62 m). The Gabilan Acres subdivision was laid out in 1940 and planned as a race-restricted community. By 1948 the neighborhood had 48 homeowners and children attended school in nearby Santa Rita. In 1964, The Californian newspaper recognized Gabilan as one of nine unincorporated subdivisions outside Salinas, along with Santa Rita, Oak Park, San Juan Acres, Bolsa Knolls, Spreckels, Pedrazzi, Pine Canyon, and San Benancio. In 1998 an 11-year-old girl was killed in her home in Gabilan Acres.
