= Alisal, Salinas, California =

Alisal
- Neighborhood of Salinas
- Location in California
- Coordinates: 36°40′45″N 121°37′04″W
- Country: United States
- State: California
- County: Monterey County
- City: Salinas
- Elevation: 89 ft (27 m)

Alisal (/ˈælɪsæl/; Spanish for "Sycamore grove"), sometimes called East Salinas, is a neighborhood of Salinas in Monterey County, California. It is located east of downtown, at an elevation of 89 feet (27 m). The unincorporated community of Alisal was annexed to Salinas in 1963. Alisal is home to Alisal High School.

The first post office at Alisal opened in 1866, closed in 1869, with service transferred to Gabilan. The East Salinas post office opened in 1940, was renamed Alisal in 1947, renamed back to East Salinas in 1949, and back to Alisal in 1950. Alisal's ZIP Code is 93905.
