= Gabilan, California =

Gabilan
- Former settlement
- Location in California
- Coordinates: 36°32′48″N 121°29′39″W
- Country: United States
- State: California
- County: Monterey
- Elevation: 112 ft (34 m)

Gabilan (Spanish: Gabilán, meaning "Sparrow hawk") was a former settlement in Monterey County, California, United States. It was located on the Southern Pacific Railroad, 4 miles (6.4 km) northwest of Gonzales, at an elevation of 112 feet (34 m), and was situated in the foothills of the Gabilan Range. In Spanish, gavilán (gabilán is an older spelling) means "sparrow hawk". Hawks, especially the red-tailed hawk, are common in the area.

A post office operated at Gabilan (having been transferred from Alisal) from 1869 to 1883, and from 1898 to 1900.
