= Alisal High School =

Coordinates: 36.684792°N 121.600634°W

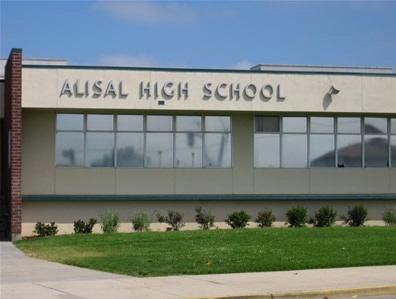

Location
- 777 Williams Road; Alisal, Salinas, California; United States

Information
- Type: Public secondary
- Motto: Academics, Honor, Solidarity
- Founded: 1965
- School district: Salinas Union High School District
- CEEB code: 605-332
- Principal: Christina Perez
- Teaching staff: 119.53 (FTE)
- Grades: 9–12
- Enrollment: 2,742 (2024-2025)
- Student to teacher ratio: 22.94
- Campus type: Rural / Suburban
- Colors: Forrest Green, black, white
- Mascot: Trojan
- Yearbook: The Trojan
- Website: https://ahs.salinasuhsd.org/

Alisal High School is an American public high school opened in 1965 and located in Salinas, California. Alisal's school colors are green, black and white. Their mascot is Tommy the Trojan.

== Incidents ==
On October 1st 2010, A 15-year-old student Jose Daniel Cisneros was killed after being shot several times on an athletic field at Alisal High School while walking to school. Police said that the shooting was gang-related.

== Sports ==
Alisal High School offers many athletic opportunities. Cross Country Football Girls Golf Girls Tennis Girls Volleyball Gymnastics Water Polo Cheer & Dance Basketball Soccer Wrestling Cheer & Dance Baseball Boys Golf Softball Boys Tennis Swimming Track & Field Boys Volleyball Among these, the boys' varsity soccer team of 2009–2010, part of division 1 of the Central Coast Section (CCS), won the CCS award for the first time in various years. The team won it for the second time during the 2012–2013 season finishing ranked #1 in the state and #2 in the nation. The girls varsity basketball team known as the lady trojans became gabilan league champions in 2024 they finished an historic season with a record of 24 wins and 4 losses becoming State and League Champions.In 2026 The lady Trojans reclaimed the gabilan league champion title once again finishing another amazing season with 22 wins and 2 losses qualifying for the CCS open division being among the top team schools in the entire CCS for the first time in history.
