= 2025–26 Denver Pioneers men's basketball team =

American college basketball season

2025–26 Denver Pioneers men's basketball
- Conference: Summit League
- Record: 15–17 (8–8 Summit)
- Head coach: Tim Bergstraser (1st season)
- Associate head coach: Spenser Bland
- Assistant coaches: Kyle Heikkinen; Abe Woldeslassie
- Home arena: Hamilton Gymnasium

2025–26 Summit League men's basketball standings
	Conf.				Overall
Team	W		L	PCT	W		L	PCT
North Dakota State	14	–	2	.875	25	–	7	.781
St. Thomas	12	–	4	.750	24	–	8	.750
North Dakota	10	–	6	.625	17	–	16	.515
South Dakota	8	–	8	.500	16	–	16	.500
Omaha	8	–	8	.500	16	–	16	.500
Denver	8	–	8	.500	15	–	17	.469
South Dakota State	7	–	9	.438	14	–	18	.438
Oral Roberts	4	–	12	.250	10	–	23	.303
Kansas City	1	–	15	.063	4	–	27	.129
† 2026 Summit League tournament winner As of March 6, 2026

The 2025–26 Denver Pioneers men's basketball team represented the University of Denver in the 2025–26 NCAA Division I men's basketball season. The Pioneers were led by first-year head coach Tim Bergstraser, who was hired as Denver's next coach after previous coach Jeff Wulbrun was fired after the 2024–25 season. The Pioneers played home games at Hamilton Gymnasium in Denver, Colorado as members of the Summit League.

This also served as the Pioneers' final season in the Summit League after it was announced on October 31, 2025, that Denver will be joining the West Coast Conference starting on July 1, 2026.

The Pioneers finished the regular season 15–16 overall, and 8–8 in the Summit League to finish in sixth place. In the Summit League tournament, they lost to North Dakota in the quarterfinals.

== Previous season ==
The Pioneers finished the 2024–25 season 11–21, 5–11 in Summit League play, to finish in seventh place. In the Summit League tournament, the Pioneers would fall to St. Thomas in the quarterfinal round.

== Roster ==
2025–26 Denver Pioneers men's basketball team
Players
Coaches

Pos.	#	Name	Height	Weight	Year	Previous school	Hometown
F	0	Jeremiah Burke	6 ft 7 in (2.01 m)	220 lb (100 kg)	GS	North Dakota State	Milwaukee, WI
F	1	Shaun Wysocki	6 ft 7 in (2.01 m)	195 lb (88 kg)	So	Minnesota State–Moorhead	Rochester, MN
G	2	Devin Carney	6 ft 1 in (1.85 m)	185 lb (84 kg)	RS Jr	Duquesne	Butler, PA
G	4	Corleone Dandridge	6 ft 5 in (1.96 m)	185 lb (84 kg)	RS Fr	Minnesota State–Moorhead	Milwaukee, WI
F	5	Logan Kinsey	6 ft 6 in (1.98 m)	215 lb (98 kg)	Sr	Minnesota State–Moorhead	Blaine, MN
G	6	Trajan Thompson	6 ft 6 in (1.98 m)	190 lb (86 kg)	Fr	Providence Day School	Charlotte, NC
G	7	Zane Nelson	6 ft 4 in (1.93 m)	185 lb (84 kg)	GS	Missouri Western State	Birmingham, AL
G	8	Julius Rollins	6 ft 7 in (2.01 m)	210 lb (95 kg)	GS	Western Illinois	Chicago, IL
G	11	Kaden Holdbrook	6 ft 2 in (1.88 m)	190 lb (86 kg)	Jr	Macalester (MN)	Palo Alto, CA
G	13	Josh Lee	6 ft 3 in (1.91 m)	200 lb (91 kg)	Sr	Itawamba CC	Canton, MI
G	20	Carson Johnson	6 ft 1 in (1.85 m)	180 lb (82 kg)	So	Minnesota State–Moorhead	Ankeny, IA
F	21	Didier Maleng	6 ft 9 in (2.06 m)	225 lb (102 kg)	Jr	South Plains	Kinshasa, Congo
F	30	Loch Cunningham	6 ft 5 in (1.96 m)	200 lb (91 kg)	So	Westlake Chapparal High School	Austin, TX
F	32	Gabe Oldham	6 ft 8 in (2.03 m)	230 lb (104 kg)	Jr	Pima CC	Spanish Fork, UT

Head coach

- Tim Bergstraser (St. Cloud State)

Assistant coach(es)

- Spenser Bland (MSU Moorhead)
- Kyle Heikkinen (UW–Whitewater)
- Abe Woldeslassie

Legend

- (C) Team captain
- (S) Suspended
- (I) Ineligible
- (W) Walk-on
- Injured
- Current redshirt

Roster
Last update: November 1, 2025

== Schedule and results ==
Date time, TV	Rank^{#}	Opponent^{#}	Result	Record	Site (attendance) city, state
Exhibition
October 26, 2025*; 12:00 p.m.		at Montana	L 77–89	–	Dahlberg Arena; Missoula, MT
Non-conference regular season
November 3, 2025*; 8:00 p.m., ESPN+		at Seattle	L 73–84	0–1	Redhawk Center (957); Seattle, WA
November 6, 2025*; 8:00 p.m., BTN		at Washington	L 70–84	0–2	Hec Edmundson Pavilion (5,134); Seattle, WA
November 9, 2025*; 1:00 p.m., ESPN+		at Montana State	W 75–73	1–2	Brick Breeden Fieldhouse (2,591); Bozeman, MT
November 15, 2025*; 12:00 p.m., Summit League Network		UTSA	L 79–84	1–3	Hamilton Gymnasium (1,456); Denver, CO
November 21, 2025*; 7:00 p.m., Mountain West Network		at Colorado State	W 83–81	2–3	Moby Arena (5,900); Fort Collins, CO
November 24, 2025*; 8:30 p.m., CBSSN		at No. 2 Arizona	L 73–103	2–4	McKale Center (13,556); Tucson, AZ
November 26, 2025*; 6:30 p.m., Mountain West Network		at Wyoming	L 59–101	2–5	Arena-Auditorium (3,180); Laramie, WY
December 3, 2025*; 7:00 p.m., Altitude 2/SLN		Eastern Washington; Big Sky–Summit League Challenge	W 93–89	3–5	Hamilton Gymnasium (500); Denver, CO
December 6, 2025*; 4:00 p.m., ESPN+		at Idaho State; Big Sky–Summit League Challenge	L 79–93	3–6	Reed Gym (1,215); Pocatello, ID
December 9, 2025*; 7:00 p.m., SLN		Colorado Christian	W 95–59	4–6	Hamilton Gymnasium (418); Denver, CO
December 11, 2025*; 7:00 p.m., SLN		Alaska Anchorage	W 97–61	5–6	Hamilton Gymnasium (656); Denver, CO
December 13, 2025*; 2:00 p.m., Altitude/SLN		Cal State Fullerton	L 86–105	5–7	Hamilton Gymnasium (861); Denver, CO
December 16, 2025*; 7:00 p.m., SLN		UCCS	W 129–93	6–7	Hamilton Gymnasium (566); Denver, CO
December 20, 2025*; 1:00 p.m., ESPN+		at Northern Colorado	W 86–79	7–7	Bank of Colorado Arena (1,352); Greeley, CO
December 22, 2025*; 1:00 p.m., ESPN+		at Tulsa	L 85–90	7–8	Reynolds Center (3,595); Tulsa, OK
Summit League regular season
December 31, 2025; 2:00 p.m., SLN		Kansas City	W 87–74	8–8 (1–0)	Hamilton Gymnasium (984); Denver, CO
January 3, 2026; 11:00 a.m., SLN		at St. Thomas	L 88–92	8–9 (1–1)	Lee and Penny Anderson Arena (2,541); St. Paul, MN
January 8, 2026; 6:00 p.m., SLN		at South Dakota State	L 79–87	8–10 (1–2)	First Bank and Trust Arena (2,127); Brookings, SD
January 10, 2026; 12:00 p.m., SLN		at South Dakota	L 72–82	8–11 (1–3)	Sanford Coyote Sports Center (1,291); Vermillion, SD
January 14, 2026; 7:00 p.m., Altitude 2/SLN		Oral Roberts	W 98–87	9–11 (2–3)	Hamilton Gymnasium (1,008); Denver, CO
January 22, 2026; 7:00 p.m., Altitude 2/SLN		North Dakota State	L 77–82	9–12 (2–4)	Hamilton Gymnasium (1,839); Denver, CO
January 24, 2026; 2:00 p.m., SLN		North Dakota	L 86–93	9–13 (2–5)	Hamilton Gymnasium (1,137); Denver, CO
January 28, 2026; 6:00 p.m., SLN		at Kansas City	W 69–61	10–13 (3–5)	Swinney Recreation Center (692); Kansas City, MO
January 31, 2026; 2:00 p.m., SLN		Omaha	L 82–84	10–14 (3–6)	Hamilton Gymnasium (1,037); Denver, CO
February 5, 2026; 6:00 p.m., SLN		at North Dakota State	W 78–71	11–14 (4–6)	Scheels Center (1,687); Fargo, ND
February 7, 2026; 12:00 p.m., SLN		at North Dakota	W 98–79	12–14 (5–6)	Betty Engelstad Sioux Center (2,238); Grand Forks, ND
February 12, 2026; 7:00 p.m., SLN		South Dakota State	W 79–61	13–14 (6–6)	Hamilton Gymnasium (1,047); Denver, CO
February 15, 2026; 11:00 a.m., CBSSN		at Omaha	L 76–83	13–15 (6–7)	Baxter Arena (3,291); Omaha, NE
February 19, 2026; 7:00 p.m., Altitude 2/SLN		South Dakota	W 90–70	14–15 (7–7)	Hamilton Gymnasium (1,172); Denver, CO
February 21, 2026; 4:00 p.m., SLN		St. Thomas	W 82–80	15–15 (8–7)	Hamilton Gymnasium (1,594); Denver, CO
February 26, 2026; 6:00 p.m., SLN		at Oral Roberts	L 80–102	15–16 (8–8)	Mabee Center (2,435); Tulsa, OK
Summit League tournament
March 6, 2026*; 7:35 p.m., SLN	(6)	vs. (3) North Dakota; Quarterfinal	L 67–83	15–17	Denny Sanford Premier Center (6,723); Sioux Falls, SD
*Non-conference game. ^{#}Rankings from AP poll. (#) Tournament seedings in parentheses. All times are in Mountain.
