= 2025–26 Colorado State Rams men's basketball team =

American college basketball season

2025–26 Colorado State Rams men's basketball

NIT, First Round
- Conference: Mountain West Conference
- Record: 21–13 (11–9 MW)
- Head coach: Ali Farokhmanesh (1st season)
- Assistant coaches: Ken DeWeese (2nd season); Jimmie Foster (1st season); Cole Gentry (1st season); Tim Shelton (3rd season)
- Home arena: Moby Arena (Capacity: 8,083)

2025–26 Mountain West Conference men's basketball standings
	Conf.				Overall
Team	W		L	PCT	W		L	PCT
Utah State †	15	–	5	.750	28	–	6	.824
San Diego State	14	–	6	.700	22	–	11	.667
New Mexico	13	–	7	.650	24	–	10	.706
Grand Canyon	13	–	7	.650	20	–	12	.625
Nevada	12	–	8	.600	23	–	12	.657
Boise State	12	–	8	.600	20	–	12	.625
Colorado State	11	–	9	.550	21	–	13	.618
UNLV	11	–	9	.550	18	–	16	.529
Wyoming	9	–	11	.450	18	–	15	.545
Fresno State	7	–	13	.350	13	–	19	.406
San Jose State	3	–	17	.150	9	–	24	.273
Air Force	0	–	20	.000	3	–	29	.094
† 2026 Mountain West tournament winner As of March 18, 2026

The 2025–26 Colorado State Rams men's basketball team represented Colorado State University during the 2025–26 NCAA Division I men's basketball season. The Rams are led by first-year head coach Ali Farokhmanesh and played their home games at Moby Arena in Fort Collins, Colorado as a member of the Mountain West Conference.

The season marked Colorado State's final season as members of the Mountain West Conference before joing the Pac-12 Conference on July 1, 2026.

== Previous season ==
The Rams finished the 2025-26 season 26–10, 16–5 in Mountain West play to finish second place. They defeated Nevada, Utah State, and Boise State in the Mountain West tournament win their first tournament championship since 2003. As a result, they received the conference's automatic bid to the NCAA tournament as the No. 12 seed in the West region. The Rams upset the Memphis in the first round before losing to Maryland.

A day after the season's conclusion, head coach Niko Medved left to take the same position at his alma mater, Minnesota. On March 26, 2025, the school named top assistant coach Ali Farokhmanesh the team's new head coach.

== Offseason ==
=== Departures ===
Name	Number	Pos.	Height	Weight	Year	Hometown	Reason for departure
Kyan Evans	0	G	6'2"	175	Sophomore	Kansas City, MO	Transferred to North Carolina
Jaylen Crocker-Johnson	8	F	6'8"	230	Sophomore	San Antonio, TX	Transferred to Minnesota
Nique Clifford	10	G	6'6"	200	Graduate	Colorado Springs, CO	Drafted 24th overall in the 2025 NBA Draft by the Oklahoma City Thunder, traded to the Sacramento Kings
Keshawn Williams	11	G	6'4"	175	Graduate	Chicago Heights, IL	Transferred to Iona
Bowen Born	13	G	5'11"	170	Graduate	Norwalk, IA	Out of eligibility
Luke Murphy	14	G	6'2"	170	(redshirt) Junior	Calabasas, CA	Entered transfer portal
Jalen Lake	15	G	6'4"	190	Senior	Waxahachie, TX	Out of eligibility
Ethan Morton	25	G	6'7"	215	Graduate	Butler, PA	Out of eligibility
Jaden Steppe	44	F	6'8"	220	Freshman	Tualatin, OR	Transferred to Montana State

=== Incoming transfers ===
Name	Number	Pos.	Height	Weight	Year	Hometown	Previous college
Carey Booth	0	F	6'10"	215	Junior	Englewood, CO	Illinois
Josh Pascarelli	1	G	6'3"	195	Junior	Cambria Heights, NY	Marist
Brandon Rechsteiner	2	G	6'1"	190	Junior	Acworth, GA	Virginia Tech
Jase Butler	4	G	6'4"	185	Sophomore	San Anselmo, CA	Washington
Augustinas Kiudulas	11	F	6'8"	215	Senior	Vilnius, Lithuania	VMI
Jevin Muniz	55	G	6'6"	190	Senior	Bethlehem, PA	Florida Gulf Coast

=== 2025 recruiting class ===
College recruiting information
Name	Hometown	School	Height	Weight	Commit date
JoJo McIver; PG	Killeen, TX	Ellison HS	6 ft 2 in (1.88 m)	165 lb (75 kg)	Nov 13, 2024
JoJo McIver; PG	Recruit ratings: Scout: Rivals: 247Sports: ESPN: (NR)				
Docker Tedeschi; PF	Benton, IL	Benton Consolidated HS	6 ft 9 in (2.06 m)	190 lb (86 kg)	Jun 25, 2024
Docker Tedeschi; PF	Recruit ratings: Scout: Rivals: 247Sports: ESPN: (NR)				
Overall recruit ranking: Scout: – Rivals: –
Note: In many cases, Scout, Rivals, 247Sports, On3, and ESPN may conflict in their listings of height and weight.; In these cases, the average was taken. ESPN grades are on a 100-point scale.; Sources: "2025 Colorado State Basketball Recruiting Commits". Scout.; "Scout.com Team Recruiting Rankings". Scout.; "2025 Team Ranking". Rivals.

== Roster ==
2025–26 Colorado State Rams men's basketball team
Players
Coaches

Pos.	#	Name	Height	Weight	Year	Previous school	Hometown
F	0	Carey Booth	6 ft 10 in (2.08 m)	215 lb (98 kg)	Jr	Illinois	Englewood, Colorado
G	1	Josh Pascarelli	6 ft 3 in (1.91 m)	195 lb (88 kg)	Jr	Marist	Cambria Heights, New York
G	2	Brandon Rechsteiner	6 ft 1 in (1.85 m)	190 lb (86 kg)	Jr	Virginia Tech	Acworth, Georgia
G	3	Darnez Slater	6 ft 3 in (1.91 m)	175 lb (79 kg)	RS Fr	Eleanor Roosevelt HS	Eastvale, California
G	4	Jase Butler	6 ft 4 in (1.93 m)	185 lb (84 kg)	So	Washington	San Anselmo, California
F	5	Jon Mekonnen	6 ft 8 in (2.03 m)	195 lb (88 kg)	RS Fr	Eastview HS	Eagan, Minnesota
G	8	JoJo McIver	6 ft 3 in (1.91 m)	185 lb (84 kg)	Fr	Ellison HS	Killeen, Texas
F	11	Augustinas Kiudulas	6 ft 8 in (2.03 m)	215 lb (98 kg)	Jr	VMI	Vilnius, Lithuania
F	21	Rashaan Mbemba	6 ft 7 in (2.01 m)	250 lb (113 kg)	Jr	Borgi St. Polten	Vienna, Austria
C	23	Nikola Djapa	6 ft 11 in (2.11 m)	235 lb (107 kg)	So	Long Island	Belgrade, Serbia
F	30	Charlie Dortch	6 ft 7 in (2.01 m)	235 lb (107 kg)	RS So	Fort Lewis	Fort Collins, Colorado
F	35	Kyle Jorgensen	6 ft 9 in (2.06 m)	225 lb (102 kg)	So	Washburn HS	Minneapolis, Minnesota
F	41	Docker Tedeschi	6 ft 9 in (2.06 m)	190 lb (86 kg)	Fr	Benton Consolidated HS	Benton, Illinois
G	55	Jevin Muniz	6 ft 6 in (1.98 m)	190 lb (86 kg)	Sr	Florida Gulf Coast	Bethlehem, Pennsylvania

Head coach

- Ali Farokhmanesh (Northern Iowa)

Assistant coach(es)

- Ken DeWeese (Mary Hardin–Baylor)
- Jimmie Foster (South Dakota)
- Cole Gentry (Wright State)
- Tim Shelton (San Diego State)

Legend

- (C) Team captain
- (S) Suspended
- (I) Ineligible
- (W) Walk-on
- Injured
- Current redshirt

Roster
Last update: 2025-10-22

== Schedule and results ==
Date time, TV	Rank^{#}	Opponent^{#}	Result	Record	High points	High rebounds	High assists	Site (attendance) city, state
Exhibition
October 25, 2025*; 5:00 p.m., Jays Video		at No. 23 Creighton	L 64–76		14 – Rechsteiner	9 – Booth	3 – Tied	CHI Health Center Omaha (15,271); Omaha, NE
Non-conference regular season
November 3, 2025*; 7:00 p.m., MW Network		Incarnate Word	W 98–64	1–0	19 – Rechsteiner	9 – Jorgensen	6 – Rechsteiner	Moby Arena (4,679); Fort Collins, CO
November 9, 2025*; 4:00 p.m., MW Network		Omaha	W 97–74	2–0	25 – Jorgensen	11 – Booth	4 – Tied	Moby Arena (6,405); Fort Collins, CO
November 12, 2025*; 7:00 p.m., MW Network		Cal Poly	W 93–79	3–0	22 – Pascarelli	10 – Booth	7 – Muniz	Moby Arena (5,908); Fort Collins, CO
November 16, 2025*; 3:00 p.m., Marquee		at Loyola Chicago	W 80–67	4–0	15 – Tied	9 – Booth	3 – Tied	Joseph J. Gentile Arena (2,999); Chicago, IL
November 21, 2025*; 7:00 p.m., MW Network		Denver	L 81–83	4–1	29 – Jorgensen	10 – Booth	4 – Pascarelli	Moby Arena (5,900); Fort Collins, CO
November 26, 2025*; 3:00 p.m., ESPNU		vs. Virginia Tech; Battle 4 Atlantis quarterfinals	L 64–66	4–2	15 – Booth	9 – Jorgensen	4 – Tied	Imperial Arena (1,081); Paradise Island, Bahamas
November 27, 2025*; 6:30 p.m., ESPNU		vs. Wichita State; Battle 4 Atlantis consolation 2nd round	W 76–70	5–2	21 – Rechsteiner	8 – Muniz	6 – Muniz	Imperial Arena (707); Paradise Island, Bahamas
November 28, 2025*; 2:30 p.m., ESPNU		vs. South Florida; Battle 4 Atlantis 5th place game	W 83–68	6–2	28 – Pascarelli	6 – Tied	10 – Muniz	Imperial Arena (371); Paradise Island, Bahamas
December 6, 2025*; 3:00 p.m., CBSSN		Colorado; Rocky Mountain Showdown	W 91–86	7–2	26 – Pascarelli	7 – Jorgensen	6 – Rechsteiner	Moby Arena (8,083); Fort Collins, CO
December 9, 2025*; 7:00 p.m., MW Network		Dartmouth	W 76–55	8–2	14 – Rechsteiner	7 – Booth	4 – Muniz	Moby Arena (5,321); Fort Collins, CO
December 14, 2025*; 1:00 p.m., MW Network		Northern New Mexico	W 104–54	9–2	17 – Slater	7 – Mekonnen	6 – Muniz	Moby Arena (5,202); Fort Collins, CO
Mountain West regular season
December 20, 2025; 12:00 p.m., CBSSN		at Utah State	L 58–100	9–3 (0–1)	14 – Booth	3 – Butler	4 – Muniz	Smith Spectrum (10,270); Logan, UT
December 30, 2025; 7:00 p.m., MW Network		Nevada	L 62–75	9–4 (0–2)	15 – Muniz	10 – Booth	3 – Rechsteiner	Moby Arena (5,326); Fort Collins, CO
January 3, 2026; 6:00 p.m., MW Network		at Grand Canyon	W 70–60	10–4 (1–2)	19 – Booth	12 – Booth	4 – Rechsteiner	Global Credit Union Arena (7,332); Phoenix, AZ
January 6, 2026; 7:00 p.m., MW Network		New Mexico	L 70–80	10–5 (1–3)	20 – Kiudulas	6 – Booth	5 – Rechsteiner	Moby Arena (3,640); Fort Collins, CO
January 9, 2026; 8:00 p.m., CBSSN		UNLV	W 70–62	11–5 (2–3)	15 – Rechsteiner	6 – Tied	4 – Tied	Moby Arena (3,726); Fort Collins, CO
January 13, 2026; 7:00 p.m., MW Network		at Fresno State	L 69–79	11–6 (2–4)	18 – Rechsteiner	9 – Booth	6 – Muniz	Save Mart Center (3,176); Fresno, CA
January 16, 2026; 8:30 p.m., FS1		at Boise State	L 73–79	11–7 (2–5)	17 – Tied	8 – Muniz	4 – Muniz	ExtraMile Arena (9,800); Boise, ID
January 20, 2026; 7:00 p.m., MW Network		Air Force	W 81–52	12–7 (3–5)	11 – Tied	7 – Tied	4 – Jorgensen	Moby Arena (4,318); Fort Collins, CO
January 23, 2026; 8:00 p.m., FS1		Utah State	L 61–65	12–8 (3–6)	24 – Jorgensen	5 – Tied	4 – Mbemba	Moby Arena (6,461); Fort Collins, CO
January 28, 2026; 8:30 p.m., FS1		at San Diego State	L 50–73	12–9 (3–7)	9 – Muniz	5 – Pascarelli	5 – Muniz	Viejas Arena (12,414); San Diego, CA
January 31, 2026; 7:30 p.m., FS1		at Wyoming; Border War	L 57–68	12–10 (3–8)	14 – Muniz	6 – Jorgensen	7 – Muniz	Arena-Auditorium (6,384); Laramie, WY
February 7, 2026; 7:00 p.m., MW Network		San Jose State	W 65–57	13–10 (4–8)	15 – Muniz	11 – Mbemba	5 – Muniz	Moby Arena (5,103); Fort Collins, CO
February 10, 2026; 7:00 p.m., MW Network		at Air Force	W 91-74	14-10 (5-8)	14 – Rechsteiner	5 – Booth	4 – Rechsteiner	Clune Arena (2,218); Colorado Springs, CO
February 14, 2026; 2:00 p.m., MW Network		Wyoming; Border War	W 79–68	15–10 (6–8)	18 – Butler	8 – Mbemba	6 – Butler	Moby Arena (6,528); Fort Collins, CO
February 18, 2026; 9:00 p.m., CBSSN		at UNLV	W 91–86	16–10 (7–8)	20 – Muniz	5 – Mbemba	7 – Jorgensen	Thomas & Mack Center (5,312); Paradise, NV
February 21, 2026; 4:00 p.m., CBSSN		San Diego State	W 83–74	17–10 (8–8)	25 – Butler	8 – Jorgensen	7 – Muniz	Moby Arena (7,006); Fort Collins, CO
February 24, 2026; 7:00 p.m., MW Network		Fresno State	W 74–70	18–10 (9–8)	16 – Rechsteiner	9 – Booth	5 – Muniz	Moby Arena (5,013); Fort Collins, CO
February 28, 2026; 3:00 p.m., MW Network		at San Jose State	W 85–73	19–10 (10–8)	20 – Rechsteiner	5 – Tied	10 – Muniz	Provident Credit Union Event Center (2,183); San Jose, CA
March 4, 2026; 8:00 p.m., CBSSN		at New Mexico	W 82–74	20–10 (11–8)	19 – Jorgensen	5 – Tied	7 – Muniz	The Pit (14,051); Albuquerque, NM
March 7, 2026; 2:00 p.m., MW Network		Boise State	L 67–78	20–11 (11–9)	15 – Butler	5 – Butler	9 – Muniz	Moby Arena (7,105); Fort Collins, CO
Mountain West tournament
March 11, 2026; 7:00 p.m., MW Network	(7)	vs. (10) Fresno State; First Round	W 67–63	21–11	20 – Butler	9 – Butler	7 – Muniz	Thomas & Mack Center (2,351); Paradise, NV
March 12, 2026; 7:00 p.m., CBSSN	(7)	vs. (2) San Diego State; Quarterfinals	L 62–71	21–12	16 – Rechsteiner	6 – Kiudulas	3 – Butler	Thomas & Mack Center (6,236); Paradise, NV
NIT
March 18, 2026; 9:00 p.m., ESPNU	(3 AL)	Saint Joseph's; First Round	L 64–69	21–13	14 – Muniz	9 – Jorgensen	5 – Muniz	Moby Arena (1,332); Fort Collins, CO
*Non-conference game. ^{#}Rankings from AP Poll. (#) Tournament seedings in parentheses. AL=Alberquerque. All times are in Mountain Time.

== See also ==
- 2025–26 Colorado State Rams women's basketball team
