= 2025–26 Summit League men's basketball season =

College men's basketball season

- League: NCAA Division I
- Sport: Basketball
- Teams: 9
- TV partner(s): Summit League Network, CBS Sports Network

Regular season
- Regular season champion: North Dakota State
- Season MVP: Carson Johnson, Denver

Summit League tournament
- Champions: North Dakota State
- Runners-up: North Dakota
- Tournament MVP: Damari Wheeler-Thomas, North Dakota State

Seasons
- ← 2024–25 2026–27 →

2025–26 Summit League men's basketball standings
	Conf.				Overall
Team	W		L	PCT	W		L	PCT
North Dakota State †	14	–	2	.875	27	–	8	.771
St. Thomas	12	–	4	.750	24	–	10	.706
North Dakota	10	–	6	.625	18	–	17	.514
South Dakota	8	–	8	.500	16	–	16	.500
Omaha	8	–	8	.500	16	–	17	.485
Denver	8	–	8	.500	15	–	17	.469
South Dakota State	7	–	9	.438	14	–	18	.438
Oral Roberts	4	–	12	.250	10	–	23	.303
Kansas City	1	–	15	.063	4	–	27	.129
† 2026 Summit League tournament winner

The 2025–26 Summit League men's basketball season started non-conference play on November 3, 2025, and conference play started on December 31, 2025. The regular season ended on February 28, 2026.

This was the last season in the conference for Denver, as the Pioneers joined the West Coast Conference on July 1, 2026.

North Dakota State finished league play with a 14–2 record as the regular season champion. The 2026 Summit League men's basketball tournament took place from March 4 to 8, 2026. North Dakota State won the tournament, defeating North Dakota in the tournament final, and advanced to the NCAA tournament. In the NCAA tournament, the Bison were seeded 14th in the East region and played 3rd seeded Michigan State. They would fall to the Spartans, 67–92. St. Thomas received an at large bid to play in the National Invitation Tournament (NIT). They lost to Seattle in the first round, 52–67.

== Head coaches ==
=== Coaching changes ===
==== Offseason ====
===== Denver =====
On March 20, 2025, fourth-year coach Jeff Wulbrun and the Pioneers parted ways. Then, on April 14, 2025, Tim Bergstraser was announced as the next head coach for the Pioneers. Bergstraser was previously a head coach for NCAA Division II Minnesota State–Moorhead.

===== Oral Roberts =====
On March 7, 2025, second-year coach Russell Springmann was let go by the Golden Eagles. Then, on March 28, 2025, Kory Barnett was named the next head coach.

===== South Dakota State =====
On March 28, 2025, sixth-year coach Eric Henderson left South Dakota State for the head coaching job at Drake. Then, on March 29, 2025, it was announced that Jackrabbits assistant Bryan Petersen would be the next head coach.

==== Mid-season ====
===== Kansas City =====
On January 12, 2026, fourth-year coach Marvin Menzies announced his intention to retire from coaching upon the conclusion of the 2025–26 season. Later, on February 1, 2026, Kansas City announced the hiring of Mark Turgeon as the next head coach of the Roos, and he will take over after the season ends.

=== Coaches ===
Team	Head Coach	Previous Job	Years At School (Note: Year at school includes 2025–26 season.)	Record at School (Note: Overall and Summit League records are from the time at their current school and are through the end of the 2023–24 season.)	Summit League Record	Summit League Titles	NCAA tournaments (Note: NCAA tournament appearances are from the time at current school only.)	NCAA Sweet 16's
Denver	Tim Bergstraser	Minnesota State–Moorhead	1	0–0 (Note: 75 wins and 22 losses at the Division II level)	0–0	0	0 (Note: 3 NCAA Division II Tournaments)	0 (Note: 1 NCAA Division II Sweet 16)
Kansas City	Marvin Menzies	Grand Canyon (Associate HC)	4	40–57	21–29	0	5	0
North Dakota	Paul Sather	Northern State	7	73–115	38–62	0	0	0
North Dakota State	David Richman	North Dakota State (Assistant)	12	208–142	107–68	3	2	0
Omaha	Chris Crutchfield	Oregon (Assistant)	4	45–53	24–26	1	1	0
Oral Roberts	Kory Barnett	West Virginia (Assistant)	1	0–0	0–0	0	0	0
St. Thomas	John Tauer	St. Thomas (Assistant)	14	290–110 (Note: 218 wins and 50 losses at the Division III level)	34–34	0	0 (Note: 8 NCAA Division III Tournaments)	0 (Note: 4 NCAA Division III Sweet 16s, 2 NCAA Division III Final Fours, and 1 NCAA Division III National Championship)
South Dakota	Eric Peterson	Utah (Assistant)	4	43–52	21–29	0	0	0
South Dakota State	Bryan Petersen	South Dakota State (Assistant)	1	0–0	0–0	0	0	0

== Preseason awards ==
The preseason Summit League men's basketball polls were released on October 7, 2025.

=== Preseason Poll ===
First place votes in parentheses

1. St. Thomas (17) – 501
2. Omaha (13) – 495
3. South Dakota State (5) – 450
4. North Dakota State – 358
5. South Dakota (1) – 342
6. Kansas City – 187
7. Denver – 169
8. North Dakota – 168
9. Oral Roberts – 165

=== Preseason honors ===
Honor	Recipient
Preseason Player of the Year	Nolan Minessale, St. Thomas
Preseason All-Summit League First Team	Carter Bjerke, St. Thomas
Preseason All-Summit League First Team	Isaac Bruns, South Dakota
Preseason All-Summit League First Team	Kalen Garry, South Dakota State
Preseason All-Summit League First Team	Nolan Minessale, St. Thomas
Preseason All-Summit League First Team	Tony Osburn, Omaha
Preseason All-Summit League First Team	Jayson Petty, Kansas City
Preseason All-Summit League Second Team	Noah Feddersen, North Dakota State
Preseason All-Summit League Second Team	Ja'Sean Glover, Omaha
Preseason All-Summit League Second Team	Carson Johnson, Denver
Preseason All-Summit League Second Team	Eli King, North Dakota
Preseason All-Summit League Second Team	Markhi Strickland, North Dakota State

== Regular season ==
=== Conference standings ===
Current as of February 28, 2026

		Conference		Overall		
Rank	Team	Record	Percent	Record	Percent	Tiebreaker
1	North Dakota State	14–2	.875	24–7	.774	
2	St. Thomas	12–4	.750	23–8	.742	
3	North Dakota	10–6	.625	16–16	.500	
4	South Dakota	8–8	.500	16–15	.516	3–1 vs. Omaha, Denver
5	Omaha	8–8	.500	15–16	.484	2–2 vs. South Dakota, Denver
6	Denver	8–8	.500	15–16	.484	1–3 vs. South Dakota, Omaha
7	South Dakota State	7–9	.438	14–17	.452	
8	Oral Roberts	4–12	.250	9–22	.290	
9	Kansas City	1–15	.063	4–26	.133	

=== Conference matrix ===
	Denver	Kansas City	North Dakota	North Dakota State	Omaha	Oral Roberts	St. Thomas	South Dakota	South Dakota State
vs. Denver	–	0–2	1–1	1–1	2–0	1–1	1–1	1–1	1–1
vs. Kansas City	2–0	–	2–0	2–0	1–1	2–0	2–0	2–0	2–0
vs. North Dakota	1–1	0–2	–	2–0	1–1	0–2	1–1	0–2	1–1
vs. North Dakota State	1–1	0–2	0–2	–	0–2	0–2	1–1	0–2	0–2
vs. Omaha	0–2	1–1	1–1	2–0	–	0–2	1–1	2–0	1–1
vs. Oral Roberts	1–1	0–2	2–0	2–0	2–0	–	2–0	1–1	2–0
vs. St. Thomas	1–1	0–2	1–1	1–1	1–1	0–2	–	0–2	0–2
vs. South Dakota	1–1	0–2	2–0	2–0	0–2	1–1	2–0	–	0–2
vs. South Dakota State	1–1	0–2	1–1	2–0	1–1	0–2	2–0	2–0	–
Total	8–8	1–15	10–6	14–2	8–8	4–12	12–4	8–8	7–9

Through February 28, 2026

=== Players of the Week ===
Week	Player(s) of the Week	School
Nov. 11	Jeremiah Burke	Denver
Nov. 18	Nolan Minessale	St. Thomas
Nov. 25	Nolan Minessale (2)	St. Thomas (2)
Dec. 2	Isaac Bruns	South Dakota
Dec. 9	Nolan Minessale (3)	St. Thomas (3)
Dec. 16	Nolan Minessale (4)	St. Thomas (4)
Dec. 23	Lance Waddles	Omaha
Dec. 30	Trevian Carson	North Dakota State
Jan. 6	Nick Janowski	St. Thomas (5)
Jan. 13	Treyson Anderson	North Dakota State (2)
Jan. 20	Carson Johnson	Denver (2)
Jan. 27	Greyson Uelmen	North Dakota
Feb. 3	Paul Djobet	Omaha (2)
Feb. 10	Carson Johnson (2)	Denver (3)
Feb. 17	Valentino Simon	Omaha (3)
Feb. 24	Carson Johnson (3)	Denver (4)
Mar. 2	Ty Harper	Oral Roberts

=== Records against other conferences ===
As of December 29, 2025:

Major 6 Conferences	Record	Major 6 Conferences	Record
ACC	None	American	0–4
Big East	0–2	Big Ten	0–4
Big 12	0–7	SEC	0–6
Major 6 Total			0–23
Other Division I Conferences	Record	Other Division I Conferences	Record
Atlantic 10	None	ASUN	0–1
America East	None	Big Sky	10–13
Big South	2–0	Big West	4–7
CAA	None	Conference USA	2–3
Horizon League	1–1	Ivy League	None
Independents	None	MAAC	1–1
MAC	2–0	MEAC	1–0
MVC	2–4	MWC	2–5
NEC	None	OVC	3–2
Patriot League	1–0	SoCon	None
Southland	1–0	SWAC	1–0
Sun Belt	1–3	WAC	1–4
WCC	1–4		
Other Division I Total			36–48
NCAA Division I Total			36–71
NCAA Division II Total			5–0
NCAA Division III Total			4–0
NAIA Total			17–0
NCCAA Total			3–0
Total Non-Conference Record			65–71

=== Record against ranked non-conference opponents ===
Summit League records against ranked teams (rankings from AP Poll, Summit teams in Bold):

Date	Visitor	Home	Site	Score	Conference record	Reference
November 3	**North Dakota**	No. 15 Alabama	Coleman Coliseum; Tuscaloosa, AL	**L 62**–91	**0–1**	
November 24	**Denver**	No. 2 Arizona	McKale Center; Tucson, AZ	**L 73**–103	**0–2**	
December 21	**North Dakota**	No. 15 Nebraska	Pinnacle Bank Arena; Lincoln, NE	**L 55**–78	**0–3**	
December 29	**South Dakota State**	No. 1 Arizona	McKale Center; Tucson, AZ	**L 71**–99	**0–4**	

=== Points scored ===
Team	For	Against	Difference
Denver	2583	2567	+16
Kansas City	2087	2516	–429
North Dakota	2468	2502	–34
North Dakota State	2525	2189	+336
Omaha	2381	2386	–5
Oral Roberts	2271	2420	–149
St. Thomas	2582	2232	+350
South Dakota	2485	2490	–5
South Dakota State	2346	2251	+95

Through February 28, 2026

=== Home attendance ===
Team	Arena	Capacity	Total Games	Average Attendance	Attendance High	Total Attendance	% of Capacity
Denver	Hamilton Gymnasium	2,500	14	1,019	1,839; Jan 22 vs. North Dakota St	14,275	40.8%
Kansas City	Swinney Recreation Center	1,500	14	701	1,114; Feb 28 vs. Oral Roberts	9,827	46.8%
North Dakota	Betty Engelstad Sioux Center	3,300	16	1,753	2,918; Feb 14 vs. North Dakota St	28,058	53.1%
North Dakota State	Scheels Center	5,460	14	1,980	5,426; Feb 28 vs. North Dakota	27,728	36.3%
Omaha	Baxter Arena	7,898	14	2,872	3,669; Jan 10 vs. North Dakota St	40,212	36.3%
Oral Roberts	Mabee Center	10,154	14	3,288	5,467; Nov 12 vs. Tulsa	46,038	32.4%
St. Thomas	Lee and Penny Anderson Arena	5,300	14	2,883	**5,325**; Nov 8 vs. Army; Dec 11 vs. St. John's (MN)	40,370	54.4%
South Dakota	Sanford Coyote Sports Center	6,000	16	1,561	3,569; Feb 28 vs. South Dakota St	24,991	26.0%
South Dakota State	First Bank and Trust Arena	6,500	13	2,808	4,451; Jan 18 vs. Kansas City	36,507	43.2%

Bold - Exceed capacity
As of February 28, 2026
Does not include exhibition games

=== National Television Games ===
Any games that league members will play on National Television, including the Summit League's media contract with CBS Sports Network, are listed here.

Summit League members in bold

Date Time (CT)	Road Team	Home team	Final Score	Network
November 24, 2025; 9:30 PM	Denver	No. 2 Arizona	**L 73**–103	CBSSN
January 3, 2026; 3 PM	Oral Roberts	**North Dakota State**	**NDSU 79**–77^{2OT}	CBSSN
February 1, 2026; 1 PM	Kansas City	**St. Thomas**	**UST 99**–64	CBSSN
February 4, 2026; 6 PM	St. Thomas	**South Dakota State**	**UST 77**–62	CBSSN
February 7, 2026; 5 PM	South Dakota	**South Dakota State**	**USD 68**–67	CBSSN
February 14, 2026; 1 PM	North Dakota State	**North Dakota**	**NDSU 83**–66	CBSSN
February 15, 2026; 12 PM	Denver	**Omaha**	**UNO 83**–76	CBSSN
February 25, 2026; 6 PM	Omaha	**South Dakota**	**USD 89**–72	CBSSN

=== All–League Awards ===
Honor	Recipient
Player of the Year	Carson Johnson, Denver
Defensive Player of the Year	Eli King, North Dakota
Sixth Man of the Year	Noah Feddersen, North Dakota State
Freshman of the Year	Nick Janowski, St. Thomas
Coach of the Year	David Richman, North Dakota State
All-Summit League First Team	Trevian Carson, North Dakota State
All-Summit League First Team	Paul Djobet, Omaha,
All-Summit League First Team	Cameron Fens, South Dakota
All-Summit League First Team	Nick Janowski, St. Thomas
All-Summit League First Team	Carson Johnson, Denver
All-Summit League First Team	Nolan Minessale, St. Thomas
All-Summit League Second Team	Jordan Crawford, South Dakota
All-Summit League Second Team	Eli King, North Dakota
All-Summit League Second Team	Ty Harper, Oral Roberts
All-Summit League Second Team	Greyson Uelmen, North Dakota
All-Summit League Second Team	Damari Wheeler-Thomas, North Dakota State
All-Summit League Honorable Mention	Carter Bjerke, St. Thomas
All-Summit League Honorable Mention	Jeremiah Burke, Denver
All-Summit League Honorable Mention	Joe Sayler, South Dakota State
All-Summit League Honorable Mention	Andy Stefonowicz, North Dakota State
All-Summit League Honorable Mention	Damon Wilkinson, South Dakota State
All-Defensive Team	Trevian Carson, North Dakota State
All-Defensive Team	Cameron Fens, South Dakota
All-Defensive Team	Ja'Sean Glover, Omaha
All-Defensive Team	Eli King, North Dakota
All-Defensive Team	Nolan Minessale, St. Thomas
All-Newcomer Team	Trevian Carson, North Dakota State
All-Newcomer Team	Paul Djobet, Omaha
All-Newcomer Team	Nick Janowski, St. Thomas
All-Newcomer Team	Carter Johnson, Denver
All-Newcomer Team	Greyson Uelmen, North Dakota

== Postseason ==
=== Conference tournament ===
All 9 teams qualified for the 2026 Summit League men's basketball tournament. The tournament was held at the Denny Sanford Premier Center in Sioux Falls, South Dakota from March 4 to 8, 2026.

First Round; March 4 MidcoSN/SLN
8	Oral Roberts	84
9	Kansas City	62

Quarterfinals; March 5 & 6 MidcoSN/SLN
1	North Dakota State	76
8	Oral Roberts	65
4	South Dakota	62
5	Omaha	76
2	St. Thomas	80
7	South Dakota State	67
3	North Dakota	83
6	Denver	67

Semifinals; March 7 CBSSN
1	North Dakota State	74
5	Omaha	50
2	St. Thomas	66
3	North Dakota	67

Championship; March 8 CBSSN
1	North Dakota State	70
3	North Dakota	62

=== NCAA tournament ===
Seed	Region	School	First Round	Second Round	Sweet Sixteen	Elite Eight	Final Four	Championship
No. 14	East	North Dakota State	lost to No. 3 Michigan State	—	—	—	—	
	1 Bid	W-L (%):	0–1 (.000)	0–0 (–)	0–0 (–)	0–0 (–)	0–0 (–)	TOTAL: 0–1 (.000)

=== NIT ===
Region	School	First Round	Second Round	Quarterfinals	Semifinals	Championship
Auburn Region	St. Thomas	lost to No. 4 Seattle	—	—	—	
1 Bid	W-L (%):	0–1 (.000)	0–0 (–)	0–0 (–)	0–0 (–)	TOTAL: 0–1 (.000)
