= 2025–26 Kansas City Roos men's basketball team =

American college basketball season

2025–26 Kansas City Roos men's basketball
- Conference: Summit League
- Record: 4–27 (1–15 Summit)
- Head coach: Marvin Menzies (4th season)
- Associate head coach: Joe Esposito
- Assistant coaches: Michael Bowden; Anthony Richardson; Justin Tabor; Jake Kates
- Home arena: Swinney Recreation Center

2025–26 Summit League men's basketball standings
	Conf.				Overall
Team	W		L	PCT	W		L	PCT
North Dakota State †	14	–	2	.875	27	–	8	.771
St. Thomas	12	–	4	.750	24	–	10	.706
North Dakota	10	–	6	.625	18	–	17	.514
South Dakota	8	–	8	.500	16	–	16	.500
Omaha	8	–	8	.500	16	–	17	.485
Denver	8	–	8	.500	15	–	17	.469
South Dakota State	7	–	9	.438	14	–	18	.438
Oral Roberts	4	–	12	.250	10	–	23	.303
Kansas City	1	–	15	.063	4	–	27	.129
† 2026 Summit League tournament winner

The 2025–26 Kansas City Roos men's basketball team represented the University of Missouri–Kansas City during the 2025–26 NCAA Division I men's basketball season. The Roos, who were led by fourth-year head coach Marvin Menzies, played their home games at Swinney Recreation Center in Kansas City, Missouri as members of the Summit League.

The Roos finished the season 4–27 overall, 1–15 in the Summit League to finish in ninth place. In the Summit League tournament, Kansas City lost in the first round to Oral Roberts.

On January 12, 2026, Kansas City announced that Menzies would not be retained as head coach following the conclusion of the 2025-26 schedule. Menzies would stay on as head coach for the remainder of the season. At the time of the announcement, the Roos were 4-14 and two defeats into a season-ending fifteen game losing streak. Only one of the four victories was versus NCAA Division I opposition.

== Previous season ==
The Roos finished the 2024–25 season 13–20, 4–12 in Summit League play, to finish in eighth place. They defeated Oral Roberts, before falling to top-seeded and eventual tournament champions Omaha in the quarterfinals of The Summit League tournament.

== Roster ==
2025–26 Kansas City Roos men's basketball team
Players
Coaches

Pos.	#	Name	Height	Weight	Year	Previous school	Hometown
G	0	Karmello Branch	6 ft 4 in (1.93 m)	—	Jr	Santa Fe College	Tampa, Florida
G	1	Jayson Petty	6 ft 4 in (1.93 m)	190 lb (86 kg)	Jr	Phoenix Prep	Phoenix, Arizona
G	2	CJ Evans	5 ft 11 in (1.8 m)	—	Jr	Ranger College	Killeen, Texas
G	3	Jamaria Clark	6 ft 2 in (1.88 m)	—	Jr	Northeastern Oklahoma A&M	Doyline, Louisiana
G/F	4	Chris Dockery	6 ft 6 in (1.98 m)	185 lb (84 kg)	RS Jr	Independence Community College	Las Vegas, Nevada
G	5	Cory Curtis Jr.	6 ft 4 in (1.93 m)	—	RS Jr	Long Beach State	Los Angeles, California
G	6	Max Sims	6 ft 6 in (1.98 m)	190 lb (86 kg)	Jr	Binghamton	Tampa, Florida
G	7	Kasheem Grady II	6 ft 5 in (1.96 m)	185 lb (84 kg)	Sr	Howard College	Atlanta, Georgia
G/F	8	Trey Booker-Lowery	6 ft 7 in (2.01 m)	—	Jr	Lemoore College	Orlando, Florida
F	10	Jason Hilliard	6 ft 7 in (2.01 m)	—	Jr	San Bernardino Valley College	Pomona, California
G	11	Kernan Bundy	6 ft 2 in (1.88 m)	190 lb (86 kg)	Sr	Iona	Overland Park, Kansas
F	13	D'Andre Harrison	6 ft 6 in (1.98 m)	—	Fr	Perry High School	Gilbert, Arizona
F	21	Babacar Mbengue	7 ft 0 in (2.13 m)	250 lb (113 kg)	RS So	UTEP	Dakar, Senegal
F	23	Addarin Scott	6 ft 8 in (2.03 m)	220 lb (100 kg)	Sr	Auburn	Dallas, Texas
F/C	33	Jerome Palm	6 ft 10 in (2.08 m)	225 lb (102 kg)	GS	Hawai'i	Almere, Netherlands

Head coach

- Marvin Menzies (UCLA)

Assistant coach(es)

- Joe Esposito (Marist)
- Michael Bowden (Florida)
- Anthony Richardson (Florida State)
- Justin Tabor (New Mexico State)
- Jake Kates (Pensacola Christian)

Legend

- (C) Team captain
- (S) Suspended
- (I) Ineligible
- (W) Walk-on
- Injured
- Current redshirt

Roster
Last update: November 2, 2025

== Schedule and results ==
Date time, TV	Rank^{#}	Opponent^{#}	Result	Record	High points	High rebounds	High assists	Site (attendance) city, state
Non–conference regular season
November 3, 2025*; 7:00 pm, SLN		Evangel	W 80–74	1–0	18 – Petty	13 – Dockey	5 – Evans	Swinney Recreation Center (789); Kansas City, MO
November 7, 2025*; 7:00 pm, ESPN+		at Southern Illinois; Charles Helleny Tip–Off Classic	L 78–101	1–1	18 – Branch	10 – Dockery	5 – Palm	Banterra Center (3,704); Carbondale, IL
November 11, 2025*; 12:00 pm, SLN		Iona	L 91–105	1–2	23 – Evans	9 – Palm	5 – Evans	Swinney Recreation Center (525); Kansas City, MO
November 15, 2025*; 12:00 pm, SECN+		at Texas	L 55–71	1–3	17 – Evans	7 – Palm	3 – Evans	Moody Center (10,593); Austin, TX
November 19, 2025*; 7:00 pm, ESPN+		at TCU	L 45–81	1–4	18 – Branch	7 – Palm	3 – Evans	Ed and Rae Schollmaier Arena (4,484); Fort Worth, TX
November 24, 2025*; 6:00 pm, ESPN+		at Lindenwood	L 67–80	1–5	19 – Evans	6 – Petty	5 – Evans	The Hyland Arena (725); St. Charles, MO
November 29, 2025*; 3:00 pm, ESPN+		at Weber State	L 61–82	1–6	13 – Tied	5 – Palm	4 – Petty	Dee Events Center (2,012); Ogden, UT
December 3, 2025*; 7:00 pm, SLN		Idaho State; Big Sky–Summit Challenge	L 59–68	1–7	19 – Grady II	7 – Dockery	4 – Evans	Swinney Recreation Center (667); Kansas City, MO
December 6, 2025*; 4:00 pm, ESPN+		at Eastern Washington; Big Sky–Summit Challenge	L 66–90	1–8	14 – Evans	7 – Tied	2 – Tied	Reese Court (1,755); Cheney, WA
December 10, 2025*; 7:00 pm, SLN		Weber State	L 60–64	1–9	15 – Tied	15 – Palm	5 – Evans	Swinney Recreation Center (572); Kansas City, MO
December 13, 2025*; 7:00 pm, SLN		Spurgeon	W 102–75	2–9	23 – Grady II	13 – Palm	4 – Tied	Swinney Recreation Center (540); Kansas City, MO
December 16, 2025*; 7:00 pm, SECN		at Oklahoma	L 67–89	2–10	23 – Branch	10 – Palm	8 – Evans	Lloyd Noble Center (4,410); Norman, OK
December 18, 2025*; 7:00 pm, ESPN+		at Oklahoma State	L 79–91	2–11	18 – Branch	8 – Palm	4 – Branch	Gallagher–Iba Arena (4,460); Stillwater, OK
December 21, 2025*; 5:00 pm, SLN		Austin Peay	Cancelled due to unexpected death of Governors team bus driver					Swinney Recreation Center; Kansas City, MO
December 28, 2025*; 5:00 pm, SLN		McPherson	W 91–78	3–11	21 – Branch	12 – Palm	6 – Evans	Swinney Recreation Center (668); Kansas City, MO
Summit League regular season
December 31, 2025; 3:00 pm, SLN		at Denver	L 74–87	3–12 (0–1)	18 – Branch	11 – Dockery	8 – Evans	Hamilton Gymnasium (984); Denver, CO
January 3, 2026; 7:00 pm, SLN		at Omaha	W 73–66	4–12 (1–1)	20 – Branch	11 – Dockery	5 – Evans	Baxter Arena (3,324); Omaha, NE
January 8, 2026; 7:00 pm, SLN		North Dakota State	L 73–97	4–13 (1–2)	19 – Branch	6 – Dockery	6 – Petty	Swinney Recreation Center (539); Kansas City, MO
January 10, 2026; 7:00 pm, SLN		North Dakota	L 79–81	4–14 (1–3)	24 – Evans	9 – Dockery	7 – Evans	Swinney Recreation Center (672); Kansas City, MO
January 15, 2026; 7:00 pm, SLN		at South Dakota	L 83–99	4–15 (1–4)	21 – Grady II	7 – Grady II	2 – Tied	Sanford Coyote Sports Center (1,760); Vermillion, SD
January 17, 2026; 4:15 pm, SLN		at South Dakota State	L 62–90	4–16 (1–5)	14 – Grady II	6 – Palm	7 – Evans	First Bank & Trust Arena (4,451); Brookings, SD
January 24, 2026; 7:00 pm, SLN		Omaha	L 60–77	4–17 (1–6)	15 – Grady II	7 – Dockery	3 – Dockery	Swinney Recreation Center (405); Kansas City, MO
January 28, 2026; 7:00 pm, SLN		Denver	L 61–69	4–18 (1–7)	17 – Grady II	8 – Dockery	2 – Tied	Swinney Recreation Center (692); Kansas City, MO
February 1, 2026; 1:00 pm, CBSSN		at St. Thomas	L 64–99	4–19 (1–8)	16 – Evans	7 – Evans	4 – Tied	Lee & Penny Anderson Arena (2,552); St. Paul, MN
February 4, 2026; 7:00 pm, SLN		South Dakota	L 75–82 ^{OT}	4–20 (1–9)	17 – Dockery	8 – Dockery	4 – Evans	Swinney Recreation Center (840); Kansas City, MO
February 12, 2026; 7:00 pm, SLN		at Oral Roberts	L 60–69	4–21 (1–10)	18 – Branch	12 – Palm	1 – Tied	Mabee Center (2,525); Tulsa, OK
February 14, 2026; 7:00 pm, SLN		St. Thomas	L 64–104	4–22 (1–11)	13 – Dockery	6 – Tied	4 – Evans	Swinney Recreation Center (773); Kansas City, MO
February 19, 2026; 7:00 pm, SLN		at North Dakota	L 70–85	4–23 (1–12)	21 – Booker–Lowery	8 – Booker–Lowery	3 – Palm	Betty Engelstad Sioux Center (1,867); Grand Forks, ND
February 21, 2026; 1:00 pm, SLN		at North Dakota State	L 59–95	4–24 (1–13)	15 – Grady II	5 – Tied	3 – Tied	Scheels Center (2,036); Fargo, ND
February 26, 2026; 7:00 pm, SLN		South Dakota State	L 59–73	4–25 (1–14)	20 – Evans	5 – Palm	6 – Evans	Swinney Recreation Center (1,031); Kansas City, MO
February 28, 2026; 7:00 pm, SLN		Oral Roberts; Senior Night	L 70–94	4–26 (1–15)	22 – Branch	5 – Mbengue	5 – Tied	Swinney Recreation Center (1,114); Kansas City, MO
Summit League tournament
March 4, 2026*; 7:00 pm, SLN	(9)	vs. (8) Oral Roberts; First Round	L 62–84	4–27	14 – Petty	6 – Dockery	2 – Tied	Denny Sanford Premier Center (3,675); Sioux Falls, SD
*Non-conference game. ^{#}Rankings from AP Poll. (#) Tournament seedings in parentheses. All times are in Central.
