= 2026 Summit League men's basketball tournament =

American college basketball postseason tournament

- Classification: Division I
- Season: 2025–26
- Teams: 9
- Site: Denny Sanford Premier Center; Sioux Falls, South Dakota
- Champions: North Dakota State (6th title)
- Winning coach: David Richman (4th title)
- MVP: Damari Wheeler-Thomas (NDSU)
- Attendance: 29,663 (overall); 5,937 (championship)
- Television: CBSSN, Midco Sports/SLN

2025–26 Summit League men's basketball standings
	Conf.				Overall
Team	W		L	PCT	W		L	PCT
North Dakota State †	14	–	2	.875	27	–	8	.771
St. Thomas	12	–	4	.750	24	–	10	.706
North Dakota	10	–	6	.625	18	–	17	.514
South Dakota	8	–	8	.500	16	–	16	.500
Omaha	8	–	8	.500	16	–	17	.485
Denver	8	–	8	.500	15	–	17	.469
South Dakota State	7	–	9	.438	14	–	18	.438
Oral Roberts	4	–	12	.250	10	–	23	.303
Kansas City	1	–	15	.063	4	–	27	.129
† 2026 Summit League tournament winner

The 2026 Summit League men's basketball tournament was the postseason men's basketball tournament for the Summit League for the 2025–26 season. All tournament games were played at the Denny Sanford Premier Center in Sioux Falls, South Dakota, from March 4–8, 2026.

Regular season champion North Dakota State defeated North Dakota to win the tournament and receive the conference's automatic bid to the NCAA tournament.

== Seeds ==
All nine conference teams participated in the tournament. Teams were seeded by record within the conference, with a tiebreaker system to seed teams with identical conference records. The tiebreakers operated in the following order:

1. Head-to-head record
2. Record against the top-seeded team not involved in the tie, going down through the standings until the tie is broken

Seed	School	League Record	Tiebreaker(s)
1	North Dakota State	14–2	
2	St. Thomas	12–4	
3	North Dakota	10–6	
4	South Dakota	8–8	3–1 vs. Omaha/Denver
5	Omaha	8–8	2–2 vs. South Dakota/Denver
6	Denver	8–8	1–3 vs. South Dakota/Omaha
7	South Dakota State	7–9	
8	Oral Roberts	4–12	
9	Kansas City	1–15	

== Schedule and results ==
Game	Time	Matchup	Score	Attendance	Television
First Round – Wednesday, March 4
1	7:00 pm	No. 8 Oral Roberts vs. No. 9 Kansas City	84–62	3,675	Midco Sports/ SLN
Quarterfinals – Thursday, March 5
2	6:00 pm	No. 1 North Dakota State vs. No. 8 Oral Roberts	76–65	6,614	Midco Sports/ SLN
3	8:30 pm	No. 2 St. Thomas vs. No. 7 South Dakota State	80–67	6,614	Midco Sports/ SLN
Quarterfinals – Friday, March 6
4	6:00 pm	No. 4 South Dakota vs. No. 5 Omaha	76–62	6,723	Midco Sports/ SLN
5	8:35 pm	No. 3 North Dakota vs. No. 6 Denver	83–67	6,723	Midco Sports/ SLN
Semifinals - Saturday, March 7
6	7:15 pm	No. 1 North Dakota State vs. No. 5 Omaha	74–50	6,684	CBSSN
7	9:45 pm	No. 2 St. Thomas vs. No. 3 North Dakota	67–66	6,684	CBSSN
Championship – Sunday, March 8
8	8:00 pm	No. 1 North Dakota State vs. No. 3 North Dakota	70–62	5,937	CBSSN
*Game times in CST through the semifinals and CDT for the final. Rankings denote tournament seed. Reference:

== Bracket ==
First Round; March 4 Midco Sports/SLN
8	Oral Roberts	84
9	Kansas City	62

Quarterfinals; March 5 & 6 Midco Sports/SLN
1	North Dakota State	76
8	Oral Roberts	65
4	South Dakota	62
5	Omaha	76
2	St. Thomas	80
7	South Dakota State	67
3	North Dakota	83
6	Denver	67

Semifinals; March 7 CBSSN
1	North Dakota State	74
5	Omaha	50
2	St. Thomas	66
3	North Dakota	67

Championship; March 8 CBSSN
1	North Dakota State	70
3	North Dakota	62

== Game summaries ==
=== First Round ===
Midco Sports/
SLN

March 4
7:00 p.m. CST

Box score

No. 8 Oral Roberts 84, No. 9 Kansas City 62
Scoring by half: 44–21, 40–41
Pts: Harper, 22; Rebs: Tied (2), 8 Asts: Dow, 3	Pts: Petty, 14; Rebs: Dockery, 6 Asts: Tied (3), 2
Game 1

Denny Sanford Premier Center
Sioux Falls, SD
Attendance: 3,675
Referees: Kueneman, Raher, Stewart

=== Quarterfinals ===
Midco Sports/
SLN

March 5
6:00 p.m. CST

Box score

No. 1 North Dakota State 76, No. 8 Oral Roberts 65
Scoring by half: 36–26, 40–39
Pts: Wheeler-Thomas, 18; Rebs: Feddersen, 11; Asts: Stefonowicz, 7	Pts: Dow, 24; Rebs: Naveh, 10; Asts: Tied (2), 4
Game 1

Denny Sanford Premier Center
Sioux Falls, SD
Attendance: 6,614
Referees: Anslinger, McNutt, Riggs

Midco Sports/
SLN

March 5
8:30 p.m.

Box score

No. 2 St. Thomas 80, No. 7 South Dakota State 67
Scoring by half: 39–37, 41–30
Pts: Oosterbaan, 23; Rebs: Minessale, 8 Asts: Minessale, 6	Pts: Jackson, 16; Rebs: Tied (2), 6 Asts: Sayler, 4
Game 2

Denny Sanford Premier Center
Sioux Falls, SD
Attendance: 6,614
Referees: Burris, Kueneman, Schumer

Midco Sports/
SLN

March 6
6:00 p.m. CST

Box score

No. 4 South Dakota 62, No. 5 Omaha 76
Scoring by half: 31–34, 31–42
Pts: Buzelis, 16; Rebs: Tied (2), 12; Asts: Buzelis, 3	Pts: Glover, 25; Rebs: Djobet, 14; Asts: Glover, 3
Game 3

Denny Sanford Premier Center
Sioux Falls, SD
Attendance: 6,723
Referees: Anslinger, Love, Smith

Midco Sports/
SLN

March 6
8:35 p.m.

Box score

No. 3 North Dakota 83, No. 6 Denver 67
Scoring by half: 42–29, 41–38
Pts: Uelmen, 41; Rebs: Curtis, 8 Asts: Tied (2), 3	Pts: Johnson, 17; Rebs: Oldham, 7 Asts: Nelson, 4
Game 4

Denny Sanford Premier Center
Sioux Falls, SD
Attendance: 6,723
Referees: McNutt, Stewart, VonSossan

=== Semifinals ===
CBS Sports Network

March 7
7:15 p.m. CST

Box score

No. 1 North Dakota State 74, No. 5 Omaha 50
Scoring by half: 40–25, 34–25
Pts: Anderson, 16; Rebs: Feddersen, 13; Asts: Stefonowicz, 8	Pts: Glover, 13; Rebs: Glover, 6 Asts: Stubblefield, 3
Game 1

Denny Sanford Premier Center
Sioux Falls, SD
Attendance: 6,684
Referees: Anslinger, Smith, VonSossan

CBS Sports Network

March 7
9:45 p.m.

Box score

No. 2 St. Thomas 66, No. 3 North Dakota 67
Scoring by half: 34–28, 32–39
Pts: Minessale, 23; Rebs: Minessale, 9 Asts: Herro, 7	Pts: Uelmen, 28; Rebs: Natsvishvili, 7 Asts: Natsvishvili, 3
Game 2

Denny Sanford Premier Center
Sioux Falls, SD
Attendance: 6,684
Referees: McNutt, Riggs, Stewart

=== Championship ===
CBS Sports Network

March 8
8:00 p.m. CDT

Box score

No. 1 North Dakota State 70, No. 3 North Dakota 62
Scoring by half: 38–30, 32–32
Pts: Wheeler-Thomas, 19; Rebs: Carson, 10; Asts: Carson, 4	Pts: Uelmen, 24; Rebs: Anderson, 9 Asts: Uelmen, 4
Championship

Denny Sanford Premier Center
Sioux Falls, SD
Attendance: 5,937
Referees: McNutt, Pfeifer, Schumer

== All–Tournament Team ==
The following players were named to the All–Tournament Team:

Player	Team
Noah Feddersen	North Dakota State
Eli King	North Dakota
Nolan Minessale	St. Thomas
Greyson Uelmen	North Dakota
Damari Wheeler-Thomas (MVP)	North Dakota State

== See also ==
- 2026 Summit League women's basketball tournament
