= 2025–26 North Dakota State Bison men's basketball team =

American college basketball season

2025–26 North Dakota State Bison men's basketball

Summit League regular season and tournament champions

NCAA Tournament, First round
- Conference: Summit League
- Record: 27–8 (14–2 Summit)
- Head coach: David Richman (12th season)
- Associate head coach: Luke Strege
- Assistant coaches: Joshua Jones; Spencer Wilker; Camron Greer
- Home arena: Scheels Center

2025–26 Summit League men's basketball standings
	Conf.				Overall
Team	W		L	PCT	W		L	PCT
North Dakota State †	14	–	2	.875	27	–	8	.771
St. Thomas	12	–	4	.750	24	–	10	.706
North Dakota	10	–	6	.625	18	–	17	.514
South Dakota	8	–	8	.500	16	–	16	.500
Omaha	8	–	8	.500	16	–	17	.485
Denver	8	–	8	.500	15	–	17	.469
South Dakota State	7	–	9	.438	14	–	18	.438
Oral Roberts	4	–	12	.250	10	–	23	.303
Kansas City	1	–	15	.063	4	–	27	.129
† 2026 Summit League tournament winner

The 2025–26 North Dakota State Bison men's basketball team represented North Dakota State University during the 2025–26 NCAA Division I men's basketball season. The Bison, who were led by 12th-year head coach David Richman, played their home games at the Scheels Center, as members of the Summit League.

The Bison finished the regular season with 24–7 overall, and 14–2 in the Summit League to finish in first place and winning the program's fifth regular season conference title. In the Summit League tournament, they defeated Oral Roberts in the quarterfinals, Omaha in the semifinals, and North Dakota in the championship game to claim the program's sixth tournament title and clinch their fifth NCAA tournament appearance. In the NCAA tournament, the Bison would fall to Michigan State in the first round.

== Previous season ==
The Bison finished the 2024–25 season 21–11, 10–6 in Summit League play to finish in fourth place. In the Summit League tournament, they lost to South Dakota in the quarterfinals.

== Offseason ==
=== Departures ===
Name	Number	Pos.	Height	Weight	Year	Hometown	Reason for departure
Luke Kasubke	0	G	6'5"	190	Senior	St. Louis, MO	Graduated
Jeremiah Burke	2	F	6'7"	215	Senior	Milwaukee, WI	Transferred to Denver
Brennan Watkins	3	G	6'0"	180	Junior	Kearney, MO	Transferred to Chattanooga
Jacksen Moni	4	F	6'10"	235	Senior	Fargo, ND	Graduated
Jacari White	11	G	6'3"	180	Senior	Orlando, FL	Transferred to Virginia
Masen Miller	12	G	6'2"	195	Senior	Iowa City, IA	Graduated
Darik Dissette	13	G	6'4"	185	Sophomore	Minot, ND	Transferred to Minot State (NCAA Division II)
Eli Bradley	14	G	6'3"	180	RS Freshman	Las Vegas, NV	Unknown
Tajavis Miller	21	G	6'4"	200	Junior	Lubbock, TX	Transferred to New Mexico
Patrick Bath	24	F	6'9"	235	RS Freshman	Fargo, ND	Transferred to Concordia–St. Paul (NCAA Division II)

=== Incoming transfers ===
Name	Number	Pos.	Height	Weight	Year	Hometown	Previous School
Trevian Carson	0	G	6'4"	200	Junior	West Des Moines, IA	Des Moines Area Community College
Tay Smith	3	G	6'3"	190	Senior	Bowling Green, KY	Lenoir–Rhyne (NC)
Emil Skyttä	8	G	6'5"	195	Junior	Helsinki, Finland	Sacramento State
Max Majerle	11	G	6'4"	195	Junior	Scottsdale, AZ	Pima Community College
Caleb Schoenrock	22	F	6'7"	—	RS Freshman	St. Francis, MN	Minnesota (manager)
Markhi Strickland	30	G	6'6"	210	Senior	Miami, FL	Western Michigan

=== 2025 recruiting class ===
College recruiting information
Name	Hometown	School	Height	Weight	Commit date
Riley Massey; G	O'Fallon, Illinois	De Smet Jesuit High School	6 ft 3 in (1.91 m)	N/A	Aug 2, 2024
Riley Massey; G	Recruit ratings: Scout: Rivals: 247Sports: ESPN: (0)				
Riley Saunders; G	Sandy Springs, Georgia	Landmark Christian School	6 ft 0 in (1.83 m)	180 lb (82 kg)	May 3, 2025
Riley Saunders; G	Recruit ratings: Scout: Rivals: 247Sports: ESPN: (0)				
Dom Clay; G	Quincy, Illinois	Quincy Senior High School	6 ft 4 in (1.93 m)	N/A	Apr 16, 2025
Dom Clay; G	Recruit ratings: Scout: Rivals: 247Sports: ESPN: (0)				
Overall recruit ranking:
Note: In many cases, Scout, Rivals, 247Sports, On3, and ESPN may conflict in their listings of height and weight.; In these cases, the average was taken. ESPN grades are on a 100-point scale.; Sources: "2025 Team Ranking". Rivals.

== Roster ==
2025–26 North Dakota State Bison men's basketball team
Players
Coaches

Pos.	#	Name	Height	Weight	Year	Previous school	Hometown
G	0	Trevian Carson	6 ft 4 in (1.93 m)	200 lb (91 kg)	Jr	Des Moines Area Community College	West Des Moines, IA
G	1	Damari Wheeler-Thomas	6 ft 0 in (1.83 m)	190 lb (86 kg)	Jr	Larkin High School	Elgin, IL
G	2	Riley Massey	6 ft 3 in (1.91 m)	185 lb (84 kg)	Fr	De Smet Jesuit High School	O'Fallon, IL
G	3	Tay Smith	6 ft 3 in (1.91 m)	190 lb (86 kg)	Sr	Lenoir–Rhyne University	Bowling Green, KY
G	5	Andy Stefonowicz	6 ft 2 in (1.88 m)	165 lb (75 kg)	So	Minnetonka High School	Minnetonka, MN
G	7	Carson Smith	6 ft 6 in (1.98 m)	200 lb (91 kg)	RS Fr	Bountiful High School	Bountiful, UT
G	8	Emil Skyttä	6 ft 5 in (1.96 m)	195 lb (88 kg)	Jr	Sacramento State	Helsinki, Finland
G	11	Max Majerle	6 ft 4 in (1.93 m)	195 lb (88 kg)	Jr	Pima Community College	Scottsdale, AZ
G	13	Riley Saunders	6 ft 0 in (1.83 m)	180 lb (82 kg)	Fr	Landmark Christian School	Sandy Springs, GA
G	14	Dom Clay (redshirt)	6 ft 4 in (1.93 m)	175 lb (79 kg)	Fr	Quincy Senior High School	Quincy, IL
F	22	Caleb Schoenrock	6 ft 7 in (2.01 m)	200 lb (91 kg)	RS Fr	Minnesota	St. Francis, MN
G	30	Markhi Strickland	6 ft 6 in (1.98 m)	210 lb (95 kg)	Sr	Western Michigan	Miami, FL
F	34	Noah Feddersen	6 ft 10 in (2.08 m)	250 lb (113 kg)	Jr	Menomonie High School	Menomonie, WI
F	44	Treyson Anderson	6 ft 9 in (2.06 m)	240 lb (109 kg)	So	Pius X High School	Lincoln, NE

Head coach

- David Richman (North Dakota State)

Assistant coach(es)

- Luke Strege (Wisconsin-La Crosse)
- Joshua Jones (Eastern Kentucky)
- Spencer Wilker (North Dakota State)
- Camron Greer (North Dakota State)

Legend

- (C) Team captain
- (S) Suspended
- (I) Ineligible
- (W) Walk-on
- Injured
- Current redshirt

Roster

== Schedule and results ==
Date time, TV	Rank^{#}	Opponent^{#}	Result	Record	High points	High rebounds	High assists	Site (attendance) city, state
Exhibition
October 16, 2025*; 7:00 p.m., BIG+		at Minnesota	L 54–80	–	14 – Carson	5 – Tied (2)	2 – Tied (4)	Williams Arena (7,332); Minneapolis, MN
October 23, 2025*; 7:00 p.m., Summit League Network		Minnesota State–Moorhead	W 101–69	–	19 – Feddersen	10 – Feddersen	7 – Stefonowicz	Scheels Center (1,111); Fargo, ND
Non-conference regular season
November 3, 2025*; 8:30 p.m., ESPN+		at Oregon State	L 65–67	0–1	17 – Strickland	7 – Stefonowicz	4 – Stefonowicz	Gill Coliseum (2,829); Corvallis, OR
November 5, 2025*; 8:00 p.m., ESPN+		at UC Davis	L 68–80	0–2	17 – Strickland	6 – Strickland	5 – Stefonowicz	University Credit Union Center (893); Davis, CA
November 11, 2025*; 7:00 p.m., WDAY Xtra/SLN		Cal State Northridge	W 90–68	1–2	22 – Wheeler-Thomas	10 – Tied (2)	5 – Stefonowicz	Scheels Center (1,005); Fargo, ND
November 12, 2025*; 7:00 p.m., WDAY Xtra/SLN		St. Scholastica (MN)	W 111–38	2–2	24 – T. Smith	6 – Tied (2)	8 – Stefonowicz	Scheels Center (723); Fargo, ND
November 17, 2025*; 7:00 p.m., WDAY Xtra/SLN		Southern Illinois	W 92–85	3–2	24 – Wheeler-Thomas	10 – Carson	6 – Stefonowicz	Scheels Center (1,068); Fargo, ND
November 19, 2025*; 7:00 p.m., WDAY Xtra/SLN		Jamestown (ND)	W 82–67	4–2	22 – Strickland	8 – Carson	5 – Tied (2)	Scheels Center (854); Fargo, ND
November 26, 2025*; 2:00 p.m.		vs. Jacksonville State	W 56–43	5–2	10 – Wheeler-Thomas	9 – Feddersen	6 – Stefonowicz	First National Bank Arena (203); Jonesboro, AR
November 28, 2025*; 2:00 p.m., ESPN+		at Arkansas State	L 80–85 ^{OT}	5–3	26 – Wheeler-Thomas	9 – Carson	5 – Stefonowicz	First National Bank Arena (3,167); Jonesboro, AR
December 3, 2025*; 8:00 p.m., ESPN+		at Montana; Big Sky–Summit Challenge	W 81–72	6–3	23 – Wheeler-Thomas	7 – Strickland	5 – Wheeler-Thomas	Dahlberg Arena (2,580); Missoula, MT
December 6, 2025*; 7:00 p.m., WDAY Xtra/SLN		Northern Arizona; Big Sky–Summit Challenge	W 69–68	7–3	19 – Carson	12 – Carson	4 – Stefonowicz	Scheels Center (1,537); Fargo, ND
December 11, 2025*; 8:30 p.m., ESPN+		at Cal State Bakersfield	W 80–69	8–3	21 – Wheeler-Thomas	9 – Tied (2)	4 – Carson	Icardo Center (223); Bakersfield, CA
December 13, 2025*; 1:00 p.m., ESPN+		at Drake	W 99–94	9–3	29 – Carson	7 – Tied (2)	9 – Wheeler-Thomas	Knapp Center (3,056); Des Moines, IA
December 15, 2025*; 7:00 p.m., WDAY Xtra/SLN		Minnesota Crookston	W 101–67	10–3	19 – Strickland	6 – Feddersen	3 – Stefonowicz	Scheels Center (1,106); Fargo, ND
December 21, 2025*; 6:00 p.m.		vs. UC Irvine; Sun Bowl Invitational	L 73–74	10–4	14 – Tied (2)	9 – Feddersen	5 – Wheeler-Thomas	Don Haskins Center (467); El Paso, TX
December 22, 2025*; 6:00 p.m.		at UTEP; Sun Bowl Invitational	L 66–76	10–5	23 – Carson	8 – Carson	3 – Tied (3)	Don Haskins Center (3,538); El Paso, TX
Summit League regular season
December 31, 2025; 4:00 p.m., WDAY Xtra/SLN		South Dakota	W 84–61	11–5 (1–0)	14 – Anderson	7 – Carson	7 – Carson	Scheels Center (1,982); Fargo, ND
January 3, 2026; 3:00 p.m., CBSSN		Oral Roberts	W 79–77 ^{2OT}	12–5 (2–0)	15 – Strickland	13 – Anderson	4 – Wheeler-Thomas	Scheels Center (1,714); Fargo, ND
January 8, 2026; 7:00 p.m., SLN		at Kansas City	W 97–73	13–5 (3–0)	23 – Anderson	8 – Anderson	8 – Stefonowicz	Swinney Recreation Center (539); Kansas City, MO
January 10, 2026; 1:00 p.m., SLN		at Omaha	W 78–76	14–5 (4–0)	22 – Anderson	6 – Wheeler-Thomas	3 – Tied (4)	Baxter Arena (3,669); Omaha, NE
January 14, 2026; 7:00 p.m., WDAY Xtra/SLN		South Dakota State	W 76–65	15–5 (5–0)	20 – Anderson	8 – Wheeler-Thomas	4 – Carson	Scheels Center (3,313); Fargo, ND
January 17, 2026; 1:00 p.m., WDAY Xtra/SLN		St. Thomas	W 68–65	16–5 (6–0)	16 – Carson	9 – Anderson	4 – Stefonowicz	Scheels Center (2,954); Fargo, ND
January 22, 2026; 8:00 p.m., SLN		at Denver	W 82–77	17–5 (7–0)	23 – Carson	9 – Anderson	4 – Wheeler-Thomas	Hamilton Gymnasium (1,839); Denver, CO
January 24, 2026; 7:00 p.m., SLN		at Oral Roberts	W 86–58	18–5 (8–0)	24 – T. Smith	5 – Tied (2)	8 – Stefonowicz	Mabee Center (2,191); Tulsa, OK
January 31, 2026; 5:00 p.m., SLN		at South Dakota	W 89–84 ^{OT}	19–5 (9–0)	20 – Feddersen	9 – Feddersen	10 – Stefonowicz	Sanford Coyote Sports Center (1,861); Vermillion, SD
February 5, 2026; 7:00 p.m., WDAY Xtra/SLN		Denver	L 71–78	19–6 (9–1)	19 – Strickland	6 – Tied (2)	5 – Stefonowicz	Scheels Center (1,687); Fargo, ND
February 7, 2026; 1:00 p.m., WDAY Xtra/SLN		Omaha	W 92–84	20–6 (10–1)	18 – Feddersen	6 – Tied (2)	8 – Stefonowicz	Scheels Center (2,323); Fargo, ND
February 14, 2026; 1:00 p.m., CBSSN		at North Dakota	W 83–66	21–6 (11–1)	20 – Stefonowicz	6 – Skytta	4 – Stefonowicz	Betty Engelstad Sioux Center (2,918); Grand Forks, ND
February 18, 2026; 7:00 p.m., SLN		at South Dakota State	W 74–66	22–6 (12–1)	23 – Wheeler-Thomas	12 – Carson	4 – Tied (2)	First Bank & Trust Arena (3,619); Brookings, SD
February 21, 2026; 1:00 p.m., WDAY Xtra/SLN		Kansas City	W 95–59	23–6 (13–1)	20 – Anderson	11 – Anderson	11 – Stefonowicz	Scheels Center (2,036); Fargo, ND
February 26, 2026; 8:00 p.m., SLN		at St. Thomas	L 62–84	23–7 (13–2)	13 – Feddersen	7 – Carson	3 – Wheeler-Thomas	Lee and Penny Anderson Arena (4,708); St. Paul, MN
February 28, 2026; 4:00 p.m., WDAY Xtra/SLN		North Dakota	W 96–63	24–7 (14–2)	28 – T. Smith	6 – Tied (2)	7 – Carson	Scheels Center (5,426); Fargo, ND
Summit League tournament
March 5, 2026*; 6:00 p.m., SLN	(1)	vs. (8) Oral Roberts; Quarterfinal	W 76–65	25–7	18 – Wheeler-Thomas	11 – Feddersen	7 – Stefonowicz	Denny Sanford Premier Center (6,614); Sioux Falls, SD
March 7, 2026*; 7:15 p.m., CBSSN	(1)	vs. (5) Omaha; Semifinal	W 74–50	26–7	16 – Anderson	13 – Feddersen	8 – Stefonowicz	Denny Sanford Premier Center (6,684); Sioux Falls, SD
March 8, 2026*; 8:00 p.m., CBSSN	(1)	vs. (3) North Dakota; Championship	W 70–62	27–7	19 – Wheeler-Thomas	10 – Carson	4 – Carson	Denny Sanford Premier Center (5,937); Sioux Falls, SD
NCAA tournament
March 19, 2026*; 3:05 p.m., TNT	(14 E)	vs. (3 E) No. 11 Michigan State; First round	L 67–92	27–8	16 – Wheeler-Thomas	7 – Carson	6 – Carson	KeyBank Center (17,182); Buffalo, NY
*Non-conference game. ^{#}Rankings from AP Poll. (#) Tournament seedings in parentheses. E=East. All times are in Central.

== Awards and accolades ==
=== Summit League Player of the Week ===
Week	Player(s) of the Week	School
Dec. 30	Trevian Carson	North Dakota State
Jan. 13	Treyson Anderson	North Dakota State (2)

=== Summit League Regular Season Awards ===
==== Individual Awards ====
- Noah Feddersen (Sixth Man of the Year)
- David Richman (Coach of the Year)

==== All–Summit League First Team ====
- Trevian Carson

==== All–Summit League Second Team ====
- Damari Wheeler-Thomas

==== All–Summit League Honorable Mention ====
- Andy Stefonowicz

==== All–Defensive Team ====
- Trevian Carson

==== All–Newcomer Team ====
- Trevian Carson

=== Summit League All–Tournament Team ===
- Damari Wheeler-Thomas (MVP)
- Noah Feddersen
