= 2025–26 South Dakota State Jackrabbits men's basketball team =

American college basketball season

2025–26 South Dakota State Jackrabbits men's basketball
- Conference: Summit League
- Record: 14–18 (7–9 Summit)
- Head coach: Bryan Petersen (1st season)
- Associate head coach: Cole Christian
- Assistant coaches: Ryan Kirsch; Nick Smith; Jamal Nixon; Tucker Wookey
- Home arena: First Bank & Trust Arena

2025–26 Summit League men's basketball standings
	Conf.				Overall
Team	W		L	PCT	W		L	PCT
North Dakota State	14	–	2	.875	25	–	7	.781
St. Thomas	12	–	4	.750	24	–	8	.750
North Dakota	10	–	6	.625	16	–	16	.500
South Dakota	8	–	8	.500	16	–	15	.516
Omaha	8	–	8	.500	15	–	16	.484
Denver	8	–	8	.500	15	–	16	.484
South Dakota State	7	–	9	.438	14	–	18	.438
Oral Roberts	4	–	12	.250	10	–	23	.303
Kansas City	1	–	15	.063	4	–	27	.129
† 2026 Summit League tournament winner As of March 5, 2026

The 2025–26 South Dakota State Jackrabbits men's basketball team represented South Dakota State University in the 2025–26 NCAA Division I men's basketball season. The Jackrabbits, who were led by first-year head coach Bryan Petersen, played home games at First Bank & Trust Arena in Brookings, South Dakota. Petersen replaced Eric Henderson, who left the program to take over as head coach at Drake.

The Jackrabbits finished the regular season 14–17 overall, 7–9 in the Summit League to finish in seventh place. In the Summit League tournament, they lost to St. Thomas in the quarterfinals.

== Previous season ==
The Jackrabbits finished the 2024–25 season 20–12, 11–5 in Summit League play to finish in third place. They would lose to North Dakota in the quarterfinals of the Summit League tournament.

== Roster ==
2025–26 South Dakota State Jackrabbits men's basketball team
Players
Coaches

Pos.	#	Name	Height	Weight	Year	Previous school	Hometown
G	0	Trey Buchanan	6 ft 0 in (1.83 m)	185 lb (84 kg)	RS Fr	Westfield High School	Westfield, IN
G	2	Luke Haertle	6 ft 3 in (1.91 m)	205 lb (93 kg)	Jr	Lake Country Lutheran High School	Hartland, WI
G	3	Joe Sayler	6 ft 3 in (1.91 m)	195 lb (88 kg)	So	White River High School	White River, SD
F	5	Caleb Delzell	6 ft 9 in (2.06 m)	230 lb (104 kg)	GS	Camanche High School	Camanche, IA
G	6	Jaden Rogers	6 ft 6 in (1.98 m)	215 lb (98 kg)	Fr	Waukee High School	Waukee, IA
G	10	Kalen Garry	6 ft 3 in (1.91 m)	200 lb (91 kg)	Jr	De Smet High School	De Smet, SD
F	11	Matthew Mors	6 ft 7 in (2.01 m)	215 lb (98 kg)	Sr	Yankton High School	Yankton, SD
G	12	Bubz Alvarez	6 ft 5 in (1.96 m)	200 lb (91 kg)	RS So	Houston Heights High School	Houston, TX
G	14	Jaden Jackson	6 ft 0 in (1.83 m)	185 lb (84 kg)	So	Bellevue West High School	Bellevue, NE
F	22	Davis Kern	6 ft 9 in (2.06 m)	225 lb (102 kg)	Fr	Linn-Mar High School	Marion, IA
G	23	Andrell Burton Jr.	6 ft 7 in (2.01 m)	195 lb (88 kg)	RS Fr	Campus High School	Wichita, KS
G	33	Jadyn Cascio Jensen	6 ft 3 in (1.91 m)	190 lb (86 kg)	RS Fr	Bellevue West High School	Fremont, NE
C	34	Damon Wilkinson	6 ft 10 in (2.08 m)	245 lb (111 kg)	So	De Smet High School	De Smet, SD
C	35	Alec Squires	6 ft 10 in (2.08 m)	250 lb (113 kg)	RS Fr	Sioux Valley High School	Volga, SD

Head coach

- Bryan Petersen (Iowa State)

Assistant coach(es)

- Cole Christian (Iowa State)
- Ryan Kirsch (Iowa State)
- Nick Smith (Southwest Minnesota State)
- Jamal Nixon (Oklahoma)
- Tucker Wookey (South Dakota State)

Legend

- (C) Team captain
- (S) Suspended
- (I) Ineligible
- (W) Walk-on
- Injured
- Current redshirt

Roster
Last update: October 20, 2025

== Schedule and results ==
Date time, TV	Rank^{#}	Opponent^{#}	Result	Record	Site (attendance) city, state
Exhibition
October 29, 2025*; 8:30 p.m.		Mayville State	W 109–61	–	First Bank & Trust Arena; Brookings, SD
Non-conference regular season
November 3, 2025*; 8:00 p.m., YouTube/X		vs. Merrimack	W 75–66	1–0	Sanford Pentagon (1,784); Sioux Falls, SD
November 6, 2025*; 7:00 p.m., Summit League Network		Dakota State	W 68–62	2–0	First Bank & Trust Arena (1,887); Brookings, SD
November 9, 2025*; 1:00 p.m., ESPN+		at Northern Iowa	L 58–65	2–1	McLeod Center (3,657); Cedar Falls, IA
November 12, 2025*; 8:30 p.m., Peacock		at Oregon	L 69–83	2–2	Matthew Knight Arena (5,019); Eugene, OR
November 17, 2025*; 7:00 p.m., SLN		Peru State	W 94–46	3–2	First Bank & Trust Arena (1,707); Brookings, SD
November 21, 2025*; 7:00 p.m., SLN		Georgia State; Cancun Challenge	W 105–58	4–2	First Bank & Trust Arena (2,641); Brookings, SD
November 25, 2025*; 5:00 p.m., FloSports		vs. Utah Valley; Cancun Challenge	L 52–75	4–3	Hard Rock Hotel Riviera Maya (300); Riviera Maya, Mexico
November 26, 2025*; 7:30 p.m., FloSports		vs. UC Irvine; Cancun Challenge	L 52–64	4–4	Hard Rock Hotel Riviera Maya (400); Riviera Maya, Mexico
December 3, 2025*; 7:00 p.m., ESPN+		at Northern Arizona; Big Sky–Summit League Challenge	W 75–62	5–4	Walkup Skydome (453); Flagstaff, AZ
December 6, 2025*; 2:00 p.m., Midco Sports/SLN		Idaho; Big Sky–Summit League Challenge	L 81–84	5–5	First Bank & Trust Arena (1,235); Brookings, SD
December 9, 2025*; 6:00 p.m., ESPN+		at Ball State	W 68–64	6–5	Worthen Arena (2,412); Muncie, IN
December 12, 2025*; 7:00 p.m., SLN		Dakota Wesleyan	W 94–62	7–5	First Bank & Trust Arena (1,653); Brookings, SD
December 15, 2025*; 7:00 p.m., Midco Sports Plus		vs. Wyoming	L 72–87	7–6	Sanford Pentagon (1,477); Sioux Falls, SD
December 19, 2025*; 4:00 p.m.		vs. Milwaukee; Milwaukee Hoops Showdown	L 87–88	7–7	Fiserv Forum; Milwaukee, WI
December 29, 2025*; 8:00 p.m., ESPN+		at No. 1 Arizona	L 71–99	7–8	McKale Center (14,501); Tucson, AZ
Summit League regular season
January 1, 2026; 4:15 p.m., Midco Sports/SLN		Omaha	W 84–69	8–8 (1–0)	First Bank & Trust Arena (3,542); Brookings, SD
January 3, 2026; 1:00 p.m., Midco Sports/SLN		at North Dakota	L 87–90 ^{OT}	8–9 (1–1)	Betty Engelstad Sioux Center (1,966); Grand Forks, ND
January 8, 2026; 7:00 p.m., Midco Sports/SLN		Denver	W 87–79	9–9 (2–1)	First Bank & Trust Arena (2,127); Brookings, SD
January 14, 2026; 7:00 p.m., SLN		at North Dakota State	L 65–76	9–10 (2–2)	Scheels Center (3,313); Fargo, ND
January 17, 2026; 4:15 p.m., Midco Sports Two/SLN		Kansas City	W 90–62	10–10 (3–2)	First Bank & Trust Arena (4,451); Brookings, SD
January 22, 2026; 8:00 p.m., SLN		at St. Thomas	L 69–74	10–11 (3–3)	Lee and Penny Anderson Arena (2,322); St. Paul, MN
January 28, 2026; 7:00 p.m., SLN		at Omaha	L 71–80	10–12 (3–4)	Baxter Arena (3,312); Omaha, NE
January 31, 2026; 2:00 p.m., SLN		Oral Roberts	W 95–72	11–12 (4–4)	First Bank & Trust Arena (3,017); Brookings, SD
February 4, 2026; 6:00 p.m., CBSSN		St. Thomas	L 62–77	11–13 (4–5)	First Bank & Trust Arena (2,922); Brookings, SD
February 7, 2026; 5:00 p.m., CBSSN		South Dakota	L 67–68	11–14 (4–6)	First Bank & Trust Arena (4,291); Brookings, SD
February 12, 2026; 8:00 p.m., SLN		at Denver	L 61–79	11–15 (4–7)	Hamilton Gymnasium (1,047); Denver, CO
February 14, 2026; 7:00 p.m., SLN		at Oral Roberts	W 87–69	12–15 (5–7)	Mabee Center (3,074); Tulsa, OK
February 18, 2026; 7:00 p.m., Midco Sports/SLN		North Dakota State	L 66–74	12–16 (5–8)	First Bank & Trust Arena (3,619); Brookings, SD
February 21, 2026; 2:00 p.m., SLN		North Dakota	W 91–83	13–16 (6–8)	First Bank & Trust Arena (3,415); Brookings, SD
February 26, 2026; 7:00 p.m., SLN		at Kansas City	W 73–59	14–16 (7–8)	Swinney Recreation Center (1,031); Kansas City, MO
February 28, 2026; 1:00 p.m., Midco Sports Two/SLN		at South Dakota	L 70–75	14–17 (7–9)	Sanford Coyote Sports Center (3,569); Vermillion, SD
Summit League tournament
March 5, 2026*; 8:25 p.m., SLN	(7)	vs. (2) St. Thomas; Quarterfinal	L 67–80	14–18	Denny Sanford Premier Center (6,614); Sioux Falls, SD
*Non-conference game. ^{#}Rankings from AP Poll. (#) Tournament seedings in parentheses. All times are in Central.
