= 2025–26 Oral Roberts Golden Eagles men's basketball team =

American college basketball season

2025–26 Oral Roberts Golden Eagles men's basketball
- Conference: Summit League
- Record: 10–23 (4–12 Summit)
- Head coach: Kory Barnett (1st season)
- Associate head coach: Kory Alford
- Assistant coaches: Van Green; Donovan Williams; Will Saxon; Isaac Green
- Home arena: Mabee Center

2025–26 Summit League men's basketball standings
	Conf.				Overall
Team	W		L	PCT	W		L	PCT
North Dakota State	14	–	2	.875	25	–	7	.781
St. Thomas	12	–	4	.750	24	–	8	.750
North Dakota	10	–	6	.625	16	–	16	.500
South Dakota	8	–	8	.500	16	–	15	.516
Omaha	8	–	8	.500	15	–	16	.484
Denver	8	–	8	.500	15	–	16	.484
South Dakota State	7	–	9	.438	14	–	18	.438
Oral Roberts	4	–	12	.250	10	–	23	.303
Kansas City	1	–	15	.063	4	–	27	.129
† 2026 Summit League tournament winner As of March 5, 2026

The 2025–26 Oral Roberts Golden Eagles men's basketball team represented Oral Roberts University during the 2025–26 NCAA Division I men's basketball season. The Golden Eagles, who were led by first-year head coach Kory Barnett, played their home games at the Mabee Center in Tulsa, Oklahoma, as members of the Summit League.

The Golden Eagles finished the regular season 9–22 overall, and 4–12 in the Summit League to finish in seventh place. In the Summit League tournament, they defeated Kansas City in the first round, but lost to North Dakota State in the quarterfinals.

== Previous season ==
The Golden Eagles finished the 2024–25 season 7–23, 3–13 in Summit League play, to finish in eighth place. They were defeated by Kansas City in the first round of the Summit League tournament.

On March 7, 2025, the school announced that they would be firing head coach Russell Springmann, after just two seasons at the helm. Three weeks later, on March 28, the school announced that they would be hiring West Virginia assistant coach Kory Barnett as the team's new head coach.

== Roster ==
2025–26 Oral Roberts Golden Eagles men's basketball team
Players
Coaches

Pos.	#	Name	Height	Weight	Year	Previous school	Hometown
G	0	Jack Turner	6 ft 3 in (1.91 m)	165 lb (75 kg)	So	Loyola Chicago	Los Angeles, California
G	1	Ty Harper	6 ft 3 in (1.91 m)	175 lb (79 kg)	GS	Youngstown State	Norcross, Georgia
G	2	Chase Martin	6 ft 4 in (1.93 m)	210 lb (95 kg)	RS Jr	Wofford	Jenks, Oklahoma
G	4	Laymen McGrady	6 ft 4 in (1.93 m)	195 lb (88 kg)	Fr	IMG Academy	Houston, Texas
G	5	Connor Dow	6 ft 6 in (1.98 m)	200 lb (91 kg)	Jr	Oklahoma State	Broken Arrow, Oklahoma
G	6	Cal Furnish	5 ft 10 in (1.78 m)	—	Fr	Crossings Christian School	Edmond, Oklahoma
G	7	Martins Kilups	6 ft 4 in (1.93 m)	—	Fr	Rīgas Tālmācības Vidusskola	Riga, Latvia
G	8	Alex Couto	6 ft 1 in (1.85 m)	—	Fr	Carmel High School	Carmel, Indiana
F	9	Ofri Naveh	6 ft 7 in (2.01 m)	185 lb (84 kg)	RS So	West Virginia	Neot Golan, Israel
F	10	Aaron Jacob	6 ft 8 in (2.03 m)	—	Sr	Cameron	Austin, Texas
G	20	Lane Sparks	6 ft 3 in (1.91 m)	—	GS	Huntington	Dillsboro, Indiana
F	21	Baron Smith Jr.	6 ft 9 in (2.06 m)	220 lb (100 kg)	So	North Texas	Haltom City, Texas
F	25	Luke Gray	6 ft 6 in (1.98 m)	235 lb (107 kg)	So	Oklahoma Christian	Edmond, Oklahoma
F	27	Yuto Yamanouchi-Williams	6 ft 10 in (2.08 m)	230 lb (104 kg)	RS Jr	Nevada	Aizuwakamatsu, Japan

Head coach

- Kory Barnett (Indiana)

Assistant coach(es)

- Kory Alford (UCLA)
- Van Green (Rice)
- Donovan Williams (Park)
- Will Saxon (Oklahoma)
- Isaac Green (Indiana)

Legend

- (C) Team captain
- (S) Suspended
- (I) Ineligible
- (W) Walk-on
- Injured
- Current redshirt

Roster
Last update: November 2, 2025

== Schedule and results ==
Date time, TV	Rank^{#}	Opponent^{#}	Result	Record	Site (attendance) city, state
Exhibition
October 24, 2025*; 7:00 pm		Central Baptist	W 118–63		Mabee Center; Tulsa, OK
Non-conference regular season
November 4, 2025*; 7:00 pm, ESPN+		at Oklahoma State	L 71–95	0–1	Gallagher–Iba Arena (6,211); Stillwater, OK
November 8, 2025*; 7:00 pm, KGEB		John Brown	W 84–50	1–1	Mabee Center; Tulsa, OK
November 12, 2025*; 7:00 pm, KGEB		Tulsa; PSO Mayor’s Cup	L 87–88	1–2	Mabee Center (5,467); Tulsa, OK
November 15, 2025*; 7:00 pm, GEBN		Belmont; Homecoming	L 60–83	1–3	Mabee Center (3,467); Tulsa, OK
November 18, 2025*; 7:00 pm, KGEB		Haskell Indian Nations	W 84–64	2–3	Mabee Center (2,502); Tulsa, OK
November 20, 2025*; 7:00 pm, SECN+		at Oklahoma	L 71–95	2–4	Lloyd Noble Center (5,765); Norman, OK
November 24, 2025*; 6:00 pm, FloSports		at Florida Gulf Coast; GEICO Coconut Hoops (Tarpon Bay Division)	L 88–93	2–5	Alico Arena (1,195); Fort Myers, FL
November 25, 2025*; 3:30 pm, FloSports		vs. Kennesaw State; GEICO Coconut Hoops (Tarpon Bay Division)	W 91–83	3–5	Alico Arena (341); Fort Myers, FL
November 26, 2025*; 3:30 pm, FloSports		vs. Rice; GEICO Coconut Hoops (Tarpon Bay Division)	L 62–81	3–6	Alico Arena (117); Fort Myers, FL
December 3, 2025*; 8:00 pm, ESPN+		at Weber State; Big Sky–Summit League Challenge	L 66–92	3–7	Dee Events Center (2,133); Ogden, UT
December 6, 2025*; 7:00 pm, GEBN		Montana State; Big Sky–Summit League Challenge	W 72–68	4–7	Mabee Center (3,568); Tulsa, OK
December 13, 2025*; 7:00 pm, GEBN		Ecclesia	W 97–52	5–7	Mabee Center (2,867); Tulsa, OK
December 16, 2025*; 7:00 pm, ESPN+		at Missouri State	L 62–63	5–8	Great Southern Bank Arena (1,581); Springfield, MO
December 18, 2025*; 7:00 pm, ESPN+		at TCU	L 53–72	5–9	Schollmaier Arena (4,688); Fort Worth, TX
December 22, 2025*; 7:00 pm, GEBN		UT Arlington	L 57–69	5–10	Mabee Center (4,755); Tulsa, OK
Summit League regular season
January 1, 2026; 1:00 pm, SLN		at North Dakota	L 61–72	5–11 (0–1)	Betty Engelstad Sioux Center (1,565); Grand Forks, ND
January 3, 2026; 3:00 pm, CBSSN		at North Dakota State	L 77–79 ^{2OT}	5–12 (0–2)	Scheels Center (1,714); Fargo, ND
January 10, 2026; 7:00 pm, SLN		St. Thomas	L 71–82	5–13 (0–3)	Mabee Center (3,353); Tulsa, OK
January 14, 2026; 8:00 pm, SLN		at Denver	L 87–98	5–14 (0–4)	Hamilton Gymnasium (1,008); Denver, CO
January 17, 2026; 7:00 pm, SLN		Omaha	L 62–73	5–15 (0–5)	Mabee Center (4,747); Tulsa, OK
January 22, 2026; 7:00 pm, SLN		North Dakota	L 62–79	5–16 (0–6)	Mabee Center (2,513); Tulsa, OK
January 24, 2026; 2:00 pm, SLN		North Dakota State	L 58–86	5–17 (0–7)	Mabee Center (2,191); Tulsa, OK
January 29, 2026; 7:00 pm, SLN		at South Dakota	L 69−77	5−18 (0−8)	Sanford Coyote Sports Center (1,232); Vermillion, SD
January 31, 2026; 2:00 pm, SLN		at South Dakota State	L 72–95	5–19 (0–9)	First Bank and Trust Arena (3,017); Brookings, SD
February 7, 2026; 7:00 pm, SLN		at St. Thomas	L 75–92	5–20 (0–10)	Lee & Penny Anderson Arena (2,612); St. Paul, MN
February 12, 2026; 7:00 pm, SLN		Kansas City	W 69–60	6–20 (1–10)	Mabee Center (2,525); Tulsa, OK
February 14, 2026; 7:00 pm, SLN		South Dakota State	L 69–87	6–21 (1–11)	Mabee Center (3,074); Tulsa, OK
February 18, 2026; 7:00 pm, SLN		at Omaha	L 71–80	6–22 (1–12)	Baxter Arena (3,328); Omaha, NE
February 21, 2026; 7:00 pm, SLN		South Dakota	W 67–62	7–22 (2–12)	Mabee Center (2,574); Tulsa, OK
February 26, 2026; 7:00 pm, SLN		Denver	W 102–80	8–22 (3–12)	Mabee Center (2,435); Tulsa, OK
February 28, 2026; 7:00 pm, SLN		at Kansas City	W 94–70	9–22 (4–12)	Swinney Recreation Center (1,114); Kansas City, MO
Summit League tournament
March 4, 2026*; 7:00 pm, SLN	(8)	vs. (9) Kansas City; First round	W 84–62	10–22	Denny Sanford Premier Center (3,675); Sioux Falls, SD
March 5, 2026*; 6:00 pm, SLN	(8)	vs. (1) North Dakota State; Quarterfinal	L 65–76	10–23	Denny Sanford Premier Center; Sioux Falls, SD
*Non-conference game. ^{#}Rankings from AP Poll. (#) Tournament seedings in parentheses. All times are in Central Time Zone.
