= 2025–26 South Dakota Coyotes men's basketball team =

American college basketball season

2025–26 South Dakota Coyotes men's basketball
- Conference: Summit League
- Record: 16–16 (8–8 Summit)
- Head coach: Eric Peterson (4th season)
- Assistant coaches: Matt Murken; Brandon Ubel; Sean Smith; Triston Simpson; Michael Russell
- Home arena: Sanford Coyote Sports Center

2025–26 Summit League men's basketball standings
	Conf.				Overall
Team	W		L	PCT	W		L	PCT
North Dakota State	14	–	2	.875	25	–	7	.781
St. Thomas	12	–	4	.750	24	–	8	.750
North Dakota	10	–	6	.625	17	–	16	.515
South Dakota	8	–	8	.500	16	–	16	.500
Omaha	8	–	8	.500	16	–	16	.500
Denver	8	–	8	.500	15	–	17	.469
South Dakota State	7	–	9	.438	14	–	18	.438
Oral Roberts	4	–	12	.250	10	–	23	.303
Kansas City	1	–	15	.063	4	–	27	.129
† 2026 Summit League tournament winner As of March 6, 2026

The 2025–26 South Dakota Coyotes men's basketball team represented the University of South Dakota during the 2025–26 NCAA Division I men's basketball season. The Coyotes, who were led by fourth-year head coach Eric Peterson, played home games at the Sanford Coyote Sports Center in Vermillion, South Dakota as members of the Summit League.

The Coyotes finished the regular season 16–15 overall, and 8–8 in the Summit League to finish in fourth place. In the Summit League tournament, they lost to Omaha in the quarterfinals.

== Previous season ==
The Coyotes finished the 2024–25 season 19–14, 9–7 in Summit League play, to finish in fifth place. They defeated North Dakota State, before falling to top-seeded and eventual tournament champions Omaha in the semifinals of the Summit League tournament.

== Roster ==
2025–26 South Dakota Coyotes men's basketball team
Players
Coaches

Pos.	#	Name	Height	Weight	Year	Previous school	Hometown
G	0	Jordan Crawford	6 ft 3 in (1.91 m)	178 lb (81 kg)	Jr	Eastern Kentucky	Charlotte, NC
G	1	Uzziah Buntyn	6 ft 1 in (1.85 m)	—	Fr	Stony Point High School	Round Rock, TX
G	2	Shey Eberwein	6 ft 5 in (1.96 m)	—	RS So	The Woodlands High School	The Woodlands, TX
G	4	Vince Buzelis	6 ft 4 in (1.93 m)	—	Fr	Hinsdale Central High School	Willowbrook, IL
G	5	Luke Bruns	6 ft 2 in (1.88 m)	—	Fr	Dakota Valley High School	North Sioux City, SD
G	10	Evan Anderson	6 ft 4 in (1.93 m)	—	RS Fr	Onalaska High School	Onalaska, WI
G	11	Jesse McIntosh	6 ft 7 in (2.01 m)	—	Fr	Ivanhoe Grammar School	Melbourne, Australia
G	12	Isaac Bruns	6 ft 5 in (1.96 m)	—	Jr	Dakota Valley High School	North Sioux City, SD
G	13	Josiah Dotzler	6 ft 3 in (1.91 m)	185 lb (84 kg)	RS So	Saint Louis	Omaha, NE
F	14	Jonah Funk	6 ft 10 in (2.08 m)	—	Fr	Metamora High School	Metamora, IL
F	21	Ethan Kizer	6 ft 5 in (1.96 m)	230 lb (104 kg)	RS So	South Alabama	Metamora, IL
G	23	Porter Ihnen	6 ft 6 in (1.98 m)	—	RS Fr	Lennox High School	Lennox, SD
G	25	Jalen Hayes	6 ft 2 in (1.88 m)	—	RS So	Richfield High School	Richfield, MN
F	32	Ashton Smith	6 ft 9 in (2.06 m)	260 lb (118 kg)	Sr	Oral Roberts	Spring, TX
F	34	Jake Brack	6 ft 9 in (2.06 m)	—	Jr	Skutt Catholic High School	Omaha, NE
F	35	Caleb Kizer	6 ft 7 in (2.01 m)	230 lb (104 kg)	Sr	South Alabama	Metamora, IL
C	54	Cameron Fens	7 ft 0 in (2.13 m)	255 lb (116 kg)	Sr	UIC	Dubuque, IA

Head coach

- Eric Peterson (UW–La Crosse)

Assistant coach(es)

- Matt Murken (Concordia–Nebraska)
- Brandon Ubel (Nebraska)
- Sean Smith (Trinity International)
- Triston Simpson (South Dakota)
- Michael Russell (Black Hills State)

Legend

- (C) Team captain
- (S) Suspended
- (I) Ineligible
- (W) Walk-on
- Injured
- Current redshirt

Roster
Last update: November 2, 2025

== Schedule and results ==
Date time, TV	Rank^{#}	Opponent^{#}	Result	Record	Site (attendance) city, state
Non-conference regular season
November 3, 2025*; 7:30 pm, SLN		Utah Tech	L 79–81 ^{OT}	0–1	Sanford Coyote Sports Center (1,640); Vermillion, SD
November 5, 2025*; 7:00 pm, Peacock		at No. 23 Creighton	L 76–92	0–2	CHI Health Center Omaha (16,404); Omaha, NE
November 9, 2025*; 1:00 pm, SLN		Ozark Christian	W 121–65	1–2	Sanford Coyote Sports Center (1,060); Vermillion, SD
November 12, 2025*; 7:00 pm, SLN		Southern Indiana	W 89–74	2–2	Sanford Coyote Sports Center (1,263); Vermillion, SD
November 16, 2025*; 1:00 pm, SLN		Western Michigan	W 83–78	3–2	Sanford Coyote Sports Center (1,234); Vermillion, SD
November 20, 2025*; 7:00 pm, SECN+		at Missouri	L 68–102	3–3	Mizzou Arena (8,027); Columbia, MO
November 23, 2025*; 1:00 pm, SLN/Midco Sports		South Carolina State	W 82–81	4–3	Sanford Coyote Sports Center (1,235); Vermillion, SD
November 29, 2025*; 3:00 pm		vs. Air Force	W 80–63	5–3	The Monument (2,348); Rapid City, SD
December 3, 2025*; 7:00 pm, SLN		Portland State; Big Sky–Summit League Challenge	L 71–77	5–4	Sanford Coyote Sports Center (1,324); Vermillion, SD
December 6, 2025*; 7:00 pm, ESPN+		at Northern Colorado; Big Sky–Summit League Challenge	L 87–89 ^{OT}	5–5	Bank of Colorado Arena (1,492); Greeley, CO
December 9, 2025*; 7:30 pm		at Wyoming	L 79–106	5–6	Arena-Auditorium (3,643); Laramie, WY
December 13, 2025*; 1:00 pm, SLN		Prairie View A&M	W 97–85	6–6	Sanford Coyote Sports Center (1,136); Vermillion, SD
December 17, 2025*; 7:00 pm, SLN		Dakota State	W 80–71	7–6	Sanford Coyote Sports Center; Vermillion, SD
December 20, 2025*; 11:00 am, ESPN+		at Kansas State	L 76–106	7–7	Bramlage Coliseum (7,287); Manhattan, KS
December 28, 2025*; 1:00 pm, SLN		Mount Marty	W 85–61	8–7	Sanford Coyote Sports Center (1,262); Vermillion, SD
Summit League regular season
December 31, 2025; 4:00 pm, SLN		at North Dakota State	L 61–84	8–8 (0–1)	Scheels Center (1,982); Fargo, ND
January 7, 2026; 8:00 pm, SLN		at St. Thomas	L 86–99	8–9 (0–2)	Lee & Penny Anderson Arena (2,004); St. Paul, MN
January 10, 2026; 1:00 pm, SLN		Denver	W 82–72	9–9 (1–2)	Sanford Coyote Sports Center (1,291); Vermillion, SD
January 15, 2026; 7:00 pm, SLN		Kansas City	W 99–83	10–9 (2–2)	Sanford Coyote Sports Center (1,760); Vermillion, SD
January 17, 2026; 1:00 pm, Midco Sports/SLN		at North Dakota	L 80–96	10–10 (2–3)	Betty Engelstad Sioux Center (2,012); Grand Forks, ND
January 21, 2026; 7:00 pm, SLN		at Omaha	W 68–64	11–10 (3–3)	Baxter Arena (2,676); Omaha, NE
January 24, 2026; 1:00 pm, SLN		St. Thomas	L 78–90	11–11 (3–4)	Sanford Coyote Sports Center (1,847); Vermillion, SD
January 29, 2026; 7:00 pm, SLN		Oral Roberts	W 77−69	12−11 (4−4)	Sanford Coyote Sports Center (1,232); Vermillion, SD
January 31, 2026; 5:00 pm, SLN		North Dakota State	L 84–89 ^{OT}	12–12 (4–5)	Sanford Coyote Sports Center (1,861); Vermillion, SD
February 4, 2026; 7:00 pm, SLN		at Kansas City	W 82–75 ^{OT}	13–12 (5–5)	Swinney Recreation Center (840); Kansas City, MO
February 7, 2026; 5:00 pm, CBSSN		at South Dakota State	W 68–67	14–12 (6–5)	First Bank and Trust Arena (4,291); Brookings, SD
February 11, 2026; 7:00 pm, SLN		North Dakota	L 71–72	14–13 (6–6)	Sanford Coyote Sports Center (1,706); Vermillion, SD
February 19, 2026; 7:00 pm, SLN		at Denver	L 70–90	14–14 (6–7)	Hamilton Gymnasium (1,172); Denver, CO
February 21, 2026; 7:00 pm, SLN		at Oral Roberts	L 62–67	14–15 (6–8)	Mabee Center (2,574); Tulsa, OK
February 25, 2026; 6:00 pm, CBSSN		Omaha	W 89–72	15–15 (7–8)	Sanford Coyote Sports Center (1,571); Vermillion, SD
February 28, 2026; 1:00 pm, SLN		South Dakota State	W 75–70	16–15 (8–8)	Sanford Coyote Sports Center (3,569); Vermillion, SD
Summit League tournament
March 6, 2026*; 6:00 pm, SLN	(4)	vs. (5) Omaha; Quarterfinal	L 62–76	16–16	Denny Sanford Premier Center (6,723); Sioux Falls, SD
*Non-conference game. ^{#}Rankings from AP Poll. (#) Tournament seedings in parentheses. All times are in Central.
