= 2025–26 St. Thomas Tommies (Minnesota) men's basketball team =

American college basketball season

2025–26 St. Thomas (Minnesota) Tommies men's basketball
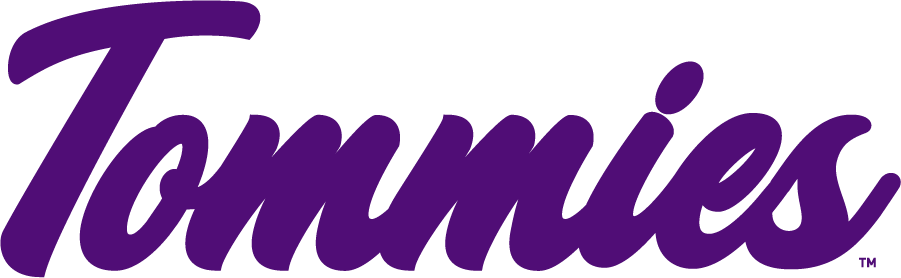

Portland Invitational Champions

NIT First Round, L 52–67 vs Seattle
- Conference: Summit League
- Record: 24–10 (12–4 Summit)
- Head coach: John Tauer (15th season)
- Associate head coach: Mike Maker
- Assistant coaches: Cameron Rundles; Kenneth Lowe
- Home arena: Lee & Penny Anderson Arena

2025–26 Summit League men's basketball standings
	Conf.				Overall
Team	W		L	PCT	W		L	PCT
North Dakota State †	14	–	2	.875	27	–	8	.771
St. Thomas	12	–	4	.750	24	–	10	.706
North Dakota	10	–	6	.625	18	–	17	.514
South Dakota	8	–	8	.500	16	–	16	.500
Omaha	8	–	8	.500	16	–	17	.485
Denver	8	–	8	.500	15	–	17	.469
South Dakota State	7	–	9	.438	14	–	18	.438
Oral Roberts	4	–	12	.250	10	–	23	.303
Kansas City	1	–	15	.063	4	–	27	.129
† 2026 Summit League tournament winner

The 2025–26 St. Thomas Tommies men's basketball team represented the University of St. Thomas in the 2025–26 NCAA Division I men's basketball season. The Tommies were led by 15th-year head coach John Tauer, played their inaugural season at Lee and Penny Anderson Arena (after spending the previous 15 years at Shoenecker Arena). Saint Paul, Minnesota as members of the Summit League.

For the fourth consecutive year, the Tommies won in the Summit League Tournament Quarterfinals defeating 7th seeded South Dakota State, but fell to 3rd seeded North Dakota in the Semifinals.

This season also marked St. Thomas' first season at full NCAA Division I eligibility after they exited their five-year transition period from NCAA Division III a year early, due to a January 2025 NCAA ruling. Despite the Tommies making their first ever postseason appearance in the Division I era they were defeated by Seattle in the first round of the 2026 National Invitation Tournament.

== Previous season ==
The Tommies finished the 2024–25 season 24–10, 12–4 in Summit League play to finish in second place. In the Summit League tournament; the Tommies defeated Denver in the quarterfinals, North Dakota in the semifinals, before falling to Omaha in the championship game. This was St. Thomas' first ever appearance in the Summit League championship game.

== Roster ==
2025–26 St. Thomas (Minnesota) Tommies men's basketball team
Players
Coaches

Pos.	#	Name	Height	Weight	Year	Previous school	Hometown
F	0	Isaiah Johnson-Arigu	6 ft 7 in (2.01 m)	215 lb (98 kg)	So	Totino-Grace High School	Maple Grove, MN
G	1	Hayden Tibbits	5 ft 11 in (1.8 m)	160 lb (73 kg)	RS So	Wayzata High School	Medina, MN
G	2	Jermaine Coleman	6 ft 7 in (2.01 m)	205 lb (93 kg)	RS So	Park Tudor School	Indianapolis, IN
G	3	Ryan Lafferty	6 ft 5 in (1.96 m)	200 lb (91 kg)	So	Mt. Spokane High School	Spokane, WA
G	4	Nolan Minessale	6 ft 5 in (1.96 m)	200 lb (91 kg)	So	Marquette University High School	Brookfield, WI
G	5	Tim Franks	6 ft 5 in (1.96 m)	190 lb (86 kg)	RS Fr	Homestead High School	Mequon, WI
G	10	Tommy Humphries Jr.	6 ft 5 in (1.96 m)	205 lb (93 kg)	RS So	Totino-Grace High School	Minneapolis, MN
G	11	Austin Herro	6 ft 3 in (1.91 m)	180 lb (82 kg)	RS So	Whitnall High School	Milwaukee, WI
G	12	Ryan Dufault	6 ft 0 in (1.83 m)	195 lb (88 kg)	GS	Waseca High School	Waseca, MN
F	13	Luka Momcilovic	6 ft 8 in (2.03 m)	220 lb (100 kg)	Fr	Pewaukee High School	Pewaukee, WI
G	15	Adam Tauer	6 ft 3 in (1.91 m)	185 lb (84 kg)	RS So	Cretin-Derham Hall	St. Paul, MN
G	20	Jack Tauer	6 ft 2 in (1.88 m)	200 lb (91 kg)	GS	Cretin-Derham Hall	St. Paul, MN
G	23	Nick Janowski	6 ft 4 in (1.93 m)	205 lb (93 kg)	RS Fr	Pewaukee High School	Pewaukee, WI
F	24	Kyle Counts	6 ft 7 in (2.01 m)	210 lb (95 kg)	RS Fr	Wilsonville High School	Wilsonville, OR
F	32	Carter Bjerke	6 ft 9 in (2.06 m)	255 lb (116 kg)	RS Jr	Wayzata High School	Plymouth, MN
F	34	Ben Oosterbaan	6 ft 6 in (1.98 m)	200 lb (91 kg)	RS So	Hinsdale Central High School	Hinsdale, IL

Head coach

- John Tauer (St. Thomas (MN))

Assistant coach(es)

- Mike Maker (Cal Baptist)
- Cameron Rundles (Wofford)
- Kenneth Lowe (Purdue)

Legend

- (C) Team captain
- (S) Suspended
- (I) Ineligible
- (W) Walk-on
- Injured
- Current redshirt

Roster
Last update: October 25, 2025

== Schedule and results ==
They entered their January 29 contest against North Dakota with the nation's longest active NCAA Division I men's basketball home win streak. Despite posting a tie-breaking three point shot with 22 seconds remaining, they surrendered a layup with 10 seconds and turned the ball over for another basket with 7 seconds remaining.

Date time, TV	Rank^{#}	Opponent^{#}	Result	Record	High points	High rebounds	High assists	Site (attendance) city, state
Non-conference regular season
November 3, 2025*; 9:00 p.m., ESPN+		at Saint Mary's	L 58–84	0–1	24 – Minessale	5 – Tied (2)	3 – Bjerke	University Credit Union Pavilion (3,327); Moraga, CA
November 8, 2025*; 7:00 p.m., FOX 9+/SLN		Army; Opening Night at Lee and Penny Anderson Arena	W 83–76	1–1	20 – Minessale	5 – Janowski	6 – Minessale	Lee and Penny Anderson Arena (5,325); St. Paul, MN
November 10, 2025*; 8:30 p.m., ESPN+		at Washington State	L 71–81	1–2	22 – Janowski	4 – Johnson-Arigu	4 – Minessale	Beasley Coliseum (2,845); Pullman, WA
November 13, 2025*; 7:00 p.m., SLN		Green Bay	W 80–61	2–2	20 – Minessale	6 – Minessale	4 – Tied (2)	Lee and Penny Anderson Arena (2,658); St. Paul, MN
November 15, 2025*; 2:00 p.m., ESPN+		at Southeast Missouri State	W 84–72	3–2	24 – Minessale	6 – Minessale	5 – Herro	Show Me Center (1,750); Cape Girardeau, MO
November 21, 2025*; 6:30 p.m.		vs. Northern Colorado; Portland Invitational	W 73–72	4–2	20 – Minessale	5 – Tied (2)	5 – Minessale	Chiles Center (450); Portland, OR
November 22, 2025*; 4:30 p.m.		vs. Cal State Fullerton; Portland Invitational	L 80–88	4–3	26 – Minessale	5 – Tied (3)	5 – Minessale	Chiles Center (450); Portland, OR
November 23, 2025*; 3:00 p.m., ESPN+		at Portland; Portland Invitational	W 76–66	5–3	24 – Minessale	6 – Bjerke	4 – Oosterbaan	Chiles Center (983); Portland, OR
November 29, 2025*; 7:00 p.m., SLN		Lawrence	W 87–52	6–3	18 – Bjerke	7 – Coleman	7 – Tibbits	Lee and Penny Anderson Arena (1,988); St. Paul, MN
December 3, 2025*; 8:00 p.m., ESPN+		at Montana State; Big Sky–Summit League Challenge	L 74–82	6–4	22 – Janowski	11 – Janowski	4 – Minessale	Brick Breeden Fieldhouse (2,543); Bozeman, MT
December 7, 2025*; 12:00 p.m., SLN		Weber State; Big Sky–Summit League Challenge (Rescheduled from December 6)	W 88–65	7–4	32 – Minessale	6 – Johnson-Arigu	6 – Dufault	Lee and Penny Anderson Arena (1,998); St. Paul, MN
December 11, 2025*; 7:00 p.m., SLN		St. John's (MN)	W 80–56	8–4	30 – Minessale	11 – Minessale	3 – Minessale	Lee and Penny Anderson Arena (5,325); St. Paul, MN
December 13, 2025*; 1:00 p.m., ESPN+		at UNC Asheville	W 80–59	9–4	23 – Minessale	7 – Tied (2)	4 – Tied (2)	Kimmel Arena (723); Asheville, NC
December 20, 2025*; 7:00 p.m., SLN		UC Riverside	W 92–78	10–4	27 – Minessale	4 – Tied (3)	7 – Janowski	Lee and Penny Anderson Arena (1,780); St. Paul, MN
December 28, 2025*; 1:00 p.m., SLN		North Central (MN)	W 105–59	11–4	22 – Minessale	13 – Janowski	5 – Tied (2)	Lee and Penny Anderson Arena (1,646); St. Paul, MN
Summit League regular season
January 4, 2026; 12:00 p.m., SLN		Denver; Game rescheduled from January 3	W 92–88	12–4 (1–0)	31 – Janowski	7 – Janowski	6 – Minessale	Lee and Penny Anderson Arena (2,541); St. Paul, MN
January 7, 2026; 8:00 p.m., FOX 9+/SLN		South Dakota	W 99–86	13–4 (2–0)	25 – Johnson-Arigu	4 – Tied (5)	12 – Minessale	Lee and Penny Anderson Arena (2,004); St. Paul, MN
January 10, 2026; 7:00 p.m., SLN		at Oral Roberts	W 82–71	14–4 (3–0)	23 – Janowski	12 – Janowski	3 – Minessale	Mabee Center (3,353); Tulsa, OK
January 15, 2026; 7:00 p.m., SLN		at North Dakota	W 91–80	15–4 (4–0)	32 – Janowski	5 – Tied (2)	10 – Herro	Betty Engelstad Sioux Center (2,390); Grand Forks, ND
January 17, 2026; 1:00 p.m., SLN		at North Dakota State	L 65–68	15–5 (4–1)	16 – Minessale	5 – Tied (4)	6 – Minessale	Scheels Center (2,954); Fargo, ND
January 22, 2026; 8:00 p.m., FOX 9+/SLN		South Dakota State	W 74–69	16–5 (5–1)	21 – Tied (2)	6 – Tied (2)	3 – Tied (4)	Lee and Penny Anderson Arena (2,322); St. Paul, MN
January 24, 2026; 1:00 p.m., SLN		at South Dakota	W 90–78	17–5 (6–1)	23 – Janowski	9 – Herro	4 – Minessale	Sanford Coyote Sports Center (1,847); Vermillion, SD
January 29, 2026; 7:00 p.m., SLN		North Dakota	L 80–81	17–6 (6–2)	24 – Minessale	8 – Herro	6 – Herro	Lee and Penny Anderson Arena (2,538); St. Paul, MN
February 1, 2026; 1:00 p.m., CBSSN		Kansas City	W 99–64	18–6 (7–2)	30 – Bjerke	5 – Tied (4)	8 – Herro	Lee and Penny Anderson Arena (2,552); St. Paul, MN
February 4, 2026; 6:00 p.m., CBSSN		at South Dakota State	W 77–62	19–6 (8–2)	26 – Minessale	8 – Minessale	4 – Minessale	First Bank & Trust Arena (2,922); Brookings, SD
February 7, 2026; 7:00 p.m., SLN		Oral Roberts	W 92–75	20–6 (9–2)	28 – Minessale	9 – Oosterbaan	3 – Minessale	Lee and Penny Anderson Arena (2,612); St. Paul, MN
February 12, 2026; 7:00 p.m., SLN		at Omaha	L 94–98	20–7 (9–3)	19 – Johnson-Arigu	6 – Tied (2)	9 – Minessale	Baxter Arena (3,617); Omaha, NE
February 14, 2026; 7:00 p.m., SLN		at Kansas City	W 104–64	21–7 (10–3)	25 – Minessale	7 – Minessale	5 – Minessale	Swinney Recreation Center (773); Kansas City, MO
February 21, 2026; 5:00 p.m., SLN		at Denver	L 80–82	21–8 (10–4)	19 – Janowski	6 – Janowski	5 – Minessale	Hamilton Gymnasium (1,594); Denver, CO
February 26, 2026; 8:00 p.m., FOX 9+/SLN		North Dakota State	W 84–62	22–8 (11–4)	21 – Tied (2)	7 – Minessale	6 – Minessale	Lee and Penny Anderson Arena (4,708); St. Paul, MN
February 28, 2026; 8:00 p.m., SLN		Omaha	W 68–53	23–8 (12–4)	20 – Minessale	8 – Herro	5 – Herro	Lee and Penny Anderson Arena (2,911); St. Paul, MN
Summit League tournament
March 5, 2026; 8:25 p.m., SLN	(2)	vs. (7) South Dakota State; Quarterfinals	W 80–67	24–8	23 – Oosterbaan	8 – Minessale	6 – Minessale	Denny Sanford Premier Center (6,614); Sioux Falls, SD
March 7, 2026; 9:45 p.m., CBSSN	(2)	vs. (3) North Dakota; Semifinals	L 66–67	24–9	23 – Minessale	9 – Minessale	7 – Herro	Denny Sanford Premier Center (6,684); Sioux Falls, SD
National Invitational Tournament
March 17, 2026*; 9:00 pm, ESPN+		at (4 AU) Seattle; First round	L 52–67	24–10	15 – Minessale	9 – Oosterbaan	3 – Tied (2)	Redhawk Center (686); Seattle, WA
*Non-conference game. ^{#}Rankings from AP poll. (#) Tournament seedings in parentheses. AU=Auburn. All times are in Central.
