= 2025–26 North Dakota Fighting Hawks men's basketball team =

American college basketball season

2025–26 North Dakota Fighting Hawks men's basketball
- Conference: Summit League
- Record: 18–17 (10–6 Summit)
- Head coach: Paul Sather (7th season)
- Assistant coaches: Jamie Stevens; Ty Danielson; Estevan Sandoval
- Home arena: Betty Engelstad Sioux Center

2025–26 Summit League men's basketball standings
	Conf.				Overall
Team	W		L	PCT	W		L	PCT
North Dakota State †	14	–	2	.875	27	–	8	.771
St. Thomas	12	–	4	.750	24	–	10	.706
North Dakota	10	–	6	.625	18	–	17	.514
South Dakota	8	–	8	.500	16	–	16	.500
Omaha	8	–	8	.500	16	–	17	.485
Denver	8	–	8	.500	15	–	17	.469
South Dakota State	7	–	9	.438	14	–	18	.438
Oral Roberts	4	–	12	.250	10	–	23	.303
Kansas City	1	–	15	.063	4	–	27	.129
† 2026 Summit League tournament winner

The 2025–26 North Dakota Fighting Hawks men's basketball team represented the University of North Dakota during the 2025–26 NCAA Division I men's basketball season as members of the Summit League. The Fighting Hawks were led by seventh-year head coach Paul Sather and played their home games at the Betty Engelstad Sioux Center in Grand Forks, North Dakota.

== Previous season ==
The Fighting Hawks finished the 2024–25 season 12–21, 5–11 in Summit League play, to finish in a tie for sixth place. They made it to the semifinal round of the Summit League tournament, where they lost to St. Thomas by a score of 69–85.

== Offseason ==
=== Departures ===
North Dakota departures
Name	Number	Pos.	Height	Weight	Year	Hometown	Reason for departures
Mier Panoam	3	G	6'2"	200	Sophomore	Anchorage, AK	Transferred to Xavier
Dariyus Woodson	4	F	6'7"	220	Junior	Baytown, TX	Transferred to Louisiana
Deng Mayar	5	F	6'8"	180	Senior	Salt Lake City, UT	Transferred to Omaha
Amar Kuljuhovic	9	F/C	6'8"	225	Senior	Waterloo, IA	Transferred to Missouri State
Mambourou Mara	21	F	6'6"	190	Sophomore	Conakry, Guinea	Transferred to Houston Christian
Brian Matthews	34	F	6'10"	240	Senior	Chicago, IL	Out of eligibility
Treysen Eaglestaff	52	G	6'6"	190	Junior	Bismarck, ND	Transferred to West Virginia

=== Incoming transfers ===
North Dakota incoming transfers
Name	Number	Pos.	Height	Weight	Year	Hometown	Previous School
Garrett Anderson	16	G	6'6"	195	Senior	Phoenix, AZ	Central Washington
Josh Jones	22	C	6'9"	245	Junior	Austin, TX	Oral Roberts
Wylee Delorme	23	G	6'5"	200	Sophomore	Devils Lake, ND	UMary

=== Recruiting class ===
==== 2025 recruiting class ====
College recruiting
Name	Hometown	School	Height	Weight	Commit date
Marley Curtis #0 Forward	St. Louis Park, MN	St. Louis Park HS	6 ft 8 in (2.03 m)	230 lb (100 kg)	
Marley Curtis #0 Forward	Recruit ratings: No ratings found				
Karson Ouse #4 Forward	Kindred, ND	Kindred HS	6 ft 7 in (2.01 m)	190 lb (86 kg)	
Karson Ouse #4 Forward	Recruit ratings: No ratings found				
Anthony Smith III #9 Guard	Hopkins, MN	Hopkins HS	6 ft 1 in (1.85 m)	170 lb (77 kg)	
Anthony Smith III #9 Guard	Recruit ratings: No ratings found				
Micah Curtis #10 Forward	St. Louis Park, MN	St. Louis Park HS	6 ft 8 in (2.03 m)	230 lb (100 kg)	
Micah Curtis #10 Forward	Recruit ratings: No ratings found				
Overall recruit ranking:
Note: In many cases, Scout, Rivals, 247Sports, On3, and ESPN may conflict in their listings of height and weight.; In these cases, the average was taken. ESPN grades are on a 100-point scale.; Sources:

== Roster ==
2025–26 North Dakota Fighting Hawks men's basketball team
Players
Coaches

Pos.	#	Name	Height	Weight	Year	Hometown
F	0	Marley Curtis	6 ft 8 in (2.03 m)	230 lb (104 kg)	Fr	St. Louis Park, MN
G	1	Zach Kraft	6 ft 3 in (1.91 m)	185 lb (84 kg)	So	Grand Forks, ND
G	2	Eli King	6 ft 3 in (1.91 m)	193 lb (88 kg)	Sr	Caledonia, MN
G	3	Greyson Uelmen	6 ft 2 in (1.88 m)	185 lb (84 kg)	Fr	Excelsior, MN
G	4	Karson Ouse	6 ft 7 in (2.01 m)	190 lb (86 kg)	Fr	Kindred, ND
F	5	Matthew Bothun	6 ft 9 in (2.06 m)	220 lb (100 kg)	So	St. Francis, MN
G	9	Anthony Smith III	6 ft 1 in (1.85 m)	170 lb (77 kg)	Fr	Hopkins, MN
F	10	Micah Curtis	6 ft 8 in (2.03 m)	230 lb (104 kg)	Fr	St. Louis Park, MN
G	11	Reggie Thomas	6 ft 1 in (1.85 m)	200 lb (91 kg)	Sr	Omaha, NE
F	13	George Natsvishvili	6 ft 10 in (2.08 m)	239 lb (108 kg)	Jr	Georgia
F/C	15	Ryan Erikson	6 ft 10 in (2.08 m)	250 lb (113 kg)	So	Bismarck, ND
G	16	Garrett Anderson	6 ft 6 in (1.98 m)	195 lb (88 kg)	Sr	Phoenix, AZ
C	22	Josh Jones	6 ft 9 in (2.06 m)	245 lb (111 kg)	Jr	Austin, TX
G	23	Wylee Delorme	6 ft 5 in (1.96 m)	200 lb (91 kg)	So	Devils Lake, ND
G	33	Anthony Doppler	6 ft 4 in (1.93 m)	200 lb (91 kg)	So	Bismarck, ND

Head coach

- Paul Sather (Northern State)

Assistant coach(es)

- Jamie Stevens (MSU Billings)
- Ty Danielson (Nebraska-Kearney)
- Estevan Sandoval (New Mexico)

Legend

- (C) Team captain
- (S) Suspended
- (I) Ineligible
- (W) Walk-on
- Injured
- Current redshirt

Roster
Last update: October 19, 2025

== Schedule and results ==
Date time, TV	Rank^{#}	Opponent^{#}	Result	Record	High points	High rebounds	High assists	Site (attendance) city, state
Exhibition
October 18, 2025*; 1:00 p.m.		Jamestown	W 82–61	–	12 – Tied (3)	6 – Smith III	3 – Smith III	Betty Engelstad Sioux Center; Grand Forks, ND
October 25, 2025*; 12:00 p.m., BIG+		at Minnesota	L 62–82	–	14 – Anderson	4 – Ma. Curtis	3 – Smith III	Williams Arena (7,512); Minneapolis, MN
Non-conference regular season
November 3, 2025*; 7:00 p.m., SECN+		at No. 15 Alabama	L 62–91	0–1	13 – Anderson	6 – King	4 – Smith III	Coleman Coliseum (13,474); Tuscaloosa, AL
November 6, 2025*; 7:00 p.m., Summit League Network		UC Riverside	L 70–74	0–2	17 – Smith III	6 – Nastvlishvili	6 – Uelmen	Betty Engelstad Sioux Center (1,533); Grand Forks, ND
November 9, 2025*; 1:00 p.m., SLN		Cal State Northridge	L 85–93	0–3	24 – Uelmen	5 – Jones	6 – Smith III	Betty Engelstad Sioux Center (1,479); Grand Forks, ND
November 11, 2025*; 7:00 p.m., SLN		Mayville State	W 128–58	1–3	22 – Mi. Curtis	8 – Ma. Curtis	7 – Smith III	Betty Engelstad Sioux Center (1,721); Grand Forks, ND
November 15, 2025*; 4:00 p.m., ESPN+		at UC Riverside	W 76–74	2–3	18 – Uelmen	6 – Tied (2)	4 – Smith III	UC Riverside Student Recreation Center (375); Riverside, CA
November 19, 2025*; 7:00 p.m., ESPN+		at Creighton	L 60–75	2–4	14 – Ma. Curtis	7 – Natsvlishvili	3 – Anderson	CHI Health Center Omaha (16,059); Omaha, NE
November 22, 2025*; 6:00 p.m., ESPN+		vs. Coastal Carolina; Western Illinois Multiple Team Event	L 58–75	2–5	13 – Uelmen	10 – Ma. Curtis	2 – Natsvlishvili	Western Hall (165); Macomb, IL
November 23, 2025*; 6:00 p.m., ESPN+		at Western Illinois; Western Illinois Multiple Team Event	W 78–69	3–5	21 – Anderson	6 – Ma. Curtis	4 – Uelmen	Western Hall (722); Macomb, IL
November 28, 2025*; 11:00 p.m., ESPN+		at Hawaii	L 55–92	3–6	19 – Uelmen	6 – Uelmen	2 – Tied (2)	Stan Sheriff Center (4,088); Honolulu, HI
December 3, 2025*; 8:00 p.m., ESPN+		at Idaho; Big Sky–Summit League Challenge	L 58–90	3–7	15 – Ma. Curtis	6 – King	3 – King	Idaho Central Credit Union Arena (1,636); Moscow, ID
December 6, 2025*; 7:00 p.m., SLN		Montana; Big Sky–Summit League Challenge	L 75–79	3–8	19 – Natsvlishvili	10 – Natsvlishvili	3 – Uelmen	Betty Engelstad Sioux Center (1,649); Grand Forks, ND
December 10, 2025*; 7:00 p.m., SLN		Crown (MN)	W 89–43	4–8	17 – Natsvlishvili	7 – King	4 – Uelmen	Betty Engelstad Sioux Center (1,470); Grand Forks, ND
December 13, 2025*; 1:00 p.m., SLN		Western Illinois	L 66–69 ^{OT}	4–9	13 – Tied (2)	6 – Anderson	2 – Tied (4)	Betty Engelstad Sioux Center (1,528); Grand Forks, ND
December 18, 2025*; 7:00 p.m., SLN		Winthrop	W 90–88	5–9	25 – King	9 – Anderson	3 – Anderson	Betty Engelstad Sioux Center (312); Grand Forks, ND
December 21, 2025*; 7:00 p.m., BTN		at No. 15 Nebraska	L 55–78	5–10	13 – King	6 – Tied (2)	4 – Smith III	Pinnacle Bank Arena (14,519); Lincoln, NE
December 28, 2025*; 1:00 p.m., SLN		Dakota State	W 88–56	6–10	15 – Bothun	7 – Ma. Curtis	3 – Tied (2)	Betty Engelstad Sioux Center (1,574); Grand Forks, ND
Summit League regular season
January 1, 2026; 1:00 p.m., SLN		Oral Roberts	W 72–61	7–10 (1–0)	19 – Natsvlishvili	10 – King	2 – Tied (2)	Betty Engelstad Sioux Center (1,565); Grand Forks, ND
January 3, 2026; 1:00 p.m., SLN		South Dakota State	W 90–87 ^{OT}	8–10 (2–0)	17 – Uelmen	6 – Delorme	5 – Smith III	Betty Engelstad Sioux Center (1,966); Grand Forks, ND
January 8, 2026; 7:00 p.m., SLN		at Omaha	L 79–90	8–11 (2–1)	21 – King	6 – Natsvlishvili	2 – Tied (2)	Baxter Arena (2,072); Omaha, NE
January 10, 2026; 7:00 p.m., SLN		at Kansas City	W 81–79	9–11 (3–1)	22 – Anderson	11 – Jones	4 – Uelmen	Swinney Recreation Center (672); Kansas City, MO
January 15, 2026; 7:00 p.m., SLN		St. Thomas	L 80–91	9–12 (3–2)	19 – Tied (2)	6 – King	3 – Kraft	Betty Engelstad Sioux Center (2,390); Grand Forks, ND
January 17, 2026; 1:00 p.m., SLN		South Dakota	W 96–80	10–12 (4–2)	26 – Uelmen	7 – Anderson	6 – King	Betty Engelstad Sioux Center (2,012); Grand Forks, ND
January 22, 2026; 7:00 p.m., SLN		at Oral Roberts	W 79–62	11–12 (5–2)	22 – Kraft	7 – King	5 – King	Mabee Center (2,513); Tulsa, OK
January 24, 2026; 3:00 p.m., SLN		at Denver	W 93–86	12–12 (6–2)	30 – Uelmen	8 – King	2 – Tied (2)	Hamilton Gymnasium (1,137); Denver, CO
January 29, 2026; 7:00 p.m., SLN		at St. Thomas	W 81–80	13–12 (7–2)	20 – Anderson	6 – Tied (2)	3 – Tied (3)	Lee & Penny Anderson Arena; St. Paul, MN
February 5, 2026; 7:00 p.m., SLN		Omaha	W 76–73	14–12 (8–2)	21 – Uelmen	10 – King	3 – Uelmen	Betty Engelstad Sioux Center (1,836); Grand Forks, ND
February 7, 2026; 1:00 p.m., SLN		Denver	L 79–98	14–13 (8–3)	24 – Uelmen	6 – King	3 – King	Betty Engelstad Sioux Center (2,238); Grand Forks, ND
February 11, 2026; 7:00 p.m., SLN		at South Dakota	W 72–71	15–13 (9–3)	24 – Uelmen	11 – Natsvlishvili	3 – Uelmen	Sanford Coyote Sports Center (1,706); Vermillion, SD
February 14, 2026; 1:00 p.m., CBSSN		North Dakota State	L 66–83	15–14 (9–4)	16 – Uelmen	6 – King	4 – Uelmen	Betty Engelstad Sioux Center (2,918); Grand Forks, ND
February 19, 2026; 7:00 p.m., SLN		Kansas City	W 85–70	16–14 (10–4)	23 – Uelmen	8 – Tied (2)	7 – Uelmen	Betty Engelstad Sioux Center (1,867); Grand Forks, ND
February 21, 2026; 2:00 p.m., SLN		at South Dakota State	L 83–91	16–15 (10–5)	19 – Uelmen	7 – Anderson	8 – Smith III	First Bank & Trust Arena (3,415); Brookings, SD
February 28, 2026; 4:00 p.m., SLN		at North Dakota State	L 63–96	16–16 (10–6)	12 – Uelmen	6 – Natsvilishvili	3 – Smith III	Scheels Center (5,426); Fargo, ND
Summit League tournament
March 6, 2026*; 8:35 p.m., SLN	(3)	vs. (6) Denver; Quarterfinal	W 83–67	17–16	41 – Uelmen	8 – Curtis	3 – Tied (2)	Denny Sanford Premier Center (6,723); Sioux Falls, SD
March 7, 2026*; 9:45 p.m., CBSSN	(3)	vs. (2) St. Thomas; Semifinal	W 67–66	18–16	28 – Uelmen	7 – Natsvishvili	3 – Natsvishvili	Denny Sanford Premier Center (6,684); Sioux Falls, SD
March 8, 2026*; 8:00 p.m., CBSSN	(3)	vs. (1) North Dakota State; Championship	L 62–70	18–17	Uelmen – 24	9 – Anderson	4 – Uelmen	Denny Sanford Premier Center (5,937); Sioux Falls, SD
*Non-conference game. ^{#}Rankings from AP poll. (#) Tournament seedings in parentheses. All times are in Central.
