= 2025–26 Omaha Mavericks men's basketball team =

American college basketball season

2025–26 Omaha Mavericks men's basketball
- Conference: Summit League
- Record: 16–17 (8–8 Summit)
- Head coach: Chris Crutchfield (4th season)
- Assistant coaches: Kyan Brown; Keenan Holdman; J.R. Reynolds
- Home arena: Baxter Arena

2025–26 Summit League men's basketball standings
	Conf.				Overall
Team	W		L	PCT	W		L	PCT
North Dakota State	14	–	2	.875	26	–	7	.788
St. Thomas	12	–	4	.750	24	–	8	.750
North Dakota	10	–	6	.625	17	–	16	.515
South Dakota	8	–	8	.500	16	–	16	.500
Omaha	8	–	8	.500	16	–	17	.485
Denver	8	–	8	.500	15	–	17	.469
South Dakota State	7	–	9	.438	14	–	18	.438
Oral Roberts	4	–	12	.250	10	–	23	.303
Kansas City	1	–	15	.063	4	–	27	.129
† 2026 Summit League tournament winner As of March 7, 2026

The 2025–26 Omaha Mavericks men's basketball team represented the University of Nebraska Omaha in the 2025–26 NCAA Division I men's basketball season. The Mavericks, who were led by third-year head coach Chris Crutchfield, played their home games at Baxter Arena in Omaha, Nebraska as members of the Summit League.

The Mavericks finished the regular season 15–16 overall, and 8–8 in the Summit League to finish in fifth place. In the Summit League tournament, they defeated South Dakota in the quarterfinals, but lost to North Dakota State in the semifinals.

== Previous season ==
The Mavericks finished the 2024–25 season 22–13, 13–3 in Summit League play, to win the program's first-ever regular season Summit League title. In the Summit League tournament, the Mavericks defeated Kansas City in the quarterfinals, South Dakota in the semifinals, and St. Thomas in the championship game to win their first tournament title. As a result, they received the conference's automatic bid to the NCAA tournament as the No. 15 seed in the West region. There they lost to St. John's in the first round.

== Roster ==
2025–26 Omaha Mavericks men's basketball team
Players
Coaches

Pos.	#	Name	Height	Weight	Year	Previous school	Hometown
F	0	Benji Nelson	6 ft 8 in (2.03 m)	171 lb (78 kg)	So	Northern Oklahoma	Wahoo, NE
G	1	Rob Matos	5 ft 9 in (1.75 m)	175 lb (79 kg)	Jr	Molloy	Fredericksburg, VA
F	2	Julian Margrave	6 ft 10 in (2.08 m)	230 lb (104 kg)	Sr	South Alabama	Louisburg, KS
G	3	Grant Stubblefield	6 ft 1 in (1.85 m)	190 lb (86 kg)	Jr	Blue Valley Northwest High School	Overland Park, KS
G	5	Ja'Sean Glover	6 ft 5 in (1.96 m)	205 lb (93 kg)	Sr	Madelia High School	Madelia, MN
G	7	Lance Waddles	6 ft 4 in (1.93 m)	200 lb (91 kg)	Sr	North Dakota State	Shreveport, LA
F	10	Deng Mayar	6 ft 7 in (2.01 m)	180 lb (82 kg)	GS	North Dakota	Salt Lake City, UT
G	11	Paul Djobet	6 ft 7 in (2.01 m)	215 lb (98 kg)	Jr	Mimai (FL)	Lille, France
G	12	Aidan Skradis	6 ft 4 in (1.93 m)	185 lb (84 kg)	So	Elkhorn South High School	Elkhorn, NE
C	15	Christian Richardson	7 ft 1 in (2.16 m)	230 lb (104 kg)	Sr	Long Beach State	Rancho Cucamonga, CA
F	21	Valentino Simon	6 ft 6 in (1.98 m)	200 lb (91 kg)	Sr	Hutchinson CC	Nassau, Bahamas
F	22	Kamryn Thomas	6 ft 8 in (2.03 m)	205 lb (93 kg)	Sr	Hutchinson CC	Chicago, IL
C	24	Isaac Ondekane	6 ft 8 in (2.03 m)	250 lb (113 kg)	GS	Lindenwood	Kinshasa, Congo
G	25	Khamani Cooper	6 ft 4 in (1.93 m)	190 lb (86 kg)	Jr	Connors State	Pine Bluff, AR
G	32	Tony Osburn	6 ft 2 in (1.88 m)	200 lb (91 kg)	Sr	Mound City High School	Fairfax, MO
F	44	Brock Scholl	6 ft 8 in (2.03 m)	220 lb (100 kg)	Fr	Skutt Catholic High School	Omaha, NE

Head coach

- Chris Crutchfield (Omaha)

Assistant coach(es)

- Kyan Brown (Oral Roberts)
- J. R. Reynolds (Virginia)
- Keenan Holdman (Hardin–Simmons)

Legend

- (C) Team captain
- (S) Suspended
- (I) Ineligible
- (W) Walk-on
- Injured
- Current redshirt

Roster
Last update: October 13, 2025

== Schedule and results ==
Date time, TV	Rank^{#}	Opponent^{#}	Result	Record	Site (attendance) city, state
Non-conference regular season
November 3, 2025*; 12:30 p.m., Field of 68 YouTube		vs. Murray State; Field of 68 Opening Day Marathon	L 77−85	0−1	Sanford Pentagon (1,013); Sioux Falls, SD
November 6, 2025*; 7:00 p.m., ESPN+		at Abilene Christian	L 71–73	0–2	Moody Coliseum (1,025); Abilene, TX
November 9, 2025*; 5:00 p.m., MW Network		at Colorado State	L 74–97	0–3	Moby Arena (6,405); Fort Collins, CO
November 15, 2025*; 7:00 p.m., Summit League Network		Southern Utah	W 90–85	1–3	Baxter Arena (3,515); Omaha, NE
November 19, 2025*; 7:00 p.m., SLN		Concordia (NE)	W 96–80	2–3	Baxter Arena (2,139); Omaha, NE
November 21, 2025*; 7:00 p.m., SECN+		at LSU	L 73−99	2−4	Pete Maravich Assembly Center (6,829); Baton Rouge, LA
November 25, 2025*; 6:00 p.m., ESPN+		vs. James Madison	L 77−88	2−5	Ocean Bank Convocation Center (99); Miami, FL
November 26, 2025*; 1:00 p.m., ESPN+		at FIU	L 61−74	2−6	Ocean Bank Convocation Center (328); Miami, FL
November 29, 2025*; 7:00 p.m., SLN		Mid–American Christian	W 84−62	3−6	Baxter Arena (2,205); Omaha, NE
December 3, 2025*; 7:00 p.m., SLN		Northern Colorado; Big Sky–Summit League Challenge	L 70–75	3–7	Baxter Arena (2,350); Omaha, NE
December 6, 2025*; 4:00 p.m., ESPN+		at Portland State; Big Sky–Summit League Challenge	W 60–55	4–7	Viking Pavilion (572); Portland, OR
December 9, 2025*; 7:00 p.m., SLN		Doane (NE)	W 79–70	5–7	Baxter Arena; Omaha, NE
December 16, 2025*; 7:00 p.m., SLN		York (NE)	W 105–58	6–7	Baxter Arena (2,517); Omaha, NE
December 20, 2025*; 6:00 p.m., ESPN+		at Lamar	W 85–82 ^{OT}	7–7	Montagne Center (1,120); Beaumont, TX
December 28, 2025*; 7:00 p.m., BTN		at Oregon	L 57–80	7–8	Matthew Knight Arena (5,392); Eugene, OR
Summit League regular season
January 1, 2026; 4:15 p.m., SLN		at South Dakota State	L 69–84	7–9 (0–1)	First Bank & Trust Arena (3,542); Brookings, SD
January 3, 2026; 7:00 p.m., SLN		Kansas City	L 66–73	7–10 (0–2)	Baxter Arena (3,324); Omaha, NE
January 8, 2026; 7:00 p.m., SLN		North Dakota	W 90–79	8–10 (1–2)	Baxter Arena (2,072); Omaha, NE
January 10, 2026; 1:00 p.m., SLN		North Dakota State	L 76–78	8–11 (1–3)	Baxter Arena (3,669); Omaha, NE
January 17, 2026; 7:00 p.m., SLN		at Oral Roberts	W 73–62	9–11 (2–3)	Mabee Center (4,747); Tulsa, OK
January 21, 2026; 7:00 p.m., SLN		South Dakota	L 64–68	9–12 (2–4)	Baxter Arena (2,676); Omaha, NE
January 24, 2026; 7:00 p.m., SLN		at Kansas City	W 77–60	10–12 (3–4)	Swinney Recreation Center (405); Kansas City, MO
January 28, 2026; 7:00 p.m., SLN		South Dakota State	W 80–71	11–12 (4–4)	Baxter Arena (3,312); Omaha, NE
January 31, 2026; 3:00 p.m., SLN		at Denver	W 84–82	12–12 (5–4)	Hamilton Gymnasium (1,037); Denver, CO
February 5, 2026; 7:00 p.m., SLN		at North Dakota	L 73–76	12–13 (5–5)	Betty Engelstad Sioux Center (1,836); Grand Forks, ND
February 7, 2026; 1:00 p.m., SLN		at North Dakota State	L 84–92	12–14 (5–6)	Scheels Center (2,323); Fargo, ND
February 12, 2026; 7:00 p.m., SLN		St. Thomas	W 98–94	13–14 (6–6)	Baxter Arena (3,617); Omaha, NE
February 15, 2026; 12:00 p.m., CBSSN		Denver	W 83–76	14–14 (7–6)	Baxter Arena (3,291); Omaha, NE
February 18, 2026; 7:00 p.m., SLN		Oral Roberts	W 80–71	15–14 (8–6)	Baxter Arena (3,328); Omaha, NE
February 25, 2026; 6:00 p.m., CBSSN		at South Dakota	L 72–89	15–15 (8–7)	Sanford Coyote Sports Center (1,571); Vermillion, SD
February 28, 2026; 7:00 p.m., SLN		at St. Thomas	L 53–68	15–16 (8–8)	Lee and Penny Anderson Arena (2,911); St. Paul, MN
Summit League tournament
March 6, 2026*; 6:00 p.m., SLN	(5)	vs. (4) South Dakota; Quarterfinal	W 76–62	16–16	Denny Sanford Premier Center (6,723); Sioux Falls, SD
March 7, 2026*; 7:15 p.m., CBSSN	(5)	vs. (1) North Dakota State; Semifinal	L 50–74	16–17	Denny Sanford Premier Center; Sioux Falls, SD
*Non-conference game. ^{#}Rankings from AP poll. (#) Tournament seedings in parentheses. All times are in Central.
