= 2025–26 Western Athletic Conference men's basketball season =

2025–26 WAC men's basketball season
- League: NCAA Division I
- Sport: Basketball
- Teams: 7
- TV partner(s): ESPN, ESPN+

Regular season
- Regular season champions: Utah Valley (5th title)
- Season MVP: Dominique Daniels Jr. (Cal Baptist)

WAC tournament
- Champions: California Baptist (1st title)
- Runners-up: Utah Valley
- Tournament MVP: Dominique Daniels Jr.

WAC men's basketball seasons
- ← 2024–25 2026–27 →

2025–26 WAC men's basketball standings
	Conf.				Overall
Team	W		L	PCT	W		L	PCT
Utah Valley	14	–	4	.778	25	–	9	.735
California Baptist †	13	–	5	.722	25	–	9	.735
Utah Tech	11	–	7	.611	19	–	15	.559
UT Arlington	9	–	9	.500	18	–	14	.563
Southern Utah	6	–	12	.333	10	–	22	.313
Abilene Christian	5	–	13	.278	14	–	19	.424
Tarleton	5	–	13	.278	14	–	18	.438
† 2026 WAC tournament winner

The 2025–26 Western Athletic Conference men's basketball season involved play by members of the Western Athletic Conference (WAC), since renamed as the United Athletic Conference (UAC). It began with practices in October followed by the start of the 2025–26 NCAA Division I men's basketball season in early November 2025. Conference play began in January 2026. This was the WAC's 64th season of basketball. The WAC competed with seven teams due to two teams having left the conference since the prior season. Seattle and Grand Canyon both joined other conferences since the prior year. The WAC tournament was held in March 2026 with all seven teams competing for the automatic bid to the 2026 NCAA Division I men's basketball tournament. All rounds were played at the Orleans Arena in the Las Vegas-area community of Paradise, Nevada. California Baptist won the tournament title and received the conference's automatic bid to the 2026 NCAA Division I men's basketball tournament. It was the first appearance in the program's history.

This was the last season under the WAC name. California Baptist and Utah Valley joined the Big West Conference and Southern Utah and Utah Tech joined the Big Sky Conference on July 1, 2026. At that time, the WAC rebranded as the United Athletic Conference (UAC), previously the name of a football-only alliance between the WAC and the Atlantic Sun Conference (ASUN). Three remaining teams—Abilene Christian, Tarleton State, and UT Arlington—were joined by 6 new members of the rebranded UAC.

== Pre-season ==
=== WAC Preseason polling ===
Men's Basketball Coaches Preseason Poll
Place	Team	Points	First place votes
1.	California Baptist	33	5
2.	Utah Valley	29	1
3.	Abilene Christian	27	0
4.	UT Arlington	22	1
5.	Tarleton	19	0
6.	Utah Tech	9	0
7.	Southern Utah	8	0

=== WAC Preseason All-Conference ===
First Team

Name	School	Yr.	Pos.
Dominique Daniels Jr.†	California Baptist	Grad	G
Bradyn Hubbard	Abilene Christian	Senior	F
Raysean Seamster	UT Arlington	Senior	F
Ethan Potter	Utah Tech	Senior	F
Trevan Leonhardt	Utah Valley	Junior	G

† Denotes Preseason Player of the Year

== Regular season ==
=== Early season tournaments ===
Team	Tournament	Finish
Abilene Christian	Jacksonville Classic	1–1
California Baptist	Acrisure Series	3–0
Southern Utah	Urban-Bennett Invitational	1–1
Tarleton State	SMU Multi-Team Event	1–1
UT Arlington	Weber State Tournament	1–1
Utah Tech	Rainbow Classic	1–2
Utah Valley	Cancun Challenge	3–0

=== Records against other conferences ===
2025–26 records against non-conference foes:

Regular season

Power Conferences & Gonzaga	Record
ACC	0–2
Big East	0–1
Big Ten	0–1
Big 12	0–10
Pac-12	0–0
SEC	0–1
Gonzaga	0–1
Power Conference Total	0–16
Other NCAA Division I Conferences	Record
America East	0–0
American	2–0
A-10	0–0
ASUN	1–0
Big Sky	6–2
Big South	1–0
Big West	5–1
CAA	0–2
CUSA	2–0
Horizon	0–0
Ivy League	0–0
MAAC	1–1
MAC	1–0
MEAC	0–0
MVC	1–0
Mountain West	0–4
NEC	0–1
OVC	1–0
Patriot League	0–0
SoCon	1–0
Southland	3–2
SWAC	6–0
Summit	4–1
Sun Belt	0–2
WCC (except Gonzaga)	3–3
Other Division I Total	38–19
Non-Division I Total	18–0
NCAA Division I Total	38–35

=== Record against ranked non-conference opponents ===
This is a list of games against ranked opponents only:

Date	Visitor	Home	Score
November 7, 2025	Utah Tech	#13 Arizona	L, 93–67
November 17, 2025	Southern Utah	#19 Gonzaga	L, 122–50
December 3, 2025	California Baptist	#9 BYU	L, 60–91
December 16, 2025	Abilene Christian	#1 Arizona	L, 62–96
December 19, 2025	Abilene Christian	#10 BYU	L, 67–85

Team rankings are reflective of AP poll when the game was played, not current or final ranking.

=== Rankings ===
	Improvement in ranking
	Drop in ranking
RV	Received votes but were not ranked in Top 25
NV	No votes received

		Pre	Wk 2	Wk 3	Wk 4	Wk 5	Wk 6	Wk 7	Wk 8	Wk 9	Wk 10	Wk 11	Wk 12	Wk 13	Wk 14	Wk 15	Wk 16	Wk 17	Wk 18	Wk 19	Wk 20	Final
Abilene Christian	AP	NV	NV	NV	NV	NV	NV	NV	NV	NV	NV	NV	NV	NV	NV	NV	NV	NV	NV	NV	NV	NV
Abilene Christian	C	NV	NV	NV	NV	NV	NV	NV	NV	NV	NV	NV	NV	NV	NV	NV	NV	NV	NV	NV	NV	NV
California Baptist	AP	NV	NV	NV	NV	NV	NV	NV	NV	NV	NV	NV	NV	NV	NV	NV	NV	NV	NV	NV	NV	NV
California Baptist	C	NV	NV	NV	NV	NV	NV	NV	NV	NV	NV	NV	NV	NV	NV	NV	NV	NV	NV	NV	NV	NV
Southern Utah	AP	NV	NV	NV	NV	NV	NV	NV	NV	NV	NV	NV	NV	NV	NV	NV	NV	NV	NV	NV	NV	NV
Southern Utah	C	NV	NV	NV	NV	NV	NV	NV	NV	NV	NV	NV	NV	NV	NV	NV	NV	NV	NV	NV	NV	NV
Tarleton State	AP	NV	NV	NV	NV	NV	NV	NV	NV	NV	NV	NV	NV	NV	NV	NV	NV	NV	NV	NV	NV	NV
Tarleton State	C	NV	NV	NV	NV	NV	NV	NV	NV	NV	NV	NV	NV	NV	NV	NV	NV	NV	NV	NV	NV	NV
UT Arlington	AP	NV	NV	NV	NV	NV	NV	NV	NV	NV	NV	NV	NV	NV	NV	NV	NV	NV	NV	NV	NV	NV
UT Arlington	C	NV	NV	NV	NV	NV	NV	NV	NV	NV	NV	NV	NV	NV	NV	NV	NV	NV	NV	NV	NV	NV
Utah Tech	AP	NV	NV	NV	NV	NV	NV	NV	NV	NV	NV	NV	NV	NV	NV	NV	NV	NV	NV	NV	NV	NV
Utah Tech	C	NV	NV	NV	NV	NV	NV	NV	NV	NV	NV	NV	NV	NV	NV	NV	NV	NV	NV	NV	NV	NV
Utah Valley	AP	NV	NV	NV	NV	NV	NV	NV	NV	NV	NV	NV	NV	NV	NV	NV	NV	NV	NV	NV	NV	NV
Utah Valley	C	NV	NV	NV	NV	NV	NV	NV	NV	NV	NV	NV	NV	NV	NV	NV	NV	NV	NV	NV	NV	NV

== Head coaches ==
=== Coaching changes ===
No coaching changes were made during the offseason.

=== Coaches ===
Note: Stats shown are before the beginning of the season. Overall and WAC records are from time at current school.

Team	Head coach	Previous job	Seasons at school	Overall record	WAC record	WAC titles	NCAA tournaments	NCAA Final Fours	NCAA Championships
Abilene Christian	Brette Tanner	(Associate HC)	5th	70–62 (.530)	36–36 (.500)	0	0	0	0
California Baptist	Rick Croy	St. Mary's (assistant)	13th	118–99 (.544)	55–61 (.474)	0	0	0	0
Southern Utah	Rob Jeter	Western Illinois	3rd	22–40 (.355)	9–27 (.250)	0	0	0	0
Tarleton State	Billy Gillispie	Ranger College	6th	78–74 (.513)	46–38 (.548)	0	0	0	0
UT Arlington	K. T. Turner	Kentucky (assistant)	3rd	33–32 (.508)	19–17 (.528)	0	0	0	0
Utah Tech	Jon Judkins	Snow College	21st	53–96 (.356)	24–62 (.279)	0	0	0	0
Utah Valley	Todd Phillips	(Associate HC)	3rd	41–25 (.621)	26–10 (.722)	1	0	0	0

Notes:

- Overall and WAC records, conference titles, etc. are from time at current school and are through the end of the 2024–25 season.
- Records and season totals only include time spent at Division I as head coach.
- NCAA tournament appearances are from time at current school only.
- NCAA Final Fours and Championship include time at other schools.

== Postseason ==
=== WAC tournament ===
The WAC tournament was held in March 2026 with all seven teams competing for the automatic bid to the 2026 NCAA Division I men's basketball tournament. All rounds were held at the Orleans Arena in the Las Vegas-area community of Paradise, Nevada.

=== NCAA tournament ===
Teams from the conference that were selected to participate: 1

Seed	Region	School	First Four	First round	Second round	Sweet Sixteen	Elite Eight	Final Four	Championship
13	East	California Baptist	N/A	L 60–68 vs. (4) Kansas	DNP				
	Bids	W-L (%):	0–0 (–)	0–1 (.000)	0–0 (–)	0–0 (–)	0–0 (–)	0–0 (–)	TOTAL: 0–1 (.000)

=== National Invitation Tournament ===
Number from the conference that were selected to participate: 1

Seed	School	First round	Second round	Quarterfinals	Semifinals	Finals
4	Utah Valley	L 78–79 vs. (4) George Washington	DNP			
	W-L (%):	0–1 (.000)	0–0 (–)	0–0 (–)	0–0 (–)	TOTAL: 0–1 (.000)

Index to colors and formatting
WAC member won
WAC member lost

*Denotes overtime period

== Awards and honors ==
=== Players of the week ===
Throughout the conference regular season, the WAC offices name a player of the week and a newcomer of the week each Monday.

Week	Player of the Week	School	Newcomer of the Week	School
November 10	Dominique Daniels Jr.	California Baptist	Chance Trujillo	Utah Tech
November 17	Dior Johnson	Tarleton State	Dior Johnson	Tarleton State
November 24	Dior Johnson	Tarleton State	Dior Johnson	Tarleton State
December 1	Ethan Potter	Utah Tech	Jordan Muller	California Baptist
December 8	Jackson Holcombe	Utah Valley	Cam McDowell	Tarleton State
December 15	Dominique Daniels Jr.	California Baptist	Noah Bolanga	Utah Tech
December 22	Ethan Potter	Utah Tech	Cbo Newton	Abilene Christian
December 29	Bradyn Hubbard	Abilene Christian	Marcell McCreary	UT Arlington
January 5	Dior Johnson	Tarleton State	Dior Johnson	Tarleton State
January 12	Bradyn Hubbard	Abilene Christian	Dior Johnson	Tarleton State
January 20	Ethan Potter	Utah Tech	Dior Johnson	Tarleton State
January 26	Dominique Daniels Jr.	California Baptist	Jaiden Feroah	Southern Utah
February 2	Dominique Daniels Jr.	California Baptist	Elijah Duval	Southern Utah
February 9	Chance Trujillo	Utah Tech	Chance Trujillo	Utah Tech
February 16	Dominique Daniels Jr.	California Baptist	Elijah Duval	Southern Utah
February 23	Ethan Potter	Utah Tech	Elijah Duval	Southern Utah
March 2	Dominique Daniels Jr.	California Baptist	Tanner Hayhurst	Southern Utah
March 9	Dominique Daniels Jr.	California Baptist	Elijah Duval	Southern Utah

==== Totals per school - Players of the week ====
School	Player of the week	Newcomer of the week	Total
Abilene Christian University	2	1	3
California Baptist University	7	1	8
Southern Utah University		6	6
Tarleton State University	3	6	9
University of Texas at Arlington		1	1
Utah Tech University	5	3	8
Utah Valley University	1		1
Total	18	18	36

=== All-WAC ===
First team

Name	School
Bradyn Hubbard	Abilene Christian
Dominique Daniels, Jr.‡	California Baptist
Ethan Potter	Utah Tech
Jackson Holcombe	Utah Valley
Trevan Leonhardt	Utah Valley

- ‡ WAC Player of the Year

Second team

Name	School
Martell Williams	California Baptist
Elijah Duval	Southern Utah
Dior Johnson	Tarleton State
Marcell McCreary	UT Arlington
Noah Bolanga	Utah Tech

==== All-Freshman team ====
Name	School
Jordan Muller	California Baptist
Elijah Duval†	Southern Utah
Andy Sigiscar	Tarleton State
Jordan Lowery	UT Arlington
Tanner Davis	Utah Tech

† Freshman of the Year

==== All-Defensive team ====
Name	School
Rich Smith‡	Abilene Christian
Jaiden Feroah	Southern Utah
Jordan Mizell	Tarleton State
Jackson Holcombe	Utah Valley
Trevan Leonhardt	Utah Valley

- ‡WAC Defensive Player of the Year

==== Other awards ====
Sixth Man of the Year: Dior Johnson, Tarleton State

Coach of the Year: Jon Judkins, Utah Tech

== Home game attendance ==
Team	Arena	Capacity	Game 1	Game 2	Game 3	Game 4	Game 5	Game 6	Game 7	Game 8	Game 9	Game 10	Game 11	Game 12	Game 13	Game 14	Game 15	Game 16	Total	Average	% of Capacity
Abilene Christian	Moody Coliseum	3,600	1,523	1,025	654	584	923	718	958	1,229	1,261	1,329	†1,818	1,196	1,174	1,080			15,472	1,105	31%
California Baptist	CBU Events Center	5,050	4,386	**†5,088**	3,766	2,617	2,425	3,601	2,012	3,438	2,264	3,907	3,052	3.079	2,871	4,294	4,681		51,481	3,432	68%
Southern Utah	America First Event Center	5,300	1,489	801	709	565	796	955	805	1,151	853	771	†2,231	1,540	602				11,126	1,011	19%
Tarleton State	EECU Center	8,000	1,661	1,353	1,123	1,358	1,213	1,351	811	987	1,019	1,567	2,267	2,119	2,183	†3,187	1,502	760	24,461	1,529	19%
UT Arlington	College Park Center	7,000	1,153	763	†2,934	1,275	1,482	841	1,373	1,457	1,140	1,140	1,152	1,466	1,555				17,731	1,364	19%
Utah Tech	Burns Arena	4,779	1,575	1,237	1,246	1,107	1,237	2,524	1,793	1,540	†3,833	2,008	2,786	1,943	2,274	3,116			28,219	2,016	42%
Utah Valley	UCCU Center	8,500	1,409	2,114	1,374	1,423	1,457	1,426	2,171	1,872	†2,551	2,517	1,581	2,245	2,364	2,355	2,094		28,953	1,930	23%
Total		42,229																	179,585	12,396	32%

Bold – At or exceed capacity; attendance is for regular season only

- †Season high

== See also ==
- 2025–26 Western Athletic Conference women's basketball season
- United Athletic Conference Men's Basketball Player of the Year
