= List of California Baptist Lancers men's basketball head coaches =

The following is a list of California Baptist Lancers men's basketball head coaches. There have been 12 head coaches of the Lancers in their 67-season history.

California Baptist's current head coach is Rick Croy. He was hired as the Lancers' head coach in April 2013, replacing Tim Collins, who retired after 2012–13 season.

No.	Tenure	Coach	Years	Record	Pct.
1	1956–1958	Earl Marshall	2	24–17	.585
2	1958–1966	Dewey Jones	8	101–109	.481
3	1966–1969	Lloyd Aycock	3	32–48	.400
4	1969–1970	Ed Hurt	1	9–14	.391
5	1970–1979	Floyd Evans	9	168–112	.600
6	1979–1980	Jim Christopher	1	8–22	.267
7	1980–1994	Jerry King	14	200–237	.458
8	1994–1995	Mike Vanta	1	13–17	.433
9	1995–1999	Lee Erickson	4	52–72	.419
10	1999–2002	Scott Mossman	3	58–39	.598
11	2002–2013	Tim Collins	11	195–131	.598
12	2013–present	Rick Croy	10	217–96	.693
Totals		12 coaches	67 seasons	1,077–914	.541
Records updated through end of 2022–23 season Source
