= 2025–26 Utah Tech Trailblazers men's basketball team =

American college basketball season

2025–26 Utah Tech Trailblazers men's basketball
- Conference: Western Athletic Conference
- Record: 19–15 (11–7 WAC)
- Head coach: Jon Judkins (21st season)
- Associate head coach: Jake Schroeder
- Assistant coaches: Anthony Morris; Elliott De Wit; Brock Staheli
- Home arena: Burns Arena

2025–26 WAC men's basketball standings
| | Conf. | | | | Overall |
| Team | W | | L | PCT | W | | L | PCT |
|---|---|---|---|---|---|---|---|---|
| Utah Valley | 14 | – | 4 | .778 | 25 | – | 9 | .735 |
| California Baptist † | 13 | – | 5 | .722 | 25 | – | 9 | .735 |
| Utah Tech | 11 | – | 7 | .611 | 19 | – | 15 | .559 |
| UT Arlington | 9 | – | 9 | .500 | 18 | – | 14 | .563 |
| Southern Utah | 6 | – | 12 | .333 | 10 | – | 22 | .313 |
| Abilene Christian | 5 | – | 13 | .278 | 14 | – | 19 | .424 |
| Tarleton | 5 | – | 13 | .278 | 14 | – | 18 | .438 |
† 2026 WAC tournament winner

The 2025–26 Utah Tech Trailblazers men's basketball team represented Utah Tech University during the 2025–26 NCAA Division I men's basketball season. The Trailblazers, led by 21st-year head coach Jon Judkins, played their home games at Burns Arena in St. George, Utah as members of the Western Athletic Conference (WAC). This was Utah Tech's final season as members of the WAC, as they joined the Big Sky Conference, effective July 1, 2026.

The Trailblazers surpassed expectations and finished the regular season with an 18–14 overall record and a conference record of 11–7, good for third in the WAC. Utah Tech defeated Abilene Christian in the quarterfinals of the WAC tournament before falling to 2–seed California Baptist in the semifinal round.

== Previous season ==
The Trailblazers finished the 2024–25 season 7–26, 2–14 in WAC play, to finish in ninth (last) place. They defeated Southern Utah, before falling to top-seeded Utah Valley in the quarterfinals of the WAC tournament.

== Preseason ==
On October 28, 2025, the WAC released their preseason coaches poll. Utah Tech was picked to finish sixth in the conference.

=== Preseason rankings ===
WAC Preseason Poll
| Place | Team | Points |
|---|---|---|
| 1 | California Baptist | 33 (5) |
| 2 | Utah Valley | 29 (1) |
| 3 | Abilene Christian | 27 |
| 4 | UT Arlington | 22 (1) |
| 5 | Tarleton State | 19 |
| 6 | Utah Tech | 9 |
| 7 | Southern Utah | 8 |
(#) first-place votes

=== Preseason All-WAC Team ===
Preseason All-WAC Team
| Player | Year | Position |
|---|---|---|
| Ethan Potter | Senior | Forward |

== Roster ==
2025–26 Utah Tech Trailblazers men's basketball team
Players
Coaches

| Pos. | # | Name | Height | Weight | Year | Previous school | Hometown |
|---|---|---|---|---|---|---|---|
| G | 1 | Hunter Schenck | 6 ft 2 in (1.88 m) | 165 lb (75 kg) | So | Weber High School | Pleasant View, Utah |
| G | 2 | Chance Trujillo | 6 ft 4 in (1.93 m) | 200 lb (91 kg) | RS So | Snow College | Kaysville, Utah |
| G | 3 | Boston Harker | 6 ft 4 in (1.93 m) | 205 lb (93 kg) | RS Jr | Garden City Community College | Raymond, Alberta |
| G | 4 | Jusaun Holt | 6 ft 7 in (2.01 m) | 185 lb (84 kg) | RS Sr | Kennesaw State | Tacoma, Washington |
| F | 5 | Dallin Grant | 6 ft 8 in (2.03 m) | 220 lb (100 kg) | RS So | Utah State | Cedar City, Utah |
| G | 8 | Marvel Allen | 6 ft 4 in (1.93 m) | 205 lb (93 kg) | RS So | Dayton | Fort Lauderdale, Florida |
| G | 11 | Tanner Davis | 6 ft 5 in (1.96 m) | 160 lb (73 kg) | Fr | Sky View High School | Smithfield, Utah |
| G | 13 | Britton Berrett | 6 ft 5 in (1.96 m) | 185 lb (84 kg) | Sr | College of Southern Idaho | Rigby, Idaho |
| G/F | 14 | Preston Vandermyde | 6 ft 5 in (1.96 m) | 190 lb (86 kg) | So | Desert Hills High School | St. George, Utah |
| F | 23 | Samuel "Tobi" Ariyibi | 6 ft 8 in (2.03 m) | 190 lb (86 kg) | RS Sr | Washington | Lagos, Nigeria |
| G | 33 | Madiba Owona | 6 ft 4 in (1.93 m) | 175 lb (79 kg) | So | EB Orthez | Bordeaux, France |
| F | 35 | Ethan Potter | 6 ft 8 in (2.03 m) | 230 lb (104 kg) | Sr | Utah Valley | Layton, Utah |
| F | 52 | Dario Domingos (6th) | 6 ft 7 in (2.01 m) | 260 lb (118 kg) | Sr | UT Permian Basin | Luanda, Angola |
| G | 66 | Noah Bolanga | 6 ft 8 in (2.03 m) | 180 lb (82 kg) | So | St. Bonaventure | Poitiers, France |

Head coach

- Jon Judkins (Utah State)

Assistant coach(es)

- Jake Schroeder (Portland State)
- Anthony Morris (Washington)
- Elliott De Wit (Texas Tech)
- Brock Staheli (Utah Tech)

Legend

- (C) Team captain
- (S) Suspended
- (I) Ineligible
- (W) Walk-on
- (6th) Sixth-year senior
- Injured
- Current redshirt

Roster
Last update: November 2, 2025

== Schedule and results ==
| Date time, TV | Rank^{#} | Opponent^{#} | Result | Record | High points | High rebounds | High assists | Site (attendance) city, state |
Exhibition
| October 18, 2025*; 4:00 pm | | West Coast Baptist | W 105–55 | – | 23 – Potter | – | – | Burns Arena; St. George, UT |
Non-conference regular season
| November 3, 2025*; 6:30 pm, SLN | | at South Dakota | W 81–79 ^{OT} | 1–0 | 17 – Tied | 12 – Trujillo | 5 – Trujillo | Sanford Coyote Sports Center (1,640); Vermillion, SD |
| November 5, 2025*; 7:00 pm, ESPN+ | | Bethesda | W 110–65 | 2–0 | 23 – Potter | 9 – Trujillo | 3 – Tied | Burns Arena (1,575); St. George, UT |
| November 7, 2025*; 7:00 pm, TNT/TruTv | | at No. 13 Arizona | L 67–93 | 2–1 | 15 – Potter | 6 – Tied | 2 – Trujillo | McKale Center (14,082); Tucson, AZ |
| November 9, 2025*; 1:00 pm, ESPN+ | | at Arizona State | L 66-81 | 2−2 | 15 – Trujillo | 8 – Potter | 4 – Holt | Desert Financial Arena (5,862); Tempe, AZ |
| November 12, 2025*; 8:30 pm | | vs. Manhattan; OUTRIGGER Rainbow Classic | L 75-79 | 2−3 | 20 – Potter | 11 – Potter | 3 – Tied | Stan Sheriff Center; Honolulu, HI |
| November 14, 2025*; 8:30 pm | | vs. Mississippi Valley State; OUTRIGGER Rainbow Classic | W 81-75 ^{2OT} | 3−3 | 22 – Potter | 13 – Potter | 7 – Davis | Stan Sheriff Center; Honolulu, HI |
| November 15, 2025*; 11:00 pm, ESPN+ | | at Hawai'i; OUTRIGGER Rainbow Classic | L 62–68 | 3–4 | 15 – Potter | 5 – Tied | 2 – Holt | Stan Sheriff Center (5,211); Honolulu, HI |
| November 21, 2025*; 7:00 pm, ESPN+ | | Nobel | W 96-48 | 4−4 | 17 – Holt | 7 – Potter | 4 – Tied | Burns Arena (1,237); St. George, UT |
| November 25, 2025*; 7:00 pm, ESPN+ | | Portland State | L 63-68 | 4−5 | 18 – Potter | 7 – Trujillo | 5 – Trujillo | Burns Arena (1,246); St. George, UT |
| November 29, 2025*; 3:00 pm, ESPN+ | | UC Riverside | W 77-69 | 5−5 | 26 – Potter | 8 – Bolanga | 4 – Bolanga | Burns Arena (1,107); St. George, UT |
| December 3, 2025*; 8:00 pm, ESPN+ | | at Santa Clara | L 80–90 | 5–6 | 25 – Owona | 9 – Potter | 6 – Bolanga | Leavey Center (1,969); Santa Clara, CA |
| December 13, 2025*; 7:00 pm, ESPN+ | | Justice | W 89–48 | 6–6 | 19 – Bolanga | 8 – Bolanga | 6 – Holt | Burns Arena (1,237); St. George, UT |
| December 20, 2025*; 7:00 pm, ESPN+ | | at Weber State | W 82–80 | 7–6 | 23 – Potter | 8 – Potter | 2 – Tied | Dee Events Center (2,793); Ogden, UT |
| December 22, 2025*; 6:00 pm, ESPN+ | | at Creighton | L 69–92 | 7–7 | 18 – Potter | 8 – Potter | 5 – Bolanga | CHI Health Center Omaha (16,267); Omaha, NE |
WAC regular season
| December 29, 2025; 7:00 pm, ESPN+ | | Southern Utah | W 80–66 | 8–7 (1–0) | 18 – Bolanga | 9 – Potter | 4 – Holt | Burns Arena (2,524); St. George, UT |
| January 1, 2026; 6:00 pm, ESPN+ | | at Abilene Christian | W 79–64 | 9–7 (2–0) | 19 – Trujillo | 10 – Bolanga | 5 – Davis | Moody Coliseum (718); Abilene, TX |
| January 8, 2026; 8:00 pm, ESPN+ | | at California Baptist | L 72–84 | 9–8 (2–1) | 20 – Potter | 9 – Potter | 4 – Trujillo | Fowler Events Center (2,012); Riverside, CA |
| January 10, 2026; 2:00 pm, ESPN+ | | at Utah Valley; Old Hammer Rivalry | L 76–92 | 9–9 (2–2) | 15 – Holt | 7 – Tied | 5 – Trujillo | UCCU Center (2,551); Orem, UT |
| January 15, 2026; 7:00 pm, ESPN+ | | UT Arlington | L 52–56 | 9–10 (2–3) | 16 – Davis | 11 – Potter | 2 – Trujillo | Burns Arena (1,793); St. George, UT |
| January 17, 2026; 7:00 pm, ESPN+ | | Tarleton State | W 75–71 | 10–10 (3–3) | 23 – Potter | 10 – Davis | 6 – Holt | Burns Arena (1,540); St. George, UT |
| January 21, 2026; 8:00 pm, ESPN+ | | at California Baptist | L 64–73 | 10–11 (3–4) | 21 – Holt | 11 – Potter | 4 – Trujillo | Fowler Events Center (2,264); Riverside, CA |
| January 24, 2026; 7:00 pm, ESPN+ | | Southern Utah | W 102–91 | 11–11 (4–4) | 29 – Potter | 11 – Potter | 12 – Holt | Burns Arena (3,833); St. George, UT |
| January 29, 2026; 6:00 pm, ESPN+ | | at Abilene Christian | W 76–70 | 12–11 (5–4) | 16 – Potter | 8 – Potter | 4 – Trujillo | Moody Coliseum (1,261); Abilene, TX |
| January 31, 2026; 3:00 pm, ESPN+ | | at Tarleton State | W 65–59 | 13–11 (6–4) | 23 – Bolanga | 7 – Holt | 3 – Trujillo | EECU Center (2,119); Stephenville, TX |
| February 5, 2026; 7:00 pm, ESPN+ | | UT Arlington | W 87–84 | 14–11 (7–4) | 22 – Trujillo | 8 – Bolanga | 4 – Holt | Burns Arena (2,008); St. George, UT |
| February 12, 2026; 7:00 pm, ESPN+ | | Utah Valley; Old Hammer Rivalry | W 81–77 | 15–11 (8–4) | 14 – Trujillo | 9 – Potter | 3 – Tied | Burns Arena (2,786); St. George, UT |
| February 14, 2026; 7:00 pm, ESPN+ | | California Baptist | W 70–65 | 16–11 (9–4) | 18 – Bolanga | 11 – Potter | 4 – Tied | Burns Arena (1,943); St. George, UT |
| February 19, 2026; 6:00 pm, ESPN+ | | at UT Arlington | L 50–63 | 16–12 (9–5) | 16 – Potter | 11 – Potter | 4 – Trujillo | College Park Center (1,466); Arlington, TX |
| February 21, 2026; 3:00 pm, ESPN+ | | at Tarleton State | W 80–72 | 17–12 (10–5) | 19 – Tied | 10 – Trujillo | 5 – Holt | EECU Center (1,502); Stephenville, TX |
| February 26, 2026; 7:00 pm, ESPN+ | | Abilene Christian | W 85–81 | 18–12 (11–5) | 25 – Potter | 8 – Tied | 6 – Holt | Burns Arena (2,274); St. George, UT |
| February 28, 2026; 6:30 pm, ESPN+ | | at Southern Utah | L 67–81 | 18–13 (11–6) | 28 – Holt | 8 – Potter | 3 – Potter | America First Event Center (2,231); Cedar City, UT |
| March 7, 2026; 7:00 pm, ESPN+ | | Utah Valley; Old Hammer Rivalry | L 101–104 ^{2OT} | 18–14 (11–7) | 28 – Potter | 10 – Potter | 5 – Potter | Burns Arena (3,116); St. George, UT |
WAC tournament
| March 12, 2026; 7:30 pm, ESPN+ | (3) | vs. (6) Abilene Christian; Quarterfinals | W 80–74 | 19–14 | 25 – Potter | 7 – Potter | 6 – Bolanga | Orleans Arena (1,029); Paradise, NV |
| March 13, 2026; 7:30 pm, ESPN+ | (3) | vs. (2) California Baptist; Semifinals | L 72–86 | 19–15 | 25 – Potter | 8 – Bolanga | 5 – Holt | Orleans Arena (1,474); Paradise, NV |
*Non-conference game. ^{#}Rankings from AP Poll. (#) Tournament seedings in parentheses. All times are in Mountain.
