= 2026 WAC men's basketball tournament =

Postseason men's basketball tournament

- Classification: Division I
- Season: 2025–26
- Teams: 7
- Site: Orleans Arena; Paradise, Nevada
- Champions: California Baptist (1st title)
- Winning coach: Rick Croy (1st title)
- Television: ESPN+, ESPN2

2025–26 WAC men's basketball standings
	Conf.				Overall
Team	W		L	PCT	W		L	PCT
Utah Valley	14	–	4	.778	25	–	9	.735
California Baptist †	13	–	5	.722	25	–	9	.735
Utah Tech	11	–	7	.611	19	–	15	.559
UT Arlington	9	–	9	.500	18	–	14	.563
Southern Utah	6	–	12	.333	10	–	22	.313
Abilene Christian	5	–	13	.278	14	–	19	.424
Tarleton	5	–	13	.278	14	–	18	.438
† 2026 WAC tournament winner

The 2026 WAC men's basketball tournament was the postseason men's basketball tournament of the Western Athletic Conference (WAC) for the 2025–26 NCAA Division I men's basketball season. The tournament was played from March 11–14, 2026 with all rounds at the Orleans Arena in Paradise, Nevada near Las Vegas. This was the 16th year that the tournament was held at the Orleans Arena. The winner, California Baptist, received the conference's automatic bid to the NCAA tournament.

This was also the last men's tournament under the Western Athletic Conference name. On July 1, 2026, the WAC rebranded as the United Athletic Conference, assuming the name previously used for a football-only alliance between the WAC and Atlantic Sun Conference. Three legacy WAC members (Abilene Christian, Tarleton State, and UT Arlington) maintained their conference memberships through the transition. It was also the last WAC/UAC tournament held in the Las Vegas Valley; with the westernmost UAC members now in Texas, the tournament moved to the Dallas–Fort Worth city of Allen, Texas at the Credit Union of Texas Event Center.

Utah Valley initially was denied to play in the tournament due to their issues regarding an unpaid exit fee before the Fourth District Court in Utah granted the university's motion for a preliminary injunction that allowed them to play. On March 10, the WAC placed Utah Valley in an ultimatum, claiming that the University had to put the $1 million exit fee in an escrow account for the duration of the court proceedings by the end of the day or the brackets would be modified, claiming the court order forced them to do so while Utah Valley contended they were coordinating with the court over the process. Utah Valley placed the fee in the escrow account, which will either go to the WAC or be returned to Utah Valley depending on the outcome of the court case, allowing them to participate in the tournament. With a victory by Utah Valley and California Baptist in the Semifinals, the tournament was guaranteed to have a first-time winner.

== Seeds ==
All seven members were invited to the tournament. For the 2025 WAC tournament, seeding was determined by conference record with ties broken first by head-to-head competition, then by the WAC Résumé Seeding System points. The highest two seeded teams will receive byes to the semifinals in this year's tournament. Only Abilene Christian, UT Arlington, and Southern Utah have participated in the NCAA tournament in the past, the other four teams having never been invited.

Seed	School	Conference record	Tiebreak
1	Utah Valley	14–4	
2	California Baptist	13–5	
3	Utah Tech	11–7	
4	UT Arlington	9–9	
5	Southern Utah	6–12	
6	Abilene Christian	5–13	2–1 vs. Tarleton
7	Tarleton	5–13	1–2 vs. Abilene Christian

== Schedule ==
Session	Game	Time*	Matchup^{#}	Score	Television	Attendance
First round – Wednesday, March 11
1	1	5:30 p.m.	No. 6 Abilene Christian vs. No. 7 Tarleton	84–78	ESPN+	760
Quarterfinals – Thursday, March 12
2	2	6:00 p.m.	No. 4 UT Arlington vs. No. 5 Southern Utah	69–63	ESPN+	1,029
2	3	8:30 p.m.	No. 3 Utah Tech vs. No. 6 Abilene Christian	80–74	ESPN+	1,029
Semifinals – Friday, March 13
3	4	6:00 p.m.	No. 1 Utah Valley vs. No. 4 UT Arlington	67–65	ESPN+	1,474
3	5	8:30 p.m.	No. 2 California Baptist vs. No. 3 Utah Tech	86–72	ESPN+	1,474
Championship – Saturday, March 14
4	6	9:00 p.m.	No. 1 Utah Valley vs. No. 2 California Baptist	61–63	ESPN2	1,151
* Game times in PDT for all rounds.^{#}Rankings denote tournament seeding.

== Bracket ==
First Round; Wednesday, March 11; ESPN+
6	Abilene Christian	84
7	Tarleton	78

Quarterfinals; Thursday March 12; ESPN+
4	UT Arlington	69
5	Southern Utah	63
3	Utah Tech	80
6	Abilene Christian	74

Semifinals; Friday, March 13; ESPN+
1	Utah Valley	67
4	UT Arlington	65
2	California Baptist	86
3	Utah Tech	72

Championship; Saturday, March 14; ESPN2
1	Utah Valley	61
2	California Baptist	63

== Awards ==
Award	Player	Team
Most Outstanding Player	Dominique Daniels Jr.	Cal Baptist
All-Tournament Team	Jayden Jackson	Cal Baptist
	Trevan Leonhardt	Utah Valley
	Jackson Holcombe	Utah Valley
	Ethan Potter	Utah Tech

== See also ==
- 2026 WAC women's basketball tournament
- United Athletic Conference Men's Basketball Player of the Year
