= 2025–26 Utah Valley Wolverines men's basketball team =

Intercollegiate basketball season

2025–26 Utah Valley Wolverines men's basketball

WAC regular season champions

NIT, First round
- Conference: Western Athletic Conference
- Record: 25–9 (14–4 WAC)
- Head coach: Todd Phillips (3rd season)
- Associate head coach: Todd Okeson (7th season)
- Assistant coaches: Adam Jacobsen (2nd season); Ivory "Trey" Young (1st season) Trevor Stranger (1st season)
- Home arena: UCCU Center (Capacity: 8,500)

2025–26 WAC men's basketball standings
	Conf.				Overall
Team	W		L	PCT	W		L	PCT
Utah Valley	14	–	4	.778	25	–	9	.735
California Baptist †	13	–	5	.722	25	–	8	.758
Utah Tech	11	–	7	.611	19	–	15	.559
UT Arlington	9	–	9	.500	18	–	14	.563
Southern Utah	6	–	12	.333	10	–	22	.313
Abilene Christian	5	–	13	.278	14	–	19	.424
Tarleton	5	–	13	.278	14	–	18	.438
† 2026 WAC tournament winner As of March 18, 2026

The 2025–26 Utah Valley Wolverines men's basketball team represented Utah Valley University in the 2025–26 NCAA Division I men's basketball season. The Wolverines, led by third-year head coach Todd Phillips, played their home games at the UCCU Center in Orem, Utah and compete as members of the Western Athletic Conference (WAC).

This was the Wolverines' last season in the WAC. In March 2025, the Big West Conference reportedly invited Utah Valley to join their conference beginning in 2026. UVU's Big West move was officially announced on June 4.

In February 2026, due to disputes with the WAC over unpaid exit fees, the Wolverines were declared to be not in good standing with the conference, and thus were initially prohibited from participating in the conference championship (including the 2026 WAC men's basketball tournament), or having their games be broadcast. The Fourth District Court in Utah later granted the university's motion for a preliminary injunction that allowed them to play in the conference tournament. The WAC then reasserted that Utah Valley would not play in the conference tournament if they did not pay the exit fee by March 10th at 5:00 p.m. MST, a day prior to the tournament's start. It was confirmed later that day that Utah Valley would play in the conference tournament, as the WAC was assured by the Fourth District Court in Utah that the payment from Utah Valley was in process.

== Previous season ==
The Wolverines finished the 2024–25 season 25–9, 15–1 in WAC play, to finish in first place. As the No. 1 seed in the WAC tournament, they defeated Utah Tech in the quarterfinals and Seattle in the semifinals before falling to Grand Canyon in the championship game 89–82. As the WAC regular season champions, Utah Valley was invited to participate in the 2025 National Invitation Tournament. The Wolverines were defeated in the first round by San Francisco 70–79.

== Offseason ==
=== Departures ===
Name	Position	Height	Year	Reason for departure
Kylin Green	G	6' 0"	Junior	Transferred to Houston Christian
Osiris Grady	F	6' 8"	Junior	Transferred to UC Riverside
Andre Johnson Jr.	G	6' 4"	Junior	Transferred to Ouachita Baptist
Tyler Medaris	F	6' 7"	Sophomore	Entered transfer portal April 10; decided to return
Dylan Metoyer	G	6' 1"	Freshman	Transferred to Pierce College
Jake Nadauld	G	6' 2"	Freshman	Transferred to Westminster
Dominick Nelson	G	6' 5"	Junior	Transferred to Iowa State
Ethan Potter	F	6' 8"	Junior	Transferred to Utah Tech
Majer Sullivan	C	6' 8"	Senior	Transferred to Weber State football
Noah Taitz	G	6' 4"	Junior	Entered transfer portal March 28; decided to return
Tanner Toolson	G	6' 5"	Sophomore	Transferred to TCU
Carter Welling	F	6' 10"	Sophomore	Transferred to Clemson
Cory Wells	F	6' 7"	Senior	Transferred to Prairie View A&M

=== Incoming transfers ===
Name	Position	Height	Year	Previous school
Isaac Davis	F	6' 6"	Sophomore	Utah State
AJ Dixon	G/F	6' 5"	Junior	Western Illinois
Isaac Hawkins	F	6' 10"	Junior	College of Southern Idaho
Tyler Hendricks	G	6' 6"	Junior	Central Florida
Braden Housley	G	6' 4"	Redshirt Junior	Utah State
Joul Karram	C	6' 10"	Sophomore	Utah
AJ Riggs	G	6' 3"	Sophomore	Fort Lewis
Sherman Weatherspoon IV	G	6' 3"	Sophomore	Frank Phillips

== Roster ==
2025–26 Utah Valley Wolverines men's basketball team
Players
Coaches

Pos.	#	Name	Height	Weight	Year	Previous school	Hometown
F	1	Isaac Davis	6 ft 8 in (2.03 m)	240 lb (109 kg)	So	Hillcrest HS; Utah State	Idaho Falls, ID
G	2	Jackson Holcombe	6 ft 6 in (1.98 m)	200 lb (91 kg)	RS So	Timpanogos HS	Orem, UT
G	3	Jaxson Roberts (redshirt)	6 ft 2 in (1.88 m)	165 lb (75 kg)	Fr	Corner Canyon HS	Draper, UT
G	4	Sherman Weatherspoon IV	6 ft 3 in (1.91 m)	180 lb (82 kg)	So	Bethesda-Chevy Chase HS; Valparaiso; Frank Phillips	Bowie, MD
G	5	AJ Riggs (W)	6 ft 3 in (1.91 m)	180 lb (82 kg)	So	Highland HS; Fort Lewis College	Gilbert, AZ
G	7	Noah Taitz	6 ft 4 in (1.93 m)	190 lb (86 kg)	RS Sr	Bishop Gorman HS; Loyola Marymount	Las Vegas, NV
F	8	Hayden Welling	6 ft 9 in (2.06 m)	210 lb (95 kg)	Sr	Corner Canyon HS; UC Irvine	Draper, UT
G	9	Braden Housley	6 ft 4 in (1.93 m)	180 lb (82 kg)	RS Jr	Skyridge HS; Utah State	Lehi, UT
G	10	Trevan Leonhardt	6 ft 4 in (1.93 m)	175 lb (79 kg)	RS Jr	Davis HS	Kaysville, UT
F	11	Tyler Weaver	6 ft 7 in (2.01 m)	175 lb (79 kg)	RS Fr	Aliso Niguel HS	Aliso Viejo, CA
F	12	Tyler Medaris (W)	6 ft 7 in (2.01 m)	205 lb (93 kg)	RS Fr	Middleton, HS	Middleton, ID
G	15	Tyler Hendricks	6 ft 6 in (1.98 m)	190 lb (86 kg)	RS Jr	Calvary Christian Academy; Central Florida	Fort Lauderdale, FL
F	23	Isaac Hawkins	6 ft 10 in (2.08 m)	195 lb (88 kg)	Jr	Legion Collegiate Academy; College of Southern Idaho	Fort Mill, SC
G/F	24	AJ Dixon (injured)	6 ft 5 in (1.96 m)	205 lb (93 kg)	RS Jr	Merrillville HS; Triton College; Western Illinois	Merrillville, IN
C	99	Joul Karram	6 ft 10 in (2.08 m)	225 lb (102 kg)	So	Hakfar Hayarok; Utah	Nazareth, Israel

Head coach

- Todd Phillips (Lewis–Clark State)

Assistant coach(es)

- Todd Okeson (Nevada)
- Adam Jacobsen (Pacific)
- Ivory "Trey" Young (Utah Valley)
- Trevor Stranger (Boise State)

Strength and conditioning coach(es)

- Kaleb John-Lewis

Athletic trainer(s)

- Troyce Solley

Legend

- (C) Team captain
- (S) Suspended
- (I) Ineligible
- (W) Walk-on
- Injured
- Current redshirt

Roster
Last update: July 22, 2025

== Schedule and results ==
Date time, TV	Rank^{#}	Opponent^{#}	Result	Record	High points	High rebounds	High assists	Site (attendance) city, state
Non-conference regular season
November 4, 2025*; 6:00 pm, ESPN+		West Coast Baptist	W 116–35	1–0	19 – Holcombe	14 – Hawkins	9 – Leonhardt	UCCU Center (1,409); Orem, UT
November 8, 2025*; 2:00 pm, MW Network		at Boise State	L 77–101	1–1	22 – Holcombe	5 – Leonhardt	4 – Leonhardt	ExtraMile Arena (10,240); Boise, ID
November 12, 2025*; 6:00 pm, ESPN+		Westminster	W 91–60	2–1	22 – Hendricks	10 – Holcombe	13 – Leonhardt	UCCU Center (2,114); Orem, UT
November 15, 2025*; 7:00 pm, MW Network		at Fresno State	L 74–75	2–2	17 – Welling	6 – Davis	7 – Leonhardt	Save Mart Center (2,969); Fresno, CA
November 19, 2025*; 6:00 pm, ESPN+		UC Irvine; Cancun Challenge campus game	W 79–72	3–2	18 – Davis	12 – Holcombe	5 – Tied	UCCU Center (1,374); Orem, UT
November 25, 2025*; 4:00 pm, FloCollege		vs. South Dakota State; Cancun Challenge	W 75–52	4–2	16 – Tied	7 – Housley	5 – Holcombe	Hard Rock Hotel Riviera Maya (300); Cancún, Mexico
November 26, 2025*; 4:00 pm, FloCollege		vs. Samford; Cancun Challenge	W 89–45	5–2	21 – Holcombe	6 – Hendricks	5 – Housley	Hard Rock Hotel Riviera Maya; Cancún, Mexico
December 3, 2025*; 8:00 pm, MW Network		at San Diego State	L 66–77	5–3	17 – Holcombe	10 – Holcombe	5 – Tied	Viejas Arena (11,683); San Diego, CA
December 6, 2025*; 11:00 am, ESPN+		at Bowling Green	W 82–71	6–3	19 – Holcombe	11 – Hendricks	9 – Leonhardt	Stroh Center (1,929); Bowling Green, OH
December 10, 2025*; 6:00 pm, ESPN+		Idaho State	W 73–69	7–3	18 – Tied	11 – Leonhardt	8 – Leonhardt	UCCU Center (1,423); Orem, UT
December 13, 2025*; 12:00 pm, ESPN+		vs. UC Santa Barbara; Salt Lake Slam Showcase	W 68–53	8–3	18 – Welling	11 – Holcombe	10 – Leonhardt	Delta Center (1,987); Salt Lake City, UT
December 17, 2025*; 6:00 pm, ESPN+		Weber State	W 90–74	9–3	22 – Hendricks	7 – Weatherspoon IV	6 – Leonhardt	UCCU Center (1,457); Orem, UT
December 20, 2025*; 3:00 pm, ESPN+		Bethesda	W 109–48	10–3	16 – Holcombe	15 – Holcombe	6 – Leonhardt	UCCU Center (1,426); Orem, UT
WAC regular season
December 29, 2025; 6:00 pm, ESPN+		California Baptist	W 73–66	11–3 (1–0)	25 – Holcombe	4 – Tied	8 – Leonhardt	UCCU Center (2,171); Orem, UT
January 1, 2026; 6:00 pm, ESPN+		at Tarleton	W 91–85	12–3 (2–0)	22 – Holcombe	9 – Hawkins	5 – Leonhardt	EECU Center (987); Stephenville, TX
January 3, 2026; 2:00 pm, ESPN+		at Abilene Christian	L 68–85	12–4 (2–1)	15 – Hendricks	6 – Welling	6 – Holcombe	Moody Coliseum (958); Abilene, TX
January 8, 2026; 6:00 pm, ESPN+		Southern Utah	W 89–72	13–4 (3–1)	23 – Holcombe	9 – Holcombe	6 – Housley	UCCU Center (1,872); Orem, UT
January 10, 2026; 2:00 pm, ESPN+		Utah Tech; Old Hammer Rivalry	W 92–76	14–4 (4–1)	26 – Leonhardt	6 – Davis	7 – Tied	UCCU Center (2,551); Orem, UT
January 17, 2026; 2:00 pm, ESPN+		UT Arlington	W 86–74	15–4 (5–1)	16 – Holcombe	9 – Leonhardt	9 – Leonhardt	UCCU Center (2,517); Orem, UT
January 21, 2026; 6:30 pm, ESPN+		at Southern Utah	L 70–84	15–5 (5–2)	26 – Holcombe	13 – Holcombe	4 – Tied	America First Event Center (1,151); Cedar City, UT
January 24, 2026; 6:00 pm, ESPN+		at California Baptist	L 71–78 ^{OT}	15–6 (5–3)	22 – Holcombe	10 – Holcombe	4 – Leonhardt	Fowler Events Center (3,907); Riverside, CA
January 29, 2026; 6:00 pm, ESPN+		at Tarleton	W 83–55	16–6 (6–3)	20 – Leonhardt	8 – Holcombe	4 – Housley	EECU Center (2,267); Stephenville, TX
February 5, 2026; 6:00 pm		Abilene Christian	W 68–55	17–6 (7–3)	18 – Hendricks	8 – Holcombe	7 – Leonhardt	UCCU Center (1,581); Orem, UT
February 7, 2026; 2:00 pm		UT Arlington	W 81–60	18–6 (8–3)	18 – Hendricks	7 – Hendricks	6 – Leonhardt	UCCU Center (2,245); Orem, UT
February 12, 2026; 7:00 pm, ESPN+		at Utah Tech; Old Hammer Rivalry	L 77–81	18–7 (8–4)	20 – Holcombe	8 – Hawkins	6 – Leonhardt	Burns Arena (2,786); St. George, UT
February 19, 2026; 6:00 pm		California Baptist	W 65–46	19–7 (9–4)	14 – Davis	9 – Hawkins	8 – Leonhardt	UCCU Center (2,364); Orem, UT
February 21, 2026; 1:00 pm		at UT Arlington	W 66–54	20–7 (10–4)	19 – Holcombe	10 – Tied	5 – Holcombe	College Park Center (1,555); Arlington, TX
February 26, 2026; 6:00 pm, ESPN+		Tarleton	W 79–72	21–7 (11–4)	24 – Davis	9 – Holcombe	4 – Tied	UCCU Center (2,355); Orem, UT
February 28, 2026; 2:00 pm, ESPN+		Abilene Christian	W 74–67	22–7 (12–4)	16 – Leonhardt	9 – Leonhardt	7 – Leonhardt	UCCU Center (2,094); Orem, UT
March 5, 2026; 6:30 pm, ESPN+		at Southern Utah	W 92–88	23–7 (13–4)	28 – Davis	8 – Holcombe	7 – Leonardt	America First Event Center (1,540); Cedar City, UT
March 7, 2026; 7:00 pm, ESPN+		at Utah Tech; Old Hammer Rivalry	W 104–101 ^{2OT}	24–7 (14–4)	27 – Weatherspoon	9 – Holcombe	9 – Leonhardt	Burns Arena (3,116); St. George, UT
WAC tournament
March 13, 2026; 7:00 pm, ESPN+	(1)	vs. (4) UT Arlington; Semifinals	W 67–65	25–7	14 – Holcombe	7 – Leonhardt	3 – Leonhardt	Orleans Arena (1,474); Paradise, NV
March 14, 2026; 10:00pm, ESPN2	(1)	vs. (2) California Baptist; Championship	L 61–63	25–8	18 – Holcombe	10 – Leonhardt	8 – Leonhardt	Orleans Arena (1,151); Paradise, NV
NIT
March 18, 2026; 6:00pm, ESPN+	(4 AL)	George Washington; First round	L 78–79	25–9	27 – Holcombe	7 – Davis	7 – Holcombe	UCCU Center (1,582); Orem, UT
*Non-conference game. ^{#}Rankings from AP poll. (#) Tournament seedings in parentheses. AL=Alberquerque. All times are in Mountain.

== See also ==
- 2025–26 Utah Valley Wolverines women's basketball team
