= 2025–26 San Diego State Aztecs men's basketball team =

American college basketball season

2025–26 San Diego State Aztecs men's basketball
- Conference: Mountain West Conference
- Record: 22–11 (14–6 MW)
- Head coach: Brian Dutcher (9th season)
- Assistant coaches: Dave Velasquez (13th season); JayDee Luster (5th season); Ryan Badrtalei (2nd season)
- Offensive scheme: Wheel
- Base defense: Pack-Line
- Home arena: Viejas Arena (Capacity: 12,414)

2025–26 Mountain West Conference men's basketball standings
	Conf.				Overall
Team	W		L	PCT	W		L	PCT
Utah State †	15	–	5	.750	29	–	7	.806
San Diego State	14	–	6	.700	22	–	11	.667
New Mexico	13	–	7	.650	26	–	11	.703
Grand Canyon	13	–	7	.650	20	–	12	.625
Nevada	12	–	8	.600	24	–	13	.649
Boise State	12	–	8	.600	20	–	12	.625
Colorado State	11	–	9	.550	21	–	13	.618
UNLV	11	–	9	.550	18	–	17	.514
Wyoming	9	–	11	.450	18	–	15	.545
Fresno State	7	–	13	.350	13	–	19	.406
San Jose State	3	–	17	.150	9	–	24	.273
Air Force	0	–	20	.000	3	–	29	.094
† 2026 Mountain West tournament winner

The 2025–26 San Diego State Aztecs men's basketball team represented San Diego State University during the 2025–26 NCAA Division I men's basketball season. The Aztecs, led by ninth-year head coach Brian Dutcher, played their home games at Viejas Arena in San Diego, California as a member in the Mountain West Conference.

Following the team's loss in the Mountain West tournament championship game, the team announced that they declined a bid to participate in the NIT.

This season will mark San Diego State's last season as members of the Mountain West Conference, as they will be joining the newly reformed Pac-12 Conference, effective July 1, 2026.

== Previous season ==
The Aztecs finished the 2024-25 season 21–10, 14–7 in Mountain West play to finish in a tie for fourth place. As the 4th seed in the Mountain West Tournament they would lose to 5th seed Boise State in the Quarterfinals. With an invitation to the NCAA tournament they would be an 11th seed but would lose to 11th seed North Carolina in the First Four Play-in.

== Offseason ==
=== Departures ===
Name	Number	Pos.	Height	Weight	Year	Hometown	Reason for departure
Nick Boyd	2	G	6'3"	175	(redshirt) Junior	Garnerville, NY	Transferred to Wisconsin
Wayne McKinney III	3	G	6'0"	198	Senior	Coronado, CA	Graduated
Desai Lopez	4	G	6'3"	190	Senior	Fremont, CA	Graduated
Ryan Schwarz	6	G	5'10"	178	Sophomore	Orinda, CA	
Demarshay Johnson Jr.	11	F	6'10"	222	(redshirt) Junior	Richmond, CA	Transferred to Long Beach State
Kimo Ferrari	23	G	6'0"	178	GS Senior	San Diego, CA	Graduated
Jared Coleman-Jones	31	F	6'10"	235	Senior	Jacksonville, FL	Graduated

=== Incoming transfers ===
Name	Number	Pos.	Height	Weight	Year	Hometown	Previous college
Sean Newman Jr.	4	G	6'1"	174	Senior	Los Angeles, CA	Louisiana Tech
Latrell Davis	6	G	6'3"	212	Junior	Leeds, England	San Jose State
Jeremiah Oden	25	F	6'8"	210	Senior	Chicago, IL	Charlotte

=== 2025 recruiting class ===
College recruiting
Name	Hometown	School	Height	Weight	Commit date
Elzie Harrington #3 SG	Bellflower, CA	St. John Bosco High School	6 ft 4 in (1.93 m)	183 lb (83 kg)	Apr 16, 2025
Elzie Harrington #3 SG	Recruit ratings: Rivals: 247Sports: ESPN: (83)				
Tae Simmons #36 PF	Northridge, CA	Heritage Christian School	6 ft 7 in (2.01 m)	215 lb (98 kg)	Jul 4, 2024
Tae Simmons #36 PF	Recruit ratings: Rivals: 247Sports: ESPN: (80)				
Overall recruit ranking:
Note: In many cases, Scout, Rivals, 247Sports, On3, and ESPN may conflict in their listings of height and weight.; In these cases, the average was taken. ESPN grades are on a 100-point scale.; Sources: "2025 San Diego St. Basketball Commitment List". Rivals.; "2025 San Diego St. Player Commits". ESPN.; "2025 Team Ranking". Rivals.

=== 2026 recruiting class ===
College recruiting (2026)
Name	Hometown	School	Height	Weight	Commit date
Overall recruit ranking:
Note: In many cases, Scout, Rivals, 247Sports, On3, and ESPN may conflict in their listings of height and weight.; In these cases, the average was taken. ESPN grades are on a 100-point scale.; Sources: "2026 San Diego St. Basketball Commitment List". Rivals.; "2026 San Diego St. Player Commits". ESPN.; "2026 Team Ranking". Rivals.

== Roster ==
2025–26 San Diego State Aztecs men's basketball team
Players
Coaches

Pos.	#	Name	Height	Weight	Year	Previous school	Hometown
F	0	Magoon Gwath	7 ft 0 in (2.13 m)	212 lb (96 kg)	RS So	Veritas Prep (CA)	Euless, Texas
G	3	Elzie Harrington	6 ft 5 in (1.96 m)	188 lb (85 kg)	Fr	St. John Bosco	Long Beach, California
G	4	Sean Newman Jr.	6 ft 1 in (1.85 m)	174 lb (79 kg)	RS Sr	Culver City; Fullerton College; Louisiana Tech	Los Angeles, CA
F	5	Pharaoh Compton	6 ft 7 in (2.01 m)	230 lb (104 kg)	So	Arbor View	Chicago, Illinois
G	6	Latrell Davis	6 ft 3 in (1.91 m)	212 lb (96 kg)	Jr	First Baptist Academy (FL); San Jose State	Leeds, England
G	7	Cam Lawin (W)	6 ft 3 in (1.91 m)	181 lb (82 kg)	RS Jr	Orr Academy	Chicago, Illinois
F	8	Tae Simmons	6 ft 6 in (1.98 m)	230 lb (104 kg)	Fr	Heritage Christian (CA)	Simi Valley, California
G	9	Raymar Gonzales (W)	6 ft 3 in (1.91 m)	165 lb (75 kg)	RS Fr	Eastlake	San Diego, California
G	10	BJ Davis	6 ft 2 in (1.88 m)	175 lb (79 kg)	Jr	Modesto Christian School	Modesto, California
G	21	Miles Byrd	6 ft 6 in (1.98 m)	190 lb (86 kg)	RS Jr	Lincoln	Stockton, California
G	24	Taj DeGourville	6 ft 5 in (1.96 m)	211 lb (96 kg)	So	Wasatch Academy	Las Vegas, Nevada
F	25	Jeremiah Oden	6 ft 8 in (2.03 m)	210 lb (95 kg)	RS Sr	Sunrise Christian Academy; Wyoming; DePaul; Charlotte	Chicago, Illinois
F	33	Thokbor Majak	7 ft 1 in (2.16 m)	215 lb (98 kg)	RS Fr	Dream City Christian	Bor, South Sudan
G	39	Reese Dixon-Waters	6 ft 5 in (1.96 m)	217 lb (98 kg)	RS Sr	St. Bernard HS; USC	Long Beach, California
F	40	Miles Heide	6 ft 9 in (2.06 m)	235 lb (107 kg)	Jr	Mount Si	North Bend, Washington

Head coach

- Brian Dutcher (Minnesota)

Assistant coach(es)

- Dave Velasquez (San Diego State)
- JayDee Luster (Wyoming)
- Ryan Badrtalei (UCLA)

Legend

- (C) Team captain
- (S) Suspended
- (I) Ineligible
- (W) Walk-on
- Injured
- Current redshirt

Roster

== Schedule and results ==
Date time, TV	Rank^{#}	Opponent^{#}	Result	Record	High points	High rebounds	High assists	Site (attendance) city, state
Exhibition
October 17, 2025*; 7:00 p.m.		No. 12 UCLA	L 60–67		19 – Dixon-Waters	7 – Heide	2 – Tied	Viejas Arena (9,500); San Diego, CA
October 29, 2025*; 7:00 p.m.		San Diego	W 87–54		17 – Dixon-Waters	8 – Heide	4 – Newman Jr.	Viejas Arena (11,545); San Diego, CA
Regular season
November 4, 2025*; 7:00 p.m., KUSI-TV		Long Beach State	W 77–45	1–0	13 – Byrd	8 – Byrd	3 – Tied	Viejas Arena (11,644); San Diego, CA
November 9, 2025*; 2:00 p.m., KUSI-TV		Idaho State	W 73–57	2–0	15 – Dixon-Waters	6 – Dixon-Waters	6 – Byrd	Viejas Arena (11,526); San Diego, CA
November 18, 2025*; 7:00 p.m., KUSI-TV		Troy	L 107–108 ^{2OT}	2–1	24 – Byrd	9 – Heide	6 – DeGourville	Viejas Arena (11,531); San Diego, CA
November 24, 2025*; 7:30 p.m., TruTV		vs. No. 7 Michigan; Players Era Festival Game 1	L 54–94	2–2	15 – Harrington	8 – Heide	5 – Heide	MGM Grand Garden Arena; Paradise, NV
November 25, 2025*; 8:00 p.m., TNT		vs. Oregon; Players Era Festival Game 2	W 97–80	3–2	22 – Dixon-Waters	6 – Gwath	4 – Tied	MGM Grand Garden Arena; Paradise, NV
November 26, 2025*; 7:30 p.m., truTV		vs. Baylor; Players Era Festival Consolation Game	L 81–91	3–3	13 – Byrd	7 – Oden	6 – Newman Jr.	Michelob Ultra Arena; Paradise, NV
December 3, 2025*; 7:00 p.m., KUSI-TV		Utah Valley	W 77–66	4–3	18 – BJ Davis	7 – Simmons	4 – DeGourville	Viejas Arena (11,683); San Diego, CA
December 10, 2025*; 7:00 p.m., KUSI-TV		Lamar	W 89–71	5–3	19 – Byrd	7 – Heide	4 – Byrd	Viejas Arena (11,257); San Diego, CA
December 17, 2025; 7:00 p.m., CBSSN		Air Force	W 81–58	6–3 (1–0)	19 – BJ Davis	8 – Heide	6 – Tied	Viejas Arena (10,727); San Diego, CA
December 20, 2025*; 7:30 p.m., ESPN2		vs. No. 1 Arizona; Hall of Fame Series – Phoenix	L 45–68	6–4	8 – Dixon-Waters	5 – Tied	2 – Tied	Mortgage Matchup Center (10,567); Phoenix, AZ
December 22, 2025*; 1:00 p.m., KUSI-TV		Whittier	W 121–59	7–4	21 – Compton	8 – Compton	9 – DeGourville	Viejas Arena (9,761); San Diego, CA
December 30, 2025; 7:00 p.m., CBSSN		at San Jose State	W 81–68	8–4 (2–0)	18 – Davis	6 – Compton	4 – Harrington	Provident Credit Union Event Center (3,585); San Jose, CA
January 3, 2026; 7:00 p.m., CBSSN		Boise State	W 110–107 ^{3OT}	9–4 (3–0)	22 – Davis	11 – Davis	6 – Tied	Viejas Arena (10,295); San Diego, CA
January 6, 2026; 8:00 p.m., FS1		at Nevada	W 73–68	10–4 (4–0)	14 – Byrd	7 – Tied	5 – Byrd	Lawlor Events Center (8,005); Reno, NV
January 10, 2026; 8:00 p.m., CBSSN		Fresno State	W 71–52	11–4 (5–0)	18 – Gwath	9 – Dixon-Waters	6 – Byrd	Viejas Arena (10,544); San Diego, CA
January 14, 2026; 5:00 p.m., CBSSN		at Wyoming	W 74–57	12–4 (6–0)	13 – Dixon-Waters	6 – Gwath	4 – Byrd	Arena-Auditorium (4,556); Laramie, WY
January 17, 2026; 5:00 p.m., CBSSN		New Mexico	W 83–79	13–4 (7–0)	21 – Byrd	9 – Dixon-Waters	3 – Byrd	Viejas Arena (12,414); San Diego, CA
January 21, 2026; 8:00 p.m., FS1		at Grand Canyon	L 69–70	13–5 (7–1)	16 – Harrington	9 – Simmons	3 – Byrd	Global Credit Union Arena (7,179); Phoenix, AZ
January 24, 2026; 1:00 p.m., CBS		at UNLV	W 82–71	14–5 (8–1)	23 – Byrd	7 – Dixon-Waters	5 – Byrd	Thomas & Mack Center (7,217); Paradise, NV
January 28, 2026; 7:30 p.m., FS1		Colorado State	W 73–50	15–5 (9–1)	16 – Dixon-Waters	5 – Tied	5 – Davis	Viejas Arena (12,414); San Diego, CA
January 31, 2026; 10:00 a.m., CBS		at Utah State	L 66–71	15–6 (9–2)	19 – Dixon-Waters	5 – Davis	5 – Newman Jr.	Smith Spectrum (10,270); Logan, UT
February 3, 2026; 8:00 p.m., CBSSN		Wyoming	W 72–63	16–6 (10–2)	23 – Dixon-Waters	8 – Byrd	6 – DeGourville	Viejas Arena (11,614); San Diego, CA
February 7, 2026; 5:00 p.m., FS1		at Air Force	W 88–54	17–6 (11–2)	16 – Davis	5 – Tied	5 – DeGourville	Clune Arena (1,741); Colorado Springs, CO
February 14, 2026; 7:00 p.m., CBSSN		Nevada	W 71–57	18–6 (12–2)	20 – Dixon-Waters	7 – Heide	5 – Davis	Viejas Arena (12,414); San Diego, CA
February 17, 2026; 8:00 p.m., CBSSN		Grand Canyon	L 63–73	18–7 (12–3)	18 – Byrd	7 – Gwath	3 – Newman Jr.	Viejas Arena (12,414); San Diego, CA
February 21, 2026; 3:00 p.m., CBSSN		at Colorado State	L 74–83	18–8 (12–4)	16 – Dixon-Waters	9 – Byrd	4 – Byrd	Moby Arena (7,006); Fort Collins, CO
February 25, 2026; 8:00 p.m., FS1		Utah State	W 89–72	19–8 (13–4)	20 – Dixon-Waters	9 – Gwath	8 – DeGourville	Viejas Arena (12,414); San Diego, CA
February 28, 2026; 11:00 a.m., CBS		at New Mexico	L 76–81	19–9 (13–5)	17 – Byrd	7 – Tied	6 – DeGourville	The Pit (15,411); Albuquerque, NM
March 3, 2026; 6:00 p.m., CBSSN		at Boise State	L 77–86	19–10 (13–6)	23 – Dixon-Waters	3 – Tied	4 – Byrd	ExtraMile Arena (12,171); Boise, ID
March 6, 2026; 7:00 p.m., CBSSN		UNLV	W 89–86	20–10 (14–6)	30 – Davis	6 – Dixon-Waters	4 – Tied	Viejas Arena (12,414); San Diego, CA
Mountain West tournament
March 12, 2026; 6:00 pm, CBSSN	(2)	vs. (7) Colorado State; Quarterfinals	W 71–62	21–10	12 – Byrd	8 – Tied	3 – DeGourville	Thomas & Mack Center; Paradise, NV
March 13, 2026; 9:00 pm, CBSSN	(2)	vs. (3) New Mexico; Semifinals	W 64–62	22–10	17 – Gwath	8 – Simmons	6 – Davis	Thomas & Mack Center (9,048); Paradise, NV
March 14, 2026; 3:00 pm, CBS/Paramount+	(2)	vs. (1) Utah State; Championship	L 62–73	22–11	20 – Dixon-Waters	8 – Gwath	5 – DeGourville	Thomas & Mack Center (6,451); Paradise, NV
*Non-conference game. ^{#}Rankings from AP Poll. (#) Tournament seedings in parentheses. All times are in Pacific Time.

== Rankings ==
Ranking movements Legend: ██ Increase in ranking ██ Decrease in ranking — = Not ranked RV = Received votes
	Week																				
Poll	Pre	1	2	3	4	5	6	7	8	9	10	11	12	13	14	15	16	17	18	19	Final
AP	RV	RV	RV	—	—	—	—	—	—*	—	—	—	—	—	—	—	—	—	—	—	—
Coaches	RV	RV	RV	—	—	—	—	—	—	—	—	—	—	—	—	—	—	—	—	—	—

*AP did not release a week 8 poll.
