= 2025–26 Abilene Christian Wildcats men's basketball team =

American college basketball season

2025–26 Abilene Christian Wildcats men's basketball
- Conference: Western Athletic Conference
- Record: 14–19 (5–13 WAC)
- Head coach: Brette Tanner (5th season)
- Assistant coaches: Ted Crass; Cameron Henderson; Doug Karleskint; Danny Young
- Home arena: Moody Coliseum

2025–26 WAC men's basketball standings
	Conf.				Overall
Team	W		L	PCT	W		L	PCT
Utah Valley	14	–	4	.778	24	–	7	.774
California Baptist	13	–	5	.722	23	–	8	.742
Utah Tech	11	–	7	.611	19	–	14	.576
UT Arlington	9	–	9	.500	18	–	13	.581
Southern Utah	6	–	12	.333	10	–	22	.313
Abilene Christian	5	–	13	.278	14	–	19	.424
Tarleton	5	–	13	.278	14	–	18	.438
† 2026 WAC tournament winner As of March 12, 2026

The 2025–26 Abilene Christian Wildcats men's basketball team represented Abilene Christian University (ACU) during the 2025–26 NCAA Division I men's basketball season. The Wildcats, led by fifth-year head coach Brette Tanner, played their home games at Moody Coliseum in Abilene, Texas, as members of the Western Athletic Conference (WAC).

Effective in 2026–27, the WAC will rebrand as the United Athletic Conference (UAC), with ACU remaining a member of the rebranded conference.

== Previous season ==
The Wildcats finished the 2024–25 season 16–16, 8–8 in WAC play, to finish in a tie for fourth place. They were defeated by Seattle in the quarterfinals of the WAC tournament.

== Preseason ==
On October 28, 2025, the WAC released their preseason coaches poll. Abilene Christian was picked to finish third in the conference.

=== Preseason rankings ===
WAC Preseason Poll
Place	Team	Points
1	California Baptist	33 (5)
2	Utah Valley	29 (1)
3	Abilene Christian	27
4	UT Arlington	22 (1)
5	Tarleton State	19
6	Utah Tech	9
7	Southern Utah	8
(#) first-place votes

=== Preseason All-WAC Team ===
Preseason All-WAC Team
Player	Year	Position
Bradyn Hubbard	Senior	Forward

== Roster ==
2025–26 Abilene Christian Wildcats men's basketball team
Players
Coaches

Pos.	#	Name	Height	Weight	Year	Previous school	Hometown
G	0	Zy Wright	6 ft 5 in (1.96 m)	—	Sr	Chadron State	Lincolnton, Georgia
G	2	Yaniel Rivera	6 ft 3 in (1.91 m)	180 lb (82 kg)	Jr	Dade Christian School	Bayamón, Puerto Rico
G	3	Tylan Lewis	6 ft 0 in (1.83 m)	200 lb (91 kg)	Fr	Independence High School	Nashville, Tennessee
G	4	Rich Smith	6 ft 2 in (1.88 m)	180 lb (82 kg)	Sr	St. Thomas Aquinas College	Bronx, New York
G	5	Cbo Newton	6 ft 3 in (1.91 m)	190 lb (86 kg)	RS So	Grambling State	Ruston, Louisiana
G	7	Christian Alston	6 ft 7 in (2.01 m)	200 lb (91 kg)	So	Bartlett High School	Memphis, Tennessee
F	10	Joseph Scott	6 ft 9 in (2.06 m)	210 lb (95 kg)	Jr	Mineral Area College	Baltimore, Maryland
F	11	Ma'Shy Hill	6 ft 8 in (2.03 m)	250 lb (113 kg)	Jr	SPIRE Academy	Austin, Texas
F	15	Bradyn Hubbard	6 ft 5 in (1.96 m)	235 lb (107 kg)	Sr	Connors State College	Tulsa, Oklahoma
G	20	Isaiah Carrillo	5 ft 10 in (1.78 m)	165 lb (75 kg)	Fr	Wylie High School	Abilene, Texas
F	21	Cade Hornecker	7 ft 0 in (2.13 m)	250 lb (113 kg)	RS Jr	Southern Illinois	Amarillo, Texas
G	23	Joseph Venzant	6 ft 2 in (1.88 m)	210 lb (95 kg)	RS Sr	Liberty	Midland, Texas
G	24	Isaac Dye	6 ft 2 in (1.88 m)	200 lb (91 kg)	Fr	State College Area High School	State College, Pennsylvania

Head coach

- Brette Tanner (Emporia State)

Assistant coach(es)

- Ted Crass (Little Rock)
- Cameron Henderson (Montana State)
- Doug Karleskint (MidAmerica Nazarene)
- Danny Young (Grand Canyon)

Legend

- (C) Team captain
- (S) Suspended
- (I) Ineligible
- (W) Walk-on
- Injured
- Current redshirt

Roster
Last update: October 31, 2025

== Schedule and results ==
Date time, TV	Rank^{#}	Opponent^{#}	Result	Record	High points	High rebounds	High assists	Site (attendance) city, state
Exhibition
October 25, 2025*; 2:00 pm		at Texas A&M–Corpus Christi	W 82–77	–	25 – Hubbard	8 – Hubbard	9 – Smith	Dugan Wellness Center (976); Corpus Christi, TX
Non-conference regular season
November 3, 2025*; 8:00 pm, ESPN+		McMurry	W 92–55	1–0	16 – Scott	6 – Tied	6 – Smith	Moody Coliseum (1,523); Abilene, TX
November 6, 2025*; 7:00 pm, ESPN+		Omaha	W 73–71	2–0	26 – Hubbard	7 – Hubbard	5 – Tied	Moody Coliseum (1,025); Abilene, TX
November 11, 2025*; 3:00 pm, ESPN+		Southwestern Adventist	W 104–63	3–0	20 – Dye	9 – Scott	4 – Dye	Moody Coliseum (654); Abilene, TX
November 14, 2025*; 8:00 pm, ESPN+		at Stephen F. Austin	L 66–76	3–1	19 – Rivera	8 – Tied	3 – Newton	William R. Johnson Coliseum; Nacogdoches, TX
November 18, 2025*; 7:00 pm, ESPN+		at Texas State	L 49–63	3–2	13 – Hubbard	4 – Wright	4 – Rivera	Strahan Arena (1,215); San Marcos, TX
November 24, 2025*; 8:00 pm, PTB Live		vs. UTSA; Jacksonville Classic	W 61–50	4–2	21 – Hubbard	8 – Hubbard	5 – Smith	John Hurst Adams Gymnasium (562); Jacksonville, FL
November 25, 2025*; 5:30 pm, PTB Live		vs. William & Mary; Jacksonville Classic	L 58–92	4–3	10 – Tied	7 – Hubbard	5 – Smith	John Hurst Adams Gymnasium (246); Jacksonville, FL
November 28, 2025*; 3:00 pm, ESPN+		Jarvis Christian	W 87–55	5–3	25 – Hubbard	11 – Wright	5 – Tied	Moody Coliseum (584); Abilene, TX
December 2, 2025*; 8:00 pm, ESPN+		at Pepperdine	W 71–63	6–3	15 – Hubbard	5 – Tied	6 – Smith	Firestone Fieldhouse (511); Malibu, CA
December 6, 2025*; 3:00 pm, ESPN+		New Mexico State	W 77–69	7–3	17 – Newton	8 – Scott	4 – Rivera	Moody Coliseum (923); Abilene, TX
December 16, 2025*; 8:00 pm, ESPN+		at No. 1 Arizona	L 62−96	7−4	15 – Scott	5 – Hornecker	4 – Smith	McKale Center (13,092); Tucson, AZ
December 19, 2025*; 8:30 pm, TNT/TruTV		at No. 10 BYU	L 67–85	7–5	23 – Newton	6 – Venzant	6 – Smith	Marriott Center (17,958); Provo, UT
December 22, 2025*; 4:00 pm, YouTube		at Texas Southern	W 75–68	8–5	22 – Hubbard	6 – Hubbard	5 – Smith	H&PE Arena (639); Houston, TX
WAC regular season
January 1, 2026; 7:00 pm, ESPN+		Utah Tech	L 64–79	8–6 (0–1)	22 – Smith	7 – Scott	6 – Smith	Moody Coliseum (718); Abilene, TX
January 3, 2026; 3:00 pm, ESPN+		Utah Valley	W 85–68	9–6 (1–1)	22 – Hubbard	10 – Hubbard	7 – Smith	Moody Coliseum (958); Abilene, TX
January 8, 2026; 7:00 pm, ESPN+		at Tarleton State	W 84–80	10–6 (2–1)	22 – Hubbard	10 – Hornecker	3 – Tied	Wisdom Gym (1,567); Stephenville, TX
January 10, 2026; 2:00 pm, ESPN+		at UT Arlington	L 72–82	10–7 (2–2)	27 – Hubbard	5 – Venzant	8 – Smith	College Park Center (1,373); Arlington, TX
January 15, 2026; 7:00 pm, ESPN+		California Baptist	L 58–74	10–8 (2–3)	22 – Smith	5 – Hubbard	6 – Smith	Moody Coliseum (1,229); Abilene, TX
January 17, 2026; 7:30 pm, ESPN+		at Southern Utah	L 52–74	10–9 (2–4)	14 – Hubbard	9 – Venzant	5 – Smith	America First Event Center (805); Cedar City, UT
January 29, 2026; 7:00 pm, ESPN+		Utah Tech	L 70–76	10–10 (2–5)	18 – Rivera	8 – Tied	5 – Smith	Moody Coliseum (1,261); Abilene, TX
January 31, 2026; 3:00 pm, ESPN+		Southern Utah	L 76–79	10–11 (2–6)	18 – Smith	4 – Hill	5 – Tied	Moody Coliseum (1,329); Abilene, TX
February 5, 2026; 7:00 pm, ESPN+		at Utah Valley	L 55–68	10–12 (2–7)	13 – Tied	6 – Tied	7 – Smith	UCCU Center (1,581); Orem, UT
February 7, 2026; 7:00 pm, ESPN+		at California Baptist	L 63–65	10–13 (2–8)	16 – Hubbard	9 – Smith	3 – Smith	Fowler Events Center (3,079); Riverside, CA
February 12, 2026; 8:00 pm, ESPNU		UT Arlington	W 67–63	11–13 (3–8)	21 – Hubbard	5 – Tied	5 – Smith	Moody Coliseum (1,818); Abilene, TX
February 14, 2026; 3:00 pm, ESPN+		Tarleton State	W 73–59	12–13 (4–8)	19 – Hubbard	7 – Venzant	6 – Rivera	Moody Coliseum (1,196); Abilene, TX
February 16, 2026; 7:00 pm, ESPN+		at Tarleton State	L 62–65 ^{OT}	12–14 (4–9)	24 – Hubbard	10 – Hornecker	3 – Rivera	Wisdom Gym (2,183); Stephenville, TX
February 21, 2026; 3:00 pm, ESPN+		Southern Utah	W 87–83	13–14 (5–9)	16 – Newton	5 – Hornecker	7 – Smith	Moody Coliseum (1,174); Abilene, TX
February 26, 2026; 8:00 pm, ESPN+		at Utah Tech	L 81–85	13–15 (5–10)	27 – Newton	5 – Hubbard	4 – Smith	Burns Arena (2,274); St. George, UT
February 28, 2026; 3:00 pm, ESPN+		at Utah Valley	L 67–74	13–16 (5–11)	18 – Alston	6 – Alston	6 – Smith	UCCU Center (2,094); Orem, UT
March 5, 2026; 9:00 pm, ESPN+		at California Baptist	L 48–87	13–17 (5–12)	14 – Hubbard	4 – Tied	2 – Lewis	Fowler Events Center (4,681); Riverside, CA
March 7, 2026; 6:00 pm, ESPN+		UT Arlington	L 57–64	13–18 (5–13)	16 – Hubbard	5 – Tied	2 – Tied	Moody Coliseum (1,080); Abilene, TX
WAC tournament
March 11, 2026; 7:30 pm, ESPN+	(6)	vs. (7) Tarleton; First round	W 84–78	14–18	20 – Rivera	6 – Hubbard	7 – Smith	Orleans Arena (760); Las Vegas, NV
March 12, 2026; 10:30 pm, ESPN+	(6)	vs. (3) Utah Tech; Quarterfinals	L 74–80	14–19	19 – Tied	6 – Hubbard	5 – Tied	Orleans Arena (1,029); Las Vegas, NV
*Non-conference game. ^{#}Rankings from AP Poll. (#) Tournament seedings in parentheses. All times are in Central.
