= 2025–26 Southern Utah Thunderbirds men's basketball team =

American college basketball season

2025–26 Southern Utah Thunderbirds men's basketball
- Conference: Western Athletic Conference
- Record: 10–22 (6–12 WAC)
- Head coach: Rob Jeter (3rd season)
- Assistant coaches: Will Ryan; Donald Williams; Shaun Gutting; Tennessee Owens
- Home arena: America First Event Center

2025–26 WAC men's basketball standings
	Conf.				Overall
Team	W		L	PCT	W		L	PCT
Utah Valley	14	–	4	.778	24	–	7	.774
California Baptist	13	–	5	.722	23	–	8	.742
Utah Tech	11	–	7	.611	19	–	14	.576
UT Arlington	9	–	9	.500	18	–	13	.581
Southern Utah	6	–	12	.333	10	–	22	.313
Abilene Christian	5	–	13	.278	14	–	19	.424
Tarleton	5	–	13	.278	14	–	18	.438
† 2026 WAC tournament winner As of March 12, 2026

The 2025–26 Southern Utah Thunderbirds men's basketball team represented Southern Utah University during the 2025–26 NCAA Division I men's basketball season. The Thunderbirds, led by third-year head coach Rob Jeter, played their home games at America First Event Center in Cedar City, Utah as members of the Western Athletic Conference (WAC).

This was Southern Utah's final season as members of the WAC, as they will be joining the Big Sky Conference, effective July 1, 2026. The Thunderbirds finished the regular season with a 10–21 overall and 6–12 conference record, before losing in the quarterfinal round of the WAC tournament to 4-seed UT Arlington.

== Previous season ==
The Thunderbirds finished the 2024–25 season 12–19, 4–12 in WAC play, to finish in eighth place. They were defeated by Utah Tech in the first round of the WAC tournament.

== Preseason ==
On October 28, 2025, the WAC released their preseason coaches poll. Southern Utah was picked to finish seventh (last) in the conference.

=== Preseason rankings ===
WAC Preseason Poll
Place	Team	Points
1	California Baptist	33 (5)
2	Utah Valley	29 (1)
3	Abilene Christian	27
4	UT Arlington	22 (1)
5	Tarleton State	19
6	Utah Tech	9
7	Southern Utah	8
(#) first-place votes

=== Preseason All-WAC Team ===
No players were named to the Preseason All-WAC Team.

== Roster ==
2025–26 Southern Utah Thunderbirds men's basketball team
Players
Coaches

Pos.	#	Name	Height	Weight	Year	Previous school	Hometown
F	0	Isaiah Cottrell	6 ft 11 in (2.11 m)	245 lb (111 kg)	Sr	UNLV	Las Vegas, Nevada
G	1	Elijah Duval	6 ft 3 in (1.91 m)	—	Fr	Orangeville Prep	Wilmington, Delaware
G	2	Logan Stephens	6 ft 3 in (1.91 m)	200 lb (91 kg)	Sr	Tulane	Decatur, Georgia
G	3	Tanner Hayhurst	6 ft 6 in (1.98 m)	204 lb (93 kg)	Jr	College of Southern Idaho	Eagle, Idaho
G	4	Lorenzo Abellar	5 ft 10 in (1.78 m)	—	Sr	College of Southern Nevada	Las Vegas, Nevada
G	5	Zach Bell	6 ft 2 in (1.88 m)	180 lb (82 kg)	Jr	Jacksonville	Barnwell, South Carolina
G	7	Zeplin Kidd	6 ft 7 in (2.01 m)	—	Fr	King's Ridge Christian School	Atlanta, Georgia
G	9	Jalen (Roc) Lee	6 ft 7 in (2.01 m)	—	So	LIU	Atlanta, Georgia
G	10	Langston Binns	6 ft 2 in (1.88 m)	—	Sr	Central Lakes College	Saint Paul, Minnesota
F	11	Juok Riak	6 ft 8 in (2.03 m)	—	So	Drury	Madison, Wisconsin
G	13	Brayden Johnson	6 ft 1 in (1.85 m)	—	So	Kishwaukee College	Tulsa, Oklahoma
G	20	Dylan Jones	6 ft 6 in (1.98 m)	190 lb (86 kg)	Sr	Fairleigh Dickinson	Saratoga Springs, Utah
F	23	Chuks Isitua	6 ft 10 in (2.08 m)	226 lb (103 kg)	RS So	Fresno State	Lagos, Nigeria
F	24	Cale Barclay	6 ft 8 in (2.03 m)	—	Fr	Herriman High School	Herriman, Utah
C	25	Kai Burdick	7 ft 0 in (2.13 m)	—	Sr	MiraCosta College	Carlsbad, California
F	35	Jaiden Feroah	6 ft 9 in (2.06 m)	214 lb (97 kg)	Sr	Holy Cross	Draper, Utah

Head coach

- Rob Jeter (UW–Platteville)

Assistant coach(es)

- Will Ryan (Milwaukee)
- Donald Williams (Cal State Hayward)
- Shaun Gutting (Colorado State)
- Tennessee Owens (New Mexico State)

Legend

- (C) Team captain
- (S) Suspended
- (I) Ineligible
- (W) Walk-on
- Injured
- Current redshirt

Roster
Last update: November 1, 2025

== Schedule and results ==
Date time, TV	Rank^{#}	Opponent^{#}	Result	Record	High points	High rebounds	High assists	Site (attendance) city, state
Exhibition
October 24, 2025*; 6:30 pm		Westminster	W 79–77		–	–	–	America First Event Center; Cedar City, UT
Non-conference regular season
November 4, 2025*; 7:00 pm, ESPN+		at Arizona State	L 64−81	0−1	17 – Duval	7 – Tied	3 – Duval	Desert Financial Arena (7,513); Tempe, AZ
November 8, 2025*; 6:30 pm, ESPN+		UT Rio Grande Valley	L 72–95	0–2	24 – Feroah	10 – Feroah	4 – Duval	America First Event Center (1,489); Cedar City, UT
November 11, 2025*; 6:30 pm, ESPN+		Bethesda	W 118–60	1–2	19 – Lee	9 – Cottrell	8 – Duval	America First Event Center (801); Cedar City, UT
November 15, 2025*; 6:00 pm, SLN		at Omaha	L 85–90	1–3	20 – Tied	9 – Feroah	5 – Duval	Baxter Arena (3,515); Omaha, NE
November 17, 2025*; 7:00 pm, ESPN+		at No. 13 Gonzaga	L 50–122	1–4	10 – Duval	5 – Cottrell	2 – Feroah	McCarthey Athletic Center (6,000); Spokane, WA
November 19, 2025*; 9:00 pm, ESPN+		at Washington State	L 74–98	1–5	24 – Jones	4 – Jones	3 – Duval	Beasley Coliseum (2,532); Pullman, WA
November 22, 2025*; 6:30 pm, ESPN+		Nobel	W 103–68	2–5	15 – Jones	6 – Cottrell	3 – Tied	America First Event Center (709); Cedar City, UT
November 28, 2025*; 12:00 pm, ESPN+		at Robert Morris; Urban-Bennett Invitational	L 54–61	2–6	17 – Tied	10 – Cottrell	5 – Duval	UPMC Events Center; Moon Township, PA
November 29, 2025*; 12:00 pm, ESPN+		vs. Stetson; Urban-Bennett Invitational	W 70–68	3–6	26 – Duval	9 – Cottrell	3 – Tied	UPMC Events Center (235); Moon Township, PA
December 1, 2025*; 6:30 pm, ESPN+		West Coast Baptist	W 124–59	4–6	26 – Jones	8 – Burdick	4 – Barclay	America First Event Center (565); Cedar City, UT
December 6, 2025*; 3:00 pm, ESPN+		at Oregon State	L 70–81	4–7	27 – Feroah	6 – Duval	5 – Feroah	Gill Coliseum (2,364); Corvallis, OR
December 13, 2025*; 4:00 pm, BTN		at Washington	L 69–105	4–8	18 – Duval	9 – Duval	6 – Duval	Alaska Airlines Arena (5,516); Seattle, WA
December 18, 2025*; 5:00 pm, ESPN+		at Northern Arizona	L 57–65	4–9	12 – Bell	11 – Feroah	3 – Tied	Findlay Toyota Court (412); Flagstaff, AZ
WAC regular season
December 29, 2025; 7:00 pm, ESPN+		at Utah Tech	L 66–80	4–10 (0–1)	12 – Jones	8 – Cottrell	3 – Duval	Burns Arena (2,524); St. George, UT
January 3, 2026; 6:30 pm, ESPN+		UT Arlington	L 77–86	4–11 (0–2)	13 – Tied	10 – Feroah	5 – Cottrell	America First Event Center (796); Cedar City, UT
January 8, 2026; 6:00 pm, ESPN+		at Utah Valley	L 72–89	4–12 (0–3)	15 – Lee	6 – Tied	5 – Feorah	UCCU Center (1,872); Orem, UT
January 10, 2026; 6:00 pm, ESPN+		at California Baptist	L 55–58	4–13 (0–4)	16 – Feroah	6 – Tied	3 – Duval	Fowler Events Center (3,438); Riverside, CA
January 15, 2026; 6:30 pm, ESPN+		Tarleton State	W 106–105 ^{OT}	5–13 (1–4)	22 – Jones	9 – Feroah	5 – Abellar	America First Event Center (955); Cedar City, UT
January 17, 2026; 6:30 pm, ESPN+		Abilene Christian	W 74–52	6–13 (2–4)	16 – Feroah	12 – Cottrell	5 – Abellar	America First Event Center (805); Cedar City, UT
January 21, 2026; 6:30 pm, ESPN+		Utah Valley	W 84–70	7–13 (3–4)	26 – Holcombe	13 – Holcombe	4 – Tied	America First Event Center (1,151); Cedar City, UT
January 24, 2026; 7:00 pm, ESPN+		at Utah Tech	L 91–102	7–14 (3–5)	35 – Feroah	12 – Feroah	8 – Duval	Burns Arena (3,833); St. George, UT
January 29, 2026; 6:00 pm, ESPN+		at UT Arlington	L 61–80	7–15 (3–6)	14 – Tied	7 – Burdick	2 – Tied	College Park Center (1,140); Arlington, TX
January 31, 2026; 2:00 pm, ESPN+		at Abilene Christian	W 79–76	8–15 (4–6)	27 – Duval	7 – Tied	3 – Tied	Moody Coliseum (1,329); Abilene, TX
February 7, 2026; 6:30 pm, ESPN+		Tarleton State	L 59–62	8–16 (4–7)	18 – Duval	9 – Tied	7 – Duval	America First Event Center (853); Cedar City, UT
February 12, 2026; 6:30 pm, ESPN+		California Baptist	L 66–83	8–17 (4–8)	24 – Cottrell	10 – Burdick	4 – Duval	America First Event Center (771); Cedar City, UT
February 14, 2026; 1:00 pm, ESPN+		at UT Arlington	W 78–73	9–17 (5–8)	20 – Duval	9 – Cottrell	3 – Tied	College Park Center (1,152); Arlington, TX
February 19, 2026; 6:00 pm, ESPN+		at Tarleton State	L 74–78	9–18 (5–9)	23 – Duval	16 – Cottrell	4 – Hayhurst	EECU Center (3,187); Stephenville, TX
February 21, 2026; 2:00 pm, ESPN+		at Abilene Christian	L 83–87	9–19 (5–10)	20 – Stephens	7 – Cottrell	4 – Duval	Moody Coliseum (1,174); Abilene, TX
February 28, 2026; 6:30 pm, ESPN+		Utah Tech	W 81–67	10–19 (6–10)	25 – Hayhurst	14 – Feroah	4 – Tied	America First Event Center (2,231); Cedar City, UT
March 5, 2026; 6:30 pm, ESPN+		Utah Valley	L 88–92	10–20 (6–11)	20 – Duval	4 – Tied	4 – Duval	America First Event Center (1,540); Cedar City, UT
March 7, 2026; 6:30 pm, ESPN+		California Baptist	L 75–82	10–21 (6–12)	30 – Duval	8 – Burdick	4 – Duval	America First Event Center (602); Cedar City, UT
WAC tournament
March 12, 2026; 7:00 pm, ESPN+	(5)	vs. (4) UT Arlington; Quarterfinals	L 63–69	10–22	18 – Feroah	9 – Burdick	3 – Burdick	Orleans Arena (1,029); Paradise, NV
*Non-conference game. ^{#}Rankings from AP Poll. (#) Tournament seedings in parentheses. All times are in Mountain.
