= 2025–26 UT Arlington Mavericks men's basketball team =

American college basketball season

2025–26 UT Arlington Mavericks men's basketball
- Conference: Western Athletic Conference
- Record: 18–14 (9–9 WAC)
- Head coach: K. T. Turner (3rd season)
- Assistant coaches: Sean Stout; Keith Pickens; Jeremy Pope; Cody San Miguel; Derrick Obasohan
- Home arena: College Park Center

2025–26 WAC men's basketball standings
	Conf.				Overall
Team	W		L	PCT	W		L	PCT
Utah Valley	14	–	4	.778	25	–	8	.758
California Baptist †	13	–	5	.722	25	–	8	.758
Utah Tech	11	–	7	.611	19	–	15	.559
UT Arlington	9	–	9	.500	18	–	14	.563
Southern Utah	6	–	12	.333	10	–	22	.313
Abilene Christian	5	–	13	.278	14	–	19	.424
Tarleton	5	–	13	.278	14	–	18	.438
† 2026 WAC tournament winner As of March 14, 2026

The 2025–26 UT Arlington Mavericks men's basketball team represented the University of Texas at Arlington during the 2025–26 NCAA Division I men's basketball season. The Mavericks, led by third-year head coach K. T. Turner, played their home games at College Park Center in Arlington, Texas as members of the Western Athletic Conference (WAC).

Effective in 2026–27, the WAC will rebrand as the United Athletic Conference (UAC), with UTA remaining a member of the rebranded conference.

== Previous season ==
The Mavericks finished the 2024–25 season 13–18, 6–10 in WAC play, to finish in seventh place. They were defeated by eventual tournament champions Grand Canyon in the quarterfinals of the WAC tournament.

== Preseason ==
On October 28, 2025, the WAC released their preseason coaches poll. UT Arlington was picked to finish fourth in the conference, while receiving one first-place vote.

=== Preseason rankings ===
WAC Preseason Poll
Place	Team	Points
1	California Baptist	33 (5)
2	Utah Valley	29 (1)
3	Abilene Christian	27
4	UT Arlington	22 (1)
5	Tarleton State	19
6	Utah Tech	9
7	Southern Utah	8
(#) first-place votes

=== Preseason All-WAC Team ===
Preseason All-WAC Team
Player	Year	Position
Raysean Seamster	Senior	Forward

== Roster ==
2025–26 UT Arlington Mavericks men's basketball team
Players
Coaches

Pos.	#	Name	Height	Weight	Year	Previous school	Hometown
G	0	Jordan Lowery	6 ft 1 in (1.85 m)	170 lb (77 kg)	Fr	Denton Guyer High School	Denton, Texas
G	1	Cash Chavis	6 ft 2 in (1.88 m)	180 lb (82 kg)	So	Arkansas	Minneapolis, Minnesota
F	2	Raysean Seamster	6 ft 7 in (2.01 m)	200 lb (91 kg)	Sr	Eastern Arizona	Portland, Oregon
G	3	Tyran Mason	6 ft 6 in (1.98 m)	195 lb (88 kg)	So	North Texas	Plano, Texas
G	4	Marcus Rigsby Jr.	6 ft 3 in (1.91 m)	200 lb (91 kg)	Sr	Troy	Fort Worth, Texas
F/C	5	Miles Goodman	6 ft 11 in (2.11 m)	225 lb (102 kg)	So	Penn State	Seattle, Washington
G	7	Alex Bossinakis	6 ft 2 in (1.88 m)	200 lb (91 kg)	RS Jr	LeTourneau	North Richland Hills, Texas
G	8	Bahsil Laster	6 ft 4 in (1.93 m)	180 lb (82 kg)	So	Harcum College	Philadelphia, Pennsylvania
G	11	Jayden Smoot	6 ft 1 in (1.85 m)	180 lb (82 kg)	Fr	Rancho Christian High School	Los Angeles, California
G	12	Augustine Youssef	6 ft 0 in (1.83 m)	190 lb (86 kg)	Fr	Desert Christian Academy	Indio, California
F	21	Stoney Hadnot	6 ft 6 in (1.98 m)	200 lb (91 kg)	So	South Dakota State	Houston, Texas
F/C	33	Amari Reed	6 ft 8 in (2.03 m)	210 lb (95 kg)	Fr	Lancaster High School	Lancaster, Texas
F/C	34	Cameron Jackson	6 ft 8 in (2.03 m)	240 lb (109 kg)	So	Weiss High School	Pflugerville, Texas
G	42	Marcell McCreary	6 ft 4 in (1.93 m)	225 lb (102 kg)	Sr	Northern Colorado	Fort Worth, Texas

Head coach

- K. T. Turner (Oklahoma City)

Assistant coach(es)

- Sean Stout (North Carolina)
- Keith Pickens (Missouri State)
- Jeremy Pope (Biola)
- Cody San Miguel (Texas State)
- Derrick Obasohan (UT Arlington)

Legend

- (C) Team captain
- (S) Suspended
- (I) Ineligible
- (W) Walk-on
- Injured
- Current redshirt

Roster
Last update: November 2, 2025

== Schedule and results ==
Date time, TV	Rank^{#}	Opponent^{#}	Result	Record	High points	High rebounds	High assists	Site (attendance) city, state
Non-conference regular season
November 3, 2025*; 7:00 pm, ESPN+		UNT Dallas	W 91–40	1–0	17 – Seamster	15 – Seamster	7 – Chavis	College Park Center (1,153); Arlington, TX
November 8, 2025*; 3:00 pm, MW Network		at New Mexico	L 56–74	1–1	17 – Seamster	9 – Seamster	1 – Tied	The Pit (11,513); Albuquerque, NM
November 10, 2025*; 7:00 pm, ESPN+		Arlington Baptist	W 117–61	2–1	19 – Seamster	9 – Rigsby Jr.	8 – Chavis	College Park Center (763); Arlington, TX
November 15, 2025*; 5:00 pm, ESPN+		Missouri State	W 67–49	3–1	17 – Seamster	15 – Jackson	8 – Chavis	College Park Center (2,934); Arlington, TX
November 18, 2025*; 7:00 pm, ESPN+		at Evansville	W 84-76	4–1	19 – Tied	9 – Seamster	4 – Tied	Ford Center (4,312); Evansville, IN
November 21, 2025*; 2:00 pm, ESPN+		vs. Campbell; Weber State MTE	L 67–71	4–2	16 – Seamster	8 – Jackson	8 – Chavis	Dee Events Center (307); Ogden, UT
November 22, 2025*; 8:00 pm, ESPN+		at Weber State; Weber State MTE	W 74–73	5–2	20 – McCreary	5 – Seamster	5 – Chavis	Dee Events Center (2,473); Ogden, UT
November 29, 2025*; 2:00 pm, ESPN+		Stephen F. Austin	W 66–61	6–2	16 – Tied	8 – McCreary	3 – Tied	College Park Center (1,275); Arlington, TX
December 2, 2025*; 7:00 pm, ESPN+		at Arkansas State	L 63–83	6–3	16 – McCreary	6 – Tied	2 – Chavis	First National Bank Arena (3,389); Jonesboro, AR
December 11, 2025*; 6:30 pm, ESPN+		at UT Rio Grande Valley	W 57–50	7–3	14 – McCreary	7 – Tied	5 – Lowery	UTRGV Fieldhouse (1,213); Edinburg, TX
December 17, 2025*; 9:00 pm, ACCNX		at Stanford	L 60–76	7–4	14 – Chavis	5 – Tied	4 – Chavis	Maples Pavilion (2,424); Stanford, CA
December 22, 2025*; 7:00 pm		at Oral Roberts	W 69–57	8–4	16 – McCreary	9 – Seamster	4 – Seamster	Mabee Center (4,755); Tulsa, OK
WAC regular season
December 29, 2025; 7:00 pm, ESPN+		Tarleton State	L 63–69	8–5 (0–1)	12 – McCreary	8 – Seamster	3 – Tied	College Park Center (1,482); Arlington, TX
January 1, 2026; 7:00 pm, ESPN+		California Baptist	W 63–51	9–5 (1–1)	14 – McCreary	6 – Tied	5 – Chavis	College Park Center (841); Arlington, TX
January 3, 2026; 7:30 pm, ESPN+		at Southern Utah	W 86–77	10–5 (2–1)	39 – McCreary	5 – Rigsby Jr.	5 – Seamster	America First Event Center (796); Cedar City, UT
January 10, 2026; 2:00 pm, ESPN+		Abilene Christian	W 82–72	11–5 (3–1)	20 – McCreary	6 – McCreary	3 – Laster	College Park Center (1,373); Arlington, TX
January 15, 2026; 8:00 pm, ESPN+		at Utah Tech	W 56–52	12–5 (4–1)	14 – Seamster	8 – Tied	3 – Chavis	Burns Arena (1,793); St. George, UT
January 17, 2026; 3:00 pm, ESPN+		at Utah Valley	L 74–86	12–6 (4–2)	20 – Chavis	5 – Tied	3 – Chavis	UCCU Center (2,517); Orem, UT
January 21, 2026; 7:00 pm, ESPN+		Tarleton State	W 71–64	13–6 (5–2)	23 – Seamster	8 – Seamster	7 – Chavis	College Park Center (1,457); Arlington, TX
January 29, 2026; 7:00 pm, ESPN+		Southern Utah	W 80–61	14–6 (6–2)	16 – Seamster	9 – Reed	4 – Tied	College Park Center (1,140); Arlington, TX
January 31, 2026; 2:00 pm, ESPN+		California Baptist	L 77–87 ^{OT}	14–7 (6–3)	19 – McCreary	7 – Tied	5 – Tied	College Park Center; Arlington, TX
February 5, 2026; 8:00 pm, ESPN+		at Utah Tech	L 84–87 ^{2OT}	14–8 (6–4)	25 – Seamster	10 – Seamster	5 – Seamster	Burns Arena (2,008); St. George, UT
February 7, 2026; 3:00 pm, ESPN+		at Utah Valley	L 60–81	14–9 (6–5)	20 – Mason	5 – Seamster	3 – Chavis	UCCU Center (2,245); Orem, UT
February 12, 2026; 8:00 pm, ESPNU/ESPN+		at Abilene Christian	L 63–67	14–10 (6–6)	20 – Chavis	9 – McCreary	4 – Chavis	Moody Coliseum (1,818); Abilene, TX
February 14, 2026; 2:00 pm, ESPN+		Southern Utah	L 73–78	14–11 (6–7)	16 – McCreary	5 – Seamster	5 – Chavis	College Park Center (1,152); Arlington, TX
February 19, 2026; 7:00 pm, ESPN+		Utah Tech	W 63–50	15–11 (7–7)	13 – McCreary	9 – Laster	4 – McCreary	College Park Center (1,466); Arlington, TX
February 21, 2026; 2:00 pm, ESPN+		Utah Valley	L 54–66	15–12 (7–8)	14 – McCreary	6 – Seamster	3 – Chavis	College Park Center (1,555); Arlington, TX
February 26, 2026; 9:00 pm, ESPN+		at California Baptist	L 56–68	15–13 (7–9)	15 – Chavis	6 – Tied	1 – Tied	Fowler Events Center (2,871); Riverside, CA
March 5, 2026; 7:00 pm, ESPN+		at Tarleton State	W 65–60	16–13 (8–9)	18 – Chavis	6 – Seamster	2 – Tied	EECU Center (2,143); Stephenville, TX
March 7, 2026; 6:00 pm, ESPN+		at Abilene Christian	W 64–57	17–13 (9–9)	16 – Chavis	9 – Mason	2 – Tied	Moody Coliseum (1,080); Abilene, TX
WAC tournament
March 12, 2026; 8:00 pm, ESPN+	(4)	vs. (5) Southern Utah; Quarterfinals	W 69–63	18–13	18 – McCreary	12 – Seamster	4 – Lowery	Orleans Arena (1,029); Paradise, NV
March 13, 2026; 8:00 pm, ESPN+	(4)	vs. (1) Utah Valley; Semifinals	L 65–67	18–14	18 – Laster	7 – Mason	2 – Chavis	Orleans Arena (1,474); Paradise, NV
*Non-conference game. ^{#}Rankings from AP Poll. (#) Tournament seedings in parentheses. All times are in Central.
