= 2025–26 Tarleton State Texans men's basketball team =

American college basketball season

2025–26 Tarleton State Texans men's basketball
- Conference: Western Athletic Conference
- Record: 14–18 (5–13 WAC)
- Head coach: Billy Gillispie (6th season)
- Associate head coach: Glynn Cyprien (acting head coach as of January 15)
- Assistant coaches: Joseph Jones; Jacob Hayslip; Ashton Arnold
- Home arena: EECU Center

2025–26 WAC men's basketball standings
	Conf.				Overall
Team	W		L	PCT	W		L	PCT
Utah Valley	14	–	4	.778	25	–	9	.735
California Baptist †	13	–	5	.722	25	–	9	.735
Utah Tech	11	–	7	.611	19	–	15	.559
UT Arlington	9	–	9	.500	18	–	14	.563
Southern Utah	6	–	12	.333	10	–	22	.313
Abilene Christian	5	–	13	.278	14	–	19	.424
Tarleton	5	–	13	.278	14	–	18	.438
† 2026 WAC tournament winner

The 2025–26 Tarleton State Texans men's basketball team represented Tarleton State University during the 2025–26 NCAA Division I men's basketball season. The Texans, led by sixth-year head coach Billy Gillispie, played their home games at the newly opened EECU Center in Stephenville, Texas as members of the Western Athletic Conference (WAC). They finished the season 14–18, 5–13 in WAC play to finish a tie for last place. As the No. 7 seed in the WAC tournament, they lost to Abilene Christian in the first round.

On February 27, 2026, the school announced that head coach Billy Gillispie would not return as head coach. On March 13, the school named Utah State assistant coach Eric Haut the team's new head coach.

Beginning in 2026, the WAC announced it will rebrand as the United Athletic Conference (UAC), with Tarleton remaining a member of the rebranded conference.

== Previous season ==
The Texans finished the 2024–25 season 12–20, 7–9 in WAC play, to finish in sixth place. They were defeated by California Baptist in the quarterfinals of the WAC tournament.

== Preseason ==
On October 28, 2025, the WAC released their preseason coaches poll. Tarleton State was picked to finish fifth in the conference.

=== Preseason rankings ===
WAC Preseason Poll
Place	Team	Points
1	California Baptist	33 (5)
2	Utah Valley	29 (1)
3	Abilene Christian	27
4	UT Arlington	22 (1)
5	Tarleton State	19
6	Utah Tech	9
7	Southern Utah	8
(#) first-place votes

=== Preseason All-WAC Team ===
No players were named to the Preseason All-WAC Team.

== Roster ==
2025–26 Tarleton State Texans men's basketball team
Players
Coaches

Pos.	#	Name	Height	Weight	Year	Previous school	Hometown
G	0	Jordan Mizell	6 ft 1 in (1.85 m)	170 lb (77 kg)	So	Plano East High School	Plano, Texas
F	1	AJ Dent Jr.	6 ft 5 in (1.96 m)	205 lb (93 kg)	Jr	Itawamba Community College	Thomasville, Georgia
G	2	Cam Thomas	6 ft 3 in (1.91 m)	190 lb (86 kg)	Fr	Mount Carmel High School	Chicago, Illinois
G	3	DJ Dormu	5 ft 9 in (1.75 m)	175 lb (79 kg)	So	Connors State	Washington, D.C.
G	4	Leroy Kelly IV	6 ft 2 in (1.88 m)	190 lb (86 kg)	Fr	Dynamic Prep	Dallas, Texas
G	5	Malek Archie	6 ft 2 in (1.88 m)	185 lb (84 kg)	RS Fr	McKinney High School	Chicago, Illinois
G	6	Kaia Isaac	6 ft 4 in (1.93 m)	215 lb (98 kg)	Sr	Canterbury Rams	Christchurch, New Zealand
G	7	Dior Johnson	6 ft 3 in (1.91 m)	185 lb (84 kg)	Jr	Clarendon College	Kingston, New York
G	8	Joseph Martinez	6 ft 3 in (1.91 m)	190 lb (86 kg)	So	Canutillo High School	El Paso, Texas
G	10	Damion Porter Jr.	6 ft 2 in (1.88 m)	205 lb (93 kg)	Fr	Romeoville High School	Chicago, Illinois
G	13	Kade Douglas	6 ft 0 in (1.83 m)	175 lb (79 kg)	Jr	Lancaster High School	Lancaster, Texas
G	14	Roy Marom	5 ft 8 in (1.73 m)	150 lb (68 kg)	So	Frisco Centennial High School	Frisco, Texas
F	22	Jaden Jinks	6 ft 8 in (2.03 m)	195 lb (88 kg)	Fr	Ridge Point High School	Missouri City, Texas
F	23	Chris Mpaka	6 ft 6 in (1.98 m)	225 lb (102 kg)	Sr	Indian Hills Community College	Kinshasa, Democratic Republic of the Congo
F	24	Ocypher Owens	6 ft 7 in (2.01 m)	215 lb (98 kg)	Sr	Indian River State	Orlando, Florida
F	25	Matyas Vrabel	6 ft 10 in (2.08 m)	220 lb (100 kg)	So	Davenport	Ostrava, Czech Republic
G	55	Cam McDowell	6 ft 5 in (1.96 m)	190 lb (86 kg)	Sr	Northwestern Oklahoma State	Griffin, Georgia
F	97	Andy Sigiscar	6 ft 9 in (2.06 m)	230 lb (104 kg)	RS Fr	Espoirs Cholet	Orléans, France

Head coach

- Billy Gillispie (Texas State)

Assistant coach(es)

- Glynn Cyprien (Southern–New Orleans)
- Joseph Jones (Texas A&M)
- Jacob Hayslip (Western Kentucky)
- Ashton Arnold (BYU)

Legend

- (C) Team captain
- (S) Suspended
- (I) Ineligible
- (W) Walk-on
- Injured
- Current redshirt

Roster
Last update: November 2, 2025

== Schedule and results ==
Date time, TV	Rank^{#}	Opponent^{#}	Result	Record	High points	High rebounds	High assists	Site (attendance) city, state
Exhibition
October 19, 2025*; 3:00 pm		TCU	L 54–88	–	17 – Johnson	5 – Dormu	3 – Isaac	EECU Center (3,309); Stephenville, TX
October 25, 2025*; 6:00 pm		East Texas A&M	W 61–50	–	18 – McDowell	9 – McDowell	4 – Tied	EECU Center (813); Stephenville, TX
Non-conference regular season
November 3, 2025*; 7:00 pm, ACCN		at SMU	L 76−96	0−1	23 – Johnson	6 – Mpaka	5 – Hicks	Moody Coliseum (4,626); University Park, TX
November 5, 2025*; 7:00 pm, SECN+		at LSU	L 60−96	0−2	19 – Douglas	5 – Tied	2 – Tied	Pete Maravich Assembly Center (6,252); Baton Rouge, LA
November 8, 2025*; 6:00 pm, ESPN+		Texas A&M–Corpus Christi	W 85−77	1−2	32 – Johnson	8 – Hicks	3 – Mizell	EECU Center (1,661); Stephenville, TX
November 11, 2025*; 7:00 pm, ESPN+		Merrimack	W 76−62	2−2	24 – Mpaka	9 – Mpaka	5 – Hicks	EECU Center (1,353); Stephenville, TX
November 14, 2025*; 8:00 pm, ESPN+		at Baylor	L 81–94	2–3	42 – Johnson	10 – Mpaka	5 – Mizell	Foster Pavilion (7,119); Waco, TX
November 17, 2025*; 7:00 pm, ESPN+		Angelo State	W 77−54	3−3	33 – Johnson	8 – Owens	5 – Mizell	EECU Center (1,123); Stephenville, TX
November 20, 2025*; 7:00 pm, ESPN+		at Rice	W 90–73	4–3	29 – Johnson	7 – Tied	6 – Tied	Tudor Fieldhouse (1,999); Houston, TX
November 28, 2025*; 4:00 pm, ESPN+		Midwestern State	W 67–57	5–3	14 – Mizell	8 – Hicks	3 – Douglas	EECU Center (1,358); Stephenville, TX
December 1, 2025*; 6:00 pm, ESPN+		at Cincinnati	L 58–76	5–4	16 – Owens	6 – Owens	4 – Owens	Fifth Third Arena (8,092); Cincinnati, OH
December 3, 2025*; 7:00 pm, ESPN+		Howard Payne	W 119–54	6–4	20 – McDowell	17 – Hicks	7 – Hicks	EECU Center (1,213); Stephenville, TX
December 7, 2025*; 4:30 pm, ESPN+		Cameron	W 93–63	7–4	26 – McDowell	13 – Hicks	4 – Hicks	EECU Center (1,351); Stephenville, TX
December 16, 2025*; 7:30 pm, SWAC TV		at Mississippi Valley State	W 88−64	8−4	27 – Johnson	8 – Kelly IV	6 – Isaac	Harrison HPER Complex (102); Itta Bena, MS
December 19, 2025*; 7:00 pm, ESPN+		Florida A&M	W 78–54	9–4	18 – Kelly IV	8 – Tied	8 – Mizell	EECU Center (811); Stephenville, TX
WAC regular season
December 29, 2025; 7:00 pm, ESPN+		at UT Arlington	W 69–63	10–4 (1–0)	23 – McDowell	6 – Mpaka	4 – Dormu	College Park Center (1,482); Arlington, TX
January 1, 2026; 7:00 pm, ESPN+		Utah Valley	L 85–91	10–5 (1–1)	36 – Johnson	10 – Hicks	3 – McDowell	EECU Center (987); Stephenville, TX
January 3, 2026; 4:00 pm, ESPN+		California Baptist	W 81–76 ^{OT}	11–5 (2–1)	34 – Johnson	8 – Hicks	2 – Tied	EECU Center (1,019); Stephenville, TX
January 8, 2026; 7:00 pm, ESPN+		Abilene Christian	L 80–84	11–6 (2–2)	33 – Johnson	7 – Mpaka	1 – Tied	EECU Center (1,567); Stephenville, TX
January 15, 2026; 7:30 pm, ESPN+		at Southern Utah	L 105–106 ^{OT}	11–7 (2–3)	40 – Johnson	6 – Mpaka	3 – Tied	America First Event Center (955); Cedar City, UT
January 17, 2026; 8:00 pm, ESPN+		at Utah Tech	L 71–75	11–8 (2–4)	25 – McDowell	7 – Mpaka	5 – McDowell	Burns Arena (1,540); St. George, UT
January 21, 2026; 7:00 pm, ESPN+		at UT Arlington	L 64–71	11–9 (2–5)	17 – McDowell	6 – Johnson	7 – Dormu	College Park Center (1,457); Arlington, TX
January 29, 2026; 7:00 pm, ESPN+		Utah Valley	L 55–83	11–10 (2–6)	13 – Isaac	6 – Owens	2 – Tied	EECU Center (2,267); Stephenville, TX
January 31, 2026; 4:00 pm, ESPN+		Utah Tech	L 59–65	11–11 (2–7)	16 – McDowell	10 – Mpaka	2 – Mizell	EECU Center (2,119); Stephenville, TX
February 5, 2026; 9:00 pm, ESPN+		at California Baptist	L 55–56	11–12 (2–8)	18 – Sigiscar	6 – Mizell	2 – Sigiscar	Fowler Events Center; Riverside, CA
February 7, 2026; 7:30 pm, ESPN+		at Southern Utah	W 62–59	12–12 (3–8)	14 – Tied	5 – Owens	2 – Tied	America First Event Center (853); Cedar City, UT
February 14, 2026; 3:00 pm, ESPN+		at Abilene Christian	L 59–73	12–13 (3–9)	13 – Douglas	3 – Tied	6 – Dormu	Moody Coliseum (1,196); Abilene, TX
February 16, 2026; 7:00 pm, ESPN+		Abilene Christian	W 65–62 ^{OT}	13–13 (4–9)	24 – Douglas	4 – Sigiscar	2 – Mizell	EECU Center (2,183); Stephenville, TX
February 19, 2026; 7:00 pm, ESPN+		Southern Utah	W 78–74	14–13 (5–9)	15 – Sigiscar	9 – Mpaka	2 – Owens	EECU Center (3,187); Stephenville, TX
February 21, 2026; 4:00 pm, ESPN+		Utah Tech	L 72–80	14–14 (5–10)	14 – Mizell	11 – Mizell	2 – Tied	EECU Center (1,502); Stephenville, TX
February 26, 2026; 7:00 pm, ESPN+		at Utah Valley	L 72–79	14–15 (5–11)	23 – Johnson	13 – Owens	4 – Tied	UCCU Center (2,355); Orem, UT
February 28, 2026; 8:00 pm, ESPN+		at California Baptist	L 67–82	14–16 (5–12)	24 – Johnson	7 – Mpaka	4 – Mizell	Fowler Events Center (4,294); Riverside, CA
March 5, 2026; 7:00 pm, ESPN+		UT Arlington	L 60–65	14–17 (5–13)	28 – Johnson	8 – Mpaka	4 – Mizell	EECU Center (2,143); Stephenville, TX
WAC tournament
March 11, 2026; 7:30 pm, ESPN+	(7)	vs. (6) Abilene Christian; First round	L 78–84	14–18	28 – Johnson	6 – Mpaka	3 – Tied	Orleans Arena (760); Paradise, NV
*Non-conference game. ^{#}Rankings from AP Poll. (#) Tournament seedings in parentheses. All times are in Central.
