= 2025–26 California Baptist Lancers men's basketball team =

American college basketball season

2025–26 California Baptist Lancers men's basketball

WAC tournament champions

NCAA tournament, First round
- Conference: Western Athletic Conference
- Record: 25–9 (13–5 WAC)
- Head coach: Rick Croy (13th season)
- Associate head coach: Hardy Asprilla
- Assistant coaches: Doc Wellman; Scott Clark; Dominic Lippi; Reginald Howard
- Home arena: Fowler Events Center

2025–26 WAC men's basketball standings
	Conf.				Overall
Team	W		L	PCT	W		L	PCT
Utah Valley	14	–	4	.778	25	–	9	.735
California Baptist †	13	–	5	.722	25	–	9	.735
Utah Tech	11	–	7	.611	19	–	15	.559
UT Arlington	9	–	9	.500	18	–	14	.563
Southern Utah	6	–	12	.333	10	–	22	.313
Abilene Christian	5	–	13	.278	14	–	19	.424
Tarleton	5	–	13	.278	14	–	18	.438
† 2026 WAC tournament winner

The 2025–26 California Baptist Lancers men's basketball team represented California Baptist University during the 2025–26 NCAA Division I men's basketball season. The Lancers, led by 13th-year head coach Rick Croy, played their home games at Fowler Events Center in Riverside, California, as members of the Western Athletic Conference (WAC).

This year marked the Lancers' last season as members of the WAC, as they will be joining the Big West Conference, effective July 1, 2026.

== Previous season ==
The Lancers finished the 2024–25 season 17–15, 9–7 in WAC play, to finish in third place. They defeated Tarleton State, before falling to eventual tournament champions Grand Canyon in the semifinal of the WAC tournament.

== Preseason ==
On October 28, 2025, the WAC released their preseason coaches poll. California Baptist was picked to finish atop the conference, while receiving five first-place votes.

=== Preseason rankings ===
WAC Preseason Poll
Place	Team	Points
1	California Baptist	33 (5)
2	Utah Valley	29 (1)
3	Abilene Christian	27
4	UT Arlington	22 (1)
5	Tarleton State	19
6	Utah Tech	9
7	Southern Utah	8
(#) first-place votes

=== WAC Preseason Player of the Year ===
WAC Preseason Player of the Year
Player	Year	Position
Dominique Daniels Jr.	Graduate Student	Guard

=== Preseason All-WAC Team ===
Preseason All-WAC Team
Player	Year	Position
Dominique Daniels Jr.	Graduate Student	Guard

== Roster ==
2025–26 California Baptist Lancers men's basketball team
Players
Coaches

Pos.	#	Name	Height	Weight	Year	Previous school	Hometown
G	1	Dominique Daniels Jr.	5 ft 10 in (1.78 m)	185 lb (84 kg)	GS	San Bernardino Valley College	Compton, California
G	2	Jalen Dollar	5 ft 10 in (1.78 m)	160 lb (73 kg)	So	Roosevelt High School	Seattle, Washington
G	3	Jayden Jackson	6 ft 4 in (1.93 m)	205 lb (93 kg)	GS	Northern Arizona	Milwaukee, Wisconsin
G	4	Chase Mayo Harmon	6 ft 4 in (1.93 m)	—	Sr	Regis	Peoria, Arizona
G	5	Miles Daniels	6 ft 2 in (1.88 m)	—	GS	Chico State	Pittsburg, California
F	6	Rene D'Amelio	6 ft 9 in (2.06 m)	—	Fr	Istituto Nasta	Borgomanero, Italy
F	7	Jonathan Griman	6 ft 11 in (2.11 m)	215 lb (98 kg)	Jr	NBA Academy	Caracas, Venezuela
G	10	Monty Bowser	6 ft 6 in (1.98 m)	205 lb (93 kg)	GS	Northern Arizona	Oakland, California
G	11	Jordan Muller	6 ft 0 in (1.83 m)	—	Fr	Pro Genius Ulm	Neu-Ulm, Germany
F	12	Devon Malcolm	6 ft 5 in (1.96 m)	220 lb (100 kg)	Sr	Yuba College	Medford, Oregon
F	15	Mouhamadou Dioum	6 ft 5 in (1.96 m)	195 lb (88 kg)	So	Saint-Chamond Basket	Dakar, Senegal
G	24	OJ Blankson	6 ft 7 in (2.01 m)	—	Fr	Acellus Academy	Burbank, California
F	25	Thomas Ndong	6 ft 10 in (2.08 m)	245 lb (111 kg)	Jr	Oregon State	Montreal, Quebec
G	33	Martel Williams	6 ft 3 in (1.91 m)	215 lb (98 kg)	Sr	Utah State Eastern	Las Vegas, Nevada
C	35	Nate Garcia	7 ft 0 in (2.13 m)	—	Fr	Damien High School	Glendora, California
F	42	Bradey Henige	7 ft 0 in (2.13 m)	240 lb (109 kg)	So	Cactus High School	Glendale, Arizona

Head coach

- Rick Croy (Azusa Pacific)

Assistant coach(es)

- Hardy Asprilla (Cal State Fullerton)
- Doc Wellman (Azusa Pacific)
- Scott Clark (Cal Poly Humboldt)
- Dominic Lippi (Whitman)
- Reginald Howard (UC Riverside)

Legend

- (C) Team captain
- (S) Suspended
- (I) Ineligible
- (W) Walk-on
- Injured
- Current redshirt

Roster
Last update: October 31, 2025

== Schedule and results ==
Date time, TV	Rank^{#}	Opponent^{#}	Result	Record	High points	High rebounds	High assists	Site (attendance) city, state
Non-conference regular season
November 3, 2025*; 7:30 pm, ESPN+		USC Upstate	W 87–75	1–0	23 – Daniels Jr.	8 – Jackson	5 – Jackson	Fowler Events Center (4,386); Riverside, CA
November 7, 2025*; 7:30 pm, ESPN+		at UC Irvine	W 69–61	2–0	17 – Williams	12 – Ndong	7 – Daniels Jr.	Bren Events Center (2,360); Irvine, CA
November 14, 2025*; 7:30 pm, ESPN+		Western Illinois	W 69–59	3–0	22 – Daniels Jr.	14 – Ndong	2 – Tied	Fowler Events Center (5,088); Riverside, CA
November 18, 2025*; 7:00 pm, ESPN+		UC Riverside; Acrisure Series on-campus game Crosstown Showdown	W 80–57	4–0	25 – Daniels	9 – Ndong	3 – Muller	Fowler Events Center (3,766); Riverside, CA
November 21, 2025*; 7:00 pm, ESPN+		Grambling State; Acrisure Series on-campus game	W 72–59	5–0	17 – Williams	7 – Jackson	4 – Jackson	Fowler Events Center (2,617); Riverside, CA
November 25, 2025*; 3:30 pm, CBSSN		vs. San Diego; Acrisure Series	W 76–61	6–0	22 – Muller	10 – Griman	3 – Muller	Acrisure Arena; Thousand Palms, CA
November 29, 2025*; 7:00 pm, ESPN+		at Oregon State	W 75–69	7–0	19 – Williams	8 – Henige	7 – Daniels Jr.	Gill Coliseum (2,130); Corvallis, OR
December 1, 2025*; 6:00 pm, ESPN+		at Colorado	L 70–78	7–1	25 – Daniels Jr.	7 – Henige	4 – Muller	CU Events Center (4,931); Boulder, CO
December 3, 2025*; 6:00 pm, ESPN+		vs. No. 9 BYU; Delta Center Series	L 60–91	7–2	12 – Williams	5 – Williams	5 – Williams	Delta Center (9,189); Salt Lake City, UT
December 6, 2025*; 5:00 pm, ESPN+		at Utah	L 85–91	7–3	31 – Daniels Jr.	11 – Tied	4 – Ndong	Jon M. Huntsman Center (6,077); Salt Lake City, UT
December 12, 2025*; 6:00 pm, ESPN+		at Eastern Washington	W 88–83	8–3	34 – Daniels Jr.	8 – D'Amelio	7 – Muller	Reese Court (1,167); Cheney, WA
December 16, 2025*; 7:00 pm, ESPN+		Southern	W 75−67	9−3	30 – Daniels Jr.	11 – Ndong	6 – Daniels Jr.	Fowler Events Center (2,425); Riverside, CA
December 20, 2025*; 5:00 pm, ESPN+		Sacramento State	W 74–67	10–3	14 – Williams	17 – Ndong	4 – Williams	Fowler Events Center (3,601); Riverside, CA
WAC regular season
December 29, 2025; 5:00 pm, ESPN+		at Utah Valley	L 66–73	10–4 (0–1)	17 – Daniels Jr.	8 – Ndong	4 – Muller	UCCU Center (2,171); Orem, UT
January 1, 2026; 12:00 pm, ESPN+		at UT Arlington	L 51–63	10–5 (0–2)	25 – Daniels Jr.	6 – Malcolm	1 – Tied	College Park Center (841); Arlington, TX
January 3, 2026; 2:00 pm, ESPN+		at Tarleton State	L 76–81 ^{OT}	10–6 (0–3)	25 – Daniels Jr.	8 – Tied	4 – Tied	EECU Center (1,019); Stephenville, TX
January 8, 2026; 7:00 pm, ESPN+		Utah Tech	W 84–72	11–6 (1–3)	20 – Tied	7 – Griman	4 – Tied	Fowler Events Center (2,012); Riverside, CA
January 10, 2026; 5:00 pm, ESPN+		Southern Utah	W 58–55	12–6 (2–3)	20 – Daniels Jr.	11 – Ndong	3 – Daniels Jr.	Fowler Events Center (3,438); Riverside, CA
January 15, 2026; 5:00 pm, ESPN+		at Abilene Christian	W 74–58	13–6 (3–3)	23 – Williams	9 – Ndong	4 – Jackson	Moody Coliseum (1,229); Abilene, TX
January 21, 2026; 7:00 pm, ESPN+		Utah Tech	W 73–64	14–6 (4–3)	26 – Daniels Jr.	7 – Ndong	5 – Daniels Jr.	Fowler Events Center (2,264); Riverside, CA
January 24, 2026; 5:00 pm, ESPN+		Utah Valley	W 78–71 ^{OT}	15–6 (5–3)	47 – Daniels Jr.	10 – Ndong	1 – Tied	Fowler Events Center (3,907); Riverside, CA
January 31, 2026; 12:00 pm, ESPN+		at UT Arlington	W 87–77 ^{OT}	16–6 (6–3)	28 – Daniels Jr.	9 – Griman	6 – Daniels Jr.	College Park Center (1,140); Arlington, TX
February 5, 2026; 7:00 pm, ESPN+		Tarleton State	W 56–55	17–6 (7–3)	15 – Williams	13 – Henige	3 – Daniels Jr.	Fowler Events Center (3,052); Riverside, CA
February 7, 2026; 5:00 pm, ESPN+		Abilene Christian	W 65–63	18–6 (8–3)	21 – Daniels Jr.	8 – Ndong	5 – Daniels Jr.	Fowler Events Center (3,079); Riverside, CA
February 12, 2026; 5:30 pm, ESPN+		at Southern Utah	W 83–66	19–6 (9–3)	32 – Daniels Jr.	11 – Williams	3 – Tied	America First Event Center (771); Cedar City, UT
February 14, 2026; 6:00 pm, ESPN+		at Utah Tech	L 65–70	19–7 (9–4)	29 – Daniels Jr.	15 – Griman	3 – Williams	Burns Arena (1,943); St. George, UT
February 19, 2026; 5:00 pm, ESPN+		at Utah Valley	L 46–65	19–8 (9–5)	12 – Daniels Jr.	8 – Henige	4 – Muller	UCCU Center (2,364); Orem, UT
February 26, 2026; 7:00 pm, ESPN+		UT Arlington	W 68–56	20–8 (10–5)	28 – Daniels Jr.	7 – Griman	4 – Daniels Jr.	Fowler Events Center (2,871); Riverside, CA
February 28, 2026; 6:00 pm, ESPN+		Tarleton State	W 82–67	21–8 (11–5)	23 – Daniels Jr.	10 – Griman	4 – Daniels Jr.	Fowler Events Center (4,294); Riverside, CA
March 5, 2026; 7:00 pm, ESPN+		Abilene Christian	W 87–48	22–8 (12–5)	22 – Daniels Jr.	6 – Ndong	4 – Daniels Jr.	Fowler Events Center (4,681); Riverside, CA
March 7, 2026; 5:30 pm, ESPN+		at Southern Utah	W 82–75	23–8 (13–5)	32 – Daniels Jr.	10 – Griman	3 – Tied	America First Event Center (602); Cedar City, UT
WAC tournament
March 13, 2026; 8:30 pm, ESPN+	(2)	vs. (3) Utah Tech; Semifinal	W 86–72	24–8	41 – Daniels Jr.	7 – Ndong	3 – Jackson	Orleans Arena (1,474); Las Vegas, NV
March 14, 2026; 9:00 pm, ESPN2	(2)	vs. (1) Utah Valley; Championship	W 63–61	25–8	23 – Daniels Jr.	8 – Ndong	3 – Tied	Orleans Arena; Las Vegas, NV
NCAA tournament
March 20, 2026; 6:45 p.m., CBS	(13 E)	vs. (4 E) No. 17 Kansas; First round	L 60–68	25–9	25 – Daniels Jr.	7 – Tied	3 – Daniels Jr.	Viejas Arena (11,441); San Diego, CA
*Non-conference game. ^{#}Rankings from AP Poll. (#) Tournament seedings in parentheses. E=East. All times are in Pacific.
