= K. T. Turner =

American basketball player and coach

Current position
- Title: Head coach
- Team: UT Arlington
- Conference: WAC
- Record: 51–46 (.526)

Biographical details
- Born: August 23, 1978 (age 48); Manhattan, Kansas, U.S.
- Education: Oklahoma City

Playing career
- 1997–1999: Hutchinson
- 2001–2002: Oklahoma City

Coaching career (HC unless noted)
- 2005–2006: Panola (assistant)
- 2006–2007: Redlands (assistant)
- 2008–2009: Cowley (assistant)
- 2009–2011: Hutchinson Community College (assistant)
- 2011–2012: Texas A&M–Corpus Christi (assistant)
- 2012–2013: Wichita State (assistant)
- 2013–2016: SMU (assistant)
- 2016–2020: SMU (associate HC)
- 2020–2021: Texas (associate HC)
- 2021–2022: Oklahoma (associate HC)
- 2022–2023: Kentucky (assistant)
- 2023–present: UT Arlington

Head coaching record
- Overall: 51–46 (.526) (college)

K. T. Turner (born August 23, 1978) is an American basketball coach who is currently the head coach of the UT Arlington Mavericks men's basketball team.

== Playing career ==
Tuner played two seasons at Hutchinson Community College under Tim Jankovich before completing his playing career at Oklahoma City. He briefly played professionally in Italy.

== Coaching career ==
Beginning his coaching career in the junior college ranks, Turner had assistant coaching stints at Panola College, Redlands Community College, Cowley College, and Hutchinson before landing on Willis Wilson's staff at Texas A&M-Corpus Christi. Turner would move on to Wichita State for two seasons before joining Larry Brown's staff at SMU. He'd continue on staff when his former junior college head coach Tim Jankovich took over as head coach, being elevated to associate head coach in 2016. From 2020 to 2023, Turner would be an assistant coach on the staffs at Texas, Oklahoma, and Kentucky.

On March 17, 2023, Turner was named the Head Coach at UT Arlington.

== Head coaching record ==
Record table
Season	Team	Overall	Conference	Standing	Postseason
UT Arlington Mavericks (WAC) (2023–present)
2023–24	UT Arlington	20–14	13–7	3rd	
2024–25	UT Arlington	13–18	6–10	7th	
2025–26	UT Arlington	18–14	9–9	4th	
UT Arlington:		51–46 (.526)	28–26 (.519)		
Total:		51–46 (.526)			
National champion Postseason invitational champion Conference regular season champion Conference regular season and conference tournament champion Division regular season champion Division regular season and conference tournament champion Conference tournament champion
