= Brette Tanner =

American basketball coach

Current position
- Title: Head coach
- Team: Abilene Christian
- Conference: WAC
- Record: 84–81 (.509)

Biographical details
- Born: November 7, 1975 (age 50)

Playing career
- 1994–1996: Allen County CC
- 1996–1998: Emporia State

Coaching career (HC unless noted)
- 1998–2000: Fort Scott CC (assistant)
- 2000–2004: Fort Scott CC
- 2004–2006: South Plains JC (assistant)
- 2006–2008: Stephen F. Austin (assistant)
- 2008–2013: Stephen F. Austin (associate HC)
- 2013–2014: Abilene Christian (assistant)
- 2014–2021: Abilene Christian (associate HC)
- 2021–present: Abilene Christian

Head coaching record
- Overall: 84–81 (.509) (NCAA)
- Tournaments: 2–1 (CBI); 1–1 (CIT)

Brette Tanner (born November 7, 1975) is an American basketball coach who is currently the head coach of the Abilene Christian Wildcats, a position he has held since 2021. He played collegiately at Emporia State from 1996 to 1998. Tanner served as an assistant coach at Stephen F. Austin. He was hired as an assistant coach at Abilene Christian in 2013, as the school transitioned to Division I.

== Head coaching record ==
Record table
Season	Coach	Overall	Conference	Standing	Postseason
Abilene Christian Wildcats (Western Athletic Conference) (2021–present)
2021–22	Abilene Christian	25–11	11–7	6th	CBI Semifinals
2022–23	Abilene Christian	13–17	7–11	9th	
2023–24	Abilene Christian	16–18	10–10	T–6th	CIT Quarterfinals
2024–25	Abilene Christian	16–16	8–8	T–4th	
2025–26	Abilene Christian	14–19	5–13	T–6th	
2026–27	Abilene Christian	0–0	0–0		
Abilene Christian:		84–81 (.509)	41–49 (.456)		
Total:		84–81 (.509)			
National champion Postseason invitational champion Conference regular season champion Conference regular season and conference tournament champion Division regular season champion Division regular season and conference tournament champion Conference tournament champion
