= Jon Judkins =

American basketball player and coach

Current position
- Title: Head coach
- Team: Utah Tech
- Conference: Big Sky
- Record: 345–209 (.623)

Biographical details
- Born: March 5, 1964 (age 62); Salt Lake City, Utah, U.S.

Playing career
- 1983–1984: Dixie State
- 1985–1988: Utah State

Coaching career (HC unless noted)
- 1988–1993: Snow College (assistant)
- 1993–2005: Snow College
- 2005–present: Utah Tech

Head coaching record
- Overall: 345–209 (.623) (NCAA); 284–128 (.689) (NJCAA)
- Tournaments: 2–8 (NCAA Division II)

Accomplishments and honors

Championships
- 6 Pacific West Conference Regular Season (2010, 2011, 2012, 2013, 2015, 2018); 2 Pacific West Conference Tournament (2013, 2018); Rocky Mountain Athletic Conference Regular Season (2020)

Awards
- WAC Coach of the Year (2026)

Jon Judkins (born March 3, 1964) is an American basketball coach who is the current head coach of the Utah Tech Trailblazers men's basketball team.

== Playing career ==
After a season at Dixie College (now Utah Tech University), Judkins transferred to Utah State where he was the first Aggie to post a triple-double, and was part of the team's 1988 NCAA tournament bid.

== Coaching career ==
After graduation, Judkins joined the coaching staff at Snow College, where he was an assistant until 1993, when he was elevated to head coach. Over the next 12 seasons, he posted a 284–128 record before joining Utah Tech in 2005, guiding the team through its transition from junior college to NCAA status, first in Division II and in 2020, Division I as the Trailblazers join the Western Athletic Conference.

Overall, Judkins has guided Utah Tech to 11-straight winning seasons, six Pacific West Conference championships, and eight NCAA Division II Tournament appearances.

== Personal ==
Judkins' brother, Jeff, is a former National Basketball Association (NBA) player and former head coach of the BYU Cougars women's basketball team.

== Head coaching record ==
Record table
Season	Team	Overall	Conference	Standing	Postseason
Snow College Badgers (NJCAA) (1992–2005)
Snow College:		284–128 (.689)			
Dixie State Rebels (NJCAA) (2005–2006)
2005–06	Dixie State	20–12			
Dixie State Rebels – Red Storm – Trailblazers (Pacific West Conference) (2006–2019)
2006–07	Dixie State	11–13	0–0	7th	
2007–08	Dixie State	13–14	10–8	3rd	
2008–09	Dixie State	16–11	8–4	2nd	
2009–10	Dixie State	20–6	14–2	T–1st	NCAA Division II First Round
2010–11	Dixie State	22–7	13–3	T–1st	NCAA Division II Regional Final
2011–12	Dixie State	20–7	15–3	T–1st	NCAA Division II First Round
2012–13	Dixie State	22–7	15–3	1st	NCAA Division II First Round
2013–14	Dixie State	21–7	15–5	2nd	NCAA Division II First Round
2014–15	Dixie State	19–8	17–3	T–1st	NCAA Division II First Round
2015–16	Dixie State	18–9	15–5	4th	
2016–17	Dixie State	19–9	16–4	3rd	NCAA Division II First Round
2017–18	Dixie State	23–7	18–2	1st	NCAA Division II First Round
Dixie State Trailblazers (Rocky Mountain Athletic Conference) (2018–2020)
2018–19	Dixie State	18–9	16–6	2nd	
2019–20	Dixie State	23–7	17–5	1st	
Dixie State/Utah Tech Trailblazers (Western Athletic Conference) (2020–2026)
2020–21	Dixie State	8–13	4–10	8th	
2021–22	Dixie State	13–18	6–12	10th	
2022–23	Utah Tech	14–19	5–13	12th	
2023–24	Utah Tech	11–20	7–13	9th	
2024–25	Utah Tech	7–26	2–14	9th	
2025–26	Utah Tech	19–15	11–7	3rd	
Utah Tech Trailblazers (Big Sky Conference) (2026–present)
2026–27	Utah Tech	0–0	0–0		
Dixie State/Utah Tech:		345–209 (.623)	230–106 (.685)		
Total:		345–209 (.623)			
National champion Postseason invitational champion Conference regular season champion Conference regular season and conference tournament champion Division regular season champion Division regular season and conference tournament champion Conference tournament champion
