= Utah Tech Trailblazers men's basketball =

Utah Tech Trailblazers
2026–27 Utah Tech Trailblazers men's basketball team
- University: Utah Tech University
- First season: 2006–07 (NCAA)
- Head coach: Jon Judkins (22nd season)
- Location: St. George, Utah
- Arena: Burns Arena (capacity: 4,779)
- Conference: Big Sky
- Nickname: Trailblazers
- Colors: Red, navy blue, and white

NCAA Division II tournament Sweet Sixteen
- 2011

NCAA Division II tournament appearances
- 2010, 2011, 2012, 2013, 2014, 2015, 2017, 2018, 2020

Conference tournament champions
- Pacific West: 2013, 2018

The Utah Tech Trailblazers men's basketball team represents Utah Tech University (formerly known as Dixie State), in St. George, Utah as a member of NCAA Division I and the Big Sky Conference. Previously, the school's program participated in the Rocky Mountain Athletic Conference (RMAC), at the NCAA Division II level.

The Trailblazers are currently led by seventeenth-year head coach Jon Judkins.

The team plays its games at the Burns Arena on its campus in St. George.

In 2022, the university changed its name from Dixie State University to Utah Tech University. The name change was made in mid-May, ahead of the legal change on July 1. The "Trailblazers" nickname was not affected.

== Postseason results ==
=== NJCAA results ===
Dixie College, as the school was then known, experienced tremendous success as a junior college. In 1985, Dixie won its first national title, defeating Kankakee Community College, 57–55. National player of the year Averian Parrish and Brent Stephenson were the leading players on the 35–1 team coached by Neil Roberts. In 2012, the 1984–85 team was inducted into the school's Hall of Fame. Parrish and Roberts have been both been inducted into the school's Hall of Fame.

Dixie went to the Final Four in 2001 behind the play of future NBA player Marcus Banks. The following year, Dixie won its second national title behind the play of Jaime Lloreda. Jeff Kidder was the head coach for Dixie's second title run.

Dixie transitioned to Division II in 2007.

=== NCAA Division II tournament results ===
Dixie State enjoyed its best run in Division II when led by Tom Whitehead, a two-time first All-Pace West selection. Whitehead, teamed with players like Jeremiah Barnes, Zach Robbins, and Andy Palmer, led Dixie to a share of the 2010 Pac-West title and their first tournament berth. The following season, the Red Storm, as they were then called, were even better. Seeded as No. 4 in the West, they made it to the Sweet 16. Barnes scored 22 points to lift to Dixie their first-ever tournament win over Chaminade. Whitehead had 17 as Dixie beat top-seeded Seattle Pacific. Dixie lost a close game to rival BYU-Hawaii in the Sweet 16.

The Trailblazers appeared in nine NCAA Division II Tournaments. Their combined record is 2–8.

Year	Round	Opponent	Result
2010	First Round	Cal Poly Pomona	L 62–71
2011	First Round; Second Round; Regional Finals	Chaminade; Seattle Pacific; BYU Hawaii	W 92–81; W 75–73; L 73–79
2012	First Round	Seattle Pacific	L 68–70
2013	First Round	CSU San Bernardino	L 69–75
2014	First Round	Cal Poly Pomona	L 63–73
2015	First Round	Cal Poly Pomona	L 60–62
2017	First Round	UC San Diego	L 68–94
2018	First Round	Azusa Pacific	L 65–69
2020	First Round	Colorado Mines	Cancelled
