= Rick Croy =

American basketball player and coach

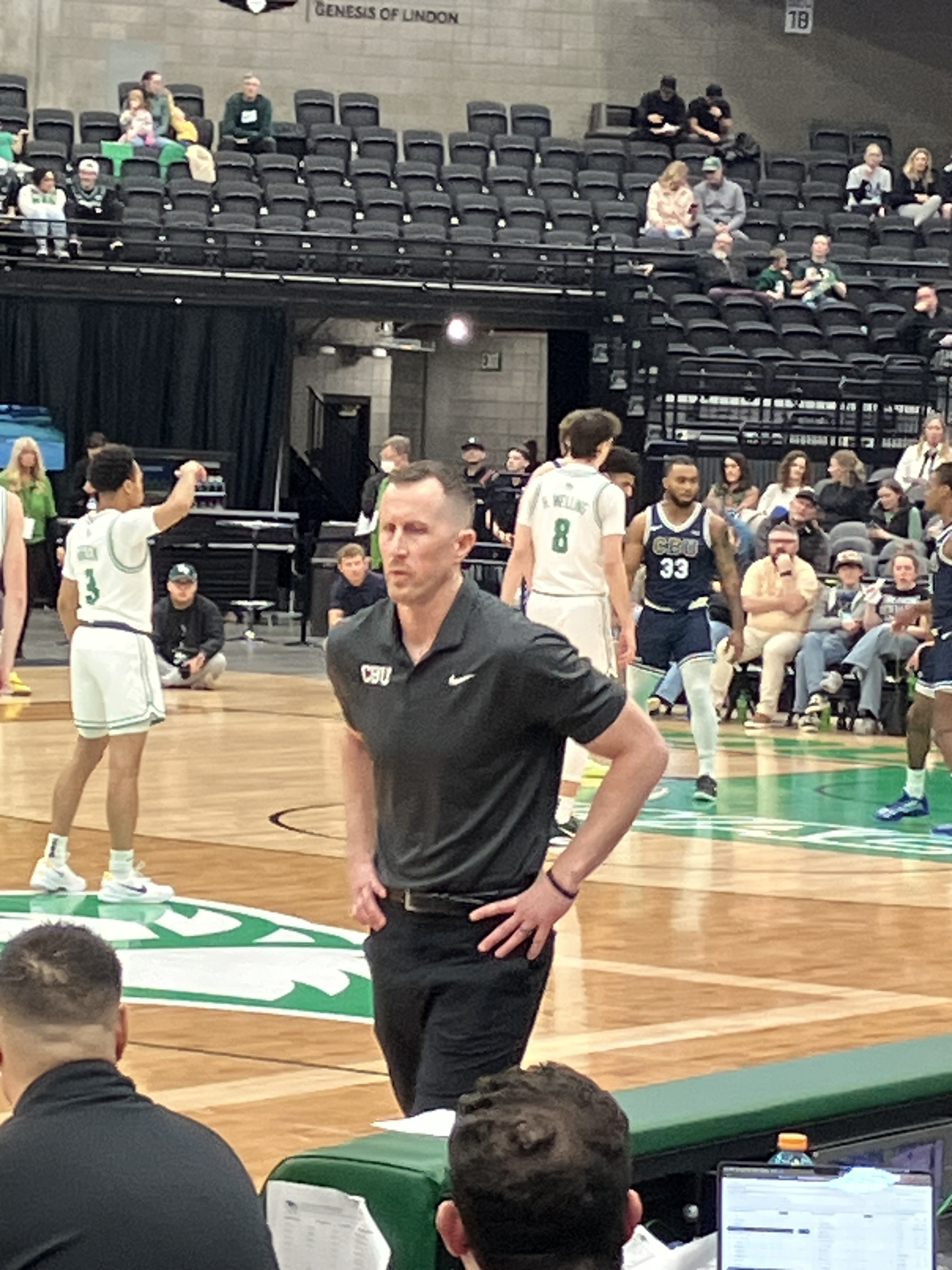
- Croy in 2025

Current position
- Title: Associate head coach
- Team: Arizona State
- Conference: Big 12

Biographical details
- Born: July 19, 1977 (age 49); San Diego County, California, U.S.

Playing career
- 1996–1999: San Francisco State

Coaching career (HC unless noted)
- 1999–2001: UC Riverside (Asst.)
- 2001–2002: Concordia Irvine (Asst.)
- 2002–2005: UC Riverside (Asst.)
- 2005–2010: Citrus College
- 2010–2013: St. Mary's (Assoc. HC)
- 2013–2026: California Baptist
- 2026–present: Arizona State (Assoc. HC)

Head coaching record
- Overall: 130–35 (.788) (junior college); 275–137 (.667) (college)
- Tournaments: 0–1 (NCAA Division I); 7–4 (NCAA Division II); 0–2 (CBI)

Richard K. Croy (born July 19, 1977) is an American college basketball coach who is the current associate head coach of the Arizona State Sun Devils men's basketball team. Croy has been a basketball coach since 1999 and has held his current position at Arizona State since 2026.

Croy grew up in Walnut Creek, California and played college basketball at San Francisco State. He began his basketball coaching career as an assistant at UC Riverside and Concordia University Irvine. His first head coaching position was at the junior college level at Citrus College from 2005 to 2010. Under Croy, Citrus won 130 games, three conference titles, and a California state championship.

At California Baptist, Croy led the Lancers to five straight NCAA Division II Tournament appearances from 2014 to 2018 and two Pacific West Conference titles. In 2018, California Baptist moved to Division I as a member of the Western Athletic Conference; Croy led California Baptist to an appearance in the 2019 College Basketball Invitational, and in 2019-20 went 21-10 culminating with the record for most wins in the first two years of the Division I transition, and led California Baptist to winning records in its first five Division I seasons.

== Playing career ==
Croy attended Northgate High School in Walnut Creek, California where he was a part of the 1995 CIF State Championship team. In college, Croy holds the school record for three-point field goals, is second all-time in games played, and eighth all-time in scoring at San Francisco State where he graduated in 1999.

== Coaching career ==
After graduation, Croy began his coaching career in 1999 as an assistant coach at UC Riverside for two seasons before moving on to Concordia for another season. He made his return as an assistant coach with the Highlanders in 2002 becoming the youngest head assistant in the Country, he stayed from 2002 to 2005 before accepting the head coaching position at CCCAA institution Citrus College. While at Citrus, he led the Owls to three-straight Western State Conference South titles, the 2008 California State Championship and the 2010 California Community College Athletic Association Final Four. He was also named a three-time WSC Coach of the Year. During this five years at Citrus, Croy compiled a 130–35 record, which is second all-time in school history for total wins, and first all-time in winning percentage.

In 2010, Croy joined Randy Bennett's staff at St. Mary's, where he stayed until 2013 before becoming the 12th head men's basketball coach in California Baptist history on April 2, 2013. Since joining the Lancers, Croy guided the team to the NCAA Division II men's basketball tournament every season before its transition to NCAA Division I and the Western Athletic Conference for the 2018–19 season.

On March 30, 2026, Croy was hired by Randy Bennett, his former lead coach at Saint Mary's, to join his Arizona State coaching staff as associate head coach.

== Head coaching record ==
=== Junior college ===
Record table
Season	Team	Overall	Conference	Standing	Postseason
Citrus Owls (Western State Conference) (2005–2010)
2005–06	Citrus	17–13	5–7	4th(South)	
2006–07	Citrus	21–13	7–5	3rd(South)	CCCAA State Playoffs Second Round
2007–08	Citrus	35–1	12–0	1st(South)	CCCAA State Champion
2008–09	Citrus	28–5	11–1	1st(South)	CCCAA State Regional Finals
2009–10	Citrus	29–3	12–0	1st(South)	CCCAA State Final Four
Citrus:		130–35 (.788)	47–13 (.783)		
Total:		130–35 (.788)			
National champion Postseason invitational champion Conference regular season champion Conference regular season and conference tournament champion Division regular season champion Division regular season and conference tournament champion Conference tournament champion

=== College ===
Record table
Season	Team	Overall	Conference	Standing	Postseason
California Baptist Lancers (Pacific West Conference) (2013–2018)
2013–14	California Baptist	24–4	18–2	1st	NCAA Division II First Round
2014–15	California Baptist	26–7	16–4	3rd	NCAA Division II Sweet 16
2015–16	California Baptist	28–7	15–5	T–1st	NCAA Division II Second Round
2016–17	California Baptist	26–5	17–3	2nd	NCAA Division II Second Round
2017–18	California Baptist	28–6	17–3	2nd	NCAA Division II Elite Eight
California Baptist (PacWest):		132–29 (.820)	83–17 (.830)		
California Baptist Lancers (Western Athletic Conference) (2018–2026)
2018–19	California Baptist	16–15	7–9	T–5th	CBI first round
2019–20	California Baptist	21–10	10–6	2nd	
2020–21	California Baptist	13–10	6–6	4th	
2021–22	California Baptist	18–16	7–11	9th	CBI first round
2022–23	California Baptist	17–16	8–10	8th	
2023–24	California Baptist	16–17	8–12	8th	
2024–25	California Baptist	17–15	9–7	3rd	
2025–26	California Baptist	25–9	13–5	2nd	NCAA Division I Round of 64
California Baptist (WAC):		143–108 (.570)	68–66 (.507)		
Total:		275–137 (.667)	151–86 (.637)		
National champion Postseason invitational champion Conference regular season champion Conference regular season and conference tournament champion Division regular season champion Division regular season and conference tournament champion Conference tournament champion
