= 2025–26 UNLV Runnin' Rebels basketball team =

American college basketball season

2025–26 UNLV Runnin' Rebels basketball

NIT, Second Round
- Conference: Mountain West Conference
- Record: 18–17 (11–9 MW)
- Head coach: Josh Pastner (1st season)
- Associate head coach: Scott Garson (1st season)
- Assistant coaches: Anthony Wilkins (1st season); Justin Hawkins (1st season)
- Home arena: Thomas & Mack Center (Capacity: 17,923)

2025–26 Mountain West Conference men's basketball standings
	Conf.				Overall
Team	W		L	PCT	W		L	PCT
Utah State †	15	–	5	.750	29	–	7	.806
San Diego State	14	–	6	.700	22	–	11	.667
New Mexico	13	–	7	.650	26	–	11	.703
Grand Canyon	13	–	7	.650	20	–	12	.625
Nevada	12	–	8	.600	24	–	13	.649
Boise State	12	–	8	.600	20	–	12	.625
Colorado State	11	–	9	.550	21	–	13	.618
UNLV	11	–	9	.550	18	–	17	.514
Wyoming	9	–	11	.450	18	–	15	.545
Fresno State	7	–	13	.350	13	–	19	.406
San Jose State	3	–	17	.150	9	–	24	.273
Air Force	0	–	20	.000	3	–	29	.094
† 2026 Mountain West tournament winner

The 2025–26 UNLV Runnin' Rebels basketball team represented the University of Nevada, Las Vegas during the 2025–26 NCAA Division I men's basketball season. The Runnin' Rebels, led by first-year head coach Josh Pastner, played their home games at the Thomas & Mack Center in Paradise, Nevada as a member of the Mountain West Conference.

== Previous season ==
The Runnin' Rebels finished the 2024–25 season 18–15, 11–9 in Mountain West play to finish sixth in the conference. As the 6-seed in the Mountain West Tournament they would defeat 11-seed Air Force in the First Round before falling to 3-seed Utah State in the Quarterfinals 58–70 to end the year. Two days following the conclusion of the season, Kevin Kruger was relieved of his duties as head coach after four seasons.

== Offseason ==
=== Departures ===
Name	Number	Pos.	Height	Weight	Year	Hometown	Reason for departure
Isaiah Cottrell	0	F	6'11"	245	(redshirt) Junior	Las Vegas, NV	Transferred to Southern Utah
Jalen Hill	1	F	6'6"	230	Graduate	Las Vegas, NV	Out of eligibility
James Evans Jr.	2	G	6'4"	190	Freshman	Wichita, KS	Transferred to Cal State Northridge
Luke Naser	3	G	6'0"	200	Freshman	Las Vegas, NV	Transferred to Xavier
Rob Whaley Jr.	5	F	6'7"	260	Senior	Farmington, UT	Transferred to Kent State
Jaden Henley	10	G	6'7"	215	Junior	Ontario, CA	Transferred to Grand Canyon
Dedan Thomas Jr.	11	G	6'1"	170	Sophomore	Las Vegas, NV	Transferred to LSU
Brooklyn Hicks	13	G	6'3"	185	Sophomore	Seattle, WA	Transferred to Montana
Jailen Bedford	14	G	6'4"	180	Senior	Austin, TX	Transferred to Virginia Tech
Jace Whiting	15	G	6'3"	190	Junior	Burley, ID	Transferred to Weber State
Julian Rishwain	20	G	6'5"	200	Graduate	Los Angeles, CA	Out of eligibility
Pape N'Diaye	22	F	7'0"	215	Freshman	Ivory Coast	Transferred to Xavier
Faris Mucharbach	31	G	6'9"	200	Freshman	Las Vegas, NV	Departed program
Jeremiah Cherry	45	G	6'11"	280	Junior	San Diego, CA	Transferred to Sacramento State

=== Incoming transfers ===
Name	Number	Pos.	Height	Weight	Year	Hometown	Previous college
Dravyn Gibbs-Lawhorn	0	G	6'1"	185	Junior	Lafayette, IN	Illinois
Ladji Dembele	1	F	6'8"	255	Junior	Newark, NJ	Iowa
Kimani Hamilton	2	F	6'8"	225	Senior	Jackson, MS	High Point
Howie Fleming Jr.	3	G	6'5"	237	(redshirt) Senior	Louisville, KY	UTRGV
Al Green	7	G	6'3"	185	Senior	Sacramento, CA	Louisiana Tech
Jalen Cunningham	13	F	6'2"	185	(redshirt) Sophomore	Las Vegas, NV	Cabrillo College
Naas Cunningham	24	F	6'7"	175	(redshirt) Freshman	West Orange, NJ	Alabama
Emmanuel Stephen	34	C	7'0"	230	Sophomore	Lagos, Nigeria	Arizona
Myles Che	77	G	6'3"	190	Junior	Walnut, CA	UC Irvine

=== 2025 recruiting class ===
College recruiting information
Name	Hometown	School	Height	Weight	Commit date
Mason Abittan; SG	Henderson, NV	Coronado HS	6 ft 6 in (1.98 m)	185 lb (84 kg)	Nov 14, 2024
Mason Abittan; SG	Recruit ratings: Scout: Rivals: 247Sports: ESPN: (NR)				
Walter Brown; C	Leithfield, New Zealand	Canterbury Rams (NZ)	6 ft 5 in (1.96 m)	210 lb (95 kg)	Aug 8, 2025
Walter Brown; C	Recruit ratings: Scout: Rivals: 247Sports: ESPN: (NR)				
Tyrin Jones; SF	Layton, UT	Layton Christian Academy	6 ft 8 in (2.03 m)	190 lb (86 kg)	Nov 14, 2024
Tyrin Jones; SF	Recruit ratings: Scout: Rivals: 247Sports: ESPN: (NR)				
Issac Williamson; CG	Eastvale, CA	Eleanor Roosevelt HS	6 ft 0 in (1.83 m)	165 lb (75 kg)	Apr 15, 2025
Issac Williamson; CG	Recruit ratings: Scout: Rivals: 247Sports: ESPN: (NR)				
Overall recruit ranking: Scout: – Rivals: –
Note: In many cases, Scout, Rivals, 247Sports, On3, and ESPN may conflict in their listings of height and weight.; In these cases, the average was taken. ESPN grades are on a 100-point scale.; Sources: "2025 UNLV Basketball Recruiting Commits". Scout.; "Scout.com Team Recruiting Rankings". Scout.; "2025 Team Ranking". Rivals.

== Roster ==
2025–26 UNLV Runnin' Rebels men's basketball team
Players
Coaches

Pos.	#	Name	Height	Weight	Year	Previous school	Hometown
G	0	Dravyn Gibbs-Lawhorn	6 ft 1 in (1.85 m)	185 lb (84 kg)	Jr	Illinois	Lafayette, Indiana
F	1	Ladji Dembele	6 ft 8 in (2.03 m)	255 lb (116 kg)	Jr	Iowa	Newark, New Jersey
F	2	Kimani Hamilton	6 ft 8 in (2.03 m)	225 lb (102 kg)	Sr	High Point	Jackson, Mississippi
G	3	Howie Fleming Jr.	6 ft 5 in (1.96 m)	210 lb (95 kg)	RS Sr	UTRGV	Louisville, Kentucky
F	6	Tyrin Jones	6 ft 9 in (2.06 m)	190 lb (86 kg)	Fr	Layton Christian Academy	Las Vegas, Nevada
G	7	Al Green	6 ft 3 in (1.91 m)	185 lb (84 kg)	Sr	Louisiana Tech	Sacramento, California
G	8	Mason Abittan	6 ft 6 in (1.98 m)	205 lb (93 kg)	Fr	Coronado HS	Las Vegas, Nevada
F	10	Jacob Bannarbie	6 ft 9 in (2.06 m)	235 lb (107 kg)	RS So	Hillcrest Prep	Anchorage, Alaska
G	12	Issac Williamson	6 ft 0 in (1.83 m)	165 lb (75 kg)	Fr	Eleanor Roosevelt HS	Moreno Valley, California
F	13	Jalen Cunningham	6 ft 2 in (1.88 m)	185 lb (84 kg)	RS So	Cabrillo College	Las Vegas, Nevada
F	22	Walter Brown	6 ft 5 in (1.96 m)	210 lb (95 kg)	Sr	Canterbury Rams	Christchurch, New Zealand
F	24	Naas Cunningham	6 ft 7 in (2.01 m)	175 lb (79 kg)	RS Fr	Alabama	West Orange, New Jersey
C	34	Emmanuel Stephen	7 ft 0 in (2.13 m)	230 lb (104 kg)	So	Arizona	Lagos, Nigeria
G	77	Myles Che	6 ft 3 in (1.91 m)	190 lb (86 kg)	Jr	UC Irvine	Walnut, California
F		Xavier Brumfield	6 ft 1 in (1.85 m)	180 lb (82 kg)	RS Fr	SoCal Academy	New Orleans, Louisiana

Head coach

- Josh Pastner (Arizona)

Assistant coach(es)

- Scott Garson (UC Santa Barbara)
- Anthony Wilkins (Kent State)
- Justin Hawkins (UNLV)

Legend

- (C) Team captain
- (S) Suspended
- (I) Ineligible
- (W) Walk-on
- Injured
- Current redshirt

Roster
Last update: October 21, 2025

== Schedule and results ==
Date time, TV	Rank^{#}	Opponent^{#}	Result	Record	High points	High rebounds	High assists	Site (attendance) city, state
Exhibition
October 19, 2025*; 12:00 p.m., B1G+		at Washington	L 62–77		14 – Gibbs-Lawhorn	6 – Bannarbie	2 – Tied	Alaska Airlines Arena (6,774); Seattle, WA
October 28, 2025*; 7:00 p.m., MW Network		Lincoln University (CA)	W 123–59		31 – Gibbs-Lawhorn	14 – Brown	8 – Green	Thomas & Mack Center (4,969); Paradise, NV
Regular season
November 4, 2025*; 7:00 p.m., SSSEN/MW Network		UT Martin	L 81–86	0–1	18 – Gibbs-Lawhorn	9 – Jones	4 – Jones	Thomas & Mack Center (5,235); Paradise, NV
November 8, 2025*; 6:00 p.m., SSSEN/MW Network		Chattanooga	W 101–69	1–1	25 – N. Cunningham	9 – Hamilton	6 – Fleming Jr.	Thomas & Mack Center (4,896); Paradise, NV
November 11, 2025*; 7:00 p.m., SSSEN/MW Network		Montana	L 93–102	1–2	26 – Gibbs-Lawhorn	7 – Jones	6 – Gibbs-Lawhorn	Thomas & Mack Center (5,553); Paradise, NV
November 16, 2025*; 2:00 p.m., ESPN		at Memphis	W 92–78	2–2	25 – Tied	12 – Fleming Jr.	6 – Tied	FedExForum (10,927); Memphis, TN
November 20, 2025*; 7:00 p.m., SSSEN/MW Network		Saint Joseph's	W 99–85	3–2	20 – Gibbs-Lawhorn	11 – Bannarbie	6 – Fleming Jr.	Thomas & Mack Center (5,006); Paradise, NV
November 24, 2025*; 9:00 p.m., TNT		vs. Maryland; Players Era Festival Game 1	L 67–74	3–3	17 – Gibbs-Lawhorn	9 – Fleming Jr.	5 – Tied	MGM Grand Garden Arena (3,581); Paradise, NV
November 25, 2025*; 9:00 p.m., TNT/TruTV		vs. No. 8 Alabama; Players Era Festival Game 2	L 76–115	3–4	25 – Gibbs-Lawhorn	5 – Hamilton	6 – Jones	MGM Grand Garden Arena (2,799); Paradise, NV
November 27, 2025*; 1:30 p.m., TruTV		vs. Rutgers; Players Era Festival	L 65–80	3–5	13 – Tied	7 – Hamilton	5 – Gibbs-Lawhorn	Michelob Ultra Arena; Paradise, NV
December 7, 2025*; 1:00 p.m., ACCNX		at Stanford	W 75–74	4–5	18 – Stephen	10 – Stephen	3 – Hamilton	Maples Pavilion (3,981); Stanford, CA
December 13, 2025*; 6:30 p.m., ESPN+		vs. Tennessee State; Jack Jones Classic	L 60–63	4–6	13 – Gibbs-Lawhorn	9 – Hamilton	4 – Hamilton	Lee's Family Forum; Henderson, NV
December 20, 2025; 4:00 p.m., SSSEN/MW Network		Fresno State	W 84–72	5–6 (1–0)	28 – Gibbs-Lawhorn	7 – Gibbs-Lawhorn	5 – Bannarbie	Thomas & Mack Center (6,113); Paradise, NV
December 29, 2025*; 7:00 p.m., SSSEN/MW Network		La Sierra	W 89–47	6–6	19 – Gibbs-Lawhorn	12 – Bannarbie	6 – Fleming Jr.	Thomas & Mack Center (4,873); Paradise, NV
January 3, 2026; 2:00 p.m., SSSEN/MW Network		Air Force	W 67–39	7–6 (2–0)	14 – Jones	10 – Fleming Jr.	3 – Tied	Thomas & Mack Center (6,321); Paradise, NV
January 6, 2026; 7:00 p.m., CBSSN		at Wyoming	L 66–98	7–7 (2–1)	19 – Hamilton	8 – Jones	2 – Tied	Arena-Auditorium (2,942); Laramie, WY
January 9, 2025; 7:00 p.m., CBSSN		at Colorado State	L 62–70	7–8 (2–2)	14 – Williamson	9 – Bannarbie	2 – Tied	Moby Arena (3,726); Fort Collins, CO
January 13, 2026; 8:00 p.m., CBSSN		Boise State	W 89–85	8–8 (3–2)	33 – Gibbs-Lawthorn	8 – Bannarbie	6 – Gibbs-Lawthorn	Thomas & Mack Center (5,098); Paradise, NV
January 17, 2026; 2:00 p.m., MW Network		at San Jose State	W 76–62	9–8 (4–2)	21 – Fleming Jr.	6 – Stephen	8 – Fleming Jr.	Provident Credit Union Event Center (1,874); San Jose, CA
January 20, 2026; 8:00 p.m., FS1		at Utah State	W 86–76	10–8 (5–2)	21 – Gibbs-Lawhorn	8 – Stephen	3 – Fleming Jr.	Smith Spectrum (9,642); Logan, UT
January 24, 2026; 1:00 p.m., CBS		San Diego State	L 71–82	10–9 (5–3)	27 – Gibbs-Lawhorn	7 – Stephen	3 – Green	Thomas & Mack Center (7,217); Paradise, NV
January 27, 2026; 8:00 p.m., CBSSN		New Mexico	L 61–89	10–10 (5–4)	9 – Tied	6 – Fleming Jr.	5 – Fleming Jr.	Thomas & Mack Center (5,642); Paradise, NV
January 30, 2026; 7:00 p.m., CBSSN		at Nevada; Rivalry	L 76–89	10–11 (5–5)	26 – Gibbs-Lawhorn	6 – Tied	4 – Hamilton	Lawlor Events Center (11,997); Reno, NV
February 3, 2026; 8:00 p.m., FS1		at Fresno State	L 96–98	10–12 (5–6)	28 – Gibbs-Lawhorn	9 – Fleming Jr.	4 – Tied	Save Mart Center (5,557); Fresno, CA
February 7, 2026; 1:30 p.m., FOX		Grand Canyon	W 80–78	11–12 (6–6)	29 – Gibbs-Lawhorn	15 – Bannarbie	5 – Bannarbie	Thomas & Mack Center (6,639); Paradise, NV
February 10, 2026; 8:00 p.m., FS1		San Jose State	W 82−75	12−12 (7−6)	24 – Gibbs-Lawhorn	10 – Hamilton	5 – Gibbs-Lawhorn	Thomas & Mack Center (4,653); Paradise, NV
February 13, 2026; 7:00 p.m., FS1		at Boise State	W 86–83 ^{OT}	13−12 (8−6)	36 – Gibbs-Lawhorn	7 – Brown	4 – Fleming Jr.	ExtraMile Arena (10,155); Boise, ID
February 18, 2026; 8:00 p.m., CBSSN		Colorado State	L 86–91	13–13 (8–7)	31 – Gibbs-Lawhorn	10 – Fleming Jr.	5 – Fleming Jr.	Thomas & Mack Center (5,312); Paradise, NV
February 21, 2026; 12:00 p.m., MW Network		at Air Force	W 91–66	14–13 (9–7)	27 – Hamilton	10 – Fleming Jr.	10 – Fleming Jr.	Clune Arena (1,519); Colorado Springs, CO
February 25, 2026; 6:00 p.m., CBSSN		at Grand Canyon	L 67–80	14–14 (9–8)	30 – Gibbs-Lawhorn	6 – Fleming Jr.	3 – Fleming Jr.	Global Credit Union Arena (6,803); Phoenix, AZ
February 28, 2026; 7:00 p.m., CBSSN		Nevada; Rivalry	W 85–83 ^{OT}	15–14 (10–8)	42 – Gibbs-Lawhorn	12 – Fleming Jr.	7 – Fleming Jr.	Thomas & Mack Center (7,760); Paradise, NV
March 3, 2026; 8:00 p.m., CBSSN		Utah State	W 92–65	16–14 (11–8)	24 – Hamilton	10 – Fleming Jr.	13 – Fleming Jr.	Thomas & Mack Center (5,672); Paradise, NV
March 6, 2026; 7:00 p.m., CBSSN		at San Diego State	L 86–89	16–15 (11–9)	32 – Gibbs-Lawhorn	11 – Fleming Jr.	6 – Hamilton	Viejas Arena (12,414); San Diego, CA
Mountain West tournament
March 11, 2026; 12:00 p.m., MW Network	(8)	vs. (9) Wyoming; First round	W 73–70	17–15	23 – Hamilton	10 – Brown	4 – Hamilton	Thomas & Mack Center; Paradise, NV
March 12, 2026; 12:00 p.m., CBSSN	(8)	vs. (1) Utah State; Quarterfinals	L 60–80	17–16	17 – Gibbs-Lawhorn	9 – Jones	4 – Hamilton	Thomas & Mack Center; Paradise, NV
NIT
March 17, 2026; 8:00 p.m., ESPNU		at (4 T) UC Irvine; First round	W 75–72	18–16	14 – Hamilton	9 – Fleming Jr.	4 – Tied	Bren Events Center (1,113); Irvine, CA
March 22, 2026; 4:00 p.m., ESPNU		at (1 T) Tulsa; Second round	L 66–77	18–17	29 – Gibbs-Lawhorn	8 – Jones	7 – Jones	Reynolds Coliseum (2,432); Tulsa, OK
*Non-conference game. ^{#}Rankings from AP Poll. (#) Tournament seedings in parentheses. T=Tulsa. All times are in Pacific Time.
