= 2025–26 Fresno State Bulldogs men's basketball team =

American college basketball season

2025–26 Fresno State Bulldogs men's basketball
- Conference: Mountain West Conference
- Record: 13–19 (7–13 MW)
- Head coach: Vance Walberg (2nd season)
- Associate head coach: John Welch (2nd season)
- Assistant coaches: Ray Barefield (2nd season); Tyler Johnson (1st season); Chris Stahowski (2nd season); Tory Stamps (1st season)
- Home arena: Save Mart Center (Capacity: 15,596)

2025–26 Mountain West Conference men's basketball standings
	Conf.				Overall
Team	W		L	PCT	W		L	PCT
Utah State †	15	–	5	.750	28	–	6	.824
San Diego State	14	–	6	.700	22	–	11	.667
New Mexico	13	–	7	.650	23	–	10	.697
Grand Canyon	13	–	7	.650	20	–	12	.625
Nevada	12	–	8	.600	22	–	12	.647
Boise State	12	–	8	.600	20	–	12	.625
Colorado State	11	–	9	.550	21	–	12	.636
UNLV	11	–	9	.550	17	–	16	.515
Wyoming	9	–	11	.450	18	–	14	.563
Fresno State	7	–	13	.350	13	–	19	.406
San Jose State	3	–	17	.150	9	–	24	.273
Air Force	0	–	20	.000	3	–	29	.094
† 2026 Mountain West tournament winner As of March 14, 2026

The 2025–26 Fresno State Bulldogs men's basketball team represented California State University, Fresno during the 2025–26 NCAA Division I men's basketball season. The Bulldogs were led by second-year head coach Vance Walberg and play their home games at Save Mart Center in Fresno, California as a member of the Mountain West Conference. This will mark Fresno State's final season as members of the Mountain West Conference before transitioning to the Pac-12 Conference on July 1, 2026.

== Previous season ==
The Bulldogs finished the 2025–26 season 6–26, 2–18 in Mountain West play to finish tenth in the conference. As the 10-seed in the Mountain West Tournament they were defeated by 7-seed Nevada 71–86 in the First Round to end their season.

== Offseason ==
=== Departures ===
Name	Number	Pos.	Height	Weight	Year	Hometown	Reason for departure
Jasir Tremble	0	G	5'10"	155	Junior	Washington, DC	Transferred to Florida Southern
Amir Augillard	1	G	6'5"	220	Junior	Zion, IL	Transferred to Milwaukee
Elijah Price	3	F	6'9"	205	(redshirt) Freshman	Long Beach, CA	Transferred to Nevada
Jalen Weaver	5	G	6'4"	200	Senior	Aurora, CO	Declared ineligible
Joshua Bonga	6	G	6'4"	190	(redshirt) Sophomore	Koblenz, Germany	Entered transfer portal
Pierre Geneste Jr.	7	G	6'11"	230	Junior	Port-au-Prince, Haiti	Transferred to Cal State Bakersfield
Alex Crawford	8	F	6'8"	215	Junior	Chula Vista, CA	Transferred to Rhode Island
Pasha Shemirani	9	F	6'5"	193	(redshirt) Freshman	Los Angeles, CA	Transferred to Pepperdine
Mykell Robinson	11	F	6'7"	205	(redshirt) Junior	Houston, TX	Declared ineligible
Rippen Gill	13	G	6'7"	195	Freshman	Bakersfield, CA	Transferred to College of the Sequoias
Brian Amuneke	21	G	6'4"	180	Freshman	Los Angeles, CA	Transferred to Wichita State
Mor Seck	23	C	7'1"	225	Senior	Ngayene Daour, Senegal	Transferred to Towson

=== Incoming transfers ===
Name	Number	Pos.	Height	Weight	Year	Hometown	Previous college
Jake Heidbreder	3	G	6'5"	185	(redshirt) Senior	Floyds Knobs, IN	Clemson
Cameron Faas	4	G/F	6'7"	212	Senior	Scottsdale, AZ	Kansas City
Jac Mani	11	F	6'8"	217	Junior	Beverly Hills, CA	UC Davis
David Douglas Jr.	15	G	6'5"	208	Junior	Park Forest, IL	Green Bay

=== 2025 recruiting class ===
College recruiting information
Name	Hometown	School	Height	Weight	Commit date
Deshawn Gory; PF	Phoenix, AZ	PHHHoenix Prep	6 ft 6 in (1.98 m)	170 lb (77 kg)	Nov 14, 2024
Deshawn Gory; PF	Recruit ratings: Scout: Rivals: 247Sports: ESPN: (80)				
Wilson Jacques; C	Metz, France	JL Bourg Basket	7 ft 0 in (2.13 m)	264 lb (120 kg)	Jun 2, 2025
Wilson Jacques; C	Recruit ratings: Scout: Rivals: 247Sports: ESPN:				
Gasper Kocevar; C	Novo Mesto, Slovenia	Baskets Oldenberg	6 ft 10 in (2.08 m)	229 lb (104 kg)	Jun 24, 2025
Gasper Kocevar; C	Recruit ratings: Scout: Rivals: 247Sports: ESPN:				
Matteo Porto; SF	Rome, Italy	Sunrise Academy	6 ft 7 in (2.01 m)	210 lb (95 kg)	Dec 12, 2024
Matteo Porto; SF	Recruit ratings: Scout: Rivals: 247Sports: ESPN:				
Bastien Rieber; PG	Riedisheim, France	JDA Dijon Basket	6 ft 2 in (1.88 m)	164 lb (74 kg)	Jun 2, 2025
Bastien Rieber; PG	Recruit ratings: Scout: Rivals: 247Sports: ESPN:				
Aram Soqui Urbano; CG	Rosarito, BC, Mexico	Veritas Academy	6 ft 4 in (1.93 m)	185 lb (84 kg)	Jun 18, 2025
Aram Soqui Urbano; CG	Recruit ratings: Scout: Rivals: 247Sports: ESPN:				
DJ Stickman; PG	Fresno, CA	Clovis West HS	6 ft 2 in (1.88 m)	170 lb (77 kg)	Jan 24, 2025
DJ Stickman; PG	Recruit ratings: Scout: Rivals: 247Sports: ESPN:				
Nathan Zulemie; CG	Nanterre, France	Nanterre 92	6 ft 4 in (1.93 m)	203 lb (92 kg)	Jun 27, 2025
Nathan Zulemie; CG	Recruit ratings: Scout: Rivals: 247Sports: ESPN:				
Overall recruit ranking: Scout: – Rivals: –
Note: In many cases, Scout, Rivals, 247Sports, On3, and ESPN may conflict in their listings of height and weight.; In these cases, the average was taken. ESPN grades are on a 100-point scale.; Sources: "2025 Fresno State Basketball Recruiting Commits". Scout.; "Scout.com Team Recruiting Rankings". Scout.; "2025 Team Ranking". Rivals.

== Roster ==
2025–26 Fresno State Bulldogs men's basketball team
Players
Coaches

Pos.	#	Name	Height	Weight	Year	Previous school	Hometown
G	1	Troy Jenkins	6 ft 4 in (1.93 m)	180 lb (82 kg)	RS Fr	Crean Lutheran HS	Newport Beach, California
G	3	Jake Heidbreder	6 ft 5 in (1.96 m)	185 lb (84 kg)	RS Sr	Clemson	Floyds Knobs, Indiana
G/F	4	Cameron Faas	6 ft 7 in (2.01 m)	212 lb (96 kg)	Sr	Kansas City	Scottsdale, Arizona
G	5	Makhan Diouf	6 ft 11 in (2.11 m)	217 lb (98 kg)	RS Fr	Bella Vista Prep	Dakar, Senegal
G	6	DJ Stickman	6 ft 2 in (1.88 m)	185 lb (84 kg)	Fr	Clovis West HS	Fresno, California
G	7	Aram Soqui Urbano	6 ft 4 in (1.93 m)	185 lb (84 kg)	Fr	Veritas Academy (CA)	Rosarito, Baja California, Mexico
C	9	Gasper Kocevar	6 ft 10 in (2.08 m)	229 lb (104 kg)	Fr	Baskets Oldenburg	Novo Mesto, Slovenia
G	10	Zaon Collins	6 ft 1 in (1.85 m)	180 lb (82 kg)	Jr	Salt Lake CC	Las Vegas, Nevada
F	11	Jac Mani	6 ft 9 in (2.06 m)	243 lb (110 kg)	Jr	UC Davis	Beverly Hills, California
G	15	David Douglas Jr.	6 ft 5 in (1.96 m)	208 lb (94 kg)	Jr	Green Bay	Park Forest, Illinois
C	16	Wilson Jacques	7 ft 0 in (2.13 m)	264 lb (120 kg)	Fr	JL Bourg Basket	Metz, France
G	17	Matteo Porto	6 ft 7 in (2.01 m)	210 lb (95 kg)	Fr	Sunrise Academy	Rome, Italy
G	21	Bastien Rieber	6 ft 2 in (1.88 m)	164 lb (74 kg)	Fr	JDA Dijon Basket	Riedisheim, France
F	35	DeShawn Gory	6 ft 6 in (1.98 m)	165 lb (75 kg)	Fr	PHH Prep	Victorville, California
G	80	Nathan Zulemie	6 ft 4 in (1.93 m)	203 lb (92 kg)	Fr	Nanterre 92	Nanterre, France

Head coach

- Vance Walberg (Cal State Bakersfield)

Assistant coach(es)

- John Welch (UNLV)
- Ray Barefield (San Diego State)
- Tyler Johnson (Fresno State)
- Chris Stahowski (Fresno State)
- Tory Stamps (Evangel University)

Legend

- (C) Team captain
- (S) Suspended
- (I) Ineligible
- (W) Walk-on
- Injured
- Current redshirt

Roster
Last update: 2025-10-26

== Schedule and results ==
Date time, TV	Rank^{#}	Opponent^{#}	Result	Record	High points	High rebounds	High assists	Site (attendance) city, state
Non-conference regular season
November 3, 2025*; 7:30 p.m., MW Network		Fresno Pacific	W 88–51	1–0	19 – Heidbreder	8 – Tied	6 – Collins	Save Mart Center (3,340); Fresno, CA
November 5, 2025*; 6:00 p.m., MW Network		USC Upstate	L 66–67	1–1	18 – Collins	7 – Jacques	3 – Collins	Save Mart Center (2,722); Fresno, CA
November 8, 2025*; 2:00 p.m., MW Network		Long Beach State	W 82–62	2–1	24 – Heidbreder	13 – Jacques	5 – Collins	Save Mart Center (3,133); Fresno, CA
November 12, 2025*; 6:00 p.m., MW Network		UC San Diego	L 73–78	2–2	22 – Beath	7 – Beath	4 – Prospere II	Save Mart Center (2,950); Fresno, CA
November 15, 2025*; 7:00 p.m., MW Network		Utah Valley	W 75–74	3–2	27 – Collins	7 – Mani	3 – Tied	Save Mart Center (2,969); Fresno, CA
November 18, 2025*; 6:00 p.m., MW Network		Stephen F. Austin; Acrisure Series on-campus game	W 80–78	4–2	20 – Gory	8 – Stickman	7 – Collins	Save Mart Center (2,953); Fresno, CA
November 21, 2025*; 6:00 p.m., MW Network		New Orleans; Acrisure Series on-campus game	W 85–76	5–2	33 – Heidbreder	10 – Collins	7 – Collins	Save Mart Center (3,874); Fresno, CA
November 26, 2025*; 4:00 p.m., CBSSN		vs. Pepperdine; Acrisure Series	W 76–53	6–2	27 – Heidbreder	7 – Gory	9 – Collins	Acrisure Arena; Thousand Palms, CA
November 30, 2025*; 3:00 p.m., MW Network		vs. Cal State Bakersfield; Return to Selland	L 71–76	6–3	20 – Heidbreder	11 – Jacques	4 – Collins	Selland Arena (4,374); Fresno, CA
December 6, 2025*; 1:00 p.m., SEC+		vs. No. 25 Arkansas	L 58–82	6–4	12 – Tied	14 – Jacques	5 – Rieber	Simmons Bank Arena (11,534); North Little Rock, AR
December 10, 2025*; 7:00 p.m., ESPN+		at Cal State Northridge	L 87–89	6–5	24 – Collins	10 – Jacques	3 – Tied	Premier America Credit Union Arena (756); Northridge, CA
Mountain West regular season
December 20, 2025; 4:00 p.m., MW Network		at UNLV	L 72–84	6–6 (0–1)	18 – Jacques	11 – Jacques	7 – Jacques	Thomas & Mack Center (6,113); Las Vegas, NV
December 30, 2025; 6:00 p.m., MW Network		Utah State	L 63–72	6–7 (0–2)	21 – Heidbreder	12 – Jacques	2 – Tied	Save Mart Center (4,106); Fresno, CA
January 3, 2026; 4:00 p.m., MW Network		Nevada	L 65–66	6–8 (0–3)	14 – Heidbreder	12 – Jacques	7 – Collins	Save Mart Center (4,027); Fresno, CA
January 6, 2026; 7:00 p.m., MW Network		at San Jose State	W 70–55	7–8 (1–3)	16 – Gory	13 – Gory	7 – Collins	Provident Credit Union Event Center (1,326); San Jose, CA
January 10, 2026; 8:00 p.m., CBSSN		at San Diego State	L 52–71	7–9 (1–4)	16 – Gory	14 – Gory	4 – Tied	Viejas Arena (10,544); San Diego, CA
January 13, 2026; 6:00 p.m., MW Network		Colorado State	W 79–69	8–9 (2–4)	23 – Heidbreder	12 – Jacques	5 – Collins	Save Mart Center (3,176); Fresno, CA
January 17, 2026; 4:00 p.m., MW Network		Wyoming	W 63–60	9–9 (3–4)	13 – Tied	9 – Jacques	4 – Heidbreder	Save Mart Center (6,539); Fresno, CA
January 21, 2026; 6:00 p.m., CBSSN		at New Mexico	L 74–83	9–10 (3–5)	31 – Gory	14 – Gory	5 – Gory	The Pit (11,924); Albuquerque, NM
January 24, 2026; 4:30 p.m., MW Network		Grand Canyon	L 57–68	9–11 (3–6)	19 – Gory	10 – Gory	3 – Collins	Save Mart Center (6,462); Fresno, CA
January 31, 2026; 12:00 p.m., MW Network		at Air Force	W 79–62	10–11 (4–6)	21 – Douglas Jr.	10 – Gory	5 – Collins	Clune Arena (1,437); Colorado Springs, CO
February 3, 2026; 8:00 p.m., FS1		UNLV	W 98–96	11–11 (5–6)	29 – Heidbreder	7 – Jacques	4 – Rieber	Save Mart Center (5,557); Fresno, CA
February 7, 2026; 7:00 p.m., MW Network		at Nevada	L 59–69	11–12 (5–7)	17 – Gory	7 – Jacques	4 – Gory	Lawlor Events Center (10,032); Reno, NV
February 10, 2026; 6:00 p.m., CBSSN		at Utah State	L 78–91	11–13 (5–8)	21 – Gory	11 – Jacques	5 – Gory	Smith Spectrum (10,270); Logan, UT
February 14, 2026; 2:00 p.m., MW Network		Air Force	W 93–63	12–13 (6–8)	18 – Tied	9 – Jacques	4 – Tied	Save Mart Center (4,244); Fresno, CA
February 17, 2026; 5:30 p.m., MW Network		at Wyoming	L 82–92	12–14 (6–9)	19 – Jacques	12 – Jacques	5 – Tied	Arena-Auditorium (3,755); Laramie, WY
February 21, 2026; 5:00 p.m., CBSSN		New Mexico	L 78–80	12–15 (6–10)	22 – Heidbreder	10 – Jacques	4 – Heidbreder	Save Mart Center (5,402); Fresno, CA
February 24, 2026; 6:00 p.m., MW Network		at Colorado State	L 70−74	12−16 (6−11)	23 – Gory	8 – Jacques	4 – Tied	Moby Arena (5,013); Fort Collins, CO
February 28, 2026; 4:30 p.m., MW Network		Boise State	L 53–69	12−17 (6−12)	20 – Gory	11 – Gory	5 – Rieber	Save Mart Center (6,142); Fresno, CA
March 3, 2026; 6:00 p.m., MW Network		San Jose State	W 82–68	13−17 (7−12)	20 – Heidbreder	19 – Jacques	6 – Rieber	Save Mart Center; Fresno, CA
March 7, 2026; 5:00 p.m., MW Network		at Grand Canyon	L 60–85	13−18 (7−13)	15 – Jacques	9 – Gory	4 – Heidbreder	Global Credit Union Arena (7,233); Phoenix, AZ
Mountain West tournament
March 11, 2026; 6:00 p.m., MW Network	(10)	vs. (7) Colorado State; First round	L 63–67	13–19	26 – Heidbreder	10 – Gory	4 – Rieber	Thomas & Mack Center; Las Vegas, NV
*Non-conference game. ^{#}Rankings from AP Poll. (#) Tournament seedings in parentheses. All times are in Pacific Time.
