= 2025–26 San Jose State Spartans men's basketball team =

American college basketball season

2025–26 San Jose State Spartans men's basketball
- Conference: Mountain West Conference
- Record: 9–24 (3–17 MW)
- Head coach: Tim Miles (5th season)
- Assistant coaches: Damany Hendrix (5th season); Jeff Strohm (4th season); Ed Gipson (3rd season); Tim Marrion (3rd season); Jack Townsend (1st season)
- Home arena: Provident Credit Union Event Center (Capacity: 5,000)

2025–26 Mountain West Conference men's basketball standings
	Conf.				Overall
Team	W		L	PCT	W		L	PCT
Utah State †	15	–	5	.750	29	–	7	.806
San Diego State	14	–	6	.700	22	–	11	.667
New Mexico	13	–	7	.650	26	–	11	.703
Grand Canyon	13	–	7	.650	20	–	12	.625
Nevada	12	–	8	.600	24	–	13	.649
Boise State	12	–	8	.600	20	–	12	.625
Colorado State	11	–	9	.550	21	–	13	.618
UNLV	11	–	9	.550	18	–	17	.514
Wyoming	9	–	11	.450	18	–	15	.545
Fresno State	7	–	13	.350	13	–	19	.406
San Jose State	3	–	17	.150	9	–	24	.273
Air Force	0	–	20	.000	3	–	29	.094
† 2026 Mountain West tournament winner

The 2025–26 San Jose State Spartans men's basketball team represented San Jose State University during the 2025–26 NCAA Division I men's basketball season. The Spartans were led by fifth-year head coach Tim Miles and played their home games at Provident Credit Union Event Center in San Jose, California as a member of the Mountain West Conference.

== Previous season ==
The Spartans finished the 2024–25 season 15–20, 7–13 in Mountain West play to finish in eighth place. They defeated Wyoming in the first round of the Mountain West tournament before falling to top-seeded New Mexico in the quarterfinals. They received an invitation to the National Invitation Tournament as the No. 4 seed in the San Francisco region. There the Spartans lost to Loyola Chicago in the first round.

== Offseason ==
=== Departures ===
Name	Number	Pos.	Height	Weight	Year	Hometown	Reason for departure
Donovan Yap Jr.	0	G	6'5"	175	Graduate	Las Vegas, NV	Out of eligibility
Will McClendon	1	G	6'3"	195	(redshirt) Sophomore	Sacramento, CA	Transferred to North Texas
Adrame Diongue	4	C	7'0"	200	Junior	Dakar, Senegal	Entered transfer portal
Latrell Davis	5	G	6'3"	210	Sophomore	Leeds. England	Transferred to San Diego State
Sadaidriene Hall	6	F	6'5"	210	Graduate	Sulphur Springs, TX	Out of eligibility
Cameron Patterson	8	G	6'5"	180	Freshman	Houston, TX	Entered transfer portal
Josh Uduje	9	F	6'5"	190	Senior	London, England	Entered transfer portal
Chol Marial	15	C	7'2"	230	Graduate	Rumbek, South Sudan	Out of eligibility
Robert Vaihola	22	F	6'8"	260	(redshirt) Junior	San Mateo, CA	Transferred to Minnesota
Ameere Britton	23	G	6'2"	196	Junior	Sacramento, CA	Departed program
Steven Vasquez	33	G	6'2"	188	Senior	Santa Maria, CA	Out of eligibility

=== Incoming transfers ===
Name	Number	Pos.	Height	Weight	Year	Hometown	Previous college
Colby Garland	0	G	6'0"	190	Junior	Magnolia, AR	Longwood
Adrian Myers	1	F	6'6"	205	(redshirt) Sophomore	Stephens City, VA	Mississippi State
JaVaughn Hannah	2	G	6'3"	200	Senior	Mount Clemens, MI	Western Michigan
Yaphet Moundi	32	F	6'8"	237	Senior	Paris, France	Iona
Marcus Overstreet	33	F	6'9"	230	Junior	Chicago, IL	Mercer

=== Recruiting class ===
College recruiting
Name	Hometown	School	Height	Weight	Commit date
Melvin Bell; SG	La Porte, IN	La Lumiere School	6 ft 4 in (1.93 m)	170 lb (77 kg)	Nov 14, 2024
Melvin Bell; SG	Recruit ratings: Scout: Rivals: 247Sports: ESPN: (NR)				
Damase Coly; SG/PG	Dublin, CA	Dublin HS	6 ft 1 in (1.85 m)	N/A	
Damase Coly; SG/PG	Recruit ratings: Scout: Rivals: 247Sports: ESPN: (NR)				
Eren Karakaya; C	Kütahya, Turkey		6 ft 10 in (2.08 m)	185 lb (84 kg)	Aug 30, 2025
Eren Karakaya; C	Recruit ratings: Scout: Rivals: 247Sports: ESPN: (NR)				
Douglas Langford; C	Downey, CA	St. Pius X-St. Matthias Academy	6 ft 7 in (2.01 m)	215 lb (98 kg)	Apr 23, 2025
Douglas Langford; C	Recruit ratings: Scout: Rivals: 247Sports: ESPN: (NR)				
Japhet Moupadele; PF	Lille, France		6 ft 8 in (2.03 m)	220 lb (100 kg)	Jun 12, 2025
Japhet Moupadele; PF	Recruit ratings: Scout: Rivals: 247Sports: ESPN: (NR)				
Overall recruit ranking: Scout: – Rivals: –
Note: In many cases, Scout, Rivals, 247Sports, On3, and ESPN may conflict in their listings of height and weight.; In these cases, the average was taken. ESPN grades are on a 100-point scale.; Sources: "2025 San Jose State Basketball Recruiting Commits". Scout.; "Scout.com Team Recruiting Rankings". Scout.; "2025 Team Ranking". Rivals.

== Roster ==
2025–26 San Jose State Spartans men's basketball team
Players
Coaches

Pos.	#	Name	Height	Weight	Year	Previous school	Hometown
G	0	Colby Garland	6 ft 0 in (1.83 m)	190 lb (86 kg)	Jr	Longwood	Magnolia, Arkansas
F	1	Adrian Myers	6 ft 6 in (1.98 m)	205 lb (93 kg)	RS So	Mississippi State	Stephens City, Virginia
G	2	JaVaughn Hannah	6 ft 3 in (1.91 m)	200 lb (91 kg)	Sr	Western Michigan	Mount Clemens, Michigan
G	4	Melvin Bell Jr.	6 ft 4 in (1.93 m)	195 lb (88 kg)	Fr	La Lumiere HS	Chicago, Illinois
G	7	Pasha Goodarzi	6 ft 3 in (1.91 m)	193 lb (88 kg)	RS So	Valley Christian HS	Los Gatos, California
G	8	Damase Coly	6 ft 2 in (1.88 m)	171 lb (78 kg)	Fr	Dublin HS	Dublin, California
G	11	Ben Roseborough	6 ft 4 in (1.93 m)	205 lb (93 kg)	RS Fr	Bella Vista Prep	Sacramento, California
G	13	Jermaine Washington	6 ft 1 in (1.85 m)	180 lb (82 kg)	So	Rancho Verde HS	Hemet, California
C	14	Eren Karakaya	6 ft 10 in (2.08 m)	229 lb (104 kg)	RS Fr	Özel Sisli Bilim Doga Anadolu Lisesi	Kütahya, Turkey
F	17	Jaden Goodall	6 ft 6 in (1.98 m)	175 lb (79 kg)	RS Fr	Canyon HS	Yorba Linda, California
F	20	Christian Wise	6 ft 6 in (1.98 m)	205 lb (93 kg)	RS So	Archbishop Riordan HS	San Francisco, California
F	21	Japhet Moupadele	6 ft 8 in (2.03 m)	220 lb (100 kg)	Fr	Lycée Louis Pasteur	Lille, France
F	24	Douglas Langford	6 ft 7 in (2.01 m)	240 lb (109 kg)	Fr	St. Pius X - St. Matthias Academy	Dangriga, Belize
F	32	Yaphet Moundi	6 ft 8 in (2.03 m)	237 lb (108 kg)	Sr	Iona	Paris, France
F	33	Marcus Overstreet	6 ft 9 in (2.06 m)	230 lb (104 kg)	Jr	Mercer	Chicago, Illinois
F	99	Sadraque NgaNga	6 ft 10 in (2.08 m)	220 lb (100 kg)	Sr	Seton Hall	Luanda, Angola

Head coach

- Tim Miles (Mary)

Assistant coach(es)

- Damany Hendrix (Lamar)
- Jeff Strohm (Eastern Illinois)
- Ed Gipson (Calumet College)
- Tim Marrion (Washington State)
- Jack Townsend (San José State)

Legend

- (C) Team captain
- (S) Suspended
- (I) Ineligible
- (W) Walk-on
- Injured
- Current redshirt

Roster
Last update: 2025-10-21

== Schedule and results ==
Date time, TV	Rank^{#}	Opponent^{#}	Result	Record	High points	High rebounds	High assists	Site (attendance) city, state
Exhibition
October 27, 2025*; 7:00 p.m.		Cal State East Bay	W 73–60		–	–	–	Provident Credit Union Event Center; San Jose, CA
Non-conference regular season
November 3, 2025*; 6:00 p.m., ESPN+		at Utah	L 75–84	0–1	21 – Garland	13 – Moundi	4 – Garland	Jon M. Huntsman Center (5,932); Salt Lake City, UT
November 8, 2025*; 1:00 p.m., ESPN+		at UC Santa Barbara	L 74–85	0–2	30 – Garland	5 – Bell Jr.	4 – Garland	The Thunderdome (3,024); Santa Barbara, CA
November 13, 2025*; 3:30 p.m., BTN		at No. 17 Michigan State	L 60–79	0–3	22 – Garland	11 – Moundi	5 – Washington	Breslin Center (14,797); East Lansing, MI
November 17, 2025*; 7:00 p.m., MW Network		Bethesda	W 110–56	1–3	17 – Garland	13 – Overstreet	6 – Tied	Provident Credit Union Event Center (2,087); San Jose, CA
November 21, 2025*; 7:00 p.m., MW Network		Southern; Acrisure Series on-campus game	W 80–66	2–3	21 – Moundi	11 – Tied	5 – Garland	Provident Credit Union Event Center (1,773); San Jose, CA
November 25, 2025*; 10:30 a.m., CBSSN		vs. Tulsa; Acrisure Holiday Invitational semifinal	L 51–81	2–4	13 – Garland	6 – Moundi	2 – Tied	Acrisure Arena; Thousand Palms, CA
November 26, 2025*; 11:00 a.m., CBSSN		vs. Loyola Chicago; Acrisure Holiday Invitational third-place game	W 63–51	3–4	15 – Tied	6 – NgaNga	6 – Garland	Acrisure Arena; Thousand Palms, CA
November 30, 2025*; 2:00 p.m., MW Network		UC Irvine	L 63–72	3–5	12 – Roseborough	9 – Moundi	3 – Washington	Provident Credit Union Event Center (1,382); San Jose, CA
December 5, 2025*; 7:00 p.m., MW Network		San Diego	W 86–69	4–5	20 – Tied	12 – Moundi	6 – Washington	Provident Credit Union Event Center (1,964); San Jose, CA
December 9, 2025*; 7:00 p.m., MW Network		Long Beach State	W 89–83	5–5	27 – Garland	5 – Garland	6 – Washington	Provident Credit Union Event Center (1,472); San Jose, CA
December 13, 2025*; 4:00 p.m., CBSSN		Stanford	L 82–86	5–6	26 – Moundi	5 – Moundi	9 – Garland	Provident Credit Union Event Center (2,745); San Jose, CA
Mountain West regular season
December 20, 2025; 6:00 p.m., MW Network		at New Mexico	L 65–88	5–7 (0–1)	27 – Garland	7 – Moundi	3 – Tied	The Pit (12,785); Albuquerque, NM
December 30, 2025; 7:00 p.m., CBSSN		San Diego State	L 68–81	5–8 (0–2)	30 – Garland	8 – Langford	3 – Washington	Provident Credit Union Event Center (3,585); San Jose, CA
January 3, 2026; 1:00 p.m., MW Network		at Utah State	L 78–96	5–9 (0–3)	18 – Washington	5 – Bell Jr.	5 – Garland	Smith Spectrum (8,972); Logan, UT
January 6, 2026; 7:00 p.m., MW Network		Fresno State	L 55–70	5–10 (0–4)	16 – Bell Jr.	6 – Bell Jr.	6 – Washington	Provident Credit Union Event Center (1,326); San Jose, CA
January 10, 2026; 5:00 p.m., MW Network		at Grand Canyon	L 58–76	5–11 (0–5)	23 – Roseborough	5 – Tied	1 – Tied	Global Credit Union Arena (7,003); Phoenix, AZ
January 13, 2026; 7:00 p.m., MW Network		Air Force	W 70–62	6–11 (1–5)	19 – Roseborough	7 – Myers	3 – Goodarzi	Provident Credit Union Event Center (1,271); San Jose, CA
January 17, 2026; 2:00 p.m., MW Network		UNLV	L 62–76	6–12 (1–6)	22 – Bell Jr.	8 – Bell Jr.	2 – NgaNga	Provident Credit Union Event Center (1,874); San Jose, CA
January 20, 2026; 7:00 p.m., MW Network		at Nevada	L 54–87	6–13 (1–7)	15 – Bell Jr.	7 – Overstreet	2 – Tied	Lawlor Events Center (7,852); Reno, NV
January 24, 2026; 1:00 p.m., MW Network		at Wyoming	L 62–66	6–14 (1–8)	14 – Tied	6 – NgaNga	7 – Garland	Arena-Auditorium (4,125); Laramie, WY
January 27, 2026; 7:00 p.m., MW Network		Boise State	L 58–89	6–15 (1–9)	15 – NgaNga	7 – Overstreet	4 – Garland	Provident Credit Union Event Center (1,874); San Jose, CA
January 31, 2026; 7:00 p.m., CBSSN		New Mexico	L 80–90	6–16 (1–10)	24 – Garland	7 – Tied	6 – Garland	Provident Credit Union Event Center (4,189); San Jose, CA
February 7, 2025; 6:00 p.m., MW Network		at Colorado State	L 57–65	6–17 (1–11)	21 – Garland	4 – Myers	4 – Myers	Moby Arena (5,103); Fort Collins, CO
February 10, 2026; 8:00 p.m., FS1		at UNLV	L 75−82	6−18 (1−12)	23 – Garland	8 – NgaNga	8 – Myers	Thomas & Mack Center (4,653); Paradise, NV
February 14, 2026; 2:00 p.m., MW Network		Grand Canyon	L 79–94	6–19 (1–13)	23 – Garland	4 – Tied	7 – Garland	Provident Credit Union Event Center (2,119); San Jose, CA
February 17, 2026; 7:00 p.m., MW Network		Nevada	W 87–71	7–19 (2–13)	29 – Garland	13 – Myers	9 – Garland	Provident Credit Union Event Center (2,261); San Jose, CA
February 21, 2026; 1:00 p.m., MW Network		at Boise State	L 69–84	7–20 (2–14)	23 – Myers	8 – Tied	5 – Garland	ExtraMile Arena (10,761); Boise, ID
February 24, 2026; 6:00 p.m., MW Network		at Air Force	W 86−80	8−20 (3−14)	34 – Myers	7 – Myers	5 – Garland	Clune Arena (851); Colorado Springs, CO
February 28, 2026; 2:00 p.m., MW Network		Colorado State	L 73–85	8−21 (3−15)	28 – Garland	6 – Bell Jr.	8 – Garland	Provident Credit Union Event Center (2,183); San Jose, CA
March 3, 2026; 6:00 p.m., MW Network		at Fresno State	L 68–82	8−22 (3−16)	26 – Garland	16 – Myers	3 – Garland	Save Mart Center; Fresno, CA
March 7, 2026; 2:00 p.m., MW Network		Wyoming	L 78–88	8−23 (3−17)	24 – Garland	4 – Tied	5 – Garland	Provident Credit Union Event Center (2,183); San Jose, CA
Mountain West tournament
March 11, 2026; 8:30 p.m., MW Network	(11)	vs. (6) Boise State; First round	W 84–74	9–23	22 – Garland	10 – Myers	6 – Washington	Thomas & Mack Center (2,351); Paradise, NV
March 12, 2026; 8:30 p.m., CBSSN	(11)	vs. (3) New Mexico; Quarterfinal	L 77–93	9–24	20 – Garland	6 – Myers	7 – Garland	Thomas & Mack Center (6,236); Paradise, NV
*Non-conference game. ^{#}Rankings from AP Poll. (#) Tournament seedings in parentheses. All times are in Pacific Time.
