= 2025–26 Utah State Aggies men's basketball team =

American college basketball season

2025–26 Utah State Aggies men's basketball

Shriners Children's Charleston Classic Lowcountry Bracket champion Mountain West regular season and tournament champion

NCAA tournament, Second round
- Conference: Mountain West Conference
- Record: 29–7 (15–5 MW)
- Head coach: Jerrod Calhoun (2nd season)
- Associate head coach: Eric Haut (2nd season)
- Assistant coaches: Mantoris Robinson (2nd season); Ben Asher (2nd season); Johnny Hill (1st season); Max Bent (1st season)
- Home arena: Dee Glen Smith Spectrum (Capacity: 10,270)

2025–26 Mountain West Conference men's basketball standings
	Conf.				Overall
Team	W		L	PCT	W		L	PCT
Utah State †	15	–	5	.750	29	–	7	.806
San Diego State	14	–	6	.700	22	–	11	.667
New Mexico	13	–	7	.650	26	–	11	.703
Grand Canyon	13	–	7	.650	20	–	12	.625
Nevada	12	–	8	.600	24	–	13	.649
Boise State	12	–	8	.600	20	–	12	.625
Colorado State	11	–	9	.550	21	–	13	.618
UNLV	11	–	9	.550	18	–	17	.514
Wyoming	9	–	11	.450	18	–	15	.545
Fresno State	7	–	13	.350	13	–	19	.406
San Jose State	3	–	17	.150	9	–	24	.273
Air Force	0	–	20	.000	3	–	29	.094
† 2026 Mountain West tournament winner

The 2025–26 Utah State Aggies men's basketball team represented Utah State University during the 2025–26 NCAA Division I men's basketball season. The Aggies, led by second-year head coach Jerrod Calhoun, played their home games at Dee Glen Smith Spectrum in Logan, Utah as a member of the Mountain West Conference. This will mark Utah State's final season as members of the Mountain West Conference before transitioning to the Pac-12 Conference on July 1, 2026.

== Previous season ==
The Aggies finished the 2025-26 season 26–8, 18–5 in Mountain West play to finish third in the conference. As the 3-seed in the Mountain West Tournament they would defeat 6-seed UNLV in the First round before falling to 2-seed Colorado State in the Semifinals. The Aggies received an at-large bid to the NCAA Tournament and were selected as the 10-seed in the Midwest region. They were defeated by 7-seed UCLA 72–47 in the First round to end their season.

== Offseason ==
=== Departures ===
Name	Number	Pos.	Height	Weight	Year	Hometown	Reason for departure
Braden Housley	0	G	6'4"	180	(redshirt) Sophomore	Lehi, UT	Transferred to Utah Valley
Pavle Stošić	1	F	6'9"	215	Sophomore	Niš, Serbia	Transferred to Pepperdine
Jaxon Smith	3	G	6'2"	188	Sophomore	Bountiful, UT	Transferred to Fort Lewis
Ian Martinez	4	G	6'3"	185	Graduate	Heredia, Costa Rica	Out of eligibility
Dexter Akanno	7	G	6'5"	210	Graduate	Valencia, CA	Out of eligibility
Deyton Albury	13	G	6'2"	190	Senior	Nassau, The Bahamas	Transferred to New Mexico
Isaac Johnson	20	C	7'0"	227	(redshirt) Junior	American Fork, UT	Transferred to Hawaii
Aubin Gateretse	21	C	6'11"	225	Senior	Charleroi, Belgium	Out of eligibility
Isaac Davis	23	F	6'8"	240	Freshman	Idaho Falls, ID	Transferred to Utah Valley

=== Incoming transfers ===
Name	Number	Pos.	Height	Weight	Year	Hometown	Previous college
MJ Collins Jr.	2	G	6'4"	195	Senior	Clover, SC	Vanderbilt
Kolby King	7	G	6'1"	185	Senior	Pompano Beach, FL	Butler
Garry Clark	11	F	6'9"	220	Graduate	St. Louis, MO	Texas A&M-Corpus Christi
Luke Kearney	20	F	6'7"	220	Junior	Phoenix, AZ	Air Force
Zach Keller	32	F	6'10"	245	Senior	Highlands Ranch, CO	Utah

=== 2025 recruiting class ===
College recruiting information
Name	Hometown	School	Height	Weight	Commit date
Brayden Boe; SG	Beaverton, OR	Dream City Christian	6 ft 4 in (1.93 m)	180 lb (82 kg)	Nov 15, 2024
Brayden Boe; SG	Recruit ratings: Scout: Rivals: 247Sports: ESPN: (80)				
Adlan Elamin; PF	Fairfax, VA	St. Paul VI Catholic HS	6 ft 8 in (2.03 m)	180 lb (82 kg)	Nov 15, 2024
Adlan Elamin; PF	Recruit ratings: Scout: Rivals: 247Sports: ESPN: (81)				
David Iweze; C	Lewisville, TX	iSchool Entrepreneurial Academy	6 ft 9 in (2.06 m)	215 lb (98 kg)	Nov 15, 2024
David Iweze; C	Recruit ratings: Scout: Rivals: 247Sports: ESPN:				
Elijah Perryman; PG	Concord, CA	Clayton Valley HS	6 ft 1 in (1.85 m)	170 lb (77 kg)	Nov 15, 2024
Elijah Perryman; PG	Recruit ratings: Scout: Rivals: 247Sports: ESPN:				
Kingston Tosi; PF	Goodyear, AZ	Millenium HS	6 ft 7 in (2.01 m)	195 lb (88 kg)	Nov 15, 2024
Kingston Tosi; PF	Recruit ratings: Scout: Rivals: 247Sports: ESPN: (80)				
Overall recruit ranking: Scout: – Rivals: –
Note: In many cases, Scout, Rivals, 247Sports, On3, and ESPN may conflict in their listings of height and weight.; In these cases, the average was taken. ESPN grades are on a 100-point scale.; Sources: "2025 Utah State Basketball Recruiting Commits". Scout.; "Scout.com Team Recruiting Rankings". Scout.; "2025 Team Ranking". Rivals.

== Roster ==
2025–26 Utah State Aggies men's basketball team
Players
Coaches

Pos.	#	Name	Height	Weight	Year	Previous school	Hometown
G	1	Elijah Perryman	6 ft 2 in (1.88 m)	190 lb (86 kg)	Fr	Clayton Valley Charter HS	San Francisco, California
G	2	MJ Collins Jr.	6 ft 4 in (1.93 m)	195 lb (88 kg)	Sr	Vanderbilt	Clover, South Carolina
G/F	3	Tucker Anderson	6 ft 9 in (2.06 m)	230 lb (104 kg)	Jr	Central Arkansas	Centerton, Arkansas
G	4	Braydon Boe	6 ft 5 in (1.96 m)	200 lb (91 kg)	Fr	Dream City Christian	Beaverton, Oregon
G	5	Jordy Barnes	6 ft 4 in (1.93 m)	185 lb (84 kg)	So	Olympus HS	Holladay, Utah
G	7	Kolby King	6 ft 1 in (1.85 m)	185 lb (84 kg)	Sr	Butler	Pompano Beach, Florida
G	8	Drake Allen	6 ft 5 in (1.96 m)	205 lb (93 kg)	GS	Utah Valley	Eagle Mountain, Utah
F	11	Garry Clark	6 ft 9 in (2.06 m)	220 lb (100 kg)	GS	Texas A&M-Corpus Christi	St. Louis, Missouri
G	12	Mason Falslev	6 ft 4 in (1.93 m)	200 lb (91 kg)	Jr	Sky View HS	Benson, Utah
F	13	David Iweze	6 ft 10 in (2.08 m)	240 lb (109 kg)	Fr	iSchool Academy	Roanoke, Texas
F	20	Luke Kearney	6 ft 7 in (2.01 m)	220 lb (100 kg)	Jr	Air Force	Phoenix, Arizona
F	22	Karson Templin	6 ft 9 in (2.06 m)	230 lb (104 kg)	Jr	Lovejoy HS	Fairview, Texas
G/F	24	Kingston Tosi	6 ft 8 in (2.03 m)	205 lb (93 kg)	Fr	Millenium HS	Anchorage, Alaska
F	32	Zach Keller	6 ft 10 in (2.08 m)	245 lb (111 kg)	Sr	Utah	Highlands Ranch, Colorado
G/F	35	Adlan Elamin	6 ft 9 in (2.06 m)	185 lb (84 kg)	Fr	St. Paul VI Catholic HS	Arlington, Virginia

Head coach

- Jerrod Calhoun (Cincinnati)

Assistant coach(es)

- Eric Haut (Kent State)
- Mantoris Robinson (Winthrop)
- Ben Asher (West Virginia)
- Johnny Hill (UT Arlington)
- Max Bent (Michigan)

Legend

- (C) Team captain
- (S) Suspended
- (I) Ineligible
- (W) Walk-on
- Injured
- Current redshirt

Roster
Last update: 2025-10-23

== Schedule and results ==
Date time, TV	Rank^{#}	Opponent^{#}	Result	Record	High points	High rebounds	High assists	Site (attendance) city, state
Exhibition
October 18, 2025*; 1:00 p.m.		Seattle	W 88–76		15 – Collins Jr.	6 – Templin	6 – Allen	Dee Glen Smith Spectrum (3,711); Logan, UT
October 25, 2025*; 8:00 p.m.		at San Francisco	W 79–74		17 – Collins Jr.	7 – Clark	9 – Allen	Sobrato Center (2,575); San Francisco, CA
Regular season
November 3, 2025*; 7:00 p.m., MW Network		Westminster	W 110–54	1–0	23 – Collins Jr.	11 – Clark	9 – Allen	Dee Glen Smith Spectrum (8,927); Logan, UT
November 7, 2025*; 6:00 p.m., Urban Edge Network		vs. VCU; Texas Showcase	W 80–77	2–0	18 – Falslev	14 – Clark	9 – Allen	Comerica Center (2,049); Frisco, TX
November 12, 2025*; 7:00 p.m., MW Network		Weber State	W 83–73	3–0	16 – Templin	8 – King	3 – Tied	Dee Glen Smith Spectrum (9,124); Logan, UT
November 15, 2025*; 2:00 p.m., MW Network		UTEP	W 75–51	4–0	20 – Clark	13 – Clark	5 – Perryman	Dee Glen Smith Spectrum (7,942); Logan, UT
November 21, 2025*; 11:00 a.m., ESPN2		vs. Tulane; Shriners Children's Charleston Classic; Lowcountry Bracket Semifinal	W 96–75	5–0	24 – Falslev	7 – Falslev	8 – Allen	TD Arena (2,112); Charleston, SC
November 23, 2025*; 7:00 p.m., ESPN2		vs. Davidson; Shriners Children's Charleston Classic; Lowcountry Bracket Final	W 94–60	6–0	40 – Collins Jr.	7 – Clark	7 – Allen	TD Arena (1,817); Charleston, SC
November 29, 2025*; 2:00 p.m., MW Network		Montana State	W 84–81 ^{OT}	7–0	23 – Collins Jr.	8 – Tied	9 – Allen	Dee Glen Smith Spectrum (8,189); Logan, UT
December 4, 2025*; 5:00 p.m., ESPN+		at South Florida	L 61–74	7–1	19 – Tied	8 – Falslev	5 – Perryman	Yuengling Center (4,131); Tampa, FL
December 7, 2025*; 12:00 p.m., ESPN+		at Charlotte	W 79–53	8–1	22 – Falslev	5 – Falslev	6 – Falslev	Dale F. Halton Arena (2,530); Charlotte, NC
December 13, 2025*; 3:00 p.m., YouTube		vs. Illinois State; Salt Lake Slam	W 83–78	9–1	20 – Collins	8 – Clark	4 – Tied	Delta Center (2,539); Salt Lake City, UT
December 20, 2025; 12:00 p.m., CBSSN		Colorado State	W 100–58	10–1 (1–0)	18 – Falslev	8 – Elamin	6 – Allen	Dee Glen Smith Spectrum (10,270); Logan, UT
December 30, 2025; 7:00 p.m., MW Network		at Fresno State	W 72–63	11–1 (2–0)	16 – Collins	8 – Falslev	4 – Allen	Save Mart Center (4,106); Fresno, CA
January 3, 2026; 2:00 p.m., MW Network		San Jose State	W 96–78	12–1 (3–0)	23 – Collins	7 – Templin	10 – Perryman	Dee Glen Smith Spectrum (8,972); Logan, UT
January 6, 2026; 7:00 p.m., MW Network		at Air Force	W 99–62	13–1 (4–0)	20 – Collins	8 – Falslev	5 – Perryman	Clune Arena (1,027); Colorado Springs, CO
January 10, 2026; 7:00 p.m., CBSSN		at Boise State	W 93–68	14–1 (5–0)	25 – Collins	9 – Falslev	8 – Allen	ExtraMile Arena (10,651); Boise, ID
January 14, 2026; 8:00 p.m., CBSSN	No. 23	Nevada	W 71–62	15–1 (6–0)	26 – Falslev	5 – Tied	5 – Allen	Dee Glen Smith Spectrum (10,270); Logan, UT
January 17, 2026; 12:30 p.m., FS1	No. 23	at Grand Canyon	L 74–84	15–2 (6–1)	25 – Falslev	12 – Falslev	8 – Templin	Global Credit Union Arena (7,135); Phoenix, AZ
January 20, 2026; 9:00 p.m., FS1		UNLV	L 76–86	15–3 (6–2)	21 – Falslev	6 – Falslev	9 – Allen	Dee Glen Smith Spectrum (9,642); Logan, UT
January 23, 2026; 8:00 p.m., FS1		at Colorado State	W 65–61	16–3 (7–2)	20 – Collins Jr.	4 – Tied	4 – Perryman	Moby Arena (6,461); Fort Collins, CO
January 28, 2026; 7:00 p.m., CBSSN		Wyoming	W 94–62	17–3 (8–2)	20 – King	7 – King	6 – Allen	Dee Glen Smith Spectrum (10,270); Logan, UT
January 31, 2026; 11:00 a.m., CBS		San Diego State	W 71–66	18–3 (9–2)	18 – Templin	8 – Elamin	4 – Allen	Dee Glen Smith Spectrum (10,270); Logan, UT
February 4, 2026; 9:00 p.m., FS1		at New Mexico	W 86–66	19–3 (10–2)	19 – Falslev	10 – Elamin	4 – Allen	The Pit (14,419); Albuquerque, NM
February 7, 2026; 6:00 p.m., CBSSN		at Wyoming	W 85–83	20–3 (11–2)	27 – Falslev	6 – Falslev	5 – Falslev	Arena-Auditorium (3,703); Laramie, WY
February 10, 2026; 7:00 p.m., MW Network		Fresno State	W 91−78	21−3 (12−2)	16 – Perryman	8 – Templin	7 – Perryman	Dee Glen Smith Spectrum (10,270); Logan, UT
February 14, 2026*; 6:00 p.m., CBSSN		Memphis	W 99–75	22−3	24 – Collins Jr.	4 – Falslev	9 – Perryman	Dee Glen Smith Spectrum (10,270); Logan, UT
February 18, 2026; 8:30 p.m., FS1		Boise State	W 75–56	23–3 (13–2)	17 – Falslev	7 – Keller	6 – Allen	Dee Glen Smith Spectrum (10,270); Logan, UT
February 21, 2026; 8:00 p.m., FS1		at Nevada	L 77–80	23–4 (13–3)	17 – Allen	6 – King	6 – Falslev	Lawlor Events Center (11,057); Reno, NV
February 25, 2026; 9:00 p.m., FS1		at San Diego State	L 72–89	23–5 (13–4)	18 – Collins Jr.	6 – Elamin	5 – King	Viejas Arena (12,414); San Diego, CA
February 28, 2026; 8:00 p.m., FS1		Grand Canyon	W 74–69	24–5 (14–4)	15 – Tied	9 – Falslev	4 – Falslev	Dee Glen Smith Spectrum (10,270); Logan, UT
March 3, 2026; 9:00 p.m., CBSSN		at UNLV	L 65–92	24–6 (14–5)	20 – Falslev	11 – Falslev	5 – Allen	Thomas & Mack Center (5,672); Paradise, NV
March 7, 2026; 2:00 p.m., MW Network		New Mexico	W 94–90	25–6 (15–5)	27 – Collins Jr.	6 – Collins Jr.	7 – Allen	Dee Glen Smith Spectrum (10,270); Logan, UT
Mountain West tournament
March 12, 2026; 1:00 p.m., CBSSN	(1)	vs. (8) UNLV; Quarterfinal	W 80–60	26–6	24 – Falslev	9 – Falslev	5 – Allen	Thomas & Mack Center; Paradise, NV
March 13, 2026; 7:30 p.m., CBSSN	(1)	vs. (5) Nevada; Semifinal	W 79–66	27–6	15 – Elamin	9 – Allen	6 – Allen	Thomas & Mack Center; Paradise, NV
March 14, 2026; 4:00 p.m., CBS/Paramount+	(1)	vs. (2) San Diego State; Championship	W 73–62	28–6	20 – Collins Jr.	6 – Tied	6 – Falslev	Thomas & Mack Center (6,451); Paradise, NV
NCAA Tournament
March 20, 2026; 2:10 p.m., TNT	(9 W)	vs. (8 W) Villanova; First round	W 86–76	29–6	22 – Falslev	7 – Tied	6 – Allen	Viejas Arena (11,418); San Diego, CA
March 22, 2026; 5:50 p.m., truTV	(9 W)	vs. (1 W) No. 2 Arizona; Second round	L 66–78	29–7	13 – Clark	6 – Clark	3 – Tied	Viejas Arena (11,501); San Diego, CA
*Non-conference game. ^{#}Rankings from AP poll. (#) Tournament seedings in parentheses. W=West. All times are in Mountain Time.

== Rankings ==
Ranking movements Legend: ██ Increase in ranking ██ Decrease in ranking — = Not ranked RV = Received votes
	Week																				
Poll	Pre	1	2	3	4	5	6	7	8	9	10	11	12	13	14	15	16	17	18	19	Final
AP	—	RV	RV	RV	RV	—	RV	RV	RV*	RV	23	RV	RV	RV	RV	RV	RV	RV	RV	RV	RV
Coaches	—	—	—	RV	RV	RV	RV	RV	RV	RV	24	RV	RV	RV	RV	RV	RV	RV	RV	RV	RV
