= 2025–26 Grand Canyon Antelopes men's basketball team =

American college basketball season

2025–26 Grand Canyon Antelopes men's basketball
- Conference: Mountain West Conference
- Record: 20–12 (13–7 Mountain West)
- Head coach: Bryce Drew (6th season)
- Assistant coaches: Casey Shaw (6th season); Marc Rodgers (3rd season); Matt Lottich (1st season); Kam Murrell (1st season); Jordan McCabe (1st season)
- Home arena: Global Credit Union Arena (Capacity: 7,000)

2025–26 Mountain West Conference men's basketball standings
	Conf.				Overall
Team	W		L	PCT	W		L	PCT
Utah State †	15	–	5	.750	29	–	7	.806
San Diego State	14	–	6	.700	22	–	11	.667
New Mexico	13	–	7	.650	26	–	11	.703
Grand Canyon	13	–	7	.650	20	–	12	.625
Nevada	12	–	8	.600	24	–	13	.649
Boise State	12	–	8	.600	20	–	12	.625
Colorado State	11	–	9	.550	21	–	13	.618
UNLV	11	–	9	.550	18	–	17	.514
Wyoming	9	–	11	.450	18	–	15	.545
Fresno State	7	–	13	.350	13	–	19	.406
San Jose State	3	–	17	.150	9	–	24	.273
Air Force	0	–	20	.000	3	–	29	.094
† 2026 Mountain West tournament winner

The 2025–26 Grand Canyon Antelopes men's basketball team represented Grand Canyon University during the 2025–26 NCAA Division I men's basketball season. The Antelopes, led by sixth-year head coach Bryce Drew, played their home games at Global Credit Union Arena in Phoenix, Arizona as a member of the Mountain West Conference (MW).

This season marks Grand Canyon's first season as MW members after having spent 12 seasons as members of the Western Athletic Conference following their move from NCAA Division II to NCAA Division I in 2013. This move had previously been scheduled to occur on July 1, 2026, but the Mountain West Conference extended the Antelopes an offer for an immediate transition, which they accepted.

This for first time since 2022 that Grand Canyon failed to qualify for the NCAA Tournament as they were defeated by Nevada in the quarterfinals of Mountain West Conference Tournament.

== Previous season ==
The Antelopes finished the 2024–25 season 26–7, 13–3 in WAC play to finish in second place. In the WAC tournament they defeated UT Arlington and California Baptist to advance to the championship. There they defeated Utah Valley to win their third consecutive WAC Tournament championship. As a result, they received the conference's automatic bid to the NCAA tournament as the No. 13 in the West region. There they lost to Maryland.

== Offseason ==
=== Departures ===
Name	Number	Pos.	Height	Weight	Year	Hometown	Reason for departure
Ray Harrison	0	G	6'4"	190	Senior	Greenville, SC	Out of eligibility
Styles Phipps	1	G	6'2"	190	Freshman	Avondale, AZ	Transferred to Pepperdine
Lök Wur	5	F	6'9"	215	Graduate	Fremont, CA	Out of eligibility
Malcolm Flaggs	6	G	6'6"	200	(redshirt) Sophomore	Tuba City, AZ	Transferred to Villanova
Tyon Grant-Foster	7	F	6'7"	220	Graduate	Kansas City, KS	Transferred to Gonzaga
Collin Moore	8	G	6'4"	210	Senior	North Little Rock, AR	Declared for NBA Draft
Traivar Jackson	9	F	6'6"	210	Senior	Anchorage, AK	Transferred to Northern Arizona
Jason Amador	12	F	6'0"	195	Graduate	Parker, AZ	Out of eligibility
JaKobe Coles	21	F	6'8"	230	Senior	Denton, TX	Entered transfer portal
Sammie Yeanay	23	F	6'8"	240	Freshman	Gainesville, FL	Transferred to California
Duke Brennan	24	F	6'10"	250	Junior	Chandler, AZ	Transferred to Villanova
Austin Maurer	34	C	7'0"	225	Freshman	Medford, OR	Transferred to Seattle U

=== Incoming transfers ===
Name	Number	Pos.	Height	Weight	Year	Hometown	Previous college
Makaih Williams	2	G	6'2"	190	Junior	Long Beach, CA	UT Arlington
Brian Moore Jr.	5	G	6'2"	190	Graduate	Harlem, NY	Norfolk State
Dusty Stromer	8	F	6'6"	195	Junior	Sherman Oaks, CA	Gonzaga
Jaden Henley	10	F	6'7"	210	Senior	Ontario, CA	UNLV
Caleb Shaw	11	F	6'6"	215	(redshirt) Junior	Phoenix, AZ	Northern Colorado
Dennis Evans	14	C	7'2"	240	(redshirt) Freshman	Riverside, CA	Louisville
Jack Sawyer	21	F	6'8"	230	Sophomore	Aledo, TX	Abilene Christian
Kaleb Smith	22	F	6'10"	245	(redshirt) Junior	Rancho Cucamonga, CA	UC Riverside
Nana Owusu-Anane	31	F	6'8"	240	Graduate	Burlington, ON, Canada	Brown
Wilhelm Breidenbach	32	F	6'10"	235	Graduate	Rancho Santa Margarita, CA	Washington

== Roster ==
2025–26 Grand Canyon Antelopes men's basketball team
Players
Coaches

Pos.	#	Name	Height	Weight	Year	Previous school	Hometown
G	1	Luke Shaw	6 ft 3 in (1.91 m)	185 lb (84 kg)	Fr	Valley Christian HS	Phoenix, Arizona
G	2	Makaih Williams	6 ft 2 in (1.88 m)	190 lb (86 kg)	Jr	UT Arlington	Long Beach, California
G/F	3	Braylon Johnson	6 ft 7 in (2.01 m)	210 lb (95 kg)	RS Fr	Pinnacle HS	Moon Township, Pennsylvania
G	5	Brian Moore Jr.	6 ft 2 in (1.88 m)	190 lb (86 kg)	GS	Norfolk State	Harlem, New York
G	8	Dusty Stromer	6 ft 6 in (1.98 m)	195 lb (88 kg)	Jr	Gonzaga	Sherman Oaks, California
G	9	Evan Boisdur	6 ft 1 in (1.85 m)	175 lb (79 kg)	Fr	BCM Gravelines-Dunkerque	Les Abymes, France
G	10	Jaden Henley	6 ft 7 in (2.01 m)	210 lb (95 kg)	Sr	UNLV	Ontario, California
G	11	Caleb Shaw	6 ft 6 in (1.98 m)	215 lb (98 kg)	RS Jr	Northern Colorado	Phoenix, Arizona
C	14	Dennis Evans	7 ft 2 in (2.18 m)	240 lb (109 kg)	RS Fr	Louisville	Riverside, California
C	17	Efe Demirel	7 ft 1 in (2.16 m)	240 lb (109 kg)	Fr	Pinar Karsiyaka	İzmit, Turkey
F	21	Jack Sawyer	6 ft 8 in (2.03 m)	230 lb (104 kg)	So	Abilene Christian	Aledo, Texas
F	22	Kaleb Smith	6 ft 10 in (2.08 m)	245 lb (111 kg)	RS Jr	UC Riverside	Rancho Cucamonga, California
G	23	Cole Pepe	6 ft 4 in (1.93 m)	190 lb (86 kg)	Fr	Notre Dame Prep HS	Scottsdale, Arizona
F	31	Nana Owusu-Anane	6 ft 8 in (2.03 m)	240 lb (109 kg)	GS	Brown	Burlington, ON, Canada
F	32	Wilhelm Breidenbach	6 ft 10 in (2.08 m)	235 lb (107 kg)	GS	Washington	Rancho Santa Margarita, California

Head coach

- Bryce Drew (Valparaiso)

Assistant coach(es)

- Casey Shaw (Toledo)
- Marc Rodgers (Central Washington)
- Matt Lottich (Stanford)
- Kam Murrell (St. Thomas Aquinas)
- Jordan McCabe (UNLV)

Legend

- (C) Team captain
- (S) Suspended
- (I) Ineligible
- (W) Walk-on
- Injured
- Current redshirt

Roster
Last update: 2025-10-20

== Schedule and results ==
Date time, TV	Rank^{#}	Opponent^{#}	Result	Record	High points	High rebounds	High assists	Site (attendance) city, state
Exhibition
October 10, 2025*; 2:00 p.m.		at Baylor	L 74–79		28 – Henley	8 – Owusu-Anane	4 – Stromer	Foster Pavilion (-); Waco, TX
October 25, 2025*; 6:30 p.m., KTVK/MW Network		USC	L 61–67		14 – Stromer	16 – Owusu-Anane	2 – Tied	Global Credit Union Arena (7,379); Phoenix, AZ
Regular season
November 3, 2025*; 7:00 p.m., AZFS/MW Network		Purdue Fort Wayne	W 90–71	1–0	17 – Tied	9 – Owusu-Anane	5 – Tied	Global Credit Union Arena (7,073); Phoenix, AZ
November 7, 2025*; 7:00 p.m., AZFS/MW Network		Youngstown State	L 81–90	1–1	19 – Tied	12 – Owusu-Anane	3 – Tied	Global Credit Union Arena (7,142); Phoenix, AZ
November 10, 2025*; 7:00 p.m., KTVK/MW Network		Northern Illinois	W 88–59	2–1	16 – Breidenbach	11 – Owusu-Anane	7 – Owusu-Anane	Global Credit Union Arena (7,008); Phoenix, AZ
November 15, 2025*; 6:00 p.m., ESPN+		at Saint Louis	L 64–78	2–2	20 – Williams	11 – Owusu-Anane	2 – Tied	Chaifetz Arena (6,105); St. Louis, MO
November 21, 2025*; 7:00 p.m., KTVK/MW Network		Northwestern State; Acrisure Series on-campus game	W 85–72	3–2	22 – Henley	12 – Owusu-Anane	4 – Henley	Global Credit Union Arena (7,224); Phoenix, AZ
November 25, 2025*; 10:00 p.m., CBSSN		vs. Utah; Acrisure Classic semifinal	W 68–58	4–2	18 – Henley	9 – Owusu-Anane	3 – Tied	Acrisure Arena; Thousand Palms, CA
November 26, 2025*; 7:30 p.m., CBSSN		vs. Iowa; Acrisure Classic championship game	L 46–59	4–3	16 – Henley	6 – Demirel	2 – Tied	Acrisure Arena; Thousand Palms, CA
December 2, 2025*; 7:00 p.m., AZFS/MW Network		Stetson	W 67–45	5–3	26 – Henley	15 – Owusu-Anane	5 – Henley	Global Credit Union Arena (6,703); Phoenix, AZ
December 6, 2025*; 5:30 p.m., CBSSN		vs. Oklahoma State; Jerry Colangelo Classic	L 78–84	5–4	22 – Demirel	8 – Demirel	5 – Williams	Mortgage Matchup Center; Phoenix, AZ
December 13, 2025*; 6:00 p.m., KTVK/MW Network		Coastal Carolina	W 82–61	6–4	18 – C. Shaw	8 – Breidenbach	5 – Williams	Global Credit Union Arena (7,102); Phoenix, AZ
December 20, 2025; 2:00 p.m., MW Network		at Wyoming	W 82–70	7–4 (1–0)	20 – Williams	7 – Breidenbach	3 – Owusu-Anane	Arena-Auditorium (3,853); Laramie, WY
December 22, 2025*; 6:00 p.m., AZFS/MW Network		IU Indy	W 91–78	8–4	29 – Henley	8 – Tied	3 – Moore Jr.	Global Credit Union Arena (7,291); Phoenix, AZ
January 3, 2025; 6:00 p.m., KTVK/AZFS/MWN		Colorado State	L 60–70	8–5 (1–1)	22 – Williams	7 – Owusu-Anane	4 – Henley	Global Credit Union Arena (7,332); Phoenix, AZ
January 7, 2026; 9:00 p.m., FS1		at Boise State	W 75–58	9–5 (2–1)	22 – Henley	8 – Tied	3 – Tied	ExtraMile Arena (8,806); Boise, ID
January 10, 2026; 6:00 p.m., KTVK/AZFS/MWN		San Jose State	W 76–58	10–5 (3–1)	14 – Demirel	11 – Owusu-Arane	5 – Williams	Global Credit Union Arena (7,003); Phoenix, AZ
January 13, 2026; 7:00 p.m., MW Network		at New Mexico	L 64–87	10–6 (3–2)	17 – Henley	6 – Henley	2 – Tied	The Pit (12,512); Albuquerque, NM
January 17, 2026; 12:30 p.m., FS1		No. 23 Utah State	W 84–74	11–6 (4–2)	20 – Tied	11 – Owusu-Anane	4 – Moore Jr.	Global Credit Union Arena (7,135); Phoenix, AZ
January 21, 2026; 9:00 p.m., FS1		San Diego State	W 70–69	12–6 (5–2)	17 – Tied	7 – Tied	3 – Tied	Global Credit Union Arena (7,179); Phoenix, AZ
January 24, 2026; 6:30 p.m., MW Network		at Fresno State	W 68–57	13–6 (6–2)	23 – Henley	12 – Owusu-Anane	3 – Henley	Save Mart Center (6,462); Fresno, CA
January 27, 2026; 8:30 p.m., FS1		at Nevada	L 60–66 ^{OT}	13–7 (6–3)	16 – Henley	13 – Henley	3 – Stromer	Lawlor Events Center (8,728); Reno, NV
January 30, 2026; 7:00 p.m., FS1		Boise State	W 86–69	14–7 (7–3)	20 – Henley	7 – Owusu-Anane	6 – Henley	Global Credit Union Arena (7,391); Phoenix, AZ
February 3, 2026; 7:00 p.m., KTVK/MW Network		Air Force	W 81–57	15–7 (8–3)	15 – Tied	7 – Owusu-Anane	6 – Henley	Global Credit Union Arena (6,707); Phoenix, AZ
February 7, 2026; 2:30 p.m., FOX		at UNLV	L 78–80	15–8 (8–4)	19 – Owusu-Anane	13 – Owusu-Anane	5 – Moore Jr.	Thomas & Mack Center (6,639); Paradise, NV
February 11, 2026; 8:00 p.m., FS1		New Mexico	L 64–70	15–9 (8–5)	20 – Williams	10 – Owusu-Anane	2 – Tied	Global Credit Union Arena (6,988); Phoenix, AZ
February 14, 2026; 3:00 p.m., MW Network		at San Jose State	W 94–79	16–9 (9–5)	24 – Henley	8 – Williams	8 – Henley	Provident Credit Union Event Center (2,119); San Jose, CA
February 17, 2026; 8:00 p.m., CBSSN		at San Diego State	W 73–63	17–9 (10–5)	21 – Henley	11 – Demirel	3 – Tied	Viejas Arena (12,414); San Diego, CA
February 21, 2026; 6:00 p.m., KTVK/AZFS/MWN		Wyoming	L 65–70	17–10 (10–6)	29 – Williams	12 – Owusu-Anane	5 – Henley	Global Credit Union Arena (7,315); Phoenix, AZ
February 25, 2026; 7:00 p.m., CBSSN		UNLV	W 80–67	18–10 (11–6)	28 – Henley	11 – Tied	4 – Williams	Global Credit Union Arena (6,803); Phoenix, AZ
February 28, 2026; 8:00 p.m., FS1		at Utah State	L 69–74	18–11 (11–7)	22 – Henley	7 – Tied	6 – Williams	Smith Spectrum (10,270); Logan, UT
March 3, 2026; 7:00 p.m., MW Network		at Air Force	W 86–60	19–11 (12–7)	17 – Henley	7 – Owusu-Anane	4 – Tied	Clune Arena (2,002); Colorado Springs, CO
March 7, 2026; 6:00 p.m., KTVK/MW Network		Fresno State	W 85–60	20–11 (13–7)	18 – Moore Jr.	7 – Demirel	5 – Tied	Global Credit Union Arena (7,233); Phoenix, AZ
Mountain West tournament
March 12, 2026; 3:30 p.m., CBSSN	(4)	vs. (5) Nevada; Quarterfinal	L 80–84	20–12	25 – Williams	9 – Owusu-Anane	4 – Williams	Thomas & Mack Center (6,911); Paradise, NV
*Non-conference game. ^{#}Rankings from AP Poll. (#) Tournament seedings in parentheses. All times are in Mountain Time.
