= 2025–26 Air Force Falcons men's basketball team =

American college basketball season

2025–26 Air Force Falcons men's basketball
- Conference: Mountain West Conference
- Record: 3–29 (0–20 MW)
- Head coach: Joe Scott (6th, 10th season overall) (until January 17); Jon Jordan (1st season, interim)
- Associate head coach: David Metzendorf (6th season)
- Assistant coaches: Eamonn Kearney (1st season); Lawrence Rowley (1st season); Capt. Sid Tomes (1st season); Dennis Harrington (1st season)
- Home arena: Clune Arena (Capacity: 5,508)

2025–26 Mountain West Conference men's basketball standings
	Conf.				Overall
Team	W		L	PCT	W		L	PCT
Utah State †	15	–	5	.750	29	–	7	.806
San Diego State	14	–	6	.700	22	–	11	.667
New Mexico	13	–	7	.650	26	–	11	.703
Grand Canyon	13	–	7	.650	20	–	12	.625
Nevada	12	–	8	.600	24	–	13	.649
Boise State	12	–	8	.600	20	–	12	.625
Colorado State	11	–	9	.550	21	–	13	.618
UNLV	11	–	9	.550	18	–	17	.514
Wyoming	9	–	11	.450	18	–	15	.545
Fresno State	7	–	13	.350	13	–	19	.406
San Jose State	3	–	17	.150	9	–	24	.273
Air Force	0	–	20	.000	3	–	29	.094
† 2026 Mountain West tournament winner

The 2025–26 Air Force Falcons men's basketball team represented the United States Air Force Academy during the 2025–26 NCAA Division I men's basketball season. The Falcons were led by sixth-year head coach Joe Scott for the first 17 games of the season and by interim head coach Jon Jordan for the remainder of the season. They played their home games at Clune Arena in Colorado Springs, Colorado as members of the Mountain West Conference. They finished the season 3–29, 0–20 in MWC play to finish in last place. They lost to Nevada in the first round of the MWC tournament.

Head coach Joe Scott was suspended on January 17, 2026 pending an investigation into his treatment of players. On February 20, the school announced that Scott had been fired. On March 18, the school named Penn State assistant Joe Crispin the team's new head coach.

== Previous season ==
The Falcons finished the 2025–26 season 4–28, 1–19 in Mountain West play to finish last in the conference. As the 11-seed in the Mountain West Tournament they were defeated by 6-seed UNLV 59–68 in the First Round to end their season.

== Offseason ==
=== Departures ===
Name	Number	Pos.	Height	Weight	Year	Hometown	Reason for departure
Sam Akinrelere	1	G	6'3"	220	Sophomore	Houston, TX	Departed program
Luke Kearney	3	F	6'7"	215	Sophomore	Phoenix, AZ	Transferred to Utah State
Wyatt Boeker	4	F	6'8"	205	Sophomore	Tomball, TX	Departed program
Ethan Taylor	5	G	6'5"	205	Senior	Houston, TX	Out of eligibility
Will Cooper	6	F	6'6"	210	Freshman	Omaha, NE	Transferred to Nebraska
Christian Umaña	9	G	6'6"	205	Freshman	League City, TX	Entered transfer portal
Byron Brown	11	G	6'5"	210	Senior	Sahuarita, AZ	Out of eligibility
Miles Clark	12	F	6'7"	197	Freshman	Seattle, WA	Departed program
Chase Beasley	13	G/F	6'7"	195	Senior	Fort Washington, MD	Out of eligibility
Beau Becker	14	F	6'6"	210	Senior	Dallas, TX	Out of eligibility
Yoda Oke	20	G	6'4"	195	Freshman	Fullerton, CA	Entered transfer portal
Sam Springer	22	F	6'7"	215	Freshman	Cleveland, OH	Transferred to Loyola (Maryland)
Sam Duskin	23	G	6'4"	180	Freshman	Cullman, AL	Transferred to Montevallo
Jeffrey Mills	24	G	6'4"	200	Senior	Flower Mound, TX	Out of eligibility

=== Incoming transfers ===
Name	Number	Pos.	Height	Weight	Year	Hometown	Previous college
None

=== 2025 recruiting class ===
College recruiting information
Name	Hometown	School	Height	Weight	Commit date
Chris Catchings; G	Houston, TX	USAFA Prep	6 ft 4 in (1.93 m)	210 lb (95 kg)	Oct 11, 2023
Chris Catchings; G	Recruit ratings: No ratings found				
Riley Dering; F	Dallas, TX	Highland Park HS	6 ft 9 in (2.06 m)	230 lb (100 kg)	Nov 11, 2024
Riley Dering; F	Recruit ratings: No ratings found				
Keaton Frisch; F	Waunakee, WI	USAFA Prep	6 ft 6 in (1.98 m)	195 lb (88 kg)	Mar 7, 2024
Keaton Frisch; F	Recruit ratings: No ratings found				
Ethan Greenberg; G	Centerville, OH	Centerville HS	6 ft 4 in (1.93 m)	195 lb (88 kg)	Nov 13, 2024
Ethan Greenberg; G	Recruit ratings: No ratings found				
Justin Hinds; G	Wilmington, DE	USAFA Prep	6 ft 5 in (1.96 m)	200 lb (91 kg)	May 13, 2024
Justin Hinds; G	Recruit ratings: No ratings found				
Lucas Hobin; F	Katy, TX	Strake Jesuit College Prep	6 ft 8 in (2.03 m)	205 lb (93 kg)	Oct 11, 2024
Lucas Hobin; F	Recruit ratings: No ratings found				
Sam Imade; G	Cincinnati, OH	Sycamore HS	6 ft 7 in (2.01 m)	200 lb (91 kg)	Feb 5, 2025
Sam Imade; G	Recruit ratings: No ratings found				
Brendan Martin; F	Huntsville, AL	USAFA Prep	6 ft 6 in (1.98 m)	195 lb (88 kg)	Nov 15, 2023
Brendan Martin; F	Recruit ratings: No ratings found				
Kam Sanders; G	Albany, GA	Lee County HS	6 ft 3 in (1.91 m)	195 lb (88 kg)	Nov 20, 2024
Kam Sanders; G	Recruit ratings: No ratings found				
Overall recruit ranking: Scout: – Rivals: –
Note: In many cases, Scout, Rivals, 247Sports, On3, and ESPN may conflict in their listings of height and weight.; In these cases, the average was taken. ESPN grades are on a 100-point scale.; Sources: "2025 Air Force Basketball Recruiting Commits". Scout.; "Scout.com Team Recruiting Rankings". Scout.; "2025 Team Ranking". Rivals.

== Roster ==
2025–26 Air Force Falcons men's basketball team
Players
Coaches

Pos.	#	Name	Height	Weight	Year	Previous school	Hometown
F	0	Josh Gatete	6 ft 9 in (2.06 m)	195 lb (88 kg)	Jr	Penn HS	Granger, Indiana
G	2	A.J. Patterson	6 ft 3 in (1.91 m)	200 lb (91 kg)	So	USAFA Prep	Atlanta, Georgia
G	3	Kam Sanders	6 ft 3 in (1.91 m)	195 lb (88 kg)	Fr	Lee County HS	Albany, Georgia
F	5	Riley Dering	6 ft 9 in (2.06 m)	230 lb (104 kg)	Fr	Highland Park HS	Dallas, Texas
G	7	Elliott Taite	6 ft 4 in (1.93 m)	200 lb (91 kg)	So	USAFA Prep	Frisco, Texas
F	8	Keaton Frisch	6 ft 6 in (1.98 m)	195 lb (88 kg)	Fr	USAFA Prep	Waunakee, Wisconsin
F	10	Caleb Walker	6 ft 9 in (2.06 m)	250 lb (113 kg)	Jr	USAFA Prep	Jefferson City, Missouri
F	11	Brendan Martin	6 ft 6 in (1.98 m)	195 lb (88 kg)	Fr	USAFA Prep	Huntsville, Alabama
G	15	Justin Hinds	6 ft 5 in (1.96 m)	200 lb (91 kg)	Fr	USAFA Prep	Wilmington, Delaware
G	21	Ethan Greenberg	6 ft 4 in (1.93 m)	195 lb (88 kg)	Fr	Centerville HS	Centerville, Ohio
F	24	Lucas Hobin	6 ft 8 in (2.03 m)	205 lb (93 kg)	Fr	Strake Jesuit Prep	Katy, Texas
G	25	Chris Catchings	6 ft 4 in (1.93 m)	210 lb (95 kg)	Fr	USAFA Prep	Houston, Texas
G	30	Eli Robinson	6 ft 6 in (1.98 m)	215 lb (98 kg)	So	USAFA Prep	Monument, Colorado
F	32	Kolby Gilles	6 ft 5 in (1.96 m)	240 lb (109 kg)	Jr	USAFA Prep	Chicago, Illinois
F	33	Sam Imade	6 ft 7 in (2.01 m)	200 lb (91 kg)	Fr	Sycamore HS	Cincinnati, Ohio
G	35	Kyle Marshall	6 ft 4 in (1.93 m)	190 lb (86 kg)	So	USAFA Prep	Oyster Bay, New York
C	51	Wesley Celichowski	7 ft 0 in (2.13 m)	255 lb (116 kg)	Jr	USAFA Prep	Georgetown, Indiana

Head coach

- Joe Scott (Princeton)

Assistant coach(es)

- David Metzendorf (Ithaca)
- Eamonn Kennedy (Drew)
- Lawrence Rowley (Emory)
- Capt. Sid Tomes (Air Force)
- Dennis Harrington (Marquette)

Legend

- (C) Team captain
- (S) Suspended
- (I) Ineligible
- (W) Walk-on
- Injured
- Current redshirt

Roster
Last update: 2025-10-26

== Schedule and results ==
Date time, TV	Rank^{#}	Opponent^{#}	Result	Record	High points	High rebounds	High assists	Site (attendance) city, state
Non-conference regular season
November 3, 2025*; 5:30 p.m., ESPN+		at Belmont	L 63–79	0–1	18 – Sanders	7 – Robinson	7 – Sanders	Curb Event Center (1,715); Nashville, TN
November 8, 2025*; 2:00 p.m., MW Network		Austin Peay	L 54–74	0–2	21 – Greenberg	10 – Robinson	3 – Gatete	Clune Arena (1,374); Colorado Springs, CO
November 11, 2025*; 2:00 p.m., MW Network		LIU	L 72–76	0–3	18 – Sanders	7 – Robinson	7 – Marshall	Clune Arena (1,089); Colorado Springs, CO
November 15, 2025*; 12:00 p.m., MW Network		Miami (OH)	L 61–76	0–4	17 – Walker	8 – Walker	5 – Robinson	Clune Arena (1,117); Colorado Springs, CO
November 19, 2025*; 4:00 p.m., Altitude/MW Network		Alabama State	W 66–64	1–4	20 – Hobin	12 – Walker	6 – Sanders	Clune Arena (1,025); Colorado Springs, CO
November 21, 2025*; 4:00 p.m., MW Network		SIU Edwardsville; Air Force Classic	W 77–63	2–4	17 – Robinson	10 – Robinson	5 – Sanders	Clune Arena (1,305); Colorado Springs, CO
November 23, 2025*; 3:00 p.m., MW Network		IU Indy; Air Force Classic	W 98–85	3–4	27 – Hobin	9 – Robinson	8 – Robinson	Clune Arena (1,099); Colorado Springs, CO
November 26, 2025*; 4:00 p.m., Altitude/MW Network		Northern Colorado	L 53–71	3–5	16 – Sanders	6 – Patterson	3 – Robinson	Clune Arena (1,391); Colorado Springs, CO
November 29, 2025*; 1:00 p.m., CBSSN		vs. South Dakota	L 63–80	3–6	21 – Walker	5 – Robinson	3 – Tied	The Monument (2,348); Rapid City, SD
December 3, 2025*; 7:00 p.m., MW Network		Pacific	L 65–80	3–7	19 – Hobin	5 – Gilles	3 – Greenberg	Clune Arena (885); Colorado Springs, CO
December 7, 2025*; 10:00 a.m., CBSSN		at Navy	L 56–61	3–8	15 – Sanders	7 – Hobin	3 – Tied	Alumni Hall; Annapolis, MD
Mountain West regular season
December 17, 2025; 9:00 p.m., CBSSN		at San Diego State	L 58–81	3–9 (0–1)	13 – Sanders	6 – Robinson	4 – Sanders	Viejas Arena (10,727); San Diego, CA
December 30, 2025; 2:00 p.m., MW Network		Wyoming	L 56–68	3–10 (0–2)	17 – Walker	5 – Tied	2 – Tied	Clune Arena (1,835); Colorado Springs, CO
January 3, 2026; 3:00 p.m., MW Network		at UNLV	L 39–67	3–11 (0–3)	11 – Hobin	7 – Walker	2 – Tied	Thomas & Mack Center (6,321); Las Vegas, NV
January 6, 2026; 7:00 p.m., MW Network		Utah State	L 62–99	3–12 (0–4)	12 – Walker	6 – Walker	3 – Tied	Clune Arena (1,027); Colorado Springs, CO
January 10, 2026; 1:00 p.m., MW Network		New Mexico	L 49–91	3–13 (0–5)	13 – Sanders	7 – Walker	3 – Patterson	Clune Arena (2,017); Colorado Springs, CO
January 13, 2026; 8:00 p.m., MW Network		at San Jose State	L 62–70	3–14 (0–6)	16 – Hobin	6 – Sanders	5 – Sanders	Provident Credit Union Event Center (1,271); San Jose, CA
January 17, 2026; 2:00 p.m., MW Network		Nevada	L 66–81	3–15 (0–7)	22 – Hobin	4 – Hobin	6 – Sanders	Clune Arena (964); Colorado Springs, CO
January 20, 2026; 7:00 p.m., MW Network		at Colorado State	L 52–81	3–16 (0–8)	11 – Sanders	10 – Robinson	2 – Tied	Moby Arena (4,318); Fort Collins, CO
January 24, 2026; 2:00 p.m., MW Network		at Boise State	L 54–96	3–17 (0–9)	10 – Sanders	4 – Tied	2 – Tied	ExtraMile Arena (10,484); Boise, ID
January 31, 2026; 1:00 p.m., MW Network		Fresno State	L 62–79	3–18 (0–10)	11 – Greenberg	6 – Tied	3 – Gilles	Clune Arena (1,437); Colorado Springs, CO
February 3, 2026; 7:00 p.m., MW Network		at Grand Canyon	L 57–81	3–19 (0–11)	15 – Dering	5 – Tied	5 – Sanders	Global Credit Union Arena (6,707); Phoenix, AZ
February 7, 2026; 6:00 p.m., FS1		San Diego State	L 54–88	3–20 (0–12)	11 – Tied	5 – Tied	5 – Celichowski	Clune Arena (1,741); Colorado Springs, CO
February 10, 2026; 7:00 p.m., MW Network		Colorado State	L 74–91	3–21 (0–13)	17 – Tied	8 – Robinson	6 – Sanders	Clune Arena (2,218); Colorado Springs, CO
February 14, 2026; 3:00 p.m., MW Network		at Fresno State	L 63–93	3–22 (0–14)	26 – Hobin	8 – Walker	11 – Sanders	Save Mart Center (4,244); Fresno, CA
February 17, 2026; 7:00 p.m., MW Network		at New Mexico	L 61–98	3–23 (0–15)	13 – Sanders	5 – Sanders	2 – Tied	The Pit (12,291); Albuquerque, NM
February 21, 2026; 1:00 p.m., MW Network		UNLV	L 66–91	3–24 (0–16)	19 – Hobin	8 – Sanders	9 – Sanders	Clune Arena (1,519); Colorado Springs, CO
February 24, 2026; 7:00 p.m., MW Network		San Jose State	L 80−86	3−25 (0−17)	21 – Hobin	8 – Robinson	6 – Patterson	Clune Arena (851); Colorado Springs, CO
February 28, 2026; 2:00 p.m., MW Network		at Wyoming	L 62–66	3−26 (0−18)	16 – Sanders	9 – Sanders	5 – Sanders	Arena-Auditorium (4,422); Laramie, WY
March 3, 2026; 7:00 p.m., MW Network		Grand Canyon	L 60–86	3−27 (0−19)	18 – Sanders	6 – Tied	5 – Sanders	Clune Arena (2,002); Colorado Springs, CO
March 7, 2026; 8:00 p.m., MW Network		at Nevada	L 59–74	3−28 (0−20)	14 – Sanders	6 – Walker	3 – Sanders	Lawlor Events Center (10,435); Reno, NV
Mountain West tournament
March 11, 2026; 3:30 p.m., MW Network	(12)	vs. (5) Nevada; First Round	L 45–80	3–29	12 – Sanders	5 – Robinson	4 – Patterson	Thomas & Mack Center (2,770); Las Vegas, NV
*Non-conference game. ^{#}Rankings from AP Poll. (#) Tournament seedings in parentheses. All times are in Mountain Time.
