= 2025–26 Wyoming Cowboys basketball team =

American college basketball season

2025–26 Wyoming Cowboys basketball

NIT, First round
- Conference: Mountain West Conference
- Record: 18–15 (9–11 MW)
- Head coach: Sundance Wicks (2nd season)
- Assistant coaches: Will Martin (2nd season); Chris McMillian (1st season); Nic Reynolds (2nd season); Chris Thomas (1st season); Nick Whitmore (3rd season)
- Home arena: Arena-Auditorium (Capacity: 11,612)

2025–26 Mountain West Conference men's basketball standings
	Conf.				Overall
Team	W		L	PCT	W		L	PCT
Utah State †	15	–	5	.750	29	–	7	.806
San Diego State	14	–	6	.700	22	–	11	.667
New Mexico	13	–	7	.650	26	–	11	.703
Grand Canyon	13	–	7	.650	20	–	12	.625
Nevada	12	–	8	.600	24	–	13	.649
Boise State	12	–	8	.600	20	–	12	.625
Colorado State	11	–	9	.550	21	–	13	.618
UNLV	11	–	9	.550	18	–	17	.514
Wyoming	9	–	11	.450	18	–	15	.545
Fresno State	7	–	13	.350	13	–	19	.406
San Jose State	3	–	17	.150	9	–	24	.273
Air Force	0	–	20	.000	3	–	29	.094
† 2026 Mountain West tournament winner

The 2025–26 Wyoming Cowboys basketball team represented the University of Wyoming during the 2025–26 NCAA Division I men's basketball season. The Cowboys were led by second-year head coach Sundance Wicks and played their home games at Arena-Auditorium in Laramie, Wyoming as a member of the Mountain West Conference.

== Previous season ==
The Cowboys finished the 2024-25 season 12–20, 5–15 in Mountain West play to finish in ninth place. In the first round of the Mountain West tournament, they lost to San Jose State.

== Offseason ==
=== Departures ===
Name	Number	Pos.	Height	Weight	Year	Hometown	Reason for departure
Nigle Cook	1	G	6'6"	176	(redshirt) Freshman	DeLand, FL	Transferred to Northwest Florida State College
Kobe Newton	2	G	6'2"	178	Senior	Portland, OR	Out of eligibility
A.J. Wills	3	G	6'2"	160	Sophomore	Richmond, VA	Transferred to Hofstra
Obi Agbim	5	G	6'3"	180	Senior	Aurora, CO	Transferred to Baylor
Cole Henry	8	F	6'9"	240	Senior	Oskaloosa, IA	Out of eligibility
Levi Brown	10	G	6'0"	167	(redshirt) Freshman	Laramie, WY	Transferred to Casper College
Dontaie Allen	11	G	6'6"	210	Senior	Falmouth, KY	Out of eligibility
Scottie Ebube	12	C	6'10"	275	Junior	Mundelein, IL	Transferred to NC State
Oleg Kojenets	15	F	7'0"	228	Junior	Kaunas, Lithuania	Transferred to Stony Brook
Jordan Nesbitt	16	G	6'6"	210	Senior	St. Louis, MO	Out of eligibility
Jehvion Starwood	22	G	6'3"	180	Freshman	Oswego, IL	Departed program
Touko Tainamo	25	F	6'9"	220	Senior	Helsinki, Finland	Out of eligibility
Cort Roberson	31	G	6'0"	160	Junior	Arlington, WA	Departed program

=== Incoming transfers ===
Name	Number	Pos.	Height	Weight	Year	Hometown	Previous college
Uriyah Rojas	0	G	6'3"	206	Junior	Rancho Cucamonga, CA	Chaffey College
Damarion Dennis	1	G	6'1"	166	Sophomore	San Antonio, TX	Texas A&M-Corpus Christi
Khaden Bennett	3	G	6'4"	205	Junior	St. Louis, MO	Quinnipiac
Leland Walker	5	G	6'1"	181	Senior	Indianapolis, IN	Florida Atlantic
Kiani Saxon	8	F	6'8"	226	Graduate	Auckland, New Zealand	Missouri Western
Jared Harris	9	G	6'2"	186	Sophomore	Silsbee, TX	Memphis
Adam Harakow	13	G/F	6'7"	218	Junior	Edmonton, AB, Canada	Lake Superior State

=== Recruiting class ===
College recruiting information
Name	Hometown	School	Height	Weight	Commit date
Gavin Gores; PF	Cumberland, WI	Cumberland HS	6 ft 8 in (2.03 m)	210 lb (95 kg)	Nov 13, 2024
Gavin Gores; PF	Recruit ratings: Scout: Rivals: 247Sports: ESPN:				
Nasir Meyer; CG	Agouras Hills, CA	New Hampton School	6 ft 7 in (2.01 m)	185 lb (84 kg)	Nov 14, 2024
Nasir Meyer; CG	Recruit ratings: Scout: Rivals: 247Sports: ESPN:				
Simm-Martin Saadi; PF	Helsinki, Finland	Sunrise Christian Academy	6 ft 9 in (2.06 m)	N/A	May 9, 2024
Simm-Martin Saadi; PF	Recruit ratings: Scout: Rivals: 247Sports: ESPN:				
Neil Summers; PF	Laramie, WY	Laramie HS	6 ft 9 in (2.06 m)	240 lb (110 kg)	Nov 13, 2024
Neil Summers; PF	Recruit ratings: Scout: Rivals: 247Sports: ESPN:				
Talan Taylor; CG	Idaho Falls, ID	Hillcrest, HS	6 ft 3 in (1.91 m)	N/A	Jul 26, 2025
Talan Taylor; CG	Recruit ratings: Scout: Rivals: 247Sports: ESPN:				
Overall recruit ranking: Scout: – Rivals: –
Note: In many cases, Scout, Rivals, 247Sports, On3, and ESPN may conflict in their listings of height and weight.; In these cases, the average was taken. ESPN grades are on a 100-point scale.; Sources: "2025 Wyoming Basketball Recruiting Commits". Scout.; "Scout.com Team Recruiting Rankings". Scout.; "2025 Team Ranking". Rivals.

== Roster ==
2025–26 Wyoming Cowboys men's basketball team
Players
Coaches

Pos.	#	Name	Height	Weight	Year	Previous school	Hometown
G	0	Uriyah Rojas	6 ft 3 in (1.91 m)	206 lb (93 kg)	Jr	Chaffey College	Rancho Cucamonga, California
G	1	Damarion Dennis	6 ft 1 in (1.85 m)	166 lb (75 kg)	So	Texas A&M-Corpus Christi	San Antonio, Texas
G	2	Nasir Meyer	6 ft 7 in (2.01 m)	194 lb (88 kg)	Fr	New Hampton School	Los Angeles, California
G	3	Khaden Bennett	6 ft 4 in (1.93 m)	205 lb (93 kg)	Jr	Quinnipiac	Mansfield, Texas
G	5	Leland Walker	6 ft 1 in (1.85 m)	181 lb (82 kg)	Sr	Florida Atlantic	Indianapolis, Indiana
F	7	Matija Belić	6 ft 7 in (2.01 m)	239 lb (108 kg)	Sr	UC Santa Barbara	Belgrade, Serbia
F	8	Kiani Saxon	6 ft 8 in (2.03 m)	226 lb (103 kg)	GS	Missouri Western	Auckland, New Zealand
G	9	Jared Harris	6 ft 2 in (1.88 m)	186 lb (84 kg)	So	Memphis	Silsbee, Texas
F	10	Abou Magassa	6 ft 7 in (2.01 m)	217 lb (98 kg)	So	Saint Louis	Morsang-sur-Orge, France
F	11	Gavin Gores	6 ft 10 in (2.08 m)	224 lb (102 kg)	Fr	Cumberland HS	Cumberland, Wisconsin
G/F	13	Adam Harakow	6 ft 7 in (2.01 m)	218 lb (99 kg)	Jr	Lake Superior State	Edmonton, Alberta, Canada
G/F	14	Garrett Spielman (W)	6 ft 7 in (2.01 m)	201 lb (91 kg)	RS Fr	Sheridan HS	Sheridan, Wyoming
G	32	Talan Taylor (W)	6 ft 4 in (1.93 m)	158 lb (72 kg)	Fr	Hillcrest HS	Idaho Falls, Idaho
F	35	Simm-Marten Saadi	6 ft 9 in (2.06 m)	242 lb (110 kg)	Fr	Sunrise Christian Academy	Tallinn, Estonia
F	45	Neil Summers	6 ft 9 in (2.06 m)	290 lb (132 kg)	Fr	Laramie HS	Laramie, Wyoming

Head coach

- Sundance Wicks (Northern State)

Assistant coach(es)

- Will Martin (Kentucky)
- Chris McMillian (Wyoming)
- Nic Reynolds (Columbia College)
- Chris Thomas (Dayton)
- Nick Whitmore (Boise State)

Legend

- (C) Team captain
- (S) Suspended
- (I) Ineligible
- (W) Walk-on
- Injured
- Current redshirt

Roster
Last update: 2025-10-24

== Schedule and results ==
Date time, TV	Rank^{#}	Opponent^{#}	Result	Record	High points	High rebounds	High assists	Site (attendance) city, state
Exhibition
October 18, 2025*; 4:00 p.m.		vs. Northern Colorado	W 69–65		20 – Walker	8 – Meyer	– -	Pronghorn Center (3,160); Gillette, WY
October 25, 2025*; 12:30 p.m.		The College of Idaho	W 111–63		18 – Meyer	6 – Belic	4 – Meyer	Arena-Auditorium (3,000); Laramie, WY
Non-conference regular season
November 3, 2025*; 6:30 p.m., MW Network		Northern State	W 99–75	1–0	19 – Meyer	8 – Magassa	3 – Rojas	Arena-Auditorium (3,098); Laramie, WY
November 8, 2025*; 2:00 p.m., MW Network		Cal State Fullerton	W 92–82	2–0	18 – Meyer	6 – Belic	6 – Walker	Arena-Auditorium (3,211); Laramie, WY
November 11, 2025*; 6:30 p.m., MW Network		Austin Peay	W 79–65	3–0	23 – Rojas	11 – Magassa	5 – Bennett	Arena-Auditorium (3,249); Laramie, WY
November 15, 2025*; 7:00 p.m., MW Network		Portland	W 93–56	4–0	16 – Harris	7 – Tied	6 – Walker	Arena-Auditorium (3,428); Laramie, WY
November 19, 2025*; 5:30 0.m., ESPN+		at Sam Houston	L 70–78	4–1	24 – Walker	6 – Magassa	6 – Walker	Bernard Johnson Coliseum (1,551); Huntsville, TX
November 23, 2025*; 2:00 p.m., MW Network		Norfolk State	W 75–67	5–1	18 – Harakow	7 – Tied	6 – Bennett	Arena-Auditorium (3,245); Laramie, WY
November 26, 2025*; 6:30 p.m., MW Network		Denver	W 101–59	6–1	16 – Walker	8 – Rojas	4 – Tied	Arena-Auditorium (3,180); Laramie, WY
November 30, 2025*; 1:00 p.m., ESPN+		at No. 20 Texas Tech	L 72–76	6–2	28 – Walker	7 – Tied	3 – Bennett	United Supermarkets Arena (10,018); Lubbock, TX
December 6, 2025*; 2:00 p.m., MW Network		Dartmouth	W 93–80	7–2	18 – Walker	8 – Meyer	4 – Walker	Arena-Auditorium (3,422); Laramie, WY
December 9, 2025*; 6:00 p.m., MW Network		South Dakota	W 106–79	8–2	26 – Meyer	9 – Saxon	4 – Walker	Arena-Auditorium (3,643); Laramie, WY
December 15, 2025*; 6:00 p.m., Midco Sports		vs. South Dakota State	W 87–72	9–2	25 – Meyer	9 – Bennett	5 – Walker	Sanford Pentagon (1,477); Sioux Falls, SD
Mountain West regular season
December 20, 2025; 2:00 p.m., MW Network		Grand Canyon	L 70–82	9–3 (0–1)	13 – Walker	6 – Meyer	4 – Walker	Arena-Auditorium (3,853); Laramie, WY
December 30, 2025; 2:00 p.m., MW Network		at Air Force	W 68–56	10–3 (1–1)	14 – Meyer	9 – Belic	6 – Meyer	Clune Arena (1,835); Colorado Springs, CO
January 3, 2026; 6:00 p.m., CBSSN		at New Mexico	L 58–78	10–4 (1–2)	14 – Walker	6 – Gores	5 – Meyer	The Pit (13,763); Albuquerque, NM
January 6, 2026; 8:00 p.m., CBSSN		UNLV	W 98–66	11–4 (2–2)	28 – Walker	8 – Meyer	5 – Rojas	Arena-Auditorium (2,942); Laramie, WY
January 10, 2026; 8:00 p.m., MW Network		at Nevada	L 83–92	11–5 (2–3)	27 – Meyer	4 – Meyer	4 – Walker	Lawlor Events Center (8,906); Reno, NV
January 14, 2026; 6:00 p.m., CBSSN		San Diego State	L 57–74	11–6 (2–4)	13 – Meyer	8 – Gores	7 – Bennett	Arena-Auditorium (4,556); Laramie, WY
January 17, 2026; 5:00 p.m., MW Network		at Fresno State	L 60–63	11–7 (2–5)	17 – Walker	7 – Tied	5 – Walker	Save Mart Center (6,539); Fresno, CA
January 20, 2026; 6:30 p.m., MW Network		Boise State	L 65–81	11–8 (2–6)	30 – Walker	10 – Bennett	3 – Rojas	Arena-Auditorium (3,789); Laramie, WY
January 24, 2026; 2:00 p.m., MW Network		San Jose State	W 66–62	12–8 (3–6)	16 – Dennis	8 – Magassa	3 – Tied	Arena-Auditorium (4,125); Laramie, WY
January 28, 2026; 7:00 p.m., CBSSN		at Utah State	L 62–94	12–9 (3–7)	24 – Walker	5 – Tied	4 – Bennett	Smith Spectrum (10,270); Logan, UT
January 31, 2026; 7:30 p.m., FS1		Colorado State; Border War	W 68–57	13–9 (4–7)	22 – Bennett	10 – Bennett	4 – Walker	Arena-Auditorium (6,384); Laramie, WY
February 3, 2026; 9:00 p.m., CBSSN		at San Diego State	L 63–72	13–10 (4–8)	14 – Tied	8 – Gores	5 – Rojas	Viejas Arena (11,614); San Diego, CA
February 7, 2026; 6:00 p.m., CBSSN		Utah State	L 83–85	13–11 (4–9)	20 – Dennis	7 – Bennett	5 – Walker	Arena-Auditorium (3,703); Laramie, WY
February 14, 2026; 2:00 p.m., MW Network		at Colorado State; Border War	L 68–79	13–12 (4–10)	21 – Dennis	9 – Bennett	3 – Tied	Moby Arena (6,528); Fort Collins, CO
February 17, 2026; 6:30 p.m., MW Network		Fresno State	W 92–82	14–12 (5–10)	22 – Meyer	8 – Bennett	5 – Bennett	Arena-Auditorium (3,755); Laramie, WY
February 21, 2026; 6:00 p.m., MW Network		at Grand Canyon	W 70–65	15–12 (6–10)	13 – Tied	8 – Tied	4 – Walker	Global Credit Union Arena (7,315); Phoenix, AZ
February 24, 2026; 7:00 p.m., MW Network		at Boise State	L 62–72	15–13 (6–11)	16 – Dennis	7 – Meyer	3 – Tied	ExtraMile Arena (9,038); Boise, ID
February 28, 2026; 2:00 p.m., MW Network		Air Force	W 66–62	16–13 (7–11)	16 – Dennis	8 – Meyer	3 – Dennis	Arena-Auditorium (4,422); Laramie, WY
March 3, 2026; 8:00 p.m., MW Network		Nevada	W 83–73	17–13 (8–11)	27 – Bennett	7 – Bennett	5 – Bennett	Arena-Auditorium (3,478); Laramie, WY
March 7, 2026; 3:00 p.m., MW Network		at San Jose State	W 88–78	18–13 (9–11)	20 – Gores	7 – Meyer	7 – Walker	Provident Credit Union Event Center (2,183); San Jose, CA
Mountain West tournament
March 11, 2026; 12:00 p.m., MW Network	(9)	vs. (8) UNLV; First round	L 70–73	18–14	15 – Gores	11 – Dennis	6 – Walker	Thomas & Mack Center; Paradise, NV
NIT
March 17, 2026; 5:00 p.m., ESPNU		at (3 T) Wichita State; First round	L 70–74	18–15	17 – Dennis	7 – Meyer	6 – Walker	Charles Koch Arena (3,733); Wichita, KS
*Non-conference game. ^{#}Rankings from AP Poll. (#) Tournament seedings in parentheses. T=Tulsa. All times are in Mountain Time.
