= 2025–26 Boise State Broncos men's basketball team =

American college basketball season

2025–26 Boise State Broncos men's basketball
- Conference: Mountain West Conference
- Record: 20–12 (12–8 MW)
- Head coach: Leon Rice (16th season)
- Assistant coaches: Mike Burns (10th season); Tim Duryea (8th season); Roberto Bergersen (8th season); Lexus Williams (2nd season)
- Home arena: ExtraMile Arena

2025–26 Mountain West Conference men's basketball standings
	Conf.				Overall
Team	W		L	PCT	W		L	PCT
Utah State †	15	–	5	.750	28	–	6	.824
San Diego State	14	–	6	.700	22	–	11	.667
New Mexico	13	–	7	.650	23	–	10	.697
Grand Canyon	13	–	7	.650	20	–	12	.625
Nevada	12	–	8	.600	22	–	12	.647
Boise State	12	–	8	.600	20	–	12	.625
Colorado State	11	–	9	.550	21	–	12	.636
UNLV	11	–	9	.550	17	–	16	.515
Wyoming	9	–	11	.450	18	–	14	.563
Fresno State	7	–	13	.350	13	–	19	.406
San Jose State	3	–	17	.150	9	–	24	.273
Air Force	0	–	20	.000	3	–	29	.094
† 2026 Mountain West tournament winner As of March 14, 2026

The 2025–26 Boise State Broncos men's basketball team represented Boise State University during the 2025–26 NCAA Division I men's basketball season. The Broncos were led by 16th-year head coach Leon Rice as members of the Mountain West Conference (MWC). They played their home games at ExtraMile Arena in Boise, Idaho.

The season marked the last season for Boise State in the MWC. In September 2024, the Pac-12 Conference announced that Boise State was one of four schools that would join that conference after the 2025–26 school year.

== Previous season ==
The Broncos finished the 2024–25 season 26–11, 14–6 in Mountain West play to finish in a tie for fourth place. As the No. 5 seed in the Mountain West tournament, they upset San Diego State in the quarterfinals and New Mexico in the semifinals to reach the tournament championship game. However, they lost to Colorado State in the championship game. They received an at-large bid to the first-ever College Basketball Crown Tournament, where they defeated George Washington in the first round, Butler in the quarterfinals, before losing to Nebraska in the semifinals.

== Offseason ==
=== 2025 recruiting class ===
College recruiting information
Name	Hometown	School	Height	Weight	Commit date
Spencer Ahrens; PF	Oakville, Ontario	Bella Vista HS	6 ft 9 in (2.06 m)	215 lb (98 kg)	Dec 21, 2024
Spencer Ahrens; PF	Recruit ratings: Rivals: 247Sports: On3: ESPN: (81)				
Noah Bendinger; CG	Draper, UT	Corner Canyon HS	6 ft 4 in (1.93 m)	170 lb (77 kg)	Nov 13, 2024
Noah Bendinger; CG	Recruit ratings: Rivals: 247Sports: On3: ESPN:				
Bhan Buom; PF	Lincoln, NE	Link Year Academy	6 ft 8 in (2.03 m)	180 lb (82 kg)	Apr 28, 2025
Bhan Buom; PF	Recruit ratings: Rivals: 247Sports: On3: ESPN:				
Aginaldo Neto; PG	Luanda, Angola	NBA Academy Africa	6 ft 2 in (1.88 m)	180 lb (82 kg)	Jun 4, 2025
Aginaldo Neto; PG	Recruit ratings: Rivals: 247Sports: On3: ESPN:				
Overall recruit ranking: 247Sports: 82 On3: 90
Note: In many cases, Scout, Rivals, 247Sports, On3, and ESPN may conflict in their listings of height and weight.; In these cases, the average was taken. ESPN grades are on a 100-point scale.; Sources: "Boise State Broncos 2025 Player Commits". ESPN.; "2025 Team Ranking". Rivals.; "2025–26 Boise State Broncos men's basketball team". 247Sports.; "2025 Boise State Broncos Basketball Commits". On3.

== Roster ==
2025–26 Boise State Broncos men's basketball team
Players
Coaches

Pos.	#	Name	Height	Weight	Year	Previous school	Hometown
G	0	Julian Bowie	6 ft 3 in (1.91 m)	200 lb (91 kg)	So	Pocatello High School	Pocatello, Idaho
G	1	Aginaldo Neto	6 ft 3 in (1.91 m)	180 lb (82 kg)	Fr	NBA Academy Africa	Luanda, Angola
F	3	Bhan Buom	6 ft 8 in (2.03 m)	175 lb (79 kg)	Fr	Link Year Academy	Lincoln, Nebraska
G	4	Dylan Andrews	6 ft 3 in (1.91 m)	180 lb (82 kg)	Sr	UCLA	Gardena, California
G	5	RJ Keene II	6 ft 7 in (2.01 m)	212 lb (96 kg)	RS Sr	Concordia Lutheran High School	The Woodlands, Texas
F	6	Pearson Carmichael	6 ft 7 in (2.01 m)	208 lb (94 kg)	So	Summit High School	Bend, Oregon
F	9	Dominic Parolin (6th)	6 ft 9 in (2.06 m)	245 lb (111 kg)	Sr	Lehigh	Coquitlam, British Columbia
G	11	Rayzhon Bergersen	6 ft 2 in (1.88 m)	175 lb (79 kg)	RS Jr	Northwest Nazarene	Boise, Idaho
F	13	Andrew Meadow	6 ft 7 in (2.01 m)	218 lb (99 kg)	Jr	West Ranch High School	Santa Clarita, California
F	16	Spencer Ahrens	6 ft 10 in (2.08 m)	230 lb (104 kg)	Fr	Bella Vista College Prep	Oakville, Ontario
F/C	20	Drew Fielder	6 ft 11 in (2.11 m)	225 lb (102 kg)	Jr	Georgetown	Boise, Idaho
G	21	Brennan Ramirez	6 ft 2 in (1.88 m)	185 lb (84 kg)	RS Jr	Enterprise High School	Redding, California
F	22	Javan Buchanan	6 ft 7 in (2.01 m)	230 lb (104 kg)	Sr	Indiana Wesleyan	Lafayette, Indiana
G	23	Noah Bendinger	6 ft 4 in (1.93 m)	170 lb (77 kg)	Fr	Corner Canyon High School	Draper, Utah
F	30	Ethan Lathan	6 ft 10 in (2.08 m)	220 lb (100 kg)	RS Fr	AZ Compass Prep	Rockford, Illinois

Head coach

- Leon Rice (Washington State)

Assistant coach(es)

- Mike Burns (Central Washington)
- Tim Duryea (North Texas)
- Roberto Bergersen (Boise State)
- David Moats (Florida)
- Lexus Williams (Valparaiso)

Legend

- (C) Team captain
- (S) Suspended
- (I) Ineligible
- (W) Walk-on
- (6th) Sixth-year senior
- Injured
- Current redshirt

Roster
Last update: October 29, 2025

== Schedule and results ==
Date time, TV	Rank^{#}	Opponent^{#}	Result	Record	High points	High rebounds	High assists	Site (attendance) city, state
Exhibition
October 17, 2025*; 7:00 p.m.		vs. Idaho	W 89–83	–	24 – Fielder	8 – Tied	3 – Tied	Idaho Central Arena (4,164); Boise, ID
Non-conference regular season
November 3, 2025*; 7:00 p.m., MW Network		Hawaii Pacific	L 78–79	0–1	15 – Andrews	8 – Meadow	9 – Andrews	ExtraMile Arena (10,795); Boise, ID
November 8, 2025*; 2:00 p.m., MW Network		Utah Valley	W 101–77	1–1	20 – Fielder	6 – Fielder	6 – Buchanan	ExtraMile Arena (10,240); Boise, ID
November 11, 2025*; 7:00 p.m., MW Network		UT Rio Grande Valley	W 85–65	2–1	21 – Meadow	10 – Keene II	4 – Tied	ExtraMile Arnea (8,999); Boise, ID
November 15, 2025*; 2:00 p.m., MW Network		Montana State	W 62–58	3–1	19 – Buchanan	9 – Buchanan	5 – Andrews	ExtraMile Arena (9,780); Boise, ID
November 18, 2025*; 7:00 p.m., MW Network		Wichita State	W 62–59	4–1	17 – Fielder	6 – Fielder	7 – Andrews	ExtraMile Arena (9,725); Boise, ID
November 24, 2025*; 3:00 p.m., ESPN2		vs. USC; Southwest Maui Invitational First Round	L 67–70	4–2	18 – Buchanan	7 – Tied	3 – Andrews	Lahaina Civic Center (2,400); Lahaina, HI
November 25, 2025*; 12:30 p.m., ESPN2		vs. No. 23 NC State; Southwest Maui Invitational Consolation 2nd Round	L 70–81	4–3	26 – Andrews	9 – Buchanan	3 – Fielder	Lahaina Civic Center (2,400); Lahaina, HI
November 26, 2025*; 10:00 p.m., ESPN2		vs. Chaminade; Southwest Maui Invitational 7th Place Game	W 102–76	5–3	27 – Fielder	14 – Fielder	4 – Tied	Lahaina Civic Center (2,400); Lahaina, HI
December 6, 2025*; Noon, truTV		at Butler	W 77–68	6–3	20 – Andrews	10 – Parolin	4 – Keene	Hinkle Fieldhouse (7,422); Indianapolis, IN
December 10, 2025*; 7:00 p.m., MW Network		Duquesne	W 86–64	7–3	26 – Carmichael	6 – Tied	5 – Andrews	ExtraMile Arena (9,373); Boise, ID
December 14, 2025*; 4:00 p.m.		vs. Saint Mary's	W 68–67	8–3	22 – Fielder	7 – Tied	2 – Tied	Mountain America Center; Idaho Falls, ID
Mountain West regular season
December 20, 2025; 8:00 p.m., MW Network		at Nevada	L 66–81	8–4 (0–1)	16 – Meadow	10 – Parolin	5 – Neto	Lawlor Events Center (9,091); Reno, NV
December 30, 2025; 9:00 p.m., FS1		New Mexico	W 62–53	9–4 (1–1)	12 – Ahrens	6 – Meadow	2 – Andrews	ExtraMile Arena (9,980); Boise, ID
January 3, 2026; 8:00 p.m., CBSSN		at San Diego State	L 107–110 ^{3OT}	9–5 (1–2)	29 – Buchanan	9 – Fielder	6 – Tied	Viejas Arena (10,295); San Diego, CA
January 7, 2026; 9:00 p.m., FS1		Grand Canyon	L 58–75	9–6 (1–3)	18 – Buchanan	5 – Carmichael	2 – Tied	ExtraMile Arena (8,806); Boise, ID
January 10, 2026; 7:00 p.m., CBSSN		Utah State	L 68–93	9–7 (1–4)	16 – Andrews	6 – Tied	5 – Parolin	ExtraMile Arena (10,651); Boise, ID
January 13, 2026; 9:00 p.m., CBSSN		at UNLV	L 85–89 ^{OT}	9–8 (1–5)	23 – Fielder	7 – Parolin	5 – Keene II	Thomas & Mack Center (5,098); Las Vegas, NV
January 16, 2026; 8:30 p.m., FS1		Colorado State	W 79–73	10–8 (2–5)	21 – Andrews	8 – Fielder	4 – Fielder	ExtraMile Arena (9,800); Boise, ID
January 20, 2026; 6:30 p.m., MW Network		at Wyoming	W 81–65	11–8 (3–5)	21 – Meadow	9 – Fielder	3 – Tied	Arena-Auditorium (3,789); Laramie, WY
January 24, 2026; 2:00 p.m., MW Network		Air Force	W 96–54	12–8 (4–5)	20 – Fielder	8 – Fielder	3 – Tied	ExtraMile Arena (10,484); Boise, ID
January 27, 2026; 8:00 p.m., MW Network		at San Jose State	W 89–58	13–8 (5–5)	16 – Fielder	8 – Fielder	5 – Neto	Provident Credit Union Event Center (1,874); San Jose, CA
January 30, 2026; 7:00 p.m., FS1		at Grand Canyon	L 69–86	13–9 (5–6)	14 – Buchanan	6 – Buchanan	3 – Tied	Global Credit Union Arena (7,391); Phoenix, AZ
February 3, 2026; 7:00 p.m., MW Network		Nevada	W 91–87 ^{OT}	14–9 (6–6)	25 – Andrews	9 – Parolin	6 – Andrews	ExtraMile Arena (9,224); Boise, ID
February 7, 2026; 8:00 p.m., CBSSN		at New Mexico	W 91–90	15–9 (7–6)	33 – Andrews	8 – Carmichael	4 – Andrews	The Pit (14,379); Albuquerque, NM
February 13, 2026; 8:00 p.m., FS1		UNLV	L 83–86 ^{OT}	15–10 (7–7)	27 – Fielder	6 – Tied	5 – Andrews	ExtraMile Arena (10,155); Boise, ID
February 18, 2026; 8:30 p.m., FS1		at Utah State	L 56–75	15–11 (7–8)	14 – Fielder	8 – Fielder	3 – Neto	Dee Glen Smith Spectrum (10,270); Logan, UT
February 21, 2026; 2:00 p.m., MW Network		San Jose State	W 84–69	16–11 (8–8)	20 – Fielder	7 – Buchanan	4 – Andrews	ExtraMile Arena (10,761); Boise, ID
February 24, 2026; 7:00 p.m., MW Network		Wyoming	W 72−62	17−11 (9−8)	20 – Andrews	9 – Keene II	4 – Keene II	ExtraMile Arena (9,038); Boise, ID
February 28, 2026; 5:30 p.m., MW Network		at Fresno State	W 69–53	18−11 (10−8)	26 – Buchanan	9 – Parolin	3 – Tied	Save Mart Arena (6,142); Fresno, CA
March 3, 2026; 7:00 p.m., CBSSN		San Diego State; Senior Night	W 86–77	19–11 (11–8)	33 – Fielder	9 – Fielder	5 – Keene II	ExtraMile Arena (12,171); Boise, ID
March 7, 2026; 2:00 p.m., MW Network		at Colorado State	W 78–67	20–11 (12–8)	23 – Fielder	7 – Meadow	3 – Andrews	Moby Arena (7,105); Fort Collins, CO
Mountain West tournament
March 11, 2026; 9:30 p.m., MW Network	(6)	vs. (11) San Jose State; First round	L 74–84	20–12	28 – Buchanan	13 – Buchanan	2 – Tied	Thomas & Mack Center (2,351); Las Vegas, NV
*Non-conference game. ^{#}Rankings from AP Poll. (#) Tournament seedings in parentheses. All times are in Mountain Time.
