= 2026 Mountain West Conference men's basketball tournament =

American college basketball competition

- Classification: Division I
- Season: 2025–26
- Teams: 12
- Site: Thomas & Mack Center; Paradise, Nevada
- Champions: Utah State (3rd title)
- Winning coach: Jerrod Calhoun (1st title)
- MVP: MJ Collins Jr. (Utah State)
- Television: Mountain West Network, CBSSN, CBS/Paramount+

2025–26 Mountain West Conference men's basketball standings
	Conf.				Overall
Team	W		L	PCT	W		L	PCT
Utah State †	15	–	5	.750	29	–	7	.806
San Diego State	14	–	6	.700	22	–	11	.667
New Mexico	13	–	7	.650	26	–	11	.703
Grand Canyon	13	–	7	.650	20	–	12	.625
Nevada	12	–	8	.600	24	–	13	.649
Boise State	12	–	8	.600	20	–	12	.625
Colorado State	11	–	9	.550	21	–	13	.618
UNLV	11	–	9	.550	18	–	17	.514
Wyoming	9	–	11	.450	18	–	15	.545
Fresno State	7	–	13	.350	13	–	19	.406
San Jose State	3	–	17	.150	9	–	24	.273
Air Force	0	–	20	.000	3	–	29	.094
† 2026 Mountain West tournament winner

The 2026 Mountain West Conference men's basketball tournament was the postseason men's basketball tournament for the Mountain West Conference. It was held March 11–14, 2026, at the Thomas & Mack Center on the campus of University of Nevada, Las Vegas, in Paradise, Nevada. The tournament champion, Utah State, received the conference's automatic bid to the NCAA tournament. It also was the last tournament under the current format as the conference will see many changes in the off season with some of the current schools.

== Seeds ==
All 12 Mountain West schools participated in the tournament. Teams were seeded by conference record with a tiebreaker system to seed teams with identical percentages. The top four teams received byes into the tournament quarterfinals. The remaining teams played in the first round. Tie-breaking procedures remained unchanged since the 2020 tournament.

- Head-to-head record between the tied teams
- Record against the highest-seeded team not involved in the tie, going down through the seedings as necessary
- Higher NET

Seed	School	Conf	Tiebreaker(s)
1	Utah State	15–5	
2	San Diego State	14–6	
3	New Mexico	13–7	2–0 vs. Grand Canyon
4	Grand Canyon	13–7	0–2 vs. New Mexico
5	Nevada	12–8	1–1 vs. Utah State
6	Boise State	12–8	0–2 vs. Utah State
7	Colorado State	11–9	2–0 vs. UNLV
8	UNLV	11–9	0–2 vs. Colorado State
9	Wyoming	9–11	
10	Fresno State	7–13	
11	San Jose State	3–17	
12	Air Force	0–20	

== Schedule ==
Game	Time	Matchup	Score	Television	Attendance
First round – Wednesday, March 11
1	12:00 pm	No. 8 UNLV vs. No. 9 Wyoming	73–70	Mountain West Network	2,770
2	2:30 pm	No. 5 Nevada vs. No. 12 Air Force	80–45	Mountain West Network	2,770
3	6:00 pm	No. 7 Colorado State vs. No. 10 Fresno State	67–63	Mountain West Network	2,351
4	8:30 pm	No. 6 Boise State vs. No. 11 San Jose State	74–84	Mountain West Network	2,351
Quarterfinals – Thursday, March 12
5	12:00 pm	No. 1 Utah State vs. No. 8 UNLV	80–60	CBSSN	6,911
6	2:30 pm	No. 4 Grand Canyon vs. No. 5 Nevada	80–84	CBSSN	6,911
7	6:00 pm	No. 2 San Diego State vs. No. 7 Colorado State	71–62	CBSSN	6,236
8	8:30 pm	No. 3 New Mexico vs. No. 11 San Jose State	93–77	CBSSN	6,236
Semifinals – Friday, March 13
9	6:30 pm	No. 1 Utah State vs. No. 5 Nevada	79–66	CBSSN	9,048
10	9:25 pm	No. 2 San Diego State vs. No. 3 New Mexico	64–62	CBSSN	9,048
Championship – Saturday, March 14
11	3:00 pm	No. 1 Utah State vs. No. 2 San Diego State	73–62	CBS/Paramount+	6,451
Game times in PDT. Rankings denote tournament seeding.

== Bracket ==
First round Wednesday, March 11; Mountain West Network
8	UNLV	73
9	Wyoming	70
5	Nevada	80
12	Air Force	45
7	Colorado State	67
10	Fresno State	63
6	Boise State	74
11	San Jose State	84

Quarterfinals; Thursday, March 12; CBSSN
1	Utah State	80
8	UNLV	60
4	Grand Canyon	80
5	Nevada	84
2	San Diego State	71
7	Colorado State	62
3	New Mexico	93
11	San Jose State	77

Semifinals; Friday, March 13; CBSSN
1	Utah State	79
5	Nevada	66
2	San Diego State	64
3	New Mexico	62

Championship; Saturday, March 14; CBS/Paramount+
1	Utah State	73
2	San Diego State	62

== Awards and Honors ==
=== All-Tournament Team ===
Player	Team
Reese Dixon-Waters	San Diego State
Magoon Gwath	San Diego State
Drake Allen	Utah State
Mason Falslev	Utah State
MJ Collins Jr.	Utah State

MVP in bold
