= Jerrod Calhoun =

American basketball coach (born 1981)

Current position
- Title: Head coach
- Team: Cincinnati
- Conference: Big 12
- Record: 5–1 (.833)

Biographical details
- Born: October 17, 1981 (age 45); East Liverpool, Ohio, U.S.
- Education: Cincinnati (2004)

Playing career
- 2001–2003: Cleveland State
- Position: Guard

Coaching career (HC unless noted)
- 2003–2004: Cincinnati (student assistant)
- 2004–2007: Walsh (assistant)
- 2007–2012: West Virginia (assistant)
- 2012–2017: Fairmont State
- 2017–2024: Youngstown State
- 2024–2026: Utah State
- 2026–present: Cincinnati

Head coaching record
- Overall: 302–160 (.654)
- Tournaments: 1–2 (NCAA Division I); 7–4 (NCAA Division II); 0–1 (NIT); 1–1 (TBC)

Accomplishments and honors

Championships
- MEC regular season (2017); Horizon League regular season (2023); MWC regular season (2026); MWC tournament (2026)

Awards
- Horizon League Coach of the Year (2023); MW Coach of the Year (2026)

Jerrod Frank Calhoun (born October 17, 1981) is an American college basketball coach and former player who is the head men's basketball coach at the University of Cincinnati, his alma mater. He was previously the head coach at Utah State from 2024 to 2026, Youngstown State from 2017 to 2024, and Fairmont State from 2012 to 2017.

== Playing career ==
Calhoun was born in East Liverpool, Ohio. He was a standout basketball player at Villa Angela-St. Joseph High School in Cleveland, Ohio.

Calhoun attended Cleveland State University and played two seasons under Rollie Massimino. He then transferred to the University of Cincinnati and acted as a student assistant under Bob Huggins until his graduation in 2004.

== Coaching career ==
=== Assistant coach (2003–12) ===
Calhoun's first job post graduation was as an assistant at Walsh University where he was part of the Cavaliers' NAIA national championship squad in 2005. In 2007, Calhoun rejoined Huggins at West Virginia as director of basketball operations, while being elevated to assistant coach for one season.

=== Fairmont State (2012–17) ===
In 2012, Calhoun was hired as the head coach of Division II Fairmont State University, and in six seasons at the helm, he guided the Falcons to a 124–38 record, which included four NCAA Division II Tournament appearances, and culminated in the school's first-ever title game appearance in 2017.

=== Youngstown State (2017–2024) ===
Calhoun was named the 13th coach in Youngstown State history on March 27, 2017, replacing Jerry Slocum.

=== Utah State (2024–26) ===
On March 30, 2024, Calhoun was named the 22nd head coach of the Utah State men’s basketball team, replacing former coach Danny Sprinkle.

=== Cincinnati (2026–present) ===
On March 24, 2026, Calhoun was named the 29th head coach of the Cincinnati Bearcats men's basketball team, replacing Wes Miller.

== Head coaching record ==
Record table
Season	Team	Overall	Conference	Standing	Postseason
Fairmont State Fighting Falcons (West Virginia Intercollegiate Athletic Conference) (2012–2013)
2012–13	Fairmont State	23–9	17–5	2nd	NCAA Division II Second Round
Fairmont State Fighting Falcons (Mountain East Conference) (2013–2017)
2013–14	Fairmont State	20–10	14–8	4th	
2014–15	Fairmont State	22–11	16–6	4th	NCAA Division II Second Round
2015–16	Fairmont State	25–5	19–3	3rd	NCAA Division II First Round
2016–17	Fairmont State	34–3	21–1	1st	NCAA Division II Runner-up
Fairmont State:		124–38 (.765)	87–23 (.791)		
Youngstown State Penguins (Horizon League) (2017–2024)
2017–18	Youngstown State	8–24	6–12	T–8th	
2018–19	Youngstown State	12–20	8–10	T–6th	
2019–20	Youngstown State	18–15	10–8	T–4th	No postseason held
2020–21	Youngstown State	15–12	9–11	6th	
2021–22	Youngstown State	19–15	12–9	7th	TBC Second Round
2022–23	Youngstown State	24–10	15–5	1st	NIT First Round
2023–24	Youngstown State	22–10	14–6	2nd	
Youngstown State:		118–106 (.527)	74–61 (.548)		
Utah State Aggies (Mountain West Conference) (2024–2026)
2024–25	Utah State	26–8	15–5	3rd	NCAA Division I Round of 64
2025–26	Utah State	29–7	15–5	1st	NCAA Division I Round of 32
Utah State:		55–15 (.786)	30–10 (.750)		
Cincinnati Bearcats (Big 12 Conference) (2026–present)
2026–27	Cincinnati	5–1	0–0		
Cincinnati:		5–1 (.833)	0–0 (–)		
Total:		302–160 (.654)			
National champion Postseason invitational champion Conference regular season champion Conference regular season and conference tournament champion Division regular season champion Division regular season and conference tournament champion Conference tournament champion

== Personal life ==
Calhoun is a devout Catholic.
