= Jaden Henley =

American basketball player (born 2004)

Personal information
- Born: April 24, 2004 (age 22) Baldwin Park, California, U.S.
- Listed height: 6 ft 7 in (2.01 m)
- Listed weight: 210 lb (95 kg)

Career information
- High school: Colony (Ontario, California)
- College: Minnesota (2022–2023); DePaul (2023–2024); UNLV (2024–2025); Grand Canyon (2025–2026)
- Position: Small forward / shooting guard

Jaden Henley (born April 24, 2004) is an American basketball player. He played college basketball for the Minnesota Golden Gophers, DePaul Blue Demons, UNLV Runnin' Rebels and the Grand Canyon Antelopes.

== Early life and high school ==
Henley attended Colony High School in Ontario, California, and averaged 17.2 points, 6.1 rebounds, 2.4 assist and 2.5 steals per game as a senior. He committed to play college basketball for the Minnesota Golden Gophers over San Diego State.

== College career ==
On November 7, 2022, Henley started in Minnesota's season-opening win over Western Michigan. On November 11, he dropped 16 points in a victory against St. Francis Brooklyn. Henley played 31 games with 18 starts, averaging 5.3 points and 2.2 rebounds per game. After the season, he entered the NCAA transfer portal.

Henley transferred to play for the DePaul Blue Demons. In 2023-24, he averaged 8.6 points per game in 23 starts. After the season, Henley once again entered the NCAA transfer portal.

Henley transferred to play for the UNLV Runnin' Rebels. On February 25, 2025, he dropped 22 points in a win over San Jose State. On February 28, he recorded a then-career-high 23 points, eight rebounds, three assists, and a block in a win against rival Nevada. Henley averaged 12.5 points, 4.2 rebounds, 1.8 assists, and 1.6 steals per game on the season, after which he again entered the NCAA transfer portal.

Henley transferred to play for the Grand Canyon Antelopes. On December 22, 2025, he notched a career-high 29 points, eight rebounds, two assists, and two steals in a victory over IU Indy. Henley averaged 17.7 points, 5.7 rebounds, 2.9 assists and 1.6 steals per game on the season, after which he declared for the 2026 NBA draft.

== Career statistics ==
Legend
GP	Games played	GS	Games started	MPG	Minutes per game
FG%	Field goal percentage	3P%	3-point field goal percentage	FT%	Free throw percentage
RPG	Rebounds per game	APG	Assists per game	SPG	Steals per game
BPG	Blocks per game	PPG	Points per game	**Bold**	Career high

=== College ===
Year	Team	GP	GS	MPG	FG%	3P%	FT%	RPG	APG	SPG	BPG	PPG
2022–23	Minnesota	31	18	20.8	.376	**.378**	.633	2.2	1.3	.8	.2	5.3
2023–24	DePaul	**32**	23	24.4	.436	.269	.755	2.7	1.3	.9	.2	8.6
2024–25	UNLV	28	27	29.4	.433	.351	**.864**	4.2	1.8	**1.6**	.1	12.5
2025–26	Grand Canyon	**32**	**32**	**31.4**	**.466**	.268	.756	**5.7**	**2.9**	**1.6**	**.3**	**17.7**
Career		123	100	26.4	.438	.307	.764	3.7	1.8	1.2	.2	11.0
