= 2025–26 Portland State Vikings men's basketball team =

American college basketball season

2025–26 Portland State Vikings men's basketball

Big Sky regular season champions
- Conference: Big Sky Conference
- Record: 20–11 (13–5 Big Sky)
- Head coach: Jase Coburn (5th season)
- Associate head coach: Matt Dunn
- Assistant coaches: Jamaal Williams; Mike Harmon; Caden Hoffman; Gabe Palmquist-Clark
- Home arena: Viking Pavilion

2025–26 Big Sky men's basketball standings
	Conf.				Overall
Team	W		L	PCT	W		L	PCT
Portland State	13	–	5	.722	20	–	11	.645
Montana State	12	–	6	.667	18	–	14	.563
Eastern Washington	11	–	7	.611	14	–	19	.424
Montana	10	–	8	.556	18	–	16	.529
Northern Colorado	10	–	8	.556	20	–	12	.625
Weber State	10	–	8	.556	16	–	16	.500
Idaho †	9	–	9	.500	21	–	15	.583
Sacramento State	6	–	12	.333	10	–	21	.323
Idaho State	5	–	13	.278	13	–	20	.394
Northern Arizona	4	–	14	.222	10	–	22	.313
† 2026 Big Sky tournament winner

The 2025–26 Portland State Vikings men's basketball team represented Portland State University during the 2025–26 NCAA Division I men's basketball season. The Vikings, led by fifth-year head coach Jase Coburn, played their home games at the Viking Pavilion in Portland, Oregon as members of the Big Sky Conference.

== Previous season ==
The Vikings finished the 2024–25 season 19–13, 11–7 in Big Sky play, to finish in third place. They were defeated by Idaho in the quarterfinals of the Big Sky tournament.

== Preseason ==
On October 22, 2025, the Big Sky Conference released their preseason coaches and media poll. Portland State was picked to finish second in both the coaches poll and the media poll, while receiving three first-place votes in the former and nine-first place votes in the latter.

=== Preseason rankings ===
Big Sky Preseason Coaches' Poll
Place	Team	Votes
1	Montana	78 (6)
2	Portland State	72 (3)
3	Northern Colorado	63
4	Idaho	59 (1)
T-5	Eastern Washington	40
T-5	Montana State	40
7	Sacramento State	35
8	Idaho State	31
9	Weber State	22
10	Northern Arizona	10
(#) first-place votes

Big Sky preseason media poll
Place	Team	Votes
1	Montana	323 (21)
2	Portland State	302 (9)
3	Northern Colorado	245 (2)
4	Idaho	231 (2)
5	Idaho State	202
6	Montana State	165
7	Sacramento State	143 (1)
8	Eastern Washington	136
9	Weber State	113
10	Northern Arizona	61
(#) first-place votes

=== Preseason All-Big Sky Team ===
Preseason All-Big Sky Team
Player	Year	Position
Terri Miller Jr.	Senior	Forward
Jaylin Henderson	Senior	Guard
Tre-Vaughn Minott	Senior	Center

== Roster ==
2025–26 Portland State Vikings men's basketball team
Players
Coaches

Pos.	#	Name	Height	Weight	Year	Previous school	Hometown
G	0	Keyon Kensie Jr.	6 ft 8 in (2.03 m)	200 lb (91 kg)	Jr	San Diego	Los Angeles, California
G	1	Kelcy Phipps	6 ft 2 in (1.88 m)	190 lb (86 kg)	RS So	Bishop Montgomery High School	Carson, California
G	2	Mozae Downing-Rivers	6 ft 6 in (1.98 m)	215 lb (98 kg)	Sr	Missouri State	Lawrence, Kansas
G	3	Brycen Long	6 ft 2 in (1.88 m)	190 lb (86 kg)	RS Sr	Arizona State	Gilbert, Arizona
C	4	Tre-Vaughn Minott	6 ft 10 in (2.08 m)	245 lb (111 kg)	Sr	South Carolina	Montreal, Quebec
G	5	Jaylin Henderson	6 ft 3 in (1.91 m)	175 lb (79 kg)	Sr	Louisiana Tech	Wichita, Kansas
G	6	Sebastian Tidor	6 ft 5 in (1.96 m)	195 lb (88 kg)	Jr	Roane State Community College	Dallas, Georgia
F	7	Charles Chukwu	6 ft 9 in (2.06 m)	240 lb (109 kg)	RS Jr	Little Rock	Katy, Texas
F	9	Isaac Brice	6 ft 7 in (2.01 m)	210 lb (95 kg)	Sr	Iona	Picayune, Mississippi
G	10	Colt Ness (W)	6 ft 0 in (1.83 m)	170 lb (77 kg)	Fr	Tigard High School	Tigard, Oregon
G	12	Samuel Stewart IV (W)	6 ft 4 in (1.93 m)	180 lb (82 kg)	Sr	George Fox	San Diego, California
F	13	Kean Webb	6 ft 11 in (2.11 m)	235 lb (107 kg)	So	San Diego	St. George, Utah
G	15	Alex Dupre	6 ft 5 in (1.96 m)	190 lb (86 kg)	RS Fr	Birmingham High School	Los Angeles, California
G	21	Isaiah Williams	6 ft 7 in (2.01 m)	190 lb (86 kg)	Sr	Academy of Art	Oklahoma City, Oklahoma
F	23	Terri Miller Jr.	6 ft 8 in (2.03 m)	250 lb (113 kg)	Sr	Louisiana Tech	Fresno, California
F	32	Brayden Barron	6 ft 6 in (1.98 m)	200 lb (91 kg)	Fr	Sam Barlow High School	Gresham, Oregon
C	35	Matt Beatty (W)	6 ft 10 in (2.08 m)	215 lb (98 kg)	Fr	Roosevelt High School	Portland, Oregon

Head coach

- Jase Coburn (Arizona State)

Assistant coach(es)

- Matt Dunn (Fort Hays State)
- Jamaal Williams (Washington)
- Mike Harmon (Northeastern State)
- Caden Hoffman (Concordia–St. Paul)
- Gabe Palmquist-Clark (Oregon)

Legend

- (C) Team captain
- (S) Suspended
- (I) Ineligible
- (W) Walk-on
- Injured
- Current redshirt

Roster
Last update: December 5, 2025

== Schedule and results ==
Date time, TV	Rank^{#}	Opponent^{#}	Result	Record	High points	High rebounds	High assists	Site (attendance) city, state
Non-conference regular season
November 4, 2025*; 7:00 pm, ACCNX		at Stanford	L 79–89	0–1	22 – Tidor	7 – Tied	4 – Tied	Maples Pavilion (2,300); Stanford, CA
November 7, 2025*; 7:00 pm, ESPN+		Northwest Indian	W 122–74	1–1	20 – Henderson	12 – Kensie Jr.	5 – Ness	Viking Pavilion (700); Portland, OR
November 12, 2025*; 7:00 pm, ESPN+		at San Francisco	L 70–80	1–2	18 – Henderson	13 – Minott	6 – Tied	Sobrato Center (1,123); San Francisco, CA
November 17, 2025*; 7:00 pm, ESPN+		Cal State Bakersfield	W 93–80	2−2	28 – Henderson	8 – Kensie Jr.	5 – Tied	Viking Pavilion (685); Portland, OR
November 19, 2025*; 7:00 pm, ESPN+		Evergreen State	W 90–61	3−2	24 – Henderson	14 – Miller Jr.	7 – Henderson	Viking Pavilion (450); Portland, OR
November 25, 2025*; 6:00 pm, ESPN+		at Utah Tech	W 68–63	4–2	19 – Miller Jr.	16 – Minott	8 – Henderson	Burns Arena (1,246); St. George, UT
December 3, 2025*; 5:00 pm, SLN		at South Dakota; Big Sky–Summit Challenge	W 77–71	5–2	26 – Miller Jr.	11 – Miller Jr.	11 – Henderson	Sanford Coyote Sports Center (1,324); Vermillion, SD
December 6, 2025*; 2:00 pm, ESPN+		Omaha; Big Sky–Summit Challenge	L 55–60	5–3	12 – Tied	6 – Kensie Jr.	6 – Henderson	Viking Pavilion (572); Portland, OR
December 13, 2025*; 2:00 pm, ESPN+		George Fox	W 94–50	6–3	31 – Miller Jr.	9 – Miller Jr.	8 – Henderson	Viking Pavilion (547); Portland, OR
December 17, 2025*; 6:00 pm, ESPN+		at Colorado	L 73–84	6–4	23 – Henderson	8 – Kensie Jr.	4 – Henderson	CU Events Center (101); Boulder, CO
December 20, 2025*; 4:30 pm, ESPN+		at Tulane	L 61–63	6–5	22 – Tied	8 – Tied	5 – Henderson	Devlin Fieldhouse (1,243); New Orleans, LA
Big Sky regular season
January 1, 2026; 1:00 pm, ESPN+		at Weber State	W 95–90 ^{OT}	7–5 (1–0)	29 – Miller Jr.	13 – Tied	7 – Henderson	Dee Events Center (2,624); Ogden, UT
January 3, 2026; 3:00 pm, ESPN+		at Idaho State	W 93–87 ^{OT}	8–5 (2–0)	25 – Miller Jr.	11 – Minott	7 – Henderson	Reed Gym (1,292); Pocatello, ID
January 10, 2026; 2:00 pm, ESPN+		Sacramento State	W 96–69	9–5 (3–0)	26 – Henderson	20 – Minott	13 – Miller Jr.	Viking Pavilion (1,304); Portland, OR
January 15, 2026; 7:00 pm, ESPN+		Northern Colorado	W 76–73	10–5 (4–0)	19 – Henderson	8 – Tied	7 – Henderson	Viking Pavilion (746); Portland, OR
January 17, 2026; 2:00 pm, ESPN+		Northern Arizona	W 63–52	11–5 (5–0)	20 – Kensie Jr.	11 – Minott	6 – Henderson	Viking Pavilion (922); Portland, OR
January 22, 2026; 6:00 pm, ESPN+		at Eastern Washington	W 65–61	12–5 (6–0)	22 – Miller Jr.	10 – Kensie Jr.	9 – Henderson	Reese Court (1,270); Cheney, WA
January 24, 2026; 2:00 pm, ESPN+		at Idaho	W 69–66	13–5 (7–0)	29 – Miller Jr.	8 – Kensie Jr.	5 – Henderson	ICCU Arena (2,366); Moscow, ID
January 29, 2026; 7:00 pm, ESPN+		Montana	L 60–64	13–6 (7–1)	15 – Miller Jr.	12 – Minott	5 – Henderson	Viking Pavilion (1,462); Portland, OR
January 31, 2026; 2:00 pm, ESPN+		Montana State	W 63–54	14–6 (8–1)	24 – Kensie Jr.	11 – Henderson	8 – Henderson	Viking Pavilion (1,795); Portland, OR
February 2, 2026; 7:00 pm, ESPN+		Idaho State	W 88–65	15–6 (9–1)	30 – Henderson	6 – Minott	7 – Henderson	Viking Pavilion (1,023); Portland, OR
February 7, 2026; 7:00 pm, ESPN+		at Sacramento State	W 74–73	16–6 (10–1)	22 – Miller Jr.	16 – Kensie Jr.	3 – Downing-Rivers	Hornet Pavilion (3,016); Sacramento, CA
February 12, 2026; 5:00 pm, ESPN+		at Northern Arizona	W 77–68	17–6 (11–1)	27 – Miller Jr.	7 – Miller Jr.	3 – Miller Jr.	Findlay Toyota Court (612); Flagstaff, AZ
February 14, 2026; 1:00 pm, ESPN+		at Northern Colorado	L 65–77	17–7 (11–2)	29 – Henderson	11 – Minott	2 – Tied	Bank of Colorado Arena (1,553); Greeley, CO
February 19, 2026; 6:00 pm, ESPNU		Idaho	W 77–67	18–7 (12–2)	24 – Kensie Jr.	10 – Minott	10 – Henderson	Viking Pavilion (2,180); Portland, OR
February 21, 2026; 2:00 pm, ESPN+		Eastern Washington	L 55–67	18–8 (12–3)	21 – Miller Jr.	9 – Minott	5 – Henderson	Viking Pavilion (1,595); Portland, OR
February 26, 2026; 6:00 pm, ESPN+		at Montana State	L 69–84	18–9 (12–4)	29 – Miller Jr.	11 – Minott	5 – Henderson	Worthington Arena (3,346); Bozeman, MT
February 28, 2026; 1:00 pm, ESPN+		at Montana	L 68–74	18–10 (12–5)	20 – Henderson	11 – Minott	6 – Henderson	Dahlberg Arena (3,078); Missoula, MT
March 2, 2026; 7:00 pm, ESPN+		Weber State	W 84–60	19–10 (13–5)	20 – Henderson	9 – Minott	10 – Henderson	Viking Pavilion (1,649); Portland, OR
Big Sky tournament
March 8, 2026; 4:30 pm, ESPN+	(1)	vs. (9) Idaho State; Quarterfinals	W 85–78	20–10	31 – Miller Jr.	10 – Miller Jr.	4 – Miller Jr.	Idaho Central Arena; Boise, ID
March 10, 2026; 6:00 pm, ESPNU	(1)	vs. (4) Montana; Semifinals	L 72–75	20–11	23 – Henderson	12 – Minott	4 – Henderson	Idaho Central Arena; Boise, ID
*Non-conference game. ^{#}Rankings from AP Poll. (#) Tournament seedings in parentheses. All times are in Pacific.
