= 2025–26 Weber State Wildcats men's basketball team =

American college basketball season

2025–26 Weber State Wildcats men's basketball
- Conference: Big Sky Conference
- Record: 16–16 (10–8 Big Sky)
- Head coach: Eric Duft (4th season)
- Associate head coach: Dan Russell
- Assistant coaches: Shaun Vandiver; Jorge Ruiz; Luke Spring
- Home arena: Dee Events Center

2025–26 Big Sky men's basketball standings
	Conf.				Overall
Team	W		L	PCT	W		L	PCT
Portland State	13	–	5	.722	20	–	10	.667
Montana State	12	–	6	.667	18	–	14	.563
Eastern Washington	11	–	7	.611	14	–	18	.438
Montana	10	–	8	.556	17	–	15	.531
Northern Colorado	10	–	8	.556	20	–	12	.625
Weber State	10	–	8	.556	16	–	16	.500
Idaho	9	–	9	.500	19	–	14	.576
Sacramento State	6	–	12	.333	10	–	21	.323
Idaho State	5	–	13	.278	13	–	20	.394
Northern Arizona	4	–	14	.222	10	–	22	.313
† 2026 Big Sky tournament winner As of March 9, 2026

The 2025–26 Weber State Wildcats men's basketball team represented Weber State University during the 2025–26 NCAA Division I men's basketball season. The Wildcats, led by fourth-year head coach Eric Duft, played their home games at the Dee Events Center in Ogden, Utah as members of the Big Sky Conference.

== Previous season ==
The Wildcats finished the 2024–25 season 12–22, 5–13 in Big Sky play, to finish in ninth place. They defeated Sacramento State, before falling to top-seeded Northern Colorado in the quarterfinals of the Big Sky tournament.

== Preseason ==
On October 22, 2025, the Big Sky Conference released their preseason coaches and media poll. Weber State was picked to finish ninth in both the coaches poll and the media poll.

=== Preseason rankings ===
Big Sky Preseason Coaches' Poll
Place	Team	Votes
1	Montana	78 (6)
2	Portland State	72 (3)
3	Northern Colorado	63
4	Idaho	59 (1)
T-5	Eastern Washington	40
T-5	Montana State	40
7	Sacramento State	35
8	Idaho State	31
9	Weber State	22
10	Northern Arizona	10
(#) first-place votes

Big Sky preseason media poll
Place	Team	Votes
1	Montana	323 (21)
2	Portland State	302 (9)
3	Northern Colorado	245 (2)
4	Idaho	231 (2)
5	Idaho State	202
6	Montana State	165
7	Sacramento State	143 (1)
8	Eastern Washington	136
9	Weber State	113
10	Northern Arizona	61
(#) first-place votes

=== Preseason All-Big Sky Team ===
No players were named to the All-Big Sky Team.

== Roster ==
2025–26 Weber State Wildcats men's basketball team
Players
Coaches

Pos.	#	Name	Height	Weight	Year	Previous school	Hometown
F	0	Edwin Suarez Jr.	6 ft 6 in (1.98 m)	205 lb (93 kg)	Jr	Arizona Western College	San Juan, Puerto Rico
G	3	Tijan Saine Jr.	5 ft 10 in (1.78 m)	175 lb (79 kg)	Jr	Western Washington	Everett, Washington
G	4	Anthony Moore	6 ft 5 in (1.96 m)	190 lb (86 kg)	Fr	Lincoln High School	Stockton, California
F/C	5	Nigel Burris	6 ft 7 in (2.01 m)	225 lb (102 kg)	Sr	Utah State	San Francisco, California
G	6	Trevor Hennig	6 ft 4 in (1.93 m)	185 lb (84 kg)	So	Mount Si High School	North Bend, Washington
F/C	7	Malek Gomma	6 ft 8 in (2.03 m)	245 lb (111 kg)	Jr	Seattle	Anchorage, Alaska
G/F	8	Viljami Vartiainen	6 ft 6 in (1.98 m)	195 lb (88 kg)	Jr	Helsinki Basketball Academy	Helsinki, Finland
G	9	Duce Paschal	6 ft 5 in (1.96 m)	185 lb (84 kg)	Fr	Central Catholic High School	Portland, Oregon
G	11	Brady Smith	6 ft 0 in (1.83 m)	175 lb (79 kg)	Jr	Green Canyon High School	Fargo, North Dakota
G	12	ArDarius Grayson	6 ft 1 in (1.85 m)	185 lb (84 kg)	Fr	Oakland Tech High School	Oakland, California
C	15	Declan Cutler	6 ft 9 in (2.06 m)	230 lb (104 kg)	So	Royal Crown School	Vancouver, British Columbia
F/C	17	Bourgeois Tshilobo	6 ft 8 in (2.03 m)	225 lb (102 kg)	Fr	Bishop Alemany High School	Kinshasa, Democratic Republic of the Congo
G	23	Tyler Christensen	6 ft 4 in (1.93 m)	200 lb (91 kg)	Jr	Cedar Valley High School	Eagle Mountain, Utah
G	24	Jace Whiting	6 ft 3 in (1.91 m)	190 lb (86 kg)	Jr	UNLV	Burley, Idaho
F	33	David Hansen	6 ft 9 in (2.06 m)	200 lb (91 kg)	RS Fr	Magrath High School	Magrath, Alberta

Head coach

- Eric Duft (Sterling (KS))

Assistant coach(es)

- Dan Russell (Wyoming)
- Shaun Vandiver (Colorado)
- Jorge Ruiz (Grand Canyon)
- Luke Spring (UMass)

Legend

- (C) Team captain
- (S) Suspended
- (I) Ineligible
- (W) Walk-on
- Injured
- Current redshirt

Roster
Last update: December 5, 2025

== Schedule and results ==
Date time, TV	Rank^{#}	Opponent^{#}	Result	Record	High points	High rebounds	High assists	Site (attendance) city, state
Exhibition
October 29, 2025*; 7:00 pm		Colorado Christian	W 66–63	–	11 – Whiting	14 – Gomma	3 – Tied	Dee Events Center; Ogden, UT
Non-conference regular season
November 3, 2025*; 7:00 pm, ESPN+		West Coast Baptist	W 130–38	1–0	20 – Hennig	13 – Cutler	8 – Grayson	Dee Events Center (1,086); Ogden, UT
November 8, 2025*; 5:00 pm, ESPN+		at Utah	L 89–92	1–1	15 – Whiting	11 – Suarez Jr.	4 – Saine Jr.	Jon M. Huntsman Center (6,214); Salt Lake City, UT
November 12, 2025*; 7:00 pm, KMYU/MWN		at Utah State	L 73–83	1–2	19 – Hennig	12 – Burris	5 – Saine Jr.	Smith Spectrum (9,124); Logan, UT
November 15, 2025*; 8:00 pm, ESPN+		at UC Irvine	L 70−79	1−3	13 – Suarez Jr.	8 – Gomma	4 – Whiting	Bren Events Center (1,964); Irvine, CA
November 19, 2025*; 8:00 pm, ESPN+		Campbell; Junction City Jam	W 91−85	2−3	23 – Saine Jr.	9 – Gomma	7 – Saine Jr.	Dee Events Center (2,224); Ogden, UT
November 22, 2025*; 7:00 pm, ESPN+		UT Arlington; Junction City Jam	L 73–74	2–4	13 – Whiting	5 – Tied	2 – Tied	Dee Events Center (2,473); Ogden, UT
November 29, 2025*; 2:00 pm, ESPN+		Kansas City	W 82–61	3–4	17 – Vartiainen	12 – Suarez Jr.	5 – Tied	Dee Events Center (2,012); Ogden, UT
December 3, 2025*; 7:00 pm, ESPN+		Oral Roberts; Big Sky-Summit Challenge	W 92–66	4–4	18 – Whiting	7 – Tied	7 – Saine Jr.	Dee Events Center (2,133); Ogden, UT
December 7, 2025*; 11:00 am, SLN		at St. Thomas; Big Sky-Summit Challenge	L 65–88	4–5	17 – Whiting	10 – Gomma	4 – Whiting	Lee & Penny Anderson Arena (1,998); St. Paul, MN
December 10, 2025*; 6:00 pm, SLN		at Kansas City	W 64–60	5–5	19 – Gomma	13 – Gomma	5 – Whiting	Swinney Recreation Center (572); Kansas City, MO
December 17, 2025*; 6:00 pm, ESPN+		at Utah Valley	L 74–90	5–6	26 – Suarez	10 – Suarez	5 – Saine	UCCU Center (1,457); Orem, UT
December 20, 2025*; 7:00 pm, ESPN+		Utah Tech	L 80–82	5–7	28 – Saine	7 – Gomma	4 – Saine	Dee Events Center (2,793); Ogden, UT
December 22, 2025*; 2:00 pm, ESPN+		Lincoln (CA)	W 103–64	6–7	14 – Paschal	8 – Cutler	5 – Whiting	Dee Events Center (1,163); Ogden, UT
Big Sky regular season
January 1, 2026; 2:00 pm, ESPN+		Portland State	L 90–95 ^{OT}	6–8 (0–1)	23 – Saine Jr.	12 – Suarez Jr.	8 – Saine Jr.	Dee Events Center (2,624); Ogden, UT
January 3, 2026; 7:00 pm, ESPN+		Sacramento State	W 95–82	7–8 (1–1)	20 – Tied	8 – Suarez Jr.	3 – Tied	Dee Events Center (2,716); Ogden, UT
January 8, 2026; 6:00 pm, ESPN+		at Northern Arizona	W 78–65	8–8 (2–1)	16 – Vartiainen	6 – Tied	4 – Saine Jr.	Findlay Toyota Court (273); Flagstaff, AZ
January 10, 2026; 6:00 pm, ESPN+		at Northern Colorado	W 76–71	9–8 (3–1)	18 – Suarez Jr.	8 – Suarez Jr.	1 – Tied	Bank of Colorado Arena (1,470); Greeley, CO
January 15, 2026; 7:00 pm, ESPN+		Eastern Washington	W 91–80	10–8 (4–1)	23 – Saine Jr.	8 – Gomma	5 – Saine Jr.	Dee Events Center (2,920); Ogden, UT
January 17, 2026; 7:00 pm, ESPN+		Idaho	L 67–75	10–9 (4–2)	25 – Saine Jr.	12 – Gomma	6 – Saine Jr.	Dee Events Center (3,202); Ogden, UT
January 22, 2026; 7:00 pm, ESPN+		at Montana	L 65–81	10–10 (4–3)	21 – Thompson	5 – Tied	6 – Williams	Dahlberg Arena (2,947); Missoula, MT
January 24, 2026; 6:00 pm, ESPN+		at Montana State	L 88–91	10–11 (4–4)	24 – Saine Jr.	6 – Suarez Jr.	4 – Saine Jr.	Worthington Arena (3,782); Bozeman, MT
January 31, 2026; 1:00 pm, ESPN+		Idaho State	W 81–79	11–11 (5–4)	28 – Saine Jr.	10 – Gomma	8 – Saine Jr.	Dee Events Center (3,015); Ogden, UT
February 2, 2026; 8:00 pm, ESPN+		at Sacramento State	L 90–104	11–12 (5–5)	22 – Saine Jr.	10 – Gomma	6 – Saine Jr.	Hornet Pavilion (2,819); Sacramento, CA
February 5, 2026; 7:00 pm, ESPN+		Northern Colorado	L 74–88	11–13 (5–6)	24 – Saine Jr.	12 – Suarez Jr.	12 – Suarez Jr.	Dee Events Center (2,649); Ogden, UT
February 7, 2026; 7:00 pm, ESPN+		Northern Arizona	W 72–53	12–13 (6–6)	20 – Saine Jr.	9 – Tied	5 – Saine Jr.	Dee Events Center (2,903); Ogden, UT
February 12, 2026; 7:00 pm, ESPN+		at Idaho	W 83–72	13–13 (7–6)	29 – Saine Jr.	6 – Tied	3 – Tied	ICCU Arena (1,680); Moscow, ID
February 14, 2026; 3:00 pm, ESPN+		at Eastern Washington	L 66–84	13–14 (7–7)	20 – Saine Jr.	4 – Vartiainen	2 – Tied	Reese Court (1,773); Cheney, WA
February 19, 2026; 7:00 pm, ESPN+		Montana State	W 82–79 ^{OT}	14–14 (8–7)	19 – Henning	9 – Gomma	5 – Saine Jr.	Dee Events Center (4,011); Ogden, UT
February 21, 2026; 7:00 pm, ESPN+		Montana	W 92–72	15–14 (9–7)	25 – Vartiainen	6 – Tied	7 – Saine Jr.	Dee Events Center (3,975); Ogden, UT
February 28, 2026; 4:00 pm, ESPN+		at Idaho State	W 83–73	16–14 (10–7)	24 – Saine Jr.	9 – Burris	4 – Saine Jr.	Reed Gym (1,811); Pocatello, ID
March 2, 2026; 8:00 pm, ESPN+		at Portland State	L 60–84	16–15 (10–8)	20 – Henderson	9 – Minott	10 – Henderson	Viking Pavilion (1,649); Portland, OR
Big Sky tournament
March 9, 2026; 8:30 pm, ESPN+	(6)	vs. (3) Eastern Washington; Quarterfinal	L 79–84	16–16	27 – Saine Jr.	8 – Gomma	2 – Saine Jr.	Idaho Central Arena; Boise, ID
*Non-conference game. ^{#}Rankings from AP Poll. (#) Tournament seedings in parentheses. All times are in Mountain.
