= 2025–26 Eastern Washington Eagles men's basketball team =

American college basketball season

2025–26 Eastern Washington Eagles men's basketball
- Conference: Big Sky Conference
- Record: 14–19 (11–7 Big Sky)
- Head coach: Dan Monson (2nd season)
- Associate head coach: Ryan Lundgren
- Assistant coaches: Larry Anderson; MicGuire Monson; Alex Hobbs; Ron DuBois
- Home arena: Reese Court

2025–26 Big Sky men's basketball standings
	Conf.				Overall
Team	W		L	PCT	W		L	PCT
Portland State	13	–	5	.722	20	–	10	.667
Montana State	12	–	6	.667	18	–	14	.563
Eastern Washington	11	–	7	.611	14	–	18	.438
Montana	10	–	8	.556	17	–	15	.531
Northern Colorado	10	–	8	.556	20	–	12	.625
Weber State	10	–	8	.556	16	–	16	.500
Idaho	9	–	9	.500	19	–	14	.576
Sacramento State	6	–	12	.333	10	–	21	.323
Idaho State	5	–	13	.278	13	–	20	.394
Northern Arizona	4	–	14	.222	10	–	22	.313
† 2026 Big Sky tournament winner As of March 9, 2026

The 2025–26 Eastern Washington Eagles men's basketball team represented Eastern Washington University during the 2025–26 NCAA Division I men's basketball season. The Eagles, led by second-year head coach Dan Monson, played their home games at Reese Court in Cheney, Washington as members of the Big Sky Conference.

== Previous season ==
The Eagles finished the 2024–25 season 10–22, 6–12 in Big Sky play, to finish in eighth place. They were defeated by Northern Arizona in the first round of the Big Sky tournament.

== Preseason ==
On October 22, 2025, the Big Sky Conference released their preseason coaches and media poll. Eastern Washington was picked to finish tied for fifth in the coaches' poll and eighth in the media poll.

=== Preseason rankings ===
Big Sky Preseason Coaches' Poll
Place	Team	Votes
1	Montana	78 (6)
2	Portland State	72 (3)
3	Northern Colorado	63
4	Idaho	59 (1)
T-5	Eastern Washington	40
T-5	Montana State	40
7	Sacramento State	35
8	Idaho State	31
9	Weber State	22
10	Northern Arizona	10
(#) first-place votes

Big Sky preseason media poll
Place	Team	Votes
1	Montana	323 (21)
2	Portland State	302 (9)
3	Northern Colorado	245 (2)
4	Idaho	231 (2)
5	Idaho State	202
6	Montana State	165
7	Sacramento State	143 (1)
8	Eastern Washington	136
9	Weber State	113
10	Northern Arizona	61
(#) first-place votes

=== Preseason All-Big Sky Team ===
Preseason All-Big Sky Team
Player	Year	Position
Andrew Cook	Graduate student	Guard

== Roster ==
2025–26 Eastern Washington Eagles men's basketball team
Players
Coaches

Pos.	#	Name	Height	Weight	Year	Previous school	Hometown
F	0	Angelo Winkel	6 ft 8 in (2.03 m)	225 lb (102 kg)	Sr	Des Moines Area Community College	Algona, IA
G	1	Tyler Powell	6 ft 4 in (1.93 m)	210 lb (95 kg)	RS Sr	Nevada	Los Angeles, CA
G	2	Isaiah Moses	6 ft 0 in (1.83 m)	190 lb (86 kg)	RS Sr	UC Riverside	Anchorage, AK
G	5	Elijah Thomas	6 ft 5 in (1.96 m)	195 lb (88 kg)	Sr	Des Moines Area Community College	Surprise, AZ
G	9	Andrew Cook (injured)	6 ft 4 in (1.93 m)	220 lb (100 kg)	GS	Carroll College	Huntington Beach, CA
G	10	Maddox Monson	6 ft 2 in (1.88 m)	185 lb (84 kg)	Sr	Long Beach State	Los Alamitos, CA
G	11	Cole Scherer	6 ft 2 in (1.88 m)	185 lb (84 kg)	Fr	Valor Christian High School	Littleton, CO
G	12	Straton Rogers	6 ft 5 in (1.96 m)	205 lb (93 kg)	GS	College of Idaho	Eagle, ID
F	13	Alton IV Hamilton	6 ft 9 in (2.06 m)	235 lb (107 kg)	Jr	Lewis–Clark State College	Fontana, CA
F	15	Kiree Huie	6 ft 9 in (2.06 m)	245 lb (111 kg)	GS	Miami (FL)	Grayson, GA
G	21	Johnny Radford	6 ft 1 in (1.85 m)	180 lb (82 kg)	GS	College of Idaho	Hailey, ID
G	22	Jojo Anderson	6 ft 2 in (1.88 m)	185 lb (84 kg)	RS Sr	Idaho	Spokane, WA
F	33	Emmett Marquardt	6 ft 10 in (2.08 m)	225 lb (102 kg)	RS So	Garfield High School	Seattle, WA
F	35	Shaumba Ngoyi	6 ft 8 in (2.03 m)	225 lb (102 kg)	RS So	Long Beach State	Kinshasa, DR Congo
F	55	Alan Gballou	6 ft 7 in (2.01 m)	255 lb (116 kg)	Fr	Layton Christian Academy	Paris, France

Head coach

- Dan Monson (Idaho)

Assistant coach(es)

- Ryan Lundgren (Boise State)
- Larry Anderson (Long Beach State)
- MicGuire Monson (Boise State)
- Alex Hobbs (Boise State)
- Chris Martin (Corban)

Legend

- (C) Team captain
- (S) Suspended
- (I) Ineligible
- (W) Walk-on
- Injured
- Current redshirt

Roster
Last update: October 29, 2025

== Schedule and results ==
Date time, TV	Rank^{#}	Opponent^{#}	Result	Record	High points	High rebounds	High assists	Site (attendance) city, state
Exhibition
October 20, 2025*; 6:00 p.m.		Carroll	W 87–74	–	–	–	–	Reese Court; Cheney, WA
October 25, 2025*; 1:00 p.m.		at Nevada	L 52–73	–	15 – Moses	8 – Hamilton IV	4 – Moses	Lawlor Events Center (8,741); Reno, NV
Non-conference regular season
November 3, 2025*; 7:30 p.m., BTN		at No. 12 UCLA	L 74–80	0–1	15 – Moses	8 – Radford	5 – Anderson	Pauley Pavilion (3,615); Los Angeles, CA
November 5, 2025*; 7:30 p.m., ESPN+		at LMU	L 62–70	0–2	15 – Moses	7 – Hamilton IV	4 – Radford	Gersten Pavilion (892); Los Angeles, CA
November 8, 2025*; 1:00 p.m., ESPN+		at Colorado	L 97–102 ^{OT}	0–3	30 – Moses	8 – Hamilton IV	5 – Moses	CU Events Center (5,289); Boulder, CO
November 12, 2025*; 7:00 p.m., ESPN+		at Seattle	L 67−94	0−4	13 – Radford	5 – tied	5 – Hamilton IV	Redhawk Center (870); Seattle, WA
November 17, 2025*; 7:30 p.m., ESPN+		Eastern Oregon	W 91–73	1–4	22 – Moses	10 – Rogers	5 – Moses	Reese Court (2,121); Cheney, WA
November 23, 2025*; 11:00 a.m., ESPN+		at Central Arkansas	L 65–92	1–5	17 – Moses	7 – Rogers	2 – tied	Farris Center (653); Conway, AR
November 25, 2025*; 5:00 p.m., ESPN+		at North Texas	L 71–79 ^{OT}	1–6	16 – Hamilton IV	8 – Rogers	4 – Moses	The Super Pit (2,591); Denton, TX
December 3, 2025*; 6:00 p.m., Summit League Network		at Denver; Big Sky–Summit League Challenge	L 89–93	1–7	28 – Moses	6 – Rogers	3 – tied	Hamilton Gymnasium (500); Denver, CO
December 6, 2025*; 2:00 p.m., ESPN+		Kansas City; Big Sky–Summit League Challenge	W 90–66	2–7	19 – Huie	7 – Hamilton IV	4 – Hamilton IV	Reese Court (1,755); Cheney, WA
December 12, 2025*; 6:00 p.m., ESPN+		California Baptist	L 83–88	2–8	23 – Moses	6 – Huie	6 – Moses	Reese Court (1,167); Cheney, WA
December 17, 2025*; 7:00 p.m., SWX		vs. Washington State; 509 Classic	L 63–78	2–9	16 – Hamilton IV	5 – Hamilton IV	5 – Moses	Numerica Veterans Arena (3,749); Spokane, WA
December 20, 2025*; 4:00 p.m., ESPN+		at Utah	L 77–101	2–10	19 – Hamilton IV	9 – Tied	4 – Anderson	Jon M. Huntsman Center (6,116); Salt Lake City, UT
December 22, 2025*; 6:00 p.m., ESPN+		at No. 10 BYU	L 81–109	2–11	17 – Huie	7 – Moses	6 – Hamilton IV	Marriott Center (17,998); Provo, UT
Big Sky regular season
January 3, 2026; 2:00 p.m., ESPN+		at Idaho	L 81–84	2–12 (0–1)	16 – Huie	11 – Huie	6 – Moses	ICCU Arena (2,083); Moscow, ID
January 8, 2026; 6:00 p.m., ESPN+		Montana State	L 64–68	2–13 (0–2)	24 – Moses	6 – Hamilton IV	5 – Radford	Reese Court (1,534); Cheney, WA
January 10, 2026; 2:00 p.m., ESPN+		Montana	W 66–65	3–13 (1–2)	20 – Moses	7 – Rogers	5 – Moses	Reese Court (2,343); Cheney, WA
January 15, 2026; 6:00 p.m., ESPN+		at Weber State	L 80–91	3–14 (1–3)	21 – Huie	7 – Huie	3 – Moses	Dee Events Center (2,920); Ogden, UT
January 17, 2026; 3:00 p.m., ESPN+		at Idaho State	W 84–66	4–14 (2–3)	22 – Moses	9 – Hamilton IV	3 – Moses	Reed Gym; Pocatello, ID
January 22, 2026; 6:00 p.m., ESPN+		Portland State	L 61–65	4–15 (2–4)	22 – Moses	6 – Hamilton IV	3 – Moses	Reese Court (1,270); Cheney, WA
January 24, 2026; 2:00 p.m., ESPN+		Sacramento State	W 75–67	5–15 (3–4)	16 – Huie	7 – Tied	4 – Tied	Reese Court (1,832); Cheney, WA
January 29, 2026; 5:00 p.m., ESPN+		at Northern Arizona	L 86–92	5–16 (3–5)	30 – Moses	9 – Rogers	3 – Moses	Findlay Toyota Court (676); Flagstaff, AZ
January 31, 2026; 1:00 p.m., ESPN+		at Northern Colorado	L 71–74	5–17 (3–6)	17 – Hamilton IV	8 – Tied	3 – Moses	Bank of Colorado Arena (1,708); Greeley, CO
February 5, 2026; 6:00 p.m., ESPN+		at Montana	W 82–74	6–17 (4–6)	15 – Huie	9 – Huie	8 – Moses	Dahlberg Arena (2,699); Missoula, MT
February 7, 2026; 5:00 p.m., ESPN+		at Montana State	W 72–71	7–17 (5–6)	15 – Hamilton IV	8 – Hamilton IV	3 – Anderson	Worthington Arena (3,272); Bozeman, MT
February 12, 2026; 6:00 p.m., ESPN+		Idaho State	W 88–75	8–17 (6–6)	19 – Moses	4 – Tied	9 – Anderson	Reese Court (1,282); Cheney, WA
February 14, 2026; 2:00 p.m., ESPN+		Weber State	W 84–66	9–17 (7–6)	24 – Hamilton IV	5 – Tied	4 – Anderson	Reese Court (1,773); Cheney, WA
February 19, 2026; 7:00 p.m., ESPN+		at Sacramento State	W 102–94	10–17 (8–6)	26 – Moses	8 – Huie	9 – Moses	Hornets Nest (2,691); Sacramento, CA
February 21, 2026; 2:00 p.m., ESPN+		at Portland State	W 67–55	11–17 (9–6)	22 – Moses	7 – Tied	3 – Tied	Viking Pavilion (1,595); Portland, OR
February 26, 2026; 6:00 p.m., ESPN+		Northern Colorado	W 82–72	12–17 (10–6)	23 – Huie	10 – Huie	6 – Moses	Reese Court (1,443); Cheney, WA
February 28, 2026; 1:00 p.m., ESPN+		Northern Arizona	W 88–57	13–17 (11–6)	23 – Hamilton IV	7 – Hamilton IV	3 – Tied	Reese Court (2,024); Cheney, WA
March 2, 2026; 6:00 p.m., ESPN+		Idaho	L 81–85	13–18 (11–7)	14 – Rasmussen	8 – Rasmussen	4 – Tied	Reese Court (1,729); Cheney, WA
Big Sky tournament
March 9, 2026; 7:00 p.m., ESPN+	(3)	vs. (6) Weber State; Quarterfinals	W 84–79	14–18	25 – Hamilton IV	6 – Thomas	8 – Moses	Idaho Central Arena; Boise, ID
March 10, 2026; 8:30 p.m., ESPN2	(3)	vs. (7) Idaho; Semifinals	L 68–81	14–19	20 – Huie	7 – Tied	6 – Moses	Idaho Central Arena; Boise, ID
*Non-conference game. ^{#}Rankings from AP poll. (#) Tournament seedings in parentheses. All times are in Pacific.
