= 2025–26 Northern Colorado Bears men's basketball team =

American college basketball season

2025–26 Northern Colorado Bears men's basketball
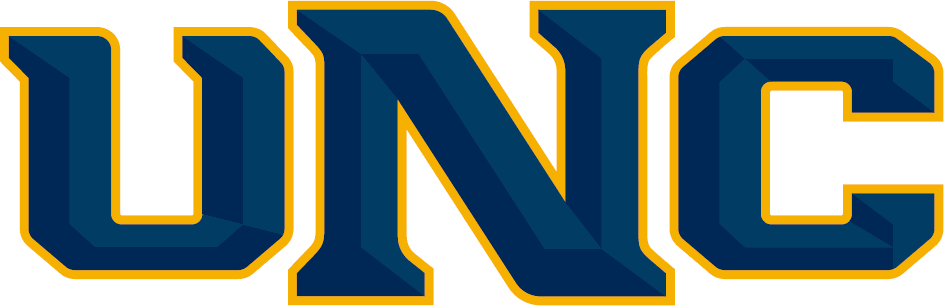
- Conference: Big Sky Conference
- Record: 20–12 (10–8 Big Sky)
- Head coach: Steve Smiley (6th season)
- Assistant coaches: Dorian Green; Houston Reed; Brett Cloepfil; Colin Gause; Dondrale Campbell
- Home arena: Bank of Colorado Arena

2025–26 Big Sky men's basketball standings
	Conf.				Overall
Team	W		L	PCT	W		L	PCT
Portland State	13	–	5	.722	20	–	11	.645
Montana State	12	–	6	.667	18	–	14	.563
Eastern Washington	11	–	7	.611	14	–	19	.424
Montana	10	–	8	.556	18	–	16	.529
Northern Colorado	10	–	8	.556	20	–	12	.625
Weber State	10	–	8	.556	16	–	16	.500
Idaho †	9	–	9	.500	21	–	15	.583
Sacramento State	6	–	12	.333	10	–	21	.323
Idaho State	5	–	13	.278	13	–	20	.394
Northern Arizona	4	–	14	.222	10	–	22	.313
† 2026 Big Sky tournament winner

The 2025–26 Northern Colorado Bears men's basketball team represented the University of Northern Colorado during the 2025–26 NCAA Division I men's basketball season. The Bears, led by sixth-year head coach Steve Smiley, played their home games at the Bank of Colorado Arena in Greeley, Colorado as members of the Big Sky Conference.

== Previous season ==
The Bears finished the 2024–25 season 25–10, 15–3 in Big Sky play, to finish as Big Sky regular season co-champions, alongside Montana. They defeated Weber State and Montana State, before falling to Montana in the Big Sky tournament championship game. They received an automatic bid to the NIT, where they would be defeated by eventual tournament runner-up UC Irvine in the first round.

== Preseason ==
On October 22, 2025, the Big Sky Conference released their preseason coaches and media poll. Northern Colorado was picked to finish third in both the coaches poll and the media poll, while receiving two first-place votes in the latter poll.

=== Preseason rankings ===
Big Sky Preseason Coaches' Poll
Place	Team	Votes
1	Montana	78 (6)
2	Portland State	72 (3)
3	Northern Colorado	63
4	Idaho	59 (1)
T-5	Eastern Washington	40
T-5	Montana State	40
7	Sacramento State	35
8	Idaho State	31
9	Weber State	22
10	Northern Arizona	10
(#) first-place votes

Big Sky preseason media poll
Place	Team	Votes
1	Montana	323 (21)
2	Portland State	302 (9)
3	Northern Colorado	245 (2)
4	Idaho	231 (2)
5	Idaho State	202
6	Montana State	165
7	Sacramento State	143 (1)
8	Eastern Washington	136
9	Weber State	113
10	Northern Arizona	61
(#) first-place votes

=== Preseason All-Big Sky Team ===
No players were named to the All-Big Sky Team.

== Roster ==
2025–26 Northern Colorado Bears men's basketball team
Players
Coaches

Pos.	#	Name	Height	Weight	Year	Previous school	Hometown
F	0	Walker Asp	6 ft 7 in (2.01 m)	180 lb (82 kg)	So	Palmer High School	Colorado Springs, Colorado
G	1	Vincent Delano	6 ft 2 in (1.88 m)	180 lb (82 kg)	RS So	Portland	Phoenix, Arizona
G	2	Kaden Ericksen	6 ft 4 in (1.93 m)	185 lb (84 kg)	Jr	Eastern Arizona College	Syracuse, Utah
G	3	Ariik Mawien	6 ft 4 in (1.93 m)	185 lb (84 kg)	So	Link Year Prep Academy	Anoka, Minnesota
C	4	Hunter Caldwell	6 ft 10 in (2.08 m)	230 lb (104 kg)	So	Lutheran High School	Parker, Colorado
G	5	Steven Ramirez Jr.	6 ft 4 in (1.93 m)	205 lb (93 kg)	Fr	Keller High School	Fort Worth, Texas
F	7	Ring Nyeri	6 ft 8 in (2.03 m)	185 lb (84 kg)	So	Kansas City	Peoria, Arizona
G	8	Zach Bloch	6 ft 2 in (1.88 m)	185 lb (84 kg)	GS	Colorado Prep	Lawrence, Kansas
G	10	Tanner Braketa	6 ft 1 in (1.85 m)	180 lb (82 kg)	Fr	Ralston Valley High School	Arvada, Colorado
G	11	Chancellor White	6 ft 6 in (1.98 m)	195 lb (88 kg)	Jr	Louisiana	Richmond, Texas
G	13	Will Dixion III	6 ft 2 in (1.88 m)	200 lb (91 kg)	RS Fr	Simpson College	Tucson, Arizona
F	14	Brock Wisne	6 ft 9 in (2.06 m)	245 lb (111 kg)	Sr	Colorado Prep	Thornton, Colorado
F	21	William Humer	6 ft 10 in (2.08 m)	225 lb (102 kg)	Sr	San Jose State	Sollentuna, Sweden
C	33	Egan Shields	6 ft 10 in (2.08 m)	250 lb (113 kg)	Jr	Colorado Prep	Ashland, Oregon
G	35	Quinn Denker	6 ft 3 in (1.91 m)	190 lb (86 kg)	GS	Idaho	San Jose, California
F	54	Ibu Yamazaki	6 ft 7 in (2.01 m)	215 lb (98 kg)	Jr	Radford	Matsudo, Japan

Head coach

- Steve Smiley (Northern State)

Assistant coach(es)

- Dorian Green (Colorado State)
- Houston Reed (Northern State)
- Brett Cloepfil (CSU Pueblo)
- Colin Gause (Northern Colorado)
- Dondrale Campbell (Greenville)

Legend

- (C) Team captain
- (S) Suspended
- (I) Ineligible
- (W) Walk-on
- Injured
- Current redshirt

Roster
Last update: December 4, 2025

== Schedule and results ==
Date time, TV	Rank^{#}	Opponent^{#}	Result	Record	High points	High rebounds	High assists	Site (attendance) city, state
Non-conference regular season
November 3, 2025*; 7:30 pm, ESPN+		Colorado College	W 91–57	1–0	13 – Denker	7 – Tied	7 – Denker	Bank of Colorado Arena (1,181); Greeley, CO
November 7, 2025*; 6:00 pm, ESPN+		Colorado Christian	W 101–65	2–0	24 – Bloch	8 – Shields	10 – Denker	Bank of Colorado Arena (1,430); Greeley, CO
November 15, 2025*; 7:00 pm, ESPN+		at Pepperdine	W 88–81 ^{OT}	3–0	26 – Denker	10 – Tied	5 – Tied	Firestone Fieldhouse (608); Malibu, CA
November 21, 2025*; 5:30 pm, ESPN+		vs. St. Thomas; Portland Invitational	L 72−73	3−1	21 – Denker	7 – Tied	6 – Denker	Chiles Center (450); Portland, OR
November 22, 2025*; 6:00 pm, ESPN+		at Portland; Portland Invitational	W 86−80 ^{OT}	4−1	29 – Denker	11 – Shields	7 – Denker	Chiles Center (1,116); Portland, OR
November 23, 2025*; 12:00 pm, ESPN+		vs. Cal State Fullerton; Portland Invitational	W 97–93	5–1	32 – Bloch	9 – Wisne	5 – Delano	Chiles Center; Portland, OR
November 26, 2025*; 4:00 pm, Altitude/MWN		at Air Force	W 71–53	6–1	23 – Denker	8 – Wisne	8 – Denker	Clune Arena (1,391); Air Force Academy, CO
November 29, 2025*; 6:00 pm, ESPN+		Regis	W 104–63	7–1	17 – Mawien	11 – Humer	5 – Denker	Bank of Colorado Arena (1,190); Greeley, CO
December 3, 2025*; 6:00 pm, SLN		at Omaha; Big Sky - Summit Challenge	W 75–70	8–1	22 – Denker	8 – Wisne	8 – Denker	Baxter Arena (2,350); Omaha, NE
December 6, 2025*; 6:00 pm, ESPN+		South Dakota; Big Sky - Summit Challenge	W 89–87 ^{OT}	9–1	19 – Shields	5 – Shields	4 – Tied	Bank of Colorado Arena (1,492); Greeley, CO
December 16, 2025*; 6:00 pm, ESPN+		at No. 19 Texas Tech	L 90–101	9–2	29 – Wisne	7 – Nyeri	8 – Bloch	United Supermarkets Arena (9,855); Lubbock, TX
December 20, 2025*; 1:00 pm, ESPN+		Denver	L 79–86	9–3	27 – Wisne	13 – Nyeri	4 – Wisne	Bank of Colorado Arena (1,352); Greeley, CO
December 28, 2025*; 1:00 pm, ESPN+		at Colorado	W 86–81	10–3	33 – Denker	8 – Denker	8 – Denker	CU Events Center (8,347); Boulder, CO
Big Sky regular season
January 1, 2026; 7:00 pm, ESPN+		at Montana State	L 75–89	10–4 (0–1)	18 – Bloch	11 – Shields	7 – Denker	Worthington Arena (2,829); Bozeman, MT
January 3, 2026; 4:00 pm, ESPN+		at Montana	L 79–88	10–5 (0–2)	22 – Wisne	8 – Wisne	7 – Denker	Dahlberg Arena (3,430); Missoula, MT
January 8, 2026; 6:00 pm, ESPN+		Idaho State	W 85–72	11–5 (1–2)	26 – Bloch	6 – Shields	11 – Denker	Bank of Colorado Arena (1,110); Greeley, CO
January 10, 2026; 6:00 pm, ESPN+		Weber State	L 71–76	11–6 (1–3)	17 – Tied	8 – Nyeri	7 – Denker	Bank of Colorado Arena (1,470); Greeley, CO
January 15, 2026; 8:00 pm, ESPN+		at Portland State	L 73–76	11–7 (1–4)	18 – Denker	5 – Yamazaki	6 – Denker	Viking Pavilion (746); Portland, OR
January 17, 2026; 8:00 pm, ESPN+		at Sacramento State	L 89–93	11–8 (1–5)	29 – Denker	8 – Shields	11 – Denker	Hornet Pavilion (2,596); Sacramento, CA
January 19, 2026; 6:00 pm, ESPN+		Montana State	L 68–73	11–9 (1–6)	18 – Wisne	14 – Nyeri	7 – Denker	Bank of Colorado Arena (1,362); Greeley, CO
January 24, 2026; 6:00 pm, ESPN+		at Northern Arizona	L 77–81	11–10 (1–7)	18 – Wisne	7 – Nyeri	5 – Tied	Findlay Toyota Court (905); Flagstaff, AZ
January 29, 2026; 7:00 pm, ESPN+		Idaho	W 91–83	12–10 (2–7)	35 – Denker	10 – Nyeri	10 – Denker	Bank of Colorado Arena (1,860); Greeley, CO
January 31, 2026; 2:00 pm, ESPN+		Eastern Washington	W 74–71	13–10 (3–7)	23 – Nyeri	9 – Wisne	8 – Denker	Bank of Colorado Arena (1,708); Greeley, CO
February 5, 2026; 7:00 pm, ESPN+		at Weber State	W 88–74	14–10 (4–7)	31 – Denker	9 – Wisne	9 – Denker	Dee Events Center (2,649); Ogden, UT
February 7, 2026; 4:00 pm, ESPN+		at Idaho State	W 69–61	15–10 (5–7)	17 – Wisne	8 – Wisne	4 – Denker	Reed Gym (1,215); Pocatello, ID
February 12, 2026; 6:00 pm, ESPN+		Sacramento State	W 95-79	16-10 (6-7)	29 – Wisne	11 – Tied	16 – Denker	Bank of Colorado Arena (1,704); Greeley, CO
February 14, 2026; 2:00 pm, ESPN+		Portland State	W 77-65	17-10 (7-7)	23 – Denker	10 – Wisne	7 – Denker	Bank of Colorado Arena (1,553); Greeley, CO
February 21, 2026; 6:00 pm, ESPN+		Northern Arizona	W 78-77	18-10 (8-7)	38 – Wisne	10 – Nyeri	4 – Denker	Bank of Colorado Arena (1,800); Greeley, CO
February 26, 2026; 7:00 pm, ESPN+		at Eastern Washington	L 72–82	18–11 (8–8)	19 – Denker	6 – Nyeri	8 – Denker	Reese Court (1,443); Cheney, WA
February 28, 2026; 2:00 pm, ESPN+		at Idaho	W 76–67	19–11 (9–8)	33 – Denker	8 – Nyeri	5 – Delano	ICCU Arena (2,459); Moscow, ID
March 2, 2026; 6:00 pm, ESPN+		Montana	W 85–57	20–11 (10–8)	16 – Tied	7 – Tied	4 – Denker	Bank of Colorado Arena (2,016); Greeley, CO
Big Sky tournament
March 8, 2026; 5:30 p.m., ESPN+	(5)	vs. (4) Montana; Quarterfinal	L 89–95	20–12	29 – Denker	11 – Wisne	8 – Denker	Idaho Central Arena; Boise, ID
*Non-conference game. ^{#}Rankings from AP Poll. (#) Tournament seedings in parentheses. All times are in Mountain.
