= 2025–26 Montana Grizzlies basketball team =

American college basketball season

2025–26 Montana Grizzlies basketball
- Conference: Big Sky Conference
- Record: 18–16 (10–8 Big Sky)
- Head coach: Travis DeCuire (12th season)
- Associate head coach: Chris Cobb (10th season)
- Assistant coaches: Jay Flores (9th season); Rachi Wortham (1st, 5th overall season); Ryan Frazer (1st season); Brian Morgan (1st season)
- Home arena: Dahlberg Arena (Capacity: 7,321)

2025–26 Big Sky men's basketball standings
	Conf.				Overall
Team	W		L	PCT	W		L	PCT
Portland State	13	–	5	.722	20	–	11	.645
Montana State	12	–	6	.667	18	–	14	.563
Eastern Washington	11	–	7	.611	14	–	19	.424
Montana	10	–	8	.556	18	–	16	.529
Northern Colorado	10	–	8	.556	20	–	12	.625
Weber State	10	–	8	.556	16	–	16	.500
Idaho †	9	–	9	.500	21	–	15	.583
Sacramento State	6	–	12	.333	10	–	21	.323
Idaho State	5	–	13	.278	13	–	20	.394
Northern Arizona	4	–	14	.222	10	–	22	.313
† 2026 Big Sky tournament winner

The 2025–26 Montana Grizzlies basketball team represented the University of Montana during the 2025–26 NCAA Division I men's basketball season. The Grizzlies were led by twelfth-year head coach Travis DeCuire and played their home games at Dahlberg Arena in Missoula, Montana as a member of the Big Sky Conference.

== Previous season ==
The Grizzlies finished the 2025-26 season 25–10, 15–3 in Big Sky play to finish tied for first place in the conference. As the 2-seed in the Big Sky Tournament they defeated 7-seed Northern Arizona and 6-seed Idaho to advance to the Championship round, where they bested top-seeded Northern Colorado 91–83 to secure the conference's auto-bid to the NCAA Tournament. The Grizzlies were placed as the 14-seed in the East region of the NCAA Tournament where they were defeated by 3-seed Wisconsin 66–85 to end their season.

== Offseason ==
=== Departures ===
Name	Number	Pos.	Height	Weight	Year	Hometown	Reason for departure
Kai Johnson	1	G	6'4"	190	Senior	Olympia, WA	Out of eligibility
Malik Moore	3	G	6'5"	190	Junior	Ventura, CA	Transferred to Xavier
Joe Pridgen	11	G	6'5"	210	Graduate	Winchendon, MA	Out of eligibility
Brandon Whitney	12	G	6'1"	183	Graduate	Mission Hills, CA	Out of eligibility
Zack Davidson	14	F	6'8"	224	(redshirt) Freshman	Santa Ana, CA	Transferred to Northern Arizona
Jalen Foy	15	F	6'7"	215	Junior	Las Vegas, NV	Transferred to Cal State East Bay
Austin Patterson	20	G	6'3"	185	Senior	Sonora, CA	Out of eligibility
Adam Shoff	22	G	6'1"	167	Graduate	Redding, CA	Out of eligibility
Jeremiah Dargan	24	G	6'4"	190	Junior	Concord, CA	Transferred to Chico State
Jensen Bradtke	50	F	6'10"	220	(redshirt) Freshman	Sandringham, Australia	Departed program

=== Incoming transfers ===
Name	Number	Pos.	Height	Weight	Year	Hometown	Previous college
Trae Taylor	1	F	6'9"	207	Senior	San Diego, CA	Chico State
Brooklyn Hicks	3	G	6'3"	186	Junior	Seattle, WA	UNLV
Kadyn Betts	7	F	6'8"	219	(redshirt) Junior	Pueblo, CO	Minnesota
Tyler Isaak	8	G	6'4"	190	Junior	Danville, CA	Citrus College
Grant Kepley	11	F	6'4"	180	(redshirt) Sophomore	Bellingham, WA	Western Washington
Courtney Anderson Jr.	13	G	6'5"	200	(redshirt) Sophomore	Vallejo, CA	Colorado

=== 2025 recruiting class ===
College recruiting information
Name	Hometown	School	Height	Weight	Commit date
Kenyon Aguino; PF	Albuquerque, NM	Volcano Vista HS	6 ft 7 in (2.01 m)	205 lb (93 kg)	Nov 18, 2024
Kenyon Aguino; PF	Recruit ratings: No ratings found				
Luke Moxon; SG	Arcata, CA	Arcata HS	6 ft 3 in (1.91 m)	210 lb (95 kg)	Apr 1, 2025
Luke Moxon; SG	Recruit ratings: No ratings found				
Overall recruit ranking: Scout: – Rivals: –
Note: In many cases, Scout, Rivals, 247Sports, On3, and ESPN may conflict in their listings of height and weight.; In these cases, the average was taken. ESPN grades are on a 100-point scale.; Sources: "2025 Montana Basketball Recruiting Commits". Scout.; "Scout.com Team Recruiting Rankings". Scout.; "2025 Team Ranking". Rivals.

== Roster ==
2025–26 Montana Grizzlies men's basketball team
Players
Coaches

Pos.	#	Name	Height	Weight	Year	Previous school	Hometown
G	0	Money Williams	6 ft 4 in (1.93 m)	211 lb (96 kg)	Jr	Oakland HS	Oakland, California
F	1	Trae Taylor	6 ft 9 in (2.06 m)	207 lb (94 kg)	Sr	Chico State	San Diego, California
G	2	Chase Henderson	6 ft 0 in (1.83 m)	172 lb (78 kg)	RS So	Herbert Hoover HS	Des Moines, Iowa
G	3	Brooklyn Hicks	6 ft 3 in (1.91 m)	186 lb (84 kg)	Jr	UNLV	Seattle, Washington
G	4	Tyler Thompson	6 ft 6 in (1.98 m)	195 lb (88 kg)	RS Fr	Vanden HS	Fairfield, California
G	5	Amari Jedkins	6 ft 7 in (2.01 m)	197 lb (89 kg)	RS Jr	Green Bay	Racine, Wisconsin
F	7	Kadyn Betts	6 ft 8 in (2.03 m)	219 lb (99 kg)	RS Jr	Minnesota	Pueblo, Colorado
G	8	Tyler Isaak	6 ft 4 in (1.93 m)	190 lb (86 kg)	Jr	Citrus College	Danville, California
G	10	Connor Dick	6 ft 3 in (1.91 m)	197 lb (89 kg)	RS So	Hellgate HS	Missoula, Montana
G	11	Grant Kepley	6 ft 4 in (1.93 m)	180 lb (82 kg)	RS So	Western Washington	Bellingham, Washington
G	13	Courtney Anderson Jr.	6 ft 5 in (1.96 m)	200 lb (91 kg)	RS So	Colorado	Vallejo, California
G	22	Luke Moxon	6 ft 3 in (1.91 m)	210 lb (95 kg)	Fr	Arcata HS	Arcata, California
G	24	Kenyon Aguino	6 ft 7 in (2.01 m)	222 lb (101 kg)	Fr	Volcano Vista HS	Albuquerque, New Mexico
F	32	Te'Jon Sawyer	6 ft 8 in (2.03 m)	255 lb (116 kg)	GS	City College of San Francisco	San Francisco, California

Head coach

- Travis DeCuire (Montana)

Assistant coach(es)

- Chris Cobb (Menlo)
- Jay Flores (Chico State)
- Rachi Wortham (Eastern Washington)
- Ryan Frazer (Azusa Pacific)
- Brian Morgan (Cal State East Bay)

Legend

- (C) Team captain
- (S) Suspended
- (I) Ineligible
- (W) Walk-on
- Injured
- Current redshirt

Roster
Last update: 2025-11-10

== Schedule and results ==
Date time, TV	Rank^{#}	Opponent^{#}	Result	Record	High points	High rebounds	High assists	Site (attendance) city, state
Non-conference regular season
November 3, 2025*; 7:00 p.m., ESPN+		Northwest Indian College	W 106–41	1–0	17 – Hicks	8 – Aguino	6 – Kepley	Dahlberg Arena (2,194); Missoula, MT
November 5, 2025*; 7:00 p.m., ESPN+		Ottawa (AZ)	W 73–39	2–0	15 – Williams	10 – Williams	6 – Williams	Dahlberg Arena (2,169); Missoula, MT
November 8, 2025*; 2:00 p.m., ACCNX		at Stanford	L 68–91	2–1	19 – Williams	7 – Tied	5 – Williams	Maples Pavilion (3,549); Stanford, CA
November 11, 2025*; 8:00 p.m., SSSEN/MW Network		at UNLV	W 102–93	3–1	30 – Williams	9 – Sawyer	8 – Williams	Thomas & Mack Center (5,553); Paradise, NV
November 14, 2025*; 7:00 p.m., ESPN+		Cal Poly	W 90–82	4–1	31 – Williams	7 – Isaak	6 – Williams	Dahlberg Arena (2,827); Missoula, MT
November 18, 2025*; 6:00 p.m., SECN+		at Texas A&M	L 81–86	4–2	22 – Williams	5 – Tied	7 – Tied	Reed Arena (6,304); College Station, TX
November 23, 2025*; 2:00 p.m., ESPN+		Lamar; Blaine Taylor Classic	L 63–68	4–3	15 – Tied	6 – Hicks	6 – Isaak	Dahlberg Arena (2,550); Missoula, MT
November 25, 2025*; 7:00 p.m., ESPN+		Oakland; Blaine Taylor Classic	L 87–95	4–4	24 – Aguino	16 – Aguino	15 – Williams	Dahlberg Arena (3,025); Missoula, MT
December 3, 2025*; 7:00 p.m., ESPN+		North Dakota State; Big Sky-Summit League Challenge	L 72–81	4–5	21 – Williams	6 – Tied	5 – Tied	Dahlberg Arena (2,580); Missoula, MT
December 6, 2025*; 6:00 p.m., SLN		at North Dakota; Big Sky-Summit League Challenge	W 79–75	5–5	30 – Williams	7 – Isaak	3 – Tied	Betty Engelstad Sioux Center (1,649); Grand Forks, ND
December 10, 2025*; 7:00 p.m., ESPN+		Salish Kootenai	W 102–46	6–5	16 – Isaak	9 – Hicks	11 – Williams	Dahlberg Arena (2,369); Missoula, MT
December 17, 2025*; 7:00 p.m., ESPN+		Montana Tech	L 75–82	6–6	23 – Sawyer	12 – Sawyer	5 – Isaak	Dahlberg Arena (2,602); Missoula, MT
December 20, 2025*; 10:00 a.m., ACCN		at No. 11 Louisville	L 54–94	6–7	15 – Kepley	5 – Williams	3 – Tied	KFC Yum! Center (14,076); Louisville, KY
Big Sky regular season
January 1, 2026; 4:00 p.m., ESPN+		Northern Arizona	W 78–64	7–7 (1–0)	15 – Hicks	6 – Tied	6 – Kepley	Dahlberg Arena (2,777); Missoula, MT
January 3, 2026; 4:00 p.m., ESPN+		Northern Colorado	W 88–79	8–7 (2–0)	31 – Williams	9 – Thompson	5 – Williams	Dahlberg Arena (3,430); Missoula, MT
January 8, 2026; 7:00 p.m., ESPN+		at Idaho	W 79–73	9–7 (3–0)	35 – Williams	5 – Thompson	5 – Williams	ICCU Arena (1,785); Moscow, ID
January 10, 2026; 3:00 p.m., ESPN+		at Eastern Washington	L 65–66	9–8 (3–1)	18 – Williams	7 – Tied	4 – Williams	Reese Court (2,343); Cheney, WA
January 17, 2026; 7:00 p.m., ESPN+		at Montana State; Rivalry	L 67–76	9–9 (3–2)	17 – Williams	5 – Tied	4 – Isaak	Worthington Arena (6,007); Bozeman, MT
January 19, 2026; 4:00 p.m., ESPN+		at Northern Arizona	W 98–72	10–9 (4–2)	27 – Sawyer	6 – Sawyer	6 – Williams	Findlay Toyota Court (653); Flagstaff, AZ
January 22, 2026; 7:00 p.m., ESPN+		Weber State	W 81–65	11–9 (5–2)	21 – Thompson	5 – Tied	6 – Williams	Dahlberg Arena (2,947); Missoula, MT
January 24, 2026; 4:00 p.m., ESPN+		Idaho State	W 69–60	12–9 (6–2)	17 – Williams	6 – Williams	5 – Tied	Dahlberg Arena (4,103); Missoula, MT
January 29, 2026; 8:00 p.m., ESPN+		at Portland State	W 64–60	13–9 (7–2)	24 – Williams	5 – Tied	2 – Tied	Viking Pavilion (1,462); Portland, OR
January 31, 2026; 8:00 p.m., ESPN+		at Sacramento State	L 79–86	13–10 (7–3)	31 – Sawyer	7 – Tied	8 – Williams	Hornet Pavilion (3,116); Sacramento, CA
February 5, 2026; 7:00 p.m., ESPN+		Eastern Washington	L 74–82	13–11 (7–4)	25 – Williams	5 – Tied	4 – Tied	Dahlberg Arena (2,699); Missoula, MT
February 7, 2026; 4:00 p.m., ESPN+		Idaho	W 73–68	14–11 (8–4)	14 – Williams	8 – Sawyer	5 – Kepley	Dahlberg Arena (3,018); Missoula, MT
February 14, 2026; 7:00 p.m., ESPN+		Montana State; Rivalry	L 71–82	14–12 (8–5)	25 – Williams	8 – Hicks	7 – Kepley	Dahlberg Arena (5,017); Missoula, MT
February 19, 2026; 7:00 p.m., ESPN+		at Idaho State	L 69–73	14–13 (8–6)	19 – Williams	6 – Tied	4 – Williams	Reed Gym (1,217); Pocatello, ID
February 21, 2026; 7:00 p.m., ESPN+		at Weber State	L 72–92	14–14 (8–7)	15 – Tied	5 – Williams	6 – Williams	Dee Events Center (3,975); Ogden, UT
February 26, 2026; 7:00 p.m., ESPN+		Sacramento State	W 81–73	15–14 (9–7)	20 – Williams	12 – Sawyer	5 – Kepley	Dahlberg Arena (3,174); Missoula, MT
February 28, 2026; 2:00 p.m., ESPN+		Portland State	W 74–68	16–14 (10–7)	27 – Williams	9 – Sawyer	7 – Williams	Dahlberg Arena (3,078); Missoula, MT
March 2, 2026; 6:00 p.m., ESPN+		at Northern Colorado	L 57–85	16–15 (10–8)	17 – Williams	6 – Tied	2 – Tied	Bank of Colorado Arena (2,016); Greeley, CO
Big Sky tournament
March 9, 2026; 5:30 p.m., ESPN+	(4)	vs. (5) Northern Colorado; Quarterfinal	W 95–89	17–15	40 – Williams	8 – Aguino	3 – Williams	Idaho Central Arena; Boise, ID
March 10, 2026; 6:00 p.m., ESPNU	(4)	vs. (1) Portland State; Semifinal	W 75–72	18–15	32 – Williams	9 – Sawyer	4 – Kepley	Idaho Central Arena; Boise, ID
March 11, 2026; 9:40 p.m., ESPN2	(4)	vs. (7) Idaho; Championship	L 66–77	18–16	19 – Tied	5 – Tied	2 – Tied	Idaho Central Arena; Boise, ID
*Non-conference game. ^{#}Rankings from AP Poll. (#) Tournament seedings in parentheses. All times are in Mountain Time.
