= 2025–26 Idaho Vandals men's basketball team =

American college basketball season

2025–26 Idaho Vandals men's basketball

Big Sky tournament champions

NCAA tournament, First round
- Conference: Big Sky Conference
- Record: 21–15 (9–9 Big Sky)
- Head coach: Alex Pribble (3rd season)
- Associate head coach: Brandon Laird (3rd season)
- Assistant coaches: Matt Jones (3rd season); Adam Ellis (3rd season); Luke Chavez (2nd season)
- Home arena: ICCU Arena (Capacity: 4,200)

2025–26 Big Sky men's basketball standings
	Conf.				Overall
Team	W		L	PCT	W		L	PCT
Portland State	13	–	5	.722	20	–	11	.645
Montana State	12	–	6	.667	18	–	14	.563
Eastern Washington	11	–	7	.611	14	–	19	.424
Montana	10	–	8	.556	18	–	16	.529
Northern Colorado	10	–	8	.556	20	–	12	.625
Weber State	10	–	8	.556	16	–	16	.500
Idaho †	9	–	9	.500	21	–	15	.583
Sacramento State	6	–	12	.333	10	–	21	.323
Idaho State	5	–	13	.278	13	–	20	.394
Northern Arizona	4	–	14	.222	10	–	22	.313
† Conference tournament winner

The 2025–26 Idaho Vandals men's basketball team represented the University of Idaho in the Big Sky Conference during the 2025–26 NCAA Division I men's basketball season. The Vandals were led by third-year head coach Alex Pribble and played their home games on campus at ICCU Arena in Moscow, Idaho.

== Previous season ==
The Vandals finished the 2024–25 season 14–19, 8–10 in Big Sky play to finish sixth in the conference. As the 6-seed in the Big Sky Tournament they defeated 3-seed Portland State in the Quarterfinals before falling to 2-seed Montana 78–55 in the Semifinals to end their season.

== Offseason ==
=== Departures ===
Name	Number	Pos.	Height	Weight	Year	Hometown	Reason for departure
Julius Mims	0	F	6'9"	190	Senior	Billings, MT	Transferred to New Mexico State
Tyler Mrus	2	F	6'7"	205	(redshirt) Sophomore	Bothell, WA	Transferred to BYU
Jojo Anderson	3	G	6'0"	180	(redshirt) Junior	Spokane, WA	Transferred to Eastern Washington
Jayden Stevens	4	G	6'7"	190	Junior	Spokane, WA	Entered transfer portal
Takai Hardy	23	G	6'7"	220	Sophomore	Fairfield, CA	Transferred to Cal State East Bay
Jack Hatten	33	G	6'6"	200	(redshirt) Junior	Bakersfield, CA	Departed program
Kyson Rose	34	F	6'9"	245	Senior	Kennewick, WA	Entered transfer portal

=== Incoming transfers ===
Name	Number	Pos.	Height	Weight	Year	Hometown	Previous college
Brody Rowbury	0	F	6'11"	255	Senior	Meridian, ID	Southeastern Louisiana
Trevon Blassingame	1	G	6'4"	180	(redshirt) Junior	Auburn, WA	FDU
Biko Johnson	3	G	6'2"	185	Senior	Carson, CA	Fort Lewis
Aiden Sevilla	4	G	6'0"	-	Graduate	San Ramon, CA	UC Merced
Seth Joba	21	F	6'9"	225	Junior	Orchard Park, NY	Vermont

=== 2025 recruiting class ===
College recruiting
Name	Hometown	School	Height	Weight	Commit date
Talon Jenkins; SG	Bellingham, WA	Meridian HS	6 ft 7 in (2.01 m)	N/A	May 12, 2025
Talon Jenkins; SG	Recruit ratings: No ratings found				
Will Jenson; PF	Bend, OR	Caldera HS	6 ft 9 in (2.06 m)	N/A	May 12, 2025
Will Jenson; PF	Recruit ratings: No ratings found				
Jackson Rasmussen; PF	Hurricane, UT	Utah Prep	6 ft 7 in (2.01 m)	200 lb (91 kg)	Nov 13, 2024
Jackson Rasmussen; PF	Recruit ratings: Rivals: 247Sports: ESPN: (NR)				
Overall recruit ranking: Scout: – Rivals: –
Note: In many cases, Scout, Rivals, 247Sports, On3, and ESPN may conflict in their listings of height and weight.; In these cases, the average was taken. ESPN grades are on a 100-point scale.; Sources: "2025 Idaho Basketball Recruiting Commits". Scout.; "Scout.com Team Recruiting Rankings". Scout.; "2025 Team Ranking". Rivals.

== Roster ==
2025–26 Idaho Vandals men's basketball team
Players
Coaches

Pos.	#	Name	Height	Weight	Year	Previous school	Hometown
F	0	Brody Rowbury	6 ft 11 in (2.11 m)	255 lb (116 kg)	Sr	Southeastern Louisiana	Meridian, Idaho
G	1	Trevon Blassingame	6 ft 4 in (1.93 m)	180 lb (82 kg)	RS Jr	FDU	Auburn, Washington
G	2	Talon Jenkins	6 ft 7 in (2.01 m)	—	Fr	Meridian HS	Bellingham, Washington
G	3	Biko Johnson	6 ft 2 in (1.88 m)	185 lb (84 kg)	Sr	Fort Lewis	Carson, California
G	4	Aiden Sevilla	6 ft 0 in (1.83 m)	—	GS	UC Merced	San Ramon, California
G	5	Isaiah Brickner	6 ft 4 in (1.93 m)	190 lb (86 kg)	Sr	Marist	San Diego, California
G	7	Jack Payne	6 ft 6 in (1.98 m)	195 lb (88 kg)	RS Jr	Colorado State	Boise, Idaho
G	10	Kristian Gonzalez	6 ft 3 in (1.91 m)	180 lb (82 kg)	Jr	Mater Dei Catholic HS	Chula Vista, California
G	11	Titus Yearout	6 ft 2 in (1.88 m)	180 lb (82 kg)	RS Jr	Lapwai HS	Lapwai, Idaho
F	12	Jackson Rasmussen	6 ft 7 in (2.01 m)	200 lb (91 kg)	Fr	Utah Prep Academy	Meridian, Idaho
G	14	Kolton Mitchell	6 ft 1 in (1.85 m)	170 lb (77 kg)	RS So	Idaho State	Coeur d'Alene, Idaho
F	15	Ewan Steele	6 ft 9 in (2.06 m)	220 lb (100 kg)	So	Polaris Prep	Alton, Ontario, Canada
F	21	Seth Joba	6 ft 9 in (2.06 m)	225 lb (102 kg)	Jr	Vermont	Orchard Park, New York
F	22	Tyler Linhardt	6 ft 7 in (2.01 m)	220 lb (100 kg)	Sr	Washington	Seattle, Washington
F	24	Miles Klapper	6 ft 3 in (1.91 m)	185 lb (84 kg)	RS So	Bridgton Academy	Hillsborough, California
F	34	Will Jenson	6 ft 9 in (2.06 m)	—	Fr	Caldera HS	Bend, Oregon

Head coach

- Alex Pribble (California)

Assistant coach(es)

- Brandon Laird (UC Davis)
- Matt Jones (Trinity (TX))
- Adam Ellis (Eastern Washington)
- Luke Chavez (Saint Martin's)

Legend

- (C) Team captain
- (S) Suspended
- (I) Ineligible
- (W) Walk-on
- Injured
- Current redshirt

Roster
Last update: 2025-10-31

== Schedule and results ==
Date time, TV	Rank^{#}	Opponent^{#}	Result	Record	High points	High rebounds	High assists	Site (attendance) city, state
Exhibition
October 17, 2025*; 6:00 p.m., KTVB		vs. Boise State	L 83–89		18 – Mitchell	7 – Tied	5 – Mitchell	Idaho Central Arena (4,164); Boise, ID
Non-conference regular season
November 3, 2025*; 6:30 p.m., ESPN+		at Washington State; Battle of the Palouse	W 83–81	1–0	18 – Gonzalez	6 – Tied	4 – Mitchell	Beasley Coliseum (3,588); Pullman, WA
November 7, 2025*; 6:00 p.m., ESPN+		Whitman	W 94–49	2–0	19 – Rasmussen	11 – Payne	6 – Mitchell	ICCU Arena (2,295); Moscow, ID
November 12, 2025*; 6:00 p.m., ESPN+		at San Diego	L 74–78	2–1	23 – Rasmussen	8 – Rowbury	6 – Mitchell	Jenny Craig Pavilion (456); San Diego, CA
November 15, 2025*; 1:00 p.m., ESPN+		at UC San Diego	L 67–75	2–2	18 – Mitchell	8 – Rasmussen	3 – Mitchell	LionTree Arena (2,486); San Diego, CA
November 22, 2025*; 6:00 p.m., ESPN+		Eastern Oregon	W 97–68	3–2	22 – Rasmussen	9 – Rowbury	5 – Rowbury	ICCU Arena (1,946); Moscow, ID
November 26, 2025*; 6:00 p.m., ESPN+		vs. Cal State Northridge; Holiday Hoops Classic	W 78–64	4–2	23 – Johnson	6 – Tied	5 – Mitchell	Idaho Central Arena; Boise, ID
November 28, 2025*; 6:00 p.m., ESPN+		vs. Sam Houston; Holiday Hoops Classic	L 68–94	4–3	14 – Payne	5 – Rowbury	5 – Johnson	Idaho Central Arena; Boise, ID
December 3, 2025*; 6:00 p.m., ESPN+		North Dakota; Big Sky-Summit League Challenge	W 90–58	5–3	26 – Brickner	8 – Joba	6 – Johnson	ICCU Arena (1,636); Moscow, ID
December 6, 2025*; 12:00 p.m., SLN		at South Dakota State; Big Sky-Summit League Challenge	W 84–81	6–3	22 – Mitchell	8 – Rowbury	4 – Tied	First Bank and Trust Arena (1,235); Brookings, SD
December 10, 2025*; 4:00 p.m., ACCNX		at Notre Dame	L 65–80	6–4	19 – Johnson	6 – Mitchell	2 – Tied	Joyce Center (3,687); South Bend, IN
December 14, 2025*; 2:00 p.m., ESPN+		Evergreen State	W 109–55	7–4	20 – Rasmussen	7 – Tied	5 – Tied	ICCU Arena (1,631); Moscow, ID
December 21, 2025*; 4:00 p.m., ESPN+		at Cal Poly	W 83–80 ^{OT}	8–4	31 – Mitchell	8 – Johnson	5 – Johnson	Mott Athletics Center (2,157); San Luis Obispo, CA
December 23, 2025*; 2:00 p.m., ESPN+		at Cal State Bakersfield	L 63–64	8–5	20 – Rowbury	9 – Rowbury	5 – Mitchell	Icardo Center (259); Bakersfield, CA
Big Sky regular season
January 3, 2026; 2:00 p.m., ESPN+		Eastern Washington	W 84–81	9–5 (1–0)	32 – Mitchell	8 – Rowbury	2 – Tied	ICCU Arena (2,083); Moscow, ID
January 8, 2026; 6:00 p.m., ESPN+		Montana	L 73–79	9–6 (1–1)	16 – Rasmussen	7 – Tied	2 – Tied	ICCU Arena (1,785); Moscow, ID
January 10, 2026; 2:00 p.m., ESPN+		Montana State	W 92–89	10–6 (2–1)	23 – Tied	8 – Rasmussen	4 – Mitchell	ICCU Arena (1,878); Moscow, ID
January 15, 2026; 6:00 p.m., ESPN+		at Idaho State; Battle of the Domes	L 68–76	10–7 (2–2)	19 – Rasmussen	6 – Rowbury	3 – Tied	Reed Gym (1,896); Pocatello, ID
January 17, 2026; 6:00 p.m., ESPN+		at Weber State	W 75–67	11–7 (3–2)	26 – Johnson	8 – Rowbury	4 – Mitchell	Dee Events Center (3,202); Ogden, UT
January 22, 2026; 6:00 p.m., ESPN+		Sacramento State	W 86–76	12–7 (4–2)	20 – Johnson	12 – Payne	5 – Mitchell	ICCU Arena (2,445); Moscow, ID
January 24, 2026; 2:00 p.m., ESPN+		Portland State	L 66–69	12–8 (4–3)	22 – Brickner	6 – Tied	6 – Mitchell	ICCU Arena (2,366); Moscow, ID
January 29, 2026; 6:00 p.m., ESPN+		at Northern Colorado	L 83–91	12–9 (4–4)	29 – Rasmussen	7 – Joba	3 – Tied	Bank of Colorado Arena (1,860); Greeley, CO
January 31, 2026; 5:00 p.m., ESPN+		at Northern Arizona	W 79–62	13–9 (5–4)	31 – Brickner	8 – Brickner	4 – Tied	Findlay Toyota Court (1,221); Flagstaff, AZ
February 5, 2026; 6:00 p.m., ESPN+		at Montana State	L 66–73	13–10 (5–5)	21 – Mitchell	9 – Brickner	3 – Johnson	Brick Breeden Fieldhouse (2,655); Bozeman, MT
February 7, 2026; 3:00 p.m., ESPN+		at Montana	L 68–73	13–11 (5–6)	22 – Johnson	6 – Johnson	5 – Mitchell	Dahlberg Arena (3,018); Missoula, MT
February 12, 2026; 6:00 p.m., ESPN+		Weber State	L 72–83	13–12 (5–7)	18 – Brickner	5 – Rowbury	3 – Mitchell	ICCU Arena (1,680); Moscow, ID
February 14, 2026; 2:00 p.m., ESPN+		Idaho State; Battle of the Domes	W 99–69	14–12 (6–7)	21 – Rasmussen	7 – Tied	7 – Mitchell	ICCU Arena (2,326); Moscow, ID
February 19, 2026; 7:00 p.m., ESPNU		at Portland State	L 67–77	14–13 (6–8)	22 – Brickner	6 – Tied	5 – Mitchell	Viking Pavilion (2,180); Portland, OR
February 21, 2026; 7:00 p.m., ESPN+		at Sacramento State	W 86–80	15–13 (7–8)	25 – Johnson	9 – Johnson	5 – Mitchell	Hornets Nest (2,895); Sacramento, CA
February 26, 2026; 6:00 p.m., ESPN+		Northern Arizona	W 78–58	16–13 (8–8)	19 – Rasmussen	7 – Rasmussen	3 – Klapper	ICCU Arena (1,744); Moscow, ID
February 28, 2026; 1:00 p.m., ESPN+		Northern Colorado	L 67–76	16–14 (8–9)	15 – Tied	8 – Rowbury	3 – Sevilla	ICCU Arena (2,459); Moscow, ID
March 2, 2026; 6:00 p.m., ESPN+		at Eastern Washington	W 85–81	17–14 (9–9)	14 – Rasmussen	8 – Rasmussen	4 – Tied	Reese Court (1,729); Cheney, WA
Big Sky tournament
March 7, 2026; 7:00 p.m., ESPN+	(7)	vs. (8) Sacramento State; First round	W 68–45	18–14	19 – Rasmussen	8 – Johnson	3 – Mitchell	Idaho Central Arena; Boise, ID
March 8, 2026; 7:00 p.m., ESPN+	(7)	vs. (2) Montana State; Quarterfinal	W 78–74	19–14	19 – Johnson	7 – Brickner	4 – Johnson	Idaho Central Arena; Boise, ID
March 10, 2026; 8:50 p.m., ESPN2	(7)	vs. (3) Eastern Washington; Semifinal	W 81–68	20–14	26 – Mitchell	7 – Mitchell	3 – Mitchell	Idaho Central Arena; Boise, ID
March 11, 2026; 8:40 p.m., ESPN2	(7)	vs. (4) Montana; Championship	W 77–66	21–14	23 – Brickner	10 – Brickner	3 – Mitchell	Idaho Central Arena; Boise, ID
NCAA Tournament
March 19, 2026*; 7:10 p.m., truTV	(15 S)	vs. (2 S) No. 5 Houston; First round	L 47–78	21–15	14 – Mitchell	6 – Johnson	2 – Tied	Paycom Center (13,815); Oklahoma City, OK
*Non-conference game. ^{#}Rankings from AP Poll. (#) Tournament seedings in parentheses. S=South. All times are in Pacific Time.
