= Alex Pribble =

American basketball coach (born 1985)

Current position
- Title: Head coach
- Team: Idaho
- Conference: Big Sky
- Record: 49–58 (.458)

Biographical details
- Born: April 5, 1985 (age 41); Greenbrae, California, U.S.

Playing career
- 2003–2007: California
- Position: Guard

Coaching career (HC unless noted)
- 2007–2008: California (GA)
- 2008–2011: Tamalpais HS
- 2011–2013: San Francisco State (assistant)
- 2013–2015: Eastern Washington (assistant)
- 2015–2019: Saint Martin's
- 2019–2023: Seattle (assistant)
- 2023–present: Idaho

Head coaching record
- Overall: 132–98 (.574)
- Tournaments: 0–1 (NCAA DI); 3–2 (NCAA DII)

Accomplishments and honors

Championships
- GNAC regular season (2019); Big Sky tournament (2026)

Alexander Reed Pribble (born April 5, 1985) is an American basketball coach who is the current head coach of the Idaho Vandals men's basketball team.

== Playing career ==
Born in Greenbrae, California and raised in nearby Fairfax, Pribble graduated from Sir Francis Drake High School in 2003 and played college basketball at California under Ben Braun, initially as a walk-on before earning a scholarship. He was part of the Golden Bears' 2006 NCAA Tournament squad, and graduated in 2007 with a bachelor's degree in sociology.

== Coaching career ==
Following graduation, Pribble served as a graduate assistant at Cal before becoming the head boys' basketball coach at Tamalpais High School in Mill Valley, California from 2008 to 2011, where he guided the school to its first playoff berth in eight years during the 2009–10 season. Pribble returned to the college ranks at San Francisco State in NCAA Division II, then to Eastern Washington in Division I. During the 2014–15 season, he was part of the Eagles' Big Sky Conference regular season co-champions and conference tournament championship, which earned them a berth in the NCAA tournament.

His first college head coaching job came in 2015 at Saint Martin's University in Lacey, Washington. In four seasons at the helm, Pribble guided the Saints to an 83–40 (.675) record, and the program's first two appearances in the NCAA Division II tournament, including a Sweet 16 appearance in 2019.

Following the 2019 season, Pribble joined the staff at Seattle University, serving under head coaches Jim Hayford and Chris Victor. On March 16, 2023, the University of Idaho named Pribble as head coach, the 31st in program history, replacing Zac Claus.

== Head coaching record ==
Record table
Season	Team	Overall	Conference	Standing	Postseason
Saint Martin's Saints (Great Northwest Athletic Conference) (2015–2019)
2015–16	Saint Martin's	15–13	9–11	7th	
2016–17	Saint Martin's	17–13	10–10	4th	
2017–18	Saint Martin's	25–8	15–5	3rd	NCAA Division II Second Round
2018–19	Saint Martin's	26–6	17–3	1st	NCAA Division II Sweet 16
Saint Martin's:		83–40 (.675)	51–29 (.638)		
Idaho Vandals (Big Sky Conference) (2023–present)
2023–24	Idaho	11–21	5–13	9th	
2024–25	Idaho	14–19	8–10	T–6th	
2025–26	Idaho	21–15	9–9	7th	NCAA Division I Round of 64
2026–27	Idaho	3-3			
Idaho:		49–58 (.458)	22–32 (.407)		
Total:		132–98 (.574)			
National champion Postseason invitational champion Conference regular season champion Conference regular season and conference tournament champion Division regular season champion Division regular season and conference tournament champion Conference tournament champion
