= 2025–26 Montana State Bobcats men's basketball team =

American college basketball season

2025–26 Montana State Bobcats men's basketball
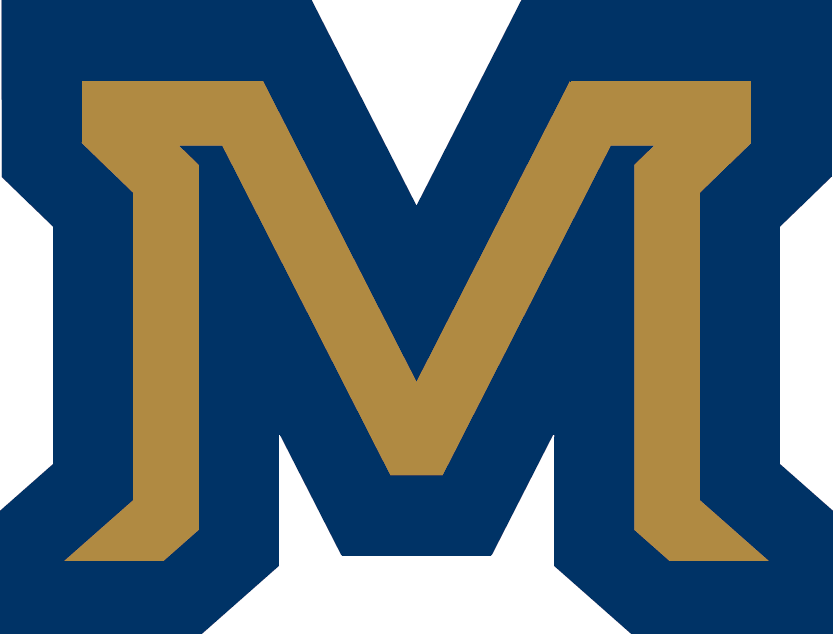
- Conference: Big Sky Conference
- Record: 18–14 (12–6 Big Sky)
- Head coach: Matt Logie (3rd season)
- Assistant coaches: Zach Payne (3rd season); Sam Scholl (3rd season); Xavier Bishop (2nd season)
- Home arena: Worthington Arena (Capacity: 8,455)

2025–26 Big Sky men's basketball standings
	Conf.				Overall
Team	W		L	PCT	W		L	PCT
Portland State	13	–	5	.722	20	–	11	.645
Montana State	12	–	6	.667	18	–	14	.563
Eastern Washington	11	–	7	.611	14	–	19	.424
Montana	10	–	8	.556	18	–	16	.529
Northern Colorado	10	–	8	.556	20	–	12	.625
Weber State	10	–	8	.556	16	–	16	.500
Idaho †	9	–	9	.500	21	–	14	.600
Sacramento State	6	–	12	.333	10	–	21	.323
Idaho State	5	–	13	.278	13	–	20	.394
Northern Arizona	4	–	14	.222	10	–	22	.313
† 2026 Big Sky tournament winner As of March 11, 2026

The 2025–26 Montana State Bobcats men's basketball team represented Montana State University during the 2025–26 NCAA Division I men's basketball season. The Bobcats were led by third-year head coach Matt Logie and played their home games at Worthington Arena in Bozeman, Montana as a member of the Big Sky Conference.

== Previous season ==
The Montana State finished the 2025-26 season 15–18, 9–9 in Big Sky play to finish fifth in the conference. As the 5-seed in the Big Sky Tournament they bested 4-seed Idaho State 83-70 in the Quarterfinals before falling to 1-seed Northern Colorado in the Seminals 45–72 to end their season.

== Offseason ==
=== Departures ===
Name	Number	Pos.	Height	Weight	Year	Hometown	Reason for departure
Brandon Walker	2	F	6'7"	250	Junior	Oak Cliff, TX	Transferred to Mississippi State
Jabe Mullins	3	G	6'6"	200	Graduate	Snoqualmie, WA	Out of eligibility
Bryce Zephir	5	G	6'4"	195	Junior	Carson, CA	Transferred to Syracuse
Max Agbonkpolo	7	F	6'9"	194	Graduate	Laguna Niguel, CA	Out of eligibility
BJ Kolly	8	F	6'10"	225	Junior	Everett, WA	Transferred to UC Riverside
Trap Johnson	10	G	6'6"	195	Freshman	Belton, TX	Transferred to UC San Diego
Tyler Patterson	11	G	6'8"	190	Graduate	Snoqualmie, WA	Out of eligibility
Myles Moskowitz	14	G	5'11"	145	Freshman	Boulder, CO	Transferred to Laramie County CC
Brian Goracke	21	G	6'6"	210	Senior	Monroe, OR	Out of eligibility
Chika Nduka	23	F	6'5"	225	Senior	Seattle, WA	Out of eligibility
Sam Lecholat	25	F	6'7"	215	Senior	Sheridan, WY	Out of eligibility

=== Incoming transfers ===
Name	Number	Pos.	Height	Weight	Year	Hometown	Previous college
Davian Brown	0	G	6'3"	180	Graduate	Pasadena, CA	Biola
Cavin Holden	4	G	6'2"	175	Junior	Longview, WA	Central Washington
Christian King	7	F	6'8"	210	(redshirt) Sophomore	Kirkland, WA	Washington
Seth Amunrud	12	G	6'3"	175	Junior	Bozeman, MT	Dawson CC
Chris Hodges	21	F	6'9"	240	Graduate	Schaumburg, IL	Wisconsin
Waka Mbatch	35	F	6'10"	225	(redshirt) Sophomore	Serekunda, The Gambia	Florida State
Jaden Steppe	44	F	6'8"	220	Sophomore	Tualatin, OR	Colorado State

=== 2025 recruiting class ===
College recruiting information
Name	Hometown	School	Height	Weight	Commit date
Howie Keene; SF	The Woodlands, TX	The Woodlands Christian	6 ft 5 in (1.96 m)	185 lb (84 kg)	Nov 14, 2024
Howie Keene; SF	Recruit ratings: 247Sports:				
CJ Purdie; CG	Charlotte, NC	Combine Academy	6 ft 2 in (1.88 m)	165 lb (75 kg)	Oct 25, 2024
CJ Purdie; CG	Recruit ratings: 247Sports:				
James Steward; PF	Tempe, AZ	Marcos de Niza HS	6 ft 8 in (2.03 m)	210 lb (95 kg)	May 20, 2025
James Steward; PF	Recruit ratings: No ratings found				
Overall recruit ranking: Scout: – Rivals: –
Note: In many cases, Scout, Rivals, 247Sports, On3, and ESPN may conflict in their listings of height and weight.; In these cases, the average was taken. ESPN grades are on a 100-point scale.; Sources: "2025 Montana State Basketball Recruiting Commits". Scout.; "Scout.com Team Recruiting Rankings". Scout.; "2025 Team Ranking". Rivals.

== Roster ==
2025–26 Montana State Bobcats men's basketball team
Players
Coaches

Pos.	#	Name	Height	Weight	Year	Previous school	Hometown
G	0	Davian Brown	6 ft 3 in (1.91 m)	180 lb (82 kg)	GS	Biola	Pasadena, California
G	1	Patrick McMahon	6 ft 7 in (2.01 m)	200 lb (91 kg)	RS Sr	Colony HS	Palmer, Alaska
G	2	Howie Keene	6 ft 7 in (2.01 m)	195 lb (88 kg)	Fr	The Woodlands Christian Academy	The Woodlands, Texas
G	3	CJ Purdie	6 ft 4 in (1.93 m)	185 lb (84 kg)	Fr	Combine Academy	Davidson, North Carolina
G	4	Cavin Holden	6 ft 2 in (1.88 m)	175 lb (79 kg)	Jr	Central Washington	Longview, Washington
G	5	Jeremiah Davis	6 ft 4 in (1.93 m)	185 lb (84 kg)	RS Jr	Fullerton College	Compton, California
F	7	Christian King	6 ft 8 in (2.03 m)	210 lb (95 kg)	RS So	Washington	Kirkland, Washington
G	12	Seth Amunrud	6 ft 3 in (1.91 m)	175 lb (79 kg)	Jr	Dawson CC	Bozeman, Montana
F	14	James Steward	6 ft 8 in (2.03 m)	210 lb (95 kg)	Fr	Marcos de Niza HS	Chandler, Arizona
G	15	Grayson Gaddis	6 ft 7 in (2.01 m)	215 lb (98 kg)	RS Fr	Highland HS	Salt Lake City, Utah
F	21	Chris Hodges	6 ft 9 in (2.06 m)	240 lb (109 kg)	GS	Wisconsin	Schaumburg, Illinois
F	22	Calum Rutherfurd	6 ft 11 in (2.11 m)	225 lb (102 kg)	RS So	Analy HS	Sebastopol, California
G	24	Jed Miller	6 ft 2 in (1.88 m)	185 lb (84 kg)	Sr	Agoura HS	Agoura Hills, California
F	35	Waka Mbatch	6 ft 10 in (2.08 m)	225 lb (102 kg)	RS So	Florida State	Serekunda, The Gambia
F	44	Jaden Steppe	6 ft 8 in (2.03 m)	220 lb (100 kg)	So	Colorado State	Tualatin, Oregon

Head coach

- Matt Logie (Lehigh)

Assistant coach(es)

- Zach Payne (Whitworth)
- Sam Scholl (San Diego)
- Xavier Bishop (Montana State)

Legend

- (C) Team captain
- (S) Suspended
- (I) Ineligible
- (W) Walk-on
- Injured
- Current redshirt

Roster
Last update: 2025-11-06

== Schedule and results ==
Date time, TV	Rank^{#}	Opponent^{#}	Result	Record	High points	High rebounds	High assists	Site (attendance) city, state
Non-conference regular season
November 3, 2025*; 7:00 p.m., ESPN+		at Colorado	L 78–84	0–1	24 – McMahon	5 – Hodges	3 – Holden	CU Events Center (5,771); Boulder, CO
November 5, 2025*; 7:00 p.m., ESPN+		Northwest Indian College	W 114–44	1–1	26 – Brown	8 – Mbatch	5 – Miller	Worthington Arena (2,262); Bozeman, MT
November 9, 2025*; 1:00 p.m., ESPN+		Denver	L 73–75	1–2	16 – Tied	5 – Tied	3 – Tied	Worthington Arena (2,591); Bozeman, MT
November 12, 2025*; 8:00 p.m., ACCNX		at Stanford	L 68–77	1–3	14 – King	9 – Miller	2 – Tied	Maples Pavilion (2,334); Stanford, CA
November 15, 2025*; 2:00 p.m., MW Network		at Boise State	L 58–62	1–4	16 – Brown	6 – McMahon	1 – Tied	ExtraMile Arena (9,780); Boise, ID
November 20, 2025*; 4:00 p.m.		vs. Nobel; Battle at the Beach	W 92–55	2–4	14 – King	6 – King	4 – Miller	Walter Pyramid; Los Angeles, CA
November 21, 2025*; 8:00 p.m., ESPN+		at Long Beach State; Battle at the Beach	W 78–72	3–4	15 – Davis	8 – McMahon	3 – Tied	Walter Pyramid (1,808); Long Beach, CA
November 29, 2025*; 2:00 p.m., ESPN+		at Utah State	L 81–84 ^{OT}	3–5	26 – McMahon	8 – McMahon	3 – McMahon	Smith Spectrum (8,189); Logan, UT
December 3, 2025*; 7:00 p.m., ESPN+		St. Thomas; Big Sky-Summit League Challenge	W 82–74	4–5	24 – McMahon	7 – McMahon	5 – McMahon	Worthington Arena (2,543); Bozeman, MT
December 6, 2025*; 6:00 p.m., GEBN		at Oral Roberts; Big Sky-Summit League Challenge	L 68–72	4–6	21 – Brown	9 – Hodges	3 – Tied	Mabee Center (3,568); Tulsa, OK
December 13, 2025*; 3:00 p.m., ESPN+		at Oregon State	L 57–67	4–7	17 – McMahon	7 – McMahon	2 – Tied	Gill Coliseum (2,292); Corvallis, OR
December 16, 2025*; 8:00 p.m., ESPN+		at Cal Poly	W 83–80	5–7	26 – McMahon	8 – King	5 – McMahon	Mott Athletics Center (1,234); San Luis Obispo, CA
December 22, 2025*; 1:00 p.m., ESPN+		Northwest	W 93–54	6–7	12 – Tied	11 – Davis	4 – Brown	Worthington Arena; Bozeman, MT
Big Sky regular season
January 1, 2026; 7:00 p.m., ESPN+		Northern Colorado	W 89–75	7–7 (1–0)	24 – Miller	6 – Miller	3 – King	Worthington Arena (2,829); Bozeman, MT
January 3, 2026; 6:00 p.m., ESPN+		Northern Arizona	W 77–68	8–7 (2–0)	22 – Miller	9 – King	3 – Tied	Worthington Arena (3,016); Bozeman, MT
January 8, 2026; 7:00 p.m., ESPN+		at Eastern Washington	W 68–64	9–7 (3–0)	20 – McMahon	11 – Hodges	4 – Miller	Reese Court (1,534); Cheney, WA
January 10, 2026; 3:00 p.m., ESPN+		at Idaho	L 89–92	9–8 (3–1)	20 – Miller	6 – Tied	4 – Miller	ICCU Arena (1,878); Moscow, ID
January 17, 2026; 7:00 p.m., ESPN+		Montana; Rivalry	W 76–67	10–8 (4–1)	24 – Brown	11 – Miller	4 – Miller	Worthington Arena (6,007); Bozeman, MT
January 19, 2026; 6:00 p.m., ESPN+		at Northern Colorado	W 73–68	11–8 (5–1)	16 – Brown	7 – King	2 – Tied	Bank of Colorado Arena (1,362); Greeley, CO
January 22, 2026; 7:00 p.m., ESPN+		Idaho State	W 74–62	12–8 (6–1)	20 – Miller	9 – McMahon	4 – Miller	Worthington Arena (2,885); Bozeman, MT
January 24, 2026; 6:00 p.m., ESPN+		Weber State	W 91–88	18–8 (7–1)	27 – Miller	11 – Hodges	3 – Miller	Worthington Arena (3,782); Bozeman, MT
January 29, 2026; 8:00 p.m., ESPN+		at Sacramento State	L 80–83	18–9 (7–2)	25 – Miller	11 – Miller	5 – Miller	Hornet Pavilion (2,826); Sacramento, CA
January 31, 2026; 3:00 p.m., ESPN+		at Portland State	L 54–63	18–10 (7–3)	16 – Tied	7 – Tied	2 – Tied	Viking Pavilion (1,795); Portland, OR
February 5, 2026; 7:00 p.m., ESPN+		Idaho	W 73–66	19–10 (8–3)	15 – Miller	7 – Hodges	2 – Miller	Worthington Arena (2,655); Bozeman, MT
February 7, 2026; 6:00 p.m., ESPN+		Eastern Washington	L 71–72	19–11 (8–4)	14 – Tied	6 – Hodges	6 – McMahon	Worthington Arena (3,272); Bozeman, MT
February 14, 2026; 7:00 p.m., ESPN+		at Montana; Rivalry	W 82–71	20–11 (9–4)	19 – Miller	10 – King	5 – Miller	Dahlberg Arena (5,017); Missoula, MT
February 19, 2026; 7:00 p.m., ESPN+		at Weber State	L 79–82 ^{OT}	20–12 (9–5)	17 – Davis	8 – Miller	5 – Miller	Dee Events Center (4,011); Ogden, UT
February 21, 2026; 4:00 p.m., ESPN+		at Idaho State	L 76–91	20–13 (9–6)	35 – McMahon	5 – King	3 – Tied	Reed Gym (1,686); Pocatello, ID
February 26, 2026; 7:00 p.m., ESPN+		Portland State	W 84–69	21–13 (10–6)	25 – Miller	9 – Miller	6 – Miller	Worthington Arena (3,346); Bozeman, MT
February 28, 2026; 1:00 p.m., ESPN+		at Sacramento State	W 82–61	22–13 (11–6)	21 – Amunrud	11 – Keene	6 – Miller	Worthington Arena (3,503); Bozeman, MT
March 2, 2026; 6:00 p.m., ESPN+		at Northern Arizona	W 76–65	18–13 (12–6)	18 – King	8 – Miller	3 – Miller	Findlay Toyota Court (711); Flagstaff, AZ
Big Sky tournament
March 8, 2026; 8:00 pm, ESPN+	(2)	vs. (7) Idaho; Quarterfinals	L 74–78	18–14	22 – Davis	6 – Davis	4 – Steppe	Idaho Central Arena; Boise, ID
*Non-conference game. ^{#}Rankings from AP Poll. (#) Tournament seedings in parentheses. All times are in Mountain Time.
