= 2025–26 Northern Arizona Lumberjacks men's basketball team =

American college basketball season

2025–26 Northern Arizona Lumberjacks men's basketball
- Conference: Big Sky Conference
- Record: 10–22 (4–14 Big Sky)
- Head coach: Shane Burcar (7th season)
- Associate head coach: Gary Bell Jr.
- Assistant coaches: Tim Russo; Jack Mitchell
- Home arena: Rolle Activity Center; Findlay Toyota Court

2025–26 Big Sky men's basketball standings
	Conf.				Overall
Team	W		L	PCT	W		L	PCT
Portland State	13	–	5	.722	19	–	10	.655
Montana State	12	–	6	.667	18	–	13	.581
Eastern Washington	11	–	7	.611	13	–	18	.419
Montana	10	–	8	.556	16	–	15	.516
Northern Colorado	10	–	8	.556	20	–	11	.645
Weber State	10	–	8	.556	16	–	15	.516
Idaho	9	–	9	.500	18	–	14	.563
Sacramento State	6	–	12	.333	10	–	21	.323
Idaho State	5	–	13	.278	13	–	19	.406
Northern Arizona	4	–	14	.222	10	–	22	.313
† 2026 Big Sky tournament winner As of March 7, 2026

The 2025–26 Northern Arizona Lumberjacks men's basketball team represented Northern Arizona University during the 2025–26 NCAA Division I men's basketball season. The Lumberjacks, led by seventh-year head coach Shane Burcar, played their home games at the Rolle Activity Center and Findlay Toyota Court, both located in Flagstaff, Arizona as members of the Big Sky Conference.

== Previous season ==
The Lumberjacks finished the 2023–24 season 18–16, 8–10 in Big Sky play to finish in a tie for sixth place. The defeated Eastern Washington in the first round of the Big Sky tournament. The Lumberjacks were defeated in their quarterfinal matchup against Montana. Northern Arizona was invited to play in the inaugural CBI, a single-elimination, fully-bracketed men's college basketball postseason tournament featuring eight National Collegiate Athletic Association (NCAA) Division I teams not selected to participate in the NCAA Division I men's basketball tournament. They were defeated in their first round game against Queens (NC) 85−78.

== Offseason ==
=== Departures ===
Departures
Name	Number	Pos.	Height	Weight	Year	Hometown	Notes
C.J. Ford	G	0	6'0"	185	Senior	Crowley, Texas	Transferred to University of Arkansas–Fort Smith
Arman Madi	G	1	6'6"	220	Junior	Paradise Valley, Arizona	Transferred to Sacramento State
Monty Bowser	G/F	2	6'7"	205	Senior	Oakland, California	Out of eligibility
Jayden Jackson	G	3	6'4"	205	Graduate Senior	Milwaukee, Wisconsin	Transferred to Cal Baptist
Tyler Hutton	G	6	6'4"	200	Sophomore	Santa Cruz, California	Transferred
Jack Wistrcill	F	10	6'8"	225	Junior	Salt Lake City, Utah	Transferred to Point Loma Nazarene
Dillan Baker	G	21	6'6"	215	Senior	Tucson, Arizona	Transferred to Adams State
Ali Ragab	C	22	7'0"	275	Senior	Cairo, Egypt	Out of eligibility
Trent McLaughlin	G	24	6'6"	200	Senior	Chandler, Arizona	Out of eligibility
Carson Towt	F	33	6'8"	235	Graduate Senior	Gilbert, Arizona	Transferred to Notre Dame
Leigh Rickwood-Pitt	F	34	6'10"	200	Senior	Busselton, Australia	Out of eligibility

=== Incoming transfers ===
Incoming transfers
Name	Number	Pos.	Height	Weight	Year	Hometown	Previous School
Traivar Jackon	3	F	6'7"	215	Graduate Senior	Anchorage, Alaska	Grand Canyon
Zack Davidson	5	F	6'9"	225	(redshirt) Sophomore	Mission Viejo, California	Montana
Walker Timme	8	F	6'7"	225	(redshirt) Junior	Richardson, Texas	College of Southern Idaho
Karl Poom	9	F	6'8"	230	Sophomore	Tartu, Estonia	San Francisco
Kavon Bradford	22	G	6'1"	180	Sophomore	Portland, Oregon	Buffalo
Isaiah Shaw	24	G	6'8"	200	(redshirt) Junior	Gilbert, Arizona	Valparaiso
Arne Osojnik	44	G	6'6"	200	Junior	Ljubljana, Slovenia	Eastern Michigan

=== Recruiting class ===
College recruiting information
Name	Hometown	School	Height	Weight	Commit date
JT Amundsen; G	Goodyear, Arizona	Millennium High School (AZ)	5 ft 8 in (1.73 m)	160 lb (73 kg)	May 23, 2025
JT Amundsen; G	Recruit ratings: Scout: Rivals: 247Sports: (NA)				
Chris Komin; G	Cypress, California	St. John Bosco High School	6 ft 3 in (1.91 m)	160 lb (73 kg)	May 15, 2025
Chris Komin; G	Recruit ratings: Scout: Rivals: 247Sports: (NA)				
Brennan Peterson; G	Scottsdale, Arizona	Dream City Christian	6 ft 0 in (1.83 m)	165 lb (75 kg)	May 22, 2025
Brennan Peterson; G	Recruit ratings: Scout: Rivals: 247Sports: (NA)				
Erez Poran; G	Kfar Vradim, Israel	Hapoel Emek Hefer	6 ft 6 in (1.98 m)	200 lb (91 kg)	May 21, 2025
Erez Poran; G	Recruit ratings: Scout: Rivals: 247Sports: (NA)				
Overall recruit ranking: Scout: NA Rivals: NA ESPN: NA
Note: In many cases, Scout, Rivals, 247Sports, On3, and ESPN may conflict in their listings of height and weight.; In these cases, the average was taken. ESPN grades are on a 100-point scale.; Sources: "2025 Northern Arizona Basketball Commits". ESPN.; "2025 Team Ranking". Rivals.

== Roster ==
2025–26 Northern Arizona Lumberjacks men's basketball team
Players
Coaches

Pos.	#	Name	Height	Weight	Year	Previous school	Hometown
G	0	JT Amundsen	5 ft 8 in (1.73 m)	160 lb (73 kg)	Fr	Millennium High School (AZ)	Goodyear, Arizona
G	2	Chris Komin	6 ft 3 in (1.91 m)	160 lb (73 kg)	Fr	St. John Bosco High School	Cypress, California
F	3	Traivar Jackson	6 ft 7 in (2.01 m)	215 lb (98 kg)	GS	Grand Canyon	Anchorage, Alaska
G	4	Oakland Fort	5 ft 10 in (1.78 m)	170 lb (77 kg)	Sr	Sunnyslope High School	Phoenix, Arizona
F	5	Zack Davidson	6 ft 9 in (2.06 m)	225 lb (102 kg)	RS So	Montana	Mission Viejo, California
G	7	Brennan Peterson	6 ft 0 in (1.83 m)	165 lb (75 kg)	Fr	Dream City Christian	Scottsdale, Arizona
F	8	Walker Timme	6 ft 7 in (2.01 m)	225 lb (102 kg)	RS Jr	College of Southern Idaho	Richardson, Texas
F	9	Karl Poom	6 ft 8 in (2.03 m)	230 lb (104 kg)	So	San Francisco	Tartu, Estonia
G	11	Ryan Abelman	6 ft 4 in (1.93 m)	200 lb (91 kg)	RS Jr	Bishop Gorman High School	Las Vegas, Nevada
F	12	Diego Campisano	6 ft 6 in (1.98 m)	205 lb (93 kg)	RS Sr	Torrey Pines High School	San Diego, California
G	22	Kavon Bradford	6 ft 1 in (1.85 m)	180 lb (82 kg)	So	Buffalo	Portland, Oregon
G	24	Isaiah Shaw	6 ft 8 in (2.03 m)	200 lb (91 kg)	RS Jr	Valparaiso	Gilbert, Arizona
G	44	Arne Osojnik	6 ft 6 in (1.98 m)	200 lb (91 kg)	Jr	Eastern Michigan	Ljubljana, Slovenia
G	82	Erez Poran	6 ft 6 in (1.98 m)	200 lb (91 kg)	Fr	Hapoel Emek Hefer	Kfar Vradim, Israel

Head coach

- Shane Burcar (Ottawa)

Assistant coach(es)

- Gary Bell Jr. (Gonzaga)
- Tim Russo (Tampa)
- Jack Mitchell (UCLA)

Legend

- (C) Team captain
- (S) Suspended
- (I) Ineligible
- (W) Walk-on
- Injured
- Current redshirt

Roster
Last update: November 7, 2025

== Schedule and results ==
Date time, TV	Rank^{#}	Opponent^{#}	Result	Record	High points	High rebounds	High assists	Site (attendance) city, state
Exhibition
October 30, 2025*; 6:00 pm		at New Mexico	L 54–64	–	12 – Tied	11 – Osojnik	4 – Peterson	The Pit (9,728); Albuquerque, NM
Non-conference regular season
November 3, 2025*; 2:00 pm, YouTube		vs. Drake; Field of 68 Opening Day Marathon	L 71–77	0–1	29 – Davidson	9 – Tied	5 – Osojnik	Sanford Pentagon (1,420); Sioux Falls, SD
November 7, 2025*; 6:00 pm, ESPN+		Justice	W 87–55	1–1	21 – Davidson	9 – Jackson	6 – Abelman	Rolle Activity Center (522); Flagstaff, AZ
November 11, 2025*; 7:00 pm, ESPN+		at No. 5 Arizona	L 49–84	1–2	10 – Jackson	6 – Osojnik	3 – Osojnik	McKale Center (13,740); Tucson, AZ
November 18, 2025*; 6:00 pm, ESPN+		Embry–Riddle	W 108–79	2–2	20 – Shaw	8 – Jackson	4 – Bradford	Rolle Activity Center (321); Flagstaff, AZ
November 24, 2025*; 6:00 pm, ESPN+		Cal Poly; Northern Arizona MTE	W 93–87	3–2	22 – Shaw	12 – Abelman	6 – Bradford	Rolle Activity Center (344); Flagstaff, AZ
November 26, 2025*; 6:00 pm, ESPN+		Southeast Missouri State; Northern Arizona MTE	W 79–72	4–2	20 – Abelman	8 – Davidson	4 – Bradford	Rolle Activity Center (231); Flagstaff, AZ
December 3, 2025*; 6:00 pm, ESPN+		South Dakota State; Big Sky–Summit League Challenge	L 62–75	4–3	16 – Osojnik	7 – Poom	3 – Tied	Rolle Activity Center (453); Flagstaff, AZ
December 6, 2025*; 6:00 pm, ESPN+		at North Dakota State; Big Sky–Summit League Challenge	L 68–69	4–4	20 – Davidson	8 – Osojnik	5 – Bradford	Scheels Center (1,537); Fargo, ND
December 9, 2025*; 7:00 pm, ESPN+		at Arizona State	L 48–73	4–5	21 – Shaw	7 – Abelman	2 – Osojnik	Desert Financial Arena (7,250); Tempe, AZ
December 13, 2025*; 4:00 pm, ESPN+		at San Diego	L 69–78	4–6	19 – Davidson	7 – Jackson	4 – Abelman	Jenny Craig Pavilion (1,119); San Diego, CA
December 18, 2025*; 5:00 pm, ESPN+		Southern Utah	W 65–57	5–6	24 – Abelman	7 – Poom	2 – Tied	Findlay Toyota Court (412); Flagstaff, AZ
December 21, 2025*; 1:00 pm, ESPN+		at Incarnate Word	L 66–90	5–7	16 – Abelman	6 – Tied	3 – Bradford	McDermott Center (231); San Antonio, Texas
December 29, 2025*; 6:00 pm, ESPN+		Benedictine Mesa	W 112–60	6–7	23 – Peterson	9 – Abelman	5 – Bradford	Findlay Toyota Court (535); Flagstaff, AZ
Big Sky regular season
January 1, 2026; 4:00 pm, ESPN+		at Montana	L 64–78	6–8 (0–1)	13 – Abelman	10 – Jackson	5 – Peterson	Dahlberg Arena (2,777); Missoula, MT
January 4, 2025; 6:00 pm, ESPN+		at Montana State	L 68–77	6–9 (0–2)	18 – Shaw	6 – Jackson	3 – Tied	Worthington Arena (3,016); Bozeman, MT
January 8, 2026; 6:00 pm, ESPN+		Weber State	L 65–78	6–10 (0–3)	16 – Jackson	9 – Jackson	6 – Komin	Findlay Toyota Court (273); Flagstaff, AZ
January 10, 2026; 6:00 pm, ESPN+		Idaho State	L 79–81	6–11 (0–4)	22 – Poom	7 – Abelman	8 – Peterson	Findlay Toyota Court (642); Flagstaff, AZ
January 15, 2026; 6:00 pm, ESPN+		at Sacramento State	L 69–83	6–12 (0–5)	18 – Jackson	5 – Jackson	7 – Abelman	Hornets Nest (2,298); Sacramento, CA
January 17, 2026; 3:00 pm, ESPN+		at Portland State	L 52–63	6–13 (0–6)	11 – Tied	6 – Osojnik	4 – Peterson	Viking Pavilion (922); Portland, OR
January 19, 2026; 6:00 pm, ESPN+		Montana	L 72–98	6–14 (0–7)	16 – Poom	5 – Jackson	5 – Tied	Findlay Toyota Court (653); Flagstaff, AZ
January 24, 2026; 6:00 pm, ESPN+		Northern Colorado	W 81–77	7–14 (1–7)	24 – Komin	5 – Jackson	5 – Jackson	Findlay Toyota Court (905); Flagstaff, AZ
January 29, 2026; 6:00 pm, ESPN+		Eastern Washington	W 92–86	8–14 (2–7)	20 – Abelman	9 – Poom	4 – Tied	Findlay Toyota Court (676); Flagstaff, AZ
January 31, 2026; 6:00 pm, ESPN+		Idaho	L 62–79	8–15 (2–8)	13 – Poom	7 – Abelman	2 – Tied	Findlay Toyota Court (1,221); Flagstaff, AZ
February 5, 2026; 7:00 pm, ESPN+		at Idaho State	W 79–73	9–15 (3–8)	21 – Abelman	7 – Abelman	7 – Peterson	Reed Gym (1,331); Pocatello, ID
February 7, 2026; 7:00 pm, ESPN+		at Weber State	L 53–72	9–16 (3–9)	10 – Shaw	5 – Tied	3 – Abelman	Dee Events Center (2,903); Ogden, UT
February 12, 2026; 6:00 pm, ESPN+		Portland State	L 68–77	9–17 (3–10)	21 – Poom	6 – Poom	6 – Peterson	Findlay Toyota Court (612); Flagstaff, AZ
February 12, 2026; 6:00 pm, ESPN+		Sacramento State	W 79–74	10–17 (4–10)	18 – Summers	7 – Johnson	2 – Tied	Findlay Toyota Court (918); Flagstaff, AZ
February 21, 2026; 6:00 pm, ESPN+		at Northern Colorado	L 77–78	10–18 (4–11)	34 – Komin	6 – Abelman	2 – Tied	Bank of Colorado Arena (1,800); Greeley, CO
February 21, 2026; 6:00 pm, ESPN+		at Idaho	L 58–78	10–19 (4–12)	11 – Tied	5 – Campisano	3 – Abelman	ICCU Arena (1,744); Moscow, ID
February 28, 2026; 2:00 pm, ESPN+		at Eastern Washington	L 57–88	10–20 (4–13)	13 – Shaw	3 – Tied	3 – Tied	Reese Court (2,024); Cheney, WA
March 2, 2026; 6:00 pm, ESPN+		Montana State	L 65–76	10–21 (5–13)	26 – Fort	8 – Tied	6 – Komin	Findlay Toyota Court (711); Flagstaff, AZ
Big Sky tournament
March 7, 2026; 5:30 pm, ESPN+	(10)	vs. (9) Idaho State; First round	L 65–73	10–22	19 – Jackson	8 – Jackson	4 – Tied	Idaho Central Arena; Boise, ID
*Non-conference game. ^{#}Rankings from AP Poll. (#) Tournament seedings in parentheses. All times are in Mountain.
