= Hornet Pavilion =

California State University, Sacramento athletic arena in Sacramento, California

- Location in the United States Location in California
- Interactive map of Hornet Pavilion
- Address: 6000 J Street
- Location: California State University, Sacramento; Sacramento, California, U.S.
- Coordinates: 38°33′23″N 121°25′23″W
- Elevation: 35 ft (10 m) AMSL
- Owner: California State University, Sacramento
- Operator: California State University, Sacramento
- Capacity: 3,000

Construction
- Groundbreaking: October 2024
- Opened: November 3, 2025; 11 months ago
- Cost: $10,000,000
- Architect: LPAS Architecture + Design
- General contractor: Otto Construction

Tenant
- Sacramento State Hornets (NCAA) (2025–present)

Hornet Pavilion is an athletic arena in the western United States, located on the campus of the California State University, Sacramento in Sacramento, California. It is the home of the Sacramento State Hornets of the Big West Conference and serves as the primary venue for men's and women's basketball.

== History ==
The men's basketball program had previously departed the already outdated Hornets Nest once to play off-campus at downtown Sacramento's Memorial Auditorium coinciding with a move to the Big Sky Conference in 1996.

In a 2004 referendum, students approved a student fee increase to fund a new campus recreation and wellness center that would include an arena to host a variety of events such as sporting events and commencement ceremonies. Plans for this recreation center including an 8,000-seat arena at a cost of $72 million were then included in a proposal known as Destination 2010, with the intention of opening these new facilities by that year.

Despite provisions approved in the referendum to allow the student fee to increase with the Consumer Price Index, drastic steel and other construction material price increases - attributed partially to the recovery efforts in New Orleans after Hurricane Katrina as well as high Chinese demand for steel - led the project's cost to balloon. As a result plans for the new recreation center were pared back initially to include a smaller 3,500-seat arena, before ultimately removing the arena from the plan altogether. The new recreation center ultimately opened as "The WELL" as planned in 2010.

Despite this, efforts to construct a new arena continued through the 2010s. In December 2014 a new proposal to increase tuition by $219 a semester in order to raise funds for a new 5,000 seat arena at The WELL was put to a student vote, but was roundly rejected. After this proposal was rejected the University began raising funds in Spring of 2015 for an eventual new on-campus arena through a campaign known as The Power of 1,000 Hornets.

== Construction ==
In late November 2023, The WELL's Board of Directors unanimously voted to approve a resolution that would allow up to $5.2 million in reserve money to fund construction of a new arena at The WELL to replace Hornets Nest, with seating capacity to be determined later. The University chose LPAS Architecture + Design to design the space and Otto Construction as the project's general contractor.

The plan called for the installation of retractable seating surrounding pre-existing recreational courts within The WELL facility known as the "Gym Box" as well as a new PA system, new score and video boards and additional lighting. The new arena was initially planned to be completed and ready in Fall 2024, however only phase 1 was completed by the end of 2024. Construction was completed by late October 2025.

== Opening ==
Hornet Pavilion opened on November 3rd, 2025 with its' first official basketball game at the arena being a 124–39 victory over Stanton University by the Hornets women's team. The men's team played their first official game at the arena the following night, a 103–79 victory over the Dominican Penguins that also marked the debut of head coach Mike Bibby.

== Facilities ==
The arena features telescopic bleachers that seat 3,000 spectators that when not in use are retracted to make additional student recreation space available. The rest of the adjoining student facilities within The WELL remain open to students while the arena is in use. A second-floor running track circles the arena and serves as balcony standing-room seating. Entry to the arena is through the adjacent Hornet Stadium. Restrooms are located on an outdoor concourse. Food truck parking is also located on the outdoor concourse, though small concession stands are available within the arena.

== Future ==
The arena's outdoor restrooms were identified as an early problem - particularly during inclement weather - with plans in place to make additional restrooms available indoors, as well as to add additional premium seating.

Despite the opening of the new facility, the University has stated its long-term goal is to eventually construct a larger on-campus arena separate from The WELL.

== See also ==
- List of NCAA Division I basketball arenas
