= 2026 Big Sky Conference men's basketball tournament =

American college basketball tournament

- Classification: Division I
- Season: 2025–26
- Teams: 10
- Site: Idaho Central Arena; Boise, Idaho
- Champions: Idaho (5th title)
- Winning coach: Alex Pribble (1st title)
- MVP: Money Williams (Montana)
- Television: ESPN+, ESPNU, ESPN2

2025–26 Big Sky men's basketball standings
	Conf.				Overall
Team	W		L	PCT	W		L	PCT
Portland State	13	–	5	.722	20	–	11	.645
Montana State	12	–	6	.667	18	–	14	.563
Eastern Washington	11	–	7	.611	14	–	19	.424
Montana	10	–	8	.556	18	–	16	.529
Northern Colorado	10	–	8	.556	20	–	12	.625
Weber State	10	–	8	.556	16	–	16	.500
Idaho †	9	–	9	.500	21	–	15	.583
Sacramento State	6	–	12	.333	10	–	21	.323
Idaho State	5	–	13	.278	13	–	20	.394
Northern Arizona	4	–	14	.222	10	–	22	.313
† Conference tournament winner

The 2026 Big Sky Conference men's basketball tournament, popularly referred to as "Starch Madness", was the postseason tournament for the Big Sky Conference, held March 7–11, 2026, at Idaho Central Arena in Boise, Idaho. It was the 51st edition of the tournament, which debuted in 1976. The winner, seventh-seeded Idaho, received the Big Sky's automatic bid to the NCAA tournament. It was the Vandals' fifth NCAA appearance, and their first in 36 years.

== Seeds ==
The ten teams were seeded by conference record, with a tiebreaker system for identical conference records. The top six teams received a first-round bye.

Seed	School	Record	Tiebreaker
1	Portland State	13–5	
2	Montana State	12–6	
3	Eastern Washington	11–7	
4	Montana	10–8	2–0 vs. Portland State
5	Northern Colorado	10–8	1–1 vs. Portland State
6	Weber State	10–8	0–2 vs. Portland State
7	Idaho	9–9	
8	Sacramento State	6–12	
9	Idaho State	5–13	
10	Northern Arizona	4–14	

== Schedule ==
Session	Game	Time	Matchup	Score	Television
First round – Saturday, March 7
1	1	5:30 p.m.	No. 9 Idaho State vs. No. 10 Northern Arizona	73–65	ESPN+
1	2	8:00 p.m.	No. 7 Idaho vs. No. 8 Sacramento State	68–45	ESPN+
Quarterfinals – Sunday, March 8
2	3	5:30 p.m.	No. 1 Portland State vs. No. 9 Idaho State	85–78	ESPN+
2	4	8:00 p.m.	No. 2 Montana State vs. No. 7 Idaho	74–78	ESPN+
Quarterfinals – Monday, March 9
3	5	5:30 p.m.	No. 4 Montana vs. No. 5 Northern Colorado	95–89	ESPN+
3	6	8:00 p.m.	No. 3 Eastern Washington vs. No. 6 Weber State	84–79	ESPN+
Semifinals – Tuesday, March 10
4	7	7:00 p.m.	No. 1 Portland State vs. No. 4 Montana	72–75	ESPNU
4	8	9:30 p.m.	No. 3 Eastern Washington vs. No. 7 Idaho	68–81	ESPN2
Championship game – Wednesday, March 11
5	9	9:30 p.m.	No. 4 Montana vs. No. 7 Idaho	66–77	ESPN2
Game times in MT. Rankings denote tournament seeding.

== Bracket ==
First round March 7 ESPN+
9	Idaho State	73
10	Northern Arizona	65
7	Idaho	68
8	Sacramento State	45

Quarterfinals; March 8–9; ESPN+
1	Portland State	85
9	Idaho State	78
4	Montana	95
5	Northern Colorado	89
2	Montana State	74
7	Idaho	78
3	Eastern Washington	84
6	Weber State	79

Semifinals; March 10; ESPNU/ESPN2
1	Portland State	72
4	Montana	75
7	Idaho	81
3	Eastern Washington	68

Championship; March 11; ESPN2
4	Montana	66
7	Idaho	77

== Awards and Honors ==
=== All-Tournament Team ===
Player	Team
**Money Williams**	Montana
Kolton Mitchell	Idaho
Jackson Rasmussen	Idaho
Isaiah Brickner	Idaho
Terri Miller Jr.	Portland State
Alton Hamilton IV	Eastern Washington

MVP in bold
