= 2025–26 Sacramento State Hornets men's basketball team =

American college basketball season

2025–26 Sacramento State Hornets men's basketball
- Conference: Big Sky Conference
- Record: 10–21 (6–12 Big Sky)
- Head coach: Mike Bibby (1st season)
- Associate head coach: Michael Bibby (1st season); Raymond Walcott (1st season)
- Assistant coaches: Jason Fraser (3rd season); Greg Moody II (3rd season); Dr. August Mendes (2nd season)
- Home arena: Hornet Pavilion (Capacity: 3,000)

2025–26 Big Sky men's basketball standings
| | Conf. | | | | Overall |
| Team | W | | L | PCT | W | | L | PCT |
|---|---|---|---|---|---|---|---|---|
| Portland State | 13 | – | 5 | .722 | 20 | – | 11 | .645 |
| Montana State | 12 | – | 6 | .667 | 18 | – | 14 | .563 |
| Eastern Washington | 11 | – | 7 | .611 | 14 | – | 19 | .424 |
| Montana | 10 | – | 8 | .556 | 18 | – | 16 | .529 |
| Northern Colorado | 10 | – | 8 | .556 | 20 | – | 12 | .625 |
| Weber State | 10 | – | 8 | .556 | 16 | – | 16 | .500 |
| Idaho † | 9 | – | 9 | .500 | 21 | – | 15 | .583 |
| Sacramento State | 6 | – | 12 | .333 | 10 | – | 21 | .323 |
| Idaho State | 5 | – | 13 | .278 | 13 | – | 20 | .394 |
| Northern Arizona | 4 | – | 14 | .222 | 10 | – | 22 | .313 |
† Conference tournament winner

The 2025–26 Sacramento State Hornets men's basketball team represented California State University, Sacramento during the 2025–26 NCAA Division I men's basketball season. The Hornets were led by first-year head coach Mike Bibby and played their home games at Hornet Pavilion in Sacramento, California as a member of the Big Sky Conference. This marked Sacramento State's first season playing at Hornet Pavilion, and also marked their final season as members of the Big Sky Conference before transitioning to the Big West Conference on July 1, 2026.

== Previous season ==
The Hornets finished the 2024-25 season 7–25, 3–15 in Big Sky play to finish last in the conference. As the 10-seed in the Big Sky Tournament they were defeated by 7-seed Weber State in the First round 70–83 to end their season.

== Offseason ==
=== Departures ===
| Name | Number | Pos. | Height | Weight | Year | Hometown | Reason for departure |
|---|---|---|---|---|---|---|---|
| Jalen Pitre | 1 | F | 6'8" | 220 | Junior | Long Beach, CA | Transferred to Tennessee State |
| Bailey Nunn | 2 | G | 6'0" | 160 | Sophomore | Melbourne, Australia | Entered transfer portal |
| EJ Neal | 3 | G | 6'5" | 200 | Senior | San Francisco, CA | Transferred to USC |
| Alex Kovatchev | 4 | G | 6'5" | 190 | Sophomore | Perth, Australia | Transferred to Florida |
| Michael Wilson | 5 | G | 6'2" | 195 | Sophomore | Sacramento, CA | Transferred to Dominican (CA) |
| Deonte Williams | 6 | G | 6'6" | 210 | Junior | Sydney, Australia | Entered transfer portal |
| Lachlan Brewer | 7 | G | 6'6" | 190 | Freshman | Launceston, Australia | Transferred to Idaho State |
| Emil Skyttä | 10 | G | 6'4" | 195 | Sophomore | Helsinki, Finland | Transferred to North Dakota State |
| Leo Ricketts | 11 | G | 6'0" | 160 | Freshman | Pleasant Hill, CA | Transferred to West Valley College |
| Kiir Kiir Chol Deng | 14 | F | 6'9" | 215 | Sophomore | Juba, South Sudan | Entered transfer portal |
| Jacob Holt | 15 | F | 6'10" | 250 | Senior | Delta, BC, Canada | Out of eligibility |
| Julian Vaughns | 24 | G | 6'3" | 175 | Junior | Oakland, CA | Entered transfer portal |
| Bowyn Beatty | 25 | F | 7'0" | 225 | Sophomore | Canberra, Australia | Transferred to La Salle |
| Chudi Dioramma | 34 | F | 6'10" | 245 | Freshman | London, England | Transferred to Arkansas State |

=== Incoming transfers ===
| Name | Number | Pos. | Height | Weight | Year | Hometown | Previous college |
|---|---|---|---|---|---|---|---|
| Brandon Gardner | 0 | F | 6'8" | 215 | Sophomore | Waynesboro, GA | USC |
| Mikey Williams | 1 | G | 6'3" | 193 | Sophomore | San Diego, CA | UCF |
| Taj Glover | 2 | G | 6'3" | 190 | Freshman | Atlanta, GA | South Florida |
| Jahni Summers | 4 | G | 6'6" | 195 | Junior | Evansville, IN | Indiana State |
| Jayden Teat | 5 | G | 6'2" | 180 | Sophomore | Sacramento, CA | Utah |
| Zach Anderson | 7 | G | 6'6" | 185 | Junior | Scottsdale, AZ | Scottsdale CC |
| Shaqir O'Neal | 8 | F | 6'8" | 200 | Senior | Los Angeles, CA | Florida A&M |
| Jeremiah Cherry | 9 | F | 6'11" | 250 | Senior | San Diego, CA | UNLV |
| Isaiah Bronson | 13 | G | 6'2" | 180 | Freshman | Gilbert, AZ | Cal Poly Pomona |
| Prophet Johnson | 16 | G | 6'3" | 195 | Senior | Dayton, OH | Fairfield |
| Arman Madi | 23 | G | 6'6" | 205 | Sophomore | Scottsdale, AZ | Northern Arizona |
| Jeremiah Nyarko | 34 | F | 6'9" | 215 | Senior | Accra, Ghana | Stony Brook |

=== 2025 recruiting class ===
College recruiting
| Name | Hometown | School | Height | Weight | Commit date |
|---|---|---|---|---|---|
| Mark Lavrenov; PF | Rocklin, CA | Rocklin HS | 6 ft 8 in (2.03 m) | 220 lb (100 kg) | Nov 15, 2024 |
| Mark Lavrenov; PF | Recruit ratings: No ratings found | | | | |
| Romari Robinson; SG | Miami, FL | Miami Senior HS | 6 ft 4 in (1.93 m) | 195 lb (88 kg) | Apr 30, 2025 |
| Romari Robinson; SG | Recruit ratings: 247Sports: | | | | |
Overall recruit ranking: Scout: – Rivals: –
Note: In many cases, Scout, Rivals, 247Sports, On3, and ESPN may conflict in their listings of height and weight.; In these cases, the average was taken. ESPN grades are on a 100-point scale.; Sources: "2025 Sacramento State Basketball Recruiting Commits". Scout.; "Scout.com Team Recruiting Rankings". Scout.; "2025 Team Ranking". Rivals.

== Roster ==
2025–26 Sacramento State Hornets men's basketball team
Players
Coaches

| Pos. | # | Name | Height | Weight | Year | Previous school | Hometown |
|---|---|---|---|---|---|---|---|
| F | 0 | Brandon Gardner | 6 ft 8 in (2.03 m) | 215 lb (98 kg) | So | USC | Waynesboro, Georgia |
| G | 1 | Mikey Williams | 6 ft 3 in (1.91 m) | 193 lb (88 kg) | So | UCF | San Diego, California |
| G | 2 | Taj Glover | 6 ft 3 in (1.91 m) | 190 lb (86 kg) | Fr | South Florida | Atlanta, Georgia |
| G | 3 | Romari Robinson | 6 ft 4 in (1.93 m) | 195 lb (88 kg) | Fr | Miami HS | Miami, Florida |
| G | 4 | Jahni Summers | 6 ft 6 in (1.98 m) | 195 lb (88 kg) | Jr | Indiana State | Evansville, Indiana |
| G | 5 | Jayden Teat | 6 ft 2 in (1.88 m) | 180 lb (82 kg) | So | Utah | Sacramento, California |
| G | 7 | Zach Anderson | 6 ft 6 in (1.98 m) | 185 lb (84 kg) | Jr | Scottsdale CC | Scottsdale, Arizona |
| F | 8 | Shaqir O'Neal | 6 ft 8 in (2.03 m) | 200 lb (91 kg) | Sr | Florida A&M | Los Angeles, California |
| F | 9 | Jeremiah Cherry | 6 ft 11 in (2.11 m) | 250 lb (113 kg) | Sr | UNLV | San Diego, California |
| G | 13 | Isaiah Bronson | 6 ft 2 in (1.88 m) | 180 lb (82 kg) | Fr | Cal Poly Pomona | Gilbert, Arizona |
| G | 16 | Prophet Johnson | 6 ft 3 in (1.91 m) | 195 lb (88 kg) | Sr | Fairfield | Dayton, Ohio |
| G | 23 | Arman Madi | 6 ft 6 in (1.98 m) | 205 lb (93 kg) | So | Northern Arizona | Scottsdale, Arizona |
| F | 32 | Mark Lavrenov | 6 ft 8 in (2.03 m) | 220 lb (100 kg) | Fr | Rocklin HS | Rocklin, California |
| F | 34 | Jeremiah Nyarko | 6 ft 9 in (2.06 m) | 215 lb (98 kg) | Sr | Stony Brook | Accra, Ghana |

Head coach

- Mike Bibby (Arizona)

Assistant coach(es)

- Michael Bibby (Appalachian State)
- Raymond Walcott
- Jason Fraser (Villanova)
- Greg Moody II (Mount Olive)
- Dr. August Mendes (Arizona)

Legend

- (C) Team captain
- (S) Suspended
- (I) Ineligible
- (W) Walk-on
- Injured
- Current redshirt

Roster
Last update: 2025-11-01

== Schedule and results ==
| Date time, TV | Rank^{#} | Opponent^{#} | Result | Record | High points | High rebounds | High assists | Site (attendance) city, state |
Non-conference regular season
| November 4, 2025*; 7:00 p.m., ESPN+ | | Dominican (CA) | W 103–79 | 1–0 | 21 – Tied | 10 – Cherry | 6 – Williams | Hornet Pavilion (2,312); Sacramento, CA |
| November 7, 2025*; 7:00 p.m., ESPN+ | | Jessup | W 86–76 | 2–0 | 19 – Teat | 12 – Cherry | 8 – Williams | Hornet Pavilion (2,312); Sacramento, CA |
| November 11, 2025*; 7:00 p.m., ESPN+ | | UC Santa Barbara | L 87–92 | 2–1 | 30 – Williams | 11 – Johnson | 6 – Johnson | Hornet Pavilion (2,734); Sacramento, CA |
| November 14, 2025*; 7:00 p.m., ESPN+ | | at UC Davis; Causeway Classic | L 73–77 | 2–2 | 22 – Cherry | 12 – Johnson | 4 – Williams | University Credit Union Center (3,786); Davis, CA |
| November 16, 2025*; 1:00 p.m., ESPN+ | | Presbyterian; Empire Classic campus game | W 64–62 | 3–2 | 17 – Cherry | 10 – Cherry | 5 – Williams | Hornet Pavilion (2,216); Sacramento, CA |
| November 18, 2025*; 7:30 p.m., BTN | | at No. 19 UCLA; Empire Classic campus game | L 48–79 | 3–3 | 13 – Johnson | 10 – Tied | 4 – Johnson | Pauley Pavilion (4,735); Los Angeles, CA |
| November 21, 2025*; 6:00 p.m., ACCNX | | at California; Empire Classic campus game | L 67–91 | 3–4 | 19 – Gardner | 11 – Johnson | 5 – Williams | Haas Pavilion (4,295); Berkeley, CA |
| November 25, 2025*; 7:00 p.m., ESPN+ | | San Francisco State | W 94–46 | 4–4 | 11 – Pernell | 7 – Chatha | 2 – 4 tied | Hornet Pavilion (2,749); Sacramento, CA |
| November 29, 2025*; 7:00 p.m., ESPN+ | | at Pacific | L 54–68 | 4–5 | 14 – Williams | 9 – Lavrenov | 6 – Williams | Alex G. Spanos Center (2,311); Stockton, CA |
| December 2, 2025*; 7:00 p.m., ESPN+ | | at Baylor | L 88–110 | 4–6 | 21 – Tied | 9 – Lavrenov | 4 – Johnson | Foster Pavilion (7,082); Waco, TX |
| December 20, 2025*; 5:00 p.m., ESPN+ | | at California Baptist | L 67–74 | 4–7 | 21 – Summers | 9 – Tied | 5 – Williams | Fowler Events Center (3,601); Riverside, CA |
| December 22, 2025*; 7:00 p.m., ESPN+ | | at Cal State Northridge | L 88–100 | 4–8 | 26 – Johnson | 11 – Johnson | 9 – Williams | Premier America Credit Union Arena (1,080); Northridge, CA |
Big Sky regular season
| January 1, 2026; 6:00 p.m., ESPN+ | | at Idaho State | L 84-97 | 4–9 (0–1) | 34 – Williams | 9 – Tied | 2 – Tied | Reed Gym (1,701); Pocatello, ID |
| January 3, 2026; 6:00 p.m., ESPN+ | | at Weber State | L 82–95 | 4–10 (0–2) | 26 – Williams | 8 – O'Neal | 5 – Johnson | Dee Events Center (2,716); Ogden, UT |
| January 10, 2026; 7:00 p.m., ESPN+ | | at Portland State | L 69–96 | 4–11 (0–3) | 29 – Williams | 11 – Lavrenov | 3 – Glover | Viking Pavilion (1,304); Portland, OR |
| January 15, 2026; 7:00 p.m., ESPN+ | | Northern Arizona | W 83–69 | 5–11 (1–3) | 29 – Johnson | 10 – Lavrenov | 7 – Glover | Hornet Pavilion (2,298); Sacramento, CA |
| January 17, 2026; 7:00 p.m., ESPN+ | | Northern Colorado | W 93–89 | 6–11 (2–3) | 30 – Johnson | 17 – Lavrenov | 4 – Summers | Hornet Pavilion (2,596); Sacramento, CA |
| January 22, 2026; 6:00 p.m., ESPN+ | | at Idaho | L 76–86 | 6–12 (2–4) | 26 – Lavrenov | 12 – Lavrenov | 9 – Johnson | ICCU Arena (2,445); Moscow, ID |
| January 24, 2026; 2:00 p.m., ESPN+ | | at Eastern Washington | L 67–75 | 6–13 (2–5) | 26 – Lavrenov | 11 – Johnson | 5 – Williams | Reese Court (1,832); Cheney, WA |
| January 29, 2026; 7:00 p.m., ESPN+ | | Montana State | W 83–80 | 7–13 (3–5) | 27 – Johnson | 12 – Lavrenov | 5 – Johnson | Hornet Pavilion (2,826); Sacramento, CA |
| January 31, 2026; 7:00 p.m., ESPN+ | | Montana | W 86–79 | 8–13 (4–5) | 26 – Johnson | 7 – Johnson | 8 – Summers | Hornet Pavilion (3,116); Sacramento, CA |
| February 2, 2026; 7:00 p.m., ESPN+ | | Weber State | W 104–90 | 9–13 (5–5) | 35 – Johnson | 9 – Lavrenov | 5 – Summers | Hornet Pavilion (2,819); Sacramento, CA |
| February 7, 2026; 7:00 p.m., ESPN+ | | Portland State | L 73–74 | 9–14 (5–6) | 28 – Johnson | 8 – O'Neal | 4 – Madi | Hornet Pavilion (3,016); Sacramento, CA |
| February 12, 2026; 5:00 p.m., ESPN+ | | at Northern Colorado | L 79–95 | 9–15 (5–7) | 23 – Johnson | 7 – Lavrenov | 3 – Johnson | Bank of Colorado Arena (1,704); Greeley, CO |
| February 14, 2026; 5:00 p.m., ESPN+ | | at Northern Arizona | L 74–79 | 9–16 (5–8) | 18 – Summers | 7 – Johnson | 2 – Tied | Findlay Toyota Court (918); Flagstaff, AZ |
| February 19, 2026; 7:00 p.m., ESPN+ | | Eastern Washington | L 94–102 | 9–17 (5–9) | 20 – Johnson | 9 – Johnson | 8 – Johnson | Hornet Pavilion (2,691); Sacramento, CA |
| February 21, 2026; 7:00 p.m., ESPN+ | | Idaho | L 80–86 | 9–18 (5–10) | 20 – Lavrenov | 12 – Lavrenov | 6 – Johnson | Hornet Pavilion (2,895); Sacramento, CA |
| February 26, 2026; 6:00 p.m., ESPN+ | | at Montana | L 73–81 | 9–19 (5–11) | 14 – Johnson | 12 – Lavrenov | 6 – Johnson | Dahlberg Arena (3,174); Missoula, MT |
| February 28, 2026; 12:00 p.m., ESPN+ | | at Montana State | L 61–82 | 9–20 (5–12) | 15 – Tied | 7 – Lavrenov | 3 – Teat | Worthington Arena (3,503); Bozeman, MT |
| March 2, 2026; 7:00 p.m., ESPN+ | | Idaho State | W 83–65 | 10–20 (6–12) | 20 – Johnson | 11 – Madi | 7 – Madi | Hornet Pavilion (3,016); Sacramento, CA |
Big Sky tournament
| March 7, 2026; 7:00 pm, ESPN+ | (8) | vs. (7) Idaho; First round | L 45–68 | 10–21 | 10 – Summers | 6 – Tied | 2 – Tied | Idaho Central Arena; Boise, ID |
*Non-conference game. ^{#}Rankings from AP Poll. (#) Tournament seedings in parentheses. All times are in Pacific Time.
