= 2026–27 Big West Conference men's basketball season =

- League: NCAA Division I
- Sport: Basketball
- Teams: 12
- TV partner(s): ESPN+, ESPNU, ESPN2

2026–27 NCAA Division I men's basketball season

Big West tournament
- Venue: Lee's Family Forum, Henderson, Nevada

Big West Conference men's basketball seasons
- ← 2025–26 2027–28 →

2026–27 Big West men's basketball standings
	Conf.				Overall
Team	W		L	PCT	W		L	PCT
Cal State Bakersfield	0	–	0	–	4	–	0	1.000
UC Santa Barbara	0	–	0	–	4	–	0	1.000
UC Irvine	0	–	0	–	3	–	0	1.000
Utah Valley	0	–	0	–	3	–	0	1.000
UC Riverside	0	–	0	–	3	–	1	.750
Cal State Fullerton	0	–	0	–	2	–	1	.667
UC San Diego	0	–	0	–	2	–	1	.667
Cal Poly	0	–	0	–	2	–	3	.400
Cal State Northridge	0	–	0	–	1	–	2	.333
Long Beach State	0	–	0	–	1	–	2	.333
Sacramento State	0	–	0	–	1	–	2	.333
California Baptist	0	–	0	–	1	–	3	.250
† 2027 Big West tournament winner As of November 16, 2026; Rankings from AP poll

The 2026–27 Big West Conference men's basketball season is for the Big West Conference in the 2026–27 NCAA Division I men's basketball season. The basketball teams begin with practices in October followed by the start of season in November 2026. Conference play begins in December 2025, and ends in March, after which the top 8 member teams participate in the 2027 Big West Conference men's basketball tournament at Lee's Family Forum in Henderson, Nevada. The tournament champion will receive the conference's automatic bid to the 2027 NCAA tournament.

The 2026–27 Big West Conference will compete as a 12-team league. Effective July 1, 2026, Hawaiʻi and UC Davis officially departed the conference to join the Mountain West Conference. To offset these departures, the Big West welcomed three new members: California Baptist and Utah Valley University from the Western Athletic Conference (WAC; now known as the United Athletic Conference), as well as Sacramento State from the Big Sky Conference. This season is also the final year in the conference for UC San Diego and UC Santa Barbara, both of which accepted invitations to join the West Coast Conference (WCC) beginning in July 2027.

== Head coaches ==
=== Coaches ===
Team	Head coach	Previous job	Years at school	Overall record	Big West record	Big West titles	Big West tournament titles
Cal State Fullerton	Dedrique Taylor	Arizona State (Associate)	14	179–221 (.448)	94–115 (.450)	0	2
California Baptist	Kyle Getter	Notre Dame (Associate)	1	0–0 (–)	0–0 (–)	0	0
Cal Poly	Mike DeGeorge	Colorado Mesa	3	30–38 (.441)	18–22 (.450)	0	0
Cal State Bakersfield	Todd Lee	USC (Assistant)	1	0–0 (–)	0–0 (–)	0	0
Cal State Northridge	Andy Newman	CS San Bernardino	4	61–40 (.604)	35–25 (.583)	0	0
Long Beach State	Chris Acker	San Diego State(Assistant)	3	17–47 (.266)	9–31 (.225)	0	0
Sacramento State	Mike Bibby	Hillcrest Prep Academy	2	10–21 (.323)	6–12 (.333)	0	0
UC Irvine	Russell Turner	Golden State Warriors(Assistant)	17	344–199 (.634)	187–75 (.714)	7	2
UC Riverside	Gus Argenal	CS San Bernardino	2	10–22 (.313)	5–15 (.250)	0	0
UC San Diego	Clint Allard	UC San Diego(Associate)	2	23–11 (.676)	12–8 (.600)	0	0
UC Santa Barbara	Joe Pasternack	Arizona (Assoc.)	10	187–95 (.663)	95–59 (.617)	2	2
Utah Valley	Todd Phillips	Utah Valley (Associate)	4	66–34 (.660)	0–0 (–)	0	0

Notes:

- All records, appearances, titles, etc. are from time with current school only.
- Year at school includes 2026–27 season.
- Overall and Big West records are from time at current school only and are through the beginning of the season.

== Preseason ==
The Big West basketball season previews were held on October 1, 2026.

=== Preseason Big West Field of 68 rankings ===
	Team
1.	UC Santa Barbara
2.	Utah Valley
3.	UC Irvine
4.	UC San Diego
5.	CSUN
6.	Cal Poly
7.	Sacramento State
8.	California Baptist
9.	Cal State Bakersfield
10.	Cal State Fullerton
11.	UC Riverside
12.	Long Beach State

=== Big West preseason Field of 68 awards ===
School	Recipient	Award
CSUN	Andy Newman	Coach of the year
UC Santa Barbara	CJ Shaw	Player of the year
Utah Valley	Isaac Hawkins	Defensive player of the year
UC San Diego	Treysen Eaglestaff	Transfer of the year
Cal State Fullerton	Christian Williams	Breakout Player of the year

=== Big West Conference Preseason Coaches' Poll ===
The Big West Conference released its preseason coaches' poll on October 15, 2026.

Big West Preseason Poll
Place	Team	Points
1	UC Irvine	114 (7)
2	UC San Diego	105 (3)
3	UC Santa Barbara	103 (2)
4	Cal State Northridge	86
5	Utah Valley	85
6	Cal Poly	65
7	Sacramento State	58
8	Cal State Fullerton	49
9	California Baptist	40
10	Cal State Bakersfield	28
11	UC Riverside	23
12	Long Beach State	19
(#) first-place votes

=== Big West Preseason All-Big West Team ===
Player	School
Leo Beath	UC San Diego
Josiah Davis	Cal State Northridge
Larry Hughes II	Sacramento State
Miro Little	UC Santa Barbara
Hamad Mousa	Cal Poly
CJ Shaw	UC Santa Barbara

== Regular season ==
=== Players of the Week ===
Throughout the conference regular season, the Big West will name one player of the week each Monday.

Date	Player of the Week	School
November 9	Jaden Alexander	Cal State Bakersfield

=== Early season tournaments ===
Team	Tournament	Finish
Cal State Fullerton	N/A	
California Baptist	Acrisure Series	
Cal Poly	N/A	
Cal State Bakersfield	N/A	
Cal State Northridge	N/A	
Long Beach State	FIU Tournament	
Sacramento State	N/A	
UC Irvine	Acrisure Series	
UC Riverside	N/A	
UC San Diego	Acrisure Series	
UC Santa Barbara	Gratitude Thanksgiving Classic	
Utah Valley	Paradise Jam	

=== Records against other conferences ===
2026-27 records against non-conference opponents. Does not include exhibition matchups but includes postseason matchups.

Power Conferences & Gonzaga	Record
ACC	0–0
Big East	0–0
Big Ten	0–0
Big 12	0–0
SEC	0–0
Gonzaga	0–0
Power Conferences Total	0–0
Other NCAA Division I Conferences	Record
America East	0–0
American	0–0
A-10	0–0
ASUN	0–0
Big Sky	0–0
Big South	0–0
CAA	0–0
CUSA	0–0
Horizon League	0–0
Ivy League	0–0
MAC	0–0
MEAC	0–0
Metro	0–0
MVC	0–0
Mountain West	0–0
NEC	0–0
OVC	0–0
Pac-12 (except Gonzaga)	0–0
Patriot League	0–0
SoCon	0–0
Southland	0–0
SWAC	0–0
Summit	0–0
Sun Belt	0–0
UAC	0–0
WCC	0–0
Other Division I Total	0–0
NCAA Division I Total	0–0
NCAA Non Division I Total	0–0
Grand Total	0–0

== Postseason ==
=== Big West tournament ===
- The 2027 Big West Conference Basketball Tournament will be held at the Lee's Family Forum in Henderson, Nevada, in March 2027.

=== NCAA tournament ===
Seed	Region	School	First Four	First round	Second round	Sweet 16	Elite Eight	Final Four	Championship
		W–L (%):	0–0 (–)	0–0 (–)	0–0 (–)	0–0 (–)	0–0 (–)	0–0 (–)	0–0 (–)
Total: 0–0 (–)

=== National Invitation tournament ===
Seed	Bracket	School	1st round	2nd round	Quarterfinals	Semifinals	Championship
		W–L (%):	0–0 (–)	0–0 (–)	0–0 (–)	0–0 (–)	0–0 (–)
Total: 0–0 (–)

== Awards and honors ==
=== All-Big West Teams and Awards ===
==== Individual Awards ====
Honor	Recipient	School
Coach of the Year		
Player of the Year		
Newcomer of the Year		
Freshman of the Year		
Best Defensive Player		
Best Hustle Player		
Best Sixth Player		

==== All-Big West First Team ====
Player	Pos.	Yr.	Ht., Wt.	Hometown	School

==== All-Big West Second Team ====
Player	Pos.	Yr.	Ht., Wt.	Hometown	School

==== Honorable Mention ====
Player	Pos.	Yr.	Ht., Wt.	Hometown	School

== Home game attendance ==
Team	Arena	Capacity	Game 1	Game 2	Game 3	Game 4	Game 5	Game 6	Game 7	Game 8	Game 9	Game 10	Game 11	Game 12	Game 13	Game 14	Game 15	Game 16	Total	Average	% of Capacity
Cal State Fullerton	Titan Gym	4,000																			
California Baptist	Fowler Events Center	5,050																			
Cal Poly	Mott Athletics Center	3,032																			
Cal State Bakersfield	Icardo Center	3,497	603																		
Cal State Northridge	Premier America Credit Union Arena	2,500																			
Long Beach State	Walter Pyramid	4,000																			
Sacramento State	Hornet Pavilion	3,000	2,324																		
UC Irvine	Bren Events Center	5,000	1,826																		
UC Riverside	SRC Arena	3,168																			
UC San Diego	LionTree Arena	4,000	2,183	3,669																	
UC Santa Barbara	The Thunderdome	5,000																			
Utah Valley	UCCU Center	8,500	1,607																		
Total		50,747																			

Bold – At or exceed capacity; attendance is for regular season only

- †Season high

== See also ==
- 2026–27 Big West Conference women's basketball season
