= 2026–27 UC Irvine Anteaters men's basketball team =

American college basketball season

2026–27 UC Irvine Anteaters men's basketball
- Conference: Big West Conference
- Record: 3–1 (0–0 Big West)
- Head coach: Russell Turner (17th season)
- Assistant coaches: Ali Ton (4th season); Patrick Scully (3rd season); Julius Smith (3rd season); Nick Booker (2nd season); Brady Boznanski (2nd season)
- Home arena: Bren Events Center (Capacity: 5,000)

2026–27 Big West men's basketball standings
	Conf.				Overall
Team	W		L	PCT	W		L	PCT
Cal State Bakersfield	0	–	0	–	4	–	0	1.000
UC Santa Barbara	0	–	0	–	4	–	0	1.000
Utah Valley	0	–	0	–	3	–	0	1.000
UC Irvine	0	–	0	–	3	–	1	.750
UC San Diego	0	–	0	–	3	–	1	.750
UC Riverside	0	–	0	–	3	–	2	.600
Cal State Fullerton	0	–	0	–	2	–	2	.500
Cal Poly	0	–	0	–	2	–	3	.400
Sacramento State	0	–	0	–	1	–	2	.333
Cal State Northridge	0	–	0	–	1	–	3	.250
Long Beach State	0	–	0	–	1	–	3	.250
California Baptist	0	–	0	–	1	–	4	.200
† 2027 Big West tournament winner As of November 19, 2026; Rankings from AP poll

The 2026–27 UC Irvine Anteaters men's basketball team represents the University of California, Irvine in the 2026–27 NCAA Division I men's basketball season. They play home games at the Bren Events Center in Irvine, California as a member of the Big West Conference. The Anteaters are led by 17th-year head coach Russell Turner. The Anteaters were invited to compete in the William Jones Cup during the offseason. In it, they went 7–1, falling in the championship game 78–98 to Wonju DB New Generation South Korea. They finished as runner-up.

== Previous season ==
The 2025–26 UC Irvine Anteaters went 23–12 overall, and 15–5 in Big West play. They received the one seed in the Big West tournament. After losing to Hawai'i in the championship game, the Anteaters were not chosen for the NCAA tournament. As the Anteaters won the Big West regular season, they were offered an automatic bid and four seed in the NIT. This was the fourth year in a row the Anteaters participated in the NIT, and second year in a row with the opportunity to host at least one game. Their season ended with their loss to UNLV in the first round. With the loss, the squad officially failed to improve upon the prior year's record.

== Offseason ==
=== Preseason Polls ===
The Big West Coaches' Poll was released October 15, 2026. UC Irvine was predicted to finish first. This is the third consecutive year UC Irvine was predicted to finish as the winner. No UC Irvine player was chosen for the preseason coaches' team.

Coaches' Poll
Pos.	Team	Points
1	UC Irvine	114 (7)
2	UC San Diego	105 (3)
3	UC Santa Barbara	103 (2)
4	Cal State Northridge	86
5	Utah Valley	85
6	Cal Poly	75
7	Sacramento State	65
8	Cal State Fullerton	49
9	California Baptist	40
10	Cal State Bakersfield	28
11	UC Riverside	23
12	Long Beach State	19

=== Departures ===
Six players from the 2025–26 roster departed Irvine, including one graduate and four transfers. Andre Henry graduated. Derin Saran transferred to Richmond, Kyle Evans transferred to NC State, Jurian Dixon transferred to Virginia, and Akiva McBirney-Griffin transferred to Northern Illinois. Meanwhile, Tishan Ahir, a walk-on for two years, was cut due to a lack of roster space.

Departures
Name	Number	Pos.	Height	Weight	Year	Hometown	Reason for departure
Andre Henry	4	G	6'4"	190	Graduate	La Cañada Flintridge, CA	Graduated
Derin Saran	13	G	6'5"	190	Redshirt Sophomore	Istanbul, Turkey	Transferred to Richmond
Kyle Evans	14	F	6'10"	210	Redshirt Senior	Aliso Viejo, CA	Transferred to NC State
Jurian Dixon	24	G	6'4"	195	Redshirt Sophomore	San Diego, CA	Transferred to Virginia
Tishan Ahir	27	G	6'0"	150	Sophomore	La Cañada Flintridge, CA	Cut
Akiva McBirney-Griffin	43	F	6'9"	225	Redshirt Junior	Hamilton, NZ	Transferred to Northern Illinois

=== Incoming transfers ===
On April 30, 2026, UC Irvine announced the addition of the tallest player in college basketball history, Olivier Rioux, to the roster. The center from Terrebonne, Quebec transferred to UC Irvine after two seasons with Florida. On May 19, 2026, Irvine announced the addition of Nils Cooper to the roster, a guard from Santa Monica, California, transferring after previous seasons with Pepperdine and UC Davis.

Incoming transfers
Name	Number	Pos.	Height	Weight	Year	Hometown	Previous School
Nils Cooper	16	G	6'6"	185	Senior	Santa Monica, CA	UC Davis
Olivier Rioux	22	C	7'9"	305	Junior (Note: Listed as a junior by UC Irvine, but a sophomore in athletic eligibility, having redshirted his first season at Florida.)	Terrebonne, QC	Florida

=== Recruits ===
College recruiting
Name	Hometown	School	Height	Weight	Commit date
Josiah Johnson; G	Long Beach, CA	Mayfair High School	6 ft 5 in (1.96 m)	195 lb (88 kg)	May 21, 2026
Josiah Johnson; G	Recruit ratings: Rivals: 247Sports: ESPN:				
Parker Spees; F	Fresno, CA	San Joaquin Memorial High School	6 ft 9 in (2.06 m)	200 lb (91 kg)	Nov 13, 2025
Parker Spees; F	Recruit ratings: No ratings found				
Dom Bentho; F	Playa del Rey, CA	Harvard-Westlake High School	6 ft 9 in (2.06 m)	240 lb (110 kg)	Dec 16, 2025
Dom Bentho; F	Recruit ratings: No ratings found				
Overall recruit ranking:
Note: In many cases, Scout, Rivals, 247Sports, On3, and ESPN may conflict in their listings of height and weight.; In these cases, the average was taken. ESPN grades are on a 100-point scale.; Sources:

== Roster ==
2025–26 UC Irvine Anteaters men's basketball team
Players
Coaches

Pos.	#	Name	Height	Weight	Year	Previous school	Hometown
G	0	Bryce Goldman	6 ft 6 in (1.98 m)	200 lb (91 kg)	So	Chaminade College Prep	Tarzana, California
G	1	Torian Lee	6 ft 0 in (1.83 m)	165 lb (75 kg)	Jr	Orangeville Prep	Surrey, British Columbia, Canada
F	2	Harrison Carrington	6 ft 7 in (2.01 m)	215 lb (98 kg)	RS Sr	Colorado	Menlo Park, California
F/C	3	Elijah Chol	7 ft 0 in (2.13 m)	190 lb (86 kg)	RS Sr	Forsyth Central High School	Cumming, Georgia
G	5	Ben Egbo	6 ft 4 in (1.93 m)	205 lb (93 kg)	RS Sr	Perry High School	Gilbert, Arizona
G	6	Tamatoa Isaac	6 ft 2 in (1.88 m)	207 lb (94 kg)	Fr	Christ's College High School	Christchurch, New Zealand
G	7	Josh Palmer	6 ft 4 in (1.93 m)	160 lb (73 kg)	Fr	St. Bernard High School	Carson, California
G	8	Luke Isaak	6 ft 3 in (1.91 m)	190 lb (86 kg)	Fr	San Ramon High School	Alamo, California
G	9	Jovan Jester Jr.	6 ft 4 in (1.93 m)	195 lb (88 kg)	RS Fr	Pasadena High School	Pasadena, California
G	10	Josiah Johnson	6 ft 5 in (1.96 m)	195 lb (88 kg)	Fr	Mayfair High School	Long Beach, California
F	11	Parker Spees	6 ft 9 in (2.06 m)	200 lb (91 kg)	Fr	San Joaquin Memorial High School	Fresno, California
F	14	Dom Bentho (W)	6 ft 9 in (2.06 m)	240 lb (109 kg)	Fr	Harvard-Westlake High School	Playa del Rey, California
G	16	Nils Cooper	6 ft 6 in (1.98 m)	185 lb (84 kg)	Sr	UC Davis	Santa Monica, California
G	21	Langston Redfield (W)	6 ft 4 in (1.93 m)	205 lb (93 kg)	RS Sr	Capistrano Valley High School	Mission Viejo, California
C	22	Olivier Rioux	7 ft 9 in (2.36 m)	305 lb (138 kg)	Jr	Florida	Terrebonne, Quebec, Canada
F	23	Nes Emeneke	6 ft 10 in (2.08 m)	225 lb (102 kg)	So	Archbishop Riordan High School	Yaoundé, Cameroon
F	55	Mason Hodges	6 ft 7 in (2.01 m)	215 lb (98 kg)	Fr	San Juan Hills High School	San Juan Capistrano, California

Head coach

- Russell Turner (Hampden–Sydney)

Assistant coach(es)

- Ali Ton (Davidson)
- Patrick Scully (Oregon)
- Julius Smith (Jessup)
- Nick Booker (Davidson)
- Brady Boznanski (Gonzaga)

Legend

- (C) Team captain
- (S) Suspended
- (I) Ineligible
- (W) Walk-on
- Injured
- Current redshirt

Roster

== Schedule and results ==
Date time, TV	Rank^{#}	Opponent^{#}	Result	Record	High points	High rebounds	High assists	Site (attendance) city, state
2026 William Jones Cup
August 14, 2026; 2:00 am, PTS+		at Chinese Taipei White	W 88–67	—	20 – Isaak	13 – Carrington	9 – Isaac	Xinzhuang Gymnasium; New Taipei City, Taiwan
August 14, 2026; 10:00 pm, PTS+		vs. Jordan	W 84–66	—	17 – Jester Jr.	5 – Tied	8 – Isaac	Xinzhuang Gymnasium; New Taipei City, Taiwan
August 15, 2026; 10:00 pm, PTS+		vs. Malaysia	W 87–55	—	15 – Johnson	10 – Egbo	6 – Johnson	Xinzhuang Gymnasium; New Taipei City, Taiwan
August 18, 2026; 2:00 am, PTS+		at Chinese Taipei White	W 81–57	—	19 – Johnson	9 – Rioux	4 – Lee	Xinzhuang Gymnasium; New Taipei City, Taiwan
August 18, 2026; 10:00 pm, PTS+		vs. Malaysia	W 81–62	—	16 – Palmer	7 – Tied	10 – Johnson	Xinzhuang Gymnasium; New Taipei City, Taiwan
August 19, 2026; 10:00 pm, PTS+		vs. Jordan	W 80–49	—	13 – Johnson	9 – Bentho	6 – Isaac	Xinzhuang Gymnasium; New Taipei City, Taiwan
August 22, 2026; 2:00 am, PTS+		at Chinese Taipei Blue; Semifinals	W 96–71	—	21 – Isaac	14 – Emeneke	7 – Isaac	Xinzhuang Gymnasium; New Taipei City, Taiwan
August 23, 2026; 4:00 am, PTS+		vs. Wonju DB New Generation South Korea; Championship	L 78–98	—	18 – Jester Jr.	12 – Emeneke	3 – Tied	Xinzhuang Gymnasium; New Taipei City, Taiwan
Exhibition
October 10, 2026*; 2:00 pm, GSMedia.ca		at University of Quebec in Montreal	W 101–70	—	13 – Johnson	11 – Rioux	8 – Isaac	Champlain Gym; Montreal, Canada
October 27, 2026*; 7:00 pm, ESPN+		Cal State LA	W 94—58	—	17 – Jester Jr.	8 – Rioux	7 – Isaac	Bren Events Center (1,482); Irvine, CA
Regular season
November 3, 2026*; 7:00 pm, ESPN+		Chapman	W 92–66	1–0	16 – Isaak	12 – Rioux	5 – Isaac	Bren Events Center (1,826); Irvine, CA
November 7, 2026*; 7:00 pm, ESPN+		San Jose State	W 91–79	2–0	24 – Jester	9 – Emeneke	8 – Isaac	Bren Events Center (2,312); Irvine, CA
November 11, 2026*; 7:00 pm, ESPN+		Lincoln	W 90–40	3–0	14 – Jester Jr.	13 – Rioux	2 – Tied	Bren Events Center (2,258); Irvine, CA
November 17, 2026*; 7:00 pm, ACCNX		at Stanford; Acrisure Series Campus Game	L 61–65	3–1	14 – Jester Jr.	8 – Rioux	2 – Tied	Maples Pavilion (2,125); Stanford, CA
November 21, 2026*; 1:30 pm, FloHoops		vs. San Diego; Acrisure Series Pod 5						Acrisure Arena; Palm Desert, CA
November 22, 2026*; 1:30 pm, FloHoops		vs. Loyola Marymount; Acrisure Series Pod 5						Acrisure Arena; Palm Desert, CA
November 28, 2026*; 2:00 pm, ESPN+		at Seattle						Redhawk Center; Seattle, WA
December 3, 2026; 7:00 pm, ESPN+		UC Riverside; Big West Bold Week						Bren Events Center; Irvine, CA
December 5, 2026; 7:00 pm, ESPN+		UC San Diego; Big West Bold Week						Bren Events Center; Irvine, CA
December 11, 2026*; 7:00 pm, ESPN+		Northern Iowa						Bren Events Center; Irvine, CA
December 18, 2026*; 7:00 pm, ESPN+		New Mexico						Bren Events Center; Irvine, CA
December 20, 2026*; 10:00 pm, MW+		at Hawai'i						Stan Sheriff Center; Honolulu, HI
December 29, 2026*; 7:00 pm, ESPN+		Fresno State						Bren Events Center; Irvine, CA
December 31, 2026; 6:00 pm, ESPN+		at Long Beach State; Black and Blue Rivalry						Walter Pyramid; Long Beach, CA
January 2, 2027; 4:00 p.m., ESPN+		at Cal State Fullerton						Titan Gym; Fullerton, CA
January 7, 2027; 7:00 pm, ESPN+		Sacramento State						Bren Events Center; Irvine, CA
January 9, 2027; 7:00 pm, ESPN+/SSN		Utah Valley						Bren Events Center; Irvine, CA
January 14, 2027; 7:00 pm, ESPN+		at Cal Baptist						Fowler Events Center (—); Riverside, CA
January 16, 2027; 9:00 pm, ESPN+		at UC Riverside						SRC Arena; Riverside, CA
January 21, 2027; 7:00 pm, ESPN+/SSN		Cal State Fullerton						Bren Events Center; Irvine, CA
January 23, 2027; 7:00 pm, ESPN+		Long Beach State; Black and Blue Rivalry						Bren Events Center; Irvine, CA
January 28, 2027; 7:00 pm, ESPN+		at Cal Poly						Mott Athletics Center; San Luis Obispo, CA
January 30, 2027; 6:00 pm, ESPN+		at UC Santa Barbara						The Thunderdome; Santa Barbara, CA
February 4, 2027; 7:00 pm, ESPN+		Cal State Bakersfield						Bren Events Center; Irvine, CA
February 6, 2027; 7:00 pm, ESPN+		Cal State Northridge						Bren Events Center; Irvine, CA
February 11, 2027; 5:00 pm, ESPN+		at Utah Valley						UCCU Center; Orem, UT
February 13, 2027; 7:00 pm, ESPN+		at Sacramento State						Hornet Pavilion; Sacramento, CA
February 18, 2027; 7:00 pm, ESPN+		Cal Baptist						Bren Events Center; Irvine, CA
February 20, 2027; 6:00 pm, ESPN+		at UC San Diego						LionTree Arena; La Jolla, CA
February 25, 2027; 7:00 pm, ESPN+		UC Santa Barbara						Bren Events Center; Irvine, CA
February 27, 2027; 7:00 pm, ESPN+		Cal Poly; Homecoming						Bren Events Center; Irvine, CA
March 4, 2027; 8:00 pm, ESPN+/SSN		at Cal State Northridge						Premier America Credit Union Arena; Northridge, CA
March 6, 2027; 2:00 pm, ESPN+		at Cal State Bakersfield						Icardo Center; Bakersfield, CA
Big West tournament
March 10–13, 2027; TBA		vs. TBD						Lee's Family Forum; Henderson, NV
*Non-conference game. ^{#}Rankings from AP Poll. (#) Tournament seedings in parentheses. All times are in Pacific.

== Rankings ==
Ranking movements Legend: — = Not ranked
	Week																				
Poll	Pre	1	2	3	4	5	6	7	8	9	10	11	12	13	14	15	16	17	18	19	Final
AP	—																				
Coaches	—																				

== Awards and honors ==
=== Preseason ===
National Honors
Honors	Coach	Date awarded	Ref.
2026 100 Most Impactful: Men's Mid Major Assistants/GM’s	Nick Booker	October 18, 2026	
2026 100 Most Impactful: Men's Mid Major Assistants/GM’s	Julius Smith	October 18, 2026	

== See Also ==
- 2026–27 UC Irvine Anteaters women's basketball team
