= 2026–27 UC Santa Barbara Gauchos men's basketball team =

American college basketball season

2026–27 UC Santa Barbara Gauchos men's basketball
- Conference: Big West Conference
- Record: 3–0 (0–0 Big West)
- Head coach: Joe Pasternack (10th season)
- Assistant coaches: Brandon Cyrus; Brian Eskildsen; Derek Glasser; Brandon Rosenthal
- Home arena: The Thunderdome (Capacity: 5,000)

2026–27 Big West men's basketball standings
	Conf.				Overall
Team	W		L	PCT	W		L	PCT
UC Irvine	0	–	0	–	3	–	0	1.000
UC Santa Barbara	0	–	0	–	3	–	0	1.000
Cal State Bakersfield	0	–	0	–	2	–	0	1.000
UC Riverside	0	–	0	–	2	–	0	1.000
UC San Diego	0	–	0	–	2	–	0	1.000
Utah Valley	0	–	0	–	2	–	0	1.000
Cal State Fullerton	0	–	0	–	1	–	1	.500
Sacramento State	0	–	0	–	1	–	1	.500
Cal Poly	0	–	0	–	1	–	2	.333
Long Beach State	0	–	0	–	1	–	2	.333
Cal State Northridge	0	–	0	–	0	–	2	.000
California Baptist	0	–	0	–	0	–	3	.000
† 2027 Big West tournament winner As of November 12, 2026; Rankings from AP poll

The 2026–27 UC Santa Barbara Gauchos men's basketball team represents the University of California, Santa Barbara during the 2026–27 NCAA Division I men's basketball season. The Gauchos, led by tenth-year head coach Joe Pasternack, play their home games at The Thunderdome in Santa Barbara, California as members of the Big West Conference.

== Previous season ==
The Gauchos finished the 2025–26 season 18–14, 11–9 in Big West play, to finish in a tie for sixth place. As the #7 seed in the Big West tournament, they were defeated by #6 seed UC Davis in the first round.

== Preseason ==
On October 15, 2026, the Big West Conference released their preseason poll. UC Santa Barbara was picked to finish third in the conference, receiving two out of a possible 12 first-place votes.

=== Preseason rankings ===
Big West Preseason Poll
Place	Team	Votes
1	UC Irvine	114 (7)
2	UC San Diego	105 (3)
3	UC Santa Barbara	103 (2)
4	Cal State Northridge	86
5	Utah Valley	85
6	Cal Poly	75
7	Sacramento State	65
8	Cal State Fullerton	49
9	California Baptist	40
10	Cal State Bakersfield	28
11	UC Riverside	23
12	Long Beach State	19
(#) first-place votes

=== Preseason All-Big West Team ===
Preseason All-Big West Team
Player	Year	Position
Miro Little	Senior	Guard
CJ Shaw	Sophomore	Guard

== Roster ==
2026–27 UC Santa Barbara Gauchos men's basketball team
Players
Coaches

Pos.	#	Name	Height	Weight	Year	Previous school	Hometown
F/C	00	Koat Keat Tong	6 ft 10 in (2.08 m)	220 lb (100 kg)	GS	Crean Lutheran High School	Orange County, California
G	1	Miro Little	6 ft 4 in (1.93 m)	195 lb (88 kg)	Sr	Utah	Tampere, Finland
G	2	Luke Zuffelato	6 ft 5 in (1.96 m)	200 lb (91 kg)	So	Santa Barbara High School	Santa Barbara, California
G	3	CJ Shaw	6 ft 5 in (1.96 m)	190 lb (86 kg)	So	Mojave High School	North Las Vegas, Nevada
G	4	Marvin McGhee IV	6 ft 7 in (2.01 m)	200 lb (91 kg)	Sr	Cal State Bakersfield	Atlanta, Georgia
G	5	RJ Smith	6 ft 3 in (1.91 m)	195 lb (88 kg)	GS	DePaul	Chino, California
G	6	Jordan Charles	6 ft 0 in (1.83 m)	165 lb (75 kg)	Fr	Bella Vista Prep	Scarborough, Ontario
C	7	Marco John Wuol	6 ft 11 in (2.11 m)	220 lb (100 kg)	Fr	IBAM Germany	Munich, Germany
G	8	Viljami Vartiainen	6 ft 6 in (1.98 m)	205 lb (93 kg)	GS	Weber State	Helsinki, Finland
C	9	Eric Dibami	6 ft 10 in (2.08 m)	240 lb (109 kg)	So	FIU	Yaoundé, Cameroon
F	10	Declan Duru Jr.	6 ft 8 in (2.03 m)	230 lb (104 kg)	So	Texas	Munich, Germany
F	12	Antonio Chol	6 ft 9 in (2.06 m)	215 lb (98 kg)	GS	New Mexico	Buffalo, New York
G	20	Aidan Mahaney (5th)	6 ft 3 in (1.91 m)	185 lb (84 kg)	Sr	UConn	Lafayette, California
F	21	John Simcoe	6 ft 5 in (1.96 m)	200 lb (91 kg)	So	Sandra Day O'Connor High School	Phoenix, Arizona
F	23	Michael Simcoe	6 ft 8 in (2.03 m)	225 lb (102 kg)	So	Sandra Day O'Connor High School	Phoenix, Arizona
F	35	Bryce Bedgood	6 ft 11 in (2.11 m)	210 lb (95 kg)	RS So	Valencia High School	Valencia, California

Head coach

- Joe Pasternack (Indiana)

Assistant coach(es)

- Brandon Cyrus (UC Santa Barbara)
- Brian Eskildsen (Tennessee)
- Derek Glasser (Arizona State)
- Brandon Rosenthal (St. John Fisher)

Legend

- (C) Team captain
- (S) Suspended
- (I) Ineligible
- (W) Walk-on
- (5th) Fifth-year senior
- Injured
- Current redshirt

Roster
Last update: November 9, 2026

== Schedule and results ==
Date time, TV	Rank^{#}	Opponent^{#}	Result	Record	High points	High rebounds	High assists	Site (attendance) city, state
Exhibition
October 25, 2026*; 2:00 pm		at Loyola Marymount	W 72–67	–	15 – Tied	7 – McGhee IV	6 – Little	Gersten Pavilion (1,314); Los Angeles, CA
Regular season
November 2, 2026*; 6:00 pm, ESPN+		San Francisco State	W 85–55	1–0	13 – Chol	7 – Duru Jr.	5 – McGhee IV	The Thunderdome (1,773); Santa Barbara, CA
November 7, 2026*; 1:00 pm, ESPN+		Oakland	W 90–67	2–0	20 – Vartiainen	7 – Dibami	8 – Little	The Thunderdome (2,106); Santa Barbara, CA
November 11, 2026*; 6:00 pm, ESPN+		Nevada	W 76–63	3–0	20 – Shaw	8 – Tied	4 – Tied	The Thunderdome (2,297); Santa Barbara, CA
November 15, 2026*; 1:00 pm, ESPN+		UC Merced						The Thunderdome; Santa Barbara, CA
November 19, 2026*; 6:00 pm, ESPN+		at Pepperdine						Firestone Fieldhouse; Malibu, CA
November 24, 2026*; 6:00 pm, ESPN+		UNC Greensboro						The Thunderdome; Santa Barbara, CA
November 27, 2026*; 4:00 pm		vs. Lehigh; Gratitude Thanksgiving Classic						Gilbert Sports and Fitness Center; Thousand Oaks, CA
December 3, 2026; 6:30 pm, ESPN+		at Cal State Bakersfield						Icardo Center; Bakersfield, CA
December 5, 2026; 6:00 pm, ESPN+		Cal Poly; Rivalry						The Thunderdome; Santa Barbara, CA
December 12, 2026*; 7:00 pm		vs. Yale; Jack Jones Classic						Lee's Family Forum; Henderson, NV
December 18, 2026*; 6:00 pm, ESPN+		Weber State						The Thunderdome; Santa Barbara, CA
December 22, 2026*; 4:00 pm		at Fresno State						Save Mart Center; Fresno, CA
December 31, 2026; 6:00 pm, ESPN+		at California Baptist						Fowler Events Center; Riverside, CA
January 2, 2027; 1:00 pm, Spectrum SportsNet		at UC Riverside						SRC Arena; Riverside, CA
January 7, 2027; 6:00 pm, ESPN+		Cal State Fullerton						The Thunderdome; Santa Barbara, CA
January 9, 2027; 6:00 pm, ESPN+		Long Beach State						The Thunderdome; Santa Barbara, CA
January 14, 2027; 5:00 pm, ESPN+		at Utah Valley						UCCU Center; Orem, UT
January 16, 2027; 7:00 pm, ESPN+		at Sacramento State						Hornet Pavilion; Sacramento, CA
January 21, 2027; 6:00 pm, ESPN+		Cal State Northridge						The Thunderdome; Santa Barbara, CA
January 23, 2027; 6:00 pm, ESPN+		Cal State Bakersfield						The Thunderdome; Santa Barbara, CA
January 28, 2027; 6:00 pm, ESPN+		UC San Diego						The Thunderdome; Santa Barbara, CA
January 30, 2027; 6:00 pm, ESPN+		UC Irvine						The Thunderdome; Santa Barbara, CA
February 4, 2027; 7:00 pm, ESPN+		at Long Beach State						LBS Financial Credit Union Pyramid; Long Beach, CA
February 6, 2027; 4:00 pm, ESPN+		at Cal State Fullerton						Titan Gym; Fullerton, CA
February 11, 2027; 6:00 pm, ESPN+		UC Riverside						The Thunderdome; Santa Barbara, CA
February 13, 2027; 6:00 pm, ESPN+		California Baptist						The Thunderdome; Santa Barbara, CA
February 18, 2027; 7:00 pm, ESPN+		at Cal State Northridge						Premier America Credit Union Arena; Northridge, CA
February 20, 2027; 4:00 pm, ESPN+		at Cal Poly; Rivalry						Mott Athletics Center; San Luis Obispo, CA
February 25, 2027; 7:00 pm, ESPN+		at UC Irvine						Bren Events Center; Irvine, CA
February 27, 2027; 6:00 pm, ESPN+		at UC San Diego						LionTree Arena; La Jolla, CA
March 4, 2027; 6:00 pm, ESPN+		Sacramento State						The Thunderdome; Santa Barbara, CA
March 6, 2027; 6:00 pm, ESPN+		Utah Valley						The Thunderdome; Santa Barbara, CA
Big West tournament
March 10–13, 2027		vs.						Lee's Family Forum; Henderson, NV
*Non-conference game. ^{#}Rankings from AP poll. (#) Tournament seedings in parentheses. All times are in Pacific.
