= 2026–27 Long Beach State Beach men's basketball team =

American college basketball season

2026–27 Long Beach State Beach men's basketball
- Conference: Big West Conference
- Record: 1–3 (0–0 Big West)
- Head coach: Chris Acker (3rd season)
- Assistant coaches: Anthony Santos; Phillip Scott; Greg Howell; Jacob Eyman
- Home arena: LBS Financial Credit Union Pyramid

2026–27 Big West men's basketball standings
	Conf.				Overall
Team	W		L	PCT	W		L	PCT
Cal State Bakersfield	0	–	0	–	4	–	0	1.000
UC Santa Barbara	0	–	0	–	4	–	0	1.000
UC Irvine	0	–	0	–	3	–	0	1.000
Utah Valley	0	–	0	–	3	–	0	1.000
UC Riverside	0	–	0	–	3	–	1	.750
UC San Diego	0	–	0	–	3	–	1	.750
Cal State Fullerton	0	–	0	–	2	–	1	.667
Cal Poly	0	–	0	–	2	–	3	.400
Cal State Northridge	0	–	0	–	1	–	2	.333
Sacramento State	0	–	0	–	1	–	2	.333
California Baptist	0	–	0	–	1	–	3	.250
Long Beach State	0	–	0	–	1	–	3	.250
† 2027 Big West tournament winner As of November 17, 2026; Rankings from AP poll

The 2026–27 Long Beach State Beach men's basketball team represent California State University, Long Beach during the 2026–27 NCAA Division I men's basketball season. The Beach, led by third-year head coach Chris Acker, play their home games at the LBS Financial Credit Union Pyramid in Long Beach, California as members of the Big West Conference.

== Previous season ==
The Beach finished the 2025–26 season 10–22, 6–14 in Big West play, to finish in ninth place. They failed to qualify for the Big West tournament, as only the top eight teams qualify for the tournament.

== Preseason ==
On October 15, 2026, the Big West Conference released their preseason poll. Long Beach State was picked to finish 12th in the conference.

=== Preseason rankings ===
Big West Preseason Poll
Place	Team	Votes
1	UC Irvine	114 (7)
2	UC San Diego	105 (3)
3	UC Santa Barbara	103 (2)
4	Cal State Northridge	86
5	Utah Valley	85
6	Cal Poly	75
7	Sacramento State	65
8	Cal State Fullerton	49
9	California Baptist	40
10	Cal State Bakersfield	28
11	UC Riverside	23
12	Long Beach State	19
(#) first-place votes

=== Preseason All-Big West Team ===
No players were named the Preseason All-Big West Team.

== Roster ==
2026–27 Long Beach State Beach men's basketball team
Players
Coaches

Pos.	#	Name	Height	Weight	Year	Previous school	Hometown
G	0	Jaden Tengan	6 ft 0 in (1.83 m)	180 lb (82 kg)	Sr	Cal State Monterey Bay	Sacramento, California
G	3	Yohann Sissoko	6 ft 5 in (1.96 m)	205 lb (93 kg)	So	Florida Atlantic	Paris, France
G	4	McCaden Adams	6 ft 4 in (1.93 m)	185 lb (84 kg)	Jr	Snow College	Pleasant Grove, Utah
F	6	Henry Lau	6 ft 7 in (2.01 m)	195 lb (88 kg)	RS Fr	Pittsburgh	Sydney, Australia
G	7	Jack Payne	6 ft 6 in (1.98 m)	205 lb (93 kg)	Sr	Idaho	Laguna Beach, California
G	8	Ethan Chung	6 ft 7 in (2.01 m)	190 lb (86 kg)	Fr	Punahou School	Honolulu, Hawaii
F	9	JJ Chaikovsky	6 ft 7 in (2.01 m)	220 lb (100 kg)	Jr	Cal State Northridge	Manhattan Beach, California
F	12	Kaleb Smith	6 ft 10 in (2.08 m)	230 lb (104 kg)	Sr	Grand Canyon	Rancho Cucamonga, California
C	13	Noah Amenhauser	7 ft 2 in (2.18 m)	270 lb (122 kg)	Sr	Oregon State	Goodyear, Arizona
F	14	Brett Wright	6 ft 7 in (2.01 m)	200 lb (91 kg)	Jr	Trevecca Nazarene	Chattanooga, Tennessee
F	23	Grgur Brcic	6 ft 10 in (2.08 m)	235 lb (107 kg)	Sr	Bucknell	Zagreb, Croatia
G	24	Christian Jones	6 ft 4 in (1.93 m)	195 lb (88 kg)	Jr	Angelina College	Los Angeles, California
G	25	JJ Gray	6 ft 7 in (2.01 m)	195 lb (88 kg)	Sr	Oberlin College	Fountain Valley, California
F	33	Max Vanlaningham	6 ft 10 in (2.08 m)	225 lb (102 kg)	Fr	Woodcreek High School	Roseville, California
G	88	Blake Bahr	6 ft 2 in (1.88 m)	190 lb (86 kg)	So	Snow College	Keller, Texas

Head coach

- Chris Acker (Chaminade)

Assistant coach(es)

- Anthony Santos (Cal State Fullerton)
- Phillip Scott (Prairie View A&M)
- Greg Howell (Waldorf)
- Jacob Eyman (Portland State)

Legend

- (C) Team captain
- (S) Suspended
- (I) Ineligible
- (W) Walk-on
- Injured
- Current redshirt

Roster
Last update: November 9, 2026

== Schedule and results ==
Date time, TV	Rank^{#}	Opponent^{#}	Result	Record	High points	High rebounds	High assists	Site (attendance) city, state
Exhibition
October 28, 2026*; 7:00 pm		at San Diego State	L 67–92	–	14 – Sissoko	6 – Vanlaningham	3 – Tengan	Viejas Arena (10,789); San Diego, CA
Regular season
November 2, 2026*; 6:00 pm, ESPN+		at Utah	L 63–66	0–1	21 – Adams	5 – Tied	3 – Payne	Jon M. Huntsman Center (6,312); Salt Lake City, UT
November 7, 2026*; 12:00 pm, ESPN+		at Montana State	L 70–83	0–2	17 – Payne	8 – Vanlaningham	2 – Tied	Worthington Arena (2,541); Bozeman, MT
November 11, 2026*; 7:00 pm, ESPN+		Pacific	W 62–59	1–2	18 – Payne	6 – Payne	3 – Payne	LBS Financial Credit Union Pyramid (1,470); Long Beach, CA
November 16, 2026*; 7:00 pm, BTN		at No. 7 UCLA	L 66–105	1–3	19 – Adams	6 – Tied	5 – Payne	Pauley Pavilion (3,729); Los Angeles, CA
November 23, 2026*; 10:00 am, ESPN+		at FIU; FIU Tournament						Ocean Bank Convocation Center; Miami, FL
November 24, 2026*; 12:30 pm, ESPN+		vs. Arkansas State; FIU Tournament						Ocean Bank Convocation Center; Miami, FL
November 25, 2026*; 10:00 am, ESPN+		vs. Southern Utah; FIU Tournament						Ocean Bank Convocation Center; Miami, FL
December 3, 2026; 7:00 pm, ESPN+		Utah Valley						LBS Financial Credit Union Pyramid; Long Beach, CA
December 5, 2026; 6:00 pm, ESPN+		at Cal State Fullerton						Titan Gym; Fullerton, CA
December 8, 2026*; 7:00 pm, MW+		at San Jose State						Provident Credit Union Event Center; San Jose, CA
December 10, 2026*; 4:00 pm, ESPN+		at Illinois State						CEFCU Arena; Normal, IL
December 22, 2026*; 2:00 pm, ESPN+		Portland						LBS Financial Credit Union Pyramid; Long Beach, CA
December 31, 2026; 6:00 pm, ESPN+		UC Irvine						LBS Financial Credit Union Pyramid; Long Beach, CA
January 2, 2027; 6:00 pm, ESPN+		UC San Diego						LBS Financial Credit Union Pyramid; Long Beach, CA
January 7, 2027; 7:00 pm, ESPN+		at Cal Poly						Mott Athletics Center; San Luis Obispo, CA
January 9, 2027; 6:00 pm, ESPN+		at UC Santa Barbara						The Thunderdome; Santa Barbara, CA
January 14, 2027; 7:00 pm, ESPN+		Cal State Northridge						LBS Financial Credit Union Pyramid; Long Beach, CA
January 16, 2027; 6:00 pm, ESPN+		Cal State Bakersfield						LBS Financial Credit Union Pyramid; Long Beach, CA
January 21, 2027; 7:00 pm, ESPN+		at UC San Diego						LionTree Arena; La Jolla, CA
January 23, 2027; 6:00 pm, ESPN+		at UC Irvine						Bren Events Center; Irvine, CA
January 28, 2027; 7:00 pm, ESPN+		at California Baptist						Fowler Events Center; Riverside, CA
January 30, 2027; 7:00 pm, ESPN+		at UC Riverside						SRC Arena; Riverside, CA
February 4, 2027; 7:00 pm, ESPN+		UC Santa Barbara						LBS Financial Credit Union Pyramid; Long Beach, CA
February 6, 2027; 6:00 pm, ESPN+		Cal Poly						LBS Financial Credit Union Pyramid; Long Beach, CA
February 11, 2027; 7:00 pm, ESPN+		at Cal State Bakersfield						Icardo Center; Bakersfield, CA
February 13, 2027; 5:00 pm, ESPN+		at Cal State Northridge						Premier America Credit Union Arena; Northridge, CA
February 18, 2027; 7:00 pm, ESPN+		Sacramento State						LBS Financial Credit Union Pyramid; Long Beach, CA
February 20, 2027; 6:00 pm, ESPN+		Cal State Fullerton						LBS Financial Credit Union Pyramid; Long Beach, CA
February 25, 2027; 7:00 pm, ESPN+		at Utah Valley						UCCU Center; Orem, UT
February 27, 2027; 7:00 pm, ESPN+		at Sacramento State						Hornet Pavilion; Sacramento, CA
March 4, 2027; 7:00 pm, ESPN+		UC Riverside						LBS Financial Credit Union Pyramid; Long Beach, CA
March 6, 2027; 6:00 pm, ESPN+		California Baptist						LBS Financial Credit Union Pyramid; Long Beach, CA
Big West tournament
March 10–13, 2027		vs.						Lee's Family Forum; Henderson, NV
*Non-conference game. ^{#}Rankings from AP poll. (#) Tournament seedings in parentheses. All times are in Pacific.
