= 2026–27 Cal State Bakersfield Roadrunners men's basketball team =

American college basketball season

2026–27 Cal State Bakersfield Roadrunners men's basketball
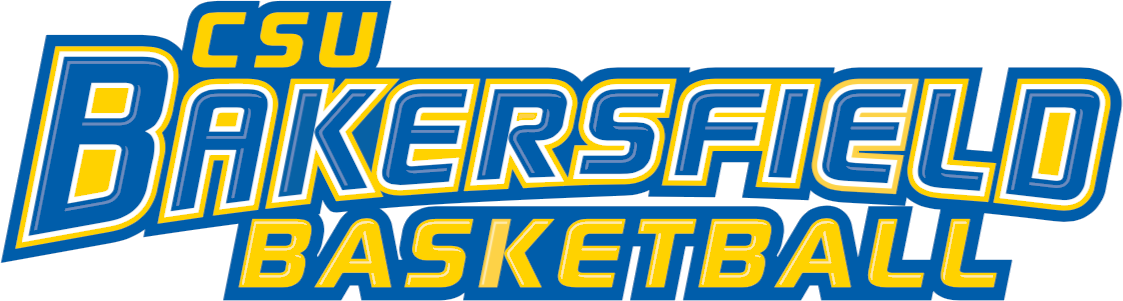
- Conference: Big West Conference
- Record: 1–0 (0–0 Big West)
- Head coach: Todd Lee (1st season)
- Associate head coach: Chris Crevelone (1st season); Eddie Hill (1st season)
- Assistant coach: Russell Payne (1st season)
- Home arena: Icardo Center (Capacity: 3,497)

2026–27 Big West men's basketball standings
	Conf.				Overall
Team	W		L	PCT	W		L	PCT
Cal State Bakersfield	0	–	0	–	2	–	0	1.000
UC Irvine	0	–	0	–	2	–	0	1.000
UC Riverside	0	–	0	–	2	–	0	1.000
UC San Diego	0	–	0	–	2	–	0	1.000
UC Santa Barbara	0	–	0	–	2	–	0	1.000
Utah Valley	0	–	0	–	2	–	0	1.000
Cal Poly	0	–	0	–	1	–	1	.500
Cal State Fullerton	0	–	0	–	1	–	1	.500
Sacramento State	0	–	0	–	1	–	1	.500
California Baptist	0	–	0	–	0	–	2	.000
Cal State Northridge	0	–	0	–	0	–	2	.000
Long Beach State	0	–	0	–	0	–	2	.000
† 2027 Big West tournament winner As of November 12, 2026; Rankings from AP poll

The 2026–27 Cal State Bakersfield Roadrunners men's basketball team will represent the California State University, Bakersfield during the 2026–27 NCAA Division I men's basketball season. The Roadrunners will be led by first-year head coach Todd Lee and will play their home games at the Icardo Center in Bakersfield, California as a member of the Big West Conference.

== Previous season ==
On September 24, 2025, prior to the start of the season, fourteen-year head coach Rod Barnes resigned amid a controversy involving assistant coach Kevin Mays, who had been charged with several sex crime related felonies. Athletic Director Kyle Condor also resigned amid the scandal. Acting Athletic Director Sarah Touhy named assistant coach Mike Scott as the team's interim head coach for the season.

Cal State Bakersfield finished the 2025-26 season 8–24, 2–18 in the Big West Conference to finish eleventh in the conference. The Roadrunners did not qualify for the Big West Tournament.

On March 26, 2026, the school announced USC assistant coach Todd Lee - a former Cal State Bakersfield assistant coach - as the program's new head coach.

== Offseason ==
=== Departures ===
Cal State Bakersfield Roadrunners departures
Name	Number	Pos.	Height	Weight	Year	Hometown	Reason for departure
CJ Hardy	0	G	6'3"	175	Senior	Gardena, CA	Out of eligibility
Tom Mark	1	F	6'7"	200	Graduate	Affligem, Belgium	Out of eligibility
Mike Price	2	G	6'3"	185	(redshirt) Freshman	Chicago, IL	Transferred to Chicago State
Dylan Purnell	3	G	6'5"	185	Sophomore	Raleigh, NC	Transferred to Coker
Caleb McCarty	4	F	6'8"	195	Graduate	Biloxi, MS	Out of eligibility
Bentley Waller	5	G	6'4"	185	(redshirt) Freshman	Bakersfield, CA	Transferred to Itawamba CC
Pierre Genesté Jr.	7	C	6'11"	220	Senior	Port-au-Prince, Haiti	Out of eligibility
AJ George	10	G/F	6'5"	210	Senior	Fresno, CA	Out of eligibility
Colin Darby	11	F	6'7"	200	Sophomore	Frisco, TX	Transferred to Navarro
Kadar Waller	12	G	5'11"	185	Graduate	Bakersfield, CA	Out of eligibility
Dailin Smith	15	G	6'6"	195	Senior	Colorado Springs, CO	Out of eligibility
Ronald Jessamy	21	F	6'8"	220	Junior	Philadelphia, PA	Transferred to Texas State
Tory James Jr.	40	G	6'1"	175	Freshman	The Woodlands, TX	Transferred to Mississippi Valley State

=== Incoming transfers ===
Cal State Bakersfield Roadrunners incoming transfers
Name	Number	Pos.	Height	Weight	Year	Hometown	Previous School
Snookey Wigington	0	G	5'9"	-	Graduate	Los Angeles, CA	Ventura College
Blake Dibble	2	G	6'6"	180	Junior	Bakersfield, CA	Hartnell College
Kjay Bradley	5	G	6'1"	-	Graduate	Inglewood, CA	San Diego
Iliyan Pishtikov	7	G	6'3"	200	Sophomore	Botevgrad, Bulgaria	BC Balkan Botevgrad
Chudi Diaromma	10	F	6'10"	240	Senior	London, United Kingdom	Arkansas State
Bryce Cofield	12	G	6'7"	210	Sophomore	Los Angeles, CA	Cal State Fullerton
Pietro Iannuzzi	18	G	6'6"	205	Freshman	Turin, Italy	Pallacanestro Trieste
Cameron Barnes	23	F	6'10"	-	Senior	Dallas, TX	Illinois State
Sean Pouedet	27	G	6'2"	190	Junior	Vilvoorde, Belgium	Dayton
Tom Koppens	30	F	6'8"	220	Senior	Melbourne, Australia	Melbourne United
Petar Ivancic	44	F	6'10"	225	Freshman	Pula, Croatia	KK Cedevita Junior Zagreb

=== 2026 recruiting class ===
College recruiting
Name	Hometown	School	Height	Weight	Commit date
Kristian Payne; SG/SF	Oklahoma City, OK	Terra Verde Prep	6 ft 6 in (1.98 m)	190 lb (86 kg)	May 27, 2026
Kristian Payne; SG/SF	Recruit ratings: (NR)				
Overall recruit ranking: Scout: – Rivals: –
Note: In many cases, Scout, Rivals, 247Sports, On3, and ESPN may conflict in their listings of height and weight.; In these cases, the average was taken. ESPN grades are on a 100-point scale.; Sources: "2026 Cal State Bakersfield Basketball Recruiting Commits". Scout.; "Scout.com Team Recruiting Rankings". Scout.; "2026 Team Ranking". Rivals.

== Roster ==
2026–27 Cal State Bakersfield Roadrunners men's basketball team
Players
Coaches

Pos.	#	Name	Height	Weight	Year	Previous school	Hometown
G	0	Snookey Wigington	5 ft 9 in (1.75 m)	—	GS	Ventura College	Los Angeles, California
G	2	Kristian Payne	6 ft 6 in (1.98 m)	195 lb (88 kg)	Fr	Terra Verde Prep	Oklahoma City, Oklahoma
G	3	Blake Dibble	6 ft 2 in (1.88 m)	180 lb (82 kg)	Jr	Hartnell College	Bakersfield, California
G	5	Kjay Bradley	6 ft 1 in (1.85 m)	—	GS	San Diego	Inglewood, California
G	7	Iliyan Pishtikov	6 ft 3 in (1.91 m)	200 lb (91 kg)	So	BC Balkan Botevgrad	Botevgrad, Bulgaria
F	10	Chudi Diaromma	6 ft 10 in (2.08 m)	240 lb (109 kg)	Sr	Arkansas State	London, United Kingdom
G	12	Bryce Cofield	6 ft 7 in (2.01 m)	210 lb (95 kg)	So	Cal State Fullerton	Los Angeles, California
G	18	Pietro Iannuzzi	6 ft 6 in (1.98 m)	205 lb (93 kg)	Fr	Pallacanestro Trieste	Turin, Italy
F	23	Cameron Barnes	6 ft 10 in (2.08 m)	—	Sr	Illinois State	Dallas, Texas
G/F	25	Jaden Alexander	6 ft 4 in (1.93 m)	210 lb (95 kg)	GS	New Mexico State	Fairfield, California
G	27	Sean Pouedet	6 ft 2 in (1.88 m)	190 lb (86 kg)	Jr	Dayton	Vilvoorde, Belgium
F	30	Tom Koppens	6 ft 8 in (2.03 m)	220 lb (100 kg)	Sr	Melbourne United	Melbourne, Australia
F	44	Petar Ivancic	6 ft 10 in (2.08 m)	225 lb (102 kg)	Fr	KK Cedevita Junior Zagreb	Pula, Croatia

Head coach

- Todd Lee (South Dakota)

Assistant coach(es)

- Chris Crevelone (Adams State)
- Eddie Hill (Washington State)
- Russell Payne (Purdue Global)

Legend

- (C) Team captain
- (S) Suspended
- (I) Ineligible
- (W) Walk-on
- Injured
- Current redshirt

Roster

== Schedule and results ==
Date time, TV	Rank^{#}	Opponent^{#}	Result	Record	High points	High rebounds	High assists	Site (attendance) city, state
Exhibition
October 18, 2026*; 12:00 p.m.		at Eastern Washington	L 65–71	-	19 – Cofield	7 – Cofield	2 – Cofield	Reese Court (243); Cheney, WA
October 24, 2026*; 6:00 p.m.		at Montana	L 78–84	-	24 – Alexander	9 – Payne	10 – Bradley	Dahlberg Arena (-); Missoula, MT
October 31, 2026*; 3:00 p.m.		Redlands	W 128–76		–	–	–	Icardo Center; Bakersfield, CA
Regular season
November 5, 2026*; 6:30 p.m., ESPN+		Stanton	W 93–54	1–0	23 – Tied	9 – Cofield	6 – Bradley	Icardo Center (603); Bakersfield, CA
November 8, 2026*; 3:00 p.m., ESPN+		North Dakota State						Icardo Center; Bakersfield, CA
November 12, 2026*; 3:00 p.m., ESPN+		at Western Illinois						Western Hall; Macomb, IL
November 15, 2026*; 11:00 a.m., SLN		at North Dakota State						Scheels Center; Fargo, ND
November 20, 2026*; 6:00 p.m., ESPN+		at Idaho						ICCU Arena; Moscow, ID
November 25, 2026*; 5:00 p.m., ESPN+		at Pepperdine						The Mountain at Mullin Park; Malibu, CA
November 28, 2026*; 2:00 p.m., ESPN+		Northern Arizona						Icardo Center; Bakersfield, CA
December 3, 2026; 6:30 p.m., ESPN+		UC Santa Barbara						Icardo Center; Bakersfield, CA
December 5, 2026; 2:00 p.m., ESPN+		Cal State Northridge						Icardo Center; Bakersfield, CA
December 12, 2026*; 6:30 p.m., ESPN+		Whittier						Icardo Center; Bakersfield, CA
December 19, 2026*; 7:00 p.m., ESPN+		at Loyola Marymount						Gersten Pavilion; Los Angeles, CA
December 22, 2026*; 7:00 p.m., ESPN+		at San Diego						Jenny Craig Pavilion; San Diego, CA
December 31, 2026; 1:00 p.m., ESPN+		at Utah Valley						UCCU Center; Orem, UT
January 2, 2027; 7:00 p.m., ESPN+		at Sacramento State						Hornet Pavilion; Sacramento, CA
January 7, 2027; 6:30 p.m., ESPN+		UC Riverside						Icardo Center; Bakersfield, CA
January 9, 2027; 2:00 p.m., ESPN+		California Baptist						Icardo Center; Bakersfield, CA
January 14, 2027; 7:00 p.m., ESPN+		at Cal State Fullerton						Titan Gym; Fullerton, CA
January 16, 2027; TBD, ESPN+		at Long Beach State						LBS Financial Credit Union Pyramid; Long Beach, CA
January 21, 2027; 7:00 p.m., ESPN+		at Cal Poly						Mott Athletics Center; San Luis Obispo, CA
January 23, 2027; 6:00 p.m., ESPN+		at UC Santa Barbara						The Thunderdome; Santa Barbara, CA
January 28, 2027; 8:00 p.m., ESPN+		Sacramento State						Icardo Center; Bakersfield, CA
January 30, 2027; 2:00 p.m., ESPN+		Utah Valley						Icardo Center; Bakersfield, CA
February 4, 2027; 7:00 p.m., ESPN+		at UC Irvine						Bren Events Center; Irvine, CA
February 6, 2027; 6:00 p.m., ESPN+		at UC San Diego						LionTree Arena; La Jolla, CA
February 11, 2027; 6:30 p.m., ESPN+		Long Beach State						Icardo Center; Bakersfield, CA
February 13, 2027; 6:30 p.m., ESPN+		Cal State Fullerton						Icardo Center; Bakersfield, CA
February 18, 2027; 11:00 a.m., ESPN+		Cal Poly						Icardo Center; Bakersfield, CA
February 20, 2027; 5:00 p.m., ESPN+		at Cal State Northridge						Premier America Credit Union Arena; Northridge, CA
February 25, 2027; 7:00 p.m., ESPN+		at California Baptist						Fowler Events Center; Riverside, CA
February 27, 2027; 5:00 p.m., ESPN+		UC Riverside						SRC Arena; Riverside, CA
March 4, 2027; 6:30 p.m., ESPN+		UC San Diego						Icardo Center; Bakersfield, CA
March 6, 2027; 2:00 p.m., ESPN+		UC Irvine						Icardo Center; Bakersfield, CA
Big West tournament
March 10, 2027; TBD, TBD		vs. TBD						Lee's Family Forum; Henderson, NV
*Non-conference game. ^{#}Rankings from AP Poll. (#) Tournament seedings in parentheses. All times are in Pacific Time.
