= 2026–27 Cal State Northridge Matadors men's basketball team =

American college basketball season

2026–27 Cal State Northridge Matadors men's basketball
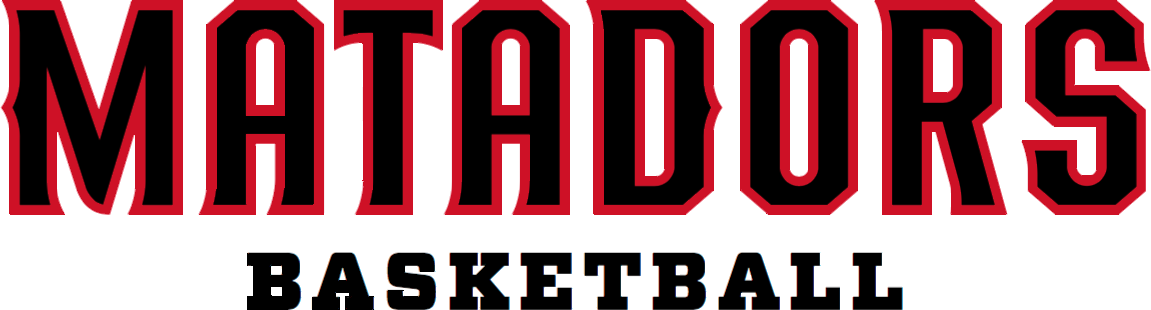
- Conference: Big West Conference
- Record: 1–2 (0–0 Big West)
- Head coach: Andy Newman (4th season)
- Assistant coaches: Scott Cutley; CJ Killin; Brandon Shingles
- Home arena: Premier America Credit Union Arena

2026–27 Big West men's basketball standings
	Conf.				Overall
Team	W		L	PCT	W		L	PCT
Cal State Bakersfield	0	–	0	–	3	–	0	1.000
UC Irvine	0	–	0	–	3	–	0	1.000
UC Santa Barbara	0	–	0	–	3	–	0	1.000
Utah Valley	0	–	0	–	3	–	0	1.000
UC Riverside	0	–	0	–	3	–	1	.750
Cal State Fullerton	0	–	0	–	2	–	1	.667
UC San Diego	0	–	0	–	2	–	1	.667
Cal Poly	0	–	0	–	2	–	2	.500
Cal State Northridge	0	–	0	–	1	–	2	.333
Long Beach State	0	–	0	–	1	–	2	.333
Sacramento State	0	–	0	–	1	–	2	.333
California Baptist	0	–	0	–	1	–	3	.250
† 2027 Big West tournament winner As of November 15, 2026; Rankings from AP poll

The 2026–27 Cal State Northridge Matadors men's basketball team represents California State University, Northridge during the 2026–27 NCAA Division I men's basketball season. The Matadors, led by fourth-year head coach Andy Newman, play their home games at the Premier America Credit Union Arena in Northridge, California as members of the Big West Conference.

== Previous season ==
The Matadors finished the 2025–26 season 20–14, 12–8 in Big West play, to finish in a three-way tie for third place. As the #4 seed in the Big West tournament, they defeated #5 seed UC San Diego in the quarterfinals, before falling to top-seeded UC Irvine in the semifinals.

== Preseason ==
On October 15, 2026, the Big West Conference released their preseason poll. Cal State Northridge was picked to finish fourth in the conference.

=== Preseason rankings ===
Big West Preseason Poll
Place	Team	Votes
1	UC Irvine	114 (7)
2	UC San Diego	105 (3)
3	UC Santa Barbara	103 (2)
4	Cal State Northridge	86
5	Utah Valley	85
6	Cal Poly	75
7	Sacramento State	65
8	Cal State Fullerton	49
9	California Baptist	40
10	Cal State Bakersfield	28
11	UC Riverside	23
12	Long Beach State	19
(#) first-place votes

=== Preseason All-Big West Team ===
Preseason All-Big West Team
Player	Year	Position
Josiah Davis	Fifth Year	Guard

== Roster ==
2026–27 Cal State Northridge Matadors men's basketball team
Players
Coaches

Pos.	#	Name	Height	Weight	Year	Previous school	Hometown
G	0	Naceiar Kirksey	6 ft 0 in (1.83 m)	203 lb (92 kg)	Jr	Monroe	Newark, New Jersey
G	1	Caleb Smith (5th)	6 ft 5 in (1.96 m)	205 lb (93 kg)	Sr	Rider	Atlanta, Georgia
G	2	Mikah Ballew	6 ft 5 in (1.96 m)	200 lb (91 kg)	Jr	Portland	Palmdale, California
G	3	Jalen Barbee (5th)	6 ft 6 in (1.98 m)	205 lb (93 kg)	Sr	Cochise College	Tacoma, Washington
G	4	Josiah Davis (5th)	6 ft 3 in (1.91 m)	195 lb (88 kg)	Sr	Niagara	Kitchener, Ontario
G	5	Quinton Webb (5th)	6 ft 6 in (1.98 m)	205 lb (93 kg)	Sr	New Mexico	San Bernardino, California
G	7	Daniel Culberson	6 ft 0 in (1.83 m)	180 lb (82 kg)	Jr	Howard College	Little Rock, Arkansas
F	8	Jael Martin	6 ft 9 in (2.06 m)	205 lb (93 kg)	Jr	Loyola Marymount	Carlsbad, California
G	10	Greg Gazarian	6 ft 0 in (1.83 m)	175 lb (79 kg)	Jr	Saint Francis High School	La Cañada Flintridge, California
G	11	Jordan Hare	6 ft 5 in (1.96 m)	180 lb (82 kg)	Jr	Pepperdine	Vancouver, British Columbia
G	14	Omer Dahan	6 ft 0 in (1.83 m)	165 lb (75 kg)	RS Fr	SoCal Academy	Los Angeles, California
F	20	BJ Omot (5th)	6 ft 8 in (2.03 m)	200 lb (91 kg)	Sr	Minnesota	Mankato, Minnesota
C	22	Lamine Niang (5th)	6 ft 9 in (2.06 m)	230 lb (104 kg)	Sr	UT Martin	Thiès, Senegal
G	24	Keziah Ekissi (5th)	6 ft 3 in (1.91 m)	210 lb (95 kg)	Sr	Oregon State	Saintes-Maries-de-la-Mer, France
C	34	Emmanuel Stephen	7 ft 0 in (2.13 m)	230 lb (104 kg)	Jr	UNLV	Lagos, Nigeria
G	44	Brooklyn Hicks	6 ft 3 in (1.91 m)	185 lb (84 kg)	Sr	Montana	Lacey, Washington

Head coach

- Andy Newman (Azusa Pacific)

Assistant coach(es)

- Scott Cutley (Cal State Fullerton)
- CJ Killin (Nebraska–Kearney)
- Brandon Shingles (Morehead State)

Legend

- (C) Team captain
- (S) Suspended
- (I) Ineligible
- (W) Walk-on
- (5th) Fifth-year senior
- Injured
- Current redshirt

Roster
Last update: November 15, 2026

== Schedule and results ==
Date time, TV	Rank^{#}	Opponent^{#}	Result	Record	High points	High rebounds	High assists	Site (attendance) city, state
Regular season
November 4, 2026*; 4:30 pm, ESPN+		at Wichita State	L 67–79	0–1	17 – Ballew	9 – Hicks	6 – Davis	Charles Koch Arena (6,316); Wichita, KS
November 6, 2026*; 6:00 pm, ESPN+		at Kansas State	L 78–95	0–2	23 – Ballew	7 – Tied	5 – Davis	Bramlage Coliseum (7,012); Manhattan, KS
November 12, 2026*; 7:00 pm, ESPN+		Grace U	W 108–69	1–2	24 – Ballew	10 – Hicks	10 – Davis	Premier America Credit Union Arena (761); Northridge, CA
November 17, 2026*; 4:00 pm, ESPN+		at Troy						Trojan Arena; Troy, AL
November 20, 2026*; 3:00 pm, ESPN+		Delaware						Premier America Credit Union Arena; Northridge, CA
November 25, 2026*; 3:00 pm, ESPN+		at Weber State						Dee Events Center; Ogden, UT
December 3, 2026; 7:00 pm, ESPN+		Cal Poly						Premier America Credit Union Arena; Northridge, CA
December 5, 2026; 2:00 pm, ESPN+		at Cal State Bakersfield						Icardo Center; Bakersfield, CA
December 9, 2026*; 6:00 pm, ESPN+		at Fresno State						Save Mart Center; Fresno, CA
December 12, 2026*; 7:00 pm, ESPN+		North Dakota						Premier America Credit Union Arena; Northridge, CA
December 19, 2026*; 7:00 pm, ESPN+		La Sierra						Premier America Credit Union Arena; Northridge, CA
December 22, 2026*; 7:00 pm, ESPN+		North Dakota State						Premier America Credit Union Arena; Northridge, CA
December 31, 2026; 1:00 pm, ESPN+		at Sacramento State						Hornet Pavilion; Sacramento, CA
January 2, 2027; 1:00 pm, ESPN+		at Utah Valley						UCCU Center; Orem, UT
January 7, 2027; 7:00 pm, ESPN+		California Baptist						Premier America Credit Union Arena; Northridge, CA
January 9, 2027; 5:00 pm, ESPN+		UC Riverside						Premier America Credit Union Arena; Northridge, CA
January 14, 2027; 7:00 pm, ESPN+		at Long Beach State						LBS Financial Credit Union Pyramid; Long Beach, CA
January 16, 2027; 4:00 pm, ESPN+		at Cal State Fullerton						Titan Gym; Fullerton, CA
January 21, 2027; 6:00 pm, ESPN+		at UC Santa Barbara						The Thunderdome; Santa Barbara, CA
January 23, 2027; 7:00 pm, ESPN+/Spectrum SportsNet		at Cal Poly						Mott Athletics Center; San Luis Obispo, CA
January 28, 2027; 7:00 pm, ESPN+		Utah Valley						Premier America Credit Union Arena; Northridge, CA
January 30, 2027; 5:00 pm, ESPN+		Sacramento State						Premier America Credit Union Arena; Northridge, CA
February 4, 2027; 7:00 pm, ESPN+		at UC San Diego						LionTree Arena; La Jolla, CA
February 6, 2027; 7:00 pm, ESPN+		at UC Irvine						Bren Events Center; Irvine, CA
February 11, 2027; 7:00 pm, ESPN+		Cal State Fullerton						Premier America Credit Union Arena; Northridge, CA
February 13, 2027; 7:00 pm, ESPN+/Spectrum SportsNet		Long Beach State						Premier America Credit Union Arena; Northridge, CA
February 18, 2027; 7:00 pm, ESPN+		UC Santa Barbara						Premier America Credit Union Arena; Northridge, CA
February 20, 2027; 5:00 pm, ESPN+		Cal State Bakersfield						Premier America Credit Union Arena; Northridge, CA
February 25, 2027; 7:00 pm, ESPN+		at UC Riverside						SRC Arena; Riverside, CA
February 27, 2027; 5:00 pm, ESPN+		at California Baptist						Fowler Events Center; Riverside, CA
March 4, 2027; 8:00 pm, ESPN+/Spectrum SportsNet		UC Irvine						Premier America Credit Union Arena; Northridge, CA
March 6, 2027; 5:00 pm, ESPN+		UC San Diego						Premier America Credit Union Arena; Northridge, CA
Big West tournament
March 10–13, 2027		vs.						Lee's Family Forum; Henderson, NV
*Non-conference game. ^{#}Rankings from AP poll. (#) Tournament seedings in parentheses. All times are in Pacific.
