= 2026–27 Cal Poly Mustangs men's basketball team =

American college basketball season

2026–27 Cal Poly Mustangs men's basketball
- Conference: Big West Conference
- Record: 2–2 (0–0 Big West)
- Head coach: Mike DeGeorge (3rd season)
- Associate head coach: Kyle Bossier
- Assistant coaches: BJ Andrews; Sam Walters; Ron DuBois; James Andrisevic
- Home arena: Mott Athletics Center (Capacity: 3,032)

2026–27 Big West men's basketball standings
	Conf.				Overall
Team	W		L	PCT	W		L	PCT
Cal State Bakersfield	0	–	0	–	3	–	0	1.000
UC Irvine	0	–	0	–	3	–	0	1.000
UC Santa Barbara	0	–	0	–	3	–	0	1.000
Utah Valley	0	–	0	–	3	–	0	1.000
UC Riverside	0	–	0	–	3	–	1	.750
Cal State Fullerton	0	–	0	–	2	–	1	.667
UC San Diego	0	–	0	–	2	–	1	.667
Cal Poly	0	–	0	–	2	–	2	.500
Cal State Northridge	0	–	0	–	1	–	2	.333
Long Beach State	0	–	0	–	1	–	2	.333
Sacramento State	0	–	0	–	1	–	2	.333
California Baptist	0	–	0	–	1	–	3	.250
† 2027 Big West tournament winner As of November 15, 2026; Rankings from AP poll

The 2026–27 Cal Poly Mustangs men's basketball team represents California Polytechnic State University, San Luis Obispo during the 2026–27 NCAA Division I men's basketball season. The Mustangs, led by third-year head coach Mike DeGeorge, play their home games at the Mott Athletics Center in San Luis Obispo, California as members of the Big West Conference.

== Previous season ==
The Mustangs finished the 2025–26 season 14–19, 10–10 in Big West play, to finish in eighth place. As the #8 seed in the Big West tournament, they were defeated by #5 seed UC San Diego in the first round.

== Preseason ==
On October 15, 2026, the Big West Conference released their preseason poll. Cal Poly was picked to finish sixth in the conference.

=== Preseason rankings ===
Big West Preseason Poll
Place	Team	Votes
1	UC Irvine	114 (7)
2	UC San Diego	105 (3)
3	UC Santa Barbara	103 (2)
4	Cal State Northridge	86
5	Utah Valley	85
6	Cal Poly	75
7	Sacramento State	65
8	Cal State Fullerton	49
9	California Baptist	40
10	Cal State Bakersfield	28
11	UC Riverside	23
12	Long Beach State	19
(#) first-place votes

=== Preseason All-Big West Team ===
Preseason All-Big West Team
Player	Year	Position
Hamad Mousa	Junior	Guard/Forward

== Roster ==
2026–27 Cal Poly Mustangs men's basketball team
Players
Coaches

Pos.	#	Name	Height	Weight	Year	Previous school	Hometown
G	00	Jason Scott	6 ft 4 in (1.93 m)	190 lb (86 kg)	So	Legacy School of Sport Sciences	Houston, Texas
G	1	Jess Esso Essis	6 ft 10 in (2.08 m)	210 lb (95 kg)	So	ESSM Le Portel	Le Mans, France
F	2	Braden Freeman	6 ft 6 in (1.98 m)	200 lb (91 kg)	So	Moline High School	Moline, Illinois
G	3	Jake Davis	6 ft 4 in (1.93 m)	175 lb (79 kg)	Sr	West Valley College	Walnut Creek, California
G	4	Kieran Elliott	6 ft 6 in (1.98 m)	215 lb (98 kg)	Sr	West Texas A&M	Lubbock, Texas
G	5	Guzman Vasilic	6 ft 4 in (1.93 m)	200 lb (91 kg)	Jr	Southeastern Oklahoma	Montevideo, Uruguay
F	7	Ali Assran	6 ft 9 in (2.06 m)	210 lb (95 kg)	So	NBA Academy Africa	Cairo, Egypt
PG	8	Jackson Mosley	5 ft 10 in (1.78 m)	170 lb (77 kg)	Sr	Saint Francis High School	La Cañada, California
G/F	10	Hamad Mousa	6 ft 8 in (2.03 m)	200 lb (91 kg)	Jr	Dayton	Doha, Qatar
F	11	Austin Goode	6 ft 7 in (2.01 m)	200 lb (91 kg)	So	Bella Vista Prep	Brampton, Ontario
G	12	Canon Wyatt	5 ft 11 in (1.8 m)	160 lb (73 kg)	Fr	Highland Park High School	Dallas, Texas
F	13	Troy Plumtree	6 ft 6 in (1.98 m)	215 lb (98 kg)	So	Wellington College	Wellington, New Zealand
G	14	Cayden Ward	6 ft 6 in (1.98 m)	210 lb (95 kg)	Jr	St. Mary's High School	Stockton, California
PF	15	Aaron Price Jr. (5th)	6 ft 8 in (2.03 m)	225 lb (102 kg)	Sr	Liberty High School	Las Vegas, Nevada
G	24	Anthony Moore	6 ft 5 in (1.96 m)	190 lb (86 kg)	So	Weber State	Stockton, California

Head coach

- Mike DeGeorge (Monmouth (IL))

Assistant coach(es)

- Kyle Bossier (LSU)
- BJ Andrews (Clarion)
- Sam Walters (Colorado Mesa)
- Ron DuBois (Arizona State)
- James Andrisevic (Arizona State)

Legend

- (C) Team captain
- (S) Suspended
- (I) Ineligible
- (W) Walk-on
- (5th) Fifth-year senior
- Injured
- Current redshirt

Roster
Last update: November 15, 2026

== Schedule and results ==
Date time, TV	Rank^{#}	Opponent^{#}	Result	Record	High points	High rebounds	High assists	Site (attendance) city, state
Exhibition
October 23, 2026*; 11:00 am		Westmont	L 93–105	–	20 – Mousa	9 – Mousa	3 – Tied	Mott Athletics Center (1,000); San Luis Obispo, CA
Regular season
November 2, 2026*; 7:30 pm, ESPN+		Cal State San Marcos	W 78–62	1–0	18 – Mousa	11 – Ward	5 – Tied	Mott Athletics Center (1,028); San Luis Obispo, CA
November 5, 2026*; 7:30 pm, TruTV/HBO Max		at No. 5 Arizona	L 84–104	1–1	30 – Mousa	5 – Assran	3 – Tied	McKale Center (13,989); Tucson, AZ
November 11, 2026*; 6:00 pm, MW+		at Grand Canyon	L 71–99	1–2	16 – Mousa	6 – Plumtree	2 – Tied	Global Credit Union Arena (6,880); Phoenix, AZ
November 13, 2026*; 6:00 pm, ESPN+		at Idaho	W 83–74	2–2	19 – Mousa	8 – Esso Essis	4 – Esso Essis	ICCU Arena (2,228); Moscow, ID
November 15, 2026*; 3:00 pm, ESPN+		at Montana State						Worthington Arena; Bozeman, MT
November 21, 2026*; 4:00 pm, ESPN+		Northern Arizona						Mott Athletics Center; San Luis Obispo, CA
December 3, 2026; 7:00 pm, ESPN+		at Cal State Northridge						Premier America Credit Union Arena; Northridge, CA
December 5, 2026; 6:00 pm, ESPN+		at UC Santa Barbara; Rivalry						The Thunderdome; Santa Barbara, CA
December 12, 2026*; 2:30 pm, ESPN+		Montana						Mott Athletics Center; San Luis Obispo, CA
December 15, 2026*; 6:00 pm, ESPN+		at Colorado						CU Events Center; Boulder, CO
December 22, 2026*; 7:00 pm, ESPN+		at UNLV						Thomas & Mack Center; Paradise, NV
December 31, 2026; 2:00 pm, ESPN+		at UC Riverside						SRC Arena; Riverside, CA
January 2, 2027; 5:00 pm, ESPN+		at California Baptist						Fowler Events Center; Riverside, CA
January 7, 2027; 7:00 pm, ESPN+		Long Beach State						Mott Athletics Center; San Luis Obispo, CA
January 9, 2027; 4:00 pm, ESPN+		Cal State Fullerton						Mott Athletics Center; San Luis Obispo, CA
January 14, 2027; 7:00 pm, ESPN+		at Sacramento State						Hornet Pavilion; Sacramento, CA
January 16, 2027; 1:00 pm, ESPN+		at Utah Valley						UCCU Center; Orem, UT
January 21, 2027; 7:00 pm, ESPN+		Cal State Bakersfield						Mott Athletics Center; San Luis Obispo, CA
January 23, 2027; 4:00 pm, ESPN+/Spectrum SportsNet		Cal State Northridge						Mott Athletics Center; San Luis Obispo, CA
January 28, 2027; 7:00 pm, ESPN+		UC Irvine						Mott Athletics Center; San Luis Obispo, CA
January 30, 2027; 4:00 pm, ESPN+		UC San Diego						Mott Athletics Center; San Luis Obispo, CA
February 4, 2027; 7:00 pm, ESPN+		at Cal State Fullerton						Titan Gym; Fullerton, CA
February 6, 2027; 6:00 pm, ESPN+		at Long Beach State						LBS Financial Credit Union Pyramid; Long Beach, CA
February 11, 2027; 7:00 pm, ESPN+/Spectrum SportsNet		California Baptist						Mott Athletics Center; San Luis Obispo, CA
February 13, 2027; 4:00 pm, ESPN+		UC Riverside						Mott Athletics Center; San Luis Obispo, CA
February 18, 2027; 11:00 am, ESPN+		at Cal State Bakersfield						Icardo Center; Bakersfield, CA
February 20, 2027; 4:00 pm, ESPN+		UC Santa Barbara; Rivalry						Mott Athletics Center; San Luis Obispo, CA
February 25, 2027; 7:00 pm, ESPN+		at UC San Diego						LionTree Arena; La Jolla, CA
February 27, 2027; 7:00 pm, ESPN+		at UC Irvine						Bren Events Center; Irvine, CA
March 4, 2027; 7:00 pm, ESPN+		Utah Valley						Mott Athletics Center; San Luis Obispo, CA
March 6, 2027; 4:00 pm, ESPN+		Sacramento State						Mott Athletics Center; San Luis Obispo, CA
Big West tournament
March 10–13, 2027		vs.						Lee's Family Forum; Henderson, NV
*Non-conference game. ^{#}Rankings from AP poll. (#) Tournament seedings in parentheses. All times are in Pacific.
