= 2026–27 California Baptist Lancers men's basketball team =

American college basketball season

2026–27 California Baptist Lancers men's basketball
- Conference: Western Athletic Conference
- Record: 0–2 (0–0 WAC)
- Head coach: Kyle Getter (1st season)
- Associate head coach: Hardy Asprilla
- Assistant coaches: Doc Wellman; Scott Clark; Dominic Lippi; Reginald Howard
- Home arena: Fowler Events Center

2026–27 Big West men's basketball standings
	Conf.				Overall
Team	W		L	PCT	W		L	PCT
UC Irvine	0	–	0	–	2	–	0	1.000
UC Riverside	0	–	0	–	2	–	0	1.000
UC San Diego	0	–	0	–	2	–	0	1.000
UC Santa Barbara	0	–	0	–	2	–	0	1.000
Utah Valley	0	–	0	–	2	–	0	1.000
Cal State Bakersfield	0	–	0	–	1	–	0	1.000
Cal Poly	0	–	0	–	1	–	1	.500
Cal State Fullerton	0	–	0	–	1	–	1	.500
Sacramento State	0	–	0	–	1	–	1	.500
California Baptist	0	–	0	–	0	–	2	.000
Cal State Northridge	0	–	0	–	0	–	2	.000
Long Beach State	0	–	0	–	0	–	2	.000
† 2027 Big West tournament winner As of November 8, 2026; Rankings from AP poll

The 2026-27 California Baptist Lancers men's basketball team will represent California Baptist University during the 2026-27 NCAA Division I men's basketball season. The Lancers, will be led by first-year head coach Kyle Getter, playing their home games at Fowler Events Center in Riverside, California, as a first-year member of the Big West Conference (Big West).

This year will mark the Lancers' first season as members the Big West, after playing the last 8 season in the Western Athletic Conference (WAC) from 2018-2026.

== Previous season ==
The Lancers finished the 2025–26 season 25–9, 13–5 in WAC play, to finish in second place. As the No. 2 seed in the WAC Tournament, they would beat No. 3 Southern Utah in the Semifinals and No. 1 seed Utah Valley in the Championship Game gaining the conference's automatic bid to the 2026 NCAA Division I men's basketball tournament. As the 13th seed in the East Regional, they would lose in the first round to 4th seed Kansas ending their season.

== Preseason ==
The preseason coaches poll was released on October 15. California Baptist was picked to finish ninth in the conference.

=== Preseason rankings ===
Big West Preseason Poll
Place	Team	Points
1	UC Irvine	114 (7)
2	UC San Diego	105 (3)
3	UC Santa Barbara	103 (2)
4	Cal State Northridge	86
5	Utah Valley	85
6	Cal Poly	75
7	Sacramento State	65
8	Cal State Fullerton	49
9	California Baptist	40
10	Cal State Bakersfield	28
11	UC Riverside	23
12	Long Beach State	19
(#) first-place votes

== Roster ==
2026–27 California Baptist Lancers men's basketball team
Players
Coaches

Pos.	#	Name	Height	Weight	Year	Previous school	Hometown
G	0	Jalen Dollar	5 ft 10 in (1.78 m)	165 lb (75 kg)	Jr	Roosevelt High School	Seattle, Washington
G	1	Terry Coner Jr.	6 ft 0 in (1.83 m)	180 lb (82 kg)	Sr	Oklahoma Baptist	Birmingham, Alabama
G	2	Brody Postorino	6 ft 0 in (1.83 m)	195 lb (88 kg)	Fr	St. Mary's High School	Scottsdale, Arizona
G	3	Steven Reynolds III	6 ft 5 in (1.96 m)	185 lb (84 kg)	Fr	Martin High School	South Bend, Indiana
G	4	Daniel Hansen	6 ft 3 in (1.91 m)	195 lb (88 kg)	Fr	Bssm Oberschutzen	Szombathely, Hungary
F	6	Rene D'Amelio	6 ft 9 in (2.06 m)	215 lb (98 kg)	So	Istituto Nasta	Borgomanero, Italy
G	7	Ethan Duncan	6 ft 0 in (1.83 m)	170 lb (77 kg)	RS Sr	Lipscomb	Lubbock, Texas
G	8	Justas Stonkus	6 ft 6 in (1.98 m)	210 lb (95 kg)	RS So	Charleston	Plungė, Lithuania
F	10	Aleksa Milenkovic	6 ft 9 in (2.06 m)	225 lb (102 kg)	Fr	Gimnazija Stefan Nemanja	Belgrade, Serbia
G	11	Jordan Muller	6 ft 0 in (1.83 m)	200 lb (91 kg)	So	Pro Genius Ulm	Neu-Ulm, Germany
F	12	Jonas Zilinskas	6 ft 9 in (2.06 m)	235 lb (107 kg)	Sr	Pro Genius Ulm	Lohr am Main, Germany
F	22	Anton Safin	6 ft 9 in (2.06 m)	225 lb (102 kg)	Fr	Riviera Prep, Miami	London, England
G	24	Odartey Blankson	6 ft 7 in (2.01 m)	210 lb (95 kg)	RS Fr	Acellus Academy	Burbank, California
F	31	Nick Richart	6 ft 10 in (2.08 m)	230 lb (104 kg)	RS Jr	Charlotte	Zionsville, Indiana
C	33	Marko Kovac	7 ft 0 in (2.13 m)	235 lb (107 kg)	Fr	Mater Dei High School	Zagreb, Croatia

Head coach

- Kyle Getter (Hanover)

Assistant coach(es)

- Hardy Asprilla (Cal State Fullerton)
- Doc Wellman (Azusa Pacific)
- Scott Clark (Cal Poly Humboldt)
- Dominic Lippi (Whitman)
- Reginald Howard (UC Riverside)

Legend

- (C) Team captain
- (S) Suspended
- (I) Ineligible
- (W) Walk-on
- Injured
- Current redshirt

Roster
Last update: October 14, 2026

== Schedule and results ==
Date time, TV	Rank^{#}	Opponent^{#}	Result	Record	High points	High rebounds	High assists	Site (attendance) city, state
Regular season
November 3, 2026*; 7:00 p.m., ESPN+		North Florida	L 63–71	0–1	15 – Muller	6 – D'Amelio	3 – Tied	Fowler Events Center (3,742); Riverside, CA
November 6, 2026*; 6:30 p.m., YouTube		at Oregon State	L 68-96	0-2	16 – Coner Jr.	5 – Zilinskas	4 – Coner Jr.	Gill Coliseum (3,120); Corvallis, OR
November 11, 2026*; 7:00 p.m., ESPN+		Chicago State						Fowler Events Center; Riverside, CA
November 13, 2026*; 7:30 p.m., ESPN+		Arkansas–Pine Bluff						Fowler Events Center; Riverside, CA
November 17, 2026*; 7:00 p.m., ESPN+		Seattle						Fowler Events Center; Riverside, CA
November 21, 2026*; 4:00 p.m., FloSports		vs. Loyola Marymount; Acrisure Series Pod 5						Acrisure Arena; Palm Springs, CA
November 22, 2026*; 4:00 p.m., FloSports		vs. Portland; Acrisure Series Pod 5						Acrisure Arena; Palm Springs, CA
December 3, 2026; 7:30 p.m., ESPN+		at UC San Diego						LionTree Arena; San Diego, CA
December 5, 2026; TBA, ESPN+		at UC Riverside						SRC Arena; Riverside, CA
December 9, 2026*; 6:00 p.m., ESPN+		at Utah						Jon M. Huntsman Center; Salt Lake City, UT
December 14, 2026*; 6:00 p.m.		at UC Davis						University Credit Union Center; Davis, CA
December 21, 2026*; 3:00 p.m., BTN		at Prudue						Mackey Arena; West Lafayette, IN
December 31, 2026; 6:00 p.m., ESPN+		UC Santa Barbara						Fowler Events Center; Riverside, CA
January 2, 2027; 5:00 p.m., ESPN+		Cal Poly						Fowler Events Center; Riverside, CA
January 7, 2027; 7:00 p.m., ESPN+		at Cal State Northridge						Premier America Credit Union Arena; Northridge, CA
January 9, 2027; 2:00 p.m., ESPN+		at Cal State Bakersfield						Icardo Center; Bakersfield, CA
January 14, 2027; 7:00 p.m., ESPN+		UC Irvine						Fowler Events Center; Riverside, CA
January 16, 2027; 7:00 p.m., ESPN+		UC San Diego						Fowler Events Center; Riverside, CA
January 21, 2026; 5:00 p.m., ESPN+		at Utah Valley						UCCU Center; Orem, UT
January 23, 2027; 7:00 p.m., ESPN+		at Sacramento State						Hornet Pavilion; Sacramento, CA
January 28, 2027; 7:00 p.m., ESPN+		Long Beach State						Fowler Events Center; Riverside, CA
January 30, 2027; 5:00 p.m., ESPN+		Cal State Fullerton						Fowler Events Center; Riverside, CA
February 4, 2027; 7:00 p.m., ESPN+		Sacramento State						Fowler Events Center; Riverside, CA
February 6, 2027; 5:00 p.m., ESPN+		Utah Valley						Fowler Events Center; Riverside, CA
February 11, 2027; 7:00 p.m., ESPN+		at Cal Poly						Mott Athletics Center; San Luis Obispo, CA
February 13, 2027; 6:00 p.m., ESPN+		at UC Santa Barbara						The Thunderdome; Santa Barbara, CA
February 18, 2026; 7:00 p.m., ESPN+		at UC Irvine						Bren Events Center; Irvine, CA
February 20, 2027; 7:30 p.m., ESPN+		UC Riverside						Fowler Events Center; Riverside, CA
February 25, 2027; 7:00 p.m., ESPN+		Cal State Bakersfield						Fowler Events Center; Riverside, CA
February 27, 2027; 5:00 p.m., ESPN+		Cal State Northridge; Senior Day or Night						Fowler Events Center; Riverside, CA
March 4, 2027; 7:00 p.m., ESPN+		at Cal State Fullerton						Titan Gym; Fullerton, CA
March 6, 2027; 6:00 p.m., ESPN+		at Long Beach State						Walter Pyramid; Long Beach, CA
Big West tournament
March 10, 2027-March 13, 2027; TBD, TBD		vs. TBD						Lee's Family Forum; Henderson, NV
*Non-conference game. ^{#}Rankings from AP Poll. (#) Tournament seedings in parentheses. All times are in Pacific.
