= 2026–27 UC Riverside Highlanders men's basketball team =

American college basketball season

2026–27 UC Riverside Highlanders men's basketball
- Conference: Big West Conference
- Record: 3–1 (0–0 Big West)
- Head coach: Gus Argenal (2nd season)
- Assistant coaches: Tim Bross (2nd season); Blake Wetherington (2nd season); Reuben Williams (2nd season); Matthew Musselman (2nd season); Evan Oliver (1st season)
- Home arena: SRC Arena (Capacity: 3,168)

2026–27 Big West men's basketball standings
	Conf.				Overall
Team	W		L	PCT	W		L	PCT
Cal State Bakersfield	0	–	0	–	4	–	0	1.000
UC Santa Barbara	0	–	0	–	4	–	0	1.000
Utah Valley	0	–	0	–	3	–	0	1.000
UC Irvine	0	–	0	–	3	–	1	.750
UC San Diego	0	–	0	–	3	–	1	.750
UC Riverside	0	–	0	–	3	–	2	.600
Cal State Fullerton	0	–	0	–	2	–	2	.500
Cal Poly	0	–	0	–	2	–	3	.400
Sacramento State	0	–	0	–	1	–	2	.333
Cal State Northridge	0	–	0	–	1	–	3	.250
Long Beach State	0	–	0	–	1	–	3	.250
California Baptist	0	–	0	–	1	–	4	.200
† 2027 Big West tournament winner As of November 19, 2026; Rankings from AP poll

The 2026–27 UC Riverside Highlanders men's basketball team will represent the University of California, Riverside during the 2026–27 NCAA Division I men's basketball season. The Highlanders will be led by second-year head coach Gus Argenal and will play their home games at the SRC Arena in Riverside, California as a member of the Big West Conference.

== Previous season ==
UC Riverside finished the 2025-26 season 5–15, 10–22 in the Big West Conference to finish tenth in the conference. The Highlanders did not qualify for the Big West Tournament.

== Offseason ==
=== Departures ===
UC Riverside Highlanders departures
Name	Number	Pos.	Height	Weight	Year	Hometown	Reason for departure
Tyler Jones	0	G	6'2"	-	Sophomore	Morgan Hill, CA	Transferred to Chico State
EJ Spillman	2	G	6'4"	-	Freshman	Long Beach, CA	Departed program
BJ Kolly	8	F	6'10"	225	Graduate	Everett, WA	Out of eligibility
Osiris Grady	9	F	6'9"	215	Junior	Las Vegas, NV	Transferred to Sacramento State
Marqui Worthy Jr.	10	G	6'4"	216	Junior	Anaheim, CA	Transferred to San Diego
Andrew Henderson	12	G	6'5"	210	Graduate	Los Angeles, CA	Out of eligibility
Denzel Hines	22	F	6'6"	210	Junior	Fontana, CA	Departed program
Dylan Godfrey	23	F	6'8"	205	Junior	Newport Beach, CA	Transferred to Binghamton
Daniel Tobiloba	34	C	7'0"	238	Junior	Lagos, Nigeria	Departed program
Jailen Daniel-Dalton	44	F	6'6"	220	Graduate	Henderson, NV	Out of eligibility

=== Incoming transfers ===
UC Riverside Highlanders incoming transfers
Name	Number	Pos.	Height	Weight	Year	Hometown	Previous School
Tony Duckett	1	G	6'4"	-	Junior	Carlsbad, CA	Saint Mary's
Dallas Washington	3	F	6'10"	-	Sophomore	Redwood City, CA	Long Beach State
James Evans Jr.	5	G	6'6"	-	(redshirt) Sophomore	Wichita, KS	Cal State Northridge
Tyus Parrish-Tillman	8	F	6'8"	-	(redshirt) Senior	Fresno, CA	Biola
Devon Malcolm	12	G	6'5"	-	Graduate	Medford, OR	California Baptist
Abraham Oyeadier	15	C	6'9"	-	(redshirt) Sophomore	Accra, Ghana	West Virginia
Easton Reagan	24	G	6'5"	-	(redshirt) Senior	Scottsdale, AZ	Northwest Nazarene
Aidan Rice	33	G	6'3"	-	Junior	Beaverton, OR	Western Washington

=== 2026 recruiting class ===
College recruiting
Name	Hometown	School	Height	Weight	Commit date
Brayden Harris; SF	Granby, MA	MacDuffie School	6 ft 6 in (1.98 m)	N/A	Feb 6, 2026
Brayden Harris; SF	Recruit ratings: (NR)				
Jacob Majok; PF	Irvine, CA	Crean Lutheran HS	6 ft 8 in (2.03 m)	N/A	Jul 19, 2025
Jacob Majok; PF	Recruit ratings: (NR)				
Overall recruit ranking: Scout: – Rivals: –
Note: In many cases, Scout, Rivals, 247Sports, On3, and ESPN may conflict in their listings of height and weight.; In these cases, the average was taken. ESPN grades are on a 100-point scale.; Sources: "2026 UC Riverside Basketball Recruiting Commits". Scout.; "Scout.com Team Recruiting Rankings". Scout.; "2026 Team Ranking". Rivals.

== Roster ==
2026–27 UC Riverside Highlanders men's basketball team
Players
Coaches

Pos.	#	Name	Height	Weight	Year	Previous school	Hometown
G	0	De'Undrae Perteete Jr.	6 ft 5 in (1.96 m)	—	Jr	Westmont College	Antioch, California
G	1	Tony Duckett	6 ft 4 in (1.93 m)	—	Jr	Saint Mary's	Carlsbad, California
F	3	Dallas Washington	6 ft 10 in (2.08 m)	—	So	Long Beach State	Redwood City, California
G	5	James Evans Jr.	6 ft 6 in (1.98 m)	—	RS So	Cal State Northridge	Wichita, Kansas
G	7	Parker Strauss	6 ft 4 in (1.93 m)	—	RS Jr	Northwestern	Costa Mesa, California
F	8	Tyus Parrish-Tillman	6 ft 8 in (2.03 m)	—	RS Sr	Biola	Fresno, California
G	10	Brayden Harris	6 ft 6 in (1.98 m)	—	Fr	MacDuffie School	San Jose, California
G	12	Devon Malcolm	6 ft 5 in (1.96 m)	—	GS	California Baptist	Medford, Oregon
G	13	Ben Waller	6 ft 6 in (1.98 m)	—	So	Lavalla Catholic College	Traralgon, Australia
C	15	Abraham Oyeadier	6 ft 9 in (2.06 m)	—	RS So	West Virginia	Accra, Ghana
F	23	Jacob Majok	6 ft 7 in (2.01 m)	—	Fr	Crean Lutheran HS	Juba, South Sudan
G	24	Easton Reagan	6 ft 5 in (1.96 m)	—	RS Sr	Northwest Nazarene	Scottsdale, Arizona
F	32	Amaury McKinney	6 ft 6 in (1.98 m)	—	RS Fr	Jesuit HS	Sacramento, California
G	33	Aidan Rice	6 ft 3 in (1.91 m)	—	Jr	Western Washington	Beaverton, Oregon
G	35	Gavin Haase	6 ft 0 in (1.83 m)	—	RS Fr	Palo Alto HS	Palo Alto, California

Head coach

- Gus Argenal (UC Davis)

Assistant coach(es)

- Tim Bross (Gonzaga)
- Blake Wetherington (Murray State)
- Reuben Williams (Willamette)
- Matthew Musselman (San Diego)
- Evan Oliver (Chico State)

Legend

- (C) Team captain
- (S) Suspended
- (I) Ineligible
- (W) Walk-on
- Injured
- Current redshirt

Roster

== Schedule and results ==
Date time, TV	Rank^{#}	Opponent^{#}	Result	Record	High points	High rebounds	High assists	Site (attendance) city, state
Regular season
November 2, 2026*; 7:00 p.m., ESPN+		La Verne	W 110-47	1-0	21 – Duckett	9 – Parrish-Tillman	5 – Rice	SRC Arena (564); Riverside, CA
November 7, 2026*; 4:30 p.m., ESPN+		Denver	W 64-60	2-0	30 – Parrish-Tillman	10 – Parrish-Tillman	5 – Rice	SRC Arena (1,012); Riverside, CA
November 12, 2026*; 7:00 p.m., MW+		at San Jose State	W 80-75	3-0	22 – Duckett	4 – Parrish-Tillman	4 – Washington	Provident Credit Union Event Center (2,871); San Jose, CA
November 14, 2026*; 3:00 p.m., YouTube		at Fresno State	L 80-89	3-1	22 – Waller	10 – Waller	3 – Tied	Save Mart Center (2,783); Fresno, CA
November 18, 2026*; 6:30 p.m., ESPN+		at San Diego	L 62-71	3-2	18 – Duckett	11 – Tied	3 – Tied	Jenny Craig Pavilion (826); San Diego, CA
November 25, 2026*; TBA, ESPN+		Portland State						SRC Arena; Riverside, CA
November 28, 2026*; 2:00 p.m., ESPN+		Lincoln (California)						SRC Arena; Riverside, CA
December 3, 2026; 7:00 p.m., ESPN+		at UC Irvine						Bren Events Center; Irvine, CA
December 5, 2026; TBA, ESPN+		California Baptist; Crosstown Showdown						SRC Arena; Riverside, CA
December 12, 2026*; 12:00 p.m., ACCNX		at California						Haas Pavilion; Berkeley, CA
December 18, 2026*; 5:00 p.m., ESPN+		Utah Tech						SRC Arena; Riverside, CA
December 22, 2026*; 1:00 p.m., ESPN+		at UCLA						Pauley Pavilion; Los Angeles, CA
December 31, 2026; 2:00 p.m., ESPN+		Cal Poly						SRC Arena; Riverside, CA
January 2, 2027; 5:00 p.m., ESPN+		UC Santa Barbara						SRC Arena; Riverside, CA
January 7, 2027; 6:30 p.m., ESPN+		at Cal State Bakersfield						Icardo Center; Bakersfield, CA
January 9, 2027; 5:00 p.m., ESPN+		at Cal State Northridge						Premier America Credit Union Arena; Northridge, CA
January 14, 2027; 7:00 p.m., ESPN+		UC San Diego						SRC Arena; Riverside, CA
January 16, 2027; 5:00 p.m., ESPN+		UC Irvine						SRC Arena; Riverside, CA
January 21, 2027; 7:00 p.m., ESPN+		at Sacramento State						Hornet Pavilion; Sacramento, CA
January 21, 2027; 7:00 p.m., ESPN+		at Utah Valley						UCCU Center; Orem, UT
January 28, 2027; 7:00 p.m., ESPN+		Cal State Fullerton						SRC Arena; Riverside, CA
January 30, 2027; 5:00 p.m., ESPN+		Long Beach State						SRC Arena; Riverside, CA
February 4, 2027; 7:00 p.m., ESPN+		Utah Valley						SRC Arena; Riverside, CA
February 6, 2027; 5:00 p.m., ESPN+		Sacramento State						SRC Arena; Riverside, CA
February 11, 2027; 6:00 p.m., ESPN+		at UC Santa Barbara						The Thunderdome; Santa Barbara, CA
February 13, 2027; 4:00 p.m., ESPN+		at Cal Poly						Mott Athletics Center; San Luis Obispo, CA
February 18, 2027; 7:00 p.m., ESPN+		at UC San Diego						LionTree Arena; La Jolla, CA
February 20, 2027; 7:30 p.m., ESPN+		at California Baptist; Crosstown Showdown						Fowler Events Center; Riverside, CA
February 25, 2027; 7:00 p.m., ESPN+		Cal State Northridge						SRC Arena; Riverside, CA
February 27, 2027; 5:00 p.m., ESPN+		Cal State Bakersfield						SRC Arena; Riverside, CA
March 4, 2027; 7:00 p.m., ESPN+		at Long Beach State						LBS Financial Credit Union Pyramid; Long Beach, CA
March 6, 2027; 4:00 p.m., ESPN+		at Cal State Fullerton						Titan Gym; Fullerton, CA
Big West tournament
March 10, 2027; TBD, TBD		vs. TBD						Lee's Family Forum; Henderson, NV
*Non-conference game. ^{#}Rankings from AP Poll. (#) Tournament seedings in parentheses. All times are in Pacific Time.
