= 2026–27 Sacramento State Hornets men's basketball team =

American college basketball season

2026–27 Sacramento State Hornets men's basketball
- Conference: Big West Conference
- Record: 1–0 (0–0 Big West)
- Head coach: Mike Bibby (2nd season)
- Associate head coach: Michael Bibby (2nd season); Raymond Walcott (2nd season)
- Assistant coaches: Jason Fraser (2nd season); Greg Moody II (4th season); Dr. August Mendes (2nd season)
- Home arena: Hornet Pavilion (Capacity: 3,000)

2026–27 Big West men's basketball standings
	Conf.				Overall
Team	W		L	PCT	W		L	PCT
Cal Poly	0	–	0	–	1	–	0	1.000
Sacramento State	0	–	0	–	1	–	0	1.000
UC Irvine	0	–	0	–	1	–	0	1.000
UC Riverside	0	–	0	–	1	–	0	1.000
UC San Diego	0	–	0	–	1	–	0	1.000
UC Santa Barbara	0	–	0	–	1	–	0	1.000
Utah Valley	0	–	0	–	1	–	0	1.000
Cal State Bakersfield	0	–	0	–	0	–	0	–
California Baptist	0	–	0	–	0	–	1	.000
Cal State Fullerton	0	–	0	–	0	–	1	.000
Cal State Northridge	0	–	0	–	0	–	1	.000
Long Beach State	0	–	0	–	0	–	1	.000
† 2027 Big West tournament winner As of November 6, 2026; Rankings from AP poll

The 2026–27 Sacramento State Hornets men's basketball team will represent the California State University, Sacramento during the 2026–27 NCAA Division I men's basketball season. The Hornets will be led by second-year head coach Mike Bibby and will play their home games at Hornet Pavilion in Sacramento, California as a member of the Big West Conference. This will mark Sacramento State's first season as members of the Big West Conference after spending the previous thirty seasons as members of the Big Sky Conference.

== Previous season ==
Sacramento State finished the 2025-26 season 10–21, 6–12 in the Big Sky Conference to finish eighth in the conference. As the 8-seed in the Big Sky Tournament the Hornets were by defeated by 7-seed Idaho in the First round 45–68 to end their season.

== Offseason ==
=== Departures ===
Sacramento State Hornets departures
Name	Number	Pos.	Height	Weight	Year	Hometown	Reason for departure
Brandon Gardner	0	F	6'8"	215	Sophomore	Waynesboro, GA	Transferred to Norfolk State
Jahni Summers	4	G	6'6"	195	Junior	Evansville, IN	Transferred to South Dakota
Jayden Teat	5	G	6'2"	180	Sophomore	Sacramento, CA	Transferred to Le Moyne
Shaqir O'Neal	8	F	6'8"	200	Senior	Los Angeles, CA	Out of eligibility
Jeremiah Cherry	9	F	6'11"	250	Senior	San Diego, CA	Transferred to San Diego State
Isaiah Bronson	13	G	6'2"	180	Freshman	Gilbert, AZ	Departed program
Prophet Johnson	16	G	6'3"	195	Senior	Dayton, OH	Entered transfer portal
Mark Lavrenov	32	F	6'8"	220	Freshman	Rocklin, CA	Transferred to New Mexico State
Jeremiah Nyarko	34	F	6'9"	215	Senior	Accra, Ghana	Transferred to Vanguard

=== Incoming transfers ===
Sacramento State Hornets incoming transfers
Name	Number	Pos.	Height	Weight	Year	Hometown	Previous School
Larry Hughes II	0	G	6'5"	187	Senior	St. Louis, MO	Cal State Northridge
Mason Hunt	4	F	6'7"	210	Junior	Prescott, AZ	Pima CC
Giannis Asimakopoulos	5	F	6'9"	200	Sophomore	Thessaloniki, Greece	Colby CC
Marcus Wilson	10	G	6'3"	180	Sophomore	Albuquerque, NM	UC Davis
Ridvan Tutic	11	F/C	6'11"	245	Senior	Novi Pazar, Serbia	Stonehill
Osiris Grady	12	F	6'9"	220	Senior	Las Vegas, NV	UC Riverside
Sasa Ciani	22	F	6'10"	240	Senior	Nova Gorica, Slovenia	Penn State
Joao Das Chagas	34	C	6'10"	250	Junior	Niquelândia, Brazil	UAB

=== 2026 recruiting class ===
College recruiting
Name	Hometown	School	Height	Weight	Commit date
Chidi Nwigwe; SF	Oradell, NJ	Wasatch Academy	6 ft 6 in (1.98 m)	190 lb (86 kg)	May 24, 2026
Chidi Nwigwe; SF	Recruit ratings: 247Sports: On3: ESPN: (82)				
Ashton Pierce; CG	Huntersville, NC	North Mecklenburg HS	6 ft 2 in (1.88 m)	165 lb (75 kg)	Oct 25, 2025
Ashton Pierce; CG	Recruit ratings: 247Sports: On3: ESPN: (81)				
Melvin Stubbs Jr. SF	Phoenix, AZ	Sandra Day O'Connor HS	6 ft 4 in (1.93 m)	180 lb (82 kg)	Mar 11, 2026
Melvin Stubbs Jr. SF	Recruit ratings: (NR)				
Overall recruit ranking: Scout: – Rivals: –
Note: In many cases, Scout, Rivals, 247Sports, On3, and ESPN may conflict in their listings of height and weight.; In these cases, the average was taken. ESPN grades are on a 100-point scale.; Sources: "2026 Sacramento State Basketball Recruiting Commits". Scout.; "Scout.com Team Recruiting Rankings". Scout.; "2026 Team Ranking". Rivals.

== Preseason ==
The preseason coaches poll was released on October 15. Sacramento State was picked to finish seventh in the conference.

=== Preseason rankings ===
Big West Preseason Poll
Place	Team	Points
1	UC Irvine	114 (7)
2	UC San Diego	105 (3)
3	UC Santa Barbara	103 (2)
4	Cal State Northridge	86
5	Utah Valley	85
6	Cal Poly	75
7	Sacramento State	65
8	Cal State Fullerton	49
9	California Baptist	40
10	Cal State Bakersfield	28
11	UC Riverside	23
12	Long Beach State	19
(#) first-place votes

== Roster ==
2026–27 Sacramento State Hornets men's basketball team
Players
Coaches

Pos.	#	Name	Height	Weight	Year	Previous school	Hometown
G	0	Larry Hughes II	6 ft 5 in (1.96 m)	187 lb (85 kg)	Sr	Cal State Northridge	St. Louis, Missouri
G	1	Mikey Williams	6 ft 3 in (1.91 m)	203 lb (92 kg)	Jr	UCF	San Diego, California
G	2	Taj Glover	6 ft 3 in (1.91 m)	195 lb (88 kg)	So	South Florida	Atlanta, Georgia
F	3	Zach Anderson	6 ft 3 in (1.91 m)	190 lb (86 kg)	Jr	Scottsdale CC	Scottsdale, Arizona
F	4	Mason Hunt	6 ft 7 in (2.01 m)	210 lb (95 kg)	Jr	Pima CC	Prescott, Arizona
F	5	Giannis Asimakopoulos	6 ft 9 in (2.06 m)	200 lb (91 kg)	So	Colby CC	Thessaloniki, Greece
G	7	Romari Robinson	6 ft 4 in (1.93 m)	195 lb (88 kg)	So	Miami HS	Miami, Florida
G/F	8	Chidi Nwigwe	6 ft 7 in (2.01 m)	210 lb (95 kg)	Fr	Wasatch Academy	Monroe, New York
G	9	Melvin Stubbs Jr.	6 ft 5 in (1.96 m)	180 lb (82 kg)	Fr	Sandra Day O'Connor HS	Tucson, Arizona
G	10	Marcus Wilson	6 ft 3 in (1.91 m)	180 lb (82 kg)	So	UC Davis	Albuquerque, New Mexico
F/C	11	Ridvan Tutic	6 ft 11 in (2.11 m)	245 lb (111 kg)	Sr	Stonehill	Novi Pazar, Serbia
F	12	Osiris Grady	6 ft 9 in (2.06 m)	220 lb (100 kg)	Sr	UC Riverside	Las Vegas, Nevada
F	22	Sasa Ciani	6 ft 10 in (2.08 m)	240 lb (109 kg)	Sr	Penn State	Nova Gorica, Slovenia
G	23	Arman Madi	6 ft 6 in (1.98 m)	210 lb (95 kg)	Jr	Northern Arizona	Scottsdale, Arizona
G	24	Ashton Pierce	6 ft 3 in (1.91 m)	180 lb (82 kg)	Fr	North Mecklenburg HS	Muncie, Indiana
C	34	Joao Das Chagas	6 ft 10 in (2.08 m)	250 lb (113 kg)	Jr	UAB	Niquelândia, Brazil

Head coach

- Mike Bibby (Arizona)

Assistant coach(es)

- Michael Bibby (Appalachian State)
- Raymond Walcott
- Jason Fraser (Villanova)
- Greg Moody II (Mount Olive)
- Dr. August Mendes (Arizona)

Legend

- (C) Team captain
- (S) Suspended
- (I) Ineligible
- (W) Walk-on
- Injured
- Current redshirt

Roster

== Schedule and results ==
Date time, TV	Rank^{#}	Opponent^{#}	Result	Record	High points	High rebounds	High assists	Site (attendance) city, state
Non-confernece regular season
November 2, 2026*; 7:00 p.m., ESPN+		Jessup	W 90–74	1–0	24 – Hughes	11 – Williams	5 – Williams	Hornet Pavilion (2,324); Sacramento, CA
November 7, 2026*; 7:00 p.m., ESPN+		at Santa Clara						Leavey Center; Santa Clara, CA
November 14, 2026*; 5:00 p.m., ESPN+		UC Davis; Causeway Classic						Hornet Pavilion; Sacramento, CA
November 19, 2026*; 7:00 p.m., ACCNX		at Stanford						Maples Pavilion; Stanford, CA
November 28, 2026*; 11:00 a.m., ESPN+		at Presbyterian						Templeton Center; Clinton, SC
December 3, 2026; 7:00 p.m., ESPN+		at Cal State Fullerton						Titan Gym; Fullerton, CA
December 5, 2026; 1:00 p.m., ESPN+		at Utah Valley						UCCU Center; Orem, UT
December 9, 2026*; 7:00 p.m., ESPN+		Bethesda						Hornet Pavilion; Sacramento, CA
December 13, 2026*; 2:00 p.m., ESPN+		Pepperdine						Hornet Pavilion; Sacramento, CA
December 19, 2026*; 1:30 p.m., USA		at Fresno State						Save Mart Center; Fresno, CA
December 22, 2026*; 7:00 p.m., ESPN+		Pacific						Hornet Pavilion; Sacramento, CA
Big West regular season
December 31, 2026; 1:00 p.m., ESPN+		Cal State Northridge						Hornet Pavilion; Sacramento, CA
January 2, 2027; 7:00 p.m., ESPN+		Cal State Bakersfield						Hornet Pavilion; Sacramento, CA
January 7, 2027; 7:00 p.m., ESPN+		at UC Irvine						Bren Events Center; Irvine, CA
January 9, 2027; 6:00 p.m., ESPN+		at UC San Diego						LionTree Arena; La Jolla, CA
January 14, 2027; 7:00 p.m., ESPN+		Cal Poly						Hornet Pavilion; Sacramento, CA
January 16, 2027; 7:00 p.m., ESPN+		UC Santa Barbara						Hornet Pavilion; Sacramento, CA
January 21, 2027; 7:00 p.m., ESPN+		UC Riverside						Hornet Pavilion; Sacramento, CA
January 23, 2027; 7:00 p.m., ESPN+		California Baptist						Hornet Pavilion; Sacramento, CA
January 28, 2027; 8:00 p.m., ESPN+		at Cal State Bakersfield						Icardo Center; Bakersfield, CA
January 30, 2027; 5:00 p.m., ESPN+		at Cal State Northridge						Premier America Credit Union Arena; Northridge, CA
February 4, 2027; 7:00 p.m., ESPN+		at California Baptist						Fowler Events Center; Riverside, CA
February 6, 2027; 5:00 p.m., ESPN+		UC Riverside						SRC Arena; Riverside, CA
February 11, 2027; 7:00 p.m., ESPN+		UC San Diego						Hornet Pavilion; Sacramento, CA
February 13, 2027; 7:00 p.m., ESPN+		UC Irvine						Hornet Pavilion; Sacramento, CA
February 18, 2027; 7:00 p.m., ESPN+		at Long Beach State						LBS Financial Credit Union Pyramid; Long Beach, CA
February 20, 2027; 7:00 p.m., ESPN+		Utah Valley						Hornet Pavilion; Sacramento, CA
February 25, 2027; 7:00 p.m., ESPN+		Cal State Fullerton						Hornet Pavilion; Sacramento, CA
February 27, 2027; 7:00 p.m., ESPN+		Long Beach State						Hornet Pavilion; Sacramento, CA
March 4, 2027; 6:00 p.m., ESPN+		at UC Santa Barbara						The Thunderdome; Santa Barbara, CA
March 6, 2027; 4:00 p.m., ESPN+		at Cal Poly						Mott Athletics Center; San Luis Obispo, CA
Big West tournament
March 10, 2027; TBD, TBD		vs. TBD						Lee's Family Forum; Henderson, NV
*Non-conference game. ^{#}Rankings from AP Poll. (#) Tournament seedings in parentheses. All times are in Pacific Time.
