= 2026–27 UC San Diego Tritons men's basketball team =

American college basketball season

2026–27 UC San Diego Tritons men's basketball
- Conference: Big West Conference
- Record: 2–1 (0–0 Big West)
- Head coach: Clint Allard (2nd season)
- Assistant coaches: Skye Ettin; Rich Shayewitz; Steven Aldridge; Daniel Eberhardt; Denzel Brito
- Home arena: LionTree Arena

2026–27 Big West men's basketball standings
	Conf.				Overall
Team	W		L	PCT	W		L	PCT
Cal State Bakersfield	0	–	0	–	4	–	0	1.000
UC Santa Barbara	0	–	0	–	4	–	0	1.000
Utah Valley	0	–	0	–	3	–	0	1.000
UC Irvine	0	–	0	–	3	–	1	.750
UC Riverside	0	–	0	–	3	–	1	.750
UC San Diego	0	–	0	–	3	–	1	.750
Cal State Fullerton	0	–	0	–	2	–	1	.667
Cal Poly	0	–	0	–	2	–	3	.400
Sacramento State	0	–	0	–	1	–	2	.333
Cal State Northridge	0	–	0	–	1	–	3	.250
Long Beach State	0	–	0	–	1	–	3	.250
California Baptist	0	–	0	–	1	–	4	.200
† 2027 Big West tournament winner As of November 19, 2026; Rankings from AP poll

The 2026–27 UC San Diego Tritons men's basketball team will represent University of California, San Diego in the 2026–27 NCAA Division I men's basketball season. The Tritons are led by 2nd-year head coach Clint Allard and played their home games at LionTree Arena in La Jolla, California as members of the Big West Conference. This is the program's third season eligible for NCAA postseason play after completing its four-year transition to Division I in the 2024–25 season. This will also be the program's final season as full members of the Big West Conference before transitioning to the West Coast Conference.

== Previous season ==
The Tritons finished the 2025–26 season 23–11, 12–8 in Big West play for a three-way tie in third place. They received the No. 5 seed in the Big West Tournament,, where they won over No. 8 Cal Poly in the first round but lost to No. 4 Cal State Northridge in the quarterfinals.

== Offseason ==
=== Departures ===
Departures
Name	Number	Pos.	Height	Weight	Year	Hometown	Reason for departure
Hudson Mayes	0	G	6'5"	200	Freshman	Los Angeles, CA	Transferred to New Mexico
Ryder Elisaldez	1	G	6'3"	175	Sophomore	Las Vegas, NV	Transferred to Biola
Christopher Cox	2	G/F	6'8"	208	RS Freshman	Salt Lake City, UT	Transferred to Westminster
Tyson Dunn	3	G	6'3"	190	Graduate Student	Newmarket, ON	Graduated
Emmanuel Prospere II	5	G/F	6'5"	212	Graduate Student	Miami, FL	Graduated
Bol Dengdit	7	F	6'11"	210	RS Junior	Melbourne, Australia	Transferred to Hawai'i
Trap Johnson	23	G	6'6"	200	RS Freshman	Belton, TX	Transferred to VMI

=== Incoming Transfers ===
Incoming transfers
Name	Number	Pos.	Height	Weight	Year	Hometown	Previous School
Kayde Dotson	0	G	6'1"	190	Junior	Beaumont, TX	Loyola Chicago
Rahmir Barno	1	G	6'0"	151	Senior	Philadelphia, PA	Florida Gulf Coast
Jordan Johnson	3	G	6'3"	205	Junior	Decatur, AL	Calhoun Community College
Camp Wagner	5	G/F	6'6"	190	Senior	Dallas, TX	Indiana State
Olavi Suutela	37	F	6'10"	224	Sophomore	Helsinki, Finland	Oregon State
Treysen Eaglestaff	52	G	6'6"	190	Graduate Student	Bismarck, ND	West Virginia

=== Recruits ===
College recruiting
Name	Hometown	School	Height	Weight	Commit date
Jake Holmes; F	Christchurch, New Zealand	Rangiora HS	6 ft 8 in (2.03 m)	219 lb (99 kg)	
Jake Holmes; F	Recruit ratings: No ratings found				
Overall recruit ranking:
Note: In many cases, Scout, Rivals, 247Sports, On3, and ESPN may conflict in their listings of height and weight.; In these cases, the average was taken. ESPN grades are on a 100-point scale.; Sources:

== Preseason ==
=== Big West Conference Preseason Poll ===
The Big West Conference released its preseason coaches' poll on October 15, 2026. The Tritons were predicted to finish second in the conference with 105 points and 3 first place votes.

Big West Preseason Poll
Place	Team	Points
1	UC Irvine	114 (7)
2	UC San Diego	105 (3)
3	UC Santa Barbara	103 (2)
4	Cal State Northridge	86
5	Utah Valley	85
6	Cal Poly	65
7	Sacramento State	58
8	Cal State Fullerton	49
9	California Baptist	40
10	Cal State Bakersfield	28
11	UC Riverside	23
12	Long Beach State	19
(#) first-place votes

=== Big West Preseason All-Big West Team ===
Senior forward Leo Beath was named to the preseason All-Big West Team.

Player	School
Leo Beath	UC San Diego
Josiah Davis	Cal State Northridge
Larry Hughes II	Sacramento State
Miro Little	UC Santa Barbara
Hamad Mousa	Cal Poly
CJ Shaw	UC Santa Barbara

== Roster ==
2025–26 UC San Diego Tritons men's basketball team
Players
Coaches

Pos.	#	Name	Height	Weight	Year	Previous school	Hometown
G	0	Kayde Dotson	6 ft 1 in (1.85 m)	190 lb (86 kg)	Jr	Loyola Chicago	Beaumont, TX
G	1	Rahmir Barno	6 ft 0 in (1.83 m)	151 lb (68 kg)	Sr	Florida Gulf Coast	Philadelphia, PA
G	2	Jordan Johnson	6 ft 3 in (1.91 m)	205 lb (93 kg)	Jr	Calhoun Community College	Decatur, AL
F	4	Cade Pendleton	6 ft 10 in (2.08 m)	210 lb (95 kg)	Sr	East Hamilton HS	Chattanooga, Tennessee
G/F	5	Camp Wagner	6 ft 6 in (1.98 m)	190 lb (86 kg)	Sr	Indiana State	Dallas, TX
F	8	Leo Beath	6 ft 8 in (2.03 m)	215 lb (98 kg)	Sr	Lynn	Malibu, California
G	9	Tom Beattie	6 ft 5 in (1.96 m)	195 lb (88 kg)	Sr	Hawai'i	Auckland, New Zealand
G	10	Alex Chaikin	6 ft 5 in (1.96 m)	170 lb (77 kg)	Jr	Lafayette	Williamsburg, Virginia
G	11	Jasen Brooks	6 ft 0 in (1.83 m)	195 lb (88 kg)	Jr	Cleveland HS	Cleveland, Tennessee
F	13	Jaden Vance	6 ft 6 in (1.98 m)	180 lb (82 kg)	So	Arizona Compass Prep	Phoenix, Arizona
F	14	Jake Holmes	6 ft 8 in (2.03 m)	219 lb (99 kg)	Fr	Rangiora HS	Christchurch, New Zealand
G	20	Aidan Burke	6 ft 3 in (1.91 m)	190 lb (86 kg)	Sr	Phillips Exeter Academy	Los Gatos, California
G	22	Yaqub Mir	6 ft 2 in (1.88 m)	175 lb (79 kg)	Jr	Granite Bay HS	Granite Bay, California
C	33	Dimitrije Vukicevic	7 ft 0 in (2.13 m)	245 lb (111 kg)	So	Washington State	Belgrade, Serbia
F	37	Olavi Suutela	6 ft 10 in (2.08 m)	224 lb (102 kg)	So	Oregon State	Helsinki, Finland
G	52	Treysen Eaglestaff	6 ft 6 in (1.98 m)	205 lb (93 kg)	GS	West Virginia	Bismarck, ND

Head coach

- Clint Allard (UC San Diego)

Assistant coach(es)

- Skye Ettin (TCNJ)
- Rich Shayewitz (Sonoma State)
- Steven Aldridge (San Diego City)
- Daniel Eberhardt (Cal Maritime)
- Denzel Brito (Loyola Chicago)

Legend

- (C) Team captain
- (S) Suspended
- (I) Ineligible
- (W) Walk-on
- Injured
- Current redshirt

Roster
Last update: October 13, 2026

== Schedule and results ==
Date time, TV	Rank^{#}	Opponent^{#}	Result	Record	High points	High rebounds	High assists	Site (attendance) city, state
Exhibition
October 17, 2026*; 7:00 p.m., ESPN+		USC	L 74-80	–	29 – Eaglestaff	7 – Eaglestaff	2 – Tied	Liontree Arena (4,000); La Jolla, CA
Regular season
November 2, 2026*; 7:00 p.m., ESPN+		Whittier College	W 100–75	1–0	21 – Dotson	7 – Vukicevic	4 – Tied	Liontree Arena (2,183); La Jolla, CA
November 7, 2026*; 7:00 p.m., ESPN+		Fresno State	W 81–65	2–0	24 – Beath	8 – Eaglestaff	4 – Tied	Liontree Arena (3,669); La Jolla, CA
November 13, 2026*; 6:00 p.m., The CW		at Utah State	L 82–120	2–1	16 – Eaglestaff	3 – Tied	5 – Barno	Smith Spectrum (9,518); Logan, UT
November 16, 2026*; 7:00 p.m., ESPN+		Texas Southern	W 97–92	3–1	20 – Suutela	13 – Suutela	4 – Tied	Liontree Arena (1,632); La Jolla, CA
November 22, 2026*; 6:30 p.m.		vs. Seattle; Acrisure Series Pod 4 semifinals						Acrisure Arena; Palm Springs, CA
November 23, 2026*; 6:30 or 9:00 p.m.		vs. San Jose State or Loyola Chicago; Acrisure Series Pod 4						Acrisure Arena; Palm Springs, CA
November 28, 2026*; 7:00 p.m., ESPN+		Loyola Marymount						Liontree Arena; La Jolla, CA
December 3, 2026; 7:30 p.m., ESPN+		California Baptist						Liontree Arena; La Jolla, CA
December 5, 2026; 7:00 p.m., ESPN+		at UC Irvine						Bren Events Center; Irvine, CA
December 12, 2026*; 6:00 p.m., ESPN+		Stanton						Liontree Arena; La Jolla, CA
December 15, 2026*; 5:00 p.m.		at St. Thomas						Lee & Penny Anderson Arena; Saint Paul, MN
December 22, 2026*; 4:30 p.m.		at San Jose State						Provident Credit Union Event Center; San Jose, CA
December 31, 2026; 4:00 p.m., ESPN+		at Cal State Fullerton						Titan Gym; Fullerton, CA
January 2, 2027; 6:00 p.m., ESPN+		at Long Beach State						LBS Financial Credit Union Pyramid; Long Beach, CA
January 7, 2027; 7:00 p.m., ESPN+		Utah Valley						Liontree Arena; La Jolla, CA
January 9, 2027; 6:00 p.m., ESPN+		Sacramento State						Liontree Arena; La Jolla, CA
January 14, 2027; 7:00 p.m., ESPN+		at UC Riverside						SRC Arena; Riverside, CA
January 16, 2027; 5:00 p.m., Spectrum SportsNet		at California Baptist						Fowler Events Center; Riverside, CA
January 21, 2027; 7:00 p.m., ESPN+		Long Beach State						Liontree Arena; La Jolla, CA
January 23, 2027; 6:00 p.m., ESPN+		Cal State Fullerton						Liontree Arena; La Jolla, CA
January 28, 2027; 6:00 p.m., ESPN+		at UC Santa Barbara						The Thunderdome; Santa Barbara, CA
January 30, 2027; 4:00 p.m., ESPN+		at Cal Poly						Mott Athletics Center; San Luis Obispo, CA
February 4, 2027; 7:00 p.m., ESPN+		Cal State Northridge						Liontree Arena; La Jolla, CA
February 6, 2027; 6:00 p.m., ESPN+		Cal State Bakersfield						Liontree Arena; La Jolla, CA
February 11, 2027; 7:00 p.m., ESPN+		at Sacramento State						Hornet Pavilion; Sacramento, CA
February 13, 2027; 1:00 p.m., ESPN+		at Utah Valley						UCCU Center; Orem, UT
February 18, 2027; 7:00 p.m., ESPN+		UC Riverside						Liontree Arena; La Jolla, CA
February 20, 2027; 6:00 p.m., ESPN+		UC Irvine						Liontree Arena; La Jolla, CA
February 25, 2027; 7:00 p.m., ESPN+		Cal Poly						Liontree Arena; La Jolla, CA
February 27, 2027; 6:00 p.m., ESPN+		UC Santa Barbara						Liontree Arena; La Jolla, CA
March 4, 2027; 6:30 p.m., ESPN+		at Cal State Bakersfield						Icardo Center; Bakersfield, CA
March 6, 2027; 5:00 p.m., ESPN+		at Cal State Northridge						Premier America Credit Union Arena; Northridge, CA
Big West tournament
March 10, 2027-March 13, 2027; TBD, TBD		vs. TBD						Lee's Family Forum; Henderson, NV
*Non-conference game. ^{#}Rankings from AP poll. (#) Tournament seedings in parentheses. All times are in Pacific Time.
