= 2026–27 Cal State Fullerton Titans men's basketball team =

American college basketball season

2026–27 Cal State Fullerton Titans men's basketball
- Conference: Big West Conference
- Record: 2–2 (0–0 Big West)
- Head coach: Dedrique Taylor (14th season)
- Assistant coaches: Ryan Hamm (5th season); Truman Moore (1st season); Jabari Trotter (1st season)
- Home arena: Titan Gym (Capacity: 4,000)

2026–27 Big West men's basketball standings
| | Conf. | | | | Overall |
| Team | W | | L | PCT | W | | L | PCT |
|---|---|---|---|---|---|---|---|---|
| Cal State Bakersfield | 0 | – | 0 | – | 4 | – | 0 | 1.000 |
| UC Santa Barbara | 0 | – | 0 | – | 4 | – | 0 | 1.000 |
| Utah Valley | 0 | – | 0 | – | 3 | – | 0 | 1.000 |
| UC Irvine | 0 | – | 0 | – | 3 | – | 1 | .750 |
| UC Riverside | 0 | – | 0 | – | 3 | – | 1 | .750 |
| UC San Diego | 0 | – | 0 | – | 3 | – | 1 | .750 |
| Cal State Fullerton | 0 | – | 0 | – | 2 | – | 2 | .500 |
| Cal Poly | 0 | – | 0 | – | 2 | – | 3 | .400 |
| Sacramento State | 0 | – | 0 | – | 1 | – | 2 | .333 |
| Cal State Northridge | 0 | – | 0 | – | 1 | – | 3 | .250 |
| Long Beach State | 0 | – | 0 | – | 1 | – | 3 | .250 |
| California Baptist | 0 | – | 0 | – | 1 | – | 4 | .200 |
† 2027 Big West tournament winner As of November 19, 2026; Rankings from AP poll

The 2026–27 Cal State Fullerton Titans men's basketball team will represent California State University, Fullerton during the 2026–27 NCAA Division I men's basketball season. The Titans, will be led by 14th-year head coach Dedrique Taylor, and playing their home games at Titan Gym in Fullerton, California as a member of the Big West Conference (BWC).

== Previous season ==
The Titans finished the 2025–26 season 18–16, 12–8 in Big West play to finish in a three-way tie for 2nd place with Cal State Northridge and UC San Diego. As the 3rd seed in the Big West Tournament, as they would lose to 2nd seed Hawaii 78–63 in the Semifinals.

== Preseason ==
The Big West Conference Coaches Poll will be announced in Mid-October.

=== Preseason rankings ===
Big West Preseason Poll
| Place | Team | Points |
|---|---|---|
(#) first-place votes

== Roster ==
2026–27 Cal State Fullerton Titans men's basketball team
Players
Coaches

| Pos. | # | Name | Height | Weight | Year | Previous school | Hometown |
|---|---|---|---|---|---|---|---|
| G | 0 | Anthony Ponga | 6 ft 6 in (1.98 m) | 215 lb (98 kg) | Fr | Fort Erie International Academy | Boucherville, Quebec |
| G | 1 | Davis White | 6 ft 5 in (1.96 m) | 215 lb (98 kg) | Sr | College of the Sequoias | Santa Clarita, California |
| G | 2 | Drew McConnell | 6 ft 1 in (1.85 m) | 185 lb (84 kg) | GS | Cumberlands | Buford, Georgia |
| G | 3 | Marley Zeller | 6 ft 6 in (1.98 m) | 190 lb (86 kg) | Fr | Loyola Marymount | Portland, Oregon |
| G | 7 | Christian Williams | 6 ft 0 in (1.83 m) | 185 lb (84 kg) | So | Vashon High School | St. Louis, Missouri |
| G | 8 | Bailey Nunn | 6 ft 0 in (1.83 m) | 175 lb (79 kg) | Sr | Sacramento State | Melbourne, Australia |
| G | 10 | Greg Howard Jr. | 6 ft 2 in (1.88 m) | 185 lb (84 kg) | Fr | St. Francis School | New Orleans, Louisiana |
| G | 11 | Malcolm Bell | 6 ft 6 in (1.98 m) | 215 lb (98 kg) | Sr | Cal Poly Pomona | Diamond Bar, California |
| G | 12 | Sean Chris Tresvant | 6 ft 1 in (1.85 m) | 180 lb (82 kg) | Jr | Oregon Tech | Portland, Oregon |
| G/F | 13 | Henry Beckett | 6 ft 6 in (1.98 m) | 215 lb (98 kg) | Fr | Long Island Lutheran High School | Dallas, Texas |
| G | 14 | Troy Jenkins | 6 ft 4 in (1.93 m) | 180 lb (82 kg) | RS So | Fresno State | Newport Beach, California |
| G/F | 21 | Matthew Willenborg | 6 ft 8 in (2.03 m) | 215 lb (98 kg) | Sr | Central Oklahoma | Norman, Oklahoma |
| G | 22 | Matthew Quinlan | 6 ft 0 in (1.83 m) | 170 lb (77 kg) | So | Rancho Solano Prep | Phoenix, Arizona |
| F | 23 | Rockwell Reynolds | 6 ft 9 in (2.06 m) | 215 lb (98 kg) | Jr | Citrus College | Rancho Santa Margarita, California |
| F | 24 | Kendrick De Luna | 6 ft 10 in (2.08 m) | 225 lb (102 kg) | Sr | TMI Episcopal | San Antonio, Texas |
| G | 42 | Tiernan Stynes | 6 ft 6 in (1.98 m) | 200 lb (91 kg) | Jr | Quincy | Melbourne, Australia |

Head coach

- Dedrique Taylor (UC Davis)

Assistant coach(es)

- Ryan Hamm (Thomas More)
- Truman Moore (McNeese State)
- Jabari Trotter (Dartmouth)

Legend

- (C) Team captain
- (S) Suspended
- (I) Ineligible
- (W) Walk-on
- Injured
- Current redshirt

Roster
Last update: October 24, 2026

== Schedule and results ==
| Date time, TV | Rank^{#} | Opponent^{#} | Result | Record | High points | High rebounds | High assists | Site (attendance) city, state |
Regular season
| November 3, 2026*; 7:00 p.m., Pac-12 YouTube | | at San Diego State | L 78–102 | 0–1 | 22 – Ward | 7 – Willenborg | 4 – Reynolds | Viejas Arena (10,677); San Diego, California |
| November 7, 2026*; 11:00 a.m., Summit League Network | | at South Dakota | W 87–85 | 1–1 | 22 – Willenborg | 10 – Ward | 8 – Ward | Sanford Coyote Sports Center (1,382); Vermillion, South Dakota |
| November 12, 2026*; 6:00 p.m., ESPN+ | | Lincoln | W 101–71 | 2–1 | 21 – Ward | 9 – Bell | 12 – Ward | Titan Gym (675); Fullerton, California |
| November 18, 2026*; 7:30 p.m., BTN | | at No. 7 UCLA | L 71–75 | 2–2 | 23 – Williams | 7 – Ward | 5 – Ward | Pauley Pavilion (3,353); Los Angeles, California |
| November 22, 2026*; 2:00 p.m., TBD | | at Portland State | | | | | | Viking Pavilion; Portland, Oregon |
| November 28, 2026*; 2:00 p.m., ESPN+ | | Weber State | | | | | | Titan Gym; Fullerton, California |
| December 3, 2026; 7:00 p.m., ESPN+ | | Sacramento State | | | | | | Titan Gym; Fullerton, California |
| December 5, 2026; 4:00 p.m., ESPN+ | | Long Beach State | | | | | | Titan Gym; Fullerton, California |
| December 10, 2026*; 7;00 p.m., TBD | | at Idaho State | | | | | | Reed Gym; Pocatello, Idaho |
| December 12, 2026*; 1:30 p.m., TBD | | at BYU | | | | | | Marriott Center; Provo, Utah |
| December 20, 2026*; 2:00 p.m., ESPN+ | | Utah Tech | | | | | | Titan Gym; Fullerton, California |
| December 22, 2026*; 12:00 p.m., ESPN+ | | Grace (CA) | | | | | | Titan Gym; Fullerton, California |
| December 31, 2026; 2:00 p.m., ESPN+ | | UC San Diego | | | | | | Titan Gym; Fullerton, California |
| January 2, 2027; 4:00 p.m., ESPN+ | | UC Irvine | | | | | | Titan Gym; Fullerton, California |
| January 7, 2027; 6:00 p.m., ESPN+ | | at UC Santa Barbara | | | | | | The Thunderdome; Santa Barbara, California |
| January 9, 2027; 4:00 p.m., ESPN+ | | at Cal Poly | | | | | | Mott Athletics Center; San Luis Obispo, California |
| January 14, 2027; 7:00 p.m., ESPN+ | | Cal State Bakersfield | | | | | | Titan Gym; Fullerton, California |
| January 16, 2027; 4:00 p.m., ESPN+ | | Cal State Northridge | | | | | | Titan Gym; Fullerton, California |
| January 21, 2027; 7:00 p.m., ESPN+ | | at UC Irvine | | | | | | Bren Events Center; Irvine, California |
| January 23, 2027; 6:00 p.m., ESPN+ | | at UC San Diego | | | | | | LionTree Arena; La Jolla, California |
| January 28, 2027; 7:00 p.m., ESPN+ | | at UC Riverside | | | | | | UC Riverside Student Recreation Center; Riverside, California |
| January 30, 2027; 5:00 p.m., ESPN+ | | at California Baptist | | | | | | Fowler Events Center; Riverside, California |
| February 4, 2027; 7:00 p.m., ESPN+ | | Cal Poly | | | | | | Titan Gym; Fullerton, California |
| February 6, 2027; 4:00 p.m., ESPN+ | | UC Santa Barbara | | | | | | Titan Gym; Fullerton, California |
| February 11, 2027; 7:00 p.m., ESPN+ | | at Cal State Northridge | | | | | | Premier America Credit Union Arena; Northridge, California |
| February 13, 2027; 2:00 p.m., ESPN+ | | at Cal State Bakersfield | | | | | | Icardo Center; Bakersfield, California |
| February 18, 2027; 7:00 p.m., ESPN+ | | Utah Valley | | | | | | Titan Gym; Fullerton, California |
| February 20, 2027; 6:00 p.m., ESPN+ | | at Long Beach State | | | | | | LBS Financial Credit Union Pyramid; Long Beach, California |
| February 25, 2027; 7:00 p.m., ESPN+ | | at Sacramento State | | | | | | Hornet Pavilion; Sacramento, California |
| February 27, 2027; 1:00 p.m., ESPN+ | | at Utah Valley | | | | | | UCCU Center; Orem, Utah |
| March 4, 2027; 7:00 p.m., ESPN+ | | California Baptist | | | | | | Titan Gym; Fullerton, California |
| March 6, 2027; 4:00 p.m., ESPN+ | | UC Riverside; Senior Day | | | | | | Titan Gym; Fullerton, California |
Big West tournament
| March 10-13, 2026; TBD, TBD | | vs. TBD; Big West Tournament | | | | | | Lee's Family Forum; Henderson, Nevada |
*Non-conference game. ^{#}Rankings from AP Poll. (#) Tournament seedings in parentheses. All times are in Pacific.

== Game summaries ==
This section will be filled in as the season progresses.

=== Regular season ===
==== at San Diego State ====
Pac-12 YouTube

November 3, 2026
7:00 p.m.

Cal State Fullerton Titans vs. San Diego State Aztecs

Viejas Arena • San Diego, California

==== at South Dakota ====
TBD

Nocember 7, 2026
TBD

Cal State Fullerton Titans vs. South Dakota Coyotes

Sanford Coyote Sports Center • Vermillion, South Dakota

==== Lincoln (CA) ====
ESPN+

November 12, 2026
6:00 p.m.

Lincoln (CA) Oaklanders vs. Cal State Fullerton Titans

Titan Gym • Fullerton, California

==== at UCLA ====
BTN

November 18, 2026
7:30 p.m.

Cal State Fullerton Titans vs. UCLA Bruins

Pauley Pavilion • Los Angeles, California
Attendance: 3,353

==== at Portland State ====
TBD

November 22, 2026
2:00 p.m.

Cal State Fullerton Titans vs. Portland State Vikings

Viking Pavilion • Portland, Oregon

==== Weber State ====
ESPN+

November 28, 2026
2:00 p.m.

Weber State Wildcats vs. Cal State Fullerton Titans

Titan Gym • Fullerton, California

==== Sacramento State ====
ESPN+

December 3, 2026
7:00 p.m.

Sacramento State Hornets vs. Cal State Fullerton Titans

Titan Gym • Fullerton, California

==== Long Beach State ====
ESPN+

December 5, 2026
4:00 p.m.

Long Beach State Beach vs. Cal State Fullerton Titans

Titan Gym • Fullerton, California

==== at Idaho State ====
TBD

December 10, 2026
7:00 p.m.

Cal State Fullerton Titans vs. Idaho State Bengals

Reed Gym • Pocatello, Idaho

==== at BYU ====
TBD

December 12, 2026
TBD p.m.

Cal State Fullerton Titans vs. BYU Cougars

Marriott Center • Provo, Utah

==== Utah Tech ====
ESPN+

December 20, 2026
2:00 p.m.

Utah Tech Trailblazers vs. Cal State Fullerton Titans

Titan Gym • Fullerton, California

==== Grace (CA) ====
ESPN+

December 22, 2026
12:00 p.m.

Grace (CA) Talons vs. Cal State Fullerton Titans

Titan Gym • Fullerton, California
