= 2027 Big West Conference men's basketball tournament =

American college basketball postseason tournament

- Classification: Division I
- Season: 2026–27
- Teams: 8
- Site: Lee's Family Forum; Henderson, Nevada
- Television: ESPN+, ESPNU, ESPN2

2026–27 Big West Conference men's basketball standings
	Conf.				Overall
Team	W		L	PCT	W		L	PCT
Cal State Fullerton	0	–	0	–	0	–	0	–
California Baptist	0	–	0	–	0	–	0	–
Cal Poly	0	–	0	–	0	–	0	–
Cal State Bakersfield	0	–	0	–	0	–	0	–
Cal State Northridge	0	–	0	–	0	–	0	–
Long Beach State	0	–	0	–	0	–	0	–
Sacramento State	0	–	0	–	0	–	0	–
UC Irvine	0	–	0	–	0	–	0	–
UC Riverside	0	–	0	–	0	–	0	–
UC San Diego	0	–	0	–	0	–	0	–
UC Santa Barbara	0	–	0	–	0	–	0	–
Utah Valley	0	–	0	–	0	–	0	–
† 2027 Big West tournament winner Rankings from AP poll

The 2027 Big West Conference men's basketball tournament will be the postseason men's basketball tournament for the Big West Conference of the 2026-27 NCAA Division I men's basketball season. It will be held on March 10-13, 2027, at Lee's Family Forum in Henderson, Nevada. The tournament winner will receive the conference's automatic bid into the NCAA Tournament. This will be the last year that UC San Diego and UC Santa Barbara will compete in the Big West tournament, as they will move to the West Coast Conference following this year.

== Seeds ==
The top eight teams in the conference standings will qualify for the tournament. Teams are seeded by record within the conference, with a tiebreaker system to seed teams with identical conference records. The top two seeds will receive double byes to the semifinals, the third and fourth seeds will receive single byes to the quarterfinals, and the remaining four seeds will play each other in the first round.

Seed	School	Record	Tiebreaker #1	Tiebreaker #2
1				
2				
3				
4				
5				
6				
7				
8				
DNQ				
DNQ				
DNQ				
DNQ				

== Schedule and results ==
Game	Time	Matchup	Score	Television	Attendance
First round – Wednesday, March 10
1					
2					
Quarterfinals – Thursday, March 11
3					
4					
Semifinals – Friday, March 12
5					
6					
Final – Saturday, March 13
7					
*Game times in PDT. Rankings denote tournament seed.

== Bracket ==
First Round; Wednesday, March 11
5
8
6
7

Quarterfinals; Thursday, March 12
4
3

Semifinals; Friday, March 13
1
2

Championship; Saturday, March 14

== See also ==
- 2027 Big West Conference women's basketball tournament
