= Clint Allard =

American college basketball coach (born 1985)

Current position
- Title: Head coach
- Team: UC San Diego
- Conference: Big West
- Record: 26–12 (.684)

Biographical details
- Born: August 12, 1985 (age 41); Santa Maria, California, U.S.
- Education: UC San Diego

Playing career
- 2004–2008: UC San Diego

Coaching career (HC unless noted)
- 2008–2012: UC San Diego (assistant)
- 2012–2014: Cal Poly Pomona (assistant)
- 2014–2025: UC San Diego (associate HC)
- 2025–present: UC San Diego

Head coaching record
- Overall: 26–12 (.684)

Clint Allard (born August 12, 1985) is an American college basketball coach who is the current head coach of the men's basketball program at the University of California, San Diego.

== Playing career ==
Allard grew up in San Jose, California and attended Archbishop Mitty High School. Allard went on to play collegiately at UC San Diego, where he immediately became one of the most prominent players on court. In his final season as a player for the Tritons, he was named to the 2007-08 All-CCAA Second Team, having led the Tritons make their first NCAA DII Championship appearance, advancing to the West Region Quarterfinals.

== Coaching career ==
Allard then remained at UC San Diego as an assistant coach for four seasons before being joining the Cal Poly Pomona Broncos's coaching staff in 2012. In 2014, he returned back to the Tritons as their associate head coach, and helped head coach Eric Olen transform the Tritons to transition from NCAA DII to DI and make a March Madness appearance in the Tritons' first year of eligibility.

Following Olen leaving for the head coach position in New Mexico, Allard was promoted as the new head coach for UC San Diego on March 30, 2025. He is the 13th head coach in Tritons men's basketball program history.

== Head coaching record ==
Record table
Season	Team	Overall	Conference	Standing	Postseason
UC San Diego Tritons (Big West Conference) (2025–present)
2025–26	UC San Diego	23–11	12–8	T–3rd	
2026–27	UC San Diego	3–1	0–0		
UC San Diego:		26–12 (.684)	12–8 (.600)		
Total:		26–12 (.684)			
National champion Postseason invitational champion Conference regular season champion Conference regular season and conference tournament champion Division regular season champion Division regular season and conference tournament champion Conference tournament champion
