= Icardo Center =

Indoor arena in Bakersfield, CA

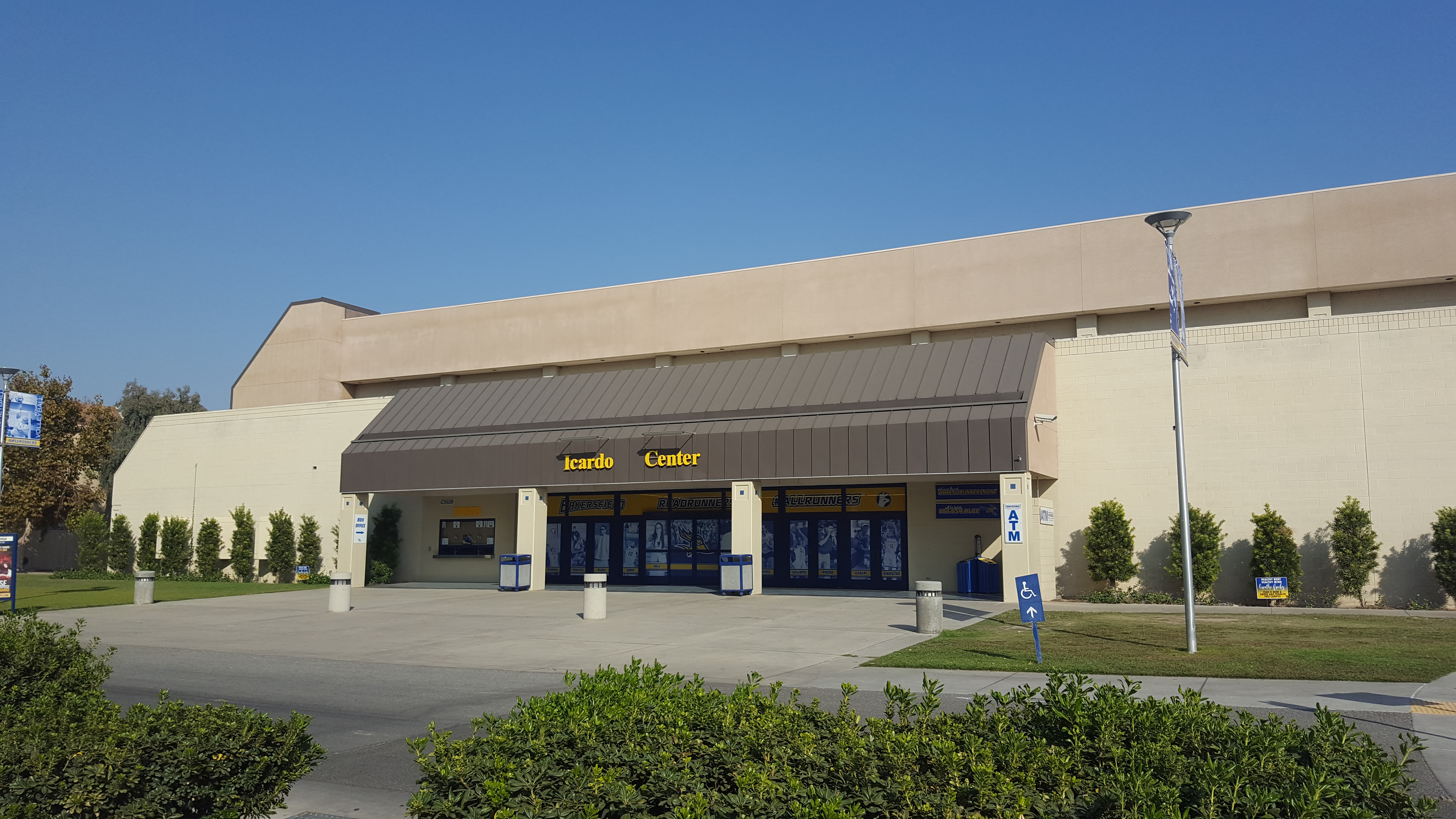
- Interactive map of Icardo Center
- Full name: Jimmie and Marjorie Icardo Center
- Location: Bakersfield, California
- Coordinates: 35°20′51″N 119°6′10″W
- Owner: California State University, Bakersfield
- Operator: California State University, Bakersfield
- Capacity: 3,497

Construction
- Opened: 1989
- Cost: $5 million

Tenants
- Cal State Bakersfield Roadrunners men's basketball (NCAA) (1989–1998, 2014–present); Cal State Bakersfield Roadrunners women's basketball (NCAA) (2000–present); Cal State Bakersfield Roadrunners wrestling (NCAA)

Icardo Center is a 3,497-seat multi-purpose arena in Bakersfield, California. It is home to the Cal State Bakersfield Roadrunners men's basketball, women's basketball, women's volleyball and wrestling teams. From the 1998–99 season through the 2013–14 season, the basketball teams played all or some of their games are in nearby Rabobank Arena, but the teams moved back to campus exclusively starting in the 2014–15 season.

== See also ==
- List of NCAA Division I basketball arenas
