= 2026 National Invitation Tournament =

Men's college basketball tournament

- Season: 2025–26
- Teams: 32
- Finals site: Gainbridge Fieldhouse, Indianapolis, Indiana
- Champions: Auburn (1st title)
- Runner-up: Tulsa (3rd title game)
- Semifinalists: Illinois State (1st semifinal); New Mexico (3rd semifinal)
- Winning coach: Steven Pearl (1st title)
- MVP: Kevin Overton (Auburn)

The 2026 National Invitation Tournament (NIT) was a single-elimination tournament of thirty-two NCAA Division I men's college basketball teams not selected to participate in the 2026 NCAA tournament. The tournament commenced on March 17 and concluded on April 5. The first three rounds were played on campus sites, with the semifinal round played at Hinkle Fieldhouse and the final played at Gainbridge Fieldhouse, both in Indianapolis, Indiana.

St. Thomas made their first ever NCAA Division I men's basketball postseason appearance in the NIT; it was also Seattle's first NIT appearance since 1957 and Navy's first since 1962.

The Auburn University Tigers defeated the University of Tulsa Golden Hurricane, 92–86 in overtime, to claim the championship. The All-Tournament Team was composed of David Green (Tulsa), Keyshawn Hall (Auburn), Kevin Overton (Auburn), Tahaad Pettiford (Auburn) and Tylen Riley (Tulsa); Overton was also selected the Most Outstanding Player.

== Participants ==
Teams and pairings for the 2026 NIT were released by the NIT Committee on March 15, 2026. Thirty-two teams qualified for the NIT, including exempt qualifiers, automatic qualifiers, and at-large selections.

Non-NCAA tournament teams from the Big East, Big Ten and Big 12 conferences are contractually prohibited from playing in any other postseason tournament, including the NIT, if they decline an invitation or remove themselves from consideration for a bid to the College Basketball Crown.

=== Exempt qualifiers ===
For the 2026 NIT, exempt bids were extended to two teams from the Atlantic Coast (ACC) and Southeastern (SEC) conferences, plus one team from each of the top twelve conferences as rated by the Pomeroy College Basketball Ratings (KenPom) on the morning of March 15, 2026. Exempt qualifiers are seeded and guaranteed the opportunity to host a first-round game, subject to venue availability. The KenPom conference ratings used to determine exempt qualifier status were as follows:

Rank	Conference	Pomeroy rating
1	Southeastern Conference	+19.55
2	Big Ten Conference	+18.27
3	Big 12 Conference	+18.21
4	Atlantic Coast Conference	+15.17
5	Big East Conference	+13.53
6	Mountain West Conference	+9.31
7	Atlantic 10 Conference	+4.71
8	West Coast Conference	+4.04
9	Missouri Valley Conference	+3.34
10	American Conference	+1.40
11	Big West Conference	-0.67
12	Western Athletic Conference	-0.80
13	Conference USA	-1.92
14	Ivy League	-2.20
15	Big Sky Conference	-2.29
16	Coastal Athletic Association	-2.55
17	Mid-American Conference	-3.01
18	Southland Conference	-4.14
19	Horizon League	-4.68
20	Sun Belt Conference	-5.87
21	Summit League	-7.10
22	Big South Conference	-7.36
23	Southern Conference	-8.25
24	Atlantic Sun Conference	-8.72
25	Metro Atlantic Athletic Conference	-9.87
26	Ohio Valley Conference	-10.99
27	Patriot League	-11.47
28	Southwestern Athletic Conference	-14.07
29	Northeast Conference	-14.59
30	America East Conference	-16.56
31	Mid-Eastern Athletic Conference	-20.95

The teams accepting exempt bids are shown below. No schools from the Big East or Big Ten accepted invitations. Only two of the ACC's and one of the SEC's three exempt bids were accepted, creating five additional at-large berths.

Team	Conference	Overall record	Seed	Appearance	Last bid
Tulsa	American	26–7 (.788)	1	11th	2015
California	ACC	21–11 (.656)	2	10th	2017
Wake Forest	ACC	17–16 (.515)	1	9th	2024
Dayton	A–10	23–11 (.676)	2	29th	2025
UC Irvine	Big West	23–11 (.676)	4	10th	2025
Oklahoma State	Big 12	19–14 (.576)	2	15th	2025
Illinois State	MVC	20–12 (.625)	4	15th	2017
New Mexico	MWC	23–10 (.697)	1	21st	2023
Auburn	SEC	17–16 (.515)	1	7th	2009
Seattle	WCC	20–13 (.606)	4	3rd	1957
Utah Valley	WAC	25–8 (.758)	4	4th	2025

The final KNIT (average of Bart Torvik "T-Rank" Ranking (BTR), ESPN Basketball Power Index (BPI), Ken Pomeroy Rating (KPR), Kevin Pauga Index (KPI), NCAA Evaluation Tool (NET), Strength of Record (SOR) ranking, and Wins Above Bubble (WAB) ranking) scores of non-NCAA tournament teams from conferences that earned exempt bids through the close of play on March 14, 2026, the morning of (Selection Sunday), are summarized in the tables below. Teams in bold accepted a bid; teams in italics were extended an automatic bid but rejected it. Some Big East, Big Ten, and Big 12 teams were contractually obligated to decline.

Atlantic Coast Conference
Team	KNIT	BTR	BPI	KPR	KPI	NET	SOR	WAB
Virginia Tech	56	53	66	55	48	55	55	59
Stanford	60	59	75	57	44	61	63	61
Florida State	62	50	69	56	64	62	66	67
**California**	66	68	80	74	57	68	57	56
**Wake Forest**	69	67	61	73	68	67	72	78
Syracuse	86	82	78	83	88	86	93	95
Notre Dame	98	97	88	89	100	94	106	112
Pittsburgh	109	102	94	94	107	104	120	141
Boston College	166	139	153	155	181	158	172	207
Georgia Tech	169	160	136	162	184	169	172	200

Southeastern Conference
Team	KNIT	BTR	BPI	KPR	KPI	NET	SOR	WAB
**Auburn**	40	41	28	38	46	38	43	45
Oklahoma	48	40	41	40	67	48	47	53
Ole Miss	75	64	51	65	94	82	78	94
LSU	79	69	53	60	114	78	83	93
Mississippi State	102	98	81	100	119	112	92	111
South Carolina	109	100	92	95	146	108	100	122

American Conference
Team	KNIT	BTR	BPI	KPR	KPI	NET	SOR	WAB
**Tulsa**	62	65	68	63	61	52	62	65
Wichita State	80	84	84	82	71	74	79	83
UAB	118	137	104	128	101	118	113	124
Florida Atlantic	132	123	120	129	128	123	136	162
North Texas	133	141	121	136	122	137	134	143
Memphis	143	133	103	134	142	134	157	197
Temple	171	143	132	165	182	167	193	212
Charlotte	181	172	187	183	169	173	172	211
Tulane	185	201	194	212	141	207	155	182
Rice	222	211	198	226	234	243	193	246
East Carolina	250	259	255	254	244	267	193	280
UTSA	314	336	318	340	320	344	193	347

Atlantic 10 Conference
Team	KNIT	BTR	BPI	KPR	KPI	NET	SOR	WAB
**Dayton**	64	78	64	77	43	69	54	64
George Mason	87	118	85	96	59	92	75	81
Saint Joseph's	103	99	119	118	84	121	87	90
George Washington	104	83	73	85	117	91	130	150
Davidson	112	106	110	114	110	115	110	117
Duquesne	129	121	128	127	115	133	129	148
Rhode Island	146	151	115	135	123	151	156	192
St. Bonaventure	152	154	124	139	127	143	167	208
Richmond	175	168	138	160	175	165	193	227
Fordham	176	177	163	166	187	174	172	193
La Salle	231	216	223	233	209	246	193	295
Loyola Chicago	262	275	241	280	249	278	193	315

Big East Conference
Team	KNIT	BTR	BPI	KPR	KPI	NET	SOR	WAB
Seton Hall	54	60	54	51	60	53	48	50
Creighton	80	85	62	78	85	83	80	89
Butler	81	72	65	87	89	84	82	91
Providence	82	74	59	72	97	81	94	100
Georgetown	86	79	71	80	92	90	90	97
Xavier	97	94	97	97	104	97	91	98
DePaul	101	101	99	102	109	102	95	102
Marquette	102	76	76	84	125	93	116	144

Big Ten Conference
Team	KNIT	BTR	BPI	KPR	KPI	NET	SOR	WAB
Indiana	47	34	38	45	69	41	50	51
Washington	65	52	50	53	90	57	77	79
USC	69	66	67	81	70	79	60	62
Northwestern	74	63	58	58	106	66	84	85
Minnesota	80	58	70	79	98	80	88	88
Oregon	106	90	89	99	118	109	109	125
Maryland	117.6	113	98	120	143	138	101	110
Rutgers	118.0	117	109	124	134	135	99	108
Penn State	137	140	127	138	149	141	125	140

Big West Conference
Team	KNIT	BTR	BPI	KPR	KPI	NET	SOR	WAB
**UC Irvine**	113	108	111	104	102	117	132	119
UC San Diego	124	122	142	117	116	124	131	118
UC Santa Barbara	155	127	147	130	165	142	193	183
Cal State Northridge	172.7	167	195	175	153	188	171	160
UC Davis	172.9	164	205	158	160	178	180	165
Cal State Fullerton	186	193	222	168	157	177	193	189
Cal Poly	227	217	267	211	228	225	193	249
Long Beach State	254	239	278	231	269	257	193	313
UC Riverside	260	248	280	258	264	273	193	306
Cal State Bakersfield	308	324	329	326	315	330	193	342

Big 12 Conference
Team	KNIT	BTR	BPI	KPR	KPI	NET	SOR	WAB
Cincinnati	52	32	43	44	56	49	68	70
Baylor	58	47	45	48	76	50	70	72
West Virginia	61	62	47	59	65	59	69	68
**Oklahoma State**	64	75	74	66	47	75	53	58
Arizona State	67	61	90	67	58	73	59	63
Colorado	76	77	91	70	72	77	73	75
Kansas State	106	103	87	101	112	100	107	132
Utah	136	115	107	126	145	132	151	175

Missouri Valley Conference
Team	KNIT	BTR	BPI	KPR	KPI	NET	SOR	WAB
Belmont	67	81	96	69	45	63	61	55
**Illinois State**	103	110	100	103	86	95	115	115
Murray State	114	135	123	122	93	105	108	109
Bradley	117	134	116	123	95	113	119	120
UIC	127	111	117	105	120	110	153	171
Southern Illinois	143	129	126	116	126	120	188	195
Valparaiso	161	163	177	157	162	156	150	161
Drake	207	215	184	197	189	199	193	274
Indiana State	223	205	215	201	242	213	193	291
Evansville	288	302	307	308	260	306	193	339

Mountain West Conference
Team	KNIT	BTR	BPI	KPR	KPI	NET	SOR	WAB
San Diego State	48	44	56	47	40	47	56	47
**New Mexico**	53	54	55	50	49	46	64	52
Boise State	65	56	79	61	55	60	74	71
Grand Canyon	72	55	72	62	75	71	85	82
Nevada	74	80	83	75	62	70	76	69
Colorado State	84	88	86	86	74	87	89	80
Wyoming	105	95	118	98	103	99	114	106
UNLV	108	109	105	108	82	111	118	121
Fresno State	165	131	155	132	176	153	193	213
San Jose State	231	214	233	225	224	244	193	282
Air Force	320	343	355	345	297	350	193	356

West Coast Conference
Team	KNIT	BTR	BPI	KPR	KPI	NET	SOR	WAB
**Seattle**	120	104	129	119	139	122	121	107
Pacific	127.6	107	130	112	154	116	140	134
San Francisco	128.1	124	106	121	152	119	138	137
Oregon State	158	162	171	177	130	170	147	147
Washington State	171	125	164	137	202	145	193	230
Loyola Marymount	178	147	149	161	206	179	193	210
Portland	214	188	272	202	203	222	193	217
San Diego	233	213	234	224	261	234	193	271
Pepperdine	265	254	287	264	284	274	193	301

Western Athletic Conference
Team	KNIT	BTR	BPI	KPR	KPI	NET	SOR	WAB
**Utah Valley**	89	87	113	90	78	85	96	76
UT Arlington	168	182	197	153	147	161	182	156
Utah Tech	182	183	238	188	151	176	182	157
Tarleton	229	225	269	221	220	230	193	242
Abilene Christian	242	255	274	242	230	248	193	255
Southern Utah	263	262	293	251	256	272	193	312

=== Automatic qualifiers ===
Automatic bids are given to regular-season conference champions with an average ranking (or "KNIT" score) of 125 or better across the BTR, BPI, KPR, KPI, NET, SOR and WAB rankings.

The final KNIT scores through the close of play on March 14, 2026 (the morning of Selection Sunday), of teams that were conference regular-season champions, failed to win their conference tournament and are not from conferences receiving an exempt bid are summarized in the table below.

Team	Conference	KNIT	BTR	BPI	KPR	KPI	NET	SOR	WAB
Central Arkansas	ASUN	157	144	190	151	178	166	137	131
Portland State	Big Sky	160	158	192	146	205	146	149	127
UNC Wilmington	CAA	**97**	126	108	110	80	96	81	77
Liberty	CUSA	**96**	120	101	125	73	106	71	73
Yale	Ivy	**71**	91	95	76	54	65	58	57
Merrimack	MAAC	156	170	188	179	111	180	133	129
Miami (OH) (Note: Miami (OH) was awarded an at-large bid to the NCAA tournament and, therefore, does not have an automatic bid for the NIT.)	MAC	**64**	86	93	93	53	64	25	34
Navy	Patriot	136	148	141	142	190	136	103	92
East Tennessee State	SoCon	155	196	143	167	148	139	144	145
Stephen F. Austin	Southland	**88**	89	114	91	105	89	65	60
Bethune–Cookman	SWAC	227	224	246	243	253	261	193	167

Teams qualifying for and accepting automatic bids were as follows:

Team	Conference	Overall record	Seed	Appearance	Last bid
Liberty	CUSA	25–7 (.781)	–	2nd	2023
Stephen F. Austin	Southland	28–5 (.848)	–	4th	2013
UNC Wilmington	CAA	26–6 (.813)	–	3rd	2001
Yale	Ivy	24–6 (.800)	3	3rd	2023

=== At-large bids ===
After eleven of the sixteen available exempt bids were accepted, and four teams qualified for and accepted automatic bids, seventeen at-large bids were available to fill the 32-team field. The following teams accepted at-large bids.

Team	Conference	Overall record	Seed	Appearance	Last bid
Bradley	MVC	21–12 (.636)	–	25th	2025
Colorado State	MWC	21–12 (.636)	3	11th	2021
Davidson	Atlantic 10	20–13 (.606)	–	10th	2021
George Mason	Atlantic 10	23–9 (.719)	3	6th	2025
George Washington	Atlantic 10	18–15 (.545)	–	7th	2016
Kent State	MAC	24–9 (.727)	–	11th	2025
Murray State	MVC	20–12 (.625)	–	9th	2015
Navy	Patriot	26–7 (.788)	–	2nd	1962
Nevada	MWC	22–12 (.647)	2	6th	2012
Saint Joseph's	Atlantic 10	22–11 (.667)	–	19th	2025
Sam Houston	CUSA	22–11 (.667)	–	3rd	2023
South Alabama	Sun Belt	21–11 (.656)	–	5th	2007
St. Thomas	Summit	24–9 (.727)	–	1st	–
UIC	MVC	19–15 (.559)	–	2nd	2003
UNLV	MWC	17–16 (.515)	–	12th	2024
Wichita State	American	22–11 (.667)	3	15th	2025
Wyoming	MWC	18–14 (.563)	–	9th	2003

=== Declined bids ===
==== Teams contractually obligated to decline ====
Teams from the Big East, Big Ten and Big 12 conferences that either preemptively declined an opportunity or were offered a bid to play in the 2026 College Basketball Crown were contractually forbidden from participating in the NIT.

- Baylor †
- Butler
- Cincinnati
- Creighton †
- DePaul
- Georgetown
- Indiana
- Marquette
- Minnesota †
- Northwestern
- Oklahoma †
- Oregon
- Providence
- Rutgers †
- Seton Hall
- Stanford †
- USC
- Washington
- West Virginia †
- Xavier

† Participating in 2026 College Basketball Crown.

==== Other teams declined ====
- Belmont
- Florida State
- San Diego State
- Virginia Tech

== Bracket ==
As only 11 exempt qualifiers accepted bids, five automatic/at-large teams were additionally seeded to complete the 32-team bracket. Nevada was awarded a number two seed, while Colorado State, George Mason, Wichita State and Yale were assigned number three seeds.

=== Auburn Region ===
First round March 17–18; Campus sites
1	Auburn	78
South Alabama	67
4	Seattle	67
St. Thomas (MN)	52
2	Nevada	89
Murray State	75
3	George Mason	71
Liberty	77

Second round March 21–22; Campus sites
1	Auburn	91
4	Seattle	85
2	Nevada	73
Liberty	63

Quarterfinal; March 25; Campus site
1	Auburn	75
2	Nevada	69

=== Winston-Salem Region ===
First round March 17–18; Campus sites
1	Wake Forest	82
Navy	72
4	Illinois State	79
Kent State	58
2	Dayton (Note: Dayton traveled to Peoria, Illinois to play an away game due to the NCAA Division I Men's Basketball Tournament First Four taking place at UD Arena.)	80
Bradley	66
3	Yale	67
UNC Wilmington	68

Second round March 21–22; Campus sites
1	Wake Forest	75
4	Illinois State	78
2	Dayton (Note: Dayton traveled to Wilmington, North Carolina to play an away game due to the OHSAA Boys Basketball State Championships taking place at UD Arena.)	80
UNC Wilmington	61

Quarterfinal; March 25; Campus site
4	Illinois State	61
2	Dayton	55

=== Albuquerque Region ===
First round March 18; Campus sites
1	New Mexico	107
Sam Houston	83
4	Utah Valley	78
George Washington	79
2	California	91
UIC	73
3	Colorado State	64
Saint Joseph's	69

Second round March 22; Campus sites
1	New Mexico	86
George Washington	61
2	California	75
Saint Joseph's	76

Quarterfinal; March 24; Campus site
1	New Mexico	84
Saint Joseph's	69

=== Tulsa Region ===
First round March 17; Campus sites
1	Tulsa	89
Stephen F. Austin	84 OT
4	UC Irvine	72
UNLV	75
2	Oklahoma State	84
Davidson	80
3	Wichita State	74
Wyoming	70

Second round March 22; Campus sites
1	Tulsa	77
UNLV	66
2	Oklahoma State	70
3	Wichita State	96

Quarterfinal; March 24; Campus site
1	Tulsa	83
3	Wichita State	79

=== Semifinals and Final ===
Semifinal; April 2 Hinkle Fieldhouse
1	Auburn	88
4	Illinois State	66
1	New Mexico	69
1	Tulsa	74

Final; April 5 Gainbridge Fieldhouse
1	Auburn	92
1	Tulsa	86 OT

== Game summaries ==
All times are in Eastern Daylight Time (UTC-4)

=== First round ===
ESPN2

March 17
6:00 p.m. EDT

Box Score

No. 3 George Mason 71, Liberty 77
Scoring by half: 24–34, 47–43
Pts: 27 – Long; Rebs: 9 – Mincy; Asts: 4 – Long	Pts: 23 – Smith; Rebs: 9 – Smith; Asts: 7 – Cleveland
Auburn Region Quarterfinal

EagleBank Arena
Fairfax, Virginia
Attendance: 1,485
Referees: Luckie, Sassano, Switzer

ESPN+

March 17
7:00 p.m.

Box Score

No. 3 Yale 67, UNC Wilmington 68
Scoring by half: 32–26, 35–42
Pts: 23 – Celiscar; Rebs: 12 – Celiscar; Asts: 5 – Tied (2)	Pts: 16 – May; Rebs: 9 – Wessler; Asts: 4 – Tied (2)
Winston-Salem Region Quarterfinal

John J. Lee Amphitheater
New Haven, Connecticut
Attendance: 542
Referees: Evans, Fleury, Mallios

ESPNU

March 17
7:00 p.m.

Box Score

No. 3 Wichita State 74, Wyoming 70
Scoring by half: 28–24, 46–46
Pts: 17 – Williams; Rebs: 14 – Williams; Asts: 5 – Gray Jr.	Pts: 17 – Dennis; Rebs: 7 – Meyer; Asts: 6 – Walker
Tulsa Region Quarterfinal

Charles Koch Arena
Wichita, Kansas
Attendance: 3,733
Referees: Jarman, Orkus Jr., Swoboda

ESPN2

March 17
8:00 p.m.

Box Score

No. 2 Oklahoma State 84, Davidson 80
Scoring by half: 40–50, 44–30
Pts: 20 – Clary; Rebs: 13 – Coleman; Asts: 4 – Crotty	Pts: 22 – Blums; Rebs: 6 – Scovens; Asts: 5 – Tied (2)
Tulsa Region Quarterfinal

Gallagher-Iba Arena
Stillwater, Oklahoma
Attendance: 1,581
Referees: Campbell, Felder, Jeffres

ESPNU

March 17
9:00 p.m.

Box Score

No. 1 Tulsa 89, Stephen F. Austin 84 (OT)
Scoring by half: 36–39, 40–37 Overtime: 13–8
Pts: 24 – Lawal; Rebs: 12 – Behrend; Asts: 3 – Riley	Pts: 27 – Thompson; Rebs: 7 – Tied (2); Asts: 5 – Tied (2)
Tulsa Region Quarterfinal

Donald W. Reynolds Center
Tulsa, Oklahoma
Attendance: 1,679
Referees: Deering, Seales, Wallace

ESPN2

March 17
10:00 p.m.

Box Score

No. 1 Auburn 78, South Alabama 67
Scoring by half: 30–36, 48–31
Pts: 21 – Tied (2); Rebs: 10 – Freeman; Asts: 4 – Tied (3)	Pts: 29 – Harris; Rebs: 9 – Williams; Asts: 6 – Harris
Auburn Region Quarterfinal

Neville Arena
Auburn, Alabama
Attendance: 2,169
Referees: Allen, Cybrum, Ford

ESPN+

March 17
10:00 p.m.

Box Score

No. 4 Seattle 67, St. Thomas (MN) 52
Scoring by half: 30–31, 37–21
Pts: 14 – Maldonado; Rebs: 9 – Arington; Asts: 5 – Maldonado	Pts: 15 – Minessale; Rebs: 9 – Oosterbaan; Asts: 4 – Minessale
Auburn Region Quarterfinal

Redhawk Center
Seattle, Washington
Attendance: 686
Referees: Ames, Fulton, Shamion

ESPNU

March 17
11:00 p.m.

Box Score

No. 4 UC Irvine 72, UNLV 75
Scoring by half: 24–37, 48–38
Pts: 18 – Saran; Rebs: 13 – Evans; Asts: 6 – Saran	Pts: 14 – Hamilton; Rebs: 9 – Fleming Jr. Asts: 4 – Tied (2)
Tulsa Region Quarterfinal

Bren Events Center
Irvine, California
Attendance: 1,113
Referees: Barney, Harvey III, Mojica

ESPNU

March 18
7:00 p.m.

Box Score

No. 1 Wake Forest 82, Navy 72
Scoring by half: 38–34, 44–38
Pts: 26 – Harris; Rebs: 9 – Spillers; Asts: 3 – Tied (3)	Pts: 19 – Benigni; Rebs: 10 – Kehoe; Asts: 4 – Benigni
Winston-Salem Region Quarterfinal

Lawrence Joel Veterans Memorial Coliseum
Winston-Salem, North Carolina
Attendance: 1,823
Referees: Heater, Styons, Wells

ESPN+

March 18
8:00 p.m.

Box Score

No. 4 Utah Valley 78, George Washington 79
Scoring by half: 29–45, 49–34
Pts: 27 – Holcombe; Rebs: 7 – Davis; Asts: 7 – Holcombe	Pts: 22 – Castro; Rebs: 11 – Castro; Asts: 6 – Jones
Albuquerque Region Quarterfinal

UCCU Center
Orem, Utah
Attendance: 1,582
Referees: Dean, Kidwai, St. Clair

ESPN+

March 18
8:00 p.m.

Box Score

No. 4 Illinois State 79, Kent State 58
Scoring by half: 45–25, 34–33
Pts: 24 – Wolf; Rebs: 7 – Tied (2); Asts: 7 – Kinziger	Pts: 19 – Safford; Rebs: 15 – Gillespie; Asts: 4 – Medley
Winston-Salem Region Quarterfinal

CEFCU Arena
Normal, Illinois
Attendance: 2,565
Referees: Ford, Grimshaw, Hudson

ESPN+

March 18
9:00 p.m.

Box Score

No. 1 New Mexico 107, Sam Houston 83
Scoring by half: 51–39, 56–44
Pts: 22 – Buljan; Rebs: 10 – Buljan; Asts: 6 – Tied (2)	Pts: 22 – Beaumont; Rebs: 10 – Ilic; Asts: 6 – Walker
Albuquerque Region Quarterfinal

The Pit
Albuquerque, New Mexico
Attendance: 7,286
Referees: Hogan, Nunez, Schumer

ESPNU

March 18
9:00 p.m.

Box Score

Bradley 66, No. 2 Dayton 80
Scoring by half: 30–47, 36–33
Pts: 19 – Huibregtse; Rebs: 8 – Smith; Asts: 4 – Wheeler	Pts: 25 – Bennett; Rebs: 8 – L'Etang; Asts: 5 – Derkack
Winston-Salem Region Quarterfinal

Carver Arena
Peoria, Illinois
Attendance: 2,436
Referees: Albrecht, Duke, Rukasin

ESPN+

March 18
10:00 p.m.

Box Score

No. 2 Nevada 89, Murray State 75
Scoring by half: 41–39, 48–36
Pts: 23 – Weems; Rebs: 13 – Price; Asts: 5 – Camper Jr.	Pts: 17 – Domon; Rebs: 11 – King; Asts: 7 – Jackson
Auburn Region Quarterfinal

Lawlor Events Center
Reno, Nevada
Attendance: 5,588
Referees: Caldwell, Gelinas, Kueneman

ESPN2

March 18
11:00 p.m.

Box Score

No. 2 California 91, UIC 73
Scoring by half: 39–35, 52–38
Pts: 31 – Bell; Rebs: 7 – Ilic; Asts: 7 – Carr	Pts: 15 – Washington Jr. Rebs: 6 – Lowery; Asts: 12 – Crawford
Albuquerque Region Quarterfinal

Haas Pavilion
Berkeley, California
Attendance: 1,258
Referees: Ames, Fulton, Shamion

ESPNU

March 18
11:00 p.m.

Box Score

No. 3 Colorado State 64, Saint Joseph's 69
Scoring by half: 28–33, 36–36
Pts: 14 – Muniz; Rebs: 9 – Jorgensen; Asts: 5 – Muniz	Pts: 13 – Tied (3); Rebs: 9 – Simpson; Asts: 3 – Tied (2)
Albuquerque Region Quarterfinal

Moby Arena
Fort Collins, Colorado
Attendance: 1,332
Referees: Corner, Floyd, Raher

=== Second round ===
ESPN+

March 21
7:00 p.m. EDT

Box Score

UNC Wilmington 61, No. 2 Dayton 80
Scoring by half: 33–37, 28–43
Pts: 12 – Wessler; Rebs: 7 – Wessler; Asts: 2 – Tied (2)	Pts: 20 – Montgomery; Rebs: 13 – Derkack; Asts: 4 – Bennett
Winston-Salem Region Semifinal

Trask Coliseum
Wilmington, North Carolina
Attendance: 5,038
Referees: Crisp, Heater, Sassano

ESPN+

March 21
9:00 p.m.

Box Score

No. 2 Nevada 73, Liberty 63
Scoring by half: 35–31, 38–32
Pts: 15 – Price; Rebs: 13 – Camper Jr. Asts: 10 – Camper Jr.	Pts: 20 – Decker Jr. Rebs: 7 – Cleveland; Asts: 6 – Cleveland
Auburn Region Semifinal

Lawlor Events Center
Reno, Nevada
Attendance: 4,616
Referees: Nunez, Schumer, Siler

ESPN2

March 22
4:30 p.m.

Box Score

No. 1 Wake Forest 75, No. 4 Illinois State 78
Scoring by half: 32–32, 43–46
Pts: 24 – Spillers; Rebs: 8 – Harris; Asts: 5 – Calmese	Pts: 23 – Pence; Rebs: 9 – Skunberg; Asts: 5 – Kinziger
Winston-Salem Region Semifinal

Lawrence Joel Veterans Memorial Coliseum
Winston-Salem, North Carolina
Attendance: 1,933
Referees: Eades, Pon, Shaw

ESPN2

March 22
6:30 p.m.

Box Score

No. 1 Auburn 91, No. 4 Seattle 85
Scoring by half: 42–31, 49–54
Pts: 23 – Overton; Rebs: 15 – Hall; Asts: 5 – Hall	Pts: 26 – Maldonado; Rebs: 6 – Yeo; Asts: 5 – Maldonado
Auburn Region Semifinal

Neville Arena
Auburn, Alabama
Attendance: 3,672
Referees: Brandes, Land, Lewis

ESPNU

March 22
7:00 p.m.

Box Score

No. 1 Tulsa 77, UNLV 66
Scoring by half: 36–24, 41–42
Pts: 16 – Tied (2); Rebs: 10 – Dean; Asts: 6 – Riley	Pts: 29 – Gibbs-Lawhorn; Rebs: 8 – Jones; Asts: 7 – Jones
Tulsa Region Semifinal

Donald W. Reynolds Center
Tulsa, Oklahoma
Attendance: 2,432
Referees: McCoy, Page, Shannon

ESPN+

March 22
8:00 p.m.

Box Score

No. 1 New Mexico 86, George Washington 61
Scoring by half: 36–32, 50–29
Pts: 19 – Hall; Rebs: 9 – Buljan; Asts: 6 – Tied (2)	Pts: 16 – Jones; Rebs: 14 – Castro; Asts: 3 – Castro
Albuquerque Region Semifinal

The Pit
Albuquerque, New Mexico
Attendance: 9,207
Referees: Comer, Kueneman, Love

ESPN2

March 22
8:30 p.m.

Box Score

No. 2 Oklahoma State 70, No. 3 Wichita State 96
Scoring by half: 37–44, 33–52
Pts: 22 – Coleman; Rebs: 10 – Coleman; Asts: 3 – Miller	Pts: 28 – Giles; Rebs: 10 – Tied (2); Asts: 4 – Kindell
Tulsa Region Semifinal

Gallagher-Iba Arena
Stillwater, Oklahoma
Attendance: 2,526
Referees: Hirz, Larson, Thompson

ESPNU

March 22
9:00 p.m.

Box Score

No. 2 California 75, Saint Joseph's 76
Scoring by half: 41–33, 34–43
Pts: 23 – Bell; Rebs: 8 – Dort; Asts: 6 – Pippen	Pts: 24 – Glover-Toscano; Rebs: 11 – Haskins; Asts: 7 – Simpson
Albuquerque Region Semifinal

Haas Pavilion
Berkeley, California
Attendance: 1,657
Referees: Dean, Garretson, White

=== Quarterfinal round ===
ESPN2

March 24
7:00 p.m. EDT

Box Score

No. 1 Tulsa 83, No. 3 Wichita State 79
Scoring by half: 52–36, 31–43
Pts: 24 – Barnstable; Rebs: 6 – Tied (2); Asts: 6 – Riley	Pts: 19 – Williams; Rebs: 8 – Tied (2); Asts: 3 – Gray Jr.
Tulsa Region Final

Donald W. Reynolds Center
Tulsa, Oklahoma
Attendance: 3,198
Referees: Baker, Howard, Santos

ESPN2

March 24
9:00 p.m.

Box Score

No. 1 New Mexico 84, Saint Joseph's 69
Scoring by half: 37–39, 47–30
Pts: 27 – Buljan; Rebs: 11 – Buljan; Asts: 5 – Haupt	Pts: 26 – Simpson; Rebs: 8 – Myers; Asts: 5 – Tied (2)
Albuquerque Region Final

The Pit
Albuquerque, New Mexico
Attendance: 8,054
Referees: Harris, Littlewood, Rukasin

ESPN2

March 25
7:00 p.m.

Box Score

No. 2 Dayton 55, No. 4 Illinois State 61
Scoring by half: 23–33, 32–28
Pts: 12 – Heard; Rebs: 6 – Tied (3); Asts: 2 – Tied (2)	Pts: 16 – Kinziger; Rebs: 10 – Walker; Asts: 4 – Skunberg
Winston-Salem Region Final

University of Dayton Arena
Dayton, Ohio
Attendance: 10,444
Referees: Kitts, Miliner, Smith

ESPN2

March 25
9:00 p.m.

Box Score

No. 1 Auburn 75, No. 2 Nevada 69
Scoring by half: 38–26, 37–43
Pts: 18 – Jović; Rebs: 9 – Jović; Asts: 6 – Pettiford	Pts: 22 – Price; Rebs: 11 – Price; Asts: 6 – Comer
Auburn Region Final

Neville Arena
Auburn, Alabama
Attendance: 2,756
Referees: Nieves, Ramnanan, Rorke

=== Semifinal round ===
ESPN

April 2
7:00 p.m. EDT

Box Score

No. 1 New Mexico 69, No. 1 Tulsa 74
Scoring by half: 29–36, 40–38
Pts: 20 – Hall; Rebs: 7 – Tied (2); Asts: 3 – Buljan	Pts: 13 – Green; Rebs: 8 – Behrend; Asts: 5 – Riley
Albuquerque Region vs. Tulsa Region

Hinkle Fieldhouse
Indianapolis, Indiana
Attendance: 4,625
Referees: Morrissey, Voyard-Tadal, Young

ESPN

April 2
9:30 p.m.

Box Score

No. 1 Auburn 88, No. 4 Illinois State 66
Scoring by half: 51–38, 37–28
Pts: 24 – Hall; Rebs: 6 – Hall; Asts: 5 – Pettiford	Pts: 17 – Coleman; Rebs: 7 – Walker; Asts: 4 – Skunberg
Auburn Region vs. Winston-Salem Region

Hinkle Fieldhouse
Indianapolis, Indiana
Attendance: 4,625
Referees: Austin, Covington Jr., Smith

=== Final round ===
ESPN2

April 5
8:00 p.m. EDT

Box Score

No. 1 Auburn 92, No. 1 Tulsa 86 (OT)
Scoring by half: 48–31, 30–47 Overtime: 14–8
Pts: 26 – Overton; Rebs: 14 – Freeman; Asts: 8 – Pettiford	Pts: 25 – Green; Rebs: 6 – Tied (3); Asts: 3 – Riley
Championship

Gainbridge Fieldhouse
Indianapolis, Indiana
Attendance: 9,670
Referees: Lenox, Richardson, Wells

== Media ==
ESPN, Inc. has exclusive rights to all of the NIT games. It telecasts every game across ESPN, ESPN2, ESPNU, and ESPN+. Westwood One has exclusive radio rights to both the semifinal and final rounds.

== See also ==
- 2026 NCAA Division I men's basketball tournament
- 2026 College Basketball Crown
