= List of New Mexico Lobos men's basketball head coaches =

The following is a list of New Mexico Lobos men's basketball head coaches. There have been 23 head coaches of the Lobos in program history.

New Mexico's current head coach is Eric Olen. He was hired as the Lobos' head coach in March 2025, replacing Richard Pitino, who left to assume the head coaching vacancy at Xavier University after the 2024-25 season.

| No. | Tenure | Coach | Years | Record | Pct. |
|---|---|---|---|---|---|
| – | 1899–1900; 1901–1903; 1904–1910 | No coach | 9 | 15–10 | .600 |
| 1 | 1910–1917 | Ralph Hutchinson | 7 | 32–8 | .800 |
| 2 | 1918–1919 | John F. McGough | 1 | 2–4 | .333 |
| 3 | 1919–1931 (Note: New Mexico did not field a team for the 1920–21 season.); 1933–1940 | Roy W. Johnson | 18 | 165–146 | .531 |
| 4 | 1931–1933 | Tom Churchill | 2 | 23–12 | .657 |
| 5 | 1940–1941 | Benjamin Sacks | 1 | 5–18 | .217 |
| 6 | 1941–1943 | Willis Barnes | 2 | 12–30 | .286 |
| 7 | 1943–1944 | George White | 1 | 11–2 | .846 |
| 8 | 1944–1951; 1952–1955 | Woody Clements | 10 | 113–119 | .487 |
| 9 | 1951–1952 | Berl Huffman | 1 | 6–19 | .240 |
| 10 | 1955–1958 | Bill Stockton | 3 | 14–57 | .197 |
| 11 | 1958–1962 | Bob Sweeney | 4 | 21–75 | .219 |
| 12 | 1962–1972 | Bob King | 10 | 175–89 | .663 |
| 13 | 1972–1979 | Norm Ellenberger | 7 | 134–62 | .684 |
| 14 | 1979–1980 | Charlie Harrison | 1 | 6–22 | .214 |
| 15 | 1980–1988 | Gary Colson | 8 | 146–106 | .579 |
| 16 | 1988–1999 | Dave Bliss | 11 | 246–108 | .695 |
| 17 | 1999–2002 | Fran Fraschilla | 3 | 55–41 | .573 |
| 18 | 2002–2007 | Ritchie McKay | 5 | 82–69 | .543 |
| 19 | 2007–2013 | Steve Alford | 6 | 155–52 | .749 |
| 20 | 2013–2017 | Craig Neal | 4 | 76–52 | .594 |
| 21 | 2017–2021 | Paul Weir | 4 | 58–63 | .479 |
| 22 | 2021–2025 | Richard Pitino | 4 | 88–49 | .642 |
| 23 | 2025–present | Eric Olen | 1 | 0–0 | – |
| Totals | | 23 coaches | 121 seasons | 1,640–1,213 | .575 |
Records updated through end of 2024–25 season Source
