= 2025–26 UC San Diego Tritons men's basketball team =

American college basketball season

2025–26 UC San Diego Tritons men's basketball

ESPN Events Invitational Adventure Bracket Champions
- Conference: Big West Conference
- Record: 23–11 (12–8 Big West)
- Head coach: Clint Allard (1st season)
- Assistant coaches: Skye Ettin; Rich Shayewitz; Steven Aldridge; Daniel Eberhardt; Denzel Brito
- Home arena: LionTree Arena

2025–26 Big West Conference men's basketball standings
| | Conf. | | | | Overall |
| Team | W | | L | PCT | W | | L | PCT |
|---|---|---|---|---|---|---|---|---|
| UC Irvine | 15 | – | 5 | .750 | 23 | – | 12 | .657 |
| Hawai'i † | 14 | – | 6 | .700 | 24 | – | 9 | .727 |
| Cal State Fullerton | 12 | – | 8 | .600 | 18 | – | 16 | .529 |
| Cal State Northridge | 12 | – | 8 | .600 | 20 | – | 14 | .588 |
| UC San Diego | 12 | – | 8 | .600 | 23 | – | 11 | .676 |
| UC Davis | 11 | – | 9 | .550 | 19 | – | 14 | .576 |
| UC Santa Barbara | 11 | – | 9 | .550 | 18 | – | 14 | .563 |
| Cal Poly | 10 | – | 10 | .500 | 14 | – | 19 | .424 |
| Long Beach State | 6 | – | 14 | .300 | 10 | – | 22 | .313 |
| UC Riverside | 5 | – | 15 | .250 | 10 | – | 22 | .313 |
| Cal State Bakersfield | 2 | – | 18 | .100 | 8 | – | 24 | .250 |
† 2026 Big West tournament winner

The 2025–26 UC San Diego Tritons men's basketball team represented University of California, San Diego in the 2025–26 NCAA Division I men's basketball season. The Tritons were led by 1st-year head coach Clint Allard and played their home games at LionTree Arena in La Jolla, California as members of the Big West Conference. This was the program's second season eligible for NCAA postseason play after completing its four-year transition to Division I in the 2024–25 season.

== Previous season ==
The Tritons were in their first year of NCAA Division I postseason eligibility. They finished the 2024–25 season 30–5, 18–2 in Big West play to win the regular season championship. They defeated UC Santa Barbara in the semifinals of the Big West Tournament and won over UC Irvine to win the Big West championship and clinch the automatic bid to the NCAA Tournament. It marked UC San Diego's first NCAA D1 Tournament appearance. They were seeded as the No.12 seed in the South region, where they fell short to No.5 seed Michigan 65-68 in the first round.

The Big West named Eric Olen as the conference’s coach of the year for the second time in a row. Senior Aniwaniwa Tait-Jones was selected on the All-Big West First Team alongside senior Tyler McGhie. Tait-Jones was also named Big West Player of the Year. Senior Hayden Gray was named Best Defensive Player as well as part of the All-Big West Second Team. Junior Chris Howell was named Best Hustle Player and redshirt junior Justin Rochelin was named Best Sixth Player.

== Offseason ==
=== Coaching Changes ===
Following the 2024-25 season, head coach Eric Olen left the Tritons to take the head coaching position at New Mexico. Olen was part of the Tritons coaching staff since the 2004-05 season after graduating from Spring Hill College, and after spending 9 seasons as an assistant coach, got promoted to the head coaching position in the 2013-14 season. Throughout his 12 seasons serving as head coach, Olen compiled a record of 240-119, with a 148-60 record in conference play, and has led the team to three CCAA regular season titles, four CCAA tournament titles with four NCAA DII tournament appearances. He has also guided the Tritons transitioning to NCAA DI and led the team to gaining their first ever NCAA D1 tournament appearance in their first year of postseason eligibility, seizing both the regular season and conference tournament titles. Olen has been named Big West Coach of the Year twice and NABC Pacific District Coach of the Year once. The coaching change announcement was made on March 30, 2025.

The same day, associate head coach Clint Allard was promoted as the Tritons new head coach. Allard played at UC San Diego from 2004-08 as a four-year starter and three-time team captain. Throughout UC San Diego's Division II era, Allard ranks first in steals made with a total of 130, and ranks in the top ten for points, field goals made, three pointers made, three-pointer field goal percentage, rebounds and assists. After graduation, Allard has spent the last 11 seasons as associate head coach under Olen, where he became the main architect for the team's defense. Notably, the Tritons led the nation in turnover margin (+7.2) and steals (345), and has the lowest turnovers per game (8.7) last season.

On April 4, it was announced that assistant coaches Tom Tankelewicz, Sam Stapleton and Mikey Howell would follow Olen to New Mexico as part of his new coaching staff.

In early June, UC San Diego officially announced the addition of its coaching staff with the hiring of four new assistant coaches: Skye Ettin, Rich Shayewitz, Daniel Eberhardt and Denzel Brito. Ettin most recently worked as an assistant coach for UC Santa Barbara after six years as part of the Princeton coaching staff and helped the Tigers with a Sweet Sixteen appearance. Shayewitz joined from Sonoma State where he was head coach, while Eberhardt, most recently working at Loyola Marymount also brings head coaching experience from Holy Names. Brito came to UC San Diego from George Washington with overseas playing experience.

=== Departures ===
A total of ten players from the 2024-25 roster left UC San Diego, including four graduates and six outgoing transfers. Chris Howell and Milos Vicentic followed Olen to New Mexico, while Justin Rochelin left to join the Pacific Tigers. Starting forward Nordin Kapic transferred to South Carolina, Camden McCormick went to Tampa and Quin Patterson transferred to Idaho State.

Hayden Gray and Aniwaniwa Tait-Jones signed deals to participate in the 2025 NBA Summer League, joining the Boston Celtics and Toronto Raptors respectively. Tyler McGhie signed a contract to play professionally for the Gipuzkoa Basket first team. In August 26, Tait-Jones signed a contract to play professionally for Valmiera Glass Via.

Departures
| Name | Number | Pos. | Height | Weight | Year | Hometown | Reason for departure |
|---|---|---|---|---|---|---|---|
| Camden McCormick | 0 | G | 6'3" | 190 | Junior | San Diego, CA | Transferred to Tampa |
| Hayden Gray | 3 | G | 6'4" | 190 | Senior | San Diego, CA | Graduated |
| Justin Rochelin | 5 | G | 6'5" | 205 | RS Junior | Encino, CA | Transferred to Pacific |
| Chris Howell | 8 | G | 6'6" | 195 | Junior | San Diego, CA | Transferred to New Mexico |
| Aniwaniwa Tait-Jones | 12 | G/F | 6'6" | 200 | Senior | Wellington, New Zealand | Graduated |
| Tyler McGhie | 12 | G/F | 6'5" | 195 | Senior | Denton, TX | Graduated |
| Quin Patterson | 15 | G/F | 6'7" | 205 | Junior | Snoqualmie, WA | Transferred to Idaho State |
| Nordin Kapic | 24 | F | 6'8" | 245 | Junior | Vienna, Austria | Transferred to South Carolina |
| Milos Vicentic | 31 | F | 6'7" | 220 | Graduate Student | Belgrade, Serbia | Transferred to New Mexico |
| Maximo Milovich | 33 | F | 6'8" | 213 | Graduate Student | Buenos Aires, Argentina | Graduated |

=== Incoming transfers ===
UC San Diego added eight transfers to its lineup: Tyson Dunn from Buffalo, Emmanuel Prospere II from Missouri-St. Louis, Bol Dengdit from Portland, Leo Beath from Lynn, Tom Beattie from Hawai'i, Alex Chaikin from Lafayette, Trap Johnson from Montana State and Dimitrije Vukicevic from Washington State.

Incoming transfers
| Name | Number | Pos. | Height | Weight | Year | Hometown | Previous School |
|---|---|---|---|---|---|---|---|
| Tyson Dunn | 3 | G | 6'3" | 190 | Graduate Student | Newmarket, ON | Buffalo |
| Emmanuel Prospere II | 5 | G/F | 6'5" | 212 | Graduate Student | Miami, FL | Missouri-St. Louis |
| Bol Dengdit | 7 | F | 6'11" | 210 | RS Junior | Melbourne, Australia | Portland |
| Leo Beath | 8 | F | 6'8" | 215 | RS Junior | Malibu, CA | Lynn |
| Tom Beattie | 9 | G | 6'5" | 195 | Junior | Auckland, New Zealand | Hawai'i |
| Alex Chaikin | 10 | G | 6'5" | 175 | Sophomore | Williamsburg, VA | Lafayette |
| Trap Johnson | 23 | G | 6'6" | 200 | RS Freshman | Belton, TX | Montana State |
| Dimitrije Vukicevic | 33 | C | 7'0" | 245 | RS Freshman | Belgrade, Serbia | Washington State |

=== Recruits ===
College recruiting
| Name | Hometown | School | Height | Weight | Commit date |
|---|---|---|---|---|---|
| Hudson Mayes; G | Los Angeles, CA | Redondo Union HS | 6 ft 5 in (1.96 m) | 200 lb (91 kg) | Apr 13, 2025 |
| Hudson Mayes; G | Recruit ratings: 247Sports: | | | | |
| Jaden Vance; F | Phoenix, AZ | Arizona Compass Prep | 6 ft 6 in (1.98 m) | 180 lb (82 kg) | Apr 28, 2025 |
| Jaden Vance; F | Recruit ratings: 247Sports: | | | | |
Overall recruit ranking:
Note: In many cases, Scout, Rivals, 247Sports, On3, and ESPN may conflict in their listings of height and weight.; In these cases, the average was taken. ESPN grades are on a 100-point scale.; Sources:

== Preseason ==
=== Big West Conference Preseason Poll ===
The Big West Conference released its preseason coaches' poll on October 16, 2025. The Tritons were predicted to finish fourth in the conference with 69 points.

Big West Preseason Poll
| Place | Team | Points |
|---|---|---|
| 1 | UC Irvine | 98 (8) |
| 2 | UC Santa Barbara | 93 (3) |
| 3 | Hawai'i | 76 |
| 4 | UC San Diego | 69 |
| 5 | Cal State Northridge | 63 |
| 6 | UC Davis | 58 |
| 7 | Cal Poly | 54 |
| 8 | Long Beach State | 31 |
| 9 | UC Riverside | 26 |
| 10 | Cal State Bakersfield | 20 |
| 11 | Cal State Fullerton | 17 |
(#) first-place votes

== Roster ==
2025–26 UC San Diego Tritons men's basketball team
Players
Coaches

| Pos. | # | Name | Height | Weight | Year | Previous school | Hometown |
|---|---|---|---|---|---|---|---|
| G | 0 | Hudson Mayes | 6 ft 5 in (1.96 m) | 200 lb (91 kg) | Fr | Redondo Union HS | Los Angeles, California |
| G | 1 | Ryder Elisaldez | 6 ft 3 in (1.91 m) | 175 lb (79 kg) | So | Bishop Gorman HS | Las Vegas, Nevada |
| G/F | 2 | Christopher Cox | 6 ft 8 in (2.03 m) | 208 lb (94 kg) | RS Fr | Cottonwood HS | Salt Lake City, Utah |
| G | 3 | Tyson Dunn | 6 ft 3 in (1.91 m) | 190 lb (86 kg) | GS | Buffalo | Newmarket, Ontario |
| F | 4 | Cade Pendleton | 6 ft 10 in (2.08 m) | 210 lb (95 kg) | RS Jr | East Hamilton HS | Chattanooga, Tennessee |
| G/F | 5 | Emmanuel Prospere II | 6 ft 5 in (1.96 m) | 212 lb (96 kg) | GS | Missouri-St. Louis | Miami, Florida |
| F | 7 | Bol Dengdit | 6 ft 11 in (2.11 m) | 210 lb (95 kg) | RS Jr | Portland | Melbourne, Australia |
| F | 8 | Leo Beath | 6 ft 8 in (2.03 m) | 215 lb (98 kg) | RS Jr | Lynn | Malibu, California |
| G | 9 | Tom Beattie | 6 ft 5 in (1.96 m) | 195 lb (88 kg) | Jr | Hawai'i | Auckland, New Zealand |
| G | 10 | Alex Chaikin | 6 ft 5 in (1.96 m) | 170 lb (77 kg) | So | Lafayette | Williamsburg, Virginia |
| G | 11 | Jasen Brooks | 6 ft 0 in (1.83 m) | 195 lb (88 kg) | RS So | Cleveland HS | Cleveland, Tennessee |
| F | 13 | Jaden Vance | 6 ft 6 in (1.98 m) | 180 lb (82 kg) | Fr | Arizona Compass Prep | Phoenix, Arizona |
| G | 20 | Aidan Burke | 6 ft 3 in (1.91 m) | 190 lb (86 kg) | Jr | Phillips Exeter Academy | Los Gatos, California |
| G | 22 | Yaqub Mir | 6 ft 2 in (1.88 m) | 175 lb (79 kg) | RS So | Granite Bay HS | Granite Bay, California |
| G | 23 | Trap Johnson | 6 ft 6 in (1.98 m) | 200 lb (91 kg) | RS Fr | Montana State | Belton, Texas |
| C | 33 | Dimitrije Vukicevic | 7 ft 0 in (2.13 m) | 245 lb (111 kg) | RS Fr | Washington State | Belgrade, Serbia |

Head coach

- Clint Allard (UC San Diego)

Assistant coach(es)

- Skye Ettin (TCNJ)
- Rich Shayewitz (Sonoma State)
- Steven Aldridge (San Diego City)
- Daniel Eberhardt (Cal Maritime)
- Denzel Brito (Loyola Chicago)

Legend

- (C) Team captain
- (S) Suspended
- (I) Ineligible
- (W) Walk-on
- Injured
- Current redshirt

Roster
Last update: July 22, 2025

== Schedule and results ==
| Date time, TV | Rank^{#} | Opponent^{#} | Result | Record | High points | High rebounds | High assists | Site (attendance) city, state |
Exhibition
| October 24, 2025*; 7:00 pm | | Cal State San Marcos | W 74–72 ^{OT} | | 14 – Beattie | 9 – Beath | 2 – Tied | Liontree Arena (2,026); La Jolla, CA |
Regular season
| November 3, 2025*; 7:00 pm, ESPN+ | | La Verne | W 105–73 | 1–0 | 24 – Beath | 9 – Dengdit | 3 – Tied | Liontree Arena (2,041); La Jolla, CA |
| November 8, 2025*; 7:00 pm, ESPN+ | | Houston Christian | W 78–60 | 2–0 | 18 – Beattie | 6 – Beattie | 4 – Beattie | Liontree Arena (3,614); La Jolla, CA |
| November 12, 2025*; 7:00 pm | | at Fresno State | W 78–73 | 3–0 | 22 – Beath | 7 – Beath | 4 – Prospere II | Save Mart Center (2,950); Fresno, CA |
| November 15, 2025*; 1:00 pm, ESPN+ | | Idaho | W 75–67 | 4–0 | 15 – Tied | 7 – Tied | 6 – Beattie | Liontree Arena (2,486); La Jolla, CA |
| November 24, 2025*; 1:30 pm, ESPNU | | vs. Temple; ESPN Events Invitational Adventure Bracket quarterfinals | W 91–76 | 5–0 | 29 – Beath | 7 – Beattie | 8 – Prospere II | State Farm Field House; Kissimmee, FL |
| November 25, 2025*; 2:00 pm, ESPN2 | | vs. Bradley; ESPN Events Invitational Adventure Bracket semifinals | W 87–77 | 6–0 | 26 – Beath | 7 – Beattie | 4 – Beattie | State Farm Field House; Kissimmee, FL |
| November 26, 2025*; 9:00 am, ESPN2 | | vs. Towson; ESPN Events Invitational Adventure Bracket championship game | W 87–73 | 7–0 | 16 – Beath | 5 – Tied | 6 – Beattie | State Farm Field House; Kissimmee, FL |
| December 2, 2025*; 7:00 pm | | at Nevada | L 70–76 | 7–1 | 17 – Beath | 9 – Mayes | 3 – Tied | Lawlor Events Center (7,211); Reno, NV |
| December 6, 2025; 6:00 pm, ESPN+ | | at Long Beach State | W 80–74 | 8–1 (1–0) | 18 – Burke | 11 – Beath | 5 – Tied | Walter Pyramid (1,153); Long Beach, CA |
| December 13, 2025*; 9:00 pm | | vs. Tulane; Jack Jones Classic | W 93–67 | 9–1 | 21 – Beath | 10 – Burke | 6 – Beath | Lee's Family Forum; Henderson, NV |
| December 16, 2025*; 8:30 pm, ESPN+ | | at Loyola Marymount | W 67–57 | 10–1 | 15 – Beath | 9 – Burke | 4 – Prospere II | Gersten Pavilion (747); Los Angeles, CA |
| December 19, 2025*; 7:00 pm, ESPN+ | | San Diego | L 80–82 | 10–2 | 18 – Dengdit | 7 – Tied | 6 – Prospere II | Liontree Arena (2,711); La Jolla, CA |
| December 28, 2025*; 4:00 pm, ESPN+ | | Stanton | W 85–62 | 11–2 | 18 – Beath | 10 – Dengdit | 4 – Tied | Liontree Arena (1,472); La Jolla, CA |
| January 1, 2026; 7:00 pm, ESPN+ | | at Cal Poly | L 65–67 | 11–3 (1–1) | 17 – Chaikin | 12 – Tied | 4 – Prospere II | Mott Athletics Center (1,521); San Luis Obispo, CA |
| January 3, 2026; 7:00 pm, ESPN+ | | Hawai'i | W 83–73 | 12–3 (2–1) | 21 – Chaikin | 7 – Beattie | 8 – Beattie | Liontree Arena (1,808); La Jolla, CA |
| January 8, 2026; 7:00 pm, ESPN+ | | Cal State Fullerton | L 71–88 | 12–4 (2–2) | 15 – Dengdit | 7 – Burke | 3 – Prospere II | Liontree Arena (2,137); La Jolla, CA |
| January 10, 2026; 5:00 pm, ESPN+ | | at UC Riverside | W 69–66 | 13–4 (3–2) | 17 – Dengdit | 11 – Beattie | 4 – Prospere II | SRC Arena (388); Riverside, CA |
| January 15, 2026; 7:00 pm, ESPN+ | | Cal State Northridge | L 79–84 | 13–5 (3–3) | 22 – Chaikin | 9 – Mayes | 3 – Tied | Liontree Arena (3,117); La Jolla, CA |
| January 17, 2026; 6:30 pm, SSN | | at Cal State Bakersfield | W 83–62 | 14–5 (4–3) | 20 – Beath | 9 – Beath | 4 – Beattie | Icardo Center (123); Bakersfield, CA |
| January 22, 2026; 6:00 pm, ESPN+ | | at UC Davis | W 80–74 | 15–5 (5–3) | 19 – Tied | 12 – Mayes | 7 – Prospere II | University Credit Union Center (1,475); Davis, CA |
| January 24, 2026; 7:00 pm, ESPN+ | | UC Irvine | L 59–61 | 15–6 (5–4) | 16 – Beath | 10 – Beath | 5 – Prospere II | Liontree Arena (4,000); La Jolla, CA |
| January 29, 2026; 7:00 pm, ESPN+ | | UC Santa Barbara | L 48–62 | 15–7 (5–5) | 15 – Dengdit | 8 – Beath | 2 – Tied | Liontree Arena (3,704); La Jolla, CA |
| January 31, 2026; 5:00 pm, ESPN+ | | at Cal State Northridge | L 64–81 | 15–8 (5–6) | 11 – Mayes | 8 – Mayes | 5 – Mayes | Premier America Credit Union Arena (715); Northridge, CA |
| February 5, 2026; 7:00 pm, ESPN+ | | at Long Beach State | W 77–74 | 16–8 (6–6) | 18 – Dengdit | 12 – Dengdit | 4 – Mayes | Liontree Arena (1,867); La Jolla, CA |
| February 7, 2026; 9:00 pm, ESPN+ | | at Hawai'i | L 67–72 | 16–9 (6–7) | 14 – Beattie | 10 – Mayes | 3 – Beattie | Stan Sheriff Center (6,171); Honolulu, HI |
| February 12, 2026; 7:00 pm, ESPN+ | | UC Davis | W 68–51 | 17–9 (7–7) | 20 – Dengdit | 12 – Mayes | 3 – Mayes | Liontree Arena (1,874); La Jolla, CA |
| February 14, 2026; 7:00 pm, ESPN+ | | UC Riverside | W 72–66 | 18–9 (8–7) | 24 – Mayes | 8 – Dengdit | 4 – Mayes | Liontree Arena (1,660); La Jolla, CA |
| February 21, 2026; 7:00 pm, ESPN+ | | at UC Irvine | W 71–69 | 19–9 (9–7) | 17 – Mayes | 8 – Mayes | 5 – Dengdit | Bren Events Center (3,750); Irvine, CA |
| February 26, 2026; 7:00 pm, ESPN+ | | Cal State Bakersfield | W 84–72 | 20–9 (10–7) | 21 – Mayes | 10 – Beattie | 4 – Beath | Liontree Arena (1,694); La Jolla, CA |
| February 28, 2026; 7:00 pm, ESPN+ | | Cal Poly | W 80–64 | 21–9 (11–7) | 17 – Chaikin | 7 – Beath | 5 – Beath | Liontree Arena (3,331); La Jolla, CA |
| March 5, 2026; 7:00 pm, ESPN+ | | at Cal State Fullerton | L 71–75 | 21–10 (11–8) | 13 – Mayes | 8 – Mayes | 9 – Beattie | Titan Gym (848); Fullerton, CA |
| March 7, 2026; 6:00 pm, ESPN+ | | at UC Santa Barbara | W 64–63 | 22–10 (12–8) | 15 – Dengdit | 8 – Beath | 4 – Beattie | The Thunderdome (3,899); Santa Barbara, CA |
Big West tournament
| March 11, 2026; 6:00 pm, ESPN+ | (5) | vs. (8) Cal Poly; First Round | W 72–69 | 23–10 | 23 – Mayes | 8 – Beath | 4 – Beattie | Lee's Family Forum (1,035); Henderson, NV |
| March 12, 2026; 6:00 pm, ESPN+ | (5) | vs. (4) Cal State Northridge; Quarterfinals | L 70–80 | 23–11 | 22 – Beattie | 7 – Beattie | 5 – Beattie | Lee's Family Forum; Henderson, NV |
*Non-conference game. ^{#}Rankings from AP Poll. (#) Tournament seedings in parentheses. All times are in Pacific.

== Game summaries ==
=== vs Cal State San Marcos (Exhibition) ===
October 24, 2025
7:00 p.m.

Recap

Cal State San Marcos Cougars 72, UC San Diego Tritons 74 (OT)
Scoring by half: 34–30, 30–34 Overtime: 8-10
| Pts: Dexter Stratton, 14; Rebs: Dexter Stratton, 10; Asts: Nate Simon, 3 | Pts: Tom Beattie, 14; Rebs: Leo Beath, 9 Asts: Tied, 2 |

Liontree Arena, San Diego, CA
Attendance: 2,026
Referees: Grant Vermeer, Martin Cichocki, Bill Vinovich

=== vs La Verne ===
ESPN+

November 3, 2025
7:00 p.m.

Recap

La Verne Leopards 73, UC San Diego Tritons 105
Scoring by half: 30–47, 43–58
| Pts: Jackson Gray, 12; Rebs: Tied, 4 Asts: Tristan Guzman, 4 | Pts: Leo Beath, 24; Rebs: Bol Dengdit, 9 Asts: Tied, 4 |

Liontree Arena, San Diego, CA
Attendance: 2,041
Referees: Ben Wolfs, Gregg Morstein, Jeff Flowers

=== vs Houston Christian ===
ESPN+

November 8, 2025
7:00 p.m.

Recap

Houston Christian Huskies 60, UC San Diego Tritons 78
Scoring by half: 21–35, 39–43
| Pts: D'Aundre Samuels, 12; Rebs: Demarco Bethea, 5 Asts: Trent Johnson, 4 | Pts: Tom Beattie, 18; Rebs: Tom Beattie, 6 Asts: Tom Beattie, 4 |

Liontree Arena, San Diego, CA
Attendance: 3,614
Referees: Michael Mojica, De Selle Dean, Bill Vinovich

=== at Fresno State ===
November 12, 2025
6:00 p.m.

Recap

UC San Diego Tritons 78, Fresno State Bulldogs 73
Scoring by half: 42–30, 36–43
| Pts: Leo Beath, 22; Rebs: Leo Beath, 7 Asts: Emanuel Prospere II, 4 | Pts: Jac Mani, 21; Rebs: Cameron Faas, 8 Asts: Zion Collins, 8 |

Save Mart Center, Fresno, CA
Attendance: 2,950
Referees: Kevin Raher, Crystal Hogan, Larry Scirotto

=== vs Idaho ===
ESPN+

November 15, 2025
1:00 p.m.

Recap

Idaho Vandals 68, UC San Diego Tritons 75
Scoring by half: 36–26, 31–49
| Pts: Kolton Mitchell, 18; Rebs: Jackson Rasmussen, 8 Asts: Kolton Mitchell, 3 | Pts: Tied, 15; Rebs: Tied, 7 Asts: Tom Beattie, 6 |

Liontree Arena, San Diego, CA
Attendance: 2,486
Referees: Chris Hudson, Matthew Rusakin, Eric Curry

=== Temple (ESPN Events Invitational Adventure Bracket quarterfinals) ===
ESPNU

November 24, 2025
1:30 p.m.

Recap

Temple Owls 76, UC San Diego Tritons 91
Scoring by half: 36-47, 40–44
| Pts: Masiah Gilyard, 16; Rebs: Masiah Gilyard, 8 Asts: Tied, 2 | Pts: Leo Beath, 29; Rebs: Tom Beattie, 7 Asts: Emmanuel Prospere II, 8 |

State Farm Field House, Kissimmee, FL
Referees: Anthony Eades, Keith Patterson, Anthony Jordan

=== Bradley (ESPN Events Invitational Adventure Bracket semifinals) ===
ESPN2

November 25, 2025
2:00 p.m.

Recap

UC San Diego Tritons 87, Bradley Braves 77
Scoring by half: 44-33, 43-44
| Pts: Leo Beath, 26; Rebs: Tom Beattie, 7 Asts: Tom Beattie, 4 | Pts: Jaquan Johnson, 29; Rebs: AJ Smith, 13; Asts: Jaquan Johnson, 6 |

State Farm Field House, Kissimmee, FL
Referees: Ed Corliss, Sean Hull, AJ Desai

=== Towson (ESPN Events Invitational Adventure Bracket final) ===
ESPN2

November 26, 2025
9:00 a.m.

Recap

Towson Tigers 73, UC San Diego Tritons 87
Scoring by half: 31-50, 42-37
| Pts: Tyler Tejada, 27; Rebs: Tied, 5 Asts: Tyler Tejada, 3 | Pts: Leo Beath, 16; Rebs: Tied, 5 Asts: Tom Beattie, 6 |

State Farm Field House, Kissimmee, FL
Referees: Sean Hull, Anthony Jordan, AJ Desai

=== at Nevada ===
December 2, 2025
7:00 p.m.

Recap

UC San Diego Tritons 70, Nevada Wolf Pack 76
Scoring by half: 27–35, 43-41
| Pts: Leo Beath, 17; Rebs: Hudson Mayes, 9 Asts: Tied, 3 | Pts: Corey Camper Jr., 15; Rebs: Peyton White, 9 Asts: Tayshawn Comer, 6 |

Lawlor Events Center, Reno, NV
Attendance: 7,211
Referees: Nate Harris, Amy Bonner, Bryan McNutt

=== at Long Beach State ===
ESPN+

December 6, 2025
6:00 p.m.

Recap

UC San Diego Tritons 80, Long Beach State Beach 74
Scoring by half: 34–30, 46–44
| Pts: Aidan Burke, 18; Rebs: Leo Beath, 11; Asts: Tied, 5 | Pts: Gavin Skykes, 20; Rebs: Shay Johnson Jr., 7 Asts: Rob Diaz, 5 |

Walter Pyramid, Long Beach, CA
Attendance: 1,153
Referees: Michael Mojica, Jeffery Malham, Darron George

=== Tulane (Jack Jones Classic) ===
December 13, 2025
9:30 p.m.

Recap

Tulane Green Wave 67, UC San Diego Tritons 93
Scoring by half: 31-53, 36-40
| Pts: Rowan Brumbaugh, 19; Rebs: Tyler Ringgold, 11; Asts: Rowan Brumbaugh, 5 | Pts: Leo Beath, 21; Rebs: Aidan Burke, 10; Asts: Leo Beath, 6 |

Lee's Family Forum, Henderson, NV
Referees: Kristyne Esparza, Michael Wallace, Doug Sturdivan

=== at Loyola Marymount ===
ESPN+

December 16, 2025
8:30 p.m.

Recap

UC San Diego Tritons 67, Loyola Marymount Lions 57
Scoring by half: 34–26, 33–31
| Pts: Leo Beath, 15; Rebs: Aidan Burke, 9 Asts: Emanuel Prospere II, 4 | Pts: Rodney Brown Jr., 19; Rebs: Jalen Shelley, 6 Asts: Jan Vide, 5 |

Gersten Pavilion, Los Angeles, CA
Attendance: 747
Referees: Darron George, Jason Garretson, Clarence Armstrong

=== vs San Diego ===
ESPN+

December 21, 2025
7:00 p.m.

Recap

San Diego Toreros 82, UC San Diego Tritons 80
Scoring by half: 40–31, 42–49
| Pts: Ty-Laur Johnson, 23; Rebs: Alejandro Aviles, 8 Asts: Ty-Laur Johnson, 7 | Pts: Bol Dengdit, 18; Rebs: Tied, 7 Asts: Emanuel Prospere II, 6 |

Liontree Arena, San Diego, CA
Attendance: 2,711
Referees: Michael Mojica, Tommy Johnson, Randy McCall

=== vs Stanton ===
ESPN+

December 28, 2025
4:00 p.m.

Recap

Stanton Elks 62, UC San Diego Tritons 85
Scoring by half: 31–35, 31–50
| Pts: Jovanni Tapia, 22; Rebs: Nigel McKay, 7 Asts: Jermaine Patton Jr., 5 | Pts: Leo Beath, 18; Rebs: Bol Dengdit, 10; Asts: Tied, 4 |

Liontree Arena, San Diego, CA
Attendance: 1,472
Referees: Grant Jeffres, Jacob Hirz, Nomi Kidwai

=== at Cal Poly ===
ESPN+

January 1, 2026
7:00 p.m.

Recap

UC San Diego Tritons 65, Cal Poly Mustangs 67
Scoring by half: 42–39, 23-28
| Pts: Alex Chaikin, 17; Rebs: Tied, 12; Asts: Emanuel Prospere II, 4 | Pts: Hamad Mousa, 26; Rebs: Cayden Ward, 11; Asts: Jake Davis, 3 |

Mott Athletics Center, San Luis Obispo, CA
Attendance: 1,521
Referees: Chase Shea, Eric Dust, Chance Moore

=== vs Hawai'i ===
ESPN+

January 3, 2026
7:00 p.m.

Recap

Hawai'i Rainbow Warriors 73, UC San Diego Tritons 83
Scoring by half: 29–36, 44–47
| Pts: Harry Rouhliadeff, 16; Rebs: Gytis Nemeiksa, 6 Asts: Hunter Erickson, 6 | Pts: Alex Chaikin, 21; Rebs: Tom Beattie, 7 Asts: Tom Beattie, 8 |

Liontree Arena, San Diego, CA
Attendance: 1,808
Referees: John Jenkins Jr., Jacob Hirz, Justin Shamion
