= Mike DeGeorge =

American basketball coach (born 1970)

Current position
- Title: Head coach
- Team: Cal Poly
- Conference: Big West
- Record: 30–38 (.441)

Biographical details
- Born: January 3, 1970 (age 56); Colorado Springs, Colorado, U.S.
- Education: Monmouth College

Playing career

Basketball
- 1989–1992: Monmouth (IL)

Golf
- 1991–1992: Monmouth (IL)

Coaching career (HC unless noted)

Basketball
- 1993–1994: Beloit (assistant)
- 1994–1999: Lawrence (assistant)
- 1999–2000: Grinnell (assistant)
- 2000–2004: Eureka
- 2004–2009: Cornell (IA)
- 2010–2018: Rhodes
- 2018–2024: Colorado Mesa
- 2024–present: Cal Poly

Head coaching record
- Overall: 350–329 (.515)
- Tournaments: 0–2 (NCAA Division III); 4–4 (NCAA Division II)

Michael E. DeGeorge (born January 3, 1970) is an American basketball coach who is the current head coach of the Cal Poly Mustangs. He played college basketball for the Monmouth Fighting Scots and has previously coached the Beloit Buccaneers, Lawrence Vikings, Grinnell Pioneers, Eureka Red Devils, Cornell, Rhodes Lynx and Colorado Mesa Mavericks.

== Early life ==
DeGeorge was born in Colorado Springs, Colorado, the son of coach Ed DeGeorge. He grew up in Wisconsin. DeGeorge attended Monmouth College in Illinois where he played four years of basketball and two years of golf, helping the basketball team win two conference championships with two NCAA Division III tournament appearances. He received a bachelor's degree in psychology from Monmouth in 1992 and later received a master's degree from Viterbo University in 1999. Prior to his coaching career, DeGeorge spent two years as a teacher, first at Marmion Academy in 1992, and then at Durand High School in 1993, both schools in Illinois.

== Coaching career ==
DeGeorge began his coaching career as an assistant with the Beloit College basketball team for head coach Knapton in the 1993–94 season. He subsequently was an assistant for the Lawrence Vikings from 1994 to 1999 and for the Grinnell Pioneers from 1999 to 2000. He was the recruiting coordinator at Grinnell and learned the run-and-gun playstyle there, which he utilized later in his career as a head coach.

DeGeorge received his first head coaching job with the Division III Eureka Red Devils in 2000, serving four seasons in the position. He brought the team from having had a mere two wins the year before he arrived to 17 wins by his final season, which was their best record in over 10 years. DeGeorge then was hired by the Cornell Rams and served with the team from 2004 to 2009, helping them have their first NCAA tournament appearance. He helped the 2008–09 Cornell team win the Iowa Intercollegiate Athletic Conference (IIAC) championship, with DeGeorge being chosen the IIAC's Coach of the Year.

DeGeorge was hired as the head coach of the Rhodes Lynx in 2010. He served in the position for eight seasons, coming in after the team had recorded 10 straight losing seasons. He helped them share the Southern Athletic Association (SAA) championship in 2012–13 and repeated in 2014–15. He was named the SAA Coach of the Year for the 2016–17 season, in which his team were the national leaders in assists, won the SAA championship, and made their first NCAA Division III Tournament appearance in 24 years.

In 2018, DeGeorge became the head coach of the Division II Colorado Mesa Mavericks. They had won 19 games total in the two seasons before his arrival, but he led them to 19 wins in his first season there. He then helped them win consecutive Rocky Mountain Athletic Conference (RMAC) championships in his second and third seasons, which were the first RMAC titles in school history. He ultimately served six seasons with the Mavericks and reached five NCAA tournaments while having an average of 23 wins per season; DeGeorge was the RMAC and NCAA West Region Coach of the Year in 2020–21 (when he helped Colorado Mesa finish the regular season ranked first nationally) and received the RMAC Coach of the Year award a second time for the 2022–23 season.

In March 2024, DeGeorge received his first Division I coaching job, being named the head coach of the Cal Poly Mustangs. In his debut season with Cal Poly, DeGeorge guided the program to a 12-win improvement from its prior year (the season's fifth-highest leap nationally), along with a trip to the Big West Tournament semifinals.

== Head coaching record ==
Record table
Season	Team	Overall	Conference	Standing	Postseason
Eureka Red Devils (Northern Illinois-Iowa Conference) (2000–2004)
2000–01	Eureka	2–23	1–11		
2001–02	Eureka	5–20	2–10		
2002–03	Eureka	8–17	3–9		
2003–04	Eureka	17–10	9–3		
Eureka:		16–70 (.186)	15–33 (.313)		
Cornell Rams (Iowa Conference / Iowa Intercollegiate Athletic Conference) (2004–2009)
2004–05	Cornell	6–19	3–13	9th	
2005–06	Cornell	3–22	2–14	9th	
2006–07	Cornell	8–17	4–12	8th	
2007–08	Cornell	9–17	7–9	6th	
2008–09	Cornell	21–7	12–4	2nd	NCAA Division III First Round
Cornell:		47–82 (.364)	28–52 (.350)		
Rhodes Lynx (Southern Collegiate Athletic Conference / Southern Athletic Association) (2010–2018)
2010–11	Rhodes	7–18	3–12	12th	
2011–12	Rhodes	18–9	12–4	3rd	
2012–13	Rhodes	16–10	11–3	2nd	
2013–14	Rhodes	15–12	7–7	4th	
2014–15	Rhodes	20–7	11–3	2nd	
2015–16	Rhodes	10–16	4–10	6th	
2016–17	Rhodes	17–11	11–3	1st	NCAA Division III First Round
2017–18	Rhodes	13–13	7–7	4th	
Rhodes:		116–96 (.547)	66–49 (.574)		
Colorado Mesa Mavericks (Rocky Mountain Athletic Conference) (2018–2024)
2018–19	Colorado Mesa	19–10	14–8	5th	
2019–20	Colorado Mesa	21–10	14–8	4th	NCAA Division II Canceled
2020–21	Colorado Mesa	21–2	18–1	1st	NCAA Division II First Round
2021–22	Colorado Mesa	26–10	17–5	2nd	NCAA Division II Sweet 16
2022–23	Colorado Mesa	25–6	19–3	2nd	NCAA Division II First Round
2023–24	Colorado Mesa	29–5	21–1	1st	NCAA Division II Sweet 16
Colorado Mesa:		141–43 (.766)	103–26 (.798)		
Cal Poly Mustangs (Big West Conference) (2024–present)
2024–25	Cal Poly	16–19	8–12	T–7th	
2025–26	Cal Poly	14–19	10–10	8th	
2026–27	Cal Poly	0–0	0–0		
Cal Poly:		30–38 (.441)	18–22 (.450)		
Total:		350–329 (.515)			
National champion Postseason invitational champion Conference regular season champion Conference regular season and conference tournament champion Division regular season champion Division regular season and conference tournament champion Conference tournament champion
