= Eric Olen =

American college basketball coach (born 1980)

Current position
- Title: Head coach
- Team: New Mexico
- Conference: Mountain West
- Record: 29–12 (.707)
- Annual salary: $1.45 million

Biographical details
- Born: October 15, 1980 (age 46); Mobile, Alabama, U.S.

Playing career
- 1999–2004: Spring Hill

Coaching career (HC unless noted)
- 2004–2013: UC San Diego (assistant)
- 2013–2025: UC San Diego
- 2025–present: New Mexico

Head coaching record
- Overall: 269–131 (.673)
- Tournaments: 0–1 (NCAA DI); 5–4 (NCAA DII); 0–1 (CBI); 3–1 (NIT)

Accomplishments and honors

Championships
- 3 CCAA regular season (2017, 2019, 2020); 4 CCAA tournament (2017–2020); Big West tournament (2025); Big West regular season (2025)

Awards
- 2× Big West Coach of the Year (2024, 2025); 2× CCAA Coach of the Year (2017, 2020); NABC Pacific District Coach of the Year (2025); NABC West Region Coach of the Year (2020)

Eric Olen (born October 15, 1980) is an American college basketball coach who is the current head men's basketball coach at the University of New Mexico. He was previously the head coach at UC San Diego from 2013 to 2025.

== Playing career ==
Olen grew up in Mobile, Alabama and prepped at McGill–Toolen Catholic High School. Olen went on to play collegiately at Spring Hill College, where he was part of three straight NAIA national tournament berths for the Badgers, including Elite Eight appearances in 2000 and 2001.

== Coaching career ==
=== UC San Diego ===
Olen joined his former college coach Bill Carr as an assistant at UC San Diego in 2004, and stayed in the role until 2013 before being promoted to head coach after then head coach Chris Carlson left for an administrative role with the West Coast Conference. In seven years at the Division II level, Olen led the Tritons to three CCAA regular season titles, four conference tournament titles and four NCAA tournament appearances.

Olen guided the Tritons men's basketball program into NCAA Division I status as members of the Big West Conference beginning in 2020–21. The Tritons capped the 4-year reclassification period with a 21-win season in 2023–24, highlighted by a second-place finish in Big West. Olen was named Big West Coach of the Year and was a finalist for the Hugh Durham Award, given annually to the nation's top Division I mid-major coach.

In 2024–25, Olen led UCSD to an NCAA Tournament berth in its first year of postseason eligibility at the Division I level, capturing Big West regular season and tournament championships and earned Big West Coach of the Year honors for the second year in a row. He was also voted the 2025 NABC Pacific District Coach of the Year.

Olen departed UC San Diego as its all-time winningest men's basketball head coach.

=== New Mexico ===
In March 2025, Olen was named the head coach of the University of New Mexico men's basketball program, succeeding Richard Pitino who departed for Xavier.

In his first season with the Lobos, Olen led New Mexico to a 26–11 overall record and a semifinal appearance in the NIT, marking the second most successful season by a first-year head coach in program history. Behind an up-tempo offensive system and key contributors including Jake Hall, the Lobos averaged over 81 points per game and posted a 17–3 home record at The Pit. Following the successful season, Olen agreed to a five-year contract extension with New Mexico in May 2026.

== Head coaching record ==
Record table
Season	Team	Overall	Conference	Standing	Postseason
UC San Diego Tritons (California Collegiate Athletic Association) (2013–2020)
2013–14	UC San Diego	15–11	11–11	7th	
2014–15	UC San Diego	16–11	14–8	T–4th	
2015–16	UC San Diego	24–8	15–5	2nd	NCAA Division II Sweet 16
2016–17	UC San Diego	27–6	17–3	1st	NCAA Division II Sweet 16
2017–18	UC San Diego	21–11	15–7	T–3rd	NCAA Division II Round of 64
2018–19	UC San Diego	26–8	17–5	T–1st	NCAA Division II Round of 32
2019–20	UC San Diego	30–1	21–1	1st	Tournament cancelled
UC San Diego Tritons (Big West Conference) (2020–2025)
2020–21	UC San Diego	7–10	4–8*		
2021–22	UC San Diego	13–16	7–11	8th	
2022–23	UC San Diego	10–20	5–13	9th	
2023–24	UC San Diego	21–12	15–5	2nd	CBI First Round
2024–25	UC San Diego	30–5	18–2	1st	NCAA Division I Round of 64
UC San Diego:		240–119 (.669)	159–79 (.668)		
New Mexico Lobos (Mountain West Conference) (2025–present)
2025–26	New Mexico	26–11	13–7	T–3rd	NIT Semifinals
2026–27	New Mexico	3–1	0–0		
New Mexico:		29–12 (.707)	13–7 (.650)		
Total:		269–131 (.673)			
National champion Postseason invitational champion Conference regular season champion Conference regular season and conference tournament champion Division regular season champion Division regular season and conference tournament champion Conference tournament champion

* Due to the 2020–21 season being the first year of transitioning to DI, games in the Big West did not count towards the Tritons' standings and conference record.
