= 2025–26 UC Irvine Anteaters men's basketball team =

American college basketball season

2025–26 UC Irvine Anteaters men's basketball

Big West regular season champions Sun Bowl Invitational Champions

NIT First Round, 72–75
- Conference: Big West Conference
- Record: 23–12 (15–5 Big West)
- Head coach: Russell Turner (16th season)
- Assistant coaches: Ali Ton (3rd season); Patrick Scully (2nd season); Julius Smith (2nd season); Nick Booker (1st season); Brady Boznanski (1st season)
- Home arena: Bren Events Center (Capacity: 5,000)

2025–26 Big West Conference men's basketball standings
| | Conf. | | | | Overall |
| Team | W | | L | PCT | W | | L | PCT |
|---|---|---|---|---|---|---|---|---|
| UC Irvine | 15 | – | 5 | .750 | 23 | – | 12 | .657 |
| Hawai'i † | 14 | – | 6 | .700 | 24 | – | 9 | .727 |
| Cal State Fullerton | 12 | – | 8 | .600 | 18 | – | 16 | .529 |
| Cal State Northridge | 12 | – | 8 | .600 | 20 | – | 14 | .588 |
| UC San Diego | 12 | – | 8 | .600 | 23 | – | 11 | .676 |
| UC Davis | 11 | – | 9 | .550 | 19 | – | 14 | .576 |
| UC Santa Barbara | 11 | – | 9 | .550 | 18 | – | 14 | .563 |
| Cal Poly | 10 | – | 10 | .500 | 14 | – | 19 | .424 |
| Long Beach State | 6 | – | 14 | .300 | 10 | – | 22 | .313 |
| UC Riverside | 5 | – | 15 | .250 | 10 | – | 22 | .313 |
| Cal State Bakersfield | 2 | – | 18 | .100 | 8 | – | 24 | .250 |
† 2026 Big West tournament winner

The 2025–26 UC Irvine Anteaters men's basketball team represented the University of California, Irvine in the 2025–26 NCAA Division I men's basketball season. They played their home games at the Bren Events Center in Irvine, California as a member of the Big West Conference. The Anteaters were led by 16th-year head coach Russell Turner. After losing to Hawai'i in the Big West championship, the Anteaters were not chosen for the NCAA tournament. Since the Anteaters won the Big West regular season, they were offered an automatic bid and four seed in the NIT. This was the fourth year in a row the Anteaters participated in the NIT, and second year in a row with the opportunity to host at least one game. Their season ended with their loss to UNLV in the first round, and officially failed to improve upon last year's record.

== Previous season ==
The 2024–25 Anteaters team finished 32–7, including a 17–3 conference record. They were ousted in the Big West tournament final by UC San Diego, losing 61–75. They finished as runner-up in the NIT tournament, losing 84–85 in overtime to Chattanooga.

== Offseason ==
=== Preseason Polls ===
The Big West Media Poll was released on October 13, 2025. This is the inaugural media poll for the Big West Conference, conducted by the UCSD Guardian. It was sent out to student journalists and radio broadcasters from other member schools across the conference. The Big West Coaches' Poll was released on October 16, 2025. This is the second consecutive year UC Irvine is predicted to win the Big West Conference.

Big West Preseason Media Poll
| Place | Team | Points |
|---|---|---|
| 1 | UC Irvine | 103 (6) |
| 2 | UC Santa Barbara | 98 (3) |
| 3 | UC San Diego | 93 (2) |
| 4 | Cal State Northridge | 60 |
| 5 | UC Riverside | 59 |
| 6 | Cal Poly | 51 |
| 7 | UC Davis | 50 |
| 8 | Hawai'i | 34 |
| 9 | Cal State Bakersfield | 26 |
| 10 | Long Beach State | 25 |
| 11 | Cal State Fullerton | 6 |

Big West Preseason Coaches' Poll
| Place | Team | Points |
|---|---|---|
| 1 | UC Irvine | 98 (8) |
| 2 | UC Santa Barbara | 93 (3) |
| 3 | Hawai'i | 76 |
| 4 | UC San Diego | 69 |
| 5 | Cal State Northridge | 63 |
| 6 | UC Davis | 58 |
| 7 | Cal Poly | 54 |
| 8 | Long Beach State | 31 |
| 9 | UC Riverside | 26 |
| 10 | Cal State Bakersfield | 20 |
| 11 | Cal State Fullerton | 17 |
(#) first-place votes

=== Departures ===
Five players from the 2024–25 roster departed Irvine, including three graduates and two transfers. Devin Tillis transferred to Virginia, while Myles Che transferred to UNLV.

Departures
| Name | Number | Pos. | Height | Weight | Year | Hometown | Reason for departure |
|---|---|---|---|---|---|---|---|
| Justin Hohn | 2 | G | 6'2" | 190 | Graduate | Sioux Falls, SD | Graduated |
| Ofure Ujadughele | 10 | G | 6'4" | 225 | Graduate | Long Beach, CA | Graduated |
| Devin Tillis | 11 | F | 6'7" | 225 | Redshirt Senior | Los Angeles, CA | Transferred to Virginia |
| Bent Leuchten | 15 | C | 7'1" | 260 | Senior | Karlsfeld, Germany | Graduated |
| Myles Che | 77 | G | 6'3" | 190 | Sophomore | Los Angeles, CA | Transferred to UNLV |

=== Incoming transfers ===
On May 21, 2025, UC Irvine announced the addition of Derin Saran to the roster, a guard from Istanbul, Turkey, transferring back to UC Irvine after one season with Stanford. On July 1, 2025, Irvine announced the addition of Harrison Carrington to the roster, a forward from Menlo Park, California, transferring after three seasons with Colorado.

Incoming transfers
| Name | Number | Pos. | Height | Weight | Year | Hometown | Previous School |
|---|---|---|---|---|---|---|---|
| Harrison Carrington | 2 | F | 6'7" | 207 | Redshirt Junior | Menlo Park, CA | Colorado |
| Derin Saran | 13 | G | 6'5" | 190 | Redshirt Sophomore | Istanbul, Turkey | Stanford |

=== Recruits ===
College recruiting information
| Name | Hometown | School | Height | Weight | Commit date |
|---|---|---|---|---|---|
| Bryce Goldman; G | Tarzana, CA | Chaminade College Prep | 6 ft 6 in (1.98 m) | 200 lb (91 kg) | Nov 13, 2024 |
| Bryce Goldman; G | Recruit ratings: No ratings found | | | | |
| Tamatoa Isaac; G | Christchurch, New Zealand | Christ's College High School | 6 ft 2 in (1.88 m) | 207 lb (94 kg) | May 20, 2025 |
| Tamatoa Isaac; G | Recruit ratings: No ratings found | | | | |
| Josh Palmer; G | Carson, CA | St. Bernard High School | 6 ft 4 in (1.93 m) | 160 lb (73 kg) | Aug 18, 2025 |
| Josh Palmer; G | Recruit ratings: No ratings found | | | | |
| Luke Isaak; G | Alamo, CA | San Ramon High School | 6 ft 3 in (1.91 m) | 190 lb (86 kg) | Nov 13, 2024 |
| Luke Isaak; G | Recruit ratings: No ratings found | | | | |
| Nes Emeneke; F | Yaoundé, Cameroon | Archbishop Riordan High School | 6 ft 10 in (2.08 m) | 225 lb (102 kg) | Nov 13, 2024 |
| Nes Emeneke; F | Recruit ratings: 247Sports: | | | | |
| Mason Hodges; F | San Juan Capistrano, CA | San Juan Hills High School | 6 ft 7 in (2.01 m) | 215 lb (98 kg) | Aug 18, 2025 |
| Mason Hodges; F | Recruit ratings: No ratings found | | | | |
Overall recruit ranking:
Note: In many cases, Scout, Rivals, 247Sports, On3, and ESPN may conflict in their listings of height and weight.; In these cases, the average was taken. ESPN grades are on a 100-point scale.; Sources:

== Roster ==
2025–26 UC Irvine Anteaters men's basketball team
Players
Coaches

| Pos. | # | Name | Height | Weight | Year | Previous school | Hometown |
|---|---|---|---|---|---|---|---|
| G | 0 | Bryce Goldman | 6 ft 6 in (1.98 m) | 200 lb (91 kg) | Fr | Chaminade College Prep | Tarzana, California |
| G | 1 | Torian Lee | 6 ft 0 in (1.83 m) | 165 lb (75 kg) | So | Orangeville Prep | Surrey, British Columbia, Canada |
| F | 2 | Harrison Carrington | 6 ft 7 in (2.01 m) | 207 lb (94 kg) | RS Jr | Colorado | Menlo Park, California |
| F/C | 3 | Elijah Chol | 7 ft 0 in (2.13 m) | 195 lb (88 kg) | RS Jr | Forsyth Central High School | Cumming, Georgia |
| F | 4 | Andre Henry | 6 ft 4 in (1.93 m) | 190 lb (86 kg) | GS | Saint Francis High School | La Cañada Flintridge, California |
| G | 5 | Ben Egbo | 6 ft 4 in (1.93 m) | 205 lb (93 kg) | RS So | Perry High School | Gilbert, Arizona |
| G | 6 | Tamatoa Isaac | 6 ft 2 in (1.88 m) | 207 lb (94 kg) | Fr | Christ's College High School | Christchurch, New Zealand |
| G | 7 | Josh Palmer | 6 ft 4 in (1.93 m) | 160 lb (73 kg) | Fr | St. Bernard High School | Carson, California |
| G | 8 | Luke Isaak | 6 ft 3 in (1.91 m) | 190 lb (86 kg) | Fr | San Ramon High School | Alamo, California |
| G | 9 | Jovan Jester Jr. | 6 ft 4 in (1.93 m) | 195 lb (88 kg) | RS Fr | Pasadena High School | Pasadena, California |
| G | 13 | Derin Saran | 6 ft 5 in (1.96 m) | 190 lb (86 kg) | RS So | Stanford | Istanbul, Turkey |
| F | 14 | Kyle Evans | 6 ft 10 in (2.08 m) | 210 lb (95 kg) | Sr | Colorado State | Aliso Viejo, California |
| G | 21 | Langston Redfield (W) | 6 ft 4 in (1.93 m) | 205 lb (93 kg) | GS | Capistrano Valley High School | Mission Viejo, California |
| F | 23 | Nes Emeneke | 6 ft 10 in (2.08 m) | 225 lb (102 kg) | Fr | Archbishop Riordan High School | Yaoundé, Cameroon |
| G | 24 | Jurian Dixon | 6 ft 4 in (1.93 m) | 195 lb (88 kg) | RS So | St. Augustine High School | San Diego, California |
| G | 27 | Tishan Ahir | 6 ft 0 in (1.83 m) | 150 lb (68 kg) | So | Crescenta Valley High School | La Cañada Flintridge, California |
| F | 43 | Akiva McBirney-Griffin | 6 ft 9 in (2.06 m) | 225 lb (102 kg) | RS Jr | St John's College, Hamilton | Hamilton, New Zealand |
| F | 55 | Mason Hodges | 6 ft 7 in (2.01 m) | 215 lb (98 kg) | Fr | San Juan Hills High School | San Juan Capistrano, California |

Head coach

- Russell Turner (Hampden–Sydney)

Assistant coach(es)

- Ali Ton (Davidson)
- Patrick Scully (Oregon)
- Julius Smith (Jessup)
- Nick Booker (Davidson)
- Brady Boznanski (Gonzaga)

Legend

- (C) Team captain
- (S) Suspended
- (I) Ineligible
- (W) Walk-on
- Injured
- Current redshirt

Roster

== Schedule and results ==
| Date time, TV | Rank^{#} | Opponent^{#} | Result | Record | High points | High rebounds | High assists | Site (attendance) city, state |
Exhibition
| October 12, 2025*; 12:00 pm, ESPN+ | | Arizona State | W 72–68 | – | 27 – Saran | 12 – Evans | 5 – Isaac | Bren Events Center (1,422); Irvine, CA |
| October 28, 2025*; 7:00 pm, B1G+ | | at No. 12 UCLA | L 64–94 | – | 15 – Saran | 4 – Evans | 4 – Saran | Pauley Pavilion (4,016); Los Angeles, CA |
Regular season
| November 3, 2025*; 7:00 pm, ESPN+ | | Bethesda | W 125–49 | 1–0 | 22 – Evans | 11 – Chol | 10 – Isaac | Bren Events Center (1,483); Irvine, CA |
| November 7, 2025*; 7:30 pm, ESPN+ | | California Baptist | L 61–69 | 1–1 | 16 – Tied | 8 – Saran | 4 – Tied | Bren Events Center (2,360); Irvine, CA |
| November 10, 2025*; 7:00 pm, ESPN+ | | Lincoln | W 130–63 | 2–1 | 20 – Saran | 12 – Saran | 10 – Saran | Bren Events Center (1,164); Irvine, CA |
| November 15, 2025*; 7:00 pm, ESPN+ | | Weber State | W 79–70 | 3–1 | 23 – Dixon | 9 – Isaac | 4 – McBirney-Griffin | Bren Events Center (1,964); Irvine, CA |
| November 19, 2025*; 5:00 pm, ESPN+ | | at Utah Valley; 2025 Cancun Challenge | L 72–79 | 3–2 | 18 – Dixon | 10 – Evans | 5 – Jester Jr. | UCCU Center (1,374); Orem, UT |
| November 22, 2025*; 7:30 pm, ESPN+ | | Northern Iowa | L 69–70 ^{OT} | 3–3 | 29 – Saran | 10 – Saran | 4 – Saran | Bren Events Center (1,618); Irvine, CA |
| November 25, 2025*; 5:30 pm, FloSports | | vs. New Mexico State; 2025 Cancun Challenge | L 45–57 | 3–4 | 16 – Saran | 6 – Evans | 2 – Saran | Hard Rock Hotel Riviera Maya; Cancún, Mexico |
| November 26, 2025*; 5:30 pm, FloSports | | vs. South Dakota State; 2025 Cancun Challenge | W 64–52 | 4–4 | 13 – Dixon | 10 – Evans | 3 – Saran | Hard Rock Hotel Riviera Maya (400); Cancún, Mexico |
| November 30, 2025*; 2:00 pm, ESPN+ | | at San José State | W 72–63 | 5–4 | 24 – Saran | 7 – Saran | 5 – Isaac | Provident Credit Union Event Center (1,382); San José, CA |
| December 4, 2025; 7:00 pm, ESPN+ | | UC Riverside; Big West Bold Week | W 73–60 | 6–4 (1–0) | 19 – Evans | 8 – Evans | 7 – Isaac | Bren Events Center (1,441); Irvine, CA |
| December 6, 2025; 7:00 pm, ESPN+ | | Cal State Northridge; Big West Bold Week | W 85–71 | 7–4 (2–0) | 17 – Saran | 16 – Evans | 3 – Saran | Bren Events Center (1,652); Irvine, CA |
| December 19, 2025*; 6:00 pm, ESPN+ | | Belmont | L 58–84 | 7–5 | 17 – Dixon | 7 – Evans | 5 – Isaac | Bren Events Center (1,853); Irvine, CA |
| December 21, 2025*; 4:00 pm, YouTube | | vs. North Dakota State; WestStar Don Haskins Sun Bowl Invitational Semifinal | W 74–73 | 8–5 | 24 – Evans | 9 – Evans | 6 – Isaac | Don Haskins Center (467); El Paso, TX |
| December 22, 2025*; 6:00 p.m., YouTube | | vs. Norfolk State; WestStar Don Haskins Sun Bowl Invitational Championship | W 89–70 | 9–5 | 22 – Evans | 8 – Evans | 9 – Saran | Don Haskins Center (2,816); El Paso, TX |
| January 1, 2026; 2:00 pm, ESPN+ | | at Cal State Bakersfield | W 81–77 | 10–5 (3–0) | 26 – Dixon | 11 – Evans | 6 – Isaac | Icardo Center (305); Bakersfield, CA |
| January 3, 2026; 4:00 pm, ESPN+ | | at Cal State Fullerton | W 86–64 | 11–5 (4–0) | 16 – Saran | 11 – Saran | 6 – Saran | Titan Gym (615); Fullerton, CA |
| January 8, 2026; 7:00 pm, ESPN+/SSN | | Long Beach State; Black and Blue Rivalry | W 74–64 | 12–5 (5–0) | 23 – Dixon | 7 – Saran | 3 – Dixon | Bren Events Center (2,354); Irvine, CA |
| January 10, 2026; 9:00 pm, ESPN+ | | at Hawai'i | L 66–67 | 12–6 (5–1) | 22 – Saran | 8 – Tied | 2 – Tied | Stan Sheriff Center (6,127); Honolulu, HI |
| January 17, 2026; 2:00 pm, ESPN+ | | at UC Davis | L 72–75 | 12–7 (5–2) | 16 – Dixon | 10 – Evans | 3 – Tied | University Credit Union Center (1,413); Davis, CA |
| January 22, 2026; 7:00 pm, ESPN+ | | at UC Riverside | W 80–66 | 13–7 (6–2) | 15 – Dixon | 15 – Evans | 5 – Jester Jr. | SRC Arena (647); Riverside, CA |
| January 24, 2026; 7:00 pm, ESPN+ | | at UC San Diego | W 61–59 | 14–7 (7–2) | 12 – Tied | 8 – Saran | 3 – Isaac | LionTree Arena (4,000); San Diego, CA |
| January 29, 2026; 8:00 pm, ESPNU | | Hawai'i | W 87–76 ^{OT} | 15–7 (8–2) | 19 – Tied | 11 – Evans | 7 – Isaac | Bren Events Center (2,873); Irvine, CA |
| February 5, 2026; 7:00 pm, ESPN+ | | Cal State Bakersfield | W 78–62 | 16–7 (9–2) | 16 – Evans | 8 – Carrington | 13 – Isaac | Bren Events Center (2,301); Irvine, CA |
| February 7, 2026; 7:00 pm, ESPNU | | at UC Santa Barbara | L 79–84 | 16–8 (9–3) | 18 – Henry | 7 – Dixon | 5 – Isaac | The Thunderdome (3,908); Santa Barbara, CA |
| February 12, 2026; 7:00 pm, ESPN+ | | at Cal Poly | L 73–79 | 16–9 (9–4) | 19 – Tied | 10 – Evans | 6 – Isaac | Mott Athletics Center (1,823); San Luis Obispo, CA |
| February 14, 2026; 7:00 pm, ESPN+ | | Cal State Fullerton | W 86–65 | 17–9 (10–4) | 19 – Henry | 11 – Evans | 8 – Isaac | Bren Events Center (1,991); Irvine, CA |
| February 19, 2026; 7:00 pm, ESPN+ | | at Long Beach State; Black and Blue Rivalry | W 69–58 | 18–9 (11–4) | 14 – Evans | 11 – Evans | 4 – Tied | Walter Pyramid (1,711); Long Beach, CA |
| February 21, 2026; 7:00 pm, ESPN+/SSN | | UC San Diego | L 69–71 | 18–10 (11–5) | 22 – Dixon | 12 – Evans | 4 – Tied | Bren Events Center (3,750); Irvine, CA |
| February 26, 2026; 7:00 pm, ESPN+ | | at Cal State Northridge | W 68–67 | 19–10 (12–5) | 14 – Dixon | 6 – Evans | 7 – Jester Jr. | Premier America Credit Union Arena (1,487); Northridge, CA |
| February 28, 2026; 7:30 pm, ESPN2 | | UC Santa Barbara; Homecoming | W 64–60 | 20–10 (13–5) | 13 – Tied | 6 – Tied | 2 – Tied | Bren Events Center (4,377); Irvine, CA |
| March 5, 2026; 7:00 pm, ESPN+ | | Cal Poly | W 107–85 | 21–10 (14–5) | 22 – Dixon | 8 – Evans | 5 – Tied | Bren Events Center (2,355); Irvine, CA |
| March 7, 2026; 5:00 pm, ESPNU | | UC Davis | W 79–69 ^{OT} | 22–10 (15–5) | 23 – Dixon | 8 – Dixon | 3 – Saran | Bren Events Center (2,963); Irvine, CA |
Big West tournament
| March 13, 2026; 6:00 pm, ESPNU | (1) | vs. (4) Cal State Northridge; Semifinals | W 93–78 | 23–10 | 23 – Saran | 9 – Saran | 7 – Dixon | Lee's Family Forum (2,060); Henderson, NV |
| March 14, 2026; 7:00 pm, ESPN2 | (1) | vs. (2) Hawai'i; Finals | L 64–71 | 23–11 | 17 – Dixon | 10 – Evans | 3 – Tied | Lee's Family Forum (3,488); Henderson, NV |
National Invitation Tournament (NIT)
| March 17, 2026; 8:00 pm, ESPNU | (4) | UNLV; First Round | L 72–75 | 23–12 | 18 – Saran | 13 – Evans | 6 – Saran | Bren Events Center (1,113); Irvine, CA |
*Non-conference game. ^{#}Rankings from AP Poll. (#) Tournament seedings in parentheses.

== Awards and honors ==
=== Regular season ===
Weekly honors
| Honors | Player | Position | Date awarded | Ref. |
|---|---|---|---|---|
| Lute Olson National Player of the Week | Kyle Evans | F | February 2, 2026 | |
