= 2025–26 Cal Poly Mustangs men's basketball team =

American college basketball season

2025–26 Cal Poly Mustangs men's basketball
- Conference: Big West Conference
- Record: 14–19 (10–10 Big West)
- Head coach: Mike DeGeorge (2nd season)
- Assistant coaches: Kyle Bossier; Jesse Pruitt; Sam Walters; BJ Andrews; Ron DuBois
- Home arena: Mott Athletics Center (Capacity: 3,032)

2025–26 Big West Conference men's basketball standings
| | Conf. | | | | Overall |
| Team | W | | L | PCT | W | | L | PCT |
|---|---|---|---|---|---|---|---|---|
| UC Irvine | 15 | – | 5 | .750 | 23 | – | 12 | .657 |
| Hawai'i † | 14 | – | 6 | .700 | 24 | – | 9 | .727 |
| Cal State Fullerton | 12 | – | 8 | .600 | 18 | – | 16 | .529 |
| Cal State Northridge | 12 | – | 8 | .600 | 20 | – | 14 | .588 |
| UC San Diego | 12 | – | 8 | .600 | 23 | – | 11 | .676 |
| UC Davis | 11 | – | 9 | .550 | 19 | – | 14 | .576 |
| UC Santa Barbara | 11 | – | 9 | .550 | 18 | – | 14 | .563 |
| Cal Poly | 10 | – | 10 | .500 | 14 | – | 19 | .424 |
| Long Beach State | 6 | – | 14 | .300 | 10 | – | 22 | .313 |
| UC Riverside | 5 | – | 15 | .250 | 10 | – | 22 | .313 |
| Cal State Bakersfield | 2 | – | 18 | .100 | 8 | – | 24 | .250 |
† 2026 Big West tournament winner

The 2025–26 Cal Poly Mustangs men's basketball team represented California Polytechnic State University, San Luis Obispo during the 2025–26 NCAA Division I men's basketball season. The Mustangs, led by second-year head coach Mike DeGeorge, played their home games at the Mott Athletics Center in San Luis Obispo, California as members of the Big West Conference.

== Previous season ==
The Mustangs finished the 2024–25 season 16–19, 8–12 in Big West play to finish in a tie for seventh place. They defeated UC Davis and UC Riverside before losing to UC Irvine in the semifinals of the Big West tournament.

== Preseason ==
On October 16, 2025, the Big West Conference released their preseason coaches poll. Cal Poly was picked to finish seventh in the conference.

=== Preseason rankings ===
Big West Preseason Poll
| Place | Team | Points |
|---|---|---|
| 1 | UC Irvine | 98 (8) |
| 2 | UC Santa Barbara | 93 (3) |
| 3 | Hawai'i | 76 |
| 4 | UC San Diego | 69 |
| 5 | Cal State Northridge | 63 |
| 6 | UC Davis | 58 |
| 7 | Cal Poly | 54 |
| 8 | Long Beach State | 31 |
| 9 | UC Riverside | 26 |
| 10 | Cal State Bakersfield | 20 |
| 11 | Cal State Fullerton | 17 |
(#) first-place votes

=== Preseason All-Big West Team ===
No players were named the Preseason All-Big West Team.

== Roster ==
2025–26 Cal Poly Mustangs men's basketball team
Players
Coaches

| Pos. | # | Name | Height | Weight | Year | Previous school | Hometown |
|---|---|---|---|---|---|---|---|
| G | 00 | Jason Scott | 6 ft 4 in (1.93 m) | 190 lb (86 kg) | Fr | Legacy the School of Sport Sciences | Houston, Texas |
| G | 1 | Jess Esso Essis | 6 ft 10 in (2.08 m) | 210 lb (95 kg) | Fr | ESSM Le Portel | Le Mans, France |
| F | 2 | Braden Freeman | 6 ft 6 in (1.98 m) | 200 lb (91 kg) | Fr | Moline High School | Moline, Illinois |
| G | 3 | Jake Davis | 6 ft 4 in (1.93 m) | 175 lb (79 kg) | Jr | West Valley College | Walnut Creek, California |
| G | 4 | Kieran Elliott | 6 ft 6 in (1.98 m) | 215 lb (98 kg) | Jr | West Texas A&M | Lubbock, Texas |
| G | 5 | Guzman Vasilic | 6 ft 4 in (1.93 m) | 200 lb (91 kg) | So | Southeastern Oklahoma | Montevideo, Uruguay |
| F | 7 | Ali Assran | 6 ft 9 in (2.06 m) | 210 lb (95 kg) | Fr | NBA Academy Africa | Cairo, Egypt |
| PG | 8 | Jackson Mosley | 5 ft 10 in (1.78 m) | 170 lb (77 kg) | Jr | Saint Francis High School | La Cañada, California |
| G | 9 | Peter Bandelj | 6 ft 4 in (1.93 m) | 210 lb (95 kg) | So | Royal Crown Academy | Ljubljana, Slovenia |
| G/F | 10 | Hamad Mousa | 6 ft 8 in (2.03 m) | 200 lb (91 kg) | So | Dayton | Doha, Qatar |
| F | 11 | Austin Goode | 6 ft 7 in (2.01 m) | 200 lb (91 kg) | Fr | Bella Vista Prep | Brampton, Ontario |
| F | 13 | Troy Plumtree | 6 ft 6 in (1.98 m) | 215 lb (98 kg) | Fr | Wellington College | Wellington, New Zealand |
| G | 14 | Cayden Ward | 6 ft 6 in (1.98 m) | 210 lb (95 kg) | So | St. Mary's High School | Stockton, California |
| PF | 15 | Aaron Price Jr. | 6 ft 8 in (2.03 m) | 225 lb (102 kg) | Sr | Liberty High School | Las Vegas, Nevada |
| G | 21 | Luka Tarlac | 6 ft 7 in (2.01 m) | 220 lb (100 kg) | Sr | Utah | Belgrade, Serbia |
| F | 22 | Eric Brown | 6 ft 8 in (2.03 m) | 225 lb (102 kg) | Jr | Mitty High School | Los Gatos, California |

Head coach

- Mike DeGeorge (Monmouth (IL))

Assistant coach(es)

- Kyle Bossier (LSU)
- Jesse Pruitt (UC Davis)
- Sam Walters (Colorado Mesa)
- BJ Andrews (Clarion)
- Ron DuBois (Arizona State)

Legend

- (C) Team captain
- (S) Suspended
- (I) Ineligible
- (W) Walk-on
- Injured
- Current redshirt

Roster
Last update: October 27, 2025

== Schedule and results ==
| Date time, TV | Rank^{#} | Opponent^{#} | Result | Record | High points | High rebounds | High assists | Site (attendance) city, state |
Exhibition
| October 24, 2025*; 11:00 am | | Cal State East Bay | W 97–86 | – | 25 – Mousa | 5 – Mousa | 8 – Bandelj | Mott Athletics Center (1,222); San Luis Obispo, CA |
Regular season
| November 3, 2025*; 6:30 pm, B1G+ | | at USC | L 64–94 | 0–1 | 13 – Assran | 8 – Assran | 6 – Bandelj | Galen Center (3,902); Los Angeles, CA |
| November 5, 2025*; 7:00 pm, ESPN+ | | Pacific Lutheran | W 101–79 | 1–1 | 26 – Ward | 12 – Mousa | 6 – Davis | Mott Athletics Center (709); San Luis Obispo, CA |
| November 8, 2025*; 7:00 pm, ESPN+ | | at Seattle | W 73–71 | 2–1 | 18 – Mousa | 8 – Mousa | 4 – Vasilic | Redhawk Center (999); Seattle, WA |
| November 12, 2025*; 6:00 pm, MW Network | | at Colorado State | L 79–93 | 2–2 | 18 – Mousa | 7 – Bandelj | 3 – Mousa | Moby Arena (5,908); Fort Collins, CO |
| November 14, 2025*; 6:00 pm, ESPN+ | | at Montana | L 82–90 | 2–3 | 21 – Bandelj | 12 – Assran | 3 – Elliott | Dahlberg Arena (2,827); Missoula, MT |
| November 20, 2025*; 6:00 pm, ESPN+ | | at Utah | W 92–85 | 3–3 | 28 – Ward | 8 – Tied | 5 – Bandelj | Jon M. Huntsman Center (6,163); Salt Lake City, UT |
| November 24, 2025*; 5:00 pm, ESPN+ | | at Northern Arizona; Northern Arizona MTE | L 87–93 | 3–4 | 20 – Bandelj | 8 – Tied | 6 – Davis | Rolle Activity Center (344); Flagstaff, AZ |
| November 25, 2025*; 5:00 p.m. | | vs. Southeast Missouri State; Northern Arizona MTE | L 68–84 | 3–5 | 15 – Ward | 7 – Bandelj | 2 – Bandelj | Rolle Activity Center (86); Flagstaff, AZ |
| November 29, 2025*; 4:00 pm, ESPN+ | | Redlands | W 87–81 | 4–5 | 21 – Bandelj | 9 – Bandelj | 9 – Bandelj | Mott Athletics Center (1,497); San Luis Obispo, CA |
| December 4, 2025; 7:00 pm, ESPN+ | | at Cal State Fullerton | W 94–91 | 5–5 (1–0) | 37 – Bandelj | 7 – Mousa | 6 – Tarlac | Titan Gym (919); Fullerton, CA |
| December 6, 2025; 4:00 pm, ESPN+ | | UC Riverside | L 84–88 | 5–6 (1–1) | 31 – Mousa | 9 – Mousa | 4 – Mousa | Mott Athletics Center (1,443); San Luis Obispo, CA |
| December 16, 2025*; 7:00 pm, ESPN+ | | Montana State | L 80–83 | 5–7 | 25 – Ward | 8 – Ward | 4 – Bandelj | Mott Athletics Center (1,234); San Luis Obispo, CA |
| December 19, 2025*; 7:00 pm, B1G+ | | at UCLA | L 87–108 | 5–8 | 21 – Ward | 7 – Ward | 4 – Tarlac | Pauley Pavilion (4,123); Los Angeles, CA |
| December 21, 2025*; 4:00 pm, ESPN+ | | Idaho | L 80–83 ^{OT} | 5–9 | 33 – Mousa | 10 – Tied | 2 – Bandelj | Mott Athletics Center (2,157); San Luis Obispo, CA |
| January 1, 2026; 7:00 pm, ESPN+ | | UC San Diego | W 67–65 | 6–9 (2–1) | 26 – Mousa | 11 – Ward | 3 – Davis | Mott Athletics Center (1,521); San Luis Obispo, CA |
| January 3, 2026; 6:00 pm, ESPN+ | | at Long Beach State | L 66–74 | 6–10 (2–2) | 19 – Mousa | 8 – Mousa | 4 – Ward | Walter Pyramid (1,182); Long Beach, CA |
| January 8, 2026; 7:00 pm, ESPN+ | | at Cal State Northridge | L 90–95 | 6–11 (2–3) | 34 – Mousa | 7 – Mousa | 4 – Davis | Premier America Credit Union Arena (625); Northridge, CA |
| January 10, 2026; 2:00 pm, ESPN+ | | UC Davis | W 84–78 | 7–11 (3–3) | 24 – Mousa | 10 – Mousa | 4 – Bandelj | Mott Athletics Center (2,483); San Luis Obispo, CA |
| January 15, 2026; 7:00 pm, ESPN+ | | Hawai'i | L 66–86 | 7–12 (3–4) | 17 – Mousa | 9 – Ward | 2 – Tied | Mott Athletics Center (2,612); San Luis Obispo, CA |
| January 22, 2026; 6:00 pm, ESPN+ | | at UC Santa Barbara; Rivalry | L 67–107 | 7–13 (3–5) | 11 – Davis | 5 – Davis | 4 – Tarlac | The Thunderdome (3,821); Santa Barbara, CA |
| January 24, 2026; 4:00 pm, ESPN+ | | Cal State Fullerton | L 78–93 | 7–14 (3–6) | 20 – Ward | 9 – Mousa | 5 – Mousa | Mott Athletics Center (2,318); San Luis Obispo, CA |
| January 29, 2026; 6:30 pm, ESPN+ | | at Cal State Bakersfield | W 104–79 | 8–14 (4–6) | 31 – Plumtree | 6 – Tied | 7 – Bandelj | Icardo Center (535); Bakersfield, CA |
| January 31, 2026; 5:00 pm, ESPN+ | | at UC Riverside | W 94–87 | 9–14 (5–6) | 26 – Mousa | 6 – Mousa | 6 – Bandelj | SRC Arena (276); Riverside, CA |
| February 5, 2026; 7:00 pm, ESPN+ | | Cal State Northridge | L 96–97 | 9–15 (5–7) | 32 – Hughes II | 12 – O'Garro | 12 – Davis | Mott Athletics Center (1,729); San Luis Obispo, CA |
| February 7, 2026; 2:00 pm, ESPN+ | | at UC Davis | L 58–67 | 9–16 (5–8) | 12 – Tied | 8 – Esso Essis | 3 – Bandelj | University Credit Union Center (1,521); Davis, CA |
| February 12, 2026; 7:00 pm, ESPN+ | | UC Irvine | W 79–73 | 10–16 (6–8) | 18 – Vasilic | 10 – Tied | 4 – Tied | Mott Athletics Center (1,823); San Luis Obispo, CA |
| February 14, 2026; 4:00 pm, ESPN+ | | UC Santa Barbara; Rivalry | W 89–79 | 11–16 (7–8) | 18 – Bandelj | 8 – Ward | 2 – Tied | Mott Athletics Center (2,870); San Luis Obispo, CA |
| February 19, 2026; 8:59 pm, ESPN+ | | at Hawai'i | W 86–75 | 12–16 (8–8) | 24 – Mousa | 9 – Mousa | 4 – Bandelj | Stan Sheriff Center (4,547); Honolulu, HI |
| February 26, 2026; 7:00 pm, ESPN+ | | Long Beach State | W 102–92 | 13–16 (9–8) | 29 – Mousa | 9 – Ward | 5 – Ward | Mott Athletics Center (1,692); San Luis Obispo, CA |
| February 28, 2026; 7:00 pm, ESPN+ | | at UC San Diego | L 64–80 | 13–17 (9–9) | 19 – Mousa | 10 – Ward | 3 – Tied | LionTree Arena (3,331); La Jolla, CA |
| March 5, 2026; 7:00 pm, ESPN+ | | at UC Irvine | L 85–107 | 13–18 (9–10) | 16 – Ward | 8 – Mousa | 3 – Tied | Bren Events Center (2,355); Irvine, CA |
| March 7, 2026; 4:00 pm, ESPN+ | | Cal State Bakersfield | W 108–76 | 14–18 (10–10) | 23 – Mousa | 9 – Ward | 8 – Bandelj | Mott Athletics Center (2,318); San Luis Obispo, CA |
Big West tournament
| March 11, 2026; 6:00 pm, ESPN+ | (8) | vs. (5) UC San Diego; First round | L 69–72 | 14–19 | 21 – Mousa | 9 – Ward | 4 – Ward | Lee's Family Forum (1,035); Henderson, NV |
*Non-conference game. ^{#}Rankings from AP Poll. (#) Tournament seedings in parentheses. All times are in Pacific.
