= Big West Conference Men's Basketball Coach of the Year =

College basketball award

Big West Coach of the Year
- Awarded for: the best coach in the Big West Conference.

History
- First award: 1978
- Most recent: Dedrique Taylor, Cal State Fullerton

The Big West Conference Men's Basketball Coach of the Year is an annual college basketball award presented to the top men's basketball coach in the Big West Conference.

== Winners ==
Season	Coach	School	Source(s)
Pacific Coast Athletic Association (1977–1988)
1977–78	Boyd Grant	Fresno State	
1978–79	Stan Morrison	Pacific	
1979–80	Bill Berry	San Jose State	
1979–80	Rod Tueller	Utah State	
1980–81	Boyd Grant (2)	Fresno State (2)	
1981–82	Boyd Grant (3)	Fresno State (3)	
1982–83	Jerry Tarkanian	UNLV	
1983–84	Jerry Tarkanian (2)	UNLV (2)	
1984–85	Jerry Tarkanian (3)	UNLV (3)	
1985–86	Bill Mulligan	UC Irvine	
1986–87	Jerry Tarkanian (4)	UNLV (4)	
1987–88	Jerry Tarkanian (5)	UNLV (5)	
Big West Conference (1988–present)
1988–89	Neil McCarthy	New Mexico State	
1989–90	Neil McCarthy (2)	New Mexico State (2)	
1990–91	Jerry Tarkanian (6)	UNLV (6)	
1991–92	Jerry Pimm	UC Santa Barbara	
1991–92	Jerry Tarkanian (7)	UNLV (7)	
1992–93	Bob Thomason	Pacific (2)	
1993–94	Stan Morrison (2)	San Jose State (2)	
1994–95	Larry Eustachy	Utah State (2)	
1995–96	Rod Baker	UC Irvine (2)	
1996–97	Bob Thomason (2)	Pacific (3)	
1997–98	Larry Eustachy (2)	Utah State (3)	
1998–99	Bob Williams	UC Santa Barbara (2)	
1999–2000	Stew Morrill	Utah State (4)	
2000–01	Pat Douglass	UC Irvine (3)	
2001–02	Stew Morrill (2)	Utah State (5)	
2002–03	Bob Williams (2)	UC Santa Barbara (3)	
2003–04	Bob Thomason (3)	Pacific (4)	
2004–05	Bob Thomason (4)	Pacific (5)	
2005–06	Bob Thomason (5)	Pacific (6)	
2006–07	Larry Reynolds	Long Beach State	
2007–08	Bobby Braswell	Cal State Northridge	
2008–09	Bobby Braswell (2)	Cal State Northridge (2)	
2009–10	Bob Williams (3)	UC Santa Barbara (4)	
2010–11	Dan Monson	Long Beach State (2)	
2011–12	Dan Monson (2)	Long Beach State (3)	
2012–13	Dan Monson (3)	Long Beach State (4)	
2013–14	Russell Turner	UC Irvine (4)	
2014–15	Jim Les	UC Davis	
2015–16	Eran Ganot	Hawaii	
2016–17	Russell Turner (2)	UC Irvine (5)	
2017–18	Jim Les (2)	UC Davis (2)	
2018–19	Russell Turner (3)	UC Irvine (6)	
2019–20	Russell Turner (4)	UC Irvine (7)	
2020–21	Joe Pasternack	UC Santa Barbara (5)	
2021–22	Dan Monson (4)	Long Beach State (5)	
2022–23	Mike Magpayo	UC Riverside	
2023–24	Eric Olen	UC San Diego	
2024–25	Eric Olen (2)	UC San Diego (2)	
2025–26	Dedrique Taylor	Cal State Fullerton	

== Winners by school ==
School	Winners	Years
UC Irvine	7	1986, 1996, 2001, 2014, 2017, 2019, 2020
UNLV (Note: UNLV left the Big West Conference in 1996 to join the Western Athletic Conference, and is currently a member of the Mountain West Conference.)	7	1983, 1984, 1985, 1987, 1988, 1991, 1992
Pacific (Note: Pacific left the Big West Conference in 2013 to join the West Coast Conference.)	6	1979, 1993, 1997, 2004, 2005, 2006
UC Santa Barbara	5	1992, 1999, 2003, 2010, 2021
Utah State (Note: Utah State left the Big West Conference in 2005 to join the Western Athletic Conference, and is currently a member of the Mountain West Conference.)	5	1980, 1995, 1998, 2000, 2002
Long Beach State	5	2007, 2011, 2012, 2013, 2022
Fresno State (Note: Fresno State left the Big West Conference in 1992 to join the Western Athletic Conference, and is currently a member of the Mountain West Conference.)	3	1978, 1981, 1982
Cal State Northridge	2	2008, 2009
New Mexico State (Note: New Mexico State left the Big West Conference in 2000 to join the Sun Belt Conference, and is currently a member of the Western Athletic Conference. NMSU will move to Conference USA in 2023.)	2	1989, 1990
San Jose State (Note: San Jose State left the Big West Conference in 1996 to join the Western Athletic Conference, and is currently a member of the Mountain West Conference.)	2	1980, 1994
UC San Diego	2	2024, 2025
Hawaii	1	2016
UC Riverside	1	2023
Cal State Fullerton	1	2026
