= 2025–26 UC Santa Barbara Gauchos men's basketball team =

American college basketball season

2025–26 UC Santa Barbara Gauchos men's basketball

Resorts World Las Vegas Classic champions
- Conference: Big West Conference
- Record: 18–14 (11–9 Big West)
- Head coach: Joe Pasternack (9th season)
- Assistant coaches: Brandon Cyrus; Brian Eskildsen; Derek Glasser; Brandon Rosenthal
- Home arena: The Thunderdome (Capacity: 5,000)

2025–26 Big West Conference men's basketball standings
	Conf.				Overall
Team	W		L	PCT	W		L	PCT
UC Irvine	15	–	5	.750	23	–	11	.676
Hawai'i †	14	–	6	.700	24	–	8	.750
Cal State Fullerton	12	–	8	.600	18	–	16	.529
Cal State Northridge	12	–	8	.600	20	–	14	.588
UC San Diego	12	–	8	.600	23	–	11	.676
UC Davis	11	–	9	.550	19	–	14	.576
UC Santa Barbara	11	–	9	.550	18	–	14	.563
Cal Poly	10	–	10	.500	14	–	19	.424
Long Beach State	6	–	14	.300	10	–	22	.313
UC Riverside	5	–	15	.250	10	–	22	.313
Cal State Bakersfield	2	–	18	.100	8	–	24	.250
† 2026 Big West tournament winner As of March 14, 2026

The 2025–26 UC Santa Barbara Gauchos men's basketball team represented the University of California, Santa Barbara during the 2025–26 NCAA Division I men's basketball season. The Gauchos, led by ninth-year head coach Joe Pasternack, played their home games at The Thunderdome in Santa Barbara, California as members of the Big West Conference.

== Previous season ==
The Gauchos finished the 2024–25 season 21–13, 11–9 in Big West play, to finish in fifth place. They defeated Cal State Bakersfield and Cal State Northridge, before falling to top-seeded and eventual tournament champions UC San Diego in the semifinals of the Big West tournament.

== Preseason ==
On October 16, 2025, the Big West Conference released their preseason coaches poll. UC Santa Barbara was picked to finish second in the conference, while also receiving three first-place votes.

=== Preseason rankings ===
Big West Preseason Poll
Place	Team	Points
1	UC Irvine	98 (8)
2	UC Santa Barbara	93 (3)
3	Hawai'i	76
4	UC San Diego	69
5	Cal State Northridge	63
6	UC Davis	58
7	Cal Poly	54
8	Long Beach State	31
9	UC Riverside	26
10	Cal State Bakersfield	20
11	Cal State Fullerton	17
(#) first-place votes

=== Preseason All-Big West Team ===
Preseason All-Big West Team
Player	Year	Position
Jason Fontenet II	Junior	Guard
Aidan Mahaney	Senior	Guard

== Roster ==
2025–26 UC Santa Barbara Gauchos men's basketball team
Players
Coaches

Pos.	#	Name	Height	Weight	Year	Previous school	Hometown
F	00	Koat Keat Tong	6 ft 10 in (2.08 m)	220 lb (100 kg)	RS Jr	Crean Lutheran High School	Bentiu, South Sudan
G	1	Miro Little	6 ft 3 in (1.91 m)	195 lb (88 kg)	Jr	Utah	Tampere, Finland
G	2	Luke Zuffelato	6 ft 5 in (1.96 m)	200 lb (91 kg)	Fr	Santa Barbara High School	Santa Barbara, California
G	3	CJ Shaw	6 ft 5 in (1.96 m)	190 lb (86 kg)	Fr	Mojave High School	Las Vegas, Nevada
G	4	Marvin McGhee IV	6 ft 7 in (2.01 m)	200 lb (91 kg)	Jr	Cal State Bakersfield	Atlanta, Georgia
F	6	Kyle Haughy	6 ft 6 in (1.98 m)	210 lb (95 kg)	RS Jr	Santa Barbara City College	San Ramon, California
F	7	Colin Smith	6 ft 8 in (2.03 m)	220 lb (100 kg)	RS Jr	Vanderbilt	Dallas, Texas
G	10	Jason Fontenet II	6 ft 6 in (1.98 m)	205 lb (93 kg)	Jr	Bella Vista Prep	Phoenix, Arizona
C	12	Evans Kipruto	6 ft 8 in (2.03 m)	240 lb (109 kg)	GS	Barton Community College	Nairobi, Kenya
G	18	Isaac Shingange	6 ft 5 in (1.96 m)	185 lb (84 kg)	RS Jr	City College of San Francisco	Johannesburg, South Africa
G	20	Aidan Mahaney	6 ft 3 in (1.91 m)	185 lb (84 kg)	Sr	UConn	Lafayette, California
F	21	John Simcoe	6 ft 5 in (1.96 m)	200 lb (91 kg)	Fr	Sandra Day O'Connor High School	Phoenix, Arizona
F	23	Michael Simcoe	6 ft 8 in (2.03 m)	225 lb (102 kg)	Fr	Sandra Day O'Connor High School	Phoenix, Arizona
G	24	Zion Sensley	6 ft 8 in (2.03 m)	210 lb (95 kg)	So	Archbishop Riordan High School	San Carlos, California
F	34	Hosana Kitenge	6 ft 8 in (2.03 m)	235 lb (107 kg)	GS	Louisiana	Crawley, England
F	35	Bryce Bedgood	6 ft 11 in (2.11 m)	210 lb (95 kg)	RS Fr	Valencia High School	Valencia, California
G	44	Zachiah Clark	6 ft 2 in (1.88 m)	205 lb (93 kg)	RS Fr	DNA Prep Academy	Los Angeles, California

Head coach

- Joe Pasternack (Indiana)

Assistant coach(es)

- Brandon Cyrus (UC Santa Barbara)
- Brian Eskildsen (Tennessee)
- Derek Glasser (Arizona State)
- Brandon Rosenthal (St. John Fisher)

Legend

- (C) Team captain
- (S) Suspended
- (I) Ineligible
- (W) Walk-on
- Injured
- Current redshirt

Roster
Last update: October 28, 2025

== Schedule and results ==
Date time, TV	Rank^{#}	Opponent^{#}	Result	Record	High points	High rebounds	High assists	Site (attendance) city, state
Regular season
November 4, 2025*; 6:00 pm, ESPN+		San Francisco State	W 98–67	1–0	23 – Sensley	14 – Sensley	3 – Tied	The Thunderdome (2,992); Santa Barbara, CA
November 8, 2025*; 1:00 pm, ESPN+		San Jose State	W 85–74	2–0	24 – Smith	8 – Little	6 – Tied	The Thunderdome (3,024); Santa Barbara, CA
November 11, 2025*; 7:00 pm, ESPN+		at Sacramento State	W 92–87	3–0	17 – 3 tied	7 – 3 tied	8 – Little	Hornets Nest (2,734); Sacramento, CA
November 17, 2025*; 6:00 pm, ESPN+		Loyola Marymount	L 74–78 ^{OT}	3–1	19 – Little	8 – Tied	4 – Mahaney	The Thunderdome (2,402); Santa Barbara, CA
November 22, 2025*; 2:00 pm, MW Network		at Nevada	L 64–77	3–2	13 – Little	6 – Little	4 – Tied	Lawlor Events Center (7,340); Reno, NV
November 24, 2025*; 6:00 pm, ESPN+		Nobel	W 84–49	4–2	23 – Shaw	12 – Sensley	5 – Simcoe	The Thunderdome (1,311); Santa Barbara, CA
November 28, 2025*; 1:30 pm, FloCollege		vs. Lehigh; Resorts World Las Vegas Classic semifinals	W 72–70	5–2	20 – Little	8 – Tied	2 – Little	Resorts World Events Center; Winchester, NV
November 29, 2025*; 1:30 pm, FloCollege		vs. Seattle; Resorts World Las Vegas Classic championship	W 74–71	6–2	20 – Sensley	6 – Tied	6 – Little	Resorts World Events Center; Winchester, NV
December 4, 2025; 6:00 pm, ESPN+		Long Beach State	W 84–77 ^{OT}	7–2 (1–0)	26 – Mahaney	6 – Tied	3 – Mahaney	The Thunderdome (2,072); Santa Barbara, CA
December 6, 2025; 6:00 pm, ESPN+		Cal State Bakersfield	W 109–84	8–2 (2–0)	30 – Mahaney	14 – Sensley	6 – McGhee IV	The Thunderdome (1,739); Santa Barbara, CA
December 13, 2025*; 11:00 am, ESPN+		vs. Utah Valley; Salt Lake Slam	L 53–68	8–3	10 – Smith	10 – Sensley	4 – Shaw	Delta Center (1,987); Salt Lake City, UT
December 17, 2025*; 4:00 pm, ESPN+		at Green Bay	L 64–67	8–4	18 – Mahaney	10 – McGhee IV	4 – Mahaney	Kress Events Center (1,510); Green Bay, WI
December 22, 2025*; 2:00 pm, ESPN+		Portland	W 79–61	9–4	15 – Mahaney	8 – Kipruto	11 – Shaw	The Thunderdome (3,022); Santa Barbara, CA
January 1, 2026; 7:00 pm, ESPN+		at Cal State Fullerton	L 84–95	9–5 (2–1)	23 – Mahaney	11 – Sensley	6 – Kitenge	Titan Gym (493); Fullerton, CA
January 3, 2026; 1:00 pm, ESPN+/SSN		at Cal State Northridge	L 65–74	9–6 (2–2)	20 – Shaw	7 – Sensley	3 – McGhee IV	Premier America Credit Union Arena (689); Northridge, CA
January 8, 2026; 6:00 pm, ESPN+		UC Davis	L 86–93	9–7 (2–3)	20 – Little	7 – Smith	5 – Little	The Thunderdome (2,091); Santa Barbara, CA
January 15, 2026; 6:30 pm, ESPN+		at Cal State Bakersfield	W 75–69	10–7 (3–3)	16 – Smith	8 – Sensley	4 – Little	Icardo Center (284); Bakersfield, CA
January 17, 2026; 6:00 pm, ESPN+		Hawai'i	W 77–62	11–7 (4–3)	17 – Mahaney	5 – Tied	4 – Mahaney	The Thunderdome (2,589); Santa Barbara, CA
January 22, 2026; 6:00 pm, ESPN+		Cal Poly; Rivalry	W 107–67	12–7 (5–3)	20 – Sensley	7 – Sensley	11 – Little	The Thunderdome (3,821); Santa Barbara, CA
January 24, 2026; 4:00 pm, ESPN+		at Long Beach State	W 74–71	13–7 (6–3)	21 – Mahaney	8 – Little	6 – Little	Walter Pyramid (2,351); Long Beach, CA
January 29, 2026; 7:00 pm, ESPN+		at UC San Diego	W 62–48	14–7 (7–3)	15 – Little	8 – Little	3 – Mahaney	LionTree Arena (3,704); La Jolla, CA
January 31, 2026; 6:00 pm, ESPN+		Cal State Fullerton	W 83–69	15–7 (8–3)	17 – Shaw	10 – Sensley	6 – Little	The Thunderdome (2,584); Santa Barbara, CA
February 5, 2026; 6:00 pm, ESPN+		at UC Davis	L 75–85	15–8 (8–4)	18 – Shaw	9 – Tied	5 – Mahaney	University Credit Union Center (1,811); Davis, CA
February 7, 2026; 7:00 pm, ESPNU		UC Irvine	W 84–79	16–8 (9–4)	21 – Mahaney	13 – Sensley	3 – Tied	The Thunderdome (3,908); Santa Barbara, CA
February 12, 2026; 7:00 pm, ESPN+		at UC Riverside	W 76–68	17–8 (10–4)	20 – Mahaney	8 – Sensley	5 – Shaw	SRC Arena (367); Riverside, CA
February 14, 2026; 4:00 pm, ESPN+/SSN		at Cal Poly; Rivalry	L 79–89	17–9 (10–5)	21 – Sensley	9 – Sensley	3 – Tied	Mott Athletics Center (2,870); San Luis Obispo, CA
February 19, 2026; 6:00 pm, ESPN+		Cal State Northridge	L 83–85 ^{OT}	17–10 (10–6)	22 – Shaw	11 – Tied	5 – Shaw	The Thunderdome (2,313); Santa Barbara, CA
February 21, 2026; 7:00 pm, ESPNU		at Hawai'i	L 75–78 ^{OT}	17–11 (10–7)	19 – Smith	11 – McGhee IV	5 – Mahaney	Stan Sheriff Center (9,246); Honolulu, HI
February 26, 2026; 6:00 pm, ESPN+		UC Riverside	W 70–59	18–11 (11–7)	21 – Mahaney	12 – Sensley	3 – Tied	The Thunderdome (2,026); Santa Barbara, CA
February 28, 2026; 7:30 pm, ESPN2		at UC Irvine	L 60–64	18–12 (11–8)	16 – Smith	8 – Kitenge	5 – Shaw	Bren Events Center (4,377); Irvine, CA
March 7, 2026; 6:00 pm, ESPN+		UC San Diego	L 63–64	18–13 (11–9)	13 – Tied	8 – Little	7 – Little	The Thunderdome (3,899); Santa Barbara, CA
Big West tournament
March 11, 2026; 8:30 pm, ESPN+	(7)	vs. (6) UC Davis; First round	L 73–79	18–14	20 – Shaw	7 – Little	3 – Little	Lee's Family Forum (1,035); Henderson, NV
*Non-conference game. ^{#}Rankings from AP Poll. (#) Tournament seedings in parentheses. All times are in Pacific.
