= 2025–26 Cal State Northridge Matadors men's basketball team =

American college basketball season

2025–26 Cal State Northridge Matadors men's basketball
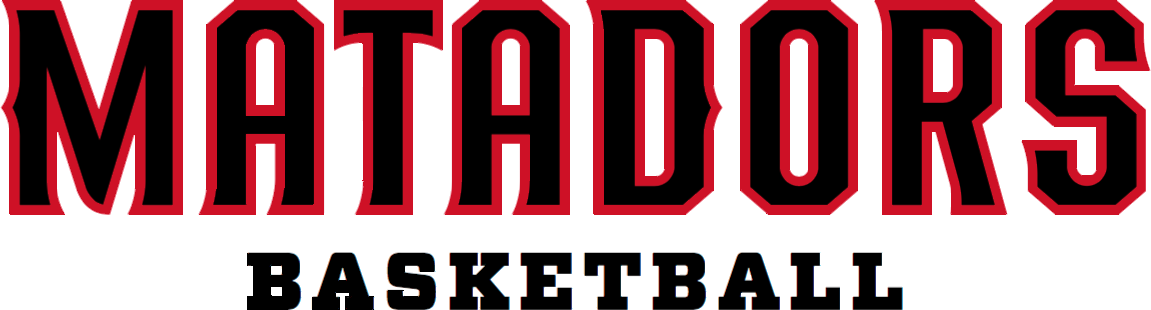
- Conference: Big West Conference
- Record: 20–14 (12–8 Big West)
- Head coach: Andy Newman (3rd season)
- Assistant coaches: Scott Cutley; CJ Killin; Brandon Shingles
- Home arena: Premier America Credit Union Arena

2025–26 Big West Conference men's basketball standings
	Conf.				Overall
Team	W		L	PCT	W		L	PCT
UC Irvine	15	–	5	.750	23	–	12	.657
Hawai'i †	14	–	6	.700	24	–	9	.727
Cal State Fullerton	12	–	8	.600	18	–	16	.529
Cal State Northridge	12	–	8	.600	20	–	14	.588
UC San Diego	12	–	8	.600	23	–	11	.676
UC Davis	11	–	9	.550	19	–	14	.576
UC Santa Barbara	11	–	9	.550	18	–	14	.563
Cal Poly	10	–	10	.500	14	–	19	.424
Long Beach State	6	–	14	.300	10	–	22	.313
UC Riverside	5	–	15	.250	10	–	22	.313
Cal State Bakersfield	2	–	18	.100	8	–	24	.250
† 2026 Big West tournament winner

The 2025–26 Cal State Northridge Matadors men's basketball team represented California State University, Northridge during the 2025–26 NCAA Division I men's basketball season. The Matadors, led by third-year head coach Andy Newman, played their home games at the Premier America Credit Union Arena in Northridge, California as members of the Big West Conference.

== Previous season ==
The Matadors finished the 2024–25 season 22–11, 14–6 in Big West play, to finish in a tie for third place. They were defeated by UC Santa Barbara in the quarterfinals of the Big West tournament. They received an invitation to the NIT, where they would be defeated by Stanford in the first round.

== Preseason ==
On October 16, 2025, the Big West Conference released their preseason coaches poll. Cal State Northridge was picked to finish fifth in the conference.

=== Preseason rankings ===
Big West Preseason Poll
Place	Team	Points
1	UC Irvine	98 (8)
2	UC Santa Barbara	93 (3)
3	Hawai'i	76
4	UC San Diego	69
5	Cal State Northridge	63
6	UC Davis	58
7	Cal Poly	54
8	Long Beach State	31
9	UC Riverside	26
10	Cal State Bakersfield	20
11	Cal State Fullerton	17
(#) first-place votes

=== Preseason All-Big West Team ===
Preseason All-Big West Team
Player	Year	Position
Mahmoud Fofana	Senior	Forward

== Roster ==
2025–26 Cal State Northridge Matadors men's basketball team
Players
Coaches

Pos.	#	Name	Height	Weight	Year	Previous school	Hometown
F	1	Davius Loury	6 ft 7 in (2.01 m)	205 lb (93 kg)	So	John A. Logan College	Chicago, Illinois
G	2	Larry Hughes II	6 ft 4 in (1.93 m)	185 lb (84 kg)	Sr	Saint Louis	St. Louis, Missouri
G	3	Jalen Barbee	6 ft 6 in (1.98 m)	205 lb (93 kg)	Sr	Cochise College	Tacoma, Washington
G	4	Josiah Davis	6 ft 3 in (1.91 m)	195 lb (88 kg)	Sr	Niagara	Kitchener, Ontario
G	5	James Evans Jr.	6 ft 6 in (1.98 m)	205 lb (93 kg)	RS Fr	UNLV	Wichita, Kansas
G	6	Joseph Barrio	6 ft 1 in (1.85 m)	180 lb (82 kg)	Jr	Mira Costa High School	Hermosa Beach, California
G	7	Joshua O'Garro	6 ft 6 in (1.98 m)	175 lb (79 kg)	Sr	Texas State	George Town, Cayman Islands
G/F	8	Max Rehl	6 ft 6 in (1.98 m)	200 lb (91 kg)	Fr	Notre Dame Prep	Phoenix, Arizona
F	11	Mahmoud Fofana	6 ft 6 in (1.98 m)	195 lb (88 kg)	Sr	Cal State San Bernardino	San Jose, California
C	13	Aleks Szymczyk	6 ft 10 in (2.08 m)	250 lb (113 kg)	Jr	Charlotte	Frankfurt, Germany
G	14	Omer Dahan	6 ft 0 in (1.83 m)	165 lb (75 kg)	Fr	SoCal Academy	Los Angeles, California
G	15	Jai Chisolm	6 ft 3 in (1.91 m)	190 lb (86 kg)	Jr	USC Salkehatchie	Summerville, South Carolina
G	20	Robert Thibiant	6 ft 2 in (1.88 m)	185 lb (84 kg)	Sr	Sierra Canyon School	Chatsworth, California
F	21	Grady Lewis	6 ft 9 in (2.06 m)	225 lb (102 kg)	Sr	Cal State East Bay	Phoenix, Arizona
G	23	Jordan Brinson	6 ft 2 in (1.88 m)	170 lb (77 kg)	GS	Fresno State	Inglewood, California
G	24	Greg Gazarian	6 ft 0 in (1.83 m)	175 lb (79 kg)	RS Fr	Saint Francis High School	La Cañada Flintridge, California
G	32	Quinton Webb	6 ft 6 in (1.98 m)	205 lb (93 kg)	Jr	New Mexico	San Bernardino, California

Head coach

- Andy Newman (Azusa Pacific)

Assistant coach(es)

- Scott Cutley (Cal State Fullerton)
- CJ Killin (Nebraska–Kearney)
- Brandon Shingles (Morehead State)

Legend

- (C) Team captain
- (S) Suspended
- (I) Ineligible
- (W) Walk-on
- Injured
- Current redshirt

Roster
Last update: October 28, 2025

== Schedule and results ==
Date time, TV	Rank^{#}	Opponent^{#}	Result	Record	High points	High rebounds	High assists	Site (attendance) city, state
Regular season
November 3, 2025*; 7:00 pm, ESPN+		Nobel	W 99–58	1–0	20 – O'Garro	16 – Szymczyk	8 – Davis	Premier America Credit Union Arena (725); Northridge, CA
November 6, 2025*; 5:00 pm, ESPN+		at Northern Iowa	L 57–86	1–1	21 – Hughes II	9 – Fofana	6 – Davis	McLeod Center (3,173); Cedar Falls, IA
November 9, 2025*; 11:00 am, SLN		at North Dakota	W 93–85	2–1	25 – Davis	14 – O'Garro	6 – Davis	Betty Engelstad Sioux Center (1,479); Grand Forks, ND
November 11, 2025*; 5:00 pm, SLN		at North Dakota State	L 68–90	2–2	18 – Hughes II	8 – Szymczyk	3 – Davis	Scheels Center (1,005); Fargo, ND
November 16, 2025*; 5:00 pm, ESPN+		Troy	W 94–85	3–2	23 – O'Garro	11 – O'Garro	5 – Davis	Premier America Credit Union Arena (659); Northridge, CA
November 26, 2025*; 6:00 pm, ESPN+		vs. Idaho; Holiday Hoops Classic	L 54–78	3–3	17 – Hughes II	13 – O'Garro	5 – Davis	Idaho Central Arena; Boise, ID
November 28, 2025*; 3:30 pm, ESPN+		vs. Idaho State; Holiday Hoops Classic	L 50–82	3–4	15 – Chisolm	6 – Tied	4 – Davis	Idaho Central Arena; Boise, ID
December 4, 2025; 7:00 pm, ESPN+		Cal State Bakersfield	W 87–66	4–4 (1–0)	27 – Hughes II	9 – O'Garro	8 – Davis	Premier America Credit Union Arena (715); Northridge, CA
December 6, 2025; 7:00 pm, ESPN+		at UC Irvine	L 71–85	4–5 (1–1)	18 – Hughes II	11 – Fofana	10 – Davis	Bren Events Center (1,652); Irvine, CA
December 10, 2025*; 7:00 pm, ESPN+		Fresno State	W 89–87	5–5	25 – Hughes II	11 – O'Garro	8 – Davis	Premier America Credit Union Arena (756); Northridge, CA
December 13, 2025*; 10:00 am, ESPN+		at Delaware	W 88–66	6–5	23 – Hughes II	8 – O'Garro	6 – Brinson	Bob Carpenter Center (1,517); Newark, DE
December 19, 2025*; 3:00 pm, ESPN+		La Sierra	W 88–53	7–5	17 – Loury	8 – Tied	4 – Tied	Premier America Credit Union Arena (603); Northridge, CA
December 22, 2025*; 7:00 pm, ESPN+		Sacramento State	W 100–88	8–5	22 – Davis	11 – O'Garro	10 – Davis	Premier America Credit Union Arena (1,080); Northridge, CA
December 27, 2025*; 5:00 pm, ACCNX		at Stanford	L 80–88	8–6	26 – Hughes II	7 – Fofana	6 – Davis	Maples Pavilion (3,033); Stanford, CA
January 1, 2026; 6:00 pm, ESPN+		at UC Davis	L 80–89	8–7 (1–2)	21 – Davis	7 – Tied	5 – Tied	University Credit Union Center (923); Davis, CA
January 3, 2026; 1:00 pm, ESPN+/SSN		UC Santa Barbara	W 74–65	9–7 (2–2)	23 – Hughes II	11 – Fofana	4 – Davis	Premier America Credit Union Arena (689); Northridge, CA
January 8, 2026; 7:00 pm, ESPN+		Cal Poly	W 95–90	10–7 (3–2)	23 – Davis	11 – O'Garro	15 – Davis	Premier America Credit Union Arena (625); Northridge, CA
January 10, 2026; 4:00 pm, ESPN+		at Cal State Fullerton	L 79–86	10–8 (3–3)	28 – O'Garro	13 – O'Garro	6 – O'Garro	Titan Gym (486); Fullerton, CA
January 15, 2026; 7:00 pm, ESPN+		at UC San Diego	W 84–79	11–8 (4–3)	23 – Davis	17 – Fofana	7 – Davis	LionTree Arena (3,117); La Jolla, CA
January 17, 2026; 5:00 pm, ESPN+		Long Beach State	L 80-87	11–9 (4–4)	21 – Hughes II	14 – O'Garro	10 – Davis	Premier America Credit Union Arena (702); Northridge, CA
January 24, 2026; 9:00 pm, ESPN+		at Hawai'i	L 68–89	11–10 (4–5)	19 – Hughes II	11 – O'Garro	8 – Davis	Stan Sheriff Center (6,025); Honolulu, HI
January 29, 2026; 7:00 pm, ESPN+		UC Davis	W 94–78	12–10 (5–5)	22 – Fofana	10 – Tied	15 – Davis	Premier America Credit Union Arena (625); Northridge, CA
January 31, 2026; 5:00 pm, ESPN+		UC San Diego	W 81–64	13–10 (6–5)	22 – Fofana	10 – Fofana	10 – Davis	Premier America Credit Union Arena (715); Northridge, CA
February 5, 2026; 7:00 pm, ESPN+		at Cal Poly	W 97–96	14–10 (7–5)	32 – Hughes II	12 – O'Garro	12 – Davis	Mott Athletics Center (1,729); San Luis Obispo, CA
February 7, 2026; 1:00 pm, ESPN+/SSN		UC Riverside	W 88–74	15–10 (8–5)	18 – Hughes II	8 – Fofana	8 – Davis	Premier America Credit Union Arena (863); Northridge, CA
February 14, 2026; 5:00 pm, ESPN+		Hawai'i	W 84–60	16–10 (9–5)	27 – Hughes II	8 – O'Garro	5 – Davis	Premier America Credit Union Arena (445); Northridge, CA
February 19, 2026; 6:00 pm, ESPN+		at UC Santa Barbara	W 85–83 ^{OT}	17–10 (10–5)	31 – Davis	14 – Tied	7 – Davis	The Thunderdome (2,313); Santa Barbara, CA
February 21, 2026; 6:00 pm, ESPN+		at Long Beach State	W 78–76	18–10 (11–5)	21 – Davis	9 – Fofana	9 – Davis	Walter Pyramid (1,551); Long Beach, CA
February 26, 2026; 7:00 pm, ESPN+		UC Irvine	L 67–68	18–11 (11–6)	17 – O'Garro	10 – O'Garro	6 – Davis	Premier America Credit Union Arena (1,487); Northridge, CA
February 28, 2026; 5:00 pm, ESPN+		at UC Riverside	L 84–95	18–12 (11–7)	38 – Davis	10 – Fofana	8 – Davis	SRC Arena (346); Riverside, CA
March 5, 2026; 6:30 pm, ESPN+		at Cal State Bakersfield	W 86–84	19–12 (12–7)	25 – O'Garro	11 – O'Garro	6 – Davis	Icardo Center (356); Bakersfield, CA
March 7, 2026; 5:00 pm, ESPN+		Cal State Fullerton	L 77–90	19–13 (12–8)	21 – Tied	8 – Tied	13 – Davis	Premier America Credit Union Arena; Northridge, CA
Big West tournament
March 12, 2026; 6:00 p.m., ESPN+	(4)	vs. (5) UC San Diego; Quarterfinals	W 80–70	20–13	34 – Hughes II	12 – Fofana	9 – Davis	Lee's Family Forum (1,030); Henderson, NV
March 13, 2026; 6:00 p.m., ESPNU	(4)	vs. (1) UC Irvine; Semifinals	L 78–93	20–14	26 – Davis	5 – Tied	8 – Davis	Lee's Family Forum (2,060); Henderson, NV
*Non-conference game. ^{#}Rankings from AP Poll. (#) Tournament seedings in parentheses. All times are in Pacific.
