= Jake Hall (basketball) =

American basketball player

No. 23 – New Mexico Lobos
- Position: Shooting guard
- League: Mountain West Conference

Personal information
- Born: Carlsbad, California, U.S.
- Listed height: 6 ft 4 in (1.93 m)
- Listed weight: 200 lb (91 kg)

Career information
- High school: Carlsbad (Carlsbad, California)
- College: New Mexico (2025–present)

Career highlights
- First-team All-Mountain West (2026); Mountain West Freshman of the Year (2026)

Jake Hall is an American college basketball player for the New Mexico Lobos of the Mountain West Conference.

== Early life ==
Hall was born in San Diego, CA. Hall attended Carlsbad High School in Carlsbad, California. During his high school career, he won the 2022 D1 CIF-SDS Championship as well as the 2024 CIF-SDS Open Division Championship. As a senior, he averaged 28.5 points per game, finishing his career with 3,106 points. As a result of his performance, Hall was nominated for the McDonald’s All-American Game. Following his high school career, he committed to play college basketball at the University of New Mexico.

== College career ==
Hall made an immediate impact as a true freshman, leading the team in scoring with an average of 16.4 points per game and helping guide the Lobos to the National Invitation Tournament semifinals. Against Fresno State on February 22, 2026, he made a game-winning jumper in the final minute of a comeback victory. On March 7, Hall recorded a freshman single-game program record with 32 points against Utah State. At the conclusion of the season, he was named Mountain West Freshman of the Year, after becoming the third player in program history to receive the honor. He was also selected to the All-Mountain West First Team, one of just three freshmen in conference history to earn first-team recognition and received NABC All-District First Team honors. Following the conclusion of the season, Hall entered the transfer portal. However, on April 16, he announced his decision to return to New Mexico for his sophomore year.

== Personal life ==
Hall's brother, Dax, also plays basketball at New Mexico.
