= 2026–27 Hawaii Rainbow Warriors basketball team =

American college basketball season

2026–27 Hawaii Rainbow Warriors basketball
- Conference: Mountain West Conference
- Record: 3–2 (0–0 MW)
- Head coach: Eran Ganot (12th season)
- Associate head coach: Gibson Johnson (1st, 3rd overall season)
- Assistant coaches: John Montgomery (10th overall, 1st straight season); Adam Jacobsen (6th overall, 1st straight season); Noah Allen (1st season); Cody Kelley (2nd overall, 1st straight season)
- Home arena: Stan Sheriff Center (Capacity: 10,300)

2026–27 Mountain West Conference men's basketball standings
| | Conf. | | | | Overall |
| Team | W | | L | PCT | W | | L | PCT |
|---|---|---|---|---|---|---|---|---|
| Grand Canyon | 0 | – | 0 | – | 4 | – | 0 | 1.000 |
| Wyoming | 0 | – | 0 | – | 4 | – | 1 | .800 |
| New Mexico | 0 | – | 0 | – | 3 | – | 1 | .750 |
| UTEP | 0 | – | 0 | – | 3 | – | 1 | .750 |
| Air Force | 0 | – | 0 | – | 3 | – | 2 | .600 |
| Hawaii | 0 | – | 0 | – | 3 | – | 2 | .600 |
| Nevada | 0 | – | 0 | – | 3 | – | 2 | .600 |
| San Jose State | 0 | – | 0 | – | 3 | – | 2 | .600 |
| UC Davis | 0 | – | 0 | – | 3 | – | 2 | .600 |
| UNLV | 0 | – | 0 | – | 3 | – | 2 | .600 |
† 2027 Mountain West tournament winner As of November 19, 2026; Rankings from AP poll

The 2026–27 Hawaii Rainbow Warriors basketball team will represent the University of Hawaiʻi at Mānoa during the 2026–27 NCAA Division I men's basketball season. The Rainbow Warriors will be led by twelfth-year head coach Eran Ganot and will play their home games at the Stan Sheriff Center in Honolulu, Hawaii as a member of the Mountain West Conference. This will mark Hawaii's first season as members of the Mountain West Conference after spending the previous fourteen seasons as members of the Big West Conference.

== Previous season ==
Hawaii finished the 2025-26 season 24–9, 14–6 in the Big West Conference to finish second in the conference. As the 2-seed in the Big West Tournament, they would defeat 3-seed Cal State Fullerton in the Semifinal to advance to the Finals against 1-seed UC Irvine. The Rainbow Warriors defeated the Anteaters 71-65 to win claim the tournament championship. As a result, they received the conference's autobid to the NCAA Tournament as the 13-seed in the West region. Hawaii was defeated by 4-seed Arkansas in the First round to end their season.

== Offseason ==
=== Departures ===
Hawaii Rainbow Warriors departures
| Name | Number | Pos. | Height | Weight | Year | Hometown | Reason for departure |
|---|---|---|---|---|---|---|---|
| Hunter Erickson | 0 | G | 6'3" | 166 | Graduate | Provo, UT | Out of eligibility |
| Hunter Carter | 2 | G | 6'5" | 181 | Freshman | Tacoma, WA | Transferred to Nicholls |
| Dre Bullock | 4 | G | 6'6" | 239 | Graduate | Franklinton, NC | Out of eligibility |
| Gytis Nemeikša | 5 | F | 6'8" | 226 | Senior | Kaunas, Lithuania | Out of eligibility |
| Isaac Finlinson | 6 | F | 6'8" | 186 | Junior | St. George, UT | Transferred to Western Michigan |
| AJ Economou | 8 | G | 6'5" | 217 | Sophomore | Santa Monica, CA | Transferred to Little Rock |
| Jalen Myers | 9 | F | 6'8" | 218 | Graduate | Huntsville, AL | Departed program |
| Yacine Toumi | 10 | F | 6'10" | 201 | Graduate | Meudon, France | Out of eligibility |
| Harry Rouhliadeff | 14 | F | 6'9" | 158 | Senior | Brisbane, Australia | Out of eligibility |
| Isaac Johnson | 20 | C | 7'0" | 242 | Senior | American Fork, UT | Out of eligibility |
| Aaron Hunkin-Claytor | 30 | G | 6'3" | 242 | Sophomore | Wahiawā, HI | Transferred to USC |

=== Incoming transfers ===
Hawaii Rainbow Warriors incoming transfers
| Name | Number | Pos. | Height | Weight | Year | Hometown | Previous School |
|---|---|---|---|---|---|---|---|
| Jaden Matingou | 1 | F | 6'6" | 210 | Senior | Rancho Bernardo, CA | Point Loma |
| Chance Trujillo | 2 | F | 6'9" | 215 | Junior | Kaysville, UT | Utah Tech |
| Kellen Hampton | 3 | G | 6'8" | 230 | (redshirt) Freshman | Hayward, CA | Pacific |
| Houran Dan | 6 | F | 6'8" | 205 | Junior | Baotou, China | Seattle U |
| Marcus Adams Jr. | 8 | G | 6'2" | 190 | Junior | Torrance, CA | Arizona State |
| Manie Joses | 10 | F | 6'2" | 185 | Junior | London, England | Davidson |
| Zack Davidson | 12 | F | 6'2" | 185 | Junior | Mission Viejo, CA | Northern Arizona |
| Bol Dengdit | 24 | F | 6'2" | 185 | (redshirt) Senior | Melbourne, Australia | UC San Diego |

=== 2026 recruiting class ===
College recruiting
| Name | Hometown | School | Height | Weight | Commit date |
|---|---|---|---|---|---|
| Scotty Belnap; SG | Santa Ana, CA | Mater Dei HS | 6 ft 4 in (1.93 m) | 185 lb (84 kg) | Jun 20, 2024 |
| Scotty Belnap; SG | Recruit ratings: Rivals: 247Sports: ESPN: (NR) | | | | |
| Tiger Cuff; PG | American Fork, UT | American Fork HS | 6 ft 5 in (1.96 m) | 145 lb (66 kg) | Nov 7, 2023 |
| Tiger Cuff; PG | Recruit ratings: Rivals: 247Sports: ESPN: (NR) | | | | |
| Maidy Douglas; CG | Paris, France | Nanterre 92 | 6 ft 4 in (1.93 m) | 170 lb (77 kg) | Sep 18, 2026 |
| Maidy Douglas; CG | Recruit ratings: (NR) | | | | |
Overall recruit ranking: Scout: – Rivals: –
Note: In many cases, Scout, Rivals, 247Sports, On3, and ESPN may conflict in their listings of height and weight.; In these cases, the average was taken. ESPN grades are on a 100-point scale.; Sources: "2026 Hawaii Basketball Recruiting Commits". Scout.; "Scout.com Team Recruiting Rankings". Scout.; "2026 Team Ranking". Rivals.

== Roster ==
2026–27 Hawaii Rainbow Warriors men's basketball team
Players
Coaches

| Pos. | # | Name | Height | Weight | Year | Previous school | Hometown |
|---|---|---|---|---|---|---|---|
| G | 0 | Jaden Matingou | 6 ft 3 in (1.91 m) | 175 lb (79 kg) | Sr | Point Loma | Rancho Bernardo, California |
| G | 1 | Tanner Cuff | 6 ft 7 in (2.01 m) | 210 lb (95 kg) | GS | Evansville | American Fork, Utah |
| G | 2 | Chance Trujillo | 6 ft 4 in (1.93 m) | 200 lb (91 kg) | Jr | Utah Tech | Kaysville, Utah |
| F | 3 | Kellen Hampton | 6 ft 7 in (2.01 m) | 205 lb (93 kg) | RS Fr | Pacific | Hayward, California |
| G | 5 | Scotty Belnap | 6 ft 6 in (1.98 m) | 185 lb (84 kg) | Fr | Mater Dei HS | San Clemente, California |
| C | 6 | Houran Dan | 6 ft 10 in (2.08 m) | 230 lb (104 kg) | Jr | Seattle U | Baotou, China |
| G | 7 | Isaiah Kerr | 6 ft 3 in (1.91 m) | 180 lb (82 kg) | Sr | Chico State | Palo Alto, California |
| F | 8 | Marcus Adams Jr. | 6 ft 8 in (2.03 m) | 230 lb (104 kg) | Jr | Arizona State | Torrance, California |
| G | 9 | Maidy Douglas | 6 ft 4 in (1.93 m) | 170 lb (77 kg) | Fr | Nanterre 92 | Paris, France |
| F | 10 | Manie Joses | 6 ft 7 in (2.01 m) | 190 lb (86 kg) | Jr | Davidson | London, England |
| F | 12 | Zack Davidson | 6 ft 9 in (2.06 m) | 225 lb (102 kg) | Jr | Northern Arizona | Mission Viejo, California |
| G | 21 | Lueth Awan | 6 ft 7 in (2.01 m) | 175 lb (79 kg) | So | Sydney Kings | Sydney, Australia |
| G | 22 | Tiger Cuff | 6 ft 6 in (1.98 m) | 185 lb (84 kg) | Fr | American Fork HS | American Fork, Utah |
| F/C | 24 | Bol Dengdit | 6 ft 11 in (2.11 m) | 210 lb (95 kg) | RS Sr | UC San Diego | Melbourne, Australia |
| F | 27 | Aloïs Leyrolles | 6 ft 8 in (2.03 m) | 210 lb (95 kg) | So | Fribourg Olympic | Fribourg, Switzerland |

Head coach

- Eran Ganot (Swarthmore)

Assistant coach(es)

- Gibson Johnson (Hawaiʻi)
- John Montgomery (Loyola Marymount)
- Adam Jacobsen (Pacific)
- Noah Allen (Hawaiʻi)
- Cody Kelley (South Dakota)

Legend

- (C) Team captain
- (S) Suspended
- (I) Ineligible
- (W) Walk-on
- Injured
- Current redshirt

Roster

== Schedule and results ==
| Date time, TV | Rank^{#} | Opponent^{#} | Result | Record | High points | High rebounds | High assists | Site (attendance) city, state |
Exhibition
| October 25, 2026*; 5:00 p.m. | | Hawaii Pacific | W 89–60 | | 19 – Matingou | 6 – Davidson | 5 – Ta. Cuff | Stan Sheriff Center (1,500); Honolulu, HI |
Non-conference regular season
| November 2, 2026*; 7:00 p.m., MW+ | | Seattle | W 74–73 | 1–0 | 20 – Matingou | 7 – Adams Jr. | 6 – Ta. Cuff | Stan Sheriff Center (4,256); Honolulu, HI |
| November 6, 2026*; 7:00 p.m., MW+ | | Bethesda; Rainbow Classic | W 116–44 | 2–0 | 20 – Davidson | 13 – Dengdit | 7 – Ti. Cuff | Stan Sheriff Center (4,378); Honolulu, HI |
| November 8, 2026*; 5:00 p.m., MW+ | | UT Arlington; Rainbow Classic | W 71–62 | 3–0 | 15 – Dengdit | 8 – Tied | 4 – Trujillo | Stan Sheriff Center (4,325); Honolulu, HI |
| November 9, 2026*; 7:00 p.m., MW+ | | Portland; Rainbow Classic | L 66–73 | 3–1 | 22 – Ta. Cuff | 8 – Ta. Cuff | 7 – Trujillo | Stan Sheriff Center (4,342); Honolulu, HI |
| November 18, 2026*; 5:00 p.m., TBD | | vs. Washington State | L 63–79 | 3–2 | 17 – Trujillo | 8 – Dengdit | 3 – Ta. Cuff | Angel of the Winds Arena (2,168); Everett, WA |
| November 25, 2026*; 7:00 p.m., MW+ | | Incarnate Word | | | | | | Stan Sheriff Center; Honolulu, HI |
| December 1, 2026*; 4:30 p.m., ESPN+ | | at San Diego | | | | | | Jenny Craig Pavilion; San Diego, CA |
| December 4, 2026*; 5:00 p.m., ESPN+ | | at Loyola Marymount | | | | | | Gersten Pavilion; Los Angeles, CA |
| December 9, 2026*; 7:00 p.m., MW+ | | Hawaii–Hilo | | | | | | Stan Sheriff Center; Honolulu, HI |
| December 12, 2026*; 7:00 p.m., MW+ | | Southeastern Louisiana | | | | | | Stan Sheriff Center; Honolulu, HI |
| December 20, 2026*; 5:00 p.m., MW+ | | UC Irvine | | | | | | Stan Sheriff Center; Honolulu, HI |
| December 22, 2026*; 7:00 p.m., MW+ | | Alabama State | | | | | | Stan Sheriff Center; Honolulu, HI |
Mountain West regular season
| January 2, 2027; TBD, MW+ | | at San Jose State | | | | | | Provident Credit Union Event Center; San Jose, CA |
| January 5, 2027; 4:00 p.m., MW+ | | at UC Davis | | | | | | University Credit Union Center; Davis, CA |
| January 8, 2027; 4:00 p.m., FS1 | | at Nevada | | | | | | Lawlor Events Center; Reno, NV |
| January 12, 2027; 7:00 p.m., MW+ | | Air Force | | | | | | Stan Sheriff Center; Honolulu, HI |
| January 16, 2027; 7:00 p.m., MW+ | | Wyoming | | | | | | Stan Sheriff Center; Honolulu, HI |
| January 20, 2027; 3:00 p.m., CW | | at Grand Canyon | | | | | | Global Credit Union Arena; Phoenix, AZ |
| January 23, 2027; 5:00 p.m., FS1 | | at UNLV | | | | | | Thomas & Mack Center; Paradise, NV |
| January 26, 2027; 7:00 p.m., FS1 | | New Mexico | | | | | | Stan Sheriff Center; Honolulu, HI |
| January 30, 2027; 7:00 p.m., MW+ | | UC Davis | | | | | | Stan Sheriff Center; Honolulu, HI |
| February 6, 2027; 7:00 p.m., MW+ | | UTEP | | | | | | Stan Sheriff Center; Honolulu, HI |
| February 10, 2027; 3:30 p.m., MW+ | | at Air Force | | | | | | Clune Arena; Colorado Springs, CO |
| February 13, 2027; 12:30 p.m., The CW | | at Wyoming | | | | | | Arena-Auditorium; Laramie, WY |
| February 16, 2027; 7:00 p.m., MW+ | | San Jose State | | | | | | Stan Sheriff Center; Honolulu, HI |
| February 20, 2027; 3:30 p.m., The CW | | Nevada | | | | | | Stan Sheriff Center; Honolulu, HI |
| February 24, 2027; 3:00 p.m., CW | | at New Mexico | | | | | | The Pit; Albuquerque, NM |
| February 27, 2027; 4:00 p.m., MW+ | | at UTEP | | | | | | Don Haskins Center; El Paso, TX |
| March 3, 2027; 6:00 p.m., FS1 | | Grand Canyon | | | | | | Stan Sheriff Center; Honolulu, HI |
| March 6, 2027; 7:00 p.m., MW+ | | UNLV | | | | | | Stan Sheriff Center; Honolulu, HI |
Mountain West tournament
| March 10, 2027; TBD, TBD | | vs. TBD | | | | | | Thomas & Mack Center; Paradise, NV |
*Non-conference game. ^{#}Rankings from AP Poll. (#) Tournament seedings in parentheses. All times are in Hawaii–Aleutian Time.
