= 2026–27 UC Davis Aggies men's basketball team =

American college basketball season

2026–27 UC Davis Aggies men's basketball
- Conference: Mountain West Conference
- Record: 3–1 (0–0 MW)
- Head coach: Jim Les (16th season)
- Associate head coach: Kevin Nosek (19th, 25th overall season)
- Assistant coaches: Kyle Vogt (15th season); Jonathan Metzger-Jones (11th season); Jay Flores (1st season); Mike Kosich (2nd season)
- Home arena: University Credit Union Center (Capacity: 7,600)

2026–27 Mountain West Conference men's basketball standings
	Conf.				Overall
Team	W		L	PCT	W		L	PCT
Grand Canyon	0	–	0	–	4	–	0	1.000
Wyoming	0	–	0	–	4	–	1	.800
New Mexico	0	–	0	–	3	–	1	.750
UTEP	0	–	0	–	3	–	1	.750
Air Force	0	–	0	–	3	–	2	.600
Hawaii	0	–	0	–	3	–	2	.600
Nevada	0	–	0	–	3	–	2	.600
San Jose State	0	–	0	–	3	–	2	.600
UC Davis	0	–	0	–	3	–	2	.600
UNLV	0	–	0	–	3	–	2	.600
† 2027 Mountain West tournament winner As of November 19, 2026; Rankings from AP poll

The 2026–27 UC Davis Aggies men's basketball team will represent the University of California, Davis during the 2026–27 NCAA Division I men's basketball season. The Aggies will be led by sixteenth-year head coach Jim Les and will play their home games at the University Credit Union Center in Davis, California as a member of the Mountain West Conference. This will mark UC Davis' first season as members of the Mountain West Conference after spending the previous nineteen seasons as members of the Big West Conference.

== Previous season ==
UC Davis finished the 2025-26 season 19–14, 11–9 in the Big West Conference to finish tied for sixth in the conference. As the 6-seed in the Big West Tournament the Aggies defeated 7-seed UC Santa Barbara in the First round before falling to 3-seed Cal State Fullerton in the Quarterfinals 70-82 to end their season.

== Offseason ==
=== Departures ===
UC Davis Aggies departures
Name	Number	Pos.	Height	Weight	Year	Hometown	Reason for departure
Carl Daughtery Jr.	1	G	6'3"	200	Senior	Maumelle, AR	Transferred to Kansas City
Marcus Wilson	2	G	6'3"	180	(redshirt) Freshman	Albuquerque, NM	Transferred to Sacramento State
Niko Rocak	7	F	6'9"	230	Graduate	Geneva, Switzerland	Out of eligibility
Cyril "CJ" Franklin Jr.	10	G	6'5"	175	Sophomore	Las Vegas, NV	Entered transfer portal
Jonathan Noudjihidi	13	C	6'11"	225	Junior	N'Djamena, Chad	Transferred to Saint Peter's
Abdullah Amzil	14	F	6'7"	210	Freshman	Helsinki, Finland	Transferred to Loyola (MD)
Nils Cooper	36	G	6'6"	185	Junior	Santa Monica, CA	Transferred to UC Irvine

=== Incoming transfers ===
UC Davis Aggies incoming transfers
Name	Number	Pos.	Height	Weight	Year	Hometown	Previous School
Clarence Massamba	1	G	6'5"	195	Sophomore	Paris, France	Tennessee
Julian Margrave	12	F	6'10"	225	Senior	Louisburg, KS	Omaha
Aleks Szymczyk	13	C	6'10"	250	Senior	Frankfurt, Germany	Cal State Northridge
Veniamin Abosi	14	G/F	6'6"	225	Junior	Heraklion, Greece	San Francisco

=== 2026 recruiting class ===
College recruiting
Name	Hometown	School	Height	Weight	Commit date
Julian Dabrowksi; C	Warsaw, Poland	Legia Warszawa	6 ft 10 in (2.08 m)	220 lb (100 kg)	Jul 29, 2026
Julian Dabrowksi; C	Recruit ratings: Rivals: 247Sports: ESPN: (NR)				
Caspian Jones; SF	Phoenix, AZ	St. Mary's HS	6 ft 6 in (1.98 m)	215 lb (98 kg)	Jun 9, 2026
Caspian Jones; SF	Recruit ratings: Rivals: 247Sports: ESPN: (NR)				
Koby Moir; PG	Adelaide, Australia	South Adelaide Panthers	6 ft 11 in (2.11 m)	245 lb (111 kg)	Jul 12, 2026
Koby Moir; PG	Recruit ratings: Rivals: 247Sports: ESPN: (NR)				
Nnadalu Noble; PF	Vienna, Austria	Brewster Academy	6 ft 9 in (2.06 m)	220 lb (100 kg)	Apr 27, 2026
Nnadalu Noble; PF	Recruit ratings: Rivals: 247Sports: ESPN: (NR)				
Overall recruit ranking: Scout: – Rivals: –
Note: In many cases, Scout, Rivals, 247Sports, On3, and ESPN may conflict in their listings of height and weight.; In these cases, the average was taken. ESPN grades are on a 100-point scale.; Sources: "2026 UC Davis Basketball Recruiting Commits". Scout.; "Scout.com Team Recruiting Rankings". Scout.; "2026 Team Ranking". Rivals.

== Roster ==
2026–27 UC Davis Aggies men's basketball team
Players
Coaches

Pos.	#	Name	Height	Weight	Year	Previous school	Hometown
G	0	Brayden Fagbemi	6 ft 0 in (1.83 m)	185 lb (84 kg)	Sr	Central Arkansas	Naperville, Illinois
G	1	Clarence Massamba	6 ft 5 in (1.96 m)	195 lb (88 kg)	So	Tennessee	Paris, France
G	2	Jalen Stokes	6 ft 5 in (1.96 m)	225 lb (102 kg)	So	Dougherty Valley HS	Oakland, California
F	3	Nnadalu Noble	6 ft 9 in (2.06 m)	220 lb (100 kg)	Fr	Brewster Academy	Vienna, Austria
G	4	Connor Sevilla	6 ft 1 in (1.85 m)	190 lb (86 kg)	Sr	Dougherty Valley HS	San Ramon, California
F	7	Caspian Jones	6 ft 6 in (1.98 m)	215 lb (98 kg)	Fr	CATS Academy Boston	Phoenix, Arizona
G	8	Chase Rawlins	6 ft 5 in (1.96 m)	175 lb (79 kg)	So	Folsom HS	Folsom, California
G	11	Ylan Esso-Essis	6 ft 8 in (2.03 m)	225 lb (102 kg)	RS So	Modesto JC	Le Mans, France
F	12	Julian Margrave	6 ft 10 in (2.08 m)	225 lb (102 kg)	Sr	Omaha	Louisburg, Kansas
C	13	Aleks Szymczyk	6 ft 10 in (2.08 m)	250 lb (113 kg)	Sr	Cal State Northridge	Frankfurt, Germany
G/F	14	Veniamin Abosi	6 ft 6 in (1.98 m)	225 lb (102 kg)	Jr	San Francisco	Heraklion, Greece
F	20	Isaiah Chappell	6 ft 9 in (2.06 m)	225 lb (102 kg)	Jr	Crossroads School	Los Angeles, California
F	21	Omer Suljanovic	6 ft 9 in (2.06 m)	205 lb (93 kg)	So	UCC Assigeco Piacenza	Vienna, Austria
G	30	Koby Moir	6 ft 2 in (1.88 m)	189 lb (86 kg)	Fr	South Adelaide Panthers	Adelaide, Australia
F	35	Julian Dabrowski	6 ft 10 in (2.08 m)	220 lb (100 kg)	Fr	Legia Warszawa	Warsaw, Poland

Head coach

- Jim Les (Bradley)

Assistant coach(es)

- Kevin Nosek (UC Davis)
- Kyle Vogt (Lakeland)
- Jonathan Metzger-Jones (Pacific)
- Jay Flores (Chico State)
- Mike Kosich (Montana State Billings)

Legend

- (C) Team captain
- (S) Suspended
- (I) Ineligible
- (W) Walk-on
- Injured
- Current redshirt

Roster
Last update: 2026-09-15

== Schedule and results ==
Date time, TV	Rank^{#}	Opponent^{#}	Result	Record	High points	High rebounds	High assists	Site (attendance) city, state
Non-conference regular season
November 2, 2026*; 7:00 p.m., MW+		North Alabama	L 75–79	0–1	18 – Stokes	6 – Tied	5 – Fagbemi	University Credit Union Center (1,872); Davis, CA
November 5, 2026*; 6:00 p.m., MW+		Menlo	W 65–52	1–1	18 – Abosi	10 – Tied	8 – Fagbemi	University Credit Union Center (1,178); Davis, CA
November 11, 2026*; 11:00 a.m., MW+		Incarnate Word	W 81–69	2–1	18 – Sevilla	10 – Abosi	9 – Fagbemi	University Credit Union Center (1,977); Davis, CA
November 14, 2026*; 5:00 p.m., ESPN+		at Sacramento State; Causeway Classic	W 75–56	3–1	16 – Sevilla	10 – Stokes	5 – Fagbemi	Hornet Pavilion (3,122); Sacramento, CA
November 17, 2026*; 6:00 p.m., MW+		Alabama State	L 68–75	3–2	17 – Sevilla	6 – Tied	10 – Rawlins	University Credit Union Center (4,382); Davis, CA
November 25, 2026*; 5:00 p.m., TBD		vs. Omaha; Resorts World Classic						Resorts World Events Center; Winchester, NV
November 26, 2026*; 5:00 p.m., TBD		vs. Jacksonville State; Resorts World Classic						Resorts World Events Center; Winchester, NV
November 27, 2026*; 5:00 p.m., TBD		vs. Pacific; Resorts World Classic						Resorts World Events Center; Winchester, NV
December 1, 2026*; 6:00 p.m., MW+		Portland						University Credit Union Center; Davis, CA
December 3, 2026*; 5:00 p.m., SLN		at North Dakota State						Scheels Center; Fargo, ND
December 14, 2026*; 6:00 p.m., MW+		California Baptist						University Credit Union Center; Davis, CA
December 17, 2026*; 6:00 p.m., MW+		Idaho State						University Credit Union Center; Davis, CA
December 22, 2026*; 7:00 p.m., ESPN+		at Seattle						Redhawk Center; Seattle, WA
December 28, 2026*; 6:00 p.m., MW+		Pacific Union						University Credit Union Center; Davis, CA
Mountain West regular season
January 2, 2027; 5:00 p.m., MW+		Grand Canyon						University Credit Union Center; Davis, CA
January 5, 2027; 6:00 p.m., MW+		Hawaii						University Credit Union Center; Davis, CA
January 9, 2027; 3:45 p.m., CW		at New Mexico						The Pit; Albuquerque, NM
January 12, 2027; 5:30 p.m., MW+		at Wyoming						Arena-Auditorium; Laramie, WY
January 16, 2027; 4:00 p.m., MW+		San Jose State						University Credit Union Center; Davis, CA
January 19, 2027; 6:00 p.m., MW+		UNLV						University Credit Union Center; Davis, CA
January 23, 2027; 6:00 p.m., MW+		at UTEP						Don Haskins Center; El Paso, TX
January 30, 2027; TBD, MW+		at Hawaii						Stan Sheriff Center; Honolulu, HI
February 3, 2027; 7:30 p.m., FS1		Nevada						University Credit Union Center; Davis, CA
February 6, 2027; 4:00 p.m., MW+		Air Force						University Credit Union Center; Davis, CA
February 9, 2027; 7:30 p.m., FS1		at San Jose State						Provident Credit Union Event Center; San Jose, CA
February 13, 2027; 4:00 p.m., MW+		UTEP						University Credit Union Center; Davis, CA
February 16, 2027; 7:00 p.m., MW+		at Nevada						Lawlor Events Center; Reno, NV
February 20, 2027; 12:00 p.m., MW+		at Air Force						Clune Arena; Colorado Springs, CO
February 23, 2027; 6:00 p.m., MW+		Wyoming						University Credit Union Center; Davis, CA
February 27, 2027; 4:00 p.m., MW+		New Mexico						University Credit Union Center; Davis, CA
March 2, 2027; 7:00 p.m., MW+		at UNLV						Thomas & Mack Center; Paradise, NV
March 6, 2027; 12:00 p.m., CW		at Grand Canyon						Global Credit Union Arena; Phoenix, AZ
Mountain West tournament
March 10, 2027; TBD, TBD		vs. TBD						Thomas & Mack Center; Paradise, NV
*Non-conference game. ^{#}Rankings from AP Poll. (#) Tournament seedings in parentheses. All times are in Pacific Time.
