= Chris Acker =

American basketball coach (born 1980)

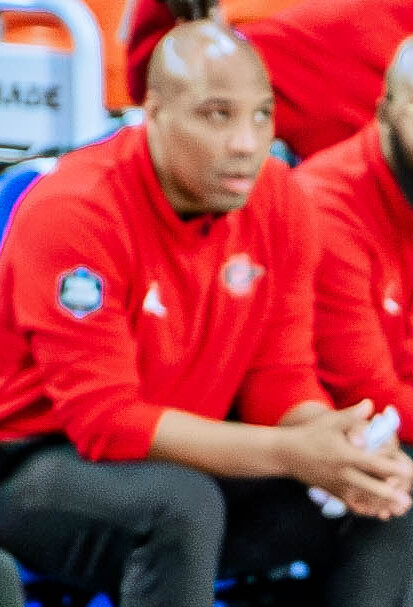
- Acker in 2024

Current position
- Title: Head coach
- Team: Long Beach State
- Conference: Big West
- Record: 18–50 (.265)

Biographical details
- Born: May 1, 1980 (age 46)

Playing career
- 2001–2003: Howard College
- 2003–2004: Chaminade
- Position: Guard

Coaching career (HC unless noted)
- 2007–2013: Citrus (assistant)
- 2013–2015: West Los Angeles
- 2015–2017: Hawaii (assistant)
- 2017–2019: Boise State (assistant)
- 2019–2024: San Diego State (assistant)
- 2024–present: Long Beach State

Head coaching record
- Overall: 18–50 (.265) (NCAA)

Chris Acker (born May 1, 1980) is an American basketball coach and former player. He is currently the head coach of the Long Beach State Beach.

== Early life and playing career ==
Acker was born on May 1, 1980. He grew up in Compton, California, but attended St. James School, Maryland. He was a nominee for the McDonald's All-American Game at St. James. Afterwards, he played two seasons at Howard College in Texas before transferring to Chaminade University of Honolulu.

With the NCAA Division II Chaminade Silverswords, Acker saw limited action as a junior, starting three games as a guard while having an average of five points with 13.3 minutes-per-game. Despite his limited experience at a small school, Acker declared for the 2004 NBA draft as an early entrant, something that received significant attention due to his very unlikely chances of being selected. He was not selected, but did subsequently play for several seasons internationally, including in the U.S., Greece, Portugal and China.

Acker later attended the University of Phoenix, where he received a bachelor's degree in 2010, and received a master's degree from Concordia University Irvine in 2012.

== Coaching career ==
Acker became an assistant coach at Citrus College in 2007 and remained an assistant through the 2012–13 season, helping them win a state championship in 2008. In 2013, he joined West Los Angeles College as head coach, and led a team that started with only true freshmen to an 18–9 record by his second season. He became an assistant coach with the Hawaii Rainbow Warriors in 2015. In charge of defensive schemes and player development at Hawaii, he helped the team win the Big West Conference (BWC) with an appearance in the NCAA tournament in his first season.

In 2017, Acker was hired as an assistant coach for the Boise State Broncos. Two years later, he left to become an assistant with the San Diego State Aztecs. Starting with his second season there, Acker helped the Aztecs reach four straight NCAA tournaments, which included a 2023 appearance in the national championship.

Acker was announced as the head coach of the Long Beach State Beach on April 2, 2024.

== Head coaching record ==
=== NCAA DI ===
Record table
Season	Team	Overall	Conference	Standing	Postseason
Long Beach State Beach (Big West Conference) (2024–present)
2024–25	Long Beach State	7–25	3–17	10th	
2025–26	Long Beach State	10–22	6–14	9th	
2026–27	Long Beach State	1–3	0–0		
Long Beach State:		18–50 (.265)	9–31 (.225)		
Total:		18–50 (.265)			
National champion Postseason invitational champion Conference regular season champion Conference regular season and conference tournament champion Division regular season champion Division regular season and conference tournament champion Conference tournament champion
