= Gus Argenal =

American basketball coach

Current position
- Title: Head coach
- Team: UC Riverside
- Conference: Big West
- Record: 10–22 (.313)

Playing career
- 1999–2004: UC Davis

Coaching career (HC unless noted)
- 2004–2005: Arizona State (graduate assistant)
- 2005–2006: UC Davis (assistant)
- 2008–2011: Chico State (assistant)
- 2011–2012: UC Davis (assistant)
- 2012–2013: Rice (assistant)
- 2013–2017: Cal State East Bay
- 2017–2019: Nevada (assistant)
- 2019–2021: Cal State Fullerton (associate HC)
- 2021–2023: Arkansas (assistant)
- 2023–2025: Cal State San Bernardino
- 2025–present: UC Riverside

Administrative career (AD unless noted)
- 2006–2008: UTSA (DBO)

Head coaching record
- Overall: 95–118 (.446)

Accomplishments and honors

Championships
- CCAA (2024)

Gus Argenal is an American college basketball coach who is the head coach of the UC Riverside Highlanders men's basketball team.

== Early life and playing career ==
Argenal grew up in Lafayette, California and attended De La Salle High School, where he was a three-year starter on the basketball team. He played college basketball for four seasons at UC Davis. Argenal holds the Aggies records for assists in a single game with 14.

== Coaching career ==
Argenal began his coaching career as a graduate assistant at Arizona State during the 2004–2005 season. He returned to UC Davis as an assistant the following year. Argenal served as the Director of Basketball Operations at UTSA from 2006 to 2008. He then was an assistant at Chico State for three seasons, where he coached his younger brother Justin. Argenal rejoined UC Davis as an assistant before moving to an assistant position at Rice in 2012.

Agernal was hired as the head coach at Cal State East Bay on May 29, 2013. He coached the Pioneers for four seasons with a 35-76 record before resigning after the 2016–2017 season.

After resigning, Argenal was hired as an assistant at Nevada on Eric Musselman's staff, where he served for two seasons. He was hired as an associated head coach at Cal State Fullerton after the 2018–2019 season. Argenal left Cal State Fullerton after two seasons to take an assistant position at Arkansas, reuniting him with Musselman.

Argenal was hired as the head coach at Cal State San Bernardino on May 25, 2023. In his first season leading the Coyotes' the team went 27–8 and advanced to the Final Four of the 2024 NCAA Division II men's basketball tournament.

Argenal was hired as the head coach at UC Riverside on May 1, 2025.

== Head coaching record ==
Record table
Season	Team	Overall	Conference	Standing	Postseason
Cal State East Bay Pioneers (California Collegiate Athletic Association) (2013–2017)
2013–2014	Cal State East Bay	7–21	4–18		
2014–2015	Cal State East Bay	6–22	4–18		
2015–2016	Cal State East Bay	9–18	5–15		
2016–2017	Cal State East Bay	13–15	6–14		
Cal State East Bay:		35–76 (.315)	19–65 (.226)		
Cal State San Bernardino Coyotes (California Collegiate Athletic Association) (2023–2025)
2023–2024	Cal State San Bernardino	27–8	17–5	1st	NCAA Division II Final Four
2024–2025	Cal State San Bernardino	23–12	14–8	3rd	NCAA Division II Second Round
Cal State San Bernardino:		50–20 (.714)	31–13 (.705)		
UC Riverside Highlanders (Big West Conference) (2025–present)
2025–26	UC Riverside	10–22	5–15	10th	
2026–27	UC Riverside	0–0	0–0		
UC Riverside:		10–22 (.313)	5–15 (.250)		
Total:		95–118 (.446)			
