= Eran Ganot =

American basketball coach (born 1981)

Current position
- Title: Head coach
- Team: Hawai'i
- Conference: Mountain West
- Record: 198–129 (.606)

Biographical details
- Born: September 8, 1981 (age 45); Brooklyn, New York, U.S.

Playing career
- 1999–2003: Swarthmore

Coaching career (HC unless noted)
- 2003–2006: Saint Mary's (volunteer asst.)
- 2007–2010: Hawai'i (assistant)
- 2010–2015: Saint Mary's (assistant)
- 2015–present: Hawai'i

Administrative career (AD unless noted)
- 2006–2007: Hawai'i (DBO)

Head coaching record
- Overall: 201–131 (.605)
- Tournaments: 1–2 (NCAA Division I)

Accomplishments and honors

Championships
- Big West regular season (2016); 2 Big West tournament (2016, 2026)

Awards
- Big West Coach of the Year (2016)

Eran Ganot (born September 8, 1981) is an American college basketball head coach for the University of Hawaii men's team. In 2015–16, his first season as head coach at Hawaii, he earned Big West Coach of the Year accolades.

== Early and personal life ==
Ganot was born in Philadelphia, and raised in his hometown of Tenafly, New Jersey. He is Jewish. His father immigrated to the United States from Romania, and his mother immigrated to the US from Israel. He has a twin brother, named Asaf, a high-end fashion designer, and two sisters, Dani and Betty.

Ganot attended Tenafly High School, graduating in 1999. Playing for his high school basketball team, he was a two-time all-league first-team selection, and was named all-county as a senior. He now lives in Honolulu, Hawaii, with his wife Barbea and his daughter Zeza.

== College ==
Ganot lettered at Swarthmore College from 1999 to 2003, and was a two-time team captain. He graduated with a degree in economics and sociology/anthropology in 2003.

== Coaching career ==
Ganot started his coaching career at St. Mary's as a volunteer assistant coach from 2003 to 2006, before joining the Hawaii men's basketball staff as their director of basketball operations. Ganot was promoted to assistant coach after one year, coaching at Hawaii from 2007 to 2010. From 2010 to 2015, he served as assistant coach at St. Mary's in Moraga, California, and was acting head coach for five games in 2013–14, compiling a 3–2 record.

On April 9, 2015, Ganot was named the head coach at Hawaii, and signed to a three-year contract. At 33 years of age he was the second-youngest head coach in school history, and the 21st head coach ever for the university. His base salary was $225,000.

In 2015–2016, his first season as head coach at Hawaii, he led the Rainbow Warriors to the Big West regular season and tournament titles, the most wins in university history (28), the school's first NCAA Tournament appearance since 2002, and an opening-round upset over California for the teams's first-ever NCAA Tournament win. He earned Big West Coach of the Year accolades. He also received the CollegeInsider.com's Joe B. Hall Award, awarded to the top first-year head coach, as well as the Red Auerbach College Coach of the Year Award, selected by members of the Jewish Coaches Association as the top Jewish head basketball college coach.

In September 2016, the university gave him a two-year contract extension.

In November 2019, days before the Rainbow Warriors' season opener, Ganot took a leave of absence to deal with an unspecified medical issue. First year assistant Chris Gerlufsen served as acting head coach in his absence. Ganot returned to coaching on December 29, in a 91–51 win over Maine.

Ganot received a three-year contract extension prior to the 2022–23 season.

== Head coaching record ==
Record table
Season	Team	Overall	Conference	Standing	Postseason
Saint Mary's Gaels (West Coast Conference) (2013–2014)
2013–14	Saint Mary's	3–2 (Note: Ganot served as acting head coach from December 29, 2013 to January 9, 2014 due to head coach Randy Bennett's suspension for NCAA rules violations.)	2–2		
St. Mary's:		3–2 (.600)	2–2 (.500)		
Hawai'i Rainbow Warriors (Big West Conference) (2015–2026)
2015–16	Hawai'i	28–6	13–3	T–1st	NCAA Division I Round of 32
2016–17	Hawai'i	14–16	8–8	5th	
2017–18	Hawaii	17–13	8–8	6th	
2018–19	Hawai'i	18–13	9–7	4th	
2019–20	Hawai'i	9–8 (Note: Ganot missed the first 13 games of the 2019–20 season due to an undisclosed medical issue. Assistant coach Chris Gerlufsen served as acting head coach.)	8–8	4th	
2020–21	Hawai'i	11–10	9–9	6th	
2021–22	Hawai'i	17–11	10–5	3rd	
2022–23	Hawai'i	22–11	13–7	5th	
2023–24	Hawai'i	20–14	11–9	4th	
2024–25	Hawai'i	15–16	7–13	9th	
2025–26	Hawai'i	24–9	14–6	2nd	NCAA Division I Round of 64
Hawai'i Rainbow Warriors (Mountain West Conference) (2026–present)
2026–27	Hawai'i	3–2	0–0		
Hawai'i:		198–129 (.606)	107–83 (.563)		
Total:		201–131 (.605)			
National champion Postseason invitational champion Conference regular season champion Conference regular season and conference tournament champion Division regular season champion Division regular season and conference tournament champion Conference tournament champion
