= Jewish Coaches Association =

American non-profit organization

The Jewish Coaches Association (JCA) is a non-profit organization founded in 2005 that supports Jewish-American college, high school, and youth basketball coaches around the United States. The association is an advocacy group for coaches to represent coaches to the NCAA and National Association of Basketball Coaches. Founding members include Bobby Schwartz, founding national director; and Bruce Pearl, who served as the first president of the association.

== Annual events and awards ==
The JCA holds an annual breakfast for Jewish coaches at the Final Four and sometimes offers Shabbat services for coaches and their families during the Final Four weekend of events. When Passover occurs during the Final Four, the JCA can help to organize seders for coaches and their families. The Red Auerbach Coach of the Year Award recognizes the most outstanding Jewish-American basketball coach of the year. The Association takes nominations from its members and in March at the conclusion of conference tournament play the Board of Directors vote to determine a winner. The winner is presented the Red Auerbach Trophy at the Final Four.

The following are the recipients of the Red Auerbach Coach of the Year Award:

Year	Coach	Team
2009	Brad Greenberg	Radford
2010	Bruce Pearl	Tennessee
2011	Josh Pastner	Memphis
2012	Andy Yosinoff	Emmanuel
2013	Keith Dambrot	Akron
2014	Josh Schertz	Lincoln Memorial
2015	Scott Garson	College of Idaho
2016	Eran Ganot	Hawaii
2017	Steve DeMeo	Northwest Florida State
2018	Bruce Pearl (2)	Auburn Tigers
2019	Dana Pump	Lifetime Achievement Award
2019	David Pump	Lifetime Achievement Award
2022	Todd Golden	San Francisco
2023	Joe Pasternack	UC Santa Barbara
2024	Bob Pietrack	Fort Lewis
2025	Dave Klatsky	NYU

== Programs ==
The JCA provides a number of programs during the year in order to better service and promote its members. These programs include:

- Basketball Clinics and Workshops – Clinics and workshops are provided for the members to help them in their development as basketball coaches as part of its Partnership in coaching.
- Basketball Camps – The JCA looks to secure employment at college basketball camps around the country for its members.
- Networking – The JCA promotes its members careers and help them make contacts toward coaching opportunities
- Community Service – JCA member coaches work within their institutions to get their teams involved in their local communities and do charitable events and fundraisers. The organization recruits members to travel around the USA to speak and teach at Jewish camps around the nation.
- Maccabi Basketball Coaches – The JCA works with Maccabi USA and local Maccabi delegations to get JCA members involved and hired as Maccabi USA coaches and Maccabi delegation coaches. In 2009 both the JCA president and Vice-President served as coaches on the USA National Maccabi Basketball team representing our nation overseas in the World Maccabi games in Israel. Member coaches also help locate Jewish basketball players around the nation to try out for Maccabi USA teams.
- Breaking down barriers – The AJCA works to create fair hiring practices in basketball by working towards tolerance and understanding and cooperation with schools where coaches were denied interviews or not hired simply due to their faith and cultural background.
- Community of faith gatherings – The JCA organizes coaches from different backgrounds and religions for a unity breakfast and non-denominational prayer. The association works to inspire Jewish values in its member coaches to always work and coach with integrity and to serve as role models to their players and in their communities.
- Membership – The Jewish Coaches Association has a National Director and an Assistant National Director, which run the day-to-day operations. There is also a Board of Directors, which advises the National Director. The members elect a President and a Vice-President. There is an annual meeting held each year at the NABC Convention at the Final Four.
