= 2025–26 Long Beach State Beach men's basketball team =

American college basketball season

2025–26 Long Beach State Beach men's basketball
- Conference: Big West Conference
- Record: 10–22 (6–14 Big West)
- Head coach: Chris Acker (2nd season)
- Assistant coaches: John Montgomery; Anthony Santos; Phillip Scott
- Home arena: LBS Financial Credit Union Pyramid

2025–26 Big West Conference men's basketball standings
	Conf.				Overall
Team	W		L	PCT	W		L	PCT
UC Irvine	15	–	5	.750	22	–	10	.688
Hawai'i	14	–	6	.700	22	–	8	.733
Cal State Fullerton	12	–	8	.600	17	–	15	.531
Cal State Northridge	12	–	8	.600	19	–	13	.594
UC San Diego	12	–	8	.600	22	–	10	.688
UC Davis	11	–	9	.550	18	–	13	.581
UC Santa Barbara	11	–	9	.550	18	–	13	.581
Cal Poly	10	–	10	.500	14	–	18	.438
Long Beach State	6	–	14	.300	10	–	22	.313
UC Riverside	5	–	15	.250	10	–	22	.313
Cal State Bakersfield	2	–	18	.100	8	–	24	.250
† 2026 Big West tournament winner As of March 7, 2026

The 2025–26 Long Beach State Beach men's basketball team represented California State University, Long Beach during the 2025–26 NCAA Division I men's basketball season. The Beach, led by second-year head coach Chris Acker, played their home games at the LBS Financial Credit Union Pyramid in Long Beach, California as a member of the Big West Conference. They finished the season 10–22, 6–14 in Big West play to finish in ninth place. They failed to qualify for the Big West tournament.

== Previous season ==
The Beach finished the 2024–25 season 7–25, 3–17 in Big West play to finish in 10th place. They failed to qualify for the Big West tournament.

== Preseason ==
On October 16, 2025, the Big West Conference released their preseason coaches poll. Long Beach State was picked to finish eighth in the conference.

=== Preseason rankings ===
Big West Preseason Poll
Place	Team	Points
1	UC Irvine	98 (8)
2	UC Santa Barbara	93 (3)
3	Hawai'i	76
4	UC San Diego	69
5	Cal State Northridge	63
6	UC Davis	58
7	Cal Poly	54
8	Long Beach State	31
9	UC Riverside	26
10	Cal State Bakersfield	20
11	Cal State Fullerton	17
(#) first-place votes

=== Preseason All-Big West Team ===
No players were named the Preseason All-Big West Team.

== Roster ==
2025–26 Long Beach State Beach men's basketball team
Players
Coaches

Pos.	#	Name	Height	Weight	Year	Previous school	Hometown
G	0	Rob Diaz III	6 ft 2 in (1.88 m)	185 lb (84 kg)	Jr	Cal Poly Humboldt	Long Beach, California
F	1	Derrick Michael Xzavierro	6 ft 10 in (2.08 m)	235 lb (107 kg)	Jr	Grand Canyon	Jakarta, Indonesia
G	2	Shaquil Bender	6 ft 2 in (1.88 m)	185 lb (84 kg)	GS	Manhattan	Philadelphia, Pennsylvania
F	3	Dallas Washington	6 ft 10 in (2.08 m)	200 lb (91 kg)	Fr	Santa Margarita High School	Redwood City, California
F	4	Leopold Levillain	6 ft 9 in (2.06 m)	230 lb (104 kg)	Fr	Cholet Basket	Montpellier, France
F	6	Petar Majstorovic	6 ft 8 in (2.03 m)	215 lb (98 kg)	So	Syracuse	Sombor, Serbia
G	10	Cole Farrell	6 ft 5 in (1.96 m)	195 lb (88 kg)	Jr	Portland State	St. Louis, Missouri
G	11	Gavin Sykes	6 ft 4 in (1.93 m)	195 lb (88 kg)	Fr	Modesto Christian School	Sacramento, California
G	12	Isaiah Lewis	6 ft 3 in (1.91 m)	170 lb (77 kg)	Jr	Little Rock	Los Angeles, California
G	14	Immanuel Lewis	6 ft 3 in (1.91 m)	170 lb (77 kg)	Sr	Nobel	Los Angeles, California
F	15	JJ Chaikovsky	6 ft 7 in (2.01 m)	220 lb (100 kg)	So	Cal State Northridge	Manhattan Beach, California
G	22	Jayden Alexander	6 ft 1 in (1.85 m)	170 lb (77 kg)	Fr	Sierra Canyon School	Los Angeles, California
G	24	Christian Jones	6 ft 4 in (1.93 m)	195 lb (88 kg)	So	Angelina College	Los Angeles, California
F	33	Shay Johnson Jr.	6 ft 10 in (2.08 m)	225 lb (102 kg)	Sr	San Diego State	Oakland, California

Head coach

- Chris Acker (Chaminade)

Assistant coach(es)

- John Montgomery (Loyola Marymount)
- Anthony Santos (Cal State Fullerton)
- Phillip Scott (Prairie View A&M)

Legend

- (C) Team captain
- (S) Suspended
- (I) Ineligible
- (W) Walk-on
- Injured
- Current redshirt

Roster
Last update: November 5, 2025

== Schedule and results ==
Date time, TV	Rank^{#}	Opponent^{#}	Result	Record	High points	High rebounds	High assists	Site (attendance) city, state
Regular season
November 4, 2025*; 7:00 pm, MWN		at San Diego State	L 45–77	0–1	10 – Majstorovic	10 – Majstorovic	4 – Tied	Viejas Arena (11,644); San Diego, CA
November 8, 2025*; 2:00 pm, MWN		at Fresno State	L 62–82	0–2	11 – Sykes	6 – Majstorovic	2 – Majstorovic	Save Mart Center (3,133); Fresno, CA
November 12, 2025*; 7:00 pm, ESPN+		at Pacific	L 66−69	0−3	20 – Sykes	7 – Tied	3 – Tied	Alex G. Spanos Center (1,232); Stockton, CA
November 16, 2025*; 4:00 pm, ESPN+		Illinois State	L 80–82	0–4	19 – Majstorovic	7 – Majstorovic	4 – Diaz	LBS Financial Credit Union Pyramid (1,480); Long Beach, CA
November 19, 2025*; 7:00 pm, ESPN+		Nobel; Battle at the Beach	W 87–54	1–4	12 – Majstorovic	7 – Xzavierro	5 – Is. Lewis	LBS Financial Credit Union Pyramid (1,047); Long Beach, CA
November 21, 2025*; 7:00 pm, ESPN+		Montana State; Battle at the Beach	L 72–78	1–5	24 – Sykes	8 – Majstorovic	3 – Diaz III	LBS Financial Credit Union Pyramid (1,808); Long Beach, CA
November 26, 2025*; 7:00 pm, ESPN+		at Portland	L 73–93	1–6	23 – Majstorovic	5 – Sykes	4 – Sykes	Chiles Center (829); Portland, OR
November 30, 2025*; 2:00 pm, ESPN+		San Diego	W 76–72	2–6	30 – Sykes	5 – Levillain	7 – Is. Lewis	LBS Financial Credit Union Pyramid (1,062); Long Beach, CA
December 4, 2025; 6:00 pm, ESPN+		at UC Santa Barbara	L 77–84 ^{OT}	2–7 (0–1)	24 – Sykes	10 – Xzavierro	3 – Tied	The Thunderdome (2,072); Santa Barbara, CA
December 6, 2025; 6:00 pm, ESPN+		UC San Diego	L 74–80	2–8 (0–2)	20 – Sykes	7 – Johnson Jr.	5 – Diaz III	LBS Financial Credit Union Pyramid (1,153); Long Beach, CA
December 9, 2025*; 7:00 pm, MWN		at San Jose State	L 83–89 ^{OT}	2–9	26 – Sykes	8 – Majstorovic	4 – Farrell	Provident Credit Union Event Center (1,472); San Jose, CA
December 18, 2025*; 7:00 pm, ESPN+		Pepperdine	W 81–78	3–9	23 – Sykes	6 – Majstorovic	3 – Tied	LBS Financial Credit Union Pyramid (1,006); Long Beach, CA
December 21, 2025*; 3:00 pm, ESPN+		at No. 4 Iowa State	L 60–91	3–10	19 – Sykes	7 – Majstorovic	1 – Tied	Hilton Coliseum (14,267); Ames, IA
December 30, 2025*; 7:00 pm, ESPN+		Lincoln (CA)	W 113–66	4–10	21 – Sykes	8 – Majstorovic	8 – Diaz III	LBS Financial Credit Union Pyramid (1,025); Long Beach, CA
January 3, 2026; 6:00 pm, ESPN+		Cal Poly	W 74–66	5–10 (1–2)	25 – Majstorovic	10 – Majstorovic	3 – Tied	LBS Financial Credit Union Pyramid (1,182); Long Beach, CA
January 8, 2026; 7:00 pm, ESPN+		at UC Irvine	L 64–74	5–11 (1–3)	21 – Sykes	8 – Majstorovic	3 – Tied	Bren Events Center (2,354); Irvine, CA
January 10, 2026; 4:00 pm, ESPN+		Cal State Bakersfield	W 81–75	6–11 (2–3)	23 – Majstorovic	14 – Levillain	9 – Diaz III	LBS Financial Credit Union Pyramid (1,188); Long Beach, CA
January 15, 2026; 7:00 pm, ESPN+		UC Riverside	W 88–73	7–11 (3–3)	22 – Majstorovic	11 – Levillain	6 – Diaz III	LBS Financial Credit Union Pyramid (1,213); Long Beach, CA
January 17, 2026; 5:00 pm, ESPN+		at Cal State Northridge	W 87–80	8–11 (4–3)	34 – Sykes	6 – Diaz III	4 – Lewis	Premier America Credit Union Arena (702); Northridge, CA
January 22, 2026; 7:00 pm, ESPN+		at Cal State Fullerton	L 61–71	8–12 (4–4)	20 – Sykes	7 – Majstorovic	4 – Sykes	Titan Gym (2,428); Fullerton, CA
January 24, 2026; 4:00 pm, ESPN+		UC Santa Barbara	L 71–74	8–13 (4–5)	21 – Majstorovic	7 – Levillain	5 – Sykes	LBS Financial Credit Union Pyramid (2,351); Long Beach, CA
January 29, 2026; 7:00 pm, ESPN+		at UC Riverside	L 61–71	8–14 (4–6)	13 – Lewis	9 – Majstorovic	4 – Lewis	SRC Arena (407); Riverside, CA
January 31, 2026; 1:00 pm, ESPN+		Hawai'i	L 82–89	8–15 (4–7)	22 – Tied	10 – Levillain	6 – Lewis	LBS Financial Credit Union Pyramid (1,368); Long Beach, CA
February 5, 2026; 7:00 pm, ESPN+		at UC San Diego	L 74–77	8–16 (4–8)	22 – Bender	8 – Majstorovic	5 – Diaz III	LionTree Arena (1,867); La Jolla, CA
February 12, 2026; 7:00 pm, ESPN+		Cal State Fullerton	L 82–86	8–17 (4–9)	22 – Majstorovic	7 – Diaz III	3 – Tied	LBS Financial Credit Union Pyramid (2,134); Long Beach, CA
February 14, 2026; 2:00 pm, ESPN+		at UC Davis	L 54–71	8–18 (4–10)	18 – Sykes	6 – Levillain	3 – Lewis	University Credit Union Center (1,317); Davis, CA
February 19, 2026; 7:00 pm, ESPN+		UC Irvine	L 58–69	8–19 (4–11)	16 – Sykes	10 – Majstorovic	2 – Bender	LBS Financial Credit Union Pyramid (1,711); Long Beach, CA
February 21, 2026; 6:00 pm, ESPN+		Cal State Northridge	L 76–78	8–20 (4–12)	27 – Bender	7 – Levillain	4 – Majstorovic	LBS Financial Credit Union Pyramid (1,551); Long Beach, CA
February 26, 2026; 7:00 pm, ESPN+		at Cal Poly	L 92–102	8–21 (4–13)	28 – Sykes	6 – Levillain	5 – Bender	Mott Athletics Center (1,692); San Luis Obispo, CA
February 28, 2026; 6:30 pm, ESPN+		at Cal State Bakersfield	W 88–87	9–21 (5–13)	39 – Sykes	13 – Levillain	4 – Bender	Icardo Center (517); Bakersfield, CA
March 5, 2026; 7:00 pm, ESPN+		UC Davis	L 70–76 ^{OT}	9–22 (5–14)	33 – Diaz III	12 – Diaz III	2 – Tied	LBS Financial Credit Union Pyramid (1,419); Long Beach, CA
March 7, 2026; 9:00 pm, ESPN+		at Hawai'i	W 84–75	10–22 (6–14)	34 – Sykes	9 – Majstorovic	1 – Tied	Stan Sheriff Center (6,512); Honolulu, HI
*Non-conference game. ^{#}Rankings from AP Poll. (#) Tournament seedings in parentheses. All times are in Pacific.
