= 2025–26 Hawaii Rainbow Warriors basketball team =

American college basketball season

2025–26 Hawaii Rainbow Warriors basketball

Big West tournament champions Outrigger Rainbow Classic champions

NCAA Tournament, First round
- Conference: Big West Conference
- Record: 24–9 (14–6 Big West)
- Head coach: Eran Ganot (11th season)
- Associate head coach: Brad Davidson
- Assistant coaches: Rob Jones; Gibson Johnson; Clay Wilson
- Home arena: Stan Sheriff Center (Capacity: 10,300)

2025–26 Big West Conference men's basketball standings
	Conf.				Overall
Team	W		L	PCT	W		L	PCT
UC Irvine	15	–	5	.750	23	–	12	.657
Hawai'i †	14	–	6	.700	24	–	9	.727
Cal State Fullerton	12	–	8	.600	18	–	16	.529
Cal State Northridge	12	–	8	.600	20	–	14	.588
UC San Diego	12	–	8	.600	23	–	11	.676
UC Davis	11	–	9	.550	19	–	14	.576
UC Santa Barbara	11	–	9	.550	18	–	14	.563
Cal Poly	10	–	10	.500	14	–	19	.424
Long Beach State	6	–	14	.300	10	–	22	.313
UC Riverside	5	–	15	.250	10	–	22	.313
Cal State Bakersfield	2	–	18	.100	8	–	24	.250
† 2026 Big West tournament winner

The 2025–26 Hawaii Rainbow Warriors basketball team represented the University of Hawaiʻi at Mānoa during the 2025–26 NCAA Division I men's basketball season. The Rainbow Warriors, led by eleventh-year head coach Eran Ganot, played their home games at the Stan Sheriff Center in Honolulu, Hawaii as members of the Big West Conference. They finished the regular season 22–8, 14–6 in Big West play to finish in second place.

The season marked the last as members of the Big West, as the school will join the Mountain West Conference on July 1, 2026.

== Previous season ==
The Rainbow Warriors finished the 2024–25 season 15–16, 7–13 in Big West play, to finish in ninth place. They failed to make the Big West tournament as only the top eight teams qualify.

== Preseason ==
On October 16, 2025, the Big West Conference released their preseason coaches poll. Hawaiʻi was picked to finish third in the conference.

=== Preseason rankings ===
Big West Preseason Poll
Place	Team	Points
1	UC Irvine	98 (8)
2	UC Santa Barbara	93 (3)
3	Hawaiʻi	76
4	UC San Diego	69
5	Cal State Northridge	63
6	UC Davis	58
7	Cal Poly	54
8	Long Beach State	31
9	UC Riverside	26
10	Cal State Bakersfield	20
11	Cal State Fullerton	17
(#) first-place votes

=== Preseason All-Big West Team ===
Preseason All-Big West Team
Player	Year	Position
Gytis Nemeikša	Senior	Forward

== Roster ==
2025–26 Hawaii Rainbow Warriors men's basketball team
Players
Coaches

Pos.	#	Name	Height	Weight	Year	Previous school	Hometown
G	0	Hunter Erickson	6 ft 3 in (1.91 m)	200 lb (91 kg)	GS	Utah	Provo, Utah
G	1	Tanner Cuff	6 ft 7 in (2.01 m)	210 lb (95 kg)	GS	Evansville	American Fork, Utah
G	2	Hunter Carter	6 ft 5 in (1.96 m)	170 lb (77 kg)	Fr	Rosemary Anderson Prep	Tacoma, Washington
G	4	Dre Bullock	6 ft 6 in (1.98 m)	190 lb (86 kg)	GS	South Dakota	Franklinton, North Carolina
F	5	Gytis Nemeikša	6 ft 8 in (2.03 m)	220 lb (100 kg)	Sr	Xavier	Kaunas, Lithuania
F	6	Isaac Finlinson	6 ft 8 in (2.03 m)	185 lb (84 kg)	Jr	Snow College	St. George, Utah
G	7	Isaiah Kerr	6 ft 3 in (1.91 m)	180 lb (82 kg)	Jr	Chico State	Palo Alto, California
G	8	AJ Economou	6 ft 5 in (1.96 m)	180 lb (82 kg)	So	Southern California Academy	Santa Monica, California
F	9	Jalen Myers	6 ft 8 in (2.03 m)	200 lb (91 kg)	GS	Norfolk State	Huntsville, Alabama
F	10	Yacine Toumi	6 ft 10 in (2.08 m)	200 lb (91 kg)	GS	Seton Hall	Meudon, France
F	14	Harry Rouhliadeff	6 ft 9 in (2.06 m)	230 lb (104 kg)	Sr	Villanova College	Brisbane, Australia
C	20	Isaac Johnson	7 ft 0 in (2.13 m)	240 lb (109 kg)	Sr	Utah State	American Fork, Utah
G	30	Aaron Hunkin-Claytor	6 ft 3 in (1.91 m)	175 lb (79 kg)	So	Salesian College Prep	Wahiawā, Hawaii

Head coach

- Eran Ganot (Swarthmore)

Assistant coach(es)

- Brad Davidson (Sydney)
- Rob Jones (Saint Mary's)
- Gibson Johnson (Hawaiʻi)
- Clay Wilson (Princeton)

Legend

- (C) Team captain
- (S) Suspended
- (I) Ineligible
- (W) Walk-on
- Injured
- Current redshirt

Roster

== Schedule and results ==
Date time, TV	Rank^{#}	Opponent^{#}	Result	Record	High points	High rebounds	High assists	Site (attendance) city, state
Exhibition
October 18, 2025*; 7:00 p.m.		Pomona–Pitzer	W 101–51	–	18 – Tied	8 – Cuff	7 – Cuff	Stan Sheriff Center (1,420); Honolulu, HI
October 26, 2025*; 5:00 p.m.		Chaminade	W 93–87	–	23 – Bullock	12 – Nemeikša	6 – Cuff	Stan Sheriff Center (2,025); Honolulu, HI
Regular season
November 4, 2025*; 5:30 p.m., BTN		at Oregon	L 59–60	0–1	13 – Johnson	8 – Johnson	3 – Tied	Matthew Knight Arena (5,627); Eugene, OR
November 9, 2025*; 8:00 p.m., Spectrum Sports		East Texas A&M	W 100–74	1–1	15 – Tied	11 – Johnson	4 – Bullock	Stan Sheriff Center (3,947); Honolulu, HI
November 12, 2025*; 7:00 p.m., Spectrum Sports		Mississippi Valley State; OUTRIGGER Rainbow Classic	W 88–56	2–1	22 – Rouhliadeff	6 – Tied	11 – Hunkin-Claytor	Stan Sheriff Center (4,091); Honolulu, HI
November 14, 2025*; 7:00 p.m., Spectrum Sports		Manhattan; OUTRIGGER Rainbow Classic	W 86–56	3–1	25 – Johnson	11 – Johnson	4 – Tied	Stan Sheriff Center (4,296); Honolulu, HI
November 15, 2025*; 7:00 p.m., Spectrum Sports		Utah Tech; OUTRIGGER Rainbow Classic	W 68–62	4–1	23 – Bullock	11 – Johnson	2 – Tied	Stan Sheriff Center (5,211); Honolulu, HI
November 20, 2025*; 7:00 p.m., Spectrum Sports		Arizona State	L 76–83	4–2	23 – Johnson	9 – Bullock	3 – Hunkin-Claytor	Stan Sheriff Center (4,782); Honolulu, HI
November 24, 2025*; 7:00 p.m., Spectrum Sports		Hawaii Pacific	W 88–76	5–2	16 – Johnson	8 – Tied	5 – Hunkin-Claytor	Stan Sheriff Center (4,235); Honolulu, HI
November 28, 2025*; 7:00 p.m., Spectrum Sports		North Dakota	W 92–55	6–2	15 – Tied	6 – Tied	5 – Erickson	Stan Sheriff Center (4,088); Honolulu, HI
December 4, 2025; 7:00 p.m., Spectrum Sports		UC Davis	W 75–69	7–2 (1–0)	15 – Bullock	7 – Johnson	3 – Bullock	Stan Sheriff Center (4,219); Honolulu, HI
December 6, 2025; 7:00 p.m., Spectrum Sports		Cal State Fullerton	W 69–59	8–2 (2–0)	12 – Tied	10 – Nemeikša	4 – Erickson	Stan Sheriff Center (4,374); Honolulu, HI
December 10, 2025*; 7:00 p.m., ESPN+		Hawaiʻi–Hilo	W 98–46	9–2	16 – Rouhliadeff	9 – Rouhliadeff	5 – Tied	Stan Sheriff Center (3,851); Honolulu, HI
December 13, 2025*; 7:00 p.m., ESPN+		UTEP	W 66–61	10–2	22 – Rouhliadeff	7 – Rouhliadeff	4 – Hunkin-Claytor	Stan Sheriff Center (4,694); Honolulu, HI
January 1, 2026; 3:00 p.m., Spectrum SportsNet		at UC Riverside	W 88–45	11–2 (3–0)	18 – Johnson	9 – Nemeikša	6 – Hunkin-Claytor	SRC Arena (327); Riverside, CA
January 3, 2026; 5:00 p.m., ESPN+		at UC San Diego	L 73–83	11–3 (3–1)	16 – Rouhliadeff	6 – Nemeikša	6 – Erickson	LionTree Arena (1,808); La Jolla, CA
January 10, 2026; 7:00 p.m., Spectrum Sports		UC Irvine	W 67–66	12–3 (4–1)	15 – Johnson	5 – Johnson	6 – Hunkin-Claytor	Stan Sheriff Center (6,127); Honolulu, HI
January 15, 2026; 5:00 p.m., ESPN+		at Cal Poly	W 86–66	13–3 (5–1)	21 – Nemeikša	11 – Nemeikša	5 – Hunkin-Claytor	Mott Athletics Center (2,612); San Luis Obispo, CA
January 17, 2026; 4:00 p.m., ESPN+		at UC Santa Barbara	L 62–77	13–4 (5–2)	13 – Kerr	6 – Bullock	3 – Erickson	The Thunderdome (2,589); Santa Barbara, CA
January 22, 2026; 7:00 p.m., Spectrum Sports		Cal State Bakersfield	W 98–71	14–4 (6–2)	17 – Bullock	12 – Bullock	3 – Bullock	Stan Sheriff Center (4,555); Honolulu, HI
January 24, 2026; 7:00 p.m., Spectrum Sports		Cal State Northridge	W 89–68	15–4 (7–2)	18 – Johnson	7 – Tied	8 – Erickson	Stan Sheriff Center (6,025); Honolulu, HI
January 29, 2026; 6:00 p.m., ESPNU		at UC Irvine	L 76–87	15–5 (7–3)	17 – Johnson	11 – Finlinson	8 – Erickson	Bren Events Center (2,873); Irvine, CA
January 31, 2026; 11:00 am, Spectrum SportsNet		at Long Beach State	W 89–82	16–5 (8–3)	26 – Bullock	9 – Bullock	8 – Erickson	Walter Pyramid (1,368); Long Beach, CA
February 7, 2026; 7:00 p.m., Spectrum Sports		UC San Diego	W 72–67	17–5 (9–3)	20 – Johnson	10 – Erickson	6 – Erickson	Stan Sheriff Center (6,171); Honolulu, HI
February 12, 2026; 4:30 p.m., ESPN+		at Cal State Bakersfield	W 89–74	18–5 (10–3)	19 – Bullock	7 – Johnson	4 – Tied	Icardo Center (226); Bakersfield, CA
February 14, 2026; 3:00 p.m., ESPN+		at Cal State Northridge	L 60–84	18–6 (10–4)	13 – Finlinson	7 – Rouhliadeff	4 – Erickson	The Matadome (445); Northridge, CA
February 19, 2026; 7:00 p.m., Spectrum Sports		Cal Poly	L 75–86	18–7 (10–5)	22 – Bullock	9 – Bullock	1 – Tied	Stan Sheriff Center (4,547); Honolulu, HI
February 21, 2026; 5:00 p.m., ESPNU		UC Santa Barbara; AC Carter Night	W 78–75	19–7 (11–5)	21 – Bullock	7 – Bullock	1 – Tied	Stan Sheriff Center (9,246); Honolulu, HI
February 26, 2026; 4:00 p.m., ESPN+		at UC Davis	W 77–73	20–7 (12–5)	16 – Johnson	6 – Erickson	6 – Erickson	The Pavilion (1,821); Davis, CA
February 28, 2026; 2:00 p.m., ESPN+		at Cal State Fullerton	W 87–85	21–7 (13–5)	27 – Bullock	8 – Bullock	4 – Tied	Titan Gym (668); Fullerton, CA
March 5, 2026; 7:00 p.m., Spectrum Sports		UC Riverside	W 93–74	22–7 (14–5)	19 – Nemeikša	6 – Bullock	6 – Erickson	Stan Sheriff Center (4,880); Honolulu, HI
March 7, 2026; 7:00 p.m., Spectrum Sports		Long Beach State	L 75–84	22–8 (14–6)	23 – Erickson	8 – Johnson	2 – Tied	Stan Sheriff Center (6,512); Honolulu, HI
Big West tournament
March 13, 2026; 6:30 p.m., ESPN2	(2)	vs. (3) Cal State Fullerton; Semifinal	W 78–63	23–8	19 – Johnson	10 – Rouhliadeff	5 – Erickson	Lee's Family Forum (2,060); Henderson, NV
March 14, 2026; 5:00 p.m., ESPN2	(2)	vs. (1) UC Irvine; Finals	W 71–64	24–8	22 – Johnson	12 – Rouhliadeff	8 – Erickson	Lee's Family Forum (3,488); Henderson, NV
NCAA tournament
March 19, 2026*; 10:25 a.m., TBS	(13 W)	vs. (4 W) No. 14 Arkansas; First round	L 78–97	24–9	21 – Bullock	8 – Bullock	6 – Erickson	Moda Center (12,104); Portland, OR
*Non-conference game. ^{#}Rankings from AP Poll. (#) Tournament seedings in parentheses. W=West. All times are in Hawaii–Aleutian.
