= Mike Scott (basketball, born 1986) =

American basketball player and coach (born 1986)

Alabama State Hornets
- Title: Assistant Coach
- Conference: SWAC

Personal information
- Born: August 12, 1986 (age 40) Philadelphia, Pennsylvania, U.S.
- Listed height: 6 ft 0 in (1.83 m)
- Listed weight: 180 lb (82 kg)

Career information
- High school: Carbon (Price, Utah)
- College: TCU (2007–2008); College of Eastern Utah (2008–2009); Fairleigh Dickinson (2009–2011)
- Playing career: 2011–2012
- Position: Point guard
- Coaching career: 2012–present

Career history

Playing
- 2011: SVD 49 Dortmund

Coaching
- 2012: Midland (assistant)
- 2012–2013: Fairleigh Dickinson (GA)
- 2013–2014: Wayland Baptist (assistant)
- 2014–2015: Texas A&M International (assistant)
- 2015–2017: Paris (assistant)
- 2017–2025: Cal State Bakersfield (assistant)
- 2025–2026: Cal State Bakersfield (Acting HC)
- 2026–present: Alabama State (assistant)

Mike Scott (born August 12, 1986) is an American basketball coach and former player who is currently an assistant coach for the Alabama State Hornets men's basketball program. He was previously the acting Head Coach at Cal State Bakersfield.

== Playing career ==
A point guard, Scott began his college basketball career at TCU before transferring to Fairleigh Dickinson.

== Coaching career ==
After a brief professional career in Germany's 2. Basketball Bundesliga, Scott returned to the United States, where he served as an assistant coach for several collegiate programs.

=== Cal State Bakersfield (2017–2026) ===
Scott was hired as an assistant coach at Cal State Bakersfield by Rod Barnes in 2017. He was promoted to acting head coach in 2025 following Barnes' abrupt resignation from the program six weeks before the beginning of the 2025–26 season.

On March 26, 2026, Todd Lee was hired to replace Scott as the head coach of the Roadrunners.

=== Alabama State (2026–present) ===
In July 2026, Scott was hired as an assistant coach at Alabama State University.

== Head coaching record ==
Record table
Season	Team	Overall	Conference	Standing	Postseason
Cal State Bakersfield (Big West Conference) (2025–2026)
2025–26	Cal State Bakersfield	8–24	2–18	11th	
Cal State Bakersfield:		8–24 (.250)	2–18 (.100)		
Total:		8–24 (.250)			
National champion Postseason invitational champion Conference regular season champion Conference regular season and conference tournament champion Division regular season champion Division regular season and conference tournament champion Conference tournament champion
