= 2025–26 UC Riverside Highlanders men's basketball team =

American college basketball season

2025–26 UC Riverside Highlanders men's basketball
- Conference: Big West Conference
- Record: 10–22 (5–15 Big West)
- Head coach: Gus Argenal (1st season)
- Assistant coaches: Tim Bross; Blake Wetherington; Reuben Williams; Matthew Musselman
- Home arena: SRC Arena (Capacity: 3,168)

2025–26 Big West Conference men's basketball standings
	Conf.				Overall
Team	W		L	PCT	W		L	PCT
UC Irvine	15	–	5	.750	23	–	12	.657
Hawai'i †	14	–	6	.700	24	–	9	.727
Cal State Fullerton	12	–	8	.600	18	–	16	.529
Cal State Northridge	12	–	8	.600	20	–	14	.588
UC San Diego	12	–	8	.600	23	–	11	.676
UC Davis	11	–	9	.550	19	–	14	.576
UC Santa Barbara	11	–	9	.550	18	–	14	.563
Cal Poly	10	–	10	.500	14	–	19	.424
Long Beach State	6	–	14	.300	10	–	22	.313
UC Riverside	5	–	15	.250	10	–	22	.313
Cal State Bakersfield	2	–	18	.100	8	–	24	.250
† 2026 Big West tournament winner

The 2025–26 UC Riverside Highlanders men's basketball team represented the University of California, Riverside during the 2025–26 NCAA Division I men's basketball season. The Highlanders, led by first-year head coach Gus Argenal, played their home games at the SRC Arena in Riverside, California as members of the Big West Conference. They finished the season 10–22, 5–15 in Big West play to finish in 11th place. They failed to qualify for the Big West tournament.

== Previous season ==
The Highlanders finished the 2024–25 season 21–13, 14–6 in Big West play to finish in a tie for third place. As the No. 3 seed in the Big West tournament, they were upset by Cal Poly in the quarterfinals. They received an invitation to the National Invitation Tournament. There they lost to Santa Clara in the first round.

On March 29, 2025, head coach Mike Magpayo left the team to take the head coaching position at Fordham. On May 1, the school announced that Cal State San Bernardino head coach Gus Argenal would be the team's new head coach.

== Preseason ==
On October 16, 2025, the Big West Conference released their preseason coaches poll. UC Riverside was picked to finish ninth in the conference.

=== Preseason rankings ===
Big West Preseason Poll
Place	Team	Points
1	UC Irvine	98 (8)
2	UC Santa Barbara	93 (3)
3	Hawai'i	76
4	UC San Diego	69
5	Cal State Northridge	63
6	UC Davis	58
7	Cal Poly	54
8	Long Beach State	31
9	UC Riverside	26
10	Cal State Bakersfield	20
11	Cal State Fullerton	17
(#) first-place votes

=== Preseason All-Big West Team ===
No players were named the Preseason All-Big West Team.

== Roster ==
2025–26 UC Riverside Highlanders men's basketball team
Players
Coaches

Pos.	#	Name	Height	Weight	Year	Previous school	Hometown
G	0	Tyler Jones	6 ft 2 in (1.88 m)	—	So	Archbishop Mitty High School	Morgan Hill, California
G	1	De'Undrae Perteete Jr.	6 ft 5 in (1.96 m)	—	So	Westmont	Antioch, California
G	2	EJ Spillman	6 ft 4 in (1.93 m)	—	Fr	Pacifica Christian High School	Long Beach, California
G	7	Parker Strauss	6 ft 4 in (1.93 m)	180 lb (82 kg)	So	Northwestern	Costa Mesa, California
F	8	BJ Kolly	6 ft 10 in (2.08 m)	225 lb (102 kg)	GS	Montana State	Everett, Washington
F	9	Osiris Grady	6 ft 9 in (2.06 m)	215 lb (98 kg)	Jr	Utah Valley	Las Vegas, Nevada
G	10	Marqui Worthy Jr.	6 ft 4 in (1.93 m)	216 lb (98 kg)	Jr	UMass	Anaheim, California
G	12	Andrew Henderson	6 ft 5 in (1.96 m)	210 lb (95 kg)	GS	Cal State San Bernardino	Los Angeles, California
G	13	Ben Waller	6 ft 6 in (1.98 m)	—	Fr	Lavalla Catholic	Traralgon, Australia
F	22	Denzel Hines	6 ft 6 in (1.98 m)	210 lb (95 kg)	Jr	Coastal Carolina	Fontana, California
F	23	Dylan Godfrey	6 ft 8 in (2.03 m)	205 lb (93 kg)	Jr	Canisius	Newport Beach, California
F	32	Amaury McKinney	6 ft 6 in (1.98 m)	—	RS Fr	Jesuit High School	Sacramento, California
C	34	Daniel Tobiloba	7 ft 0 in (2.13 m)	238 lb (108 kg)	Jr	South Florida	Lagos, Nigeria
G	35	Gavin Haase	6 ft 0 in (1.83 m)	—	RS Fr	Palo Alto High School	Palo Alto, California
F	44	Jailen Daniel-Dalton	6 ft 6 in (1.98 m)	220 lb (100 kg)	GS	San Francisco State	Henderson, Nevada

Head coach

- Gus Argenal (UC Davis)

Assistant coach(es)

- Tim Bross (Gonzaga)
- Blake Wetherington (Murray State)
- Reuben Williams (Willamette)
- Matthew Musselman (San Diego)

Legend

- (C) Team captain
- (S) Suspended
- (I) Ineligible
- (W) Walk-on
- Injured
- Current redshirt

Roster
Last update: October 28, 2025

== Schedule and results ==
Date time, TV	Rank^{#}	Opponent^{#}	Result	Record	High points	High rebounds	High assists	Site (attendance) city, state
Regular season
November 3, 2025*; 7:00 pm, ESPN+		La Sierra	W 90–49	1–0	19 – Henderson	8 – Grady	7 – Godfrey	SRC Arena (556); Riverside, CA
November 6, 2025*; 5:00 pm, SLN		at North Dakota	W 74–70	2–0	21 – Worthy Jr.	6 – Grady	5 – Worthy Jr.	Betty Engelstad Sioux Center (1,533); Grand Forks, ND
November 11, 2025*; 6:00 pm, MW Network		at New Mexico	L 68–82	2–1	27 – Henderson	10 – Hines	3 – Worthy Jr.	The Pit (11,689); Albuquerque, NM
November 15, 2025*; 2:00 pm, ESPN+		North Dakota	L 74–76	2–2	20 – Worthy Jr.	11 – Grady	7 – Worthy Jr.	SRC Arena (375); Riverside, CA
November 18, 2025*; 7:00 pm, ESPN+		at California Baptist; Acrisure Series	L 57–80	2–3	15 – Worthy	6 – Worthy	3 – Worthy	Fowler Events Center (3,766); Riverside, CA
November 21, 2025*; 7:00 pm, ESPN+		at San Diego; Acrisure Series	W 85–71	3–3	19 – Kolly	6 – Tied	3 – Tied	Jenny Craig Pavilion (1,589); San Diego, CA
November 24, 2025*; 12:00 pm, ESPN+		Grambling State; Acrisure Series	W 83–74	4–3	34 – Henderson	9 – Tied	3 – Tied	SRC Arena (355); Riverside, CA
November 29, 2025*; 3:00 pm, ESPN+		at Utah Tech	L 69–77	4–4	17 – Grady	5 – Tied	3 – Worthy	Burns Arena (1,107); St. George, UT
December 4, 2025; 7:00 pm, ESPN+		at UC Irvine	L 60–73	4–5 (0–1)	26 – Worthy Jr.	8 – Worthy Jr.	2 – Tied	Bren Events Center (1,441); Irvine, CA
December 6, 2025; 4:00 pm, ESPN+		at Cal Poly	W 88–84	5–5 (1–1)	28 – Henderson	9 – Henderson	4 – Worthy	Mott Athletics Center (1,443); San Luis Obispo, CA
December 13, 2025*; 7:00 pm, ESPN+		at No. 10 BYU	L 53–100	5–6	14 – Henderson	7 – Grady	5 – Perteete Jr.	Marriott Center (17,982); Provo, UT
December 16, 2025*; 7:00 pm, ESPN+		Stanton	W 95–70	6–6	26 – Henderson	18 – Grady	4 – Tied	SRC Arena (255); Riverside, CA
December 20, 2025*; 7:00 pm, SLN		at St. Thomas	L 78–92	6–7	21 – Grady	7 – Tied	5 – Perteete Jr.	Lee & Penny Anderson Arena (1,780); St. Paul, MN
December 23, 2025*; 1:00 pm, BTN		at UCLA	L 65–97	6–8	20 – Grady	7 – Daniel-Dalton	5 – Grady	Pauley Pavilion (4,475); Los Angeles, CA
January 1, 2026; 5:00 pm, ESPN+		Hawai'i	L 45–88	6–9 (1–2)	14 – Worthy Jr.	8 – Kolly	3 – Kolly	SRC Arena (327); Riverside, CA
January 8, 2026; 6:30 pm, ESPN+		at Cal State Bakersfield	L 66–67	6–10 (1–3)	19 – Worthy Jr.	11 – Kolly	2 – Tied	Icardo Center (259); Bakersfield, CA
January 10, 2026; 5:00 pm, ESPN+		UC San Diego	L 66–69	6–11 (1–4)	27 – Henderson	6 – Grady	4 – Kolly	SRC Arena (388); Riverside, CA
January 15, 2026; 7:00 pm, ESPN+		at Long Beach State	L 73–88	6–12 (1–5)	23 – Worthy Jr.	9 – Worthy Jr.	2 – Worthy Jr.	Walter Pyramid (1,213); Long Beach, CA
January 17, 2026; 5:00 pm, ESPN+		Cal State Fullerton	W 81–72	7–12 (2–5)	22 – Worthy Jr.	10 – Kolly	4 – Osiris	SRC Arena (375); Riverside, CA
January 22, 2026; 7:00 pm, ESPN+		UC Irvine	L 66–80	7–13 (2–6)	22 – Worthy Jr.	8 – Kolly	3 – Perteete Jr.	SRC Arena (647); Riverside, CA
January 24, 2026; 2:00 pm, ESPN+		at UC Davis	L 66–74	7–14 (2–7)	18 – Worthy Jr.	9 – Kolly	4 – Henderson	University Credit Union Center (1,502); Davis, CA
January 29, 2026; 7:00 pm, ESPN+		Long Beach State	W 71–61	8–14 (3–7)	19 – Henderson	8 – Grady	5 – Worthy Jr.	SRC Arena (407); Riverside, CA
January 31, 2026; 5:00 pm, ESPN+		Cal Poly	L 87–94	8–15 (3–8)	39 – Henderson	7 – Tied	4 – Worthy Jr.	SRC Arena (276); Riverside, CA
February 5, 2026; 7:00 pm, ESPN+		at Cal State Fullerton	L 72–78	8–16 (3–9)	19 – Henderson	9 – Henderson	4 – Worthy Jr.	Titan Gym (483); Fullerton, CA
February 7, 2026; 5:00 pm, ESPN+		at Cal State Northridge	L 74–88	8–17 (3–10)	36 – Worthy Jr.	8 – Daniel-Dalton	5 – Perteete Jr.	The Matadome (863); Northridge, CA
February 12, 2026; 7:00 pm, ESPN+		UC Santa Barbara	L 68–76	8–18 (3–11)	22 – Henderson	8 – Daniel-Dalton	4 – Tied	SRC Arena (367); Riverside, CA
February 14, 2026; 7:00 pm, ESPN+		at UC San Diego	L 66–72	8–19 (3–12)	21 – Henderson	12 – Kolly	6 – Worthy Jr.	LionTree Arena (1,660); La Jolla, CA
February 19, 2026; 7:00 pm, ESPN+		Cal State Bakersfield	W 93–65	9–19 (4–12)	26 – Henderson	14 – Kolly	5 – Tied	SRC Arena (462); Riverside, CA
February 21, 2026; 5:00 pm, ESPN+		UC Davis	L 73–78	9–20 (4–13)	22 – Henderson	10 – Grady	4 – Tied	SRC Arena (325); Riverside, CA
February 26, 2026; 6:00 pm, ESPN+		at UC Santa Barbara	L 59–70	9–21 (4–14)	17 – Henderson	8 – Grady	4 – Perteete Jr.	The Thunderdome (2,026); Santa Barbara, CA
February 28, 2026; 5:00 pm, ESPN+		Cal State Northridge	W 95–84	10–21 (5–14)	38 – Worthy Jr.	10 – Grady	5 – Worthy Jr.	SRC Arena (346); Riverside, CA
March 5, 2026; 8:59 pm, ESPN+		at Hawai'i	L 74–93	10–22 (5–15)	26 – Henderson	5 – Tied	3 – Tied	Stan Sheriff Center (4,880); Honolulu, HI
*Non-conference game. ^{#}Rankings from AP Poll. (#) Tournament seedings in parentheses. All times are in Pacific.
