= 2025–26 Cal State Bakersfield Roadrunners men's basketball team =

American college basketball season

2025–26 Cal State Bakersfield Roadrunners men's basketball
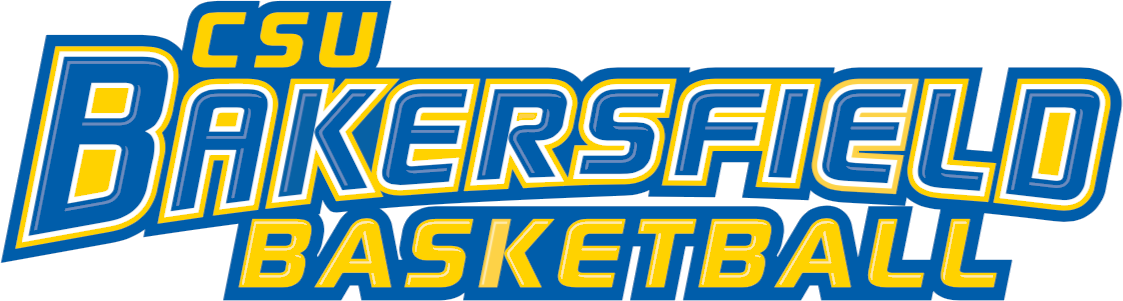
- Conference: Big West Conference
- Record: 8–24 (2–18 Big West)
- Head coach: Mike Scott (acting)
- Assistant coaches: Brandon Barnes; Brent Wrapp
- Home arena: Icardo Center

2025–26 Big West Conference men's basketball standings
	Conf.				Overall
Team	W		L	PCT	W		L	PCT
UC Irvine	15	–	5	.750	22	–	10	.688
Hawai'i	14	–	6	.700	22	–	8	.733
Cal State Fullerton	12	–	8	.600	17	–	15	.531
Cal State Northridge	12	–	8	.600	19	–	13	.594
UC San Diego	12	–	8	.600	22	–	10	.688
UC Davis	11	–	9	.550	18	–	13	.581
UC Santa Barbara	11	–	9	.550	18	–	13	.581
Cal Poly	10	–	10	.500	14	–	18	.438
Long Beach State	6	–	14	.300	10	–	22	.313
UC Riverside	5	–	15	.250	10	–	22	.313
Cal State Bakersfield	2	–	18	.100	8	–	24	.250
† 2026 Big West tournament winner As of March 7, 2026

The 2025–26 Cal State Bakersfield Roadrunners men's basketball team represented California State University, Bakersfield during the 2025–26 NCAA Division I men's basketball season. The Roadrunners, led by interim head coach Mike Scott, played their home games at the Icardo Center located in Bakersfield, California as members of the Big West Conference. They finished the season 8–24, 2–18 in Big West play to finish in last place. They failed to qualify for the Big West tournament.

The season was perhaps most known for a scandal involving temporary assistant coach Kevin Mays, who was arrested and charged with felonies including pimping. On September 24, 2025, prior to the season starting, it was announced that head coach Rod Barnes and athletic director Kyle Condor had left their roles with the school. Assistant coach Mike Scott being named the interim head coach for the season.

== Previous season ==
The Roadrunners finished the 2024–25 season 14–19, 8–12 in Big West play, to finish in a tie for seventh place. They were defeated by UC Santa Barbara in the first round of the Big West tournament.

== Preseason ==
On October 16, 2025, the Big West Conference released their preseason coaches poll. Cal State Bakersfield was picked to finish tenth in the conference.

=== Preseason rankings ===
Big West Preseason Poll
Place	Team	Points
1	UC Irvine	98 (8)
2	UC Santa Barbara	93 (3)
3	Hawaiʻi	76
4	UC San Diego	69
5	Cal State Northridge	63
6	UC Davis	58
7	Cal Poly	54
8	Long Beach State	31
9	UC Riverside	26
10	Cal State Bakersfield	20
11	Cal State Fullerton	17
(#) first-place votes

=== Preseason All-Big West Team ===
No players were named the Preseason All-Big West Team.

== Roster ==
2025–26 Cal State Bakersfield Roadrunners men's basketball team
Players
Coaches

Pos.	#	Name	Height	Weight	Year	Previous school	Hometown
G	0	CJ Hardy	6 ft 3 in (1.91 m)	175 lb (79 kg)	Sr	West LA College	Gardena, California
F	1	Tom Mark	6 ft 7 in (2.01 m)	200 lb (91 kg)	GS	Tallahassee Community College	Affligem, Belgium
G	2	Mike Price	6 ft 3 in (1.91 m)	185 lb (84 kg)	RS Fr	Southern California Academy	Chicago, Illinois
G	3	Dylan Purnell	6 ft 5 in (1.96 m)	185 lb (84 kg)	So	South Plains College	Raleigh, North Carolina
F	4	Caleb McCarty	6 ft 8 in (2.03 m)	195 lb (88 kg)	GS	South Carolina State	Biloxi, Mississippi
G	5	Bentley Waller	6 ft 4 in (1.93 m)	185 lb (84 kg)	RS Fr	Bakersfield Christian High School	Bakersfield, California
C	7	Pierre Genesté Jr.	6 ft 11 in (2.11 m)	220 lb (100 kg)	Sr	Fresno State	Port-au-Prince, Haiti
G/F	10	AJ George	6 ft 5 in (1.96 m)	210 lb (95 kg)	Sr	SMU	Fresno, California
F	11	Colin Darby	6 ft 7 in (2.01 m)	200 lb (91 kg)	So	Dynamic Prep	Frisco, Texas
G	12	Kadar Waller	5 ft 11 in (1.8 m)	185 lb (84 kg)	GS	Mississippi Valley State	Bakersfield, California
G	15	Dailin Smith	6 ft 6 in (1.98 m)	195 lb (88 kg)	Sr	Alabama A&M	Colorado Springs, Colorado
F	21	Ronald Jessamy	6 ft 8 in (2.03 m)	220 lb (100 kg)	Jr	Tennessee State	Philadelphia, Pennsylvania
G/F	25	Jaden Alexander	6 ft 4 in (1.93 m)	210 lb (95 kg)	RS Jr	New Mexico State	Fairfield, California
G	40	Tory James Jr.	6 ft 1 in (1.85 m)	175 lb (79 kg)	Fr	Grosse Pointe South High School	The Woodlands, Texas

Head coach

- Mike Scott (interim) (Fairleigh Dickinson)

Assistant coach(es)

- Brandon Barnes (Cal State Bakersfield)
- Brent Wrapp (Cal State Bakersfield)

Legend

- (C) Team captain
- (S) Suspended
- (I) Ineligible
- (W) Walk-on
- Injured
- Current redshirt

Roster

== Schedule and results ==
Date time, TV	Rank^{#}	Opponent^{#}	Result	Record	High points	High rebounds	High assists	Site (attendance) city, state
Regular season
November 3, 2025*; 7:00 pm, ACCNX		at California	L 60–87	0–1	16 – Tied	7 – Jessamy	3 – Tied	Haas Pavilion (3,143); Berkeley, CA
November 6, 2025*; 11:00 am, ESPN+		Whittier	W 83–61	1–1	17 – Hardy	13 – Geneste Jr.	4 – K. Waller	Icardo Center (1,735); Bakersfield, CA
November 11, 2025*; 6:30 pm, ESPN+		Western Illinois	W 74–58	2–1	18 – Hardy	9 – Hardy	3 – Hardy	Icardo Center (394); Bakersfield, CA
November 14, 2025*; 4:30 pm, SECN+		at Ole Miss; Rod Barnes Tad Pad game	L 60–82	2–2	21 – Hardy	7 – Tied	4 – Hardy	Tad Smith Coliseum (4,362); Oxford, MS
November 17, 2025*; 7:00 pm, ESPN+		at Portland State	L 80–93	2–3	30 – Smith	7 – Mark	7 – Hardy	Viking Pavilion (685); Portland, OR
November 22, 2025*; 1:00 pm, ESPN+		Mississippi Valley State	W 86–70	3–3	23 – Smith	11 – Jessamy	3 – Tied	Icardo Center (309); Bakersfield, CA
November 25, 2025*; 4:00 pm, ACCNX		at Florida State	L 59–89	3–4	14 – Jessamy	10 – Tied	4 – Tied	Donald L. Tucker Center (3,567); Tallahassee, FL
November 30, 2025*; 4:00 pm, ESPN+		vs. Fresno State; Return to Selland	W 76–71	4–4	30 – Smith	6 – Tied	3 – Hardy	Selland Arena (4,374); Fresno, CA
December 4, 2025; 7:00 pm, ESPN+		at Cal State Northridge	L 66–87	4–5 (0–1)	18 – Smith	9 – George	2 – Tied	The Matadome (715); Northridge, CA
December 6, 2025; 6:00 pm, ESPN+		at UC Santa Barbara	L 84–109	4–6 (0–2)	23 – Hardy	4 – Tied	5 – Hardy	The Thunderdome (1,739); Santa Barbara, CA
December 11, 2025*; 6:30 pm, ESPN+		North Dakota State	L 69–80	4–7	18 – Jessamy	7 – Geneste	3 – Hardy	Icardo Center (223); Bakersfield, CA
December 13, 2025*; 6:30 pm, ESPN+		Pepperdine	L 62–70	4–8	16 – Tied	8 – Tied	1 – Tied	Icardo Center (402); Bakersfield, CA
December 18, 2025*; 6:30 pm, ESPN+		Nobel	W 97–66	5–8	20 – Jessamy	5 – Tied	4 – Waller	Icardo Center (140); Bakersfield, CA
December 23, 2025*; 2:00 pm, ESPN+		Idaho	W 64–63	6–8	20 – Hardy	13 – Geneste Jr.	4 – George	Icardo Center (259); Bakersfield, CA
January 1, 2026; 2:00 pm, ESPN+		UC Irvine	L 77–81	6–9 (0–3)	25 – Jessamy	12 – Jessamy	3 – Tied	Icardo Center (305); Bakersfield, CA
January 3, 2026; 2:00 pm, ESPN+		at UC Davis	W 81–79	7–9 (1–3)	35 – Alexander	11 – Alexander	3 – Tied	The Pavilion (1,068); Davis, CA
January 8, 2026; 6:30 pm, ESPN+		UC Riverside	W 67–66	8–9 (2–3)	30 – Smith	13 – Jessamy	3 – Tied	Icardo Center (259); Bakersfield, CA
January 10, 2026; 4:00 pm, ESPN+		at Long Beach State	L 75–81	8–10 (2–4)	29 – Alexander	7 – Alexander	8 – Waller	Walter Pyramid (1,188); Long Beach, CA
January 15, 2026; 6:30 pm, ESPN+		UC Santa Barbara	L 69–75	8–11 (2–5)	14 – Price	8 – Jessamy	2 – Tied	Icardo Center (284); Bakersfield, CA
January 17, 2026; 6:30 pm, ESPN+		UC San Diego	L 62–83	8–12 (2–6)	19 – Mark	18 – Geneste Jr.	3 – Waller	Icardo Center (123); Bakersfield, CA
January 22, 2026; 7:00 pm, ESPN+		at Hawaiʻi	L 71–98	8–13 (2–7)	28 – Smith	8 – George	3 – Waller	Stan Sheriff Center (4,555); Honolulu, HI
January 29, 2026; 6:30 pm, ESPN+		Cal Poly	L 79–104	8–14 (2–8)	25 – Smith	9 – Geneste Jr.	5 – Waller	Icardo Center (535); Bakersfield, CA
January 31, 2026; 2:00 pm, ESPN+		UC Davis	L 72–80	8–15 (2–9)	24 – Price	9 – Geneste Jr.	6 – Waller	Icardo Center (768); Bakersfield, CA
February 5, 2026; 7:00 pm, ESPN+		at UC Irvine	L 62–78	8–16 (2–10)	18 – Tied	12 – Tied	7 – Waller	Bren Events Center (2,301); Irvine, CA
February 7, 2026; 4:00 pm, ESPN+		at Cal State Fullerton	L 66–82	8–17 (2–11)	19 – Jessamy	11 – Jessamy	5 – Tied	Titan Gym (403); Fullerton, CA
February 12, 2026; 6:30 pm, ESPN+		Hawaiʻi	L 74–89	8–18 (2–12)	23 – George	7 – Geneste Jr.	3 – George	Icardo Center (226); Bakersfield, CA
February 19, 2026; 7:00 pm, ESPN+		at UC Riverside	L 65–93	8–19 (2–13)	15 – Smith	5 – Purnell	4 – Hardy	SRC Arena (462); Riverside, CA
February 21, 2026; 6:30 pm, ESPN+		Cal State Fullerton	L 80–88	8–20 (2–14)	21 – Smith	7 – Mark	3 – Tied	Icardo Center (482); Bakersfield, CA
February 26, 2026; 7:00 pm, ESPN+		at UC San Diego	L 72–84	8–21 (2–15)	40 – Jessamy	9 – Jessamy	4 – Waller	LionTree Arena (1,694); La Jolla, CA
February 28, 2026; 6:30 pm, ESPN+		Long Beach State	L 87–88	8–22 (2–16)	33 – Jessamy	11 – Jessamy	6 – Hardy	Icardo Center (517); Bakersfield, CA
March 5, 2026; 6:30 pm, ESPN+		Cal State Northridge	L 84–86	8–23 (2–17)	23 – Tied	9 – Jessamy	6 – Waller	Icardo Center (356); Bakersfield, CA
March 7, 2026; 4:00 pm, ESPN+		at Cal Poly	L 76–108	8–24 (2–18)	24 – Smith	11 – Jessamy	3 – Tied	Mott Athletics Center; San Luis Obispo, CA
*Non-conference game. ^{#}Rankings from AP Poll. (#) Tournament seedings in parentheses. All times are in Pacific.
