= 2024–25 Hawaii Rainbow Warriors basketball team =

American college basketball season

2024–25 Hawaii Rainbow Warriors basketball

Outrigger Rainbow Classic champions
- Conference: Big West Conference
- Record: 15–16 (7–13 Big West)
- Head coach: Eran Ganot (10th season)
- Associate head coach: Brad Davidson
- Assistant coaches: Rob Jones; Gibson Johnson; Cullen Neal
- Home arena: Stan Sheriff Center (Capacity: 10,300)

2024–25 Big West men's basketball standings
| | Conf. | | | | Overall |
| Team | W | | L | PCT | W | | L | PCT |
|---|---|---|---|---|---|---|---|---|
| UC San Diego † | 18 | – | 2 | .900 | 30 | – | 5 | .857 |
| UC Irvine | 17 | – | 3 | .850 | 32 | – | 7 | .821 |
| UC Riverside | 14 | – | 6 | .700 | 21 | – | 13 | .618 |
| Cal State Northridge | 14 | – | 6 | .700 | 22 | – | 11 | .667 |
| UC Santa Barbara | 11 | – | 9 | .550 | 21 | – | 13 | .618 |
| UC Davis | 9 | – | 11 | .450 | 15 | – | 17 | .469 |
| Cal Poly | 8 | – | 12 | .400 | 16 | – | 19 | .457 |
| Cal State Bakersfield | 8 | – | 12 | .400 | 14 | – | 19 | .424 |
| Hawai'i | 7 | – | 13 | .350 | 15 | – | 16 | .484 |
| Long Beach State | 3 | – | 17 | .150 | 7 | – | 25 | .219 |
| Cal State Fullerton | 1 | – | 19 | .050 | 6 | – | 26 | .188 |
† 2025 Big West tournament winner

The 2024–25 Hawaii Rainbow Warriors basketball team represented the University of Hawaiʻi at Mānoa during the 2024–25 NCAA Division I men's basketball season. The Rainbow Warriors, led by tenth-year head coach Eran Ganot, played their home games at SimpliFi Arena at Stan Sheriff Center located in Honolulu, Hawaii as members of the Big West Conference.

With a loss to CSUN on March 8, the Rainbow Warriors failed to qualify for a postseason conference tournament for the first time since 2009–10.

== Previous season ==
The Rainbow Warriors finished the 2023–24 season 20–14, 11–9 in Big West play to finish in fourth place. They defeated Cal State Northridge, before falling to UC Davis in the semifinals of the Big West tournament. Despite a second consecutive 20-win season, the team decided to not pursue a postseason bid.

== Roster ==
2024–25 Hawaii Rainbow Warriors men's basketball team
Players
Coaches

| Pos. | # | Name | Height | Weight | Year | Previous school | Hometown |
|---|---|---|---|---|---|---|---|
| G | 0 | Kody Williams | 6 ft 0 in (1.83 m) | 190 lb (86 kg) | Jr | South Kent School | Minnetonka, Minnesota |
| G | 2 | Tom Beattie | 6 ft 5 in (1.96 m) | 195 lb (88 kg) | So | Rosmini College | Auckland, New Zealand |
| G | 4 | Marcus Greene | 6 ft 2 in (1.88 m) | 175 lb (79 kg) | Sr | Houston Christian | Gilroy, California |
| F | 5 | Gytis Nemeikša | 6 ft 8 in (2.03 m) | 220 lb (100 kg) | Sr | Xavier | Kaunas, Lithuania |
| G | 6 | Osahon Obasohan | 6 ft 4 in (1.93 m) | 220 lb (100 kg) | So | Espoirs Le Mans | Antwerp, Belgium |
| G | 8 | AJ Economou | 6 ft 5 in (1.96 m) | 180 lb (82 kg) | RS Fr | Southern California Academy | Santa Monica, California |
| G | 10 | Logan Robeson | 6 ft 3 in (1.91 m) | 190 lb (86 kg) | RS Fr | Campolindo High School | Moraga, California |
| G | 11 | Jacopo Van der Knaap | 6 ft 5 in (1.96 m) | 200 lb (91 kg) | Fr | Tobarra CB | Verona, Italy |
| F | 13 | Roy Igwe | 6 ft 7 in (2.01 m) | 225 lb (102 kg) | Fr | St. Mary's International School | Tokyo, Japan |
| F | 14 | Harry Rouhliadeff | 6 ft 9 in (2.06 m) | 230 lb (104 kg) | Jr | Villanova College | Brisbane, Australia |
| F/C | 20 | Jerome Palm | 6 ft 10 in (2.08 m) | 225 lb (102 kg) | GS | Valparaiso | Almere, Netherlands |
| G | 22 | Ryan Rapp | 6 ft 5 in (1.96 m) | 185 lb (84 kg) | Sr | Washington State | Melbourne, Australia |
| G | 30 | Aaron Hunkin-Claytor | 6 ft 2 in (1.88 m) | 165 lb (75 kg) | Fr | Salesian College Prep | Wahiawa, Hawaii |
| C | 32 | Tanner Christensen | 6 ft 10 in (2.08 m) | 265 lb (120 kg) | GS | Utah Tech | Spokane Valley, Washington |
| F | 34 | Akira Jacobs | 6 ft 10 in (2.08 m) | 220 lb (100 kg) | So | NBA Global Academy | Yokohama, Japan |

Head coach

- Eran Ganot (Swarthmore)

Assistant coach(es)

- Brad Davidson (Sydney)
- Rob Jones (Saint Mary's)
- Gibson Johnson (Hawaiʻi)
- Cullen Neal (Saint Mary's)

Legend

- (C) Team captain
- (S) Suspended
- (I) Ineligible
- (W) Walk-on
- Injured
- Current redshirt

Roster
Last update: October 28, 2024

== Schedule and results ==
| Date time, TV | Rank^{#} | Opponent^{#} | Result | Record | High points | High rebounds | High assists | Site (attendance) city, state |
Exhibition
| October 25, 2024*; 7:00 p.m. | | at Hawaii–Hilo | W 64–61 | – | 14 – Nemeikša | 11 – Christensen | 4 – Beattie | Afook-Chinen Civic Auditorium (1,987); Hilo, HI |
| November 2, 2024*; 5:00 p.m. | | vs. Chaminade | W 85–80 | – | 20 – Jacobs | 17 – Christensen | 4 – Hunkin-Claytor | Ka'ulaheanuiokamoku Gym (301); Pukalani, HI |
Regular season
| November 8, 2024*; 7:00 p.m., Spectrum Sports | | Life Pacific; Outrigger Rainbow Classic | W 96–61 | 1–0 | 20 – Jacobs | 9 – Nemeikša | 3 – Tied | Stan Sheriff Center (4,221); Honolulu, HI |
| November 10, 2024*; 5:00 p.m., Spectrum Sports | | San Jose State; Outrigger Rainbow Classic | W 80–69 | 2–0 | 20 – Christensen | 8 – Christensen | 4 – Greene | Stan Sheriff Center (4,580); Honolulu, HI |
| November 11, 2024*; 7:00 p.m., Spectrum Sports | | Pacific; Outrigger Rainbow Classic | W 76–66 | 3–0 | 18 – Tied | 10 – Nemeikša | 2 – Tied | Stan Sheriff Center (4,313); Honolulu, HI |
| November 17, 2024*; 5:00 p.m., Spectrum Sports | | Weber State | W 73–68 ^{OT} | 4–0 | 25 – Christensen | 8 – Nemeikša | 4 – Beattie | Stan Sheriff Center (4,433); Honolulu, HI |
| November 22, 2024*; 7:30 p.m., ESPN2 | | No. 10 North Carolina | L 69–87 | 4–1 | 16 – Nemeikša | 10 – Tied | 4 – Greene | Stan Sheriff Center (8,948); Honolulu, HI |
| November 26, 2024*; 7:00 p.m., Spectrum Sports | | Hawaii Pacific | W 67–63 | 5–1 | 24 – Williams | 10 – Christensen | 3 – Beattie | Stan Sheriff Center (4,089); Honolulu, HI |
| December 3, 2024*; 4:00 p.m., ESPN+ | | at Grand Canyon | L 72–78 | 5–2 | 24 – Nemeikša | 8 – Rouhliadeff | 4 – Rapp | Global Credit Union Arena (7,004); Phoenix, AZ |
| December 7, 2024; 11:00 a.m., Spectrum SportsNet | | at Long Beach State | L 68–76 | 5–3 (0–1) | 17 – Greene | 10 – Christensen | 4 – Hunkin-Claytor | Walter Pyramid (1,446); Long Beach, CA |
| December 14, 2024*; 7:00 p.m., Spectrum Sports | | Texas A&M–Corpus Christi | W 71–62 | 6–3 | 19 – Rapp | 6 – Tied | 3 – Rapp | Stan Sheriff Center (4,614); Honolulu, HI |
| December 22, 2024*; 6:00 p.m., ESPN2 | | Charlotte; Diamond Head Classic first round | W 78–61 | 7–3 | 24 – Nemeikša | 8 – Christensen | 3 – Tied | Stan Sheriff Center (5,049); Honolulu, HI |
| December 23, 2024*; 5:30 p.m., ESPN2 | | Nebraska; Diamond Head Classic semifinals | L 55–69 | 7–4 | 11 – Greene | 4 – Tied | 2 – Williams | Stan Sheriff Center (N/A); Honolulu, HI |
| December 25, 2024*; 1:30 p.m., ESPN2 | | Oakland; Diamond Head Classic 3rd place game | W 73–70 ^{OT} | 8–4 | 25 – Nemeikša | 11 – Tied | 4 – Hunkin-Claytor | Stan Sheriff Center (5,086); Honolulu, HI |
| January 2, 2025; 7:00 p.m., Spectrum Sports | | UC Santa Barbara | L 61–64 | 8–5 (0–2) | 15 – Christensen | 8 – Nemeikša | 2 – Tied | Stan Sheriff Center (4,753); Honolulu, HI |
| January 4, 2025; 7:00 p.m., Spectrum Sports | | Cal Poly | W 68–55 | 9–5 (1–2) | 19 – Nemeikša | 10 – Christensen | 4 – Tied | Stan Sheriff Center (4,763); Honolulu, HI |
| January 9, 2025; 5:00 p.m., ESPN+ | | at UC Riverside | W 83–76 | 10–5 (2–2) | 18 – Christensen | 9 – Christensen | 6 – Williams | SRC Arena (1,235); Riverside, CA |
| January 11, 2025; 11:00 a.m., Spectrum SportsNet | | at Cal State Fullerton | W 95–86 | 11–5 (3–2) | 20 – Nemeikša | 8 – Nemeikša | 4 – Beattie | Titan Gym (513); Fullerton, CA |
| January 16, 2025; 7:00 p.m., Spectrum Sports | | Cal State Northridge | L 60–83 | 11–6 (3–3) | 10 – Hunkin-Claytor | 4 – Tied | 3 – Tied | Stan Sheriff Center (4,237); Honolulu, HI |
| January 18, 2025; 7:00 p.m., Spectrum Sports | | Cal State Bakersfield | W 81–70 | 12–6 (4–3) | 17 – Tied | 9 – Christensen | 4 – Hunkin-Claytor | Stan Sheriff Center (5,803); Honolulu, HI |
| January 23, 2025; 4:00 p.m., ESPN+ | | at UC Davis | L 66–68 | 12–7 (4–4) | 21 – Rouhliadeff | 8 – Christensen | 5 – Williams | University Credit Union Center (1,478); Davis, CA |
| January 25, 2025; 5:00 p.m., ESPN+ | | at UC Irvine | L 55–71 | 12–8 (4–5) | 12 – Jacobs | 8 – Nemeiksa | 3 – Jacobs | Bren Events Center (3,148); Irvine, CA |
| January 30, 2025; 7:00 p.m., Spectrum Sports | | UC San Diego | L 63–74 | 12–9 (4–6) | 11 – Tied | 7 – Christensen | 4 – Hunkin-Claytor | Stan Sheriff Center (4,218); Honolulu, HI |
| February 1, 2025; 7:00 p.m., Spectrum Sports | | Cal State Fullerton | W 82–57 | 13–9 (5–6) | 14 – Tied | 11 – Rouhliadeff | 5 – Beattie | Stan Sheriff Center (5,518); Honolulu, HI |
| February 6, 2025; 5:00 p.m., Spectrum SportsNet | | at Cal Poly | L 63–79 | 13–10 (5–7) | 13 – Nemeikša | 5 – Tied | 3 – Hunkin-Claytor | Mott Athletics Center (1,756); San Luis Obispo, CA |
| February 8, 2025; 5:00 p.m., ESPN+ | | at UC Santa Barbara | L 72–76 | 13–11 (5–8) | 23 – Christensen | 8 – Christensen | 4 – Hunkin-Claytor | The Thunderdome (2,109); Santa Barbara, CA |
| February 13, 2025; 7:00 p.m., Spectrum Sports | | Long Beach State | W 62–60 | 14–11 (6–8) | 10 – Tied | 9 – Rouhliadeff | 3 – Beattie | Stan Sheriff Center (4,358); Honolulu, HI |
| February 15, 2025; 7:00 p.m., Spectrum Sports | | UC Irvine | L 49–66 | 14–12 (6–9) | 11 – Christensen | 8 – Rapp | 3 – Hunkin-Claytor | Stan Sheriff Center (5,475); Honolulu, HI |
| February 22, 2025; 5:00 p.m., ESPN+ | | at UC San Diego | L 44–83 | 14–13 (6–10) | 9 – Rapp | 6 – Rouhliadeff | 3 – Hunkin-Claytor | LionTree Arena (3,084); La Jolla, CA |
| February 27, 2025; 7:00 p.m., Spectrum Sports | | UC Riverside | L 76–82 | 14–14 (6–11) | 17 – Nemeikša | 7 – Christensen | 5 – Hunkin-Claytor | Stan Sheriff Center (4,229); Honolulu, HI |
| March 1, 2025; 7:00 p.m., Spectrum Sports | | UC Davis | W 78–70 | 15–14 (7–11) | 16 – Christensen | 9 – Christensen | 6 – Hunkin-Claytor | Stan Sheriff Center (5,088); Honolulu, HI |
| March 6, 2025; 4:30 p.m., ESPN+ | | at Cal State Bakersfield | L 64–76 | 15–15 (7–12) | 21 – Nemeikša | 8 – Rapp | 8 – Hunkin-Claytor | Icardo Center (1,158); Bakersfield, CA |
| March 8, 2025; 3:00 p.m., ESPN+ | | at Cal State Northridge | L 73–82 | 15–16 (7–13) | 20 – Nemeikša | 6 – Christensen | 4 – Greene | Premier America Credit Union Arena (2,055); Northridge, CA |
*Non-conference game. ^{#}Rankings from AP Poll. (#) Tournament seedings in parentheses. All times are in Hawaii–Aleutian.
