= 2025–26 UC Davis Aggies men's basketball team =

American college basketball season

2025–26 UC Davis Aggies men's basketball
- Conference: Big West Conference
- Record: 19–14 (11–9 Big West)
- Head coach: Jim Les (15th season)
- Associate head coach: Kevin Nosek
- Assistant coaches: Kyle Vogt; Jonathan Metzger-Jones; Fortune Solomon; Mike Kosich
- Home arena: University Credit Union Center

2025–26 Big West Conference men's basketball standings
| | Conf. | | | | Overall |
| Team | W | | L | PCT | W | | L | PCT |
|---|---|---|---|---|---|---|---|---|
| UC Irvine | 15 | – | 5 | .750 | 23 | – | 11 | .676 |
| Hawai'i † | 14 | – | 6 | .700 | 24 | – | 8 | .750 |
| Cal State Fullerton | 12 | – | 8 | .600 | 18 | – | 16 | .529 |
| Cal State Northridge | 12 | – | 8 | .600 | 20 | – | 14 | .588 |
| UC San Diego | 12 | – | 8 | .600 | 23 | – | 11 | .676 |
| UC Davis | 11 | – | 9 | .550 | 19 | – | 14 | .576 |
| UC Santa Barbara | 11 | – | 9 | .550 | 18 | – | 14 | .563 |
| Cal Poly | 10 | – | 10 | .500 | 14 | – | 19 | .424 |
| Long Beach State | 6 | – | 14 | .300 | 10 | – | 22 | .313 |
| UC Riverside | 5 | – | 15 | .250 | 10 | – | 22 | .313 |
| Cal State Bakersfield | 2 | – | 18 | .100 | 8 | – | 24 | .250 |
† 2026 Big West tournament winner As of March 14, 2026

The 2025–26 UC Davis Aggies men's basketball team represented the University of California, Davis during the 2025–26 NCAA Division I men's basketball season. The Aggies, led by 15th-year head coach Jim Les, played their home games at the University Credit Union Center in Davis, California, as members of the Big West Conference.

This was the Aggies' last season as members of the Big West Conference, as they will be joining the Mountain West Conference in all sports except football, effective July 1, 2026.

== Previous season ==
The Aggies finished the 2024–25 season 15–17, 9–11 in Big West play, to finish in sixth place. They were defeated by Cal Poly in the first round of the Big West tournament.

== Preseason ==
On October 16, 2025, the Big West Conference released their preseason coaches poll. UC Davis was picked to finish sixth in the conference.

=== Preseason rankings ===
Big West Preseason Poll
| Place | Team | Points |
|---|---|---|
| 1 | UC Irvine | 98 (8) |
| 2 | UC Santa Barbara | 93 (3) |
| 3 | Hawai'i | 76 |
| 4 | UC San Diego | 69 |
| 5 | Cal State Northridge | 63 |
| 6 | UC Davis | 58 |
| 7 | Cal Poly | 54 |
| 8 | Long Beach State | 31 |
| 9 | UC Riverside | 26 |
| 10 | Cal State Bakersfield | 20 |
| 11 | Cal State Fullerton | 17 |
(#) first-place votes

=== Preseason All-Big West Team ===
No players were named the Preseason All-Big West Team.

== Roster ==
2025–26 UC Davis Aggies men's basketball team
Players
Coaches

| Pos. | # | Name | Height | Weight | Year | Previous school | Hometown |
|---|---|---|---|---|---|---|---|
| G | 0 | Brayden Fagbemi | 6 ft 0 in (1.83 m) | 185 lb (84 kg) | Jr | Central Arkansas | Naperville, Illinois |
| G | 1 | Carl Daughtery Jr. | 6 ft 3 in (1.91 m) | 200 lb (91 kg) | Sr | Central Arkansas | Maumelle, Arkansas |
| G | 2 | Marcus Wilson | 6 ft 3 in (1.91 m) | 180 lb (82 kg) | RS Fr | Washington State | Albuquerque, New Mexico |
| G | 4 | Connor Sevilla | 6 ft 0 in (1.83 m) | 175 lb (79 kg) | Jr | Dougherty Valley High School | San Ramon, California |
| G | 5 | Jalen Stokes | 6 ft 5 in (1.96 m) | 205 lb (93 kg) | Fr | Dougherty Valley High School | Oakland, California |
| F | 7 | Niko Rocak | 6 ft 9 in (2.06 m) | 230 lb (104 kg) | GS | UC Santa Barbara | Geneva, Switzerland |
| G | 8 | Chase Rawlins | 6 ft 5 in (1.96 m) | 170 lb (77 kg) | Fr | Folsom High School | Folsom, California |
| G | 10 | Cyril "CJ" Franklin Jr. | 6 ft 5 in (1.96 m) | 175 lb (79 kg) | So | College of Southern Nevada | Las Vegas, Nevada |
| G | 11 | Ylan Esso-Essis | 6 ft 8 in (2.03 m) | 220 lb (100 kg) | So | Modesto Junior College | Le Mans, France |
| C | 13 | Jonathan Noudjihidi | 6 ft 11 in (2.11 m) | 225 lb (102 kg) | Jr | Coahoma Community College | N'Djamena, Chad |
| F | 14 | Abdullah Amzil | 6 ft 7 in (2.01 m) | 210 lb (95 kg) | Fr | Drive Basketball Academy | Helsinki, Finland |
| F | 20 | Isaiah Chappell | 6 ft 9 in (2.06 m) | 225 lb (102 kg) | So | Crossroads School | Los Angeles, California |
| F | 21 | Omer Suljanovic | 6 ft 8 in (2.03 m) | 210 lb (95 kg) | Fr | UCC Assigeco Piacenza | Vienna, Austria |
| G | 36 | Nils Cooper | 6 ft 6 in (1.98 m) | 185 lb (84 kg) | Jr | Pepperdine | Santa Monica, California |

Head coach

- Jim Les (Bradley)

Assistant coach(es)

- Kevin Nosek (UC Davis)
- Kyle Vogt (Lakeland)
- Jonathan Metzger-Jones (Pacific)
- Fortune Solomon (Cal State Bakersfield)
- Mike Kosich (Montana State Billings)

Legend

- (C) Team captain
- (S) Suspended
- (I) Ineligible
- (W) Walk-on
- Injured
- Current redshirt

Roster
Last update: October 28, 2025

== Schedule and results ==
| Date time, TV | Rank^{#} | Opponent^{#} | Result | Record | High points | High rebounds | High assists | Site (attendance) city, state |
Regular season
| November 3, 2025*; 5:00 pm, ESPN+ | | Menlo | W 96–69 | 1–0 | 18 – N. Cooper | 6 – Tied | 4 – Tied | The Pavilion (877); Davis, CA |
| November 5, 2025*; 6:00 pm, ESPN+ | | North Dakota State | W 80–68 | 2–0 | 26 – C. Sevilla | 5 – O. Suljanovic | 6 – M. Wilson | The Pavilion (893); Davis, CA |
| November 9, 2025*; 2:00 pm, ESPN+ | | at Portland | L 63–67 | 2–1 | 14 – I. Chappell | 7 – I. Chappell | 7 – B. Fagbemi | Chiles Center (948); Portland, OR |
| November 14, 2025*; 6:00 pm, ESPN+ | | Sacramento State | W 77–73 | 3–1 | 20 – C. Sevilla | 8 – N. Rocak | 5 – Tied | The Pavilion (3,786); Davis, CA |
| November 18, 2025*; 7:00 pm, MW Network | | at Nevada; Acrisure Series | W 75–71 | 4–1 | 26 – N. Cooper | 6 – I. Chappell | 4 – N. Cooper | Lawlor Events Center (6,957); Reno, NV |
| November 21, 2025*; 6:00 pm, ESPN+ | | at Colorado; Acrisure Series | L 79–95 | 4–2 | 21 – M. Wilson | 9 – N. Cooper | 9 – B. Hargress | CU Events Center (5,209); Boulder, CO |
| November 24, 2025*; 6:00 pm, ESPN+ | | Louisiana; Acrisure Series | W 77–56 | 5–2 | 18 – N. Cooper | 5 – Tied | 2 – Tied | The Pavilion (1,316); Davis, CA |
| December 4, 2025; 9:00 pm, ESPN+ | | at Hawai'i | L 69–75 | 5–3 (0–1) | 17 – C. Sevilla | 8 – N. Rocak | 5 – M. Wilson | Stan Sheriff Center (4,219); Honolulu, HI |
| December 13, 2025*; 1:00 pm, BTN | | at Oregon | L 62–104 | 5–4 | 15 – C. Daughtery Jr. | 5 – N. Rocak | 4 – B. Fagbemi | Matthew Knight Arena (5,299); Eugene, OR |
| December 17, 2025*; 6:00 pm, ESPN+ | | Seattle | L 78–79 | 5–5 | 20 – I. Chappell | 5 – Tied | 7 – M. Wilson | The Pavilion (961); Davis, CA |
| December 21, 2025*; 4:00 pm, ESPN+ | | at Idaho State | W 93–83 | 6–5 | 18 – C. Sevilla | 7 – I. Chappell | 5 – M. Wilson | Reed Gym (1,066); Pocatello, ID |
| December 28, 2025*; 2:00 pm, ESPN+ | | Pacific Union | W 108–52 | 7–5 | 19 – N. Cooper | 13 – O. Suljanovic | 5 – I. Chappell | The Pavilion (901); Davis, CA |
| January 1, 2026; 2:00 pm, ESPN+ | | Cal State Northridge | W 89–80 | 8–5 (1–1) | 23 – C. Sevilla | 8 – N. Rocak | 6 – B. Fagbemi | The Pavilion (923); Davis, CA |
| January 3, 2026; 2:00 pm, ESPN+ | | Cal State Bakersfield | L 79–81 | 8–6 (1–2) | 15 – I. Chappell | 7 – N. Cooper | 8 – B. Fagbemi | The Pavilion (1,068); Davis, CA |
| January 8, 2026; 6:00 pm, ESPN+ | | at UC Santa Barbara | W 93-86 | 9–6 (2–2) | 19 – Cooper | 7 – Fagbemi | 5 – Fagbemi | The Thunderdome (2,091); Santa Barbara, CA |
| January 10, 2026; 2:00 pm, ESPN+ | | at Cal Poly | L 78–84 | 9–7 (2–3) | 18 – Daughtery Jr. | 7 – Cooper | 5 – Cooper | Mott Athletics Center (2,483); San Luis Obispo, CA |
| January 15, 2026; 6:00 pm, ESPN+ | | Cal State Fullerton | W 74–69 | 10–7 (3–3) | 16 – Rocak | 9 – Wilson | 6 – Fagbemi | The Pavilion (1,133); Davis, CA |
| January 17, 2026; 2:00 pm, ESPN+ | | UC Irvine | W 75–72 | 11–7 (4–3) | 17 – Rocak | 6 – Tied | 5 – Rocak | The Pavilion (1,413); Davis, CA |
| January 22, 2026; 6:00 pm, ESPN+ | | UC San Diego | L 74–80 | 11–8 (4–4) | 17 – Wilson | 11 – Rocak | 5 – Wilson | The Pavilion (1,475); Davis, CA |
| January 24, 2026; 2:00 pm, ESPN+ | | UC Riverside | W 74–66 | 12–8 (5–4) | 19 – Cooper | 7 – Cooper | 5 – Rocak | The Pavilion (1,502); Davis, CA |
| January 29, 2026; 7:00 pm, ESPN+ | | at Cal State Northridge | L 78–94 | 12–9 (5–5) | 15 – Sevilla | 8 – Chappell | 8 – Wilson | The Matadome (625); Northridge, CA |
| January 31, 2026; 2:00 pm, ESPN+ | | at Cal State Bakersfield | W 80–72 | 13–9 (6–5) | 22 – Sevilla | 5 – Stokes | 5 – Wilson | Icardo Center (768); Bakersfield, CA |
| February 5, 2026; 6:00 pm, ESPN+ | | UC Santa Barbara | W 85-75 | 14–9 (7–5) | 24 – Wilson | 6 – Wilson | 6 – Wilson | The Pavilion (1,811); Davis, CA |
| February 7, 2026; 2:00 pm, ESPN+ | | Cal Poly | W 67–58 | 15–9 (8–5) | 24 – Wilson | 9 – Fagbemi | 4 – Fagbemi | The Pavilion (1,521); Davis, CA |
| February 12, 2026; 7:00 pm, ESPN+ | | at UC San Diego | L 51–68 | 15–10 (8–6) | 13 – Wilson | 4 – Tied | 3 – Tied | LionTree Arena (1,874); La Jolla, CA |
| February 14, 2026; 2:00 pm, ESPN+ | | Long Beach State | W 71–54 | 16–10 (9–6) | 18 – Wilson | 10 – Rocak | 6 – Wilson | The Pavilion (1,317); Davis, CA |
| February 19, 2026; 7:00 pm, ESPN+ | | at Cal State Fullerton | L 92–93 | 16–11 (9–7) | 26 – Cooper | 6 – Tied | 6 – Tied | Titan Gym (535); Fullerton, CA |
| February 21, 2026; 5:00 pm, ESPN+ | | at UC Riverside | W 78–73 | 17–11 (10–7) | 22 – Sevilla | 7 – Stokes | 4 – Tied | SRC Arena (325); Riverside, CA |
| February 26, 2026; 6:00 pm, ESPN+ | | Hawai'i | L 73–77 | 17–12 (10–8) | 25 – Wilson | 8 – Suljanovic | 3 – Tied | The Pavilion (1,821); Davis, CA |
| March 5, 2026; 7:00 pm, ESPN+ | | at Long Beach State | W 76–70 ^{OT} | 18–12 (11–8) | 30 – Wilson | 13 – Rocak | 4 – Fagbemi | Walter Pyramid (1,419); Long Beach, CA |
| March 7, 2026; 5:00 pm, ESPNU | | at UC Irvine | L 69–79 ^{OT} | 18–13 (11–9) | 20 – Rocak | 5 – Tied | 8 – Wilson | Bren Events Center (2,963); Irvine, CA |
Big West tournament
| March 11, 2026; 8:30 pm, ESPN+ | (6) | vs. (7) UC Santa Barbara; First round | W 79–73 | 19–13 | 24 – Daughtery Jr. | 9 – Chappell | 4 – Wilson | Lee's Family Forum (1,035); Henderson, NV |
| March 12, 2026; 8:30 pm, ESPN+ | (6) | vs. (3) Cal State Fullerton; Quarterfinals | L 70–82 | 19–14 | 20 – Sevilla | 7 – Tied | 6 – Fagbemi | Lee's Family Forum (1,030); Henderson, NV |
*Non-conference game. ^{#}Rankings from AP Poll. (#) Tournament seedings in parentheses. All times are in Pacific.
