= 2026 Big West Conference men's basketball tournament =

American college basketball postseason tournament

- Classification: Division I
- Season: 2025–26
- Teams: 8
- Site: Lee's Family Forum; Henderson, Nevada
- Champions: Hawaii (2nd title)
- Winning coach: Eran Ganot (2nd title)
- MVP: Isaac Johnson (Hawaii)
- Television: ESPN+, ESPNU, ESPN2

2025–26 Big West Conference men's basketball standings
	Conf.				Overall
Team	W		L	PCT	W		L	PCT
UC Irvine	15	–	5	.750	23	–	12	.657
Hawai'i †	14	–	6	.700	24	–	9	.727
Cal State Fullerton	12	–	8	.600	18	–	16	.529
Cal State Northridge	12	–	8	.600	20	–	14	.588
UC San Diego	12	–	8	.600	23	–	11	.676
UC Davis	11	–	9	.550	19	–	14	.576
UC Santa Barbara	11	–	9	.550	18	–	14	.563
Cal Poly	10	–	10	.500	14	–	19	.424
Long Beach State	6	–	14	.300	10	–	22	.313
UC Riverside	5	–	15	.250	10	–	22	.313
Cal State Bakersfield	2	–	18	.100	8	–	24	.250
† 2026 Big West tournament winner

The 2026 Big West Conference men's basketball tournament was the postseason men's basketball tournament for the Big West Conference of the 2025–26 NCAA Division I men's basketball season. It was held March 11–14, 2026, at the Lee's Family Forum in Henderson, Nevada. The winner, Hawaii, received the conference's automatic bid to the 2026 NCAA tournament. This was the last year UC Davis and Hawaii competed in the Big West tournament, as they will move to the Mountain West following this year.

== Seeds ==
The top eight teams in the conference standings will qualify for the tournament. Teams are seeded by record within the conference, with a tiebreaker system to seed teams with identical conference records. The top two seeds will receive double byes to the semifinals, the third and fourth seeds will receive single byes to the quarterfinals, and the remaining four seeds will play each other in the first round.

Seed	School	Record	Tiebreaker #1	Tiebreaker #2
1	UC Irvine	15–5		
2	Hawai'i	14–6		
3	Cal State Fullerton	12–8	4–0 vs. CSU Northridge/UC San Diego	
4	Cal State Northridge	12–8	2–2 vs. CSU Fullerton/UC San Diego	2-0 vs. UC San Diego
5	UC San Diego	12–8	0–4 vs. CSU Fullerton/CSU Northridge	0-2 vs. CSU Northridge
6	UC Davis	11–9	2–0 vs. UC Santa Barbara	
7	UC Santa Barbara	11–9	0–2 vs. UC Davis	
8	Cal Poly	10–10		
DNQ	Long Beach State	6–14		
DNQ	UC Riverside	5–15		
DNQ	Cal State Bakersfield	2–18		

== Schedule and results ==
Game	Time	Matchup	Score	Television	Attendance
First round – Wednesday, March 11
1	6:00 pm	No. 5 UC San Diego vs. No 8. Cal Poly	72–69	ESPN+	1,035
2	8:30 pm	No. 6 UC Davis vs. No. 7 UC Santa Barbara	79–73	ESPN+	1,035
Quarterfinals – Thursday, March 12
3	6:00 pm	No. 4 Cal State Northridge vs. No. 5 UC San Diego	80–70	ESPN+	1,030
4	8:30 pm	No. 3 Cal State Fullerton vs. No. 6 UC Davis	82–70	ESPN+	1,030
Semifinals – Friday, March 13
5	6:00 pm	No. 1 UC Irvine vs. No. 4 Cal State Northridge	93–78	ESPNU	2,060
6	8:30 pm	No. 2 Hawai'i vs. No. 3 Cal State Fullerton	78–63	ESPN2	2,060
Final – Saturday, March 14
7	7:00 pm	No. 1 UC Irvine vs. No. 2 Hawai'i	64–71	ESPN2	3,488
*Game times in PDT. Rankings denote tournament seed.

== Bracket ==
First Round; Wednesday, March 11
5	UC San Diego	72
8	Cal Poly	69
6	UC Davis	79
7	UC Santa Barbara	73

Quarterfinals; Thursday, March 12
4	Cal State Northridge	80
5	UC San Diego	70
3	Cal State Fullerton	82
6	UC Davis	70

Semifinals; Friday, March 13
1	UC Irvine	93
4	Cal State Northridge	78
2	Hawai'i	78
3	Cal State Fullerton	63

Championship; Saturday, March 14
1	UC Irvine	64
2	Hawai'i	71

== Game summaries ==
=== First round ===
ESPN+

March 11
6:00 pm

Report

No. 5 UC San Diego 72, No. 8 Cal Poly 69
Scoring by half: 26–35, 46–34
Pts: Hudson Mayes (20); Rebs: Leo Beath (8); Asts: Tom Beattie (4)	Pts: Hamad Mousa (21); Rebs: Cayden Ward (9); Asts: Cayden Ward (4)

Lee's Family Forum
Henderson, Nevada
Referees: Jeff Campbell, Deldre Carr, Bill Vinovich

ESPN+

March 11
8:30 pm

Report

No. 6 UC Davis 79, No. 7 UC Santa Barbara 73
Scoring by half: 34–31, 45–42
Pts: Carl Daughtery Jr. (24); Rebs: Carl Daughtery Jr. (8); Asts: Marcus Wilson (4)	Pts: CJ Shaw (20); Rebs: Miro Little (7); Asts: Miro Little (3)

Lee's Family Forum
Henderson, Nevada
Attendance: 1,035
Referees: Deron White, Rick Crawford, Ervin Wilson

=== Quarterfinals ===
ESPN+

March 12
6:00 pm

Report

No. 4 Cal State Northridge 80, No. 5 UC San Diego 70
Scoring by half: 32–36, 48–34
Pts: Larry Hughes II (34); Rebs: Mahmoud Fofana (12); Asts: Josiah Davis (9)	Pts: Tom Beattie (22); Rebs: Tom Beattie (7); Asts: Tom Beattie (5)

Lee's Family Forum
Henderson, Nevada
Referees: Matthew Rukasin, Eric Curry, Deron White

ESPN+

March 12
8:30 pm

No. 3 Cal State Fullerton 82, No. 6 UC Davis 70
Scoring by half: 38–26, 44–34
Pts: Joshua Ward (24); Rebs: Jefferson De La Cruz Monegro (11); Asts: Joshua Ward (3)	Pts: Connor Sevilla (20); Rebs: Tied (7); Asts: Brayden Fagbemi (6)

Lee's Family Forum
Henderson, Nevada
Attendance: 1,030
Referees: Darron George, Antonio Petty, John Hampton

=== Semifinals ===
ESPNU

March 13
6:00 pm

No. 1 UC Irvine 93, No. 4 Cal State Northridge 78
Scoring by half: 49–37, 44–31
Pts: Derin Saran (23); Rebs: Derin Saran (9); Asts: Jurian Dixon (7)	Pts: Josiah Davis (26); Rebs: Tied (5); Asts: Josiah Davis (8)

Lee's Family Forum
Henderson, Nevada
Referees: Deldre Carr, Justin Shamion, Eric Curry

ESPN2

March 13
8:30 pm

No. 2 Hawai'i 78, No. 3 Cal State Fullerton 63
Scoring by half: 29–21, 49–42
Pts: Isaac Johnson (19); Rebs: Harry Rouhliadeff (10); Asts: Hunter Erickson (5)	Pts: Christian Williams (21); Rebs: Jefferson De La Cruz Monegro (5); Asts: Joshua Ward (5)

Lee's Family Forum
Henderson, Nevada
Attendance: 2,060
Referees: Deron White, Antinio Petty, Matthew Rukasin

=== Championship ===
ESPN2

March 14
7:00 pm

No. 1 UC Irvine 64, No. 2 Hawai'i 71
Scoring by half: 30–31, 34–40
Pts: Jurian Dixon (17); Rebs: Kyle Evans (10); Asts: Tied (3)	Pts: Isaac Johnson (22); Rebs: Harry Rouhliadeff (12); Asts: Hunter Erickson (8)

Lee's Family Forum
Henderson, Nevada
Attendance: 3,488
Referees: Tony Padilla, Randy McCall, Deron White

== Awards and Honors ==
=== All-Tournament Team ===
Player	Team
**Isaac Johnson**	Hawaii
Dre Bullock	Hawaii
Harry Rouhliadeff	Hawaii
Jurian Dixon	UC Irvine
Derin Saran	UC Irvine
Josiah Davis	Cal State Northridge

MVP in bold

== See also ==
- 2026 Big West Conference women's basketball tournament
