= 2025–26 Cal State Fullerton Titans men's basketball team =

American college basketball season

2025–26 Cal State Fullerton Titans men's basketball
- Conference: Big West Conference
- Record: 18–16 (12–8 Big West)
- Head coach: Dedrique Taylor (13th season)
- Assistant coaches: Ryan Hamm; Hassan Nizam; Jayson Wells
- Home arena: Titan Gym (Capacity: 4,000)

2025–26 Big West Conference men's basketball standings
| | Conf. | | | | Overall |
| Team | W | | L | PCT | W | | L | PCT |
|---|---|---|---|---|---|---|---|---|
| UC Irvine | 15 | – | 5 | .750 | 23 | – | 12 | .657 |
| Hawai'i † | 14 | – | 6 | .700 | 24 | – | 9 | .727 |
| Cal State Fullerton | 12 | – | 8 | .600 | 18 | – | 16 | .529 |
| Cal State Northridge | 12 | – | 8 | .600 | 20 | – | 14 | .588 |
| UC San Diego | 12 | – | 8 | .600 | 23 | – | 11 | .676 |
| UC Davis | 11 | – | 9 | .550 | 19 | – | 14 | .576 |
| UC Santa Barbara | 11 | – | 9 | .550 | 18 | – | 14 | .563 |
| Cal Poly | 10 | – | 10 | .500 | 14 | – | 19 | .424 |
| Long Beach State | 6 | – | 14 | .300 | 10 | – | 22 | .313 |
| UC Riverside | 5 | – | 15 | .250 | 10 | – | 22 | .313 |
| Cal State Bakersfield | 2 | – | 18 | .100 | 8 | – | 24 | .250 |
† 2026 Big West tournament winner

The 2025–26 Cal State Fullerton Titans men's basketball team represented California State University, Fullerton during the 2025–26 NCAA Division I men's basketball season. The Titans, led by 13th-year head coach Dedrique Taylor, played their home games at Titan Gym in Fullerton, California as members of the Big West Conference.

== Previous season ==
The Titans finished the 2024–25 season 6–26, 1–19 in Big West play to finish in a tie for seventh place. Due to tiebreakers, they failed to qualify for the Big West tournament.

== Preseason ==
On October 16, 2025, the Big West Conference released their preseason coaches' poll. Cal State Fullerton was picked to finish last in the conference.

=== Preseason rankings ===
Big West Preseason Poll
| Place | Team | Points |
|---|---|---|
| 1 | UC Irvine | 98 (8) |
| 2 | UC Santa Barbara | 93 (3) |
| 3 | Hawai'i | 76 |
| 4 | UC San Diego | 69 |
| 5 | Cal State Northridge | 63 |
| 6 | UC Davis | 58 |
| 7 | Cal Poly | 54 |
| 8 | Long Beach State | 31 |
| 9 | UC Riverside | 26 |
| 10 | Cal State Bakersfield | 20 |
| 11 | Cal State Fullerton | 17 |
(#) first-place votes

=== Preseason All-Big West Team ===
No players were named the Preseason All-Big West Team.

== Roster ==
2025–26 Cal State Fullerton Titans men's basketball team
Players
Coaches

| Pos. | # | Name | Height | Weight | Year | Previous school | Hometown |
|---|---|---|---|---|---|---|---|
| G | 1 | Davis White | 6 ft 5 in (1.96 m) | 210 lb (95 kg) | Jr | College of the Sequoias | Santa Clarita, California |
| G | 2 | KJ Garris | 6 ft 5 in (1.96 m) | 200 lb (91 kg) | Fr | Grayson High School | Atlanta, Georgia |
| G | 3 | Joshua Ward | 6 ft 1 in (1.85 m) | 185 lb (84 kg) | Sr | Palm Beach Atlantic | Memphis, Tennessee |
| G | 5 | Yesan Warren | 6 ft 1 in (1.85 m) | 185 lb (84 kg) | So | Frank Phillips College | Capitol Heights, Maryland |
| G | 7 | Christian Williams | 6 ft 0 in (1.83 m) | 185 lb (84 kg) | Fr | Vashon High School | St. Louis, Missouri |
| G | 8 | Bailey Nunn | 6 ft 0 in (1.83 m) | 175 lb (79 kg) | Jr | Sacramento State | Melbourne, Australia |
| G | 10 | Karan Kolappa | 6 ft 3 in (1.91 m) | 190 lb (86 kg) | Fr | The King's Academy | Santa Clara, California |
| G | 12 | Bryce Cofield | 6 ft 6 in (1.98 m) | 210 lb (95 kg) | Fr | Sierra Canyon School | Chatsworth, California |
| G | 13 | Jefferson De La Cruz Monegro | 6 ft 3 in (1.91 m) | 205 lb (93 kg) | Sr | Valparaiso | LaSalle, Quebec |
| G | 15 | Nicholas Khatchikian | 6 ft 2 in (1.88 m) | 170 lb (77 kg) | Fr | Armenian Mesrobian School | Pasadena, California |
| G | 21 | Kidus Tilahun | 6 ft 1 in (1.85 m) | 180 lb (82 kg) | So | Los Altos High School | Los Angeles, California |
| G | 22 | Matthew Quinlan | 6 ft 0 in (1.83 m) | 170 lb (77 kg) | Fr | Rancho Solano Prep | Phoenix, Arizona |
| F | 24 | Kendrick De Luna | 6 ft 10 in (2.08 m) | 230 lb (104 kg) | Jr | TMI Episcopal | San Antonio, Texas |
| G | 32 | Jaden Henderson | 6 ft 3 in (1.91 m) | 197 lb (89 kg) | GS | Concordia–Irvine | Sacramento, California |
| F | 33 | Ben Winker | 6 ft 10 in (2.08 m) | 230 lb (104 kg) | Fr | Chaminade College Prep | St. Louis, Missouri |
| F | 99 | Landon Seaman | 6 ft 8 in (2.03 m) | 220 lb (100 kg) | GS | Menlo | Vacaville, California |

Head coach

- Dedrique Taylor (UC Davis)

Assistant coach(es)

- Ryan Hamm (Thomas More)
- Hassan Nizam (Capella)
- Jayson Wells (Indiana State)

Legend

- (C) Team captain
- (S) Suspended
- (I) Ineligible
- (W) Walk-on
- Injured
- Current redshirt

Roster
Last update: October 28, 2025

== Schedule and results ==
| Date time, TV | Rank^{#} | Opponent^{#} | Result | Record | High points | High rebounds | High assists | Site (attendance) city, state |
Regular season
| November 3, 2025*; 7:00 pm, ESPN+ | | Caltech | W 136–82 | 1–0 | 25 – Henderson | 8 – Garris | 7 – Cofield | Titan Gym (831); Fullerton, CA |
| November 8, 2025*; 1:00 pm | | at Wyoming | L 82–92 | 1–1 | 21 – Tied | 9 – Ward | 2 – Tied | Arena-Auditorium (3,211); Laramie, WY |
| November 10, 2025*; 3:00 pm, ACCNX | | at California | L 65–93 | 1–2 | 20 – Seaman | 8 – Ward | 3 – Tied | Haas Pavilion (2,377); Berkeley, CA |
| November 15, 2025*; 2:00 pm, ESPN+ | | Pacific | L 73–85 | 1–3 | 18 – Cofield | 6 – Garris | 2 – Tied | Titan Gym (459); Fullerton, CA |
| November 21, 2025*; 7:00 pm, ESPN+ | | at Portland; Portland Invitational | L 85–103 | 1–4 | 17 – Ward | 5 – Ward | 8 – Henderson | Chiles Center (1,118); Portland, OR |
| November 22, 2025*; 2:30 pm, ESPN+ | | vs. St. Thomas; Portland Invitational | W 88–80 | 2–4 | 20 – Ward | 9 – Williams | 6 – Ward | Chiles Center (450); Portland, OR |
| November 23, 2025*; 11:00 am, ESPN+ | | vs. Northern Colorado; Portland Invitational | L 93–97 | 2–5 | 31 – Ward | 9 – Williams | 3 – Cofield | Chiles Center; Portland, OR |
| November 29, 2025*; 2:00 pm, ESPN+ | | Pepperdine | W 83–69 | 3–5 | 19 – Ward | 8 – Seaman | 5 – Henderson | Titan Gym (536); Fullerton, CA |
| December 4, 2025; 7:00 pm, ESPN+ | | Cal Poly | L 91–94 | 3–6 (0–1) | 21 – Henderson | 6 – Tied | 3 – Tied | Titan Gym (919); Fullerton, CA |
| December 6, 2025; 10:00 pm, ESPN+ | | at Hawai'i | L 59–69 | 3–7 (0–2) | 17 – Seaman | 7 – Ward | 1 – Tied | Stan Sheriff Center (4,374); Honolulu, HI |
| December 10, 2025*; 7:00 pm, ESPN+ | | Bethesda | W 116–66 | 4–7 | 25 – Seaman | 10 – White | 7 – De La Cruz Monegro | Titan Gym (454); Fullerton, CA |
| December 13, 2025*; 1:00 pm | | at Denver | W 105–86 | 5–7 | 20 – Ward | 6 – Tied | 6 – Ward | Hamilton Gymnasium (861); Denver, CO |
| December 21, 2025*; 2:00 pm, ESPN+ | | at Oklahoma State | L 89–94 | 5–8 | 20 – De La Cruz Monegro | 13 – Seaman | 6 – Ward | Gallagher-Iba Arena (5,727); Stillwater, OK |
| December 28, 2025*; 12:00 pm, ESPN+ | | at SMU | L 63–110 | 5–9 | 16 – Ward | 7 – Cofield | 7 – Ward | Moody Coliseum (4,584); University Park, TX |
| January 1, 2026; 7:00 pm, ESPN+ | | UC Santa Barbara | W 95–84 | 6–9 (1–2) | 25 – De La Cruz Monegro | 6 – De La Cruz Monegro | 5 – Ward | Titan Gym (493); Fullerton, CA |
| January 3, 2026; 4:00 pm, ESPN+ | | UC Irvine | L 64–86 | 6–10 (1–3) | 19 – Garris | 7 – De La Cruz Monegro | 4 – De La Cruz Monegro | Titan Gym (615); Fullerton, CA |
| January 8, 2026; 7:00 pm, ESPN+ | | at UC San Diego | W 88–71 | 7–10 (2–3) | 22 – Williams | 6 – Cofield | 6 – De La Cruz Monegro | LionTree Arena (2,137); La Jolla, CA |
| January 10, 2026; 4:00 pm, ESPN+ | | Cal State Northridge | W 86–79 | 8–10 (3–3) | 21 – Williams | 12 – Cofield | 4 – Tied | Titan Gym (486); Fullerton, CA |
| January 15, 2026; 6:00 pm, ESPN+ | | at UC Davis | L 69–74 | 8–11 (3–4) | 19 – Ward | 8 – Cofield | 5 – Williams | University Credit Union Center (1,133); Davis, CA |
| January 17, 2026; 5:00 pm, ESPN+ | | at UC Riverside | L 72–81 | 8–12 (3–5) | 17 – De La Cruz Monegro | 7 – Cofield | 4 – Seaman | SRC Arena (375); Riverside, CA |
| January 22, 2026; 7:00 pm, ESPN+ | | Long Beach State | W 71–61 | 9–12 (4–5) | 21 – Ward | 9 – Ward | 4 – Tied | Titan Gym (2,428); Fullerton, CA |
| January 24, 2026; 4:00 pm, ESPN+ | | at Cal Poly | W 93–78 | 10–12 (5–5) | 26 – Williams | 8 – Ward | 7 – Ward | Mott Athletics Center (2,318); San Luis Obispo, CA |
| January 31, 2026; 6:00 pm, ESPN+ | | at UC Santa Barbara | L 69–83 | 10–13 (5–6) | 18 – Garris | 5 – Tied | 3 – Ward | The Thunderdome (2,584); Santa Barbara, CA |
| February 5, 2026; 7:00 pm, ESPN+ | | UC Riverside | W 78–72 | 11–13 (6–6) | 18 – Ward | 10 – Nunn | 3 – Henderson | Titan Gym (483); Fullerton, CA |
| February 7, 2026; 4:00 pm, ESPN+ | | Cal State Bakersfield | W 82–66 | 12–13 (7–6) | 18 – Seaman | 6 – Tied | 6 – Ward | Titan Gym (403); Fullerton, CA |
| February 12, 2026; 7:00 pm, ESPN+ | | at Long Beach State | W 86–82 | 13–13 (8–6) | 22 – Ward | 7 – Cofield | 7 – Ward | Walter Pyramid (2,134); Long Beach, CA |
| February 14, 2026; 7:00 pm, ESPN+ | | at UC Irvine | L 65–86 | 13–14 (8–7) | 14 – Seaman | 6 – Cofield | 5 – Williams | Bren Events Center (1,991); Irvine, CA |
| February 19, 2026; 7:00 pm, ESPN+ | | UC Davis | W 93–92 | 14–14 (9–7) | 26 – Seaman | 7 – Seaman | 5 – Nunn | Titan Gym (535); Fullerton, CA |
| February 21, 2026; 6:30 pm, ESPN+ | | at Cal State Bakersfield | W 88–80 | 15–14 (10–7) | 21 – Ward | 6 – De La Cruz Monegro | 6 – Nunn | Icardo Center (482); Bakersfield, CA |
| February 28, 2026; 4:00 pm, ESPN+ | | Hawai'i | L 85–87 | 15–15 (10–8) | 16 – Ward | 5 – Garris Jr. | 8 – Ward | Titan Gym; Fullerton, CA |
| March 5, 2026; 7:00 pm, ESPN+ | | UC San Diego | W 75–71 | 16–15 (11–8) | 20 – Ward | 8 – De La Cruz Monegro | 5 – Tied | Titan Gym (848); Fullerton, CA |
| March 7, 2026; 5:00 pm, ESPN+ | | at Cal State Northridge | W 90–77 | 17–15 (12–8) | 23 – Williams | 6 – Williams | 5 – Williams | Premier America Credit Union Arena (1,394); Northridge, CA |
Big West tournament
| March 12, 2026; 8:30 pm, ESPN+ | (3) | vs. (6) UC Davis; Quarterfinals | W 82–70 | 18–15 | 24 – Ward | 11 – De La Cruz Monegro | 3 – Ward | Lee's Family Forum (1,030); Henderson, NV |
| March 13, 2026; 8:30 pm, ESPN2 | (3) | vs. (2) Hawaii; Semifinals | L 63–78 | 18–16 | 21 – Williams | 5 – De La Cruz Monegro | 5 – Ward | Lee's Family Forum (2,060); Henderson, NV |
*Non-conference game. ^{#}Rankings from AP Poll. (#) Tournament seedings in parentheses. All times are in Pacific.

== Game summaries ==
This section will be filled in as the season progresses.
