= 2026–27 Liberty Flames basketball team =

American college basketball season

2026–27 Liberty Flames basketball
- Conference: Conference USA
- Record: 4–1 (0–0 CUSA)
- Head coach: Ritchie McKay (12th, 14th overall season)
- Associate head coach: Derek Johnston
- Assistant coaches: Stephen Burggraf; Kyle Rode; Zach Farquhar; Chris Rogers
- Home arena: Liberty Arena

2026–27 Conference USA men's basketball standings
	Conf.				Overall
Team	W		L	PCT	W		L	PCT
Missouri State	0	–	0	–	5	–	0	1.000
Kennesaw State	0	–	0	–	5	–	1	.833
Liberty	0	–	0	–	4	–	1	.800
FIU	0	–	0	–	3	–	1	.750
Middle Tennessee	0	–	0	–	5	–	2	.714
Delaware	0	–	0	–	4	–	2	.667
Western Kentucky	0	–	0	–	4	–	2	.667
Jacksonville State	0	–	0	–	3	–	3	.500
Sam Houston	0	–	0	–	3	–	3	.500
New Mexico State	0	–	0	–	1	–	4	.200
† 2027 CUSA tournament winner As of November 22, 2026; Rankings from AP poll

The 2026–27 Liberty Flames basketball team represents Liberty University for the 2026–27 NCAA Division I men's basketball season. The Flames are led by Ritchie McKay in the twelfth season of his current stint as head coach (14th overall). The Flames play their home games at Liberty Arena in Lynchburg, Virginia as members of Conference USA.

== Previous season ==
The Flames finished the 2025–26 season 26–8 overall and 17–3 in C-USA play to finish in first place. As the No. 1 seed in the C-USA tournament, the Flames were upset by the No. 9 seed Missouri State Bears in the quarterfinals, losing 69–77. As a result of their KNIT score, the Flames received an automatic bid to the 2026 National Invitation Tournament. Unseeded in the Auburn Region, the Flames opened on the road against the No. 3 seed George Mason and won 77–71. In the second round, the Flames traveled to face No. 2 seed Nevada and fell 63–73.

== Offseason ==
=== Departures ===
Liberty departures
Name	Num	Pos.	Height	weight	Year	Hometown	Reason for departure
Colin Porter	0	Guard	5'9"	170	Senior	Ashland, KY	Transferred to Marquette
Kaden Metheny	3	Guard	5'10"	170	Graduate student	Morgantown, WV	Graduated
Brett Decker Jr.	4	Guard	6'4"	190	Sophomore	Cecilia, KY	Transferred to Baylor
Isaiah Ihnen	7	Forward	6'9"	220	(redshirt) Junior	Böblingen, Germany	Graduated
JJ Harper	9	Guard	6'5"	220	(redshirt) Senior	Orlando, FL	Graduated
JC Shrirer	10	Guard	6'3"	195	(redshirt) Sophomore	Arlington, TX	Graduated
Zander Yates	11	Forward	6'8"	225	(redshirt) Junior	Germantown, TN	Graduated
Josh Smith	12	Forward	6'9"	225	Senior	Monrovia, IN	Graduated
Zach Cleveland	25	Forward	6'7"	220	Junior	Bloomington, IL	Graduated; signed with Memphis Grizzlies as a UDFA

=== Incoming transfers ===
Liberty incoming transfers
Name	Num	Pos.	Height	weight	Year	Hometown	Previous school
Cooper Campbell	3	Guard	6'1"	195	Junior	Puyallup, WA	Troy
Dillon Claussen	4	Forward	6'8"	215	Junior	Omaha, NE	Washburn (Division II)
Sean Register Jr.	8	Forward	6'7"	N/A	Sophomore	Cleveland, OH	Eastern Florida State (NJCAA)
Cobi Campbell	10	Guard	6'2"	195	5th year	Puyallup, WA	Troy
Osmar Garcia-Araujo	28	Forward	6'7"	N/A	Senior	Caracas, Venezuela	Anderson (SC) (Division II)
Matthew Shelton	32	Guard	6'5"	N/A	Junior	Hillsboro, VA	Charleston (WV) (Division II)

=== 2026 recruiting class ===
College recruiting
Name	Hometown	School	Height	Weight	Commit date
Eli Sancomb; Guard	Wheeling, WV	Wheeling Central Catholic High School	6 ft 5 in (1.96 m)	190 lb (86 kg)	September 9, 2025
Eli Sancomb; Guard	Recruit ratings: 247Sports: On3: ESPN: (81)				
Reece Davidson; Forward	London, KY	North Laurel	6 ft 7 in (2.01 m)	220 lb (100 kg)	July 24, 2025
Reece Davidson; Forward	Recruit ratings: 247Sports: On3:				
Eli Herbert; Guard	Grain Valley, MO	Grain Valley High School	6 ft 1 in (1.85 m)	150 lb (68 kg)	September 4, 2024
Eli Herbert; Guard	Recruit ratings: 247Sports: On3:				
Overall recruit ranking:
Note: In many cases, Scout, Rivals, 247Sports, On3, and ESPN may conflict in their listings of height and weight.; In these cases, the average was taken. ESPN grades are on a 100-point scale.; Sources: "2026 Player Commits". ESPN. Archived from the original on August 26, 2026.

== Preseason ==
On October 8, 2026 Conference USA released their preseason rankings and awards.

=== Preseason rankings ===
Conference USA Preseason Poll
Place	Team	Votes
1	Western Kentucky	94 (5)
2	Kennesaw State	90 (3)
3	Liberty	79 (2)
4	Sam Houston	64
5	Middle Tennessee	57
6	New Mexico State	56
7	Jacksonville State	36
8	Missouri State	28
9	Florida International	25
10	Delaware	21
(#) first-place votes

== Roster ==
Years are listed according to new NCAA 5-in-5 eligibility regulations.

2024–25 Liberty Flames men's basketball team
Players
Coaches

Pos.	#	Name	Height	Weight	Year	Previous school	Hometown
G	1	Zander Carter	6 ft 6 in (1.98 m)	195 lb (88 kg)	So	Paul G. Blazer High School	Greenup, KY
G	2	Eli Herbert	6 ft 1 in (1.85 m)	150 lb (68 kg)	Fr	Grain Valley High School	Grain Valley, MO
G	3	Cooper Campbell	6 ft 1 in (1.85 m)	195 lb (88 kg)	Jr	Phoenix Prep; Troy	Puyallup, WA
F	4	Dillon Claussen (injured)	6 ft 8 in (2.03 m)	215 lb (98 kg)	RS Jr	Creighton Preparatory School; Washburn	Omaha, NE
F	8	Sean Register Jr. (injured)	6 ft 7 in (2.01 m)	—	So	Eastlake North High School; Eastern Florida State	Cleveland, OH
G	10	Cobi Campbell	6 ft 2 in (1.88 m)	195 lb (88 kg)	GS	Puyallup High School; Troy	Puyallup, WA
G	11	Eli Sancomb	6 ft 5 in (1.96 m)	190 lb (86 kg)	Fr	Wheeling Central Catholic High School	Wheeling, WV
F	15	Drew Grimes	6 ft 9 in (2.06 m)	205 lb (93 kg)	So	Clayton High School	Goldsboro, NC
F	20	Torr Sorensen	6 ft 7 in (2.01 m)	220 lb (100 kg)	So	Western Reserve Academy	Goode, VA
F	21	Ryan Jones Jr.	6 ft 8 in (2.03 m)	240 lb (109 kg)	Jr	The Rock School; Virginia Tech	Gainesville, FL
F	23	TJ Drain	6 ft 8 in (2.03 m)	220 lb (100 kg)	So	Windermere High School	Windermere, FL
F	24	Brady Kester (W)	6 ft 8 in (2.03 m)	220 lb (100 kg)	Jr	Davidson Day School	Huntersville, NC
F	28	Osmar Garcia-Araujo	6 ft 7 in (2.01 m)	—	Sr	Sugar Hill High School; Anderson (SC)	Caracas, Venezuela
F	30	Reece Davidson	6 ft 8 in (2.03 m)	220 lb (100 kg)	Fr	North Laurel	London, KY
G	32	Matthew Shelton	6 ft 5 in (1.96 m)	—	Jr	Evergreen Christian School; Charleston (WV)	Hillsboro, VA

Head coach

- Ritchie McKay (Seattle Pacific)

Assistant coach(es)

- Derek Johnston (Associate HC) (Alabama–Huntsville)
- Stephen Burggraf (Liberty)
- Kyle Rode (Liberty)
- Zach Farquhar (Liberty)
- Chris Rogers (Trevecca Nazarene)

Legend

- (C) Team captain
- (S) Suspended
- (I) Ineligible
- (W) Walk-on
- Injured
- Current redshirt

Roster

== Schedule and results ==
Date time, TV	Rank^{#}	Opponent^{#}	Result	Record	High points	High rebounds	High assists	Site (attendance) city, state
Non-conference regular season
November 2, 2026*; 12:00 a.m., YouTube		vs. High Point; Field of 68 Showcase	L 57–72	0–1	21 – Carter	6 – Tied	4 – Sancomb	Rock Hill Sports and Events Center; Rock Hill, SC
November 7, 2026*; 2:00 p.m., ESPN+		Boyce (D-II)	W 113–54	1–1	21 – Coo. Campbell	9 – Sancomb	6 – Tied	Liberty Arena (3,832); Lynchburg, VA
November 13, 2026*; 7:30 p.m., ESPN+		NC Central	W 74–66	2–1	20 – Sancomb	10 – Sancomb	4 – Tied	Liberty Arena (3,668); Lynchburg, VA
November 17, 2026*; 6:00 p.m., ESPN+		vs. Southern Illinois	W 87–78	3–1	29 – Sancomb	13 – Sancomb	6 – Coo. Campbell	Curry Arena (168); Charlotte, NC
November 20, 2026*; 4:30 p.m., CBS Sports Network		vs. Rhode Island; Greenbrier Tip-Off	W 71–68	4–1	15 – Carter	7 – Herbert	7 – Coo. Campbell	The Greenbrier; White Sulphur Springs, WV
November 22, 2026*; 4:30 p.m., CBS Sports Network		vs. Richmond; Greenbrier Tip-Off						The Greenbrier; White Sulphur Springs, WV
November 25, 2026*; 4:00 p.m.		vs. Princeton; Live Oak Bank Holiday Classic						Trask Coliseum; Wilmington, NC
November 27, 2026*; 12:00 p.m.		vs. St. Thomas; Live Oak Bank Holiday Classic						Trask Coliseum; Wilmington, NC
November 28, 2026*; 3:00 p.m., FloSports		at UNC Wilmington; Live Oak Bank Holiday Classic						Trask Coliseum; Wilmington, NC
December 5, 2026*; 1:00 p.m., ESPN+		Christendom (USCAA)						Liberty Arena; Lynchburg, VA
December 11, 2026*; 7:00 p.m., ESPN+		Kentucky Christian (NCCAA)						Liberty Arena; Lynchburg, VA
December 17, 2026*; 7:00 p.m., ESPN+		Coppin State						Liberty Arena; Lynchburg, VA
December 19, 2026*; 6:00 p.m., ESPN+		Dayton						Liberty Arena; Lynchburg, VA
December 22, 2026*; 4:00 p.m., ESPN+		Maryland Eastern Shore						Liberty Arena; Lynchburg, VA
C-USA regular season
January 2, 2027; 6:00 p.m., ESPNU		Delaware						Liberty Arena; Lynchburg, VA
January 7, 2027; 9:00 p.m., ESPN2		at FIU						Ocean Bank Convocation Center; Westchester, FL
January 9, 2027; 3:00 p.m., ESPN+		at Missouri State						Great Southern Bank Arena; Springfield, MO
January 14, 2027; 8:30 p.m., CBS Sports Network		Middle Tennessee						Liberty Arena; Lynchburg, VA
January 16, 2027; 12:00 p.m., CBS Sports Network		Western Kentucky						Liberty Arena; Lynchburg, VA
January 21, 2027; 7:00 p.m., ESPN+		at Jacksonville State						Pete Mathews Coliseum; Jacksonville, AL
January 23, 2027; 6:00 p.m., CBS Sports Network		at Kennesaw State						VyStar Arena; Kennesaw, GA
January 28, 2027; 8:30 p.m., CBS Sports Network		Sam Houston						Liberty Arena; Lynchburg, VA
January 30, 2027; 4:00 p.m., ESPN+		New Mexico State						Liberty Arena; Lynchburg, VA
February 4, 2027; 7:00 p.m., ESPN+		Missouri State						Liberty Arena; Lynchburg, VA
February 6, 2027; 6:00 p.m., ESPN+		FIU						Liberty Arena; Lynchburg, VA
February 11, 2027; 9:00 p.m., CBS Sports Network		at Western Kentucky						E. A. Diddle Arena; Bowling Green, KY
February 13, 2027; 4:00 p.m., CBS Sports Network		at Middle Tennessee						Murphy Center; Murfreesboro, TN
February 18, 2027; 8:30 p.m., CBS Sports Network		Kennesaw State						Liberty Arena; Lynchburg, VA
February 20, 2027; 6:00 p.m., ESPN+		Jacksonville State						Liberty Arena; Lynchburg, VA
February 25, 2027; 8:30 p.m., ESPN+		at New Mexico State						Pan American Center; Las Cruces, NM
February 27, 2027; 4:00 p.m., CBS Sports Network		at Sam Houston						Bernard Johnson Coliseum; Huntsville, TX
March 6, 2027; 2:00 p.m., ESPN+		at Delaware						Bob Carpenter Center; Newark, DE
*Non-conference game. ^{#}Rankings from AP Poll. (#) Tournament seedings in parentheses. All times are in Eastern Time.
