= 2026–27 Sam Houston Bearkats men's basketball team =

American college basketball season

2026–27 Sam Houston Bearkats men's basketball
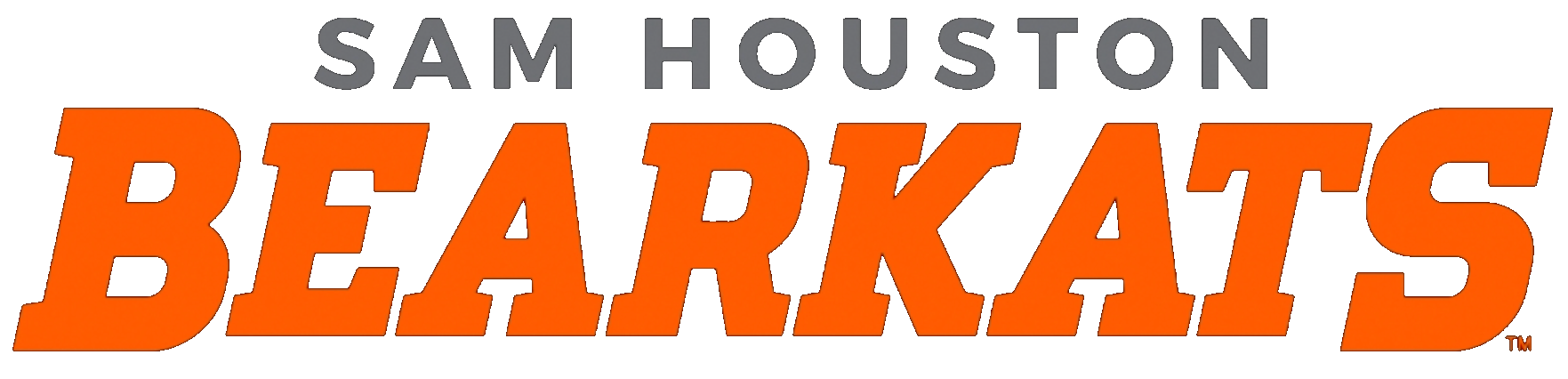
- Conference: Conference USA
- Record: 2–2 (0–0 CUSA)
- Head coach: Chris Mudge (4th season)
- Assistant coaches: Angres Thorpe (2nd season); Jake White (4th season); Joe Kuligoski (2nd season); Luke Pluymen (2nd season)
- Home arena: Bernard Johnson Coliseum

2026–27 Conference USA men's basketball standings
	Conf.				Overall
Team	W		L	PCT	W		L	PCT
Kennesaw State	0	–	0	–	4	–	0	1.000
FIU	0	–	0	–	3	–	0	1.000
Missouri State	0	–	0	–	3	–	0	1.000
Middle Tennessee	0	–	0	–	3	–	1	.750
Western Kentucky	0	–	0	–	3	–	1	.750
Liberty	0	–	0	–	2	–	1	.667
Sam Houston	0	–	0	–	2	–	2	.500
Delaware	0	–	0	–	1	–	2	.333
Jacksonville State	0	–	0	–	1	–	2	.333
New Mexico State	0	–	0	–	1	–	2	.333
† 2027 CUSA tournament winner As of November 14, 2026; Rankings from AP poll

The 2026–27 Sam Houston Bearkats men's basketball team will represent Sam Houston State University during the 2026–27 NCAA Division I men's basketball season. The Bearkats, led by third-year head coach Chris Mudge, played their home games at the Bernard Johnson Coliseum in Huntsville, Texas as third-year members of the Conference USA.

== Previous season ==
The Bearkats finished the 2025–26 season 22–12, 13–7 in CUSA play, to finish in ninth place. They defeated New Mexico State in the first round of the CUSA tournament,and then lost to Kennesaw State in the second round.

== Preseason ==
On October 8, 2026, Conference USA released their preseason poll. Sam Houston was picked to finish fourth in the conference.

=== Preseason rankings ===
CUSA Preseason Poll
Place	Team	Votes
1	Western Kentucky	94 (5)
2	Kennesaw State	90 (3)
3	Liberty	79 (2)
4	Sam Houston	64
5	Middle Tennessee	57
6	New Mexico State	56
7	Jacksonville State	36
8	Missouri State	28
9	FIU	25
10	Delaware	21
(#) first-place votes

=== Preseason All-CUSA Team ===
Preseason All-CUSA Honorees
Player	Year	Position
Justin Begg	Junior	Guard
Jacobe Coleman	Sophomore	Guard

== Roster ==
2026–27 Sam Houston Bearkats men's basketball team
Players
Coaches

Pos.	#	Name	Height	Weight	Year	Previous school	Hometown
G/F	0	Yoda Oke	6 ft 7 in (2.01 m)	—	Jr	Fullerton Community College	Fullerton, California
G	2	Jacobe Coleman	6 ft 3 in (1.91 m)	200 lb (91 kg)	So	Dynamic Prep	Fort Smith, Arkansas
G	4	Keller Partain	6 ft 6 in (1.98 m)	—	So	Bethel College	Lubbock, Texas
G	5	Justin Begg	6 ft 0 in (1.83 m)	185 lb (84 kg)	Jr	George Mason	Houston, Texas
F	6	Xavier Roberson	6 ft 6 in (1.98 m)	—	Fr	Dynamic Prep	Saginaw, Michigan
F	7	Zion Pipkin	6 ft 1 in (1.85 m)	—	Jr	South Plains College	Houston, Texas
G	8	Rylan Kelly	6 ft 3 in (1.91 m)	—	Fr	Klein Oak High School	Spring, Texas
F	10	Enel St. Bernard	6 ft 6 in (1.98 m)	—	Sr	Indiana State	Harford Village, Grenada
G	11	Aidan McDowell	6 ft 4 in (1.93 m)	195 lb (88 kg)	Jr	Western Colorado	Crete, Nebraska
F	12	Matt Dann	7 ft 1 in (2.16 m)	245 lb (111 kg)	So	Fort Erie International Academy	Oakville, Ontario
G	13	Nathan Nguyen	6 ft 0 in (1.83 m)	160 lb (73 kg)	So	St. Thomas Episcopal	Houston, Texas
F	18	Riccardo Greppi	6 ft 10 in (2.08 m)	255 lb (116 kg)	Jr	Wisconsin	Lecco, Italy
G	22	Mahliq Guiseppi-Kitson	6 ft 6 in (1.98 m)	—	Fr	United Scholastic Academy	Scarborough, Ontario
F	25	Alec Loustau	6 ft 8 in (2.03 m)	—	Jr	Golden State Prep	Oakland, California
F	32	Cheikh Sadibou Ndiaye	6 ft 10 in (2.08 m)	215 lb (98 kg)	Jr	Prestige Sports Academy	Louga, Senegal

Head coach

- Chris Mudge (Texas)

Assistant coach(es)

- Angres Thorpe (Saint Leo)
- Jake White (UT Tyler)
- Joe Kuligoski (Eastern Illinois)
- Luke Pluymen (Sul Ross State)

Legend

- (C) Team captain
- (S) Suspended
- (I) Ineligible
- (W) Walk-on
- Injured
- Current redshirt

Roster
Last update: October 19, 2026

== Schedule and results ==
Date time, TV	Rank^{#}	Opponent^{#}	Result	Record	High points	High rebounds	High assists	Site (attendance) city, state
Non-Conference Regular Season
November 3, 2026*; 6:30 p.m., SECN+		at No. 20 Alabama	L 74–96	0–1	16 – Coleman	8 – St. Bernard	6 – Pipkin	Coleman Coliseum (11,612); Tuscaloosa, AL
November 7, 2026*; 2:30 pm, ESPN+		Howard Payne	W 102–59	1–1	18 – McDowell	12 – Dann	8 – Begg	Bernard Johnson Coliseum (833); Huntsville, TX
November 11, 2026*; 6:30 pm, ESPN+		Pepperdine	W 85–77	2–1	20 – Tied	10 – St. Bernard	2 – Tied	Bernard Johnson Coliseum (1,100); Huntsville, TX
November 13, 2026*; 6:00 pm, B1G+		at No. 3 Illinois	L 86–108	2–2	19 – Tied	8 – St. Bernard	10 – Begg	State Farm Center (15,544); Champaign, IL
November 17, 2026*; 7:30 pm, MW+		at Wyoming						Arena-Auditorium; Laramie, WY
November 20, 2026*; 8:00 p.m., YouTube		at Boise State						ExtraMile Arena; Boise, ID
November 24, 2026*; 8:00 pm		at Washington State						Beasley Coliseum; Pullman, WA
November 28, 2026*; 2:30 pm		Paul Quinn						Bernard Johnson Coliseum; Huntsville, TX
December 4, 2026*; 7:00 pm		at Rice						Tudor Fieldhouse; Houston, TX
December 9, 2026*; 3:00 p.m.		Denver						Bernard Johnson Coliseum; Huntsville, TX
December 12, 2026*; 9:00 p.m.		at Nevada						Lawlor Events Center; Reno, NV
December 15, 2026*; 7:45 p.m.		at Omaha						Baxter Arena; Omaha, NE
December 19, 2026*; 6:00 p.m.		at Utah						Jon M. Huntsman Center; Salt Lake City, UT
December 27, 2026*; 2:30 p.m.		Our Lady of the Lake						Bernard Johnson Coliseum; Huntsville, TX
Conference USA Regular Season
December 31, 2026; 2:30 p.m.		Missouri State						Bernard Johnson Coliseum; Huntsville, TX
January 2, 2027; 2:30 p.m.		FIU						Bernard Johnson Coliseum; Huntsville, TX
January 7, 2027; 6:30 p.m.		at Middle Tennessee						Murphy Center; Murfreesboro, TN
January 9, 2027; 3:00 pm		at Western Kentucky						E. A. Diddle Arena; Bowling Green, KY
January 14, 2027; 6:30 pm		Kennesaw State						Bernard Johnson Coliseum; Huntsville, TX
January 16, 2027; 2:30 pm		Jacksonville State						Bernard Johnson Coliseum; Huntsville, TX
January 23, 2027; 2:00 pm		at New Mexico State						Pan American Center; Las Cruces, NM
January 28, 2027; 7:30 p.m.		at Liberty						Liberty Arena; Lynchburg, VA
January 30, 2027; 1:00 p.m.		at Delaware						Bob Carpenter Center; Newark, DE
February 4, 2027; 7:00 p.m.		Western Kentucky						Bernard Johnson Coliseum; Huntsville, TX
February 6, 2027; 2:30 pm		Middle Tennessee						Bernard Johnson Coliseum; Huntsville, TX
February 11, 2027; 6:00 pm		at Jacksonville State						Pete Mathews Coliseum; Jacksonville, AL
February 13, 2027; 1:00 p.m.		at Kennesaw State						VyStar Arena; Kennesaw, GA
February 20, 2027; 1:00 p.m.		New Mexico State						Bernard Johnson Coliseum; Huntsville, TX
February 25, 2027; 6:30 p.m.		Delaware						Bernard Johnson Coliseum; Huntsville, TX
February 27, 2026; 3:00 p.m.		Liberty						Bernard Johnson Coliseum; Huntsville, TX
March 4, 2027; 1:00 pm		at FIU						Ocean Bank Convocation Center; Miami, FL
March 6, 2027; 7:00 pm		at Missouri State						Great Southern Bank Arena; Springfield, MO
Conference USA tournament
TBA; TBA		vs.						Propst Arena; Huntsville, AL
*Non-conference game. ^{#}Rankings from AP poll. (#) Tournament seedings in parentheses. All times are in Central.
