= 2026–27 Air Force Falcons men's basketball team =

American college basketball season

2026–27 Air Force Falcons men's basketball
- Conference: Mountain West Conference
- Record: 3–2 (0–0 MW)
- Head coach: Joe Crispin (1st season)
- Associate head coach: Carson Cunningham (1st season)
- Assistant coaches: Eric Brennan (1st season); Michael Lyons (1st season); Capt. Sid Tomes (2nd season); Tanner Massey (1st season); Chris McCarron (1st season)
- Home arena: Clune Arena (Capacity: 5,508)

2026–27 Mountain West Conference men's basketball standings
	Conf.				Overall
Team	W		L	PCT	W		L	PCT
Grand Canyon	0	–	0	–	4	–	0	1.000
Wyoming	0	–	0	–	4	–	1	.800
New Mexico	0	–	0	–	3	–	1	.750
UTEP	0	–	0	–	3	–	1	.750
Air Force	0	–	0	–	3	–	2	.600
Hawaii	0	–	0	–	3	–	2	.600
Nevada	0	–	0	–	3	–	2	.600
San Jose State	0	–	0	–	3	–	2	.600
UC Davis	0	–	0	–	3	–	2	.600
UNLV	0	–	0	–	3	–	2	.600
† 2027 Mountain West tournament winner As of November 19, 2026; Rankings from AP poll

The 2026–27 Air Force Falcons men's basketball team represents the United States Air Force Academy during the 2026–27 NCAA Division I men's basketball season. The Falcons, led by first-year head coach Joe Crispin, play home games at Clune Arena in El Paso County, Colorado, north of Colorado Springs, as a member of the Mountain West Conference.

== Previous season ==
Air Force finished the 2025-26 season 3–29, 0–20 in the Mountain West Conference to finish twelfth in the conference. As the 12-seed in the Mountain West Tournament the Falcons were defeated by 12-seed Nevada 45-80 to end their season. On January 17, the Falcons announced that head coach Joe Scott was suspended indefinitely pending an investigation into his treatment of players, and assistant coach Jon Jordan was named interim head coach. On February 20, the school announced that Scott had mutually parted ways with the program. A week after the conclusion of the season, on March 18 the Falcons hired Penn State assistant coach Joe Crispin as the program's new head coach.

== Offseason ==
=== Departures ===
Air Force Falcons departures
Name	Number	Pos.	Height	Weight	Year	Hometown	Reason for departure
Chris Catchings	25	G	6'4"	218	Freshman	Houston, TX	Departed program
Sam Imade	33	F	6'7"	190	Freshman	Cincinnati, OH	Departed program
Kyle Marshall	35	G	6'4"	181	Sophomore	Oyster Bay, NY	Transferred to Bucknell

=== Incoming transfers ===
Air Force Falcons incoming transfers
Name	Number	Pos.	Height	Weight	Year	Hometown	Previous School
-	-	-	-	-	-	-	-

=== 2026 recruiting class ===
College recruiting
Name	Hometown	School	Height	Weight	Commit date
Grant Best; G	St. John, IN	USAFA Prep	6 ft 4 in (1.93 m)	195 lb (88 kg)	Oct 15, 2024
Grant Best; G	Recruit ratings: (NR)				
Mark Caslaru; F/C	Fort Mill, SC	Catawba Ridge HS	6 ft 10 in (2.08 m)	240 lb (110 kg)	Aug 24, 2025
Mark Caslaru; F/C	Recruit ratings: (NR)				
Caleb Fay; F	Denver, CO	Kent Denver School	6 ft 6 in (1.98 m)	210 lb (95 kg)	Oct 1, 2025
Caleb Fay; F	Recruit ratings: (NR)				
Diggy Griffin; G	Portland, OR	USAFA Prep	6 ft 5 in (1.96 m)	195 lb (88 kg)	Mar 31, 2025
Diggy Griffin; G	Recruit ratings: (NR)				
Tre Keene; G	San Antonio, TX	USAFA Prep	6 ft 1 in (1.85 m)	170 lb (77 kg)	-
Tre Keene; G	Recruit ratings: (NR)				
Mayson Thomas; F	San Antonio, TX	USAFA Prep	6 ft 5 in (1.96 m)	215 lb (98 kg)	Sep 8, 2025
Mayson Thomas; F	Recruit ratings: (NR)				
Overall recruit ranking: Scout: – Rivals: –
Note: In many cases, Scout, Rivals, 247Sports, On3, and ESPN may conflict in their listings of height and weight.; In these cases, the average was taken. ESPN grades are on a 100-point scale.; Sources: "2026 Air Force Basketball Recruiting Commits". Scout.; "Scout.com Team Recruiting Rankings". Scout.; "2026 Team Ranking". Rivals.

== Roster ==
2026–27 Air Force Falcons men's basketball team
Players
Coaches

Pos.	#	Name	Height	Weight	Year	Previous school	Hometown
F	0	Josh Gatete	6 ft 9 in (2.06 m)	205 lb (93 kg)	Sr	Penn HS	Granger, Indiana
F	1	Mayson Thomas	6 ft 5 in (1.96 m)	215 lb (98 kg)	Fr	Pieper HS	San Antonio, Texas
G	2	A.J. Patterson	6 ft 3 in (1.91 m)	200 lb (91 kg)	Jr	USAFA Prep	Atlanta, Georgia
G	3	Kam Sanders	6 ft 3 in (1.91 m)	195 lb (88 kg)	So	Lee County HS	Albany, Georgia
F/C	4	Mark Caslaru	6 ft 10 in (2.08 m)	240 lb (109 kg)	Fr	Catawba Ridge HS	Fort Mill, South Carolina
F	5	Riley Dering	6 ft 9 in (2.06 m)	230 lb (104 kg)	So	Highland Park HS	Dallas, Texas
G	6	Tre Keene	6 ft 1 in (1.85 m)	170 lb (77 kg)	Fr	USAFA Prep	San Antonio, Texas
G	7	Elliott Taite	6 ft 4 in (1.93 m)	200 lb (91 kg)	Jr	USAFA Prep	Frisco, Texas
F	8	Keaton Frisch	6 ft 6 in (1.98 m)	200 lb (91 kg)	So	USAFA Prep	Waunakee, Wisconsin
F	10	Caleb Walker	6 ft 9 in (2.06 m)	255 lb (116 kg)	Sr	USAFA Prep	Jefferson City, Missouri
F	11	Brendan Martin	6 ft 6 in (1.98 m)	210 lb (95 kg)	So	USAFA Prep	Huntsville, Alabama
F	13	Caleb Fay	6 ft 6 in (1.98 m)	210 lb (95 kg)	Fr	Kent Denver School	Denver, Colorado
G	15	Justin Hinds	6 ft 5 in (1.96 m)	200 lb (91 kg)	So	USAFA Prep	Wilmington, Delaware
G	17	Diggy Griffin	6 ft 5 in (1.96 m)	195 lb (88 kg)	Fr	USAFA Prep	Portland, Oregon
G	21	Ethan Greenberg	6 ft 4 in (1.93 m)	195 lb (88 kg)	So	Centerville HS	Centerville, Ohio
F	24	Lucas Hobin	6 ft 8 in (2.03 m)	208 lb (94 kg)	So	Strake Jesuit Prep	Katy, Texas
F	30	Eli Robinson	6 ft 6 in (1.98 m)	215 lb (98 kg)	Jr	USAFA Prep	Monument, Colorado
F	32	Kolby Gilles	6 ft 5 in (1.96 m)	250 lb (113 kg)	Sr	USAFA Prep	Chicago, Illinois
G	33	Grant Best	6 ft 4 in (1.93 m)	195 lb (88 kg)	Fr	USAFA Prep	St. John, Indiana
C	51	Wesley Celichowski	7 ft 0 in (2.13 m)	265 lb (120 kg)	Sr	USAFA Prep	Georgetown, Indiana

Head coach

- Joe Crispin (Penn State)

Assistant coach(es)

- Carson Cunningham (Purdue)
- Eric Brennan (Kutztown)
- Michael Lyons (Air Force)
- Capt. Sid Tomes (Air Force)
- Tanner Massey (Coastal Carolina)
- Jon Jordan (Air Force)
- Chris McCarron (Rowan)

Legend

- (C) Team captain
- (S) Suspended
- (I) Ineligible
- (W) Walk-on
- Injured
- Current redshirt

Roster

== Schedule and results ==
Date time, TV	Rank^{#}	Opponent^{#}	Result	Record	High points	High rebounds	High assists	Site (attendance) city, state
Non-conference regular season
November 2, 2026*; 5:00 p.m., ESPN+		at Wright State	L 71–102	0–1	17 – Tied	8 – Walker	3 – Best	Nutter Center (10,500); Fairborn, OH
November 5, 2026*; 6:30 p.m., MW+		Calumet	W 107–58	1–1	21 – Sanders	6 – Sanders	3 – Tied	Clune Arena (1,084); USAF Academy, CO
November 8, 2026*; 1:00 p.m., MW+		Idaho State	W 89–82	2–1	25 – Best	11 – Walker	3 – Tied	Clune Arena (1,125); USAF Academy, CO
November 11, 2026*; 1:00 p.m., MW+		Loyola Chicago	W 107–93	3–1	26 – Hobin	7 – Tied	12 – Sanders	Clune Arena (955); USAF Academy, CO
November 15, 2026 (Note: Postponed from November 14 due to nationwide ground stop.)*; 2:00 p.m., ESPN+		at Pacific	L 69–93	3–2	16 – Sanders	8 – Walker	6 – Sanders	Alex G. Spanos Center (1,066); Stockton, CA
November 21, 2026*; 2:00 p.m., ESPN+		at UTSA; Military City Classic						Convocation Center; San Antonio, TX
November 24, 2026*; 2:00 p.m., ESPN+		vs. Army; Rivalry / Military City Classic						Convocation Center; San Antonio, TX
November 28, 2026*; 1:00 p.m., MW+		Brown						Clune Arena; USAF Academy, CO
December 1, 2026*; 7:00 p.m., MW+		Denver						Clune Arena; USAF Academy, CO
December 6, 2026*; 12:00 p.m., MW+		Navy; Rivalry						Clune Arena; USAF Academy, CO
December 10, 2026*; 6:00 p.m., ESPN+		at Austin Peay						F&M Bank Arena; Clarksville, TN
December 18, 2026*; 6:30 p.m., MW+		Alabama State						Clune Arena; USAF Academy, CO
December 21, 2026*; 1:00 p.m., MW+		Eastern Kentucky						Clune Arena; USAF Academy, CO
December 29, 2026*; 8:00 p.m., ESPN2		at Utah						Jon M. Huntsman Center; Salt Lake City, UT
Mountain West regular season
January 5, 2027; 6:30 p.m., MW+		San Jose State						Clune Arena; USAF Academy, CO
January 9, 2027; 12:00 p.m., MW+		UTEP						Clune Arena; USAF Academy, CO
January 12, 2027; TBD, MW+		at Hawaii						Stan Sheriff Center; Honolulu, HI
January 16, 2027; 2:30 p.m., CW		New Mexico						Clune Arena; USAF Academy, CO
January 19, 2027; 8:00 p.m., MW+		at Nevada						Lawlor Events Center; Reno, NV
January 22, 2027; 9:00 p.m., FS1		Wyoming						Clune Arena; USAF Academy, CO
January 27, 2027; 8:30 p.m., FS1		at Grand Canyon						Global Credit Union Arena; Phoenix, AZ
January 30, 2027; 6:30 p.m., FS1		at New Mexico						The Pit; Albuquerque, NM
February 2, 2027; 6:30 p.m., MW+		UNLV						Clune Arena; USAF Academy, CO
February 6, 2027; 5:00 p.m., MW+		at UC Davis						University Credit Union Center; Davis, CA
February 10, 2027; 6:30 p.m., MW+		Hawaii						Clune Arena; USAF Academy, CO
February 13, 2027; TBD, MW+		at San Jose State						Provident Credit Union Event Center; San Jose, CA
February 16, 2027; 8:00 p.m., CW		Grand Canyon						Clune Arena; USAF Academy, CO
February 20, 2027; 1:00 p.m., MW+		UC Davis						Clune Arena; USAF Academy, CO
February 24, 2027; 8:30 p.m., FS1		at UNLV						Thomas & Mack Center; Paradise, NV
February 27, 2027; 1:00 p.m., MW+		at Wyoming						Arena-Auditorium; Laramie, WY
March 2, 2027; 6:30 p.m., MW+		Nevada						Clune Arena; USAF Academy, CO
March 6, 2027; 2:00 p.m., MW+		at UTEP						Don Haskins Center; El Paso, TX
Mountain West tournament
March 10, 2027; TBD, TBD		vs. TBD						Thomas & Mack Center; Paradise, NV
*Non-conference game. ^{#}Rankings from AP Poll. (#) Tournament seedings in parentheses. All times are in Mountain Time.
