= 2026–27 San Jose State Spartans men's basketball team =

American college basketball season

2026–27 San Jose State Spartans men's basketball
- Conference: Mountain West Conference
- Record: 3–2 (0–0 MW)
- Head coach: Tim Miles (6th season)
- Assistant coaches: Jeff Strohm (5th season); Ed Gipson (4th season); Maurice Riddick (1st season); Tim Marrion (4th season); Jack Townsend (2nd season)
- Home arena: Provident Credit Union Event Center (Capacity: 5,000)

2026–27 Mountain West Conference men's basketball standings
	Conf.				Overall
Team	W		L	PCT	W		L	PCT
Grand Canyon	0	–	0	–	4	–	0	1.000
UTEP	0	–	0	–	4	–	1	.800
Wyoming	0	–	0	–	4	–	1	.800
New Mexico	0	–	0	–	3	–	1	.750
Air Force	0	–	0	–	3	–	2	.600
Hawaii	0	–	0	–	3	–	2	.600
Nevada	0	–	0	–	3	–	2	.600
San Jose State	0	–	0	–	3	–	2	.600
UC Davis	0	–	0	–	3	–	2	.600
UNLV	0	–	0	–	3	–	3	.500
† 2027 Mountain West tournament winner As of November 21, 2026; Rankings from AP poll

The 2026–27 San Jose State Spartans men's basketball team will represent San Jose State University during the 2026–27 NCAA Division I men's basketball season. The Spartans will be led by sixth-year head coach Tim Miles and will play their home games at the Provident Credit Union Event Center in San Jose, California as a member of the Mountain West Conference.

== Previous season ==
San Jose State finished the 2025-26 season 9–24, 3–17 in the Mountain West Conference to finish eleventh in the conference. In the Mountain West Tournament, the Spartans defeated 6-seed Boise State in the First round before falling to 3-seed New Mexico 77-93 to end their season.

== Offseason ==
=== Departures ===
San Jose State Spartans departures
Name	Number	Pos.	Height	Weight	Year	Hometown	Reason for departure
Colby Garland	0	G	6'0"	190	Junior	Magnolia, AR	Transferred to Georgia Tech
Adrian Myers	1	F	6'6"	205	(redshirt) Sophomore	Stephens City, VA	Transferred to James Madison
Melvin Bell Jr.	4	G	6'4"	195	Freshman	Chicago, IL	Transferred to North Dakota State
Damase Coly	8	G	6'2"	171	Freshman	Dublin, CA	Departed program
Ben Roseborough	11	G	6'4"	205	(redshirt) Freshman	Sacramento, CA	Transferred to Towson
Jermaine Washington	13	G	6'1"	180	Sophomore	Hemet, CA	Transferred to New Mexico State
Eren Karakaya	14	C	6'10"	229	(redshirt) Freshman	Kütahya, Turkey	Departed program
Jaden Goodall	17	F	6'6"	175	(redshirt) Freshman	Yorba Linda, CA	Departed program
Christian Wise	20	F	6'6"	205	(redshirt) Sophomore	San Francisco, CA	Transferred to Biola
Japhet Moupadele	21	F	6'8"	220	Freshman	Lille, France	Transferred to Youngstown State
Douglas Langford	24	F	6'7"	240	Freshman	Dangriga, Belize	Transferred to Columbia
Yaphet Moundi	32	F	6'8"	237	Senior	Paris, France	Out of eligibility
Marcus Overstreet	33	F	6'9"	230	Junior	Chicago, IL	Transferred to Southern Miss
Sadraque NgaNga	99	F	6'10"	220	Senior	Luanda, Angola	Out of eligibility

=== Incoming transfers ===
San Jose State Spartans incoming transfers
Name	Number	Pos.	Height	Weight	Year	Hometown	Previous School
Mookie Cook	1	F	6'6"	215	(redshirt) Junior	Portland, OR	San Francisco
Moe Odum	5	G	6'2"	160	Fifth Year	The Bronx, NY	Arizona State
Luke Howard	9	F	6'9"	230	Graduate	Vancouver, BC, Canada	Simon Fraser
Mekhi Mason	11	G	6'4"	200	Senior	Gilbert, AZ	Wake Forest
KJ Martin Jr.	15	F	6'8"	225	Sophomore	Tampa, FL	Tulsa
Joey Chammaa	20	G	5'11"	180	(redshirt) Junior	Los Angeles, CA	Arkansas State
Robert Vaihola	22	F	6'8"	260	Graduate	San Mateo, CA	Minnesota
Zine Eddine Bedri	23	F	6'9"	235	Graduate	Tebessa, Algeria	Columbia

=== 2026 recruiting class ===
College recruiting
Name	Hometown	School	Height	Weight	Commit date
Brayden Barrett; SF	Buckeye, AZ	Verrado HS	6 ft 5 in (1.96 m)	180 lb (82 kg)	May 20, 2026
Brayden Barrett; SF	Recruit ratings: Rivals: 247Sports: ESPN: (NR)				
Aurèle Brena-Chemille; G	Toulouse, France	INSEP	6 ft 3 in (1.91 m)	203 lb (92 kg)	Jul 1, 2026
Aurèle Brena-Chemille; G	Recruit ratings: Rivals: 247Sports: ESPN: (NR)				
Moses Dau Nyangol; C	Sarasota, FL	Victory Rock Prep	7 ft 0 in (2.13 m)	215 lb (98 kg)	May 10, 2026
Moses Dau Nyangol; C	Recruit ratings: Rivals: 247Sports: ESPN: (NR)				
Rokiem Green; SG	Phoenix, AZ	Bella Vista College Prep	6 ft 2 in (1.88 m)	175 lb (79 kg)	Nov 12, 2025
Rokiem Green; SG	Recruit ratings: Rivals: 247Sports: ESPN: (82)				
Cade Krueger; CG	Pleasanton, CA	Amador Valley HS	6 ft 2 in (1.88 m)	190 lb (86 kg)	Nov 18, 2025
Cade Krueger; CG	Recruit ratings: Rivals: 247Sports: ESPN: (NR)				
Oliver Kullamäe; PG	Castaic, CA	SoCal Academy	6 ft 3 in (1.91 m)	175 lb (79 kg)	Jun 9, 2026
Oliver Kullamäe; PG	Recruit ratings: Rivals: 247Sports: ESPN: (NR)				
Overall recruit ranking: Scout: – Rivals: –
Note: In many cases, Scout, Rivals, 247Sports, On3, and ESPN may conflict in their listings of height and weight.; In these cases, the average was taken. ESPN grades are on a 100-point scale.; Sources: "2026 San Jose State Basketball Recruiting Commits". Scout.; "Scout.com Team Recruiting Rankings". Scout.; "2026 Team Ranking". Rivals.

== Roster ==
2026–27 San Jose State Spartans men's basketball team
Players
Coaches

Pos.	#	Name	Height	Weight	Year	Previous school	Hometown
G	0	Cade Krueger	6 ft 2 in (1.88 m)	190 lb (86 kg)	Fr	Amador Valley HS	Alamo, California
F	1	Mookie Cook	6 ft 6 in (1.98 m)	215 lb (98 kg)	RS Jr	San Francisco	Portland, Oregon
G	2	JaVaughn Hannah	6 ft 3 in (1.91 m)	200 lb (91 kg)	GS	Western Michigan	Mount Clemens, Michigan
G	5	Moe Odum	6 ft 1 in (1.85 m)	160 lb (73 kg)	Sr	Arizona State	Bronx, New York
G	6	Rokiem Green	6 ft 2 in (1.88 m)	175 lb (79 kg)	Fr	Bella Vista College Prep	Toronto, Ontario, Canada
G	7	Pasha Goodarzi	6 ft 3 in (1.91 m)	193 lb (88 kg)	RS Jr	Valley Christian HS	Los Gatos, California
F	9	Luke Howard	6 ft 9 in (2.06 m)	230 lb (104 kg)	GS	Simon Fraser	Vancouver, British Columbia, Canada
G	11	Mekhi Mason	6 ft 4 in (1.93 m)	200 lb (91 kg)	Sr	Wake Forest	Gilbert, Arizona
G	12	Brayden Barrett	6 ft 5 in (1.96 m)	200 lb (91 kg)	Fr	Verrado HS	Buckeye, Arizona
G	14	Oliver Kullamäe	6 ft 3 in (1.91 m)	175 lb (79 kg)	Fr	SoCal Academy	Tallinn, Estonia
F	15	KJ Martin Jr.	6 ft 8 in (2.03 m)	225 lb (102 kg)	So	Tulsa	Tampa, Florida
G	20	Joey Chammaa	5 ft 11 in (1.8 m)	180 lb (82 kg)	RS Jr	Arkansas State	Los Angeles, California
F	22	Robert Vaihola	6 ft 8 in (2.03 m)	260 lb (118 kg)	GS	Minnesota	San Mateo, California
F	23	Zine Eddine Bedri	6 ft 9 in (2.06 m)	235 lb (107 kg)	GS	Columbia	Tebessa, Algeria
C	24	Moses Dau Nyangol	7 ft 0 in (2.13 m)	215 lb (98 kg)	Fr	Victory Rock Prep	Rumbek, South Sudan
G	44	Aurèle Brena-Chemille	6 ft 3 in (1.91 m)	203 lb (92 kg)	Fr	INSEP	Toulouse, France

Head coach

- Tim Miles (Mary)

Assistant coach(es)

- Jeff Strohm (Eastern Illinois)
- Ed Gipson (Calumet College)
- Maurice Riddick (Bethune–Cookman)
- Tim Marrion (Washington State)
- Jack Townsend (San José State)

Legend

- (C) Team captain
- (S) Suspended
- (I) Ineligible
- (W) Walk-on
- Injured
- Current redshirt

Roster

== Schedule and results ==
Date time, TV	Rank^{#}	Opponent^{#}	Result	Record	High points	High rebounds	High assists	Site (attendance) city, state
Exhibition
October 24, 2026*; 6:00 p.m., TBD		Cal State East Bay	W 82–52		20 – Mason	7 – Martin Jr.	7 – Kullamäe	Provident Credit Union Event Center; San Jose, CA
Non-conference regular season
November 2, 2026*; 12:00 p.m., MW+		UTSA	W 95–74	1–0	27 – Chammaa	11 – Vaihola	6 – Tied	Provident Credit Union Event Center (2,128); San Jose, CA
November 7, 2026*; 7:00 p.m., ESPN+		at UC Irvine	L 79–91	1–1	16 – Tied	6 – Vaihola	5 – Hannah	Bren Events Center (2,312); Irvine, CA
November 12, 2026*; 7:00 p.m., MW+		UC Riverside	L 75–80	1–2	22 – Mason	7 – Vaihola	5 – Chammaa	Provident Credit Union Event Center (2,871); San Jose, CA
November 15, 2026*; 6:00 p.m., MW+		Alabama State	W 80–68	2–2	17 – Mason	8 – Vaihola	5 – Chammaa	Provident Credit Union Event Center (2,008); San Jose, CA
November 18, 2026*; 6:00 p.m., MW+		Fresno State; Battle for the Valley	W 92–86	3–2	30 – Mason	11 – Vaihola	6 – Mason	Provident Credit Union Event Center (2,808); San Jose, CA
November 22, 2026*; 9:00 p.m., FloSports		vs. Loyola Chicago; Acrisure Series Pod 4 semifinals						Acrisure Arena; Thousand Palms, CA
November 29, 2026*; TBD, FloSports		vs. Seattle/UC San Diego; Acrisure Series Pod 4						Acrisure Arena; Thousand Palms, CA
December 2, 2026*; 1:00 p.m., ESPN+		at Utah Valley						UCCU Center; Orem, UT
December 5, 2026*; 6:00 p.m., MW+		Seattle						Provident Credit Union Event Center; San Jose, CA
December 8, 2026*; 7:00 p.m., MW+		at Long Beach State						Provident Credit Union Event Center; San Jose, CA
December 12, 2026*; 6:00 p.m., MW+		Southern Utah						Provident Credit Union Event Center; San Jose, CA
December 18, 2026*; 7:00 p.m., TBD		at Stanford						Maples Pavilion; Stanford, CA
December 22, 2026*; 4:30 p.m., MW+		UC San Diego						Provident Credit Union Event Center; San Jose, CA
December 29, 2026*; 4:30 p.m., MW+		Lincoln						Provident Credit Union Event Center; San Jose, CA
Mountain West regular season
January 2, 2027; TBD, MW+		Hawaii						Provident Credit Union Event Center; San Jose, CA
January 5, 2027; TBD, MW+		at Air Force						Clune Arena; Colorado Springs, CO
January 9, 2027; TBD, MW+		UNLV						Provident Credit Union Event Center; San Jose, CA
January 13, 2027; 8:00 p.m., FS1		Grand Canyon						Provident Credit Union Event Center; San Jose, CA
January 16, 2027; TBD, MW+		at UC Davis						University Credit Union Center; Davis, CA
January 20, 2027; 8:00 p.m., FS1		at New Mexico						The Pit; Albuquerque, NM
January 23, 2027; TBD, MW+		Nevada						Provident Credit Union Event Center; San Jose, CA
January 30, 2027; TBD, MW+		at UTEP						Don Haskins Center; El Paso, TX
February 2, 2027; 7:00 p.m., ESPN+		New Mexico						Provident Credit Union Event Center; San Jose, CA
February 6, 2027; 3:00 p.m., FS1		at UNLV						Thomas & Mack Center; Paradise, NV
February 9, 2027; 7:30 p.m., FS1		UC Davis						Provident Credit Union Event Center; San Jose, CA
February 13, 2027; TBD, MW+		Air Force						Provident Credit Union Event Center; San Jose, CA
February 16, 2027; TBD, MW+		at Hawaii						Stan Sheriff Center; Honolulu, HI
February 20, 2027; TBD, MW+		Wyoming						Provident Credit Union Event Center; San Jose, CA
February 23, 2027; TBD, MW+		at Nevada						Lawlor Events Center; Reno, NV
February 26, 2027; 8:00 p.m., FS1		at Grand Canyon						Global Credit Union Arena; Phoenix, AZ
March 2, 2027; TBD, MW+		UTEP						Provident Credit Union Event Center; San Jose, CA
March 5, 2027; 8:00 p.m., FS1		at Wyoming						Arena-Auditorium; Laramie, WY
Mountain West tournament
March 10, 2027; TBD, TBD		vs. TBD						Thomas & Mack Center; Paradise, NV
*Non-conference game. ^{#}Rankings from AP Poll. (#) Tournament seedings in parentheses. All times are in Pacific Time.
