= 2026–27 New Mexico State Aggies men's basketball team =

American college basketball season

2026–27 New Mexico State Aggies men's basketball
- Conference: Conference USA
- Record: 1–3 (0–0 CUSA)
- Head coach: Jason Hooten (4th season)
- Assistant coaches: Preston Laird (3rd season); Brandon Barnes (1st season); Isaiah Brooks-Sena (1st season); Jevon Mamon (1st season)
- Home arena: Pan American Center (Capacity: 12,482)

2026–27 Conference USA men's basketball standings
	Conf.				Overall
Team	W		L	PCT	W		L	PCT
Kennesaw State	0	–	0	–	4	–	0	1.000
FIU	0	–	0	–	3	–	0	1.000
Missouri State	0	–	0	–	3	–	0	1.000
Middle Tennessee	0	–	0	–	3	–	1	.750
Western Kentucky	0	–	0	–	3	–	1	.750
Liberty	0	–	0	–	2	–	1	.667
Delaware	0	–	0	–	2	–	2	.500
Jacksonville State	0	–	0	–	2	–	2	.500
Sam Houston	0	–	0	–	2	–	2	.500
New Mexico State	0	–	0	–	1	–	3	.250
† 2027 CUSA tournament winner As of November 16, 2026; Rankings from AP poll

The 2026–27 New Mexico State Aggies men's basketball team will represent New Mexico State University during the 2026–27 NCAA Division I men's basketball season. The Aggies, led by fourth-year head coach Jason Hooten, will play their home games at Pan American Center in Las Cruces, New Mexico as a member of Conference USA.

== Previous season ==
The Aggies finished the 2025–26 season 16–18, 8–12 in CUSA play. As the 10th seed in the 2026 Conference USA men's basketball tournament, they would defeat Jacksonville State in the first round before losing to Sam Houston in the quarterfinals.

== Preseason ==
On October 8, 2026 Conference USA released their preseason rankings and awards. The Aggies were predicted to finish sixth place in the conference.

=== Preseason rankings ===
Conference USA Preseason Poll
Place	Team	Votes
1	Western Kentucky	94 (5)
2	Kennesaw State	90 (3)
3	Liberty	79 (2)
4	Sam Houston	64
5	Middle Tennessee	57
6	New Mexico State	56
7	Jacksonville State	36
8	Missouri State	28
9	Florida International	25
10	Delaware	21
(#) first-place votes

== Roster ==
2026–27 New Mexico State Aggies men's basketball team
Players
Coaches

Pos.	#	Name	Height	Weight	Year	Previous school	Hometown
G	0	DJ Dudley	6 ft 3 in (1.91 m)	—	Sr	Louisiana Tech	Okinawa, Japan
G	1	Gabe Pickens	6 ft 0 in (1.83 m)	—	Jr	Dream City Christian	Phoenix, Arizona
G	2	Omarr Smith	6 ft 4 in (1.93 m)	—	RS Fr	Baltimore City College	Baltimore, Maryland
G	3	Caden Deffebaugh	6 ft 5 in (1.96 m)	—	Fr	Frisco Memorial High School	Frisco, Texas
F	4	Jae'Coby Osborne	6 ft 6 in (1.98 m)	—	Jr	Bella Vista Prep	Navasota, Texas
G	5	Jachai Cantave	6 ft 1 in (1.85 m)	—	Fr	Atascocita High School	Houston, Texas
G	7	KK Robinson	6 ft 0 in (1.83 m)	—	GS	Little Rock	Little Rock, Arkansas
G	11	DeLan Grant	6 ft 2 in (1.88 m)	—	Fr	Sierra Canyon School	Los Angeles, California
G	13	Jermaine Washington	6 ft 1 in (1.85 m)	—	Jr	Rancho Verde High School	Hemet, California
C	15	Adrame Diongue	7 ft 0 in (2.13 m)	—	Sr	AZ Compass Prep	Dakar, Senegal
F	20	Stephon Payne (5th)	6 ft 9 in (2.06 m)	—	Sr	Seton Hall	Jacksonville, Florida
G	21	Gabe Warren	6 ft 6 in (1.98 m)	—	Sr	Holy Cross	Plano, Texas
F	24	Leopold Levillain	6 ft 9 in (2.06 m)	—	So	Long Beach State	Montpellier, France
F	30	Phoenix Woodson	6 ft 8 in (2.03 m)	—	Fr	Dynamic Prep	Edmond, Oklahoma
F	32	Mark Lavrenov	6 ft 8 in (2.03 m)	—	So	Rocklin High School	Rocklin, California

Head coach

- Jason Hooten (Tarleton State)

Assistant coach(es)

- Preston Laird (Memphis)
- Brandon Barnes (Cal State Bakersfield)
- Isaiah Brooks-Sena (New Mexico)
- Jevon Mamon (Barat College)

Legend

- (C) Team captain
- (S) Suspended
- (I) Ineligible
- (W) Walk-on
- (5th) Fifth-year senior
- Injured
- Current redshirt

Roster
Last update: October 25, 2026

== Schedule and results ==
Date time, TV	Rank^{#}	Opponent^{#}	Result	Record	High points	High rebounds	High assists	Site (attendance) city, state
Non-Conference Regular Season
November 3, 2026; 3:30 p.m., ESPN+		Western New Mexico	W 73–66	1–0	22 – Dudley	10 – Lavrenov	5 – Pickens	Pan American Center (4,996); Las Cruce, NM
November 7th, 2026; 3:00 p.m., ESPN Unlimited		at No. 15 Gonzaga	L 68–109	1–1	19 – Lavernov	5 – Tied	5 – Pickens	McCarthey Athletic Center (6,000); Spokane, WA
November 12, 2026; 7:00 p.m., MW+		at UTEP; Battle of I-10	L 58-60	1-2	16 – Washington	8 – Tied	4 – Pickens	Don Haskins Center (6,180); El Paso, TX
November 15, 2026; 1:30 p.m., The CW		vs. San Diego State; Compete 4 Cause Classic	L 61-73	1-3	18 – Dudley	7 – Osborne	3 – Dudley	Frontwave Arena; Oceanside, CA
November 19, 2026; 7:00 p.m., ESPN+		UTEP; Battle of I-10						Pan American Center; Las Cruces, NM
November 22, 2026; 12:30 p.m.		vs. Robert Morris; Jacksonville Classic						The Reef; Jacksonville, FL
November 24th, 2026; 9:00 a.m.		vs. Ohio; Jacksonville Classic						The Reef; Jacksonville, FL
November 28, 2026; 1:00 p.m., ESPN+		Denver						Pan American Center; Las Cruces, NM
December 5, 2026; 12:15 p.m., The CW		at New Mexico; Rio Grande Rivalry						The Pit; Albuquerque, NM
December 9, 2026; 8:00 p.m.		at Saint Mary's						University Credit Union Pavilion; Moraga, CA
December 15, 2026; 6:30 p.m., ESPN+		Pacific						Pan American Center; Las Cruces, NM
December 17, 2026; 8:30 p.m., ESPN+		Southwest (NM)						Pan American Center; Las Cruces, NM
December 21, 2026; 6:30 p.m., ESPN+		Nelson (AZ)						Pan American Center; Las Cruces, NM
Conference USA Regular Season
December 31, 2026; 2:00 p.m., ESPN+		FIU						Pan American Center; Las Cruces, NM
January 2nd, 2027; 2:00 p.m., ESPN+		Missouri State						Pan American Center; Las Cruces, NM
January 7, 2027; 5:30 p.m., ESPN+		at Western Kentucky						E.A. Diddle Arena; Bowling Green, KY
January 9, 2027; 4:00 p.m.		at Middle Tennesee						Murphy Center; Murfreesboro, TN
January 14, 2027; 6:30 p.m., ESPN+		Jacksonville State						Pan American Center; Las Cruces, NM
January 16, 2027; 2:00 p.m., ESPN+		Kennesaw State						Pan American Center; Las Cruces, NM
January 23, 2027; 2:00 p.m., ESPN+		Sam Houston						Pan American Center; Las Cruces, NM
January 28, 2027; 5:00 p.m.		at Delaware						Bob Carpenter Center; Newark, DE
January 30, 2027; 2:00 p.m., ESPN+		at Liberty						Liberty Arena; Lynchburg, VA
February 4, 2027; 6:30 p.m., ESPN+		Middle Tennessee						Pan American Center; Las Cruces, NM
February 6, 2027; 2:00 p.m., ESPN+		Western Kentucky						Pan American Center; Las Cruces, NM
February 11, 2027; 5:00 p.m., ESPN+		at Kennesaw State						Convocation Center; Kennesaw, GA
February 13, 2027; 5:00 p.m., ESPN+		at Jacksonville State						Pete Mathews Coliseum; Jacksonville, AL
February 20, 2027; 12:00 p.m., ESPNU		at Sam Houston						Bernard Johnson Coliseum; Huntsville, TX
February 25, 2027; 6:30 p.m., ESPN+		Liberty						Pan American Center; Las Cruces, NM
February 27, 2027; 1:00 p.m., ESPN+		Delaware						Pan American Center; Las Cruces, NM
March 4, 2027; 6:00 p.m.		at Missouri State						Great Southern Bank Arena; Springfield, MO
March 6, 2027; 12:00 p.m.		at FIU						Ocean Bank Convocation Center; Miami, FL
*Non-conference game. ^{#}Rankings from AP Poll. (#) Tournament seedings in parentheses. All times are in Mountain Time.
