= 2026–27 Western Kentucky Hilltoppers basketball team =

American college basketball season

2026–27 Western Kentucky Hilltoppers basketball
- Conference: Conference USA
- Record: 5–2 (0–0 CUSA)
- Head coach: Hank Plona (3rd season)
- Assistant coaches: Martin Cross; Josh Newman; Eric Murphy; Nate Laing; Darryl Jackson
- Home arena: E. A. Diddle Arena

2026–27 Conference USA men's basketball standings
	Conf.				Overall
Team	W		L	PCT	W		L	PCT
Missouri State	0	–	0	–	5	–	0	1.000
Kennesaw State	0	–	0	–	5	–	1	.833
Liberty	0	–	0	–	4	–	1	.800
FIU	0	–	0	–	3	–	1	.750
Middle Tennessee	0	–	0	–	5	–	2	.714
Delaware	0	–	0	–	4	–	2	.667
Western Kentucky	0	–	0	–	4	–	2	.667
Jacksonville State	0	–	0	–	3	–	3	.500
Sam Houston	0	–	0	–	3	–	3	.500
New Mexico State	0	–	0	–	1	–	4	.200
† 2027 CUSA tournament winner As of November 22, 2026; Rankings from AP poll

The 2026–27 Western Kentucky Hilltoppers men's basketball team represents Western Kentucky University during the 2026–27 NCAA Division I men's basketball season. The team is led by third-year head coach Hank Plona and plays their home games at E. A. Diddle Arena in Bowling Green, Kentucky as thirteenth-year members of Conference USA.

== Previous season ==
The Hilltoppers finished the 2025–26 season 18–14, 11–9 in C-USA play to finish in 3rd place. As the No. 3 seed in the C-USA tournament, they were defeated by Kennesaw State in the first round.

== Roster ==
2026–27 Western Kentucky Hilltoppers men's basketball team
Players
Coaches

Pos.	#	Name	Height	Weight	Year	Hometown
G	1	Gavin Murphy	5 ft 11 in (1.8 m)	160 lb (73 kg)	Fr	Nicholasville, KY
G	2	LJ Hackman	6 ft 3 in (1.91 m)	205 lb (93 kg)	Sr	Columbus, MS
G	3	Sharron Young	6 ft 0 in (1.83 m)	165 lb (75 kg)	Jr	Morgantown, WV
G	4	Kade Unseld	6 ft 5 in (1.96 m)	200 lb (91 kg)	RS So	Bowling Green, KY
G	5	Noah Norgaard	6 ft 2 in (1.88 m)	195 lb (88 kg)	So	Copenhagen, Denmark
F	6	EJ Walker	6 ft 8 in (2.03 m)	235 lb (107 kg)	So	Erlanger, KY
F	11	Gabe Weis	6 ft 7 in (2.01 m)	215 lb (98 kg)	Fr	Springfield, KY
G	12	Armelo Boone	6 ft 5 in (1.96 m)	190 lb (86 kg)	So	Lexington, KY
F	13	Emondrek Erkins-Ford	6 ft 9 in (2.06 m)	220 lb (100 kg)	Sr	Chicago, IL
G	23	Trevion LaBeaux	6 ft 5 in (1.96 m)	210 lb (95 kg)	GS	Waterloo, IA
G	24	Lawson Rice	6 ft 6 in (1.98 m)	200 lb (91 kg)	RS Fr	Morgantown, KY
G	30	Teagan Moore	6 ft 6 in (1.98 m)	220 lb (100 kg)	RS Jr	Dry Ridge, KY
F	32	Moussa Konare	6 ft 10 in (2.08 m)	220 lb (100 kg)	So	Bamako, Mali
F	35	Joseph Adebayo	6 ft 10 in (2.08 m)	230 lb (104 kg)	Fr	Ondo, Nigeria

Head coach

Hank Plona (Providence)

Assistant coach(es)

- Martin Cross (Western Kentucky)
- Josh Newman (Arizona State)
- Eric Murphy (Slippery Rock)
- Nate Laing (UCF)
- Darryl Jackson (Valparaiso)

Legend

- (C) Team captain
- (S) Suspended
- (I) Ineligible
- (W) Walk-on
- Injured
- Current redshirt

Roster
Last update: October 26, 2026

== Schedule and results ==
Date time, TV	Rank^{#}	Opponent^{#}	Result	Record	High points	High rebounds	High assists	Site (attendance) city, state
Exhibition
October 20, 2026*; 6:30 p.m.		Bowling Green; Battle for Bowling Green	W 65–62	–	22 – Moore	8 – Tied	3 – Tied	E. A. Diddle Arena (2,102); Bowling Green, KY
October 25, 2026*; 3 p.m., B1G+		vs. Indiana	L 74–79	–	30 – Moore	8 – Hackman	4 – Boone	Ford Center (7,522); Evansville, IN
Non-conference regular season
November 2, 2026*; 6:30 p.m., ESPN+		Morehead State	W 83–58	1–0	17 – Moore	9 – Boone	6 – Young	E. A. Diddle Arena (3,245); Bowling Green, KY
November 5, 2026*; 6:30 p.m., ESPN+		Kentucky Wesleyan	W 82–48	2–0	26 – Moore	8 – Konare	5 – Tied	E. A. Diddle Arena (3,215); Bowling Green, KY
November 8, 2026*; 2 p.m., ESPN+		at Tennessee Tech	L 94–97	2–1	22 – Moore	11 – Moore	5 – Young	Hooper Eblen Center (2,237); Cookeville, TN
November 11, 2026*; 6:30 p.m., ESPN+		Campbellsville	W 78–51	3–1	14 – Erkins-Ford	6 – Young	6 – Young	E. A. Diddle Arena (2,723); Bowling Green, KY
November 16, 2026*; 6 p.m., ESPNU		at Tulsa	L 64–67	3–2	19 – Moore	6 – Boone	2 – Tied	Reynolds Center (3,267); Tulsa, OK
November 20, 2026*; 6 p.m., PassThaBall		vs. Richmond; Greenbrier Tip-Off	W 82–68	4–2	22 – Moore	10 – Boone	6 – Young	The Greenbrier; White Sulphur Springs, WV
November 22, 2026*; 1 p.m., CBSSN		vs. George Washington; Greenbrier Tip-Off	W 86–78	5–2	19 – Moore	7 – Tied	6 – Young	The Greenbrier (568); White Sulphur Springs, WV
November 27, 2026*; 5 p.m., FS1		at Illinois						State Farm Center; Champaign, IL
December 1, 2026*; 6:30 p.m., ESPN+		Belmont						E. A. Diddle Arena; Bowling Green, KY
December 5, 2026*; 1 p.m., ESPN+		at Evansville						Ford Center; Evansville, IN
December 12, 2026*; 6 p.m., ESPN+		UAB						E. A. Diddle Arena; Bowling Green, KY
December 16, 2026*; 6:30 p.m., ESPN+		Lipscomb						E. A. Diddle Arena; Bowling Green, KY
December 22, 2026*; 11 a.m., Spiideo		vs. Tulane; Scout Holiday FestiBall						Rick Case Arena; Davie, FL
December 28, 2026*; 6:30 p.m., ESPN+		Bethel (TN)						E. A. Diddle Arena; Bowling Green, KY
Conference regular season
December 31, 2026; 5 p.m., ESPN2		at Kennesaw State						Convocation Center; Kennesaw, GA
January 2, 2027; 4 p.m., ESPN+		at Jacksonville State						Pete Mathews Coliseum; Jacksonville, AL
January 7, 2027; 6:30 p.m., ESPN+		New Mexico State						E. A. Diddle Arena; Bowling Green, KY
January 9, 2027; 3 p.m., CBSSN		Sam Houston						E. A. Diddle Arena; Bowling Green, KY
January 14, 2027; 6 p.m., ESPN+		at Delaware						Bob Carpenter Center; Newark, DE
January 16, 2027; 11 a.m., CBSSN		at Liberty						Liberty Arena; Lynchburg, VA
January 21, 2027; 8 p.m., CBSSN		Missouri State						E. A. Diddle Arena; Bowling Green, KY
January 23, 2027; 6 p.m., ESPN+		FIU						E. A. Diddle Arena; Bowling Green, KY
January 30, 2027; 3 p.m., CBSSN		Middle Tennessee						E. A. Diddle Arena; Bowling Green, KY
February 4, 2027; 7 p.m., CBSSN		at Sam Houston						Bernard Johnson Coliseum; Huntsville, TX
February 6, 2027; 3 p.m., ESPN+		at New Mexico State						Pan American Center; Las Cruces, NM
February 11, 2027; 8 p.m., CBSSN		Liberty						E. A. Diddle Arena; Bowling Green, KY
February 13, 2027; 6 p.m., ESPN+		Delaware						E. A. Diddle Arena; Bowling Green, KY
February 18, 2027; 6 p.m., ESPN+		at FIU						Ocean Bank Convocation Center; Miami, FL
February 20, 2027; 2 p.m., ESPN+		at Missouri State						Great Southern Bank Arena; Springfield, MO
February 27, 2027; 1 p.m., CBSSN		at Middle Tennessee						Murphy Center; Murfreesboro, TN
March 4, 2027; 6:30 p.m., ESPN+		Jacksonville State						E. A. Diddle Arena; Bowling Green, KY
March 6, 2027; 2 p.m., ESPN+		Kennesaw State						E. A. Diddle Arena; Bowling Green, KY
Conference USA Tournament
March 9–March 13, 2027; TBA		vs.						Propst Arena; Huntsville, AL
*Non-conference game. ^{#}Rankings from AP poll. (#) Tournament seedings in parentheses. All times are in Central Time.
