= 2026–27 Grand Canyon Antelopes men's basketball team =

American college basketball season

2026–27 Grand Canyon Antelopes men's basketball
- Conference: Mountain West Conference
- Record: 4–0 (0–0 MW)
- Head coach: Bryce Drew (7th season)
- Assistant coaches: Casey Shaw (7th season); Marc Rodgers (4th season); Matt Lottich (2nd season); Jordan McCabe (2nd season); Isaac Demosthenes (1st season)
- Home arena: Global Credit Union Arena (Capacity: 7,000)

2026–27 Mountain West Conference men's basketball standings
	Conf.				Overall
Team	W		L	PCT	W		L	PCT
Grand Canyon	0	–	0	–	4	–	0	1.000
UNLV	0	–	0	–	3	–	0	1.000
Hawaii	0	–	0	–	3	–	1	.750
New Mexico	0	–	0	–	3	–	1	.750
UC Davis	0	–	0	–	3	–	1	.750
Wyoming	0	–	0	–	3	–	1	.750
UTEP	0	–	0	–	2	–	1	.667
Air Force	0	–	0	–	3	–	2	.600
Nevada	0	–	0	–	2	–	2	.500
San Jose State	0	–	0	–	2	–	2	.500
† 2027 Mountain West tournament winner As of November 17, 2026; Rankings from AP poll

The 2026–27 Grand Canyon Antelopes men's basketball team represents Grand Canyon University during the 2026–27 NCAA Division I men's basketball season. The Antelopes, led by seventh-year head coach Bryce Drew, play their home games at the Global Credit Union Arena in Phoenix, Arizona as a member of the Mountain West Conference (MW).

== Previous season ==
In their first MW season, Grand Canyon finished the 2025–26 season 20–12, 13–7 in the MW to finish tied for third in the conference. In the Mountain West Tournament, the Antelopes were defeated by 5-seed Nevada 80–84 to end their season. Grand Canyon failed to make the NCAA Tournament for the first time since 2022.

== Offseason ==
=== Departures ===
Grand Canyon Antelopes departures
Name	Number	Pos.	Height	Weight	Year	Hometown	Reason for departure
Braylon Johnson	3	G/F	6'7"	210	(redshirt) Freshman	Moon Township, PA	Entered transfer portal
Brian Moore Jr.	5	G	6'2"	190	Graduate	Harlem, NY	Out of eligibility
Dusty Stromer	8	G	6'6"	195	Junior	Sherman Oaks, CA	Transferred to San Diego
Evan Boisdur	9	G	6'1"	175	Freshman	Les Abymes, France	Transferred to Abilene Christian
Dennis Evans	14	C	7'2"	240	(redshirt) Freshman	Riverside, CA	Transferred to Oregon State
Kaleb Smith	22	F	6'10"	245	(redshirt) Junior	Rancho Cucamonga, CA	Transferred to Long Beach State
Cole Pepe	23	G	6'4"	190	Freshman	Scottsdale, AZ	Entered transfer portal
Nana Owusu-Anane	31	F	6'8"	240	Graduate	Burlington, ON, Canada	Out of eligibility
Wilhelm Breidenbach	32	F	6'10"	235	Graduate	Rancho Santa Margarita, CA	Out of eligibility

=== Incoming transfers ===
Grand Canyon Antelopes incoming transfers
Name	Number	Pos.	Height	Weight	Year	Hometown	Previous School
Omaha Biliew	0	F	6'8"	230	Senior	Waukee, IA	Wake Forest
Dylan Darling	1	G	6'1"	175	(redshirt) Senior	Spokane, WA	St. John's
Amarion Dickerson	3	G/F	6'7"	200	Graduate	Cleveland, OH	USC
Micah Tucker	5	G	6'3"	190	Sophomore	Atlanta, GA	Georgia State
Dan Skillings Jr.	8	G	6'6"	205	Graduate	Blackwood, NJ	Baylor
Tyler Behrend	9	F	6'10"	220	Senior	Cincinnati, OH	Tulsa
Blake Barkley	13	F	6'8"	220	(redshirt) Junior	Morgantown, WV	East Tennessee State
Tre Holloman	22	G	6'2"	195	Graduate	Minneapolis, MN	NC State
Jaqari Miles	23	G	6'2"	210	(redshirt) Junior	Los Angeles, CA	Fullerton College
Jaden Zimmerman	24	G	6'5"	205	Junior	Bronx, NY	Quinnipiac

=== 2026 recruiting class ===
College recruiting
Name	Hometown	School	Height	Weight	Commit date
John Whorton; PF/C	Akron, OH	Athletes in Action Prep	6 ft 9 in (2.06 m)	240 lb (110 kg)	May 10, 2026
John Whorton; PF/C	Recruit ratings: Rivals: 247Sports: ESPN: (NR)				
Overall recruit ranking: Scout: – Rivals: –
Note: In many cases, Scout, Rivals, 247Sports, On3, and ESPN may conflict in their listings of height and weight.; In these cases, the average was taken. ESPN grades are on a 100-point scale.; Sources: "2026 Grand Canyon Basketball Recruiting Commits". Scout.; "Scout.com Team Recruiting Rankings". Scout.; "2026 Team Ranking". Rivals.

== Roster ==
2026–27 Grand Canyon Antelopes men's basketball team
Players
Coaches

Pos.	#	Name	Height	Weight	Year	Previous school	Hometown
F	0	Omaha Biliew	6 ft 8 in (2.03 m)	230 lb (104 kg)	Sr	Wake Forest	Waukee, IA
G	1	Dylan Darling	6 ft 1 in (1.85 m)	175 lb (79 kg)	GS	St. John's	Spokane, WA
G	2	Makaih Williams	6 ft 2 in (1.88 m)	190 lb (86 kg)	Sr	UT Arlington	Long Beach, CA
G/F	3	Amarion Dickerson	6 ft 7 in (2.01 m)	200 lb (91 kg)	GS	USC	Cleveland, OH
G	5	Micah Tucker	6 ft 3 in (1.91 m)	190 lb (86 kg)	So	Georgia State	Atlanta, GA
G	8	Dan Skillings Jr. (I)	6 ft 6 in (1.98 m)	205 lb (93 kg)	GS	Baylor	Blackwood, NJ
F	9	Tyler Behrend	6 ft 10 in (2.08 m)	220 lb (100 kg)	Sr	Tulsa	Cincinnati, OH
G	10	Jaden Henley	6 ft 7 in (2.01 m)	210 lb (95 kg)	GS	UNLV	Ontario, CA
G	11	Caleb Shaw	6 ft 6 in (1.98 m)	215 lb (98 kg)	GS	Colorado	Phoenix, AZ
F	13	Blake Barkley	6 ft 8 in (2.03 m)	220 lb (100 kg)	Sr	East Tennessee State	Morgantown, WV
C	17	Efe Demirel	7 ft 1 in (2.16 m)	240 lb (109 kg)	So	Pinar Karşıyaka	İzmit, Turkey
F	21	Jack Sawyer	6 ft 8 in (2.03 m)	230 lb (104 kg)	Jr	Abilene Christian	Aledo, TX
G	22	Tre Holloman	6 ft 2 in (1.88 m)	195 lb (88 kg)	GS	NC State	Minneapolis, MN
G	23	Jaqari Miles	6 ft 2 in (1.88 m)	210 lb (95 kg)	Sr	Fullerton College	Los Angeles, CA
G	24	Jaden Zimmerman	6 ft 5 in (1.96 m)	205 lb (93 kg)	Jr	Quinnipiac	Bronx, NY
F	33	John Whorton	6 ft 8 in (2.03 m)	—	Fr	Athletes in Action Prep	Akron, OH
G	99	Luke Shaw	6 ft 3 in (1.91 m)	185 lb (84 kg)	So	Athletes in Action Prep	Phoenix, AZ

Head coach

- Bryce Drew (Valparaiso)

Assistant coach(es)

- Casey Shaw (Toledo)
- Marc Rodgers (Central Washington)
- Matt Lottich (Stanford)
- Jordan McCabe (UNLV)
- Isaac Demosthenes (Grand Canyon)

Legend

- (C) Team captain
- (S) Suspended
- (I) Ineligible
- (W) Walk-on
- Injured
- Current redshirt

Roster

== Schedule and results ==
Date time, TV	Rank^{#}	Opponent^{#}	Result	Record	High points	High rebounds	High assists	Site (attendance) city, state
Exhibition
October 27, 2026*; 7:00 p.m., MW+		Western New Mexico	W 82–59		14 – Williams	11 – Henley	6 – Holloman	Global Credit Union Arena (7,098); Phoenix, AZ
Non-conference regular season
November 2, 2026*; 7:00 p.m., KSAZ-TV/MW+		Texas Southern	W 103–79	1–0	22 – Henley	8 – Behrend	6 – Tied	Global Credit Union Arena (6,782); Phoenix, AZ
November 7, 2026*; 6:00 p.m., MW+		Bethune–Cookman	W 99–81	2–0	21 – Henley	7 – Demirel	5 – Holloman	Global Credit Union Arena (7,055); Phoenix, AZ
November 11, 2026*; 7:00 p.m., MW+		Cal Poly	W 99–71	3–0	16 – Barkley	7 – Behrend	6 – Holloman	Global Credit Union Arena (6,880); Phoenix, AZ
November 14, 2026*; 6:00 p.m., MW+		Louisiana–Monroe	W 88–52	4–0	18 – Henley	8 – Demirel	6 – Darling	Global Credit Union Arena; Phoenix, AZ
November 24, 2026*; 7:30 p.m., CBSSN		vs. Saint Louis; Acrisure Series Pod 2 semifinals						Acrisure Arena; Thousand Palms, CA
November 25, 2026*; TBD, CBSSN		vs. Stanford/Colorado; Acrisure Series Pod 2						Acrisure Arena; Thousand Palms, CA
November 29, 2026*; 6:00 p.m., MW+		Incarnate Word						Global Credit Union Arena; Phoenix, AZ
December 2, 2026*; 6:00 p.m., ESPN+		at Oklahoma State						Gallagher-Iba Arena; Stillwater, OK
December 5, 2026*; 6:00 p.m., MW+		Santa Clara						Global Credit Union Arena; Phoenix, AZ
December 8, 2026*; 7:00 p.m., MW+		at Northwestern State						Global Credit Union Arena; Phoenix, AZ
December 11, 2026*; 6:00 p.m., TBD		at Memphis						FedExForum; Memphis, TN
December 18, 2026*; 4:00 p.m., ESPNU		vs. Florida; Jacksonville Hoops Showdown						VyStar Veterans Memorial Arena; Jacksonville, FL
December 22, 2026*; 6:00 p.m., MW+		UMBC						Global Credit Union Arena; Phoenix, AZ
December 29, 2026*; 6:00 p.m., MW+		Justice						Global Credit Union Arena; Phoenix, AZ
Mountain West regular season
January 2, 2027; 6:00 p.m., MW+		at UC Davis						University Credit Union Center; Davis, CA
January 5, 2027; 8:30 p.m., FS1		UNLV						Global Credit Union Arena; Phoenix, AZ
January 9, 2027; 2:30 p.m., CW		Wyoming						Global Credit Union Arena; Phoenix, AZ
January 13, 2027; 9:00 p.m., MW+		at San Jose State						Provident Credit Union Event Center; San Jose, CA
January 16, 2027; 8:00 p.m., MW+		at Nevada						Lawlor Events Center; Reno, NV
January 20, 2027; 6:00 p.m., CW		Hawaii						Global Credit Union Arena; Phoenix, AZ
January 23, 2027; 2:30 p.m., CW		at New Mexico						The Pit; Albuquerque, NM
January 27, 2027; 8:30 p.m., FS1		Air Force						Global Credit Union Arena; Phoenix, AZ
January 30, 2027; 8:00 p.m., CBSSN		at Wyoming						Arena-Auditorium; Laramie, WY
February 6, 2027; 4:30 p.m., CBSSN		New Mexico						Global Credit Union Arena; Phoenix, AZ
February 9, 2027; 8:00 p.m., CBSSN		at UTEP						Don Haskins Center; El Paso, TX
February 13, 2027; 2:00 p.m., FS1		Nevada						Global Credit Union Arena; Phoenix, AZ
February 16, 2027; 8:00 p.m., ESPN+		at Air Force						Clune Arena; USAF Academy, CO
February 20, 2027; 6:00 p.m., CBSSN		at UNLV						Thomas & Mack Center; Paradise, NV
February 23, 2027; 8:00 p.m., ESPN+		UTEP						Global Credit Union Arena; Phoenix, AZ
February 26, 2027; 9:00 p.m., FS1		San Jose State						Global Credit Union Arena; Phoenix, AZ
March 3, 2027; 9:00 p.m., FS1		at Hawaii						Stan Sheriff Center; Honolulu, HI
March 6, 2027; 1:00 p.m., ESPN+		UC Davis						Global Credit Union Arena; Phoenix, AZ
Mountain West tournament
March 10, 2027; TBD, TBD		vs. TBD						Thomas & Mack Center; Paradise, NV
*Non-conference game. ^{#}Rankings from AP Poll. (#) Tournament seedings in parentheses. All times are in Mountain Time.
