= 2026–27 UTEP Miners men's basketball team =

American college basketball season

2026–27 UTEP Miners men's basketball
- Conference: Mountain West
- Record: 3–1 (0–0 MW)
- Head coach: Joe Golding (6th season)
- Associate head coach: Jeremy Cox (2nd, 5th overall season)
- Assistant coaches: Joseph Jones (1st season); Dan Russell (1st season); Patrice Days (1st season)
- Home arena: Don Haskins Center (Capacity: 11,892)

2026–27 Mountain West Conference men's basketball standings
	Conf.				Overall
Team	W		L	PCT	W		L	PCT
Grand Canyon	0	–	0	–	4	–	0	1.000
UNLV	0	–	0	–	3	–	0	1.000
Hawaii	0	–	0	–	3	–	1	.750
New Mexico	0	–	0	–	3	–	1	.750
UC Davis	0	–	0	–	3	–	1	.750
Wyoming	0	–	0	–	3	–	1	.750
UTEP	0	–	0	–	2	–	1	.667
Air Force	0	–	0	–	3	–	2	.600
Nevada	0	–	0	–	2	–	2	.500
San Jose State	0	–	0	–	2	–	2	.500
† 2027 Mountain West tournament winner As of November 17, 2026; Rankings from AP poll

The 2026–27 UTEP Miners men's basketball team will represent the University of Texas at El Paso during the 2026–27 NCAA Division I men's basketball season. The Miners will be led by sixth-year head coach Joe Golding and will play their home games at the Don Haskins Center in El Paso, Texas as a member of the Mountain West Conference. This will mark UTEP's first season as members of the Mountain West Conference after spending the previous twenty-one seasons as members of Conference USA.

== Previous season ==
The UTEP finished the 2025-26 season 11–20, 7–13 in Conference USA to finish eleventh in the conference. The Miners did not qualify for the Conference USA Tournament.

== Offseason ==
=== Departures ===
UTEP Miners departures
Name	Number	Pos.	Height	Weight	Year	Hometown	Reason for departure
David Tubek	0	F	6'7"	220	Junior	Juba, South Sudan	Transferred to USC Upstate
KJ Thomas	1	G	6'1"	175	Sophomore	Amarillo, TX	Transferred to West Texas A&M
Jordan Hernandez	2	G	5'11"	175	(redshirt) Junior	El Paso, TX	Departed program
Bobby Montgomery Jr.	3	G	6'5"	200	Freshman	Baltimore, MD	Transferred to Binghamton
Caleb Blackwell	4	G	6'1"	185	Junior	Buford, GA	Transferred to Tarleton State
Tyreese Watson	5	G	6'4"	190	Senior	Philadelphia, PA	Entered transfer portal
C.J. Smith	6	F	6'7"	210	Sophomore	Oklahoma City, OK	Transferred to Arkansas-Pine Bluff
LA Hayes	7	G	6'5"	185	Junior	Cleveland, OH	Transferred to Southern Indiana
Trey Horton III	11	G	6'5"	205	Junior	Charlotte, NC	Transferred to Lincoln Memorial
Kaseem Watson	13	F	6'9"	200	Junior	Philadelphia, PA	Transferred to East Carolina
Jamal West Jr.	15	F	6'6"	225	Senior	Baltimore, MD	Out of eligibility
Cassius Brooks	23	G	6'0"	185	Senior	Chicago, IL	Out of eligibility
Mouhamed Mbaye	25	C	6'10"	235	Junior	Saint-Louis, Senegal	Transferred to Nebraska-Kearney
Elijah Jones	33	F	6'8"	220	Junior	Pleasantville, NJ	Transferred to George Mason

=== Incoming transfers ===
UTEP Miners incoming transfers
Name	Number	Pos.	Height	Weight	Year	Hometown	Previous School
Mikey Kelvin II	1	F	6'8"	210	(redshirt) Senior	Kingston, ON	FIU
Reese Miller	3	G	6'5"	185	(redshirt) Senior	Round Rock, TX	William & Mary
Cam McDaniels	5	G	6'5"	220	Sophomore	Louisville, KY	John A. Logan College
Leif Moeller	6	G	6'7"	215	Sophomore	Wedel, Germany	Evansville
Janusz Ratowski	9	F	6'11"	235	(redshirt) Sophomore	Chotomów, Poland	Stetson
Augusto Cassia	11	F	6'10"	230	Senior	Salvador, BA, Brazil	Ole Miss
Ryan Jackson Jr.	15	G/F	6'6"	215	Junior	Mesa, AZ	William & Mary
Jace Whiting	21	G	6'3"	195	(redshirt) Senior	Burley, ID	Weber State
Reid Cason	24	F	6'10"	235	Junior	Kingston, OK	East Carolina

=== 2026 recruiting class ===
College recruiting
Name	Hometown	School	Height	Weight	Commit date
Donovan Criss; SF	San Antonio, TX	William J. Brennan HS	6 ft 5 in (1.96 m)	180 lb (82 kg)	Nov 18, 2025
Donovan Criss; SF	Recruit ratings: Rivals: 247Sports: ESPN: (80)				
Ivan Perasovic; SF	Split, Croatia	KK Split	6 ft 8 in (2.03 m)	210 lb (95 kg)	Aug 6, 2026
Ivan Perasovic; SF	Recruit ratings: Rivals: 247Sports: ESPN: (NR)				
Delano Tarpley; C	San Antonio, TX	William J. Brennan HS	6 ft 11 in (2.11 m)	245 lb (111 kg)	Nov 18, 2025
Delano Tarpley; C	Recruit ratings: Rivals: 247Sports: ESPN: (79)				
Youssouf Traore; C	Bamako, Mali	Casademont Zaragoza	6 ft 10 in (2.08 m)	215 lb (98 kg)	Sep 6, 2026
Youssouf Traore; C	Recruit ratings: Rivals: 247Sports: ESPN: (NR)				
Isaiah Ward; PF	San Antonio, TX	William J. Brennan HS	6 ft 6 in (1.98 m)	185 lb (84 kg)	Mar 24, 2026
Isaiah Ward; PF	Recruit ratings: Rivals: 247Sports: ESPN: (79)				
Overall recruit ranking: Scout: – Rivals: –
Note: In many cases, Scout, Rivals, 247Sports, On3, and ESPN may conflict in their listings of height and weight.; In these cases, the average was taken. ESPN grades are on a 100-point scale.; Sources: "2026 UTEP Basketball Recruiting Commits". Scout.; "Scout.com Team Recruiting Rankings". Scout.; "2026 Team Ranking". Rivals.

== Roster ==
2026–27 UTEP Miners men's basketball team
Players
Coaches

Pos.	#	Name	Height	Weight	Year	Previous school	Hometown
G	0	Donovan Criss	6 ft 5 in (1.96 m)	195 lb (88 kg)	Fr	William J. Brennan HS	San Antonio, Texas
F	1	Mikey Kelvin II	6 ft 8 in (2.03 m)	210 lb (95 kg)	RS Sr	FIU	Kingston, Ontario
C	2	Delano Tarpley	6 ft 11 in (2.11 m)	215 lb (98 kg)	Fr	William J. Brennan HS	San Antonio, Texas
G	3	Reese Miller	6 ft 5 in (1.96 m)	185 lb (84 kg)	RS Sr	William & Mary	Round Rock, Texas
G	5	Cam McDaniels	6 ft 5 in (1.96 m)	220 lb (100 kg)	So	John A. Logan College	Louisville, Kentucky
G	6	Leif Moeller	6 ft 7 in (2.01 m)	215 lb (98 kg)	So	Evansville	Wedel, Germany
F	8	Ivan Perasovic	6 ft 8 in (2.03 m)	220 lb (100 kg)	Fr	KK Split	Split, Croatia
F	9	Janusz Ratowski	6 ft 11 in (2.11 m)	235 lb (107 kg)	RS So	Stetson	Chotomów, Poland
F	11	Augusto Cassia	6 ft 10 in (2.08 m)	230 lb (104 kg)	Sr	Ole Miss	Salvador, BA, Brazil
G	12	Kaleb Jackson	6 ft 7 in (2.01 m)	190 lb (86 kg)	Fr	Kingdom Collegiate Academy	Duncanville, Texas
G/F	15	Ryan Jackson Jr.	6 ft 6 in (1.98 m)	215 lb (98 kg)	Jr	William & Mary	Mesa, Arizona
F	18	Isaiah Ward	6 ft 6 in (1.98 m)	200 lb (91 kg)	Fr	William J. Brennan HS	San Antonio, Texas
G	21	Jace Whiting	6 ft 3 in (1.91 m)	195 lb (88 kg)	RS Sr	Weber State	Burley, Idaho
F	23	Youssouf Traore	6 ft 10 in (2.08 m)	215 lb (98 kg)	Fr	Casademont Zaragoza	Bamako, Mali
F	24	Reid Cason	6 ft 10 in (2.08 m)	235 lb (107 kg)	Jr	East Carolina	Kingston, Oklahoma

Head coach

- Joe Golding (Abilene Christian)

Assistant coach(es)

- Jeremy Cox (Colorado Mesa)
- Joseph Jones (Texas A&M)
- Dan Russell (Black Hills State)
- Patrice Days (LSU New Orleans)
- Drew Lakey (Old Dominion)

Legend

- (C) Team captain
- (S) Suspended
- (I) Ineligible
- (W) Walk-on
- Injured
- Current redshirt

Roster
Last update: 2026-09-14

== Schedule and results ==
Date time, TV	Rank^{#}	Opponent^{#}	Result	Record	High points	High rebounds	High assists	Site (attendance) city, state
Non-conference regular season
November 2, 2026*; 12:00 p.m., YouTube		vs. Northern Kentucky; Field of 68 Opening Day Marathon	L 76–84	0–1	18 – Traore	7 – Traore	5 – Tied	Sanford Pentagon (629); Sioux Falls, SD
November 8, 2026*; 5:00 p.m., MW+		Incarnate Word	W 79–60	1–1	27 – McDaniels	10 – Traore	7 – Miller	Don Haskins Center (3,819); El Paso, TX
November 12, 2026*; 7:00 p.m., MW+		New Mexico State; Battle of I-10	W 60–58	2–1	22 – McDaniels	5 – McDaniels	4 – Moeller	Don Haskins Center (6,180); El Paso, TX
November 15, 2026*; 6:00 p.m., MW+		Florida A&M	W 79–46	3–1	18 – McDaniels	13 – Traore	5 – Tied	Don Haskins Center (3,573); El Paso, TX
November 19, 2026*; 7:00 p.m., ESPN+		at New Mexico State; Battle of I-10						Pan American Center; Las Cruces, NM
November 24, 2026*; 6:30 p.m., TBD		vs. College of Charleston; Cancún Challenge Riviera Division Semifinal						Hard Rock Hotel Riviera Maya; Cancún, QR, Mexico
November 25, 2026*; TBD, TBD		vs. Eastern Michigan/Kennesaw State; Cancún Challenge Riviera Division						Hard Rock Hotel Riviera Maya; Cancún, QR, Mexico
December 1, 2026*; 7:00 p.m., ESPN+		at Colorado						CU Events Center; Boulder, CO
December 5, 2026*; 2:00 p.m., MW+		North Dakota; Cancún Challenge campus-site game						Don Haskins Center; El Paso, TX
December 16, 2026*; 7:00 p.m., MW+		UT Permian Basin						Don Haskins Center; El Paso, TX
December 20, 2026*; 7:00 p.m., MW+		Howard; Sun Bowl Invitational						Don Haskins Center; El Paso, TX
December 21, 2026*; TBD, MW+		Kent State/Omaha; Sun Bowl Invitational						Don Haskins Center; El Paso, TX
December 29, 2026*; 7:00 p.m., MW+		New Mexico Highlands						Don Haskins Center; El Paso, TX
Mountain West regular season
January 2, 2027; 6:00 p.m., FS1		New Mexico						Don Haskins Center; El Paso, TX
January 5, 2027; 7:00 p.m., MW+		Wyoming						Don Haskins Center; El Paso, TX
January 9, 2027; 12:00 p.m., MW+		at Air Force						Clune Arena; Colorado Springs, CO
January 12, 2027; 8:00 p.m., CW		Nevada						Don Haskins Center; El Paso, TX
January 15, 2027; 8:00 p.m., CBSSN		at UNLV						Thomas & Mack Center; Paradise, NV
January 19, 2027; 6:30 p.m., MW+		at Wyoming						Arena-Auditorium; Laramie, WY
January 23, 2027; 7:00 p.m., MW+		UC Davis						Don Haskins Center; El Paso, TX
January 26, 2027; 9:00 p.m., CBSSN		at Nevada						Lawlor Events Center; Reno, NV
January 30, 2027; 7:00 p.m., MW+		San Jose State						Don Haskins Center; El Paso, TX
February 6, 2027; 10:00 p.m., MW+		at Hawaii						Stan Sheriff Center; Honolulu, HI
February 9, 2027; 8:00 p.m., CBSSN		Grand Canyon						Don Haskins Center; El Paso, TX
February 13, 2027; 5:00 p.m., MW+		at UC Davis						University Credit Union Center; Davis, CA
February 17, 2027; 6:00 p.m., CBSSN		UNLV						Don Haskins Center; El Paso, TX
February 20, 2027; 8:30 p.m., CBSSN		at New Mexico						The Pit; Albuquerque, NM
February 23, 2027; 8:00 p.m., CW		at Grand Canyon						Global Credit Union Arena; Phoenix, AZ
February 27, 2027; 7:00 p.m., MW+		Hawaii						Don Haskins Center; El Paso, TX
March 2, 2027; TBD, MW+		at San Jose State						Provident Credit Union Event Center; San Jose, CA
March 6, 2027; 2:00 p.m., MW+		Air Force						Don Haskins Center; El Paso, TX
Mountain West tournament
March 10, 2027; TBD, TBD		vs. TBD						Thomas & Mack Center; Paradise, NV
*Non-conference game. ^{#}Rankings from AP Poll. (#) Tournament seedings in parentheses. All times are in Mountain Time.
