= 2026–27 UNLV Runnin' Rebels basketball team =

American college basketball season

2026–27 UNLV Runnin' Rebels basketball
- Conference: Mountain West Conference
- Record: 3–1 (0–0 MW)
- Head coach: Josh Pastner (2nd season)
- Associate head coach: Scott Garson (2nd season)
- Assistant coaches: Anthony Wilkins (2nd season); Justin Hawkins (2nd season)
- Home arena: Thomas & Mack Center (Capacity: 17,923)

2026–27 Mountain West Conference men's basketball standings
	Conf.				Overall
Team	W		L	PCT	W		L	PCT
Grand Canyon	0	–	0	–	4	–	0	1.000
Hawaii	0	–	0	–	3	–	1	.750
New Mexico	0	–	0	–	3	–	1	.750
UC Davis	0	–	0	–	3	–	1	.750
UNLV	0	–	0	–	3	–	1	.750
UTEP	0	–	0	–	3	–	1	.750
Wyoming	0	–	0	–	3	–	1	.750
Air Force	0	–	0	–	3	–	2	.600
Nevada	0	–	0	–	2	–	2	.500
San Jose State	0	–	0	–	2	–	2	.500
† 2027 Mountain West tournament winner As of November 18, 2026; Rankings from AP poll

The 2026–27 UNLV Runnin' Rebels basketball team will represent the University of Nevada, Las Vegas during the 2026–27 NCAA Division I men's basketball season. The Runnin' Rebels, will be led by second-year head coach josh Pastner, playing their home games at the Thomas & Mack Center in Paradise, Nevada as a member of the Mountain West Conference (MW).

== Previous season ==
The Runnin' Rebels finished the 2025–26 season 18–17, 11–9 in Mountain West play to finish tied for seventh (but got eighth place due to losing the tiebreaker to Colorado State) in the conference. As the 8th seed in the Mountain West Tournament they would beat (9th seed Wyoming) 73–70 in the First Round, but would lose to (1st Seed Utah State) 80–60 in the Quarterfinals. As they were not selected to participate in the NCAA Tournament, they were selected and played in the NIT Tournament, at they were played in the Tulsa Regional, where they would beat (4th seed UC Irvine) 75–72 in the First Round, but would lose to (1st seed Tulsa) 77–66 in the Second round, witch would end their season with an overall record of 18–17.

== Offseason ==
=== Departures ===
Name	Number	Pos.	Height	Weight	Year	Hometown	Reason for departure
Dravyn Gibbs-Lawhorn	0	G	6'1"	185	Junior	Lafayette, IN	Transferred to Texas Tech
Ladji Dembele	1	F	6'8"	255	Junior	Newark, NJ	Transferred to Washington State
Kimani Hamilton	2	F	6'8"	225	Senior	Jackson, MS	Transferred to Mississippi State
Howie Fleming Jr.	3	G	6'5"	210	(redshirt) Senior	Louisville, KY	Transferred to TBA
Al Green	7	G	6'3"	185	Senior	Sacramento, CA	Graduated
Mason Abittan	8	G	6'6"	205	Freshman	Las Vegas, NV	Transferred to Weber State
Jacob Bannarbie	10	F	6'9"	235	(redshirt) Sophomore	Anchorage, AK	Transferred to Providence
Walter Brown	22	F	6'5"	210	Senior	Christchurch, New Zealand	Graduated
Naas Cunningham	24	F	6'7"	175	(redshirt) Freshman	West Orange, NJ	Transferred to Jacksonville State
Emmanuel Stephen	34	C	7'0"	230	Sophomore	Lagos, Nigeria	Transferred to Cal State Northridge
Myles Che	77	G	6'3"	190	Junior	Walnut, CA	Transferred to Saint Mary's
Xavier Brumfield		F	6'1"	180	(redshirt) Freshman	New Orleans, LA	Left team

=== Incoming transfers ===
Name	Number	Pos.	Height	Weight	Year	Hometown	Previous college
Dontrez Williams	0	G	6'6"	190	Junior	Sikeston, MO	Lindenwood
Jeremy Foumena	1	C	6'11"	255	(redshirt) Senior	Montreal, QC	UCF
Cam Miles	2	G	6'2"	180	Sophomore	Chicago, IL	Florida State
Terrance Ford Jr.	3	G	6'2"	180	(redshirt) Junior	Chicago, IL	Tulsa
Tyler Harris	8	F	6'8"	210	Senior	Hayward, CA	Vanderbilt
MJ Thomas	10	F	6'8"	226	Junior	Denton, TX	New Orleans
AJ Storr	22	G	6'5"	205	5th	Rockford, IL	Ole Miss
Sebastian Mack	24	G	6'4"	195	Senior	Chicago, IL	Missouri
Moustapha Loum	34	F	6'10"	225	Junior	Dakar, Senegal	Northwestern State

=== 2026 recruiting class ===
College recruiting (2026)
Name	Hometown	School	Height	Weight	Commit date
			N/A	N/A	
Recruit ratings: No ratings found
Overall recruit ranking: Scout: – Rivals: –
Note: In many cases, Scout, Rivals, 247Sports, On3, and ESPN may conflict in their listings of height and weight.; In these cases, the average was taken. ESPN grades are on a 100-point scale.; Sources: "2026 UNLV Basketball Recruiting Commits". Scout.; "Scout.com Team Recruiting Rankings". Scout.; "2026 Team Ranking". Rivals.

== Roster ==
2026–27 UNLV Runnin' Rebels men's basketball team
Players
Coaches

Pos.	#	Name	Height	Weight	Year	Previous school	Hometown
G	0	Dontrez Williams	6 ft 6 in (1.98 m)	190 lb (86 kg)	Jr	Lindenwood	Sikeston, MO
C	1	Jeremy Foumena	6 ft 11 in (2.11 m)	255 lb (116 kg)	GS	UCF	Montreal, Canada
G	2	Cam Miles	6 ft 2 in (1.88 m)	180 lb (82 kg)	So	Florida State	Chicago, IL
G	3	Terrance Ford Jr.	6 ft 2 in (1.88 m)	180 lb (82 kg)	Sr	Tulsa	Chicago, IL
G	5	Kota Suttle Jr.	6 ft 3 in (1.91 m)	195 lb (88 kg)	Fr	SoCal Academy	Atlanta, GA
G	6	Tyrin Jones	6 ft 10 in (2.08 m)	200 lb (91 kg)	So	Layton Christian Academy	Las Vegas, NV
F	8	Tyler Harris	6 ft 8 in (2.03 m)	210 lb (95 kg)	Sr	Vanderbilt	Hayward, CA
F	9	Jackson Kiss	6 ft 8 in (2.03 m)	235 lb (107 kg)	Fr	Utah Prep Academy	Auckland, New Zealand
F	10	MJ Thomas	6 ft 8 in (2.03 m)	226 lb (103 kg)	Jr	LSU New Orleans	Denton, TX
G	12	Isaac Williamson	6 ft 1 in (1.85 m)	200 lb (91 kg)	So	Eastvale Roosevelt HS	Moreno Valley, CA
G	13	Jalen Cunningham	6 ft 2 in (1.88 m)	185 lb (84 kg)	Sr	Cabrillo College	Las Vegas, NV
G	22	AJ Storr (I)	6 ft 5 in (1.96 m)	205 lb (93 kg)	Sr	Ole Miss	Rockford, IL
G	24	Sebastian Mack	6 ft 4 in (1.93 m)	195 lb (88 kg)	Sr	Missouri	Chicago, IL
F	34	Moustapha Loum	6 ft 10 in (2.08 m)	225 lb (102 kg)	Jr	Northwestern State	Dakar, Senegal

Head coach

- Josh Pastner (Arizona)

Assistant coach(es)

- Scott Garson (UC Santa Barbara)
- Anthony Wilkins (Kent State)
- Justin Hawkins (UNLV)

Legend

- (C) Team captain
- (S) Suspended
- (I) Ineligible
- (W) Walk-on
- Injured
- Current redshirt

Roster
Last update: August 14, 2026

== Schedule and results ==
Date time, TV	Rank^{#}	Opponent^{#}	Result	Record	High points	High rebounds	High assists	Site (attendance) city, state
Exhibition
October 7, 2026*; 7:00 p.m., MW+		Utah	L 69–79	–	25 – Mack	10 – Thomas	5 – Kiss	Thomas & Mack Center (3,175); Paradise, Nevada
October 24, 2026*; 1:00 p.m., MW+		No. 25 BYU	L 77–89	–	26 – Mack	9 – Tied	4 – Miles	Thomas & Mack Center (5,319); Paradise, Nevada
October 29, 2026*; 7:00 p.m., MW+		Missouri	W 90–81	–	21 – Jones	9 – Miles	10 – Miles	Thomas & Mack Center (4,505); Paradise, Nevada
Non-Conference regular season
November 3, 2026*; 7:00 p.m., MW+		Northern Arizona	W 89–77	1–0	31 – Mack	11 – Foumena	4 – Miles	Thomas & Mack Center (5,109); Paradise, Nevada
November 7, 2026*; 1:00 p.m., MW+		Samford	W 88–79	2–0	20 – Miles	6 – Kiss	2 – Tied	Thomas & Mack Center (4,122); Paradise, Nevada
November 13, 2026*; 6:00 p.m., CBSSN		Stanford	W 76–68	3–0	17 – Miles	6 – Jones	5 – Mack	Thomas & Mack Center (5,776); Paradise, Nevada
November 17, 2026*; 6:30 p.m., ESPN		vs. No. 11 Kansas; Players Era 8 First Round	L 77–102	3–1	22 – D. Williams	6 – D. Williams	4 – C. Miles	Michelob Ultra Arena; Las Vegas, Nevada
November 18, 2026*; 7:00 p.m., TBA		vs. Auburn; Players Era 8 Consolation 2nd Round						Michelob Ultra Arena; Las Vegas, Nevada
November 19, 2026*; TBA, TBA		vs. Rutgers or Notre Dame; Players Era 8 5th or 7th Place Game						Michelob Ultra Arena; Las Vegas, Nevada
November 23, 2026*; 7:00 p.m., MW+		Eastern Washington						Thomas & Mack Center; Paradise, Nevada
November 28, 2026*; 12:00 p.m., MW+		UT Rio Grande Valley						Thomas & Mack Center; Paradise, Nevada
December 2, 2026*; 7:00 p.m., ESPN+		at San Francisco						Sobrato Center; San Francisco, California
December 5, 2026*; 1:30 p.m., USA		at San Diego State						Viejas Arena; San Diego, California
December 12, 2026*; 12:45 p.m., The CW		vs. Washington State; Jack Jones Classic						Lee's Family Forum; Henderson, Nevada
December 19, 2026*; 12:30 p.m., The CW		vs. SMU; Hall of Fame Phoenix						Mortgage Matchup Center; Phoenix, Arizona
December 22, 2026*; 7:00 p.m., MW+		Cal Poly						Thomas & Mack Center; Paradise, Nevada
December 29, 2026*; 4:00 p.m., MW+		Westminster						Thomas & Mack Center; Paradise, Nevada
January 2, 2027*; 5:00 p.m., MW+		North Dakota						Thomas & Mack Center; Paradise, Nevada
Mountain West regular season
January 5, 2027; 7:30 p.m., FS1		at Grand Canyon						Global Credit Union Arena; Phoenix, Arizona
January 9, 2027; TBA, MW+		at San Jose State						Provident Credit Union Event Center; San Jose, California
January 12, 2027; 7:30 p.m., CBSSN		New Mexico						Thomas & Mack Center; Paradise, Nevada
January 15, 2027; 7:00 p.m., CBSSN		UTEP						Thomas & Mack Center; Paradise, Nevada
January 19, 2027; 6:00 p.m., MW+		at UC Davis						University Credit Union Center; Davis, California
January 23, 2027; 7:00 p.m., FS1		Hawaii						Thomas & Mack Center; Paradise, Nevada
January 26, 2027; 6:00 p.m., CBSSN		at Wyoming						Arena-Auditorium; Laramie, Wyoming
January 30, 2027; 7:00 p.m., The CW		Nevada						Thomas & Mack Center; Paradise, Nevada
February 2, 2027; 5:30 p.m., MW+		at Air Force						Clune Arena; Colorado Springs, Colorado
February 6, 2027; 3:00 p.m., FS1		San Jose State						Thomas & Mack Center; Paradise, Nevada
February 10, 2027; 8:00 p.m., CBSSN		Wyoming						Thomas & Mack Center; Paradise, Nevada
February 13, 2027; 3:00 p.m., CBSSN		at New Mexico						The Pit; Albuquerque, New Mexico
February 17, 2027; 5:00 p.m., CBSSN		at UTEP						Don Haskins Center; El Paso, Texas
February 20, 2027; 5:00 p.m., CBSSN		Grand Canyon						Thomas & Mack Center; Paradise, Nevada
February 24, 2027; 7:30 p.m., FS1		Air Force						Thomas & Mack Center; Paradise, Nevada
February 27, 2027; 7:30 p.m., CBSSN		at Nevada						Lawlor Events Center; Reno, Nevada
March 2, 2027; 7:00 p.m., MW+		UC Davis; Senior Day or Night						Thomas & Mack Center; Paradise, Nevada
March 6, 2027; 9:00 p.m., MW+		at Hawaii						Stan Sheriff Center; Honolulu, Hawaii
Mountain West Tournament
March 10, 2027 - March 13, 2027; TBD, CBSSN or CBS		vs. TBD; Mountain West Tournament						Thomas & Mack Center; Paradise, Nevada
*Non-conference game. ^{#}Rankings from AP Poll. (#) Tournament seedings in parentheses. All times are in Pacific Time.
