= Bethel University =

Bethel University may refer to:

- Bethel University (Indiana)
- Bethel University (Minnesota)
- Bethel University (Tennessee)
- Bethel University (Zambia)
- Former name of Shorter College (Arkansas)

== See also ==
- Bethel College
