= 2026–27 Wyoming Cowboys basketball team =

American college basketball season

2026–27 Wyoming Cowboys basketball
- Conference: Mountain West Conference
- Record: 5–1 (0–0 MW)
- Head coach: Sundance Wicks (3rd season)
- Assistant coaches: Will Martin (3rd season); Chris McMillian (2nd season); Nic Reynolds (3rd season); Chris Thomas (2nd season); Nick Whitmore (4th season)
- Home arena: Arena-Auditorium (Capacity: 11,612)

2026–27 Mountain West Conference men's basketball standings
	Conf.				Overall
Team	W		L	PCT	W		L	PCT
Grand Canyon	0	–	0	–	4	–	0	1.000
UTEP	0	–	0	–	4	–	1	.800
Wyoming	0	–	0	–	4	–	1	.800
Hawaii	0	–	0	–	3	–	2	.600
Nevada	0	–	0	–	3	–	2	.600
New Mexico	0	–	0	–	3	–	2	.600
San Jose State	0	–	0	–	3	–	2	.600
UC Davis	0	–	0	–	3	–	2	.600
Air Force	0	–	0	–	3	–	3	.500
UNLV	0	–	0	–	3	–	3	.500
† 2027 Mountain West tournament winner As of November 22, 2026; Rankings from AP poll

The 2026–27 Wyoming Cowboys basketball team will represent the University of Wyoming during the 2026–27 NCAA Division I men's basketball season. The Cowboys will be led by third-year head coach Sundance Wicks and will play their home games at the Arena-Auditorium in Laramie, Wyoming as a member of the Mountain West Conference.

== Previous season ==
Wyoming finished the 2025-26 season 18–15, 9–11 in the Mountain West Conference to finish ninth in the conference. As the 9-seed in the Mountain West Tournament, the Cowboys were defeated by 8-seed UNLV in the First round. Wyoming was invited to participate in the NIT in the Tulsa Region. The Cowboys travelled to Wichita, KS to face Wichita State in the First round, but were defeated 70–74 to end their season.

== Offseason ==
=== Departures ===
Wyoming Cowboys departures
Name	Number	Pos.	Height	Weight	Year	Hometown	Reason for departure
Damarion Dennis	1	G	6'1"	166	Sophomore	San Antonio, TX	Transferred to Texas Tech
Leland Walker	5	G	6'6"	181	Senior	Indianapolis, IN	Out of eligibility
Matija Belić	7	F	6'7"	239	Senior	Belgrade, Serbia	Out of eligibility
Kiani Saxon	8	F	6'8"	226	Graduate	Auckland, New Zealand	Out of eligibility
Jared Harris	9	G	6'2"	186	Sophomore	Silsbee, TX	Transferred to Prairie View A&M
Abou Magassa	10	F	6'7"	217	Sophomore	Morsang-sur-Orge, France	Transferred to UNC Asheville
Adam Harakow	13	G/F	6'7"	218	Junior	Edmonton, AB, Canada	Transferred to Western Michigan
Garrett Spielman	14	G/F	6'7"	201	(redshirt) Freshman	Sheridan, WY	Transferred to Michigan Tech
Talan Taylor	32	G	6'4"	158	Freshman	Idaho Falls, ID	Departed program
Simm-Marten Saadi	35	F	6'9"	242	Freshman	Tallinn, Estonia	Transferred to Central Arkansas

=== Incoming transfers ===
Wyoming Cowboys incoming transfers
Name	Number	Pos.	Height	Weight	Year	Hometown	Previous School
Mike Mora	1	F	6'6"	210	Junior	Palo Alto, CA	Cal State Monterey Bay
Renars Sondors	10	F	6'9"	215	Junior	Riga, Latvia	Louisiana-Monroe
Micah Curtis	12	G	6'8"	230	(redshirt) Freshman	St. Louis Park, MN	North Dakota
Mattia De Martin	15	F	6'8"	205	Sophomore	Vicenza, Italy	Indian Hills CC
Parker Gerrits	22	G	6'2"	190	Junior	Olympia, WA	Washington State
Canin Jefferson	-	F	6'2"	185	Senior	New Orleans, LA	North Alabama

=== 2026 recruiting class ===
College recruiting
Name	Hometown	School	Height	Weight	Commit date
Chris Pohl; PF	Marshfield, WI	Marshfield HS	6 ft 7 in (2.01 m)	215 lb (98 kg)	Nov 12, 2025
Chris Pohl; PF	Recruit ratings: Rivals: 247Sports: ESPN: (NR)				
Madden Smiley; CG	Windsor, CO	Windsor HS	6 ft 4 in (1.93 m)	180 lb (82 kg)	Sep 23, 2025
Madden Smiley; CG	Recruit ratings: Rivals: 247Sports: ESPN: (NR)				
Linus Ruf; C	Speyer, Germany	Artland Dragons	6 ft 11 in (2.11 m)	230 lb (100 kg)	Apr 27, 2026
Linus Ruf; C	Recruit ratings: (NR)				
Overall recruit ranking: Scout: – Rivals: –
Note: In many cases, Scout, Rivals, 247Sports, On3, and ESPN may conflict in their listings of height and weight.; In these cases, the average was taken. ESPN grades are on a 100-point scale.; Sources: "2026 Wyoming Basketball Recruiting Commits". Scout.; "Scout.com Team Recruiting Rankings". Scout.; "2026 Team Ranking". Rivals.

== Roster ==
2026–27 Wyoming Cowboys men's basketball team
Players
Coaches

Pos.	#	Name	Height	Weight	Year	Previous school	Hometown
G	0	Uriyah Rojas	6 ft 3 in (1.91 m)	199 lb (90 kg)	Sr	Chaffey College	Rancho Cucamonga, California
F	1	Mike Mora	6 ft 6 in (1.98 m)	225 lb (102 kg)	Jr	Cal State Monterey Bay	Palo Alto, California
G	2	Nasir Meyer	6 ft 7 in (2.01 m)	202 lb (92 kg)	So	New Hampton School	Los Angeles, California
G	3	Khaden Bennett	6 ft 4 in (1.93 m)	207 lb (94 kg)	Sr	Quinnipiac	Mansfield, Texas
G	5	Madden Smiley	6 ft 4 in (1.93 m)	184 lb (83 kg)	Fr	Windsor HS	Windsor, Colorado
G	6	Canin Jefferson	6 ft 2 in (1.88 m)	177 lb (80 kg)	Sr	North Alabama	New Orleans, Louisiana
G	7	Kelan Gruver (W)	6 ft 3 in (1.91 m)	162 lb (73 kg)	Fr	Bonner Springs HS	Bonner Springs, Kansas
F	8	Chris Pohl	6 ft 7 in (2.01 m)	216 lb (98 kg)	Fr	Marshfield HS	Marshfield, Wisconsin
F	10	Renars Sondors	6 ft 9 in (2.06 m)	214 lb (97 kg)	Jr	Louisiana–Monroe	Riga, Latvia
F	11	Gavin Gores	6 ft 10 in (2.08 m)	230 lb (104 kg)	So	Cumberland HS	Cumberland, Wisconsin
F	12	Micah Curtis	6 ft 8 in (2.03 m)	230 lb (104 kg)	RS Fr	North Dakota	St. Louis Park, Minnesota
G	15	Mattia De Martin	6 ft 8 in (2.03 m)	199 lb (90 kg)	So	Indian Hills CC	Vicenza, Italy
C	19	Linus Ruf	6 ft 11 in (2.11 m)	235 lb (107 kg)	Fr	Artland Dragons	Speyer, Germany
G	22	Parker Gerrits	6 ft 2 in (1.88 m)	186 lb (84 kg)	Jr	Washington State	Olympia, Washington
C	45	Neil Summers	6 ft 9 in (2.06 m)	282 lb (128 kg)	RS Fr	Laramie HS	Laramie, Wyoming

Head coach

- Sundance Wicks (Northern State)

Assistant coach(es)

- Will Martin (Kentucky)
- Chris McMillian (Wyoming)
- Nic Reynolds (Columbia College)
- Chris Thomas (Dayton)
- Nick Whitmore (Boise State)

Legend

- (C) Team captain
- (S) Suspended
- (I) Ineligible
- (W) Walk-on
- Injured
- Current redshirt

Roster

== Schedule and results ==
Date time, TV	Rank^{#}	Opponent^{#}	Result	Record	High points	High rebounds	High assists	Site (attendance) city, state
Exhibition
October 11, 2026*; 2:00 p.m.		vs. Northern Colorado	W 94–68		–	–	–	Pronghorn Center; Gillette, WY
October 17, 2026*; 2:00 p.m.		vs. TCU	L 76–89		24 – Meyer	4 – Tied	4 – Bennett	Chaparral Center; Midland, TX
October 24, 2026*; 12:00 p.m., MW+		College of Idaho	W 76–61		–	–	–	Arena-Auditorium; Laramie, WY
Non-conference regular season
November 3, 2026*; 6:30 p.m., MW+		Regis	W 95–48	1–0	15 – Bennett	8 – Smiley	4 – Jefferson	Arena-Auditorium (3,099); Laramie, WY
November 6, 2026*; 6:30 p.m., MW+		Idaho State	W 93–62	2–0	18 – Meyer	9 – Meyer	5 – Tied (2)	Arena-Auditorium (3,393); Laramie, WY
November 10, 2026*; 5:00 p.m., ACCNX		at North Carolina	L 63–76	2–1	17 – Meyer	8 – Mora	4 – Tied (2)	Dean E. Smith Center (16,805); Chapel Hill, NC
November 14, 2026*; 1:00 p.m., ESPN+		at Denver	W 76–53	3–1	15 – Gores	8 – Rojas	5 – Bennett	Hamilton Gymnasium (1,803); Denver, CO
November 17, 2026*; 6:30 p.m., MW+		Sam Houston	W 81–79	4–1	22 – Meyer	11 – Meyer	5 – Meyer	Arena-Auditorium (3,021); Laramie, WY
November 22, 2026*; 12:00 p.m., TBD		vs. Duquesne; Sunshine Slam	W 79–61	5–1	–	–	–	Ocean Center; Daytona Beach, FL
November 24, 2026*; 3:30 p.m., TBD		vs. Kent State; Sunshine Slam						Ocean Center; Daytona Beach, FL
November 29, 2026*; 1:00 p.m., MW+		Eastern Washington						Arena-Auditorium; Laramie, WY
December 2, 2026*; 7:00 p.m., MW+		Austin Peay						Arena-Auditorium; Laramie, WY
December 5, 2026*; 2:00 p.m., MW+		San Diego						Arena-Auditorium; Laramie, WY
December 11, 2026*; 6:00 p.m., The CW		at Colorado State; Border War						Moby Arena; Fort Collins, CO
December 14, 2026*; 6:30 p.m., MW+		Winthrop						Arena-Auditorium; Laramie, WY
December 19, 2026*; 6:00 p.m., ESPN+		at Portland						Chiles Center; Portland, OR
December 22, 2026*; 4:00 p.m., ESPN+		at Loyola Marymount						Gersten Pavilion; Los Angeles, CA
Mountain West regular season
January 2, 2027; 6:15 p.m., CW		Nevada						Arena-Auditorium; Laramie, WY
January 5, 2027; 7:00 p.m., MW+		at UTEP						Don Haskins Center; El Paso, TX
January 9, 2027; 2:30 p.m., CW		at Grand Canyon						Global Credit Union Arena; Phoenix, AZ
January 12, 2027; 6:30 p.m., MW+		UC Davis						Arena-Auditorium; Laramie, WY
January 16, 2027; TBD, MW+		at Hawaii						Stan Sheriff Center; Honolulu, HI
January 19, 2027; 6:30 p.m., MW+		UTEP						Arena-Auditorium; Laramie, WY
January 22, 2027; 9:00 p.m., FS1		at Air Force						Clune Arena; Colorado Springs, CO
January 26, 2027; 7:00 p.m., CBSSN		UNLV						Arena-Auditorium; Laramie, WY
January 30, 2027; 8:00 p.m., CBSSN		Grand Canyon						Arena-Auditorium; Laramie, WY
February 6, 2027; 2:30 p.m., CW		at Nevada						Lawlor Events Center; Reno, NV
February 10, 2027; 9:00 p.m., CBSSN		at UNLV						Thomas & Mack Center; Paradise, NV
February 13, 2027; 3:30 p.m., CW		Hawaii						Arena-Auditorium; Laramie, WY
February 17, 2027; 9:00 p.m., FS1		New Mexico						Arena-Auditorium; Laramie, WY
February 20, 2027; TBD, MW+		at San Jose State						Provident Credit Union Event Center; San Jose, CA
February 23, 2027; 7:00 p.m., MW+		at UC Davis						University Credit Union Center; Davis, CA
February 27, 2027; 1:00 p.m., MW+		Air Force						Arena-Auditorium; Laramie, WY
March 2, 2027; 8:00 p.m., CBSSN		at New Mexico						The Pit; Albuquerque, NM
March 5, 2027; 9:00 p.m., FS1		San Jose State						Arena-Auditorium; Laramie, WY
Mountain West tournament
March 10, 2027; TBD, TBD		vs. TBD						Thomas & Mack Center; Paradise, NV
*Non-conference game. ^{#}Rankings from AP Poll. (#) Tournament seedings in parentheses. All times are in Mountain Time.
