= 2026–27 Nevada Wolf Pack men's basketball team =

American college basketball season

2026–27 Nevada Wolf Pack men's basketball
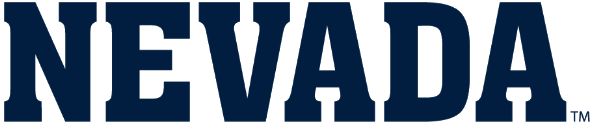
- Conference: Mountain West Conference
- Record: 2–2 (0–0 MW)
- Head coach: Steve Alford (8th season)
- Associate head coach: Craig Neal (8th season)
- Assistant coaches: Bil Duany (8th season); Lo Leath (2nd season); Michael Furlong (5th season); Jarod Lucas (1st season)
- Home arena: Lawlor Events Center (Capacity: 12,000)

2026–27 Mountain West Conference men's basketball standings
	Conf.				Overall
Team	W		L	PCT	W		L	PCT
Grand Canyon	0	–	0	–	4	–	0	1.000
Wyoming	0	–	0	–	4	–	1	.800
New Mexico	0	–	0	–	3	–	1	.750
UTEP	0	–	0	–	3	–	1	.750
Air Force	0	–	0	–	3	–	2	.600
Hawaii	0	–	0	–	3	–	2	.600
Nevada	0	–	0	–	3	–	2	.600
San Jose State	0	–	0	–	3	–	2	.600
UC Davis	0	–	0	–	3	–	2	.600
UNLV	0	–	0	–	3	–	2	.600
† 2027 Mountain West tournament winner As of November 19, 2026; Rankings from AP poll

The 2026–27 Nevada Wolf Pack men's basketball team will represent the University of Nevada, Reno during the 2026–27 NCAA Division I men's basketball season. The Wolf Pack will be led by eighth-year head coach Steve Alford and will play their home games at the Lawlor Events Center in Reno, Nevada as a member of the Mountain West Conference. This is expected to mark Nevada's final season playing at the Lawlor Events Center before moving to the new Grand Sierra Resort Arena for the 2027–28 season.

On September 24, 2026, the school announced that Steve Alford's would retire following the completion of the 2026-27 season after eight years as head coach of Nevada and thirty-three years of coaching.

== Previous season ==
Nevada finished the 2025-26 season 24–13, 12–8 in the Mountain West Conference to finish tied for fifth in the conference. As the 5-seed in the Mountain West Tournament the Wolf Pack defeated 12-seed Air Force in the First round and 4-seed Grand Canyon before falling to 1-seed Utah State in the Semifinals 66-79. Nevada was invited to participate in the NIT as the 2-seed in the Auburn Region. The Wolf Pack defeated Murray State in the First round, before defeating Liberty to advance to the Quarterfinals. The Wolf Pack fell to 1-seed Auburn 69-75 in the Quarterfinals to end their season.

== Offseason ==
=== Departures ===
Nevada Wolf Pack departures
Name	Number	Pos.	Height	Weight	Year	Hometown	Reason for departure
Chuck Bailey III	0	G	6'4"	218	Junior	Detroit, MI	Transferred to Delaware
Tyler Rolison	3	G	6'0"	190	Junior	Los Angeles, CA	Departed program
Corey Camper Jr.	4	G	6'5"	181	Graduate	Little Rock, AR	Out of eligibility
Amire Robinson	5	G	6'3"	198	(redshirt) Sophomore	Akron, OH	Departed program
Kaleb Lowery	6	F	6'8"	217	Graduate	San Diego, CA	Out of eligibility
Jeriah Coleman	10	C	7'1"	231	Graduate	Anchorage, AK	Out of eligibility
Tayshawn Comer	12	G	6'1"	204	Senior	Indianapolis, IN	Transferred to Washington
Joel Armotrading	21	C	6'10"	244	Graduate	London, England	Out of eligibility
Christopher Baudreau	24	F	6'9"	205	Freshman	Las Vegas, NV	Departed program
Ethan Croley	50	F	6'9"	247	Freshman	San Antonio, TX	Departed program

=== Incoming transfers ===
Nevada Wolf Pack incoming transfers
Name	Number	Pos.	Height	Weight	Year	Hometown	Previous School
Simon Majok	0	C	7'1"	210	Sophomore	Akak, South Sudan	Memphis
Styles Phipps	1	C	6'2"	185	Junior	Phoenix, AZ	Pepperdine
TJ Coulter	6	G	6'4"	-	Junior	Sparks, NV	Laramie County CC
Keyon Kensie Jr.	8	G	6'8"	200	Senior	Los Angeles, CA	Portland State
Peter Bandelj	9	G	6'4"	210	Junior	Ljubljana, Slovenia	Cal Poly
Cedric Lath	34	C	6'10"	265	(redshirt) Senior	Abidjan, Ivory Coast	Houston

=== 2026 recruiting class ===
College recruiting
Name	Hometown	School	Height	Weight	Commit date
Hudson Lucas; C	Dallas, TX	Parish Episcopal School	6 ft 8 in (2.03 m)	200 lb (91 kg)	Sep 22, 2025
Hudson Lucas; C	Recruit ratings: On3: (NR)				
SJ Madison; SG	Redondo Beach, CA	Redondo Union HS	6 ft 4 in (1.93 m)	170 lb (77 kg)	Oct 3, 2025
SJ Madison; SG	Recruit ratings: 247Sports: On3: ESPN: (81)				
Kade Snyder; PF	Reno, NV	Bishop Manogue HS	6 ft 8 in (2.03 m)	225 lb (102 kg)	Oct 9, 2025
Kade Snyder; PF	Recruit ratings: (NR)				
Overall recruit ranking: Scout: – Rivals: –
Note: In many cases, Scout, Rivals, 247Sports, On3, and ESPN may conflict in their listings of height and weight.; In these cases, the average was taken. ESPN grades are on a 100-point scale.; Sources: "2026 Nevada Basketball Recruiting Commits". Scout.; "Scout.com Team Recruiting Rankings". Scout.; "2026 Team Ranking". Rivals.

== Roster ==
2026–27 Nevada Wolf Pack men's basketball team
Players
Coaches

Pos.	#	Name	Height	Weight	Year	Previous school	Hometown
C	0	Simon Majok	7 ft 1 in (2.16 m)	—	So	Memphis	Akak, South Sudan
G	1	Styles Phipps	6 ft 2 in (1.88 m)	—	Jr	Pepperdine	Phoenix, Arizona
G	2	Myles Walker	5 ft 10 in (1.78 m)	—	So	Eleanor Roosevelt HS	Riverside, California
F	3	Elijah Price	6 ft 9 in (2.06 m)	—	RS Jr	Fresno State	Long Beach, California
G	6	TJ Coulter	6 ft 4 in (1.93 m)	—	Jr	Laramie County CC	Sparks, Nevada
G	7	Vaughn Weems	6 ft 5 in (1.96 m)	—	Sr	North Idaho College	Federal Way, Washington
G	8	Keyon Kensie Jr.	6 ft 8 in (2.03 m)	—	Sr	Portland State	Los Angeles, California
G	9	Peter Bandelj	6 ft 4 in (1.93 m)	—	Jr	Cal Poly	Ljubljana, Slovenia
F	11	Hudson Lucas	6 ft 9 in (2.06 m)	—	Fr	Parish Episcopal School	Dallas, Texas
F	13	Kade Snyder	6 ft 8 in (2.03 m)	—	Fr	Bishop Manogue HS	Reno, Nevada
G	15	SJ Madison	6 ft 5 in (1.96 m)	—	Fr	Redondo Union HS	Los Angeles, California
G	17	Peyton White	6 ft 6 in (1.98 m)	—	So	Crespi Carmelite HS	Thousand Oaks, California
C	34	Cedric Lath	6 ft 10 in (2.08 m)	—	RS Sr	Houston	Abidjan, Ivory Coast
G	35	John Mattingly	6 ft 0 in (1.83 m)	—	Fr	Central HS	Phoenix, Arizona

Head coach

- Steve Alford (Indiana)

Assistant coach(es)

- Craig Neal (Georgia Tech)
- Bil Duany (Indiana)
- Lo Leath (Sacramento State)
- Michael Furlong (Hillsdale)
- Jarod Lucas (Nevada)

Legend

- (C) Team captain
- (S) Suspended
- (I) Ineligible
- (W) Walk-on
- Injured
- Current redshirt

Roster

== Schedule and results ==
Date time, TV	Rank^{#}	Opponent^{#}	Result	Record	High points	High rebounds	High assists	Site (attendance) city, state
Exhibition
October 17, 2026*; 1:00 p.m., MW+		Utah	W 71–61		19 – Coulter	6 – Kensie Jr.	6 – Phipps	Lawlor Events Center (2,801); Reno, NV
October 25, 2026*; 1:30 p.m., MW+		Portland State	W 77–71		21 – Price	7 – Weems	3 – Phipps	Lawlor Events Center; Reno, NV
Non-conference regular season
November 2, 2026*; 7:00 p.m., MW+		Robert Morris	W 86–49	1–0	19 – Price	8 – Phipps	5 – Phipps	Lawlor Events Center (7,062); Reno, NV
November 8, 2026*; 1:30 p.m., N/A		vs. Saint Mary's; Lake Tahoe Classic	W 96–95 ^{OT}	2–0	33 – Weems	11 – Price	6 – Bandelj	Tahoe Blue Event Center (3,323); Stateline, NV
November 11, 2026*; 6:00 p.m., ESPN+		at UC Santa Barbara	L 63–76	2–1	20 – Phipps	6 – Tied	4 – Price	The Thunderdome (2,297); Isla Vista, CA
November 14, 2026*; 7:00 p.m., MW+		Utah Valley	L 71–73	2–2	18 – Phipps	10 – White	6 – Phipps	Lawlor Events Center (7,358); Reno, NV
November 18, 2026*; 7:00 p.m., MW+		Idaho	W 91–74	3–2	21 – Price	8 – Price	6 – Weems	Lawlor Events Center (7,013); Reno, NV
November 23, 2026*; 1:30 p.m., FloSports		vs. San Francisco; Acrisure Series Pod 3						Acrisure Arena; Thousand Palms, CA
November 24, 2026*; 4:00 p.m.		vs. Santa Clara; Acrisure Series Pod 3						Acrisure Arena; Thousand Palms, CA
November 28, 2026*; 2:00 p.m., MW+		Cal Poly Humboldt						Lawlor Events Center; Reno, NV
December 2, 2026*; 7:00 p.m., MW+		Pacific						Lawlor Events Center; Reno, NV
December 9, 2026*; 7:00 p.m., MW+		Loyola Marymount						Lawlor Events Center; Reno, NV
December 12, 2026*; 7:00 p.m., MW+		Sam Houston						Lawlor Events Center; Reno, NV
December 18, 2026*; 1:30 p.m., TBD		vs. Colorado State; Texas Legends College Classic						Comerica Center; Frisco, TX
December 20, 2026*; 5:30 p.m., TBD		Loyola Chicago; Texas Legends College Classic						Comerica Center; Frisco, TX
December 29, 2026*; 5:00 p.m., MW+		South Dakota State						Lawlor Events Center; Reno, NV
Mountain West regular season
January 2, 2027; 5:15 p.m., CW		at Wyoming						Arena-Auditorium; Laramie, WY
January 5, 2027; 7:00 p.m., CBSSN		at New Mexico						The Pit; Albuquerque, NM
January 8, 2027; 6:00 p.m., FS1		Hawaii						Lawlor Events Center; Reno, NV
January 12, 2027; 7:00 p.m., CW		at UTEP						Don Haskins Center; El Paso, TX
January 16, 2027; 7:00 p.m., FS1		Grand Canyon						Lawlor Events Center; Reno, NV
January 19, 2027; 7:00 p.m., MW+		Air Force						Lawlor Events Center; Reno, NV
January 23, 2027; TBD, MW+		at San Jose State						Provident Credit Union Event Center; San Jose, CA
January 26, 2027; 8:00 p.m., CBSSN		UTEP						Lawlor Events Center; Reno, NV
January 30, 2027; 7:00 p.m., CW		at UNLV; Rivalry						Thomas & Mack Center; Paradise, NV
February 3, 2027; 7:30 p.m., FS1		at UC Davis						University Credit Union Center; Davis, CA
February 6, 2027; 1:30 p.m., CW		Wyoming						Lawlor Events Center; Reno, NV
February 13, 2027; 1:00 p.m., FS1		at Grand Canyon						Global Credit Union Arena; Phoenix, AZ
February 16, 2027; 7:00 p.m., MW+		UC Davis						Lawlor Events Center; Reno, NV
March 6, 2027; 5:30 p.m., CW		at Hawaii						Stan Sheriff Center; Honolulu, HI
February 23, 2027; 7:00 p.m., MW+		San Jose State						Lawlor Events Center; Reno, NV
February 27, 2027; 7:30 p.m., CBSSN		UNLV; Rivalry						Lawlor Events Center; Reno, NV
March 2, 2027; 5:30 p.m., MW+		at Air Force						Clune Arena; USAF Academy, CO
March 5, 2027; 6:00 p.m., CBSSN		New Mexico						Lawlor Events Center; Reno, NV
Mountain West tournament
March 10, 2027; TBD, TBD		vs. TBD						Thomas & Mack Center; Paradise, NV
*Non-conference game. ^{#}Rankings from AP Poll. (#) Tournament seedings in parentheses. All times are in Pacific Time.
