= 2026–27 Kennesaw State Owls men's basketball team =

American college basketball season

2026–27 Kennesaw State Owls men's basketball
- Conference: Conference USA
- Record: 4–1 (0–0 CUSA)
- Head coach: Antoine Pettway (4th season)
- Assistant coaches: Willie Watson; Donovan Kates; Philip Pearson; Perkins Carden; Jamie Baker
- Home arena: Convocation Center

2026–27 Conference USA men's basketball standings
	Conf.				Overall
Team	W		L	PCT	W		L	PCT
Kennesaw State	0	–	0	–	4	–	0	1.000
Missouri State	0	–	0	–	4	–	0	1.000
FIU	0	–	0	–	3	–	0	1.000
Middle Tennessee	0	–	0	–	3	–	1	.750
Liberty	0	–	0	–	2	–	1	.667
Delaware	0	–	0	–	3	–	2	.600
Western Kentucky	0	–	0	–	3	–	2	.600
Jacksonville State	0	–	0	–	2	–	2	.500
Sam Houston	0	–	0	–	2	–	2	.500
New Mexico State	0	–	0	–	1	–	3	.250
† 2027 CUSA tournament winner As of November 18, 2026; Rankings from AP poll

The 2026–27 Kennesaw State Owls men's basketball team will represent Kennesaw State University in the 2026–27 NCAA Division I men's basketball season. The Owls, led by fourth-year head coach Antoine Pettway, will play their home games at the KSU Convocation Center in Kennesaw, Georgia as members of Conference USA (C-USA).

== Previous season ==
The Owls finished the 2025–26 season 21–14, 10–10 in C-USA play, to finish in a tie for fourth place. As the No. 6 seed in the C-USA tournament, they defeated Western Kentucky, Sam Houston, and Louisiana Tech to win their first C-USA tournament championship. As the conference's automatic qualifier for the NCAA tournament, Kennesaw State received a No. 14 seed and lost to No. 3 seed Gonzaga in the first round.

== Roster ==
2026–27 Kennesaw State Owls men's basketball team
Players
Coaches

Pos.	#	Name	Height	Weight	Year	Hometown
G	0	Jacoby Hill	6 ft 5 in (1.96 m)	200 lb (91 kg)	So	Phenix City, AL
G	1	CJ Beaumont	6 ft 8 in (2.03 m)	224 lb (102 kg)	Sr	West Palm Beach, FL
F	2	Trey Simpson	6 ft 8 in (2.03 m)	212 lb (96 kg)	So	Evergreen, AL
G	3	Antwane Daniels	6 ft 5 in (1.96 m)	193 lb (88 kg)	Fr	Auburn, AL
G	4	Kaden Rickard	6 ft 6 in (1.98 m)	211 lb (96 kg)	So	Madison, AL
F	5	Avery Thomas II	6 ft 8 in (2.03 m)	213 lb (97 kg)	Jr	Jackson, MS
F	7	Levi Ball	6 ft 8 in (2.03 m)	203 lb (92 kg)	Fr	Columbia, SC
F	10	Keriawn Berry	6 ft 5 in (1.96 m)	208 lb (94 kg)	Fr	Louisville, KY
G	11	Zyree Brown	5 ft 10 in (1.78 m)	160 lb (73 kg)	Fr	Austell, GA
F	12	Anthony Enoh	6 ft 7 in (2.01 m)	224 lb (102 kg)	Sr	Uyo, Nigeria
F	13	Kyler Theophile	6 ft 6 in (1.98 m)	180 lb (82 kg)	Fr	Coral Springs, FL
F	23	Amir Taylor	6 ft 9 in (2.06 m)	250 lb (113 kg)	So	Pittsburgh, PA
G	24	Brendan Tousignaut	6 ft 5 in (1.96 m)	185 lb (84 kg)	So	Canton, GA
F	30	Dozie Onyirimba	6 ft 3 in (1.91 m)	196 lb (89 kg)	Jr	Powder Springs, GA
F	32	Tobiaz Tolbert	6 ft 9 in (2.06 m)	225 lb (102 kg)	Fr	Columbus, GA
G	55	Kris Parker	6 ft 9 in (2.06 m)	207 lb (94 kg)	Sr	Tallahassee, FL

Head coach

- Antoine Pettway (Alabama)

Assistant coach(es)

- Willie Watson (Alabama)
- Donovan Kates (Manhattan)
- Philip Pearson (Alabama)
- Perkins Carden (Alabama)
- Jamie Baker (Alabama)

Legend

- (C) Team captain
- (S) Suspended
- (I) Ineligible
- (W) Walk-on
- Injured
- Current redshirt

Roster

== Schedule and results ==
Date time, TV	Rank^{#}	Opponent^{#}	Result	Record	High points	High rebounds	High assists	Site (attendance) city, state
Exhibition
October 11, 2026*; 1:00 p.m.		Mercer	W 88–73	–	–	–	–	Convocation Center; Kennesaw, GA
October 25, 2026*; 2:00 p.m.		at West Georgia	W 85–81	–	19 – Thomas II	7 – Ball	4 – Parker	The Coliseum (947); Carrollton, GA
Non-conference regular season
November 2, 2026*; 7:00 p.m., ESPN+		Midway	W 116–57	1–0	18 – Theophile	9 – Beaumont	7 – Brown	Convocation Center (1,225); Kennesaw, GA
November 6, 2026*; 7:00 p.m., ESPN+		Austin Peay	W 71–69	2–0	14 – Parker	10 – Thomas II	3 – Tied	Convocation Center (1,312); Kennesaw, GA
November 10, 2026*; 7:00 p.m., ESPN+		Winthrop	W 88–79	3–0	19 – Tied	9 – Taylor	5 – Rickard	Convocation Center (1,353); Kennesaw, GA
November 12, 2026*; 7:00 p.m., ESPN+		LaGrange	W 107–54	4–0	16 – Simpson	10 – Simpson	5 – Brown	Convocation Center (1,277); Kennesaw, GA
November 17, 2026*; 7:30 p.m., SECN+		at No. 16 Alabama	L 91–109	4–1	37 – Thomas II	10 – Theophile	7 – Hill	Coleman Coliseum (10,971); Tuscaloosa, AL
November 20, 2026*; 7:00 p.m., ESPN+		Southeastern Louisiana; Cancún Challenge campus site game						Convocation Center; Kennesaw, GA
November 24, 2026*; 6:00 p.m.		vs. Eastern Michigan; Cancún Challenge Riviera Division semifinal						Hard Rock Hotel Riviera Maya; Cancún, Mexico
November 25, 2026*; TBD		vs. Charleston/UTEP; Cancún Challenge Riviera Division						Hard Rock Hotel Riviera Maya; Cancún, Mexico
November 30, 2026*; 7:00 p.m., ESPN+		Florida A&M						Convocation Center; Kennesaw, GA
December 5, 2026*; 5:30 p.m., ESPN+		at Austin Peay						F&M Bank Arena; Clarksville, TN
December 9, 2026*; 7:00 p.m., ESPN+		at Georgia State						GSU Convocation Center; Atlanta, GA
December 19, 2026*; 2:00 p.m., ESPN+		at South Florida						Yuengling Center; Tampa, FL
December 22, 2026*; 7:00 p.m., ESPN+		Paine						Convocation Center; Kennesaw, GA
C-USA regular season
December 31, 2026; 6:00 p.m., ESPN2		Western Kentucky						Convocation Center; Kennesaw, GA
January 2, 2027; 2:00 p.m.		Middle Tennessee						Convocation Center; Kennesaw, GA
January 9, 2027; 2:00 p.m.		Jacksonville State						Convocation Center; Kennesaw, GA
January 14, 2027; 7:30 p.m.		at Sam Houston						Bernard Johnson Coliseum; Huntsville, TX
January 16, 2027; 4:00 p.m.		at New Mexico State						Pan American Center; Las Cruces, NM
January 21, 2027; 7:00 p.m.		Delaware						Convocation Center; Kennesaw, GA
January 23, 2027; 6:00 p.m., CBSSN		Liberty						Convocation Center; Kennesaw, GA
January 28, 2027; 8:00 p.m.		at Missouri State						Great Southern Bank Arena; Springfield, MO
January 30, 2027; 2:00 p.m.		at FIU						Ocean Bank Convocation Center; Miami, FL
February 6, 2027; 2:00 p.m., ESPNU		at Jacksonville State						Pete Mathews Coliseum; Jacksonville, AL
February 11, 2027; 7:00 p.m.		New Mexico State						Convocation Center; Kennesaw, GA
February 13, 2027; 2:00 p.m.		Sam Houston						Convocation Center; Kennesaw, GA
February 18, 2027; 8:30 p.m., CBSSN		at Liberty						Liberty Arena; Lynchburg, VA
February 20, 2027; 4:00 p.m.		at Delaware						Bob Carpenter Center; Newark, DE
February 25, 2027; 7:00 p.m.		Missouri State						Convocation Center; Kennesaw, GA
February 27, 2027; 2:00 p.m.		FIU						Convocation Center; Kennesaw, GA
March 4, 2027; 8:00 p.m., CBSSN		at Middle Tennessee						Murphy Center; Murfreesboro, TN
March 6, 2027; 3:00 p.m.		at Western Kentucky						E. A. Diddle Arena; Bowling Green, KY
Conference USA tournament
March 9–13, 2027; TBA		vs. TBD						Propst Arena; Huntsville, AL
*Non-conference game. ^{#}Rankings from AP poll. (#) Tournament seedings in parentheses. All times are in Eastern.
