= Bethel College =

Bethel College can refer to:

- Bethel College (Kansas)
- Bethel College (Kentucky)
- Bethel University (Indiana), called Bethel College until 2019
- Bethel University (Minnesota), called Bethel College until 2004
- Bethel University (Tennessee), called Bethel College until 2009

== See also ==
- Bethel University
- Beth-El College of Nursing, Colorado
