= Georgetown, Indiana =

Georgetown is the name of some places in the U.S. state of Indiana:

- Georgetown, Cass County, Indiana
- Georgetown, Floyd County, Indiana
- Georgetown, Harrison County, Indiana
- Georgetown, Randolph County, Indiana
- Georgetown, St. Joseph County, Indiana
- Georgetown, Washington County, Indiana
