= Evergreen Christian School =

Private high school in Loudoun County, Virginia, United States

Coordinates: 39.0306°N 77.5807°W

Information
- Type: Private, Christian
- Established: 2021
- Head of school: Michael Dewey
- Grades: 9-12
- Enrollment: 174 Students (2024-2025)
- Mascot: Eagles
- Accreditation: Middle States Association of Colleges and Schools
- Website: https://www.evergreenchristianschool.org/

Evergreen Christian School is a private, co-educational Christian school. It is accredited by the Middle States Association. It is also a member of the Virginia Council for Private Education. Evergreen Christian School is located in Leesburg, Virginia.

Evergreen has a 42,000 square foot building which was opened in November 2021 with 37 students. The school opened with only 9th and 10th grade, but has since expanded to be a full high school with 199 students for the 2025-2026 school year.
