= Hillsboro, Virginia =

Hillsboro may refer to a number of places in Virginia:

- Hillsboro, Albemarle County, Virginia also known as Yancey Mills
- Hillsboro, King and Queen County, Virginia
- Hillsboro, Loudoun County, Virginia
