= 2026–27 UAB Blazers men's basketball team =

American college basketball season

2026–27 UAB Blazers men's basketball
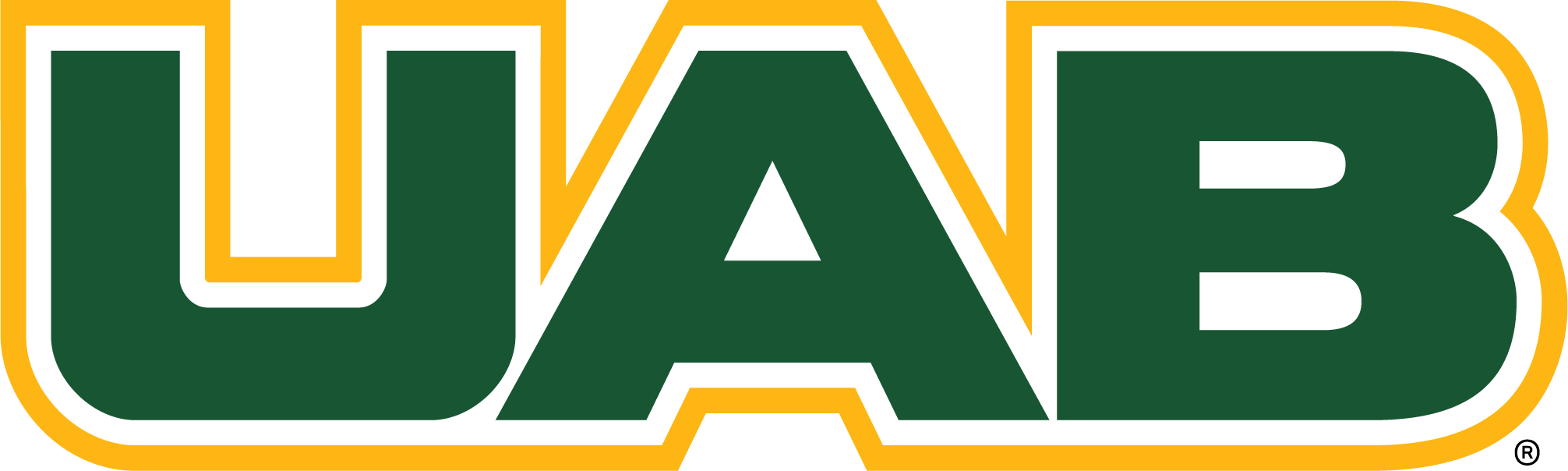
- Conference: American Conference
- Record: 1–1 (0–0 American)
- Head coach: Andy Kennedy (7th season)
- Assistant coaches: Rob Williams; Chris Shumate; Carter Heston; Jesee Bopp; Jon Coleman
- Home arena: Bartow Arena

2026–27 American Conference men's basketball standings
	Conf.				Overall
Team	W		L	PCT	W		L	PCT
Charlotte	0	–	0	–	2	–	0	1.000
North Texas	0	–	0	–	2	–	0	1.000
Tulsa	0	–	0	–	2	–	0	1.000
East Carolina	0	–	0	–	1	–	0	1.000
Memphis	0	–	0	–	1	–	0	1.000
Temple	0	–	0	–	1	–	0	1.000
Wichita State	0	–	0	–	1	–	0	1.000
Florida Atlantic	0	–	0	–	1	–	1	.500
Rice	0	–	0	–	1	–	1	.500
South Florida	0	–	0	–	1	–	1	.500
Tulane	0	–	0	–	1	–	1	.500
UAB	0	–	0	–	1	–	1	.500
UTSA	0	–	0	–	0	–	1	.000
† 2027 American tournament winner As of November 7, 2026; Rankings from AP poll

The 2026–27 UAB Blazers men's basketball team will represent the University of Alabama at Birmingham during the 2026-27 NCAA Division I men's basketball season. The team will be led by seventh-year head coach Andy Kennedy, and will play their home games at the Bartow Arena located in Birmingham, Alabama.

== Previous Season ==
The Blazers finished the 2025-26 season 20–12, 11–7 in the AAC. As the four seed, they would lose 83-78 to Charlotte in the AAC Tournament in the quarterfinals.

== Preseason ==
On October 9, 2026, the American Conference released their preseason polls. UAB was picked to finish sixth in the conference.

=== Preseason rankings ===
American Conference Preseason Poll
Place	Team	Votes
1	Wichita State	140 (9)
2	Memphis	131 (4)
3	South Florida	118
4	Tulsa	99
5	Charlotte	95
6	UAB	89
7	North Texas	84
8	Florida Atlantic	75
9	Temple	61
10	Tulane	52
11	East Carolina	34
12	Rice	22
13	UTSA	14
(#) first-place votes

=== Preseason All-American Conference Teams ===
Preseason All-American Conference Teams
Team	Player	Year	Position
Second	Justyn Fernandez	Senior	Guard
Second	Deuce Jones	Junior	Guard

== Roster ==
2026–27 UAB Blazers men's basketball team
Players
Coaches

Pos.	#	Name	Height	Weight	Year	Previous school	Hometown
G/F	0	Jeremy Elyzee	6 ft 7 in (2.01 m)	200 lb (91 kg)	Jr	Southeastern Louisiana	Hialeah, Florida
C	3	Matt Mbole	6 ft 11 in (2.11 m)	275 lb (125 kg)	Jr	South Georgia Tech	Yaoundé, Cameroon
G	4	Justyn Fernandez	6 ft 5 in (1.96 m)	210 lb (95 kg)	Sr	Delaware	Richmond, Virginia
G	5	Salim London	6 ft 4 in (1.93 m)	205 lb (93 kg)	So	Hoover High School	Hoover, Alabama
G	7	Elijah Duval	6 ft 3 in (1.91 m)	195 lb (88 kg)	So	Southern Utah	Wilmington, Delaware
G	8	Tim Holliday	6 ft 3 in (1.91 m)	190 lb (86 kg)	So	Itawamba Community College	Fulton, Mississippi
G	10	Korie Corbett	6 ft 5 in (1.96 m)	195 lb (88 kg)	Fr	Oak Hill Academy	Columbia, South Carolina
G	12	Deuce Jones	6 ft 2 in (1.88 m)	185 lb (84 kg)	Jr	Saint Joseph's	Trenton, New Jersey
F	13	Antallah Sandlin-El	6 ft 9 in (2.06 m)	220 lb (100 kg)	Jr	South Plains College	Lincoln, Nebraska
C	21	Kaleb Davis	6 ft 11 in (2.11 m)	215 lb (98 kg)	Fr	Houston High School	Collierville, Tennessee
F	24	Aleks Alston	6 ft 10 in (2.08 m)	220 lb (100 kg)	So	Maryland	Chicago, Illinois
G	55	T.J. Caldwell	6 ft 4 in (1.93 m)	195 lb (88 kg)	Sr	Arkansas State	Dallas, Texas

Head coach

- Andy Kennedy (UAB)

Assistant coach(es)

- Jesse Bopp (Plymouth State)
- Rob Williams (UAB)
- Chris Shumate (Murray State)
- Carter Heston (Alabama)
- Jon Coleman (UAB)

Legend

- (C) Team captain
- (S) Suspended
- (I) Ineligible
- (W) Walk-on
- Injured
- Current redshirt

Roster
Last update: October 15, 2026

== Schedule and results ==
Date time, TV	Rank^{#}	Opponent^{#}	Result	Record	High points	High rebounds	High assists	Site (attendance) city, state
Exhibition
October 19, 2026*; 6:00 pm		at No. 24 Vanderbilt	L 65–97	–	–	–	–	Memorial Gymnasium; Nashville, TN
October 27, 2026*; 7:30 pm		at Ole Miss	L 78–92	–	25 – Fernandez	5 – Elyzee	5 – London	SJB Pavilion; Oxford, MS
Non-conference regular season
November 2, 2026*; 4:00 pm, YouTube		vs. McNeese; Field of 68 Opening Day Marathon	L 78–99	0–1	15 – Duval	5 – Alston	5 – Duval	Rock Hill Sports & Event Center (452); Rock Hill, SC
November 6, 2026*; 6:30 p.m., ESPN+		Nicholls	W 70–63	1–1	14 – Tied	14 – Elyzee	4 – Jones	Bartow Arena (3,419); Birmingham, AL
November 9, 2026*; 6:30 p.m., ESPN+		Florida A&M						Bartow Arena; Birmingham, AL
November 14, 2026*; 6:00 pm		at Jacksonville State						Pete Mathews Coliseum; Jacksonville, AL
November 17, 2026*; 6:30 p.m., ESPN+		FIU						Bartow Arena; Birmingham, AL
November 20, 2026*; 1:00 pm, CBSSN		vs. George Washington; Greenbrier Tip-Off River Division						Colonial Hall; White Sulphur Springs, WV
November 22, 2026*; 6:00 pm, PassThaBall		vs. Rhode Island; Greenbrier Tip-Off River Division						Colonial Hall; White Sulphur Springs, WV
November 27, 2026*; 2:00 p.m., ESPN+		Auburn Montgomery						Bartow Arena; Birmingham, AL
December 2, 2026*; 6:30 p.m., ESPN+		Samford						Bartow Arena; Birmingham, AL
December 5, 2026*; 4:15 pm		at Troy						Trojan Arena; Troy, AL
December 8, 2026*; 6:00 p.m., ESPNU		Belmont						Bartow Arena; Birmingham, AL
December 12, 2026*; 4:00 pm		at Western Kentucky						E. A. Diddle Arena; Bowling Green, KY
December 17, 2026*; 6:30 p.m., ESPN+		Middle Tennessee						Bartow Arena; Birmingham, AL
December 21, 2026*; 2:00 p.m., ESPN+		UNC Asheville						Bartow Arena; Birmingham, AL
American regular season
December 30, 2026; 6:30 p.m., ESPN+		Tulane						Bartow Arena; Birmingham, AL
January 2, 2027; 3:00 p.m., ESPNU		East Carolina						Bartow Arena; Birmingham, AL
January 5, 2027; 5:30 p.m., ESPN+		at Temple						Liacouras Center; Philadelphia, PA
January 8, 2027; 8:00 p.m., ESPN2		at Wichita State						Charles Koch Arena; Wichita, KS
January 14, 2027; 8:00 p.m., ESPNU		Florida Atlantic						Bartow Arena; Birmingham, AL
January 17, 2027; 4:00 p.m., ESPN2		Memphis; Battle for the Bones						Bartow Arena; Birmingham, AL
January 23, 2027; 1:00 p.m., ESPN+		at East Carolina						Williams Arena; Greenville, NC
January 26, 2027; 6:00 p.m., ESPN+		at Charlotte						Dale F. Halton Arena; Charlotte, NC
January 31, 2027; 2:00 p.m., ESPN+		Temple						Bartow Arena; Birmingham, AL
February 4, 2027; 7:00 p.m., ESPN+		at Tulsa						Reynolds Center; Tulsa, OK
February 7, 2027; 3:00 p.m., ESPN2		at Memphis; Battle for the Bones						FedExForum; Memphis, TN
February 11, 2027; 6:30 p.m., ESPN+		North Texas						Bartow Arena; Birmingham, AL
February 14, 2027; 2:00 p.m., ESPN+		Charlotte						Bartow Arena; Birmingham, AL
February 21, 2027; 11:00 a.m., ESPN2/ESPNU		at South Florida						Yuengling Center; Tampa, FL
February 25, 2027; 7:00 p.m., ESPN+		at Rice						Tudor Fieldhouse; Houston, TX
February 28, 2027; 3:00 p.m., ESPNU		Tulsa						Bartow Arena; Birmingham, AL
March 4, 2027; 8:00 p.m., ESPNU		UTSA						Bartow Arena; Birmingham, AL
March 7, 2027; 1:00 p.m., ESPN+		at Florida Atlantic						Eleanor R. Baldwin Arena; Boca Raton, FL
*Non-conference game. ^{#}Rankings from AP poll. (#) Tournament seedings in parentheses. All times are in Central.
