= 2026–27 Temple Owls men's basketball team =

American college basketball season

2026–27 Temple Owls men's basketball
- Conference: American Conference
- Record: 2–2 (0–0 American)
- Head coach: Adam Fisher (4th season)
- Associate head coach: Michael Huger
- Assistant coaches: Bobby Jordan; Courtney Eldridge
- Home arena: Liacouras Center

2026–27 American Conference men's basketball standings
	Conf.				Overall
Team	W		L	PCT	W		L	PCT
Tulsa	0	–	0	–	4	–	0	1.000
East Carolina	0	–	0	–	3	–	1	.750
Florida Atlantic	0	–	0	–	3	–	1	.750
Memphis	0	–	0	–	3	–	1	.750
North Texas	0	–	0	–	3	–	1	.750
Wichita State	0	–	0	–	3	–	1	.750
Charlotte	0	–	0	–	2	–	2	.500
Rice	0	–	0	–	2	–	2	.500
South Florida	0	–	0	–	2	–	2	.500
Temple	0	–	0	–	2	–	2	.500
Tulane	0	–	0	–	2	–	2	.500
UAB	0	–	0	–	2	–	2	.500
UTSA	0	–	0	–	2	–	2	.500
† 2027 American tournament winner As of November 17, 2026; Rankings from AP poll

The 2026–27 Temple Owls men's basketball team represents Temple University during the 2026–27 NCAA Division I men's basketball season. The Owls, led by fourth-year head coach Adam Fisher, play their home games at the Liacouras Center in Philadelphia, Pennsylvania, as a member of the American Conference.

== Previous season ==
The Owls finished the 2025–26 season 16–16, 8–10 in American play. As the No. 10 seed in the American tournament, they lost to No. 7 seed Florida Atlantic 63–59 in the first round.

== Offseason ==
=== Roster turnover ===
Nine players from the 2025–26 team departed, including five who transferred to other Division I programs. Temple added nine transfers and one freshman, Derrick Morton-Rivera, and returned five players, including preseason all-conference guards Gavin Griffiths and Derrian Ford.

=== Departures ===
Temple departures
Name	Number	Pos.	Height	Weight	Year	Hometown	Reason for Departure
Jamai Felt	1	F	6'9"	205	(redshirt) Sophomore	Boston, Massachusetts	Transferred to Little Rock
Ayuba Bryant Jr.	2	F	6'9"	200	Freshman	Antwerp, Belgium	Transferred to North Florida
Spencer Mahoney	8	F	6'8"	220	(redshirt) Sophomore	Brooklyn, New York	Transferred to Denver
AJ Smith	9	G	6'5"	210	Senior	Charlotte, North Carolina	Graduated
Masiah Gilyard	10	G	6'3"	190	Senior	Brooklyn, New York	Graduated
Babatunde Durodola	11	F	6'8"	235	Sophomore	Toronto, Ontario	Transferred to Ball State
Connor Gal	13	G	6'4"	205	Senior	Malvern, Pennsylvania	Graduated
Aiden Tobiason	25	G	6'5"	200	Sophomore	Wilmington, Delaware	Transferred to Syracuse
Jordan Mason	32	G	6'3"	200	Senior	San Antonio, Texas	Graduated

=== Incoming transfers ===
Temple incoming transfers
Name	Number	Pos.	Height	Weight	Year	Hometown	Previous School
Deuce Drake	1	G	6'2"	200	Graduate Student	Oak Park, Michigan	Indiana
Dez White	2	G	6'3"	180	Senior	Jefferson City, Missouri	Oregon State
Cam Scott	3	G	6'6"	180	Junior	Lexington, South Carolina	South Carolina
Jordan Marsh	4	G	5'11"	150	Senior	Monroe, North Carolina	USC
Sir Issac Herron	11	F	6'10"	240	Graduate Student	Houston, Texas	Louisiana Tech
Edwin Suarez Jr.	23	F	6'6"	225	Senior	San Juan, Puerto Rico	Weber State
Baboucarr Njie	24	F/G	6'6"	205	Junior	Dayton, Ohio	UTSA
Christian Beam	32	C	7'1"	255	Senior	Woodland, Alabama	Georgia State
Dallis Dillard	55	G	6'3"	180	Graduate Student	Harlem, New York	IUP

=== 2026 recruiting class ===
Temple 2026 recruiting class
Name	Number	Pos.	Height	Weight	Hometown	High school
Derrick Morton-Rivera	44	G	6'4"	175	Philadelphia, Pennsylvania	Father Judge High School

== Preseason ==
On October 9, 2026, the American Conference released its preseason coaches' poll. Temple was picked to finish ninth in the conference, and Derrian Ford and Gavin Griffiths were named to the preseason all-conference second team.

=== Preseason rankings ===
American Conference Preseason Poll
Place	Team	Votes
1	Wichita State	140 (9)
2	Memphis	131 (4)
3	South Florida	118
4	Tulsa	99
5	Charlotte	95
6	UAB	89
7	North Texas	84
8	Florida Atlantic	75
9	Temple	61
10	Tulane	52
11	East Carolina	34
12	Rice	22
13	UTSA	14
(#) first-place votes

=== Preseason All-American Conference Teams ===
Preseason All-American Conference Teams
Team	Player	Year	Position
Second	Derrian Ford	Graduate Student	Guard
Second	Gavin Griffiths	Senior	Guard

== Roster ==
2026–27 Temple Owls men's basketball team
Players
Coaches

Pos.	#	Name	Height	Weight	Year	Previous school	Hometown
F	0	Gavin Griffiths	6 ft 7 in (2.01 m)	215 lb (98 kg)	Sr	Rutgers	Simsbury, Connecticut
G	1	Deuce Drake	6 ft 2 in (1.88 m)	200 lb (91 kg)	GS	Indiana	Oak Park, Michigan
G	2	Dez White	6 ft 3 in (1.91 m)	180 lb (82 kg)	Sr	Oregon State	Jefferson City, Missouri
G	3	Cam Scott	6 ft 6 in (1.98 m)	180 lb (82 kg)	Jr	South Carolina	Lexington, South Carolina
G	4	Jordan Marsh	5 ft 11 in (1.8 m)	150 lb (68 kg)	Sr	USC	Monroe, North Carolina
G	7	Cam Wallace	6 ft 5 in (1.96 m)	200 lb (91 kg)	So	Westtown School	Malvern, Pennsylvania
C	8	Mohamed Keita	7 ft 1 in (2.16 m)	230 lb (104 kg)	GS	Tulsa	Conakry, Guinea
F	11	Sir Issac Herron	6 ft 10 in (2.08 m)	240 lb (109 kg)	GS	Louisiana Tech	Houston, Texas
G	21	Olin Chamberlain Jr.	6 ft 0 in (1.83 m)	180 lb (82 kg)	So	St. Joseph's Preparatory School	Philadelphia, Pennsylvania
G	22	Derrian Ford	6 ft 4 in (1.93 m)	210 lb (95 kg)	GS	Arkansas State	Magnolia, Arkansas
F	23	Edwin Suarez Jr.	6 ft 6 in (1.98 m)	225 lb (102 kg)	Sr	Weber State	San Juan, Puerto Rico
F	24	Baboucarr Njie	6 ft 6 in (1.98 m)	205 lb (93 kg)	Jr	UTSA	Dayton, Ohio
C	32	Christian Beam	7 ft 1 in (2.16 m)	255 lb (116 kg)	Sr	Georgia State	Woodland, Alabama
G	44	Derrick Morton-Rivera	6 ft 4 in (1.93 m)	175 lb (79 kg)	Fr	Father Judge High School	Philadelphia, Pennsylvania
G	55	Dallis Dillard	6 ft 3 in (1.91 m)	180 lb (82 kg)	GS	IUP	Harlem, New York

Head coach

- Adam Fisher (Penn State)

Assistant coach(es)

- Michael Huger (Bowling Green)
- Bobby Jordan (Drexel)
- Courtney Eldridge

Legend

- (C) Team captain
- (S) Suspended
- (I) Ineligible
- (W) Walk-on
- Injured
- Current redshirt

Roster
Last update: November 8, 2026

== Schedule and results ==
Date time, TV	Rank^{#}	Opponent^{#}	Result	Record	High points	High rebounds	High assists	Site (attendance) city, state
Non-conference regular season
November 2, 2026*; 6:30 p.m., ESPN+		Central Connecticut	W 68–56	1–0	16 – Marsh	12 – Njie	4 – Marsh	Liacouras Center; Philadelphia, PA
November 8, 2026*; 5:00 p.m., ESPN2		vs. Richmond; Palestra 100th Anniversary	L 53–79	1–1	13 – Scott	5 – Tied	4 – Dillard	Palestra; Philadelphia, PA
November 11, 2026*; 6:30 p.m., ESPN+		Charleston	L 81–91	1–2	26 – Scott	8 – Griffiths	5 – Ford	Liacouras Center (2,502); Philadelphia, PA
November 15, 2026*; 2:00 p.m., ESPN+		at La Salle; Big 5 Classic Pod 1	W 84–71	2–2	20 – Ford	10 – Griffiths	5 – Dillard	John Glaser Arena (2,056); Philadelphia, PA
November 20, 2026*; 12:30 p.m., ESPN+		vs. Middle Tennessee; Paradise Jam Opening Round						Sports and Fitness Center; St. Thomas, VI
November 21–22, 2026*; TBA, ESPN+		vs. Indiana State or Stephen F. Austin; Paradise Jam						Sports and Fitness Center; St. Thomas, VI
November 23, 2026*; TBA, ESPN+		vs. TBD; Paradise Jam						Sports and Fitness Center; St. Thomas, VI
December 1, 2026*; 6:30 p.m., ESPN+		Villanova; Big 5 Classic Pod 1						Liacouras Center; Philadelphia, PA
December 5, 2026*; TBA, NBC Sports Philadelphia		vs. TBD; Big 5 Classic Championship/3rd/5th Place Game						Xfinity Mobile Arena; Philadelphia, PA
December 9, 2026*; 6:30 p.m., ESPN+		Cheyney (D-II)						Liacouras Center; Philadelphia, PA
December 12, 2026*; 2:00 p.m.		vs. St. Bonaventure; Palestra 100th Anniversary						Palestra; Philadelphia, PA
December 16, 2026*; 6:30 p.m., ESPN+		Dartmouth						Liacouras Center; Philadelphia, PA
December 19, 2026*; 2:00 p.m., ESPN+		Wright State						Liacouras Center; Philadelphia, PA
December 22, 2026*; 7:00 p.m., ESPN+		at Princeton						Jadwin Gymnasium; Princeton, NJ
American regular season
December 30, 2026; 2:00 p.m., ESPN+		at Rice						Tudor Fieldhouse; Houston, TX
January 2, 2027; 2:00 p.m., ESPN+		UTSA						Liacouras Center; Philadelphia, PA
January 5, 2027; 6:30 p.m., ESPN+		UAB						Liacouras Center; Philadelphia, PA
January 10, 2027; 4:00 p.m., ESPN+		at Charlotte						Dale F. Halton Arena; Charlotte, NC
January 14, 2027; 6:30 p.m., ESPN+		South Florida						Liacouras Center; Philadelphia, PA
January 17, 2027; 2:00 p.m., ESPN+		Rice						Liacouras Center; Philadelphia, PA
January 20, 2027; 7:30 p.m., ESPN+		at Tulane						Devlin Fieldhouse; New Orleans, LA
January 28, 2027; 6:30 p.m., ESPN+		Tulsa						Liacouras Center; Philadelphia, PA
January 31, 2027; 3:00 p.m., ESPN+		at UAB						Bartow Arena; Birmingham, AL
February 3, 2027; 8:00 p.m., ESPN+		at North Texas						UNT Coliseum; Denton, TX
February 7, 2027; 2:00 p.m., ESPN+		East Carolina						Liacouras Center; Philadelphia, PA
February 10, 2027; 7:00 p.m., ESPN+		at Florida Atlantic						Eleanor R. Baldwin Arena; Boca Raton, FL
February 13, 2027; 6:00 p.m., ESPNU		at South Florida						Yuengling Center; Tampa, FL
February 21, 2027; 2:00 p.m., ESPN+		Wichita State						Liacouras Center; Philadelphia, PA
February 24, 2027; 6:30 p.m., ESPN+		Tulane						Liacouras Center; Philadelphia, PA
February 27, 2027; 2:00 p.m., ESPN+		at East Carolina						Williams Arena at Minges Coliseum; Greenville, NC
March 4, 2027; 7:00 p.m., ESPN2		Memphis						Liacouras Center; Philadelphia, PA
March 7, 2027; 2:00 p.m., ESPN+		at UTSA						Convocation Center; San Antonio, TX
American tournament
March 10–14, 2027; TBA		vs. TBD						Yuengling Center; Tampa, FL
*Non-conference game. ^{#}Rankings from AP poll. (#) Tournament seedings in parentheses. All times are in Eastern Time.
