= 2026–27 South Florida Bulls men's basketball team =

American college basketball season

2026–27 South Florida Bulls men's basketball
- Conference: American Conference
- Record: 3–2 (0–0 American)
- Head coach: Chris Mack (1st season)
- Associate head coach: Jeremy Growe
- Assistant coaches: Christen Cunningham; Dante Jackson; Allen Payne
- Home arena: Yuengling Center

2026–27 American Conference men's basketball standings
	Conf.				Overall
Team	W		L	PCT	W		L	PCT
Tulsa	0	–	0	–	4	–	0	1.000
East Carolina	0	–	0	–	3	–	1	.750
Florida Atlantic	0	–	0	–	3	–	1	.750
Memphis	0	–	0	–	3	–	1	.750
North Texas	0	–	0	–	3	–	1	.750
Wichita State	0	–	0	–	3	–	1	.750
Charlotte	0	–	0	–	2	–	2	.500
Rice	0	–	0	–	2	–	2	.500
South Florida	0	–	0	–	2	–	2	.500
Temple	0	–	0	–	2	–	2	.500
Tulane	0	–	0	–	2	–	2	.500
UAB	0	–	0	–	2	–	2	.500
UTSA	0	–	0	–	2	–	2	.500
† 2027 American tournament winner As of November 18, 2026; Rankings from AP poll

The 2026–27 South Florida Bulls men's basketball team represents the University of South Florida during the 2026–27 NCAA Division I men's basketball season. The Bulls, led by first-year head coach Chris Mack, play their home games at the Yuengling Center in Tampa, Florida, as a member of the American Conference.

== Previous season ==
The Bulls finished the 2025–26 season 25–9, 15–3 in American play, to win the regular-season championship. As the No. 1 seed in the American tournament, they defeated Charlotte in the semifinals and Wichita State 70–55 in the championship game to earn the conference's automatic bid to the NCAA tournament. As the No. 11 seed in the East Region, they lost to No. 6 seed Louisville 83–79 in the first round.

== Offseason ==
=== Coaching change ===
Head coach Bryan Hodgson left after one season to become head coach at Providence. On March 25, 2026, USF hired Chris Mack, who had gone 45–20 in two seasons at the College of Charleston and previously coached Xavier and Louisville.

=== Roster turnover ===
No players from the 2025–26 team were initially on Mack's first roster, which was completed in May 2026 with 12 transfers and three high school signees. Guard Josh Omojafo, a member of the 2025–26 team, was later added back to the roster.

=== Departures ===
South Florida departures
Name	Number	Pos.	Height	Weight	Year	Hometown	Reason for Departure
Xavier Brown	0	G	6'2"	183	Senior	Williamsburg, Virginia	Graduated
De'Ante Green	1	F	6'9"	210	Senior	Asheville, North Carolina	Graduated
Wes Enis	2	G	6'2"	200	Junior	Conover, Ohio	Left the team
Isaiah Jones	3	F	6'7"	229	Senior	Nashville, Tennessee	Graduated
Devin Haid	4	G	6'5"	190	Senior	Wooster, Ohio	Graduated
Joseph Pinion	5	G	6'5"	200	Senior	Morrilton, Arkansas	Graduated
Daimion Collins	6	F	6'9"	200	(redshirt) Senior	Atlanta, Texas	Graduated
Caleb Sanders	7	F	6'6"	185	Freshman	Tampa, Florida	Left the team
Gavin Hightower	9	G	6'1"	165	Freshman	Los Angeles, California	Left the team
Tristan Beckford	10	F	6'5"	180	Freshman	Maple, Ontario	Left the team
CJ Brown	11	G	6'2"	175	Sophomore	Marietta, Georgia	Left the team
Onyx Nnani	15	F	6'9"	215	Freshman	Edmonton, Alberta	Left the team
Adriel Nyorha	21	G	6'5"	175	Freshman	Ottawa, Ontario	Left the team
Izaiyah Nelson	35	F	6'10"	218	Senior	Marietta, Georgia	Graduated

=== Incoming transfers ===
South Florida incoming transfers
Name	Number	Pos.	Height	Weight	Year	Hometown	Previous School
Mike James	0	G	6'5"	205	Graduate Student	Orlando, Florida	Vanderbilt
Zayden High	1	F	6'10"	230	Junior	San Antonio, Texas	North Carolina
Sonny Wilson	3	G	6'1"	175	Senior	Pontiac, Michigan	Toledo
Chris Davis Jr.	4	G	6'4"	200	Sophomore	Madison, Wisconsin	Charleston
Joshua Lewis	5	F	6'7"	185	Sophomore	Tampa, Florida	Louisiana
Reph Stevenson	6	F	6'9"	225	Senior	Fishers, Indiana	DePauw
Garrett Johnson	9	F	6'8"	220	Junior	Oakton, Virginia	George Washington
AJ Dancler	11	G	6'2"	180	Senior	Indianapolis, Indiana	Coastal Carolina
Richard Goods	12	F	6'9"	225	Junior	Greensboro, North Carolina	Stony Brook
Tiefing Diawara	18	C	7'0"	240	(redshirt) Freshman	Mopti, Mali	Syracuse
Andrej Shoshkikj	29	G	6'2"	182	Sophomore	Skopje, North Macedonia	Stony Brook
Donovan Waleskowski	33	G	6'5"	205	Sophomore	Cincinnati, Ohio	Holy Cross College

=== 2026 recruiting class ===
South Florida 2026 recruiting class
Name	Number	Pos.	Height	Weight	Hometown	High school
Darren Moore	2	G	6'2"	170	Olney, Maryland	Northfield Mount Hermon School
Jayden Johnson	7	G	6'6"	210	Louisville, Kentucky	Trinity High School
Jake Feldhaus	20	F	6'8"	220	Richmond, Kentucky	Madison Central High School

== Preseason ==
On October 9, 2026, the American Conference released its preseason coaches' poll. South Florida was picked to finish third in the conference, and Sonny Wilson was named to the preseason all-conference first team.

=== Preseason rankings ===
American Conference Preseason Poll
Place	Team	Votes
1	Wichita State	140 (9)
2	Memphis	131 (4)
3	South Florida	118
4	Tulsa	99
5	Charlotte	95
6	UAB	89
7	North Texas	84
8	Florida Atlantic	75
9	Temple	61
10	Tulane	52
11	East Carolina	34
12	Rice	22
13	UTSA	14
(#) first-place votes

=== Preseason All-American Conference Teams ===
Preseason All-American Conference Teams
Team	Player	Year	Position
First	Sonny Wilson	Senior	Guard

== Roster ==
2026–27 South Florida Bulls men's basketball team
Players
Coaches

Pos.	#	Name	Height	Weight	Year	Previous school	Hometown
G	0	Mike James	6 ft 5 in (1.96 m)	205 lb (93 kg)	GS	Vanderbilt	Orlando, Florida
F	1	Zayden High	6 ft 10 in (2.08 m)	230 lb (104 kg)	Jr	North Carolina	San Antonio, Texas
G	2	Darren Moore	6 ft 2 in (1.88 m)	170 lb (77 kg)	Fr	Northfield Mount Hermon School	Olney, Maryland
G	3	Sonny Wilson	6 ft 1 in (1.85 m)	175 lb (79 kg)	Sr	Toledo	Pontiac, Michigan
G	4	Chris Davis Jr.	6 ft 4 in (1.93 m)	200 lb (91 kg)	So	Charleston	Madison, Wisconsin
F	5	Joshua Lewis	6 ft 7 in (2.01 m)	185 lb (84 kg)	So	Louisiana	Tampa, Florida
F	6	Reph Stevenson	6 ft 9 in (2.06 m)	225 lb (102 kg)	Sr	DePauw	Fishers, Indiana
G	7	Jayden Johnson	6 ft 6 in (1.98 m)	210 lb (95 kg)	Fr	Trinity High School	Louisville, Kentucky
G	8	Josh Omojafo	6 ft 5 in (1.96 m)	200 lb (91 kg)	RS Sr	Robert Morris	Hamilton, Ontario
F	9	Garrett Johnson	6 ft 8 in (2.03 m)	220 lb (100 kg)	Jr	George Washington	Oakton, Virginia
G	11	AJ Dancler	6 ft 2 in (1.88 m)	180 lb (82 kg)	Sr	Coastal Carolina	Indianapolis, Indiana
F	12	Richard Goods	6 ft 9 in (2.06 m)	225 lb (102 kg)	Jr	Stony Brook	Greensboro, North Carolina
C	18	Tiefing Diawara	7 ft 0 in (2.13 m)	240 lb (109 kg)	RS Fr	Syracuse	Mopti, Mali
F	20	Jake Feldhaus	6 ft 8 in (2.03 m)	220 lb (100 kg)	Fr	Madison Central High School	Richmond, Kentucky
G	29	Andrej Shoshkikj	6 ft 2 in (1.88 m)	182 lb (83 kg)	So	Stony Brook	Skopje, North Macedonia
G	33	Donovan Waleskowski	6 ft 5 in (1.96 m)	205 lb (93 kg)	So	Holy Cross College	Cincinnati, Ohio

Head coach

- Chris Mack (Xavier)

Assistant coach(es)

- Jeremy Growe
- Christen Cunningham
- Dante Jackson
- Allen Payne

Legend

- (C) Team captain
- (S) Suspended
- (I) Ineligible
- (W) Walk-on
- Injured
- Current redshirt

Roster
Last update: November 8, 2026

== Schedule and results ==
Date time, TV	Rank^{#}	Opponent^{#}	Result	Record	High points	High rebounds	High assists	Site (attendance) city, state
Exhibition
October 19, 2026*; 7:00 p.m.		Saint Leo (D-II)	W 104–72	–	30 – Davis Jr.	8 – Wilson	8 – Wilson	Yuengling Center (2,425); Tampa, FL
Non-conference regular season
November 2, 2026*; 7:00 p.m.		Charleston Southern	W 98–71	1–0	20 – High	8 – Tied	6 – Wilson	Yuengling Center (4,692); Tampa, FL
November 5, 2026*; 8:30 p.m.		at DePaul	L 80–82	1–1	26 – G. Johnson	6 – James	10 – Wilson	Wintrust Arena (3,025); Chicago, IL
November 11, 2026*; 3:00 p.m., CBSSN		vs. Saint Joseph's; Veterans Classic	L 80–83	1–2	16 – Tied	9 – James	6 – Wilson	Alumni Hall; Annapolis, MD
November 14, 2026*; 2:00 p.m.		Coppin State	W 73–63	2–2	18 – High	17 – High	3 – Tied	Yuengling Center (2,677); Tampa, FL
November 17, 2026*; 7:00 p.m., ESPN+		Tennessee State	W 98–71	3–2	22 – Wilson	9 – Johnson	6 – Wilson	Yuengling Center (2,599); Tampa, FL
November 21, 2026*; 4:00 p.m., ESPN+		at George Mason						EagleBank Arena; Fairfax, VA
November 24, 2026*; 7:00 p.m.		Stetson						Yuengling Center; Tampa, FL
November 29, 2026*; 3:30 p.m., ESPN2		vs. Saint Louis; A-10/American Showcase						Nationwide Arena; Columbus, OH
December 2, 2026*; 7:00 p.m.		West Florida						Yuengling Center; Tampa, FL
December 9, 2026*; 7:00 p.m.		Jacksonville						Yuengling Center; Tampa, FL
December 12, 2026*; 7:00 p.m., Spectrum News 1		at Dayton						UD Arena; Dayton, OH
December 16, 2026*; 7:00 p.m.		Alabama						Yuengling Center; Tampa, FL
December 19, 2026*; 2:00 p.m.		Kennesaw State; Love Wins Classic						Yuengling Center; Tampa, FL
December 22, 2026*; 7:00 p.m.		at Charleston						TD Arena; Charleston, SC
American regular season
December 30, 2026; 8:00 p.m., ESPN2		at Tulsa						Reynolds Center; Tulsa, OK
January 3, 2027; 1:00 p.m.		Memphis						Yuengling Center; Tampa, FL
January 7, 2027; 7:00 p.m.		Charlotte						Yuengling Center; Tampa, FL
January 10, 2027; 3:00 p.m.		at Tulane						Fogelman Arena; New Orleans, LA
January 14, 2027; 6:30 p.m.		at Temple						Liacouras Center; Philadelphia, PA
January 17, 2027; 1:00 p.m.		Tulsa						Yuengling Center; Tampa, FL
January 23, 2027; 2:00 p.m.		at UTSA						Convocation Center; San Antonio, TX
January 26, 2027; 9:00 p.m.		Rice						Yuengling Center; Tampa, FL
January 31, 2027; 2:00 p.m.		at Florida Atlantic						Eleanor R. Baldwin Arena; Boca Raton, FL
February 4, 2027; 6:00 p.m.		Wichita State						Yuengling Center; Tampa, FL
February 7, 2027; 2:00 p.m.		at Charlotte						Dale F. Halton Arena; Charlotte, NC
February 10, 2027; 7:00 p.m.		at East Carolina						Williams Arena at Minges Coliseum; Greenville, NC
February 13, 2027; 6:00 p.m.		Temple						Yuengling Center; Tampa, FL
February 18, 2027; 6:00 p.m.		at Wichita State						Charles Koch Arena; Wichita, KS
February 21, 2027; 12:00 p.m., ESPN2 or ESPNU		UAB						Yuengling Center; Tampa, FL
February 24, 2027; 7:00 p.m.		North Texas						Yuengling Center; Tampa, FL
February 28, 2027; 12:00 p.m.		at Memphis						FedExForum; Memphis, TN
March 4, 2027; 9:00 p.m.		Florida Atlantic						Yuengling Center; Tampa, FL
American tournament
March 10–14, 2027; TBA		TBD						Yuengling Center; Tampa, FL
*Non-conference game. ^{#}Rankings from AP poll. (#) Tournament seedings in parentheses. All times are in Eastern Time.
