= 2026–27 Memphis Tigers men's basketball team =

American college basketball season

2026–27 Memphis Tigers men's basketball
- Conference: American Conference
- Record: 3–1 (0–0 American)
- Head coach: Penny Hardaway (9th season)
- Assistant coaches: Tony Madlock; Sean Mock; Trevor DeLoach
- Home arena: FedExForum (Capacity: 18,119)

2026–27 American Conference men's basketball standings
	Conf.				Overall
Team	W		L	PCT	W		L	PCT
Tulsa	0	–	0	–	3	–	0	1.000
East Carolina	0	–	0	–	3	–	1	.750
Florida Atlantic	0	–	0	–	3	–	1	.750
Memphis	0	–	0	–	3	–	1	.750
North Texas	0	–	0	–	3	–	1	.750
Wichita State	0	–	0	–	3	–	1	.750
Charlotte	0	–	0	–	2	–	2	.500
Rice	0	–	0	–	2	–	2	.500
South Florida	0	–	0	–	2	–	2	.500
Tulane	0	–	0	–	2	–	2	.500
UAB	0	–	0	–	2	–	2	.500
UTSA	0	–	0	–	2	–	2	.500
Temple	0	–	0	–	2	–	2	.500
† 2027 American tournament winner As of November 17, 2026; Rankings from AP poll

The 2026–27 Memphis Tigers men's basketball team represents the University of Memphis in the 2026–27 NCAA Division I men's basketball season. The Tigers, led by ninth-year head coach Penny Hardaway, play their home games at FedExForum as members of the American Conference.

== Previous season ==
The Tigers finished the 2025–26 season 13–19, 8–10 in American Conference play to finish in a tie for eighth place. They were defeated by Tulane in the first round of the American tournament and did not qualify for any postseason play.

== Offseason ==
=== Coaching changes ===
Following the season, Memphis announced that Hardaway would return as head coach for a ninth season, with staff changes expected and a general manager to be hired. Assistant coaches Mike Davis, Jermaine Johnson and Roy Rogers were not retained. On March 30, 2026, Hardaway added Tony Madlock as associate head coach and Sean Mock and Trevor DeLoach as assistant coaches. Steve Wright, previously an assistant at Missouri, was added as an assistant on April 17. Memphis also hired Gabriel Harris as the program's first general manager of men's basketball.

=== Roster changes ===
Only Julius Thedford and William Whorton returned from the 2025–26 roster; Ashton Hardaway and Curtis Givens III entered the transfer portal. The Tigers rebuilt the roster largely through the transfer portal and added three incoming freshmen, Parker Pounds, Cello Jackson Jr. and Fred Smith Jr. The program's revenue-share budget for men's basketball was set at $9 million for the 2026–27 fiscal year.

Forward Nemanja Popovic was cleared by the NCAA for two years of eligibility but was required to serve a six-game withholding period to begin the season because of previous international competition.

== Preseason ==
On October 9, 2026, the American Conference released its preseason poll. Memphis was picked to finish second in the conference, receiving four first-place votes.

=== Preseason rankings ===
American Preseason Poll
Place	Team	Votes
1	Wichita State	140 (9)
2	Memphis	131 (4)
3	South Florida	118
4	Tulsa	99
5	Charlotte	95
6	UAB	89
7	North Texas	84
8	Florida Atlantic	75
9	Temple	61
10	Tulane	52
11	East Carolina	34
12	Rice	22
13	UTSA	14
(#) first-place votes

=== Preseason All-Conference Teams ===
Preseason All-Conference Teams
Team	Player	Year	Position
First	Jayden Reid	Senior	Guard
Second	Tylik Weeks	Senior	Forward

== Roster ==
2026–27 Memphis Tigers men's basketball team
Players
Coaches

Pos.	#	Name	Height	Weight	Year	Previous school	Hometown
G	0	Jayden Reid	5 ft 10 in (1.78 m)	175 lb (79 kg)	Sr	Northwestern	Westbury, New York
G	1	Josh Holloway	6 ft 2 in (1.88 m)	185 lb (84 kg)	Sr	Texas A&M	Memphis, Tennessee
F	2	Corneilous Williams	6 ft 10 in (2.08 m)	220 lb (100 kg)	GS	North Alabama	Beaumont, Mississippi
G	3	Brandin Cummings	6 ft 3 in (1.91 m)	175 lb (79 kg)	Jr	Pittsburgh	Midland, Pennsylvania
F	4	Tylik Weeks	6 ft 7 in (2.01 m)	225 lb (102 kg)	Sr	Southern Miss	New York, New York
G	5	Julius Thedford	6 ft 5 in (1.96 m)	210 lb (95 kg)	Jr	Western Kentucky	Memphis, Tennessee
G	6	Parker Pounds	6 ft 6 in (1.98 m)	190 lb (86 kg)	Fr	Briarcrest Christian School	Memphis, Tennessee
F	7	Jerry Deng	6 ft 9 in (2.06 m)	225 lb (102 kg)	Sr	NC State	Rochester, New York
G	10	Luke Almodovar	6 ft 3 in (1.91 m)	195 lb (88 kg)	Sr	Southeast Missouri State	Noblesville, Indiana
G	11	Cello Jackson Jr.	6 ft 4 in (1.93 m)	205 lb (93 kg)	Fr	Christopher Columbus High School (Florida)	Memphis, Tennessee
F	12	William Whorton	6 ft 8 in (2.03 m)	210 lb (95 kg)	Sr	South Dakota State	Milwaukee, Wisconsin
F	15	Rihards Vavers	6 ft 7 in (2.01 m)	205 lb (93 kg)	Sr	Washington State	Adaži, Latvia
F	17	Nemanja Popovic	6 ft 9 in (2.06 m)	215 lb (98 kg)	Sr	King Szczecin	Topola, Serbia
F	30	Fred Smith Jr.	6 ft 7 in (2.01 m)	210 lb (95 kg)	Fr	Briarcrest Christian School	Memphis, Tennessee
F	77	Maxim Logue	6 ft 9 in (2.06 m)	232 lb (105 kg)	Jr	Florida Atlantic	Lyon, France

Head coach

- Penny Hardaway (Memphis)

Assistant coach(es)

- Tony Madlock
- Trevor DeLoach
- Sean Mock (Miami (OH))
- Steve Wright

Legend

- (C) Team captain
- (S) Suspended
- (I) Ineligible
- (W) Walk-on
- Injured
- Current redshirt

Roster
Last update: November 7, 2026

== Schedule and results ==
Date time, TV	Rank^{#}	Opponent^{#}	Result	Record	High points	High rebounds	High assists	Site (attendance) city, state
Exhibition
October 23, 2026; 7:00 p.m.		at Mississippi State	W 75–58	–	26 – Reid	–	–	Humphrey Coliseum; Starkville, MS
October 28, 2026; 7:00 p.m., SECN+		at No. 12 Arkansas	L 81–93	–	16 – Tied	–	–	Bud Walton Arena; Fayetteville, AR
Regular season
November 2, 2026*; 6:00 p.m., FS1		vs. No. 18 Iowa State	W 80–76	1–0	26 – Reid	8 – Tied	4 – Weeks	Sanford Pentagon (3,458); Sioux Falls, SD
November 7, 2026*; 2:00 p.m., ESPN+		VCU	W 89–88	2–0	32 – Reid	6 – Williams	7 – Reid	FedExForum (10,312); Memphis, TN
November 10, 2026*; 6:15 p.m., SECN+		at No. 22 Vanderbilt	L 81–105	2–1	21 – Almodovar	5 – Holloway	2 – Tied	Memorial Gymnasium (9,350); Nashville, TN
November 15, 2026*; 12:00 p.m., ESPN		No. 10 Louisville; Rivalry	W 98–78	3–1	24 – Tied	5 – Tied	10 – Reid	FedExForum (12,516); Memphis, TN
November 22, 2026*; 1:00 p.m., ESPN+		Evansville						FedExForum; Memphis, TN
November 25, 2026*; 4:00 p.m., ESPNU		vs. Penn State; Battle 4 Atlantis						Imperial Arena; Paradise Island, Bahamas
November 27, 2026*; TBD, TBD		vs. Mississippi State or Wake Forest; Battle 4 Atlantis						Imperial Arena; Paradise Island, Bahamas
November 29, 2026*; 12:00 p.m.		vs. Dayton; Atlantic 10–American Showcase						Nationwide Arena; Columbus, OH
December 2, 2026*; 11:00 a.m.		Jackson State						FedExForum; Memphis, TN
December 5, 2026*		at Baylor						Foster Pavilion; Waco, TX
December 11, 2026*; 7:00 p.m.		Grand Canyon						FedExForum; Memphis, TN
December 16, 2026*		at Texas						Moody Center; Austin, TX
December 22, 2026*; 7:00 p.m.		Little Rock						FedExForum; Memphis, TN
December 30, 2026; 7:00 p.m.		East Carolina						FedExForum; Memphis, TN
January 3, 2027		at South Florida						Yuengling Center; Tampa, FL
January 6, 2027; 7:00 p.m.		Rice						FedExForum; Memphis, TN
January 10, 2027		at Florida Atlantic						Eleanor R. Baldwin Arena; Boca Raton, FL
January 14, 2027		Wichita State						FedExForum; Memphis, TN
January 17, 2027		at UAB; Battle for the Bones						Bartow Arena; Birmingham, AL
January 20, 2027		at Charlotte						Dale F. Halton Arena; Charlotte, NC
January 23, 2027; 2:00 p.m.		North Texas						FedExForum; Memphis, TN
January 28, 2027		at Wichita State						Charles Koch Arena; Wichita, KS
February 2, 2027		at Tulane						Devlin Fieldhouse; New Orleans, LA
February 7, 2027; 2:00 p.m.		UAB; Battle for the Bones						FedExForum; Memphis, TN
February 11, 2027; 7:00 p.m.		Charlotte						FedExForum; Memphis, TN
February 14, 2027		at UTSA						UTSA Convocation Center; San Antonio, TX
February 17, 2027		at North Texas						UNT Coliseum; Denton, TX
February 20, 2027*		Utah State						FedExForum; Memphis, TN
February 25, 2027		Tulsa						FedExForum; Memphis, TN
February 28, 2027		South Florida						FedExForum; Memphis, TN
March 4, 2027		at Temple						Liacouras Center; Philadelphia, PA
March 7, 2027; 2:00 p.m.		Tulane						FedExForum; Memphis, TN
*Non-conference game. ^{#}Rankings from AP poll. (#) Tournament seedings in parentheses. All times are in Central Time.

== Rankings ==
Ranking movements Legend: ██ Increase in ranking ██ Decrease in ranking — = Not ranked RV = Received votes
	Week																				
Poll	Pre	1	2	3	4	5	6	7	8	9	10	11	12	13	14	15	16	17	18	19	Final
AP	—	RV	RV																		
Coaches	—	RV	RV																		
