= 2027 American Conference men's basketball tournament =

- Classification: Division I
- Season: 2026–27
- Teams: 10
- Site: Yuengling Center; Tampa, Florida
- Television: ESPN, ESPN2, ESPNU, ESPNews, ESPN+

2026–27 American Conference men's basketball standings
	Conf.				Overall
Team	W		L	PCT	W		L	PCT
Charlotte	0	–	0	–	0	–	0	–
East Carolina	0	–	0	–	0	–	0	–
Florida Atlantic	0	–	0	–	0	–	0	–
Memphis	0	–	0	–	0	–	0	–
North Texas	0	–	0	–	0	–	0	–
Rice	0	–	0	–	0	–	0	–
South Florida	0	–	0	–	0	–	0	–
Temple	0	–	0	–	0	–	0	–
Tulane	0	–	0	–	0	–	0	–
Tulsa	0	–	0	–	0	–	0	–
UAB	0	–	0	–	0	–	0	–
UTSA	0	–	0	–	0	–	0	–
Wichita State	0	–	0	–	0	–	0	–
† 2027 American tournament winner

The 2027 American Conference men's basketball tournament will the postseason men's basketball tournament for the American Conference for the 2026-27 season. The tournament will be held from March 10-14, 2027, at Yuengling Center in Tampa, Florida. The tournament winner will receive the automatic bid to the NCAA Tournament.

This will be the second conference tournament under the American Conference name as inn July 2025, the conference dropped the word "Athletic" from its name, renaming itself the American Conference.

== Seeds ==
Only the top ten conference teams will qualify to participate in the tournament. Teams will be seeded by conference record. The conference adopted a stepladder format for the tournament, with the top two seeds receiving byes to the semifinals, the third and fourth seeds to the quarterfinals, and so on.

Tiebreakers may be applied as needed to properly seed the teams.

Seed	School	Conference record	Tiebreaker 1	Tiebreaker 2
1				
2				
3				
4				
5				
6				
7				
8				
9				
10				
DNQ				
DNQ				
DNQ				

== Venue ==
Tampa was announced as the host city in May 2026, with Yuengling Center serving as the venue for the first time ever and will host the tournament next year.

== Schedule ==
Game	Time *	Matchup	Score	Television
First Round – Wednesday, March 10
1	TBD	No. 7 Seed vs No. 10 Seed		TBD
2	TBD	No. 8 Seed vs No. 9 Seed		TBD
Second Round – Thursday, March 11
3	TBD	No. 5 Seed vs Winner of Game 1		TBD
4	TBD	No. 6 Seed vs Winner of Game 2		TBD
Quarterfinals – Friday, March 12
5	TBD	No. 3 Seed vs Winner of Game 3		TBD
6	TBD	No. 4 Seed vs Winner of Game 4		TBD
Semifinals – Saturday, March 13
7	TBD	No. 1 Seed vs Winner of Game 5		TBD
8	TBD	No. 2 Seed vs Winner of Game 6		TBD
Final – Sunday, March 14
9	TBD	Game 7 Winner vs Game 8 Winner		TBD
* Game times in CDT; ()-ranking denotes tournament seeding.

== Bracket ==
First Round; March 10; TBD
8
9
7
10

Second Round; March 11; TBD
5
6

Quarterfinals; March 12; TBD
4
3

Semifinals; March 13; TBD
1
2

Final; March 14; TBD

== See also ==
- 2027 American Conference women's basketball tournament
