= 2026–27 Wichita State Shockers men's basketball team =

American college basketball season

2026–27 Wichita State Shockers men's basketball
- Conference: American Conference
- Record: 2–1 (0–0 American)
- Head coach: Paul Mills (4th season)
- Associate head coach: Kenton Paulino
- Assistant coaches: Josh Eilert; P. J. Couisnard; Xavier Holland; Dusan Vicentic
- Home arena: Charles Koch Arena

2026–27 American Conference men's basketball standings
	Conf.				Overall
Team	W		L	PCT	W		L	PCT
Tulsa	0	–	0	–	4	–	0	1.000
Florida Atlantic	0	–	0	–	4	–	1	.800
Wichita State	0	–	0	–	4	–	1	.800
East Carolina	0	–	0	–	3	–	1	.750
Memphis	0	–	0	–	3	–	1	.750
North Texas	0	–	0	–	3	–	1	.750
Charlotte	0	–	0	–	3	–	2	.600
Rice	0	–	0	–	3	–	2	.600
South Florida	0	–	0	–	3	–	2	.600
UAB	0	–	0	–	3	–	2	.600
Temple	0	–	0	–	2	–	2	.500
Tulane	0	–	0	–	2	–	2	.500
UTSA	0	–	0	–	3	–	2	.600
† 2027 American tournament winner As of November 19, 2026; Rankings from AP poll

The 2026–27 Wichita State Shockers men's basketball team represents Wichita State University during the 2026–27 NCAA Division I men's basketball season. The Shockers, led by fourth-year head coach Paul Mills, play their home games at Charles Koch Arena in Wichita, Kansas, as a member of the American Conference.

== Previous season ==
The Shockers finished the 2025–26 season 24–12, 13–5 in American play, to finish tied for second place. As the No. 2 seed in the American tournament, they defeated Tulsa 81–68 in the semifinals before losing to South Florida 70–55 in the championship game. They received a bid to the NIT, where they defeated Wyoming and Oklahoma State before losing to Tulsa 83–79 in the quarterfinals.

== Offseason ==
=== Roster turnover ===
Wichita State's first offseason priority was retaining its returning players. Leading scorer Kenyon Giles, preseason all-conference center Will Berg and forward Dillon Battie were among those who returned, while five newcomers were added: four Division I transfers and junior college guard Desmeon Jones. Center Emmanuel Okorafor was added to the roster before the season opener, while forward Noah Hill was reported to be out for the season.

=== Departures ===
Wichita State departures
Name	Number	Pos.	Height	Weight	Year	Hometown	Reason for Departure
Karon Boyd	0	F	6'6"	225	Senior	Queens, New York	Graduated
Dre Kindell	3	G	5'11"	168	Junior	Cincinnati, Ohio	Transferred to Drake
Brian Amuneke	5	G	6'5"	188	Sophomore	Los Angeles, California	Transferred to Fresno State

=== Incoming transfers ===
Wichita State incoming transfers
Name	Number	Pos.	Height	Weight	Year	Hometown	Previous School
Desmeon Jones	0	G	5'11"	176	Sophomore	Dallas, Texas	Blinn College
Bryce Heard	1	G	6'6"	201	Junior	Chicago, Illinois	Dayton
Jordan Frison	5	G	6'0"	171	Senior	Memphis, Tennessee	Chattanooga
Jahari Long	11	G	6'5"	211	Graduate Student	Houston, Texas	George Mason
Cyr Malonga	24	C	6'11"	253	Senior	Pointe-Noire, Congo	New Mexico State

== Preseason ==
On October 9, 2026, the American Conference released its preseason coaches' poll. Wichita State was picked to win the conference, receiving nine of 13 first-place votes. Will Berg was named to the preseason all-conference first team, and Dillon Battie and Jordan Frison were named to the second team.

=== Preseason rankings ===
American Conference Preseason Poll
Place	Team	Votes
1	Wichita State	140 (9)
2	Memphis	131 (4)
3	South Florida	118
4	Tulsa	99
5	Charlotte	95
6	UAB	89
7	North Texas	84
8	Florida Atlantic	75
9	Temple	61
10	Tulane	52
11	East Carolina	34
12	Rice	22
13	UTSA	14
(#) first-place votes

=== Preseason All-American Conference Teams ===
Preseason All-American Conference Teams
Team	Player	Year	Position
First	Will Berg	Redshirt Senior	Center
Second	Dillon Battie	Junior	Forward
Second	Jordan Frison	Senior	Guard

== Roster ==
2026–27 Wichita State Shockers men's basketball team
Players
Coaches

Pos.	#	Name	Height	Weight	Year	Previous school	Hometown
G	0	Desmeon Jones	5 ft 11 in (1.8 m)	176 lb (80 kg)	So	Blinn College	Dallas, Texas
G	1	Bryce Heard	6 ft 6 in (1.98 m)	201 lb (91 kg)	Jr	Dayton	Chicago, Illinois
F	2	Jaret Valencia	6 ft 9 in (2.06 m)	189 lb (86 kg)	RS Sr	Monmouth	Quibdó, Colombia
G	3	Kenyon Giles	5 ft 10 in (1.78 m)	171 lb (78 kg)	GS	UNC Greensboro	Chesapeake, Virginia
G	4	TJ Williams	6 ft 5 in (1.96 m)	221 lb (100 kg)	RS So	Wichita Heights High School	Wichita, Kansas
G	5	Jordan Frison	6 ft 0 in (1.83 m)	171 lb (78 kg)	Sr	Chattanooga	Memphis, Tennessee
G	7	Pierre Couisnard	6 ft 2 in (1.88 m)	168 lb (76 kg)	RS Fr	Legacy School of Sport Sciences	Houston, Texas
F	8	Dillon Battie	6 ft 9 in (2.06 m)	215 lb (98 kg)	Jr	Temple	Dallas, Texas
G	9	Michael Gray Jr.	6 ft 2 in (1.88 m)	211 lb (96 kg)	GS	Nicholls State	Fredericksburg, Virginia
G	10	Tyrus Rathan-Mayes	6 ft 6 in (1.98 m)	198 lb (90 kg)	RS Fr	Legacy School of Sport Sciences	Toronto, Ontario
G	11	Jahari Long	6 ft 5 in (1.96 m)	211 lb (96 kg)	GS	George Mason	Houston, Texas
G	12	Joy Ighovodja	6 ft 4 in (1.93 m)	203 lb (92 kg)	RS Jr	NBA Academy Africa	Abeokuta, Nigeria
F	20	Emmanuel Okorafor	6 ft 10 in (2.08 m)	236 lb (107 kg)	GS	Seton Hall	Abia, Nigeria
F	21	Henry Thengvall	6 ft 7 in (2.01 m)	203 lb (92 kg)	RS Sr	Kapaun Mt. Carmel Catholic High School	Wichita, Kansas
F	22	Noah Hill (injured)	6 ft 8 in (2.03 m)	239 lb (108 kg)	So	Sunrise Christian Academy	Frisco, Texas
C	24	Cyr Malonga	6 ft 11 in (2.11 m)	253 lb (115 kg)	Sr	New Mexico State	Pointe-Noire, Congo
C	44	Will Berg	7 ft 2 in (2.18 m)	263 lb (119 kg)	RS Sr	Purdue	Stockholm, Sweden

Head coach

- Paul Mills (Texas A&M)

Assistant coach(es)

- Kenton Paulino (Texas)
- Josh Eilert (Kansas State)
- P. J. Couisnard (Wichita State)
- Xavier Holland
- Dusan Vicentic

Legend

- (C) Team captain
- (S) Suspended
- (I) Ineligible
- (W) Walk-on
- Injured
- Current redshirt

Roster
Last update: November 8, 2026

== Schedule and results ==
Date time, TV	Rank^{#}	Opponent^{#}	Result	Record	High points	High rebounds	High assists	Site (attendance) city, state
Exhibition
October 7, 2026*; 6:30 p.m.		Murray State; Charity scrimmage	L 87–93	–	19 – Battie	10 – Battie	6 – Tied	Charles Koch Arena; Wichita, KS
Non-conference regular season
November 4, 2026*; 6:30 p.m.		CSUN	W 79–67	1–0	26 – Berg	16 – Berg	8 – Giles	Charles Koch Arena (6,316); Wichita, KS
November 8, 2026*; 10:00 p.m., The CW		vs. No. 21 USC; Caesars Lake Tahoe Classic	L 86–93	1–1	18 – Gray Jr.	11 – Berg	6 – Frison	Tahoe Blue Event Center (2,845); Stateline, NV
November 11, 2026*; 6:30 p.m.		Friends (NAIA)	W 113–60	2–1	19 – Tied	7 – Williams	5 – Frison	Charles Koch Arena (6,007); Wichita, KS
November 14, 2026*; 6:00 p.m., ESPN+		Austin Peay	W 76–60	3–1	27 – Battie	11 – Battie	9 – Frison	Charles Koch Arena (6,002); Wichita, KS
November 18, 2026*; 7:00 p.m., ESPN+		at Loyola Chicago	W 79–75	4–1	27 – Berg	9 – Berg	7 – Frison	Joseph J. Gentile Arena (2,493); Chicago, IL
November 21, 2026*; 1:00 p.m.		New Mexico						Charles Koch Arena; Wichita, KS
November 23, 2026*; 6:30 p.m.		Texas A&M–Corpus Christi						Charles Koch Arena; Wichita, KS
November 27, 2026*; 8:00 p.m., ESPN2		at Kentucky						Rupp Arena; Lexington, KY
November 30, 2026*; 6:30 p.m.		Southeast Missouri State						Charles Koch Arena; Wichita, KS
December 5, 2026*; 6:00 p.m.		Boise State						Charles Koch Arena; Wichita, KS
December 11, 2026*; 7:30 p.m., TNT		vs. Kansas State						T-Mobile Center; Kansas City, MO
December 14, 2026*; 6:30 p.m.		Cameron (D-II)						Charles Koch Arena; Wichita, KS
December 18, 2026*; 6:30 p.m.		South Carolina State						Charles Koch Arena; Wichita, KS
December 21, 2026*; 6:00 p.m.		Jacksonville State						Charles Koch Arena; Wichita, KS
American regular season
December 31, 2026; 7:00 p.m., ESPNU		North Texas						Charles Koch Arena; Wichita, KS
January 3, 2027; 2:00 p.m., ESPN2 or ESPNU		at Charlotte						Dale F. Halton Arena; Charlotte, NC
January 8, 2027; 8:00 p.m., ESPN2		UAB						Charles Koch Arena; Wichita, KS
January 14, 2027; 6:00 p.m., ESPN2		at Memphis						FedExForum; Memphis, TN
January 17, 2027; 4:00 p.m.		East Carolina						Charles Koch Arena; Wichita, KS
January 20, 2027; 6:00 p.m.		at North Texas						UNT Coliseum; Denton, TX
January 23, 2027; 2:00 p.m.		at Tulsa; Rivalry						Reynolds Center; Tulsa, OK
January 28, 2027; 6:00 p.m., ESPN2		Memphis						Charles Koch Arena; Wichita, KS
January 31, 2027; 1:00 p.m.		UTSA						Charles Koch Arena; Wichita, KS
February 4, 2027; 5:00 p.m., ESPN2		at South Florida						Yuengling Center; Tampa, FL
February 7, 2027; 11:00 a.m., ESPN2 or ESPNU		at Florida Atlantic						Eleanor R. Baldwin Arena; Boca Raton, FL
February 10, 2027; 6:30 p.m.		Tulane						Charles Koch Arena; Wichita, KS
February 14, 2027; 1:00 p.m.		at Rice						Tudor Fieldhouse; Houston, TX
February 18, 2027; 5:00 p.m., ESPN2		South Florida						Charles Koch Arena; Wichita, KS
February 21, 2027; 1:00 p.m.		at Temple						Liacouras Center; Philadelphia, PA
February 28, 2027; 1:00 p.m., ESPNU		Charlotte						Charles Koch Arena; Wichita, KS
March 3, 2027; 6:30 p.m.		at Tulane						Devlin Fieldhouse; New Orleans, LA
March 6, 2027; 6:00 p.m.		Tulsa; Rivalry						Charles Koch Arena; Wichita, KS
American tournament
March 10–14, 2027; TBA		vs. TBD						Yuengling Center; Tampa, FL
*Non-conference game. ^{#}Rankings from AP poll. (#) Tournament seedings in parentheses. All times are in Central Time.
