= 2026–27 North Texas Mean Green men's basketball team =

American college basketball season

2026–27 North Texas Mean Green men's basketball
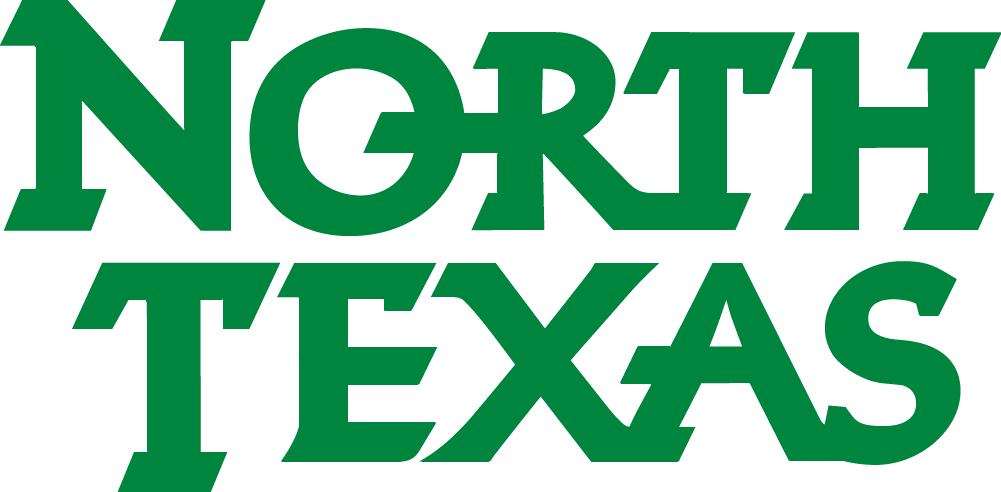
- Conference: American Conference
- Record: 3–1 (0–0 American)
- Head coach: Daniyal Robinson (2nd season)
- Assistant coaches: Kwanza Johnson; Steve Payne; Deshon Parker; Mo Ba; Cole Christian
- Home arena: UNT Coliseum

2026–27 American Conference men's basketball standings
| | Conf. | | | | Overall |
| Team | W | | L | PCT | W | | L | PCT |
|---|---|---|---|---|---|---|---|---|
| Tulsa | 0 | – | 0 | – | 4 | – | 0 | 1.000 |
| East Carolina | 0 | – | 0 | – | 3 | – | 1 | .750 |
| Florida Atlantic | 0 | – | 0 | – | 3 | – | 1 | .750 |
| Memphis | 0 | – | 0 | – | 3 | – | 1 | .750 |
| North Texas | 0 | – | 0 | – | 3 | – | 1 | .750 |
| Wichita State | 0 | – | 0 | – | 3 | – | 1 | .750 |
| Charlotte | 0 | – | 0 | – | 2 | – | 2 | .500 |
| Rice | 0 | – | 0 | – | 2 | – | 2 | .500 |
| South Florida | 0 | – | 0 | – | 2 | – | 2 | .500 |
| Temple | 0 | – | 0 | – | 2 | – | 2 | .500 |
| Tulane | 0 | – | 0 | – | 2 | – | 2 | .500 |
| UAB | 0 | – | 0 | – | 2 | – | 2 | .500 |
| UTSA | 0 | – | 0 | – | 2 | – | 2 | .500 |
† 2027 American tournament winner As of November 17, 2026; Rankings from AP poll

The 2026–27 North Texas Mean Green men's basketball team represents the University of North Texas during the 2026–27 NCAA Division I men's basketball season. The Mean Green, led by second-year head coach Daniyal Robinson, play their home games at UNT Coliseum in Denton, Texas, as a member of the American Conference.

== Previous season ==
The Mean Green finished the 2025–26 season 19–14, 9–9 in American play. As the No. 6 seed in the American tournament, they defeated No. 7 seed Florida Atlantic 74–70 in the second round before losing to No. 3 seed Tulsa 90–84 in triple overtime in the quarterfinals.

== Offseason ==
=== Roster turnover ===
Five players from the 2025–26 team entered the transfer portal in April 2026: Cahmai Crosby, Curtis Stinson Jr., David Terrell Jr., Buddy Hammer Jr. and Will McClendon. Preseason conference player of the year Je'Shawn Stevenson returned, along with Cole Franklin, Reece Robinson, EJ Horton and forward Ousmane Ndour, who joined the program in January 2026.

=== Departures ===
North Texas departures
| Name | Number | Pos. | Height | Weight | Year | Hometown | Reason for Departure |
|---|---|---|---|---|---|---|---|
| Demarion Watson | 0 | G | 6'7" | 215 | Senior | Maple Grove, Minnesota | Graduated |
| Will McClendon | 1 | G | 6'3" | 195 | Senior | Sacramento, California | Transferred to Pepperdine |
| Cahmai Crosby | 2 | G | 6'3" | 198 | Junior | Kansas City, Kansas | Transferred to Omaha |
| David Terrell Jr. | 5 | G | 6'4" | 195 | Junior | Dallas, Texas | Transferred to SMU |
| Josiah Shackleford | 8 | F | 6'9" | 225 | Senior | Greenville, North Carolina | Graduated |
| Curtis Stinson Jr. | 11 | G | 6'5" | 208 | Freshman | Bronx, New York | Transferred to Cleveland State |
| Dylan Arnett | 12 | F | 6'9" | 235 | Senior | Chicago, Illinois | Graduated |
| Buddy Hammer Jr. | 23 | F | 6'7" | 215 | Junior | Westville, Oklahoma | Transferred to Akron |

=== Incoming transfers ===
North Texas incoming transfers
| Name | Number | Pos. | Height | Weight | Year | Hometown | Previous School |
|---|---|---|---|---|---|---|---|
| Cash Chavis | 1 | G | 6'2" | 180 | Junior | Minneapolis, Minnesota | UT Arlington |
| Amar Amkou | 3 | G | 6'8" | 220 | Junior | Thiès, Senegal | Florida Atlantic |
| Braylon Barnes | 5 | G | 6'4" | 185 | Sophomore | Brandon, Mississippi | Jones College |
| Mitchell Holmes | 13 | F | 6'10" | 250 | Junior | Fort Worth, Texas | SMU |

=== 2026 recruiting class ===
North Texas 2026 recruiting class
| Name | Number | Pos. | Height | Weight | Hometown | High school |
|---|---|---|---|---|---|---|
| Marcus Zelee | 0 | G | 6'3" | 190 | Austin, Texas | Austin Prep Academy |
| Filip Kalajzic | 7 | F | 6'10" | – | Omiš, Croatia | Šenčur Gorenjska (Slovenia) |
| Aeneas Alexander | 11 | G | 6'7" | 220 | McKinney, Texas | Pace Academy |
| TJ Crumble | 24 | F | 6'8" | 214 | Cleveland, Ohio | Long Island Lutheran |

== Preseason ==
On October 9, 2026, the American Conference released its preseason coaches' poll. North Texas was picked to finish seventh in the conference, and Je'Shawn Stevenson was named the preseason conference player of the year and to the preseason all-conference first team.

=== Preseason rankings ===
American Conference Preseason Poll
| Place | Team | Votes |
|---|---|---|
| 1 | Wichita State | 140 (9) |
| 2 | Memphis | 131 (4) |
| 3 | South Florida | 118 |
| 4 | Tulsa | 99 |
| 5 | Charlotte | 95 |
| 6 | UAB | 89 |
| 7 | North Texas | 84 |
| 8 | Florida Atlantic | 75 |
| 9 | Temple | 61 |
| 10 | Tulane | 52 |
| 11 | East Carolina | 34 |
| 12 | Rice | 22 |
| 13 | UTSA | 14 |
(#) first-place votes

=== Preseason All-American Conference Teams ===
Preseason All-American Conference Teams
| Team | Player | Year | Position |
|---|---|---|---|
| First | Je'Shawn Stevenson | Junior | Guard |

== Roster ==
2026–27 North Texas Mean Green men's basketball team
Players
Coaches

| Pos. | # | Name | Height | Weight | Year | Previous school | Hometown |
|---|---|---|---|---|---|---|---|
| G | 0 | Marcus Zelee | 6 ft 3 in (1.91 m) | 190 lb (86 kg) | Fr | Austin Prep Academy | Austin, Texas |
| G | 1 | Cash Chavis | 6 ft 2 in (1.88 m) | 180 lb (82 kg) | Jr | UT Arlington | Minneapolis, Minnesota |
| G | 2 | EJ Horton | 6 ft 3 in (1.91 m) | 187 lb (85 kg) | So | Orangeville Academy | Chicago, Illinois |
| G | 3 | Amar Amkou | 6 ft 8 in (2.03 m) | 220 lb (100 kg) | Jr | Florida Atlantic | Thiès, Senegal |
| G | 4 | Je'Shawn Stevenson | 6 ft 3 in (1.91 m) | 200 lb (91 kg) | Jr | Cleveland State | Chicago, Illinois |
| G | 5 | Braylon Barnes | 6 ft 4 in (1.93 m) | 185 lb (84 kg) | So | Jones College | Brandon, Mississippi |
| F | 7 | Filip Kalajzic | 6 ft 10 in (2.08 m) | — | Fr | Šenčur Gorenjska (Slovenia) | Omiš, Croatia |
| G | 10 | Cole Franklin | 6 ft 4 in (1.93 m) | 203 lb (92 kg) | Sr | Cleveland State | DeSoto, Texas |
| G | 11 | Aeneas Alexander | 6 ft 7 in (2.01 m) | 220 lb (100 kg) | Fr | Pace Academy | McKinney, Texas |
| F | 13 | Mitchell Holmes | 6 ft 10 in (2.08 m) | 250 lb (113 kg) | Jr | SMU | Fort Worth, Texas |
| F | 15 | Reece Robinson | 6 ft 8 in (2.03 m) | 232 lb (105 kg) | Jr | Cleveland State | Cleveland, Ohio |
| F | 24 | TJ Crumble | 6 ft 8 in (2.03 m) | 214 lb (97 kg) | Fr | Long Island Lutheran | Cleveland, Ohio |
| F | 35 | Ousmane Ndour | 6 ft 10 in (2.08 m) | 229 lb (104 kg) | So | CB Benicarló (Spain) | Mbacké, Senegal |

Head coach

- Daniyal Robinson (Little Rock)

Assistant coach(es)

- Kwanza Johnson (Tulsa)
- Steve Payne (Union)
- Deshon Parker (Cleveland State)
- Mo Ba (Eastern Michigan)
- Cole Christian

Legend

- (C) Team captain
- (S) Suspended
- (I) Ineligible
- (W) Walk-on
- Injured
- Current redshirt

Roster
Last update: November 8, 2026

== Schedule and results ==
| Date time, TV | Rank^{#} | Opponent^{#} | Result | Record | High points | High rebounds | High assists | Site (attendance) city, state |
Exhibition
| October 18, 2026*; 2:00 p.m. | | vs. Colorado | L 64–67 | – | 17 – Chavis | 5 – Stevenson | 3 – Tied | Auraria Events Center (658); Denver, CO |
| October 26, 2026*; 7:00 p.m. | | Northwestern State | L 60–62 | – | 16 – Stevenson | 12 – Robinson | 5 – Stevenson | UNT Coliseum; Denton, TX |
Non-conference regular season
| November 2, 2026*; 7:30 p.m., ESPN+ | | Southwestern Christian (NAIA) | W 122–50 | 1–0 | 22 – Alexander | 9 – Tied | 5 – Stevenson | UNT Coliseum (2,673); Denton, TX |
| November 5, 2026*; 4:00 p.m., ESPN+ | | McNeese | W 77–67 | 2–0 | 30 – Stevenson | 8 – Ndour | 5 – Stevenson | UNT Coliseum (2,689); Denton, TX |
| November 11, 2026*; 7:00 p.m., ESPN+ | | Santa Clara | L 71–76 | 2–1 | 18 – Ndour | 6 – Franklin | 4 – Stevenson | UNT Coliseum (3,689); Denton, TX |
| November 14, 2026*; 5:00 p.m., ESPN+ | | South Alabama | W 66–65 | 3–1 | 26 – Stevenson | 13 – Robinson | 8 – Chavis | UNT Coliseum (2,328); Denton, TX |
| November 20, 2026*; 5:30 p.m., ESPN+ | | at Appalachian State | | | | | | Holmes Center; Boone, NC |
| November 27, 2026*; 7:00 p.m., YouTube | | vs. North Dakota State; Snake River Invitational | | | | | | Mountain America Center; Idaho Falls, ID |
| November 28, 2026*; 2:30 p.m., USA Network | | vs. Boise State; Snake River Invitational | | | | | | Mountain America Center; Idaho Falls, ID |
| November 29, 2026*; 5:30 p.m., YouTube | | vs. Drake; Snake River Invitational | | | | | | Mountain America Center; Idaho Falls, ID |
| December 4, 2026*; 7:00 p.m., ESPN+ | | Bradley | | | | | | UNT Coliseum; Denton, TX |
| December 6, 2026*; 3:00 p.m., ESPN+ | | Mississippi Valley State | | | | | | UNT Coliseum; Denton, TX |
| December 13, 2026*; 4:30 p.m., ESPN2 | | vs. Texas State; Coast to Coast Challenge | | | | | | Ariat Arena; Fort Worth, TX |
| December 16, 2026*; 7:00 p.m., ESPN+ | | Winthrop | | | | | | UNT Coliseum; Denton, TX |
| December 20, 2026*; 3:00 p.m., ESPN+ | | Bethune–Cookman | | | | | | UNT Coliseum; Denton, TX |
| December 22, 2026*; 1:00 p.m., ESPN+ | | Southwest (NM) (NAIA) | | | | | | UNT Coliseum; Denton, TX |
American regular season
| December 31, 2026; 8:00 p.m., ESPNU | | at Wichita State | | | | | | Charles Koch Arena; Wichita, KS |
| January 6, 2027; 7:00 p.m., ESPN+ | | Florida Atlantic | | | | | | UNT Coliseum; Denton, TX |
| January 10, 2027; 5:00 p.m., ESPNU | | at Rice | | | | | | Tudor Fieldhouse; Houston, TX |
| January 14, 2027; 7:00 p.m., ESPN+ | | Tulane | | | | | | UNT Coliseum; Denton, TX |
| January 17, 2027; 3:00 p.m., ESPN2 | | Charlotte | | | | | | UNT Coliseum; Denton, TX |
| January 20, 2027; 7:00 p.m., ESPN+ | | Wichita State | | | | | | UNT Coliseum; Denton, TX |
| January 23, 2027; 2:00 p.m., ESPN+ | | at Memphis | | | | | | FedExForum; Memphis, TN |
| January 28, 2027; 8:00 p.m., ESPN+ | | at UTSA | | | | | | Convocation Center; San Antonio, TX |
| January 31, 2027; 3:00 p.m., ESPN+ | | Tulsa | | | | | | UNT Coliseum; Denton, TX |
| February 3, 2027; 7:00 p.m., ESPN+ | | Temple | | | | | | UNT Coliseum; Denton, TX |
| February 11, 2027; 7:30 p.m., ESPN+ | | at UAB | | | | | | Bartow Arena; Birmingham, AL |
| February 14, 2027; 2:00 p.m., ESPN+ | | at Tulsa | | | | | | Reynolds Center; Tulsa, OK |
| February 17, 2027; 7:00 p.m., ESPN+ | | Memphis | | | | | | UNT Coliseum; Denton, TX |
| February 21, 2027; 2:00 p.m., ESPNU | | at Florida Atlantic | | | | | | Eleanor R. Baldwin Arena; Boca Raton, FL |
| February 24, 2027; 7:00 p.m., ESPN+ | | at South Florida | | | | | | Yuengling Center; Tampa, FL |
| February 27, 2027; 5:00 p.m., ESPN+ | | UTSA | | | | | | UNT Coliseum; Denton, TX |
| March 2, 2027; 7:00 p.m., ESPN+ | | at East Carolina | | | | | | Williams Arena at Minges Coliseum; Greenville, NC |
| March 7, 2027; 3:00 p.m., ESPN+ | | Rice | | | | | | UNT Coliseum; Denton, TX |
American tournament
| March 10–14, 2027; TBA | | vs. TBD | | | | | | Yuengling Center; Tampa, FL |
*Non-conference game. ^{#}Rankings from AP poll. (#) Tournament seedings in parentheses. All times are in Central Time.
