= Adam Fisher (basketball) =

American basketball coach

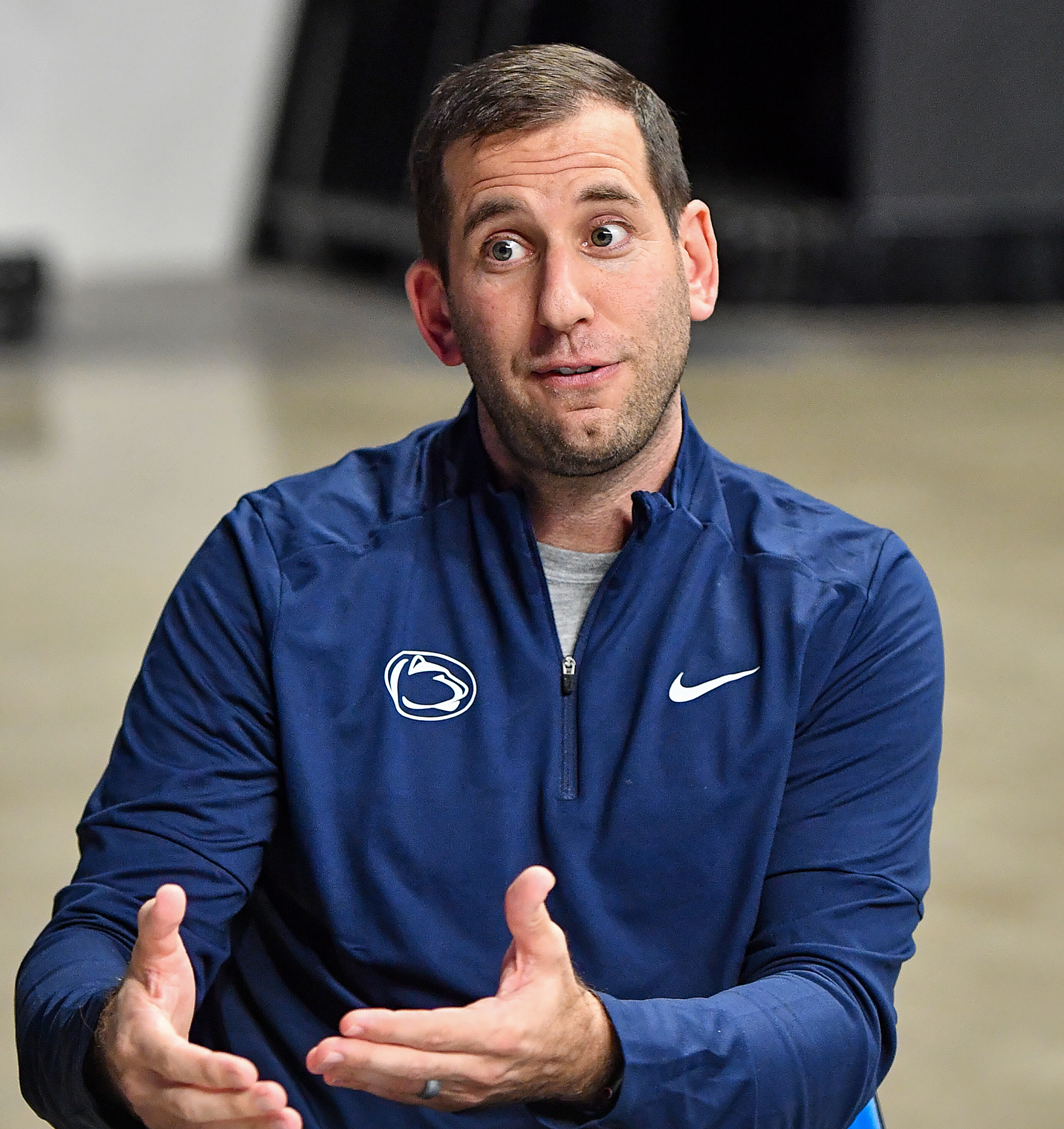
- Fisher in 2022

Current position
- Title: Head coach
- Team: Temple
- Conference: The American
- Record: 52–53 (.495)

Biographical details
- Born: August 26, 1983 (age 43); Jamison, Pennsylvania, U.S.
- Education: Penn State (2006)

Coaching career (HC unless noted)
- 2007–2009: Villanova (GA)
- 2015–2021: Miami (FL) (assistant)
- 2021–2023: Penn State (AHC)
- 2023–present: Temple

Administrative career (AD unless noted)
- 2009–2010: Boston Univ. (Director of Operations)
- 2011–2012: Penn State (Video Coordinator)
- 2012–2013: Penn State (Director of Player Personnel)
- 2013–2015: Miami (FL) (Director of Operations)

Head coaching record
- Overall: 52–53 (.495)
Medal record
Basketball
Representing United States
Maccabiah Games
Silver medal – second place	2000 Maccabiah Games	Junior Basketball

Adam Fisher (born August 26, 1983) is an American basketball coach who is the current head coach of the Temple Owls men's basketball team. Prior to Temple, he was an assistant at Penn State and Miami.

== Early life and education ==
Fisher is a native of Jamison, Pennsylvania, a suburb of Philadelphia, and is Jewish. He played high school basketball at Central Bucks East High School in Doylestown under Derek Wright, the brother of legendary Villanova men's basketball coach, Jay Wright. A defensive specialist on the basketball court, Fisher always aimed to enter the world of coaching. Fisher also played in the 2000 Junior Maccabiah Games and helped lead the Philadelphia team to the silver medal.

== Early career ==
Fisher began his career while getting a bachelor's degree in kinesiology in 2006 at Penn State, when he became the head student manager for the basketball team. He then became a graduate manager.

Fisher moved to Villanova and worked under Jay Wright as a graduate manager, getting a master's degree in education leadership. During that time, the Wildcats reached the Final Four.

Fisher then joined Pat Chambers as the director of basketball operations at Boston University, helping the Terriers to back-to-back 21-win seasons and a win in the 2011 America East Conference Championship.

Fisher left Boston to return to Happy Valley, serving as the video coordinator under Ed DeChellis before being promoted to director of player development, reuniting with his old boss Pat Chambers.

In 2013, Fisher moved to Miami, where he served as the director of operations for Jim Larranaga's Hurricanes where they advanced to the NIT Championship, and were ranked by AP and USA Today in the Top 10.

== Coaching career ==
=== Miami ===
Jim Larrañaga promoted Fisher to a bench role after his two years as director of operations. He served as the team's offensive coordinator, helping them reach the NCAA Tournament in all his first three seasons there. They also had three straight 20-win campaigns. He recruited the likes of Lonnie Walker IV, Isaiah Wong, and Bruce Brown, having a top-15 recruiting class in back-to-back seasons.

=== Penn State ===
Fisher then was hired by Micah Shrewsberry, returning to his alma mater as the associate head coach and the team's offensive coordinator. They had a major postseason run in the Big Ten Tournament in their first season before finishing as the runner-up in the tournament in their second season. Fisher also served as a major part of their recruiting mission, with the highest-ranked class in Penn State history in 2021 and having a top-30 class nationally in 2022. He also was in TopConnect 2021, a national networking program for top assistant coaches in the nation.

=== Temple ===
On March 29, 2023, Temple Athletic Director Arthur Johnson announced that Fisher had been hired as the 19th head coach of Temple Owls men's basketball.

== Head coaching record ==
Record table
Season	Team	Overall	Conference	Standing	Postseason
Temple Owls (American Athletic Conference) (2023–present)
2023–24	Temple	16–20	5–13	T–10th	
2024–25	Temple	17–15	9–9	7th	
2025–26	Temple	16–16	8–10	T–8th	
2026–27	Temple	3–2	0–0		
Temple:		52–53 (.495)	22–32 (.407)		
Total:		52–53 (.495)			
National champion Postseason invitational champion Conference regular season champion Conference regular season and conference tournament champion Division regular season champion Division regular season and conference tournament champion Conference tournament champion
