= 2026–27 Rice Owls men's basketball team =

American college basketball season

2026–27 Rice Owls men's basketball
- Conference: American Conference
- Record: 1–2 (0–0 American)
- Head coach: Rob Lanier (3rd season)
- Associate head coach: Josten Crow
- Assistant coaches: Andre Owens; Jordan Glover; Mike Jones; Tyler Dawson
- Home arena: Tudor Fieldhouse

2026–27 American Conference men's basketball standings
| | Conf. | | | | Overall |
| Team | W | | L | PCT | W | | L | PCT |
|---|---|---|---|---|---|---|---|---|
| Tulsa | 0 | – | 0 | – | 3 | – | 0 | 1.000 |
| Charlotte | 0 | – | 0 | – | 2 | – | 1 | .667 |
| East Carolina | 0 | – | 0 | – | 2 | – | 1 | .667 |
| Florida Atlantic | 0 | – | 0 | – | 2 | – | 1 | .667 |
| Memphis | 0 | – | 0 | – | 2 | – | 1 | .667 |
| North Texas | 0 | – | 0 | – | 2 | – | 1 | .667 |
| Tulane | 0 | – | 0 | – | 2 | – | 1 | .667 |
| UTSA | 0 | – | 0 | – | 2 | – | 1 | .667 |
| Wichita State | 0 | – | 0 | – | 2 | – | 1 | .667 |
| UAB | 0 | – | 0 | – | 2 | – | 1 | .667 |
| Rice | 0 | – | 0 | – | 1 | – | 2 | .333 |
| South Florida | 0 | – | 0 | – | 1 | – | 2 | .333 |
| Temple | 0 | – | 0 | – | 1 | – | 2 | .333 |
† 2027 American tournament winner As of November 13, 2026; Rankings from AP poll

The 2026–27 Rice Owls men's basketball team represents Rice University during the 2026–27 NCAA Division I men's basketball season. The Owls, led by third-year head coach Rob Lanier, play their home games at Tudor Fieldhouse in Houston, Texas, as a member of the American Conference.

== Previous season ==
The Owls finished the 2025–26 season 13–18, 7–11 in American play, to finish in 11th place. Only the top ten teams qualified for the American tournament, so Rice's season ended with an 80–71 Senior Day win over UTSA on March 8, 2026.

== Offseason ==
=== Coaching changes ===
Associate head coach Chris Kreider left in April 2026 to become an assistant coach at Georgia Tech, ending his second stint at Rice. Lanier then promoted Josten Crow to associate head coach and graduate assistant Tyler Dawson to assistant coach. On August 14, 2026, Rice hired former UNC Greensboro and Radford head coach Mike Jones as an assistant coach.

=== Roster turnover ===
Ten players from the 2025–26 team did not return, including leading scorers Trae Broadnax and Nick Anderson. Jalen Smith, the team's third-leading scorer, signed a professional contract with BC Prievidza of the Slovak Basketball League. Guard Aaron Powell, who redshirted in 2025–26, transferred to Weber State, and guard Jordan Williams joined the Maryland football team.

Rice's nine newcomers were four transfers, four freshmen and sophomore guard Rohan Amin. Guard Jacob Dar, who averaged 7.5 points per game for Rice in 2024–25, returned to the program after a season at Seton Hall. When the team opened practice on September 21, 2026, it had seven returning letterwinners and nine newcomers.

=== Departures ===
Rice departures
| Name | Number | Pos. | Height | Weight | Year | Hometown | Reason for Departure |
|---|---|---|---|---|---|---|---|
| Jalen Smith | 2 | G | 6'4" | 195 | RS Senior | Orlando, Florida | Graduated; signed with BC Prievidza |
| Trey Patterson | 3 | F | 6'9" | 225 | Graduate student | Somerset, New Jersey | Graduated |
| Jordan Williams | 5 | G | 6'2" | 215 | RS Junior | Houston, Texas | Joined Maryland football |
| Aaron Powell | 11 | G | 6'1" | 185 | Sophomore | Los Angeles, California | Transferred to Weber State |
| Trae Broadnax | 12 | G | 6'4" | 200 | Graduate student | Savannah, Georgia | Graduated |
| Andrew Akuchie | 13 | F | 6'11" | 215 | Senior | Fort Lauderdale, Florida | Graduated |
| Presley Patterson | 14 | G | 5'11" | 180 | Senior | Knoxville, Tennessee | Graduated |
| Nick Anderson | 23 | G/F | 6'3" | 195 | Senior | Houston, Texas | Graduated |
| George Perkins | 30 | F | 6'8" | 200 | RS Junior | Washington, D.C. | Left the program |
| Stephen Giwa | 32 | C | 6'9" | 245 | RS Senior | Houston, Texas | Graduated |

=== Incoming transfers ===
Rice incoming transfers
| Name | Number | Pos. | Height | Weight | Year | Hometown | Previous School |
|---|---|---|---|---|---|---|---|
| Kaiden Myers | 4 | G | 6'3" | 200 | Junior | McKinney, Texas | Kilgore College |
| Jacob Dar | 5 | G/F | 6'7" | 190 | Graduate student | Omaha, Nebraska | Seton Hall |
| Carmelo Adkins | 14 | G | 6'4" | 200 | Junior | Lubbock, Texas | USC Upstate |
| Jarne Elouna Eyenga | 25 | F | 6'10" | 230 | Sophomore | Keerbergen, Belgium | Charlotte |

=== 2026 recruiting class ===
Rice 2026 recruiting class
| Name | Number | Pos. | Height | Weight | Hometown | High school |
|---|---|---|---|---|---|---|
| Jaxson Thompson | 2 | G | 6'2" | 185 | Dallas, Texas | Greenhill School |
| Zalan Flasar | 3 | F | 6'9" | 230 | Sopron, Hungary | Sopron KC |
| Alexander Leeth | 6 | F | 6'7" | 210 | Knoxville, Tennessee | Webb School of Knoxville |
| Tristan Vukotic | 23 | G | 6'7" | 195 | Zgornja Kungota, Slovenia | Ilirija |

== Preseason ==
On October 9, 2026, the American Conference released its preseason coaches' poll. Rice was picked to finish 12th in the 13-team conference, and no Rice players were named to the preseason all-conference teams.

=== Preseason rankings ===
American Conference Preseason Poll
| Place | Team | Votes |
|---|---|---|
| 1 | Wichita State | 140 (9) |
| 2 | Memphis | 131 (4) |
| 3 | South Florida | 118 |
| 4 | Tulsa | 99 |
| 5 | Charlotte | 95 |
| 6 | UAB | 89 |
| 7 | North Texas | 84 |
| 8 | Florida Atlantic | 75 |
| 9 | Temple | 61 |
| 10 | Tulane | 52 |
| 11 | East Carolina | 34 |
| 12 | Rice | 22 |
| 13 | UTSA | 14 |
(#) first-place votes

== Roster ==
2026–27 Rice Owls men's basketball team
Players
Coaches

| Pos. | # | Name | Height | Weight | Year | Previous school | Hometown |
|---|---|---|---|---|---|---|---|
| G | 0 | Dallas Hobbs | 6 ft 0 in (1.83 m) | 170 lb (77 kg) | Sr | Mount St. Mary's | Dallas, Texas |
| G | 1 | Cam Carroll | 6 ft 3 in (1.91 m) | 190 lb (86 kg) | So | South Grand Prairie HS | Grand Prairie, Texas |
| G | 2 | Jaxson Thompson | 6 ft 2 in (1.88 m) | 185 lb (84 kg) | Fr | Greenhill School | Dallas, Texas |
| F | 3 | Zalan Flasar | 6 ft 9 in (2.06 m) | 230 lb (104 kg) | Fr | Sopron KC | Sopron, Hungary |
| G | 4 | Kaiden Myers | 6 ft 3 in (1.91 m) | 200 lb (91 kg) | Jr | Kilgore College | McKinney, Texas |
| G/F | 5 | Jacob Dar | 6 ft 7 in (2.01 m) | 190 lb (86 kg) | | Seton Hall | Omaha, Nebraska |
| F | 6 | Alexander Leeth | 6 ft 7 in (2.01 m) | 210 lb (95 kg) | Fr | Webb School of Knoxville | Knoxville, Tennessee |
| G | 7 | Bodey Howell | 6 ft 4 in (1.93 m) | 200 lb (91 kg) | So | Owyhee HS | Meridian, Idaho |
| F | 8 | Eternity Eguagie | 6 ft 7 in (2.01 m) | 210 lb (95 kg) | Jr | Colby CC | Edmonton, Alberta, Canada |
| G | 10 | Cole Andrews-Heitz | 6 ft 0 in (1.83 m) | 180 lb (82 kg) | Sr | Rouse High School | Leander, Texas |
| G | 14 | Carmelo Adkins | 6 ft 4 in (1.93 m) | 200 lb (91 kg) | Jr | USC Upstate | Lubbock, Texas |
| F | 21 | Evan Cochran | 6 ft 10 in (2.08 m) | 225 lb (102 kg) | So | The Village School | Houston, Texas |
| G | 23 | Tristan Vukotic | 6 ft 7 in (2.01 m) | 195 lb (88 kg) | Fr | Ilirija | Zgornja Kungota, Slovenia |
| F | 24 | Jimmy Oladokun Jr. | 6 ft 9 in (2.06 m) | 230 lb (104 kg) | Sr | San Diego | Los Angeles, California |
| F | 25 | Jarne Elouna Eyenga | 6 ft 10 in (2.08 m) | 230 lb (104 kg) | So | Charlotte | Keerbergen, Belgium |
| G | 30 | Rohan Amin | 6 ft 0 in (1.83 m) | 150 lb (68 kg) | So | Harvard-Westlake | Los Angeles, California |

Head coach

- Rob Lanier (St. Bonaventure)

Assistant coach(es)

- Josten Crow (associate head coach)
- Andre Owens
- Jordan Glover
- Mike Jones (Howard)
- Tyler Dawson

Legend

- (C) Team captain
- (S) Suspended
- (I) Ineligible
- (W) Walk-on
- Injured
- Current redshirt

Roster
Last update: November 13, 2026

== Schedule and results ==
| Date time, TV | Rank^{#} | Opponent^{#} | Result | Record | High points | High rebounds | High assists | Site (attendance) city, state |
Non-conference regular season
| November 2, 2026*; 5:30 p.m., ESPN+ | | Dallas Christian | W 100–55 | 1–0 | 20 – Dar | 8 – Tied | 7 – Hobbs | Tudor Fieldhouse (589); Houston, TX |
| November 5, 2026*; 7:00 p.m., ESPN+ | | East Texas A&M | L 71–72 | 1–1 | 14 – Thompson | 8 – Oladokun | 6 – Hobbs | Tudor Fieldhouse (719); Houston, TX |
| November 9, 2026*; 9:00 p.m., ACCNX | | at Stanford | L 73–91 | 1–2 | 14 – Thompson | 6 – Flasar | 2 – Tied | Maples Pavilion (1,763); Stanford, CA |
| November 14, 2026*; 1:00 p.m., ESPN+ | | at Stephen F. Austin | | | | | | William R. Johnson Coliseum; Nacogdoches, TX |
| November 17, 2026*; 7:00 p.m., ESPN+ | | Texas A&M–Corpus Christi | | | | | | Tudor Fieldhouse; Houston, TX |
| November 22, 2026*; 4:00 p.m. | | vs. Lamar; Scout Jacksonville Classic | | | | | | Florida State College at Jacksonville; Jacksonville, FL |
| November 24, 2026*; 12:30 p.m. | | vs. UIC; Scout Jacksonville Classic | | | | | | Florida State College at Jacksonville; Jacksonville, FL |
| November 25, 2026*; 10:00 a.m. | | vs. Ohio; Scout Jacksonville Classic | | | | | | Florida State College at Jacksonville; Jacksonville, FL |
| November 29, 2026*; 1:00 p.m., ESPN+ | | at Arkansas State | | | | | | First National Bank Arena; Jonesboro, AR |
| December 4, 2026*; 7:00 p.m., ESPN+ | | Sam Houston | | | | | | Tudor Fieldhouse; Houston, TX |
| December 10, 2026*; 7:00 p.m., ESPN+ | | Nicholls | | | | | | Tudor Fieldhouse; Houston, TX |
| December 16, 2026*; 11:00 a.m., ESPN+ | | College of Biblical Studies | | | | | | Tudor Fieldhouse; Houston, TX |
| December 19, 2026*; 2:00 p.m., ESPN+ | | at Denver | | | | | | Hamilton Gymnasium; Denver, CO |
| December 22, 2026*; 1:00 p.m., ESPN+ | | Texas Southern | | | | | | Tudor Fieldhouse; Houston, TX |
American regular season
| December 30, 2026; 1:00 p.m., ESPN+ | | Temple | | | | | | Tudor Fieldhouse; Houston, TX |
| January 3, 2027; 4:00 p.m., ESPNU | | at Tulane | | | | | | Devlin Fieldhouse; New Orleans, LA |
| January 6, 2027; 7:00 p.m., ESPN+ | | at Memphis | | | | | | FedExForum; Memphis, TN |
| January 10, 2027; 4:00 p.m., ESPNU | | North Texas | | | | | | Tudor Fieldhouse; Houston, TX |
| January 17, 2027; 1:00 p.m., ESPN+ | | at Temple | | | | | | Liacouras Center; Philadelphia, PA |
| January 20, 2027; 7:00 p.m., ESPN+ | | UTSA | | | | | | Tudor Fieldhouse; Houston, TX |
| January 23, 2027; 1:00 p.m., ESPN+ | | at Florida Atlantic | | | | | | Eleanor R. Baldwin Arena; Boca Raton, FL |
| January 26, 2027; 8:00 p.m., ESPNU | | at South Florida | | | | | | Yuengling Center; Tampa, FL |
| January 30, 2027; 1:00 p.m., ESPN+ | | Tulane | | | | | | Tudor Fieldhouse; Houston, TX |
| February 4, 2027; 7:00 p.m., ESPN+ | | East Carolina | | | | | | Tudor Fieldhouse; Houston, TX |
| February 7, 2027; 1:00 p.m., ESPN+ | | at UTSA | | | | | | Convocation Center; San Antonio, TX |
| February 11, 2027; 7:00 p.m., ESPN+ | | Tulsa | | | | | | Tudor Fieldhouse; Houston, TX |
| February 14, 2027; 1:00 p.m., ESPN+ | | Wichita State | | | | | | Tudor Fieldhouse; Houston, TX |
| February 17, 2027; 6:00 p.m., ESPN+ | | at East Carolina | | | | | | Minges Coliseum; Greenville, NC |
| February 20, 2027; 4:00 p.m., ESPN+ | | at Charlotte | | | | | | Halton Arena; Charlotte, NC |
| February 25, 2027; 7:00 p.m., ESPN+ | | UAB | | | | | | Tudor Fieldhouse; Houston, TX |
| February 28, 2027; 1:00 p.m., ESPN+ | | Florida Atlantic | | | | | | Tudor Fieldhouse; Houston, TX |
| March 7, 2027; 3:00 p.m., ESPN+ | | at North Texas | | | | | | The Super Pit; Denton, TX |
American tournament
| March 10–14, 2027; TBA | | vs. TBD | | | | | | Yuengling Center; Tampa, FL |
*Non-conference game. ^{#}Rankings from AP poll. (#) Tournament seedings in parentheses. All times are in Central Time.
