= 2026–27 Dayton Flyers men's basketball team =

American college basketball season

2026–27 Dayton Flyers men's basketball
- Conference: Atlantic 10 Conference
- Record: 3–3 (0–0 A–10)
- Head coach: Anthony Grant (10th season)
- Assistant coaches: James Kane; Jermaine Henderson; Sean Damaska; Nick Irvin; Jordan Talley
- Home arena: UD Arena

2026–27 Atlantic 10 men's basketball standings
	Conf.				Overall
Team	W		L	PCT	W		L	PCT
Duquesne	0	–	0	–	5	–	0	1.000
Saint Joseph's	0	–	0	–	5	–	0	1.000
George Washington	0	–	0	–	5	–	1	.833
Rhode Island	0	–	0	–	5	–	1	.833
Fordham	0	–	0	–	4	–	1	.800
George Mason	0	–	0	–	4	–	1	.800
St. Bonaventure	0	–	0	–	4	–	1	.800
Saint Louis	0	–	0	–	3	–	1	.750
VCU	0	–	0	–	3	–	1	.750
Davidson	0	–	0	–	3	–	2	.600
Loyola Chicago	0	–	0	–	3	–	2	.600
Richmond	0	–	0	–	3	–	2	.600
Dayton	0	–	0	–	2	–	3	.400
La Salle	0	–	0	–	2	–	3	.400
† 2027 A-10 tournament winner As of November 21, 2026; Rankings from AP poll

The 2026–27 Dayton Flyers men's basketball team represents the University of Dayton during the 2026–27 NCAA Division I men's basketball season. The Flyers, led by tenth-year head coach Anthony Grant, play their home games at UD Arena in Dayton, Ohio, as a member of the Atlantic 10 Conference.

== Previous season ==
The Flyers finished the 2025–26 season 25–12, 12–6 in A-10 play. As the No. 4 seed in the A-10 tournament, they defeated St. Bonaventure and top-seeded Saint Louis before losing to VCU 70–62 in the championship game. As a No. 2 seed in the NIT, they defeated Bradley and UNC Wilmington before losing to Illinois State 61–55 at home in the quarterfinals.

== Offseason ==
=== Coaching staff ===
Associate head coach Ricardo Greer, the only assistant to work on all nine of Grant's Dayton staffs, left in April 2026 to become associate head coach at Pittsburgh. On May 14, Dayton promoted James Kane to associate head coach and hired Nick Irvin, an assistant at Arizona State for the previous four seasons, and Jordan Talley, who spent 2025–26 as an assistant at Duquesne.

=== Departures ===
Dayton departures
Name	Number	Pos.	Height	Weight	Year	Hometown	Reason for Departure
Javon Bennett	0	G	5'10"	165	Senior	Orlando, Florida	Graduated
De'Shayne Montgomery	2	G	6'4"	200	Junior	Fort Lauderdale, Florida	Entered transfer portal
Jordan Derkack	4	G	6'5"	220	Senior	Colonia, New Jersey	Graduated
Adam Njie Jr.	5	G	6'2"	175	Sophomore	Bronx, New York	Left the team
Keonte Jones	7	F	6'6"	203	Graduate Student	Madison, Wisconsin	Graduated
Bryce Heard	10	G	6'6"	205	Sophomore	Chicago, Illinois	Transferred to Wichita State
Jacob Conner	24	F	6'10"	225	Senior	Dayton, Ohio	Graduated
Sean Pouedet	50	G	6'2"	190	Freshman	Machelen, Belgium	Entered transfer portal

=== Incoming transfers ===
Dayton incoming transfers
Name	Number	Pos.	Height	Weight	Year	Hometown	Previous School
Grant Randall	2	F	6'9"	213	Junior	Queens, New York	Quinnipiac
Tristian Ford	5	G	6'3"	178	Sophomore	Rockford, Illinois	Murray State
Landen Joseph	6	G	6'2"	175	Sophomore	West Palm Beach, Florida	Marshall
Zaide Lowery	7	G	6'5"	205	Senior	Springfield, Missouri	Marquette
Jalen Haynes	9	F	6'8"	245	Graduate Student	Fort Lauderdale, Florida	Cincinnati
Travis Perry	11	G	6'1"	184	Junior	Eddyville, Kentucky	Ole Miss

=== 2026 recruiting class ===
Dayton 2026 recruiting class
Name	Number	Pos.	Height	Weight	Hometown	High school
Aiden Derkack	4	G	6'6"	193	Colonia, New Jersey	SPIRE Institute
Cody Peck	10	F	6'10"	220	Charlotte, North Carolina	Davidson Day School
Julian Washington	14	G	6'4"	190	Castalia, Ohio	Margaretta High School

== Preseason ==
On October 19, 2026, the Atlantic 10 Conference released its preseason poll. Dayton was picked to finish third in the conference, receiving two first-place votes, and Amaël L'Etang was named to the preseason All-A-10 first team.

=== Preseason rankings ===
Atlantic 10 Preseason Poll
Place	Team	Votes
1	VCU	308 (11)
2	Saint Louis	307 (10)
3	Dayton	279 (2)
4	George Mason	240
5	George Washington	207
6	Saint Joseph's	181
7	Fordham	169
8	Davidson	144
9	Richmond	138
10	Duquesne	130
11	Loyola Chicago	116
12	Rhode Island	104
13	La Salle	59
14	St. Bonaventure	33
(#) first-place votes

=== Preseason All-Atlantic 10 Teams ===
Preseason All-Atlantic 10 Teams
Team	Player	Year	Position
First	Amaël L'Etang	Junior	Forward

== Roster ==
2026–27 Dayton Flyers men's basketball team
Players
Coaches

Pos.	#	Name	Height	Weight	Year	Previous school	Hometown
G	0	Evan Dickey (W)	6 ft 3 in (1.91 m)	185 lb (84 kg)	Sr	Chaminade Julienne High School	Dayton, Ohio
F	1	Malcolm Thomas	6 ft 9 in (2.06 m)	225 lb (102 kg)	Jr	DeMatha	Mitchellville, Maryland
F	2	Grant Randall	6 ft 9 in (2.06 m)	213 lb (97 kg)	Jr	Quinnipiac	Queens, New York
F	3	Jaiun Simon	6 ft 6 in (1.98 m)	235 lb (107 kg)	Sr	Pebblebrook High School	Mableton, Georgia
G	4	Aiden Derkack	6 ft 6 in (1.98 m)	193 lb (88 kg)	Fr	SPIRE Institute	Colonia, New Jersey
G	5	Tristian Ford	6 ft 3 in (1.91 m)	178 lb (81 kg)	So	Murray State	Rockford, Illinois
G	6	Landen Joseph	6 ft 2 in (1.88 m)	175 lb (79 kg)	So	Marshall	West Palm Beach, Florida
G	7	Zaide Lowery	6 ft 5 in (1.96 m)	205 lb (93 kg)	Sr	Marquette	Springfield, Missouri
G	8	Jaron McKie	6 ft 3 in (1.91 m)	182 lb (83 kg)	So	St. Joseph's Prep	Gladwyne, Pennsylvania
F	9	Jalen Haynes	6 ft 8 in (2.03 m)	245 lb (111 kg)	GS	Cincinnati	Fort Lauderdale, Florida
F	10	Cody Peck	6 ft 10 in (2.08 m)	220 lb (100 kg)	Fr	Davidson Day School	Charlotte, North Carolina
G	11	Travis Perry	6 ft 1 in (1.85 m)	184 lb (83 kg)	Jr	Ole Miss	Eddyville, Kentucky
G	14	Julian Washington	6 ft 4 in (1.93 m)	190 lb (86 kg)	Fr	Margaretta High School	Castalia, Ohio
F	22	Damon Friery	6 ft 9 in (2.06 m)	218 lb (99 kg)	So	St. Ignatius	Cleveland, Ohio
G	25	Will Maxwell (W)	6 ft 4 in (1.93 m)	220 lb (100 kg)	Sr	Oakwood High School	Oakwood, Ohio
F	29	Amaël L'Etang	7 ft 1 in (2.16 m)	242 lb (110 kg)	Jr	Cholet	Bastia, France
G	33	Makai Grant (W)	6 ft 1 in (1.85 m)	204 lb (93 kg)	Sr	Chaminade Julienne High School	Dayton, Ohio

Head coach

- Anthony Grant (Dayton)

Assistant coach(es)

- James Kane (Florida)
- Jermaine Henderson (Miami (OH))
- Sean Damaska (Northern Illinois)
- Nick Irvin
- Jordan Talley

Legend

- (C) Team captain
- (S) Suspended
- (I) Ineligible
- (W) Walk-on
- Injured
- Current redshirt

Roster
Last update: November 8, 2026

== Schedule and results ==
Date time, TV	Rank^{#}	Opponent^{#}	Result	Record	High points	High rebounds	High assists	Site (attendance) city, state
Exhibition
October 7, 2026*; 5:30 p.m.		vs. Xavier; CareSource Invitational	L 76–82	–	16 – Lowery	4 – Lowery	3 – Tied	Lindner Family Tennis Center (11,017); Mason, OH
October 17, 2026*; 7:00 p.m., ESPN+		Notre Dame	W 75–65	–	20 – Thomas	6 – Thomas	3 – Derkack	UD Arena (13,407); Dayton, OH
October 24, 2026*; 7:00 p.m.		Morehead State	W 88–56	–	14 – L'Etang	6 – Tied	4 – Joseph	UD Arena (13,407); Dayton, OH
Non-conference regular season
November 2, 2026*; 7:00 p.m., WHIO		NJIT	W 89–58	1–0	21 – Derkack	11 – Tied	4 – Tied	UD Arena (13,407); Dayton, OH
November 7, 2026*; 7:00 p.m., ESPN+		Northern Illinois	L 76–81 ^{OT}	1–1	20 – Derkack	10 – Derkack	2 – Tied	UD Arena (13,407); Dayton, OH
November 10, 2026*; 7:00 p.m., Spectrum News 1		Siena	L 89–99	1–2	25 – Derkack	10 – Derkack	8 – Joseph	UD Arena (13,407); Dayton, OH
November 14, 2026*; 7:30 p.m., WHIO		Cincinnati	L 72–95	1–3	19 – L'Etang	7 – L'Etang	3 – Tied	UD Arena (13,407); Dayton, OH
November 17, 2026*; 7:00 p.m., Spectrum News 1		Central Michigan	W 88-63	2-3	12 – Tied	7 – Garner	Luczynski – 3	UD Arena (13,407); Dayton, OH
November 20, 2026*; 5:30 p.m., ESPN2		vs. Utah; Charleston Classic	W 63-46	3-3	14 – Tied	9 – Derkack	2 – Tied	TD Arena; Charleston, SC
November 22, 2026*; 1:00 p.m., ESPN2		vs. Northwestern; Charleston Classic						TD Arena; Charleston, SC
November 29, 2026*; 1:00 p.m., ESPN		vs. Memphis; A-10/American Showcase						Nationwide Arena; Columbus, OH
December 2, 2026*; 7:00 p.m., Spectrum News 1		Loyola (MD)						UD Arena; Dayton, OH
December 5, 2026*; 12:00 p.m., The CW		at Florida State						Donald L. Tucker Center; Tallahassee, FL
December 12, 2026*; 7:00 p.m., Spectrum News 1		South Florida						UD Arena; Dayton, OH
December 15, 2026*; 7:00 p.m., ESPN+		UTRGV						UD Arena; Dayton, OH
December 19, 2026*; 6:00 p.m., ESPN+		at Liberty						Liberty Arena; Lynchburg, VA
December 23, 2026*; 7:00 p.m., ESPN+		Southeastern Louisiana						UD Arena; Dayton, OH
Atlantic 10 regular season
December 30, 2026; 7:00 p.m., Spectrum News 1		La Salle						UD Arena; Dayton, OH
January 2, 2027; 2:30 p.m., USA		at Davidson						John M. Belk Arena; Davidson, NC
January 6, 2027; 7:00 p.m., WHIO		Loyola Chicago						UD Arena; Dayton, OH
January 9, 2027; 6:00 p.m., CBSSN		at Saint Louis						Chaifetz Arena; St. Louis, MO
January 13, 2027; 7:00 p.m., WHIO		Richmond						UD Arena; Dayton, OH
January 16, 2027; 4:00 p.m., CBSSN		at St. Bonaventure						Reilly Center; St. Bonaventure, NY
January 22, 2027; 7:00 p.m., ESPN2		VCU						UD Arena; Dayton, OH
January 26, 2027; 7:00 p.m., ESPN+		at Duquesne						UPMC Cooper Fieldhouse; Pittsburgh, PA
January 29, 2027; 6:00 p.m., ESPN2		Saint Louis						UD Arena; Dayton, OH
February 2, 2027; 9:00 p.m., CBSSN		at Loyola Chicago						Joseph J. Gentile Arena; Chicago, IL
February 6, 2027; 4:30 p.m., CBSSN		at Fordham						Rose Hill Gymnasium; Bronx, NY
February 13, 2027; 12:00 p.m., USA		Duquesne						UD Arena; Dayton, OH
February 16, 2027; 7:00 p.m., ESPN+		at George Washington						Charles E. Smith Center; Washington, D.C.
February 19, 2027; 5:00 p.m., ESPN2		Saint Joseph's						UD Arena; Dayton, OH
February 23, 2027; 8:30 p.m., CBSSN		George Mason						UD Arena; Dayton, OH
February 27, 2027; 6:00 p.m., CBSSN		at Rhode Island						Ryan Center; Kingston, RI
March 2, 2027; 6:00 p.m., CBSSN		George Washington						UD Arena; Dayton, OH
March 5, 2027; 7:00 p.m., ESPN2		at VCU						Siegel Center; Richmond, VA
A-10 tournament
March 10–14, 2027; TBA		vs. TBD						Barclays Center; Brooklyn, NY
*Non-conference game. ^{#}Rankings from AP poll. (#) Tournament seedings in parentheses. All times are in Eastern Time.
