= 2026–27 Tulsa Golden Hurricane men's basketball team =

American college basketball season

2026–27 Tulsa Golden Hurricane men's basketball
- Conference: American Conference
- Record: 4–1 (0–0 American)
- Head coach: Eric Konkol (5th season)
- Assistant coaches: Duffy Conroy; Desmond Haymon; Yaphett King
- Home arena: Reynolds Center

2026–27 American Conference men's basketball standings
	Conf.				Overall
Team	W		L	PCT	W		L	PCT
Tulsa	0	–	0	–	4	–	0	1.000
Florida Atlantic	0	–	0	–	4	–	1	.800
Wichita State	0	–	0	–	4	–	1	.800
East Carolina	0	–	0	–	3	–	1	.750
Memphis	0	–	0	–	3	–	1	.750
North Texas	0	–	0	–	3	–	1	.750
Charlotte	0	–	0	–	3	–	2	.600
Rice	0	–	0	–	3	–	2	.600
South Florida	0	–	0	–	3	–	2	.600
UAB	0	–	0	–	3	–	2	.600
UTSA	0	–	0	–	3	–	2	.600
Temple	0	–	0	–	2	–	2	.500
Tulane	0	–	0	–	2	–	3	.400
† 2027 American tournament winner As of November 21, 2026; Rankings from AP poll

The 2026–27 Tulsa Golden Hurricane men's basketball team represented the University of Tulsa during the 2026–27 NCAA Division I men's basketball season. The Golden Hurricane were led by fifth-year head coach Eric Konkol, and played their home games at the Reynolds Center in Tulsa, Oklahoma as members of the American Conference.

== Previous season ==
The Golden Hurricane finished the 2025–26 season 25–6, 13–5 in AAC play to finish in a tie for Second place. As a No. 3 seed in the AAC tournament, they beat North Texas in the quarterfinals of the conference tournament before losing to Wichita State in the semifinals.

The team was invited to the National Invitation Tournament as a host city. They beat Stephan F. Austin in the first round, UNLV in the second round, and Wichita State in the third round. In the semifinal Tulsa beat New Mexico, the one seed of their bracket. In the final they lost in overtime to Auburn, the one seed of their bracket. This ended the Teams year at 30–8 overall.

== Roster ==
2026–27 Tulsa Golden Hurricane men's basketball team
Players
Coaches

Pos.	#	Name	Height	Weight	Year	Previous school	Hometown
G	0	Kobe Williams	6 ft 4 in (1.93 m)	195 lb (88 kg)	Sr	Westminster Christian Missouri State	St. Louis, MO
G/F	1	Brent Moss	6 ft 6 in (1.98 m)	195 lb (88 kg)	Sr	Lima HS UTSA	Lima, OH
G	2	Jaylen Lawal	6 ft 3 in (1.91 m)	195 lb (88 kg)	So	iSchool of Lewisville	Plano, TX
G	3	Denton Forsythe	6 ft 2 in (1.88 m)	185 lb (84 kg)	Fr	Dale HS	Dale, OK
G	4	Myles Rigsby	6 ft 6 in (1.98 m)	190 lb (86 kg)	Sr	O.D. Wyatt HS; Troy	Ft. Worth, TX
G	5	Mike Williams III	6 ft 3 in (1.91 m)	185 lb (84 kg)	Sr	Bishop Walsh HS Seton Hall	Baltimore, MD
F	6	Kaleb Banks	6 ft 8 in (2.03 m)	215 lb (98 kg)		Fayette County Depual	Hampton, GA
G	7	Cal Conroy	6 ft 2 in (1.88 m)	168 lb (76 kg)	Jr	Bishop Kelly HS	Tulsa, OK
G	8	Leon Sifferlin	6 ft 6 in (1.98 m)	200 lb (91 kg)	So	JL Bourg	Bourg-en-Bresse, France
F	9	Derelle Desire	6 ft 11 in (2.11 m)	225 lb (102 kg)	Jr	Trinity Valley CC	London, England
G	10	Jeremiah Johnson	6 ft 4 in (1.93 m)	180 lb (82 kg)	Jr	PHH Prep Campbell	Del City, OK
F	13	Chris Loofe	6 ft 11 in (2.11 m)	240 lb (109 kg)	Sr	Link Year Prep MTSU	Leander, TX
F	15	Macon Emory	6 ft 8 in (2.03 m)	200 lb (91 kg)	Jr	Perkiomen HS Delaware	Devon, PA
F	27	Aleksa Dimitrijevic	7 ft 0 in (2.13 m)	220 lb (100 kg)		Dositej Creighton	Belgrade, Serbia
G	33	Carter Benton	6 ft 4 in (1.93 m)	205 lb (93 kg)	Jr	Holland Hall	Tulsa, OK

Head coach

- Eric Konkol (UW–Eau Claire)

Assistant coach(es)

- Duffy Conroy (St. Ambrose)
- Desmond Haymon (Stephen F. Austin)
- Yaphett King (Cal State Fullerton)
- Josh Wolfe
- Matty Carney

Legend

- (C) Team captain
- (S) Suspended
- (I) Ineligible
- (W) Walk-on
- Injured
- Current redshirt

Roster
Last update: November 11, 2026

== Schedule ==
Date time, TV	Rank^{#}	Opponent^{#}	Result	Record	High points	High rebounds	High assists	Site (attendance) city, state
Exhibition
October 23, 2026*; 2:30 pm		Oklahoma State	L 85–93	0–0	N/A – N/A	N/A – N/A	N/A – N/A`	Gallagher-Iba Arena; Stillwater, OK
Non-conference regular season
November 2, 2026*; 7:00 pm, Espn+		Ottawa (KS)	W 98–50	1–0	17 – Lawal	6 – Tied	4 – Tied	Reynolds Center (3042); Tulsa, OK
November 5, 2026*; 7:00 pm, Espn+		Northen Illinois	W 94–75	2–0	25 – Lawal	13 – Loofe	2 – Williams	Reynolds Center (3080); Tulsa, OK
November 11, 2026*; 7:00 pm, Espn+		Oral Roberts; The Mayor's Cup	W 80–71	3–0	18 – Tied	11 – Loffe	5 – Forsythe	Reynolds Center (4066); Tulsa, OK
November 16, 2026*; 6:00 pm, ESPNU		Western Kentucky	W 67–64	4–0	18 – Loofe	9 – Loofe	5 – Lawal	Reynolds Center (3267); Tulsa, OK
November 20, 2026*; 6:30 pm, SEC+		vs. Mississippi State	L 61-72	4-1	21 – Johnson	7 – Rigsby	4 – Rigsby	Mississippi Coliseum (1111); Jackson, MS
November 23, 2026*; 1:00 pm		vs. Oregon State; Acrisure Series			Acrisure Stadium; Pittsburgh, PA			
November 24, 2026*; 3:30 pm, CBS Sports Network		vs. Illinois State; Acrisure Series			Acrisure Stadium; Pittsburgh, PA			
November 29, 2026*; 1:00 pm, ESPN+		IU Indy			Reynolds Center; Tulsa, OK			
December 2, 2026*; 7:00 pm, ESPN+		Haskell Indian Nations			Reynolds Center; Tulsa, OK			
December 6, 2026*; 6:00 pm		Missouri State			Great Southern Bank Arena; Springfield, MO			
December 12, 2026*; 2:00 pm, ESPN+		Florida A&M			Reynolds Center; Tulsa, OK			
December 15, 2026*; 7:00 pm, ESPN+		Jackson State			Reynolds Center; Tulsa, OK			
December 19, 2026*; 7:30 pm, CBS Sports Network		vs. Utah State; Texas Legends College Classic			Comerica Center; Frisco, TX			
December 21, 2026*; 3:00 pm, CBS Sports Network		vs. San Francisco; Texas Legends College Classic			Comercia Center; Frisco, TX			
American regular season
December 30, 2026; 7:00 pm, ESPN2		South Florida			Reynolds Center; Tulsa, OK			
January 3, 2027; 1:00 pm, ESPN+		Florida Atlantic			Reynolds Center; Tulsa, OK			
January 7, 2027; 7:00 pm, ESPN+		at USTA			Convocation Center; San Antonio, TX			
January 14, 2027; 7:00 pm, EPSN+		East Carolina			Reynolds Center; Tulsa, OK			
January 17, 2027; 12:00 pm, ESPN		at South Florida			Yuengling Center; Tampa, FL			
January 20, 2027; 4:00 pm, ESPN2		at Florida Atlantic			Eleanor R. Baldwin Arena; Boca Raton, FL			
January 23, 2027; 2:00 pm, ESPN+		Wichita State; The Rivalry			Reynolds Center; Tulsa, OK			
January 28, 2027; 5:30 pm, ESPN+		at Temple			Liacouras Center; Philadelphia, PA			
January 31, 2027; 2:00 pm, ESPN+		at North Texas			UNT Coliseum; Denton, TX			
February 4, 2027; 7:00pm, ESPN+		UAB			Reynolds Center; Tulsa, OK			
February 7, 2027; 2:00 pm, ESPN+		Tulane			Reynolds Center; Tulsa, OK			
February 11, 2027; 7:00 pm, ESPN+		at Rice			Tudor Fieldhouse; Houston, TX			
February 14, 2027; 1:00 pm, ESPN+		North Texas			Reynolds Center; Tulsa, OK			
February 21, 2027; 2:00 pm, ESPN+		UTSA			Reynolds Center; Tulsa, OK			
February 25, 2027; 5:00 pm, ESPN2		at Memphis			FedEx Forum; Memphis, TN			
February 28, 2027; 3:00 pm, ESPNU		at UAB			Bartow Arena; Brimingham, AL			
March 3, 2027; 7:00 pm, ESPN+		Charlotte			Reynolds Center; Tulsa, OK			
March 6, 2027; 6:00 pm, ESPN+		at Wichita State; The Rivalry			Charles Koch Arena; Wichita, KS			
