= 2026–27 Tulane Green Wave men's basketball team =

American college basketball season

2026–27 Tulane Green Wave men's basketball
- Conference: American Conference
- Record: 2–2 (0–0 American)
- Head coach: Ron Hunter (8th season)
- Associate head coach: Ray McCallum
- Assistant coaches: Kim Lewis; Gebereal Baitey; R. J. Hunter; Ben Miner
- Home arena: Devlin Fieldhouse

2026–27 American Conference men's basketball standings
	Conf.				Overall
Team	W		L	PCT	W		L	PCT
Tulsa	0	–	0	–	3	–	0	1.000
East Carolina	0	–	0	–	2	–	1	.667
Florida Atlantic	0	–	0	–	2	–	1	.667
Memphis	0	–	0	–	2	–	1	.667
North Texas	0	–	0	–	2	–	1	.667
Tulane	0	–	0	–	2	–	1	.667
UTSA	0	–	0	–	2	–	1	.667
Wichita State	0	–	0	–	2	–	1	.667
UAB	0	–	0	–	2	–	1	.667
Charlotte	0	–	0	–	2	–	2	.500
Rice	0	–	0	–	1	–	2	.333
South Florida	0	–	0	–	1	–	2	.333
Temple	0	–	0	–	1	–	2	.333
† 2027 American tournament winner As of November 14, 2026; Rankings from AP poll

The 2026–27 Tulane Green Wave men's basketball team represents Tulane University during the 2026–27 NCAA Division I men's basketball season. The Green Wave, led by eighth-year head coach Ron Hunter, play their home games at Devlin Fieldhouse in New Orleans, Louisiana, as a member of the American Conference.

== Previous season ==
The Green Wave finished the 2025–26 season 18–15, 8–10 in American play. As the No. 9 seed in the American tournament, they defeated No. 8 seed Memphis 81–69 in the first round before losing to No. 5 seed Charlotte 74–60 in the second round.

== Offseason ==
=== Coaching changes ===
On May 1, 2026, Hunter added Kim Lewis, a former Tulane player and two-time Tulane Athletics Hall of Fame inductee, as an assistant coach. It is Lewis's third stint on the Tulane staff, after spending the previous two seasons at Robert Morris. Hunter also promoted his son, R. J. Hunter, from volunteer assistant to a full-time assistant coach.

=== Roster turnover ===
Eleven players from the 2025–26 team did not return, leaving five returning players. Leading scorer Rowan Brumbaugh, who averaged 19.2 points per game, entered the transfer portal on April 6, 2026, and committed to SMU on April 19. Scotty Middleton, Curtis Williams Jr., Luke Rasmussen and Asher Woods also entered the portal.

On June 16, 2026, Tulane announced a 10-player signing class of seven transfers and three freshmen. The transfers included Krystian Lewis, who led Louisiana–Monroe with 18.4 points per game in 2025–26, and TJ Nadeau, a third-team All-Horizon League selection at Detroit Mercy.

=== Departures ===
Tulane departures
Name	Number	Pos.	Height	Weight	Year	Hometown	Reason for Departure
Gregg Glenn III	2	F	6'7"	240	Senior	Pompano Beach, Florida	Graduated
Scotty Middleton	5	F	6'6"	165	Junior	Miami, Florida	Entered transfer portal
Rowan Brumbaugh	7	G	6'4"	185	RS Junior	Washington, D.C.	Transferred to SMU
Luke Rasmussen	11	G	6'8"	215	RS Sophomore	Haverford, Pennsylvania	Entered transfer portal
Joseph Teich	13	G	5'10"	155	Sophomore	Fort Lauderdale, Florida	Left the program
Asher Woods	22	G	6'3"	190	Senior	Atlanta, Georgia	Entered transfer portal
Percy Daniels	23	C	6'10"	230	Senior	Baton Rouge, Louisiana	Graduated
Jake Shapiro	34	G	6'1"	190	RS Junior	Los Angeles, California	Left the program
Davion Bradford	55	C	7'0"	265	Senior	St. Louis, Missouri	Graduated
Vasilije Kuridza	77	F	6'9"	235	Freshman	Banja Luka, Bosnia and Herzegovina	Left the program
Curtis Williams Jr.	99	G	6'6"	180	Junior	Detroit, Michigan	Transferred to High Point

=== Incoming transfers ===
Tulane incoming transfers
Name	Number	Pos.	Height	Weight	Year	Hometown	Previous School
Krystian Lewis	3	G	6'2"	190	Junior	Monroe, Louisiana	Louisiana–Monroe
Joah Chappelle	4	F	6'8"	195	Junior	Atlanta, Georgia	Georgia State
Dame Salane	6	C	7'1"	205	RS Freshman	Biella, Italy	Arizona State
Jordann Dumont	10	F	6'8"	220	RS Junior	Montreal, Quebec, Canada	VCU
Ryan Blount	14	G	6'7"	215	Junior	Oviedo, Florida	Tampa
Carson Schwieger	22	F	6'9"	220	RS Junior	Overland Park, Kansas	Queens
TJ Nadeau	33	G	6'5"	190	Junior	South Lyon, Michigan	Detroit Mercy

=== 2026 recruiting class ===
Tulane 2026 recruiting class
Name	Number	Pos.	Height	Weight	Hometown	High school
Tobias Brinkley	7	F	6'7"	195	Atlanta, Georgia	Decatur HS
Ryan Meltzer	8	G	6'1"	185	Miami Beach, Florida	Newman School
Noah Mister	9	G	6'3"	170	Chicago, Illinois	Victory Rock Prep

== Preseason ==
On October 9, 2026, the American Conference released its preseason coaches' poll. Tulane was picked to finish tenth in the conference, and no Tulane players were named to the preseason all-conference teams.

=== Preseason rankings ===
American Conference Preseason Poll
Place	Team	Votes
1	Wichita State	140 (9)
2	Memphis	131 (4)
3	South Florida	118
4	Tulsa	99
5	Charlotte	95
6	UAB	89
7	North Texas	84
8	Florida Atlantic	75
9	Temple	61
10	Tulane	52
11	East Carolina	34
12	Rice	22
13	UTSA	14
(#) first-place votes

== Roster ==
2026–27 Tulane Green Wave men's basketball team
Players
Coaches

Pos.	#	Name	Height	Weight	Year	Previous school	Hometown
F	0	Tyler Ringgold	6 ft 8 in (2.03 m)	230 lb (104 kg)	RS Jr	Southern Lab; Texas A&M	Baton Rouge, LA
G	1	Josiah Moore	6 ft 5 in (1.96 m)	200 lb (91 kg)	Jr	Rouse HS; Oral Roberts	Leander, TX
G	3	Krystian Lewis	6 ft 2 in (1.88 m)	190 lb (86 kg)	Jr	Wossman HS; Louisiana–Monroe	Monroe, LA
F	4	Joah Chappelle	6 ft 8 in (2.03 m)	195 lb (88 kg)	Jr	Dutchtown HS; Georgia State	Atlanta, GA
G	5	KJ Greene	6 ft 3 in (1.91 m)	175 lb (79 kg)	Jr	Pace Academy	Atlanta, GA
C	6	Dame Salane	7 ft 1 in (2.16 m)	205 lb (93 kg)	RS Fr	Stafford HS; Arizona State	Biella, Italy
F	7	Tobias Brinkley	6 ft 7 in (2.01 m)	195 lb (88 kg)	Fr	Decatur HS	Atlanta, GA
G	8	Ryan Meltzer	6 ft 1 in (1.85 m)	185 lb (84 kg)	Fr	Newman School	Miami Beach, FL
G	9	Noah Mister	6 ft 3 in (1.91 m)	170 lb (77 kg)	Fr	Victory Rock Prep	Chicago, IL
F	10	Jordann Dumont	6 ft 8 in (2.03 m)	220 lb (100 kg)	RS Jr	Hamilton Heights Christian Academy; VCU	Montreal, QC
G	11	Robert Moore	6 ft 7 in (2.01 m)	190 lb (86 kg)	So	Porter-Gaud School	Charleston, SC
G	14	Ryan Blount	6 ft 7 in (2.01 m)	215 lb (98 kg)	Jr	Rockledge HS; Tampa	Oviedo, FL
F	22	Carson Schwieger	6 ft 9 in (2.06 m)	220 lb (100 kg)	RS Jr	Link Year Prep; Queens	Overland Park, KS
F	32	Luke Cronin	6 ft 8 in (2.03 m)	215 lb (98 kg)	Sr	Great Neck North; Yeshiva	Great Neck, NY
G	33	TJ Nadeau	6 ft 5 in (1.96 m)	190 lb (86 kg)	Jr	Detroit Catholic Central; Detroit Mercy	South Lyon, MI

Head coach

- Ron Hunter (Miami (OH))

Assistant coach(es)

- Ray McCallum (Ball State)
- Kim Lewis (Tulane)
- Gebereal Baitey (Emory)
- R. J. Hunter (Georgia State)
- Ben Miner

Legend

- (C) Team captain
- (S) Suspended
- (I) Ineligible
- (W) Walk-on
- Injured
- Current redshirt

Roster
Last update: November 13, 2026

== Schedule and results ==
Date time, TV	Rank^{#}	Opponent^{#}	Result	Record	High points	High rebounds	High assists	Site (attendance) city, state
Exhibition
October 28, 2026*; 6:30 p.m.		Spring Hill	W 108–97	–	27 – Lewis	13 – Ringgold	4 – Tied	Devlin Fieldhouse; New Orleans, LA
Non-conference regular season
November 2, 2026*; 7:00 p.m., ESPN+		UT Martin	W 100–98 ^{2OT}	1–0	40 – Lewis	7 – Lewis	5 – Lewis	Devlin Fieldhouse (1,288); New Orleans, LA
November 5, 2026*; 6:30 p.m., ESPN+		Jackson State	L 85–87	1–1	16 – Tied	8 – Ringgold	8 – Greene	Devlin Fieldhouse (1,077); New Orleans, LA
November 10, 2026*; 6:30 p.m., ESPN+		Nicholls	W 77–63	2–1	35 – Lewis	8 – Chappelle	4 – Greene	Devlin Fieldhouse (956); New Orleans, LA
November 14, 2026*; 11:00 a.m., ESPN+		at Akron	L 63–65	2–2	20 – Nadeau	8 – Ringgold	3 – Greene	James A. Rhodes Arena; Akron, OH
November 19, 2026*; 6:30 p.m., ESPN+		at Louisiana Tech						Thomas Assembly Center; Ruston, LA
November 23, 2026*; 3:00 p.m.		vs. Georgia State; Fort Myers Tip-Off						Suncoast Credit Union Arena; Fort Myers, FL
November 25, 2026*; 12:30 p.m.		vs. Davidson; Fort Myers Tip-Off						Suncoast Credit Union Arena; Fort Myers, FL
November 29, 2026*; 1:00 p.m., ESPN2		Louisiana–Monroe						Devlin Fieldhouse; New Orleans, LA
December 2, 2026*; 7:30 p.m.		at Southern Miss						Reed Green Coliseum; Hattiesburg, MS
December 6, 2026*; 1:00 p.m., ESPN+		Louisiana						Devlin Fieldhouse; New Orleans, LA
December 9, 2026*; 4:00 p.m., ESPN+		Dillard						Devlin Fieldhouse; New Orleans, LA
December 12, 2026*; 1:00 p.m., ESPN+		Rhode Island						Devlin Fieldhouse; New Orleans, LA
December 18, 2026*; 6:30 p.m., ESPN+		Mississippi Valley State						Devlin Fieldhouse; New Orleans, LA
December 22, 2026*; 11:00 a.m.		vs. Western Kentucky; Scout Holiday Festiball						Fort Lauderdale, FL
American regular season
December 30, 2026; 6:30 p.m., ESPN+		at UAB						Bartow Arena; Birmingham, AL
January 3, 2027; 4:00 p.m., ESPNU		Rice						Devlin Fieldhouse; New Orleans, LA
January 7, 2027; 6:00 p.m., ESPN+		at East Carolina						Williams Arena at Minges Coliseum; Greenville, NC
January 10, 2027; 2:00 p.m., ESPNU		South Florida						Devlin Fieldhouse; New Orleans, LA
January 14, 2027; 7:00 p.m., ESPN+		at North Texas						The Super Pit; Denton, TX
January 17, 2027; 11:00 a.m., ESPNU		at UTSA						Convocation Center; San Antonio, TX
January 20, 2027; 6:30 p.m., ESPN+		Temple						Devlin Fieldhouse; New Orleans, LA
January 23, 2027; 1:00 p.m., ESPN+		Charlotte						Devlin Fieldhouse; New Orleans, LA
January 30, 2027; 1:00 p.m., ESPN+		at Rice						Tudor Fieldhouse; Houston, TX
February 2, 2027; 6:00 p.m., ESPN2		Memphis						Devlin Fieldhouse; New Orleans, LA
February 7, 2027; 2:00 p.m., ESPN+		at Tulsa						Reynolds Center; Tulsa, OK
February 10, 2027; 6:30 p.m., ESPN+		at Wichita State						Charles Koch Arena; Wichita, KS
February 14, 2027; 2:00 p.m., ESPNU		Florida Atlantic						Devlin Fieldhouse; New Orleans, LA
February 18, 2027; 7:00 p.m., ESPNU		UTSA						Devlin Fieldhouse; New Orleans, LA
February 21, 2027; 3:00 p.m., ESPNU		East Carolina						Devlin Fieldhouse; New Orleans, LA
February 24, 2027; 5:30 p.m., ESPN+		at Temple						Liacouras Center; Philadelphia, PA
March 3, 2027; 6:30 p.m., ESPN+		Wichita State						Devlin Fieldhouse; New Orleans, LA
March 7, 2027; 2:00 p.m., ESPN+		at Memphis						FedExForum; Memphis, TN
American tournament
March 10–14, 2027; TBA		vs. TBD						Yuengling Center; Tampa, FL
*Non-conference game. ^{#}Rankings from AP poll. (#) Tournament seedings in parentheses. All times are in Central Time.
