= 2026–27 Richmond Spiders men's basketball team =

American college basketball season

2026–27 Richmond Spiders men's basketball
- Conference: Atlantic 10 Conference
- Record: 3–3 ( A-10)
- Head coach: Chris Mooney (22nd season)
- Associate head coach: Peter Thomas
- Assistant coaches: David Boyden; Will Gipe; Maurice Joseph; Jack Fahed
- Home arena: Robins Center

2026–27 Atlantic 10 men's basketball standings
	Conf.				Overall
Team	W		L	PCT	W		L	PCT
Duquesne	0	–	0	–	5	–	0	1.000
George Washington	0	–	0	–	5	–	1	.833
Rhode Island	0	–	0	–	5	–	1	.833
Saint Joseph's	0	–	0	–	5	–	1	.833
Fordham	0	–	0	–	4	–	1	.800
George Mason	0	–	0	–	4	–	1	.800
St. Bonaventure	0	–	0	–	4	–	1	.800
Saint Louis	0	–	0	–	3	–	1	.750
VCU	0	–	0	–	3	–	1	.750
Davidson	0	–	0	–	3	–	2	.600
Loyola Chicago	0	–	0	–	3	–	2	.600
Dayton	0	–	0	–	3	–	3	.500
Richmond	0	–	0	–	3	–	3	.500
La Salle	0	–	0	–	2	–	3	.400
† 2027 A-10 tournament winner As of November 21, 2026; Rankings from AP poll

The 2026–27 Richmond Spiders men's basketball team is representing the University of Richmond during the 2026–27 NCAA Division I men's basketball season. The Spiders, led by 22nd-year head coach Chris Mooney, play their home games at the Robins Center in Richmond, Virginia as members of the Atlantic 10 Conference.

== Previous season ==
The Spiders finished the 2025–26 season with a record of 15–17, including 5–13 in Atlantic 10 play. As the No. 11 seed in the A-10 tournament, they lost in the first round to Loyola Chicago.

== Offseason ==
=== Departures ===
Name	Number	Pos.	Height	Weight	Year	Hometown	Reason for departure
Mikkel Tyne	1	G	5'10"	180	Junior	Toronto, Canada	Transferred to Buffalo
Jaden Daughtry	2	F	6'7"	230	Junior	Richmond, VA	Transferred to Stony Brook
Will Johnston	4	G	6'3"	185	GS Senior	Sydney, Australia	Graduated
AJ Lopez	6	G	6'5"	185	GS Senior	Queens, NY	Graduated
Jonathan Beagle	9	F	6'10"	250	Senior	Hudson Falls, NY	Graduated
David Thomas	12	G	6'2"	200	Junior	McDonough, GA	Transferred to Georgia State
Mike Walz	21	C	6'11"	260	Senior	Berwyn, PA	Graduated
Jaylen Robinson	24	F	6'6"	225	(redshirt) Freshman	Jacksonville, FL	Transferred to Sacred Heart
Apostolos Roumoglou	33	F	6'8"	215	Senior	Xanthi, Greece	Graduated
Bryson McGlothin	35	F	6'8"	188	(redshirt) Freshman	Plano, TX	Transferred to UT Arlington

=== Incoming transfers ===
Name	Num	Pos.	Height	Weight	Year	Hometown	Previous school
Dominick Stewart	1	G	6'5"	195	Junior	Ocean Springs, MS	Penn State
Andrew Ball	4	F	6'9"	215	GS Senior	Marlton, NJ	Monmouth
Jack McCaffery	6	F	6'9"	215	Sophomore	Iowa City, IA	Butler
Jamie Kaiser Jr.	7	G/F	6'6"	205	Junior	Burke, VA	Butler
Derin Saran	13	G	6'5"	190	Senior	Istanbul, Turkey	UC Irvine
Amon Dörries	21	C	6'11"	230	Sophomore	Potsdam, Germany	Bucknell

=== Recruiting classes ===
==== 2026 recruiting class ====
College recruiting
Name	Hometown	School	Height	Weight	Commit date
Sam Simmons Jr. PG	Kansas City, KS	Olathe North High School	5 ft 9 in (1.75 m)	165 lb (75 kg)	Jul 31, 2025
Sam Simmons Jr. PG	Recruit ratings: Rivals: 247Sports: ESPN: (NR)				
Dane Caldwell; PF	Sellersburg, IN	Silver Creek High School	6 ft 9 in (2.06 m)	190 lb (86 kg)	Sep 29, 2025
Dane Caldwell; PF	Recruit ratings: Rivals: 247Sports: ESPN: (NR)				
Chad Cook; PF	Syracuse, NY	New Hampton School	6 ft 8 in (2.03 m)	220 lb (100 kg)	Feb 11, 2025
Chad Cook; PF	Recruit ratings: Rivals: 247Sports: ESPN: (NR)				
Jaden Shoultz; SG	Columbus, OH	DeMatha Catholic High School	6 ft 4 in (1.93 m)	175 lb (79 kg)	Jun 5, 2026
Jaden Shoultz; SG	Recruit ratings: Rivals: 247Sports: ESPN: (NR)				
Overall recruit ranking:
Note: In many cases, Scout, Rivals, 247Sports, On3, and ESPN may conflict in their listings of height and weight.; In these cases, the average was taken. ESPN grades are on a 100-point scale.; Sources: "Rivals.com 2026 Richmond Commitments". Rivals.; "ESPN 2026 Richmond Commitments". ESPN.; "2026 Team Ranking". Rivals.

== Roster ==
2026–27 Richmond Spiders men's basketball team
Players
Coaches

Pos.	#	Name	Height	Weight	Year	Previous school	Hometown
F	0	Chad Cook	6 ft 8 in (2.03 m)	220 lb (100 kg)	Fr	New Hampton School	Syracuse, NY
G	1	Dominick Stewart	6 ft 5 in (1.96 m)	195 lb (88 kg)	Jr	Southern California Academy; Penn State	Ocean Springs, MS
G	2	Sam Simmons Jr.	5 ft 9 in (1.75 m)	165 lb (75 kg)	Fr	Olathe North High School	Kansas City, KS
G	3	Aiden Argabright	6 ft 0 in (1.83 m)	155 lb (70 kg)	So	John Marshall High School	Richmond, VA
F	4	Andrew Ball	6 ft 9 in (2.06 m)	215 lb (98 kg)	GS	Shawnee High School; Monmouth	Marlton, NJ
G	5	Collin Tanner	6 ft 6 in (1.98 m)	205 lb (93 kg)	Sr	Combine Academy	Creedmoor, NC
F	6	Jack McCaffery	6 ft 9 in (2.06 m)	215 lb (98 kg)	So	Iowa City West High School; Butler	Iowa City, IA
G/F	7	Jamie Kasier Jr.	6 ft 6 in (1.98 m)	205 lb (93 kg)	Sr	IMG Academy; Butler	Burke, VA
G	8	Donovan Richardson	6 ft 6 in (1.98 m)	190 lb (86 kg)	So	Steward School	Richmond, VA
G	10	Jaden Shoultz	6 ft 4 in (1.93 m)	175 lb (79 kg)	Fr	DeMatha Catholic High School	Columbus, OH
G	11	Will Harper III	6 ft 5 in (1.96 m)	185 lb (84 kg)	So	Gonzaga College High School	Bowie, MD
G	13	Derin Saran	6 ft 5 in (1.96 m)	190 lb (86 kg)	Sr	Asheville School; UC Irvine	Istanbul, Turkey
G	15	Kirby Mooney (W)	6 ft 3 in (1.91 m)	205 lb (93 kg)	Jr	William Tennent High School	Southampton, PA
C	16	Dylan Homenick	6 ft 11 in (2.11 m)	220 lb (100 kg)	So	Perkiomen School	Surrey, Canada
C	21	Amon Dörries	6 ft 11 in (2.11 m)	230 lb (104 kg)	So	SLZB; Bucknell	Potsdam, Germany
F	22	Dane Caldwell	6 ft 9 in (2.06 m)	190 lb (86 kg)	Fr	Silver Creek High School	Sellersburg, IN

Head coach

- Chris Mooney (Princeton)

Assistant coach(es)

- Peter Thomas (Richmond)
- David Boyden (Western Kentucky)
- Will Gipe (Virginia Tech)
- Maurice Joseph (Vermont)
- Jack Fahed (James Madison)

Legend

- (C) Team captain
- (S) Suspended
- (I) Ineligible
- (W) Walk-on
- Injured
- Current redshirt

Roster
Last update: October 9, 2026

== Schedule and results ==
Date time, TV	Rank^{#}	Opponent^{#}	Result	Record	High points	High rebounds	High assists	Site (attendance) city, state
Exhibition
October 9, 2026*; 7:00 p.m.		Virginia	L 53–96		15 – Stewart	5 – Saran	2 – Tanner	John Paul Jones Arena (11,847); Charlottesville, VA
October 18, 2026*; 2:00 p.m.		James Madison	L 81–90		17 – Kaiser	5 – Tied	5 – Tied	Atlantic Union Bank Center (555); Harrisonburg, VA
Non-conference regular season
November 2, 2026*; 7:00 p.m., ESPN+/MASN		UNC Asheville	W 100–77	1–0	29 – Stewart	6 – Dörries	8 – Saran	Robins Center (3,785); Richmond, VA
November 5, 2026*; 7:00 p.m., ESPN+		Southern Virginia	W 107–46	2–0	17 – Stewart	7 – Saran	7 – Saran	Robins Center (3,738); Richmond, VA
November 8, 2026*; 5:00 p.m., ESPN2		vs. Temple	W 79–53	3–0	16 – Kaiser	12 – Saran	6 – Saran	The Palestra (3,600); Philadelphia, PA
November 12, 2026*; 8:00 p.m., ESPN+		at Southern Illinois	L 70–80	3–1	25 – Stewart	7 – Saran	4 – Tied	Banterra Center (3,335); Carbondale, IL
November 16, 2026*; 7:00 p.m., ACCNX		at Virginia Tech	L 68–85	3–2	17 – Kasier	6 – Kaiser	3 – Kaiser	Cassell Coliseum (5,604); Blacksburg, VA
November 20, 2026*; 7:00 p.m., PassThaBall		vs. Western Kentucky; Greenbrier Tip-Off	L 68–82	3–3	14 – Tied	6 – Ball	4 – Dörries	Colonial Hall (568); White Sulphur Springs, WV
November 22, 2026*; 4:30 p.m., CBSSN		vs. Liberty; Greenbrier Tip-Off						Colonial Hall; White Sulphur Springs, WV
November 25, 2026*; 6:00 p.m., ESPN+		Bethune–Cookman						Robins Center; Richmond, VA
November 28, 2026*; 6:00 p.m., ESPN+/MASN		VMI						Robins Center; Richmond, VA
December 1, 2026*; 7:00 p.m., ESPN+		at East Carolina						Williams Arena; Greenville, NC
December 5, 2026*; 2:00 p.m.		at Old Dominion						Chartway Arena; Norfolk, VA
December 12, 2026*; 6:00 p.m., ESPN+		Elon						Robins Center; Richmond, VA
December 18, 2026*; 7:00 p.m., ESPN+/MASN		William & Mary						Robins Center; Richmond, VA
December 21, 2026*; 7:00 p.m., ESPN+		Lafayette						Robins Center; Richmond, VA
A-10 regular season
December 30, 2026; 7:00 p.m., ESPN+		at George Mason						EagleBank Arena; Fairfax, VA
January 2, 2027; 6:00 p.m., ESPN+/MASN		Loyola Chicago						Robins Center; Richmond, VA
January 6, 2027; 8:00 p.m., CBSSN		Saint Louis						Robins Center; Richmond, VA
January 9, 2027; 2:30 p.m., USA		at Davidson						Belk Arena; Davidson, NC
January 13, 2027; 7:00 p.m., ESPN+		at Dayton						UD Arena; Dayton, OH
January 16, 2027; 4:30 p.m., USA		Rhode Island						Robins Center; Richmond, VA
January 20, 2027; 7:00 p.m., ESPN+		Duquesne						Robins Center; Richmond, VA
January 27, 2027; 7:00 p.m., ESPN+		at George Washington						Charles E. Smith Center; Washington, D.C.
January 30, 2027; 8:00 p.m., CBSSN		at VCU; Capital City Classic						Siegel Center; Richmond, VA
February 3, 2027; 7:00 p.m., ESPN+/MASN		Davidson						Robins Center; Richmond, VA
February 6, 2027; 2:30 p.m., USA		at St. Bonaventure						Reilly Center; St. Bonaventure, NY
February 10, 2027; 7:00 p.m., ESPN+/MASN		George Washington						Robins Center; Richmond, VA
February 13, 2027; 12:00 p.m., CBSSN		VCU; Capital City Classic						Robins Center; Richmond, VA
February 17, 2027; 7:00 p.m., ESPN+		at Rhode Island						Ryan Center; Kingston, RI
February 20, 2027; 2:30 p.m., USA		St. Bonaventure						Robins Center; Richmond, VA
February 27, 2027; 4:30 p.m., USA		at La Salle						John Glaser Arena; Philadelphia, PA
March 3, 2027; 7:00 p.m., ESPN+		at Saint Joseph's						Hagan Arena; Philadelphia, PA
March 6, 2027; 6:00 p.m.		Fordham						Robins Center; Richmond, VA
A-10 tournament
March 10–14, 2027; TBD		vs.						Barclays Center; Brooklyn, NY
*Non-conference game. ^{#}Rankings from AP poll. (#) Tournament seedings in parentheses. All times are in Eastern.
