= 2026–27 George Washington Revolutionaries men's basketball team =

American college basketball season

2026–27 George Washington Revolutionaries men's basketball
- Conference: Atlantic 10 Conference
- Record: 5–1 (0–0 A–10)
- Head coach: Chris Caputo (5th season)
- Assistant coaches: Lamont Franklin; Matt Colpoys; Aaron Thompson; Joe Barrer
- Home arena: Charles E. Smith Center

2026–27 Atlantic 10 men's basketball standings
	Conf.				Overall
Team	W		L	PCT	W		L	PCT
Duquesne	0	–	0	–	5	–	0	1.000
George Washington	0	–	0	–	5	–	0	1.000
Rhode Island	0	–	0	–	5	–	0	1.000
Saint Joseph's	0	–	0	–	5	–	0	1.000
Fordham	0	–	0	–	4	–	1	.800
George Mason	0	–	0	–	4	–	1	.800
St. Bonaventure	0	–	0	–	4	–	1	.800
Saint Louis	0	–	0	–	3	–	1	.750
VCU	0	–	0	–	3	–	1	.750
Davidson	0	–	0	–	3	–	2	.600
Loyola Chicago	0	–	0	–	3	–	2	.600
Richmond	0	–	0	–	3	–	2	.600
Dayton	0	–	0	–	2	–	3	.400
La Salle	0	–	0	–	2	–	3	.400
† 2027 A-10 tournament winner As of November 20, 2026; Rankings from AP poll

The 2026–27 George Washington Revolutionaries men's basketball team represents George Washington University during the 2026–27 NCAA Division I men's basketball season. The Revolutionaries, led by fifth-year head coach Chris Caputo, play their home games at the Charles E. Smith Center in Washington, D.C., as a member of the Atlantic 10 Conference.

== Previous season ==
The Revolutionaries finished the 2025–26 season 19–16, 8–10 in A-10 play. As the No. 9 seed in the A-10 tournament, they defeated Fordham 66–62 in the second round before losing to top-seeded Saint Louis 88–81 in the quarterfinals. The Revolutionaries received a bid to the NIT, where they won at Utah Valley 79–78 in the first round, the program's first postseason win in nine years, before losing at New Mexico 86–61 in the second round.

== Offseason ==
=== Coaching staff ===
Assistant coach Dwayne Lee, who had been on Caputo's staff since 2022, left in May 2026 to join the staff at VCU. In June 2026, Caputo hired Joe Barrer, the former head coach of the Birmingham Squadron of the NBA G League, as an assistant coach.

=== Departures ===
George Washington departures
Name	Number	Pos.	Height	Weight	Year	Hometown	Reason for Departure
Trey Autry	0	G	6'4"	210	Junior	Jamesville, New York	Left the team
Trey Moss	1	G	6'3"	190	(redshirt) Senior	Orlando, Florida	Graduated
Christian Jones	2	G	6'4"	200	(redshirt) Sophomore	Stratford, Connecticut	Left the team
Tre Dinkins	3	G	6'2"	190	Graduate Student	Chester, Pennsylvania	Graduated
Vincent Chaudhri	4	F	6'7"	190	Freshman	Wallkill, New York	Transferred to Wake Forest
Ty Bevins	5	G	6'6"	200	Sophomore	Clinton, Maryland	Left the team
Garrett Johnson	9	G/F	6'8"	220	(redshirt) Junior	Oakton, Virginia	Entered transfer portal
Bubu Benjamin	11	G	6'7"	220	Junior	Medicine Hat, Alberta	Entered transfer portal
Mohamed Binzagr	21	G	6'2"	190	Senior	Jeddah, Saudi Arabia	Graduated
Tyrone Marshall Jr.	24	F	6'8"	215	Graduate Student	Nashville, Tennessee	Graduated
Rafael Castro	30	F	6'11"	220	(redshirt) Senior	Dover, New Jersey	Graduated; signed a two-way contract with the Houston Rockets
Luke Hunger	33	F	6'10"	250	Graduate Student	Montreal, Quebec	Graduated

=== Incoming transfers ===
George Washington incoming transfers
Name	Number	Pos.	Height	Weight	Year	Hometown	Previous School
Omari Witherspoon	0	G	6'6"	225	Sophomore	Bowie, Maryland	Pittsburgh
Aidan Shaw	2	F	6'9"	210	Graduate Student	Overland Park, Kansas	Boston College
Ryder Frost	3	F	6'7"	215	Sophomore	Beverly, Massachusetts	Notre Dame
Felix Kossaras	4	G	6'6"	195	Junior	Montreal, Quebec	Colorado
Malachi Arrington	5	F	6'9"	230	Junior	Somerville, New Jersey	NJIT
Dylan James	11	F	6'9"	225	Senior	Winter Haven, Florida	Georgia
Lovro Urbiha	13	F	6'8"	235	Graduate Student	Ljubljana, Slovenia	Krka Novo Mesto (Slovenia)
Andrija Vukovic	19	F	6'11"	270	Junior	Belgrade, Serbia	Oklahoma State
Andrew Phillips	21	G	6'5"	220	Senior	Chester Springs, Pennsylvania	Lafayette
Terrance Arceneaux	23	G	6'6"	200	Graduate Student	Beaumont, Texas	Houston / NC State

=== 2026 recruiting class ===
George Washington 2026 recruiting class
Name	Number	Pos.	Height	Weight	Hometown	High school
Promis N'Landu	8	G	6'2"	195	Quebec City, Quebec	Fort Erie International Academy
Jayvon Rampersant	10	F	6'8"	215	Brooklyn, New York	Berkmar High School
Deng Manyang	39	F	6'7"	185	Adelaide, Australia	Central District Lions

== Preseason ==
On October 19, 2026, the Atlantic 10 Conference released its preseason poll. George Washington was picked to finish fifth in the conference, and Jean Aranguren was named to the preseason All-A-10 third team.

=== Preseason rankings ===
Atlantic 10 Preseason Poll
Place	Team	Votes
1	VCU	308 (11)
2	Saint Louis	307 (10)
3	Dayton	279 (2)
4	George Mason	240
5	George Washington	207
6	Saint Joseph's	181
7	Fordham	169
8	Davidson	144
9	Richmond	138
10	Duquesne	130
11	Loyola Chicago	116
12	Rhode Island	104
13	La Salle	59
14	St. Bonaventure	33
(#) first-place votes

=== Preseason All-Atlantic 10 Teams ===
Preseason All-Atlantic 10 Teams
Team	Player	Year	Position
Third	Jean Aranguren	Senior	Guard

== Roster ==
2026–27 George Washington Revolutionaries men's basketball team
Players
Coaches

Pos.	#	Name	Height	Weight	Year	Previous school	Hometown
G	0	Omari Witherspoon	6 ft 6 in (1.98 m)	225 lb (102 kg)	So	Pittsburgh	Bowie, Maryland
G	1	Jalen Rougier-Roane	6 ft 4 in (1.93 m)	215 lb (98 kg)	RS Fr	Sidwell Friends School	Bowie, Maryland
F	2	Aidan Shaw	6 ft 9 in (2.06 m)	210 lb (95 kg)	GS	Boston College	Overland Park, Kansas
F	3	Ryder Frost	6 ft 7 in (2.01 m)	215 lb (98 kg)	So	Notre Dame	Beverly, Massachusetts
G	4	Felix Kossaras	6 ft 6 in (1.98 m)	195 lb (88 kg)	Jr	Colorado	Montreal, Quebec
F	5	Malachi Arrington	6 ft 9 in (2.06 m)	230 lb (104 kg)	Jr	NJIT	Somerville, New Jersey
G	7	Jean Aranguren	6 ft 3 in (1.91 m)	200 lb (91 kg)	Sr	Hofstra	Valencia, Venezuela
G	8	Promis N'Landu	6 ft 2 in (1.88 m)	195 lb (88 kg)	Fr	Fort Erie International Academy	Quebec City, Quebec
F	10	Jayvon Rampersant	6 ft 8 in (2.03 m)	215 lb (98 kg)	Fr	Berkmar High School	Brooklyn, New York
F	11	Dylan James	6 ft 9 in (2.06 m)	225 lb (102 kg)	Sr	Georgia	Winter Haven, Florida
F	13	Lovro Urbiha	6 ft 8 in (2.03 m)	235 lb (107 kg)	GS	Krka Novo Mesto	Ljubljana, Slovenia
F	19	Andrija Vukovic	6 ft 11 in (2.11 m)	270 lb (122 kg)	Jr	Oklahoma State	Belgrade, Serbia
G	21	Andrew Phillips	6 ft 5 in (1.96 m)	220 lb (100 kg)	Sr	Lafayette	Chester Springs, Pennsylvania
G	23	Terrance Arceneaux	6 ft 6 in (1.98 m)	200 lb (91 kg)	GS	Houston / NC State	Beaumont, Texas
G	32	Amir Arrington (W)	6 ft 0 in (1.83 m)	190 lb (86 kg)	Sr	The Galloway School	Atlanta, Georgia
F	39	Deng Manyang	6 ft 7 in (2.01 m)	185 lb (84 kg)	Fr	Central District Lions	Adelaide, Australia

Head coach

- Chris Caputo (Westfield State)

Assistant coach(es)

- Lamont Franklin (UNC Wilmington)
- Matt Colpoys (Penn State Behrend)
- Aaron Thompson (Butler)
- Joe Barrer

Legend

- (C) Team captain
- (S) Suspended
- (I) Ineligible
- (W) Walk-on
- Injured
- Current redshirt

Roster
Last update: November 8, 2026

== Schedule and results ==
Date time, TV	Rank^{#}	Opponent^{#}	Result	Record	High points	High rebounds	High assists	Site (attendance) city, state
Exhibition
October 16, 2026*; 6:00 p.m.		Georgetown	L 68–76	–	16 – Witherspoon	8 – Urbiha	4 – Tied	Charles E. Smith Center (4,312); Washington, D.C.
Non-conference regular season
November 2, 2026*; 7:30 p.m., ESPN+		Navy	W 91–39	1–0	14 – Tied	9 – Vukovic	5 – Aranguren	Charles E. Smith Center (2,475); Washington, D.C.
November 7, 2026*; 6:00 p.m., ESPN+		Hampton	W 75–61	2–0	17 – Aranguren	9 – James	4 – Tied	Charles E. Smith Center (1,753); Washington, D.C.
November 10, 2026*; 7:00 p.m., ESPN+		Elon	W 69–50	3–0	13 – Urbiha	13 – James	2 – Tied	Charles E. Smith Center (1,392); Washington, D.C.
November 13, 2026*; 7:00 p.m., ESPN+		Harvard	W 85–57	4–0	16 – Tied	6 – Tied	4 – Aranguren	Charles E. Smith Center (2,801); Washington, D.C.
November 16, 2026*; 12:00 p.m., ESPN+		Ferrum (D-III)	W 94–57	5–0	12 – Witherspoon	9 – Vukovic	6 – N'Landu	Charles E. Smith Center (1,737); Washington, D.C.
November 20, 2026*; 2:00 p.m., CBSSN		vs. UAB; Greenbrier Tip-Off	L 76-81	5-1	20 – Aranguren	9 – Tied	5 – Aranguren	Colonial Hall (568); White Sulphur Springs, WV
November 22, 2026*; 2:00 p.m.		vs. Western Kentucky; Greenbrier Tip-Off						Colonial Hall; White Sulphur Springs, WV
November 27, 2026*; 4:00 p.m., ESPN+		UMBC						Charles E. Smith Center; Washington, D.C.
December 1, 2026*; 7:00 p.m., ESPN+		Southeastern Louisiana						Charles E. Smith Center; Washington, D.C.
December 5, 2026*; 2:00 p.m., ESPN+		LIU						Charles E. Smith Center; Washington, D.C.
December 9, 2026*; 7:00 p.m., ESPN+		American						Charles E. Smith Center; Washington, D.C.
December 12, 2026*; 12:00 p.m., ESPN+		at Boston College						Conte Forum; Chestnut Hill, MA
December 19, 2026*; 6:00 p.m.		vs. San Francisco; Texas Legends College Classic						Comerica Center; Frisco, TX
December 21, 2026*; 6:30 p.m.		vs. Utah State; Texas Legends College Classic						Comerica Center; Frisco, TX
Atlantic 10 regular season
December 30, 2026; 8:00 p.m., ESPN+		at Loyola Chicago						Joseph J. Gentile Arena; Chicago, IL
January 2, 2027; 4:00 p.m.		Saint Joseph's						Charles E. Smith Center; Washington, D.C.
January 6, 2027; 7:00 p.m.		at La Salle						John Glaser Arena; Philadelphia, PA
January 9, 2027; 2:00 p.m.		VCU						Charles E. Smith Center; Washington, D.C.
January 13, 2027; 7:00 p.m.		at Rhode Island						Ryan Center; Kingston, RI
January 18, 2027; 1:00 p.m.		George Mason; Revolutionary Rivalry						Charles E. Smith Center; Washington, D.C.
January 23, 2027; 12:30 p.m.		at St. Bonaventure						Reilly Center; St. Bonaventure, NY
January 27, 2027; 7:00 p.m.		Richmond						Charles E. Smith Center; Washington, D.C.
January 30, 2027; 2:30 p.m.		at Fordham						Rose Hill Gymnasium; Bronx, NY
February 3, 2027; 7:00 p.m.		Duquesne						Charles E. Smith Center; Washington, D.C.
February 6, 2027; 12:00 p.m.		at George Mason; Revolutionary Rivalry						EagleBank Arena; Fairfax, VA
February 10, 2027; 7:00 p.m.		at Richmond						Robins Center; Richmond, VA
February 13, 2027; 6:00 p.m.		La Salle						Charles E. Smith Center; Washington, D.C.
February 16, 2027; 7:00 p.m.		Dayton						Charles E. Smith Center; Washington, D.C.
February 24, 2027; 7:00 p.m.		at Davidson						John M. Belk Arena; Davidson, NC
February 27, 2027; 8:00 p.m., CBSSN		Saint Louis						Charles E. Smith Center; Washington, D.C.
March 2, 2027; 6:00 p.m.		at Dayton						UD Arena; Dayton, OH
March 6, 2027; 4:30 p.m.		Loyola Chicago						Charles E. Smith Center; Washington, D.C.
A-10 tournament
March 10–14, 2027; TBA		vs. TBD						Barclays Center; Brooklyn, NY
*Non-conference game. ^{#}Rankings from AP poll. (#) Tournament seedings in parentheses. All times are in Eastern Time.

== Rankings ==
Ranking movements
	Week																				
Poll	Pre	1	2	3	4	5	6	7	8	9	10	11	12	13	14	15	16	17	18	19	Final
AP																					
Coaches																					
