= 2026–27 Saint Joseph's Hawks men's basketball team =

American college basketball season

2026–27 Saint Joseph's Hawks men's basketball
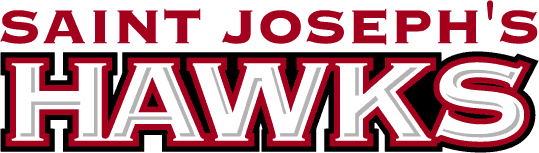
- Conference: Atlantic 10 Conference
- Record: 5–1 (0–0 A–10)
- Head coach: Steve Donahue (2nd season)
- Assistant coaches: Bino Ranson; Thomas Boyle; Dwayne Jones; Chris Flegler; Phillip Lawrence-Ricks
- Home arena: Hagan Arena

2026–27 Atlantic 10 men's basketball standings
	Conf.				Overall
Team	W		L	PCT	W		L	PCT
Duquesne	0	–	0	–	5	–	0	1.000
Saint Joseph's	0	–	0	–	5	–	0	1.000
George Washington	0	–	0	–	5	–	1	.833
Rhode Island	0	–	0	–	5	–	1	.833
Fordham	0	–	0	–	4	–	1	.800
George Mason	0	–	0	–	4	–	1	.800
St. Bonaventure	0	–	0	–	4	–	1	.800
Saint Louis	0	–	0	–	3	–	1	.750
VCU	0	–	0	–	3	–	1	.750
Davidson	0	–	0	–	3	–	2	.600
Loyola Chicago	0	–	0	–	3	–	2	.600
Dayton	0	–	0	–	3	–	3	.500
Richmond	0	–	0	–	3	–	3	.500
La Salle	0	–	0	–	2	–	3	.400
† 2027 A-10 tournament winner As of November 21, 2026; Rankings from AP poll

The 2026–27 Saint Joseph's Hawks men's basketball team represents Saint Joseph's University during the 2026–27 NCAA Division I men's basketball season. The Hawks, led by second-year head coach Steve Donahue, play their home games at Hagan Arena in Philadelphia, Pennsylvania, as a member of the Atlantic 10 Conference.

== Previous season ==
The Hawks finished the 2025–26 season 24–12, 13–5 in A-10 play. As the No. 3 seed in the A-10 tournament, they defeated Davidson 70–58 in the quarterfinals before losing to VCU 77–64 in the semifinals. They received a bid to the NIT, where they defeated Colorado State and California on the road before losing at New Mexico 84–69 in the quarterfinals.

== Offseason ==
=== Departures ===
Saint Joseph's departures
Name	Number	Pos.	Height	Weight	Year	Hometown	Reason for Departure
Derek Simpson	0	G	6'3"	175	Senior	Mount Laurel, New Jersey	Graduated
Kevin Kearney	1	F	6'7"	195	(redshirt) Freshman	Brooklyn, New York	Left the team
Deuce Jones II	2	G	6'2"	170	Sophomore	Trenton, New Jersey	Transferred to UAB
Anthony Finkley	5	F	6'7"	235	Junior	Philadelphia, Pennsylvania	Transferred to La Salle
Dasear Haskins	7	G	6'8"	200	(redshirt) Sophomore	Willingboro, New Jersey	Transferred to Ole Miss
Jaden Smith	10	C	6'11"	225	Sophomore	Chicago, Illinois	Transferred to Ball State
Steven Solano	15	C	7'0"	260	(redshirt) Freshman	Bronx, New York	Left the team
Al Amadou	21	F	6'9"	205	(redshirt) Sophomore	Philadelphia, Pennsylvania	Transferred to Milwaukee
Justice Ajogbor	22	C	6'10"	260	Graduate Student	Benin City, Nigeria	Graduated

=== Incoming transfers ===
Saint Joseph's incoming transfers
Name	Number	Pos.	Height	Weight	Year	Hometown	Previous School
Logan Carey	0	G	6'3"	182	Senior	Shelton, Connecticut	Maine
Luis Nonfon	8	F	6'7"	227	Junior	Berlin, Germany	Augusta
Sean Logan	15	F	6'11"	240	Graduate Student	Westfield, New Jersey	Davidson
Donovan Flamer	22	F	6'9"	211	Sophomore	Baltimore, Maryland	Elizabeth City State
Gavin Marrs	23	F	7'0"	215	Senior	Ellensburg, Washington	Oregon State

=== 2026 recruiting class ===
Saint Joseph's 2026 recruiting class
Name	Number	Pos.	Height	Weight	Hometown	High school
BJ Ranson	7	G	6'3"	165	Baltimore, Maryland	Mount St. Joseph
Keoni Sacco	10	F	6'10"	220	Vancouver, British Columbia	Fork Union Military Academy
Davis Kemper	21	F	6'9"	217	Byron Center, Michigan	AIA Prep

== Preseason ==
On October 19, 2026, the Atlantic 10 Conference released its preseason poll. Saint Joseph's was picked to finish sixth in the conference. Jaiden Glover-Toscano was named to the preseason All-A-10 first team, and Sean Logan was named to the preseason All-Defensive team.

=== Preseason rankings ===
Atlantic 10 Preseason Poll
Place	Team	Votes
1	VCU	308 (11)
2	Saint Louis	307 (10)
3	Dayton	279 (2)
4	George Mason	240
5	George Washington	207
6	Saint Joseph's	181
7	Fordham	169
8	Davidson	144
9	Richmond	138
10	Duquesne	130
11	Loyola Chicago	116
12	Rhode Island	104
13	La Salle	59
14	St. Bonaventure	33
(#) first-place votes

=== Preseason All-Atlantic 10 Teams ===
Preseason All-Atlantic 10 Teams
Team	Player	Year	Position
First	Jaiden Glover-Toscano	Junior	Guard
All-Defensive	Sean Logan	Graduate student	Forward

== Roster ==
2026–27 Saint Joseph's Hawks men's basketball team
Players
Coaches

Pos.	#	Name	Height	Weight	Year	Previous school	Hometown
G	0	Logan Carey	6 ft 3 in (1.91 m)	182 lb (83 kg)	Sr	Maine	Shelton, Connecticut
G	1	Mekai Johnson	6 ft 5 in (1.96 m)	211 lb (96 kg)	Jr	Bishop Ireton High School	Upper Marlboro, Maryland
G	3	Khaafiq Myers	5 ft 10 in (1.78 m)	160 lb (73 kg)	Jr	Neumann Goretti High School	Philadelphia, Pennsylvania
G	6	Owen Verna	6 ft 3 in (1.91 m)	198 lb (90 kg)	So	Mater Dei High School	Dana Point, California
G	7	BJ Ranson	6 ft 3 in (1.91 m)	165 lb (75 kg)	Fr	Mount St. Joseph	Baltimore, Maryland
F	8	Luis Nonfon	6 ft 7 in (2.01 m)	227 lb (103 kg)	Jr	Augusta	Berlin, Germany
F	10	Keoni Sacco	6 ft 10 in (2.08 m)	220 lb (100 kg)	Fr	Fork Union Military Academy	Vancouver, British Columbia
G	11	Jaiden Glover-Toscano	6 ft 6 in (1.98 m)	206 lb (93 kg)	Jr	St. John's	Brooklyn, New York
G	13	Austin Williford	6 ft 4 in (1.93 m)	192 lb (87 kg)	So	St. Anne's-Belfield School	Charlottesville, Virginia
F	15	Sean Logan	6 ft 11 in (2.11 m)	240 lb (109 kg)	GS	Davidson	Westfield, New Jersey
G	20	Billy Rayer	5 ft 11 in (1.8 m)	192 lb (87 kg)	Jr	Haverford School	Ardmore, Pennsylvania
F	21	Davis Kemper	6 ft 9 in (2.06 m)	217 lb (98 kg)	Fr	AIA Prep	Byron Center, Michigan
F	22	Donovan Flamer	6 ft 9 in (2.06 m)	211 lb (96 kg)	So	Elizabeth City State	Baltimore, Maryland
F	23	Gavin Marrs	7 ft 0 in (2.13 m)	215 lb (98 kg)	Sr	Oregon State	Ellensburg, Washington
G/F	24	Will Lange	6 ft 5 in (1.96 m)	217 lb (98 kg)	Sr	Shipley School	Newtown Square, Pennsylvania

Head coach

- Steve Donahue (Ursinus)

Assistant coach(es)

- Bino Ranson (Southern New Hampshire)
- Thomas Boyle (Saint Joseph's)
- Dwayne Jones (Saint Joseph's)
- Chris Flegler (Livingstone)
- Phillip Lawrence-Ricks

Legend

- (C) Team captain
- (S) Suspended
- (I) Ineligible
- (W) Walk-on
- Injured
- Current redshirt

Roster
Last update: November 8, 2026

== Schedule and results ==
Date time, TV	Rank^{#}	Opponent^{#}	Result	Record	High points	High rebounds	High assists	Site (attendance) city, state
Non-conference regular season
November 4, 2026*; 7:00 p.m., ESPN+		Longwood	W 82–73	1–0	22 – Glover-Toscano	9 – Williford	7 – Logan	Hagan Arena (2,754); Philadelphia, PA
November 7, 2026*; 4:00 p.m., ESPN+		Lafayette	W 67–57 ^{OT}	2–0	24 – Myers	11 – Logan	4 – Myers	Hagan Arena (2,050); Philadelphia, PA
November 11, 2026*; 3:00 p.m., CBSSN		vs. South Florida; Veterans Classic	W 83–80	3–0	21 – Ranson	6 – Sacco	6 – Myers	Alumni Hall; Annapolis, MD
November 14, 2026*; 6:30 p.m., ESPN+		Penn	W 83–77	4–0	30 – Myers	8 – Glover-Toscano	8 – Myers	Hagan Arena (3,078); Philadelphia, PA
November 17, 2026*; 7:00 p.m., ESPN+		Wagner	W 84–65	5–0	17 – Myers	6 – Ranson	3 – Tied	Hagan Arena (1,858); Philadelphia, PA
November 20, 2026*; 7:00 p.m., FloHoops		at Drexel; Big 5 Classic Pod 2	L 64-75	5-1	15 – Ranson	7 – Logan	4 – Myers	Daskalakis Athletic Center; Philadelphia, PA
November 25, 2026*; 12:00 p.m., ESPN+		Penn State Abington (D-III)						Hagan Arena; Philadelphia, PA
November 28, 2026*; 5:00 p.m., NBCSP+		at Monmouth						OceanFirst Bank Center; West Long Branch, NJ
December 5, 2026*; TBA		vs. TBD; Big 5 Classic						Xfinity Mobile Arena; Philadelphia, PA
December 8, 2026*; 7:00 p.m., ESPN+		Boston University						Hagan Arena; Philadelphia, PA
December 16, 2026*; 7:00 p.m., ESPN+		Maryland Eastern Shore						Hagan Arena; Philadelphia, PA
December 19, 2026*; 2:00 p.m., ESPN+		Coppin State						Hagan Arena; Philadelphia, PA
December 22, 2026*; 7:00 p.m.		vs. Penn State						Giant Center; Hershey, PA
Atlantic 10 regular season
December 30, 2026; 7:00 p.m., ESPN+		Rhode Island						Hagan Arena; Philadelphia, PA
January 2, 2027; 4:00 p.m., ESPN+		at George Washington						Charles E. Smith Center; Washington, D.C.
January 6, 2027; 7:00 p.m., ESPN+		at St. Bonaventure						Reilly Center; St. Bonaventure, NY
January 9, 2027; 4:30 p.m., USA		George Mason						Hagan Arena; Philadelphia, PA
January 13, 2027; 7:00 p.m., ESPN+		at Fordham						Rose Hill Gymnasium; Bronx, NY
January 18, 2027; 3:00 p.m., CBSSN		VCU						Hagan Arena; Philadelphia, PA
January 23, 2027; 8:00 p.m., CBSSN		Saint Louis						Hagan Arena; Philadelphia, PA
January 27, 2027; 7:00 p.m., ESPN+		at Davidson						John M. Belk Arena; Davidson, NC
January 30, 2027; 4:30 p.m., USA		at George Mason						EagleBank Arena; Fairfax, VA
February 6, 2027; 12:30 p.m., USA		La Salle						Hagan Arena; Philadelphia, PA
February 9, 2027; 7:00 p.m., ESPN+		Fordham						Hagan Arena; Philadelphia, PA
February 12, 2027; 7:00 p.m., ESPN2		at Saint Louis						Chaifetz Arena; St. Louis, MO
February 16, 2027; 7:00 p.m., ESPN+		Loyola Chicago						Hagan Arena; Philadelphia, PA
February 19, 2027; 5:00 p.m., ESPN2		at Dayton						UD Arena; Dayton, OH
February 24, 2027; 7:00 p.m., ESPN+		at Duquesne						UPMC Cooper Fieldhouse; Pittsburgh, PA
February 27, 2027; 2:30 p.m., USA		Davidson						Hagan Arena; Philadelphia, PA
March 3, 2027; 7:00 p.m., ESPN+		Richmond						Hagan Arena; Philadelphia, PA
March 6, 2027; 4:00 p.m., ESPN+		at La Salle						John Glaser Arena; Philadelphia, PA
A-10 tournament
March 10–14, 2027; TBA		vs. TBD						Barclays Center; Brooklyn, NY
*Non-conference game. ^{#}Rankings from AP poll. (#) Tournament seedings in parentheses. All times are in Eastern Time.
