= 2026–27 Rhode Island Rams men's basketball team =

American college basketball season

2026–27 Rhode Island Rams men's basketball
- Conference: Atlantic 10 Conference
- Record: 5–1 (0–0 A–10)
- Head coach: Archie Miller (5th season)
- Assistant coaches: James Whitford; Duane Woodward; Austin Carroll; Chandler Graves
- Home arena: Ryan Center

2026–27 Atlantic 10 men's basketball standings
| | Conf. | | | | Overall |
| Team | W | | L | PCT | W | | L | PCT |
|---|---|---|---|---|---|---|---|---|
| Duquesne | 0 | – | 0 | – | 5 | – | 0 | 1.000 |
| George Washington | 0 | – | 0 | – | 5 | – | 1 | .833 |
| Rhode Island | 0 | – | 0 | – | 5 | – | 1 | .833 |
| Saint Joseph's | 0 | – | 0 | – | 5 | – | 1 | .833 |
| Fordham | 0 | – | 0 | – | 4 | – | 1 | .800 |
| George Mason | 0 | – | 0 | – | 4 | – | 1 | .800 |
| St. Bonaventure | 0 | – | 0 | – | 4 | – | 1 | .800 |
| Saint Louis | 0 | – | 0 | – | 3 | – | 1 | .750 |
| VCU | 0 | – | 0 | – | 3 | – | 1 | .750 |
| Davidson | 0 | – | 0 | – | 3 | – | 2 | .600 |
| Loyola Chicago | 0 | – | 0 | – | 3 | – | 2 | .600 |
| Dayton | 0 | – | 0 | – | 3 | – | 3 | .500 |
| Richmond | 0 | – | 0 | – | 3 | – | 3 | .500 |
| La Salle | 0 | – | 0 | – | 2 | – | 3 | .400 |
† 2027 A-10 tournament winner As of November 21, 2026; Rankings from AP poll

The 2026–27 Rhode Island Rams men's basketball team represents the University of Rhode Island during the 2026–27 NCAA Division I men's basketball season. The Rams, led by fifth-year head coach Archie Miller, play their home games at the Ryan Center in Kingston, Rhode Island, as a member of the Atlantic 10 Conference.

== Previous season ==
The Rams finished the 2025–26 season 16–16, 7–11 in A-10 play. As the No. 10 seed in the A-10 tournament, they lost to No. 7 seed Duquesne 67–61 in the second round.

== Offseason ==
Rhode Island returned six scholarship players from the 2025–26 team, including starters Jonah Hinton and Jahmere Tripp. Forward Mouhamed Sow was granted a medical waiver by the NCAA for a sixth season of eligibility.

=== Departures ===
Rhode Island departures
| Name | Number | Pos. | Height | Weight | Year | Hometown | Reason for Departure |
|---|---|---|---|---|---|---|---|
| Alex Crawford | 8 | F | 6'8" | 215 | (redshirt) Senior | Chula Vista, California | Graduated |
| Moek Icke | 17 | C | 7'1" | 223 | (redshirt) Freshman | Purmerend, Netherlands | Walk-on; left the team |
| Myles Corey | 20 | G | 6'1" | 180 | Graduate Student | Ontario, California | Graduated |
| Damone King | 21 | G | 6'2" | 180 | (redshirt) Freshman | Louisville, Kentucky | Transferred to Eastern Kentucky |
| RJ Johnson | 22 | G | 6'1" | 177 | Graduate Student | Matthews, North Carolina | Graduated; joined staff as graduate assistant |
| Tyler Cochran | 23 | G | 6'4" | 222 | Graduate Student | Bolingbrook, Illinois | Graduated |
| Jimmy Ball | 30 | G | 6'2" | 183 | Senior | Medford, Massachusetts | Graduated |
| Keeyan Itejere | 40 | F | 6'9" | 220 | Graduate Student | Knightdale, North Carolina | Graduated |
| Drissa Traore | 55 | F | 6'8" | 220 | (redshirt) Senior | New York, New York | Graduated |

=== Incoming transfers ===
Rhode Island incoming transfers
| Name | Number | Pos. | Height | Weight | Year | Hometown | Previous School |
|---|---|---|---|---|---|---|---|
| Jason Fontenet II | 1 | G/F | 6'6" | 205 | Senior | Phoenix, Arizona | UC Santa Barbara |
| Dylan Williamson | 4 | G | 6'1" | 180 | Graduate Student | Upper Marlboro, Maryland | Towson |
| Matas Deniusas | 44 | F | 6'9" | 220 | Sophomore | Vilnius, Lithuania | UT Martin |

=== 2026 recruiting class ===
Rhode Island 2026 recruiting class
| Name | Number | Pos. | Height | Weight | Hometown | High school |
|---|---|---|---|---|---|---|
| Jaen Chatman | 2 | G | 6'1" | 200 | East Stroudsburg, Pennsylvania | Blair Academy |
| Steven Sherman | 6 | G | 6'2" | 160 | La Vergne, Tennessee | Ensworth School |
| Nedas Raupelis | 9 | F | 6'10" | 231 | Vilnius, Lithuania | Žalgiris II |
| Tim Martin II | 14 | F | 6'8" | 210 | Cincinnati, Ohio | Summit Country Day School |
| Dashiell Mabilon | 31 | F | 6'10" | 225 | Brooklyn, New York | Canterbury School |

== Preseason ==
On October 19, 2026, the Atlantic 10 Conference released its preseason poll. Rhode Island was picked to finish 12th in the conference, and Jonah Hinton and Jahmere Tripp were both named to the preseason All-A-10 third team.

=== Preseason rankings ===
Atlantic 10 Preseason Poll
| Place | Team | Votes |
|---|---|---|
| 1 | VCU | 308 (11) |
| 2 | Saint Louis | 307 (10) |
| 3 | Dayton | 279 (2) |
| 4 | George Mason | 240 |
| 5 | George Washington | 207 |
| 6 | Saint Joseph's | 181 |
| 7 | Fordham | 169 |
| 8 | Davidson | 144 |
| 9 | Richmond | 138 |
| 10 | Duquesne | 130 |
| 11 | Loyola Chicago | 116 |
| 12 | Rhode Island | 104 |
| 13 | La Salle | 59 |
| 14 | St. Bonaventure | 33 |
(#) first-place votes

=== Preseason All-Atlantic 10 Teams ===
Preseason All-Atlantic 10 Teams
| Team | Player | Year | Position |
|---|---|---|---|
| Third | Jonah Hinton | Graduate student | Guard |
| Third | Jahmere Tripp | Senior | Guard/Forward |

== Roster ==
2026–27 Rhode Island Rams men's basketball team
Players
Coaches

| Pos. | # | Name | Height | Weight | Year | Previous school | Hometown |
|---|---|---|---|---|---|---|---|
| G/F | 0 | Jahmere Tripp | 6 ft 6 in (1.98 m) | 234 lb (106 kg) | Sr | Fordham | Brooklyn, New York |
| G/F | 1 | Jason Fontenet II | 6 ft 6 in (1.98 m) | 205 lb (93 kg) | Sr | UC Santa Barbara | Phoenix, Arizona |
| G | 2 | Jaen Chatman | 6 ft 1 in (1.85 m) | 200 lb (91 kg) | Fr | Blair Academy | East Stroudsburg, Pennsylvania |
| G | 4 | Dylan Williamson | 6 ft 1 in (1.85 m) | 180 lb (82 kg) | GS | Towson | Upper Marlboro, Maryland |
| G | 5 | Jonah Hinton | 6 ft 3 in (1.91 m) | 200 lb (91 kg) | GS | St. Bonaventure | Chicago, Illinois |
| G | 6 | Steven Sherman | 6 ft 2 in (1.88 m) | 160 lb (73 kg) | Fr | Ensworth School | La Vergne, Tennessee |
| G | 7 | Jalen Harper | 6 ft 3 in (1.91 m) | 190 lb (86 kg) | So | St. Joe's Prep | Philadelphia, Pennsylvania |
| F | 9 | Nedas Raupelis | 6 ft 10 in (2.08 m) | 231 lb (105 kg) | So | Žalgiris II | Vilnius, Lithuania |
| G | 10 | Barrett Loer | 6 ft 6 in (1.98 m) | 190 lb (86 kg) | So | St. George's School | Millis, Massachusetts |
| F | 11 | Javon Perry | 6 ft 8 in (2.03 m) | 207 lb (94 kg) | So | MacDuffie School | Springfield, Massachusetts |
| G | 13 | Jaymien Aponte (W) | 6 ft 3 in (1.91 m) | 183 lb (83 kg) | Jr | Cranston High School West | Cranston, Rhode Island |
| F | 14 | Tim Martin II | 6 ft 8 in (2.03 m) | 210 lb (95 kg) | Fr | Summit Country Day School | Cincinnati, Ohio |
| F | 31 | Dashiell Mabilon | 6 ft 10 in (2.08 m) | 225 lb (102 kg) | Fr | Canterbury School | Brooklyn, New York |
| F | 35 | Mouhamed Sow | 6 ft 9 in (2.06 m) | 217 lb (98 kg) | GS | Saint Peter's | Dakar, Senegal |
| F | 44 | Matas Deniusas | 6 ft 9 in (2.06 m) | 220 lb (100 kg) | So | UT Martin | Vilnius, Lithuania |

Head coach

- Archie Miller (NC State)

Assistant coach(es)

- James Whitford (Wisconsin)
- Duane Woodward (Boston College)
- Austin Carroll (American)
- Chandler Graves (Indiana)

Legend

- (C) Team captain
- (S) Suspended
- (I) Ineligible
- (W) Walk-on
- Injured
- Current redshirt

Roster
Last update: November 8, 2026

== Schedule and results ==
| Date time, TV | Rank^{#} | Opponent^{#} | Result | Record | High points | High rebounds | High assists | Site (attendance) city, state |
Exhibition
| October 11, 2026*; 3:00 p.m. | | at UMass | L 68–81 | – | 18 – Fontenet II | 8 – Hinton | 5 – Chatman | Mullins Center; Amherst, MA |
| October 27, 2026*; 7:00 p.m. | | Southern New Hampshire (D-II) | W 101–61 | – | 20 – Deniusas | 16 – Deniusas | 4 – Tripp | Ryan Center (2,215); Kingston, RI |
Non-conference regular season
| November 3, 2026*; 7:00 p.m. | | Holy Cross | W 103–59 | 1–0 | 24 – Hinton | 8 – Deniusas | 6 – Fontenet II | Ryan Center (3,240); Kingston, RI |
| November 7, 2026*; 4:00 p.m., NESN | | vs. Monmouth; Hall of Fame Tip-Off | W 84–66 | 2–0 | 15 – Tied | 9 – Fontenet II | 3 – Williamson | Mohegan Sun Arena; Uncasville, CT |
| November 10, 2026*; 7:00 p.m., ESPN+ | | Maine | W 71–65 | 3–0 | 18 – Williamson | 12 – Fontenet II | 5 – Williamson | Ryan Center (2,797); Kingston, RI |
| November 12, 2026*; 7:00 p.m., ESPN+ | | Maryland Eastern Shore | W 67–47 | 4–0 | 18 – Williamson | 12 – Deniusas | 3 – Chatman | Ryan Center (2,621); Kingston, RI |
| November 15, 2026*; 2:00 p.m., ESPN+ | | Princeton | W 79–72 | 5–0 | 21 – Hinton | 7 – Deniusas | 2 – Fontenet II | Ryan Center (2,664); Kingston, RI |
| November 20, 2026*; 4:30 p.m., CBSSN | | vs. Liberty; Greenbrier Tip-Off | L 68–71 | 5-1 | 13 – Hinton | 14 – Raupelis | 4 – Tripp | Colonial Hall; White Sulphur Springs, WV |
| November 22, 2026*; 7:00 p.m. | | vs. UAB; Greenbrier Tip-Off | | | | | | Colonial Hall; White Sulphur Springs, WV |
| November 25, 2026*; 1:00 p.m., ESPN+ | | American International (D-II) | | | | | | Ryan Center; Kingston, RI |
| December 1, 2026*; 7:00 p.m., ESPN+ | | Brown | | | | | | Ryan Center; Kingston, RI |
| December 5, 2026*; 12:00 p.m. | | Providence | | | | | | Ryan Center; Kingston, RI |
| December 12, 2026*; 1:00 p.m. | | at Tulane | | | | | | Devlin Fieldhouse; New Orleans, LA |
| December 19, 2026*; 1:00 p.m., FloCollege | | at Northeastern | | | | | | Cabot Physical Education Center; Boston, MA |
| December 22, 2026*; 6:00 p.m., ESPN+ | | Buffalo | | | | | | Ryan Center; Kingston, RI |
Atlantic 10 regular season
| December 30, 2026; 7:00 p.m., ESPN+ | | at Saint Joseph's | | | | | | Hagan Arena; Philadelphia, PA |
| January 2, 2027; 4:30 p.m. | | George Mason | | | | | | Ryan Center; Kingston, RI |
| January 6, 2027; 7:00 p.m. | | at Duquesne | | | | | | UPMC Cooper Fieldhouse; Pittsburgh, PA |
| January 9, 2027; 1:00 p.m. | | La Salle | | | | | | Ryan Center; Kingston, RI |
| January 13, 2027; 7:00 p.m. | | George Washington | | | | | | Ryan Center; Kingston, RI |
| January 16, 2027; 4:30 p.m. | | at Richmond | | | | | | Robins Center; Richmond, VA |
| January 23, 2027; 1:00 p.m. | | Duquesne | | | | | | Ryan Center; Kingston, RI |
| January 26, 2027; 7:00 p.m., CBSSN | | at Saint Louis | | | | | | Chaifetz Arena; St. Louis, MO |
| January 30, 2027; 2:00 p.m. | | at La Salle | | | | | | John Glaser Arena; Philadelphia, PA |
| February 3, 2027; 7:00 p.m. | | Fordham | | | | | | Ryan Center; Kingston, RI |
| February 7, 2027; 2:00 p.m. | | Davidson | | | | | | Ryan Center; Kingston, RI |
| February 10, 2027; 7:00 p.m. | | at VCU | | | | | | Siegel Center; Richmond, VA |
| February 13, 2027; 4:00 p.m. | | at Loyola Chicago | | | | | | Joseph J. Gentile Arena; Chicago, IL |
| February 17, 2027; 7:00 p.m. | | Richmond | | | | | | Ryan Center; Kingston, RI |
| February 20, 2027; 2:00 p.m. | | at Fordham | | | | | | Rose Hill Gymnasium; Bronx, NY |
| February 27, 2027; 6:00 p.m. | | Dayton | | | | | | Ryan Center; Kingston, RI |
| March 3, 2027; 7:00 p.m. | | at George Mason | | | | | | EagleBank Arena; Fairfax, VA |
| March 6, 2027; 1:00 p.m. | | St. Bonaventure | | | | | | Ryan Center; Kingston, RI |
A-10 tournament
| March 10–14, 2027; TBA | | vs. TBD | | | | | | Barclays Center; Brooklyn, NY |
*Non-conference game. ^{#}Rankings from AP poll. (#) Tournament seedings in parentheses. All times are in Eastern Time.

== Rankings ==
Ranking movements
| | Week | | | | | | | | | | | | | | | | | | | | |
| Poll | Pre | 1 | 2 | 3 | 4 | 5 | 6 | 7 | 8 | 9 | 10 | 11 | 12 | 13 | 14 | 15 | 16 | 17 | 18 | 19 | Final |
|---|---|---|---|---|---|---|---|---|---|---|---|---|---|---|---|---|---|---|---|---|---|
| AP | | | | | | | | | | | | | | | | | | | | | |
| Coaches | | | | | | | | | | | | | | | | | | | | | |
