= 2026–27 La Salle Explorers men's basketball team =

American college basketball season

2026–27 La Salle Explorers men's basketball
- Conference: Atlantic 10 Conference
- Record: 1–3 (0–0 A–10)
- Head coach: Darris Nichols (2nd season)
- Assistant coaches: Shane Nichols; Colin Curtin; James Haring; Safet Kastrat; Andrew Lafond
- Home arena: John Glaser Arena

2026–27 Atlantic 10 men's basketball standings
	Conf.				Overall
Team	W		L	PCT	W		L	PCT
Duquesne	0	–	0	–	5	–	0	1.000
George Washington	0	–	0	–	5	–	1	.833
Rhode Island	0	–	0	–	5	–	1	.833
Saint Joseph's	0	–	0	–	5	–	1	.833
Fordham	0	–	0	–	4	–	1	.800
George Mason	0	–	0	–	4	–	1	.800
St. Bonaventure	0	–	0	–	4	–	1	.800
VCU	0	–	0	–	3	–	1	.750
Davidson	0	–	0	–	3	–	2	.600
Loyola Chicago	0	–	0	–	3	–	2	.600
Saint Louis	0	–	0	–	3	–	2	.600
Dayton	0	–	0	–	3	–	3	.500
Richmond	0	–	0	–	3	–	3	.500
La Salle	0	–	0	–	2	–	3	.400
† 2027 A-10 tournament winner As of November 22, 2026; Rankings from AP poll

The 2026–27 La Salle Explorers men's basketball team represents La Salle University during the 2026–27 NCAA Division I men's basketball season. The Explorers, led by second-year head coach Darris Nichols, play their home games at John Glaser Arena in Philadelphia, Pennsylvania, as a member of the Atlantic 10 Conference.

== Previous season ==
The Explorers finished the 2025–26 season 9–23, 5–13 in A-10 play. As the No. 12 seed in the A-10 tournament, they lost to No. 13 seed St. Bonaventure 99–80 in the first round.

== Offseason ==
Leading scorer Rob Dockery, who had entered the transfer portal, announced in March 2026 that he would return to La Salle, and forward Noah Collier re-signed for the 2026–27 season.

=== Departures ===
La Salle departures
Name	Number	Pos.	Height	Weight	Year	Hometown	Reason for Departure
Justin Archer	0	F	6'7"	210	Graduate Student	New Brunswick, New Jersey	Graduated
Ashton Walker	1	G	6'5"	190	Freshman	Virginia Beach, Virginia	Left the team
Jaeden Marshall	2	G	6'5"	205	Graduate Student	Hinesville, Georgia	Graduated
Eric Acker	3	G	6'2"	170	Junior	East New York, New York	Left the team
Truth Harris	4	G	6'2"	180	Graduate Student	Mount Vernon, New York	Graduated
Josiah Harris	5	F	6'9"	225	Graduate Student	Wilmington, Delaware	Graduated
Nas Hart	8	F	6'10"	195	Freshman	Trenton, New Jersey	Left the team
Josué Grullon	11	G	6'5"	195	Senior	Santo Domingo, Dominican Republic	Graduated
Damon Strand	12	G	6'3"	195	Senior	Plainfield, New Jersey	Graduated
Edwin Daniel	27	F	6'9"	215	Junior	Washington Heights, New York	Left the team

=== Incoming transfers ===
La Salle incoming transfers
Name	Number	Pos.	Height	Weight	Year	Hometown	Previous School
Kam Burton	0	G	6'3"	200	Senior	Houston, Texas	Stephen F. Austin
Devin Booker	4	G	6'4"	180	Sophomore	Philadelphia, Pennsylvania	George Mason
Anthony Finkley	5	F	6'7"	235	Senior	Philadelphia, Pennsylvania	Saint Joseph's
Trey Moss	8	G	6'3"	200	Graduate Student	Orlando, Florida	George Washington
Vice Zanki	11	F	6'8"	215	Senior	Zagreb, Croatia	Niagara
Francois Nkoy-Eale	12	F	6'11"	225	Junior	Cork, Ireland	New Mexico Junior College
Eunique Rink	14	F	6'10"	240	Junior	Newark, New Jersey	Hampton
Jamison Lynam	30	G	5'10"	165	Junior	Lorton, Virginia	Arcadia

=== 2026 recruiting class ===
La Salle 2026 recruiting class
Name	Number	Pos.	Height	Weight	Hometown	High school
RJ Smith	3	G	5'9"	170	Philadelphia, Pennsylvania	Roman Catholic High School
Breylon Webb	21	G	6'7"	185	Seattle, Washington	Western Reserve Academy
Jay Nelson Mboudjika	23	F	6'10"	220	Douala, Cameroon	CATS Academy

== Preseason ==
On October 19, 2026, the Atlantic 10 Conference released its preseason poll. La Salle was picked to finish 13th in the conference, and Rob Dockery was named to the preseason All-A-10 second team.

=== Preseason rankings ===
Atlantic 10 Preseason Poll
Place	Team	Votes
1	VCU	308 (11)
2	Saint Louis	307 (10)
3	Dayton	279 (2)
4	George Mason	240
5	George Washington	207
6	Saint Joseph's	181
7	Fordham	169
8	Davidson	144
9	Richmond	138
10	Duquesne	130
11	Loyola Chicago	116
12	Rhode Island	104
13	La Salle	59
14	St. Bonaventure	33
(#) first-place votes

=== Preseason All-Atlantic 10 Teams ===
Preseason All-Atlantic 10 Teams
Team	Player	Year	Position
Second	Rob Dockery	Junior	Guard

== Roster ==
2026–27 La Salle Explorers men's basketball team
Players
Coaches

Pos.	#	Name	Height	Weight	Year	Previous school	Hometown
G	0	Kam Burton	6 ft 3 in (1.91 m)	200 lb (91 kg)	Sr	Stephen F. Austin	Houston, Texas
G	2	Rob Dockery	6 ft 6 in (1.98 m)	210 lb (95 kg)	RS Jr	Texas A&M	Washington, D.C.
G	3	RJ Smith	5 ft 9 in (1.75 m)	170 lb (77 kg)	Fr	Roman Catholic High School	Philadelphia, Pennsylvania
G	4	Devin Booker	6 ft 4 in (1.93 m)	180 lb (82 kg)	So	George Mason	Philadelphia, Pennsylvania
F	5	Anthony Finkley	6 ft 7 in (2.01 m)	235 lb (107 kg)	Sr	Saint Joseph's	Philadelphia, Pennsylvania
F	7	Noah Collier	6 ft 9 in (2.06 m)	220 lb (100 kg)	GS	William & Mary	Mullica Hill, New Jersey
G	8	Trey Moss	6 ft 3 in (1.91 m)	200 lb (91 kg)	GS	George Washington	Orlando, Florida
G	10	Jaden Johnson	6 ft 2 in (1.88 m)	210 lb (95 kg)	Jr	Old Dominion	Walker Mill, Maryland
F	11	Vice Zanki	6 ft 8 in (2.03 m)	215 lb (98 kg)	Sr	Niagara	Zagreb, Croatia
F	12	Francois Nkoy-Eale	6 ft 11 in (2.11 m)	225 lb (102 kg)	Jr	New Mexico Junior College	Cork, Ireland
F	13	Max Lipacis	6 ft 7 in (2.01 m)	210 lb (95 kg)	Sr	Drexel	Piedmont, California
F	14	Eunique Rink	6 ft 10 in (2.08 m)	240 lb (109 kg)	Jr	Hampton	Newark, New Jersey
G	21	Breylon Webb	6 ft 7 in (2.01 m)	185 lb (84 kg)	Fr	Western Reserve Academy	Seattle, Washington
F	23	Jay Nelson Mboudjika	6 ft 10 in (2.08 m)	220 lb (100 kg)	Fr	CATS Academy	Douala, Cameroon
F	24	Jerome Brewer Jr.	6 ft 9 in (2.06 m)	220 lb (100 kg)	GS	McNeese	Camden, New Jersey
F	25	Bowyn Beatty	7 ft 0 in (2.13 m)	250 lb (113 kg)	Sr	Sacramento State	Canberra, Australia
G	28	Arlan Masharaliyev	6 ft 0 in (1.83 m)	175 lb (79 kg)	So	Prolific Prep	Almaty, Kazakhstan
G	30	Jamison Lynam	5 ft 10 in (1.78 m)	165 lb (75 kg)	Jr	Arcadia	Lorton, Virginia

Head coach

- Darris Nichols (West Virginia)

Assistant coach(es)

- Shane Nichols (Wofford)
- Colin Curtin (Niagara)
- James Haring (West Virginia)
- Safet Kastrat (Rider)
- Andrew Lafond

Legend

- (C) Team captain
- (S) Suspended
- (I) Ineligible
- (W) Walk-on
- Injured
- Current redshirt

Roster
Last update: November 8, 2026

== Schedule and results ==
Date time, TV	Rank^{#}	Opponent^{#}	Result	Record	High points	High rebounds	High assists	Site (attendance) city, state
Exhibition
October 27, 2026*; 7:00 p.m.		Neumann (D-III)	W 107–61	–	21 – Dockery	9 – Finkley	6 – Smith	John Glaser Arena (743); Philadelphia, PA
Non-conference regular season
November 2, 2026*; 9:00 p.m., CBSSN		at No. 10 Houston	L 55–94	0–1	15 – Burton	7 – Beatty	5 – Smith	Fertitta Center (7,035); Houston, TX
November 7, 2026*; 3:30 p.m., ESPN+		LIU	W 88–80	1–1	19 – Finkley	8 – Beatty	7 – Dockery	John Glaser Arena (2,212); Philadelphia, PA
November 10, 2026*; 7:00 p.m., TruTV		at Villanova; Big 5 Classic	L 59–80	1–2	19 – Suigo	12 – Suigo	6 – Crawford	Finneran Pavilion (6,501); Villanova, PA
November 15, 2026*; 2:00 p.m., ESPN+		Temple; Big 5 Classic	L 71–84	1–3	14 – Dockery	14 – Finkley	4 – Johnson	John Glaser Arena (2,056); Philadelphia, PA
November 18, 2026*; 7:00 p.m., ESPN+		Coppin State	W 88–61	2–3	36 – Burton	7 – Dockery	6 – Finkley	John Glaser Arena (1,311); Philadelphia, PA
November 21, 2026*; 4:00 p.m., ESPN+		Penn	L 73–83	2–4	13 – Collier	8 – Burton	6 – Johnson	John Glaser Arena (1,472); Philadelphia, PA
November 23, 2026*; 7:00 p.m., ESPN+		Penn State Brandywine (D-III)						John Glaser Arena; Philadelphia, PA
November 27, 2026*; 3:30 p.m.		vs. Bucknell; Cathedral Classic						Palestra; Philadelphia, PA
December 1, 2026*; 7:00 p.m.		Wofford						John Glaser Arena; Philadelphia, PA
December 5, 2026*; TBA		vs. TBD; Big 5 Classic- 5th place game						Xfinity Mobile Arena; Philadelphia, PA
December 8, 2026*; 7:00 p.m.		at Monmouth						OceanFirst Bank Center; West Long Branch, NJ
December 12, 2026*; 2:00 p.m.		at Stony Brook						Stony Brook Arena; Stony Brook, NY
December 18, 2026*; 7:00 p.m.		Delaware Valley (D-III)						John Glaser Arena; Philadelphia, PA
December 22, 2026*; 9:00 p.m., ESPN+		at BYU						Marriott Center; Provo, UT
Atlantic 10 regular season
December 30, 2026; 7:00 p.m., Spectrum News 1		at Dayton						UD Arena; Dayton, OH
January 2, 2027; 4:00 p.m.		Fordham						John Glaser Arena; Philadelphia, PA
January 6, 2027; 7:00 p.m.		George Washington						John Glaser Arena; Philadelphia, PA
January 9, 2027; 1:00 p.m.		at Rhode Island						Ryan Center; Kingston, RI
January 13, 2027; 6:00 p.m.		at VCU						Siegel Center; Richmond, VA
January 20, 2027; 7:00 p.m., ESPN+		Saint Louis						John Glaser Arena; Philadelphia, PA
January 23, 2027; 2:00 p.m.		Davidson						John Glaser Arena; Philadelphia, PA
January 27, 2027; 7:00 p.m.		at Fordham						Rose Hill Gymnasium; Bronx, NY
January 30, 2027; 2:00 p.m.		Rhode Island						John Glaser Arena; Philadelphia, PA
February 6, 2027; 12:30 p.m., USA		at Saint Joseph's						Hagan Arena; Philadelphia, PA
February 10, 2027; 7:00 p.m.		Duquesne						John Glaser Arena; Philadelphia, PA
February 13, 2027; 6:00 p.m.		at George Washington						Charles E. Smith Center; Washington, D.C.
February 17, 2027; 7:00 p.m.		at George Mason						EagleBank Arena; Fairfax, VA
February 20, 2027; 2:00 p.m.		Loyola Chicago						John Glaser Arena; Philadelphia, PA
February 24, 2027; 8:00 p.m., ESPN+		at Saint Louis						Chaifetz Arena; St. Louis, MO
February 27, 2027; 4:30 p.m.		Richmond						John Glaser Arena; Philadelphia, PA
March 3, 2027; 7:00 p.m.		at St. Bonaventure						Reilly Center; St. Bonaventure, NY
March 6, 2027; 4:00 p.m., ESPN+		Saint Joseph's						John Glaser Arena; Philadelphia, PA
A-10 tournament
March 10–14, 2027; TBA		vs. TBD						Barclays Center; Brooklyn, NY
*Non-conference game. ^{#}Rankings from AP poll. (#) Tournament seedings in parentheses. All times are in Eastern Time.

== Rankings ==
Ranking movements
	Week																				
Poll	Pre	1	2	3	4	5	6	7	8	9	10	11	12	13	14	15	16	17	18	19	Final
AP																					
Coaches																					
