= 2026–27 Fordham Rams men's basketball team =

American college basketball season

2026–27 Fordham Rams men's basketball
- Conference: Atlantic 10 Conference
- Record: 3–1 (0–0 A–10)
- Head coach: Mike Magpayo (2nd season)
- Associate head coach: Troy Hammel
- Assistant coaches: Kevin Smith; Derrick Phelps; Ryan Hyland; Matt Hurwitz
- Home arena: Rose Hill Gymnasium

2026–27 Atlantic 10 men's basketball standings
	Conf.				Overall
Team	W		L	PCT	W		L	PCT
Duquesne	0	–	0	–	5	–	0	1.000
George Washington	0	–	0	–	5	–	1	.833
Rhode Island	0	–	0	–	5	–	1	.833
Saint Joseph's	0	–	0	–	5	–	1	.833
Fordham	0	–	0	–	4	–	1	.800
George Mason	0	–	0	–	4	–	1	.800
St. Bonaventure	0	–	0	–	4	–	1	.800
VCU	0	–	0	–	3	–	1	.750
Davidson	0	–	0	–	3	–	2	.600
Loyola Chicago	0	–	0	–	3	–	2	.600
Saint Louis	0	–	0	–	3	–	2	.600
Dayton	0	–	0	–	3	–	3	.500
Richmond	0	–	0	–	3	–	3	.500
La Salle	0	–	0	–	2	–	3	.400
† 2027 A-10 tournament winner As of November 22, 2026; Rankings from AP poll

The 2026–27 Fordham Rams men's basketball team represents Fordham University during the 2026–27 NCAA Division I men's basketball season. The Rams, led by second-year head coach Mike Magpayo, play their home games at Rose Hill Gymnasium in The Bronx, New York, as a member of the Atlantic 10 Conference.

== Previous season ==
The Rams finished the 2025–26 season 17–15, 8–10 in A-10 play. As the No. 8 seed in the A-10 tournament, they rallied from a 24-point first-half deficit but lost to No. 9 seed George Washington 66–62 in the second round.

== Offseason ==
=== Departures ===
Fordham departures
Name	Number	Pos.	Height	Weight	Year	Hometown	Reason for Departure
Zarique Nutter	1	F	6'7"	210	Graduate Student	Newark, New Jersey	Graduated
Dejour Reaves	2	G	6'0"	175	Graduate Student	Syracuse, New York	Graduated
Marcus Greene	4	G	6'2"	195	Graduate Student	Gilroy, California	Graduated
Ryan Pettis	8	G	6'4"	185	Sophomore	East Palo Alto, California	Left the team
Kingston Price	10	G	6'2"	180	Sophomore	Bowie, Maryland	Left the team
Jameson O'Toole	17	G	6'3"	200	Junior	Pittsburgh, Pennsylvania	Walk-on; left the team
Christian Henry	30	G	6'3"	195	Senior	Chicago, Illinois	Graduated
Louis Lesmond	77	G	6'6"	195	Graduate Student	Paris, France	Graduated

=== Incoming transfers ===
Fordham incoming transfers
Name	Number	Pos.	Height	Weight	Year	Hometown	Previous School
Amir Lindsey	2	G	5'11"	165	Junior	Framingham, Massachusetts	UAlbany
Lateef Patrick Jr.	5	G	6'2"	205	Graduate Student	Milton, Massachusetts	Stephen F. Austin
JJ Laboy	8	G	6'3"	191	(redshirt) Freshman	Houston, Texas	Miami
Kelvin Odih	15	G	6'4"	215	Sophomore	Providence, Rhode Island	St. John's

=== 2026 recruiting class ===
Fordham 2026 recruiting class
Name	Number	Pos.	Height	Weight	Hometown	High school
Hassan Koureissi	1	G	6'3"	170	Harlem, New York	Archbishop Stepinac
Desmond Bellot Jr.	4	G	6'3"	180	Boston, Massachusetts	CATS Academy
Frank Siaca Bey	24	F	6'9"	215	Herndon, Virginia	Fairfax Christian School
Omar Essam	35	C	6'11"	210	Cairo, Egypt	Long Island Lutheran

== Preseason ==
On October 19, 2026, the Atlantic 10 Conference released its preseason poll. Fordham was picked to finish seventh in the conference, and Rikus Schulte was named to the preseason All-A-10 second team and the All-Defensive team.

=== Preseason rankings ===
Atlantic 10 Preseason Poll
Place	Team	Votes
1	VCU	308 (11)
2	Saint Louis	307 (10)
3	Dayton	279 (2)
4	George Mason	240
5	George Washington	207
6	Saint Joseph's	181
7	Fordham	169
8	Davidson	144
9	Richmond	138
10	Duquesne	130
11	Loyola Chicago	116
12	Rhode Island	104
13	La Salle	59
14	St. Bonaventure	33
(#) first-place votes

=== Preseason All-Atlantic 10 Teams ===
Preseason All-Atlantic 10 Teams
Team	Player	Year	Position
Second	Rikus Schulte	Senior	Forward
All-Defensive	Rikus Schulte	Senior	Forward

== Roster ==
2026–27 Fordham Rams men's basketball team
Players
Coaches

Pos.	#	Name	Height	Weight	Year	Previous school	Hometown
F	0	Abass Bodija	6 ft 10 in (2.08 m)	225 lb (102 kg)	RS So	UC Riverside	Brisbane, Australia
G	1	Hassan Koureissi	6 ft 3 in (1.91 m)	170 lb (77 kg)	Fr	Archbishop Stepinac	Harlem, New York
G	2	Amir Lindsey	5 ft 11 in (1.8 m)	165 lb (75 kg)	Jr	UAlbany	Framingham, Massachusetts
C	3	Jack Whitbourn	6 ft 11 in (2.11 m)	250 lb (113 kg)	Jr	UC Riverside	Melbourne, Australia
G	4	Desmond Bellot Jr.	6 ft 3 in (1.91 m)	180 lb (82 kg)	Fr	CATS Academy	Boston, Massachusetts
G	5	Lateef Patrick Jr.	6 ft 2 in (1.88 m)	205 lb (93 kg)	GS	Stephen F. Austin	Milton, Massachusetts
G	8	JJ Laboy	6 ft 3 in (1.91 m)	191 lb (87 kg)	RS Fr	Miami	Houston, Texas
F	12	Rikus Schulte	6 ft 9 in (2.06 m)	240 lb (109 kg)	Sr	UC Riverside	Münster, Germany
F	13	Akira Jacobs	6 ft 10 in (2.08 m)	230 lb (104 kg)	Sr	Hawaii	Yokohama, Japan
F	14	Roor Akhuar	6 ft 7 in (2.01 m)	205 lb (93 kg)	So	Center of Excellence	Melbourne, Australia
G	15	Kelvin Odih	6 ft 4 in (1.93 m)	215 lb (98 kg)	So	St. John's	Providence, Rhode Island
G	21	Aidan Crotty (W)	5 ft 11 in (1.8 m)	165 lb (75 kg)	Jr	Fairfield Prep	Fairfield, Connecticut
G	23	Max Miller (W)	6 ft 0 in (1.83 m)	165 lb (75 kg)	Jr	Worcester Academy	Rye, New York
F	24	Frank Siaca Bey	6 ft 9 in (2.06 m)	215 lb (98 kg)	Fr	Fairfax Christian School	Herndon, Virginia
C	35	Omar Essam	6 ft 11 in (2.11 m)	210 lb (95 kg)	Fr	Long Island Lutheran	Cairo, Egypt

Head coach

- Mike Magpayo (UC Santa Barbara)

Assistant coach(es)

- Troy Hammel (Merrimack)
- Kevin Smith (Richmond)
- Derrick Phelps (North Carolina)
- Ryan Hyland (Catholic)
- Matt Hurwitz (UCLA)

Legend

- (C) Team captain
- (S) Suspended
- (I) Ineligible
- (W) Walk-on
- Injured
- Current redshirt

Roster
Last update: November 8, 2026

== Schedule and results ==
Date time, TV	Rank^{#}	Opponent^{#}	Result	Record	High points	High rebounds	High assists	Site (attendance) city, state
Exhibition
October 21, 2026*; 6:00 p.m.		UMBC	W 87–67	–	16 – Bodija	6 – Tied	3 – Tied	Rose Hill Gymnasium (348); Bronx, NY
October 24, 2026*; 7:00 p.m.		at Fairfield	W 79–62	–	20 – Patrick Jr.	15 – Whitbourn	3 – Tied	Leo D. Mahoney Arena (2,353); Fairfield, CT
Non-conference regular season
November 2, 2026*; 8:00 p.m., ESPN+		at No. 17 Kansas	L 65–95	0–1	20 – Jacobs	6 – Tied	7 – Lindsey	Allen Fieldhouse (15,300); Lawrence, KS
November 5, 2026*; 7:30 p.m.		Stonehill	W 83–63	1–1	22 – Patrick Jr.	10 – Schulte	6 – Lindsey	Rose Hill Gymnasium (1,263); Bronx, NY
November 10, 2026*; 7:00 p.m., ESPN+		Iona	W 78–72	2–1	20 – Lindsey	7 – Schulte	8 – Lindsey	Rose Hill Gymnasium (1,209); Bronx, NY
November 13, 2026*; 7:00 p.m., ESPN+		LIU	W 80–58	3–1	23 – Bodija	10 – Bodija	7 – Lindsey	Rose Hill Gymnasium (1,098); Bronx, NY
November 17, 2026*; 7:00 p.m., ESPN+		at Manhattan; Battle of the Bronx	W 80–61	4–1	18 – Koureissi	11 – Whitbourn	6 – Koureissi	Draddy Gymnasium (1,412); Riverdale, NY
November 21, 2026*; 2:00 p.m.		vs. Portland; Acrisure Series Pod 5	W 87–69	5–1	19 – Patrick Jr.	13 – Bodija	4 – Lindsey	Acrisure Arena; Thousand Palms, CA
November 22, 2026*; 2:00 p.m.		vs. San Diego; Acrisure Series Pod 5						Acrisure Arena; Thousand Palms, CA
November 25, 2026*; 11:00 a.m., ESPN+		Mercy (D-II)						Rose Hill Gymnasium; Bronx, NY
November 28, 2026*; 2:00 p.m., ESPN+		at Harvard						Lavietes Pavilion; Boston, MA
December 1, 2026*; 7:00 p.m., ESPN+		Boston University						Rose Hill Gymnasium; Bronx, NY
December 3, 2026*; 7:00 p.m., ESPN+		St. Francis (IL) (NAIA)						Rose Hill Gymnasium; Bronx, NY
December 7, 2026*; 7:00 p.m., ESPN+		Fairleigh Dickinson						Rose Hill Gymnasium; Bronx, NY
December 10, 2026*; 7:00 p.m., ESPN+		Bryant						Rose Hill Gymnasium; Bronx, NY
December 20, 2026*; 2:00 p.m., ESPN+		Central Connecticut						Rose Hill Gymnasium; Bronx, NY
Atlantic 10 regular season
December 30, 2026; 7:00 p.m., ESPN+		Saint Louis						Rose Hill Gymnasium; Bronx, NY
January 2, 2027; 4:00 p.m.		at La Salle						John Glaser Arena; Philadelphia, PA
January 6, 2027; 7:00 p.m.		at George Mason						EagleBank Arena; Fairfax, VA
January 9, 2027; 2:00 p.m.		St. Bonaventure						Rose Hill Gymnasium; Bronx, NY
January 13, 2027; 7:00 p.m., ESPN+		Saint Joseph's						Rose Hill Gymnasium; Bronx, NY
January 16, 2027; 7:30 p.m.		at Duquesne						UPMC Cooper Fieldhouse; Pittsburgh, PA
January 20, 2027; 7:00 p.m.		at Davidson						John M. Belk Arena; Davidson, NC
January 27, 2027; 7:00 p.m.		La Salle						Rose Hill Gymnasium; Bronx, NY
January 30, 2027; 2:30 p.m.		George Washington						Rose Hill Gymnasium; Bronx, NY
February 3, 2027; 7:00 p.m.		at Rhode Island						Ryan Center; Kingston, RI
February 6, 2027; 4:30 p.m., CBSSN		Dayton						Rose Hill Gymnasium; Bronx, NY
February 9, 2027; 7:00 p.m., ESPN+		at Saint Joseph's						Hagan Arena; Philadelphia, PA
February 13, 2027; 4:00 p.m.		at St. Bonaventure						Reilly Center; St. Bonaventure, NY
February 16, 2027; 7:00 p.m.		VCU						Rose Hill Gymnasium; Bronx, NY
February 20, 2027; 2:00 p.m.		Rhode Island						Rose Hill Gymnasium; Bronx, NY
February 27, 2027; 4:00 p.m.		at Loyola Chicago						Joseph J. Gentile Arena; Chicago, IL
March 3, 2027; 7:00 p.m.		Davidson						Rose Hill Gymnasium; Bronx, NY
March 6, 2027; 6:00 p.m.		at Richmond						Robins Center; Richmond, VA
A-10 tournament
March 10–14, 2027; TBA		vs. TBD						Barclays Center; Brooklyn, NY
*Non-conference game. ^{#}Rankings from AP poll. (#) Tournament seedings in parentheses. All times are in Eastern Time.

== Rankings ==
Ranking movements
	Week																				
Poll	Pre	1	2	3	4	5	6	7	8	9	10	11	12	13	14	15	16	17	18	19	Final
AP																					
Coaches																					
