= 2026–27 St. Bonaventure Bonnies men's basketball team =

American college basketball season

2026–27 St. Bonaventure Bonnies men's basketball
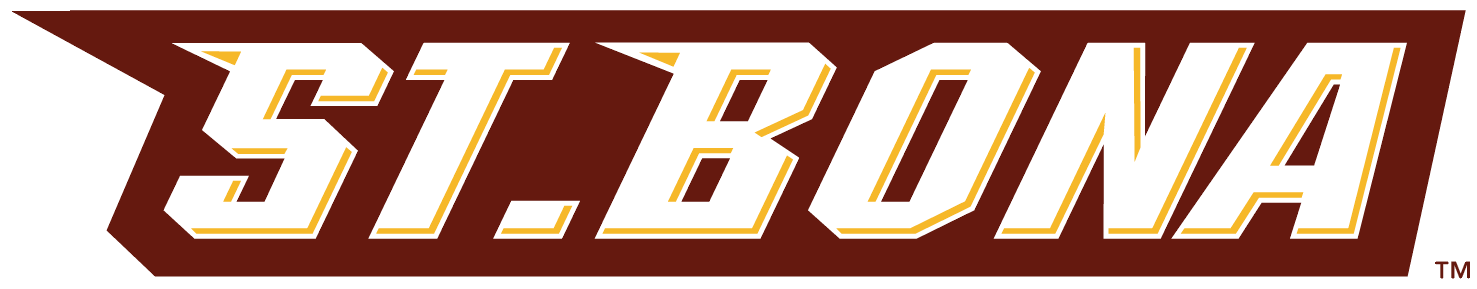
- Conference: Atlantic 10 Conference
- Record: 3–1 (0–0 A–10)
- Head coach: Mike MacDonald (1st season)
- Assistant coaches: Akbar Waheed; Clive Bentick; Nick Fruscio
- Home arena: Reilly Center

2026–27 Atlantic 10 men's basketball standings
	Conf.				Overall
Team	W		L	PCT	W		L	PCT
Rhode Island	0	–	0	–	5	–	0	1.000
Duquesne	0	–	0	–	4	–	0	1.000
George Washington	0	–	0	–	4	–	0	1.000
Saint Joseph's	0	–	0	–	4	–	0	1.000
Davidson	0	–	0	–	3	–	1	.750
George Mason	0	–	0	–	3	–	1	.750
Fordham	0	–	0	–	3	–	1	.750
Loyola Chicago	0	–	0	–	3	–	1	.750
Richmond	0	–	0	–	3	–	1	.750
St. Bonaventure	0	–	0	–	3	–	1	.750
Saint Louis	0	–	0	–	3	–	1	.750
VCU	0	–	0	–	2	–	1	.667
La Salle	0	–	0	–	1	–	3	.250
Dayton	0	–	0	–	1	–	3	.250
† 2027 A-10 tournament winner As of November 17, 2026; Rankings from AP poll

The 2026–27 St. Bonaventure Bonnies men's basketball team represents St. Bonaventure University during the 2026–27 NCAA Division I men's basketball season. The Bonnies, led by first-year head coach Mike MacDonald, play their home games at the Reilly Center in St. Bonaventure, New York, as a member of the Atlantic 10 Conference.

== Previous season ==
The Bonnies finished the 2025–26 season 17–17, 4–14 in A-10 play. As the No. 13 seed in the A-10 tournament, they defeated La Salle and No. 5 seed George Mason before losing to No. 4 seed Dayton 68–63 in the quarterfinals, which was the final game of head coach Mark Schmidt's 19-year tenure.

== Offseason ==
=== Coaching change ===
Schmidt retired at the end of the 2025–26 season. On March 31, 2026, St. Bonaventure hired Mike MacDonald, a 1988 alumnus who had gone 265–86 in 12 seasons at Division II Daemen, including a Division II Elite Eight appearance in 2025–26, as the program's 20th head coach. MacDonald had previously been head coach at Canisius from 1997 to 2006. Three Daemen players, Zach Philipkoski, Benjamin Bill and Ryan Heath, followed MacDonald to St. Bonaventure.

=== Departures ===
St. Bonaventure departures
Name	Number	Pos.	Height	Weight	Year	Hometown	Reason for Departure
Frank Mitchell	00	F	6'8"	270	Senior	Toronto, Ontario	Entered transfer portal
Amar'e Marshall	2	G	6'4"	210	(redshirt) Senior	Montclair, New Jersey	Graduated
Daniel Egbuniwe	3	F	6'7"	210	Senior	Memphis, Tennessee	Entered transfer portal
Dasonte Bowen	5	G	6'2"	190	(redshirt) Junior	Boston, Massachusetts	Entered transfer portal
Brayden Jackson	7	G	6'8"	200	Sophomore	Milton, Ontario	Left the team
Darryl Simmons II	8	G	5'11"	175	Junior	Detroit, Michigan	Transferred to Villanova
Xander Wedlow	21	F/C	6'10"	245	Sophomore	Detroit, Michigan	Left the team
Cayden Charles	24	G	6'3"	185	Senior	Kennesaw, Georgia	Graduated
Broek Ostrom	30	G	6'2"	180	Senior	Holley, New York	Graduated
Andrew Osasuyi	33	C	6'9"		Freshman	Magenta, Italy	Transferred to Georgia

=== Incoming transfers ===
St. Bonaventure incoming transfers
Name	Number	Pos.	Height	Weight	Year	Hometown	Previous School
Mason Blackwood	2	F	6'7"	230	Sophomore	Rochester, New York	Penn State
Akbar Waheed III	3	G	6'6"	205	(redshirt) Freshman	North Bethesda, Maryland	Boston College
Ryan Heath	5	G	5'11"	155	Senior	Rochester, New York	Daemen
Taj Au-Duke	8	G	6'3"	190	Junior	Toronto, Ontario	Indian Hills CC
Ari Fulton	11	G	6'7"	205	Junior	Fayetteville, North Carolina	NJIT
Zach Philipkoski	18	G	6'4"	200	Senior	New Hartford, New York	Daemen
Benjamin Bill	24	C	6'10"	240	(redshirt) Senior	Hamburg, New York	Daemen
Ryan Kalambay	30	F	6'9"	240	Junior	Brampton, Ontario	Detroit Mercy

=== 2026 recruiting class ===
St. Bonaventure 2026 recruiting class
Name	Number	Pos.	Height	Weight	Hometown	High school
Cameron Blankenberg	4	F	6'8"	200	Ontario Center, New York	Winchendon School
Leo Kirk	10	G	6'0"	170	Weston, Massachusetts	Weston High School
Chiek Diallo	17	C	6'9"	240	Vitoria-Gasteiz, Spain	Baskonia

== Preseason ==
On October 19, 2026, the Atlantic 10 Conference released its preseason poll. St. Bonaventure was picked to finish last in the 14-team conference. No Bonnies were named to the preseason all-conference teams.

=== Preseason rankings ===
Atlantic 10 Preseason Poll
Place	Team	Votes
1	VCU	308 (11)
2	Saint Louis	307 (10)
3	Dayton	279 (2)
4	George Mason	240
5	George Washington	207
6	Saint Joseph's	181
7	Fordham	169
8	Davidson	144
9	Richmond	138
10	Duquesne	130
11	Loyola Chicago	116
12	Rhode Island	104
13	La Salle	59
14	St. Bonaventure	33
(#) first-place votes

== Roster ==
2026–27 St. Bonaventure Bonnies men's basketball team
Players
Coaches

Pos.	#	Name	Height	Weight	Year	Previous school	Hometown
G	1	Ilia Ermakov	6 ft 6 in (1.98 m)	—	So	CSKA Moscow II	Kursk, Russia
F	2	Mason Blackwood	6 ft 7 in (2.01 m)	230 lb (104 kg)	So	Penn State	Rochester, New York
G	3	Akbar Waheed III	6 ft 6 in (1.98 m)	205 lb (93 kg)	RS Fr	Boston College	North Bethesda, Maryland
F	4	Cameron Blankenberg	6 ft 8 in (2.03 m)	200 lb (91 kg)	Fr	Winchendon School	Ontario Center, New York
G	5	Ryan Heath	5 ft 11 in (1.8 m)	155 lb (70 kg)	Sr	Daemen	Rochester, New York
G	8	Taj Au-Duke	6 ft 3 in (1.91 m)	190 lb (86 kg)	Jr	Indian Hills CC	Toronto, Ontario
G	10	Leo Kirk	6 ft 0 in (1.83 m)	170 lb (77 kg)	Fr	Weston High School	Weston, Massachusetts
G	11	Ari Fulton	6 ft 7 in (2.01 m)	205 lb (93 kg)	Jr	NJIT	Fayetteville, North Carolina
F	12	John Ikpotokin	6 ft 7 in (2.01 m)	210 lb (95 kg)	RS Fr	Rothesay Netherwood School	Dublin, Ireland
G	15	Jack DeRose (W)	6 ft 0 in (1.83 m)	175 lb (79 kg)	Sr	Olean High School	Olean, New York
C	17	Chiek Diallo	6 ft 9 in (2.06 m)	240 lb (109 kg)	Fr	Baskonia	Vitoria-Gasteiz, Spain
G	18	Zach Philipkoski	6 ft 4 in (1.93 m)	200 lb (91 kg)	Sr	Daemen	New Hartford, New York
G	20	Achille Lonati	6 ft 5 in (1.96 m)	200 lb (91 kg)	So	Olimpia Milano	Pavia, Italy
C	24	Benjamin Bill	6 ft 10 in (2.08 m)	240 lb (109 kg)	RS Sr	Daemen	Hamburg, New York
F	30	Ryan Kalambay	6 ft 9 in (2.06 m)	240 lb (109 kg)	Jr	Detroit Mercy	Brampton, Ontario
F	32	Joe Grahovac	6 ft 10 in (2.08 m)	215 lb (98 kg)	Jr	Fullerton College	Santa Ana, California

Head coach

- Mike MacDonald (St. Bonaventure)

Assistant coach(es)

- Akbar Waheed
- Clive Bentick
- Nick Fruscio

Legend

- (C) Team captain
- (S) Suspended
- (I) Ineligible
- (W) Walk-on
- Injured
- Current redshirt

Roster
Last update: November 8, 2026

== Schedule and results ==
Date time, TV	Rank^{#}	Opponent^{#}	Result	Record	High points	High rebounds	High assists	Site (attendance) city, state
Exhibition
October 17, 2026*; 4:00 p.m.		vs. Penn State; Greenlight Preseason Showcase	L 65–68	–	15 – Blackwood	7 – Bill	4 – Au-Duke	KeyBank Center (3,500); Buffalo, NY
October 24, 2026*; 4:00 p.m.		Point Park (NAIA)	W 94–49	–	17 – Au-Duke	7 – Bill	5 – Lonati	Reilly Center (795); St. Bonaventure, NY
Non-conference regular season
November 2, 2026*; 7:00 p.m., ESPN+		Youngstown State	L 71–79	0–1	28 – Philipkoski	9 – Bill	4 – Tied	Reilly Center (3,350); St. Bonaventure, NY
November 7, 2026*; 7:00 p.m., ESPN+		at Canisius	W 88–49	1–1	18 – Fulton	8 – Fulton	5 – Ermakov	Koessler Athletic Center (1,478); Buffalo, NY
November 11, 2026*; 7:00 p.m., ESPN+		Cornell	W 88–64	2–1	28 – Bill	8 – Tied	5 – Au-Duke	Reilly Center (3,608); St. Bonaventure, NY
November 14, 2026*; 4:00 p.m., ESPN+		Lafayette	W 81–58	3–1	20 – Fulton	9 – Tied	6 – Philipkoski	Reilly Center (3,412); St. Bonaventure, NY
November 19, 2026*; 7:00 p.m., ESPN+/YES		Buffalo						Reilly Center; St. Bonaventure, NY
November 23, 2026*; 11:00 a.m., ESPN2		vs. Appalachian State; ESPN Events Invitational						State Farm Field House; Kissimmee, FL
November 24, 2026*; 10:00 a.m., ESPN2		vs. Wright State; ESPN Events Invitational						State Farm Field House; Kissimmee, FL
November 25, 2026*; 10:00 a.m., ESPN2		vs. Belmont; ESPN Events Invitational						State Farm Field House; Kissimmee, FL
December 5, 2026*; 12:30 p.m., USA		Florida Atlantic						Reilly Center; St. Bonaventure, NY
December 9, 2026*; 7:00 p.m.		at Siena; Franciscan Cup						MVP Arena; Albany, NY
December 12, 2026*; 2:00 p.m.		vs. Temple						Palestra; Philadelphia, PA
December 16, 2026*; 7:00 p.m., ESPN+		UAlbany						Reilly Center; St. Bonaventure, NY
December 19, 2026*; 12:00 p.m., ESPN+/YES		Mercyhurst						Reilly Center; St. Bonaventure, NY
December 28, 2026*; 2:00 p.m., ESPN+		Roberts Wesleyan (D-II)						Reilly Center; St. Bonaventure, NY
Atlantic 10 regular season
December 30, 2026; 8:00 p.m., CBSSN		VCU						Reilly Center; St. Bonaventure, NY
January 2, 2027; 4:00 p.m., CBSSN		at Saint Louis						Chaifetz Arena; St. Louis, MO
January 6, 2027; 7:00 p.m., ESPN+		Saint Joseph's						Reilly Center; St. Bonaventure, NY
January 9, 2027; 2:00 p.m., ESPN+		at Fordham						Rose Hill Gymnasium; Bronx, NY
January 13, 2027; 7:00 p.m., ESPN+		at George Mason						EagleBank Arena; Fairfax, VA
January 16, 2027; 4:00 p.m., CBSSN		Dayton						Reilly Center; St. Bonaventure, NY
January 23, 2027; 12:30 p.m., USA		George Washington						Reilly Center; St. Bonaventure, NY
January 27, 2027; 8:00 p.m.		at Loyola Chicago						Joseph J. Gentile Arena; Chicago, IL
January 30, 2027; 2:00 p.m.		at Duquesne						UPMC Cooper Fieldhouse; Pittsburgh, PA
February 3, 2027; 7:00 p.m., ESPN+/YES		George Mason						Reilly Center; St. Bonaventure, NY
February 6, 2027; 2:30 p.m., USA		Richmond						Reilly Center; St. Bonaventure, NY
February 10, 2027; 7:00 p.m.		at Davidson						John M. Belk Arena; Davidson, NC
February 13, 2027; 4:00 p.m., ESPN+/YES		Fordham						Reilly Center; St. Bonaventure, NY
February 20, 2027; 2:30 p.m., USA		at Richmond						Robins Center; Richmond, VA
February 23, 2027; 6:30 p.m., CBSSN		at VCU						Siegel Center; Richmond, VA
February 27, 2027; 2:00 p.m., ESPN+/YES		Duquesne						Reilly Center; St. Bonaventure, NY
March 3, 2027; 7:00 p.m., ESPN+		La Salle						Reilly Center; St. Bonaventure, NY
March 6, 2027; 1:00 p.m., ESPN+		at Rhode Island						Ryan Center; Kingston, RI
A-10 tournament
March 10–14, 2027; TBA		vs. TBD						Barclays Center; Brooklyn, NY
*Non-conference game. ^{#}Rankings from AP poll. (#) Tournament seedings in parentheses. All times are in Eastern Time.

== Rankings ==
Ranking movements
	Week																				
Poll	Pre	1	2	3	4	5	6	7	8	9	10	11	12	13	14	15	16	17	18	19	Final
AP																					
Coaches																					
