= 2026–27 George Mason Patriots men's basketball team =

American college basketball season

2026–27 George Mason Patriots men's basketball
- Conference: Atlantic 10 Conference
- Record: 3–1 (0–0 A–10)
- Head coach: Tony Skinn (4th season)
- Assistant coaches: Steve Curran; Louis Hinnant; Andy Fox; Jesse Pruitt
- Home arena: EagleBank Arena

2026–27 Atlantic 10 men's basketball standings
	Conf.				Overall
Team	W		L	PCT	W		L	PCT
Duquesne	0	–	0	–	5	–	0	1.000
George Washington	0	–	0	–	5	–	1	.833
Rhode Island	0	–	0	–	5	–	1	.833
Saint Joseph's	0	–	0	–	5	–	1	.833
Fordham	0	–	0	–	4	–	1	.800
George Mason	0	–	0	–	4	–	1	.800
St. Bonaventure	0	–	0	–	4	–	1	.800
VCU	0	–	0	–	3	–	1	.750
Davidson	0	–	0	–	3	–	2	.600
Loyola Chicago	0	–	0	–	3	–	2	.600
Saint Louis	0	–	0	–	3	–	2	.600
Dayton	0	–	0	–	3	–	3	.500
Richmond	0	–	0	–	3	–	3	.500
La Salle	0	–	0	–	2	–	3	.400
† 2027 A-10 tournament winner As of November 22, 2026; Rankings from AP poll

The 2026–27 George Mason Patriots men's basketball team represents George Mason University during the 2026–27 NCAA Division I men's basketball season. The Patriots, led by fourth-year head coach Tony Skinn, play their home games at EagleBank Arena in Fairfax, Virginia, as a member of the Atlantic 10 Conference.

== Previous season ==
The Patriots finished the 2025–26 season 23–10, 11–7 in A-10 play, after an 18–1 start. As the No. 5 seed in the A-10 tournament, they lost to No. 13 seed St. Bonaventure 63–57 in the second round. The Patriots received a bid to the NIT, where they lost to Liberty 77–71 at home in the first round.

== Offseason ==
=== Coaching staff ===
On June 11, 2026, George Mason signed Skinn to a two-year contract extension through the 2031–32 season. Skinn, the 2025 A-10 Coach of the Year, became the first coach in program history to lead the Patriots to three straight 20-win seasons.

=== Departures ===
George Mason departures
Name	Number	Pos.	Height	Weight	Year	Hometown	Reason for Departure
Masai Troutman	0	G	6'5"	200	Senior	Frederick, Maryland	Graduated
Jahari Long	2	G	6'5"	210	Graduate Student	Houston, Texas	Transferred to Witchita State
Kory Mincy	3	G	6'2"	180	Junior	East Point, Georgia	Transferred to South Carolina
Dola Adebayo	4	F	6'8"	220	Graduate Student	Fort Myers, Florida	Graduated
Fatt Hill	5	G	6'5"	185	Senior	Bessemer, Alabama	Graduated
Isaiah Skinn	7	G	6'0"	165	Freshman	Alexandria, Virginia	Transferred to Colgate
Stas Sivka	9	F	6'10"	220	Sophomore	Celje, Slovenia	Transferred to William & Mary
Devin Booker	11	G	6'4"	180	Freshman	Philadelphia, Pennsylvania	Transferred to La Salle
Nick Ellington	23	F	6'8"	215	Graduate Student	St. Louis, Missouri	Graduated
Riley Allenspach	35	F/C	6'11"	250	Junior	Charlotte, North Carolina	Transferred to Cincinnati

=== Incoming transfers ===
George Mason incoming transfers
Name	Number	Pos.	Height	Weight	Year	Hometown	Previous School
Makhai Valentine	0	G	6'3"	190	Junior	Munhall, Pennsylvania	Northern Illinois
Efeosa Oliogu-Elabor	4	G/F	6'6"	220	Sophomore	Markham, Ontario	Butler
Baraka Okojie	6	G	6'3"	195	Senior	Brampton, Ontario	Mercer
Emmett Adair	18	F	6'9"	230	Sophomore	Sydney, Australia	Loyola (MD)
Elijah Jones	33	F	6'8"	220	Senior	Pleasantville, New Jersey	UTEP
Michael Marcus Jr.	44	F	6'9"	255	Junior	Indian Trail, North Carolina	Appalachian State
Lilian Marville	45	G	6'1"	180	Sophomore	Orléans, France	UNC Greensboro
James Nnaji	46	C	7'0"	265	Sophomore	Makurdi, Nigeria	Baylor

=== 2026 recruiting class ===
George Mason 2026 recruiting class
Name	Number	Pos.	Height	Hometown	High school
Peyton Miller	3	G	6'3"	Hillside, New Jersey	Overtime Elite
Shane Pendergrass	5	F	6'8"	Upper Marlboro, Maryland	Hargrave Military Academy
Bryton Barrett	11	F	6'8"	Owings Mills, Maryland	Archbishop Carroll

== Preseason ==
On October 19, 2026, the Atlantic 10 Conference released its preseason poll. George Mason was picked to finish fourth in the conference, tied for the highest the Patriots have been picked since joining the A-10 in 2013. Baraka Okojie was named to the preseason All-A-10 second team, and Brayden O'Connor, who missed all but one game of the 2025–26 season with a broken foot, was named to the third team.

=== Preseason rankings ===
Atlantic 10 Preseason Poll
Place	Team	Votes
1	VCU	308 (11)
2	Saint Louis	307 (10)
3	Dayton	279 (2)
4	George Mason	240
5	George Washington	207
6	Saint Joseph's	181
7	Fordham	169
8	Davidson	144
9	Richmond	138
10	Duquesne	130
11	Loyola Chicago	116
12	Rhode Island	104
13	La Salle	59
14	St. Bonaventure	33
(#) first-place votes

=== Preseason All-Atlantic 10 Teams ===
Preseason All-Atlantic 10 Teams
Team	Player	Year	Position
Second	Baraka Okojie	Senior	Guard
Third	Brayden O'Connor	Graduate student	Guard

== Roster ==
2026–27 George Mason Patriots men's basketball team
Players
Coaches

Pos.	#	Name	Height	Weight	Year	Previous school	Hometown
G	0	Makhai Valentine	6 ft 3 in (1.91 m)	190 lb (86 kg)	Jr	Northern Illinois	Munhall, Pennsylvania
G	1	Brayden O'Connor	6 ft 5 in (1.96 m)	207 lb (94 kg)	GS	UMass Lowell	Ottawa, Ontario
G	3	Peyton Miller	6 ft 3 in (1.91 m)	—	Fr	Overtime Elite	Hillside, New Jersey
G/F	4	Efeosa Oliogu-Elabor	6 ft 6 in (1.98 m)	220 lb (100 kg)	So	Butler	Markham, Ontario
F	5	Shane Pendergrass	6 ft 8 in (2.03 m)	—	Fr	Hargrave Military Academy	Upper Marlboro, Maryland
G	6	Baraka Okojie	6 ft 3 in (1.91 m)	195 lb (88 kg)	Sr	Mercer	Brampton, Ontario
F	10	Emmanuel Kanga	6 ft 9 in (2.06 m)	220 lb (100 kg)	So	Mt. Zion Prep	Libreville, Gabon
F	11	Bryton Barrett	6 ft 8 in (2.03 m)	—	Fr	Archbishop Carroll High School	Owings Mills, Maryland
G	12	Ben Woodward	6 ft 4 in (1.93 m)	195 lb (88 kg)	Sr	John Champe High School	Ashburn, Virginia
G/F	13	Malik Presley	6 ft 6 in (1.98 m)	200 lb (91 kg)	Sr	Texas	San Marcos, Texas
G	14	T.J. Prosise	6 ft 3 in (1.91 m)	175 lb (79 kg)	Jr	Life Christian Academy	Chesterfield, Virginia
F	18	Emmett Adair	6 ft 9 in (2.06 m)	230 lb (104 kg)	So	Loyola (MD)	Sydney, Australia
F	31	Ryan-Preston Mendy	6 ft 9 in (2.06 m)	205 lb (93 kg)	So	Joliot Curie Comprehensive School	Nanterre, France
F	33	Elijah Jones	6 ft 8 in (2.03 m)	220 lb (100 kg)	Sr	UTEP	Pleasantville, New Jersey
F	44	Michael Marcus Jr.	6 ft 9 in (2.06 m)	255 lb (116 kg)	Jr	Appalachian State	Indian Trail, North Carolina
G	45	Lilian Marville	6 ft 1 in (1.85 m)	180 lb (82 kg)	So	UNC Greensboro	Orléans, France
C	46	James Nnaji	7 ft 0 in (2.13 m)	265 lb (120 kg)	So	Baylor	Makurdi, Nigeria

Head coach

- Tony Skinn (George Mason)

Assistant coach(es)

- Steve Curran (Merrimack)
- Louis Hinnant (Boston College)
- Andy Fox (Cornell (Iowa))
- Jesse Pruitt

Legend

- (C) Team captain
- (S) Suspended
- (I) Ineligible
- (W) Walk-on
- Injured
- Current redshirt

Roster
Last update: November 8, 2026

== Schedule and results ==
Date time, TV	Rank^{#}	Opponent^{#}	Result	Record	High points	High rebounds	High assists	Site (attendance) city, state
Exhibition
October 17, 2026*; 1:00 p.m.		at Villanova	L 67–84	–	14 – O'Connor	8 – Jones	6 – Oliogu-Elabor	Finneran Pavilion (3,990); Villanova, PA
October 25, 2026*; 2:00 p.m.		St. Mary's (MD) (D-III)	W 96–41	–	14 – Kanga	9 – Kanga	7 – Okojie	EagleBank Arena (1,758); Fairfax, VA
Non-conference regular season
November 2, 2026*; 4:00 p.m., ESPN+		UMBC	W 82–54	1–0	17 – Oliogu-Elabor	10 – Kanga	5 – Okojie	EagleBank Arena (3,290); Fairfax, VA
November 6, 2026*; 7:00 p.m., ESPN+		Coppin State	W 68–51	2–0	14 – Okojie	6 – Kanga	6 – Oliogu-Elabor	EagleBank Arena (3,301); Fairfax, VA
November 12, 2026*; 3:00 p.m., YouTube		vs. Kansas City; Showdown in St. Pete	W 76–68	3–0	16 – Pendergrass	7 – Tied	6 – O'Connor	McArthur Center (202); St. Petersburg, FL
November 14, 2026*; 1:00 p.m., YouTube		vs. Bradley; Showdown in St. Pete	L 61–62	3–1	17 – Alarie	5 – Tied	2 – Tied	McArthur Center; St. Petersburg, FL
November 18, 2026*; 7:00 p.m., ESPN+		North Carolina Central	W 83–60	4–1	16 – O'Connor	13 – Kanga	9 – Okojie	EagleBank Arena (2,667); Fairfax, VA
November 21, 2026*; 4:00 p.m., ESPN+		South Florida	W 73–62	5–1	18 – Okojie	8 – Pendergrass	4 – Oliogu-Elabor	EagleBank Arena (3,604); Fairfax, VA
November 25, 2026*; 7:00 p.m., ESPN+		Longwood						EagleBank Arena; Fairfax, VA
November 28, 2026*; 2:00 p.m., ESPN+		Marist						EagleBank Arena; Fairfax, VA
December 2, 2026*; 7:00 p.m., ESPN+		at High Point						Qubein Center; High Point, NC
December 8, 2026*; 7:00 p.m., ESPN+		Morgan State						EagleBank Arena; Fairfax, VA
December 12, 2026*; 12:30 p.m.		Old Dominion						EagleBank Arena; Fairfax, VA
December 19, 2026*; 3:30 p.m.		vs. Towson; Battle in Baltimore						CFG Bank Arena; Baltimore, MD
December 22, 2026*; 7:00 p.m., ESPN+		Bryant						EagleBank Arena; Fairfax, VA
December 27, 2026*; 4:00 p.m., ESPN+		McDaniel (D-III)						EagleBank Arena; Fairfax, VA
Atlantic 10 regular season
December 30, 2026; 7:00 p.m.		Richmond						EagleBank Arena; Fairfax, VA
January 2, 2027; 4:30 p.m.		at Rhode Island						Ryan Center; Kingston, RI
January 6, 2027; 7:00 p.m.		Fordham						EagleBank Arena; Fairfax, VA
January 9, 2027; 4:30 p.m.		at Saint Joseph's						Hagan Arena; Philadelphia, PA
January 13, 2027; 7:00 p.m.		St. Bonaventure						EagleBank Arena; Fairfax, VA
January 18, 2027; 1:00 p.m.		at George Washington						Charles E. Smith Center; Washington, D.C.
January 23, 2027; 2:30 p.m.		Loyola Chicago						EagleBank Arena; Fairfax, VA
January 27, 2027; 6:00 p.m.		at VCU; Rivalry						Siegel Center; Richmond, VA
January 30, 2027; 4:30 p.m.		Saint Joseph's						EagleBank Arena; Fairfax, VA
February 3, 2027; 7:00 p.m.		at St. Bonaventure						Reilly Center; St. Bonaventure, NY
February 6, 2027; 12:00 p.m.		George Washington						EagleBank Arena; Fairfax, VA
February 13, 2027; 2:00 p.m.		at Davidson						John M. Belk Arena; Davidson, NC
February 17, 2027; 7:00 p.m.		La Salle						EagleBank Arena; Fairfax, VA
February 20, 2027; 12:30 p.m.		at Duquesne						UPMC Cooper Fieldhouse; Pittsburgh, PA
February 23, 2027; 8:30 p.m.		at Dayton						UD Arena; Dayton, OH
February 26, 2027; 7:00 p.m.		VCU; Rivalry						EagleBank Arena; Fairfax, VA
March 3, 2027; 7:00 p.m.		Rhode Island						EagleBank Arena; Fairfax, VA
March 6, 2027; 2:30 p.m., USA		at Saint Louis						Chaifetz Arena; St. Louis, MO
A-10 tournament
March 10–14, 2027; TBA		vs. TBD						Barclays Center; Brooklyn, NY
*Non-conference game. ^{#}Rankings from AP poll. (#) Tournament seedings in parentheses. All times are in Eastern Time.

== Rankings ==
Ranking movements
	Week																				
Poll	Pre	1	2	3	4	5	6	7	8	9	10	11	12	13	14	15	16	17	18	19	Final
AP																					
Coaches																					
