= 2026–27 Loyola Ramblers men's basketball team =

American college basketball season

2026–27 Loyola Ramblers men's basketball
- Conference: Atlantic 10 Conference
- Record: 3–1 (0–0 A–10)
- Head coach: Drew Valentine (6th season)
- Assistant coaches: Chris Huey; Brendyn Taylor; Will Bailey; Keith Clemons; David Metzendorf
- Home arena: Joseph J. Gentile Arena

2026–27 Atlantic 10 men's basketball standings
	Conf.				Overall
Team	W		L	PCT	W		L	PCT
Duquesne	0	–	0	–	5	–	0	1.000
George Washington	0	–	0	–	5	–	1	.833
Rhode Island	0	–	0	–	5	–	1	.833
Saint Joseph's	0	–	0	–	5	–	1	.833
Fordham	0	–	0	–	4	–	1	.800
George Mason	0	–	0	–	4	–	1	.800
St. Bonaventure	0	–	0	–	4	–	1	.800
Saint Louis	0	–	0	–	3	–	1	.750
VCU	0	–	0	–	3	–	1	.750
Davidson	0	–	0	–	3	–	2	.600
Loyola Chicago	0	–	0	–	3	–	2	.600
Dayton	0	–	0	–	3	–	3	.500
Richmond	0	–	0	–	3	–	3	.500
La Salle	0	–	0	–	2	–	3	.400
† 2027 A-10 tournament winner As of November 21, 2026; Rankings from AP poll

The 2026–27 Loyola Ramblers men's basketball team represents Loyola University Chicago during the 2026–27 NCAA Division I men's basketball season. The Ramblers, led by sixth-year head coach Drew Valentine, play their home games at the Joseph J. Gentile Arena in Chicago, Illinois, as a member of the Atlantic 10 Conference.

== Previous season ==
The Ramblers finished the 2025–26 season 9–24, 4–14 in A-10 play. As the No. 14 seed in the A-10 tournament, they defeated No. 11 seed Richmond 75–67 in the first round before losing to No. 6 seed Davidson 64–59 in overtime in the second round.

== Offseason ==
=== Coaching staff ===
Valentine brought back Will Bailey, an assistant on the 2023–24 team that shared the A-10 regular-season title, and in June 2026 hired David Metzendorf, who had served as acting head coach at Air Force for the final 14 games of the 2025–26 season.

=== Departures ===
Loyola Chicago departures
Name	Number	Pos.	Height	Weight	Year	Hometown	Reason for Departure
Deywilk Tavarez	0	G	6'2"	190	Junior	Pennsauken, New Jersey	Entered transfer portal
Justin Moore	1	G	6'3"	185	(redshirt) Junior	Philadelphia, Pennsylvania	Entered transfer portal
Joshua Ola-Joseph	2	F	6'7"	215	Senior	Brooklyn Park, Minnesota	Graduated
Kayde Dotson	4	G	6'1"	190	Sophomore	Beaumont, Texas	Entered transfer portal
Daniil Glazkov	5	G	6'6"	210	Sophomore	Krasnodar, Russia	Entered transfer portal
Dominick Harris	7	G	6'3"	190	Graduate Student	Murrieta, California	Entered transfer portal
Alexander Richardson	9	C	6'9"	240	Senior	Glasgow, Scotland	Graduated
Chuck Love III	10	G	6'7"	195	Freshman	Lincoln, Nebraska	Entered transfer portal
Caleb Reese	14	G	5'11"	160	Senior	Warren, Michigan	Graduated
Sam Yurasek	22	G	6'3"	165	Junior	Napa, California	Entered transfer portal
Miles Rubin	24	C	6'10"	220	Junior	Chicago, Illinois	Transferred to Tennessee
Kymany Houinsou	28	G	6'7"	210	Senior	Mulhouse, France	Graduated
Brayden Young	30	F	6'9"	210	(redshirt) Freshman	Houston, Texas	Transferred to Northeastern
Zachary Royster	31	F	6'7"	220	Senior	Chicago, Illinois	Graduated

=== Incoming transfers ===
Loyola Chicago incoming transfers
Name	Number	Pos.	Height	Weight	Year	Hometown	Previous School
Dayan Nessah	0	G	6'8"	220	Junior	Geneva, Switzerland	Cleveland State
Jason Schofield	1	C	6'10"	240	Senior	Poughkeepsie, New York	Marist
Guillaume Grotzinger	2	G	6'1"	180	Senior	Dessenheim, France	Champagne Basket (France)
Sterling Knox	4	G	6'6"	215	Senior	Las Vegas, Nevada	Independence CC
Dayton Williams	5	G	6'4"	190	Junior	Louisville, Kentucky	Vincennes
Chris Jeffrey	6	G	6'3"	210	Sophomore	Brooklyn, New York	Villanova
Eddie Ricks III	7	F	6'8"	215	Senior	Clarksville, Tennessee	James Madison
Elias Rapieque	9	F	6'9"	230	Senior	Berlin, Germany	Kansas State
Donald Hand Jr.	12	G	6'5"	210	Graduate Student	Virginia Beach, Virginia	Boston College
Ryan Agarwal	22	G	6'6"	205	Graduate Student	Coppell, Texas	Stanford
Jayden Dawson	24	G	6'4"	195	Graduate Student	Omaha, Nebraska	Kansas
Malick Diallo	25	C	6'9"	240	Junior	Bamako, Mali	TCU
Aidan Wing	50	F	6'5"	205	Junior	Kansas City, Kansas	Johnson County CC

Jayden Dawson, who played for Loyola from 2022 to 2025 before transferring to Kansas, returned to the Ramblers in August 2026 after being granted temporary eligibility, pending final rulings on his permanent eligibility.

=== 2026 recruiting class ===
Loyola Chicago 2026 recruiting class
Name	Number	Pos.	Height	Weight	Hometown	High school
Ryan Kreager	10	C	6'10"	205	Faribault, Minnesota	Faribault Senior High School

== Preseason ==
On October 19, 2026, the Atlantic 10 Conference released its preseason poll. Loyola Chicago was picked to finish 11th in the conference. No Ramblers were named to the preseason all-conference teams.

=== Preseason rankings ===
Atlantic 10 Preseason Poll
Place	Team	Votes
1	VCU	308 (11)
2	Saint Louis	307 (10)
3	Dayton	279 (2)
4	George Mason	240
5	George Washington	207
6	Saint Joseph's	181
7	Fordham	169
8	Davidson	144
9	Richmond	138
10	Duquesne	130
11	Loyola Chicago	116
12	Rhode Island	104
13	La Salle	59
14	St. Bonaventure	33
(#) first-place votes

== Roster ==
2026–27 Loyola Ramblers men's basketball team
Players
Coaches

Pos.	#	Name	Height	Weight	Year	Previous school	Hometown
G	0	Dayan Nessah	6 ft 8 in (2.03 m)	220 lb (100 kg)	Jr	Cleveland State	Geneva, Switzerland
C	1	Jason Schofield	6 ft 10 in (2.08 m)	240 lb (109 kg)	Sr	Marist	Poughkeepsie, New York
G	2	Guillaume Grotzinger	6 ft 1 in (1.85 m)	180 lb (82 kg)	Sr	Champagne Basket	Dessenheim, France
G	4	Sterling Knox	6 ft 6 in (1.98 m)	215 lb (98 kg)	Sr	Independence CC	Las Vegas, Nevada
G	5	Dayton Williams	6 ft 4 in (1.93 m)	190 lb (86 kg)	Jr	Vincennes	Louisville, Kentucky
G	6	Chris Jeffrey	6 ft 3 in (1.91 m)	210 lb (95 kg)	So	Villanova	Brooklyn, New York
F	7	Eddie Ricks III	6 ft 8 in (2.03 m)	215 lb (98 kg)	Sr	James Madison	Clarksville, Tennessee
G	8	Nic Anderson	6 ft 5 in (1.96 m)	190 lb (86 kg)	So	Olathe South High School	Olathe, Kansas
F	9	Elias Rapieque	6 ft 9 in (2.06 m)	230 lb (104 kg)	Sr	Kansas State	Berlin, Germany
C	10	Ryan Kreager	6 ft 10 in (2.08 m)	205 lb (93 kg)	Fr	Faribault Senior High School	Faribault, Minnesota
G	12	Donald Hand Jr.	6 ft 5 in (1.96 m)	210 lb (95 kg)	GS	Boston College	Virginia Beach, Virginia
F	13	Xavier Amos	6 ft 8 in (2.03 m)	225 lb (102 kg)	GS	Wisconsin	Chicago, Illinois
G	22	Ryan Agarwal	6 ft 6 in (1.98 m)	205 lb (93 kg)	GS	Stanford	Coppell, Texas
G	24	Jayden Dawson	6 ft 4 in (1.93 m)	195 lb (88 kg)	GS	Kansas	Omaha, Nebraska
C	25	Malick Diallo	6 ft 9 in (2.06 m)	240 lb (109 kg)	Jr	TCU	Bamako, Mali
F	50	Aidan Wing	6 ft 5 in (1.96 m)	205 lb (93 kg)	Jr	Johnson County CC	Kansas City, Kansas

Head coach

- Drew Valentine (Oakland)

Assistant coach(es)

- Chris Huey (Kansas)
- Brendyn Taylor (USC)
- Will Bailey
- Keith Clemons (Loyola Chicago)
- David Metzendorf

Legend

- (C) Team captain
- (S) Suspended
- (I) Ineligible
- (W) Walk-on
- Injured
- Current redshirt

Roster
Last update: November 8, 2026

== Schedule and results ==
Date time, TV	Rank^{#}	Opponent^{#}	Result	Record	High points	High rebounds	High assists	Site (attendance) city, state
Exhibition
October 18, 2026*; 1:00 p.m.		DePaul	L 65–72	–	20 – Grotzinger	6 – Grotzinger	5 – Grotzinger	Joseph J. Gentile Arena (2,645); Chicago, IL
October 26, 2026*; 6:00 p.m.		Calumet College (NAIA)	W 110–49	–	17 – Grotzinger	10 – Jeffrey	8 – Jeffrey	Joseph J. Gentile Arena (1,399); Chicago, IL
Non-conference regular season
November 2, 2026*; 7:00 p.m., ESPN+		The Citadel	W 77–52	1–0	19 – Nessah	12 – Schofield	11 – Grotzinger	Joseph J. Gentile Arena (1,959); Chicago, IL
November 5, 2026*; 7:00 p.m., ESPN+		West Georgia	W 76–53	2–0	15 – Nessah	7 – Tied	6 – Grotzinger	Joseph J. Gentile Arena (1,824); Chicago, IL
November 11, 2026*; 2:00 p.m.		at Air Force	L 93–107	2–1	26 – Hobin	7 – Tied	12 – Sanders	Clune Arena (955); USAFA, CO
November 14, 2026*; 12:30 p.m., USA		at Colorado State	W 73–58	3–1	11 – Agarwal	6 – Tied	4 – Rapieque	Moby Arena (4,597); Fort Collins, CO
November 18, 2026*; 7:00 p.m., ESPN+		Wichita State						Joseph J. Gentile Arena; Chicago, IL
November 22, 2026*; 11:00 p.m.		vs. San Jose State; Acrisure Series Pod 4 semifinals						Acrisure Arena; Thousand Palms, CA
November 23, 2026*; TBA		vs. Seattle or UC San Diego; Acrisure Series Pod 4						Acrisure Arena; Thousand Palms, CA
November 29, 2026*; 12:00 p.m., ESPN+		at Massachusetts						Mullins Center; Amherst, MA
December 4, 2026*; 7:00 p.m., ESPN+		Augustana (IL) (D-III)						Joseph J. Gentile Arena; Chicago, IL
December 10, 2026*; 7:00 p.m., BET		at Howard						Burr Gymnasium; Washington, D.C.
December 12, 2026*; 7:00 p.m., ESPN+		IU Indy						Joseph J. Gentile Arena; Chicago, IL
December 18, 2026*; 1:00 p.m.		vs. Florida Atlantic; Texas Legends College Classic						Comerica Center; Frisco, TX
December 20, 2026*; 7:30 p.m.		vs. Nevada; Texas Legends College Classic						Comerica Center; Frisco, TX
Atlantic 10 regular season
December 30, 2026; 7:00 p.m., ESPN+		George Washington						Joseph J. Gentile Arena; Chicago, IL
January 2, 2027; 5:00 p.m.		at Richmond						Robins Center; Richmond, VA
January 6, 2027; 6:00 p.m.		at Dayton						UD Arena; Dayton, OH
January 9, 2027; 1:00 p.m.		Duquesne						Joseph J. Gentile Arena; Chicago, IL
January 13, 2027; 6:00 p.m., CBSSN		at Saint Louis						Chaifetz Arena; St. Louis, MO
January 16, 2027; 1:30 p.m.		Davidson						Joseph J. Gentile Arena; Chicago, IL
January 23, 2027; 1:30 p.m.		at George Mason						EagleBank Arena; Fairfax, VA
January 27, 2027; 7:00 p.m.		St. Bonaventure						Joseph J. Gentile Arena; Chicago, IL
January 30, 2027; 5:00 p.m.		at Davidson						John M. Belk Arena; Davidson, NC
February 2, 2027; 8:00 p.m.		Dayton						Joseph J. Gentile Arena; Chicago, IL
February 6, 2027; 1:00 p.m.		at Duquesne						UPMC Cooper Fieldhouse; Pittsburgh, PA
February 9, 2027; 7:00 p.m., CBSSN		Saint Louis						Joseph J. Gentile Arena; Chicago, IL
February 13, 2027; 3:00 p.m.		Rhode Island						Joseph J. Gentile Arena; Chicago, IL
February 16, 2027; 6:00 p.m.		at Saint Joseph's						Hagan Arena; Philadelphia, PA
February 20, 2027; 1:00 p.m.		at La Salle						John Glaser Arena; Philadelphia, PA
February 27, 2027; 3:00 p.m.		Fordham						Joseph J. Gentile Arena; Chicago, IL
March 2, 2027; 7:00 p.m.		VCU						Joseph J. Gentile Arena; Chicago, IL
March 6, 2027; 3:30 p.m.		at George Washington						Charles E. Smith Center; Washington, D.C.
A-10 tournament
March 10–14, 2027; TBA		vs. TBD						Barclays Center; Brooklyn, NY
*Non-conference game. ^{#}Rankings from AP poll. (#) Tournament seedings in parentheses. All times are in Central Time.

== Rankings ==
Ranking movements
	Week																				
Poll	Pre	1	2	3	4	5	6	7	8	9	10	11	12	13	14	15	16	17	18	19	Final
AP																					
Coaches																					
