= 2026–27 Saint Louis Billikens men's basketball team =

American college basketball season

2026–27 Saint Louis Billikens men's basketball
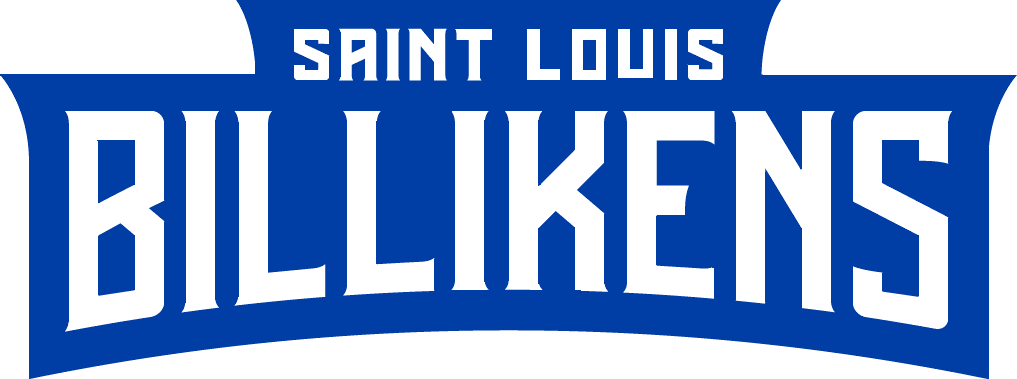
- Conference: Atlantic 10 Conference
- Record: 3–2 (0–0 A–10)
- Head coach: Josh Schertz (3rd season)
- Assistant coaches: Zak Boisvert; Antone Gray; Corey Tate; Rob Gardiner; Phil Gaetano
- Home arena: Chaifetz Arena

2026–27 Atlantic 10 men's basketball standings
| | Conf. | | | | Overall |
| Team | W | | L | PCT | W | | L | PCT |
|---|---|---|---|---|---|---|---|---|
| Duquesne | 0 | – | 0 | – | 5 | – | 0 | 1.000 |
| George Washington | 0 | – | 0 | – | 5 | – | 1 | .833 |
| Rhode Island | 0 | – | 0 | – | 5 | – | 1 | .833 |
| Saint Joseph's | 0 | – | 0 | – | 5 | – | 1 | .833 |
| Fordham | 0 | – | 0 | – | 4 | – | 1 | .800 |
| George Mason | 0 | – | 0 | – | 4 | – | 1 | .800 |
| St. Bonaventure | 0 | – | 0 | – | 4 | – | 1 | .800 |
| VCU | 0 | – | 0 | – | 3 | – | 1 | .750 |
| Davidson | 0 | – | 0 | – | 3 | – | 2 | .600 |
| Loyola Chicago | 0 | – | 0 | – | 3 | – | 2 | .600 |
| Saint Louis | 0 | – | 0 | – | 3 | – | 2 | .600 |
| Dayton | 0 | – | 0 | – | 3 | – | 3 | .500 |
| Richmond | 0 | – | 0 | – | 3 | – | 3 | .500 |
| La Salle | 0 | – | 0 | – | 2 | – | 3 | .400 |
† 2027 A-10 tournament winner As of November 21, 2026; Rankings from AP poll

The 2026–27 Saint Louis Billikens men's basketball team represents Saint Louis University during the 2026–27 NCAA Division I men's basketball season. The Billikens, led by third-year head coach Josh Schertz, play their home games at Chaifetz Arena in St. Louis, Missouri, as a member of the Atlantic 10 Conference.

Saint Louis opened the season with a 92–67 win over Lehigh, extending the program's school-record home winning streak to 23 games, and then defeated in-state rival Missouri 90–84 at Enterprise Center in the teams' first meeting in 25 years.

== Previous season ==
The Billikens finished the 2025–26 season with a school-record 29–6 record, going 15–3 in Atlantic 10 play to share the regular-season title with VCU. As the top seed in the A-10 tournament, they defeated George Washington in the quarterfinals before losing to Dayton 70–69 in the semifinals. The Billikens received an at-large bid to the NCAA tournament as the No. 9 seed in the Midwest Region, where they beat Georgia 102–77 in the first round before losing to top-seeded Michigan 95–72 in the second round. Center Robbie Avila was named A-10 Player of the Year.

== Offseason ==
=== Coaching staff ===
On March 13, 2026, Saint Louis and Schertz agreed in principle to a long-term contract extension. All five of Schertz's assistant coaches returned for the 2026–27 season.

=== Robbie Avila eligibility ===
After the 2025–26 season, Avila pursued a professional career and played for the Los Angeles Lakers summer league team, but was waived by the Lakers before the start of the NBA regular season. In late September 2026, he sued the NCAA seeking a fifth season of college eligibility, and on November 5 a Missouri judge granted him eligibility and barred the NCAA from enforcing its roster limits against him. The following day, the College Sports Commission denied Saint Louis's request to add Avila as a 16th player on its 15-man roster, and he did not play against Missouri; the school said Avila would continue to pursue his eligibility.

=== Departures ===
Saint Louis departures
| Name | Number | Pos. | Height | Weight | Year | Hometown | Reason for Departure |
|---|---|---|---|---|---|---|---|
| Jaden Schertz | 5 | G | 5'11" | 165 | Junior | Harrogate, Tennessee | Walk-on; left the team |
| Kalu Anya | 6 | F | 6'8" | 225 | Senior | Worcester, Massachusetts | Graduated |
| Brady Dunlap | 11 | F | 6'7" | 200 | (redshirt) Sophomore | Studio City, California | Transferred to Georgia |
| Dion Brown | 13 | G | 6'3" | 180 | Senior | Great Barrington, Massachusetts | Graduated |
| Robbie Avila | 21 | C | 6'10" | 240 | Senior | Oak Forest, Illinois | Graduated; pursuing eligibility (see above) |
| Paul Otieno | 25 | F | 6'9" | 230 | Senior | Nairobi, Kenya | Graduated |

=== Incoming transfers ===
Saint Louis incoming transfers
| Name | Number | Pos. | Height | Weight | Year | Hometown | Previous School |
|---|---|---|---|---|---|---|---|
| Sheek Pearson | 6 | F | 6'11" | 210 | Sophomore | St. Louis, Missouri | Marquette |
| Alon Michaeli | 7 | F | 6'9" | 235 | Sophomore | Kfar Saba, Israel | Colorado |
| Elijah Strong | 31 | F | 6'8" | 245 | Senior | Charlotte, North Carolina | Boston College |

=== 2026 recruiting class ===
Saint Louis 2026 recruiting class
| Name | Number | Pos. | Height | Weight | Hometown | High school |
|---|---|---|---|---|---|---|
| Jamison White | 10 | F | 6'8" | 240 | St. Louis, Missouri | East St. Louis |
| Jermel Thomas | 11 | G | 6'2" | 185 | Bronx, New York | Our Saviour Lutheran School |
| Yousaf Ahmad | 21 | G | 6'6" | 185 | Toronto, Ontario | King Heights Academy |

== Preseason ==
On October 19, 2026, the Atlantic 10 Conference released its preseason poll. Saint Louis was picked to finish second in the conference, one point behind VCU, while receiving ten first-place votes. Four Billikens earned preseason all-conference honors: Trey Green and Kellen Thames were named to the first team, Amari McCottry to the second team and Ishan Sharma to the third team, while McCottry and Thames were also named to the All-Defensive team.

=== Preseason rankings ===
Atlantic 10 Preseason Poll
| Place | Team | Votes |
|---|---|---|
| 1 | VCU | 308 (11) |
| 2 | Saint Louis | 307 (10) |
| 3 | Dayton | 279 (2) |
| 4 | George Mason | 240 |
| 5 | George Washington | 207 |
| 6 | Saint Joseph's | 181 |
| 7 | Fordham | 169 |
| 8 | Davidson | 144 |
| 9 | Richmond | 138 |
| 10 | Duquesne | 130 |
| 11 | Loyola Chicago | 116 |
| 12 | Rhode Island | 104 |
| 13 | La Salle | 59 |
| 14 | St. Bonaventure | 33 |
(#) first-place votes

=== Preseason All-Atlantic 10 Teams ===
Preseason All-Atlantic 10 Teams
| Team | Player | Year | Position |
|---|---|---|---|
| First | Trey Green | Senior | Guard |
| First | Kellen Thames | Graduate student | Guard |
| Second | Amari McCottry | Junior | Guard |
| Third | Ishan Sharma | Junior | Forward |
| All-Defensive | Amari McCottry | Junior | Guard |
| All-Defensive | Kellen Thames | Graduate student | Guard |

== Roster ==
2026–27 Saint Louis Billikens men's basketball team
Players
Coaches

| Pos. | # | Name | Height | Weight | Year | Previous school | Hometown |
|---|---|---|---|---|---|---|---|
| G | 0 | Kellen Thames | 6 ft 6 in (1.98 m) | 210 lb (95 kg) | GS | Pattonville High School | St. Louis, Missouri |
| G | 1 | Quentin Jones | 6 ft 5 in (1.96 m) | 190 lb (86 kg) | Sr | Northern Illinois | Chicago, Illinois |
| F | 2 | Badara Diakite | 6 ft 9 in (2.06 m) | 190 lb (86 kg) | So | South Kent School | Bamako, Mali |
| G | 3 | Trey Green | 6 ft 0 in (1.83 m) | 165 lb (75 kg) | Sr | Xavier | Charlotte, North Carolina |
| G | 4 | Amari McCottry | 6 ft 6 in (1.98 m) | 210 lb (95 kg) | Jr | St. Thomas More High School | Milwaukee, Wisconsin |
| F | 6 | Sheek Pearson | 6 ft 11 in (2.11 m) | 210 lb (95 kg) | So | Marquette | St. Louis, Missouri |
| F | 7 | Alon Michaeli | 6 ft 9 in (2.06 m) | 235 lb (107 kg) | So | Colorado | Kfar Saba, Israel |
| F | 9 | Ishan Sharma | 6 ft 5 in (1.96 m) | 195 lb (88 kg) | Jr | Virginia | Milton, Ontario |
| F | 10 | Jamison White | 6 ft 8 in (2.03 m) | 240 lb (109 kg) | Fr | East St. Louis Senior High School | St. Louis, Missouri |
| G | 11 | Jermel Thomas | 6 ft 2 in (1.88 m) | 185 lb (84 kg) | Fr | Our Saviour Lutheran School | Bronx, New York |
| G | 12 | Isaac Holmes (W) | 6 ft 4 in (1.93 m) | 215 lb (98 kg) | Sr | Apex High School | Apex, North Carolina |
| G | 14 | Luke Laczkowski | 6 ft 8 in (2.03 m) | 195 lb (88 kg) | So | St. Mark's School of Texas | Dallas, Texas |
| F | 15 | Jax Kerr | 6 ft 11 in (2.11 m) | 220 lb (100 kg) | So | Owasso High School | Muskogee, Oklahoma |
| G | 21 | Yousaf Ahmad | 6 ft 6 in (1.98 m) | 185 lb (84 kg) | Fr | King Heights Academy | Toronto, Ontario |
| G/F | 24 | Cam Hutson | 6 ft 5 in (1.96 m) | 205 lb (93 kg) | So | East Lansing High School | East Lansing, Michigan |
| F | 31 | Elijah Strong | 6 ft 8 in (2.03 m) | 245 lb (111 kg) | Sr | Boston College | Charlotte, North Carolina |

Head coach

- Josh Schertz (Florida Atlantic)

Assistant coach(es)

- Zak Boisvert (Fordham)
- Antone Gray (Rhode Island College)
- Corey Tate (Missouri)
- Rob Gardiner (Wright State)
- Phil Gaetano (Sacred Heart)

Legend

- (C) Team captain
- (S) Suspended
- (I) Ineligible
- (W) Walk-on
- Injured
- Current redshirt

Roster
Last update: November 8, 2026

== Schedule and results ==
| Date time, TV | Rank^{#} | Opponent^{#} | Result | Record | High points | High rebounds | High assists | Site (attendance) city, state |
Exhibition
| October 9, 2026*; 7:00 p.m. | | at Nebraska | W 79–74 | – | 11 – Tied | 9 – Kerr | 2 – Tied | Pinnacle Bank Arena (14,850); Lincoln, NE |
| October 23, 2026*; 7:00 p.m. | | Bradley | W 88–75 | – | 22 – Green | 10 – Thames | 4 – Green | Chaifetz Arena; St. Louis, MO |
Non-conference regular season
| November 2, 2026*; 7:00 p.m., KPLR/ESPN+ | | Lehigh | W 92–67 | 1–0 | 15 – Tied | 8 – Kerr | 3 – Jones | Chaifetz Arena (5,167); St. Louis, MO |
| November 6, 2026*; 6:00 p.m., ESPNU | | vs. Missouri; Show Me Showdown | W 90–84 | 2–0 | 17 – Tied | 9 – Michaeli | 6 – Tied | Enterprise Center (18,011); St. Louis, MO |
| November 10, 2026*; 7:00 p.m., ESPN+ | | Northern Kentucky | W 125–63 | 3–0 | 22 – Green | 7 – Tied | 9 – Jones | Chaifetz Arena (4,742); St. Louis, MO |
| November 15, 2026*; 2:00 p.m., ESPN2 | | High Point | L 58–68 | 3–1 | 13 – Thames | 10 – Thames | 9 – McCottry | Chaifetz Arena (6,566); St. Louis, MO |
| November 20, 2026*; 10:00 p.m., ESPN2 | | at Saint Mary's | L 78-95 | 3-2 | 21 – McCottry | Thames – 8 | 6 – Jones | University Credit Union Pavilion (3,409); Moraga, CA |
| November 24, 2026*; 8:30 p.m., CBSSN | | vs. Grand Canyon; Acrisure Series Pod 2 semifinal | | | | | | Acrisure Arena; Palm Desert, CA |
| November 25, 2026*; TBA, CBSSN | | vs. Colorado or Stanford; Acrisure Series Pod 2 | | | | | | Acrisure Arena; Palm Desert, CA |
| November 29, 2026*; 2:30 p.m., ESPN2 | | vs. South Florida; A-10/American Showcase | | | | | | Nationwide Arena; Columbus, OH |
| December 2, 2026*; 7:00 p.m., KPLR/ESPN+ | | Arkansas–Pine Bluff | | | | | | Chaifetz Arena; St. Louis, MO |
| December 6, 2026*; 1:00 p.m., USA | | Southeast Missouri State | | | | | | Chaifetz Arena; St. Louis, MO |
| December 12, 2026*; 5:30 p.m., USA | | DePaul | | | | | | Chaifetz Arena; St. Louis, MO |
| December 15, 2026*; 7:00 p.m., Matrix Midwest/ESPN+ | | Florida A&M | | | | | | Chaifetz Arena; St. Louis, MO |
| December 20, 2026*; 2:00 p.m., KPLR/ESPN+ | | Jackson State | | | | | | Chaifetz Arena; St. Louis, MO |
| December 27, 2026*; 2:00 p.m., KPLR/ESPN+ | | Missouri Baptist (NAIA) | | | | | | Chaifetz Arena; St. Louis, MO |
Atlantic 10 regular season
| December 30, 2026; 6:00 p.m., KSDK/ESPN+ | | at Fordham | | | | | | Rose Hill Gymnasium; Bronx, NY |
| January 2, 2027; 3:00 p.m., CBSSN | | St. Bonaventure | | | | | | Chaifetz Arena; St. Louis, MO |
| January 6, 2027; 7:00 p.m., CBSSN | | at Richmond | | | | | | Robins Center; Richmond, VA |
| January 9, 2027; 5:00 p.m., CBSSN | | Dayton | | | | | | Chaifetz Arena; St. Louis, MO |
| January 13, 2027; 6:00 p.m., CBSSN | | Loyola Chicago | | | | | | Chaifetz Arena; St. Louis, MO |
| January 20, 2027; 6:00 p.m., KSDK/ESPN+ | | at La Salle | | | | | | John Glaser Arena; Philadelphia, PA |
| January 23, 2027; 7:00 p.m., CBSSN | | at Saint Joseph's | | | | | | Hagan Arena; Philadelphia, PA |
| January 26, 2027; 6:00 p.m., CBSSN | | Rhode Island | | | | | | Chaifetz Arena; St. Louis, MO |
| January 29, 2027; 5:00 p.m., ESPN2 | | at Dayton | | | | | | UD Arena; Dayton, OH |
| February 5, 2027; 6:00 p.m., ESPN2 | | VCU | | | | | | Chaifetz Arena; St. Louis, MO |
| February 9, 2027; 7:00 p.m., CBSSN | | at Loyola Chicago | | | | | | Joseph J. Gentile Arena; Chicago, IL |
| February 12, 2027; 6:00 p.m., ESPN2 | | Saint Joseph's | | | | | | Chaifetz Arena; St. Louis, MO |
| February 16, 2027; 6:00 p.m., CBSSN | | Davidson | | | | | | Chaifetz Arena; St. Louis, MO |
| February 19, 2027; 6:00 p.m., ESPN2 | | at VCU | | | | | | Siegel Center; Richmond, VA |
| February 24, 2027; 7:00 p.m., KSDK/ESPN+ | | La Salle | | | | | | Chaifetz Arena; St. Louis, MO |
| February 27, 2027; 7:00 p.m., CBSSN | | at George Washington | | | | | | Charles E. Smith Center; Washington, D.C. |
| March 3, 2027; 6:00 p.m., KSDK/ESPN+ | | at Duquesne | | | | | | UPMC Cooper Fieldhouse; Pittsburgh, PA |
| March 6, 2027; 1:30 p.m., USA | | George Mason | | | | | | Chaifetz Arena; St. Louis, MO |
A-10 tournament
| March 2027; TBA | | vs. TBD | | | | | | TBD |
*Non-conference game. ^{#}Rankings from AP poll. (#) Tournament seedings in parentheses. All times are in Central Time.

== Rankings ==
Ranking movements Legend: RV = Received votes
| | Week | | | | | | | | | | | | | | | | | | | | |
| Poll | Pre | 1 | 2 | 3 | 4 | 5 | 6 | 7 | 8 | 9 | 10 | 11 | 12 | 13 | 14 | 15 | 16 | 17 | 18 | 19 | Final |
|---|---|---|---|---|---|---|---|---|---|---|---|---|---|---|---|---|---|---|---|---|---|
| AP | RV | RV | RV | | | | | | | | | | | | | | | | | | |
| Coaches | RV | RV | RV | | | | | | | | | | | | | | | | | | |
