= 2026–27 Davidson Wildcats men's basketball team =

American college basketball season

2026–27 Davidson Wildcats men's basketball
- Conference: Atlantic 10 Conference
- Record: 3–1 (0–0 A-10)
- Head coach: Matt McKillop (5th season)
- Assistant coaches: Matt Matheny; Will Reigel; Joshua Heyliger; Jack Gibbs; Victor Taylor
- Home arena: John M. Belk Arena

2026–27 Atlantic 10 men's basketball standings
	Conf.				Overall
Team	W		L	PCT	W		L	PCT
Rhode Island	0	–	0	–	5	–	0	1.000
Duquesne	0	–	0	–	4	–	0	1.000
George Washington	0	–	0	–	4	–	0	1.000
Saint Joseph's	0	–	0	–	4	–	0	1.000
Davidson	0	–	0	–	3	–	1	.750
George Mason	0	–	0	–	3	–	1	.750
Fordham	0	–	0	–	3	–	1	.750
Loyola Chicago	0	–	0	–	3	–	1	.750
Richmond	0	–	0	–	3	–	1	.750
St. Bonaventure	0	–	0	–	3	–	1	.750
Saint Louis	0	–	0	–	3	–	1	.750
VCU	0	–	0	–	2	–	1	.667
La Salle	0	–	0	–	1	–	3	.250
Dayton	0	–	0	–	1	–	3	.250
† 2027 A-10 tournament winner As of November 17, 2026; Rankings from AP poll

The 2026–27 Davidson Wildcats men's basketball team will represent Davidson College during the 2026–27 NCAA Division I men's basketball season. The Wildcats were led by fifth-year head coach Matt McKillop, and played their home games at the John M. Belk Arena located in Davidson, North Carolina as members of the Atlantic 10 Conference (A-10).

== Previous season ==
The Wildcats finished the 2025–26 season 20–14, 10–18 in A-10 play, to finish in sixth place. As a 6 seed, they defeated Loyola Chicago in the first round of the A-10 tournament, before losing to Saint Joseph's in the second round.

== Roster ==
2026–27 Davidson Wildcats men's basketball team
Players
Coaches

Pos.	#	Name	Height	Weight	Year	Previous school	Hometown
G	2	Eetu Heininen	6 ft 4 in (1.93 m)	206 lb (93 kg)	Fr	Dreamland Gran Canaria	Espoo, Finland
G	3	Nick Coval	6 ft 2 in (1.88 m)	180 lb (82 kg)	RS So	Parkland High School	Orefield, Pennsylvania
F	4	Josh Scovens	6 ft 6 in (1.98 m)	230 lb (104 kg)	Sr	Army	Greensboro, North Carolina
F	5	Jackson Keith	6 ft 5 in (1.96 m)	228 lb (103 kg)	So	Butler	Durham, North Carolina
G	10	Malik Davis	6 ft 5 in (1.96 m)	200 lb (91 kg)	Fr	Geelong United	Geelong, Australia
G	11	Sam Brown	6 ft 3 in (1.91 m)	191 lb (87 kg)	Sr	Penn	Merion Station, Pennsylvania
G	14	Phillip Kavu	6 ft 2 in (1.88 m)	172 lb (78 kg)	RS So	Lake Forest Academy	Manchester, England
G	15	John Carter Jr.	6 ft 4 in (1.93 m)	205 lb (93 kg)	Sr	Summit High School	Nashville, Tennessee
F/C	16	Ian Platteeuw	7 ft 0 in (2.13 m)	250 lb (113 kg)	So	Joventut Badalona	Barcelona, Spain
F	24	JaQualon "JQ" Roberts	6 ft 8 in (2.03 m)	239 lb (108 kg)	Sr	Vanderbilt	Bloomington, Indiana
G	25	Nick Janowski	6 ft 4 in (1.93 m)	210 lb (95 kg)	RS So	St. Thomas	Pewaukee, Wisconsin
F	28	Tom Stoiber	6 ft 8 in (2.03 m)	225 lb (102 kg)	Fr	Nuremberg Falcons BC	Nuremberg, Germany
F	35	Quadri "Bash" Bashiru	6 ft 9 in (2.06 m)	218 lb (99 kg)	RS Fr	Longwood	Ibadan, Nigeria
F	50	John Nowland	6 ft 8 in (2.03 m)	218 lb (99 kg)	Sr	Saint George's School	Spokane, Washington
G	53	Honor Withers Carello	6 ft 5 in (1.96 m)	190 lb (86 kg)	Fr	The Peddie School	Lawrenceville, New Jersey

Head coach

- Matt McKillop (Davidson)

Assistant coach(es)

- Will Reigel (Davidson)
- Matt Matheny (Davidson)
- Joshua Heyliger (Stonehill)
- Jack Gibbs (Davidson)
- Victor Taylor (Davidson)

Legend

- (C) Team captain
- (S) Suspended
- (I) Ineligible
- (W) Walk-on
- Injured
- Current redshirt

Roster
Last update: October 18, 2026

== Schedule and results ==
Date time, TV	Rank^{#}	Opponent^{#}	Result	Record	High points	High rebounds	High assists	Site (attendance) city, state
Non-conference regular season
November 2, 2026*; 9:00 p.m., YouTube		at Washington State	W 76–61	1–0	22 – Brown	9 – Platteeuw	8 – Platteeuw	Beasley Coliseum (2,530); Pullman, WA
November 7, 2026*; 7:00 p.m., ESPN+		Mercer	W 88–76	2–0	25 – Janowski	12 – Platteuw	3 – Tied	Belk Arena (2,466); Davidson, NC
November 10, 2026*; 7:00 p.m., ESPN+		Bradley	W 62–45	3–0	12 – Tied	14 – Platteeuw	3 – Brown	Belk Arena (2,036); Davidson, NC
November 14, 2026*; 7:00 p.m., ESPN+		Howard	L 58–64	3–1	15 – Janowski	11 – Scovens	2 – Tied	Belk Arena (2,340); Davidson, NC
November 17, 2026*; 7:00 p.m., ESPN+		Charlotte						Belk Arena; Davidson, NC
November 23, 2026*; 11:00 a.m., PTB Live		vs. Northern Iowa; Fort Myers Tip-Off – Palms division						Suncoast Credit Union Arena; Fort Myers, FL
November 25, 2026*; 1:30 p.m., PTB Live		vs. Tulane; Fort Myers Tip-Off – Palms division						Suncoast Credit Union Arena; Fort Myers, FL
November 29, 2026*; 2:00 p.m.		at Florida Atlantic						Eleanor R. Baldwin Arena; Boca Raton, FL
December 2, 2026*; 7:00 p.m., ESPN+		Dartmouth						Belk Arena; Davidson, NC
December 6, 2026*; 3:30 p.m., FloCollege		at Charleston						TD Arena; Charleston, SC
December 9, 2026*; 7:30 p.m., ESPN+		Campbell						Belk Arena; Davidson, NC
December 12, 2026*; 4:00 p.m., ESPN+		USC Upstate						Belk Arena; Davidson, NC
December 18, 2026*; 7:00 p.m., CBSSN		vs. Drake; Hall of Fame Classic						T-Mobile Center; Kansas City, MO
December 22, 2026*; 2:00 p.m., ESPN+		UT Martin						Belk Arena; Davidson, NC
A10 Regular Season
December 30, 2026; 7:00 p.m.		at Duquesne						UPMC Cooper Fieldhouse; Pittsburgh, PA
January 2, 2027; 2:30 p.m., USA Network		Dayton						Belk Arena; Davidson, NC
January 6, 2027; 6:00 p.m., CBSSN		at VCU						Siegel Center; Richmond, VA
January 9, 2027; 2:30 p.m., USA Network		Richmond						Belk Arena; Davidson, NC
January 16, 2027; 2:30 p.m., USA Network		at Loyola Chicago						Joseph J. Gentile Arena; Chicago, IL
January 20, 2027; 7:00 p.m.		Fordham						Belk Arena; Davidson, NC
January 23, 2027; 2:00 p.m.		at La Salle						John Glaser Arena; Philadelphia, PA
January 27, 2027; 7:00 p.m.		Saint Joseph's						Belk Arena; Davidson, NC
January 30, 2027; 6:00 p.m., CBSSN		Loyola Chicago						Belk Arena; Davidson, NC
February 3, 2027; 7:00 p.m.		at Richmond						Robins Center; Richmond, VA
February 7, 2027; 2:00 p.m.		at Rhode Island						Ryan Center; Kingston, RI
February 10, 2026; 7:00 p.m.		St. Bonaventure						Belk Arena; Davidson, NC
February 13, 2027; 2:00 p.m., USA Network		George Mason						Belk Arena; Davidson, NC
February 16, 2027; 7:00 p.m., CBSSN		at Saint Louis						Chaifetz Arena; St. Louis, MO
February 24, 2027; 7:00 p.m.		George Washington						Belk Arena; Davidson, NC
February 27, 2027; 2:30 p.m., USA Network		at Saint Joseph's						Hagan Arena; Philadelphia, PA
March 3, 2027; 7:00 p.m.		at Fordham						Rose Hill Gymnasium; Bronx, NY
March 6, 2027; 2:00 p.m.		Duquesne						Belk Arena; Davidson, NC
Atlantic 10 tournament
March 10–14, 2027; TBA		vs.						Barclays Center; Brooklyn, NY
*Non-conference game. ^{#}Rankings from AP poll. (#) Tournament seedings in parentheses. T=Tulsa. All times are in Eastern Time.
