= 2026–27 Duquesne Dukes men's basketball team =

American college basketball season

2026–27 Duquesne Dukes men's basketball
- Conference: Atlantic 10 Conference
- Record: 5–0 (0–0 A–10)
- Head coach: Dru Joyce III (3rd season)
- Assistant coaches: Rick McFadden; Karl Hobbs; Ari Stern; Derrick Allen; Chase Goldstein; Darik Artis
- Home arena: UPMC Cooper Fieldhouse

2026–27 Atlantic 10 men's basketball standings
	Conf.				Overall
Team	W		L	PCT	W		L	PCT
Duquesne	0	–	0	–	5	–	0	1.000
Rhode Island	0	–	0	–	5	–	0	1.000
Saint Joseph's	0	–	0	–	5	–	0	1.000
George Washington	0	–	0	–	5	–	1	.833
Fordham	0	–	0	–	4	–	1	.800
George Mason	0	–	0	–	4	–	1	.800
St. Bonaventure	0	–	0	–	4	–	1	.800
Saint Louis	0	–	0	–	3	–	1	.750
VCU	0	–	0	–	3	–	1	.750
Davidson	0	–	0	–	3	–	2	.600
Loyola Chicago	0	–	0	–	3	–	2	.600
Richmond	0	–	0	–	3	–	2	.600
Dayton	0	–	0	–	2	–	3	.400
La Salle	0	–	0	–	2	–	3	.400
† 2027 A-10 tournament winner As of November 20, 2026; Rankings from AP poll

The 2026–27 Duquesne Dukes men's basketball team will Duquesne University during the 2026–27 NCAA Division I men's basketball season. The Dukes, led by second-year head coach Dru Joyce III, played their home games at the UPMC Cooper Fieldhouse in Pittsburgh, Pennsylvania as a member of the Atlantic 10 Conference (A-10).

== Previous season ==
The Dukes finished the 2025–26 season 18–15 overall and 9–9 in A-10 play, placing seventh in the conference in their second season under head coach Dru Joyce III. Duquesne's season ended in the second round of the A-10 tournament, where they fell to VCU 71-66.

== Offseason ==
=== Departures ===
Name	Number	Pos.	Height	Weight	Year	Hometown	Reason for departure
David Dixon	2	F	6'9"	230	Sr.	Memphis, Tennessee	Graduated
Jimmie Williams	3	G	6'5"	210	Jr.	Solon, Ohio	Transferred to Ohio State
John Hugley IV	4	F	6'10"	265	GS	Cleveland, Ohio	Graduated
Cam Crawford	5	G	6'5"	205	(redshirt) Sr.	Birmingham, Alabama	Graduated
Alex Williams	6	F	6'5"	225	GS	Dayton, Ohio	Graduated
Dom Aekins	7	G	5'10"	155	Fr.	Columbus, Ohio	Transferred to Youngstown State
Jakub Nečas	9	F	6'10"	240	Jr.	Blansko, Czech Republic	Transferred to South Carolina
Stef van Bussel	18	C	6'10"	265	(redshirt) So.	Ommel, Netherlands	Transferred to South Dakota
Lazar Milošević	27	F	6'10"	258	Fr.	Bileća, Republika Srpska, Bosnia and Herzegovina	Transferred to Longwood

=== Incoming transfers ===
Name	Number	Pos.	Height	Weight	Year	Hometown	Previous school
Stephen Olowoniyi	3	G	6'8"	210	Senior	Melbourne, Australia	Oregon State
Izaiah Pasha	4	G	6'5"	205	Junior	Harrisburg, Pennsylvania	Virginia Tech
Ege Demir	16	C	6'11"	275	Senior	Kaduna, Nigeria	Oregon
Josh Smith	19	G	6'3"	185	Senior	Chicago, Illinois	West Georgia
Kerem Konan	20	F	6'9"	235	Junior	Denizli, Türkiye	Creighton
Yoav Berman	42	G	6'6"	215	Junior	Ganei Tikva, Israel	Queens

=== 2026 recruiting class ===
There were no incoming recruits for the class of 2024.

== Roster ==
2025–26 Duquesne Dukes men's basketball team
Players
Coaches

Pos.	#	Name	Height	Weight	Year	Previous school	Hometown
G	0	Brandon Hall	6 ft 4 in (1.93 m)	190 lb (86 kg)	RS Sr	Thornton Township; Howard College	Chicago, IL
G	1	Tarence Guinyard	6 ft 2 in (1.88 m)	170 lb (77 kg)	RS Sr	Lee High School (FL); UT Martin	Tampa, FL
F	3	Stephen Olowoniyi	6 ft 8 in (2.03 m)	210 lb (95 kg)	Sr	The Webb School; Oregon State	Melbourne, Australia
G	4	Izaiah Pasha	6 ft 5 in (1.96 m)	205 lb (93 kg)	Jr	Cardinal O'Hara; Virginia Tech	Harrisburg, PA
G/F	5	Zoje Owinje	6 ft 7 in (2.01 m)	195 lb (88 kg)	Fr	Clinton Grace Christian School	Bowie, MD
G	8	Arness Lawson	6 ft 2 in (1.88 m)	180 lb (82 kg)	RS Fr	Pickerington North	Columbus, OH
G	14	Jackson Williams	6 ft 5 in (1.96 m)	170 lb (77 kg)	Fr	Spire Academy	Atlanta, GA
C	16	Ege Demir	6 ft 11 in (2.11 m)	275 lb (125 kg)	Sr	Darüssafaka Lassa; Oregon	Kaduna, Nigeria
F	17	Frederik Jellum	6 ft 10 in (2.08 m)	210 lb (95 kg)	RS Fr	Cushing Academy	Copenhagen, Denmark
G/F	18	Chaim Galbut	6 ft 7 in (2.01 m)	195 lb (88 kg)	Fr	Miami Country Day	Miami, FL
G	19	Josh Smith	6 ft 3 in (1.91 m)	185 lb (84 kg)	Sr	The Skill Factory; West Georgia	Chicago, IL
F	20	Kerem Konan	6 ft 9 in (2.06 m)	235 lb (107 kg)	Jr	Doga College; Creighton	Denizli, Türkiye
F	21	Dimitris Ntapsis	6 ft 11 in (2.11 m)	280 lb (127 kg)	Fr	Veritas Academy (CA)	Athens, Greece
G	32	Ethan Anish	6 ft 1 in (1.85 m)	187 lb (85 kg)	RS Jr	Taylor Allderdice	Pittsburgh, PA
G/F	42	Yoav Berman	6 ft 6 in (1.98 m)	215 lb (98 kg)	Jr	Queens	Ganei Tikva, Israel
G	44	Jake DiMichele	6 ft 4 in (1.93 m)	185 lb (84 kg)	RS Jr	OLSH; First Love Christian Academy	McKees Rocks, PA

Head coach

- Dru Joyce III (Akron)

Assistant coach(es)

- Rick McFadden (Akron)
- Karl Hobbs (Connecticut)
- Ari Stern (The College of Wooster)
- Derrick Allen (Mississippi)
- Chase Goldstein (Florida Gulf Coast)
- Darik Artis (Ohio State)

Legend

- (C) Team captain
- (S) Suspended
- (I) Ineligible
- (W) Walk-on
- Injured
- Current redshirt

Roster
Last update: November 12, 2025

== Schedule and results ==
Date time, TV	Rank^{#}	Opponent^{#}	Result	Record	High points	High rebounds	High assists	Site (attendance) city, state
Non-conference regular season
November 3, 2026*; 7:00 p.m., ESPN+		Purdue Fort Wayne	W 78–71	1–0	16 – Tied	9 – Konan	5 – Pasha	UPMC Cooper Fieldhouse (2,758); Pittsburgh, PA
November 7, 2026*; 7:30 p.m., ESPN+		Central State	W 68–58	2–0	22 – Berman	8 – Tied	4 – Berman	UPMC Cooper Fieldhouse (2,129); Pittsburgh, PA
November 10, 2026*; 7:00 p.m., ESPN+		Washington State	W 72–71	3–0	13 – Tied	7 – Berman	9 – Konan	UPMC Cooper Fieldhouse (2,377); Pittsburgh, PA
November 14, 2026*; 7:30 p.m.		Binghamton	W 71–58	4–0	16 – Konan	10 – Konan	6 – Berman	UPMC Cooper Fieldhouse (2,411); Pittsburgh, PA
November 18, 2026*; 7:00 p.m.		Howard; Sunshine Slam Campus Game	W 74–68	5–0	18 – Smith	8 – Konan	4 – Lawson	UPMC Cooper Fieldhouse (2,208); Pittsburgh, PA
November 22, 2026*; 2:00 p.m.		vs. Wyoming; Sunshine Slam						Ocean Center; Daytona Beach, FL
November 24, 2026*; 7:30 p.m.		vs. High Point						UPMC Cooper Fieldhouse; Pittsburgh, PA
November 28, 2026*; 7:30 p.m.		South Carolina State						UPMC Cooper Fieldhouse; Pittsburgh, PA
December 5, 2026*; TBA		vs. Kansas City; Morgan & Morgan Classic						LeBron James Arena; Akron, OH
December 9, 2026*; 8:30 p.m.		vs. Robert Morris; Hope Gas Backyard Basketball Classic						PPG Paints Arena; Pittsburgh, PA
December 12, 2026*; 7:30 p.m.		Canisius						UPMC Cooper Fieldhouse; Pittsburgh, PA
December 15, 2026*; 7:00 p.m.		Delaware						UPMC Cooper Fieldhouse; Pittsburgh, PA
December 20, 2026*; 2:00 p.m.		Niagara						UPMC Cooper Fieldhouse; Pittsburgh, PA
December 27, 2026*; 2:00 p.m.		Cleary						UPMC Cooper Fieldhouse; Pittsburgh, PA
Atlantic 10 regular season
December 30, 2026; 7:00 p.m.		Davidson						UPMC Cooper Fieldhouse; Pittsburgh, PA
January 2, 2027; 12:30 p.m., USA		at VCU						Siegel Center; Richmond, VA
January 6, 2027; 7:00 p.m.		Rhode Island						UPMC Cooper Fieldhouse; Pittsburgh, PA
January 9, 2027; 2:00 p.m.		at Loyola Chicago						Joseph J. Gentile Arena; Chicago, IL
January 16, 2027; 7:00 p.m.		Fordham						UPMC Cooper Fieldhouse; Pittsburgh, PA
January 20, 2027; 7:00 p.m.		at Richmond						Robins Center; Richmond, VA
January 23, 2027; 1:00 p.m.		at Rhode Island						Ryan Center; Kingston, RI
January 26, 2027; 7:00 p.m., ESPN+		Dayton						UPMC Cooper Fieldhouse; Pittsburgh, PA
January 30, 2027; 2:00 p.m.		St. Bonaventure						UPMC Cooper Fieldhouse; Pittsburgh, PA
February 3, 2027; 7:00 p.m.		at George Washington						Charles E. Smith Center; Washington, D.C.
February 6, 2027; 2:00 p.m.		Loyola Chicago						UPMC Cooper Fieldhouse; Pittsburgh, PA
February 10, 2027; 7:00 p.m.		at La Salle						John Glaser Arena; Philadelphia, PA
February 13, 2027; 12:00 p.m.		at Dayton						University of Dayton Arena; Dayton, OH
February 20. 2027; 12:30 p.m.		George Mason						UPMC Cooper Fieldhouse; Pittsburgh, PA
February 24, 2027; 7:00 p.m.		Saint Joseph's						UPMC Cooper Fieldhouse; Pittsburgh, PA
February 27, 2027; 2:00 p.m.		at St. Bonaventure						Reilly Center; St. Bonaventure, NY
March 3, 2027; 7:00 p.m.		Saint Louis						UPMC Cooper Fieldhouse; Pittsburgh, PA
March 6, 2027; 2:00 p.m.		at Davidson						John M. Belk Arena; Davidson, NC
A-10 tournament
March 11-14, 2026; TBA		vs.						Barclays Center; Brooklyn, NY
*Non-conference game. ^{#}Rankings from AP poll. (#) Tournament seedings in parentheses. All times are in Eastern.
