= 2027 America East Conference men's basketball tournament =

American college basketball postseason tournament

2027 America East men's basketball tournament
- Classification: Division I
- Season: 2026–27
- Teams: 8
- Site: Campus sites
- Television: ESPN+, ESPN2

2026–27 America East Conference men's basketball standings
	Conf.				Overall
Team	W		L	PCT	W		L	PCT
Albany	0	–	0	–	0	–	0	–
Binghamton	0	–	0	–	0	–	0	–
Bryant	0	–	0	–	0	–	0	–
Maine	0	–	0	–	0	–	0	–
New Hampshire	0	–	0	–	0	–	0	–
NJIT	0	–	0	–	0	–	0	–
UMass Lowell	0	–	0	–	0	–	0	–
UMBC	0	–	0	–	0	–	0	–
Vermont	0	–	0	–	0	–	0	–
† 2027 AmEast tournament winner

The 2027 America East Men's Basketball Conference tournament will be the 2027 postseason men's basketball tournament for the America East Conference. It will be held March 6-13, 2027, at campus sites of the higher seeds. The tournament winner will receive the automatic bid to the NCAA Tournament.

== Seeds ==
Eight of the nine America East teams will qualify for the tournament The teams will be seeded by conference record, with a tiebreaking system to seed teams with identical conference records.

Seed	School	AEC Record	Tiebreaker
1			
2			
3			
4			
5			
6			
7			
8			
DNQ			

== Schedule ==
Game	Time*	Matchup^{#}	Score	Television
Quarterfinals – Saturday, March 6
1				
2				
3				
4				
Semifinals – Tuesday, March 9
5				
6				
Championship – Saturday, March 14
7				
*Game times in EST. #-Rankings denote tournament seeding.

== Bracket ==
Quarterfinals; Saturday, March 6 ESPN+
1
8
4
5
(Pairings are reseeded after the first round)
2
7
3
6

Semifinals; Tuesday, March 9 ESPN+

Championship; Saturday, March 14; ESPN2

== See also ==
- 2027 America East women's basketball tournament
