= 2026–27 NCAA Division I men's basketball season =

Men's basketball season in the United States

- Number of teams: 365
- Preseason AP No. 1: Florida
- Regular season: November 1, 2026 – March 14, 2027
- NCAA Tournament: 2027
- Tournament dates: March 16, 2027 – April 5, 2027
- National Championship: Ford Field; Detroit, Michigan

The 2026–27 NCAA Division I men's basketball season began on November 1, 2026 and will end on March 14, 2027. The regular season will be followed by conference tournaments, and then by national postseason tournaments headed by the NCAA tournament. That tournament will begin with the March Madness Opening Round on March 16, 2027 and end with the championship game at Ford Field in Detroit, Michigan on April 5.

== Rule changes ==
On May 8, 2026 the following rules were modified:

- 10-second backcourt violations will be called when the shot clock reaches 19 seconds, rather than 20.
- The game clock must run before a second timeout is granted when two media timeouts would otherwise occur consecutively.

The 31 regular-season game limit was increased to 32 this season. The previous limit was for 28 or 29 regular season games plus a tournament or Multi-team event (MTE) allowance. The updated legislation removes these MTE requirements, allowing schools to schedule the full 32 games in various combinations.

In addition, the 60-day window for a player to enter the transfer portal has been shortened to 15 days, starting from the tournament title game. Another 15-day transfer window is allowed when a head coaching change is announced. Any players transferring schools outside these windows will be required to sit out for one year pending a waiver.

== Season headlines ==
- April 8, 2026 – Ross Dellenger of Yahoo Sports reported that NCAA Division I was considering a new athletic eligibility framework. Under the proposal, D-I athletes would have five full years of eligibility, starting on their 19th birthday or high school graduation, whichever is sooner. No redshirting would be allowed, even for medical reasons. Existing eligibility waivers for military service, religious missions, or (for women) maternity leave, would not be affected.
- April 10 — UC Santa Barbara announced it would return to the West Coast Conference (WCC) for the 2027–28 season after having been absent for nearly 60 years. UCSB had been a WCC member from 1964–1969, but left to join the Pacific Coast Athletic Association, now known as the Big West Conference, and had been in the PCAA/Big West ever since, except for a stint as a Division I independent from 1974–1976.
- April 17 – Notre Dame and Villanova announced that their men's and women's teams would open the 2026–27 season with a November 1 doubleheader in Rome. The schools noted that the event was inspired by Pope Leo XIV's background as an Augustinian friar and Villanova alumnus.
- May 7 – The NCAA Division I men's basketball tournament will expand to 76 teams starting with the 2026–27 season. This change would also be applied to the women's tournament as well.
- May 27 – The Metro Atlantic Athletic Conference announced that it would rename itself as the Metro Conference effective July 1.
- June 5 – The NCAA Division I Cabinet slightly modified the age-based eligibility proposal, addressing concerns raised by the men's basketball and men's ice hockey communities, as well as the service academies. Under the new proposal, expected to be voted on by the end of June, athletes' eligibility clocks would start upon their full-time college enrollment or the start of the academic year following their 19th birthday, whichever is sooner.
- June 23 – The Division I Cabinet unanimously approved the age-based eligibility proposal as modified earlier that month, officially taking effect with the end of the Cabinet's meeting the next day. Students enrolling full-time in college for the first time in 2026, plus those who had remaining eligibility under previous rules at the end of 2025–26, can use whichever model is most advantageous to them. Those who exhausted their eligibility under previous rules in 2025–26 will not receive any additional eligibility, even if they initially enrolled in 2022–23 (giving them four years of eligibility).
- June 24 – On the same day the new age-based eligibility model took effect, a group of 15 college basketball players, all of whom graduated from high school in 2022 and exhausted their eligibility under the previous rules in 2025–26, filed suit in Hamilton County, Ohio challenging the application of the new model to their high school cohort. Other suits on similar grounds were expected to be filed in other states.
- June 26 – The Coastal Athletic Association announced that Fairfield would join from the Metro Conference in July 2027.
- July 1 – The University of New Orleans rejoined the Louisiana State University System, adopting the new name of LSU New Orleans. The university's athletic brand changed accordingly, retaining the Privateers nickname but changing colors from blue and white to LSU's purple and gold.
- July 31 – Rulings in two separate court cases undercut the NCAA's planned "five for five" eligibility model as applied to 2022 high school graduates. First, a Tennessee state court judge granted a temporary injunction that allowed 19 basketball players in that class an extra season of eligibility. Several hours later, a federal judge in Colorado issued a preliminary injunction that applied to all members of the high school class of 2022 who had exhausted athletic eligibility, regardless of sport, and also provided those individuals an extra season of eligibility. The NCAA was expected to appeal.
- October 12 – The American Conference announced that James Madison would join from the Sun Belt Conference (SBC) effective no later than July 1, 2028 for all sports.
- October 21 – The Associated Press named its preseason All-America team. The team consisted of Michigan State guard Jeremy Fears Jr. (57 votes), Florida forward Thomas Haugh (56), Vanderbilt guard Tyler Tanner (43), Illinois forward David Mirković (24) and Arizona center Motiejus Krivas (17).
- October 22
  - The Metro Conference announced that Le Moyne would join from the NEC in July 2027.
  - Villanova announced it would pull out of the Philadelphia Big 5 men's basketball series after the 2026–27 edition. Villanova and the other five schools (Drexel, La Salle, Penn, Saint Joseph's, and Temple) could not agree on a format, and the non-Villanova schools announced they would return to a round-robin series starting in 2027–28.
- November 13 – The Metro Conference announced that Stonehill would also join from the NEC in July 2027.
- November 19 – James Madison and the SBC reached a settlement that pushed the Dukes' departure date from that conference forward to July 2027.

=== Milestones and records ===
- During the season, the following players reached the 2,000-career-point milestone: Mississippi State guard Josh Hubbard, and TCU center Robbie Avila.
- November 2 — UConn coach Dan Hurley earned his 200th win as the coach of the Huskies, following an 86–46 win over Gardner–Webb.
- November 14 — Cincinnati coach Jerrod Calhoun earned his 300th career win after the Bearcats won on the road at Dayton, 95–72.

== Conference membership changes ==
A total of 29 schools are playing in new conferences for the 2026–27 season. The Pac-12 Conference resumed full operation after a two-season hiatus, with legacy members Oregon State and Washington State joined by seven new members. Another 18 schools moved within Division I, one started reclassification from NCAA Division II, and one started reclassification to NCAA Division III. This does not include the three legacy Western Athletic Conference members (Abilene Christian, Tarleton State, UT Arlington) that remained members through that conference's renaming as the United Athletic Conference.

| School | Former conference | Current conference |
|---|---|---|
| Austin Peay | Atlantic Sun | United Athletic |
| Boise State | Mountain West | Pac-12 |
| California Baptist | Western Athletic | Big West |
| Central Arkansas | Atlantic Sun | United Athletic |
| Colorado State | Mountain West | Pac-12 |
| Denver | Summit League | West Coast |
| Eastern Kentucky | Atlantic Sun | United Athletic |
| Fresno State | Mountain West | Pac-12 |
| Gonzaga | West Coast | Pac-12 |
| Hawaii | Big West | Mountain West |
| Little Rock | Ohio Valley | United Athletic |
| Louisiana Tech | CUSA | Sun Belt |
| North Alabama | Atlantic Sun | United Athletic |
| Northern Illinois | MAC | Horizon |
| Oregon State | West Coast | Pac-12 |
| Sacramento State | Big Sky | Big West |
| Saint Francis | NEC | PAC (D–III) |
| San Diego State | Mountain West | Pac-12 |
| Southern Utah | Western Athletic | Big Sky |
| Tennessee Tech | Ohio Valley | Southern |
| Texas State | Sun Belt | Pac-12 |
| UC Davis | Big West | Mountain West |
| UTEP | CUSA | Mountain West |
| Utah State | Mountain West | Pac-12 |
| Utah Tech | Western Athletic | Big Sky |
| Utah Valley | Western Athletic | Big West |
| Washington State | West Coast | Pac-12 |
| West Florida | Gulf South (D–II) | Atlantic Sun |
| West Georgia | Atlantic Sun | United Athletic |

The 2026–27 season is the last in their respective conferences for at least six Division I schools.

| School | 2026–27 conference | Future conference |
|---|---|---|
| Fairfield | Metro | CAA |
| James Madison | Sun Belt | American |
| Le Moyne | NEC | Metro |
| Stonehill | NEC | Metro |
| UC San Diego | Big West | West Coast |
| UC Santa Barbara | Big West | West Coast |

== Arenas ==
=== New arenas ===
IU Indy left the IU Indy Gymnasium, also known as The Jungle, after 44 seasons for the new James T. Morris Arena. The arena opened on October 16, 2026 with a women's volleyball match between IU Indy and Wright State, followed by the first basketball game on November 2, with the Jaguars defeating the Miami Middletown Thunderhawks 113–76.

=== Planned openings for 2027 ===
The 2026–27 season is intended to be the last for at least two Division I schools in their current venues.

- Nevada will move men's basketball from the on-campus Lawlor Events Center to a new off-campus arena being built as part of a major expansion of the Grand Sierra Resort casino, with women's basketball remaining at Lawlor.
- Western Michigan will move men's and women's basketball from the teams' current on-campus home of University Arena to the new Kalamazoo Event Center in downtown Kalamazoo.

== Seasonal outlook ==
The Top 25 from the AP and USA Today Coaching polls

=== Preseason polls ===
AP
| Ranking | Team |
|---|---|
| 1 | Florida (47) |
| 2 | Duke (10) |
| 3 | Illinois (2) |
| 4 | UConn |
| 5 | Arizona |
| 6 | Michigan State |
| 7 | Texas |
| 8 | Tennessee |
| 9 | Virginia |
| 10 | Houston |
| 11 | Louisville |
| 12 | Arkansas |
| 13 | St. John's |
| 14 | Miami (FL) |
| 15 | Gonzaga |
| 16 | Michigan |
| 17 | Kansas |
| 18 | Iowa State |
| 19 | Texas Tech |
| 20 | Alabama |
| 21 | USC |
| 22 | UCLA |
| 23 | Kentucky |
| 24 | Vanderbilt |
| 25 | BYU |

USA Today Coaches
| Ranking | Team |
|---|---|
| 1 | Florida (20) |
| 2 | Duke (8) |
| 3 | Illinois (2) |
| 4 | Arizona |
| 5 | UConn |
| 6 | Michigan State |
| 7 | Texas |
| 8 | Houston |
| 9 | Tennessee |
| 10 | Virginia |
| 11 | Louisville |
| 12 | Gonzaga |
| 13 | Arkansas |
| 14 | St. John's |
| 14 | Iowa State |
| 16 | Texas Tech |
| 17 | Miami (FL) |
| 18 | Kansas |
| 18 | Alabama |
| 20 | Michigan |
| 21 | Vanderbilt |
| 22 | USC |
| 23 | Kentucky |
| 24 | Purdue |
| 25 | BYU |

== Top 10 matchups ==
=== Regular season ===
- Nov. 10, 2026
  - No. 5 Michigan State defeated No. 2 Duke, 79–73 (Champions Classic – United Center, Chicago,IL)
- Nov. 17, 2026
  - No. 10 Illinois defeated No. 5 Duke, 99–78 (Cameron Indoor Stadium, Durham, NC)
- Nov. 18, 2026
  - No. 8 Houston defeated No. 1 Florida, 86–76 (Players Era 8 – Michelob Ultra Arena, Las Vegas, NV)

== Regular season ==
=== Early-season tournaments ===
| Names | Dates | Locations | Teams | Champions | Runner-Up | 3rd-place winner |
|---|---|---|---|---|---|---|
| 410 Invitational | November 12 & 14, 2026 | SECU Arena (final round) (Towson, MD) | 4 | Towson | UMBC | Morgan State |
| Players Era Festival – Players Era 8 | November 17–19, 2026 | Michelob Ultra Arena (Las Vegas, NV) | 8 | Houston | Kansas | Florida |
| Bahamas Championship | November 19–20, 2026 | Baha Mar Convention Center (Nassau, Bahamas) | 4 | Seton Hall | NC State | Murray State |
| Paradise Jam | November 20–23, 2026 | Sports and Fitness Center (Charlotte Amalie West, VI) | 8 | TBD | TBD | TBD |
| Sunshine Slam | November 23–24, 2026 | Ocean Center (Daytona Beach, FL) | 8 | TBD | TBD | TBD |
| Coconut Hoops | November 23 & 25, 2026 | Alico Arena (Fort Myers, FL) | 4 | TBD | TBD | TBD |
| Maui Invitational | November 23–25, 2026 | Lahaina Civic Center (Lahaina, HI) | 8 | TBD | TBD | TBD |
| Acrisure Classic | November 24–25, 2026 | Acrisure Arena (Thousand Palms, CA) | 4 | TBD | TBD | TBD |
| Acrisure Holiday Invitational | November 24–25, 2026 | Acrisure Arena (Thousand Palms, CA) | 4 | TBD | TBD | TBD |
| Players Era Festival – Players Era 16 | November 23–26, 2026 | MGM Grand Garden Arena (Las Vegas, NV) | 16 | (Players Era 16 – Bracket 1) (Players Era 16 – Bracket 2) | (Players Era 16 – Bracket 1) (Players Era 16 – Bracket 2) | (Players Era 16 – Bracket 1) (Players Era 16 – Bracket 2) |
| ESPN Events Invitational | November 23–27, 2026 | State Farm Field House (Lake Buena Vista, FL) | 16 | TBD | TBD | TBD |
| Battle 4 Atlantis | November 25–27, 2026 | Imperial Arena (Paradise Island, Bahamas) | 8 | TBD | TBD | TBD |
| Acrisure Holiday Classic | November 26–27, 2026 | Acrisure Arena (Thousand Palms, CA) | 4 | TBD | TBD | TBD |
| Acrisure Invitational | November 26–27, 2026 | Acrisure Arena (Thousand Palms, CA) | 4 | TBD | TBD | TBD |
| Rady Children's Invitational | November 26–27, 2026 | Jenny Craig Pavilion (San Diego, CA) | 4 | TBD | TBD | TBD |
| Emerald Coast Classic | November 27–28, 2026 | Radier Arena (Niceville, FL) | 4 | TBD | TBD | TBD |
| Resorts World Las Vegas Classic | November 27–28, 2026 | Resorts World Event Center (Winchester, Nevada) | 4 | TBD | TBD | TBD |
| Big 5 Classic | November 7–December 5, 2026 | Xfinity Mobile Arena (final rounds) (Philadelphia, PA) | 6 | TBD | TBD | TBD |
| Texas Legends College Classic | December 18–21, 2026 | Comerica Center (Frisco, TX) | 8 | TBD | TBD | TBD |
| Sun Bowl Invitational | December 20–21, 2026 | Don Haskins Center (El Paso, TX) | 4 | TBD | TBD | TBD |

=== Head-to-head conference challenges ===
| Conference matchup | Dates | Conference winner | Conference loser | Record |
|---|---|---|---|---|
| ACC–SEC Challenge | December 1 & 2 | | | – |
| America East–Metro Challenge | November 5–8 | America East | Metro | **10–8** |
| Big Sky–Summit Challenge | November 14 – December 20 | | | **1–0** Big Sky |
| Big South–SoCon Challenge | November 18–22 | | | – |
| MAC–SBC Challenge | November – February | | | – |

=== Upsets ===
An upset is a victory by an underdog team. In the context of NCAA Division I men's basketball, this generally constitutes an unranked team defeating a team currently ranked in the top 25. This list will highlight those upsets of ranked teams by unranked teams as well as upsets of No. 1 teams. Rankings are from the AP poll.

Bold type indicates winning teams in "true road games"–i.e., those played on an opponent's home court (including secondary homes). Italics indicates winning teams in an early-season tournament (or event). Events are tournaments with the same teams every year (including rivalry games).

| Winner | Score | Loser | Date | Tournament/event | Notes |
|---|---|---|---|---|---|
| Memphis | 80–76 | No. 18 Iowa State | November 2, 2026 | | Game played in Sioux Falls, SD |
| **LSU** | 81–80 | No. 14 Gonzaga | November 14, 2026 | Bad Boy Mowers Series | Game played in Spokane, WA |
| Memphis | 98–78 | No. 10 Louisville | November 15, 2026 | Rivalry | |
| Indiana | 81–76 | No. 20 Arkansas | November 17, 2026 | Bad Boy Mowers Series | Game played in New York, NY |
| No. 8 Houston | 86–76 | No. 1 Florida | November 18, 2026 | Players Era 8 | Game played in Las Vegas, NV |
| Villanova | 79–73 | No. 18 Michigan | November 21, 2026 | | |

==== Non-Division I teams over Division I teams ====
In addition to the above-listed upsets in which an unranked team defeated a ranked team,

| Winner | Score | Loser | Date | Tournament/event | Notes |
|---|---|---|---|---|---|
| **Fort Valley State** (Division II) | 75–70 | Florida A&M | November 5, 2026 | | |
| **Georgia Gwinnett** (NAIA) | 79–77 | Alabama State | November 9, 2026 | | |

=== Conference and tournament winners ===
Each of the 32 Division I athletic conferences will end its regular season with a single elimination tournament. The team with the best regular-season record in each conference receives the number one seed in each tournament, with tiebreakers used as needed in the case of ties for the top seeding. Unless otherwise noticed, the winners of these tournaments will receive automatic invitations to the 2027 NCAA Division I men's basketball tournament.

| Conference | Regular season first place | Conference player of the year | Conference coach of the year | Conference tournament | Tournament venue (city) | Tournament winner |
|---|---|---|---|---|---|---|
| America East Conference | | | | 2027 America East Conference men's basketball tournament | Campus Sites | |
| American Conference | | | | 2027 American Conference men's basketball tournament | Yuengling Center (Tampa, FL) | |
| Atlantic 10 Conference | | | | 2027 Atlantic 10 men's basketball tournament | Barclays Center (Brooklyn, NY) | |
| Atlantic Coast Conference | | | | 2027 ACC men's basketball tournament | Greensboro Coliseum (Greensboro, NC) | |
| Atlantic Sun Conference | | | | 2027 Atlantic Sun Conference men's basketball tournament | TBD | |
| Big 12 Conference | | | | 2027 Big 12 men's basketball tournament | T-Mobile Center (Kansas City, MO) | |
| Big East Conference | | | | 2027 Big East Conference men's basketball tournament | Madison Square Garden (New York, NY) | |
| Big Sky Conference | | | | 2027 Big Sky Conference men's basketball tournament | Idaho Central Arena (Boise, ID) | |
| Big South Conference | | | | 2027 Big South Conference men's basketball tournament | Freedom Hall Civic Center (Johnson City, TN) | |
| Big Ten Conference | | | | 2027 Big Ten Conference men's basketball tournament | Gainbridge Fieldhouse (Indianapolis, IN) | |
| Big West Conference | | | | 2027 Big West Conference men's basketball tournament | Lee's Family Forum (Henderson, NV) | |
| Coastal Athletic Association | | | | 2027 CAA men's basketball conference | CareFirst Arena (Washington DC) | |
| Conference USA | | | | 2027 Conference USA men's basketball tournament | Propst Arena (Huntsville, AL) | |
| Horizon League | | | | 2027 Horizon League men's basketball tournament | Quarterfinals: Campus sites Semifinals and final: Riverview Health Arena at Innovation Mile (Noblesville, IN) | |
| Ivy League | | | | 2027 Ivy League men's basketball tournament | Palestra (Philadelphia, PA) | |
| Metro Conference | | | | 2027 Metro Conference men's basketball tournament | Boardwalk Hall (Atlantic City, NJ) | |
| Mid-American Conference | | | | 2027 Mid-American Conference men's basketball tournament | Rocket Arena (Cleveland, OH) | |
| Mid-Eastern Athletic Conference | | | | 2027 MEAC men's basketball tournament | Norfolk Scope (Norfolk, VA) | |
| Missouri Valley Conference | | | | 2027 Missouri Valley Conference men's basketball tournament | Enterprise Center (St. Louis, MO) | |
| Mountain West Conference | | | | 2027 Mountain West Conference men's basketball tournament | Thomas & Mack Center (Paradise, NV) | |
| Northeast Conference | | | | 2027 NEC men's basketball tournament | Campus sites | |
| Ohio Valley Conference | | | | 2027 Ohio Valley Conference men's basketball tournament | Ford Center (Evansville, IN) | |
| Pac-12 Conference | | | | 2027 Pac-12 Conference men's basketball tournament | MGM Grand Garden Arena (Paradise, NV) | |
| Patriot League | | | | 2027 Patriot League men's basketball tournament | TBD | |
| Southeastern Conference | | | | 2027 SEC men's basketball tournament | Bridgestone Arena (Nashville, TN) | |
| Southern Conference | | | | 2027 Southern Conference men's basketball tournament | TBD | |
| Southland Conference | | | | 2027 Southland Conference men's basketball tournament | TBD | |
| Southwestern Athletic Conference | | | | 2027 Southwestern Athletic Conference men's basketball tournament | TBD | |
| Summit League | | | | 2027 Summit League men's basketball tournament | Denny Sanford Premier Center (Sioux Falls, SD) | |
| Sun Belt Conference | | | | 2027 Sun Belt Conference men's basketball tournament | Pensacola Bay Center (Pensacola, FL) | |
| United Athletic Conference | | | | 2027 United Athletic Conference men's basketball tournament | Credit Union of Texas Event Center (Allen, TX) | |
| West Coast Conference | | | | 2027 West Coast Conference men's basketball tournament | Orleans Arena (Paradise, NV) | |

== Conference standings ==
2026–27 America East Conference men's basketball standings
| | Conf. | | | | Overall |
| Team | W | | L | PCT | W | | L | PCT |
|---|---|---|---|---|---|---|---|---|
| UMass Lowell | 0 | – | 0 | – | 4 | – | 1 | .800 |
| Albany | 0 | – | 0 | – | 4 | – | 3 | .571 |
| Binghamton | 0 | – | 0 | – | 4 | – | 3 | .571 |
| New Hampshire | 0 | – | 0 | – | 4 | – | 3 | .571 |
| Vermont | 0 | – | 0 | – | 3 | – | 3 | .500 |
| Bryant | 0 | – | 0 | – | 3 | – | 4 | .429 |
| UMBC | 0 | – | 0 | – | 3 | – | 4 | .429 |
| Maine | 0 | – | 0 | – | 2 | – | 5 | .286 |
| NJIT | 0 | – | 0 | – | 1 | – | 6 | .143 |
† 2027 AmEast tournament winner As of November 22, 2026; Rankings from AP poll

2026–27 American Conference men's basketball standings
| | Conf. | | | | Overall |
| Team | W | | L | PCT | W | | L | PCT |
|---|---|---|---|---|---|---|---|---|
| Wichita State | 0 | – | 0 | – | 5 | – | 1 | .833 |
| Florida Atlantic | 0 | – | 0 | – | 4 | – | 1 | .800 |
| Tulsa | 0 | – | 0 | – | 4 | – | 1 | .800 |
| Memphis | 0 | – | 0 | – | 3 | – | 1 | .750 |
| UAB | 0 | – | 0 | – | 4 | – | 2 | .667 |
| UTSA | 0 | – | 0 | – | 4 | – | 2 | .667 |
| Charlotte | 0 | – | 0 | – | 3 | – | 2 | .600 |
| North Texas | 0 | – | 0 | – | 3 | – | 2 | .600 |
| Rice | 0 | – | 0 | – | 3 | – | 2 | .600 |
| Temple | 0 | – | 0 | – | 3 | – | 2 | .600 |
| East Carolina | 0 | – | 0 | – | 3 | – | 3 | .500 |
| South Florida | 0 | – | 0 | – | 3 | – | 3 | .500 |
| Tulane | 0 | – | 0 | – | 2 | – | 3 | .400 |
† 2027 American tournament winner As of November 22, 2026; Rankings from AP poll

2026–27 Atlantic 10 men's basketball standings
| | Conf. | | | | Overall |
| Team | W | | L | PCT | W | | L | PCT |
|---|---|---|---|---|---|---|---|---|
| Duquesne | 0 | – | 0 | – | 5 | – | 0 | 1.000 |
| George Mason | 0 | – | 0 | – | 5 | – | 1 | .833 |
| George Washington | 0 | – | 0 | – | 5 | – | 1 | .833 |
| Rhode Island | 0 | – | 0 | – | 5 | – | 1 | .833 |
| Saint Joseph's | 0 | – | 0 | – | 5 | – | 1 | .833 |
| Fordham | 0 | – | 0 | – | 5 | – | 1 | .833 |
| St. Bonaventure | 0 | – | 0 | – | 4 | – | 1 | .800 |
| VCU | 0 | – | 0 | – | 3 | – | 1 | .750 |
| Davidson | 0 | – | 0 | – | 3 | – | 2 | .600 |
| Loyola Chicago | 0 | – | 0 | – | 3 | – | 2 | .600 |
| Saint Louis | 0 | – | 0 | – | 3 | – | 2 | .600 |
| Dayton | 0 | – | 0 | – | 3 | – | 3 | .500 |
| Richmond | 0 | – | 0 | – | 3 | – | 3 | .500 |
| La Salle | 0 | – | 0 | – | 2 | – | 4 | .333 |
† 2027 A-10 tournament winner As of November 22, 2026; Rankings from AP poll

2026–27 ACC men's basketball standings
| | Conf. | | | | Overall |
| Team | W | | L | PCT | W | | L | PCT |
|---|---|---|---|---|---|---|---|---|
| No. 4 Virginia | 0 | – | 0 | – | 7 | – | 0 | 1.000 |
| Pittsburgh | 0 | – | 0 | – | 6 | – | 0 | 1.000 |
| SMU | 0 | – | 0 | – | 6 | – | 0 | 1.000 |
| Virginia Tech | 0 | – | 0 | – | 6 | – | 0 | 1.000 |
| Boston College | 0 | – | 0 | – | 5 | – | 0 | 1.000 |
| Notre Dame | 0 | – | 0 | – | 6 | – | 1 | .857 |
| Florida State | 0 | – | 0 | – | 5 | – | 1 | .833 |
| Georgia Tech | 0 | – | 0 | – | 5 | – | 1 | .833 |
| No. 17 Miami (FL) | 0 | – | 0 | – | 5 | – | 1 | .833 |
| NC State | 0 | – | 0 | – | 5 | – | 1 | .833 |
| Stanford | 0 | – | 0 | – | 5 | – | 1 | .833 |
| Wake Forest | 0 | – | 0 | – | 5 | – | 1 | .833 |
| Clemson | 0 | – | 0 | – | 4 | – | 1 | .800 |
| North Carolina | 0 | – | 0 | – | 4 | – | 1 | .800 |
| No. 23 Louisville | 0 | – | 0 | – | 3 | – | 1 | .750 |
| California | 0 | – | 0 | – | 4 | – | 2 | .667 |
| No. 5 Duke | 0 | – | 0 | – | 4 | – | 2 | .667 |
| Syracuse | 0 | – | 0 | – | 4 | – | 2 | .667 |
† 2027 ACC tournament winner As of November 22, 2026; Rankings from AP poll

2026–27 ASUN men's basketball standings
| | Conf. | | | | Overall |
| Team | W | | L | PCT | W | | L | PCT |
|---|---|---|---|---|---|---|---|---|
| North Florida | 0 | – | 0 | – | 3 | – | 3 | .500 |
| Queens | 0 | – | 0 | – | 3 | – | 3 | .500 |
| West Florida* | 0 | – | 0 | – | 3 | – | 3 | .500 |
| Lipscomb | 0 | – | 0 | – | 3 | – | 4 | .429 |
| Florida Gulf Coast | 0 | – | 0 | – | 2 | – | 4 | .333 |
| Jacksonville | 0 | – | 0 | – | 2 | – | 4 | .333 |
| Bellarmine | 0 | – | 0 | – | 2 | – | 5 | .286 |
| Stetson | 0 | – | 0 | – | 1 | – | 5 | .167 |
† 2027 ASUN tournament winner * ineligible for the 2027 NCAA tournament due to transition from Division II; As of November 22, 2026; Rankings from AP poll

2026–27 Big 12 men's basketball standings
| | Conf. | | | | Overall |
| Team | W | | L | PCT | W | | L | PCT |
|---|---|---|---|---|---|---|---|---|
| No. 8 Houston | 0 | – | 0 | – | 6 | – | 0 | 1.000 |
| Arizona State | 0 | – | 0 | – | 5 | – | 0 | 1.000 |
| No. 21 BYU | 0 | – | 0 | – | 5 | – | 0 | 1.000 |
| No. 9 Texas Tech | 0 | – | 0 | – | 5 | – | 0 | 1.000 |
| No. 11 Kansas | 0 | – | 0 | – | 5 | – | 1 | .833 |
| No. 12 Arizona | 0 | – | 0 | – | 4 | – | 1 | .800 |
| Baylor | 0 | – | 0 | – | 4 | – | 1 | .800 |
| Cincinnati | 0 | – | 0 | – | 4 | – | 1 | .800 |
| TCU | 0 | – | 0 | – | 4 | – | 1 | .800 |
| Iowa State | 0 | – | 0 | – | 3 | – | 1 | .750 |
| West Virginia | 0 | – | 0 | – | 4 | – | 2 | .667 |
| UCF | 0 | – | 0 | – | 4 | – | 2 | .667 |
| Kansas State | 0 | – | 0 | – | 3 | – | 2 | .600 |
| Oklahoma State | 0 | – | 0 | – | 3 | – | 2 | .600 |
| Utah | 0 | – | 0 | – | 3 | – | 2 | .600 |
| Colorado | 0 | – | 0 | – | 2 | – | 3 | .400 |
† 2027 Big 12 tournament winner As of November 22, 2026; Rankings from AP poll

2026–27 Big East men's basketball standings
| | Conf. | | | | Overall |
| Team | W | | L | PCT | W | | L | PCT |
|---|---|---|---|---|---|---|---|---|
| Georgetown | 0 | – | 0 | – | 6 | – | 0 | 1.000 |
| DePaul | 0 | – | 0 | – | 5 | – | 0 | 1.000 |
| No. 13 St. John's | 0 | – | 0 | – | 5 | – | 0 | 1.000 |
| Seton Hall | 0 | – | 0 | – | 5 | – | 1 | .833 |
| Xavier | 0 | – | 0 | – | 5 | – | 1 | .833 |
| Creighton | 0 | – | 0 | – | 4 | – | 1 | .800 |
| Providence | 0 | – | 0 | – | 4 | – | 1 | .800 |
| No. 3 UConn | 0 | – | 0 | – | 4 | – | 1 | .800 |
| Butler | 0 | – | 0 | – | 4 | – | 2 | .667 |
| Villanova | 0 | – | 0 | – | 4 | – | 2 | .667 |
| Marquette | 0 | – | 0 | – | 3 | – | 2 | .600 |
† 2027 Big East tournament winner As of November 22, 2026; Rankings from AP poll

2026–27 Big Sky men's basketball standings
| | Conf. | | | | Overall |
| Team | W | | L | PCT | W | | L | PCT |
|---|---|---|---|---|---|---|---|---|
| Northern Colorado | 0 | – | 0 | – | 3 | – | 3 | .500 |
| Portland State | 0 | – | 0 | – | 3 | – | 3 | .500 |
| Southern Utah | 0 | – | 0 | – | 3 | – | 3 | .500 |
| Eastern Washington | 0 | – | 0 | – | 2 | – | 3 | .400 |
| Idaho | 0 | – | 0 | – | 2 | – | 3 | .400 |
| Montana | 0 | – | 0 | – | 2 | – | 3 | .400 |
| Montana State | 0 | – | 0 | – | 2 | – | 4 | .333 |
| Idaho State | 0 | – | 0 | – | 1 | – | 4 | .200 |
| Utah Tech | 0 | – | 0 | – | 1 | – | 4 | .200 |
| Weber State | 0 | – | 0 | – | 1 | – | 4 | .200 |
| Northern Arizona | 0 | – | 0 | – | 1 | – | 5 | .167 |
† 2027 Big Sky tournament winner As of November 22, 2026; Rankings from AP poll

2026–27 Big South men's basketball standings
| | Conf. | | | | Overall |
| Team | W | | L | PCT | W | | L | PCT |
|---|---|---|---|---|---|---|---|---|
| High Point | 0 | – | 0 | – | 6 | – | 0 | 1.000 |
| Longwood | 0 | – | 0 | – | 4 | – | 3 | .571 |
| Charleston Southern | 0 | – | 0 | – | 2 | – | 4 | .333 |
| Radford | 0 | – | 0 | – | 2 | – | 4 | .333 |
| UNC Asheville | 0 | – | 0 | – | 2 | – | 4 | .333 |
| Presbyterian | 0 | – | 0 | – | 1 | – | 4 | .200 |
| Gardner–Webb | 0 | – | 0 | – | 1 | – | 5 | .167 |
| USC Upstate | 0 | – | 0 | – | 1 | – | 6 | .143 |
| Winthrop | 0 | – | 0 | – | 0 | – | 6 | .000 |
† 2027 Big South tournament winner As of November 22, 2026; Rankings from AP poll

2026–27 Big Ten Conference men's basketball standings
| | Conf. | | | | Overall |
| Team | W | | L | PCT | W | | L | PCT |
|---|---|---|---|---|---|---|---|---|
| Indiana | 0 | – | 0 | – | 6 | – | 0 | 1.000 |
| Minnesota | 0 | – | 0 | – | 6 | – | 0 | 1.000 |
| No. 24 Nebraska | 0 | – | 0 | – | 5 | – | 0 | 1.000 |
| No. 7 UCLA | 0 | – | 0 | – | 5 | – | 0 | 1.000 |
| No. 18т USC | 0 | – | 0 | – | 5 | – | 0 | 1.000 |
| Washington | 0 | – | 0 | – | 4 | – | 0 | 1.000 |
| No. 10 Illinois | 0 | – | 0 | – | 5 | – | 1 | .833 |
| No. 2 Michigan State | 0 | – | 0 | – | 5 | – | 1 | .833 |
| Penn State | 0 | – | 0 | – | 5 | – | 1 | .833 |
| Oregon | 0 | – | 0 | – | 3 | – | 1 | .750 |
| Ohio State | 0 | – | 0 | – | 4 | – | 2 | .667 |
| Purdue | 0 | – | 0 | – | 4 | – | 2 | .667 |
| Rutgers | 0 | – | 0 | – | 4 | – | 2 | .667 |
| Wisconsin | 0 | – | 0 | – | 4 | – | 2 | .667 |
| Iowa | 0 | – | 0 | – | 3 | – | 2 | .600 |
| Maryland | 0 | – | 0 | – | 3 | – | 2 | .600 |
| No. 18т Michigan | 0 | – | 0 | – | 3 | – | 2 | .600 |
| Northwestern | 0 | – | 0 | – | 3 | – | 3 | .500 |
† 2027 Big Ten tournament winner As of November 22, 2026; Rankings from AP poll

2026–27 Big West men's basketball standings
| | Conf. | | | | Overall |
| Team | W | | L | PCT | W | | L | PCT |
|---|---|---|---|---|---|---|---|---|
| UC Santa Barbara | 0 | – | 0 | – | 5 | – | 0 | 1.000 |
| Utah Valley | 0 | – | 0 | – | 4 | – | 0 | 1.000 |
| Cal State Bakersfield | 0 | – | 0 | – | 4 | – | 1 | .800 |
| UC San Diego | 0 | – | 0 | – | 3 | – | 1 | .750 |
| UC Irvine | 0 | – | 0 | – | 3 | – | 2 | .600 |
| UC Riverside | 0 | – | 0 | – | 3 | – | 2 | .600 |
| Cal Poly | 0 | – | 0 | – | 3 | – | 3 | .500 |
| Cal State Fullerton | 0 | – | 0 | – | 2 | – | 2 | .500 |
| Sacramento State | 0 | – | 0 | – | 1 | – | 3 | .250 |
| Long Beach State | 0 | – | 0 | – | 1 | – | 3 | .250 |
| Cal State Northridge | 0 | – | 0 | – | 1 | – | 4 | .200 |
| California Baptist | 0 | – | 0 | – | 1 | – | 5 | .167 |
† 2027 Big West tournament winner As of November 22, 2026; Rankings from AP poll

2026–27 CAA men's basketball standings
| | Conf. | | | | Overall |
| Team | W | | L | PCT | W | | L | PCT |
|---|---|---|---|---|---|---|---|---|
| Charleston | 0 | – | 0 | – | 4 | – | 1 | .800 |
| UNC Wilmington | 0 | – | 0 | – | 5 | – | 1 | .833 |
| William & Mary | 0 | – | 0 | – | 4 | – | 2 | .667 |
| Drexel | 0 | – | 0 | – | 3 | – | 2 | .600 |
| North Carolina A&T | 0 | – | 0 | – | 3 | – | 2 | .600 |
| Stony Brook | 0 | – | 0 | – | 3 | – | 2 | .600 |
| Elon | 0 | – | 0 | – | 3 | – | 3 | .500 |
| Towson | 0 | – | 0 | – | 3 | – | 3 | .500 |
| Hofstra | 0 | – | 0 | – | 2 | – | 3 | .400 |
| Campbell | 0 | – | 0 | – | 2 | – | 4 | .333 |
| Northeastern | 0 | – | 0 | – | 2 | – | 4 | .333 |
| Hampton | 0 | – | 0 | – | 1 | – | 3 | .250 |
| Monmouth | 0 | – | 0 | – | 1 | – | 4 | .200 |
† 2027 CAA tournament winner As of November 22, 2026; Rankings from AP poll

2026–27 Conference USA men's basketball standings
| | Conf. | | | | Overall |
| Team | W | | L | PCT | W | | L | PCT |
|---|---|---|---|---|---|---|---|---|
| Missouri State | 0 | – | 0 | – | 5 | – | 0 | 1.000 |
| Kennesaw State | 0 | – | 0 | – | 5 | – | 1 | .833 |
| Liberty | 0 | – | 0 | – | 4 | – | 1 | .800 |
| FIU | 0 | – | 0 | – | 3 | – | 1 | .750 |
| Middle Tennessee | 0 | – | 0 | – | 5 | – | 2 | .714 |
| Delaware | 0 | – | 0 | – | 4 | – | 2 | .667 |
| Western Kentucky | 0 | – | 0 | – | 4 | – | 2 | .667 |
| Jacksonville State | 0 | – | 0 | – | 3 | – | 3 | .500 |
| Sam Houston | 0 | – | 0 | – | 3 | – | 3 | .500 |
| New Mexico State | 0 | – | 0 | – | 1 | – | 4 | .200 |
† 2027 CUSA tournament winner As of November 22, 2026; Rankings from AP poll

2026–27 Horizon League men's basketball standings
| | Conf. | | | | Overall |
| Team | W | | L | PCT | W | | L | PCT |
|---|---|---|---|---|---|---|---|---|
| Wright State | 0 | – | 0 | – | 5 | – | 0 | 1.000 |
| IU Indy | 0 | – | 0 | – | 3 | – | 2 | .600 |
| Purdue Fort Wayne | 0 | – | 0 | – | 4 | – | 2 | .667 |
| Northern Illinois | 0 | – | 0 | – | 4 | – | 3 | .571 |
| Northern Kentucky | 0 | – | 0 | – | 3 | – | 3 | .500 |
| Cleveland State | 0 | – | 0 | – | 3 | – | 4 | .429 |
| Green Bay | 0 | – | 0 | – | 3 | – | 4 | .429 |
| Youngstown State | 0 | – | 0 | – | 2 | – | 3 | .400 |
| Milwaukee | 0 | – | 0 | – | 2 | – | 4 | .333 |
| Robert Morris | 0 | – | 0 | – | 1 | – | 4 | .200 |
| Oakland | 0 | – | 0 | – | 1 | – | 7 | .125 |
| Detroit Mercy* | 0 | – | 0 | – | 0 | – | 5 | .000 |
† 2027 Horizon League tournament winner * Ineligible for both the 2027 NCAA Tournament and Horizon tournament due to APR penalties. As of November 22, 2026; Rankings from AP poll

2026–27 Ivy League men's basketball standings
| | Conf. | | | | Overall |
| Team | W | | L | PCT | W | | L | PCT |
|---|---|---|---|---|---|---|---|---|
| Columbia | 0 | – | 0 | – | 5 | – | 1 | .833 |
| Dartmouth | 0 | – | 0 | – | 4 | – | 2 | .667 |
| Princeton | 0 | – | 0 | – | 4 | – | 2 | .667 |
| Cornell | 0 | – | 0 | – | 3 | – | 3 | .500 |
| Penn | 0 | – | 0 | – | 3 | – | 3 | .500 |
| Yale | 0 | – | 0 | – | 3 | – | 3 | .500 |
| Harvard | 0 | – | 0 | – | 3 | – | 4 | .429 |
| Brown | 0 | – | 0 | – | 2 | – | 5 | .286 |
† 2027 Ivy League tournament winner As of November 22, 2026; Rankings from AP poll

2026–27 Metro Conference men's basketball standings
| | Conf. | | | | Overall |
| Team | W | | L | PCT | W | | L | PCT |
|---|---|---|---|---|---|---|---|---|
| Siena | 0 | – | 0 | – | 4 | – | 2 | .667 |
| Fairfield | 0 | – | 0 | – | 3 | – | 2 | .600 |
| Canisius | 0 | – | 0 | – | 4 | – | 3 | .571 |
| Iona | 0 | – | 0 | – | 3 | – | 4 | .429 |
| Marist | 0 | – | 0 | – | 2 | – | 3 | .400 |
| Sacred Heart | 0 | – | 0 | – | 2 | – | 3 | .400 |
| Quinnipiac | 0 | – | 0 | – | 2 | – | 4 | .333 |
| Rider | 0 | – | 0 | – | 2 | – | 5 | .286 |
| Merrimack | 0 | – | 0 | – | 1 | – | 4 | .200 |
| Mount St. Mary's | 0 | – | 0 | – | 1 | – | 4 | .200 |
| Niagara | 0 | – | 0 | – | 1 | – | 4 | .200 |
| Manhattan | 0 | – | 0 | – | 1 | – | 5 | .167 |
| Saint Peter's | 0 | – | 0 | – | 0 | – | 6 | .000 |
† 2027 Metro tournament winner As of November 22, 2026; Rankings from AP poll

2026–27 Mid-American Conference men's basketball standings
| | Conf. | | | | Overall |
| Team | W | | L | PCT | W | | L | PCT |
|---|---|---|---|---|---|---|---|---|
| Miami (OH) | 0 | – | 0 | – | 4 | – | 0 | 1.000 |
| Western Michigan | 0 | – | 0 | – | 5 | – | 1 | .833 |
| Akron | 0 | – | 0 | – | 4 | – | 1 | .800 |
| Eastern Michigan | 0 | – | 0 | – | 4 | – | 1 | .800 |
| Ohio | 0 | – | 0 | – | 3 | – | 1 | .750 |
| Central Michigan | 0 | – | 0 | – | 4 | – | 2 | .667 |
| Bowling Green | 0 | – | 0 | – | 3 | – | 2 | .600 |
| UMass | 0 | – | 0 | – | 3 | – | 2 | .600 |
| Toledo | 0 | – | 0 | – | 3 | – | 3 | .500 |
| Buffalo | 0 | – | 0 | – | 2 | – | 3 | .400 |
| Kent State | 0 | – | 0 | – | 2 | – | 3 | .400 |
| Ball State | 0 | – | 0 | – | 1 | – | 4 | .200 |
† 2027 MAC tournament winner As of November 22, 2026; Rankings from AP poll

2026–27 MEAC men's basketball standings
| | Conf. | | | | Overall |
| Team | W | | L | PCT | W | | L | PCT |
|---|---|---|---|---|---|---|---|---|
| Morgan State | 0 | – | 0 | – | 4 | – | 3 | .571 |
| Howard | 0 | – | 0 | – | 3 | – | 3 | .500 |
| South Carolina State | 0 | – | 0 | – | 3 | – | 3 | .500 |
| Delaware State | 0 | – | 0 | – | 2 | – | 4 | .333 |
| Maryland Eastern Shore | 0 | – | 0 | – | 2 | – | 5 | .286 |
| Norfolk State | 0 | – | 0 | – | 2 | – | 5 | .286 |
| North Carolina Central | 0 | – | 0 | – | 1 | – | 5 | .167 |
| Coppin State | 0 | – | 0 | – | 1 | – | 6 | .143 |
† 2027 MEAC tournament winner As of November 22, 2026; Rankings from AP poll

2026–27 Missouri Valley Conference men's basketball standings
| | Conf. | | | | Overall |
| Team | W | | L | PCT | W | | L | PCT |
|---|---|---|---|---|---|---|---|---|
| Murray State | 0 | – | 0 | – | 6 | – | 1 | .857 |
| Belmont | 0 | – | 0 | – | 4 | – | 1 | .800 |
| UIC | 0 | – | 0 | – | 4 | – | 1 | .800 |
| Valparaiso | 0 | – | 0 | – | 4 | – | 1 | .800 |
| Drake | 0 | – | 0 | – | 4 | – | 2 | .667 |
| Evansville | 0 | – | 0 | – | 3 | – | 2 | .600 |
| Illinois State | 0 | – | 0 | – | 3 | – | 3 | .500 |
| Northern Iowa | 0 | – | 0 | – | 3 | – | 3 | .500 |
| Southern Illinois | 0 | – | 0 | – | 3 | – | 3 | .500 |
| Bradley | 0 | – | 0 | – | 3 | – | 4 | .429 |
| Indiana State | 0 | – | 0 | – | 2 | – | 4 | .333 |
† 2027 MVC tournament winner As of November 22, 2026; Rankings from AP poll

2026–27 Mountain West Conference men's basketball standings
| | Conf. | | | | Overall |
| Team | W | | L | PCT | W | | L | PCT |
|---|---|---|---|---|---|---|---|---|
| Grand Canyon | 0 | – | 0 | – | 4 | – | 0 | 1.000 |
| UTEP | 0 | – | 0 | – | 4 | – | 1 | .800 |
| Wyoming | 0 | – | 0 | – | 4 | – | 1 | .800 |
| Hawaii | 0 | – | 0 | – | 3 | – | 2 | .600 |
| Nevada | 0 | – | 0 | – | 3 | – | 2 | .600 |
| New Mexico | 0 | – | 0 | – | 3 | – | 2 | .600 |
| San Jose State | 0 | – | 0 | – | 3 | – | 2 | .600 |
| UC Davis | 0 | – | 0 | – | 3 | – | 2 | .600 |
| Air Force | 0 | – | 0 | – | 3 | – | 3 | .500 |
| UNLV | 0 | – | 0 | – | 3 | – | 3 | .500 |
† 2027 Mountain West tournament winner As of November 22, 2026; Rankings from AP poll

2026–27 NEC men's basketball standings
| | Conf. | | | | Overall |
| Team | W | | L | PCT | W | | L | PCT |
|---|---|---|---|---|---|---|---|---|
| Central Connecticut | 0 | – | 0 | – | 4 | – | 2 | .667 |
| Fairleigh Dickinson | 0 | – | 0 | – | 3 | – | 3 | .500 |
| New Haven * | 0 | – | 0 | – | 3 | – | 3 | .500 |
| Le Moyne | 0 | – | 0 | – | 2 | – | 4 | .333 |
| Stonehill | 0 | – | 0 | – | 2 | – | 4 | .333 |
| Chicago State | 0 | – | 0 | – | 2 | – | 5 | .286 |
| Mercyhurst * | 0 | – | 0 | – | 2 | – | 5 | .286 |
| Wagner | 0 | – | 0 | – | 1 | – | 5 | .167 |
| LIU | 0 | – | 0 | – | 1 | – | 6 | .143 |
† 2027 NEC tournament winner * ineligible for the 2027 NCAA tournament due to transition from Division II; As of November 22, 2026

2026–27 Ohio Valley Conference men's basketball standings
| | Conf. | | | | Overall |
| Team | W | | L | PCT | W | | L | PCT |
|---|---|---|---|---|---|---|---|---|
| UT Martin | 0 | – | 0 | – | 4 | – | 2 | .667 |
| Southeast Missouri State | 0 | – | 0 | – | 3 | – | 3 | .500 |
| Morehead State | 0 | – | 0 | – | 3 | – | 4 | .429 |
| SIU Edwardsville | 0 | – | 0 | – | 3 | – | 4 | .429 |
| Tennessee State | 0 | – | 0 | – | 2 | – | 3 | .400 |
| Lindenwood | 0 | – | 0 | – | 2 | – | 4 | .333 |
| Southern Indiana | 0 | – | 0 | – | 2 | – | 4 | .333 |
| Eastern Illinois | 0 | – | 0 | – | 1 | – | 6 | .143 |
| Western Illinois | 0 | – | 0 | – | 1 | – | 6 | .143 |
† 2027 OVC tournament winner As of November 22, 2026; Rankings from AP poll

2026–27 Pac-12 Conference men's basketball standings
| | Conf. | | | | Overall |
| Team | W | | L | PCT | W | | L | PCT |
|---|---|---|---|---|---|---|---|---|
| Oregon State | 0 | – | 0 | – | 6 | – | 0 | 1.000 |
| Texas State | 0 | – | 0 | – | 6 | – | 0 | 1.000 |
| San Diego State | 0 | – | 0 | – | 5 | – | 0 | 1.000 |
| Utah State | 0 | – | 0 | – | 5 | – | 0 | 1.000 |
| Colorado State | 0 | – | 0 | – | 4 | – | 1 | .800 |
| No. 22 Gonzaga | 0 | – | 0 | – | 3 | – | 1 | .750 |
| Fresno State | 0 | – | 0 | – | 4 | – | 2 | .667 |
| Boise State | 0 | – | 0 | – | 3 | – | 2 | .600 |
| Washington State | 0 | – | 0 | – | 2 | – | 4 | .333 |
† 2027 Pac-12 Tournament winner As of November 22, 2026; Rankings from AP poll

2026–27 Patriot League men's basketball standings
| | Conf. | | | | Overall |
| Team | W | | L | PCT | W | | L | PCT |
|---|---|---|---|---|---|---|---|---|
| Boston University | 0 | – | 0 | – | 5 | – | 2 | .714 |
| Lehigh | 0 | – | 0 | – | 4 | – | 2 | .667 |
| American | 0 | – | 0 | – | 3 | – | 2 | .600 |
| Navy | 0 | – | 0 | – | 4 | – | 3 | .571 |
| Lafayette | 0 | – | 0 | – | 3 | – | 4 | .429 |
| Army | 0 | – | 0 | – | 2 | – | 4 | .333 |
| Colgate | 0 | – | 0 | – | 2 | – | 4 | .333 |
| Bucknell | 0 | – | 0 | – | 1 | – | 5 | .167 |
| Loyola | 0 | – | 0 | – | 1 | – | 5 | .167 |
| Holy Cross | 0 | – | 0 | – | 0 | – | 6 | .000 |
† 2027 Patriot League tournament winner As of November 22, 2026; Rankings from AP poll

2026–27 Southeastern Conference men's basketball standings
| | Conf. | | | | Overall |
| Team | W | | L | PCT | W | | L | PCT |
|---|---|---|---|---|---|---|---|---|
| Georgia | 0 | – | 0 | – | 6 | – | 0 | 1.000 |
| No. 25 LSU | 0 | – | 0 | – | 6 | – | 0 | 1.000 |
| Texas A&M | 0 | – | 0 | – | 6 | – | 0 | 1.000 |
| No. 15 Vanderbilt | 0 | – | 0 | – | 6 | – | 0 | 1.000 |
| No. 16 Alabama | 0 | – | 0 | – | 5 | – | 0 | 1.000 |
| South Carolina | 0 | – | 0 | – | 5 | – | 0 | 1.000 |
| No. 14 Tennessee | 0 | – | 0 | – | 5 | – | 0 | 1.000 |
| No. 6 Texas | 0 | – | 0 | – | 5 | – | 0 | 1.000 |
| Ole Miss | 0 | – | 0 | – | 4 | – | 0 | 1.000 |
| No. 1 Florida | 0 | – | 0 | – | 6 | – | 1 | .857 |
| Mississippi State | 0 | – | 0 | – | 5 | – | 1 | .833 |
| Missouri | 0 | – | 0 | – | 5 | – | 1 | .833 |
| Oklahoma | 0 | – | 0 | – | 4 | – | 1 | .800 |
| No. 20 Arkansas | 0 | – | 0 | – | 4 | – | 2 | .667 |
| Kentucky | 0 | – | 0 | – | 4 | – | 2 | .667 |
| Auburn | 0 | – | 0 | – | 3 | – | 3 | .500 |
† 2027 SEC tournament winner As of November 22, 2026; Rankings from AP poll

2026–27 Southern Conference men's basketball standings
| | Conf. | | | | Overall |
| Team | W | | L | PCT | W | | L | PCT |
|---|---|---|---|---|---|---|---|---|
| Furman | 0 | – | 0 | – | 6 | – | 1 | .857 |
| Tennessee Tech | 0 | – | 0 | – | 5 | – | 2 | .714 |
| The Citadel | 0 | – | 0 | – | 4 | – | 2 | .667 |
| UNC Greensboro | 0 | – | 0 | – | 4 | – | 2 | .667 |
| VMI | 0 | – | 0 | – | 4 | – | 3 | .571 |
| Wofford | 0 | – | 0 | – | 4 | – | 3 | .571 |
| Chattanooga | 0 | – | 0 | – | 3 | – | 3 | .500 |
| Samford | 0 | – | 0 | – | 2 | – | 2 | .500 |
| Mercer | 0 | – | 0 | – | 3 | – | 4 | .429 |
| East Tennessee State | 0 | – | 0 | – | 2 | – | 3 | .400 |
| Western Carolina | 0 | – | 0 | – | 2 | – | 4 | .333 |
† 2027 SoCon tournament winner As of November 22, 2026; Rankings from AP poll

2026–27 Southland Conference men's basketball standings
| | Conf. | | | | Overall |
| Team | W | | L | PCT | W | | L | PCT |
|---|---|---|---|---|---|---|---|---|
| Houston Christian | 0 | – | 0 | – | 4 | – | 1 | .800 |
| Stephen F. Austin | 0 | – | 0 | – | 4 | – | 1 | .800 |
| Lamar | 0 | – | 0 | – | 3 | – | 1 | .750 |
| UT Rio Grande Valley | 0 | – | 0 | – | 4 | – | 2 | .667 |
| McNeese | 0 | – | 0 | – | 2 | – | 1 | .667 |
| LSU New Orleans | 0 | – | 0 | – | 3 | – | 2 | .600 |
| East Texas A&M | 0 | – | 0 | – | 3 | – | 3 | .500 |
| Nicholls | 0 | – | 0 | – | 2 | – | 4 | .333 |
| Texas A&M–Corpus Christi | 0 | – | 0 | – | 2 | – | 4 | .333 |
| Southeastern Louisiana | 0 | – | 0 | – | 1 | – | 4 | .200 |
| Incarnate Word | 0 | – | 0 | – | 1 | – | 5 | .167 |
| Northwestern State | 0 | – | 0 | – | 1 | – | 5 | .167 |
† 2027 Southland tournament winner As of November 22, 2026; Rankings from AP poll

2026–27 SWAC men's basketball standings
| | Conf. | | | | Overall |
| Team | W | | L | PCT | W | | L | PCT |
|---|---|---|---|---|---|---|---|---|
| Alabama A&M* | 0 | – | 0 | – | 4 | – | 2 | .667 |
| Alabama State | 0 | – | 0 | – | 2 | – | 4 | .333 |
| Jackson State | 0 | – | 0 | – | 2 | – | 4 | .333 |
| Prairie View A&M | 0 | – | 0 | – | 2 | – | 4 | .333 |
| Grambling State | 0 | – | 0 | – | 1 | – | 3 | .250 |
| Bethune–Cookman | 0 | – | 0 | – | 1 | – | 5 | .167 |
| Southern | 0 | – | 0 | – | 1 | – | 5 | .167 |
| Texas Southern | 0 | – | 0 | – | 1 | – | 6 | .143 |
| Mississippi Valley State | 0 | – | 0 | – | 0 | – | 5 | .000 |
| Alcorn State | 0 | – | 0 | – | 0 | – | 6 | .000 |
| Arkansas–Pine Bluff | 0 | – | 0 | – | 0 | – | 6 | .000 |
| Florida A&M | 0 | – | 0 | – | 0 | – | 6 | .000 |
† 2027 SWAC tournament winner * Ineligible for both the 2027 NCAA Tournament and SWAC tournament due to APR penalties. As of November 22, 2026; Rankings from AP poll

2026–27 Summit League men's basketball standings
| | Conf. | | | | Overall |
| Team | W | | L | PCT | W | | L | PCT |
|---|---|---|---|---|---|---|---|---|
| South Dakota State | 0 | – | 0 | – | 5 | – | 1 | .833 |
| St. Thomas | 0 | – | 0 | – | 5 | – | 3 | .625 |
| North Dakota | 0 | – | 0 | – | 3 | – | 3 | .500 |
| Omaha | 0 | – | 0 | – | 3 | – | 3 | .500 |
| Oral Roberts | 0 | – | 0 | – | 3 | – | 3 | .500 |
| Kansas City | 0 | – | 0 | – | 3 | – | 4 | .429 |
| North Dakota State | 0 | – | 0 | – | 2 | – | 5 | .286 |
| South Dakota | 0 | – | 0 | – | 2 | – | 5 | .286 |
† 2027 Summit League tournament winner As of November 22, 2026; Rankings from AP poll

2026–27 Sun Belt Conference men's basketball standings
| | Conf. | | | | Overall |
| Team | W | | L | PCT | W | | L | PCT |
|---|---|---|---|---|---|---|---|---|
| Old Dominion | 0 | – | 0 | – | 5 | – | 1 | .833 |
| Appalachian State | 0 | – | 0 | – | 4 | – | 1 | .800 |
| Arkansas State | 0 | – | 0 | – | 3 | – | 2 | .600 |
| James Madison | 0 | – | 0 | – | 4 | – | 2 | .667 |
| Louisiana Tech | 0 | – | 0 | – | 4 | – | 2 | .667 |
| Southern Miss | 0 | – | 0 | – | 4 | – | 3 | .571 |
| South Alabama | 0 | – | 0 | – | 3 | – | 4 | .429 |
| Coastal Carolina | 0 | – | 0 | – | 2 | – | 4 | .333 |
| Georgia Southern | 0 | – | 0 | – | 2 | – | 4 | .333 |
| Georgia State | 0 | – | 0 | – | 2 | – | 4 | .333 |
| Marshall | 0 | – | 0 | – | 2 | – | 4 | .333 |
| Troy | 0 | – | 0 | – | 2 | – | 4 | .333 |
| Louisiana–Monroe | 0 | – | 0 | – | 2 | – | 6 | .250 |
| Louisiana | 0 | – | 0 | – | 1 | – | 3 | .250 |
† 2027 Sun Belt tournament winner As of November 22, 2026; Rankings from AP poll

2026–27 United Athletic Conference men's basketball standings
| | Conf. | | | | Overall |
| Team | W | | L | PCT | W | | L | PCT |
|---|---|---|---|---|---|---|---|---|
| UT Arlington | 0 | – | 0 | – | 6 | – | 1 | .857 |
| Eastern Kentucky | 0 | – | 0 | – | 4 | – | 2 | .667 |
| North Alabama | 0 | – | 0 | – | 4 | – | 2 | .667 |
| Tarleton State | 0 | – | 0 | – | 4 | – | 2 | .667 |
| Abilene Christian | 0 | – | 0 | – | 3 | – | 3 | .500 |
| Austin Peay | 0 | – | 0 | – | 3 | – | 3 | .500 |
| Central Arkansas | 0 | – | 0 | – | 3 | – | 3 | .500 |
| Little Rock | 0 | – | 0 | – | 2 | – | 4 | .333 |
| West Georgia* | 0 | – | 0 | – | 2 | – | 4 | .333 |
† 2027 UAC tournament winner * ineligible for the 2027 NCAA tournament due to transition from Division II; As of November 22, 2026

2026–27 West Coast Conference men's basketball standings
| | Conf. | | | | Overall |
| Team | W | | L | PCT | W | | L | PCT |
|---|---|---|---|---|---|---|---|---|
| Pacific | 0 | – | 0 | – | 5 | – | 1 | .833 |
| Saint Mary's | 0 | – | 0 | – | 5 | – | 1 | .833 |
| San Diego | 0 | – | 0 | – | 5 | – | 1 | .833 |
| Santa Clara | 0 | – | 0 | – | 5 | – | 1 | .833 |
| San Francisco | 0 | – | 0 | – | 4 | – | 1 | .800 |
| Seattle | 0 | – | 0 | – | 3 | – | 2 | .600 |
| Portland | 0 | – | 0 | – | 4 | – | 3 | .571 |
| Pepperdine | 0 | – | 0 | – | 3 | – | 3 | .500 |
| Loyola Marymount | 0 | – | 0 | – | 3 | – | 3 | .500 |
| Denver | 0 | – | 0 | – | 1 | – | 4 | .200 |
† 2027 WCC tournament winner As of November 22, 2026; Rankings from AP poll

== Postseason tournament ==
The NCAA Tournament will tip off on March 16, 2027, with the Opening Round in Dayton, Ohio and Wichita, Kansas, and will conclude on April 5 at Ford Field in Detroit, Michigan. A total of 76 teams will enter the tournament. 32 of those teams will earn automatic bids by winning their respective conferences tournaments. The remaining 44 teams will be granted "at-large" bids which were extended by the NCAA Selection Committee.

=== Final Four - Ford Field in Detroit, Michigan ===
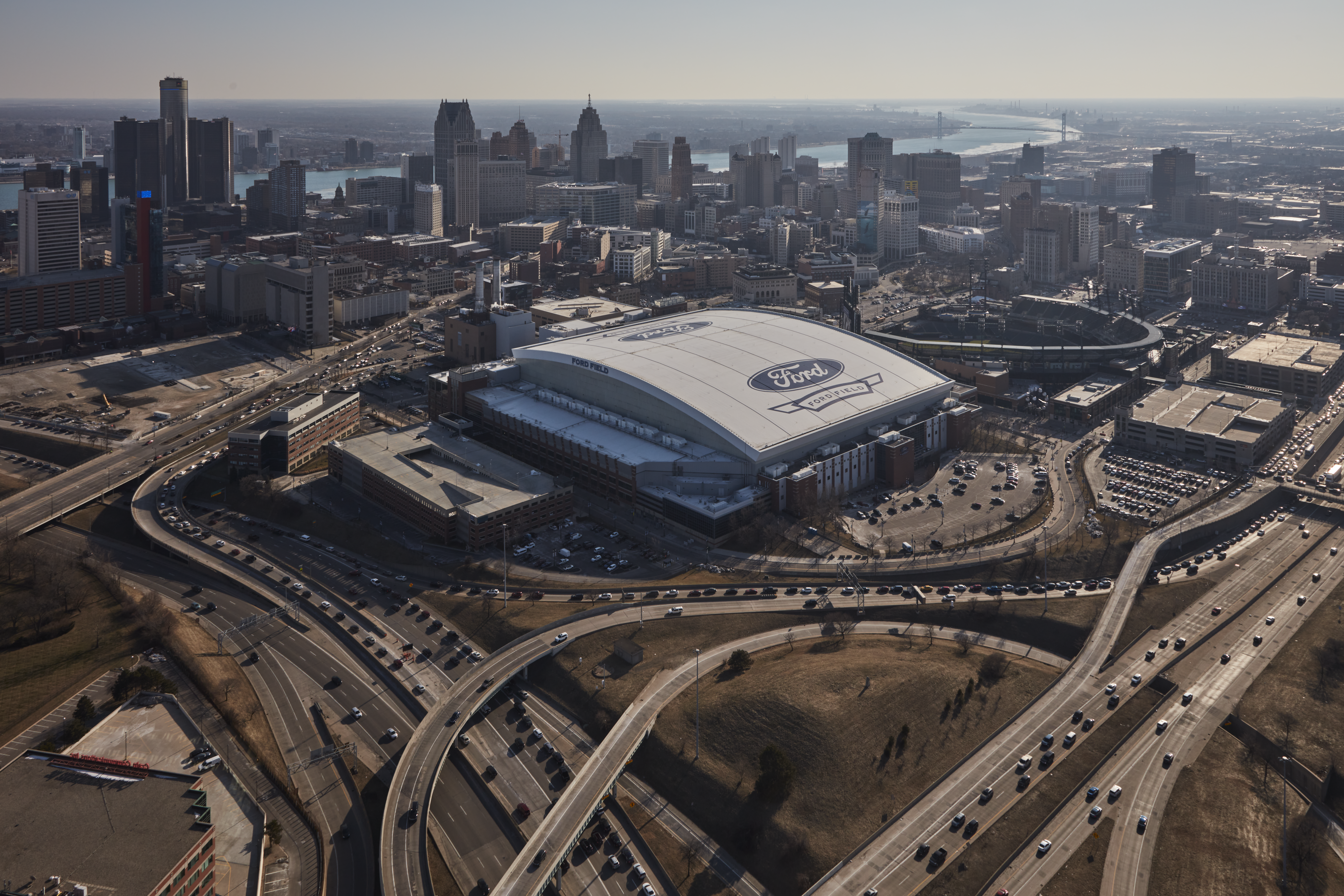
Ford Field in Detroit, Michigan will host the men's Final Four.

Semifinals
1
4
3
2

Finals

=== Tournament upsets ===
Per the NCAA, an upset occurs when the losing team in an NCAA tournament game was seeded at least two seed lines better than the winning team.

=== National Invitation Tournament ===
Once the NCAA tournament field is announced, the National Invitation Tournament will invite 32 teams to participate The first three rounds will be played on campus sites, with the semifinals and final taking place at a site to be determined

==== Semifinals and finals ====
2027 National Invitational Tournament

=== College Basketball Invitational ===
Once the NCAA tournament field is announced, the College Basketball Invitational will invite a number of teams to participate in the event, which will take place at a site to be determined

==== Semifinals and finals ====
2027 College Basketball Invitational

=== College Basketball Crown ===
Once the NCAA tournament field is announced, the College Basketball Crown tournament will invite eight teams to participate in the event, the Big Ten, Big 12, and Big East Conferences will receive two bids each, and the other two will be given at-large. The Crown will be held at various venues on the Las Vegas Strip in Paradise, Nevada, the week before and during the NCAA Tournament Final Four.

==== Semifinals and finals ====
2027 College Basketball Crown

== Coaching changes ==
Many teams will change coaches during the season and after it ends

| Team | Former | Interim | New | Reason |
|---|---|---|---|---|
| Nevada | Steve Alford | | | Alford, set to begin his eighth season at Nevada, announced on September 24, 2026 that he will retire at the end of the season. |
| Oregon | Dana Altman | Tony Stubblefield | | On October 7, 2026, Altman announced his retirement after 17 seasons at Oregon. He finished his career at Oregon with a 382–182 record, ten NCAA tournaments and one final four appearance in 2017. Ducks assistant coach Tony Stubblefield was promoted to interim head coach for the 2026–27 season. |
| UTSA | Austin Claunch | Nick Bowman | | UTSA and Claunch mutually agreed to part ways on November 13, 2026. Claunch, who was starting his 3rd season at UTSA, had been suspended since late October following a DWI arrest. Roadrunners assistant coach Bowman, who had been named interim head coach during Claunch's suspension, will continue in that role for the season. |

== Attendances ==
The Top 30 NCAA Division I men's basketball teams by average home attendance.

== Television viewers and ratings ==
=== Most watched regular season games ===
| Rank | Game | Date | Time (ET) | Matchup | Network | Viewers (millions) | TV rating |
|---|---|---|---|---|---|---|---|
| TBD | TBD | TBD | TBD | | | | |

=== Most watched conference tournament games ===
| Rank | Tournament | Date | time (ET) | Matchup | Network | Viewers (millions) | TV rating |
|---|---|---|---|---|---|---|---|
| TBD | ACC Tournament | TBD | | | | | |
| TBD | Big 12 Tournament | TBD | | | | | |
| TBD | Big East Tournament | TBD | | | | | |
| TBD | SEC Tournament | TBD | | | | | |
| TBD | Big Ten Tournament | TBD | | | | | |

==== Most watched other conference tournament games ====
| Rank | Tournament | Date | time (ET) | Matchup | Network | Viewers (millions) | TV rating |
|---|---|---|---|---|---|---|---|
| TBD | MVC Tournament | TBD | | | | | |
| TBD | Big South Tournament | TBD | | | | | |
| TBD | Atlantic Sun Tournament | TBD | | | | | |
| TBD | Summit League Tournament | TBD | | | | | |
| TBD | Sun Belt Tournament | TBD | | | | | |
| TBD | Southern Tournament | TBD | | | | | |
| TBD | CAA Tournament | TBD | | | | | |
| TBD | NEC Tournament | TBD | | | | | |
| TBD | Horizon League Tournament | TBD | | | | | |
| TBD | Metro Tournament | TBD | | | | | |
| TBD | WCC Tournament | TBD | | | | | |
| TBD | Southland Tournament | TBD | | | | | |
| TBD | Patriot League Tournament | TBD | | | | | |
| TBD | Big Sky Tournament | TBD | | | | | |
| TBD | America East Tournament | TBD | | | | | |
| TBD | MEAC Tournament | TBD | | | | | |
| TBD | Mountain West Tournament | TBD | | | | | |
| TBD | SWAC Tournament | TBD | | | | | |
| TBD | MAC Tournament | TBD | | | | | |
| TBD | CUSA Tournament | TBD | | | | | |
| TBD | Big West Tournament | TBD | | | | | |
| TBD | UAC Tournament | TBD | | | | | |
| TBD | Ivy League Tournament | TBD | | | | | |
| TBD | Atlantic 10 Tournament | TBD | | | | | |
| TBD | American Tournament | TBD | | | | | |
| TBD | Pac-12 Tournament | TBD | | | | | |

=== Most watched tournament games ===
(#) Tournament seedings and region in parentheses.

| Rank | Round | Date and time (ET) | Matchup | Network | Viewers (millions) | TV rating |
|---|---|---|---|---|---|---|
| TBD | | | | | | |

== See also ==
- 2026–27 NCAA Division I women's basketball season
