= 2026–27 New Hampshire Wildcats men's basketball team =

American college basketball season

2026–27 New Hampshire Wildcats men's basketball
- Conference: America East Conference
- Record: 4-2 (0–0 America East)
- Head coach: Nathan Davis (4th season)
- Assistant coaches: Tyler Wilson; Luis Guzman; Dennis Csensits; Matt Cinelli
- Home arena: Lundholm Gym

2026–27 America East Conference men's basketball standings
	Conf.				Overall
Team	W		L	PCT	W		L	PCT
UMass Lowell	0	–	0	–	4	–	1	.800
Albany	0	–	0	–	3	–	2	.600
Binghamton	0	–	0	–	3	–	2	.600
New Hampshire	0	–	0	–	3	–	2	.600
UMBC	0	–	0	–	3	–	3	.500
Vermont	0	–	0	–	2	–	2	.500
Bryant	0	–	0	–	2	–	4	.333
Maine	0	–	0	–	1	–	4	.200
NJIT	0	–	0	–	1	–	5	.167
† 2027 AmEast tournament winner As of November 19, 2026; Rankings from AP poll

The 2026–27 New Hampshire Wildcats men's basketball team will represent the University of New Hampshire during the 2026–27 NCAA Division I men's basketball season. The Wildcats, who will be led by fourth-year head coach Nathan Davis, will play their home games at the Lundholm Gym in Durham, New Hampshire as members of the America East Conference.

== Previous season ==
The Wildcats finished the 2025–26 season 9–21, 5–11 in America East play, to finish in a tie for seventh place. As the #8 seed in the America East tournament, they were defeated by #1 seed and eventual tournament champions UMBC in the quarterfinals.

== Preseason ==
On September 28, 2026, the America East Conference released their preseason polls. New Hampshire was picked to finish ninth (last) in the conference.

=== Preseason rankings ===
America East Preseason Poll
Place	Team	Votes
1	Vermont	62 (7)
2	UMBC	46 (1)
3	Binghamton	45 (1)
4	NJIT	38
5	Bryant	36
6	Albany	34
7	UMass Lowell	31
8	Maine	19
9	New Hampshire	13
(#) first-place votes

=== Preseason All-America East Team ===
No players were named to the Preseason All-America East Team.

== Roster ==
2026–27 New Hampshire Wildcats men's basketball team
Players
Coaches

Pos.	#	Name	Height	Weight	Year	Previous school	Hometown
G	0	Tyler Bike	5 ft 10 in (1.78 m)	170 lb (77 kg)	So	Phillips Exeter Academy	Merrimack, New Hampshire
G	1	Jeremiah Faumuina	6 ft 5 in (1.96 m)	195 lb (88 kg)	Fr	Overtime Elite	Oakland, California
G	2	Erik Oliver-Bush	6 ft 5 in (1.96 m)	215 lb (98 kg)	Jr	Manhattan	Trenton, New Jersey
G	3	Parth Miglani	6 ft 2 in (1.88 m)	185 lb (84 kg)	Fr	Brewster Academy	Hollis, New Hampshire
G	4	Myles Blackley	6 ft 4 in (1.93 m)	170 lb (77 kg)	So	Immaculate Conception High School	Summit, New Jersey
F	5	Drew McKenna	6 ft 8 in (2.03 m)	220 lb (100 kg)	Jr	Old Dominion	Laurel, Maryland
F/C	6	Giannos Xanthopoulos	6 ft 10 in (2.08 m)	220 lb (100 kg)	So	Fort Erie International Academy	Zografou, Greece
F	7	John Squire	6 ft 8 in (2.03 m)	220 lb (100 kg)	Jr	City College of San Francisco	Sausalito, California
G/F	8	Nicholas Sangermano II	6 ft 5 in (1.96 m)	—	Fr	Loomis Chaffee School	Salem, New Hampshire
G	10	Adam Squire	6 ft 1 in (1.85 m)	185 lb (84 kg)	Jr	Indian River State College	Miami, Florida
G	11	Josiah Coleman	6 ft 4 in (1.93 m)	196 lb (89 kg)	So	Weatherford College	Plymouth, Minnesota
F	15	Davide Poser	6 ft 4 in (1.93 m)	206 lb (93 kg)	Sr	Pallacanestro Bernareggio 99	Veneto, Italy
F	21	Ryan Zan	6 ft 7 in (2.01 m)	—	Sr	Fairfield	Princeton, New Jersey
F	22	Kaleb Myers	6 ft 8 in (2.03 m)	200 lb (91 kg)	Jr	St. Thomas (FL)	Bluefields, Nicaragua
F	24	Jon O'Neill	6 ft 9 in (2.06 m)	216 lb (98 kg)	Jr	Kaukauna High School	Kaukauna, Wisconsin

Head coach

- Nathan Davis (Randolph–Macon)

Assistant coach(es)

- Tyler Wilson (Manhattan)
- Luis Guzman (Temple)
- Dennis Csensits (DeSales)
- Matt Cinelli (Syracuse)

Legend

- (C) Team captain
- (S) Suspended
- (I) Ineligible
- (W) Walk-on
- Injured
- Current redshirt

Roster
Last update: October 20, 2026

== Schedule and results ==
Date time, TV	Rank^{#}	Opponent^{#}	Result	Record	Site (attendance) city, state
Non-conference regular season
November 2, 2026*; 7:00 pm, ESPN+		at Brown	W 59–55	1–0	Pizzitola Sports Center (707); Providence, RI
November 5, 2026*; 7:00 pm, ESPN+		at Rider; America East-Metro Challenge	W 66–55	2–0	Canastra Hammer Arena (470); Lawrenceville, NJ
November 8, 2026*; 1:00 pm		Sacred Heart; America East-Metro Challenge	L 76-81	2-1	Lundholm Gym (381); Durham, NH
November 11, 2026*; 6:00 pm		Thomas	W 114-55	3-1	Lundholm Gym (330); Durham, NH
November 15, 2026*; 1:30 pm, ACCNX		at Boston College	L 55-67	3-2	Conte Forum (2,606); Chestnut Hill, MA
November 18, 2026*; 8:00 pm		at Stonehill	W 90-70	4-2	Merkert Gymnasium (305); Easton, MA
November 21, 2026*		at New Haven			Hazell Center; West Haven, CT
November 24, 2026*; 7:00 pm, ESPN+		at Seton Hall			Prudential Center; Newark, NJ
November 29, 2026*; 2:00 pm		at Holy Cross			Hart Center; Worcester, MA
December 2, 2026*; 6:00 pm		Harvard			Lundholm Gym; Durham, NH
December 5, 2026*; 4:30 pm		at Boston University			Case Gym; Boston, MA
December 9, 2026*; 7:30 pm, ESPN+		at Marquette			Fiserv Forum; Milwaukee, WI
December 12, 2026*; 1:00 pm		Dartmouth; Rivalry			Lundholm Gym; Durham, NH
December 20, 2026*; 1:00 pm		Manhattan			Lundholm Gym; Durham, NH
December 22, 2026*; 1:00 pm		Fairfield			Lundholm Gym; Durham, NH
December 29, 2026*; 8:00 pm, CBSSN		at Iowa State			Hilton Coliseum; Ames, IA
America East regular season
January 2, 2027; 2:00 pm		at UMass Lowell			Tsongas Center; Lowell, MA
January 7, 2027; 6:00 pm		UMBC			Lundholm Gym; Durham, NH
January 9, 2027; 12:00 pm		NJIT			Lundholm Gym; Durham, NH
January 14, 2027; 6:00 pm		Vermont			Lundholm Gym; Durham, NH
January 21, 2027; 6:30 pm		at Albany			Broadview Center; Guilderland, NY
January 23, 2027; 2:00 pm		at Binghamton			Events Center; Vestal, NY
January 28, 2027; 6:00 pm		Bryant			Lundholm Gym; Durham, NH
January 30, 2027; 2:00 pm		at Maine			Memorial Gymnasium; Orono, ME
February 4, 2027; 7:00 pm		at Vermont			Patrick Gym; Burlington, VT
February 6, 2027; 2:00 pm		UMass Lowell			Lundholm Gym; Durham, NH
February 11, 2027; 7:00 pm		at NJIT			Wellness and Events Center; Newark, NJ
February 13, 2027; 1:00 pm		at UMBC			Chesapeake Employers Insurance Arena; Catonsville, MD
February 20, 2027; 1:00 pm		Maine			Lundholm Gym; Durham, NH
February 25, 2027; 6:00 pm		Albany			Lundholm Gym; Durham, NH
February 27, 2027; 12:00 pm		Binghamton			Lundholm Gym; Durham, NH
March 2, 2027; 6:00 pm		at Bryant			Chace Athletic Center; Smithfield, RI
*Non-conference game. ^{#}Rankings from AP poll. (#) Tournament seedings in parentheses. All times are in Eastern.
