= 2026–27 Bryant Bulldogs men's basketball team =

American college basketball season

2025–26 Bryant Bulldogs men's basketball
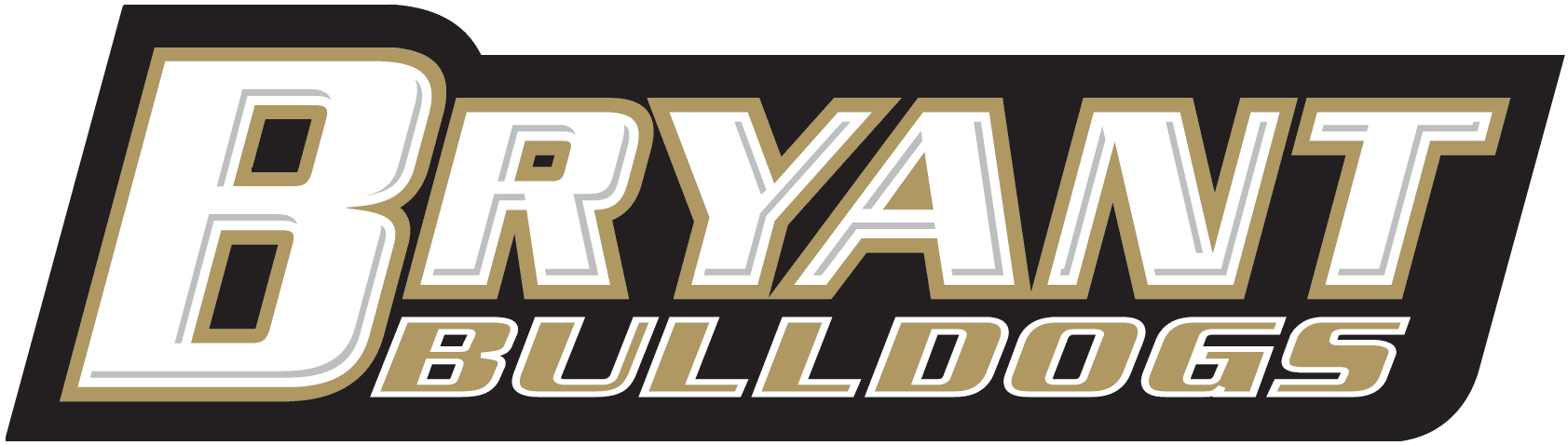
- Conference: America East Conference
- Record: 2-4 (0–0 America East)
- Head coach: Jamion Christian (2nd season)
- Associate head coach: Harley Fuller
- Assistant coaches: Zavier Anderson; Morgan Williams; Randy Phillips
- Home arena: Chace Athletic Center

2026–27 America East Conference men's basketball standings
| | Conf. | | | | Overall |
| Team | W | | L | PCT | W | | L | PCT |
|---|---|---|---|---|---|---|---|---|
| UMass Lowell | 0 | – | 0 | – | 4 | – | 1 | .800 |
| Albany | 0 | – | 0 | – | 3 | – | 2 | .600 |
| Binghamton | 0 | – | 0 | – | 3 | – | 2 | .600 |
| New Hampshire | 0 | – | 0 | – | 3 | – | 2 | .600 |
| UMBC | 0 | – | 0 | – | 3 | – | 3 | .500 |
| Vermont | 0 | – | 0 | – | 2 | – | 2 | .500 |
| Bryant | 0 | – | 0 | – | 2 | – | 4 | .333 |
| Maine | 0 | – | 0 | – | 1 | – | 4 | .200 |
| NJIT | 0 | – | 0 | – | 1 | – | 5 | .167 |
† 2027 AmEast tournament winner As of November 19, 2026; Rankings from AP poll

The 2026–27 Bryant Bulldogs men's basketball team will represent Bryant University during the 2026–27 NCAA Division I men's basketball season. The Bulldogs, who will be led by second-year head coach Jamion Christian, will play their home games at the Chace Athletic Center in Smithfield, Rhode Island as members of the America East Conference.

== Previous season ==
The Bulldogs finished the 2025–26 season 9–22, 5–11 in America East play, to finish in a tie for seventh place. As the #7 seed in the America East tournament, they were defeated by #2 seed Vermont in the quarterfinals.

== Preseason ==
On September 28, 2026, the America East Conference released their preseason polls. Bryant was picked to finish fifth in the conference.

=== Preseason rankings ===
America East Preseason Poll
| Place | Team | Votes |
|---|---|---|
| 1 | Vermont | 62 (7) |
| 2 | UMBC | 46 (1) |
| 3 | Binghamton | 45 (1) |
| 4 | NJIT | 38 |
| 5 | Bryant | 36 |
| 6 | Albany | 34 |
| 7 | UMass Lowell | 31 |
| 8 | Maine | 19 |
| 9 | New Hampshire | 13 |
(#) first-place votes

=== Preseason All-America East Team ===
Preseason All-America East Team
| Player | Year | Position |
|---|---|---|
| Keegan Harvey | Senior | Forward |

== Roster ==
2026–27 Bryant Bulldogs men's basketball team
Players
Coaches

| Pos. | # | Name | Height | Weight | Year | Previous school | Hometown |
|---|---|---|---|---|---|---|---|
| F | 0 | Duane Thompson | 6 ft 8 in (2.03 m) | 210 lb (95 kg) | Jr | Midland College | Boston, Massachusetts |
| G | 1 | Ty Tabales | 6 ft 2 in (1.88 m) | 170 lb (77 kg) | So | New Hampton School | Worcester, Massachusetts |
| G | 2 | Eric Chatfield Jr. | 6 ft 0 in (1.83 m) | 160 lb (73 kg) | So | Georgia Tech | Atlanta, Georgia |
| G | 3 | Elijah Crispin | 6 ft 3 in (1.91 m) | 190 lb (86 kg) | Fr | Perkiomen School | Pitman, New Jersey |
| F | 5 | Onyx Nnani | 6 ft 9 in (2.06 m) | 215 lb (98 kg) | So | South Florida | Edmonton, Alberta |
| G | 8 | Elijah Hayeems | 6 ft 5 in (1.96 m) | 200 lb (91 kg) | Fr | Big Tyme Prep Academy | San Francisco, California |
| F | 9 | Roi Behar | 6 ft 6 in (1.98 m) | 200 lb (91 kg) | Fr | Elitzur Shomron | Tel Aviv, Israel |
| F | 11 | Connor Lyons | 6 ft 8 in (2.03 m) | 210 lb (95 kg) | Fr | Miller School of Albemarle | Charlottesville, Virginia |
| G | 13 | Thor Grissom | 6 ft 3 in (1.91 m) | 185 lb (84 kg) | Fr | Darrow School | The Colony, Texas |
| F | 14 | Keegan Harvey | 6 ft 11 in (2.11 m) | 230 lb (104 kg) | GS | George Washington | Newcastle, Australia |
| F | 15 | Andre Pasha | 6 ft 9 in (2.06 m) | 215 lb (98 kg) | Jr | New Haven | Syracuse, New York |
| F | 19 | Tim Nwankwo | 6 ft 8 in (2.03 m) | 200 lb (91 kg) | Fr | Merrist Wood College | London, England |
| G | 21 | Frankie Vassalluzzo | 6 ft 0 in (1.83 m) | 175 lb (79 kg) | Jr | Pine Crest School | Boca Raton, Florida |
| G | 22 | Jason Sepe | 6 ft 3 in (1.91 m) | 170 lb (77 kg) | Jr | Ponaganset High School | Foster, Rhode Island |
| F | 23 | Grady Payton | 6 ft 10 in (2.08 m) | 195 lb (88 kg) | Fr | Capital City High School | Jefferson City, Missouri |
| G | 25 | Reed Woerner | 6 ft 4 in (1.93 m) | 200 lb (91 kg) | So | Shepaug Valley School | Bridgewater, Connecticut |
| G | 30 | Michael DeOrsey | 5 ft 11 in (1.8 m) | 170 lb (77 kg) | So | North Kingstown High School | North Kingstown, Rhode Island |

Head coach

- Jamion Christian (Mount St. Mary's)

Assistant coach(es)

- Harley Fuller (Molloy)
- Zavier Anderson (Clemson)
- Morgan Williams (Mount St. Mary's)
- Randy Phillips (Radford)

Legend

- (C) Team captain
- (S) Suspended
- (I) Ineligible
- (W) Walk-on
- Injured
- Current redshirt

Roster
Last update: October 18, 2026

== Schedule and results ==
| Date time, TV | Rank^{#} | Opponent^{#} | Result | Record | Site (attendance) city, state |
Non-conference regular season
| November 2, 2026*; 8:00 pm, ESPN+ | | Siena | W 80–75 | 1–0 | Chace Athletic Center (1,123); Smithfield, RI |
| November 5, 2026*; 7:00 pm, ESPN+ | | at Quinnipiac; America East-Metro Challenge | L 56–66 | 1–1 | M&T Bank Arena (1,349); Hamden, CT |
| November 8, 2026*; 1:00 pm, ESPN+ | | Fairfield; America East-Metro Challenge | L 59–68 | 1–2 | Chace Athletic Center (714); Smithfield, RI |
| November 10, 2026*; 7:00 pm, ESPN+ | | at Providence | L 55–78 | 1–3 | Amica Mutual Pavilion (10,221); Providence, RI |
| November 13, 2026*; 6:00 pm, BTN/B1G+ | | at Rutgers | L 51–72 | 1–4 | Jersey Mike's Arena (7,932); Piscataway, NJ |
| November 17, 2026*; 7:30 pm, ESPN+ | | at UMass | W 83–79 ^{OT} | 2–4 | Mullins Center (2,533); Amherst, MA |
| November 20, 2026*; 6:00 pm, ESPN+ | | Worcester State | | | Chace Athletic Center; Smithfield, RI |
| November 24, 2026*; 7:00 pm, ESPN+ | | at Marist | | | McCann Arena; Poughkeepsie, NY |
| November 29, 2026*; 4:00 pm, ESPN+ | | Iona | | | Chace Athletic Center; Smithfield, RI |
| December 1, 2026*; 6:00 pm, ESPN+ | | Vassar | | | Chace Athletic Center; Smithfield, RI |
| December 4, 2026*; 6:00 pm, ESPN+ | | Brown | | | Chace Athletic Center; Smithfield, RI |
| December 8, 2026*; 7:30 pm, ESPN2 | | at Kentucky | | | Rupp Arena; Lexington, KY |
| December 10, 2026*; 7:00 pm, ESPN+ | | at Fordham | | | Rose Hill Gymnasium; Bronx, NY |
| December 20, 2026*; 1:00 pm, ESPN+ | | Delaware | | | Chace Athletic Center; Smithfield, RI |
| December 22, 2026*; 7:00 pm, ESPN+ | | at George Mason | | | EagleBank Arena; Fairfax, VA |
| December 29, 2026*; 2:00 pm, ESPN+ | | Harvard | | | Chace Athletic Center; Smithfield, RI |
America East regular season
| January 2, 2027; 4:00 pm, ESPN+ | | Maine | | | Chace Athletic Center; Smithfield, RI |
| January 7, 2027; 6:30 p.m., ESPN+ | | at Albany | | | Broadview Center; Guilderland, NY |
| January 9, 2027; 2:00 pm, ESPN+ | | at UMass Lowell | | | Kennedy Family Athletic Complex; Lowell, MA |
| January 14, 2027; 6:00 pm, ESPN+ | | UMBC | | | Chace Athletic Center; Smithfield, RI |
| January 18, 2027; 2:00 pm, ESPN+ | | at Vermont | | | Patrick Gym; Burlington, VT |
| January 21, 2027; 6:00 pm, ESPN+ | | NJIT | | | Chace Athletic Center; Smithfield, RI |
| January 28, 2027; 6:00 pm | | at New Hampshire | | | Lundholm Gym; Durham, NH |
| January 30, 2027; 4:00 pm | | Binghamton | | | Chace Athletic Center; Smithfield, RI |
| February 4, 2027; 6:00 pm | | at UMBC | | | Chesapeake Employers Insurance Arena; Catonsville, MD |
| February 6, 2027; 4:00 pm | | Vermont | | | Chace Athletic Center; Smithfield, RI |
| February 11, 2027; 6:00 pm | | Albany | | | Chace Athletic Center; Smithfield, RI |
| February 17, 2027; 6:00 pm | | at Maine | | | Memorial Gymnasium; Orono, ME |
| February 20, 2027; 2:00 pm | | at Binghamton | | | Events Center; Vestal, NY |
| February 25, 2027; 6:00 pm | | UMass Lowell | | | Chace Athletic Center; Smithfield, RI |
| February 27, 2027; 4:00 pm | | at NJIT | | | Wellness and Events Center; Newark, NJ |
| March 2, 2027; 6:00 pm | | New Hampshire | | | Chace Athletic Center; Smithfield, RI |
*Non-conference game. ^{#}Rankings from AP poll. (#) Tournament seedings in parentheses. All times are in Eastern.
