= 2026–27 NJIT Highlanders men's basketball team =

American college basketball season

2026–27 NJIT Highlanders men's basketball
- Conference: America East Conference
- Record: 1–6 (0–0 America East)
- Head coach: Grant Billmeier (4th season)
- Assistant coaches: RaShawn Stores; Pete Lappas; Thomas Messinger
- Home arena: Wellness and Events Center

2026–27 America East Conference men's basketball standings
	Conf.				Overall
Team	W		L	PCT	W		L	PCT
UMass Lowell	0	–	0	–	4	–	1	.800
New Hampshire	0	–	0	–	4	–	2	.667
Albany	0	–	0	–	3	–	2	.600
Binghamton	0	–	0	–	3	–	3	.500
UMBC	0	–	0	–	3	–	3	.500
Vermont	0	–	0	–	2	–	3	.400
Bryant	0	–	0	–	2	–	4	.333
Maine	0	–	0	–	1	–	4	.200
NJIT	0	–	0	–	1	–	6	.143
† 2027 AmEast tournament winner As of November 19, 2026; Rankings from AP poll

The 2026–27 NJIT Highlanders men's basketball team will represent the New Jersey Institute of Technology during the 2026–27 NCAA Division I men's basketball season. The Highlanders, who will be led by fourth-year head coach Grant Billmeier, will play their home games at the Wellness and Events Center in Newark, New Jersey as members of the America East Conference.

== Previous season ==
The Highlanders finished the 2025–26 season 16–17, 10–6 in America East play, to finish in third place. As the #3 seed in the America East tournament, they defeated #6 seed Maine in the quarterfinals, before falling to #2 seed Vermont in the semifinals.

== Preseason ==
On September 28, 2026, the America East Conference released their preseason polls. NJIT was picked to finish fourth in the conference.

=== Preseason rankings ===
America East Preseason Poll
Place	Team	Votes
1	Vermont	62 (7)
2	UMBC	46 (1)
3	Binghamton	45 (1)
4	NJIT	38
5	Bryant	36
6	Albany	34
7	UMass Lowell	31
8	Maine	19
9	New Hampshire	13
(#) first-place votes

=== Preseason All-America East Team ===
Preseason All-America East Team
Player	Year	Position
David Bolden	Sophomore	Guard

== Roster ==
2026–27 NJIT Highlanders men's basketball team
Players
Coaches

Pos.	#	Name	Height	Weight	Year	Previous school	Hometown
G/F	0	Jayonni Durrough	6 ft 6 in (1.98 m)	210 lb (95 kg)	Fr	ABC Prep	Las Vegas, Nevada
G	1	David Bolden	6 ft 0 in (1.83 m)	185 lb (84 kg)	So	Nicolet High School	Milwaukee, Wisconsin
G	2	Mario Tatum Jr.	6 ft 3 in (1.91 m)	190 lb (86 kg)	So	VMI	Edgewood, Maryland
G	5	AJ Altobelli	6 ft 0 in (1.83 m)	165 lb (75 kg)	So	Union Catholic Regional High School	Westfield, New Jersey
F	6	Victor Vanderstraeten	6 ft 8 in (2.03 m)	230 lb (104 kg)	Fr	Topsportschool Antwerp	Antwerp, Belgium
F	10	Mathéo Coffi	6 ft 10 in (2.08 m)	210 lb (95 kg)	So	UTSA	Strasbourg, France
G	12	Brandon Stores Jr.	6 ft 5 in (1.96 m)	210 lb (95 kg)	RS Fr	Georgia Tech	Bronx, New York
C	13	Stefan Jimenez-Vojnic	6 ft 11 in (2.11 m)	230 lb (104 kg)	RS So	Academy of Central Florida	Toronto, Ontario
G	14	Quentin Duncan	6 ft 4 in (1.93 m)	180 lb (82 kg)	Jr	Putnam Science Academy	Waterbury, Connecticut
F	22	Brendan Oliver	6 ft 6 in (1.98 m)	195 lb (88 kg)	So	Canisius	West Orange, New Jersey
F	25	John Kelly	6 ft 9 in (2.06 m)	215 lb (98 kg)	Jr	Rutgers Prep	Hillsborough, New Jersey
F	33	Zack Scherler	6 ft 11 in (2.11 m)	245 lb (111 kg)	So	Vermont Academy	Clarkston, Michigan
G	44	Rocco Awad	6 ft 2 in (1.88 m)	195 lb (88 kg)	So	London Basketball Academy	Windsor, Ontario

Head coach

- Grant Billmeier (Seton Hall)

Assistant coach(es)

- RaShawn Stores (Manhattan)
- Pete Lappas (Boston College)
- Thomas Messinger (Emerson)

Legend

- (C) Team captain
- (S) Suspended
- (I) Ineligible
- (W) Walk-on
- Injured
- Current redshirt

Roster
Last update: October 20, 2026

== Schedule and results ==
Date time, TV	Rank^{#}	Opponent^{#}	Result	Record	High points	High rebounds	High assists	Site (attendance) city, state
Exhibition
October 18, 2026*; 11:30 am		American	W 71–66	–	–	–	–	Wellness and Events Center; Newark, NJ
Non-conference regular season
November 2, 2026*; 7:00 pm, ESPN+		at Dayton	L 58–89	0–1	12 – Coffi	5 – Coffi	4 – Bolden	UD Arena (13,407); Dayton, OH
November 5, 2026*; 7:00 pm, ESPN+		at Iona; America East-Metro Challenge	L 49–72	0–2	14 – Vanderstraeten	7 – Vanderstraeten	5 – Bolden	Hynes Athletics Center (1,701); New Rochelle, NY
November 8, 2026*; 4:00 pm, ESPN+		Saint Peter's; America East-Metro Challenge	W 54–52	1–2	15 – Stores Jr.	6 – Coffi	3 – Tied	Wellness and Events Center (752); Newark, NJ
November 10, 2026*; 6:30 pm, BTN		at Rutgers	L 64–101	1–3	18 – Bolden	10 – Vanderstraeten	3 – Tied	Jersey Mike's Arena (7,026); Piscataway, NJ
November 11, 2026*; 7:00 pm, MASN/ESPN+		at VCU	L 49–87	1–4	10 – Vanderstraeten	8 – Vanderstraeten	3 – Bolden	Siegel Center (6,230); Richmond, VA
November 14, 2026*; 7:00 pm		at Fairfield	L 60–63	1–5	13 – Tatum Jr.	12 – Vanderstraeten	7 – Bolden	Leo D. Mahoney Arena (1,566); Fairfield, CT
November 18, 2026*; 7:00 pm		at Fairleigh Dickinson	L 66–78	1–6	17 – Bolden	6 – Tied	3 – Bolden	Bogota Savings Bank Center (575); Hackensack, NJ
November 22, 2026*; 5:00 pm, ACCN		at Boston College						Conte Forum; Chestnut Hill, MA
November 25, 2026*; 2:00 pm, ESPN+		Manhattan						Wellness and Events Center; Newark, NJ
November 29, 2026*; 2:00 pm		at Sacred Heart						William H. Pitt Center; Fairfield, CT
December 2, 2026*; 7:00 pm, ESPN+		Navy						Wellness and Events Center; Newark, NJ
December 7, 2026*; 7:00 pm, ESPN+		at Seton Hall						Prudential Center; Newark, NJ
December 9, 2026*; 7:00 pm		at New Haven						Hazell Center; West Haven, CT
December 13, 2026*; 4:00 pm, ESPN+		Drexel						Wellness and Events Center; Newark, NJ
December 23, 2026*; 1:00 pm, NECFR		at Wagner						Spiro Sports Center; Staten Island, NY
December 29, 2026*; 2:00 pm, ESPN+		Saint Elizabeth						Wellness and Events Center; Newark, NJ
America East regular season
January 2, 2027; 1:00 pm, ESPN+		at UMBC						Chesapeake Employers Insurance Arena; Catonsville, MD
January 7, 2027; 6:00 pm, ESPN+		at Maine						Memorial Gymnasium; Orono, ME
January 9, 2027; 12:00 pm, ESPN+		at New Hampshire						Lundholm Gym; Durham, NH
January 14, 2027; 11:00 am, ESPN+		Albany						Wellness and Events Center; Newark, NJ
January 18, 2027; 2:00 pm, ESPN+		Binghamton						Wellness and Events Center; Newark, NJ
January 21, 2027; 6:00 pm, ESPN+		at Bryant						Chace Athletic Center; Smithfield, RI
January 23, 2027; 4:00 pm, ESPN+		Vermont						Wellness and Events Center; Newark, NJ
January 30, 2027; 4:00 pm, ESPN+		UMass Lowell						Wellness and Events Center; Newark, NJ
February 4, 2027; 6:30 pm, ESPN+		at Albany						Broadview Center; Guilderland, NY
February 6, 2027; 2:00 pm, ESPN+		at Binghamton						Events Center; Vestal, NY
February 11, 2027; 7:00 pm, ESPN+		New Hampshire						Wellness and Events Center; Newark, NJ
February 13, 2027; 4:00 pm, ESPN+		Maine						Wellness and Events Center; Newark, NJ
February 18, 2027; 6:00 pm, ESPN+		at UMass Lowell						Kennedy Family Athletic Complex; Lowell, MA
February 20, 2027; 3:00 pm, ESPN+		at Vermont						Patrick Gym; Burlington, VT
February 25, 2027; 7:30 pm, ESPN+		UMBC						Wellness and Events Center; Newark, NJ
February 27, 2027; 4:00 pm, ESPN+		Bryant						Wellness and Events Center; Newark, NJ
*Non-conference game. ^{#}Rankings from AP poll. (#) Tournament seedings in parentheses. All times are in Eastern.
