= 2026–27 UMBC Retrievers men's basketball team =

American college basketball season

2026–27 UMBC Retrievers men's basketball
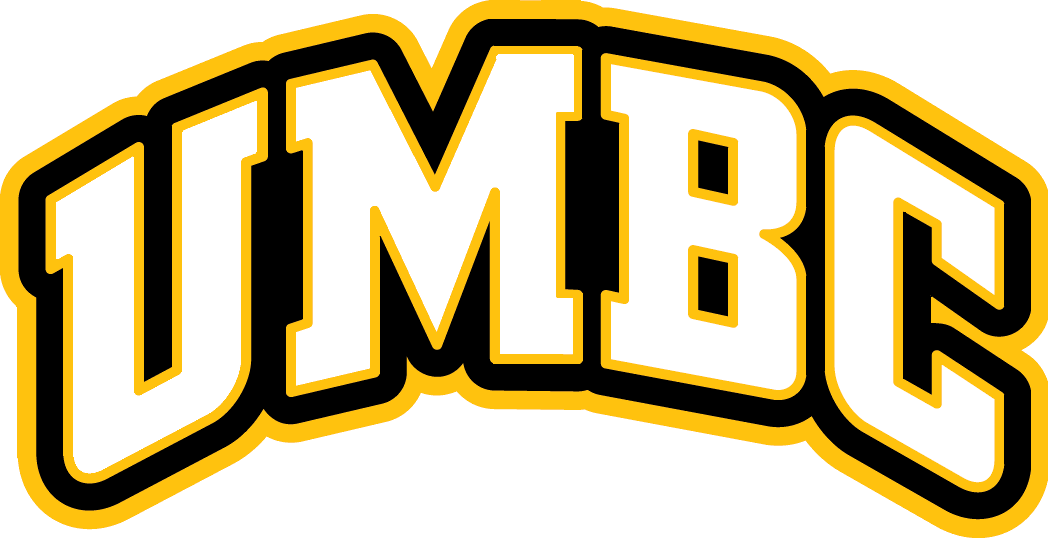
- Conference: America East Conference
- Record: 3-4 (0–0 America East)
- Head coach: Jim Ferry (6th season)
- Assistant coaches: Evann Baker; Sean Neal; Ceasar Adim; Ethan Lynch; Jonas Alger
- Home arena: Chesapeake Employers Insurance Arena

2026–27 America East Conference men's basketball standings
	Conf.				Overall
Team	W		L	PCT	W		L	PCT
UMass Lowell	0	–	0	–	4	–	1	.800
New Hampshire	0	–	0	–	4	–	2	.667
Albany	0	–	0	–	3	–	2	.600
Binghamton	0	–	0	–	3	–	3	.500
UMBC	0	–	0	–	3	–	4	.429
Vermont	0	–	0	–	2	–	3	.400
Bryant	0	–	0	–	2	–	4	.333
Maine	0	–	0	–	2	–	4	.333
NJIT	0	–	0	–	1	–	6	.143
† 2027 AmEast tournament winner As of November 20, 2026; Rankings from AP poll

The 2026–27 UMBC Retrievers men's basketball team will represent the University of Maryland, Baltimore County during the 2026–27 NCAA Division I men's basketball season. The Retrievers, who will be led by sixth-year head coach Jim Ferry, will play their home games at the Chesapeake Employers Insurance Arena in Catonsville, Maryland as members of the America East Conference.

== Previous season ==
The Retrievers finished the 2025–26 season 24–9, 14–2 in America East play, to finish as America East regular season champions. As the top seed in the America East tournament, they defeated #8 seed New Hampshire in the quarterfinals, #4 seed UMass Lowell in the semifinals, and #2 seed Vermont to win the America East tournament championship, sending them to just their third ever NCAA tournament appearance, and their first since their historic 2018 tournament run. In the NCAA tournament, the Retrievers received the #16 seed in the Midwest Region, where they lost in the First Four to fellow #16 region seed Howard.

== Preseason ==
On September 28, 2026, the America East Conference released their preseason polls. UMBC was picked to finish second in the conference, receiving one out of a possible nine first-place votes.

=== Preseason rankings ===
America East Preseason Poll
Place	Team	Votes
1	Vermont	62 (7)
2	UMBC	46 (1)
3	Binghamton	45 (1)
4	NJIT	38
5	Bryant	36
6	Albany	34
7	UMass Lowell	31
8	Maine	19
9	New Hampshire	13
(#) first-place votes

=== Preseason All-America East Team ===
No players were named to the Preseason All-America East Team.

== Roster ==
2026–27 UMBC Retrievers men's basketball team
Players
Coaches

Pos.	#	Name	Height	Weight	Year	Previous school	Hometown
F	0	Regimantas Ciunys	6 ft 6 in (1.98 m)	190 lb (86 kg)	RS Sr	The Harvey School	Vilnius, Lithuania
G	1	Flash Burton	6 ft 3 in (1.91 m)	185 lb (84 kg)	Jr	Rider	Philadelphia, Pennsylvania
F	2	JP Ndong	6 ft 7 in (2.01 m)	200 lb (91 kg)	So	State Fair Community College	Málaga, Spain
G	3	Evan Morton	6 ft 2 in (1.88 m)	180 lb (82 kg)	So	East Stroudsburg	Matthews, North Carolina
G	4	Aidan Able	6 ft 4 in (1.93 m)	200 lb (91 kg)	Fr	The John Carroll School	Baltimore, Maryland
G	5	Carlos Varela	6 ft 4 in (1.93 m)	190 lb (86 kg)	Fr	IES Sancti Petri	San Fernando, Spain
F	10	Steven Huan	7 ft 0 in (2.13 m)	235 lb (107 kg)	Fr	St. Andrew's Episcopal School	Beijing, China
G/F	11	Jaiden Reynolds	6 ft 6 in (1.98 m)	200 lb (91 kg)	Jr	Odessa College	Syracuse, New York
G/F	12	Jovan Ristic	6 ft 5 in (1.96 m)	215 lb (98 kg)	Jr	Saint Anselm	Belgrade, Serbia
G	13	Devin Ceaser	6 ft 1 in (1.85 m)	180 lb (82 kg)	RS Sr	Old Dominion	Waldorf, Maryland
G	15	Taesyn Slating	6 ft 5 in (1.96 m)	195 lb (88 kg)	Jr	SUNY Erie	Eden, New York
F	21	Alpha Barry	6 ft 9 in (2.06 m)	215 lb (98 kg)	Jr	Gulf Coast State College	Queens, New York
G	22	Leo Ferry	5 ft 10 in (1.78 m)	160 lb (73 kg)	Jr	Salisbury	Merrick, New York
F	23	Riley Jacobs	6 ft 10 in (2.08 m)	220 lb (100 kg)	So	St. Stephen's & St. Agnes School	Woodbridge, Virginia
G	95	Austin Cross	6 ft 3 in (1.91 m)	205 lb (93 kg)	So	Troy	Mansfield, Texas

Head coach

- Jim Ferry (Keene State)

Assistant coach(es)

- Evann Baker (Quinnipiac)
- Sean Neal (La Salle)
- Ceasar Adim (UMass)
- Ethan Lynch (UMBC)
- Jonas Alger (Kentucky)

Legend

- (C) Team captain
- (S) Suspended
- (I) Ineligible
- (W) Walk-on
- Injured
- Current redshirt

Roster
Last update: October 22, 2026

== Schedule and results ==
Date time, TV	Rank^{#}	Opponent^{#}	Result	Record	Site (attendance) city, state
Exhibition
October 11, 2026*; 2:00 pm		LIU	L 79–86	–	Chesapeake Employers Insurance Arena; Catonsville, MD
October 17, 2026*; 11:00 am		at Navy	W 61–55	–	Alumni Hall; Annapolis, MD
October 21, 2026*; 6:00 pm		at Fordham	L 67–87	–	Rose Hill Gymnasium; Bronx, NY
Non-conference regular season
November 2, 2026*; 4:00 pm, ESPN+		at George Mason	L 54–82	0–1	EagleBank Arena (3,290); Fairfax, VA
November 5, 2026*; 7:00 pm		at Marist; America East-Metro Challenge	L 80–88	0–2	McCann Arena (1,242); Poughkeepsie, NY
November 9, 2026*; 6:00 pm, ESPN+		McDaniel	W 91–61	1–2	Chesapeake Employers Insurance Arena (1,180); Catonsville, MD
November 12, 2026*; 6:00 pm		Morgan State; Under Armour 410 Invitational	W 85-70	2-2	Chesapeake Employers Insurance Arena (1,475); Catonsville, MD
November 14, 2026*; 5:00/7:30 pm		Towson/Loyola (MD); Under Armour 410 Invitational	L 42-68	2-3	Chesapeake Employers Insurance Arena (2,410); Catonsville, MD
November 16, 2026*; 6:00 pm		Iona; America East-Metro Challenge	W 75-67	3-3	Chesapeake Employers Insurance Arena (695); Catonsville, MD
November 19, 2026*; 7:00 pm, BTN		at Ohio State	L 62-101	3-4	Value City Arena (7,828); Columbus, OH
November 22, 2026*		Lancaster Bible			Chesapeake Employers Insurance Arena; Catonsville, MD
November 24, 2026*; 7:00 pm, B1G+		at Iowa			Carver–Hawkeye Arena; Iowa City, IA
November 27, 2026*; 4:00 pm, ESPN+		at George Washington			Charles E. Smith Center; Washington, D.C.
December 2, 2026*; 11:00 am		at Army			Christl Arena; West Point, NY
December 5, 2026*		at Delaware State			Memorial Hall; Dover, DE
December 8, 2026*; 6:00 pm		Bucknell			Chesapeake Employers Insurance Arena; Catonsville, MD
December 12, 2026*		at Wagner			Spiro Sports Center; Staten Island, NY
December 22, 2026*; 9:00 pm		at Grand Canyon			Global Credit Union Arena; Phoenix, AZ
December 29, 2026*; 6:00 pm		Coppin State			Chesapeake Employers Insurance Arena; Catonsville, MD
America East regular season
January 2, 2027; 1:00 pm		NJIT			Chesapeake Employers Insurance Arena; Catonsville, MD
January 7, 2027; 6:00 pm		at New Hampshire			Lundholm Gym; Durham, NH
January 9, 2027; 12:30 pm		at Maine			Memorial Gymnasium; Orono, ME
January 14, 2027; 6:00 pm		at Bryant			Chace Athletic Center; Smithfield, RI
January 18, 2027		Albany			Chesapeake Employers Insurance Arena; Catonsville, MD
January 21, 2027; 6:00 pm		Vermont			Chesapeake Employers Insurance Arena; Catonsville, MD
January 23, 2027; 1:00 pm		UMass Lowell			Chesapeake Employers Insurance Arena; Catonsville, MD
January 28, 2027; 6:07 pm		at Binghamton			Events Center; Vestal, NY
February 4, 2027; 6:00 pm		Bryant			Chesapeake Employers Insurance Arena; Catonsville, MD
February 6, 2027; 7:00 pm		at Albany			Broadview Center; Guilderland, NY
February 11, 2027; 6:00 pm		Maine			Chesapeake Employers Insurance Arena; Catonsville, MD
February 13, 2027; 1:00 pm		New Hampshire			Chesapeake Employers Insurance Arena; Catonsville, MD
February 18, 2027; 7:00 pm		at Vermont			Patrick Gym; Burlington, VT
February 20, 2027; 1:00 pm		at UMass Lowell			Kennedy Family Athletic Complex; Lowell, MA
February 25, 2027; 7:30 pm		at NJIT			Wellness and Events Center; Newark, NJ
March 2, 2027; 6:00 pm		Binghamton			Chesapeake Employers Insurance Arena; Catonsville, MD
*Non-conference game. ^{#}Rankings from AP poll. (#) Tournament seedings in parentheses. All times are in Eastern.
