= 2026–27 Albany Great Danes men's basketball team =

American college basketball season

2026–27 Albany Great Danes men's basketball
- Conference: America East Conference
- Record: 3–2 (0–0 America East)
- Head coach: Dwayne Killings (6th season)
- Assistant coaches: Jim Whitesell; Dan Madhavapallil; Willie Jenkins; Elijah Burns
- Home arena: Broadview Center

2026–27 America East Conference men's basketball standings
	Conf.				Overall
Team	W		L	PCT	W		L	PCT
UMass Lowell	0	–	0	–	3	–	1	.750
Albany	0	–	0	–	3	–	2	.600
Binghamton	0	–	0	–	3	–	2	.600
New Hampshire	0	–	0	–	3	–	2	.600
UMBC	0	–	0	–	3	–	3	.500
Vermont	0	–	0	–	2	–	2	.500
Bryant	0	–	0	–	1	–	4	.200
Maine	0	–	0	–	1	–	4	.200
NJIT	0	–	0	–	1	–	5	.167
† 2027 AmEast tournament winner As of November 17, 2026; Rankings from AP poll

The 2026-27 Albany Great Danes men's basketball team will represent the University at Albany, SUNY during the 2026-27 NCAA Division I men's basketball season. The Great Danes, will be led by sixth-year head coach Dwayne Killings, and playing their home games at the Broadview Center in Albany, New York as a member of the America East Conference.

== Previous season ==
The Great Danes finished the 2025–26 season 11–21, 7–9 in America East play, to finish in fifth place. As the 5th seed in the AmEast Tournament, they would lose to 4th seed UMass Lowell 81-76 in the Quarterfinals.

== Preseason ==
On September 28, 2026, the America East Conference released their preseason polls. Albany was picked to finish sixth in the conference.

=== Preseason rankings ===
America East Preseason Poll
Place	Team	Votes
1	Vermont	62 (7)
2	UMBC	46 (1)
3	Binghamton	45 (1)
4	NJIT	38
5	Bryant	36
6	Albany	34
7	UMass Lowell	31
8	Maine	19
9	New Hampshire	13
(#) first-place votes

=== Preseason All-America East Team ===
No players were named to the Preseason All-America East Team.

== Roster ==
2026–27 Albany Great Danes men's basketball team
Players
Coaches

Pos.	#	Name	Height	Weight	Year	Previous school	Hometown
G	0	Papa Kounta	6 ft 6 in (1.98 m)	200 lb (91 kg)	Jr	Triton College	Thiès, Senegal
G	1	Tyler Jones	6 ft 3 in (1.91 m)	185 lb (84 kg)	Fr	Christ School	Memphis, Tennessee
G	2	Ollie Engen	6 ft 5 in (1.96 m)	195 lb (88 kg)	Jr	Queen's (ON)	Kingston, Ontario
G	3	Wilkin Paulino	6 ft 2 in (1.88 m)	180 lb (82 kg)	So	Proctor Academy	Worcester, Massachusetts
G	4	Miles Rose	6 ft 4 in (1.93 m)	200 lb (91 kg)	RS Jr	St. Bonaventure	Rochester, New York
G	7	Abdoulaye Fall	6 ft 8 in (2.03 m)	210 lb (95 kg)	Sr	Indian Hills Community College	Dakar, Senegal
F	8	Benjamin Michaels	6 ft 8 in (2.03 m)	230 lb (104 kg)	Jr	Vermont	Ipswich, England
F	9	Erwann Bussing	6 ft 9 in (2.06 m)	230 lb (104 kg)	Fr	Limoges CSP	Montauban, France
G	11	Pedro Santos	6 ft 7 in (2.01 m)	200 lb (91 kg)	RS So	UT Martin	Porto, Portugal
C	13	Kean Webb	6 ft 11 in (2.11 m)	230 lb (104 kg)	RS So	Portland State	St. George, Utah
G	14	Zacharie Matulu	6 ft 5 in (1.96 m)	205 lb (93 kg)	RS Jr	Shaker High School	Albany, New York
G	19	Moustapha Ndao	6 ft 2 in (1.88 m)	—	Fr	Al Ahli	Dakar, Senegal
F	21	Petar Miovic	6 ft 8 in (2.03 m)	205 lb (93 kg)	Fr	KK Dubrovnik	Dubrovnik, Croatia
F	23	U-Mier Graham	6 ft 7 in (2.01 m)	215 lb (98 kg)	Fr	The Knox School	Albany, New York
C	24	Callum Smith	6 ft 11 in (2.11 m)	230 lb (104 kg)	Fr	Ridley College	Ottawa, Ontario

Head coach

- Dwayne Killings (Hampton)

Assistant coach(es)

- Jim Whitesell (Luther)
- Dan Madhavapallil (Marquette)
- Willie Jenkins (Tennessee Tech)
- Elijah Burns (Notre Dame)

Legend

- (C) Team captain
- (S) Suspended
- (I) Ineligible
- (W) Walk-on
- Injured
- Current redshirt

Roster
Last update: October 12, 2026

== Schedule and results ==
Date time, TV	Rank^{#}	Opponent^{#}	Result	Record	High points	High rebounds	High assists	Site (attendance) city, state
Non-conference regular season
November 2, 2026*; 6:30 p.m., ESPN+		Rhode Island College	W 74–67	1–0	25 – Engen	10 – Matulu	6 – Engen	Broadview Center (2,002); Albany, NY
November 5, 2026*; 7:00 p.m., ESPN+		at Manhattan; America East–Metro Basketball Challenge	W 72–68	2–0	23 – Jones	10 – Matulu	8 – Engen	Draddy Gymnasium (678); Riverdale, NY
November 8, 2026*; 2:00 p.m., ESPN+		Merrimack; America East–Metro Basketball Challenge	L 60–73	2–1	17 – Engen	8 – Graham	4 – Bussing	Broadview Center (1,557); Albany, NY
November 11, 2026*; 1:00 p.m., ESPN+		Dartmouth	L 76–85	2–2	18 – Engen	6 – 2 tied	8 – Jones	Broadview Center (1,656); Albany, NY
November 15, 2026*; 2:00 p.m., ESPN+		at Holy Cross	W 62–60	3–2	30 – Jones	14 – Fall	3 – 2 tied	Hart Center Arena (655); Worcester, MA
November 20, 2026*; 3:00 p.m., ESPN+		vs. Western Illinois; Queen City Classic						Koessler Athletic Center; Buffalo, NY
November 21, 2026*; 4:00 p.m., ESPN+		at Canisius; Queen City Classic						Kossler Athletic Center; Buffalo, NY
November 22, 2026*; 3:30 p.m., ESPN+		vs. Mercyhurst; Queen City Classic						Koessler Athletic Center; Buffalo, NY
November 25, 2026*; 6:00 p.m., ACCNX		at Syracuse						JMA Wireless Dome; Syracuse, NY
December 1, 2026*; 7:00 p.m., B1G+		at Penn State						Bryce Jordan Center; University Park, PA
December 5, 2026*; 7:00 p.m., ESPN+		Army						Broadview Center; Albany, NY
December 8, 2026*; 7:00 p.m., ESPN+		at Cornell						Newman Arena; Ithaca, NY
December 12, 2026*; 7:00 p.m., ESPN+		Siena; Albany Cup						Broadview Center; Albany, NY
December 16, 2026*; 7:00 p.m., ESPN+		at St. Bonaventure						Reilly Center; St. Bonaventure, NY
December 19, 2026*; 4:00 p.m., NBCSP/FloSports		at Drexel						Daskalakis Athletic Center; Philadelphia, PA
December 29, 2026*; 6:30 p.m., ESPN+		Columbia						Broadview Center; Albany, NY
America East Regular season
January 7, 2027; 6:30 p.m., ESPN+		Bryant						Broadview Center; Albany, NY
January 9, 2027; 4:00 p.m., ESPN+		Binghamton						Broadview Center; Albany, NY
January 14, 2027; 11:00 a.m., ESPN+		at NJIT						Wellness and Events Center; Newark, NJ
January 18, 2027; TBD, ESPN+		at UMBC						Chesapeake Employers Insurance Arena; Catonsville, MD
January 21, 2027; 6:30 p.m., ESPN+		New Hampshire						Broadview Center; Albany, NY
January 23, 2027; 2:00 p.m., ESPN+		Maine						Broadview Center; Albany, NY
January 28, 2027; TBD, ESPN+		at UMass Lowell						Kennedy Family Athletic Complex; Lowell, MA
January 30, 2027; 6:00 p.m., ESPN+		at Vermont						Patrick Gym; Burlington, VT
February 4, 2027; 6:30 p.m., ESPN+		NJIT						Broadview Center; Albany, NY
February 6, 2027; 7:00 p.m,, ESPN+		UMBC						Broadview Center; Albany, NY
February 11, 2027; 6:00 p.m., ESPN+		at Bryant						Chace Athletic Center; Smithfield, RI
February 13, 2027; 7:00 p.m., ESPN+		Vermont						Broadview Center; Albany, NY
February 17, 2027; 7:00 p.m., ESPN+		at Binghamton						Binghamton Events Center; Vestal, NY
February 25, 2027; 6:00 p.m., ESPN+		at New Hampshire						Lundholm Gym; Durham, NH
February 27, 2027; 2:00 p.m., ESPN+		at Maine						Memorial Gym; Orono, ME
March 2, 2027; 6:30 p.m., ESPN+		UMass Lowell; Senior Night						Broadview Center; Albany, NY
America East tournament
March 6, 9, 13, 2027; TBD, TBD		vs. TBD						TBD; TBD
*Non-conference game. ^{#}Rankings from AP poll. (#) Tournament seedings in parentheses. All times are in Eastern.
