= 2026–27 Maine Black Bears men's basketball team =

American college basketball season

2026–27 Maine Black Bears men's basketball
- Conference: America East Conference
- Record: 2–4 (0–0 America East)
- Head coach: Chris Markwood (5th season)
- Assistant coaches: Rob O'Driscoll; Pete Gash; Jordon Bronner; Tommy Freeman
- Home arena: Memorial Gymnasium

2026–27 America East Conference men's basketball standings
	Conf.				Overall
Team	W		L	PCT	W		L	PCT
UMass Lowell	0	–	0	–	4	–	1	.800
New Hampshire	0	–	0	–	4	–	2	.667
Albany	0	–	0	–	3	–	2	.600
Binghamton	0	–	0	–	3	–	3	.500
UMBC	0	–	0	–	3	–	3	.500
Vermont	0	–	0	–	2	–	3	.400
Bryant	0	–	0	–	2	–	4	.333
Maine	0	–	0	–	1	–	4	.200
NJIT	0	–	0	–	1	–	6	.143
† 2027 AmEast tournament winner As of November 20, 2026; Rankings from AP poll

The 2026–27 Maine Black Bears men's basketball team represents the University of Maine during the 2026–27 NCAA Division I men's basketball season. The Black Bears, led by fifth-year head coach Chris Markwood, play their home games at the Memorial Gymnasium on the University of Maine's campus in Orono, Maine as members of the America East Conference.

== Previous season ==
The Black Bears finished the 2025–26 season 8–24, 6–10 in America East play, to finish in sixth place. As the #6 seed in the America East tournament, they were defeated by #3 seed NJIT in the quarterfinals.

== Preseason ==
On September 28, 2026, the America East Conference released their preseason polls. Maine was picked to finish eighth in the conference.

=== Preseason rankings ===
America East Preseason Poll
Place	Team	Votes
1	Vermont	62 (7)
2	UMBC	46 (1)
3	Binghamton	45 (1)
4	NJIT	38
5	Bryant	36
6	Albany	34
7	UMass Lowell	31
8	Maine	19
9	New Hampshire	13
(#) first-place votes

=== Preseason All-America East Team ===
No players were named to the Preseason All-America East Team.

== Roster ==
2026–27 Maine Black Bears men's basketball team
Players
Coaches

Pos.	#	Name	Height	Weight	Year	Previous school	Hometown
G/F	1	Villiam Garcia Adsten	6 ft 8 in (2.03 m)	—	Sr	Drexel	Stockholm, Sweden
G	2	DeAndre Williams	6 ft 3 in (1.91 m)	195 lb (88 kg)	Sr	Holy Cross	Beacon, New York
G	3	Kaden Bedard	6 ft 1 in (1.85 m)	175 lb (79 kg)	Fr	The Newman School	New Gloucester, Maine
G	4	Caleb Crawford	6 ft 0 in (1.83 m)	172 lb (78 kg)	Jr	Loomis Chaffee School	Bronx, New York
F	5	Ayden Evans	6 ft 10 in (2.08 m)	205 lb (93 kg)	Jr	Ohio	Radcliff, Kentucky
F	6	Yanis Bamba	6 ft 6 in (1.98 m)	210 lb (95 kg)	Sr	Wichita State	Montreal, Quebec
G	8	Darius Lopes	6 ft 4 in (1.93 m)	167 lb (76 kg)	RS So	Vermont Academy	West Warwick, Rhode Island
F	10	Killian Gribben	6 ft 10 in (2.08 m)	222 lb (101 kg)	GS	Siena	Letterkenny, Ireland
F	11	Ace Flagg	6 ft 7 in (2.01 m)	205 lb (93 kg)	So	Greensboro Day School	Newport, Maine
F	12	Emmitt Byther	6 ft 6 in (1.98 m)	225 lb (102 kg)	So	Old Town High School	Old Town, Maine
F	13	Oliver Faubert	6 ft 9 in (2.06 m)	220 lb (100 kg)	RS So	Saint Mary's	Ottawa, Ontario
F	14	Wesley Waddles	6 ft 6 in (1.98 m)	185 lb (84 kg)	Fr	New Hampton School	Northridge, California
F	15	Wyatt Triestman	6 ft 6 in (1.98 m)	225 lb (102 kg)	Sr	Eckerd	East Irvington, New York
F	21	Joshua Ojuri	6 ft 6 in (1.98 m)	206 lb (93 kg)	RS Fr	Massanutten Military Academy	Providence, Rhode Island
G	23	Hudson Franz	6 ft 2 in (1.88 m)	—	Fr	Terra Verde Discovery School	Edmond, Oklahoma

Head coach

- Chris Markwood (Maine)

Assistant coach(es)

- Rob O'Driscoll (Villanova)
- Pete Gash (Chattanooga)
- Jordon Bronner (New Hampshire)
- Tommy Freeman (Ohio)

Legend

- (C) Team captain
- (S) Suspended
- (I) Ineligible
- (W) Walk-on
- Injured
- Current redshirt

Roster
Last update: October 19, 2026

== Schedule and results ==
Date time, TV	Rank^{#}	Opponent^{#}	Result	Record	High points	High rebounds	High assists	Site (attendance) city, state
Exhibition
October 25, 2026*; 4:30 pm		Husson	W 85–66		–	–	–	Memorial Gymnasium; Orono, ME
Non-conference regular season
November 2, 2026*; 7:00 pm, ESPN+		at Providence	L 56–83	0–1	13 – Franz	4 – Gribben	2 – Bamba	Amica Mutual Pavilion (11,685); Providence, RI
November 5, 2026*; 7:00 pm, ESPN+		at Sacred Heart; America East-Metro Challenge	W 74–72	1–1	16 – Williams	10 – Flagg	4 – Crawford/Franz	William H. Pitt Center (1,015); Fairfield, CT
November 8, 2026*; 1:00 pm, ESPN+		Manhattan; America East-Metro Challenge	L 62-68	1-2	16 – Garcia Adsten	10 – Garcia Adsten	4 – Garcia Adsten/Williams	Memorial Gymnasium (966); Orono, ME
November 10, 2026*; 7:00 pm		at Rhode Island	L 65-71	1-3	13 – Williams/Lopes	6 – Garcia Adsten	6 – Gribben	Ryan Center (2,797); Kingston, RI
November 14, 2026*; 1:00 pm, ESPN+		Drexel	L 64-66	1-4	14 – Pagonis	7 – Pagonis	7 – Pittman	Memorial Gymnasium (993); Orono, ME
November 19, 2026*; 7:00 pm		at Quinnipiac	W 69-67	2-4	–	–	–	M&T Bank Arena (624); Hamden, CT
November 21, 2026*; 6:00 pm		at UMass						Mullins Center; Amherst, MA
November 27, 2026*; 2:00 pm		vs. Le Moyne; Lafayette Classic						Kirby Sports Center; Easton, PA
November 28, 2026*; 4:30 pm		at Lafayette; Lafayette Classic						Kirby Sports Center; Easton, PA
November 29, 2026*; 12:00 pm		vs. Niagara; Lafayette Classic						Kirby Sports Center; Easton, PA
December 1, 2026*; 6:00 pm, ESPN+		UMaine Augusta						Memorial Gymnasium; Orono, ME
December 5, 2026*; 1:00 pm, ESPN+		Stony Brook						Memorial Gymnasium; Orono, ME
December 8, 2026*; 9:00 pm, truTV		at DePaul						Wintrust Arena; Chicago, IL
December 12, 2026*; 1:00 pm, ESPN+		Boston University						Memorial Gymnasium; Orono, ME
December 21, 2026*; 2:00 pm, ESPN+		Merrimack						Memorial Gymnasium; Orono, ME
December 29, 2026*; 6:00 pm		at Brown						Pizzitola Sports Center; Providence, RI
America East regular season
January 2, 2027; 4:00 pm		at Bryant						Chace Athletic Center; Smithfield, RI
January 7, 2027; 6:00 pm, ESPN+		NJIT						Memorial Gymnasium; Orono, ME
January 9, 2027; 12:30 pm, ESPN+		UMBC						Memorial Gymnasium; Orono, ME
January 18, 2027; 2:00 pm, ESPN+		UMass Lowell						Memorial Gymnasium; Orono, ME
January 21, 2027; 6:00 pm		at Binghamton						Events Center; Vestal, NY
January 23, 2027		at Albany						Broadview Center; Guilderland, NY
January 28, 2027; 6:00 pm, ESPN+		Vermont						Memorial Gymnasium; Orono, ME
January 30, 2027; 2:00 pm, ESPN+		New Hampshire						Memorial Gymnasium; Orono, ME
February 4, 2027; 6:00 pm		at UMass Lowell						Kennedy Family Athletic Complex; Lowell, MA
February 11, 2027; 6:00 pm		at UMBC						Chesapeake Employers Insurance Arena; Catonsville, MD
February 13, 2027; 4:00 pm		at NJIT						Wellness and Events Center; Newark, NJ
February 17, 2027; 6:00 pm, ESPN+		Bryant						Memorial Gymnasium; Orono, ME
February 20, 2027; 1:00 pm		at New Hampshire						Lundholm Gym; Durham, NH
February 25, 2027; 6:00 pm, ESPN+		Binghamton						Memorial Gymnasium; Orono, ME
February 27, 2027; 2:00 pm, ESPN+		Albany						Memorial Gymnasium; Orono, ME
March 2, 2027; 7:00 pm		at Vermont						Patrick Gym; Burlington, VT
*Non-conference game. ^{#}Rankings from AP poll. (#) Tournament seedings in parentheses. All times are in Eastern.
