= 2026–27 Binghamton Bearcats men's basketball team =

American college basketball season

2026–27 Binghamton Bearcats men's basketball
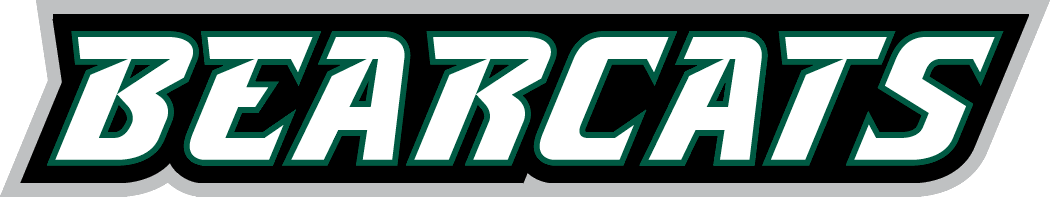
- Conference: America East Conference
- Record: 3-3 (0–0 America East)
- Head coach: Levell Sanders (6th season)
- Associate head coach: Brian Johnson
- Assistant coaches: Marlon Guild; Damani Myers
- Home arena: Visions Veterans Memorial Arena (non-conference); Events Center

2026–27 America East Conference men's basketball standings
	Conf.				Overall
Team	W		L	PCT	W		L	PCT
UMass Lowell	0	–	0	–	4	–	1	.800
Albany	0	–	0	–	3	–	2	.600
Binghamton	0	–	0	–	3	–	2	.600
New Hampshire	0	–	0	–	3	–	2	.600
UMBC	0	–	0	–	3	–	3	.500
Vermont	0	–	0	–	2	–	2	.500
Bryant	0	–	0	–	2	–	4	.333
Maine	0	–	0	–	1	–	4	.200
NJIT	0	–	0	–	1	–	5	.167
† 2027 AmEast tournament winner As of November 19, 2026; Rankings from AP poll

The 2026–27 Binghamton Bearcats men's basketball team will represent Binghamton University during the 2026–27 NCAA Division I men's basketball season. The Bearcats will be led by sixth-year head coach Levell Sanders. The Bearcats will play their four non-conference home games at the Visions Veterans Memorial Arena in Binghamton, New York, while their normal home arena, the Events Center in Vestal, New York, undergoes renovations, which is expected to be completed in time for conference play. They will compete as members of the America East Conference.

== Previous season ==
The Bearcats finished the 2024–25 season 8–23, 4–12 in America East play, to finish in ninth (last) place. They failed to qualify for the America East tournament.

== Preseason ==
On September 28, 2026, the America East Conference released their preseason polls. Binghamton was picked to finish third in the conference, receiving one out of a possible nine first-place votes.

=== Preseason rankings ===
America East Preseason Poll
Place	Team	Votes
1	Vermont	62 (7)
2	UMBC	46 (1)
3	Binghamton	45 (1)
4	NJIT	38
5	Bryant	36
6	Albany	34
7	UMass Lowell	31
8	Maine	19
9	New Hampshire	13
(#) first-place votes

=== Preseason All-America East Team ===
Preseason All-America East Team
Player	Year	Position
Demetrius Lilley	Senior	Center
Jeremiah Quigley	Senior	Guard

== Roster ==
2026–27 Binghamton Bearcats men's basketball team
Players
Coaches

Pos.	#	Name	Height	Weight	Year	Previous school	Hometown
G	0	Jeremiah Quigley	6 ft 0 in (1.83 m)	170 lb (77 kg)	Sr	George Mason	Accokeek, Maryland
G	1	Jayden Lemond	6 ft 4 in (1.93 m)	185 lb (84 kg)	Jr	William & Mary	Old Tappan, New Jersey
G	2	Jayden Kelsey	6 ft 7 in (2.01 m)	210 lb (95 kg)	So	Westtown School	Phoenixville, Pennsylvania
G	3	Evan Ashe	6 ft 3 in (1.91 m)	190 lb (86 kg)	Jr	The Winchendon School	Charlotte, North Carolina
G	4	Kofi Peyton	6 ft 4 in (1.93 m)	210 lb (95 kg)	So	Eastern Arizona College	West Seattle, Washington
G	5	Bobby Montgomery Jr.	6 ft 5 in (1.96 m)	200 lb (91 kg)	So	UTEP	Baltimore, Maryland
G	8	KiJan Robinson	6 ft 3 in (1.91 m)	175 lb (79 kg)	Sr	New Hampshire	Apopka, Florida
F	10	Dylan Godfrey	6 ft 8 in (2.03 m)	210 lb (95 kg)	Sr	UC Riverside	Newport Beach, California
G	11	Nevin Ibroci	6 ft 2 in (1.88 m)	180 lb (82 kg)	Jr	Oral Roberts	Staten Island, New York
F	13	Stephan Snagg	6 ft 8 in (2.03 m)	220 lb (100 kg)	Jr	New Hampton School	Queens, New York
C	14	Demetrius Lilley	6 ft 9 in (2.06 m)	220 lb (100 kg)	Sr	La Salle	Philadelphia, Pennsylvania
C	22	Joul Karram	6 ft 11 in (2.11 m)	240 lb (109 kg)	Jr	Utah Valley	Nazareth, Israel
G	24	Konstantin Popovic	6 ft 5 in (1.96 m)	200 lb (91 kg)	Jr	Coffeyville Community College	Čačak, Serbia
G	30	Jake Blackburn	6 ft 5 in (1.96 m)	200 lb (91 kg)	So	Worcester Academy	Southborough, Massachusetts
F	33	Sayerr Senghore	6 ft 8 in (2.03 m)	205 lb (93 kg)	Sr	Fort Valley State	Woodinville, Washington

Head coach

- Levell Sanders (Seton Hall)

Assistant coach(es)

- Brian Johnson (Delaware)
- Marlon Guild (Hartford)
- Damani Myers (Saint Peter's)

Legend

- (C) Team captain
- (S) Suspended
- (I) Ineligible
- (W) Walk-on
- Injured
- Current redshirt

Roster
Last update: October 13, 2026

== Schedule and results ==
Date time, TV	Rank^{#}	Opponent^{#}	Result	Record	Site (attendance) city, state
Non-conference regular season
November 2, 2026*; 8:00 pm, B1G+		at Northwestern	L 60–86	0–1	Welsh–Ryan Arena (3,684); Evanston, IL
November 5, 2026*; 7:00 pm, ESPN+		at Saint Peter's; America East-Metro Challenge	W 58–55	1–1	Run Baby Run Arena (249); Jersey City, NJ
November 8, 2026*; 4:00 pm, ESPN+		Rider; America East-Metro Challenge	W 75-63	2-1	Visions Veterans Memorial Arena (1,276); Binghamton, NY
November 11, 2026*; 7:30 pm, MACtv		at Misericordia	W 87-62	3-1	Anderson Center (200); Dallas, PA
November 14, 2026*; 7:30 p.m.		at Duquesne	L 58-71	3-2	UPMC Cooper Fieldhouse (2,411); Pittsburgh, PA
November 18, 2026*; 7:00 pm		at Lafayette	L 65-80	3-3	Kirby Sports Center (1,164); Easton, PA
November 21, 2026*; 3:30 pm, ESPN+		Army			Visions Veterans Memorial Arena; Binghamton, NY
November 24, 2026*; 7:00 pm		at Lehigh			Stabler Arena; Bethlehem, PA
November 30, 2026*; 7:00 pm		at Fairleigh Dickinson			Bogota Savings Bank Center; Hackensack, NJ
December 3, 2026*; 7:00 pm		at Le Moyne			Ted Grant Court; DeWitt, NY
December 5, 2026*; 3:30 pm		Alfred State			Visions Veterans Memorial Arena; Binghamton, NY
December 8, 2026*; 7:30 pm		at Delaware State			Memorial Hall; Dover, DE
December 18, 2026*; 6:30 pm		at Niagara			Gallagher Center; Lewiston, NY
December 22, 2026*; 4:00 pm, ACCN		at Syracuse			JMA Wireless Dome; Syracuse, NY
December 29, 2026*; 6:07 pm		Marywood			Visions Veterans Memorial Arena; Binghamton, NY
America East regular season
January 2, 2027; 2:00 pm		Vermont			Events Center; Vestal, NY
January 9, 2027; 4:00 p.m.		at Albany			Broadview Center; Guilderland, NY
January 14, 2027; 6:00 pm		at UMass Lowell			Kennedy Family Athletic Complex; Lowell, MA
January 18, 2027; 2:00 pm		at NJIT			Wellness and Events Center; Newark, NJ
January 21, 2027; 6:07 pm		Maine			Events Center; Vestal, NY
January 23, 2027; 2:00 pm, MSG		New Hampshire			Events Center; Vestal, NY
January 28, 2027; 6:07 pm		UMBC			Events Center; Vestal, NY
January 30, 2027; 4:00 pm		at Bryant			Chace Athletic Center; Smithfield, RI
February 6, 2027; 2:00 pm, MSG		NJIT			Events Center; Vestal, NY
February 11, 2027; 6:00 pm		at Vermont			Patrick Gym; Burlington, VT
February 13, 2027; 2:00 pm, MSG		UMass Lowell			Events Center; Vestal, NY
February 17, 2027; 7:00 pm, MSGSN		Albany			Events Center; Vestal, NY
February 20, 2027; 2:00 pm		Bryant			Events Center; Vestal, NY
February 25, 2027; 6:00 pm		at Maine			Memorial Gymnasium; Orono, ME
February 27, 2027; 12:00 pm		at New Hampshire			Lundholm Gym; Durham, NH
March 2, 2027; 6:00 pm		at UMBC			Chesapeake Employers Insurance Arena; Catonsville, MD
*Non-conference game. ^{#}Rankings from AP poll. (#) Tournament seedings in parentheses. All times are in Eastern.
