= 2026–27 Vermont Catamounts men's basketball team =

American college basketball season

2026–27 Vermont Catamounts men's basketball
- Conference: America East Conference
- Record: 2-3 (0–0 America East)
- Head coach: John Becker (16th season)
- Associate head coach: Ryan Schneider
- Assistant coaches: Nathan Johnson; Derryk O'Grady; Braeden Estes
- Home arena: Patrick Gym

2026–27 America East Conference men's basketball standings
	Conf.				Overall
Team	W		L	PCT	W		L	PCT
UMass Lowell	0	–	0	–	4	–	1	.800
Albany	0	–	0	–	3	–	2	.600
Binghamton	0	–	0	–	3	–	2	.600
New Hampshire	0	–	0	–	3	–	2	.600
UMBC	0	–	0	–	3	–	3	.500
Vermont	0	–	0	–	2	–	2	.500
Bryant	0	–	0	–	2	–	4	.333
Maine	0	–	0	–	1	–	4	.200
NJIT	0	–	0	–	1	–	5	.167
† 2027 AmEast tournament winner As of November 19, 2026; Rankings from AP poll

The 2026–27 Vermont Catamounts men's basketball team will represent the University of Vermont during the 2026–27 NCAA Division I men's basketball season. The Catamounts, who will be led by 16th-year head coach John Becker, will play their home games at the Patrick Gym in Burlington, Vermont as members of the America East Conference.

== Previous season ==
The Catamounts finished the 2025–26 season 22–12, 12–4 in America East play, to finish in second place. As the #2 seed in the America East tournament, they defeated #7 seed Bryant in the quarterfinals, and #3 seed NJIT in the semifinals, before falling to top-seeded UMBC in the championship game.

== Preseason ==
On September 28, 2026, the America East Conference released their preseason polls. Vermont was picked to finish as America East Conference champions, receiving seven out of a possible nine first-place votes.

=== Preseason rankings ===
America East Preseason Poll
Place	Team	Votes
1	Vermont	62 (7)
2	UMBC	46 (1)
3	Binghamton	45 (1)
4	NJIT	38
5	Bryant	36
6	Albany	34
7	UMass Lowell	31
8	Maine	19
9	New Hampshire	13
(#) first-place votes

=== Preseason All-America East Team ===
Preseason All-America East Team
Player	Year	Position
Gus Yalden	Junior	Forward

== Roster ==
2026–27 Vermont Catamounts men's basketball team
Players
Coaches

Pos.	#	Name	Height	Weight	Year	Previous school	Hometown
G	0	Cash Chism	6 ft 2 in (1.88 m)	175 lb (79 kg)	Fr	Mount Pleasant High School	Mount Pleasant, Texas
G	1	Momo Nkugwa	6 ft 3 in (1.91 m)	185 lb (84 kg)	So	The Governor's Academy	Chelmsford, Massachusetts
F	2	Marko Masic	6 ft 9 in (2.06 m)	205 lb (93 kg)	Fr	Porsche BBA Ludwigsburg	Ludwigsburg, Germany
G	3	Darrel Yepdo	6 ft 0 in (1.83 m)	175 lb (79 kg)	Sr	UMass Lowell	Dracut, Massachusetts
G	4	Khalil Badru	6 ft 4 in (1.93 m)	200 lb (91 kg)	Jr	Iona	New Britain, Connecticut
G	5	John Broom	6 ft 5 in (1.96 m)	185 lb (84 kg)	RS Jr	South Alabama	Jacksonville, Alabama
G	12	Will Davies	6 ft 5 in (1.96 m)	195 lb (88 kg)	Jr	Saint Anselm	Saco, Maine
G	13	Sincere Clemons	6 ft 2 in (1.88 m)	185 lb (84 kg)	RS So	Northfield Mount Hermon School	Ithaca, New York
G	14	Zach Romich	6 ft 2 in (1.88 m)	190 lb (86 kg)	Fr	Kimball Union Academy	Groton, Massachusetts
G	15	Hayden Johns	6 ft 5 in (1.96 m)	210 lb (95 kg)	RS Fr	Saint Anselm	Cambridge, Ontario
F	19	Gus Yalden	6 ft 9 in (2.06 m)	270 lb (122 kg)	RS Jr	Seton Hall	Appleton, Wisconsin
F	21	Mario Brunetto	6 ft 11 in (2.11 m)	190 lb (86 kg)	RS So	Arizona Western College	La Spezia, Italy
F	24	Sublime Gbiegba	6 ft 8 in (2.03 m)	220 lb (100 kg)	Fr	Cholet Basket	Toulouse, France
F	34	Noah Barnett	6 ft 9 in (2.06 m)	220 lb (100 kg)	RS Jr	Don Bosco Prep	Poughkeepsie, New York
G	55	Daniil Glazkov	6 ft 6 in (1.98 m)	215 lb (98 kg)	Jr	Loyola Chicago	Maykop, Russia

Head coach

- John Becker (Catholic)

Assistant coach(es)

- Ryan Schneider (Marist)
- Nathan Johnson (St. Francis Xavier)
- Derryk O'Grady (Vermont)
- Braeden Estes (New Hampshire)

Legend

- (C) Team captain
- (S) Suspended
- (I) Ineligible
- (W) Walk-on
- Injured
- Current redshirt

Roster
Last update: October 24, 2026

== Schedule and results ==
Date time, TV	Rank^{#}	Opponent^{#}	Result	Record	Site (attendance) city, state
Exhibition
October 17, 2026*; 4:00 pm		Holy Cross	W 90–80	–	Patrick Gym; Burlington, VT
October 24, 2026*; 2:00 pm		Stonehill	W 77–61	–	Patrick Gym; Burlington, VT
October 28, 2026*; 7:30 pm		Saint Michael's	W 76–69	–	Patrick Gym; Burlington, VT
Non-conference regular season
November 2, 2026*; 7:00 pm, ESPN+		at Iona	L 55–56	0–1	Hynes Athletics Center (1,656); New Rochelle, NY
November 5, 2026*; 7:00 pm, ESPN+		at Fairfield; America East-Metro Basketball Challenge	W 79–67	1–1	Leo D. Mahoney Arena (2,520); Fairfield, CT
November 8, 2026*; 2:00 pm, ESPN+		Quinnipiac; America East-Metro Basketball Challenge	L 76-79	1-2	Patrick Gym (1,934); Burlington, VT
November 14, 2026*; 1:00 pm, ESPN+		Plattsburgh State	W 104-59	2-2	Patrick Gym (1,911); Burlington, VT
November 18, 2026*; 7:00 pm, ESPN+		at Yale	L 74-76	2-3	John J. Lee Amphitheater (745); New Haven, CT
November 21, 2026*; 7:00 pm, ESPN+		Brown			Patrick Gym; Burlington, VT
November 24, 2026*; 7:00 pm, ESPN+		at Siena			MVP Arena; Albany, NY
November 27, 2026*; 1:00 pm, FloCollege		vs. Merrimack; Hofstra MTE			Mack Sports Complex; Hempstead, NY
November 28, 2026*; 1:00 pm, FloCollege		vs. Colgate; Hofstra MTE			Mack Sports Complex; Hempstead, NY
November 29, 2026*; 2:30 pm, FloCollege		at Hofstra; Hofstra MTE			Mack Sports Complex; Hempstead, NY
December 3, 2026*; 6:00 pm, ESPN+		Princeton			Patrick Gym; Burlington, VT
December 6, 2026*; 12:00 pm, SECN		at Florida			O'Connell Center; Gainesville, FL
December 10, 2026*; 7:00 pm		at Merrimack			Lawler Arena; North Andover, MA
December 13, 2026*; 4:00 pm, ESPN+		Northeastern			Patrick Gym; Burlington, VT
December 20, 2026*; 2:00 pm		at Robert Morris			UPMC Events Center; Moon Township, PA
December 29, 2026*; 7:00 pm, ESPN+		Western New England			Patrick Gym; Burlington, VT
America East regular season
January 2, 2027; 2:00 pm		at Binghamton			Events Center; Vestal, NY
January 7, 2027; 7:00 pm, ESPN+		UMass Lowell			Patrick Gym; Burlington, VT
January 14, 2027; 6:00 pm		at New Hampshire			Lundholm Gym; Durham, NH
January 18, 2027; 2:00 pm, ESPN+		Bryant			Patrick Gym; Burlington, VT
January 21, 2027; 6:00 pm		at UMBC			Chesapeake Employers Insurance Arena; Catonsville, MD
January 23, 2027; 4:00 pm		at NJIT			Wellness and Events Center; Newark, NJ
January 28, 2027; 6:00 pm		at Maine			Memorial Gymnasium; Orono, ME
January 30, 2027; 6:00 pm, ESPN+		Albany			Patrick Gym; Burlington, VT
February 4, 2027; 7:00 pm, ESPN+		New Hampshire			Patrick Gym; Burlington, VT
February 6, 2027; 4:00 pm		at Bryant			Chace Athletic Center; Smithfield, RI
February 11, 2027; 6:00 pm, ESPN+		Binghamton			Patrick Gym; Burlington, VT
February 13, 2027; ESPN+		at Albany			Broadview Center; Guilderland, NY
February 18, 2027; 7:00 pm, ESPN+		UMBC			Patrick Gym; Burlington, VT
February 20, 2027; 3:00 pm, ESPN+		NJIT			Patrick Gym; Burlington, VT
February 27, 2026; 5:00 pm		at UMass Lowell			Tsongas Center; Lowell, MA
March 2, 2027; 7:00 pm, ESPN+		Maine			Patrick Gym; Burlington, VT
*Non-conference game. ^{#}Rankings from AP poll. (#) Tournament seedings in parentheses. All times are in Eastern.
