= List of current NCAA Division I men's basketball coaches =

As of the most recently completed 2025–26 basketball season, 366 men's college basketball programs competed in the National Collegiate Athletic Association's Division I. This number includes programs transitioning from a lower NCAA division, all from Division II, and Saint Francis (PA), transitioning to Division III. For the 2026–27 season, one school became a full Division I member, having completed its transition from Division II, while another school started a transition from Division II.

Each program employs a head coach. As of the 2026–27 season, the longest-tenured head coach is Greg Kampe, who has been head coach at Oakland since 1984. However, Kampe does not have the longest tenure at the Division I level because Oakland played in NCAA Division II before the 1997–98 season. The longest tenure at the D-I level is that of Tom Izzo of Michigan State, who has coached the Spartans since 1995–96.

Conference affiliations reflect those in place for the 2026–27 college basketball season.

Team	Conference	Current coach	Since
Abilene Christian Wildcats	United Athletic	Brette Tanner	2021–22
Air Force Falcons	Mountain West	Joe Crispin	2026–27
Akron Zips	Mid-American	Dustin Ford	2026–27
Alabama Crimson Tide	Southeastern	Nate Oats	2019–20
Alabama A&M Bulldogs	Southwestern	Donte Jackson	2025–26
Alabama State Hornets	Southwestern	Chris Wright	2026–27
Albany Great Danes	America East	Dwayne Killings	2021–22
Alcorn State Braves	Southwestern	Jake Morton	2025–26
American Eagles	Patriot League	Duane Simpkins	2023–24
Appalachian State Mountaineers	Sun Belt	Dustin Kerns	2019–20
Arizona Wildcats	Big 12	Tommy Lloyd	2021–22
Arizona State Sun Devils	Big 12	Randy Bennett	2026–27
Arkansas Razorbacks	Southeastern	John Calipari	2024–25
Arkansas–Pine Bluff Golden Lions	Southwestern	Solomon Bozeman	2021–22
Arkansas State Red Wolves	Sun Belt	Ryan Pannone	2025–26
Army Black Knights	Patriot League	Kevin Kuwik	2023–24
Auburn Tigers	Southeastern	Steven Pearl	2025–26
Austin Peay Governors	United Athletic	Corey Gipson	2023–24
Ball State Cardinals	Mid-American	Chris Capko	2026–27
Baylor Bears	Big 12	Scott Drew	2003–04
Bellarmine Knights	Atlantic Sun	Doug Davenport	2025–26
Belmont Bruins	Missouri Valley	Evan Bradds	2026–27
Bethune-Cookman Wildcats	Southwestern	Reggie Theus	2021–22
Binghamton Bearcats	America East	Levell Sanders	2021–22
Boise State Broncos	Pac-12	Leon Rice	2010–11
Boston College Eagles	Atlantic Coast	Luke Murray	2026–27
Boston University Terriers	Patriot League	Joe Jones	2011–12
Bowling Green Falcons	Mid-American	Todd Simon	2023–24
Bradley Braves	Missouri Valley	Brian Wardle	2015–16
Brown Bears	Ivy League	Eric Reveno	2026–27
Bryant Bulldogs	America East	Jamion Christian	2025–26
Bucknell Bison	Patriot League	John Griffin III	2023–24
Buffalo Bulls	Mid-American	George Halcovage	2023–24
Butler Bulldogs	Big East	Ronald Nored	2026–27
BYU Cougars	Big 12	Kevin Young	2024–25
Cal Poly Mustangs	Big West	Mike DeGeorge	2024–25
Cal State Bakersfield Roadrunners	Big West	Todd Lee	2026–27
Cal State Fullerton Titans	Big West	Dedrique Taylor	2013–14
Cal State Northridge Matadors	Big West	Andy Newman	2023–24
California Golden Bears	Atlantic Coast	Mark Madsen	2023–24
California Baptist Lancers	Big West	Kyle Getter	2026–27
Campbell Fighting Camels	Coastal	Jimmie Williams	2026–27
Canisius Golden Griffins	Metro	Jim Christian	2024–25
Central Arkansas Bears	United Athletic	John Shulman	2024–25
Central Connecticut Blue Devils	NEC	Patrick Sellers	2021–22
Central Michigan Chippewas	Mid-American	Andy Bronkema	2025–26
Charleston Cougars	Coastal	John Groce	2026–27
Charleston Southern Buccaneers	Big South	Saah Nimley	2023–24
Charlotte 49ers	American	Wes Miller	2026–27
Chattanooga Mocs	Southern	Dan Earl	2022–23
Chicago State Cougars	NEC	Landon Bussie	2025–26
Cincinnati Bearcats	Big 12	Jerrod Calhoun	2026–27
The Citadel Bulldogs	Southern	Ed Conroy	2022–23 (Note: This is Conroy's second stint at The Citadel; he had served there from 2006–2010.)
Clemson Tigers	Atlantic Coast	Brad Brownell	2010–11
Cleveland State Vikings	Horizon League	Rob Summers	2025–26
Coastal Carolina Chanticleers	Sun Belt	Justin Gray	2024–25
Colgate Raiders	Patriot League	Matt Langel	2011–12
Colorado Buffaloes	Big 12	Tad Boyle	2010–11
Colorado State Rams	Pac-12	Ali Farokhmanesh	2025–26
Columbia Lions	Ivy League	Kevin Hovde	2025–26
Coppin State Eagles	Mid-Eastern	Larry Stewart	2023–24
Cornell Big Red	Ivy League	Jon Jaques	2024–25
Creighton Bluejays	Big East	Alan Huss	2026–27
Dartmouth Big Green	Ivy League	Brett MacConnell	2026–27
Davidson Wildcats	Atlantic 10	Matt McKillop	2022–23
Dayton Flyers	Atlantic 10	Anthony Grant	2017–18
Delaware Fightin' Blue Hens	Conference USA	Martin Ingelsby	2016–17
Delaware State Hornets	Mid-Eastern	Stan Waterman	2021–22
Denver Pioneers	West Coast	Tim Bergstraser	2025–26
DePaul Blue Demons	Big East	Chris Holtmann	2024–25
Detroit Mercy Titans	Horizon League	Mark Montgomery	2024–25
Drake Bulldogs	Missouri Valley	Eric Henderson	2025–26
Drexel Dragons	Coastal	Zach Spiker	2016–17
Duke Blue Devils	Atlantic Coast	Jon Scheyer	2022–23
Duquesne Dukes	Atlantic 10	Dru Joyce III	2024–25
East Carolina Pirates	American	Michael Schwartz	2022–23
East Tennessee State Buccaneers	Southern	Brooks Savage	2023–24
East Texas A&M Lions	Southland	Jaret von Rosenberg	2017–18
Eastern Illinois Panthers	Ohio Valley	Marty Simmons	2021–22
Eastern Kentucky Colonels	United Athletic	A. W. Hamilton	2018–19
Eastern Michigan Eagles	Mid-American	Billy Donlon	2026–27
Eastern Washington Eagles	Big Sky	Dan Monson	2024–25
Elon Phoenix	Coastal	Billy Taylor	2022–23
Evansville Purple Aces	Missouri Valley	David Ragland	2022–23
Fairfield Stags	Metro	Chris Casey	2023–24
Fairleigh Dickinson Knights	NEC	Jack Castleberry	2023–24
FIU Panthers	Conference USA	Joey Cantens	2026–27
Florida Gators	Southeastern	Todd Golden	2022–23
Florida A&M Rattlers	Southwestern	Charlie Ward	2025–26
Florida Atlantic Owls	American	John Jakus	2024–25
Florida Gulf Coast Eagles	Atlantic Sun	Pat Chambers	2022–23
Florida State Seminoles	Atlantic Coast	Luke Loucks	2025–26
Fordham Rams	Atlantic 10	Mike Magpayo	2025–26
Fresno State Bulldogs	Pac-12	Vance Walberg	2024–25
Furman Paladins	Southern	Bob Richey	2017–18
Gardner–Webb Runnin' Bulldogs	Big South	Jeremy Luther	2024–25
George Mason Patriots	Atlantic 10	Tony Skinn	2023−24
George Washington Revolutionaries	Atlantic 10	Chris Caputo	2022–23
Georgetown Hoyas	Big East	Ed Cooley	2023–24
Georgia Bulldogs	Southeastern	Mike White	2022–23
Georgia Southern Eagles	Sun Belt	Charlie Henry	2023–24
Georgia State Panthers	Sun Belt	Jon Cremins	2026–27
Georgia Tech Yellow Jackets	Atlantic Coast	Scott Cross	2026–27
Gonzaga Bulldogs	Pac-12	Mark Few	1999–2000
Grambling State Tigers	Southwestern	Patrick Crarey II	2025–26
Grand Canyon Antelopes	Mountain West	Bryce Drew	2020–21
Green Bay Phoenix	Horizon League	Doug Gottlieb	2024–25
Hampton Pirates	Coastal	Ivan Thomas	2024–25
Harvard Crimson	Ivy League	Tommy Amaker	2007–08
Hawaii Rainbow Warriors	Mountain West	Eran Ganot	2015–16
High Point Panthers	Big South	Flynn Clayman	2025–26
Hofstra Pride	Coastal	Speedy Claxton	2021–22
Holy Cross Crusaders	Patriot League	Dave Paulsen	2023–24
Houston Cougars	Big 12	Kelvin Sampson	2014–15
Houston Christian Huskies	Southland	Craig Doty	2024–25
Howard Bison	Mid-Eastern	Kenny Blakeney	2019–20
Idaho Vandals	Big Sky	Alex Pribble	2023–24
Idaho State Bengals	Big Sky	Ryan Looney	2019–20
Illinois Fighting Illini	Big Ten	Brad Underwood	2017–18
Illinois State Redbirds	Missouri Valley	Ryan Pedon	2022–23
Incarnate Word Cardinals	Southland	Shane Heirman	2023–24
Indiana Hoosiers	Big Ten	Darian DeVries	2025–26
Indiana State Sycamores	Missouri Valley	Matthew Graves	2024–25
Iona Gaels	Metro	Dan Geriot	2025–26
Iowa Hawkeyes	Big Ten	Ben McCollum	2025–26
Iowa State Cyclones	Big 12	T. J. Otzelberger	2021–22
IU Indy Jaguars (Note: Following the dissolution of Indiana University–Purdue University Indianapolis at the end of the 2023–24 school year, the IUPUI athletic program transferred to the new Indiana University Indianapolis. The athletic program's official website has already transitioned to an "IU Indy" branding.)	Horizon League	Ben Howlett	2025–26
Jackson State Tigers	Southwestern	Trey Johnson	2026–27
Jacksonville Dolphins	Atlantic Sun	Jordan Mincy	2021–22
Jacksonville State Gamecocks	Conference USA	Ray Harper	2016–17
James Madison Dukes	Sun Belt	Preston Spradlin	2024–25
Kansas Jayhawks	Big 12	Bill Self	2003–04
Kansas City Roos	Summit League	Mark Turgeon	2026–27
Kansas State Wildcats	Big 12	Casey Alexander	2026–27
Kennesaw State Owls	Conference USA	Antoine Pettway	2023–24
Kent State Golden Flashes	Mid-American	Rob Senderoff	2011–12
Kentucky Wildcats	Southeastern	Mark Pope	2024–25
La Salle Explorers	Atlantic 10	Darris Nichols	2025–26
Lafayette Leopards	Patriot League	Mike McGarvey	2022–23
Lamar Cardinals	Southland	Jordan Fee	2026–27
Le Moyne Dolphins	NEC	Nate Champion	2019–20
Lehigh Mountain Hawks	Patriot League	Brett Reed	2007–08
Liberty Flames	Conference USA	Ritchie McKay	2015–16 (Note: This is McKay's second stint at Liberty; he had served there from 2007–2009.)
Lindenwood Lions	Ohio Valley	Kyle Gerdeman	2019–20
Lipscomb Bisons	Atlantic Sun	Kevin Carroll	2025–26
Little Rock Trojans	United Athletic	Travis Ford	2026–27
LIU Sharks	NEC	Rod Strickland	2022–23
Long Beach State Beach	Big West	Chris Acker	2024–25
Longwood Lancers	Big South	Ronnie Thomas	2025–26
Louisiana Ragin' Cajuns	Sun Belt	Quannas White	2025–26
Louisiana–Monroe Warhawks	Sun Belt	Ryan Cross	2026–27
Louisiana Tech Bulldogs	Sun Belt	Talvin Hester	2022–23
Louisville Cardinals	Atlantic Coast	Pat Kelsey	2024–25
Loyola Chicago Ramblers	Atlantic 10	Drew Valentine	2021–22
Loyola (Maryland) Greyhounds	Patriot League	Josh Loeffler	2024–25
Loyola Marymount Lions	West Coast	Stan Johnson	2020–21
LSU Tigers	Southeastern	Will Wade	2026–27 (Note: This is Wade's second stint at LSU; he had served there from 2017–2022.)
LSU New Orleans Privateers	Southland	Stacy Hollowell	2024–25
Maine Black Bears	America East	Chris Markwood	2022–23
Manhattan Jaspers	Metro	John Gallagher	2023–24
Marist Red Foxes	Metro	John Dunne	2018–19
Marquette Golden Eagles	Big East	Shaka Smart	2021–22
Marshall Thundering Herd	Sun Belt	Cornelius Jackson	2024–25
Maryland Terrapins	Big Ten	Buzz Williams	2025–26
Maryland Eastern Shore Hawks	Mid-Eastern	Cleo Hill Jr.	2024–25
McNeese Cowboys	Southland	Bill Armstrong	2025–26
Memphis Tigers	American	Penny Hardaway	2018–19
Mercer Bears	Southern	Ryan Ridder	2024–25
Mercyhurst Lakers	NEC	Gary Manchel	2003–04
Merrimack Warriors	Metro	Joe Gallo	2016–17
Miami Hurricanes	Atlantic Coast	Jai Lucas	2025–26
Miami RedHawks	Mid-American	Travis Steele	2022–23
Michigan Wolverines	Big Ten	Mike Boynton	2026–27
Michigan State Spartans	Big Ten	Tom Izzo	1995–96
Middle Tennessee Blue Raiders	Conference USA	Nick McDevitt	2018–19
Milwaukee Panthers	Horizon League	Bart Lundy	2022–23
Minnesota Golden Gophers	Big Ten	Niko Medved	2025–26
Mississippi State Bulldogs	Southeastern	Chris Jans	2022–23
Mississippi Valley State Delta Devils	Southwestern	Mike Davis	2026–27
Missouri Tigers	Southeastern	Dennis Gates	2022–23
Missouri State Bears	Conference USA	Cuonzo Martin	2024–25 (Note: This is Martin's second stint at Missouri State; he had served there from 2008–2011.)
Monmouth Hawks	Coastal	King Rice	2011–12
Montana Grizzlies	Big Sky	Travis DeCuire	2014–15
Montana State Bobcats	Big Sky	Matt Logie	2023–24
Morehead State Eagles	Ohio Valley	Jonathan Mattox	2024–25
Morgan State Bears	Mid-Eastern	Kevin Broadus	2019–20
Mount St. Mary's Mountaineers	Metro	Donny Lind	2024–25
Murray State Racers	Missouri Valley	Ryan Miller	2025–26
Navy Midshipmen	Patriot League	Jon Perry	2025–26
NC State Wolfpack	Atlantic Coast	Justin Gainey	2026–27
Nebraska Cornhuskers	Big Ten	Fred Hoiberg	2019–20
Nevada Wolf Pack	Mountain West	Steve Alford	2019–20
New Hampshire Wildcats	America East	Nathan Davis	2023–24
New Haven Chargers	NEC	Ted Hotaling	2010–11
New Mexico Lobos	Mountain West	Eric Olen	2025–26
New Mexico State Aggies	Conference USA	Jason Hooten	2023–24
Niagara Purple Eagles	Metro	Greg Paulus	2019–20
Nicholls Colonels	Southland	Darion Brown	2026–27
NJIT Highlanders	America East	Grant Billmeier	2023–24
Norfolk State Spartans	Mid-Eastern	Robert Jones	2013–14
North Alabama Lions	United Athletic	Tony Pujol	2018–19
North Carolina Tar Heels	Atlantic Coast	Michael Malone	2026–27
North Carolina A&T Aggies	Coastal	Monté Ross	2023–24
North Carolina Central Eagles	Mid-Eastern	LeVelle Moton	2009–10
North Dakota Fighting Hawks	Summit League	Paul Sather	2019–20
North Dakota State Bison	Summit League	David Richman	2014–15
North Florida Ospreys	Atlantic Sun	Bobby Kennen	2025–26
North Texas Mean Green	American	Daniyal Robinson	2025–26
Northeastern Huskies	Coastal	Bill Coen	2006–07
Northern Arizona Lumberjacks	Big Sky	Shane Burcar	2019–20
Northern Colorado Bears	Big Sky	Steve Smiley	2020–21
Northern Illinois Huskies	Horizon League	Matt Majkrzak	2026–27
Northern Iowa Panthers	Missouri Valley	Kyle Green	2026–27
Northern Kentucky Norse	Horizon League	Darrin Horn	2019–20
Northwestern Wildcats	Big Ten	Chris Collins	2013–14
Northwestern State Demons	Southland	Rick Cabrera	2023–24
Notre Dame Fighting Irish	Atlantic Coast	Micah Shrewsberry	2023–24
Oakland Golden Grizzlies	Horizon League	Greg Kampe	1984–85
Ohio Bobcats	Mid-American	Jeff Boals	2019–20
Ohio State Buckeyes	Big Ten	Jake Diebler	2023–24
Oklahoma Sooners	Southeastern	Porter Moser	2021–22
Oklahoma State Cowboys	Big 12	Steve Lutz	2024–25
Old Dominion Monarchs	Sun Belt	Mike Jones	2024–25
Ole Miss Rebels	Southeastern	Chris Beard	2023–24
Omaha Mavericks	Summit League	Chris Crutchfield	2022–23
Oral Roberts Golden Eagles	Summit League	Kory Barnett	2025–26
Oregon Ducks	Big Ten	Dana Altman	2010–11
Oregon State Beavers	Pac-12	Justin Joyner	2026–27
Pacific Tigers	West Coast	Dave Smart	2024–25
Penn Quakers	Ivy League	Fran McCaffery	2025–26
Penn State Nittany Lions	Big Ten	Mike Rhoades	2023–24
Pepperdine Waves	West Coast	Griff Aldrich	2026–27
Pittsburgh Panthers	Atlantic Coast	Jeff Capel III	2018–19
Portland Pilots	West Coast	Shantay Legans	2021–22
Portland State Vikings	Big Sky	Jase Coburn	2021–22
Prairie View A&M Panthers	Southwestern	Byron Smith	2015–16
Presbyterian Blue Hose	Big South	Quinton Ferrell	2019–20
Princeton Tigers	Ivy League	Mitch Henderson	2011–12
Providence Friars	Big East	Bryan Hodgson	2026–27
Purdue Boilermakers	Big Ten	Matt Painter	2005–06
Purdue Fort Wayne Mastodons	Horizon League	Jon Coffman	2014–15
Queens Royals	Atlantic Sun	Grant Leonard	2022–23
Quinnipiac Bobcats	Metro	Tom Pecora	2023–24
Radford Highlanders	Big South	Zach Chu	2025–26
Rhode Island Rams	Atlantic 10	Archie Miller	2022–23
Rice Owls	American	Rob Lanier	2024–25
Richmond Spiders	Atlantic 10	Chris Mooney	2005–06
Rider Broncs	Metro	Kevin Baggett	2012–13
Robert Morris Colonials	Horizon League	Andrew Toole	2010–11
Rutgers Scarlet Knights	Big Ten	Steve Pikiell	2016–17
Sacramento State Hornets	Big West	Mike Bibby	2025–26
Sacred Heart Pioneers	Metro	Anthony Latina	2013–14
St. Bonaventure Bonnies	Atlantic 10	Mike MacDonald	2026–27
St. John's Red Storm	Big East	Rick Pitino	2023–24
Saint Joseph's Hawks	Atlantic 10	Steve Donahue	2025–26
Saint Louis Billikens	Atlantic 10	Josh Schertz	2024–25
Saint Mary's Gaels	West Coast	Mickey McConnell	2026–27
Saint Peter's Peacocks	Metro	Bashir Mason	2022–23
St. Thomas Tommies	Summit League	John Tauer	2011–12
Sam Houston Bearkats	Conference USA	Chris Mudge	2023–24
Samford Bulldogs	Southern	Lennie Acuff	2025–26
San Diego Toreros	West Coast	JR Blount	2026–27
San Diego State Aztecs	Pac-12	Brian Dutcher	2017–18
San Francisco Dons	West Coast	Chris Gerlufsen	2022–23
San Jose State Spartans	Mountain West	Tim Miles	2021–22
Santa Clara Broncos	West Coast	Herb Sendek	2016–17
Seattle Redhawks	West Coast	Chris Victor	2021–22
Seton Hall Pirates	Big East	Shaheen Holloway	2022–23
Siena Saints	Metro	Nevada Smith	2026–27
SIU Edwardsville Cougars	Ohio Valley	Brian Barone	2019–20
SMU Mustangs	Atlantic Coast	Andy Enfield	2024–25
South Alabama Jaguars	Sun Belt	Richie Riley	2018–19
South Carolina Gamecocks	Southeastern	Lamont Paris	2022–23
South Carolina State Bulldogs	Mid-Eastern	Erik Martin	2022–23
South Carolina Upstate Spartans	Big South	Marty Richter	2024–25
South Dakota Coyotes	Summit League	Eric Peterson	2022–23
South Dakota State Jackrabbits	Summit League	Bryan Petersen	2025–26
South Florida Bulls	American	Chris Mack	2026–27
Southeast Missouri Redhawks	Ohio Valley	Brad Korn	2020–21
Southeastern Louisiana Lions	Southland	David Kiefer	2019–20
Southern Jaguars	Southwestern	Kevin Johnson	2023–24
Southern Illinois Salukis	Missouri Valley	Scott Nagy	2024–25
Southern Indiana Screaming Eagles	Ohio Valley	Stan Gouard	2020–21
Southern Miss Golden Eagles	Sun Belt	Jay Ladner	2019–20
Southern Utah Thunderbirds	Big Sky	Rob Jeter	2023–24
Stanford Cardinal	Atlantic Coast	Kyle Smith	2024–25
Stephen F. Austin Lumberjacks	Southland	Matt Braeuer	2025–26
Stetson Hatters	Atlantic Sun	Donnie Jones	2019–20
Stonehill Skyhawks	NEC	Chris Kraus	2013–14
Stony Brook Seawolves	Coastal	Geno Ford	2019–20
Syracuse Orange	Atlantic Coast	Gerry McNamara	2026–27
Tarleton State Texans	United Athletic	Eric Haut	2026–27
TCU Horned Frogs	Big 12	Jamie Dixon	2016–17
Temple Owls	American	Adam Fisher	2023–24
Tennessee Volunteers	Southeastern	Rick Barnes	2015–16
Tennessee State Tigers	Ohio Valley	Nolan Smith	2025–26
Tennessee Tech Golden Eagles	Southern	Tobin Anderson	2026–27
Texas Longhorns	Southeastern	Sean Miller	2025–26
Texas A&M Aggies	Southeastern	Bucky McMillan	2025–26
Texas A&M–Corpus Christi Islanders	Southland	Jim Shaw	2023–24
Texas Southern Tigers	Southwestern	Corey Lowery	2026–27
Texas State Bobcats	Pac-12	Terrence Johnson	2020–21
Texas Tech Red Raiders	Big 12	Grant McCasland	2023–24
Toledo Rockets	Mid-American	Tod Kowalczyk	2010–11
Towson Tigers	Coastal	Pat Skerry	2011–12
Troy Trojans	Sun Belt	Adam Howard	2026–27
Tulane Green Wave	American	Ron Hunter	2019–20
Tulsa Golden Hurricane	American	Eric Konkol	2022–23
UAB Blazers	American	Andy Kennedy	2020–21
UC Davis Aggies	Mountain West	Jim Les	2011–12
UC Irvine Anteaters	Big West	Russell Turner	2010–11
UC Riverside Highlanders	Big West	Gus Argenal	2025–26
UC San Diego Tritons	Big West (Note: UC San Diego joins, and UC Santa Barbara rejoins, the West Coast Conference in 2027.)	Clint Allard	2025–26
UC Santa Barbara Gauchos	Big West	Joe Pasternack	2017–18
UCF Knights	Big 12	Johnny Dawkins	2016–17
UCLA Bruins	Big Ten	Mick Cronin	2019–20
UConn Huskies	Big East	Dan Hurley	2018–19
UIC Flames	Missouri Valley	Robert Ehsan	2024–25
UMass Minutemen	Mid-American	Frank Martin	2022–23
UMass Lowell River Hawks	America East	Pat Duquette	2013–14
UMBC Retrievers	America East	Jim Ferry	2021–22
UNC Asheville Bulldogs	Big South	Mike Morrell	2018–19
UNC Greensboro Spartans	Southern	Jerod Haase	2026–27
UNC Wilmington Seahawks	Coastal	Takayo Siddle	2020–21
UNLV Runnin' Rebels	Mountain West	Josh Pastner	2025–26
USC Trojans	Big Ten	Eric Musselman	2024–25
UT Arlington Mavericks	United Athletic	K. T. Turner	2023–24
UT Martin Skyhawks	Ohio Valley	Jeremy Shulman	2024–25
Utah Utes	Big 12	Alex Jensen	2025–26
Utah State Aggies	Pac-12	Ben Jacobson	2026–27
Utah Tech Trailblazers	Big Sky	Jon Judkins	2005–06
Utah Valley Wolverines	Big West	Todd Phillips	2023–24
UTEP Miners	Mountain West	Joe Golding	2021–22
UTRGV Vaqueros	Southland	Brandon Chambers	2026–27
UTSA Roadrunners	American	Austin Claunch	2024–25
Valparaiso Beacons	Missouri Valley	Roger Powell	2023–24
Vanderbilt Commodores	Southeastern	Mark Byington	2024–25
VCU Rams	Atlantic 10	Phil Martelli Jr.	2025–26
Vermont Catamounts	America East	John Becker	2011–12
Villanova Wildcats	Big East	Kevin Willard	2025–26
Virginia Cavaliers	Atlantic Coast	Ryan Odom	2025–26
Virginia Tech Hokies	Atlantic Coast	Mike Young	2019–20
VMI Keydets	Southern	Andrew Wilson	2022–23
Wagner Seahawks	NEC	Dwan McMillan	2025–26
Wake Forest Demon Deacons	Atlantic Coast	Steve Forbes	2020–21
Washington Huskies	Big Ten	Danny Sprinkle	2024–25
Washington State Cougars	Pac-12	David Riley	2024–25
Weber State Wildcats	Big Sky	Kaleb Canales	2026–27
West Florida Argonauts	Atlantic Sun	Tanner Smith	2026–27
West Georgia Wolves	United Athletic	Dave Moore	2018–19
West Virginia Mountaineers	Big 12	Ross Hodge	2025–26
Western Carolina Catamounts	Southern	Tim Craft	2024–25
Western Illinois Leathernecks	Ohio Valley	Chad Boudreau	2023–24
Western Kentucky Hilltoppers	Conference USA	Hank Plona	2024–25
Western Michigan Broncos	Mid-American	Kahil Fennell	2026–27
Wichita State Shockers	American	Paul Mills	2023–24
William & Mary Tribe	Coastal	Brian Earl	2024–25
Winthrop Eagles	Big South	Mark Prosser	2021–22
Wisconsin Badgers	Big Ten	Greg Gard	2015–16
Wofford Terriers	Southern	Kevin Giltner	2025–26
Wright State Raiders	Horizon League	Clint Sargent	2024–25
Wyoming Cowboys	Mountain West	Sundance Wicks	2024–25
Xavier Musketeers	Big East	Richard Pitino	2025–26
Yale Bulldogs	Ivy League	James Jones	1999–00
Youngstown State Penguins	Horizon League	Ethan Faulkner	2024–25

== See also ==
- List of current NCAA Division I baseball coaches
- List of current NCAA Division I FBS football coaches
- List of current NCAA Division I FCS football coaches
- List of current NCAA Division I women's basketball coaches
- List of current NCAA Division I men's ice hockey coaches
- List of NCAA Division I men's soccer coaches
