= 2026–27 William & Mary Tribe men's basketball team =

American college basketball season

2026–27 William & Mary Tribe men's basketball
- Conference: Coastal Athletic Association
- Record: 2–2 (0–0 CAA)
- Head coach: Brian Earl (3rd season)
- Assistant coaches: Jimmy Fenerty; Max Ginsberg; Alex Mumphard
- Home arena: Kaplan Arena

2026–27 CAA men's basketball standings
	Conf.				Overall
Team	W		L	PCT	W		L	PCT
UNC Wilmington	0	–	0	–	4	–	0	1.000
Charleston	0	–	0	–	3	–	0	1.000
William & Mary	0	–	0	–	2	–	1	.667
Towson	0	–	0	–	3	–	2	.600
Drexel	0	–	0	–	2	–	2	.500
Elon	0	–	0	–	2	–	2	.500
Hofstra	0	–	0	–	2	–	2	.500
North Carolina A&T	0	–	0	–	2	–	2	.500
Northeastern	0	–	0	–	2	–	2	.500
Monmouth	0	–	0	–	1	–	2	.333
Stony Brook	0	–	0	–	1	–	2	.333
Campbell	0	–	0	–	1	–	3	.250
Hampton	0	–	0	–	1	–	3	.250
† 2027 CAA tournament winner As of November 15, 2026; Rankings from AP poll

The 2026–27 William & Mary Tribe men's basketball team represents the College of William & Mary during the 2026–27 NCAA Division I men's basketball season. The Tribe, led by third-year head coach Brian Earl, play their home games at Kaplan Arena in Williamsburg, Virginia as members of the Coastal Athletic Association (CAA).

== Previous season ==
The Tribe finished the 2025–26 season 20–12, 10–8 in CAA play, to finish in fifth place. After receiving a bye into the second round of the CAA tournament, the team defeated Elon before losing to Hofstra in the quarterfinals.

== Offseason ==
=== Departures ===
Name	Number	Pos.	Height	Weight	Year	Hometown	Reason for departure
Reese Miller	0	G	6' 4"	180	Junior	Round Rock, TX	Transferred to UTEP
Cade Haskins	1	F	6' 6"	215	Graduate student	Minneapolis, MN	Graduated
Chase Lowe	2	G	6' 5"	205	Senior	Weddington, NC	Graduated
Kyle Frazier	7	G	6' 2"	190	Senior	Matthews, NC	Graduated
Jhei-R Jones	8	G	6' 0"	175	Graduate student	Sauk Village, IL	Graduated
Kyle Pulliam	11	G	6' 4"	190	Senior	Silver Spring, MD	Graduated
Ryan Jackson Jr.	15	G/F	6' 6"	205	Sophomore	Mesa, AZ	Transferred to UTEP
Tunde Vahlberg Fasasi	16	G	6' 7"	205	Junior	Stockholm, Sweden	Transferred to New Mexico
Kilian Brockhoff	22	F	6' 9"	235	Junior	Cuxhaven, Germany	Transferred to Eastern Michigan
Jo'el Emanuel	23	F	6' 6"	205	Graduate student	Suffern, NY	Graduated
Kaleb Spencer	24	F	6' 8"	225	Freshman	Manteo, NC	Transferred to Incarnate Word
Miles Hicks	25	G	6' 0"	160	Senior	Upper Marlboro, MD	Transferred to Assumption
Finn Lally	43	F	6' 8"	220	Senior	Hamilton, New Zealand	Graduated

=== Incoming transfers ===
Name	Number	Pos.	Height	Weight	Year	Hometown	Previous school
Brian Carter Jr.	1	F	6' 6"	195	Junior	Memphis, TN	Transferred from Walters State
Tre Blassingame	2	G	6' 4"	180	Graduate student	Auburn, WA	Transferred from Idaho
Jayden Forsythe	4	G	6' 5"	195	Sophomore	Brooklyn, NY	Transferred from West Virginia
John Roland Jr.	7	F	6' 7"	205	Junior	Coral Springs, FL	Transferred from Lynn
Will Feagles	8	G	6' 4"	200	Sophomore	Scottsdale, AZ	Transferred from Pima
Stas Sivka	9	F	6' 10"	220	Junior	Celje, Slovenia	Transferred from George Mason
Jesse McIntosh	10	G	6' 7"	200	Sophomore	Melbourne, Australia	Transferred from South Dakota
Gavin Ward	11	G	6' 6"	170	Sophomore	James Island, SC	Transferred from USC Salkehatchie
Nilavan Daniels	12	G	6' 3"	180	Junior	Saint Louis, MO	Transferred from Providence
Josh Baldwin	24	G	6' 5"	235	Graduate student	Everett, MA	Transferred from Cornell
ZZ Clark	33	G	6' 2"	205	Sophomore	Los Angeles, CA	Transferred from UCSB

=== 2026 recruiting class ===
College recruiting
Name	Hometown	School	Height	Weight	Commit date
Nick Byrd; G	Hopewell, VA	Hopewell High School	6 ft 1 in (1.85 m)	160 lb (73 kg)	Feb 16, 2026
Nick Byrd; G	Recruit ratings: Scout: Rivals: (NR)				
Chris Richards; G/F	Gaithersburg, MD	The Bullis School	6 ft 5 in (1.96 m)	185 lb (84 kg)	Jul 1, 2026
Chris Richards; G/F	Recruit ratings: Scout: Rivals: (NR)				
Overall recruit ranking:
Note: In many cases, Scout, Rivals, 247Sports, On3, and ESPN may conflict in their listings of height and weight.; In these cases, the average was taken. ESPN grades are on a 100-point scale.; Sources: "2026 Team Ranking". Rivals.

== Roster ==
2026–27 William & Mary Tribe men's basketball team
Players
Coaches

Pos.	#	Name	Height	Weight	Year	Previous school	Hometown
G	0	Nick Byrd	6 ft 1 in (1.85 m)	160 lb (73 kg)	Fr	Hopewell / S3 Academy	Hopewell, VA
F	1	Brian Carter Jr.	6 ft 6 in (1.98 m)	195 lb (88 kg)	Jr	Ridgeway / Walters State	Memphis, TN
G	2	Tre Blassingame	6 ft 4 in (1.93 m)	180 lb (82 kg)	GS	Auburn / Idaho	Auburn, WA
G	4	Jayden Forsythe	6 ft 5 in (1.96 m)	195 lb (88 kg)	So	Westtown School / West Virginia	Brooklyn, NY
G	5	Ethan Connery	6 ft 3 in (1.91 m)	190 lb (86 kg)	Sr	St. Vincent–St. Mary High School / Casper	Akron, OH
G	6	Colin Lamine Ndaw	6 ft 3 in (1.91 m)	180 lb (82 kg)	Jr	IMG Academy	Dakar, Senegal
F	7	John Roland Jr.	6 ft 7 in (2.01 m)	205 lb (93 kg)	Jr	Calvary Christian Academy / Lynn	Coral Springs, FL
G	8	Will Feagles	6 ft 4 in (1.93 m)	200 lb (91 kg)	So	Notre Dame Prep / Pima CC	Scottsdale, AZ
F	9	Stas Sivka	6 ft 10 in (2.08 m)	220 lb (100 kg)	Jr	George Mason	Celje, Slovenia
G	10	Jesse McIntosh	6 ft 7 in (2.01 m)	200 lb (91 kg)	So	Ivanhoe Grammar School / South Dakota	Melbourne, Australia
G	11	Gavin Ward	6 ft 6 in (1.98 m)	170 lb (77 kg)	So	James Island / USC Salkehatchie	James Island, SC
G	12	Nilavan Daniels	6 ft 3 in (1.91 m)	180 lb (82 kg)	Jr	Link Year Prep / Providence	St. Louis, MO
G/F	24	Josh Baldwin	6 ft 5 in (1.96 m)	235 lb (107 kg)	GS	Belmont Hills / Cornell	Everett, MA
G/F	31	Chris Richards	6 ft 5 in (1.96 m)	185 lb (84 kg)	Fr	The Bullis School	Gaithersburg, MD
G	33	ZZ Clark	6 ft 2 in (1.88 m)	205 lb (93 kg)	So	DNA Prep Academy / UC Santa Barbara	Los Angeles, CA

Head coach

- Brian Earl (Princeton)

Assistant coach(es)

- Jimmy Fenerty (Dickinson)
- Max Ginsberg (Cornell)
- Alex Mumphard (Greenville)

Legend

- (C) Team captain
- (S) Suspended
- (I) Ineligible
- (W) Walk-on
- Injured
- Current redshirt

Roster
Last update: August 30, 2026

== Schedule and results ==
Date time, TV	Rank^{#}	Opponent^{#}	Result	Record	Site (attendance) city, state
CAA regular season
December 31, 2026		Drexel			Kaplan Arena; Williamsburg, VA
January 2, 2027		Elon			Kaplan Arena; Williamsburg, VA
January 7, 2027		at Northeastern			Cabot Center; Boston, MA
January 9, 2027		at Hofstra			Mack Sports Complex; Hempstead, NY
January 14, 2027		Hampton			Kaplan Arena; Williamsburg, VA
January 16, 2027		Campbell			Kaplan Arena; Williamsburg, VA
January 18, 2027		at UNC Wilmington			Trask Coliseum; Wilmington, NC
January 21, 2027		at Stony Brook			Stony Brook Arena; Stony Brook, NY
January 23, 2027		at Towson			SECU Arena; Towson, MD
January 30, 2027		Northeastern			Kaplan Arena; Williamsburg, VA
February 4, 2027		UNC Wilmington			Kaplan Arena; Williamsburg, VA
February 6, 2027		Charleston			Kaplan Arena; Williamsburg, VA
February 13, 2027		at Campbell			John W. Pope Jr. Convocation Center; Buies Creek, NC
February 18, 2027		Monmouth			Kaplan Arena; Williamsburg, VA
February 20, 2027		at North Carolina A&T			Corbett Sports Center; Greensboro, NC
February 25, 2027		Towson			Kaplan Arena; Williamsburg, VA
February 27, 2027		at Elon			Schar Center; Elon, NC
March 2, 2027		at Hampton			Hampton Convocation Center; Hampton, VA
*Non-conference game. ^{#}Rankings from AP Poll. (#) Tournament seedings in parentheses. All times are in Eastern.
