= 2026–27 Penn Quakers men's basketball team =

American college basketball season

2026–27 Penn Quakers men's basketball
- Conference: Ivy League
- Record: 0–1 (0–0 Ivy)
- Head coach: Fran McCaffery (2nd season)
- Assistant coaches: Tristan Spurlock; Ben Luber; Ronald Moore
- Home arena: The Palestra

2026–27 Ivy League men's basketball standings
	Conf.				Overall
Team	W		L	PCT	W		L	PCT
Harvard	0	–	0	–	2	–	0	1.000
Cornell	0	–	0	–	2	–	1	.667
Columbia	0	–	0	–	2	–	1	.667
Dartmouth	0	–	0	–	2	–	1	.667
Princeton	0	–	0	–	2	–	1	.667
Penn	0	–	0	–	1	–	1	.500
Yale	0	–	0	–	1	–	1	.500
Brown	0	–	0	–	1	–	2	.333
† 2027 Ivy League tournament winner As of November 10, 2026; Rankings from AP poll

The 2026–27 Penn Quakers men's basketball team will represent the University of Pennsylvania during the 2026–27 NCAA Division I men's basketball season. The Quakers, led by second-year head coach Fran McCaffery, play their home games at The Palestra in Philadelphia, Pennsylvania as members of the Ivy League.

== Previous season ==
The Quakers finished the 2025–26 season 18–12, 9–5 in Ivy League play, to finish in third place. In the Ivy League Tournament, they would defeat Harvard and Yale to earn the conference's automatic bid into the 2026 NCAA Tournament. As the No. 14 seed in the South region, the Quakers were defeated in the first round by Illinois.

== Preseason ==
On October 12, 2026, the Ivy League released their preseason poll. Penn was picked to finish atop the conference, receiving 11 out of a possible 21 first-place votes.

=== Preseason rankings ===
Ivy League Preseason Poll
Place	Team	Votes
1	Penn	157 (11)
2	Harvard	146 (7)
3	Yale	133 (2)
4	Princeton	97 (1)
5	Cornell	82
6	Columbia	69
7	Brown	42
8	Dartmouth	30
(#) first-place votes

== Roster ==
2026–27 Penn Quakers men's basketball team
Players
Coaches

Pos.	#	Name	Height	Weight	Year	Previous school	Hometown
G	0	AJ Levine	6 ft 4 in (1.93 m)	185 lb (84 kg)	Jr	York High School	Elmhurst, Illinois
F	1	Finley Billy	6 ft 8 in (2.03 m)	210 lb (95 kg)	Fr	Bullis School	Arlington, Virginia
G	2	Chase Geremia	6 ft 2 in (1.88 m)	190 lb (86 kg)	Fr	The Newman School	Madison, Connecticut
G	3	Isaiah Carroll	6 ft 6 in (1.98 m)	195 lb (88 kg)	Fr	Blair Academy	Woodland Hills, California
G	4	Jay Jones	6 ft 4 in (1.93 m)	195 lb (88 kg)	So	Rivers School	Chestnut Hill, Massachusetts
G	5	Johnny Keenan	6 ft 0 in (1.83 m)	165 lb (75 kg)	Fr	St. Thomas More School	Rye, New York
G/F	7	Michael Zanoni	6 ft 5 in (1.96 m)	200 lb (91 kg)	Sr	Mercer	Charlotte, North Carolina
G	8	Ethan Lin	6 ft 5 in (1.96 m)	177 lb (80 kg)	Fr	Montgomery High School	Montgomery, New Jersey
G/F	10	Ryan Altman	6 ft 6 in (1.98 m)	200 lb (91 kg)	So	Rivers School	Chestnut Hill, Massachusetts
F	12	TJ Power	6 ft 9 in (2.06 m)	220 lb (100 kg)	Sr	Virginia	Shrewsbury, Massachusetts
F/C	13	Dalton Scantlebury	6 ft 9 in (2.06 m)	250 lb (113 kg)	So	Lane Tech	Chicago, Illinois
G	14	Sir Mohammed	6 ft 6 in (1.98 m)	215 lb (98 kg)	Jr	Notre Dame	Charlotte, North Carolina
G/F	21	Payton Kamin	6 ft 7 in (2.01 m)	210 lb (95 kg)	So	Worcester Academy	Chicago, Illinois
C	23	Michael Pereira	6 ft 10 in (2.08 m)	260 lb (118 kg)	Fr	Plymouth-Whitemarsh High School	Plymouth Meeting, Pennsylvania
G	24	Dorian Glogovac	6 ft 6 in (1.98 m)	185 lb (84 kg)	So	Caltech	Vancouver, British Columbia
F	25	Augustus Gerhart	6 ft 9 in (2.06 m)	235 lb (107 kg)	Sr	The Hill School	Denver, Pennsylvania
F	30	Lucas Lueth	6 ft 7 in (2.01 m)	210 lb (95 kg)	Jr	Kirkwood Community College	Ames, Iowa
G/F	35	Niklas Polonowski	6 ft 6 in (1.98 m)	210 lb (95 kg)	Sr	Lyons Township High School	La Grange, Illinois
F	40	William Kruse	6 ft 11 in (2.11 m)	240 lb (109 kg)	So	Norges Toppidrettsgymnas Bærum	Nesbru, Norway

Head coach

- Fran McCaffery (Penn)

Assistant coach(es)

- Tristan Spurlock (Central Florida)
- Ben Luber (Penn State)
- Ronald Moore (Siena)

Legend

- (C) Team captain
- (S) Suspended
- (I) Ineligible
- (W) Walk-on
- Injured
- Current redshirt

Roster
Last update: October 24, 2026

== Schedule and results ==
Date time, TV	Rank^{#}	Opponent^{#}	Result	Record	Site (attendance) city, state
Non-conference regular season
November 5, 2026; 8:30PM, FS1		at No. 3 Illinois	L 70–112	0–1	State Farm Center (15,046); Champaign, IL
November 9th, 2026; 6:00PM, ESPN+		Howard			The Palestra; Philadelphia, PA
November 11th, 2026; 5:30PM, CBSSN		at Navy; Veterans Classic			Alumni Hall; Annapolis, MD
November 14th, 2026; 6:30PM, ESPN+		at Saint Joseph's; Big 5 Classic Pod 2			Hagan Arena; Philadelphia, PA
November, 16th, 2026; 7:00PM, ESPN+		DeSale			The Palestra; Philadelphia, PA
November 21st, 2026; ESPN+		at La Salle			John Glaser Arena; Philadelphia, PA
November 24th, 2026; 8:00PM, ESPN+		Drexel; Big 5 Classic Pod 2, Battle of 33rd Street			The Palestra; Philadelphia, PA
November 27th, 2026; 6:00PM, ESPN+		Towson; Cathedral Classic			The Palestra; Philadelphia, PA
November 28th, 2026; 6:00PM, ESPN+		Bucknell; Cathedral Classic			The Palestra; Philadelphia, PA
December 1st, 2026; 7:00PM, ESPN+		Kutztown			The Palestra; Philadelphia, PA
December 5th, 2026		vs. TBD; Big 5 Classic			Xfinity Mobile Arena; Philadelphia, PA
December 7th, 2026		at Lafayette			Kirby Sports Center; Easton, PA
December 19th, 2026; ESPN+		Monmouth			The Palestra; Philadelphia, PA
December 22nd, 2026; 6:00PM, ESPN+		American			The Palestra; Philadelphia, PA
December 29th, 2026; 8:00PM, FS1		Michigan State			Breslin Center; East Lansing, MI
Ivy League regular season
January 4, 2026; 7:00PM, ESPN+		at Princeton; Rivalry			Jadwin Gymnasium; Princeton, NJ
January 8th, 2027; 7:00PM, ESPN+		at Brown			Pizzitola Sports Center; Providence, RI
January 16th, 2027; 2:00PM, ESPN+		Harvard			The Palestra; Philadelphia, PA
January 17th, 2027; 2:00PM, ESPN+		Dartmouth			The Palestra; Philadelphia, PA
January 23rd, 2027; 2:00PM, ESPN+		Yale			John J. Lee Amphitheater; New Haven, CT
January 29th, 2027; 7:00PM, ESPN+		Cornell			The Palestra; Philadelphia, PA
January 30th, 2027; 6:00PM, ESPN+		Columbia			The Palestra; Philadelphia, PA
February 6th, 2026; ESPN+		Princeton; Rivalry			The Palestra; Philadelphia, PA
February 12th, 2026; 7:00PM, ESPN+		at Cornell			Newman Arena; Ithaca, NY
February 13th, 2027; 6:00PM, ESPN+		at Columbia			Levien Gymnasium; New York, NY
February 20th, 2027; 2:00PM, ESPN+		Yale			The Palestra; Philadelphia, PA
February 26th, 2027; 7:00PM, ESPN+		at Harvard			Lavietes Pavilion; Cambridge, MA
February 27th, 2027; 5:00PM, ESPN+		at Dartmouth			Leede Arena; Hanover, NH
March 5th, 2027; 7:00PM, ESPN+		Brown			The Palestra; Philadelphia, PA
*Non-conference game. ^{#}Rankings from AP poll. (#) Tournament seedings in parentheses. All times are in Eastern.
