= 2026–27 Princeton Tigers men's basketball team =

American college basketball season

2026–27 Princeton Tigers men's basketball
- Conference: Ivy League
- Record: 4–2 (0–0 Ivy)
- Head coach: Mitch Henderson (15th season)
- Associate head coach: Mike Brennan
- Assistant coaches: Luke Gore; Justin Bradley
- Home arena: Jadwin Gymnasium

2026–27 Ivy League men's basketball standings
| | Conf. | | | | Overall |
| Team | W | | L | PCT | W | | L | PCT |
|---|---|---|---|---|---|---|---|---|
| Columbia | 0 | – | 0 | – | 5 | – | 1 | .833 |
| Dartmouth | 0 | – | 0 | – | 4 | – | 2 | .667 |
| Princeton | 0 | – | 0 | – | 4 | – | 2 | .667 |
| Cornell | 0 | – | 0 | – | 3 | – | 3 | .500 |
| Penn | 0 | – | 0 | – | 3 | – | 3 | .500 |
| Yale | 0 | – | 0 | – | 3 | – | 3 | .500 |
| Harvard | 0 | – | 0 | – | 3 | – | 4 | .429 |
| Brown | 0 | – | 0 | – | 2 | – | 5 | .286 |
† 2027 Ivy League tournament winner As of November 22, 2026; Rankings from AP poll

The 2026–27 Princeton Tigers men's basketball team represents Princeton University during the 2026–27 NCAA Division I men's basketball season. The Tigers, led by 15th-year head coach Mitch Henderson, play their home games at Jadwin Gymnasium in Princeton, New Jersey as members of the Ivy League.

== Previous season ==
The Tigers finished the 2025–26 season 9–20, 5–9 in Ivy League play, to finish in a three-way tie for fifth place. They failed to quailify for the Ivy League tournament, as only the top four teams in the conference qualify.

== Preseason ==
On October 12, 2026, the Ivy League released their preseason poll. Princeton was picked to finish fourth in the conference, receiving one out of a possible 21 first-place votes.

=== Preseason rankings ===
Ivy League Preseason Poll
| Place | Team | Votes |
|---|---|---|
| 1 | Penn | 157 (11) |
| 2 | Harvard | 146 (7) |
| 3 | Yale | 133 (2) |
| 4 | Princeton | 97 (1) |
| 5 | Cornell | 82 |
| 6 | Columbia | 69 |
| 7 | Brown | 42 |
| 8 | Dartmouth | 30 |
(#) first-place votes

== Roster ==
2026–27 Princeton Tigers men's basketball team
Players
Coaches

| Pos. | # | Name | Height | Weight | Year | Previous school | Hometown |
|---|---|---|---|---|---|---|---|
| G | 0 | Louis O'Keefe | 6 ft 3 in (1.91 m) | 195 lb (88 kg) | Fr | The Newman School | Nashville, Tennessee |
| G | 1 | Jake Sussberg | 6 ft 5 in (1.96 m) | 195 lb (88 kg) | So | Scarsdale High School | Scarsdale, New York |
| G | 2 | Peyton Seals | 6 ft 4 in (1.93 m) | 200 lb (91 kg) | Jr | Ramapo High School | Wyckoff, New Jersey |
| G | 3 | Dalen Davis | 6 ft 0 in (1.83 m) | 185 lb (84 kg) | Sr | Whitney M. Young Magnet High School | Chicago, Illinois |
| F | 4 | CJ Happy | 6 ft 9 in (2.06 m) | 230 lb (104 kg) | Jr | Milton Academy | Sterling, Massachusetts |
| G | 5 | Ethan Sabec | 6 ft 8 in (2.03 m) | 215 lb (98 kg) | Fr | Calvary Christian High School | Tampa, Florida |
| G | 6 | Ryan Mandes | 6 ft 3 in (1.91 m) | 200 lb (91 kg) | So | Valor Christian High School | Denver, Colorado |
| F | 7 | Malik Abdullahi | 6 ft 7 in (2.01 m) | 215 lb (98 kg) | Jr | Christopher Columbus High School | Miami, Florida |
| G | 8 | Landon Clark | 6 ft 8 in (2.03 m) | 205 lb (93 kg) | So | St. Paul's School | Bangor, Maine |
| C | 9 | William Higgs | 6 ft 11 in (2.11 m) | 265 lb (120 kg) | Fr | Northfield Mount Hermon School | Atlantic Highlands, New Jersey |
| G | 10 | Noah Cohen | 6 ft 0 in (1.83 m) | 170 lb (77 kg) | Fr | Upper Dublin High School | Dresher, Pennsylvania |
| F | 11 | Will Kutzler | 6 ft 8 in (2.03 m) | 210 lb (95 kg) | Sr | Lakeville North High School | Lakeville, Minnesota |
| F | 12 | Jacob Huggins | 6 ft 8 in (2.03 m) | 225 lb (102 kg) | Sr | Harvard-Westlake School | Oak Park, California |
| F | 15 | Cash McSweeney | 6 ft 8 in (2.03 m) | 225 lb (102 kg) | So | Cardinal Gibbons High School | Raleigh, North Carolina |
| G | 21 | Jack Stanton | 6 ft 2 in (1.88 m) | 184 lb (83 kg) | Jr | Downers Grove North High School | Downers Grove, Illinois |
| G | 22 | Zio Kim | 6 ft 4 in (1.93 m) | 175 lb (79 kg) | Jr | The Pennington School | Basking Ridge, New Jersey |
| G/F | 23 | Sebastian Whitfield | 6 ft 6 in (1.98 m) | 205 lb (93 kg) | So | Cape Henry Collegiate School | Virginia Beach, Virginia |
| F | 24 | Jacob Hammond | 6 ft 6 in (1.98 m) | 220 lb (100 kg) | So | IMG Academy | Whitby, Ontario |
| G | 30 | Christopher Kirkpatrick | 6 ft 3 in (1.91 m) | 185 lb (84 kg) | Fr | New Trier High School | Winnetka, Illinois |
| G | 33 | Jackson Hicke | 6 ft 5 in (1.96 m) | 210 lb (95 kg) | Sr | Radnor High School | Radnor, Pennsylvania |
| G | 66 | Cooper Mueller | 6 ft 3 in (1.91 m) | 180 lb (82 kg) | Sr | Radnor High School | Villanova, Pennsylvania |

Head coach

- Mitch Henderson (Princeton)

Assistant coach(es)

- Mike Brennan (Princeton)
- Luke Gore (Bethel (IN))
- Justin Bradley (Guilford)

Legend

- (C) Team captain
- (S) Suspended
- (I) Ineligible
- (W) Walk-on
- Injured
- Current redshirt

Roster
Last update: November 22, 2026

== Schedule and results ==
| Date time, TV | Rank^{#} | Opponent^{#} | Result | Record | Site (attendance) city, state |
Non-conference regular season
| November 2, 2026*; 4:00 pm, ESPN+ | | Carnegie Mellon | W 78–46 | 1–0 | Jadwin Gymnasium (451); Princeton, NJ |
| November 5, 2026*; 7:00 pm, ESPN+ | | Hofstra | W 60–58 | 2–0 | Jadwin Gymnasium (596); Princeton, NJ |
| November 8, 2026*; 1:00 pm, ESPN+/SNY | | at Siena | L 68–82 | 2–1 | MVP Arena (4,393); Albany, NY |
| November 11, 2026*; 7:00 pm, ESPN+ | | Stony Brook | W 69–59 | 3–1 | Jadwin Gymnasium (454); Princeton, NJ |
| November 15, 2026*; 2:00 pm, ESPN+ | | at Rhode Island | L 72–79 | 3–2 | Ryan Center (2,664); Kingston, RI |
| November 20, 2026*; 7:00 pm, ESPN+ | | Monmouth | W 75–64 | 4–2 | Jadwin Gymnasium (1,120); Princeton, NJ |
| November 25, 2026*; 4:00 pm | | vs. Liberty; Live Oak Bank Holiday Classic | | | Trask Coliseum; Wilmington, NC |
| November 27, 2026*; 3:00 pm, FloCollege | | at UNC Wilmington; Live Oak Bank Holiday Classic | | | Trask Coliseum; Wilmington, NC |
| November 28, 2026*; 12:00 pm | | vs. St. Thomas; Live Oak Bank Holiday Classic | | | Trask Coliseum; Wilmington, NC |
| December 3, 2026*; 7:00 pm, ESPN+ | | at Vermont | | | Patrick Gym; Burlington, VT |
| December 6, 2026*; 1:00 pm | | at Northeastern | | | Cabot Center; Boston, MA |
| December 8, 2026*; 7:00 pm, ESPN+ | | Bryant & Stratton | | | Jadwin Gymnasium; Princeton, NJ |
| December 12, 2026*; 1:00 pm | | at LIU | | | Steinberg Wellness Center; Brooklyn, NY |
| December 22, 2026*; 7:00 pm, NBCSP/SNY | | Temple | | | Jadwin Gymnasium; Princeton, NJ |
| December 29, 2026*; 10:00 pm, ESPN+ | | at Saint Mary's | | | University Credit Union Pavilion; Moraga, CA |
Ivy League regular season
| January 4, 2027; 6:00 pm, ESPN+ | | Penn; Rivalry | | | Jadwin Gymnasium; Princeton, NJ |
| January 9, 2027; 2:00 pm, ESPN+ | | at Yale | | | John J. Lee Amphitheater; New Haven, CT |
| January 16, 2027; 2:00 pm, ESPN+ | | Dartmouth | | | Jadwin Gymnasium; Princeton, NJ |
| January 18, 2027; 2:00 pm, NBCSP/SNY | | Harvard | | | Jadwin Gymnasium; Princeton, NJ |
| January 23, 2027; 2:00 pm, ESPN+ | | at Brown | | | Pizzitola Sports Center; Providence, RI |
| January 29, 2027; 7:00 pm, ESPN+ | | Columbia | | | Jadwin Gymnasium; Princeton, NJ |
| January 30, 2027; 6:00 pm, ESPN+ | | Cornell | | | Jadwin Gymnasium; Princeton, NJ |
| February 6, 2027; 4:00 pm, ESPN+ | | Penn; Rivalry | | | The Palestra; Philadelphia, PA |
| February 12, 2027; 7:00 pm, ESPN+ | | at Columbia | | | Levien Gymnasium; New York, NY |
| February 13, 2027; 5:00 pm, ESPN+ | | at Cornell | | | Newman Arena; Ithaca, NY |
| February 19, 2027; 7:00 pm, ESPN+ | | Brown | | | Jadwin Gymnasium; Princeton, NJ |
| February 26, 2027; 7:00 pm, ESPN+ | | at Dartmouth | | | Leede Arena; Hanover, NH |
| February 27, 2027; 6:00 pm, ESPN+ | | at Harvard | | | Lavietes Pavilion; Allston, MA |
| March 6, 2027; 2:00 pm, ESPN+ | | Yale | | | Jadwin Gymnasium; Princeton, NJ |
*Non-conference game. ^{#}Rankings from AP poll. (#) Tournament seedings in parentheses. All times are in Eastern.
