= Assumption College =

Assumption College may refer to these educational institutions:

== Australia ==
- Assumption College, Kilmore, Victoria
- Assumption College, Warwick, Queensland

== Canada ==
- Assumption University (Windsor, Ontario) (formerly Assumption College)
- Assumption College (Brantford), Brantford, Ontario

== Philippines ==
- Assumption College of Davao
- Assumption College San Lorenzo
- Assumption Antipolo
- Assumption Iloilo

== Thailand ==
- Assumption College (Thailand)
- Assumption College Samutprakarn
- Assumption College Sriracha
- Assumption College Thonburi

== United States ==
- Assumption University (Worcester), Worcester, Massachusetts
- Assumption College for Sisters, Mendham, New Jersey

== See also ==
- Assumption University (disambiguation)
