= 2026–27 Columbia Lions men's basketball team =

American college basketball season

2026–27 Columbia Lions men's basketball
- Conference: Ivy League
- Record: 4–1 (0–0 Ivy)
- Head coach: Kevin Hovde (2nd season)
- Assistant coaches: Mark McGonigal; Shasha Brown; Nate Hickman
- Home arena: Levien Gymnasium

2026–27 Ivy League men's basketball standings
	Conf.				Overall
Team	W		L	PCT	W		L	PCT
Columbia	0	–	0	–	4	–	1	.800
Dartmouth	0	–	0	–	4	–	2	.667
Princeton	0	–	0	–	3	–	2	.600
Cornell	0	–	0	–	2	–	2	.500
Harvard	0	–	0	–	2	–	3	.400
Penn	0	–	0	–	2	–	3	.400
Yale	0	–	0	–	2	–	3	.400
Brown	0	–	0	–	1	–	4	.200
† 2027 Ivy League tournament winner As of November 18, 2026; Rankings from AP poll

The 2026–27 Columbia Lions men's basketball team represent Columbia University during the 2026–27 NCAA Division I men's basketball season. The Lions, led by second-year head coach Kevin Hovde, play their home games at Levien Gymnasium in New York City as members of the Ivy League.

== Previous season ==
The Lions finished the 2025–26 season 16–12, 5–9 in Ivy League play, to finish in a three-way tie for fifth place. They failed to quailify for the Ivy League tournament, as only the top four teams in the conference qualify.

== Preseason ==
On October 12, 2026, the Ivy League released their preseason poll. Columbia was picked to finish sixth in the conference.

=== Preseason rankings ===
Ivy League Preseason Poll
Place	Team	Votes
1	Penn	157 (11)
2	Harvard	146 (7)
3	Yale	133 (2)
4	Princeton	97 (1)
5	Cornell	82
6	Columbia	69
7	Brown	42
8	Dartmouth	30
(#) first-place votes

== Roster ==
2026–27 Columbia Lions men's basketball team
Players
Coaches

Pos.	#	Name	Height	Weight	Year	Previous school	Hometown
G	0	Gabe Hornberger	6 ft 4 in (1.93 m)	200 lb (91 kg)	Fr	Peddie School	Nazareth, Pennsylvania
G	1	Josh Pratt	6 ft 2 in (1.88 m)	170 lb (77 kg)	Sr	Lincoln Park Performing Arts Charter School	Columbus, Ohio
G	2	Hampton Sanders	6 ft 0 in (1.83 m)	180 lb (82 kg)	Sr	NYU	South Brunswick, New Jersey
G	4	Gerard O'Keefe	6 ft 3 in (1.91 m)	195 lb (88 kg)	Jr	IMG Academy	Nashville, Tennessee
G	5	Nicolo Romanelli	6 ft 2 in (1.88 m)	175 lb (79 kg)	Sr	DME Academy	Sydney, Australia
F	6	Leland Coleman	6 ft 7 in (2.01 m)	190 lb (86 kg)	Jr	New Orleans	Richmond, Virginia
F	7	Douglas Langford	6 ft 8 in (2.03 m)	245 lb (111 kg)	So	San Jose State	Dangriga, Belize
G	8	Josiah Cunningham	6 ft 2 in (1.88 m)	190 lb (86 kg)	Jr	Coronado High School	Long Beach, California
G	9	Michael Madueme	6 ft 5 in (1.96 m)	200 lb (91 kg)	Fr	Lake Highland Preparatory School	Orlando, Florida
F	10	Connor Igoe	6 ft 8 in (2.03 m)	235 lb (107 kg)	So	Poly Prep	Brooklyn, New York
F	11	Nigel Clarkson	6 ft 8 in (2.03 m)	195 lb (88 kg)	Jr	Hargrave Military Academy	Fayetteville, North Carolina
G	12	Nino Žarković	6 ft 0 in (1.83 m)	180 lb (82 kg)	Fr	KK Zagreb	Zagreb, Croatia
G	13	Trae Nunn	6 ft 4 in (1.93 m)	230 lb (104 kg)	Fr	Dynamic Prep	Dallas, Texas
F	14	Mason Ritter	6 ft 9 in (2.06 m)	250 lb (113 kg)	Jr	Bowling Green High School	Bowling Green, Kentucky
G	21	Dan Vessey	6 ft 3 in (1.91 m)	205 lb (93 kg)	Sr	Rutgers	Kalamazoo, Michigan
F	22	Richard Nweke	6 ft 7 in (2.01 m)	215 lb (98 kg)	Sr	Northfield Mount Hermon School	Anambra, Nigeria
G	24	Miles Franklin	6 ft 5 in (1.96 m)	200 lb (91 kg)	So	St. Andrew's Episcopal School	Vienna, Virginia
F	34	Luke Cruz	6 ft 9 in (2.06 m)	230 lb (104 kg)	Fr	Rumson-Fair Haven Regional High School	Fair Haven, New Jersey

Head coach

- Kevin Hovde (Richmond)

Assistant coach(es)

- Mark McGonigal (Richmond)
- Shasha Brown (Wesleyan)
- Nate Hickman (Columbia)

Legend

- (C) Team captain
- (S) Suspended
- (I) Ineligible
- (W) Walk-on
- Injured
- Current redshirt

Roster
Last update: November 18, 2026

== Schedule and results ==
Date time, TV	Rank^{#}	Opponent^{#}	Result	Record	Site (attendance) city, state
Non-conference regular season
November 2, 2026*; 7:00 pm, ESPN+		Elon	L 71–84	0–1	Levien Gymnasium (647); New York, NY
November 5, 2026*; 7:00 pm, ESPN+		SUNY Old Westbury	W 120–58	1–1	Levien Gymnasium (505); New York, NY
November 9, 2026*; 7:00 pm, ESPN+		Stonehill	W 75–55	2–1	Levien Gymnasium (543); New York, NY
November 13, 2026*; 7:00 pm, ESPN+		at Bucknell	W 77–59	3–1	Sojka Pavilion (967); Lewisburg, PA
November 16, 2026*; 8:00 pm, B1G+		at Northwestern	W 75–53	4–1	Welsh–Ryan Arena (3,874); Evanston, IL
November 21, 2026*; 12:00 pm, ESPN+		at Boston University			Case Gym; Boston, MA
November 25, 2026*; 2:00 pm, ESPN+		Saint Peter's			Levien Gymnasium; New York, NY
November 28, 2026*; 2:00 pm, ESPN+		North Florida			Levien Gymnasium; New York, NY
December 1, 2026*; 6:30 pm, ESPN+		at St. John's			Carnesecca Arena; Queens, NY
December 4, 2026*; 6:00 pm, NECFR		at New Haven			Hazell Center; West Haven, CT
December 8, 2026*; 7:00 pm, SNY/ESPN+		Hofstra			Levien Gymnasium; New York, NY
December 11, 2026*; 7:00 pm, ESPN+		Army			Levien Gymnasium; New York, NY
December 16, 2026*; 6:00 pm, ESPN+		Norfolk State			Levien Gymnasium; New York, NY
December 29, 2026*; 6:30 pm, ESPN+		at Albany			Broadview Center; Guilderland, NY
December 31, 2026*; 1:00 pm, ESPN+		Sarah Lawrence			Levien Gymnasium; New York, NY
Ivy League regular season
January 5, 2027; 7:00 pm, ESPN+		Cornell			Levien Gymnasium; New York, NY
January 9, 2027; 2:00 pm, ESPN+		at Harvard			Lavietes Pavilion; Allston, MA
January 15, 2027; 7:00 pm, ESPN+		Yale			Levien Gymnasium; New York, NY
January 18, 2027; 2:00 pm, SNY/ESPN+		Brown			Levien Gymnasium; New York, NY
January 23, 2027; 2:00 pm, ESPN+		Dartmouth			Levien Gymnasium; New York, NY
January 29, 2027; 7:00 pm, ESPN+		at Princeton			Jadwin Gymnasium; Princeton, NJ
January 30, 2027; 6:00 pm, ESPNU		at Penn			The Palestra; Philadelphia, PA
February 5, 2027; 6:00 pm, ESPN+		at Cornell			Newman Arena; Ithaca, NY
February 12, 2027; 7:00 pm, ESPN+		Princeton			Levien Gymnasium; New York, NY
February 13, 2027; 6:00 pm, SNY/ESPN+		Penn			Levien Gymnasium; New York, NY
February 20, 2027; 2:00 pm, ESPN+		at Dartmouth			Leede Arena; Hanover, NH
February 26, 2027; 7:00 pm, ESPN+		at Yale			John J. Lee Amphitheater; New Haven, CT
February 27, 2027; 6:00 pm, ESPN+		at Brown			Pizzitola Sports Center; Providence, RI
March 5, 2027; 6:00 pm, ESPN+		Harvard			Levien Gymnasium; New York, NY
*Non-conference game. ^{#}Rankings from AP poll. (#) Tournament seedings in parentheses. All times are in Eastern.
