= 2026–27 UNC Wilmington Seahawks men's basketball team =

American college basketball season

2026–27 UNC Wilmington Seahawks men's basketball
- Conference: Coastal Athletic Association
- Record: 4–1 (0–0 CAA)
- Head coach: Takayo Siddle (7th season)
- Associate head coach: Kurt Kanaskie
- Assistant coaches: Craig Ponder; Paul Hemrick; Hunter Henderson; Austin Parker
- Home arena: Trask Coliseum

2026–27 CAA men's basketball standings
	Conf.				Overall
Team	W		L	PCT	W		L	PCT
Charleston	0	–	0	–	4	–	1	.800
UNC Wilmington	0	–	0	–	4	–	1	.800
Towson	0	–	0	–	3	–	3	.500
North Carolina A&T	0	–	0	–	3	–	2	.600
William & Mary	0	–	0	–	3	–	2	.600
Drexel	0	–	0	–	2	–	2	.500
Stony Brook	0	–	0	–	2	–	2	.500
Elon	0	–	0	–	2	–	3	.400
Hofstra	0	–	0	–	2	–	3	.400
Northeastern	0	–	0	–	2	–	3	.400
Hampton	0	–	0	–	1	–	3	.250
Monmouth	0	–	0	–	1	–	3	.250
Campbell	0	–	0	–	1	–	4	.200
† 2027 CAA tournament winner As of November 21, 2026; Rankings from AP poll

The 2026–27 UNC Wilmington Seahawks men's basketball team represents the University of North Carolina Wilmington during the 2026–27 NCAA Division I men's basketball season. The Seahawks, led by seventh-year head coach Takayo Siddle, play their home games at Trask Coliseum in Wilmington, North Carolina as members of the Coastal Athletic Association.

== Offseason ==
=== Departures ===
UNCW departures
Name	Number	Pos.	Height	Weight	Year	Hometown	Reason for departure
Madison Durr	1	G	6 ft 5 in (1.96 m)	195 pounds (88 kg)	Senior	Atlanta, GA	Graduated
Nolan Hodge	4	G	6 ft 7 in (2.01 m)	190 pounds (86 kg)	Senior	Greensboro, NC	Graduated
Noah Ross	5	G	6 ft 7 in (2.01 m)	210 pounds (95 kg)	Senior	Apex, NC	Graduated
Greedy Williams	7	G	6 ft 5 in (1.96 m)	190 pounds (86 kg)	Senior	Montgomery, AL	Graduated
Christian May	8	G/F	6 ft 5 in (1.96 m)	210 pounds (95 kg)	Senior	Edinburg, VA	Graduated
JoJo Fullwood	14	G	6 ft 2 in (1.88 m)	195 pounds (88 kg)	Senior	Currie, NC	Graduated

==== Outgoing transfers ====
Outgoing transfers
Name	Number	Pos.	Height	Weight	Hometown	Year	New school
Grady Whitt	10	G	6 ft 3 in (191 cm)	170 lb (77 kg)	Raleigh, NC	RS-So.	Colorado
Makoi Mabor Makoi	13	F	6 ft 11 in (211 cm)	240 lb (110 kg)	Rumbek, SSD	So.	Mercer
Adam Tokpah	35	F/C	6 ft 11 in (211 cm)	230 lb (100 kg)	Sheffield, ENG	Fr.	Alcorn State

=== Incoming transfers ===
UNCW incoming transfers
Name	Number	Pos.	Height	Weight	Year	Hometown	Previous School
Xavier Brown	0	G	6 ft 2 in (188 cm)	174 lb (79 kg)	Gr.	Williamsburg, VA	South Florida
Tyler Nelson	1	F	6 ft 6 in (198 cm)	228 lb (103 kg)	Gr.	Charlotte, NC	Navy
Treyvon Maddox	6	G	6 ft 6 in (198 cm)	220 lb (100 kg)	RS-Fr.	Columbia, SC	Miaim (FL)
William Kermoury	7	G	6 ft 5 in (196 cm)	195 lb (88 kg)	Sr.	Solna, SWE	Northeastern
Tahlan Pettway	8	G	6 ft 2 in (188 cm)	170 lb (77 kg)	So.	Worcester, MA	Western Carolina
Spencer Elliott	9	F	6 ft 10 in (208 cm)	223 lb (101 kg)	RS-Jr.	Atlanta, GA	Charlotte

=== 2026 recruits ===
The following players have committed to playing for UNCW.

College recruiting
Name	Hometown	School	Height	Weight	Commit date
Tamarion Siddle; G	Martinsville, VA	Martinsville (VA)	6 ft 3 in (1.91 m)	185 lb (84 kg)	Apr 22, 2026
Tamarion Siddle; G	Recruit ratings: Scout: Rivals: 247Sports: ESPN: (70)				
Kellum Brown; G	Wilmington, NC	New Hanover	6 ft 5 in (1.96 m)	185 lb (84 kg)	May 20, 2026
Kellum Brown; G	Recruit ratings: Scout: Rivals: 247Sports: ESPN: (72)				
William Seward; F	Wilmington, NC	John T. Hoggard	6 ft 6 in (1.98 m)	187 lb (85 kg)	May 27, 2026
William Seward; F	Recruit ratings: Scout: Rivals: 247Sports: ESPN: (66)				
Overall recruit ranking:
Note: In many cases, Scout, Rivals, 247Sports, On3, and ESPN may conflict in their listings of height and weight.; In these cases, the average was taken. ESPN grades are on a 100-point scale.; Sources: "UNCW 2026 Player Commits". ESPN.; "2026 Team Ranking". Rivals.

== Preseason ==
=== Preseason poll ===
The 2026–27 Coastal Athletic Association preseason poll was released on October 15, 2026. UNC Wilmington was picked to win the CAA.

CAA Preseason Poll
Place	Team	Points
1	UNC Wilmington	143 (11)
2	Charleston	130
3	Hofstra	125 (2)
4	Towson	110
5	Monmouth	95
6	William & Mary	78
7	Stony Brook	69
8	Elon	63
9	Drexel	58
10	Hampton	48
11	Northeastern	42
12	Campbell	35
13	North Carolina A&T	18
(#) first-place votes

== Roster ==
2026–27 UNC Wilmington Seahawks men's basketball team
Players
Coaches

Pos.	#	Name	Height	Weight	Year	Previous school	Hometown
G	0	Xavier Brown	6 ft 2 in (1.88 m)	174 lb (79 kg)	GS	South Florida	Williamsburg, VA
F	1	Tyler Nelson	6 ft 6 in (1.98 m)	228 lb (103 kg)	GS	Navy	Charlotte, NC
F	2	Patrick Wessler	7 ft 0 in (2.13 m)	250 lb (113 kg)	RS Jr	Virginia Tech	Matthews, NC
G	3	CJ Luster II	6 ft 3 in (1.91 m)	175 lb (79 kg)	Sr	Stony Brook	Denton, TX
G	4	Tamarion Siddle	6 ft 3 in (1.91 m)	185 lb (84 kg)	Fr	Martinsville High School	Martinsville, VA
G	5	Jahnathan Lamothe	6 ft 4 in (1.93 m)	192 lb (87 kg)	Jr	North Carolina A&T	Baltimore, MD
G	6	Treyvon Maddox	6 ft 6 in (1.98 m)	200 lb (91 kg)	RS Fr	Miami (FL)	Columbia, SC
G	1	William Kermoury	6 ft 5 in (1.96 m)	195 lb (88 kg)	Sr	Northeastern	Solna, SWE
G	8	Tahlan Pettway	6 ft 2 in (1.88 m)	170 lb (77 kg)	So	Western Carolina	Worcester, MA
F	9	Spencer Elliott	6 ft 10 in (2.08 m)	223 lb (101 kg)	RS Jr	Charlotte	Atlanta, GA
G	10	Kellum Brown	6 ft 5 in (1.96 m)	185 lb (84 kg)	Fr	New Hanover High School	Wilmington, NC
G	12	Makel Smith	6 ft 0 in (1.83 m)	175 lb (79 kg)	RS So	Morehead High School	Eden, NC
F	21	William Seward	6 ft 6 in (1.98 m)	187 lb (85 kg)	Fr	John T. Hoggard High School	Wilmington, NC
F	22	Gavin Walsh	6 ft 8 in (2.03 m)	225 lb (102 kg)	Sr	Binghamton	Baltimore, MD
F/C	24	Matija Prodanović	6 ft 11 in (2.11 m)	230 lb (104 kg)	RS Fr	KK Mladost VEBA	Užice, SER

Head coach

- Takayo Siddle (Gardner–Webb)

Assistant coach(es)

- Kurt Kanaskie (La Salle)
- Craig Ponder (UNC Wilmington)
- Paul Hemrick (Georgia)
- Austin Parker (NC State)

Legend

- (C) Team captain
- (S) Suspended
- (I) Ineligible
- (W) Walk-on
- Injured
- Current redshirt

Roster
Last update: November 21, 2026

== Schedule and results ==
Date time, TV	Rank^{#}	Opponent^{#}	Result	Record	High points	High rebounds	High assists	Site (attendance) city, state
Exhibition
October 11, 2026*; 2:00 p.m.		Lees–McRae	W 88–57	—	–	–	–	Trask Coliseum; Wilmington, NC
October 17, 2026*; 1:00 p.m.		at High Point	L 71–92	—	–	–	–	Qubein Center (0); High Point, NC
October 24, 2026*; 12:00 p.m.		UNC Greensboro	W 97–87	—	–	–	–	Trask Coliseum; Wilmington, NC
Non-conference regular season
November 2, 2026*; 7:00 p.m., FloSports		Mount Olive (D-II)	W 101–65	1–0	21 – Luster II	12 – Wessler	5 – Brown	Trask Coliseum (5,230); Wilmington, NC
November 7, 2026*; 2:00 p.m., ESPN+		at East Carolina	W 78–75	2–0	24 – Wessler	18 – Wessler	3 – Tied	Minges Coliseum (4,543); Greenville, NC
November 11, 2026*; 7:00 p.m., FloSports		Kent State	W 91–73	3–0	24 – Wessler	18 – Wessler	3 – Tied	Trask Coliseum (5,230); Wilmington, NC
November 14, 2026*; 4:00 p.m., FloSports		Montreat (NAIA)	W 100–41	4–0	19 – Pettway	10 – Prodanović	5 – Pettway	Trask Coliseum (5,160); Wilmington, NC
November 18, 2026*; 7:00 p.m.		at LIU	L 114–115 ^{2OT}	4–1	25 – Pettway	15 – Wessler	5 – Pettway	Steinberg Center (323); Brooklyn, NY
November 21, 2026*; 6:00 p.m.		at Norfolk State						Echols Hall; Norfolk, VA
November 25, 2026*; 7:00 p.m., FloSports		St. Thomas (MN); Live Oak Bank Holiday Classic						Trask Coliseum; Wilmington, NC
November 27, 2026*; 3:00 p.m., FloSports		Princeton; Live Oak Bank Holiday Classic						Trask Coliseum; Wilmington, NC
November 28, 2026*; 3:00 p.m., FloSports		Liberty; Live Oak Bank Holiday Classic						Trask Coliseum; Wilmington, NC
December 2, 2026*; 7:00 p.m., ESPN+		at Marshall						Cam Henderson Center; Huntington, WV
December 5, 2026*; 7:00 p.m., FloSports		Valparaiso						Trask Coliseum; Wilmington, NC
December 12, 2026*; 7:00 p.m., ESPN+		at Georgia Southern						Hill Convocation Center; Statesboro, GA
December 19, 2026*; 2:00 p.m., ESPN+		at Radford						Trask Coliseum; Wilmington, NC
December 28, 2026*; 5:00 p.m., ESPN+		Columbia (SC) (NAIA)						Trask Coliseum; Wilmington, NC
CAA regular season
December 31, 2026*; 2:00 p.m., ESPN+		Campbell						Trask Coliseum; Wilmington, NC
January 2, 2027; 7:00 p.m., FloSports		Northeastern						Trask Coliseum; Wilmington, NC
January 7, 2027; 7:00 p.m., FloSports		at North Carolina A&T						Corbett Sports Center; Greensboro, NC
January 11, 2027; 8:30 p.m., CBSSN		at Elon						Schar Center; Elon, NC
January 16, 2027; 8:30 p.m., FloSports		Towson						Trask Coliseum; Wilmington, NC
January 18, 2027; 7:00 p.m., CBSSN		William & Mary						Trask Coliseum; Wilmington, NC
January 21, 2027; 7:00 p.m., FloSports		at Monmouth						Hackensack Center; West Long Branch, NJ
January 23, 2027; 4:00 p.m., CBSSN		at Hofstra						Mack Sports Complex; Hempstead, NY
January 28, 2027; 6:30 p.m., CBSSN		Charleston						Trask Coliseum; Wilmington, NC
January 30, 2027; 4:00 p.m., FloSports		at Campbell						Pope Convocation Center; Buies Creek, NC
February 4, 2027; 6:00 p.m., CBSSN		at William & Mary						Kaplan Arena; Williamsburg, VA
February 6, 2027; 7:00 p.m., CBSSN		Hampton						Trask Coliseum; Wilmington, NC
February 13, 2027; 7:00 p.m., FloSports		Stony Brook						Trask Coliseum; Wilmington, NC
February 18, 2027; 7:00 p.m., FloSports		at Drexel						Daskalakis Athletic Center; Philadelphia, PA
February 20, 2027; 4:00 p.m., FloSports		at Towson						SECU Arena; Towson, MD
February 25, 2027; 8:30 p.m., CBSSN		North Carolina A&T						Trask Coliseum; Wilmington, NC
February 28, 2027; 4:00 p.m., CBSSN		at Charleston						TD Arena; Charleston, SC
March 2, 2027; 7:00 p.m., FloSports		Elon						Trask Coliseum; Wilmington, NC
