= 2026–27 Dartmouth Big Green men's basketball team =

American college basketball season

2026–27 Dartmouth Big Green men's basketball
- Conference: Ivy League
- Record: 4–2 (0–0 Ivy)
- Head coach: Brett MacConnell (1st season)
- Assistant coaches: Nick Nichay; Amir Bell; Eamonn Kearney
- Home arena: Leede Arena

2026–27 Ivy League men's basketball standings
	Conf.				Overall
Team	W		L	PCT	W		L	PCT
Columbia	0	–	0	–	4	–	1	.800
Dartmouth	0	–	0	–	4	–	2	.667
Princeton	0	–	0	–	4	–	2	.667
Yale	0	–	0	–	3	–	3	.500
Harvard	0	–	0	–	3	–	4	.429
Cornell	0	–	0	–	2	–	3	.400
Penn	0	–	0	–	2	–	3	.400
Brown	0	–	0	–	2	–	4	.333
† 2027 Ivy League tournament winner As of November 22, 2026; Rankings from AP poll

The 2026–27 Dartmouth Big Green men's basketball team represents Dartmouth College during the 2026–27 NCAA Division I men's basketball season. The Big Green, led by first-year head coach Brett MacConnell, play their home games at Leede Arena in Hanover, New Hampshire as members of the Ivy League.

== Previous season ==
The Big Green finished the 2025–26 season 11–16, 5–9 in Ivy League play, to finish in a three-way tie for fifth place. They failed to quailify for the Ivy League tournament, as only the top four teams in the conference qualify.

Following the season, on March 17, 2026, the school announced that they would be parting ways with longtime head coach David McLaughlin, ending his nine-year tenure with the team. On March 30, the school announced that they would be hiring Stanford assistant coach Brett MacConnell as the team's new head coach.

== Preseason ==
On October 12, 2026, the Ivy League released their preseason poll. Dartmouth was picked to finish eighth (last) in the conference.

=== Preseason rankings ===
Ivy League Preseason Poll
Place	Team	Votes
1	Penn	157 (11)
2	Harvard	146 (7)
3	Yale	133 (2)
4	Princeton	97 (1)
5	Cornell	82
6	Columbia	69
7	Brown	42
8	Dartmouth	30
(#) first-place votes

== Roster ==
2026–27 Dartmouth Big Green men's basketball team
Players
Coaches

Pos.	#	Name	Height	Weight	Year	Previous school	Hometown
G	0	Ben Brown	6 ft 2 in (1.88 m)	205 lb (93 kg)	Sr	Manchester Grammar School	Manchester, England
G	1	CJ Aldrich III	6 ft 2 in (1.88 m)	165 lb (75 kg)	Fr	Rancho Buena Vista High School	San Diego, California
G	2	Landon Williams	6 ft 5 in (1.96 m)	200 lb (91 kg)	RS So	Niagara	Farmington Hills, Michigan
C	4	Dan Civello	6 ft 11 in (2.11 m)	240 lb (109 kg)	Jr	Colby	South Weymouth, Massachusetts
G	5	Cameron McNamee	6 ft 6 in (1.98 m)	190 lb (86 kg)	Jr	Santa Margarita Catholic High School	Mission Viejo, California
F	7	Patrick Tivnan Jr.	6 ft 8 in (2.03 m)	230 lb (104 kg)	Sr	Charlotte Catholic High School	Charlotte, North Carolina
C	10	Anton Strelnikov	6 ft 8 in (2.03 m)	220 lb (100 kg)	So	La Lumiere School	Lake Zurich, Illinois
G	11	Cam Hiatt	6 ft 4 in (1.93 m)	205 lb (93 kg)	So	Edmonds Woodway High School	Edmonds, Washington
F	12	Jake Pollack	6 ft 9 in (2.06 m)	230 lb (104 kg)	Fr	Deerfield High School	Deerfield, Illinois
G	13	Ernas Valauskas	6 ft 4 in (1.93 m)	205 lb (93 kg)	Fr	The McCallie School	Šiauliai, Lithuania
G	15	Acen Jimenez	6 ft 2 in (1.88 m)	195 lb (88 kg)	Fr	La Habra High School	Whittier, California
G	23	Nikola Abusara	6 ft 5 in (1.96 m)	195 lb (88 kg)	Sr	Benet Academy	Chicago, Illinois
F	44	Shanon Simango	6 ft 8 in (2.03 m)	255 lb (116 kg)	Jr	Blue Ridge School	Maputo, Mozambique
F	50	Tyler Garrett	6 ft 10 in (2.08 m)	245 lb (111 kg)	So	Georgetown Prep	Potomac, Maryland

Head coach

- Brett MacConnell (Rutgers)

Assistant coach(es)

- Nick Nichay (Rutgers)
- Amir Bell (Princeton)
- Eamonn Kearney (Drew)

Legend

- (C) Team captain
- (S) Suspended
- (I) Ineligible
- (W) Walk-on
- Injured
- Current redshirt

Roster
Last update: November 22, 2026

== Schedule and results ==
Date time, TV	Rank^{#}	Opponent^{#}	Result	Record	Site (attendance) city, state
Non-conference regular season
November 2, 2026*; 7:00 pm, ESPN+		at Marist	W 69–62	1–0	McCann Arena (890); Poughkeepsie, NY
November 4, 2026*; 6:30 pm, ESPN+		Framingham State	W 107–50	2–0	Leede Arena (783); Hanover, NH
November 8, 2026*; 2:00 pm, ESPN+		Central Connecticut	L 71–78 ^{OT}	2–1	Leede Arena (850); Hanover, NH
November 11, 2026*; 1:00 pm, ESPN+		at Albany	W 85–76	3–1	Broadview Center (1,656); Guilderland, NY
November 15, 2026*; 1:00 pm, ESPN+		at Boston University	L 75–90	3–2	Case Gym; Boston, MA
November 17, 2026*; 6:30 pm, ESPN+		Maine Augusta	W 117–67	4–2	Leede Arena (498); Hanover, NH
November 25, 2026*; 5:00 pm, ESPN+		Holy Cross			Leede Arena; Hanover, NH
November 29, 2026*; 1:00 pm, ESPN+		at Appalachian State			Holmes Center; Boone, NC
December 2, 2026*; 7:00 pm, ESPN+		at Davidson			John M. Belk Arena; Davidson, NC
December 6, 2026*; 2:00 pm, ESPN+		Maine Maritime			Leede Arena; Hanover, NH
December 12, 2026*; 1:00 pm, ESPN+		at New Hampshire; Rivalry			Lundholm Gym; Durham, NH
December 16, 2026*; 6:30 pm, ESPN+		at Temple			Liacouras Center; Philadelphia, PA
December 20, 2026*; 2:00 pm, ESPN+		Sacred Heart			Leede Arena; Hanover, NH
December 29, 2026*; 2:00 pm, ESPN+		Stonehill			Leede Arena; Hanover, NH
Ivy League regular season
January 4, 2027; 6:30 pm, ESPN+		Harvard			Leede Arena; Hanover, NH
January 9, 2027; 2:00 pm, ESPN+		Cornell			Leede Arena; Hanover, NH
January 16, 2027; 2:00 pm, ESPN+		at Princeton			Jadwin Gymnasium; Princeton, NJ
January 18, 2027; 2:00 pm, ESPN+		at Penn			The Palestra; Philadelphia, PA
January 23, 2027; 2:00 pm, ESPN+		at Columbia			Levien Gymnasium; New York, NY
January 29, 2027; 7:00 pm, ESPN+		Brown			Leede Arena; Hanover, NH
January 30, 2027; 6:00 pm, ESPN+		Yale			Leede Arena; Hanover, NH
February 6, 2027; 2:00 pm, ESPN+		at Harvard			Lavietes Pavilion; Allston, MA
February 12, 2027; 7:00 pm, ESPN+		at Brown			Pizzitola Sports Center; Providence, RI
February 13, 2027; 7:00 pm, ESPN+		at Yale			John J. Lee Amphitheater; New Haven, CT
February 20, 2027; 2:00 pm, ESPN+		Columbia			Leede Arena; Hanover, NH
February 26, 2027; 7:00 pm, ESPN+		Princeton			Leede Arena; Hanover, NH
February 27, 2027; 5:00 pm, ESPN+		Penn			Leede Arena; Hanover, NH
March 6, 2027; 2:00 pm, ESPN+		at Cornell			Newman Arena; Ithaca, NY
*Non-conference game. ^{#}Rankings from AP poll. (#) Tournament seedings in parentheses. All times are in Eastern.
