= 2026–27 Drexel Dragons men's basketball team =

American college basketball season

2026–27 Drexel Dragons men's basketball
- Conference: Coastal Athletic Association
- Record: 1–1 (0–0 CAA)
- Head coach: Zach Spiker (11th season)
- Assistant coaches: Paul Fortier (11th season); Frantz Massenat (4th season); Tim Brooks (2nd season); Nat Graham (1st season)
- Home arena: Daskalakis Athletic Center

2026–27 CAA men's basketball standings
	Conf.				Overall
Team	W		L	PCT	W		L	PCT
Charleston	0	–	0	–	4	–	0	1.000
UNC Wilmington	0	–	0	–	4	–	0	1.000
Towson	0	–	0	–	3	–	2	.600
William & Mary	0	–	0	–	3	–	2	.600
Drexel	0	–	0	–	2	–	2	.500
Elon	0	–	0	–	2	–	2	.500
North Carolina A&T	0	–	0	–	2	–	2	.500
Northeastern	0	–	0	–	2	–	2	.500
Stony Brook	0	–	0	–	2	–	2	.500
Hofstra	0	–	0	–	2	–	3	.400
Campbell	0	–	0	–	1	–	3	.250
Hampton	0	–	0	–	1	–	3	.250
Monmouth	0	–	0	–	1	–	3	.250
† 2027 CAA tournament winner As of November 19, 2026; Rankings from AP poll

The 2026–27 Drexel Dragons men's basketball team represents Drexel University during the 2026–27 NCAA Division I men's basketball season. The Dragons, led by eleventh-year head coach Zach Spiker, play their home games at the Daskalakis Athletic Center in Philadelphia, Pennsylvania as members of the Coastal Athletic Association (CAA).

== Previous season ==
The Dragons finished the 2025–26 season 17–16, 10–8 in CAA play, to finish in fifth place. They lost to Monmouth in the CAA tournament quarterfinals.

== Offseason ==
=== Departures ===
Departures
Name	No.	Pos.	Height	Weight	Year	Hometown	Reason for departure
Horace Simmons	00	F	6'6"	215	Sophomore	Glenside, PA	Transferred
Victor Panov	1	F	6'7"	230	Senior	Saint Petersburg, Russia	Graduated
Kevon Vanderhorst	3	G	6'2"	180	Junior	Raleigh, NC	Transferred to Iona
Shane Blakeney	4	G	6'5"	200	RS Junior	Rock Hill, SC	Transferred to South Carolina
Eli Beard	7	G	5'11"	160	Graduate	Big Sandy, TX	
Garfield Turner	13	F	6'8"	250	RS senior	Gaithersburg, MD	Graduated
Villiam Garcia Adsten	22	G	6'8"	225	Junior	Stockholm, Sweden	Transferred to Maine
Ignacio Campoy Galvez	24	F	6'7"	210	Freshman	Madrid, Spain	Left Team

=== Incoming transfers ===
College recruiting
Name	Hometown	School	Height	Weight	Commit date
Panagiotis Pagonis; F	Athens, Greece	New Orleans	6 ft 9 in (2.06 m)	220 lb (100 kg)	May 4, 2026
Panagiotis Pagonis; F	Recruit ratings: Rivals: On3:				
LaDricus Pittman; G	Memphis, TN	LeMoyne–Owen College	6 ft 0 in (1.83 m)	165 lb (75 kg)	Jun 13, 2026
LaDricus Pittman; G	Recruit ratings: No ratings found				
Amaree Abram; G	Port Arthur, TX	Tennessee	6 ft 3 in (1.91 m)	200 lb (91 kg)	Oct 8, 2026
Amaree Abram; G	Recruit ratings: Rivals: 247Sports: On3: ESPN:				
Overall recruit ranking:
Note: In many cases, Scout, Rivals, 247Sports, On3, and ESPN may conflict in their listings of height and weight.; In these cases, the average was taken. ESPN grades are on a 100-point scale.; Sources: "Drexel 2026 Basketball Commitments". Rivals.; "Drexel Dragons". ESPN.; "2026 Team Ranking". Rivals.; "Drexel 2026 Basketball Commits". 247Sports.

=== Recruiting class ===
==== 2026 recruiting class ====
College recruiting
Name	Hometown	School	Height	Weight	Commit date
Latief Lorenzano-White; SF	Philadelphia, PA	Imhotep Institute Charter High School	6 ft 5 in (1.96 m)	N/A	Sep 25, 2025
Latief Lorenzano-White; SF	Recruit ratings: No ratings found				
B.J. Brown; SG	Sumter, SC	Sumter High School	6 ft 5 in (1.96 m)	N/A	Sep 29, 2025
B.J. Brown; SG	Recruit ratings: No ratings found				
Tre Paulding; SG	Lee's Summit, MO	Lee's Summit North High School	6 ft 5 in (1.96 m)	200 lb (91 kg)	Oct 2, 2025
Tre Paulding; SG	Recruit ratings: On3:				
Adrian Petkovic; PG	Cuxhaven, Germany	Kaiser-Heinrich-Gymnasium Bamberg	6 ft 2 in (1.88 m)	185 lb (84 kg)	Jun 18, 2026
Adrian Petkovic; PG	Recruit ratings: No ratings found				
David Simonovic; C	Le Blanc-Mesnil, France	Le Mans Sarthe Basket	6 ft 10 in (2.08 m)	230 lb (100 kg)	Jul 14, 2026
David Simonovic; C	Recruit ratings: No ratings found				
Overall recruit ranking:
Note: In many cases, Scout, Rivals, 247Sports, On3, and ESPN may conflict in their listings of height and weight.; In these cases, the average was taken. ESPN grades are on a 100-point scale.; Sources: "Drexel 2026 Basketball Commitments". Rivals.; "Drexel Dragons". ESPN.; "2026 Team Ranking". Rivals.; "Drexel 2026 Basketball Commits". 247Sports.; "2026 Drexel Dragons Basketball Commits". On3.

==== 2027 recruiting class ====
College recruiting (2027)
Name	Hometown	School	Height	Weight	Commit date
Caleb Lundy; PG	Warminster, Pennsylvania	Archbishop Wood HS	6 ft 4 in (1.93 m)	170 lb (77 kg)	Aug 13, 2026
Caleb Lundy; PG	Recruit ratings: Rivals: 247Sports: ESPN:				
Overall recruit ranking: 247Sports: 31 On3: 25
Note: In many cases, Scout, Rivals, 247Sports, On3, and ESPN may conflict in their listings of height and weight.; In these cases, the average was taken. ESPN grades are on a 100-point scale.; Sources: "Drexel Dragons". ESPN. Archived from the original on August 14, 2026.; "2027 Team Ranking". Rivals.; "Drexel 2027 Basketball Commits". 247Sports. Archived from the original on August 14, 2026.; "2027 Drexel Dragons Basketball Commits". On3. Archived from the original on August 14, 2026.

== Roster ==
2026–27 Drexel Dragons men's basketball team
Players
Coaches

Pos.	#	Name	Height	Weight	Year	Previous school	Hometown
G	0	Moses Hipps	6 ft 4 in (1.93 m)	180 lb (82 kg)	RS So	AZ Compass Prep/Boise State	Voorhees, NJ
G/F	1	Latief Lorenzano-White	6 ft 4 in (1.93 m)	188 lb (85 kg)	Fr	Imhotep Institute Charter HS	Philadelphia, PA
G/F	2	B.J. Brown Jr.	6 ft 6 in (1.98 m)	200 lb (91 kg)	Fr	Sumter HS	Columbia, SC
G	3	LaDricus Pittman	6 ft 0 in (1.83 m)	165 lb (75 kg)	Sr	Whitehaven HS/LeMoyne–Owen	Memphis, TN
C	4	David Simonovic	6 ft 10 in (2.08 m)	230 lb (104 kg)	Fr	Le Mans Sarthe Basket	Le Blanc-Mesnil, France
G	5	Josh Reed	6 ft 2 in (1.88 m)	200 lb (91 kg)	Jr	Archbishop Wood HS	Wyndmoor, PA
F	6	Clem Edomwonyin	6 ft 9 in (2.06 m)	225 lb (102 kg)	Jr	London Academy	East London, England
F	11	Martin de Laporterie	7 ft 1 in (2.16 m)	210 lb (95 kg)	Sr	Central Pointe/Yavapai College	Bordeaux, France
G/F	13	Tre Paulding III	6 ft 5 in (1.96 m)	215 lb (98 kg)	Fr	Lee's Summit North HS	Kansas City, MO
G	15	Adrian Petkovic	6 ft 2 in (1.88 m)	185 lb (84 kg)	Fr	Kaiser-Heinrich-Gymnasium	Cuxhaven, Germany
G	23	Dillon Tingler	6 ft 7 in (2.01 m)	175 lb (79 kg)	Jr	Huntington Prep/Eastern Michigan	Hurricane, WV
G	25	Max Davis (W)	6 ft 4 in (1.93 m)	200 lb (91 kg)	RS Sr	IMG Academy	New York, NY
G	30	Amaree Abram	6 ft 3 in (1.91 m)	200 lb (91 kg)	RS Sr	Southern California Academy/Tennessee	Port Arthur, TX
C	33	Ralph Akuta	7 ft 1 in (2.16 m)	285 lb (129 kg)	Jr	Hargrave Military Academy	Ijamsville, MD
F	99	Panagiotis Pagonis	6 ft 9 in (2.06 m)	220 lb (100 kg)	So	Massanutten Military Academy/New Orleans	Athens, Greece

Head coach

- Zach Spiker (Ithaca)

Assistant coach(es)

- Paul Fortier (Washington)
- Frantz Massenat (Drexel)
- Tim Brooks (James Madison)
- Nat Graham (Penn)

Legend

- (C) Team captain
- (S) Suspended
- (I) Ineligible
- (W) Walk-on
- Injured
- Current redshirt

Roster
Last update: October 8, 2026

== Schedule and results ==
Date time, TV	Rank^{#}	Opponent^{#}	Result	Record	High points	High rebounds	High assists	Site (attendance) city, state
Exhibition
October 14, 2026; 6:00 pm, ESPN+		at St. John's	L 52-81		8 – Tied	6 – Tied	3 – Tied	Carnesecca Arena (5,260); Queens, NY
October 22, 2026; 7:00 pm		at Lafayette	L 58-83		12 – Reed	7 – Reed	3 – Reed	Kirby Sports Center; Easton, PA
October 26, 2026; 7:00 pm		Penn State	L 57-68		15 – Reed	11 – Reed	2 – Tied	Daskalakis Athletic Center (1,307); Philadelphia, PA
Non-conference regular season
November 3, 2026*; 7:30 pm, ACCN		at No. 9 Virginia	L 60-89	0-1	11 – Tied	4 – Tied	4 – Tied	John Paul Jones Arena (12,487); Charlottesville, VA
November 7, 2026*; 2:00 pm, FloSports		at Colgate	W 77-74	1-1	14 – Pagonis	7 – Simonovich	6 – Pittmann	Daskalakis Athletic Center (1,228); Philadelphia, PA
November 11, 2026*; 7:00 pm, FloSports		at American	L 64-66	1-2	18 – Lorenzano-White	3 – Lorenzano-White	4 – Pagonis	Daskalakis Athletic Center (1,130); Philadelphia, PA
November 14, 2026*; 1:00 pm, ESPN+		at Maine	W 66-64	2-2	–	–	–	Memorial Gymnasium (993); Orono, ME
November 20, 2026*; 7:00 pm, NBCSP		Saint Joseph's; Big 5 Classic Pod 2						Daskalakis Athletic Center; Philadelphia, PA
November 24, 2026*; 8:00 pm, NBCSP/ESPN+		at Penn; Big 5 Classic Pod 2, Battle of 33rd Street						Palestra; Philadelphia, PA
November 28, 2026*; 4:00 pm, ESPN+		at Mount St. Mary's						Knott Arena; Emmitsburg, MD
December 1, 2026*; 7:00 pm		at Old Dominion						Chartway Arena; Norfolk, VA
December 5, 2026*		vs. Big 5 Classic						Xfinity Mobile Arena; Philadelphia, PA
December 13, 2026*; 4:00 pm, ESPN+		at NJIT						Wellness and Events Center; Newark, NJ
December 15, 2026*; 7:00 pm, ACCN		at Pittsburgh						Petersen Events Center; Pittsburgh, PA
December 19, 2026*; 4:00 pm, NBCSP		Albany						Daskalakis Athletic Center; Philadelphia, PA
December 22, 2026*; 6:00 pm, NBCSP		Norfolk State						Daskalakis Athletic Center; Philadelphia, PA
December 28, 2026*; 12:00 pm, FloSports		Cairn						Daskalakis Athletic Center; Philadelphia, PA
CAA regular season
December 31, 2026; 2:00 pm, CBSSN		at William & Mary						Kaplan Arena; Williamsburg, VA
January 2, 2027; 2:00 pm, FloSports		at Hampton						Hampton Convocation Center; Hampton, VA
January 7, 2027; 6:00 pm, CBSSN		Charleston						Daskalakis Athletic Center; Philadelphia, PA
January 14, 2027; 7:00 pm, NBCSP		Northeastern						Daskalakis Athletic Center; Philadelphia, PA
January 16, 2027; 2:00 pm, FloSports		at Monmouth						OceanFirst Bank Center; West Long Branch, NJ
January 18, 2027; 7:00 pm, FloSports		at Hofstra						Mack Sports Complex; Hempstead, NY
January 23, 2027; 2:00 pm, FloSports		North Carolina A&T						Daskalakis Athletic Center; Philadelphia, PA
January 28, 2027; 7:00 pm, NBCSP		Towson						Daskalakis Athletic Center; Philadelphia, PA
January 30, 2027; 8:30 pm, CBSSN		at Stony Brook						Stony Brook Arena; Stony Brook, NY
February 4, 2027; 7:00 pm, FloSports		at Northeastern						Cabot Center; Boston, MA
February 6, 2027; 9:00 pm, CBSSN		Monmouth						Daskalakis Athletic Center; Philadelphia, PA
February 11, 2027; 7:00 pm, FloSports		at Campbell						Gore Arena; Buies Creek, NC
February 13, 2027; 2:00 pm, FloSports		at North Carolina A&T						Corbett Sports Center; Greensboro, NC
February 18, 2027; 7:00 pm, NBCSP		UNC Wilmington						Daskalakis Athletic Center; Philadelphia, PA
February 20, 2027; 4:00 pm, NBCSP		Elon						Daskalakis Athletic Center; Philadelphia, PA
February 25, 2027; 7:00 pm, FloSports		Stony Brook						Daskalakis Athletic Center; Philadelphia, PA
February 27, 2027; 2:00 pm, NBCSP		Hofstra						Daskalakis Athletic Center; Philadelphia, PA
March 2, 2027; 7:00 pm, FloSports		at Towson						SECU Arena; Towson, MD
CAA tournament
March 5-9, 2027; FloSports		vs.						CareFirst Arena; Washington, D.C.
*Non-conference game. ^{#}Rankings from AP. (#) Tournament seedings in parentheses. All times are in Eastern.

== See also ==
- 2026–27 Drexel Dragons women's basketball team
