= Assumption University =

Assumption University may refer to:

- Assumption University (Worcester), Massachusetts, United States
- Assumption University (Windsor, Ontario), a federated college of University of Windsor, Canada
- Assumption University of Thailand
- University of the Assumption, Philippines

== See also ==
- Assumption College (disambiguation)
