= Kevin Hovde =

American basketball coach (born 1988)

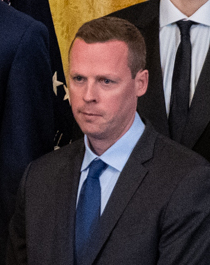
- Hovde with Florida in 2025

Current position
- Title: Head coach
- Team: Columbia
- Conference: Ivy League
- Record: 20–13 (.606)

Biographical details
- Born: June 20, 1988 (age 38)

Playing career
- 2006–2011: Richmond

Coaching career (HC unless noted)
- 2012–2016: Columbia (assistant)
- 2016–2019: San Francisco (assistant)
- 2019–2021: San Francisco (associate head coach)
- 2021–2022: Richmond (assistant)
- 2022–2025: Florida (assistant)
- 2025–present: Columbia

Administrative career (AD unless noted)
- 2011–2012: Columbia (DBO)

Head coaching record
- Overall: 20–13 (.606)

Accomplishments and honors

Championships
- As assistant: NCAA Division I tournament (2025)

Kevin Hovde (born June 20, 1988) is an American college basketball coach who is currently the head coach of the Columbia Lions men's basketball team.

== Early life and playing career ==
Hovde grew up in Kennett Square, Pennsylvania and attended Unionville High School. He averaged 21.5 points, 6 rebounds, 7 assists, and 3 blocks as a senior. Hovde played college basketball at Richmond, joining the team as a walk-on. He earned a scholarship at the end of his freshman season.

== Coaching career ==
Hovde began his coaching career as the director of basketball operations at Columbia on the staff of Lions' head coach Kyle Smith in 2011. He was promoted to an assistant coach position after one season. Hovde left Columbia to take an assistant coaching position with San Francisco in 2016 after Smith was hired as the Dons' head coach. Following Smith's departure to Washington State, he was promoted to associate head coach by new head coach Todd Golden. Hovde left USF to become an assistant at his alma mater, Richmond, in 2021. Hovde was hired as an assistant at Florida as part of Golden's inaugural staff one season later.

On March 24, 2025, Hovde was named the next head coach at Columbia, replacing Jim Engles.

== Head coaching record ==
Record table
Season	Team	Overall	Conference	Standing	Postseason
Columbia Lions (Ivy League) (2025–present)
2025–26	Columbia	16–12	5–9	T–5th	
2026–27	Columbia	4–1	0–0		
Columbia:		20–13 (.606)	5–9 (.357)		
Total:		20–13 (.606)			
National champion Postseason invitational champion Conference regular season champion Conference regular season and conference tournament champion Division regular season champion Division regular season and conference tournament champion Conference tournament champion

== Personal life ==
Hovde's brother-in-law, Dave Klatsky, is an assistant coach at Florida and is the former head coach of the NYU Violets.
