= Eric Reveno =

American college basketball coach (born 1966)

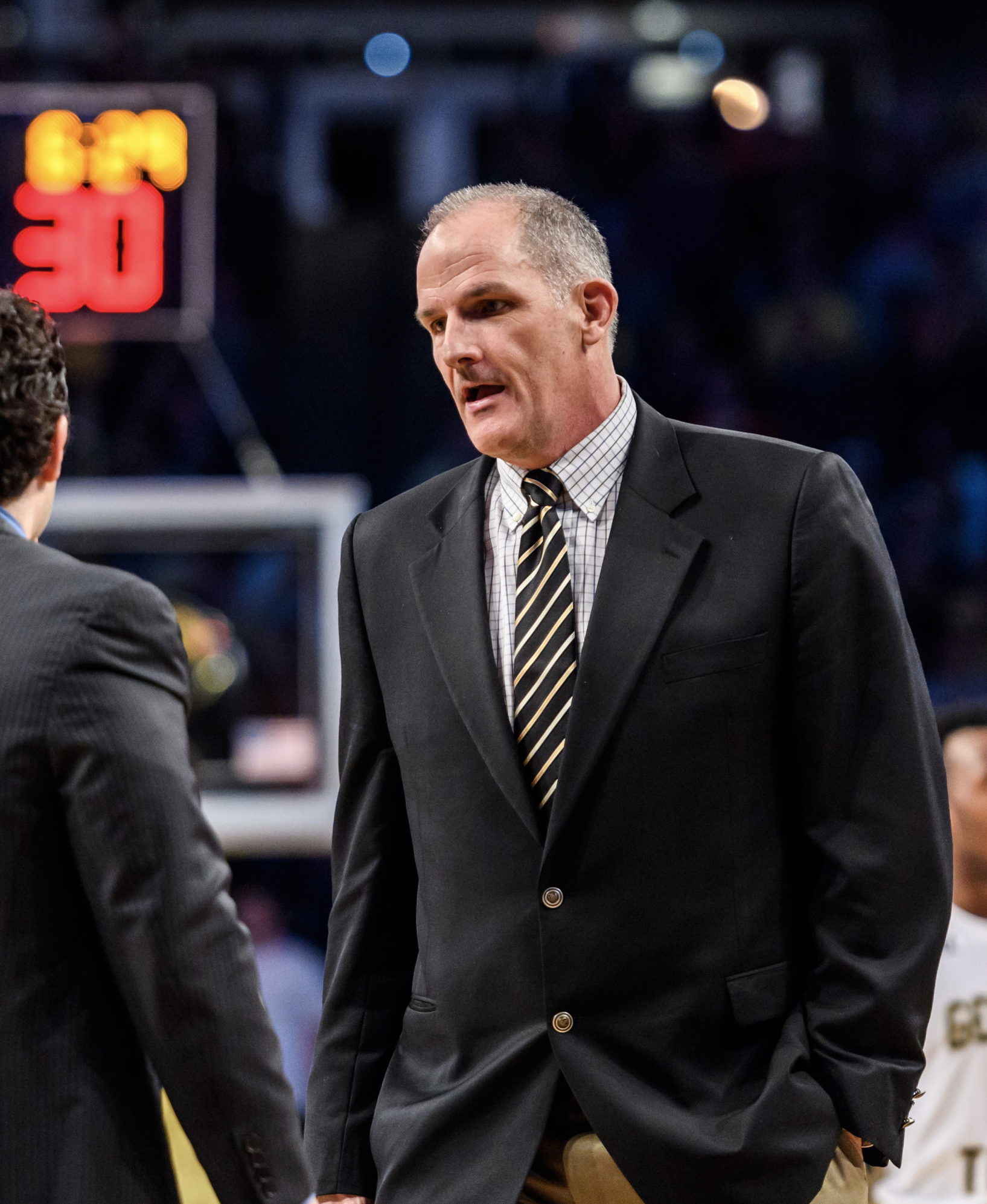
- Reveno in 2020

Current position
- Title: Head coach
- Team: Brown
- Conference: Ivy
- Record: 2–4 (.333)

Biographical details
- Born: March 12, 1966 (age 60); Stanford, California, U.S.

Playing career
- 1985–1989: Stanford

Coaching career (HC unless noted)
- 1997–2004: Stanford (assistant)
- 2005–2006: Stanford (associate HC)
- 2006–2016: Portland
- 2016–2022: Georgia Tech (assistant)
- 2022–2024: Oregon State (associate HC)
- 2024–2026: Stanford (associate HC / GM)
- 2026–present: Brown

Head coaching record
- Overall: 142–182 (.438)
- Tournaments: 0–4 (CIT)

Accomplishments and honors

Awards
- WCC Coach of the Year (2009)

Eric Wendell Reveno (born March 12, 1966) is an American college basketball coach who is the head men's basketball coach for Brown Bears of the Ivy League. He previously served as the head men's basketball coach at Portland.

== Coaching career ==
Reveno played professionally for Nippon Mining in Japan from 1989 to 1993. His coaching career began as an assistant coach at his alma mater, Stanford University, where he had played collegiately as a starting center.

=== Portland (2006–2016) ===
Reveno was the head coach of the University of Portland from 2006 to 2016. He was named the West Coast Conference coach of the year for the 2008–09 season after a third-place finish in conference. Reveno was fired as Portland's head coach on March 15, 2016, after ten years and a 140–178 record.

=== Return to assistant coaching (2016–2026) ===
In May 2016, Reveno was hired as an assistant at Georgia Tech to be part of the staff for head coach Josh Pastner. At Georgia Tech he was credited with developing Ben Lammers into an All-ACC player and ACC Defensive Player of the Year.

In April 2022, Reveno became the associate head coach at Oregon State.

In April 2024, Reveno returned to Stanford as the James C. Gaither Associate Head Coach. In June 2025 he was also named as the program's General Manager.

=== Brown (2026–present) ===
On July 24, 2026, Reveno was named the "Men's Basketball Head Coaching Chair" at Brown, becoming the 32nd head coach in program history.

== Head coaching record ==
Record table
Season	Team	Overall	Conference	Standing	Postseason
Portland Pilots (West Coast Conference) (2006–2016)
2006–07	Portland	9–23	4–10	T–7th	
2007–08	Portland	9–22	3–11	7th	
2008–09	Portland	19–13	9–5	3rd	CIT First Round
2009–10	Portland	21–11	10–4	3rd	CIT First Round
2010–11	Portland	20–12	7–7	5th	CIT First Round
2011–12	Portland	7–24	3–13	8th	
2012–13	Portland	11–21	4–12	T–7th	
2013–14	Portland	15–16	7–11	6th	
2014–15	Portland	17–16	7–11	T–6th	CIT First Round
2015–16	Portland	12–20	6–12	T–7th	
Portland:		140–178 (.440)	60–96 (.385)		
Brown Bears (Ivy League) (2026–present)
2026–27	Brown	2–4	0–0		
Brown:		2–4(.333)	0–0 (–)		
Total:		142–182 (.438)			
