= 2026–27 Charleston Cougars men's basketball team =

American college basketball season

2026–27 Charleston Cougars men's basketball
- Conference: Coastal Athletic Association
- Record: 4–1 (0–0 CAA)
- Head coach: John Groce (1st season)
- Assistant coaches: Aaron Fearne; Rob Fulford; Jonathan Holmes Robby Pridgen Mike Allen
- Home arena: TD Arena

2026–27 CAA men's basketball standings
| | Conf. | | | | Overall |
| Team | W | | L | PCT | W | | L | PCT |
|---|---|---|---|---|---|---|---|---|
| Charleston | 0 | – | 0 | – | 4 | – | 1 | .800 |
| UNC Wilmington | 0 | – | 0 | – | 4 | – | 1 | .800 |
| Towson | 0 | – | 0 | – | 3 | – | 3 | .500 |
| North Carolina A&T | 0 | – | 0 | – | 3 | – | 2 | .600 |
| William & Mary | 0 | – | 0 | – | 3 | – | 2 | .600 |
| Drexel | 0 | – | 0 | – | 2 | – | 2 | .500 |
| Stony Brook | 0 | – | 0 | – | 2 | – | 2 | .500 |
| Elon | 0 | – | 0 | – | 2 | – | 3 | .400 |
| Hofstra | 0 | – | 0 | – | 2 | – | 3 | .400 |
| Northeastern | 0 | – | 0 | – | 2 | – | 3 | .400 |
| Hampton | 0 | – | 0 | – | 1 | – | 3 | .250 |
| Monmouth | 0 | – | 0 | – | 1 | – | 3 | .250 |
| Campbell | 0 | – | 0 | – | 1 | – | 4 | .200 |
† 2027 CAA tournament winner As of November 20, 2026; Rankings from AP poll

The 2026–27 Charleston Cougars men's basketball team will represent the College of Charleston in the 2026–27 NCAA Division I men's basketball season. The Cougars, led by first-year head coach John Groce, will play their home games at TD Arena in Charleston, South Carolina as a member of the Coastal Athletic Association.

== Previous season ==
The Cougars, led by second-year head coach Chris Mack, finished the season 21–11, 14–4 in CAA play to finish in second place. The team was defeated by Towson in the quarterfinals of the CAA Tournament.

After the season head coach Chris Mack left the program to coach at the University of South Florida, and John Groce was later hired as the 26th coach in Charleston history.

== Roster ==
2025–26 College of Charleston Cougars men's basketball team
Players
Coaches

| Pos. | # | Name | Height | Weight | Year | Previous school | Hometown |
|---|---|---|---|---|---|---|---|
| G | 0 | Xavier Abreu | 6 ft 4 in (1.93 m) | 180 lb (82 kg) | So | Northeastern | Lynn, MA |
| G | 1 | Conner Groce | 6 ft 1 in (1.85 m) | 170 lb (77 kg) | RS So | Akron | Champaign, IL |
| G | 2 | Kobe Edwards | 6 ft 2 in (1.88 m) | — | Fr | Greenfield School | Wilson, NC |
| G | 3 | Ben Bradford | 6 ft 5 in (1.96 m) | 200 lb (91 kg) | Jr | Charlotte | Gaithersburg, MD |
| G | 4 | Đorđe Ćurčić | 6 ft 3 in (1.91 m) | 190 lb (86 kg) | Sr | Saint Louis | Čačak, Serbia |
| G | 5 | Martin Kalu | 6 ft 6 in (1.98 m) | 210 lb (95 kg) | So | Löwen Braunschweig | Quakenbrück, Germany |
| G | 7 | AJ Fowler | 6 ft 5 in (1.96 m) | 160 lb (73 kg) | So | Jackson Hole HS | Fayetteville, AR |
| G | 8 | Tavari Johnson | 6 ft 0 in (1.83 m) | 180 lb (82 kg) | GS | Akron | La Grange Park, IL |
| F | 9 | Trey Scott III | 6 ft 11 in (2.11 m) | 225 lb (102 kg) | RS So | Georgia State | Atlanta, GA |
| G | 10 | Max Green | 6 ft 7 in (2.01 m) | 190 lb (86 kg) | Jr | Northwestern | La Grange, KY |
| C | 11 | Braden Pierce | 7 ft 0 in (2.13 m) | 245 lb (111 kg) | RS So | Villanova | Woodstock, GA |
| G | 15 | Eli Ellis | 6 ft 0 in (1.83 m) | 195 lb (88 kg) | So | South Carolina | Hickory, NC |
| F | 18 | Nicolo Virginio | 6 ft 9 in (2.06 m) | 220 lb (100 kg) | Jr | VL Pallacanestro | Varese, Italy |
| F | 23 | Will Mortimore | 6 ft 10 in (2.08 m) | 220 lb (100 kg) | RS So | Colorado Mesa | Maitland, Australia |
| G | 24 | JaShawn Ladd | 6 ft 4 in (1.93 m) | — | Fr | Ben Davis HS | Indianapolis, IN |

Head coach

- John Groce (Taylor)

Assistant coach(es)

- Aaron Fearne (Mayville State)
- Rob Fulford (Marshall)
- Jonathan Holmes (North Carolina)
- Robby Pridgen (Roanoke)
- Mike Allen (Ohio)

Legend

- (C) Team captain
- (S) Suspended
- (I) Ineligible
- (W) Walk-on
- Injured
- Current redshirt

Roster
Last update: August 27. 2026

== Schedule and results ==
| Date time, TV | Rank^{#} | Opponent^{#} | Result | Record | High points | High rebounds | High assists | Site (attendance) city, state |
Exhibition
| September 27, 2026*; 2:00 p.m., ESPN+ | | vs. The Citadel; LinkU Invitational | W 69–59 | 0–0 | 16 – Ellis | 9 – Green | 2 – Ellis | Credit One Stadium; Daniel Island, SC |
| October 25, 2026*; 4:00 p.m. | | Furman | W 89–83 | 0–0 | 15 – Bradford | 6 – Tied | 5 – Tied | TD Arena; Charleston, SC |
Non-conference regular season
| November 2, 2026*; 7:30 p.m., FloHoops | | Southern Wesleyan | W 111–55 | 1–0 | 16 – Ellis | 9 – Kalu | 7 – Johnson | TD Arena (4,377); Charleston, SC |
| November 6, 2026*; 7:00 p.m., FloHoops | | Newberry | W 112–66 | 2–0 | 20 – Johnson | 7 – Ellis | 5 – Pierce | TD Arena (4,995); Charleston, SC |
| November 11, 2026*; 6:30p.m., ESPN+ | | at Temple | W 91–81 | 3–0 | 32 – Johnson | 8 – Bradford | 4 – Mortimore | Liacouras Center (2,502); Philadelphia, PA |
| November 15, 2026*; 2:00 p.m., FloHoops | | South Carolina State | W 90–66 | 4–0 | 20 – Johnson | 9 – Kalu | 4 – Ellis | TD Arena (4,601); Charleston, SC |
| November 19, 2026*; 7:30 p.m., ESPN+ | | at Drake | L 70–86 | 4–1 | 16 – Tied | 7 – Tied | 8 – Johnson | Knapp Center (3,507); Des Moines, IA |
| November 24, 2026*; 8:30 p.m., FloHoops | | vs. UTEP; Cancún Challenge | | | | | | Hard Rock Hotel Riviera Maya; Cancún, Mexico |
| November 25, 2025* - | | vs. Eastern Michigan/Kennesaw State; Cancún Challenge | | | | | | Hard Rock Hotel Riviera Maya; Cancún, Mexico |
| November 29, 2026*; 2:00 p.m., FloHoops | | Howard | | | | | | TD Arena; Charleston, SC |
| December 2, 2026*; 8:00 p.m. | | at Charlotte | | | | | | Dale F. Halton Arena; Charlotte, NC |
| December 6, 2026*; 2:00 p.m., FloHoops | | Davidson | | | | | | TD Arena; Charleston, SC |
| December 9, 2026*; 7:00 p.m., FloHoops | | Voorhees | | | | | | TD Arena; Charleston, SC |
| December 14, 2026*; 7:30 p.m., ESPN+ | | at Belmont | | | | | | Curb Event Center; Nashville, TN |
| December 18, 2026*; 7:00 p.m., FloHoops | | Northern Colorado; Cancún Challenge | | | | | | TD Arena; Charleston, SC |
| December 22, 2026*; 7:00 p.m., FloHoops | | South Florida | | | | | | TD Arena; Charleston, SC |
CAA regular season
| December 31, 2026; 4:00 p.m., CBSSN | | Northeastern | | | | | | TD Arena; Charleston, SC |
| January 2, 2027; 4:00 p.m., FloHoops | | North Carolina A&T | | | | | | TD Arena; Charleston, SC |
| January 7, 2027; 6:00 p.m., CBSSN | | at Drexel | | | | | | Daskalakis Athletic Center; Philadelphia, PA |
| January 9, 2027; 1:00 p.m., FloHoops | | at Monmouth | | | | | | OceanFirst Bank Center; West Long Branch, NJ |
| January 14, 2027; 7:00 p.m., FloHoops | | Campbell | | | | | | TD Arena; Charleston, SC |
| January 16, 2027; 2:00 p.m., FloHoops | | at North Carolina A&T | | | | | | Corbett Sports Center; Greensboro, NC |
| January 18, 2027; 7:00 p.m., FloHoops | | Towson | | | | | | TD Arena; Charleston, SC |
| January 23, 2027; 4:00 p.m., FloHoops | | Elon | | | | | | TD Arena; Charleston, SC |
| January 28, 2027; 6:30 p.m., CBSSN | | at UNC Wilmington | | | | | | Trask Coliseum; Wilmington, NC |
| January 30, 2027; 2:00 p.m., FloHoops | | Hofstra | | | | | | TD Arena; Charleston, SC |
| February 4, 2027; 7:00 p.m., FloHoops | | at Hampton | | | | | | Hampton Convocation Center; Hampton, VA |
| February 6, 2027; 12:00 p.m., CBSSN | | at William & Mary | | | | | | Kaplan Arena; Williamsburg, VA |
| February 11, 2027; 7:00 p.m., CBSSN | | Stony Brook | | | | | | TD Arena; Charleston, SC |
| February 18, 2027; 7:00 p.m., FloHoops | | at Hofstra | | | | | | Mack Sports Complex; Hempstead, NY |
| February 20, 2027; 1:00 p.m., FloHoops | | at Northeastern | | | | | | Cabot Center; Boston, MA |
| February 25, 2027; 7:00 p.m., FloHoops | | Hampton | | | | | | TD Arena; Charleston, SC |
| February 27, 2027; 4:00 p.m., CBSSN | | UNC Wilmington | | | | | | TD Arena; Charleston, SC |
| March 2, 2027; 7:00 p.m., FloHoops | | at Campbell | | | | | | Gore Arena; Buies Creek, NC |
CAA tournament
| March, 2027; FloHoops | | vs. TBD; Quarterfinals | | | | | | CareFirst Arena; Washington, D.C. |
*Non-conference game. ^{#}Rankings from AP Poll. (#) Tournament seedings in parentheses. All times are in Eastern.
