= Dartmouth Big Green men's basketball =

College men's basketball team representing Dartmouth College

2026–27 Dartmouth Big Green men's basketball team
- University: Dartmouth College
- Head coach: Brett MacConnell (1st season)
- Location: Hanover, New Hampshire
- Arena: Leede Arena (capacity: 2,100)
- Conference: Ivy League
- Nickname: Big Green
- Colors: Dartmouth green and white

NCAA Division I tournament runner-up
- 1942, 1944
Other NCAA Division I tournament results
Final Four	1942, 1944
Elite Eight	1958
Sweet Sixteen	1956, 1958
Appearances	1941, 1942, 1943, 1944, 1956, 1958, 1959

Pre-tournament Helms national champions
- 1906

Conference regular-season champions
- 1927, 1938, 1939, 1940, 1941, 1942, 1943, 1944, 1946, 1956, 1958, 1959

Uniforms
Home	Away	Alternate

The Dartmouth Big Green men's basketball program is the intercollegiate men's basketball program of Dartmouth College in Hanover, New Hampshire. The program is classified in the NCAA Division I and the team competes in the Ivy League. They play their home games at Leede Arena and are coached by Brett MacConnell.

== History ==
The Big Green have appeared in the NCAA tournament seven times, with two national championship game appearances. Dartmouth has not participated in an NCAA Tournament since 1959, however, the longest active streak in between appearances and the second-longest ever. (Note: Due to the Big Green not playing the 2020-21 season alongside the rest of the Ivy League due to continued COVID-19 concerns, the 2024-25 season was the 65th season since 1959 in which Dartmouth has failed to reach the NCAA Tournament rather than the 66th.) Since their 1959 tournament appearance, the team has had eleven winning seasons and participated in one non-Ivy postseason tournament, the 2015 CollegeInsider.com Postseason Tournament.

The team's most significant recent non-conference victories include Buffalo in 2019 (the Bulls' first game since finishing the 2018-2019 season ranked #15 by The Associated Press), Georgetown in 2021, UTSA in 2022, and Boston College in 2024.

Like the rest of the Ivy League, the Big Green did not compete during the 2020-2021 college basketball season. In the 2024–25 season, the Big Green went 14–13 (8–6 in Ivy play) and made their first ever Ivy League men's basketball tournament when they finished 3rd in the regular season. They lost to Cornell in the Semifinal game by a score of 87–71.

=== Unionization ===
In September 2023, all 15 members of the team signed a petition to join the Service Employees International Union Local 560 chapter. In February 2024, a National Labor Relations Board regional official ruled that Dartmouth basketball players are employees of the school and allowed for a union election. The decision would allow players to negotiate salary and working conditions. In December 2024, the team withdrew their unionization attempt. The team cited the election of Donald Trump in the 2024 presidential election and stated that a Republican-controlled National Labor Relations Board could set a precedent that would harm future college sports unionization efforts.

== Postseason results ==
=== NCAA tournament results ===
Dartmouth's overall record in the NCAA tournament is 10–7.

Along with Kansas, Dartmouth was the first team to appear in multiple NCAA Tournaments after making their second appearance in the 1942 tournament. Dartmouth was also the first team to appear in consecutive NCAA tournaments.

Year	Round	Opponent	Result
1941	Quarterfinals; Regional 3rd Place	Wisconsin; North Carolina	L 50–51; W 60–59
1942	Quarterfinals; Semifinals; National Championship Game	Penn State; Kentucky; Stanford	W 44–39; W 47–28; L 38–53
1943	Quarterfinals; Regional 3rd Place	DePaul; NYU	L 35–46; W 51–49
1944	Quarterfinals; Semifinals; National Championship Game	Catholic; Ohio State; Utah	W 63–38; W 60–53; L 40–42^{OT}
1956	Regional Quarterfinals; Regional semifinals Regional 3rd-place game	West Virginia; Canisius; Connecticut	W 61–59^{OT} L 58–66; W 85–64
1958	Regional Quarterfinals; Regional semifinals Regional Finals	Connecticut; Manhattan; Temple	W 75–64; W 79–62; L 50–69
1959	Regional Quarterfinals	West Virginia	L 68–82

=== CIT results ===
The Big Green have appeared in the CollegeInsider.com Postseason Tournament (CIT) one time. Their record is 0–1.

Year	Round	Opponent	Result
2015	First round	Canisius	L 72–87
