= 2026–27 Brown Bears men's basketball team =

American college basketball season

2026–27 Brown Bears men's basketball
- Conference: Ivy League
- Record: 0–2 (0–0 Ivy)
- Head coach: Eric Reveno (1st season)
- Associate head coach: Tyson Wheeler; Doc Eslinger
- Assistant coach: Omar Lowery
- Home arena: Pizzitola Sports Center

2026–27 Ivy League men's basketball standings
	Conf.				Overall
Team	W		L	PCT	W		L	PCT
Harvard	0	–	0	–	2	–	0	1.000
Cornell	0	–	0	–	2	–	1	.667
Columbia	0	–	0	–	2	–	1	.667
Dartmouth	0	–	0	–	2	–	1	.667
Princeton	0	–	0	–	2	–	1	.667
Penn	0	–	0	–	1	–	1	.500
Yale	0	–	0	–	1	–	1	.500
Brown	0	–	0	–	1	–	2	.333
† 2027 Ivy League tournament winner As of November 10, 2026; Rankings from AP poll

The 2026–27 Brown Bears men's basketball team will represent Brown University during the 2026–27 NCAA Division I men's basketball season. The Bears, who will be led by first-year head coach Eric Reveno, will play their home games at the Pizzitola Sports Center located in Providence, Rhode Island, as members of the Ivy League.

== Previous season ==
The Bears finished the 2025–26 season 9–18, 3–11 in Ivy League play, finishing in eighth place. They failed to qualify for the Ivy League Tournament.

On July 13, 2026, it was announced that Mike Martin departed Brown and accepted a position as an assistant coach at the University of Michigan under new head coach Mike Boynton. On July 24, the school named former Stanford associate head coach Eric Reveno as their new head coach.

== Preseason ==
On October 12, 2026, the Ivy League released their preseason poll. Brown was picked to finish seventh in the conference.

=== Preseason rankings ===
Ivy League Preseason Poll
Place	Team	Votes
1	Penn	157 (11)
2	Harvard	146 (7)
3	Yale	133 (2)
4	Princeton	97 (1)
5	Cornell	82
6	Columbia	69
7	Brown	42
8	Dartmouth	30
(#) first-place votes

== Roster ==
2026–27 Brown Bears men's basketball team
Players
Coaches

Pos.	#	Name	Height	Weight	Year	Previous school	Hometown
G	0	Kenneth Francis Jr.	6 ft 4 in (1.93 m)	175 lb (79 kg)	Fr	Calvary Christian Academy	Fort Lauderdale, Florida
G	1	Isaiah Langham	6 ft 5 in (1.96 m)	210 lb (95 kg)	So	Belmont Hill School	Stoughton, Massachusetts
G	2	Jeremiah Jenkins	6 ft 0 in (1.83 m)	155 lb (70 kg)	Jr	Brewster Academy	New Britain, Connecticut
F	3	Logan Jones	6 ft 7 in (2.01 m)	200 lb (91 kg)	Fr	Potomac School	Bethesda, Maryland
G	4	Jonah Drezner	6 ft 3 in (1.91 m)	170 lb (77 kg)	So	Bishop Blanchet High School	Seattle, Washington
G	5	Adrian Uchidiuno	6 ft 2 in (1.88 m)	170 lb (77 kg)	Sr	Cushing Academy	Markham, Ontario
F	6	Wyatt DeGraaf	6 ft 10 in (2.08 m)	240 lb (109 kg)	Jr	Cary Academy	Durham, North Carolina
G	8	Rykan Woo	6 ft 1 in (1.85 m)	172 lb (78 kg)	Fr	DePaul College Prep	Chicago, Illinois
G	11	Jerrell Barron Jr.	6 ft 5 in (1.96 m)	190 lb (86 kg)	Jr	Atascocita High School	Atascocita, Texas
G	12	Malcolm Wrisby-Jefferson	6 ft 4 in (1.93 m)	195 lb (88 kg)	Sr	The Phelps School	Queens, New York
G	14	Luke Paragon	6 ft 4 in (1.93 m)	195 lb (88 kg)	Sr	Cicero–North Syracuse High School	Cicero, New York
F	15	Emmanuel Jamgbadi	6 ft 8 in (2.03 m)	240 lb (109 kg)	Fr	Prolific Prep	Edo, Nigeria
G	22	Timmy Bollin	6 ft 7 in (2.01 m)	215 lb (98 kg)	Fr	The Newman School	Raynham, Massachusetts
G/F	23	David Rochester	6 ft 8 in (2.03 m)	215 lb (98 kg)	Jr	South Lakes High School	Great Falls, Virginia
G	30	Brady Loughlin	6 ft 5 in (1.96 m)	200 lb (91 kg)	So	Don Bosco Prep	Wyckoff, New Jersey
F	33	Charlie O'Sullivan	6 ft 10 in (2.08 m)	230 lb (104 kg)	So	Loomis Chaffee School	Harrison, New York
G	42	Ray Cuevas	6 ft 3 in (1.91 m)	210 lb (95 kg)	Jr	Bowdoin	Ipswich, Massachusetts
F	45	N'famara Dabo	6 ft 8 in (2.03 m)	235 lb (107 kg)	Sr	Prolific Prep	Conakry, Guinea

Head coach

- Eric Reveno (Stanford)

Assistant coach(es)

- Tyson Wheeler (Fairfield)
- Doc Eslinger (Clark)
- Omar Lowery (Concordia)

Legend

- (C) Team captain
- (S) Suspended
- (I) Ineligible
- (W) Walk-on
- Injured
- Current redshirt

Roster
Last update: October 24, 2026

== Schedule and results ==
Date time, TV	Rank^{#}	Opponent^{#}	Result	Record	High points	High rebounds	High assists	Site (attendance) city, state
Non-conference regular season
November 2, 2026; 7:00 pm, ESPN+		New Hampshire	L 55–59	0–1	17 – Jenkins	9 – Dabo	3 – Jenkins	Pizzitola Sports Center (707); Providence, RI
November 6, 2026; 7:00 pm, NESN+/ESPN+		Boston University	L 67–72	0–2	13 – Dabo	7 – Bollin	7 – Jenkins	Pizzitola Sports Center (1,217); Providence, RI
November 8, 2026; 2:00 pm		at Lehigh						Stabler Arena; Bethlehem, PA
November 12, 2026; 7:00 pm, ESPN+		Canisius						Pizzitola Sports Center; Providence, RI
November 14, 2026; 7:00 pm		at Siena						MVP Arena; Albany, NY
November 18, 2026; 7:00 pm		at Holy Cross						Hart Center; Worcester, MA
November 21, 2026; 7:00 pm		at Vermont						Patrick Gym; Burlington, VT
November 25, 2026; 2:00 pm, ESPN+		Johnson & Wales						Pizzitola Sports Center; Providence, RI
November 28, 2026; 3:00 pm		at Air Force						Clune Arena; USAF Academy, CO
December 1, 2026; 7:00 pm		at Rhode Island						Ryan Center; Kingston, RI
December 4, 2026; 6:00 pm		at Bryant						Chace Athletic Center; Smithfield, RI
December 6, 2026; 3:30 pm		vs. Central Connecticut; Hall of Fame Classic						MassMutual Center; Springfield, MA
December 9, 2026; 6:00 pm		Wheaton						Pizzitola Sports Center; Providence, RI
December 22, 2026; 4:00 pm		Stony Brook						Pizzitola Sports Center; Providence, RI
December 29, 2026; 6:00 pm, NESN		Maine						Pizzitola Sports Center; Providence, RI
Ivy League regular season
January 4, 2027; 7:00 pm		at Yale						John J. Lee Amphitheater; New Haven, CT
January 8, 2027; 7:00 pm		Penn						Pizzitola Sports Center; Providence, RI
January 15, 2027; 6:00 pm		at Cornell						Newman Arena; Ithaca, NY
January 18, 2027; 2:00 pm		at Columbia						Levien Gymnasium; New York, NY
January 23, 2027; 2:00 pm		Princeton						Pizzitola Sports Center; Providence, RI
January 29, 2027; 7:00 pm		at Dartmouth						Leede Arena; Hanover, NH
January 30, 2027; 6:00 pm		at Harvard						Lavietes Pavilion; Cambridge, MA
February 5, 2027; 7:00 pm		Yale						Pizzitola Sports Center; Providence, RI
February 12, 2027; 7:00 pm		Dartmouth						Pizzitola Sports Center; Providence, RI
February 13, 2027; 6:00 pm		Harvard						Pizzitola Sports Center; Providence, RI
February 19, 2027; 2:00 pm		at Princeton						Jadwin Gymnasium; Princeton, NJ
February 26, 2027; 7:00 pm		Cornell						Pizzitola Sports Center; Providence, RI
February 27, 2027; 6:00 pm		Columbia						Pizzitola Sports Center; Providence, RI
March 5, 2027; 7:00 pm		at Penn						The Palestra; Philadelphia, PA
*Non-conference game. ^{#}Rankings from AP poll. (#) Tournament seedings in parentheses. All times are in Eastern.
