= Brett MacConnell =

American basketball coach (born 1986)

Current position
- Title: Head coach
- Team: Dartmouth
- Conference: Ivy League
- Record: 3–2 (.600)

Biographical details
- Born: 1986 or 1987 (age 39–40)
- Education: Rutgers ('08)

Coaching career (HC unless noted)
- 2008–2009: Delaware Valley (assistant)
- 2009–2010: Delaware Valley (AHC)
- 2010–2011: Holy Family (assistant)
- 2013–2018: Princeton (assistant)
- 2018–2025: Princeton (AHC)
- 2025–2026: Stanford (assistant)
- 2026–present: Dartmouth

Administrative career (AD unless noted)
- 2011–2012: Saint Peter's (DBO)
- 2012–2013: Princeton (DBO)

Head coaching record
- Overall: 3–2 (.600)

Brett MacConnell (born 1986 or 1987) is an American college basketball coach. He is currently the head coach for the Dartmouth Big Green men's basketball team. He previously worked as an assistant coach for the Delaware Valley Aggies, Holy Family Tigers, Saint Peter's Peacocks, Princeton Tigers and Stanford Cardinal.

== Early life ==
MacConnell is the son of Kevin MacConnell, who served as an administrator for the Rutgers Scarlet Knights. He decided he wanted to become a basketball coach at age 10. He attended Montgomery High School in New Jersey where he played soccer. After high school, MacConnell attended Rutgers University starting in 2004 and was a student manager with the basketball team from 2004 to 2008. He graduated in 2008 with a bachelor's degree in exercise science and sports studies.

== Coaching career ==
=== Assistant coach (2008–2026) ===
After MacConnell's graduation from Rutgers, he began working as an assistant basketball coach for the Delaware Valley Aggies in 2008. He served one season in that role before being promoted to associate head coach, then joined the Holy Family Tigers as assistant coach in 2010. After a year at Holy Family, MacConnell became the director of basketball operations for the Saint Peter's Peacocks for a season before joining the Princeton Tigers in that role in 2012. He was promoted to assistant coach at Princeton in 2013. Across 12 years at Princeton, MacConnell coached four players to Ivy League Player of the Year honors while helping recruit Tosan Evbuomwan and Devin Cannady, both of whom went on to play in the NBA. Nearly 20 players he coached played professionally, while he helped Princeton reach the Sweet 16 of the NCAA Tournament in 2023. In 2025, MacConnell left to become an assistant for the Stanford Cardinal.

=== Dartmouth (2026–present) ===
In March 2026, MacConnell was hired as the new head coach of the Dartmouth Big Green.

== Head coaching record ==
Record table
Season	Team	Overall	Conference	Standing	Postseason
Dartmouth Big Green (Ivy League) (2026–present)
2026–27	Dartmouth	3–2	0–0		
Dartmouth:		3–2 (.600)	0–0 (–)		
Total:		3–2 (.600)			
National champion Postseason invitational champion Conference regular season champion Conference regular season and conference tournament champion Division regular season champion Division regular season and conference tournament champion Conference tournament champion
