= 2026–27 Santa Clara Broncos men's basketball team =

American college basketball season

2026–27 Santa Clara Broncos men's basketball
- Conference: West Coast Conference
- Record: 5–1 (0–0 WCC)
- Head coach: Herb Sendek (11th season)
- Assistant coaches: Jason Ludwig; Ryan Madry; Will Burkett; Jackson Gion; Mitch Smith
- Home arena: Leavey Center

2026–27 West Coast Conference men's basketball standings
	Conf.				Overall
Team	W		L	PCT	W		L	PCT
Santa Clara	0	–	0	–	5	–	1	.833
Pacific	0	–	0	–	4	–	1	.800
Saint Mary's	0	–	0	–	4	–	1	.800
San Diego	0	–	0	–	4	–	1	.800
San Francisco	0	–	0	–	4	–	1	.800
Portland	0	–	0	–	4	–	2	.667
Seattle	0	–	0	–	3	–	2	.600
Loyola Marymount	0	–	0	–	2	–	3	.400
Pepperdine	0	–	0	–	2	–	3	.400
Denver	0	–	0	–	1	–	3	.250
† 2027 WCC tournament winner As of November 20, 2026; Rankings from AP poll

The 2026–27 Santa Clara Broncos men's basketball team will represent Santa Clara University during the 2026–27 NCAA Division I men's basketball season. The Broncos are set to be led by eleventh-year head coach Herb Sendek and will play their home games at the Leavey Center as members of the West Coast Conference.

== Previous season ==
The Broncos finished the 2025–26 season 26–9, 15–3 in WCC play to finish in third place. In the WCC tournament, they defeated Pacific and upset Saint Mary's to reach the Championship game for the first time since 2007 before falling to Gonzaga. The Broncos received an at-large bid to the NCAA tournament at the No. 10 seed in the Midwest region, their first appearance since 1996. There, they were defeated in the first round 89–84 in overtime by No. 7 seed Kentucky.

== Offseason ==
=== Departures ===
Santa Clara Departures
Name	Number	Pos.	Height	Weight	Year	Hometown	Reason for Departure
Brenton Knapper	0	G	6'0"	175	(redshirt) Senior	Ontario, California	Graduated
Christian Hammond	1	G	6'4"	195	(redshirt) Sophomore	Denver, Colorado	Transferred to NC State
Gehrig Normand	9	F	6'6"	190	(redshirt) Sophomore	North Richland Hills, Texas	Transferred to SMU
Bukky Oboye	12	C	7'1"	220	(redshirt) Sophomore	Sugar Land, Texas	Transferred to Auburn
Allen Graves	22	F	6'9"	225	(redshirt) Freshman	Ponchatoula, Louisiana	Declared for 2026 NBA draft; Selected 19th overall by the Toronto Raptors
Brendan Yarusso	50	G	6'1"	185	Senior	Lombard, Illinois	Walk-on; Graduated
Juan Reyna III	51	G	6'3"	190	Graduate student	San Antonio, Texas	Walk-on; Graduated
Malachi Douyon	54	G	6'3"	185	Senior	Santa Cruz, California	Walk-on; Graduated; Transferred to Dominican (CA)

=== Incoming transfers ===
Santa Clara incoming transfers
Name	Number	Pos.	Height	Weight	Year	Hometown	Previous school
David Castillo	0	G	6'1"	180	Junior	Bartlesville, Oklahoma	Kansas State
Sidi Gueye	35	C	6'11"	215	Sophomore	Guédiawaye, Senegal	Arizona
Fedor Žugić	77	G	6'6"	220	Senior	Podgorica, Montenegro	Creighton

=== Recruiting class ===
College recruiting
Name	Hometown	School	Height	Weight	Commit date
Eli Jolin; G	Rouyn-Noranda, QC	Fort Erie International Academy	6 ft 7 in (2.01 m)	195 lb (88 kg)	Nov 12, 2025
Eli Jolin; G	Recruit ratings: Rivals: (NR)				
Alex Ensor; C	Denver, CO	Compas Prep (AZ)	7 ft 1 in (2.16 m)	225 lb (102 kg)	Nov 12, 2025
Alex Ensor; C	Recruit ratings: No ratings found				
Brayde Kuykendall; PG	San Ramon, CA	California (San Ramon) High School	6 ft 5 in (1.96 m)	190 lb (86 kg)	Jun 9, 2025
Brayde Kuykendall; PG	Recruit ratings: No ratings found				
Overall recruit ranking: Rivals: 184 247Sports: NR ESPN: NR
Note: In many cases, Scout, Rivals, 247Sports, On3, and ESPN may conflict in their listings of height and weight.; In these cases, the average was taken. ESPN grades are on a 100-point scale.; Sources: "Santa Clara 2026 Basketball Commitments". Rivals.; "2026 Santa Clara Basketball Commits". Scout.; "ESPN". ESPN.; "Scout.com Team Recruiting Rankings". Scout.; "2026 Team Ranking". Rivals.

== Roster ==
2026–27 Santa Clara Broncos men's basketball team
Players
Coaches

Pos.	#	Name	Height	Weight	Year	Previous school	Hometown
G	0	David Castillo	6 ft 1 in (1.85 m)	180 lb (82 kg)	So	Kansas State	Bartlesville, Oklahoma
G	2	Sash Gavalyugov	6 ft 3 in (1.91 m)	185 lb (84 kg)	RS So	Villanova	Botevgrad, Bulgaria
C	3	Francis Chukwudebelu	6 ft 10 in (2.08 m)	245 lb (111 kg)	So	Argyle High School	McKinney, Texas
G	4	Bradley Longcor III	6 ft 4 in (1.93 m)	195 lb (88 kg)	So	Quincy High School	Quincy, Illinois
G	7	Eli John	6 ft 7 in (2.01 m)	195 lb (88 kg)	Fr	Fort Erie International Academy	Rouyn-Noranda, Quebec
C	8	Alex Ensor	7 ft 1 in (2.16 m)	225 lb (102 kg)	Fr	Compas Prep (AZ)	Denver, Colorado
F	8	Elijah Mahi	6 ft 7 in (2.01 m)	220 lb (100 kg)	GS	West Valley College	Toronto, Ontario
F	10	Nolan Badibanga	6 ft 8 in (2.03 m)	190 lb (86 kg)	So	Élan Sportif Chalon	Toulouse, France
G	12	KJ Cochran	6 ft 5 in (1.96 m)	190 lb (86 kg)	So	Perkiomen School	West Chester, Pennsylvania
G	13	Brayde Kuykendall	6 ft 5 in (1.96 m)	190 lb (86 kg)	Fr	California (San Ramon) High School	San Ramon, California
F	14	Chris Tadjo	6 ft 7 in (2.01 m)	250 lb (113 kg)	Jr	Iowa	Montreal, Quebec
G	15	Thierry Darlan	6 ft 8 in (2.03 m)	210 lb (95 kg)	Sr	Delaware Blue Coats	Bangui, Central African Republic
C	35	Sidi Gueye	6 ft 11 in (2.11 m)	215 lb (98 kg)	So	Arizona	Guédiawaye, Senegal
G	44	Jake Ensminger	6 ft 9 in (2.06 m)	215 lb (98 kg)	RS Sr	Ratiopharm Ulm	Ulm, Germany
G	77	Fedor Žugić	6 ft 6 in (1.98 m)	220 lb (100 kg)	Sr	Creighton	Podgorica, Montenegro

Head coach

- Herb Sendek (Carnegie Mellon)

Assistant coach(es)

- Jason Ludwig (UCLA)
- Ryan Madry (West Georgia)
- Will Burkett (Santa Clara)
- Jackson Gion (Sonoma State)
- Mitch Smith (California)

Legend

- (C) Team captain
- (S) Suspended
- (I) Ineligible
- (W) Walk-on
- Injured
- Current redshirt

Roster

== Schedule and results ==
Date time, TV	Rank^{#}	Opponent^{#}	Result	Record	High points	High rebounds	High assists	Site (attendance) city, state
Exhibition
October 17, 2026*; 7:00 p.m.		Stanford	W 83–78	–	18 – Kuykendall	11 – Ensminger	6 – Ensminger	Leavey Center (1,664); Santa Clara, CA
October 24, 2026*; 1:00 p.m.		at Utah State	L 79–101	–	14 – Tied	6 – Darlan	3 – Tied	Smith Spectrum (3,459); Logan, UT
Non-conference regular season
November 2, 2026*; 7:00 p.m., ESPN+		Towson	W 89–70	1–0	18 – Longcor III	7 – Tadjo	4 – Tied	Leavey Center (1,093); Santa Clara, CA
November 4, 2026*; 7:00 p.m., ESPN+		Milwaukee	W 95–72	2–0	15 – Ensminger	10 – Tadjo	8 – Gavalyugov	Leavey Center (1,040); Santa Clara, CA
November 7, 2026*; 7:00 p.m., ESPN+		Sacramento State	W 83–77	3–0	14 – Tadjo	7 – Gavalyugov	5 – Gavalyugov	Leavey Center (1,691); Santa Clara, CA
November 11, 2026*; 5:00 p.m., ESPN+		at North Texas	W 76–71	4–0	16 – Darlan	9 – Darlan	2 – Tied	UNT Coliseum (3,689); Denton, TX
November 14, 2026*; 7:00 p.m., ESPN+		New Mexico	W 90–85	5–0	26 – Mahi	9 – Tied	5 – Mahi	Leavey Center (2,211); Santa Clara, CA
November 19, 2026*; 7:30 p.m., ESPN2		VCU	L 77–83 ^{OT}	5–1	22 – Gavalyugov	9 – Tadjo	2 – Tied	Leavey Center (1,977); Santa Clara, CA
November 23, 2026*; 4:00 p.m., FloSports		vs. Illinois State; Acrisure Invitational						Acrisure Arena; Palm Desert, CA
November 24, 2026*; 4:00 p.m., CBSSN		vs. Nevada; Acrisure Invitational						Acrisure Arena; Palm Desert, CA
November 28, 2026*; 4:00 p.m., ESPN+		Utah Tech						Leavey Center; Santa Clara, CA
December 2, 2026*; 7:00 p.m., ESPN+		Fresno State						Leavey Center; Santa Clara, CA
December 5, 2026*; 5:00 p.m., MW+		at Grand Canyon						Global Credit Union Arena; Phoenix, AZ
December 12, 2026*; 4:00 p.m.		vs. Murray State; Jack Jones Classic						Lee's Family Forum; Henderson, NV
December 14, 2026*; 5:00 p.m.		vs. McNeese; Jack Jones Classic						Lee's Family Forum; Henderson, NV
December 21, 2026*; 2:00 p.m.		vs. Boise State; The Capistrano Invitational						The Pavilion at JSerra; San Juan Capistrano, CA
December 23, 2026*; 3:30 p.m., USA		vs. Oregon State; The Capistrano Invitational						The Pavilion at JSerra; San Juan Capistrano, CA
December 29, 2026*; 5:00 p.m., ESPN+		Dominican (CA)						Leavey Center; Santa Clara, CA
WCC regular season
January 2, 2027; ESPN+		at Pacific						Alex G. Spanos Center; Stockton, CA
January 7, 2027; 8:00 p.m., ESPN2		San Francisco						Leavey Center; Santa Clara, CA
January 13, 2027; ESPN+		at San Diego						Jenny Craig Pavilion; San Diego, CA
January 13, 2027; 3:00 p.m., CBSSN		at Loyola Marymount						Gersten Pavilion; Los Angeles, CA
January 20, 2027; 7:00 p.m., ESPN+		Pepperdine						Leavey Center; Santa Clara, CA
January 23, 2027; 4:00 p.m., ESPN+		Pacific						Leavey Center; Santa Clara, CA
January 27, 2027; ESPN+		at Portland						Chiles Center; Portland, OR
January 30, 2027; 7:00 p.m., ESPN2		at Saint Mary's						University Credit Union Pavilion; Moraga, CA
February 3, 2027; 7:00 p.m., ESPN+		Seattle						Leavey Center; Santa Clara, CA
February 6, 2027; 6:00 p.m., ESPN+		San Diego						Leavey Center; Santa Clara, CA
February 10, 2027; 7:00 p.m., ESPN+		Denver						Leavey Center; Santa Clara, CA
February 13, 2027; ESPN+		at Pepperdine						Firestone Fieldhouse; Malibu, CA
February 16, 2027; 8:00 p.m., ESPN+		at Seattle						Redhawk Center; Seattle, WA
February 20, 2027; 6:00 p.m., ESPN+		Loyola Marymount						Leavey Center; Santa Clara, CA
February 24, 2027; 8:00 p.m., ESPN2		at San Francisco						Sobrato Center; San Francisco, CA
February 27, 2027; 7:00 / 7:30 p.m., ESPN2		Saint Mary's						Leavey Center; Santa Clara, CA
*Non-conference game. ^{#}Rankings from AP Poll. (#) Tournament seedings in parentheses. All times are in Pacific Time.
