= 2026–27 Seattle Redhawks men's basketball team =

American college basketball season

2026–27 Seattle Redhawks men's basketball
- Conference: West Coast Conference
- Record: 3–2 (0–0 WCC)
- Head coach: Chris Victor (6th season)
- Associate head coach: Grant Leep (2nd, 4th overall season)
- Assistant coaches: D'Marques Tyson (6th season); Steven Shpreyrengin (4th season); Colin Rardin (4th season)
- Home arena: Redhawk Center (Capacity: 999); Climate Pledge Arena (Capacity: 18,300)

2026–27 West Coast Conference men's basketball standings
	Conf.				Overall
Team	W		L	PCT	W		L	PCT
Santa Clara	0	–	0	–	5	–	0	1.000
Pacific	0	–	0	–	4	–	1	.800
Saint Mary's	0	–	0	–	4	–	1	.800
San Diego	0	–	0	–	4	–	1	.800
San Francisco	0	–	0	–	4	–	1	.800
Portland	0	–	0	–	4	–	2	.667
Seattle	0	–	0	–	3	–	2	.600
Pepperdine	0	–	0	–	2	–	2	.500
Loyola Marymount	0	–	0	–	2	–	3	.400
Denver	0	–	0	–	1	–	3	.250
† 2027 WCC tournament winner As of November 19, 2026; Rankings from AP poll

The 2026–27 Seattle Redhawks men's basketball team will represent Seattle University during the 2026–27 NCAA Division I men's basketball season. The Redhawks will be led by sixth-year head coach Chris Victor and will play their home games on-campus at Redhawk Center and off-campus at Climate Pledge Arena in Seattle, Washington as a member of the West Coast Conference.

== Previous season ==
Seattle finished the 2025-26 season 21–14, 8–10 in the West Coast Conference to finish tied for fifth in the conference. As the 6-seed in the WCC Tournament the Redhawks defeated by 11-seed San Diego in the Second round before falling to 6-seed Pacific 58-61. Seattle was invited to participate in the NIT as the 4-seed in the Auburn Region. The Redhawks bested St. Thomas (MN) in the First round but were defeated by top-seeded host Auburn 85–91 to end their season.

== Offseason ==
=== Departures ===
Seattle Redhawks departures
Name	Number	Pos.	Height	Weight	Year	Hometown	Reason for departure
Brayden Maldonado	0	G	6'0"	171	Senior	Anchorage, AK	Out of eligibility
Miles Amos	2	G	6'2"	200	Junior	South San Francisco, CA	Departed program
Jojo Murphy	5	G	6'2"	180	Senior	Piedmont, CA	Out of eligibility
Houran Dan	6	C	6'10"	230	Sophomore	Baotou, China	Transferred to Hawaii
Stratos Papastavrou	9	F	6'7"	197	Freshman	Alimos, Greece	Departed program
John Cristofilis	11	G	6'3"	205	(redshirt) Senior	Seattle, WA	Out of eligibility
Brock Felder	33	F	6'8"	256	Junior	Parowan, UT	Transferred to Weber State
Austin Maurer	34	C	7'0"	230	Sophomore	Medford, OR	Transferred to Stanford

=== Incoming transfers ===
Seattle Redhawks incoming transfers
Name	Number	Pos.	Height	Weight	Year	Hometown	Previous School
Tyler Boston	0	G	6'0''	185	Junior	Severn, MD	Holy Cross
Mason Williams	2	G	6'5"	200	Senior	Seattle, WA	Iowa State
Tómas Thrastarson	11	F	6'7"	215	Junior	Þorlákshöfn, Iceland	Washington State
Ladji Coulibaly	12	C	6'10''	-	Sophomore	Kati, Mali	New Mexico JC
Kaden Hansen	24	G	6'2"	150	Graduate	Auburn, WA	Saint Martin's
Halvine Dzellat	65	C	6'10''	240	Senior	Blois, France	Cincinnati

=== 2026 recruiting class ===
College recruiting
Name	Hometown	School	Height	Weight	Commit date
Jaden Bailes; CG	San Juan Capistrano, CA	JSerra Catholic	6 ft 2 in (1.88 m)	185 lb (84 kg)	Oct 1, 2025
Jaden Bailes; CG	Recruit ratings: 247Sports: (NR)				
Amare Larane; SG	Palmdale, CA	Knight HS	6 ft 4 in (1.93 m)	N/A	May 8, 2026
Amare Larane; SG	Recruit ratings: (NR)				
Shaun Stinson; PG	South Kent, CT	South Kent School	6 ft 2 in (1.88 m)	N/A	Sep 21, 2026
Shaun Stinson; PG	Recruit ratings: (NR)				
Overall recruit ranking: Scout: – Rivals: –
Note: In many cases, Scout, Rivals, 247Sports, On3, and ESPN may conflict in their listings of height and weight.; In these cases, the average was taken. ESPN grades are on a 100-point scale.; Sources: "2026 Seattle U Basketball Recruiting Commits". Scout.; "Scout.com Team Recruiting Rankings". Scout.; "2026 Team Ranking". Rivals.

== Roster ==
2026–27 Seattle Redhawks men's basketball team
Players
Coaches

Pos.	#	Name	Height	Weight	Year	Previous school	Hometown
G	0	Tyler Boston	6 ft 0 in (1.83 m)	185 lb (84 kg)	Jr	Holy Cross	Severn, Maryland
G	1	Jaden Bailes	6 ft 2 in (1.88 m)	—	Fr	JSerra Catholic HS	San Diego, California
G	2	Mason Williams	6 ft 5 in (1.96 m)	200 lb (91 kg)	Sr	Iowa State	Seattle, Washington
F	5	Will Heimbrodt	6 ft 7 in (2.01 m)	220 lb (100 kg)	Sr	SoCal Academy	San Anselmo, California
G	7	Jeremiah Harshman	6 ft 1 in (1.85 m)	170 lb (77 kg)	So	Annie Wright HS	Tacoma, Washington
G	8	Shaun Stinson	6 ft 2 in (1.88 m)	—	Fr	South Kent School	West Covina, California
F	10	Ray Adams	6 ft 8 in (2.03 m)	202 lb (92 kg)	Jr	North Thurston HS	Olympia, Washington
F	11	Tómas Thrastarson	6 ft 7 in (2.01 m)	215 lb (98 kg)	Jr	Washington State	Þorlákshöfn, Iceland
C	12	Ladji Coulibaly	6 ft 10 in (2.08 m)	—	So	New Mexico JC	Kati, Mali
G	13	Amare Larane	6 ft 4 in (1.93 m)	—	Fr	Knight HS	Palmdale, California
G	14	JT White	6 ft 4 in (1.93 m)	190 lb (86 kg)	Sr	Elite Prep	Issaquah, Washington
G	17	Maleek Arington	6 ft 3 in (1.91 m)	215 lb (98 kg)	GS	Idaho State	Auburn, Washington
F	21	Junseok Yeo	6 ft 8 in (2.03 m)	218 lb (99 kg)	GS	Gonzaga	Seoul, South Korea
G	24	Kaden Hansen	6 ft 2 in (1.88 m)	150 lb (68 kg)	GS	Saint Martin's	Auburn, Washington
F	25	Yuto Kawashima	6 ft 9 in (2.06 m)	215 lb (98 kg)	Jr	BA Centre of Excellence	Gunma, Japan
C	65	Halvine Dzellat	6 ft 10 in (2.08 m)	240 lb (109 kg)	Sr	Cincinnati	Blois, France

Head coach

- Chris Victor (Concordia–Irvine)

Assistant coach(es)

- Grant Leep (Washington)
- D'Marques Tyson (Portland)
- Steven Shpreyregin (Washington State)
- Colin Rardin (Pacific)

Legend

- (C) Team captain
- (S) Suspended
- (I) Ineligible
- (W) Walk-on
- Injured
- Current redshirt

Roster

== Schedule and results ==
Date time, TV	Rank^{#}	Opponent^{#}	Result	Record	High points	High rebounds	High assists	Site (attendance) city, state
Exhibition
October 15, 2026*; 7:00 p.m., B1G+		at Oregon	W 71–65	–	19 – Williams	9 – Tied	4 – Tied	Matthew Knight Arena (4,208); Eugene, OR
Non-conference regular season
November 2, 2026*; 9:00 p.m., MW+		at Hawaii	L 73–74	0–1	20 – Tied	10 – Dzellat	6 – Boston	Stan Sheriff Center (4,256); Honolulu, HI
November 7, 2026*; 7:00 p.m., ESPN+		Portland State	W 79–60	1–1	18 – Tied	8 – Dzellat	3 – Heimbrodt	Redhawk Center (999); Seattle, WA
November 11, 2026*; 7:00 p.m., ESPN+		UTSA	L 59–86	1–2	18 – Heimbrodt	8 – Heimbrodt	4 – Heimbrodt	Redhawk Center (940); Seattle, WA
November 14, 2026*; 7:00 p.m., ESPN+		Idaho State	W 77–70	2–2	18 – Heimbrodt	6 – Heimbrodt	4 – Boston	Redhawk Center (696); Seattle, WA
November 17, 2026*; 7:00 p.m., ESPN+		at California Baptist	W 83–54	3–2	27 – Williams	12 – Heimbrodt	4 – Heimbrodt	Fowler Events Center (2,364); Riverside, CA
November 22, 2026*; 6:30 p.m., FloSports		vs. UC San Diego; Acrisure Series Pod 4 semifinals						Acrisure Arena; Thousand Palms, CA
November 23, 2026*; 5:00 p.m., FloSports		vs. Loyola Chicago/San Jose State; Acrisure Series Pod 4						Acrisure Arena; Thousand Palms, CA
November 28, 2026*; 2:00 p.m., ESPN+		UC Irvine						Redhawk Center; Seattle, WA
December 1, 2026*; 7:00 p.m., ESPN+		Norfolk State						Redhawk Center; Seattle, WA
December 5, 2026*; 6:00 p.m., MW+		San Jose State						Redhawk Center; Seattle, WA
December 12, 2026*; 5:00 p.m., ESPN+		Puget Sound						Redhawk Center; Seattle, WA
December 15, 2026*; 7:00 p.m., ESPN+		Austin Peay						Redhawk Center; Seattle, WA
December 19, 2026*; 4:30 p.m., TBD		Washington State; Seattle Holiday Classic						Climate Pledge Arena; Seattle, WA
December 22, 2026*; 7:00 p.m., ESPN+		UC Davis						Redhawk Center; Seattle, WA
December 29, 2026*; 4:00 p.m., B1G+		at Illinois						State Farm Center; Champaign, IL
WCC regular season
January 2, 2027; 7:00 p.m., ESPN+		Loyola Marymount						Redhawk Center; Seattle, WA
January 6, 2027; 7:00 p.m., ESPN+		Pepperdine						Redhawk Center; Seattle, WA
January 9, 2027; TBD, ESPN+		at Denver						Hamilton Gymnasium; Denver, CO
January 13, 2027; 7:00 p.m., ESPN+		San Francisco						Redhawk Center; Seattle, WA
January 16, 2027; TBD, ESPN+		at Pacific						Alex G. Spanos Center; Stockton, CA
January 20, 2027; 7:00 p.m., ESPN+		San Diego						Redhawk Center; Seattle, WA
January 23, 2027; 7:00 p.m., ESPN+		Portland						Redhawk Center; Seattle, WA
January 27, 2027; TBD, ESPN+		at Loyola Marymount						Gersten Pavilion; Los Angeles, CA
February 3, 2027; 7:00 p.m., ESPN+		at Santa Clara						Leavey Center; Santa Clara, CA
February 6, 2027; 8:30 p.m., ESPN2		Saint Mary's						Climate Pledge Arena; Seattle, WA
February 10, 2027; TBD, ESPN+		at Pepperdine						The Mountain at Mullin Park; Malibu, CA
February 13, 2027; TBD, ESPN+		at San Diego						Jenny Craig Pavilion; San Diego, CA
February 16, 2027; 8:00 p.m., ESPN2		Santa Clara						Climate Pledge Arena; Seattle, WA
February 20, 2027; 7:00 p.m., ESPN+		Denver						Redhawk Center; Seattle, WA
February 24, 2027; 7:00 p.m., ESPN+		at Saint Mary's						University Credit Union Pavilion; Moraga, CA
February 27, 2027; 5:00 p.m., ESPN+		at San Francisco						Sobrato Center; San Francisco, CA
WCC tournament
March 5, 2027; TBD, TBD		vs. TBD						Orleans Arena; Paradise, NV
*Non-conference game. ^{#}Rankings from AP Poll. (#) Tournament seedings in parentheses. All times are in Pacific Time.
