= 2026–27 West Coast Conference men's basketball season =

- League: NCAA Division I
- Sport: Men's basketball
- Teams: 10
- TV partner(s): CBSSN, ESPN, ESPN+

Regular season

Tournament
- Venue: Orleans Arena, Paradise, Nevada

Basketball seasons
- ← 2025–26 2027–28 →

2026–27 West Coast Conference men's basketball standings
	Conf.				Overall
Team	W		L	PCT	W		L	PCT
Santa Clara	0	–	0	–	5	–	0	1.000
Pacific	0	–	0	–	3	–	1	.750
Saint Mary's	0	–	0	–	3	–	1	.750
San Diego	0	–	0	–	3	–	1	.750
San Francisco	0	–	0	–	3	–	1	.750
Portland	0	–	0	–	3	–	2	.600
Pepperdine	0	–	0	–	2	–	2	.500
Seattle	0	–	0	–	2	–	2	.500
Loyola Marymount	0	–	0	–	2	–	3	.400
Denver	0	–	0	–	0	–	3	.000
† 2027 WCC tournament winner As of November 17, 2026; Rankings from AP poll

The 2026–27 West Coast Conference men's basketball season is an upcoming season for West Coast Conference basketball teams that will begin with practices and exhibition games in October 2026, followed by the start of the 2026–27 NCAA Division I men's basketball season in November 2026. Conference play will begin in December 2026 and end in March 2027.

This year marks the first season since 1979 without Gonzaga, who departed for the Pac-12 on July 1. Additionally, associate members Oregon State and Washington State departed following the Pac-12's resumption.

The season marks the first season for Denver, who joined the conference from The Summit League on July 1. They became the first member based in the Rocky Mountain Region to join the conference since the departure of BYU in 2023.

== Head coaches ==
=== Coaching changes ===
==== Pepperdine ====
On March 9, 2026, the university fired head coach Ed Schilling after two seasons. He finished with a 22–45 record. On March 30, Virginia assistant and former Longwood head coach Griff Aldrich was named the next head coach.

==== Saint Mary's ====
After 25 seasons, long-time head coach Randy Bennett departed to become the head coach for the Arizona State Sun Devils. He finished with a 589–228 record, seven WCC regular season titles and four WCC tournament titles. On March 23, 2026, longtime assistant and former Gael Mickey McConnell was promoted to head coach.

==== San Diego ====
On February 18, 2026, with three games left in the 2025–26 season, head coach Steve Lavin was fired but allowed to stay on until the season's end. He finished with a 47–83 record. On March 10, Iowa State assistant JR Blount was announced the next head coach.

=== Coaches ===
Team	Head coach	Previous job	Years at school	Overall record	WCC record	WCC Tournament record	NCAA Tournaments	Sweet Sixteens
Denver	Tim Bergstraser	Minnesota State–Moorhead	2	15–17 (.469)	0–0 (–)	0–0 (–)	0	0
Loyola Marymount	Stan Johnson	Marquette (Asst.)	7	87–90 (.492)	38–57 (.400)	3–6 (.333)	0	0
Pacific	Dave Smart	Texas Tech (Asst.)	3	27–39 (.409)	12–24 (.333)	1–2 (.333)	0	0
Pepperdine	Griff Aldrich	Virginia (Asst.)	1	0–0 (–)	0–0 (–)	0–0 (–)	0	0
Portland	Shantay Legans	Eastern Washington	6	72–94 (.434)	30–52 (.366)	5–5 (.500)	0	0
Saint Mary's	Mickey McConnell	Saint Mary's (Assoc.)	1	0–0 (–)	0–0 (–)	0–0 (–)	0	0
San Diego	JR Blount	Iowa State (Asst.)	1	0–0 (–)	0–0 (–)	0–0 (–)	0	0
San Francisco	Chris Gerlufsen	San Francisco (Assoc.)	5	85–51 (.625)	39–29 (.574)	5–4 (.556)	0	0
Santa Clara	Herb Sendek	Arizona State	10	187–129 (.592)	94–66 (.588)	8–10 (.444)	1	0
Seattle	Chris Victor	Seattle (Asst.)	5	101–67 (.601)	8–10 (.444)	1–1 (.500)	0	0

Notes:

- All records, appearances, titles, etc. are from time with current school only.
- Year at school includes 2026–27 season.
- Overall and WCC records are from time at current school only and are through the beginning of the season.
- Bergstraser's Summit League and Victor's WAC records are not included since the team began play in the WCC.

== Preseason ==
=== Preseason poll ===
2026-27 WCC Preseason Men's Basketball Coaches Poll
Rank	Team (First Place Votes)	Points
1.	Santa Clara (9)	81
2.	Saint Mary's (1)	70
3.	San Francisco	58
4.	Seattle	54
5.	Pacific	53
6.	Loyola Marymount	46
7.	Pepperdine	30
8.	San Diego	26
9.	Portland	36
10.	Denver	10

=== All-WCC Preseason Men's Basketball team ===
Honor	Recipient
Preseason All-WCC Team	Joshua Dent, Saint Mary's
Preseason All-WCC Team	Jake Ensminger, Santa Clara
Preseason All-WCC Team	Sash Gavalyugov, Gonzaga
Preseason All-WCC Team	Will Heimbrodt, Seattle
Preseason All-WCC Team	Carson Johnson, Denver
Preseason All-WCC Team	Petar Majstorovic, Pepperdine
Preseason All-WCC Team	Will McClendon, Pepperdine
Preseason All-WCC Team	Ndewedo Newbury, San Francisco
Preseason All-WCC Team	All Wright, Loyola Marymount
Preseason All-WCC Team	Junseok Yeo, Seattle

== Regular season ==
=== Early season tournaments ===
The following table summarizes the multiple-team events (MTE) or early season tournaments in which teams from the West Coast Conference will participate.

Team	Tournament	Finish
Denver	Fountain City Happy Hour Classic	
Loyola Marymount	Acrisure Series (Pod 5)	
Pacific	Resorts World Classic	
Pepperdine	Gratitude Thanksgiving Classic	
Portland	Rainbow Classic	2nd
Portland	Acrisure Series (Pod 5)	
Saint Mary's	Rady Children's Invitational	
San Diego	Acrisure Series (Pod 5)	
San Francisco	Acrisure Series (Pod 3)	
San Francisco	Texas Legends College Classic	
Santa Clara	Acrisure Series (Pod 3)	
Santa Clara	Jack Jones Classic	
Santa Clara	The Capistrano Invitational	
Seattle	Acrisure Series (Pod 4)	

=== WCC Player/Freshman of the Week ===
Throughout the year, the West Coast Conference names a player of the week and a freshman of the week as follows:

Week	Date	Player of the Week	School	Freshman of the Week	School
1	November 9, 2026	James O'Donnell	Portland	Bradley Longcor III	Santa Clara
2	November 16, 2026	Elijah Mahi	Santa Clara	Darius Bivins	Saint Mary's
