= 2026–27 Stanford Cardinal men's basketball team =

American college basketball season

2026–27 Stanford Cardinal men's basketball
- Conference: Atlantic Coast Conference
- Record: 3–1 (0–0 ACC)
- Head coach: Kyle Smith (3rd season)
- Assistant coaches: Jim Shaw; Wayne Hunter; Jeremy Harden; Matt Elkin
- Home arena: Maples Pavilion

2026–27 ACC men's basketball standings
	Conf.				Overall
Team	W		L	PCT	W		L	PCT
No. 4 Virginia	0	–	0	–	5	–	0	1.000
Boston College	0	–	0	–	4	–	0	1.000
Georgia Tech	0	–	0	–	4	–	0	1.000
NC State	0	–	0	–	4	–	0	1.000
Notre Dame	0	–	0	–	4	–	0	1.000
Pittsburgh	0	–	0	–	4	–	0	1.000
SMU	0	–	0	–	4	–	0	1.000
Virginia Tech	0	–	0	–	4	–	0	1.000
Clemson	0	–	0	–	3	–	1	.750
No. 5 Duke	0	–	0	–	3	–	1	.750
Florida State	0	–	0	–	3	–	1	.750
No. 17 Miami (FL)	0	–	0	–	3	–	1	.750
North Carolina	0	–	0	–	3	–	1	.750
Stanford	0	–	0	–	3	–	1	.750
Wake Forest	0	–	0	–	3	–	1	.750
No. 23 Louisville	0	–	0	–	2	–	1	.667
California	0	–	0	–	3	–	2	.600
Syracuse	0	–	0	–	2	–	2	.500
† 2027 ACC tournament winner As of November 17, 2026; Rankings from AP poll

The 2026–27 Stanford Cardinal men's basketball team represents Stanford University during the 2026–27 NCAA Division I men's basketball season. The Cardinals, are led by third-year head coach Kyle Smith, play their home games at Maples Pavilion in their third season as members of the Atlantic Coast Conference.

== Previous season ==
The Cardinal finished 20–13 and 9–9 in ACC play to finish in a tie for ninth place. As the tenth seed in the 2026 ACC tournament, they were defeated by Pittsburgh 63–64 in the First Round. They received an at-large bid to the College Basketball Crown. They lost to eventual tournament champions West Virginia 77–82 in the Quarterfinals to end their season.

== Offseason ==
=== Departures ===
Stanford Departures
Name	Number	Pos.	Height	Weight	Year	Hometown	Reason for Departure
Ebuka Okorie	1	G	6'2"	185	Freshman	Nashua, NH	Declared for 2026 NBA draft; Selected 17th overall by Oklahoma City Thunder
AJ Rohosy	4	F	6'9"	230	Graduate Student	San Anselmo, CA	Graduated
Benny Gealer	5	G	6'1"	185	Senior	Palos Verdes Estates, CA	Graduated
Chisom Okpara	10	F	6'8"	240	Senior	Bronxville, NY	Graduated
Ryan Agarwal	11	G	6'6"	205	RS-Junior	Coppell, TX	Transferred to Loyola–Chicago
Oskar Giltay	15	F/C	6'10"	235	Freshman	Bilzen, Belgium	Transferred to UConn
Cameron Grant	20	F	6'7"	220	RS-Sophomore	Lakewood, OH	Transferred to UNC Greensboro
Jaylen Thompson	24	F	6'7"	210	RS-Sophomore	Oakland, CA	Transferred to Pacific
Jeremy Dent–Smith	25	G	6'1"	200	Graduate Student	Hawthorne, CA	Graduated

=== Incoming transfers ===
Stanford Additions
Name	Number	Pos.	Height	Weight	Year	Hometown	Notes
Christian Bliss	24	G	6'4"	190	RS-Sophomore	Queens, NY	Delaware
Austin Maurer	34	C	7'0"	230	Junior	Medford, OR	Seattle
Nick Townsend	42	PF	6'7"	240	Graduate	Chappaqua, NY	Yale

=== 2026 recruiting class ===
College recruiting
Name	Hometown	School	Height	Weight	Commit date
Aziz Olajuwon; SG	Sugar Land, TX	IMG Academy	6 ft 6 in (1.98 m)	205 lb (93 kg)	Sep 20, 2025
Aziz Olajuwon; SG	Recruit ratings: Rivals: 247Sports: On3: ESPN: (84)				
Isaiah "Slim" Rogers; PG	Corona, CA	Centennial High School	6 ft 2 in (1.88 m)	170 lb (77 kg)	Jul 31, 2025
Isaiah "Slim" Rogers; PG	Recruit ratings: Rivals: 247Sports: On3: ESPN: (82)				
Elias Obenyah; SG	Ukiah, CA	Salesian College Preparatory	6 ft 5 in (1.96 m)	180 lb (82 kg)	Sep 22, 2025
Elias Obenyah; SG	Recruit ratings: Rivals: 247Sports: On3: ESPN: (80)				
Drew Anderson; C	Ladera Ranch, CA	Santa Margarita Catholic High School	6 ft 9 in (2.06 m)	215 lb (98 kg)	Mar 23, 2026
Drew Anderson; C	Recruit ratings: Rivals: 247Sports: On3: ESPN: (80)				
Julius Price; G	Stockholm, Sweden	St. Joseph High School	6 ft 2 in (1.88 m)	170 lb (77 kg)	Nov 13, 2025
Julius Price; G	Recruit ratings: Rivals: 247Sports: On3: ESPN: (82)				
Overall recruit ranking:
Note: In many cases, Scout, Rivals, 247Sports, On3, and ESPN may conflict in their listings of height and weight.; In these cases, the average was taken. ESPN grades are on a 100-point scale.; Sources: "Stanford 2026 Basketball Commitments". Rivals.; "2026 Team Ranking". Rivals.

== Roster ==
2026–27 Stanford Cardinal men's basketball team
Players
Coaches

Pos.	#	Name	Height	Weight	Year	Previous school	Hometown
G	0	Anthony Batson Jr.	6 ft 3 in (1.91 m)	195 lb (88 kg)	RS So	Notre Dame Prep	Scottsdale, AZ
F	2	Donavin Young	6 ft 8 in (2.03 m)	220 lb (100 kg)	Jr	Link Academy	Pasco, WA
F/C	3	Tallis Toure	6 ft 11 in (2.11 m)	240 lb (109 kg)	Jr	West Park	Roseville, CA
G/F	4	Aziz Olajuwon	6 ft 7 in (2.01 m)	220 lb (100 kg)	Fr	IMG Academy	Houston, TX
G	5	Julius Price	6 ft 2 in (1.88 m)	200 lb (91 kg)	Fr	St. Joseph High School	Stockholm, Sweden
G	8	Elias Obenyah	6 ft 5 in (1.96 m)	205 lb (93 kg)	Fr	Salesian College Preparatory	Ukiah, CA
F	9	Drew Anderson	6 ft 10 in (2.08 m)	220 lb (100 kg)	Fr	Santa Margarita Catholic High School	Ladera Ranch, CA
G	11	Myles Jones	6 ft 3 in (1.91 m)	175 lb (79 kg)	RS Fr	Modesto Christian	Sacramento, CA
F	12	Kristers Skrinda	6 ft 10 in (2.08 m)	230 lb (104 kg)	RS Fr	Riga State Gymnasium No. 2	Riga, Latvia
G	13	Ethan Kitch	6 ft 2 in (1.88 m)	185 lb (84 kg)	Jr	Gunn	Palo Alto, CA
G	21	Isaiah Rogers	6 ft 3 in (1.91 m)	200 lb (91 kg)	Fr	Centennial High School	Corona, CA
G	24	Christian Bliss	6 ft 4 in (1.93 m)	190 lb (86 kg)	RS So	George School; Delaware	Queens, NY
F	33	Evan Stinson	6 ft 7 in (2.01 m)	205 lb (93 kg)	Jr	Cheney	Cheney, WA
C	34	Austin Maurer	7 ft 0 in (2.13 m)	230 lb (104 kg)	Jr	Cascade Christian High School; Seattle	Medford, OR
PF	42	Nick Townsend	6 ft 7 in (2.01 m)	240 lb (109 kg)		Hotchkiss School; Yale	Chappaqua, NY
F/C	52	Aidan Cammann	6 ft 10 in (2.08 m)	230 lb (104 kg)	RS Jr	Brewster Academy	Andover, MA

Head coach

- Kyle Smith (Hamilton)

Assistant coach(es)

- Eric Reveno (Stanford)
- Jim Shaw (Western Oregon)
- Wayne Hunter (Saint Mary's)
- Jeremy Harden (Arizona)
- Matt Elkin (Wisconsin)

Legend

- (C) Team captain
- (S) Suspended
- (I) Ineligible
- (W) Walk-on
- Injured
- Current redshirt

Roster

== Schedule and results ==
Date time, TV	Rank^{#}	Opponent^{#}	Result	Record	High points	High rebounds	High assists	Site (attendance) city, state
Exhibition
October 17, 2026*; 7:00 p.m.		at Santa Clara	L 78–83	–	26 – Price	9 – Maurer	3 – Tied	Leavey Center (1,664); Santa Clara, CA
October 25, 2026*; 1:30 p.m., B1G+		at Oregon	L 57–85	–	16 – Olajuwon	9 – Olajuwon	5 – Townsend	Matthew Knight Arena (4,246); Eugene, OR
Non-conference regular season
November 2, 2026*; 7:00 p.m., ACCNX		Eastern Washington	W 74–65	1–0	17 – Price	6 – Townsend	5 – Townsend	Maples Pavilion (2,103); Stanford, CA
November 6, 2026*; 7:00 p.m., ACCNX		Oakland	W 81–63	2–0	25 – Townsend	8 – Tied	4 – Tied	Maples Pavilion (2,706); Stanford, CA
November 9, 2026*; 7:00 p.m., ACCNX		Rice	W 91–73	3–0	31 – Townsend	11 – Maurer	6 – Townsend	Maples Pavilion (1,763); Stanford, CA
November 13, 2026*; 6:00 p.m., CBSSN		at UNLV	L 68–75	3–1	17 – Miles	6 – Jones	5 – Mack	Thomas & Mack Center (5,776); Paradise, NV
November 17, 2026*; 7:00 p.m., ACCNX		UC Irvine						Maples Pavilion; Stanford, CA
November 19, 2026*; 7:00 p.m., ACCNX		Sacramento State						Maples Pavilion; Stanford, CA
November 24, 2026*; 9:00 p.m., CBSSN		vs. Colorado; Acrisure Series Pod 2 semifinals						Acrisure Arena; Thousand Palms, CA
November 25, 2026*; TBA, CBSSN		vs. TBA; Acrisure Series Pod 2						Acrisure Arena; Thousand Palms, CA
November 29, 2026*; 1:00 p.m., ACCNX		Portland						Maples Pavilion; Stanford, CA
December 2, 2026*; 6:15 p.m., ESPNU		at Texas A&M; ACC–SEC Challenge						Reed Arena; College Station, TX
December 6, 2026*; 1:00 p.m., ACCNX		Pacific						Maples Pavilion; Stanford, CA
December 14, 2026*; 7:00 p.m., ACCNX		Northern Colorado						Maples Pavilion; Stanford, CA
December 18, 2026*; 7:00 p.m., ACCNX		San Jose State						Maples Pavilion; Stanford, CA
December 22, 2026*; 5:00 p.m., ACCNX		St. Thomas						Maples Pavilion; Stanford, CA
ACC regular season
December 30, 2026; 11:00 a.m., ACCN		at Notre Dame						Purcell Pavilion; South Bend, IN
January 2, 2027; 3:00 p.m., ACCN		at Louisville						KFC Yum! Center; Louisville, KY
January 6, 2027; 6:00 p.m., ACCN		Virginia						Maples Pavilion; Stanford, CA
January 9, 2027; 2:30 p.m., ACCN		Florida State						Maples Pavilion; Stanford, CA
January 13, 2027; 6:00 p.m., ACCN		at Duke						Cameron Indoor Stadium; Durham, NC
January 16, 2027; 11:15 a.m., The CW		at North Carolina						Dean Smith Center; Chapel Hill, NC
January 23, 2027; 6:00 p.m., The CW		at California						Haas Pavilion; Berkeley, CA
January 27, 2027; 8:00 p.m., ESPN2 or ESPNU		Syracuse						Maples Pavilion; Stanford, CA
January 30, 2027; 5:00 p.m., ACCN		NC State						Maples Pavilion; Stanford, CA
February 3, 2027; 4:00 p.m., ACCN		at Georgia Tech						McCamish Pavilion; Atlanta, GA
February 6, 2027; 5:00 p.m., ACCN		at SMU						Moody Coliseum; Dallas, TX
February 10, 2027; 6:00 p.m., ESPN2 or ESPNU		Miami						Maples Pavilion; Stanford, CA
February 13, 2027; 1:30 p.m., ACCN		Virginia Tech						Maples Pavilion; Stanford, CA
February 17, 2027; 6:00 p.m., ESPN2 or ESPNU		at Syracuse						JMA Wireless Dome; Syracuse, NY
February 20, 2027; 9:00 a.m., ESPN2		at Clemson						Littlejohn Coliseum; Clemson, SC
February 24, 2027; 8:00 p.m., ESPNU		Wake Forest						Maples Pavilion; Stanford, CA
February 27, 2027; 5:00/5:30 p.m., ESPN2		Boston College						Maples Pavilion; Stanford, CA
March 6, 2027; 1:00 p.m., ACCN		California						Maples Pavilion; Stanford, CA
*Non-conference game. ^{#}Rankings from AP Poll. (#) Tournament seedings in parentheses. All times are in Pacific Time.
