= 2026–27 Loyola Marymount Lions men's basketball team =

American college basketball season

2026–27 Loyola Marymount Lions men's basketball
- Conference: West Coast Conference
- Record: 2–3 (0–0 WCC)
- Head coach: Stan Johnson (7th season)
- Assistant coaches: Lorenzo Romar; Ricky Muench; Louis Wilson; Mark Phelps; Damari Milstead Josh Mandell
- Home arena: Gersten Pavilion

2026–27 West Coast Conference men's basketball standings
	Conf.				Overall
Team	W		L	PCT	W		L	PCT
Santa Clara	0	–	0	–	5	–	0	1.000
Saint Mary's	0	–	0	–	4	–	1	.800
Pacific	0	–	0	–	3	–	1	.750
San Diego	0	–	0	–	3	–	1	.750
San Francisco	0	–	0	–	3	–	1	.750
Portland	0	–	0	–	3	–	2	.600
Pepperdine	0	–	0	–	2	–	2	.500
Seattle	0	–	0	–	2	–	2	.500
Loyola Marymount	0	–	0	–	2	–	3	.400
Denver	0	–	0	–	1	–	3	.250
† 2027 WCC tournament winner As of November 17, 2026; Rankings from AP poll

The 2026–27 Loyola Marymount Lions men's basketball team represents Loyola Marymount University during the 2026–27 NCAA Division I men's basketball season. The Lions, led by seventh-year head coach Stan Johnson, play their home games at Gersten Pavilion in Los Angeles, California as members of the West Coast Conference.

== Previous season ==
The Lions finished the 2025–26 season 15–17, 6–12 in WCC play, to finish in a tie for ninth place. As the #10 seed in the WCC tournament, they were defeated by #11 seed San Diego in the first round.

== Preseason ==
On October 15, 2026, the West Coast Conference released their preseason poll. Loyola Marymount was picked to finish sixth in the conference.

=== Preseason rankings ===
WCC Preseason Poll
Place	Team	Votes
1	Santa Clara	81 (9)
2	Saint Mary's	70 (1)
3	San Francisco	58
4	Seattle	54
5	Pacific	53
6	Loyola Marymount	46
7	Pepperdine	30
8	San Diego	26
9	Portland	22
10	Denver	10
(#) first-place votes

=== Preseason All-WCC Team ===
Preseason All-WCC Team
Player	Year	Position
All Wright	Junior	Guard

== Roster ==
2026–27 Loyola Marymount Lions men's basketball team
Players
Coaches

Pos.	#	Name	Height	Weight	Year	Previous school	Hometown
G	0	Mazi Mosley	6 ft 5 in (1.96 m)	176 lb (80 kg)	So	LSU	Los Angeles, California
F	1	JJ Harris	6 ft 4 in (1.93 m)	195 lb (88 kg)	Fr	Windward School	Los Angeles, California
G	3	All Wright	6 ft 3 in (1.91 m)	190 lb (86 kg)	Jr	Xavier	Durango, Mexico
G	4	AJ Thomas	6 ft 3 in (1.91 m)	195 lb (88 kg)	So	Eduprize High School	Lancaster, California
G	7	Jasai Miles	6 ft 6 in (1.98 m)	212 lb (96 kg)	Sr	Indiana	Miami, Florida
F	8	Donovan Miller	6 ft 7 in (2.01 m)	194 lb (88 kg)	Fr	Central Catholic High School	Portland, Oregon
G	11	Zamir Paschal	6 ft 1 in (1.85 m)	171 lb (78 kg)	Fr	Central Catholic High School	Portland, Oregon
F	14	Jevon Porter (5th)	6 ft 11 in (2.11 m)	230 lb (104 kg)	Sr	Missouri	Columbia, Missouri
F	16	Aaron McBride	6 ft 6 in (1.98 m)	235 lb (107 kg)	Sr	Centennial High School	Corona, California
F	22	Christian Humphrey-Rembert	6 ft 9 in (2.06 m)	208 lb (94 kg)	So	Lafayette	Grand Rapids, Michigan
G	24	Zion Sensley	6 ft 8 in (2.03 m)	211 lb (96 kg)	Jr	UC Santa Barbara	San Carlos, California
F	33	Donovan Rivers	6 ft 9 in (2.06 m)	240 lb (109 kg)	Jr	Jacksonville	Columbia, South Carolina
F	34	Abdoul Bare	6 ft 9 in (2.06 m)	228 lb (103 kg)	Fr	St. Joseph High School	Santa Maria, California
G	40	Cooper Smith	6 ft 2 in (1.88 m)	185 lb (84 kg)	So	Greendale High School	Milwaukee, Wisconsin
F	42	George Tupy	6 ft 6 in (1.98 m)	220 lb (100 kg)	Sr	St. Francis High School	Sierra Madre, California
F	97	Andy Sigiscar	6 ft 9 in (2.06 m)	235 lb (107 kg)	RS So	Tarleton State	Orléans, France

Head coach

- Stan Johnson (Bemidji State)

Assistant coach(es)

- Lorenzo Romar (Washington)
- Ricky Muench (Marquette)
- Louis Wilson (William Jewell)
- Mark Phelps (Old Dominion)
- Damari Milstead (Cal State Fullerton)
- Josh Mandell (Washington)

Legend

- (C) Team captain
- (S) Suspended
- (I) Ineligible
- (W) Walk-on
- (5th) Fifth-year senior
- Injured
- Current redshirt

Roster
Last update: November 15, 2026

== Schedule and results ==
Date time, TV	Rank^{#}	Opponent^{#}	Result	Record	High points	High rebounds	High assists	Site (attendance) city, state
Exhibition
October 16, 2026*; 6:00 pm, ESPN+		California	L 59–60	–	14 – Wright	10 – Porter	6 – Mosley	Gersten Pavilion (1,502); Los Angeles, CA
October 25, 2026*; 2:00 pm		UC Santa Barbara	L 67–72	–	13 – Tied	10 – Porter	3 – Tied	Gersten Pavilion (1,314); Los Angeles, CA
Non-conference regular season
November 4, 2026*; 7:00 pm, ESPN+		Queens	L 95–96	0–1	22 – Tied	10 – Sigiscar	7 – Mosley	Gersten Pavilion (748); Los Angeles, CA
November 6, 2026*; 7:00 pm, ESPN+		Lincoln	W 102–50	1–1	20 – Sensley	13 – Sensley	5 – Miles	Gersten Pavilion; Los Angeles, CA
November 10, 2026*; 4:00 pm, ESPN+		at Troy	L 69–74 ^{OT}	1–2	17 – Miles	14 – Sensley	7 – Wright	Trojan Arena (2,614); Troy, AL
November 12, 2026*; 5:00 pm, YouTube		vs. South Alabama; Coastal Classic	L 72–79	1–3	15 – Sensley	9 – Sensley	7 – Miles	Pensacola Bay Center (442); Pensacola, FL
November 15, 2026*; 1:00 pm, ESPN+		Chicago State	W 86–49	2–3	19 – Porter	11 – Porter	6 – Mosley	Gersten Pavilion (654); Los Angeles, CA
November 21, 2026*; 4:00 pm, FloCollege		vs. California Baptist; Acrisure Series Pod 5						Acrisure Arena; Thousand Palms, CA
November 22, 2026*; 1:30 pm, FloCollege		vs. UC Irvine; Acrisure Series Pod 5						Acrisure Arena; Thousand Palms, CA
November 25, 2026*; 6:00 pm, ESPN+		Eastern Washington						Gersten Pavilion; Los Angeles, CA
November 28, 2026*; 7:00 pm, ESPN+		at UC San Diego						LionTree Arena; La Jolla, CA
December 4, 2026*; 7:00 pm, ESPN+		Hawaiʻi						Gersten Pavilion; Los Angeles, CA
December 7, 2026*; 4:30 pm, ESPN+		Florida Gulf Coast						Gersten Pavilion; Los Angeles, CA
December 9, 2026*; 7:00 pm, MW+		at Nevada						Lawlor Events Center; Reno, NV
December 13, 2026*; 4:00 pm		vs. McNeese; Jack Jones Classic						Lee's Family Forum; Henderson, NV
December 19, 2026*; 6:00 pm, ESPN+		Cal State Bakersfield						Gersten Pavilion; Los Angeles, CA
December 22, 2026*; 3:00 pm, ESPN+		Wyoming						Gersten Pavilion; Los Angeles, CA
December 29, 2026*; 7:00 pm, ESPN+		Pepperdine						Gersten Pavilion; Los Angeles, CA
WCC regular season
January 2, 2027; 7:00 pm, ESPN+		at Seattle						Redhawk Center; Seattle, WA
January 6, 2027; 7:00 pm, ESPN+		San Diego						Gersten Pavilion; Los Angeles, CA
January 9, 2027; 6:00 pm, ESPN+		at Pepperdine						The Mountain at Mullin Park; Malibu, CA
January 12, 2027; 8:00 pm, ESPNU		Pacific						Gersten Pavilion; Los Angeles, CA
January 16, 2027; 3:00 pm, CBSSN		Santa Clara						Gersten Pavilion; Los Angeles, CA
January 19, 2027; 7:00 pm, CBSSN		at San Francisco						Sobrato Center; San Francisco, CA
January 23, 2027; 7:00 pm, ESPN+		at Saint Mary's						University Credit Union Pavilion; Moraga, CA
January 27, 2027; 7:00 pm, ESPN+		Seattle						Gersten Pavilion; Los Angeles, CA
January 30, 2027; 6:00 pm, ESPN+		Denver						Gersten Pavilion; Los Angeles, CA
February 6, 2027; 5:00 pm, ESPN+		at Portland						Chiles Center; Portland, OR
February 10, 2027; 6:30 pm, ESPN+		at San Diego						Jenny Craig Pavilion; San Diego, CA
February 13, 2027; 7:30 pm, CBSSN		Saint Mary's						Gersten Pavilion; Los Angeles, CA
February 17, 2027; 7:00 pm, ESPN+		San Francisco						Gersten Pavilion; Los Angeles, CA
February 20, 2027; 5:00 pm, ESPN+		at Santa Clara						Leavey Center; Santa Clara, CA
February 24, 2027; 6:00 pm, ESPN+		at Denver						Hamilton Gymnasium; Denver, CO
February 27, 2027; 6:00 pm, ESPN+		Portland						Gersten Pavilion; Los Angeles, CA
WCC tournament
March 5–9, 2027		vs.						Orleans Arena; Paradise, NV
*Non-conference game. ^{#}Rankings from AP poll. (#) Tournament seedings in parentheses. All times are in Pacific.
