= 2026–27 San Francisco Dons men's basketball team =

American college basketball season

2026–27 San Francisco Dons men's basketball
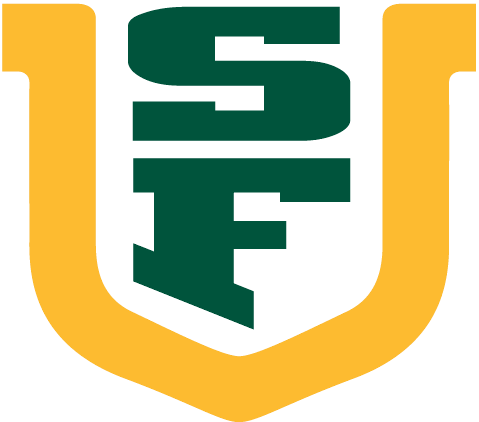
- Conference: West Coast Conference
- Record: 4–1 (0–0 WCC)
- Head coach: Chris Gerlufsen (5th season)
- Assistant coaches: Jay Duncan; Kyle Bankhead; Vinnie McGhee; Frankie Ferrari; Ryan Boatright
- Home arena: Sobrato Center (Capacity: 3,005); Chase Center (Capacity: 18,064)

2026–27 West Coast Conference men's basketball standings
	Conf.				Overall
Team	W		L	PCT	W		L	PCT
Santa Clara	0	–	0	–	5	–	1	.833
Pacific	0	–	0	–	4	–	1	.800
Saint Mary's	0	–	0	–	4	–	1	.800
San Diego	0	–	0	–	4	–	1	.800
San Francisco	0	–	0	–	4	–	1	.800
Portland	0	–	0	–	4	–	2	.667
Seattle	0	–	0	–	3	–	2	.600
Loyola Marymount	0	–	0	–	2	–	3	.400
Pepperdine	0	–	0	–	2	–	3	.400
Denver	0	–	0	–	1	–	3	.250
† 2027 WCC tournament winner As of November 20, 2026; Rankings from AP poll

The 2026–27 San Francisco Dons men's basketball team will represent the University of San Francisco during the 2026–27 NCAA Division I men's basketball season. The Dons will be led by fifth-year head coach Chris Gerlufsen and will play their home games at the Sobrato Center and occasional games at the Chase Center, both in San Francisco, California, as members of the West Coast Conference (WCC).

== Previous season ==
After four straight seasons of 20+ wins, the Dons finished the 2025–26 season a disappointing 17–16, 8–10 in WCC play, to finish in a three-way tie for fifth place. As the No. 5 seed in the WCC tournament, they defeated Portland in the third round, before losing to Oregon State in the quarterfinals.

== Offseason ==
Following the season, assistant coach Michael Plank departed to join the staff of Justin Joyner at Oregon State.

=== Departures ===
San Francisco Departures
Name	Number	Pos.	Height	Weight	Year	Hometown	Reason for Departure
Ryan Beasley	0	G	5' 11"	205	Junior	San Ramon, CA	Transferred to Washington
Mookie Cook	1	F	6' 6"	215	Junior	Portland, OR	Transferred to San Jose State
Tyrone Riley IV	5	G	6' 6"	205	Sophomore	Downey, CA	Transferred to Oregon
Vukasin Masic	7	G	6' 5"	220	Graduate Student	Belgrade, Serbia	Graduated
David Fuchs	8	F	6' 9"	245	Junior	Vienna, Austria	Transferred to Clemson
Saba Gigiberia	10	C	7' 2"	255	Senior	Tbilisi, Georgia	Graduated
Isa Silva	12	G	6' 4"	190	(redshirt) Senior	Sacramento, CA	Graduated
Legend Smiley	13	G	6' 5"	190	Freshman	Seattle, WA	Transferred to Oregon State
Veniamin Abosi	14	G/F	6' 6"	225	Sophomore	Heraklion, Greece	Transferred to UC Davis
Sean Blakely Drummond	21	G/F	6' 4"	190	Freshman	Palo Alto, CA	Transferred to Oregon State
Weilun Zhao	23	G	6' 0"	175	Freshman	Varese, Italy	Transferred to Florida SouthWestern State College
Guillermo Díaz Graham	25	F	7' 0"	220	Senior	Canary Islands, Spain	Graduated
Junjie Wang	35	F	6' 9"	250	Junior	Xuzhou, China	Transferred to UMass

=== Incoming transfers ===
San Francisco incoming transfers
Name	Number	Pos.	Height	Weight	Year	Hometown	Previous school
Abdul Bashir	5	G	6' 7"	165	Senior	Omaha, NE	Auburn
Ben Oosterbaan	12	F	6' 6"	200	Junior	Hinsdale, IL	St. Thomas (MN)
Ismaila Diagne	44	C	7' 0"	237	Junior	Thiès, Senegal	Gonzaga

=== Recruiting classes ===
==== 2026 recruiting class ====
College recruiting
Name	Hometown	School	Height	Weight	Commit date
Adam Tyson; SG	Taylor, MS	SoCal Academy	6 ft 7 in (2.01 m)	270 lb (120 kg)	Jul 20, 2026
Adam Tyson; SG	Recruit ratings: Rivals: 247Sports: ESPN: (83)				
Andrew Hillman; SG	Yaoundé, Cameroon	Archbishop Riordan High School	6 ft 3 in (1.91 m)	180 lb (82 kg)	Sep 16, 2025
Andrew Hillman; SG	Recruit ratings: Rivals: 247Sports: ESPN: (82)				
Mason Magee; PG	Chandler, AZ	Basha High School	6 ft 0 in (1.83 m)	165 lb (75 kg)	Oct 10, 2025
Mason Magee; PG	Recruit ratings: Rivals: 247Sports: ESPN: (82)				
Jaroslavs Pihtovs; PF	Riga, Latvia	Archbishop Riordan High School	6 ft 9 in (2.06 m)	215 lb (98 kg)	Feb 15, 2026
Jaroslavs Pihtovs; PF	Recruit ratings: Rivals: 247Sports: (NR)				
Dylan Bordón; G	Corrientes, Argentina	CB Canarias	6 ft 3 in (1.91 m)	190 lb (86 kg)	Jun 29, 2026
Dylan Bordón; G	Recruit ratings: No ratings found				
Žiga Daneu; F	Ljubljana, Slovenia	KK Cedevita Olimpija	6 ft 11 in (2.11 m)	214 lb (97 kg)	Aug 14, 2026
Žiga Daneu; F	Recruit ratings: No ratings found				
Wisdom Fode; CG	Des Moines, IA	Bella Vista Private School	6 ft 2 in (1.88 m)	190 lb (86 kg)	Jul 23, 2026
Wisdom Fode; CG	Recruit ratings: No ratings found				
Jaylen Hunter-Coleman; G	Boston, MA	Charlestown High School	6 ft 0 in (1.83 m)	185 lb (84 kg)	Aug 21, 2026
Jaylen Hunter-Coleman; G	Recruit ratings: No ratings found				
Gustav Knudsen; F	Virum, Denmark	Bàsquet Manresa	6 ft 8 in (2.03 m)	198 lb (90 kg)	Jul 14, 2026
Gustav Knudsen; F	Recruit ratings: No ratings found				
Yoav Vitlem; G	Modi'in-Maccabim-Re'ut, Israel	Hapoel Be'er Sheva	6 ft 0 in (1.83 m)	N/A	Jun 18, 2026
Yoav Vitlem; G	Recruit ratings: No ratings found				
Dashel Wiley; G/F	Las Vegas, NV	Faith Lutheran High School	6 ft 5 in (1.96 m)	173 lb (78 kg)	Jul 27, 2026
Dashel Wiley; G/F	Recruit ratings: No ratings found				
Overall recruit ranking: Rivals: 40 247Sports: 81 ESPN: NR
Note: In many cases, Scout, Rivals, 247Sports, On3, and ESPN may conflict in their listings of height and weight.; In these cases, the average was taken. ESPN grades are on a 100-point scale.; Sources: "2026 San Francisco Dons Basketball Commits". Rivals.; "2026 San Francisco Dons Basketball Commits". Scout.; "ESPN". ESPN.; "Scout.com Team Recruiting Rankings". Scout.; "2026 Team Ranking". Rivals.

== Roster ==
2026–27 San Francisco Dons men's basketball team
Players
Coaches

Pos.	#	Name	Height	Weight	Year	Previous school	Hometown
F	0	Adam Tyson	6 ft 7 in (2.01 m)	270 lb (122 kg)	Fr	SoCal Academy	Taylor, Mississippi
G	1	Wisdom Foode	6 ft 2 in (1.88 m)	190 lb (86 kg)	Fr	Bella Vista Private School	Des Moines, Iowa
G	2	Aidan Braccia	6 ft 1 in (1.85 m)	170 lb (77 kg)	RS Sr	Belmont	Hillsborough, California
G	3	Mason McGee (injured)	6 ft 0 in (1.83 m)	165 lb (75 kg)	Fr	Basha High School	Chandler, Arizona
G	5	Abdul Bashir	6 ft 7 in (2.01 m)	165 lb (75 kg)	Sr	Auburn	Omaha, Nebraska
G	7	Yoav Vitlem	6 ft 0 in (1.83 m)	—	Fr	Hapoel Be'er Sheva	Modi'in-Maccabim-Re'ut, Israel
F	8	Gustav Knudsen	6 ft 8 in (2.03 m)	198 lb (90 kg)	Fr	Bàsquet Manresa	Virum, Denmark
F	12	Ben Oosterbaan	6 ft 6 in (1.98 m)	200 lb (91 kg)	RS Jr	St. Thomas (MN)	Hinsdale, Illinois
F	13	Dashel Wiley	6 ft 5 in (1.96 m)	173 lb (78 kg)	Fr	Faith Lutheran High School	Las Vegas, Nevada
G	16	Dylan Bordón	6 ft 3 in (1.91 m)	190 lb (86 kg)	Fr	CB Canarias	Corrientes, Argentina
F	21	Jaroslavs Pihtovs	6 ft 9 in (2.06 m)	215 lb (98 kg)	Fr	Archbishop Riordan High School	Riga, Latvia
G	23	Jalen Hunter-Coleman	6 ft 0 in (1.83 m)	185 lb (84 kg)	Fr	Charlestown High School	Boston, Massachusetts
F	27	Ndewedo Newbury	6 ft 7 in (2.01 m)	235 lb (107 kg)	GS	The Loomis Chaffee School	London, England
F	41	Žiga Daneu	6 ft 11 in (2.11 m)	214 lb (97 kg)	Fr	KK Cedevita Olimpija	Ljubljana, Slovenia
C	44	Ismaila Diagne	7 ft 0 in (2.13 m)	237 lb (108 kg)	Jr	Gonzaga	Thiès, Senegal
G	99	Andrew Hilman	6 ft 4 in (1.93 m)	180 lb (82 kg)	Fr	Archbishop Riordan High School	Yaoundé, Cameroon

Head coach

- Chris Gerlufsen (Randolph–Macon)

Assistant coach(es)

- Jay Duncan (Northwood)
- Kyle Bankhead (Gonzaga)
- Vinnie McGhee (Cal State Northridge)
- Frankie Ferrari (San Francisco)
- Ryan Boatright (Connecticut)

Legend

- (C) Team captain
- (S) Suspended
- (I) Ineligible
- (W) Walk-on
- Injured
- Current redshirt

Roster
Last update: October 16, 2026

== Schedule and results ==
Date time, TV	Rank^{#}	Opponent^{#}	Result	Record	High points	High rebounds	High assists	Site (attendance) city, state
Exhibition
October 13, 2026*; 7:00 p.m., ESPN+		at Arizona	L 69–93	—	22 – Bordón	5 – Oosterbaan	4 – Bordón	McKale Center (12,478); Tucson, AZ
October 26, 2026*; 7:00 p.m.		San Francisco State	W 89–56	—	16 – Tied	6 – Diagne	–	Sobrato Center; San Francisco, CA
Non-conference regular season
November 2, 2026*; 7:00 p.m., ESPN+		Radford	W 76–62	1–0	20 – Bordón	11 – Diagne	7 – Bordón	Sobrato Center (948); San Francisco, CA
November 6, 2026*; 7:00 p.m., ESPN+		North Dakota State	W 79–70	2–0	22 – Tied	8 – Hillman	4 – Bordón	Sobrato Center (995); San Francisco, CA
November 10, 2026*; 7:00 p.m., ESPN+		Montana	W 63–58	3–0	16 – Oosterbaan	10 – Tied	2 – Tied	Sobrato Center (1,139); San Francisco, CA
November 14, 2026*; 4:00 p.m., ESPN+		Portland State	L 68–84	3–1	25 – Knudsen	11 – Diagne	4 – Tied	Sobrato Center (1,137); San Francisco, CA
November 18, 2026*; 7:00 p.m., ESPN+		Louisiana	W 77–56	4–1	18 – Knudsen	7 – Bordón	10 – Bordón	Sobrato Center (748); San Francisco, CA
November 23, 2026*; 1:30 p.m., FloSports		vs. Nevada; Acrisure Series Pod 3						Acrisure Arena; Thousand Palms, CA
November 24, 2026*; 11:00 a.m., CBSSN		vs. Oregon State; Acrisure Series Pod 3						Acrisure Arena; Thousand Palms, CA
November 28, 2026*; 4:00 p.m., ESPN+		Bethune–Cookman						Sobrato Center; San Francisco, CA
December 2, 2026*; 7:00 p.m., ESPN+		UNLV						Sobrato Center; San Francisco, CA
December 5, 2026*; 4:00 p.m., ESPN+		South Dakota						Sobrato Center; San Francisco, CA
December 8, 2026*; 7:00 p.m., ESPN+		Grace University						Sobrato Center; San Francisco, CA
December 12, 2026*		at Fresno State						Save Mart Center; Fresno, CA
December 16, 2026*; 5:30 p.m.		at Texas State						Strahan Arena; San Marcos, TX
December 19, 2026*; 3:00 p.m.		vs. George Washington; Texas Legends College Classic						Comerica Center; Frisco, TX
December 21, 2026*		vs. Tulsa; Texas Legends College Classic						Comerica Center; Frisco, TX
December 29, 2026*; 7:00 p.m., ESPN+		Yale						Sobrato Center; San Francisco, CA
WCC regular season
January 2, 2027; 4:00 p.m., ESPN+		Denver						Sobrato Center; San Francisco, CA
January 7, 2027; 8:00 p.m., ESPN2		at Santa Clara						Leavey Center; Santa Clara, CA
January 13, 2027; ESPN+		at Seattle						Redhawk Center; Seattle, WA
January 16, 2027; ESPN+		at Portland						Chiles Center; Portland, OR
January 19, 2027; 7:00 p.m., CBSSN		Loyola Marymount						Sobrato Center; San Francisco, CA
January 23, 2027; 4:00 p.m., ESPN+		Pepperdine						Sobrato Center; San Francisco, CA
January 27, 2027; 8:00 p.m., ESPN2 / ESPNU		Saint Mary's						Sobrato Center; San Francisco, CA
January 30, 2027; ESPN+		at San Diego						Jenny Craig Pavilion; San Diego, CA
February 3, 2027; ESPN+		at Denver						Hamilton Gymnasium; Denver, CO
February 6, 2027; 8:00 p.m., CBSSN		Pacific						Sobrato Center; San Francisco, CA
February 9, 2027; 8:00 p.m., ESPN2		at Saint Mary's						University Credit Union Pavilion; Moraga, CA
February 13, 2027; 4:00 p.m., ESPN+		Portland						Sobrato Center; San Francisco, CA
February 17, 2027; ESPN+		at Loyola Marymount						Gersten Pavilion; Los Angeles, CA
February 21, 2027; 5:00 p.m., CBSSN		at Pacific						Alex G. Spanos Center; Stockton, CA
February 24, 2027; 8:00 p.m., ESPN2		Santa Clara						Sobrato Center; San Francisco, CA
February 27, 2027; 5:00 p.m., ESPN+		Seattle						Sobrato Center; San Francisco, CA
*Non-conference game. ^{#}Rankings from AP poll. (#) Tournament seedings in parentheses. All times are in Pacific.
