= 2026–27 Portland Pilots men's basketball team =

American college basketball season

2026–27 Portland Pilots men's basketball
- Conference: West Coast Conference
- Record: 4–2 (0–0 WCC)
- Head coach: Shantay Legans (6th season)
- Assistant coaches: Arturo Ormond (4th season); Anthony Separovich (2nd season); Decclan Mclean (2nd season); Matthew Meyer (3rd season); Seth Shaw II (2nd season)
- Home arena: Chiles Center (Capacity: 4,852)

2026–27 West Coast Conference men's basketball standings
	Conf.				Overall
Team	W		L	PCT	W		L	PCT
Santa Clara	0	–	0	–	5	–	0	1.000
Pacific	0	–	0	–	4	–	1	.800
Saint Mary's	0	–	0	–	4	–	1	.800
San Diego	0	–	0	–	4	–	1	.800
San Francisco	0	–	0	–	4	–	1	.800
Portland	0	–	0	–	4	–	2	.667
Seattle	0	–	0	–	3	–	2	.600
Pepperdine	0	–	0	–	2	–	2	.500
Loyola Marymount	0	–	0	–	2	–	3	.400
Denver	0	–	0	–	1	–	3	.250
† 2027 WCC tournament winner As of November 19, 2026; Rankings from AP poll

The 2026–27 Portland Pilots men's basketball team will represent the University of Portland during the 2026–27 NCAA Division I men's basketball season. The Pilots will be led by sixth-year head coach Shantay Legans and will play their home games at Chiles Center in Portland, Oregon as a member of the West Coast Conference.

== Previous season ==
Portland finished the 2025-26 season 15–19, 6–12 in the West Coast Conference to finish tied for ninth in the conference. As the 9-seed in the WCC Tournament the Pilots defeated 12-seed Pepperdine and 8-seed Washington State before falling to 5-seed San Francisco in the Third Round 65–82 to end their season.

=== Departures ===
Portland Pilots departures
Name	Number	Pos.	Height	Weight	Year	Hometown	Reason for departure
Jermaine Ballisager Webb	1	C	7'1"	250	Senior	Stjær, Denmark	Out of eligibility
Sam Noland	2	G	6'1"	185	Graduate	Tualatin, OR	Out of eligibility
Matúš Hronský	7	F	6'8"	205	Senior	Poruba, Slovakia	Out of eligibility
Preston Lee	8	G	5'11"	185	Sophomore	Laguna Hills, CA	Transferred to Cal State Monterey Bay
Garrett Nuckolls	10	G	6'6"	195	Junior	Bullard, TX	Entered transfer portal
Kelson Gebbers	12	G	6'7"	200	(redshirt) Sophomore	Brewster, WA	Departed program
NaVaughn Long	21	G	6'6"	180	(redshirt) Freshman	Livermore, CA	Entered transfer portal
Joel Foxwell	23	G	6'1"	180	Freshman	Melbourne, Australia	Transferred to Arizona State
Cameron Williams	35	F	6'8"	220	Junior	Cape Girardeau, MO	Transferred to Kent State
Mikah Ballew	44	G	6'5"	200	Sophomore	Palmdale, CA	Transferred to Cal State Northridge

=== Incoming transfers ===
Portland Pilots incoming transfers
Name	Number	Pos.	Height	Weight	Year	Hometown	Previous School
Omer Sukur	0	F	6'8"	280	Junior	Mountain View, CA	Cañada College
RJ Nance Jr.	1	G	6'2"	180	Junior	Las Vegas, NV	New Mexico JC
Vito Perkovic	2	F	6'10"	250	Sophomore	Zadar, Croatia	East Carolina
Kaia Isaac	6	G	6'4"	215	Senior	Christchurch, New Zealand	Tarleton State
Jaxon Olvera	10	G	6'5"	190	Junior	New Caney, TX	Louisiana
Hunter Adam	12	G	6'7"	225	Senior	Christchurch, New Zealand	Davidson
Marchelo Moreira	13	G	6'3"	190	(redshirt) Sophomore	Abu Dhabi, United Arab Emirates	Allegheny College
James O'Donnell	14	F	6'10"	230	Junior	Sydney, Australia	San Francisco
Henry Sewell	32	F	6'10"	200	Freshman	Melbourne, Australia	De La Salle

=== 2026 recruiting class ===
College recruiting
Name	Hometown	School	Height	Weight	Commit date
Austin Foxwell; PG	Melbourne, Australia	Rowville Sports Academy	6 ft 2 in (1.88 m)	N/A	Mar 2, 2026
Austin Foxwell; PG	Recruit ratings: (NR)				
Dylan Moran; PG	Los Angeles, CA	Chaminade College Prep	6 ft 3 in (1.91 m)	N/A	May 2, 2026
Dylan Moran; PG	Recruit ratings: (NR)				
Overall recruit ranking: Scout: – Rivals: –
Note: In many cases, Scout, Rivals, 247Sports, On3, and ESPN may conflict in their listings of height and weight.; In these cases, the average was taken. ESPN grades are on a 100-point scale.; Sources: "2026 Portland Basketball Recruiting Commits". Scout.; "Scout.com Team Recruiting Rankings". Scout.; "2026 Team Ranking". Rivals.

== Roster ==
2026–27 Portland Pilots men's basketball team
Players
Coaches

Pos.	#	Name	Height	Weight	Year	Previous school	Hometown
F	0	Omer Sukur	6 ft 8 in (2.03 m)	280 lb (127 kg)	Jr	Cañada College	Mountain View, California
G	1	RJ Nance Jr.	6 ft 2 in (1.88 m)	180 lb (82 kg)	Jr	New Mexico JC	Las Vegas, Nevada
F	2	Vito Perkovic	6 ft 10 in (2.08 m)	250 lb (113 kg)	So	East Carolina	Zadar, Croatia
F	3	Timo George	6 ft 8 in (2.03 m)	245 lb (111 kg)	So	IMG Academy	Amsterdam, Netherlands
G	5	Dante Censori-Hercules	6 ft 7 in (2.01 m)	190 lb (86 kg)	So	Hodan Prep	Toronto, Ontario, Canada
G	6	Kaia Isaac	6 ft 4 in (1.93 m)	215 lb (98 kg)	Sr	Tarleton State	Christchurch, New Zealand
G	9	Carlin Briggs	6 ft 7 in (2.01 m)	190 lb (86 kg)	RS Fr	BA Centre of Excellence	Melbourne, Australia
G	10	Jaxon Olvera	6 ft 5 in (1.96 m)	190 lb (86 kg)	Jr	Louisiana	New Caney, Texas
G	11	Riley Parker	6 ft 2 in (1.88 m)	195 lb (88 kg)	GS	Saint Francis (PA)	Mandurah, Australia
G	12	Hunter Adam	6 ft 7 in (2.01 m)	225 lb (102 kg)	Sr	Davidson	Christchurch, New Zealand
G	13	Marchelo Moreira	6 ft 3 in (1.91 m)	190 lb (86 kg)	RS So	Allegheny College	Abu Dhabi, United Arab Emirates
F	14	James O'Donnell	6 ft 10 in (2.08 m)	230 lb (104 kg)	Jr	San Francisco	Sydney, Australia
G	15	Austin Foxwell	6 ft 3 in (1.91 m)	175 lb (79 kg)	Fr	Rowville Sports Academy	Melbourne, Australia
G	23	Dylan Moran	6 ft 3 in (1.91 m)	170 lb (77 kg)	Fr	Chaminade College Prep	Los Angeles, California
F	32	Henry Sewell	6 ft 10 in (2.08 m)	200 lb (91 kg)	Fr	De La Salle	Melbourne, Australia

Head coach

- Shantay Legans (Fresno State)

Assistant coach(es)

- Arturo Ormond (Texas–Pan American)
- Anthony Separovich (Bloomfield)
- Decclan Mclean (Swinburne Tech)
- Matthew Meyer (Arizona State)
- Seth Shaw II (La Verne)

Legend

- (C) Team captain
- (S) Suspended
- (I) Ineligible
- (W) Walk-on
- Injured
- Current redshirt

Roster

== Schedule and results ==
Date time, TV	Rank^{#}	Opponent^{#}	Result	Record	High points	High rebounds	High assists	Site (attendance) city, state
Non-conference regular season
November 2, 2026*; 5:00 p.m., ESPN+		Willamette	W 133–89	1–0	19 – George	10 – O'Donnell	6 – Olvera	Chiles Center (814); Portland, OR
November 6, 2026*; 6:30 p.m., MW+		vs. UT Arlington; Rainbow Classic	L 85–89	1–1	25 – Nance Jr.	6 – Tied	3 – Tied	Stan Sheriff Center; Honolulu, HI
November 8, 2026*; 4:30 p.m., MW+		vs. Bethesda; Rainbow Classic	W 130–56	2–1	29 – O'Donnell	20 – O'Donnell	6 – Parker	Stan Sheriff Center; Honolulu, HI
November 9, 2026*; 9:00 p.m., MW+		at Hawaii; Rainbow Classic	W 73–66	3–1	18 – O'Donnell	9 – O'Donnell	3 – Tied	Stan Sheriff Center (4,342); Honolulu, HI
November 13, 2026*; 7:00 p.m., ESPN+		East Texas A&M	L 88–94	3–2	31 – Olvera	9 – Adam	4 – Tied	Chiles Center (1,038); Portland, OR
November 18, 2026*; 6:00 p.m., ESPN+		at Colorado	W 77–74	4–2	22 – Olvera	6 – Parker	4 – Nance Jr.	CU Events Center (4,382); Boulder, CO
November 21, 2026*; 11:00 a.m., ESPN+		vs. Fordham; Acrisure Series Pod 5						Acrisure Arena; Thousand Palms, CA
November 22, 2026*; 4:00 p.m., TBD		vs. California Baptist; Acrisure Series Pod 5						Acrisure Arena; Thousand Palms, CA
November 29, 2026*; 2:00 p.m., ACCNX		at Stanford						Maples Pavilion; Stanford, CA
December 1, 2026*; 6:00 p.m., MW+		at UC Davis						University Credit Union Center; Davis, CA
December 10, 2026*; 11:00 a.m., ESPN+		Lamar						Chiles Center; Portland, OR
December 13, 2026*; 2:00 p.m., ESPN+		Eastern Washington						Chiles Center; Portland, OR
December 16, 2026*; 6:00 p.m., ESPN+		at Utah						Jon M. Huntsman Center; Salt Lake City, UT
December 19, 2026*; 5:00 p.m., ESPN+		Wyoming						Chiles Center; Portland, OR
December 22, 2026*; 2:00 p.m., ESPN+		at Long Beach State						LBS Financial Credit Union Pyramid; Long Beach, CA
December 28, 2026*; 2:00 p.m., ESPN+		Evergreen State						Chiles Center; Portland, OR
WCC regular season
January 2, 2027; TBD, ESPN+		Pepperdine						Chiles Center; Portland, OR
January 6, 2027; TBD, ESPN+		Pacific						Chiles Center; Portland, OR
January 9, 2027; TBD, ESPN+		at San Diego						Jenny Craig Pavilion; San Diego, CA
January 13, 2027; 7:00 p.m., ESPN+		at Saint Mary's						University Credit Union Pavilion; Moraga, CA
January 16, 2027; TBD, ESPN+		San Francisco						Chiles Center; Portland, OR
January 20, 2027; TBD, ESPN+		at Denver						Hamilton Gymnasium; Denver, CO
January 23, 2027; 7:00 p.m., ESPN+		at Seattle U						Redhawk Center; Seattle, WA
January 27, 2027; TBD, ESPN+		Santa Clara						Chiles Center; Portland, OR
February 3, 2027; 8:00 p.m., CBSSN		Saint Mary's						Chiles Center; Portland, OR
February 6, 2027; TBD, ESPN+		Loyola Marymount						Chiles Center; Portland, OR
February 10, 2027; 7:30 p.m., ESPN+		at Pacific						Alex G. Spanos Center; Stockton, CA
February 13, 2027; TBD, ESPN+		at San Francisco						Sobrato Center; San Francisco, CA
February 17, 2027; TBD, ESPN+		Denver						Chiles Center; Portland, OR
February 20, 2027; TBD, ESPN+		San Diego						Chiles Center; Portland, OR
February 24, 2027; TBD, ESPN+		at Pepperdine						The Mountain at Mullin Park; Malibu, CA
February 27, 2027; TBD, ESPN+		at Loyola Marymount						Gersten Pavilion; Los Angeles, CA
WCC tournament
March 5, 2027; TBD, TBD		vs. TBD						Orleans Arena; Paradise, NV
*Non-conference game. ^{#}Rankings from AP Poll. (#) Tournament seedings in parentheses. All times are in Pacific Time.
