= 2026–27 San Diego Toreros men's basketball team =

American college basketball season

2026–27 San Diego Toreros men's basketball
- Conference: West Coast Conference
- Record: 2–0 (0–0 WCC)
- Head coach: JR Blount (1st season)
- Assistant coaches: Pat Baldwin (1st season); Jeremy Pope (1st season); David Gale (1st season); Henoc Bienne (1st season)
- Home arena: Jenny Craig Pavilion (Capacity: 5,100)

2026–27 West Coast Conference men's basketball standings
	Conf.				Overall
Team	W		L	PCT	W		L	PCT
Saint Mary's	0	–	0	–	5	–	1	.833
Santa Clara	0	–	0	–	5	–	1	.833
Pacific	0	–	0	–	4	–	1	.800
San Diego	0	–	0	–	4	–	1	.800
San Francisco	0	–	0	–	4	–	1	.800
Portland	0	–	0	–	4	–	2	.667
Seattle	0	–	0	–	3	–	2	.600
Pepperdine	0	–	0	–	3	–	3	.500
Loyola Marymount	0	–	0	–	2	–	3	.400
Denver	0	–	0	–	1	–	3	.250
† 2027 WCC tournament winner As of November 22, 2026; Rankings from AP poll

The 2026–27 San Diego Toreros men's basketball team will represent the University of San Diego during the 2026–27 NCAA Division I men's basketball season. The Toreros will be led by first-year head coach JR Blount and will play their home games at Jenny Craig Pavilion in San Diego, California as a member of the West Coast Conference.

== Previous season ==
San Diego finished the 2025-26 season 12–21, 5–13 in the West Coast Conference to finish eleventh in the conference. As the 11-seed in the WCC Tournament the Toreros defeated 10-seed Loyola Marymount in the First Round before falling to 7-seed Seattle U in the Second round 56–58 to end their season. On February 18, the Toreros announced that head coach Steve Lavin would not be retained following the season. The school offered Lavin the opportunity to finish coaching the season, which he accepted. Three days after the conclusion of the season, on March 9 the Toreros hired Iowa State assistant coach JR Blount as the program's new head coach.

== Offseason ==
=== Departures ===
San Diego Toreros departures
Name	Number	Pos.	Height	Weight	Year	Hometown	Reason for departure
Kjay Bradley Jr.	0	G	6'1"	185	Senior	Inglewood, CA	Transferred to Cal State Bakersfield
Toneari Lane	1	G	6'5"	205	Graduate	Atlanta, GA	Out of eligibility
Adrian McIntyre	2	G	6'3"	195	Graduate	Sylmar, CA	Out of eligibility
D'Arrae Goodwin	3	F	6'6"	205	Freshman	Wheeling, WV	Transferred to Incarnate Word
Juanse Gorosito	4	G	6'0"	185	Senior	Ceres, Argentina	Out of eligibility
Ty-Laur Johnson	5	G	6'0"	155	Junior	Brooklyn, NY	Transferred to Tennessee State
Assane Diop	7	F/C	6'9"	210	Junior	Rufisque, Senegal	Transferred to Kansas City
Josh Hecht	9	G	6'2"	185	(redshirt) Sophomore	Santa Monica, CA	Departed program
Neel Beniwal	10	G	6'5"	185	(redshirt) Junior	Garnet Valley, PA	Departed program
Gavin Ripp	12	F	6'7"	230	(redshirt) Freshman	Los Gatos, CA	Transferred to Pacific
Dominique Ford	14	G	6'5"	200	Graduate	Las Vegas, NV	Out of eligibility
Emmanuel Callas	22	G	6'5"	220	(redshirt) Junior	Oakland, CA	Departed program
Piotr Winkowski	23	C	6'10"	240	Junior	Żyrardów, Poland	Departed program
Brandon Benjamin	24	G	6'6"	210	Freshman	Anaheim, CA	Out of eligibility
Tim Moore Jr.	30	F	6'6"	213	Graduate	Houston, TX	Out of eligibility
Vuk Boskovic	34	F	6'7"	265	Junior	Bileća, Bosnia and Herzegovina	Transferred to Bethune-Cookman

=== Incoming transfers ===
San Diego Toreros incoming transfers
Name	Number	Pos.	Height	Weight	Year	Hometown	Previous School
Davion Hill	2	G	6'2"	225	(redshirt) Junior	Williamsport, PA	Ball State
Dusty Stromer	4	G	6'6"	195	Senior	Sherman Oaks, CA	Grand Canyon
Antonio Munoz	7	F	6'6"	200	Sophomore	Chicago, IL	Grambling State
Jevon Hill	8	F	6'9"	175	Graduate	Wichita, KS	Central Missouri
Marqui Worthy Jr.	10	G	6'4"	215	Senior	Anaheim, CA	UC Riverside
Braylon Roman	11	G	6'3''	185	Junior	Bloomington, IL	Northwest Florida
Jose Roberto Tanchyn	14	F	6'10''	235	Senior	Córdoba, Spain	UMBC
Terry McMorris	24	F	6'6"	185	Junior	Oklahoma City, OK	Eastern Illinois
Sekou Konneh	25	F	6'9"	215	(redshirt) Sophomore	Milwaukee, WI	Milwaukee

=== 2026 recruiting class ===
College recruiting
Name	Hometown	School	Height	Weight	Commit date
Chace Holley; PG	Redondo Beach, CA	Redondo Union HS	6 ft 0 in (1.83 m)	160 lb (73 kg)	Apr 8, 2026
Chace Holley; PG	Recruit ratings: 247Sports: (NR)				
Brannon Martinsen; SF	Santa Ana, CA	Knight HS	6 ft 7 in (2.01 m)	180 lb (82 kg)	Apr 14, 2026
Brannon Martinsen; SF	Recruit ratings: 247Sports: On3: ESPN: (82)				
Overall recruit ranking: Scout: – Rivals: –
Note: In many cases, Scout, Rivals, 247Sports, On3, and ESPN may conflict in their listings of height and weight.; In these cases, the average was taken. ESPN grades are on a 100-point scale.; Sources: "2026 San Diego Basketball Recruiting Commits". Scout.; "Scout.com Team Recruiting Rankings". Scout.; "2026 Team Ranking". Rivals.

== Roster ==
2026–27 San Diego Toreros men's basketball team
Players
Coaches

Pos.	#	Name	Height	Weight	Year	Previous school	Hometown
G	1	Chace Holley	6 ft 0 in (1.83 m)	160 lb (73 kg)	Fr	Redondo Union HS	Lynwood, California
G	2	Davion Hill	6 ft 2 in (1.88 m)	225 lb (102 kg)	RS Jr	Ball State	Williamsport, Pennsylvania
G	4	Dusty Stromer	6 ft 6 in (1.98 m)	195 lb (88 kg)	Sr	Grand Canyon	Sherman Oaks, California
F	5	Brannon Martinsen	6 ft 6 in (1.98 m)	105 lb (48 kg)	Fr	Sierra Canyon School	Santa Ana, California
G	6	Boden Grant	6 ft 4 in (1.93 m)	185 lb (84 kg)	RS Fr	St. Edward HS	Cleveland, Ohio
F	7	Antonio Munoz	6 ft 6 in (1.98 m)	200 lb (91 kg)	So	Grambling State	Chicago, Illinois
F	8	Jevon Hill	6 ft 9 in (2.06 m)	175 lb (79 kg)	GS	Central Missouri	Wichita, Kansas
G	10	Marqui Worthy Jr.	6 ft 4 in (1.93 m)	215 lb (98 kg)	Sr	UC Riverside	Anaheim, California
G	11	Braylon Roman	6 ft 3 in (1.91 m)	185 lb (84 kg)	Jr	Northwest Florida	Bloomington, Illinois
F	14	Jose Roberto Tanchyn	6 ft 10 in (2.08 m)	235 lb (107 kg)	Sr	UMBC	Córdoba, Spain
G	15	Caleb Versher	6 ft 3 in (1.91 m)	190 lb (86 kg)	RS Fr	St. Bernard HS	Los Angeles, California
F	21	Alejandro Aviles	6 ft 9 in (2.06 m)	230 lb (104 kg)	So	Dream City Christian School	San Juan, Puerto Rico
F	24	Terry McMorris	6 ft 6 in (1.98 m)	185 lb (84 kg)	Jr	Eastern Illinois	Oklahoma City, Oklahoma
F	25	Sekou Konneh	6 ft 9 in (2.06 m)	215 lb (98 kg)	RS So	Milwaukee	Milwaukee, Wisconsin
G	53	Nick Del Bosque (W)	6 ft 0 in (1.83 m)	180 lb (82 kg)	RS Jr	Salpointe Catholic HS	Tucson, Arizona

Head coach

- JR Blount (Loyola Chicago)

Assistant coach(es)

- Pat Baldwin (Northwestern)
- Jeremy Pope (Biola)
- David Gale (Loyola Chicago)
- Henoc Bienne (Mercy)

Legend

- (C) Team captain
- (S) Suspended
- (I) Ineligible
- (W) Walk-on
- Injured
- Current redshirt

Roster

== Schedule and results ==
Date time, TV	Rank^{#}	Opponent^{#}	Result	Record	High points	High rebounds	High assists	Site (attendance) city, state
Exhibition
October 25, 2026*; 1:00 p.m., ESPN+		Colorado State	W 73–58		18 – J. Hill	6 – Konneh	4 – D. Hill	Jenny Craig Pavilion (823); San Diego, CA
October 27, 2026*; 7:00 p.m.		at No. 22 UCLA	L 50–82		14 – Stromer	8 – Konneh	2 – Holley	Pauley Pavilion (1,910); Los Angeles, CA
Non-conference regular season
November 2, 2026*; 6:30 p.m., ESPN+		Biola	W 79–62	1–0	15 – Tied	7 – Tied	4 – D. Hill	Jenny Craig Pavilion (1,284); San Diego, CA
November 6, 2026*; 6:30 p.m., ESPN+		Tarleton State	W 96–90 ^{OT}	2–0	22 – Stromer	9 – Tied	4 – Tied	Jenny Craig Pavilion (927); San Diego, CA
November 10, 2026*; 6:00 p.m., ESPN+		at Colorado	L 75–83	2–1	20 – D. Hill	6 – Stromer	4 – Tied	CU Events Center (4,324); Boulder, CO
November 13, 2026*; 6:30 p.m., ESPN+		Chicago State	W 87–67	3–1	18 – J. Hill	13 – Konneh	6 – Tanchyn	Jenny Craig Pavilion (822); San Diego, CA
November 18, 2026*; 6:30 p.m., ESPN+		UC Riverside	W 71–62	4–1	20 – Stromer	9 – McMorris	5 – D. Hill	Jenny Craig Pavilion (826); San Diego, CA
November 21, 2026*; 1:30 p.m., FloSports		vs. UC Irvine; Acrisure Series	W 67–64	5–1	20 – Worthy	6 – Konneh	4 – D. Hill	Acrisure Arena; Thousand Palms, CA
November 22, 2026*; 11:00 a.m., FloSports		vs. Fordham; Acrisure Series						Acrisure Arena; Thousand Palms, CA
November 28, 2026*; 1:00 p.m., ESPN+		Northern Colorado						Jenny Craig Pavilion; San Diego, CA
December 1, 2026*; 6:30 p.m., ESPN+		Hawaii						Jenny Craig Pavilion; San Diego, CA
December 5, 2026*; 1:00 p.m., MW+		at Wyoming						Arena-Auditorium; Laramie, WY
December 8, 2026*; 6:30 p.m., ESPN+		USC						Jenny Craig Pavilion; San Diego, CA
December 11, 2026*; 6:30 p.m., ESPN+		Prairie View A&M						Jenny Craig Pavilion; San Diego, CA
December 20, 2026*; 4:00 p.m., ESPN+		at Arizona State						Desert Financial Arena; Tempe, AZ
December 22, 2026*; 1:00 p.m., ESPN+		Cal State Bakersfield						Jenny Craig Pavilion; San Diego, CA
WCC regular season
January 2, 2027; 7:00 p.m., CBSSN		at Saint Mary's						University Credit Union Pavilion; Moraga, CA
January 6, 2027; TBD, ESPN+		at Loyola Marymount						Gersten Pavilion; Los Angeles, CA
January 9, 2027; TBD, ESPN+		Portland						Jenny Craig Pavilion; San Diego, CA
January 13, 2027; TBD, ESPN+		Santa Clara						Jenny Craig Pavilion; San Diego, CA
January 16, 2027; TBD, ESPN+		Denver						Jenny Craig Pavilion; San Diego, CA
January 20, 2027; 7:00 p.m., ESPN+		at Seattle U						Redhawk Center; Seattle, WA
January 27, 2027; TBD, ESPN+		at Pepperdine						The Mountain at Mullin Park; Malibu, CA
January 30, 2027; TBD, ESPN+		San Francisco						Jenny Craig Pavilion; San Diego, CA
February 3, 2027; TBD, ESPN+		at Pacific						Alex G. Spanos Center; Stockton, CA
February 6, 2027; TBD, ESPN+		at Santa Clara						Leavey Center; Santa Clara, CA
February 10, 2027; TBD		Loyola Marymount						Jenny Craig Pavilion; San Diego, CA
February 13, 2027; TBD, ESPN+		Seattle U						Jenny Craig Pavilion; San Diego, CA
February 17, 2027; TBD, ESPN+		Pepperdine						Jenny Craig Pavilion; San Diego, CA
February 20, 2027; TBA, ESPN+		at Portland						Chiles Center; Portland, OR
February 24, 2027; TBD, ESPN+		Pacific						Jenny Craig Pavilion; San Diego, CA
February 27, 2027; TBD, ESPN+		at Denver						Hamilton Gymnasium; Denver, CO
WCC tournament
March 5, 2027; TBD, TBD		vs. TBD						Orleans Arena; Paradise, NV
*Non-conference game. ^{#}Rankings from AP Poll. (#) Tournament seedings in parentheses. All times are in Pacific Time.
