= 2026–27 Pepperdine Waves men's basketball team =

American college basketball season

2026–27 Pepperdine Waves men's basketball
- Conference: West Coast Conference
- Record: 2–2 (0–0 WCC)
- Head coach: Griff Aldrich (1st season)
- Assistant coaches: Dan Engelstad; Ryan Oliver; Matt Palumbo; Noah Ralby; Chase Coleman
- Home arena: Firestone Fieldhouse; The Mountain at Mullin Park

2026–27 West Coast Conference men's basketball standings
	Conf.				Overall
Team	W		L	PCT	W		L	PCT
Santa Clara	0	–	0	–	5	–	0	1.000
Pacific	0	–	0	–	3	–	1	.750
Saint Mary's	0	–	0	–	3	–	1	.750
San Diego	0	–	0	–	3	–	1	.750
San Francisco	0	–	0	–	3	–	1	.750
Portland	0	–	0	–	3	–	2	.600
Pepperdine	0	–	0	–	2	–	2	.500
Seattle	0	–	0	–	2	–	2	.500
Loyola Marymount	0	–	0	–	2	–	3	.400
Denver	0	–	0	–	0	–	3	.000
† 2027 WCC tournament winner As of November 17, 2026; Rankings from AP poll

The 2026–27 Pepperdine Waves men's basketball team represents Pepperdine University during the 2026–27 NCAA Division I men's basketball season. The Waves, led by first-year head coach Griff Aldrich, play their home games in Malibu, California, beginning the season at Firestone Fieldhouse before moving into The Mountain at Mullin Park in December 2026, as members of the West Coast Conference (WCC). They were picked to finish seventh in the WCC preseason coaches poll.

== Previous season ==
The Waves finished the 2025–26 season 9–23, 4–14 in WCC play to finish in last place. As the No. 12 seed in the WCC tournament, they lost to Portland in the first round.

== Offseason ==
=== Coaching change ===
On March 26, 2026, Pepperdine announced the hiring of Griff Aldrich as head coach, the program's 14th. Aldrich had spent the 2025–26 season as associate head coach at Virginia and previously spent seven seasons as head coach at Longwood, where he compiled a 127–100 record and led the Lancers to two NCAA tournament appearances. He succeeded Ed Schilling, whose teams went 22–45 over two seasons. Aldrich was formally introduced at a press conference on April 7, 2026.

=== Rebuilt Roster and Historic Recruit ===
Under Aldrich, the roster was almost entirely rebuilt. The 2026–27 team includes 13 newcomers, and only David Mager and Anto Balian return from the 2025–26 roster; the program is one of 16 in Division I returning less than six percent of its previous season's scoring.

The newcomers include freshman Alex Constanza, a 6-foot-8 wing who is a consensus four-star prospect and the highest-ranked recruit in program history, rated No. 47 in the ESPN SCNEXT 100. The class also includes seven transfers with prior NCAA Division I experience: Evan Haywood, Will McClendon, Jahari Williamson, Youri Fritz, Petar Majstorovic, Ethan Meuser and Anthony Robinson. The Waves also added four international players with professional experience (Dontae Russo-Nance, Oren Sahar, Faruk Biberovic and Oliver Kanden).

=== New arena ===
The 2026–27 season is scheduled to be the first for the Waves at The Mountain at Mullin Park, with the team opening the season at Firestone Fieldhouse before relocating to the new arena in December. The first game at the new arena is scheduled for December 5 against Florida Gulf Coast, and the final game at Firestone Fieldhouse is scheduled for November 25 against Cal State Bakersfield.

== Preseason ==
Pepperdine was picked to finish seventh in the WCC Preseason Coaches Poll. Petar Majstorovic and Will McClendon were named to the All-WCC Preseason Team.

== Roster ==
2026–27 Pepperdine Waves men's basketball team
Players
Coaches

Pos.	#	Name	Height	Weight	Year	Previous school	Hometown
G	0	Oren Sahar	6 ft 4 in (1.93 m)	—	Fr	Maccabi Tel Aviv	Tel Aviv, Israel
G	1	David Mager	6 ft 4 in (1.93 m)	—	GS	Dwight-Englewood School	Englewood, NJ
G	2	Will McClendon	6 ft 3 in (1.91 m)	—	GS	Bishop Gorman; UCLA; San Jose State; North Texas	Sacramento, CA
F	3	Petar Majstorovic	6 ft 8 in (2.03 m)	—	Jr	Syracuse; Long Beach State	Sombor, Serbia
G	4	Dontae Russo-Nance	6 ft 3 in (1.91 m)	—	Fr	Oak Hill Academy; Perth Wildcats	Auckland, New Zealand
G	5	Evan Haywood	6 ft 4 in (1.93 m)	—	Jr	Brebeuf Jesuit; Butler	Carmel, IN
F	8	Faruk Biberovic	6 ft 10 in (2.08 m)	—	Fr	Fenerbahçe	Zenica, Bosnia and Herzegovina
F	9	Youri Fritz	6 ft 9 in (2.06 m)	—	GS	Canisius; Northeastern	Tiel, Netherlands
G	11	Colin Chou	6 ft 5 in (1.96 m)	—	So	Los Altos	Los Altos, CA
F	14	Oliver Kanden	6 ft 6 in (1.98 m)	—	Fr	Kauhajoki	Loimaa, Finland
F	21	Anthony Robinson	6 ft 10 in (2.08 m)	—	Sr	Christ School; Virginia; Xavier	Atlanta, GA
F	22	Ethan Meuser	6 ft 8 in (2.03 m)	—	GS	The Hill School; Stonehill	Shavertown, PA
G/F	23	Alex Constanza	6 ft 8 in (2.03 m)	—	Fr	Spire Academy	Miami, FL
G	25	Anto Balian	6 ft 1 in (1.85 m)	—	So	Pilibos	Glendale, CA
G	99	Jahari Williamson	6 ft 1 in (1.85 m)	—	Sr	Royal Crown Academy; Valparaiso; Niagara; Kent State	Pickering, Ontario, Canada

Head coach

- Griff Aldrich

Assistant coach(es)

- Dan Engelstad (associate head coach)
- Ryan Oliver (player development and video coordinator)
- Matt Palumbo
- Noah Ralby
- Chase Coleman
- Graham Bousley
- Aleks Abrams

Legend

- (C) Team captain
- (S) Suspended
- (I) Ineligible
- (W) Walk-on
- Injured
- Current redshirt

Roster
Last update: October 31, 2026

== Schedule and results ==
Date time, TV	Rank^{#}	Opponent^{#}	Result	Record	Site city, state
Non-conference regular season
November 2, 2026*; 3:00 p.m., ESPN+		at Cornell	L 85–86	0–1	Newman Arena (684); Ithaca, NY
November 5, 2026*; 7:30 p.m., ESPN+		La Sierra	W 106–66	1–1	Firestone Fieldhouse (1,127); Malibu, CA
November 7, 2026*; 6:00 p.m., ESPN+		Bethesda (CA)	W 116–43	2–1	Firestone Fieldhouse (570); Malibu, CA
November 11, 2026*; 4:30 p.m., ESPN+		at Sam Houston	L 77–85	2–2	Bernard Johnson Coliseum (1,100); Huntsville, TX
November 15, 2026*; 2:00 p.m., B1G+		at Oregon	Postponed due to FAA nationwide ground stop, makeup TBD		Matthew Knight Arena; Eugene, OR
November 19, 2026*; 6:00 p.m., ESPN+		UC Santa Barbara			Firestone Fieldhouse; Malibu, CA
November 23, 2026*; 6:30 p.m., ESPN+		UNC Greensboro			Firestone Fieldhouse; Malibu, CA
November 25, 2026*; 5:00 p.m., ESPN+		Cal State Bakersfield			Firestone Fieldhouse; Malibu, CA
November 28, 2026*; 10:30 a.m.		vs. Lehigh; Gratitude Thanksgiving Classic			Gilbert Sports and Fitness Center; Thousand Oaks, CA
December 1, 2026*; 5:00 p.m., ESPN+		at Abilene Christian			Moody Coliseum; Abilene, TX
December 5, 2026*; 5:00 p.m., ESPN+		Florida Gulf Coast			The Mountain at Mullin Park; Malibu, CA
December 9, 2026*; 6:30 p.m., ESPN+		Prairie View A&M			The Mountain at Mullin Park; Malibu, CA
December 13, 2026*; 2:00 p.m., ESPN+		at Sacramento State			Hornets Nest; Sacramento, CA
December 18, 2026*; 6:00 p.m., ESPN+		at Montana			Dahlberg Arena; Missoula, MT
December 21, 2026*; 4:00 p.m., ESPN+		Quinnipiac			The Mountain at Mullin Park; Malibu, CA
December 29, 2026*; 7:00 p.m., ESPN+		at Loyola Marymount			Gersten Pavilion; Los Angeles, CA
WCC regular season
January 2, 2027; ESPN+		at Portland			Chiles Center; Portland, OR
January 6, 2027; 7:00 p.m., ESPN+		at Seattle			Redhawk Center; Seattle, WA
January 9, 2027; 6:00 p.m., ESPN+		Loyola Marymount			The Mountain at Mullin Park; Malibu, CA
January 13, 2027; 6:30 p.m., ESPN+		Denver			The Mountain at Mullin Park; Malibu, CA
January 16, 2027; 3:00 p.m., ESPN+		Saint Mary's			The Mountain at Mullin Park; Malibu, CA
January 20, 2027; 7:00 p.m., ESPN+		at Santa Clara			Leavey Center; Santa Clara, CA
January 23, 2027; 4:00 p.m., ESPN+		at San Francisco			War Memorial Gymnasium at the Sobrato Center; San Francisco, CA
January 27, 2027; 6:30 p.m., ESPN+		San Diego			The Mountain at Mullin Park; Malibu, CA
January 30, 2027; ESPN+		at Pacific			Alex G. Spanos Center; Stockton, CA
February 6, 2027; ESPN+		at Denver			Hamilton Gymnasium; Denver, CO
February 10, 2027; 6:30 p.m., ESPN+		Seattle			The Mountain at Mullin Park; Malibu, CA
February 13, 2027; 6:00 p.m., ESPN+		Santa Clara			The Mountain at Mullin Park; Malibu, CA
February 17, 2027; ESPN+		at San Diego			Jenny Craig Pavilion; San Diego, CA
February 21, 2027; 5:00 p.m., ESPN+		at Saint Mary's			University Credit Union Pavilion; Moraga, CA
February 24, 2027; 6:30 p.m., ESPN+		Portland			The Mountain at Mullin Park; Malibu, CA
February 27, 2027; 6:00 p.m., ESPN+		Pacific			The Mountain at Mullin Park; Malibu, CA
WCC tournament
*Non-conference game. ^{#}Rankings from AP Poll. (#) Tournament seedings in parentheses. All times are in Pacific Time.
