= 2026–27 Denver Pioneers men's basketball team =

American college basketball season

2026–27 Denver Pioneers men's basketball
- Conference: West Coast Conference
- Record: 1–4 (0–0 WCC)
- Head coach: Tim Bergstraser (2nd season)
- Associate head coach: Spenser Bland (2nd season)
- Assistant coaches: Kyle Heikkinen (2nd season); Cory Dixon (1st season)
- Home arena: Hamilton Gymnasium (Capacity: 2,500)

2026–27 West Coast Conference men's basketball standings
	Conf.				Overall
Team	W		L	PCT	W		L	PCT
Saint Mary's	0	–	0	–	5	–	1	.833
Santa Clara	0	–	0	–	5	–	1	.833
Pacific	0	–	0	–	4	–	1	.800
San Diego	0	–	0	–	4	–	1	.800
San Francisco	0	–	0	–	4	–	1	.800
Portland	0	–	0	–	4	–	2	.667
Seattle	0	–	0	–	3	–	2	.600
Pepperdine	0	–	0	–	3	–	3	.500
Loyola Marymount	0	–	0	–	2	–	3	.400
Denver	0	–	0	–	1	–	3	.250
† 2027 WCC tournament winner As of November 22, 2026; Rankings from AP poll

The 2026–27 Denver Pioneers men's basketball team will represent the University of Denver during the 2026–27 NCAA Division I men's basketball season. The Pioneers will be led by second-year head coach Tim Bergstraser and will play their home games at Hamilton Gymnasium in Denver, Colorado as a member of the West Coast Conference. This will mark Denver's first season as members of the West Coast Conference after spending the previous fourteen seasons as members of the Summit League.

== Previous season ==
Denver finished the 2025-26 season 15–17, 8–8 in the Summit League to finish tied for fourth in the conference. As the 6-seed in the Summit League Tournament the Pioneers were defeated by 3-seed North Dakota 67-83 to end their season.

== Offseason ==
=== Departures ===
Denver Pioneers departures
Name	Number	Pos.	Height	Weight	Year	Hometown	Reason for departure
Jeremiah Burke	0	F	6'7"	220	Graduate	Milwaukee, WI	Out of eligibility
Devin Carney	2	G	6'1"	185	(redshirt) Junior	Butler, PA	Departed program
Corleone Dandridge	4	G	6'5"	185	(redshirt) Freshman	Milwaukee, WI	Departed program
Logan Kinsey	5	F	6'6"	215	Senior	Blaine, MN	Out of eligibility
Trajan Thompson	6	G	6'6"	190	Freshman	Charlotte, NC	Departed program
Zane Nelson	7	G	6'4"	185	Graduate	Birmingham, AL	Out of eligibility
Julius Rollins	8	G	6'7"	210	Graduate	Chicago, IL	Out of eligibility
Kaden Holdbrook	11	G	6'2"	190	Junior	Palo Alto, CA	Departed program
Josh Lee	13	G	6'3''	200	Senior	Canton, MI	Out of eligibility
Didier Maleng	21	F	6'9''	225	Junior	Kinshasa, DR Congo	Transferred to Southern Indiana
Loch Cunningham	30	F	6'5"	200	Sophomore	Austin, TX	Departed program
Gabe Oldham	32	F	6'8"	230	Junior	Spanish Fork, UT	Departed program

=== Incoming transfers ===
Denver Pioneers incoming transfers
Name	Number	Pos.	Height	Weight	Year	Hometown	Previous School
Charlie Dimmick	0	F	6'9''	245	Sophomore	Perth, Australia	College of Southern Idaho
Kam Martin	2	G	6'4"	175	Junior	Montgomery County, MD	Samford
Jordan Rogers	3	G/F	6'6"	215	Junior	Ridgewood, NJ	NJIT
Harry Bates	4	F	6'9''	240	Senior	Port Macquarie, Australia	Temple College
Jaelen Nelson	7	G	6'4"	190	Junior	West Palm Beach, FL	Edward Waters
Oskar Wickström Stümer	8	F	6'8"	225	Sophomore	Stockholm, Sweden	Howard
Logan Threatt	10	G	6'3''	190	Graduate	Belmont, NC	Queens
CJ Hyland	11	G	5'11"	170	Junior	Atlanta, GA	Western Carolina
Spencer Mahoney	12	F	6'8"	230	Senior	New York, NY	Temple
Baba Mbengue	21	C	7'0''	250	Senior	Guédiawaye, Senegal	Kansas City
Trey Cady	22	G	6'9''	220	Sophomore	Marion, OH	North Florida

=== 2026 recruiting class ===
College recruiting
Name	Hometown	School	Height	Weight	Commit date
Will Kirsch; CG	Waconia, MN	Waconia HS	6 ft 1 in (1.85 m)	180 lb (82 kg)	Apr 25, 2026
Will Kirsch; CG	Recruit ratings: (NR)				
Overall recruit ranking: Scout: – Rivals: –
Note: In many cases, Scout, Rivals, 247Sports, On3, and ESPN may conflict in their listings of height and weight.; In these cases, the average was taken. ESPN grades are on a 100-point scale.; Sources: "2026 Denver Basketball Recruiting Commits". Scout.; "Scout.com Team Recruiting Rankings". Scout.; "2026 Team Ranking". Rivals.

== Roster ==
2026–27 Denver Pioneers men's basketball team
Players
Coaches

Pos.	#	Name	Height	Weight	Year	Previous school	Hometown
F	0	Charlie Dimmick	6 ft 9 in (2.06 m)	245 lb (111 kg)	So	College of Southern Idaho	Perth, Australia
F	1	Shaun Wysocki	6 ft 7 in (2.01 m)	205 lb (93 kg)	Jr	Minnesota State–Moorhead	Rochester, Minnesota
G	2	Kam Martin	6 ft 4 in (1.93 m)	175 lb (79 kg)	Jr	Samford	Montgomery County, Maryland
G/F	3	Jordan Rogers	6 ft 6 in (1.98 m)	215 lb (98 kg)	Jr	NJIT	Ridgewood, New Jersey
F	4	Harry Bates	6 ft 9 in (2.06 m)	240 lb (109 kg)	Sr	Temple College	Port Macquarie, Australia
G	5	Will Kirsch	6 ft 1 in (1.85 m)	180 lb (82 kg)	Fr	Waconia HS	Waconia, Minnesota
G	7	Jaelen Nelson	6 ft 4 in (1.93 m)	190 lb (86 kg)	Jr	Edward Waters	West Palm Beach, Florida
F	8	Oskar Wickström Stümer	6 ft 8 in (2.03 m)	225 lb (102 kg)	So	Howard	Stockholm, Sweden
G	10	Logan Threatt	6 ft 3 in (1.91 m)	190 lb (86 kg)	GS	Queens	Belmont, North Carolina
G	11	CJ Hyland	5 ft 11 in (1.8 m)	170 lb (77 kg)	Jr	Western Carolina	Atlanta, Georgia
F	12	Spencer Mahoney	6 ft 8 in (2.03 m)	230 lb (104 kg)	Sr	Temple	New York, New York
G	20	Carson Johnson	6 ft 1 in (1.85 m)	185 lb (84 kg)	Jr	Minnesota State–Moorhead	Ankeny, Iowa
C	21	Baba Mbengue	7 ft 0 in (2.13 m)	250 lb (113 kg)	Sr	Kansas City	Guédiawaye, Senegal
G	22	Trey Cady	6 ft 9 in (2.06 m)	220 lb (100 kg)	So	North Florida	Marion, Ohio

Head coach

- Tim Bergstraser (St. Cloud State)

Assistant coach(es)

- Spenser Bland (Bethel)
- Kyle Heikkinen (UW–Whitewater)
- Cory Dixon (New Orleans)

Legend

- (C) Team captain
- (S) Suspended
- (I) Ineligible
- (W) Walk-on
- Injured
- Current redshirt

Roster

== Schedule and results ==
Date time, TV	Rank^{#}	Opponent^{#}	Result	Record	High points	High rebounds	High assists	Site (attendance) city, state
Exhibition
October 10, 2026*; 2:00 p.m.		at Utah State	L 76–86	–	16 – Johnson	6 – Hyland	2 – Tied	Smith Spectrum (2,882); Logan, UT
Non-conference regular season
November 2, 2026*; 5:30 p.m., B1G+		at Wisconsin	L 68–75	0–1	27 – Johnson	6 – Martin	2 – Tied	Kohl Center (13,518); Madison, WI
November 7, 2026*; 5:30 p.m., ESPN+		at UC Riverside	L 60–64	0–2	14 – Martin	9 – Wysocki	2 – Threatt	SRC Arena (1,012); Riverside, CA
November 14, 2026*; 1:00 p.m., ESPN+		Wyoming	L 53–76	0–3	17 – Martin	8 – Stümer	1 – Tied	Hamilton Gymnasium (1,803); Denver, CO
November 16, 2026*; 8:00 p.m., ESPN+		UCCS	W 101–63	1–3	22 – Johnson	6 – Tied	6 – Johnson	Hamilton Gymnasium (593); Denver, CO
November 21, 2026*; 11:00 a.m., ESPN+		at Eastern Michigan	L 68–70	1–4	19 – Johnson	9 – Stümer	3 – Johnson	George Gervin GameAbove Center (1,380); Ypsilanti, MI
November 23, 2026*; 6:00 p.m., ESPN+		at Kansas						Allen Fieldhouse; Lawrence, KS
November 28, 2026*; 1:00 p.m., ESPN+		at New Mexico State						Pan American Center; Las Cruces, NM
December 1, 2026*; 7:00 p.m., MW+		at Air Force						Clune Arena; Colorado Springs, CO
December 5, 2026*; 2:00 p.m., ESPN+		at SIU Edwardsville						First Community Arena; Edwardsville, IL
December 8, 2026*; 4:30 p.m., SLN		at Kansas City; Fountain City Happy Hour Classic						Municipal Auditorium; Kansas City, MO
December 9, 2026*; 2:00 p.m., TBD		vs. Sam Houston; Fountain City Happy Hour Classic						Municipal Auditorium; Kansas City, MO
December 11, 2026*; 11:00 a.m., ESPN+		at UTSA						Convocation Center; San Antonio, TX
December 14, 2026*; 7:00 p.m., ESPN+		at Utah Tech						Burns Arena; St. George, UT
December 16, 2026*; 6:30 p.m., ESPN+		Colorado Christian						Hamilton Gymnasium; Denver, CO
December 19, 2026*; 1:00 p.m., ESPN+		Rice						Hamilton Gymnasium; Denver, CO
December 29, 2026*; 7:00 p.m., ESPN+		at Colorado						CU Events Center; Boulder, CO
WCC regular season
January 2, 2027; 5:00 p.m., ESPN+		at San Francisco						Sobrato Center; San Francisco, CA
January 6, 2027; TBD, ESPN+		Saint Mary's						Hamilton Gymnasium; Denver, CO
January 9, 2027; TBD, ESPN+		Seattle U						Hamilton Gymnasium; Denver, CO
January 13, 2027; 8:00 p.m., ESPN+		at Pepperdine						The Mountain at Mullin Park; Malibu, CA
January 16, 2027; TBD, ESPN+		at San Diego						Jenny Craig Pavilion; San Diego, CA
January 20, 2027; TBD, ESPN+		Portland						Hamilton Gymnasium; Denver, CO
January 27, 2027; TBD, ESPN+		at Pacific						Alex G. Spanos Center; Stockton, CA
January 30, 2027; TBD, ESPN+		at Loyola Marymount						Gersten Pavilion; Los Angeles, CA
February 3, 2027; TBD, ESPN+		San Francisco						Hamilton Gymnasium; Denver, CO
February 6, 2027; TBD, ESPN+		Pepperdine						Hamilton Gymnasium; Denver, CO
February 10, 2027; TBD, ESPN+		at Santa Clara						Leavey Center; Santa Clara, CA
February 13, 2027; TBD, ESPN+		Pacific						Hamilton Gymnasium; Denver, CO
February 17, 2027; TBD, ESPN+		at Portland						Chiles Center; Portland, OR
February 20, 2027; 8:00 p.m., ESPN+		at Seattle U						Redhawk Center; Seattle, WA
February 24, 2027; TBD, ESPN+		Loyola Marymount						Hamilton Gymnasium; Denver, CO
February 27, 2027; TBD, ESPN+		San Diego						Hamilton Gymnasium; Denver, CO
WCC tournament
March 5, 2027; TBD, TBD		vs. TBD						Orleans Arena; Paradise, NV
*Non-conference game. ^{#}Rankings from AP Poll. (#) Tournament seedings in parentheses. All times are in Mountain Time.
