= 2026–27 Pacific Tigers men's basketball team =

American college basketball season

2026–27 Pacific Tigers men's basketball
- Conference: West Coast Conference
- Record: 2–0 (0–0 WCC)
- Head coach: Dave Smart (3rd season)
- Assistant coaches: Garrett Bridges; Brandon Cole; Mike Kelly; Howard Washington
- Home arena: Alex G. Spanos Center

2026–27 West Coast Conference men's basketball standings
	Conf.				Overall
Team	W		L	PCT	W		L	PCT
Santa Clara	0	–	0	–	5	–	0	1.000
Pacific	0	–	0	–	4	–	1	.800
Saint Mary's	0	–	0	–	4	–	1	.800
San Diego	0	–	0	–	4	–	1	.800
San Francisco	0	–	0	–	4	–	1	.800
Portland	0	–	0	–	4	–	2	.667
Seattle	0	–	0	–	3	–	2	.600
Pepperdine	0	–	0	–	2	–	2	.500
Loyola Marymount	0	–	0	–	2	–	3	.400
Denver	0	–	0	–	1	–	3	.250
† 2027 WCC tournament winner As of November 19, 2026; Rankings from AP poll

The 2026–27 Pacific Tigers men's basketball team represent the University of the Pacific during the 2026-27 NCAA Division I men's basketball season. The Tigers, are led by third-year head coach Dave Smart, and they are playing their home games at the Alex G. Spanos Center in Stockton, California as members of the West Coast Conference (WCC).

== Previous season ==
The Tigers finished the 2025-26 season 18–15, 8–10 in WCC play to finish in a three-way tie for fifth place with (San Francisco), and (Seattle). As the 6th seed in the WCC Tournament where they get a double-bye to the third-round, and they would beat 7th seed Seattle 61–58 in the third-round, but would lose to 3rd seed Santa Clara 76–68 in the Quarterfinals.

== Preseason ==
On October 15, 2026, the West Coast Conference released their preseason poll. Pacific was picked to finish fifth in the conference.

=== Preseason rankings ===
WCC Preseason Poll
Place	Team	Votes
1	Santa Clara	81 (9)
2	Saint Mary's	70 (1)
3	San Francisco	58
4	Seattle	54
5	Pacific	53
6	Loyola Marymount	46
7	Pepperdine	30
8	San Diego	26
9	Portland	22
10	Denver	10
(#) first-place votes

=== Preseason All-WCC Team ===
No players were named to the Preseason All-WCC Team.

== Roster ==
2026–27 Pacific Tigers men's basketball team
Players
Coaches

Pos.	#	Name	Height	Weight	Year	Previous school	Hometown
G	0	Damarion Vann-Kelly	6 ft 5 in (1.96 m)	—	Jr	Northwest Florida State	Sacramento, California
G	2	Jaden Winston	6 ft 0 in (1.83 m)	—	Sr	Manhattan	South Laurel, Maryland
G	3	CJ Jones	6 ft 5 in (1.96 m)	—	GS	Kansas State	East St. Louis, Illinois
G	7	Nishayne Sharpe	5 ft 11 in (1.8 m)	—	Fr	Bella Vista Prep	London, Ontario
G	8	Dominick Harris	6 ft 3 in (1.91 m)	—	GS	Loyola Chicago	Murrieta, California
F	10	Vincent Osazee	6 ft 8 in (2.03 m)	—	Fr	Reason Prep	Dublin, Ireland
G	11	Andrej Mitrevski	6 ft 5 in (1.96 m)	—	Fr	KK Pelister	Skopje, North Macedonia
F	12	Gavin Ripp	6 ft 7 in (2.01 m)	—	RS So	San Diego	Los Gatos, California
C	13	Jacob McFarland	6 ft 11 in (2.11 m)	—	RS Jr	Houston	Moreno Valley, California
F	15	Jaion Pitt	6 ft 7 in (2.01 m)	230 lb (104 kg)	So	Bella Vista Prep	Norwood, Ontario
G	21	Adriel Nyorha	6 ft 5 in (1.96 m)	—	So	South Florida	Ottawa, Ontario
F/C	22	Jorge Carot	6 ft 9 in (2.06 m)	—	Fr	Valencia Basket	Valencia, Spain
F	24	Jaylen Thompson	6 ft 7 in (2.01 m)	—	RS Sr	Stanford	Oakland, California
G	25	Noah Budu	6 ft 1 in (1.85 m)	—	Jr	American Canyon High School	American Canyon, California
G	30	Connor Amundsen	5 ft 11 in (1.8 m)	—	Jr	Dartmouth	Fresno, California
C	40	Ivan Matlekovic	7 ft 0 in (2.13 m)	—	Jr	North Carolina	Sisak, Croatia

Head coach

- Dave Smart (Queens (ON))

Assistant coach(es)

- Garrett Bridges (St. Augustine's)
- Brandon Cole (Ashford)
- Mike Kelly (Westmont)
- Howard Washington (Syracuse)

Legend

- (C) Team captain
- (S) Suspended
- (I) Ineligible
- (W) Walk-on
- Injured
- Current redshirt

Roster
Last update: November 6, 2026

== Schedule and results ==
Date time, TV	Rank^{#}	Opponent^{#}	Result	Record	High points	High rebounds	High assists	Site (attendance) city, state
Non-conference regular season
November 3, 2026*; 7:00 pm, ESPN+		Bethesda	W 102–47	1–0	21 – Thompson	8 – Ripp	7 – Tied	Alex G. Spanos Center (1,025); Stockton, CA
November 7, 2026*; 5:00 pm, ESPN+		at Bradley	W 63–52	2–0	20 – Winston	12 – Ripp	3 – Pitt	Carver Arena (4,721); Peoria, IL
November 11, 2026*; 7:00 pm, ESPN+		at Long Beach State	L 59–62	2–1	20 – Pitt	12 – Ripp	4 – Nyorha	LBS Financial Credit Union Pyramid (1,470); Long Beach, CA
November 15, 2026 (Note: Postponed from November 14 due to nationwide ground stop.)*; 1:00 pm, ESPN+		Air Force	W 93–69	3–1	29 – Nyorha	8 – Nyorha	7 – Nyorha	Alex G. Spanos Center (1,066); Stockton, CA
November 17, 2026*; 7:00 pm, ESPN+		Pacific Union	W 96–41	4–1	20 – Vann-Kelly	10 – Pitt	12 – Jones	Alex G. Spanos Center (1,016); Stockton, CA
November 21, 2026*; 7:00 pm, ESPN+		Bradley						Alex G. Spanos Center; Stockton, CA
November 25, 2026*; 7:30 pm		vs. Jacksonville State; Resorts World Classic						Resorts World Event Center; Winchester, NV
November 26, 2026*; 7:30 pm		vs. Omaha; Resorts World Classic						Resorts World Event Center; Winchester, NV
November 27, 2026*; 5:00 pm		vs. UC Davis; Resorts World Classic						Resorts World Event Center; Winchester, NV
December 2, 2026*; 7:00 pm, MW+		at Nevada						Lawlor Events Center; Reno, NV
December 6, 2026*; 1:00 pm, ACCNX		at Stanford						Maples Pavilion; Stanford, CA
December 12, 2026*; 2:00 pm, ESPN+		Utah Valley						Alex G. Spanos Center; Stockton, CA
December 15, 2026*; 5:30 pm, ESPN+		at New Mexico State						Pan American Center; Las Cruces, NM
December 18, 2026*; 8:00 pm, ESPN+		Southern						Alex G. Spanos Center; Stockton, CA
December 22, 2026*; 7:00 pm, ESPN+		at Sacramento State						Hornet Pavilion; Sacramento, CA
December 29, 2026*; 6:00 pm, YouTube		at Utah State						Smith Spectrum; Logan, UT
WCC regular season
January 2, 2027; 4:00 pm, ESPN+		Santa Clara						Alex G. Spanos Center; Stockton, CA
January 6, 2027; 7:00 pm, ESPN+		at Portland						Chiles Center; Portland, OR
January 12, 2027; 8:00 pm, ESPNU		at Loyola Marymount						Gersten Pavilion; Los Angeles, CA
January 16, 2027; 4:00 pm, ESPN+		Seattle						Alex G. Spanos Center; Stockton, CA
January 20, 2027; 8:00 pm, CBSSN		at Saint Mary's						University Credit Union Pavilion; Moraga, CA
January 23, 2027; 4:00 pm, ESPN+		at Santa Clara						Leavey Center; Santa Clara, CA
January 27, 2027; 7:00 pm, ESPN+		Denver						Alex G. Spanos Center; Stockton, CA
January 30, 2027; 7:00 pm, ESPN+		Pepperdine						Alex G. Spanos Center; Stockton, CA
February 3, 2027; 7:00 pm, ESPN+		San Diego						Alex G. Spanos Center; Stockton, CA
February 6, 2027; 8:00 pm, CBSSN		at San Francisco						Sobrato Center; San Francisco, CA
February 10, 2027; 7:00 pm, ESPN+		Portland						Alex G. Spanos Center; Stockton, CA
February 13, 2027; 5:00 pm, ESPN+		at Denver						Hamilton Gymnasium; Denver, CO
February 18, 2027; 7:30 pm, CBSSN		Saint Mary's						Alex G. Spanos Center; Stockton, CA
February 21, 2027; 5:00 pm, CBSSN		San Francisco						Alex G. Spanos Center; Stockton, CA
February 24, 2027; ESPN+		at San Diego						Jenny Craig Pavilion; San Diego, CA
February 27, 2027; 6:00 pm, ESPN+		at Pepperdine						The Mountain at Mullin Park; Malibu, CA
WCC tournament
March 5–9, 2027		vs.						Orleans Arena; Paradise, NV
*Non-conference game. ^{#}Rankings from AP poll. (#) Tournament seedings in parentheses. All times are in Pacific.
