= 2026–27 Saint Mary's Gaels men's basketball team =

American college basketball season

2026–27 Saint Mary's Gaels men's basketball
- Conference: West Coast Conference
- Record: 5–1 (0–0 WCC)
- Head coach: Mickey McConnell (1st season)
- Associate head coach: Hardy Asprilla (1st season); Chris Cobb (1st season)
- Assistant coaches: Rob Jones (1st season); Dan Sheets (4th season); Trey Touchet (4th season)
- Home arena: University Credit Union Pavilion (Capacity: 3,500)

2026–27 West Coast Conference men's basketball standings
	Conf.				Overall
Team	W		L	PCT	W		L	PCT
Saint Mary's	0	–	0	–	5	–	1	.833
Santa Clara	0	–	0	–	5	–	1	.833
Pacific	0	–	0	–	4	–	1	.800
San Diego	0	–	0	–	4	–	1	.800
San Francisco	0	–	0	–	4	–	1	.800
Portland	0	–	0	–	4	–	2	.667
Seattle	0	–	0	–	3	–	2	.600
Pepperdine	0	–	0	–	3	–	3	.500
Loyola Marymount	0	–	0	–	2	–	3	.400
Denver	0	–	0	–	1	–	3	.250
† 2027 WCC tournament winner As of November 21, 2026; Rankings from AP poll

The 2026–27 Saint Mary's Gaels men's basketball team will represent Saint Mary's College of California during the 2026–27 NCAA Division I men's basketball season. The Gaels will be led by first-year head coach Mickey McConnell and will play their home games at University Credit Union Pavilion in Moraga, California as a member of the West Coast Conference.

== Previous season ==
Saint Mary's finished the 2025-26 season 27–6, 16–2 in the West Coast Conference to finish tied for first in the conference. As the 2-seed in the WCC Tournament the Gaels were defeated by 3-seed Santa Clara. Saint Mary's was invited to participate in the NCAA tournament as a 7-seed in the South Region. The Gaels were defeated by 7-seed Texas A&M in the First round 50–63 to end their season.

Four days after the season's conclusion, head coach Randy Bennett left to take the same position at Arizona State. On March 23, 2026, the school named associate head coach Mickey McConnell the team's new head coach.

== Offseason ==
=== Departures ===
Saint Mary's Gaels departures
Name	Number	Pos.	Height	Weight	Year	Hometown	Reason for departure
Mikey Lewis	0	G	6'3''	185	Sophomore	Oakland, CA	Transferred to Texas
Harry Wessels	1	C	7'1"	280	Senior	Boddington, Australia	Out of eligibility
Tony Duckett	2	G	6'5"	185	Sophomore	Carlsbad, CA	Departed program
Dillan Shaw	11	G/F	6'7"	205	Freshman	Northridge, CA	Transferred to Arizona State
Oilver Faubert	14	F	6'8"	220	(redshirt) Freshman	Fort Erie, ON, Canada	Transferred to Maine
Cade Bennett	22	G	6'0"	175	(redshirt) Junior	Moraga, CA	Departed program
Paulius Murauskas	23	F	6'8"	235	Junior	Kaunas, Lithuania	Transferred to Arizona State
Liam Campbell	33	G	6'4"	205	(redshirt) Freshman	Meridian, ID	Transferred to High Point
Andrew McKeever	45	C	7'1"	275	Sophomore	Livermore, CA	Transferred to Iowa

=== Incoming transfers ===
Saint Mary's Gaels incoming transfers
Name	Number	Pos.	Height	Weight	Year	Hometown	Previous School
Jeremy Dent-Smith	2	G	6'1''	175	Graduate	Hawthorne, CA	Stanford
Luke Fennell	9	G	6'6"	190	Sophomore	Melbourne, Australia	Syracuse
Salih Altuntas	11	C	6'11"	275	Sophomore	Istanbul, Turkey	Miami (FL)
Thomas Ndong	18	F	6'10''	245	Senior	Montreal, QC, Canada	California Baptist
Jalen Lewis	25	F	6'9"	245	Junior	Oakland, CA	Wisconsin Herd
Vangelis Zougris	35	F	6'8"	245	Senior	Athens, Greece	Louisville

=== 2026 recruiting class ===
College recruiting
Name	Hometown	School	Height	Weight	Commit date
Darius Bivins; PG	Washington, DC	Bishop O'Connell HS	6 ft 0 in (1.83 m)	165 lb (75 kg)	May 11, 2026
Darius Bivins; PG	Recruit ratings: 247Sports: On3: ESPN: (87)				
Sam Curvy; SF	Portland, OR	Jesuit HS	6 ft 4 in (1.93 m)	N/A	May 13, 2026
Sam Curvy; SF	Recruit ratings: (NR)				
Cooper Lewis; SG	Lehi, UT	Lehi HS	6 ft 2 in (1.88 m)	N/A	May 9, 2024
Cooper Lewis; SG	Recruit ratings: (NR)				
Flynn Pavely; C	French's Forest, Australia	BA Centre of Excellence	7 ft 0 in (2.13 m)	250 lb (110 kg)	Nov 12, 2025
Flynn Pavely; C	Recruit ratings: (NR)				
Overall recruit ranking: Scout: – Rivals: –
Note: In many cases, Scout, Rivals, 247Sports, On3, and ESPN may conflict in their listings of height and weight.; In these cases, the average was taken. ESPN grades are on a 100-point scale.; Sources: "2026 Saint Mary's Basketball Recruiting Commits". Scout.; "Scout.com Team Recruiting Rankings". Scout.; "2026 Team Ranking". Rivals.

== Roster ==
2026–27 Saint Mary's Gaels men's basketball team
Players
Coaches

Pos.	#	Name	Height	Weight	Year	Previous school	Hometown
G/F	0	Mantas Juzėnas	6 ft 6 in (1.98 m)	245 lb (111 kg)	So	BC Žalgiris	Kaunas, Lithuania
G	1	Darius Bivins	6 ft 0 in (1.83 m)	205 lb (93 kg)	Fr	Bishop O'Connell HS	Washington, District of Columbia
G	2	Jeremy Dent-Smith	6 ft 1 in (1.85 m)	175 lb (79 kg)	GS	Stanford	Hawthorne, California
G	3	Sam Curvy	6 ft 5 in (1.96 m)	190 lb (86 kg)	Fr	Jesuit HS	Portland, Oregon
C	5	Flynn Pavely	7 ft 0 in (2.13 m)	250 lb (113 kg)	Fr	BA Centre of Excellence	Frenchs Forest, Australia
G	7	Joshua Dent	6 ft 3 in (1.91 m)	190 lb (86 kg)	Jr	BA Centre of Excellence	Wollongong, Australia
G	8	Rory Hawke	6 ft 5 in (1.96 m)	200 lb (91 kg)	RS So	BA Centre of Excellence	Townsville, Australia
G	9	Luke Fennell	6 ft 6 in (1.98 m)	190 lb (86 kg)	So	Syracuse	Melbourne, Australia
C	11	Salih Altuntas	6 ft 11 in (2.11 m)	275 lb (125 kg)	So	Miami (FL)	Istanbul, Turkey
F	18	Thomas Ndong	6 ft 10 in (2.08 m)	245 lb (111 kg)	Sr	California Baptist	Montreal, QC, Canada
G	20	Cooper Lewis	6 ft 3 in (1.91 m)	195 lb (88 kg)	Fr	Lehi HS	Lehi, Utah
F	24	Kevin Gad	6 ft 6 in (1.98 m)	205 lb (93 kg)	RS Sr	Granada HS	Livermore, California
F	25	Jalen Lewis	6 ft 9 in (2.06 m)	245 lb (111 kg)	Jr	Wisconsin Herd	Oakland, California
F/C	32	Jazz Gardner	7 ft 0 in (2.13 m)	250 lb (113 kg)	RS Jr	Pacific	Pasadena, California
F	35	Vangelis Zougris	6 ft 8 in (2.03 m)	245 lb (111 kg)	Sr	Louisville	Athens, Greece
F	42	Trent MacLean	6 ft 10 in (2.08 m)	205 lb (93 kg)	RS Fr	SoCal Academy	Thousand Oaks, California

Head coach

- Mickey McConnell (Saint Mary's)

Assistant coach(es)

- Hardy Asprilla (Cal State Fullerton)
- Chris Cobb (Menlo)
- Rob Jones (Saint Mary's)
- Dan Sheets (Saint Mary's)
- Trey Touchet (McNeese State)

Legend

- (C) Team captain
- (S) Suspended
- (I) Ineligible
- (W) Walk-on
- Injured
- Current redshirt

Roster

== Schedule and results ==
Date time, TV	Rank^{#}	Opponent^{#}	Result	Record	High points	High rebounds	High assists	Site (attendance) city, state
Exhibition
October 17, 2026*; 7:00 p.m.		Utah State	L 89–97	–	24 – Juzėnas	14 – Zougris	6 – Dent	University Credit Union Pavilion (–); Moraga, CA
Non-conference regular season
November 2, 2026*; 7:00 p.m., ESPN+		Illinois State	W 90–85 ^{OT}	1–0	20 – Juzėnas	11 – Juzėnas	4 – Dent-Smith	University Credit Union Pavilion (2,788); Moraga, CA
November 4, 2026*; 7:00 p.m., ESPN+		North Dakota State	W 105–64	2–0	17 – Dent	11 – Juzėnas	7 – Juzėnas	University Credit Union Pavilion (2,701); Moraga, CA
November 8, 2026*; 1:30 p.m.		vs. Nevada; Lake Tahoe Classic	L 95–96	2–1	30 – Dent	8 – Juzėnas	5 – Dent	Tahoe Blue Event Center (3,323); Stateline, NV
November 13, 2026*; 7:00 p.m., ESPN+		UIC	W 84–61	3–1	20 – Bivins	10 – Juzenas	10 – Dent	University Credit Union Pavilion (3,076); Moraga, CA
November 16, 2026*; 7:00 p.m., ESPN+		Portland State	W 94–78	4–1	32 – Juzenas	8 – Juzenas	7 – Dent	University Credit Union Pavilion (2,716); Moraga, CA
November 20, 2026*; 8:00 p.m., ESPN+		Saint Louis	W 95–78	5–1	25 – Juzenas	10 – Juzenas	4 – Tied	University Credit Union Pavilion (3,409); Moraga, CA
November 22, 2026*; 5:00 p.m., ESPN+		Menlo						University Credit Union Pavilion; Moraga, CA
November 26, 2026*; 2:00 p.m., FS1		vs. UCLA; Rady Children's Invitational Semifinal						Jenny Craig Pavilion; San Diego, CA
November 27, 2026*; TBD, FOX		vs. Georgetown/Texas; Rady Children's Invitational						Jenny Craig Pavilion; San Diego, CA
December 1, 2026*; 6:30 p.m., ESPN+		Hofstra						University Credit Union Pavilion; Moraga, CA
December 5, 2026*; 12:15 p.m., ESPN+		at Oklahoma State						Gallagher-Iba Arena; Stillwater, OK
December 9, 2026*; 7:00 p.m., ESPN+		New Mexico State						University Credit Union Pavilion; Moraga, CA
December 12, 2026*; 3:30 p.m., CBSSN		at New Mexico						The Pit; Albuquerque, NM
December 18, 2026*; 7:00 p.m., ESPN+		Iona						University Credit Union Pavilion; Moraga, CA
December 22, 2026*; 6:00 p.m., ESPN+		Harvard						University Credit Union Pavilion; Moraga, CA
December 29, 2026*; 7:00 p.m., ESPN+		Princeton						University Credit Union Pavilion; Moraga, CA
WCC regular season
January 2, 2027; 7:00 p.m., CBSSN		San Diego						University Credit Union Pavilion; Moraga, CA
January 6, 2027; TBD, ESPN+		at Denver						Hamilton Gymnasium; Denver, CO
January 13, 2027; 7:00 p.m., ESPN+		Portland						University Credit Union Pavilion; Moraga, CA
January 16, 2027; TBD, ESPN+		at Pepperdine						The Mountain at Mullin Park; Malibu, CA
January 20, 2027; 8:00 p.m., CBSSN		Pacific						University Credit Union Pavilion; Moraga, CA
January 23, 2027; 7:00 p.m., ESPN+		Loyola Marymount						University Credit Union Pavilion; Moraga, CA
January 27, 2027; 5:00 p.m., ESPN2/U		at San Francisco						Sobrato Center; San Francisco, CA
January 30, 2027; 8:00 p.m., ESPN2		Santa Clara						University Credit Union Pavilion; Moraga, CA
February 3, 2027; 8:00 p.m., CBSSN		at Portland						Chiles Center; Portland, OR
February 6, 2027; 8:30 p.m., ESPN2		at Seattle						Climate Pledge Arena; Seattle, WA
February 9, 2027; 8:00 p.m., ESPN2		San Francisco						University Credit Union Pavilion; Moraga, CA
February 13, 2027; 7:30 p.m., CBSSN		at Loyola Marymount						Gersten Pavilion; Los Angeles, CA
February 18, 2027; 7:30 p.m., CBSSN		at Pacific						Alex G. Spanos Center; Stockton, CA
February 21, 2027; 5:00 p.m., ESPN+		Pepperdine						University Credit Union Pavilion; Moraga, CA
February 24, 2027; 7:00 p.m., ESPN+		Seattle						University Credit Union Pavilion; Moraga, CA
February 27, 2027; 7:00 p.m., ESPN2		at Santa Clara						Leavey Center; Santa Clara, CA
WCC tournament
March 5, 2027; TBD, TBD		vs. TBD						Orleans Arena; Paradise, NV
*Non-conference game. ^{#}Rankings from AP Poll. (#) Tournament seedings in parentheses. All times are in Pacific Time.
