= H.N. and Frances C. Berger Foundation =

American nonprofit organization in California

The H.N. and Frances C. Berger Foundation is a 501(c)(3) nonprofit organization that seeks to assist other nonprofit organizations with financial and/or real estate support, often in the form of grants. Based in Palm Desert, California, the Foundation primarily supports other organizations in Riverside County, California's Coachella Valley.

The Foundation was founded in 1961 by the Bergers with the mission to "help people help themselves." The Foundation states that it is particularly interested in assisting other organizations involved in education, health, and social services.
