= JR Blount =

American college basketball coach

Current position
- Title: Head coach
- Team: San Diego
- Conference: WCC
- Record: 6–1 (.857)

Biographical details
- Born: July 6, 1987 (age 39); Milwaukee, Wisconsin, U.S.
- Education: Loyola University Chicago

Playing career
- 2005–2009: Loyola (IL)
- 2010–2011: Leicester Riders
- Position: Point guard

Coaching career (HC unless noted)
- 2009–2010: Wisconsin–Stevens Point (assistant)
- 2011–2013: Saint Leo (assistant)
- 2013–2014: Saint Leo (associate HC)
- 2016–2018: Drake (assistant)
- 2018–2021: Colorado State (assistant)
- 2021–2026: Iowa State (assistant)
- 2026–present: San Diego

Administrative career (AD unless noted)
- 2014–2016: Drake (DBO)

Head coaching record
- Overall: 6–1 (.857)

Walter Blount Jr. (born July 6, 1987) is an American college basketball coach who is currently the head coach for the San Diego Toreros.

== High school career ==
Blount attended Dominican High School in Whitefish Bay, Wisconsin, where he played high school basketball.

== College career ==
From 2005 to 2009, Blount played college basketball for the Loyola Ramblers. He played in 119 games with 117 starts, averaging 13.5 points, 3.7 rebounds, 2.6 assists, and 1.1 steals per game. Blount was a three-time captain and the team’s most valuable player twice.

== Coaching career ==
On March 10, 2026, Blount was hired to be the next head men's basketball coach for the University of San Diego, replacing Steve Lavin. Prior to accepting the San Diego position, Blount had served as an assistant coach for several seasons at Drake University, Colorado State University, and Iowa State University.

== Head coaching record ==
Record table
Season	Team	Overall	Conference	Standing	Postseason
San Diego Toreros (West Coast Conference) (2026–present)
2026–27	San Diego	6–1	0–0		
San Diego:		6–1 (.857)	0–0 (–)		
Total:		6–1 (.857)			
National champion Postseason invitational champion Conference regular season champion Conference regular season and conference tournament champion Division regular season champion Division regular season and conference tournament champion Conference tournament champion
