= Acrisure Arena =

Indoor arena near Palm Desert, California

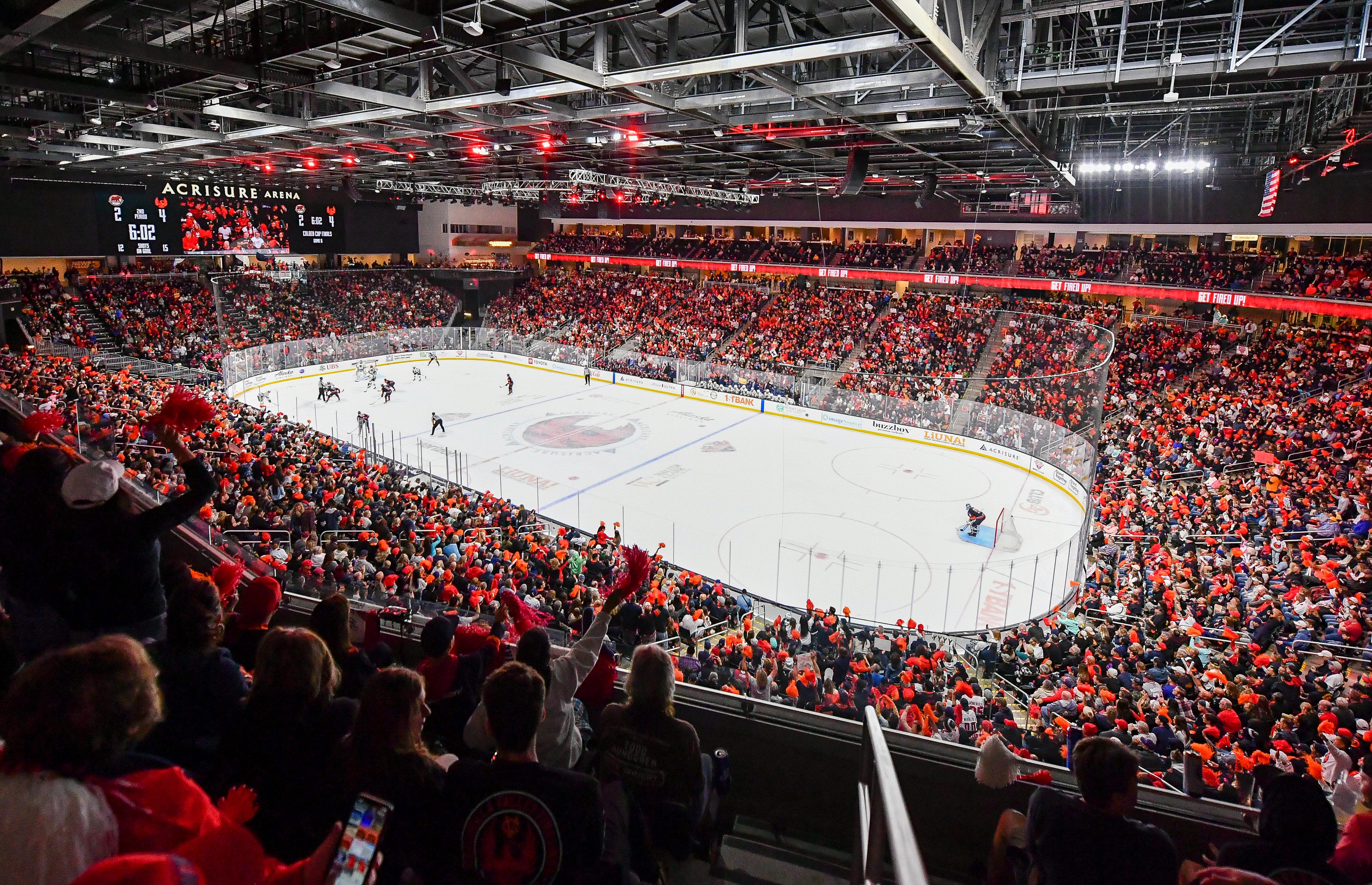
- Interior of the arena during the 2023 Calder Cup Finals
- Former names: Coachella Valley Arena (planning/construction); New Arena at Agua Caliente (planning/construction); Riverside County Arena (planning/construction)
- Address: 75702 Varner Road
- Location: Thousand Palms, California, United States
- Coordinates: 33°46′45″N 116°20′20″W
- Owner: Oak View Group
- Operator: Oak View Group
- Capacity: 11,000
- Executive suites: 20

Construction
- Groundbreaking: June 2, 2021
- Opened: December 14, 2022
- Cost: $290 million
- Architect: Populous
- Builder: AECOM Hunt
- Project manager: CAA Icon
- Structural engineer: Walter P Moore
- General contractor: AECOM Hunt

Tenants
- Coachella Valley Firebirds (AHL) (2022–present); Coachella Valley Lakers (NBA G League) (2026–present)

Website
- acrisurearena.com

Acrisure Arena is a multi-purpose indoor arena in unincorporated Thousand Palms, California in Riverside County, California, United States. The arena opened in December 2022 on 43.35 acres (17.54 ha) of land in the Coachella Valley between Interstate 10 and the Classic Club golf course. It is the home arena for the American Hockey League's Coachella Valley Firebirds and the NBA G League's Coachella Valley Lakers, and is a primary venue for events in the Greater Palm Springs area. The venue's namesake is the eponoymous financial technology and insurance company Acrisure, which purchased the naming rights for an undisclosed amount over a 10-year lease.

== History ==
On June 26, 2019, it was reported that the ownership of the upcoming Seattle Kraken had chosen Palm Springs as the site for Seattle's AHL affiliate and that the Agua Caliente Band of Cahuilla Indians and Oak View Group (OVG) had teamed up to build an arena on band-owned land as a home for their proposed expansion team. The 10,000-seat arena was estimated to cost $250 million. OVG CEO Tim Leiweke relied upon a feasibility study on the future of sports events and tourism in the Coachella Valley, independently authored by Coachella Sports & Entertainment Stadium Authority and the non-profit SoCal Coyotes Sports Leadership Organization, as proof of the viability for a multi-purpose venue in Palm Springs. The proposed arena was to be constructed on part of the Spa Resort Casino's parking lots now Agua Caliente Casino Palm Springs and be owned by the Agua Caliente Band of Cahuilla Indians with the Oak View Group as the arena operator. It would also have had an adjoining facility to serve as a year-round community gathering space as well as the training center for the AHL team. Groundbreaking and construction on the arena was expected to begin in February 2020, with completion by fall 2021, but was put on hold due to the COVID-19 pandemic and the resulting ban on large gatherings including concerts and sporting events. By September 2020, OVG's negotiations with the tribe had come to a halt and the agreement was ended due to financial impacts on the tribe during the COVID-19 pandemic.

On September 16, 2020, the Oak View Group and H.N. and Frances C. Berger Foundation announced they had chosen a new location for the arena in the middle of the Coachella Valley in unincorporated Thousand Palms, California, but it would not open until at least 2022. The arena operator will lease land owned by the Foundation between Interstate 10 and the Foundation's Classic Club golf course. Groundbreaking on the project took place on June 2, 2021.

The arena opened for its first event—a comedy show featuring Chris Rock and Dave Chappelle—on December 14, 2022. The first hockey game at Acrisure Arena was played four days later, with the Firebirds defeating the Tucson Roadrunners 4–3 with a sellout crowd of 10,087 in attendance. According to OVG president Tim Leiweke, the arena's location between Los Angeles, Las Vegas, and Phoenix is advantageous for touring bands as a "working vacation" spot with rehearsal space.

The Firebirds hosted four games of the 2023 Calder Cup Finals at Acrisure Arena and established an American Hockey League record for total playoff attendance with 138,053 fans attending 16 postseason games.

On February 23, 2024, the venue served as the opening venue for Olivia Rodrigo's Guts World Tour, her first arena tour. The show also served as the first arena show for opening act Chappell Roan.

The Los Angeles Lakers faced the Minnesota Timberwolves in an NBA preseason game at Acrisure Arena on October 4, 2024. The Lakers played the Phoenix Suns in another NBA preseason game at Acrisure Arena two days later on October 6, 2024.

On April 30, 2026, the Lakers announced that the franchise would relocate its G League team to the Coachella Valley and play home games at Acrisure Arena.
