= 2026–27 Boise State Broncos men's basketball team =

American college basketball season

2026–27 Boise State Broncos men's basketball
- Conference: Pac-12 Conference
- Record: 3–1 (0–0 Pac-12)
- Head coach: Leon Rice (17th season)
- Associate head coach: Mike Burns (2nd, 11th season overall); Will Voigt (1st season)
- Assistant coaches: Roberto Bergersen (9th season); Matt Charles (4th season); Max Rice (1st season)
- Home arena: ExtraMile Arena (Capacity: 12,644)

2026–27 Pac-12 Conference men's basketball standings
	Conf.				Overall
Team	W		L	PCT	W		L	PCT
Texas State	0	–	0	–	5	–	0	1.000
Oregon State	0	–	0	–	4	–	0	1.000
San Diego State	0	–	0	–	4	–	0	1.000
Utah State	0	–	0	–	4	–	0	1.000
Colorado State	0	–	0	–	3	–	0	1.000
No. 14 Gonzaga	0	–	0	–	2	–	0	1.000
Boise State	0	–	0	–	3	–	1	.750
Fresno State	0	–	0	–	2	–	1	.667
Washington State	0	–	0	–	0	–	3	.000
† 2027 Pac-12 Tournament winner As of November 16, 2026; Rankings from AP poll

The 2026–27 Boise State Broncos men's basketball team will represent Boise State University during the 2026–27 NCAA Division I men's basketball season. The Broncos will be led by seventeenth-year head coach Leon Rice and will play their home games at the ExtraMile Arena in Boise, Idaho as a member of the Pac-12 Conference. This will mark Boise State's first season as members of the Pac-12 Conference after spending the previous fifteen seasons as members of the Mountain West Conference.

== Previous season ==
Boise State finished the 2025-26 season 20–12, 12–8 in the Mountain West Conference to finish tied for fifth in the conference. As the 6-seed in the Mountain West Tournament the Broncos were defeated 74–84 by 11-seed San Jose State in the First round to end their season.

== Offseason ==
=== Departures ===
Boise State Broncos departures
Name	Number	Pos.	Height	Weight	Year	Hometown	Reason for departure
Dylan Andrews	4	G	6'3"	180	Senior	Gardena, CA	Out of eligibility
RJ Keene II	5	G	6'7"	212	(redshirt) Senior	The Woodlands, TX	Transferred to NC State
Dominic Parolin	9	F	6'9"	245	Senior	Coquitlam, BC, Canada	Out of eligibility
Andrew Meadow	13	F	6'7"	218	Junior	Santa Clarita, CA	Transferred to Oregon
Drew Fielder	20	F/C	6'11"	225	Junior	Boise, ID	Transferred to Alabama
Javan Buchanan	22	F	6'7"	230	Senior	Lafayette, IN	Transferred to West Virginia
Noah Bendinger	23	G	6'4"	170	Freshman	Draper, UT	Transferred to Montana

=== Incoming transfers ===
Boise State Broncos incoming transfers
Name	Number	Pos.	Height	Weight	Year	Hometown	Previous School
Jerquarius Stanback	7	F	6'8"	215	Junior	Asheville, NC	Alabama State
Lamar Washington	8	G	6'4"	200	Graduate	Portland, OR	Georgia Tech
Damari Wheeler-Thomas	10	G	6'0"	190	Graduate	Elgin, IL	North Dakota State
Dovydas Butka	13	F	6'9"	225	Graduate	Panevėžys, Lithuania	Campbell
Ty Rodgers	20	G	6'6"	205	Graduate	Saginaw, MI	Illinois
Jikany Deang	35	F	6'9"	245	Junior	St. Cloud, MN	NDSCS

=== 2026 recruiting class ===
College recruiting
Name	Hometown	School	Height	Weight	Commit date
Brady Hennig; SG/SF	Snoqualmie, WA	Mount Si HS	6 ft 6 in (1.98 m)	180 lb (82 kg)	Nov 6, 2024
Brady Hennig; SG/SF	Recruit ratings: Rivals: 247Sports: ESPN: (NR)				
Kaur Tomann; SF	Brookville, NY	Long Island Lutheran HS	6 ft 9 in (2.06 m)	250 lb (110 kg)	May 6, 2026
Kaur Tomann; SF	Recruit ratings: Rivals: 247Sports: ESPN: (NR)				
Overall recruit ranking: Scout: – Rivals: –
Note: In many cases, Scout, Rivals, 247Sports, On3, and ESPN may conflict in their listings of height and weight.; In these cases, the average was taken. ESPN grades are on a 100-point scale.; Sources: "2026 Boise State Basketball Recruiting Commits". Scout.; "Scout.com Team Recruiting Rankings". Scout.; "2026 Team Ranking". Rivals.

== Roster ==
2026–27 Boise State Broncos men's basketball team
Players
Coaches

Pos.	#	Name	Height	Weight	Year	Previous school	Hometown
G	0	Julian Bowie	6 ft 3 in (1.91 m)	205 lb (93 kg)	Jr	Pocatello HS	Pocatello, Idaho
G	1	Aginaldo Neto	6 ft 2 in (1.88 m)	190 lb (86 kg)	So	Bella Vista College Prep	Luanda, Angola
F	3	Bhan Buom	6 ft 8 in (2.03 m)	190 lb (86 kg)	So	Link Year Academy	Lincoln, Nebraska
G	5	Brady Hennig	6 ft 7 in (2.01 m)	195 lb (88 kg)	Fr	Mount Si HS	Snoqualmie, Washington
F	6	Pearson Carmichael	6 ft 7 in (2.01 m)	215 lb (98 kg)	Jr	Summit HS	Bend, Oregon
F	7	Jerquarius Stanback	6 ft 8 in (2.03 m)	215 lb (98 kg)	Jr	Alabama State	Asheville, North Carolina
G	8	Lamar Washington	6 ft 4 in (1.93 m)	200 lb (91 kg)	GS	Georgia Tech	Portland, Oregon
G	10	Damari Wheeler-Thomas	6 ft 0 in (1.83 m)	190 lb (86 kg)	GS	North Dakota State	Elgin, Illinois
G	11	Rayzhon Bergersen	6 ft 2 in (1.88 m)	175 lb (79 kg)	GS	Northwest Nazarene	Boise, Idaho
F	13	Dovydas Butka	6 ft 9 in (2.06 m)	225 lb (102 kg)	GS	Campbell	Panevėžys, Lithuania
F	16	Spencer Ahrens	6 ft 10 in (2.08 m)	230 lb (104 kg)	So	Bella Vista College Prep	Oakville, Ontario, Canada
F	17	Kaur Tomann	6 ft 9 in (2.06 m)	250 lb (113 kg)	Fr	Long Island Lutheran HS	Saku Vald, Estonia
G	20	Ty Rodgers	6 ft 6 in (1.98 m)	205 lb (93 kg)	GS	Illinois	Saginaw, Michigan
G	21	Brennan Ramirez	6 ft 2 in (1.88 m)	175 lb (79 kg)	GS	Enterprise HS	Redding, California
F	30	Ethan Lathan	6 ft 10 in (2.08 m)	220 lb (100 kg)	Jr	AZ Compass Prep	Rockford, Illinois
F	35	Jikany Deang	6 ft 9 in (2.06 m)	245 lb (111 kg)	Jr	NDSCS	St. Cloud, Minnesota

Head coach

- Leon Rice (Washington State)

Assistant coach(es)

- Mike Burns (Central Washington)
- Will Voigt (Pomona)
- Roberto Bergersen (Boise State)
- Matt Charles (Oklahoma State)
- Max Rice (Boise State)

Legend

- (C) Team captain
- (S) Suspended
- (I) Ineligible
- (W) Walk-on
- Injured
- Current redshirt

Roster

== Schedule and results ==
Date time, TV	Rank^{#}	Opponent^{#}	Result	Record	High points	High rebounds	High assists	Site (attendance) city, state
Exhibition
October 10, 2026*; 5:00 p.m., KTVB 7.2		vs. Idaho	W 82–72		21 – Bowie	10 – Butka	6 – Neto	Idaho Central Arena (2,104); Boise, ID
October 17, 2026*; 7:00 p.m., TBD		vs. Washington	W 109–91		29 – Neto	11 – Butka	4 – Tied	Idaho Central Arena (2,137); Boise, ID
October 29, 2026*; 7:00 p.m., Pac-12 YouTube		Bismarck State College	W 107–34		14 – Buom	9 – Lathan	7 – Bowie	ExtraMile Arena; Boise, ID
Non-conference regular season
November 4, 2026*; 7:00 p.m., Pac-12 YouTube		West Coast Baptist	W 132–53	1–0	18 – Butka	16 – Stanback	8 – Neto	ExtraMile Arena (7,629); Boise, ID
November 8, 2026*; 12:00 p.m., USA		Butler	W 100–81	2–0	25 – Neto	14 – Butka	6 – Wheeler-Thomas	ExtraMile Arena (8,933); Boise, ID
November 11, 2026*; 7:00 p.m., Pac-12 YouTube		Oakland	W 111–79	3–0	25 – Neto	7 – Butka	6 – Wheeler-Thomas	ExtraMile Arena (8,150); Boise, ID
November 15, 2026*; 11:00 a.m., BTN		vs. No. 25 Nebraska	L 75–102	3–1	17 – Tied	7 – Butka	8 – Wheeler-Thomas	Sanford Pentagon (3,526); Sioux Falls, SD
November 20, 2026*; 7:00 p.m., Pac-12 YouTube		Sam Houston						ExtraMile Arena; Boise, ID
November 24, 2026*; 7:00 p.m., Pac-12 YouTube		Idaho State						ExtraMile Arena; Boise, ID
November 27, 2026*; 3:30 p.m., YouTube		vs. Drake; Snake River Collegiate Basketball Invitational						Mountain America Center; Idaho Falls, ID
November 28, 2026*; 1:30 p.m., USA		vs. North Texas; Snake River Collegiate Basketball Invitational						Mountain America Center; Idaho Falls, ID
November 29, 2026*; 2:00 p.m., The CW		vs. North Dakota State; Snake River Collegiate Basketball Invitational						Mountain America Center; Idaho Falls, ID
December 5, 2026*; 5:00 p.m., ESPN+		at Wichita State						Charles Koch Arena; Wichita, KS
December 12, 2026*; 12:30 p.m., USA		Texas A&M-Corpus Christi						ExtraMile Arena; Boise, ID
December 16, 2026*; 7:00 p.m., Pac-12 YouTube		Utah Valley						ExtraMile Arena; Boise, ID
December 21, 2026*; 3:00 p.m., Pac-12 YouTube		vs. Santa Clara; SoCal Basketball Invitational						The Pavilion at JSerra; San Juan Capistrano, CA
December 23, 2026*; 1:30 p.m., USA		vs. New Mexico; SoCal Basketball Invitational						The Pavilion at JSerra; San Juan Capistrano, CA
December 29, 2026*; 7:00 p.m., Pac-12 YouTube		Lamar						ExtraMile Arena; Boise, ID
Pac-12 regular season
January 6, 2027; 8:00 p.m., CBSSN		at Utah State						Smith Spectrum; Logan, UT
January 9, 2027; 7:00 p.m., The CW		Oregon State						ExtraMile Arena; Boise, ID
January 13, 2027; 7:00 p.m., CBSSN		Washington State						ExtraMile Arena; Boise, ID
January 16, 2027; 8:30 p.m., CBSSN		at Gonzaga						McCarthey Athletic Center; Spokane, WA
January 20, 2027; 7:00 p.m., CBSSN		at Fresno State						Save Mart Center; Fresno, CA
January 23, 2027; 8:00 p.m., CBSSN		San Diego State						ExtraMile Arena; Boise, ID
January 27, 2027; 8:00 p.m., CBSSN		Utah State						ExtraMile Arena; Boise, ID
January 30, 2027; 12:30 p.m., The CW		at Texas State						Strahan Arena; San Marcos, TX
February 4, 2027; 9:00 p.m., USA		at Oregon State						Gill Coliseum; Corvallis, OR
February 10, 2027; 6:00 p.m., The CW		Gonzaga						ExtraMile Arena; Boise, ID
February 13, 2027; 2:00 p.m., USA		Fresno State						ExtraMile Arena; Boise, ID
February 18, 2027; 8:00 p.m., USA		at Colorado State						Moby Arena; Fort Collins, CO
February 20, 2027; 4:30 p.m., USA		Texas State						ExtraMile Arena; Boise, ID
February 25, 2027; TBD, The CW		at Washington State						Beasley Coliseum; Pullman, WA
March 3, 2027; 8:00 p.m., CBSSN		Colorado State						ExtraMile Arena; Boise, ID
March 6, 2027; 8:30 p.m., USA		at San Diego State						Viejas Arena; San Diego, CA
Pac-12 tournament
March, 2027; TBD, TBD		vs. TBD						MGM Grand Garden Arena; Paradise, NV
*Non-conference game. ^{#}Rankings from AP Poll. (#) Tournament seedings in parentheses. All times are in Mountain Time.
