= 2026–27 Colorado State Rams men's basketball team =

American college basketball season

2026–27 Colorado State Rams men's basketball
- Conference: Pac-12 Conference
- Record: 4–1 (0–0 Pac-12)
- Head coach: Ali Farokhmanesh (2nd season)
- Assistant coaches: Cole Gentry (2nd season); Chris Haslam (1st season); Dave Pilipovich (2nd season); Tim Shelton (4th season)
- Home arena: Moby Arena (Capacity: 8,083)

2026–27 Pac-12 Conference men's basketball standings
	Conf.				Overall
Team	W		L	PCT	W		L	PCT
Oregon State	0	–	0	–	6	–	0	1.000
Texas State	0	–	0	–	6	–	0	1.000
San Diego State	0	–	0	–	5	–	0	1.000
Utah State	0	–	0	–	5	–	0	1.000
Colorado State	0	–	0	–	4	–	1	.800
No. 22 Gonzaga	0	–	0	–	3	–	1	.750
Fresno State	0	–	0	–	4	–	2	.667
Boise State	0	–	0	–	3	–	2	.600
Washington State	0	–	0	–	2	–	3	.400
† 2027 Pac-12 Tournament winner As of November 21, 2026; Rankings from AP poll

The 2026–27 Colorado State Rams men's basketball team will represent Colorado State University during the 2026–27 NCAA Division I men's basketball season. The Rams will be led by second-year head coach Ali Farokhmanesh and will play their home games at the Moby Arena in Fort Collins, Colorado as a member of the Pac-12 Conference. This will mark Colorado State's first season as members of the Pac-12 Conference after spending the previous twenty-seven seasons as members of the Mountain West Conference.

== Previous season ==
Colorado State finished the 2025–26 season 21–13, 11–9 in the Mountain West Conference to finish tied for seventh in the conference. As the 7-seed in the Mountain West Tournament the Rams defeated Fresno State in the First round before falling to 2-seed San Diego State in the Quarterfinals 62–71. Colorado State was invited to participate in the NIT as a 3-seed in the Albuquerque Region. The Rams hosted Saint Joseph's in the First round, but were defeated 64–69 to end their season.

== Offseason ==
=== Departures ===
Colorado State Rams departures
Name	Number	Pos.	Height	Weight	Year	Hometown	Reason for departure
Brandon Rechsteiner	2	G	6'1"	190	Junior	Acworth, GA	Transferred to Kansas State
Darnez Slater	3	G	6'3"	175	(redshirt) Freshman	Eastvale, CA	Transferred to Montana State
Jon Mekonnen	5	F	6'8"	195	(redshirt) Freshman	Eagan, MN	Transferred to South Dakota State
Augustinas Kiudulas	11	F	6'8"	215	Junior	Vilnius, Lithuania	Transferred to Western Michigan
Nikola Djapa	23	C	6'11"	235	Sophomore	Belgrade, Serbia	Transferred to Wright State
Jevin Muniz	55	G	6'6"	190	Senior	Bethlehem, PA	Entered transfer portal

=== Incoming transfers ===
Colorado State Rams incoming transfers
Name	Number	Pos.	Height	Weight	Year	Hometown	Previous School
Justin Menard	3	G	6'3"	185	Junior	Higganum, CT	Marist
Amondo Miller Jr.	18	F	6'7"	195	Graduate	Littleton, CO	Lubbock Christian

=== 2026 recruiting class ===
College recruiting
Name	Hometown	School	Height	Weight	Commit date
Jaxon Clark; C	Keokuk, IA	Keokuk HS	6 ft 10 in (2.08 m)	260 lb (120 kg)	May 13, 2026
Jaxon Clark; C	Recruit ratings: Rivals: 247Sports: ESPN: (NR)				
Pops Dunson; PG	Douglasville, GA	Robert S. Alexander HS	6 ft 1 in (1.85 m)	185 lb (84 kg)	Sep 7, 2025
Pops Dunson; PG	Recruit ratings: Rivals: 247Sports: ESPN: (NR)				
Eric Fiedler; PF	Aurora, CO	Regis Jesuit HS	6 ft 8 in (2.03 m)	200 lb (91 kg)	Jul 27, 2025
Eric Fiedler; PF	Recruit ratings: Rivals: 247Sports: ESPN: (NR)				
Jaden Ghoreishi; PF	Mead, WA	Mt. Spokane HS	6 ft 9 in (2.06 m)	215 lb (98 kg)	Sep 9, 2025
Jaden Ghoreishi; PF	Recruit ratings: Rivals: 247Sports: ESPN: (87)				
River Sawyer; SG	Greeley, CO	University HS	6 ft 4 in (1.93 m)	N/A	May 23, 2026
River Sawyer; SG	Recruit ratings: Rivals: 247Sports: ESPN: (NR)				
Overall recruit ranking: Scout: – Rivals: –
Note: In many cases, Scout, Rivals, 247Sports, On3, and ESPN may conflict in their listings of height and weight.; In these cases, the average was taken. ESPN grades are on a 100-point scale.; Sources: "2026 Colorado State Basketball Recruiting Commits". Scout.; "Scout.com Team Recruiting Rankings". Scout.; "2026 Team Ranking". Rivals.

== Roster ==
2026–27 Colorado State Rams men's basketball team
Players
Coaches

Pos.	#	Name	Height	Weight	Year	Previous school	Hometown
F	0	Carey Booth	6 ft 10 in (2.08 m)	215 lb (98 kg)	Sr	Illinois	Englewood, Colorado
G	1	River Sawyer	6 ft 4 in (1.93 m)	—	Fr	University HS	Windsor, Colorado
G	2	Pops Dunson	6 ft 1 in (1.85 m)	185 lb (84 kg)	Fr	Robert S. Alexander HS	Douglasville, Georgia
G	3	Justin Menard	6 ft 3 in (1.91 m)	185 lb (84 kg)	Jr	Marist	Higganum, Connecticut
G	4	Jase Butler	6 ft 4 in (1.93 m)	185 lb (84 kg)	Jr	Washington	San Anselmo, California
G	5	Josh Pascarelli	6 ft 3 in (1.91 m)	195 lb (88 kg)	Sr	Marist	Cambria Heights, New York
F	7	Jaden Ghoreishi	6 ft 9 in (2.06 m)	215 lb (98 kg)	Fr	Mt. Spokane HS	Mead, Washington
G	8	Jojo McIver	6 ft 3 in (1.91 m)	185 lb (84 kg)	So	Ellison HS	Killeen, Texas
F	18	Amondo Miller Jr.	6 ft 7 in (2.01 m)	195 lb (88 kg)	GS	Lubbock Chrisitan	Littleton, Colorado
F	21	Rashaan Mbemba	6 ft 7 in (2.01 m)	250 lb (113 kg)	Sr	Borgi St. Polten	Vienna, Austria
F	30	Charlie Dortch	6 ft 7 in (2.01 m)	235 lb (107 kg)	RS Jr	Fort Lewis	Fort Collins, Colorado
F	35	Kyle Jorgensen	6 ft 9 in (2.06 m)	225 lb (102 kg)	Jr	Washburn HS	Minneapolis, Minnesota
F	41	Docker Tedeschi	6 ft 9 in (2.06 m)	190 lb (86 kg)	RS Fr	Benton Consolidated HS	Benton, Illinois
C	42	Jaxon Clark	6 ft 10 in (2.08 m)	—	Fr	Keokuk HS	Keokuk, Iowa
F	43	Eric Fiedler	6 ft 6 in (1.98 m)	200 lb (91 kg)	Fr	Regis Jesuit HS	Aurora, Colorado

Head coach

- Ali Farokhmanesh (Northern Iowa)

Assistant coach(es)

- Cole Gentry (Wright State)
- Chris Haslam (Wyoming)
- Dave Pilipovich (Thiel)
- Tim Shelton (San Diego State)

Legend

- (C) Team captain
- (S) Suspended
- (I) Ineligible
- (W) Walk-on
- Injured
- Current redshirt

Roster

== Schedule and results ==
Date time, TV	Rank^{#}	Opponent^{#}	Result	Record	High points	High rebounds	High assists	Site (attendance) city, state
Exhibition
October 25, 2026*; 2:00 p.m., TBD		at San Diego	L 58–73		19 – Booth	7 – Tied	4 – Butler	Jenny Craig Pavilion (823); San Diego, CA
Non-conference regular season
November 2, 2026*; 8:00 p.m., Pac-12 YouTube		Montana State	W 84–74	1–0	16 – Booth	11 – Ghoreishi	6 – Butler	Moby Arena (4,479); Fort Collins, CO
November 6, 2026*; 7:00 p.m., Pac-12 YouTube		Idaho	W 78–67	2–0	19 – Tied	10 – Booth	6 – Butler	Moby Arena (4,952); Fort Collins, CO
November 11, 2026*; 7:00 p.m., Pac-12 YouTube		Portland State	W 87-71	3-0	21 – Pascarelli	5 – Mbemba	7 – Butler	Moby Arena (4,168); Fort Collins, CO
November 14, 2026*; 11:30 a.m., USA		Loyola Chicago	L 58–73	3–1	15 – Pascarelli	13 – Booth	4 – Butler	Moby Arena (4,597); Fort Collins, CO
November 18, 2026*; 7:00 p.m., Pac-12 YouTube		North Dakota State	W 71–64	4–1	17 – Jorgensen	11 – Booth	5 – Tied	Moby Arena (4,114); Fort Collins, CO
November 23, 2026*; 9:30 p.m., ESPN2		vs. Arizona; 2026 Maui Invitational First round						Lahaina Civic Center; Lahaina, HI
November 24, 2026*; TBD, TBD		vs. Providence/VCU; 2026 Maui Invitational						Lahaina Civic Center; Lahaina, HI
November 25, 2026*; TBD, TBD		vs. TBD; 2026 Maui Invitational						Lahaina Civic Center; Lahaina, HI
December 1, 2026*; 7:00 p.m., TBD		UT Arlington						Moby Arena; Fort Collins, CO
December 5, 2026*; 8:00 p.m., TNT		at Colorado; Rocky Mountain Showdown						CU Events Center; Boulder, CO
December 8, 2026*; 7:00 p.m., TBD		Queens						Moby Arena; Fort Collins, CO
December 11, 2026*; 6:00 p.m., The CW		Wyoming; Border War						Moby Arena; Fort Collins, CO
December 18, 2026*; 2:30 p.m., TBD		vs. Nevada; Texas Legends College Classic						Comerica Center; Frisco, TX
December 20, 2026*; 4:00 p.m., TBD		vs. Florida Atlantic; Texas Legends College Classic						Comerica Center; Frisco, TX
December 30, 2026*; 6:00 p.m., BTN		at Wisconsin						Kohl Center; Madison, WI
January 2, 2027*; 4:30 p.m., USA		CSU Pueblo						Moby Arena; Fort Collins, CO
Pac-12 regular season
January 6, 2027; TBD, The CW		Texas State						Moby Arena; Fort Collins, CO
January 9, 2027; 4:30 p.m., USA		at Gonzaga						McCarthey Athletic Center; Spokane, WA
January 14, 2027; 7:00 p.m., USA		at San Diego State						Viejas Arena; San Diego, CA
January 17, 2027; 12:00 p.m., USA		Fresno State						Moby Arena; Fort Collins, CO
January 21, 2027; 8:00 p.m., USA		Washington State						Moby Arena; Fort Collins, CO
January 27, 2027; 6:00 p.m., TBD		at Texas State						Strahan Arena; San Marcos, TX
January 30, 2027; 4:30 p.m., USA		San Diego State						Moby Arena; Fort Collins, CO
February 4, 2027; TBD, The CW		at Fresno State						Save Mart Center; Fresno, CA
February 6, 2027; 2:30 p.m., USA		Oregon State						Moby Arena; Fort Collins, CO
February 10, 2027; TBD, USA		at Utah State						Smith Spectrum; Logan, UT
February 13, 2027; 5:45 p.m., The CW		at Washington State						Beasley Coliseum; Pullman, WA
February 18, 2027; 8:00 p.m., USA		Boise State						Moby Arena; Fort Collins, CO
February 25, 2027; 8:00 p.m., USA		Utah State						Moby Arena; Fort Collins, CO
February 27, 2027; 8:15 p.m., The CW		at Oregon State						Gill Coliseum; Corvallis, OR
March 3, 2027; 8:00 p.m., CBSSN		at Boise State						ExtraMile Arena; Boise, ID
March 6, 2027; 6:30 p.m., USA		Gonzaga						Moby Arena; Fort Collins, CO
Pac-12 tournament
March, 2027; TBD, TBD		vs. TBD						MGM Grand Garden Arena; Paradise, NV
*Non-conference game. ^{#}Rankings from AP Poll. (#) Tournament seedings in parentheses. All times are in Mountain Time.
