= 2026–27 Gonzaga Bulldogs men's basketball team =

American college basketball season

2026–27 Gonzaga Bulldogs men's basketball
- Conference: Pac-12 Conference

Ranking
- Coaches: No. 19
- AP: No. 22
- Record: 3–1 (0–0 Pac-12)
- Head coach: Mark Few (28th season)
- Assistant coaches: Brian Michaelson (14th season); Stephen Gentry (6th season); R-Jay Barsh (4th season); Zach Norvell Jr. (4th season); Kurt Bambauer (1st season)
- Home arena: McCarthey Athletic Center (Capacity: 6,000)

2026–27 Pac-12 Conference men's basketball standings
	Conf.				Overall
Team	W		L	PCT	W		L	PCT
Oregon State	0	–	0	–	5	–	0	1.000
Texas State	0	–	0	–	5	–	0	1.000
San Diego State	0	–	0	–	4	–	0	1.000
Utah State	0	–	0	–	4	–	0	1.000
Boise State	0	–	0	–	3	–	1	.750
Colorado State	0	–	0	–	3	–	1	.750
Fresno State	0	–	0	–	3	–	1	.750
No. 22 Gonzaga	0	–	0	–	2	–	1	.667
Washington State	0	–	0	–	1	–	3	.250
† 2027 Pac-12 Tournament winner As of November 18, 2026; Rankings from AP poll

The 2026–27 Gonzaga Bulldogs men's basketball team represents Gonzaga University during the 2026–27 NCAA Division I men's basketball season. The Bulldogs, also unofficially nicknamed the "Zags", are led by Mark Few, in his 38th season at Gonzaga and 28th as head coach, and play their home games at the McCarthey Athletic Center in Spokane, Washington as a member of the Pac-12 Conference. This is Gonzaga's first season as members of the Pac-12 Conference after spending the previous 47 seasons as a member of the West Coast Conference.

== Previous season ==
Gonzaga finished the 2025-26 season 31–4, 16–2 in the West Coast Conference to finish tied for first in the conference. As the top seed in the WCC Tournament they would defeat 4-seed Oregon State in the Semifinal to advance to the Championship against 3-seed Santa Clara. The Zags defeated the Broncos 79–68 to claim the tournament championship. As a result, they received the conference's autobid to the NCAA Tournament as the 3-seed in the West region. Gonzaga defeated 14-seed Kennesaw State in the First round before falling to 11-seed Texas 68–74 in the Second round to end their season.

== Offseason ==
=== Departures ===
Gonzaga Bulldogs departures
Name	Number	Pos.	Height	Weight	Year	Hometown	Reason for departure
Tyon Grant-Foster	7	G	6'7"	215	Graduate	Kansas City, KS	Graduated/undrafted in 2026 NBA draft; signed with the Sioux Falls Skyforce
Steele Venters	2	G	6'7"	200	Graduate	Ellesburg, WA	Transferred to Washington
Graham Ike	15	F	6'9"	250	Gradate	Aurora, CO	Graduated/undrafted in 2026 NBA draft; signed with the Golden State Warriors
Adam Miller	23	G	6'3"	200	Graduate	Peoria, IL	Graduated/undrafted in 2026 NBA draft; signed with BC Oostende
Noah Haaland	35	F	6'9"	245	(redshirt) Senior	Rathdrum, ID	Walk-on; graduated
Jalen Warley	8	G	6'7"	205	Senior	Philadelphia, PA	Graduated
Braeden Smith	3	G	6'0"	170	(redshirt) Junior	Seattle, WA	Transferred to Notre Dame
Emmanuel Innocenti	5	F	6'5"	198	Junior	Petit Badien, Ivory Coast	Transferred to Arizona State
Joaquim ArauzMoore	10	G	6'1"	175	(redshirt) Sophomore	Ross, CA	Walk-on; transferred to High Point
Ismaila Diagne	24	C	7'0"	237	Sophomore	Nguékhokh, Senegal	Transferred to San Francisco
Cade Orness	0	G	6'5"	185	(redshirt) Freshman	Poulsbo, WA	Walk-on; transferred to Mount St. Mary's
Mario Saint-Supéry	17	G	6'3"	199	Freshman	Málaga, Spain	Signed with Valencia Basket

=== Incoming transfers ===
Gonzaga Bulldogs incoming transfers
Name	Number	Pos.	Height	Weight	Year	Hometown	Previous School
Nathan De Sousa	7	G	6'3"	200	Fifth year	Jussy, France	Cholet
Javon Bennett	2	G	5'10"	165	Fifth year	Orlando, FL	Dayton
Chauncey Wiggins	9	F	6'11"	225	Fifth year	Atlanta, GA	Florida State
Xaivian Lee	5	G	6'4"	185	Fifth year	Toronto, ON	Florida
Izan Almansa	13	F	6'10"	220	Junior	Murcia, Spain	Real Madrid
Isiah Harwell	1	G	6'6"	216	Sophomore	Pocatello, ID	Houston
Massamba Diop	35	C	7'1"	245	Sophomore	Rufisque, Senegal	Arizona State

=== Recruiting classes ===
==== 2026 recruiting class ====
College recruiting
Name	Hometown	School	Height	Weight	Commit date
Sam Funches #15 C	Gluckstadt, MS	Germantown	7 ft 0 in (2.13 m)	238 lb (108 kg)	Oct 17, 2025
Sam Funches #15 C	Recruit ratings: Rivals: 247Sports: ESPN: (81)				
Luca Foster #19 SF	Philadelphia, PA	Link Academy	6 ft 5 in (1.96 m)	195 lb (88 kg)	Oct 25, 2025
Luca Foster #19 SF	Recruit ratings: Rivals: 247Sports: ESPN: (87)				
Juwan Ekanga; SG	Aix-les-Bains, France	JL Bourg	6 ft 6 in (1.98 m)	207 lb (94 kg)	Jun 14, 2026
Juwan Ekanga; SG	Recruit ratings: No ratings found				
Overall recruit ranking:
Note: In many cases, Scout, Rivals, 247Sports, On3, and ESPN may conflict in their listings of height and weight.; In these cases, the average was taken. ESPN grades are on a 100-point scale.; Sources: "Gonzaga 2026 Basketball Commitments". Rivals.; "2026 Gonzaga Bulldogs Recruiting Class". ESPN.; "2026 Team Ranking". Rivals.

==== 2027 recruiting class ====
College recruiting (2027)
Name	Hometown	School	Height	Weight	Commit date
Dooney Johnson #7 PG	Milwaukee, WI	East River	6 ft 6 in (1.98 m)	185 lb (84 kg)	Oct 29, 2025
Dooney Johnson #7 PG	Recruit ratings: Rivals: 247Sports: ESPN: (90)				
Overall recruit ranking:
Note: In many cases, Scout, Rivals, 247Sports, On3, and ESPN may conflict in their listings of height and weight.; In these cases, the average was taken. ESPN grades are on a 100-point scale.; Sources: "Gonzaga 2027 Basketball Commitments". Rivals.; "2027 Gonzaga Bulldogs Recruiting Class". ESPN.; "2027 Team Ranking". Rivals.

== Roster ==
2026–27 Gonzaga Bulldogs men's basketball team
Players
Coaches

Pos.	#	Name	Height	Weight	Year	Previous school	Hometown
F	34	Braden Huff	6 ft 10 in (2.08 m)	250 lb (113 kg)	GS	Glenbard West	Glen Ellyn, IL
G	7	Nathan De Sousa	6 ft 3 in (1.91 m)	200 lb (91 kg)	GS	Cholet	Jussy, France
G	2	Javon Bennett	5 ft 10 in (1.78 m)	165 lb (75 kg)	GS	Dayton	Orlando, FL
F	9	Chauncey Wiggins	6 ft 11 in (2.11 m)	225 lb (102 kg)	GS	Florida State	Atlanta, GA
G	5	Xaivian Lee	6 ft 4 in (1.93 m)	185 lb (84 kg)	GS	Florida	Toronto, ON
F	13	Izan Almansa	6 ft 10 in (2.08 m)	220 lb (100 kg)	Jr	Real Madrid	Murcia, Spain
G	4	Davis Fogle	6 ft 7 in (2.01 m)	200 lb (91 kg)	So	AZ Compass Prep	Anacortes, WA
F	32	Parker Jefferson	6 ft 9 in (2.06 m)	240 lb (109 kg)	So	Inglewood	Waxahachie, TX
G	14	Alonzo Metz (W)	5 ft 11 in (1.8 m)	165 lb (75 kg)	So	Riviera Prep	Portland, OR
G	1	Isiah Harwell	6 ft 6 in (1.98 m)	216 lb (98 kg)	So	Houston	Pocatello, ID
C	35	Massamba Diop	7 ft 1 in (2.16 m)	245 lb (111 kg)	So	Arizona State	Rufisque, Senegal
F	33	Sam Funches	7 ft 0 in (2.13 m)	238 lb (108 kg)	Fr	Germantown	Gluckstadt, MS
F	0	Luca Foster	6 ft 5 in (1.96 m)	195 lb (88 kg)	Fr	Link Academy	Philadelphia, PA
G	30	Carter Nilson (W)	6 ft 5 in (1.96 m)	185 lb (84 kg)	Fr	Gonzaga Prep	Spokane, WA
G	3	Juwan Ekanga	6 ft 6 in (1.98 m)	207 lb (94 kg)	Fr	JL Bourg	Aix-les-Bains, France

Head coach

- Mark Few (Oregon)

Assistant coach(es)

- Brian Michaelson (Gonzaga)
- Stephen Gentry (Gonzaga)
- R-Jay Barsh (Puget Sound)
- Zach Norvell Jr. (Gonzaga)
- Kurt Bambauer (Gonzaga)

Legend

- (C) Team captain
- (S) Suspended
- (I) Ineligible
- (W) Walk-on
- Injured
- Current redshirt

Roster
Last update: 2026-11-12

- Roster is subject to change as/if players transfer or leave the program for other reasons.

== Schedule and results ==
Date time, TV	Rank^{#}	Opponent^{#}	Result	Record	High points	High rebounds	High assists	Site (attendance) city, state
Exhibition
October 24, 2026*; 1:00 p.m., SECN+	No. 15	at No. 12 Arkansas	L 72–76		19 – Huff	11 – Huff	3 – Tied	Bud Walton Arena (16,436); Fayetteville, AR
October 28, 2026*; 6:00 p.m., KHQ	No. 15	Lewis–Clark State	W 91–59		12 – Tied	6 – Jefferson	5 – Lee	McCarthey Athletic Center (6,000); Spokane, WA
Regular season
November 2, 2026*; 4:30 p.m., TNT/HBO Max	No. 15	vs. Purdue; Hall of Fame Series − Las Vegas	W 78–72	1–0	22 – Fogle	7 – Huff	4 – De Sousa	T-Mobile Arena; Paradise, NV
November 7, 2026*; 2:00 p.m., The CW/KHQ	No. 15	New Mexico State	W 109–68	2–0	22 – Tied	7 – Diop	10 – Lee	McCarthey Athletic Center (6,000); Spokane, WA
November 14, 2026*; 12:30 p.m., USA	No. 14	vs. LSU; Bad Boy Mowers Series − Spokane	L 80–81	2–1	18 – Huff	13 – Huff	6 – Fogle	Numerica Veterans Arena (12,000); Spokane, WA
November 17, 2026*; 8:00 p.m., CBSSN	No. 22	Montana State	W 74–62	3–1	21 – Huff	9 – Tied	6 – Lee	McCarthey Athletic Center (6,000); Spokane, WA
November 24, 2026*; 9:30 p.m., ESPN		vs. Kansas State; Players Era 16 Bracket 2 First round						T-Mobile Arena; Paradise, NV
November 26, 2026*; TBD, ESPN		vs. Alabama/Baylor; Players Era 16 Bracket 2						T-Mobile Arena; Paradise, NV
November 27, 2026*; TBD, ESPN		vs. TBD; Players Era 16 Bracket 2						T-Mobile Arena; Paradise, NV
December 2, 2026*; 7:00 p.m., CBSSN		Eastern Oregon						McCarthey Athletic Center; Spokane, WA
December 5, 2026*; 8:30 p.m., FOX		vs. UCLA; Acura West Coast Hoops Showdown						Honda Center; Anaheim, CA
December 9, 2026*; 6:00 p.m., The CW		Incarnate Word						McCarthey Athletic Center; Spokane, WA
December 12, 2026*; 7:00 p.m., FOX		at Creighton						CHI Health Center Omaha; Omaha, NE
December 19, 2026*; 2:00 p.m., CBS		vs. Michigan State; Acrisure Series						Acrisure Arena; Thousand Palms, CA
December 31, 2026*; 5:00 p.m., The CW		Cornell						McCarthey Athletic Center; Spokane, WA
January 6, 2027; 6:00 p.m., The CW		at Washington State; Rivalry						Beasley Coliseum; Pullman, WA
January 9, 2027; 3:30 p.m., USA		Colorado State						McCarthey Athletic Center; Spokane, WA
January 13, 2027; 8:00 p.m., CBSSN		at Fresno State						Save Mart Center; Fresno, CA
January 16, 2027; 7:30 p.m., CBSSN		Boise State						McCarthey Athletic Center; Spokane, WA
January 21, 2027; 5:00 p.m., USA		at Utah State						Smith Spectrum; Logan, UT
January 24, 2027; 11:00 a.m./1:00 p.m., USA		at Oregon State						Gill Coliseum; Corvallis, OR
January 27, 2027; 7:00 p.m., USA		Fresno State						McCarthey Athletic Center; Spokane, WA
January 30, 2027*; 11:00 a.m., CBS		vs. Oregon; Battle in Seattle						Climate Pledge Arena; Seattle, WA
February 4, 2027; 7:00 p.m., CBSSN		Texas State						McCarthey Athletic Center; Spokane, WA
February 6, 2027; 3:30 p.m., USA		at San Diego State						Viejas Arena; San Diego, CA
February 10, 2027; 5:00 p.m., The CW		at Boise State						ExtraMile Arena; Boise, ID
February 13, 2027; 5:00 p.m., USA		Utah State						McCarthey Athletic Center; Spokane, WA
February 17, 2027; 7:00 p.m., CBSSN		Washington State; Rivalry						McCarthey Athletic Center; Spokane, WA
February 20, 2027*; 5:00 p.m., Prime Video		vs. Duke; Prime College Hoops Showcase						Little Caesars Arena; Detroit, MI
February 25, 2027; 5:00 p.m., USA		at Texas State						Strahan Arena; San Marcos, TX
February 27, 2027; 1:00 p.m., CBS		San Diego State						McCarthey Athletic Center; Spokane, WA
March 3, 2027; 6:00 p.m., The CW		Oregon State						McCarthey Athletic Center; Spokane, WA
March 6, 2027; 5:30 p.m., USA		at Colorado State						Moby Arena; Fort Collins, CO
Pac-12 tournament
March 9-13, 2027; TBD, TBD		vs. TBD						MGM Grand Garden Arena; Paradise, NV
*Non-conference game. ^{#}Rankings from AP Poll. (#) Tournament seedings in parentheses. All times are in Pacific Time.

== Rankings ==
Ranking movements Legend: ██ Increase in ranking ██ Decrease in ranking
	Week																				
Poll	Pre	1	2	3	4	5	6	7	8	9	10	11	12	13	14	15	16	17	18	19	Final
AP	15	14	22																		
Coaches	12	12	19																		

== See also ==
- 2026–27 Gonzaga Bulldogs women's basketball team
