= 2026–27 Utah State Aggies men's basketball team =

American college basketball season

2026–27 Utah State Aggies men's basketball
- Conference: Pac-12 Conference
- Record: 5–0 (0–0 Pac-12)
- Head coach: Ben Jacobson (1st season)
- Assistant coaches: PJ Hogan (1st season); Gameli Ahelegbe (1st season); Barret Peery (1st season); Geoffrey Groselle (1st season); Thomas Kithier (1st season)
- Home arena: Smith Spectrum (Capacity: 10,270)

2026–27 Pac-12 Conference men's basketball standings
	Conf.				Overall
Team	W		L	PCT	W		L	PCT
Oregon State	0	–	0	–	6	–	0	1.000
Texas State	0	–	0	–	6	–	0	1.000
San Diego State	0	–	0	–	5	–	0	1.000
Utah State	0	–	0	–	5	–	0	1.000
Colorado State	0	–	0	–	4	–	1	.800
Boise State	0	–	0	–	3	–	1	.750
No. 22 Gonzaga	0	–	0	–	3	–	1	.750
Fresno State	0	–	0	–	3	–	2	.600
Washington State	0	–	0	–	2	–	3	.400
† 2027 Pac-12 Tournament winner As of November 21, 2026; Rankings from AP poll

The 2026–27 Utah State Aggies men's basketball team will represent Utah State University during the 2026–27 NCAA Division I men's basketball season. The Aggies will be led by first-year head coach Ben Jacobson and will play their home games at the Smith Spectrum in Logan, Utah as a member of the Pac-12 Conference. This will mark Utah State's first season as members of the Pac-12 Conference after spending the previous thirteen seasons as members of the Mountain West Conference.

== Previous season ==
Utah State finished the 2025-26 season 29–7, 15–5 in the Mountain West Conference to finish first in the conference. As the top seed in the Mountain West Tournament they would defeat 8-seed UNLV in the Quarterfinals and 5-seed Nevada in the Semifinals to advance to the Championship against 2-seed San Diego State. The Aggies defeated the Aztecs 73-62 to win claim the tournament championship. As a result, they received the conference's autobid to the NCAA Tournament as the 9-seed in the West region. Utah State defeated 8-seed Villanova in the First round before falling to top-seeded Arizona 66–78 in the Second round to end their season.

Two days after the season's conclusion, head coach Jerrod Calhoun left to take the same position at his alma mater, Cincinnati. On March 30, 2026, the school named Northern Iowa head coach Ben Jacobson as the team's new head coach.

== Offseason ==
=== Departures ===
Utah State Aggies departures
Name	Number	Pos.	Height	Weight	Year	Hometown	Reason for departure
Elijah Perryman	1	G	6'2"	190	Freshman	San Francisco, CA	Transferred to Cincinnati
MJ Collins Jr.	2	G	6'4"	195	Senior	Clover, SC	Transferred to Cincinnati
Tucker Anderson	3	G/F	6'9"	230	Junior	Centerton, AR	Transferred to Central Arkansas
Jordy Barnes	5	G	6'4"	185	Sophomore	Holladay, UT	Transferred to Utah Valley
Kolby King	7	G	6'1"	185	Senior	Pompano Beach, FL	Transferred to Auburn
Drake Allen	8	G	6'5"	205	Graduate	Eagle Mountain, UT	Out of eligibility
Garry Clark	11	F	6'9"	220	Graduate	St. Louis, MO	Out of eligibility
David Iweze	13	F	6'10"	240	Freshman	Roanoke, TX	Transferred to Cincinnati
Luke Kearney	20	F	6'7"	220	Junior	Phoenix, AZ	Transferred to Portland State
Zach Keller	32	F	6'10"	245	Senior	Highlands Ranch, CO	Out of eligibility
Adlan Elamin	35	G/F	6'9"	185	Freshman	Arlington, VA	Transferred to Cincinnati

=== Incoming transfers ===
Utah State Aggies incoming transfers
Name	Number	Pos.	Height	Weight	Year	Hometown	Previous School
AJ Bates	3	G	6'4"	200	Junior	Houston, TX	Louisiana Tech
Solomon Callaghan	10	G	6'2"	195	Junior	Wadsworth, OH	Wright State
Connor Turnbull	11	F	6'11"	225	Graduate	St. Paul, MO	Evansville
Will Hornseth	13	F	6'9"	235	Junior	De Pere, WI	Northern Iowa
Collin Mulholland	21	F	6'11"	240	Junior	Kitchener, ON, Canada	Chattanooga
Dallin Hall	30	G	6'4"	200	Graduate	Plain City, UT	Virginia
Sean Felts	32	C	7'0"	225	Junior	St. George, UT	Snow College
Bron Roberts	48	C	7'0"	215	Sophomore	Lindon, UT	Snow College

=== 2026 recruiting class ===
College recruiting
Name	Hometown	School	Height	Weight	Commit date
Jax Allen; SG	Orem, UT	Orem HS	6 ft 4 in (1.93 m)	190 lb (86 kg)	Nov 10, 2024
Jax Allen; SG	Recruit ratings: Rivals: 247Sports: ESPN: (NR)				
Jordan Boyd; CG	St. Louis, MO	De Smet Jesuit HS	6 ft 4 in (1.93 m)	190 lb (86 kg)	Apr 14, 2026
Jordan Boyd; CG	Recruit ratings: Rivals: 247Sports: ESPN: (NR)				
Overall recruit ranking: Scout: – Rivals: –
Note: In many cases, Scout, Rivals, 247Sports, On3, and ESPN may conflict in their listings of height and weight.; In these cases, the average was taken. ESPN grades are on a 100-point scale.; Sources: "2026 Utah State Basketball Recruiting Commits". Scout.; "Scout.com Team Recruiting Rankings". Scout.; "2026 Team Ranking". Rivals.

== Roster ==
2026–27 Utah State Aggies men's basketball team
Players
Coaches

Pos.	#	Name	Height	Weight	Year	Previous school	Hometown
G	0	Jax Allen	6 ft 5 in (1.96 m)	190 lb (86 kg)	Fr	Orem HS	Eagle Mountain, Utah
G	1	Jordan Boyd	6 ft 4 in (1.93 m)	190 lb (86 kg)	Fr	De Smet Jesuit HS	St. Louis, Missouri
G	2	Ace Reiser	6 ft 0 in (1.83 m)	175 lb (79 kg)	So	College of Southern Idaho	South Jordan, Utah
G	3	AJ Bates	6 ft 4 in (1.93 m)	200 lb (91 kg)	Jr	Louisiana Tech	Houston, Texas
G	7	Brayden Boe	6 ft 5 in (1.96 m)	200 lb (91 kg)	So	Dream City Christian School	Beaverton, Oregon
G	10	Solomon Callaghan	6 ft 2 in (1.88 m)	195 lb (88 kg)	Jr	Wright State	Wadsworth, Ohio
F	11	Connor Turnbull	6 ft 11 in (2.11 m)	225 lb (102 kg)	GS	Evansville	St. Paul, Missouri
G	12	Mason Falslev	6 ft 4 in (1.93 m)	200 lb (91 kg)	Sr	Sky View HS	Benson, Utah
F	13	Will Hornseth	6 ft 9 in (2.06 m)	235 lb (107 kg)	Jr	Northern Iowa	De Pere, Wisconsin
F	21	Collin Mulholland	6 ft 11 in (2.11 m)	240 lb (109 kg)	Jr	Chattanooga	Kitchener, Ontario, Canada
F	22	Karson Templin	6 ft 8 in (2.03 m)	225 lb (102 kg)	Sr	Lovejoy HS	Fairview, Texas
G/F	24	Kingston Tosi	6 ft 8 in (2.03 m)	210 lb (95 kg)	RS So	Millenium HS	Anchorage, Alaska
G	30	Dallin Hall	6 ft 4 in (1.93 m)	200 lb (91 kg)	GS	Virginia	Plain City, Utah
C	32	Sean Felts	7 ft 0 in (2.13 m)	225 lb (102 kg)	Jr	Snow College	St. George, Utah
C	48	Bron Roberts	7 ft 0 in (2.13 m)	215 lb (98 kg)	So	Snow College	Lindon, Utah

Head coach

- Ben Jacobson (North Dakota)

Assistant coach(es)

- PJ Hogan (Morningside)
- Gameli Ahelegbe (Minnesota State)
- Barret Peery (Southern Utah)
- Geoffrey Groselle (Creighton)
- Thomas Kithier (Valparaiso)

Legend

- (C) Team captain
- (S) Suspended
- (I) Ineligible
- (W) Walk-on
- Injured
- Current redshirt

Roster

== Schedule and results ==
Date time, TV	Rank^{#}	Opponent^{#}	Result	Record	High points	High rebounds	High assists	Site (attendance) city, state
Exhibition
October 10, 2026*; 2:00 p.m.		Denver	W 86–76		18 – Falslev	9 – Hornseth	5 – Falslev	Smith Spectrum (2,882); Logan, UT
October 17, 2026*; 8:00 p.m., ESPN+		at Saint Mary's	W 97–89		22 – Tosi	7 – Templin	6 – Hall	University Credit Union Pavilion; Moraga, CA
October 24, 2026*; 2:00 p.m.		Santa Clara	W 101–79		25 – Falslev	8 – Turnbull	4 – Bates	Smith Spectrum (3,459); Logan, UT
Regular season
November 2, 2026*; 7:30 p.m., Pac-12 YouTube		Idaho State	W 94–58	1–0	26 – Tosi	9 – Falslev	7 – Hall	Smith Spectrum (9,715); Logan, UT
November 7, 2026*; 2:00 p.m., Pac-12 YouTube		Omaha	W 90–56	2–0	22 – Falslev	10 – Falslev	7 – Tied	Smith Spectrum (8,596); Logan, UT
November 10, 2026*; 7:00 p.m., Pac-12 YouTube		Utah Tech	W 118–86	3–0	35 – Hall	8 – Tosi	7 – Hall	Smith Spectrum (8,532); Logan, UT
November 13, 2026*; 8:00 p.m., The CW		UC San Diego	W 120–82	4–0	33 – Falslev	12 – Falslev	6 – Bates	Smith Spectrum (9,518); Logan, UT
November 18, 2026*; 7:00 p.m., Pac-12 YouTube		Weber State	W 101–71	5–0	22 – Hornseth	8 – Hornseth	7 – Falslev	Smith Spectrum (8,721); Logan, UT
November 25, 2026*; 5:00 p.m., CBSSN		vs. SMU; Acrisure Series Pod 1						Acrisure Arena; Thousand Palms, CA
November 26, 2026*; 2:30 p.m., CBSSN		vs. USC; Acrisure Series Pod 1						Acrisure Arena; Thousand Palms, CA
November 29, 2026*; 12:00 p.m., The CW		at New Mexico						The Pit; Albuquerque, NM
December 5, 2026*; 4:30 p.m., The CW		Montana						Smith Spectrum; Logan, UT
December 9, 2026*; 8:00 p.m., FS1		at BYU; Rivalry						Marriott Center; Provo, UT
December 12, 2026*; 8:00 p.m., The CW		Winthrop						Smith Spectrum; Logan, UT
December 19, 2026*; 6:30 p.m., CBSSN		vs. Tulsa; Texas Legends College Classic						Comerica Center; Frisco, TX
December 21, 2026*; 4:30 p.m., CBSSN		vs. George Washington; Texas Legends College Classic						Comerica Center; Frisco, TX
December 29, 2026*; 7:00 p.m., Pac-12 YouTube		Pacific						Smith Spectrum; Logan, UT
January 1, 2027*; 2:00 p.m., Pac-12 YouTube		Westminster						Smith Spectrum; Logan, UT
January 6, 2027; 8:00 p.m., CBSSN		Boise State						Smith Spectrum; Logan, UT
January 10, 2027; 11:00 a.m., USA		at Texas State						Strahan Arena; San Marcos, TX
January 16, 2027; 4:45 p.m., The CW		at Oregon State						Gill Coliseum; Corvallis, OR
January 21, 2027; 6:00 p.m., USA		Gonzaga						Smith Spectrum; Logan, UT
January 23, 2027; 4:45 p.m., The CW		Washington State						Smith Spectrum; Logan, UT
January 27, 2027; 8:00 p.m., CBSSN		at Boise State						ExtraMile Arena; Boise, ID
January 30, 2027; 2:45 p.m., The CW		Oregon State						Smith Spectrum; Logan, UT
February 4, 2027; 7:00 p.m., USA		at San Diego State						Viejas Arena; San Diego, CA
February 6, 2027; 4:45 p.m., The CW		at Fresno State						Save Mart Center; Fresno, CA
February 10, 2027; 6:00/7:00 p.m., USA		Colorado State						Smith Spectrum; Logan, UT
February 13, 2027; 6:00 p.m., USA		at Gonzaga						McCarthey Athletic Center; Spokane, WA
February 17, 2027; 6:00 p.m., The CW		San Diego State						Smith Spectrum; Logan, UT
February 20, 2027*; 10:00 a.m., ESPNU		at Memphis						FedExForum; Memphis, TN
February 25, 2027; 8:00 p.m., USA		at Colorado State						Moby Arena; Fort Collins, CO
February 27, 2027; 4:30 p.m., USA		Fresno State						Smith Spectrum; Logan, UT
March 3, 2027; 6:00 p.m., CBSSN		Texas State						Smith Spectrum; Logan, UT
March 6, 2027; 6:00 p.m., The CW		at Washington State						Beasley Coliseum; Pullman, WA
Pac-12 tournament
March, 2027; TBD, TBD		vs. TBD						MGM Grand Garden Arena; Paradise, NV
*Non-conference game. ^{#}Rankings from AP Poll. (#) Tournament seedings in parentheses. All times are in Mountain Time.
