= 2026–27 Texas State Bobcats men's basketball team =

American college basketball season

2026–27 Texas State Bobcats men's basketball
- Conference: Pac-12 Conference
- Record: 5–0 (0–0 Pac-12)
- Head coach: Terrence Johnson (7th season)
- Associate head coach: Bennie Seltzer (7th season)
- Assistant coaches: Donte Mathis (6th season); Jay Smith (4th season); Vince Walden (1st season)
- Home arena: Strahan Arena (Capacity: 10,000)

2026–27 Pac-12 Conference men's basketball standings
	Conf.				Overall
Team	W		L	PCT	W		L	PCT
Texas State	0	–	0	–	5	–	0	1.000
Oregon State	0	–	0	–	4	–	0	1.000
San Diego State	0	–	0	–	4	–	0	1.000
Utah State	0	–	0	–	4	–	0	1.000
Colorado State	0	–	0	–	3	–	0	1.000
No. 22 Gonzaga	0	–	0	–	2	–	0	1.000
Boise State	0	–	0	–	3	–	1	.750
Fresno State	0	–	0	–	2	–	1	.667
Washington State	0	–	0	–	0	–	3	.000
† 2027 Pac-12 Tournament winner As of November 17, 2026; Rankings from AP poll

The 2026–27 Texas State Bobcats men's basketball team will represent Texas State University during the 2026–27 NCAA Division I men's basketball season. The Bobcats will be led by seventh-year head coach Terrence Johnson and will play their home games at the Strahan Arena in San Marcos, Texas as a member of the Pac-12 Conference. This will mark Texas State's first season as members of the Pac-12 Conference after spending the previous thirteen seasons as members of the Sun Belt Conference.

== Previous season ==
Texas State finished the 2025-26 season 19–13, 11–7 in the Sun Belt Conference to finish tied for second in the conference. As the 5-seed in the Sun Belt Tournament they were defeated by 8-seed Southern Miss in the Fourth round 77–81 to end their season.

== Offseason ==
=== Departures ===
Texas State Bobcats departures
Name	Number	Pos.	Height	Weight	Year	Hometown	Reason for departure
Franck Emmou	2	G	6'5"	190	(redshirt) Sophomore	Arlington, TX	Transferred to Tarleton State
Jalen Bolden	5	G	6'5"	200	Senior	Zachary, LA	Out of eligibility
Cameron Simpson	6	G	6'7"	181	(redshirt) Freshman	Orlando, FL	Transferred to Nicholls
Kyndall Davis	9	G	6'5"	200	Senior	Chicago, IL	Out of eligibility
Jaelyn Lee	10	G	6'6"	200	(redshirt) Junior	Paris, TX	Transferred to Prairie View A&M
Deke Thompson	21	G	6'4"	205	Freshman	Jenks, OK	Transferred to Omaha
Makai Willis	22	C	6'8"	235	Senior	Tallahassee, FL	Out of eligibility
Isaiah Barganier	23	F	6'7"	250	(redshirt) Junior	Fulshear, TX	Transferred to Alabama State
Tay Knox	24	C	6'9"	250	Senior	Troy, AL	Entered transfer portal

=== Incoming transfers ===
Texas State Bobcats incoming transfers
Name	Number	Pos.	Height	Weight	Year	Hometown	Previous School
Quel'Ron House	4	G	6'0"	180	Junior	Louisville, KY	Southern Illinois
Paul Djobet	10	F	6'7"	215	Senior	Lille, France	Omaha
Ronald Jessamy	21	F	6'8"	220	Senior	Philadelphia, PA	Cal State Bakersfield
KJ Younger	23	G	6'4"	220	Sophomore	Charlotte, NC	UNC Greensboro
Caleb Steger	30	G	6'5"	180	Sophomore	Dallas, TX	Boston College

=== 2026 recruiting class ===
College recruiting
Name	Hometown	School	Height	Weight	Commit date
David Abisogun; SF	Anaheim, CA	Fairmount Preparatory Academy	6 ft 8 in (2.03 m)	215 lb (98 kg)	Nov 13, 2025
David Abisogun; SF	Recruit ratings: Rivals: 247Sports: ESPN: (NR)				
Kole Grandison; SG	Montclair, NJ	Overtime Elite	6 ft 6 in (1.98 m)	205 lb (93 kg)	Apr 19, 2026
Kole Grandison; SG	Recruit ratings: Rivals: 247Sports: ESPN: (80)				
Randy Livingston Jr. PG	Miami, FL	Riviera Preparatory School	6 ft 2 in (1.88 m)	155 lb (70 kg)	Oct 17, 2025
Randy Livingston Jr. PG	Recruit ratings: Rivals: 247Sports: ESPN: (81)				
King Sanders; SF	Fayetteville, NC	Tennessee Collegiate Academy	6 ft 7 in (2.01 m)	215 lb (98 kg)	Feb 4, 2026
King Sanders; SF	Recruit ratings: Rivals: 247Sports: ESPN: (80)				
Overall recruit ranking: Scout: – Rivals: –
Note: In many cases, Scout, Rivals, 247Sports, On3, and ESPN may conflict in their listings of height and weight.; In these cases, the average was taken. ESPN grades are on a 100-point scale.; Sources: "2026 Texas State Basketball Recruiting Commits". Scout.; "Scout.com Team Recruiting Rankings". Scout.; "2026 Team Ranking". Rivals.

== Roster ==
2026–27 Texas State Bobcats men's basketball team
Players
Coaches

Pos.	#	Name	Height	Weight	Year	Previous school	Hometown
F	0	DJ Hall	6 ft 7 in (2.01 m)	220 lb (100 kg)	So	Plano East Senior HS	Plano, Texas
G	1	Ky Pernell	6 ft 3 in (1.91 m)	192 lb (87 kg)	Jr	Jones College	Moorhead, Mississippi
G	2	Dimp Pernell	6 ft 3 in (1.91 m)	187 lb (85 kg)	Jr	Jones College	Moorhead, Mississippi
C	3	Robert Fields	6 ft 9 in (2.06 m)	220 lb (100 kg)	So	McDonogh School	Baltimore, Maryland
G	4	Quel'Ron House	6 ft 0 in (1.83 m)	180 lb (82 kg)	Jr	Southern Illinois	Louisville, Kentucky
F	5	Kole Grandison	6 ft 6 in (1.98 m)	195 lb (88 kg)	Fr	Overtime Elite	Toronto, Ontario, Canada
G	8	Randy Livingston Jr.	6 ft 1 in (1.85 m)	170 lb (77 kg)	Fr	Riviera Preparatory School	Miami, Florida
G	9	Mark Drone	6 ft 0 in (1.83 m)	180 lb (82 kg)	Sr	Southwest Mississippi CC	Jackson, Mississippi
F	10	Paul Djobet	6 ft 7 in (2.01 m)	215 lb (98 kg)	Sr	Omaha	Lille, France
G	11	Kaden Gumbs	6 ft 2 in (1.88 m)	179 lb (81 kg)	Sr	San Marcos HS	San Marcos, Texas
F	14	David Abisogun	6 ft 9 in (2.06 m)	225 lb (102 kg)	Fr	Fairmont Preparatory Academy	Lagos, Nigeria
F	21	Ronald Jessamy	6 ft 8 in (2.03 m)	220 lb (100 kg)	Sr	Cal State Bakersfield	Philadelphia, Pennsylvania
F	22	King Sanders	6 ft 8 in (2.03 m)	200 lb (91 kg)	Fr	Tennessee Collegiate Academy	Fayetteville, North Carolina
G	23	KJ Younger	6 ft 4 in (1.93 m)	220 lb (100 kg)	So	UNC Greensboro	Charlotte, North Carolina
G	30	Caleb Steger	6 ft 5 in (1.96 m)	180 lb (82 kg)	So	Boston College	Dallas, Texas

Head coach

- Terrence Johnson (Southern)

Assistant coach(es)

- Bennie Seltzer (Washington State)
- Donte Mathis (Texas State)
- Jay Smith (LSU–Alexandria)
- Vince Walden (Longwood)

Legend

- (C) Team captain
- (S) Suspended
- (I) Ineligible
- (W) Walk-on
- Injured
- Current redshirt

Roster

== Schedule and results ==
Date time, TV	Rank^{#}	Opponent^{#}	Result	Record	High points	High rebounds	High assists	Site (attendance) city, state
Non-conference regular season
November 2, 2026*; 7:00 p.m., Pac-12 YouTube		Texas A&M–Corpus Christi	W 67–55	1–0	18 – Hall	5 – Hall	3 – Tied	Strahan Arena (1,553); San Marcos, TX
November 5, 2026*; 6:00 p.m., Pac-12 YouTube		Howard Payne	W 135–66	2–0	21 – Djobet	8 – Jessamy	5 – Djobet	Strahan Arena; San Marcos, TX
November 10, 2026*; 6:30 p.m., ESPN+		at UT Rio Grande Valley	W 72–65	3–0	26 – Pernell	7 – Tied	3 – Tied	UTRGV Fieldhouse (2,328); Edinburg, TX
November 13, 2026*; 7:00 p.m., Pac-12 YouTube		Southern Miss	W 85–65	4–0	15 – Jessamy	6 – Tied	3 – House	Strahan Arena (1,414); San Marcos, TX
November 15, 2026*; 7:00 p.m., ESPN2		at UTSA; I-35 Rivalry	W 87–67	5–0	19 – Hall	18 – Hall	4 – Hall	Convocation Center (1,242); San Antonio, TX
November 18, 2026*; 7:00 p.m., TBD		Incarnate Word						Strahan Arena; San Marcos, TX
November 22, 2026*; 2:30 p.m., The CW		McNeese						Strahan Arena; San Marcos, TX
November 25, 2026*; 4:00 p.m., TBD		vs. Alcorn State						Thomas Assembly Center; Ruston, LA
November 27, 2026*; 2:00 p.m., TBD		at Louisiana Tech						Thomas Assembly Center; Ruston, LA
November 29, 2026*; 4:00 p.m., TBD		Nicholls						Strahan Arena; San Marcos, TX
December 2, 2026*; 7:00 p.m., TBD		Louisiana Tech						Strahan Arena; San Marcos, TX
December 5, 2026*; 4:30 p.m., ESPN2		at Houston						Fertitta Center; Houston, TX
December 8, 2026*; 7:00 p.m., TBD		UT Rio Grande Valley						Strahan Arena; San Marcos, TX
December 13, 2026*; TBD, TBD		vs. North Texas; Coast-to-Coast Challenge						Dickies Arena; Fort Worth, TX
December 16, 2026*; 7:30 p.m., TBD		San Francisco						Strahan Arena; San Marcos, TX
December 19, 2026*; 1:30 p.m., USA		Texas Southern						Strahan Arena; San Marcos, TX
Pac-12 regular season
January 6, 2027; TBD, The CW		at Colorado State						Moby Arena; Fort Collins, CO
January 10, 2027; 12:00 p.m., USA		Utah State						Strahan Arena; San Marcos, TX
January 14, 2027; 6:00 p.m., USA		Oregon State						Strahan Arena; San Marcos, TX
January 20, 2027; 9:00 p.m., USA		at San Diego State						Viejas Arena; San Diego, CA
January 23, 2027; 3:30 p.m., USA		at Fresno State						Save Mart Center; Fresno, CA
January 27, 2027; 7:00 p.m., TBD		Colorado State						Strahan Arena; San Marcos, TX
January 30, 2027; 1:30 p.m., The CW		Boise State						Strahan Arena; San Marcos, TX
February 4, 2027; 9:00 p.m., CBSSN		at Gonzaga						McCarthey Athletic Center; Spokane, WA
February 6, 2027; 8:00 p.m., The CW		at Washington State						Beasley Coliseum; Pullman, WA
February 11, 2027; 7:00 p.m., The CW		San Diego State						Strahan Arena; San Marcos, TX
February 14, 2027; 2:30 p.m., The CW		at Oregon State						Gill Coliseum; Corvallis, OR
February 18, 2027; 7:00 p.m., USA		Fresno State						Strahan Arena; San Marcos, TX
February 20, 2027; 5:30 p.m., USA		at Boise State						ExtraMile Arena; Boise, ID
February 25, 2027; 7:00 p.m., USA		Gonzaga						Strahan Arena; San Marcos, TX
February 27, 2027; 1:15 p.m., The CW		Washington State						Strahan Arena; San Marcos, TX
March 3, 2027; 7:00 p.m., CBSSN		at Utah State						Smith Spectrum; Logan, UT
Pac-12 tournament
March, 2027; TBD, TBD		vs. TBD						MGM Grand Garden Arena; Paradise, NV
*Non-conference game. ^{#}Rankings from AP Poll. (#) Tournament seedings in parentheses. All times are in Central Time.
