= 2026–27 Washington State Cougars men's basketball team =

American college basketball season

2026–27 Washington State Cougars men's basketball
- Conference: Pac-12 Conference
- Record: 2–4 (0–0 Pac-12)
- Head coach: David Riley (3rd season)
- Associate head coach: Pedro Garcia Rosado (3rd season)
- Assistant coaches: Orlando Johnson (2nd season); Donald Brady (3rd season); Jerry Brown (3rd season); George Galanopoulos (3rd season)
- Home arena: Beasley Coliseum (Capacity: 12,058)

2026–27 Pac-12 Conference men's basketball standings
	Conf.				Overall
Team	W		L	PCT	W		L	PCT
Oregon State	0	–	0	–	6	–	0	1.000
Texas State	0	–	0	–	6	–	0	1.000
San Diego State	0	–	0	–	5	–	0	1.000
Utah State	0	–	0	–	5	–	0	1.000
Colorado State	0	–	0	–	4	–	1	.800
No. 22 Gonzaga	0	–	0	–	3	–	1	.750
Fresno State	0	–	0	–	4	–	2	.667
Boise State	0	–	0	–	3	–	2	.600
Washington State	0	–	0	–	2	–	3	.400
† 2027 Pac-12 Tournament winner As of November 22, 2026; Rankings from AP poll

The 2026–27 Washington State Cougars men's basketball team will represent Washington State University during the 2026–27 NCAA Division I men's basketball season. The Cougars will be led by third-year head coach David Riley and will play their home games at the Beasley Coliseum in Pullman, Washington as a member of the Pac-12 Conference. This will mark Washington State's first season returning as members of the Pac-12 Conference (109th overall) after spending the previous two seasons as members of the West Coast Conference.

== Previous season ==
Washington State finished the 2025–26 season 12–20, 7–11 in the West Coast Conference play to finish in eighth place. As the 8-seed in the WCC Tournament, they received a first-round bye before losing to Portland 68-74 in the Second round to end their season.

== Offseason ==
=== Departures ===
Washington State Cougars departures
Name	Number	Pos.	Height	Weight	Year	Hometown	Reason for departure
Emmanuel Ugbo	0	F	6'8"	245	Senior	Barendrecht, Netherlands	Unknown
Eemeli Yalaho	2	G	6'8"	235	Junior	Jyväskylä, Finland	Transferred to NC State
Simon Hildebrandt	3	F	6'9"	240	Senior	Winnipeg, MB, Canada	Graduated; signed with the Winnipeg Sea Bears
Brunel Madzou	4	G	6'0"		Freshman	Tampere, Finland	Departed program
Tómas Thrastarson	5	G	6'7"	215	Sophomore	Thorlakshofn, Iceland	Transferred to Seattle
Parker Gerrits	10	G	6'2"	190	(redshirt) Sophomore	Olympia, WA	Transferred to Wyoming
Jerone Morton	11	G	6'4"	180	Junior	Lexington, KY	Transferred to Kentucky
Adrià Rodriguez	13	G	6'4"		Senior	Sant Just Desvern, Spain	Graduated
Rihards Vavers	15	F	6'7"	210	Junior	Ādaži, Latvia	Transferred to Memphis
Ace Glass	21	G	6'3"	185	Freshman	Rialto, CA	Transferred to Vanderbilt
ND Okafor	22	F	6'10"	250	(redshirt) Junior	Dundalk, Ireland	Transferred to Mississippi State
Kase Wynott	51	G	6'6"	215	Sophomore	Lapwai, ID	Transferred to Idaho

=== Incoming transfers ===
Washington State Cougars incoming transfers
Name	Number	Pos.	Height	Weight	Year	Hometown	Previous School
Ronnie Harrison	0	F	6'8"	210	Senior	Forney, TX	East Texas A&M
Tyler Kropp	2	F	6'9"	230	Sophomore	Powell, OH	Northwestern
Jaylen Harrell	3	G	6'5"	210	(redshirt) Freshman	Boston, MA	Providence
Lazarek Houston	7	G	6'0"	155	Sophomore	Lincoln, NE	Central Missouri
RJ Jones	8	G	6'2"	190	Junior	Denton, TX	TCU
Sebastian Akins	10	G	6'2"	175	Junior	Concord, NC	Wake Forest
Fraser Roxburgh	13	F	6'7"	215	Junior	Melbourne, Australia	Manhattan
Ladji Dembele	21	F	6'8"	255	(redshirt) Junior	Newark, NJ	UNLV
Casey Jones	31	G	6'6"	220	Senior	Sammamish, WA	Eastern Washington
Jamari Phillips	33	G	6'4"	195	Junior	Oakland, CA	Oregon

=== 2026 recruiting class ===
College recruiting
Name	Hometown	School	Height	Weight	Commit date
Brayden Kyman; PF	Santa Margarita, CA	Santa Margarita Catholic High School	6 ft 7 in (2.01 m)	195 lb (88 kg)	Sep 24, 2024
Brayden Kyman; PF	Recruit ratings: Rivals: 247Sports: ESPN: (78)				
Overall recruit ranking:
Note: In many cases, Scout, Rivals, 247Sports, On3, and ESPN may conflict in their listings of height and weight.; In these cases, the average was taken. ESPN grades are on a 100-point scale.; Sources: "2024 Washington State Commits". Rivals.; "Men's Basketball Recruiting". Scout.; "ESPN- Washington State Cougars Men's Basketball Recruiting". ESPN.; "Scout.com Team Recruiting Rankings". Scout.; "2024 Team Ranking". Rivals.

== Roster ==
2026–27 Washington State Cougars men's basketball team
Players
Coaches

Pos.	#	Name	Height	Weight	Year	Previous school	Hometown
F	0	Ronnie Harrison	6 ft 8 in (2.03 m)	210 lb (95 kg)	Sr	East Texas A&M	Forney, Texas
F	2	Tyler Kropp	6 ft 9 in (2.06 m)	230 lb (104 kg)	So	Northwestern	Powell, Ohio
G	3	Jaylen Harrell	6 ft 5 in (1.96 m)	210 lb (95 kg)	RS Fr	Providence	Boston, Massachusetts
G	5	Dio Blakely	6 ft 0 in (1.83 m)	160 lb (73 kg)	So	SoCal Academy	Los Angeles, California
G	7	Lazerek Houston	6 ft 0 in (1.83 m)	155 lb (70 kg)	So	Central Missouri	Lincoln, Nebraska
G	8	RJ Jones	6 ft 2 in (1.88 m)	190 lb (86 kg)	Jr	TCU	Denton, Texas
G	10	Sebastian Akins	6 ft 2 in (1.88 m)	175 lb (79 kg)	Jr	Wake Forest	Concord, North Carolina
G	11	Pedro Sancho Moraga	6 ft 0 in (1.83 m)	205 lb (93 kg)	Fr	Zentro C.B.	Valencia, Spain
G	12	Roman Stathis	6 ft 7 in (2.01 m)	225 lb (102 kg)	Fr	Golden State Prep	Sydney, Australia
F	13	Fraser Roxburgh	6 ft 7 in (2.01 m)	215 lb (98 kg)	Jr	Manhattan	Melbourne, Australia
F	21	Ladji Dembele	6 ft 8 in (2.03 m)	255 lb (116 kg)	RS Jr	UNLV	Newark, New Jersey
F	24	Dominik Robinson	6 ft 10 in (2.08 m)	225 lb (102 kg)	RS Fr	Rainier Beach HS	Graham, Washington
G	31	Casey Jones	6 ft 6 in (1.98 m)	220 lb (100 kg)	Sr	Eastern Washington	Sammamish, Washington
G	33	Jamari Phillips	6 ft 4 in (1.93 m)	195 lb (88 kg)	Jr	Oregon	Oakland, California
F	34	Brayden Kyman	6 ft 8 in (2.03 m)	225 lb (102 kg)	Fr	Santa Margarita Catholic HS	Aliso Viejo, California
F	93	Mohamed Sankhe	6 ft 10 in (2.08 m)	265 lb (120 kg)		JA Vichy	France

Head coach

- David Riley (Whitworth)

Assistant coach(es)

- Orlando Johnson (Loyola Marymount)
- Donald Brady (Redlands)
- Jerry Brown (Fresno State)
- Pedro Garcia Rosado (Open)
- George Galanopoulos (Indiana)

Legend

- (C) Team captain
- (S) Suspended
- (I) Ineligible
- (W) Walk-on
- Injured
- Current redshirt

Roster
Last update: 2026-10-18

== Schedule and results ==
Date time, TV	Rank^{#}	Opponent^{#}	Result	Record	High points	High rebounds	High assists	Site (attendance) city, state
Exhibition
October 18, 2026*; 1:00 p.m., MW+		at New Mexico	L 64–92		14 – Houston	6 – Kropp	4 – Tied	The Pit (6,168); Albuquerque, NM
October 25, 2026*; 1:00 p.m., B1G+		at Washington; Rivalry	W 84–80		23 – Harrison	11 – Harrison	4 – Houston	Alaska Airlines Arena (7,011); Seattle, WA
Non-conference regular season
November 2, 2026*; 6:00 p.m., Pac-12 YouTube		Davidson	L 61–76	0–1	13 – Harrell	6 – Kropp	4 – RJ Jones	Beasley Coliseum (2,530); Pullman, WA
November 7, 2026*; 2:00 p.m., ESPN+		at High Point	L 71–83	0–2	31 – Houston	7 – Sankhe	3 – Tied	Qubein Center (4,734); High Point, NC
November 10, 2026*; 4:00 p.m., ESPN+		at Duquesne	L 71–72	0–3	19 – Harrell	5 – Tied	5 – Tied	UPMC Cooper Fieldhouse (2,377); Pittsburgh, PA
November 14, 2026*; 10:00 a.m., Pac-12 YouTube		Northwest (Wash.) (NAIA)	W 123–87	1–3	27 – Akins	8 – Robinson	5 – Akins	Beasley Coliseum (2,624); Pullman, WA
November 18, 2026*; 7:00 p.m.		vs. Hawaii	W 79–63	2–3	16 – Houston	11 – Houston	9 – Houston	Angel of the Winds Arena (2,168); Everett, WA
November 21, 2026*; 8:00 p.m., ESPN2		vs. No. 5 Duke; Acrisure Series	L 74–78	2–4	15 – Tied	5 – Tied	5 – Harrison	Acrisure Arena; Thousand Palms, CA
November 24, 2026*; 6:00 p.m., Pac-12 YouTube		Sam Houston						Beasley Coliseum; Pullman, WA
November 27, 2026*; 5:00 p.m., Pac-12 YouTube		Idaho; Battle of the Palouse						Beasley Coliseum; Pullman, WA
November 30, 2026*; 5:00 p.m., ESPN+		at Murray State						CFSB Center; Murray, KY
December 3, 2026*; 5:00 p.m., ESPN+		at Southern Illinois						Banterra Center; Carbondale, IL
December 6, 2026*; 1:00 p.m., The CW		North Dakota State						Beasley Coliseum; Pullman, WA
December 9, 2026*; 11:00 a.m., ESPN+		at Weber State						Dee Events Center; Ogden, UT
December 12, 2026*; 12:45 p.m., The CW		vs. UNLV; Jack Jones Classic						Lee's Family Forum; Henderson, NV
December 19, 2026*; 4:30 p.m.		vs. Seattle; Seattle Holiday Classic						Climate Pledge Arena; Seattle, WA
December 22, 2026*; TBD		vs. Eastern Washington; 509 Classic						Numerica Veterans Arena; Spokane, WA
December 28, 2026*; 5:00 p.m., SECN+		at LSU						Pete Maravich Assembly Center; Baton Rouge, LA
Pac-12 regular season
January 3, 2027; 1:00 p.m., The CW		at Fresno State						Save Mart Center; Fresno, CA
January 6, 2027; 6:00 p.m., The CW		Gonzaga; Rivalry						Beasley Coliseum; Pullman, WA
January 13, 2027; 6:00 p.m., CBSSN		at Boise State						ExtraMile Arena; Boise, ID
January 17, 2027; 1:00 p.m., CBSSN		San Diego State						Beasley Coliseum; Pullman, WA
January 21, 2027; 7:00 p.m., USA		at Colorado State						Moby Arena; Fort Collins, CO
January 23, 2027; 3:45 p.m., The CW		at Utah State						Smith Spectrum; Logan, UT
January 27, 2027; 7:00 p.m., The CW		Oregon State						Beasley Coliseum; Pullman, WA
January 30, 2027; 5:30 p.m., USA		Fresno State						Beasley Coliseum; Pullman, WA
February 6, 2027; 6:00 p.m., The CW		Texas State						Beasley Coliseum; Pullman, WA
February 10, 2027; 7:00/8:00 p.m., USA		at Oregon State						Gill Coliseum; Corvallis, OR
February 13, 2027; 4:45 p.m., The CW		Colorado State						Beasley Coliseum; Pullman, WA
February 17, 2027; 7:00 p.m., CBSSN		at Gonzaga; Rivalry						McCarthey Athletic Center; Spokane, WA
February 20, 2027; 1:30 p.m., USA		at San Diego State						Viejas Arena; San Diego, CA
February 25, 2027; TBD, The CW		Boise State						Beasley Coliseum; Pullman, WA
February 27, 2027; 11:15 a.m., The CW		at Texas State						Strahan Arena; San Marcos, TX
March 6, 2027; 4:45 p.m., The CW		Utah State						Beasley Coliseum; Pullman, WA
Pac-12 tournament
March 9–13, 2027; TBA, USA		vs. TBD						MGM Grand Garden Arena; Paradise, NV
*Non-conference game. ^{#}Rankings from AP Poll. (#) Tournament seedings in parentheses. All times are in Pacific Time.

== Game summaries ==
=== Exhibition: at New Mexico ===
Series History: New Mexico leads 3-2
Starting Lineups:

- Washington State: Ronnie Harrison, Tyler Kropp, Lazerek Houston, Ladji Dembele, Jamari Phillips
- New Mexico: Hudson Mayes, Uriah Tennette, Chris Howell, Jake Hall, Fynn Lastring

MW+

Oct. 18
1 p.m. PDT

Washington State Cougars 64, New Mexico Lobos 92
Scoring by half: 26-51, 38-41
Pts: Lazerek Houston 14; Rebs: Tyler Kropp 6 Asts: Ronnie Harrison, Jaylen Harrell 4	Pts: Jake Hall 22; Rebs: Chris Howell 9 Asts: Uriah Tennette 5

The Pit
Albuquerque, NM
Attendance: 6,168
Referees: Jeffrey Anderson, Kevin Brill, Brian McNutt

=== Exhibition: at Washington ===
Series History: Washington leads 190-111
Starting Lineups:

- Washington State: #0 Ronnie Harrison, #2 Tyler Kropp, #7 Lazarek Houston, #21 Ladji Dembele, #33 Jamari Phillips
- Washington: #8 LeJuan Watts, #9 Wesley Yates III, #11 Steele Venters, #12 Tayshawn Comer, #24 Lathan Somerville

B1G+

Oct. 25
1 p.m. PDT

Washington State Cougars 84, Washington Huskies 80
Scoring by half: 38-37, 46-43
Pts: Ronnie Harrison 23; Rebs: Ronnie Harrison 11; Asts: Lazarek Houston 4	Pts: LeJuan Watts 28; Rebs: Nikola Dzepina 12; Asts: Tayshawn Comer 5

Alaska Airlines Arena
Seattle, WA
Attendance: 7,011
Referees: Michael Reed, Verne Harris, John Floyd

=== Davidson ===
Broadcasters: Trevor Williams and Gwen Begley

Series history: Davidson leads 1-0
Starting lineups:

- Davidson: #4 Josh Scovens, #5 Jackson Keith, #11 Sam Brown, #16 Ian Platteeuw, #25 Nick Janowski
- Washington State: #2 Tyler Kropp, #7 Lazarek Houston, #21 Ladji Dembele, #31 Casey Jones, #33 Jamari Phillips

Nov. 2
6 p.m. PST

Recap

Davidson Wildcats 76, Washington State Cougars 61
Scoring by half: 34-22, 42-39
Pts: Sam Brown 22; Rebs: Ian Platteeuw 9 Asts: Ian Platteeuw 8	Pts: Jaylen Harrell 13; Rebs: Tyler Kropp 6 Asts: RJ Jones 4

Beasley Coliseum
Pullman, WA
Attendance: 2,530
Referees: Ryan Holmes, Chance Wallesen and Chris Hudson

=== at High Point ===
Broadcasters: Luke Hallett and Stan Lewter

Series history: Washington State leads 1-0
Starting lineups:

- Washington State: #2 Tyler Kropp, #3 Jaylen Harrell, #7 Lazerek Houston, #10 Sebastian Akins, #21 Ladji Dembele
- High Point: #00 Curtis Williams Jr., #4 CJ Brown, #11 Cam'Ron Fletcher, #15 Braden Hausen, #32 Isaac Garrett

ESPN+

Nov. 7
2 p.m. PST

Recap

Washington State Cougars 71, High Point Panthers 83
Scoring by half: 31-32, 40-51
Pts: Lazerek Houston 31; Rebs: Mohamed Sankhe 7 Asts: Jaylen Harrell, Lazerek Houston, Sebastian Akins, Casey Jones 3	Pts: CJ Brown 17; Rebs: Cam'Ron Fletcher 7 Asts: CJ Brown, Conrad Martinez 4

Qubein Center
High Point, NC
Attendance: 4,734
Referees: Chase Shaw, Trey Styons, Jemel Spearman

=== at Duquesne ===
Broadcasters: Tim Benz and Ellis Cannon

Series history: First meeting
Starting lineups:

- Washington State: #0 Ronnie Harrison, #3 Jaylen Harrell, #7 Lazarek Houston, #10 Sebastian Akins, #21 Ladji Dembele
- Duquesne: #4 Izaiah Pasha, #8 Arness Lawson, #16 Ege Demir, #20 Kerem Konan, #42 Yoav Berman

ESPN+

Nov. 10
4 p.m. PST

Recap

Washington State Cougars 71, Duquesne Dukes 72
Scoring by half: 39-30, 32-42
Pts: Jaylen Harrell 19; Rebs: Ronnie Harrison, Sebastian Akins, Dominik Robinson 5 Asts: Jaylen Harrell, Lazarek Houston 5	Pts: Josh Smith, Kerem Konan 13; Rebs: Yoav Berman 7 Asts: Kerem Konan 9

UPMC Cooper Fieldhouse
Pittsburgh, PA
Attendance: 2,377
Referees: Lamar Simpson, Mike Palau, Nick Terry

=== Northwest (Wash.) (NAIA) ===
Broadcasters: Trevor Williams and Stephen Madison

Series history: First meeting
Starting lineups:

- Northwest: #1 Isaiah White, #3 Christian Watkins, #11 Dejuan Sims, #15 Darek Usitalo, #24 Hudson Yarbrough
- Washington State: #3 Jaylen Harrell, #7 Lazarek Houston, #10 Sebastian Akins, #13 Fraser Roxburgh, #21 Ladji Dembele

Pac-12 YouTube

Nov. 14
10 a.m. PST

Recap

Northwest Eagles 87, Washington State Cougars 123
Scoring by half: 42-69, 45-54
Pts: Nick Cubley, Christian Watkins 16; Rebs: Isaiah White 5 Asts: Kyle Robinson Jr. 7	Pts: Sebastian Akins 27; Rebs: Dominik Robinson 8 Asts: Sebastian Akins 5

Beasley Coliseum
Pullman, WA
Attendance: 2,624
Referees: Matthew Rukasin, Jimmy Casas (1st half), Hayden Hilty

=== vs. Hawaii ===
Broadcasters:

Series history: Washington State leads 5-2
Starting lineups:

- Hawaii:
- Washington State:

Nov. 18
7:00 p.m. PST

Hawaii Rainbow Warriors vs. Washington State Cougars

Angel of the Winds Arena
Everett, WA

=== vs. Duke ===
Broadcasters: Dave O'Brien and Sean Farnham

Series history: First meeting
Starting lineups:

- Duke:
- Washington State:

ESPN2

Nov. 21
8 p.m. PST

Duke Blue Devils vs. Washington State Cougars

Acrisure Arena
Palm Desert, CA

=== Sam Houston ===
Broadcasters:

Series history: First meeting
Starting lineups:

- Sam Houston
- Washington State:

Nov. 24
6 p.m. PST

Sam Houston Bearkats vs. Washington State Cougars

Beasley Coliseum
Pullman, WA

=== Idaho ===
Broadcasters:

Series history: Washington State leads 169-111
Starting lineups:

- Idaho:
- Washington State:

Nov. 27
5 p.m. PST

Idaho Vandals vs. Washington State Cougars

Beasley Coliseum
Pullman, WA

=== at Murray State ===
Broadcasters:

Series history: First meeting
Starting lineups:

- Washington State:
- Murray State:

Nov. 30
5 p.m. PST

Washington State Cougars vs. Murray State Racers

CFSB Center
Murray, KY

=== at Southern Illinois ===
Broadcasters:

Series history: First meeting
Starting lineups:

- Washington State:
- Southern Illinois:

Dec. 3
5 p.m. PST

Washington State Cougars vs. Southern Illinois Salukis

Banterra Center
Carbondale, IL

=== North Dakota State ===
Broadcasters:

Series history: First meeting
Starting lineups:

- North Dakota State
- Washington State:

The CW

Dec. 6
1 p.m. PST

North Dakota State Bison vs. Washington State Cougars

Beasley Coliseum
Pullman, WA

=== at Weber State ===
Broadcasters:

Series history: Washington State leads 2-0 Starting lineups:

- Washington State:
- Weber State:

ESPN+

Dec. 9
11 a.m. PST

Washington State Cougars vs. Weber State Wildcats

Dee Events Center
Ogden, UT

=== vs. UNLV ===
Broadcasters:

Series history: UNLV leads 1-0
Starting lineups:

- Washington State:
- UNLV:

The CW

Dec. 12
12:45 p.m.

Washington State Cougars vs. UNLV Runnin' Rebels

Lee's Family Forum
Henderson, NV

=== vs. Seattle ===
Broadcasters:

Series history: Tied 10-10
Starting lineups:

- Seattle:
- Washington State:

Dec. 19
4:30 p.m. PST

Seattle Redhawks vs. Washington State Cougars

Climate Pledge Arena
Seattle, WA

=== vs. Eastern Washington ===
Broadcasters:

Series history: Washington State leads 60-13
Starting lineups:

- Washington State:
- Eastern Washington:

Dec. 22

Washington State Cougars vs. Eastern Washington Eagles

Numerica Veterans Arena
Spokane, WA

=== at LSU ===
Broadcasters:

Series history: Tied 2-2
Starting lineups:

- Washington State:
- LSU:

SECN+

Dec. 28
5 p.m. PST

Washington State Cougars vs. LSU Tigers

Pete Maravich Assembly Center
Baton Rouge, LA

=== at Fresno State ===
Broadcasters:

Series history: Washington State leads 10-3 Starting lineups:

- Washington State:
- Fresno State:

The CW

Jan. 3
1 p.m. PST

Washington State Cougars vs. Fresno State Bulldogs

Save Mart Center
Fresno, CA

=== Gonzaga ===
Broadcasters:

Series history: Washington State leads 98-56 Starting lineups:

- Gonzaga:
- Washington State:

The CW

Jan. 6
6 p.m. PST

Gonzaga Bulldogs vs. Washington State Cougars

Beasley Coliseum
Pullman, WA

=== at Boise State ===
Broadcasters:

Series history: Washington State leads 6-4 Starting lineups:

- Washington State:
- Boise State:

CBSSN

Jan. 13
6 p.m. PST

Washington State Cougars vs. Boise State Broncos

ExtraMile Arena
Boise, ID

=== San Diego State ===
Broadcasters:

Series history: Tied 3-3
Starting lineups:

- San Diego State:
- Washington State:

CBSSN

Jan. 17
1 p.m. PST

San Diego State Aztecs vs. Washington State Cougars

Beasley Coliseum
Pullman, WA

=== at Colorado State ===
Broadcasters:

Series history: Colorado State leads 9-1
Starting lineups:

- Washington State:
- Colorado State:

USA

Jan. 21
7 p.m. PST

Washington State Cougars vs. Colorado State Rams

Moby Arena
Fort Collins, CO

=== at Utah State ===
Broadcasters:

Series history: Utah State leads 8-1
Starting lineups:

- Washington State:
- Utah State:

The CW

Jan. 23
3:45 p.m. PST

Washington State Cougars vs. Utah State Aggies

Smith Spectrum
Logan, UT

=== Oregon State ===
Broadcasters:

Series history: Oregon State leads 176-133 Starting lineups:

- Oregon State:
- Washington State:

The CW

Jan. 27
7 p.m. PST

Oregon State Beavers vs. Washington State Cougars

Beasley Coliseum
Pullman, WA

=== Fresno State ===
Broadcasters:

Series history: Starting lineups:

- Fresno State:
- Washington State:

USA

Jan. 30
5:30 p.m.

Fresno State Bulldogs vs. Washington State Cougars

Beasley Coliseum
Pullman, WA

=== Texas State ===
Broadcasters:

Series history: Washington State leads 2-0 Starting lineups:

- Texas State:
- Washington State:

The CW

Feb. 6
6 p.m. PST

Texas State Bobcats vs. Washington State Cougars

Beasley Coliseum
Pullman, WA

=== at Oregon State ===
Broadcasters:

Series history: Starting lineups:

- Washington State:
- Oregon State:

USA

Feb. 10
7 or 8 p.m. PST

Washington State Cougars vs. Oregon State Beavers

Gill Coliseum
Corvallis, OR

=== Colorado State ===
Broadcasters:

Series history: Starting lineups:

- Colorado State:
- Washington State:

The CW

Feb. 13
4:45 p.m.

Colorado State Rams vs. Washington State Cougars

Beasley Coliseum
Pullman, WA

=== at Gonzaga ===
Broadcasters:

Series history: Starting lineups:

- Washington State:
- Gonzaga:

CBSSN

Feb. 17
7 p.m. PST

Washington State Cougars vs. Gonzaga Bulldogs

McCarthey Athletic Center
Spokane, WA

=== at San Diego State ===
Broadcasters:

Series history: Starting lineups:

- Washington State:
- San Diego State:

USA

Feb. 20
1:30 p.m.

Washington State Cougars vs. San Diego State Aztecs

Viejas Arena
San Diego, CA

=== Boise State ===
Broadcasters:

Series history: Starting lineups:

- Boise State:
- Washington State:

The CW

Feb. 25
TBA

Boise State Broncos vs. Washington State Cougars

Beasley Coliseum
Pullman, WA

=== at Texas State ===
Broadcasters:

Series history: Starting lineups:

- Washington State:
- Texas State:

The CW

Feb. 27
11:15 a.m. PST

Washington State Cougars vs. Texas State Bobcats

Strahan Arena
San Marcos, TX

=== Utah State ===
Broadcasters:

Series history: Starting lineups:

- Utah State:
- Washington State:

The CW

Mar. 6
4:45 p.m.

Utah State Aggies vs. Washington State Cougars

Beasley Coliseum
Pullman, WA
