= 2026–27 Oregon State Beavers men's basketball team =

American college basketball season

2026–27 Oregon State Beavers men's basketball
- Conference: Pac-12 Conference
- Record: 6–0 (0–0 Pac-12)
- Head coach: Justin Joyner (1st season)
- Associate head coach: Michael Plank (1st season); Danny Yoshikawa (1st season)
- Assistant coaches: Justin Argenal (1st season); Dominic Lippi (1st season); Alex Peavler (1st season)
- Home arena: Gill Coliseum (Capacity: 9,301)

2026–27 Pac-12 Conference men's basketball standings
	Conf.				Overall
Team	W		L	PCT	W		L	PCT
Oregon State	0	–	0	–	6	–	0	1.000
Texas State	0	–	0	–	6	–	0	1.000
San Diego State	0	–	0	–	5	–	0	1.000
Utah State	0	–	0	–	5	–	0	1.000
Colorado State	0	–	0	–	4	–	1	.800
No. 22 Gonzaga	0	–	0	–	3	–	1	.750
Fresno State	0	–	0	–	4	–	2	.667
Boise State	0	–	0	–	3	–	2	.600
Washington State	0	–	0	–	2	–	3	.400
† 2027 Pac-12 Tournament winner As of November 21, 2026; Rankings from AP poll

The 2026–27 Oregon State Beavers men's basketball team will represent Oregon State University during the 2026–27 NCAA Division I men's basketball season. The Beavers will be led by first-year head coach Justin Joyner and will play their home games at the Gill Coliseum in Corvallis, Oregon as a member of the Pac-12 Conference. This will mark Oregon State's first season returning as members of the Pac-12 Conference (105th overall) after spending the previous two seasons as members of the West Coast Conference.

== Previous season ==
Oregon State finished the 2025-26 season 17–16, 9–9 in the West Coast Conference to finish fourth in the conference. As the 4-seed in the WCC Tournament the Beavers defeated 5-seed San Francisco in the Quarterfinals before falling 56–65 to top-seeded Gonzaga in the Semifinals to end their season. On February 26, the Beavers announced that head coach Wayne Tinkle would not be retained following the season. The school offered Tinkle the opportunity to finish coaching the season, which he accepted. Two days after the conclusion of the season, on March 11 the Beavers hired Michigan assistant coach Justin Joyner as the program's new head coach.

== Offseason ==
=== Departures ===
Oregon State Beavers departures
Name	Number	Pos.	Height	Weight	Year	Hometown	Reason for departure
Dez White	0	G	6'2"	180	Junior	Jefferson City, MO	Transferred to Temple
Ja'Quavis Williford	1	G	6'7"	190	Sophomore	Tampa, FL	Transferred to Florida A&M
Malcolm Christie	3	G	6'5"	200	Senior	Fredericton, NB, Canada	Out of eligibility
Yaak Yaak	4	C	6'11"	230	Junior	Adelaide, Australia	Transferred to Oklahoma
Kaan Yarkut	6	F	6'6"	210	Sophomore	Ankara, Turkey	Entered transfer portal
Keziah Ekissi	7	G	6'3"	210	Freshman	Saintes-Maries-de-la-Mer, France	Transferred to Cal State Northridge
Gavin Marrs	8	F	7'0"	215	Junior	Ellensburg, WA	Transferred to Saint Joseph's
Stephen Olowoniyi	12	F	6'8"	210	Junior	Melbourne, Australia	Transferred to Duquesne
Isaiah Sy	13	F	6'7"	200	Junior	Marseilles, France	Transferred to San Diego State
Johan Munch	24	F	6'11"	222	Sophomore	Copenhagen, Denmark	Transferred to SMU
Matija Samar	26	G	6'6"	190	Freshman	Jesenice, Slovenia	Transferred to Kansas City
Jorge Diaz Graham	30	F	6'11"	205	Senior	Canary Islands, Spain	Out of eligibility
Olavi Suutela	37	F	6'10"	220	Freshman	Helsinki, Finland	Transferred to UC San Diego
Noah Amenhauser	40	C	7'2"	270	Junior	Goodyear, AZ	Transferred to Long Beach State

=== Incoming transfers ===
Oregon State Beavers incoming transfers
Name	Number	Pos.	Height	Weight	Year	Hometown	Previous School
Daniel Freitag	5	G	6'2"	192	Junior	Bloomington, MN	Buffalo
Peteris Pinnis	6	F	7'2"	297	Sophomore	Salaspils, Latvia	Providence
Kahu Treacher	7	F	6'9"	221	Junior	Hastings, New Zealand	Eastern Arizona College
Dennis Evans	11	C	7'0"	231	(redshirt) Junior	Riverside, CA	Grand Canyon
Jackson Rasmussen	12	F	6'8"	220	Sophomore	Meridian, ID	Idaho
Legend Smiley	13	G	6'5"	188	Sophomore	Seattle, WA	San Francisco
Chris Johnson	22	G	6'3"	189	Senior	Houston, TX	UCF
Sean Blakely Drummond	28	G/F	6'6"	202	Sophomore	Palo Alto, CA	San Francisco
Xavion Staton	32	C	7'1"	224	Sophomore	Las Vegas, NV	BYU
DeShawn Gory	35	F	6'5"	169	Sophomore	Victorville, CA	Fresno State

=== 2026 recruiting class ===
College recruiting
Name	Hometown	School	Height	Weight	Commit date
Yabi Aklog; C	Sammamish, WA	Eastside Catholic School	6 ft 10 in (2.08 m)	232 lb (105 kg)	Apr 5, 2026
Yabi Aklog; C	Recruit ratings: Rivals: 247Sports: ESPN: (81)				
Jemai Lake; PG	Tualatin, OR	Tualatin HS	6 ft 2 in (1.88 m)	160 lb (73 kg)	Apr 24, 2026
Jemai Lake; PG	Recruit ratings: Rivals: 247Sports: ESPN: (NR)				
Overall recruit ranking: Scout: – Rivals: –
Note: In many cases, Scout, Rivals, 247Sports, On3, and ESPN may conflict in their listings of height and weight.; In these cases, the average was taken. ESPN grades are on a 100-point scale.; Sources: "2026 Oregon State Basketball Recruiting Commits". Scout.; "Scout.com Team Recruiting Rankings". Scout.; "2026 Team Ranking". Rivals.

== Roster ==
2026–27 Oregon State Beavers men's basketball team
Players
Coaches

Pos.	#	Name	Height	Weight	Year	Previous school	Hometown
G	1	Jemai Lake	6 ft 2 in (1.88 m)	160 lb (73 kg)	Fr	Tualatin HS	Tualatin, Oregon
G	2	Josiah Lake II	6 ft 2 in (1.88 m)	190 lb (86 kg)	Sr	Tualatin HS	Tualatin, Oregon
G	5	Daniel Freitag	6 ft 2 in (1.88 m)	192 lb (87 kg)	Jr	Buffalo	Bloomington, Minnesota
F	6	Peteris Pinnis	7 ft 2 in (2.18 m)	297 lb (135 kg)	So	Providence	Salaspils, Latvia
F	7	Kahu Treacher	6 ft 9 in (2.06 m)	221 lb (100 kg)	Jr	Eastern Arizona College	Hastings, New Zealand
C	11	Dennis Evans	7 ft 0 in (2.13 m)	231 lb (105 kg)	RS Jr	Grand Canyon	Riverside, California
F	12	Jackson Rasmussen	6 ft 8 in (2.03 m)	220 lb (100 kg)	So	Idaho	Meridian, Idaho
G	13	Legend Smiley	6 ft 5 in (1.96 m)	188 lb (85 kg)	So	San Francisco	Seattle, Washington
C	15	Yabi Aklog	6 ft 11 in (2.11 m)	—	Fr	Eastside Catholic School	Seattle, Washington
G	22	Chris Johnson	6 ft 3 in (1.91 m)	189 lb (86 kg)	Sr	UCF	Houston, Texas
G/F	28	Sean Blakely Drummond	6 ft 6 in (1.98 m)	202 lb (92 kg)	So	San Francisco	Palo Alto, California
C	32	Xavion Staton	7 ft 1 in (2.16 m)	224 lb (102 kg)	So	BYU	Las Vegas, Nevada
F	35	DeShawn Gory	6 ft 5 in (1.96 m)	169 lb (77 kg)	So	Fresno State	Victorville, California

Head coach

- Justin Joyner (UC Santa Barbara)

Assistant coach(es)

- Michael Plank (Willamette)
- Danny Yoshikawa (UC Davis)
- Justin Argenal (Chico State)
- Dominic Lippi (Whitman)
- Alex Peavler (Florida Gulf Coast)

Legend

- (C) Team captain
- (S) Suspended
- (I) Ineligible
- (W) Walk-on
- Injured
- Current redshirt

Roster

== Schedule and results ==
The 2026–27 Beavers team was the first team to start with a 5–0 record since the 1986–87 team and Justin Joyner became the first Beavers coach to start 5–0 since Howard Ray did so for the 1916–17 Beavers. By defeating the Oregon Ducks in a rivalry game on November 19, 2026, the team got off to the best start (6–0) since the 1980–81 Beavers (who started 26–0).

Date time, TV	Rank^{#}	Opponent^{#}	Result	Record	High points	High rebounds	High assists	Site (attendance) city, state
Canada Exhibition Tour
August 18, 2026*; 7:00 p.m., Canada West TV		at Trinity Western	W 113–77	—	19 – Rasmussen	9 – Gory	5 – Tied	David Enarson Gymnasium (260); Langley, BC, Canada
August 20, 2026*; 5:00 p.m.		at Victoria	W 104–70	—	24 – C. Johnson	7 – Tied	6 – Freitag	CARSA (750); Victoria, BC, Canada
August 22, 2026*; 1:00 p.m.		at Victoria	W 92–88	—	24 – Freitag	9 – Gory	2 – Tied	CARSA (625); Victoria, BC, Canada
Exhibition
October 16, 2026*; 4:00 p.m., B1G+		at Michigan	L 93–98	—	20 – Gory	9 – Staton	5 – Freitag	Crisler Center (10,091); Ann Arbor, MI
October 24, 2026*; 7:00 p.m.		California	W 89–76	—	17 – Freitag	11 – Staton	9 – Gory	Gill Coliseum; Corvallis, OR
Non-conference regular season
November 2, 2026*; 6:30 p.m., Pac-12 YouTube		Weber State	W 102–61	1–0	23 – Freitag	13 – Staton	5 – Lake II	Gill Coliseum (3,546); Corvallis, OR
November 6, 2026*; 6:30 p.m., Pac-12 YouTube		California Baptist	W 96–68	2–0	21 – Smiley	6 – Staton	5 – Staton	Gill Coliseum (3,120); Corvallis, OR
November 9, 2026*; 6:30 p.m., YouTube		Eastern Washington	W 94–84	3–0	21 – Freitag	13 – Staton	5 – Freitag	Gill Coliseum (2,636); Corvallis, OR
November 13, 2026*; 6:30 p.m., Pac-12 YouTube		Mississippi Valley State	W 81–65	4–0	18 – Smiley	8 – Evans	6 – Lake II	Gill Coliseum (2,992); Corvallis, OR
November 16, 2026*; 6:30 p.m., Pac-12 YouTube		East Texas A&M	W 109–71	5–0	23 – Freitag	7 – Tied	6 – Gory	Gill Coliseum (2,426); Corvallis, OR
November 19, 2026*; 6:00 p.m., BTN		vs. Oregon; Rivalry	W 82–71	6–0	21 – Smiley	7 – Staton	25 – Lake II	Moda Center (5,607); Portland, OR
November 23, 2026*; 11:00 a.m., FloSports		vs. Tulsa; Acrisure Series Pod 3						Acrisure Arena; Thousand Palms, California
November 24, 2026*; 11:00 a.m., CBSSN		vs. San Francisco; Acrisure Series Pod 3						Acrisure Arena; Thousand Palms, CA
November 29, 2026*; 11:00 a.m., USA		Milwaukee						Gill Coliseum; Corvallis, OR
December 5, 2026*; 5:30 p.m., The CW		Southern Miss						Gill Coliseum; Corvallis, OR
December 11, 2026*; 6:30 p.m., TBD		Lamar						Gill Coliseum; Corvallis, OR
December 14, 2026*; 7:00 p.m., CBSSN		Arizona State						Gill Coliseum; Corvallis, OR
December 17, 2026*; 6:30 p.m., TBD		Cleveland State						Gill Coliseum; Corvallis, OR
December 21, 2026*; TBD, TBD		vs. New Mexico; SoCal Basketball Invitational						The Pavilion at JSerra; San Juan Capistrano, CA
December 23, 2026*; 3:00 p.m., USA		vs. Santa Clara; SoCal Basketball Invitational						The Pavilion at JSerra; San Juan Capistrano, CA
December 30, 2026*; 7:00 p.m., USA		Western Oregon						Gill Coliseum; Corvallis, OR
Pac-12 regular season
January 6, 2027; 7:00 p.m., USA		San Diego State						Gill Coliseum; Corvallis, OR
January 9, 2027; 6:00 p.m., The CW		at Boise State						ExtraMile Arena; Boise, ID
January 14, 2027; 4:00 p.m., USA		at Texas State						Strahan Arena; San Marcos, TX
January 16, 2027; 3:45 p.m., The CW		Utah State						Gill Coliseum; Corvallis, OR
January 24, 2027; 11:00 a.m./1:00 p.m., USA		Gonzaga						Gill Coliseum; Corvallis, OR
January 27, 2027; 7:00 p.m., The CW		at Washington State						Beasley Coliseum; Pullman, WA
January 30, 2027; 1:45 p.m., The CW		at Utah State						Smith Spectrum; Logan, UT
February 4, 2027; 8:00 p.m., USA		Boise State						Gill Coliseum; Corvallis, OR
February 6, 2027; 1:30 p.m., USA		at Colorado State						Moby Arena; Fort Collins, CO
February 10, 2027; 7:00/8:00 p.m., USA		Washington State						Gill Coliseum; Corvallis, OR
February 14, 2027; 12:30 p.m., The CW		Texas State						Gill Coliseum; Corvallis, OR
February 20, 2027; 7:30 p.m., The CW		at Fresno State						Save Mart Center; Fresno, CA
February 25, 2027; 7:30 p.m., CBSSN		at San Diego State						Viejas Arena; San Diego, CA
February 27, 2027; 7:15 p.m., The CW		Colorado State						Gill Coliseum; Corvallis, OR
March 3, 2027; 6:00 p.m., The CW		at Gonzaga						McCarthey Athletic Center; Spokane, WA
March 6, 2027; 3:30 p.m., USA		Fresno State						Gill Coliseum; Corvallis, OR
Pac-12 tournament
March, 2027; TBD, TBD		vs. TBD						MGM Grand Garden Arena; Paradise, NV
*Non-conference game. ^{#}Rankings from AP Poll. (#) Tournament seedings in parentheses. All times are in Pacific Time.
