= 2026–27 Fresno State Bulldogs men's basketball team =

American college basketball season

2026–27 Fresno State Bulldogs men's basketball
- Conference: Pac-12 Conference
- Record: 3–2 (0–0 Pac-12)
- Head coach: Vance Walberg (3rd season)
- Associate head coach: John Welch (3rd season)
- Assistant coaches: Ray Barefield (3rd season); Chris Stahowski (3rd season); Tory Stamps (2nd season)
- Home arena: Save Mart Center (Capacity: 15,596)

2026–27 Pac-12 Conference men's basketball standings
	Conf.				Overall
Team	W		L	PCT	W		L	PCT
Texas State	0	–	0	–	6	–	0	1.000
Oregon State	0	–	0	–	5	–	0	1.000
San Diego State	0	–	0	–	5	–	0	1.000
Utah State	0	–	0	–	5	–	0	1.000
Colorado State	0	–	0	–	4	–	1	.800
Boise State	0	–	0	–	3	–	1	.750
No. 22 Gonzaga	0	–	0	–	3	–	1	.750
Fresno State	0	–	0	–	3	–	2	.600
Washington State	0	–	0	–	2	–	3	.400
† 2027 Pac-12 Tournament winner As of November 20, 2026; Rankings from AP poll

The 2026–27 Fresno State Bulldogs men's basketball team will represent California State University, Fresno during the 2026–27 NCAA Division I men's basketball season. The Bulldogs will be led by third-year head coach Vance Walberg and will play their home games at the Save Mart Center in Fresno, California as a member of the Pac-12 Conference. This will mark Fresno State's first season as members of the Pac-12 Conference after spending the previous fourteen seasons as members of the Mountain West Conference.

== Previous season ==
Fresno State finished the 2025-26 season 13–19, 7–13 in the Mountain West Conference to finish tenth in the conference. As the 10-seed in the Mountain West Tournament the Bulldogs were defeated by 7-seed Colorado State 63–67 in the First round to end their season.

== Offseason ==
=== Departures ===
Fresno State Bulldogs departures
Name	Number	Pos.	Height	Weight	Year	Hometown	Reason for departure
Troy Jenkins	1	G	6'4"	180	(redshirt) Freshman	Newport Beach, CA	Transferred to Cal State Fullerton
Jake Heidbreder	3	G	6'5"	185	(redshirt) Senior	Floyds Knobs, IN	Out of eligibility
Cameron Faas	4	G/F	6'7"	212	Senior	Scottsdale, AZ	Out of eligibility
Makhan Diouf	5	G	6'11"	217	(redshirt) Freshman	Dakar, Senegal	Transferred to Lindenwood
Aram Soqui Urbano	7	G	6'4"	185	Freshman	Rosarito, BC, Mexico	Transferred to Merrimack
Gasper Kocevar	9	C	6'10"	229	Freshman	Novo Mesto, Slovenia	Transferred to Howard
Zaon Collins	10	G	6'1"	180	Junior	Las Vegas, NV	Transferred to Ball State
Jac Mani	11	F	6'9"	243	Junior	Beverly Hills, CA	Transferred to Tarleton State
David Douglas Jr.	15	G	6'5"	208	Junior	Park Forest, IL	Transferred to Northern Illinois
Wilson Jacques	16	C	7'0"	264	Freshman	Metz, France	Transferred to DePaul
Matteo Porto	17	G	6'7"	210	Freshman	Rome, Italy	Entered transfer portal
Bastien Rieber	21	G	6'2"	164	Freshman	Riedisheim, France	Transferred to Niagara
DeShawn Gory	35	F	6'6"	165	Freshman	Victorville, CA	Transferred to Oregon State

=== Incoming transfers ===
Fresno State Bulldogs incoming transfers
Name	Number	Pos.	Height	Weight	Year	Hometown	Previous School
Brian Amuneke	1	G	6'6"	-	Junior	Los Angeles, CA	Wichita State
Quentin Grimes	5	G	6'6"	-	(redshirt) Freshman	Las Vegas, NV	Nebraska
KJ Perry	7	G	6'3"	-	(redshirt) Sophomore	Detroit, MI	BYU
Ross Candelino	30	G	6'5"	-	Graduate	Jacksonville, FL	Lipscomb
Baye Fall	35	C	6'11"	-	Senior	Guédiawaye, Senegal	Rutgers
Bradey Henige	42	F	7'0"	-	Junior	Glendale, AZ	Cal Baptist
Dragos Lungu	77	G	6'6"	-	(redshirt) Junior	Cluj-Napoca, Romania	UT Martin

=== 2026 recruiting class ===
College recruiting
Name	Hometown	School	Height	Weight	Commit date
Roger Fabrega Urpina; PF	Calella de Palafrugell, Spain	Amics Castelló (Spain)	6 ft 1 in (1.85 m)	N/A	Jun 3, 2026
Roger Fabrega Urpina; PF	Recruit ratings: 247Sports: ESPN: (NR)				
Anthony Granger; PF	Phoenix, AZ	PHH Prep	6 ft 8 in (2.03 m)	N/A	Feb 22, 2026
Anthony Granger; PF	Recruit ratings: Rivals: 247Sports: ESPN: (NR)				
Yeshua Kesse-Beda; SF	Castaic, CA	SoCal Academy	6 ft 7 in (2.01 m)	205 lb (93 kg)	Apr 16, 2026
Yeshua Kesse-Beda; SF	Recruit ratings: Rivals: 247Sports: ESPN: (NR)				
Rylan Parsley; SF	Glendale, AZ	Sandra Day O'Connor HS	6 ft 7 in (2.01 m)	180 lb (82 kg)	Apr 20, 2026
Rylan Parsley; SF	Recruit ratings: Rivals: 247Sports: ESPN: (NR)				
Colin Schroeder; F	Weyhe, Germany	EWE Baskets Oldenburg (Germany)	6 ft 8 in (2.03 m)	N/A	Jun 4, 2026
Colin Schroeder; F	Recruit ratings: 247Sports: ESPN: (NR)				
Marko Vuckovic; C	Novi Sad, Serbia	Dynamic Balkan Bet (Serbia)	6 ft 8 in (2.03 m)	N/A	May 4, 2026
Marko Vuckovic; C	Recruit ratings: 247Sports: ESPN: (NR)				
Overall recruit ranking: Scout: – Rivals: –
Note: In many cases, Scout, Rivals, 247Sports, On3, and ESPN may conflict in their listings of height and weight.; In these cases, the average was taken. ESPN grades are on a 100-point scale.; Sources: "2026 Fresno State Basketball Recruiting Commits". Scout.; "Scout.com Team Recruiting Rankings". Scout.; "2026 Team Ranking". Rivals.

== Roster ==
2026–27 Fresno State Bulldogs men's basketball team
Players
Coaches

Pos.	#	Name	Height	Weight	Year	Previous school	Hometown
F	0	Rylan Parsley	6 ft 7 in (2.01 m)	—	Fr	Sandra Day O'Connor HS	Glendale, Arizona
G	1	Brian Amuneke	6 ft 6 in (1.98 m)	—	Jr	Wichita State	Los Angeles, California
F	4	Yeshua Kesse-Beda	6 ft 7 in (2.01 m)	—	Fr	SoCal Academy	Los Angeles, California
G	5	Quentin Grimes	6 ft 6 in (1.98 m)	—	RS Fr	Nebraska	Las Vegas, Nevada
G	6	DJ Stickman	6 ft 2 in (1.88 m)	—	So	Clovis West HS	Fresno, California
G	7	KJ Perry	6 ft 3 in (1.91 m)	—	RS So	BYU	Detroit, Michigan
F	8	Anthony Granger	6 ft 8 in (2.03 m)	—	Fr	PHH Prep	Wichita, Kansas
G	10	Roger Fabrega Urpina	6 ft 1 in (1.85 m)	—	Fr	TAU Castelló	Calella de Palafrugell, Spain
F/C	11	Marko Vuckovic	6 ft 8 in (2.03 m)	—	Fr	Dynamic Balkan Bet	Novi Sad, Serbia
F	28	Colin Schroeder	6 ft 8 in (2.03 m)	—	Fr	EWE Baskets Oldenburg	Weyhe, Germany
G	30	Ross Candelino	6 ft 5 in (1.96 m)	—	GS	Lipscomb	Jacksonville, Florida
C	35	Baye Fall	6 ft 11 in (2.11 m)	—	Sr	Rutgers	Guédiawaye, Senegal
F	42	Bradey Henige	7 ft 0 in (2.13 m)	—	Jr	Cal Baptist	Glendale, Arizona
G	77	Dragos Lungu	6 ft 6 in (1.98 m)	—	RS Jr	UT Martin	Cluj-Napoca, Romania
G	80	Nathan Zulemie	6 ft 4 in (1.93 m)	203 lb (92 kg)	So	Nanterre 92	Nanterre, France

Head coach

- Vance Walberg (Cal State Bakersfield)

Assistant coach(es)

- John Welch (UNLV)
- Ray Barefield (San Diego State)
- Tory Stamps (Evangel University)

Legend

- (C) Team captain
- (S) Suspended
- (I) Ineligible
- (W) Walk-on
- Injured
- Current redshirt

Roster

== Schedule and results ==
Date time, TV	Rank^{#}	Opponent^{#}	Result	Record	High points	High rebounds	High assists	Site (attendance) city, state
Exhibition
October 24, 2026*; 2:00 p.m., TBD		Cal State Fullerton	L 78–96		19 – Amuneke	9 – Amuneke	8 – Fabrega Urpina	Save Mart Center; Fresno, CA
Non-conference regular season
November 2, 2026*; 6:00 p.m., Pac-12 YouTube		Fresno Pacific	W 88–79	1–0	30 – Lungu	8 – Candelino	4 – Fabrega Urpina	Save Mart Center (2,595); Fresno, CA
November 7, 2026*; 7:00 p.m., ESPN+		at UC San Diego	L 65–81	1–1	18 – Tied	13 – Henige	7 – Fabrega Urpina	LionTree Arena (3,669); La Jolla, CA
November 10, 2026*; 6:00 p.m., Pac-12 YouTube		Georgia State	W 95–92 ^{OT}	2–1	27 – Amuneke	11 – Lungu	12 – Fabrega Urpina	Save Mart Center (2,754); Fresno, CA
November 14, 2026*; 3:00 p.m., Pac-12 YouTube		UC Riverside	W 89–80	3–1	21 – Tied	9 – Henige	8 – Fabrega Urpina	Save Mart Center (2,783); Fresno, CA
November 18, 2026*; 6:00 p.m., MW+		at San Jose State; Battle for the Valley	L 86–92	3–2	21 – Candelino	8 – Henige	12 – Fabrega Urpina	Provident Credit Union Event Center (2,808); San Jose, CA
November 20, 2026*; 7:00 p.m., Pac-12 YouTube		Alabama State						Save Mart Center; Fresno, CA
November 27, 2026*; 11:00 a.m., TBD		vs. South Alabama; Second Line Showcase						Convocation Center; New Orleans, LA
November 29, 2026*; 2:30 p.m., TBD		vs. South Dakota State; Second Line Showcase						Convocation Center; New Orleans, LA
December 2, 2026*; 7:00 p.m., ESPN+		at Santa Clara						Leavey Center; Santa Clara, CA
December 5, 2026*; 11:30 a.m., USA		Southern						Save Mart Center; Fresno, CA
December 9, 2026*; 6:00 p.m., Pac-12 YouTube		Cal State Northridge						Save Mart Center; Fresno, CA
December 12, 2026*; 1:30 p.m., USA		San Francisco						Save Mart Center; Fresno, CA
December 19, 2026*; 1:30 p.m., USA		Sacramento State						Save Mart Center; Fresno, CA
December 22, 2026*; 4:00 p.m., Pac-12 YouTube		UC Santa Barbara						Save Mart Center; Fresno, CA
December 29, 2026*; 7:00 p.m., ESPN+		at UC Irvine						Bren Events Center; Irvine, CA
Pac-12 regular season
January 3, 2027; 1:00 p.m., The CW		Washington State						Save Mart Center; Fresno, CA
January 9, 2027; 7:30 p.m., CBSSN		at San Diego State						Viejas Arena; San Diego, CA
January 13, 2027; 8:00 p.m., CBSSN		Gonzaga						Save Mart Center; Fresno, CA
January 17, 2027; 11:00 a.m., USA		at Colorado State						Moby Arena; Fort Collins, CO
January 20, 2027; 6:00 p.m., CBSSN		Boise State						Save Mart Center; Fresno, CA
January 23, 2027; 1:30 p.m., USA		Texas State						Save Mart Center; Fresno, CA
January 27, 2027; 7:00 p.m., USA		at Gonzaga						McCarthey Athletic Center; Spokane, WA
January 30, 2027; 5:30 p.m., USA		at Washington State						Beasley Coliseum; Pullman, WA
February 4, 2027; TBD, The CW		Colorado State						Save Mart Center; Fresno, CA
February 6, 2027; 3:45 p.m., The CW		Utah State						Save Mart Center; Fresno, CA
February 13, 2027; 1:00 p.m., USA		at Boise State						ExtraMile Arena; Boise, ID
February 18, 2027; 5:00 p.m., USA		at Texas State						Strahan Arena; San Marcos, TX
February 20, 2027; 7:30 p.m., The CW		Oregon State						Save Mart Center; Fresno, CA
February 27, 2027; 3:30 p.m., USA		at Utah State						Smith Spectrum; Logan, UT
March 3, 2027; 7:00 p.m., USA		San Diego State						Save Mart Center; Fresno, CA
March 6, 2027; 3:30 p.m., USA		at Oregon State						Gill Coliseum; Corvallis, OR
Pac-12 tournament
March, 2027; TBD, TBD		vs. TBD						MGM Grand Garden Arena; Paradise, NV
*Non-conference game. ^{#}Rankings from AP Poll. (#) Tournament seedings in parentheses. All times are in Pacific Time.
