= 2026–27 San Diego State Aztecs men's basketball team =

American college basketball season

2026–27 San Diego State Aztecs men's basketball
- Conference: Pac-12 Conference
- Record: 5–0 (0–0 Pac-12)
- Head coach: Brian Dutcher (10th season)
- Assistant coaches: Dave Velasquez (14th season); JayDee Luster (6th season); Ryan Badrtalei (3rd season)
- Offensive scheme: Wheel
- Base defense: Pack-Line
- Home arena: Viejas Arena (Capacity: 12,414)

2026–27 Pac-12 Conference men's basketball standings
	Conf.				Overall
Team	W		L	PCT	W		L	PCT
Oregon State	0	–	0	–	6	–	0	1.000
Texas State	0	–	0	–	6	–	0	1.000
San Diego State	0	–	0	–	5	–	0	1.000
Utah State	0	–	0	–	5	–	0	1.000
Colorado State	0	–	0	–	4	–	1	.800
No. 22 Gonzaga	0	–	0	–	3	–	1	.750
Fresno State	0	–	0	–	4	–	2	.667
Boise State	0	–	0	–	3	–	2	.600
Washington State	0	–	0	–	2	–	3	.400
† 2027 Pac-12 Tournament winner As of November 21, 2026; Rankings from AP poll

The 2026–27 San Diego State Aztecs men's basketball team represents San Diego State University during the 2026–27 NCAA Division I men's basketball season. The Aztecs, led by tenth-year head coach Brian Dutcher, play their home games at Viejas Arena in San Diego, California as new members of the Pac-12 Conference.

== Previous season ==
The Aztecs finished the 2025–26 season 22–11, 14–6 in Mountain West play to finish in second place. As the 2nd seed in the Mountain West Tournament they defeated Colorado State and New Mexico in the quarterfinals and semifinals before losing in the championship game to Utah State.

Following the team's loss in the Mountain West tournament championship game, the team announced that they declined a bid to participate in the NIT.

This season was San Diego State's last as a member of the Mountain West Conference, as it joined the newly reformed Pac-12 Conference on July 1, 2026.

== Offseason ==
=== Departures ===
San Diego State departures
Name	Num	Pos.	Height	Weight	Year	Hometown	Reason for departure
Magoon Gwath	0	F	7'0"	212	(redshirt) Sophomore	Euless, TX	Transferred to DePaul
Sean Newman Jr.	4	G	6'1"	174	(redshirt) Senior	Los Angeles, CA	Graduated
Pharaoh Compton	5	F	6'7"	230	Sophomore	Chicago, IL	Transferred to Oregon
Cam Lawin	7	G	6'3"	181	(redshirt) Junior	Chicago, IL	Walk-on; not on team roster
BJ Davis	10	G	6'2"	175	Junior	Modesto, CA	Transferred to Creighton
Miles Byrd	21	G	6'6"	190	(redshirt) Junior	Stockton, CA	Transferred to Providence
Taj DeGourville	24	G	6'5"	211	Sophomore	Las Vegas, NV	Transferred to Nebraska
Jeremiah Oden	25	F	6'8"	210	(redshirt) Senior	Chicago, IL	Graduated
Reese Dixon-Waters	39	G	6'5"	217	(redshirt) Senior	Long Beach, CA	Graduated
Miles Heide	40	F	6'9"	235	Junior	North Bend, WA	Transferred to Virginia Tech

=== Incoming transfers ===
San Diego State incoming transfers
Name	Num	Pos.	Height	Weight	Year	Hometown	Previous school
Chance Gladden	2	G	6'4"	185	Sophomore	Raleigh, NC	Boston University
Isaiah Sy	13	F	6'7"	200	Senior	Marseille, France	Oregon State
Nick Anderson	23	G/F	6'3"	195	Graduate Student	Houston, TX	Rice
Jeremiah Chery	45	F	6'11"	250	Graduate Student	San Diego, CA	Sacramento State

=== 2026 recruiting class ===
College recruiting
Name	Hometown	School	Height	Weight	Commit date
Zach White; SG	Los Angeles, CA	Notre Dame High School	6 ft 4 in (1.93 m)	183 lb (83 kg)	Sep 28, 2025
Zach White; SG	Recruit ratings: 247Sports: ESPN: (NR)				
Overall recruit ranking:
Note: In many cases, Scout, Rivals, 247Sports, On3, and ESPN may conflict in their listings of height and weight.; In these cases, the average was taken. ESPN grades are on a 100-point scale.; Sources: "2026 San Diego St. Basketball Commitment List". Rivals.; "2026 San Diego St. Player Commits". ESPN.; "2026 Team Ranking". Rivals.

== Roster ==
2026–27 San Diego State Aztecs men's basketball team
Players
Coaches

Pos.	#	Name	Height	Weight	Year	Previous school	Hometown
G	0	David Torresani	6 ft 2 in (1.88 m)	185 lb (84 kg)	Fr		Milan, Italy
G	2	Chance Gladden	6 ft 4 in (1.93 m)	185 lb (84 kg)	Fr	Ravenscroft School; Boston University	Raleigh, North Carolina
G	3	Elzie Harrington	6 ft 5 in (1.96 m)	188 lb (85 kg)	So	St. John Bosco	Long Beach, California
G	4	Zach White	6 ft 6 in (1.98 m)	175 lb (79 kg)	Fr	Notre Dame	Sherman Oaks, California
G	5	Latrell Davis	6 ft 3 in (1.91 m)	212 lb (96 kg)	Jr	First Baptist Academy (FL); San Jose State	Leeds, England
F	6	Samson Mashebinu	6 ft 8 in (2.03 m)	190 lb (86 kg)	Fr	NBA Academy	Lagos, Nigeria
F	7	Luka Skorić	6 ft 9 in (2.06 m)	195 lb (88 kg)	Fr		Zagreb, Croatia
F	8	Tae Simmons	6 ft 6 in (1.98 m)	230 lb (104 kg)	So	Heritage Christian (CA)	Simi Valley, California
G	9	Raymar Gonzales (W)	6 ft 3 in (1.91 m)	165 lb (75 kg)	RS So	Eastlake	San Diego, California
F	13	Isaiah Sy	6 ft 7 in (2.01 m)	200 lb (91 kg)	Sr	Combine Academy; Oregon State	Marseille, France
F	18	Luca Vincini	6 ft 9 in (2.06 m)	216 lb (98 kg)	Fr		Turin, Italy
G	23	Nick Anderson (5th)	6 ft 3 in (1.91 m)	195 lb (88 kg)	GS	Clear Creek; Rice	Houston, Texas
F	33	Thokbor Majak	7 ft 1 in (2.16 m)	215 lb (98 kg)	RS So	Dream City Christian	Bor, South Sudan
F	45	Bear Cherry (5th)	6 ft 11 in (2.11 m)	250 lb (113 kg)	GS	Saint Mary's Catholic; Sacramento State	San Diego, California

Head coach

- Brian Dutcher (Minnesota)

Assistant coach(es)

- Dave Velasquez (San Diego State)
- JayDee Luster (Wyoming)
- Ryan Badrtalei (UCLA)
- (5th) Fifth year

Legend

- (C) Team captain
- (S) Suspended
- (I) Ineligible
- (W) Walk-on
- Injured
- Current redshirt

Roster

== Schedule and results ==
Date time, TV	Rank^{#}	Opponent^{#}	Result	Record	High points	High rebounds	High assists	Site (attendance) city, state
Exhibition
October 16, 2026*; 7:00 p.m., ESPN+		at Arizona	L 67–82		17 – Sy	9 – Cherry	4 – Harrington	McKale Center (13,661); Tucson, AZ
October 23, 2026*; 7:00 p.m.		No. 21 USC	L 68–85		19 – Harrington	5 – Davis	4 – Tied	Viejas Arena (8,687); San Diego, CA
October 28, 2026*; 7:00 p.m.		Long Beach State	W 92–67		14 – Davis	7 – Sy	7 – Gladden	Viejas Arena (10,789); San Diego, CA
Non-conference regular season
November 3, 2026*; 7:00 p.m., Pac-12 YouTube		Cal State Fullerton	W 102–78	1–0	25 – Davis	11 – Simmons	8 – Gladden	Viejas Arena (10,677); San Diego, CA
November 7, 2026*; 12:30 p.m., USA		vs. Colorado; Bill Walton Classic	W 77–66	2–0	20 – Gladden	7 – Vicini	3 – Tied	Pechanga Arena (3,432); San Diego, CA
November 11, 2026*; 2:00 p.m., Pac-12 YouTube		Bethune–Cookman	W 88–75	3–0	26 – Davis	7 – Sy	8 – Harrington	Viejas Arena (10,124); San Diego, CA
November 15, 2026*; 1:00 p.m., The CW		vs. New Mexico State; Compete 4 Cause Classic	W 73–61	4–0	12 – Sy	5 – Davis	7 – Gladden	Frontwave Arena (3,370); Oceanside, CA
November 18, 2026*; 7:00 p.m., Pac-12 YouTube		Texas Southern	W 97–51	5–0	20 – Davis	8 – Tied	6 – Harrington	Viejas Arena (10,501); San Diego, CA
November 24, 2026*; 2:30 p.m., ESPNU		vs. Iowa State; Players Era 16 Bracket 1 First Round						Michelob Ultra Arena; Paradise, NV
November 26, 2026*; TBA, ESPN		vs. Tennessee/Maryland; Players Era 16 Bracket 1						Michelob Ultra Arena; Paradise, NV
November 27, 2026*; TBA		vs. TBA; Players Era 16 Bracket 1						Michelob Ultra Arena; Paradise, NV
December 5, 2026*; 1:30 p.m., USA		UNLV						Viejas Arena; San Diego, CA
December 11, 2026*; 7:00 p.m., Pac-12 YouTube		Montana State						Viejas Arena; San Diego, CA
December 19, 2026*; 7:00 p.m., USA		vs. BYU; Acrisure Series						Acrisure Arena; Palm Desert, CA
December 22, 2026*; 3:00 p.m., Pac-12 YouTube		LIU						Viejas Arena; San Diego, CA
December 29, 2026*; 7:00 p.m., FS1		at UCLA						Pauley Pavilion; Los Angeles, CA
December 31, 2026*; 2:00 p.m., Pac-12 YouTube		Life Pacific						Viejas Arena; San Diego, CA
Pac-12 regular season
January 6, 2026; 7:00 p.m., USA		at Oregon State						Gill Coliseum; Corvallis, OR
January 9, 2026; 7:30 p.m., CBSSN		Fresno State						Viejas Arena; San Diego, CA
January 14, 2026; 6:00 p.m., USA		Colorado State						Viejas Arena; San Diego, CA
January 17, 2026; 1:00 p.m., CBSSN		at Washington State						Beasley Coliseum; Pullman, WA
January 20, 2026; 7:00 p.m., USA		Texas State						Viejas Arena; San Diego, CA
January 23, 2026; 7:00 p.m., CBSSN		at Boise State						ExtraMile Arena; Boise, ID
January 30, 2026; 3:30 p.m., USA		at Colorado State						Moby Arena; Fort Collins, CO
February 4, 2026; 6:00 p.m., USA		Utah State						Viejas Arena; San Diego, CA
February 6, 2026; 1:30 p.m., USA		Gonzaga						Viejas Arena; San Diego, CA
February 11, 2026; 5:00 p.m., The CW		at Texas State						Strahan Arena; San Marcos, TX
February 17, 2026; 5:00 p.m., The CW		at Utah State						Smith Spectrum; Logan, UT
February 20, 2026; 1:30 p.m., USA		Washington State						Viejas Arena; San Diego, CA
February 25, 2026; 7:30 p.m., CBSSN		Oregon State						Viejas Arena; San Diego, CA
February 27, 2026; 1:00 p.m., CBS		at Gonzaga						McCarthey Athletic Center; Spokane, WA
March 3, 2026; 7:00 p.m., USA		at Fresno State						Save Mart Center; Fresno, CA
March 6, 2026; 7:30 p.m., USA		Boise State						Viejas Arena; San Diego, CA
Pac-12 Tournament
March 9–13, 2027; TBA		vs.						MGM Grand Garden Arena; Paradise, NV
*Non-conference game. ^{#}Rankings from AP Poll. (#) Tournament seedings in parentheses. All times are in Pacific Time.

== Rankings ==
Ranking movements Legend: — = Not ranked
	Week																				
Poll	Pre	1	2	3	4	5	6	7	8	9	10	11	12	13	14	15	16	17	18	19	Final
AP	—	—	—																		
Coaches	—	—	—																		
