= 2026–27 New Mexico Lobos men's basketball team =

American college basketball season

2026–27 New Mexico Lobos men's basketball
- Conference: Mountain West Conference
- Record: 3–1 (0–0 MW)
- Head coach: Eric Olen (2nd season)
- Assistant coaches: Mikey Howell (2nd season); Mike Roberts (2nd season); Sam Stapleton (2nd season); Tom Tankelewicz (2nd season); Michael Wilder (2nd season)
- Home arena: The Pit (Capacity: 15,411)

2026–27 Mountain West Conference men's basketball standings
| | Conf. | | | | Overall |
| Team | W | | L | PCT | W | | L | PCT |
|---|---|---|---|---|---|---|---|---|
| Grand Canyon | 0 | – | 0 | – | 4 | – | 0 | 1.000 |
| Wyoming | 0 | – | 0 | – | 4 | – | 1 | .800 |
| Hawaii | 0 | – | 0 | – | 3 | – | 1 | .750 |
| New Mexico | 0 | – | 0 | – | 3 | – | 1 | .750 |
| UNLV | 0 | – | 0 | – | 3 | – | 1 | .750 |
| UTEP | 0 | – | 0 | – | 3 | – | 1 | .750 |
| Air Force | 0 | – | 0 | – | 3 | – | 2 | .600 |
| UC Davis | 0 | – | 0 | – | 3 | – | 2 | .600 |
| Nevada | 0 | – | 0 | – | 2 | – | 2 | .500 |
| San Jose State | 0 | – | 0 | – | 2 | – | 2 | .500 |
† 2027 Mountain West tournament winner As of November 19, 2026; Rankings from AP poll

The 2026–27 New Mexico Lobos men's basketball team will represent the University of New Mexico during the 2026–27 NCAA Division I men's basketball season. The Lobos, led by second-year head coach Eric Olen, will play their home games at The Pit in Albuquerque, New Mexico, as members of the Mountain West Conference.

== Previous season ==
The Lobos finished the 2025–26 season 26–11 overall and 13–7 in Mountain West play, finishing third in the conference standings. As the No. 3 seed in the Mountain West tournament, New Mexico defeated 11th-seeded San Jose State in the quarterfinals before falling to second-seeded San Diego State in the semifinals.

New Mexico received a bid to the National Invitation Tournament, where the Lobos defeated Sam Houston, George Washington and Saint Joseph's to advance to the NIT semifinals. The Lobos' season ended with a 74–69 loss to Tulsa at Hinkle Fieldhouse. The appearance was New Mexico's first trip to the NIT semifinals since 1990.

Following the season, Olen agreed to a new five-year contract that will keep him at New Mexico through the 2030–31 season.

== Offseason ==
=== Departures ===
| Name | Number | Pos. | Height | Weight | Year | Hometown | Reason for departure |
|---|---|---|---|---|---|---|---|
| Kevin Patton Jr. | 0 | G | 6'8" | 200 | Junior | Murrieta, CA | Entered transfer portal |
| Deyton Albury | 1 | G | 6'3" | 190 | (redshirt) Senior | Nassau, Bahamas | Pursued professional career |
| Tajavis Miller | 2 | G | 6'4" | 200 | Senior | Commerce, TX | Pursued professional career |
| Luke Haupt | 3 | G | 6'7" | 215 | (redshirt) Senior | San Diego, CA | Out of eligibility |
| Antonio Chol | 5 | G/F | 6'9" | 215 | (redshirt) Junior | Buffalo, NY | Transferred to UC Santa Barbara |
| Sir Marius Jones | 7 | G | 6'4" | 195 | Freshman | Oroville, CA | Transferred to Weber State |
| Tomislav Buljan | 10 | F | 6'9" | 250 | Freshman | Split, Croatia | Transferred to Maryland |
| Kallai Patton | 11 | G | 6'4" | 180 | (redshirt) Freshman | Murrieta, CA | Transferred to Bethune–Cookman |
| Timéo Pons | 29 | G | 6'9" | 195 | Freshman | Nanterre, France | Transferred to Abilene Christian |
| Milos Vicentic | 31 | F | 6'7" | 210 | Graduate | Belgrade, Serbia | Out of eligibility |
| JT Rock | 35 | C | 7'1" | 255 | (redshirt) Sophomore | Sioux Falls, SD | Transferred to Kansas State |

=== Incoming transfers ===
| Name | Number | Pos. | Height | Weight | Year | Hometown | Previous school |
|---|---|---|---|---|---|---|---|
| Hudson Mayes | 0 | G | 6'5" | 200 | Sophomore | Los Angeles, CA | UC San Diego |
| Imran Suljanovic | 2 | F | 6'8" | 210 | (redshirt) Freshman | Vienna, Austria | St. John's |
| Federico Grani | 8 | F | 6'10" | 225 | Senior | Treviso, Italy | Moncada Energy Agrigento |
| Rytis Petraitis | 31 | F | 6'7" | 215 | Graduate | Arlington, TX | California |
| Tunde Vahlberg Fasasi | 32 | F | 6'7" | 205 | Senior | Stockholm, Sweden | William & Mary |
| AJ Pierre-Jerome | 40 | F | 6'9" | 210 | Junior | Clermont, FL | Butler CC |

=== 2026 recruiting class ===
| Name | Number | Pos. | Height | Weight | Year | Hometown | Previous school |
|---|---|---|---|---|---|---|---|
| Dax Hall | 3 | G | 6'1" | | Freshman | Carlsbad, CA | Santa Fe Christian HS |
| Benjamin Schuch | 22 | F | 6'9" | | Freshman | Vienna, Austria | Zentro San Jorge Basket Madrid |
| Fynn Lastring | 25 | F | 6'10" | | Freshman | Bochum, Germany | RASTA Vechta |

== Roster ==
2026–27 New Mexico Lobos men's basketball team
Players
Coaches

| Pos. | # | Name | Height | Weight | Year | Previous school | Hometown |
|---|---|---|---|---|---|---|---|
| G | 0 | Hudson Mayes | 6 ft 5 in (1.96 m) | 200 lb (91 kg) | So | UC San Diego | Los Angeles, California |
| G | 1 | Uriah Tenette | 5 ft 11 in (1.8 m) | 165 lb (75 kg) | So | Prescott HS | North Highlands, California |
| F | 2 | Imran Suljanovic | 6 ft 8 in (2.03 m) | 210 lb (95 kg) | RS Fr | St. John's | Vienna, Austria |
| G | 3 | Dax Hall | 6 ft 1 in (1.85 m) | — | Fr | Santa Fe Christian HS | Carlsbad, California |
| G | 5 | Chris Howell | 6 ft 6 in (1.98 m) | 215 lb (98 kg) | GS | UC San Diego | San Diego, California |
| F | 8 | Federico Grani | 6 ft 9 in (2.06 m) | — | Sr | Moncada Energy Agrigento | Treviso, Italy |
| F | 22 | Benjamin Schuch | 6 ft 9 in (2.06 m) | — | Fr | Zentro San Jorge Basket Madrid | Vienna, Austria |
| G | 23 | Jake Hall | 6 ft 4 in (1.93 m) | 200 lb (91 kg) | So | Carlsbad HS | Carlsbad, California |
| F | 25 | Fynn Lastring | 6 ft 10 in (2.08 m) | — | Fr | RASTA Vechta | Bochum, Germany |
| F | 31 | Rytis Petraitis | 6 ft 7 in (2.01 m) | 215 lb (98 kg) | GS | California | Arlington, Texas |
| F | 32 | Tunde Vahlberg Fasasi | 6 ft 7 in (2.01 m) | 205 lb (93 kg) | Sr | William & Mary | Stockholm, Sweden |
| F | 40 | AJ Pierre-Jerome | 6 ft 9 in (2.06 m) | 210 lb (95 kg) | Jr | Butler CC | Clermont, Florida |

Head coach

- Eric Olen (Spring Hill)

Assistant coach(es)

- Mikey Howell (UC San Diego)
- Mike Roberts (Indiana)
- Sam Stapleton (Occidental)
- Tom Tankelewicz (Western Carolina)
- Michael Wilder (UC Irvine)

Legend

- (C) Team captain
- (S) Suspended
- (I) Ineligible
- (W) Walk-on
- Injured
- Current redshirt

Roster
Last update: September 1, 2026

== Schedule and results ==
| Date time, TV | Rank^{#} | Opponent^{#} | Result | Record | High points | High rebounds | High assists | Site (attendance) city, state |
Exhibition
| October 11, 2026*; 1:00 p.m. | | at Oklahoma State | W 99–89 | | 31 – J. Hall | 7 – Mayes | 3 – Tied | Gallagher-Iba Arena; Stillwater, OK |
| October 18, 2026*; 1:00 p.m., MW+ | | Washington State; Power Ford Tip-Off Series | W 92–64 | | 22 – J. Hall | 9 – Howell | 5 – Tenette | The Pit (6,168); Albuquerque, NM |
| October 25, 2026*; 2:00 p.m., MW+ | | Arizona State; Power Ford Tip-Off Series | L 86–91 | | 19 – J. Hall | 10 – Mayes | 4 – D. Hall | The Pit (7,447); Albuquerque, NM |
Non-conference regular season
| November 2, 2026*; 7:00 p.m., MW+ | | Utah Tech | W 100–60 | 1–0 | 30 – J. Hall | 9 – Schuch | 4 – Tied | The Pit (10,858); Albuquerque, NM |
| November 7, 2026*; 4:00 p.m., MW+ | | Northern Arizona | W 94–65 | 2–0 | 23 – J. Hall | 7 – Mayes | 9 – Howell | The Pit (11,861); Albuquerque, NM |
| November 10, 2026*; 7:00 p.m., MW+ | | Little Rock | W 94–69 | 3–0 | 39 – J. Hall | 7 – Schuch | 5 – Tied | The Pit (11,078); Albuquerque, NM |
| November 14, 2026*; 8:00 p.m., ESPN+ | | at Santa Clara | L 85–90 | 3–1 | 24 – Mayes | 12 – Mayes | 3 – J. Hall | Leavey Center (2,211); Santa Clara, CA |
| November 21, 2026*; 12:00 p.m. | | at Wichita State | | | | | | Charles Koch Arena; Wichita, KS |
| November 25, 2026*; 7:00 p.m., MW+ | | Mississippi Valley State | | | | | | The Pit; Albuquerque, NM |
| November 29, 2026*; 12:00 p.m., The CW | | Utah State | | | | | | The Pit; Albuquerque, NM |
| December 5, 2026*; 12:15 p.m., The CW | | New Mexico State; Rio Grande Rivalry | | | | | | The Pit; Albuquerque, NM |
| December 12, 2026*; 4:30 p.m., CBSSN | | Saint Mary's | | | | | | The Pit; Albuquerque, NM |
| December 15, 2026*; 7:00 p.m., MW+ | | Mercer | | | | | | The Pit; Albuquerque, NM |
| December 18, 2026*; 8:00 p.m. | | at UC Irvine | | | | | | Bren Events Center; Irvine, CA |
| December 21, 2026*; 4:00 p.m. | | vs. Oregon State; Capistrano Invitational | | | | | | The Pavilion at JSerra; San Juan Capistrano, California |
| December 23, 2026*; 1:30 p.m. | | vs. Boise State; Capistrano Invitational | | | | | | The Pavilion at JSerra; San Juan Capistrano, CA |
| December 29, 2026*; 7:00 p.m., MW+ | | Northern New Mexico | | | | | | The Pit; Albuquerque, NM |
Mountain West regular season
| January 2, 2027; 6:00 p.m., FS1 | | at UTEP | | | | | | Don Haskins Center; El Paso, TX |
| January 5, 2027; 8:00 p.m., CBSSN | | Nevada | | | | | | The Pit; Albuquerque, NM |
| January 9, 2027; 4:45 p.m., The CW | | UC Davis | | | | | | The Pit; Albuquerque, NM |
| January 12, 2027; 8:30 p.m., CBSSN | | at UNLV | | | | | | Thomas & Mack Center; Paradise, NV |
| January 16, 2027; 2:30 p.m., The CW | | at Air Force | | | | | | Clune Arena; Colorado Springs, CO |
| January 20, 2027; 9:00 p.m., FS1 | | San Jose State | | | | | | The Pit; Albuquerque, NM |
| January 23, 2027; 2:30 p.m., The CW | | Grand Canyon | | | | | | The Pit; Albuquerque, NM |
| January 26, 2027; 10:00 p.m., FS1 | | at Hawai'i | | | | | | Stan Sheriff Center; Honolulu, HI |
| January 30, 2027; 6:00 p.m., FS1 | | Air Force | | | | | | The Pit; Albuquerque, NM |
| February 2, 2027; 8:00 p.m. | | at San Jose State | | | | | | Provident Credit Union Event Center; San Jose, CA |
| February 6, 2027; 4:30 p.m., CBSSN | | at Grand Canyon | | | | | | Global Credit Union Arena; Phoenix, AZ |
| February 13, 2027; 4:00 p.m., CBSSN | | UNLV | | | | | | The Pit; Albuquerque, NM |
| February 17, 2027; 9:00 p.m., FS1 | | at Wyoming | | | | | | Arena-Auditorium; Laramie, WY |
| February 20, 2027; 8:30 p.m., CBSSN | | UTEP | | | | | | The Pit; Albuquerque, NM |
| February 24, 2027; 6:00 p.m., The CW | | Hawai'i | | | | | | The Pit; Albuquerque, NM |
| February 27, 2027; 5:00 p.m., MW+ | | at UC Davis | | | | | | University Credit Union Center; Davis, CA |
| March 2, 2027; 8:00 p.m., CBSSN | | Wyoming | | | | | | The Pit; Albuquerque, NM |
| March 5, 2027; 7:00 p.m., CBSSN | | at Nevada | | | | | | Lawlor Events Center; Reno, NV |
Mountain West tournament
| March 10-13, 2027; TBA | | vs. TBD | | | | | | Thomas & Mack Center; Paradise, NV |
*Non-conference game. ^{#}Rankings from AP Poll. (#) Tournament seedings in parentheses. All times are in Mountain Time.
