= College Basketball on USA =

- Also known as: College Basketball on NBC Sports (used on air from 2022 to 2025)
- Genre: College basketball telecasts
- Presented by: See the broadcasters section below
- Country of origin: United States
- Original language: English
- No. of seasons: 7 (1982–1988 run); 4 (2022–)

Production
- Executive producer: Vic Piano
- Producer: Brad Fuss
- Camera setup: Multi-camera
- Running time: 120 minutes or until end of game
- Production companies: USA Sports (1982–1988); Mizlou TV Sports (1982–1988); NBC Sports (2022–2025); USA Sports (2025–present)

Original release
- Network: USA Network (1982–88, 2022–present); CNBC (2026–present)
- Release: 1982 – 1988
- Release: 2022 – present

Related
- College Basketball on NBC Sports

College Basketball on USA is the de facto title for the USA Network's coverage of NCAA men's basketball. During the 1980s, USA's telecasts were produced in association with Mizlou TV Sports.

Beginning in 2022, a majority of Atlantic 10 basketball games that previously aired on NBCSN began to be aired on USA Network. These games were produced by NBC Sports. After USA Network was spun off into Versant, the new USA Sports took over production.

== History ==
=== 1980s coverage overview ===
USA aired games from the Big East Conference leading up to their coverage of the 1983 Big East tournament. USA also had rights to games from the Big Ten, ACC, and the old Metro Conference.

Regular season games aired on Thursday nights or Saturdays under the title of College Basketball... followed by the corresponding year during the season such as College Basketball '87. The games were subject to local blackouts. By this time, USA was airing games involving the Southeastern Conference (such as the Mississippi and Mississippi State) and games featuring UTEP and Wyoming.

USA also aired the National Invitation Tournament including the finals from 1985–1988.

Howard David, Bill Raftery, Steve Grad, and Duane Dow were among the commentators used by USA. USA also employed Al Albert, Mal Campbell, Eddie Doucette, Jim Karvellas, Al Trautwig, Pat Scanlon, Bruce Beck, and Pete Maravich. Sometimes, the play-by-play announcers would work with each other and even do color.

On January 24, 1984, Al Albert, working for USA network, called what Syracuse fans call the greatest game in the Carrier Dome ever. Syracuse faced Boston College, and the teams were tied 73–73 after a missed free throw by Boston College's Martin Clark. Sean Kerins passed the rebound to Pearl Washington who took three steps and made a half court shot to win the game. Albert's call lives in infamy as The Greatest Play By Play Call in the Carrier Dome ever: "Washington, two seconds, OHHHH! 'The Pearl' hits it ..at midcourt." Syracuse University basketball fans call that the greatest nine words in Syracuse history.

=== 2020s return and expansion ===
NBC Sports held the rights to 35 men's and women's Atlantic 10 basketball games. Until 2021, these games aired on NBCSN. NBCSN shut down at the end of 2021, after which USA Network assumed its A-10 broadcasts (among other sports properties).

On November 20, 2024, Comcast announced that it would spin off most of its cable networks and select digital properties into a new publicly traded company, Versant, a move that will see USA Network split from NBC Sports. Unlike other NBC Sports college basketball properties, which primarily air on Peacock, the A-10 stayed on USA Network and moved from NBC Sports to USA Sports beginning with the 2025–26 season.

In November 2025, USA Sports announced an agreement with the Pac-12 Conference to broadcast 50 regular season men's basketball games, up to 10 regular season women's basketball games, and all games except the finals of the Pac-12 Conference men's basketball tournament. The agreement will last through the 2030–31 season and begin in the 2026–27 season.

For the 2025–26 season, USA Network will broadcast more than 40 men's and women's college basketball games, including first, second and quarterfinal coverage of the Atlantic 10 men's basketball tournament and the quarterfinals of the Atlantic 10 women's basketball tournament. Due to conflicts with WWE Smackdown, one quarterfinal from both of the men's and the women's tournaments will instead air on CNBC. Steve Burkowski and Tim McCormick, along with Steve Schlanger and John Giannini will serve as the main broadcasting crews for games. Additional play-by-play commentators include Jack Benjamin, Mike Corey, Joe Castellano, and Jason Knapp. Additional color commentators include Zendon Hamilton, Edona Thaqi, and Derek Whittenberg. Lisa Kerney and Dalen Cuff will serve as the primary studio team.

== On-air staff ==
=== Former ===
- Al Albert
- Bruce Beck
- Mal Campbell
- Howard David
- Eddie Doucette
- Duane Dow
- Steve Grad
- Jim Karvellas
- Pete Maravich
- Bill Raftery
- Pat Scanlon
- Al Trautwig

== See also ==
- Men's college basketball on television
