= CW College Basketball =

CW College Basketball is a presentation of NCAA Division I college basketball broadcast by The CW.

== History ==
In 2023, The CW acquired a Raycom Sports-produced package of Atlantic Coast Conference (ACC) athletics that had been previously broadcast by Bally Sports; the package consisted primarily of college football and basketball, including 28 men's basketball games, and 9 women's basketball games per-season. During the initial season, these games were broadcast under the ACC on The CW banner. In the 2024–25 season, The CW added two additional ACC women's basketball games, as well as the HBCU All-Star Game.

In August 2025, CW Sports announced a renewal of its contract with the rebuilt Pac-12 Conference (whose two remaining members as of 2024—Oregon State and Washington State—had been televising their football games on The CW) from 2026–27 through 2030–31, adding rights to 35 men's basketball games and 15 women's basketball games per-season. CW Sports will also televise the semi-finals and championship of the Pac-12 Conference women's basketball tournament. In February 2026, CW Sports announced an agreement with the Mountain West Conference to carry 20 men's basketball games and 15 women's basketball games over the same period. In May 2026, CW Sports renewed its rights to the ACC through 2030–31, carrying 30 men's basketball games and 10 women's basketball games per-season.

For the 2026-27 season, The CW will broadcast 130 men's and women's basketball games from the ACC, Mountain West and Pac 12, along with the inaugural Caesars Lake Tahoe Tipoff Classic. The CW will also broadcast weeknight games for the first time, airing primarily on Wednesday nights and branded as CW Courtside Wednesday. In addition, for the first time, select CW produced games will not air nationally, instead streaming on ESPN Unlimited with some games also receiving limited local simulcasts.
