= 2026–27 Weber State Wildcats men's basketball team =

American college basketball season

2026–27 Weber State Wildcats men's basketball
- Conference: Big Sky Conference
- Record: 1–3 (0–0 Big Sky)
- Head coach: Kaleb Canales (1st season)
- Associate head coach: Patrick Zipfel
- Assistant coaches: Dondrale Campbell; Bobby Jones; Luke Spring
- Home arena: Dee Events Center

2026–27 Big Sky men's basketball standings
| | Conf. | | | | Overall |
| Team | W | | L | PCT | W | | L | PCT |
|---|---|---|---|---|---|---|---|---|
| Southern Utah | 0 | – | 0 | – | 3 | – | 2 | .600 |
| Idaho | 0 | – | 0 | – | 2 | – | 2 | .500 |
| Montana State | 0 | – | 0 | – | 2 | – | 2 | .500 |
| Northern Colorado | 0 | – | 0 | – | 2 | – | 2 | .500 |
| Montana | 0 | – | 0 | – | 2 | – | 3 | .400 |
| Portland State | 0 | – | 0 | – | 2 | – | 3 | .400 |
| Eastern Washington | 0 | – | 0 | – | 1 | – | 3 | .250 |
| Utah Tech | 0 | – | 0 | – | 1 | – | 3 | .250 |
| Weber State | 0 | – | 0 | – | 1 | – | 3 | .250 |
| Idaho State | 0 | – | 0 | – | 0 | – | 4 | .000 |
| Northern Arizona | 0 | – | 0 | – | 0 | – | 4 | .000 |
† 2027 Big Sky tournament winner As of November 17, 2026; Rankings from AP poll

The 2026–27 Weber State Wildcats men's basketball team is representing Weber State University during the 2026–27 NCAA Division I men's basketball season. The Wildcats, are led by first-year head coach Kaleb Canales, as they play their home games at the Dee Events Center in Ogden, Utah as members of the Big Sky Conference.

== Previous season ==
The Wildcats finished the 2025–26 season 16–16, 10–8 in Big Sky play, to finish in sixth place. They lost to Eastern Washington in the quarterfinals of the Big Sky tournament.

== Preseason ==
On October 14, 2026, the Big Sky Conference released their preseason coaches and media poll. Weber State was picked to finish eighth in both the coaches poll and the media poll.

=== Preseason rankings ===
Big Sky Preseason Coaches' Poll
| Place | Team | Votes |
|---|---|---|
| 1 | Montana State | 97 (7) |
| 2 | Northern Colorado | 81 |
| 3 | Eastern Washington | 79 (3) |
| T-4 | Montana | 73 |
| T-4 | Portland State | 73 |
| 6 | Idaho | 56 (1) |
| 7 | Utah Tech | 50 |
| 8 | Weber State | 29 |
| 9 | Idaho State | 26 |
| 10 | Southern Utah | 25 |
| 11 | Northern Arizona | 16 |
(#) first-place votes

Big Sky preseason media poll
| Place | Team | Votes |
|---|---|---|
| 1 | Montana State | 326 (19) |
| 2 | Northern Colorado | 295 (7) |
| 3 | Eastern Washington | 279 (5) |
| 4 | Montana | 254 (1) |
| 5 | Portland State | 236 |
| 6 | Idaho | 183 |
| 7 | Utah Tech | 161 |
| 8 | Weber State | 143 |
| 9 | Idaho State | 93 |
| 10 | Southern Utah | 85 |
| 11 | Northern Arizona | 57 |
(#) first-place votes

=== Preseason All-Big Sky Team ===
No players were named to the All-Big Sky Team.

== Roster ==
2026–27 Weber State Wildcats men's basketball team
Players
Coaches

| Pos. | # | Name | Height | Weight | Year | Previous school | Hometown |
|---|---|---|---|---|---|---|---|
| G | 0 | ArDarius Grayson | 6 ft 1 in (1.85 m) | 185 lb (84 kg) | So | Oakland Technical High School | Oakland, California |
| G | 3 | Alvin Jackson III | 6 ft 5 in (1.96 m) | 205 lb (93 kg) | Jr | Utah | Washington, D.C. |
| F | 4 | Chamberlain Burgess | 6 ft 9 in (2.06 m) | 210 lb (95 kg) | So | Snow College | Cedar Hills, Utah |
| G | 5 | Aaron Powell | 6 ft 2 in (1.88 m) | 185 lb (84 kg) | Jr | Rice | Pasadena, California |
| G | 8 | Mason Abittan | 6 ft 6 in (1.98 m) | 200 lb (91 kg) | So | UNLV | Las Vegas, Nevada |
| G | 10 | Hunter Hansen | 6 ft 5 in (1.96 m) | 180 lb (82 kg) | Fr | Fremont High School | Farr West, Utah |
| G | 11 | Sir Marius Jones | 6 ft 4 in (1.93 m) | 200 lb (91 kg) | So | New Mexico | Oroville, California |
| G | 13 | Gavin Lowe | 5 ft 11 in (1.8 m) | 170 lb (77 kg) | Fr | Olympus High School | Holladay, Utah |
| C | 15 | Declan Cutler | 6 ft 9 in (2.06 m) | 235 lb (107 kg) | Jr | Royal Crown School | Vancouver, British Columbia |
| F | 21 | Dyllan Thompson | 6 ft 7 in (2.01 m) | 215 lb (98 kg) | Jr | Georgia Tech | Houston, Texas |
| F | 23 | Dylan Warlick | 6 ft 5 in (1.96 m) | 210 lb (95 kg) | Jr | Saint Louis | Edmond, Oklahoma |
| G | 32 | Maximillian Russell | 6 ft 1 in (1.85 m) | 170 lb (77 kg) | Fr | Tracy High School | Tracy, California |
| F | 33 | Brock Felder | 6 ft 8 in (2.03 m) | 230 lb (104 kg) | Sr | Seattle | St. George, Utah |
| C | 44 | Augustine Ewke | 6 ft 9 in (2.06 m) | 230 lb (104 kg) | So | New Mexico State | Lagos, Nigeria |

Head coach

- Kaleb Canales (UT Arlington)

Assistant coach(es)

- Patrick Zipfel (Cabrini)
- Dondrale Campbell (Greenville)
- Bobby Jones (Grand Canyon)
- Luke Spring (UMass)

Legend

- (C) Team captain
- (S) Suspended
- (I) Ineligible
- (W) Walk-on
- Injured
- Current redshirt

Roster
Last update: October 19, 2026

== Schedule and results ==
| Date time, TV | Rank^{#} | Opponent^{#} | Result | Record | High points | High rebounds | High assists | Site (attendance) city, state |
Exhibition
| October 17, 2026*; 7:00 pm | | Colorado Christian | W 90-76 | – | 20 – Powell | 8 – Burgess | 6 – Warlick | Dee Events Center (10); Ogden, UT |
| October 24, 2026*; 4:00 pm | | Westminster | W 96-74 | – | 18 – Thompson | 9 – Ewke | 7 – Lowe | Dee Events Center (150); Ogden, UT |
| October 28, 2026*; 6:00 pm | | Colorado Mesa | W 85-60 | – | 18 – Warlick | 8 – Warlick | 4 – Warlick | Dee Events Center; Ogden, UT |
Regular season
| November 2, 2026*; 7:30 pm, Pac-12 YouTube | | at Oregon State | L 61-102 | 0-1 | 15 – Lowe | 7 – Grayson | 3 – Grayson | Gill Coliseum (3,546); Corvallis, OR |
| November 7, 2026*; 7:00 pm, ESPN+ | | Utah Valley | W 101-93 | 0-2 | 22 – Abittan | 7 – Lowe | 7 – Lowe | Dee Events Center (3,375); Ogden, UT |
| November 10, 2026*; 7:00 pm, ESPN+ | | at Utah | W 85-64 | 0-3 | 22 – Warlick | 7 – Ekwe | 8 – Lowe | Jon M. Huntsman Center (5,742); Salt Lake, UT |
| November 14, 2026*; 4:00 pm, ESPN+ | | Lincoln (CA) | W 80-57 | 1-3 | 13 – Warlick | 10 – Burgess | 4 – Abittan | Dee Events Center (2,115); Ogden, UT |
| November 18, 2026*; 7:00 pm, Pac-12 YouTube | | at Utah State | | | | | | Dee Glen Smith Spectrum; Logan, UT |
| November 24, 2026*; 5:00 pm, ESPN+ | | Tarleton State; Junction City Jam | | | | | | Dee Events Center; Ogden, UT |
| November 25, 2026*; 4:00 pm, ESPN+ | | CSUN; Junction City Jam | | | | | | Dee Events Center; Ogden, UT |
| November 28, 2026*; 3:00 pm, ESPN+ | | at Cal State Fullerton | | | | | | Titan Gym; Fullerton, CA |
| December 3, 2026; 7:00 pm, ESPN+ | | at Utah Tech | | | | | | Burns Arena; St. George, UT |
| December 5, 2026; 6:30 pm, ESPN+ | | at Southern Utah | | | | | | America First Event Center; Cedar City, UT |
| December 9, 2026*; 12:00 pm, ESPN+ | | Washington State | | | | | | Dee Event Center; Ogden, UT |
| December 15, 2026*; 7:00 pm, ESPN+ | | at BYU | | | | | | Marriott Center; Provo, UT |
| December 18, 2026*; 7:00 pm, ESPN+ | | at UC Santa Barbara | | | | | | UC Santa Barbara Events Center; Santa Barbara, CA |
| December 31, 2026; 2:00 pm, ESPN+ | | Northern Arizona | | | | | | Dee Events Center; Ogden, UT |
| January 7, 2027; 6:00 pm, ESPN+ | | Montana | | | | | | Dee Events Center; Ogden, UT |
| January 9, 2027; 4:00 pm, ESPN+ | | Montana State | | | | | | Dee Events Center; Ogden, UT |
| January 14, 2027; 8:00 pm, ESPN+ | | at Portland State | | | | | | Viking Pavilion; Portland, OR |
| January 16, 2027; 6:00 pm, ESPN+ | | at Northern Colorado | | | | | | Bank of Colorado Arena; Greeley, CO |
| January 18, 2027; 6:00 pm, ESPN+ | | Idaho | | | | | | Dee Events Center; Ogden, UT |
| January 23, 2027; 7:00 pm, ESPN+ | | at Idaho State | | | | | | Reed Gym; Pocatello, ID |
| January 25, 2027; 7:00 pm, ESPN+ | | at Eastern Washington | | | | | | Reese Court; Cheney, WA |
| January 28, 2027; 6:00 pm, ESPN+ | | Southern Utah | | | | | | Dee Events Center; Ogden, UT |
| January 30, 2027; 1:00 pm, ESPN+ | | Utah Tech | | | | | | Dee Events Center; Ogden, UT |
| February 6, 2027; 6:00 pm, ESPN+ | | at Northern Arizona | | | | | | Findlay Toyota Court; Flagstaff, AZ |
| February 11, 2027; 6:00 pm, ESPN+ | | Northern Colorado | | | | | | Dee Events Center; Ogden, UT |
| February 13, 2027; 4:00 pm, ESPN+ | | Portland State | | | | | | Dee Events Center; Ogden, UT |
| February 18, 2027; 7:00 pm, ESPN+ | | at Montana State | | | | | | Brick Breeden Fieldhouse; Bozeman, MT |
| February 20, 2027; 4:00 pm, ESPN+ | | at Montana | | | | | | Dahlberg Arena; Missoula, MT |
| February 22, 2027; 7:00 pm, ESPN+ | | at Idaho | | | | | | ICCU Arena; Moscow, ID |
| February 27, 2027; 5:00 pm, ESPN+ | | Idaho State | | | | | | Dee Events Center; Ogden, UT |
| March 1, 2027; 6:00 pm, ESPN+ | | Eastern Washington | | | | | | Dee Events Center; Ogden, UT |
Big Sky tournament
| March 5-10, 2027; TBA, ESPN+ | | vs. | | | | | | Idaho Central Arena; Boise, ID |
*Non-conference game. ^{#}Rankings from AP Poll. (#) Tournament seedings in parentheses. All times are in Mountain.
