= Zipfel =

Zipfel is a surname. Notable people with the surname include:

- Bud Zipfel (born 1938), American baseball player
- Patrick Zipfel (born 1967), American basketball coach and college athletics director
- Paul Albert Zipfel (1935–2019), American Roman Catholic bishop
- Peter Zipfel (born 1956), German skier

== See also ==
- 7565 Zipfel, astral object
