= 2026–27 Idaho State Bengals men's basketball team =

American college basketball season

2026–27 Idaho State Bengals men's basketball
- Conference: Big Sky Conference
- Record: 1–4 (0–0 Big Sky)
- Head coach: Ryan Looney (8th season)
- Assistant coaches: CJ Edwards (2nd season); Cam Flabel (1st season); Tim Nolan (1st season); Rob Rodriguez (1st season)
- Home arena: Reed Gym (Capacity: 3,214)

2026–27 Big Sky men's basketball standings
| | Conf. | | | | Overall |
| Team | W | | L | PCT | W | | L | PCT |
|---|---|---|---|---|---|---|---|---|
| Portland State | 0 | – | 0 | – | 3 | – | 3 | .500 |
| Southern Utah | 0 | – | 0 | – | 3 | – | 3 | .500 |
| Eastern Washington | 0 | – | 0 | – | 2 | – | 3 | .400 |
| Idaho | 0 | – | 0 | – | 2 | – | 3 | .400 |
| Montana | 0 | – | 0 | – | 2 | – | 3 | .400 |
| Northern Colorado | 0 | – | 0 | – | 2 | – | 3 | .400 |
| Montana State | 0 | – | 0 | – | 2 | – | 4 | .333 |
| Idaho State | 0 | – | 0 | – | 1 | – | 4 | .200 |
| Northern Arizona | 0 | – | 0 | – | 1 | – | 4 | .200 |
| Utah Tech | 0 | – | 0 | – | 1 | – | 4 | .200 |
| Weber State | 0 | – | 0 | – | 1 | – | 4 | .200 |
† 2027 Big Sky tournament winner As of November 21, 2026; Rankings from AP poll

The 2026–27 Idaho State Bengals men's basketball team will represent the Idaho State University during the 2026–27 NCAA Division I men's basketball season. The Bengals will be led by eighth-year head coach Ryan Looney and will play their home games at Reed Gym in Pocatello, Idaho as a member of the Big Sky Conference.

== Previous season ==
Idaho State finished the 2025–26 season 13–20, 5–13 in the Big Sky Conference to finish ninth in the conference. As the 9-seed in the Big Sky Tournament the Bengals defeated 10-seed Northern Arizona in the First round before falling to top-seed Portland State in the Quarterfinals 78-85 to end their season.

== Offseason ==
=== Departures ===
Idaho State Bengals departures
| Name | Number | Pos. | Height | Weight | Year | Hometown | Reason for departure |
|---|---|---|---|---|---|---|---|
| Gus Etchison | 0 | G | 5'11" | 150 | (redshirt) Senior | Arcadia, IN | Transferred to IU Indy |
| Jamison Guerra | 2 | G | 6'0" | 200 | Graduate | Sherwood, OR | Out of eligibility |
| Jaedyn Brown | 4 | G | 6'4" | 185 | (redshirt) Sophomore | Pullman, WA | Transferred to Saint Martin's |
| Cheikh Sow | 5 | G | 6'7" | 195 | (redshirt) Junior | Thiès, Senegal | Transferred to Cal State Monterey Bay |
| Trey Arland | 8 | G/F | 6'7" | 190 | Junior | Kennewick, WA | Departed program |
| Connor Hollenbeck | 10 | F | 6'7" | 225 | Graduate | Rapid City, SD | Out of eligibility |
| Martin Kheil | 11 | G | 6'5" | 205 | Sophomore | Jindřichův Hradec, Czech Republic | Transferred to Iona |
| Lachlan Brewer | 12 | G/F | 6'6" | 210 | Sophomore | Launceston, Australia | Signed with North Melbourne Roos of the AFL |
| Louis Bond | 13 | G | 6'5" | 185 | Freshman | Los Angeles, CA | Transferred to Northeastern |
| Kasen Carpenter | 14 | G | 6'5" | 190 | Senior | Rupert, ID | Out of eligibility |
| Caleb Van De Griend | 24 | F | 6'8" | 255 | Senior | Bridgetown, Australia | Out of eligibility |
| Evan Otten | 30 | F | 6'11" | 240 | (redshirt) Sophomore | Redmond, OR | Transferred to Arizona |
| Blake Daberkow | 32 | F | 6'10" | 235 | Senior | Lincoln, NE | Out of eligibility |

=== Incoming transfers ===
Idaho State Bengals incoming transfers
| Name | Number | Pos. | Height | Weight | Year | Hometown | Previous School |
|---|---|---|---|---|---|---|---|
| Jeremiah Dorsey | 1 | G | 5'11" | 170 | Senior | Queens, NY | Jefferson |
| MaCarhy Morris | 2 | G | 6'0" | 190 | Senior | Long Beach, CA | Concordia-Irvine |
| Ty Virgil | 3 | G | 6'5" | 190 | (redshirt) Freshman | Sacramento, CA | Pepperdine |
| Kenyon DeMuynck | 4 | F | 6'9" | 210 | Sophomore | Oakland, CA | CCSF |
| Eyal Harel | 13 | G | 6'7" | 205 | Sophomore | Hod HaSharon, Israel | Pacific |
| Malachi Johnson | 14 | F | 6'10" | 205 | Sophomore | Sacramento, CA | Stanislaus State |
| Ike Palmer | 23 | F | 6'9" | 215 | Junior | South Jordan, UT | Utah State Eastern |
| Malik Johnson | 34 | F | 6'11" | 210 | Junior | Sacramento, CA | Stanislaus State |
| Aden Goffe | 55 | G | 6'0" | 180 | Senior | New Haven, CT | Elms College |

=== 2026 recruiting class ===
College recruiting
| Name | Hometown | School | Height | Weight | Commit date |
|---|---|---|---|---|---|
| Nathan Amoran; SG | Östersund, Sweden | Södertälje BBK | 6 ft 3 in (1.91 m) | 210 lb (95 kg) | Apr 17, 2026 |
| Nathan Amoran; SG | Recruit ratings: (NR) | | | | |
| McKae Amundsen; CG | Fresno, CA | Clovis North HS | 5 ft 10 in (1.78 m) | 155 lb (70 kg) | Aug 8, 2025 |
| McKae Amundsen; CG | Recruit ratings: (NR) | | | | |
| Joven Dulay; SG | Folsom, CA | Folsom HS | 6 ft 6 in (1.98 m) | 185 lb (84 kg) | Sep 16, 2025 |
| Joven Dulay; SG | Recruit ratings: (NR) | | | | |
| Eli Garner; SG/SF | La Verne, CA | Damien HS | 6 ft 6 in (1.98 m) | N/A | Mar 27, 2026 |
| Eli Garner; SG/SF | Recruit ratings: (NR) | | | | |
| Bryce Lowenbach; PF/C | Prineville, OR | Crook County HS | 6 ft 9 in (2.06 m) | 205 lb (93 kg) | Mar 29, 2026 |
| Bryce Lowenbach; PF/C | Recruit ratings: (NR) | | | | |
Overall recruit ranking: Scout: – Rivals: –
Note: In many cases, Scout, Rivals, 247Sports, On3, and ESPN may conflict in their listings of height and weight.; In these cases, the average was taken. ESPN grades are on a 100-point scale.; Sources: "2026 Idaho State Basketball Recruiting Commits". Scout.; "Scout.com Team Recruiting Rankings". Scout.; "2026 Team Ranking". Rivals.

== Roster ==
2026–27 Idaho State Bengals men's basketball team
Players
Coaches

| Pos. | # | Name | Height | Weight | Year | Previous school | Hometown |
|---|---|---|---|---|---|---|---|
| G | 1 | Jeremiah Dorsey | 5 ft 11 in (1.8 m) | 170 lb (77 kg) | Sr | Jefferson | Queens, New York |
| G | 2 | MaCarhy Morris | 6 ft 0 in (1.83 m) | 190 lb (86 kg) | Sr | Concordia-Irvine | Long Beach, California |
| G | 3 | Ty Virgil | 6 ft 5 in (1.96 m) | 190 lb (86 kg) | RS Fr | Pepperdine | Sacramento, California |
| F | 4 | Kenyon DeMuynck | 6 ft 9 in (2.06 m) | 210 lb (95 kg) | So | CCSF | Oakland, California |
| G | 5 | Joven Dulay | 6 ft 6 in (1.98 m) | 200 lb (91 kg) | Fr | Folsom HS | Folsom, California |
| G | 10 | Nathan Amoran | 6 ft 3 in (1.91 m) | 210 lb (95 kg) | Fr | Södertälje BBK | Östersund, Sweden |
| G | 11 | Landen Birley | 6 ft 4 in (1.93 m) | 180 lb (82 kg) | So | West Valley HS | Yakima, Washington |
| G | 13 | Eyal Harel | 6 ft 7 in (2.01 m) | 205 lb (93 kg) | So | Pacific | Hod HaSharon, Israel |
| F | 14 | Malachi Johnson | 6 ft 10 in (2.08 m) | 205 lb (93 kg) | So | Stanislaus State | Sacramento, California |
| F | 15 | Bryce Lowenbach | 6 ft 10 in (2.08 m) | 215 lb (98 kg) | Fr | Crook County HS | Prineville, Oregon |
| F | 21 | Quin Patterson | 6 ft 7 in (2.01 m) | 205 lb (93 kg) | GS | UC San Diego | Snoqualmie, Washington |
| F | 23 | Ike Palmer | 6 ft 9 in (2.06 m) | 215 lb (98 kg) | Jr | Utah State Eastern | South Jordan, Utah |
| G | 25 | Eli Garner | 6 ft 6 in (1.98 m) | 200 lb (91 kg) | Fr | Damien HS | Los Angeles, California |
| G | 30 | McKae Amundsen | 5 ft 10 in (1.78 m) | 160 lb (73 kg) | Fr | Clovis North HS | Fresno, California |
| F | 34 | Malik Johnson | 6 ft 11 in (2.11 m) | 210 lb (95 kg) | Jr | Stanislaus State | Sacramento, California |
| G | 55 | Aden Goffe | 6 ft 0 in (1.83 m) | 180 lb (82 kg) | Sr | Elms College | New Haven, Connecticut |

Head coach

- Ryan Looney (Eastern Oregon)

Assistant coach(es)

- CJ Edwards (LeTourneau)
- Cam Flabel (Idaho State)
- Tim Nolan (Wyoming)
- Rob Rodriguez (Trinity Western)

Legend

- (C) Team captain
- (S) Suspended
- (I) Ineligible
- (W) Walk-on
- Injured
- Current redshirt

Roster

== Schedule and results ==
| Date time, TV | Rank^{#} | Opponent^{#} | Result | Record | High points | High rebounds | High assists | Site (attendance) city, state |
Exhibition
| October 23, 2026*; 8:00 p.m., ESPN+ | | Montana Western | W 101–51 | – | – | – | – | Reed Gym; Pocatello, ID |
Non-conference regular season
| November 2, 2026*; 7:30 p.m., YouTube | | at Utah State | L 58–94 | 0–1 | 15 – Morris | 5 – Mala. Johnson | 5 – Morris | Smith Spectrum (9,715); Logan, UT |
| November 6, 2026*; 6:30 p.m., MW+ | | at Wyoming | L 62–93 | 0–2 | 17 – Morris | 4 – Mali. Johnson | 3 – Palmer | Arena-Auditorium (3,393); Laramie, WY |
| November 8, 2026*; 1:00 p.m., MW+ | | at Air Force | L 82–89 | 0–3 | 22 – Morris | 12 – Mala. Johnson | 4 – Harel | Clune Arena (1,125); Air Force Academy, CO |
| November 14, 2026*; 8:00 p.m., ESPN+ | | at Seattle U | | | | | | Redhawk Center; Seattle, WA |
| November 20, 2026*; 2:00 p.m., ESPN+ | | South Dakota State | | | | | | Reed Gym; Pocatello, ID |
| November 24, 2026*; 7:00 p.m., YouTube | | at Boise State | | | | | | ExtraMile Arena; Boise, ID |
| November 28, 2026*; 2:00 p.m., ESPN+ | | Azusa Pacific | | | | | | Reed Gym; Pocatello, ID |
| December 3, 2026; 6:30 p.m., ESPN+ | | at Southern Utah | | | | | | America First Event Center; Cedar City, UT |
| December 5, 2026; 7:00 p.m., ESPN+ | | at Utah Tech | | | | | | Burns Arena; St. George, UT |
| December 10, 2026*; 7:00 p.m., ESPN+ | | Cal State Fullerton | | | | | | Reed Gym; Pocatello, ID |
| December 12, 2026*; 4:00 p.m., ESPN+ | | Justice | | | | | | Reed Gym; Pocatello, ID |
| December 17, 2026*; 6:00 p.m., MW+ | | at UC Davis | | | | | | University Credit Union Center; Davis, CA |
| December 20, 2026*; 1:00 p.m., SLN | | at North Dakota State | | | | | | Scheels Center; Fargo, ND |
| December 28, 2026*; 7:00 p.m., ESPN+ | | Northwest Indian College | | | | | | Reed Gym; Pocatello, ID |
| January 2, 2027; 4:00 p.m., ESPN+ | | Northern Arizona | | | | | | Reed Gym; Pocatello, ID |
| January 7, 2027; 7:00 p.m., ESPN+ | | Montana State | | | | | | Reed Gym; Pocatello, ID |
| January 9, 2027; 4:00 p.m., ESPN+ | | Montana | | | | | | Reed Gym; Pocatello, ID |
| January 14, 2027; 6:00 p.m., ESPN+ | | at Northern Colorado | | | | | | Bank of Colorado Arena; Greeley, CO |
| January 16, 2027; 3:00 p.m., ESPN+ | | at Portland State | | | | | | Viking Pavilion; Portland, OR |
| January 18, 2027; 7:00 p.m., ESPN+ | | at Eastern Washington | | | | | | Reese Court; Cheney, WA |
| January 23, 2027; 7:00 p.m., ESPN+ | | Weber State | | | | | | Reed Gym; Pocatello, ID |
| January 25, 2027; 7:00 p.m., ESPN+ | | at Idaho; Battle of the Domes | | | | | | ICCU Arena; Moscow, ID |
| January 28, 2027; 7:00 p.m., ESPN+ | | Utah Tech | | | | | | Reed Gym; Pocatello, ID |
| January 30, 2027; 4:00 p.m., ESPN+ | | Southern Utah | | | | | | Reed Gym; Pocatello, ID |
| February 4, 2027; 6:00 p.m., ESPN+ | | at Northern Arizona | | | | | | Rolle Activity Center; Flagstaff, AZ |
| February 11, 2027; 7:00 p.m., ESPN+ | | Portland State | | | | | | Reed Gym; Pocatello, ID |
| February 13, 2027; 4:00 p.m., ESPN+ | | Northern Colorado | | | | | | Reed Gym; Pocatello, ID |
| February 18, 2027; 7:00 p.m., ESPN+ | | at Montana | | | | | | Dahlberg Arena; Missoula, MT |
| February 20, 2027; 6:00 p.m., ESPN+ | | at Montana State | | | | | | Worthington Arena; Bozeman, MT |
| February 22, 2027; 7:00 p.m., ESPN+ | | Eastern Washington | | | | | | Reed Gym; Pocatello, ID |
| February 27, 2027; 5:00 p.m., ESPN+ | | at Weber State | | | | | | Dee Events Center; Ogden, UT |
| March 1, 2027; 7:00 p.m., ESPN+ | | Idaho; Battle of the Domes | | | | | | Reed Gym; Pocatello, ID |
Big Sky tournament
| March 5, 2027; TBD, TBD | | vs. TBD | | | | | | Idaho Central Arena; Boise, ID |
*Non-conference game. ^{#}Rankings from AP Poll. (#) Tournament seedings in parentheses. All times are in Mountain Time.
