= 2026–27 Eastern Washington Eagles men's basketball team =

American college basketball season

2026–27 Eastern Washington Eagles men's basketball
- Conference: Big Sky Conference
- Record: 2–3 (0–0 Big Sky)
- Head coach: Dan Monson (3rd season)
- Associate head coach: Ryan Lundgren
- Assistant coaches: Larry Anderson; MicGuire Monson; Alex Hobbs; Matt Mayberg
- Home arena: Reese Court

2026–27 Big Sky men's basketball standings
	Conf.				Overall
Team	W		L	PCT	W		L	PCT
Southern Utah	0	–	0	–	3	–	2	.600
Eastern Washington	0	–	0	–	2	–	3	.400
Idaho	0	–	0	–	2	–	3	.400
Montana	0	–	0	–	2	–	3	.400
Montana State	0	–	0	–	2	–	3	.400
Northern Colorado	0	–	0	–	2	–	3	.400
Portland State	0	–	0	–	2	–	3	.400
Utah Tech	0	–	0	–	1	–	3	.250
Northern Arizona	0	–	0	–	1	–	4	.200
Weber State	0	–	0	–	1	–	4	.200
Idaho State	0	–	0	–	0	–	4	.000
† 2027 Big Sky tournament winner As of November 19, 2026; Rankings from AP poll

The 2026–27 Eastern Washington Eagles men's basketball team will represent Eastern Washington University during the 2026–27 NCAA Division I men's basketball season. The Eagles, led by second-year head coach Dan Monson, played their home games at Reese Court in Cheney, Washington as members of the Big Sky Conference.

== Previous season ==
The Eagles finished the 2025–26 season 14–19, 11–7 in Big Sky play, to finish in third place. They defeated Weber State in the first round of the Big Sky tournament, before falling to Idaho in the second round.

== Preseason ==
On October 14, 2026, the Big Sky Conference released their preseason coaches and media poll. Eastern Washington was picked to finish third in both the coaches' poll and media poll.

=== Preseason rankings ===
Big Sky Preseason Coaches' Poll
Place	Team	Votes
1	Montana State	97 (7)
2	Northern Colorado	81
3	Eastern Washington	79 (3)
T-4	Montana	73
T-4	Portland State	73
6	Idaho	56 (1)
7	Utah Tech	50
8	Weber State	29
9	Idaho State	26
10	Southern Utah	25
11	Northern Arizona	16
(#) first-place votes

Big Sky preseason media poll
Place	Team	Votes
1	Montana State	326 (19)
2	Northern Colorado	295 (7)
3	Eastern Washington	279 (5)
4	Montana	254 (1)
5	Portland State	236
6	Idaho	183
7	Utah Tech	161
8	Weber State	143
9	Idaho State	93
10	Southern Utah	85
11	Northern Arizona	57
(#) first-place votes

=== Preseason All-Big Sky Team ===
Preseason All-Big Sky Team
Player	Year	Position
Andrew Cook	Graduate student	Guard
Alton Hamilton IV	Senior	Forward

== Roster ==
2026–27 Eastern Washington Eagles men's basketball team
Players
Coaches

Pos.	#	Name	Height	Weight	Year	Previous school	Hometown
F	0	Lance Horntvedt Jr.	6 ft 8 in (2.03 m)	210 lb (95 kg)	Fr	Richland HS	Richland, WA
G	1	Malachi Richmond	6 ft 2 in (1.88 m)	190 lb (86 kg)	Fr	Edge Prep	Sacramento, CA
G	2	Tavi Jackson	6 ft 3 in (1.91 m)	180 lb (82 kg)	Sr	Southern Utah	Las Vegas, NV
F	4	Alton Hamilton IV	6 ft 9 in (2.06 m)	250 lb (113 kg)	Sr	Lewis-Clark State College	Fontana, CA
F	5	Alan Gballou	6 ft 7 in (2.01 m)	270 lb (122 kg)	RS Fr	Layton Christian Academy	Paris, France
F	6	Jamal Miller	6 ft 6 in (1.98 m)	220 lb (100 kg)	RS So	Kennesaw State	Spokane, WA
G	7	Jalen Griffith	5 ft 9 in (1.75 m)	140 lb (64 kg)	Sr	Western Michigan	Chicago, IL
G	9	Andrew Cook	6 ft 5 in (1.96 m)	220 lb (100 kg)	GS	Carroll College	Huntington Beach, CA
G	10	Maddox Monson	6 ft 2 in (1.88 m)	180 lb (82 kg)	RS Sr	Long Beach State	Los Alamitos, CA
G	11	Cole Scherer	6 ft 1 in (1.85 m)	190 lb (86 kg)	So	Valor Christian High School	Littleton, CO
G	12	Isak Homelius	6 ft 5 in (1.96 m)	215 lb (98 kg)	So	Western Texas College	Huskvarna, Sweden
C	22	Zach Trezvant	7 ft 2 in (2.18 m)	225 lb (102 kg)	Fr	Myerscough College	Manchester, England
F	33	Emmett Marquardt	6 ft 10 in (2.08 m)	245 lb (111 kg)	RS Jr	Garfield High School	Seattle, WA
F	35	Shaumba Ngoyi	6 ft 8 in (2.03 m)	215 lb (98 kg)	RS Jr	Long Beach State	Kinshasa, DR Congo
F	44	Ayden Hamilton	6 ft 5 in (1.96 m)	225 lb (102 kg)	RS So	Life Pacific University	Fontana, CA

Head coach

- Dan Monson (Idaho)

Assistant coach(es)

- Ryan Lundgren (Boise State)
- Larry Anderson (Long Beach State)
- MicGuire Monson (Boise State)
- Alex Hobbs (Boise State)
- Matt Mayberg (Gonzaga)

Legend

- (C) Team captain
- (S) Suspended
- (I) Ineligible
- (W) Walk-on
- Injured
- Current redshirt

Roster
Last update: October 20, 2026

== Schedule and results ==
Date time, TV	Rank^{#}	Opponent^{#}	Result	Record	High points	High rebounds	High assists	Site (attendance) city, state
Exhibition
October 18, 2026*; 12:00 p.m.		Cal State Bakersfield	W 71–65	–	24 – Cook	9 – Marquardt	4 – Scherer	Reese Court (243); Cheney, WA
October 23, 2026*; 7:00 p.m., ESPN+		at No. 5 Arizona	L 54–85	–	10 – Miller	4 – Tied	3 – Griffith	McKale Center (12,897); Tucson, AZ
October 27, 2026*; 6:00 p.m.		Western Washington	W 81–65	–	26 – Hamilton IV	9 – Hamilton IV	3 – Griffith	Reese Court (304); Cheney, WA
Regular season
November 2, 2026*; 7:00 p.m., ACCNX		at Stanford	L 65–74	0–1	20 – Hamilton IV	9 – Hamilton IV	3 – Griffith	Maples Pavilion (2,103); Stanford, CA
November 6, 2026*; 3:00 p.m., B1G+		at Oregon	L 71–98	0–2	14 – Richmond	4 – Hamilton IV	3 – Tied	Matthew Knight Arena (4,047); Eugene, OR
November 9, 2026*; 6:30 p.m., YouTube		at Oregon State	L 84–94	0–3	18 – Marquardt	8 – Hamilton IV	4 – Richmond	Gill Coliseum (2,636); Corvallis, OR
November 13, 2026*; 6:00 p.m.		Corban	W 102–68	1–3	20 – Homelius	8 – Trezvant	5 – Scherer	Reese Court (998); Cheney, WA
November 17, 2026*; 5:30 p.m.		at Utah	W 71–67	2–3	24 – Hamilton IV	10 – Miller	2 – Tied	Jon M. Huntsman Center (5,273); Salt Lake City, UT
November 23, 2026*; 7:00 p.m.		at UNLV						Thomas & Mack Center; Las Vegas, NV
November 25, 2026*; 6:00 p.m.		at LMU						Gersten Pavilion; Los Angeles, CA
November 29, 2026*; 12:00 p.m.		at Wyoming						Arena-Auditorium; Laramie, WY
December 3, 2026; 7:00 p.m.		at Portland State						Viking Pavilion; Portland, OR
December 5, 2026; 1:00 p.m., ESPN+		at Northern Colorado						Bank of Colorado Arena; Greeley, CO
December 8, 2026*; 6:00 p.m.		Northwest						Reese Court; Cheney, WA
December 13, 2026*; 2:00 p.m.		at Portland						Chiles Center; Portland, OR
December 17, 2026*; 6:00 p.m.		Seattle Pacific						Reese Court; Cheney, WA
December 22, 2026*; TBA		vs. Washington State; 509 Classic						Numerica Veterans Arena; Spokane, WA
December 31, 2026; 6:00 p.m.		Southern Utah						Reese Court; Cheney, WA
January 2, 2027; 2:00 p.m.		Utah Tech						Reese Court; Cheney, WA
January 7, 2027; 6:00 p.m.		Northern Arizona						Reese Court; Cheney, WA
January 14, 2027; 6:00 p.m.		at Montana State						Worthington Arena; Bozeman, MT
January 16, 2027; 3:00 p.m.		at Montana						Dahlberg Arena; Missoula, MT
January 18, 2027; 6:00 p.m.		Idaho State						Reese Court; Cheney, WA
January 23, 2027; 2:00 p.m.		at Idaho						ICCU Arena; Moscow, ID
January 25, 2027; 6:00 p.m.		Weber State						Reese Court; Cheney, WA
January 28, 2027; 6:00 p.m., ESPN+		Northern Colorado						Reese Court; Cheney, WA
January 30, 2027; 2:00 p.m., ESPN+		Portland State						Reese Court; Cheney, WA
February 4, 2027; 6:00 p.m.		at Utah Tech						Burns Arena; St. George, UT
February 6, 2027; 5:30 p.m.		at Southern Utah						America First Event Center; Cedar City, UT
February 11, 2027; 6:00 p.m.		Montana						Reese Court; Cheney, WA
February 13, 2027; 2:00 p.m.		Montana State						Reese Court; Cheney, WA
February 20, 2027; 5:00 p.m.		at Northern Arizona						Findlay Toyota Court; Flagstaff, AZ
February 22, 2027; 6:00 p.m.		at Idaho State						Reed Gym; Pocatello, ID
February 27, 2027; 2:00 p.m.		Idaho						Reese Court; Cheney, WA
March 1, 2027; 5:00 p.m.		at Weber State						Dee Events Center; Ogden, UT
Big Sky tournament
March 5-10, 2027; TBA		vs. TBA						Idaho Central Arena; Boise, ID
*Non-conference game. ^{#}Rankings from AP poll. (#) Tournament seedings in parentheses. All times are in Pacific.
