= 2026–27 Portland State Vikings men's basketball team =

American college basketball season

2026–27 Portland State Vikings men's basketball
- Conference: Big Sky Conference
- Record: 3–3 (0–0 Big Sky)
- Head coach: Jase Coburn (6th season)
- Associate head coach: Matt Dunn (4th, 6th overall season)
- Assistant coaches: Jamaal Williams (3rd, 2nd consecutive season); Mike Harmon (3rd season); Gabe Palmquist-Clark (2nd season); Will Graves (1st season)
- Home arena: Viking Pavilion (Capacity: 3,094)

2026–27 Big Sky men's basketball standings
	Conf.				Overall
Team	W		L	PCT	W		L	PCT
Portland State	0	–	0	–	3	–	3	.500
Southern Utah	0	–	0	–	3	–	3	.500
Eastern Washington	0	–	0	–	2	–	3	.400
Idaho	0	–	0	–	2	–	3	.400
Montana	0	–	0	–	2	–	3	.400
Northern Colorado	0	–	0	–	2	–	3	.400
Montana State	0	–	0	–	2	–	4	.333
Northern Arizona	0	–	0	–	1	–	4	.200
Utah Tech	0	–	0	–	1	–	4	.200
Weber State	0	–	0	–	1	–	4	.200
Idaho State	0	–	0	–	0	–	4	.000
† 2027 Big Sky tournament winner As of November 20, 2026; Rankings from AP poll

The 2026–27 Portland State Vikings men's basketball team will represent Portland State University during the 2026–27 NCAA Division I men's basketball season. The Vikings will be led by sixth-year head coach Jase Coburn and will play their home games at Viking Pavilion in Portland, Oregon as a member of the Big Sky Conference.

== Previous season ==
Portland State finished the 2025-26 season 20–11, 13–5 in the Big Sky Conference to finish first in the conference. Their top scorer, Haven Chao decided to lead the conference himself. Along with aric metnak etc. As the top seed in the Big Sky Tournament the Vikings defeated 9-seed Idaho State in the First round before falling to 4-seed Montana in the Semifinals 72–75 to end their season.

=== Departures ===
Portland State Vikings departures
Name	Number	Pos.	Height	Weight	Year	Hometown	Reason for departure
Keyon Kensie Jr.	0	G	6'8"	200	Junior	Los Angeles, CA	Transferred to Nevada
Kelcy Phipps	1	G	6'2"	190	(redshirt) Sophomore	Carson, CA	Transferred to UNC Asheville
Mozae Downing-Rivers	2	G	6'6"	215	Senior	Lawrence, KS	Out of eligibility
Brycen Long	3	G	6'2"	190	(redshirt) Senior	Gilbert, AZ	Out of eligibility
Tre-Vaughn Minott	4	C	6'10"	245	Senior	Montreal, QC, Canada	Out of eligibility
Jaylin Henderson	5	G	6'3"	175	Senior	Wichita, KS	Out of eligibility
Sebastian Tidor	6	G	6'5"	195	Junior	Dallas, GA	Transferred to Prairie View A&M
Isaac Brice	9	F	6'7"	210	Senior	Picayune, MS	Retired from basketball
Samuel Stewart IV	12	G	6'4"	180	Senior	San Diego, CA	Out of eligibility
Kean Webb	13	F	6'11"	235	Sophomore	St. George, UT	Transferred to Albany
Alex Dupre	15	G	6'5"	190	(redshirt) Freshman	Los Angeles, CA	Transferred to Utah Tech
Isaiah Williams	21	G	6'7"	190	Senior	Oklahoma City, OK	Out of eligibility
Terri Miller Jr.	23	F	6'8"	250	Senior	Fresno, CA	Out of eligibility
Matt Beatty	35	C	6'10"	215	Freshman	Portland, OR	Transferred to Lower Columbia College

=== Incoming transfers ===
Portland State Vikings incoming transfers
Name	Number	Pos.	Height	Weight	Year	Hometown	Previous School
Yaroslav Nikonov	0	G	6'5"	210	Sophomore	Gelendzhik, Russia	CSKA-2
Dennis Johnson III	1	G	6'3"	190	Sophomore	Seattle, WA	Western Washington
Luke Kearney	2	F	6'7"	215	Senior	Phoenix, AZ	Utah State
Koren Johnson	3	G	6'1"	180	(redshirt) Senior	Seattle, WA	Ole Miss
Nehemiah Pollard	4	G	6'4"	210	Senior	Tacoma, WA	Western Washington
Trevor Frank	5	G	6'1"	185	(redshirt) Senior	Katy, TX	Dallas Baptist
Francesco Corato	6	F	6'9"	225	Freshman	Venice, Italy	Reyer Venezia
Emil Skyttä	8	G	6'5"	205	(redshirt) Senior	Helsinki, Finland	North Dakota State
Alexandros Skliros	12	F	6'9"	240	Freshman	Patras, Greece	Promitheas Patras B.C.
KC Ibekwe	17	C	6'11"	285	Graduate	Coquitlam, BC, Canada	Pacific
Gantas Križanauskas	22	G	6'4"	205	Freshman	Vilnius, Lithuania	Rytas Vilnius
Jaquay Randolph	23	F	6'10"	230	Senior	Tallahassee, FL	Southern Wesleyan
Antonio Pusateri	24	F	6'7"	205	Senior	San Francisco, CA	Lubbock Christian

=== 2026 recruiting class ===
College recruiting
Name	Hometown	School	Height	Weight	Commit date
None -	-	-	N/A	N/A	-
None -	Recruit ratings: No ratings found				
Overall recruit ranking: Scout: – Rivals: –
Note: In many cases, Scout, Rivals, 247Sports, On3, and ESPN may conflict in their listings of height and weight.; In these cases, the average was taken. ESPN grades are on a 100-point scale.; Sources: "2026 Portland State Basketball Recruiting Commits". Scout.; "Scout.com Team Recruiting Rankings". Scout.; "2026 Team Ranking". Rivals.

== Roster ==
2026–27 Portland State Vikings men's basketball team
Players
Coaches

Pos.	#	Name	Height	Weight	Year	Previous school	Hometown
G	0	Yaroslav Nikonov	6 ft 5 in (1.96 m)	210 lb (95 kg)	So	CSKA-2	Gelendzhik, Russia
G	1	Dennis Johnson III	6 ft 3 in (1.91 m)	190 lb (86 kg)	So	Western Washington	Seattle, Washington
F	2	Luke Kearney	6 ft 7 in (2.01 m)	215 lb (98 kg)	Sr	Utah State	Phoenix, Arizona
G	3	Koren Johnson	6 ft 1 in (1.85 m)	180 lb (82 kg)	RS Sr	Ole Miss	Seattle, Washington
G	4	Nehemiah Pollard	6 ft 4 in (1.93 m)	210 lb (95 kg)	Sr	Western Washington	Tacoma, Washington
G	5	Trevor Frank	6 ft 1 in (1.85 m)	185 lb (84 kg)	RS Sr	Dallas Baptist	Katy, Texas
F	6	Francesco Corato	6 ft 9 in (2.06 m)	225 lb (102 kg)	Fr	Reyer Venezia	Venice, Italy
F	7	Charles Chukwu	6 ft 9 in (2.06 m)	240 lb (109 kg)	RS Sr	Little Rock	Katy, Texas
G	8	Emil Skyttä	6 ft 5 in (1.96 m)	205 lb (93 kg)	RS Sr	North Dakota State	Helsinki, Finland
G	10	Colt Ness	6 ft 0 in (1.83 m)	170 lb (77 kg)	So	Tigard HS	Tigard, Oregon
F	12	Alexandros Skliros	6 ft 9 in (2.06 m)	240 lb (109 kg)	Fr	Promitheas Patras BC	Patras, Greece
C	17	KC Ibekwe	6 ft 11 in (2.11 m)	285 lb (129 kg)	GS	Pacific	Coquitlam, British Columbia, Canada
G	22	Gantas Križanauskas	6 ft 4 in (1.93 m)	205 lb (93 kg)	Fr	Rytas Vilnius	Vilnius, Lithuania
F	23	Jaquay Randolph	6 ft 10 in (2.08 m)	230 lb (104 kg)	Sr	Southern Wesleyan	Tallahassee, Florida
F	24	Antonio Pusateri	6 ft 7 in (2.01 m)	205 lb (93 kg)	Sr	Lubbock Christian	San Francisco, California
F	32	Brayden Barron	6 ft 6 in (1.98 m)	200 lb (91 kg)	So	Sam Barlow HS	Gresham, Oregon

Head coach

- Jase Coburn (Arizona State)

Assistant coach(es)

- Matt Dunn (Fort Hays State)
- Jamaal Williams (Washington)
- Mike Harmon (Northeastern State)
- Gabe Palmquist-Clark (Oregon)
- Will Graves (Southern Oregon)

Legend

- (C) Team captain
- (S) Suspended
- (I) Ineligible
- (W) Walk-on
- Injured
- Current redshirt

Roster

== Schedule and results ==
Date time, TV	Rank^{#}	Opponent^{#}	Result	Record	High points	High rebounds	High assists	Site (attendance) city, state
Exhibition
October 25, 2026*; 1:30 p.m.		at Nevada	L 71–77	-	23 – Nikonov	6 – Tied	6 – K. Johnson	Lawlor Events Center (2,394); Reno, NV
Regular season
November 2, 2026*; 7:30 p.m., ESPN+		Lewis & Clark	W 111–59	1–0	17 – Tied	8 – Ibekwe	8 – Krianauskas	Viking Pavilion (540); Portland, OR
November 7, 2026*; 7:00 p.m., ESPN+		at Seattle U	L 60–79	1–1	16 – Nikonov	10 – Randolph	2 – Kearney	Redhawk Center (999); Seattle, WA
November 11, 2026*; 6:00 p.m., Pac-12 YouTube		at Colorado State	L 71–87	1–2	23 – Randolph	18 – Randolph	5 – Nikonov	Moby Arena (4,168); Fort Collins, CO
November 14, 2026*; 4:00 p.m., ESPN+		at San Francisco	W 84–68	2–2	27 – Nikonov	11 – Randolph	7 – Nikonov	Sobrato Center (1,137); San Francisco, CA
November 16, 2026*; 7:00 p.m., ESPN+		at Saint Mary's	L 78–94	2–3	32 – Juzenas	8 – Juzenas	7 – Dent	University Credit Union Pavilion (2,716); Moraga, CA
November 19, 2026*; 7:00 p.m., ESPN+		Northwest Indian College	W 132–41	3–3	22 – Kearney	10 – Randolph	4 – Tied	Viking Pavilion (489); Portland, OR
November 22, 2026*; 2:00 p.m., ESPN+		Cal State Fullerton						Viking Pavilion; Portland, OR
November 25, 2026*; TBD, ESPN+		at UC Riverside						SRC Arena; Riverside, CA
November 28, 2026*; 4:00 p.m., ESPN+		at Southern Illinois						Banterra Center; Carbondale, IL
December 3, 2026; 7:00 p.m., ESPN+		Eastern Washington						Viking Pavilion; Portland, OR
December 5, 2026; 2:00 p.m., KPDX/ESPN+		Idaho						Viking Pavilion; Portland, OR
December 8, 2026*; 7:00 p.m., ESPN+		Evergreen						Viking Pavilion; Portland, OR
December 12, 2026*; 2:00 p.m., ESPN+		George Fox						Viking Pavilion; Portland, OR
December 20, 2026*; 1:30 p.m., Peacock		at Oregon						Matthew Knight Arena; Eugene, OR
December 31, 2026; 1:00 p.m., ESPN+		at Montana State						Worthington Arena; Bozeman, MT
January 2, 2027; 1:00 p.m., ESPN+		at Montana						Dahlberg Arena; Missoula, MT
January 7, 2027; 6:00 p.m., ESPN+		at Utah Tech						Burns Arena; St. George, UT
January 9, 2027; 5:30 p.m., ESPN+		at Southern Utah						America First Event Center; Cedar City, UT
January 14, 2027; 7:00 p.m., ESPN+		Weber State						Viking Pavilion; Portland, OR
January 16, 2027; 2:00 p.m., KPDX/ESPN+		Idaho State						Viking Pavilion; Portland, OR
January 21, 2027; 6:00 p.m., ESPN+		Northern Arizona						Viking Pavilion; Portland, OR
January 25, 2026; 5:00 p.m., ESPN+		at Northern Colorado						Bank of Colorado Arena; Greeley, CO
January 28, 2027; 6:00 p.m., ESPN+		at Idaho						ICCU Arena; Moscow, ID
January 30, 2027; 2:00 p.m., ESPN+		at Eastern Washington						Reese Court; Cheney, WA
February 4, 2027; 7:00 p.m., KPDX/ESPN+		Montana						Viking Pavilion; Portland, OR
February 6, 2027; 2:00 p.m., KPDX/ESPN+		Montana State						Viking Pavilion; Portland, OR
February 11, 2027; 6:00 p.m., ESPN+		at Idaho State						Reed Gym; Pocatello, ID
February 13, 2027; 3:00 p.m., ESPN+		at Weber State						Dee Events Center; Ogden, UT
February 18, 2027; 7:00 p.m., ESPN+		Southern Utah						Viking Pavilion; Portland, OR
February 20, 2027; 2:00 p.m., ESPN+		Utah Tech						Viking Pavilion; Portland, OR
February 22, 2027; 5:00 p.m., ESPN+		at Northern Arizona						Rolle Activity Center; Flagstaff, AZ
February 27, 2027; 2:00 p.m., ESPN+		Northern Colorado						Viking Pavilion; Portland, OR
Big Sky tournament
March 5, 2027; TBD, TBD		vs. TBD						Idaho Central Arena; Boise, ID
*Non-conference game. ^{#}Rankings from AP Poll. (#) Tournament seedings in parentheses. All times are in Pacific Time.
