= 2026–27 Montana State Bobcats men's basketball team =

American college basketball season

2026–27 Montana State Bobcats men's basketball
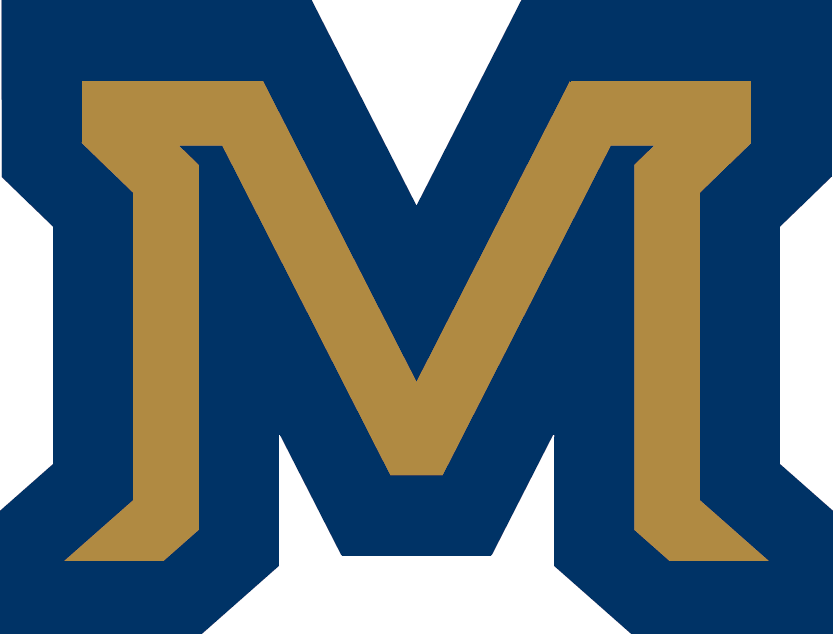
- Conference: Big Sky Conference
- Record: 2–3 (0–0 Big Sky)
- Head coach: Matt Logie (4th season)
- Associate head coach: Zach Payne (4th season); Sam Scholl (4th season)
- Assistant coaches: Xavier Bishop (3rd season); Shamrock Campbell (1st season); Kenny Love (1st season)
- Home arena: Worthington Arena (Capacity: 8,455)

2026–27 Big Sky men's basketball standings
	Conf.				Overall
Team	W		L	PCT	W		L	PCT
Southern Utah	0	–	0	–	3	–	2	.600
Idaho	0	–	0	–	2	–	2	.500
Montana State	0	–	0	–	2	–	2	.500
Northern Colorado	0	–	0	–	2	–	2	.500
Montana	0	–	0	–	2	–	3	.400
Portland State	0	–	0	–	2	–	3	.400
Eastern Washington	0	–	0	–	1	–	3	.250
Utah Tech	0	–	0	–	1	–	3	.250
Weber State	0	–	0	–	1	–	3	.250
Idaho State	0	–	0	–	0	–	4	.000
Northern Arizona	0	–	0	–	0	–	4	.000
† 2027 Big Sky tournament winner As of November 18, 2026; Rankings from AP poll

The 2026–27 Montana State Bobcats men's basketball team will represent Montana State University during the 2026–27 NCAA Division I men's basketball season. The Bobcats will be led by fourth-year head coach Matt Logie and will play their home games at Worthington Arena in Bozeman, Montana as a member of the Big Sky Conference.

== Previous season ==
Montana State finished the 2025-26 season 18–14, 12–6 in the Big Sky Conference to finish second in the conference. As the 2-seed in the Big Sky Tournament the Lumberjacks were defeated by 7-seed Idaho in the First round 74–78 to end their season.

== Offseason ==
=== Departures ===
Montana State Bobcats departures
Name	Number	Pos.	Height	Weight	Year	Hometown	Reason for departure
Davian Brown	0	G	6'3"	180	Graduate	Pasadena, CA	Out of eligibility
Patrick McMahon	1	G	6'7"	200	(redshirt) Senior	Palmer, AK	Out of eligibility
Grayson Gaddis	15	G	6'7"	215	(redshirt) Freshman	Salt Lake City, UT	Transferred to Utah
Chris Hodges	21	F	6'9"	240	Graduate	Schaumburg, IL	Out of eligibility

=== Incoming transfers ===
Montana State Bobcats incoming transfers
Name	Number	Pos.	Height	Weight	Year	Hometown	Previous School
Darnez Slater	0	G	6'3"	185	Junior	Eastvale, CA	Colorado State
Isaiah Crane	1	G	6'1"	180	Senior	Portland, OR	Carroll College
London Praytor	21	F	7'0"	220	Sophomore	Colorado Springs, CO	Toledo
Christian King	31	F	6'8"	210	Senior	Kirkland, WA	Washington

=== 2026 recruiting class ===
College recruiting
Name	Hometown	School	Height	Weight	Commit date
Hale Hansen; CG	Phoenix, AZ	Brophy College Prep	6 ft 5 in (1.96 m)	190 lb (86 kg)	Oct 14, 2025
Hale Hansen; CG	Recruit ratings: On3: (NR)				
DJ Johnson; CG	Auburn, WA	Auburn HS	6 ft 3 in (1.91 m)	170 lb (77 kg)	Oct 3, 2025
DJ Johnson; CG	Recruit ratings: 247Sports: (NR)				
Overall recruit ranking: Scout: – Rivals: –
Note: In many cases, Scout, Rivals, 247Sports, On3, and ESPN may conflict in their listings of height and weight.; In these cases, the average was taken. ESPN grades are on a 100-point scale.; Sources: "2026 Montana State Basketball Recruiting Commits". Scout.; "Scout.com Team Recruiting Rankings". Scout.; "2026 Team Ranking". Rivals.

== Roster ==
2026–27 Montana State Bobcats men's basketball team
Players
Coaches

Pos.	#	Name	Height	Weight	Year	Previous school	Hometown
G	0	Darnez Slater	6 ft 3 in (1.91 m)	185 lb (84 kg)	Jr	Colorado State	Eastvale, California
G	1	Isaiah Crane	6 ft 1 in (1.85 m)	180 lb (82 kg)	Sr	Carroll College	Portland, Oregon
G	2	Howie Keene	6 ft 7 in (2.01 m)	195 lb (88 kg)	So	The Woodlands Christian Academy	The Woodlands, Texas
G	3	CJ Purdie	6 ft 4 in (1.93 m)	185 lb (84 kg)	So	Combine Academy	Davidson, North Carolina
G	4	Cavin Holden	6 ft 2 in (1.88 m)	175 lb (79 kg)	Sr	Central Washington	Longview, Washington
G	5	Jeremiah Davis	6 ft 4 in (1.93 m)	185 lb (84 kg)	GS	Fullerton College	Compton, California
F	7	Hale Hansen	6 ft 5 in (1.96 m)	190 lb (86 kg)	Fr	Brophy College Prep	Phoenix, Arizona
G	11	DJ Johnson	6 ft 1 in (1.85 m)	170 lb (77 kg)	Fr	Auburn HS	Auburn, Washington
G	12	Seth Amunrud	6 ft 3 in (1.91 m)	175 lb (79 kg)	Sr	Dawson CC	Bozeman, Montana
F	14	James Steward	6 ft 8 in (2.03 m)	210 lb (95 kg)	So	Marcos de Niza HS	Chandler, Arizona
F	21	London Praytor	7 ft 0 in (2.13 m)	220 lb (100 kg)	So	Toledo	Colorado Springs, Colorado
F	22	Calum Rutherfurd	6 ft 11 in (2.11 m)	225 lb (102 kg)	Sr	Analy HS	Sebastopol, California
G	24	Jed Miller	6 ft 2 in (1.88 m)	185 lb (84 kg)	GS	SoCal Academy	Agoura Hills, California
F	31	Christian King	6 ft 8 in (2.03 m)	210 lb (95 kg)	Sr	Washington	Kirkland, Washington
F	35	Waka Mbatch	6 ft 10 in (2.08 m)	225 lb (102 kg)	Sr	Florida State	Serekunda, The Gambia
F	44	Jaden Steppe	6 ft 8 in (2.03 m)	220 lb (100 kg)	Jr	Colorado State	Tualatin, Oregon

Head coach

- Matt Logie (Lehigh)

Assistant coach(es)

- Zach Payne (Whitworth)
- Sam Scholl (San Diego)
- Xavier Bishop (Montana State)
- Shamrock Campbell (Carroll College)
- Kenny Love (Whitworth)

Legend

- (C) Team captain
- (S) Suspended
- (I) Ineligible
- (W) Walk-on
- Injured
- Current redshirt

Roster

== Schedule and results ==
Date time, TV	Rank^{#}	Opponent^{#}	Result	Record	High points	High rebounds	High assists	Site (attendance) city, state
Exhibition
October 24, 2026*; 10:30 a.m.		at Kansas City	L 54–64		11 – Steward	14 – Steward	3 – Slater	Municipal Auditorium; Kansas City, MO
Regular season
November 2, 2026*; 8:00 p.m., Pac-12 YouTube		at Colorado State	L 74–84	0–1	17 – Davis	7 – King	4 – Holden	Moby Arena (4,479); Fort Collins, CO
November 7, 2026*; 1:00 p.m., ESPN+		Long Beach State	W 83–70	1–1	17 – Davis	10 – Davis	3 – Davis	Worthington Arena (2,541); Bozeman, MT
November 12, 2026*; 7:00 p.m., ESPN+		at No. 23 BYU	L 71–86	1–2	14 – Tied	5 – Tied	6 – Holden	Marriott Center (17,561); Provo, UT
November 15, 2026*; 4:00 p.m., ESPN+		Cal Poly	W 77–52	2–2	18 – King	6 – Praytor	5 – Miller	Worthington Arena (2,965); Bozeman, MT
November 17, 2026*; 9:00 p.m., CBSSN		at No. 22 Gonzaga	L 62–74	2–3	23 – Holden	6 – Miller	3 – Steppe	McCarthey Athletic Center (6,000); Spokane, WA
November 19, 2026*; 5:00 p.m., ESPN+		at High Point						Qubein Center; High Point, NC
November 25, 2026*; 7:00 p.m., ESPN+		Northwest Indian College						Worthington Arena; Bozeman, MT
November 30, 2026*; 6:00 p.m., SLN		at South Dakota						Sanford Coyote Sports Center; Vermillion, SD
December 5, 2026; 6:00 p.m., ESPN+		at Northern Arizona						Rolle Activity Center; Flagstaff, AZ
December 7, 2026*; 7:00 p.m., ESPN+		West Coast Baptist						Worthington Arena; Bozeman, MT
December 11, 2026*; 8:00 p.m., YouTube		at San Diego State						Viejas Arena; San Diego, CA
December 20, 2026*; 4:00 p.m., ESPN+		North Dakota						Worthington Arena; Bozeman, MT
December 22, 2026*; 1:00 p.m., ESPN+		Northwest						Worthington Arena; Bozeman, MT
December 31, 2026; 2:00 p.m., ESPN+		Portland State						Worthington Arena; Bozeman, MT
January 2, 2027; 6:00 p.m., ESPN+		Northern Colorado						Worthington Arena; Bozeman, MT
January 7, 2027; 7:00 p.m., ESPN+		at Idaho State						Reed Gym; Pocatello, ID
January 9, 2027; 4:00 p.m., ESPN+		at Weber State						Dee Events Center; Ogden, UT
January 14, 2027; 7:00 p.m., ESPN+		Eastern Washington						Worthington Arena; Bozeman, MT
January 16, 2027; 2:00 p.m., ESPN+		Idaho						Worthington Arena; Bozeman, MT
January 18, 2027; 6:30 p.m., ESPN+		at Southern Utah						America First Event Center; Cedar City, UT
January 23, 2027; 7:00 p.m., ESPN+		Montana; Rivalry						Worthington Arena; Bozeman, MT
January 25, 2027; 6:00 p.m., ESPN+		Utah Tech						Worthington Arena; Bozeman, MT
January 28, 2027; 7:00 p.m., ESPN+		Northern Arizona						Worthington Arena; Bozeman, MT
February 4, 2027; 6:00 p.m., ESPN+		at Northern Colorado						Bank of Colorado Arena; Greeley, CO
February 6, 2027; 3:00 p.m., ESPN+		at Portland State						Viking Pavilion; Portland, OR
February 11, 2027; 7:00 p.m., ESPN+		at Idaho						ICCU Arena; Moscow, ID
February 13, 2027; 3:00 p.m., ESPN+		at Eastern Washington						Reese Court; Cheney, WA
February 18, 2027; 7:00 p.m., ESPN+		Weber State						Worthington Arena; Bozeman, MT
February 20, 2027; 6:00 p.m., ESPN+		Idaho State						Worthington Arena; Bozeman, MT
February 22, 2027; 7:00 p.m., ESPN+		Southern Utah						Worthington Arena; Bozeman, MT
February 27, 2027; 7:00 p.m., ESPN+		at Montana; Rivalry						Dahlberg Arena; Missoula, MT
March 1, 2027; 7:00 p.m., ESPN+		at Utah Tech						Burns Arena; St. George, UT
Big Sky tournament
March 5, 2027; TBD, TBD		vs. TBD						Idaho Central Arena; Boise, ID
*Non-conference game. ^{#}Rankings from AP Poll. (#) Tournament seedings in parentheses. All times are in Mountain Time.
