= Shane Burcar =

American college basketball coach (born 1972)

Current position
- Title: Head coach
- Team: Northern Arizona
- Conference: Big Sky Conference
- Record: 86–138 (.384)

Biographical details
- Born: September 19, 1972 (age 54); Hancock, Michigan, U.S.
- Education: Ottawa University (2004)

Coaching career (HC unless noted)
- 2006–2018: Mesa HS
- 2018–2019: Northern Arizona (assistant)
- 2019–2020: Northern Arizona (interim HC)
- 2020-present: Northern Arizona

Head coaching record
- Overall: College: 86–138 (.384); High School: 277–110 (.716)
- Tournaments: 0–1 (CBI)

Shane Anthony Burcar (born September 19, 1972) is the current head coach of the Northern Arizona Lumberjacks men's basketball team.

== Coaching career ==
Burcar began his coaching in the high school ranks, highlighted by a 12-year tenure as the head boys basketball coach at Mesa High School, where he compiled a 277–110 overall record with seven regular-season regional titles, and an Arizona Division I state title in 2016.

In 2018, he joined Jack Murphy's staff at Northern Arizona. The following season when Murphy left the Lumberjacks for an assistant coaching position at Arizona, Burcar stepped in as the interim head coach for the 2019–20 season. After guiding the team to a 16–14 record (NAU's best record since 2015), Burcar was named the permanent head coach on March 25, 2020.

== Head coaching record ==
Record table
Season	Team	Overall	Conference	Standing	Postseason
Northern Arizona Lumberjacks (Big Sky Conference) (2019–present)
2019–20	Northern Arizona	16–14	10–10	5th	
2020–21	Northern Arizona	6–16	4–10	10th	
2021–22	Northern Arizona	9–23	5–15	T–10th	
2022–23	Northern Arizona	12–23	5–13	9th	
2023–24	Northern Arizona	14–19	7–11	T–7th	
2024–25	Northern Arizona	18–16	8–10	T–6th	CBI First Round
2025–26	Northern Arizona	10–22	4–14	10th	
2026–27	Northern Arizona	1–5	0–0		
Northern Arizona:		86–138 (.384)	43–84 (.339)		
Total:		86–138 (.384)			
National champion Postseason invitational champion Conference regular season champion Conference regular season and conference tournament champion Division regular season champion Division regular season and conference tournament champion Conference tournament champion
