= 2026–27 Northern Arizona Lumberjacks men's basketball team =

American college basketball season

2026–27 Northern Arizona Lumberjacks men's basketball
- Conference: Big Sky Conference
- Record: 0–4 (0–0 Big Sky)
- Head coach: Shane Burcar (8th season)
- Associate head coach: Ben Johnson (1st season)
- Assistant coaches: Tim Russo (4th season); Nik Mains (4th season)
- Home arena: Rolle Activity Center (Capacity: 1,210)

2026–27 Big Sky men's basketball standings
	Conf.				Overall
Team	W		L	PCT	W		L	PCT
Southern Utah	0	–	0	–	3	–	1	.750
Northern Colorado	0	–	0	–	2	–	1	.667
Idaho	0	–	0	–	2	–	2	.500
Montana	0	–	0	–	1	–	2	.333
Montana State	0	–	0	–	1	–	2	.333
Portland State	0	–	0	–	1	–	2	.333
Utah Tech	0	–	0	–	1	–	2	.333
Eastern Washington	0	–	0	–	1	–	3	.250
Idaho State	0	–	0	–	0	–	3	.000
Weber State	0	–	0	–	0	–	3	.000
Northern Arizona	0	–	0	–	0	–	4	.000
† 2027 Big Sky tournament winner As of November 14, 2026; Rankings from AP poll

The 2026–27 Northern Arizona Lumberjacks men's basketball team will represent Northern Arizona University during the 2026–27 NCAA Division I men's basketball season. The Lumberjacks will be led by eighth-year head coach Shane Burcar and will play their home games at Rolle Activity Center in Flagstaff, Arizona as a member of the Big Sky Conference. This will mark Northern Arizona's first season playing full-time at Rolle Activity Center after using the arena part-time while calling Walkup Skydome their permanent home for the past forty-nine seasons.

== Previous season ==
Northern Arizona finished the 2025-26 season 10–22, 4–14 in the Big Sky Conference to finish tenth in the conference. As the 10-seed in the Big Sky Tournament the Lumberjacks were defeated by 9-seed Idaho State in the First round 65–73 to end their season.

== Offseason ==
=== Departures ===
Northern Arizona Lumberjacks departures
Name	Number	Pos.	Height	Weight	Year	Hometown	Reason for departure
Traivar Jackson	3	F	6'7"	215	Graduate	Anchorage, AK	Out of eligibility
Oakland Fort	4	G	5'10"	170	Senior	Phoenix, AZ	Out of eligibility
Zack Davidson	5	G	6'9"	225	(redshirt) Sophomore	Mission Viejo, CA	Departed program
Walker Timme	8	F	6'7"	225	(redshirt) Junior	Richardson, TX	Transferred to Alaska Anchorage
Karl Poom	9	F	6'8"	230	Sophomore	Tartu, Estonia	Transferred to North Dakota State
Diego Campisano	12	F	6'6"	205	(redshirt) Senior	San Diego, CA	Out of eligibility
Kavon Bradford	22	G	6'1"	180	Sophomore	Portland, OR	Transferred to Western Oregon
Isaiah Shaw	24	G	6'8"	200	(redshirt) Junior	Gilbert, AZ	Transferred to UConn
Arne Osojnik	44	G	6'6"	200	Junior	Ljubljana, Slovenia	Departed program
Erez Poran	82	F	6'6"	200	Freshman	Kfar Vradim, Israel	Departed program

=== Incoming transfers ===
Northern Arizona Lumberjacks incoming transfers
Name	Number	Pos.	Height	Weight	Year	Hometown	Previous School
Mason Dorsey	0	G	6'4''	195	(redshirt) Junior	Los Angeles, CA	College of the Sequoias
Luke Wieskamp	3	F	6'6"	205	Sophomore	Phoenix, AZ	Menlo
Dylan Anderson	4	F	7'0"	225	(redshirt) Senior	Chandler, AZ	Murray State
Tamiel Green	6	F/C	6'10"	275	Sophomore	Atlanta, GA	Indian River State College
Max Majerle	7	G	6'4''	200	(redshirt) Senior	Scottsdale, AZ	North Dakota State
Cade Bennett	22	G	6'0''	170	(redshirt) Senior	Moraga, CA	Saint Mary's
Nana Keutcha	31	C	6'10"	220	Junior	Yaoundé, Cameroon	Colby CC
Zach Tanner	33	F	6'9''	205	(redshirt) Freshman	Salt Lake City, UT	Utah State Eastern

=== 2026 recruiting class ===
College recruiting
Name	Hometown	School	Height	Weight	Commit date
Noah George; CG	Phoenix, AZ	Bella Vista College Prep	6 ft 3 in (1.91 m)	170 lb (77 kg)	Nov 16, 2025
Noah George; CG	Recruit ratings: On3: (NR)				
Johnny Mautz; CG	St. Michaels, MD	St. Michaels High School	6 ft 2 in (1.88 m)	175 lb (79 kg)	May 11, 2026
Johnny Mautz; CG	Recruit ratings: (NR)				
Lucas Toukam; PF	Phoenix, AZ	Bella Vista College Prep	6 ft 7 in (2.01 m)	210 lb (95 kg)	Feb 10, 2026
Lucas Toukam; PF	Recruit ratings: On3: ESPN: (80)				
Overall recruit ranking: Scout: – Rivals: –
Note: In many cases, Scout, Rivals, 247Sports, On3, and ESPN may conflict in their listings of height and weight.; In these cases, the average was taken. ESPN grades are on a 100-point scale.; Sources: "2026 Northern Arizona Basketball Recruiting Commits". Scout.; "Scout.com Team Recruiting Rankings". Scout.; "2026 Team Ranking". Rivals.

== Roster ==
2026–27 Northern Arizona Lumberjacks men's basketball team
Players
Coaches

Pos.	#	Name	Height	Weight	Year	Previous school	Hometown
G	0	Mason Dorsey	6 ft 4 in (1.93 m)	195 lb (88 kg)	RS Jr	College of the Sequoias	Los Angeles, California
F	1	Lucas Toukam	6 ft 8 in (2.03 m)	205 lb (93 kg)	Fr	Bella Vista College Prep	Bafoussam, Cameroon
G	2	Chris Komin	6 ft 3 in (1.91 m)	165 lb (75 kg)	So	St. John Bosco HS	Cypress, California
F	3	Luke Wieskamp	6 ft 6 in (1.98 m)	205 lb (93 kg)	So	Menlo	Phoenix, Arizona
F	4	Dylan Anderson	7 ft 0 in (2.13 m)	225 lb (102 kg)	RS Sr	Murray State	Chandler, Arizona
G	5	Brennan Peterson	6 ft 0 in (1.83 m)	165 lb (75 kg)	So	Dream City Christian	Scottsdale, Arizona
F/C	6	Tamiel Green	6 ft 10 in (2.08 m)	275 lb (125 kg)	So	Indian River State College	Atlanta, Georgia
G	7	Max Majerle	6 ft 4 in (1.93 m)	200 lb (91 kg)	RS Sr	North Dakota State	Scottsdale, Arizona
G	11	Ryan Abelman	6 ft 4 in (1.93 m)	210 lb (95 kg)	RS Sr	Bishop Gorman HS	Las Vegas, Nevada
G	22	Cade Bennett	6 ft 0 in (1.83 m)	170 lb (77 kg)	RS Sr	Saint Mary's	Moraga, California
G	23	Noah George	6 ft 2 in (1.88 m)	185 lb (84 kg)	Fr	Bella Vista College Prep	Malton, Ontario, Canada
G	30	JT Amundsen	5 ft 8 in (1.73 m)	165 lb (75 kg)	So	Millennium HS	Goodyear, Arizona
C	31	Nana Keutcha	6 ft 10 in (2.08 m)	220 lb (100 kg)	Jr	Colby CC	Yaoundé, Cameroon
F	33	Zach Tanner	6 ft 9 in (2.06 m)	205 lb (93 kg)	RS Fr	Utah State Eastern	Salt Lake City, Utah
G	35	Johnny Mautz	6 ft 1 in (1.85 m)	185 lb (84 kg)	Fr	St. Michaels HS	St. Michaels, Maryland

Head coach

- Shane Burcar (Ottawa Arizona)

Assistant coach(es)

- Ben Johnson (Green Bay)
- Tim Russo (Tampa)
- Nik Mains (Northern Arizona)

Legend

- (C) Team captain
- (S) Suspended
- (I) Ineligible
- (W) Walk-on
- Injured
- Current redshirt

Roster

== Schedule and results ==
Date time, TV	Rank^{#}	Opponent^{#}	Result	Record	High points	High rebounds	High assists	Site (attendance) city, state
Non-conference regular season
November 3, 2026*; 8:00 p.m., MW+		at UNLV	L 77–89	0–1	24 – Komin	6 – Green	4 – Dorsey	Thomas & Mack Center (5,109); Paradise, NV
November 7, 2026*; 4:00 p.m., MW+		at New Mexico	L 65–94	0–2	21 – Komin	7 – Toukam	6 – Koman	The Pit (11,861); Albuquerque, NM
November 10, 2026*; 7:00 p.m., ESPN+		at No. 12 Arizona	L 59–90	0–3	17 – Komin	7 – Toukam	5 – Komin	McKale Center (14,041); Tucson, AZ
November 13, 2026*; 5:00 p.m., SEC+		at No. 24 Kentucky	L 77–78	0–4	25 – Komin	6 – Toukam	6 – Komin	Rupp Arena (19,459); Lexington, KY
November 17, 2026*; 6:00 p.m., ESPN+		Embry–Riddle Prescott						Rolle Activity Center; Flagstaff, AZ
November 21, 2026*; 5:00 p.m., ESPN+		at Cal Poly						Mott Athletics Center; San Luis Obispo, CA
November 28, 2026*; 3:00 p.m., ESPN+		at Cal State Bakersfield						Icardo Center; Bakersfield, CA
December 3, 2026; 6:00 p.m., ESPN+		Montana						Rolle Activity Center; Flagstaff, AZ
December 5, 2026; 6:00 p.m., ESPN+		Montana State						Rolle Activity Center; Flagstaff, AZ
December 10, 2026*; 6:00 p.m., ESPN+		Nelson						Rolle Activity Center; Flagstaff, AZ
December 14, 2026*; 11:00 a.m., ESPN+		Justice						Rolle Activity Center; Flagstaff, AZ
December 16, 2026*; 5:00 p.m., ESPN+		at West Virginia						Hope Coliseum; Morgantown, WV
December 21, 2026*; 4:00 p.m., ESPN+		at Iowa State						Hilton Coliseum; Ames, IA
December 28, 2026*; 6:00 p.m., ESPN+		Benedictine Mesa						Rolle Activity Center; Flagstaff, AZ
December 31, 2026; 2:00 p.m., ESPN+		at Weber State						Dee Events Center; Ogden, UT
January 2, 2027; 4:00 p.m., ESPN+		at Idaho State						Reed Gym; Pocatello, ID
January 7, 2027; 7:00 p.m., ESPN+		at Eastern Washington						Reese Court; Cheney, WA
January 9, 2027; 3:00 p.m., ESPN+		at Idaho						ICCU Arena; Moscow, ID
January 14, 2027; 6:00 p.m., ESPN+		Utah Tech						Rolle Activity Center; Flagstaff, AZ
January 21, 2027; 8:00 p.m., ESPN+		at Portland State						Viking Pavilion; Portland, OR
January 23, 2027; 6:00 p.m., ESPN+		Northern Colorado						Rolle Activity Center; Flagstaff, AZ
January 28, 2027; 7:00 p.m., ESPN+		at Montana State						Worthington Arena; Bozeman, MT
January 30, 2027; 4:00 p.m., ESPN+		at Montana						Dahlberg Arena; Missoula, MT
February 4, 2027; 6:00 p.m., ESPN+		Idaho State						Rolle Activity Center; Flagstaff, AZ
February 6, 2027; 6:00 p.m., ESPN+		Weber State						Rolle Activity Center; Flagstaff, AZ
February 8, 2027; 6:00 p.m., ESPN+		Southern Utah						Rolle Activity Center; Flagstaff, AZ
February 11, 2027; 7:00 p.m., ESPN+		at Utah Tech						Burns Arena; St. George, UT
February 18, 2027; 6:00 p.m., ESPN+		Idaho						Rolle Activity Center; Flagstaff, AZ
February 20, 2027; 6:00 p.m., ESPN+		Eastern Washington						Rolle Activity Center; Flagstaff, AZ
February 22, 2027; 6:00 p.m., ESPN+		Portland State						Rolle Activity Center; Flagstaff, AZ
February 27, 2027; 6:30 p.m., ESPN+		at Southern Utah						America First Event Center; Cedar City, UT
March 1, 2027; 6:00 p.m., ESPN+		at Northern Colorado						Bank of Colorado Arena; Greeley, CO
Big Sky tournament
March 5, 2027; TBD, TBD		vs. TBD						Idaho Central Arena; Boise, ID
*Non-conference game. ^{#}Rankings from AP Poll. (#) Tournament seedings in parentheses. All times are in Mountain Time.
