= Northern Arizona Lumberjacks men's basketball =

Overview of the sports team

2026–27 Northern Arizona Lumberjacks men's basketball team
- University: Big Sky
- Head coach: Shane Burcar (8th season)
- Location: Flagstaff, Arizona
- Arena: Walkup Skydome (capacity: 11,230 Student section = “The Jack Pack”)
- Colors: Blue and gold

NCAA Division I tournament appearances
- 1998, 2000

Conference tournament champions
- 1998, 2000

Conference regular-season champions
- 1986, 1997, 1998, 2006

The Northern Arizona Lumberjacks men's basketball team represents Northern Arizona University, located in Flagstaff, Arizona, in NCAA Division I men's competition. The school's team has competed in the Big Sky Conference since 1970. The team's most recent appearance in the NCAA Division I men's basketball tournament was in 2000. Northern Arizona also appeared in the NCAA tournament in 1998.

In 2023, the Lumberjacks reached the Big Sky conference tournament title game as a Cinderella team as they were the 9th seed in the tournament. The Lumberjacks are currently led by head coach Shane Burcar who replaced Jack Murphy in June 2019. NAU Lumberjack basketball games are broadcast on KAFF Country Legends 93.5/AM 930 in Flagstaff, Fun Oldies 1450 AM/100.9 in Prescott and KDUS AM 1060 in Phoenix, with commentary provided by the "Voice of the Lumberjacks" Mitch Strohman, Coach Dave Brown with the play-by-play and Dave Zorn, host of the NAU Halftime Report. All games can be also heard online at KAFFLegends.com

== Postseason ==
=== NCAA tournament results ===
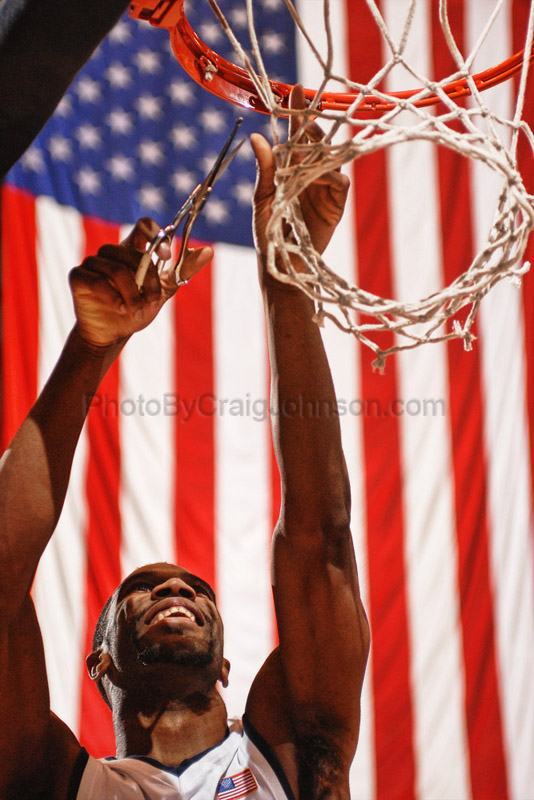
Ruben Boykin takes down the nets at the Walkup Skydome to celebrate after 2007 conference win

The Lumberjacks have appeared in two NCAA Tournaments, with a combined record of 0–2.

Year	Seed	Round	Opponent	Result
1998	15 W	Round of 64	(2) #9 Cincinnati	L 62–65
2000	15 W	Round of 64	(2) #8 St. John's	L 56–61

=== NIT results ===
The Lumberjacks have appeared in the National Invitation Tournament (NIT) three times, with a combined record of 0–3.

Year	Round	Opponent	Result
1986	First Round	Louisiana Tech	L 61–67
1997	First Round	Arkansas	L 74–101
2006	First Round	Delaware State	L 53–58

=== CBI results ===
The Lumberjacks have participated in one College Basketball Invitational (CBI) tournament. Their record is 0–1.

Year	Round	Opponent	Result
2025	First Round	Queens (NC)	L 78–85

=== CIT results ===
The Lumberjacks have appeared in the CollegeInsider.com Postseason Tournament (CIT) twice, with a combined record of 4–2.

Year	Round	Opponent	Result
2011	First Round	Santa Clara	L 63–68
2015	First Round; Second Round; Quarterfinals; Semifinals; Championship	Grand Canyon; Sacramento State; Kent State; NJIT; Evansville	W 75–70; W 78–73; W 74–73 ^{OT} W 68–61; L 65–71

=== NAIA Tournament results ===
The Lumberjacks have appeared in the NAIA Tournament four times, with a combined record of 7–4.

Year	Round	Opponent	Result
1946	First Round; Second Round	Rockhurst; Loyola (LA)	W 45–37; L 50–56 ^{OT}
1947	First Round; Second Round; Quarterfinals; Semifinals; National 3rd Place	Youngstown State; Houston; Northeast Missouri State; Mankato State; Emporia State	W 49–45 ^{OT} W 44–42; W 59–55; L 46–52; W 47–38
1954	First Round	Rio Grande	L 74–90
1962	First Round; Second Round; Quarterfinals	Buena Vista; Savannah State; Prairie View A&M	W 95–73; W 95–91; L 48–86
