= 2026–27 Montana Grizzlies basketball team =

American college basketball season

2026–27 Montana Grizzlies basketball
- Conference: Big Sky Conference
- Record: 0–0 (0–0 Big Sky)
- Head coach: Travis DeCuire (13th season)
- Assistant coaches: Rachi Wortham (2nd, 6th overall season); Ryan Frazer (2nd season); Mikey Eggleton (1st season)
- Home arena: Dahlberg Arena (Capacity: 7,321)

2026–27 Big Sky men's basketball standings
	Conf.				Overall
Team	W		L	PCT	W		L	PCT
Southern Utah	0	–	0	–	3	–	0	1.000
Idaho	0	–	0	–	1	–	1	.500
Montana	0	–	0	–	1	–	1	.500
Montana State	0	–	0	–	1	–	1	.500
Northern Colorado	0	–	0	–	1	–	1	.500
Portland State	0	–	0	–	1	–	1	.500
Utah Tech	0	–	0	–	1	–	1	.500
Eastern Washington	0	–	0	–	0	–	2	.000
Idaho State	0	–	0	–	0	–	2	.000
Northern Arizona	0	–	0	–	0	–	2	.000
Weber State	0	–	0	–	0	–	2	.000
† 2027 Big Sky tournament winner As of November 8, 2026; Rankings from AP poll

The 2026–27 Montana Grizzlies basketball team will represent the University of Montana during the 2026–27 NCAA Division I men's basketball season. The Grizzlies will be led by thirteenth-year head coach Travis DeCuire and will play their home games at Dahlberg Arena in Missoula, Montana as a member of the Big Sky Conference.

== Previous season ==
Montana finished the 2025-26 season 18–16, 10–8 in the Big Sky Conference to finish tied for fourth in the conference. As the 4-seed in the Big Sky Tournament the Grizzlies defeated 5-seed Northern Colorado in the First round and top-seed Portland State to advance to the Championship. Montana would fall to 7-seed Idaho in the Championship 66–77 to end their season.

== Offseason ==
=== Departures ===
Montana Grizzlies departures
Name	Number	Pos.	Height	Weight	Year	Hometown	Reason for departure
Money Williams	0	G	6'4"	211	Junior	Oakland, CA	Transferred to Boston College
Trae Taylor	1	F	6'9"	207	Senior	San Diego, CA	Out of eligibility
Chase Henderson	2	G	6'0"	172	(redshirt) Sophomore	Des Moines, IA	Transferred to Cal Poly Humboldt
Brooklyn Hicks	3	G	6'3"	186	Junior	Seattle, WA	Transferred to Cal State Northridge
Kadyn Betts	7	F	6'8"	219	(redshirt) Junior	Pueblo, CO	Transferred to Nebraska
Tyler Isaak	8	G	6'4"	190	Junior	Danville, CA	Transferred to Concordia-Irvine
Grant Kepley	11	G	6'4"	180	(redshirt) Sophomore	Bellingham, WA	Transferred to Western Washington
Luke Moxon	22	G	6'3"	210	Freshman	Arcata, CA	Entered transfer portal
Te'Jon Sawyer	32	F	6'8"	255	Graduate	San Francisco, CA	Out of eligibility

=== Incoming transfers ===
Montana Grizzlies incoming transfers
Name	Number	Pos.	Height	Weight	Year	Hometown	Previous School
Jalen Brown	0	G	6'2"	186	Senior	Salinas, CA	Cal State Dominguez Hills
Josiah Sanders	1	F	6'7"	223	Senior	Phoenix, AZ	Cal State Dominguez Hills
Jordan Clark	3	G	6'2"	192	Senior	Seattle, WA	Central Washington
Noah Bendinger	7	G	6'4"	173	Sophomore	Draper, UT	Boise State
LoLo Rudolph	8	G	6'2"	187	Junior	San Diego, CA	Hutchinson CC
Clayton Mpiana	21	F	6'5"	230	Sophomore	Birmingham, United Kingdom	Pacific
Garret Dutro	22	G	6'6"	196	Senior	Auburn, CA	Sierra College

=== 2026 recruiting class ===
College recruiting
Name	Hometown	School	Height	Weight	Commit date
Semaj Carter; SG	Moreno Valley, CA	Rancho Verde HS	6 ft 4 in (1.93 m)	N/A	Sep 14, 2025
Semaj Carter; SG	Recruit ratings: (NR)				
Jackson Haggins; CG	Riverside, CA	Eleanor Roosevelt HS	6 ft 2 in (1.88 m)	N/A	Oct 17, 2025
Jackson Haggins; CG	Recruit ratings: (NR)				
Seven Pridgen; CG	Worcester, MA	The Governor's Academy	6 ft 3 in (1.91 m)	N/A	Aug 8, 2025
Seven Pridgen; CG	Recruit ratings: (NR)				
Overall recruit ranking: Scout: – Rivals: –
Note: In many cases, Scout, Rivals, 247Sports, On3, and ESPN may conflict in their listings of height and weight.; In these cases, the average was taken. ESPN grades are on a 100-point scale.; Sources: "2026 Montana Basketball Recruiting Commits". Scout.; "Scout.com Team Recruiting Rankings". Scout.; "2026 Team Ranking". Rivals.

== Roster ==
2026–27 Montana Grizzlies men's basketball team
Players
Coaches

Pos.	#	Name	Height	Weight	Year	Previous school	Hometown
G	0	Jalen Brown	6 ft 2 in (1.88 m)	186 lb (84 kg)	Sr	Cal State Dominguez Hills	Salinas, California
F	1	Josiah Sanders	6 ft 7 in (2.01 m)	223 lb (101 kg)	Sr	Cal State Dominguez Hills	Phoenix, Arizona
G	2	Tyler Thompson	6 ft 6 in (1.98 m)	204 lb (93 kg)	Jr	Vanden HS	Fairfield, California
G	3	Jordan Clark	6 ft 2 in (1.88 m)	192 lb (87 kg)	Sr	Central Washington	Seattle, Washington
G	4	Jackson Haggins	6 ft 2 in (1.88 m)	198 lb (90 kg)	Fr	Eleanor Roosevelt HS	Riverside, California
F	5	Amari Jedkins	6 ft 8 in (2.03 m)	202 lb (92 kg)	Sr	Green Bay	Racine, Wisconsin
G	7	Noah Bendinger	6 ft 4 in (1.93 m)	173 lb (78 kg)	So	Boise State	Draper, Utah
G	8	LoLo Rudolph	6 ft 2 in (1.88 m)	187 lb (85 kg)	Jr	Hutchinson CC	San Diego, California
G	9	Seven Pridgen	6 ft 3 in (1.91 m)	186 lb (84 kg)	Fr	The Governor's Academy	Worcester, Massachusetts
G	10	Connor Dick	6 ft 4 in (1.93 m)	201 lb (91 kg)	Sr	Hellgate HS	Missoula, Montana
G	11	Semaj Carter	6 ft 4 in (1.93 m)	205 lb (93 kg)	Fr	Rancho Verde HS	Compton, California
G	13	Courtney Anderson Jr.	6 ft 9 in (2.06 m)	203 lb (92 kg)	Sr	Colorado	Vallejo, California
F	21	Clayton Mpiana	6 ft 5 in (1.96 m)	230 lb (104 kg)	So	Pacific	Birmingham, United Kingdom
G	22	Garret Dutro	6 ft 6 in (1.98 m)	196 lb (89 kg)	Sr	Sierra College	Auburn, California
F	24	Kenyon Aguino	6 ft 8 in (2.03 m)	229 lb (104 kg)	So	Volcano Vista HS	Albuquerque, New Mexico

Head coach

- Travis DeCuire (Montana)

Assistant coach(es)

- Rachi Wortham (Eastern Washington)
- Ryan Frazer (Azusa Pacific)
- Mikey Eggleton (Menlo College)

Legend

- (C) Team captain
- (S) Suspended
- (I) Ineligible
- (W) Walk-on
- Injured
- Current redshirt

Roster

== Schedule and results ==
Date time, TV	Rank^{#}	Opponent^{#}	Result	Record	High points	High rebounds	High assists	Site (attendance) city, state
Exhibition
October 24, 2026*; 7:00 p.m.		Cal State Bakersfield	W 84-78		20 – Brown	10 – Mpiana	7 – Clark	Dahlberg Arena; Missoula, MT
Regular season
November 2, 2026*; 8:00 p.m., BTN		at Oregon						Matthew Knight Arena; Eugene, OR
November 7, 2026*; 7:00 p.m., ESPN+		Salish Kootenai						Dahlberg Arena; Missoula, MT
November 10, 2026*; 8:00 p.m., ESPN+		at San Francisco						Sobrato Center; San Francisco, CA
November 14, 2026*; 11:00 a.m., SLN		at North Dakota						Betty Engelstad Sioux Center; Grand Forks, ND
November 16, 2026*; 6:00 p.m., ESPN+		at Kansas State						Bramlage Coliseum; Manhattan, KS
November 23, 2026*; 7:00 p.m., ESPN+		Carroll						Dahlberg Arena; Missoula, MT
November 30, 2026*; 7:00 p.m., ESPN+		at Arizona State						Desert Financial Arena; Tempe, AZ
December 3, 2026; 6:00 p.m., ESPN+		at Northern Arizona						Rolle Activity Center; Flagstaff, AZ
December 5, 2026*; 4:30 p.m., CW		at Utah State						Smith Spectrum; Logan, UT
December 8, 2026*; 7:00 p.m., ESPN+		South Dakota						Dahlberg Arena; Missoula, MT
December 12, 2026*; 3:30 p.m., ESPN+		at Cal Poly						Mott Athletics Center; San Luis Obispo, CA
December 18, 2026*; 7:00 p.m., ESPN+		Pepperdine						Dahlberg Arena; Missoula, MT
December 21, 2026*; 7:00 p.m., ESPN+		Providence (Montana)						Dahlberg Arena; Missoula, MT
December 31, 2026; 4:00 p.m., ESPN+		Northern Colorado						Dahlberg Arena; Missoula, MT
January 2, 2027; 2:00 p.m., ESPN+		Portland State						Dahlberg Arena; Missoula, MT
January 7, 2027; 6:00 p.m., ESPN+		at Weber State						Dee Events Center; Ogden, UT
January 9, 2027; 4:00 p.m., ESPN+		at Idaho State						Reed Gym; Pocatello, ID
January 14, 2027; 7:00 p.m., ESPN+		Idaho						Dahlberg Arena; Missoula, MT
January 16, 2027; 4:00 p.m., ESPN+		Eastern Washington						Dahlberg Arena; Missoula, MT
January 18, 2027; 7:00 p.m., ESPN+		at Utah Tech						Burns Arena; St. George, UT
January 23, 2027; 7:00 p.m., ESPN+		at Montana State; Rivalry						Worthington Arena; Bozeman, MT
January 25, 2027; 7:00 p.m., ESPN+		Southern Utah						Dahlberg Arena; Missoula, MT
January 30, 2027; 4:00 p.m., ESPN+		Northern Arizona						Dahlberg Arena; Missoula, MT
February 4, 2027; 8:00 p.m., ESPN+		at Portland State						Viking Pavilion; Portland, OR
February 6, 2027; 6:00 p.m., ESPN+		at Northern Colorado						Bank of Colorado Arena; Greeley, CO
February 11, 2027; 7:00 p.m., ESPN+		at Eastern Washington						Reese Court; Cheney, WA
February 13, 2027; 3:00 p.m., ESPN+		at Idaho						ICCU Arena; Moscow, ID
February 18, 2027; 7:00 p.m., ESPN+		Idaho State						Dahlberg Arena; Missoula, MT
February 20, 2027; 4:00 p.m., ESPN+		Weber State						Dahlberg Arena; Missoula, MT
February 22, 2027; 7:00 p.m., ESPN+		Utah Tech						Dahlberg Arena; Missoula, MT
February 27, 2027; 7:00 p.m., ESPN+		Montana State; Rivalry						Dahlberg Arena; Missoula, MT
March 1, 2027; 6:30 p.m., ESPN+		at Southern Utah						America First Event Center; Cedar City, UT
Big Sky tournament
March 5, 2027; TBD, TBD		vs. TBD						Idaho Central Arena; Boise, ID
*Non-conference game. ^{#}Rankings from AP Poll. (#) Tournament seedings in parentheses. All times are in Mountain Time.
