= 2026–27 Idaho Vandals men's basketball team =

American college basketball season

2026–27 Idaho Vandals men's basketball
- Conference: Big Sky Conference
- Record: 2–3 (0–0 Big Sky)
- Head coach: Alex Pribble (4th season)
- Associate head coach: Brandon Laird (4th season)
- Assistant coaches: Matt Jones (4th season); Adam Ellis (4th season); Luke Chavez (3rd season)
- Home arena: ICCU Arena (Capacity: 4,200)

2026–27 Big Sky men's basketball standings
	Conf.				Overall
Team	W		L	PCT	W		L	PCT
Portland State	0	–	0	–	3	–	3	.500
Southern Utah	0	–	0	–	3	–	3	.500
Eastern Washington	0	–	0	–	2	–	3	.400
Idaho	0	–	0	–	2	–	3	.400
Montana	0	–	0	–	2	–	3	.400
Northern Colorado	0	–	0	–	2	–	3	.400
Montana State	0	–	0	–	2	–	4	.333
Northern Arizona	0	–	0	–	1	–	4	.200
Utah Tech	0	–	0	–	1	–	4	.200
Weber State	0	–	0	–	1	–	4	.200
Idaho State	0	–	0	–	0	–	4	.000
† 2027 Big Sky tournament winner As of November 20, 2026; Rankings from AP poll

The 2026–27 Idaho Vandals men's basketball team will represent the University of Idaho in the Big Sky Conference during the 2026–27 NCAA Division I men's basketball season. The Vandals were led by fourth-year head coach Alex Pribble and played their home games on campus at ICCU Arena in Moscow, Idaho.

== Previous season ==
The Vandals finished the 2025–26 season 21–15, 10–9 in Big Sky play to finish seventh in the conference. As the 7-seed in the Big Sky Tournament they defeated 8-seed Sacramento State in the First Round, 2-seed Montana State in the Quarterfinals, 3-seed Eastern Washington in the Semifinals and 4-seed Montana in the Championship to win the Big Sky tournament.

== Offseason ==
=== Departures ===
Name	Number	Pos.	Height	Weight	Year	Hometown	Reason for departure
Brody Rowbury	0	F	6'11"	255	Senior	Meridian, ID	Graduated
Trevon Blassingame	1	G	6'4"	180	(redshirt) Junior	Auburn, WA	Transferred to William & Mary
Talon Jenkins	2	G	6'7"		Freshman	Bellingham, WA	Transferred to Salt Lake Community College
Biko Johnson	3	G	6'2"	185	Senior	Carson, CA	Graduated
Aiden Sevilla	4	G	6'0"		GS	San Ramon, CA	Graduated
Isaiah Brickner	5	G	6'4"	190	Senior	San Diego, CA	Graduated
Jack Payne	7	G	6'6"	195	(redshirt) Junior	Boise, ID	Transferred to Long Beach State
Titus Yearout	11	G	6'2"	180	(redshirt) Junior	Lapwai, ID	Transferred to Lewis-Clark State
Jackson Rasmussen	12	F	6'7"	200	Freshman	Meridian, ID	Transferred to Oregon State
Kolton Mitchell	14	G	6'1"	170	(redshirt) Sophomore	Coeur d'Alene, ID	Transferred to Ohio
Ewan Steele	15	F	6'9"	220	Sophomore	Alton, Ontario, Canada	Transferred to Stonehill
Tyler Linhardt	22	F	6'7"	220	Senior	Seattle, WA	Graduated

=== Incoming transfers ===
Name	Number	Pos.	Height	Weight	Year	Hometown	Previous college
Ryan Lafferty	0	G	6'5"	-	Junior	Spokane, ID	St. Thomas
Diego Trejo-Delgado	1	F	6'7"	-	Senior	Camargo, Mexico	Saint Martin's
Brady Kennison	2	G	6'1"	-	Junior	Loveland, CO	North Platte Community College
Hudson Ward	8	F	6'7"	-	Junior	Leduc, Alberta, Canada	Western Michigan
Mo Diao	34	F	6'9"	-	Junior	Dakar, Senegal	McCook Community College
Kase Wynott	51	G	6'6"	-	Junior	Lapwai, ID	Washington State

=== 2026 recruiting class ===
College recruiting
Name	Hometown	School	Height	Weight	Commit date
Ryan Carney; SG	Spokane, WA	Gonzaga Prep	6 ft 3 in (1.91 m)	N/A	Apr 30, 2026
Ryan Carney; SG	Recruit ratings: No ratings found				
Jalen Williams; PG	San Diego, CA	San Marcos HS	6 ft 3 in (1.91 m)	N/A	Apr 16, 2026
Jalen Williams; PG	Recruit ratings: No ratings found				
Nolan Newman-Gomez; PF	Hesperia, CA	Hesperia HS	6 ft 6 in (1.98 m)	N/A	Apr 17, 2026
Nolan Newman-Gomez; PF	Recruit ratings: No ratings found				
TJ Wal; G	Edmonton, Alberta	Archbishop O'Leary HS	6 ft 7 in (2.01 m)	N/A	Apr 15, 2026
TJ Wal; G	Recruit ratings: No ratings found				
Overall recruit ranking: Scout: – Rivals: –
Note: In many cases, Scout, Rivals, 247Sports, On3, and ESPN may conflict in their listings of height and weight.; In these cases, the average was taken. ESPN grades are on a 100-point scale.; Sources: "2026 Idaho Basketball Recruiting Commits". Scout.; "Scout.com Team Recruiting Rankings". Scout.; "2026 Team Ranking". Rivals.

== Roster ==
2026–27 Idaho Vandals men's basketball team
Players
Coaches

Pos.	#	Name	Height	Weight	Year	Previous school	Hometown
G	0	Ryan Lafferty	6 ft 5 in (1.96 m)	—	Jr	St. Thomas (MN)	Spokane, Washington
F	1	Diego Trejo-Delgado	6 ft 7 in (2.01 m)	—	RS Sr	Saint Martin's	Camargo, Mexico
G	2	Brady Kennison	6 ft 1 in (1.85 m)	—	Jr	North Platte Community College	Loveland, Colorado
G	3	TJ Wal	6 ft 7 in (2.01 m)	—	Fr	Jellyfam Elite	Edmonton, Alberta
G	4	Jalen Williams	6 ft 3 in (1.91 m)	—	Fr	San Marcos HS	San Diego, California
F	5	Nolan Newman-Gomez	6 ft 6 in (1.98 m)	—	Fr	Hesperia HS	Hesperia, California
G	7	Zuby Toms	6 ft 3 in (1.91 m)	—	RS Fr	Mode Prep	Las Vegas, Nevada
G	8	Hudson Ward	6 ft 7 in (2.01 m)	—	Jr	Western Michigan	Leduc, Alberta
G	10	Kristian Gonzalez	6 ft 3 in (1.91 m)	—	RS Sr	Mater Dei Catholic HS	Chula Vista, California
G	12	Dylynn Groves	6 ft 4 in (1.93 m)	—	Fr	Gonzaga Preparatory School	Spokane, Washington
F	21	Seth Joba	6 ft 9 in (2.06 m)	—	Sr	Vermont	Orchard Park, New York
F	24	Miles Klapper	6 ft 3 in (1.91 m)	—	RS Sr	Bridgton Academy	Hillsborough, California
F	32	Will Jenson	6 ft 9 in (2.06 m)	—	So	Caldera HS	Bend, Oregon
F	33	Ryan Carney	6 ft 3 in (1.91 m)	—	Fr	Gonzaga Preparatory School	Spokane, Washington
F	34	Mo Diao	6 ft 9 in (2.06 m)	—	Jr	McCook Community College	Dakar, Senegal
G	51	Kase Wynott	6 ft 6 in (1.98 m)	—	Jr	Washington State	Lapwai, Idaho

Head coach

- Alex Pribble (California)

Assistant coach(es)

- Brandon Laird (UC Davis)
- Matt Jones (Trinity (TX))
- Adam Ellis (Eastern Washington)
- Luke Chavez (Saint Martin's)

Legend

- (C) Team captain
- (S) Suspended
- (I) Ineligible
- (W) Walk-on
- Injured
- Current redshirt

Roster
Last update: 2026-10-19

== Schedule and results ==
Date time, TV	Rank^{#}	Opponent^{#}	Result	Record	High points	High rebounds	High assists	Site (attendance) city, state
Exhibition
October 10, 2026*; 4:00 p.m., KTVB		vs. Boise State	L 72–82		24 – Gonzalez	6 – Diao	3 – Klapper	Idaho Central Arena (2,104); Boise, ID
Regular season
November 2, 2026*; 7:00 p.m., ESPN+		George Fox	W 97–56	1–0	20 – Wynott	12 – Ward	4 – Klapper	ICCU Arena (1,768); Moscow, ID
November 6, 2026*; 6:00 p.m., YouTube		at Colorado State	L 67–78	1–1	19 – Wynott	6 – Ward	5 – Klapper	Moby Arena (4,952); Fort Collins, CO
November 8, 2026*; 2:00 p.m., ESPN+		Lincoln (CA)	W 108–69	2–1	17 – Ward	8 – Wynott	7 – Tied	ICCU Arena (1,654); Moscow, ID
November 13, 2027*; 6:00 p.m., ESPN+		Cal Poly	L 74–83	2–2	24 – Klapper	9 – Gonzalez	6 – Klapper	ICCU Arena (2,228); Moscow, ID
November 18, 2026*; 7:00 p.m., MW+		at Nevada	L 74–91	2–3	15 – Klapper	7 – Ward	7 – Klapper	Lawlor Events Center (7,013); Reno, NV
November 20, 2026*; 6:00 p.m.		Cal State Bakersfield						ICCU Arena; Moscow, ID
November 23, 2026*; 6:00 p.m.		Dickinson State (N.D.)						ICCU Arena; Moscow, ID
November 27, 2026*; 5:00 p.m.		at Washington State; Battle of the Palouse						Beasley Coliseum; Pullman, WA
December 3, 2026; 5:00 p.m.		at Northern Colorado						Bank of Colorado Arena; Greeley, CO
December 5, 2026; 2:00 p.m.		at Portland State						Viking Pavilion; Portland, OR
December 8, 2026*; 6:00 p.m.		North Dakota State						ICCU Arena; Moscow, ID
December 12, 2026*; TBA		at South Dakota State						First Bank and Trust Arena; Brookings, SD
December 18, 2026*; 6:00 p.m.		Northwest Indian College						ICCU Arena; Moscow, ID
December 23, 2026*; 5:00 p.m.		at Arizona State						Desert Financial Arena; Tempe, AZ
December 31, 2026; 6:00 p.m.		Utah Tech						ICCU Arena; Moscow, ID
January 2, 2027; 2:00 p.m.		Southern Utah						ICCU Arena; Moscow, ID
January 9, 2027; 2:00 p.m.		Northern Arizona						ICCU Arena; Moscow, ID
January 14, 2027; 6:00 p.m.		at Montana						Dahlberg Arena; Missoula, MT
January 16, 2027; 1:00 p.m.		at Montana State						Brick Breeden Fieldhouse; Bozeman, MT
January 18, 2027; 5:00 p.m.		at Weber State						Dee Events Center; Ogden, UT
January 23, 2027; 2:00 p.m., ESPN+		Eastern Washington						ICCU Arena; Moscow, ID
January 25, 2027; 6:00 p.m.		Idaho State; Battle of the Domes						ICCU Arena; Moscow, ID
January 28, 2027; 6:00 p.m.		Portland State						ICCU Arena; Moscow, ID
January 30, 2027; 2:00 p.m.		Northern Colorado						ICCU Arena; Moscow, ID
February 4, 2027; 5:30 p.m.		at Southern Utah						America First Event Center; Cedar City, UT
February 6, 2027; 5:00 p.m.		at Utah Tech						Burns Arena; St. George, UT
February 11, 2027; 6:00 p.m.		Montana State						ICCU Arena; Moscow, ID
February 13, 2027; 2:00 p.m.		Montana						ICCU Arena; Moscow, ID
February 18, 2027; 5:00 p.m.		at Northern Arizona						Findlay Toyota Court; Flagstaff, AZ
February 22, 2027; 6:00 p.m.		Weber State						ICCU Arena; Moscow, ID
February 27, 2027; 2:00 p.m.		at Eastern Washington						Reese Court; Cheney, WA
March 1, 2027; 6:00 p.m.		at Idaho State; Battle of the Domes						Reed Gym; Pocatello, ID
Big Sky tournament
March 5-10, 2027		vs.						Idaho Central Arena; Boise, ID
*Non-conference game. ^{#}Rankings from AP Poll. (#) Tournament seedings in parentheses. S=South. All times are in Pacific Time.
