= 2026–27 Northern Colorado Bears men's basketball team =

American college basketball season

2026–27 Northern Colorado Bears men's basketball
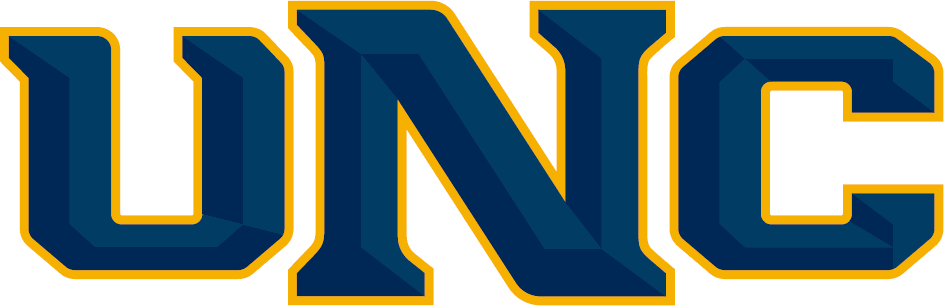
- Conference: Big Sky Conference
- Record: 2–3 (0–0 Big Sky)
- Head coach: Steve Smiley (7th season)
- Associate head coach: Dorian Green (5th season, 8th overall)
- Assistant coaches: Houston Reed (7th season); Brett Cloepfil (4th season); Colin Gause (4th season); Demitrius Martin (1st season)
- Home arena: Bank of Colorado Arena (Capacity: 2,992)

2026–27 Big Sky men's basketball standings
| | Conf. | | | | Overall |
| Team | W | | L | PCT | W | | L | PCT |
|---|---|---|---|---|---|---|---|---|
| Southern Utah | 0 | – | 0 | – | 3 | – | 2 | .600 |
| Idaho | 0 | – | 0 | – | 2 | – | 2 | .500 |
| Northern Colorado | 0 | – | 0 | – | 2 | – | 2 | .500 |
| Eastern Washington | 0 | – | 0 | – | 2 | – | 3 | .400 |
| Montana | 0 | – | 0 | – | 2 | – | 3 | .400 |
| Montana State | 0 | – | 0 | – | 2 | – | 3 | .400 |
| Portland State | 0 | – | 0 | – | 2 | – | 3 | .400 |
| Utah Tech | 0 | – | 0 | – | 1 | – | 3 | .250 |
| Weber State | 0 | – | 0 | – | 1 | – | 3 | .250 |
| Northern Arizona | 0 | – | 0 | – | 1 | – | 4 | .200 |
| Idaho State | 0 | – | 0 | – | 0 | – | 4 | .000 |
† 2027 Big Sky tournament winner As of November 19, 2026; Rankings from AP poll

The 2026–27 Northern Colorado Bears men's basketball team will represent the University of Northern Colorado during the 2026–27 NCAA Division I men's basketball season. The Bears will be led by seventh-year head coach Steve Smiley and will play their home games at Bank of Colorado Arena in Greeley, Colorado as a member of the Big Sky Conference.

== Previous season ==
Northern Colorado finished the 2025-26 season 20–12, 10–8 in the Big Sky Conference to finish tied for fourth in the conference. As the 5-seed in the Big Sky Tournament the Bears were defeated by 4-seed Montana in the First round 89–95 to end their season.

=== Departures ===
Northern Colorado Bears departures
| Name | Number | Pos. | Height | Weight | Year | Hometown | Reason for departure |
|---|---|---|---|---|---|---|---|
| Walker Asp | 0 | F | 6'7" | 180 | Sophomore | Colorado Springs, CO | Transferred to Colorado Mesa |
| Kaden Ericksen | 2 | G | 6'4" | 185 | Junior | Syracuse, UT | Transferred to Cal State Dominguez Hills |
| Ring Nyeri | 7 | F | 6'8" | 185 | Sophomore | Peoria, AZ | Transferred to Wake Forest |
| Zach Bloch | 8 | G | 6'2" | 185 | Graduate | Lawrence, KS | Out of eligibility |
| Chancellor White | 11 | G | 6'6" | 195 | Junior | Richmond, TX | Transferred to Arkansas-Fort Smith |
| Will Dixion III | 13 | G | 6'2" | 200 | (redshirt) Freshman | Tucson, AZ | Transferred to Carolina |
| Brock Wisne | 14 | F | 6'9" | 245 | Senior | Thornton, CO | Out of eligibility |
| William Humer | 21 | F | 6'10" | 225 | Senior | Sollentuna, Sweden | Transferred to Barry |
| Quinn Denker | 35 | G | 6'3" | 190 | Graduate | San Jose, CA | Out of eligibility |
| Ibu Yamazaki | 54 | F | 6'7" | 215 | Junior | Matsudo, Japan | Departed program |

=== Incoming transfers ===
Northern Colorado Bears incoming transfers
| Name | Number | Pos. | Height | Weight | Year | Hometown | Previous School |
|---|---|---|---|---|---|---|---|
| Kaidon Rayfield | 1 | F | 6'8" | 205 | Sophomore | Oklahoma City, OK | UTSA |
| Chiante Tramble | 2 | G | 6'2" | 200 | Junior | Edmond, OK | Southern Miss |
| Campbell Blogg | 9 | G | 6'4" | 195 | Junior | Melbourne, Australia | Melbourne United |
| Manning Shareef | 23 | F | 6'8" | 225 | Sophomore | Milwaukee, WI | Trinidad State College |
| Andrew Crawford | 42 | F | 6'8" | 190 | Junior | Littleton, CO | Colorado |

=== 2026 recruiting class ===
College recruiting
| Name | Hometown | School | Height | Weight | Commit date |
|---|---|---|---|---|---|
| Will Gordon; CG | Chandler, AZ | AZ Compass Prep | 6 ft 4 in (1.93 m) | 185 lb (84 kg) | May 19, 2026 |
| Will Gordon; CG | Recruit ratings: (NR) | | | | |
| Jeremiah Hammond; CG | Westchester, FL | Christopher Columbus HS | 6 ft 3 in (1.91 m) | 180 lb (82 kg) | Aug 12, 2025 |
| Jeremiah Hammond; CG | Recruit ratings: 247Sports: (NR) | | | | |
| Drew Paine; PF/C | ThunderRidge HS | Highlands Ranch, CO | 6 ft 8 in (2.03 m) | 220 lb (100 kg) | Aug 31, 2025 |
| Drew Paine; PF/C | Recruit ratings: (NR) | | | | |
Overall recruit ranking: Scout: – Rivals: –
Note: In many cases, Scout, Rivals, 247Sports, On3, and ESPN may conflict in their listings of height and weight.; In these cases, the average was taken. ESPN grades are on a 100-point scale.; Sources: "2026 Northern Colorado Basketball Recruiting Commits". Scout.; "Scout.com Team Recruiting Rankings". Scout.; "2026 Team Ranking". Rivals.

== Roster ==
2026–27 Northern Colorado Bears men's basketball team
Players
Coaches

| Pos. | # | Name | Height | Weight | Year | Previous school | Hometown |
|---|---|---|---|---|---|---|---|
| F | 1 | Kaidon Rayfield | 6 ft 8 in (2.03 m) | 205 lb (93 kg) | So | UTSA | Oklahoma City, Oklahoma |
| G | 2 | Chiante Tramble | 6 ft 2 in (1.88 m) | 200 lb (91 kg) | Jr | Southern Miss | Edmond, Oklahoma |
| G | 3 | Ariik Mawien | 6 ft 4 in (1.93 m) | 185 lb (84 kg) | Jr | Link Year Prep Academy | Anoka, Minnesota |
| C | 4 | Hunter Caldwell | 6 ft 10 in (2.08 m) | 230 lb (104 kg) | Jr | Lutheran HS | Parker, Colorado |
| G | 5 | Steven Ramirez Jr. | 6 ft 4 in (1.93 m) | 205 lb (93 kg) | So | Keller HS | Fort Worth, Texas |
| G | 6 | Langston Reynolds | 6 ft 4 in (1.93 m) | 215 lb (98 kg) | GS | Colorado Prep | Denver, Colorado |
| G | 9 | Campbell Blogg | 6 ft 4 in (1.93 m) | 195 lb (88 kg) | Jr | Melbourne United | Melbourne, Australia |
| G | 10 | Tanner Braketa | 6 ft 1 in (1.85 m) | 180 lb (82 kg) | So | Ralston Valley HS | Arvada, Colorado |
| G | 11 | Vincent Delano | 6 ft 2 in (1.88 m) | 180 lb (82 kg) | Sr | Portland | Phoenix, Arizona |
| G | 13 | Will Gordon | 6 ft 4 in (1.93 m) | 185 lb (84 kg) | Fr | AZ Compass Prep | Clearwater, Florida |
| F/C | 15 | Drew Paine | 6 ft 8 in (2.03 m) | 220 lb (100 kg) | Fr | ThunderRidge HS | Highlands Ranch, Colorado |
| G | 22 | Jeremiah Hammond | 6 ft 3 in (1.91 m) | 180 lb (82 kg) | Fr | Christopher Columbus HS | Denver, Colorado |
| F | 23 | Manning Shareef | 6 ft 8 in (2.03 m) | 225 lb (102 kg) | So | Trinidad State College | Milwaukee, Wisconsin |
| C | 33 | Egan Shields | 6 ft 10 in (2.08 m) | 250 lb (113 kg) | Sr | Colorado Prep | Ashland, Oregon |
| F | 42 | Andrew Crawford | 6 ft 8 in (2.03 m) | 190 lb (86 kg) | Jr | Colorado | Littleton, Colorado |

Head coach

- Steve Smiley (Northern State)

Assistant coach(es)

- Dorian Green (Colorado State)
- Houston Reed (Northern State)
- Brett Cloepfil (CSU Pueblo)
- Colin Gause (Northern Colorado)
- Demitrius Martin (Waldorf)

Legend

- (C) Team captain
- (S) Suspended
- (I) Ineligible
- (W) Walk-on
- Injured
- Current redshirt

Roster

== Schedule and results ==
| Date time, TV | Rank^{#} | Opponent^{#} | Result | Record | High points | High rebounds | High assists | Site (attendance) city, state |
Regular season
| November 2, 2026*; 7:30 p.m., TBD | | Colorado College | W 117–64 | 1–0 | 17 – Hammond | 7 – Crawford | 6 – Reynolds | Bank of Colorado Arena (1,009); Greeley, CO |
| November 6, 2026*; 6:00 p.m., ESPN+ | | at Arizona State | L 63–90 | 1–1 | 13 – Shareef | 11 – Crawford | 4 – Reynolds | Desert Financial Arena (5,295); Tempe, AZ |
| November 10, 2026*; 6:00 p.m., ESPN+ | | Northern New Mexico | W 102–52 | 2–1 | 14 – Crawford | 13 – Crawford | 7 – Tied (2) | Bank of Colorado Arena (1,590); Greeley, CO |
| November 14, 2026*; 2:00 p.m., SLN | | vs. South Dakota State | L 46–71 | 2–2 | 16 – Crawford | 6 – Mawien | 2 – Tramble | The Monument (2,545); Rapid City, SD |
| November 18, 2026*; 7:00 p.m., ESPN+ | | at No. 21 BYU | L 54–98 | 2–3 | 11 – Shareef | 6 – Crawford | 3 – Tied | Marriott Center (17,245); Provo, UT |
| November 21, 2026*; 2:00 p.m., ESPN+ | | Justice | | | | | | Bank of Colorado Arena; Greeley, CO |
| November 24, 2026*; 10:30 a.m., FloSports | | vs. Southeastern Louisiana; Cancún Challenge | | | | | | Hard Rock Hotel Riviera Maya; Cancún, QR, Mexico |
| November 25, 2026*; TBA, FloSports | | vs. North Dakota/Detroit Mercy; Cancún Challenge | | | | | | Hard Rock Hotel Riviera Maya; Cancún, QR, Mexico |
| November 28, 2026*; 2:00 p.m., ESPN+ | | at San Diego | | | | | | Jenny Craig Pavilion; San Diego, CA |
| December 3, 2026; 6:00 p.m., ESPN+ | | Idaho | | | | | | Bank of Colorado Arena; Greeley, CO |
| December 5, 2026; 2:00 p.m., ESPN+ | | Eastern Washington | | | | | | Bank of Colorado Arena; Greeley, CO |
| December 14, 2026*; 8:00 p.m., ACCNX | | at Stanford | | | | | | Maples Pavilion; Stanford, CA |
| December 20, 2026*; 4:00 p.m., ESPN+ | | at Charleston; Cancún Challenge campus-site game | | | | | | TD Arena; Charleston, SC |
| December 20, 2026*; 2:00 p.m., ESPN+ | | Regis | | | | | | Bank of Colorado Arena; Greeley, CO |
| December 31, 2026; 4:00 p.m., ESPN+ | | at Montana | | | | | | Dahlberg Arena; Missoula, MT |
| January 2, 2027; 6:00 p.m., ESPN+ | | at Montana State | | | | | | Worthington Arena; Bozeman, MT |
| January 7, 2027; 6:30 p.m., ESPN+ | | at Southern Utah | | | | | | America First Event Center; Cedar City, UT |
| January 9, 2027; 7:00 p.m., ESPN+ | | at Utah Tech | | | | | | Burns Arena; St. George, UT |
| January 14, 2027; 6:00 p.m., ESPN+ | | Idaho State | | | | | | Bank of Colorado Arena; Greeley, CO |
| January 16, 2027; 6:00 p.m., ESPN+ | | Weber State | | | | | | Bank of Colorado Arena; Greeley, CO |
| January 23, 2027; 6:00 p.m., ESPN+ | | at Northern Arizona | | | | | | Rolle Activity Center; Flagstaff, AZ |
| January 25, 2026; 6:00 p.m., ESPN+ | | Portland State | | | | | | Bank of Colorado Arena; Greeley, CO |
| January 28, 2027; 7:00 p.m., ESPN+ | | at Eastern Washington | | | | | | Reese Court; Cheney, WA |
| January 30, 2027; 2:00 p.m., ESPN+ | | at Idaho | | | | | | ICCU Arena; Moscow, ID |
| February 4, 2027; 6:00 p.m., ESPN+ | | Montana State | | | | | | Bank of Colorado Arena; Greeley, CO |
| February 6, 2027; 6:00 p.m., ESPN+ | | Montana | | | | | | Bank of Colorado Arena; Greeley, CO |
| February 11, 2027; 4:00 p.m., ESPN+ | | at Weber State | | | | | | Dee Events Center; Ogden, UT |
| February 13, 2027; 7:00 p.m., ESPN+ | | at Idaho State | | | | | | Reed Gym; Pocatello, ID |
| February 18, 2027; 6:00 p.m., ESPN+ | | Utah Tech | | | | | | Bank of Colorado Arena; Greeley, CO |
| February 20, 2027; 2:00 p.m., ESPN+ | | Southern Utah | | | | | | Bank of Colorado Arena; Greeley, CO |
| February 27, 2027; 3:00 p.m., ESPN+ | | at Portland State | | | | | | Viking Pavilion; Portland, OR |
| March 1, 2027; 6:00 p.m., ESPN+ | | Northern Arizona | | | | | | Bank of Colorado Arena; Greeley, CO |
Big Sky tournament
| March 5, 2027; TBD, TBD | | vs. TBD | | | | | | Idaho Central Arena; Boise, ID |
*Non-conference game. ^{#}Rankings from AP Poll. (#) Tournament seedings in parentheses. All times are in Mountain Time.
