= 2026–27 Southern Utah Thunderbirds men's basketball team =

American college basketball season

2026–27 Southern Utah Thunderbirds men's basketball
- Conference: Big Sky Conference
- Record: 3–3 (0–0 Big Sky)
- Head coach: Rob Jeter (4th season)
- Assistant coaches: Will Ryan (2nd season); Donald Williams (4th season); Shaun Gutting (4th season); Braden Lamar (1st season)
- Home arena: America First Event Center (Capacity: 5,300)

2026–27 Big Sky men's basketball standings
	Conf.				Overall
Team	W		L	PCT	W		L	PCT
Portland State	0	–	0	–	3	–	3	.500
Southern Utah	0	–	0	–	3	–	3	.500
Eastern Washington	0	–	0	–	2	–	3	.400
Idaho	0	–	0	–	2	–	3	.400
Montana	0	–	0	–	2	–	3	.400
Northern Colorado	0	–	0	–	2	–	3	.400
Montana State	0	–	0	–	2	–	4	.333
Northern Arizona	0	–	0	–	1	–	4	.200
Utah Tech	0	–	0	–	1	–	4	.200
Weber State	0	–	0	–	1	–	4	.200
Idaho State	0	–	0	–	0	–	4	.000
† 2027 Big Sky tournament winner As of November 20, 2026; Rankings from AP poll

The 2026–27 Southern Utah Thunderbirds men's basketball team will represent Southern Utah University during the 2026–27 NCAA Division I men's basketball season. The Thunderbirds will be led by fourth-year head coach Rob Jeter and will play their home games at America First Event Center in Cedar City, Utah as a member of the Big Sky Conference. This will mark Southern Utah's first season returning as members of the Big Sky Conference (11th overall) after spending the previous four seasons as members of the Western Athletic Conference.

== Previous season ==
Southern Utah finished the 2025-26 season 10–22, 6–12 in the Western Athletic Conference to finish fifth in the conference. As the 5-seed in the WAC Tournament the Thunderbirds were defeated by 5-seed UT Arlington in the Quarterfinals 63–69 to end their season.

== Offseason ==
=== Departures ===
Southern Utah Thunderbirds departures
Name	Number	Pos.	Height	Weight	Year	Hometown	Reason for departure
Isaiah Cottrell	0	F	6'11"	245	Senior	Las Vegas, NV	Out of eligibility
Elijah Duval	1	G	6'3"	195	Freshman	Wilmington, DE	Transferred to UAB
Logan Stephens	2	G	6'3"	200	Senior	Decatur, GA	Out of eligibility
Tanner Hayhurst	3	G	6'6"	204	Junior	Eagle, ID	Transferred to Western Michigan
Lorenzo Abellar	4	G	5'10"	-	Senior	Las Vegas, NV	Out of eligibility
Zach Bell	5	G	6'2"	180	Junior	Barnwell, SC	Out of eligibility
Jalen (Roc) Lee	9	G	6'7"	-	Sophomore	Atlanta, GA	Transferred to Clark Atlanta
Langston Binns	10	G	6'2"	-	Senior	Saint Paul, MN	Out of eligibility
Dylan Jones	20	G	6'6"	190	Senior	Saratoga Springs, UT	Out of eligibility
Chuks Isitua	23	F	6'10"	-	(redshirt) Sophomore	Lagos, Nigeria	Entered transfer portal
Kai Burdick	25	C	7'0"	-	Senior	Carlsbad, CA	Out of eligibility

=== Incoming transfers ===
Southern Utah Thunderbirds incoming transfers
Name	Number	Pos.	Height	Weight	Year	Hometown	Previous School
Jalik Nicholls	1	F	6'6"	-	Sophomore	Scranton, PA	Pensacola State College
Dylan Sanders	5	G	6'4''	-	Junior	Aurora, CO	CSU Pueblo
Jajuan Nicholls	7	F	6'9"	220	Junior	Scranton, PA	Tennessee Tech
Jordan Brown	10	G	6'1"	200	Sophomore	Atlanta, GA	UNC Greensboro
Anthony Breland	22	G	6'2"	190	Sophomore	Newton, NC	Miami Dade College
Chase Degraffenried	33	G	6'4''	-	Sophomore	Salem, UT	Green River College

=== 2026 recruiting class ===
College recruiting
Name	Hometown	School	Height	Weight	Commit date
Rashaad Davis; PG	Milwaukee, WI	Nicolet High School	5 ft 11 in (1.80 m)	145 lb (66 kg)	Nov 14, 2025
Rashaad Davis; PG	Recruit ratings: (NR)				
DeZhon Hall; SG	Fishers, IN	Crispus Attucks High School	6 ft 3 in (1.91 m)	160 lb (73 kg)	Jun 2, 2026
DeZhon Hall; SG	Recruit ratings: 247Sports: On3: (NR)				
Mikhail Protsenko; C	Belgorod, Russia	SC Derby	7 ft 1 in (2.16 m)	N/A	Aug 27, 2026
Mikhail Protsenko; C	Recruit ratings: (NR)				
DJ Smith; PF	Dallas, TX	Albuquerque Prep	6 ft 10 in (2.08 m)	N/A	Apr 24, 2026
DJ Smith; PF	Recruit ratings: (NR)				
Overall recruit ranking: Scout: – Rivals: –
Note: In many cases, Scout, Rivals, 247Sports, On3, and ESPN may conflict in their listings of height and weight.; In these cases, the average was taken. ESPN grades are on a 100-point scale.; Sources: "2026 Southern Utah Basketball Recruiting Commits". Scout.; "Scout.com Team Recruiting Rankings". Scout.; "2026 Team Ranking". Rivals.

== Roster ==
2026–27 Southern Utah Thunderbirds men's basketball team
Players
Coaches

Pos.	#	Name	Height	Weight	Year	Previous school	Hometown
G	0	Brayden Johnson	6 ft 1 in (1.85 m)	—	Jr	Kishwaukee College	Tulsa, Oklahoma
F	1	Jalik Nicholls	6 ft 6 in (1.98 m)	—	So	Pensacola State College	Scranton, Pennsylvania
G	2	DeZhon Hall	6 ft 3 in (1.91 m)	—	Fr	Crispus Attucks HS	Fishers, Indiana
G	3	Rashaad Davis	5 ft 10 in (1.78 m)	—	Fr	Nicolet HS	Milwaukee, Wisconsin
G	4	Zeplin Kidd	6 ft 7 in (2.01 m)	—	So	King's Ridge Christian School	Atlanta, Georgia
G	5	Dylan Sanders	6 ft 4 in (1.93 m)	—	Jr	CSU Pueblo	Aurora, Colorado
F	6	DJ Smith	6 ft 10 in (2.08 m)	—	Fr	Albuquerque Prep	Dallas, Texas
F	7	Jajuan Nicholls	6 ft 9 in (2.06 m)	220 lb (100 kg)	Jr	Tennessee Tech	Scranton, Pennsylvania
G	10	Jordan Brown	6 ft 1 in (1.85 m)	200 lb (91 kg)	So	UNC Greensboro	Atlanta, Georgia
F	11	Juok Riak	6 ft 8 in (2.03 m)	215 lb (98 kg)	Jr	Drury	Madison, Wisconsin
G	22	Anthony Breland	6 ft 2 in (1.88 m)	190 lb (86 kg)	So	Miami Dade College	Newton, North Carolina
F	24	Cale Barclay	6 ft 8 in (2.03 m)	—	So	Herriman HS	Herriman, Utah
C	32	Mikhail Protsenko	7 ft 1 in (2.16 m)	—	Fr	SC Derby	Belgorod, Russia
G	33	Chase Degraffenried	6 ft 4 in (1.93 m)	—	So	Green River College	Salem, Utah
F	35	Jaiden Feroah	6 ft 9 in (2.06 m)	214 lb (97 kg)	GS	Holy Cross	Draper, Utah

Head coach

- Rob Jeter (UW–Platteville)

Assistant coach(es)

- Will Ryan (Milwaukee)
- Donald Williams (Cal State Hayward)
- Shaun Gutting (Colorado State)
- Braden Lamar (Western Illinois)

Legend

- (C) Team captain
- (S) Suspended
- (I) Ineligible
- (W) Walk-on
- Injured
- Current redshirt

Roster

== Schedule and results ==
Date time, TV	Rank^{#}	Opponent^{#}	Result	Record	High points	High rebounds	High assists	Site (attendance) city, state
Exhibition
October 12, 2026*; 12:00 p.m.		Ottawa Arizona	W 78–51	-	20 – Jaj. Nicholls	11 – Feroah	4 – Degraffenried	America First Event Center (823); Cedar City, UT
Regular season
November 2, 2026*; 7:00 p.m., ESPN+		West Coast Baptist	W 134–69	1–0	14 – Tied	8 – Smith	6 – Davis	America First Event Center (547); Cedar City, UT
November 5, 2026*; 8:00 p.m., ESPN+		Grace	W 97–53	2–0	17 – Jaj. Nicholls	6 – Tied	3 – Tied	America First Event Center (643); Cedar City, UT
November 7, 2026*; 6:30 p.m., ESPN+		Bethesda	W 143–49	3–0	20 – Breland	10 – Smith	7 – Barclay	America First Event Center (337); Cedar City, UT
November 12, 2026*; 5:00 p.m., ESPN+		at High Point	L 59–88	3–1	10 – Tied	10 – Feroah	6 – Davis	Qubein Center (3,494); High Point, NC
November 14, 2026*; 2:00 p.m., ACCNX		at Wake Forest	L 51–89	3–2	12 – Jaj. Nicholls	10 – Jaj. Nicholls	4 – Davis	LJVM Coliseum (6,202); Winston-Salem, NC
November 19, 2026*; 6:00 p.m., SEC+		at No. 6 Texas	L 68–92	3–3	15 – Feroah	9 – Feroah	5 – Davis	Moody Center (10,399); Austin, TX
November 23, 2026*; 1:30 p.m., TBD		vs. Arkansas State; FIU MTE						Ocean Bank Convocation Center; Miami, FL
November 24, 2026*; 11:00 a.m., TBD		at FIU; FIU MTE						Ocean Bank Convocation Center; Miami, FL
November 25, 2026*; 11:00 a.m., TBD		vs. Long Beach State; FIU MTE						Ocean Bank Convocation Center; Miami, FL
December 3, 2026; 6:30 p.m., ESPN+		Idaho State						America First Event Center; Cedar City, UT
December 5, 2026; 6:30 p.m., ESPN+		Weber State						America First Event Center; Cedar City, UT
December 8, 2026*; TBD, B10+		at Washington						Alaska Airlines Arena; Seattle, WA
December 12, 2026*; 3:00 p.m., MW+		at San Jose State						Provident Credit Union Event Center; San Jose, CA
December 22, 2026*; 7:00 p.m., ESPN+		at Utah						Jon M. Huntsman Center; Salt Lake City, UT
December 31, 2026; 7:00 p.m., ESPN+		at Eastern Washington						Reese Court; Cheney, WA
January 2, 2027; 3:00 p.m., ESPN+		at Idaho						ICCU Arena; Moscow, ID
January 7, 2027; 6:30 p.m., ESPN+		Northern Colorado						America First Event Center; Cedar City, UT
January 9, 2027; 6:30 p.m., ESPN+		Portland State						America First Event Center; Cedar City, UT
January 16, 2027; 7:00 p.m., ESPN+		at Utah Tech						Burns Arena; St. George, UT
January 18, 2027; 6:30 p.m., ESPN+		Montana State						America First Event Center; Cedar City, UT
January 25, 2027; 7:00 p.m., ESPN+		at Montana						Dahlberg Arena; Missoula, MT
January 28, 2027; 6:00 p.m., ESPN+		at Weber State						Dee Events Center; Ogden, UT
January 30, 2027; 4:00 p.m., ESPN+		at Idaho State						Reed Gym; Pocatello, ID
February 4, 2027; 6:30 p.m., ESPN+		Idaho						America First Event Center; Cedar City, UT
February 6, 2027; 6:30 p.m., ESPN+		Eastern Washington						America First Event Center; Cedar City, UT
February 8, 2027; 6:00 p.m., ESPN+		at Northern Arizona						Rolle Activity Center; Flagstaff, AZ
February 13, 2027; 6:30 p.m., ESPN+		Utah Tech						America First Event Center; Cedar City, UT
February 18, 2027; 8:00 p.m., ESPN+		at Portland State						Viking Pavilion; Portland, OR
February 20, 2027; 2:00 p.m., ESPN+		at Northern Colorado						Bank of Colorado Arena; Greeley, CO
February 22, 2027; 7:00 p.m., ESPN+		at Montana State						Worthington Arena; Bozeman, MT
February 27, 2027; 6:30 p.m., ESPN+		Northern Arizona						America First Event Center; Cedar City, UT
March 1, 2027; 6:30 p.m., ESPN+		Montana						America First Event Center; Cedar City, UT
Big Sky tournament
March 5, 2027; TBD, TBD		vs. TBD						Idaho Central Arena; Boise, ID
*Non-conference game. ^{#}Rankings from AP Poll. (#) Tournament seedings in parentheses. All times are in Mountain Time.
