= 2026–27 Utah Tech Trailblazers men's basketball team =

American college basketball season

2026–27 Utah Tech Trailblazers men's basketball
- Conference: Big Sky Conference
- Record: 1–2 (0–0 Big Sky)
- Head coach: Jon Judkins (22nd season)
- Associate head coach: Jake Schroeder (8th season)
- Assistant coaches: Anthony Morris (6th season); Brock Staheli (6th season); Brock Gilbert (1st season)
- Home arena: Burns Arena (Capacity: 5,000)

2026–27 Big Sky men's basketball standings
	Conf.				Overall
Team	W		L	PCT	W		L	PCT
Southern Utah	0	–	0	–	3	–	0	1.000
Idaho	0	–	0	–	2	–	1	.667
Montana	0	–	0	–	1	–	1	.500
Montana State	0	–	0	–	1	–	1	.500
Northern Colorado	0	–	0	–	1	–	1	.500
Portland State	0	–	0	–	1	–	1	.500
Utah Tech	0	–	0	–	1	–	1	.500
Northern Arizona	0	–	0	–	0	–	2	.000
Weber State	0	–	0	–	0	–	2	.000
Eastern Washington	0	–	0	–	0	–	3	.000
Idaho State	0	–	0	–	0	–	3	.000
† 2027 Big Sky tournament winner As of November 11, 2026; Rankings from AP poll

The 2026–27 Utah Tech Trailblazers men's basketball team will represent Utah Tech University during the 2026–27 NCAA Division I men's basketball season. The Trailblazers will be led by twenty-second-year head coach Jon Judkins and will play their home games at Burns Arena in St. George, Utah as a member of the Big Sky Conference. This will mark Utah Tech's first season as members of the Big Sky Conference after spending the previous six seasons as members of the Western Athletic Conference.

== Previous season ==
Utah Tech finished the 2025-26 season 19–15, 11–7 in the Western Athletic Conference to finish third in the conference. As the 3-seed in the WAC Tournament the Trailblazers defeated 6-seed Abilene Christian in the Quarterfinals before falling to 2-seed California Baptist in the Semifinals 72–86 to end their season.

== Offseason ==
=== Departures ===
Utah Tech Trailblazers departures
Name	Number	Pos.	Height	Weight	Year	Hometown	Reason for departure
Hunter Schenck	1	G	6'2"	165	Sophomore	Pleasant View, UT	Transferred to Salt Lake CC
Chance Trujillo	2	G	6'4"	200	(redshirt) Sophomore	Kaysville, UT	Transferred to Hawaii
Jusaun Holt	4	G	6'7"	185	(redshirt) Senior	Tacoma, WA	Out of eligibility
Marvel Allen	8	G	6'4"	205	(redshirt) Sophomore	Fort Lauderdale, FL	Transferred to Barry
Tanner Davis	11	G	6'5"	160	Freshman	Smithfield, UT	Transferred to Utah Valley
Britton Berrett	13	G	6'5"	185	Senior	Rigby, ID	Out of eligibility
Madiba Owona	33	F	6'4"	175	Sophomore	Bordeaux, France	Departed program
Dario Domingos	52	F	6'7"	260	Senior	Luanda, Angola	Out of eligibility
Noah Bolanga	66	G	6'8"	180	Sophomore	Poitiers, France	Transferred to Abilene Christian

=== Incoming transfers ===
Utah Tech Trailblazers incoming transfers
Name	Number	Pos.	Height	Weight	Year	Hometown	Previous School
Petros Ragkos	0	G	6'5"	190	Senior	Patras, Greece	Panellinios B.C.
Mark Brown Jr.	1	G	6'0"	190	Senior	Phoenix, AZ	Valparaiso
Rex Sunderland	2	G	6'5"	200	Graduate	Kaysville, UT	New Hampshire
Aris Rodriguez	4	G	6'5"	170	Junior	Reading, PA	Barton CC
Alex Dupre	10	G	6'5"	190	Junior	Los Angeles, CA	Portland State
Kyle Lemke	12	C	6'8''	240	Junior	St. George, UT	Snow College
Aaron Bliss	17	F	6'11''	220	Junior	El Dorado Hills, CA	Snow College
Boston Harker	33	G	6'4"	205	Graduate	Raymond, AB, Canada	Garden City CC

=== 2026 recruiting class ===
College recruiting
Name	Hometown	School	Height	Weight	Commit date
Jax Clark; PF	American Fork, UT	American Fork HS	6 ft 7 in (2.01 m)	210 lb (95 kg)	Jun 11, 2026
Jax Clark; PF	Recruit ratings: 247Sports: (NR)				
Christian Gibson; SG	Houston, TX	Tennessee Christian Academy	6 ft 4 in (1.93 m)	190 lb (86 kg)	Jun 5, 2026
Christian Gibson; SG	Recruit ratings: 247Sports: On3: ESPN: (82)				
Owen Mackay; CG	St. George, UT	Snow Canyon HS	6 ft 5 in (1.96 m)	190 lb (86 kg)	Nov 8, 2024
Owen Mackay; CG	Recruit ratings: (NR)				
Overall recruit ranking: Scout: – Rivals: –
Note: In many cases, Scout, Rivals, 247Sports, On3, and ESPN may conflict in their listings of height and weight.; In these cases, the average was taken. ESPN grades are on a 100-point scale.; Sources: "2026 Utah Tech Basketball Recruiting Commits". Scout.; "Scout.com Team Recruiting Rankings". Scout.; "2026 Team Ranking". Rivals.

== Roster ==
2026–27 Utah Tech Trailblazers men's basketball team
Players
Coaches

Pos.	#	Name	Height	Weight	Year	Previous school	Hometown
G	0	Petros Ragkos	6 ft 5 in (1.96 m)	190 lb (86 kg)	Sr	Panellinios B.C.	Patras, Greece
G	1	Mark Brown Jr.	6 ft 0 in (1.83 m)	190 lb (86 kg)	Sr	Valparaiso	Phoenix, Arizona
G	2	Christian Gibson	6 ft 5 in (1.96 m)	190 lb (86 kg)	Fr	Tennessee Christian Academy	Houston, Texas
G	3	Rex Sunderland	6 ft 5 in (1.96 m)	200 lb (91 kg)	GS	Stonehill	Kaysville, Utah
G	4	Aris Rodriguez	6 ft 5 in (1.96 m)	170 lb (77 kg)	Jr	Barton CC	Reading, Pennsylvania
F	5	Dallin Grant	6 ft 8 in (2.03 m)	220 lb (100 kg)	Sr	Utah State	Cedar City, Utah
F	7	Jax Clark	6 ft 8 in (2.03 m)	215 lb (98 kg)	Fr	American Fork HS	American Fork, Utah
G	10	Alex Dupre	6 ft 5 in (1.96 m)	190 lb (86 kg)	Jr	Portland State	Los Angeles, California
C	12	Kyle Lemke	6 ft 8 in (2.03 m)	240 lb (109 kg)	Jr	Snow College	St. George, Utah
G/F	14	Preston Vandermyde	6 ft 6 in (1.98 m)	215 lb (98 kg)	Jr	Desert Hills HS	St. George, Utah
F	17	Aaron Bliss	6 ft 11 in (2.11 m)	220 lb (100 kg)	Jr	Snow College	El Dorado Hills, California
F	23	Samuel "Tobi" Ariyibi	6 ft 8 in (2.03 m)	195 lb (88 kg)	GS	Washington	Lagos, Nigeria
G	24	Owen Mackay	6 ft 5 in (1.96 m)	190 lb (86 kg)	Fr	Snow College	St. George, Utah
G	33	Boston Harker	6 ft 4 in (1.93 m)	205 lb (93 kg)	GS	Garden City CC	Raymond, Alberta, Canada
F	35	Ethan Potter	6 ft 8 in (2.03 m)	230 lb (104 kg)	GS	Utah Valley	Layton, Utah

Head coach

- Jon Judkins (Utah State)

Assistant coach(es)

- Jake Schroeder (Portland State)
- Anthony Morris (Washington)
- Brock Staheli (Dixie State)
- Brock Gilbert (Dixie State)

Legend

- (C) Team captain
- (S) Suspended
- (I) Ineligible
- (W) Walk-on
- Injured
- Current redshirt

Roster

== Schedule and results ==
Date time, TV	Rank^{#}	Opponent^{#}	Result	Record	High points	High rebounds	High assists	Site (attendance) city, state
Exhibition
October 17, 2026*; 7:00 p.m.		Utah Valley	W 92–80	-	23 – Gibson	10 – Potter	5 – Brown Jr.	Burns Arena (472); St. George, UT
October 24, 2026*; 7:00 p.m.		West Coast Baptist	W 134-66		–	–	–	Burns Arena; St. George, UT
Regular season
November 2, 2026*; 7:00 p.m., MW+		at New Mexico	L 60-100	0-1	23 – Gibson	12 – Potter	3 – Tied	The Pit (10,858); Albuquerque, NM
November 4, 2026*; 7:00 p.m., ESPN+		Grace	W 103-52	1-1	17 – Gibson	8 – Gibson	3 – Tied	Burns Arena (1,537); St. George, UT
November 10, 2026*; 7:00 p.m., YouTube		at Utah State	L 86-118	1-2	19 – Tied	11 – Potter	4 – Mackay	Smith Spectrum (8,532); Logan, UT
November 14, 2026*; 3:00 p.m., ACCNX		at California						Haas Pavilion; Berkeley, CA
November 19, 2026*; 7:00 p.m., B1G+		at Washington						Alaska Airlines Arena; Seattle, WA
November 22, 2026*; 12:00 p.m.		vs. South Dakota						Sanford Pentagon; Sioux Falls, SD
November 25, 2026*; 2:00 p.m., ESPN+		Bethesda						Burns Arena; St. George, UT
November 28, 2026*; 5:00 p.m., ESPN+		at Santa Clara						Leavey Center; Santa Clara, CA
December 3, 2026; 7:00 p.m., ESPN+		Weber State						Burns Arena; St. George, UT
December 5, 2026; 7:00 p.m., ESPN+		Idaho State						Burns Arena; St. George, UT
December 10, 2026*; 7:00 p.m., ESPN+		Justice						Burns Arena; St. George, UT
December 14, 2026*; 7:00 p.m., ESPN+		Denver						Burns Arena; St. George, UT
December 18, 2026*; 6:00 p.m., ESPN+		at UC Riverside						SRC Arena; Riverside, CA
December 22, 2026*; 3:00 p.m., ESPN+		at Cal State Fullerton						Titan Gym; Fullerton, CA
December 31, 2026; 7:00 p.m., ESPN+		at Idaho						ICCU Arena; Moscow, ID
January 2, 2027; 3:00 p.m., ESPN+		at Eastern Washington						Reese Court; Cheney, WA
January 7, 2027; 7:00 p.m., ESPN+		Portland State						Burns Arena; St. George, UT
January 9, 2027; 7:00 p.m., ESPN+		Northern Colorado						Burns Arena; St. George, UT
January 14, 2027; 6:00 p.m., ESPN+		at Northern Arizona						Rolle Activity Center; Flagstaff, AZ
January 16, 2027; 7:00 p.m., ESPN+		Southern Utah						Burns Arena; St. George, UT
January 18, 2027; 7:00 p.m., ESPN+		Montana						Burns Arena; St. George, UT
January 25, 2027; 6:00 p.m., ESPN+		at Montana State						Worthington Arena; Bozeman, MT
January 28, 2027; 7:00 p.m., ESPN+		at Idaho State						Reed Gym; Pocatello, ID
January 30, 2027; 1:00 p.m., ESPN+		at Weber State						Dee Events Center; Ogden, UT
February 4, 2027; 7:00 p.m., ESPN+		Eastern Washington						Burns Arena; St. George, UT
February 6, 2027; 7:00 p.m., ESPN+		Idaho						Burns Arena; St. George, UT
February 11, 2027; 7:00 p.m., ESPN+		Northern Arizona						Burns Arena; St. George, UT
February 13, 2027; 6:30 p.m., ESPN+		at Southern Utah						America First Event Center; Cedar City, UT
February 18, 2027; 6:00 p.m., ESPN+		at Northern Colorado						Bank of Colorado Arena; Greeley, CO
February 20, 2027; 3:00 p.m., ESPN+		at Portland State						Viking Pavilion; Portland, OR
February 22, 2027; 7:00 p.m., ESPN+		at Montana						Dahlberg Arena; Missoula, MT
March 1, 2027; 7:00 p.m., ESPN+		Montana State						Burns Arena; St. George, UT
Big Sky tournament
March 5, 2027; TBD, TBD		vs. TBD						Idaho Central Arena; Boise, ID
*Non-conference game. ^{#}Rankings from AP Poll. (#) Tournament seedings in parentheses. All times are in Mountain Time.
