= Patrick Zipfel =

American basketball coach (born 1967)

Weber State Wildcats
- Position: Associate Head Coach
- Conference: Big Sky Conference

Personal information
- Born: October 15, 1967 (age 59)

Career information
- College: Cabrini College
- Coaching career: 1989–present

Career history

Coaching
- 1989–1992: The Citadel (assistant)
- 1992–1993: Bucks County CC
- 1996–1999: Centenary (NJ)
- 1999–2000: Bucks County CC
- 2000–2003: Los Angeles Clippers (assistant)
- 2003–2005: Portland Trail Blazers (assistant)
- 2005–2009: Houston Rockets (assistant)
- 2009–2013: Minnesota Timberwolves (assistant)
- 2013–2015: Chicago Bulls (assistant)
- 2015–2018: Mansfield
- 2018–2019: Minnesota Timberwolves (assistant)
- 2019–2023: Phoenix Suns (assistant)
- 2023–2026: Philadelphia 76ers (assistant)
- 2026–present: Weber State (AHC)

Patrick Zipfel (born October 15, 1967) is an American basketball coach and former college athletics director. He is currently the associate head coach at Weber State University. He previously served as an assistant coach and scout for several NBA teams.

== Early years ==
Zipfel played college basketball at Cabrini College and earned a bachelor's degree in English/Communications in 1989.

== Coaching career ==
=== Early career (1989–2000) ===
Zipfel was an assistant coach at The Citadel from 1989 to 1992. He was awarded his first head coaching job at Bucks County Community College in 1993. In 1996, Zipfel moved on to Centenary College of New Jersey, where he served as their director of athletics and head men's basketball coach.

=== NBA assistant (2000–2015) ===
He next worked for the Los Angeles Clippers as an advance scout, responsible for scouting the Clippers' upcoming opponents and preparing game plans for coaches and players.

Zipfel spent the 2003–04 season as head coach of the New Jersey Squires of the American Basketball Association, leading the Squires into the quarterfinals, where they were defeated by the Kansas City Knights.

From 2003 to 2005, he was an advance scout for the Portland Trail Blazers.

From 2005 to 2009, Zipfel was an assistant coach and advance scout for the Houston Rockets. Houston General Manager Daryl Morey said Zipfel was a "secret weapon" in the Rockets' first-round playoff series victory in 2009, their first playoff series win in more than a decade. "We felt like we were a little tick ahead because we had Pat Zipfel on the bench," said Morey.

In 2009, Zipfel was hired by the Minnesota Timberwolves as an assistant coach and advance scout.

Zipfel spent the summer of 2011 serving as the advance scout for the Ukraine National Team under head coach Mike Fratello.

In 2012, Zipfel served as the Dominican Republic national basketball team advance scout under head coach John Calipari in preparation for the 2012 Olympics. The team won a gold medal at the 2012 Centrobasket, but lost in the pre-Olympic Qualifying tournament.

During his time in the NBA, Zipfel has been called "one of the sharpest strategic minds in the NBA," and was ranked by his NBA peers as "one of the league's best" advanced scouts.

=== Mansfield (2015–2018) ===
In October 2015, Zipfel accepted the head coach position at Mansfield University. Zipfeld coached the Mountaineers for three seasons and compiled a 24–55 record before resigning in September 2018.

=== Return to the NBA (2018–2026) ===
Zipfel returned to the Timberwolves as an assistant coach in 2018.

He joined the Phoenix Suns as an advance scout ahead of the 2019-20 NBA season.

=== Weber State (2026–present) ===
After his time with the Suns and a stint with the Philadelphia 76ers, Zipfel returned to college basketball as the associate head coach at Weber State University under new head coach Kaleb Canales. Zipfel referred to Canales as "the only guy I would leave the NBA for" when his hiring at Weber State was announced.
