= 2026–27 Summit League men's basketball season =

College men's basketball season

- League: NCAA Division I
- Sport: Basketball
- Teams: 8
- TV partner(s): Summit League Network, CBS Sports Network

Regular season

Summit League tournament

Seasons
- ← 2025–26 2027–28 →

2026–27 Summit League men's basketball standings
	Conf.				Overall
Team	W		L	PCT	W		L	PCT
South Dakota State	0	–	0	–	3	–	0	1.000
Omaha	0	–	0	–	2	–	2	.500
St. Thomas	0	–	0	–	2	–	2	.500
Kansas City	0	–	0	–	2	–	3	.400
North Dakota State	0	–	0	–	2	–	3	.400
North Dakota	0	–	0	–	1	–	2	.333
Oral Roberts	0	–	0	–	1	–	2	.333
South Dakota	0	–	0	–	1	–	4	.200
† 2027 Summit League tournament winner As of November 14, 2026; Rankings from AP poll

The 2026–27 Summit League men's basketball season started non-conference play on November 2, 2026, and conference play will start on January 7, 2027. The regular season will conclude on February 27, 2027, and setup the 2027 Summit League men's basketball tournament from March 4–7, 2027.

== Head coaches ==
Team	Head Coach	Previous Job	Years At School (Note: Year at school includes 2026–27 season.)	Record at School (Note: Overall and Summit League records are from the time at their current school and are through the end of the 2025–26 season.)	Summit League Record	Summit League Titles	NCAA tournaments	NCAA Sweet 16's
Kansas City	Mark Turgeon	Maryland	1	0–0	0–0	0	10	1
North Dakota	Paul Sather	Northern State	8	91–132	48–68	0	0	0
North Dakota State	David Richman	North Dakota State (Assistant)	13	238–150	125–79	4	3	0
Omaha	Chris Crutchfield	Oregon (Assistant)	5	62–71	33–33	1	1	0
Oral Roberts	Kory Barnett	West Virginia (Assistant)	2	10–23	4–12	0	0	0
St. Thomas	John Tauer	St. Thomas (Assistant)	15	315–117 (Note: 218 wins and 50 losses at the Division III level)	46–38	0	0 (Note: 8 NCAA Division III Tournaments)	0 (Note: 4 NCAA Division III Sweet 16s, 2 NCAA Division III Final Fours, and 1 NCAA Division III National Championship)
South Dakota	Eric Peterson	Utah (Assistant)	5	56–69	29–37	0	0	0
South Dakota State	Bryan Petersen	South Dakota State (Assistant)	2	14–18	7–9	0	0	0

== Preseason awards ==
The preseason Summit League men's basketball polls were released on October 6, 2026.

=== Preseason Poll ===
First place votes in parenthesis

1. North Dakota State (13) – 418
2. St. Thomas (11) – 410
3. South Dakota State (7) – 396
4. Omaha (1) – 296
5. South Dakota – 240
6. North Dakota – 194
7. Oral Roberts – 183
8. Kansas City – 127

=== Preseason honors ===
Honor	Recipient
Preseason Player of the Year	Joe Sayler, South Dakota State
Preseason All-Summit League First Team	Kendall Blue, St. Thomas
Preseason All-Summit League First Team	Carter Bjerke, St. Thomas
Preseason All-Summit League First Team	Connor Dow, Oral Roberts
Preseason All-Summit League First Team	Austin Herro, St. Thomas
Preseason All-Summit League First Team	Joe Sayler, South Dakota State
Preseason All-Summit League First Team	Andy Stefonowicz, North Dakota State
Preseason All-Summit League Second Team	Vince Buzelis, South Dakota
Preseason All-Summit League Second Team	Kalen Garry, South Dakota State
Preseason All-Summit League Second Team	Jaylen Smith, Kansas City
Preseason All-Summit League Second Team	Grant Stubblefield, Omaha
Preseason All-Summit League Second Team	Jesse Van Kalsbeek, South Dakota State

== Regular season ==
=== Conference standings ===
Current as of October 15, 2026

		Conference		Overall		
Rank	Team	Record	Percent	Record	Percent	Tiebreaker
1	Kansas City	0–0		0–0		
2	North Dakota	0–0		0–0		
3	North Dakota State	0–0		0–0		
4	Omaha	0–0		0–0		
5	St. Thomas	0–0		0–0		
6	Oral Roberts	0–0		0–0		
7	South Dakota	0–0		0–0		
8	South Dakota State	0–0		0–0		

=== Conference matrix ===
	Kansas City	North Dakota	North Dakota State	Omaha	Oral Roberts	St. Thomas	South Dakota	South Dakota State
vs. Kansas City	–	–	–	–	–	–	–	–
vs. North Dakota	–	–	–	–	–	–	–	–
vs. North Dakota State	–	–	–	–	–	–	–	–
vs. Omaha	–	–	–	–	–	–	–	–
vs. Oral Roberts	–	–	–	–	–	–	–	–
vs. St. Thomas	–	–	–	–	–	–	–	–
vs. South Dakota	–	–	–	–	–	–	–	–
vs. South Dakota State	–	–	–	–	–	–	–	–
Total	0–0	0–0	0–0	0–0	0–0	0–0	0–0	0–0

Through October 15, 2026

=== Players of the Week ===
Week	Player(s) of the Week	School

=== Records against other conferences ===
As of November 13, 2026:

Major 6 Conferences	Record	Major 6 Conferences	Record
ACC	None	American	0–1
Big East	0–1	Big Ten	0–2
Big 12	1–1	SEC	0–1
Major 6 Total			1–6
Other Division I Conferences	Record	Other Division I Conferences	Record
Atlantic 10	0–1	ASUN	0–1
America East	None	Big Sky	None
Big South	2–0	Big West	0–2
CAA	None	Conference USA	None
Horizon League	1–2	Ivy League	None
Independents	None	MAAC	None
MAC	None	MEAC	None
MVC	2–1	MWC	0–1
NEC	None	OVC	None
Pac-12	None	Patriot League	None
SoCon	None	Southland	0–1
SWAC	1–0	Sun Belt	None
UAC	0–1	WCC	0–2
Other Division I Total			6–12
NCAA Division I Total			7–18
NCAA Division II Total			2–0
NCAA Division III Total			1–0
NAIA Total			4–0
Total Non-Conference Record			14–18

=== Record against ranked non-conference opponents ===
Summit League records against ranked teams (rankings from AP Poll, Summit teams in Bold):

Date	Visitor	Home	Site	Score	Conference record	Reference
November 6	**Omaha**	No. 25 BYU	Marriott Center; Omaha, NE	**L 67**–108	**0–1**	

=== Points scored ===
Team	For	Against	Difference
Kansas City	0	0	–
North Dakota	0	0	–
North Dakota State	0	0	–
Omaha	0	0	–
Oral Roberts	0	0	–
St. Thomas	0	0	–
South Dakota	0	0	–
South Dakota State	0	0	–

Through October 16, 2026

=== Home attendance ===
Team	Arena	Capacity	Total Games	Average Attendance	Attendance High	Total Attendance	% of Capacity
Kansas City	Municipal Auditorium	7,300	1 (Note: Only games at Municipal will be counted in this table.)	1,694		1,694	23.2%
North Dakota	Betty Engelstad Sioux Center	3,300					%
North Dakota State	Scheels Center	5,460	1	841		841	15.4%
Omaha	Baxter Arena	7,898	1	1,452		1,452	18.4%
Oral Roberts	Mabee Center	10,154	1	3,538		3,538	34.8%
St. Thomas	Lee and Penny Anderson Arena	5,300	2	1,586	1,620; Nov 8 vs. Green Bay	3,173	29.9%
South Dakota	Sanford Coyote Sports Center	6,000	4	1,365	1,395; Nov 2 vs. Mount Marty	5,463	22.8%
South Dakota State	First Bank and Trust Arena	6,500	2	2,970	3,227; Nov 6 vs. Briar Cliff	5,941	45.7%

Bold - Exceed capacity
As of November 13, 2026
Does not include exhibition games

=== National Television Games ===
Any games that league members will play on National Television, including the Summit League's media contract with CBS Sports Network, are listed here.

Summit League members in bold

Date Time (CT)	Road Team	Home team	Final Score	Network
November 29; 3:00 PM	North Dakota State	Boise State	–	The CW
December 6; 3:00 PM	North Dakota State	Washington State	–	The CW
January 7; 7:00 PM	North Dakota State	**St. Thomas**	–	CBSSN
January 29; 8:00 PM	North Dakota State	**North Dakota**	–	CBSSN
January 31; 1:00 PM	South Dakota State	**Omaha**	–	CBSSN
February 6; 1:00 PM	Oral Roberts	**South Dakota**	–	CBSSN
February 13; 1:00 PM	South Dakota	**South Dakota State**	–	CBSSN
February 21; 1:00 PM	Kansas City	**Omaha**	–	CBSSN
February 21; 3:00 PM	Oral Roberts	**St. Thomas**	–	CBSSN

== Postseason ==
=== Conference tournament ===
All 8 teams will qualify for the 2027 Summit League men's basketball tournament. The tournament will be held at the Denny Sanford Premier Center in Sioux Falls, South Dakota from March 4 to 7, 2027.

Quarterfinals; March 4 & 5 MidcoSN/SLN
1
8
4
5
2
7
3
6

Semifinals; March 6 CBSSN

Championship; March 7 CBSSN
