= 2026–27 South Dakota State Jackrabbits men's basketball team =

American college basketball season

2026–27 South Dakota State Jackrabbits men's basketball
- Conference: Summit League
- Record: 5–0 (0–0 Summit)
- Head coach: Bryan Petersen (2nd season)
- Associate head coach: Cole Christian
- Assistant coaches: Ryan Kirsch; Nick Smith; Jahenns Manigat; Jamal Nixon
- Home arena: First Bank & Trust Arena

2026–27 Summit League men's basketball standings
	Conf.				Overall
Team	W		L	PCT	W		L	PCT
South Dakota State	0	–	0	–	5	–	0	1.000
Kansas City	0	–	0	–	3	–	3	.500
Omaha	0	–	0	–	3	–	3	.500
St. Thomas	0	–	0	–	3	–	3	.500
North Dakota	0	–	0	–	2	–	3	.400
Oral Roberts	0	–	0	–	2	–	3	.400
North Dakota State	0	–	0	–	2	–	4	.333
South Dakota	0	–	0	–	2	–	4	.333
† 2027 Summit League tournament winner As of November 19, 2026; Rankings from AP poll

The 2026–27 South Dakota State Jackrabbits men's basketball team represents South Dakota State University in the 2026–27 NCAA Division I men's basketball season. The Jackrabbits, who are led by second-year head coach Bryan Petersen, play home games at First Bank & Trust Arena in Brookings, South Dakota as members of the Summit League.

== Previous season ==
The Jackrabbits finished the 2025–26 season 14–18, 7–9 in Summit League play to finish in seventh place. In the Summit League tournament, they would fall to St. Thomas in the quarterfinals.

== Roster ==
2026–27 South Dakota State Jackrabbits men's basketball team
Players
Coaches

Pos.	#	Name	Height	Weight	Year	Previous school	Hometown
G	0	Trey Buchanan	6 ft 1 in (1.85 m)	190 lb (86 kg)	So	Iowa	Westfield, IN
G	1	Semaj Stampley	6 ft 1 in (1.85 m)	180 lb (82 kg)	Fr	Alton High School	Alton, IL
G	3	Joe Sayler	6 ft 3 in (1.91 m)	195 lb (88 kg)	Jr	White River High School	White River, SD
F	4	Youssouf Yatabare	6 ft 9 in (2.06 m)	230 lb (104 kg)	Fr	Nanterre 92	Paris, France
F	5	Jon Mekonnen	6 ft 8 in (2.03 m)	205 lb (93 kg)	So	Colorado State	Eagan, MN
G	6	Jaden Rogers	6 ft 6 in (1.98 m)	215 lb (98 kg)	So	Sunrise Christian Academy	Waukee, IA
G	7	EJ Ryans	6 ft 3 in (1.91 m)	190 lb (86 kg)	Jr	Western Michigan	Grand Rapids, MI
G	10	Kalen Garry	6 ft 3 in (1.91 m)	200 lb (91 kg)	Sr	De Smet High School	De Smet, SD
G	11	Cam Swearengen	6 ft 5 in (1.96 m)	205 lb (93 kg)	Fr	Webb School of Knoxville	Knoxville, TN
F	21	Myles Thompson	6 ft 7 in (2.01 m)	230 lb (104 kg)	GS	SIU Edwardsville	Hutchinson, KS
F	22	Davis Kern	6 ft 9 in (2.06 m)	230 lb (104 kg)	RS Fr	Linn-Mar High School	Marion, IA
F	23	Blake Ellwein	6 ft 9 in (2.06 m)	220 lb (100 kg)	Fr	Huron High School	Huron, SD
G	33	Jadyn Cascio Jensen	6 ft 3 in (1.91 m)	195 lb (88 kg)	So	Bellevue West High School	Bellevue, NE
C	35	Alec Squires	6 ft 10 in (2.08 m)	250 lb (113 kg)	So	Sioux Valley High School	Volga, SD
F	42	Jesse Van Kalsbeek	6 ft 6 in (1.98 m)	225 lb (102 kg)	Jr	Northwestern (IA)	Sheldon, IA

Head coach

- Bryan Petersen (Iowa State)

Assistant coach(es)

- Ryan Kirsch (Iowa State)
- Nick Smith (Southwest Minnesota State)
- Jahenns Manigat (Creighton)
- Jamal Nixon (Oklahoma)
- Tucker Wookey (South Dakota State)

Legend

- (C) Team captain
- (S) Suspended
- (I) Ineligible
- (W) Walk-on
- Injured
- Current redshirt

Roster
Last update: October 27, 2026

== Schedule and results ==
Date time, TV	Rank^{#}	Opponent^{#}	Result	Record	Site (attendance) city, state
Non–conference regular season
November 3, 2026*; 7:00 p.m., ESPN+		at Kansas State	W 68–66	1–0	Bramlage Coliseum (7,047); Manhattan, KS
November 6, 2026*; 8:30 p.m., Summit League Network		Briar Cliff	W 71–49	2–0	First Bank & Trust Arena (3,227); Brookings, SD
November 11, 2026*; 7:00 p.m., SLN		Valparaiso	W 81–69	3–0	First Bank & Trust Arena (2,714); Brookings, SD
November 14, 2026*; 3:00 p.m., SLN		vs. Northern Colorado	W 71-46	4-0	The Monument (2,545); Rapid City, SD
November 16, 2026*; 7:00 p.m., SLN		Mayville State	W 107-67	5-0	First Bank & Trust Arena (1,920); Brookings, SD
November 20, 2026*; 3:00 p.m., ESPN+		at Idaho State			Reed Gym; Pocatello, ID
November 25, 2026*; 1:00 p.m., SLN		Abilene Christian			First Bank & Trust Arena; Brookings, SD
November 28, 2026*; 4:30 p.m., TBD		vs. South Alabama; Second Line Showcase			XULA Convocation Center; New Orleans, LA
November 29, 2026*; 4:30 p.m., TBD		vs. Fresno State; Second Line Showcase			XULA Convocation Center; New Orleans, LA
December 5, 2026*; 6:00 p.m., ESPN+		at Abilene Christian			Moody Coliseum; Abilene, TX
December 8, 2026*; 7:00 p.m., SLN		Milwaukee			First Bank & Trust Arena; Brookings, SD
December 12, 2026*; TBD, SLN		Idaho			First Bank & Trust Arena; Brookings, SD
December 14, 2026*; 7:00 p.m., SLN		Buena Vista			First Bank & Trust Arena; Brookings, SD
December 18, 2026*; 6:00 p.m., ESPN+		at Eastern Kentucky			Alumni Coliseum; Richmond, KY
December 21, 2026*; 7:00 p.m., SLN		vs. Green Bay			Sanford Pentagon; Sioux Falls, SD
December 29, 2026*; 9:00 p.m., TBD		at Nevada			Lawlor Events Center; Reno, NV
January 2, 2027*; 4:30 p.m., SLN		Dakota Wesleyan			First Bank & Trust Arena; Brookings, SD
Summit League regular season
January 7, 2027; 7:00 p.m., SLN		at Kansas City			Municipal Auditorium; Kansas City, MO
January 9, 2027; 7:00 p.m., SLN		at Oral Roberts			Mabee Center; Tulsa, OK
January 15, 2027; 7:00 p.m., SLN		at South Dakota			Sanford Coyote Sports Center; Vermillion, SD
January 21, 2027; 7:00 p.m., SLN		North Dakota State			First Bank & Trust Arena; Brookings, SD
January 23, 2027; 2:00 p.m., SLN		North Dakota			First Bank & Trust Arena; Brookings, SD
January 28, 2027; 7:00 p.m., SLN		at St. Thomas			Lee & Penny Anderson Arena; St. Paul, MN
January 31, 2027; 1:00 p.m., CBSSN		at Omaha			Baxter Arena; Omaha, NE
February 4, 2027; 7:00 p.m., SLN		Oral Roberts			First Bank & Trust Arena; Brookings, SD
February 6, 2027; 2:00 p.m., SLN		Kansas City			First Bank & Trust Arena; Brookings, SD
February 13, 2027; 1:00 p.m., CBSSN		South Dakota			First Bank & Trust Arena; Brookings, SD
February 18, 2027; 7:00 p.m., SLN		at North Dakota			Betty Engelstad Sioux Center; Brookings, SD
February 20, 2027; 1:00 p.m., SLN		at North Dakota State			Scheels Center; Fargo, ND
February 25, 2027; 7:00 p.m., SLN		Omaha			First Bank & Trust Arena; Brookings, SD
February 27, 2027; 2:00 p.m., SLN		St. Thomas			First Bank & Trust Arena; Brookings, SD
Summit League tournament
March 4–7, 2027*; TBD, SLN/CBSSN		vs. Summit League tournament			Denny Sanford Premier Center; Sioux Falls, SD
*Non-conference game. ^{#}Rankings from AP Poll. (#) Tournament seedings in parentheses. All times are in Central.
