= 2026–27 South Dakota Coyotes men's basketball team =

American college basketball season

2026–27 South Dakota Coyotes men's basketball
- Conference: Summit League
- Record: 2–5 (0–0 Summit)
- Head coach: Eric Peterson (5th season)
- Associate head coach: Matt Murken
- Assistant coaches: Triston Simpson; Joe White; Jovan Coleman; Dhruv Mehrotra
- Home arena: Sanford Coyote Sports Center

2026–27 Summit League men's basketball standings
	Conf.				Overall
Team	W		L	PCT	W		L	PCT
South Dakota State	0	–	0	–	5	–	0	1.000
Kansas City	0	–	0	–	3	–	3	.500
Omaha	0	–	0	–	3	–	3	.500
St. Thomas	0	–	0	–	3	–	3	.500
North Dakota	0	–	0	–	2	–	3	.400
Oral Roberts	0	–	0	–	2	–	3	.400
North Dakota State	0	–	0	–	2	–	4	.333
South Dakota	0	–	0	–	2	–	4	.333
† 2027 Summit League tournament winner As of November 19, 2026; Rankings from AP poll

The 2026–27 South Dakota Coyotes men's basketball team represents the University of South Dakota during the 2026–27 NCAA Division I men's basketball season. The Coyotes, who are led by fifth-year head coach Eric Peterson, play home games at the Sanford Coyote Sports Center in Vermillion, South Dakota as members of the Summit League.

== Previous season ==
The Coyotes finished the 2025–26 season 16–16, 8–8 in Summit League play, to finish in fourth place. In the Summit League tournament, they lost to Omaha in the quarterfinals.

== Roster ==
2026–27 South Dakota Coyotes men's basketball team
Players
Coaches

Pos.	#	Name	Height	Weight	Year	Previous school	Hometown
G	0	Marvin Richard III	6 ft 0 in (1.83 m)	—	Fr	Pine Ridge School	Pine Ridge, SD
G	2	Cade Kelderman	6 ft 1 in (1.85 m)	—	Sr	Iowa State	Waukee, IA
G	3	Michael Nee	6 ft 2 in (1.88 m)	—	Fr	Glenbard East High School	Lombard, IL
G	4	Vince Buzelis	6 ft 4 in (1.93 m)	—	So	Hinsdale Central High School	Willowbrook, IL
G	5	Elisha Warren	6 ft 3 in (1.91 m)	—	RS Sr	D'Youville	Woodhaven, MI
G	6	Melo Sanchez	6 ft 4 in (1.93 m)	—	Sr	Central Connecticut	San Diego, CA
F	8	Josh Townley-Thomas	6 ft 10 in (2.08 m)	—	RS Jr	Creighton	Omaha, NE
G	9	Kajus Kublickas	6 ft 2 in (1.88 m)	—	Sr	Pacific	Kaunas, Lithuania
G	13	Josiah Dotzler	6 ft 3 in (1.91 m)	—	RS Jr	Saint Louis	Omaha, NE
C	15	Stef van Bussel	6 ft 10 in (2.08 m)	—	RS Jr	Duquesne	Ommel, Netherlands
G	19	Iliam Fevry	6 ft 5 in (1.96 m)	—	So	Arizona Western	Paris, France
F	21	Ethan Kizer	6 ft 5 in (1.96 m)	—	RS Jr	South Alabama	Metamora, IL
F	22	Brandon Domsch	6 ft 7 in (2.01 m)	—	So	North Platte Community College	Broomfield, CO
F	33	Tyler Netolicky	6 ft 10 in (2.08 m)	—	Jr	Kirkwood Community College	Cedar Rapids, IA
F	34	Jake Brack	6 ft 9 in (2.06 m)	—	Sr	Skutt Catholic High School	Omaha, NE
G	44	Jahni Summers	6 ft 6 in (1.98 m)	—	Sr	Sacramento State	Evansville, IN

Head coach

- Eric Peterson (UW–La Crosse)

Assistant coach(es)

- Matt Murken (Concordia–Nebraska)
- Triston Simpson (South Dakota)
- Joe White (Idaho State)
- Jovan Coleman (Creighton)
- Dhruv Mehrotra (Haverford)

Legend

- (C) Team captain
- (S) Suspended
- (I) Ineligible
- (W) Walk-on
- Injured
- Current redshirt

Roster
Last update: October 28, 2026

== Schedule and results ==
Date time, TV	Rank^{#}	Opponent^{#}	Result	Record	Site (attendance) city, state
Non–conference regular season
November 2, 2026*; 5:00 p.m., Summit League Network		Mount Marty	W 95–57	1–0	Sanford Coyote Sports Center (1,395); Vermillion, SD
November 4, 2026*; 7:00 p.m., SLN		Northern Kentucky	L 94–102	1–1	Sanford Coyote Sports Center (1,352); Vermillion, SD
November 7, 2026*; 1:00 p.m., SLN		Cal State Fullerton	L 85–87	1–2	Sanford Coyote Sports Center (1,382); Vermillion, SD
November 10, 2026*; 7:00 p.m., SLN		Houston Christian	L 76–87	1–3	Sanford Coyote Sports Center (1,334); Vermillion, SD
November 13, 2026*; 6:30 p.m., ESPN+		at Drake	L 72–81	1–4	Knapp Center (3,343); Des Moines, IA
November 15, 2026*; 3:30 p.m., SLN		Doane	W 81–57	2–4	Sanford Coyote Sports Center (1,224); Vermillion, SD
November 18, 2026*; 7:30 p.m., BIG+		at No. 24 Nebraska	L 47–73	2–5	Pinnacle Bank Arena (14,920); Lincoln, NE
November 22, 2026*; 1:00 p.m.		vs. Utah Tech			Sanford Pentagon; Sioux Falls, SD
November 25, 2026*; 1:00 p.m., SLN		Arkansas–Pine Bluff			Sanford Coyote Sports Center; Vermillion, SD
November 27, 2026*; 1:00 p.m., SLN		at Clarke			Sanford Coyote Sports Center; Vermillion, SD
November 30, 2026*; 7:00 p.m., SLN		Montana State			Sanford Coyote Sports Center; Vermillion, SD
December 3, 2026*; 6:00 p.m., ESPN+		at North Florida			UNF Arena; Jacksonville, FL
December 5, 2026*; 6:00 p.m., ESPN+		at San Francisco			War Memorial Gymnasium; San Francisco, CA
December 8, 2026*; 8:00 p.m., ESPN+		at Montana			Dahlberg Arena; Missoula, MT
December 12, 2026*; 1:00 p.m., SLN		North Florida			Sanford Coyote Sports Center; Vermillion, SD
December 19, 2026*; 1:00 p.m., SLN		Chicago State			Sanford Coyote Sports Center; Vermillion, SD
December 29, 2026*; 7:30 p.m., BIG+		at Iowa			Carver–Hawkeye Arena; Iowa City, IA
January 2, 2027*; 4:00 p.m., SLN		Ozark Christian			Sanford Coyote Sports Center; Vermillion, SD
Summit League regular season
January 7, 2027; 7:00 p.m., SLN		at Oral Roberts			Mabee Center; Tulsa, OK
January 9, 2027; 2:00 p.m.		at Kansas City			Municipal Auditorium; Kansas City, MO
January 15, 2027; 7:00 p.m., SLN		South Dakota State			Sanford Coyote Sports Center; Vermillion, SD
January 21, 2027; 7:00 p.m., SLN		North Dakota			Sanford Coyote Sports Center; Vermillion, SD
January 23, 2027; 1:00 p.m., SLN		North Dakota State			Sanford Coyote Sports Center; Vermillion, SD
January 28, 2027; 7:00 p.m., SLN		at Omaha			Baxter Arena; Omaha, NE
January 30, 2027; 6:00 p.m., SLN		at St. Thomas			Lee & Penny Anderson Arena; St. Paul, MN
February 4, 2027; 7:00 p.m., SLN		Kansas City			Sanford Coyote Sports Center; Vermillion, SD
February 6, 2027; 1:00 p.m., CBSSN		Oral Roberts			Sanford Coyote Sports Center; Vermillion, SD
February 13, 2027; 1:00 p.m., CBSSN		at South Dakota State			First Bank & Trust Arena; Brookings, SD
February 18, 2027; 7:00 p.m., SLN		at North Dakota State			Scheels Center; Fargo, ND
February 20, 2027; 1:00 p.m., SLN		at North Dakota			Betty Engelstad Sioux Center; Grand Forks, ND
February 25, 2027; 7:00 p.m., SLN		St. Thomas			Sanford Coyote Sports Center; Vermillion, SD
February 27, 2027; 1:00 p.m., SLN		Omaha			Sanford Coyote Sports Center; Vermillion, SD
Summit League tournament
March 4–7, 2027*; TBD, SLN/CBSSN		vs. Summit League tournament			Denny Sanford Premier Center; Sioux Falls, SD
*Non-conference game. ^{#}Rankings from AP Poll. (#) Tournament seedings in parentheses. All times are in Central.
