= 2026–27 Kansas City Roos men's basketball team =

American college basketball season

2026–27 Kansas City Roos men's basketball
- Conference: Summit League
- Record: 2–3 (0–0 Summit)
- Head coach: Mark Turgeon (1st season)
- Associate head coach: Mike Rohn
- Assistant coaches: David Cason; Brandon Burgette; Will Turgeon; Sean Foley
- Home arena: Municipal Auditorium

2026–27 Summit League men's basketball standings
	Conf.				Overall
Team	W		L	PCT	W		L	PCT
South Dakota State	0	–	0	–	5	–	0	1.000
Omaha	0	–	0	–	3	–	2	.600
St. Thomas	0	–	0	–	3	–	3	.500
Oral Roberts	0	–	0	–	2	–	2	.500
Kansas City	0	–	0	–	2	–	3	.400
North Dakota State	0	–	0	–	2	–	4	.333
South Dakota	0	–	0	–	2	–	4	.333
North Dakota	0	–	0	–	1	–	3	.250
† 2027 Summit League tournament winner As of November 18, 2026; Rankings from AP poll

The 2026–27 Kansas City Roos men's basketball team represents the University of Missouri–Kansas City during the 2026–27 NCAA Division I men's basketball season. The Roos are led by first-year head coach Mark Turgeon, who takes over for former coach Marvin Menzies who was let go after the 2025–26 season. The Roos play home games at the Municipal Auditorium in Kansas City, Missouri, as members of the Summit League.

== Previous season ==
The Roos finished the 2025–26 season 4–27, 1–15 in Summit League play, to finish in ninth place. In the Summit League tournament, they would fall to Oral Roberts in the first round.

== Roster ==
2026–27 Kansas City Roos men's basketball team
Players
Coaches

Pos.	#	Name	Height	Weight	Year	Previous school	Hometown
G	0	Elliot Moskowitz	6 ft 4 in (1.93 m)	180 lb (82 kg)	Fr	Colorado Preparatory School	Superior, CO
G	1	DJ Jackson Jr.	6 ft 1 in (1.85 m)	175 lb (79 kg)	Fr	Piper High School	Kansas City, KS
F	2	Sebastian Hartmann	6 ft 6 in (1.98 m)	210 lb (95 kg)	Sr	Eastern Washington	Munich, Germany
G	4	Jaylen Smith	5 ft 11 in (1.8 m)	175 lb (79 kg)	Sr	North Florida	Orlando, FL
G	5	Cameron Love	6 ft 4 in (1.93 m)	170 lb (77 kg)	Fr	Olathe North High School	Kansas City, KS
F	6	Jibbe Sicking	6 ft 8 in (2.03 m)	235 lb (107 kg)	Fr	ZZ Leiden	Amsterdam, Netherlands
G	7	Josh Kori	6 ft 4 in (1.93 m)	195 lb (88 kg)	Fr	Oak Park High School	Kansas City, MO
G	8	Carl Daughtery Jr.	6 ft 3 in (1.91 m)	—	GS	Central Arkansas	Maumelle, AR
F/C	9	Assane Diop	6 ft 9 in (2.06 m)	215 lb (98 kg)	Sr	Colorado	Dakar, Senegal
F/C	10	Atuka Bakhtadze	7 ft 0 in (2.13 m)	235 lb (107 kg)	Fr	Dream City Christian School	Kutaisi, Georgia
F	12	Mykel Bruce-McCrommon	6 ft 7 in (2.01 m)	175 lb (79 kg)	Fr	Gateway High School	Pittsburgh, PA
F	15	Dovydas Jencius	6 ft 10 in (2.08 m)	215 lb (98 kg)	Fr	Balboa Sports Academy	Klaipeda, Lithuania
G	20	Lincoln Goodwin	6 ft 6 in (1.98 m)	175 lb (79 kg)	Fr	Benton High School	St. Joseph, MO
F/C	21	Raivo Butirins	6 ft 9 in (2.06 m)	210 lb (95 kg)	Jr	VEF Rīga	Lapmežciems, Latvia
G	26	Matija Samar	6 ft 6 in (1.98 m)	205 lb (93 kg)	So	Oregon State	Jesenice, Slovenia

Head coach

- Mark Turgeon (Kansas)

Assistant coach(es)

- Mike Rohn (McPherson)
- David Cason (Illinois State)
- Brandon Burgette (Central Missouri)
- Will Turgeon (Colorado)
- Sean Foley (McDaniel)

Legend

- (C) Team captain
- (S) Suspended
- (I) Ineligible
- (W) Walk-on
- Injured
- Current redshirt

Roster
Last update: October 27, 2026

== Schedule and results ==
Date time, TV	Rank^{#}	Opponent^{#}	Result	Record	High points	High rebounds	High assists	Site (attendance) city, state
Exhibition
October 24, 2026*; 11:30 a.m.		Montana State	W 64–54	–	20 – Smith	11 – Diop	4 – Smith	Municipal Auditorium; Kansas City, MO
Non–conference regular season
November 2, 2026*; 7:00 p.m., ESPN+		at Creighton	L 61–76	0–1	15 – Smith	7 – Hartmann	5 – Smith	CHI Health Center Omaha (15,980); Omaha, NE
November 6, 2026*; 7:30 p.m., Summit League Network		Southern Illinois	W 100–93	1–1	19 – Goodwin	9 – Hartmann	6 – Tied (2)	Municipal Auditorium (1,694); Kansas City, MO
November 9, 2026*; 7:00 p.m., ESPN+		at Jacksonville	L 61–79	1–2	11 – Sicking	7 – Tied (2)	5 – Smith	Swisher Gymnasium (789); Jacksonville, FL
November 11, 2026*; 11:00 a.m., YouTube		vs. Florida A&M; Showdown in St. Pete	W 87–65	2–2	21 – Sicking	16 – Diop	6 – Goodwin	McArthur Center (362); St. Petersburg, FL
November 12, 2026*; 2:00 p.m., YouTube		vs. George Mason; Showdown in St. Pete	L 68–76	2–3	22 – Smith	6 – Diop	3 – Smith	McArthur Center (202); St. Petersburg, FL
November 17, 2026*; 7:00 p.m., SLN		Newman	W 68-64	3-3	–	–	–	Municipal Auditorium (2,751); Kansas City, MO
November 20, 2026*; 6:00 p.m., ESPN+		at Iona						Hynes Athletics Center; New Rochelle, NY
November 24, 2026*; 7:00 p.m., SLN		Green Bay						Municipal Auditorium; Kansas City, MO
November 28, 2026*; 2:00 p.m., SLN		Southeast Missouri State						Municipal Auditorium; Kansas City, MO
November 30, 2026*; 7:00 p.m., SLN		Peru State						Swinney Recreation Center; Kansas City, MO
December 5, 2026*; TBA, TBD		at Duquesne; Morgan & Morgan Classic						St. Vincent–St. Mary High School; Akron, OH
December 8, 2026*; 5:30 p.m., SLN		Denver; Fountain City Happy Hour Classic						Municipal Auditorium; Kansas City, MO
December 9, 2026*; 5:30 p.m., SLN		Eastern Illinois; Fountain City Happy Hour Classic						Municipal Auditorium; Kansas City, MO
December 12, 2026*; 3:30 p.m., ESPN+		at Southeast Missouri State						Show Me Center; Cape Girardeau, MO
December 19, 2026*; 2:00 p.m., SLN		Lindenwood						Municipal Auditorium; Kansas City, MO
December 21, 2026*; 2:00 p.m., SLN		SIU Edwardsville						Municipal Auditorium; Kansas City, MO
December 30, 2026*; 7:30 p.m., SLN		Lincoln (MO)						Municipal Auditorium; Kansas City, MO
January 2, 2027*; 2:00 p.m., SLN		Spurgeon						Municipal Auditorium; Kansas City, MO
Summit League regular season
January 7, 2027; 7:00 p.m., SLN		South Dakota State						Municipal Auditorium; Kansas City, MO
January 9, 2027; 2:00 p.m., SLN		South Dakota						Municipal Auditorium; Kansas City, MO
January 14, 2027; 7:00 p.m., SLN		at North Dakota State						Scheels Center; Fargo, ND
January 16, 2027; 1:00 p.m., SLN		at North Dakota						Betty Engelstad Sioux Center; Grand Forks, ND
January 21, 2027; 7:00 p.m., SLN		Omaha						Municipal Auditorium; Kansas City, MO
January 23, 2027; 7:00 p.m., SLN		St. Thomas						Municipal Auditorium; Kansas City, MO
January 30, 2027; 7:00 p.m., SLN		Oral Roberts						Municipal Auditorium; Kansas City, MO
February 4, 2027; TBA, SLN		at South Dakota						Sanford Coyote Sports Center; Vermillion, SD
February 6, 2027; TBA, SLN		at South Dakota State						First Bank & Trust Arena; Brookings, SD
February 11, 2027; 7:00 p.m., SLN		North Dakota						Swinney Recreation Center; Kansas City, MO
February 13, 2027; 2:00 p.m., SLN		at North Dakota State						Swinney Recreation Center; Kansas City, MO
February 18, 2027; 7:00 p.m., SLN		at St. Thomas						Lee & Penny Anderson Arena; St. Paul, MN
February 21, 2027; 1:00 p.m., CBSSN		at Omaha						Baxter Arena; Omaha, NE
February 27, 2027; TBA, SLN		at Oral Roberts						Mabee Center; Tulsa, OK
Summit League tournament
March 4–7, 2027*; TBA, SLN/CBSSN		vs. Summit League tournament						Denny Sanford Premier Center; Sioux Falls, SD
*Non-conference game. ^{#}Rankings from AP Poll. (#) Tournament seedings in parentheses. All times are in Central.
