= 2026–27 North Dakota Fighting Hawks men's basketball team =

American college basketball season

2026–27 North Dakota Fighting Hawks men's basketball
- Conference: Summit League
- Record: 3–3 (0–0 Summit)
- Head coach: Paul Sather (8th season)
- Assistant coaches: Jamie Stevens; Estevan Sandoval; A.J. Holland
- Home arena: Betty Engelstad Sioux Center

2026–27 Summit League men's basketball standings
	Conf.				Overall
Team	W		L	PCT	W		L	PCT
South Dakota State	0	–	0	–	5	–	1	.833
St. Thomas	0	–	0	–	4	–	3	.571
North Dakota	0	–	0	–	3	–	3	.500
Omaha	0	–	0	–	3	–	3	.500
Kansas City	0	–	0	–	3	–	4	.429
Oral Roberts	0	–	0	–	2	–	3	.400
North Dakota State	0	–	0	–	2	–	5	.286
South Dakota	0	–	0	–	2	–	5	.286
† 2027 Summit League tournament winner As of November 22, 2026; Rankings from AP poll

The 2026–27 North Dakota Fighting Hawks men's basketball team represents the University of North Dakota during the 2026–27 NCAA Division I men's basketball season as members of the Summit League. The Fighting Hawks are led by eighth-year head coach Paul Sather and play their home games at the Betty Engelstad Sioux Center in Grand Forks, North Dakota.

== Previous season ==
The Fighting Hawks finished the 2025–26 season 18–17, 10–6 in Summit League play, finishing in 3rd place. They made it to the championship game of the 2026 Summit League tournament, where they lost to North Dakota State by a score of 62–70.

== Offseason ==
=== Departures ===
North Dakota departures
Name	Number	Pos.	Height	Weight	Year	Hometown	Reason for departures
Marley Curtis	0	F	6'8"	230	Freshman	St. Louis Park, MN	Transferred to James Madison
Eli King	2	G	6'3"	193	Senior	Caledonia, MN	Out of eligibility
Greyson Uelman	3	G	6'2"	185	Freshman	Excelsior, MN	Transferred to Northern Iowa
Matthew Bothun	5	F	6'9"	220	Sophomore	St. Francis, MN	Transferred to Kentucky Wesleyan
Anthony Smith III	9	G	6'1"	170	Freshman	Hopkins, MN	Transferred to Winthrop
Micah Curtis	10	F	6'8"	230	Freshman	St. Louis Park, MN	Transferred to Wyoming
Reggie Thomas	11	G	6'1"	200	Senior	Omaha, NE	Out of eligibility
George Natsvlishvili	13	F	6'10"	239	Junior	Tbilisi, Georgia	Transferred to Winthrop
Ryan Erikson	15	F/C	6'10"	250	Sophomore	Bismarck, ND	Transferred to Minot State
Garrett Anderson	16	G	6'6"	195	Senior	Phoenix, AZ	Out of eligibility
Wylee Delorme	23	G	6'5"	200	Sophomore	Devils Lake, ND	Transferred to Jamestown
Anthony Doppler	33	G	6'4"	200	Sophomore	Bismarck, ND	Entered transfer portal

=== Recruiting class ===
==== Incoming transfers ====
North Dakota incoming transfers
Name	Number	Pos.	Height	Weight	Year	Hometown	Previous School
Tyler Wagner	5	G	6'5"	197	Sophomore	Brooklyn Park, MN	Austin Peay
Jayden Thomas	8	F	6'7"	205	Junior	Austin, TX	Lee
Samuel Hincapie	12	G	6'6"	185	Senior	Medellin, Colombia	Le Moyne
Luke Winkel	14	G	6'0"	195	Junior	Ankeny, IA	St. Cloud State
Zack Parks	23	G	6'6"	180	Sophomore	Lake Orion, MI	Mid Michigan
Daemon Ely	52	F	6'8"	220	Junior	Taos, NM	Angelina

==== 2026 recruiting class ====
College recruiting
Name	Hometown	School	Height	Weight	Commit date
Carter Evanson; Guard	Horace, ND	Horace HS	6 ft 3 in (1.91 m)	N/A	
Carter Evanson; Guard	Recruit ratings: No ratings found				
Jayden Moore; Guard	Hopkins, MN	Hopkins HS	5 ft 10 in (1.78 m)	170 lb (77 kg)	
Jayden Moore; Guard	Recruit ratings: Rivals: 247Sports: On3: ESPN: (82)				
DeAngelo Dungey; Guard	Minneapolis, MN	Tinto–Grace HS	6 ft 4 in (1.93 m)	N/A	
DeAngelo Dungey; Guard	Recruit ratings: No ratings found				
Andrija Radojevic; Forward	Kruševac, Serbia		6 ft 6 in (1.98 m)	N/A	
Andrija Radojevic; Forward	Recruit ratings: No ratings found				
Sage Hanson; Guard	Towner, ND	Towner–Granville HS	6 ft 9 in (2.06 m)	N/A	
Sage Hanson; Guard	Recruit ratings: No ratings found				
Overall recruit ranking:
Note: In many cases, Scout, Rivals, 247Sports, On3, and ESPN may conflict in their listings of height and weight.; In these cases, the average was taken. ESPN grades are on a 100-point scale.; Sources:

== Roster ==
2026–27 North Dakota Fighting Hawks men's basketball team
Players
Coaches

Pos.	#	Name	Height	Weight	Year	Hometown
G	0	Carter Evanson	6 ft 3 in (1.91 m)	180 lb (82 kg)	Fr	Horace, ND
G	1	Zach Kraft	6 ft 3 in (1.91 m)	185 lb (84 kg)	Jr	Grand Forks, ND
G	2	Jayden Moore	6 ft 0 in (1.83 m)	185 lb (84 kg)	Fr	Hopkins, MN
G	3	DeAngelo Dungey	6 ft 4 in (1.93 m)	175 lb (79 kg)	Fr	Minneapolis, MN
F	4	Karson Ouse	6 ft 7 in (2.01 m)	195 lb (88 kg)	So	Kindred, ND
G	5	Tyler Wagner	6 ft 6 in (1.98 m)	200 lb (91 kg)	So	Brooklyn Park, MN
F	8	Jayden Thomas	6 ft 7 in (2.01 m)	205 lb (93 kg)	Jr	Austin, TX
G	12	Samuel Hincapie	6 ft 6 in (1.98 m)	200 lb (91 kg)	Sr	Medellin, Colombia
G	14	Luke Winkel	6 ft 0 in (1.83 m)	195 lb (88 kg)	Jr	Ankeny, IA
F	15	Andrija Radojevic	6 ft 8 in (2.03 m)	237 lb (108 kg)	Jr	Kruševac, Serbia
C	22	Josh Jones	6 ft 9 in (2.06 m)	245 lb (111 kg)	Sr	Austin, TX
G	23	Zack Parks	6 ft 6 in (1.98 m)	185 lb (84 kg)	So	Lake Orion, MI
G	32	Sage Hanson	6 ft 9 in (2.06 m)	221 lb (100 kg)	Fr	Towner, ND
F	52	Daemon Ely	6 ft 8 in (2.03 m)	220 lb (100 kg)	Jr	Taos, NM

Head coach

- Paul Sather (Northern State)

Assistant coach(es)

- Jamie Stevens (MSU Billings)
- Estevan Sandoval (New Mexico)
- A.J. Holland (Sioux Falls)

Legend

- (C) Team captain
- (S) Suspended
- (I) Ineligible
- (W) Walk-on
- Injured
- Current redshirt

Roster
Last update: August 13, 2026

== Schedule and results ==
Date time, TV	Rank^{#}	Opponent^{#}	Result	Record	High points	High rebounds	High assists	Site (attendance) city, state
Non–conference regular season
November 2, 2026*; 8:00 p.m., BIG+		at Minnesota	L 50–85	0–1	13 – Moore	6 – Parks	2 – Tied (3)	Williams Arena (7,222); Minneapolis, MN
November 7, 2026*; 11:00 a.m., ESPN+		at Winthrop	W 93–90	1–1	24 – Hincapie	7 – Hincapie	6 – Winkel	Winthrop Coliseum (1,465); Rock Hill, SC
November 9, 2026*; 6:00 p.m., ACCNX		at Clemson	L 77–92	1–2	22 – Hincapie	3 – Thomas	3 – Moore	Littlejohn Coliseum (5,671); Clemson, SC
November 14, 2026*; 8:00 p.m., Midco Sports/Summit League Network		Montana	L 71–80	1–3	21 – Winkel	6 – Kraft	3 – Tied (3)	Betty Engelstad Sioux Center (876); Grand Forks, ND
November 17, 2026*; 7:00 p.m., Midco Sports/SLN		SIUE	W 83–78 ^{OT}	2–3	24 – Hincapie	6 – Tied (2)	6 – Winkel	Betty Engelstad Sioux Center (677); Grand Forks, ND
November 19, 2026*; 7:00 p.m., SLN		Mayville State	W 91–66	3–3	14 – Thomas	9 – Hanson	9 – Moore	Betty Engelstad Sioux Center (1,714); Grand Forks, ND
November 24, 2026*; 2:00 p.m., Triple Crown Sports Network		vs. Detroit Mercy; Cancún Challenge Mayan Division semifinal						Hard Rock Hotel Riviera Maya; Riviera Maya, Mexico
November 25, 2026*; TBD, Triple Crown Sports Network		vs. TBD; Cancún Challenge Mayan Division						Hard Rock Hotel Riviera Maya; Riviera Maya, Mexico
November 29, 2026*; 1:00 p.m., ESPN+		at Green Bay						Resch Center; Green Bay, WI
December 1, 2026*; 7:00 p.m., SLN		Waldorf						Betty Engelstad Sioux Center; Grand Forks, ND
December 5, 2026*; 3:00 p.m., MW+		at UTEP; Cancún Challenge campus game						Don Haskins Center; El Paso, TX
December 9, 2026*; 6:00 p.m., ESPN+		at SIUE						Vadalabene Center; Edwardsville, IL
December 12, 2026*; 9:00 p.m., ESPN+		at CSUN						Premier America Credit Union Arena; Northridge, CA
December 17, 2026*; 7:00 p.m., Midco Sports/SLN		Green Bay						Betty Engelstad Sioux Center; Grand Forks, ND
December 20, 2026*; 5:00 p.m., ESPN+		at Montana State						Brick Breeden Fieldhouse; Bozeman, MT
December 22, 2026*; 8:00 p.m., ESPN+		at Colorado						CU Events Center; Boulder, CO
December 30, 2026*; 8:00 p.m., SLN		Minnesota Morris						Betty Engelstad Sioux Center; Grand Forks, ND
January 2, 2027*; 7:00 p.m., MW+		at UNLV						Thomas & Mack Center; Las Vegas, NV
Summit League regular season
January 7, 2027; 7:00 p.m., SLN		at Omaha						Baxter Arena; Omaha, NE
January 10, 2027; 1:00 p.m., SLN		at St. Thomas						Lee & Penny Anderson Arena; St. Paul, MN
January 14, 2027; 7:00 p.m., Midco Sports/SLN		Oral Roberts						Betty Engelstad Sioux Center; Grand Forks, ND
January 16, 2027; 1:00 p.m., Midco Sports/SLN		Kansas City						Betty Engelstad Sioux Center; Grand Forks, ND
January 21, 2027; 7:00 p.m., SLN		at South Dakota						Sanford Coyote Sports Center; Vermillion, SD
January 23, 2027; 2:00 p.m., SLN		at South Dakota State						First Bank & Trust Arena; Brookings, SD
January 29, 2027; 8:00 p.m., CBSSN		North Dakota State						Betty Engelstad Sioux Center; Grand Forks, ND
February 4, 2027; 7:00 p.m., Midco Sports/SLN		St. Thomas						Betty Engelstad Sioux Center; Grand Forks, ND
February 6, 2027; 1:00 p.m., Midco Sports/SLN		Omaha						Betty Engelstad Sioux Center; Grand Forks, ND
February 11, 2027; 7:00 p.m., SLN		at Kansas City						Swinney Recreation Center; Kansas City, MO
February 13, 2027; 7:00 p.m., SLN		at Oral Roberts						Mabee Center; Tulsa, OK
February 18, 2027; 7:00 p.m., Midco Sports/SLN		South Dakota State						Betty Engelstad Sioux Center; Grand Forks, ND
February 20, 2027; 1:00 p.m., Midco Sports/SLN		South Dakota						Betty Engelstad Sioux Center; Grand Forks, ND
February 27, 2027; 7:00 p.m., SLN		at North Dakota State						Scheels Center; Fargo, ND
Summit League tournament
March 4–7, 2027*; TBA, SLN/CBSSN		vs. Summit League tournament						Denny Sanford Premier Center; Sioux Falls, SD
*Non-conference game. ^{#}Rankings from AP poll. (#) Tournament seedings in parentheses. All times are in Central.
