= 2026–27 North Dakota State Bison men's basketball team =

American college basketball season

2026–27 North Dakota State Bison men's basketball
- Conference: Summit League
- Record: 2–5 (0–0 Summit)
- Head coach: David Richman (13th season)
- Associate head coach: Luke Strege
- Assistant coaches: Spencer Wilker; Terrance McGee; Camron Greer
- Home arena: Scheels Center

2026–27 Summit League men's basketball standings
| | Conf. | | | | Overall |
| Team | W | | L | PCT | W | | L | PCT |
|---|---|---|---|---|---|---|---|---|
| South Dakota State | 0 | – | 0 | – | 5 | – | 0 | 1.000 |
| Kansas City | 0 | – | 0 | – | 3 | – | 3 | .500 |
| Omaha | 0 | – | 0 | – | 3 | – | 3 | .500 |
| St. Thomas | 0 | – | 0 | – | 3 | – | 3 | .500 |
| North Dakota | 0 | – | 0 | – | 2 | – | 3 | .400 |
| Oral Roberts | 0 | – | 0 | – | 2 | – | 3 | .400 |
| North Dakota State | 0 | – | 0 | – | 2 | – | 5 | .286 |
| South Dakota | 0 | – | 0 | – | 2 | – | 5 | .286 |
† 2027 Summit League tournament winner As of November 20, 2026; Rankings from AP poll

The 2026–27 North Dakota State Bison men's basketball team represents North Dakota State University during the 2026–27 NCAA Division I men's basketball season. The Bison, who are led by 13th-year head coach David Richman, play their home games at the Scheels Center, as members of the Summit League.

== Previous season ==
The Bison finished the 2025–26 season 24–7, 14–2 in Summit League play to win the regular season title. In the Summit League tournament, they defeated Oral Roberts in the quarterfinal, Omaha in the semifinal, and North Dakota in the final to win their sixth tournament title. In the 2026 NCAA Division I men's basketball tournament, the Bison were defeated by Michigan State in the first round.

== Offseason ==
=== Departures ===
| Name | Number | Pos. | Height | Weight | Year | Hometown | Reason for departure |
|---|---|---|---|---|---|---|---|
| Trevian Carson | 0 | G | 6'4" | 200 | 3rd | West Des Moines, IA | Transferred to Cincinnati |
| Damari Wheeler-Thomas | 1 | G | 6'0" | 190 | 3rd | Elgin, IL | Transferred to Boise State |
| Tay Smith | 3 | G | 6'3" | 190 | 4th | O'Fallon, IL | Graduated |
| Emil Skyttä | 8 | G | 6'5" | 195 | 3rd | Helsinki, Finland | Transferred to Portland State |
| Max Majerle | 11 | G | 6'4" | 195 | 3rd | Scottsdale, AZ | Unknown |
| Riley Saunders | 13 | G | 6'0" | 180 | 1st | Sandy Springs, GA | Unknown |
| Dom Clay | 14 | G | 6'4" | 175 | 1st | Quincy, IL | Transferred to Lindenwood |
| Caleb Schoenrock | 22 | F | 6'7" | 200 | 2nd | St. Francis, MN | Unknown |
| Markhi Strickland | 30 | G | 6'6" | 210 | 5th | Miami, FL | Graduated |
| Noah Feddersen | 34 | F | 6'10" | 250 | 3rd | Menomonie, WI | Transferred to Colorado |
| Treyson Anderson | 44 | F | 6'9" | 240 | 2nd | Lincoln, NE | Transferred to Butler |

=== Incoming transfers ===
| Name | Number | Pos. | Height | Weight | Year | Hometown | Previous School |
|---|---|---|---|---|---|---|---|
| Rob Diaz III | 0 | G | 6'1" | 190 | 4th | Long Beach, CA | Long Beach State |
| Melvin Bell Jr. | 1 | G | 6'4" | 195 | 2nd | Chicago, IL | San Jose State |
| Kaden Tate | 3 | F | 6'6" | 220 | 3rd | Pearland, TX | Des Moines Area CC |
| Jack Robison | 11 | G | 6'6" | 200 | 3rd | Lakeville, MN | Wisconsin |
| Jaziah Harper | 14 | G | 6'7" | 200 | 2nd | Oak Park, IL | Maryland |
| Karl Poom | 23 | F | 6'8" | 230 | 3rd | Tartu, Estonia | Northern Arizona |
| Santiago Paz Vazquez | 30 | G | 6'7" | 200 | 4th | Santiago de Compostela, Spain | None |
| Andrew Nagy | 44 | F | 6'9" | 230 | 3rd | Anaheim, CA | Point Loma |

=== 2026 recruiting class ===
College recruiting
| Name | Hometown | School | Height | Weight | Commit date |
|---|---|---|---|---|---|
| Max Iversen; G | Loretto, Minnesota | Maple Grove Senior High School | 6 ft 3 in (1.91 m) | 175 lb (79 kg) | May 19, 2026 |
| Max Iversen; G | Recruit ratings: Scout: Rivals: 247Sports: ESPN: (0) | | | | |
| Chance Schoenfeld; F | Astoria, South Dakota | Deubrook High School | 6 ft 8 in (2.03 m) | 200 lb (91 kg) | Jul 27, 2025 |
| Chance Schoenfeld; F | Recruit ratings: Scout: Rivals: 247Sports: ESPN: (0) | | | | |
| Amir Danforth; G | Rockford, Illinois | Rockford Auburn High School | 6 ft 0 in (1.83 m) | 175 lb (79 kg) | Nov 12, 2025 |
| Amir Danforth; G | Recruit ratings: Scout: Rivals: 247Sports: ESPN: (0) | | | | |
| Oliver Junker; F | Littleton, Colorado | Mountain Vista High School | 6 ft 8 in (2.03 m) | 220 lb (100 kg) | Nov 12, 2025 |
| Oliver Junker; F | Recruit ratings: Scout: Rivals: 247Sports: ESPN: (0) | | | | |
| Colin Stack; F | St. Charles, Illinois | Benet Academy | 7 ft 0 in (2.13 m) | 225 lb (102 kg) | Nov 9, 2025 |
| Colin Stack; F | Recruit ratings: Scout: Rivals: 247Sports: ESPN: (0) | | | | |
Overall recruit ranking:
Note: In many cases, Scout, Rivals, 247Sports, On3, and ESPN may conflict in their listings of height and weight.; In these cases, the average was taken. ESPN grades are on a 100-point scale.; Sources: "2026 Team Ranking". Rivals.

== Roster ==
2026–27 North Dakota State Bison men's basketball team
Players
Coaches

| Pos. | # | Name | Height | Weight | Year | Previous school | Hometown |
|---|---|---|---|---|---|---|---|
| G | 0 | Rob Diaz III | 6 ft 1 in (1.85 m) | 190 lb (86 kg) | Sr | Long Beach State | Long Beach, CA |
| G | 1 | Melvin Bell Jr. | 6 ft 4 in (1.93 m) | 195 lb (88 kg) | So | San Jose State | Chicago, IL |
| G | 2 | Riley Massey | 6 ft 3 in (1.91 m) | 185 lb (84 kg) | So | De Smet Jesuit High School | Shiloh, IL |
| F | 3 | Kaden Tate | 6 ft 6 in (1.98 m) | 220 lb (100 kg) | Jr | Des Moines Area Community College | Pearland, TX |
| G | 4 | Max Iversen | 6 ft 3 in (1.91 m) | 175 lb (79 kg) | Fr | Maple Grove Senior High School | Loretto, MN |
| G | 5 | Andy Stefonowicz (injured) | 6 ft 2 in (1.88 m) | 170 lb (77 kg) | Jr | Minnetonka High School | Minnetonka, MN |
| G | 7 | Carson Smith | 6 ft 6 in (1.98 m) | 205 lb (93 kg) | Jr | Bountiful High School | Bountiful, UT |
| G | 11 | Jack Robison | 6 ft 6 in (1.98 m) | 200 lb (91 kg) | Jr | Wisconsin | Lakeville, MN |
| F | 12 | Chance Schoenfeld | 6 ft 8 in (2.03 m) | 200 lb (91 kg) | Fr | Deubrook High School | Astoria, SD |
| G | 13 | Amir Danforth | 6 ft 0 in (1.83 m) | 175 lb (79 kg) | Fr | Rockford Auburn High School | Rockford, IL |
| G | 14 | Jaziah Harper | 6 ft 7 in (2.01 m) | 200 lb (91 kg) | So | Maryland | Oak Park, IL |
| F | 22 | Oliver Junker | 6 ft 8 in (2.03 m) | 220 lb (100 kg) | Fr | Mountain Vista High School | Littleton, CO |
| F | 23 | Karl Poom | 6 ft 8 in (2.03 m) | 230 lb (104 kg) | Jr | Northern Arizona | Tartu, Estonia |
| G | 30 | Santiago Paz Vazquez | 6 ft 7 in (2.01 m) | 200 lb (91 kg) | Sr | — | Santiago de Compostela, Spain |
| F | 35 | Colin Stack | 7 ft 0 in (2.13 m) | 225 lb (102 kg) | Fr | Benet Academy | St. Charles, IL |
| F | 44 | Andrew Nagy | 6 ft 9 in (2.06 m) | 230 lb (104 kg) | Jr | Point Loma | Anaheim, CA |

Head coach

- David Richman (North Dakota State)

Assistant coach(es)

- Luke Strege (Wisconsin-La Crosse)
- Spencer Wilker (North Dakota State)
- Terrance McGee (Missouri State)
- Camron Greer (North Dakota State)

Legend

- (C) Team captain
- (S) Suspended
- (I) Ineligible
- (W) Walk-on
- Injured
- Current redshirt

Roster

== Schedule and results ==
| Date time, TV | Rank^{#} | Opponent^{#} | Result | Record | High points | High rebounds | High assists | Site (attendance) city, state |
Exhibition
| October 22, 2026*; 7:00 p.m., WDAY Xtra/Summit League Network | | Minnesota State–Moorhead | W 80–74 | — | 23 – Diaz III | 10 – Bell Jr. | 2 – Diaz III | Scheels Center (1,222); Fargo, ND |
Non–conference regular season
| November 2, 2026*; 7:00 p.m., WDAY Xtra/SLN | | Minnesota–Crookston | W 90–59 | 1–0 | 18 – Stefonowicz | 6 – Tied (2) | 7 – Stefonowicz | Scheels Center (841); Fargo, ND |
| November 4, 2026*; 9:00 p.m., ESPN+ | | at Saint Mary's | L 64–105 | 1–1 | 15 – Poom | 4 – Tied (3) | 4 – Massey | University Credit Union Pavilion (2,701); Moraga, CA |
| November 6, 2026*; 9:00 p.m., ESPN+ | | at San Francisco | L 70–79 | 1–2 | 18 – Diaz III | 7 – Tate | 5 – Stefonowicz | Sobrato Center (995); San Francisco, CA |
| November 8, 2026*; 5:00 p.m., ESPN+ | | at Cal State Bakersfield | L 80–91 | 1–3 | 20 – Iverson | 7 – Tate | 6 – Massey | Icardo Center (1,506); Bakersfield, CA |
| November 13, 2026*; 7:00 p.m., WDAY Xtra/SLN | | Illinois State | W 82–81 ^{OT} | 2–3 | 27 – Iversen | 7 – Poom | 4 – Iversen | Scheels Center (1,985); Fargo, ND |
| November 15, 2026*; 1:00 p.m., WDAY Xtra/SLN | | Cal State Bakersfield | L 69–73 | 2–4 | 16 – Diaz III | 9 – Diaz III | 3 – Diaz III | Scheels Center (760); Fargo, ND |
| November 18, 2026*; 8:00 p.m., YouTube | | at Colorado State | L 64–71 | 2–5 | 20 – Iversen | 9 – Iversen | 5 – Diaz III | Moby Arena (4,114); Fort Collins, CO |
| November 23, 2026*; 7:00 p.m., WDAY Xtra/SLN | | Wisconsin–Stout | | | | | | Scheels Center; Fargo, ND |
| November 27, 2026*; 8:30 p.m., YouTube | | vs. North Texas; Snake River Invitational | | | | | | Mountain America Center; Idaho Falls, ID |
| November 28, 2026*; 5:00 p.m., YouTube | | vs. Drake; Snake River Invitational | | | | | | Mountain America Center; Idaho Falls, ID |
| November 29, 2026*; 3:00 p.m., The CW | | vs. Boise State; Snake River Invitational | | | | | | Mountain America Center; Idaho Falls, ID |
| December 3, 2026*; 7:00 p.m., WDAY Xtra/SLN | | UC Davis | | | | | | Scheels Center; Fargo, ND |
| December 6, 2026*; 3:00 p.m., The CW | | at Washington State | | | | | | Beasley Coliseum; Pullman, WA |
| December 8, 2026*; 7:00 p.m., ESPN+ | | at Idaho | | | | | | ICCU Arena; Moscow, ID |
| December 13, 2026*; 4:00 p.m., ESPN+ | | at Illinois State | | | | | | CEFCU Arena; Normal, IL |
| December 20, 2026*; 1:00 p.m., WDAY Xtra/SLN | | Idaho State | | | | | | Scheels Center; Fargo, ND |
| December 22, 2026*; 9:00 p.m., ESPN+ | | at Cal State Northridge | | | | | | Premier America Credit Union Arena; Northridge, CA |
| December 31, 2026*; 1:00 p.m., WDAY Xtra/SLN | | Concordia–Nebraska | | | | | | Scheels Center; Fargo, ND |
Summit League regular season
| January 7, 2027; 7:00 p.m., CBSSN | | at St. Thomas | | | | | | Lee and Penny Anderson Arena; St. Paul, MN |
| January 9, 2027; 1:00 p.m., SLN | | at Omaha | | | | | | Baxter Arena; Omaha, NE |
| January 14, 2027; 7:00 p.m., WDAY Xtra/SLN | | Kansas City | | | | | | Scheels Center; Fargo, ND |
| January 16, 2027; 1:00 p.m., WDAY Xtra/SLN | | Oral Roberts | | | | | | Scheels Center; Fargo, ND |
| January 21, 2027; 7:00 p.m., SLN | | at South Dakota State | | | | | | First Bank and Trust Arena; Brookings, SD |
| January 23, 2027; 1:00 p.m., SLN | | at South Dakota | | | | | | Sanford Coyote Sports Center; Vermillion, SD |
| January 29, 2027; 8:00 p.m., CBSSN | | at North Dakota | | | | | | Betty Engelstad Sioux Center; Grand Forks, ND |
| February 4, 2027; 7:00 p.m., WDAY Xtra/SLN | | Omaha | | | | | | Scheels Center; Fargo, ND |
| February 6, 2027; 1:00 p.m., WDAY Xtra/SLN | | St. Thomas | | | | | | Scheels Center; Fargo, ND |
| February 11, 2027; 7:00 p.m., SLN | | at Oral Roberts | | | | | | Mabee Center; Tulsa, OK |
| February 13, 2027; 2:00 p.m., SLN | | at Kansas City | | | | | | Swinney Recreation Center; Kansas City, MO |
| February 18, 2027; 7:00 p.m., WDAY Xtra/SLN | | South Dakota | | | | | | Scheels Center; Fargo, ND |
| February 20, 2027; 1:00 p.m., WDAY Xtra/SLN | | South Dakota State | | | | | | Scheels Center; Fargo, ND |
| February 27, 2027; 7:00 p.m., WDAY Xtra/SLN | | North Dakota | | | | | | Scheels Center; Fargo, ND |
Summit League tournament
| March 4–7, 2027*; TBA, CBSSN/SLN | | vs. Summit League tournament | | | | | | Denny Sanford Premier Center; Sioux Falls, SD |
*Non-conference game. ^{#}Rankings from AP Poll. (#) Tournament seedings in parentheses. All times are in Central.
