= 2026–27 Omaha Mavericks men's basketball team =

American college basketball season

2026–27 Omaha Mavericks men's basketball
- Conference: Summit League
- Record: 2–2 (0–0 Summit)
- Head coach: Chris Crutchfield (5th season)
- Assistant coaches: Kyan Brown; Keenan Holdman; J.R. Reynolds
- Home arena: Baxter Arena

2026–27 Summit League men's basketball standings
	Conf.				Overall
Team	W		L	PCT	W		L	PCT
South Dakota State	0	–	0	–	5	–	0	1.000
Kansas City	0	–	0	–	3	–	3	.500
Omaha	0	–	0	–	3	–	3	.500
St. Thomas	0	–	0	–	3	–	3	.500
North Dakota	0	–	0	–	2	–	3	.400
Oral Roberts	0	–	0	–	2	–	3	.400
North Dakota State	0	–	0	–	2	–	5	.286
South Dakota	0	–	0	–	2	–	5	.286
† 2027 Summit League tournament winner As of November 19, 2026; Rankings from AP poll

The 2026–27 Omaha Mavericks men's basketball team will represent the University of Nebraska Omaha in the 2026–27 NCAA Division I men's basketball season. The Mavericks, who will be led by fifth-year head coach Chris Crutchfield, play their home games at Baxter Arena in Omaha, Nebraska as members of the Summit League.

== Previous season ==
The Mavericks finished the 2025–26 season 16–17, 8–8 in Summit League play to finish in fifth place. In the Summit League tournament, the Mavericks defeated South Dakota in the quarterfinals, before falling to North Dakota State in the semifinals.

== Roster ==
2026–27 Omaha Mavericks men's basketball team
Players
Coaches

Pos.	#	Name	Height	Weight	Year	Previous school	Hometown
F	0	Chris Dockery	6 ft 6 in (1.98 m)	200 lb (91 kg)	Sr	Kansas City	Las Vegas, NV
G	1	Cory Curtis Jr.	6 ft 4 in (1.93 m)	—	GS	Kansas City	Los Angeles, CA
G	2	Cahmai Crosby	6 ft 4 in (1.93 m)	200 lb (91 kg)	Sr	North Texas	Kansas City, KS
G	3	Grant Stubblefield	6 ft 1 in (1.85 m)	190 lb (86 kg)	Sr	Blue Valley Northwest High School	Overland Park, KS
F	5	Dace Pleasant	6 ft 6 in (1.98 m)	195 lb (88 kg)	Jr	Howard	Federal Way, WA
F	7	Justin Bolis	6 ft 8 in (2.03 m)	225 lb (102 kg)	Sr	Nebraska	Lincoln, NE
F	8	Ethan Sheats	6 ft 8 in (2.03 m)	195 lb (88 kg)	Fr	Denton High School	Denton, TX
G	11	Jonny Jordan Jr.	6 ft 3 in (1.91 m)	175 lb (79 kg)	Fr	Chaminade College Preparatory School	St. Louis, MO
G	12	Aidan Skradis	6 ft 4 in (1.93 m)	185 lb (84 kg)	Jr	Elkhorn South High School	Elkhorn, NE
G	13	Brandon Orgilbold	6 ft 0 in (1.83 m)	200 lb (91 kg)	Sr	Doane	Elkhorn, NE
G	21	Deke Thompson	6 ft 5 in (1.96 m)	205 lb (93 kg)	So	Texas State	Jenks, OK
C	24	Isaac Ondekane	6 ft 8 in (2.03 m)	250 lb (113 kg)	GS	Lindenwood	Kinshasa, Congo
C	32	Heri Bukinga	6 ft 11 in (2.11 m)	225 lb (102 kg)	So	Drake	Goma, Congo
F	42	Gavin Baker	6 ft 7 in (2.01 m)	205 lb (93 kg)	Fr	Bergen Catholic High School	Fremont, NE
F	44	Brock Scholl	6 ft 8 in (2.03 m)	220 lb (100 kg)	So	Skutt Catholic High School	Omaha, NE

Head coach

- Chris Crutchfield (Omaha)

Assistant coach(es)

- Kyan Brown (Oral Roberts)
- J. R. Reynolds (Virginia)
- Keenan Holdman (Hardin–Simmons)

Legend

- (C) Team captain
- (S) Suspended
- (I) Ineligible
- (W) Walk-on
- Injured
- Current redshirt

Roster
Last update: October 25, 2026

== Schedule and results ==
Date time, TV	Rank^{#}	Opponent^{#}	Result	Record	Site (attendance) city, state
Exhibition
October 15, 2026*; 7:00 p.m.		at Minnesota	L 52–72	–	The Barn (7,269); Minneapolis, MN
Non–conference regular season
November 2, 2026*; 7:00 p.m., Summit League Network		Mid-American Christian	W 73–65	1–0	Baxter Arena (1,452); Omaha, NE
November 6, 2026*; 8:00 p.m., ESPN+		at No. 25 BYU	L 67–108	1–1	Marriott Center (16,190); Provo, UT
November 7, 2026*; 3:00 p.m., YouTube		at Utah State	L 56-90	1-2	Dee Glen Smith Spectrum; Logan, UT
November 10, 2026*; 7:00 p.m., SLN		York (NE)	W 78–66	2–2	Baxter Arena; Omaha, NE
November 13, 2026*; 7:45 p.m., SLN		Lindenwood	W 67–56	3–2	Baxter Arena (2,903); Omaha, NE
November 17, 2026*; 7:00 p.m., SLN		Lamar	L 74–104	3–3	Baxter Arena (2,017); Omaha, NE
November 25, 2026*; 7:30 p.m., FloSports		vs. UC Davis; Las Vegas Resort World Invitational			Resorts World Event Center; Las Vegas, NV
November 26, 2026*; 9:30 p.m., FloSports		vs. Pacific; Las Vegas Resort World Invitational			Resorts World Event Center; Las Vegas, NV
November 27, 2026*; 9:30 p.m., FloSports		vs. Jacksonville State; Las Vegas Resort World Invitational			Resorts World Event Center; Las Vegas, NV
December 1, 2026*; 7:00 p.m., SLN		Mount Marty			Baxter Arena; Omaha, NE
December 5, 2026*; 1:00 p.m., SLN		at Lindenwood			Robert F. Hyland Arena; St. Charles, MO
December 8, 2026*; 6:30 p.m., ESPN+		at Texas Tech			United Supermarkets Arena; Lubbock, TX
December 15, 2026*; 7:45 p.m., SLN		Sam Houston			Baxter Arena; Omaha, NE
December 20, 2026*; 6:00 p.m., TBA		vs. Kent State; WestStar Don Haskins Sun Bowl Invitational			Don Haskins Center; El Paso, TX
December 21, 2026*; TBA, TBA		vs. Howard/UTEP; WestStar Don Haskins Sun Bowl Invitational			Don Haskins Center; El Paso, TX
December 29, 2026*; 7:00 p.m., ESPN+		at Kansas State			Bramlage Coliseum; Manhattan, KS
December 31, 2026*; 1:00 p.m., SLN		Park (AZ)			Baxter Arena; Omaha, NE
Summit League regular season
January 7, 2027; 7:00 p.m., SLN		North Dakota			Baxter Arena; Omaha, NE
January 9, 2027; 1:00 p.m., SLN		North Dakota State			Baxter Arena; Omaha, NE
January 16, 2027; 6:00 p.m., SLN		at St. Thomas			Lee & Penny Anderson Arena; St. Paul, MN
January 21, 2027; 7:00 p.m., SLN		at Kansas City			Municipal Auditorium; Kansas City, MO
January 23, 2027; 7:00 p.m., SLN		at Oral Roberts			Mabee Center; Tulsa, OK
January 28, 2027; 7:00 p.m., SLN		South Dakota			Baxter Arena; Omaha, NE
January 31, 2027; 1:00 p.m., CBSSN		South Dakota State			Baxter Arena; Omaha, NE
February 4, 2027; 7:00 p.m., SLN		at North Dakota State			Scheels Center; Fargo, ND
February 6, 2027; 1:00 p.m., SLN		at North Dakota			Betty Engelstad Sioux Center; Grand Forks, ND
February 13, 2027; 7:00 p.m., SLN		St. Thomas			Baxter Arena; Omaha, NE
February 18, 2027; 7:00 p.m., SLN		Oral Roberts			Baxter Arena; Omaha, NE
February 21, 2027; 1:00 p.m., CBSSN		Kansas City			Baxter Arena; Omaha, NE
February 25, 2027; 7:00 p.m., SLN		at South Dakota State			First Bank and Trust Arena; Brookings, SD
February 27, 2027; TBA, SLN		at South Dakota			Sanford Coyote Sports Center; Vermillion, SD
Summit League tournament
March 4–7, 2027*; TBA, SLN/CBSSN		vs. Summit League tournament			Denny Sanford Premier Center; Sioux Falls, SD
*Non-conference game. ^{#}Rankings from AP poll. (#) Tournament seedings in parentheses. All times are in Central.
