= 2026–27 St. Thomas Tommies (Minnesota) men's basketball team =

American college basketball season

2026–27 St. Thomas (Minnesota) Tommies men's basketball
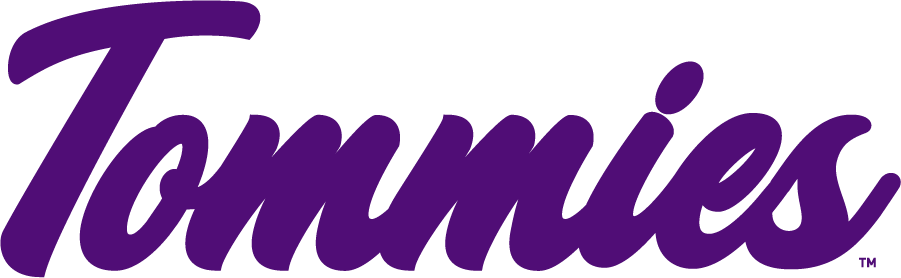
- Conference: Summit League
- Record: 5–3 (0–0 Summit)
- Head coach: John Tauer (16th season)
- Associate head coach: Mike Maker
- Assistant coaches: Cameron Rundles; Riley Miller
- Home arena: Lee & Penny Anderson Arena

2026–27 Summit League men's basketball standings
| | Conf. | | | | Overall |
| Team | W | | L | PCT | W | | L | PCT |
|---|---|---|---|---|---|---|---|---|
| South Dakota State | 0 | – | 0 | – | 5 | – | 1 | .833 |
| St. Thomas | 0 | – | 0 | – | 4 | – | 3 | .571 |
| North Dakota | 0 | – | 0 | – | 3 | – | 3 | .500 |
| Omaha | 0 | – | 0 | – | 3 | – | 3 | .500 |
| Kansas City | 0 | – | 0 | – | 3 | – | 4 | .429 |
| Oral Roberts | 0 | – | 0 | – | 2 | – | 3 | .400 |
| North Dakota State | 0 | – | 0 | – | 2 | – | 5 | .286 |
| South Dakota | 0 | – | 0 | – | 2 | – | 5 | .286 |
† 2027 Summit League tournament winner As of November 22, 2026; Rankings from AP poll

The 2026–27 St. Thomas Tommies men's basketball team will represent the University of St. Thomas during the 2026–27 NCAA Division I men's basketball season. The Tommies will be led by 16th-year head coach John Tauer, play home games at Lee & Penny Anderson Arena in Saint Paul, Minnesota, as members of the Summit League.

== Previous season ==
The Tommies finished the 2025–26 season 24–10, 12–4 in Summit League play to finish in second place. In the Summit League tournament; the Tommies defeated South Dakota State in the quarterfinals, but fell to North Dakota in the semifinals.

== Roster ==
2026–27 St. Thomas (Minnesota) Tommies men's basketball team
Players
Coaches

| Pos. | # | Name | Height | Weight | Year | Previous school | Hometown |
|---|---|---|---|---|---|---|---|
| G | 0 | Brogan Madson | 6 ft 1 in (1.85 m) | 190 lb (86 kg) | So | Mankato East High School | Mankato, MN |
| G | 1 | Hayden Tibbits | 5 ft 11 in (1.8 m) | 160 lb (73 kg) | RS Jr | Wayzata High School | Medina, MN |
| G | 2 | Austin Herro | 6 ft 3 in (1.91 m) | 180 lb (82 kg) | RS Jr | Whitnall High School | Milwaukee, WI |
| G | 3 | JoJo Mitchell III | 6 ft 2 in (1.88 m) | 185 lb (84 kg) | Fr | Cretin-Derham Hall High School | Minneapolis, MN |
| G | 4 | Kendall Blue | 6 ft 6 in (1.98 m) | 200 lb (91 kg) | GS | East Ridge High School | Woodbury, MN |
| G | 5 | Tim Franks | 6 ft 5 in (1.96 m) | 190 lb (86 kg) | RS So | Homestead High School | Mequon, WI |
| G | 10 | Tommy Humphries Jr. | 6 ft 5 in (1.96 m) | 205 lb (93 kg) | RS Jr | Totino-Grace High School | Minneapolis, MN |
| G | 11 | Julius Wade | 6 ft 6 in (1.98 m) | 170 lb (77 kg) | So | American Canyon High School | Oakland, CA |
| F | 13 | Luka Momcilovic | 6 ft 8 in (2.03 m) | 220 lb (100 kg) | RS Fr | Pewaukee High School | Pewaukee, WI |
| G | 15 | Adam Tauer | 6 ft 3 in (1.91 m) | 185 lb (84 kg) | RS Jr | Cretin-Derham Hall High School | St. Paul, MN |
| F | 21 | Caden Wilkins | 6 ft 7 in (2.01 m) | 230 lb (104 kg) | RS So | Bettendorf High School | Bettendorf, IA |
| G | 22 | Jonovan Wilkinson | 6 ft 2 in (1.88 m) | 200 lb (91 kg) | Jr | Roland–Story High School | Radcliffe, IA |
| F | 24 | Kyle Counts | 6 ft 7 in (2.01 m) | 210 lb (95 kg) | RS So | Wilsonville High School | Wilsonville, OR |
| F | 32 | Carter Bjerke | 6 ft 9 in (2.06 m) | 255 lb (116 kg) | GS | Wayzata High School | Plymouth, MN |
| F | 33 | Jeremy Lorenz | 6 ft 8 in (2.03 m) | 230 lb (104 kg) | RS Jr | Brillion High School | Brillion, WI |

Head coach

- John Tauer (St. Thomas (MN))

Assistant coach(es)

- Mike Maker (Cal Baptist)
- Cameron Rundles (Wofford)
- Riley Miller (St. Thomas (MN))

Legend

- (C) Team captain
- (S) Suspended
- (I) Ineligible
- (W) Walk-on
- Injured
- Current redshirt

Roster
Last update: October 21, 2026

== Schedule and results ==
| Date time, TV | Rank^{#} | Opponent^{#} | Result | Record | High points | High rebounds | High assists | Site (attendance) city, state |
Non–conference regular season
| November 2, 2026*; 6:00 p.m., ESPN+ | | at Presbyterian | W 87–78 | 1–0 | 24 – Franks | 6 – Franks | 5 – Tibbits | Templeton Physical Education Center (563); Clinton, SC |
| November 6, 2026*; 7:00 p.m., Peacock | | at Minnesota | L 62–74 | 1–1 | 13 – Lorenz | 6 – Wilkins | 5 – Herro | Williams Arena (10,604); Minneapolis, MN |
| November 8, 2026*; 1:00 p.m., Summit League Network | | Green Bay | L 67–76 | 1–2 | 20 – Lorenz | 8 – Lorenz | 4 – Tibbits | Lee & Penny Anderson Arena (1,620); St. Paul, MN |
| November 11, 2026*; 7:00 p.m., SLN | | Macalester | W 119–82 | 2–2 | 23 – Madson | 8 – Bjerke | 5 – Tibbits | Lee & Penny Anderson Arena (1,553); St. Paul, MN |
| November 14, 2026*; 12:00 p.m., ESPN+ | | at Army | L 77-79 | 2-3 | 21 – Tibbits | 8 – Lorenz | 6 – Tibbits | Christl Arena (2,961); West Point, NY |
| November 16, 2026*; 6:00 p.m., NEC Front Row | | at LIU | W 79-70 | 3-3 | 17 – Tibbits | 5 – Tied (2) | 3 – Tied (2) | Steinberg Wellness Center (321); Brooklyn, NY |
| November 19, 2026*; 7:00 p.m., SLN | | Southeast Missouri State | W 93-61 | 4-3 | 17 – Lorenz | 7 – Lorenz | 4 – Tied (3) | Lee & Penny Anderson Arena (1,377); St. Paul, MN |
| November 21, 2026*; 2:00 p.m., ESPN+ | | at Milwaukee | W 98-70 | 5-3 | 25 – Lorenz | 10 – Lorenz | 5 – Tied (2) | UW–Milwaukee Panther Arena (1,993); Milwaukee, WI |
| November 25, 2026*; 6:00 p.m., FloSports | | at UNC Wilmington; Live Oak Bank Holiday Classic | | | | | | Trask Coliseum; Wilmington, NC |
| November 27, 2026*; 11:00 a.m., TBD | | vs. Liberty; Live Oak Bank Holiday Classic | | | | | | Trask Coliseum; Wilmington, NC |
| November 28, 2026*; 11:00 a.m., TBD | | vs. Princeton; Live Oak Bank Holiday Classic | | | | | | Trask Coliseum; Wilmington, NC |
| December 3, 2026*; 7:00 p.m., SLN | | North Central (MN) | | | | | | Lee & Penny Anderson Arena; St. Paul, MN |
| December 5, 2026*; 1:00 p.m., ESPN+ | | at Bucknell | | | | | | Sojka Pavilion; Lewisburg, PA |
| December 10, 2026*; 7:00 p.m., SLN | | UNC Asheville | | | | | | Lee & Penny Anderson Arena; St. Paul, MN |
| December 12, 2026*; 2:00 p.m., SLN | | Arkansas State | | | | | | Lee & Penny Anderson Arena; St. Paul, MN |
| December 15, 2026*; 7:00 p.m., SLN | | UC San Diego | | | | | | Lee & Penny Anderson Arena; St. Paul, MN |
| December 22, 2026*; 7:00 p.m., ESPN+ | | at Stanford | | | | | | Maples Pavilion; Stanford, CA |
| January 2, 2027*; 2:00 p.m., SLN | | St. Olaf | | | | | | Lee & Penny Anderson Arena; St. Paul, MN |
Summit League regular season
| January 7, 2027; 7:00 p.m., CBSSN | | North Dakota State | | | | | | Lee & Penny Anderson Arena; St. Paul, MN |
| January 10, 2027; 1:00 p.m., SLN | | North Dakota | | | | | | Lee & Penny Anderson Arena; St. Paul, MN |
| January 16, 2027; 6:00 p.m., SLN | | Omaha | | | | | | Lee & Penny Anderson Arena; St. Paul, MN |
| January 21, 2027; 7:00 p.m., SLN | | at Oral Roberts | | | | | | Mabee Center; Tulsa, OK |
| January 23, 2027; 7:00 p.m., SLN | | at Kansas City | | | | | | Municipal Auditorium; Kansas City, MO |
| January 28, 2027; 7:00 p.m., SLN | | South Dakota State | | | | | | Lee & Penny Anderson Arena; St. Paul, MN |
| January 30, 2027; 6:00 p.m., SLN | | South Dakota | | | | | | Lee & Penny Anderson Arena; St. Paul, MN |
| February 4, 2027; 7:00 p.m., SLN | | at North Dakota | | | | | | Alerus Center; Grand Forks, ND |
| February 6, 2027; 1:00 p.m., SLN | | at North Dakota State | | | | | | Scheels Center; Fargo, ND |
| February 13, 2027; 7:00 p.m., SLN | | at Omaha | | | | | | Baxter Arena; Omaha, NE |
| February 18, 2027; 7:00 p.m., SLN | | Kansas City | | | | | | Lee & Penny Anderson Arena; St. Paul, MN |
| February 21, 2027; 3:00 p.m., CBSSN | | Oral Roberts | | | | | | Lee & Penny Anderson Arena; St. Paul, MN |
| February 25, 2027; 7:00 p.m., SLN | | at South Dakota | | | | | | Sanford Coyote Sports Center; Vermillion, SD |
| February 27, 2027; 2:00 p.m., SLN | | at South Dakota State | | | | | | First Bank and Trust Arena; Brookings, SD |
Summit League tournament
| March 4–7, 2027; TBA, SLN/CBSSN | | vs. Summit League tournament | | | | | | Denny Sanford Premier Center; Sioux Falls, SD |
*Non-conference game. ^{#}Rankings from AP poll. (#) Tournament seedings in parentheses. All times are in Central.
