= Mark Turgeon =

American college basketball coach (born 1965)

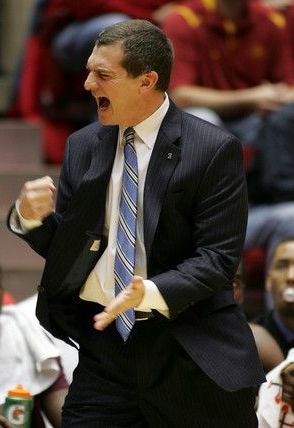
- Turgeon coaching Texas A&M in 2010

Current position
- Title: Head coach
- Team: Kansas City
- Conference: Summit League
- Record: 2–3

Biographical details
- Born: February 5, 1965 (age 61); Topeka, Kansas, U.S.A.

Playing career
- 1983–1987: Kansas
- Position: Point guard

Coaching career (HC unless noted)
- 1987–1992: Kansas (assistant)
- 1992–1997: Oregon (assistant)
- 1997–1998: Philadelphia 76ers (assistant)
- 1998–2000: Jacksonville State
- 2000–2007: Wichita State
- 2007–2011: Texas A&M
- 2011–2021: Maryland
- 2026–present: Kansas City

Head coaching record
- Overall: 476–275 (.634)
- Tournaments: 10–10 (NCAA Division I); 5–4 (NIT)

Accomplishments and honors

Championships
- MVC regular season (2006); Big Ten regular season (2020)

Awards
- MVC Coach of the Year (2006); Big Ten Coach of the Year (2015)

Mark Leo Turgeon (born February 5, 1965) is an American college basketball coach who is head coach at University of Missouri–Kansas City. Turgeon previously served as the head men's basketball coach at Jacksonville State University from 1998 to 2000, Wichita State University from 2000 to 2007, Texas A&M University from 2007 to 2011, and University of Maryland from 2011 to 2021.

== Personal ==
Turgeon was born and raised as one of five children in Topeka, Kansas. After graduating from Hayden High School, Turgeon attended the University of Kansas, where he earned a bachelor's degree in personnel administration in 1987. He is married to Ann Fowler, whom he met at KU, and together they have three children.

== Playing career ==
Turgeon played basketball at Hayden High School, helping the team post a 47–3 record and capture two consecutive Class 4A state championships in 1982 and 1983. Turgeon earned All-State Tournament team honors in both of those years.

Although only 5 feet 10 inches out of high school, Turgeon earned a scholarship to play basketball at the University of Kansas under coach Larry Brown. Turgeon played in four straight NCAA tournaments, becoming the first KU player to do so. He was a reserve point guard for the 1985–86 Jayhawk team that won the Big Eight Conference regular season and tournament title and also advanced to the Final Four in the 1986 NCAA Division I men's basketball tournament. The team finished that season 35–4 overall. Turgeon was a team captain for both the 1986 and 1987 squads, was a member of the Big Eight All-Freshmen Team in 1984, and was also a Big Eight All-Academic Performer in 1986. Fans called him "The Surgeon" because, in addition to the phrase rhyming with his surname, he had the ability to "carve up defenses."

After his freshman year, Brown told Turgeon that he would likely never play in the NBA and should consider becoming a coach after college. Turgeon agreed, and Brown soon began asking his advice during games and practices, inquiring "What would you do here?" Turgeon remembers that he never got the answer right; Brown always sighed, rolled his eyes, and did something differently.

== Coaching career ==
=== Early positions ===
After Turgeon earned a degree from the University of Kansas in 1987, he immediately took a position as an assistant to his former coach, Larry Brown. In his first year of coaching, he helped the team win a national championship in the 1988 NCAA tournament. That team has been dubbed "Danny and the Miracles" due to the leadership of National Player of the Year Danny Manning.

Turgeon remained on the Kansas staff when Roy Williams took over after Brown left for the San Antonio Spurs in 1989. He also served as the head coach of the junior varsity team. During this time, Kansas won back-to-back Big Eight Conference championships in 1991 and 1992, and also captured the conference tournament championship in 1992.

Following the 1992 season, Turgeon left Kansas to become the top assistant to recently hired University of Oregon head coach Jerry Green, who had also been an assistant at Kansas. During his five years as an assistant at Oregon, the Ducks were invited to the NCAA tournament for the first time in 34 years, earned a spot in the 1997 NIT, and had three consecutive winning seasons for the first time in two decades. Turgeon also served as the team's recruiting coordinator in 1995, and recruited a class that ranked 35th nationally. The following year, he signed two of the top 100 prospects in the country.

Turgeon briefly left college coaching in 1997. When head coach Jerry Green left Oregon to coach at the University of Tennessee, Turgeon again chose to work for his former coach, Larry Brown, becoming an assistant for the National Basketball Association's Philadelphia 76ers for a year.

=== Jacksonville State ===
Turgeon accepted his first head coaching position in 1998 with Jacksonville State University in Alabama. In his first year as head coach, the team accumulated an 8–18 record, finishing tied for 10th in the Trans America Conference. The following season, his team improved to 17–11, 12–6 in conference, with a 3rd place conference finish.

=== Wichita State ===
After the 1999–2000 season, Turgeon returned to his home state as head coach of the Wichita State Shockers, a team which had had only two winning seasons in the previous 11 years. In his first season with the Shockers, the team lost their first 11 games before winning 9 of their last 17 for a 9–19 record. Of their losses, two came in overtime and four others were decided by fewer than four points. They improved the following season to 15 wins and 15 losses, the most wins the team had had in a season in four years. For the next three seasons, the team steadily improved, earning a berth in the National Invitation Tournament for each of the 2003, 2004, and 2005 seasons.

During the 2006 season, the Shockers continued to improve, winning the Missouri Valley Conference for the first time since 1983. The team earned a trip to the 2006 NCAA tournament, the program's first since 1988. The Shockers defeated 10th-seed Seton Hall by 20 points in their first-round game and upset 2nd-seed Tennessee to advance to the Sweet Sixteen for the first time in 25 years. The Shockers were then defeated by the eventual Final Four participant George Mason, 63–55.

Turgeon and the Shockers started the 2006–2007 season 9–0, winning on the road at George Mason, LSU, and Syracuse. The Shockers were ranked as high as #8 on the AP Poll before entering a slump, ending the season 17-14 and without a postseason.

=== Texas A&M ===
==== 2007–08 season ====
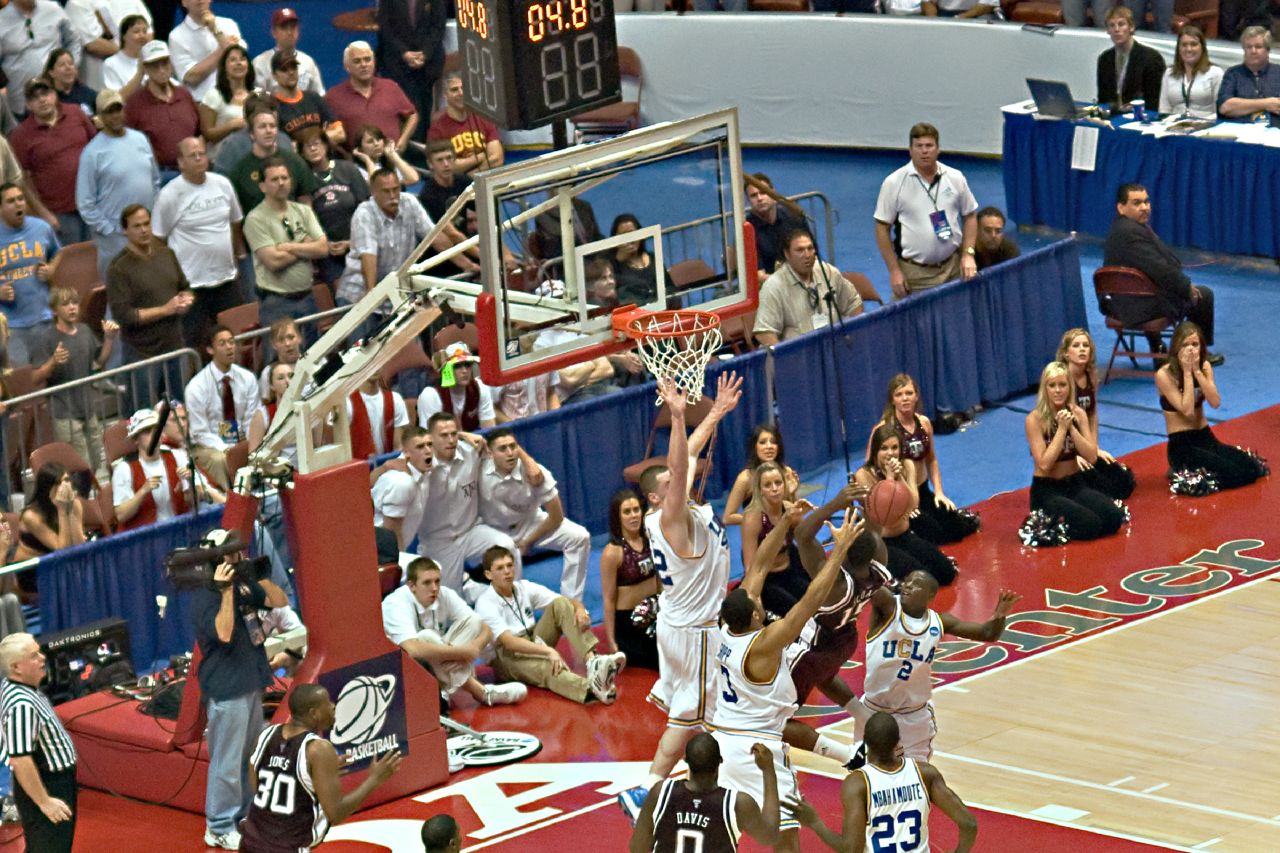
A&M's last offensive play in the UCLA game

After former head men's basketball coach Billy Gillispie left Texas A&M to coach at Kentucky, Turgeon was immediately hired as head coach on April 10, 2007. Turgeon acquired all of Gillispie's recruits for the 2007–08 season, including 5 star-rated DeAndre Jordan. The Aggies started the season ranked 14th in the preseason Coaches Poll.

Once the season progressed, they won the 2007 NIT Season Tip-Off to extend their winning streak to 7–0. They would lose their first game of the season to unranked Arizona, compiling a 7–1 record after the loss. After the Arizona game, they would then win eight straight home games against unranked opponents. Team performance spiraled down once conference play had begun, losing three straight unranked teams—at Texas Tech, at Michael Beasley-led Kansas State, and at home to Baylor. The Baylor game took five overtimes, becoming the longest game in Big 12 history. The Aggies could post wins at their next five matchups, including one over the 10th-ranked rival Texas Longhorns and three away games. They then regressed, losing to Oklahoma State and Nebraska at home. Another high point came when they defeated Texas Tech 98–54 at home, matching their highest margin of victory in school history (set in 1959 against Texas). The Aggies regressed once again, this time losing 64–37 at Oklahoma. The game had marked the worst loss in history since 1967 and had the third-worst shooting percentage (.255) in history. The team also had only one assist and 18 turnovers in the game. After the blowout, the Aggies were able to revenge Baylor in Waco, though came back home to lose their final regular season game to eventual national champion Kansas to finish 8–8 in conference play.

The team received a No. 6 bid to the Big 12 tournament, defeating Iowa State and Kansas State in the first two rounds, but lost to Kansas again in the semifinals. With their 24–10 record after the Big 12 tournament, the Aggies received a No. 9 at-large bid to the West Regional of the NCAA tournament. In the first round, they defeated 8th-seeded BYU 67–62 at Anaheim. In the second round, they faced UCLA at the same site, losing in a close 51–49 contest. The Aggies finished the season with a 25–11 record. The 25 wins matches the record for most wins by a first-year coach at a Big 12 school, set by former Texas coach Tom Penders in the 1988–89 season.

==== 2008–09 season ====
Turgeon's Aggies started the year unranked, with senior Josh Carter receiving preseason All-Big 12 honorable mention. The team won its first four games before falling against Tulsa. After that, the Aggies won 10 straight to close out non-conference play with a 14–1 record. They lost four of their first five Big 12 games, the win coming against then-#21 Baylor. Following a three-game losing streak, A&M won two straight at home against Texas Tech and Oklahoma State before bookending it with another three-game losing streak. The Aggies then won their final six games to close out the season, including wins over rival Texas, Nebraska (on Carter's three-pointer at the buzzer), and then-#12 Missouri. Finishing the regular season with a 23–8 record, the Aggies lost to Texas Tech in the first round of the Big 12 tournament. They earned a #9 seed in the NCAA Tournament West Regional and, for the second straight year, a matchup with BYU. After defeating BYU for the second straight year, 79–66, the Aggies came up short against #1 seed and eventual Final Four participant Connecticut. Texas A&M finished the season with a 24–10 record; Turgeon's 49 wins in his first two seasons was the most by any new coach in Big 12 history. Junior Derrick Roland was selected to the Big 12 All-Defensive Team. Turgeon's recruiting class for the Class of 2013 was ranked #25 by ESPN.

=== Maryland ===
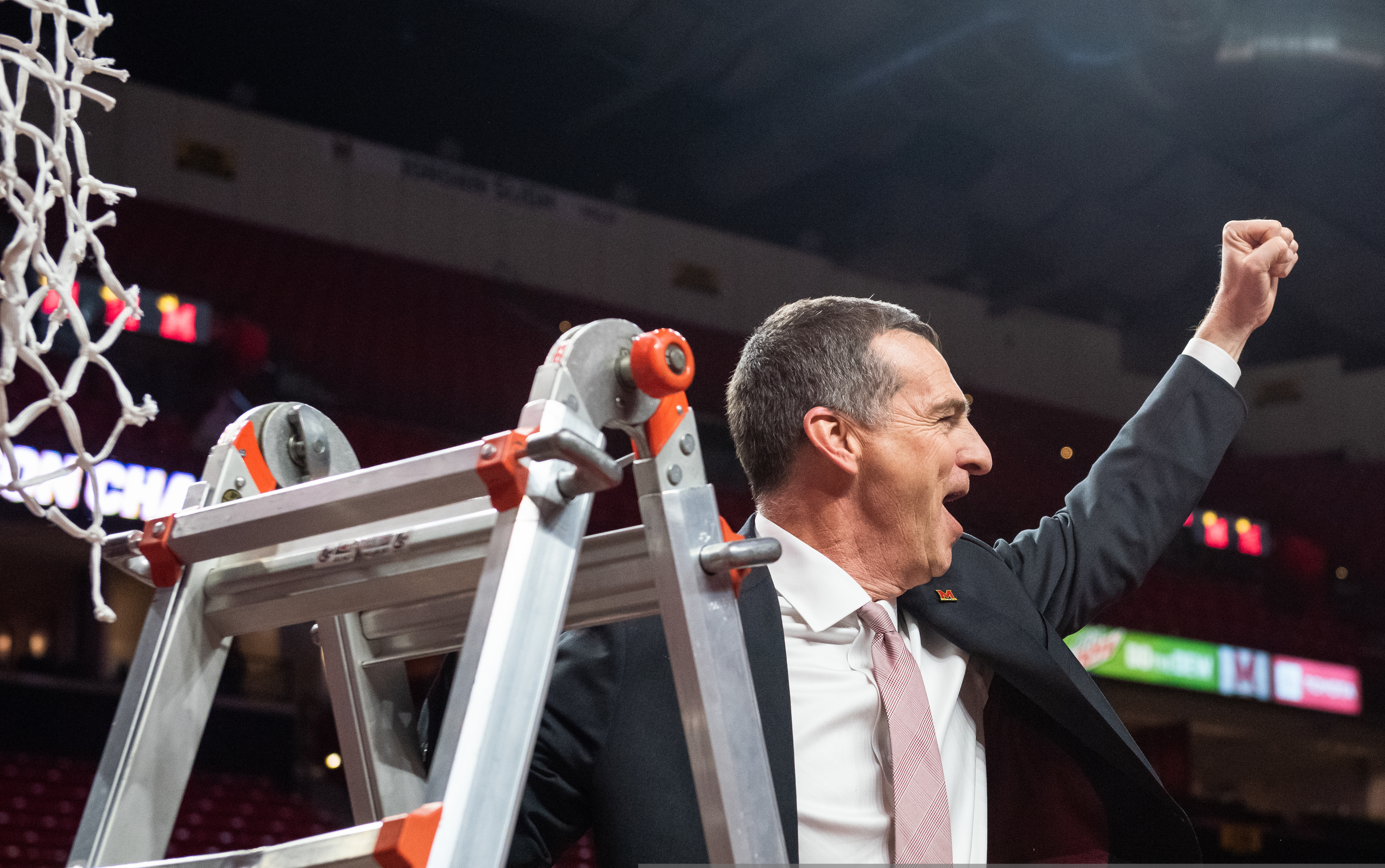
Turgeon in 2020

Prior to his last year at Texas A&M, Turgeon had negotiated a contract extension and salary increase. On the evening of May 9, 2011 at 8pm (local time), Turgeon met with his coaching staff and players to inform them that half an hour earlier he accepted the head coach position at the University of Maryland. He had visited the campus earlier that day and left with an offer. When asked about his decision at an Aggie Athletics press conference, he said "Maryland's got a great basketball tradition. [Texas A&M and Maryland are] real similar. It's a gut feeling." In their meeting earlier that night he told the Aggie players "it was the hardest decision [he] ever had to make... because of [them]." Turgeon said that fan attendance at A&M did not factor into his decision.

After his arrival, Maryland students adopted the phrase "Fear the Turgeon," a play on the school's motto, "Fear the Turtle." Some students, known as the "Turgeonites," created a fan club for the coach and dressed like him on game days. Turgeon captured his first win as the University of Maryland head coach on November 13, 2011, after defeating UNC Wilmington 71–62.

In his first three seasons, Turgeon led Maryland to one postseason, an appearance in the NIT Semifinals in 2013. In 2015, Turgeon was named Big Ten Coach of the Year, after coaching Maryland to a 14–4 conference record.

The 2015-16 Terrapins advanced to the Sweet 16 of the NCAA tournament, defeating South Dakota State and Hawaii as the #5 seed in the South region.

On February 19, 2019, Maryland knocked off #21 Iowa for its first road win against a ranked opponent since January 19, 2008. It was Mark Turgeon's first such victory since December 2, 2006 while coaching at Wichita State.

On December 3, 2021, Turgeon and Maryland mutually agreed to part ways, ending his nearly 11-year tenure as head coach.

=== Kansas City ===
On February 1, 2026, the University of Missouri–Kansas City announced that Turgeon would replace Marvin Menzies as its new men's basketball coach, beginning with the 2026-27 season.

== Head coaching record ==
Record table
| Season | Team | Overall | Conference | Standing | Postseason |
|---|---|---|---|---|---|
Jacksonville State Gamecocks (Trans America Athletic Conference) (1998–2000)
| 1998–99 | Jacksonville State | 8–18 | 3–13 | T–10th | |
| 1999–2000 | Jacksonville State | 17–11 | 12–6 | T–3rd | |
| Jacksonville State: | | 25–29 (.463) | 15–19 (.441) | | |
Wichita State Shockers (Missouri Valley Conference) (2000–2007)
| 2000–01 | Wichita State | 9–19 | 4–14 | 9th | |
| 2001–02 | Wichita State | 15–15 | 9–9 | T–5th | |
| 2002–03 | Wichita State | 18–12 | 12–6 | T–3rd | NIT Opening Round |
| 2003–04 | Wichita State | 21–11 | 12–6 | T–2nd | NIT Second Round |
| 2004–05 | Wichita State | 22–10 | 12–6 | 2nd | NIT Second Round |
| 2005–06 | Wichita State | 26–9 | 14–4 | 1st | NCAA Division I Sweet 16 |
| 2006–07 | Wichita State | 17–14 | 8–10 | 6th | |
| Wichita State: | | 128–90 (.587) | 71–55 (.563) | | |
Texas A&M Aggies (Big 12 Conference) (2007–2011)
| 2007–08 | Texas A&M | 25–11 | 8–8 | 6th | NCAA Division I Round of 32 |
| 2008–09 | Texas A&M | 24–10 | 9–7 | T–4th | NCAA Division I Round of 32 |
| 2009–10 | Texas A&M | 24–10 | 11–5 | T–2nd | NCAA Division I Round of 32 |
| 2010–11 | Texas A&M | 24–9 | 10–6 | 3rd | NCAA Division I Round of 64 |
| Texas A&M: | | 97–40 (.708) | 38–26 (.594) | | |
Maryland Terrapins (Atlantic Coast Conference) (2011–2014)
| 2011–12 | Maryland | 17–15 | 6–10 | 8th | |
| 2012–13 | Maryland | 25–13 | 8–10 | 7th | NIT Semifinal |
| 2013–14 | Maryland | 17–15 | 9–9 | T–7th | |
Maryland Terrapins (Big Ten Conference) (2014–2021)
| 2014–15 | Maryland | 28–7 | 14–4 | 2nd | NCAA Division I Round of 32 |
| 2015–16 | Maryland | 27–9 | 12–6 | T–3rd | NCAA Division I Sweet 16 |
| 2016–17 | Maryland | 24–9 | 12–6 | T–2nd | NCAA Division I Round of 64 |
| 2017–18 | Maryland | 19–13 | 8–10 | 8th | |
| 2018–19 | Maryland | 23–11 | 13–7 | 5th | NCAA Division I Round of 32 |
| 2019–20 | Maryland | 24–7 | 14–6 | T–1st | canceled (COVID-19 pandemic) |
| 2020–21 | Maryland | 17–14 | 9–11 | T–8th | NCAA Division I Round of 32 |
| 2021–22 | Maryland | 5–3 | 0–0 | | |
| Maryland: | | 226–116 (.661) | 105–79 (.571) | | |
Kansas City Roos (The Summit League) (2026–present)
| 2026–27 | Kansas City | 0–0 | 0–0 | | |
| Kansas City: | | 0–0 (–) | 0–0 (–) | | |
| Total: | | 476–275 (.634) | 229–179 (.561) | | |
National champion Postseason invitational champion Conference regular season champion Conference regular season and conference tournament champion Division regular season champion Division regular season and conference tournament champion Conference tournament champion
