= Willowbrook, Illinois =

Willowbrook, Illinois may refer to:

- Willowbrook, DuPage County, Illinois
- Willow Brook Estates, Illinois
