= Bryan Petersen (basketball) =

American basketball coach (born 1987)

Current position
- Title: Head coach
- Team: South Dakota State
- Conference: Summit League
- Record: 14–18 (.438)

Biographical details
- Born: May 21, 1987 (age 39); Clinton, Iowa
- Education: Iowa State University (BA, 2009; M.Ed, 2012)

Playing career
- 2005–2007: Kirkwood CC (IA)
- 2007–2009: Iowa State

Coaching career (HC unless noted)
- 2009–2012: Iowa State (GA)
- 2012–2013: Kirkwood CC (IA) (assistant)
- 2013–2019: Kirkwood CC (IA)
- 2019–2025: South Dakota State (assistant)
- 2025–present: South Dakota State

Head coaching record
- Overall: 14–18 (.438) (NCAA); 157–38 (.805) (NJCAA)
- Tournaments: 0–0 (NCAA Division I)

Bryan Petersen is an American college basketball coach who is currently the head coach for the South Dakota State Jackrabbits.

== Playing career ==
Petersen started his playing career at Kirkwood Community College, where he was named a first team All-American, before walking on at Iowa State, where he averaged 6.2 points, 2.9 rebounds, and 2.8 assists in 64 straight starts and finished 18th all-time in 3-pointers for the Cyclones.

== Coaching career ==
In 2009, Petersen was hired as a graduate assistant at his alma mater Iowa State, serving in the role for two seasons under his former coach, Greg McDermott and one more under Fred Hoiberg, before he was hired as an assistant coach at Kirkwood Community College in 2012. He was promoted to serve as the team's head coach in 2013 and won two national championships in 2016 and 2019. Petersen was also named the 2016 NJCAA D-II coach of the year. Ahead of the 2019 season, he was hired by the South Dakota State Jackrabbits as an assistant coach. On March 30, 2025, Petersen was promoted to be the Jackrabbits head coach, succeeding Eric Henderson.

== Head coaching record ==
Record table
Season	Team	Overall	Conference	Standing	Postseason
South Dakota State Jackrabbits (Summit League) (2025–present)
2025–26	South Dakota State	14–18	7–9	7th	
2026–27	South Dakota State	0–0	0–0		
South Dakota State:		14–18 (.438)	7–9 (.438)		
Total:		14–18 (.438)			
National champion Postseason invitational champion Conference regular season champion Conference regular season and conference tournament champion Division regular season champion Division regular season and conference tournament champion Conference tournament champion
