= South Dakota State Jackrabbits men's basketball =

Basketball team that represents South Dakota State University

2025–26 South Dakota State Jackrabbits men's basketball team
- University: South Dakota State University
- Head coach: Bryan Petersen (1st season)
- Location: Brookings, South Dakota
- Arena: First Bank & Trust Arena (capacity: 5,000)
- Conference: Summit League; NCAA Division I Division
- Nickname: Jackrabbits
- Colors: Blue and yellow
- All-time record: 1535–1040–1 (.592)

NCAA Division I tournament champions
- NCAA Division II; 1963
Other NCAA Division I tournament results
Runner-up	NCAA Division II; 1985
Final Four	NCAA Division II; 1961, 1963, 1985
Elite Eight	NCAA Division II; 1959, 1961, 1963, 1970, 1980, 1985, 1992, 1997
Sweet Sixteen	NCAA Division II; 1959, 1961, 1963, 1969, 1970, 1973, 1980, 1984, 1985, 1991, 1992, 1996, 1997, 1998, 2002
Appearances	NCAA Division II; 1959, 1960, 1961, 1963, 1968, 1970, 1972, 1973, 1978, 1980, 1984, 1985, 1988, 1991, 1992, 1996, 1997, 1998, 2000, 2001, 2002, 2003, 2004; NCAA Division I 2012, 2013, 2016, 2017, 2018, 2022, 2024

Conference tournament champions
- 1991, 2012, 2013, 2016, 2017, 2018, 2022, 2024

Conference regular-season champions
- 1929, 1940, 1943, 1956, 1957, 1959, 1960, 1961, 1963, 1968, 1969, 1970, 1973, 1980, 1985, 1992, 1996, 1997, 1998, 2002, 2013, 2015, 2016, 2018, 2019, 2020, 2021, 2022, 2024

Uniforms
Home	Away	Alternate

The South Dakota State Jackrabbits Men's Basketball team is a basketball team that represents South Dakota State University in Brookings, South Dakota. The Jackrabbits are an NCAA Division I member and have played in the Summit League since 2007. The team has a 1535–1040–1 (.592) overall record.

South Dakota State has traditionally been very successful in men's basketball. Prior to moving to Division I in 2004, the Jackrabbits were a power while in Division II. The team won 20 conference championships with the North Central Conference, advanced to the NCAA Division II Tournament 24 times, and won the 1963 NCAA College Division basketball tournament. Although initially struggling after the move to Division I, the team increased their win total each season, culminating in their first 20 win season at the Division I level in 2011–2012 and advancing to their first NCAA Division I Tournament. The Jackrabbits have appeared in the NCAA tournament seven times, most recently in 2024.

On March 8, 2022, the Jackrabbits advanced to their sixth NCAA tournament with a record of 30–4, a school record. They did it on a 21-game win streak (longest in the nation) and went 21–0 against Summit League opponents, something that had never been done before in conference history.

The Jackrabbits play their home games at the 6,500-seat Frost Arena. Eric Henderson was named head coach of the Jackrabbits on March 27, 2019, after serving as associate head coach under T.J. Otzelberger, who had been named head coach at the University of Nevada-Las Vegas. The Jackrabbits have produced seven NBA draft picks including Nate Wolters, Steve Lingenfelter, and Tom Black. Cerci Mahone was picked up as a free agent and played for the Denver Nuggets.

== Postseason ==
=== NCAA Division I Tournament results ===
The Jackrabbits have appeared in seven NCAA Division I Tournaments. Their combined record is 0–7.

Year	Seed	Round	Opponent	Result
2012	#14	Second Round	#3 Baylor	L 60–68
2013	#13	Second Round	#4 Michigan	L 56–71
2016	#12	First round	#5 Maryland	L 74–79
2017	#16	First round	#1 Gonzaga	L 46–66
2018	#12	First round	#5 Ohio State	L 73–81
2022	#13	First round	#4 Providence	L 57–66
2024	#15	First round	#2 Iowa State	L 65–82

From 2011 to 2015 the round of 64 was known as the second round

=== NIT results ===
The Jackrabbits have appeared in two National Invitation Tournament (NIT). Their record is 1–2.

Year	Round	Opponent	Result
2015	First round Second Round	#1 Colorado State #5 Vanderbilt	W 86–76; L 77–92
2019	First round	#2 Texas	L 73–79

=== CBI results ===
The Jackrabbits have appeared in one College Basketball Invitational (CBI). Their record is 0–1.

Year	Round	Opponent	Result
2014	First round	Old Dominion	L 65–72

=== NCAA Division II Tournament results ===
The Jackrabbits have appeared in the NCAA Division II Tournament 24 times (known as the college division until 1974 but considered the same tournament). Their combined record is 36–23. They were National Champions in 1963, and runners-up in 1985.

Year	Round	Opponent	Result
1959	Regional semifinals Regional Finals; Elite Eight	Augustana (IL); Knox; Cal State Los Angeles	W 73–56; W 106–80; L 67–92
1960	Regional semifinals Regional 3rd-place game	Prairie View A&M; Wartburg	L 65–78; W 93–77
1961	Regional semifinals Regional Finals; Elite Eight; Final Four; National 3rd-place game	Cornell (IA); Prairie View A&M; UC Santa Barbara; Southeast Missouri State; Mount St. Mary's	W 90–71; W 88–84; W 79–65; L 69–81; W 77–76
1963	Regional semifinals Regional Finals; Elite Eight; Final Four; National Championship Game	Cornell (IA); Nebraska Wesleyan; Fresno State; Southern Illinois; Wittenberg	W 71–64; W 77–75; W 84–71; W 80–76; W 44–42
1968	Regional semifinals Regional 3rd-place game	Indiana State; DePauw	L 96–101; W 86–84
1969	Regional semifinals Regional Finals	Lincoln; Southwest Missouri State	W 79–77; L 74–87
1970	Regional semifinals Regional Finals; Elite Eight	Southwest Missouri State; Central Missouri State; Tennessee State	W 82–71; W 92–73; L 89–92
1972	Regional Quarterfinals	Saint Olaf	L 72–87
1973	Regional semifinals Regional Finals	Southwest Missouri State; Coe	W 85–74; L 104–107
1978	Regional semifinals Regional 3rd-place game	Green Bay; Chapman	L 57–80; W 61–59
1980	Regional semifinals Regional Finals; Elite Eight	Stonehill; Western Illinois; Florida Southern	W 74–51; W 98–86; L 71–81
1984	Regional semifinals Regional Finals	Central Connecticut State; Sacred Heart	W 74–59; L 81–88 ^{OT}
1985	Regional semifinals Regional Finals; Elite Eight; Final Four; National Championship Game	Gannon; Grand Valley State; Cal State Hayward; Mount St. Mary's; Jacksonville State	W 73–64; W 58–57; W 62–58; W 78–71; L 73–74
1988	Regional semifinals Regional 3rd-place game	Missouri-St. Louis; Angelo State	L 63–68; W 87–84
1991	Regional semifinals Regional Finals	Metropolitan State; North Dakota	W 92–79; L 51–54
1992	Regional semifinals Regional Finals; Elite Eight	Saint Cloud State; Denver; California (PA)	W 79–74 ^{OT} W 87–57; L 73–84
1996	Regional semifinals Regional Finals	North Dakota State; Fort Hays State	W 94–88; L 90–99
1997	Regional semifinals Regional Finals; Elite Eight	Nebraska-Kearney; Fort Hays State; Lynn (FL)	W 102–83; W 86–74; L 72–78
1998	Regional semifinals Regional Finals	Metropolitan State; Northern State	W 93–79; L 82–88
2000	Regional Quarterfinals	North Dakota	L 67–73
2001	Regional Quarterfinals	Metropolitan State	L 80–91
2002	Regional semifinals Regional Finals	Nebraska-Omaha; Metropolitan State	W 96–76; L 86–87
2003	Regional Quarterfinals; Regional semifinals	Fort Hays State; Nebraska-Kearney	W 84–78; L 85–86
2004	Regional Quarterfinals; Regional semifinals	Northern State; Metropolitan State	W 99–80; L 69–109

=== NAIA Tournament results ===
The Jackrabbits made four appearances in the NAIA tournament. Their record is 0-4.

Year	Round	Opponent	Result
1943	First Round	East Central State	L 47-53
1948	First Round	Louisville	L 60-63
1951	First Round	Florida State	L 70-85
1956	First Round	Pacific Lutheran	L 64-79

== Current coaching staff ==
Name	Title
Eric Henderson	Head coach
Rob Klinkefus	Associate Head Coach
Bryan Petersen	Assistant coach
Tramel Barnes	Assistant coach
Tyler Glidden	Director of Operations
Reed Tellinghuisen	Graduate Assistant Coach

== Records ==
=== All-Time Leaders ===
*Accurate as of end of 2018–19 season. See all-time records on gojacks.com—access-date=2019-04-18

==== Points ====
Rank	Player	Career	Total
1	Mike Daum	2015–2019	3,067
2	Nate Wolters	2009–2013	2,363
3	Mark Tetzlaff	1981–1985	1,931
4	Lee Colburn	1969–1973	1,822
5	Austin Hansen	1999–2003	1,815
6	Jordan Dykstra	2010–2014	1,661
7	Steve Brown	1974–1978	1,534
8	Clint Sargent	2007–2011	1,505
9	Don Jacobson	1958–1961	1,488
10	Garrett Callahan	2006–2010	1,449

==== Assists ====
Rank	Player	Career	Total
1	Nate Wolters	2009–2013	669
2	Brian Norberg	1995–1999	605
3	Kyle Adams	1984–1988	471
4	Chris Stoebner	1999–2003	404
5	Tony Matthews	1987–1991	393
6	Tom McDonald	1982–1986	386
7	Jermaine Showers	1992–1996	363
8	Jason Sempsrott	1993–1997	343
9	Cer'Ci Mahone	1977–1979	297
10	Troy Bouman	1990–1994	291

==== Rebounds ====
Rank	Player	Career	Total
1	Mike Daum	2015–2019	1,236
2	Mark Tetzlaff	1981–1985	1,132
3	Kai Williams	2006–2010	844
4	Lee Colburn	1969–1973	837
5	Jordan Dykstra	2010–2014	835
6	Dave Thomas	1969–1973	810
7	Sid Bostic	1961–1964	804
8	Larry Nickelson	1975–1978	755
9	Wayne Gaughran	1957–1960	737
10	Bob Winzenburg	1978–1982	736

== Jackrabbits in NBA ==
=== Draft ===
The following former South Dakota State players were selected in the NBA draft or ABA draft:

- Tom Black
- Lee Colburn
- Raul Duarte
- Don Jacobsen
- Steve Lingenfelter
- Guy Mackner
- Baylor Scheierman
- Nate Wolters

== Media coverage ==
All home and road games are covered on the Jackrabbit Sports Network. The broadcast range of the Jackrabbit Sports Network covers eight states (South Dakota, Minnesota, North Dakota, Iowa, Nebraska, Missouri, Kansas, and Wyoming), and consists of the following stations:

- WNAX 570AM (Flagship Station)
- KJJQ 910AM
- KRKI 99.1FM
- KGFX 1060AM
- KSDR 1480AM

In 2023/2024, the Summit League finalized a three-year official television contract with CBS Sports Network for linear broadcasting, and partnered with Midco to launch the branded Summit League Network for direct-to-consumer viewing.
