= First Bank and Trust Arena =

Arena

First Bank & Trust Arena
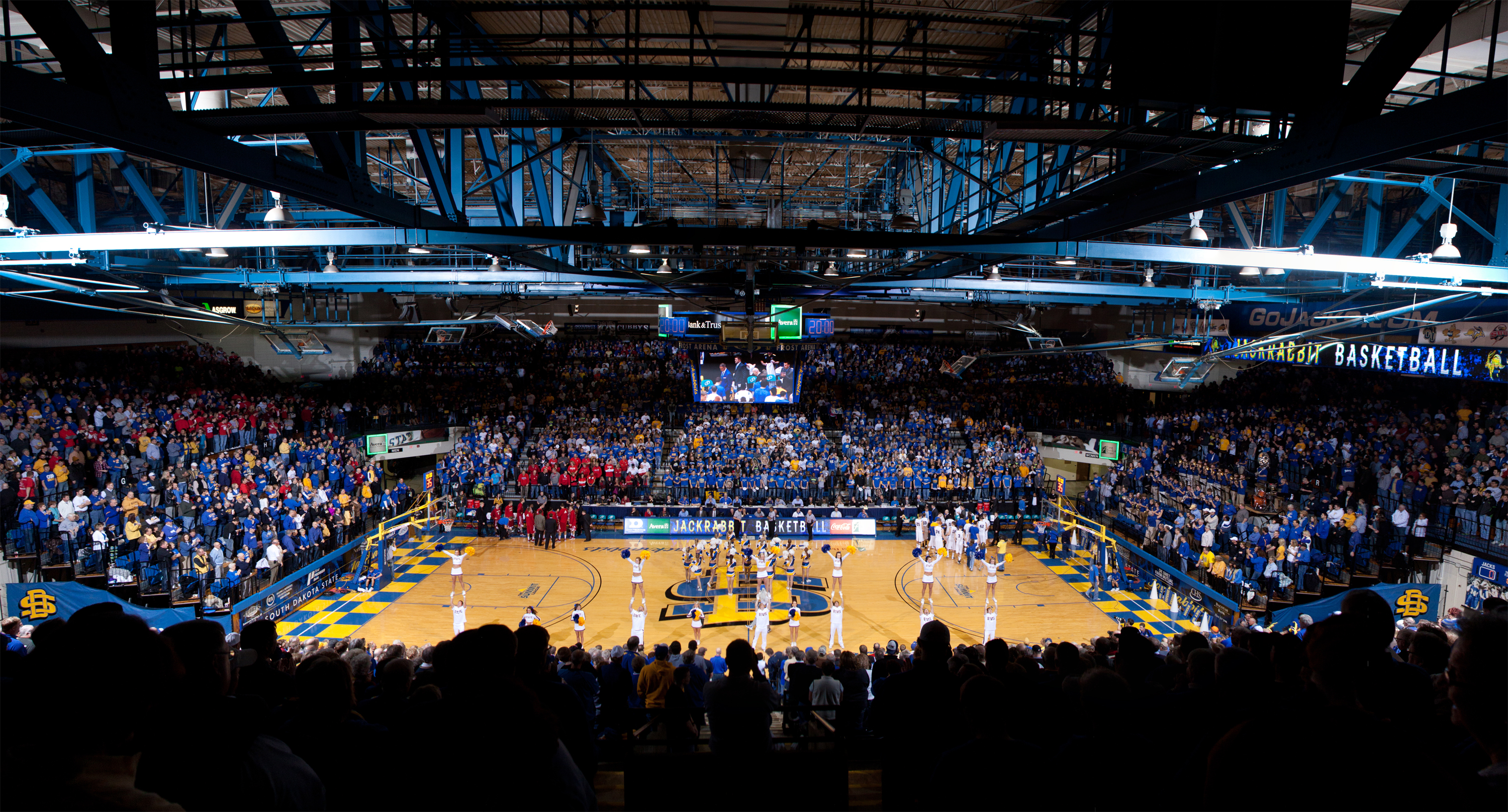
- First Bank & Trust Arena during a South Dakota State basketball game against their in-state rival, the University of South Dakota.
- Interactive map of First Bank & Trust Arena
- Former names: Frost Arena (through October 2, 2024)
- Location: 1165 Jackrabbit Ave Brookings, South Dakota 57007
- Coordinates: 44.317984°N 96.779058°W
- Owner: South Dakota State University
- Operator: South Dakota State University
- Capacity: 5,000

Construction
- Groundbreaking: September 22, 1970
- Built: 1970–1973
- Opened: February 2, 1973
- Renovated: 1992, 2004, 2024
- Cost: $3.685 million ($26.7 million in 2025 dollars)

Tenants
- South Dakota State Jackrabbits men's and women's basketball, women's volleyball, men's wrestling

First Bank & Trust Arena is a 5,000-seat multi-purpose arena in Brookings, South Dakota. It was built on the east side of campus in 1973 and is home to the South Dakota State University Jackrabbits men's and women's basketball, women's volleyball, and men's wrestling teams, replacing the Gymnasium-Armory, built in 1918 and nicknamed "The Barn," which still resides on the westside of campus. First Bank & Trust Arena was formerly known as Frost Arena, which was named after former SDSU basketball coach Reuben B. "Jack" Frost.

The Jackrabbits men's basketball team have enjoyed a tremendous home court advantage at home, compiling a record of 426–127 (.770) through the 2011-12 season. Likewise, the Jackrabbits women's basketball team also has enjoyed their home court advantage with a 349–92 home record.

Originally featuring 9,500 seats, the facility, part of the Stanley J. Marshall HPER Center (HPER is short for Health, Physical Education, & Recreation and is pronounced 'Hyper'), now seats 5,000 fans for basketball. The arena's attendance record is for the SDSU-Augustana men's game on February 11, 1989, which attracted 9,456 fans. Renovations in 1992 and 2004 eliminated some of the bench seating and installed individual seats in parts of the arena. In 2005, an updated scoreboard, sound system, and a new arena floor were installed.

In addition to SDSU athletic and school events, Frost Arena has hosted the 2003 NCAA North Central Regional women's basketball tournament, six NCAA North Central Regional men's basketball tournaments, four NCAA Division II Wrestling National Championships, women's WNIT Tournament action in 2007 and 2008, along with numerous concerts and state basketball tournaments.

The first nationally televised game from Frost Arena was February 18, 2012, as the Jackrabbits men's basketball team took on the Buffalo Bulls on ESPNU.

The Arena underwent a $53.1 million renovation which included suites, premium seating, increased concession areas and more restrooms. The renovation was fully finished in September 2024, with the official opening/first event being a SDSU's women's volleyball match versus the Kansas City Roos on October 3, 2024.

== See also ==
- List of NCAA Division I basketball arenas
