= 2025–26 Drake Bulldogs men's basketball team =

American college basketball season

2025–26 Drake Bulldogs men's basketball
- Conference: Missouri Valley Conference
- Record: 14–20 (6–14 MVC)
- Head coach: Eric Henderson (1st season)
- Assistant coaches: Rob Klinkefus; Tramel Barnes; Billy Brown; Warren Niles; Gavin Block
- Home arena: Knapp Center (Capacity: 6,424)

2025–26 Missouri Valley Conference men's basketball standings
	Conf.				Overall
Team	W		L	PCT	W		L	PCT
Belmont	16	–	4	.800	26	–	6	.813
Bradley	13	–	7	.650	21	–	13	.618
Illinois State	12	–	8	.600	23	–	13	.639
Murray State	12	–	8	.600	20	–	13	.606
UIC	12	–	8	.600	19	–	16	.543
Northern Iowa †	11	–	9	.550	23	–	13	.639
Valparaiso	11	–	9	.550	18	–	15	.545
Southern Illinois	10	–	10	.500	16	–	16	.500
Drake	6	–	14	.300	14	–	20	.412
Indiana State	4	–	16	.200	11	–	21	.344
Evansville	3	–	17	.150	7	–	25	.219
† 2026 MVC tournament winner

The 2025–26 Drake Bulldogs men's basketball team represented Drake University in the 2025–26 NCAA Division I men's basketball season. The Bulldogs, led by Eric Henderson in his first season as head coach, played their home games at the Knapp Center in Des Moines, Iowa as members of the Missouri Valley Conference (MVC).

The Bulldogs debuted their third head coach in three years, after previous head coach Ben McCollum left the team after just one season to take the head coach position at Iowa. On March 28, Drake named South Dakota State's Eric Henderson as the team's new head coach.

This season marked the first time since 2022 that Drake failed to qualify for the NCAA Tournament, as they were defeated by UIC in the Semifinal of the conference tournament.

== Previous season ==
The Bulldogs finished the 2024-25 season 27–3, 17–3 in MVC play to finish in first place. In the MVC tournament, they defeated Southern Illinois, Belmont, and Bradley to win the tournament championship. As a result, they received the conference's automatic bid to the NCAA tournament as the No. 11 seed in the West region, where they upset Missouri in the first round, earning Drake's first NCAA tournament win since 1971. In the second round, they lost to No. 3 seed Texas Tech.

== Offseason ==
=== Departures ===
Name	Number	Pos.	Height	Weight	Year	Hometown	Reason for departure
Cam Manyawu	3	F	6'8"	230	So	Kansas City, MO	Transferred to Iowa
Isaiah Jackson	4	G	6'3"	180	GS	Independence, MO	Graduated
Tavion Banks	6	G/F	6'7"	200	Jr	Kansas City, MO	Transferred to Iowa
Kael Combs	11	G	6'4"	190	So	Nixa, MO	Transferred to Iowa
Bennett Stirtz	14	G	6'4"	180	Jr	Liberty, MO	Transferred to Iowa
Mitch Mascari	22	G	6'5"	200	GS	Geneva, IL	Graduated
Isaia Howard	23	G	6'5"	200	Fr	Plattsburg, MO	Transferred to Iowa
Nate Ferguson	24	F	6'8"	220	RS Sr	Lemont, IL	Graduated
Joey Matteoni	44	F	6'8"	215	Fr	Overland Park, KS	Transferred to Iowa
Daniel Abreu	54	F	6'6"	220	GS	Springfield, MO	Graduated

=== Incoming transfers ===
Name	Number	Pos.	Height	Weight	Year	Hometown	Previous School
Braden Appelhans	0	G	6'6"	190	RS Jr	Blue Springs, MO	New Mexico
Owen Larson	1	G	6'1"	190	So	Estherville, IA	South Dakota State
Jalen Quinn	3	G	6'3"	190	Sr	Tuscola, IL	Loyola Chicago
Wilguens Jr. Exacte	7	F	6'6"	230	Jr	Montreal, QC	Bowling Green
Okku Federiko	8	F	6'9"	210	So	Helsinki, FI	South Carolina
Jaehshon Thomas	22	G	6'3"	185	Sr	Aurora, IL	Charlotte
Isaiah Carr	24	C	6'11"	235	Sr	Las Cruces, NM	Denver

=== 2025 Recruiting Class ===
College recruiting
Name	Hometown	School	Height	Weight	Commit date
Griffen Goodbary; PF	Sioux Falls, SD	Sioux Falls Christian	6 ft 10 in (2.08 m)	250 lb (110 kg)	Nov 14, 2024
Griffen Goodbary; PF	Recruit ratings: No ratings found				
LJ Rush; PG	Wendell, NC	1 of 1 Academy	5 ft 10 in (1.78 m)	168 lb (76 kg)	-
LJ Rush; PG	Recruit ratings: No ratings found				
Bryson Bahl; SF	Papillion, NE	Papillion-La Vista South	6 ft 5 in (1.96 m)	160 lb (73 kg)	Apr 2, 2025
Bryson Bahl; SF	Recruit ratings: No ratings found				
Heri Bukinga; F/C	Goma, DRC	DME Academy	6 ft 11 in (2.11 m)	235 lb (107 kg)	-
Heri Bukinga; F/C	Recruit ratings: No ratings found				
Overall recruit ranking: 247Sports: 242 On3: - ESPN: -
Note: In many cases, Scout, Rivals, 247Sports, On3, and ESPN may conflict in their listings of height and weight.; In these cases, the average was taken. ESPN grades are on a 100-point scale.; Sources: "2025 Team Ranking". Rivals.

== Preseason ==
The Bulldogs entered the season as the defending Arch Madness champions and were picked to finish sixth in the conference for the upcoming season. Senior transfers Jalen Quinn, Isaiah Carr, and Jaehshon Thomas were named to the 2025-26 MVC Men's Basketball "Players to Watch" list.

On October 11, the Bulldogs traveled to Charles Koch Arena in Wichita, Kansas to take on the Wichita State Shockers in a non-traditional scrimmage. There was no official score kept, and although fans could attend and watch the event, no winner or loser was declared. Drake coach Eric Henderson stated that fans "[Shouldn't] read too much into [the result]. Both teams had moments where they were pretty good, and we both learned a lot about our teams."

== Roster ==
2025–26 Drake Bulldogs men's basketball team
Players
Coaches

Pos.	#	Name	Height	Weight	Year	Previous school	Hometown
G	0	Braden Appelhans	6 ft 6 in (1.98 m)	190 lb (86 kg)	RS Jr	New Mexico	Blue Springs, MO
G	1	Owen Larson	6 ft 1 in (1.85 m)	190 lb (86 kg)	So	South Dakota State	Estherville, IA
F	2	Griffen Goodbary	6 ft 10 in (2.08 m)	220 lb (100 kg)	Fr	Sioux Falls Christian	Sioux Falls, SD
G	3	Jalen Quinn	6 ft 3 in (1.91 m)	190 lb (86 kg)	Sr	Loyola Chicago	Tuscola, IL
F	7	Wilguens Jr. Exacte	6 ft 6 in (1.98 m)	230 lb (104 kg)	Jr	Bowling Green	Montreal, QC
F	8	Okku Federiko	6 ft 9 in (2.06 m)	210 lb (95 kg)	So	South Carolina	Helsinki, FI
G	10	Eli Shetlar	6 ft 6 in (1.98 m)	190 lb (86 kg)	RS So	Indiana State	Wichita, KS
G	11	LJ Rush (redshirt)	5 ft 10 in (1.78 m)	175 lb (79 kg)	Fr	1 of 1 Academy	Wendell, NC
G	20	Bryson Bahl (redshirt)	6 ft 4 in (1.93 m)	180 lb (82 kg)	Fr	Papillion-La Vista South	Papillion, NE
G	21	Andrew Alia	6 ft 3 in (1.91 m)	195 lb (88 kg)	RS Jr	St Joseph	Kenosha, WI
G	22	Jaehshon Thomas	6 ft 3 in (1.91 m)	185 lb (84 kg)	Sr	Charlotte	Aurora, IL
C	24	Isaiah Carr	6 ft 11 in (2.11 m)	235 lb (107 kg)	Sr	Denver	Las Cruces, NM
C	32	Heri Bukinga (redshirt)	6 ft 11 in (2.11 m)	235 lb (107 kg)	Fr	DME Sports Academy	Goma, DRC

Head coach

- Eric Henderson (Wayne State (NE))

Assistant coach(es)

- Rob Klinkefus (Buena Vista)
  (Drake)
- Tramel Barnes (Southwest Minnesota State)
- Billy Brown (North Dakota)
- Warren Niles (Oral Roberts)
- Gavin Block (Ohio)

Legend

- (C) Team captain
- (S) Suspended
- (I) Ineligible
- (W) Walk-on
- Injured
- Current redshirt

Roster
Last update: October 10, 2025

== Schedule and results ==
Date time, TV	Rank^{#}	Opponent^{#}	Result	Record	High points	High rebounds	High assists	Site (attendance) city, state
Non-Conference Regular Season
November 3, 2025*; 3:00 pm, YouTube		vs. Northern Arizona; Field of 68 Opening Day Marathon	W 77–71	1–0	20 – Quinn	12 – Exacte	4 – Exacte	Sanford Pentagon (1,420); Sioux Falls, SD
November 6, 2025*; 6:30 pm, ESPN+		Robert Morris	L 79–81	1–1	20 – Quinn	15 – Federiko	3 – Quinn	Knapp Center (3,142); Des Moines, IA
November 10, 2025*; 6:30 pm, ESPN+		Simpson (IA)	W 89–51	2–1	15 – Appelhans	8 – Exacte	5 – Quinn	Knapp Center (3,164); Des Moines, IA
November 14, 2025*; 6:30 pm, ESPN+		SIUE	L 59–61	2–2	12 – Tied	8 – Federiko	3 – Tied	Knapp Center (3,234); Des Moines, IA
November 17, 2025*; 6:00 pm, FloSports		at Charleston	W 71–62	3–2	17 – Quinn	9 – Shetlar	4 – Exacte	TD Arena (4,786); Charleston, SC
November 21, 2025*; 6:30 pm, ESPN+		Buena Vista	W 98–52	4–2	16 – Federiko	7 – Exacte	6 – Federiko	Knapp Center (3,277); Des Moines, IA
November 28, 2025*; 8:30 pm, CBSSN		vs. LSU; Emerald Coast Classic semifinal	L 62–71	4−3	20 – Quinn	6 – Tied	5 – Goodbary	Raider Arena (1,800); Niceville, FL
November 29, 2025*; 4:00 pm, CBSSN		vs. Georgia Tech; Emerald Coast Classic consolation	W 84–74	5−3	31 – Quinn	8 – Federiko	7 – Quinn	Raider Arena (1,500); Niceville, FL
December 2, 2025*; 6:30 pm, MC22/ESPN+		Western Illinois	W 108–57	6−3	30 – Appelhans	8 – Shetlar	6 – Quinn	Knapp Center (2,760); Des Moines, IA
December 5, 2025*; 6:30 pm, MC22/ESPN+		UAB	L 69–74	6−4	26 – Quinn	6 – Quinn	2 – Tied	Knapp Center (3,560); Des Moines, IA
December 13, 2025*; 1:00 pm, MC22/ESPN+		North Dakota State	L 94–99	6−5	24 – Quinn	6 – Tied	6 – Quinn	Knapp Center (3,056); Des Moines, IA
Conference Regular Season
December 18, 2025; 7:00 pm, ESPN+		at Murray State	L 72–81	6–6 (0–1)	19 – Quinn	8 – Larson	3 – Larson	CFSB Center (4,377); Murray, KY
December 21, 2025; 3:00 pm, ESPN+		at Evansville	W 66–65	7–6 (1–1)	18 – Thomas	7 – Shetlar	2 – Tied	Ford Center (4,207); Evansville, IN
December 29, 2025; 8:00 pm, Gray Media/ESPN+		Illinois State	L 56–73	7–7 (1–2)	11 – Federiko	4 – Alia	3 – Larson	Knapp Center (3,592); Des Moines, IA
January 4, 2026; 2:00 pm, ESPN+		Indiana State	W 74–72	8–7 (2–2)	18 – Quinn	9 – Alia	5 – Quinn	Knapp Center (3,713); Des Moines, IA
January 7, 2026; 8:00 pm, Gray Media/ESPN+		at Bradley	L 66–93	8–8 (2–3)	18 – Thomas	7 – Shetlar	3 – Shetlar	Carver Arena (5,187); Peoria, IL
January 10, 2026; 5:00 pm, ESPN+		Belmont	L 76–78	8–9 (2–4)	26 – Shetlar	6 – Quinn	4 – Larson	Knapp Center (3,657); Des Moines, IA
January 14, 2026; 7:00 pm, ESPN+		at Southern Illinois	W 76–73 ^{OT}	9–9 (3–4)	21 – Quinn	11 – Shetlar	4 – Quinn	Banterra Center (4,033); Carbondale, IL
January 17, 2026; 2:00 pm, ESPN+		at UIC	L 67–74	9–10 (3–5)	28 – Quinn	7 – Shetlar	4 – Shetlar	Credit Union 1 Arena (1,274); Chicago, IL
January 21, 2026; 6:00 pm, CBSSN		Murray State	W 101–90	10–10 (4–5)	34 – Quinn	6 – Tied	2 – Tied	Knapp Center (3,148); Des Moines, IA
January 24, 2026; 12:00 pm, ESPN+		at Indiana State	W 76–62	11–10 (5–5)	27 – Quinn	7 – Larson	4 – Larson	Hulman Center (4,591); Terre Haute, IN
January 28, 2026; 6:30 pm, MC22/ESPN+		Evansville	W 82–78	12–10 (6–5)	26 – Quinn	9 – Alia	5 – Quinn	Knapp Center (3,441); Des Moines, IA
January 31, 2026; 5:00 pm, CBSSN		Bradley	L 73–87	12–11 (6–6)	32 – Quinn	11 – Alia	3 – Tied	Knapp Center (4,342); Des Moines, IA
February 3, 2026; 8:00 pm, Gray Media/ESPN+		at Belmont	L 90–103	12–12 (6–7)	22 – Quinn	5 – Larson	4 – Larson	Curb Event Center (1,501); Nashville, TN
February 6, 2026; 7:00 pm, ESPN+		at Illinois State	L 76–86	12–13 (6–8)	17 – Tied	11 – Alia	5 – Larson	CEFCU Arena (5,191); Normal, IL
February 9, 2026; 6:30 pm, MC22/ESPN+		Valparaiso	L 76–81	12–14 (6–9)	33 – Quinn	7 – Alia	3 – Quinn	Knapp Center (3,078); Des Moines, IA
February 12, 2026; 6:30 pm, ESPN+		UIC	L 70–80	12–15 (6–10)	17 – Shetlar	7 – Federiko	3 – Federiko	Knapp Center (3,495); Des Moines, IA
February 15, 2026; 2:00 pm, CBSSN		at Northern Iowa; Rivalry	L 62–86	12–16 (6–11)	20 – Quinn	5 – Tied	2 – Tied	McLeod Center (5,786); Cedar Falls, IA
February 18, 2026; 6:30 pm, ESPN+		Southern Illinois	L 61–66	12–17 (6–12)	23 – Quinn	10 – Quinn	3 – Larson	Knapp Center (3,152); Des Moines, IA
February 25, 2026; 7:00 pm, ESPN+		at Valparaiso	L 71–74	12–18 (6–13)	18 – Larson	6 – Shetlar	5 – Shetlar	Athletics–Recreation Center (1,835); Valparaiso, IN
March 1, 2026; 2:00 pm, ESPN+		Northern Iowa; Senior Day / Rivalry	L 53–75	12–19 (6–14)	15 – Tied	8 – Alia	3 – Larson	Knapp Center (4,488); Des Moines, IA
Conference Tournament
March 5, 2026*; 3:30 pm, ESPN+	(9)	vs. (8) Southern Illinois; Arch Madness Opening Round	W 67–63	13–19	22 – Quinn	11 – Alia	4 – Larson	Enterprise Center (8,960); St. Louis, MO
March 6, 2026*; 12:00 pm, ESPN+	(9)	vs. (1) Belmont; Arch Madness Quarterfinal	W 100–79	14–19	31 – Quinn	8 – Larson	8 – Larson	Enterprise Center (8,068); St. Louis, MO
March 7, 2026*; 2:30 pm, CBSSN	(9)	vs. (5) UIC; Arch Madness Semifinal	L 51–72	14–20	14 – Quinn	5 – Carr	5 – Larson	Enterprise Center (7,444); St. Louis, MO
*Non-conference game. ^{#}Rankings from AP Poll. (#) Tournament seedings in parentheses. All times are in Central Time Zone.

== See also ==
- 2025–26 Drake Bulldogs women's basketball team
