= 2025–26 UIC Flames men's basketball team =

American college basketball season

2025–26 UIC Flames men's basketball

NIT, First Round
- Conference: Missouri Valley Conference
- Record: 19–16 (12–8 MVC)
- Head coach: Rob Ehsan (2nd season)
- Associate head coach: Kevin Devitt (2nd season)
- Assistant coaches: David Berkun (2nd season); Ryan Davis (2nd season); Jaime Smith (2nd season)
- Home arena: Credit Union 1 Arena

2025–26 Missouri Valley Conference men's basketball standings
	Conf.				Overall
Team	W		L	PCT	W		L	PCT
Belmont	16	–	4	.800	26	–	6	.813
Bradley	13	–	7	.650	21	–	13	.618
Illinois State	12	–	8	.600	21	–	12	.636
Murray State	12	–	8	.600	20	–	13	.606
UIC	12	–	8	.600	19	–	16	.543
Northern Iowa †	11	–	9	.550	23	–	13	.639
Valparaiso	11	–	9	.550	18	–	15	.545
Southern Illinois	10	–	10	.500	16	–	16	.500
Drake	6	–	14	.300	14	–	19	.424
Indiana State	4	–	16	.200	11	–	21	.344
Evansville	3	–	17	.150	7	–	25	.219
† 2026 MVC tournament winner As of March 20, 2026

The 2025–26 UIC Flames men's basketball team represented the University of Illinois Chicago during the 2025–26 NCAA Division I men's basketball season. The Flames, led by second-year head coach Rob Ehsan, played their home games at the Credit Union 1 Arena in Chicago, Illinois, as members of the Missouri Valley Conference.

== Previous season ==
The Flames finished the 2024–25 season 17–14, 10–10 in MVC play to finish in a tie for fifth place. In the MVC tournament, they were defeated by Valparaiso in the opening round.

== Roster ==
2025–26 UIC Flames men's basketball team
Players
Coaches

Pos.	#	Name	Height	Weight	Year	Previous school	Hometown
G	0	Ahmad Henderson II	5 ft 10 in (1.78 m)	144 lb (65 kg)	Jr	Niagara	Chicago, IL
F	1	Jayce Nathaniel	6 ft 8 in (2.03 m)	227 lb (103 kg)	RS Fr	AZ Compass Prep	Buford, GA
G	2	Elijah Crawford	6 ft 3 in (1.91 m)	187 lb (85 kg)	So	BYU	Augusta, GA
G	3	Carlos Harris III	6 ft 1 in (1.85 m)	190 lb (86 kg)	RS Fr	Curie High School	Chicago, IL
F	4	Nano Barrantes	6 ft 10 in (2.08 m)	217 lb (98 kg)	Fr	Grand View Christian	Des Moines, IA
G	5	Rashund Washington Jr.	6 ft 5 in (1.96 m)	197 lb (89 kg)	Fr	East Laurens HS	Dublin, GA
F	7	Abdul Momoh	6 ft 8 in (2.03 m)	249 lb (113 kg)	GS	Central Connecticut State	Carteret, NJ
G	10	Josiah Hammons	6 ft 2 in (1.88 m)	180 lb (82 kg)	GS	Sam Houston	Chicago, IL
G	14	Andy Johnson	6 ft 6 in (1.98 m)	197 lb (89 kg)	Fr	Randall K. Cooper HS	Union, KY
G	20	Sam Silverstein	6 ft 6 in (1.98 m)	219 lb (99 kg)	GS	California Baptist	Glencoe, IL
F	21	Ante Beljan	6 ft 10 in (2.08 m)	241 lb (109 kg)	RS Jr	Little Rock	Trogir, Croatia
G	22	Mekhi Lowery	6 ft 7 in (2.01 m)	204 lb (93 kg)	Jr	Towson	Bellwood, IL
G	25	AJ Morgan	6 ft 5 in (1.96 m)	213 lb (97 kg)	Fr	Vernon Hills HS	Vernon Hills, IL
G	27	Taj Walters-Whitaker	6 ft 2 in (1.88 m)	195 lb (88 kg)	GS	Culver–Stockton	Flossmoor, IL

Head coach

- Rob Ehsan (UC Davis)

Assistant coach(es)

- Kevin Devitt (DePaul)
- David Berkun (VCU)
- Ryan Davis (Chicago)
- Jaime Smith (Alabama–Huntsville)

Legend

- (C) Team captain
- (S) Suspended
- (I) Ineligible
- (W) Walk-on
- Injured
- Current redshirt

Roster
Last update: November 2, 2025

== Schedule and results ==
Date time, TV	Rank^{#}	Opponent^{#}	Result	Record	Site (attendance) city, state
Regular Season
November 3, 2025*; 7:00 p.m., ESPN+		Detroit Mercy	W 91–71	1–0	Credit Union 1 Arena (1,155); Chicago, IL
November 7, 2025*; 7:00 p.m., ESPN+		at Oregon State	L 73–76	1–1	Gill Coliseum (3,476); Corvallis, OR
November 11, 2025*; 7:00 p.m., ESPN+		St. Francis (IL); Homecoming	W 98–55	2–1	Credit Union 1 Arena (2,187); Chicago, IL
November 15, 2025*; 1:00 p.m., NEC Front Row		at Chicago State	W 67–63	3–1	Emil and Patricia Jones; Convocation Center (712); Chicago, IL
November 20, 2025*; 2:30 p.m., BallerTV		vs. High Point; GEICO Boardwalk Battle semifinal	L 80–90	3–2	Ocean Center (449); Daytona Beach, FL
November 22, 2025*; 4:00 p.m., BallerTV		vs. Southern Indiana; GEICO Boardwalk Battle consolation	W 84–73	4–2	Ocean Center (516); Daytona Beach, FL
November 26, 2025*; 1:00 p.m., ESPN+		at Robert Morris	L 74–88	4–3	UPMC Events Center (922); Moon Township, PA
December 3, 2025*; 11:00 a.m., ESPN+		Arkansas–Pine Bluff	L 62–63	4–4	Credit Union 1 Arena (2,394); Chicago, IL
December 7, 2025*; 1:00 p.m., ESPN+		at Yale	L 66–80	4–5	John J. Lee Ampitheater (799); New Haven, CT
December 13, 2025; 3:00 p.m., ESPN+		at Belmont	L 84–87	4–6 (0–1)	Curb Event Center (1,428); Nashville, TN
December 17, 2025; 4:00 p.m., Marquee/ESPN+		Northern Iowa	L 54–60	4–7 (0–2)	Credit Union 1 Arena; Chicago, IL
December 21, 2025*; 1:00 p.m., ESPN+		at Charlotte	L 76–88 ^{OT}	4–8	Halton Arena (2,121); Charlotte, NC
December 29, 2025*; 3:00 p.m., ESPN+		Illinois Tech	W 102–64	5–8	Credit Union 1 Arena (893); Chicago, IL
January 1, 2026; 8:00 p.m., MVC TV/ESPN+		Murray State	L 77–81	5–9 (0–3)	Credit Union 1 Arena (805); Chicago, IL
January 4, 2026; 1:00 p.m., ESPN+		at Valparaiso	L 59–66	5–10 (0–4)	Athletics–Recreation Center (1,494); Valparaiso, IN
January 7, 2026; 7:00 p.m., ESPN+		Southern Illinois	W 70–57	6–10 (1–4)	Credit Union 1 Arena (778); Chicago, IL
January 10, 2026; 4:00 p.m., ESPN+		at Illinois State	W 63–59	7–10 (2–4)	CEFCU Arena (4,859); Normal, IL
January 13, 2026; 6:00 p.m., MVC TV/ESPN+		at Northern Iowa	W 69–61	8–10 (3–4)	McLeod Center (3,344); Cedar Falls, IA
January 17, 2026; 2:00 p.m., ESPN+		Drake	W 74–67	9–10 (4–4)	Credit Union 1 Arena (1,274); Chicago, IL
January 20, 2026; 7:00 p.m., Marquee/ESPN+		Evansville	W 76–49	10–10 (5–4)	Credit Union 1 Arena (663); Chicago, IL
January 24, 2026; 7:00 p.m., ESPN+		at Bradley	W 85–70	11–10 (6–4)	Carver Arena (6,203); Peoria, IL
January 27, 2026; 7:00 p.m., ESPN+		Indiana State	W 76–74	12–10 (7–4)	Credit Union 1 Arena (1,440); Chicago, IL
January 31, 2026; 6:00 p.m., ESPN+		at Southern Illinois	W 68–66	13–10 (8–4)	Banterra Center (3,933); Carbondale, IL
February 3, 2026; 7:00 p.m., ESPN+		at Murray State	L 74–81	13–11 (8–5)	CFSB Center (4,840); Murray, KY
February 6, 2026; 8:00 p.m., ESPNU		Belmont	L 62–68	13–12 (8–6)	Credit Union 1 Arena (3,511); Chicago, IL
February 12, 2026; 6:30 p.m., ESPN+		at Drake	W 80–70	14–12 (9–6)	The Knapp Center (3,495); Des Moines, IA
February 15, 2026; 2:00 p.m., ESPN+		Illinois State	W 83–56	15–12 (10–6)	Credit Union 1 Arena (2,141); Chicago, IL
February 18, 2026; 7:00 p.m., ESPN+		at Evansville	W 84–46	16–12 (11–6)	Ford Center (4,215); Evansville, IN
February 21, 2026; 2:00 p.m., ESPN+		Valparaiso; Senior Day	L 67–71	16–13 (11–7)	Credit Union 1 Arena (2,247); Chicago, IL
February 24, 2026; 7:00 p.m., ESPN+		Bradley	W 93–86 ^{2OT}	17–13 (12–7)	Credit Union 1 Arena (1,847); Chicago, IL
March 1, 2026; 12:00 p.m., ESPN+		at Indiana State	L 63–79	17–14 (12–8)	Hulman Center (4,184); Terre Haute, IN
MVC Tournament
March 6, 2026*; 2:30 p.m., MVC TV/ESPN+	(5)	vs. (4) Murray State; Arch Madness Quarterfinal	W 92–79	18–14	Enterprise Center (8,068); St. Louis, MO
March 7, 2026*; 2:30 p.m., CBSSN	(5)	vs. (9) Drake; Arch Madness Semifinal	W 72–51	19–14	Enterprise Center (7,444); St. Louis, MO
March 8, 2026*; 11:00 a.m., CBS	(5)	vs. (6) Northern Iowa; Arch Madness Final	L 69–84	19–15	Enterprise Center (6,750); St. Louis, MO
NIT
March 18, 2026*; 10:00 p.m., ESPN2		at (2 AL) California; First round	L 73–91	19–16	Haas Pavilion (1,258); Berkeley, CA
*Non-conference game. ^{#}Rankings from AP Poll. (#) Tournament seedings in parentheses. AL=Albuquerque. All times are in Central Time Zone.
