= 2025–26 Valparaiso Beacons men's basketball team =

American college basketball season

2025–26 Valparaiso Beacons men's basketball
- Conference: Missouri Valley Conference
- Record: 18–15 (11–9 MVC)
- Head coach: Roger Powell Jr. (3rd season)
- Assistant coaches: Pat Baldwin; Matt Gordon; Jesse McClung
- Home arena: Athletics–Recreation Center

2025–26 Missouri Valley Conference men's basketball standings
	Conf.				Overall
Team	W		L	PCT	W		L	PCT
Belmont	16	–	4	.800	26	–	6	.813
Bradley	13	–	7	.650	21	–	13	.618
Illinois State	12	–	8	.600	23	–	13	.639
Murray State	12	–	8	.600	20	–	13	.606
UIC	12	–	8	.600	19	–	16	.543
Northern Iowa †	11	–	9	.550	23	–	13	.639
Valparaiso	11	–	9	.550	18	–	15	.545
Southern Illinois	10	–	10	.500	16	–	16	.500
Drake	6	–	14	.300	14	–	20	.412
Indiana State	4	–	16	.200	11	–	21	.344
Evansville	3	–	17	.150	7	–	25	.219
† 2026 MVC tournament winner

The 2025–26 Valparaiso Beacons men's basketball team represented Valparaiso University during the 2025–26 NCAA Division I men's basketball season. The Beacons, led by third-year head coach Roger Powell Jr., played their home games at the Athletics–Recreation Center in Valparaiso, Indiana as members of the Missouri Valley Conference (MVC). They finished the season 18–15, 11–9 in MVC play to finish in a tie for sixth place. As the No. 7 seed in the MVC tournament, they defeated Indiana State before losing to Bradley in the quarterfinals.

== Previous season ==
The Beacons finished the 2024–25 season 15–19, 6–14 in MVC play, to finish in 11th place. In the MVC Tournament, they upset UIC and Northern Iowa to advance the tournament semifinals. There they lost to Bradley.

== Roster ==
2025–26 Valparaiso Beacons men's basketball team
Players
Coaches

Pos.	#	Name	Height	Weight	Year	Previous school	Hometown
G	0	Rakim Chaney	6 ft 3 in (1.91 m)	185 lb (84 kg)	Fr	Auburn HS	Rockford, IL
G	1	Justus McNair	6 ft 3 in (1.91 m)	195 lb (88 kg)	So	Joliet West HS	Joliet, IL
G	3	Brody Whitaker (5Y)	6 ft 3 in (1.91 m)	195 lb (88 kg)	Sr	Indianapolis	Greencastle, IN
F	4	Jayden Watson	6 ft 8 in (2.03 m)	215 lb (98 kg)	RS Fr	Bloom HS	Chicago Heights, IL
G	5	Camden Webster	6 ft 3 in (1.91 m)	185 lb (84 kg)	Fr	Kankakee Valley HS	Wheatfield, IN
F	7	JT Pettigrew	6 ft 8 in (2.03 m)	215 lb (98 kg)	Fr	Bolingbrook HS	Lisle, IL
G	10	Mark Brown Jr.	6 ft 0 in (1.83 m)	190 lb (86 kg)	Jr	Snow College	South Phoenix, AZ
G	11	Issiah Barnes	6 ft 7 in (2.01 m)	210 lb (95 kg)	RS Sr	Tulsa	Chicago, IL
F	12	Owen Dease	6 ft 8 in (2.03 m)	200 lb (91 kg)	RS Sr	Texas A&M–Corpus Christi	Evansville, IN
F	13	Carter Hopoi	6 ft 11 in (2.11 m)	220 lb (100 kg)	Fr	Mount Maunganui College	Tauranga, New Zealand
C	15	Kobe Walker	6 ft 9 in (2.06 m)	270 lb (122 kg)	Fr	Normal Community HS	Normal, IL
G	20	Joe Vick	6 ft 3 in (1.91 m)	195 lb (88 kg)	Sr	Kouts HS	Kouts, IN
G	22	Kyonte Thomas (5Y)	6 ft 0 in (1.83 m)	180 lb (82 kg)	Sr	Southeastern	Chicago, IL
C	23	Shon Tupuola	6 ft 10 in (2.08 m)	245 lb (111 kg)	Jr	Saint Mary-of-the-Woods	Brownsburg, IN
G	32	Nick Lombardi	6 ft 0 in (1.83 m)	200 lb (91 kg)	So	Montini Catholic HS	Lisle, IL
C	35	Tucker Tornatta	6 ft 8 in (2.03 m)	235 lb (107 kg)	So	Indianapolis	Evansville, IN
G	44	Sader Servilus	6 ft 4 in (1.93 m)	215 lb (98 kg)	Fr	Fort Erie International Academy	Montreal, Quebec, Canada

Head coach

- Roger Powell Jr. (Illinois)

Assistant coach(es)

- Pat Baldwin (Northwestern)
- Matt Gordon (Illinois State)
- Jesse McClung (Ball State)

Legend

- (C) Team captain
- (S) Suspended
- (I) Ineligible
- (W) Walk-on
- (5Y) Fifth-year senior
- Injured
- Current redshirt

Roster
Last update: October 4, 2025

== Schedule and results ==
Date time, TV	Rank^{#}	Opponent^{#}	Result	Record	Site (attendance) city, state
Exhibition season
October 28, 2025*; 7:00 p.m.		Brescia	W 104–62		Athletics–Recreation Center; Valparaiso, IN
Non-conference season
November 4, 2025*; 7:00 p.m., ESPN+		Eastern Illinois; BBN United Tipoff Classic	W 66–63	1–0	Athletics–Recreation Center (1,095); Valparaiso, IN
November 7, 2025*; 7:00 p.m., SEC+		at No. 9 Kentucky; BBN United Tipoff Classic	L 59–107	1–1	Rupp Arena (20,016); Lexington, KY
November 12, 2025*; 7:00 p.m., ESPN+		Nicholls; BBN United Tipoff Classic	W 68–63	2–1	Athletics–Recreation Center (867); Valparaiso, IN
November 16, 2025*; 12:00 p.m., ESPN+		Bryant	W 68–50	3–1	Athletics–Recreation Center (980); Valparaiso, IN
November 19, 2025*; 6:00 p.m., ESPN+		at Cleveland State	W 90–75	4–1	Wolstein Center (2,017); Cleveland, OH
November 26, 2025*; 2:00 p.m., ESPN+		Southern Indiana	L 56–64	4–2	Athletics–Recreation Center (1,296); Valparaiso, IN
November 29, 2025*; 2:00 p.m., ESPN+		Western Michigan	W 84–55	5–2	Athletics–Recreation Center (1,107); Valparaiso, IN
December 2, 2025*; 7:00 p.m., ESPN+		at Marquette	L 72–75 ^{OT}	5–3	Fiserv Forum (13,486); Milwaukee, WI
December 6, 2025*; 2:00 p.m., ESPN+		Calumet–St. Joseph	W 98–58	6–3	Athletics–Recreation Center (1,023); Valparaiso, IN
December 13, 2025*; 2:00 p.m., ESPN+		UNC Wilmington	L 70–73	6–4	Athletics–Recreation Center (1,603); Valparaiso, IN
December 16, 2025*; 7:00 p.m., Peacock		at Northwestern	L 70–86	6–5	Welsh–Ryan Arena (4,525); Evanston, IL
Conference season
December 21, 2025; 1:00 p.m., ESPN+		Murray State	L 79–85	6–6 (0–1)	Athletics–Recreation Center (1,612); Valparaiso, IN
December 29, 2025; 7:00 p.m., ESPN+		at Northern Iowa	L 48–58	6–7 (0–2)	McLeod Center (3,558); Cedar Falls, IA
January 1, 2026; 2:00 p.m., ESPN+		at Southern Illinois	L 70–75	6–8 (0–3)	Banterra Center (5,758); Carbondale, IL
January 4, 2026; 2:00 p.m., ESPN+		UIC	W 66–59	7–8 (1–3)	Athletics–Recreation Center (1,494); Valparaiso, IN
January 7, 2026; 7:00 p.m., ESPN+		Illinois State	W 77–71	8–8 (2–3)	Athletics–Recreation Center (1,444); Valparaiso, IN
January 10, 2026; 3:00 p.m., ESPN+		at Murray State	L 79–92	8–9 (2–4)	CFSB Center (5,112); Murray, KY
January 13, 2026; 6:30 p.m., ESPN+		at Belmont	L 74–78	8–10 (2–5)	Curb Event Center (1,648); Nashville, TN
January 17, 2026; 2:00 p.m., ESPN+		Northern Iowa	W 54–44	9–10 (3–5)	Athletics–Recreation Center (1,863); Valparaiso, IN
January 21, 2026; 7:00 p.m., ESPN+		Southern Illinois	W 69–63	10–10 (4–5)	Athletics–Recreation Center (1,366); Valparaiso, IN
January 28, 2026; 7:00 p.m., ESPN+		Belmont	L 77–78	10–11 (4–6)	Athletics–Recreation Center (1,713); Valparaiso, IN
January 31, 2026; 12:00 p.m., ESPN+		at Indiana State	W 76–72 ^{OT}	11–11 (5–6)	Hulman Center (5,137); Terre Haute, IN
February 3, 2026; 7:00 p.m., ESPN+		at Bradley	L 65–72	11–12 (5–7)	Carver Arena (5,397); Peoria, IL
February 6, 2026; 7:00 p.m., ESPN+		Evansville	W 70–63 ^{OT}	12–12 (6–7)	Athletics–Recreation Center (1,488); Valparaiso, IN
February 9, 2026; 6:30 p.m., ESPN+		at Drake	W 81–76	13–12 (7–7)	The Knapp Center (3,078); Des Moines, IA
February 12, 2026; 6:00 p.m., Gray Media		at Illinois State	L 64–86	13–13 (7–8)	CEFCU Arena (3,607); Normal, IL
February 15, 2026; 1:00 p.m., ESPN+		Indiana State	W 76–75	14–13 (8–8)	Athletics–Recreation Center (2,065); Valparaiso, IN
February 18, 2026; 6:00 p.m., Gray Media		Bradley	W 79–72	15–13 (9–8)	Athletics–Recreation Center (1,636); Valparaiso, IN
February 21, 2026; 2:00 p.m., ESPN+		at UIC	W 71–67	16–13 (10–8)	Credit Union 1 Arena (2,247); Chicago, IL
February 25, 2026; 7:00 p.m., ESPN+		Drake; Senior Night	W 74–71	17–13 (11–8)	Athletics–Recreation Center (1,835); Valparaiso, IN
February 28, 2026; 3:00 p.m., ESPN+		at Evansville	L 79–80	17–14 (11–9)	Ford Center (3,982); Evansville, IN
Conference tournament
March 5, 2026*; 6:00 p.m., Gray Media	(7)	vs. (10) Indiana State; Arch Madness Opening Round	W 63–62	18–14	Enterprise Center (8,960); St. Louis, MO
March 6, 2026*; 6:00 p.m., Gray Media	(7)	vs. (2) Bradley; Arch Madness Quarterfinal	L 84–90 ^{2OT}	18–15	Enterprise Center (8,897); St. Louis, MO
*Non-conference game. ^{#}Rankings from AP poll. (#) Tournament seedings in parentheses. All times are in Central Time Zone.

== See also ==
- 2025-26 Valparaiso Beacons women's basketball team
