= 2025–26 Southern Illinois Salukis men's basketball team =

American college basketball season

2025–26 Southern Illinois Salukis men's basketball
- Conference: Missouri Valley Conference
- Record: 16–16 (10–10 MVC)
- Head coach: Scott Nagy (2nd season)
- Associate head coach: Steve Hawkins
- Assistant coaches: Jevon Mamon; Will Veasley; Tae Gibbs; Darreon Reddick
- Home arena: Banterra Center

2025–26 Missouri Valley Conference men's basketball standings
	Conf.				Overall
Team	W		L	PCT	W		L	PCT
Belmont	16	–	4	.800	26	–	6	.813
Bradley	13	–	7	.650	21	–	11	.656
Illinois State	12	–	8	.600	20	–	12	.625
Murray State	12	–	8	.600	20	–	12	.625
UIC	12	–	8	.600	18	–	14	.563
Northern Iowa	11	–	9	.550	21	–	12	.636
Valparaiso	11	–	9	.550	18	–	15	.545
Southern Illinois	10	–	10	.500	16	–	16	.500
Drake	6	–	14	.300	14	–	19	.424
Indiana State	4	–	16	.200	11	–	21	.344
Evansville	3	–	17	.150	7	–	25	.219
† 2026 MVC tournament winner As of March 6, 2026

The 2025–26 Southern Illinois Salukis men's basketball team represented Southern Illinois University Carbondale during the 2025–26 NCAA Division I men's basketball season. The Salukis were led by second-year head coach Scott Nagy, and played their home games at the Banterra Center in Carbondale, Illinois as members of the Missouri Valley Conference (MVC).

== Previous season ==
The Salukis finished the 2024–25 season 14–19, 8–12 in MVC play to finish in a three-way tie for eighth place. As the No. 8 seed in the MVC tournament, they beat Indiana State before losing to Drake in the quarterfinals.

== Roster ==
2025–26 Southern Illinois Salukis men's basketball team
Players
Coaches

Pos.	#	Name	Height	Weight	Year	Previous school	Hometown
F	0	Rolyns Aligbe	6 ft 9 in (2.06 m)	240 lb (109 kg)	So	Minnehaha Academy	Minneapolis, MN
G	2	Quel'Ron House	6 ft 0 in (1.83 m)	180 lb (82 kg)	So	Jacksonville State	Louisville, KY
G	3	Caden Hawkins	6 ft 0 in (1.83 m)	175 lb (79 kg)	Jr	John A. Logan	Carterville, IL
G	4	Davion Sykes	6 ft 6 in (1.98 m)	220 lb (100 kg)	Sr	Texas State	Duncanville, TX
G	5	Jalen Haynes	6 ft 4 in (1.93 m)	185 lb (84 kg)	Fr	Sunrise Christian Academy	Lewisville, TX
F	7	Daniel Pauliukonis	6 ft 9 in (2.06 m)	200 lb (91 kg)	Fr	Benet Academy	Chicago, IL
G	8	Prince Aligbe	6 ft 7 in (2.01 m)	235 lb (107 kg)	Sr	Seton Hall	Minneapolis, MN
G	9	Isaiah Stafford	6 ft 2 in (1.88 m)	185 lb (84 kg)	RS Sr	Valparaiso	Bolingbrook, IL
G	10	Damien Mayo Jr.	6 ft 3 in (1.91 m)	205 lb (93 kg)	Sr	Missouri State	St. Louis, MO
G	14	Luke Walsh	6 ft 2 in (1.88 m)	185 lb (84 kg)	Fr	St. John Vianney High School	St. Louis, MO
G	21	Drew Steffe	6 ft 5 in (1.96 m)	200 lb (91 kg)	RS So	Texas Tech	Frisco, TX
F	25	Jorge Moreno	6 ft 11 in (2.11 m)	270 lb (122 kg)	RS Sr	Lee College	Cananea, Mexico
C	33	Jaheem Webber	6 ft 10 in (2.08 m)	255 lb (116 kg)	RS Fr	Normal Community High School	Normal, IL
F	35	Max Pikaar	7 ft 0 in (2.13 m)	205 lb (93 kg)	So	Saint Louis	Leiden, Netherlands

Head coach

- Scott Nagy (Delta State)

Assistant coach(es)

- Steve Hawkins (USSA)
- Jevon Mamon (Barat College)
- Will Veasley (Butler)
- Tae Gibbs (Indiana University Southeast)
- Darreon Reddick (Tennessee State)

Legend

- (C) Team captain
- (S) Suspended
- (I) Ineligible
- (W) Walk-on
- Injured
- Current redshirt

Roster
Last update: October 16, 2025

== Schedule and results ==
Date time, TV	Rank^{#}	Opponent^{#}	Result	Record	Site (attendance) city, state
Exhibition Season
October 17, 2025*; 6:00 PM		Austin Peay	W 84–79		Banterra Center; Carbondale, IL
October 29, 2025*; 7:00 PM		at Lindenwood	W 86–76		The Hyland Arena; St. Charles, MO
Non-Conference Regular Season
November 3, 2025*; 7:00 PM, ESPN+		McKendree	W 83–42	1–0	Banterra Center (3,719); Carbondale, IL
November 7, 2025*; 7:00 PM, ESPN+		Kansas City; Charles Helleny Tip–Off Classic	W 101–78	2–0	Banterra Center (3,704); Carbondale, IL
November 12, 2025*; 9:00 PM, Mountain West Network		at Nevada	L 81–86 ^{OT}	2–1	Lawlor Events Center (7,001); Reno, NV
November 17, 2025*; 7:00 PM, SLN		at North Dakota State	L 85–92	2–2	Scheels Center (1,068); Fargo, ND
November 23, 2025*; 2:00 PM, PassThaBallLive		vs. Delaware; Jacksonville Classic	W 79–59	3–2	Adams–Jenkins Community; Sports & Music Complex (346); Jacksonville, FL
November 24, 2025*; 12:30 PM, PassThaBallLive		vs. UAB; Jacksonville Classic	L 73–81	3–3	Adams–Jenkins Community; Sports & Music Complex (246); Jacksonville, FL
November 26, 2025*; 7:00 PM, ESPN+		at Memphis	L 58–74	3–4	FedExForum (9,681); Memphis, TN
November 29, 2025*; 6:00 PM, ESPN+		Little Rock	W 74–65	4–4	Banterra Center (3,309); Carbondale, IL
December 3, 2025*; 6:00 PM, ESPN+		at High Point	W 86–84	5–4	Qubein Center (2,497); High Point, NC
December 10, 2025*; 7:00 PM, ESPN+		UT Martin	W 83–54	6–4	Banterra Center (4,021); Carbondale, IL
December 13, 2025*; 5:00 PM, ESPN+		at Richmond	L 84–93 ^{OT}	6–5	Robins Center (4,539); Richmond, VA
Conference Regular Season
December 18, 2025; 8:00 PM, MVC TV Network/ESPN+		Illinois State	L 68–75	6–6 (0–1)	Banterra Center (3,923); Carbondale, IL
December 21, 2025; 1:00 PM, ESPN+		at Bradley	L 69–73	6–7 (0–2)	Carver Arena (5,922); Peoria, IL
December 29, 2025; 6:00 PM, MVC TV Network/ESPN+		at Murray State	L 81–84	6–8 (0–3)	CFSB Center (5,058); Murray, KY
January 1, 2026; 2:00 PM, ESPN+		Valparaiso	W 75–50	7–8 (1–3)	Banterra Center (5,758); Carbondale, IL
January 4, 2026; 4:00 PM, ESPN+		at Belmont	W 68–67	8–8 (2–3)	Curb Event Center (2,502); Nashville, TN
January 7, 2026; 7:00 PM, ESPN+		at UIC	L 57–70	8–9 (2–4)	Credit Union 1 Arena (778); Chicago, IL
January 14, 2026; 7:00 PM, ESPN+		Drake	L 73–76	8–10 (2–5)	Banterra Center (4,033); Carbondale, IL
January 17, 2026; 6:00 PM, ESPN+		Belmont	L 68–73	8–11 (2–6)	Banterra Center (3,944); Carbondale, IL
January 21, 2026; 7:00 PM, ESPN+		at Valparaiso	L 63–69	8–12 (2–7)	Athletics–Recreation Center (1,366); Valparaiso, IN
January 25, 2026; 3:00 PM, ESPN+		at Evansville	postponed; reschedule date March 1, 2026		Ford Center; Evansville, IN
January 28, 2026; 6:00 PM, MVC TV Network/ESPN+		Northern Iowa	W 65–50	9–12 (3–7)	Banterra Center (3,670); Carbondale, IL
January 31, 2026; 6:00 PM, ESPN+		UIC	L 66–68	9–13 (3–8)	Banterra Center (3,933); Carbondale, IL
February 3, 2026; 6:00 PM, MVC TV Network/ESPN+		at Illinois State	W 54–50	10–13 (4–8)	CEFCU Arena (4,766); Normal, IL
February 6, 2026; 7:00 PM, ESPN+		Murray State	L 81–91	10–14 (4–9)	Banterra Center (5,234); Carbondale, IL
February 9, 2026; 6:00 PM, ESPN+		at Indiana State	W 80–65	11–14 (5–9)	Hulman Center (4,705); Terre Haute, IN
February 12, 2026; 7:00 PM, ESPN+		Evansville	W 86–60	12–14 (6–9)	Banterra Center (3,300); Carbondale, IL
February 15, 2026; 1:00 PM, ESPN+		Bradley	L 60–70	12–15 (6–10)	Banterra Center (3,804); Carbondale, IL
February 18, 2026; 6:30 PM, ESPN+		at Drake	W 66–61	13–15 (7–10)	The Knapp Center (3,152); Des Moines, IA
February 21, 2026; 5:00 PM, ESPN+		at Northern Iowa	W 59–57	14–15 (8–10)	McLeod Center (4,102); Cedar Falls, IA
February 25, 2026; 7:00 PM, ESPN+		Indiana State; Senior Night	W 66–55	15–15 (9–10)	Banterra Center (3,404); Carbondale, IL
March 1, 2026; 3:00 PM, ESPN+		at Evansville (Rescheduled from January 25, 2026)	W 81–67	16–15 (10–10)	Ford Center (3,484); Evansville, IN
Conference Tournament
March 5, 2026*; 3:30 PM, MVC TV Network/ESPN+	(8)	vs. (9) Drake; Arch Madness Opening Round	L 63–67	16–16	Enterprise Center (8,960); St. Louis, MO
*Non-conference game. ^{#}Rankings from AP poll. (#) Tournament seedings in parentheses. All times are in Central Time Zone.
