= 2025–26 Belmont Bruins men's basketball team =

American college basketball season

2025–26 Belmont Bruins men's basketball

Missouri Valley regular season champions Coconut Hoops (Royal Palm Division) champion
- Conference: Missouri Valley Conference
- Record: 26–6 (16–4 MVC)
- Head coach: Casey Alexander (7th season)
- Associate head coach: Brian Ayers
- Assistant coaches: Kerron Johnson; Luke Smith; J J Butler
- Home arena: Curb Event Center

2025–26 Missouri Valley Conference men's basketball standings
	Conf.				Overall
Team	W		L	PCT	W		L	PCT
Belmont	16	–	4	.800	26	–	6	.813
Bradley	13	–	7	.650	21	–	13	.618
Illinois State	12	–	8	.600	22	–	12	.647
Murray State	12	–	8	.600	20	–	13	.606
UIC	12	–	8	.600	19	–	16	.543
Northern Iowa †	11	–	9	.550	23	–	13	.639
Valparaiso	11	–	9	.550	18	–	15	.545
Southern Illinois	10	–	10	.500	16	–	16	.500
Drake	6	–	14	.300	14	–	19	.424
Indiana State	4	–	16	.200	11	–	21	.344
Evansville	3	–	17	.150	7	–	25	.219
† 2026 MVC tournament winner As of March 22, 2026

The 2025–26 Belmont Bruins men's basketball team represented Belmont University during the 2025–26 NCAA Division I men's basketball season. The Bruins, led by seventh-year head coach Casey Alexander, played their home games at the Curb Event Center in Nashville, Tennessee as a member of the Missouri Valley Conference. They finished the season 26–6, 16–4 in MVC play to win the regular season championship. They were upset in the quarterfinals of the MVC tournament by Drake.

On March 12, 2026, head coach Casey Alexander left the school to take the head coaching job with Kansas State. On March 18, the school announced that Duke assistant coach Evan Bradds would be the team's new head coach.

== Previous season ==
The Bruins finished the 2024–25 season 22–11, 13–7 in MVC play to finish in fourth place. In the MVC tournament, they defeated Illinois State in the quarterfinals, before falling to Drake in the semifinals.

== Roster ==
2025–26 Belmont Bruins men's basketball team
Players
Coaches

Pos.	#	Name	Height	Weight	Year	Hometown
G	0	Win Miller	6 ft 3 in (1.91 m)	190 lb (86 kg)	Jr	Vestavia Hills, Alabama
G	1	Nic McClain	6 ft 3 in (1.91 m)	200 lb (91 kg)	GS	Jennings, Florida
G	2	Jack Smiley	6 ft 2 in (1.88 m)	170 lb (77 kg)	Fr	Valparaiso, Indiana
G	3	Isaiah West	6 ft 2 in (1.88 m)	195 lb (88 kg)	Jr	Springfield, Tennessee
F	4	Aidan Noyes	6 ft 7 in (2.01 m)	200 lb (91 kg)	RS Sr	Cincinnati, Ohio
F	5	Eoin Dillon	6 ft 9 in (2.06 m)	220 lb (100 kg)	RS Fr	Peoria, Illinois
F	7	Graydon Lemke	6 ft 10 in (2.08 m)	210 lb (95 kg)	RS Fr	Las Vegas, Nevada
G	8	Tyler Lundblade	6 ft 5 in (1.96 m)	195 lb (88 kg)	GS	Dallas, Texas
G	10	Jabez Jenkins	6 ft 4 in (1.93 m)	200 lb (91 kg)	RS Fr	Covington, Georgia
F	11	Drew Scharnowski	6 ft 9 in (2.06 m)	230 lb (104 kg)	RS So	Burlington, Illinois
F	12	Brigham Rogers	6 ft 9 in (2.06 m)	240 lb (109 kg)	Jr	Woodstock, Georgia
G	13	Cooper Haynes	6 ft 2 in (1.88 m)	195 lb (88 kg)	RS Fr	Memphis, Tennessee
F	14	Sam Orme	6 ft 9 in (2.06 m)	225 lb (102 kg)	RS So	Carmel, Indiana
G	23	Jake Dykstra	6 ft 4 in (1.93 m)	200 lb (91 kg)	Sr	Nashville, Tennessee
G	24	Keith Robbins	6 ft 4 in (1.93 m)	180 lb (82 kg)	Sr	Milledgeville, Georgia

Head coach

- Casey Alexander (Belmont)

Assistant coach(es)

- Brian Ayers (Lipscomb)
- Kerron Johnson (Belmont)
- Luke Smith (Belmont)
- J J Butler (Lipscomb)

Legend

- (C) Team captain
- (S) Suspended
- (I) Ineligible
- (W) Walk-on
- Injured
- Current redshirt

Roster
Last update: October 26, 2025

== Schedule and results ==
Date time, TV	Rank^{#}	Opponent^{#}	Result	Record	Site (attendance) city, state
Exhibition season
October 27, 2025*; 6:30 p.m.		Tennessee Tech	W 74–70		Curb Event Center; Nashville, TN
Regular season
November 3, 2025*; 6:30 p.m., ESPN+		Air Force	W 79–63	1–0	Curb Event Center (1,715); Nashville, TN
November 8, 2025*; 7:00 p.m., ESPN+		Tennessee State	W 87–79	2–0	Curb Event Center (1,721); Nashville, TN
November 15, 2025*; 7:00 p.m., GEBN		at Oral Roberts	W 83–60	3–0	Mabee Center (3,467); Tulsa, OK
November 19, 2025*; 7:30 p.m., ESPN+		Lipscomb; Battle of the Boulevard	W 75–68	4–0	Curb Event Center (4,132); Nashville, TN
November 21, 2025*; 6:30 p.m., ESPN+		Fisk	W 96–49	5–0	Curb Event Center (1,122); Nashville, TN
November 24, 2025*; 12:30 p.m., FloCollege		vs. Saint Francis; Coconut Hoops Royal Palm Division semifinal	W 94–57	6–0	Alico Arena (212); Fort Myers, FL
November 26, 2025*; 12:30 p.m., FloCollege		vs. Toledo; Coconut Hoops Royal Palm Division final	W 87–69	7–0	Alico Arena (289); Fort Myers, FL
November 30, 2025*; 2:30 p.m., FloCollege		at Charleston	W 96–73	8–0	TD Arena (4,581); Charleston, SC
December 3, 2025*; 6:30 p.m., ESPN+		Richmond	L 76–84	8–1	Curb Event Center (1,405); Nashville, TN
December 7, 2025*; 3:30 p.m., ESPN+		at Middle Tennessee	W 83–62	9–1	Murphy Center (3,168); Murfreesboro, TN
December 13, 2025; 3:00 p.m., ESPN+		UIC	W 87–84	10–1 (1–0)	Curb Event Center (1,428); Nashville, TN
December 16, 2025; 6:00 p.m., Gray		at Evansville	W 83–78	11–1 (2–0)	Ford Center (4,039); Evansville, IN
December 19, 2025*; 8:00 p.m., ESPN+		at UC Irvine	W 84–58	12–1	Bren Events Center (1,853); Irvine, CA
December 29, 2025; 6:00 p.m., ESPN+		at Indiana State	L 80–81 ^{OT}	12–2 (2–1)	Hulman Center (4,439); Terre Haute, IN
January 1, 2026; 6:00 p.m., Gray		Bradley	W 88–78	13–2 (3–1)	Curb Event Center (1,447); Nashville, TN
January 4, 2026; 4:00 p.m., ESPN+		Southern Illinois	L 67–68	13–3 (3–2)	Curb Event Center (2,502); Nashville, TN
January 7, 2026; 6:00 p.m., ESPN+		at Northern Iowa	W 78–65	14–3 (4–2)	McLeod Center (3,626); Cedar Falls, IA
January 10, 2026; 5:00 p.m., ESPN+		at Drake	W 78–76	15–3 (5–2)	The Knapp Center (3,657); Des Moines, IA
January 13, 2026; 6:30 p.m., ESPN+		Valparaiso	W 78–74	16–3 (6–2)	Curb Event Center (1,648); Nashville, TN
January 17, 2026; 6:00 p.m., ESPN+		at Southern Illinois	W 73–68	17–3 (7–2)	Banterra Center (3,944); Carbondale, IL
January 24, 2026 (Note: Rescheduled from January 25 (2:00 p.m.) due to the North American winter storm of January, 2026); 12:00 p.m., ESPN+		Illinois State	W 80–69	18–3 (8–2)	Curb Event Center (764); Nashville, TN
January 28, 2026; 7:00 p.m., ESPN+		at Valparaiso	W 78–77	19–3 (9–2)	Athletics–Recreation Center (1,713); Valparaiso, IN
January 31, 2026; 7:00 p.m., CBSSN		Murray State	W 103–86	20–3 (10–2)	Curb Event Center (3,718); Nashville, TN
February 3, 2026; 8:00 p.m., Gray		Drake	W 103–90	21–3 (11–2)	Curb Event Center (1,501); Nashville, TN
February 6, 2026; 8:00 p.m., ESPNU		at UIC	W 68–62	22–3 (12–2)	Credit Union 1 Arena (3,511); Chicago, IL
February 9, 2026; 7:00 p.m., ESPN+		at Bradley	L 84–95 ^{OT}	22–4 (12–3)	Carver Arena (5,727); Peoria, IL
February 12, 2026; 8:00 p.m., Gray		Northern Iowa	W 91–86	23–4 (13–3)	Curb Event Center (1,601); Nashville, TN
February 15, 2026; 5:00 p.m., ESPN2		at Murray State	W 87–70	24–4 (14–3)	CFSB Center (5,756); Murray, KY
February 21, 2026; 7:00 p.m., ESPN+		Indiana State; Homecoming / Senior Night	W 87–70	25–4 (15–3)	Curb Event Center (3,644); Nashville, TN
February 25, 2026; 6:30 p.m., ESPN+		Evansville	W 98–64	26–4 (16–3)	Curb Event Center (1,851); Nashville, TN
March 1, 2026; 4:00 p.m., CBSSN		at Illinois State	L 74–81	26–5 (16–4)	CEFCU Arena (6,149); Normal, IL
Conference tournament
March 6, 2026*; 12:00 p.m., Gray	(1)	vs. (9) Drake; Arch Madness Quarterfinal	L 79–100	26–6	Enterprise Center (8,068); St. Louis, MO
*Non-conference game. ^{#}Rankings from AP Poll. (#) Tournament seedings in parentheses. All times are in Central Time Zone.
