= 2025–26 Bradley Braves men's basketball team =

American college basketball season

2025–26 Bradley Braves men's basketball

NIT, First round
- Conference: Missouri Valley Conference
- Record: 21–13 (13–7 MVC)
- Head coach: Brian Wardle (10th season)
- Assistant coaches: Mike Black; Brian Jones; Bobby Suarez; Allan Hanson
- Home arena: Carver Arena

2025–26 Missouri Valley Conference men's basketball standings
	Conf.				Overall
Team	W		L	PCT	W		L	PCT
Belmont	16	–	4	.800	26	–	6	.813
Bradley	13	–	7	.650	21	–	13	.618
Illinois State	12	–	8	.600	23	–	13	.639
Murray State	12	–	8	.600	20	–	13	.606
UIC	12	–	8	.600	19	–	16	.543
Northern Iowa †	11	–	9	.550	23	–	13	.639
Valparaiso	11	–	9	.550	18	–	15	.545
Southern Illinois	10	–	10	.500	16	–	16	.500
Drake	6	–	14	.300	14	–	20	.412
Indiana State	4	–	16	.200	11	–	21	.344
Evansville	3	–	17	.150	7	–	25	.219
† 2026 MVC tournament winner

The 2025–26 Bradley Braves men's basketball team represented Bradley University during the 2025–26 NCAA Division I men's basketball season. The Braves, led by 10th-year head coach Brian Wardle, played their home games at the Carver Arena in Peoria, Illinois as members of the Missouri Valley Conference. They finished the season 21–13, 13–7 in MVC play to finish in second place. They defeated Valparaiso in the quarterfinal of the MVC tournament before being upset by Northern Iowa. They received a bid to the National Invitation Tournament where they lost to Dayton in the first round.

== Previous season ==
The Braves finished the 2024–25 season 28–9, 15–5 in MVC play to finish in second place. In the MVC tournament, they defeated Murray State and Valparaiso to advance to the championship game where they lost to Drake. They received a bid to the National Invitation Tournament as a No. 3 seed. There they defeated North Alabama and George Washington before losing to eventual champion Chattanooga.

== Roster ==
2025–26 Bradley Braves men's basketball team
Players
Coaches

Pos.	#	Name	Height	Weight	Year	Previous school	Hometown
G	0	Demarion Burch	6 ft 4 in (1.93 m)	200 lb (91 kg)	Jr	Milwaukee-Hamilton HS	Milwaukee, Wisconsin
G/F	1	Dietrich Richardson	6 ft 7 in (2.01 m)	185 lb (84 kg)	Fr	Peoria Manual HS	Peoria, Illinois
G	3	Alex Huibregtse	6 ft 4 in (1.93 m)	200 lb (91 kg)	GS	Wright State	Grafton, Wisconsin
F	4	Corey Thomas	6 ft 10 in (2.08 m)	210 lb (95 kg)	Sr	Cowley CC	Buford, Georgia
G	5	Matthew Zobrist	6 ft 5 in (1.96 m)	205 lb (93 kg)	Fr	Metamora Township HS	Metamora, Illinois
G	7	Montana Wheeler	5 ft 10 in (1.78 m)	170 lb (77 kg)	Fr	Xavier Academy	Houston, Texas
G	9	Jackson Seastrunk	6 ft 5 in (1.96 m)	200 lb (91 kg)	Fr	Xavier Academy	Fannett, Texas
G/F	10	Timoty van der Knaap	6 ft 8 in (2.03 m)	195 lb (88 kg)	So	Orange1 Bassano	Bassano del Grappa, Italy
C	12	Kai Yu	7 ft 0 in (2.13 m)	240 lb (109 kg)	RS So	Liberty	Zhuhai, China
F	13	Handy Toussaint III	6 ft 8 in (2.03 m)	230 lb (104 kg)	Jr	Weatherford	Port-au-Prince, Haiti
C	14	Ahmet Jonovic	7 ft 1 in (2.16 m)	250 lb (113 kg)	Sr	OKK Beograd	Prijepolje, Serbia
C	17	Gustavo Guimarães	6 ft 11 in (2.11 m)	225 lb (102 kg)	Fr	Riviera Prep	São Paulo, Brazil
F	21	AJ Smith	6 ft 7 in (2.01 m)	220 lb (100 kg)	Sr	James Madison	Edwardsville, Illinois
G	22	Jaquan Johnson	5 ft 10 in (1.78 m)	195 lb (88 kg)	So	Pius XI HS	Milwaukee, Wisconsin
G	23	Gus Rugaard	6 ft 1 in (1.85 m)	180 lb (82 kg)	So	Morton HS	Morton, Illinois

Head coach

- Brian Wardle (Marquette)

Assistant coach(es)

- Mike Black (Albany)
- Brian Jones (Northern Iowa)
- Bobby Suarez (Florida Gulf Coast)
- Allan Hanson (Milwaukee)

Legend

- (C) Team captain
- (S) Suspended
- (I) Ineligible
- (W) Walk-on
- Injured
- Current redshirt

Roster
Last update: October 10, 2025

== Schedule and results ==
Date time, TV	Rank^{#}	Opponent^{#}	Result	Record	Site (attendance) city, state
Exhibition season
October 11, 2025*; 6:00 p.m.		at Green Bay	W 83–78		Kress Events Center; Green Bay, WI
Non-conference regular season
November 3, 2025*; 10:00 a.m., YouTube		vs. St. Bonaventure; Field of 68 Opening Day Marathon	L 63–69	0–1	Rock Hill Sports & Event Center (749); Rock Hill, SC
November 8, 2025*; 7:00 p.m., ESPN+		Central Michigan	W 85–54	1–1	Carver Arena (5,814); Peoria, IL
November 12, 2025*; 7:30 p.m., ESPN+		UT Martin	L 67–78	1–2	Carver Arena (5,096); Peoria, IL
November 15, 2025*; 9:00 p.m., ESPN+		at San Francisco	L 64–75	1–3	War Memorial Gymnaisum (2,182); San Francisco, CA
November 19, 2025*; 7:00 p.m., ESPN+		UMass Lowell	W 87–77	2–3	Carver Arena (4,932); Peoria, IL
November 24, 2025*; 6:00 p.m., ESPNU		vs. Princeton; Terry's Chocolate ESPN Events Invitational (Adventure Bracket) quarterfinal	W 88–64	3–3	State Farm Field House (1,076); Kissimmee, FL
November 25, 2025*; 4:00 p.m., ESPN2		vs. UC San Diego; Terry's Chocolate ESPN Events Invitational (Adventure Bracket) semifinal	L 77–87	3–4	State Farm Field House (710); Kissimmee, FL
November 26, 2025*; 1:30 p.m., ESPNU		vs. Liberty; Terry's Chocolate ESPN Events Invitational (Adventure Bracket) third place	W 74–64	4–4	State Farm Field House (547); Kissimmee, FL
December 2, 2025*; 7:00 p.m., ESPN+		Washington State	W 64–60	5–4	Carver Arena (4,919); Peoria, IL
December 6, 2025*; 7:00 p.m., ESPN+		Northern Illinois	W 84–55	6–4	Carver Arena (5,750); Peoria, IL
December 14, 2025*; 1:00 p.m., ESPN+		North Central	W 86–53	7–4	Renaissance Coliseum (2,585); Peoria, IL
Conference regular season
December 18, 2025; 6:00 p.m., Gray Media		at Indiana State	W 108–99 ^{3OT}	8–4 (1–0)	Hulman Center (4,719); Terre Haute, IN
December 21, 2025; 1:00 p.m., ESPN+		Southern Illinois	W 73–69	9–4 (2–0)	Carver Arena (5,922); Peoria, IL
December 29, 2025; 7:00 p.m., ESPN+		Evansville	W 76–68	10–4 (3–0)	Carver Arena (5,917); Peoria, IL
January 1, 2026; 6:00 p.m., Gray Media		at Belmont	L 78–88	10–5 (3–1)	Curb Event Center (1,447); Nashville, TN
January 4, 2026; 4:00 p.m., ESPN2		at Murray State	L 66–86	10–6 (3–2)	CFSB Center (5,165); Murray, KY
January 7, 2026; 8:00 p.m., Gray Media		Drake	W 93–66	11–6 (4–2)	Carver Arena (5,187); Peoria, IL
January 10, 2026; 5:00 p.m., ESPNU		Northern Iowa	W 75–69	12–6 (5–2)	Carver Arena (6,004); Peoria, IL
January 13, 2026; 7:00 p.m., ESPN+		at Evansville	W 94–90 ^{OT}	13–6 (6–2)	Ford Center (4,089); Evansville, IN
January 17, 2026; 1:00 p.m., ESPN2		at Illinois State; Battle for 74	L 62–88	13–7 (6–3)	CEFCU Arena (7,549); Normal, IL
January 21, 2026; 6:00 p.m., Gray Media		Indiana State	W 75–68	14–7 (7–3)	Carver Arena (5,327); Peoria, IL
January 24, 2026; 7:00 p.m., ESPN+		UIC	L 70–85	14–8 (7–4)	Carver Arena (6,209); Peoria, IL
January 31, 2026; 5:00 p.m., CBSSN		at Drake	W 87–73	15–8 (8–4)	The Knapp Center (4,342); Des Moines, IA
February 3, 2026; 7:00 p.m., ESPN+		Valparaiso	W 72–65	16–8 (9–4)	Carver Arena (5,397); Peoria, IL
February 6, 2026; 7:00 p.m., CBSSN		at Northern Iowa	L 49–61	16–9 (9–5)	McLeod Center (4,186); Cedar Falls, IA
February 9, 2026; 7:00 p.m., ESPN+		Belmont	W 95–84 ^{OT}	17–9 (10–5)	Carver Arena (5,727); Peoria, IL
February 15, 2026; 1:00 p.m., ESPN+		at Southern Illinois	W 70–60	18–9 (11–5)	Banterra Center (3,804); Carbondale, IL
February 18, 2026; 6:00 p.m., Gray Media		at Valparaiso	L 72–79	18–10 (11–6)	Athletics–Recreation Center (1,636); Valparaiso, IN
February 21, 2026; 7:00 p.m., ESPN2		Illinois State; Battle for 74	W 74–60	19–10 (12–6)	Carver Arena (10,542); Peoria, IL
February 24, 2026; 7:00 p.m., ESPN+		at UIC	L 86–93 ^{2OT}	19–11 (12–7)	Credit Union 1 Arena (1,847); Chicago, IL
March 1, 2026; 1:00 p.m., ESPN2		Murray State; Senior Day	W 87–78	20–11 (13–7)	Carver Arena (7,525); Peoria, IL
Conference tournament
March 6, 2026*; 6:00 p.m., Gray Media	(2)	vs. (7) Valparaiso; Arch Madness Quarterfinal	W 90–84 ^{2OT}	21–11	Enterprise Center (8,897); St. Louis, MO
March 7, 2026*; 5:00 p.m., CBSSN	(2)	vs. (6) Northern Iowa; Arch Madness Semifinal	L 69–73	21–12	Enterprise Center (7,444); St. Louis, MO
NIT
March 18, 2026*; 8:00 p.m., ESPNU		(2 WS) Dayton; First round	L 66–80	21–13	Carver Arena (Note: Dayton traveled to Peoria, Illinois to play an away game due to the NCAA Division I Men's Basketball Tournament First Four taking place at UD Arena.) (2,436); Peoria, IL
*Non-conference game. ^{#}Rankings from AP Poll. (#) Tournament seedings in parentheses. WS=Winston-Salem. All times are in Central Time Zone.
