= 2025–26 Evansville Purple Aces men's basketball team =

American college basketball season

2025–26 Evansville Purple Aces men's basketball
- Conference: Missouri Valley Conference
- Record: 7–25 (3–17 MVC)
- Head coach: David Ragland (4th season)
- Associate head coach: Craig Snow
- Assistant coaches: George Swanson; Peter Funk; D J Balentine; Sammy Dowd
- Home arena: Ford Center

2025–26 Missouri Valley Conference men's basketball standings
	Conf.				Overall
Team	W		L	PCT	W		L	PCT
Belmont	16	–	4	.800	26	–	6	.813
Bradley	13	–	7	.650	21	–	13	.618
Illinois State	12	–	8	.600	23	–	13	.639
Murray State	12	–	8	.600	20	–	13	.606
UIC	12	–	8	.600	19	–	16	.543
Northern Iowa †	11	–	9	.550	23	–	13	.639
Valparaiso	11	–	9	.550	18	–	15	.545
Southern Illinois	10	–	10	.500	16	–	16	.500
Drake	6	–	14	.300	14	–	19	.424
Indiana State	4	–	16	.200	11	–	21	.344
Evansville	3	–	17	.150	7	–	25	.219
† 2026 MVC tournament winner

The 2025–26 Evansville Purple Aces men's basketball team represented the University of Evansville during the 2025–26 NCAA Division I men's basketball season. The Purple Aces, led by fourth-year head coach David Ragland, played their home games at the Ford Center in Evansville, Indiana as members of the Missouri Valley Conference (MVC).

== Previous season ==
The Purple Aces finished the 2024–25 season 11–21, 8–12 in MVC play, to finish in tenth place. They were defeated in the first round of the MVC tournament by Murray State.

== Roster ==
2025–26 Evansville Purple Aces men's basketball team
Players
Coaches

Pos.	#	Name	Height	Weight	Year	Previous school	Hometown
G	0	Bryce Quinet	6 ft 3 in (1.91 m)	—	Fr	Notre Dame Prep	Scottsdale, AZ
G	1	Keishon Porter	6 ft 5 in (1.96 m)	195 lb (88 kg)	GS	NC Central	Pinetops, NC
F	2	James Dyson-Merwe	6 ft 11 in (2.11 m)	—	Fr	BA Centre for Excellence	Sydney, Australia
F	5	Marlon Barnes Jr.	6 ft 6 in (1.98 m)	190 lb (86 kg)	RS So	Pittsburgh	Cleveland, OH
G	6	Leif Moeller	6 ft 7 in (2.01 m)	—	Fr	Rist Wedel	Berlin, Germany
G	9	Kaia Berridge	6 ft 4 in (1.93 m)	—	So	Archbishop Riordan HS	Whangārei, New Zealand
F	11	Joshua Hughes	6 ft 10 in (2.08 m)	—	Jr	BA Centre of Excellence	Brisbane, Australia
G	12	Alex Hemenway	6 ft 4 in (1.93 m)	190 lb (86 kg)	GS	Vanderbilt	Newburgh, IN
F	21	A J Casey	6 ft 9 in (2.06 m)	—	Sr	Saint Louis	Chicago, IL
F	22	Connor Turnbull	6 ft 10 in (2.08 m)	225 lb (102 kg)	Sr	Butler	St. Paul, MO
F	32	Dakota Candler	6 ft 5 in (1.96 m)	—	Jr	South Knox HS	Vincennes, IN
G	33	Aaron Gutman	6 ft 7 in (2.01 m)	—	Fr	Walton-Verona HS	Walton, KY
G	40	Weston Aigner	6 ft 3 in (1.91 m)	—	Jr	Castle HS	Newburgh, IN
F	45	Trent Hundley	6 ft 6 in (1.98 m)	—	Sr	Rio Grande	Mount Orab, OH

Head coach

- David Ragland (Evansville)

Assistant coach(es)

- Craig Snow (Evansville)
- George Swanson (Northwest)
- Peter Funk (Valparaiso)
- D J Balentine (Evansville)
- Sammy Dowd (Idaho State)

Legend

- (C) Team captain
- (S) Suspended
- (I) Ineligible
- (W) Walk-on
- Injured
- Current redshirt

Roster
Last update: October 24, 2025

== Schedule and results ==
Date time, TV	Rank^{#}	Opponent^{#}	Result	Record	High points	High rebounds	High assists	Site (attendance) city, state
Exhibition Season
October 25, 2025*; 1:00 p.m.		Henderson State	W 90–74		22 – Porter	11 – Casey	7 – Hughes	Ford Center (3,409); Evansville, IN
Non-Conference Regular Season
November 4, 2025*; 5:30 p.m., BTN		at Purdue	L 51–82	0–1	15 – Hughes	11 – Hughes	3 – Moeller	Mackey Arena (14,876); West Lafayette, IN
November 7, 2025*; 11:00 a.m., ESPN+		Calumet–St. Joseph	W 92–50	1–1	21 – Hemenway	7 – Dyson–Merwe	8 – Moeller	Ford Center (5,561); Evansville, IN
November 9, 2025*; 3:00 p.m., ESPN+		Oakland City	W 76–47	2–1	14 – Turnbull	7 – Moeller	7 – Moeller	Ford Center (4,538); Evansville, IN
November 12, 2025*; 7:00 p.m., ESPN+		Middle Tennessee	L 72–77	2–2	16 – Turnbull	7 – Hughes	5 – Moeller	Ford Center (4,123); Evansville, IN
November 18, 2025*; 7:00 p.m., ESPN+		UT Arlington	L 76–84	2–3	20 – Turnbull	5 – Turnbull	6 – Moeller	Ford Center (4,312); Evansville, IN
November 21, 2025*; 7:00 p.m., ESPN+		vs. Oregon State; Paradise Jam Opening Round	W 73–69	3–3	16 – Hughes	12 – Hughes	3 – Quinet	UVI Center (1,012); Saint Thomas, USVI
November 23, 2025*; 7:00 p.m., ESPN+		vs. Akron; Paradise Jam Semifinal	L 59–97	3–4	13 – Casey	8 – Casey	2 – Casey	UVI Center (1,924); Saint Thomas, USVI
November 24, 2025*; 4:30 p.m., ESPN+		vs. Charleston; Paradise Jam Third Place	L 59–78	3–5	18 – Turnbull	8 – Turnbull	2 – Turnbull	UVI Center; Saint Thomas, USVI
December 3, 2025*; 7:00 p.m., ESPN+		Ball State	W 64–52	4–5	21 – Turnbull	11 – Casey	5 – Quinet	Ford Center (4,186); Evansville, IN
December 6, 2025*; 3:00 p.m., ESPN+		at Western Kentucky	L 79–80	4–6	21 – Moeller	8 – Turnbull	5 – Porter	E.A. Diddle Arena (3,247); Bowling Green, KY
December 13, 2025*; 1:00 p.m., ACCN		at Notre Dame	L 58–82	4–7	17 – Turnbull	9 – Turnbull	3 – Moeller	Purcell Pavilion (4,323); South Bend, IN
Conference Regular Season
December 16, 2025; 6:00 p.m., Gray Media/ESPN+		Belmont	L 78–83	4–8 (0–1)	20 – Hundley	9 – Dyson–Merwe	2 – Quinet	Ford Center (4,039); Evansville, IN
December 21, 2025; 3:00 p.m., ESPN+		Drake	L 65–66	4–9 (0–2)	20 – Turnbull	15 – Turnbull	3 – Moeller	Ford Center (4,207); Evansville, IN
December 29, 2025; 7:00 p.m., ESPN+		at Bradley	L 68–76	4–10 (0–3)	21 – Casey	7 – Tied	4 – Quinet	Carver Arena (5,917); Peoria, IL
January 1, 2026; 2:00 p.m., ESPN+		at Illinois State	L 47–73	4–11 (0–4)	13 – Quinet	7 – Casey	2 – Tied	CEFCU Arena (5,216); Normal, IL
January 4, 2026; 3:00 p.m., ESPN+		Northern Iowa	L 48–62	4–12 (0–5)	17 – Casey	5 – Tied	8 – Moeller	Ford Center (3,717); Evansville, IN
January 7, 2026; 7:00 p.m., ESPN+		Murray State	L 69–79	4–13 (0–6)	24 – Casey	6 – Dyson–Merwe	5 – Moeller	Ford Center (4,017); Evansville, IN
January 10, 2026; 12:00 p.m., ESPN+		at Indiana State	W 72–69	5–13 (1–6)	17 – Tied	8 – Moeller	8 – Moeller	Hulman Center (4,782); Terre Haute, IN
January 13, 2026; 7:00 p.m., ESPN+		Bradley	L 90–94 ^{OT}	5–14 (1–7)	26 – Moeller	6 – Tied	6 – Moeller	Ford Center (4,089); Evansville, IN
January 20, 2026; 7:00 p.m., Marquee/ESPN+		UIC	L 49–76	5–15 (1–8)	16 – Hughes	6 – Hughes	3 – Tied	Credit Union 1 Arena (663); Chicago, IL
January 25, 2026; 3:00 p.m., ESPN+		Southern Illinois	Postponed due to state of emergency in Vanderburgh County; reschedule date of March 1, 2026					Ford Center; Evansville, IN
January 28, 2026; 6:30 p.m., ESPN+		at Drake	L 78–82	5–16 (1–9)	20 – Moeller	7 – Moeller	7 – Moeller	The Knapp Center (3,441); Des Moines, IA
January 31, 2026; 3:00 p.m., ESPN+		at Northern Iowa	L 55–71	5–17 (1–10)	17 – Casey	11 – Casey	3 – Hemenway	McLeod Center (4,136); Cedar Falls, IA
February 3, 2026; 7:00 p.m., ESPN+		Indiana State	L 63–84	5–18 (1–11)	22 – Moeller	5 – Casey	4 – Moeller	Ford Center (3,805); Evansville, IN
February 6, 2026; 7:00 p.m., ESPN+		at Valparaiso	L 63–70 ^{OT}	5–19 (1–12)	26 – Moeller	7 – Casey	5 – Tied	Athletics–Recreation Center (1,488); Valparaiso, IN
February 9, 2026; 7:00 p.m., ESPN+		Illinois State	W 88–80	6–19 (2–12)	28 – Casey	10 – Moeller	8 – Moeller	Ford Center (3,059); Evansville, IN
February 12, 2026; 7:00 p.m., ESPN+		at Southern Illinois	L 60–86	6–20 (2–13)	20 – Quinet	9 – Casey	5 – Casey	Banterra Center (3,300); Carbondale, IL
February 18, 2026; 7:00 p.m., ESPN+		UIC	L 46–84	6–21 (2–14)	12 – Hundley	6 – Hughes	4 – Quinet	Ford Center (4,215); Evansville, IN
February 21, 2026; 3:00 p.m., ESPN+		at Murray State	L 73–88	6–22 (2–15)	14 – Turnbull	7 – Moeller	7 – Moeller	CFSB Center (5,302); Murray, KY
February 25, 2026; 6:30 p.m., ESPN+		at Belmont	L 64–98	6–23 (2–16)	21 – Casey	7 – Casey	5 – Casey	Curb Event Center (1,851); Nashville, TN
February 28, 2026; 3:00 p.m., ESPN+		Valparaiso; Senior Day	W 80–79	7–23 (3–16)	37 – Casey	11 – Casey	11 – Moeller	Ford Center (3,982); Evansville, IN
March 1, 2026; 3:00 p.m., ESPN+		Southern Illinois (Rescheduled from January 25)	L 67–81	7–24 (3–17)	16 – Tied	8 – Casey	7 – Quinet	Ford Center (3,484); Evansville, IN
Conference Tournament
March 5, 2026*; 8:30 p.m., Gray Media/ESPN+	(11)	vs. (6) Northern Iowa; Arch Madness Opening Round	L 59–68	7−25	23 – Casey	10 – Casey	3 – Tied	Enterprise Center (8,960); St. Louis, MO
*Non-conference game. ^{#}Rankings from AP poll. (#) Tournament seedings in parentheses. All times are in Central Time Zone.
