= 2025–26 Murray State Racers men's basketball team =

American college basketball season

2025–26 Murray State Racers men's basketball

NIT, First round
- Conference: Missouri Valley Conference
- Record: 20–13 (12–8 MVC)
- Head coach: Ryan Miller (1st season)
- Associate head coach: Brendan Mullins
- Assistant coaches: Jordan VerHulst; Mardracus Wade; Jahenns Manigat; Cullen Neal
- Home arena: CFSB Center

2025–26 Missouri Valley Conference men's basketball standings
	Conf.				Overall
Team	W		L	PCT	W		L	PCT
Belmont	16	–	4	.800	26	–	6	.813
Bradley	13	–	7	.650	21	–	13	.618
Illinois State	12	–	8	.600	23	–	13	.639
Murray State	12	–	8	.600	20	–	13	.606
UIC	12	–	8	.600	19	–	16	.543
Northern Iowa †	11	–	9	.550	23	–	13	.639
Valparaiso	11	–	9	.550	18	–	15	.545
Southern Illinois	10	–	10	.500	16	–	16	.500
Drake	6	–	14	.300	14	–	20	.412
Indiana State	4	–	16	.200	11	–	21	.344
Evansville	3	–	17	.150	7	–	25	.219
† 2026 MVC tournament winner

The 2025–26 Murray State Racers men's basketball team represented Murray State University during the 2025–26 NCAA Division I men's basketball season. The Racers, led by first-year head coach Ryan Miller, played their home games at the CFSB Center in Murray, Kentucky as members of the Missouri Valley Conference. They finished the season 20–13, 12–8 in MVC play to finish in a tie for third place. As the No. 4 seed in the MVC tournament, they were upset by UIC in the quarterfinals. They received an at-large bid to the National Invitational Tournament where they lost in the first round to Nevada.

== Previous season ==
The Racers finished the 2024–25 season 16–17, 9–11 in MVC play to finish in seventh place. In the MVC tournament, they defeated Evansville in the opening round, before falling to Bradley in the quarterfinals.

== Roster ==
2025–26 Murray State Racers men's basketball team
Players
Coaches

Pos.	#	Name	Height	Weight	Year	Previous school	Hometown
G/F	2	Mathis Courbon	6 ft 6 in (1.98 m)	190 lb (86 kg)	Fr	Lycee Albert Thomas HS	Lyon, France
G	4	Tristian Ford	6 ft 3 in (1.91 m)	164 lb (74 kg)	Fr	Chicago Prep Academy	Rockford, Illinois
F	6	Brock Vice	6 ft 10 in (2.08 m)	238 lb (108 kg)	So	North Texas	Memphis, Tennessee
G	7	Ben Shtolzberg	6 ft 4 in (1.93 m)	195 lb (88 kg)	Sr	UC Santa Barbara	Northridge, California
F	8	JJ Traynor	6 ft 9 in (2.06 m)	210 lb (95 kg)	Sr	DePaul	Bardstown, Kentucky
G	9	Layne Taylor	5 ft 11 in (1.8 m)	184 lb (83 kg)	So	Central Arkansas	Farmington, Arkansas
G	10	KJ Tenner	6 ft 0 in (1.83 m)	166 lb (75 kg)	So	West Virginia	Memphis, Tennessee
C	11	Dylan Anderson	7 ft 0 in (2.13 m)	235 lb (107 kg)	Jr	Boise State	Chandler, Arizona
F	13	Mason Miller	6 ft 9 in (2.06 m)	190 lb (86 kg)	Sr	Creighton	Germantown, Tennessee
G/F	14	Lachlan Crate	6 ft 8 in (2.03 m)	215 lb (98 kg)	Fr	Feilding HS	Feilding, New Zealand
G	22	Javon Jackson	6 ft 3 in (1.91 m)	190 lb (86 kg)	Sr	UIC	Houston, Texas
G	25	Dillon Butler	6 ft 3 in (1.91 m)	192 lb (87 kg)	Fr	Tipton-Rosemark Academy	Memphis, Tennessee
C	33	Fred King	6 ft 9 in (2.06 m)	267 lb (121 kg)	Sr	Creighton	Mangrove Cay, Bahamas
G	34	Brayden Shorter	6 ft 5 in (1.96 m)	210 lb (95 kg)	Jr	Washburn	Springfield, Missouri
G/F	77	Roman Domon	6 ft 9 in (2.06 m)	225 lb (102 kg)	Fr	BCM Gravelines-Dunkerque	Dreuil-lès-Amiens, France

Head coach

- Ryan Miller (Northern State)

Assistant coach(es)

- Brendan Mullins (Saint Michael's)
- Jordan VerHulst (Grand Valley State)
- Mardracus Wade (Arkansas)
- Jahenns Manigat (Creighton)
- Cullen Neal (New Mexico)

Legend

- (C) Team captain
- (S) Suspended
- (I) Ineligible
- (W) Walk-on
- Injured
- Current redshirt

Roster
Last update: October 17, 2025

== Schedule and results ==
Date time, TV	Rank^{#}	Opponent^{#}	Result	Record	Site (attendance) city, state
Exhibition season
October 18, 2025*; 1:00 p.m.		at Xavier	W 75–70		Cintas Center; Cincinnati, OH
October 26, 2025*; 4:00 p.m., ESPN+		Northern State	W 112–74		CFSB Center (2,716); Murray, KY
Non-conference regular season
November 3, 2025*; 12:30 p.m., ESPN+		vs. Omaha; Field of 68 Opening Day Marathon	W 85–77	1–0	Sanford Pentagon (1,013); Sioux Falls, SD
November 7, 2025*; 7:00 p.m., ESPN+		Mississippi Valley State	W 108–60	2–0	CFSB Center (5,214); Murray, KY
November 11, 2025*; 7:00 p.m., ACCN		at SMU	L 91–102	2–1	Moody Coliseum (4,348); Dallas, TX
November 15, 2025*; 4:30 p.m., ESPN+		Nicholls	W 99–79	3–1	CFSB Center (5,079); Murray, KY
November 18, 2025*; 7:00 p.m., ESPN+		Little Rock	W 89–68	4–1	CFSB Center (5,079); Murray, KY
November 23, 2025*; 6:30 p.m., FloHoops		vs. Middle Tennessee; Cayman Islands Classic	L 87–90	4–2	John Gray Gymnasium (555); Grand Cayman, Cayman Islands
November 24, 2025*; 6:30 p.m., FloHoops		vs. McNeese; Cayman Islands Classic	L 60–73	4–3	John Gray Gymnasium; Grand Cayman, Cayman Islands
November 25, 2025*; 6:30 p.m., FloHoops		vs. George Washington; Cayman Islands Classic	W 96–95	5–3	John Gray Gymnasium; Grand Cayman, Cayman Islands
December 2, 2025*; 7:00 p.m., ESPN+		Morehead State	W 84–52	6–3	CFSB Center (4,716); Murray, KY
December 6, 2025*; 2:00 p.m., ESPN+		Bellarmine	W 81–68	7–3	CFSB Center (4,762); Murray, KY
December 13, 2025*; 3:00 p.m., BallerTV		vs. Akron; Jack Jones Classic	W 115–100	8–3	Lee's Family Forum; Henderson, NV
Conference regular season
December 18, 2025; 7:00 p.m., ESPN+		Drake	W 81–72	9–3 (1–0)	CFSB Center (4,377); Murray, KY
December 21, 2025; 1:00 p.m., ESPN+		at Valparaiso	W 85–79	10–3 (2–0)	Athletics–Recreation Center (1,612); Valparaiso, IN
December 29, 2025; 6:00 p.m., MVC TV Network		Southern Illinois	W 84–81	11–3 (3–0)	CFSB Center (5,058); Murray, KY
January 1, 2026; 8:00 p.m., MVC TV Network		at UIC	W 81–77	12–3 (4–0)	Credit Union 1 Arena (805); Chicago, IL
January 4, 2026; 4:00 p.m., ESPN2		Bradley	W 86–66	13–3 (5–0)	CFSB Center (5,165); Murray, KY
January 7, 2026; 7:00 p.m., ESPN+		at Evansville	W 79–69	14–3 (6–0)	Ford Center (4,017); Evansville, IN
January 10, 2026; 3:00 p.m., ESPN+		Valparaiso	W 92–79	15–3 (7–0)	CFSB Center (5,112); Murray, KY
January 17, 2026; 3:00 p.m., ESPN+		Indiana State	W 85–81	16–3 (8–0)	CFSB Center (8,083); Murray, KY
January 21, 2026; 6:00 p.m., CBSSN		at Drake	L 90–101	16–4 (8–1)	The Knapp Center (3,148); Des Moines, IA
January 24, 2026; 3:00 p.m., CBSSN		at Northern Iowa	L 76–81	16–5 (8–2)	McLeod Center (4,073); Cedar Falls, IA
January 28, 2026; 8:00 p.m., MVC TV Network		Illinois State	L 65–70	16–6 (8–3)	CFSB Center (5,553); Murray, KY
January 31, 2026; 7:00 p.m., CBSSN		at Belmont	L 86–103	16–7 (8–4)	Curb Event Center (3,718); Nashville, TN
February 3, 2026; 7:00 p.m., ESPN+		UIC	W 81–74	17–7 (9–4)	CFSB Center (4,840); Murray, KY
February 6, 2026; 7:00 p.m., ESPN+		at Southern Illinois	W 91–81	18–7 (10–4)	Banterra Center (5,234); Carbondale, IL
February 9, 2026; 9:00 p.m., CBSSN		Northern Iowa	L 60–89	18–8 (10–5)	CFSB Center (4,394); Murray, KY
February 12, 2026; 6:00 p.m., ESPN+		at Indiana State	W 74–72	19–8 (11–5)	Hulman Center (4,506); Terre Haute, IN
February 15, 2026; 5:00 p.m., ESPN2		Belmont	L 70–87	19–9 (11–6)	CFSB Center (5,756); Murray, KY
February 18, 2026; 8:00 p.m., ESPNU		at Illinois State	L 61–78	19–10 (11–7)	CEFCU Arena (4,319); Normal, IL
February 21, 2026; 3:00 p.m., ESPN+		Evansville; Senior Day	W 88–75	20–10 (12–7)	CFSB Center (5,302); Murray, KY
March 1, 2026; 1:00 p.m., ESPN2		at Bradley	L 78–87	20–11 (12–8)	Carver Arena (7,525); Peoria, IL
Conference tournament
March 6, 2026*; 2:30 p.m., MVC TV Network	(4)	vs. (5) UIC; Arch Madness Quarterfinal	L 79–92	20–12	Enterprise Center (8,068); St. Louis, MO
NIT
March 18, 2026*; 9:00 p.m., ESPN+		at (2 AU) Nevada; First round	L 75–89	20–13	Lawlor Events Center (5,588); Reno, NV
*Non-conference game. ^{#}Rankings from AP Poll. (#) Tournament seedings in parentheses. AU=Auburn. All times are in Central Time Zone.
