= 2025–26 Northern Iowa Panthers men's basketball team =

American college basketball season

2025–26 Northern Iowa Panthers men's basketball

Missouri Valley tournament champions

NCAA tournament, First round
- Conference: Missouri Valley Conference
- Record: 23–13 (11–9 MVC)
- Head coach: Ben Jacobson (20th season)
- Associate head coach: P. J. Hogan
- Assistant coaches: Seth Tuttle; Gameli Ahelegbe
- Home arena: McLeod Center

2025–26 Missouri Valley Conference men's basketball standings
	Conf.				Overall
Team	W		L	PCT	W		L	PCT
Belmont	16	–	4	.800	26	–	6	.813
Bradley	13	–	7	.650	21	–	13	.618
Illinois State	12	–	8	.600	23	–	13	.639
Murray State	12	–	8	.600	20	–	13	.606
UIC	12	–	8	.600	19	–	16	.543
Northern Iowa †	11	–	9	.550	23	–	13	.639
Valparaiso	11	–	9	.550	18	–	15	.545
Southern Illinois	10	–	10	.500	16	–	16	.500
Drake	6	–	14	.300	14	–	20	.412
Indiana State	4	–	16	.200	11	–	21	.344
Evansville	3	–	17	.150	7	–	25	.219
† 2026 MVC tournament winner

The 2025–26 Northern Iowa Panthers men's basketball team represented the University of Northern Iowa during the 2025–26 NCAA Division I men's basketball season. The Panthers, led by 20th-year head coach Ben Jacobson, played their home games at the McLeod Center located in Cedar Falls, Iowa as members of the Missouri Valley Conference. The Panthers finished the season 23–13, 11–9 in MVC play to finish in a tie for sixth place. As the No. 6 seed in the MVC tournament, they defeated Evansville, Illinois State, Bradley, and UIC to win the tournament championship. As a result, the received the conference's automatic bid to the NCAA tournament, their first since 2016, as the No. 12 seed in the East region. There they lost to St. John's.

On March 30, 2026, head coach Ben Jacobsen left the school after 20 seasons to take the head coaching position at Utah State. On April 1, the school named Iowa State assistant coach Kyle Green the team's new head coach. Green had previously been an assistant under Jacobsen for three different stints.

== Previous season ==
The Panthers finished the 2024–25 season 20–13, 14–6 in MVC play to finish in third place. They were upset in the quarterfinals of the MVC tournament by Valparaiso. They received an at-large berth to the National Invitation Tournament where they lost to SMU in the first round.

== Schedule and results ==
Date time, TV	Rank^{#}	Opponent^{#}	Result	Record	Site (attendance) city, state
Exhibition season
November 1, 2025*; 7:00 pm, ESPN+		Upper Iowa	W 96–64		McLeod Center; Cedar Falls, IA
Regular season
November 6, 2025*; 7:00 pm, ESPN+		Cal State Northridge	W 86–57	1–0	McLeod Center (3,173); Cedar Falls, IA
November 9, 2025*; 1:00 pm, ESPN+		South Dakota State	W 65–58	2–0	McLeod Center (3,657); Cedar Falls, IA
November 14, 2025*; 6:00 pm, ESPN+		Furman	W 70–54	3–0	McLeod Center (3,585); Cedar Falls, IA
November 18, 2025*; 7:00 pm, ESPN+		Northern Illinois	W 70–57	4–0	McLeod Center (3,283); Cedar Falls, IA
November 22, 2025*; 7:00 pm, ESPN+		at UC Irvine	W 70–69 ^{OT}	5–0	Bren Events Center (1,618); Irvine, CA
November 25, 2025*; 3:00 pm, CBSSN		vs. Loyola–Chicago; Acrisure Holiday Invitational Semifinal	W 72–51	6–0	Acrisure Arena; Palm Springs, CA
November 26, 2025*; 3:30 pm, CBSSN		vs. Tulsa; Acrisure Holiday Invitational Final	L 60–63	6–1	Acrisure Arena; Palm Springs, CA
December 1, 2025*; 7:00 pm, ESPN+		Coe	W 99–34	7–1	McLeod Center (2,686); Cedar Falls, IA
December 6, 2025*; 7:00 pm, ESPN+		Wichita State	L 69–74 ^{OT}	7–2	McLeod Center (4,034); Cedar Falls, IA
December 13, 2025*; 5:00 pm, ESPN+		Oakland	W 75–63	8–2	McLeod Center (3,794); Cedar Falls, IA
December 17, 2025; 4:00 pm, Marquee		at UIC	W 60–54	9–2 (1–0)	Credit Union 1 Arena; Chicago, IL
December 22, 2025*; 9:00 pm, ESPN+		at Saint Mary's	L 58–63	9–3	University Credit Union Pavilion (3,500); Moraga, CA
December 29, 2025; 7:00 pm, MVC TV Network		Valparaiso	W 58–48	10–3 (2–0)	McLeod Center (3,558); Cedar Falls, IA
January 1, 2026; 7:00 pm, ESPN+		Indiana State	W 75–66	11–3 (3–0)	McLeod Center (3,322); Cedar Falls, IA
January 4, 2026; 3:00 p.m., ESPN+		at Evansville	W 62–48	12–3 (4–0)	Ford Center (3,717); Evansville, IN
January 7, 2026; 6:00 pm, MVC TV Network		Belmont	L 65–78	12–4 (4–1)	McLeod Center (3,626); Cedar Falls, IA
January 10, 2026; 5:00 p.m., ESPNU		at Bradley	L 69–75	12–5 (4–2)	Carver Arena (6,004); Peoria, IL
January 13, 2026; 6:00 pm, MVC TV Network		UIC	L 61–69	12–6 (4–3)	McLeod Center (3,344); Cedar Falls, IA
January 17, 2026; 2:00 p.m., ESPN+		at Valparaiso	L 44–54	12–7 (4–4)	Athletics–Recreation Center (1,863); Valparaiso, IN
January 21, 2026; 8:00 p.m., ESPNU		at Illinois State	L 54–59	12–8 (4–5)	CEFCU Arena (4,312); Normal, IL
January 24, 2026; 3:00 pm, CBSSN		Murray State	W 81–76	13–8 (5–5)	McLeod Center (4,073); Cedar Falls, IA
January 28, 2026; 6:00 pm, MVC TV Network		at Southern Illinois	L 50–65	13–9 (5–6)	Banterra Center (3,670); Carbondale, IL
January 31, 2026; 3:00 pm, ESPN+		Evansville	W 71–55	14–9 (6–6)	McLeod Center (4,136); Cedar Falls, IA
February 6, 2026; 7:00 pm, CBSSN		Bradley	W 61–49	15–9 (7–6)	McLeod Center (4,186); Cedar Falls, IA
February 9, 2026; 9:00 pm, CBSSN		at Murray State	W 89–60	16–9 (8–6)	CFSB Center (4,394); Murray, KY
February 12, 2026; 8:00 pm, MVC TV Network		at Belmont	L 86–91	16–10 (8–7)	Curb Event Center (1,601); Nashville, TN
February 15, 2026; 2:00 pm, CBSSN		Drake; Rivalry	W 86–62	17–10 (9–7)	McLeod Center (5,786); Cedar Falls, IA
February 18, 2026; 6:00 pm, ESPN+		at Indiana State	W 81–60	18–10 (10–7)	Hulman Center (4,208); Terre Haute, IN
February 21, 2026; 5:00 pm, ESPN+		Southern Illinois; Senior Day	L 57–59	18–11 (10–8)	McLeod Center (4,102); Cedar Falls, IA
February 25, 2026; 6:00 pm, ESPNU		Illinois State	L 69–71	18–12 (10–9)	McLeod Center (3,907); Cedar Falls, IA
March 1, 2026; 2:00 pm, ESPN+		at Drake; Rivalry	W 75–53	19–12 (11–9)	The Knapp Center (4,488); Des Moines, IA
Conference tournament
March 5, 2026*; 8:30 p.m., MVC TV Network	(6)	vs. (11) Evansville; Arch Madness Opening Round	W 68−59	20−12	Enterprise Center (8,960); St. Louis, MO
March 6, 2026*; 8:30 p.m., MVC TV Network	(6)	vs. (3) Illinois State; Arch Madness Quarterfinal	W 74−52	21−12	Enterprise Center (8,897); St. Louis, MO
March 7, 2026*; 5:00 p.m., CBSSN	(6)	vs. (2) Bradley; Arch Madness Semifinal	W 73−69	22−12	Enterprise Center (7,444); St. Louis, MO
March 8, 2026*; 11:00 a.m., CBS	(6)	vs. (5) UIC; Arch Madness Final	W 84−69	23−12	Enterprise Center (6,750); St. Louis, MO
NCAA Tournament
March 20, 2026*; 6:10 p.m., CBS	(12 E)	vs. (5 E) No. 10 St. John's; First round	L 53–79	23–13	Viejas Arena; San Diego, CA
*Non-conference game. ^{#}Rankings from AP Poll. (#) Tournament seedings in parentheses. E=East. All times are in Central Time Zone.
