= 2025–26 Indiana State Sycamores men's basketball team =

American college basketball season

2025–26 Indiana State Sycamores men's basketball
- Conference: Missouri Valley Conference
- Record: 11–21 (4–16 MVC)
- Head coach: Matthew Graves (2nd season)
- Associate head coach: Mark Slessinger
- Assistant coaches: Byron Jones; Isaiah Tisdale; Jake Odum; Bradley Feig
- Home arena: Hulman Center

2025–26 Missouri Valley Conference men's basketball standings
	Conf.				Overall
Team	W		L	PCT	W		L	PCT
Belmont	16	–	4	.800	26	–	6	.813
Bradley	13	–	7	.650	21	–	13	.618
Illinois State	12	–	8	.600	23	–	13	.639
Murray State	12	–	8	.600	20	–	13	.606
UIC	12	–	8	.600	19	–	16	.543
Northern Iowa †	11	–	9	.550	23	–	13	.639
Valparaiso	11	–	9	.550	18	–	15	.545
Southern Illinois	10	–	10	.500	16	–	16	.500
Drake	6	–	14	.300	14	–	20	.412
Indiana State	4	–	16	.200	11	–	21	.344
Evansville	3	–	17	.150	7	–	25	.219
† 2026 MVC tournament winner

The 2025–26 Indiana State Sycamores men's basketball team represented Indiana State University during the 2025–26 NCAA Division I men's basketball season. The Sycamores, led by second-year head coach Matthew Graves, played their home games at the Hulman Center in Terre Haute, Indiana, as members of the Missouri Valley Conference. They finished the season 11–21, 4–16 in MVC play to finish in 10th place. They lost in the opening round of the MVC tournament to Valparaiso.

== Previous season ==
The Sycamores finished the 2024–25 season 14–18, 8–12 in MVC play to finish in a tie for eighth place. They were defeated by Southern Illinois in the opening round of the MVC tournament.

== Roster ==
2025–26 Indiana State Sycamores men's basketball team
Players
Coaches

Pos.	#	Name	Height	Weight	Year	Previous school	Hometown
G	0	Sterling Young	6 ft 1 in (1.85 m)	175 lb (79 kg)	GS	Florida A&M	Queens, NY
G	2	Jayan Walker	6 ft 6 in (1.98 m)	200 lb (91 kg)	So	Combine Academy	Raleigh, NC
G	4	Bruno Alocen	6 ft 6 in (1.98 m)	195 lb (88 kg)	So	Bàsquet Manresa	Barcelona, Spain
G	5	Zyair Greene	6 ft 3 in (1.91 m)	200 lb (91 kg)	GS	Georgia College & State	Atlanta, GA
G	6	Jo Van Buggenhout	6 ft 2 in (1.88 m)	195 lb (88 kg)	Jr	Hubo Limburg United	Antwerp, Belgium
C	7	Hunter Harding	7 ft 1 in (2.16 m)	255 lb (116 kg)	So	Central Michigan	Toronto, ON
G	8	Camp Wagner	6 ft 6 in (1.98 m)	190 lb (86 kg)	Jr	Rice	Dallas, TX
G	9	Sivert Wærstad Nordheim	6 ft 6 in (1.98 m)	190 lb (86 kg)	Fr	Centrum	Oslo, Norway
F	10	Enel St. Bernard	6 ft 6 in (1.98 m)	215 lb (98 kg)	Jr	Panola College	Hartford Village, Grenada
C	11	Markus Harding	6 ft 10 in (2.08 m)	255 lb (116 kg)	GS	Central Michigan	Toronto, ON
G	12	Caden Huttenlocker	6 ft 2 in (1.88 m)	185 lb (84 kg)	RS Jr	Lincoln Trail	Ellettsville, IN
G	13	Cooper Bean	6 ft 3 in (1.91 m)	190 lb (86 kg)	RS So	Noblesville HS	Noblesville, IN
G	21	Martin Kaupanger	6 ft 5 in (1.96 m)	190 lb (86 kg)	Fr	Annie Wright	Gig Harbor, WA
F	23	Ian Scott	6 ft 7 in (2.01 m)	220 lb (100 kg)	GS	Grace College	Plainfield, IN
G	30	Xavier Hall	6 ft 0 in (1.83 m)	185 lb (84 kg)	Sr	Truman State	Shawnee Mission, KS
C	35	Derek Vorst	6 ft 10 in (2.08 m)	250 lb (113 kg)	Jr	Rossford High School	Luckey, OH

Head coach

- Matthew Graves (Butler)

Assistant coach(es)

- Mark Slessinger (Aurora)
- Byron Jones (Central Oklahoma)
- Isaiah Tisdale (East Tennessee State)
- Jake Odum (Indiana State)
- Bradley Feig (New Orleans)

Legend

- (C) Team captain
- (S) Suspended
- (I) Ineligible
- (W) Walk-on
- Injured
- Current redshirt

Roster
Last update: December 10, 2025

== Schedule and results ==
Date time, TV	Rank^{#}	Opponent^{#}	Result	Record	Site (attendance) city, state
Exhibition Season
October 29, 2025*; 7:00 p.m.		at Butler	L 80–105		Hinkle Fieldhouse (6,994); Indianapolis, IN
Non-conference Regular Season
November 3, 2025*; 8:00 p.m., ESPN+		at Charlotte	L 76–92	0–1	Halton Arena (3,255); Charlotte, NC
November 6, 2025*; 7:00 p.m., ESPN+		Illinois Tech	W 104–73	1–1	Hulman Center (5,426); Terre Haute, IN
November 10, 2025*; 7:00 p.m., ESPN+		at SIU Edwardsville	W 64–55	2–1	First Community Arena (2,482); Edwardsville, IL
November 14, 2025*; 7:00 p.m., ACCN		at No. 4 Duke	L 62–100	2–2	Cameron Indoor Stadium (9,314); Durham, NC
November 19, 2025*; 7:00 p.m., ESPN+		Louisiana Tech	W 60–51	3–2	Hulman Center (4,442); Terre Haute, IN
November 22, 2025*; 7:00 p.m., ESPN+		Ball State	W 70–52	4–2	Hulman Center (4,718); Terre Haute, IN
November 26, 2025*; 6:30 p.m., ESPN+		at Louisiana Tech; Louisiana Tech Multi–Team Event	L 73–75	4–3	Thomas Assembly Center (2,022); Ruston, LA
November 28, 2025*; 1:00 p.m.		vs. Alcorn State; Louisiana Tech Multi–Team Event	L 74–81	4–4	Thomas Assembly Center (160); Ruston, LA
December 2, 2025*; 7:00 p.m., ESPN+		Eureka	W 99–57	5–4	Hulman Center (4,026); Terre Haute, IN
December 7, 2025; 1:00 p.m., ESPN+		Southern Indiana	W 77–55	6–4	Hulman Center (4,198); Terre Haute, IN
December 14, 2025; 2:00 p.m., ESPN+		at Milwaukee	W 70–68	7–4	UW–Milwaukee Panther Arena (1,824); Milwaukee, WI
Conference Regular Season
December 18, 2025; 7:00 p.m., MVC TV/ESPN+		Bradley	L 99–108 ^{3OT}	7–5 (0–1)	Hulman Center (4,719); Terre Haute, IN
December 21, 2025; 5:00 p.m., Marquee/ESPN+		at Illinois State	L 65–85	7–6 (0–2)	CEFCU Arena (4,481); Normal, IL
December 29, 2025; 7:00 p.m., ESPN+		Belmont	W 81–80 ^{OT}	8–6 (1–2)	Hulman Center (4,439); Terre Haute, IN
January 1, 2026; 8:00 p.m., ESPN+		at Northern Iowa	L 66–75	8–7 (1–3)	McLeod Center (3,322); Cedar Falls, IA
January 4, 2026; 3:00 p.m., ESPN+		at Drake	L 72–74	8–8 (1–4)	The Knapp Center (3,713); Des Moines, IA
January 10, 2026; 1:00 p.m., ESPN+		Evansville	L 69–72	8–9 (1–5)	Hulman Center (4,782); Terre Haute, IN
January 14, 2026; 7:00 p.m., ESPN+		Illinois State	W 94–89	9–9 (2–5)	Hulman Center (4,452); Terre Haute, IN
January 17, 2026; 4:00 p.m., ESPN+		at Murray State	L 81–85	9–10 (2–6)	CFSB Center (8,083); Murray, KY
January 21, 2026; 7:00 p.m., MVC TV/ESPN+		at Bradley	L 68–75	9–11 (2–7)	Carver Arena (5,327); Peoria, IL
January 24, 2026; 1:00 p.m., ESPN+		Drake	L 62–76	9–12 (2–8)	Hulman Center (4,591); Terre Haute, IN
January 27, 2026; 8:00 p.m., ESPN+		at UIC	L 74–76	9–13 (2–9)	Credit Union 1 Arena (1,440); Chicago, IL
January 31, 2026; 1:00 p.m., ESPN+		Valparaiso	L 72–76 ^{OT}	9–14 (2–10)	Hulman Center (5,137); Terre Haute, IN
February 3, 2026; 8:00 p.m., ESPN+		at Evansville	W 84–63	10–14 (3–10)	Ford Center (3,805); Evansville, IN
February 9, 2026; 7:00 p.m., ESPN+		Southern Illinois	L 65–80	10–15 (3–11)	Hulman Center (4,705); Terre Haute, IN
February 12, 2026; 7:00 p.m., ESPN+		Murray State	L 72–74	10–16 (3–12)	Hulman Center (4,506); Terre Haute, IN
February 15, 2026; 2:00 p.m., ESPN+		at Valparaiso	L 75–76	10–17 (3–13)	Athletics–Recreation Center (2,065); Valparaiso, IN
February 18, 2026; 7:00 p.m., ESPN+		Northern Iowa	L 60–81	10–18 (3–14)	Hulman Center (4,208); Terre Haute, IN
February 21, 2026; 8:00 p.m., ESPN+		at Belmont	L 70–87	10–19 (3–15)	Curb Event Center (3,644); Nashville, TN
February 25, 2026; 8:00 p.m., ESPN+		at Southern Illinois	L 55–66	10–20 (3–16)	Banterra Center (3,404); Carbondale, IL
March 1, 2026; 1:00 p.m., ESPN+		UIC; Senior Day	W 79–63	11–20 (4–16)	Hulman Center (4,184); Terre Haute, IN
Conference Tournament
March 5, 2026*; 6:00 p.m., MVC TV/ESPN+	(10)	vs. (7) Valparaiso; Arch Madness Opening Round	L 62–63	11–21	Enterprise Center (8,960); St. Louis, MO
*Non-conference game. ^{#}Rankings from AP Poll. (#) Tournament seedings in parentheses. All times are in Eastern Time Zone.

== See also ==
- 2025–26 Indiana State Sycamores women's basketball team
