= 2026 Missouri Valley Conference men's basketball tournament =

American college basketball postseason tournament

- Tournament logo
- Classification: Division I
- Season: 2025–26
- Teams: 11
- Site: Enterprise Center; St. Louis, Missouri
- Champions: Northern Iowa (6th title)
- Winning coach: Ben Jacobson (5th title)
- MVP: Trey Campbell (Northern Iowa)
- Attendance: 40,119 (Overall); 6,750 (Final)
- Television: CBS/Paramount+, CBSSN, MVC TV Network/ESPN+

2025–26 Missouri Valley Conference men's basketball standings
	Conf.				Overall
Team	W		L	PCT	W		L	PCT
Belmont	16	–	4	.800	26	–	6	.813
Bradley	13	–	7	.650	21	–	13	.618
Illinois State	12	–	8	.600	23	–	13	.639
Murray State	12	–	8	.600	20	–	13	.606
UIC	12	–	8	.600	19	–	16	.543
Northern Iowa †	11	–	9	.550	23	–	13	.639
Valparaiso	11	–	9	.550	18	–	15	.545
Southern Illinois	10	–	10	.500	16	–	16	.500
Drake	6	–	14	.300	14	–	20	.412
Indiana State	4	–	16	.200	11	–	21	.344
Evansville	3	–	17	.150	7	–	25	.219
† 2026 MVC tournament winner

The 2026 Missouri Valley Conference Men's Basketball Tournament, popularly referred to as "Arch Madness", was a postseason men's basketball tournament that completed the 2025–26 season in the Missouri Valley Conference. The tournament was held at the Enterprise Center in St. Louis, Missouri from March 5–8, 2026. The winner, Northern Iowa, received the conference's automatic bid to the 2026 NCAA Division I men's basketball tournament.

This would be the last year that this bracket style was used.

== Seeds ==
Teams are seeded by conference record.

Two-way ties are broken by utilizing head-to-head record; should a tie still remain, the NCAA Evaluation Tool (NET) rankings the day following all conference teams having completed their regular season will be used.

Three (or more) way ties are broken by first determining the cumulative record for each tied team versus the other teams with the same conference record. Should any teams still remain tied (and there are more than two), the cumulative record would again be used on those remaining teams; should any teams still remain (and there are only two), the two-way approach would be leveraged.

Seed	School	Conference Record	Tiebreaker
1	Belmont	16–4	
2	Bradley	13–7	
3	Illinois State	12–8	NET (90)
4	Murray State	12–8	NET (101)
5	UIC	12–8	NET (116)
6	Northern Iowa	11–9	NET (81)
7	Valparaiso	11–9	NET (155)
8	Southern Illinois	10–10	
9	Drake	6–14	
10	Indiana State	4–16	
11	Evansville	3–17	

== Schedule ==
Session	Game	Time *	Matchup	Score	Attendance	Television
Opening Round – March 5
1	1	3:30 pm	No. 8 Southern Illinois vs. No. 9 Drake	63–67	8,960	MVC TV Network/ESPN+
1	2	6:00 pm	No. 7 Valparaiso vs. No. 10 Indiana State	63–62	8,960	MVC TV Network/ESPN+
1	3	8:30 pm	No. 6 Northern Iowa vs. No. 11 Evansville	68–59	8,960	MVC TV Network/ESPN+
Quarterfinals – March 6
2	4	12:00 pm	No. 1 Belmont vs. No. 9 Drake	79–100	8,068	MVC TV Network/ESPN+
2	5	2:30 pm	No. 4 Murray State vs. No. 5 UIC	79–92	8,068	MVC TV Network/ESPN+
3	6	6:00 pm	No. 2 Bradley vs. No. 7 Valparaiso	90–84 ^{2OT}	8,897	MVC TV Network/ESPN+
3	7	8:30 pm	No. 3 Illinois State vs. No. 6 Northern Iowa	52–74	8,897	MVC TV Network/ESPN+
Semifinals – March 7
4	8	2:30 pm	No. 5 UIC vs. No. 9 Drake	72–51	7,444	CBSSN
4	9	5:00 pm	No. 2 Bradley vs. No. 6 Northern Iowa	69–73	7,444	CBSSN
Final – March 8
5	10	11:00 am	No. 5 UIC vs. No. 6 Northern Iowa	69–84	6,750	CBS/Paramount+
* Game times in Central Time Zone; rankings denote tournament seed.

== Bracket ==
Opening Round; March 5 MVC TV Network/ESPN+
8	Southern Illinois	63
9	Drake	67
7	Valparaiso	63
10	Indiana State	62
6	Northern Iowa	68
11	Evansville	59

Quarterfinals; March 6 MVC TV Network/ESPN+
1	Belmont	79
9	Drake	100
4	Murray State	79
5	UIC	92
2	Bradley	90
7	Valparaiso	84 ^{2OT}
3	Illinois State	52
6	Northern Iowa	74

Semifinals; March 7 CBSSN
9	Drake	51
5	UIC	72
2	Bradley	69
6	Northern Iowa	73

Final; March 8 CBS/Paramount+
5	UIC	69
6	Northern Iowa	84

== Game summaries ==
=== Opening Round ===
MVC TV Network

March 5
3:30 p.m. CST

Box Score

No. 8 Southern Illinois 63, No. 9 Drake 67
Scoring by half: 27–31, 40–32
Pts: 28 – Q. House; Rebs: 16 – R. Aligbe; Asts: 3 – Q. House	Pts: 22 – J. Quinn; Rebs: 11 – A. Alia; Asts: 4 – O. Larson
Game 1

Enterprise Center
St. Louis, MO
Referees: Rick Crawford, Randy Heimerman, Bert Smith

MVC TV Network

March 5
6:00 p.m.

Box Score

No. 7 Valparaiso 63, No. 10 Indiana State 62
Scoring by half: 37–28, 25–35
Pts: 18 – R. Chaney; Rebs: 7 – J. Pettigrew; Asts: 5 – R. Chaney	Pts: 13 – C. Wagner; Rebs: 8 – C. Wagner; Asts: 5 – J. Van Buggenhout
Game 2

Enterprise Center
St. Louis, MO
Referees: Jeff Campbell, James Duke, Kipp Kissinger

MVC TV Network

March 5
8:30 p.m.

Box Score

No. 6 Northern Iowa 68, No. 11 Evansville 59
Scoring by half: 35–36, 33–23
Pts: 23 – T. Campbell; Rebs: 13 – T. Smith; Asts: 4 – T. Smith	Pts: 23 – A. Casey; Rebs: 10 – A. Casey; Asts: 3 – Tied (2)
Game 3

Enterprise Center
St. Louis, MO
Attendance: 8,960
Referees: Tyler Kumpf, Jeff Malham, Doug Sirmons

=== Quarterfinal Round ===
MVC TV Network

March 6
12:00 p.m. CST

Box Score

No. 1 Belmont 79, No. 9 Drake 100
Scoring by half: 41–48, 38–52
Pts: 19 – A. Noyes; Rebs: 8 – D. Scharnowski; Asts: 6 – E. Dillon	Pts: 31 – J. Quinn; Rebs: 8 – O. Larson; Asts: 8 – O. Larson
Game 4

Enterprise Center
St. Louis, MO
Referees: Jeff Campbell, Tyler Kumpf, Doug Sirmons

MVC TV Network

March 6
2:30 p.m.

No. 4 Murray State 79, No. 5 Illinois Chicago 92
Scoring by half: 50–32, 42–47
Pts: 30 – J. Jackson; Rebs: 6 – F. King; Asts: 4 – K. Tenner	Pts: 19 – E. Crawford; Rebs: 9 – R. Washington Jr. Asts: 6 – E. Crawford
Game 5

Enterprise Center
St. Louis, MO
Attendance: 8,068
Referees: Tony Padilla, Roland Simmons, Bert Smith

MVC TV Network

March 6
6:00 p.m.

Box Score

No. 2 Bradley 90, No. 7 Valparaiso 84 (2OT)
Scoring by half: 31–31, 33–33 Overtime: 9–9, 17–11
Pts: 18 – Tied (2); Rebs: 9 – A. Smith; Asts: 5 – J. Johnson	Pts: 25 – B. Whitaker; Rebs: 13 – J. Pettigrew; Asts: 9 – J. Pettigrew
Game 6

Enterprise Center
St. Louis, MO
Referees: Marques Pettigrew, Brooks Wells, Ervin Wilson

MVC TV Network

March 6
8:30 p.m.

Box Score

No. 3 Illinois State 52, No. 6 Northern Iowa 74
Scoring by half: 27–35, 25–39
Pts: 11 – C. Walker; Rebs: 6 – T. Pence; Asts: 3 – J. Kinziger	Pts: 19 – L. Bond III; Rebs: 6 – T. Campbell; Asts: 6 – W. Hornseth
Game 7

Enterprise Center
St. Louis, MO
Attendance: 8,897
Referees: Ed Crenshaw, Randy Heimerman, Kipp Kissinger

=== Semifinal Round ===
CBS Sports Network

March 7
2:30 p.m. CST

Box Score

No. 5 Illinois Chicago 72, No. 9 Drake 51
Scoring by half: 34–27, 38–24
Pts: 23 – R. Washington Jr. Rebs: 12 – M. Lowery; Asts: 5 – M. Lowery	Pts: 14 – J. Quinn; Rebs: 5 – I. Carr; Asts: 5 – O. Larson
Game 8

Enterprise Center
St. Louis, MO
Referees: Jeff Campbell, Jeff Malham, Ervin Wilson

CBS Sports Network

March 7
5:00 p.m.

Box Score

No. 2 Bradley 69, No. 6 Northern Iowa 73
Scoring by half: 32–45, 37–28
Pts: 12 – T. van der Knapp; Rebs: 6 – T. van der Knapp; Asts: 5 – J. Johnson	Pts: 19 – L. Bond III; Rebs: 5 – B. Schwieger; Asts: 6 – T. Campbell
Game 9

Enterprise Center
St. Louis, MO
Attendance: 7,444
Referees: Randy Heimerman, Kipp Kissinger, Marques Pettigrew

=== Final Round ===
CBS

March 8
11:00 a.m. CDT

Box Score

No. 5 Illinois Chicago 69, No. 6 Northern Iowa 84
Scoring by half: 41–48, 28–36
Pts: 28 – E. Crawford; Rebs: 4 – Tied (2); Asts: 5 – E. Crawford	Pts: 23 – T. Campbell; Rebs: 5 – T. Smith; Asts: 7 – T. Smith
Championship

Enterprise Center
St. Louis, MO
Attendance: 6,750
Referees: Kipp Kissinger, Maques Pettigrew, Brooks Wells

== Awards and honors ==
=== All-Tournament Team ===
Player	Team
Leon Bond III	Northern Iowa
Trey Campbell ^{MOP}	Northern Iowa
Elijah Crawford	UIC
Jalen Quinn	Drake
Rashund Washington Jr.	UIC

MOP denotes Most Outstanding Player (Doug Elgin Award)
