= 2025–26 Nevada Wolf Pack men's basketball team =

American college basketball season

2025–26 Nevada Wolf Pack men's basketball
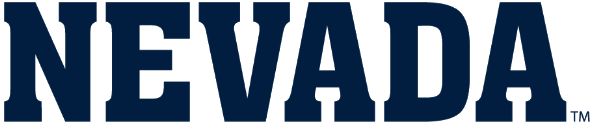

NIT, Quarterfinals
- Conference: Mountain West Conference
- Record: 24–13 (12–8 MW)
- Head coach: Steve Alford (7th season)
- Associate head coach: Craig Neal (7th season)
- Assistant coaches: Bil Duany (7th season); Lo Leath (1st season); Michael Furlong (4th season); Jarod Lucas (1st season)
- Home arena: Lawlor Events Center (Capacity: 12,000)

2025–26 Mountain West Conference men's basketball standings
	Conf.				Overall
Team	W		L	PCT	W		L	PCT
Utah State †	15	–	5	.750	29	–	7	.806
San Diego State	14	–	6	.700	22	–	11	.667
New Mexico	13	–	7	.650	26	–	11	.703
Grand Canyon	13	–	7	.650	20	–	12	.625
Nevada	12	–	8	.600	24	–	13	.649
Boise State	12	–	8	.600	20	–	12	.625
Colorado State	11	–	9	.550	21	–	13	.618
UNLV	11	–	9	.550	18	–	17	.514
Wyoming	9	–	11	.450	18	–	15	.545
Fresno State	7	–	13	.350	13	–	19	.406
San Jose State	3	–	17	.150	9	–	24	.273
Air Force	0	–	20	.000	3	–	29	.094
† 2026 Mountain West tournament winner

The 2025–26 Nevada Wolf Pack men's basketball team represented the University of Nevada, Reno during the 2025–26 NCAA Division I men's basketball season. The Wolf Pack, led by seventh-year head coach Steve Alford, played their home games at Lawlor Events Center in Reno, Nevada as a member of the Mountain West Conference.

== Previous season ==
The Wolf Pack finished the 2024-25 season 17–16, 8–12 in Mountain West play to finish seventh in the conference. As the 7-seed in the Mountain West Tournament they would defeat 10-seed Fresno State 86–71 before falling to 2-seed Colorado State 67–59 in the Quarterfinals to end their season.

== Offseason ==
=== Departures ===
Name	Number	Pos.	Height	Weight	Year	Hometown	Reason for departure
Tré Coleman	4	G	6'7"	225	Graduate	Jeffersonville, IN	Out of eligibility
Brandon Love	7	F	6'10"	230	Senior	Houston, TX	Out of eligibility
Kobe Sanders	8	G	6'9"	207	Graduate	San Diego, CA	Drafted 50th overall in the 2025 NBA Draft by the New York Knicks, and traded to the Los Angeles Clippers
Yuto Yamanouchi-Williams	5	G	6'10"	230	Junior	Aizuwakamatsu, Japan	Transferred to Oral Roberts
Nick Davidson	11	F	6'10"	238	(redshirt) Junior	Santa Ana, CA	Transferred to Clemson
Jordan Malmlov	15	G	6'0"	146	Sophomore	Prescott, WI	Departed program
Daniel Foster	20	G	6'6"	215	Graduate	Melbourne, Australia	Out of eligibility
Justin McBride	21	F	6'8"	238	Sophomore	Plano, TX	Transferred to James Madison
K. J. Hymes Jr.	42	F	6'10"	235	Graduate	Phoenix, AZ	Out of eligibility
Xavier DuSell	53	G	6'5"	200	Graduate	Scottsdale, AZ	Out of eligibility

=== Incoming transfers ===
Name	Number	Pos.	Height	Weight	Year	Hometown	Previous college
Elijah Price	1	F	6'9"	215	(redshirt) Sophomore	Long Beach, CA	Fresno State
Corey Camper Jr.	4	G	6'5"	181	Graduate	Little Rock, AR	UTEP
Kaleb Lowery	6	F	6'8"	217	Graduate	San Diego, CA	The Master's
Tayshawn Comer	12	G	6'1"	204	Senior	Indianapolis, IN	Evansville
Joel Armotrading	21	C	6'10"	244	Graduate	London, England	UC Riverside

=== 2025 recruiting class ===
College recruiting
Name	Hometown	School	Height	Weight	Commit date
Christopher Baudreau; PF	Las Vegas, NV	Bishop Gorman HS	6 ft 9 in (2.06 m)	205 lb (93 kg)	Sep 17, 2025
Christopher Baudreau; PF	Recruit ratings: Scout: Rivals: 247Sports: ESPN:				
Ethan Croley; PF	San Antonio, TX	Clark HS	6 ft 9 in (2.06 m)	235 lb (107 kg)	Apr 16, 2025
Ethan Croley; PF	Recruit ratings: Scout: Rivals: 247Sports: ESPN:				
Myles Walker; PG	Eastvale, CA	Eleanor Roosevelt HS	5 ft 8 in (1.73 m)	155 lb (70 kg)	May 20, 2025
Myles Walker; PG	Recruit ratings: Scout: Rivals: 247Sports: ESPN:				
Peyton White; PF	Encino, CA	Crespi HS	6 ft 6 in (1.98 m)	220 lb (100 kg)	Nov 14, 2024
Peyton White; PF	Recruit ratings: Scout: Rivals: 247Sports: ESPN:				
Overall recruit ranking: Scout: – Rivals: –
Note: In many cases, Scout, Rivals, 247Sports, On3, and ESPN may conflict in their listings of height and weight.; In these cases, the average was taken. ESPN grades are on a 100-point scale.; Sources: "2025 Nevada Basketball Recruiting Commits". Scout.; "Scout.com Team Recruiting Rankings". Scout.; "2025 Team Ranking". Rivals.

== Roster ==
2025–26 Nevada Wolf Pack men's basketball team
Players
Coaches

Pos.	#	Name	Height	Weight	Year	Previous school	Hometown
G	0	Chuck Bailey III	6 ft 4 in (1.93 m)	218 lb (99 kg)	Jr	Evansville	Detroit, Michigan
F	1	Elijah Price	6 ft 9 in (2.06 m)	215 lb (98 kg)	RS So	Fresno State	Long Beach, California
G	2	Myles Walker	5 ft 10 in (1.78 m)	163 lb (74 kg)	Fr	Eleanor Roosevelt HS	Riverside, California
G	3	Tyler Rolison	6 ft 0 in (1.83 m)	190 lb (86 kg)	Jr	St. Bernard HS	Los Angeles, California
G	4	Corey Camper Jr.	6 ft 5 in (1.96 m)	181 lb (82 kg)	GS	UTEP	Little Rock, Arkansas
G	5	Amire Robinson	6 ft 3 in (1.91 m)	198 lb (90 kg)	RS So	Buchtel Community Learning Center	Akron, Ohio
F	6	Kaleb Lowery	6 ft 8 in (2.03 m)	217 lb (98 kg)	GS	The Master's	San Diego, California
G	7	Vaughn Weems	6 ft 5 in (1.96 m)	197 lb (89 kg)	Jr	Federal Way HS	Federal Way, Washington
C	10	Jeriah Coleman	7 ft 1 in (2.16 m)	231 lb (105 kg)	GS	Clarendon CC	Anchorage, Alaska
G	12	Tayshawn Comer	6 ft 1 in (1.85 m)	204 lb (93 kg)	Sr	Evansville	Indianapolis, Indiana
G	17	Peyton White	6 ft 6 in (1.98 m)	233 lb (106 kg)	Fr	Crespi Carmelite HS	Encino, California
C	21	Joel Armotrading	6 ft 10 in (2.08 m)	244 lb (111 kg)	GS	UC Riverside	London, England
F	24	Christopher Baudreau	6 ft 9 in (2.06 m)	205 lb (93 kg)	Fr	Bishop Gorman HS	Las Vegas, Nevada
F	50	Ethan Croley	6 ft 9 in (2.06 m)	247 lb (112 kg)	Fr	Tom C. Clark HS	San Antonio, Texas

Head coach

- Steve Alford (Indiana)

Assistant coach(es)

- Craig Neal (Georgia Tech)
- Bil Duany (Indiana)
- Lo Leath (Sacramento State)
- Michael Furlong (Hillsdale)
- Jarod Lucas (Nevada)

Legend

- (C) Team captain
- (S) Suspended
- (I) Ineligible
- (W) Walk-on
- Injured
- Current redshirt

Roster
Last update: 2025-10-25

== Schedule and results ==
Date time, TV	Rank^{#}	Opponent^{#}	Result	Record	High points	High rebounds	High assists	Site (attendance) city, state
Exhibition
October 17, 2025*; 6:00 p.m.		at Utah	W 80–77		18 – Camper Jr.	9 – Weems	4 – Rolison	Jon M. Huntsman Center (2,193); Salt Lake City, UT
October 25, 2025*; 1:00 p.m.		Eastern Washington	W 73–52		14 – Weems	10 – Armotrading	4 – Camper Jr.	Lawlor Events Center (8,741); Reno, NV
Non-conference regular season
November 4, 2025*; 7:00 p.m., MW Network		Louisiana Tech	W 77–50	1–0	24 – Bailey III	8 – Price	7 – Rolison	Lawlor Events Center (7,144); Reno, NV
November 8, 2025*; 7:00 p.m., MW Network		Pacific	W 78–77	2–0	19 – Comer	15 – Armotrading	3 – Camper Jr.	Lawlor Events Center (7,307); Reno, NV
November 12, 2025*; 7:00 p.m., MW Network		Southern Illinois	W 86–81 ^{OT}	3–0	23 – Comer	19 – Price	7 – Tied	Lawlor Events Center (7,001); Reno, NV
November 15, 2025*; 4:00 p.m., ESPN+		at Santa Clara	L 83–98	3–1	21 – Camper	6 – Bailey	4 – Rolison	Leavey Center (1,741); Santa Clara, CA
November 18, 2025*; 7:00 p.m., MW Network		UC Davis; Acrisure Series on-campus game	L 71–75	3–2	15 – Tied	6 – Price	4 – Comer	Lawlor Events Center (6,957); Reno, NV
November 22, 2025*; 2:00 p.m., MW Network		UC Santa Barbara	W 77–64	4–2	27 – Camper Jr.	8 – Price	3 – Bailey III	Lawlor Events Center (7,340); Reno, NV
November 27, 2025*; 1:30 p.m., CBSSN		vs. Washington; Acrisure Holiday Classic semifinal	L 66–83	4–3	16 – Comer	8 – Price	5 – Comer	Acrisure Arena; Thousand Palms, CA
November 28, 2025*; 11:00 a.m., TruTV		vs. San Francisco; Acrisure Holiday Classic third-place game	W 81–65	5–3	22 – Camper Jr.	10 – Croley	6 – Camper Jr.	Acrisure Arena; Thousand Palms, CA
December 2, 2025*; 7:00 p.m., MW Network		UC San Diego	W 76–70	6–3	15 – Camper Jr.	9 – White	6 – Comer	Lawlor Events Center (7,211); Reno, NV
December 7, 2025*; 2:00 p.m., ESPN+		at Washington State	W 78–64	7–3	24 – Comer	8 – Price	2 – Tied	Beasley Coliseum (2,548); Pullman, WA
December 13, 2025*; 7:00 p.m., MW Network		Duquesne	W 78–75	8–3	16 – Comer	9 – Price	4 – Lowery	Lawlor Events Center (7,238); Reno, NV
Mountain West regular season
December 20, 2025; 7:00 p.m., MW Network		Boise State	W 81–66	9–3 (1–0)	24 – Comer	6 – Tied	4 – Comer	Lawlor Events Center (9,091); Reno, NV
December 30, 2025; 6:00 p.m., MW Network		at Colorado State	W 75–62	10–3 (2–0)	21 – Rolison	11 – Price	3 – Comer	Moby Arena (5,326); Fort Collins, CO
January 3, 2026; 4:00 p.m., MW Network		at Fresno State	W 66–65	11–3 (3–0)	15 – Price	9 – Price	3 – Comer	Save Mart Center (4,027); Fresno, CA
January 6, 2026; 8:00 p.m., FS1		San Diego State	L 68–73	11–4 (3–1)	17 – Price	10 – Price	3 – Tied	Lawlor Events Center (8,005); Reno, NV
January 10, 2026; 7:00 p.m., MW Network		Wyoming	W 92–83	12–4 (4–1)	31 – Camper Jr.	13 – Price	10 – Comer	Lawlor Events Center (9,083); Reno, NV
January 14, 2026; 7:00 p.m., CBSSN		at No. 23 Utah State	L 62–71	12–5 (4–2)	14 – Camper Jr.	11 – Price	3 – Comer	Smith Spectrum (10,270); Logan, UT
January 17, 2026; 1:00 p.m., MW Network		at Air Force	W 81–66	13–5 (5–2)	23 – Camper Jr.	9 – Camper Jr.	4 – Comer	Clune Arena (964); Colorado Springs, CO
January 20, 2026; 7:00 p.m., MW Network		San Jose State	W 87–54	14–5 (6–2)	19 – Camper Jr.	10 – Price	7 – Comer	Lawlor Events Center (7,852); Reno, NV
January 24, 2026; 5:00 p.m., FS1		at New Mexico	L 73–80	14–6 (6–3)	20 – Camper Jr.	11 – Price	4 – Comer	The Pit (14,639); Albuquerque, NM
January 27, 2026; 7:30 p.m., FS1		Grand Canyon	W 66–60 ^{OT}	15–6 (7–3)	18 – Bailey III	6 – Tied	5 – Camper Jr.	Lawlor Events Center (8,728); Reno, NV
January 30, 2026; 7:00 p.m., CBSSN		UNLV; Rivalry	W 89–76	16–6 (8–3)	32 – Camper Jr.	11 – Price	8 – Comer	Lawlor Events Center (11,997); Reno, NV
February 3, 2026; 6:00 p.m., MW Network		at Boise State	L 87–91 ^{OT}	16–7 (8–4)	35 – Camper Jr.	9 – Price	4 – Comer	ExtraMile Arena (9,224); Boise, ID
February 7, 2026; 7:00 p.m., MW Network		Fresno State	W 69–59	17–7 (9–4)	15 – Tied	9 – Lowery	5 – Rolison	Lawlor Events Center (10,032); Reno, NV
February 14, 2026; 7:00 p.m., CBSSN		at San Diego State	L 57–71	17–8 (9–5)	17 – Price	10 – Price	2 – Tied	Viejas Arena (12,414); San Diego, CA
February 17, 2026; 7:00 p.m., MW Network		at San Jose State	L 71–87	17–9 (9–6)	18 – Camper Jr.	7 – Price	4 – Tied	Provident Credit Union Event Center (2,261); San Jose, CA
February 21, 2026; 7:00 p.m., FS1		Utah State	W 80–77	18–9 (10–6)	20 – Camper Jr.	12 – Price	7 – Comer	Lawlor Events Center (11,057); Reno, NV
February 24, 2025; 8:00 p.m., CBSSN		New Mexico	W 67−60	19−9 (11−6)	21 – Price	12 – Price	5 – Tied	Lawlor Events Center (8,020); Reno, NV
February 28, 2026; 7:00 p.m., CBSSN		at UNLV; Rivalry	L 83–85 ^{OT}	19−10 (11−7)	30 – Weems	9 – Weems	5 – Camper Jr.	Thomas & Mack Center; Paradise, NV
March 3, 2026; 7:00 p.m., MW Network		at Wyoming	L 73–83	19−11 (11−8)	20 – Price	6 – Weems	4 – Rolison	Arena-Auditorium (3,478); Laramie, WY
March 7, 2026; 7:00 p.m., MW Network		Air Force	W 74–59	20−11 (12−8)	18 – Camper Jr.	9 – Lowery	3 – Tied	Lawlor Events Center (10,435); Reno, NV
Mountain West tournament
March 11, 2026; 2:30 p.m., MW Network	(5)	vs. (12) Air Force; First round	W 80–45	21–11	11 – Camper Jr.	5 – Tied	4 – Lowery	Thomas & Mack Center (2,770); Paradise, NV
March 12, 2026; 2:30 p.m., CBSSN	(5)	vs. (4) Grand Canyon; Quarterfinals	W 84–80	22–11	27 – Camper Jr.	7 – Weems	3 – Price	Thomas & Mack Center (6,911); Paradise, NV
March 13, 2026; 6:30 p.m., CBSSN	(5)	vs. (1) Utah State; Semifinals	L 66–79	22–12	17 – Weems	9 – Weems	3 – Tied	Thomas & Mack Center; Paradise, NV
NIT
March 18, 2026; 7:00 p.m., ESPN+	(2 AU)	Murray State; First round	W 89–75	23–12	23 – Weems	13 – Price	5 – Camper Jr.	Lawlor Events Center (5,588); Reno, NV
March 21, 2026; 6:00 p.m., ESPN+	(2 AU)	Liberty; Second round	W 73–63	24–12	15 – Price	13 – Camper Jr.	10 – Camper Jr.	Lawlor Events Center (4,616); Reno, NV
March 25, 2026; 6:00 p.m., ESPN2	(2 AU)	at (1 AU) Auburn; Quarterfinals	L 69–75	24–13	22 – Price	11 – Price	6 – Comer	Neville Arena (2,756); Auburn, AL
*Non-conference game. ^{#}Rankings from AP Poll. (#) Tournament seedings in parentheses. AU=Auburn. All times are in Pacific Time.
