= Sioux Falls Christian Schools =

Coordinates: 43°29′18.8″N 96°41′59″W

Location
- 6120 S. Charger Circle; Sioux Falls, South Dakota 57108; United States

Information
- School type: Conservative
- Motto: LOVE.GROW.GO.GLORIFY
- Denomination: Strong Conservative Non Denominational protestant
- Established: 1958
- Principal: J. Vannieuwenhuyzen, J. Pettingill, K. Johnston, M. Baker
- Teaching staff: over 100 (as of 2022-23)
- Grades: PK-12
- Gender: all
- Enrollment: 1350 (as of 2019-20)
- Student to teacher ratio: 14.4 (as of 2007–08)
- Colors: Royal Blue, white, black, silver
- Mascot: Charger
- Website: www.siouxfallschristian.org

Sioux Falls Christian Schools (SFC) is a private school located in Sioux Falls, South Dakota. The school was founded in 1958 as an elementary school named Calvin Christian. Since its inception, SFC has expanded and currently offers programs from pre-kindergarten to 12th grade and is accredited by the state of South Dakota and Christian Schools International.

Sioux Falls Christian operates independently from the Harrisburg SD school district but receives some government funding. The school board president is Jonathan Bentz and the Superintendent is Jay Woudstra. The High School Principal is Jeremy Vannieuwenhuyzen, Middle School Principal is Jake Pettingill and Elementary Principal is Kym Johnston.

Doctrine: Orthodox Protestant doctrine, TULIP calvinist, and evangelical.

== Academics ==
Sioux Falls Christian is strong academically as the students have scored well above the state and national averages on ACT scores. SFC currently offers AP courses in physics, English, calculus, US History, Government, Statistics, Biology, and Spanish. Students can also participate in music, drama, cheerleading, dance and oral interp. Over 60% of the teachers have a master's degree in education. Student Grade Point Average is calculated including non academic courses such as, band, art, STEM, and Bible classes.

== Facilities ==
In 2004, the Sioux Falls Christian Middle and High Schools moved from the old building on Sycamore Avenue to the new $10.2 million, 100,000-square-foot (9,300 m^{2}) building on the Charger Campus near 69th Street and Cliff Avenue. In 2007, the elementary school moved from its Sneve Campus onto the same campus after a $7.5 million expansion.

Sioux Falls Christian shares their outdoor athletic facilities with the University of Sioux Falls at the (projected) $14 million Sanford Health Sports Complex. The sports complex is adjacent to the high school campus and has state-of-the-art synthetic turf football and soccer fields as well as track and field facilities.

== Athletics ==
SFC offers the following Men's sports: Soccer, football, cross country, basketball, golf, tennis, and track. SFC offers the following Women's sports: soccer, volleyball, cross country, basketball, golf, track, and cheer leading. The athletic teams are called the Chargers.

Chargers logo

The athletic teams have a number of state championships. The first championship came in 1981 when the boys team won the Class B state cross country meet (and SFC alumnus Todd DeGroot was State Champion). The girls' track team was Class B runner-up and champion in 1984, 1985, 2013, and 2014, respectively. The boys' Cross Country team also won state again in 2016, 2019 and 2020. The girls placed 10th at State (first qualification since 1983!) in 2015 and have gone on to place at the state meet each year since. They won their first championship in 2022.

The girls' volleyball team won the Class A state championship in 2007, 2010, 2011, 2012, 2014, 2015, 2017, 2018, 2019, 2020, 2021, and 2022. They were runner-up in Class B in 1992 and '95 and runner-up in Class A in 2002 (fall) and 2003.

The boys' track team won the Class A state title in 2008 and again in 2017. The boys' track team has also finished as the state runner up in 2016, 2018 and 2019. The girls' golf team won their first state championship in 2011 and went runner up in 2013, 2014, and 2018 under coach Don Garnaas. The boys' golf team won the 2005 through 2007 Class B titles and the 2008, 2009 and 2010 Class A titles. The boys' golf team won its first class A state championship in 2019 and its second championship in 2020. The boys' basketball team won state championships in 2016 and 2021. The boys' soccer team won state titles in 2005, 2007, 2008, 2015, 2020, 2021, 2022, and 2023 and placed second in 2000, 2004, 2009, 2014, 2018 and 2019. They placed third in 2010. The football team won the 11B state championship in 2017 and 2018. The boys' tennis won their first championship in 2021.

== Fine Arts ==
SFC offers a number of fine arts activities including: debate, oral interpretation, one act, spring play (every other year), musical (every other year), quiz bowl, concert choir, chamber choir, all-state choir, men's barbershop, women's a capella, concert band, jazz band, marching band, all-state band, all-state orchestra, as well as art classes.
