= Senior day =

Sports term

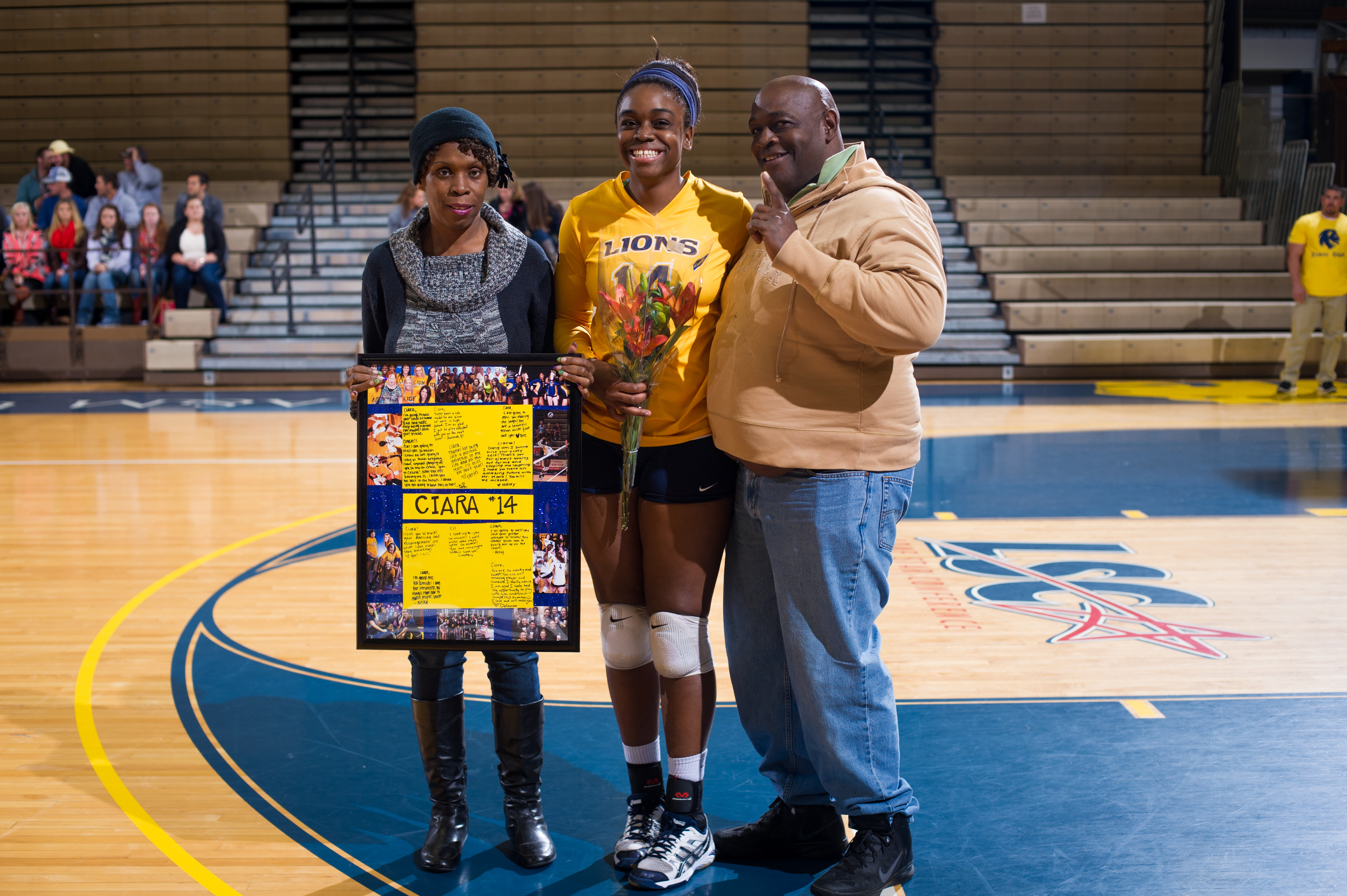
Typical senior day recognition, this time for the 2013 Texas A&M–Commerce Lions women's volleyball team.

Senior day or senior night (depending on the time the game is held) is a term used in high school sports and college sports, most notably football and basketball, to describe the team's last regular season home game of the season. At some point before or after the game or at halftime, a ceremony is held bidding the team's seniors farewell, as it is their last game in front of their home fans.
