= List of Belmont Bruins men's basketball head coaches =

The following is a list of Belmont Bruins men's basketball head coaches. The Bruins have had 10 coaches in their 71-season history.

Belmont's current head coach is Casey Alexander. He was hired in April 2019 to replace Rick Byrd, who retired in 2019 after 33 years as the Bruins' head coach.

No.	Tenure	Coach	Years	Record	Pct.
1	1952–1956	Larry Striplin	4	58–42	.580
2	1956–1962	George Kelley	6	58–71	.450
3	1962–1964; 1972–1974	Ken Sidwell	4	36–53	.404
4	1964–1966	Wayne Dobbs	2	35–19	.648
5	1966–1967	Jack Young	1	9–16	.360
6	1967–1972	Dewey Jones	5	69–76	.476
7	1974–1978	Dick Campbell	4	48–68	.414
8	1978–1986	Don Purdy	8	116–138	.457
9	1986–2019	Rick Byrd	33	713–346	.673
10	2019–2026	Casey Alexander	4	98–30	.766
11	2026–present	Evan Bradds	0	0–0	–
Totals		10 coaches	71 seasons	1,240–859	.591
Records updated through end of 2022–23 season Source
