= Brad Lundblade =

American football player (born 1995)

Profile
- Position: Center

Personal information
- Born: September 21, 1995 (age 31); Nashville, Tennessee, U.S.
- Listed height: 6 ft 3 in (1.91 m)
- Listed weight: 305 lb (138 kg)

Career information
- High school: Liberty Christian (Argyle, Texas)
- College: Oklahoma State (2014–2017)
- NFL draft: 2018: undrafted

Career history
- Seattle Seahawks (2018)*; Cincinnati Bengals (2018–2019)*; Carolina Panthers (2019); New York Jets (2019–2020)*; Seattle Seahawks (2020–2021)*
- * Offseason or practice squad member only
- Stats at Pro Football Reference

Bradford Ryan Lundblade (born September 21, 1995) is an American former professional football player who was a center in the National Football League (NFL) for 4 seasons. He played college football for the Oklahoma State Cowboys.

== Professional career ==
=== Seattle Seahawks ===
Lundblade was signed by the Seattle Seahawks as an undrafted free agent on May 4, 2018, but was waived three days later.

=== Cincinnati Bengals ===
On May 14, 2018, Lundblade was signed by the Cincinnati Bengals. He was waived on September 1, and was re-signed to the practice squad the next day. Lundblade signed a reserve/future contract with Cincinnati on December 31. He was waived by the Bengals on August 31, 2019.

=== Carolina Panthers ===
On September 3, 2019, Lundblade was signed to the Carolina Panthers practice squad. He was promoted to the active roster on November 29. Lundblade was waived by Carolina on December 5.

=== New York Jets ===
On December 9, 2019, Lundblade was signed to the New York Jets practice squad. He signed a reserve/future contract with the Jets on December 30. Lundblade was waived by New York on September 5, 2020.

=== Seattle Seahawks (second stint) ===
On November 23, 2020, Lundblade was signed to the Seattle Seahawks practice squad. On January 11, 2021, Lundblade signed a reserve/futures contract with the Seahawks.

On August 31, 2021, Lundblade was waived by the Seahawks. He was re-signed to the practice squad on October 27. He was released on November 4.

== Personal life ==
Lundblade's father Kirk played basketball at SMU while his brother Tyler played basketball at TCU, Belmont and Tennessee.
