= Striplin =

Striplin is a surname. Notable people with the surname include:

- Larry Striplin (1929–2012), American college basketball and baseball coach
- Sylvia Striplin (born 1954), American singer
