= 2003 NCAA Men's Basketball All-Americans =

- Awarded for: 2002–03 NCAA Division I men's basketball season

The Consensus 2003 College Basketball All-American team, as determined by aggregating the results of four major All-American teams. To earn "consensus" status, a player must win honors from a majority of the following teams: the Associated Press, the USBWA, The Sporting News and the National Association of Basketball Coaches.

== 2003 Consensus All-America team ==
Consensus First Team
Player	Position	Class	Team
Nick Collison	C	Senior	Kansas
T. J. Ford	G	Sophomore	Texas
Josh Howard	F-G	Senior	Wake Forest
Dwyane Wade	G	Junior	Marquette
David West	F	Senior	Xavier

Consensus Second Team
Player	Position	Class	Team
Carmelo Anthony	F	Freshman	Syracuse
Troy Bell	G	Senior	Boston College
Jason Gardner	G	Senior	Arizona
Kyle Korver	F	Senior	Creighton
Hollis Price	G	Senior	Oklahoma

== Individual All-America teams ==
All-America Team
All-America Team	First team		Second team		Third team	
All-America Team	Player	School	Player	School	Player	School
Associated Press	Nick Collison	Kansas	Carmelo Anthony	Syracuse	Keith Bogans	Kentucky
Associated Press	T. J. Ford	Texas	Troy Bell	Boston College	Brian Cook	Illinois
Associated Press	Josh Howard	Wake Forest	Jason Gardner	Arizona	Reece Gaines	Louisville
Associated Press	Dwyane Wade	Marquette	Kyle Korver	Creighton	Kirk Hinrich	Kansas
Associated Press	David West	Xavier	Hollis Price	Oklahoma	Ron Slay	Tennessee
USBWA	Nick Collison	Kansas	Carmelo Anthony	Syracuse	No third team	
USBWA	T. J. Ford	Texas	Troy Bell	Boston College	No third team	
USBWA	Hollis Price	Oklahoma	Jason Gardner	Arizona	No third team	
USBWA	Dwyane Wade	Marquette	Josh Howard	Wake Forest	No third team	
USBWA	David West	Xavier	Kyle Korver	Creighton	No third team	
NABC	Nick Collison	Kansas	Carmelo Anthony	Syracuse	Brian Cook	Illinois
NABC	T. J. Ford	Texas	Keith Bogans	Kentucky	Reece Gaines	Louisville
NABC	Josh Howard	Wake Forest	Jason Gardner	Arizona	Kirk Hinrich	Kansas
NABC	Hollis Price	Oklahoma	Michael Sweetney	Georgetown	Kyle Korver	Creighton
NABC	David West	Xavier	Dwyane Wade	Marquette	Emeka Okafor	Connecticut
Sporting News	Carmelo Anthony	Syracuse	Troy Bell	Boston College	Keith Bogans	Kentucky
Sporting News	T. J. Ford	Texas	Nick Collison	Kansas	Reece Gaines	Louisville
Sporting News	Josh Howard	Wake Forest	Brian Cook	Illinois	Kirk Hinrich	Kansas
Sporting News	Dwyane Wade	Marquette	Hollis Price	Oklahoma	Luke Ridnour	Oregon
Sporting News	David West	Xavier	Kyle Korver	Creighton	Michael Sweetney	Georgetown

AP Honorable Mention:

- Mario Austin, Mississippi State
- Marcus Banks, UNLV
- Steve Blake, Maryland
- Brett Blizzard, UNC Wilmington
- Matt Bonner, Florida
- Jermaine Boyette, Weber State
- Gregory Burks, Prairie View A&M
- Torrey Butler, Coastal Carolina
- Matt Carroll, Notre Dame
- Donald Cole, Sam Houston State
- Taylor Coppenrath, Vermont
- Ike Diogu, Arizona State
- Ruben Douglas, New Mexico
- Luis Flores, Manhattan
- Branduinn Fullove, UC Santa Barbara
- Antonio Gates, Kent State
- Willie Green, Detroit
- Jermaine Hall, Wagner
- Jarvis Hayes, Georgia
- Mike Helms, Oakland
- Dahntay Jones, Duke
- Chris Kaman, Central Michigan
- Brandin Knight, Pittsburgh
- Ricky Minard, Morehead State
- James Moore, New Mexico State
- Jameer Nelson, Saint Joseph's
- Emeka Okafor, Connecticut
- Ugonna Onyekwe, Penn
- Kirk Penney, Wisconsin
- Luke Ridnour, Oregon
- Quinton Ross, SMU
- Joe Shipp, California
- Adam Sonn, Belmont
- Blake Stepp, Gonzaga
- Michael Sweetney, Georgetown
- Chris Thomas, Notre Dame
- Luke Walton, Arizona
- Patrick Whearty, Holy Cross
- Troy Wheless, College of Charleston
- Ron Williamson, Howard
