= 2016 NCAA Men's Basketball All-Americans =

Sports tram

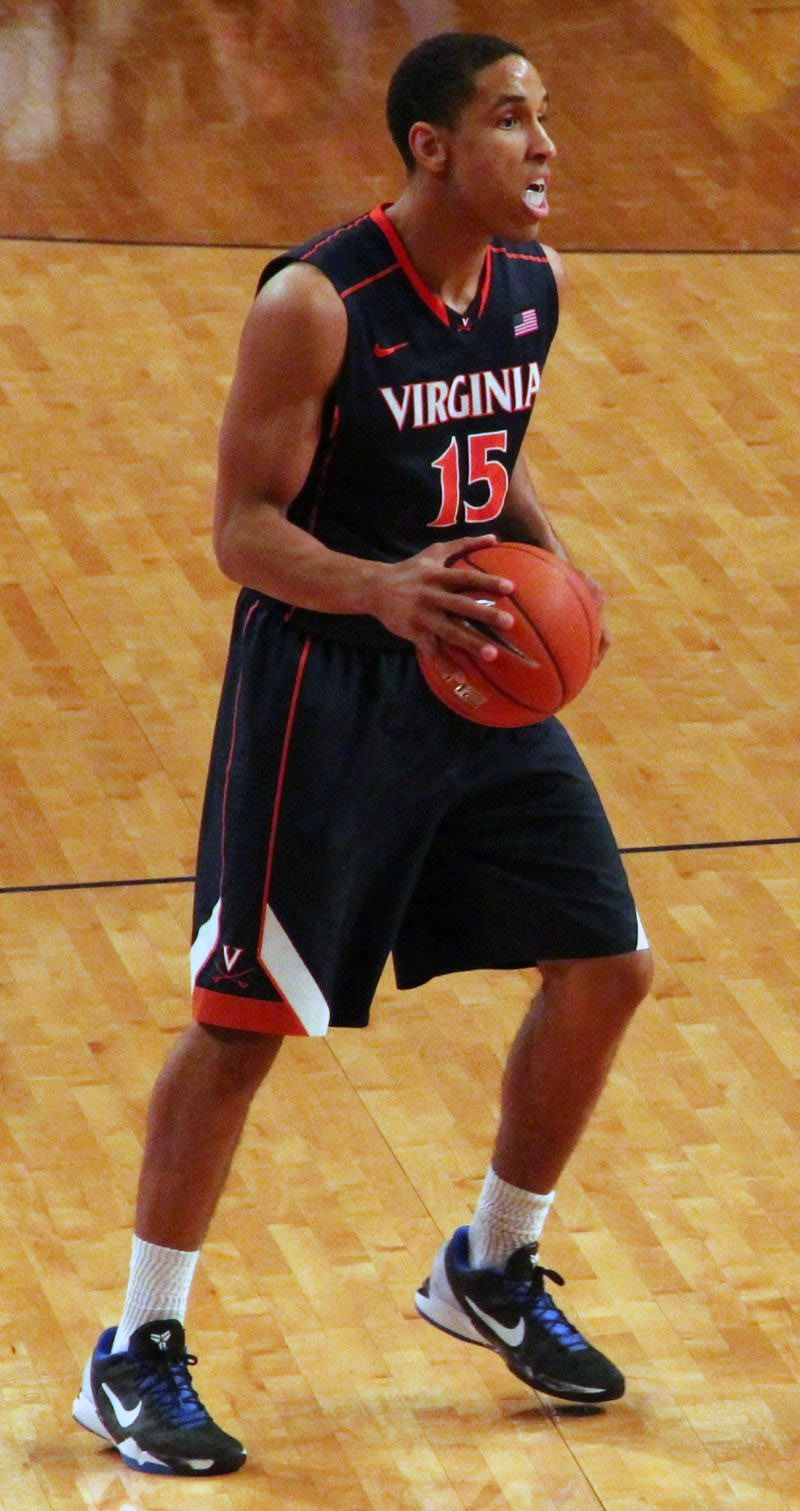
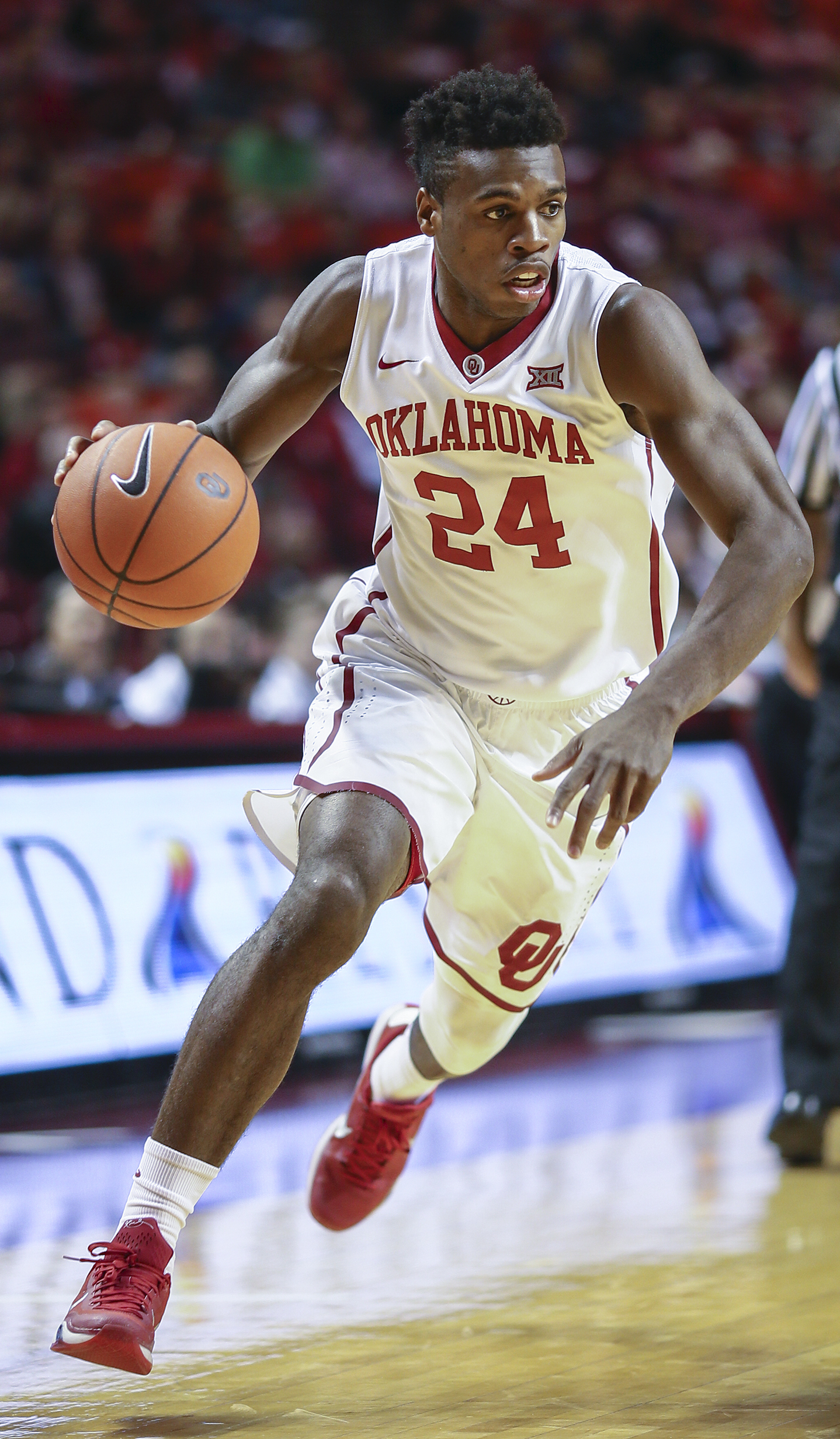
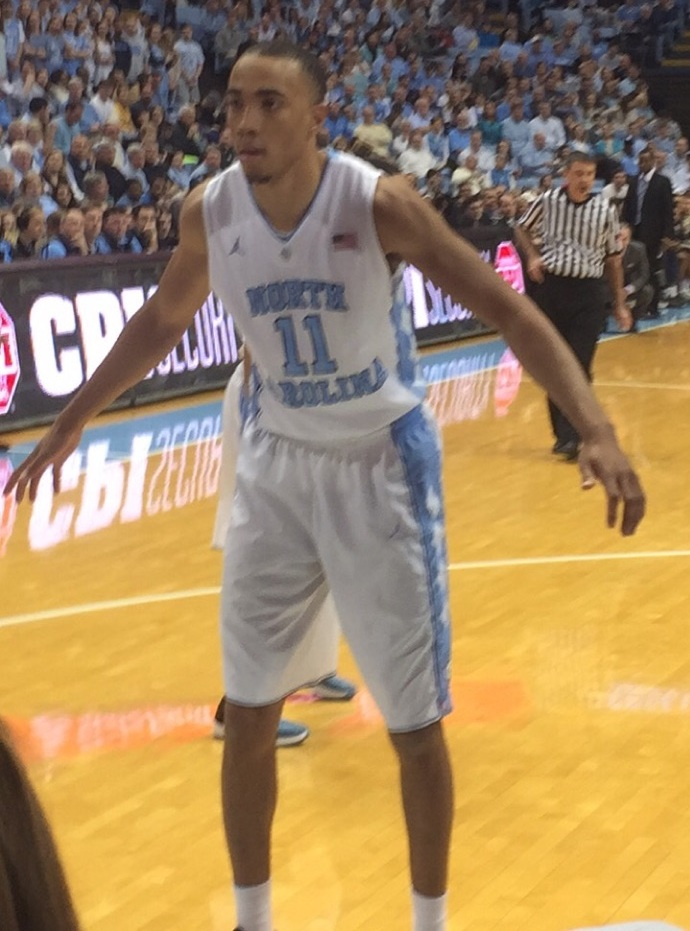
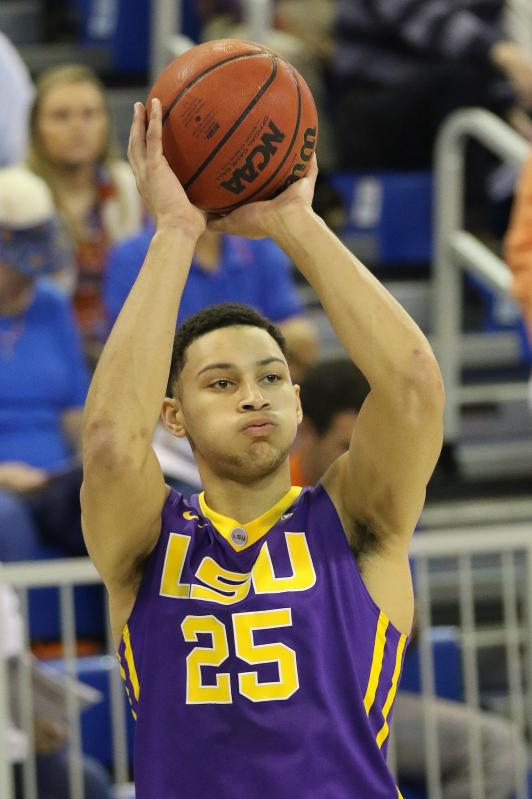
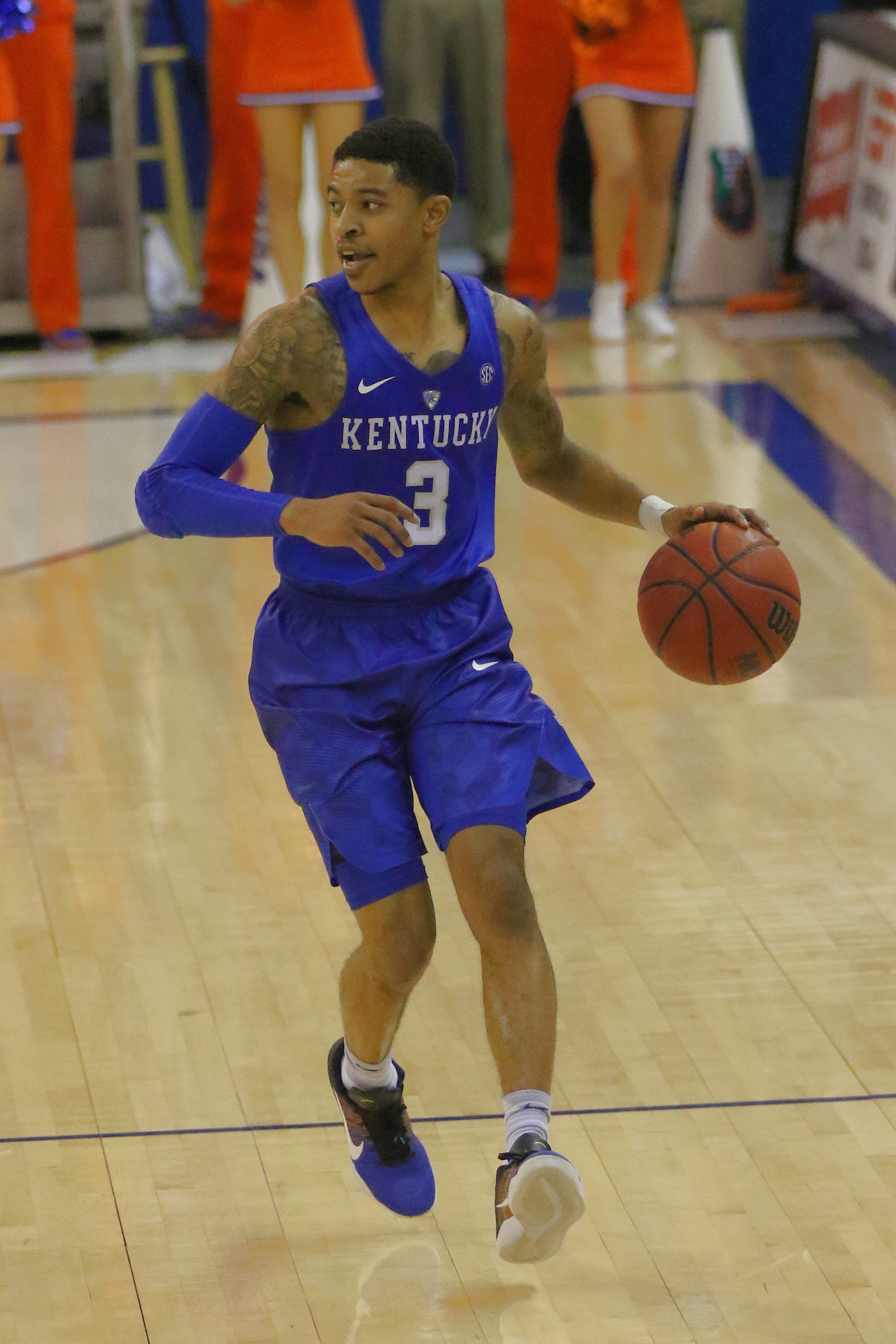
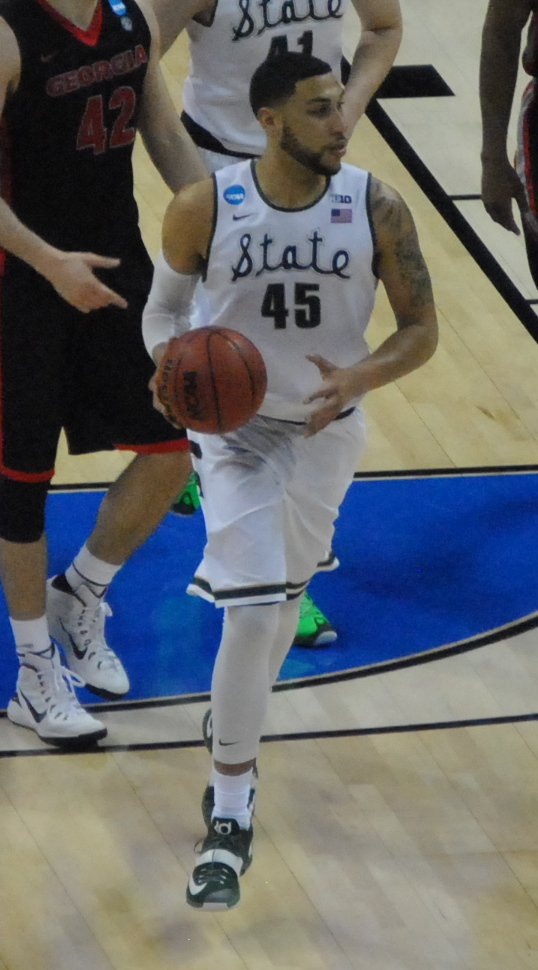
- The 2016 consensus first team. Clockwise from top left: Brogdon, Hield, Johnson, Valentine, Ulis, Simmons.
- Awarded for: 2015–16 NCAA Division I men's basketball season

An All-American team is an honorary sports team composed of the best amateur players of a specific season for each team position—who in turn are given the honorific "All-America" and typically referred to as "All-American athletes", or simply "All-Americans". Although the honorees generally do not compete together as a unit, the term is used in U.S. team sports to refer to players who are selected by members of the national media. Walter Camp selected the first All-America team in the early days of American football in 1889. The 2016 NCAA Men's Basketball All-Americans are honorary lists that include All-American selections from the Associated Press (AP), the United States Basketball Writers Association (USBWA), the Sporting News (TSN), and the National Association of Basketball Coaches (NABC) for the 2015–16 NCAA Division I men's basketball season. All selectors choose at least a first and second 5-man team. The NABC, TSN and AP choose third teams, while AP also lists honorable mention selections.

The Consensus 2016 College Basketball All-American team is determined by aggregating the results of the four major All-American teams as determined by the National Collegiate Athletic Association (NCAA). Since United Press International was replaced by TSN in 1997, the four major selectors have been the aforementioned ones. AP has been a selector since 1948, NABC since 1957 and USBWA since 1960. To earn "consensus" status, a player must win honors based on a point system computed from the four different all-America teams. The point system consists of three points for first team, two points for second team and one point for third team. No honorable mention or fourth team or lower are used in the computation. The top five totals plus ties are first team and the next five plus ties are second team.

Although the aforementioned lists are used to determine consensus honors, there are numerous other All-American lists. The ten finalists for the John Wooden Award are described as Wooden All-Americans. The ten finalists for the Senior CLASS Award are described as Senior All-Americans. Other All-American lists include those determined by USA Today, Fox Sports, Yahoo! Sports and many others. The scholar-athletes selected by College Sports Information Directors of America (CoSIDA) are termed Academic All-Americans.

== 2016 Consensus All-America team ==
PG – Point guard
SG – Shooting guard
PF – Power forward
SF – Small forward
C – Center

Consensus First Team
Player	Position	Class	Team
Malcolm Brogdon	SG	Senior	Virginia
Buddy Hield	SG	Senior	Oklahoma
Brice Johnson	PF	Senior	North Carolina
Ben Simmons	F	Freshman	Louisiana State
Tyler Ulis	PG	Sophomore	Kentucky
Denzel Valentine	SG	Senior	Michigan State

Consensus Second Team
Player	Position	Class	Team
Kris Dunn	PG	Junior	Providence
Perry Ellis	PF	Senior	Kansas
Georges Niang	PF/SF	Senior	Iowa State
Jakob Pöltl	C	Sophomore	Utah
Jarrod Uthoff	PF	Senior	Iowa

== Individual All-America teams ==
=== By player ===
Player	School	AP	USBWA	NABC	TSN	CP	Notes
Malcolm Brogdon	Virginia	1	1	1	1	12	NABC Defensive Player of the Year
Buddy Hield	Oklahoma	1	1	1	1	12	Sporting News Player of the Year
Denzel Valentine	Michigan State	1	1	1	1	12	NABC Player of the Year
Brice Johnson	North Carolina	1	1	1	3	10	
Ben Simmons	Louisiana State	2	1	1	2	10	USBWA National Freshman of the Year
Tyler Ulis	Kentucky	1	2	2	1	10	
Jakob Pöltl	Utah	2	2	2	1	9	
Kris Dunn	Providence	2	2	2	2	8	
Georges Niang	Iowa State	2	2	2	3	7	
Jarrod Uthoff	Iowa	3	2	3	2	6	
Perry Ellis	Kansas	2		2	3	5	
Grayson Allen	Duke	3		3	2	4	
Yogi Ferrell	Indiana	3		3	2	4	
Kay Felder	Oakland	3		3	3	3	
Dillon Brooks	Oregon				3	1	
Josh Hart	Villanova			3		1	
Jamal Murray	Kentucky	3				1	

=== By team ===
All-America Team
All-America Team	First team		Second team		Third team	
All-America Team	Player	School	Player	School	Player	School
Associated Press	Malcolm Brogdon	Virginia	Kris Dunn	Providence	Grayson Allen	Duke
Associated Press	Buddy Hield	Oklahoma	Perry Ellis	Kansas	Kay Felder	Oakland
Associated Press	Brice Johnson	North Carolina	Georges Niang	Iowa State	Yogi Ferrell	Indiana
Associated Press	Tyler Ulis	Kentucky	Jakob Pöltl	Utah	Jamal Murray	Kentucky
Associated Press	Denzel Valentine	Michigan State	Ben Simmons	Louisiana State	Jarrod Uthoff	Iowa
USBWA	Malcolm Brogdon	Virginia	Kris Dunn	Providence	No third team	
USBWA	Buddy Hield	Oklahoma	Georges Niang	Iowa State	No third team	
USBWA	Brice Johnson	North Carolina	Jakob Pöltl	Utah	No third team	
USBWA	Ben Simmons	Louisiana State	Tyler Ulis	Kentucky	No third team	
USBWA	Denzel Valentine	Michigan State	Jarrod Uthoff	Iowa	No third team	
NABC	Malcolm Brogdon	Virginia	Kris Dunn	Providence	Grayson Allen	Duke
NABC	Buddy Hield	Oklahoma	Perry Ellis	Kansas	Kay Felder	Oakland
NABC	Brice Johnson	North Carolina	Georges Niang	Iowa State	Yogi Ferrell	Indiana
NABC	Ben Simmons	Louisiana State	Jakob Pöltl	Utah	Josh Hart	Villanova
NABC	Denzel Valentine	Michigan State	Tyler Ulis	Kentucky	Jarrod Uthoff	Iowa
Sporting News	Malcolm Brogdon	Virginia	Grayson Allen	Duke	Dillon Brooks	Oregon
Sporting News	Buddy Hield	Oklahoma	Kris Dunn	Providence	Perry Ellis	Kansas
Sporting News	Jakob Pöltl	Utah	Yogi Ferrell	Indiana	Kay Felder	Oakland
Sporting News	Tyler Ulis	Kentucky	Ben Simmons	Louisiana State	Brice Johnson	North Carolina
Sporting News	Denzel Valentine	Michigan State	Jarrod Uthoff	Iowa	Georges Niang	Iowa State

AP Honorable Mention:

- Josh Adams, Wyoming
- Ryan Anderson, Arizona
- Cat Barber, NC State
- DeAndre' Bembry, Saint Joseph's
- Ben Bentil, Providence
- Trevon Bluiett, Xavier
- Joel Bolomboy, Weber State
- Evan Bradds, Belmont
- Dillon Brooks, Oregon
- Cane Broome, Sacred Heart
- John Brown, High Point
- Antonio Campbell, Ohio
- Kyle Collinsworth, BYU
- Stephen Croone, Furman
- James Daniel III, Howard
- Juan'ya Green, Hofstra
- Derrick Griffin, Texas Southern
- Alex Hamilton, Louisiana Tech
- A. J. Hammons, Purdue
- Marvelle Harris, Fresno State
- Josh Hart, Villanova
- Danuel House, Texas A&M
- Brandon Ingram, Duke
- Stefan Janković, Hawaii
- Tim Kempton Jr., Lehigh
- Max Landis, IPFW
- Shawn Long, Louisiana–Lafayette
- Dallas Moore, North Florida
- Nic Moore, SMU
- Gary Payton II, Oregon State
- Alec Peters, Valparaiso
- Justin Robinson, Monmouth
- Domantas Sabonis, Gonzaga
- Justin Sears, Yale
- Pascal Siakam, New Mexico State
- Melo Trimble, Maryland
- Fred VanVleet, Wichita State
- Thomas Walkup, Stephen F. Austin
- Jameel Warney, Stony Brook
- Isaiah Whitehead, Seton Hall
- Kyle Wiltjer, Gonzaga

== Academic All-Americans ==
On March 3, 2016, CoSIDA and Capital One announced the 2016 Academic All-America team, with Jarrod Uthoff headlining the University Division as the men's college basketball Academic All-American of the Year. The following is the 2015–16 Academic All-America Men's Basketball Team (University Division) as selected by CoSIDA:

First Team
Player	School	Class	GPA and major
Canyon Barry (2)	Charleston	Jr.	4.00 Physics / computer science
Joshua Braun	Grand Canyon	Sr.	3.83 Business management
Shavon Shields (1)	Nebraska	Sr.	3.72 Biological Sciences
Marcus Paige (2, *)	North Carolina	Sr.	3.43 Media & journalism / history
Jarrod Uthoff	Iowa	Gr.	3.42 Economics (UG) / leisure studies (G)

Second Team
Player	School	Class	GPA and major
Grayson Allen	Duke	So.	3.39 Psychology
Craig Bradshaw (3)	Belmont	Sr.	3.47 Public relations
Mike Gesell (3)	Iowa	Gr.	3.94 Finance (UG) / leisure studies (G)
Alex Poythress	Kentucky	Sr.	3.52 Business & mktg. (UG) / sport leadership (G)
Domantas Sabonis	Gonzaga	So.	3.46 Sport management

Third Team
Player	School	Class	GPA and major
Kale Abrahamson	Drake	Gr.	3.91 Psychology (UG) / MBA
Evan Bradds	Belmont	Jr.	3.53 Finance
Derrick Henry	Citadel	Gr.	3.71 Business administration
A. J. Jacobson	North Dakota State	So.	3.99 Zoology / pre-dentistry
Paul Miller	North Dakota State	So.	3.82 Accounting

(1) = 2014–15 CoSIDA Academic All-America Division I first team
(2) = 2014–15 CoSIDA Academic All-America Division I second team
(3) = 2014–15 CoSIDA Academic All-America Division I third team
(*) = 2013–14 CoSIDA Academic All-America Division I second team

== Senior All-Americans ==
The ten finalists for the Senior CLASS Award are called Senior All-Americans. The 10 honorees are as follows:

Player	Position	School
Ryan Arcidiacono	Guard	Villanova
Malcolm Brogdon	Guard	Virginia
Perry Ellis	Forward	Kansas
Buddy Hield	Guard	Oklahoma
Georges Niang	Forward	Iowa State
Marcus Paige	Guard	North Carolina
Justin Sears	Forward	Yale
Denzel Valentine	Guard	Michigan State
Fred VanVleet	Point Guard	Wichita State
Kyle Wiltjer	Forward	Gonzaga
