= Caleb Swanigan =

American basketball player (1997–2022)

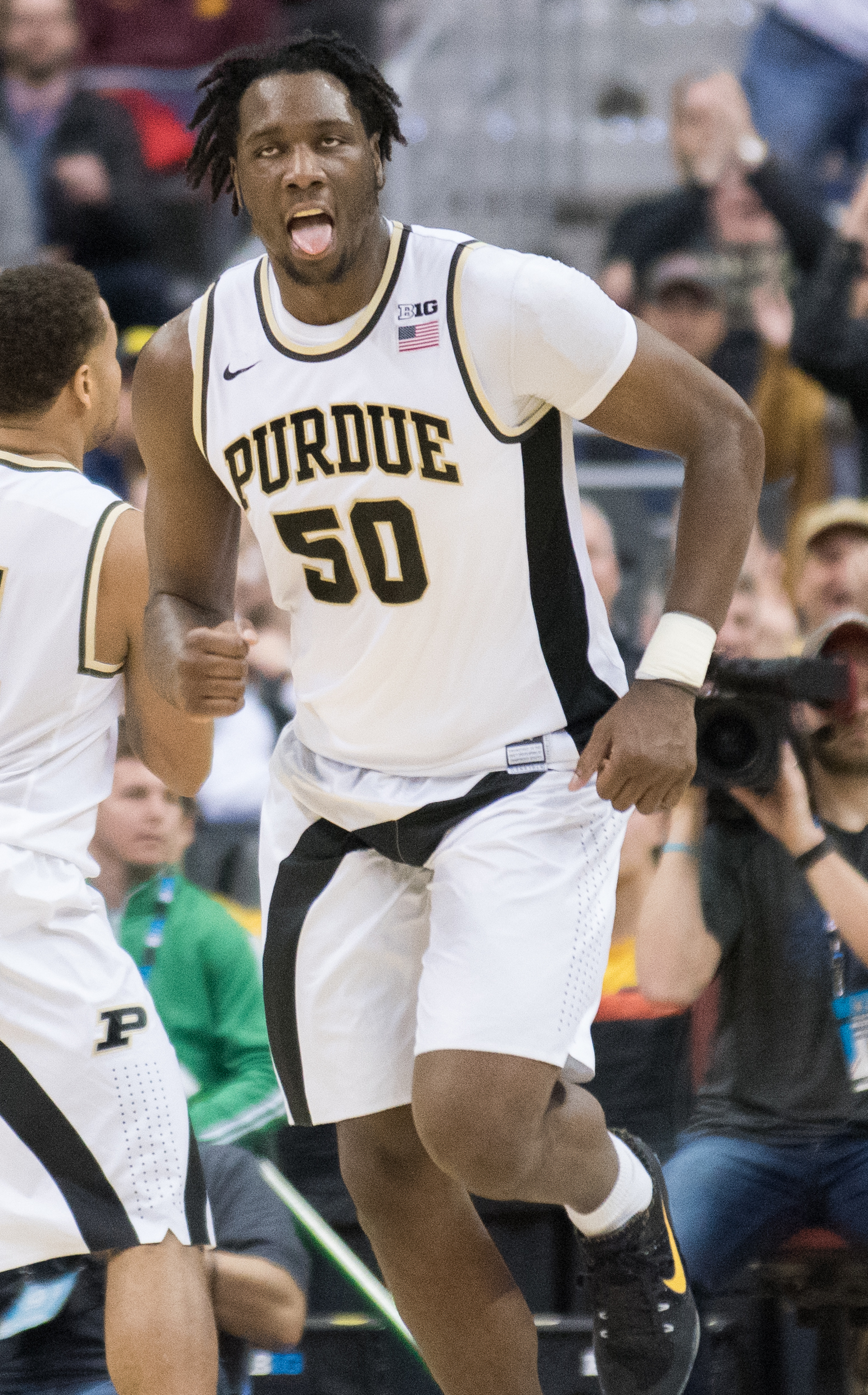
- Swanigan with the Purdue Boilermakers in 2017

Personal information
- Born: April 18, 1997 Indianapolis, Indiana, U.S.
- Died: June 20, 2022 (aged 25) Fort Wayne, Indiana, U.S.
- Listed height: 6 ft 9 in (2.06 m)
- Listed weight: 260 lb (118 kg)

Career information
- High school: Homestead (Fort Wayne, Indiana)
- College: Purdue (2015–2017)
- NBA draft: 2017: 1st round, 26th overall pick
- Drafted by: Portland Trail Blazers
- Playing career: 2017–2020
- Position: Power forward / center
- Number: 50

Career history
- 2017–2019: Portland Trail Blazers
- 2017–2018: →Canton Charge
- 2018–2019: →Texas Legends
- 2019–2020: Sacramento Kings
- 2019: →Stockton Kings
- 2020: Portland Trail Blazers

Career highlights
- Consensus first-team All-American (2017); Pete Newell Big Man Award (2017); Lute Olson Award (2017); Big Ten Player of the Year (2017); First-team All-Big Ten (2017); Big Ten All-Freshman team (2016); McDonald's All-American (2015); First-team Parade All-American (2015); Indiana Mr. Basketball (2015)

Career NBA statistics
- Points: 169 (2.3 ppg)
- Rebounds: 218 (2.9 rpg)
- Assists: 56 (0.7 apg)
- Stats at NBA.com
- Stats at Basketball Reference
Medals
Men's basketball
Representing the United States
FIBA U19 World Championship
Gold medal – first place	2015 Greece	National team
FIBA U17 World Championship
Gold medal – first place	2014 Dubai	National team

Caleb Sylvester Swanigan (April 18, 1997 – June 20, 2022) was an American professional basketball player in the National Basketball Association (NBA). He played college basketball for the Purdue Boilermakers. He was ranked among the top prep players in the national class of 2015 by Rivals.com, Scout.com and ESPN. He completed his senior season in the 2014–15 academic year for Homestead High School in Fort Wayne, Indiana, who went on to win the first state championship in the school's history. Swanigan was named Indiana's Mr. Basketball and a McDonald's All-American.

Swanigan originally committed to Michigan State University, but later decommitted and committed to Purdue University. He was named Big Ten Freshman of the Week three times, a record at Purdue. He was also named to the Big Ten All-Freshman Team and also received a National Freshman of the Week award. Swanigan finished the season with 10.2 points per game and 8.3 rebounds per game.

During his sophomore year, Swanigan was named the Big Ten Player of the Year and first-team All-Big Ten, and was a unanimous first-team All-American. He was a finalist for the 2017 Karl Malone Award, given to the nation's top power forward. He was selected 26th overall in the first round of the 2017 NBA draft by the Portland Trail Blazers. Over his three-year NBA career, Swanigan had two stints with the Trail Blazers; he also played for the Sacramento Kings.

== Early life ==
Swanigan grew up in an unstable home due to his father, Carl Swanigan Sr., who had a crack cocaine addiction. Swanigan's mother, Tanya, had six children. Swanigan moved between Utah and Indianapolis during his youth, spending time in homeless shelters.

Swanigan inherited two key features from his biological father—height and a tendency to obesity. The elder Swanigan, who died in 2014 from complications from diabetes, was 6 ft 8 in (2.03 m) and weighed nearly 500 pounds (230 kg) at his death. By the time Swanigan was entering eighth grade, he was 6 ft 2 in (1.88 m) and 360 pounds (160 kg). His father had many brushes with the law, battled drug addiction for most of his adult life, and physically assaulted his wife. According to a story in Bleacher Report, Swanigan was accidentally dropped by his mother as an infant, leaving a bruise on his face; this incident led her to move with her children to Salt Lake City. For the next decade, the family bounced between Indianapolis and Utah; he recalled that he lived in five different homeless shelters and attended 13 different schools by the time he was 13.

When his mother decided to move the family to Houston, his older brother Carl Jr., concerned that Caleb would keep gaining weight if he moved with his mother, called his former AAU basketball coach, Roosevelt Barnes, a former three-sport star at Purdue who played on the school's 1980 Final Four team and now a successful sports agent. Barnes, living in Fort Wayne, Indiana, agreed to take Caleb in if he could adopt him and raise him as his own son. Barnes adopted Swanigan prior to his 8th-grade year. Barnes addressed Swanigan's eating habits and, after receiving clearance from a cardiologist, began putting him through workouts similar to those Barnes himself went through in college. By the time Swanigan finished high school, he had slimmed down to 260 pounds (120 kg).

== High school career ==
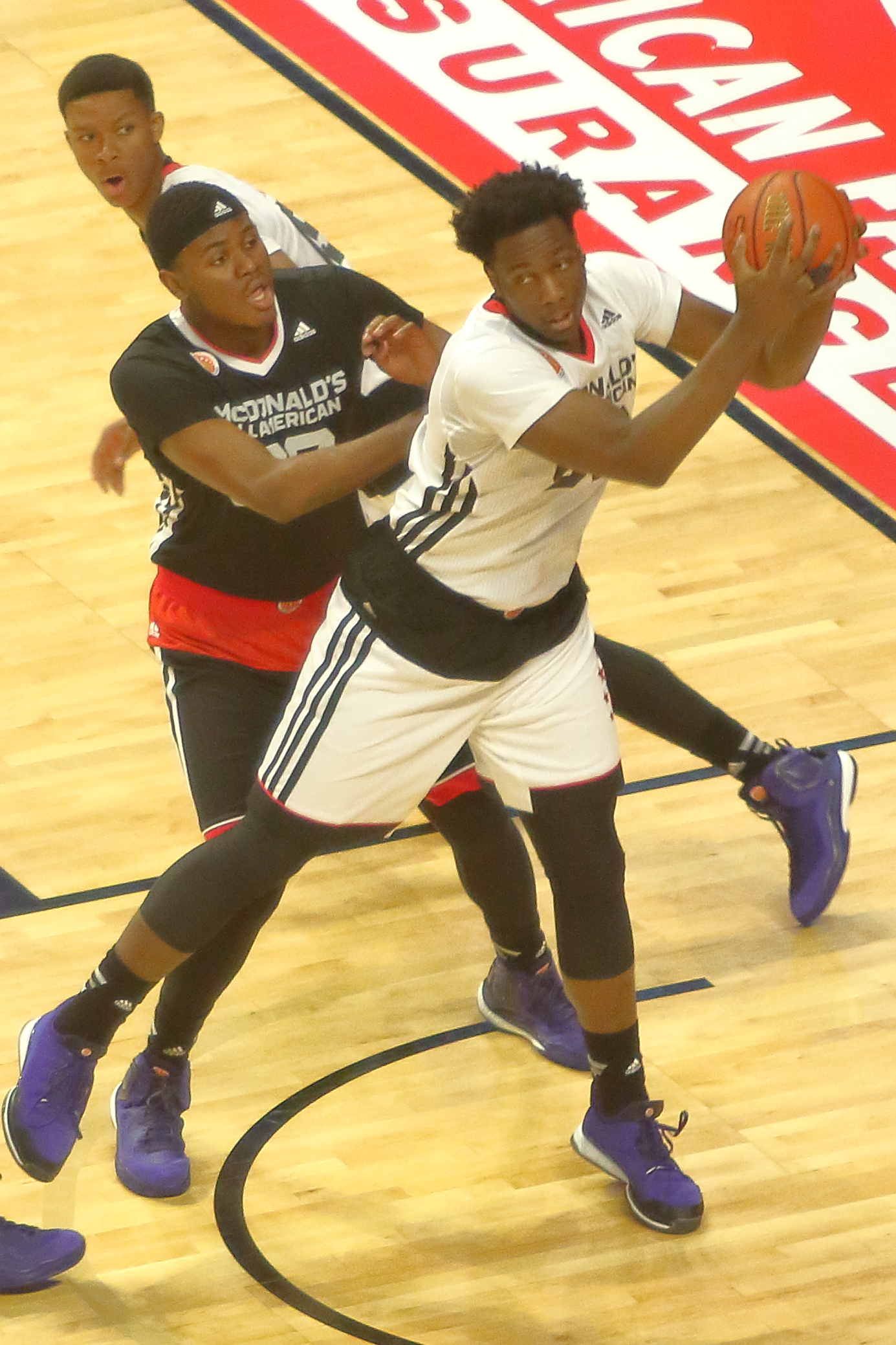
Swanigan in the McDonald's All-American Game in 2015

In the fall of 2011, Swanigan attended a basketball camp led by NBA former coach John Lucas after Roosevelt Barnes convinced Lucas to let him into the invite-only camp in Louisville. When it came to selecting his high school, Swanigan's guardian Barnes said, "When he chose his high school, his high school had never really done much in the tournament, and his goal was to win a state championship at a school where that had never been done before." Swanigan attended Homestead High School and wore the same number as Barnes, number 44.

As a senior, he was named Indiana Mr. Basketball and led Homestead to its first-ever state title. He was ranked as a top-20 national prospect in his class. He was named a McDonald's All-American. Swanigan averaged 22.6 points and 13.7 rebounds as a senior. Academically, Swanigan maintained a 3.1 GPA and graduated in three years instead of the usual four.

Swanigan finished his career at Homestead with records for career points (1,649) and rebounds (1,048), as well as the single-season points (704) and rebounding records (424). He was also second all time for career blocks (106) and assists (204).

== National team career ==
Swanigan qualified for the 2014 U17 World Championship Team, beating out twenty other players vying for a spot to make the 12-man squad. Swanigan played in the U17 World Championship Game. The team finished with a 7–0 record and earned a gold medal in Dubai, United Arab Emirates, extending the USA's total record at the U17 World Championship Game to 23–0. He finished the series with 8.0 points per game and 5.7 rebounds per game, and was the most efficient player on the U17 team, with a 69.6 shooting percentage.

Before starting his freshman season at Purdue, on June 18, 2015, Swanigan was announced as a member of the 12-man 2015 USA Basketball Men's U19 World Championship Team for the 2015 FIBA Under-19 World Championship that won a gold medal in Heraklion, Crete. On making the team, Swanigan said, "I always set goals for myself. I set goals for this spring. One of my goals is to make this team to end my high school career." To prepare for the games, Swanigan played in the Nike Hoop Summit, the McDonald's All American Game, and the Jordan Brand Classic. Swanigan did not take part in the Indiana-Kentucky All Star Game so he could attend the U19 training camp. He was one of five players returning from the gold medal-winning U17 squad. Swanigan's teammate Vince Edwards was also in the running to make the team, but was cut at the round of 16. The team finished 7–0, and Swanigan averaged 6.1 points and 4.4 rebounds per game.

== College career ==
=== Recruiting ===
Swanigan had several teams recruit him and offer scholarships; Arizona, Kentucky, Cal and Duke were among the schools that gave Swanigan an offer. Caleb Swanigan verbally committed to Michigan State on April 10, 2015, but decommitted on May 7. He said, "I just felt like it was better basketball-wise for me." Similar to his high school decision, Roosevelt Barnes said, "He wants to win a national championship and said he wants to do it in the state of Indiana and wanted to do it at a place he's never done it before." Some people believe Barnes had ulterior motives in adopting Swanigan, to which Barnes said, "Maybe if I wanted to develop the next hot dog-eating champion, the next Joey Chestnut, people would have a legitimate gripe." Swanigan had not consulted Barnes before he committed to Michigan State, and some believe that since Barnes played sports at Purdue he was a major influence in Swanigan decommitting from Michigan State. Barnes said that was not the reason Swanigan switched, and the primary reason for Swanigan choosing Purdue was the presence of two centers that were taller than 7 feet, Isaac Haas and A. J. Hammons, which allowed Swanigan to play the 4 spot.

He decided to stay in-state and chose Purdue on May 19. Swanigan announced his decision by tweeting "#BoilerUp". Swanigan was Purdue's first Indiana's Mr. Basketball recruit since Glenn Robinson in 1991, and was the first McDonald's All-American for Purdue since 1996. Swanigan joined Ryan Cline and Grant Weatherford in Purdue's 2015 recruiting class.

College recruiting
Name	Hometown	School	Height	Weight	Commit date
Caleb Swanigan; C	Fort Wayne, IN	Homestead High School	6 ft 8 in (2.03 m)	275 lb (125 kg)	May 19, 2015
Caleb Swanigan; C	Recruit ratings: Scout: Rivals: 247Sports: (94)				

=== 2015–16 season ===
Swanigan chose to major in general education/educational studies. Swanigan chose the number 50 to honor his father who had died at 50 years old. Swanigan started every game his freshman year. His highest-scoring game was in a win against Wisconsin in Purdue's last regular-season game, where he scored 27 points and missed only one shot from the field. He scored six points and grabbed 10 rebounds in #4 Purdue's loss to #13 Arkansas–Little Rock in the 2016 NCAA Division I men's basketball tournament, and did not play at all during the overtime period.

After his freshman season, Swanigan was one out of 162 underclassmen to enter their names for the 2016 NBA draft. However, despite being one of 63 invitees for the NBA draft combine that year, he ultimately decided to return to college on May 25, which was also the new date set for players to withdraw their names from the draft and try again for another year. An NBA scout said, "I think he has a chance if he can improve his jump shot and help defense. Big-time rebounder, works hard on his own. He's still more undersized center than power forward, though."

Swanigan set several records as a freshman. He was ranked as a top-10 freshman nationally. He set Purdue program records for most rebounds by a freshman (282), games started (34), double-doubles (8) and rebounds per game (8.3). He was also the first major-college player in 25 years that had 600 points, 400 rebounds and 100 assists in a season.

=== 2016–17 season ===
Similar to his freshman year, Swanigan started every game as a sophomore. Swanigan set his personal record for points against Norfolk State with 32, while shooting 83% from the field. Swanigan also managed to grab 20 rebounds, making it one of his four games with at least 20 points and 20 rebounds that year.

As of March 6, 2017, Swanigan was second in the nation in rebounds per game (12.6) and led the nation in double doubles (25) for the 2016–17 season. He was rated first in CBS National Player of the Year voting. In his sophomore season, Swanigan broke several Purdue records, including rebounds in a season, double-doubles in a season, and an NCAA record with four 20–20 performances. Purdue finished as the regular season Big Ten Champions, but were knocked out in the quarterfinals of the Big Ten Tournament by Michigan, the eventual tournament champions.

Purdue entered the 2017 NCAA men's basketball tournament as the 4th seed in the Midwest bracket and played Vermont in the first round. Purdue came away with an 80–70 win for their first tournament win in five years, with Swanigan posting a double-double with 16 points and 14 rebounds. Purdue continued its tournament run against Iowa State in the second round. Swanigan flirted with a triple-double with 20 points, 12 rebounds and 7 assists in Purdue's 80–76 win. In the Sweet Sixteen, Purdue squared off against Kansas. Swanigan was 3-for-4 from the three-point line, finishing with 18 points and seven rebounds. Purdue ended their tournament run in a loss to the Jayhawks, 98–66.

At the conclusion of the season, Swanigan announced he would declare for the NBA draft and not hire an agent, therefore maintaining his college eligibility for at least one more year, if necessary. Swanigan was expected to go in the late first or early second round of the NBA draft. Swanigan finished his academic career with a 3.60 GPA during his last semester, and maintained a cumulative GPA of 3.34.

As a sophomore, Swanigan continued to set records at Purdue. He broke the school single-season record for rebounds, surpassing Joe Barry Carroll's record that was set in 1979 by recording a rebound against Penn State in their February 21, 2017, matchup. Swanigan broke the single-season record for double-doubles at Purdue against #25 Northwestern by recording his 19th double-double. All Big Ten players combined for the last twenty years have two 20–20 games, and Swanigan had four in a single season. On June 22, 2020, the Big Ten Network named Swanigan to the "All-Decade Basketball Team", placing him on their Third Team. Swanigan was one of 16 players honored by the Network for accomplishments between 2010 and 2019.

== Professional career ==
=== Portland Trail Blazers (2017–2019) ===
On June 22, 2017, Swanigan was drafted in the first round (26th overall) by the Portland Trail Blazers. On July 3, 2017, Swanigan signed with the Trail Blazers. On being drafted, Swanigan said: "Being selected tonight in the NBA draft is a dream come true. I have been thinking of this moment for a long time. I know this is only the first step in my professional career, but I am extremely excited for to begin this journey." Boilermakers coach Matt Painter said, "We are thrilled that Biggie has achieved his lifelong dream of being selected in the NBA draft. It's been an incredibly tough road for him to get to this point and no one deserves it more than he does." Swanigan was the first Purdue basketball player to be drafted at the sophomore level or lower. During the 2017 NBA Summer League, Swanigan earned All-Summer League First Team honors for leading the Trail Blazers into the Summer League Finals, despite not winning the final.

Swanigan received his first NBA G League assignment, starting December 22, 2017, with the Canton Charge. On February 4, 2018, Portland recalled Swanigan back to the Trail Blazers. On December 30, he was assigned again to the G League, this time with the Texas Legends.

=== Sacramento Kings (2019–2020) ===
On February 7, 2019, Swanigan was traded to the Sacramento Kings in exchange for Skal Labissière. He was assigned to the G League franchise the Stockton Kings on December 16.

=== Return to the Trail Blazers (2020) ===
On January 20, 2020, Swanigan was traded back to the Portland Trail Blazers along with Trevor Ariza and Wenyen Gabriel in exchange for Kent Bazemore, Anthony Tolliver and two future second-round picks. He opted out of playing with the Trail Blazers in the 2020 NBA Bubble for personal reasons.

== Post-basketball career and death ==
Following his departure from the NBA, Swanigan was charged with misdemeanor drug possession in 2021. A photo went viral around that time which showed he had regained significant weight. The photo and Damian Lillard's defense of Swanigan against online criticism received significant media coverage.

On June 20, 2022, Swanigan died in a Fort Wayne, Indiana hospital at age 25. The Allen County Coroner's Office reported that Swanigan "died of natural causes".

== Career statistics ==
Legend
GP	Games played	GS	Games started	MPG	Minutes per game
FG%	Field goal percentage	3P%	3-point field goal percentage	FT%	Free throw percentage
RPG	Rebounds per game	APG	Assists per game	SPG	Steals per game
BPG	Blocks per game	PPG	Points per game	**Bold**	Career high

=== College ===
Year	Team	GP	GS	MPG	FG%	3P%	FT%	RPG	APG	SPG	BPG	PPG
2015–16	Purdue	34	34	25.7	.461	.292	.713	8.3	1.8	**.4**	.2	10.2
2016–17	Purdue	**35**	**35**	**32.5**	**.527**	**.447**	**.781**	**12.5**	**3.1**	**.4**	**.8**	**18.5**
Career		69	69	29.2	.501	.376	.760	10.4	2.4	.4	.5	14.4

=== NBA ===
==== Regular season ====
Year	Team	GP	GS	MPG	FG%	3P%	FT%	RPG	APG	SPG	BPG	PPG
2017–18	Portland	**27**	**3**	7.0	.400	.125	.667	2.0	.5	.2	.1	2.3
2018–19	Portland	18	0	8.1	.318	**.200**	**.857**	2.9	.4	.2	.0	1.9
2018–19	Sacramento	3	0	11.0	.444	.000	.000	4.0	1.3	**.7**	**.3**	2.7
2019–20	Sacramento	7	0	3.3	.500	—	.500	1.0	.3	.1	**.3**	.7
2019–20	Portland	20	1	**13.3**	**.605**	.000	.605	**4.7**	**1.5**	.1	**.3**	**3.0**
Career		75	4	8.7	.438	.118	.614	2.9	.7	.2	.1	2.4

=== NBA G League ===
==== Regular season ====
Year	Team	GP	GS	MPG	FG%	3P%	FT%	RPG	APG	SPG	BPG	PPG
2017–18	Canton	**14**	**12**	**30.3**	**.500**	**.308**	.673	11.9	**2.6**	**1.1**	.9	14.2
2018–19	Stockton	8	3	29.5	.462	.111	**.714**	**12.9**	2.4	**1.1**	.5	**15.3**
2018–19	Texas	4	3	22.5	**.500**	.286	.667	7.0	1.8	.5	**1.0**	8.5
Career		26	18	28.8	.486	.262	.688	11.4	2.4	1.0	.8	13.7

==== Playoffs ====
Year	Team	GP	GS	MPG	FG%	3P%	FT%	RPG	APG	SPG	BPG	PPG
2019	Stockton	1	1	36.0	.545	–	.667	17.0	5.0	.0	1.0	14.0

== Awards and honors ==
=== High school ===
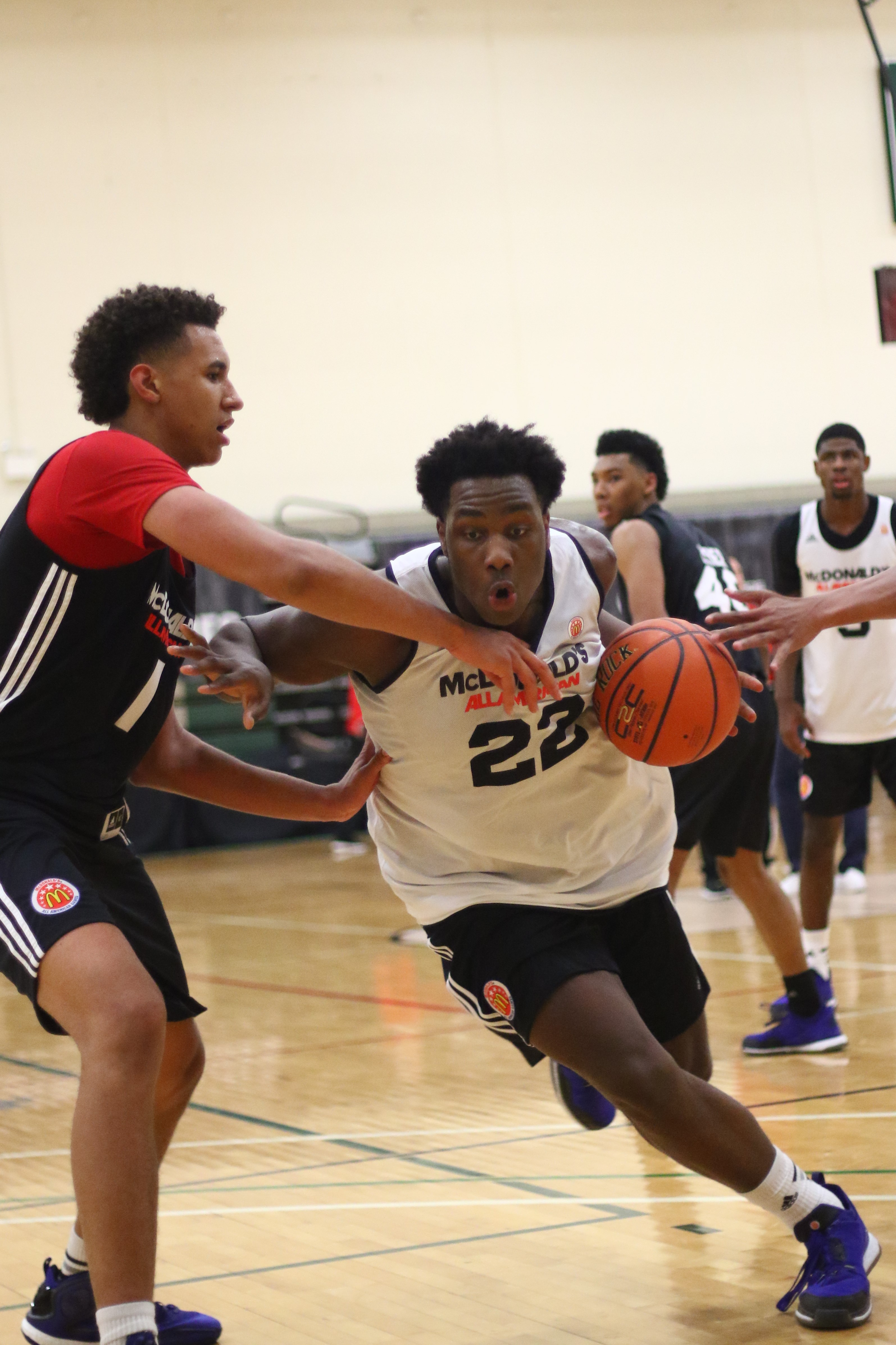
Swanigan driving on Chase Jeter at the 2015 McDonald's All-American Boys Game closed practice

Swanigan was named Indiana's Mr. Basketball and also was selected as a McDonald's All-American. He was selected as the Gatorade Player of the Year and the Indiana Basketball Coaches Association Underclass All-State first team. He was the All-USA Today Indiana Player of the year, and was selected to the Associated Press All-State Third Team.

=== College ===
In his freshman year, Swanigan earned the Big Ten Freshman of the week three times, a school record. He was named to the Big Ten All-Freshman Team. Swanigan was also named the National Freshman of the Week on March 8, 2016.

During his sophomore season, Swanigan was selected to the Preseason All-Big Ten Team. Swanigan received the Big Ten Player of the Week award six times, the second most in a season in conference history. Swanigan also was selected unanimously for the Big Ten Player of the Year in the coaches poll, the fourth in Purdue's history, and the AP Big Ten Player of the Year. He was named the Basketball Times National Player of the Year and to five All-America teams: USBWA, Sporting News, USA Today, Sports Illustrated and NBC Sports. Swanigan was named the Lute Olsen National Player of the Week two times. He was also the Naismith Trophy Player of the Week and Academic All-District. Swanigan was a top-four finalist for the Naismith Award, the player of the year award, joining Lonzo Ball, Frank Mason and Josh Hart. Swanigan was also an Academic All-American for maintaining a 3.3 GPA. Swanigan was a unanimous selection for first-team All-Big Ten in both the coaches and media polls.
