= 2017 NCAA Men's Basketball All-Americans =

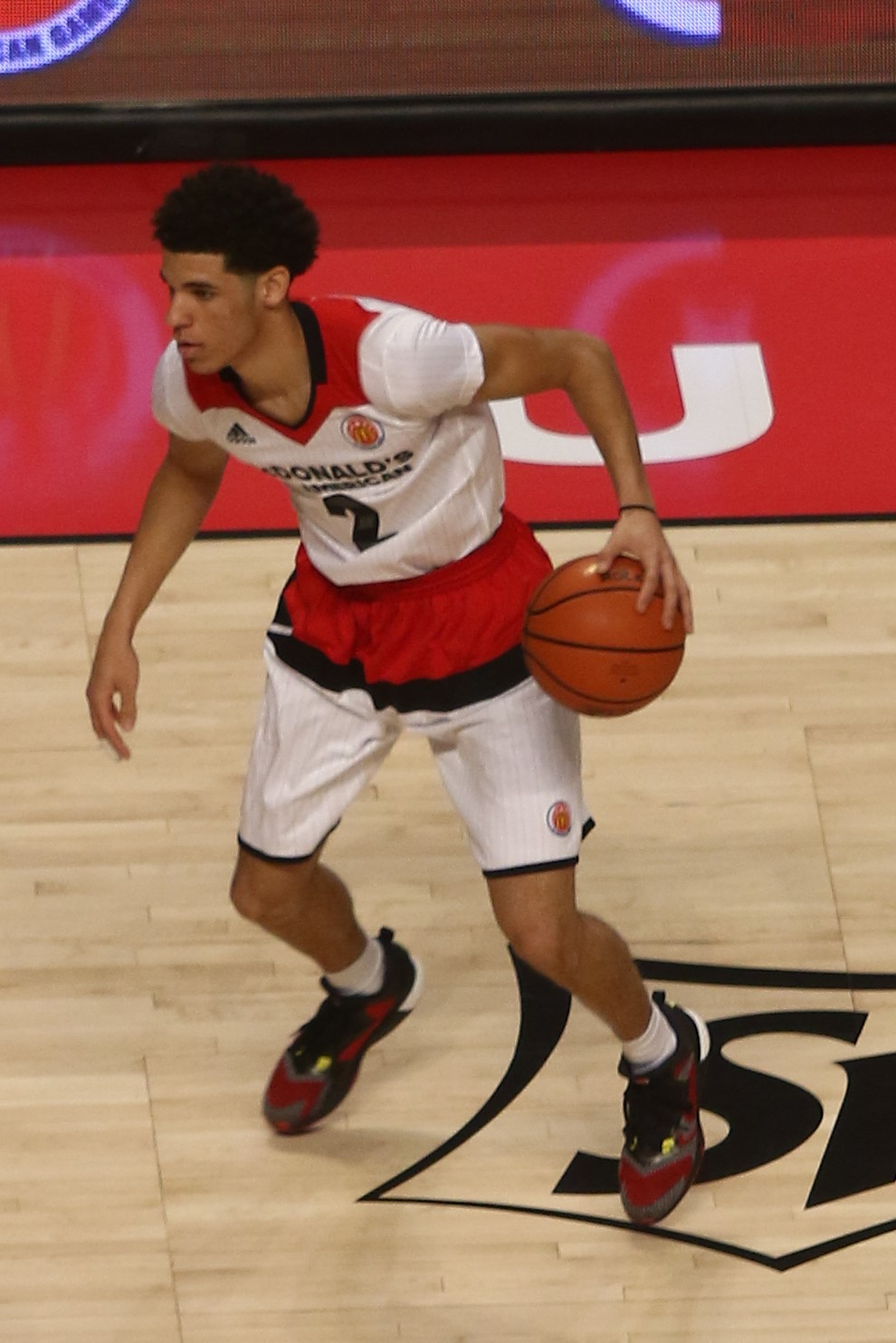
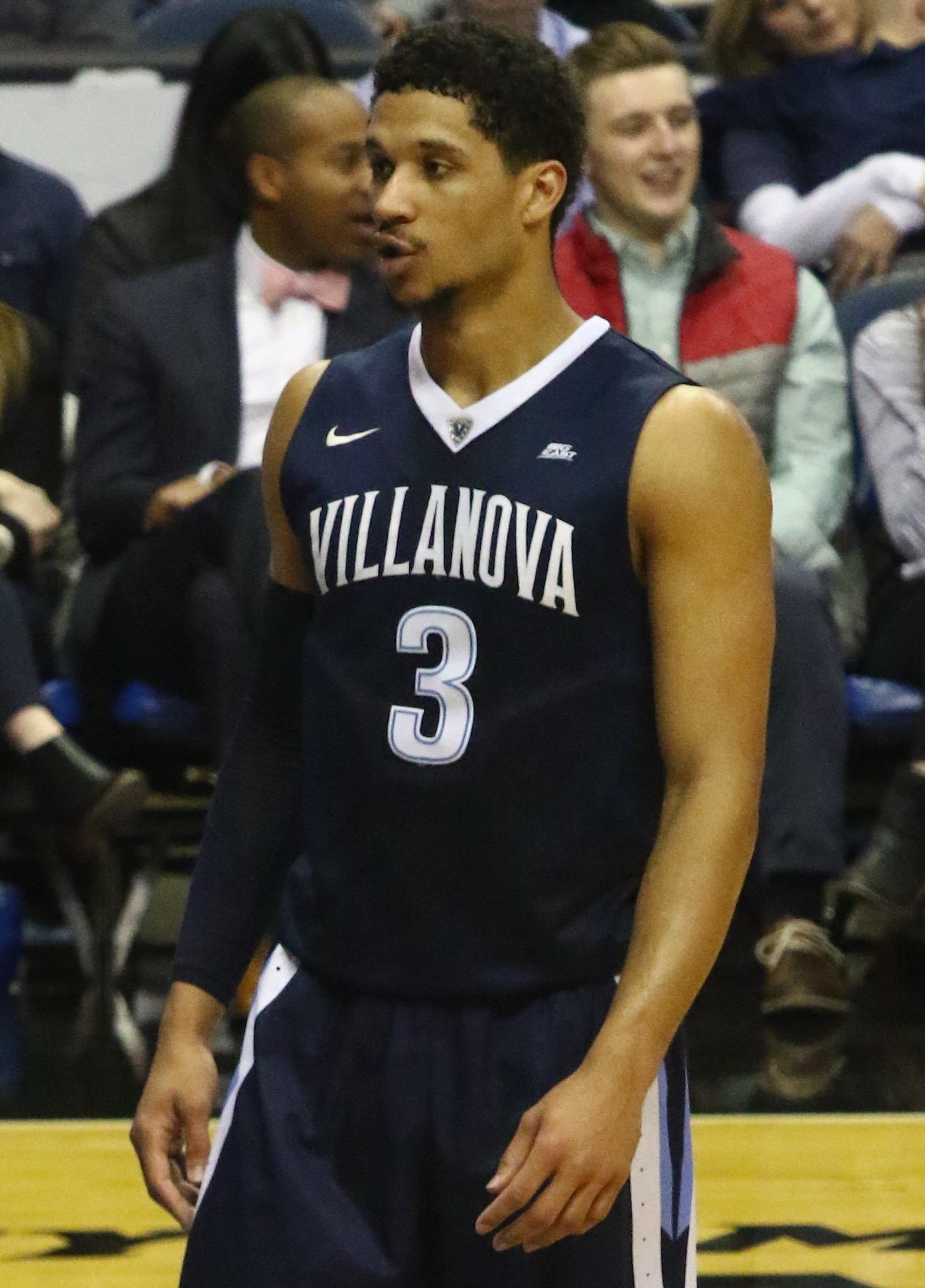
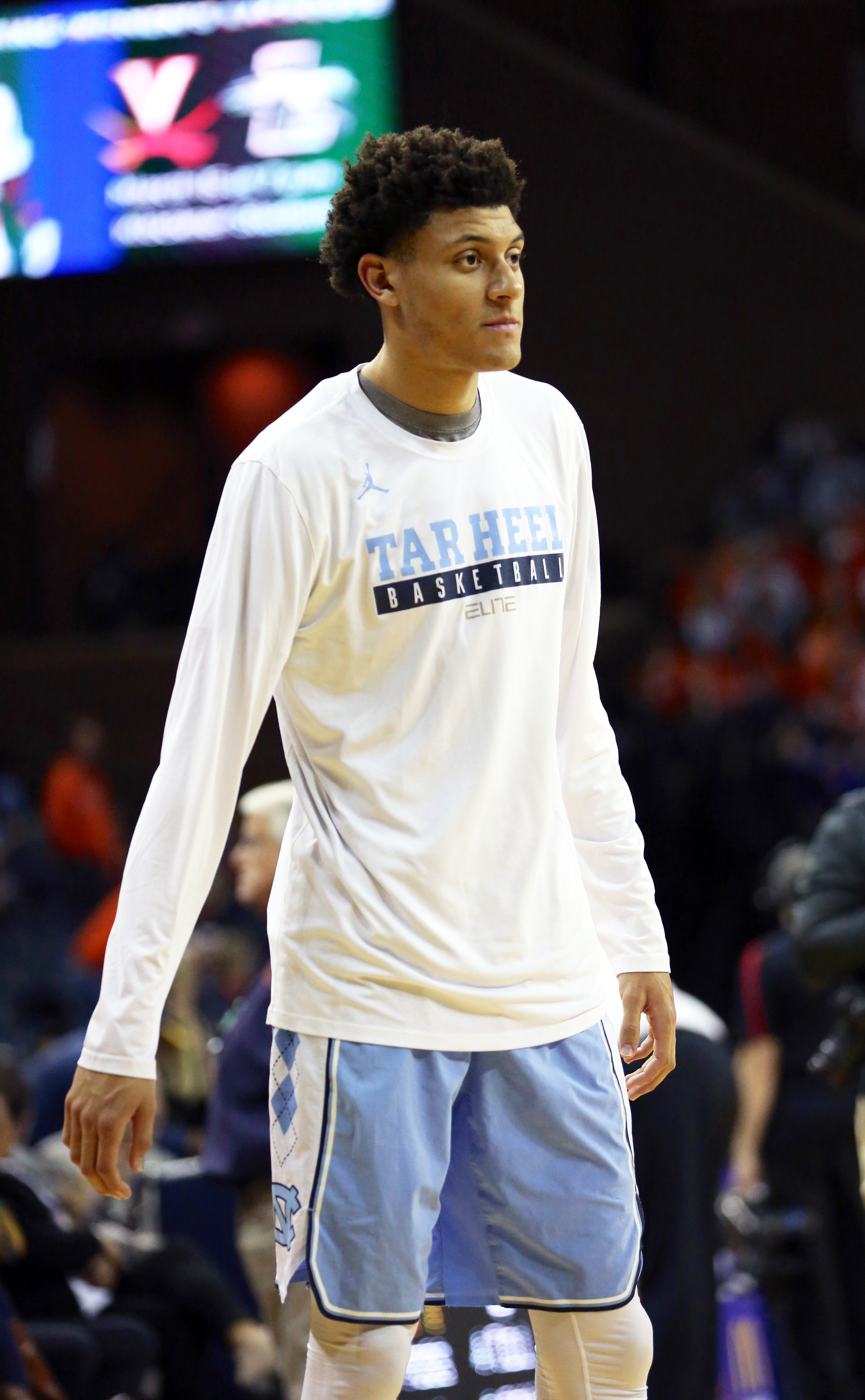
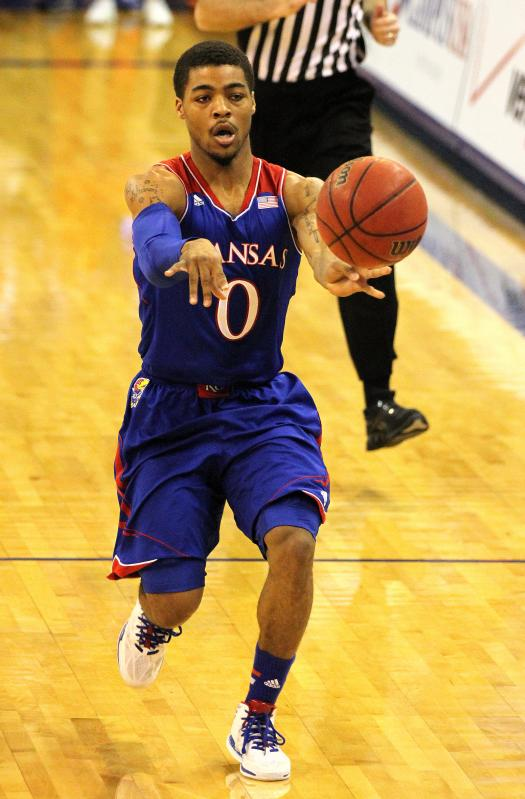
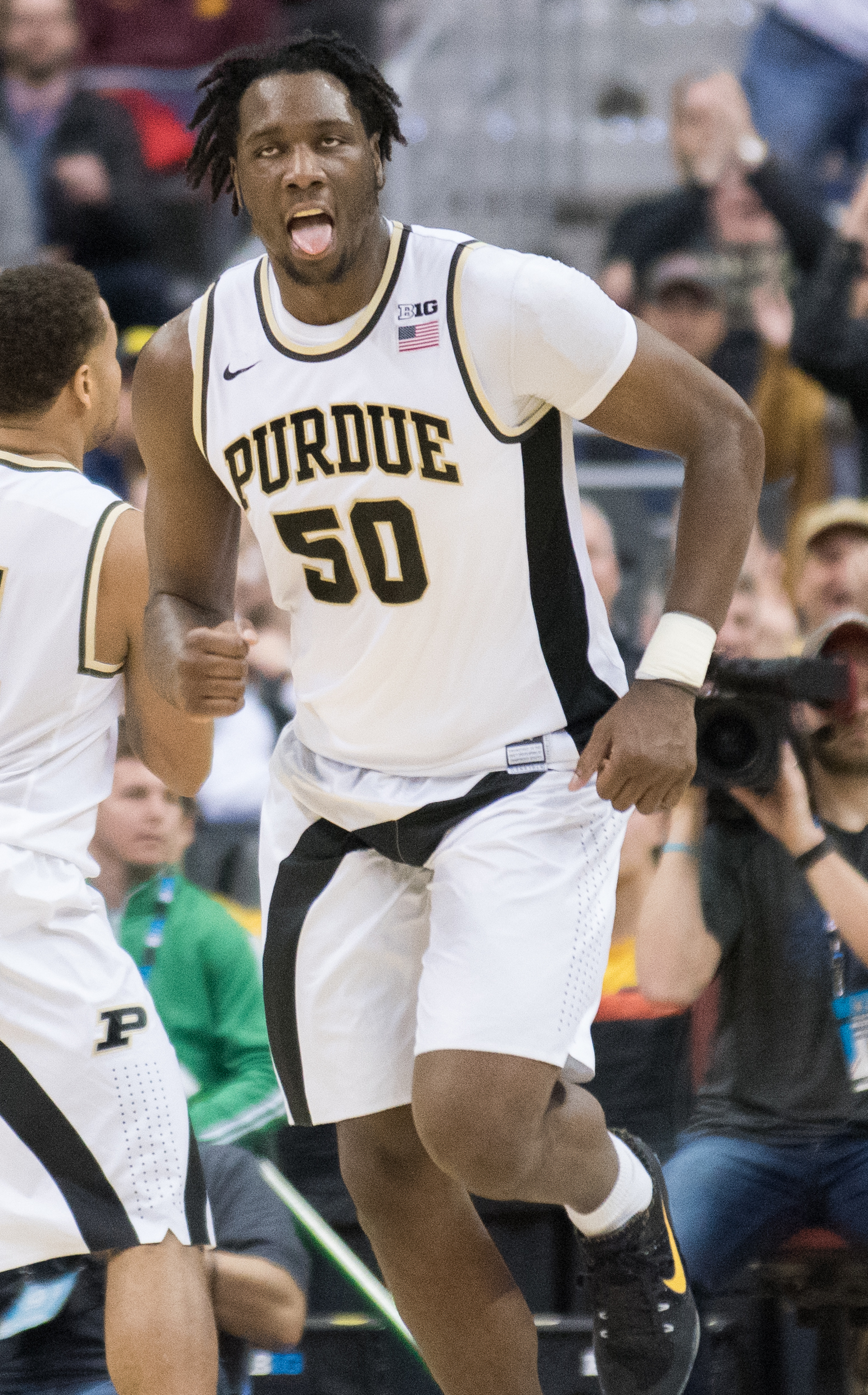
- The 2017 consensus first team. Clockwise from top left: Ball, Hart, Jackson, Swanigan, Mason.
- Awarded for: 2016–17 NCAA Division I men's basketball season

An All-American team is an honorary sports team composed of the best amateur players of a specific season for each team position—who in turn are given the honorific "All-America" and typically referred to as "All-American athletes", or simply "All-Americans". Although the honorees generally do not compete together as a unit, the term is used in U.S. team sports to refer to players who are selected by members of the national media. Walter Camp selected the first All-America team in the early days of American football in 1889. The 2017 NCAA Men's Basketball All-Americans are honorary lists that include All-American selections from the Associated Press (AP), the United States Basketball Writers Association (USBWA), the Sporting News (TSN), and the National Association of Basketball Coaches (NABC) for the 2016–17 NCAA Division I men's basketball season. All selectors choose at least a first and second 5-man team. The NABC, TSN and AP choose third teams, while AP also lists honorable mention selections.

The Consensus 2017 College Basketball All-American team is determined by aggregating the results of the four major All-American teams as determined by the National Collegiate Athletic Association (NCAA). Since United Press International was replaced by TSN in 1997, the four major selectors have been the aforementioned ones. AP has been a selector since 1948, NABC since 1957 and USBWA since 1960. To earn "consensus" status, a player must win honors based on a point system computed from the four different all-America teams. The point system consists of three points for first team, two points for second team and one point for third team. No honorable mention or fourth team or lower are used in the computation. The top five totals plus ties are first team and the next five plus ties are second team.

Although the aforementioned lists are used to determine consensus honors, there are numerous other All-American lists. The ten finalists for the John Wooden Award are described as Wooden All-Americans. The ten finalists for the Senior CLASS Award are described as Senior All-Americans. Other All-American lists include those determined by USA Today, Fox Sports, Yahoo! Sports and many others. The scholar-athletes selected by College Sports Information Directors of America (CoSIDA) are termed Academic All-Americans.

== 2017 Consensus All-America team ==
PG – Point guard
SG – Shooting guard
PF – Power forward
SF – Small forward
C – Center

Consensus First Team
Player	Position	Class	Team
Lonzo Ball	PG	Freshman	UCLA
Josh Hart	SG	Senior	Villanova
Justin Jackson	SF	Junior	North Carolina
Frank Mason III	PG	Senior	Kansas
Caleb Swanigan	PF	Sophomore	Purdue

Consensus Second Team
Player	Position	Class	Team
Dillon Brooks	SF	Junior	Oregon
Luke Kennard	SG	Sophomore	Duke
Malik Monk	SG	Freshman	Kentucky
Johnathan Motley	PF	Junior	Baylor
Nigel Williams-Goss	PG	Junior	Gonzaga

== Individual All-America teams ==
=== By player ===
Player	School	AP	USBWA	NABC	TSN	CP	Notes
Lonzo Ball	UCLA	1	1	1	1	12	USBWA National Freshman of the Year
Josh Hart	Villanova	1	1	1	1	12	Senior CLASS Award, Julius Erving Award
Frank Mason III	Kansas	1	1	1	1	12	John R. Wooden Award, Naismith College Player of the Year, NABC Player of the Year, AP Player of the Year, Oscar Robertson Trophy, Bob Cousy Award
Caleb Swanigan	Purdue	1	1	1	1	12	Pete Newell Big Man Award
Justin Jackson	North Carolina	1	2	1	1	11	
Nigel Williams-Goss	Gonzaga	2	1	2	2	9	
Dillon Brooks	Oregon	2	2	2	2	8	
Luke Kennard	Duke	2	2	2	2	8	
Malik Monk	Kentucky	2	2	2	2	8	Jerry West Award
Johnathan Motley	Baylor	2	2	2	2	8	Karl Malone Award
Josh Jackson	Kansas	3		3	2	4	
Markelle Fultz	Washington	3		3	3	3	
Ethan Happ	Wisconsin	3		3	3	3	
Lauri Markkanen	Arizona	3		3	3	3	
Bonzie Colson	Notre Dame	3			3	2	
Jawun Evans	Oklahoma State				3	1	
Alec Peters	Valparaiso			3		1	

=== By team ===
All-America Team
All-America Team	First team		Second team		Third team	
All-America Team	Player	School	Player	School	Player	School
Associated Press	Lonzo Ball	UCLA	Dillon Brooks	Oregon	Bonzie Colson	Notre Dame
Associated Press	Josh Hart	Villanova	Luke Kennard	Duke	Markelle Fultz	Washington
Associated Press	Justin Jackson	North Carolina	Malik Monk	Kentucky	Ethan Happ	Wisconsin
Associated Press	Frank Mason III	Kansas	Johnathan Motley	Baylor	Josh Jackson	Kansas
Associated Press	Caleb Swanigan	Purdue	Nigel Williams-Goss	Gonzaga	Lauri Markkanen	Arizona
USBWA	Lonzo Ball	UCLA	Dillon Brooks	Oregon	No third team	
USBWA	Josh Hart	Villanova	Justin Jackson	North Carolina	No third team	
USBWA	Frank Mason III	Kansas	Luke Kennard	Duke	No third team	
USBWA	Caleb Swanigan	Purdue	Malik Monk	Kentucky	No third team	
USBWA	Nigel Williams-Goss	Gonzaga	Johnathan Motley	Baylor	No third team	
NABC	Lonzo Ball	UCLA	Dillon Brooks	Oregon	Markelle Fultz	Washington
NABC	Josh Hart	Villanova	Luke Kennard	Duke	Ethan Happ	Wisconsin
NABC	Justin Jackson	North Carolina	Malik Monk	Kentucky	Josh Jackson	Kansas
NABC	Frank Mason III	Kansas	Johnathan Motley	Baylor	Lauri Markkanen	Arizona
NABC	Caleb Swanigan	Purdue	Nigel Williams-Goss	Gonzaga	Alec Peters	Valparaiso
Sporting News	Lonzo Ball	UCLA	Dillon Brooks	Oregon	Bonzie Colson	Notre Dame
Sporting News	Josh Hart	Villanova	Josh Jackson	Kansas	Jawun Evans	Oklahoma State
Sporting News	Justin Jackson	North Carolina	Luke Kennard	Duke	Markelle Fultz	Washington
Sporting News	Frank Mason III	Kansas	Malik Monk	Kentucky	Ethan Happ	Wisconsin
Sporting News	Caleb Swanigan	Purdue	Johnathan Motley	Baylor	Lauri Markkanen	Arizona
Sporting News			Nigel Williams-Goss	Gonzaga		

AP Honorable Mention:

- Ian Baker, New Mexico State
- Trae Bell-Haynes, Vermont
- Evan Bradds, Belmont
- Gian Clavell, Colorado State
- T. J. Cline, Richmond
- Patrick Cole, North Carolina Central
- Mike Daum, South Dakota State
- Angel Delgado, Seton Hall
- Jawun Evans, Oklahoma State
- Nana Foulland, Bucknell
- De'Aaron Fox, Kentucky
- Jerome Frink, LIU Brooklyn
- Kevin Hervey, Texas–Arlington
- Isaiah Johnson, Akron
- Keon Johnson, Winthrop
- Peter Jok, Iowa
- Przemek Karnowski, Gonzaga
- Marcus Keene, Central Michigan
- Jock Landale, Saint Mary's
- T. J. Leaf, UCLA
- Paris Lee, Illinois State
- Zach Lofton, Texas Southern
- Donovan Mitchell, Louisville
- Dallas Moore, North Florida
- Monte Morris, Iowa State
- Luke Nelson, UC Irvine
- Semi Ojeleye, SMU
- Alec Peters, Valparaiso
- Justin Robinson, Monmouth
- Devin Sibley, Furman
- Dennis Smith Jr., NC State
- Erik Thomas, New Orleans
- Sindarius Thornwell, South Carolina
- Melo Trimble, Maryland
- Spencer Weisz, Princeton
- Jacob Wiley, Eastern Washington
- JaCorey Williams, Middle Tennessee
- T. J. Williams, Northeastern

== Academic All-Americans ==
On March 2, 2017, the College Sports Information Directors of America (CoSIDA) announced the 2017 Academic All-America team, with Canyon Barry (youngest son of Hall of Famer Rick Barry) headlining the NCAA Division I team as the men's college basketball Academic All-American of the Year. The following is the 2016–17 Academic All-America Division I Men’s Basketball Team as selected by CoSIDA:

First Team
Player	School	Class	GPA and major
Canyon Barry (Note: First-team selection in 2015–16 and second-team selection in 2014–15, both at Charleston)	Florida	GS	4.00 (U), physics; 4.00 (G), nuclear engineering
Joshua Braun (Note: First-team selection in 2015–16)	Grand Canyon	GS	3.83 (U), business; 4.00 (G), MBA
A. J. Jacobson (Note: Third-team selection in 2015–16)	North Dakota State	Jr.	3.99, zoology (pre-dental)
Alec Peters	Valparaiso	GS	3.43 (U)/3.53 (G), sports administration
Nigel Williams-Goss (Note: Third-team selection in 2014–15 at Washington)	Gonzaga	Jr.	3.84, psychology

Second Team
Player	School	Class	GPA and major
Evan Bradds	Belmont	Sr.	3.49, finance
Luke Kornet	Vanderbilt	Sr.	3.71, engineering, computer science, math
Eric Mika	BYU	So.	3.68, pre-management
Semi Ojeleye	SMU	Jr.	3.65, psychology
Caleb Swanigan	Purdue	So.	3.30, education

Third Team
Player	School	Class	GPA and major
Steven Cook	Princeton	Sr.	3.53. economics
Jordan Howard	Central Arkansas	Jr.	3.80, digital filmmaking
Matt O'Leary	IUPUI	Sr.	3.81, management
Tyler Seibring	Elon	So.	4.00, English, economics
Steven Spieth	Brown	Sr.	3.40, business

== Senior All-Americans ==
The ten finalists for the Senior CLASS Award are called Senior All-Americans. The 10 honorees are as follows, divided into first and second teams with the winner highlighted in bold text:

=== First team ===
Player	Position	School
**Josh Hart**	Guard	Villanova
Josh Hawkinson	Forward	Washington State
Amile Jefferson	Forward	Duke
Przemek Karnowski	Center	Gonzaga
Frank Mason III	Guard	Kansas

=== Second team ===
Player	Position	School
Jaron Blossomgame	Forward	Clemson
Evan Bradds	Forward	Belmont
Nigel Hayes	Forward	Wisconsin
Peter Jok	Guard	Iowa
Tim Kempton Jr.	Center	Lehigh
