= J. J. Mann =

American basketball player (born 1991)

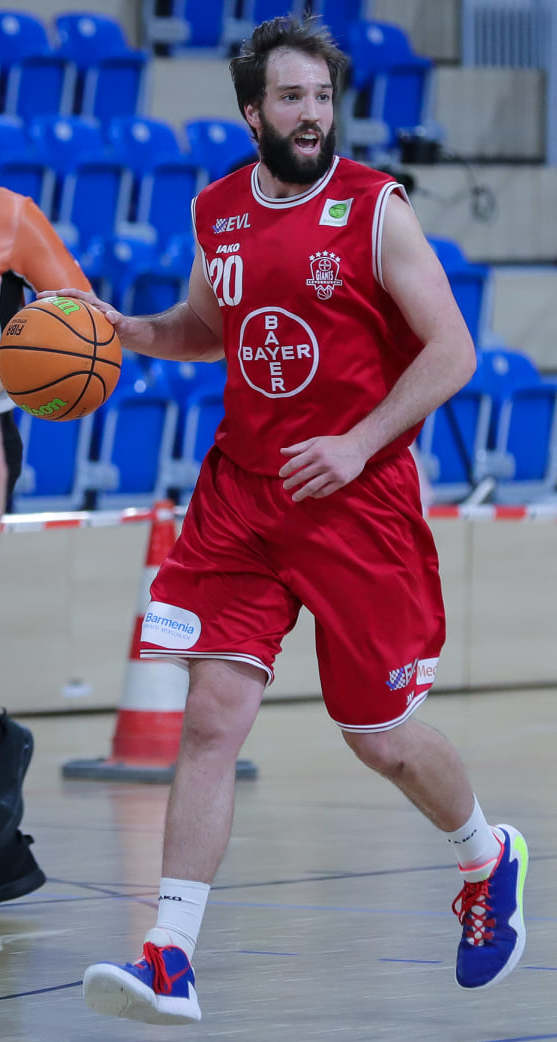

No. 24 – ETB Miners
- Position: Small forward
- League: ProA

Personal information
- Born: June 12, 1991 (age 35) East Point, Georgia, U.S.
- Listed height: 6 ft 6 in (1.98 m)
- Listed weight: 215 lb (98 kg)

Career information
- High school: Marist School (Brookhaven, Georgia); Hargrave Military Academy (Chatham, Virginia)
- College: Belmont (2010–2014)
- NBA draft: 2014: undrafted
- Playing career: 2014–present

Career history
- 2014–2015: Oberwart Gunners
- 2015–2016: Phoenix Hagen
- 2016–2017: Belfius Mons-Hainaut
- 2017–2018: Sigal Prishtina
- 2018–2019: Team FOG Næstved
- 2019–2020: Okapi Aalstar
- 2020–2022: Bayer Giants Leverkusen
- 2022–2023: Phoenix Hagen
- 2023: Soles de Mexicali
- 2023–2026: Gladiators Trier
- 2026–present: ETB Miners

Career highlights
- A-Sun All-Freshmen Team (2011); First-team Academic All-American (2014); OVC Player of the Year (2014); First-team All-OVC (2014); Austrian Basketball Bundesliga All-Star (2015)

John Stuart "J. J." Mann (born June 12, 1991) is an American basketball player for ETB Miners of the German ProA. He played college basketball for Belmont University.

== College career ==
He played college basketball for the Belmont Bruins. As a senior during the 2013–14 season, Mann was named Ohio Valley Conference Player of the Year. He was also a First Team Academic All-American in 2013–14.

== Professional career ==
=== Oberwart Gunners (2014–2015) ===
Mann signed a pro deal to play with King Wilki Morskie Szczecin in Poland on July 24, 2014. However, on August 25 he moved to the Oberwart Gunners in Austria without playing a game in Poland.

=== Phoenix Hagen (2015–2016) ===
Mann joined Phoenix Hagen on August 13, 2015.

=== Okapi Aalstar (2019–2020) ===
On June 12, 2019, Mann signed with Okapi Aalstar of the Belgian Pro Basketball League. and signed one year later with Bayer Giants Leverkusen

=== Bayer Giants Leverkusen (2020–2023) ===
In July 2020, Mann signed with Bayer Giants Leverkusen of the German ProA.

=== Phoenix Hagen (2022–2023) ===
In July 2022, Mann signed with his former club Phoenix Hagen of the German ProA.

=== Soles de Mexicali (2023) ===
In July 2023, Mann signed with Soles de Mexicali in Mexico and appeared in 8 games.

=== Römerstrom Gladiators Trier (2023–2026) ===
In September 2023, Mann returned to Germany and signed with Gladiators Trier of the German ProA.

=== ETB Miners (2026–present) ===
On July 16, 2026, he signed with ETB Miners of the German ProA.

== The Basketball Tournament ==
J.J. Mann played for Team Showtime in the 2018 edition of The Basketball Tournament. In two games, he averaged 4.5 points per game, 2.5 assists per game and 1.5 steals per game. Team Showtime reached the second round before falling to Louisiana United.
