= Greeneview High School =

Public, coeducational high school in Jamestown, Ohio, United States

Location
- 4710 Cottonville Road; Jamestown, (Greene County), Ohio 45335; United States
- Coordinates: 39°39′26″N 83°45′32″W

Information
- Type: Public, coeducational high school
- School district: Greeneview Local School District
- Superintendent: Sabrina Woodruff
- Principal: Neal Kasner
- Faculty: 48
- Grades: 9-12
- Colors: Red, white, and blue
- Athletics: 41 programs
- Athletics conference: Ohio Heritage Conference
- Mascot: Ram
- Team name: Rams
- Rival: Cedarville
- Website: https://hs.greeneview.org/

Greeneview High School is a public high school in Jamestown, Ohio, United States. It is the only high school in the Greeneview Local School District. Their mascot is the Ram.

== Ohio High School Athletic Association State Championships ==
- Boys Soccer – 2005

== Notable alumni ==
- Evan Bradds, college basketball player
- Gary Bradds, Ohio State and pro basketball player, third pick of 1964 NBA draft
- Matt Brown, The Ultimate Fighter 7 competitor; professional mixed martial artist fighting in the UFC
- Roland James, professional football player; played in Super Bowl for New England Patriots
