= 2014 NCAA Men's Basketball All-Americans =

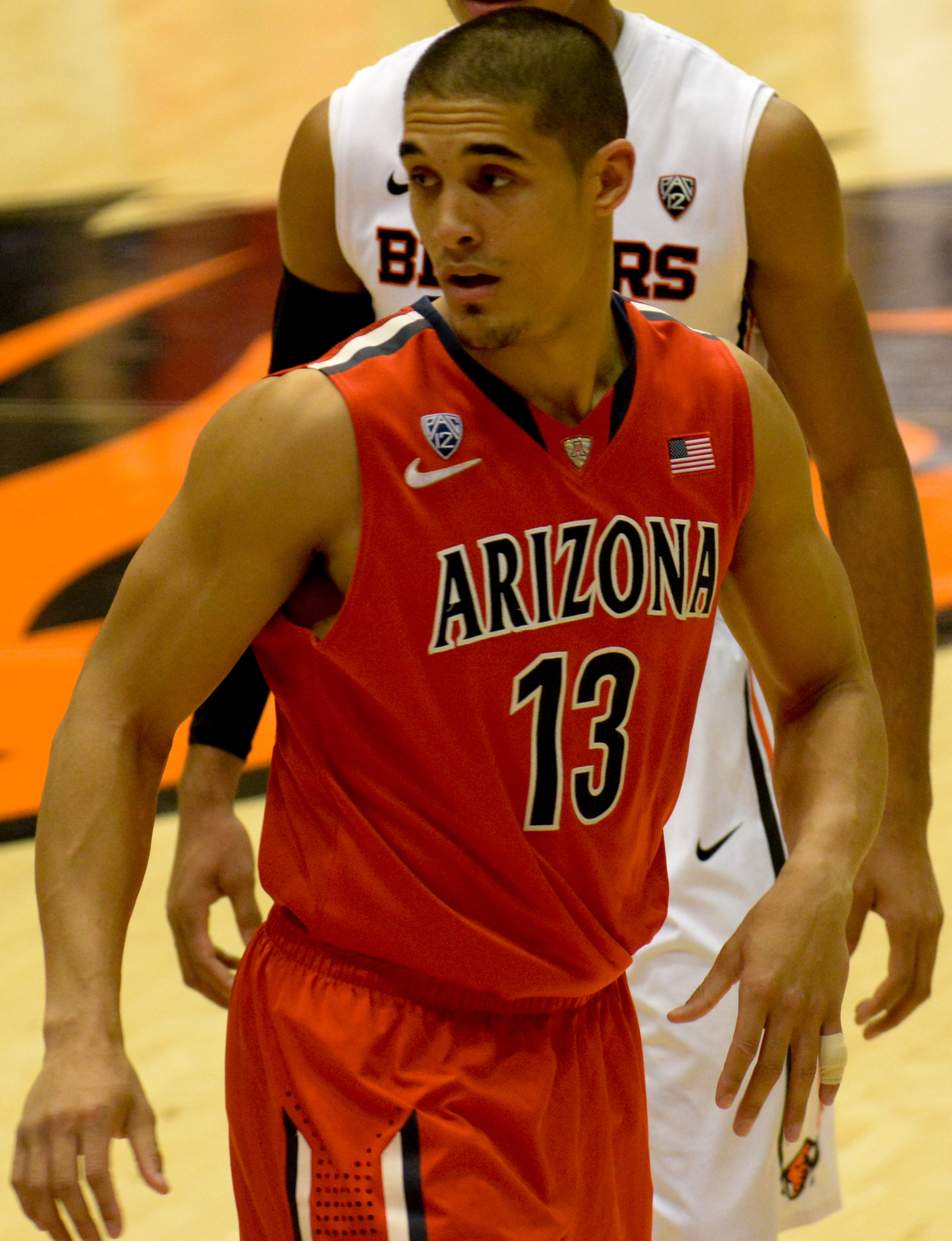
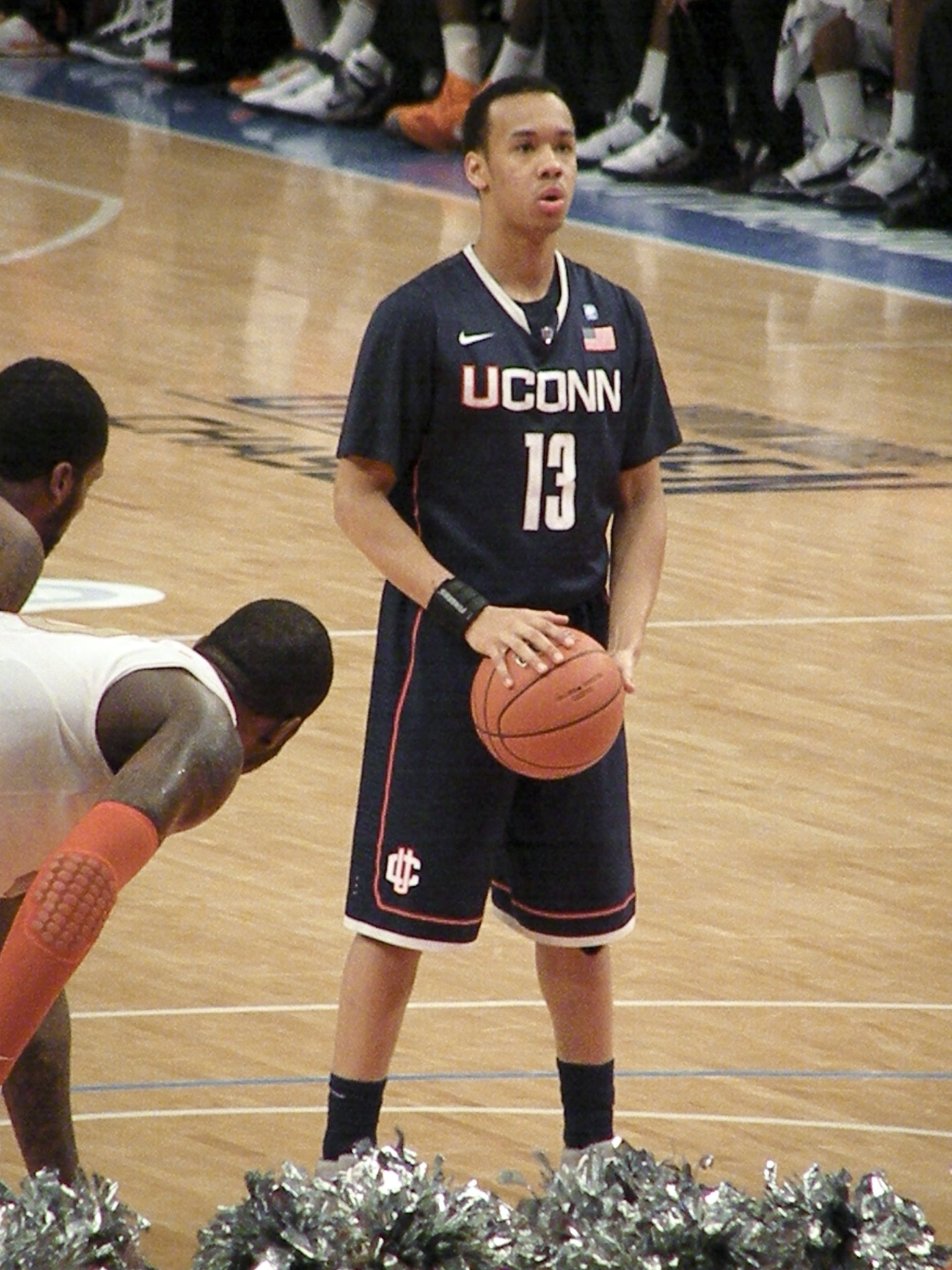
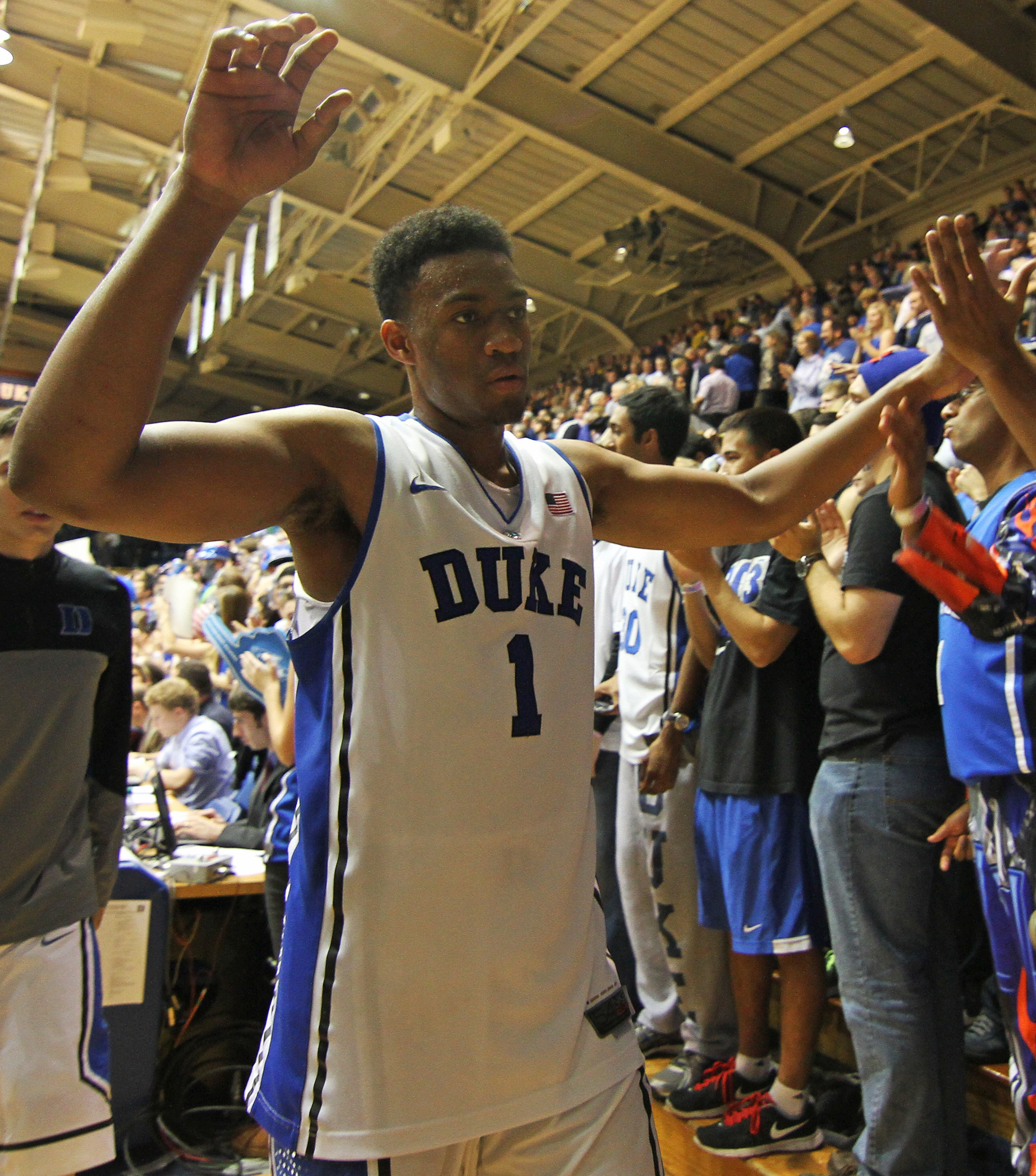
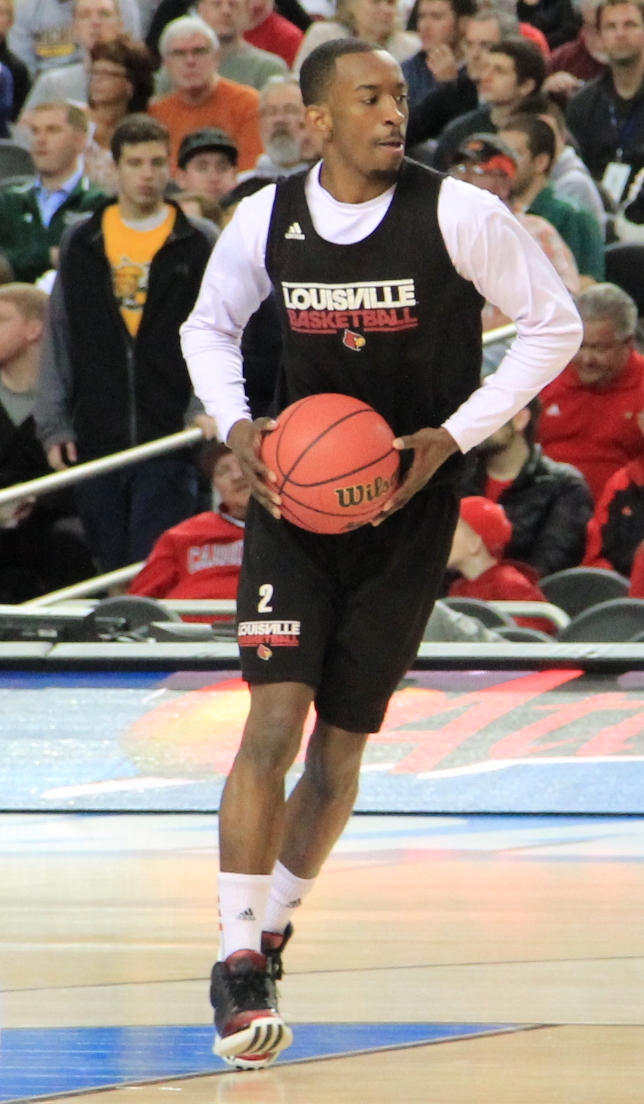
- Members of the 2014 Consensus All-America first team. Clockwise from upper left: Johnson, Napier, Smith and Parker (not pictured: McDermott).
- Awarded for: 2013–14 NCAA Division I men's basketball season

An All-American team is an honorary sports team composed of the best amateur players of a specific season for each team position—who in turn are given the honorific "All-America" and typically referred to as "All-American athletes", or simply "All-Americans". Although the honorees generally do not compete together as a unit, the term is used in U.S. team sports to refer to players who are selected by members of the national media. Walter Camp selected the first All-America team in the early days of American football in 1889. The 2014 NCAA Men's Basketball All-Americans are honorary lists that include All-American selections from the Associated Press (AP), the United States Basketball Writers Association (USBWA), the Sporting News (TSN), and the National Association of Basketball Coaches (NABC) for the 2013–14 NCAA Division I men's basketball season. All selectors choose at least a first and second 5-man team. The NABC, TSN and AP choose third teams, while AP also lists honorable mention selections.

The Consensus 2014 College Basketball All-American team is determined by aggregating the results of the four major All-American teams as determined by the National Collegiate Athletic Association (NCAA). Since United Press International was replaced by TSN in 1997, the four major selectors have been the aforementioned ones. AP has been a selector since 1948, NABC since 1957 and USBWA since 1960. To earn "consensus" status, a player must win honors based on a point system computed from the four different all-America teams. The point system consists of three points for first team, two points for second team and one point for third team. No honorable mention or fourth team or lower are used in the computation. The top five totals plus ties are first team and the next five plus ties are second team.

Although the aforementioned lists are used to determine consensus honors, there are numerous other All-American lists. The ten finalists for the John Wooden Award are described as Wooden All-Americans. The ten finalists for the Senior CLASS Award are described as Senior All-Americans. Other All-American lists include those determined by Fox Sports, and Yahoo! Sports. The scholar-athletes selected by College Sports Information Directors of America (CoSIDA) are termed Academic All-Americans.

== 2014 Consensus All-America team ==
PG – Point guard
SG – Shooting guard
PF – Power forward
SF – Small forward
C – Center

Consensus First Team
Player	Position	Class	Team
Nick Johnson	PG/SG	Junior	Arizona
Doug McDermott	SF	Senior	Creighton
Shabazz Napier	PG	Senior	Connecticut
Jabari Parker	PF	Freshman	Duke
Russ Smith	PG/SG	Senior	Louisville

Consensus Second Team
Player	Position	Class	Team
Cleanthony Early	F	Senior	Wichita State
C. J. Fair	SF	Senior	Syracuse
Sean Kilpatrick	SG	Senior	Cincinnati
Nik Stauskas	SG	Sophomore	Michigan
T. J. Warren	SF	Sophomore	NC State
Andrew Wiggins	SF	Freshman	Kansas

== Individual All-America teams ==
Player	School	AP	USBWA	NABC	TSN	CP	Notes
Doug McDermott	Creighton	1	1	1	1	12	National Player of the Year (Naismith, Wooden, AP, NABC, TSN, USBWA), NCAA scoring leader, Lute Olson Award
Jabari Parker	Duke	1	1	1	1	12	Freshman of the Year (USBWA)
Nick Johnson	Arizona	2	1	1	1	11	
Shabazz Napier	Connecticut	1	1	1	2	11	NCAA Tournament Most Outstanding Player, Bob Cousy Award
Russ Smith	Louisville	1	1	2	1	11	Frances Pomeroy Naismith Award
Sean Kilpatrick	Cincinnati	1	2	2	1	10	
Andrew Wiggins	Kansas	2	2	2	2	8	
Nik Stauskas	Michigan	2		1	2	7	
Cleanthony Early	Wichita State	3	2	2		5	
C. J. Fair	Syracuse	3	2	2		5	
T. J. Warren	NC State	2		3	2	5	
Melvin Ejim	Iowa State	2	2			4	
Scottie Wilbekin	Florida	3		3	3	3	
Kyle Anderson	UCLA	3			3	2	
Marcus Paige	North Carolina				2	2	
Julius Randle	Kentucky	3		3		2	
Fred VanVleet	Wichita State			3	3	2	
Aaron Gordon	Arizona				3	1	
DeAndre Kane	Iowa State				3	1	
Marcus Smart	Oklahoma State			3		1	

=== By team ===
All-America Team
All-America Team	First team		Second team		Third team	
All-America Team	Player	School	Player	School	Player	School
Associated Press	Sean Kilpatrick	Cincinnati	Melvin Ejim	Iowa State	Kyle Anderson	UCLA
Associated Press	Doug McDermott	Creighton	Nick Johnson	Arizona	Cleanthony Early	Wichita State
Associated Press	Shabazz Napier	Connecticut	Nik Stauskas	Michigan	C. J. Fair	Syracuse
Associated Press	Jabari Parker	Duke	T. J. Warren	NC State	Julius Randle	Kentucky
Associated Press	Russ Smith	Louisville	Andrew Wiggins	Kansas	Scottie Wilbekin	Florida
USBWA	Nick Johnson	Arizona	Cleanthony Early	Wichita State	No third team	
USBWA	Doug McDermott	Creighton	Melvin Ejim	Iowa State	No third team	
USBWA	Shabazz Napier	Connecticut	C. J. Fair	Syracuse	No third team	
USBWA	Jabari Parker	Duke	Sean Kilpatrick	Cincinnati	No third team	
USBWA	Russ Smith	Louisville	Andrew Wiggins	Kansas	No third team	
NABC	Nick Johnson	Arizona	Cleanthony Early	Wichita State	Julius Randle	Kentucky
NABC	Doug McDermott	Creighton	C. J. Fair	Syracuse	Marcus Smart	Oklahoma State
NABC	Shabazz Napier	Connecticut	Sean Kilpatrick	Cincinnati	Fred VanVleet	Wichita State
NABC	Jabari Parker	Duke	Russ Smith	Louisville	T. J. Warren	NC State
NABC	Nik Stauskas	Michigan	Andrew Wiggins	Kansas	Scottie Wilbekin	Florida
Sporting News	Nick Johnson	Arizona	Shabazz Napier	Connecticut	Kyle Anderson	UCLA
Sporting News	Sean Kilpatrick	Cincinnati	Marcus Paige	North Carolina	Aaron Gordon	Arizona
Sporting News	Doug McDermott	Creighton	Nik Stauskas	Michigan	DeAndre Kane	Iowa State
Sporting News	Jabari Parker	Duke	T. J. Warren	NC State	Fred VanVleet	Wichita State
Sporting News	Russ Smith	Louisville	Andrew Wiggins	Kansas	Scottie Wilbekin	Florida

AP Honorable Mention:

- Karvel Anderson, Robert Morris
- Cameron Ayers, Bucknell
- Cameron Bairstow, New Mexico
- Billy Baron, Canisius
- Jerrelle Benimon, Towson
- Davion Berry, Weber State
- Taylor Braun, North Dakota State
- De'Mon Brooks, Davidson
- John Brown, High Point
- Bryce Cotton, Providence
- Joel Embiid, Kansas
- Tyler Ennis, Syracuse
- Aaron Gordon, Arizona
- Langston Hall, Mercer
- Gary Harris, Michigan State
- Tyler Haws, BYU
- R. J. Hunter, Georgia State
- Jordair Jett, Saint Louis
- Shawn Jones, Middle Tennessee
- DeAndre Kane, Iowa State
- J. J. Mann, Belmont
- Javon McCrea, Buffalo
- Daniel Mullings, New Mexico State
- Aaric Murray, Texas Southern
- Marcus Paige, North Carolina
- Jacob Parker, Stephen F. Austin
- Lamar Patterson, Pittsburgh
- Adreian Payne, Michigan State
- Casey Prather, Florida
- Wesley Saunders, Harvard
- Marcus Smart, Oklahoma State
- Juwan Staten, West Virginia
- Keifer Sykes, Green Bay
- Xavier Thames, San Diego State
- Fred VanVleet, Wichita State
- Jameel Warney, Stony Brook
- Alan Williams, UC Santa Barbara
- Pendarvis Williams, Norfolk State
- Patric Young, Florida

== Academic All-Americans ==
On February 20, 2014, CoSIDA and Capital One announced the 2014 Academic All-America team, with Aaron Craft headlining the University Division as the men's college basketball Academic All-American of the Year. The following is the 2013–14 Capital One Academic All-America Men's Basketball Team (University Division) as selected by CoSIDA:

First Team
Player	School	Class	GPA and major
Aaron Craft	Ohio State	Senior	3.93 Nutrition/Pre-Med
Brayden Carlson	South Dakota State	Senior	3.94 Economics
Drew Crawford	Northwestern	Graduate student	3.31 Sports administration
Melvin Ejim	Iowa State	Senior	3.70 History
J. J. Mann	Belmont	Senior	3.51 Economics

Second Team
Player	School	Class	GPA and major
Jordan Dykstra	South Dakota State	Senior	3.71 Biology, Pre-dentistry
Holton Hunsaker	Utah Valley	Senior	3.88 Accounting
Dennis Ogbe	Tennessee Tech	Senior	3.91 Electrical Engineering
Marcus Paige	North Carolina	Sophomore	3.39 Journalism & Mass Comm.
Kendrick Perry	Youngstown State	Senior	3.46 Criminal Justice

Third Team
Player	School	Class	GPA and major
Malte Kramer	Pepperdine	Senior	4.00 Economics
Beau Levesque	Saint Mary's	Graduate student	3.80 Master of Arts in Leadership
Matt Townsend	Yale	Junior	4.00 Molecular & Cellular Bio.
Thomas van der Mars	Portland	Junior	3.95 Operations & Tech. Mgmt.
Patric Young	Florida	Senior	3.37 Telecommunications

== Senior All-Americans ==
The ten finalists for the Senior CLASS Award are called Senior All-Americans. The 10 honorees are as follows:

Player	School
Aaron Craft	Ohio State
Jordan Dykstra	South Dakota State
Melvin Ejim	Iowa State
Dwayne Evans	Saint Louis
C. J. Fair	Syracuse
Tim Frazier	Penn State
Doug McDermott	Creighton
Shabazz Napier	Connecticut
Russ Smith	Louisville
Patric Young	Florida
