= Tyler Lundblade =

American basketball player (born 2001)

No. 7 – Tennessee Volunteers
- Position: Shooting guard
- League: Southeastern Conference

Personal information
- Born: December 6, 2001 (age 24) Dallas, Texas, U.S.
- Listed height: 6 ft 5 in (1.96 m)
- Listed weight: 195 lb (88 kg)

Career information
- High school: Grapevine Faith Christian School (Grapevine, Texas); Greensboro Day School (Greensboro, North Carolina)
- College: TCU (2022–2024); Belmont (2024–2026); Tennessee (2026–present)

Career highlights
- MVC Player of the Year (2026); First-team All-MVC (2026)

Tyler Andrew Lundblade (born December 6, 2001) is an American college basketball player for the Tennessee Volunteers of the Southeastern Conference. He previously played for the TCU Horned Frogs and the Belmont Bruins.

== High school career ==
Lundblade's father Kirk played basketball at SMU while his brother Brad played football professionally. The younger Lundblade began his high school career at Grapevine Faith Christian School. He averaged 28.1 points, 8.2 rebounds and 2.9 assists per game as a senior, and was the TAPPS District 1-5A MVP and a 5A All-State recognition. Lundblade did a prep year at Greensboro Day School. He was named to the all-conference team after helping the team to a 24–6 record. Lundblade was a McDonald's All-American nominee and a three-star recruit according to 247Sports and ESPN. He received scholarship offers from Charlotte and FIU, but accepted a preferred walk-on role at SMU for coach Tim Jankovich.

== College career ==
Lundblade walked on to the basketball team at SMU and redshirted his freshman season. He transferred to TCU as a walk-on before earning a scholarship and then losing it due to a hernia injury. Lundblade transferred again to Belmont.

He averaged 12.4 points and 2.0 rebounds per game as a junior and shot an NCAA Division 1-leading 48.1 percent from three-point range. As a senior, Lundblade averaged 15.6 points, 2.7 rebounds and 1.8 assists per game while shooting 40.6 percent from three-point range. Lundblade was named Missouri Valley Conference Player of the Year. He led the Bruins to a 26–6 record and the No. 1 seed in the Missouri Valley Conference. Following the season Lundblade transferred to Tennessee.
