= Evan Bradds =

American basketball coach (born 1994)

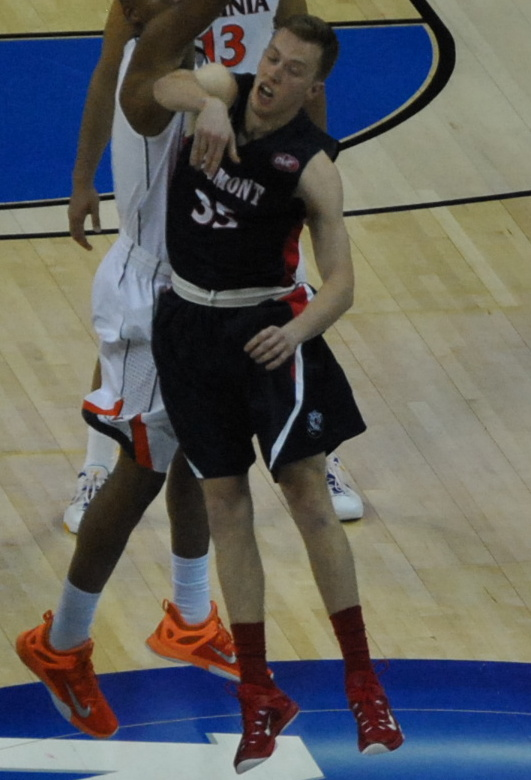
- Bradds playing for Belmont in 2015

Belmont Bruins
- Position: Head coach
- League: Missouri Valley Conference

Personal information
- Born: April 17, 1994 (age 32) Jamestown, Ohio, U.S.
- Listed height: 6 ft 7 in (2.01 m)
- Listed weight: 205 lb (93 kg)

Career information
- High school: Greeneview (Jamestown, Ohio)
- College: Belmont (2013–2017)
- NBA draft: 2017: undrafted
- Coaching career: 2017–present

Career history

Coaching
- 2017–2018: Maine Red Claws / Celtics (assistant)
- 2018–2022: Boston Celtics (assistant)
- 2022–2025: Utah Jazz (assistant)
- 2025–2026: Duke (assistant)
- 2026–present: Belmont

Career highlights
- 2× AP Honorable Mention All-American (2016, 2017); 2× OVC Player of the Year (2016, 2017); 2× First-team All-OVC (2016, 2017); Second-team All-OVC (2015); Third-team Academic All-American (2016)

Evan Christopher Bradds (born April 17, 1994) is an American basketball coach who is currently the head coach for the Belmont Bruins of the Missouri Valley Conference (MVC). He also played basketball at Belmont.

== Playing career ==
Bradds grew up in Jamestown, Ohio and starred at Greeneview High School. He chose to play college basketball at Belmont University, and was a regular rotation player as a freshman, earning Ohio Valley Conference (OVC) Freshman of the Week honors on four occasions. As a sophomore, Bradds entered the starting lineup for the Bruins, averaging 14.2 points and 7.2 rebounds per game and leading the nation in field goal percentage (.688). As a junior, Bradds was named the OVC Player of the Year. Bradds was also recognized as a third-team Academic All-American in 2016.

== Coaching career ==
On November 3, 2017, Bradds joined the coaching staff of the Maine Red Claws.

In September 2021, Bradds was promoted to assistant coach/player enhancement staff after spending two seasons as video assistant with the Boston Celtics.

On July 14, 2022, Bradds was hired by Will Hardy, the new head coach of the Utah Jazz. Bradds became the assistant coach for player development.

On May 1, 2025, Bradds was hired as an assistant coach for the Duke Blue Devils men's basketball team.

On March 19, 2026, Bradds was hired as the head coach for the Belmont Bruins men's basketball team.

== Head coaching record ==
Record table
Season	Team	Overall	Conference	Standing	Postseason
Belmont Bruins (Missouri Valley Conference) (2026–present)
2026–27	Belmont	2–0	0–0		
Belmont:		2–0 (1.000)	0–0 (–)		
Total:		2–0 (1.000)			
National champion Postseason invitational champion Conference regular season champion Conference regular season and conference tournament champion Division regular season champion Division regular season and conference tournament champion Conference tournament champion

== Personal life ==
Bradds' grandfather was former Ohio State All-American and NBA player Gary Bradds.
