= Adam Sonn =

American basketball player (born 1980)

Personal information
- Born: February 8, 1980 (age 46) Nashville, Tennessee, U.S.
- Listed height: 6 ft 8 in (2.03 m)
- Listed weight: 230 lb (104 kg)

Career information
- High school: Donelson Christian Academy (Nashville, Tennessee)
- College: Lipscomb (1998–1999); Belmont (2000–2003)
- NBA draft: 2003: undrafted
- Position: Power forward / center
- Coaching career: 2008–2023

Career history

Playing
- 2004: Orléans
- 2004–2005: Nashville Rhythm
- 2005–2006: Polynorm Giants
- 2006–2007: Luleå

Coaching
- 2008–2012: Nashville Christian School
- 2012–2023: Goodpasture Christian School

Career highlights
- Atlantic Sun Player of the Year (2003); 2× First-team All-Atlantic Sun (2002, 2003); Tennessee Mr. Basketball (1998)

Adam Sonn (born February 8, 1980) is an American former professional basketball player and coach. He played college basketball for the Lipscomb Bisons and Belmont Bruins. Sonn was selected as the Atlantic Sun Player of the Year with the Bruins in 2003. He played professionally in Belgium, France, South Korea, the Netherlands, Sweden and Spain. Sonn became a high school basketball coach after his retirement from playing.

== Early life ==
Sonn was raised in Nashville, Tennessee, and attended Donelson Christian Academy. He was selected as Class A Tennessee Mr. Basketball by the Tennessee Secondary School Athletic Association in 1998.

Sonn committed to play for the Lipscomb Bisons because his family had connections to Lipscomb University through their Churches of Christ affiliation. His mother and two of his aunts attended the university and his uncle, Steve Flatt, served as its president.

== College career ==
Sonn played one season for the Bisons under head coach Don Meyer. In 1999, Flatt decided to move the Lipscomb athletic programs from the National Association of Intercollegiate Athletics (NAIA) to the National Collegiate Athletic Association (NCAA) Division I. Meyer left Lipscomb in protest and Sonn decided to transfer. He chose to join the Belmont Bruins over the Tennessee Tech Golden Eagles.

With the Bruins, Sonn was a two-time All-Atlantic Sun first-team selection and named as the Atlantic Sun Player of the Year in 2003. He scored a total of 1,241 points and is among the Bruins' all-time leading rebounders. Sonn set a Bruins record for most rebounds in a Division I game when he grabbed 21 on January 17, 2002.

Sonn was inducted into the Belmont University Athletics Hall of Fame in 2015.

== Professional career ==
Sonn played professionally in Belgium, France, South Korea, the Netherlands, Sweden and Spain.

Sonn played for the Nashville Rhythm of the American Basketball Association (ABA) during the 2004–05 season. He publicly advocated for his coach, Ashley McElhiney, to keep her job after she was fired during a game.

== Post-playing career ==
Sonn coached at Nashville Christian School from 2008 to 2012.

In 2012, Sonn was appointed as head coach of the boys' varsity basketball team at Goodpasture Christian School in Madison, Tennessee. He led the team to seven Division II-A state tournament appearances and won the Division II-AA state title in 2021.

On May 17, 2023, Goodpasture Christian School announced that Sonn was leaving his coaching position to become the school's director of advancement.

== Personal life ==
Sonn's younger brother, Jason, also played basketball for the Belmont Bruins.
