= Larry Striplin =

American basketball and baseball coach

Biographical details
- Born: November 11, 1929; Selma, Alabama, U.S.
- Died: January 23, 2012 (aged 82); Birmingham, Alabama, U.S.
- Education: Spring Hill College (1950); Birmingham–Southern College (1951); Peabody College (1952)

Coaching career (HC unless noted)

Basketball
- 1952–1956: Belmont

Baseball
- 1954–1955: Belmont

Administrative career (AD unless noted)
- 1952–1956: Belmont

Head coaching record
- Overall: 24–17 (basketball) ?–? (baseball)

Larry D. Striplin, Jr. (November 11, 1929 – January 23, 2012) was an American college basketball and baseball coach. He was also an influential figure in the state of Alabama's sports, having served on numerous boards for halls of fame.

Born in Selma, Alabama, Striplin attended Albert G. Parish High School before enrolling at Spring Hill College. After two years, Striplin transferred to Birmingham–Southern College where he excelled on the school's swimming, basketball, and baseball teams. He graduated in 1951, then pursued his Master's in Education at Peabody College (part of Vanderbilt University) in Nashville, Tennessee. Upon graduation, Striplin established the men's basketball program at Belmont State College (now Belmont University) and served as their first head coach. At the same time, he assumed the role of Belmont's athletic director, the first in their history, and Striplin started the baseball program. Like basketball, he served as the first head coach, covering for the 1954 and 1955 seasons. His influence on the athletics program was great, and has been referred to as the "patriarch" of the whole program. Striplin left Belmont, and education altogether, in 1956 to pursue business in Jackson, Tennessee. Eventually, Striplin owned his own glass company and did well for himself. In 1975, Striplin joined the Alabama Sports Hall of Fame and spent 23 years on the board, 13 of them as chairman. He continued to push for sports history and preservation in Alabama throughout his life. He has been inducted into the State of Alabama Academy of Honor in 1997, was the 1998 Alabama Sports Hall of Fame's Distinguished Sportsman of the Year, and was later inducted himself in 2007. Belmont's Striplin Gym is named in his honor. Larry D. Striplin married His college sweetheart, Beverly Ponder Striplin. They had four children, Larry III, Janet, David, and Cynthia.

== Head coaching record ==
=== Basketball ===
Record table
Season	Team	Overall	Conference	Standing	Postseason
Belmont Bruins (Volunteer State Athletic Conference) (1952–1956)
1952–53	Belmont	7–10			
1953–54	Belmont	17–13			
1954–55	Belmont	7–11			
1955–56	Belmont	16–8			
Belmont:		47–42			
Total:		47–42 (.528)			

=== Baseball ===
Record table
Season	Team	Overall	Conference	Standing	Postseason
Belmont Bruins (Volunteer State Athletic Conference) (1954–1955)
1954	Belmont	3–8			
1955	Belmont	?–?			
Belmont:		?–?			
Total:		?–?			
