= Belmont Bruins men's basketball =

College basketball team

2026–27 Belmont Bruins men's basketball team
- University: Belmont University
- Head coach: Evan Bradds (1st season)
- Location: Nashville, Tennessee
- Arena: Curb Event Center (capacity: 5,085)
- Conference: Missouri Valley Conference
- Nickname: Rebels (1953-1995); Bruins (1995-present)
- Colors: Navy, white, and red

NCAA Division I tournament appearances
- 2006, 2007, 2008, 2011, 2012, 2013, 2015, 2019

NAIA semifinals
- 1995, 1996
Other NAIA tournament results
Quarterfinals	1994, 1995, 1996
Appearances	1989, 1993, 1994, 1995, 1996

Conference tournament champions
- 2006, 2007, 2008, 2011, 2012, 2013, 2015, 2020

Conference regular-season champions
- ASUN: 2006, 2008, 2010, 2011, 2012 OVC: 2013, 2014, 2016, 2017, 2019, 2020, 2021 MVC: 2026

Conference division champions
- 2003, 2013, 2014, 2015, 2016, 2017

Uniforms
Home	Away

The Belmont Bruins men's basketball team represents Belmont University in Nashville, Tennessee. Belmont completed a 10-season run in the Ohio Valley Conference in 2021–22, and joined the Missouri Valley Conference in July 2022. The Bruins play their home games at the Curb Event Center under head coach Evan Bradds. Their most recent NCAA Division I tournament appearance was in 2019.

== Coaching staff ==
- Evan Bradds – Head coach
- Brian Ayers – Associate head coach
- Brendan Mullins – Associate head coach
- Marcus Belcher – Assistant coach
- Ja'Darius Harris – Assistant coach
- Clay Holmes – Director of Basketball Operations
- Ryley McClaran – Graduate Assistant

== Rivalries ==
=== Lipscomb University (Battle of the Boulevard) ===
The Battle of the Boulevard, also referred to as the Belmont–Lipscomb basketball rivalry is a college basketball rivalry between the Belmont University Bruins and the Lipscomb University Bisons. Its nickname was established because of both school's close placement in Nashville, Tennessee– about three miles apart on the same road.

=== Murray State University ===
Recently, the Bruins have been building a rivalry with Murray State University since the Bruins' entry into the OVC in 2012. From that year until both teams' departure from the OVC in 2022, Belmont and Murray State combined to win every regular season championship, including two seasons (2018-19 & 2019-20) where they shared the title. In three consecutive years (from 2018 to 2020), the Racers and Bruins met in the OVC Tournament finals, with Belmont winning the 2020 meeting. With Belmont joining the MVC alongside Murray State, the rivalry will continue in that conference. The Bruins currently lead the all-time series 17 to 12.

== Awards ==
All-Americans

- Robert Barnes – 1956*
- Adam Sonn – 2003*
- Alex Renfroe – 2009*
- Ian Clark – 2013*
- J.J. Mann – 2014*
- Evan Bradds – 2016*, 2017*

(*) Denotes Honorable Mention

Academic All-Americans

- Wes Burtner – 2001***, 2002*
- Adam Mark – 2002**, 2003*, 2004*
- Justin Hare – 2007**, 2008*
- Andy Wicke – 2009***
- Scott Saunders – 2011***, 2012*
- J.J. Mann – 2014*
- Craig Bradshaw – 2015***, 2016**
- Evan Bradds – 2016***, 2017**
- Dylan Windler – 2018**, 2019**
- Luke Smith – 2021***, 2022***
- Tyler Lundblade – 2026**

(*) Denotes 1st team
(**) Denotes 2nd team
(***) Denotes 3rd team

NACDA Scholar-Athlete of the Year

- Adam Mark – 2004
- Justin Hare – 2008
- Mick Hedgepeth – 2011
- Craig Bradshaw – 2015
- Tyler Lundblade – 2026

Hugh Durham National Coach of the Year Award

- Rick Byrd – 2011

NCAA Bob Frederick Sportsmanship Award

- Rick Byrd – 2012

Missouri Valley Conference Player of the Year

- Tyler Lundblade – 2026

Missouri Valley Conference Coach of the Year

- Casey Alexander – 2026

Ohio Valley/ASUN Conference Player of the Year

- Adam Sonn – 2003
- Alex Renfroe – 2009
- Ian Clark – 2013
- J.J. Mann – 2014
- Evan Bradds – 2016, 2017

OVC/ASUN Defensive Player of the Year

- Ian Clark – 2012, 2013
- Grayson Murphy – 2020, 2021

OVC/ASUN Coach of the Year

- Rick Byrd – 2008, 2011, 2013, 2014, 2017, 2019

NAIA National Coach of the Year

- Rick Byrd – 1995

NAIA National Player of the Year

- Joe Behling – 1989

NAIA All-Americans

- Joe Behling – 1988*, 1989*, 1990*
- Kerry West – 1995*
- Al Allen – 1995**
- DaQuinn Goff – 1996*

(*) Denotes 1st team
(**) Denotes 2nd team

== Record by year ==
Record table
Season	Coach	Overall	Conference	Standing	Postseason
Belmont Rebels (VSAC) (1953–1986)
1953–56	Larry Striplin	58–42 (.580)			1955 NAIA Playoff
1957–62	George Kelley	58–71 (.450)			1960 NAIA District 24 Tournament
1962–64	Ken Sidwell	14–23 (.378)			
1964–66	Wayne Dobbs	35–19 (.648)	4–4		
1966–67	Jack Young	9–16 (.360)	3–5		
1967–72	Dewey Jones	69–76 (.476)	17–25		
1972–74	Ken Sidwell	22–30 (.423)	5–12		
1974–78	Dick Campbell	48–68 (.414)	14–28		
1978–86	Don Purdy	116–138 (.457)	54–62		1982 & '83 NAIA District 24 Tournaments
First 8 Coaches:		429–483 (.478)	97–136		
Belmont Rebels/Bruins (Tennessee Collegiate Athletic Conference)(NAIA) (1986–1996)
1986–87	Rick Byrd	15–15	7–9		
1987–88	Rick Byrd	22–9	15–1		NAIA District 24 Playoff
1988–89	Rick Byrd	25–10	12–4		NAIA National Championships 1st Round
1989–90	Rick Byrd	27–7	14–2		NAIA District 24 Playoffs
1990–91	Rick Byrd	23–9	11–5		NAIA District 24 Playoffs
1991–92	Rick Byrd	22–10	12–4		NAIA District 24 Playoffs
1992–93	Rick Byrd	30–6	12–4		NAIA Sweet Sixteen
1993–94	Rick Byrd	30–7	14–2	1st	NAIA Quarterfinals
1994–95	Rick Byrd	37–2	18–0	1st	NAIA Semifinals
1995–96	Rick Byrd	29–11	13–5		NAIA Semifinals
Belmont Bruins (NCAA Independent) (1996–2001)
1996–97	Rick Byrd	15–11			
1997–98	Rick Byrd	9–18			
1998–99	Rick Byrd	14–13			
1999–2000	Rick Byrd	7–21			
2000–01	Rick Byrd	13–15			
Belmont Bruins (Atlantic Sun Conference) (2001–2012)
2001–02	Rick Byrd	11–17	8–12	T–7th	
2002–03	Rick Byrd	17–12	12–4	1st (North)	
2003–04	Rick Byrd	21–9	15–5	3rd	NIT Opening Round
2004–05	Rick Byrd	14–16	12–8	3rd	
2005–06	Rick Byrd	20–11	15–5	T–1st	NCAA round of 64
2006–07	Rick Byrd	23–10	14–4	2nd	NCAA round of 64
2007–08	Rick Byrd	25–9	14–2	1st	NCAA round of 64
2008–09	Rick Byrd	20–13	14–6	T–2nd	CIT Quarterfinals
2009–10	Rick Byrd	19–12	14–6	T–1st	
2010–11	Rick Byrd	30–5	19–1	1st	NCAA round of 64
2011–12	Rick Byrd	27–8	16–2	1st	NCAA round of 64
Belmont Bruins (Ohio Valley Conference) (2012–2019)
2012–13	Rick Byrd	26–7	14–2	1st (East)	NCAA round of 64
2013–14	Rick Byrd	26–10	14–2	1st (East)	NIT Quarterfinals
2014–15	Rick Byrd	22–11	11–5	T–1st (East)	NCAA round of 64
2015–16	Rick Byrd	20–12	12–4	1st (East)	NIT First Round
2016–17	Rick Byrd	23–7	15–1	1st (East)	NIT Second Round
2017–18	Rick Byrd	24–9	15–3	2nd	
2018–19	Rick Byrd	27–6	16–2	T–1st	NCAA round of 64
Rick Byrd:		713–346 (.673)	378–110 (.790)		
Belmont Bruins (Ohio Valley Conference) (2019–2022)
2019–20	Casey Alexander	26–7	15–3	T–1st	Postseason not held (qualified prior to cancelation)
2020–21	Casey Alexander	26–4	18–2	1st	
2021–22	Casey Alexander	25–8	15–3	2nd	NIT First Round
Belmont Bruins (Missouri Valley Conference) (2022–present)
2022–23	Casey Alexander	21–11	14–6	T–3rd	
2023–24	Casey Alexander	20–13	12–8	T–4th	
2024–25	Casey Alexander	22–11	13–7	4th	
2025–26	Casey Alexander	26–6	16–4	1st	
Casey Alexander:		166–59 (.738)	103–38 (.730)		
Total:		1315–891 (.596)			
National champion Postseason invitational champion Conference regular season champion Conference regular season and conference tournament champion Division regular season champion Division regular season and conference tournament champion Conference tournament champion

== Postseason results ==
They have appeared in eight NCAA Tournaments. Their combined record is 1–8. They qualified for the 2020 NCAA Tournament before it was canceled amid the COVID-19 pandemic. They have appeared in the National Invitation Tournament (NIT) four times with a combined record of 3–4. They have appeared in the CollegeInsider.com Postseason Tournament (CIT) once with a record of 1–1. Prior to joining NCAA Division I, they participated in five NAIA Division I Tournaments. Their combined record is 9–5.

=== NCAA Tournament Results ===
Year	Seed	Round	Opponent	Result
2006	15	First Round	UCLA	L 44–78
2007	15	First Round	(2) Georgetown	L 55–80
2008	15	First Round	(2) Duke	L 70–71
2011	13	First Round	(4) Wisconsin	L 58–72
2012	14	First Round	(3) Georgetown	L 59–74
2013	11	First Round	(6) Arizona	L 64–81
2015	15	First Round	(2) Virginia	L 67–79
2019	11	First Four; First Round	(11) Temple (6) Maryland	W 81–70; L 77–79
2020	n/a	n/a	n/a	n/a

In the 2008 tournament, the #15 seeded Bruins, playing in the West Region, played an exciting, hard-fought first-round game with a perennial powerhouse, the #2 seeded Duke Blue Devils. The Bruins came up one point short of the upset, losing the game 70–71 after Justin Hare's desperation three point attempt barely went wide left of the net. The Bruins rallied from 9 point and 7 point deficits in the second half to take a 70–69 lead late in the game, before Duke scored what proved to be the game's final basket with under a minute left to play.

In 2011 Belmont University won the Atlantic Sun Regular Season Championship and the Atlantic Sun Conference Tournament. The Bruins finished 30–4 overall (marking their first 30 win season in the NCAA era) and 19–1 in conference play. By doing this they received their highest seed in their history, a #13. They faced the perennial powerhouse the #4 seed Wisconsin Badgers in the second round of the Southeast Region, where they lost 58–72.

=== NIT results ===
Year	Round	Opponent	Result
2004	First Round	Austin Peay	L 59–65
2014	First Round; Second Round; Quarterfinals	Green Bay; Robert Morris; Clemson	W 80–65; W 82–71; L 68–73
2016	First Round	Georgia	L 84–93
2017	First Round; Second Round	Georgia; Georgia Tech	W 78–69; L 57–71
2022	First Round	Vanderbilt	L 71-82

=== CIT Results ===
Year	Round	Opponent	Result
2009	First Round; Quarterfinals	Evansville; Old Dominion	W 92–76; L 62–70

=== NAIA Division I Tournament ===
Year	Round	Opponent	Result
1989	First Round	Hastings	L 76–89
1993	First Round; Second Round	Findlay; Minnesota Morris	W 87–73; L 59–66
1994	First Round; Second Round; Quarterfinals	Hawaii–Hilo; Pfeiffer; Oklahoma Baptist	W 91–83; W 99–80; L 76–89
1995	First Round; Second Round; Quarterfinals; Semifinals	Spring Arbor; Geneva; The Master’s; Birmingham–Southern	W 94–75; W 85–65; W 91–72; L 80–90
1996	First Round; Second Round; Quarterfinals; Semifinals	Westminster (PA); Life; Cumberland (KY); Oklahoma City	W 57–54; W 74–73; W 65–60; L 77–80

== Bruins in professional leagues ==
=== Current ===
- Alex Renfroe, CB Miraflores (Spain)
- Ian Clark, Xinjiang Flying Tigers (China)
- J.J. Mann, Okapi Aalst (Belgium)
- Austin Luke, Yoast United (Netherlands)
- Dylan Windler, Perth Wildcats
- Kevin McClain, Baskets Oldenburg (Germany)
- Ben Sheppard, Indiana Pacers

== Record book ==
=== Retired numbers ===
Belmont Bruins Retired Jerseys
No.	Player	Pos.	Career	Ref.
15	Robert Barnes	C	1953–56	
54	Joe Behling	SG	1986–90	
21	Ian Clark	G	2010–13	
