= 2026–27 Missouri Valley Conference men's basketball season =

- League: NCAA Division I
- Sport: Basketball
- Teams: 11
- TV partner(s): ESPN, CBSSN, Gray Media

Regular Season

MVC tournament

MVC men's basketball seasons
- ← 2025–26 2027–28 →

2026–27 Missouri Valley Conference men's basketball standings
	Conf.				Overall
Team	W		L	PCT	W		L	PCT
Murray State	0	–	0	–	4	–	0	1.000
Drake	0	–	0	–	3	–	0	1.000
Belmont	0	–	0	–	3	–	1	.750
UIC	0	–	0	–	3	–	1	.750
Southern Illinois	0	–	0	–	2	–	1	.667
Valparaiso	0	–	0	–	2	–	1	.667
Bradley	0	–	0	–	3	–	2	.600
Evansville	0	–	0	–	2	–	2	.500
Indiana State	0	–	0	–	2	–	2	.500
Northern Iowa	0	–	0	–	2	–	3	.400
Illinois State	0	–	0	–	1	–	3	.250
† 2027 MVC tournament winner As of November 17, 2026; Rankings from AP poll

The 2026–27 Missouri Valley Conference men's basketball season will begin with practices in October 2026, followed by the start of the 2026–27 NCAA Division I men's basketball season in November. Conference play is scheduled to begin in December 2026 and end in March of 2027. Northern Iowa is the defending conference champion, having made the NCAA tournament in 2026 after winning the MVC tournament title.

== Head coaches ==
=== Coaches ===
Team	Head coach	Previous job	Year at school	Overall record	MVC record	MVC championships	NCAA Tournaments
Belmont	Evan Bradds	Duke (asst.)	1	0–0	0–0	0	0
Bradley	Brian Wardle	Green Bay	12	207–160	113–93	2	1 (Note: Bradley won the 2020 MVC tournament and clinched an automatic bid to the NCAA Division I men's basketball tournament, but it was subsequently cancelled due to the Covid-19 pandemic.)
Drake	Eric Henderson	South Dakota State	2	14–20	6–14	0	0
Evansville	David Ragland	Butler (asst.)	5	40–91	18–62	0	0
Illinois State	Ryan Pedon	Ohio State (asst.)	5	71–65	37–43	0	0
Indiana State	Matthew Graves	Indiana State (asso. HC)	3	25–39	12–28	0	0
Murray State	Ryan Miller	Creighton (asst.)	2	20–13	12–8	0	0
Northern Iowa	Kyle Green	Iowa State (asst.)	1	0–0	0–0	0	0
Southern Illinois	Scott Nagy	Wright State	3	30–35	18–22	0	0
UIC	Rob Ehsan	Stanford (asst.)	3	36–30	22–18	0	0
Valparaiso	Roger Powell Jr.	Gonzaga (asst.)	4	40–59	20–40	0	0

Notes:

- All records, appearances, titles, etc. are from time with current school only.
- Year at school includes the 2026–27 season.
- Overall and MVC records are from time at current school and are through the end of the 2025–26 season.

== Preseason ==
=== Preseason polls ===
Rank	Team	Votes
1.	Murray State	(32) 517
2.	Illinois State	(7) 471
3.	UIC	(6) 466
4.	Belmont	(1) 353
5.	Valparaiso	(1) 343
6.	Bradley	(1) 313
(first-place votes)

=== Preseason Missouri Valley Honors ===
Players to Watch List	Team
Jack Smiley	Belmont
Eoin Dillon	Belmont
Timoty van der Knaap	Bradley
Xander Alarie	Bradley
Trevon Payton	Bradley
Owen Larson	Drake
Jon Carroll	Drake
Eli Shetlar	Drake
AJ Casey	Evansville
Bryce Quinet	Evansville
Johnny Kinziger	Illinois State
Chase Walker	Illinois State
Malik Messina-Moore	Illinois State
Noah Cleveland	Illinois State
Jackson Cooper	Indiana State
Karmani Gregory	Indiana State
Greyson Uelman	Northern Iowa
Tate McCubbin	Northern Iowa
Isaiah Johnson-Arigu	Northern Iowa
Ian Smikle	Northern Iowa
Roman Doman	Murray State
Brigham Rogers	Murray State
Mark Padjen	Murray State
Mathis Courbon	Murray State
Jalen Haynes	Southern Illinois
Donovan Hill	Southern Illinois
Ahmad Henderson II	UI Chicago
Andy Johnson	UI Chicago
Mekhi Lowery	UI Chicago
Rashund Washington Jr.	UI Chicago
JT Pettigrew	Valparaiso
Rakim Chaney	Valparaiso
Justus McNair	Valparaiso
Carter Hopoi	Valparaiso

== Regular season ==
=== Early season tournaments ===
The following table summarizes the multiple-team events (MTE) or early-season tournaments in which teams from the Missouri Valley Conference will participate.

Team	Tournament	Dates	Result

† Denotes Neutral Site

== MVC records vs other conferences ==
The MVC has a record of 0–0 in non-conference play during the regular season.
The MVC has a record of 0–0 during tournament play.

Regular season

Power conferences
Conference	Record
ACC	0–0
Big East	0–0
Big Ten	0–0
Big 12	0–0
SEC	0–0
Combined	0–0

Other conferences
Conference	Record
American	0–0
American East	0–0
ASUN	0–0
Atlantic 10	0–0
Big Sky	0–0
Big South	0–0
Big West	0–0
CAA	0–0
C-USA	0–0
Horizon	0–0
Independents	0–0
Ivy League	0–0
MAAC	0–0
MAC	0–0
MEAC	0–0
Mountain West	0–0
NEC	0–0
Ohio Valley	0–0
Patriot League	0–0
Southern	0–0
Southland	0–0
SWAC	0–0
Summit	0–0
Sun Belt	0–0
WCC	0–0
WAC	0–0
Non-Division I	0–0
Combined	0–0

Thru May 4, 2026

Postseason

Power Conferences
Conference	Record
ACC	0–0
Big East	0–0
Big Ten	0–0
Big 12	0–0
SEC	0–0
Combined	0–0

Other conferences
Conference	Record
American	0–0
American East	0–0
ASUN	0–0
Atlantic 10	0–0
Big Sky	0–0
Big South	0–0
Big West	0–0
CAA	0–0
C-USA	0–0
Horizon	0–0
Independents	0–0
Ivy League	0–0
MAAC	0–0
MAC	0–0
MEAC	0–0
Mountain West	0–0
NEC	0–0
Ohio Valley	0–0
Patriot League	0–0
Southern	0–0
Southland	0–0
SWAC	0–0
Summit	0–0
Sun Belt	0–0
WCC	0–0
WAC	0–0
Combined	0–0

Thru May 2026

=== Record against ranked opponents ===
This is a list of games against ranked opponents only (rankings from the AP Poll at time of the game):

Date	Visitor	Home	Site	Significance	Score	Conference record

† Denotes Neutral Site
Thru May 4, 2026

=== Conference matrix ===
This table summarizes the head-to-head results between teams in conference play.

	Belmont	Bradley	Drake	Evansville	Illinois State	Indiana State	Murray State	Northern Iowa	Southern Illinois	UIC	Valpo
vs BU	–	0-0	0-0	0-0	0-0	0-0	0-0	0-0	0-0	0-0	0-0
vs BR	0-0	–	0-0	0-0	0-0	0-0	0-0	0-0	0-0	0-0	0-0
vs DU	0-0	0-0	–	0-0	0-0	0-0	0-0	0-0	0-0	0-0	0-0
vs UE	0-0	0-0	0-0	–	0-0	0-0	0-0	0-0	0-0	0-0	0-0
vs IlSU	0-0	0-0	0-0	0-0	–	0-0	0-0	0-0	0-0	0-0	0-0
vs InSU	0-0	0-0	0-0	0-0	0-0	–	0-0	0-0	0-0	0-0	0-0
vs MrSU	0-0	0-0	0-0	0-0	0-0	0-0	–	0-0	0-0	0-0	0-0
vs UNI	0-0	0-0	0-0	0-0	0-0	0-0	0-0	–	0-0	0-0	0-0
vs SIU	0-0	0-0	0-0	0-0	0-0	0-0	0-0	0-0	–	0-0	0-0
vs UIC	0-0	0-0	0-0	0-0	0-0	0-0	0-0	0-0	0-0	–	0-0
vs VU	0-0	0-0	0-0	0-0	0-0	0-0	0-0	0-0	0-0	0-0	–
Total	0-0	0-0	0-0	0-0	0-0	0-0	0-0	0-0	0-0	0-0	0-0

=== Player of the week ===
Periodically, throughout the season, the Missouri Valley Conference named a player of the week, a newcomer of the week, and a freshman of the week.

Date	Player of the week	Newcomer of the week	Freshman of the week

== Honors and awards ==
=== All-Conference awards and teams ===
Honor	Recipient
Larry Bird Player of the Year	
Coach of the Year	
Defensive MVP	
Sixth Man of the Year	
Newcomer of the Year	
Freshman of the Year	
First Team
Second Team
Third Team	

== Postseason ==
=== MVC Tournament ===
2027 Missouri Valley Conference men's basketball tournament

=== NCAA Tournament ===
The winner of the MVC tournament will receive the conference's automatic bid to the NCAA Tournament.

Seed	Region	School	Round of 64	Round of 32	Sweet Sixteen	Elite Eight	Final Four	Championship
		W–L (%):	0–0 (–)	0–0 (–)	0–0 (–)	0–0 (–)	0–0 (–)	0–0 (–)
Total: 0–0 (–)

=== National Invitation Tournament ===
Seed	Bracket	School	1st round	2nd round	Quarterfinals	Semifinals	Championship
