= 2025–26 Missouri Valley Conference men's basketball season =

- League: NCAA Division I
- Sport: Basketball
- Teams: 11
- TV partner(s): ESPN, CBSSN, Gray Media

Regular Season
- Regular season champions: Belmont (1st title)
- Season MVP: Tyler Lundblade

MVC tournament
- Champions: Northern Iowa (7th title)
- Runners-up: UIC
- Finals MVP: Trey Campbell (UNI)

MVC men's basketball seasons
- ← 2024–25 2026-27 →

2025–26 Missouri Valley Conference men's basketball standings
	Conf.				Overall
Team	W		L	PCT	W		L	PCT
Belmont	16	–	4	.800	26	–	6	.813
Bradley	13	–	7	.650	21	–	13	.618
Illinois State	12	–	8	.600	23	–	13	.639
Murray State	12	–	8	.600	20	–	13	.606
UIC	12	–	8	.600	19	–	16	.543
Northern Iowa †	11	–	9	.550	23	–	13	.639
Valparaiso	11	–	9	.550	18	–	15	.545
Southern Illinois	10	–	10	.500	16	–	16	.500
Drake	6	–	14	.300	14	–	20	.412
Indiana State	4	–	16	.200	11	–	21	.344
Evansville	3	–	17	.150	7	–	25	.219
† 2026 MVC tournament winner

The 2025–26 Missouri Valley Conference men's basketball season began with practices in October 2025, followed by the start of the 2025–26 NCAA Division I men's basketball season in November. Conference play began in December 2025 and end in March of 2026. Drake was the defending conference champion, having made the NCAA tournament in 2025 after winning both the MVC regular season and tournament titles.

With the departure of Missouri State to Conference USA, the conference comprises eleven teams. It is the lowest total of teams since the 2021-22 season, when there were only ten teams in the conference prior to the addition of Belmont and Murray State from the OVC, and UIC from the Horizon League.

== Head coaches ==
=== Coaches ===
Team	Head coach	Previous job	Year at school	Overall record	MVC record	MVC championships	NCAA Tournaments
Belmont	Casey Alexander	Lipscomb	7	140-54	39-21	0	0
Bradley	Brian Wardle	Green Bay	11	181-145	97-85	2	1
Drake	Eric Henderson	South Dakota State	1	0-0	0-0	0	0
Evansville	David Ragland	Butler (asst.)	4	33-66	15-45	0	0
Illinois State	Ryan Pedon	Ohio State (asst.)	4	48-52	25-35	0	0
Indiana State	Matthew Graves	Indiana State (asso. HC)	2	14-18	8-12	0	0
Murray State	Ryan Miller	Creighton (asst.)	1	0-0	0-0	0	0
Northern Iowa	Ben Jacobson	Northern Iowa (asst.)	20	374-246	209-139	4	4
Southern Illinois	Scott Nagy	Wright State	2	14-19	8-12	0	0
UIC	Rob Ehsan	Stanford (asst.)	2	17-14	10-10	0	0
Valparaiso	Roger Powell Jr.	Gonzaga (asst.)	3	22-44	9-31	0	0

Notes:

- All records, appearances, titles, etc. are from time with current school only.
- Year at school includes the 2025–26 season.
- Overall and MVC records are from time at current school and are through the end of the 2024-25 season.

== Preseason ==
=== Preseason polls ===
The Missouri Valley Conference identified only the top five teams in its annual coaches, staff, and media poll for the 2025-26 season, and published its list of preseason conference "players to watch".

When the league fell short with that poll in late September, the MVC media collaborated and conducted a poll among 20 league beat writers to establish a ranking for all 11 teams, plus the conventional first and second All-Valley team selections.

Rank	Team
1.	Illinois State (14)
2.	Northern Iowa (1)
3.	Bradley (2)
4.	Murray State (2)
5.	Belmont
6.	Drake (1)
7.	Southern Illinois
8.	UIC
9.	Indiana State
10.	Valparaiso
11.	Evansville
(first-place votes)

=== Preseason Missouri Valley media teams ===
Honor	Recipient
MVC Media First Team	Chase Walker, Illinois State
MVC Media First Team	Johnny Kinziger, Illinois State
MVC Media First Team	Tyler Lundblade, Belmont
MVC Media First Team	Trey Campbell, Northern Iowa
MVC Media First Team	Jaquan Johnson, Bradley
MVC Media Second Team	Connor Turnbull, Evansville
MVC Media Second Team	Fred King, Murray State
MVC Media Second Team	Isaiah Stafford, Southern Illinois
MVC Media Second Team	Ahmad Henderson II, UIC
MVC Media Second Team	Demarion Burch, Bradley

== Regular season ==
=== Early season tournaments ===
The following table summarizes the multiple-team events (MTE) or early-season tournaments in which teams from the Missouri Valley Conference will participate.

Team	Tournament	Dates	Result
Belmont	Coconut Hoops	November 24-26	Royal Palm Division; Champions
Bradley	ESPN Events Invitational	November 24-26	Adventure Bracket; 3rd Place
Drake	Emerald Coast Classic	November 28-29	Lost vs LSU†; Won vs Georgia Tech†
Evansville	Paradise Jam	November 21-24	5th Place
Illinois State	ESPN Events Invitational	November 27-28	Imagination Bracket; Champions
Indiana State	Louisiana Tech MTE	November 26-29	Lost vs Louisiana Tech†; Lost vs Alcorn State†
Murray State	Cayman Islands Classic	November 23-25	Lost vs Middle Tennessee†; Lost vs McNeese†; Won vs George Washington†
Northern Iowa	Acrisure Holiday Invitational	November 25-26	2nd Place
Southern Illinois	Jacksonville Classic	November 23-25	Won vs Delaware†; Lost vs UAB†
UIC	Boardwalk Battle	November 20–22	3rd Place
Valparaiso	BBN United Tipoff Classic	November 4-14	Won vs Eastern Illinois; Won vs Nicholls; Lost at Kentucky

† Denotes Neutral Site

== MVC records vs other conferences ==
The MVC has a record of 75–46 in non-conference play during the regular season.
The MVC has a record of 0–0 during tournament play.

Regular season

Power Conferences
Conference	Record
ACC	1–3
Big East	0–1
Big Ten	0–3
Big 12	0–0
SEC	0–2
Combined	1–9

Other conferences
Conference	Record
American	1–7
American East	2–0
ASUN	3–0
Atlantic 10	2–3
Big Sky	1–0
Big South	1–1
Big West	4–1
CAA	2–2
C-USA	4–4
Horizon	4–2
Independents	0–0
Ivy League	2–1
MAAC	0–0
MAC	8–2
MEAC	0–0
Mountain West	1–2
NEC	3–0
Ohio Valley	10–3
Patriot League	0–0
Southern	2–0
Southland	2–1
SWAC	1–2
Summit	4–2
Sun Belt	1–0
WCC	2–3
WAC	0–1
Non-Division I	14–0
Combined	74–37

Thru January 24, 2026

Postseason

Power Conferences
Conference	Record
ACC	0–0
Big East	0–0
Big Ten	0–0
Big 12	0–0
SEC	0–0
Combined	0–0

Other conferences
Conference	Record
American	0–0
American East	0–0
ASUN	0–0
Atlantic 10	0–0
Big Sky	0–0
Big South	0–0
Big West	0–0
CAA	0–0
C-USA	0–0
Horizon	0–0
Independents	0–0
Ivy League	0–0
MAAC	0–0
MAC	0–0
MEAC	0–0
Mountain West	0–0
NEC	0–0
Ohio Valley	0–0
Patriot League	0–0
Southern	0–0
Southland	0–0
SWAC	0–0
Summit	0–0
Sun Belt	0–0
WCC	0–0
WAC	0–0
Combined	0–0

Thru March 2026

=== Record against ranked opponents ===
This is a list of games against ranked opponents only (rankings from the AP Poll at time of the game):

Date	Visitor	Home	Site	Significance	Score	Conference record
Nov. 4	Evansville	No. 1 Purdue	Mackey Arena; West Lafayette, IN	-	51-82	0-1
Nov. 7	Valparaiso	No. 9 Kentucky	Rupp Arena; Lexington, KY	BBN United Tipoff Classic	59-107	0-2
Nov. 14	Indiana State	No. 4 Duke	Cameron Indoor Stadium; Durham, NC	−	62-100	0−3

† Denotes Neutral Site
Thru January 24, 2026

=== Conference matrix ===
This table summarizes the head-to-head results between teams in conference play.
Thru January 24, 2026

	Belmont	Bradley	Drake	Evansville	Illinois State	Indiana State	Murray State	Northern Iowa	Southern Illinois	UIC	Valpo
vs BU	–	0-1	0-1	0-1	0-1	1-0	0-0	0-1	1-1	0-1	0-1
vs BR	1-0	–	0-1	0-2	1-0	0-2	1-0	0-1	0-1	0-0	0-0
vs DU	1-0	1-0	–	0-1	1-0	0-2	1-1	0-0	0-1	1-0	0-0
vs UE	1-0	2-0	1-0	–	1-0	0-1	1-0	1-0	0-0	1-0	0-0
vs IlSU	1-0	0-1	0-1	0-1	–	1-1	0-0	0-1	0-1	1-0	1-0
vs InSU	0-1	2-0	2-0	1-0	1-1	–	1-0	1-0	0-0	0-0	0-0
vs MrSU	0-0	0-1	1-1	0-1	0-0	0-1	–	0-0	0-1	0-1	0-2
vs UNI	1-0	1-0	0-0	0-1	1-0	0-1	0-0	–	0-0	1-1	1-1
vs SIU	1-1	1-0	1-0	0-0	1-0	0-0	1-0	0-0	–	1-0	1-1
vs UIC	1-0	0-0	0-1	0-1	0-1	0-0	1-0	1-1	0-1	–	1-0
vs VU	1-0	0-0	0-0	0-0	0-1	0-0	2-0	1-1	1-1	0-1	–
Total	8–2	7–3	5–5	1–8	6–4	2–8	8–1	4–5	2–7	5–4	4–5

=== Player of the week ===
Periodically, throughout the season, the Missouri Valley Conference named a player of the week, a newcomer of the week, and a freshman of the week.

Date	Player of the week	Newcomer of the week	Freshman of the week
November 10, 2025	Jaquan Johnson, Bradley	Ian Scott, Indiana State	Ty’Reek Coleman, Illinois State
November 17, 2025	Javon Jackson, Murray State	Quel'Ron House, Southern Illinois	Rakim Chaney, Valparaiso
November 24, 2025	Trey Campbell, Northern Iowa	Mekhi Lowery, UIC	Rakim Chaney (2), Valparaiso
December 1, 2025	Tyler Lundblade, Belmont	Jalen Quinn, Drake	Roman Domon, Murray State
December 8, 2025	Connor Turnbull, Evansville	Owen Dease, Valparaiso	Mason Klabo, Illinois State
December 15, 2025	Leon Bond III, Northern Iowa	Layne Taylor, Murray State	Jack Smiley, Belmont
December 23, 2025	Jaquan Johnson (2), Bradley	Fred King, Murray State	Roman Domon (2), Murray State
January 5, 2026	Chase Walker, Illinois State	Owen Dease (2), Valparaiso	JT Pettigrew, Valparaiso
January 12, 2026	Drew Scharnowski, Belmont	Abdul Momoh, UIC	Roman Domon (3), Murray State
January 19, 2026	Chase Walker (2), Illinois State	Owen Dease (3), Valparaiso	Eoin Dillon, Belmont
January 26, 2026	Jalen Quinn, Drake	Elijah Crawford, UIC	Eoin Dillon (2), Belmont
February 2, 2026	Alex Huibregtse, Bradley	Jalen Quinn (2), Drake	Eoin Dillon (3), Belmont
February 9, 2026	Fred King, Murray State	Quel'Ron House (2), Southern Illinois	Roman Domon (4), Murray State
February 16, 2026	Jaquan Johnson (3), Bradley	Elijah Crawford (2), UIC	JT Pettigrew (2), Valparaiso
February 23, 2026	Quel'Ron House, Southern Illinois	Elijah Crawford (3), UIC	JT Pettigrew (3), Valparaiso
March 2, 2026	AJ Casey, Evansville	Boden Skunberg, Illinois State	JT Pettigrew (4), Valparaiso

== Honors and awards ==
=== All-Conference awards and teams ===
The MVC announced its all-conference teams and major honors on March 4, 2026.

Honor	Recipient
Larry Bird Player of the Year	Tyler Lundblade, Belmont
Coach of the Year	Casey Alexander, Belmont
Defensive MVP	Jaquan Johnson, Bradley
Sixth Man of the Year	Roman Domon, Murray State
Newcomer of the Year	Fred King, Murray State
Freshman of the Year	Roman Doman, Murray State
First Team
First Team	Jaquan Johnson, Bradley
First Team	Fred King, Murray State
First Team	Tyler Lundblade, Belmont
First Team	Chase Walker, Illinois State
First Team	Drew Scharnowski, Belmont
First Team	Jalen Quinn, Drake
Second Team
Second Team	Trey Campbell, Northern Iowa
Second Team	Elijah Crawford, UIC
Second Team	Quel'Ron House, S. Illinois
Second Team	Javon Jackson, Murray State
Second Team	Sam Orme, Belmont
Third Team	AJ Casey, Evansville
Third Team	Owen Dease, Valparaiso
Third Team	Roman Domon, Murray State
Third Team	Alex Huibregtse, Bradley
Third Team	JT Pettigrew, Valparaiso

== Postseason ==
=== MVC Tournament ===
Opening Round; March 5 MVC TV Network/ESPN+
8	Southern Illinois	63
9	Drake	67
7	Valparaiso	63
10	Indiana State	62
6	Northern Iowa	68
11	Evansville	59

Quarterfinals; March 6 MVC TV Network/ESPN+
1	Belmont	79
9	Drake	100
4	Murray State	79
5	UIC	92
2	Bradley	90
7	Valparaiso	84 ^{2OT}
3	Illinois State	52
6	Northern Iowa	74

Semifinals; March 7 CBSSN
9	Drake	51
5	UIC	72
2	Bradley	69
6	Northern Iowa	73

Final; March 8 CBS/Paramount+
5	UIC	69
6	Northern Iowa	84

=== NCAA Tournament ===
The winner of the MVC tournament will receive the conference's automatic bid to the NCAA Tournament.

Seed	Region	School	Round of 64	Round of 32	Sweet Sixteen	Elite Eight	Final Four	Championship
12	East	Northern Iowa	L 53–79 vs. (12) St. John's	DNP				
		W–L (%):	0–1 (.000)	0–0 (–)	0–0 (–)	0–0 (–)	0–0 (–)	0–0 (–)
Total: 0–1 (.000)

=== National Invitation Tournament ===
Seed	Bracket	School	1st round	2nd round	Quarterfinals	Semifinals	Championship
4	Winston-Salem	Illinois State	W 79–58 vs. Kent State	W 78–75 at (1) Wake Forest	W 61–55 at (2) Dayton	L 66–88 vs. (1) Auburn	DNP
	Auburn	Murray State	L 75–89 at (2) Nevada	DNP			
	Winston-Salem	Bradley	L 66–80 vs. (2) Dayton	DNP			
	Albuquerque	UIC	L 73–91 at (2) California	DNP			
		W–L (%):	1–3 (.250)	1–0 (1.000)	1–0 (1.000)	0–1 (.000)	0–0 (–)
Total: 3–4 (.429)
