= 2026–27 Drake Bulldogs men's basketball team =

American college basketball season

2026–27 Drake Bulldogs men's basketball
- Conference: Missouri Valley Conference
- Record: 4–2 (0–0 MVC)
- Head coach: Eric Henderson (2nd season)
- Assistant coaches: Rob Klinkefus; Tramel Barnes; Billy Brown; Warren Niles; Gavin Block
- Home arena: Knapp Center (Capacity: 6,424)

2026–27 Missouri Valley Conference men's basketball standings
	Conf.				Overall
Team	W		L	PCT	W		L	PCT
Murray State	0	–	0	–	6	–	1	.857
Belmont	0	–	0	–	4	–	1	.800
Drake	0	–	0	–	4	–	1	.800
UIC	0	–	0	–	4	–	1	.800
Valparaiso	0	–	0	–	3	–	1	.750
Evansville	0	–	0	–	3	–	2	.600
Bradley	0	–	0	–	3	–	3	.500
Illinois State	0	–	0	–	3	–	3	.500
Northern Iowa	0	–	0	–	3	–	3	.500
Indiana State	0	–	0	–	2	–	3	.400
Southern Illinois	0	–	0	–	2	–	3	.400
† 2027 MVC tournament winner As of November 22, 2026; Rankings from AP poll

The 2026–27 Drake Bulldogs men's basketball team will represent Drake University in the 2026–27 NCAA Division I men's basketball season. The Bulldogs, led by Eric Henderson in his second season as head coach, will play their home games at the Knapp Center in Des Moines, Iowa as members of the Missouri Valley Conference (MVC).

The Bulldogs will have a returning head coach and several returning players for the first time since the 2023–24 season.

== Previous season ==
The Bulldogs entered the 2025–26 season as the defending Arch Madness champions and were picked to finish sixth in the conference for the upcoming season.

The Bulldogs finished the 2025–26 season 14–20, 6–14 in MVC play to finish in ninth place. In the MVC tournament, they defeated Southern Illinois before upsetting the top-seeded Belmont Bruins in the quarterfinal. However, the Bulldogs would lose in the semifinal to the eventual tournament runner-up UIC Flames. Drake's 14–20 record marked the team's lowest win percentage since the 2016–17 season, in which the Bulldogs went 7–24, with head coach Ray Giacoletti resigning after 8 games.

== Offseason ==
=== Departures ===
Name	Number	Pos.	Height	Weight	Year	Hometown	Reason for departure
Braden Appelhans	0	G	6'6"	190	RS Jr	Blue Springs, MO	Transferred to Xavier
Jalen Quinn	3	G	6'3"	190	Sr	Tuscola, IL	Graduated
Wilguens Jr. Exacte	7	F	6'6"	230	Jr	Montreal, QC	Transferred to Mount St. Mary's
Okku Federiko	8	F	6'9"	210	So	Helsinki, FI	Transferred to Northwestern
Jaehshon Thomas	22	G	6'3"	185	Sr	Aurora, IL	Graduated
Isaiah Carr	24	C	6'11"	235	Sr	Las Cruces, NM	Graduated
Heri Bukinga	32	F/C	6'11	235	RS Fr	Goma, DRC	Transferred to Omaha

=== Incoming transfers ===
Name	Number	Pos.	Height	Weight	Year	Hometown	Previous School
Justin Burns	5	F	6'6"	205	Jr	Albany, GA	Northwest Florida
Jon Carroll	22	F	6'7"	215	Sr	Tallahassee, FL	Morehead State
Dre Kindell	3	G	6'0"	175	Sr	Cincinnati, OH	Wichita State
Gabe Oldham	32	F	6'8"	230	Sr	Tucson, AZ	Denver

=== 2026 Recruiting Class ===
College recruiting
Name	Hometown	School	Height	Weight	Commit date
Gio Quiles; SG	Des Moines, IA	Dowling Catholic HS	6 ft 4 in (1.93 m)	195 lb (88 kg)	May 1, 2026
Gio Quiles; SG	Recruit ratings: 247Sports:				
Dothan Ijadimbola; SF	Brooklyn Park, MN	Totino-Grace HS	6 ft 5 in (1.96 m)	180 lb (82 kg)	Aug 4, 2025
Dothan Ijadimbola; SF	Recruit ratings: 247Sports:				
Miles Flemons; C	Tulsa, OK	Union HS (OK)	6 ft 7 in (2.01 m)	255 lb (116 kg)	Sep 15, 2025
Miles Flemons; C	Recruit ratings: 247Sports:				
Overall recruit ranking: On3: - ESPN: -
Note: In many cases, Scout, Rivals, 247Sports, On3, and ESPN may conflict in their listings of height and weight.; In these cases, the average was taken. ESPN grades are on a 100-point scale.; Sources: "2026 Team Ranking". Rivals.

== Preseason ==
On April 23, it was announced that Drake would participate in the 2026 Hall of Fame Classic at the T-Mobile Center in Kansas City. The Bulldogs will face off against Wichita State on December 18 as part of a doubleheader which also includes Iowa State taking on Missouri State. The last time the Bulldogs and Shockers faced off was in the 2021 NCAA Tournament First Four, where Drake emerged victorious 53–52 and won their first NCAA Tournament game in 50 years.

== Roster ==
2026–27 Drake Bulldogs men's basketball team
Players
Coaches

Pos.	#	Name	Height	Weight	Year	Previous school	Hometown
G	0	Dothan Ijadimbola	6 ft 4 in (1.93 m)	210 lb (95 kg)	Fr	Totino-Grace	Minneapolis, MN
G	1	Owen Larson	6 ft 1 in (1.85 m)	195 lb (88 kg)	Jr	South Dakota State	Estherville, IA
F	2	Griffen Goodbary	6 ft 10 in (2.08 m)	230 lb (104 kg)	So	Sioux Falls Christian	Sioux Falls, SD
G	3	Dre Kindell	5 ft 11 in (1.8 m)	165 lb (75 kg)	Sr	Wichita State University	Cincinnati, OH
F	4	Jon Carroll	6 ft 7 in (2.01 m)	220 lb (100 kg)	Sr	Morehead State	Tallahassee, FL
F	6	Justin Burns	6 ft 6 in (1.98 m)	210 lb (95 kg)	Jr	Northwest Florida State	Albany, GA
G	7	Gio Quiles	6 ft 3 in (1.91 m)	195 lb (88 kg)	Fr	Dowling Catholic	West Des Moines, IA
G	10	Eli Shetlar	6 ft 6 in (1.98 m)	190 lb (86 kg)	RS Jr	Indiana State	Wichita, KS
G	11	LJ Rush	5 ft 10 in (1.78 m)	170 lb (77 kg)	RS Fr	1 of 1 Academy	Wendell, NC
G	13	Mason Matulis	6 ft 5 in (1.96 m)	175 lb (79 kg)	Fr	Booker T. Washington	Tulsa, OK
G	20	Bryson Bahl	6 ft 4 in (1.93 m)	180 lb (82 kg)	RS Fr	Papillion-La Vista South	Papillion, NE
G	21	Andrew Alia	6 ft 3 in (1.91 m)	195 lb (88 kg)	RS Sr	St Joseph	Kenosha, WI
F	22	Miles Flemons	6 ft 8 in (2.03 m)	305 lb (138 kg)	Fr	Tulsa Union	Tulsa, OK
F	32	Gabe Oldham	6 ft 8 in (2.03 m)	230 lb (104 kg)	Sr	Denver	Spanish Fork, UT

Head coach

- Eric Henderson (Wayne State (NE))

Assistant coach(es)

- Rob Klinkefus (Buena Vista)
  (Drake)
- Tramel Barnes (Southwest Minnesota State)
- Billy Brown (North Dakota)
- Warren Niles (Oral Roberts)
- Gavin Block (Ohio)

Legend

- (C) Team captain
- (S) Suspended
- (I) Ineligible
- (W) Walk-on
- Injured
- Current redshirt

Roster
Last update: July 13, 2026

== Schedule and results ==
Date time, TV	Rank^{#}	Opponent^{#}	Result	Record	High points	High rebounds	High assists	Site (attendance) city, state
Regular Season
November 4, 2026*; 6:30 p.m., ESPN+		Central (IA) (D-III)	W 101–48	1–0	20 – Carroll	8 – Burns	5 – Tied	Knapp Center (3,081); Des Moines, IA
November 8*; 2:00 p.m, ESPN+		Southern	W 75–68	2–0	21 – Carroll	11 – Carroll	4 – Larson	Knapp Center (2,965); Des Moines, IA
November 13*; 6:30 p.m., ESPN+		South Dakota	W 81–72	3–0	26 – Carroll	10 – Carroll	4 – Larson	Knapp Center (3,343); Des Moines, IA
November 16*; 6:30 p.m., ESPN+		Tarleton State	L 79–83	3–1	17 – Kindell	12 – Alia	5 – Kindell	Knapp Center (2,993); Des Moines, IA
November 19*; 6:30 p.m., ESPN+		Charleston						Knapp Center; Des Moines, IA
November 21*; 2:00 p.m., ESPN+		at Missouri State						Great Southern Bank Arena; Springfield, MO
November 27*; 2:30 p.m., YouTube		vs. Boise State; Snake River Invitational						Mountain America Center; Idaho Falls, ID
November 28*; 3:00 p.m., YouTube		vs. North Dakota State; Snake River Invitational						Mountain America Center; Idaho Falls, ID
November 29*; 3:30 p.m., YouTube		vs. North Texas; Snake River Invitational						Mountain America Center; Idaho Falls, ID
December 5*; 1:30 p.m., FS1		at Michigan State						Breslin Center; East Lansing, MI
December 11*; 6:30 p.m., TBD		North Carolina Central						Knapp Center; Des Moines, IA
December 15; 7:00 p.m., TBD		at Evansville						Ford Center; Evansville, IN
December 18*; 6:00 p.m., CBSSN		vs. Davidson; NABC Hall of Fame Classic						T-Mobile Center; Kansas City, MO
December 22; 6:00 p.m., TBD		Southern Illinois						Knapp Center; Des Moines, IA
December 29; TBD, TBD		at Indiana State						Hulman Center; Terre Haute, IN
January 1, 2027; TBD, TBD		at Murray State						CFSB Center; Murray, KY
January 5; 6:30 p.m., TBD		Belmont						Knapp Center; Des Moines, IA
January 12; TBD, TBD		Valparaiso						Knapp Center; Des Moines, IA
January 16; TBD, TBD		at Bradley						Carver Arena; Peoria, IL
January 18; TBD, TBD		at Illinois State						CEFCU Arena; Normal, IL
January 21; TBD, TBD		UIC						Knapp Center; Des Moines, IA
January 24; TBD, TBD		Murray State						Knapp Center; Des Moines, IA
January 27; 6:30 p.m., TBD		at Belmont						Curb Event Center; Nashville, TN
January 30; TBD, TBD		Northern Iowa; Rivalry						Knapp Center; Des Moines, IA
February 3 TBD, TBD		at Valparaiso						The ARC; Valparaiso, IN
February 6 TBD, TBD		Evansville						Knapp Center; Des Moines, IA
February 9 TBD, TBD		at Southern Illinois						Banterra Center; Carbondale, IL
February 12; TBD, TBD		Bradley						Knapp Center; Des Moines, IA
February 18; 6:30 p.m., TBD		Indiana State						Knapp Center; Des Moines, IA
February 21; TBD, TBD		at Northern Iowa						McLeod Center; Cedar Falls, IA
February 24; 6:30 p.m., TBD		Illinois State						Knapp Center; Des Moines, IA
February 28; TBD, TBD		at UIC						Credit Union 1 Arena; Chicago, IL
Conference Tournament
March 2027; TBD	(#)	vs. (#) TBD; Arch Madness Opening Round						Enterprise Center; St. Louis, MO
*Non-conference game. ^{#}Rankings from AP Poll. (#) Tournament seedings in parentheses. All times are in Central Time Zone.

== See also ==
- 2026–27 Drake Bulldogs women's basketball team
