= 2026–27 Murray State Racers men's basketball team =

American college basketball season

2026–27 Murray State Racers men's basketball
- Conference: Missouri Valley Conference
- Record: 5–1 (0–0 MVC)
- Head coach: Ryan Miller (2nd season)
- Associate head coach: Tony Barbee
- Assistant coaches: Jordan VerHulst; Cullen Neal; Mardracus Wade; Luke Adams
- Home arena: CFSB Center

2026–27 Missouri Valley Conference men's basketball standings
	Conf.				Overall
Team	W		L	PCT	W		L	PCT
Murray State	0	–	0	–	5	–	1	.833
Belmont	0	–	0	–	4	–	1	.800
Drake	0	–	0	–	4	–	1	.800
UIC	0	–	0	–	4	–	1	.800
Valparaiso	0	–	0	–	3	–	1	.750
Evansville	0	–	0	–	3	–	2	.600
Bradley	0	–	0	–	3	–	3	.500
Illinois State	0	–	0	–	3	–	3	.500
Northern Iowa	0	–	0	–	3	–	3	.500
Indiana State	0	–	0	–	2	–	2	.500
Southern Illinois	0	–	0	–	2	–	2	.500
† 2027 MVC tournament winner As of November 20, 2026; Rankings from AP poll

The 2026–27 Murray State Racers men's basketball team will represent Murray State University during the 2026–27 NCAA Division I men's basketball season. The Racers, led by second-year head coach Ryan Miller, played their home games at the CFSB Center in Murray, Kentucky as members of the Missouri Valley Conference.

== Previous season ==
The Racers finished the 2025–26 season 20–13, 12–8 in MVC play to finish in fourth place. In the MVC tournament, they lost to UIC in the quarterfinals.

== Roster ==
2025–26 Murray State Racers men's basketball team
Players
Coaches

Pos.	#	Name	Height	Weight	Year	Previous school	Hometown
G	0	Kaden Magwood	6 ft 2 in (1.88 m)	175 lb (79 kg)	So	Auburn	Louisville, Kentucky
G/F	2	Mathis Courbon	6 ft 6 in (1.98 m)	190 lb (86 kg)	So	Lycee Albert Thomas HS	Lyon, France
G	4	Mark Padjen	6 ft 6 in (1.98 m)	—	Fr	KK Ilirija	Ljubljana, Slovenia
G	6	Christian Jones	6 ft 4 in (1.93 m)	200 lb (91 kg)	RS Jr	George Washington	Stratford, Connecticut
G	7	Ben Shtolzberg	6 ft 4 in (1.93 m)	195 lb (88 kg)	RS Sr	UC Santa Barbara	Northridge, California
G	8	Talis Soulhac	6 ft 2 in (1.88 m)	—	Fr	ADA Blois Basket 41	Charenton-le-Pont, France
F	9	Pavle Nikolic	6 ft 8 in (2.03 m)	—	Fr	KK Borac Čačak	Čačak, Serbia
F	11	Brigham Rogers	6 ft 9 in (2.06 m)	240 lb (109 kg)	Sr	Belmont	Woodstock, Georgia
G	13	Navon Shabazz	6 ft 3 in (1.91 m)	170 lb (77 kg)	Fr	Iowa United Prep	Des Moines, Iowa
G/F	14	Lachlan Crate	6 ft 8 in (2.03 m)	215 lb (98 kg)	RS Fr	Feilding HS	Feilding, New Zealand
F	16	Jonas Boulefaa	6 ft 10 in (2.08 m)	235 lb (107 kg)	Fr	Pôle France	Saint Sauveur de Meilhan, France
F	23	Shon Tupuola	6 ft 10 in (2.08 m)	245 lb (111 kg)	Sr	Valparaiso	Brownsburg, Indiana
G	25	Dillon Butler	6 ft 3 in (1.91 m)	192 lb (87 kg)	RS Fr	Tipton-Rosemark Academy	Memphis, Tennessee
G	34	Brayden Shorter	6 ft 5 in (1.96 m)	210 lb (95 kg)	Sr	Washburn	Springfield, Missouri
G/F	77	Roman Domon	6 ft 9 in (2.06 m)	225 lb (102 kg)	So	BCM Gravelines-Dunkerque	Dreuil-lès-Amiens, France

Head coach

- Ryan Miller (Northern State)

Assistant coach(es)

- Tony Barbee (associate head coach) (UMass)
- Jordan VerHulst (Grand Valley State)
- Cullen Neal (New Mexico)
- Mardracus Wade (Arkansas)
- Luke Adams (Texas Tech)

Legend

- (C) Team captain
- (S) Suspended
- (I) Ineligible
- (W) Walk-on
- Injured
- Current redshirt

Roster
Last update: October 19, 2026

== Schedule and results ==
Date time, TV	Rank^{#}	Opponent^{#}	Result	Record	Site (attendance) city, state
Exhibition season
October 7, 2026*; 6:30 p.m.		at Wichita State	W 93–87		Charles Koch Arena; Wichita, KS
October 17, 2026*; 3:30 p.m.		at Incarnate Word	W 93–66		McDermott Center; San Antonio, TX
October 22, 2026*; 5:00 p.m.		at FIU	W 86–79		Ocean Bank Convocation Center (732); Miami, FL
Non-conference regular season
November 2, 2026*; 10:30 a.m., YouTube		vs. Tennessee State; Field of 68 Opening Day Marathon	W 90–53	1–0	Sanford Pentagon; Sioux Falls, SD
November 7, 2026*; 7:00 p.m.		Northwestern State	W 93–71	2–0	CFSB Center; Murray, KY
November 10, 2026*; 7:00 p.m.		Alcorn State	W 94–57	3–0	CFSB Center; Murray, KY
November 13, 2026*; 7:00 p.m.		Texas Southern	W 99–78	4–0	CFSB Center; Murray, KY
November 17, 2026*; 11:00 a.m.		vs. Hofstra; Savage Brothers Showcase	W 82–66	5–0	Landers Center; Southaven, MS
November 19, 2026*; 5:00 p.m., CBSSN		vs. NC State; Baha Mar Championship Semifinals	L 83–93	5–1	Baha Mar Convention Center (1,277); Nassau, Bahamas
November 20, 2026*; 6:00 p.m., CBSSN		vs. Wisconsin; Baha Mar Championship 3rd place game			Baha Mar Convention Center; Nassau, Bahamas
November 30, 2026*; 7:00 p.m.		Washington State			CFSB Center; Murray, KY
December 2, 2026*; 7:00 p.m.		Chicago State			CFSB Center; Murray, KY
December 6, 2026*; 3:00 p.m.		vs. Georgia Tech; Bad Boy Mowers Series - Nashville			Bridgestone Arena; Nashville, TN
December 9, 2026*; 7:00 p.m.		Arkansas-Pine Bluff			CFSB Center; Murray, KY
December 12, 2026*; TBA		vs. Santa Clara; Jack Jones Classic			Lee's Family Forum; Henderson, NV
Conference regular season
December 17, 2026; 5:00 p.m.		Illinois State			CFSB Center; Murray, KY
December 19, 2026; TBA		at Indiana State			Hulman Center; Terre Haute, IN
December 29, 2026; TBA		UIC			CFSB Center; Murray, KY
January 1, 2027; TBA		Drake			CFSB Center; Murray, KY
January 4, 2027; TBA		at Bradley			Carver Arena; Peoria, IL
January 9, 2027; TBA		Evansville			CFSB Center; Murray, KY
January 12, 2027; TBA		at Southern Illinois			Banterra Center; Carbondale, IL
January 16, 2027; TBA		Indiana State			CFSB Center; Murray, KY
January 21, 2027; TBA		at Northern Iowa			McLeod Center; Cedar Falls, IA
January 24, 2027; TBA		at Drake			The Knapp Center; Des Moines, IA
January 27, 2027; TBA		Bradley			CFSB Center; Murray, KY
January 30, 2027; TBA		Valparaiso			CFSB Center; Murray, KY
February 3, 2027; TBA		at UIC			Credit Union 1 Arena; Chicago, IL
February 6, 2027; TBA		Belmont			CFSB Center; Murray, KY
February 9, 2027; TBA		at Evansville			Ford Center; Evansville, IN
February 12, 2027; TBA		at Illinois State			CEFCU Arena; Normal, IL
February 15, 2027; TBA		Southern Illinois			CFSB Center; Murray, KY
February 20, 2027; TBA		at Belmont			Curb Event Center; Nashville, TN
February 24, 2027; TBA		Northern Iowa; Senior Night			CFSB Center; Murray, KY
February 27, 2027; TBA		at Valparaiso			Athletics–Recreation Center; Valparaiso, IN
Conference tournament
March 3-7, 2027*; TBA		vs. Arch Madness			Enterprise Center; St. Louis, MO
*Non-conference game. ^{#}Rankings from AP Poll. (#) Tournament seedings in parentheses. AU=Auburn. All times are in Central Time Zone.
