= 2026–27 Belmont Bruins men's basketball team =

American college basketball season

2026–1927 Belmont Bruins men's basketball
- Conference: Missouri Valley Conference
- Record: 2–0 (0–0 MVC)
- Head coach: Evan Bradds (1st season)
- Associate head coach: Brian Ayers
- Assistant coaches: Brendan Mullins; Marcus Belcher; Ja'Darius Harris
- Home arena: Curb Event Center

2026–27 Missouri Valley Conference men's basketball standings
| | Conf. | | | | Overall |
| Team | W | | L | PCT | W | | L | PCT |
|---|---|---|---|---|---|---|---|---|
| Murray State | 0 | – | 0 | – | 5 | – | 0 | 1.000 |
| Belmont | 0 | – | 0 | – | 3 | – | 1 | .750 |
| Drake | 0 | – | 0 | – | 3 | – | 1 | .750 |
| UIC | 0 | – | 0 | – | 3 | – | 1 | .750 |
| Valparaiso | 0 | – | 0 | – | 3 | – | 1 | .750 |
| Southern Illinois | 0 | – | 0 | – | 2 | – | 1 | .667 |
| Bradley | 0 | – | 0 | – | 3 | – | 2 | .600 |
| Evansville | 0 | – | 0 | – | 2 | – | 2 | .500 |
| Indiana State | 0 | – | 0 | – | 2 | – | 2 | .500 |
| Northern Iowa | 0 | – | 0 | – | 2 | – | 3 | .400 |
| Illinois State | 0 | – | 0 | – | 1 | – | 3 | .250 |
† 2027 MVC tournament winner As of November 18, 2026; Rankings from AP poll

The 2026–27 Belmont Bruins men's basketball team will represent Belmont University during the 2026–27 NCAA Division I men's basketball season. The Bruins, led by first-year head coach Evan Bradds, will play their home games at the Curb Event Center in Nashville, Tennessee as a member of the Missouri Valley Conference.

== Offseason ==
=== Departures ===
Belmont departures
| Name | Number | Pos. | Height | Weight | Year | Hometown | Reason for departure |
|---|---|---|---|---|---|---|---|
| Win Miller | 0 | G | 6'3" | 190 | Junior | Vestavia Hills, AL | Transferred to Samford |
| Nic McClain | 1 | G | 6'3" | 200 | GS | Jennings, FL | Graduated |
| Aidan Noyes | 4 | F | 6'7" | 200 | RS-Senior | Cincinnati, OH | Graduated |
| Tyler Lundblade | 8 | G | 6'5" | 195 | GS | Dallas, TX | Transferred to Tennessee |
| Drew Scharnowski | 11 | F | 6'9" | 230 | RS-Sophomore | Burlington, IL | Transferred to Duke |
| Brigham Rogers | 12 | F | 6'9" | 240 | Junior | Woodstock, GA | Transferred to Murray State |
| Sam Orme | 14 | F | 6'9" | 225 | Rs-Sophomore | Carmel, IN | Transferred to Nebraska |
| Jake Dykstra | 23 | G | 6'4" | 200 | Senior | Nashville, TN | Graduated |
| Keith Robbins | 24 | G | 6'4" | 180 | Senior | Milledgeville, GA | Graduated |

=== Incoming transfers ===
Belmont incoming transfers
| Name | Number | Pos | Height | Weight | Year | Hometown | Previous school | Years remaining | Date eligible |
|---|---|---|---|---|---|---|---|---|---|
| Ethan Sage | 0 | G/F | 6'7" | 200 | Sophomore | Weatherford, OK | Pittsburg State | 3 | October 1, 2026 |
| Matthew Zobrist | 1 | G | 6'5" | 205 | Sophomore | Metamora, IL | Bradley | 3 | October 1, 2026 |
| Aleksa Ristic | 4 | G | 6'3" | 200 | Sophomore | Nis, Serbia | Indiana | 3 | October 1, 2026 |
| Vincent Neugebauer | 9 | C | 7'1" | 240 | Senior | Paderborn, Germany | FAU | 1 | October 1, 2026 |
| Kayden Fish | 11 | F | 6'6" | 245 | Rs-Junior | Kansas City, MO | Ball State | 2 | October 1, 2026 |

=== Recruiting classes ===
==== 2026 recruiting class ====
College recruiting
| Name | Hometown | School | Height | Weight | Commit date |
|---|---|---|---|---|---|
| Eli Brown; G | Murfreesboro, TN | Brentwood Academy | 6 ft 2 in (1.88 m) | 185 lb (84 kg) | May 15, 2026 |
| Eli Brown; G | Recruit ratings: No ratings found | | | | |
| Cooper Knowles; F | Niota, IL | Warsaw High School (Illinois) | 6 ft 10 in (2.08 m) | 210 lb (95 kg) | Jun 14, 2026 |
| Cooper Knowles; F | Recruit ratings: No ratings found | | | | |
| Charlie Gersmehl; F | Cumming, GA | Gainesville High School (Georgia) | 6 ft 8 in (2.03 m) | 215 lb (98 kg) | Jul 20, 2025 |
| Charlie Gersmehl; F | Recruit ratings: No ratings found | | | | |

==== 2027 recruiting class ====
College recruiting (2027)
| Name | Hometown | School | Height | Weight | Commit date |
|---|---|---|---|---|---|
| | | | N/A | N/A | |
Recruit ratings: No ratings found

== Roster ==
2026–27 Belmont Bruins men's basketball team
Players
Coaches

| Pos. | # | Name | Height | Weight | Year | Hometown |
|---|---|---|---|---|---|---|
| G/F | 0 | Ethan Sage | 6 ft 7 in (2.01 m) | 200 lb (91 kg) | So | Weatherford, OK |
| G | 1 | Matthew Zobrist | 6 ft 5 in (1.96 m) | 205 lb (93 kg) | So | Metamora, IL |
| G | 2 | Jack Smiley | 6 ft 2 in (1.88 m) | 170 lb (77 kg) | So | Valparaiso, IN |
| G | 3 | Isaiah West | 6 ft 2 in (1.88 m) | 195 lb (88 kg) | Sr | Springfield, TN |
| G | 4 | Aleksa Ristic | 6 ft 3 in (1.91 m) | 200 lb (91 kg) | RS So | Nis, Serbia |
| F | 5 | Eoin Dillon | 6 ft 9 in (2.06 m) | 220 lb (100 kg) | RS So | Peoria, IL |
| G | 8 | Eli Brown | 6 ft 2 in (1.88 m) | 185 lb (84 kg) | Fr | Murfreesboro, TN |
| C | 9 | Vincent Neugebauer | 7 ft 1 in (2.16 m) | 240 lb (109 kg) | Sr | Oldenburg, Germany |
| G | 10 | Jabez Jenkins | 6 ft 4 in (1.93 m) | 200 lb (91 kg) | RS So | Covington, GA |
| F | 11 | Kayden Fish | 6 ft 6 in (1.98 m) | 245 lb (111 kg) | RS Jr | Kansas City, Mo |
| G | 13 | Cooper Haynes | 6 ft 2 in (1.88 m) | 195 lb (88 kg) | RS So | Memphis, TN |
| F | 22 | Cooper Knowles | 6 ft 10 in (2.08 m) | 210 lb (95 kg) | Fr | Niota, IL |
| F | 23 | Charlie Gersmehl | 6 ft 8 in (2.03 m) | 215 lb (98 kg) | Fr | Cumming, GA |
| F | 33 | Graydon Lemke | 6 ft 10 in (2.08 m) | 210 lb (95 kg) | RS So | Las Vegas, NV |
| C | | Bryce Bradley | — | — | RS So | Franklin, TN |

Head coach

- Evan Bradds (Belmont)

Assistant coach(es)

- Brian Ayers (Lipscomb)
- Brendan Mullins (Saint Michael's)
- Marcus Belcher (Southern Illinois)
- Ja'Darius Harris (North Carolina Central)

Legend

- (C) Team captain
- (S) Suspended
- (I) Ineligible
- (W) Walk-on
- Injured
- Current redshirt

Roster
Last update: May 17, 2026

== Schedule and results ==
| Date time, TV | Rank^{#} | Opponent^{#} | Result | Record | High points | High rebounds | High assists | Site (attendance) city, state |
Exhibition Season
| October 8, 2026*; 6:00 p.m., ACCNX | | at Duke | L 62–102 | | 11 – Zobrist | 5 – Neugebauer | 4 – West | Cameron Indoor Stadium; Durham, NC |
Non-Conference Regular Season
| November 2, 2026*; 6:30 p.m., ESPN+ | | Southern Indiana | | | | | | Curb Event Center; Nashville, TN |
| November 5, 2026*; 6:30 p.m., ESPN+ | | Centre | | | | | | Curb Event Center; Nashville, TN |
| November 10, 2026*; 7:00 p.m., ESPN+ | | at Lipscomb | | | | | | Allen Arena; Nashville, TN |
| November 14, 2026*; 7:30 p.m., ESPN+ | | Furman | | | | | | Curb Event Center; Nashville, TN |
| November 18, 2026*; 6:30 p.m., ESPN+ | | Union Commonwealth | | | | | | Curb Event Center; Nashville, TN |
| November 23, 2026*; 3:00 p.m., ESPNU | | vs. Yale; ESPN Events Invitational | | | | | | State Farm Field House; Kissimmee, FL |
| November 24, 2026*; 11:30 a.m., ESPN2 | | vs. Akron; ESPN Events Invitational | | | | | | State Farm Field House; Kissimmee, FL |
| November 25, 2026*; 9:00 a.m., ESPN2 | | vs. St. Bonaventure; ESPN Events Invitational | | | | | | State Farm Field House; Kissimmee, FL |
| December 1, 2026*; 6:30 p.m., ESPN+ | | at Western Kentucky | | | | | | E.A. Diddle Arena; Bowling Green, KY |
| December 5, 2026*; 7:00 p.m., ESPN+ | | Middle Tennessee | | | | | | Curb Event Center; Nashville, TN |
| December 8, 2026*; TBA | | at UAB | | | | | | Bartow Arena; Birmingham, AL |
| December 14, 2026*; 6:30 p.m., ESPN+ | | Charleston | | | Curb Event Center; Nashville, TN | | | |
Conference Regular Season
| December 18, 2026; 7:00 p.m., ESPN+ | | at Bradley | | | Carver Arena; Peoria, IL | | | |
| December 21, 2026; 8:00 p.m. | | at Illinois State | | | | | | CEFCU Arena; Normal, IL |
| December 29, 2026; 6:00 p.m. | | Northern Iowa | | | | | | Curb Event Center; Nashville, TN |
| January 1, 2027; 4:00 p.m. | | UIC | | | | | | Curb Event Center; Nashville, TN |
| January 5, 2027; 6:30 p.m. | | at Drake | | | | | | Knapp Center; Des Moines, IA |
| January 8, 2027; 7:00 p.m. | | Illinois State | | | | | | Curb Event Center; Nashville, TN |
| January 12, 2027; 7:00 p.m. | | at Evansville | | | | | | Ford Center; Evansville, IN |
| January 16, 2027; 4:00 p.m. | | Southern Illinois | | | | | | Curb Event Center; Nashville, TN |
| January 18, 2027; 6:30 p.m. | | Indiana State | | | | | | Curb Event Center; Nashville, TN |
| January 21, 2027; TBA | | at Valparaiso | | | | | | Athletics–Recreation Center; Valparaiso, IN |
| January 24, 2027; TBA | | at UIC | | | | | | Credit Union 1 Arena; Chicago, IL |
| January 27, 2027; 6:30 p.m. | | Drake | | | | | | Curb Event Center; Nashville, TN |
| January 30, 2027; TBA | | at Southern Illinois | | | | | | Banterra Center; Carbondale, IL |
| February 6, 2027; TBA | | at Murray State | | | | | | CFSB Center; Murray, KY |
| February 9, 2027; 6:30 p.m. | | Bradley | | | | | | Curb Event Center; Nashville, TN |
| February 12, 2027; 7:00 p.m. | | Evansville | | | | | | Curb Event Center; Nashville, TN |
| February 15, 2027; TBA | | at Indiana State | | | | | | Hulman Center; Terre Haute, IN |
| February 20, 2027; 5:00 p.m. | | Murray State | | | | | | Curb Event Center; Nashville, TN |
| February 24, 2027; 6:00 p.m. | | Valparaiso | | | | | | Curb Event Center; Nashville, TN |
| February 28, 2027; TBA | | at Northern Iowa | | | | | | McLeod Center; Cedar Falls, IA |
Conference Tournament
| * | | vs. Arch Madness Opening Round | | | | | | Enterprise Center; St. Louis, MO |
*Non-conference game. ^{#}Rankings from AP poll. (#) Tournament seedings in parentheses. All times are in Central Time Zone.
