= 2026–27 Evansville Purple Aces men's basketball team =

American college basketball season

2026–27 Evansville Purple Aces men's basketball
- Conference: Missouri Valley Conference
- Record: 3–2 (0–0 MVC)
- Head coach: David Ragland (5th season)
- Associate head coach: Craig Snow
- Assistant coaches: George Swanson; Peter Funk; D J Balentine; Sammy Dowd
- Home arena: Ford Center

2026–27 Missouri Valley Conference men's basketball standings
	Conf.				Overall
Team	W		L	PCT	W		L	PCT
Murray State	0	–	0	–	5	–	0	1.000
Belmont	0	–	0	–	3	–	1	.750
Drake	0	–	0	–	3	–	1	.750
UIC	0	–	0	–	3	–	1	.750
Valparaiso	0	–	0	–	3	–	1	.750
Southern Illinois	0	–	0	–	2	–	1	.667
Bradley	0	–	0	–	3	–	2	.600
Evansville	0	–	0	–	2	–	2	.500
Indiana State	0	–	0	–	2	–	2	.500
Northern Iowa	0	–	0	–	2	–	3	.400
Illinois State	0	–	0	–	1	–	3	.250
† 2027 MVC tournament winner As of November 18, 2026; Rankings from AP poll

The 2026–27 Evansville Purple Aces men's basketball team will represent the University of Evansville during the 2026–27 NCAA Division I men's basketball season. The Purple Aces, led by fifth-year head coach David Ragland, will play their home games at the Ford Center in Evansville, Indiana as members of the Missouri Valley Conference (MVC).

== Previous season ==
The Purple Aces finished the 2025–26 season 7–25, 3–17 in MVC play, to finish in eleventh place. They were defeated in the first round of the MVC tournament by Northern Iowa.

== Offseason ==
=== Departures ===
Evansville departures
Name	Number	Pos.	Height	Weight	Year	Hometown	Reason for departure
Marlon Barnes Jr.	5	F	6'6"	190	JR	Cleveland, OH	Transfer portal
Leif Moeller	6	G	6'7"	215	FR	Berlin, Germany	Transferred to UTEP
Kaia Berridge	9	G	6'4"		SO	Whangarei, New Zealand	Transferred to Cal State Monterey Bay
Joshua Hughes	11	F	6'10	224	JR	Brisbane, Australia	Transferred to USC
Connor Turnbull	22	F	6'10"	225	SR	Saint Paul, MN	Transferred to Utah State
Dakota Candler	32	F	6'5"	215	JR	Vincennes, IN	Transferred to Wabash
Weston Aigner	40	G	6'4"	205	JR	Newburgh, IN	Transferred to Wabash

=== Incoming transfers ===
Evansville incoming transfers
Name	Number	Pos	Height	Weight	Year	Hometown	Previous school	Years remaining	Date eligible
Makuei Riek	1	G	6'6"	190	RS Junior	Rochester, MN	SLCC	2	October 1, 2026
Luke Ellspermann	4	G	6'0"	180	Sophomore	Evansville, IN	Wabash	3	October 1, 2026
Max Langenfeld	9	G	6'6"	195	Sophomore	Ulm, Germany	FAU	3	October 1, 2026
Gustav Winther	96	F	6'10"	200	Sophomore	Roskilde, Denmark	NIU	3	October 1, 2026

=== Recruiting classes ===
==== 2026 recruiting class ====
College recruiting
Name	Hometown	School	Height	Weight	Commit date
Jeke Genschaw; Forward	Boulder, CO	Fairview High School	6 ft 6 in (1.98 m)	N/A	Jun 4, 2026
Jeke Genschaw; Forward	Recruit ratings: No ratings found				
Junior Kemm; Guard	Lausanne, Switzerland	GBA Academy	6 ft 4 in (1.93 m)	N/A	Jun 4, 2026
Junior Kemm; Guard	Recruit ratings: No ratings found				
Rafayel Masumyan; Guard	Los Angeles, CA	Granada Hills High School	6 ft 7 in (2.01 m)	N/A	Jun 4, 2026
Rafayel Masumyan; Guard	Recruit ratings: No ratings found				

==== 2027 recruiting class ====
College recruiting (2027)
Name	Hometown	School	Height	Weight	Commit date
			N/A	N/A	
Recruit ratings: No ratings found

== Roster ==
2026–27 Evansville Purple Aces men's basketball team
Players
Coaches

Pos.	#	Name	Height	Weight	Year	Previous school	Hometown
G	0	Bryce Quinet	6 ft 3 in (1.91 m)	—	So	Notre Dame Prep	Scottsdale, AZ
G	1	Makuei Riek	6 ft 6 in (1.98 m)	190 lb (86 kg)	RS Jr	Mayo/Salt Lake Community College	Rochester, MN
G	3	Rafayel Masumyan	6 ft 7 in (2.01 m)	—	Fr	Granada Hills HS	Los Angeles, CA
G	4	Luke Ellspermann	6 ft 0 in (1.83 m)	180 lb (82 kg)	So	Memorial HS/Wabash	Evansville, IN
G	5	Junior Kemm	6 ft 4 in (1.93 m)	—	Fr	GBA Academy/So Cal Academy	Lausanne, Switzerland
F	6	David Nejezchleb	6 ft 8 in (2.03 m)	—	Fr	Nymburk	Brno, Czech Republic
F/C	7	Yannick Pinas	7 ft 0 in (2.13 m)	—	RS Fr	Obradoiro CAB	Amsterdam, Netherlands
F	8	Jake Genschaw	6 ft 6 in (1.98 m)	—	Fr	Fairview HS	Boulder, CO
G	9	Max Langenfeld	6 ft 6 in (1.98 m)	195 lb (88 kg)	RS So	Urspringschule/Florida Atlantic	Ulm, Germany
F	13	James Dyson-Merwe	6 ft 11 in (2.11 m)	—	So	BA Centre of Excellence	Sydney, Australia
F	23	A J Casey	6 ft 9 in (2.06 m)	—	Sr	Whitney Young HS/Saint Louis	Chicago, IL
G	24	Caden Symons	6 ft 4 in (1.93 m)	—	Fr	Coeur d'Alene HS	Coeur d'Alene, ID
F	32	Bryce Renn	6 ft 11 in (2.11 m)	180 lb (82 kg)	Fr	Terre Haute North HS	Terre Haute, IN
G	33	Aaron Gutman	6 ft 7 in (2.01 m)	—	So	Walton-Verona HS	Walton, KY
F	96	Gustav Winther	6 ft 10 in (2.08 m)	200 lb (91 kg)	So	NIU	Roskilde, Denmark

Head coach

- David Ragland (Evansville)

Assistant coach(es)

- Craig Snow (Evansville)
- George Swanson (Northwest)
- Peter Funk (Valparaiso)
- D J Balentine (Evansville)
- Sammy Dowd (Idaho State)

Legend

- (C) Team captain
- (S) Suspended
- (I) Ineligible
- (W) Walk-on
- Injured
- Current redshirt

Roster
Last update: May 3, 2026

== Schedule and results ==
Date time, TV	Rank^{#}	Opponent^{#}	Result	Record	High points	High rebounds	High assists	Site (attendance) city, state
Exhibition Season
October 11, 2026*; 4:00 p.m.		at Austin Peay	L 74–79	–	25 – Quinet	9 – Casey	7 – Quinet	F&M Bank Arena (–); Clarksville, TN
October 21, 2026*; 5:00 p.m.		Southeast Missouri State	L 81-89	–	20 – Riek	7 – Casey	5 – Quinet	Ford Center (1,522); Evansville, IN
October 29, 2026*; 6:00 p.m.		Wabash	W 73-41	–	13 – Riek	11 – Symons	3 – Tied	Ford Center (1,826); Evansville, IN
Non-Conference Regular Season
November 2, 2026*; 7:00 p.m.		IU Kokomo	W 80-70	1–0	19 – Casey	8 – Casey	11 – Quinet	Ford Center (1850); Evansville, IN
November 7, 2026*; 7:00 p.m., ESPN+		Southern Indiana; River City Classic	W 78–76	2–0	23 – Quinet	10 – Riek	7 – Quinet	Ford Center (6,322); Evansville, IN
November 10, 2026*; TBA, 2,112		at Middle Tennessee	L 68–73	2–1	19 – Quinet	11 – Naveh	5 – Carter	Murphy Center (2,112); Murfreesboro, TN
November 14, 2026*; 1:00 p.m., ESPN+		Miami (OH)	L 78–86	2–2	30 – Quinet	7 – Gutman	8 – Quinet	Ford Center (2,652); Evansville, IN
November 17, 2026*; 7:00 p.m.		Le Moyne						Ford Center; Evansville, IN
November 22, 2026*; 1:00 p.m.		at Memphis						FedExForum; Memphis, TN
November 24, 2026*; 8:00 p.m.		at Missouri						Mizzou Arena; Columbia, MO
November 30, 2026*; 7:00 p.m.		Chicago State						Ford Center; Evansville, IN
December 5, 2026*; 1:00 p.m.		Western Kentucky						Ford Center; Evansville, IN
December 8, 2026*; 6:00 p.m.		at Ball State						Worthen Arena; Muncie, IN
December 11, 2026*; 11:00 a.m.		Brescia						Ford Center; Evansville, IN
Conference Regular Season
December 15, 2026; 7:00 p.m.		Drake						Ford Center; Evansville, IN
December 22, 2026; TBA		at Valparaiso						Athletics–Recreation Center; Valparaiso, IN
December 29, 2026; 7:00 p.m.		Illinois State						Ford Center; Evansville, IN
January 2, 2027; TBA		at Northern Iowa						McLeod Center; Cedar Falls, IA
January 5, 2027; 7:00 p.m.		Indiana State						Ford Center; Evansville, IN
January 9, 2027; TBA		at Murray State						CFSB Center; Murray, KY
January 12, 2027; 7:00 p.m.		Belmont						Ford Center; Evansville, IN
January 16, 2027; 3:00 p.m.		UIC						Ford Center; Evansville, IN
January 18, 2027; TBA		at Southern Illinois						Banterra Center; Carbondale, IL
January 21, 2027; TBA		at Bradley						Carver Arena; Peoria, IL
January 24, 2027; 3:00 p.m.		Northern Iowa						Ford Center; Evansville, IN
January 30, 2027; TBA		at Indiana State						Hulman Center; Terre Haute, IN
February 3, 2027; 7:00 p.m.		Bradley						Ford Center; Evansville, IN
February 6, 2027; TBA		at Drake						Knapp Center; Des Moines, IA
February 9, 2027; 7:00 p.m.		Murray State						Ford Center; Evansville, IN
February 12, 2027; 8:00 p.m.		at Belmont						Curb Event Center; Nashville, TN
February 15, 2027; 7:00 p.m.		Valparaiso						Ford Center; Evansville, IN
February 18, 2027; TBA		at UIC						Credit Union 1 Arena; Chicago, IL
February 21, 2027; 2:00 p.m.		at Illinois State						CEFCU Arena; Normal, IL
February 28, 2027; 3:00 p.m.		Southern Illinois						Ford Center; Evansville, IN
Conference Tournament
March 4-7, 2027*		vs. Arch Madness Opening Round						Enterprise Center; St. Louis, MO
*Non-conference game. ^{#}Rankings from AP poll. (#) Tournament seedings in parentheses. All times are in Central Time Zone.
