= 2026–27 Bradley Braves men's basketball team =

American college basketball season

2026–27 Bradley Braves men's basketball

Showdown in St. Pete winners
- Conference: Missouri Valley Conference
- Head coach: Brian Wardle (11th season)
- Assistant coaches: Mike Black; Brian Jones; Bobby Suarez; Kamrein Street
- Home arena: Carver Arena

2026–27 Missouri Valley Conference men's basketball standings
	Conf.				Overall
Team	W		L	PCT	W		L	PCT
Murray State	0	–	0	–	6	–	1	.857
Belmont	0	–	0	–	4	–	1	.800
Drake	0	–	0	–	4	–	1	.800
UIC	0	–	0	–	4	–	1	.800
Valparaiso	0	–	0	–	3	–	1	.750
Evansville	0	–	0	–	3	–	2	.600
Bradley	0	–	0	–	3	–	3	.500
Illinois State	0	–	0	–	3	–	3	.500
Northern Iowa	0	–	0	–	3	–	3	.500
Indiana State	0	–	0	–	2	–	3	.400
Southern Illinois	0	–	0	–	2	–	3	.400
† 2027 MVC tournament winner As of November 22, 2026; Rankings from AP poll

The 2026–27 Bradley Braves men's basketball team will represent Bradley University during the 2026–27 NCAA Division I men's basketball season. The Braves, led by 11th-year head coach Brian Wardle, will play their home games at the Carver Arena in Peoria, Illinois as members of the Missouri Valley Conference.

== Previous season ==
The Braves ended the 2025-26 season 21-13, 13-7 in MVC play to finish in second place. They lost to eventual champions UNI 73-69 in the semifinals of the MVC tournament. They received a bid to the National Invitation Tournament and were unseeded. They lost to the No. 2 seeded Dayton Flyers in the first round, 80-66.

== Offseason ==
=== Departures ===
Bradley departures
Name	Number	Pos.	Height	Weight	Year	Hometown	Reason for departure
Demarion Burch	0	G	6'4"	200	Junior	Milwaukee, WI	Transferred to Illinois State
Alex Huibregtse	3	G	6'4"	200	Grad Student	Grafton, WI	Graduated
Corey Thomas	4	F	6'10"	210	Senior	Buford, GA	Graduated
Matthew Zobrist	5	G	6'5"	205	Freshman	Metamora, IL	Transferred to Belmont
Montana Wheeler	7	G	5'10"	170	Freshman	Houston, TX	Transferred to Kansas State
Kai Yu	12	C	7'0"	240	RS-Sophomore	Zhuhai, China	Transferred to Valparaiso
Handy Toussaint III	13	F	6'8"	230	Junior	Port-au-Prince, Haiti	Transferred to New Mexico Highlands
Ahmet Jonovic	14	C	7'1"	250	Senior	Prijepolje, Serbia	Graduated
AJ Smith	21	F	6'7"	220	Senior	Edwardsville, IL	Graduated
JaQuan Johnson	22	G	5'11"	195	Sophomore	Milwaukee, WI	Transferred to Iowa State

=== Incoming transfers ===
Bradley incoming transfers
Name	Number	Pos	Height	Weight	Year	Hometown	Previous school	Years remaining	Date eligible
Noah Williams	0	Guard/Forward	6'8"	215	Rs-Sophomore	Los Angeles, California	Barton Community College	3	October 1, 2026
Kyle Grill	2	Guard	6'6"	215	Senior	Maize, Kansas	Fort Hays State	2	October 1, 2026
Xander Alarie	3	Forward	6'8"	195	Rs-Sophomore	Bethesda, Maryland	Northeastern	3	October 1, 2026
Ben Thornbrue	4	Forward	6'8"	230	Rs-Junior	Hillsboro, Oregon	Southern Idaho	2	October 1, 2026
Josh Ibukunoluwa	19	Forward	6'10"	232	Junior	Perth, Australia	High Point	3	October 1, 2026
Trevon Payton	20	Guard	6'6"	215	Rs-Senior	Lilburn, Georgia	Arkansas–Pine Bluff	1	October 1, 2026

=== Recruiting classes ===
==== 2026 recruiting class ====
College recruiting
Name	Hometown	School	Height	Weight	Commit date
Race Kowalczyk; SF	Toledo, Ohio	St. John's Jesuit High School and Academy	6 ft 6 in (1.98 m)	180 lb (82 kg)	May 19, 2025
Race Kowalczyk; SF	Recruit ratings: No ratings found				
Georgi Gerganov; PG	Yambol, Bulgaria	Botev 2012 Vratsa	6 ft 4 in (1.93 m)	190 lb (86 kg)	Apr 11, 2026
Georgi Gerganov; PG	Recruit ratings: No ratings found				
Dimitrije Pavlovic; PG	Beograd, Serbia	ISA Hoosac School	6 ft 4 in (1.93 m)	190 lb (86 kg)	May 9, 2026
Dimitrije Pavlovic; PG	Recruit ratings: No ratings found				
Max Gaspà; PG	Barcelona, Spain	FEDAC Manresa	6 ft 4 in (1.93 m)	200 lb (91 kg)	Jul 13, 2026
Max Gaspà; PG	Recruit ratings: No ratings found				

==== 2027 recruiting class ====
College recruiting (2027)
Name	Hometown	School	Height	Weight	Commit date
			N/A	N/A	
Recruit ratings: No ratings found

== Roster ==
2026–27 Bradley Braves men's basketball team
Players
Coaches

Pos.	#	Name	Height	Weight	Year	Previous school	Hometown
G/F	0	Noah Williams	6 ft 8 in (2.03 m)	215 lb (98 kg)	RS So	Sierra Canyon HS/Barton CC	Los Angeles, CA
G/F	1	Dietrich Richardson	6 ft 7 in (2.01 m)	185 lb (84 kg)	So	Peoria Manual HS	Peoria, IL
G	2	Kyle Grill	6 ft 6 in (1.98 m)	215 lb (98 kg)	Sr	Maize HS/Fort Hays State	Maize, KS
G	3	Xander Alarie	6 ft 8 in (2.03 m)	235 lb (107 kg)	RS So	St. Andrews Episcopal School/Northeastern	Bethesda, MD
F	4	Ben Thornbrue	6 ft 8 in (2.03 m)	230 lb (104 kg)	RS Jr	Glencoe HS/Southern Idaho	Hillsboro, OR
G	5	Jackson Seastrunk	6 ft 5 in (1.96 m)	200 lb (91 kg)	RS Fr	Xavier Academy	Fannett, TX
G	6	Max Gaspà	6 ft 4 in (1.93 m)	200 lb (91 kg)	Fr	FEDAC Manresa	Barcelona, Spain
G	8	Dimitrije Pavlovic	6 ft 4 in (1.93 m)	190 lb (86 kg)	Fr	ISA Hoosac School	Beograd, Serbia
G	10	Timoty van der Knaap	6 ft 8 in (2.03 m)	210 lb (95 kg)	Jr	Orange1 Bassano	Bassano del Grappa, Italy
C	17	Gustavo Guimarães	6 ft 11 in (2.11 m)	225 lb (102 kg)	RS Fr	Riviera Prep	São Paulo, Brazil
F	19	Josh Ibukunoluwa	6 ft 10 in (2.08 m)	230 lb (104 kg)	Jr	Willetton Senior HS/High Point	Perth, Australia
G	20	Trevon Payton	6 ft 6 in (1.98 m)	215 lb (98 kg)	RS Sr	Shiloh HS/Arkansas–Pine Bluff	Lilburn, GA
G	23	Gus Rugaard	6 ft 2 in (1.88 m)	180 lb (82 kg)	Jr	Morton HS	Morton, IL
G/F	24	Race Kowalczyk	6 ft 6 in (1.98 m)	190 lb (86 kg)	Fr	St. John's Jesuit HS	Toledo, OH
G	77	Georgi Gerganov	6 ft 4 in (1.93 m)	190 lb (86 kg)	Fr	Botev 2012 Vratsa	Yambol, Bulgaria

Head coach

- Brian Wardle (Marquette)

Assistant coach(es)

- Mike Black (Albany)
- Brian Jones (Northern Iowa)
- Bobby Suarez (Florida Gulf Coast)
- Kamrein Street (Lincoln Christian)

Legend

- (C) Team captain
- (S) Suspended
- (I) Ineligible
- (W) Walk-on
- Injured
- Current redshirt

Roster
Last update: August 13, 2026

== Schedule and results ==
Date time, TV	Rank^{#}	Opponent^{#}	Result	Record	High points	High rebounds	High assists	Site (attendance) city, state
Exhibition Season
October 23, 2026*; 7:00 p.m.		at Saint Louis	L 75-88		17 – Richardson	7 – Alarie	5 – Richardson	Chaifetz Arena; St. Louis, MO
October 28, 2026*; 7:00 p.m.		SIUE	L 48-53		11 – Thornbrue	12 – Ibukunoluwa	4 – Gaspà	Carver Arena (4,522); Peoria, IL
Non-Conference Regular Season
November 2, 2026*; 7:00 p.m., ESPN+		Monmouth College	W 85–41	1–0	17 – Thornbrue	8 – Richardson	6 – Gaspa	Carver Arena (5,130); Peoria, IL
November 7, 2026*; 7:00 p.m., ESPN+		Pacific	L 52–63	1–1	16 – Payton	8 – Tied	3 – Gaspa	Carver Arena (4,721); Peoria, IL
November 10, 2026*; 6:00 p.m., ESPN+		at Davidson	L 45–62	1–2	11 – Payton	9 – Ibukunoluwa	Tied – nbsp;	John M. Belk Arena (2,036); Davidson, NC
November 12, 2026*; 5:00 p.m., YouTube		vs. Coppin State; Showdown in St. Pete	W 56–54	2–2	16 – Payton	6 – van der Knaap	2 – Tied	McArthur Center (278); St. Petersburg, FL
November 14, 2026*; 12:00 p.m., YouTube		vs. George Mason; Showdown in St. Pete	W 62–61	3–2	17 – Alarie	5 – Tied	2 – Tied	McArthur Center; St. Petersburg, FL
November 18, 2026*; 7:00 p.m., ESPN+		Purdue Fort Wayne	L 73–78	3–3	16 – Tied	13 – van der Knaap	7 – Seastrunk	Carver Arena (4,770); Peoria, IL
November 21, 2026*; TBA, ESPN+		at Pacific						Alex G. Spanos Center; Stockton, CA
November 28, 2026*; 1:00 p.m., ESPN+		Chicago State						Carver Arena; Peoria, IL
December 1, 2026*; 7:00 p.m., ESPN+		Loras						Carver Arena; Peoria, IL
December 4, 2026*; 7:00 p.m.		at North Texas						UNT Coliseum; Denton, TX
December 8, 2026*; 7:00 p.m., ESPN+		Green Bay						Carver Arena; Peoria, IL
Conference Regular Season
December 18, 2026; 7:00 p.m., ESPN+		Belmont						Carver Arena; Peoria, IL
December 21, 2026; 6:00 p.m., ESPN+		Northern Iowa						Carver Arena; Peoria, IL
December 29, 2026; 8:00 p.m., ESPN+		Valparaiso						Carver Arena; Peoria, IL
January 4, 2027; 6:30 p.m., CBSSN		Murray State						Carver Arena; Peoria, IL
January 9, 2027; TBA, ESPN+		at Southern Iliinois						Banterra Center; Carbondale, IL
January 12, 2027; TBA		at Indiana State						Hulman Center; Terre Haute, IN
January 16, 2027; TBA, ESPN+		Drake						Carver Arena; Peoria, IL
January 19, 2027; 6:00 p.m.		at UIC						Credit Union 1 Arena; Chicago, IL
January 21, 2027; TBA, ESPN+		Evansville						Carver Arena; Peoria, IL
January 24, 2027; TBA, ESPN+		Illinois State						Carver Arena; Peoria, IL
January 27, 2027; TBA		at Murray State						CFSB Center; Murray, KY
February 3, 2027; TBA		at Evansville						Ford Center; Evansville, IN
February 6, 2027; TBA, ESPN+		UIC						Carver Arena; Peoria, IL
February 9, 2027; TBA		at Belmont						Curb Event Center; Nashville, TN
February 12, 2027; TBA		at Drake						Knapp Center; Des Moines, IA
February 15, 2027; TBA, ESPN+		Northern Iowa						Carver Arena; Peoria, IL
February 18, 2027; TBA		at Valparaiso						Athletics–Recreation Center; Valparaiso, IN
February 21, 2027; TBA, ESPN+		Southern Illinois						Carver Arena; Peoria, IL
February 24, 2027; TBA, ESPN+		Indiana State						Carver Arena; Peoria, IL
February 28, 2027; TBA		at Illinois State						CEFCU Arena; Normal, IL
Conference Tournament
*		vs. Arch Madness Opening Round						Enterprise Center; St. Louis, MO
*Non-conference game. ^{#}Rankings from AP poll. (#) Tournament seedings in parentheses. All times are in Central Time Zone.
