= 2026–27 Valparaiso Beacons men's basketball team =

American college basketball season

2026–27 Valparaiso Beacons men's basketball
- Conference: Missouri Valley Conference
- Record: 4–1 (0–0 MVC)
- Head coach: Roger Powell Jr. (4th season)
- Assistant coaches: Sean Taylor; Matt Gordon; Jesse McClung
- Home arena: Athletics–Recreation Center

2026–27 Missouri Valley Conference men's basketball standings
	Conf.				Overall
Team	W		L	PCT	W		L	PCT
Murray State	0	–	0	–	6	–	1	.857
Belmont	0	–	0	–	4	–	1	.800
Drake	0	–	0	–	4	–	1	.800
UIC	0	–	0	–	4	–	1	.800
Valparaiso	0	–	0	–	3	–	1	.750
Evansville	0	–	0	–	3	–	2	.600
Bradley	0	–	0	–	3	–	3	.500
Illinois State	0	–	0	–	3	–	3	.500
Northern Iowa	0	–	0	–	3	–	3	.500
Indiana State	0	–	0	–	2	–	3	.400
Southern Illinois	0	–	0	–	2	–	3	.400
† 2027 MVC tournament winner As of November 22, 2026; Rankings from AP poll

The 2026–27 Valparaiso Beacons men's basketball team represents Valparaiso University during the 2026–27 NCAA Division I men's basketball season. The Beacons, led by fourth-year head coach Roger Powell Jr., play their home games at the Athletics–Recreation Center in Valparaiso, Indiana as members of the Missouri Valley Conference (MVC).

== Previous season ==
The Beacons finished the 2025–26 season 18–15, 11–9 in MVC play, to finish in 7th place. In the MVC Tournament, they beat Indiana State. They soon lost to Bradley.

== Roster ==
2026–27 Valparaiso Beacons men's basketball team
Players
Coaches

Pos.	#	Name	Height	Weight	Year	Previous school	Hometown
G	0	Rajan Roberts	6 ft 3 in (1.91 m)	200 lb (91 kg)	Fr	AZ Compass Prep (Chandler, AZ)	Chicago, IL
G	1	Justus McNair	6 ft 3 in (1.91 m)	195 lb (88 kg)	Jr	Joliet West HS	Joliet, IL
G	2	Rakim Chaney	6 ft 3 in (1.91 m)	185 lb (84 kg)	So	Auburn HS	Rockford, IL
G	3	Dylan Moles	6 ft 3 in (1.91 m)	195 lb (88 kg)	Sr	Marian	Greenfield, IN
G	4	Bruno Alocen	6 ft 6 in (1.98 m)	195 lb (88 kg)	Jr	Indiana State	Barcelona, Spain
G	5	Camden Webster	6 ft 3 in (1.91 m)	200 lb (91 kg)	So	Kankakee Valley HS	Wheatfield, IN
F	7	JT Pettigrew	6 ft 8 in (2.03 m)	230 lb (104 kg)	So	Bolingbrook HS	Lisle, IL
G	10	Justin Curry II	6 ft 4 in (1.93 m)	170 lb (77 kg)	Fr	Noblesville HS	Noblesville, IN
F	11	George Richardson	6 ft 6 in (1.98 m)	225 lb (102 kg)	Fr	Evanston (Link Year Prep)	Chicago, IL
C	12	Kai Yu	7 ft 0 in (2.13 m)	250 lb (113 kg)	RS Jr	Bradley	Zhuhai, China
F	13	Carter Hopoi	6 ft 11 in (2.11 m)	235 lb (107 kg)	So	Mount Maunganui College	Tauranga, New Zealand
F	14	Hudson Scroggins	6 ft 8 in (2.03 m)	215 lb (98 kg)	Fr	Lake Forest HS	Lake Bluff, IL
C	15	Kobe Walker	6 ft 9 in (2.06 m)	265 lb (120 kg)	RS Fr	Normal Community HS	Normal, IL
G	23	Terron Garret	6 ft 6 in (1.98 m)	190 lb (86 kg)	So	Mineral Area College	St. Louis, MO
G	32	Nick Lombardi	6 ft 0 in (1.83 m)	175 lb (79 kg)	Jr	Montini Catholic HS	Lisle, IL
G	44	Sader Servilus	6 ft 4 in (1.93 m)	230 lb (104 kg)	So	Fort Erie International Academy	Montreal, Quebec, Canada

Head coach

- Roger Powell Jr. (Illinois)

Assistant coach(es)

- Sean Taylor (Marquette)
- Matt Gordon (Illinois State)
- Jesse McClung (Ball State)

Legend

- (C) Team captain
- (S) Suspended
- (I) Ineligible
- (W) Walk-on
- (5Y) Fifth-year senior
- Injured
- Current redshirt

Roster
Last update: August 26, 2026

== Schedule and results ==
Date time, TV	Rank^{#}	Opponent^{#}	Result	Record	Site (attendance) city, state
Exhibition Season
August 3, 2026*; 2:00 p.m., FloSports		vs. Carleton; Baha Mar Hoops Summer League	W 66–54	–	Arts and Entertainment Center; Nassau, Bahamas
August 4, 2026*; 6:30 p.m., FloSports		vs. Dalhousie; Baha Mar Hoops Summer League	W 90–70	–	Arts and Entertainment Center; Nassau, Bahamas
October 27, 2026*; 7:00 p.m.		Olivet Nazarene	W 85–48	–	Athletics–Recreation Center; Valparaiso, IN
Regular Season
November 2, 2026*; 7:00 p.m., ESPN+		Western Illinois	W 80–58	1–0	Athletics–Recreation Center (1,393); Valparaiso, IN
November 6, 2026*; 5:30 p.m., BTN		at Purdue	W 83–80 ^{2OT}	2–0	Mackey Arena (14,876); West Lafayette, IN
November 11, 2026*; 7:00 p.m., Midco Sports+		at South Dakota State	L 69–81	2–1	First Bank & Trust Arena; Brookings, SD
November 16, 2026*; 7:00 p.m., ESPN+		Calumet–St. Joseph	W 106–35	3–1	Athletics–Recreation Center; Valparaiso, IN
November 21, 2026*; 7:00 p.m., YouTube		vs. Troy; Pensacola Invitational	W 77–72	4–1	Pensacola Bay Center; Pensacola, FL
November 22, 2026*; 5:00 p.m., YouTube		vs. Southern Miss; Pensacola Invitational			Pensacola Bay Center; Pensacola, FL
November 28, 2026*; 2:00 p.m., ESPN+		Toledo			Athletics–Recreation Center; Valparaiso, IN
December 2, 2026; 6:00 p.m., ESPN+		at UIC			Credit Union 1 Arena; Chicago, IL
December 5, 2026*; 7:00 p.m., FloSports		at UNC Wilmington			Trask Coliseum; Wilmington, NC
December 8, 2026*; 7:00 p.m., ESPN+		Saint Xavier			Athletics–Recreation Center; Valparaiso, IN
December 12, 2026*; 2:00 p.m., ESPN+		Chicago State			Athletics–Recreation Center; Valparaiso, IN
December 18, 2026*; 6:00 p.m., ESPN+		SIU Edwardsville			Athletics–Recreation Center; Valparaiso, IN
December 22, 2026; 8:00 p.m., Gray Media		Evansville			Athletics–Recreation Center; Valparaiso, IN
December 29, 2026; 8:00 p.m., Gray Media		at Bradley			Carver Arena; Peoria, IL
January 2, 2027; 2:00 p.m., ESPN+		Southern Illinois			Athletics–Recreation Center; Valparaiso, IN
January 5, 2027; 6:00 p.m., Gray Media		at Northern Iowa			McLeod Center; Cedar Falls, IA
January 8, 2027		UIC			Athletics–Recreation Center; Valparaiso, IN
January 12, 2027		at Drake			The Knapp Center; Des Moines, IA
January 16, 2027; 4:00 p.m., ESPN+		at Illinois State			CEFCU Arena; Normal, IL
January 18, 2027; 7:00 p.m., ESPN+		Northern Iowa			Athletics–Recreation Center; Valparaiso, IN
January 21, 2027		Belmont			Athletics–Recreation Center; Valparaiso, IN
January 24, 2027		at Southern Illinois			Banterra Center; Carbondale, IL
January 27, 2027; 7:00 p.m., ESPN+		Indiana State			Athletics–Recreation Center; Valparaiso, IN
January 30, 2027		at Murray State			CFSB Center; Murray, KY
February 3, 2027		Drake			Athletics–Recreation Center; Valparaiso, IN
February 9, 2027		Illinois State			Athletics–Recreation Center; Valparaiso, IN
February 13, 2027; 12:00 p.m., Gray Media		at Indiana State			Hulman Center; Terre Haute, IN
February 15, 2027		at Evansville			Ford Center; Evansville, IN
February 18, 2027; 7:00 p.m., ESPN+		Bradley			Athletics–Recreation Center; Valparaiso, IN
February 24, 2027; 6:00 p.m., Gray Media		at Belmont			Curb Event Center; Nashville, TN
February 27, 2027; 5:00 p.m., ESPN+		Murray State			Athletics–Recreation Center; Valparaiso, IN
Conference Tournament
March 4-7, 2027*		vs. Arch Madness Opening Round			Enterprise Center; St. Louis, MO
*Non-conference game. ^{#}Rankings from AP poll. (#) Tournament seedings in parentheses. All times are in Central Time Zone.

== See also ==
- 2026–27 Valparaiso Beacons women's basketball team
