= 2026–27 Southern Illinois Salukis men's basketball team =

American college basketball season

2026–27 Southern Illinois Salukis men's basketball
- Conference: Missouri Valley Conference
- Record: 2–2 (0–0 MVC)
- Head coach: Scott Nagy (3rd season)
- Associate head coach: Steve Hawkins
- Assistant coaches: Will Veasley; Darreon Reddick; Loudon Love; Adam Blaylock
- Home arena: Banterra Center

2026–27 Missouri Valley Conference men's basketball standings
	Conf.				Overall
Team	W		L	PCT	W		L	PCT
Murray State	0	–	0	–	5	–	1	.833
Belmont	0	–	0	–	4	–	1	.800
Drake	0	–	0	–	4	–	1	.800
UIC	0	–	0	–	4	–	1	.800
Valparaiso	0	–	0	–	3	–	1	.750
Evansville	0	–	0	–	3	–	2	.600
Bradley	0	–	0	–	3	–	3	.500
Illinois State	0	–	0	–	3	–	3	.500
Northern Iowa	0	–	0	–	3	–	3	.500
Indiana State	0	–	0	–	2	–	2	.500
Southern Illinois	0	–	0	–	2	–	2	.500
† 2027 MVC tournament winner As of November 21, 2026; Rankings from AP poll

The 2026–27 Southern Illinois Salukis men's basketball team represents Southern Illinois University Carbondale during the 2026–27 NCAA Division I men's basketball season. The Salukis are led by third-year head coach Scott Nagy, and play their home games at the Banterra Center in Carbondale, Illinois as members of the Missouri Valley Conference (MVC).

== Previous season ==
The Salukis finished the 2025–26 season 16–16, 10–10 in MVC play to finish in eighth place. As the No. 8 seed in the MVC tournament, they lost to Drake in the first round.

== Roster ==
2026–27 Southern Illinois Salukis men's basketball team
Players
Coaches

Pos.	#	Name	Height	Weight	Year	Previous school	Hometown
G	0	Jeremiah Jackson	6 ft 4 in (1.93 m)	220 lb (100 kg)	Fr	St. Xavier HS	Louisville, KY
G	1	Jalen Haynes	6 ft 4 in (1.93 m)	190 lb (86 kg)	So	Sunrise Christian Academy	Lewisville, TX
F	4	Daniel Pauliukonis	6 ft 9 in (2.06 m)	215 lb (98 kg)	So	Benet Academy	Chicago, IL
F	5	Pietro Ranieri	6 ft 10 in (2.08 m)	220 lb (100 kg)	Fr	Golden State Prep	Fidenza, Italy
G	14	Luke Walsh	6 ft 3 in (1.91 m)	195 lb (88 kg)	So	St. John Vianney High School	St. Louis, MO
G	21	Caden Hawkins	6 ft 0 in (1.83 m)	185 lb (84 kg)	Sr	John A. Logan	Carterville, IL
G/F	23	Jaxon Fugate	6 ft 6 in (1.98 m)	200 lb (91 kg)	Jr	Indiana Tech	Fort Wayne, IN
G	24	Luke Susko	6 ft 6 in (1.98 m)	205 lb (93 kg)	Fr	Marcus HS	Flower Mound, TX
F	30	Donovan Hill	6 ft 8 in (2.03 m)	225 lb (102 kg)	GS	Saint Leo	Harrisburg, PA
C	33	Jaheem Webber	6 ft 10 in (2.08 m)	255 lb (116 kg)	RS Jr	Normal Community High School	Normal, IL
F	35	Max Pikaar	7 ft 0 in (2.13 m)	220 lb (100 kg)	Jr	Saint Louis	Leiden, Netherlands
F/C	50	Ty Laur	6 ft 8 in (2.03 m)	230 lb (104 kg)	Fr	Pinckney Community HS	Pinckneyville, IL
G/F	88	Brock McClure	6 ft 6 in (1.98 m)	205 lb (93 kg)	Jr	Snow College	Lumberton, TX

Head coach

- Scott Nagy (Delta State)

Assistant coach(es)

- Steve Hawkins (USSA)
- Will Veasley (Butler)
- Darreon Reddick (Tennessee State)
- Loudon Love (Wright State)
- Adam Blaylock (Peru State)

Legend

- (C) Team captain
- (S) Suspended
- (I) Ineligible
- (W) Walk-on
- Injured
- Current redshirt

Roster
Last update: October 19, 2026

== Schedule and results ==
Date time, TV	Rank^{#}	Opponent^{#}	Result	Record	Site (attendance) city, state
Exhibition Season
October 20, 2026*; 6:00 PM		Lindenwood	W 75–71		Banterra Center; Carbondale, IL
October 25, 2026*; 3:00 PM		Tenessee Tech	L 75–82		Banterra Center; Carbondale, IL
Regular Season
November 2, 2026*; 7:00 PM		Maryville	W 82–40	1–0	Banterra Center (3,224); Carbondale, IL
November 6, 2026*; 7:30 p.m.		at Kansas City	L 93–100	1–1	Municipal Auditorium (1,694); Kansas City, MO
November 12, 2026*; 7:00 PM		Richmond	W 80–70	2–1	Banterra Center (3,335); Carbondale, IL
November 17, 2026*; 5:00 PM, ESPN+		vs. Liberty	L 78–87	2–2	Curry Arena; Charlotte, NC
November 20, 2026*; 5:30 PM		vs. UT Martin; Paradise Jam			Elridge Blake Sports and Fitness Center; Charlotte Amalie West, U.S. Virgin Islands
November 28, 2026*; 6:00 PM		Portland State			Banterra Center; Carbondale, IL
December 3, 2026*; 7:00 PM		Washington State			Banterra Center; Carbondale, IL
December 9, 2026*; 7:00 PM		Southeast Missouri State			Banterra Center; Carbondale, IL
December 12, 2026*; 7:00 PM		at Little Rock			Jack Stephens Center; Little Rock, AR
December 18, 2026*; 7:00 PM		Northern Iowa			Banterra Center; Carbondale, IL
December 22, 2026; 6:00 PM		at Drake			The Knapp Center; Des Moines, IA
December 29, 2026*; 8:00 PM		at Arizona State			Desert Financial Arena; Tempe, AZ
January 2, 2027; 2:00 p.m.		at Valparaiso			Athletics–Recreation Center; Valparaiso, IN
January 5, 2027; 6:00 p.m.		at UIC			Credit Union 1 Arena (778); Chicago, IL
January 9, 2027; 6:00 p.m.		Bradley			Banterra Center; Carbondale, IL
January 12, 2027; TBA		Murray State			Banterra Center; Carbondale, IL
January 16, 2027; 4:00 PM		at Belmont			Curb Event Center; Nashville, TN
January 18, 2027; 7:00 PM		Evansville			Banterra Center; Carbondale, IL
January 21, 2027; TBA		at Indiana State			Hulman Center; Terre Haute, IN
January 24, 2027; TBA		Valparaiso			Banterra Center; Carbondale, IL
January 27, 2027; 6:00 PM		at Illinois State			CEFCU Arena; Normal, IL
January 30, 2027; TBA		Belmont			Banterra Center; Carbondale, IL
February 3, 2027; TBA		Indiana State			Banterra Center; Carbondale, IL
February 6, 2027; TBA		at Northern Iowa			McLeod Center; Cedar Falls, IA
February 9, 2027; TBA		Drake			Banterra Center; Carbondale, IL
February 15, 2027; TBA		at Murray State			CFSB Center; Murray, KY
February 18, 2027; TBA		Illinois State			Banterra Center; Carbondale, IL
February 21, 2026; TBA		at Bradley			Carver Arena; Peoria, IL
February 24, 2027; 8:00 p.m.		UIC			Banterra Center; Carbondale, IL
February 28, 2027; 3:00 p.m.		at Evansville			Ford Center; Evansville, IN
Conference Tournament
March 3-7, 2027*; TBA		vs. Arch Madness			Enterprise Center; St. Louis, MO
*Non-conference game. ^{#}Rankings from AP poll. (#) Tournament seedings in parentheses. All times are in Central Time Zone.
