= Double-headed =

Double-headed may refer to:

- Double-headed arrow, a symbol such as ↔ or ⇔
- Double-headed bug or lovebug, Plecia nearctica
- Double-headed eagle, a common symbol in heraldry and vexillology
- Double-headed flower, an abnormal growth of a flower head
- Double-headed guitar, a guitar with two necks
- Double-headed hawk moth, Coequosa triangularis
- Double-headed parrotfish or green humphead parrotfish, Bolbometopon muricatum
- Double-headed (playing) card, a playing card whose face is rotation-symmetric
- Double-headed rail, a type of railway rail whose head and foot have the same profile
- Double-heading, the use of two independently operated locomotives at the front of a train
- Dual-head, the use of two display devices with a computer
- Polycephaly, the state of having two or more heads

== See also ==
- Doubleheader (disambiguation)
