= 2026–27 Indiana State Sycamores men's basketball team =

American college basketball season

2026–27 Indiana State Sycamores men's basketball
- Conference: Missouri Valley Conference
- Record: 2-2 ( MVC)
- Head coach: Matthew Graves (3rd season)
- Associate head coach: Mark Slessinger
- Assistant coaches: Byron Jones; Isaiah Tisdale; Jake Odum; Bradley Feig
- Home arena: Hulman Center

2026–27 Missouri Valley Conference men's basketball standings
| | Conf. | | | | Overall |
| Team | W | | L | PCT | W | | L | PCT |
|---|---|---|---|---|---|---|---|---|
| Murray State | 0 | – | 0 | – | 4 | – | 0 | 1.000 |
| Belmont | 0 | – | 0 | – | 3 | – | 1 | .750 |
| Drake | 0 | – | 0 | – | 3 | – | 1 | .750 |
| UIC | 0 | – | 0 | – | 3 | – | 1 | .750 |
| Valparaiso | 0 | – | 0 | – | 3 | – | 1 | .750 |
| Southern Illinois | 0 | – | 0 | – | 2 | – | 1 | .667 |
| Bradley | 0 | – | 0 | – | 3 | – | 2 | .600 |
| Evansville | 0 | – | 0 | – | 2 | – | 2 | .500 |
| Indiana State | 0 | – | 0 | – | 2 | – | 2 | .500 |
| Northern Iowa | 0 | – | 0 | – | 2 | – | 3 | .400 |
| Illinois State | 0 | – | 0 | – | 1 | – | 3 | .250 |
† 2027 MVC tournament winner As of November 17, 2026; Rankings from AP poll

The 2026–27 Indiana State Sycamores men's basketball team is representing Indiana State University during the 2026–27 NCAA Division I men's basketball season. The Sycamores, are led by their third-year head coach Matthew Graves, will play home games at the Hulman Center in Terre Haute, Indiana as members of the Missouri Valley Conference (MVC).

== Previous season ==
The Sycamores finished the 2025–26 season 11–21, 4–16 in MVC play to finish in 10th place. They lost in the opening round of the MVC tournament to Valparaiso.

== Offseason ==
=== Departures ===
Indiana State departures
| Name | Number | Pos. | Height | Weight | Year | Hometown | Reason for departure |
|---|---|---|---|---|---|---|---|
| Sterling Young | 0 | G | 6'1" | 175 | Senior | Queens, NY | Graduated |
| Jayan Walker | 2 | G | 6'6" | 200 | Sophomore | Raleigh, NC | Transferred to Alcorn State |
| Bruno Alocen | 4 | G | 6'6" | 180 | Sophomore | Barcelona, Spain | Transferred to Valparaiso |
| Zyair Greene | 5 | G | 6'3" | 200 | GS | Atlanta, GA | Transferred to Saint Leo |
| Jo Van Buggenhout | 6 | G | 6'2" | 195 | Junior | Antwerp, Belgium | Transferred to Sacred Heart |
| Hunter Harding | 7 | C | 7'1" | 255 | Sophomore | Toronto, Ontario | Transferred to Elon |
| Camp Wagner | 8 | G | 6'6" | 190 | Junior | Dallas, TX | Transferred to UC San Diego |
| Sivert Wærstad Nordheim | 9 | G | 6'6" | 190 | Freshman | Oslo, Norway | Transferred to Barry |
| Enel St. Bernard | 10 | F | 6'6" | 215 | Junior | Harford Village, Grenada | Transferred to Sam Houston |
| Caden Huttenlocker | 12 | G | 6'2" | 185 | RS-Junior | Ellettsville, IN | Transferred to Webber International |
| Cooper Bean | 13 | G | 6'3" | 190 | Sophomore | Noblesville, IN | Transferred to Truman |
| Ian Scott | 23 | F | 6'7" | 220 | Senior | Plainfield, IN | Graduated, plays for KB Trepça |
| Derek Vorst | 35 | C | 6'10" | 250 | Junior | Luckey, OH | Transferred to Cleveland State |

=== Incoming transfers ===
On April 9, 2026, EJ McQuillan became the first commit of the 2026–27 season. The 6'4" senior guard transferred from LSUA, where he averaged 20.4 points, 4.3 rebounds, and 2.4 assists per game last season.

On April 20, 2026, Jackson Cooper, a 6'7" forward announced his commitment to the Sycamores. The Portland, Oregon native led Oregon Tech of the NAIA in scoring with 17.7 points and 5.8 assists.

Indiana State incoming transfers
| Name | Number | Pos | Height | Weight | Year | Hometown | Previous school | Years remaining | Date eligible |
|---|---|---|---|---|---|---|---|---|---|
| Jackson Cooper | 35 | F | 6'7" | 225 | Senior | Portland, OR | Oregon Tech | 1 | October 1, 2026 |
| Karmani Gregory | 7 | G | 6'1" | 175 | Senior | Palmetto, FL | South Carolina Upstate | 1 | October 1, 2026 |
| EJ McQuillan | 1 | G | 6'4" | 190 | Senior | Port Allen, LA | LSUA | 1 | October 1, 2026 |
| Maguire Mitchell | 13 | G | 6'5" | 185 | Sophomore | Zionsville, IN | IU Indy | 3 | October 1, 2026 |
| Duce Paschal | 9 | G | 6'5" | 185 | Sophomore | Portland, OR | Weber State | 3 | October 1, 2026 |
| Greyson Pritzl | 12 | G | 6'4" | 205 | Senior | West Allis, WI | Lander | 1 | October 1, 2026 |
| Chance Puryear | 5 | F | 6'7" | 210 | Sophomore | Dallas, TX | SMU | 3 | October 1, 2026 |
| Aleksa Vlajic | 15 | F | 6'10" | 225 | Sophomore | Belgrade, Serbia | Buffalo | 3 | October 1, 2026 |
| Meechie White | 2 | G | 6'1" | 175 | Senior | Louisville, KY | Eastern Illinois | 1 | October 1, 2026 |

=== Recruiting classes ===
==== 2026 recruiting class ====
College recruiting
| Name | Hometown | School | Height | Weight | Commit date |
|---|---|---|---|---|---|
| Alessio Calamita; Forward | | FC Bayern Munich | 6 ft 10 in (2.08 m) | 255 lb (116 kg) | Apr 24, 2026 |
| Alessio Calamita; Forward | Recruit ratings: No ratings found | | | | |

==== 2027 recruiting class ====
College recruiting (2027)
| Name | Hometown | School | Height | Weight | Commit date |
|---|---|---|---|---|---|
| | | | N/A | N/A | |
Recruit ratings: No ratings found

== Roster ==
2026–27 Indiana State Sycamores men's basketball team
Players
Coaches

| Pos. | # | Name | Height | Weight | Year | Previous school | Hometown |
|---|---|---|---|---|---|---|---|
| G | 1 | EJ McQuillan | 6 ft 4 in (1.93 m) | 175 lb (79 kg) | Sr | Port Allen HS/LSUA | Port Allen, LA |
| G | 2 | Meechie White | 6 ft 1 in (1.85 m) | 175 lb (79 kg) | Sr | Male HS/Eastern Illinois | Louisville, KY |
| G | 3 | EJ Hazelett | 6 ft 7 in (2.01 m) | 180 lb (82 kg) | Fr | Kankakee | Indianapolis, IN |
| F | 5 | Chance Puryear | 6 ft 7 in (2.01 m) | 210 lb (95 kg) | So | Carter HS/SMU | Dallas, TX |
| G | 7 | Karmani Gregory | 6 ft 1 in (1.85 m) | 175 lb (79 kg) | Sr | Southeast HS/USC Upstate | Palmetto, FL |
| G | 9 | Duce Paschal | 6 ft 5 in (1.96 m) | 185 lb (84 kg) | So | Central Catholic HS/Weber State | Portland, OR |
| G | 12 | Greyson Pritzl | 6 ft 4 in (1.93 m) | 205 lb (93 kg) | Sr | West Allis Central HS/Lander | West Allis, WI |
| G | 13 | Maguire Mitchell | 6 ft 5 in (1.96 m) | 185 lb (84 kg) | So | Zionsville High School/IU Indy | Zionsville, IN |
| F | 15 | Aleksa Vlajic | 6 ft 10 in (2.08 m) | 225 lb (102 kg) | So | Hoosac School/Buffalo | Belgrade, Serbia |
| G | 21 | Martin Kaupanger | 6 ft 5 in (1.96 m) | 190 lb (86 kg) | So | Annie Wright | Gig Harbor, WA |
| G | 23 | Ian Thomas | 6 ft 2 in (1.88 m) | 200 lb (91 kg) | Fr | De Smet Jesuit HS | St. Louis, MO |
| F | 32 | Kade Speckman | 6 ft 9 in (2.06 m) | 210 lb (95 kg) | Fr | Lutheran HS | Denver, CO |
| F | 35 | Jackson Cooper | 6 ft 7 in (2.01 m) | 220 lb (100 kg) | Sr | Cleveland HS/Oregon Tech | Portland, OR |
| F | 45 | Alessio Calamita | 6 ft 10 in (2.08 m) | 255 lb (116 kg) | Fr | FC Bayern Munich | Italy |

Head coach

- Matthew Graves (Butler)

Assistant coach(es)

- Mark Slessinger (Aurora)
- Byron Jones (Central Oklahoma)
- Isaiah Tisdale (East Tennessee State)
- Jake Odum (Indiana State)
- Bradley Feig (LSU New Orleans)

Legend

- (C) Team captain
- (S) Suspended
- (I) Ineligible
- (W) Walk-on
- Injured
- Current redshirt

Roster
Last update: July 1, 2026

== Schedule and results ==
| Date time, TV | Rank^{#} | Opponent^{#} | Result | Record | High points | High rebounds | High assists | Site (attendance) city, state |
Exhibition Season
| October 18, 2026*; 6:30 p.m. | | at Butler | L 74–81 | – | 22 – Gregory | 8 – Puryear | 4 – Gregory | Hinkle Fieldhouse (5,783); Indianapolis, IN |
| October 24, 2026*; 6:00 p.m. | | Rose–Hulman | W 81–59 | – | 22 – Cooper | 7 – Puryear | 3 – Cooper | Hulman Center; Terre Haute, IN |
Regular Season
| November 2, 2026*; 7:00 p.m., ESPN+ | | Charlotte | L 70–78 | 0–1 | 29 – Gregory | 5 – Paschal | 8 – Gregory | Hulman Center (6,154); Terre Haute, IN |
| November 6, 2026*; 7:00 p.m., ESPN+ | | at Ball State | W 69–66 | 1–1 | 20 – Gregory | 11 – Paschal | 3 – Gregory | Worthen Arena (3,045); Muncie, IN |
| November 11, 2026*; 7:00 p.m., ESPN+ | | Milwaukee | L 73-82 | 1-2 | 19 – Mitchell | 9 – Puryear | 6 – Gregory | Hulman Center (4,217); Terre Haute, IN |
| November 14, 2026*; 7:00 p.m., N/A | | Earlham | W 109-37 | 2-2 | 19 – Paschal | 14 – Calamita | 4 – White | Hulman Center; Terre Haute, IN |
| November 20, 2026*; 3:00 p.m., ESPN+ | | vs. Stephen F. Austin; Paradise Jam Opening Round | | | | | | UVI Sports and Fitness Center; St. Thomas, USVI |
| November 21–22, 2026* | | vs. Paradise Jam | | | | | | UVI Sports and Fitness Center; St. Thomas, USVI |
| November 23, 2026* | | vs. Paradise Jam | | | | | | UVI Sports and Fitness Center; St. Thomas, USVI |
| November 28, 2026*; 1:00 p.m., ESPN+ | | IU Columbus | | | | | | Hulman Center; Terre Haute, IN |
| December 2, 2026*; 7:00 p.m., ESPN+ | | SIU Edwardsville | | | | | | Hulman Center; Terre Haute, IN |
| December 6, 2026*; 1:00 p.m., ESPN+ | | Southern Indiana | | | | | | Hulman Center; Terre Haute, IN |
| December 12, 2026*; 4:00 p.m. | | at Oregon | | | | | | Matthew Knight Arena; Eugene, OR |
| December 15, 2026 | | at UIC | | | | | | Credit Union 1 Arena; Chicago, IL |
| December 19, 2026 | | Murray State | | | | | | Hulman Center; Terre Haute, IN |
| December 22, 2026*; 6:00 p.m. | | at Kansas | | | | | | Allen Fieldhouse; Lawrence, KS |
| December 29, 2026 | | Drake | | | | | | Hulman Center; Terre Haute, IN |
| January 2, 2027 | | at Illinois State | | | | | | CEFCU Arena; Normal, IL |
| January 5, 2027 | | at Evansville | | | | | | Ford Center; Evansville, IN |
| January 9, 2027 | | Northern Iowa | | | | | | Hulman Center; Terre Haute, IN |
| January 12, 2027 | | Bradley | | | | | | Hulman Center; Terre Haute, IN |
| January 16, 2027 | | at Murray State | | | | | | CFSB Center; Murray, KY |
| January 18, 2027 | | at Belmont | | | | | | Curb Event Center; Nashville, TN |
| January 21, 2027 | | Southern Illinois | | | | | | Hulman Center; Terre Haute, IN |
| January 27, 2027 | | at Valparaiso | | | | | | Athletics–Recreation Center; Valparaiso, IN |
| January 30, 2027 | | Evansville | | | | | | Hulman Center; Terre Haute, IN |
| February 3, 2027 | | at Southern Illinois | | | | | | Banterra Center; Carbondale, IL |
| February 6, 2027 | | Illinois State | | | | | | Hulman Center; Terre Haute, IN |
| February 9, 2027 | | at Northern Iowa | | | | | | McLeod Center; Cedar Falls, IA |
| February 13, 2027 | | Valparaiso | | | | | | Hulman Center; Terre Haute, IN |
| February 15, 2027 | | Belmont | | | | | | Hulman Center; Terre Haute, IN |
| February 18, 2027 | | at Drake | | | | | | Knapp Center; Des Moines, IA |
| February 21, 2027 | | UIC | | | | | | Hulman Center; Terre Haute, IN |
| February 24, 2027 | | Bradley | | | | | | Carver Arena; Peoria, IL |
Conference Tournament
| * | | vs. Arch Madness Opening Round | | | | | | Enterprise Center; St. Louis, MO |
*Non-conference game. ^{#}Rankings from AP poll. (#) Tournament seedings in parentheses. All times are in Central Time Zone.
