= Doubleheader =

Doubleheader or double header may refer to:

- Doubleheader (baseball), two baseball games played between the same two teams on the same day
- Doubleheader (television), a broadcast of two games back-to-back
- Double heading, using two railway locomotives to pull a long or heavy train
- A fish of the Wrasse family Coris bulbifrons
- The Double Header, a gay bar in Seattle, United States
- "Double Header", a story from The Railway Series story, "The Eight Famous Engines"
- "Double Header", a 1994-1995 episode of the Ren & Stimpy Show

== See also ==
- Double-headed (disambiguation)
