= Player of the Week =

Player of the Week may refer to:

- AT&T ESPN All-America Player, in college football
- Euroleague Player of the Week
- FedEx Air & Ground NFL Players of the Week
- Major League Baseball Player of the Week Award
- NWSL Player of the Week
- NBA Player of the Month and Week
