= David Ragland =

American basketball coach (born 1981)

Current position
- Title: Head coach
- Team: Evansville
- Conference: Missouri Valley
- Record: 40–91 (.305)

Biographical details
- Born: April 28, 1981 (age 45); Evansville, Indiana, U.S.

Playing career
- 1999–2001: Missouri Southern
- 2001–2003: Southern Indiana

Coaching career (HC unless noted)
- 2004–2005: Frank Phillips (assistant)
- 2005–2008: Vincennes (assistant)
- 2008–2010: Vincennes
- 2010–2014: Indiana State (assistant)
- 2014–2015: Bowling Green (assistant)
- 2015–2016: Northern Kentucky (assistant)
- 2016–2018: Valparaiso (assistant)
- 2018–2021: Utah State (assistant)
- 2021–2022: Butler (assistant)
- 2022–present: Evansville

Head coaching record
- Overall: 40–91 (.305) (NCAA); 44–19 (.698) (NJCAA)
- Tournaments: 1–1 (CBI)

David Ragland (born April 28, 1981) is an American basketball coach who is the current head coach of the Evansville Aces men's basketball team.

== Playing career ==
Ragland attended his first two years of college at Missouri Southern State, competing on the men's basketball team before transferring home to play for Southern Indiana.

== Coaching career ==
Ragland began his coaching career in the junior college ranks, starting at Frank Phillips College in Borger, Texas as an assistant coach for one season before moving on to Vincennes, where he'd serve as an assistant for three seasons before being elevated to head coach for two seasons, going 44–19. In 2010, Ragland would move to the Division I ranks, joining Greg Lansing's staff at Indiana State. He'd then join Bowling Green and Northern Kentucky as an assistant coach for back-to-back seasons, before landing on the coaching staff at Valparaiso. He'd then head west as an assistant coach under Craig Smith at Utah State where he was on staff for three consecutive NCAA tournament appearances, two Mountain West Conference tournament titles and Mountain West regular season title. Ragland would return to the state of Indiana, joining LaVall Jordan's staff at Butler for a single season.

On May 24, 2022, Ragland was announced as the new head men's basketball coach at Evansville, replacing Todd Lickliter.

== Head coaching record ==
=== NCAA D1 ===
Record table
Season	Team	Overall	Conference	Standing	Postseason
Evansville Purple Aces (Missouri Valley Conference) (2022–present)
2022–23	Evansville	5–27	1–19	12th	
2023–24	Evansville	17–18	6–14	10th	CBI Quarterfinals
2024–25	Evansville	11–21	8–12	T–8th	
2025–26	Evansville	7–25	3–17	11th	
2026–27	Evansville	0–0	0–0		
Evansville:		40–91 (.305)	18–62 (.225)		
Total:		40–91 (.305)			
National champion Postseason invitational champion Conference regular season champion Conference regular season and conference tournament champion Division regular season champion Division regular season and conference tournament champion Conference tournament champion

=== NJCAA ===
Record table
Season	Team	Overall	Conference	Standing	Postseason
Vincennes (Mid-West Athletic Conference) (2008–2010)
2008–09	Vincennes	22–9			
2009–10	Vincennes	22–10			
Vincennes:		44–19 (.698)	0–0 (–)		
Total:		44–19 (.698)			
National champion Postseason invitational champion Conference regular season champion Conference regular season and conference tournament champion Division regular season champion Division regular season and conference tournament champion Conference tournament champion
