= Roger Powell (basketball) =

American former basketball player-coach

Valparaiso Beacons
- Title: Head coach
- League: Missouri Valley Conference

Personal information
- Born: January 15, 1983 (age 43) Joliet, Illinois, U.S.
- Listed height: 6 ft 6 in (1.98 m)
- Listed weight: 220 lb (100 kg)

Career information
- High school: Joliet West (Joliet, Illinois)
- College: Illinois (2001–2005)
- NBA draft: 2005: undrafted
- Playing career: 2005–2011
- Position: Small forward
- Number: 43
- Coaching career: 2011–present

Career history

Playing
- 2005–2006: Rockford Lightning
- 2006: Utah Jazz
- 2006–2007: Arkansas Rimrockers
- 2007–2008: Siviglia Wear Teramo
- 2008–2009: Hapoel Jerusalem
- 2009–2010: Murcia
- 2010: JDA Dijon
- 2010–2011: Skyliners Frankfurt

Coaching
- 2011–2016: Valparaiso (assistant)
- 2016–2019: Vanderbilt (associate HC)
- 2019–2023: Gonzaga (assistant)
- 2023–present: Valparaiso

Career highlights
- As player: Jason Collier Sportsmanship Award (2007); All-CBA Second Team (2006); CBA Rookie of the Year (2006); CBA All-Rookie Team (2006); As assistant coach: 2× Horizon League regular season champion (2012, 2013); Horizon League tournament champion (2013)
- Stats at NBA.com
- Stats at Basketball Reference

Roger Powell Jr. (born January 15, 1983) is an American former professional basketball player and current head coach of the Valparaiso Beacons men's basketball team. Powell was previously an assistant at Gonzaga. He played collegiately at the University of Illinois from 2001 to 2005, after having attended Joliet Central High School, with a 2001 graduation. Powell played the forward position for his high school and in college. He graduated from the University of Illinois with a degree in speech communications. Powell's father was a former Joliet Central High School and Illinois State player.

== Playing career ==
=== High school career ===
Powell was a three-year starter and a four-year letter winner for Joliet Township High School. As a junior, he led the Steelmen to a 20–8 record averaging 19 points and eight rebounds. Powell helped his squad win the SICA West Conference as a junior and senior. Also as a junior, he earned a bronze medal as a member of the 1999 USA Basketball Men's Youth Development Festival North Team. Powell also made the Pontiac Holiday Tourney all-Tournament Team and was second team all state.

As a senior, Powell averaged 20.7 points and nine rebounds for a 25-5 sectional finalist that was ranked No. 3 in the Chicago area. He earned First Team All State honors at Joliet in 2001 from the Chicago Tribune, Chicago Sun-Times, Champaign-Urbana News-Gazette, Associated Press and Illinois Basketball Coaches Association. He was considered a consensus Top 100 prospect in the nation and was fourth in voting for Mr. Basketball in Illinois. He played in the Wendy's All-Star Classic and earned MVP honors at the IBCA All-Star Game following his senior year.

=== Early college career ===
As a true freshman, Powell played in 27 games and averaged 2.9 points and 1.8 rebounds per game. In his first year, he scored a season-high 12 points against Western Illinois. He played a season-high 15 minutes against Loyola-Chicago where he scored five points and added five rebounds. His role was primarily to provide a spark off the bench which he did against Wisconsin, scoring six points on 3-of-3 shooting and grabbing four rebounds, three offensive. In the NCAA tournament, he provided four points and four rebounds in seven minutes of play in Illinois' first-round win against San Diego State.

In his sophomore season, Powell started 19 games including 10 of the last 11. He led the Big Ten in field goal percentage in conference games with a 64.1 percent mark. He was third on the team in scoring with 8.7 points per game. He scored a season-high 22 points versus Indiana on 9-of-13 shooting. He scored in double figures 13 times and scoring 15-plus points 9 times. He was slowed by a toe injury mid-season causing him to be out of the lineup for two weeks. He was named to the Big Ten All-Tournament Team leading Illinois with 16 points in the title game versus Ohio State. He participated on the Big Ten European Tour team and led the squad in scoring 14 points per game.

=== Late college career ===
In his third season with the Illini, Powell was an honorable mention All-Big Ten selection. Powell started 31 games on the season missing some time due to a concussion suffered in a Big Ten tournament quarterfinal game against Indiana. He averaged 11.6 points per game, putting him third on the team and 20th in the Big Ten. He also averaged 5 rebounds a game which was second on the team. He ranked third in the Big Ten in field goal shooting at 59.5 percent. He was also second on the team in offensive rebounding notching 75 on the season. Powell scored a career-high 24 points and grabbed nine rebounds at Wisconsin on January 24, 2004. In the 2004 NCAA tournament, he scored 22 points on 9-of-11 shooting in the second-round win over Cincinnati and followed that performance with a team-high 15-point, eight-rebound game in a Sweet 16 loss to Duke. Powell entered the NBA draft but did not sign with an agent and was not drafted allowing him to return for his senior season.

In his final season, Powell was named an honorable mention All-Big Ten selection by both league coaches and media. He was a member of the national runner-up Illini who tied an NCAA record with 37 wins. He started every game and ranked fourth on the team in scoring, averaging 12.0 points per game, and scoring in double figures in 26 of 39 games. He was second on the Illini and eleventh in the Big Ten averaging 5.7 rebounds per game. He was named Big Ten player of the week on December 6 following wins over Wake Forest (19 points) and Arkansas (19 points, 11 rebounds).

He scored his 1,000th point versus Indiana on Feb. 6 and ended his career ranked 26th on the Illini all-time scoring list with 1,178 career points. He also ranks fifth in school history in career field goal percentage at 57.2 percent (456–797).

=== Professional career ===
Powell participated in various NBA summer leagues looking to be picked up by an NBA roster. He eventually made the Seattle SuperSonics' training roster but failed to make the final roster.

Powell then decided to play in the Continental Basketball Association (CBA). The Rockford Lightning drafted Powell in the fourth round (30th overall selection) of the CBA draft in 2005. He enjoyed unparalleled success with the Lightning. The CBA named Powell the Rookie of the Year for the 2005–06 season, voted on by the eight CBA head coaches. He was nominated to the All-CBA Second Team and All-Rookie Team.

Powell continued to pursue a career in the NBA trying out for the Utah Jazz where he was reunited with former Illini teammates Dee Brown and Deron Williams. After working relentlessly over the summer, Powell made the Jazz's final roster for the 2006–07 NBA season. However, he was cut in mid-January, having scored his first points in the NBA with a pair of free throws on November 18, 2006, against the Phoenix Suns after being fouled by Shawn Marion.

He then played for the Arkansas Rimrockers of the NBDL. Powell was named the D-League's player of the month for February 2007, averaging 27.6 points and 7.3 rebounds in 11 games, scoring at least 19 in each of the 11, including 46 in a February 2 game against the Fort Worth Flyers. In April 2007, he received the NBA Development League 2006–07 Jason Collier Sportsmanship Award for Conduct and Character on court.

In 2007–08, he joined Teramo Basket of Serie A in Italy.

In October 2008, he joined the Chicago Bulls but did not make the final roster.

In 2008–09, he joined Hapoel Jerusalem of the Israeli League.

In 2009–10, he joined CB Murcia of Spain's Liga ACB, the top division of Spain's professional leagues.

In February 2010 he signed a three-month contract with JDA Dijon in France.

He spent the 2010 preseason on the Chicago Bulls' training camp roster. However, he was waived on October 21.

On October 28, 2010, he signed a contract with the German club Skyliners Frankfurt until mid-January, with an extension option until the end of the season.

== Coaching career ==
On June 28, 2011, Powell joined the coaching staff of the Valparaiso Crusaders men's basketball team, as an assistant.

On April 6, 2016, Powell followed Bryce Drew to Vanderbilt and joined the coaching staff of the Vanderbilt Commodores men's basketball team, as an associate head coach.

From the 2019–20 through the 2022–23 seasons, Powell was an assistant under Mark Few at Gonzaga in the WCC.

On April 7, 2023, Powell made his return to Valpo as the Beacons' new head coach.

== Personal life ==
Powell is a Christian. He is married to Tara Powell. They have four children.

== Head coaching record ==
Record table
Season	Team	Overall	Conference	Standing	Postseason
Valparaiso (Missouri Valley Conference) (2023–present)
2023–24	Valparaiso	7–25	3–17	12th	
2024–25	Valparaiso	15–19	6–14	11th	
2025–26	Valparaiso	18–15	11–9	7th	
2026–27	Valparaiso	2–0	0–0		
Valparaiso:		42–59 (.416)	20–30 (.400)		
Total:		42–59 (.416)			
National champion Postseason invitational champion Conference regular season champion Conference regular season and conference tournament champion Division regular season champion Division regular season and conference tournament champion Conference tournament champion

== College statistics ==
Year	G-GS	Min-Avg	FGM-A/%	3PM-A/%	FTM-A/%	OR-DR—TOT/Avg	PF-DQ	A	TO	B	S	PTS/Avg
01–02	27–0	160–5.9	27-50/.540	3-5/.600	22-36/.611	19-29—48/1.8	21–0	2	10	4	3	79/2.9
02–03	30–19	558–18.6	104-176/.591	20-49/.408	33-57/.579	40-61—101/3.4	46–0	12	24	12	9	261/8.7
03–04	32–31	856–26.8	150-252/.595	4-12/.333	67-105/.638	75-85—160/5.0	78–1	22	40	14	21	371/11.6
04–05	39-39	979–25.1	175-319/.549	20-52/.385	97-133/.729	103-119—222/5.7	102–0	16	42	9	25	467/12.0
Totals	128-89	2553-19.9	456-797/.572	47-118/.398	219-331/.662	237-294—531/4.1	247-1	52	116	39	58	1178/9.2

G-GS = Games Played and Games Started
Min-Avg = Minutes per season and average minutes per game
FGM-A/% = Field Goals Made per Attempts and Percentage
3PM-A/% = Three Point Field Goals Made per Attempts and Percentage
FTM-A/% = Free Throws Made per Attempts and Percentage
OR-DR—TOT/Avg = Offensive Rebounds, Defensive Rebounds, Total Rebounds, and Average per game
PF-DQ = Personal Fouls and Disqualifications
A = Assists
TO = Turnovers
B = Blocks
S = Steals
PTS/Avg = Total Points and Average Points per Game
