= Ryan Miller (basketball) =

American basketball player and coach

Current position
- Title: Head coach
- Team: Murray State
- Conference: MVC
- Record: 20–13 (.606)

Biographical details
- Born: September 27, 1975 (age 51); Mitchell, South Dakota, U.S.

Playing career
- 1994–1998: Northern State
- 1999–2000: Fargo-Moorhead Beez
- 2000–2001: South Dakota Gold

Coaching career (HC unless noted)
- 2000–2001: South Dakota Gold (assistant)
- 2004–2006: Memphis (assistant)
- 2006–2007: Pepperdine (assistant)
- 2007–2012: New Mexico (assistant)
- 2012–2014: Auburn (associate HC)
- 2014–2016: UNLV (assistant)
- 2016–2021: TCU (assistant HC)
- 2021–2025: Creighton (assistant)
- 2025–present: Murray State

Head coaching record
- Overall: 20–13 (.606)
- Tournaments: 0–1 (NIT)

Ryan Miller (born September 27, 1975) is an American college basketball coach and current head coach at Murray State University. He has been an assistant coach at UNLV, Auburn, New Mexico, Pepperdine, Memphis and TCU. He has coached under John Calipari, Steve Alford, Tony Barbee and Dave Rice over the course of his career.

Born in Mitchell, South Dakota, Miller attended Mitchell High School and played for coach Gary Munsen, leading the Mitchell Kernels to the South Dakota State AA championship in 1994. Miller earned All-State honors in 1993 and repeated the honor in 1994.

Miller and his family have made their mark within basketball circles in South Dakota and on a national level. Miller's father Tom and uncles Chris and Alan were all stand-out players at Dakota Wesleyan University; Alan Miller is still the all-time leading scorer in South Dakota college basketball history. Miller's brothers are Jared (former teammate at Northern State) and Mike, two-time NBA champion with the Miami Heat and currently assistant men's basketball coach at the University of Memphis. Miller's cousin, Macy Miller (Alan's daughter) is currently the point guard for the South Dakota State University women's basketball team where she has led the Jackrabbits to back-to-back Summit League tournament titles and NCAA Tournament appearances.

Collegiately, Miller played at Northern State University in Aberdeen, South Dakota leading his team as captain in 1998 to a region championship, Elite 8 appearance and a ranking as high as #3 in Division II nationally. That same year he was awarded NSIC (Conference) MVP and Region MVP. Overall, Miller was a two-time All-Conference award winner, All-Academic and All-American at Northern State as well. Following his college playing career Miller was named to the Northern State Hall of Fame in 2013.

After college, Miller played professionally as he was drafted into the CBA in 1999 and then played for the Fargo-Morehead Beez in the International Basketball League during the 1999 season. Following that Miller played in the Australian Basketball Association for two seasons winning a league championship and being named league MVP.

Miller's college coaching career began in 2003 at the University of Memphis as he was at the Tigers from 2003 to 2006, where he worked under coach John Calipari. During the 2006–07 season Miller was an assistant coach at Pepperdine University and from 2007–2012 he was an assistant basketball coach at the University of New Mexico under current Nevada coach Steve Alford. Miller served as associate head coach at Auburn University from 2012–2014 working under coach Tony Barbee. From 2014–2016, Miller was the associate head coach/assistant coach at UNLV. Miller was an assistant under head coach Greg McDermott.

On March 17, 2025, Miller was named the 18th head coach of the Murray State Racers.

== Head coaching record ==
Record table
Season	Team	Overall	Conference	Standing	Postseason
Murray State Racers (Missouri Valley Conference) (2025–present)
2025–26	Murray State	20–13	12–8	T–3rd	NIT First Round
Murray State:		20–13 (.606)	12–8 (.600)		
Total:		20–13 (.606)			
National champion Postseason invitational champion Conference regular season champion Conference regular season and conference tournament champion Division regular season champion Division regular season and conference tournament champion Conference tournament champion
